= 2024–25 Louisiana–Monroe Warhawks men's basketball team =

American college basketball season

2024–25 Louisiana–Monroe Warhawks men's basketball
- Conference: Sun Belt Conference
- Record: 7–25 (3–15 Sun Belt)
- Head coach: Keith Richard (15th season)
- Assistant coaches: Phil Cunningham; Christopher Woodall; Ronnie Dean
- Home arena: Fant–Ewing Coliseum

2024–25 Sun Belt Conference men's basketball standings
	Conf.				Overall
Team	W		L	PCT	W		L	PCT
South Alabama	13	–	5	.722	21	–	11	.656
James Madison	13	–	5	.722	20	–	12	.625
Troy †	13	–	5	.722	23	–	11	.676
Arkansas State	13	–	5	.722	25	–	11	.694
Marshall	12	–	6	.667	20	–	13	.606
Appalachian State	10	–	8	.556	17	–	14	.548
Texas State	9	–	9	.500	16	–	16	.500
Georgia State	8	–	10	.444	14	–	19	.424
Georgia Southern	8	–	10	.444	17	–	16	.515
Old Dominion	8	–	10	.444	15	–	20	.429
Louisiana	8	–	10	.444	12	–	21	.364
Southern Miss	5	–	13	.278	11	–	22	.333
Coastal Carolina	3	–	15	.167	10	–	22	.313
Louisiana–Monroe	3	–	15	.167	7	–	25	.219
† 2025 Sun Belt tournament winner

The 2024–25 Louisiana–Monroe Warhawks men's basketball team represented the University of Louisiana at Monroe during the 2024–25 NCAA Division I men's basketball season. The Warhawks, led by 15th-year head coach Keith Richard, played their home games at Fant–Ewing Coliseum in Monroe, Louisiana, as members of the Sun Belt Conference.

On December 20, 2024, Richard announced his retirement effective at the end of the season.

== Previous season ==
The Warhawks finished the 2023–24 season 11–19, 6–12 in Sun Belt play to finish in twelfth place. They were defeated by Coastal Carolina in the first round of the Sun Belt tournament.

== Offseason ==
=== Departures ===
Departures
Name	Number	Pos.	Height	Weight	Year	Hometown	Reason for departure
Savion Gallion	1	G	6'4"	192	Senior	Washington, D.C.	Graduated
Tyreke Locure	3	G	6'0"	167	Senior	New Orleans, Louisiana	Graduated
Nika Metskhvarishvili	4	F	6'8"	240	Senior	Tbilisi, Georgia	Transferred to Charlotte
Edwin Litolff	22	F	6'7"	189	Sophomore	Livingston, Louisiana	
Johnnie Williams IV	23	G	6'5"	180	Junior	Sarasota, Florida	Entered the transfer portal

=== Incoming transfers ===
Incoming transfers
Name	Number	Pos.	Height	Weight	Year	Hometown	Previous school
Ta'Zir Smith	3	G	6'3"	182	Sophomore	Woodbridge, Virginia	Pearl River Community College
Coltie Young	24	G	6'3"	210	Senior	Starkville, Mississippi	Jackson State

=== Recruiting class ===
College recruiting information
Name	Hometown	School	Height	Weight	Commit date
Micah Caster; G	Jackson, Alabama	Jackson High School	6 ft 9 in (2.06 m)	180 lb (82 kg)	
Micah Caster; G	Recruit ratings: Rivals: 247Sports: ESPN: (N/A)				
Renars Sondors; F	Riga, Latvia	Marupe SC	6 ft 9 in (2.06 m)	189 lb (86 kg)	
Renars Sondors; F	Recruit ratings: Rivals: 247Sports: ESPN: (N/A)				
Overall recruit ranking:
Note: In many cases, Scout, Rivals, 247Sports, On3, and ESPN may conflict in their listings of height and weight.; In these cases, the average was taken. ESPN grades are on a 100-point scale.; Sources: "2024 Team Ranking". Rivals.

== Preseason ==
=== Preseason Sun Belt Conference poll ===
The Warhawks were picked to finish in last place in the conference's preseason poll.

Coaches poll
Predicted finish	Team (1st place Votes)
1	Arkansas State - 193 (12)
2	James Madison - 170 (1)
3	Troy - 155 (1)
4	Louisiana - 144
5	Southern Miss - 133
6	App State - 122
7	Texas State - 89
T8	Georgia Southern - 85
T8	Old Dominion - 85
10	Marshall - 79
11	South Alabama - 78
12	Georgia State - 75
13	Coastal Carolina - 34
14	ULM - 28

== Roster ==
2024–25 Louisiana–Monroe Warhawks men's basketball team
Players
Coaches

Pos.	#	Name	Height	Weight	Year	Previous school	Hometown
G	0	Jacob Wilson	6 ft 6 in (1.98 m)	202 lb (92 kg)	Jr	Liberty Magnet High School	Baton Rouge, Louisiana
G	1	P.D. McCraney	6 ft 1 in (1.85 m)	176 lb (80 kg)	Jr	Hinds Community College	Monroe, Louisiana
G	2	Devon Hancock	6 ft 3 in (1.91 m)	200 lb (91 kg)	Sr	Milwaukee	Dallas, Texas
G	3	Ta'Zir Smith	6 ft 3 in (1.91 m)	182 lb (83 kg)	So	Pearl River Community College	Woodbridge, Virginia
G	4	Micah Caster	6 ft 2 in (1.88 m)	180 lb (82 kg)	Fr	Jackson High School	Jackson, Alabama
G	5	Jalen Bolden	6 ft 4 in (1.93 m)	212 lb (96 kg)	Jr	Zachary High School	Zachary, Louisiana
G	10	Tyreese Watson	6 ft 4 in (1.93 m)	190 lb (86 kg)	Sr	Cochise College	Philadelphia, Pennsylvania
G	11	Kelton Williams	6 ft 1 in (1.85 m)	176 lb (80 kg)	So	Midlothian High School	Midlothian, Texas
F	13	Makai Willis	6 ft 8 in (2.03 m)	245 lb (111 kg)	Sr	Fairfield	Tallahassee, Florida
F	14	Jerry Ngopot	6 ft 11 in (2.11 m)	250 lb (113 kg)	Jr	Saint Peter's	Bangui, Central African Republic
G	21	Ajay Tew	5 ft 11 in (1.8 m)	175 lb (79 kg)	So	Jonesboro-Hodge High School	Jonesboro, Louisiana
F	22	Renars Sondors	6 ft 9 in (2.06 m)	189 lb (86 kg)	Fr	Marupe SC	Riga, Latvia
G	24	Coltie Young	6 ft 3 in (1.91 m)	210 lb (95 kg)	Sr	Jackson State	Starkville, Mississippi
F	34	AD Diedhiou	6 ft 11 in (2.11 m)	250 lb (113 kg)	Sr	UAB	Dakar, Senegal

Head coach

- Keith Richard (Louisiana–Monroe)

Assistant coach(es)

- Phil Cunningham (Campbellsville)
- Christopher Woodall (William Carey)
- Ronnie Dean (Harris–Stowe State)

Legend

- (C) Team captain
- (S) Suspended
- (I) Ineligible
- (W) Walk-on
- Injured
- Current redshirt

Roster
Last update: December 5, 2024

== Schedule and results ==
Date time, TV	Rank^{#}	Opponent^{#}	Result	Record	High points	High rebounds	High assists	Site (attendance) city, state
Non-conference regular season
November 4, 2024*; 7:30 pm, ESPN+		Champion Christian	W 111–61	1–0	16 – Ngopot	14 – Sondors	6 – Watson	Fant–Ewing Coliseum (1,028); Monroe, LA
November 6, 2024*; 7:00 pm, SECN+/ESPN+		at LSU	L 60–95	1–1	25 – Bolden	6 – Ngopot	2 – Tied	Pete Maravich Assembly Center (8,043); Baton Rouge, LA
November 8, 2024*; 6:30 pm, ESPN+		at Tulane	L 64–80	1–2	17 – Tied	9 – Diedhiou	5 – Young	Devlin Fieldhouse (1,447); New Orleans, LA
November 12, 2024*; 7:00 pm, ESPN+		at Rice	L 50–66	1–3	12 – Tied	8 – Bolden	3 – Watson	Tudor Fieldhouse (1,096); Houston, TX
November 14, 2024*; 6:30 pm, ESPN+		Ecclesia	W 110–48	2–3	18 – Willis	9 – Sondors	6 – Tied	Fant–Ewing Coliseum (517); Monroe, LA
November 18, 2024*; 6:30 pm, ESPN+		Southeastern Louisiana	L 67–70	2–4	19 – Young	6 – Willis	4 – Tied	Fant–Ewing Coliseum (1,190); Monroe, LA
November 22, 2024*; 6:30 pm, ESPN+		at Northwestern State; City of Lights Classic	W 65–63	3–4	16 – Watson	6 – Tied	3 – Tied	Prather Coliseum (388); Natchitoches, LA
November 23, 2024*; 4:00 pm		vs. North Alabama; City of Lights Classic	L 62–74	3–5	16 – Bolden	11 – Ngopot	5 – Watson	Prather Coliseum (112); Natchitoches, LA
November 29, 2024*; 6:30 pm, ESPN+		Stephen F. Austin	L 60–68	3–6	15 – Bolden	5 – Tied	4 – Bolden	Fant–Ewing Coliseum (1,336); Monroe, LA
December 2, 2024*; 6:30 pm, ESPN+		UT Arlington	L 70–84	3–7	16 – Tied	11 – Bolden	2 – Tied	Fant–Ewing Coliseum (947); Monroe, LA
December 11, 2024*; 6:30 pm, ESPN+		Arkansas–Pine Bluff	W 89–73	4–7	28 – Young	12 – Willis	11 – Watson	Fant–Ewing Coliseum (1,032); Monroe, LA
December 14, 2024*; 2:00 pm, ESPN+		at UT Arlington	L 68–77	4–8	18 – Willis	15 – Bolden	7 – Bolden	College Park Center (1,369); Arlington, TX
December 17, 2024*; 7:30 pm, ESPN+		Houston Christian	L 68–74	4–9	21 – Bolden	10 – Bolden	4 – Watson	Fant–Ewing Coliseum (1,212); Monroe, LA
Sun Belt regular season
December 21, 2024; 2:00 pm, ESPN+		Old Dominion	L 75–80 ^{OT}	4–10 (0–1)	23 – Wilson	11 – Willis	6 – Watson	Fant–Ewing Coliseum (1,058); Monroe, LA
January 2, 2025; 6:00 pm, ESPN+		at Georgia Southern	L 82–90	4–11 (0–2)	20 – Young	7 – Bolden	5 – Tied	Hill Convocation Center (1,357); Statesboro, GA
January 4, 2025; 1:00 pm, ESPN+		at Coastal Carolina	L 51–70	4–12 (0–3)	14 – Tied	5 – Tied	5 – Bolden	HTC Center (1,457); Conway, SC
January 9, 2025; 7:00 pm, ESPN+		at Southern Miss	L 67–84	4–13 (0–4)	17 – Bolden	10 – Willis	4 – Watson	Reed Green Coliseum (2,805); Hattiesburg, MS
January 11, 2025; 7:00 pm, ESPN+		at Louisiana	L 68–71	4–14 (0–5)	17 – Willis	9 – Bolden	5 – Young	Cajundome (2,005); Lafayette, LA
January 15, 2025; 6:30 pm, ESPN+		Troy	L 58–77	4–15 (0–6)	16 – Tied	8 – Willis	5 – Watson	Fant–Ewing Coliseum (1,154); Monroe, LA
January 18, 2025; 2:00 pm, ESPN+		Louisiana	L 60–65	4–16 (0–7)	16 – Bolden	7 – Tied	2 – Tied	Fant–Ewing Coliseum (1,514); Monroe, LA
January 25, 2025; 2:00 pm, ESPN+		Appalachian State	L 58–66	4–17 (0–8)	12 – Bolden	11 – Willis	5 – Watson	Fant–Ewing Coliseum (1,505); Monroe, LA
January 27, 2025; 6:30 pm, ESPN+		South Alabama; Rescheduled from January 23	W 77–66	5–17 (1–8)	27 – Young	8 – Wilson	9 – Watson	Fant–Ewing Coliseum (1,027); Monroe, LA
January 30, 2025; 7:00 pm, ESPN+		at South Alabama	W 62–58	6–17 (2–8)	22 – Watson	9 – Willis	5 – Watson	Mitchell Center (2,085); Mobile, AL
February 1, 2025; 3:33 pm, ESPN+		at Troy	L 50–87	6–18 (2–9)	15 – Willis	10 – Bolden	3 – Tied	Trojan Arena (3,672); Troy, AL
February 5, 2025; 6:00 pm, ESPN+		at Georgia State	L 64–97	6–19 (2–10)	19 – Young	8 – Diedhiou	6 – Bolden	GSU Convocation Center (1,441); Atlanta, GA
February 13, 2025; 6:30 pm, ESPN+		Texas State	L 60–72	6–20 (2–11)	20 – Bolden	8 – Ngopot	3 – Caster	Fant–Ewing Coliseum (1,135); Monroe, LA
February 15, 2025; 2:00 pm, ESPN+		Southern Miss	W 81–74	7–20 (3–11)	24 – Bolden	9 – Willis	10 – Watson	Fant–Ewing Coliseum (1,398); Monroe, LA
February 19, 2025; 7:30 pm, ESPN+		at Texas State	L 63–80	7–21 (3–12)	18 – Young	10 – Willis	3 – Watson	Strahan Arena (1,691); San Marcos, TX
February 22, 2025; 2:00 pm, ESPN+		at Arkansas State	L 70–95	7–22 (3–13)	21 – Willis	9 – Diedhiou	4 – Watson	First National Bank Arena (6,273); Jonesboro, AR
February 25, 2025; 6:30 pm, ESPN+		James Madison	L 79–85	7–23 (3–14)	26 – Watson	16 – Willis	3 – Watson	Fant–Ewing Coliseum (1,483); Monroe, LA
February 28, 2025; 6:30 pm, ESPN+		Arkansas State	L 67–94	7–24 (3–15)	19 – Watson	14 – Willis	7 – Watson	Fant–Ewing Coliseum (1,574); Monroe, LA
Sun Belt tournament
March 4, 2025; 7:30 pm, ESPN+	(14)	vs. (11) Louisiana; First round	L 69–73 ^{OT}	7–25	21 – Bolden	7 – Willis	3 – Watson	Pensacola Bay Center (868); Pensacola, FL
*Non-conference game. ^{#}Rankings from AP Poll. (#) Tournament seedings in parentheses. All times are in Central.
