= 2024–25 Southern Miss Golden Eagles basketball team =

American college basketball season

2024–25 Southern Miss Golden Eagles basketball
- Conference: Sun Belt Conference
- Record: 11–22 (5–13 Sun Belt)
- Head coach: Jay Ladner (6th season)
- Assistant coaches: Juan Cardona; Nick Williams; Isaiah Carson
- Home arena: Reed Green Coliseum

2024–25 Sun Belt Conference men's basketball standings
	Conf.				Overall
Team	W		L	PCT	W		L	PCT
South Alabama	13	–	5	.722	21	–	11	.656
James Madison	13	–	5	.722	20	–	12	.625
Troy †	13	–	5	.722	23	–	11	.676
Arkansas State	13	–	5	.722	25	–	11	.694
Marshall	12	–	6	.667	20	–	13	.606
Appalachian State	10	–	8	.556	17	–	14	.548
Texas State	9	–	9	.500	16	–	16	.500
Georgia State	8	–	10	.444	14	–	19	.424
Georgia Southern	8	–	10	.444	17	–	16	.515
Old Dominion	8	–	10	.444	15	–	20	.429
Louisiana	8	–	10	.444	12	–	21	.364
Southern Miss	5	–	13	.278	11	–	22	.333
Coastal Carolina	3	–	15	.167	10	–	22	.313
Louisiana–Monroe	3	–	15	.167	7	–	25	.219
† 2025 Sun Belt tournament winner

The 2024–25 Southern Miss Golden Eagles basketball team represented the University of Southern Mississippi during the 2024–25 NCAA Division I men's basketball season. The team, led by sixth-year head coach Jay Ladner, played their home games at Reed Green Coliseum in Hattiesburg, Mississippi as third-year members of the Sun Belt Conference.

== Previous season ==
The Golden Eagles finished the 2023–24 season 16–15, 9–9 in Sun Belt play, to finish in sixth place. They were defeated by Texas State in the second round of the Sun Belt tournament.

== Preseason ==
=== Preseason Sun Belt Conference poll ===
The Golden Eagles were picked to finish in fifth place in the conference's preseason poll. Senior guard André Curbelo was named to the conference preseason third team.

Coaches poll
Predicted finish	Team (1st-place votes)
1	Arkansas State – 193 (12)
2	James Madison – 170 (1)
3	Troy – 155 (1)
4	Louisiana – 144
5	Southern Miss – 133
6	App State – 122
7	Texas State – 89
T8	Georgia Southern – 85
T8	Old Dominion – 85
10	Marshall – 79
11	South Alabama – 78
12	Georgia State – 75
13	Coastal Carolina – 34
14	ULM – 28

== Roster ==
2024–25 Southern Miss Golden Eagles men's basketball team
Players
Coaches

Pos.	#	Name	Height	Weight	Year	Previous school	Hometown
G	0	Alfred Jr. Worrell	6 ft 4 in (1.93 m)	208 lb (94 kg)	Jr	John A. Logan College	Washington, D.C.
F	1	Deantoni Gordon	6 ft 7 in (2.01 m)	210 lb (95 kg)	GS	Little Rock	Mobile, AL
G	2	Brewer Carruth	6 ft 4 in (1.93 m)	195 lb (88 kg)	Jr	Parklane Academy	Dixie Springs Lake, MS
G	5	Jett Montgomery	5 ft 11 in (1.8 m)	190 lb (86 kg)	Fr	Independence HS	Franklin, TN
G	7	Christian Watson	6 ft 6 in (1.98 m)	205 lb (93 kg)	Jr	Miami (FL)	Lanham, MD
G	9	John III Wade	6 ft 4 in (1.93 m)	190 lb (86 kg)	GS	Stanislaus State	Oakland, CA
G	10	Cobie Montgomery	6 ft 4 in (1.93 m)	195 lb (88 kg)	GS	Triton College	Louisville, KY
G	11	André Curbelo	6 ft 0 in (1.83 m)	167 lb (76 kg)	RS Sr	St. John's	Vega Baja, Puerto Rico
G	12	Neftali Alvarez	6 ft 0 in (1.83 m)	195 lb (88 kg)	GS	Mercer	Cataño, Puerto Rico
F	13	Denijay Harris	6 ft 7 in (2.01 m)	200 lb (91 kg)	GS	Arkansas	Columbus, MS
G	14	Trey Alfonso	6 ft 1 in (1.85 m)	178 lb (81 kg)	GS	Fontainebleau HS	Mandeville, LA
G	15	Christian Reid	6 ft 4 in (1.93 m)	212 lb (96 kg)	Fr	Mater Lakes Academy	North Miami Beach, FL
G	20	Jeffery Armstrong	5 ft 11 in (1.8 m)	172 lb (78 kg)	GS	Massanutten Military Academy	Rainsville, AL
C	22	Tegra Izay	7 ft 0 in (2.13 m)	269 lb (122 kg)	RS Sr	Harcum College	Montreal, QC
G	23	Jose Benitez	6 ft 0 in (1.83 m)	182 lb (83 kg)	RS Jr	Francis Marion	Santo Domingo, Dominican Republic
G	24	Dalyn Brandon	6 ft 5 in (1.96 m)	190 lb (86 kg)	Sr	Winston-Salem State	Baltimore, MD
C	30	Lieb Yat	7 ft 0 in (2.13 m)	250 lb (113 kg)	RS Jr	Seminole State College	Melbourne, Australia

Head coach

- Jay Ladner (Southern Miss)

Assistant coach(es)

- Juan Cardona (Middle Georgia State)
- Nick Williams (Mississippi)
- Isaiah Carson (Valley Forge)

Legend

- (C) Team captain
- (S) Suspended
- (I) Ineligible
- (W) Walk-on
- Injured
- Current redshirt

Roster
Last update: December 4, 2024

== Schedule and results ==
Date time, TV	Rank^{#}	Opponent^{#}	Result	Record	High points	High rebounds	High assists	Site (attendance) city, state
Exhibition
October 22, 2024*; 7:00 p.m.		at New Orleans	W 105–102 ^{OT}		30 – Harris	15 – Harris	8 – Curbelo	Lakefront Arena (692); New Orleans, LA
October 28, 2024*; 6:00 p.m.		Jackson State	W 92–85 ^{OT}		29 – Curbelo	13 – Harris	6 – Curbelo	Reed Green Coliseum; Hattiesburg, MS
Non-conference regular season
November 4, 2024*; 7:00 p.m., ESPN+		Bowling Green; MAC–SBC Challenge	W 77–68	1–0	17 – Watson	8 – Gordon	8 – Curbelo	Reed Green Coliseum (3,436); Hattiesburg, MS
November 7, 2024*; 6:30 p.m., ESPN+		at UAB	L 84–98	1–1	21 – Alvarez	10 – Harris	5 – Watson	Bartow Arena (3,791); Birmingham, AL
November 12, 2024*; 7:00 p.m., ESPN+		Loyola New Orleans	W 104–65	2–1	15 – 2 tied	7 – Izay	6 – Curbelo	Reed Green Coliseum (3,187); Hattiesburg, MS
November 20, 2024*; 7:00 p.m., MidcoSN		at South Dakota State	L 76–101	2–2	13 – Alvarez	12 – Harris	4 – Curbelo	First Bank and Trust Arena (2,429); Brookings, SD
November 24, 2024*; 7:00 p.m., ESPN+		at Montana State; Basketball Travelers Invitational	L 67–74	2–3	19 – Watson	7 – Watson	5 – Alvarez	Worthington Arena (2,450); Bozeman, MT
November 25, 2024*; 8:00 p.m., ESPN+		vs. Abilene Christian; Basketball Travelers Invitational	L 74–82	2–4	21 – Alvarez	6 – Watson	5 – Alvarez	Worthington Arena (157); Bozeman, MT
November 30, 2025*; 1:00 p.m., ESPN+		Milwaukee	W 66–65	3–4	24 – Harris	8 – Harris	7 – Alvarez	Reed Green Coliseum (2,867); Hattiesburg, MS
December 5, 2024*; 2:30 p.m., ESPN+		Alabama State	W 81–64	4–4	21 – C. Montgomery	20 – Harris	4 – 2 tied	Reed Green Coliseum (2,888); Hattiesburg, MS
December 10, 2024*; 7:30 p.m., ESPN+		at Tulane	L 58–86	4–5	12 – Harris	9 – Harris	3 – 2 tied	Devlin Fieldhouse (1,254); New Orleans, LA
December 14, 2024*; 3:00 p.m., SECN		vs. No. 19 Ole Miss	L 46–77	4–6	16 – Harris	7 – Harris	3 – 2 tied	Mississippi Coast Coliseum (2,928); Biloxi, MS
December 17, 2024*; 7:00 p.m., ESPN+		Lamar	L 65–69	4–7	21 – Alvarez	12 – Harris	7 – Alvarez	Reed Green Coliseum (2,829); Hattiesburg, MS
December 21, 2024; 2:00 p.m., ESPN+		Marshall	W 68–66	5–7 (1–0)	29 – Harris	10 – Harris	4 – 2 tied	Reed Green Coliseum (3,204); Hattiesburg, MS
December 30, 2024*; 7:00 p.m., ESPN+		William Carey	W 80–70	6–7	32 – Harris	23 – Harris	5 – Curbelo	Reed Green Coliseum (3,197); Hattiesburg, MS
January 2, 2025; 6:00 p.m., ESPN+		at James Madison	L 72–83	6–8 (1–1)	24 – Curbelo	10 – Curbelo	3 – Curbelo	Atlantic Union Bank Center (4,460); Harrisonburg, VA
January 4, 2025; 3:00 p.m., ESPN+		at Old Dominion	L 71–74	6–9 (1–2)	19 – Curbelo	8 – Gordon	8 – Curbelo	Chartway Arena (5,069); Norfolk, VA
January 9, 2025; 7:00 p.m., ESPN+		Louisiana–Monroe	W 84–67	7–9 (2–2)	19 – Harris	18 – Harris	6 – Watson	Reed Green Coliseum (2,805); Hattiesburg, MS
January 11, 2025; 2:00 p.m., ESPN+		Texas State	W 92–88 ^{OT}	8–9 (3–2)	20 – Worrell Jr.	16 – Harris	6 – Curbelo	Reed Green Coliseum (3,130); Hattiesburg, MS
January 15, 2025; 7:00 p.m., ESPN+		at South Alabama	L 62–75	8–10 (3–3)	13 – Worrell Jr.	14 – Harris	5 – Watson	Mitchell Center (2,568); Mobile, AL
January 18, 2025; 4:00 p.m., ESPN+		at Texas State	L 82–85 ^{OT}	8–11 (3–4)	18 – Harris	14 – Harris	5 – Watson	Strahan Arena (1,349); San Marcos, TX
January 25, 2025; 7:00 p.m., ESPN+		at Louisiana	W 67–59	9–11 (4–4)	13 – Gordon	10 – Harris	3 – Curbelo	Cajundome (1,996); Lafayette, LA
January 27, 2025; 5:00 p.m., ESPN+		at Troy	L 61–70	9–12 (4–5)	21 – Harris	7 – Harris	5 – Curbelo	Trojan Arena (2,432); Troy, AL
January 29, 2025; 7:00 p.m., ESPN+		Arkansas State	L 68–81	9–13 (4–6)	22 – Gordon	11 – Harris	3 – Watson	Reed Green Coliseum (3,089); Hattiesburg, MS
February 1, 2025; 3:30 p.m., ESPN+		Georgia Southern	W 72–68	10–13 (5–6)	19 – Harris	8 – Gordon	7 – Curbelo	Reed Green Coliseum (3,616); Hattiesburg, MS
February 5, 2025; 5:30 p.m., ESPN+		at Appalachian State	L 58–60	10–14 (5–7)	16 – Curbelo	12 – Harris	7 – Curbelo	Holmes Center (2,236); Boone, NC
February 8, 2025*; 2:00 p.m., ESPN+		at Ball State; MAC–SBC Challenge	L 76–77	10–15	23 – Harris	13 – Harris	12 – Curbelo	Worthen Arena (3,420); Muncie, IN
February 12, 2025; 7:30 p.m., ESPN+		at Arkansas State	L 67–101	10–16 (5–8)	16 – Curbelo	5 – Alvarez	4 – Harris	First National Bank Arena (5,089); Jonesboro, AR
February 15, 2025; 2:00 p.m., ESPN+		at Louisiana–Monroe	L 74–81	10–17 (5–9)	24 – Harris	13 – Harris	6 – 2 tied	Fant–Ewing Coliseum (1,398); Monroe, LA
February 20, 2025; 7:00 p.m., ESPN+		Coastal Carolina	L 78–87	10–18 (5–10)	21 – Harris	11 – Harris	3 – Alvarez	Reed Green Coliseum (2,909); Hattiesburg, MS
February 22, 2025; 7:00 p.m., ESPN+		Louisiana	L 60–62	10–19 (5–11)	14 – Alvarez	17 – Harris	3 – 2 tied	Reed Green Coliseum (3,738); Hattiesburg, MS
February 26, 2025; 7:30 p.m., ESPN+		South Alabama	L 82–88	10–20 (5–12)	25 – Harris	11 – Harris	10 – Alvarez	Reed Green Coliseum (3,241); Hattiesburg, MS
February 28, 2025; 7:30 p.m., ESPN+		Troy	L 58–70	10–21 (5–13)	15 – Harris	8 – Harris	2 – 3 tied	Reed Green Coliseum (3,174); Hattiesburg, MS
Sun Belt tournament
March 4, 2025; 5:00 p.m., ESPN+	(12)	vs. (13) Coastal Carolina; First round	W 66–63	11–21	22 – Worrell Jr.	10 – Wade III	5 – Alvarez	Pensacola Bay Center (723); Pensacola, FL
March 5, 2025; 5:00 p.m., ESPN+	(12)	vs. (9) Georgia Southern; Second round	L 64–78	11–22	14 – Harris	7 – 2 tied	6 – Alvarez	Pensacola Bay Center (744); Pensacola, FL
*Non-conference game. ^{#}Rankings from AP poll. (#) Tournament seedings in parentheses. All times are in Central.
