= 2024–25 Georgia Southern Eagles men's basketball team =

American college basketball season

2024–25 Georgia Southern Eagles men's basketball
- Conference: Sun Belt Conference
- Record: 17–16 (8–10 Sun Belt)
- Head coach: Charlie Henry (2nd season)
- Assistant coaches: Kente' Hart; Dion Bethea; Nori Johnson; George Neilson
- Home arena: Hanner Fieldhouse (Note: Hosted their first 3 home games); Hill Convocation Center (Note: Hosted their remaining 11 home games)

2024–25 Sun Belt Conference men's basketball standings
	Conf.				Overall
Team	W		L	PCT	W		L	PCT
South Alabama	13	–	5	.722	21	–	11	.656
James Madison	13	–	5	.722	20	–	12	.625
Troy †	13	–	5	.722	23	–	11	.676
Arkansas State	13	–	5	.722	25	–	11	.694
Marshall	12	–	6	.667	20	–	13	.606
Appalachian State	10	–	8	.556	17	–	14	.548
Texas State	9	–	9	.500	16	–	16	.500
Georgia State	8	–	10	.444	14	–	19	.424
Georgia Southern	8	–	10	.444	17	–	16	.515
Old Dominion	8	–	10	.444	15	–	20	.429
Louisiana	8	–	10	.444	12	–	21	.364
Southern Miss	5	–	13	.278	11	–	22	.333
Coastal Carolina	3	–	15	.167	10	–	22	.313
Louisiana–Monroe	3	–	15	.167	7	–	25	.219
† 2025 Sun Belt tournament winner

The 2024–25 Georgia Southern Eagles men's basketball team represented Georgia Southern University in the 2024–25 NCAA Division I men's basketball season. The Eagles, led by second-year head coach Charlie Henry, played their first three home games at the Hanner Fieldhouse in Statesboro, Georgia and finished their remaining home games at the Hill Convocation Center following its opening on December 4. They were members of the Sun Belt Conference.

== Previous season ==
The Eagles finished the 2023–24 season 9–24, 8–10 in Sun Belt play. As the #9 seed the Sun Belt tournament, they defeated #8 South Alabama in the second round before losing to #1 seed Appalachian State in the quarterfinals.

== Preseason ==
=== Preseason Sun Belt Conference poll ===
Along with Old Dominion, the Eagles were picked to finish eighth in the conference's preseason poll.

Coaches poll
Predicted finish	Team (1st-place votes)
1	Arkansas State – 193 (12)
2	James Madison – 170 (1)
3	Troy – 155 (1)
4	Louisiana – 144
5	Southern Miss – 133
6	App State – 122
7	Texas State – 89
T8	Georgia Southern – 85
T8	Old Dominion – 85
10	Marshall – 79
11	South Alabama – 78
12	Georgia State – 75
13	Coastal Carolina – 34
14	ULM – 28

== Roster ==
2024–25 Georgia Southern Eagles men's basketball team
Players
Coaches

Pos.	#	Name	Height	Weight	Year	Previous school	Hometown
F	1	Braylhan Thomas	6 ft 6 in (1.98 m)	205 lb (93 kg)	Fr	Gray Academy	Atlanta, Georgia
G	2	Bradley Douglas	6 ft 1 in (1.85 m)	180 lb (82 kg)	Sr	Eustis High School; Little Rock	Eustis, Florida
F	3	Eugene Brown III	6 ft 8 in (2.03 m)	200 lb (91 kg)	GS	Ohio State	Conyers, Georgia
G	4	Dante Horne	6 ft 4 in (1.93 m)	190 lb (86 kg)	Sr	Kirby High School; Texas State	Memphis, Tennessee
G	5	Adanté Holiman	6 ft 0 in (1.83 m)	175 lb (79 kg)	Jr	McAlester High School; UTSA	McAlester, Oklahoma
F	7	Nakavieon White	6 ft 7 in (2.01 m)	220 lb (100 kg)	Jr	Permian High School; National Park	Odessa, Texas
F	8	Luke Keller (W)	6 ft 7 in (2.01 m)	225 lb (102 kg)	Sr	North Gwinnett High School	Suwanee, Georgia
F	11	Micah Smith	7 ft 7 in (2.31 m)	195 lb (88 kg)	Fr	Sandy Creek High School	Tyrone, Georgia
F	12	Tyler Bush	6 ft 5 in (1.96 m)	198 lb (90 kg)	Sr	Centre College	Union, Kentucky
G	13	Eren Banks	6 ft 4 in (1.93 m)	175 lb (79 kg)	So	Putnam County High School	Eatonton, Georgia
F	14	Collin Kuhl	6 ft 7 in (2.01 m)	220 lb (100 kg)	So	Holly Springs High School	Holly Springs, North Carolina
F	21	Tyson Brown	6 ft 9 in (2.06 m)	225 lb (102 kg)	Sr	Massanutten Military Academy; Rhode Island	Virginia Beach, Virginia
F	23	Nate Brafford	6 ft 9 in (2.06 m)	200 lb (91 kg)	Jr	Rabun Gap-Nacoochee School	Waynesville, North Carolina
G	24	Langston Boyf	6 ft 3 in (1.91 m)	189 lb (86 kg)	Fr	Mallard Creek High School	Charlotte, North Carolina
F	25	Avantae Parker	6 ft 9 in (2.06 m)	212 lb (96 kg)	So	Gray Academy	Columbia, South Carolina

Head coach

- Charlie Henry (Madonna)

Assistant coach(es)

- Kente' Hart (Purdue)
- Dion Bethea (Benedict)
- Nori Johnson (College of Charleston)
- George Neilson (Alabama)

Legend

- (C) Team captain
- (S) Suspended
- (I) Ineligible
- (W) Walk-on
- Injured
- Current redshirt

Roster
Last update: November 13, 2024

== Schedule and results ==
Date time, TV	Rank^{#}	Opponent^{#}	Result	Record	High points	High rebounds	High assists	Site (attendance) city, state
Non-conference regular season
November 4, 2024*; 7:00 pm, ESPN+		Northern Illinois; MAC/SBC Challenge	W 80–65	1–0	19 – Holiman	7 – Brafford	5 – Horne	Hanner Fieldhouse (2,520); Statesboro, GA
November 8, 2024*; 7:00 pm, FloSports		at UNC Wilmington	L 84–92	1–1	23 – Horne	5 – Brown	4 – Banks	Trask Coliseum (4,949); Wilmington, NC
November 11, 2024*; 7:00 pm, ESPN+		at Augusta	W 79–69	2–1	22 – Douglas	8 – Horne	5 – Horne	Hanner Fieldhouse (2,358); Statesboro, GA
November 15, 2024*; 7:30 pm		vs. North Carolina Central; Rock Hill Classic	W 80–75	3–1	24 – White	6 – White	4 – Banks	Winthrop Coliseum (1,324); Rock Hill, SC
November 16, 2024*; 5:00 pm, ESPN+		vs. Winthrop; Rock Hill Classic	W 89–87	4–1	23 – Holiman	8 – Brown III	4 – Douglas	Winthrop Coliseum; Rock Hill, SC
November 17, 2024*; 12:00 pm, ESPN+		vs. William & Mary; Rock Hill Classic	L 87–102	4–2	25 – White	6 – Tied	2 – Tied	Winthrop Coliseum; Rock Hill, SC
November 23, 2024*; 12:00 pm, ESPN+		West Georgia	W 64–54	5–2	20 – Holiman	12 – Brown	3 – Tied	Hanner Fieldhouse (1,552); Statesboro, GA
November 30, 2024*; 5:00 pm, ESPN+		at Drake	L 47–61	5–3	11 – Brown III	6 – White	4 – Horne	Knapp Center (3,061); Des Moines, IA
December 4, 2024*; 7:00 pm, ESPN+		at VCU	L 54–89	5–4	13 – Banks	6 – Brown	3 – Horne	Siegel Center (6,624); Richmond, VA
December 7, 2024*; 6:00 pm, ESPN+		North Florida	W 93–91 ^{OT}	6–4	21 – Douglas	10 – White	6 – White	Hill Convocation Center (2,838); Statesboro, GA
December 13, 2024*; 6:30 pm, ESPN+		at Louisiana Tech	L 63–77	6–5	20 – Douglas	7 – White	4 – Douglas	Thomas Assembly Center (1,831); Ruston, LA
December 17, 2024*; 7:00 pm, ESPN+		Gardner–Webb	W 86–81	7–5	31 – Douglas	8 – Douglas	7 – White	Hill Convocation Center (1,611); Statesboro, GA
Sun Belt regular season
December 21, 2024; 3:30 pm, ESPN+		at Texas State	L 61–83	7–6 (0–1)	17 – Douglas	6 – Kuhl	4 – Banks	Strahan Arena; San Marcos, TX
January 2, 2025; 7:00 pm, ESPN+		Louisiana–Monroe	W 90–82	8–6 (1–1)	30 – Douglas	8 – Kuhl	7 – Banks	Hill Convocation Center (1,357); Statesboro, GA
January 4, 2025; 3:00 pm, ESPN+		South Alabama	L 47–76	8–7 (1–2)	11 – Thomas	8 – Douglas	4 – Horne	Hill Convocation Center (1,582); Statesboro, GA
January 8, 2025; 8:00 pm, ESPN+		at Georgia State; Modern Day Hate	L 78–82 ^{OT}	8–8 (1–3)	19 – Holiman	14 – Brown	3 – Holiman	GSU Convocation Center (1,875); Atlanta, GA
January 11, 2025; 4:00 pm, ESPN+		at Marshall	L 69–81	8–9 (1–4)	22 – White	6 – Brown	2 – Tied	Cam Henderson Center (3,866); Huntington, WV
January 16, 2025; 7:00 pm, ESPN+		at Coastal Carolina	W 88–87 ^{OT}	9–9 (2–4)	20 – Douglas	11 – Brown	3 – Holiman	HTC Center (2,492); Conway, SC
January 18, 2025; 3:30 pm, ESPN+		at Old Dominion	W 67–63	10–9 (3–4)	28 – Holiman	9 – Parker	2 – Banks	Chartway Arena (5,739); Norkfolk, VA
January 23, 2025; 1:00 pm, ESPN+		Coastal Carolina	W 85–58	11–9 (4–4)	18 – Banks	8 – Banks	4 – Tied	Hill Convocation Center (1,335); Statesboro, GA
January 25, 2025; 3:00 pm, ESPN+		Marshall	L 67–71	11–10 (4–5)	26 – Holiman	7 – Brown	5 – Douglas	Hill Convocation Center (3,135); Statesboro, GA
January 30, 2025; 7:00 pm, ESPN+		at Troy	L 74–81	11–11 (4–6)	16 – Brown	11 – Brown	4 – Holiman	Trojan Arena (2,781); Troy, AL
February 1, 2025; 3:30 pm, ESPN+		at Southern Miss	L 68–72	11–12 (4–7)	24 – Holiman	12 – Brown	2 – Tied	Reed Green Coliseum (3,616); Hattiesburg, MS
February 5, 2025; 7:00 pm, ESPN+		Louisiana	W 83–82	12–12 (5–7)	24 – Holiman	8 – Brown	4 – Douglas	Hill Convocation Center (1,756); Statesboro, GA
February 8, 2025*; 1:00 pm, ESPN+		at Western Michigan; MAC–SBC Challenge	W 83–57	13–12	15 – Douglas	13 – Thomas	7 – Tied	University Arena (1,431); Kalamazoo, MI
February 13, 2025; 7:00 pm, ESPN+		James Madison	L 72–77	13–13 (5–8)	22 – Holiman	11 – Brown	5 – White	Hill Convocation Center (1,560); Statesboro, GA
February 15, 2025; 3:00 pm, ESPN+		Old Dominion	W 78–75	14–13 (6–8)	24 – Holiman	13 – Brown	5 – Tied	Hill Convocation Center (2,144); Statesboro, GA
February 20, 2025; 7:00 pm, ESPN+		at Appalachian State	L 74–79 ^{OT}	14–14 (6–9)	20 – Holiman	10 – Tied	4 – Banks	Holmes Center (3,152); Boone, NC
February 22, 2025; 5:00 pm, ESPN+		at James Madison	L 73–78	14–15 (6–10)	18 – Tied	11 – Brown III	2 – Tied	Atlantic Union Bank Center (6,428); Harrisonburg, VA
February 25, 2025; 7:00 pm, ESPN+		Appalachian State	W 61–59	15–15 (7–10)	17 – White	6 – White	4 – Tied	Hill Convocation Center (1,821); Statesboro, GA
February 28, 2025; 8:00 pm, ESPN+		Georgia State; Modern Day Hate	W 76–75	16–15 (8–10)	24 – Holiman	10 – Brown	7 – Douglas	Hill Convocation Center (3,484); Statesboro, GA
Sun Belt tournament
March 5, 2025; 6:00 pm, ESPN+	(9)	vs. (12) Southern Miss; Second round	W 78–64	17–15	16 – Banks	12 – Brown	5 – Holiman	Pensacola Bay Center (744); Pensacola, FL
March 6, 2025; 6:00 pm, ESPN+	(9)	vs. (8) Georgia State; Third round	L 71–80	17–16	25 – Holiman	7 – Brown	5 – White	Pensacola Bay Center; Pensacola, FL
*Non-conference game. ^{#}Rankings from AP Poll. (#) Tournament seedings in parentheses. All times are in Eastern Time.
