= 2024–25 Troy Trojans men's basketball team =

American college basketball season

2024–25 Troy Trojans men's basketball

Sun Belt regular season co-champions Sun Belt tournament champions

NCAA tournament, First Round
- Conference: Sun Belt Conference
- Record: 23–11 (13–5 Sun Belt)
- Head coach: Scott Cross (6th season)
- Associate head coach: Greg Young
- Assistant coaches: Brandon Gilbert; Mike Worley; Larry Cordaro; Kelvin Lewis
- Home arena: Trojan Arena

2024–25 Sun Belt Conference men's basketball standings
	Conf.				Overall
Team	W		L	PCT	W		L	PCT
South Alabama	13	–	5	.722	21	–	11	.656
James Madison	13	–	5	.722	20	–	12	.625
Troy †	13	–	5	.722	23	–	11	.676
Arkansas State	13	–	5	.722	25	–	11	.694
Marshall	12	–	6	.667	20	–	13	.606
Appalachian State	10	–	8	.556	17	–	14	.548
Texas State	9	–	9	.500	16	–	16	.500
Georgia State	8	–	10	.444	14	–	19	.424
Georgia Southern	8	–	10	.444	17	–	16	.515
Old Dominion	8	–	10	.444	15	–	20	.429
Louisiana	8	–	10	.444	12	–	21	.364
Southern Miss	5	–	13	.278	11	–	22	.333
Coastal Carolina	3	–	15	.167	10	–	22	.313
Louisiana–Monroe	3	–	15	.167	7	–	25	.219
† 2025 Sun Belt tournament winner

The 2024–25 Troy Trojans men's basketball team represented Troy University in the 2024–25 NCAA Division I men's basketball season. The Trojans, led by sixth-year head coach Scott Cross, played their home games at Trojan Arena in Troy, Alabama as members of the Sun Belt Conference.

== Previous season ==
The Trojans finished the 2023–24 season 20–12, 13–5 in Sun Belt play to finish in third place. The Trojans lost to Texas State in the quarterfinals of the Sun Belt Conference tournament.

== Offseason ==
=== Departures ===
Name	Number	Pos.	Height	Weight	Year	Hometown	Reason for departure
Marcus Friend	3	G	6'9"	193	Senior	Albany, NY	Graduated
Christyon Eugene	5	G	6'3"	210	Senior	Spring, TX	Graduated
Randi Ovalle	13	G	6'7"	225	RS freshman	Santiago, Dominican Republic	Transferred to New Mexico Junior College
Aamer Muhammad	23	G	6'1"	195	Senior	Rio Rancho, NM	Graduated

=== Incoming transfers ===
Name	Number	Pos.	Height	Weight	Year	Hometown	Previous school
Cobi Campbell	13	G	6'2"	195	Junior	Puyallup, WA	North Idaho College

=== Recruiting classes ===
==== 2024 recruiting class ====
College recruiting
Name	Hometown	School	Height	Weight	Commit date
Cooper Campbell; CG	Puyallup, WA	Phoenix Prep	6 ft 2 in (1.88 m)	175 lb (79 kg)	Sep 4, 2023
Cooper Campbell; CG	Recruit ratings: 247Sports:				
Jackson Porch; G	Guntersville, AL	Guntersville High School	6 ft 0 in (1.83 m)	175 lb (79 kg)	
Jackson Porch; G	Recruit ratings: No ratings found				
Evan Griffin; F	Geneva, AL	Geneva High School	6 ft 9 in (2.06 m)	N/A	
Evan Griffin; F	Recruit ratings: No ratings found				
Austin Cross; G	Mansfield, Texas	Charles Henderson High School	6 ft 3 in (1.91 m)	200 lb (91 kg)	
Austin Cross; G	Recruit ratings: No ratings found				
Overall recruit ranking:
Note: In many cases, Scout, Rivals, 247Sports, On3, and ESPN may conflict in their listings of height and weight.; In these cases, the average was taken. ESPN grades are on a 100-point scale.; Sources: "2024 Team Ranking". Rivals.

== Preseason ==
=== Preseason Sun Belt Conference poll ===
The Trojans were picked to finish in third place in the conference's preseason poll. Sophomore forward Myles Rigsby was named to the preseason All-SBC First Team. Senior guard Tayton Conerway was named to the conference preseason second team.

Coaches poll
Predicted finish	Team (1st place votes)
1	Arkansas State - 193 (12)
2	James Madison - 170 (1)
3	Troy - 155 (1)
4	Louisiana - 144
5	Southern Miss - 133
6	App State - 122
7	Texas State - 89
T8	Georgia Southern - 85
T8	Old Dominion - 85
10	Marshall - 79
11	South Alabama - 78
12	Georgia State - 75
13	Coastal Carolina - 34
14	ULM - 28

== Roster ==
2024–25 Troy Trojans men's basketball team
Players
Coaches

Pos.	#	Name	Height	Weight	Year	Previous school	Hometown
F	0	Kerrington Kiel	6 ft 6 in (1.98 m)	195 lb (88 kg)	RS Fr	Ramsay High School	Birmingham, Alabama
F	1	Thomas Dowd	6 ft 8 in (2.03 m)	225 lb (102 kg)	So	Dothan High School	Dothan, Alabama
G	2	Marcus Rigsby Jr.	6 ft 3 in (1.91 m)	203 lb (92 kg)	Jr	Tyler Junior College	Fort Worth, Texas
G	3	Cooper Campbell	6 ft 2 in (1.88 m)	185 lb (84 kg)	Fr	Phoenix Prep	Puyallup, Washington
F	4	Myles Rigsby	6 ft 6 in (1.98 m)	190 lb (86 kg)	So	O. D. Wyatt High School	Fort Worth, Texas
F	10	Jerrell Bellamy	6 ft 9 in (2.06 m)	210 lb (95 kg)	RS Jr	Chattahoochee Valley Community College	Phenix City, Alabama
F	11	Victor Valdes	6 ft 7 in (2.01 m)	233 lb (106 kg)	So	Zentro Basket Madrid	Monterrey, Nuevo León
G	12	Tayton Conerway	6 ft 3 in (1.91 m)	186 lb (84 kg)	Sr	Ranger College	Burleson, Texas
G	13	Cobi Campbell	6 ft 2 in (1.88 m)	195 lb (88 kg)	Jr	North Idaho College	Puyallup, Washington
G	14	Kamryn Mitchell (W)	6 ft 4 in (1.93 m)	185 lb (84 kg)	Jr	Houston Academy	Dothan, Alabama
F	15	Jackson Fields	6 ft 8 in (2.03 m)	210 lb (95 kg)	Jr	Lawrence E. Elkins High School	Missouri City, Texas
G	20	Jackson Porch	6 ft 0 in (1.83 m)	175 lb (79 kg)	Fr	Guntersville High School	Guntersville, Alabama
G	21	Braydon Whitaker	6 ft 0 in (1.83 m)	185 lb (84 kg)	Sr	Enterprise State Community College	Slocomb, Alabama
C	24	Randarius Jones	6 ft 7 in (2.01 m)	235 lb (107 kg)	Sr	Louisiana Southwest Community College	Monroe, Louisiana
F	25	Evan Griffin	6 ft 9 in (2.06 m)	220 lb (100 kg)	Fr	Geneva High School	Geneva, Alabama
G	30	Hikaru Awata	5 ft 8 in (1.73 m)	154 lb (70 kg)	Fr	Hachioji Senior High School	Hachioji, Japan
F	33	Theo Seng	6 ft 9 in (2.06 m)	220 lb (100 kg)	Sr	Eastern Arizona College	Davis, California
G	95	Austin Cross	6 ft 3 in (1.91 m)	200 lb (91 kg)	Fr	Charles Henderson High School	Mansfield, Texas

Head coach

- Scott Cross (UT Arlington)

Assistant coach(es)

- Greg Young (Howard Payne)
- Brandon Gilbert (North Texas)
- Mike Worley (Denver)
- Larry Cordaro (LSU)
- Kelvin Lewis (Houston)

Legend

- (C) Team captain
- (S) Suspended
- (I) Ineligible
- (W) Walk-on
- Injured
- Current redshirt

Roster
Last update: October 8, 2024

== Schedule and results ==
Date time, TV	Rank^{#}	Opponent^{#}	Result	Record	High points	High rebounds	High assists	Site (attendance) city, state
Non-conference regular season
November 4, 2024*; 6:00 p.m., ESPN+		Toledo; MAC-SBC Challenge	W 84–74	1–0	12 – 2 Tied	6 – Rigsby	6 – Conerway	Trojan Arena (3,369); Troy, AL
November 9, 2024*; 4:00 p.m., ESPN+		at New Orleans	W 78–61	2–0	15 – Fields	10 – Fields	6 – Conerway	Lakefront Arena (1,028); New Orleans, LA
November 13, 2024*; 7:00 p.m., SECN+		at No. 18 Arkansas	L 49–65	2–1	13 – Fields	7 – Dowd	6 – Conerway	Bud Walton Arena (19,200); Fayetteville, AR
November 17, 2024*; 4:00 p.m., B1G+		at Oregon	L 61–82	2–2	15 – Rigsby	8 – Conerway	5 – Conerway	Matthew Knight Arena (5,394); Eugene, OR
November 19, 2024*; 6:00 p.m., ESPN+		at West Georgia	W 84–65	3–2	15 – 2 Tied	7 – Fields	4 – 2 Tied	The Coliseum (1,342); Carrollton, GA
November 25, 2024*; 7:00 p.m., ESPN+		UTSA; Trojan Turkey Tipoff	W 86–72	4–2	17 – M. Rigsby	6 – Conerway	6 – Valdes	Trojan Arena (2,234); Troy, AL
November 29, 2024*; 1:00 p.m., ESPN+		Merrimack; Trojan Turkey Tipoff	L 68–72	4–3	15 – Rigsby	8 – Dowd	3 – 3 Tied	Trojan Arena (2,263); Troy, AL
December 1, 2024*; 2:00 p.m., ESPN+		Eastern Kentucky	W 84–74	5–3	20 – Rigsby	5 – Bellamy	5 – Conerway	Trojan Arena (2,346); Troy, AL
December 10, 2024*; 7:00 p.m., ESPN+		at No. 15 Houston	L 42–62	5–4	10 – Dowd	8 – Conerway	1 – 4 Tied	Fertitta Center (7,035); Houston, TX
December 14, 2024*; 4:30 p.m., ESPN+		Middle Georgia State	W 87–53	6–4	13 – Fields	8 – Rigsby	4 – Rigsby Jr.	Trojan Arena (2,451); Troy, AL
December 17, 2024*; 6:00 p.m., ESPN+		LaGrange	W 105–60	7–4	15 – Jones	9 – Fields	4 – Coo. Campbell	Trojan Arena (2,124); Troy, AL
Sun Belt regular season
December 21, 2024; 3:33 p.m., ESPN+		Georgia State	W 77–57	8–4 (1–0)	22 – Rigsby	6 – Dowd	5 – Conerway	Trojan Arena (2,672); Troy, AL
January 2, 2025; 5:30 p.m., ESPN+		at Appalachian State	W 69–61	9–4 (2–0)	16 – Conerway	6 – 2 Tied	8 – Conerway	Holmes Center (2,408); Boone, NC
January 4, 2025; 3:00 p.m., ESPN+		at Marshall	W 58–57	10–4 (3–0)	20 – Conerway	9 – Dowd	3 – 2 Tied	Cam Henderson Center (4,014); Huntington, WV
January 9, 2025; 6:00 p.m., ESPN+		Texas State	L 73–74	10–5 (3–1)	15 – Conerway	6 – Dowd	4 – Conerway	Trojan Arena (2,123); Troy, AL
January 11, 2025; 3:33 p.m., ESPN+		Arkansas State	L 78–84	10–6 (3–2)	32 – Conerway	7 – Dowd	7 – Conerway	Trojan Arena (3,456); Troy, AL
January 15, 2025; 6:30 p.m., ESPN+		at Louisiana–Monroe	W 77–58	11–6 (4–2)	16 – Campbell	10 – Kiel	12 – Conerway	Fant-Ewing Coliseum (1,154); Monroe, LA
January 18, 2025; 3:00 p.m., ESPN+		at South Alabama	L 63–64	11–7 (4–3)	23 – Conerway	6 – 3 Tied	4 – Conerway	Mitchell Center (5,148); Mobile, AL
January 25, 2025; 3:33 p.m., ESPN+		South Alabama	W 65–55	12–7 (5–3)	15 – Rigsby	10 – Fields	9 – Conerway	Trojan Arena (5,041); Troy, AL
January 27, 2025; 5:00 p.m., ESPN+		Southern Miss	W 70–61	13–7 (6–3)	17 – Conerway	9 – Dowd	4 – Conerway	Trojan Arena (2,432); Troy, AL
January 30, 2025; 6:00 p.m., ESPN+		Georgia Southern	W 81–74	14–7 (7–3)	15 – Conerway	8 – Dowd	5 – Conerway	Trojan Arena (2,781); Troy, AL
February 1, 2025; 3:33 p.m., ESPN+		Louisiana–Monroe	W 87–50	15–7 (8–3)	17 – Rigsby Jr.	8 – Conerway	5 – Conerway	Trojan Arena (3,672); Troy, AL
February 5, 2025; 6:00 p.m., ESPN+		at James Madison	L 61–64	15–8 (8–4)	18 – Conerway	7 – Conerway	5 – Conerway	Atlantic Union Bank Center (3,754); Harrisonburg, VA
February 8, 2025*; 12:00 p.m., ESPN+		at Miami (OH); MAC-SBC Challenge	L 62–69	15–9	20 – Conerway	8 – Dowd	4 – Valdes	Millett Hall (1,817); Oxford, OH
February 12, 2025; 7:30 p.m., ESPN+		at Louisiana	W 74–56	16–9 (9–4)	19 – 2 Tied	12 – Dowd	7 – Conerway	Cajundome (1,128); Lafayette, LA
February 15, 2025; 2:30 p.m., ESPN+		at Arkansas State	W 71–70	17–9 (10–4)	20 – Fields	8 – 2 Tied	4 – 2 Tied	First National Bank Arena (7,036); Jonesboro, AR
February 20, 2025; 6:00 p.m., ESPN+		Louisiana	L 69–72	17–10 (10–5)	16 – Conerway	13 – Conerway	8 – Conerway	Trojan Arena (3,978); Troy, AL
February 22, 2025; 3:33 p.m., ESPN+		Coastal Carolina	W 83–66	18–10 (11–5)	21 – Conerway	9 – Dowd	8 – Conerway	Trojan Arena (4,212); Troy, AL
February 25, 2025; 7:00 p.m., ESPN+		at Texas State	W 74–69	19–10 (12–5)	24 – Conerway	10 – Dowd	3 – 2 Tied	Strahan Arena (1,291); San Marcos, TX
February 28, 2025; 7:30 p.m., ESPN+		at Southern Miss	W 70–58	20–10 (13–5)	25 – Rigsby	12 – Dowd	3 – Conerway	Reed Green Coliseum (3,174); Hattiesburg, MS
Sun Belt tournament
March 8, 2025; 8:00 p.m., ESPN+	(3)	vs. (10) Old Dominion; Quarterfinals	W 75–59	21–10	18 – Conerway	8 – Rigsby	3 – Valdes	Pensacola Bay Center (2,669); Pensacola, FL
March 9, 2025; 7:30 p.m., ESPN+	(3)	vs. (2) James Madison; Semifinals	W 79–60	22–10	22 – Conerway	11 – Dowd	4 – Conerway	Pensacola Bay Center (3,362); Pensacola, FL
March 10, 2025; 6:00 p.m., ESPN2	(3)	vs. (4) Arkansas State; Championship	W 94–81	23–10	21 – Conerway	9 – Dowd	3 – Conerway	Pensacola Bay Center (3,187); Pensacola, FL
NCAA tournament
March 21, 2025*; 6:10 p.m., CBS	(14 MW)	vs. (3 MW) No. 18 Kentucky; First Round	L 57–76	23–11	17 – Rigsby	11 – Dowd	4 – 2 Tied	Fiserv Forum (16,894); Milwaukee, WI
*Non-conference game. ^{#}Rankings from AP Poll. (#) Tournament seedings in parentheses. MW=Midwest. All times are in Central.
