= 2024–25 James Madison Dukes men's basketball team =

American college basketball season

2024–25 James Madison Dukes men's basketball

Sun Belt regular season co-champions
- Conference: Sun Belt Conference
- Record: 20–12 (13–5 Sun Belt)
- Head coach: Preston Spradlin (1st season)
- Assistant coaches: Scott Combs; Dominic Lombardi; Cason Burk; Dionte Ferguson
- Home arena: Atlantic Union Bank Center

2024–25 Sun Belt Conference men's basketball standings
	Conf.				Overall
Team	W		L	PCT	W		L	PCT
South Alabama	13	–	5	.722	21	–	11	.656
James Madison	13	–	5	.722	20	–	12	.625
Troy †	13	–	5	.722	23	–	11	.676
Arkansas State	13	–	5	.722	25	–	11	.694
Marshall	12	–	6	.667	20	–	13	.606
Appalachian State	10	–	8	.556	17	–	14	.548
Texas State	9	–	9	.500	16	–	16	.500
Georgia State	8	–	10	.444	14	–	19	.424
Georgia Southern	8	–	10	.444	17	–	16	.515
Old Dominion	8	–	10	.444	15	–	20	.429
Louisiana	8	–	10	.444	12	–	21	.364
Southern Miss	5	–	13	.278	11	–	22	.333
Coastal Carolina	3	–	15	.167	10	–	22	.313
Louisiana–Monroe	3	–	15	.167	7	–	25	.219
† 2025 Sun Belt tournament winner

The 2024–25 James Madison Dukes men's basketball team represented James Madison University in the 2024–25 NCAA Division I men's basketball season. The Dukes,led by first-year head coach Preston Spradlin, played their home games at the Atlantic Union Bank Center in Harrisonburg, Virginia as members of the Sun Belt Conference.

== Previous season ==
The Dukes' 2023–24 season was the most successful year in school history, beginning the season with upsetting then-ranked No. 4 Michigan State, their first win over a ranked team since defeating California in 1992. This season also marked their first appearance as a ranked team in the AP poll in school history. The Dukes finished the 2023–24 season with a record of 28–3, 15–3 in Sun Belt play, to finish in second place. They defeated Marshall, Texas State and Arkansas State in the Sun Belt tournament to win the tournament championship. As a result, they received the conference's automatic bid to the NCAA tournament as the No. 12 seed in South region, marking the team's first trip to the NCAA tournament since 2013. They upset No. 5-seeded Wisconsin in the first round to advance on to the second round for the first time since 1983. There they lost to Duke in the second round, ending the season with a 32–4 overall record.

On March 25, 2024, head coach Mark Byington left the school to become the head coach at Vanderbilt.

== Preseason ==
=== Preseason Sun Belt Conference poll ===
The Dukes were picked to finish in second place in the conference's preseason poll. Redshirt senior guard Mark Freeman was named to the preseason All-SBC First Team. Junior guard Xavier Brown was named to the conference preseason third team.

Coaches poll
Predicted finish	Team (1st-place votes)
1	Arkansas State – 193 (12)
2	James Madison – 170 (1)
3	Troy – 155 (1)
4	Louisiana – 144
5	Southern Miss – 133
6	App State – 122
7	Texas State – 89
T8	Georgia Southern – 85
T8	Old Dominion – 85
10	Marshall – 79
11	South Alabama – 78
12	Georgia State – 75
13	Coastal Carolina – 34
14	ULM – 28

== Roster ==
2024–25 James Madison Dukes men's basketball team
Players
Coaches

Pos.	#	Name	Height	Weight	Year	Previous school	Hometown
G	0	Mark Freeman	5 ft 11 in (1.8 m)	170 lb (77 kg)	RS Sr	Morehead State	Memphis, TN
G	1	Xavier Brown	6 ft 2 in (1.88 m)	183 lb (83 kg)	Jr	Jamestown HS	Williamsburg, VA
G	2	Bryce Lindsay	6 ft 3 in (1.91 m)	194 lb (88 kg)	RS Fr	Texas A&M	Baltimore, MD
F	3	Eddie III Ricks	6 ft 7 in (2.01 m)	217 lb (98 kg)	So	Morehead State	Clarksville, TN
C	4	Elijah Hutchins-Everett	6 ft 11 in (2.11 m)	260 lb (118 kg)	Sr	Seton Hall	Orange, NJ
G	5	Justin Taylor	6 ft 6 in (1.98 m)	221 lb (100 kg)	Jr	Syracuse	Charlottesville, VA
F	7	Matt Hain	6 ft 7 in (2.01 m)	215 lb (98 kg)	RS Fr	Morehead State	Perth, Australia
G	8	Will Lovings-Watts	6 ft 5 in (1.96 m)	180 lb (82 kg)	So	Northern Illinois	Jeffersonville, IN
F	10	Ebenezer Dowuona	6 ft 11 in (2.11 m)	238 lb (108 kg)	Sr	Georgia Tech	Accra, Ghana
G	13	Noah Williams	6 ft 5 in (1.96 m)	203 lb (92 kg)	RS Sr	Washington	Seattle, WA
G	20	Jarrell Pope	5 ft 9 in (1.75 m)	185 lb (84 kg)	Sr	Princess Anne HS	Virginia Beach, VA
G/F	21	AJ Smith	6 ft 6 in (1.98 m)	225 lb (102 kg)	Jr	Southern Indiana	Edwardsville, IL
G	24	Redd Thompson	6 ft 0 in (1.83 m)	183 lb (83 kg)	Fr	John Marshall HS	Richmond, VA
G	30	Aidan Mckeon	6 ft 3 in (1.91 m)	195 lb (88 kg)	So	Freeman HS	Henrico, VA
F	33	Jerrell Roberson	6 ft 9 in (2.06 m)	245 lb (111 kg)	Jr	DeMatha HS	Upper Marlboro, MD
F	35	Shane Feden	6 ft 6 in (1.98 m)	175 lb (79 kg)	Sr	Woodbridge HS	Woodbridge, VA
F	44	Luke Anderson	6 ft 7 in (2.01 m)	232 lb (105 kg)	RS Sr	Florida Southern	Lakeland, FL

Head coach

- Preston Spradlin (Alice Lloyd)

Assistant coach(es)

- Scott Combs (Austin Peay)
- Dominic Lombardi (Indiana (PA))
- Cason Burk (Jackson State)
- Dionte Ferguson (South Alabama)

Legend

- (C) Team captain
- (S) Suspended
- (I) Ineligible
- (W) Walk-on
- Injured
- Current redshirt

Roster
Last update: November 26, 2024

== Schedule and results ==
Date time, TV	Rank^{#}	Opponent^{#}	Result	Record	High points	High rebounds	High assists	Site (attendance) city, state
Regular season
November 4, 2024*; 7:00 p.m., ESPN+		Ohio; MAC–SBC Challenge	W 88–78	1–0	23 – Brown	8 – Hutchins-Everett	4 – Freeman	Atlantic Union Bank Center (5,973); Harrisonburg, VA
November 9, 2024*; 6:00 p.m.		at Norfolk State	L 69–83	1–1	21 – Lindsay	10 – Smith	4 – Brown	Joseph G. Echols Memorial Hall (3,170); Norfolk, VA
November 12, 2024*; 7:00 p.m., ESPN+		Mary Baldwin	W 100–52	2–1	21 – Hutchins-Everett	12 – Hutchins-Everett	7 – Freeman	Atlantic Union Bank Center (4,516); Harrisonburg, VA
November 16, 2024*; 8:00 p.m., FloHoops		at Towson	L 63–67	2–2	21 – Edwards	8 – Bickerstaff	5 – Green III	TU Arena (3,036); Towson, MD
November 21, 2024*; 11:00 a.m., BallerTV		vs. UIC; Boardwalk Battle quarterfinals	W 99–81	3–2	28 – Lindsay	5 – Tied	7 – Freeman	Ocean Center (386); Daytona Beach, FL
November 22, 2024*; 3:30 p.m., BallerTV		vs. UC San Diego; Boardwalk Battle semifinals	L 67–73	3–3	17 – Lindsay	9 – Smith	4 – Brown	Ocean Center; Daytona Beach, FL
November 23, 2024*; 3:30 p.m., BallerTV		vs. Jacksonville State; Boardwalk Battle 3rd-place game	W 71–65	4–3	18 – Brown	9 – Smith	4 – Brown	Ocean Center; Daytona Beach, FL
November 29, 2024*; 4:00 p.m., ESPN+		George Mason	L 61–66	4–4	19 – Lindsay	10 – Smith	4 – Freeman	Atlantic Union Bank Center (4,611); Harrisonburg, VA
December 3, 2024*; 7:00 p.m., ESPN+		East Tennessee State	W 71–61	5–4	16 – Tied	6 – Tied	5 – Brown	Atlantic Union Bank Center (3,364); Harrisonburg, VA
December 7, 2024; 4:00 p.m., ESPN+		Utah Valley	W 78–61	6–4	18 – Lindsay	7 – Smith	7 – Brown	Atlantic Union Bank Center (3,726); Harrisonburg, VA
December 17, 2024*; 7:00 p.m., ACCN		at Wake Forest	L 58–75	6–5	14 – Freeman	4 – Tied	4 – Lindsay	LJVM Coliseum (7,463); Winston-Salem, NC
December 21, 2024; 2:00 p.m., ESPN+		at South Alabama	L 49–77	6–6 (0–1)	12 – Lindsay	6 – Ricks III	4 – Freeman	Mitchell Center (1,574); Mobile, AL
December 29, 2024*; 5:00 p.m., ESPN+		Midway	W 96–64	7–6	13 – Tied	8 – Tied	5 – Brown	Atlantic Union Bank Center (3,396); Harrisonburg, VA
January 2, 2025; 7:00 p.m., ESPN+		Southern Miss	W 83–72	8–6 (1–1)	30 – Freeman	7 – Tied	4 – Tied	Atlantic Union Bank Center (4,460); Harrisonburg, VA
January 4, 2025; 4:00 p.m., ESPN+		Arkansas State	W 67–62	9–6 (2–1)	18 – Brown	9 – Tied	2 – Tied	Atlantic Union Bank Center (5,079); Harrisonburg, VA
January 9, 2025; 7:00 p.m., ESPN+		at Marshall	L 78–80	9–7 (2–2)	31 – Freeman	7 – Tied	2 – Tied	Cam Henderson Center (4,009); Huntington, WV
January 11, 2025; 1:00 p.m., ESPN+		at Appalachian State	L 66–86	9–8 (2–3)	19 – Hutchins-Everett	9 – Hutchins-Everett	3 – Brown	Holmes Center (2,405); Boone, NC
January 16, 2025; 7:00 p.m., ESPN+		Marshall	W 67–64	10–8 (3–3)	13 – Brown	7 – Tied	4 – Freeman	Atlantic Union Bank Center (3,335); Harrisonburg, VA
January 18, 2025; 4:00 p.m., ESPN+		Appalachian State	L 50–58	10–9 (3–4)	13 – Lindsay	10 – Smith	4 – Freeman	Atlantic Union Bank Center (4,685); Harrisonburg, VA
January 22, 2025; 7:00 p.m., ESPN+		at Old Dominion; Royal Rivalry	W 74–60	11–9 (4–4)	21 – Smith	7 – Tied	3 – Tied	Chartway Arena (6,008); Norfolk, VA
January 25, 2025; 4:00 p.m., ESPN+		at Georgia State	W 86–79	12–9 (5–4)	19 – Lindsay	5 – Tied	4 – Brown	GSU Convocation Center (1,792); Atlanta, GA
January 30, 2025; 7:00 p.m., ESPN+		Coastal Carolina	W 73–64	13–9 (5–5)	29 – Freeman	8 – Smith	3 – Lindsay	Atlantic Union Bank Center (4,387); Harrisonburg, VA
February 1, 2025; 4:00 p.m., ESPN+		Old Dominion; Royal Rivalry	W 68–54	14–9 (7–4)	14 – Lindsay	9 – Smith	3 – Tied	Atlantic Union Bank Center (6,192); Harrisonburg, VA
February 5, 2025; 7:00 p.m., ESPN+		Troy	W 64–61	15–9 (8–4)	14 – Tied	6 – Ricks III	2 – Freeman	Atlantic Union Bank Center (3,754); Harrisonburg, VA
February 8, 2025*; 2:00 p.m., ESPN+		at Toledo; MAC–SBC Challenge	L 69–72	15–10	23 – Freeman	8 – Smith	5 – Lindsay	Savage Arena (4,438); Toledo, OH
February 13, 2025; 7:00 p.m., ESPN+		at Georgia Southern	W 77–72	16–10 (9–4)	26 – Freeman	7 – Smith	4 – Lindsay	Hill Convocation Center (1,560); Statesboro, GA
February 15, 2025; 2:00 p.m., ESPN+		at Coastal Carolina	W 74–73	17–10 (10–4)	23 – Freeman	12 – Hutchins-Everett	2 – Brown	HTC Center (1,630); Conway, SC
February 20, 2025; 7:00 p.m., ESPN+		Georgia State	W 83–63	18–10 (11–4)	23 – Lindsay	10 – Smith	4 – Tied	Atlantic Union Bank Center (4,101); Harrisonburg, VA
February 22, 2025; 4:00 p.m., ESPN+		Georgia Southern	W 78–73	19–10 (12–4)	18 – Lindsay	9 – Smith	4 – Brown	Atlantic Union Bank Center (6,428); Harrisonburg, VA
February 25, 2025; 7:30 p.m., ESPN+		at Louisiana–Monroe	W 85–79	20–10 (13–4)	27 – Freeman	8 – Ricks III	4 – Tied	Fant–Ewing Coliseum (1,483); Monroe, LA
February 28, 2025; 8:00 p.m., ESPN+		at Texas State	L 93–102 ^{2OT}	20–11 (13–5)	22 – Hutchins-Everett	12 – Hutchins-Everett	4 – Freeman	Strahan Arena (1,526); San Marcos, TX
Sun Belt tournament
March 9, 2025; 8:30 p.m., ESPN+	(2)	vs. (3) Troy; Semifinals	L 60–79	20–12	34 – Freeman	9 – Lindsay	2 – Lindsay	Pensacola Bay Center (3,362); Pensacola, FL
*Non-conference game. ^{#}Rankings from AP poll. (#) Tournament seedings in parentheses. S=South. All times are in Eastern.
