= 2024–25 Sun Belt Conference men's basketball season =

- League: NCAA Division I
- Sport: Basketball
- Duration: November 4, 2024 – February 28, 2025
- Teams: 14
- TV partner: ESPN

2024–25 NCAA Division I men's basketball season
- Regular season champions: South Alabama, James Madison, Troy, Arkansas State
- Season MVP: Tayton Conerway, Troy

Tournament
- Champions: Troy
- Runners-up: Arkansas State
- Finals MVP: Tayton Conerway, Troy

Basketball seasons
- ← 2023–24 2025–26 →

2024–25 Sun Belt Conference men's basketball standings
	Conf.				Overall
Team	W		L	PCT	W		L	PCT
South Alabama	13	–	5	.722	21	–	11	.656
James Madison	13	–	5	.722	20	–	12	.625
Troy †	13	–	5	.722	23	–	11	.676
Arkansas State	13	–	5	.722	25	–	11	.694
Marshall	12	–	6	.667	20	–	13	.606
Appalachian State	10	–	8	.556	17	–	14	.548
Texas State	9	–	9	.500	16	–	16	.500
Georgia State	8	–	10	.444	14	–	19	.424
Georgia Southern	8	–	10	.444	17	–	16	.515
Old Dominion	8	–	10	.444	15	–	20	.429
Louisiana	8	–	10	.444	12	–	21	.364
Southern Miss	5	–	13	.278	11	–	22	.333
Coastal Carolina	3	–	15	.167	10	–	22	.313
Louisiana–Monroe	3	–	15	.167	7	–	25	.219
† 2025 Sun Belt tournament winner

The 2024–25 Sun Belt Conference men's basketball season was the season for Sun Belt Conference men's basketball teams that began with practices in October 2024, followed by the start of the 2024–25 NCAA Division I men's basketball season in November. Conference play began in December 2024, and concluded on February 28, 2025. The 2025 Sun Belt Conference men's basketball tournament took place from March 4–10, 2025, at the Pensacola Bay Center in Pensacola, Florida.

== Head coaches ==
=== Coaching changes ===
==== Coastal Carolina ====
On December 6, 2023, head coach Cliff Ellis retired with assistant coach Benny Moss named interim head coach for the rest of the season. On March 12, 2024, Western Carolina head coach Justin Gray was named new head coach.

==== James Madison ====
On March 25, 2024, Mark Byington left to become head coach of Vanderbilt. On March 29, 2024, Morehead State head coach Preston Spradlin was named new head coach of the Dukes.

==== Louisiana ====
Head coach Bob Marlin was fired on December 19, 2024, after 15 seasons with the Ragin' Cajuns. Assistant coach Derrick Zimmerman was named interim head coach for the remainder of the season.

==== Marshall ====
On March 25, 2024, head coach Dan D'Antoni and Marshall parted ways. Later that day, associate head coach Cornelius Jackson was named his successor.

==== Old Dominion ====
Jeff Jones resigned following a heart attack he had on December 20, 2023, and special assistant coach Kieran Donahue was named interim head coach for the rest of the season. Jones retired on February 26, 2024. Former Old Dominion player and Maryland assistant coach Mike Jones was named new head coach on March 1, 2024.

=== Coaches ===
Team	Head coach	Previous job	Years at school	Overall record	Sun Belt record	Sun Belt titles	Sun Belt Tournament titles	NCAA Tournaments
Appalachian State	Dustin Kerns	Presbyterian	6	110–77 (.588)	66–43 (.606)	1	1	1
Arkansas State	Bryan Hodgson	Alabama (Asst.)	2	42–27 (.609)	24–12 (.667)	0	0	0
Coastal Carolina	Justin Gray	Western Carolina	1	10–21 (.323)	3–15 (.167)	0	0	0
Georgia Southern	Charlie Henry	Alabama (Asst.)	2	25–39 (.391)	6–20 (.231)	0	0	0
Georgia State	Jonas Hayes	Xavier (Assoc.)	3	28–57 (.329)	19–35 (.352)	0	0	0
James Madison	Preston Spradlin	Morehead State	1	20–11 (.645)	13–5 (.722)	0	0	0
Louisiana	Bob Marlin	Sam Houston	15	269–198 (.576)	151–103 (.594)	1	1	1
Louisiana	Derrick Zimmerman (interim)	Louisiana (Asst.)	4	8–11 (.421)	7–10 (.412)	0	0	0
Louisiana–Monroe	Keith Richard	LSU (Asst.)	15	170–296 (.365)	94–180 (.343)	0	0	0
Marshall	Cornelius Jackson	Marshall (Assoc.)	1	19–12 (.613)	12–6 (.667)	0	0	0
Old Dominion	Mike Jones	Maryland (Asst.)	1	14–19 (.424)	.444	0	0	0
South Alabama	Richie Riley	Nicholls State	7	131–93 (.585)	70–55 (.560)	0	0	0
Southern Miss	Jay Ladner	Southeastern Louisiana	6	76–111 (.406)	38–69 (.355)	0	0	0
Texas State	Terrence Johnson	Texas State (Asst.)	5	86–67 (.562)	46–38 (.548)	2	0	0
Troy	Scott Cross	TCU (Asst.)	6	103–86 (.545)	56–50 (.528)	0	0	0

== Preseason ==
=== Preseason Coaches Poll ===
On October 14, 2024, the conference announced a preseason conference poll as voted by the league's 14 head coaches.

Rank	Team
1.	Arkansas State(12)
2.	James Madison (1)
3.	Troy (1)
4.	Louisiana
5.	Southern Miss
6.	Appalachian State
7.	Texas State
8.	Georgia Southern; Old Dominion
10.	Marshall
11.	South Alabama
12.	Georgia State
13.	Coastal Carolina
14.	Louisiana–Monore

==== Sun Belt preseason player of the year ====
- Kobe Julian – Arkansas State

==== Preseason All-Sun Belt team ====
2024-25 Sun Belt Men's Basketball Preseason All-Conference Teams
First Team	Second Team	Third Team
Mark Freeman – James Madison; Kobe Julian – Arkansas State; Hosana Kitenge - Louisiana; Nate Martin – Marshall; Myles Rigsby – Troy	Obinna Anochili-Killen – Marshall; Tayton Conerway – Troy; C.J. Huntley – Appalachian State; Toneari Lane – Georgia State; Taryn Todd – Arkansas State	Xavier Brown – Appalachian State; Andre Curbelo – Southern Miss; Tyrel Morgan – Texas State; Izaiyah Nelson – Arkansas State; Myles Tate – Appalachian State

== Regular season ==
=== Early season tournaments ===
Team	Tournament	Finish
Appalachian State	Live Oak Bank Holiday Classic	2nd
Arkansas State	Baha Mar Hoops Nassau Championship	
Coastal Carolina	Alabama A&M Bulldog Bash	
Georgia Southern	Rock Hill Classic	3rd
Georgia State	Jacksonville Classic	–
James Madison	Boardwalk Battle	3rd
Louisiana	Paradise Jam	8th
Old Dominion	Cayman Islands Classic	8th
South Alabama	Jaguar Classic	3rd
Texas State	Myrtle Beach Invitational	5th

=== Player of the week ===
Week	Player(s) of the Week	School
Nov 11	Jackson Fields	Troy
Nov 18	Nate Martin	Marshall
Nov 25	Bryce Lindsey	James Madison
Dec 2	Myles Corey	South Alabama
Dec 9	Denijay Harris	Southern Miss
Dec 16	Taryn Todd	Arkansas State
Dec 23	Robert Davis Jr.	Old Dominion
Dec 30	Tyrel Morgan	Texas State
Jan 6	Tayton Conerway	Troy
Jan 13	Sean Durugordon	Old Dominion
Jan 20	Tylan Pope	Texas State
Jan 27	Jalen Speer	Marshall
Feb 3	Mark Freeman	James Madison
Feb 10	Myles Tate	Appalachian State
Feb 17	Cesare Edwards	Georgia State
Feb 24	Barry Dunning Jr.	South Alabama
Mar 3	Izaiyah Nelson	Arkansas State

=== Records against other conferences ===
Power 6 Conferences
Conference	Record
ACC	0–3
Big East	0–0
Big Ten	0–2
Big 12	0–5
Pac–12	0–0
SEC	0–8
Combined	0–18
Other NCAA Division I Conferences	Record
America East	0–0
American	6–10
ASUN	7–1
Atlantic 10	0–5
Big Sky	0–0
Big South	3–4
Big West	0–1
CAA	5–7
Conference USA	3–8
Horizon	2–1
Independents/Non-Division I	2–0
Ivy	1–0
MAAC	0–1
MAC	14–13
MEAC	0–1
Missouri Valley	2–2
Mountain West	0–0
Northeast	0–0
OVC	3–1
Patriot	1–0
Southern	2–1
Southland	2–0
SWAC	7–7
Summit	0–1
West Coast	0–0
WAC	2–5
Combined	62–69

== Postseason ==
=== Sun Belt tournament ===
First round Tuesday, March 4 ESPN+
12	Southern Miss	66
13	Coastal Carolina	63
11	Louisiana	73*
14	Louisiana–Monroe	69

Second round Wednesday, March 5 ESPN+
9	Georgia Southern	78
12	Southern Miss	64
10	Old Dominion	67
11	Louisiana	49

Third round Thursday, March 6 ESPN+
8	Georgia State	80
9	Georgia Southern	71
7	Texas State	61
10	Old Dominion	64

Fourth round Friday, March 7 ESPN+
5	Marshall	79
8	Georgia State	76
6	Appalachian State	56
10	Old Dominion	61

Quarterfinals; Saturday, March 8 ESPN+
4	Arkansas State	77
5	Marshall	74
3	Troy	75
10	Old Dominion	59

Semifinals; Sunday, March 9 ESPN+
1	South Alabama	71
4	Arkansas State	74
2	James Madison	60
3	Troy	79

Championship; Monday, March 10; ESPN2
4	Arkansas State	81
3	Troy	94

* – Denotes overtime period

- The tournament was held at the Pensacola Bay Center in Pensacola, Florida, from March 4–10, 2025.

=== NCAA tournament ===
Seed	Region	School	First Four	1st round
14	Midwest	Troy	Bye	L 57–76 #3 Kentucky – (Milwaukee, WI)
		W–L (%):	0–0 (–)	0–1 (.000) Total: 0–1 (.000)

=== National Invitation Tournament ===
Seed	Bracket	School	1st round	2nd round
3	Dallas	Arkansas State	W 103–78 Saint Louis – (Jonesboro, Arkansas)	L 63–65 #2 North Texas – (Denton, Texas)
		W–L (%):	1–0 (1.000)	0–1 (.000) Total: 1–1 (.500)

== Honors and awards ==
=== Sun Belt Awards ===
2024-25 Sun Belt Men's Basketball Individual Awards
Award	Recipient(s)
Player of the Year	Tayton Conerway – Troy
Coach of the Year	Richie Riley – South Alabama
Defensive Player of the Year	Obinna Anochili-Killen - Marshall
Newcomer of the Year	Mark Freeman – James Madison
Freshman of the Year	Bryce Lindsay – James Madison
Sixth Man Award	Bryce Lindsay – James Madison

2024-25 Sun Belt Men's Basketball All-Conference Teams
First Team	Second Team	Third Team
Tayton Conerway - Troy; Barry Dunning Jr. – South Alabama; Mark Freeman – James Madison; Myles Tate – Appalachian State; Taryn Todd – Arkansas State	Obinna Anochili-Killen – Marshall; Cesare Edwards – Georgia State; Denijay Harris – Southern Miss; C. J. Huntley – Appalachian State; Tylan Pope — Texas State	Myles Corey – South Alabama; Sean Durugordon – Old Dominion; Adante' Holiman – Georgia Southern; Bryce Lindsay – James Madison; Izaiyah Nelson – Arkansas State
