= 2025 Sun Belt Conference men's basketball tournament =

U.S. collegiate basketball event

- Classification: Division I
- Season: 2024–25
- Teams: 14
- Site: Pensacola Bay Center; Pensacola, Florida
- Champions: Troy (2nd title)
- Winning coach: Scott Cross (1st title)
- MVP: Tayton Conerway (Troy)
- Attendance: 22,605 (total); 3,187 (championship)
- Television: ESPN+, ESPN2

2024–25 Sun Belt Conference men's basketball standings
	Conf.				Overall
Team	W		L	PCT	W		L	PCT
South Alabama	13	–	5	.722	21	–	11	.656
James Madison	13	–	5	.722	20	–	12	.625
Troy †	13	–	5	.722	23	–	11	.676
Arkansas State	13	–	5	.722	25	–	11	.694
Marshall	12	–	6	.667	20	–	13	.606
Appalachian State	10	–	8	.556	17	–	14	.548
Texas State	9	–	9	.500	16	–	16	.500
Georgia State	8	–	10	.444	14	–	19	.424
Georgia Southern	8	–	10	.444	17	–	16	.515
Old Dominion	8	–	10	.444	15	–	20	.429
Louisiana	8	–	10	.444	12	–	21	.364
Southern Miss	5	–	13	.278	11	–	22	.333
Coastal Carolina	3	–	15	.167	10	–	22	.313
Louisiana–Monroe	3	–	15	.167	7	–	25	.219
† 2025 Sun Belt tournament winner

The 2025 Sun Belt Conference men's basketball tournament was the postseason men's basketball tournament for Sun Belt Conference during the 2024–25 NCAA Division I men's basketball season. All tournament games were played at Pensacola Bay Center between March 4–10, 2025. The winner, Troy, received the conference's automatic bid to the 2025 NCAA tournament.

== Seeds ==
All fourteen conference teams qualified for the tournament. Teams were seeded by record within the conference, with a procedural tiebreaker system set to seed teams with identical conference records. The conference adopted a unique stepladder system giving the top two teams byes to the tournament semifinals and the No. 3 and No. 4 teams byes to the tournament quarterfinals. The conference changed the tournament format in an effort to reward teams that played well during the regular season. The top ten teams received at least one bye.

Seed	School	Conference Record	Tiebreaker 1	Tiebreaker 2	Tiebreaker 3	Tiebreaker 4
1	South Alabama	13–5	4–1 vs. JMU/Troy/ARST			
2	James Madison	13–5	2–1 vs. USA/Troy/ARST	2–0 vs. Troy/ARST		
3	Troy	13–5	2–3 vs. USA/JMU/ARST	1–2 vs. JMU/ARST	1–1 vs. ARST	1-2 vs. USA/JMU
4	Arkansas State	13–5	1–4 vs. USA/JMU/Troy	1–2 vs. JMU/Troy	1–1 vs. Troy	0–3 vs. USA/JMU
5	Marshall	12–6				
6	Appalachian State	10–8				
7	Texas State	9–9				
8	Georgia State	8–10	4–1 vs. GASO/ODU/UL	1–1 vs. Marshall		
9	Georgia Southern	8–10	4–1 vs. GSU/ODU/UL	0–2 vs. Marshall	3–0 vs. ODU/UL	
10	Old Dominion	8–10	1–4 vs. GSU/GASO/UL		1–2 vs. GASO/UL	1–0 vs. UL
11	Louisiana	8–10	0–3 vs. GSU/GASO/ODU		0–2 vs. GASO/ODU	0–1 vs. ODU
12	Southern Miss	5–13				
13	Coastal Carolina	3–15	1–0 vs. ULM			
14	Louisiana–Monroe	3–15	0–1 vs. CCU			

== Schedule ==
Game	Time	Matchup	Score	Television
First round – Tuesday, March 4
1	5:00 pm	No. 12 Southern Miss vs. No. 13 Coastal Carolina	66–63	ESPN+
2	7:30 pm	No. 11 Louisiana vs. No. 14 Louisiana–Monroe	73–69 ^{OT}	ESPN+
Second round – Wednesday, March 5
3	5:00 pm	No. 9 Georgia Southern vs. No. 12 Southern Miss	78–64	ESPN+
4	7:30 pm	No. 10 Old Dominion vs. No. 11 Louisiana	67–49	ESPN+
Third round – Thursday, March 6
5	5:00 pm	No. 8 Georgia State vs. No. 9 Georgia Southern	80–71	ESPN+
6	7:30 pm	No. 7 Texas State vs. No. 10 Old Dominion	61–64	ESPN+
Fourth round – Friday, March 7
7	5:00 pm	No. 5 Marshall vs. No. 8 Georgia State	79–76	ESPN+
8	7:30 pm	No. 6 Appalachian State vs. No. 10 Old Dominion	56–61	ESPN+
Quarterfinals – Saturday, March 8
9	5:30 pm	No. 4 Arkansas State vs. No. 5 Marshall	77–74	ESPN+
10	8:00 pm	No. 3 Troy vs. No. 10 Old Dominion	75–59	ESPN+
Semifinals – Sunday, March 9
11	5:00 pm	No. 1 South Alabama vs. No. 4 Arkansas State	71–74	ESPN+
12	7:30 pm	No. 2 James Madison vs. No. 3 Troy	60–79	ESPN+
Championship – Monday, March 10
13	6:00 pm	No. 4 Arkansas State vs. No. 3 Troy	81–94	ESPN2
Game times in CST through the quarterfinals and CDT for the semifinals and championship. Rankings denote tournament seed.

== Bracket ==
First round Tuesday, March 4 ESPN+
12	Southern Miss	66
13	Coastal Carolina	63
11	Louisiana	73
14	Louisiana–Monroe	69 ^{OT}

Second round Wednesday, March 5 ESPN+
9	Georgia Southern	78
12	Southern Miss	64
10	Old Dominion	67
11	Louisiana	49

Third round Thursday, March 6 ESPN+
8	Georgia State	80
9	Georgia Southern	71
7	Texas State	61
10	Old Dominion	64

Fourth round Friday, March 7 ESPN+
5	Marshall	79
8	Georgia State	76
6	Appalachian State	56
10	Old Dominion	61

Quarterfinals; Saturday, March 8 ESPN+
4	Arkansas State	77
5	Marshall	74
3	Troy	75
10	Old Dominion	59

Semifinals; Sunday, March 9 ESPN+
1	South Alabama	71
4	Arkansas State	74
2	James Madison	60
3	Troy	79

Final; Monday, March 10; ESPN2
4	Arkansas State	81
3	Troy	94

== Game summaries ==
All times are in CT (UTC−6 from March 4 through 8 and UTC−5 on March 9 and 10)

=== First round ===
ESPN+

March 4
5:00 p.m.

Box

No. 12 Southern Miss 66, No. 13 Coastal Carolina 63
Scoring by half: 29–29, 37–34
Pts: Worrell Jr. (22); Rebs: Wade III (10); Asts: Alvarez (5)	Pts: Granger (19); Rebs: Amenhauser (10); Asts: Battle (4)
Southern Miss advances to SBC second round

Pensacola Bay Center
Pensacola, FL
Attendance: 723
Referees: Landon Brandes, Anthony Eades, John Johnson

ESPN+

March 4
7:30 p.m.

Box

No. 11 Louisiana 73, No. 14 Louisiana–Monroe 69 (OT)
Scoring by half: 26–24, 37–39 Overtime: 10–6
Pts: El Moutaouakkil (28); Rebs: Cook (9); Asts: Wright (5)	Pts: Bolden (21); Rebs: Willis (7); Asts: Watson (3)
Louisiana advances to SBC second round

Pensacola Bay Center
Pensacola, FL
Attendance: 868
Referees: Anthony Jordan, Derek Schulte, Chase Shaw

=== Second round ===
ESPN+

March 5
5:00 p.m.

Box

No. 9 Georgia Southern 78, No. 12 Southern Miss 64
Scoring by half: 33–24, 45–40
Pts: Banks (16); Rebs: Brown (12); Asts: Holiman (5)	Pts: Harris (14); Rebs: Tied - Gordon, Wade III (7); Asts: Alvarez (6)
Georgia Southern advances to SBC third round

Pensacola Bay Center
Pensacola, FL
Attendance: 744
Referees: Mike Nance, Derek Schulte, Michael Swoboda

ESPN+

March 5
7:30 p.m.

Box

No. 10 Old Dominion 67, No. 11 Louisiana 49
Scoring by half: 29–23, 38–26
Pts: Durugordon (21); Rebs: Tied - Durugordon, Swanton-Rodger (10); Asts: Johnson (9)	Pts: El Moutaouakkil (22); Rebs: Thomas (6); Asts: Tied - Cook, Hardy, Ratliff (1)
Old Dominion advances to SBC third round

Pensacola Bay Center
Pensacola, FL
Attendance: 838
Referees: Rob Rorke, Luke Chittum, Michael Wallace

=== Third round ===
ESPN+

March 6
5:00 p.m.

Box

No. 8 Georgia State 80, No. 9 Georgia Southern 71
Scoring by half: 36–28, 44–43
Pts: Lane (22); Rebs: Edwards (13); Asts: Nutter (3)	Pts: Holiman (25); Rebs: Brown (7); Asts: White (5)
Georgia State advances to SBC fourth round

Pensacola Bay Center
Pensacola, FL
Attendance: 919
Referees: Jose Carrion, Chuck Jones, Luke Chittum

ESPN+

March 6
7:30 p.m.

Box

No. 7 Texas State 61, No. 10 Old Dominion 64
Scoring by half: 29–27, 32–37
Pts: Pope (15); Rebs: O'Garro (10); Asts: Benson (4)	Pts: Davis Jr. (23); Rebs: Durugordon (12); Asts: Tied (3) (Davis Jr., Johnson, Swanton-Rodger)
Old Dominion advances to SBC fourth round

Pensacola Bay Center
Pensacola, FL
Attendance: 1,064
Referees: Rob Rorke, Tucson Grigg, Michael Swoboda

=== Fourth round ===
ESPN+

March 7
5:00 p.m.

Box

No. 5 Marshall 79, No. 8 Georgia State 76
Scoring by half: 34–39, 45–37
Pts: Mingo (19); Rebs: Martin (14); Asts: Mingo (8)	Pts: Hamilton (28); Rebs: Edwards (9); Asts: Brown (3)
Marshall advances to SBC quarterfinals

Pensacola Bay Center
Pensacola, FL
Attendance: 1,201
Referees: Chris Ford, Hunter Allen, Tim Fitzgerald

ESPN+

March 7
7:30 p.m.

Box

No. 6 Appalachian State 56, No. 10 Old Dominion 61
Scoring by half: 36–30, 20–31
Pts: Huntley (18); Rebs: Huntley (12); Asts: Dodd (5)	Pts: Durugordon (21); Rebs: Durugordon (12); Asts: Johnson (3)
Old Dominion advances to SBC quarterfinals

Pensacola Bay Center
Pensacola, FL
Attendance: 1,469
Referees: Sean Casady, Erroll Lewis, Stephen Orkus Jr

=== Quarterfinals ===
ESPN+

March 8
5:30 p.m.

Box

No. 4 Arkansas State 77, No. 5 Marshall 74
Scoring by half: 39–36, 38–38
Pts: Todd (19); Rebs: Nelson (14); Asts: Ford Jr. (3)	Pts: Anochili-Killen (26); Rebs: Anochili-Killen (13); Asts: Mingo (6)
Arkansas State advances to SBC semifinals

Pensacola Bay Center
Pensacola, FL
Attendance: 2,370
Referees: Sean Casady, Hunter Allen, Stephen Orkus Jr

ESPN+

March 8
8:00 p.m.

Box

No. 3 Troy 75, No. 10 Old Dominion 59
Scoring by half: 36–18, 39–41
Pts: Conerway (18); Rebs: Rigsby (8); Asts: Valdes (3)	Pts: Blakney (20); Rebs: Durugordon (16); Asts: Tied - Blakney, Johnson (4)
Troy advances to SBC semifinals

Pensacola Bay Center
Pensacola, FL
Attendance: 2,669
Referees: Sidney Cohen, Chris Ford, Tim Fitzgerald

=== Semifinals ===
ESPN+

March 9
5:00 p.m.

Box

No. 1 South Alabama 71, No. 4 Arkansas State 74
Scoring by half: 34–37, 37–37
Pts: Dunning Jr. (27); Rebs: Dunning Jr. (13); Asts: Tied - Corey, Fasoyiro (2)	Pts: Pinion (23); Rebs: Tied - Dominguez, Pinion (6); Asts: Pinion (5)
Arkansas State advances to SBC championship

Pensacola Bay Center
Pensacola, FL
Attendance: 3,191
Referees: Terry Oglesby, Courtney Green, Owen Shortt

ESPN+

March 9
7:30 p.m.

Box

No. 2 James Madison 60, No. 3 Troy 79
Scoring by half: 23–40, 37–39
Pts: Freeman (34); Rebs: Lindsay (9); Asts: Lindsay (2)	Pts: Conerway (22); Rebs: Dowd (11); Asts: Conerway (4)
Troy advances to SBC championship

Pensacola Bay Center
Pensacola, FL
Attendance: 3,362
Referees: K.B. Burdett, Bart Lenox, Steve Orkus

=== Championship ===
ESPN2

March 10
6:00 p.m.

Box

No. 4 Arkansas State 81, No. 3 Troy 94
Scoring by half: 43–41, 38–53
Pts: Dominguez (19); Rebs: Nelson (10); Asts: Ford Jr. (7)	Pts: Conerway (21); Rebs: Dowd (9); Asts: Conerway (3)
Troy wins SBC championship

Pensacola Bay Center
Pensacola, FL
Attendance: 3,187
Referees: Chuck Jones, Owen Shortt, K.B. Burdett Jr.

== Awards and honors ==
Tournament MVP: Tayton Conerway, Troy

SBC All-Tournament Team
- Tayton Conerway, Troy
- Thomas Dowd, Troy
- Terrance Ford Jr., Arkansas State
- Izaiyah Nelson, Arkansas State
- Obinna Anochili-Killen, Marshall
- Sean Durugordon, Old Dominion

== See also ==
- 2025 Sun Belt Conference women's basketball tournament
