= 2024–25 Texas State Bobcats men's basketball team =

American college basketball season

2024–25 Texas State Bobcats men's basketball
- Conference: Sun Belt Conference
- Record: 16–16 (9–9 Sun Belt)
- Head coach: Terrence Johnson (5th season)
- Associate head coach: Bennie Seltzer
- Assistant coaches: Donte Mathis; Jay Smith; Aaron Proctor
- Home arena: Strahan Arena

2024–25 Sun Belt Conference men's basketball standings
	Conf.				Overall
Team	W		L	PCT	W		L	PCT
South Alabama	13	–	5	.722	21	–	11	.656
James Madison	13	–	5	.722	20	–	12	.625
Troy †	13	–	5	.722	23	–	11	.676
Arkansas State	13	–	5	.722	25	–	11	.694
Marshall	12	–	6	.667	20	–	13	.606
Appalachian State	10	–	8	.556	17	–	14	.548
Texas State	9	–	9	.500	16	–	16	.500
Georgia State	8	–	10	.444	14	–	19	.424
Georgia Southern	8	–	10	.444	17	–	16	.515
Old Dominion	8	–	10	.444	15	–	20	.429
Louisiana	8	–	10	.444	12	–	21	.364
Southern Miss	5	–	13	.278	11	–	22	.333
Coastal Carolina	3	–	15	.167	10	–	22	.313
Louisiana–Monroe	3	–	15	.167	7	–	25	.219
† 2025 Sun Belt tournament winner

The 2024–25 Texas State Bobcats men's basketball team represented Texas State University in the 2024–25 NCAA Division I men's basketball season. The Bobcats, led by fifth-year head coach Terrence Johnson, played their home games at Strahan Arena in San Marcos, Texas as members of the Sun Belt Conference.

== Previous season ==
The Bobcats finished the 2023–24 season 14–17, 7–11 in Sun Belt play, to finish in a tie for tenth place. In the Sun Belt Conference tournament, the Bobcats beat Old Dominion in the first round, Southern Miss in the second round, and Troy in the quarterfinals, before losing to James Madison in the semifinals.

== Preseason ==
=== Preseason Sun Belt Conference poll ===
The Bobcats were picked to finish in seventh place in the conference's preseason poll. Graduate student forward Tyrel Morgan was named to the conference preseason third team.

Coaches poll
Predicted finish	Team (1st place Votes)
1	Arkansas State - 193 (12)
2	James Madison - 170 (1)
3	Troy - 155 (1)
4	Louisiana - 144
5	Southern Miss - 133
6	App State - 122
7	Texas State – 89
T8	Georgia Southern - 85
T8	Old Dominion - 85
10	Marshall - 79
11	South Alabama - 78
12	Georgia State - 75
13	Coastal Carolina - 34
14	ULM - 28

== Roster ==
2024–25 Texas State Bobcats men's basketball team
Players
Coaches

Pos.	#	Name	Height	Weight	Year	Previous school	Hometown
G	0	Dylan Dawson	6 ft 3 in (1.91 m)	180 lb (82 kg)	Sr	Atascocita HS	Humble, TX
F	1	Tyrel Morgan	6 ft 5 in (1.96 m)	185 lb (84 kg)	GS	Northern Oklahoma College–Tonkawa	Atlanta, GA
G	2	Franck Emmou	6 ft 5 in (1.96 m)	190 lb (86 kg)	So	UMBC	Arlington, TX
G	4	Mark Drone	6 ft 0 in (1.83 m)	180 lb (82 kg)	Jr	Southwest Mississippi CC	Jackson, MS
F	5	Bessanty Saragba	6 ft 10 in (2.08 m)	216 lb (98 kg)	Jr	Ellsworth CC	Marseille, France
F	6	Austin Green	6 ft 8 in (2.03 m)	215 lb (98 kg)	Jr	Pearl River CC	Sicklerville, NJ
F	9	Tylan Pope	6 ft 6 in (1.98 m)	240 lb (109 kg)	RS Sr	Nevada	Franklinton, LA
G	11	Kaden Gumbs	6 ft 2 in (1.88 m)	179 lb (81 kg)	So	San Marcos HS	San Marcos, TX
G	14	Jaylen Jones	5 ft 11 in (1.8 m)	170 lb (77 kg)	Jr	Belmont Abbey	Charlotte, NC
G	22	Coleton Benson	6 ft 1 in (1.85 m)	170 lb (77 kg)	Jr	Army	Austin, TX
G	23	Joshua O'Garro	6 ft 6 in (1.98 m)	175 lb (79 kg)	Sr	Colby CC	George Town, Cayman Islands
F	24	Nate Dear	6 ft 9 in (2.06 m)	240 lb (109 kg)	Jr	Howard College	Adelaide, Australia
F	30	Christian Turner	6 ft 7 in (2.01 m)	220 lb (100 kg)	Jr	Troy	Grand Prairie, TX
G	55	Drue Drinnon	6 ft 1 in (1.85 m)	180 lb (82 kg)	GS	Navarro College	Smyrna, GA

Head coach

- Terrence Johnson (Southern)

Assistant coach(es)

- Bennie Seltzer (Washington State)
- Donte Mathis (Texas State)
- Jay Smith (LSU–Alexandria)
- Aaron Proctor (Cal State San Bernardino)

Legend

- (C) Team captain
- (S) Suspended
- (I) Ineligible
- (W) Walk-on
- Injured
- Current redshirt

Roster
Last update: December 3, 2024

== Schedule and results ==
Date time, TV	Rank^{#}	Opponent^{#}	Result	Record	High points	High rebounds	High assists	Site (attendance) city, state
Non-conference regular season
November 4, 2024*; 7:00 p.m., ESPN+		Eastern Michigan; MAC–SBC Challenge	W 64–44	1–0	15 – Gumbs	8 – O’Garro	4 – Gumbs	Strahan Arena (1,292); San Marcos, TX
November 8, 2024*; 7:00 p.m., ESPN+		McMurry	W 102–62	2–0	27 – Gumbs	10 – Gumbs	6 – O'Garro	Strahan Arena (1,387); San Marcos, TX
November 12, 2024*; 7:00 p.m., ESPN+		at TCU	L 71–76	2–1	17 – Pope	8 – Turner	6 – Drinnon	Schollmaier Arena (4,815); Fort Worth, TX
November 16, 2024*; 2:30 p.m., ESPN+		at Abilene Christian	L 60–72	2–2	19 – Turner	14 – Love	3 – Gumbs	Moody Coliseum (1,801); Abilene, TX
November 21, 2024*; 4:30 p.m., ESPNU		vs. Bradley; Myrtle Beach Invitational Quarterfinals	L 68–82	2–3	19 – Gumbs	7 – Tied	3 – Tied	HTC Center (660); Conway, SC
November 22, 2024*; 6:30 p.m., ESPN+		vs. Princeton; Myrtle Beach Invitational consolation 2nd round	W 83–80	3–3	27 – Morgan	8 – Pope	7 – Gumbs	HTC Center (1,352); Conway, SC
November 24, 2024*; 7:00 p.m., ESPN2		vs. Ohio; Myrtle Beach Invitational 5th place game	W 74–65	4–3	24 – Pope	11 – Morgan	5 – Gumbs	HTC Center (1,431); Conway, SC
December 1, 2024*; 4:00 p.m.		at Texas Southern	W 72–59	5–3	18 – Turner	9 – Morgan	7 – Tied	H&PE Arena (385); Houston, TX
December 4, 2024*; 7:00 p.m., ESPN+		Arlington Baptist	W 97–49	6–3	15 – Green	11 – Pope	9 – Drinnon	Strahan Arena (817); San Marcos, TX
December 8, 2024*; 1:00 p.m., ESPN+		Rice	W 75–66	7–3	20 – Morgan	10 – Morgan	6 – Gumbs	Strahan Arena (1,597); San Marcos, TX
December 14, 2024*; 1:00 p.m., ESPN+		at Florida Atlantic	L 80–89	7–4	19 – Morgan	9 – O'Garro	5 – Morgan	Eleanor R. Baldwin Arena (3,161); Boca Raton, FL
December 21, 2024; 2:30 p.m., ESPN+		Georgia Southern	W 83–61	8–4 (1–0)	23 – Pope	10 – Morgan	8 – Gumbs	Strahan Arena; San Marcos, TX
December 29, 2024*; 4:00 p.m., ESPN+		UT Arlington	L 72–80	8–5	22 – Morgan	8 – Morgan	9 – Gumbs	Strahan Arena (1,023); San Marcos, TX
January 2, 2025; 6:00 p.m., ESPN+		at Marshall	L 71–77	8–6 (1–1)	17 – Morgan	9 – O'Garro	2 – Gumbs	Cam Henderson Center (3,694); Huntington, WV
January 4, 2025; 12:00 p.m., ESPN+		at Appalachian State	L 61–72	8–7 (1–2)	16 – Morgan	5 – Morgan	3 – Tied	Holmes Center (2,512); Boone, NC
January 9, 2025; 6:00 p.m., ESPN+		at Troy	W 74–73	9–7 (2–2)	27 – Pope	10 – Pope	4 – Gumbs	Trojan Arena (2,123); Troy, AL
January 11, 2025; 2:00 p.m., ESPN+		at Southern Miss	L 88–92 ^{OT}	9–8 (2–3)	30 – Drone	8 – Morgan	5 – Gumbs	Reed Green Coliseum (3,130); Hattiesburg, MS
January 15, 2025; 7:00 p.m., ESPN+		Georgia State	W 94–80	10–8 (3–3)	20 – Pope	13 – Green	6 – Gumbs	Strahan Arena (2,292); San Marcos, TX
January 18, 2025; 4:00 p.m., ESPN+		Southern Miss	W 85–82 ^{OT}	11–8 (4–3)	28 – Pope	12 – Tied	7 – Turner	Strahan Arena (1,349); San Marcos, TX
January 23, 2025; 3:00 p.m., ESPN+		at Louisiana	W 89–74	12–8 (5–3)	25 – Pope	9 – O'Garro	2 – Tied	Cajundome (867); Lafayette, LA
January 25, 2025; 12:00 p.m., ESPN+		at Arkansas State	L 65–80	12–9 (5–4)	21 – O'Garro	13 – O'Garro	6 – Gumbs	First National Bank Arena (5,791); Jonesboro, AR
January 30, 2025; 7:00 p.m., ESPN+		Louisiana	L 61–70	12–10 (5–5)	17 – Gumbs	7 – O'Garro	4 – Turner	Strahan Arena (1,709); San Marcos, TX
February 1, 2025; 4:00 p.m., ESPN+		Arkansas State	L 74–85	12–11 (5–6)	17 – Pope	5 – Pope	6 – Tied	Strahan Arena (1,441); San Marcos, TX
February 5, 2025; 6:00 p.m., ESPN+		at Old Dominion	L 64–75	12–12 (5–7)	23 – Pope	10 – O'Garro	5 – Gumbs	Chartway Arena (5,474); Norfolk, VA
February 8, 2025*; 4:00 p.m., ESPN+		at Central Michigan; MAC–SBC Challenge	L 70–85	12–13	13 – Pope	6 – Turner	6 – Gumbs	McGuirk Arena (1,244); Mount Pleasant, MI
February 13, 2025; 6:30 p.m., ESPN+		at Louisiana–Monroe	W 72–60	13–13 (6–7)	22 – Pope	9 – Turner	6 – Drinnon	Fant–Ewing Coliseum (1,135); Monroe, LA
February 15, 2025; 3:00 p.m., ESPN+		at South Alabama	L 65–70 ^{OT}	13–14 (6–8)	20 – Pope	15 – Pope	3 – Drone	Mitchell Center (2,169); Mobile, AL
February 19, 2025; 7:30 p.m., ESPN+		Louisiana–Monroe	W 80–63	14–14 (7–8)	16 – Pope	10 – Turner	5 – Turner	Strahan Arena (1,691); San Marcos, TX
February 22, 2025; 4:30 p.m., ESPN+		South Alabama	W 93–92 ^{OT}	15–14 (8–8)	20 – Morgan	12 – Pope	6 – Drone	Strahan Arena (2,523); San Marcos, TX
February 25, 2025; 7:00 p.m., ESPN+		Troy	L 69–74	15–15 (8–9)	25 – Pope	7 – Morgan	3 – Tied	Strahan Arena (1,291); San Marcos, TX
February 28, 2025; 7:00 p.m., ESPN+		James Madison	W 102–93 ^{2OT}	16–15 (9–9)	23 – Pope	6 – Tied	3 – Tied	Strahan Arena (1,526); San Marcos, TX
Sun Belt tournament
March 6, 2025; 7:30 p.m., ESPN+	(7)	vs. (10) Old Dominion; Third round	L 61–64	16–16	15 – Pope	10 – O'Garro	4 – Benson	Pensacola Bay Center; Pensacola, FL
*Non-conference game. ^{#}Rankings from AP poll. (#) Tournament seedings in parentheses. All times are in Central.
