= 2024–25 Coastal Carolina Chanticleers men's basketball team =

American college basketball season

2024–25 Coastal Carolina Chanticleers men's basketball
- Conference: Sun Belt Conference
- Record: 10–22 (3–15 Sun Belt)
- Head coach: Justin Gray (1st season)
- Assistant coaches: Jayson Gee; Ryne Lightfoot; Kyle Taylor; Zack Freesman
- Home arena: HTC Center

2024–25 Sun Belt Conference men's basketball standings
	Conf.				Overall
Team	W		L	PCT	W		L	PCT
South Alabama	13	–	5	.722	21	–	11	.656
James Madison	13	–	5	.722	20	–	12	.625
Troy †	13	–	5	.722	23	–	11	.676
Arkansas State	13	–	5	.722	25	–	11	.694
Marshall	12	–	6	.667	20	–	13	.606
Appalachian State	10	–	8	.556	17	–	14	.548
Texas State	9	–	9	.500	16	–	16	.500
Georgia State	8	–	10	.444	14	–	19	.424
Georgia Southern	8	–	10	.444	17	–	16	.515
Old Dominion	8	–	10	.444	15	–	20	.429
Louisiana	8	–	10	.444	12	–	21	.364
Southern Miss	5	–	13	.278	11	–	22	.333
Coastal Carolina	3	–	15	.167	10	–	22	.313
Louisiana–Monroe	3	–	15	.167	7	–	25	.219
† 2025 Sun Belt tournament winner

The 2024–25 Coastal Carolina Chanticleers men's basketball team represented Coastal Carolina University in the 2024–25 NCAA Division I men's basketball season. The Chanticleers, led by 1st-year head coach Justin Gray, played their home games at the HTC Center in Conway, South Carolina as members of the Sun Belt Conference.

== Offseason ==
Justin Gray was hired as the head coach of Coastal Carolina on March 11, 2024. He was previously the head coach at Western Carolina, where he led Western Carolina to consecutive winning seasons for the first time in 13 years.

== Preseason ==
=== Preseason Sun Belt Conference poll ===
The Chanticleers were picked to finish in thirteenth place in the conference's preseason poll.

Coaches poll
Predicted finish	Team (1st-place votes)
1	Arkansas State – 193 (12)
2	James Madison – 170 (1)
3	Troy – 155 (1)
4	Louisiana – 144
5	Southern Miss – 133
6	App State – 122
7	Texas State – 89
T8	Georgia Southern – 85
T8	Old Dominion – 85
10	Marshall – 79
11	South Alabama – 78
12	Georgia State – 75
13	Coastal Carolina – 34
14	ULM – 28

== Roster ==
2024–25 Coastal Carolina Chanticleers men's basketball team
Players
Coaches

Pos.	#	Name	Height	Weight	Year	Previous school	Hometown
G	0	DA Houston	6 ft 2 in (1.88 m)	210 lb (95 kg)	GS	Longwood	Houston, TX
G	2	Rasheed Jones	6 ft 6 in (1.98 m)	180 lb (82 kg)	RS So	Western Carolina	Marion, IN
F	3	Braeden MacVicar	6 ft 11 in (2.11 m)	205 lb (93 kg)	So	Rothesay Netherwood School	Port Williams, Nova Scotia
G	5	Joshua Meo	6 ft 4 in (1.93 m)	195 lb (88 kg)	Jr	Mineral Area College	Orlando, FL
G	7	Andre Mulibea	6 ft 6 in (1.98 m)	225 lb (102 kg)	RS Jr	Eastern Washington	Kigoma, Tanzania
G	10	Naz Brown	6 ft 1 in (1.85 m)	185 lb (84 kg)	So	Oklahoma State	Fort Worth, TX
G	11	Jackson Keil	6 ft 2 in (1.88 m)	185 lb (84 kg)	Jr	Western Wyoming Community College	Sterling, CO
G	13	Henry Abraham	5 ft 10 in (1.78 m)	180 lb (82 kg)	GS	Eastern Illinois	Cambridge, MN
F	14	Marcus Watson	6 ft 5 in (1.96 m)	220 lb (100 kg)	GS	Towson	Buford, GA
F	15	Jordan Battle	6 ft 2 in (1.88 m)	185 lb (84 kg)	Jr	Salt Lake Community College	Chesapeake, VA
F	20	Connor Martin	6 ft 4 in (1.93 m)	200 lb (91 kg)	RS So	Trevecca	Clinton, TN
C	21	Noah Amenhauser	7 ft 2 in (2.18 m)	255 lb (116 kg)	So	Grand Canyon	Goodyear, AZ
F	22	Denzel Hines	6 ft 7 in (2.01 m)	210 lb (95 kg)	So	High Point	Fontana, CA
G	30	Charles Dunlap	6 ft 2 in (1.88 m)	170 lb (77 kg)	Jr	Spring Valley High School	Columbia, SC
C	32	Colin Granger	6 ft 9 in (2.06 m)	235 lb (107 kg)	GS	Western Carolina	Johns Creek, GA
C	50	Mabor Majak	7 ft 1 in (2.16 m)	250 lb (113 kg)	GS	Missouri	Fishers, IN

Head coach

- Justin Gray (Wake Forest)

Assistant coach(es)

- Jayson Gee (Charleston (WV))
- Ryne Lightfoot (Bethel (IN))
- Kyle Taylor (UCLA)
- Zack Freesman (North Florida)

Legend

- (C) Team captain
- (S) Suspended
- (I) Ineligible
- (W) Walk-on
- Injured
- Current redshirt

Roster
Last update: October 14, 2024

== Schedule and results ==
Date time, TV	Rank^{#}	Opponent^{#}	Result	Record	High points	High rebounds	High assists	Site (attendance) city, state
Regular season
November 4, 2024*; 7:00 p.m., ESPN+		Western Michigan; MAC-SBC Challenge	W 60–56	1–0	15 – Jones	11 – Lobsinger	3 – Battle	HTC Center (2,192); Conway, SC
November 9, 2024*; 4:00 p.m., ESPN+		at East Carolina	L 59–63	1–1	20 – Jones	12 – Hines	3 – Battle	Minges Colliseum (4,331); Greenville, NC
November 13, 2024*; 7:00 p.m., ACCN		at NC State	L 70–82	1–2	17 – Jones	8 – Hines	3 – Abraham	Lenovo Center (12,425); Raleigh, NC
November 17, 2024*; 2:00 p.m., ESPN+		Jacksonville State	L 53–71	1–3	31 – Pierre Jr.	8 – Nicholson	3 – Pierre Jr.	HTC Center (1,604); Conway, SC
November 22, 2024*; 5:00 p.m.		vs. IU Indy; Alabama A&M MTE	W 71–57	2–3	11 – Jones	10 – Amenhauser	5 – Meo	Alabama A&M Events Center (297); Huntsville, AL
November 23, 2024*; 6:00 p.m.		vs. Alabama A&M; Alabama A&M MTE	L 70–77	2–4	15 – Amenhauser	12 – Amenhauser	4 – Hines	Alabama A&M Events Center (1,651); Huntsville, AL
November 30, 2024*; 2:00 p.m., ESPN+		USC Upstate	W 73–51	3–4	13 – Tied	8 – Tied	3 – Jones	HTC Center (1,242); Conway, SC
December 4, 2024*; 7:00 p.m., FloHoops		at Campbell	W 58–57	4–4	20 – Amenhauser	8 – Hines	5 – Jones	Pope Convocation Center (1,283); Buies Creek, NC
December 7, 2024*; 7:00 p.m., ESPN+		at Winthrop	L 89–96	4–5	21 – Jones	7 – Jones	4 – Jones	Winthrop Coliseum (1,798); Rock Hill, SC
December 11, 2024*; 7:00 p.m., ESPN+		Southern Virginia	W 82–57	5–5	18 – Battle	6 – Majak	3 – Tied	HTC Center (1,487); Conway, SC
December 17, 2024*; 7:00 p.m., FloHoops		at North Carolina A&T	W 73–68	6–5	20 – Tied	10 – Hines	3 – Meo	Corbett Sports Center (923); Greensboro, NC
December 21, 2024; 3:00 p.m., ESPN+		at Arkansas State	L 67–97	6–6 (0–1)	20 – Battle	10 – Tied	2 – Meo	First National Bank Arena (5,035); Jonesboro, AR
December 29, 2024*; 3:00 p.m., ESPN+		Warner	W 75–53	7–6	20 – Granger	12 – Granger	7 – Meo	HTC Center (1,200); Conway, SC
January 2, 2025; 7:00 p.m., ESPN+		Louisiana	L 68–71	7–7 (0–2)	19 – Jones	5 – Tied	5 – Meo	HTC Center (1,402); Conway, SC
January 4, 2025; 2:00 p.m., ESPN+		Louisiana–Monroe	W 70–51	8–7 (1–2)	13 – Amenhauser	7 – Tied	5 – Jones	HTC Center (1,457); Conway, SC
January 8, 2025; 6:30 p.m., ESPN+		at Appalachian State	L 51–74	8–8 (1–3)	14 – Battle	9 – Hines	2 – Hines	Holmes Center (1,703); Boone, NC
January 11, 2025; 4:00 p.m., ESPN+		at Georgia State	L 74–79	8–9 (1–4)	18 – Jones	11 – Amenhauser	7 – Meo	GSU Convocation Center (1,303); Atlanta, GA
January 16, 2025; 7:00 p.m., ESPN+		Georgia Southern	L 87–88 ^{OT}	8–10 (1–5)	16 – Battle	8 – Battle	3 – Tied	HTC Center (2,492); Conway, SC
January 18, 2025; 3:30 p.m., ESPN+		Marshall	L 64–77	8–11 (1–6)	13 – Tied	9 – Hines	3 – Jones	HTC Center (1,873); Conway, SC
January 23, 2025; 1:00 p.m., ESPN+		at Georgia Southern	L 58–85	8–12 (1–7)	15 – Meo	4 – Tied	3 – Meo	Hill Convocation Center (1,335); Statesboro, GA
January 25, 2025; 7:00 p.m., ESPN+		at Old Dominion	L 52–74	8–13 (1–8)	15 – Battle	11 – Hines	2 – Hines	Chartway Arena (6,684); Norfolk, VA
January 30, 2025; 7:00 p.m., ESPN+		at James Madison	L 64–73	8–14 (1–9)	17 – Tied	9 – Battle	2 – Battle	Atlantic Union Bank Center (4,387); Harrisonburg, VA
February 1, 2025; 4:00 p.m., ESPN+		at Marshall	L 62–67	8–15 (1–10)	17 – Tied	8 – Granger	3 – Battle	Cam Henderson Center (5,105); Huntington, WV
February 5, 2025; 7:00 p.m., ESPN+		South Alabama	L 59–84	8–16 (1–11)	23 – Battle	9 – Amenhauser	7 – Jones	HTC Center (1,598); Conway, SC
February 8, 2025*; 2:00 p.m., ESPN+		at Bowling Green; MAC-SBC Challenge	L 53–67	8–17	13 – Meo	12 – Tied	3 – Tied	Stroh Center (1,648); Bowling Green, OH
February 13, 2025; 7:00 p.m., ESPN+		Appalachian State	L 46–64	8–18 (1–12)	14 – Battle	6 – Granger	4 – Jones	HTC Center (1,925); Conway, SC
February 15, 2025; 2:00 p.m., ESPN+		James Madison	L 73–74	8–19 (1–13)	20 – Meo	7 – Amenhauser	3 – Battle	HTC Center (1,630); Conway, SC
February 20, 2025; 8:00 p.m., ESPN+		at Southern Miss	W 87–78	9–19 (2–13)	29 – Battle	10 – Granger	4 – Meo	Reed Green Coliseum (2,909); Hattiesburg, MS
February 22, 2025; 4:30 p.m., ESPN+		at Troy	L 66–83	9–20 (2–14)	24 – Amenhauser	8 – Amenhauser	3 – Tied	Trojan Arena (4,212); Troy, AL
February 26, 2025; 7:30 p.m., ESPN+		Georgia State	W 80–74	10–20 (3–14)	26 – Amenhauser	10 – Amenhauser	3 – Meo	HTC Center (1,638); Conway, SC
February 28, 2025; 7:30 p.m., ESPN+		Old Dominion	L 59–61	10–21 (3–15)	20 – Battle	10 – Amenhauser	2 – Tied	HTC Center (1,570); Conway, SC
Sun Belt tournament
March 4, 2025; 6:00 p.m., ESPN+	(13)	vs. (12) Southern Miss; First round	L 63–66	10–22	19 – Granger	10 – Amenhauser	4 – Battle	Pensacola Bay Center (723); Pensacola, FL
*Non-conference game. ^{#}Rankings from AP poll. (#) Tournament seedings in parentheses. All times are in Eastern.
