= 2024–25 Old Dominion Monarchs men's basketball team =

American college basketball season

2024–25 Old Dominion Monarchs men's basketball
- Conference: Sun Belt Conference
- Record: 15–20 (8–10 Sun Belt)
- Head coach: Mike Jones (1st season)
- Assistant coaches: Jamal Robinson; Ryan Nadeau; James Robinson
- Home arena: Chartway Arena

2024–25 Sun Belt Conference men's basketball standings
	Conf.				Overall
Team	W		L	PCT	W		L	PCT
South Alabama	13	–	5	.722	21	–	11	.656
James Madison	13	–	5	.722	20	–	12	.625
Troy †	13	–	5	.722	23	–	11	.676
Arkansas State	13	–	5	.722	25	–	11	.694
Marshall	12	–	6	.667	20	–	13	.606
Appalachian State	10	–	8	.556	17	–	14	.548
Texas State	9	–	9	.500	16	–	16	.500
Georgia State	8	–	10	.444	14	–	19	.424
Georgia Southern	8	–	10	.444	17	–	16	.515
Old Dominion	8	–	10	.444	15	–	20	.429
Louisiana	8	–	10	.444	12	–	21	.364
Southern Miss	5	–	13	.278	11	–	22	.333
Coastal Carolina	3	–	15	.167	10	–	22	.313
Louisiana–Monroe	3	–	15	.167	7	–	25	.219
† 2025 Sun Belt tournament winner

The 2024–25 Old Dominion Monarchs men's basketball team represented Old Dominion University during the 2024–25 NCAA Division I men's basketball season. The Monarchs, led by first-year head coach Mike Jones, played their home games at Chartway Arena in Norfolk, Virginia as members of the Sun Belt Conference.

== Previous season ==
The Monarchs finished the 2023–24 season 7–25, 3–15 in Sun Belt play to finish in last place among conference opponents. The Monarchs would lose to Texas State in the first round of the Sun Belt Conference tournament.

== Offseason ==
=== Coaching changes ===
Following the mid-season departure of eleven-year head coach Jeff Jones, former Monarchs player Mike Jones was hired to assume the role of head coach. Jones retained assistant coach Jamal Robinson and hired new assistant coaches Ryan Nadeau and James Robinson for the 2024–25 season.

== Preseason ==
=== Preseason Sun Belt Conference poll ===
Along with Georgia Southern, the Monarchs were picked to finish eighth place in the conference's preseason poll.

Coaches poll
Predicted finish	Team (1st-place votes)
1	Arkansas State – 193 (12)
2	James Madison – 170 (1)
3	Troy – 155 (1)
4	Louisiana – 144
5	Southern Miss – 133
6	App State – 122
7	Texas State – 89
T8	Georgia Southern – 85
T8	Old Dominion – 85
10	Marshall – 79
11	South Alabama – 78
12	Georgia State – 75
13	Coastal Carolina – 34
14	ULM – 28

== Roster ==
2024–25 Old Dominion Monarchs men's basketball team
Players
Coaches

Pos.	#	Name	Height	Weight	Year	Previous school	Hometown
G/F	0	Stephaun Walker	6 ft 7 in (2.01 m)	216 lb (98 kg)	Jr	Robert Morris	Washington, D.C.
G/F	1	Caden Diggs	6 ft 7 in (2.01 m)	197 lb (89 kg)	Fr	Bullis School	Waldorf, Maryland
G	2	Deion Ware	6 ft 4 in (1.93 m)	181 lb (82 kg)	Fr	Academy of Central Florida	New Orleans, Louisiana
G	3	Imo Essien (injured)	5 ft 11 in (1.8 m)	184 lb (83 kg)	Sr	Bishop Lynch High School	Wylie, Texas
G	4	Robert Davis Jr.	6 ft 6 in (1.98 m)	185 lb (84 kg)	So	UMass	Detroit, Michigan
G	6	Sean Durugordon	6 ft 6 in (1.98 m)	216 lb (98 kg)	Jr	Siena	Harlem, New York
G	7	Scottie Hubbard	6 ft 6 in (1.98 m)	224 lb (102 kg)	Fr	Jackson-Reed High School	Washington, D.C.
F	8	Donovan Raymond	6 ft 10 in (2.08 m)	217 lb (98 kg)	So	Hampton	Charlotte, North Carolina
G	10	Jaden Johnson	6 ft 2 in (1.88 m)	206 lb (93 kg)	Fr	Fork Union Military Academy	Waldorf, Maryland
F	11	Dani Pounds	6 ft 7 in (2.01 m)	220 lb (100 kg)	So	Spire Institute	Atlanta, Georgia
G	13	Devin Ceaser	6 ft 1 in (1.85 m)	171 lb (78 kg)	Jr	Buffalo	Waldorf, Maryland
G/F	15	CJ Parker	6 ft 6 in (1.98 m)	182 lb (83 kg)	Fr	Maury High School	Norfolk, Virginia
PG	16	Rieco Hellams	5 ft 8 in (1.73 m)	160 lb (73 kg)	Jr	Our Lady of Good Counsel High School	Washington, D.C.
G	21	Vytautas Zygas	6 ft 6 in (1.98 m)	205 lb (93 kg)	Fr	VDU Rasos Gynamsium	Kaunas, Lithuania
G/F	23	R. J. Blakney	6 ft 6 in (1.98 m)	210 lb (95 kg)	Sr	Dayton	Baltimore, Maryland
G	30	Cooper Jones	6 ft 2 in (1.88 m)	175 lb (79 kg)	So	Walsingham Academy	Lanexa, Virginia
F/C	35	Caelum Swanton-Rodger	7 ft 0 in (2.13 m)	227 lb (103 kg)	Jr	Maryland	Calgary, Alberta
F/C	42	Ben Nacey	6 ft 8 in (2.03 m)	264 lb (120 kg)	Fr	Cox High School	Virginia Beach, Virginia
G	55	Jaylen Jenkins	5 ft 11 in (1.8 m)	157 lb (71 kg)	So	Hampton High School	Hampton, Virginia

Head coach

- Mike Jones (Old Dominion)

Assistant coach(es)

- Jamal Robinson (Virginia)
- Ryan Nadeau (Michigan State)
- James Robinson (Pittsburgh)

Legend

- (C) Team captain
- (S) Suspended
- (I) Ineligible
- (W) Walk-on
- Injured
- Current redshirt

Roster
Last update: October 31, 2024

== Schedule and results ==
On November 4, guard Imo Essien announced he would forgo playing in his senior season due to recurrent health issues.

Date time, TV	Rank^{#}	Opponent^{#}	Result	Record	High points	High rebounds	High assists	Site (attendance) city, state
Regular season
November 4, 2024*; 7:00 p.m., ESPN+		Buffalo; MAC-SBC Challenge	L 82–83	0–1	25 – Davis Jr.	13 – Walker	5 – Johnson	Chartway Arena (5,455); Norfolk, VA
November 9, 2024*; 4:00 p.m., ESPN+		at No. 10 Arizona	L 44–102	0–2	12 – Ceaser	4 – Tied	1 – Tied	McKale Center (13,982); Tucson, AZ
November 12, 2024*; 7:00 p.m., ESPN+		at Radford	L 75–87	0–3	23 – Ceaser	11 – Durugordon	2 – Tied	Dedmon Center (1,731); Radford, VA
November 15, 2024*; 7:00 p.m., ESPN+		Maryland Eastern Shore	W 73–71	1–3	23 – Ceaser	14 – Swanton-Rodger	4 – Davis Jr.	Chartway Arena (5,300); Norfolk, VA
November 19, 2024*; 7:00 p.m., ESPN+		Randolph–Macon	W 71–55	2–3	17 – Durugordon	10 – Durugordon	1 – Tied	Chartway Arena (4,438); Norfolk, VA
November 24, 2024*; 7:30 p.m., FloHoops		vs. Boston College; Cayman Islands Classic quarterfinals	L 52–82	2–4	19 – Davis Jr.	6 – Walker	2 – Davis Jr.	John Gray Gymnasium; George Town, Cayman Islands
November 25, 2024*; 5:00 p.m., FloHoops		vs. High Point; Cayman Islands Classic consolation game	L 67–73	2–5	16 – Durugordon	9 – Durugordon	6 – Johnson	John Gray Gymnasium (915); George Town, Cayman Islands
November 26, 2024*; 11:00 a.m., FloHoops		vs. Duquesne; Cayman Islands Classic 7th place game	L 54–67	2–6	23 – Ceaser	10 – Walker	2 – Tied	John Gray Gymnasium (920); George Town, Cayman Islands
December 2, 2024*; 7:00 p.m., ESPN+		William & Mary; Rivalry	W 88–83	3–6	24 – Durugordon	13 – Walker	8 – Johnson	Chartway Arena (4,563); Norfolk, VA
December 7, 2024; 4:00 p.m., ESPN+		George Washington	L 70–78	3–7	16 – Tied	11 – Tied	7 – Johnson	Chartway Arena (5,109); Norfolk, VA
December 15, 2024*; 1:00 p.m., ESPN+		Northeastern	L 71–75	3–8	17 – Davis Jr.	14 – Walker	8 – Johnson	Chartway Arena (4,050); Norfolk, VA
December 21, 2024; 3:00 p.m., ESPN+		at Louisiana–Monroe	W 80–75 ^{OT}	4–8 (1–0)	32 – Davis Jr.	13 – Blakney	9 – Johnson	Fant–Ewing Coliseum (1,058); Monroe, LA
December 28, 2024*; 4:00 p.m., ESPN+		Virginia Wesleyan	W 82–44	5–8	19 – Davis Jr.	11 – Walker	4 – Tied	Chartway Arena (4,851); Norfolk, VA
January 2, 2025; 7:00 p.m., ESPN+		Arkansas State	L 59–78	5–9 (1–1)	21 – Durugordon	10 – Walker	3 – Durugordon	Chartway Arena (3,918); Norfolk, VA
January 4, 2025; 4:00 p.m., ESPN+		Southern Miss	W 74–71	6–9 (2–1)	18 – Davis Jr.	9 – Durugordon	9 – Johnson	Chartway Arena (5,069); Norfolk, VA
January 9, 2025; 8:00 p.m., ESPN+		at Louisiana	W 71–60	7–9 (3–1)	20 – Durugordon	7 – Durugordon	6 – Johnson	Cajundome (1,235); Lafayette, LA
January 11, 2025; 4:00 p.m., ESPN+		at South Alabama	W 71–63 ^{OT}	8–9 (4–1)	27 – Durugordon	18 – Durugordon	8 – Johnson	Mitchell Center (2,089); Mobile, AL
January 16, 2025; 7:00 p.m., ESPN+		Appalachian State	L 43–62	8–10 (4–2)	11 – Davis Jr.	7 – Tied	1 – Tied	Chartway Arena (4,529); Norfolk, VA
January 18, 2025; 3:30 p.m., ESPN+		Georgia Southern	L 63–67	8–11 (4–3)	20 – Davis Jr.	17 – Durugordon	1 – Tied	Chartway Arena (5,739); Norfolk, VA
January 22, 2025; 7:00 p.m., ESPN+		James Madison; Royal Rivalry	L 60–74	8–12 (4–4)	23 – Davis Jr.	10 – Durugordon	2 – Swanton-Rodger	Chartway Arena (6,008); Norfolk, VA
January 25, 2025; 7:00 p.m., ESPN+		Coastal Carolina	W 74–52	9–12 (5–4)	23 – Davis Jr.	10 – Durugordon	5 – Davis Jr.	Chartway Arena (6,684); Norfolk, VA
January 29, 2025; 6:30 p.m., ESPN+		at Appalachian State	W 78–77	10–12 (6–4)	25 – Durugordon	12 – Durugordon	7 – Johnson	Holmes Center (3,249); Boone, NC
February 1, 2025; 4:00 p.m., ESPN+		at James Madison; Royal Rivalry	L 54–68	10–13 (6–5)	18 – Durugordon	8 – Durugordon	7 – Johnson	Atlantic Union Bank Center (6,192); Harrisonburg, VA
February 5, 2025; 7:00 p.m., ESPN+		Texas State	W 75–64	11–13 (7–5)	20 – Durugordon	13 – Durugordon	3 – Johnson	Chartway Arena (5,474); Norfolk, VA
February 8, 2025*; 2:00 p.m., ESPN+		at Eastern Michigan; MAC-SBC Challenge	L 70–76	11–14	18 – Davis Jr.	12 – Durugordon	2 – Tied	George Gervin GameAbove Center (1,673); Ypsilanti, MI
February 13, 2025; 7:00 p.m., ESPN+		at Georgia State	L 75–97	11–15 (7–6)	21 – Durugordon	7 – Tied	2 – Tied	GSU Convocation Center (1,579); Atlanta, GA
February 15, 2025; 3:00 p.m., ESPN+		at Georgia Southern	L 75–78	11–16 (7–7)	24 – Durugordon	10 – Durugordon	3 – Tied	Hill Convocation Center (2,144); Statesboro, GA
February 20, 2025; 7:00 p.m., ESPN+		Marshall	L 77–81	11–17 (7–8)	19 – Durugordon	6 – Tied	2 – Tied	Chartway Arena (3,839); Norfolk, VA
February 22, 2025; 7:00 p.m., ESPN+		Georgia State	L 70–76	11–18 (7–9)	16 – Durugordon	14 – Durugordon	7 – Johnson	Chartway Arena (6,805); Norfolk, VA
February 25, 2025; 7:00 p.m., ESPN+		at Marshall	L 66–83	11–19 (7–10)	23 – Davis Jr.	6 – Swanton-Rodger	5 – Swanton-Rodger	Cam Henderson Center (5,133); Huntington, WV
February 28, 2025; 7:30 p.m., ESPN+		at Coastal Carolina	W 61–59	12–19 (8–10)	14 – Davis Jr.	12 – Durugordon	3 – Davis Jr.	HTC Center (1,570); Conway, SC
Sun Belt tournament
March 5, 2025; 8:30 p.m., ESPN+	(10)	vs. (11) Louisiana; Second round	W 67–49	13–19	21 – Durugordon	10 – Tied	9 – Johnson	Pensacola Bay Center (838); Pensacola, FL
March 6, 2025; 8:30 p.m., ESPN+	(10)	vs. (7) Texas State; Third round	W 64–61	14–19	23 – Davis Jr.	12 – Durugordon	3 – Tied	Pensacola Bay Center (1,064); Pensacola, FL
March 7, 2025; 8:30 p.m., ESPN+	(10)	vs. (6) Appalachian State; Fourth round	W 61–56	15–19	21 – Durugordon	12 – Durugordon	3 – Johnson	Pensacola Bay Center (1,469); Pensacola, FL
March 8, 2025; 9:00 p.m., ESPN+	(10)	vs. (3) Troy; Quarterfinals	L 59–75	15–20	20 – Blakney	16 – Durugordon	4 – Tied	Pensacola Bay Center (2,669); Pensacola, FL
*Non-conference game. ^{#}Rankings from AP Poll. (#) Tournament seedings in parentheses. All times are in Eastern.
