= 2024–25 Georgia State Panthers men's basketball team =

American college basketball season

2024–25 Georgia State Panthers men's basketball
- Conference: Sun Belt Conference
- Record: 14–19 (8–10 Sun Belt)
- Head coach: Jonas Hayes (3rd season)
- Associate head coach: Danny Peters (3rd season)
- Assistant coaches: Jarvis Hayes (6th season); Allen Payne (3rd season)
- Home arena: GSU Convocation Center

2024–25 Sun Belt Conference men's basketball standings
	Conf.				Overall
Team	W		L	PCT	W		L	PCT
South Alabama	13	–	5	.722	21	–	11	.656
James Madison	13	–	5	.722	20	–	12	.625
Troy †	13	–	5	.722	23	–	11	.676
Arkansas State	13	–	5	.722	25	–	11	.694
Marshall	12	–	6	.667	20	–	13	.606
Appalachian State	10	–	8	.556	17	–	14	.548
Texas State	9	–	9	.500	16	–	16	.500
Georgia State	8	–	10	.444	14	–	19	.424
Georgia Southern	8	–	10	.444	17	–	16	.515
Old Dominion	8	–	10	.444	15	–	20	.429
Louisiana	8	–	10	.444	12	–	21	.364
Southern Miss	5	–	13	.278	11	–	22	.333
Coastal Carolina	3	–	15	.167	10	–	22	.313
Louisiana–Monroe	3	–	15	.167	7	–	25	.219
† 2025 Sun Belt tournament winner

The 2024–25 Georgia State Panthers men's basketball team represented Georgia State University during the 2024–25 NCAA Division I men's basketball season. The Panthers, led by third-year head coach Jonas Hayes, played their home games at the GSU Convocation Center in Atlanta, Georgia as members of the Sun Belt Conference.

== Previous season ==
The Panthers finished the 2023–24 season 14–17, 8–10 in Sun Belt play to finish in a three-way tie for seventh place. They were upset by Marshall in the second round of the Sun Belt tournament.

== Offseason ==
=== Departures ===
Departures
Name	Number	Pos.	Height	Weight	Year	Hometown	Reason for departure
Dwon Odom	1	G	6'2"	182	Junior	Alpharetta, Georgia	Transferred to Tulsa
Jamaine Mann	2	F	6'6"	230	Junior	Hampton, Georgia	Transferred to Gardner–Webb
Julian Mackey	3	G	6'2"	170	Junior	Grayson, Georgia	Transferred to Houston Christian
Rickey Bradley Jr.	4	G	6'2"	185	Sophomore	Milwaukee, Wisconsin	Transferred to VMI
Brenden Tucker	5	G	6'3"	195	Senior	Lawrenceville, Georgia	Graduated
Jay'Den Turner	10	F	6'5"	205	Graduate student	High Point, North Carolina	Exhausted eligibility
Edward Nnamoko	21	C	6'10"	225	Sophomore	Lagos, Nigeria	Transferred to New Mexico State
Leslie Nkereuwem	23	F	6'8"	232	Graduate student	Lawrenceville, Georgia	Exhausted eligibility
Lucas Taylor	31	G	6'5"	200	Junior	Raleigh, North Carolina	Transferred to Syracuse
Matt Davis	—	G	6'7"	195	Junior	Alpharetta, Georgia	Entered the transfer portal

=== Incoming transfers ===
Incoming transfers
Name	Number	Pos.	Height	Weight	Year	Hometown	Previous school
Justin Archer	2	F	6'7"	210	Graduate student	North Brunswick, New Jersey	Radford
Cesare Edwards	4	C	6'10"	235	Senior	Hartsville, South Carolina	Missouri State
Zarique Nutter	7	F	6'7"	210	Senior	Newark, New Jersey	Northern Illinois
Darnell Evans	8	G	6'0"	165	Senior	Amityville, New York	Caldwell
Jelani Hamilton	10	G	6'6"	205	RS Freshman	Marietta, Georgia	Iowa State
Malachi Brown	22	G	6'1"	175	Sophomore	Buford, Georgia	Seton Hall
Nick McMullen	33	F	6'8"	235	Senior	Greensboro, North Carolina	UNC Asheville

=== Recruiting class ===
College recruiting information
Name	Hometown	School	Height	Weight	Commit date
Jason Jackson; G	Sarasota, Florida	Overtime Elite	6 ft 4 in (1.93 m)	185 lb (84 kg)	
Jason Jackson; G	Recruit ratings: Rivals: 247Sports: ESPN: (N/A)				
Clash Peters; F	Long Beach, California	Word of God Christian Academy	6 ft 9 in (2.06 m)	230 lb (100 kg)	
Clash Peters; F	Recruit ratings: Rivals: 247Sports: ESPN: (N/A)				
Trey Scott III; F	Atlanta, Georgia	Mount Vernon Presbyterian School	6 ft 10 in (2.08 m)	225 lb (102 kg)	
Trey Scott III; F	Recruit ratings: Rivals: 247Sports: ESPN: (N/A)				
Kwame Tanic; F	Paris, France	Lycée Français d'Irlande	6 ft 6 in (1.98 m)	186 lb (84 kg)	
Kwame Tanic; F	Recruit ratings: Rivals: 247Sports: ESPN: (N/A)				
Overall recruit ranking:
Note: In many cases, Scout, Rivals, 247Sports, On3, and ESPN may conflict in their listings of height and weight.; In these cases, the average was taken. ESPN grades are on a 100-point scale.; Sources: "2024 Team Ranking". Rivals.

== Preseason ==
=== Preseason Sun Belt Conference poll ===
The Panthers were picked to finish in 12th place in the conference's preseason poll. Senior guard Toneari Lane was named to the preseason All-SBC Second Team. Senior guard Myles Tate was named to the conference preseason third team.

Coaches poll
Predicted finish	Team (1st place Votes)
1	Arkansas State - 193 (12)
2	James Madison - 170 (1)
3	Troy - 155 (1)
4	Louisiana - 144
5	Southern Miss - 133
6	App State - 122
7	Texas State - 89
T8	Georgia Southern - 85
T8	Old Dominion - 85
10	Marshall - 79
11	South Alabama - 78
12	Georgia State - 75
13	Coastal Carolina - 34
14	ULM - 28

== Roster ==
2024–25 Georgia State Panthers men's basketball team
Players
Coaches

Pos.	#	Name	Height	Weight	Year	Previous school	Hometown
G	0	Jason Jackson	6 ft 4 in (1.93 m)	185 lb (84 kg)	Fr	Overtime Elite	Sarasota, Florida
G	1	Malik Ferguson	6 ft 4 in (1.93 m)	190 lb (86 kg)	So	Grovetown High School	Grovetown, Georgia
F	2	Justin Archer	6 ft 7 in (2.01 m)	210 lb (95 kg)	GS	Radford	North Brunswick, New Jersey
C	4	Cesare Edwards	6 ft 10 in (2.08 m)	235 lb (107 kg)	Sr	Missouri State	Hartsville, South Carolina
G	6	Brevyn Coleman	6 ft 2 in (1.88 m)	185 lb (84 kg)	So	St. Edward High School	Lakewood, Ohio
G	7	Zarique Nutter	6 ft 7 in (2.01 m)	210 lb (95 kg)	Sr	Northern Illinois	Newark, New Jersey
G	8	Darnell Evans	6 ft 0 in (1.83 m)	165 lb (75 kg)	Sr	Caldwell	Amityville, New York
G	10	Jelani Hamilton	6 ft 6 in (1.98 m)	205 lb (93 kg)	RS Fr	Iowa State	Marietta, Georgia
G	11	Toneari Lane	6 ft 5 in (1.96 m)	205 lb (93 kg)	Sr	Winthrop	Atlanta, Georgia
F	12	Dhiaukuei "DK" Manyiel Dut	7 ft 0 in (2.13 m)	210 lb (95 kg)	RS Fr	Greenforest Christian Academy	Rumbek, South Sudan
G	14	Aaron Oh	6 ft 0 in (1.83 m)	185 lb (84 kg)	RS So	Mill Creek High School	Buford, Georgia
G	20	Emmanuel Koveos	5 ft 10 in (1.78 m)	160 lb (73 kg)	So	DME Academy	Rhodes, Greece
F	21	Clash Peters	6 ft 9 in (2.06 m)	230 lb (104 kg)	Fr	Word of God Christian Academy	Long Beach, California
G	22	Malachi Brown	6 ft 1 in (1.85 m)	175 lb (79 kg)	So	Seton Hall	Buford, Georgia
F	24	Trey Scott III	6 ft 10 in (2.08 m)	225 lb (102 kg)	Fr	Mount Vernon Presbyterian School	Atlanta, Georgia
F	32	Kwame Tanic	6 ft 6 in (1.98 m)	186 lb (84 kg)	Fr	Lycée Français d'Irlande	Paris, France
F	33	Nick McMullen	6 ft 8 in (2.03 m)	235 lb (107 kg)	Sr	UNC Asheville	Greensboro, North Carolina

Head coach

- Jonas Hayes (Georgia)

Assistant coach(es)

- Danny Peters (Ohio State)
- Jarvis Hayes (Georgia)
- Allen Payne (Auburn)

Legend

- (C) Team captain
- (S) Suspended
- (I) Ineligible
- (W) Walk-on
- Injured
- Current redshirt

Roster
Last update: December 3, 2024

== Schedule and results ==
Date time, TV	Rank^{#}	Opponent^{#}	Result	Record	High points	High rebounds	High assists	Site (attendance) city, state
Exhibition
October 26, 2024*; 2:00 pm		South Carolina–Beaufort	W 100–88	–	23 – Tied	11 – Edwards	5 – Nutter	GSU Convocation Center; Atlanta, GA
Non-conference regular season
November 4, 2024*; 7:00 pm, ESPN+		Ball State; MAC–SBC Challenge	W 71–66	1–0	17 – Edwards	13 – McMullen	6 – Nutter	GSU Convocation Center (532); Atlanta, GA
November 8, 2024*; 7:30 pm, SECN+		at Mississippi State	L 66–101	1–1	15 – Lane	6 – Tied	2 – Tied	Humphrey Coliseum (8,726); Starkville, MS
November 13, 2024*; 7:00 pm, ESPN+		at Jacksonville State	L 67–72	1–2	16 – Tied	14 – McMullen	4 – Brown	Pete Mathews Coliseum (2,654); Jacksonville, AL
November 18, 2024*; 7:00 pm		Toccoa Falls	W 106–66	2–2	32 – Hamilton	13 – Peters	4 – Tied	GSU Convocation Center (349); Atlanta, GA
November 22, 2024*; 7:00 pm, ESPN+		North Carolina Central	W 93–79	3–2	23 – Lane	11 – McMullen	7 – Brown	GSU Convocation Center (540); Atlanta, GA
November 26, 2024*; 2:30 pm, ESPN+		vs. Austin Peay; Jacksonville Classic	L 50–62	3–3	17 – Nutter	12 – McMullen	3 – Tied	FSCJ Gymnasium (148); Jacksonville, FL
November 27, 2024*; 2:30 pm, ESPN+		vs. Tulsa; Jacksonville Classic	W 74–71	4–3	22 – Nutter	16 – Edwards	2 – Tied	FSCJ Gymnasium (203); Jacksonville, FL
November 29, 2024*; 7:00 pm, SECN		at No. 8 Kentucky	L 76–105	4–4	21 – Edwards	7 – McMullen	5 – Brown	Rupp Arena (19,914); Lexington, KY
December 6, 2024*; 7:00 pm, ESPN+		Kennesaw State	L 77–81	4–5	20 – Nutter	12 – McMullen	4 – Tied	GSU Convocation Center (1,642); Atlanta, GA
December 14, 2024*; 2:00 pm, ESPN+		Charlotte	L 63–77	4–6	19 – Nutter	8 – Peters	1 – Tied	GSU Convocation Center (1,490); Atlanta, GA
December 17, 2024*; 8:00 pm, ESPN+		at No. 2 Auburn	L 59–100	4–7	15 – Tied	16 – McMullen	2 – Tied	Neville Arena (9,121); Auburn, AL
Sun Belt regular season
December 21, 2024; 4:33 pm, ESPN+		at Troy	L 57–77	4–8 (0–1)	18 – Hamilton	6 – McMullen	3 – Tied	Trojan Arena (2,672); Troy, AL
December 28, 2024*; 2:00 pm, ESPN+		Mercer	L 68–71	4–9	20 – Edwards	13 – McMullen	4 – Nutter	GSU Convocation Center (1,710); Atlanta, GA
January 2, 2025; 8:00 pm, ESPN+		South Alabama	L 51–77	4–10 (0–2)	15 – Lane	8 – Peters	7 – Brown	GSU Convocation Center (1,472); Atlanta, GA
January 4, 2025; 7:00 pm, ESPN+		Louisiana	W 94–70	5–10 (1–2)	22 – McMullen	14 – McMullen	4 – Tied	GSU Convocation Center (1,508); Atlanta, GA
January 8, 2025; 8:30 pm, ESPN+		Georgia Southern; Modern Day Hate	W 82–78 ^{OT}	6–10 (2–2)	22 – Nutter	11 – Edwards	6 – Hamilton	GSU Convocation Center (1,875); Atlanta, GA
January 11, 2025; 4:00 pm, ESPN+		Coastal Carolina	W 79–74	7–10 (3–2)	23 – Nutter	9 – Edwards	6 – Brown	GSU Convocation Center (1,303); Atlanta, GA
January 15, 2025; 8:00 pm, ESPN+		at Texas State	L 80–94	7–11 (3–3)	29 – Edwards	9 – McMullen	4 – Tied	Strahan Arena (2,292); San Marcos, TX
January 18, 2025; 3:30 pm, ESPN+		at Arkansas State	L 59–85	7–12 (3–4)	15 – Tied	12 – McMullen	3 – Tied	First National Bank Arena (5,617); Jonesboro, AR
January 23, 2025; 7:00 pm, ESPN+		Marshall	L 79–92	7–13 (3–5)	21 – Edwards	12 – McMullen	5 – Brown	GSU Convocation Center (1,557); Atlanta, GA
January 25, 2025; 4:00 pm, ESPN+		James Madison	L 79–86	7–14 (3–6)	20 – Edwards	9 – McMullen	9 – Brown	GSU Convocation Center (1,792); Atlanta, GA
January 30, 2025; 4:00 pm, ESPN+		at Marshall	W 85–81	8–14 (4–6)	27 – Edwards	8 – McMullen	6 – Hamilton	Cam Henderson Center (4,402); Huntington, WV
February 1, 2025; 1:00 pm, ESPN+		at Appalachian State	L 76–80	8–15 (4–7)	24 – Edwards	7 – McMullen	3 – Tied	Holmes Center (3,498); Boone, NC
February 5, 2025; 7:00 pm, ESPN+		Louisiana–Monroe	W 97–64	9–15 (5–7)	22 – Lane	9 – Tied	5 – Brown	GSU Convocation Center (1,441); Atlanta, GA
February 8, 2025*; 2:00 p.m., ESPN+		at Buffalo; MAC–SBC Challenge	W 80–75	10–15	16 – Brown	10 – Tied	6 – Brown	Alumni Arena (1,395); Amherst, NY
February 13, 2025; 7:00 pm, ESPN+		at Old Dominion	W 97–75	11–15 (6–7)	29 – Edwards	11 – Edwards	7 – Brown	GSU Convocation Center (1,579); Atlanta, GA
February 15, 2025; 2:00 pm, ESPN+		Appalachian State	W 70–65	12–15 (7–7)	24 – Edwards	9 – Edwards	2 – Nutter	GSU Convocation Center (1,720); Atlanta, GA
February 20, 2025; 7:00 pm, ESPN+		at James Madison	L 63–83	12–16 (7–8)	14 – Edwards	13 – McMullen	1 – Tied	Atlantic Union Bank Center (4,101); Harrisonburg, VA
February 22, 2025; 7:00 pm, ESPN+		at Old Dominion	W 76–70	13–16 (8–8)	24 – Hamilton	10 – McMullen	5 – Hamilton	Chartway Arena (6,805); Norfolk, VA
February 26, 2025; 7:30 pm, ESPN+		at Coastal Carolina	L 74–80	13–17 (8–9)	25 – Hamilton	7 – Tied	3 – Nutter	HTC Center (1,638); Conway, SC
February 28, 2025; 8:00 pm, ESPN+		Georgia Southern; Modern Day Hate	L 75–76	13–18 (8–10)	21 – Edwards	9 – McMullen	4 – Brown	Hill Convocation Center (3,484); Statesboro, GA
Sun Belt tournament
March 6, 2025; 6:00 pm, ESPN+	(8)	vs. (9) Georgia Southern; Third round	W 80–71	14–18	22 – Lane	13 – Edwards	3 – Nutter	Pensacola Bay Center (919); Pensacola, FL
March 7, 2025; 6:00 pm, ESPN+	(8)	vs. (5) Marshall; Fourth round	L 76–79	14–19	28 – Hamilton	9 – edwards	3 – Brown	Pensacola Bay Center (1,201); Pensacola, FL
*Non-conference game. ^{#}Rankings from AP Poll. (#) Tournament seedings in parentheses. All times are in Eastern.
