= 2025 NCAA Men's Basketball All-Americans =

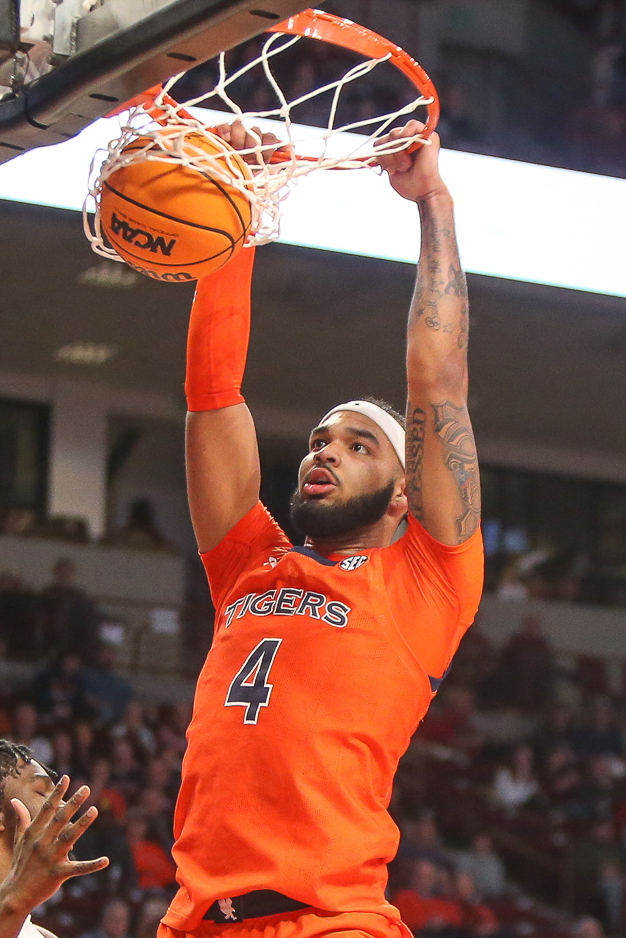
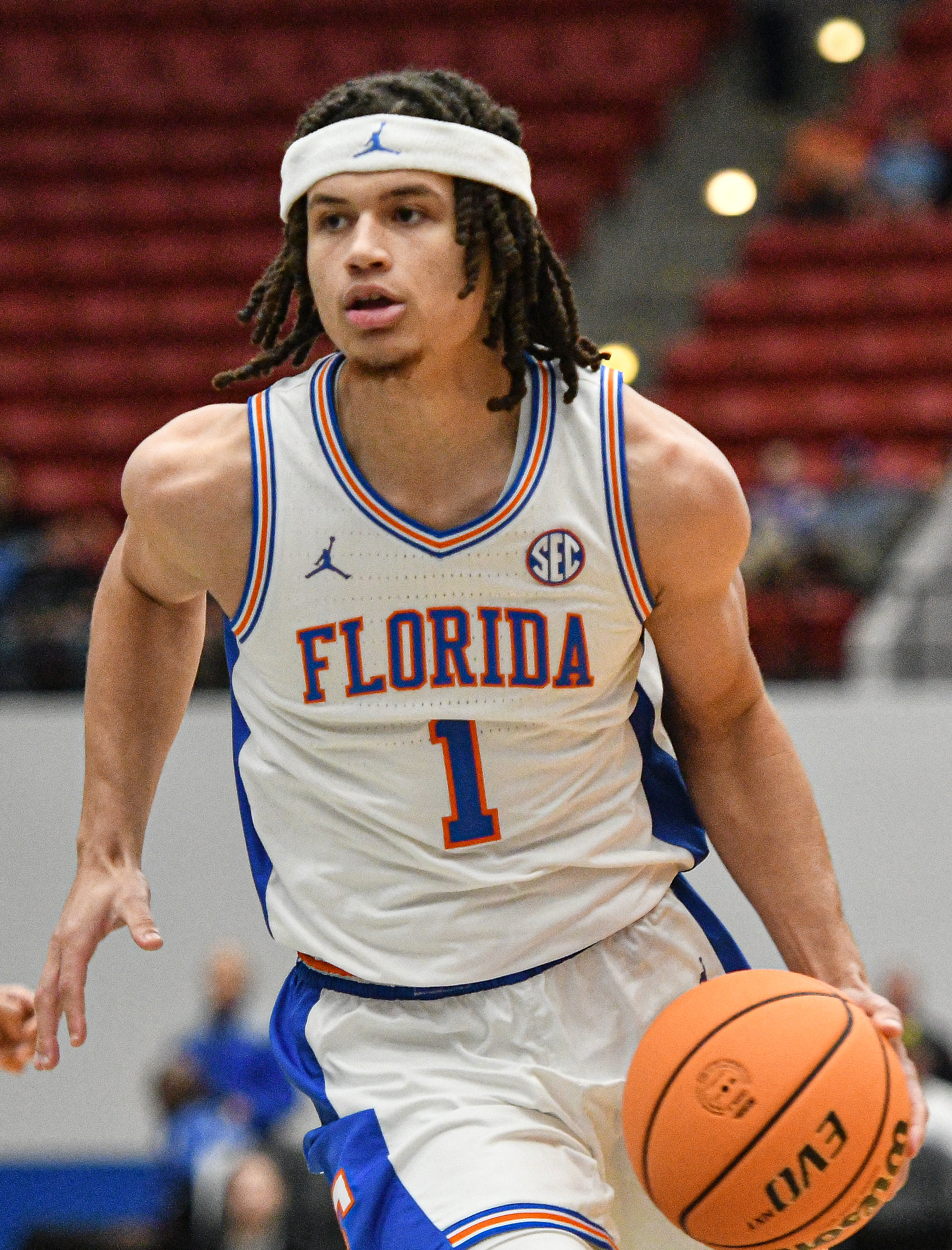
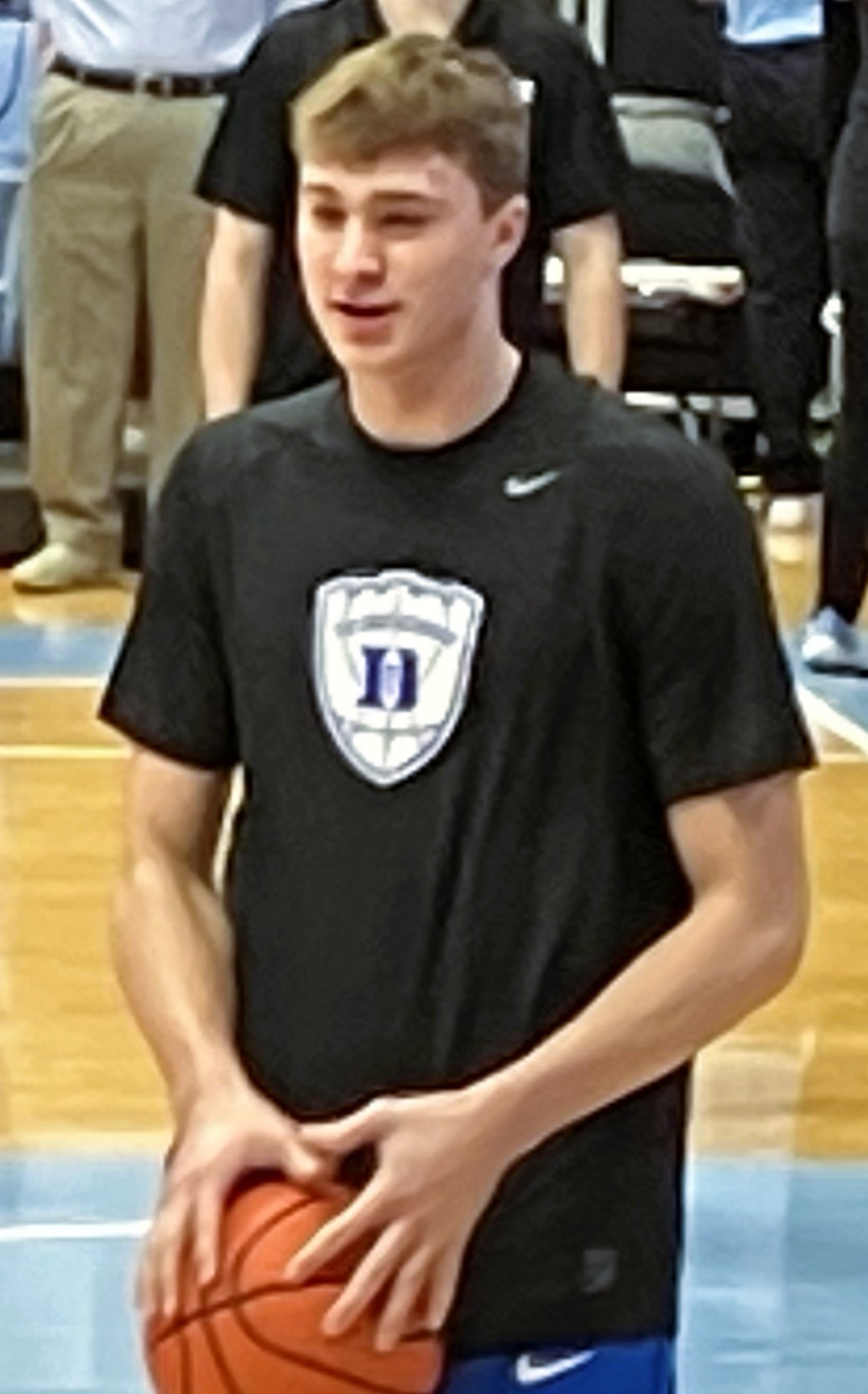
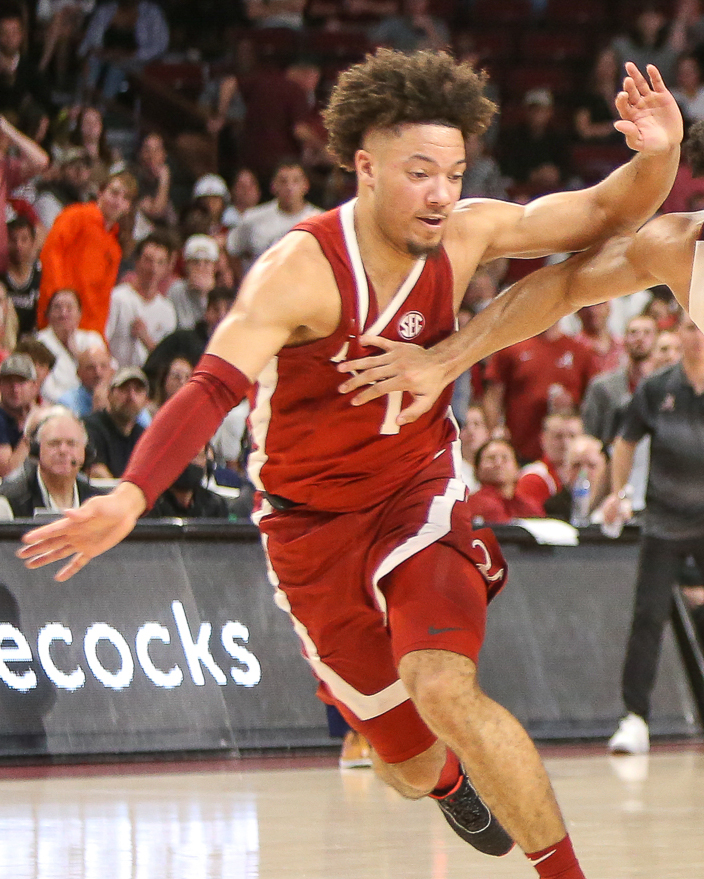
- Members of the 2025 Consensus All-America first team. Clockwise from upper left: Broome, Clayton, Sears, Flagg; (not pictured: Smith).
- Awarded for: 2024–25 NCAA Division I men's basketball season

An All-American team is an honorary sports team composed of the best amateur players of a specific season for each team position—who in turn are given the honorific "All-America" and typically referred to as "All-American athletes", or simply "All-Americans". Although the honorees generally do not compete together as a unit, the term is used in U.S. team sports to refer to players who are selected by members of the national media. Walter Camp selected the first All-America team in the early days of American football in 1889. The 2025 NCAA Men's Basketball All-Americans are honorary lists that include All-American selections from the Associated Press (AP), the United States Basketball Writers Association (USBWA), The Sporting News (TSN), and the National Association of Basketball Coaches (NABC) for the 2024–25 NCAA Division I men's basketball season. All selectors choose three teams, while AP and USBWA also list honorable mention selections.

The Consensus 2025 College Basketball All-American team will be determined by aggregating the results of the four major All-American teams as determined by the National Collegiate Athletic Association (NCAA). Since United Press International was replaced by TSN in 1997, the four major selectors have been the aforementioned ones. AP has been a selector since 1948, NABC since 1957 and USBWA since 1960. To earn "consensus" status, a player must win honors based on a point system computed from the four different all-America teams. The point system consists of three points for first team, two points for second team and one point for third team. No honorable mention or fourth team or lower are used in the computation. The top five totals plus ties are first team and the next five plus ties are second team.

== 2025 Consensus All-America team ==
PG – Point guard
SG – Shooting guard
PF – Power forward
SF – Small forward
C – Center

Consensus First Team
Player	Position	Class	Team
Johni Broome	PF/C	Graduate	Auburn
Walter Clayton Jr.	PG/SG	Senior	Florida
Cooper Flagg	SF	Freshman	Duke
Mark Sears	PG	Graduate	Alabama
Braden Smith	PG	Junior	Purdue

Consensus Second Team
Player	Position	Class	Team
PJ Haggerty	SG	Sophomore	Memphis
Kam Jones	PG/SG	Senior	Marquette
RJ Luis Jr.	SF	Junior	St. John's
John Tonje	SG	Graduate	Wisconsin
JT Toppin	PF	Sophomore	Texas Tech

== Individual All-America teams ==
=== By player ===
Player	School	AP	USBWA	NABC	SN	CP	Notes
Johni Broome	Auburn	1	1	1	1	12	The Sporting News Player of the Year, Pete Newell Big Man Award, Karl Malone Award, SEC Player of the Year
Walter Clayton Jr.	Florida	1	1	1	1	12	NCAA Final Four Most Outstanding Player
Cooper Flagg	Duke	1	1	1	1	12	John R. Wooden Award, Naismith Player of the Year, AP Player of the Year, NABC Player of the Year, Oscar Robertson Trophy, Lute Olson Award, Julius Erving Award, USBWA National Freshman of the Year, NABC Freshman of the Year, ACC Player of the Year
Mark Sears	Alabama	1	1	1	1	12	
Braden Smith	Purdue	1	1	1	1	12	Bob Cousy Award, Big Ten Player of the Year
Kam Jones	Marquette	2	2	2	2	8	
JT Toppin	Texas Tech	2	2	2	2	8	Big 12 Player of the Year
PJ Haggerty	Memphis	2	2	3	2	7	AAC Player of the Year
RJ Luis Jr.	St. John's	2	2	2	3	7	Big East Player of the Year, Academic All-American of the Year
John Tonje	Wisconsin	2	3	2	2	7	
Ryan Kalkbrenner	Creighton	3	2	2	3	6	Naismith Defensive Player of the Year, NABC Defensive Player of the Year, Kareem Abdul-Jabbar Award
Eric Dixon	Villanova	3	3	3	2	5	Philadelphia Big 5 Player of the Year, NCAA scoring champion
LJ Cryer	Houston	3	3	3	3	4	
Zakai Zeigler	Tennessee	3	3	3	3	4	
Hunter Dickinson	Kansas	3	3			2	
Chaz Lanier	Tennessee			3	3	2	Jerry West Award

=== By team ===
All-America Team
All-America Team	First team		Second team		Third team	
All-America Team	Player	School	Player	School	Player	School
Associated Press	Johni Broome	Auburn	PJ Haggerty	Memphis	LJ Cryer	Houston
Associated Press	Walter Clayton Jr.	Florida	Kam Jones	Marquette	Hunter Dickinson	Kansas
Associated Press	Cooper Flagg	Duke	RJ Luis Jr.	St. John's	Eric Dixon	Villanova
Associated Press	Mark Sears	Alabama	John Tonje	Wisconsin	Ryan Kalkbrenner	Creighton
Associated Press	Braden Smith	Purdue	JT Toppin	Texas Tech	Zakai Zeigler	Tennessee
USBWA	Johni Broome	Auburn	PJ Haggerty	Memphis	LJ Cryer	Houston
USBWA	Walter Clayton Jr.	Florida	Kam Jones	Marquette	Hunter Dickinson	Kansas
USBWA	Cooper Flagg	Duke	Ryan Kalkbrenner	Creighton	Eric Dixon	Villanova
USBWA	Mark Sears	Alabama	RJ Luis Jr.	St. John's	John Tonje	Wisconsin
USBWA	Braden Smith	Purdue	JT Toppin	Texas Tech	Zakai Zeigler	Tennessee
NABC	Johni Broome	Auburn	Kam Jones	Marquette	LJ Cryer	Houston
NABC	Walter Clayton Jr.	Florida	Ryan Kalkbrenner	Creighton	Eric Dixon	Villanova
NABC	Cooper Flagg	Duke	RJ Luis Jr.	St. John's	PJ Haggerty	Memphis
NABC	Mark Sears	Alabama	John Tonje	Wisconsin	Chaz Lanier	Tennessee
NABC	Braden Smith	Purdue	JT Toppin	Texas Tech	Zakai Zeigler	Tennessee
The Sporting News
The Sporting News	Johni Broome	Auburn	Eric Dixon	Villanova	LJ Cryer	Houston
The Sporting News	Walter Clayton Jr.	Florida	PJ Haggerty	Memphis	Ryan Kalkbrenner	Creighton
The Sporting News	Cooper Flagg	Duke	Kam Jones	Marquette	Chaz Lanier	Tennessee
The Sporting News	Mark Sears	Alabama	John Tonje	Wisconsin	RJ Luis Jr.	St. John's
The Sporting News	Braden Smith	Purdue	JT Toppin	Texas Tech	Zakai Zeigler	Tennessee

AP Honorable Mention:

- Nique Clifford, Colorado State
- Donovan Dent, New Mexico
- Dylan Harper, Rutgers
- Chucky Hepburn, Louisville
- Tre Johnson, Texas
- Curtis Jones, Iowa State
- Trey Kaufman-Renn, Purdue
- Chaz Lanier, Tennessee
- Derik Queen, Maryland
- Maxime Raynaud, Stanford
- Javon Small, West Virginia
- Bennett Stirtz, Drake

USBWA Honorable Mention:

- Donovan Dent, New Mexico
- Bennett Stirtz, Drake

== Academic All-Americans ==
College Sports Communicators announced its 2025 Academic All-America teams for all NCAA divisions and the NAIA on April 15, 2025. The Division I Academic All-American of the Year is indicated in bold.

First Team
Player	School	Class	GPA and major
Steven Ashworth	Creighton	Senior	3.57, leadership
Tamin Lipsey	Iowa State	Junior	3.69, communication studies
**RJ Luis Jr.**	St. John's	Junior	3.86, sports management
Nick Martinelli	Northwestern	Junior	3.82, communication studies
Stevie Mitchell	Marquette	Senior	3.97, finance and information systems

Second Team
Player	School	Class	GPA and major
Jaden Akins	Michigan State	Senior	3.58 (UG)/3.50 (G), strategic communications
Tytan Anderson	Northern Iowa	Senior	3.84, business administration
Tyson Degenhart	Boise State	Senior	3.92, finance
Zuby Ejiofor	St. John's	Junior	3.82, sports management
Sion James	Duke	Graduate	3.78 (UG)/3.76 (G), continuing studies
Gibson Jimerson	Saint Louis	Graduate	3.93 (UG)/3.82 (G), organizational development
Michael Rataj	Oregon State	Junior	3.99, biohealth sciences
Blaise Threatt	Weber State	Senior	4.00, professional sales

Third Team
Player	School	Class	GPA and major
Masen Miller	North Dakota State	Graduate	3.93 (UG), finance; 4.00 (G), business administration
Payton Sandfort	Iowa	Senior	3.81, finance
