= Zakai Zeigler =

American basketball player (born 2002)

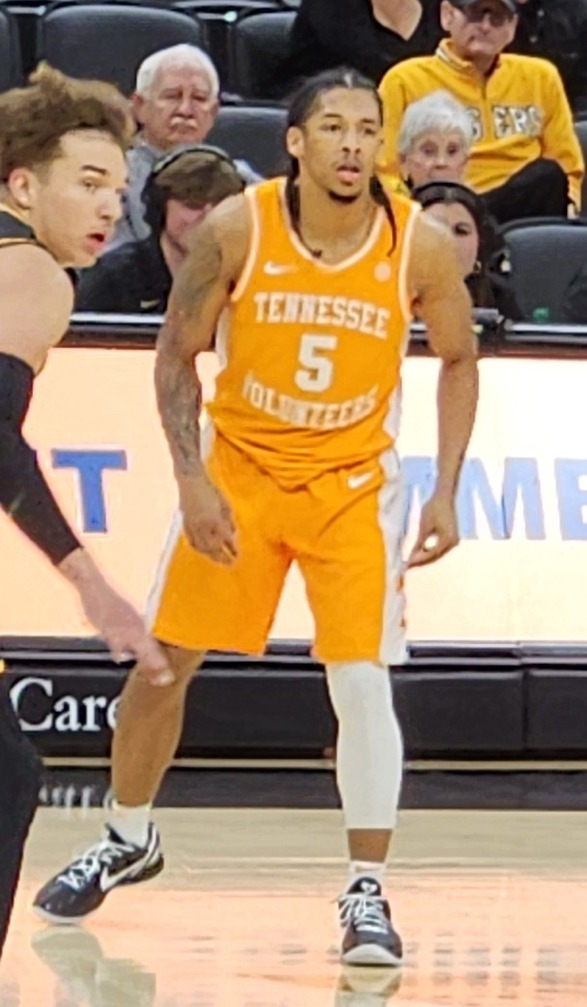
- Zeigler with Tennessee in 2024

No. 5 – Hamburg Towers
- Position: Point guard
- League: Basketball Bundesliga

Personal information
- Born: August 2, 2002 (age 24) Long Island, New York, U.S.
- Listed height: 5 ft 9 in (1.75 m)
- Listed weight: 171 lb (78 kg)

Career information
- High school: Our Saviour Lutheran School (The Bronx, New York)
- College: Tennessee (2021–2025)
- NBA draft: 2025: undrafted
- Playing career: 2025–present

Career history
- 2025–2026: Nanterre 92
- 2026–present: Hamburg Towers

Career highlights
- Third-team All-American – AP, USBWA, NABC, SN (2025); 2× SEC Defensive Player of the Year (2024, 2025); 2× First-team All-SEC (2024, 2025); Second-team All-SEC (2023); 4× SEC All-Defensive Team (2022–2025); SEC All-Freshman Team (2022)

Zakai Za’Miek Zeigler (born August 2, 2002) is an American professional basketball player for the Hamburg Towers of the German Basketball Bundesliga (BBL). He played college basketball for the Tennessee Volunteers.

== High school career ==
Zeigler graduated from Our Saviour Lutheran School in The Bronx, New York, after transferring from Immaculate Conception High School in Montclair, New Jersey. With Immaculate Conception, Zeigler averaged 20.3 points and 4.6 assists per game. A three-star recruit, he committed to play college basketball at the University of Tennessee over offers from Minnesota, Boston College, and Wichita State.

== College career ==
In his freshman season, Zeigler made an immediate impact. He finished the season averaging 8.8 points per game while shooting 35% from three. The following season, Zeigler averaged 10.7 points and 5.4 assists per game before his season prematurely ended after he tore his anterior cruciate ligament in a game against Arkansas. Zeigler returned to action the next season with limited playing time. His role increased throughout the season as he recovered, eventually being named the SEC Defensive Player of the Year at the season's end. He averaged 11.8 points, 6.1 assists, 2.8 rebounds and 1.7 steals per game.

== Professional career ==
On July 23, 2025, he signed with Nanterre 92 of the LNB Pro A. On July 28, 2026, Zeigler signed with Hamburg Towers of the German Basketball Bundesliga.

== Career statistics ==
Legend
GP	Games played	GS	Games started	MPG	Minutes per game
FG%	Field goal percentage	3P%	3-point field goal percentage	FT%	Free throw percentage
RPG	Rebounds per game	APG	Assists per game	SPG	Steals per game
BPG	Blocks per game	PPG	Points per game	**Bold**	Career high

=== College ===
Year	Team	GP	GS	MPG	FG%	3P%	FT%	RPG	APG	SPG	BPG	PPG
2021–22	Tennessee	35	1	22.1	.381	.352	.843	1.9	2.7	1.7	0.1	8.8
2022–23	Tennessee	30	15	28.8	.375	.311	.833	2.7	5.4	2.0	0.2	10.7
2023–24	Tennessee	36	30	31.6	.393	.344	.706	2.8	6.1	1.7	0.1	11.8
2024–25	Tennessee	37	37	34.3	.404	.322	.814	2.9	7.4	1.9	0.2	13.6
Career		138	83	29.3	.390	.331	.794	2.6	5.4	1.8	0.2	11.3

== Personal life ==
Zeigler's half-brother, Armoni, plays for the Saint Peter's Peacocks men's basketball team.
