= 2024–25 NCAA Division I men's basketball season =

Basketball season

- Preseason AP No. 1: Kansas Jayhawks
- Regular season: November 4, 2024 − March 16, 2025
- NCAA Tournament: 2025
- Tournament dates: March 18 – April 7, 2025
- National Championship: Alamodome; San Antonio, Texas
- NCAA Champions: Florida Gators
- Other champions: Chattanooga Mocs (NIT), Illinois State Redbirds (CBI); Nebraska Cornhuskers (CBC)
- Player of the Year (Naismith, Wooden): Cooper Flagg, Duke Blue Devils

The 2024–25 NCAA Division I men's basketball season began on November 4, 2024. The regular season ended on March 16, 2025, with the 2025 NCAA Division I men's basketball tournament that began with the First Four on March 18 and ended with the championship game at the Alamodome in San Antonio, Texas, on April 7.

== Rule changes ==
On May 2, 2024, the NCAA Basketball Rules Committee proposed a few rule changes for the 2024–25 season. These changes were approved on June 6 by the Playing Rules Oversight Panel.

- Officials will be able to review whether a player's foot last touching the court was inbounds on a made shot before time expired. If a player's foot is determined to be out of bounds, officials would put the exact time of the violation on the game clock. However, if the shot is made and time remains on the game clock, a video review would not occur.
- A one-game suspension has been added to the ejection of any player, coach, or bench personnel who "disrespectfully contacts an official or makes a threat of physical intimidation or harm, to include pushing, shoving, spitting or attempting to make physical contact with an official".
- An experimental rule for the 2025 NIT will allow a coach to appeal out-of-bounds calls for video replay review in the last two minutes of games, pending NIT board approval.

== Season headlines ==
- April 10, 2024 – Longtime head coach John Calipari left Kentucky after 15 years and was named the head coach at Arkansas.
- May 29 – Stephen F. Austin announced it would leave the Western Athletic Conference on July 1 to rejoin the Southland Conference after a three-year absence.
- July 1 – IUPUI's athletic teams renamed to Indiana University Indianapolis (IU Indy) after the Indiana and Purdue university systems split the university into IU Indianapolis and Purdue University in Indianapolis.
- September 12 – The Pac-12 Conference, which had been reduced to two members after its remaining ten schools left for other power conferences, began a rebuilding process by announcing that Mountain West Conference members Boise State, Colorado State, Fresno State and San Diego State would join the Pac-12 in 2026–27.
- September 24 – The Pac-12 Conference's rebuilding continued as Utah State would join the other Mountain West defectors in 2026–27.
- September 30 – Gonzaga announced it would leave the West Coast Conference to join the Pac-12 Conference for all sports except for football in 2026–27.
- October 1 – UTEP announced it would join the Mountain West Conference from Conference USA in 2026–27.
- October 9:
  - The NCAA Division I Council approved a proposal that reduced the duration of the transfer portal to 30 days. Going forward, the window opens on the day after the completion of the second round of the Division I men's tournament.
  - The council also abolished the National Letter of Intent (NLI) program effective immediately. Written offers of athletics aid replaced the NLI.
  - The council introduced a proposal that would shorten the transition periods for schools wishing to reclassify from Division II or Division III to Division I. If approved at the council's January 2025 meeting, the transition periods for D-II and D-III schools would drop by a year, respectively, to three and four years.
- October 15 – The Mountain West Conference announced that Hawaiʻi, which has been a football-only member of that conference since 2012, would leave the Big West Conference in 2026 to become a full MW member.
- October 21 – The Associated Press released its preseason All-America team. Alabama guard Mark Sears was the leading vote-getter (54 of 55 possible votes), joined by guard R. J. Davis of North Carolina (51 votes), center Hunter Dickinson of Kansas (42), center Johni Broome of Auburn (34), freshman forward Cooper Flagg of Duke (24), and guard Caleb Love of Arizona (24). A tie in voting between Flagg and Love created a sixth spot on the preseason team.
- October 24 – South Florida head coach Amir Abdur-Rahim died unexpectedly at the age of 43.
- November 1 – The Mountain West Conference announced that Grand Canyon would join the conference no later than 2026 for all sports except for football. Grand Canyon's official announcement stated that it would not compete in the West Coast Conference, which it had previously been scheduled to join in July 2025, and that if MW bylaws allowed, it would join that conference in 2025. GCU would ultimately join the MW in July 2025.
- November 7 – The Texas A&M University System Board of Regents approved the name change of the former Texas A&M University–Commerce to East Texas A&M University.
- December 10 – The Mountain West Conference announced that UC Davis would leave the Big West alongside Hawaiʻi to join in 2026 for all sports except for football, where they will remain in the Big Sky Conference as an affiliate.
- January 15, 2025:
  - The Division I Council adopted new criteria for divisional reclassification. Schools moving from Division II or III must meet objective measures of academic success and athletic financial aid. Reclassification periods are now three years for moves from Division II and four years for moves from Division III, contingent on schools meeting these new criteria. Schools already in the reclassification process could opt for the new schedule.
  - The Division I Men's Basketball Oversight Committee approved a proposal that, starting in 2025–26, allows teams to play up to two preseason exhibitions against any four-year institution, including other D-I members. The host institution would also have full control over allocation of proceeds from the games. Through 2024–25, D-I teams had to go through a waiver process to schedule exhibitions against other D-I teams, and had to donate proceeds to a charity. The new rule also eliminated requirements that preseason practice scrimmages be conducted in private and without official scoring.
- February 27 – The Horizon League announced that Northern Illinois would join the conference in 2026–27, coinciding with the football team's departure from the Mid-American Conference to the MW.
- March 19 – The Big West Conference announced that California Baptist would join the conference in 2026–27.
- March 25 – Saint Francis announced that it would reclassify to NCAA Division III starting in 2026–27, when it will leave the Northeast Conference for the Presidents' Athletic Conference.

=== Milestones and records ===
- During the season, the following players reached the 2,000-career-point milestone: Grand Canyon guard Rayshon Harrison, Temple guard Jamal Mashburn Jr., Saint Louis guard Gibson Jimerson, Baylor forward Norchad Omier, Arizona forward Trey Townsend, Villanova forward Eric Dixon, Saint Joseph's guard Erik Reynolds II, Creighton center Ryan Kalkbrenner, Florida guard Walter Clayton Jr., Butler guard Jahmyl Telfort, North Texas guard Atin Wright, Kansas guard Zeke Mayo, LSU guard Jordan Sears, Oral Roberts guard Issac McBride, Tulsa guard Keaston Willis, Texas A&M guard Wade Taylor IV, Minnesota forward Dawson Garcia, Eastern Kentucky forward Devontae Blanton, Marquette guard Kam Jones, Boise State forward Tyson Degenhart, Florida guard Alijah Martin and Alabama guard Chris Youngblood.
- November 12 – Bill Self became Kansas' all-time leader in wins after recording a 77–69 win over Michigan State in Atlanta. The win was his 591st with the Jayhawks, surpassing Phog Allen as the winngest coach in program history. On November 20, he won his 800th career game in an 84–66 home win over UNC Wilmington. Prior to Kansas, Self coached at Oral Roberts, Tulsa and Illinois.
- November 13 – Creighton coach Greg McDermott defeated Houston Christian 78–43 to became the school's all-time leader in wins with 328.
- November 18 – Kansas City defeated local NCCAA member Calvary 119–19, setting several school records, including most lopsided win and fewest points allowed. With the Roos having defeated another local NCCAA school, Kansas Christian, 124–36 on November 8, they became the first Division I men's team with two wins by 85 or more points in a single season.
- December 18 – Following a narrow 62–61 win at home against Davidson, Temple became the sixth college basketball program in history to earn 2,000 all-time wins, joining Kansas, Kentucky, North Carolina, Duke and UCLA.
- January 7 – Following a 62–55 win at home against Georgia Tech, Syracuse became the seventh college program in history to earn 2,000 all-time wins.
- January 11 – Kansas basketball coach Bill Self won his 600th career game after a 54–40 defeat of Cincinnati. Auburn head coach Bruce Pearl became the school's leader in all time wins with 228 after a 66–63 defeat of South Carolina.
- January 22 – Arizona basketball coach Tommy Lloyd won his 100th career game becoming the tenth-fastest coach to do so in a Power Conference after his 126th game.
- February 15 – Michigan State basketball coach Tom Izzo surpassed Bob Knight to become the winningest coach in conference games in Big Ten history with 354, following a 79–65 win on the road over Illinois.
- February 23 – Oakland basketball coach Greg Kampe surpassed Perry Watson to become the winningest coach in conference games in Horizon history with 132, following a 91–86 win on the road over Cleveland State.

== Conference membership changes ==
A total of 23 schools joined new conferences for the 2024–25 season. Of these, 20 moved within Division I, two began reclassification from NCAA Division II, and Chicago State ended its two-year stint as an all-sports independent to join the Northeast Conference.

School	Former conference	New conference
Arizona	Pac-12	Big 12
Arizona State	Pac-12	Big 12
California	Pac-12	ACC
Chicago State	Independent	NEC
Colorado	Pac-12	Big 12
Kennesaw State	ASUN	CUSA
Mercyhurst	PSAC (D–II)	NEC
Merrimack	NEC	MAAC
Oklahoma	Big 12	SEC
Oregon	Pac-12	Big Ten
Oregon State	Pac-12	WCC
Sacred Heart	NEC	MAAC
SMU	AAC	ACC
Stanford	Pac-12	ACC
Stephen F. Austin	WAC	Southland
Texas	Big 12	SEC
UCLA	Pac-12	Big Ten
USC	Pac-12	Big Ten
Utah	Pac-12	Big 12
UTRGV	WAC	Southland
Washington	Pac-12	Big Ten
Washington State	Pac-12	WCC
West Georgia	Gulf South (D–II)	ASUN

The 2024–25 season was the last for five Division I schools and one Division II school in their respective conferences.

School	2024–25 conference	Future conference
Delaware	CAA	CUSA
Grand Canyon	WAC	MW
Missouri State	Missouri Valley	CUSA
New Haven	NE-10 (D–II)	NEC
Seattle	WAC	WCC
UMass	A-10	MAC

== Arenas ==
=== New arenas ===
- Georgia Southern left the Hanner Fieldhouse, after 55 seasons, for the new Jack and Ruth Ann Hill Convocation Center. The team played its first game in the Hill Convocation Center on December 7, 2024 against North Florida, despite playing their first three home games at the Hanner Fieldhouse.
- St. Thomas played their final season at Schoenecker Arena, where they have played since 1981, before moving to the new Lee and Penny Anderson Arena, which will open in the 2025–26 season.
- Tarleton State played their final season at Wisdom Gym, where they have played since 1970, before moving to the new EECU Center, which will open in the 2025–26 season.
- Vermont was originally slated to open their new arena, Tarrant Event Center, as a replacement for the current arena, Patrick Gym. Construction was to continue in 2021 but it has been delayed indefinitely.

=== Arenas of new D-I teams ===
- West Georgia began a transition from Division II to Division I, playing at its home since 2000, The Coliseum on the school's Carrollton, Georgia campus. The Wolves will be ineligible for NCAA-organized postseason play until 2028.
- Mercyhurst also started a transition from Division II to Division I, playing at its home since 1977, Mercyhurst Athletic Center on the school's Erie, Pennsylvania campus. The Lakers will also be ineligible for NCAA-organized postseason play until 2028.

=== Arena name changes ===
- September 2024:
  - The name of PNC Arena, the home arena of NC State, was changed to the Lenovo Center.
  - Tom Gola Arena, the home arena of La Salle, was renamed to John Glaser Arena after renovations were completed.
- October 2024:
  - The Greensboro Coliseum, home arena to UNC Greensboro, was renamed to First Horizon Coliseum.
  - Southern Indiana's Screaming Eagles Arena was renamed to Liberty Arena, Home of the Screaming Eagles following a sponsorship deal with locally based Liberty Federal Credit Union. The renamed arena is not to be confused with Liberty Arena at Liberty University.

=== Other arena changes ===
- Bellarmine announced on August 28, 2024 that home games would return to campus at Knights Hall for the first time since 2019–20. The Knights had played in the interim at Freedom Hall on the grounds of the Kentucky Exposition Center.

== Seasonal outlook ==
The Top 25 from the AP and USA Today Coaching polls

=== Pre-season polls ===
AP
Ranking	Team
1	Kansas (30)
2	Alabama (14)
3	UConn (11)
4	Houston (4)
5	Iowa State
6	Gonzaga (1)
7	Duke
8	Baylor
9	North Carolina
10	Arizona
11	Auburn
12	Tennessee
13	Texas A&M
14	Purdue
15	Creighton
16	Arkansas
17	Indiana
18	Marquette
19	Texas
20	Cincinnati
21	Florida
22	UCLA
23	Kentucky
24	Ole Miss
25	Rutgers

USA Today Coaches
Ranking	Team
1	Kansas (15)
2	Alabama (6)
3	UConn (6)
4	Houston (4)
5	Duke
6	Iowa State
7	Gonzaga
8	Baylor
9	Arizona
10	North Carolina
11	Auburn
12	Tennessee
13	Purdue
14	Creighton
15	Texas A&M
16	Arkansas
17	Marquette
18	Indiana
19	Texas
20	Cincinnati
21	Florida
22	UCLA
23	Kentucky
24	Illinois
25	Ole Miss

=== Final polls ===
AP
Ranking	Team
1	Florida (61)
2	Houston
3	Duke
4	Auburn
5	Tennessee
6	Alabama
7	Michigan State
8	Texas Tech
9	Maryland
10	Michigan
11	St. John's
12	Kentucky
13	BYU
14	Purdue
15	Arizona
16	Wisconsin
17	Iowa State
18	Ole Miss
19	Texas A&M
20	Arkansas
21	Louisville
22	Clemson
23	Gonzaga
24	Saint Mary's
25	Memphis

USA Today Coaches
Ranking	Team
1	Florida (31)
2	Houston
3	Duke
4	Auburn
5	Tennessee
6	Alabama
7	Michigan State
8	Texas Tech
9	Maryland
10	St. John's
11	Michigan
12	Purdue
13	Arizona
14	Kentucky
15	BYU
16	Wisconsin
17	Iowa State
18	Ole Miss
19	Texas A&M
20	Gonzaga
21	Louisville
22	Saint Mary's
23	Clemson
24	Creighton
25	Arkansas

== Top 10 matchups ==
Rankings reflect the AP poll Top 25.

=== Regular season ===
- Nov. 4, 2024
  - No. 6 Gonzaga defeated No. 8 Baylor, 101–63 (Spokane Arena, Spokane, WA)
- Nov. 8
  - No. 1 Kansas defeated No. 9 North Carolina, 92–89 (Allen Fieldhouse, Lawrence, KS)
- Nov. 25
  - No. 4 Auburn defeated No. 5 Iowa State, 83–81 (Maui Invitational – Lahaina Civic Center, Lahaina, HI)
- Nov. 26
  - No. 9 Alabama defeated No. 6 Houston, 85–80^{OT} (Players Era Festival – MGM Grand Garden Arena, Paradise, NV)
- Dec. 4
  - No. 6 Iowa State defeated No. 5 Marquette, 81–70 (Big East–Big 12 Battle – Hilton Coliseum, Ames, IA)
  - No. 9 Duke defeated No. 2 Auburn, 84–78 (ACC–SEC Challenge – Cameron Indoor Stadium, Durham, NC)
- Dec. 7
  - No. 4 Kentucky defeated No. 7 Gonzaga, 90–89^{OT} (Battle in Seattle – Climate Pledge Arena, Seattle, WA)
- Jan. 4, 2025
  - No. 10 Kentucky defeated No. 6 Florida, 106–100 (Rivalry – Rupp Arena, Lexington, KY)
- Jan. 7
  - No. 8 Florida defeated No. 1 Tennessee, 73–43 (O'Connell Center, Gainesville, FL)
- Jan. 11
  - No. 5 Alabama defeated No. 10 Texas A&M, 94–88 (Reed Arena, College Station, TX)
- Jan. 15
  - No. 2 Iowa State defeated No. 9 Kansas, 74–57 (Hilton Coliseum, Ames, IA)
- Jan. 18
  - No. 4 Alabama defeated No. 8 Kentucky, 102–97 (Rupp Arena, Lexington, KY)
- Jan. 25
  - No. 1 Auburn defeated No. 6 Tennessee, 53–51 (Neville Arena, Auburn, AL)
- Feb. 1
  - No. 8 Tennessee defeated No. 5 Florida, 64–44 (Thompson–Boling Arena, Knoxville, TN)
- Feb. 8
  - No. 6 Florida defeated No. 1 Auburn, 90–81 (Neville Arena, Auburn, AL)
- Feb. 15
  - No. 1 Auburn defeated No. 2 Alabama, 94–85 (Rivalry – Coleman Coliseum, Tuscaloosa, AL)
- Feb. 22
  - No. 6 Tennessee defeated No. 7 Texas A&M, 77–69 (Reed Arena, College Station, TX)
  - No. 5 Houston defeated No. 8 Iowa State, 68–59 (Fertitta Center, Houston, Texas)
- Feb. 24
  - No. 4 Houston defeated No. 10 Texas Tech, 69–61 (United Supermarkets Arena, Lubbock, TX)
- Mar. 1
  - No. 5 Tennessee defeated No. 6 Alabama, 79–76 (Thompson–Boling Arena, Knoxville, TN)
- Mar. 5
  - No. 5 Florida defeated No. 7 Alabama, 99–94 (Coleman Coliseum, Tuscaloosa, AL)
- Mar. 8
  - No. 7 Alabama defeated No. 1 Auburn, 93–91^{OT} (Rivalry – Neville Arena, Auburn, AL)

=== Conference tournament ===
- Mar. 15
  - No. 8 Tennessee defeated No. 3 Auburn, 70–65 (SEC tournament – Bridgestone Arena, Nashville, TN)
  - No. 4 Florida defeated No. 5 Alabama, 104–82 (SEC tournament – Bridgestone Arena, Nashville, TN)
- Mar. 16
  - No. 4 Florida defeated No. 8 Tennessee, 86–77 (SEC tournament – Bridgestone Arena, Nashville, TN)

=== Postseason tournament ===
- Mar. 29
  - No. 3 Florida defeated No. 9 Texas Tech, 84–79 (Elite Eight – Chase Center, San Francisco, CA)
  - No. 1 Duke defeated No. 7 Alabama, 85–65 (Elite Eight – Prudential Center, Newark, NJ)
- Mar. 30
  - No. 2 Houston defeated No. 6 Tennessee, 69–50 (Elite Eight – Lucas Oil Stadium, Indianapolis, IN)
  - No. 4 Auburn defeated No. 8 Michigan State, 70–64 (Elite Eight – State Farm Arena, Atlanta, GA)
- Apr. 5
  - No. 3 Florida defeated No. 4 Auburn, 79–73 (Final Four – Alamodome, San Antonio, TX)
  - No. 2 Houston defeated No. 1 Duke, 70–67 (Final Four – Alamodome, San Antonio, TX)
- Apr. 7
  - No. 3 Florida defeated No. 2 Houston, 65–63 (National Championship Game – Alamodome, San Antonio, TX)

== Regular season ==
=== Early-season tournaments ===
Names	Dates	Location	Teams	Champion	Runner-up	3rd-place winner
Greenbrier Tip-Off	November 15–24, 2024	The Greenbrier (White Sulphur Springs, WV)	8	Wisconsin (Mountain); UT Rio Grande Valley (River)	Pittsburgh (Mountain); Tennessee Tech (River)	LSU (Mountain); VMI (River)
Bahamas Championship	November 21−22, 2024	Baha Mar Convention Center (Nassau, Bahamas)	4	Tennessee	Baylor	St. John's
Legends Classic	November 21−22, 2024	Barclays Center (Brooklyn, NY)	4	Texas	Saint Joseph's	Texas Tech
Boardwalk Battle	November 21−23, 2024	Ocean Center (Daytona Beach, FL)	8	UC San Diego	Toledo	James Madison
Charleston Classic	November 21–24, 2024	TD Arena (Charleston, SC)	8	Drake	Vanderbilt	Seton Hall
Myrtle Beach Invitational	November 21–24, 2024	HTC Center (Conway, SC)	8	Bradley	Middle Tennessee	South Florida
Paradise Jam tournament	November 22−25, 2024	Sports and Fitness Center (Saint Thomas, USVI)	8	Liberty	McNeese	Kansas State
Cayman Islands Classic	November 24−26, 2024	John Gray Gymnasium (George Town, Cayman Islands)	8	Boston College	Boise State	South Dakota State
Sunshine Slam	November 25–26, 2024	Ocean Center (Daytona Beach, FL)	8	Clemson (Beach); Radford (Ocean)	Penn State (Beach); Purdue Fort Wayne (Ocean)	San Francisco (Beach); Drexel (Ocean)
Fort Myers Tip-Off	November 25–27, 2024	Suncoast Credit Union Arena (Fort Myers, FL)	8	Michigan (Beach); Miami (OH) (Palms)	Xavier (Beach); Mercer (Palms)	South Carolina (Beach); Jacksonville (Palms)
Maui Invitational	November 25–27, 2024	Lahaina Civic Center (Lahaina, HI)	8	Auburn	Memphis	Michigan State
Acrisure Holiday Invitational	November 26–27, 2024	Acrisure Arena (Palm Desert, CA)	4	SMU	Washington State	California Baptist
Cancún Challenge	November 26–27, 2024	Hard Rock Hotel – Riviera Maya (Cancún, Mexico)	8	Loyola Marymount (Riviera); Gardner–Webb (Mayan)	Wyoming (Riviera); Bethune–Cookman (Mayan)	Belmont (Riviera); Southeastern Louisiana (Mayan)
Players Era Festival	November 26–30, 2024	MGM Grand Garden Arena (Paradise, NV)	8	Oregon	Alabama	San Diego State
Battle 4 Atlantis	November 27−29, 2024	Imperial Arena (Paradise Island, Bahamas)	8	Oklahoma	Louisville	West Virginia
Acrisure Classic	November 28−29, 2024	Acrisure Arena (Palm Desert, CA)	4	Arizona State	Saint Mary's	New Mexico
Acrisure Invitational	November 28−29, 2024	Acrisure Arena (Palm Desert, CA)	4	Washington	Santa Clara	Colorado State
ESPN Events Invitational	November 28−29, 2024	State Farm Field House (Lake Buena Vista, FL)	4	Florida	Wichita State	Wake Forest
NIT Season Tip-Off	November 28−29, 2024	State Farm Field House (Lake Buena Vista, FL)	4	Utah State	North Texas	St. Bonaventure
Rady Children's Invitational	November 28−29, 2024	LionTree Arena (San Diego, CA)	4	Purdue	Ole Miss	BYU
Arizona Tip-Off	November 28−30, 2024	Mullett Arena (Tempe, AZ)	8	Butler (Cactus); Weber State (Desert)	Mississippi State (Cactus); Pepperdine (Desert)	Northwestern (Cactus); Bowling Green (Desert)
Western Slam	November 28–30, 2024	VisitLethbridge.com Arena	4	UC Irvine	Kent State	Kennesaw State
Big 5 Classic	November 12−December 7, 2024	Wells Fargo Center (final rounds) (Philadelphia, PA)	6	Saint Joseph's	La Salle	Villanova
Sun Bowl Invitational	December 20−21, 2024	Don Haskins Center (El Paso, TX)	4	UTEP	Yale	Akron
Diamond Head Classic	December 22−25, 2024	Stan Sheriff Center (Honolulu, HI)	8	Nebraska	Oregon State	Hawaii

=== Head-to-head conference challenges ===
Conference matchup	Dates	Conference winner	Conference loser	Record
ACC–SEC Challenge	December 3−4	SEC	ACC	14–2
ASUN–SoCon Challenge	November 4 – December 16	SoCon	ASUN	11–9
Big Sky–Summit Challenge	December 4−7	Summit	Big Sky	11–7
Big East–Big 12 Battle	December 3−8	Big 12	Big East	6–5
Conference USA–WAC Challenge	November 9 − December 30	CUSA	WAC	14–4
MAC–SBC Challenge	November 4 – February 8	**Tied**		12–12

=== Upsets ===
Winner	Score	Loser	Date	Tournament/event	Notes
UCF	64–61	No. 13 Texas A&M	November 4, 2024		
Ohio State	80–72	No. 19 Texas	November 4, 2024	Hall of Fame Series – Las Vegas	
New Mexico	72–64	No. 22 UCLA	November 8, 2024	Las Vegas Hoopfest	Game played in Henderson, NV
Wisconsin	103–88	No. 9 Arizona	November 15, 2024		
**Nebraska**	74–63	No. 14 Creighton	November 22, 2024	Rivalry	
Georgia	66–63	No. 22 St. John's	November 24, 2024	Atlantis Resort Series	Game played at Atlantis Paradise Island in the Bahamas
Kennesaw State	79–77	No. 24 Rutgers	November 24, 2024		First win over an AP Top 25 opponent in school history
Memphis	99–97^{OT}	No. 2 UConn	November 25, 2024	Maui Invitational	
San Diego State	71–53	No. 21 Creighton	November 26, 2024	Players Era Festival	
Colorado	73–72	No. 2 UConn	November 26, 2024	Maui Invitational	
Oregon	80–70	No. 20 Texas A&M	November 26, 2024	Players Era Festival	
Louisville	89–61	No. 14 Indiana	November 27, 2024	Battle 4 Atlantis	
West Virginia	86–78^{OT}	No. 3 Gonzaga	November 27, 2024	Battle 4 Atlantis	First overtime win for West Virginia since 2019
Michigan	78–53	No. 22 Xavier	November 27, 2024	Fort Myers Tip-Off	
Michigan State	94–91^{OT}	No. 12 North Carolina	November 27, 2024	Maui Invitational	
Dayton	85–67	No. 2 UConn	November 27, 2024	Maui Invitational	First top 2 team to lose to unranked opponent for three consecutive days
Illinois	90–77	No. 19 Arkansas	November 28, 2024	Thanksgiving Hoops Showcase	Game played in Kansas City, MO
Oklahoma	82–77	No. 24 Arizona	November 28, 2024	Battle 4 Atlantis	
West Virginia	83–76^{OT}	No. 24 Arizona	November 29, 2024	Battle 4 Atlantis	
Butler	87–77	No. 25 Mississippi State	November 29, 2024	Arizona Tip-Off	
San Diego State	73–70^{OT}	No. 6 Houston	November 30, 2024	Players Era Festival	
Oregon	83–81	No. 9 Alabama	November 30, 2024	Players Era Festival	
Villanova	68–60	No. 14 Cincinnati	December 3, 2024	Big East–Big 12 Battle	
**Michigan**	67–64	No. 11 Wisconsin	December 3, 2024		
Clemson	70–66	No. 4 Kentucky	December 3, 2024	ACC–SEC Challenge	
Creighton	76–63	No. 1 Kansas	December 4, 2024	Big East–Big 12 Battle	
Mississippi State	90–57	No. 18 Pittsburgh	December 4, 2024	ACC–SEC Challenge	
Penn State	81–70	No. 8 Purdue	December 5, 2024		
Northwestern	70–66^{OT}	No. 19 Illinois	December 6, 2024	Rivalry	
Missouri	76–67	No. 1 Kansas	December 8, 2024	Border War	
**Arkansas State**	85–72	No. 16 Memphis	December 8, 2024		
**UCLA**	73–71	No. 12 Oregon	December 8, 2024		
Illinois	86–80	No. 20 Wisconsin	December 10, 2024		
Arkansas	89–87	No. 14 Michigan	December 10, 2024	Jimmy V Classic	
**Memphis**	87–82^{OT}	No. 16 Clemson	December 14, 2024		
Dayton	71–63	No. 6 Marquette	December 14, 2024		
South Carolina	91–88^{OT}	No. 25 Clemson	December 17, 2024	Rivalry	
**Mississippi State**	79–66	No. 21 Memphis	December 21, 2024		
North Carolina	76–74	No. 18 UCLA	December 21, 2024	CBS Sports Classic	
Ohio State	85–65	No. 4 Kentucky	December 21, 2024	CBS Sports Classic	
Memphis	87–70	No. 16 Ole Miss	December 28, 2024	Rivalry	
**Utah State**	67–66	No. 20 San Diego State	December 28, 2024		
Kansas State	70–67	No. 16 Cincinnati	December 30, 2024		
**West Virginia**	62–61	No. 7 Kansas	December 31, 2024		First win at Allen Fieldhouse
Nebraska	66–58	No. 15 UCLA	January 4, 2025		
**Arizona**	72–67	No. 16 Cincinnati	January 4, 2025		
**Arizona**	75–56	No. 21 West Virginia	January 7, 2025		
No. 8 Florida	73–43	No. 1 Tennessee	January 7, 2025		Worst loss by an unbeaten AP No. 1 since 1968
Georgia	82–69	No. 6 Kentucky	January 7, 2025		
Villanova	68–66	No. 9 UConn	January 8, 2025		
Maryland	79–61	No. 22 UCLA	January 10, 2025		
**USC**	82–72	No. 13 Illinois	January 11, 2025		First win over a ranked team on the road since 2010
Georgia	72–62	No. 17 Oklahoma	January 11, 2025		
**Missouri**	83–82	No. 5 Florida	January 14, 2025		
Arizona	81–70	No. 25 Baylor	January 14, 2025		
UNLV	65–62	No. 22 Utah State	January 15, 2025		
Minnesota	84–81^{OT}	No. 20 Michigan	January 16, 2025		
Temple	88–81	No. 18 Memphis	January 16, 2025		
Oregon State	97–89^{OT}	No. 16 Gonzaga	January 16, 2025		
**Creighton**	68–63	No. 14 UConn	January 18, 2025		
**Xavier**	59–57	No. 7 Marquette	January 18, 2025		
Vanderbilt	76–75	No. 6 Tennessee	January 18, 2025	Rivalry	
West Virginia	64–57	No. 2 Iowa State	January 18, 2025		
**Santa Clara**	103–99	No. 16 Gonzaga	January 18, 2025		
**TCU**	74–71	No. 25 Baylor	January 19, 2025		
**Ohio State**	73–70	No. 11 Purdue	January 21, 2025		
**Arizona State**	65–57	No. 23 West Virginia	January 21, 2025		
Texas	61–53	No. 22 Missouri	January 21, 2025		
UCLA	85–83	No. 18 Wisconsin	January 21, 2025		
**Maryland**	91–70	No. 17 Illinois	January 23, 2025		
Vanderbilt	74–69	No. 9 Kentucky	January 25, 2025		
Texas	70–69	No. 13 Texas A&M	January 25, 2025	Lone Star Showdown	
Minnesota	77–69	No. 15 Oregon	January 25, 2025		
Kansas State	73–60	No. 23 West Virginia	January 25, 2025		
Xavier	76–72	No. 19 UConn	January 25, 2025		
Arizona	86–75^{OT}	No. 3 Iowa State	January 27, 2025		
Maryland	76–68	No. 17 Wisconsin	January 29, 2025		
Nebraska	80–74^{OT}	No. 18 Illinois	January 30, 2025		
UCLA	78–52	No. 16 Oregon	January 30, 2025		
**Kansas State**	80–61	No. 3 Iowa State	February 1, 2025		
Oklahoma	97–67	No. 24 Vanderbilt	February 1, 2025		
Georgia Tech	77–70	No. 21 Louisville	February 1, 2025		
Baylor	81–70	No. 11 Kansas	February 1, 2025		Largest comeback win for Baylor since November 2016 of a 21-point deficit, and this would be the largest blown lead for Kansas in program history.
USC	70–64	No. 7 Michigan State	February 1, 2025		
**Arkansas**	89–79	No. 12 Kentucky	February 1, 2025		John Calipari's first game at Rupp Arena as Arkansas head coach
**Nebraska**	77–71	No. 16 Oregon	February 2, 2025		
UCLA	63–61	No. 9 Michigan State	February 4, 2025		
Rutgers	82–73	No. 23 Illinois	February 5, 2025		
Ohio State	73–70	No. 18 Maryland	February 6, 2025		
Kansas State	81–73	No. 16 Kansas	February 8, 2025	Sunflower Showdown	
Creighton	77–67	No. 11 Marquette	February 8, 2025		
**No. 6 Florida**	90–81	No. 1 Auburn	February 8, 2025		First road win over an AP No. 1 in program history
Clemson	77–71	No. 2 Duke	February 8, 2025		
Kansas State	73–70	No. 13 Arizona	February 11, 2025		
**Indiana**	71–67	No. 11 Michigan State	February 11, 2025		
**UConn**	70–66	No. 24 Creighton	February 11, 2025		
Villanova	73–71	No. 9 St. John's	February 12, 2025		
Texas	82–78	No. 15 Kentucky	February 15, 2025		
Utah	74–67	No. 17 Kansas	February 15, 2025		
Wichita State	84–79^{OT}	No. 14 Memphis	February 16, 2025		
TCU	69–66	No. 9 Texas Tech	February 18, 2025		
BYU	91–57	No. 23 Kansas	February 18, 2025		
Villanova	81–66	No. 16 Marquette	February 21, 2025		
**Oregon**	77–73^{OT}	No. 11 Wisconsin	February 22, 2025		
Oklahoma	93–87	No. 21 Mississippi State	February 22, 2025		
Vanderbilt	77–72	No. 24 Ole Miss	February 22, 2025		
Arkansas	92–85	No. 15 Missouri	February 22, 2025		
**BYU**	96–95	No. 19 Arizona	February 22, 2025		
Indiana	73–58	No. 13 Purdue	February 23, 2025	Rivalry/Indiana National Guard Governor's Cup	
Georgia	88–83	No. 3 Florida	February 25, 2025		
Oklahoma State	74–68	No. 9 Iowa State	February 25, 2025		
**Vanderbilt**	86–84	No. 12 Texas A&M	February 26, 2025		
Vanderbilt	97–93^{OT}	No. 14 Missouri	March 1, 2025		
**Illinois**	93–73	No. 15 Michigan	March 2, 2025		
**Texas**	87–82^{OT}	No. 25 Mississippi State	March 4, 2025		
No. 22 Texas A&M	83–72	No. 1 Auburn	March 4, 2025		First win over an AP No. 1 team in program history
Oklahoma	96–84	No. 15 Missouri	March 5, 2025		
UConn	72–66	No. 20 Marquette	March 5, 2025		
Ole Miss	78–76	No. 4 Tennessee	March 5, 2025		
Illinois	88–80	No. 18 Purdue	March 7, 2025		
Arkansas	93–92	No. 25 Mississippi State	March 8, 2025		
**Penn State**	86–75	No. 12 Wisconsin	March 8, 2025		First win at Wisconsin since 1995
**No. 7 Alabama**	93–91^{OT}	No. 1 Auburn	March 8, 2025	Rivalry	
Kansas	83–76	No. 24 Arizona	March 8, 2025		
Gonzaga	58–51	No. 19 Saint Mary's	March 11, 2025	West Coast Tournament	Gonzaga was a 3.5-point favorite in at least one Las Vegas sportsbook.
Texas	94–89^{2OT}	No. 14 Texas A&M	March 13, 2025	SEC Tournament	
Arizona	86–80	No. 9 Texas Tech	March 14, 2025	Big 12 Tournament	

In addition to the above listed upsets in which an unranked team defeated a ranked team, there were six non-Division I teams that defeated a Division I team during the season. Bold type indicates winning teams in "true road games"—i.e., those played on an opponent's home court (including secondary homes).

Winner	Score	Loser	Date	Tournament/event	Notes
Xavier (LA) (NAIA)	62–56	Alcorn State	November 9, 2024		
**Rogers State (Division II)**	69–68	Oral Roberts	November 25, 2024		
**Michigan Tech (Division II)**	72–70	Green Bay	December 18, 2024		
**UNT Dallas (NAIA)**	69–68	Rice	December 19, 2024		
**Bowie State (Division II)**	76–73	Howard	January 15, 2025		
**Morehouse (Division II)**	79–76	Howard	January 20, 2025		

=== Conference winners and tournaments ===
Each of the 31 active Division I athletic conferences ended its regular season with a single-elimination tournament. The team with the best regular-season record in each conference received the number one seed in each tournament, with tiebreakers used as needed in the case of ties for the top seeding. Unless otherwise noted, the winners of these tournaments received automatic invitations to the 2025 NCAA Division I men's basketball tournament.

Conference	Regular season first place	Conference player of the year	Conference coach of the year	Conference tournament	Tournament venue (city)	Tournament winner
America East Conference	Bryant	Earl Timberlake, Bryant	Phil Martelli Jr., Bryant	2025 America East men's basketball tournament	Campus sites	Bryant
American Athletic Conference	Memphis	PJ Haggerty, Memphis	Penny Hardaway, Memphis; Amir Abdur-Rahim, South Florida	2025 American Athletic Conference men's basketball tournament	Dickies Arena (Fort Worth, TX)	Memphis
Atlantic Sun Conference	Lipscomb (Note: Top seed in conference tournament.) & North Alabama	Jacob Ognacevic, Lipscomb	Lennie Acuff, Lipscomb	2025 ASUN men's basketball tournament	Campus sites	Lipscomb
Atlantic 10 Conference	VCU & George Mason	Max Shulga, VCU	Tony Skinn, George Mason	2025 Atlantic 10 men's basketball tournament	Capital One Arena (Washington, DC)	VCU
Atlantic Coast Conference	Duke	Cooper Flagg, Duke	Pat Kelsey, Louisville	2025 ACC men's basketball tournament	Spectrum Center (Charlotte, NC)	Duke
Big 12 Conference	Houston	JT Toppin, Texas Tech	Kelvin Sampson, Houston	2025 Big 12 men's basketball tournament	T-Mobile Center (Kansas City, MO)	Houston
Big East Conference	St. John's	RJ Luis Jr., St. John's	Rick Pitino, St. John's	2025 Big East men's basketball tournament	Madison Square Garden (New York, NY)	St. John's
Big Sky Conference	Montana & Northern Colorado	Dylan Darling, Idaho State	Travis DeCuire, Montana	2025 Big Sky Conference men's basketball tournament	Idaho Central Arena (Boise, ID)	Montana
Big South Conference	High Point	Taje' Kelly, Charleston Southern	Alan Huss, High Point	2025 Big South Conference men's basketball tournament	Freedom Hall Civic Center (Johnson City, TN)	High Point
Big Ten Conference	Michigan State	Braden Smith, Purdue	Tom Izzo, Michigan State	2025 Big Ten men's basketball tournament	Gainbridge Fieldhouse (Indianapolis, IN)	Michigan
Big West Conference	UC San Diego	Aniwaniwa Tait-Jones, UC San Diego	Eric Olen, UC San Diego	2025 Big West Conference men's basketball tournament	Lee's Family Forum (Henderson, NV)	UC San Diego
Coastal Athletic Association	Towson	Tyler Tejada, Towson	Pat Skerry, Towson	2025 CAA men's basketball tournament	CareFirst Arena (Washington, DC)	UNC Wilmington
Conference USA	Liberty	Jaron Pierre Jr., Jacksonville State	Ray Harper, Jacksonville State	2025 Conference USA men's basketball tournament	Propst Arena (Huntsville, AL)	Liberty
Horizon League	Robert Morris	Alvaro Folgueiras, Robert Morris	Andy Toole, Robert Morris	2025 Horizon League men's basketball tournament	Quarterfinals: Campus sites Semifinals and final: Corteva Coliseum (Indianapolis, IN)	Robert Morris
Ivy League	Yale	Bez Mbeng, Yale	Dartmouth (head coach: David McLaughlin) (Note: The Ivy League presents its top coaching honor to an entire staff instead of the head coach, although that coach is specifically named in the award announcement.)	2025 Ivy League men's basketball tournament	Pizzitola Sports Center (Providence, RI)	Yale
Metro Atlantic Athletic Conference	Quinnipiac	Amarri Monroe, Quinnipiac	Tom Pecora, Quinnipiac	2025 MAAC men's basketball tournament	Boardwalk Hall (Atlantic City, NJ)	Mount St. Mary's
Mid-American Conference	Akron	Nate Johnson, Akron	John Groce, Akron	2025 Mid-American Conference men's basketball tournament	Rocket Arena (Cleveland, OH)	Akron
Mid-Eastern Athletic Conference	Norfolk State & South Carolina State	Blake Harper, Howard	Erik Martin, South Carolina State	2025 MEAC men's basketball tournament	Norfolk Scope (Norfolk, VA)	Norfolk State
Missouri Valley Conference	Drake	Bennett Stirtz, Drake	Ben McCollum, Drake	2025 Missouri Valley Conference men's basketball tournament	Enterprise Center (St. Louis, MO)	Drake
Mountain West Conference	New Mexico	Donovan Dent, New Mexico	Richard Pitino, New Mexico	2025 Mountain West Conference men's basketball tournament	Thomas & Mack Center (Paradise, NV)	Colorado State
Northeast Conference	Central Connecticut	Jordan Jones, Central Connecticut	Patrick Sellers, Central Connecticut	2025 Northeast Conference men's basketball tournament	Campus sites	Saint Francis
Ohio Valley Conference	Southeast Missouri State	Ray'Sean Taylor, SIU Edwardsville	Brad Korn, Southeast Missouri State	2025 Ohio Valley Conference men's basketball tournament	Ford Center (Evansville, IN)	SIU Edwardsville
Patriot League	American & Bucknell	Noah Williamson, Bucknell	John Griffin III, Bucknell	2025 Patriot League men's basketball tournament	Campus sites	American
Southeastern Conference	Auburn	Johni Broome, Auburn	Bruce Pearl, Auburn	2025 SEC men's basketball tournament	Bridgestone Arena (Nashville, TN)	Florida
Southern Conference	Chattanooga	Quimari Peterson, ETSU	Dan Earl, Chattanooga	2025 Southern Conference men's basketball tournament	Harrah's Cherokee Center (Asheville, NC)	Wofford
Southland Conference	McNeese	Javohn Garcia, McNeese	Will Wade, McNeese	2025 Southland Conference men's basketball tournament	The Legacy Center (Lake Charles, LA)	McNeese
Southwestern Athletic Conference	Southern	Sterling Young, Florida A&M	Kevin Johnson, Southern	2025 SWAC men's basketball tournament	Gateway Center Arena (College Park, GA)	Alabama State
Summit League	Omaha	Marquel Sutton, Omaha	Chris Crutchfield, Omaha	2025 Summit League men's basketball tournament	Denny Sanford Premier Center (Sioux Falls, SD)	Omaha
Sun Belt Conference	Arkansas State, James Madison, South Alabama, & Troy	Tayton Conerway, Troy	Richie Riley, South Alabama	2025 Sun Belt Conference men's basketball tournament	Pensacola Bay Center (Pensacola, FL)	Troy
West Coast Conference	Saint Mary's	Augustas Marčiulionis, Saint Mary's	Randy Bennett, Saint Mary's	2025 West Coast Conference men's basketball tournament	Orleans Arena (Paradise, NV)	Gonzaga
Western Athletic Conference	Utah Valley	Dominick Nelson, Utah Valley	Todd Phillips, Utah Valley	2025 WAC men's basketball tournament	Orleans Arena (Paradise, NV)	Grand Canyon

== Postseason tournaments ==
The NCAA tournament tipped off on March 18, 2025 with the First Four in Dayton, Ohio, and concluded on April 7 at the Alamodome in San Antonio, Texas. A total of 68 teams entered the tournament. Thirty-one of the teams earned automatic bids by winning their conferences' tournaments. The remaining 37 teams were granted "at-large" bids, which were extended by the NCAA Selection Committee.

=== Final Four – Alamodome in San Antonio, Texas ===
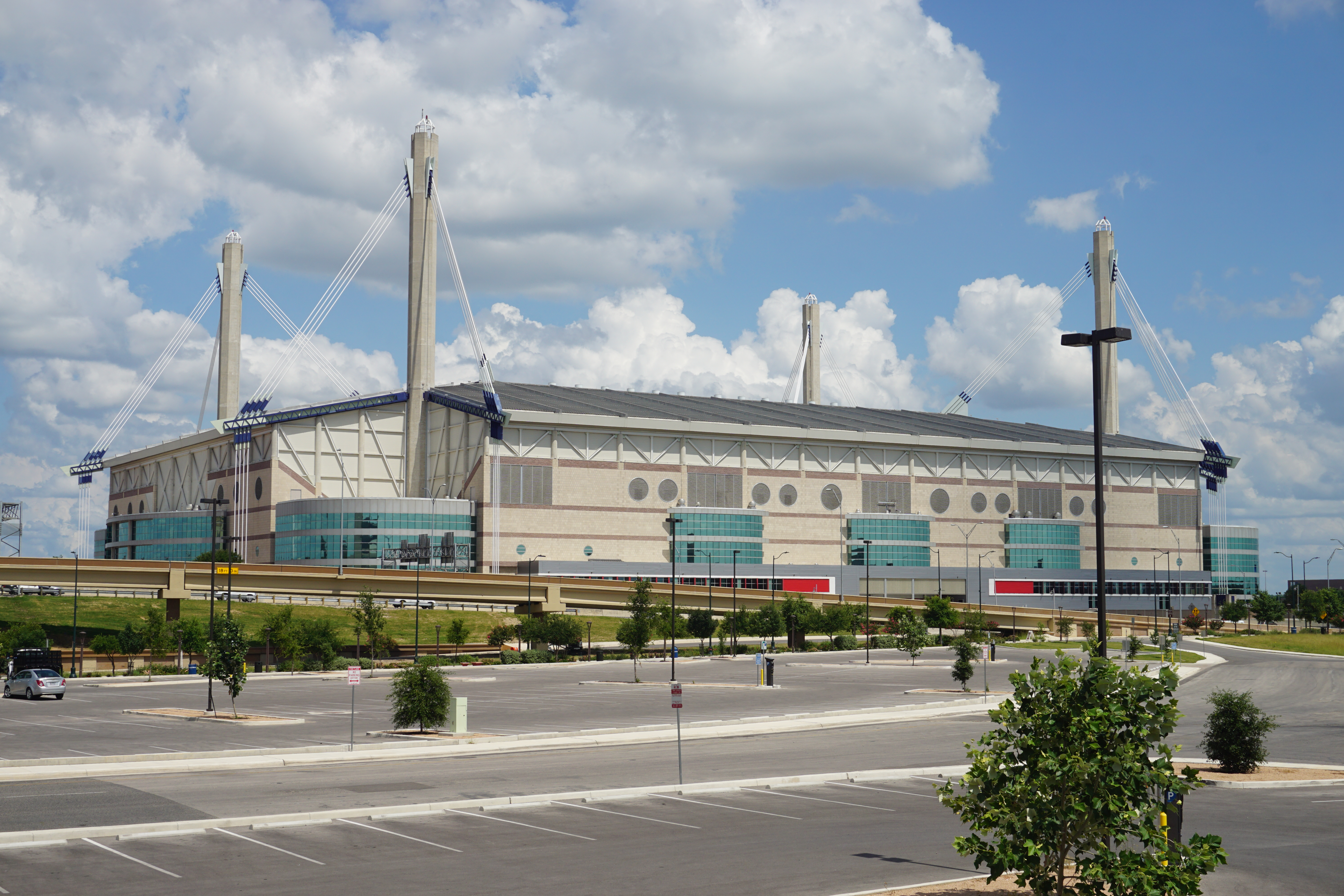
The Alamodome in San Antonio, Texas, hosted the NCAA men's Final Four.

National Semifinals; April 5
S1	Auburn	73
W1	Florida	79
E1	Duke	67
MW1	Houston	70

National Championship; April 7
W1	Florida	65
MW1	Houston	63

=== Tournament upsets ===
Per the NCAA, an upset occurs when the losing team in an NCAA tournament game was seeded at least two seed lines better than the winning team.

Upsets in the 2025 NCAA Division I men's basketball tournament
Round	West	Midwest	South	East
Round of 64	No. 12 Colorado State defeated No. 5 Memphis 78–70; No. 11 Drake defeated No. 6 Missouri 67–57; No. 10 Arkansas defeated No. 7 Kansas 79–72	No. 12 McNeese defeated No. 5 Clemson 69–67	No. 10 New Mexico defeated No. 7 Marquette 75–66	None
Round of 32	No. 10 Arkansas defeated No. 2 St. John's 75–66	None	No. 6 Ole Miss defeated No. 3 Iowa State 91–78	No. 6 BYU defeated No. 3 Wisconsin 91–89
Sweet 16	None	None	None	None
Elite 8	None	None	None	None
Final 4	None			
National Championship	None			

=== National Invitation Tournament ===
After the NCAA tournament field was announced, the National Invitation Tournament invited 32 teams to participate. Eleven teams were given exempt bids based on a ranking index, and 21 other teams were invited for winning their conference regular seasons or at-large bids. The first three rounds were played at campus sites, with the semifinals and final taking place at Hinkle Fieldhouse in Indianapolis.

=== Semifinals and final ===
Semifinals; April 1 Hinkle Fieldhouse
2	North Texas	67
1	UC Irvine	69
Loyola Chicago	73
Chattanooga	80

Final; April 3 Hinkle Fieldhouse
1	UC Irvine	84 ^{OT}
Chattanooga	85

=== College Basketball Invitational ===
After the NCAA tournament field was announced, the College Basketball Invitational invited 11 teams to participate at the Ocean Center in Daytona Beach, Florida.

==== Semifinals and finals ====
Semifinals; March 25
Illinois State	78
Incarnate Word	73
Florida Gulf Coast	65
Cleveland State	72

Championship; March 26
Illinois State	79
Cleveland State	68

=== College Basketball Crown ===
After the NCAA tournament field was announced, the College Basketball Crown tournament invited 16 teams to participate at the Las Vegas Strip in Paradise, Nevada.

==== Semifinals and finals ====
Semifinals; April 5
Boise State	79
Nebraska	89
UCF	104
Villanova	98^{OT}

Championship; April 6
Nebraska	77
UCF	66

== Conference standings ==
2024–25 America East Conference men's basketball standings
	Conf.				Overall
Team	W		L	PCT	W		L	PCT
Bryant †	14	–	2	.875	23	–	12	.657
Vermont	13	–	3	.813	21	–	12	.636
Maine	10	–	6	.625	20	–	14	.588
Albany	8	–	8	.500	17	–	16	.515
Binghamton	7	–	9	.438	15	–	17	.469
UMass Lowell	6	–	10	.375	17	–	15	.531
New Hampshire	6	–	10	.375	8	–	24	.250
UMBC	5	–	11	.313	13	–	19	.406
NJIT	3	–	13	.188	6	–	25	.194
† 2025 AmEast tournament winner

2024–25 American Athletic Conference men's basketball standings
	Conf.				Overall
Team	W		L	PCT	W		L	PCT
No. 25 Memphis †	16	–	2	.889	29	–	6	.829
North Texas	14	–	4	.778	27	–	9	.750
UAB	13	–	5	.722	24	–	13	.649
Tulane	12	–	6	.667	19	–	15	.559
Florida Atlantic	10	–	8	.556	18	–	16	.529
East Carolina	10	–	8	.556	19	–	14	.576
Temple	9	–	9	.500	17	–	15	.531
Wichita State	8	–	10	.444	19	–	15	.559
South Florida	6	–	12	.333	13	–	19	.406
Tulsa	6	–	12	.333	13	–	20	.394
UTSA	6	–	12	.333	12	–	19	.387
Rice	4	–	14	.222	13	–	19	.406
Charlotte	3	–	15	.167	11	–	22	.333
† 2025 AAC tournament winner Rankings from AP Poll

2024–25 Atlantic 10 men's basketball standings
	Conf.				Overall
Team	W		L	PCT	W		L	PCT
VCU †	15	–	3	.833	28	–	7	.800
George Mason	15	–	3	.833	27	–	9	.750
Dayton	12	–	6	.667	23	–	11	.676
Loyola Chicago	12	–	6	.667	25	–	12	.676
Saint Louis	11	–	7	.611	19	–	15	.559
Saint Joseph's	11	–	7	.611	22	–	13	.629
George Washington	9	–	9	.500	21	–	13	.618
St. Bonaventure	9	–	9	.500	22	–	12	.647
Duquesne	8	–	10	.444	13	–	19	.406
Rhode Island	7	–	11	.389	18	–	13	.581
UMass	7	–	11	.389	12	–	20	.375
Davidson	6	–	12	.333	17	–	16	.515
Richmond	5	–	13	.278	10	–	22	.313
La Salle	5	–	13	.278	14	–	19	.424
Fordham	3	–	15	.167	12	–	21	.364
† 2025 A-10 tournament winner

2024–25 ACC men's basketball standings
	Conf.				Overall
Team	W		L	PCT	W		L	PCT
No. 3 Duke †	19	–	1	.950	35	–	4	.897
No. 21 Louisville	18	–	2	.900	27	–	8	.771
No. 22 Clemson	18	–	2	.900	27	–	7	.794
Wake Forest	13	–	7	.650	21	–	11	.656
North Carolina	13	–	7	.650	23	–	14	.622
SMU	13	–	7	.650	24	–	11	.686
Stanford	11	–	9	.550	21	–	14	.600
Georgia Tech	10	–	10	.500	17	–	17	.500
Virginia	8	–	12	.400	15	–	17	.469
Virginia Tech	8	–	12	.400	13	–	19	.406
Florida State	8	–	12	.400	17	–	15	.531
Notre Dame	8	–	12	.400	15	–	18	.455
Pittsburgh	8	–	12	.400	17	–	15	.531
Syracuse	7	–	13	.350	14	–	19	.424
California	6	–	14	.300	14	–	19	.424
NC State	5	–	15	.250	12	–	19	.387
Boston College	4	–	16	.200	12	–	19	.387
Miami (FL)	3	–	17	.150	7	–	24	.226
† 2025 ACC tournament winner Rankings from AP poll

2024–25 ASUN men's basketball standings
	Conf.				Overall
Team	W		L	PCT	W		L	PCT
Lipscomb †	14	–	4	.778	25	–	10	.714
North Alabama	14	–	4	.778	24	–	11	.686
Florida Gulf Coast	13	–	5	.722	19	–	15	.559
Jacksonville	12	–	6	.667	19	–	14	.576
Eastern Kentucky	12	–	6	.667	18	–	14	.563
Queens*	11	–	7	.611	20	–	15	.571
Austin Peay	8	–	10	.444	14	–	19	.424
North Florida	8	–	10	.444	15	–	17	.469
Stetson	6	–	12	.333	8	–	24	.250
Central Arkansas	4	–	14	.222	9	–	24	.273
West Georgia*	4	–	14	.222	6	–	25	.194
Bellarmine	2	–	16	.111	5	–	26	.161
† 2025 ASUN tournament winner * ineligible for the 2025 NCAA tournament due to transition from Division II

2024–25 Big 12 men's basketball standings
	Conf.				Overall
Team	W		L	PCT	W		L	PCT
No. 2 Houston †	19	–	1	.950	35	–	5	.875
No. 8 Texas Tech	15	–	5	.750	28	–	9	.757
No. 15 Arizona	14	–	6	.700	24	–	13	.649
No. 13 BYU	14	–	6	.700	26	–	10	.722
No. 17 Iowa State	13	–	7	.650	25	–	10	.714
Kansas	11	–	9	.550	21	–	13	.618
Baylor	10	–	10	.500	20	–	15	.571
West Virginia	10	–	10	.500	19	–	13	.594
TCU	9	–	11	.450	16	–	16	.500
Kansas State	9	–	11	.450	16	–	17	.485
Utah	8	–	12	.400	16	–	17	.485
Oklahoma State	7	–	13	.350	17	–	18	.486
Cincinnati	7	–	13	.350	19	–	16	.543
UCF	7	–	13	.350	20	–	17	.541
Arizona State	4	–	16	.200	13	–	20	.394
Colorado	3	–	17	.150	14	–	21	.400
† 2025 Big 12 tournament winner Rankings from AP poll

2024–25 Big East men's basketball standings
	Conf.				Overall
Team	W		L	PCT	W		L	PCT
No. 11 St. John's †	18	–	2	.900	31	–	5	.861
Creighton	15	–	5	.750	25	–	11	.694
UConn	14	–	6	.700	24	–	11	.686
Xavier	13	–	7	.650	22	–	12	.647
Marquette	13	–	7	.650	23	–	11	.676
Villanova	11	–	9	.550	21	–	15	.583
Georgetown	8	–	12	.400	18	–	16	.529
Providence	6	–	14	.300	12	–	20	.375
Butler	6	–	14	.300	15	–	20	.429
DePaul	4	–	16	.200	14	–	20	.412
Seton Hall	2	–	18	.100	7	–	25	.219
† 2025 Big East tournament winner Rankings from AP Poll

2024–25 Big Sky men's basketball standings
	Conf.				Overall
Team	W		L	PCT	W		L	PCT
Northern Colorado	15	–	3	.833	25	–	10	.714
Montana †	15	–	3	.833	25	–	10	.714
Portland State	11	–	7	.611	19	–	13	.594
Idaho State	10	–	8	.556	15	–	15	.500
Montana State	9	–	9	.500	15	–	18	.455
Idaho	8	–	10	.444	14	–	19	.424
Northern Arizona	8	–	10	.444	18	–	16	.529
Eastern Washington	6	–	12	.333	10	–	22	.313
Weber State	5	–	13	.278	12	–	22	.353
Sacramento State	3	–	15	.167	7	–	25	.219
† Conference tournament winner

2024–25 Big South men's basketball standings
	Conf.				Overall
Team	W		L	PCT	W		L	PCT
High Point †	14	–	2	.875	29	–	6	.829
UNC Asheville	11	–	5	.688	21	–	11	.656
Winthrop	11	–	5	.688	23	–	11	.676
Radford	9	–	7	.563	20	–	13	.606
Presbyterian	7	–	9	.438	14	–	19	.424
Longwood	7	–	9	.438	18	–	14	.563
Charleston Southern	6	–	10	.375	10	–	22	.313
Gardner–Webb	5	–	11	.313	11	–	20	.355
USC Upstate	2	–	14	.125	6	–	26	.188
† 2025 Big South tournament winner

2024–25 Big Ten Conference men's basketball standings
	Conf.				Overall
Team	W		L	PCT	W		L	PCT
No. 7 Michigan State	17	–	3	.850	30	–	7	.811
No. 9 Maryland	14	–	6	.700	27	–	9	.750
No. 10 Michigan †	14	–	6	.700	27	–	10	.730
UCLA	13	–	7	.650	23	–	11	.676
No. 16 Wisconsin	13	–	7	.650	27	–	10	.730
No. 14 Purdue	13	–	7	.650	24	–	12	.667
Illinois	12	–	8	.600	22	–	13	.629
Oregon	12	–	8	.600	25	–	10	.714
Indiana	10	–	10	.500	19	–	13	.594
Ohio State	9	–	11	.450	17	–	15	.531
Rutgers	8	–	12	.400	15	–	17	.469
Minnesota	7	–	13	.350	15	–	17	.469
Northwestern	7	–	13	.350	17	–	16	.515
USC	7	–	13	.350	17	–	18	.486
Iowa	7	–	13	.350	17	–	16	.515
Nebraska	7	–	13	.350	21	–	14	.600
Penn State	6	–	14	.300	16	–	15	.516
Washington	4	–	16	.200	13	–	18	.419
† 2025 Big Ten tournament winner Rankings from AP poll

2024–25 Big West men's basketball standings
	Conf.				Overall
Team	W		L	PCT	W		L	PCT
UC San Diego †	18	–	2	.900	30	–	5	.857
UC Irvine	17	–	3	.850	32	–	7	.821
UC Riverside	14	–	6	.700	21	–	13	.618
Cal State Northridge	14	–	6	.700	22	–	11	.667
UC Santa Barbara	11	–	9	.550	21	–	13	.618
UC Davis	9	–	11	.450	15	–	17	.469
Cal Poly	8	–	12	.400	16	–	19	.457
Cal State Bakersfield	8	–	12	.400	14	–	19	.424
Hawai'i	7	–	13	.350	15	–	16	.484
Long Beach State	3	–	17	.150	7	–	25	.219
Cal State Fullerton	1	–	19	.050	6	–	26	.188
† 2025 Big West tournament winner

2024–25 CAA men's basketball standings
	Conf.				Overall
Team	W		L	PCT	W		L	PCT
Towson	16	–	2	.889	22	–	11	.667
UNC Wilmington †	14	–	4	.778	27	–	8	.771
Charleston	13	–	5	.722	24	–	9	.727
William & Mary	11	–	7	.611	17	–	15	.531
Campbell	10	–	8	.556	15	–	17	.469
Monmouth	10	–	8	.556	13	–	20	.394
Northeastern	9	–	9	.500	17	–	15	.531
Drexel	9	–	9	.500	18	–	15	.545
Elon	8	–	10	.444	17	–	16	.515
Hampton	8	–	10	.444	17	–	16	.515
Hofstra	6	–	12	.333	15	–	18	.455
Delaware	5	–	13	.278	16	–	20	.444
Stony Brook	4	–	14	.222	8	–	24	.250
North Carolina A&T	3	–	15	.167	7	–	25	.219
† 2025 CAA tournament winner

2024–25 Conference USA men's basketball standings
	Conf.				Overall
Team	W		L	PCT	W		L	PCT
Liberty †	13	–	5	.722	28	–	7	.800
Jacksonville State	12	–	6	.667	23	–	13	.639
Middle Tennessee	12	–	6	.667	22	–	12	.647
Kennesaw State	10	–	8	.556	19	–	14	.576
New Mexico State	10	–	8	.556	17	–	15	.531
Louisiana Tech	9	–	9	.500	20	–	12	.625
Western Kentucky	8	–	10	.444	17	–	15	.531
UTEP	7	–	11	.389	18	–	15	.545
Sam Houston	6	–	12	.333	13	–	19	.406
FIU	3	–	15	.167	10	–	23	.303
† 2025 CUSA tournament winner

2024–25 Horizon League men's basketball standings
	Conf.				Overall
Team	W		L	PCT	W		L	PCT
Robert Morris †	15	–	5	.750	26	–	9	.743
Cleveland State	14	–	6	.700	23	–	13	.639
Milwaukee	14	–	6	.700	21	–	11	.656
Youngstown State	13	–	7	.650	21	–	13	.618
Purdue Fort Wayne	12	–	8	.600	19	–	13	.594
Oakland	11	–	9	.550	16	–	18	.471
Northern Kentucky	11	–	9	.550	17	–	16	.515
Wright State	8	–	12	.400	15	–	18	.455
IU Indy	6	–	14	.300	10	–	22	.313
Detroit Mercy	4	–	16	.200	8	–	24	.250
Green Bay	2	–	18	.100	4	–	28	.125
† 2025 Horizon League tournament winner

2024–25 Ivy League men's basketball standings
	Conf.				Overall
Team	W		L	PCT	W		L	PCT
Yale †	13	–	1	.929	22	–	8	.733
Cornell	9	–	5	.643	18	–	11	.621
Dartmouth	8	–	6	.571	14	–	14	.500
Princeton	8	–	6	.571	19	–	11	.633
Harvard	7	–	7	.500	12	–	15	.444
Brown	6	–	8	.429	14	–	13	.519
Penn	4	–	10	.286	8	–	19	.296
Columbia	1	–	13	.071	12	–	15	.444
† 2025 Ivy League tournament winner

2024–25 MAAC men's basketball standings
	Conf.				Overall
Team	W		L	PCT	W		L	PCT
Quinnipiac	15	–	5	.750	20	–	13	.606
Merrimack	14	–	6	.700	18	–	15	.545
Marist	13	–	7	.650	20	–	10	.667
Iona	12	–	8	.600	17	–	17	.500
Manhattan	12	–	8	.600	17	–	14	.548
Mount St. Mary's †	12	–	8	.600	23	–	13	.639
Sacred Heart	10	–	10	.500	15	–	18	.455
Rider	9	–	11	.450	14	–	19	.424
Siena	9	–	11	.450	14	–	18	.438
Fairfield	8	–	12	.400	12	–	20	.375
Saint Peter's	7	–	13	.350	12	–	16	.429
Niagara	6	–	14	.300	11	–	20	.355
Canisius	3	–	17	.150	3	–	28	.097
† 2025 MAAC tournament winner

2024–25 Mid-American Conference men's basketball standings
	Conf.				Overall
Team	W		L	PCT	W		L	PCT
Akron †	17	–	1	.944	28	–	7	.800
Miami (OH)	14	–	4	.778	25	–	9	.735
Kent State	11	–	7	.611	24	–	12	.667
Toledo	10	–	8	.556	18	–	15	.545
Ohio	10	–	8	.556	16	–	16	.500
Western Michigan	9	–	9	.500	12	–	20	.375
Eastern Michigan	9	–	9	.500	16	–	16	.500
Bowling Green	8	–	10	.444	14	–	18	.438
Ball State	7	–	11	.389	14	–	17	.452
Central Michigan	7	–	11	.389	14	–	17	.452
Buffalo	4	–	14	.222	9	–	22	.290
Northern Illinois	2	–	16	.111	6	–	25	.194
† 2025 MAC tournament winner

2024–25 MEAC men's basketball standings
	Conf.				Overall
Team	W		L	PCT	W		L	PCT
Norfolk State †	11	–	3	.786	24	–	11	.686
South Carolina State	11	–	3	.786	20	–	13	.606
Delaware State	8	–	6	.571	16	–	14	.533
Howard	7	–	7	.500	12	–	20	.375
Morgan State	7	–	7	.500	14	–	18	.438
North Carolina Central	6	–	8	.429	14	–	19	.424
Coppin State	4	–	10	.286	6	–	24	.200
Maryland Eastern Shore	2	–	12	.143	6	–	25	.194
† 2025 MEAC tournament winner

2024–25 Missouri Valley Conference men's basketball standings
	Conf.				Overall
Team	W		L	PCT	W		L	PCT
Drake †	17	–	3	.850	31	–	4	.886
Bradley	15	–	5	.750	28	–	9	.757
Northern Iowa	14	–	6	.700	20	–	13	.606
Belmont	13	–	7	.650	22	–	11	.667
Illinois State	10	–	10	.500	22	–	14	.611
UIC	10	–	10	.500	17	–	14	.548
Murray State	9	–	11	.450	16	–	17	.485
Southern Illinois	8	–	12	.400	14	–	19	.424
Indiana State	8	–	12	.400	14	–	18	.438
Evansville	8	–	12	.400	11	–	21	.344
Valparaiso	6	–	14	.300	15	–	19	.441
Missouri State	2	–	18	.100	9	–	23	.281
† 2025 MVC tournament winner

2024–25 Mountain West Conference men's basketball standings
	Conf.				Overall
Team	W		L	PCT	W		L	PCT
New Mexico	17	–	3	.850	27	–	8	.771
Colorado State †	16	–	4	.800	26	–	10	.722
Utah State	15	–	5	.750	26	–	8	.765
San Diego State	14	–	6	.700	21	–	10	.677
Boise State	14	–	6	.700	26	–	11	.703
UNLV	11	–	9	.550	18	–	15	.545
Nevada	8	–	12	.400	17	–	16	.515
San Jose State	7	–	13	.350	15	–	20	.429
Wyoming	5	–	15	.250	12	–	20	.375
Fresno State	2	–	18	.100	6	–	26	.188
Air Force	1	–	19	.050	4	–	28	.125
† 2025 Mountain West tournament winner

2024–25 Northeast Conference men's basketball standings
	Conf.				Overall
Team	W		L	PCT	W		L	PCT
Central Connecticut	14	–	2	.875	25	–	7	.781
LIU	12	–	4	.750	17	–	16	.515
Mercyhurst **	9	–	7	.563	15	–	16	.484
Saint Francis †	8	–	8	.500	16	–	18	.471
Fairleigh Dickinson	8	–	8	.500	13	–	20	.394
Stonehill *	7	–	9	.438	15	–	17	.469
Wagner	6	–	10	.375	14	–	16	.467
Chicago State	4	–	12	.250	4	–	28	.125
Le Moyne *	4	–	12	.250	9	–	23	.281
† 2025 NEC tournament winner * ineligible for the 2025 NCAA tournament due to transition from Division II ** ineligible for both the 2025 NEC tournament and the 2025 NCAA tournament due to transition from Division II

2024–25 Ohio Valley Conference men's basketball standings
	Conf.				Overall
Team	W		L	PCT	W		L	PCT
Southeast Missouri State	15	–	5	.750	21	–	12	.636
SIU Edwardsville †	13	–	7	.650	22	–	12	.647
Tennessee State	12	–	8	.600	17	–	16	.515
Little Rock	12	–	8	.600	19	–	14	.576
Tennessee Tech	10	–	10	.500	15	–	17	.469
Lindenwood*	10	–	10	.500	16	–	17	.485
Morehead State	10	–	10	.500	15	–	17	.469
UT Martin	9	–	11	.450	14	–	19	.424
Eastern Illinois	8	–	12	.400	12	–	19	.387
Western Illinois	6	–	14	.300	12	–	19	.387
Southern Indiana*	5	–	15	.250	10	–	20	.333
† 2025 OVC tournament winner * ineligible for the 2025 NCAA tournament due to transition period

2024–25 Patriot League men's basketball standings
	Conf.				Overall
Team	W		L	PCT	W		L	PCT
Bucknell	13	–	5	.722	18	–	15	.545
American †	13	–	5	.722	22	–	13	.629
Colgate	10	–	8	.556	14	–	19	.424
Boston University	10	–	8	.556	16	–	16	.500
Navy	10	–	8	.556	15	–	19	.441
Army	10	–	8	.556	17	–	16	.515
Lafayette	7	–	11	.389	13	–	20	.394
Loyola	6	–	12	.333	12	–	19	.387
Lehigh	6	–	12	.333	11	–	19	.367
Holy Cross	5	–	13	.278	13	–	19	.406
† 2025 Patriot League tournament winner

2024–25 Southeastern Conference men's basketball standings
	Conf.				Overall
Team	W		L	PCT	W		L	PCT
No. 4 Auburn	15	–	3	.833	32	–	6	.842
No. 1 Florida †	14	–	4	.778	36	–	4	.900
No. 6 Alabama	13	–	5	.722	28	–	9	.757
No. 5 Tennessee	12	–	6	.667	30	–	8	.789
No. 19 Texas A&M	11	–	7	.611	23	–	11	.676
No. 12 Kentucky	10	–	8	.556	24	–	12	.667
Missouri	10	–	8	.556	22	–	12	.647
No. 18 Ole Miss	10	–	8	.556	24	–	12	.667
No. 20 Arkansas	8	–	10	.444	22	–	14	.611
Mississippi State	8	–	10	.444	21	–	13	.618
Georgia	8	–	10	.444	20	–	13	.606
Vanderbilt	8	–	10	.444	20	–	13	.606
Texas	6	–	12	.333	19	–	16	.543
Oklahoma	6	–	12	.333	20	–	14	.588
LSU	3	–	15	.167	14	–	18	.438
South Carolina	2	–	16	.111	12	–	20	.375
† 2025 SEC tournament winner Rankings from AP poll

2024–25 SWAC men's basketball standings
	Conf.				Overall
Team	W		L	PCT	W		L	PCT
Southern	15	–	3	.833	20	–	12	.625
Jackson State	14	–	4	.778	16	–	18	.471
Bethune–Cookman	13	–	5	.722	17	–	16	.515
Texas Southern	12	–	6	.667	15	–	17	.469
Alabama State †	12	–	6	.667	20	–	16	.556
Alcorn State	11	–	7	.611	11	–	21	.344
Florida A&M	10	–	8	.556	14	–	17	.452
Grambling State	7	–	11	.389	12	–	22	.353
Alabama A&M	6	–	12	.333	10	–	22	.313
Prairie View A&M	4	–	14	.222	5	–	27	.156
Arkansas–Pine Bluff	3	–	15	.167	6	–	25	.194
Mississippi Valley State	1	–	17	.056	3	–	28	.097
† 2025 SWAC tournament winner

2024–25 Southern Conference men's basketball standings
	Conf.				Overall
Team	W		L	PCT	W		L	PCT
Chattanooga	15	–	3	.833	29	–	9	.763
UNC Greensboro	13	–	5	.722	20	–	12	.625
East Tennessee State	12	–	6	.667	19	–	13	.594
Samford	12	–	6	.667	22	–	11	.667
Furman	11	–	7	.611	25	–	10	.714
Wofford †	10	–	8	.556	19	–	16	.543
VMI	7	–	11	.389	15	–	19	.441
Mercer	6	–	12	.333	14	–	19	.424
Western Carolina	4	–	14	.222	8	–	22	.267
The Citadel	0	–	18	.000	5	–	25	.167
† 2025 SoCon tournament winner

2024–25 Southland Conference men's basketball standings
	Conf.				Overall
Team	W		L	PCT	W		L	PCT
McNeese †	19	–	1	.950	28	–	7	.800
Lamar	14	–	6	.700	20	–	13	.606
Nicholls	13	–	7	.650	20	–	13	.606
Northwestern State	12	–	8	.600	16	–	16	.500
Texas A&M–Corpus Christi	12	–	8	.600	20	–	14	.588
Southeastern Louisiana	12	–	8	.600	18	–	14	.563
Incarnate Word	9	–	11	.450	19	–	17	.528
Houston Christian	9	–	11	.450	12	–	20	.375
UT Rio Grande Valley	8	–	12	.400	16	–	15	.516
Stephen F. Austin	7	–	13	.350	14	–	17	.452
East Texas A&M*	3	–	17	.150	5	–	26	.161
New Orleans	2	–	18	.100	4	–	27	.129
† 2025 Southland tournament winner * ineligible for the 2025 NCAA tournament due to transition period

2024–25 Summit League men's basketball standings
	Conf.				Overall
Team	W		L	PCT	W		L	PCT
Omaha †	13	–	3	.813	22	–	13	.629
St. Thomas *	12	–	4	.750	24	–	10	.706
South Dakota State	11	–	5	.688	20	–	12	.625
North Dakota State	10	–	6	.625	21	–	11	.656
South Dakota	9	–	7	.563	19	–	14	.576
North Dakota	5	–	11	.313	12	–	21	.364
Denver	5	–	11	.313	11	–	21	.344
Kansas City	4	–	12	.250	13	–	20	.394
Oral Roberts	3	–	13	.188	7	–	23	.233
† 2025 Summit League tournament winner * Ineligible for the 2025 NCAA tournament due to transition from Division III

2024–25 Sun Belt Conference men's basketball standings
	Conf.				Overall
Team	W		L	PCT	W		L	PCT
South Alabama	13	–	5	.722	21	–	11	.656
James Madison	13	–	5	.722	20	–	12	.625
Troy †	13	–	5	.722	23	–	11	.676
Arkansas State	13	–	5	.722	25	–	11	.694
Marshall	12	–	6	.667	20	–	13	.606
Appalachian State	10	–	8	.556	17	–	14	.548
Texas State	9	–	9	.500	16	–	16	.500
Georgia State	8	–	10	.444	14	–	19	.424
Georgia Southern	8	–	10	.444	17	–	16	.515
Old Dominion	8	–	10	.444	15	–	20	.429
Louisiana	8	–	10	.444	12	–	21	.364
Southern Miss	5	–	13	.278	11	–	22	.333
Coastal Carolina	3	–	15	.167	10	–	22	.313
Louisiana–Monroe	3	–	15	.167	7	–	25	.219
† 2025 Sun Belt tournament winner

2024–25 WAC men's basketball standings
	Conf.				Overall
Team	W		L	PCT	W		L	PCT
Utah Valley	15	–	1	.938	25	–	9	.735
Grand Canyon †	13	–	3	.813	26	–	8	.765
California Baptist	9	–	7	.563	17	–	15	.531
Abilene Christian	8	–	8	.500	16	–	16	.500
Seattle	8	–	8	.500	14	–	18	.438
Tarleton State	7	–	9	.438	12	–	20	.375
UT Arlington	6	–	10	.375	13	–	18	.419
Southern Utah	4	–	12	.250	12	–	19	.387
Utah Tech	2	–	14	.125	7	–	26	.212
† 2025 WAC tournament winner

2024–25 West Coast Conference men's basketball standings
	Conf.				Overall
Team	W		L	PCT	W		L	PCT
No. 24 Saint Mary's	17	–	1	.944	29	–	6	.829
No. 23 Gonzaga †	14	–	4	.778	26	–	9	.743
San Francisco	13	–	5	.722	25	–	10	.714
Santa Clara	12	–	6	.667	21	–	13	.618
Oregon State	10	–	8	.556	20	–	13	.606
Washington State	8	–	10	.444	19	–	15	.559
Loyola Marymount	8	–	10	.444	17	–	15	.531
Portland	7	–	11	.389	12	–	20	.375
Pepperdine	4	–	14	.222	13	–	22	.371
Pacific	4	–	14	.222	9	–	24	.273
San Diego	2	–	16	.111	6	–	27	.182
† 2025 WCC tournament winner Rankings from AP poll

== Award winners ==
=== 2025 Consensus All-Americans ===
Consensus First Team
Player	Position	Class	Team
Johni Broome	PF/C	Graduate	Auburn
Walter Clayton Jr.	PG/SG	Senior	Florida
Cooper Flagg	SF	Freshman	Duke
Mark Sears	PG	Graduate	Alabama
Braden Smith	PG	Junior	Purdue

Consensus Second Team
Player	Position	Class	Team
PJ Haggerty	SG	Sophomore	Memphis
Kam Jones	PG/SG	Senior	Marquette
RJ Luis Jr.	SF	Junior	St. John's
John Tonje	SG	Graduate	Wisconsin
JT Toppin	PF	Sophomore	Texas Tech

=== Major player of the year awards ===
- Wooden Award: Cooper Flagg, Duke
- Naismith Award: Cooper Flagg, Duke
- Associated Press Player of the Year: Cooper Flagg, Duke
- NABC Player of the Year: Cooper Flagg, Duke
- Oscar Robertson Trophy (USBWA): Cooper Flagg, Duke
- Sporting News Player of the Year: Johni Broome, Auburn
- Lute Olson Award (Collegeinsider.com): Cooper Flagg, Duke

=== Major freshman of the year awards ===
- Wayman Tisdale Award (USBWA): Cooper Flagg, Duke
- NABC Freshman of the Year: Cooper Flagg, Duke

=== Major coach of the year awards ===
- Associated Press Coach of the Year: Bruce Pearl, Auburn & Rick Pitino, St. John's
- Henry Iba Award (USBWA): Rick Pitino, St. John's
- NABC Coach of the Year: Bruce Pearl, Auburn
- Naismith College Coach of the Year: Rick Pitino, St. John's
- Sporting News Coach of the Year: Kelvin Sampson, Houston
- Jim Phelan Award (Collegeinsider.com): Chris Beard, Ole Miss

=== Other major awards ===
- Naismith Starting Five:
  - Bob Cousy Award (best point guard): Braden Smith, Purdue
  - Jerry West Award (best shooting guard): Chaz Lanier, Tennessee
  - Julius Erving Award (best small forward): Cooper Flagg, Duke
  - Karl Malone Award (best power forward): Johni Broome, Auburn
  - Kareem Abdul-Jabbar Award (best center): Ryan Kalkbrenner, Creighton
- Pete Newell Big Man Award (best big man): Johni Broome, Auburn
- NABC Defensive Player of the Year: Ryan Kalkbrenner, Creighton
- Naismith Defensive Player of the Year: Ryan Kalkbrenner, Creighton
- Robert V. Geasey Trophy (top player in Philadelphia Big 5): Eric Dixon, Villanova
- Haggerty Award (top player in NYC metro area): RJ Luis Jr., St. John's
- Ben Jobe Award (top minority coach): Chris Crutchfield, Omaha
- Hugh Durham Award (top mid-major coach): John Groce, Akron
- Lefty Driesell Award (top defensive player): Joseph Tugler, Houston
- Lou Henson Award (top mid-major player): Brian Moore Jr., Norfolk State
- Skip Prosser Man of the Year Award (coach with moral character): Mark Byington, Vanderbilt
- Academic All-American of the Year (top scholar-athlete): RJ Luis Jr., St. John's
- Elite 90 Award (top GPA among upperclass players at Final Four): Bennett Andersen, Florida
- Perry Wallace Most Courageous Award: For the first time in nearly 50 years, this award and its corresponding women's award were not presented to college basketball figures. The awards went to the boys' and girls' teams of Palisades Charter High School in Los Angeles, which both posted winning seasons in the wake of the wildfire that destroyed much of the campus as well as the homes of multiple players on both teams.

== Coaching changes ==
Many teams will change coaches during the season and after it ends.

Team	Former	Interim	New	Reason
Alabama A&M	Otis Hughley Jr.	—N/a	Donte Jackson	Hughley resigned from AAMU on March 25, 2025 after three seasons and a 37–63 record. Staying in the SWAC, the Bulldogs hired Grambling State head coach Jackson on April 3.
Alcorn State	Landon Bussie	—N/a	Jake Morton	Bussie left Alcorn State on March 20, 2025 after five seasons for Chicago State. Morton, most recently assistant coach with Florida State, was hired by the Braves on April 11.
Arkansas State	Bryan Hodgson	—N/a	Ryan Pannone	Hodgson left Arkansas State on March 24, 2025 after two seasons for the South Florida job. Alabama assistant coach Pannone was hired by the Red Wolves on March 30.
Bellarmine	Scott Davenport	—N/a	Doug Davenport	Scott Davenport announced his retirement on March 10, 2025 after 20 seasons at Bellarmine. He left the program as its winningest head coach with 426 wins, including winning the 2011 D-II national championship. Davenport's son and Knights top assistant Doug, who had been named the designated successor in 2022, was officially promoted the next day.
Bryant	Phil Martelli Jr.	—N/a	Jamion Christian	Martelli Jr. left Bryant on March 26, 2025, after two seasons for the VCU head coaching position. Christian, formerly head coach at Mount St. Mary's, Siena, George Washington, and currently serving as head coach of Pallacanestro Trieste in Italy, was hired by the Bulldogs on April 3.
Campbell	Kevin McGeehan	—N/a	John Andrzejek	Campbell announced on March 9, 2025 that it had not renewed McGeehan's contract after 12 seasons and a 184–199 record. Florida assistant coach Andrzejek was hired by the Fighting Camels on March 20, and was introduced at the conclusion of Florida's season.
Central Michigan	Tony Barbee	—N/a	Andy Bronkema	CMU fired Barbee on April 3, 2025, after a 49–75 record in four seasons. Bronkema, head coach at Division II Ferris State the last 12 years, was hired by the Chippewas on April 14.
Chicago State	Scott Spinelli	—N/a	Landon Bussie	Less than 11 months after promoting Spinelli to head coach, Chicago State fired him after a 4–28 season on March 7, 2025. The Cougars hired Alcorn State head coach Bussie on March 20.
Cleveland State	Daniyal Robinson	—N/a	Rob Summers	Robinson left Cleveland State on March 30, 2025, after three seasons for the North Texas job. Missouri assistant coach Summers, who was an assistant with the Vikings from 2019–22, was hired on April 9.
Colorado State	Niko Medved	—N/a	Ali Farokhmanesh	Medved left Colorado State on March 24, 2025 after seven seasons for his alma mater Minnesota. Two days later, the Rams promoted associate head coach Farokhmanesh to fill the position.
Columbia	Jim Engles	—N/a	Kevin Hovde	Engles stepped down from his head coaching role on March 10, 2025 after eight seasons and a 71–150 record. Florida assistant coach Hovde, a former assistant with the Lions from 2012–2016, was hired on March 24.
Denver	Jeff Wulbrun	—N/a	Tim Bergstraser	Denver and Wulbrun, who was on leave through the end of the season, mutually agreed to part ways on March 20, 2025 after four seasons and a 53–74 record. Division II Minnesota State–Moorhead head coach Bergstraser was hired by the Pioneers on April 14.
Drake	Ben McCollum	—N/a	Eric Henderson	After leading Drake to 30+ wins in his lone season, McCollum left on March 24, 2025 for the Iowa coaching job. Four days later, the Bulldogs hired South Dakota State head coach Henderson.
Florida A&M	Patrick Crarey II	—N/a	Charlie Ward	Just less than a year after being hired by FAMU, Crarey departed from the university on April 11, 2025 to take the head coaching position at conference rival Grambling State. Ward, a former Heisman Trophy winner at Florida State and 12–year NBA veteran who was serving as head coach at Florida High School in Tallahassee, was hired by the Rattlers as his replacement on April 16.
Florida State	Leonard Hamilton	—N/a	Luke Loucks	Hamilton announced on February 3, 2025 that he would resign from FSU following the end of the 2024–25 season. He spent 23 years as head coach and resigned as the winningest coach in the program's history with 460 wins. Sacramento Kings assistant coach Loucks, who played for the Seminoles from 2008–2012 under Hamilton, was hired as his replacement on March 9.
Fordham	Keith Urgo	—N/a	Mike Magpayo	Fordham parted ways with Urgo on March 20, 2025 after three seasons, including winning just 25 games the last 2 years after winning that same number of games in his first season. On March 29, the Rams announced the hiring of UC Riverside head coach Magpayo.
Grambling State	Donte Jackson	—N/a	Patrick Crarey II	Jackson left Grambling on April 3, 2025, after eight seasons for conference rival Alabama A&M. The Tigers would also stay in conference for their new head coach, hiring Florida A&M head coach Crarey on April 11.
High Point	Alan Huss	—N/a	Flynn Clayman	Huss left High Point on April 10, 2025, after two seasons to return to his alma mater Creighton to become associate head coach and head coach in waiting. Panthers associate head coach Clayman was promoted to the open position the following day.
Indiana	Mike Woodson	—N/a	Darian DeVries	Indiana announced on February 7, 2025 that Woodson would step down from his head coaching position after 4 seasons, effective at the end of the season. Under Woodson, the Hoosiers were 82–53 overall with back-to-back appearances in the NCAA Tournament during Woodson's first 2 seasons. On March 18, 2025, the school announced that former West Virginia head coach Darian DeVries would be hired as his replacement.
Iona	Tobin Anderson	—N/a	Dan Geriot	Iona fired Anderson after 2 seasons and a 33–34 record on March 17, 2025. New Orleans Pelicans assistant coach Geriot was hired by the Gaels as his replacement three days later.
Iowa	Fran McCaffery	—N/a	Ben McCollum	Iowa fired McCaffery on March 14, 2025 after 15 seasons. McCaffery led the Hawkeyes to a program record 297 wins and 7 NCAA tournament appearances, but failed to make the NCAA Tournament for the second straight year, the third time under his tenure. Drake head coach McCollum was hired on March 24.
IU Indy	Paul Corsaro	—N/a	Ben Howlett	Following an investigation into allegations of mistreatment within the IUI men's program, Corsaro was fired on May 13, 2025, after a single season. Howlett, head coach of his alma mater West Liberty of the NCAA Division II for the last eight seasons, was hired by the Jaguars on May 27.
La Salle	Fran Dunphy	—N/a	Darris Nichols	Dunphy, who was in his 3rd season as head coach of La Salle, announced on February 20, 2025 that he would retire from his position at the end of the season, but would remain with his alma mater as special assistant to the president of the university, for which he agreed to a lifetime contract for that role. On March 11, the Explorers hired Radford head coach Nichols as his replacement.
Lipscomb	Lennie Acuff	—N/a	Kevin Carroll	Acuff left Lipscomb on April 9, 2025, after six seasons for the same position at Samford. Former Bison assistant Carroll, who had been head coach at Division II Trevecca Nazarene University the past two years, was hired on April 15.
Longwood	Griff Aldrich	—N/a	Ronnie Thomas	After Aldrich left Longwood after seven seasons to become associate head coach at Virginia, Lancers assistant Thomas was named head coach on March 23, 2025.
Louisiana	Bob Marlin	Derrick Zimmerman	Quannas White	Louisiana announced on December 19, 2024, that Marlin was relieved of his duties and assistant coach Zimmerman would serve as the team's interim head coach for the remainder of the season. Marlin finished with a record of 269–198 and two NCAA tournament appearances during his 14-plus-year tenure with the Ragin' Cajuns. On March 10, 2025, Houston assistant coach White was hired as the new head coach.
Louisiana–Monroe	Keith Richard	—N/a	Phil Cunningham	Richard announced on December 20, 2024 that he would retire at the end of the season, his 15th at ULM. His 170 wins as head coach of ULM is the 2nd highest all-time in the program. Warhawks top assistant Cunningham was promoted to fill the vacant position on March 18, 2025.
Maryland	Kevin Willard	—N/a	Buzz Williams	Willard left Maryland after 3 seasons to accept Villanova's head coaching job on March 30, 2025. On April 1, the Terrapins announced the hiring of Buzz Williams from Texas A&M.
McNeese	Will Wade	—N/a	Bill Armstrong	Wade left McNeese on March 23, 2025 after two seasons for NC State. Baylor assistant coach Armstrong was hired by the Cowboys on March 25.
Miami (FL)	Jim Larrañaga	Bill Courtney	Jai Lucas	On December 26, 2024, Larrañaga announced he would step down as head coach of Miami, effective immediately. Larrañaga coached 15 years at Miami finishing with an overall record of 274–174, the winningest record in Hurricanes basketball history. He appeared in six NCAA tournaments with the Hurricanes, as well as one Final Four in 2023. Hurricanes associate head coach Courtney was announced as the interim head coach for the remainder of the season. On March 6, 2025, the school announced the hiring of Duke associate head coach Lucas as the new head coach.
Minnesota	Ben Johnson	—N/a	Niko Medved	Minnesota fired Johnson on March 13, 2025 after 4 seasons. Under Johnson, the Golden Gophers were 56–71 overall, including a 22–57 record in conference play and never finished higher than 9th in the standings. Colorado State head coach and Minnesota alum Medved was hired on March 24.
Murray State	Steve Prohm	—N/a	Ryan Miller	Unable to replicate the success from his first time at Murray State, Prohm stepped down from his head coaching position on March 8, 2025 after a 45–52 record in three seasons of his second stint. Creighton top assistant Miller was hired by the Racers on March 17.
Navy	Ed DeChellis	—N/a	Jon Perry	After 14 seasons at Navy and 29 overall as head coach, DeChellis announced his retirement on March 19, 2025. DeChellis won 196 games with the Midshipmen and coached the most games in program history with 426. Associate head coach Perry was promoted to the position on April 2.
NC State	Kevin Keatts	—N/a	Will Wade	Keatts was fired on March 9, 2025 after eight seasons at NC State. Under Keatts, the Wolfpack went 151–113, including finishing 12–19 this year and missing the conference tournament less than a year after making the Final Four. McNeese head coach Wade was officially hired as his replacement on March 23.
New Mexico	Richard Pitino	—N/a	Eric Olen	Pitino departed from UNM on March 25, 2025 after four seasons for Xavier. UC San Diego's Eric Olen was tabbed as the Lobos new head coach on March 30.
North Florida	Matthew Driscoll	Bobby Kennen		Driscoll left UNF on May 22, 2025, after 16 seasons to become associate head coach at Kansas State. On that same day, longtime Ospreys associate head coach Kennen was initially named interim head coach for the 2025–26 season. On March 7, 2026, Kennen had the interim tag removed and was officially named head coach.
North Texas	Ross Hodge	—N/a	Daniyal Robinson	It was announced on March 26, 2025, that Hodge will leave UNT after two seasons for the West Virginia job once the Mean Green's season is over. Cleveland State head coach Robinson was hired to be his replacement on March 30.
Oral Roberts	Russell Springmann	—N/a	Kory Barnett	ORU fired Springmann on March 7, 2025 after two seasons and a 19–42 record. The Golden Eagles hired West Virginia assistant Barnett on March 28.
Penn	Steve Donahue	—N/a	Fran McCaffery	Penn parted ways with Donahue on March 10, 2025 after nine seasons and a 131–130 record. Former Iowa Head coach and Penn alum McCaffery was hired by the Quakers on March 27.
Radford	Darris Nichols	—N/a	Zach Chu	Nichols left Radford after four seasons on March 11, 2025 for the La Salle job. Chu, the chief strategist for SMU, was hired by the Highlanders on March 16.
Saint Francis	Rob Krimmel	—N/a	Luke McConnell	Krimmel announced his retirement from Saint Francis after 13 seasons on March 27, 2025, two days after the school announced that they will be moving to Division 3 in 2026. Red Flash associate head coach McConnell was immediately promoted to the position the same day.
Samford	Bucky McMillan	—N/a	Lennie Acuff	McMillan left Samford after five seasons on April 5, 2025 for the Texas A&M job. Four days later, the Bulldogs hired Lipscomb head coach Acuff as his replacement.
South Dakota State	Eric Henderson	—N/a	Bryan Petersen	Henderson left SDSU on March 28, 2025, after six seasons for Drake. The Jackrabbits promoted top assistant Peterson the following day.
South Florida	Amir Abdur-Rahim	Ben Fletcher	Bryan Hodgson	The 43-year-old Abdur-Rahim died on October 24, 2024, just 11 days before beginning his second season as South Florida head coach, following complications during a medical procedure at a Tampa hospital. In his first and only season at USF, he led the Bulls to a school-record 25 wins, an American Athletic Conference regular season championship, and was named AAC Coach of the Year. Five days after his death, associate head coach Fletcher was named interim head coach for the season. Following the season, USF announced on March 14, 2025 that Fletcher would not be retained. On March 24, the school hired Arkansas State head coach Hodgson.
Stephen F. Austin	Kyle Keller	Tony Jasick	Matt Braeuer	SFA relieved Keller from his duties on January 22, 2025 after 8+ seasons. Under Keller, the Lumberjacks were 171–95 overall but had started this season 8–11, including a 1–7 record in conference play. Associate head coach Jasick was named interim head coach for the remainder of the season. On March 7, Texas Tech assistant coach Braeuer was hired as the new head coach.
Tennessee State	Brian Collins	—N/a	Nolan Smith	Collins left Tennessee State on June 30, 2025, after seven seasons to join the Memphis Grizzlies as a player development coach. Memphis assistant coach Smith was hired by the Tigers on July 18.
Texas	Rodney Terry	—N/a	Sean Miller	Texas parted ways with Terry on March 23, 2025. After leading the Longhorns to the 2023 Elite Eight as interim coach, the team went 40–29 in his two full seasons as head coach and were unable to get past the round of 32 both those years. The following day, the school hired Sean Miller from Xavier, whose team beat Texas in the First Four.
Texas A&M	Buzz Williams	—N/a	Bucky McMillan	Williams left Texas A&M on April 1, 2025, after six seasons for the Maryland head coaching position. On April 5, the Aggies announced former Samford head coach Bucky McMillan as his replacement.
UC Riverside	Mike Magpayo	—N/a	Gus Argenal	Magpayo left UCR on March 29, 2025, after five seasons for the Fordham job. The Highlanders hired Argenal from Division II Cal State San Bernardino on May 1.
UC San Diego	Eric Olen	—N/a	Clint Allard	Olen departed UC San Diego on March 30, 2025, after 12 seasons to accept the New Mexico head coaching job. The same day, associate head coach Allard was appointed as the new head coach of the Tritons.
UNLV	Kevin Kruger	—N/a	Josh Pastner	UNLV fired Kruger on March 15, 2025 after four seasons and a 76–55 record. On March 24, former Memphis and Georgia Tech head coach Pastner was hired as the new head coach of the Runnin' Rebels.
Utah	Craig Smith	Josh Eilert	Alex Jensen	Utah announced on February 24, 2025 that Smith was relieved of his coaching duties and assistant coach Eilert would serve as the team's interim head coach for the remainder of the season. Smith finished with a 65−62 with zero NCAA tournament appearances during his 3+ year tenure with the Utes. On March 6, Dallas Mavericks assistant coach Jensen, a member of the 1998 national championship runner-up team, was announced as the new head coach.
VCU	Ryan Odom	—N/a	Phil Martelli Jr.	Odom left VCU on March 21, 2025 after two seasons for the Virginia job. Five days later, the Rams hired Bryant head coach Phil Martelli Jr. as his replacement.
Villanova	Kyle Neptune	Mike Nardi	Kevin Willard	Villanova dismissed Neptune on March 15, 2025 after 3 seasons and a 54–47 record with no NCAA tournament appearances. Wildcats associate head coach Nardi, who was named interim head coach following Neptune's dismissal, will continue to serve in that role for the team in the inaugural College Basketball Crown. On March 30, Maryland head coach Kevin Willard accepted the offer to be Villanova's next head coach.
Virginia	Tony Bennett	Ron Sanchez	Ryan Odom	Virginia announced on October 17, 2024 that Bennett had retired, effective immediately, and made a formal announcement the next day. Bennett left the Cavaliers after 15 seasons as the winningest head coach of the program with 364 wins, 10 NCAA tournament appearances, 6 ACC regular-season titles, 2 ACC tournament championships, and a national title in 2019. Associate head coach Sanchez, who rejoined the staff last season after spending the past five seasons as Charlotte head coach, was named interim head coach for the season. After a 15–17 season, UVA announced on March 12, 2025 that Sanchez would not be retained for next season. On March 21, Virginia announced that VCU head coach Ryan Odom would be its new coach.
West Virginia	Darian DeVries	—N/a	Ross Hodge	DeVries left West Virginia on March 18, 2025 after a single season for the Indiana job. The Mountaineers hired North Texas head coach Hodge, and will be formally introduced at the end of UNT's season.
Xavier	Sean Miller	—N/a	Richard Pitino	Miller, who just finished his third season of his second stint at Xavier, left on March 24, 2025 for the head coaching job at Texas. New Mexico head coach Pitino was hired by the Musketeers the following day.

== Attendances ==
The top 30 NCAA Division I men's basketball teams by average home attendance:

Attendance
Ranking	Team	Average attendance	Total attendance
1	North Carolina	20,521	307,821
2	Kentucky	20,334	366,007
3	Tennessee	20,026	340,436
4	Arkansas	18,996	341,935
5	Syracuse	18,888	321,103
6	Creighton	17,366	295,217
7	BYU	17,054	289,921
8	Indiana	16,447	296,046
9	Marquette	15,571	264,705
10	Kansas	15,300	260,100
11	Illinois	15,091	256,543
12	Wisconsin	15,006	255,109
13	Nebraska	14,964	239,426
14	Purdue	14,876	238,016
15	Louisville	14,864	252,681
16	Michigan State	14,797	236,752
17	Iowa State	14,062	239,053
18	Arizona	14,058	224,925
19	Virginia	13,478	229,133
20	Dayton	13,407	241,328
21	Alabama	13,389	200,834
22	Maryland	13,367	253,972
23	NC State	13,063	235,140
24	New Mexico	13,051	221,866
25	Texas Tech	13,042	234,752
26	UConn	12,992	207,864
27	Michigan	12,007	192,105
28	Memphis	11,931	178,958
29	South Carolina	11,926	214,673
30	Missouri	11,713	234,251

== See also ==
- 2024–25 NCAA Division I women's basketball season
