= Braden Smith (basketball) =

American basketball player (born 2003)

No. 3 – Indiana Pacers
- Position: Point guard
- League: NBA

Personal information
- Born: July 25, 2003 (age 23) Russellville, Arkansas, U.S.
- Listed height: 5 ft 11 in (1.80 m)
- Listed weight: 170 lb (77 kg)

Career information
- High school: Westfield (Westfield, Indiana)
- College: Purdue (2022–2026)
- NBA draft: 2026: 2nd round, 38th overall pick
- Drafted by: Chicago Bulls
- Playing career: 2026–present

Career history
- 2026–present: Indiana Pacers
- 2026–present: →Noblesville Boom

Career highlights
- 2× Consensus first-team All-American (2025, 2026); Bob Cousy Award (2025); Big Ten Player of the Year (2025); 3× First-team All-Big Ten (2024–2026); Big Ten All-Freshman Team (2023); Big Ten Tournament MVP (2026); Indiana Mr. Basketball (2022)
- Stats at NBA.com
- Stats at Basketball Reference

Braden Lee Smith (born July 25, 2003) is an American professional basketball player for the Indiana Pacers of the National Basketball Association (NBA), on a two-way contract with the Noblesville Boom of the NBA G League. He played college basketball for the Purdue Boilermakers. He is the NCAA Division I men's basketball all-time career assist leader.

== Early life and high school career ==
Smith was born in Russellville, Arkansas, and moved with his family to Westfield, Indiana, at age four. He attended Westfield High School and made the varsity basketball team as a freshman. Smith was named first-team All-Hoosier Crossroads Conference (HCC) after he averaged 18.5 points, 5.4 rebounds, 4.7 assists, and 1.5 steals per game during his sophomore season. As a junior, he averaged 22.1 points, 6.2 rebounds, 5.4 assists, and 2.7 steals per game and was named high-honorable mention All-State in addition to repeating as a first team All-HCC selection. Smith was named Indiana Mr. Basketball after averaging 18.3 points, six rebounds, six assists, and 1.9 steals while leading Westfield to their first sectional championship. He also missed several weeks due to a foot injury.

Smith was rated a three-star recruit and committed to playing college basketball for Purdue over offers from Appalachian State, Belmont, Montana, North Texas, and Toledo. At the time of his commitment Purdue was his only major-conference offer, but he had recently begun to receive interest from Indiana, Gonzaga, Xavier, Villanova, and Oregon.

== College career ==
=== Freshman season ===
Smith entered his freshman season at Purdue as a starter at guard. In his college debut in the season opener against Milwaukee, he scored seven points with four rebounds, four assists and set a freshman record with seven steals in an 84–57 win. Smith was named the Big Ten Conference Freshman of the Week after scoring 20 points with three assists and two rebounds in a 75–70 win over Marquette. He started all 35 of the Boilermakers' games and was named to the Big Ten Conference All-Freshman team after averaging 9.7 points, 4.4 assists, 4.2 rebounds, and 1.2 steals per game. Purdue won the 2022–23 Big Ten Conference men's basketball regular season championship (the school's 25th) as well as the 2023 Big Ten men's basketball tournament.

No. 1-seeded Purdue lost to 23.5 point underdog No. 16-seeded Fairleigh Dickinson in its 2023 NCAA Division I men's basketball tournament first-round game in Columbus, the biggest upset in tournament history. The freshman backcourt of Smith and Fletcher Loyer had 10 turnovers. The backcourt pair of Smith and Loyer each started a school freshman record 35 games and finished the season as Purdue's 2nd highest scoring freshman duo (Loyer 384/Smith 340, 724 total) behind Robbie Hummel and E'Twaun Moore (813, 2008).

=== Sophomore season ===
Smith returned as the starting Point Guard in his sophomore season. On March 5, in a win against Illinois, Smith broke the Purdue single season assist record with his 208th assist. The previous record, set by Bruce Parkinson, had stood since 1975. Purdue clinched a second consecutive Big Ten regular season Championship with a March 2 victory over Michigan State as Smith contributed 23 points and 9 rebounds. On March 12, Smith was named first-team All-Big Ten. By the end of the season Braden Smith led the nation in total assists and was named an Honorable Mention All-American. In the Sweet Sixteen vs Gonzaga, Braden Smith had 14 points and 15 assists in Purdue's victory. Smith's 15 assists were the most by one player in a tournament game in Purdue history as well as in Big Ten history (tied with Mike Smith). In the National Championship game, Smith broke the Big Ten single season assist record with his 292nd assist narrowly passing the previous record holder, Cassius Winston, by one assist.

=== Junior season ===
Smith was a consensus 2025 NCAA Men's Basketball All-American.

=== Senior season ===
On his March 7 senior day against Wisconsin, Smith and Fletcher Loyer tied the school record for games played by Dakota Mathias (141). After losing 4 of its 6 final regular season games, Purdue won 4 in 4 days to capture the 2026 Big Ten men's basketball tournament with a victory over Michigan on March 15. Smith contributed 14 points, 11 assists and 3 steals in the victory. At the 2026 Big Ten men's basketball tournament, Smith established the Big Ten men's basketball tournament single-game (16), single tournament (46) and career (96) assists record. On March 20, Smith broke the NCAA Division I men's basketball all-time career assist record, previously held for 33 years by Bobby Hurley (1076), against the Queens Royals in the first round of the 2026 NCAA Tournament.

Smith finished his Purdue career with 1,103 assists (NCAA record), 5,067 minutes played (NCAA four-year career record, surpassing Lionel Simmons of La Salle 5,045; 1987–90), 1,932 points (8th in Purdue history), 249 steals (3rd in Purdue history) and 673 rebounds (17th in Purdue history). His 345 senior season assists the fifth in NCAA history. His senior class with Loyer and Trey Kaufman-Renn finished with a school record four-season win total of 117 (Only surpassed in Big Ten history by 2013 Ohio State - 123; 2014 Ohio State - 119).

== Professional career ==
On June 24, 2026, Smith was selected with the 38th overall pick in the 2026 NBA draft by the Chicago Bulls but was subsequently traded to the Indiana Pacers on draft night in exchange for Kam Jones. The Pacers signed him to a two-way contract, splitting his availability between the Indiana Pacers and the G League's Noblesville Boom. On November 2, the Pacers had 11 players sidelined opening the way for Smith to play his first meaningful minutes and make his first NBA start with only 6 players available to play. He posted 19 points on 8-13 shooting, had 10 assists, 4 rebounds and 3 steals against the Atlanta Hawks. Smith started 4 times before being assigned to the Noblesville Boom for a November 17 G League debut. In his debut he posted 14 assists with one turnover and 12 points in 155–131 loss to the Sioux Falls Skyforce. Many of his assists contributed to the season-high 31 points by Rienk Mast.

== Career statistics ==
Legend
GP	Games played	GS	Games started	MPG	Minutes per game
FG%	Field goal percentage	3P%	3-point field goal percentage	FT%	Free throw percentage
RPG	Rebounds per game	APG	Assists per game	SPG	Steals per game
BPG	Blocks per game	PPG	Points per game	**Bold**	Career high

=== College ===
Year	Team	GP	GS	MPG	FG%	3P%	FT%	RPG	APG	SPG	BPG	PPG
2022–23	Purdue	35	35	30.3	.438	.376	**.868**	4.2	4.4	1.2	**.2**	9.7
2023–24	Purdue	**39**	**39**	34.0	.441	**.431**	.795	**5.8**	7.5	1.6	.1	12.0
2024–25	Purdue	36	36	**37.0**	.428	.381	.833	4.5	8.7	**2.2**	**.2**	**15.8**
2025–26	Purdue	**39**	**39**	34.5	**.440**	.362	.825	3.5	**8.8**	1.7	**.2**	14.3
Career		149	149	34.0	.436	.385	.832	4.5	7.4	1.7	.2	13.0

== Personal life ==
Both of Smith's parents, Ginny and Dustin, played college basketball at Arkansas Tech University. Ginny Smith currently serves as the assistant athletic director and girls' basketball coach at Westfield High School.

Smith majored in Organizational Leadership at Purdue University.

== See also ==
- List of NCAA Division I men's basketball career assists leaders
