= Kam Jones =

American basketball player (born 2002)

No. 19 – Milwaukee Bucks
- Position: Point guard
- League: NBA

Personal information
- Born: February 25, 2002 (age 24) Colorado Springs, Colorado, U.S.
- Listed height: 6 ft 4 in (1.93 m)
- Listed weight: 200 lb (91 kg)

Career information
- High school: Evangelical Christian School (Cordova, Tennessee)
- College: Marquette (2021–2025)
- NBA draft: 2025: 2nd round, 38th overall pick
- Drafted by: San Antonio Spurs
- Playing career: 2025–present

Career history
- 2025–2026: Indiana Pacers
- 2025–2026: →Noblesville Boom
- 2026–present: Milwaukee Bucks
- 2026–present: →Wisconsin Herd

Career highlights
- Consensus second-team All-American (2025); First-team All-Big East (2025); Second-team All-Big East (2023); Big East All-Freshman team (2022)
- Stats at NBA.com
- Stats at Basketball Reference

Kam Jones is an American professional basketball player for the Milwaukee Bucks of the National Basketball Association (NBA), on a two-way contract with the Wisconsin Herd of the NBA G League. He played college basketball for the Marquette Golden Eagles.

== Early life and high school career ==
Jones grew up in Memphis, Tennessee and boxed in addition to playing basketball. He attended Evangelical Christian School, where he was coached by Willie Jenkins. Despite not being the most athletic player, Jones sometimes played at center to enhance his skills around the rim. He averaged 14.3 points, 4.2 rebounds and 3.3 assists per game as a sophomore and was named to the All-District team. As a junior, Jones averaged 19.1 points, 5.5 rebounds and 3.4 assists per game. Jones committed to playing college basketball for Marquette over offers from South Alabama and Florida.

== College career ==
Jones averaged 7.4 points per game as a freshman, earning Big East All-Freshman Team honors. As a sophomore, Jones averaged 15.1 points, 3.6 rebounds, and 1.4 steals per game. He was named to the Second Team All-Big East. In the NCAA Tournament, he scored 18 straight points in a 78–61 first round win against Vermont. As a junior, Jones averaged 17.2 points, 2.4 assists, 2.9 rebounds and 1.1 steals per game. He helped Marquette reach the Sweet 16 of the NCAA Tournament. As a senior, Jones averaged 19.2 points, 5.9 assists and 4.5 rebounds per game and was a consensus Second Team All-American.

== Professional career ==
=== Indiana Pacers / Noblesville Boom (2025–2026) ===
Jones was selected with the 38th pick in the 2025 NBA draft by the San Antonio Spurs, then traded to the Indiana Pacers. Jones made his professional debut for the Pacers' NBA G League affiliate, the Noblesville Boom, on December 19. He then made his NBA debut on December 22 against the Boston Celtics, scoring two points in one minute of action. Jones made 37 appearances (including seven starts) for Indiana during the 2025–26 NBA season, recording averages of 4.4 points, 1.6 rebounds, and 3.2 assists.

On June 24, 2026, Jones was traded to the Chicago Bulls in exchange for the draft rights of the 38th pick, Braden Smith, but was waived by the Bulls on June 30.

=== Milwaukee Bucks / Wisconsin Herd (2026–present) ===
On July 5, 2026, Jones signed a two-way contract with the Milwaukee Bucks.

== Personal life ==
On October 20, 2025, Jones was arrested after a four-mile (6.4 km) police chase, where Jones was reportedly going 90 mph (140 km/h) in a 55 mph (89 km/h) zone. Jones was charged with reckless driving and resisting law enforcement charges.

== Career statistics ==
Legend
GP	Games played	GS	Games started	MPG	Minutes per game
FG%	Field goal percentage	3P%	3-point field goal percentage	FT%	Free throw percentage
RPG	Rebounds per game	APG	Assists per game	SPG	Steals per game
BPG	Blocks per game	PPG	Points per game	**Bold**	Career high

=== NBA ===
Year	Team	GP	GS	MPG	FG%	3P%	FT%	RPG	APG	SPG	BPG	PPG
2025–26	Indiana	37	7	16.6	.402	.293	.500	1.6	3.2	.5	.0	4.4
Career		37	7	16.6	.402	.293	.500	1.6	3.2	.5	.0	4.4

=== College ===
Year	Team	GP	GS	MPG	FG%	3P%	FT%	RPG	APG	SPG	BPG	PPG
2021–22	Marquette	31	7	18.5	.415	.392	.611	1.4	1.2	.7	.1	7.4
2022–23	Marquette	**36**	**36**	29.8	.462	.360	.656	3.6	2.0	**1.4**	.1	15.1
2023–24	Marquette	**36**	**36**	29.1	**.501**	**.406**	**.724**	2.9	2.4	1.1	.1	17.2
2024–25	Marquette	34	34	**33.8**	.483	.311	.648	**4.5**	**5.9**	**1.4**	**.3**	**19.2**
Career		137	113	28.1	.475	.366	.671	3.1	2.9	1.2	.1	14.9
