= Mark Sears =

American basketball player (born 2002)

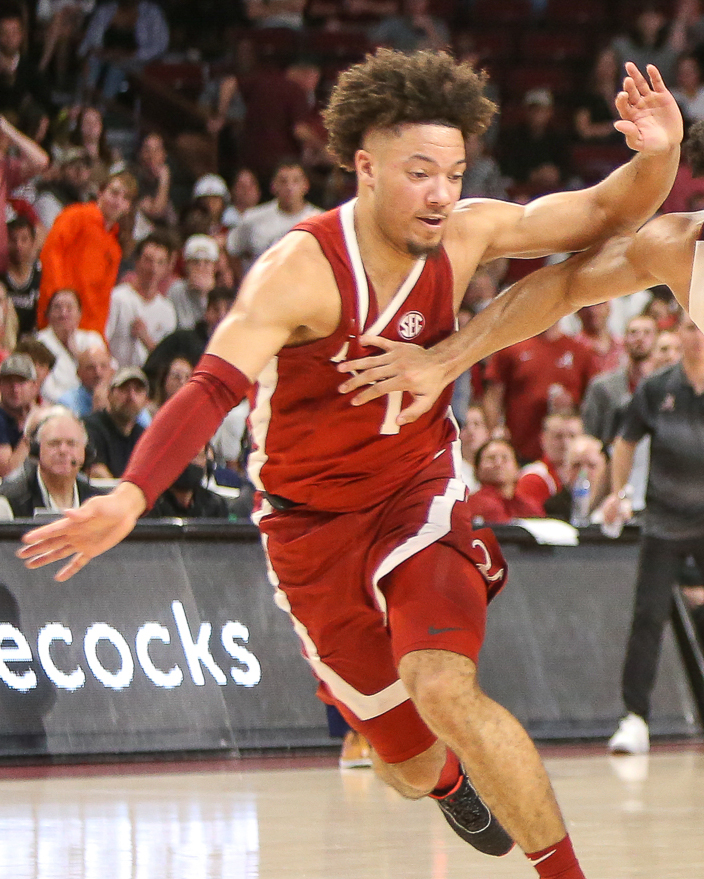
- Sears with Alabama in 2023

No. 19 – Rip City Remix
- Position: Point guard
- League: NBA G League

Personal information
- Born: February 19, 2002 (age 24) Muscle Shoals, Alabama, U.S.
- Listed height: 6 ft 0 in (1.83 m)
- Listed weight: 185 lb (84 kg)

Career information
- High school: Muscle Shoals (Muscle Shoals, Alabama); Hargrave Military Academy (Chatham, Virginia)
- College: Ohio (2020–2022); Alabama (2022–2025)
- NBA draft: 2025: undrafted
- Playing career: 2025–present

Career history
- 2025–2026: Milwaukee Bucks
- 2025–2026: →Wisconsin Herd
- 2026–present: Rip City Remix

Career highlights
- Consensus first-team All-American (2025); Consensus second-team All-American (2024); 2× First-team All-SEC (2024, 2025); Second-team All-SEC (2023); First-team All-MAC (2022); MAC All-Freshman Team (2021)
- Stats at NBA.com
- Stats at Basketball Reference

Mark Christopher Sears (born February 19, 2002) is an American professional basketball player for the Rip City Remix of the NBA G League. He played college basketball for the Ohio Bobcats and the Alabama Crimson Tide.

== Early life and high school career ==
Sears was born on February 19, 2002 in Muscle Shoals, Alabama. He began his career at Muscle Shoals High School where as a junior in February 2019, he recorded 31 points, 12 rebounds and five assists in a 64–52 win over Bessemer City High School in the Class 6A Northwest Regional championship. In 2019, he transferred to Hargrave Military Academy in Virginia. As a senior, Sears averaged 14 points, three assists and five rebounds per game and helped lead Hargrave to the Final 4 of the National Prep Championship with a 37–4 overall record. He committed to playing college basketball for Ohio.

== College career ==
=== Ohio ===
As a freshman, Sears came off the bench and began to see more minutes after Jason Preston was sidelined with a leg injury. Sears averaged 8.5 points, 2.8 rebounds and 3.4 assists per game, earning MAC All-Freshman Team honors. After Preston declared for the 2021 NBA draft following the season, Sears was named the team's starting point guard going into his sophomore season. In the offseason, he worked on improving his shooting by attempting 15,000 three-point shots. On December 21, 2021, Sears scored 33 points in an 85–70 win over USC Upstate. He scored a career-high 37 points on March 21, 2022, in a 91–86 loss to Abilene Christian in the College Basketball Invitational. Sears was named to the First Team All-MAC after the 2021–22 season. As a sophomore, he averaged 19.6 points, six rebounds and 4.1 assists per game. On March 30, 2022, Sears entered the transfer portal.

=== Alabama ===
On April 8, 2022, Sears announced that he had committed to Alabama. He averaged 12.5 points, 3.5 rebounds, 2.6 assists, and 1.2 steals per game, helping Alabama capture the 2023 SEC regular season and SEC Tournament titles. Alabama earned the number one overall seed in the 2023 NCAA Tournament and advanced to the Sweet 16. Sears was named to the Second Team All-SEC. Following the season, he declared for the 2023 NBA draft before returning to Alabama for his senior year. In his second season with the program, Sears averaged 21.5 points, 4.2 rebounds, 4.0 assists, and 1.6 steals per game, leading Alabama in scoring. Alabama earned a 4-seed in the West regional of the 2024 NCAA Tournament. In the regional final against Clemson, Sears scored 23 points on 7-14 shooting from the three-point line to help Alabama advance to its first Final Four in program history. Sears was voted to the First Team All-SEC and Second Team All-America teams. On May 29, 2024, Sears withdrew his name from the 2024 NBA draft to return to Alabama for his final year of collegiate eligibility. Alabama entered the 2024-25 season as the number 2-ranked team in the AP poll. Sears averaged 18.6 points, 2.9 rebounds, 5.1 assists, and 0.9 steals per game in his final season, leading the Crimson Tide in scoring and assists. In the Sweet 16 of the 2025 NCAA tournament, Sears scored 34 points on 10-16 shooting from three in Alabama's win over BYU, a game in which the Crimson Tide broke the NCAA tournament record for three pointers in a game with 25. Sears finished the season on the First Team All-SEC and First Team All-America teams. Sears finished his Alabama career as the program's second all-time leading scorer and ended his college career as a whole as the 19th all-time leading scorer in men's Division I history.

== Professional career ==
After not being selected in the 2025 NBA draft, Sears signed a two-way contract with the Milwaukee Bucks. He made seven appearances for Milwaukee, averaging 3.1 points, 0.3 rebounds, and 0.3 assists. On January 7, 2026, Sears was waived by the Bucks.

On January 17, 2026, Sears signed with the Wisconsin Herd of the NBA G League. On September 21, he was traded to the Rip City Remix.

== Career statistics ==
Legend
GP	Games played	GS	Games started	MPG	Minutes per game
FG%	Field goal percentage	3P%	3-point field goal percentage	FT%	Free throw percentage
RPG	Rebounds per game	APG	Assists per game	SPG	Steals per game
BPG	Blocks per game	PPG	Points per game	**Bold**	Career high

=== NBA ===
Year	Team	GP	GS	MPG	FG%	3P%	FT%	RPG	APG	SPG	BPG	PPG
2025–26	Milwaukee	7	0	3.7	.462	.500	.750	.3	.3	.0	.0	3.1
Career		7	0	3.7	.462	.500	.750	.3	.3	.0	.0	3.1

=== College ===
Year	Team	GP	GS	MPG	FG%	3P%	FT%	RPG	APG	SPG	BPG	PPG
2020–21	Ohio	24	5	19.5	.467	.279	.851	2.8	3.4	1.0	.0	8.5
2021–22	Ohio	35	35	**35.7**	.444	.408	**.884**	**6.0**	**4.1**	**1.7**	**.1**	19.6
2022–23	Alabama	**37**	**37**	29.8	.406	.345	.847	3.5	2.6	1.2	**.1**	12.5
2023–24	Alabama	**37**	**37**	33.6	**.508**	**.436**	.857	4.2	4.0	1.6	**.1**	**21.5**
2024–25	Alabama	**37**	**37**	32.3	.403	.345	.844	2.9	5.1	.9	**.1**	18.6
Career		170	151	30.9	.445	.375	.858	3.9	3.9	1.3	.1	16.7

== Personal life ==
Sears is a Christian. He is the son of Chad and Lameka Sears.

== See also ==
- List of NCAA Division I men's basketball career scoring leaders
- List of NCAA Division I men's basketball career free throw scoring leaders
- List of NCAA Division I men's basketball career games played leaders
