= RJ Luis Jr. =

American basketball player (born 2002)

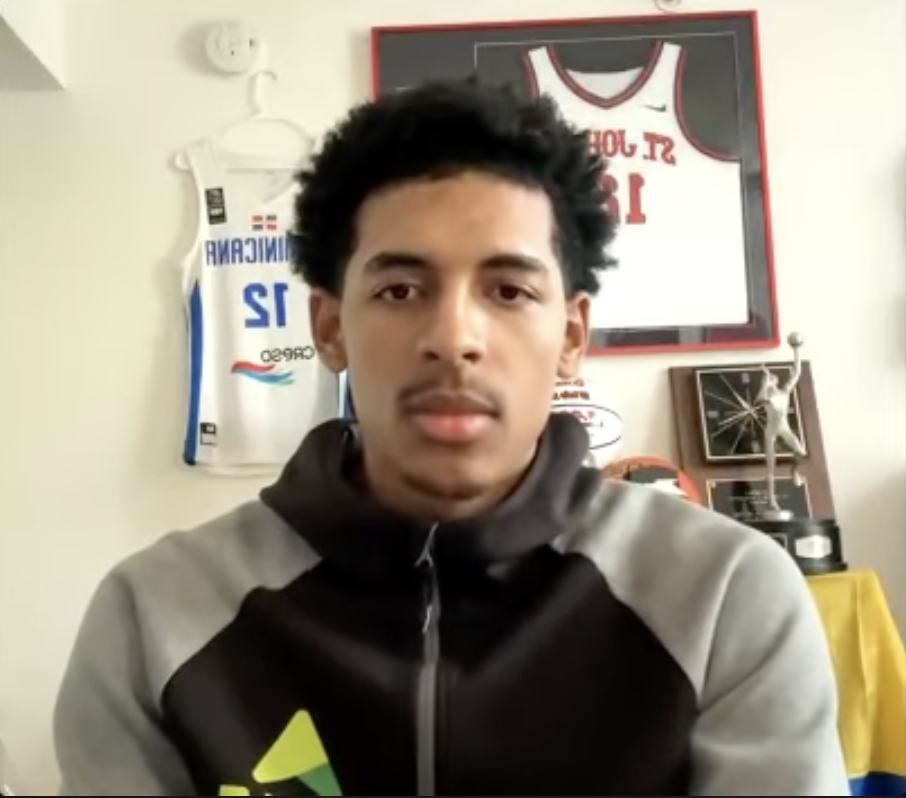
- Luis in 2025

Personal information
- Born: November 27, 2002 (age 23) Miami, Florida, U.S.
- Listed height: 6 ft 7 in (2.01 m)
- Listed weight: 220 lb (100 kg)

Career information
- High school: Christopher Columbus (Westchester, Florida); Mt. Zion Prep Academy (Lanham, Maryland)
- College: UMass (2022–2023); St. John's (2023–2025); LSU (2026)
- NBA draft: 2025: undrafted
- Position: Shooting guard

Career highlights
- Consensus second-team All-American (2025); Big East Player of the Year (2025); First-team All-Big East (2025); Big East tournament MOP (2025); Haggerty Award (2025); Atlantic 10 All-Freshman Team (2023)
- Stats at NBA.com
- Stats at Basketball Reference

Reggie Jason Luis Jr. (born November 27, 2002) is an American-Dominican basketball player. He previously played for the UMass Minutemen, St. John's Red Storm, and LSU Tigers.

== Early life ==
Luis attended Christopher Columbus High School in Miami, Florida, before transferring to Mt. Zion Prep Academy in Maryland. As a recruit, Luis was rated as the 233rd overall player in the class of 2022 and committed to play college basketball for the UMass Minutemen under Frank Martin.

== College career ==
=== UMass ===
As a freshman in 2022–23, Luis appeared in 27 games with ten starts, where he averaged 11.5 points, 4.6 rebounds, 1.3 assists and 1.1 steals per game, while shooting 45.5 percent from the field and 34.8 percent from three-point range. He was named to the Atlantic 10 Conference all-freshman team. After the season, Luis entered his name into the NCAA transfer portal.

=== St. John's ===
Luis transferred to play for Rick Pitino and the St. John's Red Storm. In his first season with the Red Storm in 2023–24, he appeared in just 23 games with ten starts due to being hampered by a hand injury, where he averaged 10.9 points and 4.6 rebounds per game. On February 7, 2025, Luis dropped 21 points and seven rebounds in a win over UConn. On February 16, 2025, he notched 21 points, 14 rebounds and five assists in a win over #24 Creighton. On March 1, 2025, he scored 21 points and grabbed six rebounds in a win over Seton Hall to clinch the Big East championship.

=== LSU ===
On May 19, 2026, after a year away from college basketball, Luis signed to play at LSU for head coach Will Wade after going unselected in the 2025 NBA draft. After filing a lawsuit against the NCAA, Luis was granted a preliminary injunction by a judge in the East Baton Rouge Parish District Court and as a result declared eligible for the 2026–27 season. The following day, the Southeastern Conference ruled him ineligible to play for LSU under its new conference specific rules regarding NBA draft declarations and signed contracts. After missing the first four games, LSU added Luis to their roster after he was granted a preliminary injunction against the NCAA, with clear language stating LSU could not be punished for playing him. The SEC submitted to the court ruling in favor of Luis. He made his LSU debut on November 18, scoring 11 points against Louisiana-Monroe.

The following day, on November 19, LSU president Wade Rousse instructed LSU coach Will Wade to stop playing Luis, due to threats of boycotts and sanctions against LSU. Later that evening, Luis announced through his attorney that he would stop pursuing his year of eligibility at LSU and would not play for the team.

== Professional career ==
On June 26, 2025 after being undrafted in the 2025 NBA draft, Luis signed a two-way contract with the Utah Jazz. On August 6, Luis was traded alongside an $8 million trade exception to the Boston Celtics in exchange for Georges Niang and two future second-round draft picks. He was waived on October 15, before the start of the season. Following his cut, Luis signed an Exhibit 10 contract with the Celtics' NBA G League affiliate, the Maine Celtics. Luis was waived by the Maine Celtics before the start of the season due to an injury.

== International career ==
On July 7, 2026, Luis played for the Dominican Republic in the FIBA Basketball World Cup 2027 Americas Qualifiers, scoring 22 points and collecting 17 rebounds.

== Personal life ==
Luis is American, Dominican, and Ecuadorian. Luis' father, Reggie Luis, is Dominican, and his mother, Verito Luis, is Ecuadorian. Luis also has two younger sisters, Racheal and Rylee. He is fluent in both Spanish and English.
