= Tyson Degenhart =

American basketball player (born 2002)

No. 20 – Raptors 905
- Position: Power forward
- League: NBA G League

Personal information
- Born: October 13, 2002 (age 23) Spokane, Washington, U.S.
- Listed height: 6 ft 8 in (2.03 m)
- Listed weight: 235 lb (107 kg)

Career information
- High school: Mt. Spokane (Mead, Washington)
- College: Boise State (2021–2025)
- NBA draft: 2025: undrafted
- Playing career: 2025–present

Career history
- 2025–present: Raptors 905

Career highlights
- 3× First-team All-Mountain West (2023–2025); Mountain West Freshman of the Year (2022)
- Stats at NBA.com
- Stats at Basketball Reference

Tyson Degenhart (/ˈdeɪˌɡinhɑːrt/ DAY-gin-hart; born October 13, 2002) is an American professional basketball player for the Raptors 905 of the NBA G League. He played college basketball for the Boise State Broncos of the Mountain West Conference.

== Early life and high school ==
Degenhart grew up in Spokane, Washington and attended Mt. Spokane High School. He led Mt. Spokane High School to their first WIAA 3A state championship game in school history as a sophomore, averaging 19.3 points per game. Degenhart was a two-time Greater Spokane League Player of the Year honoree. He committed to play college basketball at Boise State during his junior season.

== College career ==
Degenhart averaged 9.9 points and 3.9 rebounds per game in his first season with the Boise State Broncos and was named the Mountain West Conference Freshman of the Year. As a sophomore, he averaged 14.1 points per game. He repeated as a first-team All-Mountain West selection after averaging 16.7 points and 6.2 rebounds during his junior season. As a senior, Degenhart averaged 18.3 points, 6.1 rebounds and 1.6 assists per game while shooting 52.6 percent from the floor. He finished as Boise State's all-time leading scorer with 2,037 points. Degenhart led the Broncos to an appearance in the inaugural College Basketball Crown tournament.

== Professional career ==
After going unselected in the 2025 NBA draft, Degenhart signed an Exhibit 10 contract with the Toronto Raptors.
