= 2024–25 Mid-American Conference men's basketball season =

- League: NCAA Division I
- Sport: Basketball
- Teams: 12

Regular season
- League champions: Akron
- Runners-up: Miami
- Season MVP: Nate Johnson

Tournament

Mid-American men's basketball seasons
- ← 2023–24 2025–26 →

2024–25 Mid-American Conference men's basketball standings
	Conf.				Overall
Team	W		L	PCT	W		L	PCT
Akron †	17	–	1	.944	28	–	7	.800
Miami (OH)	14	–	4	.778	25	–	9	.735
Kent State	11	–	7	.611	24	–	12	.667
Toledo	10	–	8	.556	18	–	15	.545
Ohio	10	–	8	.556	16	–	16	.500
Western Michigan	9	–	9	.500	12	–	20	.375
Eastern Michigan	9	–	9	.500	16	–	16	.500
Bowling Green	8	–	10	.444	14	–	18	.438
Ball State	7	–	11	.389	14	–	17	.452
Central Michigan	7	–	11	.389	14	–	17	.452
Buffalo	4	–	14	.222	9	–	22	.290
Northern Illinois	2	–	16	.111	6	–	25	.194
† 2025 MAC tournament winner

The 2024–25 Mid-American Conference men's basketball season will be the season for Mid-American Conference men's basketball teams. It will begin with practices in October 2024, followed by the start of the 2024–25 NCAA Division I men's basketball season in November. Conference play will begin in January 2024 and conclude in March 2024. The 2025 MAC tournament will be held at Rocket Arena in Cleveland, Ohio for the 26th consecutive season. This will be the conference's last season with 12 members as it will see its first change in membership since 2005 with the addition of UMass.

Akron won the regular season championship with a 17–1 conference record. Nate Johnson of Akron was player of the year. Akron defeated Bowling Green and Toledo in the MAC tournament and then Miami in the final

== Head coaches ==
=== Coaching changes ===
There have been no coaching changes since the end of the 2023–24 NCAA Division I men's basketball season.

=== Coaches ===
Team	Head coach	Previous job	Years at school	Overall record	School record	MAC record	MAC titles	MAC Tournament titles	NCAA tournaments	NCAA Final Fours	NCAA Championships
Akron	John Groce	Illinois	8	220–212 (.509)	140–80 (.636)	80–48 (.625)	1	2	2	0	0
Ball State	Michael Lewis	UCLA (Asst.)	3	35–28 (.556)	35–28 (.556)	18–18 (.500)	0	0	0	0	0
Bowling Green	Todd Simon	Southern Utah	2	147–128 (.535)	20–14 (.588)	10–8 (.556)	0	0	0	0	0
Buffalo	George Halcovage	Villanova (Assoc. HC)	2	4–27 (.129)	4–27 (.129)	2–16 (.111)	0	0	0	0	0
Central Michigan	Tony Barbee	Kentucky (Asst.)	4	166–185 (.473)	35–58 (.376)	23–31 (.426)	0	0	0	0	0
Eastern Michigan	Stan Heath	Lakeland Magic	4	240–269 (.472)	31–62 (.333)	16–40 (.286)	0	0	0	0	0
Kent State	Rob Senderoff	Kent State (Asst.)	14	264–164 (.617)	264–164 (.617)	138–94 (.595)	1	2	2	0	0
Miami	Travis Steele	Xavier	3	97–87 (.527)	27–37 (.422)	15–21 (.417)	0	0	0	0	0
Northern Illinois	Rashon Burno	Arizona State (Asst.)	4	33–60 (.355)	33–60 (.355)	20–36 (.357)	0	0	0	0	0
Ohio	Jeff Boals	Stony Brook	6	152–102 (.598)	98–60 (.620)	54–35 (.607)	0	1	1	0	0
Toledo	Tod Kowalczyk	Green Bay	15	414–293 (.586)	278–181 (.606)	156–93 (.627)	5	0	0	0	0
Western Michigan	Dwayne Stephens	Michigan State (Assoc. HC)	3	20–43 (.317)	20–43 (.317)	13–23 (.361)	0	0	0	0	0

Notes:

- Appearances, titles, etc. are from time with current school only.
- Years at school includes 2024–25 season.
- MAC records are from time at current school only.
- All records are through the beginning of the season.

Source -

== Preseason ==
The MAC Men’s & Women’s Basketball Tip-Off was held on Tuesday, October 22, 2024. Each team had their head coach and a student athlete from both the men's and women's basketball team for interviews.

MAC Men's Basketball Preview Coaches & Student-Athletes

- Akron: Head Coach John Groce & Nate Johnson (R-Junior, Guard)
- Ball State: Head Coach Michael Lewis & Payton Sparks (Senior, Center)
- Bowling Green: Head Coach Todd Simon & Trey Thomas (Senior, Guard)
- Buffalo: Head Coach George Halcovage III & Noah Batchelor (Junior, Forward)
- Central Michigan: Head Coach Tony Barbee & Anthony Pritchard (Senior, Guard)
- Eastern Michigan: Head Coach Stan Heath & Jalin Billingsley (Senior, Forward)
- Kent State: Head Coach Rob Senderoff & VonCameron Davis (R-Senior, Forward)
- Miami: Head Coach Travis Steele & Eian Elmer (Sophomore, Wing)
- Northern Illinois: Head Coach Rashon Burno & Quentin Jones (Sophomore, Guard)
- Ohio: Head Coach Jeff Boals & AJ Clayton (Senior, Forward)
- Toledo: Head Coach Tod Kowalczyk & Javan Simmons (Sophomore, Forward)
- Western Michigan: Head Coach Dwayne Stephens & JaVaughn Hannah (Junior, Guard)

=== Preseason men's basketball coaches poll ===
Men's Basketball Preseason Poll
Place	Team	Points	First place votes
1.	Ohio	121	11
2.	Akron	106	1
3.	Kent State	99	--
4.	Toledo	95	--
5.	Bowling Green	73	--
6.	Miami	72	--
7.	Ball State	67	--
8.	Central Michigan	55	--
9.	Eastern Michigan	36	--
10.	Western Michigan	33	--
11.	Northern Illinois	24	--
12.	Buffalo	11	--

MAC Tournament Champions:Ohio (8), Kent State (3), Toledo (1)

=== MAC Preseason All-Conference ===
Honor	Recipient
Preseason All-MAC First Team	Peyton Sparks, Center, Akron, Sr.
Preseason All-MAC First Team	Anthony Pritchard, Guard, Central Michigan, Sr.
Preseason All-MAC First Team	VonCameron Davis, Forward, Kent State, R-Sr.
Preseason All-MAC First Team	AJ Clayton, Forward, Ohio, Sr.
Preseason All-MAC First Team	Javon Simmons, Forward, Toledo, Jr.
Preseason All-MAC Second Team	Isaiah Gray, Guard, Akron, Sr.
Preseason All-MAC Second Team	Jalen Sullinger, Guard, Kent State, Sr.
Preseason All-MAC Second Team	Shereef Mitchell, Guard, Ohio, Grad.
Preseason All-MAC Second Team	AJ Brown, Guard, Ohio, R-So..
Preseason All-MAC Second Team	Isaiah Adams, Guard, Toledo, 5th

== Regular season ==
=== Rankings ===
		Pre	Wk 2	Wk 3	Wk 4	Wk 5	Wk 6	Wk 7	Wk 8	Wk 9	Wk 10	Wk 11	Wk 12	Wk 13	Wk 14	Wk 15	Wk 16	Wk 17	Wk 18	Wk 19	Final
Akron	AP																		RV	RV	
Akron	C																				
Ball State	AP																				
Ball State	C																				
Bowling Green	AP																				
Bowling Green	C																				
Buffalo	AP																				
Buffalo	C																				
Central Michigan	AP																				
Central Michigan	C																				
Eastern Michigan	AP																				
Eastern Michigan	C																				
Kent State	AP																				
Kent State	C																				
Miami	AP																				
Miami	C																				
Northern Illinois	AP																				
Northern Illinois	C																				
Ohio	AP																				
Ohio	C																				
Toledo	AP																				
Toledo	C																				
Western Michigan	AP																				
Western Michigan	C																				

Legend
	Improvement in ranking
	Drop in ranking
	Not ranked previous week
	No change in ranking from previous week
RV	Received votes but were not ranked in Top 25 of poll
т	Tied with team above or below also with this symbol

=== Conference matrix ===
	Akron	Ball State	Bowling Green	Buffalo	Central Michigan	Eastern Michigan	Kent State	Miami (OH)	Northern Illinois	Ohio	Toledo	Western Michigan
vs. Akron	—	0–2	0–1	0–2	0–2	0–1	0–2	0–1	0–2	1–1	0–2	0–1
vs. Ball State	2–0	—	1–1	0–2	1–1	0–1	0–1	2–0	1–1	1–0	2–0	1–0
vs. Bowling Green	1–0	1–1	—	0–2	1–0	1–1	2–0	1–0	0–2	1–0	1–1	1–1
vs. Buffalo	2–0	2–0	2–0	—	1–1	1–0	1–0	2–0	0–1	1–0	1–1	1–1
vs. Central Michigan	2–0	1–1	0–1	1–1	—	1–1	1–0	1–0	1–1	2–0	1–0	0–2
vs. Eastern Michigan	1–0	1–0	1–1	0–1	1–1	—	2–0	1–1	0–2	0–2	1–1	1–0
vs. Kent State	2–0	1–0	0–2	0–1	0–1	0–2	—	2–0	0–1	1–1	0–2	1–1
vs. Miami (OH)	1–0	0–2	0–1	0–2	0–1	1–1	0–2	—	0–2	1–1	0–1	1–1
vs. Northern Illinois	2–0	1–1	2–0	1–0	1–1	2–0	1–0	2–0	—	1–0	1–0	2–0
vs. Ohio	1–1	0–1	0–1	0–1	0–2	2–0	1–1	1–1	0–1	—	2–0	1–1
vs. Toledo	2–0	0–2	1–1	1–1	0–1	1–1	2–0	1–0	0–1	0–2	—	0–1
vs. Western Michigan	1–0	0–1	1–1	1–1	2–0	0–1	1–1	1–1	0–2	1–1	1–0	—
Total	17–1	7–11	8–10	4–14	7–11	9–9	11–7	14–4	2–16	10–8	10–8	9–9

== All-MAC awards ==
=== Mid-American men's basketball weekly awards ===
Week	Player(s) of the Week	School
Nov 11	Tyson Dunn	Buffalo
Nov 18	Sonny Wilson	Toledo
Nov 25	AJ Clayton; Nate Johnson	Ohio; Akron
Dec 2	Jermahri Hill; Da’Sean Nelson	Ball State; Eastern Michigan
Dec 9	Derrick Butler; Peter Suder	Bowling Green; Miami
Dec 16	Juanse Gorosito	Ball State
Dec 23	Da’Sean Nelson (2)	Eastern Michigan
Dec 30	Javontae Campbell	Bowling Green
Jan 6	Da’Sean Nelson (3)	Eastern Michigan
Jan 13	AJ Clayton (2)	Ohio
Jan 20	Amani Lyles	Akron
Jan 27	Tavari Johnson	Akron
Feb 3	Payton Sparks	Ball State
Feb 10	Sam Lewis	Toledo
Feb 17	Jalen Terry	Eastern Michigan
Feb 24	Jalen Terry (2)	Eastern Michigan
Mar 3	Javontae Campbell (2); Chansey Willis Jr.	Bowling Green; Western Michigan
Mar 10	Jalen Sullinger; Javan Simmons	Kent State; Toledo

=== Postseason awards ===
2025 Mid-American Men's Basketball Individual Awards
Award	Recipient(s)
Player of the Year	Nate Johnson, Akron
Coach of the Year	John Groce
Defensive Player of the Year	Nate Johnson., Akron
Freshman of the Year	Brant Byers, Miami
Sixth Man Award	Shammah Scott., Akron

=== All-MAC Honors ===
2025 Mid-American Men's Basketball All-Conference Teams
First Team	Second Team	Third Team	Honorable Mention	All-Defensive	Freshman Team
Nate Johnson, Akron; Tavari Johnson, Akron; Ugnius Jarusevicius, Central Michigan; VonCameron Davis, Kent State; Peter Suder, Miami	Da’Sean Nelson, Eastern Michigan; Jalen Terry, Eastern Michigan; Jalen Sullinger, Kent State; Sam Lewis, Toledo; Chansey Willis Jr., Western Michigan	Javontae Campbell, Bowling Green; Anthony Pritchard, Central Michigan; Kam Craft, Miami; AJ Clayton, Ohio; Jackson Paveletzke, Ohio; Sonny Wilson, Toledo	Isaiah Gray, Akron; Jermahri Hill, Ball State; Payton Sparks, Ball State; Shereef Mitchell, Ohio; Javan Simmons, Toledo	Nate Johnson, Akron; Javontae Campbell, Bowling Green; Anthony Pritchard, Central Michigan; Cli’ron Hornbeak, Kent State; Shereef Mitchell, Ohio	Sharron Young, Akron; Jamai Felt, Bowling Green; Ben Michaels, Buffalo; Brant Byers, Miami; Elijah Elliot, Ohio

== Postseason ==
=== Mid–American Tournament ===
Akron defeated Bowling Green, Toledo, Miami to win the MAC's automatic bid to the NCAA Tournament Nate Johnson was the MVP.

=== NCAA tournament ===
As a 13 seed, Akron lost their first round matchup in the NCAA tournament to Arizona.

=== National Invitation tournament ===
Kent State defeated St. Bonaventure and Stanford in the first two rounds. They then lost to Loyola-Chicago.

== See also ==
2024–25 Mid-American Conference women's basketball season
