= 2024–25 Akron Zips men's basketball team =

American college basketball season

2024–25 Akron Zips men's basketball

MAC regular season & tournament champions

NCAA tournament, First Round
- Conference: Mid-American Conference
- Record: 28–7 (17–1 MAC)
- Head coach: John Groce (8th season)
- Associate head coach: Dustin Ford (8th season)
- Assistant coaches: Robby Pridgen (8th season); Mike Allen (1st season); Jon Ekey (1st season); Devan Morrow (1st season)
- Home arena: James A. Rhodes Arena

2024–25 Mid-American Conference men's basketball standings
	Conf.				Overall
Team	W		L	PCT	W		L	PCT
Akron †	17	–	1	.944	28	–	7	.800
Miami (OH)	14	–	4	.778	25	–	9	.735
Kent State	11	–	7	.611	24	–	12	.667
Toledo	10	–	8	.556	18	–	15	.545
Ohio	10	–	8	.556	16	–	16	.500
Western Michigan	9	–	9	.500	12	–	20	.375
Eastern Michigan	9	–	9	.500	16	–	16	.500
Bowling Green	8	–	10	.444	14	–	18	.438
Ball State	7	–	11	.389	14	–	17	.452
Central Michigan	7	–	11	.389	14	–	17	.452
Buffalo	4	–	14	.222	9	–	22	.290
Northern Illinois	2	–	16	.111	6	–	25	.194
† 2025 MAC tournament winner

The 2024–25 Akron Zips men's basketball team represented the University of Akron during the 2024–25 NCAA Division I men's basketball season. The Zips, led by eighth-year head coach John Groce, played their home games at the James A. Rhodes Arena in Akron, Ohio as members of the Mid-American Conference.

They won the MAC with a 17–1 record and the MAC tournament As a 13 seed, they lost their first round matchup in the NCAA tournament to Arizona.

== Previous season ==
The Zips finished the 2023–24 season 24–11, 13–5 in MAC play to finish in a tie for second place. They defeated Miami (OH), Ohio, and Kent State to win the MAC tournament championship for the second time in three years and earn the MAC's automatic bid to the NCAA tournament. In the NCAA tournament, they received the #14 seed in the Midwest Region, where they would fall to #3 region seed Creighton in the First Round.

== Offseason ==
=== Departures ===
Departures
Name	Number	Pos.	Height	Weight	Year	Hometown	Reason for departure
Greg Tribble	2	G	6'3"	195	Senior	Cincinnati, Ohio	Graduated
Kaleb Thornton	3	G	6'0"	175	Senior	Bolingbrook, Illinois	Graduated
Darrion Baker	4	F	6'8"	225	Freshman	Chicago, Illinois	Transferred to SIU Edwardsville
Ryan Prather Jr.	10	G	6'5"	205	RS Freshman	Clarksburg, Maryland	Transferred to Robert Morris
Sammy Hunter	11	W	6'9"	225	Senior	Nassau, Bahamas	Graduated
Mikal Dawson	22	W	6'5"	222	Senior	Huntington, West Virginia	Transferred to Marshall
Ali Ali	24	G	6'8"	205	Senior	Kendallville, Indiana	Graduated
Enrique Freeman	25	F	6'7"	206	Senior	Cleveland, Ohio	Graduated; Drafted 50th overall by the Indiana Pacers in the 2024 NBA draft

=== Incoming transfers ===
Incoming transfers
Name	Number	Pos.	Height	Weight	Year	Hometown	Previous school
Isaiah Gray	13	G	6'3"	220	Senior	Brooklyn, New York	Cornell
Seth Wilson	14	G	6'2"	220	Senior	Lorain, Ohio	West Virginia
Bowen Hardman	15	G	6'3"	220	Junior	Cincinnati, Ohio	Ohio State
Josiah Harris	22	W	6'7"	210	Junior	Canton, Ohio	West Virginia
James Okonkwo	32	F	6'8"	240	Senior	Maidenhead, England	North Carolina

=== Recruiting class ===
College recruiting information
Name	Hometown	School	Height	Weight	Commit date
Rich Brisco; F	Brooklyn, New York	Hillcrest Prep	6 ft 8 in (2.03 m)	230 lb (100 kg)	
Rich Brisco; F	Recruit ratings: Rivals: 247Sports: ESPN: (N/A)				
Sharron Young; G	Morgantown, West Virginia	Morgantown High School	6 ft 0 in (1.83 m)	160 lb (73 kg)	
Sharron Young; G	Recruit ratings: Rivals: 247Sports: ESPN: (N/A)				
Eric Mahaffey; G	Cincinnati, Ohio	Archbishop Moeller High School	6 ft 4 in (1.93 m)	190 lb (86 kg)	
Eric Mahaffey; G	Recruit ratings: Rivals: 247Sports: ESPN: (N/A)				
Conner Groce; G	Richfield, Ohio	Revere High School	6 ft 0 in (1.83 m)	165 lb (75 kg)	
Conner Groce; G	Recruit ratings: Rivals: 247Sports: ESPN: (N/A)				
Overall recruit ranking:
Note: In many cases, Scout, Rivals, 247Sports, On3, and ESPN may conflict in their listings of height and weight.; In these cases, the average was taken. ESPN grades are on a 100-point scale.; Sources: "2024 Team Ranking". Rivals.

== Preseason ==
On October 22, 2024 the MAC released the preseason coaches poll. Akron was picked to finish second in the MAC regular season and received 1 of the 12 first place votes.

=== Preseason rankings ===
MAC preseason poll
Predicted finish	Team	Votes (1st place)
1	Ohio	121 (11)
2	Akron	106 (1)
3	Kent State	99
4	Toledo	95
5	Bowling Green	73
6	Miami (OH)	72
7	Ball State	67
8	Central Michigan	55
9	Eastern Michigan	36
10	Western Michigan	33
11	Northern Illinois	24
12	Buffalo	11

MAC Tournament Champions: Ohio (8), Kent State (3), Toledo (1)

=== Preseason All-MAC ===
Preseason All-MAC teams
Team	Player	Position	Year
Second	Isaiah Gray	Guard	Senior

== Roster ==
2024–25 Akron Zips men's basketball team
Players
Coaches

Pos.	#	Name	Height	Weight	Year	Previous school	Hometown
F	0	Amani Lyles	6 ft 7 in (2.01 m)	235 lb (107 kg)	Jr	Beechcroft High School	Columbus, Ohio
G	1	Shammah Scott	6 ft 2 in (1.88 m)	195 lb (88 kg)	Sr	Wichita State	Cleveland, Ohio
F	2	Rich Brisco	6 ft 8 in (2.03 m)	230 lb (104 kg)	Fr	Hillcrest Prep	Brooklyn, New York
G	3	Sharron Young	6 ft 0 in (1.83 m)	160 lb (73 kg)	Fr	Morgantown High School	Morgantown, West Virginia
G	4	Eric Mahaffey	6 ft 4 in (1.93 m)	190 lb (86 kg)	Fr	Archbishop Moeller High School	Cincinnati, Ohio
G	5	Tavari Johnson	5 ft 11 in (1.8 m)	160 lb (73 kg)	Jr	Lyons High School	Chicago, Illinois
G	11	Conner Groce	6 ft 0 in (1.83 m)	165 lb (75 kg)	Fr	Revere High School	Richfield, Ohio
G	13	Isaiah Gray	6 ft 3 in (1.91 m)	220 lb (100 kg)	Sr	Cornell	Brooklyn, New York
G	14	Seth Wilson	6 ft 2 in (1.88 m)	220 lb (100 kg)	Sr	West Virginia	Lorain, Ohio
G	15	Bowen Hardman	6 ft 3 in (1.91 m)	190 lb (86 kg)	Jr	Ohio State	Cincinnati, Ohio
G	20	Evan Wilson	6 ft 2 in (1.88 m)	195 lb (88 kg)	Sr	Noblesville High School	Noblesville, Indiana
G/F	21	Zach Halligan	6 ft 4 in (1.93 m)	203 lb (92 kg)	So	Walsh Jesuit High School	Uniontown, Ohio
G/F	22	Josiah Harris	6 ft 7 in (2.01 m)	210 lb (95 kg)	Jr	West Virginia	Canton, Ohio
G/F	23	Marvin Musiime-Kamali	6 ft 6 in (1.98 m)	195 lb (88 kg)	RS Fr	Cushing Academy	Brockton, Massachusetts
F	32	James Okonkwo	6 ft 8 in (2.03 m)	240 lb (109 kg)	Sr	North Carolina	Maidenhead, England
G	34	Nate Johnson	6 ft 3 in (1.91 m)	205 lb (93 kg)	RS Jr	Lakota East High School	Liberty Township, Ohio

Head coach

- John Groce (Taylor)

Assistant coach(es)

- Dustin Ford (Ohio)
- Robby Pridgen (Roanoke)
- Mike Allen (Ohio)
- Jon Ekey (Illinois State)
- Devan Morrow (Ohio State)

Legend

- (C) Team captain
- (S) Suspended
- (I) Ineligible
- (W) Walk-on
- Injured
- Current redshirt

Roster
Last update: November 17, 2024

== Schedule and results ==
Date time, TV	Rank^{#}	Opponent^{#}	Result	Record	High points	High rebounds	High assists	Site (attendance) city, state
Non-conference regular season
November 4, 2024*; 8:00 pm, ESPN+		at Arkansas State; MAC-SBC Challenge	L 75–80 ^{OT}	0–1	15 – Young	12 – Okonkwo	7 – Gray	First National Bank Arena (4,610); Jonesboro, AR
November 8, 2024*; 7:00 pm		Ohio Wesleyan	W 88–57	1–1	15 – Hardman	8 – Lyles	7 – Tied	James A. Rhodes Arena (2,154); Akron, OH
November 12, 2024*; 10:00 pm, ESPN+		at Saint Mary's	L 68–87	1–2	16 – Harris	9 – Okonkwo	4 – Tied	University Credit Union Pavilion (3,316); Moraga, CA
November 22, 2024*; 6:00 pm, ESPN+		Lamar; Akron Basketball Classic	W 79–72	2–2	17 – T. Johnson	11 – Lyles	4 – T. Johnson	James A. Rhodes Arena (1,775); Akron, OH
November 23, 2024*; 4:00 pm, ESPN+		Omaha; Akron Basketball Classic	W 92–84	3–2	18 – Johnson	6 – Lyles	9 – T. Johnson	James A. Rhodes Arena; Akron, OH
November 24, 2024*; 3:00 pm, ESPN+		Alabama State; Akron Basketball Classic	W 97–78	4–2	25 – N. Johnson	10 – Tied	4 – Tied	James A. Rhodes Arena (1,589); Akron, OH
December 3, 2024*; 7:00 pm, ESPN+		Northern Kentucky	W 86–73	5–2	27 – T. Johnson	7 – Harris	5 – T. Johnson	James A. Rhodes Arena (1,578); Akron, OH
December 7, 2024*; 3:00 pm		SUNY Brockport	W 101–48	6–2	20 – Hardman	16 – Okonkwo	5 – Young	James A. Rhodes Arena (1,560); Akron, OH
December 15, 2024*; 1:00 pm, ESPN+		vs. Milwaukee; MKE Tip-Off	L 81–100	6–3	22 – T. Johnson	6 – N. Johnson	4 – N. Johnson	Fiserv Forum; Milwaukee, WI
December 20, 2024*; 7:00 pm, YouTube		vs. Yale; Sun Bowl Invitational semifinals	L 58–74	6–4	23 – T. Johnson	6 – Lyles	4 – N. Johnson	Don Haskins Center; El Paso, TX
December 21, 2024*; 7:00 pm, YouTube		vs. Jackson State; Sun Bowl Invitational 3rd place game	W 68–50	7–4	12 – Scott	16 – Okonkwo	6 – N. Johnson	Don Haskins Center; El Paso, TX
December 30, 2024*; 1:00 pm, ESPN+		at Princeton	L 75–76	7–5	17 – N. Johnson	10 – Okonkwo	2 – Tied	Jadwin Gymnasium (2,677); Princeton, NJ
MAC regular season
January 3, 2025; 6:00 pm, CBSSN		at Bowling Green	W 71–68	8–5 (1–0)	17 – Young	9 – Okonkwo	5 – T. Johnson	Stroh Center (2,892); Bowling Green, OH
January 7, 2025; 7:00 pm, ESPN+		Central Michigan	W 87–71	9–5 (2–0)	18 – Wilson	8 – Okonkwo	4 – Tied	James A. Rhodes Arena (1,597); Akron, OH
January 11, 2025; 3:30 pm, ESPN+		at Eastern Michigan	W 105–81	10–5 (3–0)	17 – Okonkwo	7 – Musiime-Kamali	10 – T. Johnson	George Gervin GameAbove Center (2,540); Ypsilanti, MI
January 14, 2025; 7:00 pm, ESPN+		Toledo	W 85–78	11–5 (4–0)	28 – N. Johnson	9 – N. Johnson	9 – T. Johnson	James A. Rhodes Arena (2,011); Akron, OH
January 17, 2025; 6:00 pm, CBSSN		Ohio	W 92–80	12–5 (5–0)	22 – Gray	8 – N. Johnson	6 – Lyles	James A. Rhodes Arena (2,830); Akron, OH
January 21, 2025; 7:00 pm, ESPN+		at Buffalo	W 90–58	13–5 (6–0)	20 – T. Johnson	9 – N. Johnson	5 – T. Johnson	Alumni Arena (1,021); Amherst, NY
January 25, 2025; 2:00 pm, ESPN+		Miami (OH)	W 102–75	14–5 (7–0)	15 – T. Johnson	9 – S. Scott	15 – T. Johnson	James A. Rhodes Arena (2,834); Akron, OH
January 28, 2025; 8:00 pm, ESPN+		at Northern Illinois	W 80–70	15–5 (8–0)	21 – T. Johnson	11 – Gray	4 – T. Johnson	Convocation Center (1,059); DeKalb, IL
January 31, 2025; 7:00 pm, CBSSN		at Kent State	W 85–71	16–5 (9–0)	20 – N. Johnson	13 – J. Okonkwo	5 – T. Johnson	MAC Center (6,327); Kent, OH
February 4, 2025; 7:00 pm, ESPN+		Ball State	W 81–73	17–5 (10–0)	18 – S. Young	6 – J. Okonkwo	6 – S. Scott	James A. Rhodes Arena (1,883); Akron, OH
February 8, 2025*; 2:00 p.m., ESPN+		South Alabama; MAC-SBC Challenge	W 80–65	18–5	20 – T. Johnson	10 – J. Okonkwo	10 – N. Johnson	James A. Rhodes Arena (1,505); Akron, OH
February 11, 2025; 7:00 pm, ESPN+		Western Michigan	W 105–92	19–5 (11–0)	22 – N. Johnson	9 – J. Okonkwo	3 – N. Johnson	James A. Rhodes Arena (1,380); Akron, OH
February 15, 2025; 7:00 pm, ESPN+		at Central Michigan	W 85–82	20–5 (12–0)	18 – N. Johnson	7 – N. Johnson	6 – I. Gray	McGuirk Arena (2,057); Mount Pleasant, MI
February 18, 2025; 7:00 pm, ESPN+		Northern Illinois	W 73–63	21–5 (13–0)	15 – T. Johnson	8 – N. Johnson	4 – S. Scott	James A. Rhodes Arena (3,472); Akron, OH
February 22, 2025; 6:00 pm, ESPN2		at Ohio	L 67–84	21–6 (13–1)	17 – A. Lyles	6 – I. Gray	7 – S. Scott	Convocation Center (6,740); Athens, OH
February 25, 2025; 7:00 pm, ESPN+		at Ball State	W 87–82	22–6 (14–1)	21 – T. Johnson	9 – N. Johnson	5 – S. Scott	Worthen Arena (3,210); Muncie, IN
February 28, 2025; 9:00 p.m., ESPN2		Kent State	W 77–72	23–6 (15–1)	16 – T. Johnson	10 – N. Johnson	4 – N. Johnson	James A. Rhodes Arena (4,967); Akron, OH
March 4, 2025; 7:00 pm, ESPN+		at Toledo	W 96–87	24–6 (16–1)	16 – S. Scott	9 – A. Lyles	5 – S. Scott	Savage Arena (4,145); Toledo, OH
March 7, 2025; 7:00 pm, ESPN+		Buffalo	W 88–70	25–6 (17–1)	14 – Tied	11 – J. Okonkwo	5 – T. Johnson	James A. Rhodes Arena (2,391); Akron, OH
MAC Tournament
March 13, 2025; 11:00 am, ESPN+	(1)	vs. (8) Bowling Green; Quarterfinals	W 96–67	26–6	17 – B. Hardman	8 – J. Okonkwo	7 – T. Johnson	Rocket Arena (8,737); Cleveland, OH
March 14, 2025; 5:00 pm, CBSSN	(1)	vs. (4) Toledo; Semifinals	W 100–90	27–6	31 – N. Johnson	9 – A. Lyles	6 – N. Johnson	Rocket Arena (15,476); Cleveland, OH
March 15, 2025; 7:40 pm, ESPN2	(1)	vs. (2) Miami (OH); Championship	W 76–74	28–6	22 – N. Johnson	14 – Lyles	5 – N. Johnson	Rocket Arena (7,099); Cleveland, OH
NCAA Tournament
March 21, 2025; 7:35 pm, TruTV	(13 E)	vs. (4 E) No. 21 Arizona; First round	L 65–93	28–7	13 – Tied	4 – Tied	4 – A. Lyles	Climate Pledge Arena (16,978); Seattle,WA
*Non-conference game. ^{#}Rankings from AP Poll. (#) Tournament seedings in parentheses. E=East. All times are in Eastern.
