= 2024–25 Eastern Michigan Eagles men's basketball team =

American college basketball season

2024–25 Eastern Michigan Eagles men's basketball
- Conference: Mid-American Conference
- Record: 16–16 (9–9 MAC)
- Head coach: Stan Heath (4th season)
- Assistant coaches: Bob Simon (4th season); Shawn Trice (4th season); Drew Denisco (4th season)
- Home arena: George Gervin GameAbove Center

2024–25 Mid-American Conference men's basketball standings
	Conf.				Overall
Team	W		L	PCT	W		L	PCT
Akron †	17	–	1	.944	28	–	7	.800
Miami (OH)	14	–	4	.778	25	–	9	.735
Kent State	11	–	7	.611	24	–	12	.667
Toledo	10	–	8	.556	18	–	15	.545
Ohio	10	–	8	.556	16	–	16	.500
Western Michigan	9	–	9	.500	12	–	20	.375
Eastern Michigan	9	–	9	.500	16	–	16	.500
Bowling Green	8	–	10	.444	14	–	18	.438
Ball State	7	–	11	.389	14	–	17	.452
Central Michigan	7	–	11	.389	14	–	17	.452
Buffalo	4	–	14	.222	9	–	22	.290
Northern Illinois	2	–	16	.111	6	–	25	.194
† 2025 MAC tournament winner

The 2024–25 Eastern Michigan Eagles men's basketball team represented Eastern Michigan University during the 2024–25 NCAA Division I men's basketball season. The Eagles, led by fourth-year head coach Stan Heath, played their home games at the George Gervin GameAbove Center in Ypsilanti, Michigan as members of the Mid-American Conference (MAC).

== Previous season ==
The Eagles finished the 2023–24 season 13–18, 6–12 in MAC play, to finish in tenth place. They failed to qualify for the MAC tournament, as only the top eight teams qualify.

== Offseason ==
=== Departures ===
Departures
Name	Number	Pos.	Height	Year	Hometown	Reason for departure
Kevin-David Rice	0	G	6' 4"	Junior	Flint, MI	Graduated
Connor Serven	2	F	6' 9"	RS Junior	Prairie City, IL	Transferred to Virginia Tech
John McGriff	3	G	6' 0"	RS Junior	Glenn Dale, MD	Entered transfer portal
Legend Geeter	4	F	6' 8"	RS Sophomore	River Rouge, MI	Transferred to Detroit Mercy
Tyson Acuff	5	G	6' 4"	Junior	Detroit, MI	Transferred to Rutgers
Julius Ellerbe	6	G	6' 7"	RS Junior	Fort Washington, MD	Transferred to Coppin State
Andrew Wells	12	G	6' 3"	Junior	East Lansing, MI	Graduated
Derik Pranger	15	F	6' 9"	RS Freshman	Parker, CO	Transferred to UCCS
Cyril Martynov	21	C	6' 0"	Sophomore	Barrie, ON	Transferred to Eastern Kentucky
Javantae Randle	35	F	6' 11"	RS Sophomore	Detroit, MI	Entered transfer portal
Orlando Lovejoy	55	G	6' 2"	Sophomore	Detroit, MI	Transferred to Detroit Mercy

=== Incoming transfers ===
Incoming transfers
Name	Number	Pos.	Height	Weight	Year	Hometown	Previous school
Da'Sean Nelson	2	F	6' 8"	205	Senior	Toledo, OH	DePaul
Jalen Terry	3	G	6' 0"	158	Senior	Flint, MI	DePaul
Julian Lewis	5	G	6' 6"	200	RS Junior	Ypsilanti, MI	Miami (OH)
Trey Pettigrew	9	G	6' 4"	195	RS Sophomore	Chicago, IL	Nevada
Christian Henry	30	G	6' 3"	—	Junior	Chicago, IL	Panola College
John Shanu II	33	C	6' 11"	245	RS Junior	Houston, TX	UT Rio Grande Valley
Cooper Smith	45	G	6' 1"	180	Senior	Mio, MI	Michigan

=== Recruiting class ===
College recruiting information
Name	Hometown	School	Height	Weight	Commit date
Mario Brunetto; F	La Spezia, Italy	Classical Gymnasium	6 ft 11 in (2.11 m)	N/A	
Mario Brunetto; F	Recruit ratings: Rivals: 247Sports: ESPN: (N/A)				
Mbaye N'Diaye; G	Thiès, Senegal	SEED Academy	6 ft 5 in (1.96 m)	N/A	
Mbaye N'Diaye; G	Recruit ratings: Rivals: 247Sports: ESPN: (N/A)				
Dillon Tingler; G	Hurricane, WV	Huntington Expression Prep	6 ft 7 in (2.01 m)	N/A	
Dillon Tingler; G	Recruit ratings: Rivals: 247Sports: ESPN: (N/A)				
Godslove Nwabude; F	Anambra State, Nigeria	Mt. Zion Prep	6 ft 9 in (2.06 m)	N/A	
Godslove Nwabude; F	Recruit ratings: Rivals: 247Sports: ESPN: (N/A)				
Overall recruit ranking:
Note: In many cases, Scout, Rivals, 247Sports, On3, and ESPN may conflict in their listings of height and weight.; In these cases, the average was taken. ESPN grades are on a 100-point scale.; Sources: "2024 Team Ranking". Rivals.

== Preseason ==
On October 22, 2024 the MAC released the preseason coaches poll. Eastern Michigan was picked to finish ninth in the MAC regular season.

=== Preseason rankings ===
MAC preseason poll
Predicted finish	Team	Votes (1st place)
1	Ohio	121 (11)
2	Akron	106 (1)
3	Kent State	99
4	Toledo	95
5	Bowling Green	73
6	Miami (OH)	72
7	Ball State	67
8	Central Michigan	55
9	Eastern Michigan	36
10	Western Michigan	33
11	Northern Illinois	24
12	Buffalo	11

MAC Tournament Champions: Ohio (8), Kent State (3), Toledo (1)

=== Preseason All-MAC ===
No Eagles were named to the first or second Preseason All-MAC teams.

== Roster ==
2024–25 Eastern Michigan Eagles men's basketball team
Players
Coaches

Pos.	#	Name	Height	Weight	Year	Previous school	Hometown
F	1	Jalin Billingsley	6 ft 8 in (2.03 m)	210 lb (95 kg)	Sr	Georgetown	Cleveland, OH
F	2	Da'Sean Nelson	6 ft 8 in (2.03 m)	205 lb (93 kg)	Sr	DePaul	Toledo, OH
G	3	Jalen Terry	6 ft 0 in (1.83 m)	158 lb (72 kg)	Sr	DePaul	Flint, MI
G	5	Julian Lewis	6 ft 6 in (1.98 m)	200 lb (91 kg)	RS Jr	Miami (OH)	Ypsilanti, MI
F	7	Mario Brunetto	6 ft 11 in (2.11 m)	—	Fr	Classical Gymnasium	La Spezia, Italy
G	8	Mbaye N'Diaye	6 ft 5 in (1.96 m)	—	Fr	SEED Academy	Thiès, Senegal
G	9	Trey Pettigrew	6 ft 4 in (1.93 m)	195 lb (88 kg)	RS So	Nevada	Chicago, IL
G	10	Dillon Tingler	6 ft 7 in (2.01 m)	—	Fr	Huntington Expression Prep	Hurricane, WV
F	13	Godslove Nwabude	6 ft 9 in (2.06 m)	—	Fr	Mt. Zion Prep	Anambra State, Nigeria
G	14	Micah Schnyders	6 ft 4 in (1.93 m)	186 lb (84 kg)	RS Sr	Wheaton College	Yorkville, IL
F	22	Yusuf Jihad	6 ft 8 in (2.03 m)	221 lb (100 kg)	Sr	Oakland	Farmington Hills, MI
G	30	Christian Henry	6 ft 3 in (1.91 m)	—	Jr	Panola College	Chicago, IL
C	33	John II Shanu	6 ft 11 in (2.11 m)	245 lb (111 kg)	RS Jr	UT Rio Grande Valley	Houston, TX
G	44	Arne Osojnik	6 ft 6 in (1.98 m)	195 lb (88 kg)	So	Dream City Christian School	Ljubljana, Slovenia
G	45	Cooper Smith	6 ft 1 in (1.85 m)	180 lb (82 kg)	Sr	Michigan	Mio, MI

Head coach

- Stan Heath (Eastern Michigan)

Assistant coach(es)

- Bob Simon (Eastern Michigan)
- Shawn Trice (Penn)
- Drew Denisco (Wittenberg)

Legend

- (C) Team captain
- (S) Suspended
- (I) Ineligible
- (W) Walk-on
- Injured
- Current redshirt

Roster
Last update: November 15, 2024

== Schedule and results ==
Date time, TV	Rank^{#}	Opponent^{#}	Result	Record	High points	High rebounds	High assists	Site (attendance) city, state
Exhibition
October 30, 2024*; 6:30 p.m.		Central State	W 85–63	–	21 – Henry	4 – tied	4 – Terry	George Gervin GameAbove Center (1,397); Ypsilanti, MI
Non-conference regular season
November 4, 2024*; 8:00 p.m., ESPN+		at Texas State; MAC–SBC Challenge	L 44–64	0–1	17 – Henry	7 – 2 tied	5 – Terry	Strahan Arena (1,292); San Marcos, TX
November 8, 2024*; 12:00 p.m., ESPN+		Siena Heights	W 83–58	1–1	32 – Billingsley	10 – Billingsley	5 – Tingler	George Gervin GameAbove Center (1,450); Ypsilanti, MI
November 14, 2024*; 6:30 p.m., ESPN+		at IU Indy	W 74–71	2–1	28 – Terry	9 – Terry	4 – Henry	The Jungle (752); Indianapolis, IN
November 16, 2024*; 3:00 p.m., ESPN+		at Cleveland State	L 63–71	2–2	25 – Terry	5 – Billingsley	6 – Henry	Wolstein Center (1,386); Cleveland, OH
November 21, 2024*; 7:00 p.m., ESPN+		at Oakland	W 68–64	3–2	16 – Osojnik	7 – Nelson	5 – Terry	OU Credit Union O'rena (1,941); Auburn Hills, MI
November 25, 2024*; 8:00 p.m., ESPN+		at Houston Christian; Houston Christian MTE	W 74–73	4–2	19 – Nelson	6 – Terry	3 – 4 tied	Sharp Gymnasium (654); Houston, TX
November 26, 2024*; 4:30 p.m.		vs. Northern Arizona; Houston Christian MTE	W 72–68	5–2	20 – Nelson	9 – Billingsley	5 – Terry	Sharp Gymnasium (344); Houston, TX
November 30, 2024*; 7:00 p.m., ESPN+		Detroit Mercy	L 89–98 ^{OT}	5–3	28 – Henry	5 – 3 tied	5 – Henry	George Gervin GameAbove Center (1,509); Ypsilanti, MI
December 3, 2024*; 8:30 p.m., ESPN+		at Loyola Chicago	L 54–76	5–4	21 – Henry	5 – Osojnik	2 – 3 tied	Joseph J. Gentile Arena (1,881); Chicago, IL
December 15, 2024*; 2:00 p.m., ESPN+		Purdue Fort Wayne	L 76–99	5–5	28 – Terry	9 – Billingsley	5 – Henry	George Gervin GameAbove Center (1,239); Ypsilanti, MI
December 21, 2024*; 2:00 p.m., ESPN+		Wright State	W 86–82	6–5	27 – Nelson	13 – Nelson	4 – Terry	George Gervin GameAbove Center (500); Ypsilanti, MI
December 28, 2024*; 2:00 p.m., ESPN+		at Davidson	L 64–86	6–6	16 – Nelson	4 – 2 tied	6 – Terry	John M. Belk Arena (3,066); Davidson, NC
MAC regular season
January 4, 2025; 2:00 p.m., ESPN+		Northern Illinois	W 75–71	7–6 (1–0)	32 – Nelson	9 – Nelson	9 – Henry	George Gervin GameAbove Center (1,535); Ypsilanti, MI
January 7, 2025; 7:00 p.m., ESPN+		at Toledo	L 87–90	7–7 (1–1)	25 – Henry	7 – Tingler	5 – Henry	Savage Arena (4,246); Toledo, OH
January 11, 2025; 3:30 p.m., ESPN+		Akron	L 81–105	7–8 (1–2)	20 – Henry	4 – Terry	4 – 2 tied	George Gervin GameAbove Center (2,540); Ypsilanti, MI
January 14, 2025; 7:00 p.m., ESPN+		at Central Michigan	L 63–82	7–9 (1–3)	15 – Nelson	9 – Nwabude	4 – Billingsley	McGuirk Arena (2,000); Mount Pleasant, MI
January 18, 2025; 2:00 p.m., ESPN+		at Bowling Green	W 68–62	8–9 (2–3)	17 – Henry	11 – Osojnik	5 – Terry	Stroh Center (1,981); Bowling Green, OH
January 21, 2025; 6:30 p.m., ESPN+		Ohio	W 94–87	9–9 (3–3)	21 – Nelson	7 – Nelson	7 – Terry	George Gervin GameAbove Center (1,439); Ypsilanti, MI
January 25, 2025; 2:00 p.m., ESPN+		Buffalo	W 90–77	10–9 (4–3)	18 – Henry	6 – Henry	6 – Henry	George Gervin GameAbove Center (1,513); Ypsilanti, MI
January 28, 2025; 7:00 p.m., ESPN+		at Miami (OH)	L 80–89	10–10 (4–4)	25 – Henry	8 – Nelson	6 – Henry	Millett Hall (2,080); Oxford, OH
February 1, 2025; 1:00 p.m., ESPN+		at Western Michigan	L 54–61	10–11 (4–5)	20 – Nelson	11 – Nelson	5 – Henry	University Arena (1,577); Kalamazoo, MI
February 4, 2025; 6:30 p.m., ESPN+		Kent State	L 49–70	10–12 (4–6)	10 – 3 tied	7 – Nelson	4 – Nelson	George Gervin GameAbove Center (1,696); Ypsilanti, MI
February 8, 2025*; 2:00 p.m., ESPN+		Old Dominion; MAC–SBC Challenge	W 76–70	11–12	22 – Nelson	5 – Tingler	2 – 5 tied	George Gervin GameAbove Center (1,673); Ypsilanti, MI
February 11, 2025; 7:00 p.m., ESPN+		at Ball State	L 84–86 ^{OT}	11–13 (4–7)	25 – Terry	6 – Nelson	8 – Nelson	Worthen Arena (3,118); Muncie, IN
February 15, 2025; 3:30 p.m., ESPN+		Toledo	W 80–73	12–13 (5–7)	38 – Terry	8 – Terry	2 – 3 tied	George Gervin GameAbove Center (2,813); Ypsilanti, MI
February 18, 2025; 6:30 p.m., ESPN+		Miami (OH)	W 76–66	13–13 (6–7)	25 – Nelson	9 – Terry	6 – Henry	George Gervin GameAbove Center (1,294); Ypsilanti, MI
February 22, 2025; 4:30 p.m., ESPN+		at Northern Illinois	W 79–76	14–13 (7–7)	28 – Terry	8 – Billingsley	6 – Henry	Convocation Center (2,983); DeKalb, IL
February 25, 2025; 6:30 p.m., ESPN+		Bowling Green	L 60–65	14–14 (7–8)	14 – Terry	10 – Osojnik	5 – Osojnik	George Gervin GameAbove Center (1,546); Ypsilanti, MI
February 28, 2025; 6:00 p.m., CBSSN		Central Michigan	W 84–73	15–14 (8–8)	25 – 2 tied	10 – Nelson	5 – Nelson	George Gervin GameAbove Center (2,574); Ypsilanti, MI
March 4, 2025; 7:00 p.m., ESPN+		at Ohio	W 83–79	16–14 (9–8)	23 – Henry	7 – Billingsley	6 – Nelson	Convocation Center (4,450); Athens, OH
March 7, 2025; 7:00 p.m., ESPN+		at Kent State	L 70–76	16–15 (9–9)	18 – Henry	8 – Billingsley	6 – Henry	MAC Center (2,231); Kent, OH
MAC tournament
March 13, 2025; 4:30 pm, ESPN+	(7)	vs. (2) Miami (OH); Quarterfinals	L 75–81	16–16	24 – Henry	7 – Nelson	2 – Tied	Rocket Arena; Cleveland, OH
*Non-conference game. ^{#}Rankings from AP poll. (#) Tournament seedings in parentheses. All times are in Eastern.
