= 2024–25 Central Michigan Chippewas men's basketball team =

American college basketball season

2024–25 Central Michigan Chippewas men's basketball
- Conference: Mid-American Conference
- Record: 14–17 (7–11 MAC)
- Head coach: Tony Barbee (4th season)
- Associate head coach: Chris McMillian (4th season)
- Assistant coaches: Scott Cherry (2nd season); Hassan Nizam (2nd season)
- Home arena: McGuirk Arena

2024–25 Mid-American Conference men's basketball standings
	Conf.				Overall
Team	W		L	PCT	W		L	PCT
Akron †	17	–	1	.944	28	–	7	.800
Miami (OH)	14	–	4	.778	25	–	9	.735
Kent State	11	–	7	.611	24	–	12	.667
Toledo	10	–	8	.556	18	–	15	.545
Ohio	10	–	8	.556	16	–	16	.500
Western Michigan	9	–	9	.500	12	–	20	.375
Eastern Michigan	9	–	9	.500	16	–	16	.500
Bowling Green	8	–	10	.444	14	–	18	.438
Ball State	7	–	11	.389	14	–	17	.452
Central Michigan	7	–	11	.389	14	–	17	.452
Buffalo	4	–	14	.222	9	–	22	.290
Northern Illinois	2	–	16	.111	6	–	25	.194
† 2025 MAC tournament winner

The 2024–25 Central Michigan Chippewas men's basketball team represented Central Michigan University during the 2024–25 NCAA Division I men's basketball season. The Chippewas, led by fourth-year head coach Tony Barbee, played their home games at McGuirk Arena in Mount Pleasant, Michigan as members of the Mid-American Conference. They finished the season 14–17, 7–11 in MAC play to finish in a tie for 10th place. They failed to qualify for the MAC tournament.

On April 3, 2025, the school fired head Tony Barbee. On April 14, the school named Ferris State head coach Andy Bronkema the team's new head coach.

== Previous season ==
The Chippewas finished the 2023–24 season 18–13, 12–6 in MAC play, to finish in fourth place. They were defeated by Bowling Green in the quarterfinals of the MAC tournament.

== Offseason ==
=== Departures ===
Departures
Name	Number	Pos.	Height	Weight	Year	Hometown	Reason for departure
Brian Taylor	0	G	6'6"	220	Graduate student	Detroit, Michigan	Graduated
Bryce Eaton	1	G	6'0"	170	Freshman	Detroit, Michigan	Transferred to Saint Peter's
Derrick Butler	3	G	6'2"	195	Junior	Charlotte, North Carolina	Transferred to Bowling Green
Jemal Davis	4	F	6'8"	205	Junior	St. Thomas, USVI	Transferred to UNC Asheville
Josiah Sanders	5	F	6'5"	235	RS Freshman	Phoenix, Arizona	Entered the transfer portal
KJ Oduor	11	C	6'9"	225	Sophomore	Kisumu, Kenya	Transferred to Wayne State
Aidan Rubio	13	G/F	6'6"	200	Sophomore	Flint, Michigan	Transferred to UNC Asheville
Markus Harding	15	F	6'10"	255	Junior	Toronto, Ontario	Transferred to Indiana State
Noah Adamczyk	24	G	6'0"	180	Freshman	Bloomfield Hills, Michigan	Transferred to Northeastern Junior College
Paul McMillan IV	34	G	6'2"	175	Sophomore	Cincinnati, Ohio	Transferred to Canisius
Max Majerle	44	G	6'4"	200	Sophomore	Scottsdale, Arizona	Transferred to Pima Community College

=== Incoming transfers ===
Incoming transfers
Name	Number	Pos.	Height	Weight	Year	Hometown	Previous school
Jakobi Heady	0	G/F	6'6"	200	Senior	Sauk Village, Illinois	Bethune–Cookman
Kyler VanderJagt	4	G	6'4"	205	Junior	Grand Rapids, Michigan	Belmont
Quentin Heady	5	F	6'6"	200	Sophomore	Sauk Village, Illinois	South Suburban College
Damarion Bonds	7	G	6'6"	180	Junior	Pontiac, Michigan	Henry Ford College
Trey Phillips	11	G	6'6"	180	Sophomore	Scottsdale, Arizona	Southern Nazarene
Bryan Ndjonga	13	F	6'9"	200	Sophomore	Yaoundé, Cameroon	Cal State Northridge
Ugnius Jarusevicius	21	F	6'10"	220	Junior	Alytus, Lithuania	Cal State Bakersfield
Armani Mighty	26	C	6'10"	240	Junior	Toronto, Ontario	Boston College

=== Recruiting class ===
College recruiting information
Name	Hometown	School	Height	Weight	Commit date
Mohammad Habhab; F	Dearborn, Michigan	Fordson High School	6 ft 9 in (2.06 m)	205 lb (93 kg)	
Mohammad Habhab; F	Recruit ratings: Rivals: 247Sports: ESPN: (N/A)				
Ryan Hatcher; G	Detroit, Michigan	University of Detroit Jesuit High School	6 ft 2 in (1.88 m)	155 lb (70 kg)	
Ryan Hatcher; G	Recruit ratings: Rivals: 247Sports: ESPN: (N/A)				
Gus Salem; G	Los Angeles, California	Wilbraham & Monson Academy	6 ft 2 in (1.88 m)	185 lb (84 kg)	
Gus Salem; G	Recruit ratings: Rivals: 247Sports: ESPN: (N/A)				
Overall recruit ranking:
Note: In many cases, Scout, Rivals, 247Sports, On3, and ESPN may conflict in their listings of height and weight.; In these cases, the average was taken. ESPN grades are on a 100-point scale.; Sources: "2024 Team Ranking". Rivals.

== Preseason ==
On October 22, 2024 the MAC released the preseason coaches poll. Central Michigan was picked to finish eighth in the MAC regular season.

=== Preseason rankings ===
MAC preseason poll
Predicted finish	Team	Votes (1st place)
1	Ohio	121 (11)
2	Akron	106 (1)
3	Kent State	99
4	Toledo	95
5	Bowling Green	73
6	Miami (OH)	72
7	Ball State	67
8	Central Michigan	55
9	Eastern Michigan	36
10	Western Michigan	33
11	Northern Illinois	24
12	Buffalo	11

MAC Tournament Champions: Ohio (8), Kent State (3), Toledo (1)

=== Preseason All-MAC ===
Preseason All-MAC teams
Team	Player	Position	Year
First	Anthony Pritchard	Guard	Senior

== Roster ==
2024–25 Central Michigan Chippewas men's basketball team
Players
Coaches

Pos.	#	Name	Height	Weight	Year	Previous school	Hometown
G/F	0	Jakobi Heady	6 ft 6 in (1.98 m)	200 lb (91 kg)	Sr	Bethune–Cookman	Sauk Village, Illinois
G	1	Shaedon Simpson	6 ft 6 in (1.98 m)	185 lb (84 kg)	RS Fr	Combine Academy	Toronto, Ontario
G	2	Cayden Vasko	6 ft 6 in (1.98 m)	190 lb (86 kg)	So	Don Bosco Institute	Lowell, Indiana
F	3	Mohammad Habhab	6 ft 9 in (2.06 m)	205 lb (93 kg)	Fr	Fordson High School	Dearborn, Michigan
G	4	Kyler VanderJagt	6 ft 4 in (1.93 m)	205 lb (93 kg)	Jr	Belmont	Grand Rapids, Michigan
F	5	Quentin Heady	6 ft 6 in (1.98 m)	200 lb (91 kg)	So	South Suburban College	Sauk Village, Illinois
G	7	Damarion Bonds	6 ft 6 in (1.98 m)	180 lb (82 kg)	Jr	Henry Ford College	Pontiac, Michigan
G	9	Ryan Hatcher	6 ft 2 in (1.88 m)	155 lb (70 kg)	Fr	University of Detroit Jesuit High School	Detroit, Michigan
F	11	Trey Phillips	6 ft 7 in (2.01 m)	205 lb (93 kg)	So	Southern Nazarene	Scottsdale, Arizona
C	12	Hunter Harding	7 ft 0 in (2.13 m)	245 lb (111 kg)	So	Royal Crown Academy	Toronto, Ontario
F	13	Bryan Ndjonga	6 ft 9 in (2.06 m)	200 lb (91 kg)	So	Cal State Northridge	Yaoundé, Cameroon
F	21	Ugnius Jarusevicius	6 ft 10 in (2.08 m)	220 lb (100 kg)	Jr	Cal State Bakersfield	Alytus, Lithuania
G	22	Drew Barbee	6 ft 3 in (1.91 m)	200 lb (91 kg)	RS Fr	Mount Pleasant High School	Mount Pleasant, Michigan
G	23	Gus Salem	6 ft 2 in (1.88 m)	185 lb (84 kg)	Fr	Wilbraham & Monson Academy	Los Angeles, California
C	26	Armani Mighty	6 ft 10 in (2.08 m)	240 lb (109 kg)	Jr	Boston College	Toronto, Ontario
G	30	Anthony Pritchard	6 ft 2 in (1.88 m)	185 lb (84 kg)	Sr	Tulsa	Tulsa, Oklahoma

Head coach

- Tony Barbee (UMass)

Assistant coach(es)

- Chris McMillian (Wyoming)
- Scott Cherry (North Carolina)
- Hassan Nizam (Capella)

Legend

- (C) Team captain
- (S) Suspended
- (I) Ineligible
- (W) Walk-on
- Injured
- Current redshirt

Roster
Last update: November 15, 2024

== Schedule and results ==
Date time, TV	Rank^{#}	Opponent^{#}	Result	Record	High points	High rebounds	High assists	Site (attendance) city, state
Exhibition
October 27, 2024*; 2:00 pm		Hillsdale	W 90–63	–	18 – Tied	9 – J. Heady	4 – Harding	McGuirk Arena (485); Mount Pleasant, MI
Non-conference regular season
November 4, 2024*; 8:00 pm, ESPN+		at South Alabama; MAC-SBC Challenge	W 74–70	1–0	16 – VanderJagt	8 – J. Heady	6 – Pritchard	Mitchell Center (1,903); Mobile, AL
November 7, 2024*; 7:00 pm, ESPN+		Stony Brook; Marquette Challenge	L 72–73	1–1	15 – J. Heady	8 – J. Heady	6 – Tied	McGuirk Arena (2,002); Mount Pleasant, MI
November 11, 2024*; 9:00 pm, FS1		at No. 15 Marquette; Marquette Challenge	L 62–70	1–2	19 – VanderJagt	14 – Jarusevicius	6 – Pritchard	Fiserv Forum (14,757); Milwaukee, WI
November 13, 2024*; 7:00 pm, ESPN+		at George Mason; Marquette Challenge	W 70–69	2–2	21 – Pritchard	7 – J. Heady	6 – J. Heady	EagleBank Arena (2,248); Fairfax, VA
November 20, 2024*; 7:00 pm, ESPN+		Central State	W 86–52	3–2	18 – Pritchard	8 – Bonds	3 – Tied	McGuirk Arena (1,390); Mount Pleasant, MI
November 25, 2024*; 8:00 pm, B1G+		at Minnesota	L 65–68	3–3	17 – Jarusevicius	13 – J. Heady	5 – Vasko	Williams Arena (7,349); Minneapolis, MN
December 1, 2024*; 2:00 pm, ESPN+		Purdue Northwest	W 115–69	4–3	22 – Bonds	11 – Vasko	6 – Tied	McGuirk Arena (1,043); Mount Pleasant, MI
December 5, 2024*; 7:00 pm		at Aquinas (MI)	W 93–69	5–3	18 – Tied	10 – Vasko	8 – Pritchard	Sturrus Sports & Recreation Center (689); Grand Rapids, MI
December 14, 2024*; 3:00 pm, ESPN+		at Valparaiso	L 77–93	5–4	20 – Pritchard	6 – Tied	3 – Pritchard	Athletics–Recreation Center (1,824); Valparaiso, IN
December 17, 2024*; 7:30 pm, SECN+/ESPN+		vs. Mississippi State; Magnolia Madness	L 59–83	5–5	18 – J. Heady	6 – Tied	2 – Tied	Mississippi Coliseum (2,536); Jackson, MS
December 21, 2024*; 4:00 pm, ESPN+		at Arizona	L 41–94	5–6	10 – Vasko	8 – Ndjonga	2 – Tied	McKale Center (13,093); Tucson, AZ
December 30, 2024*; 2:00 pm, ESPN+		Cleary	W 85–39	6–6	15 – Jarusevicius	13 – Jarusevicius	4 – Tied	McGuirk Arena (1,174); Mount Pleasant, MI
MAC regular season
January 4, 2025; 7:00 pm, ESPN+		Ohio	L 55–57	6–7 (0–1)	15 – J. Heady	11 – Jarusevicius	2 – J. Heady	McGuirk Arena (1,268); Mount Pleasant, MI
January 7, 2025; 7:00 pm, ESPN+		at Akron	L 71–87	6–8 (0–2)	20 – VanderJagt	6 – Ndjonga	5 – Pritchard	James A. Rhodes Arena (1,597); Akron, OH
January 10, 2025; 8:00 pm, CBSSN		at Toledo	L 67–69	6–9 (0–3)	19 – J. Heady	9 – Pritchard	3 – Tied	Savage Arena (3,974); Toledo, OH
January 14, 2025; 7:00 pm, ESPN+		Eastern Michigan	W 82–63	7–9 (1–3)	23 – Jarusevicius	9 – Jarusevicius	3 – Pritchard	McGuirk Arena (2,000); Mount Pleasant, MI
January 18, 2025; 2:00 pm, ESPN+		at Northern Illinois	W 71–66	8–9 (2–3)	16 – J. Heady	9 – J. Heady	9 – Pritchard	Convocation Center (1,320); DeKalb, IL
January 21, 2025; 7:00 pm, ESPN+		Ball State	L 80–82	8–10 (2–4)	17 – Q. Heady	8 – J. Heady	6 – Pritchard	McGuirk Arena (2,423); Mount Pleasant, MI
January 25, 2025; 7:00 pm, ESPN+		Western Michigan	W 73–52	9–10 (3–4)	16 – J. Heady	9 – Pritchard	6 – Pritchard	McGuirk Arena (5,361); Mount Pleasant, MI
January 28, 2025; 7:00 pm, ESPN+		at Buffalo	L 69–75	9–11 (3–5)	16 – Pritchard	11 – J. Heady	5 – Pritchard	Alumni Arena (1,211); Amherst, NY
February 1, 2025; 7:00 pm, ESPN+		Bowling Green	W 90–71	10–11 (4–5)	25 – VanderJagt	12 – Jarusevicius	8 – Pritchard	McGuirk Arena (2,057); Mount Pleasant, MI
February 4, 2025; 7:00 pm, ESPN+		Miami (OH)	L 70–76	10–12 (4–6)	17 – Bonds	8 – Jarusevicius	8 – Pritchard	McGuirk Arena (1,203); Mount Pleasant, MI
February 8, 2025*; 5:00 pm, ESPN+		Texas State; MAC–SBC Challenge	W 85–70	11–12	20 – J. Heady	14 – Jarusevicius	11 – Pritchard	McGuirk Arena (1,244); Mount Pleasant, MI
February 11, 2025; 7:00 pm, ESPN+		at Kent State	L 83–91	11–13 (4–7)	32 – Jarusevicius	10 – Jarusevicius	8 – Pritchard	MAC Center (1,280); Kent, OH
February 15, 2025; 7:00 pm, ESPN+		Akron	L 82–85	11–14 (4–8)	32 – Jarusevicius	10 – Jarusevicius	6 – Pritchard	McGuirk Arena (2,057); Mount Pleasant, MI
February 18, 2025; 7:00 pm, ESPN+		at Ohio	L 82–84	11–15 (4–9)	35 – J. Heady	8 – Vasko	5 – Pritchard	Convocation Center (4,367); Athens, OH
February 22, 2025; 1:00 pm, ESPN+		at Western Michigan	W 86–57	12–15 (5–9)	21 – Jarusevicius	10 – Tied	12 – Pritchard	University Arena (2,506); Kalamazoo, MI
February 25, 2025; 7:00 pm, ESPN+		Buffalo	W 73–69	13–15 (6–9)	18 – Tied	11 – J. Heady	6 – Pritchard	McGuirk Arena (1,244); Mount Pleasant, MI
March 1, 2025; 2:00 pm, ESPN+		at Eastern Michigan	L 73–84	13–16 (6–10)	23 – Jarusevicius	11 – Jarusevicius	7 – Pritchard	George Gervin GameAbove Center (2,574); Ypsilanti, MI
March 4, 2025; 7:00 pm, ESPN+		at Ball State	W 69–67	14–16 (7–10)	18 – Tied	8 – Vasko	6 – Pritchard	Worthen Arena (2,844); Muncie, IN
March 7, 2025; 7:00 pm, ESPN+		Northern Illinois	L 81–83 ^{2OT}	14–17 (7–11)	20 – J. Heady	9 – J. Heady	3 – J. Heady	McGuirk Arena (1,432); Mount Pleasant, MI
*Non-conference game. ^{#}Rankings from AP Poll. (#) Tournament seedings in parentheses. All times are in Eastern.
