= 2024–25 Bowling Green Falcons men's basketball team =

American college basketball season

2024–25 Bowling Green Falcons men's basketball
- Conference: Mid-American Conference
- Record: 14–18 (8–10 MAC)
- Head coach: Todd Simon (2nd season)
- Associate head coach: Lourawls Nairn Jr. (2nd season)
- Assistant coaches: Bryce Martin (2nd season); German Srulovich (2nd season); Bob Gallager (2nd season); Jason Newkirk (1st season)
- Home arena: Stroh Center

2024–25 Mid-American Conference men's basketball standings
	Conf.				Overall
Team	W		L	PCT	W		L	PCT
Akron †	17	–	1	.944	28	–	7	.800
Miami (OH)	14	–	4	.778	25	–	9	.735
Kent State	11	–	7	.611	24	–	12	.667
Toledo	10	–	8	.556	18	–	15	.545
Ohio	10	–	8	.556	16	–	16	.500
Western Michigan	9	–	9	.500	12	–	20	.375
Eastern Michigan	9	–	9	.500	16	–	16	.500
Bowling Green	8	–	10	.444	14	–	18	.438
Ball State	7	–	11	.389	14	–	17	.452
Central Michigan	7	–	11	.389	14	–	17	.452
Buffalo	4	–	14	.222	9	–	22	.290
Northern Illinois	2	–	16	.111	6	–	25	.194
† 2025 MAC tournament winner

The 2024–25 Bowling Green Falcons men's basketball team represented Bowling Green State University during the 2024–25 NCAA Division I men's basketball season. The Falcons, led by second-year head coach Todd Simon, played their home games at the Stroh Center in Bowling Green, Ohio as members of the Mid-American Conference.

== Previous season ==
The Falcons finished the 2023–24 season 19–12, 10–8 in MAC play to finish in fifth place. They defeated Central Michigan, before being upset by Kent State in the quarterfinals of the MAC tournament. They received an invitation to the CIT, where they would fall to eventual tournament runner-up Purdue Fort Wayne in the quarterfinals.

== Offseason ==
=== Departures ===
Departures
Name	Number	Pos.	Height	Weight	Year	Hometown	Reason for departure
Marcus Hill	0	G	6'4"	185	Junior	Rockford, Illinois	Transferred to NC State
DJ Smith	2	G	6'0"	160	Junior	North Little Rock, Arkansas	Transferred to Robert Morris
PJ Edwards	4	G	6'4"	200	Sophomore	Springfield, Illinois	Transferred to Grambling State
Da'Shawn Phillip	5	G	6'5"	180	Senior	Baltimore, Maryland	Graduated
Jason Spurgin	7	C	7'0"	250	Senior	Toowoomba, Australia	Graduated
Anthony McComb III	10	G	6'3"	180	Sophomore	Dayton, Ohio	Transferred to New Hampshire
Rashaun Agee	12	F	6'8"	225	Senior	Chicago, Illinois	Transferred to USC
EJay Greer	12	G	6'8"	170	Freshman	Lansdowne, Pennsylvania	Transferred to Alabama A&M
JZ Zaher	17	G	6'0"	170	Sophomore	Fenton, Michigan	Declared for the 2024 NBA draft

=== Incoming transfers ===
Incoming transfers
Name	Number	Pos.	Height	Weight	Year	Hometown	Previous school
Javontae Campbell	2	G	6'2"	155	Junior	Muskogee, Oklahoma	Northern Oklahoma
Braelon Green	5	G	6'3"	180	Sophomore	Southfield, Michigan	Arizona State
Marcus Johnson	6	F	6'7"	265	Senior	Akron, Ohio	Wheeling
Wilguens Jr. Exacte	7	F	6'6"	236	Sophomore	Montreal, Quebec	Utah
Derrick Butler	10	G	6'2"	195	Senior	Charlotte, North Carolina	Central Michigan
Mohamed Maxamud	12	F	6'10"	190	Junior	Westerville, Ohio	Labette Community College
Preston Squire	13	F	6'11"	225	Sophomore	Ephraim, Utah	Salt Lake Community College
Youssef Khayat	23	F	6'9"	215	Junior	Beirut, Lebanon	Michigan

=== Recruiting class ===
College recruiting information
Name	Hometown	School	Height	Weight	Commit date
Jaxon Pardon; G	Fort Wayne, Indiana	Carroll High School	6 ft 4 in (1.93 m)	170 lb (77 kg)	
Jaxon Pardon; G	Recruit ratings: Rivals: 247Sports: ESPN: (N/A)				
Alijah Adem; G	Las Vegas, Nevada	Spring Valley High School	6 ft 2 in (1.88 m)	160 lb (73 kg)	
Alijah Adem; G	Recruit ratings: Rivals: 247Sports: ESPN: (N/A)				
Overall recruit ranking:
Note: In many cases, Scout, Rivals, 247Sports, On3, and ESPN may conflict in their listings of height and weight.; In these cases, the average was taken. ESPN grades are on a 100-point scale.; Sources: "2024 Team Ranking". Rivals.

== Preseason ==
On October 22, 2024, the MAC released the preseason coaches poll. Bowling Green was picked to finish fifth in the MAC regular season.

=== Preseason rankings ===
MAC preseason poll
Predicted finish	Team	Votes (1st place)
1	Ohio	121 (11)
2	Akron	106 (1)
3	Kent State	99
4	Toledo	95
5	Bowling Green	73
6	Miami (OH)	72
7	Ball State	67
8	Central Michigan	55
9	Eastern Michigan	36
10	Western Michigan	33
11	Northern Illinois	24
12	Buffalo	11

MAC Tournament Champions: Ohio (8), Kent State (3), Toledo (1)

=== Preseason All-MAC ===
No Falcons were named to the first or second Preseason All-MAC teams.

== Roster ==
2024–25 Bowling Green Falcons men's basketball team
Players
Coaches

Pos.	#	Name	Height	Weight	Year	Previous school	Hometown
G	0	Jaxon Pardon	6 ft 4 in (1.93 m)	170 lb (77 kg)	Fr	Carroll High School	Fort Wayne, Indiana
G	1	Trey Thomas	6 ft 0 in (1.83 m)	160 lb (73 kg)	Sr	Vanderbilt	Toronto, Ontario
G	2	Javontae Campbell	6 ft 2 in (1.88 m)	155 lb (70 kg)	Jr	Northern Oklahoma	Muskogee, Oklahoma
G	3	DaJion Humphrey	6 ft 4 in (1.93 m)	185 lb (84 kg)	Sr	Garden City Community College	Detroit, Michigan
G	5	Braelon Green	6 ft 3 in (1.91 m)	180 lb (82 kg)	So	Arizona State	Southfield, Michigan
F	6	Marcus Johnson	6 ft 7 in (2.01 m)	265 lb (120 kg)	Sr	Wheeling	Akron, Ohio
F	7	Wilguens Jr. Exacte	6 ft 6 in (1.98 m)	236 lb (107 kg)	So	Utah	Montreal, Quebec
F	8	Greg Spurgin	6 ft 7 in (2.01 m)	210 lb (95 kg)	Jr	Westminster	Toowoomba, Australia
G	10	Derrick Butler	6 ft 2 in (1.88 m)	195 lb (88 kg)	Sr	Central Michigan	Charlotte, North Carolina
F	11	Jamai Felt	6 ft 10 in (2.08 m)	210 lb (95 kg)	RS Fr	Our Saviour Lutheran School	Boston, Massachusetts
F	12	Mohamed Maxamud	6 ft 10 in (2.08 m)	190 lb (86 kg)	Jr	Labette Community College	Westerville, Ohio
F	13	Preston Squire	6 ft 11 in (2.11 m)	225 lb (102 kg)	So	Salt Lake Community College	Ephraim, Utah
F	14	Sam Towns	6 ft 9 in (2.06 m)	200 lb (91 kg)	Sr	Ohio	Columbus, Ohio
F	23	Youssef Khayat	6 ft 9 in (2.06 m)	215 lb (98 kg)	Jr	Michigan	Beirut, Lebanon
G	31	Alijah Adem	6 ft 2 in (1.88 m)	160 lb (73 kg)	Fr	Spring Valley High School	Las Vegas, Nevada

Head coach

- Todd Simon (Central Michigan)

Assistant coach(es)

- Lourawls Nairn Jr. (Michigan State)
- Bryce Martin (Boise State)
- German Srulovich (San Francisco)
- Bob Gallager (St. Bonaventure)
- Jason Newkirk (Olivet Nazarene)

Legend

- (C) Team captain
- (S) Suspended
- (I) Ineligible
- (W) Walk-on
- Injured
- Current redshirt

Roster
Last update: November 18, 2024

== Schedule and results ==
Date time, TV	Rank^{#}	Opponent^{#}	Result	Record	High points	High rebounds	High assists	Site (attendance) city, state
Non-conference regular season
November 4, 2024*; 8:00 pm, ESPN+		at Southern Miss; MAC-SBC Challenge	L 68–77	0–1	17 – Tied	10 – Towns	4 – Campbell	Reed Green Coliseum (3,436); Hattiesburg, MS
November 8, 2024*; 7:00 pm, ESPN+		Davidson	L 85–91	0–2	30 – Campbell	11 – Towns	3 – Thomas	Stroh Center (1,960); Bowling Green, OH
November 11, 2024*; 7:00 pm, ESPN+		Taylor	W 107–43	1–2	19 – Johnson	8 – Tied	4 – Green	Stroh Center (867); Bowling Green, OH
November 16, 2024*; 6:00 pm, BTN		at Michigan State	L 72–86	1–3	23 – Johnson	5 – Johnson	2 – Tied	Breslin Center (14,797); East Lansing, MI
November 19, 2024*; 7:00 pm, ESPN+		Niagara	W 76–68	2–3	24 – Johnson	5 – Tied	4 – Campbell	Stroh Center (1,632); Bowling Green, OH
November 23, 2024*; 3:00 pm, ESPN+		at Bellarmine	L 68–80	2–4	21 – Campbell	6 – Johnson	4 – Thomas	Knights Hall (1,282); Louisville, KY
November 29, 2024*; 1:00 pm		vs. Weber State; Arizona Tip-Off Desert Division semifinals	L 70–73	2–5	16 – Butler	7 – Felt	2 – Tied	Mullett Arena; Tempe, AZ
November 30, 2024*; 2:00 pm		vs. New Mexico State; Arizona Tip-Off Desert Division 3rd place game	W 61–60	3–5	23 – Johnson	12 – Felt	3 – Johnson	Mullett Arena; Tempe, AZ
December 7, 2024*; 2:00 pm, ESPN+		Morgan State	W 102–81	4–5	35 – Butler	8 – Campbell	5 – Tied	Stroh Center (1,704); Bowling Green, OH
December 14, 2024*; 8:00 pm, SL Network		at Kansas City	L 77–85	4–6	27 – Campbell	5 – Butler	2 – Tied	Swinney Recreation Center (725); Kansas City, MO
December 21, 2024*; 2:00 pm, ESPN+		St. Thomas	L 68–93	4–7	18 – Campbell	6 – Tied	2 – Exacte	Stroh Center (1,998); Bowling Green, OH
December 23, 2024*; 3:00 pm, ESPN+		Aquinas	W 87–62	5–7	20 – Johnson	11 – Tied	10 – Campbell	Stroh Center (2,098); Bowling Green, OH
MAC regular season
January 3, 2025; 6:00 pm, CBSSN		Akron	L 68–71	5–8 (0–1)	19 – Thomas	10 – Felt	4 – Campbell	Stroh Center (2,892); Bowling Green, OH
January 7, 2025; 7:00 pm, ESPN+		at Western Michigan	W 83–79	6–8 (1–1)	22 – Thomas	7 – Tied	3 – Tied	University Arena (1,383); Kalamazoo, MI
January 11, 2025; 2:00 pm, ESPN+		at Ball State	L 69–91	6–9 (1–2)	13 – Campbell	6 – Johnson	4 – Green	Worthen Arena (4,256); Muncie, IN
January 14, 2025; 7:00 pm, ESPN+		Buffalo	W 79–61	7–9 (2–2)	22 – Thomas	9 – Johnson	3 – Johnson	Stroh Center (1,639); Bowling Green, OH
January 18, 2025; 2:00 pm, ESPN+		Eastern Michigan	L 62–68	7–10 (2–3)	18 – Johnson	10 – Felt	2 – Campbell	Stroh Center (1,981); Bowling Green, OH
January 21, 2025; 7:00 pm, ESPN+		at Miami (OH)	L 76–84	7–11 (2–4)	17 – Tied	6 – Tied	7 – Thomas	Millett Hall (1,175); Oxford, OH
January 24, 2025; 6:00 pm, CBSSN		Toledo	L 71–84	7–12 (2–5)	28 – Johnson	12 – Felt	3 – Tied	Stroh Center (4,072); Bowling Green, OH
January 28, 2025; 7:00 pm, ESPN+		at Kent State	L 57–75	7–13 (2–6)	21 – Johnson	6 – Johnson	2 – Butler	MAC Center (1,988); Kent, OH
February 1, 2025; 7:00 pm, ESPN+		at Central Michigan	L 71–90	7–14 (2–7)	17 – Campbell	7 – Felt	3 – Green	McGuirk Arena (2,057); Mount Pleasant, MI
February 4, 2025; 7:00 pm, ESPN+		Northern Illinois	W 84–77	8–14 (3–7)	22 – Johnson	13 – Johnson	5 – Thomas	Stroh Center (1,572); Bowling Green, OH
February 8, 2025*; 2:00 pm, ESPN+		Coastal Carolina; MAC-Sun Belt Challenge	W 67–53	9–14	21 – Butler	11 – Felt	5 – Green	Stroh Center (1,648); Bowling Green, OH
February 11, 2025; 7:00 pm, ESPN+		Ohio	L 81–86	9–15 (3–8)	21 – Johnson	10 – Felt	5 – Johnson	Stroh Center (1,912); Bowling Green, OH
February 15, 2025; 2:00 pm, ESPN+		at Buffalo	W 63–59	10–15 (4–8)	20 – Campbell	9 – Exacte	2 – Tied	Alumni Arena (1,534); Amherst, NY
February 18, 2025; 7:00 pm, ESPN+		Kent State	L 84–91	10–16 (4–9)	26 – Campbell	10 – Campbell	5 – Campbell	Stroh Center (1,418); Bowling Green, OH
February 21, 2025; 6:00 pm, CBSSN		at Toledo	W 69–68	11–16 (5–9)	23 – Campbell	12 – Exacte	4 – Exacte	Savage Arena (6,837); Toledo, OH
February 25, 2025; 6:30 pm, ESPN+		at Eastern Michigan	W 65–60	12–16 (6–9)	25 – Campbell	5 – Tied	7 – Campbell	George Gervin GameAbove Center (1,546); Ypsilanti, MI
March 1, 2025; 2:00 pm, ESPN+		Ball State	W 61–52	13–16 (7–9)	26 – Campbell	9 – Tied	3 – Tied	Stroh Center (2,125); Bowling Green, OH
March 4, 2025; 7:00 pm, ESPN+		at Northern Illinois	W 71–58	14–16 (8–9)	19 – Campbell	8 – Campbell	4 – Tied	Convocation Center (1,223); DeKalb, IL
March 7, 2025; 7:00 pm, ESPN+		Western Michigan	L 63–64	14–17 (8–10)	20 – Tied	8 – Felt	7 – Campbell	Stroh Center (2,992); Bowling Green, OH
MAC tournament
March 13, 2025; 11:00 am, ESPN+	(8)	vs. (1) Akron; Quarterfinals	L 67–96	14–18	23 – Johnson	7 – Tied	4 – Campbell	Rocket Mortgage FieldHouse; Cleveland, OH
*Non-conference game. ^{#}Rankings from AP Poll. (#) Tournament seedings in parentheses. All times are in Eastern.
