= 2024–25 Northern Illinois Huskies men's basketball team =

American college basketball season

2024–25 Northern Illinois Huskies men's basketball
- Conference: Mid-American Conference
- Record: 6–25 (2–16 MAC)
- Head coach: Rashon Burno (4th season)
- Associate head coach: Drew Gladstone
- Assistant coaches: Drew Kelly; Jacob Kurtz; Antoni Wyche; Cyrus Tate
- Home arena: Convocation Center

2024–25 Mid-American Conference men's basketball standings
	Conf.				Overall
Team	W		L	PCT	W		L	PCT
Akron †	17	–	1	.944	28	–	7	.800
Miami (OH)	14	–	4	.778	25	–	9	.735
Kent State	11	–	7	.611	24	–	12	.667
Toledo	10	–	8	.556	18	–	15	.545
Ohio	10	–	8	.556	16	–	16	.500
Western Michigan	9	–	9	.500	12	–	20	.375
Eastern Michigan	9	–	9	.500	16	–	16	.500
Bowling Green	8	–	10	.444	14	–	18	.438
Ball State	7	–	11	.389	14	–	17	.452
Central Michigan	7	–	11	.389	14	–	17	.452
Buffalo	4	–	14	.222	9	–	22	.290
Northern Illinois	2	–	16	.111	6	–	25	.194
† 2025 MAC tournament winner

The 2024–25 Northern Illinois Huskies men's basketball team represented Northern Illinois University during the 2024–25 NCAA Division I men's basketball season. The Huskies, led by fourth-year head coach Rashon Burno, played their home games at the Convocation Center in DeKalb, Illinois as members of the Mid-American Conference (MAC). They finished the season 6–25, 2–16 in MAC play to finish in last place. They failed to qualify for the MAC tournament.

== Previous season ==
The Huskies finished the 2023–24 season 11–20, 5–13 in MAC play, to finish in 11th place. They failed to qualify for the MAC tournament, as only the top eight teams qualify.

== Offseason ==
=== Departures ===
Departures
Name	Number	Pos.	Height	Weight	Year	Hometown	Reason for departure
Keshawn Williams	0	G	6' 4"	175	Senior	Chicago Heights, IL	Transferred to Colorado State
Will Lovings-Watts	1	G	6' 5"	200	Freshman	Jeffersonville, IN	Transferred to James Madison
Zarique Nutter	2	G	6' 7"	200	Junior	Newark, NJ	Transferred to Georgia State
Philmon Gebrewhit	5	G	6' 7"	190	Senior	Boston, MA	Graduated
Zion Russell	10	G	6' 2"	185	RS Sophomore	Upper Marlboro, MD	Transferred to Niagara
David Coit	11	G	5' 11"	175	Junior	Columbus, NJ	Transferred to Kansas
Xavier Amos	13	F	6' 8"	215	Sophomore	Chicago, IL	Transferred to Wisconsin
Yanic Konan Niederhäuser	14	F	6' 11"	255	Sophomore	Fräschels, Switzerland	Transferred to Penn State
Luka Gogic	21	F	6' 6"	190	Freshman	Belgrade, Serbia	
Harvin Ibarguen	23	F	6' 9"	235	Senior	Cali, Colombia	Graduated

=== Incoming transfers ===
Incoming transfers
Name	Number	Pos.	Height	Weight	Year	Hometown	Previous school
Dominic Gooden	0	G	6' 1"	180	Junior	Cleveland, OH	Hillsborough CC
Quentin Jones	1	G	6' 5"	180	Sophomore	Chicago, IL	Cal Poly
Tsvet Sotirov	2	F	6' 9"	210	RS Freshman	Rolling Meadows, IL	Saint Louis
Joe Munden Jr.	3	G	6' 4"	199	Graduate student	Harlem, NY	Fairleigh Dickinson
Kailon Nicholls	5	G	6' 0"	160	Sophomore	Toronto, ON	Duquesne
Peyton Ackerman	12	G	5' 10"	150	RS Sophomore	Oklahoma City, OK	Grayson College
James Dent Jr.	14	G	6' 5"	170	Senior	Springfield, IL	Western Illinois
Mo Sall	23	G	6' 5"	185	Junior	Downers Grove, IL	DePaul

=== Recruiting class ===
College recruiting information
Name	Hometown	School	Height	Weight	Commit date
Jayden Mott; F	Midwest City, OK	Edmond Santa Fe High School	6 ft 8 in (2.03 m)	210 lb (95 kg)	
Jayden Mott; F	Recruit ratings: Rivals: 247Sports: ESPN: (N/A)				
David Mack; G	Los Angeles, CA	St. Pius X - St. Matthias Academy	5 ft 10 in (1.78 m)	160 lb (73 kg)	
David Mack; G	Recruit ratings: Rivals: 247Sports: ESPN: (N/A)				
Terry Copeland Jr. F	Orange, NJ	Legacy Early College	6 ft 9 in (2.06 m)	225 lb (102 kg)	
Terry Copeland Jr. F	Recruit ratings: Rivals: 247Sports: ESPN: (N/A)				
Overall recruit ranking:
Note: In many cases, Scout, Rivals, 247Sports, On3, and ESPN may conflict in their listings of height and weight.; In these cases, the average was taken. ESPN grades are on a 100-point scale.; Sources: "2024 Team Ranking". Rivals.

== Preseason ==
On October 22, 2024 the MAC released the preseason coaches poll. Northern Illinois was picked to finish eleventh in the MAC regular season.

=== Preseason rankings ===
MAC preseason poll
Predicted finish	Team	Votes (1st place)
1	Ohio	121 (11)
2	Akron	106 (1)
3	Kent State	99
4	Toledo	95
5	Bowling Green	73
6	Miami (OH)	72
7	Ball State	67
8	Central Michigan	55
9	Eastern Michigan	36
10	Western Michigan	33
11	Northern Illinois	24
12	Buffalo	11

MAC tournament champions: Ohio (8), Kent State (3), Toledo (1)

=== Preseason All-MAC ===
No Huskies were named to the first or second Preseason All-MAC teams.

== Roster ==
2024–25 Northern Illinois Huskies men's basketball team
Players
Coaches

Pos.	#	Name	Height	Weight	Year	Previous school	Hometown
G	0	Dominic Gooden	6 ft 1 in (1.85 m)	180 lb (82 kg)	Jr	Hillsborough Community College	Cleveland, OH
G	1	Quentin Jones	6 ft 5 in (1.96 m)	180 lb (82 kg)	So	Cal Poly	Chicago, IL
F	2	Tsvet Sotirov	6 ft 9 in (2.06 m)	210 lb (95 kg)	RS Fr	Saint Louis	Rolling Meadows, IL
G	3	Joe Jr. Munden	6 ft 4 in (1.93 m)	199 lb (90 kg)	GS	Fairleigh Dickinson	Harlem, NY
F	4	Oluwasegun Durosinmi	6 ft 9 in (2.06 m)	243 lb (110 kg)	Sr	St. Bonaventure	Lagos, Nigeria
G	5	Kailon Nicholls	6 ft 0 in (1.83 m)	160 lb (73 kg)	So	Duquesne	Toronto, ON
G	7	Nasir Muhammad	6 ft 2 in (1.88 m)	186 lb (84 kg)	So	Xaverian High School	Brooklyn, NY
F	11	Jayden Mott	6 ft 8 in (2.03 m)	210 lb (95 kg)	Fr	Edmond Santa Fe High School	Midwest City, OK
G	12	Peyton Ackerman	5 ft 10 in (1.78 m)	150 lb (68 kg)	RS So	Grayson College	Oklahoma City, OK
G	14	James Jr. Dent	6 ft 5 in (1.96 m)	170 lb (77 kg)	Sr	Western Illinois	Springfield, IL
F	15	Ethan Butler	6 ft 7 in (2.01 m)	220 lb (100 kg)	Jr	Oregon	Toronto, ON
G	20	Leo IV Amari	6 ft 2 in (1.88 m)	170 lb (77 kg)	So	Viewpoint School	Sherman Oaks, CA
G	21	David Mack	5 ft 10 in (1.78 m)	160 lb (73 kg)	Fr	St. Pius X - St. Matthias Academy	Los Angeles, CA
G	22	Steven Tipton	6 ft 2 in (1.88 m)	183 lb (83 kg)	Jr	Brookfield Central High School	Brookfield, WI
G	23	Mo Sall	6 ft 5 in (1.96 m)	185 lb (84 kg)	Jr	DePaul	Downers Grove, IL
G	24	Quaran McPherson	6 ft 4 in (1.93 m)	197 lb (89 kg)	Jr	Nebraska	South Jamaica, NY
F	25	Terry Jr. Copeland	6 ft 9 in (2.06 m)	225 lb (102 kg)	Fr	Legacy Early College	Orange, NJ

Head coach

- Rashon Burno (DePaul)

Assistant coach(es)

- Drew Gladstone (DePaul)
- Drew Kelly (Villanova)
- Jacob Kurtz (Florida)
- Antoni Wyche (Notre Dame)
- Cyrus Tate (Iowa)

Legend

- (C) Team captain
- (S) Suspended
- (I) Ineligible
- (W) Walk-on
- Injured
- Current redshirt

Roster
Last update: November 13, 2024

== Schedule and results ==
Date time, TV	Rank^{#}	Opponent^{#}	Result	Record	High points	High rebounds	High assists	Site (attendance) city, state
Non-conference regular season
November 4, 2024*; 6:00 p.m., ESPN+		at Georgia Southern; MAC–SBC Challenge	L 65–80	0–1	24 – Dent Jr.	6 – Tied	3 – Tied	Hanner Fieldhouse (2,520); Statesboro, GA
November 7, 2024*; 6:00 p.m., ESPN+		Holy Cross (IN)	W 105–37	1–1	14 – Tied	7 – Dent Jr.	4 – Tied	Convocation Center (921); DeKalb, IL
November 12, 2024*; 6:00 p.m., ESPN+		Monmouth	W 79–66	2–1	22 – Jones	8 – Dent Jr.	3 – Muhammad	Convocation Center (1,033); DeKalb, IL
November 16, 2024*; 7:00 p.m., ESPN+		at Bradley	L 60–76	2–2	19 – Jones	5 – Tied	2 – Tied	Carver Arena (6,094); Peoria, IL
November 20, 2024*; 6:00 p.m., ESPN+		Elon	L 48–75	2–3	16 – Dent Jr.	8 – Munden Jr.	4 – Dent Jr.	Convocation Center (1,081); DeKalb, IL
November 23, 2024*; 4:00 p.m., FS2		at DePaul; DePaul Classic Multi-Team Event	L 52–98	2–4	16 – Jones	6 – Tied	4 – Dent Jr.	Wintrust Arena (3,593); Chicago, IL
November 27, 2024*; 3:00 p.m., ESPN+		at Valparaiso; DePaul Classic Multi-Team Event	L 82–87	2–5	21 – Muhammad	11 – McPherson	4 – Dent Jr.	Athletics–Recreation Center (1,428); Valparaiso, IN
November 29, 2024*; 2:00 p.m., ESPN+		at Eastern Illinois; DePaul Classic Multi-Team Event	L 59–72	2–6	20 – Dent Jr.	9 – Dent Jr.	4 – Jones	Groniger Arena (715); Charleston, IL
December 3, 2024*; 6:00 p.m., ESPN+		Benedictine (IL)	W 89–70	3–6	20 – McPherson	9 – McPherson	5 – Dent Jr.	Convocation Center (961); DeKalb, IL
December 7, 2024*; 5:00 p.m., ESPN+		at Northern Iowa	L 57–101	3–7	14 – Munden Jr.	6 – Jones	2 – Tied	McLeod Center (3,742); Cedar Falls, IA
December 18, 2024*; 7:00 p.m., ESPN+		at Illinois State	L 60–81	3–8	27 – Jones	5 – Dent Jr.	4 – Dent Jr.	CEFCU Arena (2,927); Normal, IL
December 30, 2024*; 6:00 p.m., ESPN+		East–West	W 117–50	4–8	25 – Tied	11 – Tied	11 – Jones	Convocation Center (1,532); DeKalb, IL
Conference regular season
January 4, 2025; 1:00 p.m., ESPN+		at Eastern Michigan	L 71–75	4–9 (0–1)	15 – Dent Jr.	8 – Dent Jr.	4 – Dent Jr.	George Gervin GameAbove Center (1,535); Ypsilanti, MI
January 7, 2025; 6:00 p.m., ESPN+		Kent State	L 50–68	4–10 (0–2)	23 – Dent Jr.	8 – McPherson	6 – Jones	Convocation Center (1,004); DeKalb, IL
January 11, 2025; 12:00 p.m., ESPN+		at Ohio	L 70–108	4–11 (0–3)	25 – Jones	8 – Jones	5 – Jones	Convocation Center (4,011); Athens, OH
January 14, 2025; 6:00 p.m., ESPN+		Miami (OH)	L 69–84	4–12 (0–4)	21 – Jones	6 – Sotirov	4 – Dent Jr.	Convocation Center (1,244); DeKalb, IL
January 18, 2025; 1:00 p.m., ESPN+		Central Michigan	L 66–71	4–13 (0–5)	22 – McPherson	7 – Tied	4 – Jones	Convocation Center (1,320); DeKalb, IL
January 21, 2025; 6:00 p.m., ESPN+		at Western Michigan	L 70–72	4–14 (0–6)	18 – Dent Jr.	9 – McPherson	7 – Jones	University Arena (1,232); Kalamazoo, MI
January 25, 2025; 3:30 p.m., ESPN+		Ball State	W 76–66	5–14 (1–6)	19 – Muhammad	10 – Tied	6 – Jones	Convocation Center (2,565); DeKalb, IL
January 28, 2025; 6:00 p.m., ESPN+		Akron	L 70–80	5–15 (1–7)	25 – Jones	6 – Tied	5 – Dent Jr.	Convocation Center (1,059); DeKalb, IL
February 1, 2025; 1:00 p.m., ESPN+		at Toledo	L 85–89	5–16 (1–8)	21 – Muhammad	7 – McPherson	5 – Muhammad	Savage Arena (5,057); Toledo, OH
February 4, 2025; 6:00 p.m., ESPN+		at Bowling Green	L 77–84	5–17 (1–9)	19 – Jones	7 – Dent Jr.	5 – Jones	Stroh Center (1,572); Bowling Green, OH
February 8, 2025*; 1:00 p.m., ESPN+		Louisiana; MAC–SBC Challenge	L 64–66	5–18	19 – McPherson	8 – Jones	4 – Jones	Convocation Center (1,278); DeKalb, IL
February 11, 2025; 6:00 p.m., ESPN+		Buffalo	L 67–73	5–19 (1–10)	18 – Jones	7 – Tied	3 – Jones	Convocation Center (1,014); DeKalb, IL
February 15, 2025; 1:00 p.m., ESPN+		at Ball State	L 83–89 ^{OT}	5–20 (1–11)	21 – Jones	9 – Jones	6 – Jones	Worthen Arena (3,825); Muncie, IN
February 18, 2025; 6:00 p.m., ESPN+		at Akron	L 63–73	5–21 (1–12)	28 – Jones	7 – Jones	4 – Dent Jr.	James A. Rhodes Arena (3,472); Akron, OH
February 22, 2025; 3:30 p.m., ESPN+		Eastern Michigan	L 76–79	5–22 (1–13)	20 – Jones	8 – Jones	4 – Tied	Convocation Center (2,983); DeKalb, IL
February 25, 2025; 6:00 p.m., ESPN+		at Miami (OH)	L 58–87	5–23 (1–14)	17 – Muhammad	6 – Dent Jr.	4 – Dent Jr.	Millett Hall (2,197); Oxford, OH
March 1, 2025; 3:30 p.m., ESPN+		Western Michigan	L 70–74	5–24 (1–15)	25 – Jones	8 – Tied	6 – Dent Jr.	Convocation Center (2,484); DeKalb, IL
March 4, 2025; 6:00 p.m., ESPN+		Bowling Green	L 58–71	5–25 (1–16)	18 – Jones	7 – Dent Jr.	6 – Dent Jr.	Convocation Center (1,223); DeKalb, IL
March 7, 2025; 6:00 p.m., ESPN+		at Central Michigan	W 83–81 ^{2OT}	6–25 (2–16)	36 – Dent Jr.	9 – Tied	4 – Tipton	McGuirk Arena (1,432); Mount Pleasant, MI
*Non-conference game. ^{#}Rankings from AP poll. (#) Tournament seedings in parentheses. All times are in Central.
