= 2024–25 Ball State Cardinals men's basketball team =

American college basketball season

2024–25 Ball State Cardinals men's basketball
- Conference: Mid-American Conference
- Record: 14–17 (7–11 MAC)
- Head coach: Michael Lewis (3rd season)
- Associate head coach: Lou Gudino (3rd season)
- Assistant coaches: Ben Botts (7th season); Justin Brown (1st season); Buzzy Caruthers (1st season)
- Home arena: Worthen Arena

2024–25 Mid-American Conference men's basketball standings
	Conf.				Overall
Team	W		L	PCT	W		L	PCT
Akron †	17	–	1	.944	28	–	7	.800
Miami (OH)	14	–	4	.778	25	–	9	.735
Kent State	11	–	7	.611	24	–	12	.667
Toledo	10	–	8	.556	18	–	15	.545
Ohio	10	–	8	.556	16	–	16	.500
Western Michigan	9	–	9	.500	12	–	20	.375
Eastern Michigan	9	–	9	.500	16	–	16	.500
Bowling Green	8	–	10	.444	14	–	18	.438
Ball State	7	–	11	.389	14	–	17	.452
Central Michigan	7	–	11	.389	14	–	17	.452
Buffalo	4	–	14	.222	9	–	22	.290
Northern Illinois	2	–	16	.111	6	–	25	.194
† 2025 MAC tournament winner

The 2024–25 Ball State Cardinals men's basketball team represented Ball State University during the 2024–25 NCAA Division I men's basketball season. The Cardinals, led by third-year head coach Michael Lewis, played their home games at Worthen Arena in Muncie, Indiana as members of the Mid-American Conference (MAC).

== Previous season ==
The Cardinals finished the 2023–24 season 15–16, 7–11 in MAC play, to finish in ninth place. They failed to qualify for the MAC tournament, as only the top eight teams qualify.

== Offseason ==
=== Departures ===
Departures
Name	Number	Pos.	Height	Weight	Year	Hometown	Reason for departure
Jalin Anderson	1	G	6' 3"	190	Junior	Jackson, TN	Transferred to Incarnate Word
Micah Bell	4	G	6' 3"	168	RS Freshman	Austell, GA	Transferred to South Plains College
Davion Bailey	5	G	6' 4"	200	Junior	Indianapolis, IN	Transferred to Incarnate Word
Basheer Jihad	11	F	6' 9"	239	Junior	Detroit, MI	Transferred to Arizona State
Trent Middleton Jr.	13	G	6' 3"	177	Freshman	Philadelphia, PA	Transferred to Delaware
Jack Futa	14	G	6' 5"	189	Sophomore	South Bend, IN	Transferred to Aquinas College
Quincy Adams	15	G	6' 5"	172	RS Freshman	Frisco, TX	Transferred to Western New Mexico
Joey Brown	23	G	6' 5"	184	Freshman	Indianapolis, IN	Transferred to Tyler Junior College

=== Incoming transfers ===
Incoming transfers
Name	Number	Pos.	Height	Weight	Year	Hometown	Previous school
Jermahri Hill	1	G	6' 5"	185	Junior	Bessemer, AL	South Plains College
Juanse Gorosito	4	G	6' 1"	190	Junior	Ceres, Argentina	Portland
Payton Sparks	5	C	6' 10"	265	Senior	Winchester, IN	Indiana
Joey Hart	20	G	6' 5"	195	Sophomore	Linton, IN	Kentucky
Jeremiah Hernandez	33	G	6' 5"	192	Graduate student	Chicago, IL	Southern Indiana

=== Recruiting class ===
College recruiting information
Name	Hometown	School	Height	Weight	Commit date
Jai Anthoni Bearden; F	Phoenix, AZ	Sunnyslope High School	6 ft 6 in (1.98 m)	185 lb (84 kg)	
Jai Anthoni Bearden; F	Recruit ratings: Rivals: 247Sports: ESPN: (N/A)				
Kody Clancy; G	Scottsburg, IN	Scottsburg High School	6 ft 4 in (1.93 m)	191 lb (87 kg)	
Kody Clancy; G	Recruit ratings: Rivals: 247Sports: ESPN: (N/A)				
TJ Burch; G	Dallas, TX	Texas Alliance of Christian Athletes	6 ft 1 in (1.85 m)	170 lb (77 kg)	
TJ Burch; G	Recruit ratings: Rivals: 247Sports: ESPN: (N/A)				
Overall recruit ranking:
Note: In many cases, Scout, Rivals, 247Sports, On3, and ESPN may conflict in their listings of height and weight.; In these cases, the average was taken. ESPN grades are on a 100-point scale.; Sources: "2024 Team Ranking". Rivals.

== Preseason ==
On October 22, 2024, the MAC released the preseason coaches poll. Ball State was picked to finish seventh in the MAC regular season.

=== Preseason rankings ===
MAC preseason poll
Predicted finish	Team	Votes (1st place)
1	Ohio	121 (11)
2	Akron	106 (1)
3	Kent State	99
4	Toledo	95
5	Bowling Green	73
6	Miami (OH)	72
7	Ball State	67
8	Central Michigan	55
9	Eastern Michigan	36
10	Western Michigan	33
11	Northern Illinois	24
12	Buffalo	11

MAC tournament champions: Ohio (8), Kent State (3), Toledo (1)

=== Preseason All-MAC ===
Preseason All-MAC teams
Team	Player	Position	Year
1st	Payton Sparks	Center	Senior

== Roster ==
2024–25 Ball State Cardinals men's basketball team
Players
Coaches

Pos.	#	Name	Height	Weight	Year	Previous school	Hometown
G	1	Jermahri Hill	6 ft 5 in (1.96 m)	185 lb (84 kg)	Jr	South Plains College	Bessemer, AL
G	2	Ethan Brittain-Watts	6 ft 1 in (1.85 m)	205 lb (93 kg)	GS	Boston University	Indianapolis, IN
F	3	Mickey Jr. Pearson	6 ft 8 in (2.03 m)	205 lb (93 kg)	RS Sr	TCU	Lincoln, AL
G	4	Juanse Gorosito	6 ft 1 in (1.85 m)	190 lb (86 kg)	Jr	Portland	Ceres, Argentina
C	5	Payton Sparks	6 ft 10 in (2.08 m)	265 lb (120 kg)	Sr	Indiana	Winchester, IN
F	10	Jai Anthoni Bearden	6 ft 6 in (1.98 m)	185 lb (84 kg)	Fr	Sunnyslope High School	Phoenix, AZ
G	11	Kody Clancy	6 ft 4 in (1.93 m)	191 lb (87 kg)	Fr	Scottsburg High School	Scottsburg, IN
G	12	Jurica Zagorsak	6 ft 8 in (2.03 m)	235 lb (107 kg)	So	Gimnazija Jurja Barakovica	Zadar, Croatia
G	20	Joey Hart	6 ft 5 in (1.96 m)	195 lb (88 kg)	So	Kentucky	Linton, IN
G	22	TJ Burch	6 ft 1 in (1.85 m)	170 lb (77 kg)	Fr	Texas Alliance of Christian Athletes	Dallas, TX
F	24	Mason Jones	6 ft 7 in (2.01 m)	229 lb (104 kg)	So	Valparaiso High School	Valparaiso, IN
G	33	Jeremiah Hernandez	6 ft 5 in (1.96 m)	192 lb (87 kg)	GS	Southern Indiana	Chicago, IL
C	34	Ben Hendriks	6 ft 10 in (2.08 m)	248 lb (112 kg)	RS Sr	Orangeville Prep	Mississauga, ON
C	54	Zane Doughty	6 ft 9 in (2.06 m)	242 lb (110 kg)	So	Ben Davis High School	Indianapolis, IN

Head coach

- Michael Lewis (Indiana)

Assistant coach(es)

- Lou Gudino (Indiana)
- Ben Botts (Purdue Fort Wayne)
- Justin Brown (Southwest Baptist)
- Buzzy Caruthers (Hampton)

Legend

- (C) Team captain
- (S) Suspended
- (I) Ineligible
- (W) Walk-on
- Injured
- Current redshirt

Roster
Last update: November 14, 2024

== Schedule and results ==
Date time, TV	Rank^{#}	Opponent^{#}	Result	Record	High points	High rebounds	High assists	Site (attendance) city, state
Non-conference regular season
November 4, 2024*; 7:00 p.m., ESPN+		at Georgia State; MAC–SBC Challenge	L 66–71	0–1	17 – Hill	13 – Pearson Jr.	4 – Sparks	GSU Convocation Center (532); Atlanta, GA
November 8, 2024*; 5:00 p.m., ESPN+		Franklin	W 87–60	1–1	17 – 3 tied	8 – Pearson Jr.	6 – Brittain-Watts	Worthen Arena (4,018); Muncie, IN
November 13, 2024*; 7:00 p.m., ESPN+		at Dayton	L 69–77	1–2	25 – Hill	7 – Hill	3 – Hill	UD Arena (13,407); Dayton, OH
November 16, 2024*; 2:00 p.m., ESPN+		Indiana State	L 84–94	1–3	16 – Sparks	7 – Sparks	4 – Brittain-Watts	Worthen Arena (4,021); Muncie, IN
November 20, 2024*; 7:00 p.m., ESPN+		Detroit Mercy	L 59–70	1–4	12 – 2 tied	11 – Pearson Jr.	3 – 2 tied	Worthen Arena (2,784); Muncie, IN
November 25, 2024*; 12:00 p.m., FloHoops		vs. Eastern Kentucky; Gulf Coast Showcase	W 63–61	2–4	18 – Hill	7 – Hill	4 – Hill	Hertz Arena (542); Estero, FL
November 26, 2024*; 6:00 p.m., FloHoops		vs. Florida Tech; Gulf Coast Showcase	W 94–57	3–4	24 – Hill	8 – Pearson Jr.	5 – Hill	Hertz Arena (289); Estero, FL
November 27, 2024*; 6:00 p.m., FloHoops		vs. Richmond; Gulf Coast Showcase	L 60–73	3–5	22 – Hill	6 – Sparks	2 – 2 tied	Hertz Arena (311); Estero, FL
December 8, 2024*; 2:00 p.m., ESPN+		at SIU Edwardsville	L 69–82	3–6	17 – Gorosito	6 – Hendriks	3 – 2 tied	First Community Arena (1,015); Edwardsville, IL
December 14, 2024*; 3:00 p.m., ESPN+		at Bellarmine	W 86–82	4–6	21 – Gorosito	4 – 3 tied	4 – tied	Knights Hall (1,572); Louisville, KY
December 21, 2024*; 2:00 p.m., ESPN+		Evansville	W 80–43	5–6	20 – Sparks	8 – Hill	3 – 2 tied	Worthen Arena (3,521); Muncie, IN
December 31, 2024*; 2:00 p.m., ESPN+		Anderson	W 89–76	6–6	25 – Hill	16 – Sparks	5 – 2 tied	Worthen Arena (3,421); Muncie, IN
MAC regular season
January 4, 2025; 1:00 p.m., ESPN+		at Kent State	W 75–67	7–6 (1–0)	18 – Hill	12 – Sparks	6 – Hill	MAC Center (1,608); Kent, OH
January 7, 2025; 7:00 p.m., ESPN+		Miami (OH)	L 72–80	7–7 (1–1)	20 – 2 tied	16 – Sparks	3 – 2 tied	Worthen Arena (3,512); Muncie, IN
January 11, 2025; 2:00 p.m., ESPN+		Bowling Green	W 91–69	8–7 (2–1)	19 – Sparks	13 – Sparks	6 – Hill	Worthen Arena (4,256); Muncie, IN
January 14, 2025; 7:00 p.m., ESPN+		at Ohio	L 71–86	8–8 (2–2)	19 – Pearson Jr.	12 – Sparks	3 – 3 tied	Convocation Center (4,624); Athens, OH
January 18, 2025; 2:00 p.m., ESPN+		Toledo	L 75–93	8–9 (2–3)	20 – Sparks	9 – Sparks	6 – Hill	Worthen Arena (4,412); Muncie, IN
January 21, 2025; 7:00 p.m., ESPN+		at Central Michigan	W 82–80	9–9 (3–3)	16 – Pearson Jr.	8 – Sparks	5 – Hill	McGuirk Arena (2,423); Mount Pleasant, MI
January 25, 2025; 4:30 p.m., ESPN+		at Northern Illinois	L 66–76	9–10 (3–4)	16 – Brittain-Watts	8 – Pearson Jr.	5 – Brittain-Watts	Convocation Center (2,565); DeKalb, IL
January 28, 2025; 7:00 p.m., ESPN+		Western Michigan	L 71–74	9–11 (3–5)	19 – 2 tied	17 – Sparks	4 – Hill	Worthen Arena (3,026); Muncie, IN
February 1, 2025; 5:00 p.m., ESPN+		at Buffalo	W 89–76	10–11 (4–5)	27 – Sparks	14 – Sparks	4 – Brittain-Watts	Alumni Arena (2,101); Amherst, NY
February 4, 2025; 7:00 p.m., ESPN+		at Akron	L 73–81	10–12 (4–6)	19 – Hill	7 – Hill	4 – Hill	James A. Rhodes Arena (1,883); Akron, OH
February 8, 2025*; 2:00 p.m., ESPN+		Southern Miss; MAC–SBC Challenge	W 77–76	11–12	21 – Pearson Jr.	12 – Sparks	4 – 2 tied	Worthen Arena (3,420); Muncie, IN
February 11, 2025; 7:00 p.m., ESPN+		Eastern Michigan	W 86–84 ^{OT}	12–12 (5–6)	21 – Hill	8 – Hill	7 – Hill	Worthen Arena (3,118); Muncie, IN
February 15, 2025; 2:00 p.m., ESPN+		Northern Illinois	W 89–83 ^{OT}	13–12 (6–6)	24 – Gorosito	7 – Gorosito	4 – Brittain-Watts	Worthen Arena (3,825); Muncie, IN
February 18, 2025; 7:00 p.m., ESPN+		at Toledo	L 66–67	13–13 (6–7)	16 – 2 tied	9 – Sparks	6 – Hill	Savage Arena (3,947); Toledo, OH
February 22, 2025; 2:00 p.m., ESPN+		Buffalo	W 80–66	14–13 (7–7)	18 – Sparks	11 – Hill	4 – Hill	Worthen Arena (5,276); Muncie, IN
February 25, 2025; 7:00 p.m., ESPN+		Akron	L 82–87	14–14 (7–8)	26 – Hill	9 – 2 tied	6 – Gorosito	Worthen Arena (3,210); Muncie, IN
March 1, 2025; 2:00 p.m., ESPN+		at Bowling Green	L 52–61	14–15 (7–9)	15 – Pearson Jr.	7 – Tied	2 – Tied	Stroh Center (2,125); Bowling Green, OH
March 4, 2025; 7:00 p.m., ESPN+		Central Michigan	L 67–69	14–16 (7–10)	21 – Hill	9 – Sparks	3 – Sparks	Worthen Arena (2,844); Muncie, IN
March 7, 2025; 6:00 p.m., ESPNU		at Miami (OH)	L 66–79	14–17 (7–11)	18 – Hill	11 – Tied	5 – Burch	Millett Hall (7,893); Oxford, OH
*Non-conference game. ^{#}Rankings from AP poll. (#) Tournament seedings in parentheses. All times are in Eastern.
