= 2024–25 Buffalo Bulls men's basketball team =

American college basketball season

2024–25 Buffalo Bulls men's basketball
- Conference: Mid-American Conference
- Record: 9–22 (4–14 MAC)
- Head coach: George Halcovage (2nd season)
- Assistant coaches: Hamlet Tibbs (2nd season); Jake Presutti (2nd season); Tim Saunders (2nd season); Jack Fitzpatrick (1st season); Kevin Voigt (1st season)
- Home arena: Alumni Arena

2024–25 Mid-American Conference men's basketball standings
	Conf.				Overall
Team	W		L	PCT	W		L	PCT
Akron †	17	–	1	.944	28	–	7	.800
Miami (OH)	14	–	4	.778	25	–	9	.735
Kent State	11	–	7	.611	24	–	12	.667
Toledo	10	–	8	.556	18	–	15	.545
Ohio	10	–	8	.556	16	–	16	.500
Western Michigan	9	–	9	.500	12	–	20	.375
Eastern Michigan	9	–	9	.500	16	–	16	.500
Bowling Green	8	–	10	.444	14	–	18	.438
Ball State	7	–	11	.389	14	–	17	.452
Central Michigan	7	–	11	.389	14	–	17	.452
Buffalo	4	–	14	.222	9	–	22	.290
Northern Illinois	2	–	16	.111	6	–	25	.194
† 2025 MAC tournament winner

The 2024–25 Buffalo Bulls men's basketball team represented the University at Buffalo during the 2024–25 NCAA Division I men's basketball season. The Bulls, led by second-year head coach George Halcovage III, played their home games at Alumni Arena located in Amherst, New York as members of the Mid-American Conference.

== Previous season ==
The Bulls finished the previous season 4–27, 2–16 in MAC play, to finish in last place. They failed to qualify for the MAC tournament.

== Offseason ==
=== Departures ===
Departures
Name	Number	Pos.	Height	Weight	Year	Hometown	Reason for departure
Kanye Jones	0	G	6'5"	190	Junior	Orlando, Florida	Transferred to USC Upstate
Sy Chatman	1	F	6'8"	227	Fifth Year	Minneapolis, Minnesota	Graduated
Isaiah Adams	3	F	6'6"	210	Senior	Jacksonville, Florida	Transferred to Toledo
Zaakir Williamson	5	F	6'7"	230	RS Sophomore	Philadelphia, Pennsylvania	Transferred to Saint Peter's
Shawn Fulcher	10	G	6'0"	170	Sophomore	Brooklyn, New York	Transferred to Alabama State
James Graham	12	G/F	6'7"	208	Junior	Milwaukee, Wisconsin	Transferred to Grambling State
Jonnivius Smith	15	F	6'9"	200	Senior	Selma, Alabama	Transferred to UTSA

=== Incoming transfers ===
Incoming transfers
Name	Number	Pos.	Height	Weight	Year	Hometown	Previous school
Noah Batchelor	1	G/F	6'8"	210	Junior	Frederick, Maryland	Maryland
Tyson Dunn	5	G	6'3"	190	Senior	Newmarket, Ontario	Western Ontario

=== Recruiting class ===
College recruiting information
Name	Hometown	School	Height	Weight	Commit date
Omar Migues-Hibeljic; G	Quebec City, Quebec	Collège Jean-de-Brébeuf	6 ft 5 in (1.96 m)	200 lb (91 kg)	
Omar Migues-Hibeljic; G	Recruit ratings: Rivals: 247Sports: ESPN: (N/A)				
Brayden Jackson; G	Milton, Ontario	Fort Erie International Academy	6 ft 8 in (2.03 m)	185 lb (84 kg)	
Brayden Jackson; G	Recruit ratings: Rivals: 247Sports: ESPN: (N/A)				
Ben Michaels; G	Ipswich, England	Long Island Lutheran High School	6 ft 8 in (2.03 m)	210 lb (95 kg)	
Ben Michaels; G	Recruit ratings: Rivals: 247Sports: ESPN: (N/A)				
Eric Kenesie Jr. G	Kenosha, Wisconsin	St. Joseph Catholic Academy	6 ft 0 in (1.83 m)	180 lb (82 kg)	
Eric Kenesie Jr. G	Recruit ratings: Rivals: 247Sports: ESPN: (N/A)				
Frederiks Meinarts; C/F	Riga, Latvia	IMG Academy	7 ft 0 in (2.13 m)	196 lb (89 kg)	
Frederiks Meinarts; C/F	Recruit ratings: Rivals: 247Sports: ESPN: (N/A)				
Sam Akot; G/F	London, Ontario	Notre Dame Catholic Secondary School	6 ft 7 in (2.01 m)	180 lb (82 kg)	
Sam Akot; G/F	Recruit ratings: Rivals: 247Sports: ESPN: (N/A)				
Kavon Bradford; G	Portland, Oregon	Western Canada Prep Academy	6 ft 2 in (1.88 m)	180 lb (82 kg)	
Kavon Bradford; G	Recruit ratings: Rivals: 247Sports: ESPN: (N/A)				
Tim Oboh; C	Orpington, England	The Canterbury Academy	6 ft 11 in (2.11 m)	230 lb (100 kg)	
Tim Oboh; C	Recruit ratings: Rivals: 247Sports: ESPN: (N/A)				
Overall recruit ranking:
Note: In many cases, Scout, Rivals, 247Sports, On3, and ESPN may conflict in their listings of height and weight.; In these cases, the average was taken. ESPN grades are on a 100-point scale.; Sources: "Buffalo 2024 Basketball Commitments". Rivals.; "2024 Team Ranking". Rivals.

== Preseason ==
On October 22, 2024 the MAC released the preseason coaches poll. Buffalo was picked to finish last in the MAC regular season.

=== Preseason rankings ===
MAC preseason poll
Predicted finish	Team	Votes (1st place)
1	Ohio	121 (11)
2	Akron	106 (1)
3	Kent State	99
4	Toledo	95
5	Bowling Green	73
6	Miami (OH)	72
7	Ball State	67
8	Central Michigan	55
9	Eastern Michigan	36
10	Western Michigan	33
11	Northern Illinois	24
12	Buffalo	11

MAC Tournament Champions: Ohio (8), Kent State (3), Toledo (1)

=== Preseason All-MAC ===
No Bulls were named to the first or second Preseason All-MAC teams.

== Roster ==
2024–25 Buffalo Bulls men's basketball team
Players
Coaches

Pos.	#	Name	Height	Weight	Year	Previous school	Hometown
G	0	Omar Migues-Hibeljic	6 ft 5 in (1.96 m)	200 lb (91 kg)	Fr	Collège Jean-de-Brébeuf	Quebec City, Quebec
G/F	1	Noah Batchelor	6 ft 8 in (2.03 m)	210 lb (95 kg)	Jr	Maryland	Frederick, Maryland
G	2	Ryan Sabol	6 ft 3 in (1.91 m)	195 lb (88 kg)	So	Gonzaga College High School	Washington, D.C.
G	4	Anquan Boldin Jr.	6 ft 4 in (1.93 m)	194 lb (88 kg)	So	IMG Academy	Delray Beach, Florida
G	5	Tyson Dunn	6 ft 3 in (1.91 m)	190 lb (86 kg)	Sr	Western Ontario	Newmarket, Ontario
G	7	Brayden Jackson	6 ft 8 in (2.03 m)	185 lb (84 kg)	Fr	Fort Erie International Academy	Milton, Ontario
F	8	Ben Michaels	6 ft 8 in (2.03 m)	210 lb (95 kg)	Fr	Long Island Lutheran High School	Ipswich, England
G	9	Lloyd McVeigh	6 ft 6 in (1.98 m)	205 lb (93 kg)	So	The Southport School	Cabarita Beach, Australia
G	10	Eric Kenesie Jr.	6 ft 0 in (1.83 m)	180 lb (82 kg)	Fr	St. Joseph Catholic Academy	Kenosha, Wisconsin
G	11	Bryson Wilson	6 ft 5 in (1.96 m)	210 lb (95 kg)	So	St. Stephen's & St. Agnes School	Washington, D.C.
F/C	14	Frederiks Meinarts	7 ft 0 in (2.13 m)	196 lb (89 kg)	Fr	IMG Academy	Riga, Latvia
G/F	15	Sam Akot	6 ft 7 in (2.01 m)	180 lb (82 kg)	Fr	Notre Dame Catholic Secondary School	London, Ontario
G	20	Daniel Shao	5 ft 10 in (1.78 m)	175 lb (79 kg)	So	Parsippany Hills High School	Morris Plains, New Jersey
G	22	Kavon Bradford	6 ft 2 in (1.88 m)	180 lb (82 kg)	Fr	Western Canada Prep Academy	Portland, Oregon
C	33	Tim Oboh	6 ft 11 in (2.11 m)	230 lb (104 kg)	Fr	The Canterbury Academy	Orpington, England

Head coach

- George Halcovage (Babson)

Assistant coach(es)

- Hamlet Tibbs (West Virginia)
- Jake Presutti (Syracuse)
- Tim Saunders (Villanova)
- Jack Fitzpatrick (Emmanuel)
- Kevin Voigt (Villanova)

Legend

- (C) Team captain
- (S) Suspended
- (I) Ineligible
- (W) Walk-on
- Injured
- Current redshirt

Roster
Last update: November 12, 2024

== Schedule and results ==
Date time, TV	Rank^{#}	Opponent^{#}	Result	Record	High points	High rebounds	High assists	Site (attendance) city, state
Exhibition
October 30, 2024*; 7:00 pm		Daemen	L 61–67	–	21 – Dunn	8 – Tied	2 – Dunn	Alumni Arena (1,071); Amherst, NY
Non-conference regular season
November 4, 2024*; 7:00 pm, ESPN+		at Old Dominion; MAC-SBC Challenge	W 83–82	1–0	24 – Dunn	6 – Tied	10 – Dunn	Chartway Arena (5,455); Norfolk, VA
November 8, 2024*; 8:00 pm, ESPN+		Fredonia	W 87–78	2–0	28 – Sabol	10 – Dunn	14 – Dunn	Alumni Arena (1,460); Amherst, NY
November 11, 2024*; 7:00 pm, ACCNX/ESPN+		at Notre Dame	L 77–86	2–1	18 – Sabol	13 – Wilson	9 – Dunn	Purcell Pavilion (4,132); South Bend, IN
November 14, 2024*; 7:00 pm, ESPN+		Bryant	L 64–87	2–2	17 – Sabol	6 – Batchelor	3 – Batchelor	Alumni Arena (1,159); Amherst, NY
November 19, 2024*; 7:00 pm, ESPN+		at Vermont	L 67–78	2–3	22 – Sabol	10 – Batchelor	3 – Wilson	Patrick Gym (2,227); Burlington, VT
November 22, 2024*; 7:00 pm, ESPN+		Morgan State	W 82–73	3–3	22 – Dunn	6 – Tied	8 – Dunn	Alumni Arena (1,557); Amherst, NY
November 25, 2024*; 7:00 pm, ESPN+		North Carolina A&T	W 82–81	4–3	22 – Sabol	9 – Dunn	6 – Dunn	Alumni Arena (1,181); Amherst, NY
December 1, 2024*; 2:00 pm, BTN		at Penn State	L 64–87	4–4	19 – Sabol	4 – Meinarts	3 – Sabol	Bryce Jordan Center (7,214); University Park, PA
December 3, 2024*; 7:00 pm, ESPN+		Pitt–Bradford	W 100–65	5–4	19 – Boldin Jr.	9 – Batchelor	4 – Tied	Alumni Arena (1,001); Amherst, NY
December 7, 2024*; 7:00 pm, ESPN+		at St. Bonaventure	L 55–65	5–5	14 – Tied	5 – Tied	4 – Dunn	Reilly Center (3,955); St. Bonaventure, NY
December 19, 2024*; 7:00 pm, SECN+/ESPN+		at Georgia	L 49–100	5–6	9 – Dunn	4 – Tied	3 – Dunn	Stegeman Coliseum (6,349); Athens, GA
December 29, 2024*; 3:00 pm, ESPNU		at Temple	L 71–91	5–7	11 – Tied	6 – Batchelor	4 – Dunn	Liacouras Center (3,198); Philadelphia, PA
MAC regular season
January 4, 2025; 1:00 pm, ESPN+		at Miami (OH)	L 79–93	5–8 (0–1)	25 – Sabol	7 – McVeigh	6 – Dunn	Millett Hall (1,047); Oxford, OH
January 7, 2025; 7:00 pm, ESPN+		Ohio	L 79–88	5–9 (0–2)	21 – Dunn	5 – Tied	8 – Dunn	Alumni Arena (968); Amherst, NY
January 10, 2025; 6:00 pm, CBSSN		Kent State	L 49–68	5–10 (0–3)	16 – Sabol	5 – Michaels	10 – Dunn	Alumni Arena (1,448); Amherst, NY
January 14, 2025; 7:00 pm, ESPN+		at Bowling Green	L 61–79	5–11 (0–4)	13 – Michaels	8 – Michaels	4 – Bradford	Stroh Center (1,639); Bowling Green, OH
January 18, 2025; 1:00 pm, ESPN+		at Western Michigan	W 85–76	6–11 (1–4)	20 – Dunn	12 – Batchelor	8 – Dunn	University Arena (1,672); Kalamazoo, MI
January 21, 2025; 7:00 pm, ESPN+		Akron	L 58–90	6–12 (1–5)	15 – Sabol	5 – Batchelor	5 – Dunn	Alumni Arena (1,021); Amherst, NY
January 25, 2025; 2:00 pm, ESPN+		at Eastern Michigan	L 77–90	6–13 (1–6)	25 – Sabol	9 – Batchelor	3 – Tied	George Gervin GameAbove Center (1,513); Ypsilanti, MI
January 28, 2025; 7:00 pm, ESPN+		Central Michigan	W 75–69	7–13 (2–6)	24 – Sabol	7 – Batchelor	9 – Dunn	Alumni Arena (1,211); Amherst, NY
February 1, 2025; 5:00 pm, ESPN+		Ball State	L 76–89	7–14 (2–7)	16 – Tied	7 – Batchelor	6 – Dunn	Alumni Arena (2,101); Amherst, NY
February 4, 2025; 7:00 pm, ESPN+		at Toledo	L 74–87	7–15 (2–8)	19 – Dunn	8 – Sabol	6 – Dunn	Savage Arena (4,052); Toledo, OH
February 8, 2025*; 2:00 pm, ESPN+		Georgia State; MAC-SBC Challenge	L 75–80	7–16	13 – Tied	10 – Michaels	5 – Dunn	Alumni Arena (1,395); Amherst, NY
February 11, 2025; 7:00 pm, ESPN+		at Northern Illinois	W 73–67	8–16 (3–8)	22 – Dunn	9 – Batchelor	4 – Dunn	Convocation Center (1,014); DeKalb, IL
February 15, 2025; 2:00 pm, ESPN+		Bowling Green	L 59–63	8–17 (3–9)	12 – Boldin Jr.	12 – Wilson	4 – Bradford	Alumni Arena (1,534); Amherst, NY
February 18, 2025; 7:00 pm, ESPN+		Western Michigan	L 64–97	8–18 (3–10)	14 – Jackson	5 – Oboh	4 – Bradford	Alumni Arena (1,599); Amherst, NY
February 22, 2025; 2:00 pm, ESPN+		at Ball State	L 66–80	8–19 (3–11)	18 – Bradford	10 – Batchelor	7 – Dunn	Worthen Arena (5,276); Muncie, IN
February 25, 2025; 7:00 pm, ESPN+		at Central Michigan	L 69–73	8–20 (3–12)	22 – Wilson	7 – Batchelor	5 – Dunn	McGuirk Arena (1,244); Mount Pleasant, MI
March 1, 2025; 4:30 pm, ESPN+		Toledo	W 87–74	9–20 (4–12)	26 – Dunn	6 – Wilson	5 – Sabol	Alumni Arena (2,597); Amherst, NY
March 4, 2025; 7:00 pm, ESPN+		Miami (OH)	L 69–84	9–21 (4–13)	16 – Dunn	10 – Batchelor	8 – Dunn	Alumni Arena (1,166); Amherst, NY
March 7, 2025; 7:00 pm, ESPN+		at Akron	L 70–88	9–22 (4–14)	14 – Tied	6 – McVeigh	2 – Wilson	James A. Rhodes Arena (2,391); Akron, OH
*Non-conference game. ^{#}Rankings from AP Poll. (#) Tournament seedings in parentheses. All times are in Eastern.
