= 2024–25 Western Michigan Broncos men's basketball team =

American college basketball season

2024–25 Western Michigan Broncos men's basketball
- Conference: Mid-American Conference
- Record: 12–20 (9–9 MAC)
- Head coach: Dwayne Stephens (3rd season)
- Associate head coach: Chris Fowler
- Assistant coaches: Jeff Rutter; Manny Dosanjh; Shayne Whittington; Sam Little
- Home arena: University Arena

2024–25 Mid-American Conference men's basketball standings
	Conf.				Overall
Team	W		L	PCT	W		L	PCT
Akron †	17	–	1	.944	28	–	7	.800
Miami (OH)	14	–	4	.778	25	–	9	.735
Kent State	11	–	7	.611	24	–	12	.667
Toledo	10	–	8	.556	18	–	15	.545
Ohio	10	–	8	.556	16	–	16	.500
Western Michigan	9	–	9	.500	12	–	20	.375
Eastern Michigan	9	–	9	.500	16	–	16	.500
Bowling Green	8	–	10	.444	14	–	18	.438
Ball State	7	–	11	.389	14	–	17	.452
Central Michigan	7	–	11	.389	14	–	17	.452
Buffalo	4	–	14	.222	9	–	22	.290
Northern Illinois	2	–	16	.111	6	–	25	.194
† 2025 MAC tournament winner

The 2024–25 Western Michigan Broncos men's basketball team represented Western Michigan University during the 2024–25 NCAA Division I men's basketball season. The Broncos, led by third-year head coach Dwayne Stephens, played their home games at University Arena in Kalamazoo, Michigan as members of the Mid-American Conference (MAC).

== Previous season ==
The Broncos finished the 2023–24 season 12–20, 9–9 in MAC play, to finish in a tie for sixth place. They were defeated by Ohio in the first round of the MAC tournament.

== Offseason ==
=== Departures ===
Departures
Name	Number	Pos.	Height	Weight	Year	Hometown	Reason for departure
Anthony Crump	0	F	6' 8"	215	Graduate student	Inkster, MI	Graduated
Jefferson De La Cruz Monegro	2	G	6' 4"	185	Sophomore	LaSalle, QC	Transferred to Valparaiso
B. Artis White	3	G	5' 10"	155	RS Junior	Canton, MI	Transferred to Richmond
Seth Hubbard	12	G	6' 4"	175	Sophomore	Jonesboro, GA	Transferred to Toledo
Titus Wright	22	C	6' 8"	220	Senior	Thomasville, GA	Graduated
Javonte Brown	31	C	7' 0"	255	RS Sophomore	Toronto, ON	Transferred to Rhode Island
Alika Edmonds	52	G	6' 1"	185	Senior	Kalamazoo, MI	Graduated

=== Incoming transfers ===
Incoming transfers
Name	Number	Pos.	Height	Weight	Year	Hometown	Previous school
Donovan Williams	0	G	6' 5"	220	Graduate student	Rockford, IL	Pacific
Marquese Josephs	1	G	6' 1"	200	Sophomore	Toronto, ON	Grand Canyon
Chansey Willis Jr.	2	G	6' 2"	190	Junior	Detroit, MI	Henry Ford College
Hutch Ward	12	F	6' 7"	210	Sophomore	Kalamazoo, MI	Wayne State
Seryee Lewis	15	F	6' 9"	240	RS Sophomore	Chicago, IL	Keiser

=== Recruiting class ===
College recruiting information
Name	Hometown	School	Height	Weight	Commit date
Nicholas Errica; G	Cremona, Italy	Luiss Roma	6 ft 3 in (1.91 m)	185 lb (84 kg)	
Nicholas Errica; G	Recruit ratings: Rivals: 247Sports: ESPN: (N/A)				
EJ Ryans; G	Grand Rapids, MI	Northview High School	6 ft 3 in (1.91 m)	185 lb (84 kg)	
EJ Ryans; G	Recruit ratings: Rivals: 247Sports: ESPN: (N/A)				
Junior Sileu; F	Douala, Cameroon	AZ Compass Prep	6 ft 10 in (2.08 m)	220 lb (100 kg)	
Junior Sileu; F	Recruit ratings: Rivals: 247Sports: ESPN: (N/A)				
Overall recruit ranking:
Note: In many cases, Scout, Rivals, 247Sports, On3, and ESPN may conflict in their listings of height and weight.; In these cases, the average was taken. ESPN grades are on a 100-point scale.; Sources: "2024 Team Ranking". Rivals.

== Preseason ==
On October 22, 2024 the MAC released the preseason coaches poll. Western Michigan was picked to finish tenth in the MAC regular season.

=== Preseason rankings ===
MAC preseason poll
Predicted finish	Team	Votes (1st place)
1	Ohio	121 (11)
2	Akron	106 (1)
3	Kent State	99
4	Toledo	95
5	Bowling Green	73
6	Miami (OH)	72
7	Ball State	67
8	Central Michigan	55
9	Eastern Michigan	36
10	Western Michigan	33
11	Northern Illinois	24
12	Buffalo	11

MAC tournament champions: Ohio (8), Kent State (3), Toledo (1)

=== Preseason All-MAC ===
No Broncos were named to the first or second Preseason All-MAC teams.

== Roster ==
2024–25 Western Michigan Broncos men's basketball team
Players
Coaches

Pos.	#	Name	Height	Weight	Year	Previous school	Hometown
G	0	Donovan Williams	6 ft 5 in (1.96 m)	220 lb (100 kg)	GS	Pacific	Rockford, IL
G	1	Marquese Josephs	6 ft 1 in (1.85 m)	200 lb (91 kg)	So	Grand Canyon	Toronto, ON
G	2	Chansey Jr. Willis	6 ft 2 in (1.88 m)	190 lb (86 kg)	Jr	Henry Ford College	Detroit, MI
G	3	EJ Ryans	6 ft 3 in (1.91 m)	185 lb (84 kg)	Fr	Northview High School	Grand Rapids, MI
G	4	JaVaughn Hannah	6 ft 4 in (1.93 m)	205 lb (93 kg)	Jr	Orchard Lake St. Mary's	Mount Clemens, MI
G	7	Brandon Muntu	6 ft 4 in (1.93 m)	190 lb (86 kg)	RS Jr	Triton College	Calgary, AB
F	10	Max Burton	6 ft 10 in (2.08 m)	240 lb (109 kg)	RS So	Williamston High School	Williamston, MI
F	12	Hutch Ward	6 ft 7 in (2.01 m)	210 lb (95 kg)	So	Wayne State	Kalamazoo, MI
F	15	Seryee Lewis	6 ft 9 in (2.06 m)	240 lb (109 kg)	RS So	Keiser	Chicago, IL
F	20	Owen Lobsinger	6 ft 9 in (2.06 m)	225 lb (102 kg)	Sr	Flint Powers Catholic High School	Flint, MI
G	21	Nicholas Errica	6 ft 3 in (1.91 m)	185 lb (84 kg)	Fr	Luiss Roma	Cremona, Italy
G/F	22	Markhi Strickland	6 ft 6 in (1.98 m)	210 lb (95 kg)	RS Jr	Victoria College	Miami, FL
G/F	23	Josh Thomas	6 ft 6 in (1.98 m)	185 lb (84 kg)	RS Fr	Evanston Township High School	Lincolnshire, IL
F	24	Michael Sulaka	6 ft 9 in (2.06 m)	215 lb (98 kg)	RS Fr	De La Salle High School	Macomb, MI
F	33	Jack Stefanski	6 ft 6 in (1.98 m)	205 lb (93 kg)	RS Jr	Frankfort High School	Frankfort, MI
F	52	Junior Sileu	6 ft 10 in (2.08 m)	220 lb (100 kg)	Fr	AZ Compass Prep	Douala, Cameroon

Head coach

- Dwayne Stephens (Michigan State)

Assistant coach(es)

- Chris Fowler (Central Michigan)
- Jeff Rutter (Winona State)
- Manny Dosanjh (Oral Roberts)
- Shayne Whittington (Western Michigan)
- Sam Little (Texas)

Legend

- (C) Team captain
- (S) Suspended
- (I) Ineligible
- (W) Walk-on
- Injured
- Current redshirt

Roster
Last update: January 18, 2025

== Schedule and results ==
Date time, TV	Rank^{#}	Opponent^{#}	Result	Record	High points	High rebounds	High assists	Site (attendance) city, state
Exhibition
October 30, 2024*; 7:00 p.m.		Kalamazoo	W 92–63	–	– -	– -	– -	University Arena; Kalamazoo, MI
Non-conference regular season
November 4, 2024*; 7:00 p.m., ESPN+		at Coastal Carolina; MAC–SBC Challenge	L 56–60	0–1	13 – tied	11 – Lobsinger	2 – tied	HTC Center (2,192); Conway, SC
November 7, 2024*; 7:00 p.m.		Davenport	W 86–46	1–1	17 – Muntu	10 – Lewis	7 – Ryans	University Arena (1,370); Kalamazoo, MI
November 11, 2024*; 7:00 p.m., FS1		at Butler	L 65–85	1–2	17 – Williams	9 – Williams	2 – tied	Hinkle Fieldhouse (6,855); Indianapolis, IN
November 15, 2024*; 5:00 p.m., ESPN+		SIU Edwardsville; Bronco Classic	L 60–79	1–3	16 – Lobsinger	7 – Williams	1 – tied	University Arena (1,258); Kalamazoo, MI
November 17, 2024*; 12:00 p.m., ESPN+		Canisius; Bronco Classic	W 92–69	2–3	15 – Strickland	9 – Lobsinger	7 – Josephs	University Arena (1,406); Kalamazoo, MI
November 20, 2024*; 7:00 p.m., ESPN+		South Dakota	L 76–80	2–4	20 – Strickland	11 – Burton	3 – Lobsinger	University Arena (1,203); Kalamazoo, MI
November 27, 2024*; 2:00 p.m., ESPN+		at Youngstown State	W 73–62	3–4	18 – tied	12 – Burton	2 – tied	Beeghly Center (1,543); Youngstown, OH
December 3, 2024*; 7:00 p.m., ESPN+		at Dayton	L 69–77	3–5	24 – Lobsinger	6 – Burton	5 – Ryans	UD Arena (13,407); Dayton, OH
December 13, 2024*; 9:00 p.m., SLN		at St. Thomas	L 71–77	3–6	17 – Hannah	8 – tied	5 – Willis Jr.	Schoenecker Arena (1,092); St. Paul, MN
December 15, 2024*; 2:00 p.m., SLN		at North Dakota State	L 62–98	3–7	22 – Willis Jr.	7 – Lobsinger	5 – Willis Jr.	Scheels Center (1,009); Fargo, ND
December 20, 2024*; 1:00 p.m., ESPN+		Valparaiso	L 73–76	3–8	16 – Willis Jr.	7 – tied	7 – Willis Jr.	University Arena (1,234); Kalamazoo, MI
December 30, 2024*; 3:00 p.m., BTN		at No. 18 Michigan State	L 62–80	3–9	12 – Willis Jr.	7 – Willis Jr.	6 – Willis Jr.	Breslin Center (14,797); East Lansing, MI
MAC regular season
January 4, 2025; 12:00 p.m., ESPN+		Toledo	L 70–76	3–10 (0–1)	21 – Willis Jr.	13 – Lobsinger	7 – Willis Jr.	University Arena (1,819); Kalamazoo, MI
January 7, 2025; 7:00 p.m., ESPN+		Bowling Green	L 79–83	3–11 (0–2)	12 – Lobsinger	8 – Lobsinger	4 – Willis Jr.	University Arena (1,383); Kalamazoo, MI
January 11, 2025; 3:30 p.m., ESPN+		at Miami (OH)	L 71–91	3–12 (0–3)	14 – Strickland	8 – Burton	4 – Willis Jr.	Millett Hall (1,002); Oxford, OH
January 14, 2025; 7:00 p.m., ESPN+		at Kent State	W 94–83	4–12 (1–3)	18 – Strickland	7 – tied	7 – Willis Jr.	MAC Center (1,488); Kent, OH
January 18, 2025; 1:00 p.m., ESPN+		Buffalo	L 76–85	4–13 (1–4)	21 – Willis Jr.	14 – Lobsinger	5 – Willis Jr.	University Arena (1,672); Kalamazoo, MI
January 21, 2025; 7:00 p.m., ESPN+		at Northern Illinois	W 72–70	5–13 (2–4)	18 – Willis Jr.	9 – Burton	7 – Willis Jr.	Convocation Center (1,232); DeKalb, IL
January 25, 2025; 7:00 p.m., ESPN+		at Central Michigan	L 52–73	5–14 (2–5)	14 – Strickland	9 – Lobsinger	5 – Willis Jr.	McGuirk Arena (5,361); Mount Pleasant, MI
January 28, 2025; 7:00 p.m., ESPN+		at Ball State	W 74–71	6–14 (3–5)	17 – tied	7 – Williams	7 – Willis Jr.	Worthen Arena (3,026); Muncie, IN
February 1, 2025; 1:00 p.m., ESPN+		Eastern Michigan	W 61–54	7–14 (4–5)	16 – Willis Jr.	10 – Williams	3 – Strickland	University Arena (1,577); Kalamazoo, MI
February 4, 2025; 7:00 p.m., ESPN+		at Ohio	L 69–94	7–15 (4–6)	20 – Willis Jr.	5 – tied	5 – Willis Jr.	Convocation Center (4,058); Athens, OH
February 8, 2025*; 1:00 p.m., ESPN+		Georgia Southern; MAC–SBC Challenge	L 57–83	7–16	13 – tied	6 – Burton	6 – Willis Jr.	University Arena (1,431); Kalamazoo, MI
February 11, 2025; 7:00 p.m., ESPN+		at Akron	L 92–105	7–17 (4–7)	28 – Willis Jr.	7 – tied	4 – Willis Jr.	James A. Rhodes Arena (1,380); Akron, OH
February 15, 2025; 2:30 p.m., ESPN+		Miami (OH)	W 78–70	8–17 (5–7)	22 – Willis Jr.	15 – Williams	7 – Willis Jr.	University Arena (1,639); Kalamazoo, MI
February 18, 2025; 7:00 p.m., ESPN+		at Buffalo	W 97–64	9–17 (6–7)	20 – Strickland	8 – Williams	8 – Willis Jr.	Alumni Arena (1,599); Amherst, NY
February 22, 2025; 1:00 p.m., ESPN+		Central Michigan	L 57–86	9–18 (6–8)	19 – Hannah	5 – Hannah	4 – Willis Jr.	University Arena (2,506); Kalamazoo, MI
February 25, 2025; 7:00 p.m., ESPN+		Ohio	W 82–73	10–18 (7–8)	34 – Willis Jr.	12 – Williams	8 – Willis Jr.	University Arena (1,849); Kalamazoo, MI
March 1, 2025; 3:30 p.m., ESPN+		at Northern Illinois	W 74–70	11–18 (8–8)	17 – Willis Jr.	11 – Williams	7 – Willis Jr.	Convocation Center (2,484); DeKalb, IL
March 4, 2025; 7:00 p.m., ESPN+		Kent State	L 76–77	11–19 (8–9)	24 – Willis Jr.	10 – Strickland	8 – Willis Jr.	University Arena (1,503); Kalamazoo, MI
March 7, 2025; 7:00 p.m., ESPN+		at Bowling Green	W 64–63	12–19 (9–9)	18 – Hannah	7 – Lobsinger	5 – Willis Jr.	Stroh Center (2,992); Bowling Green, OH
MAC tournament
March 13, 2025; 6:30 pm, ESPN+	(6)	vs. (3) Kent State; Quarterfinals	L 66–73	12–20	16 – Lobsinger	6 – tied	7 – Willis Jr.	Rocket Arena; Cleveland, OH
*Non-conference game. ^{#}Rankings from AP poll. (#) Tournament seedings in parentheses. All times are in Eastern.
