= 2025 MAC men's basketball tournament =

Basketball tournament

2025 Mid-American Conference men's basketball tournament
- Classification: Division I
- Season: 2024–25
- Teams: 8
- Site: Rocket Arena; Cleveland, Ohio
- Champions: Akron (6th title)
- Winning coach: John Groce (5th title)
- MVP: Nate Johnson (Akron)
- Attendance: 31,312 (Total); 7,099 (Final)
- Television: ESPN2, CBSSN, ESPN+

2024–25 Mid-American Conference men's basketball standings
	Conf.				Overall
Team	W		L	PCT	W		L	PCT
Akron †	17	–	1	.944	28	–	7	.800
Miami (OH)	14	–	4	.778	25	–	9	.735
Kent State	11	–	7	.611	24	–	12	.667
Toledo	10	–	8	.556	18	–	15	.545
Ohio	10	–	8	.556	16	–	16	.500
Western Michigan	9	–	9	.500	12	–	20	.375
Eastern Michigan	9	–	9	.500	16	–	16	.500
Bowling Green	8	–	10	.444	14	–	18	.438
Ball State	7	–	11	.389	14	–	17	.452
Central Michigan	7	–	11	.389	14	–	17	.452
Buffalo	4	–	14	.222	9	–	22	.290
Northern Illinois	2	–	16	.111	6	–	25	.194
† 2025 MAC tournament winner

The 2025 Mid-American Conference men's basketball tournament was the postseason men's basketball tournament for the Mid-American Conference (MAC) held March 13–15, 2025. The entire tournament was played at Rocket Arena in Cleveland, Ohio. Akron defeated Bowling Green and Toledo in the first two rounds and then Miami in the final Nate Johnson of Akron was the MVP.

== Format ==
As with all MAC tournaments since 2021, only the top eight teams qualified. The winner of the tournament, Akron, received the MAC's automatic bid to the 2025 NCAA tournament.

== Venue ==
The 2025 MAC tournament was held at Rocket Arena for the 26th consecutive season. The venue, located in downtown Cleveland at One Center Court, is the home of the Cleveland Cavaliers of the National Basketball Association (NBA) and has a seating capacity for basketball of 19,432.

== Seeds ==
Eight out of the twelve MAC teams qualified for the tournament. Teams were seeded by record within the conference, with a tiebreaker system to seed teams with identical conference records.

Seed	School	Conference record	Tiebreaker
1	Akron †	17–1	
2	Miami (Ohio)	14–4	
3	Kent State	11–7	
4	Toledo	10–8	2–0 vs. Ohio
5	Ohio	10–8	0–2 vs. Toledo
6	Western Michigan	9–9	1–0 vs. Eastern Michigan
7	Eastern Michigan	9–9	0–1 vs. Western Michigan
8	Bowling Green	8–10	
DNQ	Ball State	7–11	1–0 vs. Kent State
DNQ	Central Michigan	7–11	0–1 vs. Kent State
DNQ	Buffalo	4–14	
DNQ	Northern Illinois	2–16	

== Schedule ==
Session	Game	Time *	Matchup	Score	Attendance	Television
Quarterfinals – Thursday, March 13
1	1	11:00 a.m.	No. 1 Akron vs. No. 8 Bowling Green	96–67	8,737	ESPN+
1	2	1:30 p.m.	No. 4 Toledo vs. No. 5 Ohio	90–85 ^{OT}	8,737	ESPN+
1	3	4:30 p.m.	No. 2 Miami (Ohio) vs. No. 7 Eastern Michigan	81–75	8,737	ESPN+
1	4	6:30 p.m.	No. 3 Kent State vs. No. 6 Western Michigan	73–66	8,737	ESPN+
Semifinals – Friday, March 14
2	5	5:00 p.m.	No. 1 Akron vs. No. 4 Toledo	100–90	15,476	CBSSN
2	6	7:30 p.m.	No. 2 Miami (Ohio) vs. No. 3 Kent State	72–64	15,476	CBSSN
Final – Saturday, March 15
3	7	7:30 p.m.	No. 1 Akron vs. No. 2 Miami (Ohio)	76–74	7,099	ESPN2
* Game times are in EDT. ()-Rankings denote tournament seeding.

== Bracket ==
Quarterfinals; Thursday, March 13; ESPN+
1	Akron	96
8	Bowling Green	67
4	Toledo	90
5	Ohio	85 ^{OT}
2	Miami (Ohio)	81
7	Eastern Michigan	75
3	Kent State	73
6	Western Michigan	66

Semifinals; Friday, March 14; CBSSN
1	Akron	100
4	Toledo	90
2	Miami (Ohio)	72
3	Kent State	64

Final; Saturday, March 15; ESPN2
1	Akron	76
2	Miami (Ohio)	74

== All-Tournament team ==
Player	Team
Kam Craft	Miami (Ohio)
Nate Johnson	Akron
Tavari Johnson	Akron
Peter Suder	Miami (Ohio)
Jalen Sullinger	Kent State

Tournament MVP – Nate Johnson

== See also ==
- 2025 MAC women's basketball tournament
