= Rashon Burno =

American basketball player and coach (born 1978)

Biographical details
- Born: February 3, 1978 (age 48); Jersey City, New Jersey, U.S.

Playing career
- 1998–2002: DePaul

Coaching career (HC unless noted)
- 2007–2010: Marmion Academy
- 2010–2011: Towson (assistant)
- 2011–2012: Manhattan (assistant)
- 2012–2015: Florida (assistant)
- 2015–2021: Arizona State (assistant)
- 2021–2026: Northern Illinois

Head coaching record
- Overall: 48–106 (.312) (college); 42–38 (.525) (high school)

Rashon Burno (born February 3, 1978) is an American basketball coach who was most recently the head coach of the Northern Illinois Huskies men's basketball team.

== Playing career ==
Burno played at St. Anthony High School in New Jersey under Bob Hurley, where he was a part of two national championship teams his junior and senior years. He played collegiately at DePaul under Pat Kennedy and was part of the Blue Demons' 2000 NCAA tournament squad.

After graduating from DePaul, Burno worked in the financial services industry, including a position at Morgan Stanley as a wealth advisor before returning to basketball and beginning his coaching career.

== Coaching career ==
Burno got his coaching start as the head basketball coach at Marmion Academy from 2007 to 2010, where he also served as an economics and physical education teacher before landing his first college coaching job as an assistant at Towson, reuniting with his college head coach Kennedy. He was then an assistant coach at Manhattan, then for four years under Billy Donovan at Florida from 2012 to 2015, where he was part of three Elite Eight teams and the 2014 NCAA Final Four team. In 2015, he joined Bobby Hurley's staff at Arizona State.

On March 6, 2021, Burno was named the 29th head coach in Northern Illinois history, replacing Mark Montgomery.

On March 7, 2026, Burno was fired by Northern Illinois. He finished his five year tenure with the Huskies with a 39-85 record, failing to achieve a winning record.

== Head coaching record ==
Record table
Season	Team	Overall	Conference	Standing	Postseason
Northern Illinois Huskies (MAC) (2021–2026)
2021–22	Northern Illinois	9–21	6–14	T–9th	
2022–23	Northern Illinois	13–19	9–9	T–6th	
2023–24	Northern Illinois	11–20	5–13	11th	
2024–25	Northern Illinois	6–25	2–11	12th	
2025–26	Northern Illinois	9–21	4–14	12th	
Northern Illinois:		48–106 (.312)	26–61 (.299)		
Total:		48–106 (.312)			
National champion Postseason invitational champion Conference regular season champion Conference regular season and conference tournament champion Division regular season champion Division regular season and conference tournament champion Conference tournament champion
