= Nate Johnson (basketball, born 2003) =

American basketball player

No. 5 – Oklahoma City Blue
- Position: Shooting guard
- League: NBA G League

Personal information
- Born: June 16, 2003 (age 23) Dayton, Ohio, U.S.
- Listed height: 6 ft 3 in (1.91 m)
- Listed weight: 215 lb (98 kg)

Career information
- High school: Lakota East (Liberty Township, Ohio)
- College: Akron (2021–2025); Kansas State (2025–2026)
- NBA draft: 2026: undrafted
- Playing career: 2026–present

Career history
- 2026–present: Oklahoma City Blue

Career highlights
- MAC Player of the Year (2025); First-team All-MAC (2025); MAC Defensive Player of the Year (2025); MAC All-Defensive team (2025)
- Stats at NBA.com
- Stats at Basketball Reference

Nathaneal Darnell Johnson III (born June 16, 2003) is an American basketball player for the Oklahoma City Blue of the NBA G League. He played college basketball for the Akron Zips and Kansas State Wildcats.

== Career ==
Born in Dayton, Ohio, Johnson attended Lakota East High School in Liberty Township, a suburb of Cincinnati. As a junior, he averaged 16.0 points and 3.7 assists per game. Following his high school career, he committed to play college basketball at the University of Akron.

As a redshirt junior with Akron, Johnson was named the MAC Player of the Year and MAC Defensive Player of the Year. Against Toledo in the semifinals of the 2025 MAC men's basketball tournament, he recorded a career-high 31 points along with six assists, five rebounds, and two blocks in a 100–90 victory. Johnson averaged 14.0 points, 4.9 rebounds and 3.4 assists per game.

On April 20, 2025, Johnson announced his decision to transfer to Kansas State University to play for the Kansas State Wildcats. He averaged 12.8 points, 4.9 rebounds, 4.6 assists and 2.2 steals per game.
