= 2024–25 Toledo Rockets men's basketball team =

American college basketball season

2024–25 Toledo Rockets men's basketball
- Conference: Mid-American Conference
- Record: 18–15 (10–8 MAC)
- Head coach: Tod Kowalczyk (15th season)
- Associate head coach: Jeff Massey (11th season); Justin Ingram (7th season)
- Assistant coaches: Jordan Lauf (3rd season); Brandon Pritzl (1st season)
- Home arena: Savage Arena

2024–25 Mid-American Conference men's basketball standings
	Conf.				Overall
Team	W		L	PCT	W		L	PCT
Akron †	17	–	1	.944	28	–	7	.800
Miami (OH)	14	–	4	.778	25	–	9	.735
Kent State	11	–	7	.611	24	–	12	.667
Toledo	10	–	8	.556	18	–	15	.545
Ohio	10	–	8	.556	16	–	16	.500
Western Michigan	9	–	9	.500	12	–	20	.375
Eastern Michigan	9	–	9	.500	16	–	16	.500
Bowling Green	8	–	10	.444	14	–	18	.438
Ball State	7	–	11	.389	14	–	17	.452
Central Michigan	7	–	11	.389	14	–	17	.452
Buffalo	4	–	14	.222	9	–	22	.290
Northern Illinois	2	–	16	.111	6	–	25	.194
† 2025 MAC tournament winner

The 2024–25 Toledo Rockets men's basketball team represented the University of Toledo during the 2024–25 NCAA Division I men's basketball season. The Rockets, led by 15th-year head coach Tod Kowalczyk, played their home games at Savage Arena in Toledo, Ohio, as members of the Mid-American Conference.

== Previous season ==
The Rockets finished the 2023–24 season 20–12, 14–4 in MAC play, to win their fourth straight regular-season MAC championship. They were upset by Kent State in the quarterfinals of the MAC tournament. Toledo was not selected for the NIT and declined invitations to participate in the CBI and the CIT, ending their season.

== Offseason ==
=== Departures ===
Departures
Name	Number	Pos.	Height	Weight	Year	Hometown	Reason for departure
Ra'Heim Moss	0	G	6'4"	205	Junior	Springfield, Ohio	Transferred to Oregon
Dante Maddox Jr.	21	G	6'2"	185	RS junior	Chicago Heights, Illinois	Transferred to Xavier
Tyler Cochran	23	G	6'2"	225	Junior	Bolingbrook, Illinois	Transferred to Minnesota
Marko Maletic	27	G	6'6"	208	Junior	London, Ontario	Transferred to Western Illinois
Ben Wight	35	F	6'9"	220	Junior	Columbus, Ohio	Transferred to Stony Brook

=== Incoming transfers ===
Incoming transfers
Name	Number	Pos.	Height	Weight	Year	Hometown	Previous school
Isaiah Adams	7	G	6'7"	225	Fifth year	Jacksonville, Florida	Buffalo
Seth Hubbard	12	G	6'4"	195	Junior	Jonesboro, Georgia	Western Michigan
Colin O'Rourke	20	F	6'8"	225	Graduate student	Plainfield, Illinois	Wisconsin–Parkside

=== Recruiting class ===
College recruiting
Name	Hometown	School	Height	Weight	Commit date
Jaylen Murphy; G	Holland, Ohio	St. John's Jesuit High School	6 ft 3 in (1.91 m)	170 lb (77 kg)	
Jaylen Murphy; G	Recruit ratings: Rivals: 247Sports: ESPN: (N/A)				
Ka'leel Stillman; C	Orlando, Florida	Montverde Academy	6 ft 10 in (2.08 m)	220 lb (100 kg)	
Ka'leel Stillman; C	Recruit ratings: Rivals: 247Sports: ESPN: (N/A)				
Tyler Ode; G	Saginaw, Michigan	Saginaw Heritage High School	6 ft 5 in (1.96 m)	195 lb (88 kg)	
Tyler Ode; G	Recruit ratings: Rivals: 247Sports: ESPN: (N/A)				
Jaylan Ouwinga; F	Grand Rapids, Michigan	Grand Rapids Christian High School	6 ft 9 in (2.06 m)	210 lb (95 kg)	
Jaylan Ouwinga; F	Recruit ratings: Rivals: 247Sports: ESPN: (N/A)				
Overall recruit ranking:
Note: In many cases, Scout, Rivals, 247Sports, On3, and ESPN may conflict in their listings of height and weight.; In these cases, the average was taken. ESPN grades are on a 100-point scale.; Sources: "2024 Team Ranking". Rivals.

== Preseason ==
On October 22, 2024, the MAC released the preseason coaches poll. Toledo was picked to finish fourth in the MAC regular season.

=== Preseason rankings ===
MAC preseason poll
Predicted finish	Team	Votes (1st place)
1	Ohio	121 (11)
2	Akron	106 (1)
3	Kent State	99
4	Toledo	95
5	Bowling Green	73
6	Miami (OH)	72
7	Ball State	67
8	Central Michigan	55
9	Eastern Michigan	36
10	Western Michigan	33
11	Northern Illinois	24
12	Buffalo	11

MAC Tournament Champions: Ohio (8), Kent State (3), Toledo (1)

=== Preseason All-MAC ===
Preseason All-MAC teams
Team	Player	Position	Year
First	Javan Simmons	Forward	Sophomore
Second	Isaiah Adams	Guard	Fifth year

== Roster ==
2024–25 Toledo Rockets men's basketball team
Players
Coaches

Pos.	#	Name	Height	Weight	Year	Previous school	Hometown
F	1	Javan Simmons	6 ft 7 in (2.01 m)	235 lb (107 kg)	So	Gahanna-Lincoln High School	Gahanna, Ohio
G	2	Bryce Ford	6 ft 3 in (1.91 m)	190 lb (86 kg)	So	Pinnacle High School	Scottsdale, Arizona
G	3	Sonny Wilson	6 ft 1 in (1.85 m)	175 lb (79 kg)	So	Detroit Jesuit High School	Pontiac, Michigan
F	4	Xavier Thomas	6 ft 5 in (1.96 m)	240 lb (109 kg)	So	Brother Rice High School	Detroit, Michigan
G	6	Jaylen Murphy	6 ft 3 in (1.91 m)	170 lb (77 kg)	Fr	St. John's Jesuit High School	Holland, Ohio
G	7	Isaiah Adams (5Y)	6 ft 7 in (2.01 m)	225 lb (102 kg)	Sr	Buffalo	Jacksonville, Florida
C	10	Ka'leel Stillman	6 ft 10 in (2.08 m)	220 lb (100 kg)	Fr	Montverde Academy	Orlando, Florida
G	11	Sam Lewis	6 ft 6 in (1.98 m)	210 lb (95 kg)	So	Simeon Career Academy	Chicago, Illinois
G	12	Seth Hubbard	6 ft 4 in (1.93 m)	195 lb (88 kg)	Jr	Western Michigan	Jonesboro, Georgia
F	13	André Lorentsson	6 ft 9 in (2.06 m)	225 lb (102 kg)	Sr	Saint Louis	Gothenburg, Sweden
F	20	Colin O'Rourke	6 ft 8 in (2.03 m)	225 lb (102 kg)	GS	Wisconsin–Parkside	Plainfield, Illinois
G	22	Tyler Ode	6 ft 5 in (1.96 m)	195 lb (88 kg)	Fr	Saginaw Heritage High School	Saginaw, Michigan
F	24	Grgur Brcic	6 ft 10 in (2.08 m)	225 lb (102 kg)	So	Williston Northampton School	Zagreb, Croatia
F	32	Jaylan Ouwinga	6 ft 9 in (2.06 m)	210 lb (95 kg)	Fr	Grand Rapids Christian High School	Grand Rapids, Michigan

Head coach

- Tod Kowalczyk (Minnesota Duluth)

Assistant coach(es)

- Jeff Massey (Xavier)
- Justin Ingram (Toledo)
- Jordan Lauf (Toledo)
- Brandon Pritzl (Hillsdale)

Legend

- (C) Team captain
- (S) Suspended
- (I) Ineligible
- (W) Walk-on
- (5Y) Fifth-year senior
- Injured
- Current redshirt

Roster
Last update: November 14, 2024

== Schedule and results ==
Date time, TV	Rank^{#}	Opponent^{#}	Result	Record	High points	High rebounds	High assists	Site (attendance) city, state
Exhibition
October 19, 2024*; 2:00 pm		Grand Valley State	W 76–71	–	15 – Wilson	6 – Tied	– -	Savage Arena; Toledo, OH
October 25, 2024*; 7:30 pm, BTN		at Michigan	L 92–96	–	21 – Simmons	5 – Simmons	4 – Wilson	Crisler Center (9,915); Ann Arbor, MI
Non-conference regular season
November 4, 2024*; 7:00 pm, ESPN+		at Troy; MAC-SBC Challenge	L 74–84	0–1	19 – Simmons	8 – Simmons	5 – Wilson	Trojan Arena (3,369); Troy, Alabama
November 9, 2024*; 2:00 pm, ESPN+		at Marshall	W 90–80	1–1	17 – Tied	7 – Adams	3 – Simmons	Cam Henderson Center (3,759); Huntington, WV
November 13, 2024*; 7:00 pm, ESPN+		Wright State	W 86–77	2–1	20 – Wilson	8 – Wilson	6 – Simmons	Savage Arena (4,037); Toledo, OH
November 16, 2024*; 4:00 pm, ESPN+		at Detroit Mercy	W 82–67	3–1	22 – Wilson	8 – Lewis	6 – Wilson	Calihan Hall (1,098); Detroit, MI
November 21, 2024*; 5:30 pm, BallerTV		vs. Stetson; Boardwalk Battle quarterfinals	W 103–78	4–1	21 – Wilson	5 – Simmons	6 – Wilson	Ocean Center (752); Daytona Beach, FL
November 22, 2024*; 5:30 pm, BallerTV		vs. Jacksonville State; Boardwalk Battle semifinals	W 82–80	5–1	16 – Lewis	5 – Wilson	6 – Adams	Ocean Center (920); Daytona Beach, FL
November 23, 2024*; 5:30 pm, BallerTV		vs. UC San Diego; Boardwalk Battle championship	L 45–80	5–2	10 – Tied	5 – Tied	2 – Wilson	Ocean Center (0); Daytona Beach, FL
November 30, 2024*; 7:00 pm, ESPN+		Oakland	L 52–85	5–3	13 – Wilson	8 – Simmons	4 – Tied	Savage Arena (4,008); Toledo, OH
December 7, 2024*; 7:00 pm, ESPN+		Defiance	W 111–49	6–3	18 – Lewis	9 – Brcic	9 – Adams	Savage Arena (3,845); Toledo, OH
December 14, 2024*; 1:00 pm, ESPN+		at Youngstown State	L 87–93	6–4	21 – Lewis	8 – Lewis	4 – Wilson	Beeghly Center (2,416); Youngstown, OH
December 18, 2024*; 8:00 pm, ESPN+		at No. 15 Houston	L 49–78	6–5	14 – Lewis	6 – Brcic	3 – Adams	Fertitta Center (7,035); Houston, TX
December 29, 2024*; 6:00 pm, BTN		at No. 21 Purdue	L 64–83	6–6	13 – Tied	11 – Lewis	3 – Adams	Mackey Arena (14,876); West Lafayette, IN
MAC regular season
January 4, 2025; 12:00 pm, ESPN+		at Western Michigan	W 76–70	7–6 (1–0)	20 – Wilson	10 – Lewis	5 – Wilson	University Arena (1,819); Kalamazoo, MI
January 7, 2025; 7:00 pm, ESPN+		Eastern Michigan	W 90–87	8–6 (2–0)	20 – Lewis	8 – Simmons	6 – Adams	Savage Arena (4,246); Toledo, OH
January 10, 2025; 8:00 pm, CBSSN		Central Michigan	W 69–67	9–6 (3–0)	17 – Simmons	8 – Simmons	5 – Tied	Savage Arena (3,974); Toledo, OH
January 14, 2025; 7:00 pm, ESPN+		at Akron	L 78–85	9–7 (3–1)	17 – Adams	10 – Wilson	5 – Wilson	James A. Rhodes Arena (2,011); Akron, OH
January 18, 2025; 2:00 pm, ESPN+		at Ball State	W 93–75	10–7 (4–1)	21 – Lewis	12 – Simmons	3 – Wilson	Worthen Arena (4,412); Muncie, IN
January 21, 2025; 7:00 pm, ESPN+		Kent State	L 64–83	10–8 (4–2)	19 – Tied	7 – Simmons	5 – Adams	Savage Arena (3,983); Toledo, OH
January 24, 2025; 6:00 pm, CBSSN		at Bowling Green	W 84–71	11–8 (5–2)	18 – Tied	9 – Simmons	5 – Wilson	Stroh Center (4,072); Bowling Green, OH
January 28, 2025; 7:00 pm, ESPN2		at Ohio	W 86–83	12–8 (6–2)	15 – Tied	9 – Hubbard	4 – Tied	Convocation Center (4,442); Athens, OH
February 1, 2025; 2:00 pm, ESPN+		Northern Illinois	W 89–85	13–8 (7–2)	23 – Lewis	12 – Simmons	7 – Adams	Savage Arena (5,057); Toledo, OH
February 4, 2025; 7:00 pm, ESPN+		Buffalo	W 87–74	14–8 (8–2)	19 – Lewis	10 – Simmons	6 – Simmons	Savage Arena (4,052); Toledo, OH
February 8, 2025*; 2:00 pm, ESPN+		James Madison; MAC-Sun Belt Challenge	W 72–69	15–8	22 – Lewis	8 – Simmons	3 – Wilson	Savage Arena (4,438); Toledo, OH
February 11, 2025; 7:00 pm, ESPN+		at Miami (OH)	L 80–92	15–9 (8–3)	23 – Wilson	7 – Simmons	5 – Wilson	Millett Hall (2,661); Oxford, OH
February 15, 2025; 3:30 pm, ESPN+		at Eastern Michigan	L 73–80	15–10 (8–4)	13 – Adams	6 – Ford	3 – Tied	George Gervin GameAbove Center (2,813); Ypsilanti, MI
February 18, 2025; 7:00 pm, ESPN+		Ball State	W 67–66	16–10 (9–4)	18 – Adams	9 – Simmons	3 – Tied	Savage Arena (3,947); Toledo, OH
February 21, 2025; 6:00 pm, CBSSN		Bowling Green	L 68–69	16–11 (9–5)	21 – Lewis	11 – Ford	7 – Adams	Savage Arena (6,837); Toledo, OH
February 25, 2025; 7:00 pm, ESPN+		at Kent State	L 65–105	16–12 (9–6)	17 – Lewis	7 – Simmons	3 – Adams	MAC Center (2,104); Kent, OH
March 1, 2025; 4:30 pm, ESPN+		at Buffalo	L 74–87	16–13 (9–7)	21 – Simmons	7 – Simmons	5 – Adams	Alumni Arena (2,597); Amherst, NY
March 4, 2025; 7:00 pm, ESPN+		Akron	L 87–96	16–14 (9–8)	23 – Lewis	6 – Simmons	5 – Adams	Savage Arena (4,145); Toledo, OH
March 7, 2025; 7:00 pm, ESPN+		Ohio	W 96–82	17–14 (10–8)	22 – Simmons	9 – Hubbard	5 – Adams	Savage Arena (5,397); Toledo, OH
MAC tournament
March 13, 2025; 1:30 pm, ESPN+	(4)	vs. (5) Ohio; Quarterfinals	W 90–85 ^{OT}	18–14	26 – Adams	13 – Wilson	3 – Wilson	Rocket Arena; Cleveland, OH
March 14, 2025; 5:00 pm, CBSSN	(4)	vs. (1) Akron; Semifinals	L 90–100	18–15	28 – S. Hubbard	7 – J. Simmons	3 – S. Wilson	Rocket Arena; Cleveland, OH
*Non-conference game. ^{#}Rankings from AP Poll. (#) Tournament seedings in parentheses. All times are in Eastern.
