= 2024–25 Appalachian State Mountaineers men's basketball team =

American college basketball season

2024–25 Appalachian State Mountaineers men's basketball
- Conference: Sun Belt Conference
- Record: 17–14 (10–8 Sun Belt)
- Head coach: Dustin Kerns (6th season)
- Associate head coach: Frank Young
- Assistant coaches: Tanner Smith; Bob Szorc; Raheem Martin
- Home arena: Holmes Center

2024–25 Sun Belt Conference men's basketball standings
	Conf.				Overall
Team	W		L	PCT	W		L	PCT
South Alabama	13	–	5	.722	21	–	11	.656
James Madison	13	–	5	.722	20	–	12	.625
Troy †	13	–	5	.722	23	–	11	.676
Arkansas State	13	–	5	.722	25	–	11	.694
Marshall	12	–	6	.667	20	–	13	.606
Appalachian State	10	–	8	.556	17	–	14	.548
Texas State	9	–	9	.500	16	–	16	.500
Georgia State	8	–	10	.444	14	–	19	.424
Georgia Southern	8	–	10	.444	17	–	16	.515
Old Dominion	8	–	10	.444	15	–	20	.429
Louisiana	8	–	10	.444	12	–	21	.364
Southern Miss	5	–	13	.278	11	–	22	.333
Coastal Carolina	3	–	15	.167	10	–	22	.313
Louisiana–Monroe	3	–	15	.167	7	–	25	.219
† 2025 Sun Belt tournament winner

The 2024–25 Appalachian State Mountaineers men's basketball team represented Appalachian State University in the 2024–25 NCAA Division I men's basketball season. The Mountaineers, led by sixth-year head coach Dustin Kerns, played their home games at the Holmes Center in Boone, North Carolina as members of the Sun Belt Conference.

== Previous season ==
The Mountaineers finished the 2023–24 season 27–7, 16–2 in Sun Belt play to finish as the 2023–24 Sun Belt regular season champions. The Mountaineers lost to Arkansas State in the second round of the Sun Belt tournament. They lost to Wake Forest in the first round of the National Invitation Tournament.

== Offseason ==
=== Departures ===
Name	Number	Pos.	Height	Weight	Year	Hometown	Reason for departure
Joshua Hayes	22	F	6'9"	220	Freshman	Gainesville, FL	Transferred to Northwest Florida State College
Jordan Marsh	4	G	5'10"	165	Freshman	Charlotte, NC	Transferred to UNC Asheville
Etienne Strothers	5	G	6'2"	170	Freshman	Newport News, VA	Transferred to Hampton
Justin Abson	21	F	6'9"	235	Sophomore	Pompano Beach, FL	Transferred to Georgia
Xavion Brown	0	G	6'3"	180	Junior	Sacramento, CA	Transferred to Dallas Baptist
Terence Harcum	23	G	6'3"	190	Junior	Butner, NC	Transferred to Murray State
Christopher Mantis	2	F	6'7"	185	Junior	Lowell, IN	Transferred to Maine
Tre'Von Spillers	24	F	6'7"	205	Junior	Charleston, SC	Transferred to Wake Forest
Bryant Greene (Walk-on)	14	G	6'1"	175	GS Senior	Boone, NC	Graduated
Donovan Gregory	11	F	6'5"	190	GS Senior	Charlotte, NC	Graduated

=== Incoming transfers ===
Name	Number	Pos.	Height	Weight	Year	Hometown	Previous School
Jalil Beaubrum	7	F	6'9"	240	Junior	Miramar, FL	Stephen F. Austin
Dior Conners	4	G	6'3"	183	Junior	Columbus, OH	Triton
Alonzo Dodd	2	G	6'1"	170	Junior	Saint Paul, MN	Texas A&M Commerce
Ben Ezeagu	6	F	6'7"	210	Junior	Toronto, ON	Hill
Jamil Muttilib	10	G	6'6"	189	Junior	Houston, TX	Kilgore
Will Coble	20	G	6'4"	185	GS	Charlotte, NC	Randolph-Macon
Jackson Threadgill	0	G	6'6"	200	GS	Concord, NC	Charlotte

=== 2024 recruiting class ===
College recruiting information
Name	Hometown	School	Height	Weight	Commit date
Anthony Alston; G	Fayetteville, NC	Grayson	6 ft 3 in (1.91 m)	180 lb (82 kg)	
Anthony Alston; G	Recruit ratings: (NR)				
Jason Clarke Jr. G	Silver Spring, MD	Miller School	6 ft 0 in (1.83 m)	177 lb (80 kg)	
Jason Clarke Jr. G	Recruit ratings: (NR)				
Michael Marcus Jr. F	Indian Trail, NC	Covenant Day	6 ft 9 in (2.06 m)	255 lb (116 kg)	
Michael Marcus Jr. F	Recruit ratings: (NR)				
Jonah Long; G	Hickory, NC	St. Stephens	6 ft 4 in (1.93 m)	190 lb (86 kg)	
Jonah Long; G	Recruit ratings: (NR)				
Andrin Njock; F	Winterthur, CH	École nouvelle de la Suisse romande	6 ft 6 in (1.98 m)	205 lb (93 kg)	Sep 5, 2024
Andrin Njock; F	Recruit ratings: (NR)				
Cameron O'Kelley; G	Seneca, SC	Seneca	6 ft 3 in (1.91 m)	165 lb (75 kg)	
Cameron O'Kelley; G	Recruit ratings: (NR)				
Overall recruit ranking:
Note: In many cases, Scout, Rivals, 247Sports, On3, and ESPN may conflict in their listings of height and weight.; In these cases, the average was taken. ESPN grades are on a 100-point scale.; Sources: "2024 Team Ranking". Rivals.

== Preseason ==
=== Preseason Sun Belt Conference poll ===
The Mountaineers were picked to finish in sixth place in the conference's preseason poll. Graduate forward CJ Huntley was named to the preseason All-SBC Second Team. Senior guard Myles Tate was named to the conference preseason third team.

Coaches poll
Predicted finish	Team (1st place Votes)
1	Arkansas State - 193 (12)
2	James Madison - 170 (1)
3	Troy - 155 (1)
4	Louisiana - 144
5	Southern Miss - 133
6	App State - 122
7	Texas State - 89
T8	Georgia Southern - 85
T8	Old Dominion - 85
10	Marshall - 79
11	South Alabama - 78
12	Georgia State - 75
13	Coastal Carolina - 34
14	ULM - 28

== Roster ==
2024–25 Appalachian State Mountaineers men's basketball team
Players
Coaches

Pos.	#	Name	Height	Weight	Year	Previous school	Hometown
F	--	Andrin Njock	6 ft 6 in (1.98 m)	205 lb (93 kg)	Fr	École nouvelle de la Suisse romande	Winterthur, CH
G	0	Threadgill Jackson	6 ft 6 in (1.98 m)	200 lb (91 kg)	GS	Davidson Day School; Charlotte	Concord, NC
G	2	Alonzo Dodd	6 ft 1 in (1.85 m)	170 lb (77 kg)	Jr	South St. Paul; Texas A&M Commerce	St. Paul, MN
C	3	Luke Wilson	6 ft 9 in (2.06 m)	285 lb (129 kg)	So	Augusta Christian School	Augusta, GA
G	4	Dior Connors	6 ft 3 in (1.91 m)	183 lb (83 kg)	Jr	Pickerington North; Triton	Columbus, OH
G	5	Jason Clarke Jr.	6 ft 0 in (1.83 m)	170 lb (77 kg)	Fr	Miller School	Silver Spring, MD
F	6	Ben Ezeagu	6 ft 7 in (2.01 m)	210 lb (95 kg)	Jr	Potters House; Hill	Toronto, ON
F	7	Jalil Beaubrun	6 ft 9 in (2.06 m)	240 lb (109 kg)	Sr	Montverde; Stephen F. Austin	Miramar, FL
G	8	Anthony Alston	6 ft 3 in (1.91 m)	180 lb (82 kg)	Fr	Grayson	Fayetteville, NC
G	10	Jamil Muttilib	6 ft 6 in (1.98 m)	189 lb (86 kg)	Jr	Cypress Ridge HS; Kilgore	Houston, TX
G	12	Myles Tate	6 ft 0 in (1.83 m)	170 lb (77 kg)	Sr	Dorman HS; Butler	Spartanburg, SC
G	13	Jonah Long	6 ft 4 in (1.93 m)	190 lb (86 kg)	Fr	St. Stephens HS	Hickory, NC
G	14	Cameron O'Kelley	6 ft 3 in (1.91 m)	165 lb (75 kg)	Fr	Seneca Senior HS	Seneca, SC
F	15	C. J. Huntley	6 ft 10 in (2.08 m)	221 lb (100 kg)	GS	Davidson Day School	Huntersville, NC
G	20	Will Coble	6 ft 4 in (1.93 m)	185 lb (84 kg)	GS	Davidson Day; Randolph-Macon	Charlotte, NC
G	32	Luke Ledford	6 ft 3 in (1.91 m)	190 lb (86 kg)	So	Broughton HS	Raleigh, NC
F	44	Michael Marcus, Jr.	6 ft 9 in (2.06 m)	155 lb (70 kg)	Fr	Covenant Day	Indian Trail, NC

Head coach

- Dustin Kerns (Clemson)

Assistant coach(es)

- Frank Young (West Virginia)
- Tanner Smith (Clemson)
- Bob Szorc (St. John's)
- Raheem Martin (Greensboro)

Legend

- (C) Team captain
- (S) Suspended
- (I) Ineligible
- (W) Walk-on
- Injured
- Current redshirt

Roster
Last update: August 28, 2024

== Schedule ==
Date time, TV	Rank^{#}	Opponent^{#}	Result	Record	High points	High rebounds	High assists	Site (attendance) city, state
Regular season
November 4, 2024*; 6:30 p.m., ESPN+		Miami (OH)	L 63–77	0–1	21 – Tate	7 – Muttilib	5 – Tate	Holmes Center (3,193); Boone, NC
November 6, 2024*; 7:30 p.m., ESPN+		St. Andrews	W 108–54	1–1	18 – Marcus	10 – Marcus	4 – Tied	Holmes Center (1,622); Boone, NC
November 10, 2024*; 12:00 p.m., B1G+		at Wisconsin	L 56–87	1–2	13 – Huntley	6 – Tied	5 – Tate	Kohl Center (13,913); Madison, WI
November 19, 2024*; 6:30 p.m., ESPN+		Queens	W 65–53	2–2	27 – Huntley	8 – Tied	4 – Threadgill	Holmes Center (2,678); Boone, NC
November 24, 2024*; 1:00 p.m., ESPN+		William & Mary	W 79–76	3–2	20 – Myles	7 – Tied	10 – Myles	Holmes Center (2,852); Boone, NC
November 27, 2024*; 4:00 p.m., FloHoops		vs. Sam Houston; Live Oak Bank Holiday Classic	W 66–63	4–2	19 – Conners	9 – Beaubrun	4 – Tate	Trask Coliseum (2,519); Wilmington, NC
November 29, 2024*; 12:00 p.m., FloHoops		vs. Colgate; Live Oak Bank Holiday Classic	W 72–50	5–2	15 – Tate	7 – Tied	9 – Tate	Trask Coliseum (2,646); Wilmington, NC
November 30, 2024*; 3:00 p.m., FloHoops		vs. UNC Wilmington; Live Oak Bank Holiday Classic	L 61–76	5–3	17 – Huntley	11 – Beaubrun	3 – Tate	Trask Coliseum (3,801); Wilmington, NC
December 3, 2024*; 6:30 p.m., ESPN+		Mid-Atlantic	W 85–43	6–3	19 – Dodd	10 – Marcus Jr.	7 – Tate	Holmes Center (1,396); Boone, NC
December 14, 2024*; 2:00 p.m., ESPN+		vs. High Point	L 59–65	6–4	24 – Tate	8 – Tied	4 – Tate	Novant Health Fieldhouse (1,245); Greensboro, NC
December 18, 2024; 8:00 p.m., ESPN+		at Louisiana	L 62–68	6–5 (0–1)	15 – Conners	7 – Tate	3 – Tate	Cajundome (1,391); Lafayette, LA
December 20, 2024*; 6:00 p.m., ESPN+		at North Texas	L 64–68	6–6	21 – Tate	5 – Beaubrun	5 – Tate	The Super Pit (2,666); Denton, TX
January 2, 2025; 6:30 p.m., ESPN+		Troy	L 61–69	6–7 (0–2)	20 – Tate	7 – Beaubrun	7 – Dodd	Holmes Center (2,408); Boone, NC
January 4, 2025; 1:00 p.m., ESPN+		Texas State	W 72–61	7–7 (1–2)	22 – Tate	10 – Huntley	6 – Tate	Holmes Center (2,512); Boone, NC
January 8, 2025; 6:30 p.m., ESPN+		Coastal Carolina	W 74–51	8–7 (2–2)	21 – Huntley	15 – Huntley	7 – Tate	Holmes Center (1,703); Boone, NC
January 11, 2025; 1:00 p.m., ESPN+		James Madison	W 86–66	9–7 (3–2)	21 – Tied	8 – Huntley	7 – Tate	Holmes Center (2,405); Boone, NC
January 16, 2025; 7:00 p.m., ESPN+		at Old Dominion	W 62–43	10–7 (4–2)	26 – Huntley	12 – Huntley	7 – Tate	Chartway Arena (4,529); Norfolk, VA
January 18, 2025; 4:00 p.m., ESPN+		at James Madison	W 58–50	11–7 (5–2)	20 – Tate	8 – Tate	8 – Tate	Atlantic Union Bank Center; Harrisonburg, VA
January 23, 2025; 9:00 p.m., ESPN2		at Arkansas State	L 55–65	11–8 (5–3)	22 – Huntley	8 – Tate	6 – Tate	First National Bank Arena; Jonesboro, AR
January 25, 2025; 3:00 p.m., ESPN+		at Louisiana–Monroe	W 66–58	12–8 (6–3)	16 – Tate	12 – Huntley	3 – Huntley	Fant–Ewing Coliseum (1,505); Monroe, LA
January 29, 2025; 6:30 p.m., ESPN+		Old Dominion	L 77–78	12–9 (6–4)	23 – Tate	10 – Huntley	8 – Tate	Holmes Center (3,249); Boone, NC
February 1, 2025; 1:00 p.m., ESPN+		Georgia State	W 80–76	13–9 (7–4)	25 – Tate	13 – Huntley	6 – Tate	Holmes Center (3,498); Boone, NC
February 5, 2025; 6:30 p.m., ESPN+		Southern Miss	W 60–58	14–9 (8–4)	20 – Huntley	12 – Huntley	11 – Tate	Holmes Center (2,236); Boone, NC
February 8, 2025*; 2:00 p.m., ESPN+		at Ohio; MAC-SBC Challenge	W 72–59	15–9	27 – Tate	9 – Huntley	7 – Tate	Convocation Center (6,305); Athens, OH
February 13, 2025; 7:00 p.m., ESPN+		at Coastal Carolina	W 64–46	16–9 (9–4)	17 – Tied	10 – Tate	4 – Tate	HTC Center (1,925); Conway, SC
February 15, 2025; 2:00 p.m., ESPN+		at Georgia State	L 65–70	16–10 (9–5)	16 – Tate	10 – Huntley	6 – Tate	GSU Convocation Center (1,720); Atlanta, GA
February 20, 2025; 6:30 p.m., ESPN+		Georgia Southern	W 79–74 ^{OT}	17–10 (10–5)	26 – Tate	10 – Huntley	5 – Tate	Holmes Center (3,152); Boone, NC
February 22, 2025; 1:00 p.m., ESPN+		Marshall	L 59–69	17–11 (10–6)	27 – Huntley	9 – Beaubrun	4 – Tate	Holmes Center (4,310); Boone, NC
February 25, 2025; 5:00 p.m., ESPN+		at Georgia Southern	L 59–61	17–12 (10–7)	23 – Huntley	10 – Huntley	4 – Dodd	Hill Convocation Center (1,821); Statesboro, GA
February 28, 2025; 9:00 p.m., ESPNU		at Marshall	L 57–75	17–13 (10–8)	19 – Tate	10 – Huntley	3 – Tied	Cam Henderson Center (5,223); Huntington, WV
Sun Belt tournament
March 7, 2025; 8:30 p.m., ESPN+	(6)	vs. (10) Old Dominion; Fourth round	L 56–61	17–14	18 – Huntley	12 – Huntley	5 – Dodd	Pensacola Bay Center; Pensacola, FL
*Non-conference game. ^{#}Rankings from AP Poll. (#) Tournament seedings in parentheses. All times are in Eastern Time.
