= 2024–25 Arkansas State Red Wolves men's basketball team =

American college basketball season

2024–25 Arkansas State Red Wolves men's basketball

Sun Belt regular season co-champions

NIT, Second Round
- Conference: Sun Belt Conference
- Record: 25–11 (13–5 Sun Belt)
- Head coach: Bryan Hodgson (2nd season)
- Assistant coaches: Jamie Quarles; Tee Butters; Derek Rongstad
- Home arena: First National Bank Arena

2024–25 Sun Belt Conference men's basketball standings
	Conf.				Overall
Team	W		L	PCT	W		L	PCT
South Alabama	13	–	5	.722	21	–	11	.656
James Madison	13	–	5	.722	20	–	12	.625
Troy †	13	–	5	.722	23	–	11	.676
Arkansas State	13	–	5	.722	25	–	11	.694
Marshall	12	–	6	.667	20	–	13	.606
Appalachian State	10	–	8	.556	17	–	14	.548
Texas State	9	–	9	.500	16	–	16	.500
Georgia State	8	–	10	.444	14	–	19	.424
Georgia Southern	8	–	10	.444	17	–	16	.515
Old Dominion	8	–	10	.444	15	–	20	.429
Louisiana	8	–	10	.444	12	–	21	.364
Southern Miss	5	–	13	.278	11	–	22	.333
Coastal Carolina	3	–	15	.167	10	–	22	.313
Louisiana–Monroe	3	–	15	.167	7	–	25	.219
† 2025 Sun Belt tournament winner

The 2024–25 Arkansas State Red Wolves men's basketball team represented Arkansas State University in the 2024–25 NCAA Division I men's basketball season. The Red Wolves, led by second-year head coach Bryan Hodgson, played their home games at the First National Bank Arena in Jonesboro, Arkansas as members of the Sun Belt Conference.

== Previous season ==
The Red Wolves finished the 2023–24 season 20–17, 11–7 in Sun Belt play to finish in 4th place. They defeated Louisiana in the quarterfinals and Appalachian State in the semifinals of the Sun Belt tournament before losing to James Madison in the championship game.

They were invited to play in the College Basketball Invitational, where they defeated Bethune–Cookman in the first round and Montana in the quarterfinals before losing to High Point in the semifinals.

== Preseason ==
=== Preseason Sun Belt Conference poll ===
The Red Wolves were picked to finish in first place in the conference's preseason poll. Redshirt senior forward Kobe Julien was named the preseason player of the year and to the preseason All-SBC First Team. Senior guard Taryn Todd was named to the conference preseason second team. Junior forward Izaiyah Nelson was named to the conference preseason third team.

Coaches poll
Predicted finish	Team (1st place Votes)
1	Arkansas State - 193 (12)
2	James Madison - 170 (1)
3	Troy - 155 (1)
4	Louisiana - 144
5	Southern Miss - 133
6	App State - 122
7	Texas State - 89
T8	Georgia Southern - 85
T8	Old Dominion - 85
10	Marshall - 79
11	South Alabama - 78
12	Georgia State - 75
13	Coastal Carolina - 34
14	ULM - 28

== Roster ==
2024–25 Arkansas State Red Wolves men's basketball team
Players
Coaches

Pos.	#	Name	Height	Weight	Year	Previous school	Hometown
F	0	Rashaud Marshall	6 ft 8 in (2.03 m)	225 lb (102 kg)	So	Blytheville High School	Blytheville, Arkansas
F	1	Josh Hill	6 ft 11 in (2.11 m)	201 lb (91 kg)	Fr	Wheeler High School	Laurel, Maryland
F	2	Justin Johnson	6 ft 8 in (2.03 m)	195 lb (88 kg)	Fr	Putnam Science Academy	Miami, Florida
G	3	Derrian Ford	6 ft 3 in (1.91 m)	212 lb (96 kg)	Jr	Arkansas	Magnolia, Arkansas
G	4	Cody Head	6 ft 2 in (1.88 m)	194 lb (88 kg)	So	Lipscomb	Cleveland, Ohio
G	5	Joseph Pinion	6 ft 5 in (1.96 m)	200 lb (91 kg)	Jr	Arkansas	Morrilton, Arkansas
G	6	Taryn Todd	6 ft 4 in (1.93 m)	177 lb (80 kg)	Sr	Northwest Florida State College	Vaughan, Ontario, Canada
G	7	Zane Butler	5 ft 11 in (1.8 m)	166 lb (75 kg)	Sr	Navarro College	Paragould, Arkansas
F	8	Kobe Julien	6 ft 6 in (1.98 m)	217 lb (98 kg)	RS Sr	Louisiana	Baton Rouge, Louisiana
G	10	Avery Felts (W)	6 ft 2 in (1.88 m)	192 lb (87 kg)	RS Sr	Westside HS	Bono, Arkansas
G	11	Terrance Ford Jr.	6 ft 1 in (1.85 m)	177 lb (80 kg)	RS So	Victory Rock Prep	Chicago, Illinois
F	13	Kameron Johnson	6 ft 7 in (2.01 m)	223 lb (101 kg)	Jr	Collin College	Miami, Florida
F	25	R'Chaun King	6 ft 6 in (1.98 m)	230 lb (104 kg)	Fr	Bartlett High School	Memphis, Tennessee
G	30	Jacob St. Clair	6 ft 3 in (1.91 m)	175 lb (79 kg)	RS Fr	Sand Rock HS	Sand Rock, Alabama
F	35	Izaiyah Nelson	6 ft 10 in (2.08 m)	218 lb (99 kg)	Jr	Marietta HS	Marietta, Georgia
F	45	Dyondre Dominguez	6 ft 8 in (2.03 m)	209 lb (95 kg)	Sr	UMass	Providence, Rhode Island

Head coach

- Bryan Hodgson (Fredonia State)

Assistant coach(es)

- Jamie Quarles (Augusta State)
- Tee Butters (Clemson)
- Derek Rongstad (UW–Whitewater)

Legend

- (C) Team captain
- (S) Suspended
- (I) Ineligible
- (W) Walk-on
- Injured
- Current redshirt

Roster
Last update: 17 October 2024

== Schedule and results ==
Date time, TV	Rank^{#}	Opponent^{#}	Result	Record	High points	High rebounds	High assists	Site (attendance) city, state
Exhibition
October 26, 2024*; 11:00 a.m.		Trevecca Nazarene	W 78–71		21 – Ford	7 – Tied	5 – Todd	First National Bank Arena (1,783); Jonesboro, AR
Non-conference regular season
November 4, 2024*; 7:00 p.m., ESPN+		Akron; MAC-SBC Challenge	W 80–75 ^{OT}	1–0	16 – Pinion	10 – Marshall	5 – Tied	First National Bank Arena (4,610); Jonesboro, AR
November 8, 2024*; 7:00 p.m., SECN+/ESPN+		at No. 2 Alabama	L 79–88	1–1	20 – Julien	8 – Marshall	3 – Tied	Coleman Coliseum (13,474); Tuscaloosa, AL
November 12, 2024*; 7:00 p.m., ESPN+		Little Rock	W 80–63	2–1	17 – Todd	11 – Marshall	7 – Ford Jr.	First National Bank Arena (5,187); Jonesboro, AR
November 16, 2024*; 2:00 p.m., ESPN+		Stephen F. Austin	W 59–49	3–1	21 – Todd	9 – Tied	4 – Todd	First National Bank Arena (4,129); Jonesboro, AR
November 22, 2024*; 7:00 p.m., ESPN+		Lane College	W 103–60	4–1	20 – J. Johnson	8 – J. Johnson	8 – Head	First National Bank Arena (4,056); Jonesboro, AR
November 29, 2024*; 3:30 p.m., FloHoops		vs. Indiana State; Baha Mar Hoops Nassau Championship	W 86–81	5–1	18 – Ford	10 – Marshall	4 – Todd	Baha Mar Convention Center (392); Nassau, The Bahamas
November 30, 2024*; 6:00 p.m., FloHoops		vs. Rice; Baha Mar Hoops Nassau Championship	L 67–75	5–2	13 – Ford Jr.	9 – Ford	3 – Ford Jr.	Baha Mar Convention Center (333); Nassau, The Bahamas
December 1, 2024*; 3:30 p.m., FloHoops		vs. Hofstra; Baha Mar Hoops Nassau Championship	L 66–68	5–3	17 – Ford	6 – Tied	2 – Tied	Baha Mar Convention Center (376); Nassau, The Bahamas
December 5, 2024*; 7:00 p.m., ESPN+		Jackson State	W 66–64	6–3	15 – Todd	9 – Tied	3 – Tied	First National Bank Arena (3,221); Jonesboro, AR
December 8, 2024*; 3:00 p.m., ESPNU		at No. 16 Memphis	W 85–72	7–3	22 – Pinion	8 – Tied	4 – Tied	FedExForum (10,983); Memphis, TN
December 12, 2024*; 7:00 p.m., ESPN+		UT Arlington	W 83–79	8–3	23 – Todd	8 – Todd	4 – Todd	First National Bank Arena (4,914); Jonesboro, AR
December 15, 2024*; 5:00 p.m., ESPN+		at UAB	W 98–89 ^{OT}	9–3	31 – Todd	14 – Nelson	5 – Todd	Bartow Arena (4,108); Birmingham, AL
Sun Belt regular season
December 21, 2024; 2:00 p.m., ESPN+		Coastal Carolina	W 97–67	10–3 (1–0)	26 – Hill	7 – Nelson	11 – Ford Jr.	First National Bank Arena (5,035); Jonesboro, AR
January 2, 2025; 6:00 p.m., ESPN+		at Old Dominion	W 78–59	11–3 (2–0)	21 – Ford Jr.	9 – Nelson	5 – Tied	Chartway Arena (3,918); Norfolk, VA
January 4, 2025; 3:00 p.m., ESPN+		at James Madison	L 62–67	11–4 (2–1)	26 – Todd	7 – Ford	2 – Tied	Atlantic Union Bank Center (5,079); Harrisonburg, VA
January 9, 2025; 7:00 p.m., ESPN+		at South Alabama	L 62–76	11–5 (2–2)	18 – Todd	9 – Pinion	4 – Felts	Mitchell Center (2,208); Mobile, AL
January 11, 2025; 3:30 p.m., ESPN+		at Troy	W 84–78	12–5 (3–2)	21 – Todd	7 – Todd	8 – Ford Jr.	Trojan Arena (3,456); Troy, AL
January 16, 2025; 7:00 p.m., ESPN+		Louisiana	W 83–63	13–5 (4–2)	15 – Julien	8 – Tied	6 – Ford Jr.	First National Bank Arena (5,248); Jonesboro, AR
January 18, 2025; 2:30 p.m., ESPN+		Georgia State	W 85–59	14–5 (5–2)	14 – Pinion	12 – Nelson	8 – Ford Jr.	First National Bank Arena (5,617); Jonesboro, AR
January 23, 2025; 8:00 p.m., ESPN2		Appalachian State	W 65–55	15–5 (6–2)	18 – Julien	11 – Marshall	7 – Ford Jr.	First National Bank Arena (6,212); Jonesboro, AR
January 25, 2025; 2:00 p.m., ESPN+		Texas State	W 80–65	16–5 (7–2)	19 – Ford	12 – Marshall	8 – Ford Jr.	First National Bank Arena (5,791); Jonesboro, AR
January 29, 2025; 7:00 p.m., ESPN+		at Southern Miss	W 81–68	17–5 (8–2)	25 – Todd	9 – Tied	3 – Todd	Reed Green Coliseum (3,089); Hattiesburg, MS
February 1, 2025; 4:00 p.m., ESPN+		at Texas State	W 85–74	18–5 (9–2)	23 – Nelson	11 – Nelson	5 – Ford Jr.	Strahan Arena (1,441); San Marcos, TX
February 5, 2025; 8:00 p.m., ESPNU		at Marshall	L 72–77	18–6 (9–3)	21 – Pinion	10 – Julien	8 – Ford Jr.	Cam Henderson Center (4,309); Huntington, WV
February 8, 2025*; 1:00 p.m., ESPN+		at Kent State; MAC-SBC Challenge	L 75–76	18–7	20 – Pinion	7 – Nelson	5 – Todd	Memorial Athletic and Convocation Center (1,746); Kent, OH
February 12, 2025; 7:30 p.m., ESPN+		Southern Miss	W 101–67	19–7 (10–3)	20 – Julien	8 – Tied	11 – Ford Jr.	First National Bank Arena (5,089); Jonesboro, AR
February 15, 2025; 7:00 p.m., ESPN2		Troy	L 70–71	19–8 (10–4)	18 – Ford Jr.	14 – Nelson	5 – Ford Jr.	First National Bank Arena (7,036); Jonesboro, AR
February 19, 2025; 7:00 p.m., ESPN+		South Alabama	L 56–60	19–9 (10–5)	17 – Pinion	23 – Nelson	5 – Todd	First National Bank Arena (5,124); Jonesboro, AR
February 22, 2025; 2:00 p.m., ESPN+		Louisiana–Monroe	W 95–70	20–9 (11–5)	20 – Dominguez	10 – Nelson	6 – Ford Jr.	First National Bank Arena (6,273); Jonesboro, AR
February 26, 2025; 7:30 p.m., ESPN+		at Louisiana	W 83–64	21–9 (12–5)	30 – Nelson	21 – Nelson	5 – Ford Jr.	Cajundome (1,635); Lafayette, LA
February 28, 2025; 6:30 p.m., ESPN+		at Louisiana–Monroe	W 94–67	22–9 (13–5)	21 – Pinion	19 – Nelson	10 – Ford Jr.	Fant–Ewing Coliseum (1,574); Monroe, LA
Sun Belt tournament
March 8, 2025; 5:30 p.m., ESPN+	(4)	vs. (5) Marshall; Quarterfinals	W 77–74	23–9	19 – Todd	14 – Nelson	3 – Ford Jr.	Pensacola Bay Center (2,370); Pensacola, FL
March 9, 2025; 5:00 p.m., ESPN+	(4)	vs. (1) South Alabama; Semifinals	W 74–71	24–9	23 – Pinion	6 – Tied	5 – Pinion	Pensacola Bay Center (3,191); Pensacola, FL
March 10, 2025; 6:00 p.m., ESPN2	(4)	vs. (3) Troy; Championship	L 81–94	24–10	19 – Dominguez	10 – Nelson	7 – Ford Jr.	Pensacola Bay Center (3,187); Pensacola, FL
NIT
March 18, 2025; 8:00 p.m., ESPNU	(3)	Saint Louis; First round – Dallas Region	W 103–78	25–10	26 – Nelson	10 – Nelson	7 – Tied	First National Bank Arena (3,143); Jonesboro, AR
March 23, 2025; 6:00 p.m., ESPNU	(3)	at (2) North Texas; Second round – Dallas Region	L 63–65	25–11	16 – Nelson	14 – Nelson	5 – Todd	The Super Pit (2,661); Denton, TX
*Non-conference game. ^{#}Rankings from AP Poll. (#) Tournament seedings in parentheses. All times are in Central.
