= 2024–25 Ohio Bobcats men's basketball team =

American college basketball season

2024–25 Ohio Bobcats men's basketball
- Conference: Mid-American Conference
- Record: 16–16 (10–8 MAC)
- Head coach: Jeff Boals (6th season)
- Assistant coaches: Lamar Thornton (6th season); Kyle Barlow (6th season); Lee Martin (5th season)
- Home arena: Convocation Center

2024–25 Mid-American Conference men's basketball standings
	Conf.				Overall
Team	W		L	PCT	W		L	PCT
Akron †	17	–	1	.944	28	–	7	.800
Miami (OH)	14	–	4	.778	25	–	9	.735
Kent State	11	–	7	.611	24	–	12	.667
Toledo	10	–	8	.556	18	–	15	.545
Ohio	10	–	8	.556	16	–	16	.500
Western Michigan	9	–	9	.500	12	–	20	.375
Eastern Michigan	9	–	9	.500	16	–	16	.500
Bowling Green	8	–	10	.444	14	–	18	.438
Ball State	7	–	11	.389	14	–	17	.452
Central Michigan	7	–	11	.389	14	–	17	.452
Buffalo	4	–	14	.222	9	–	22	.290
Northern Illinois	2	–	16	.111	6	–	25	.194
† 2025 MAC tournament winner

The 2024–25 Ohio University Bobcats men's basketball team represented Ohio University for the 2024–25 NCAA Division I men's basketball season. The Bobcats were led by fifth-year head coach Jeff Boals, a 1995 graduate of Ohio University. They played their home games at the Convocation Center in Athens, Ohio, as a member of the Mid-American Conference (MAC).

After returning most of the team the finished tied for second in the MAC the prior season, the Bobcats were picked to win the conference but finished with a 16–16 record. They posted a disappointing 6–6 record entering 2025 prior to the start of league play. They finished tied for fourth in the MAC with a 10–6 conference record and lost their January matchup in the MAC-SBC challenge. With a first round loss to Toledo, they failed to reach the MAC tournament semifinals for the first time since 2020 when the tournament was cancelled due to coronavirus pandemic.

== Previous season ==
The Bobcats finished the 2023–24 season 6–7 in non-conference play and started 1–3 in conference play. They rallied to win 12 of their final 14 conference games to finish the regular season 19–12 with a 13–5 in MAC play, to finish tied for 2nd place. They defeated Western Michigan in the first round of the MAC tournament and lost to Akron in the second round.

== Offseason ==
For the second straight season the Bobcats avoided significant losses to the transfer portal as the only scholarship player that played the prior season to transfer was Ike Cornish who averaged 11 minutes per game the prior year. The team lost point guard Jaylin Hunter, who started all 33 games, guard Miles Brown, who started 17, and center Gabe Wiznitzer who averaged 14 minutes to graduation.

=== Coaching Staff Changes ===
==== Coaching Departures ====
Coaching Departures
Name	Alma Mater	Previous position	New position
Casey Crawford	Ohio University	Graduate Assistant	Director of Basketball Operations (Stony Brook)

==== Coaching Additions ====
Coaching Additions
Name	Alma Mater	Previous position	New position
Keith Williams	University of Charleston	Player (Charleston)	Graduate Assistant

=== Departures ===
Departures
Name	Number	Pos.	Height	Weight	Year	Hometown	Reason
Miles Brown	2	G	6'1"	180	Grad. student	Rochester, NY	Graduated, exhausted eligibility
Gabe Wiznitzer	11	C	6'11"	240	Senior	Walhalla, SC	Graduated
Jaylin Hunter	12	G	6'0"	195	Senior	Manchester, CT	Graduated, exhausted eligibility
Quinn Corna*	15	G	6'3"	170	Sophomore	Columbus, OH	Transferred to Ohio Wesleyan
IJ Ezuma	21	F	6'8"	240	RS Sophomore	Raleigh, NC	Transferred to South Plains College
Ike Cornish	24	G/F	6'6"	190	RS Sophomore	Baltimore, MD	Transferred to Nicholls State

* Walk-on in 2023–24

=== Incoming transfers ===
Incoming transfers
Name	Number	Pos.	Height	Weight	Year	Hometown	Reason
Jackson Paveletzke	13	PG	6'3"	175	Sophomore	Kimberly, WI	Transferred from Iowa State. Will have two years of eligibility remaining.
Victor Searls	35	C	6'9"	240	Senior	Hilliard, OH	Transferred from Ashland. Will have one year of eligibility remaining.

=== Recruiting class ===
College recruiting information
Name	Hometown	School	Height	Weight	Commit date
Ayden Evans; PF	Radcliff, KY	Elizabethtown	6 ft 8 in (2.03 m)	200 lb (91 kg)	Jul 15, 2023
Ayden Evans; PF	Recruit ratings: Scout: Rivals: 247Sports: (80)				
Jessie Burris; SG	Delaware, OH	Rutherford B. Hayes	6 ft 3 in (1.91 m)	180 lb (82 kg)	Jul 9, 2023
Jessie Burris; SG	Recruit ratings: Scout: (78)				
Elijah Elliot; SG	Wichita, KS	Sunrise Christian Academy	6 ft 2 in (1.88 m)	170 lb (77 kg)	Apr 30, 2024
Elijah Elliot; SG	Recruit ratings: Rivals: 247Sports:				
Kiir Kuany; PF	Huntington, WV	Huntington Prep	6 ft 8 in (2.03 m)	195 lb (88 kg)	Jun 5, 2024
Kiir Kuany; PF	Recruit ratings: 247Sports:				
Chase Boals*; PF	New Albany, OH	New Albany	6 ft 5 in (1.96 m)	240 lb (110 kg)	
Chase Boals*; PF	Recruit ratings: No ratings found				
Overall recruit ranking:
Note: In many cases, Scout, Rivals, 247Sports, On3, and ESPN may conflict in their listings of height and weight.; In these cases, the average was taken. ESPN grades are on a 100-point scale.; Sources: "2024 Team Ranking". Rivals.

*Walk-on

== Preseason ==
On October 22, 2024 the MAC released the preseason coaches poll. Ohio was picked to finish first in the MAC regular season and received 11 of the 12 votes for first place. Ohio received 8 votes to win the MAC Tournament.

=== Preseason rankings ===
MAC preseason poll
Predicted finish	Team	Votes (1st place)
1	Ohio	121 (11)
2	Akron	106 (1)
3	Kent State	99
4	Toledo	95
5	Bowling Green	73
6	Miami	72
7	Ball State	67
8	Central Michigan	55
9	Eastern Michigan	36
10	Western Michigan	33
11	Northern Illinois	24
12	Buffalo	11

MAC Tournament Champions:Ohio (8), Kent State (3), Toledo (1)

=== Preseason All-MAC ===
Preseason All-MAC teams
Team	Player	Position	Year
1st	AJ Clayton	F	Sr.
2nd	AJ Brown	G	R-So.
2nd	Shereef Mitchell	G	Grad.

== Roster ==
2024–25 Ohio Bobcats men's basketball team
Players
Coaches

Pos.	#	Name	Height	Weight	Year	Previous school	Hometown
G	0	Ajay Sheldon	6 ft 1 in (1.85 m)	190 lb (86 kg)	Jr	Dublin Coffman	Dublin, OH
G	1	Elmore James	6 ft 3 in (1.91 m)	205 lb (93 kg)	Jr	Brush	Cleveland, OH
G	3	AJ Brown	6 ft 4 in (1.93 m)	210 lb (95 kg)	RS So	Orlando Christian Prep	Orlando, FL
G	4	Shereef Mitchell	6 ft 1 in (1.85 m)	175 lb (79 kg)	GS	Sunrise Christian Academy; Creighton	Omaha, NE
F	5	Ayden Evans	6 ft 8 in (2.03 m)	205 lb (93 kg)	Fr	Elizabethtown	Radcliff, KY
G	6	Elijah Elliot	6 ft 3 in (1.91 m)	180 lb (82 kg)	Fr	Oak Ridge	Orlando, FL
F	7	Ben Nicol	6 ft 7 in (2.01 m)	208 lb (94 kg)	RS Fr	George Washington	Charleston, WV
F	10	Aidan Hadaway	6 ft 8 in (2.03 m)	220 lb (100 kg)	Jr	Lafayette	Lafayette, GA
F	11	Kiir Kuany (redshirt)	6 ft 9 in (2.06 m)	195 lb (88 kg)	Fr	Huntington Prep	Melbourne, Australia
G	12	Matthew Stuewe (W)	6 ft 2 in (1.88 m)	198 lb (90 kg)	RS So	Avon Lake	Avon Lake, OH
G	13	Jackson Paveletzke	6 ft 2 in (1.88 m)	175 lb (79 kg)	Jr	Kimberly; Iowa State	Kimberly, WI
G	14	Ben Estis (W)	6 ft 1 in (1.85 m)	185 lb (84 kg)	RS So	Southlake Carroll	Southlake, TX
F	15	Chase Boals (injured) (W) (redshirt)	6 ft 5 in (1.96 m)	253 lb (115 kg)	Fr	New Albany	New Albany, OH
G	21	Jessie Burris (injured) (redshirt)	6 ft 5 in (1.96 m)	190 lb (86 kg)	Fr	Delaware Hayes	Delaware, OH
F	23	AJ Clayton	6 ft 8 in (2.03 m)	225 lb (102 kg)	Sr	Philo	Roseville, OH
F	35	Vic Searls	6 ft 9 in (2.06 m)	240 lb (109 kg)	GS	St. Charles; Ashland	Hilliard, OH

Head coach

- Jeff Boals (Ohio)

Assistant coach(es)

- Lamar Thornton (Ohio Dominican)
- Kyle Barlow (Concordia–Ann Arbor)
- Lee Martin (Catawba)

Legend

- (C) Team captain
- (S) Suspended
- (I) Ineligible
- (W) Walk-on
- Injured
- Current redshirt

Roster
Last update: March 14, 2025

=== Support staff ===
2024-25 Ohio Bobcats support staff
- Jake Ness – Director of Basketball Operations
- Mike Cifliku – Video Coordinator
- Keith Williams - Graduate Assistant
- Meredith Camacho - Head Manager
- Sara Legarsky – Senior Director of Athletics Communications
- Tyler Congrove – Associate Athletic Trainer (Men's Basketball, Soccer, Men's Golf, Women's Golf)
- Jessica Arquette – Ohio Athletics Sports Dietitian
- Kaitlyn Michener – Nutritionist
- Hannah Rastatter – Nutritionist

== Schedule and results ==
Date time, TV	Rank^{#}	Opponent^{#}	Result	Record	High points	High rebounds	High assists	Site (attendance) city, state
Non-conference regular season
November 4, 2024*; 7:00 p.m., ESPN+		at James Madison; MAC–SBC Challenge	L 78–88	0–1	17 – Hadaway	5 – Tied	4 – Clayton	Atlantic Union Bank Center (5,973); Harrisonburg, VA
November 9, 2024*; 7:00 p.m., ESPN+		UNC-Asheville	W 82–76	1–1	19 – Clayton	6 – Hadaway	5 – Tied	Convocation Center (5,438); Athens, OH
November 12, 2024*; 8:00 p.m., ESPN+		at Illinois State	L 75–85	1–2	20 – Brown	5 – Clayton	2 – Tied	CEFCU Arena (3,923); Normal, IL
November 15, 2024*; 8:00 p.m., ESPN+		at Memphis	L 70–94	1–3	20 – Sheldon	7 – Paveletzke	5 – Paveletzke	FedExForum (11,270); Memphis, TN
November 21, 2024*; 12:00 p.m., ESPNU		vs. Middle Tennessee; Myrtle Beach Invitational quarterfinals	L 81–83 ^{OT}	1–4	19 – Brown	11 – Clayton	11 – Paveletzke	HTC Center (704); Conway, SC
November 22, 2024*; 11:30 a.m., ESPNU		vs. Portland; Myrtle Beach Invitational consolation 2nd round	W 85–73	2–4	34 – Clayton	12 – Clayton	10 – Paveletzke	HTC Center (708); Conway, SC
November 24, 2024*; 8:00 p.m., ESPN2		vs. Texas State; Myrtle Beach Invitational 5th place game	L 65–74	2–5	18 – Clayton	5 – Tied	3 – James	HTC Center (1,431); Conway, SC
November 30, 2024*; 2:00 p.m., ESPN+		Robert Morris	W 84–68	3–5	16 – Clayton	7 – Tied	4 – Sheldon	Convocation Center; Athens, OH
December 7, 2024*; 2:00 p.m., ESPN+		Morehead State	W 88–76	4–5	23 – Paveletzke	8 – Paveletzke	4 – Hadaway	Convocation Center (3,128); Athens, OH
December 14, 2024*; 4:00 p.m., ESPN+		at Marshall	L 70–79	4–6	22 – Brown	8 – Searls	12 – Paveletzke	Cam Henderson Center (4,278); Huntington, WV
December 18, 2024*; 7:00 p.m., ESPN+		Austin Peay	W 78–58	5–6	22 – Clayton	5 – McCubbin	5 – Haney	Convocation Center (3,065); Athens, OH
December 30, 2024*; 7:00 p.m., ESPN+		Muskingum	W 103–52	6–6	13 – Clayton	10 – Elliott	6 – Paveletzke	Convocation Center (3,615); Athens, OH
MAC regular season
January 4, 2025; 7:00 p.m., TBA		at Central Michigan	W 57–55	7–6 (1–0)	14 – Brown	7 – Clayton	5 – Paveletzke	McGuirk Arena (1,269); Mount Pleasant, MI
January 7, 2025; 7:00 p.m., ESPN+		at Buffalo	W 88–79	8–6 (2–0)	27 – Clayton	16 – Hadaway	6 – Mitchell	Alumni Arena (968); Amherst, NY
January 11, 2025; 1:00 p.m., ESPN+		Northern Illinois	W 108–70	9–6 (3–0)	31 – Clayton	11 – Hadaway	5 – Tied	Convocation Center (4011); Athens, OH
January 14, 2025; 7:00 p.m., ESPN+		Ball State	W 86–71	10–6 (4–0)	15 – Tied	5 – Tied	6 – Paveletzke	Convocation Center (4,624); Athens, OH
January 17, 2025; 6:00 p.m., CBSSN		at Akron	L 80–92	10–7 (4–1)	27 – Mitchell	7 – Hadaway	2 – Tied	James A. Rhodes Arena (2,830); Akron, OH
January 21, 2025; 6:30 p.m., ESPN+		at Eastern Michigan	L 87–94	10–8 (4–2)	28 – Paveletzke	6 – Paveletzke	5 – Sheldon	George Gervin GameAbove Center (1,439); Ypsilanti, MI
January 24, 2025; 7:00 p.m., ESPNU		Kent State	W 61–59	11–8 (5–2)	15 – Tied	7 – Searls	3 – Sheldon	Convocation Center (5,134); Athens, OH
January 28, 2025; 7:00 p.m., ESPN2		Toledo	L 83–86	11–9 (5–3)	22 – Tied	8 – Tied	6 – Paveletzke	Convocation Center (4,442); Athens, OH
February 1, 2025; 3:30 p.m., ESPN+		at Miami (OH)	L 69–73	11–10 (5–4)	20 – Mitchell	10 – Searls	3 – Paveletzke	Millett Hall (7,889); Oxford, OH
February 4, 2025; 7:00 p.m., ESPN+		Western Michigan	W 94–69	12–10 (6–4)	18 – Clayton	9 – Paveletzke	8 – Paveletzke	Convocation Center (4,058); Athens, OH
February 8, 2025*; 2:00 p.m., ESPN+		Appalachian State; MAC–SBC Challenge	L 59–72	12–11	§18 – Brown	7 – Clayton	3 – Paveletzke	Convocation Center (6,305); Athens, OH
February 11, 2025; 7:00 p.m., ESPN+		at Bowling Green	W 86–81	13–11 (7–4)	17 – Mitchell	5 – Tied	4 – Tied	Stroh Center (1,912); Bowling Green, OH
February 14, 2025; 7:00 p.m., ESPN+		at Kent State	L 75–76	13–12 (7–5)	25 – Mitchell	6 – Tied	5 – Tied	MAC Center (2,113); Kent, OH
February 18, 2025; 7:00 p.m., ESPN+		Central Michigan	W 84–82	14–12 (8–5)	22 – Paveletzke	8 – Mitchell	6 – Mitchell	Convocation Center (4,387); Athens, OH
February 22, 2025; 6:00 p.m., ESPN2		Akron	W 84–67	15–12 (9–5)	21 – Paveletzke	8 – Clayton	4 – Elliot	Convocation Center (6,740); Athens, OH
February 25, 2025; 7:00 p.m., ESPN+		at Western Michigan	L 73–82	15–13 (9–6)	21 – Mitchell	6 – Brown	5 – Paveletzke	University Arena (1,849); Kalamazoo, MI
March 1, 2025; 1:00 p.m., ESPN+		Miami (OH)	W 75–66	16–13 (10–6)	20 – Clayton	7 – Searles	5 – Paveletzke	Convocation Center (7,891); Athens, OH
March 4, 2025; 7:00 p.m., ESPN+		Eastern Michigan	L 79–83	16–14 (10–7)	20 – Paveletzke	6 – Clayton	5 – Paveletzke	Convocation Center (4,450); Athens, OH
March 7, 2025; 7:00 p.m., ESPN+		at Toledo	L 82–96	16–15 (10–8)	20 – James	8 – Elliott	4 – Elliott	Savage Arena (5,397); Toledo, OH
MAC tournament
March 13, 2024†; 1:30 p.m., ESPN+	(5)	vs. (4) Toledo; Quarterfinals	L 85–90	16–16	28 – Paveletzke	8 – Hadaway	3 – Paveletzke	Rocket Arena; Cleveland, OH
*Non-conference game. ^{#}Rankings from AP poll. (#) Tournament seedings in parentheses. All times are in Eastern.

== Statistics ==
=== Team Statistics ===
Final 2024–25 Statistics

Record	Ohio	OPP
Scoring	2554	2449
Scoring Average	79.81	76.53
Field goals – Att	899–1915	872–1909
3-pt. Field goals – Att	275–769	232–625
Free throws – Att	481–632	473–672
Rebounds	1062	1146
Assists	450	416
Turnovers	348	412
Steals	231	214
Blocked Shots	95	98

=== Player statistics ===
			Minutes		Scoring		Total FGs			3-point FGs			Free-Throws			Rebounds								
Player	GP	GS	Tot	Avg	Pts	Avg	FG	FGA	Pct	3FG	3FA	Pct	FT	FTA	Pct	Off	Def	Tot	Avg	A	PF	TO	Stl	Blk
Jackson Paveletzke	32	32	1034	32.3	443	13.8	162	315	0.514	20	62	0.323	99	129	0.767	21	110	131	4.1	152	43	86	27	1
AJ Clayton	29	29	823	28.4	407	14.0	141	294	0.480	66	176	0.375	59	75	0.787	34	119	153	5.3	30	52	33	17	44
AJ Brown	29	29	774	26.7	382	13.2	123	261	0.471	54	139	0.388	82	100	0.820	31	62	93	3.2	32	70	36	37	2
Shereef Mitchell	25	18	712	28.5	329	13.2	112	254	0.441	33	82	0.402	72	87	0.828	13	68	81	3.2	62	75	41	44	3
Elmore James	30	17	767	25.6	245	8.2	82	210	0.390	38	102	0.373	43	51	0.843	22	57	79	2.6	26	61	31	24	5
Vic Searls	32	4	589	18.4	226	7.1	93	152	0.612	4	16	0.250	36	53	0.679	35	90	125	3.9	25	70	44	14	11
Aidan Hadaway	18	17	485	26.9	183	10.2	68	136	0.500	16	48	0.333	31	43	0.721	30	75	105	5.8	28	52	17	19	14
Elijah Elliott	30	14	494	16.5	152	5.1	54	123	0.439	11	28	0.393	33	54	0.611	13	83	96	3.2	43	47	25	12	7
Ajay Sheldon	32	0	620	19.4	151	4.7	52	141	0.369	29	102	0.284	18	25	0.720	3	46	49	1.5	42	69	13	34	3
Ayden Evans	16	0	97	6.1	19	1.2	7	15	0.467	0	3	0.000	5	11	0.455	2	12	14	0.9	1	16	9	1	5
Ben Nicol	7	0	29	4.1	10	1.4	3	9	0.333	2	7	0.286	2	2	1.000	0	0	0	0.0	7	3	1	2	0
Ben Estis	7	0	27	3.9	7	1.0	2	5	0.400	2	4	0.500	1	2	0.500	1	1	2	0.3	2	1	2	0	0
Total	32	-	6451	-	2554	79.8	899	1915	0.469	275	769	0.358	481	632	0.761	205	723	928	29.0	450	559	348	231	95
Opponents	32	-	6451	-	2449	76.5	872	1909	0.457	232	625	0.371	473	672	0.704	323	823	1146	35.8	416	587	412	214	98

Legend
GP	Games played	GS	Games started	Avg	Average per game
FG	Field-goals made	FGA	Field-goal attempts	Off	Offensive rebounds
Def	Defensive rebounds	A	Assists	TO	Turnovers
Blk	Blocks	Stl	Steals	High	Team high

== Awards and honors ==
=== Weekly Awards ===
Weekly Award Honors
Honors	Player	Position	Date Awarded	Source
MAC player of the week	AJ Clayton	F	November 24	
MAC player of the week	AJ Clayton	F	January 13	
Lou Henson National Player of the Week	AJ Clayton	F	January 13	

=== All-MAC Awards ===
Postseason All-MAC teams
Team	Player	Position	Year
All-MAC 3rd Team	AJ Clayton	F	Sr.
All-MAC Honorable Mention	Shereef Mitchell	G	GS
All-MAC Defensive Team	Shereef Mitchell	G	GS
All-MAC Freshman Team	Elijah Elliot	G	Fr.
