= 2024–25 Miami RedHawks men's basketball team =

American college basketball season

2024–25 Miami RedHawks men's basketball

Fort Myers Tip-Off Palms Division champions
- Conference: Mid-American Conference
- Record: 25–9 (14–4 MAC)
- Head coach: Travis Steele (3rd season)
- Associate head coach: Jonathan Holmes (3rd season)
- Assistant coaches: Khristian Smith (3rd season); Carl Richburg (1st season); Elijah Pennington (1st season)
- Home arena: Millett Hall

2024–25 Mid-American Conference men's basketball standings
	Conf.				Overall
Team	W		L	PCT	W		L	PCT
Akron †	17	–	1	.944	28	–	7	.800
Miami (OH)	14	–	4	.778	25	–	9	.735
Kent State	11	–	7	.611	24	–	12	.667
Toledo	10	–	8	.556	18	–	15	.545
Ohio	10	–	8	.556	16	–	16	.500
Western Michigan	9	–	9	.500	12	–	20	.375
Eastern Michigan	9	–	9	.500	16	–	16	.500
Bowling Green	8	–	10	.444	14	–	18	.438
Ball State	7	–	11	.389	14	–	17	.452
Central Michigan	7	–	11	.389	14	–	17	.452
Buffalo	4	–	14	.222	9	–	22	.290
Northern Illinois	2	–	16	.111	6	–	25	.194
† 2025 MAC tournament winner

The 2024–25 Miami RedHawks men's basketball team represented Miami University during the 2024–25 NCAA Division I men's basketball season. The RedHawks, led by third-year head coach Travis Steele, played their home games at Millett Hall in Oxford, Ohio as members of the Mid-American Conference.

== Previous season ==
The RedHawks finished the 2023–24 season 15–16, 9–9 in MAC play to finish tied for sixth place. They were defeated by eventual tournament champions Akron in the championship game of the MAC tournament. Previously the school record for single regular season wins had been 23. 25 overall wins established a school record. Miami had not had a 20-win season since the 24–8 1998–99 Miami RedHawks men's basketball team. Miami had not even had a winning conference record since the 2010–11 Miami RedHawks men's basketball team. The team also set a record with 15 consecutive single-season home wins. They were the first team to reach the Mid-American Conference men's basketball tournament championship game since the 2006–07 Miami RedHawks men's basketball team won the 2007 MAC men's basketball tournament.

== Offseason ==
=== Departures ===
Departures
Name	Number	Pos.	Height	Weight	Year	Hometown	Reason for departure
Bradley Dean	1	G	6'2"	170	Junior	Gate City, Virginia	Transferred to UVA Wise
Julian Lewis	3	G/F	6'6"	200	Junior	Ann Arbor, Michigan	Transferred to Eastern Michigan
Darweshi Hunter	4	G/F	6'5"	200	Graduate student	Phoenix, Arizona	Graduated
Ryan Mabrey	13	G	6'5"	195	Sophomore	Belmar, New Jersey	Transferred to Quinnipiac
Hampton Dauparas	14	F	6'5"	225	Freshman	Long Beach, Indiana	Walk-on; didn't return
Jaquel Morris	21	C	6'8"	220	Sophomore	Brooklyn, New York	Transferred to Saint Peter's
Bryce Bultman	25	F	6'5"	200	Graduate student	Nashville, Illinois	Graduated
Anderson Mirambeaux	45	C	6'8"	305	Senior	Santo Domingo, Dominican Republic	Graduated

=== Incoming transfers ===
Incoming transfers
Name	Number	Pos.	Height	Weight	Year	Hometown	Previous school
Kam Craft	4	G/F	6'6"	205	RS Sophomore	Chicago, Illinois	Xavier
Peter Suder	5	G	6'5"	215	Junior	Carmel, Indiana	Bellarmine
Antwone Woolfolk	13	F	6'9"	235	Junior	Cleveland, Ohio	Rutgers
Dan Luers	25	G	6'5"	220	Graduate student	Lebanon, Ohio	Eastern Illinois

=== Recruiting class ===
College recruiting information
Name	Hometown	School	Height	Weight	Commit date
Luke Skaljac; G	Broadview Heights, Ohio	Broadview Heights High School	6 ft 2 in (1.88 m)	180 lb (82 kg)	
Luke Skaljac; G	Recruit ratings: Rivals: 247Sports: ESPN: (N/A)				
Jack Sauer; G	Loveland, Ohio	Loveland High School	6 ft 2 in (1.88 m)	180 lb (82 kg)	
Jack Sauer; G	Recruit ratings: Rivals: 247Sports: ESPN: (N/A)				
Overall recruit ranking:
Note: In many cases, Scout, Rivals, 247Sports, On3, and ESPN may conflict in their listings of height and weight.; In these cases, the average was taken. ESPN grades are on a 100-point scale.; Sources: "2024 Team Ranking". Rivals.

== Preseason ==
On October 22, 2024 the MAC released the preseason coaches poll. Miami was picked to finish sixth in the MAC regular season.

=== Preseason rankings ===
MAC preseason poll
Predicted finish	Team	Votes (1st place)
1	Ohio	121 (11)
2	Akron	106 (1)
3	Kent State	99
4	Toledo	95
5	Bowling Green	73
6	Miami (OH)	72
7	Ball State	67
8	Central Michigan	55
9	Eastern Michigan	36
10	Western Michigan	33
11	Northern Illinois	24
12	Buffalo	11

MAC Tournament Champions: Ohio (8), Kent State (3), Toledo (1)

=== Preseason All-MAC ===
No RedHawks were named to the first or second Preseason All-MAC teams.

== Roster ==
2024–25 Miami RedHawks men's basketball team
Players
Coaches

Pos.	#	Name	Height	Weight	Year	Previous school	Hometown
G/F	0	Eian Elmer	6 ft 6 in (1.98 m)	205 lb (93 kg)	So	Robert A. Taft Information Technology High School	Cincinnati, Ohio
G	2	Evan Ipsaro	6 ft 0 in (1.83 m)	200 lb (91 kg)	So	Covington Catholic High School	Crestview Hills, Kentucky
G	3	Luke Skaljac	6 ft 2 in (1.88 m)	180 lb (82 kg)	Fr	Broadview Heights High School	Broadview Heights, Ohio
G/F	4	Kam Craft	6 ft 6 in (1.98 m)	205 lb (93 kg)	RS So	Xavier	Chicago, Illinois
G	5	Peter Suder	6 ft 5 in (1.96 m)	215 lb (98 kg)	Jr	Bellarmine	Carmel, Indiana
G	6	Jack Sauer	6 ft 2 in (1.88 m)	180 lb (82 kg)	Fr	Loveland High School	Loveland, Ohio
G	8	Eli Yofan	6 ft 2 in (1.88 m)	205 lb (93 kg)	Jr	Fox Chapel Area High School	Pittsburgh, Pennsylvania
G	11	Mekhi Cooper	6 ft 1 in (1.85 m)	165 lb (75 kg)	So	Bolingbrook High School	Bolingbrook, Illinois
F	13	Antwone Woolfolk	6 ft 9 in (2.06 m)	235 lb (107 kg)	Jr	Rutgers	Cleveland, Ohio
G/F	22	Brant Byers	6 ft 8 in (2.03 m)	195 lb (88 kg)	RS Fr	Perkiomen School	Chambersburg, Pennsylvania
F	24	Jackson Kotecki	6 ft 9 in (2.06 m)	225 lb (102 kg)	So	St. Ignatius College Prep	Chicago, Illinois
G	25	Dan Luers	6 ft 5 in (1.96 m)	220 lb (100 kg)	GS	Eastern Illinois	Lebanon, Ohio
F	29	Ethan Wright	6 ft 4 in (1.93 m)	162 lb (73 kg)	So	Spring Valley Academy	Philadelphia, Pennsylvania
G	33	Blake Anderson	6 ft 3 in (1.91 m)	200 lb (91 kg)	So	Evansville Memorial High School	Evansville, Indiana
C	35	Reece Potter	7 ft 1 in (2.16 m)	215 lb (98 kg)	So	Lexington Catholic High School	Lexington, Kentucky

Head coach

- Travis Steele (Butler)

Assistant coach(es)

- Jonathan Holmes (North Carolina)
- Khristian Smith (Indiana State)
- Carl Richburg (Miami (OH))
- Elijah Pennington (IUPUI)

Legend

- (C) Team captain
- (S) Suspended
- (I) Ineligible
- (W) Walk-on
- Injured
- Current redshirt

Roster
Last update: November 13, 2024

== Schedule and results ==
Date time, TV	Rank^{#}	Opponent^{#}	Result	Record	High points	High rebounds	High assists	Site (attendance) city, state
Non-conference regular season
November 4, 2024*; 6:30 pm, ESPN+		at Appalachian State; MAC-SBC Challenge	W 77–63	1–0	17 – Suder	6 – Tied	4 – Cooper	Holmes Center (3,193); Boone, NC
November 9, 2024*; 1:00 pm, ESPN+		Wright State	L 68–81	1–1	23 – Craft	10 – Woolfolk	4 – Suder	Millett Hall (2,078); Oxford, OH
November 12, 2024*; 7:00 pm, ESPN+		Maryland Eastern Shore	W 88–70	2–1	24 – Elmer	9 – Elmer	5 – Cooper	Millett Hall (1,611); Oxford, OH
November 18, 2024*; 6:00 pm, BTN		at Michigan; Fort Myers Tip-Off campus game	L 67–94	2–2	14 – Elmer	5 – Byers	4 – Suder	Crisler Center (9,943); Ann Arbor, MI
November 25, 2024*; 11:00 am, PTB Live		vs. Siena; Fort Myers Tip-Off Palms Division semifinals	W 70–58	3–2	18 – Tied	9 – Woolfolk	4 – Cooper	Suncoast Credit Union Arena; Fort Myers, FL
November 26, 2024*; 1:30 pm, PTB Live		vs. Mercer; Fort Myers Tip-Off Palms Division championship	W 75–72	4–2	16 – Suder	6 – Tied	3 – Suder	Suncoast Credit Union Arena (610); Fort Myers, FL
December 2, 2024*; 7:00 pm, ESPN+		Air Force	W 73–60	5–2	42 – Suder	7 – Elmer	6 – Cooper	Millett Hall (1,637); Oxford, OH
December 6, 2024*; 7:00 pm, BTN		at Indiana	L 57–76	5–3	14 – Skaljac	4 – Tied	4 – Skaljac	Simon Skjodt Assembly Hall (17,222); Bloomington, IN
December 15, 2024*; 1:00 pm, ESPN+		Bethany (WV)	W 112–70	6–3	34 – Craft	8 – Woolfolk	9 – Suder	Millett Hall (1,003); Oxford, OH
December 18, 2024*; 7:00 pm, ESPN+		at Vermont	L 67–75	6–4	21 – Suder	7 – Woolfolk	2 – Suder	Patrick Gym (2,065); Burlington, VT
December 22, 2024*; 1:00 pm, ESPN+		Sacred Heart	W 94–76	7–4	19 – Potter	7 – Byers	6 – Suder	Millett Hall (896); Oxford, OH
December 30, 2024*; 7:00 pm, ESPN+		Defiance	W 141–58	8–4	20 – Luers	8 – Potter	7 – Ipsaro	Millett Hall (1,170); Oxford, OH
MAC regular season
January 4, 2025; 1:00 pm, ESPN+		Buffalo	W 93–79	9–4 (1–0)	20 – Craft	10 – Suder	5 – Tied	Millett Hall (1,047); Oxford, OH
January 7, 2025; 7:00 pm, ESPN+		at Ball State	W 80–72	10–4 (2–0)	28 – Craft	6 – Elmer	5 – Potter	Worthen Arena (3,512); Muncie, IN
January 11, 2025; 3:30 pm, ESPN+		Western Michigan	W 91–71	11–4 (3–0)	23 – Craft	8 – Woolfolk	5 – Suder	Millett Hall (1,002); Oxford, OH
January 14, 2025; 6:00 pm, ESPN+		at Northern Illinois	W 84–69	12–4 (4–0)	17 – Byers	8 – Woolfolk	3 – Cooper	Convocation Center (1,244); DeKalb, IL
January 18, 2025; 3:30 pm, ESPN+		at Kent State	W 70–61	13–4 (5–0)	15 – Byers	9 – Suder	5 – Suder	MAC Center (3,054); Kent, OH
January 21, 2025; 7:00 pm, ESPN+		Bowling Green	W 84–76	14–4 (6–0)	14 – Cooper	7 – Woolfolk	2 – Tied	Millett Hall (1,175); Oxford, OH
January 25, 2025; 2:00 pm, ESPN+		at Akron	L 75–102	14–5 (6–1)	18 – Suder	4 – Tied	3 – Tied	James A. Rhodes Arena (2,834); Akron, OH
January 28, 2025; 7:00 pm, ESPN+		Eastern Michigan	W 89–80	15–5 (7–1)	21 – Woolfolk	10 – Woolfolk	4 – Potter	Millett Hall (2,080); Oxford, OH
February 1, 2025; 3:30 pm, ESPN+		Ohio	W 73–69	16–5 (8–1)	15 – Suder	9 – Woolfolk	4 – Ipsaro	Millett Hall (7,889); Oxford, OH
February 4, 2025; 7:00 pm, ESPN+		at Central Michigan	W 76–70	17–5 (9–1)	21 – Suder	9 – Elmer	4 – Tied	McGuirk Arena (1,203); Mount Pleasant, MI
February 8, 2025*; 1:00 pm, ESPN+		Troy; MAC-SBC Challenge	W 69–62	18–5	15 – Ipsaro	8 – Tied	6 – Suder	Millett Hall (1,817); Oxford, OH
February 11, 2025; 7:00 pm, ESPN+		Toledo	W 92–80	19–5 (10–1)	40 – Craft	14 – Elmer	7 – Suder	Millett Hall (2,661); Oxford, OH
February 15, 2025; 2:30 pm, ESPN+		at Western Michigan	L 70–78	19–6 (10–2)	19 – Byers	7 – Suder	5 – Suder	University Arena (1,639); Kalamazoo, MI
February 18, 2025; 6:30 pm, ESPN+		at Eastern Michigan	L 66–76	19–7 (10–3)	19 – Elmer	5 – Craft	5 – Ipsaro	George Gervin GameAbove Center (1,294); Ypsilanti, MI
February 21, 2025; 8:00 pm, CBSSN		Kent State	W 96–92 ^{OT}	20–7 (11–3)	22 – Suder	6 – Potter	6 – Tied	Millett Hall (6,339); Oxford, OH
February 25, 2025; 7:00 pm, ESPN+		Northern Illinois	W 87–58	21–7 (12–3)	22 – Tied	7 – Suder	6 – Skaljac	Millett Hall (2,197); Oxford, OH
March 1, 2025; 1:00 pm, ESPN+		at Ohio	L 66–75	21–8 (12–4)	16 – Woolfolk	9 – Suder	5 – Tied	Convocation Center (7,891); Athens, OH
March 4, 2025; 7:00 pm, ESPN+		at Buffalo	W 84–69	22–8 (13–4)	15 – Suder	5 – Suder	9 – Suder	Alumni Arena (1,166); Amherst, NY
March 7, 2025; 6:00 pm, ESPNU		Ball State	W 79–66	23–8 (14–4)	19 – Craft	9 – Elmer	6 – Ipsaro	Millett Hall (7,893); Oxford, OH
MAC tournament
March 13, 2025; 4:30 pm, ESPN+	(2)	vs. (7) Eastern Michigan; Quarterfinals	W 81–75	24–8	24 – Craft	10 – Suder	10 – Suder	Rocket Mortgage FieldHouse; Cleveland, OH
March 14, 2025; 7:30 pm, CBSSN	(2)	vs. (3) Kent State; Semifinals	W 72–64	25–8	23 – Suder	11 – Suder	4 – Suder	Rocket Mortgage FieldHouse (7,738); Cleveland, OH
March 15, 2025; 7:30 pm, ESPN2	(2)	vs. (1) Akron; Championship	L 74–76	25–9	24 – Suder	5 – Craft	6 – Ipsaro	Rocket Mortgage FieldHouse (7,099); Cleveland, OH
*Non-conference game. ^{#}Rankings from AP Poll. (#) Tournament seedings in parentheses. All times are in Eastern.
