= 2024–25 Louisiana Ragin' Cajuns men's basketball team =

American college basketball season

2024–25 Louisiana Ragin' Cajuns men's basketball
- Conference: Sun Belt Conference
- Record: 12–21 (8–10 Sun Belt)
- Head coach: Bob Marlin (15th season; first 12 games); Derrick Zimmerman (interim, rest of season)
- Assistant coaches: Casey Perrin; Neil Hardin; Phillip Shumpert
- Home arena: Cajundome

2024–25 Sun Belt Conference men's basketball standings
| | Conf. | | | | Overall |
| Team | W | | L | PCT | W | | L | PCT |
|---|---|---|---|---|---|---|---|---|
| South Alabama | 13 | – | 5 | .722 | 21 | – | 11 | .656 |
| James Madison | 13 | – | 5 | .722 | 20 | – | 12 | .625 |
| Troy † | 13 | – | 5 | .722 | 23 | – | 11 | .676 |
| Arkansas State | 13 | – | 5 | .722 | 25 | – | 11 | .694 |
| Marshall | 12 | – | 6 | .667 | 20 | – | 13 | .606 |
| Appalachian State | 10 | – | 8 | .556 | 17 | – | 14 | .548 |
| Texas State | 9 | – | 9 | .500 | 16 | – | 16 | .500 |
| Georgia State | 8 | – | 10 | .444 | 14 | – | 19 | .424 |
| Georgia Southern | 8 | – | 10 | .444 | 17 | – | 16 | .515 |
| Old Dominion | 8 | – | 10 | .444 | 15 | – | 20 | .429 |
| Louisiana | 8 | – | 10 | .444 | 12 | – | 21 | .364 |
| Southern Miss | 5 | – | 13 | .278 | 11 | – | 22 | .333 |
| Coastal Carolina | 3 | – | 15 | .167 | 10 | – | 22 | .313 |
| Louisiana–Monroe | 3 | – | 15 | .167 | 7 | – | 25 | .219 |
† 2025 Sun Belt tournament winner

The 2024–25 Louisiana Ragin' Cajuns men's basketball team represented the University of Louisiana at Lafayette during the 2024–25 NCAA Division I men's basketball season. The Ragin' Cajuns, led by 15th-year head coach Bob Marlin, played their home games at the Cajundome as members of the Sun Belt Conference. Marlin was relieved from his coaching duties after the twelfth game of the season. He finished his career at Louisiana with an overall record of 269–198, with two NCAA tournament appearances. Assistant coach Derrick Zimmerman was appointed interim head coach.

== Previous season ==
The Ragin' Cajuns finished the 2023–24 season 18–13, 10–8 in Sun Belt play to finish in fifth place. As the No. 5 seed in the Sun Belt tournament, they defeated Coastal Carolina in the second round before losing to Arkansas State in the quarterfinals.

== Preseason ==
=== Preseason Sun Belt Conference poll ===
The Ragin' Cajuns were picked to finish in fourth place in the conference's preseason poll. Senior forward Hosana Kitenge was named to the conference preseason first team.

Coaches poll
| Predicted finish | Team (1st place Votes) |
| 1 | Arkansas State - 193 (12) |
| 2 | James Madison - 170 (1) |
| 3 | Troy - 155 (1) |
| 4 | Louisiana - 144 |
| 5 | Southern Miss - 133 |
| 6 | App State - 122 |
| 7 | Texas State – 89 |
| T8 | Georgia Southern - 85 |
| T8 | Old Dominion - 85 |
| 10 | Marshall - 79 |
| 11 | South Alabama - 78 |
| 12 | Georgia State - 75 |
| 13 | Coastal Carolina - 34 |
| 14 | ULM - 28 |

== Roster ==
2024–25 Louisiana Ragin' Cajuns men's basketball team
Players
Coaches

| Pos. | # | Name | Height | Weight | Year | Previous school | Hometown |
|---|---|---|---|---|---|---|---|
| F | 0 | Jeremiah Evans | 6 ft 10 in (2.08 m) | 210 lb (95 kg) | Fr | Southwood HS | Shreveport, LA |
| G | 1 | Brandon Hardy | 6 ft 3 in (1.91 m) | 190 lb (86 kg) | So | Zachary HS | Zachary, LA |
| G | 2 | Kentrell Garnett | 6 ft 1 in (1.85 m) | 165 lb (75 kg) | Sr | Catholic HS | Donaldsonville, LA |
| G | 3 | Chancellor White | 6 ft 6 in (1.98 m) | 185 lb (84 kg) | RS So | Foster HS | Richmond, TX |
| G/F | 4 | Kyndall Davis | 6 ft 5 in (1.96 m) | 200 lb (91 kg) | Sr | Bogan HS; Eastern Illinois | Chicago, IL |
| G | 5 | London Fields | 6 ft 4 in (1.93 m) | 185 lb (84 kg) | So | Tupelo HS | Tupelo, MS |
| G | 7 | Christian Landry | 6 ft 5 in (1.96 m) | 190 lb (86 kg) | RS So | St. Thomas More HS | Lafayette, LA |
| G | 8 | Mostapha El Moutaouakkil | 6 ft 6 in (1.98 m) | 195 lb (88 kg) | Jr | Eaglecrest HS; Indian River State | Rabat, Morocco |
| G | 9 | Isaiah Crawford | 6 ft 3 in (1.91 m) | 175 lb (79 kg) | RS So | Archbishop Shaw HS | New Orleans, LA |
| F | 10 | Zeke Cook | 6 ft 6 in (1.98 m) | 220 lb (100 kg) | Sr | Starkville HS; Jackson State | Pheba, MS |
| G | 11 | Koron Davis | 6 ft 7 in (2.01 m) | 185 lb (84 kg) | Jr | Bowman Academy; Louisville | Gary, IN |
| G | 12 | Michael Mouton | 6 ft 4 in (1.93 m) | 195 lb (88 kg) | Fr | St. Thomas More HS | Lafayette, LA |
| G | 13 | Christian Wright | 6 ft 3 in (1.91 m) | 185 lb (84 kg) | Sr | The Skill Factory; Oregon State | Alpharetta, GA |
| F | 23 | Kyran Ratliff | 6 ft 8 in (2.03 m) | 205 lb (93 kg) | RS So | Booker T. Washington HS; Shaun Dumas Academy | New Orleans, LA |
| F | 34 | Hosana Kitenge | 6 ft 8 in (2.03 m) | 270 lb (122 kg) | Sr | Charnwood College; Three Rivers CC | Crawley, England |
| G | 52 | Michael Thomas | 6 ft 1 in (1.85 m) | 160 lb (73 kg) | Sr | Hamilton Christian | Lake Charles, LA |

Head coach

- Derrick Zimmerman (Mississippi State)

Assistant coach(es)

- Casey Perrin (Campbell)
- Neil Hardin (West Florida)
- Phillip Shumpert (US Sports Academy)

Legend

- (C) Team captain
- (S) Suspended
- (I) Ineligible
- (W) Walk-on
- Injured
- Current redshirt

Roster
Last update: December 19, 2024

== Schedule and results ==
| Date time, TV | Rank^{#} | Opponent^{#} | Result | Record | High points | High rebounds | High assists | Site (attendance) city, state |
Exhibition
| October 30, 2024*; 7:30 p.m. | | Louisiana Christian | W 91–67 | | 17 – Tied | 11 – Evans | 2 – Tied | Cajundome (1,392); Lafayette, LA |
Regular season
| November 4, 2024*; 7:00 p.m., ESPN+ | | Kent State; MAC–SBC Challenge | L 66–70 | 0–1 | 14 – Garnett | 8 – Cook | 6 – Thomas | Cajundome (1,412); Lafayette, LA |
| November 7, 2024*; 7:00 p.m., ESPN+ | | UT Dallas | W 82–65 | 1–1 | 24 – Ko. Davis | 9 – Cook | 4 – Ky. Davis | Cajundome (1,233); Lafayette, LA |
| November 13, 2024*; 7:00 p.m., ESPN+ | | at No. 8 Houston | L 45–91 | 1–2 | 8 – Wright | 4 – Tied | 3 – Wright | Fertitta Center (7,035); Houston, TX |
| November 19, 2024*; 7:30 p.m., ESPN+ | | Rice | L 61–83 | 1–3 | 17 – Thomas | 5 – Tied | 6 – Garnett | Cajundome (1,328); Lafayette, LA |
| November 22, 2024*; 4:30 p.m., ESPN+ | | vs. Liberty; U. S. Virgin Islands Paradise Jam; Quarterfinal | L 69–89 | 1–4 | 21 – Wright | 4 – Ratliff | 4 – Ky. Davis | Elridge Wilburn Blake; Sports and Fitness Center (2,125); Saint Thomas, USVI |
| November 23, 2024*; 4:30 p.m., ESPN+ | | vs. George Washington; U. S. Virgin Islands Paradise Jam; Consolation Semifinal | L 74–83 | 1–5 | 19 – El Moutaouakkil | 7 – El Moutaouakkil | 3 – Tied | Elridge Wilburn Blake; Sports and Fitness Center (1,886); Saint Thomas, USVI |
| November 25, 2024*; 11:30 a.m., ESPN+ | | vs. UAB; U. S. Virgin Islands Paradise Jam; Seventh Place | L 86–98 | 1–6 | 19 – El Moutaouakkil | 7 – Ky. Davis | 6 – Wright | Elridge Wilburn Blake; Sports and Fitness Center (1,986); Saint Thomas, USVI |
| November 30, 2024*; 2:00 p.m., ESPN+ | | Nicholls | L 75–76 | 1–7 | 25 – Ratliff | 13 – Ratliff | 3 – El Moutaouakkil | Cajundome (1,296); Lafayette, LA |
| December 8, 2024*; 3:30 p.m., ESPN+ | | Louisiana Tech | L 58–69 | 1–8 | 23 – Garnett | 7 – Ky. Davis | 3 – Wright | Cajundome (1,187); Lafayette, LA |
| December 11, 2024*; 7:00 p.m., ESPN+ | | Southeastern Louisiana | W 68–61 | 2–8 | 15 – Ky. Davis | 5 – Tied | 5 – Thomas | Cajundome (1,165); Lafayette, LA |
| December 14, 2024*; 12:00 p.m., ESPN+ | | Lamar | L 45–74 | 2–9 | 11 – Ky. Davis | 5 – Evans | 3 – Thomas | Cajundome (1,113); Lafayette, LA |
| December 18, 2024; 7:00 p.m., ESPN+ | | Appalachian State | W 68–62 | 3–9 (1–0) | 15 – El Moutaouakkil | 10 – Ratliff | 3 – Tied | Cajundome (1,391); Lafayette, LA |
| December 22, 2024*; 2:00 p.m., ESPN+ | | McNeese | L 56–64 | 3–10 | 14 – El Moutaouakkil | 8 – El Moutaouakkil | 3 – Thomas | Cajundome (2,407); Lafayette, LA |
| January 2, 2025; 6:00 p.m., ESPN+ | | at Coastal Carolina | W 71–68 | 4–10 (2–0) | 21 – El Moutaouakkil | 7 – El Moutaouakkil | 4 – Thomas | HTC Center (1,402); Conway, SC |
| January 4, 2025; 6:00 p.m., ESPN+ | | at Georgia State | L 70–94 | 4–11 (2–1) | 17 – El Moutaouakkil | 9 – El Moutaouakkil | 3 – Tied | GSU Convocation Center (1,508); Atlanta, GA |
| January 9, 2025; 7:00 p.m., ESPN+ | | Old Dominion | L 60–71 | 4–12 (2–2) | 19 – Evans | 7 – Tied | 5 – Thomas | Cajundome (1,235); Lafayette, LA |
| January 11, 2025; 7:00 p.m., ESPN+ | | Louisiana–Monroe | W 71–68 | 5–12 (3–2) | 15 – Garnett | 5 – Tied | 5 – Garnett | Cajundome (2,005); Lafayette, LA |
| January 16, 2025; 7:00 p.m., ESPN+ | | at Arkansas State | L 63–83 | 5–13 (3–3) | 18 – El Moutaouakkil | 8 – El Moutaouakkil | 3 – Wright | First National Bank Arena (5,248); Jonesboro, AR |
| January 18, 2025; 3:00 p.m., ESPN+ | | at Louisiana–Monroe | W 65–60 | 6–13 (4–3) | 18 – Garnett | 9 – El Moutaouakkil | 3 – Tied | Fant–Ewing Coliseum (1,514); Monroe, LA |
| January 23, 2025; 3:00 p.m., ESPN+ | | Texas State | L 74–89 | 6–14 (4–4) | 15 – Hardy | 4 – Davis | 3 – Garnett | Cajundome (867); Lafayette, LA |
| January 25, 2025; 7:00 p.m., ESPN+ | | Southern Miss | L 59–67 | 6–15 (4–5) | 23 – El Moutaouakkil | 10 – Ratliff | 3 – Tied | Cajundome (1,996); Lafayette, LA |
| January 30, 2025; 7:00 p.m., ESPN+ | | at Texas State | W 70–61 | 7–15 (5–5) | 15 – Garnett | 6 – Davis | 3 – Tied | Strahan Arena (1,709); San Marcos, TX |
| February 1, 2025; 7:00 p.m., ESPN+ | | South Alabama | L 58–62 ^{OT} | 7–16 (5–6) | 17 – El Moutaouakkil | 11 – El Moutaouakkil | 5 – Garnett | Cajundome (2,112); Lafayette, LA |
| February 5, 2025; 6:00 p.m., ESPN+ | | at Georgia Southern | L 82–83 | 7–17 (5–7) | 24 – El Moutaouakkil | 7 – El Moutaouakkil | 5 – Wright | Hill Convocation Center (1,756); Statesboro, GA |
| February 8, 2025*; 1:00 p.m., ESPN+ | | at Northern Illinois; MAC–SBC Challenge | W 66–64 | 8–17 | 12 – Garnett | 6 – Cook | 3 – Tied | Convocation Center (1,278); DeKalb, IL |
| February 12, 2025; 7:30 p.m., ESPN+ | | Troy | L 56–74 | 8–18 (5–8) | 19 – El Moutaouakkil | 4 – Cook | 2 – Hardy | Cajundome (1,128); Lafayette, LA |
| February 15, 2025; 7:00 p.m., ESPN+ | | Marshall | W 79–68 | 9–18 (6–8) | 23 – El Moutaouakkil | 8 – El Moutaouakkil | 2 – El Moutaouakkil | Cajundome (1,484); Lafayette, LA |
| February 20, 2025; 6:00 p.m., ESPN+ | | at Troy | W 72–69 | 10–18 (7–8) | 25 – El Moutaouakkil | 11 – Cook | 3 – Garnett | Trojan Arena (3,978); Troy, AL |
| February 22, 2025; 7:00 p.m., ESPN+ | | at Southern Miss | W 62–60 | 11–18 (8–8) | 10 – El Moutaouakkil | 5 – Cook | 4 – Wright | Reed Green Coliseum (3,738); Hattiesburg, MS |
| February 26, 2025; 7:30 p.m., ESPN+ | | Arkansas State | L 64–83 | 11–19 (8–9) | 15 – El Moutaouakkil | 6 – Garnett | 3 – Thomas | Cajundome (1,635); Lafayette, LA |
| February 28, 2025; 7:00 p.m., ESPN+ | | at South Alabama | L 42–65 | 11–20 (8–10) | 9 – Tied | 7 – Evans | 3 – Tied | Mitchell Center (1,500); Mobile, AL |
Sun Belt tournament
| March 4, 2025; 7:30 p.m., ESPN+ | (11) | vs. (14) Louisiana–Monroe; First round | W 73–69 ^{OT} | 12–20 | 28 – El Moutaouakkil | 9 – Cook | 5 – Wright | Pensacola Bay Center (868); Pensacola, FL |
| March 5, 2025; 7:30 p.m., ESPN+ | (11) | vs. (10) Old Dominion; Second round | L 49–67 | 12–21 | 22 – El Moutaouakkil | 6 – Thomas | 1 – Tied | Pensacola Bay Center (838); Pensacola, FL |
*Non-conference game. ^{#}Rankings from AP Poll. (#) Tournament seedings in parentheses. E=East. All times are in Central Time.
