= 2024–25 Kent State Golden Flashes men's basketball team =

American college basketball season

2024–25 Kent State Golden Flashes men's basketball

NIT, Quarterfinals
- Conference: Mid-American Conference
- Record: 24–12 (11–7 MAC)
- Head coach: Rob Senderoff (14th season)
- Assistant coaches: Randal Holt (4th season); Jon Fleming (3rd season); Jalen Avery (1st season); Luke Trondson (1st season); Tommy Luce (1st season)
- Home arena: MAC Center

2024–25 Mid-American Conference men's basketball standings
	Conf.				Overall
Team	W		L	PCT	W		L	PCT
Akron †	17	–	1	.944	28	–	7	.800
Miami (OH)	14	–	4	.778	25	–	9	.735
Kent State	11	–	7	.611	24	–	12	.667
Toledo	10	–	8	.556	18	–	15	.545
Ohio	10	–	8	.556	16	–	16	.500
Western Michigan	9	–	9	.500	12	–	20	.375
Eastern Michigan	9	–	9	.500	16	–	16	.500
Bowling Green	8	–	10	.444	14	–	18	.438
Ball State	7	–	11	.389	14	–	17	.452
Central Michigan	7	–	11	.389	14	–	17	.452
Buffalo	4	–	14	.222	9	–	22	.290
Northern Illinois	2	–	16	.111	6	–	25	.194
† 2025 MAC tournament winner

The 2024–25 Kent State Golden Flashes men's basketball team represented Kent State University during the 2024–25 NCAA Division I men's basketball season. The Golden Flashes, led by 14th-year head coach Rob Senderoff, played their home games at the Memorial Athletic and Convocation Center, also known as the MAC Center, in Kent, Ohio as members of the Mid-American Conference.

== Previous season ==
The Golden Flashes finished the 2023–24 season 17–17, 8–10 in MAC play to finish in eighth place. They upset top-seeded Toledo and Bowling Green, before falling to Akron in the MAC tournament championship game.

== Offseason ==
=== Departures ===
Departures
Name	Number	Pos.	Height	Weight	Year	Hometown	Reason for departure
Julius Rollins	0	G	6'7"	199	RS Sophomore	Chicago, Illinois	Transferred to Western Illinois
Reggie Bass	2	G	6'3"	185	Sophomore	Muncie, Indiana	Transferred to Lindenwood
Chris Payton Jr.	4	F	6'7"	226	Graduate student	Bloomington, Illinois	Exhausted eligibility
Giovanni Santiago	11	G	6'1"	170	RS Senior	Bayamón, Puerto Rico	Exhausted eligibility
Tyem Freeman	22	G	6'5"	206	Graduate student	Springfield, Missouri	Transferred to UIC
LA Hayes	24	G	6'5"	181	Freshman	Cleveland, Ohio	Transferred to Frank Phillips College
Jake Snyder	31	G	6'1"	175	Graduate student	Stow, Ohio	Exhausted eligibility

=== Incoming transfers ===
Incoming transfers
Name	Number	Pos.	Height	Weight	Year	Hometown	Previous school
Marquis Barnett	2	G	6'4"	195	Senior	Saginaw, Michigan	Presbyterian
Jamal Sumlin	4	G	6'3"	180	RS Sophomore	Cleveland, Ohio	Northwest Florida State College
Morgan Safford	8	G	6'5"	210	Graduate student	Columbus, Ohio	Miami (OH)
Cian Medley	11	G	5'11"	165	Sophomore	Sicklerville, New Jersey	Saint Louis
Anthony Morales	22	F	6'8"	195	Graduate student	Boston, Massachusetts	Boston University

=== Recruiting class ===
College recruiting information
Name	Hometown	School	Height	Weight	Commit date
Jonas Nichols; G	Akron, Ohio	Archbishop Hoban High School	6 ft 3 in (1.91 m)	206 lb (93 kg)	
Jonas Nichols; G	Recruit ratings: Rivals: 247Sports: ESPN: (78)				
Deandre Jones; F	Cleveland, Ohio	Garfield Heights High School	6 ft 8 in (2.03 m)	200 lb (91 kg)	
Deandre Jones; F	Recruit ratings: Rivals: 247Sports: ESPN: (N/A)				
Derrick Lee Jr. F	Novi, Michigan	IMG Academy	6 ft 5 in (1.96 m)	205 lb (93 kg)	
Derrick Lee Jr. F	Recruit ratings: Rivals: 247Sports: ESPN: (N/A)				
Drew Huffman; F	Cuyahoga Falls, Ohio	Cuyahoga Falls High School	6 ft 5 in (1.96 m)	223 lb (101 kg)	
Drew Huffman; F	Recruit ratings: Rivals: 247Sports: ESPN: (N/A)				
Jaiden Pennicott; G	Ajax, Ontario	Oakville Prep	6 ft 2 in (1.88 m)	164 lb (74 kg)	
Jaiden Pennicott; G	Recruit ratings: Rivals: 247Sports: ESPN: (N/A)				
Overall recruit ranking:
Note: In many cases, Scout, Rivals, 247Sports, On3, and ESPN may conflict in their listings of height and weight.; In these cases, the average was taken. ESPN grades are on a 100-point scale.; Sources: "2024 Team Ranking". Rivals.

== Preseason ==
On October 22, 2024 the MAC released the preseason coaches poll. Kent State was picked to finish third in the MAC regular season. Kent State received 3 votes to win the MAC Tournament.

=== Preseason rankings ===
MAC preseason poll
Predicted finish	Team	Votes (1st place)
1	Ohio	121 (11)
2	Akron	106 (1)
3	Kent State	99
4	Toledo	95
5	Bowling Green	73
6	Miami (OH)	72
7	Ball State	67
8	Central Michigan	55
9	Eastern Michigan	36
10	Western Michigan	33
11	Northern Illinois	24
12	Buffalo	11

MAC Tournament Champions: Ohio (8), Kent State (3), Toledo (1)

=== Preseason All-MAC ===
Preseason All-MAC teams
Team	Player	Position	Year
1st	VonCameron Davis	F	R-Sr.
2nd	Jalen Sullinger	G	Sr.

== Roster ==
2024–25 Kent State Golden Flashes men's basketball team
Players
Coaches

Pos.	#	Name	Height	Weight	Year	Previous school	Hometown
G	0	Jonas Nichols	6 ft 3 in (1.91 m)	206 lb (93 kg)	Fr	Archbishop Hoban High School	Akron, Ohio
F	1	VonCameron Davis	6 ft 5 in (1.96 m)	229 lb (104 kg)	RS Sr	Walnut Ridge High School	Columbus, Ohio
G	2	Marquis Barnett	6 ft 4 in (1.93 m)	195 lb (88 kg)	Sr	Presbyterian	Saginaw, Michigan
G	4	Jamal Sumlin	6 ft 3 in (1.91 m)	180 lb (82 kg)	RS So	Northwest Florida State College	Cleveland, Ohio
G	5	Brenden Moss	6 ft 5 in (1.96 m)	190 lb (86 kg)	RS So	Minnesota Prep	Rockford, Illinois
G	8	Morgan Safford	6 ft 5 in (1.96 m)	210 lb (95 kg)	GS	Miami (OH)	Columbus, Ohio
G	11	Cian Medley	5 ft 11 in (1.8 m)	165 lb (75 kg)	So	Saint Louis	Sicklerville, New Jersey
G	13	Jalen Sullinger	5 ft 10 in (1.78 m)	167 lb (76 kg)	Sr	Thomas Worthington High School	Columbus, Ohio
F	14	Magnus Entenmann	6 ft 8 in (2.03 m)	225 lb (102 kg)	RS So	International Sports Academy	Columbus, Ohio
G	15	Mike Bekelja	6 ft 0 in (1.83 m)	184 lb (83 kg)	GS	Duquesne	Solon, Ohio
F	21	Deandre Jones	6 ft 8 in (2.03 m)	200 lb (91 kg)	Fr	Garfield Heights High School	Cleveland, Ohio
F	22	Anthony Morales	6 ft 8 in (2.03 m)	195 lb (88 kg)	GS	Boston University	Boston, Massachusetts
F	23	Delrecco Gillespie	6 ft 8 in (2.03 m)	216 lb (98 kg)	Jr	East Coweta High School	Benton Harbor, Michigan
F	41	Derrick Lee Jr.	6 ft 5 in (1.96 m)	205 lb (93 kg)	Fr	IMG Academy	Novi, Michigan
C	42	Cli'Ron Hornbeak	6 ft 9 in (2.06 m)	238 lb (108 kg)	Sr	St. Francis de Sales School	Toledo, Ohio
F	55	Donovan Hunter	6 ft 8 in (2.03 m)	197 lb (89 kg)	So	SPIRE Institute	Columbus, Ohio
F		Drew Huffman	6 ft 5 in (1.96 m)	223 lb (101 kg)	Fr	Cuyahoga Falls High School	Cuyahoga Falls, Ohio
G		Jaiden Pennicott	6 ft 2 in (1.88 m)	164 lb (74 kg)	Fr	Oakville Prep	Ajax, Ontario

Head coach

- Rob Senderoff (Albany)

Assistant coach(es)

- Randal Holt (Kent State)
- Jon Fleming (Kent State)
- Jalen Avery (Kent State)
- Luke Trondson (Ohio State)
- Tommy Luce (Purdue)

Legend

- (C) Team captain
- (S) Suspended
- (I) Ineligible
- (W) Walk-on
- Injured
- Current redshirt

Roster
Last update: November 12, 2024

== Schedule and results ==
Date time, TV	Rank^{#}	Opponent^{#}	Result	Record	High points	High rebounds	High assists	Site (attendance) city, state
Regular season
November 4, 2024*; 8:00 pm, ESPN+		at Louisiana; MAC-SBC Challenge	W 70–66	1–0	17 – Davis	9 – Safford	3 – Sullinger	Cajundome (1,412); Lafayette, LA
November 8, 2024*; 7:00 pm, ESPN+		Miami Hamilton	W 98–53	2–0	18 – Tied	9 – Hornbeak	6 – Sullinger	MAC Center (2,056); Kent, OH
November 13, 2024*; 8:00 pm, SECN+/ESPN+		at No. 5 Auburn	L 56–79	2–1	19 – Davis	7 – Hornbeak	2 – Medley	Neville Arena (9,121); Auburn, AL
November 21, 2024*; 7:00 pm, ESPN+		Niagara	W 76–73	3–1	17 – Safford	7 – Safford	4 – Medley	MAC Center (1,886); Kent, OH
November 23, 2024*; 7:00 pm, ESPN+		at Cleveland State	W 68–52	4–1	11 – Tied	11 – Hornbeak	5 – Davis	Wolstein Center (2,019); Cleveland, OH
November 28, 2024*; 9:30 pm, ESPN+		vs. Towson; Western Slam	W 65–54	5–1	18 – Davis	6 – Safford	3 – Tied	VisitLethbridge.com Arena (1,256); Lethbridge, AB
November 29, 2024*; 9:30 pm, ESPN+		vs. UC Irvine; Western Slam	L 39–51	5–2	9 – Gillespie	7 – Hornbeak	2 – Tied	VisitLethbridge.com Arena (1,478); Lethbridge, AB
November 30, 2024*; 7:30 pm, ESPN+		vs. Kennesaw State; Western Slam	W 67–60	6–2	16 – Davis	7 – Tied	3 – Tied	VisitLethbridge.com Arena (1,603); Lethbridge, AB
December 6, 2024*; 7:00 pm, ESPN+		Portland	W 76–57	7–2	16 – Davis	11 – Safford	6 – Medley	MAC Center (1,374); Kent, OH
December 15, 2024*; 5:00 pm, ESPN+		Mercyhurst	W 82–57	8–2	17 – Davis	6 – Hornbeak	4 – Medley	MAC Center (1,376); Kent, OH
December 22, 2024*; 1:00 pm, SECN		at No. 6 Alabama	L 54–81	8–3	9 – Tied	9 – Hornbeak	2 – Barnett	Coleman Coliseum (12,198); Tuscaloosa, AL
December 29, 2024*; 3:30 pm, ESPN+		Heidelberg	W 84–80	9–3	25 – Sullinger	10 – Hornbeak	5 – Tied	MAC Center (2,960); Kent, OH
January 4, 2025; 1:00 pm, ESPN+		Ball State	L 67–75	9–4 (0–1)	20 – Davis	5 – Tied	4 – Tied	MAC Center (1,608); Kent, OH
January 7, 2025; 7:00 pm, ESPN+		at Northern Illinois	W 68–50	10–4 (1–1)	31 – Davis	11 – Hornbeak	5 – Medley	Convocation Center (1,004); DeKalb, IL
January 10, 2025; 6:00 pm, CBSSN		at Buffalo	W 68–49	11–4 (2–1)	20 – Davis	8 – Tied	8 – Medley	Alumni Arena (1,448); Amherst, NY
January 14, 2025; 7:00 pm, ESPN+		Western Michigan	L 83–94	11–5 (2–2)	32 – Sullinger	9 – Gillespie	9 – Medley	MAC Center (1,488); Kent, OH
January 18, 2025; 3:30 pm, ESPN+		Miami (OH)	L 61–70	11–6 (2–3)	15 – Medley	8 – Gillespie	5 – Davis	MAC Center (3,054); Kent, OH
January 21, 2025; 7:00 pm, ESPN+		at Toledo	W 83–64	12–6 (3–3)	22 – Medley	8 – Sumlin	7 – Medley	Savage Arena (3,983); Toledo, OH
January 24, 2025; 7:00 pm, ESPNU		at Ohio	L 59–61	12–7 (3–4)	13 – Tied	11 – Hornbeak	3 – Medley	Convocation Center (5,134); Athens, OH
January 28, 2025; 7:00 pm, ESPN+		Bowling Green	W 75–57	13–7 (4–4)	24 – Davis	7 – Gillespie	10 – Medley	MAC Center (1,988); Kent, OH
January 31, 2025; 7:00 pm, CBSSN		Akron	L 71–85	13–8 (4–5)	23 – Sullinger	8 – Tied	2 – Tied	MAC Center (6,327); Kent, OH
February 4, 2025; 6:30 pm, ESPN+		at Eastern Michigan	W 70–49	14–8 (5–5)	15 – Davis	18 – Gillespie	6 – Medley	George Gervin GameAbove Center (1,696); Ypsilanti, MI
February 8, 2025*; 2:00 pm, ESPN+		Arkansas State; MAC–SBC Challenge	W 76–75	15–8	27 – Sullinger	9 – Gillespie	4 – Tied	MAC Center (1,746); Kent, OH
February 11, 2025; 7:00 pm, ESPN+		Central Michigan	W 91–83	16–8 (6–5)	28 – Barnett	14 – Gillespie	7 – Medley	MAC Center (1,280); Kent, OH
February 14, 2025; 7:00 pm, CBSSN		Ohio	W 76–75	17–8 (7–5)	24 – Medley	12 – Gillespie	3 – Davis	MAC Center (2,113); Kent, OH
February 18, 2025; 7:00 pm, ESPN+		at Bowling Green	W 91–84	18–8 (8–5)	32 – Sullinger	7 – Tied	7 – Sumlin	Stroh Center (1,418); Bowling Green, OH
February 21, 2025; 8:00 pm, CBSSN		at Miami (OH)	L 92–96 ^{OT}	18–9 (8–6)	20 – Tied	12 – Gillespie	5 – Sumlin	Millett Hall (6,339); Oxford, OH
February 25, 2025; 7:00 pm, ESPN+		Toledo	W 105–65	19–9 (9–6)	21 – Davis	9 – Hornbeak	7 – Sumlin	MAC Center (2,104); Kent, OH
February 28, 2025; 9:00 p.m., ESPN2		at Akron	L 72–77	19–10 (9–7)	19 – Sullinger	8 – Gillespie	5 – Medley	James A. Rhodes Arena (4,967); Akron, OH
March 4, 2025; 7:00 pm, ESPN+		at Western Michigan	W 77–76	20–10 (10–7)	31 – Sullinger	18 – Gillespie	8 – Medley	University Arena (1,503); Kalamazoo, MI
March 7, 2025; 7:00 pm, ESPN+		Eastern Michigan	W 76–70	21–10 (11–7)	18 – Sullinger	6 – Hornbeak	3 – Tied	MAC Center (2,231); Kent, OH
MAC tournament
March 13, 2025; 6:30 pm, ESPN+	(3)	vs. (6) Western Michigan; Quarterfinals	W 73–66	22–10	18 – Barnett	10 – Gillespie	5 – Medley	Rocket Arena (8,737); Cleveland, OH
March 14, 2025; 7:30 pm, CBSSN	(3)	vs. (2) Miami (OH); Semifinals	L 64–72	22–11	29 – Sullinger	12 – Gillespie	3 – Medley	Rocket Arena (7,738); Cleveland, OH
NIT
March 18, 2025; 7:00 pm, ESPNU		at (3) St. Bonaventure; First round – San Francisco Region	W 75–56	23–11	14 – Tied	12 – Hornbeak	4 – Sumlin	Reilly Center (3,024); St. Bonaventure, NY
March 23, 2025; 9:00 pm, ESPN2		at (2) Stanford; Second round – San Francisco Region	W 77–75	24–11	34 – Sullinger	14 – Gillespie	5 – Sullinger	Maples Pavilion (1,542); Stanford, CA
March 26, 2025; 7:00 pm, ESPN2		at Loyola Chicago; Quarterfinals – San Francisco Region	L 62–72	24–12	12 – Sullinger	12 – Gillespie	4 – Medley	Joseph J. Gentile Arena (3,554); Chicago, IL
*Non-conference game. ^{#}Rankings from AP Poll. (#) Tournament seedings in parentheses. All times are in Eastern.
