= 2024–25 South Alabama Jaguars men's basketball team =

American college basketball season

2024–25 South Alabama Jaguars men's basketball

Sun Belt regular season co-champions
- Conference: Sun Belt Conference
- Record: 21–11 (13–5 Sun Belt)
- Head coach: Richie Riley (7th season)
- Associate head coach: Rodney Crawford
- Assistant coaches: Mikel Kosich; Orin Bailey, Jr.; Riley Conroy
- Home arena: Mitchell Center

2024–25 Sun Belt Conference men's basketball standings
	Conf.				Overall
Team	W		L	PCT	W		L	PCT
South Alabama	13	–	5	.722	21	–	11	.656
James Madison	13	–	5	.722	20	–	12	.625
Troy †	13	–	5	.722	23	–	11	.676
Arkansas State	13	–	5	.722	25	–	11	.694
Marshall	12	–	6	.667	20	–	13	.606
Appalachian State	10	–	8	.556	17	–	14	.548
Texas State	9	–	9	.500	16	–	16	.500
Georgia State	8	–	10	.444	14	–	19	.424
Georgia Southern	8	–	10	.444	17	–	16	.515
Old Dominion	8	–	10	.444	15	–	20	.429
Louisiana	8	–	10	.444	12	–	21	.364
Southern Miss	5	–	13	.278	11	–	22	.333
Coastal Carolina	3	–	15	.167	10	–	22	.313
Louisiana–Monroe	3	–	15	.167	7	–	25	.219
† 2025 Sun Belt tournament winner

The 2024–25 South Alabama Jaguars men's basketball team represented the University of South Alabama in the 2024–25 NCAA Division I men's basketball season. The Jaguars, led by seventh-year head coach Richie Riley, played their home games at the Mitchell Center in Mobile, Alabama as members in the Sun Belt Conference.

The Jaguars were briefly offered a bid to the 2025 National Invitation Tournament, but the offer was revoked when UC Riverside withdrew from the College Basketball Invitational to accept an NIT bid.

== Previous season ==
The Jaguars finished the 2023–24 season 16–16, 8–10 in Sun Belt play to finish in a three-way tie for seventh place. In the Sun Belt tournament, they lost in the second round to Georgia Southern.

== Offseason ==
=== Departures ===
Name	Number	Pos.	Height	Weight	Year	Hometown	Reason for departure
Tyrell "Turbo" Jones	0	G	6'2"	190	Senior	Chicago, IL	Graduated; Signed to play with Enosis Neon Paralimni B.C.
Isiah Gaiter	2	G	6'3"	195	Senior	Meriden, CT	Graduated
Marcus "Smurf" Millender	4	G	5'11"	180	Freshman	Houston, TX	Transferred to UTSA
Thomas Howell	13	F	6'8"	230	Junior	Natchitoches, LA	Graduated
Marshall Kearing	20	F	6'9"	235	Senior	Pinjarra, Australia	Graduated; Promoted to Director of Player Personnel
Samuel Tabe	45	G	6'5"	210	GS Senior	Beltsville, MD	Graduated; Signed to play with Psychiko B.C.

=== Incoming transfers ===
Name	Number	Pos.	Height	Weight	Year	Hometown	Previous School
Cantia Rahming	0	F	6'7"	205	Graduate	Tampa, FL	Saint Leo
Jayden Cooper	1	G	6'2"	185	Sophomore	Pike Road, AL	Faulkner
Dylan Fasoyiro	2	G	6'3"	195	Graduate	Houston, TX	Daemen
JJ Wheat	6	G	6'0"	185	Junior	Clarksville, TN	Freed–Hardeman
Myles Corey	20	G	6'0"	185	Graduate	Ontario, CA	Jessup
Barry Dunning Jr.	22	SF	6'6"	195	Junior	Mobile, AL	UAB
Caleb Kizer	32	F	6'7"	230	Senior	Metamora, IL	Culver–Stockton
Randy Brady	34	G/F	6'5"	215	Junior	Chattanooga, TN	Chattanooga

=== Recruiting classes ===
==== 2025 recruiting class ====
College recruiting information (2025)
Name	Hometown	School	Height	Weight	Commit date
Samuel Shoptaw; PG	Windermere, FL	Windermere Prep	6 ft 2 in (1.88 m)	185 lb (84 kg)	Aug 27, 2024
Samuel Shoptaw; PG	Recruit ratings: No ratings found				
Desmond Williams; PG	Mobile, AL	Baker High School	6 ft 2 in (1.88 m)	160 lb (73 kg)	Jun 4, 2024
Desmond Williams; PG	Recruit ratings: No ratings found				
Stephen Williams; PF	Monroeville, AL	Coastal Alabama - North	6 ft 9 in (2.06 m)	220 lb (100 kg)	Mar 19, 2025
Stephen Williams; PF	Recruit ratings: No ratings found				
Overall recruit ranking:
Note: In many cases, Scout, Rivals, 247Sports, On3, and ESPN may conflict in their listings of height and weight.; In these cases, the average was taken. ESPN grades are on a 100-point scale.; Sources: "2025 Team Ranking". Rivals.

== Preseason ==
=== Preseason Sun Belt Conference poll ===
The Jaguars were picked to finish in eleventh place in the conference's preseason poll.

Coaches poll
Predicted finish	Team (1st place Votes)
1	Arkansas State - 193 (12)
2	James Madison - 170 (1)
3	Troy - 155 (1)
4	Louisiana - 144
5	Southern Miss - 133
6	App State - 122
7	Texas State - 89
T8	Georgia Southern - 85
T8	Old Dominion - 85
10	Marshall - 79
11	South Alabama - 78
12	Georgia State - 75
13	Coastal Carolina - 34
14	ULM - 28

== Roster ==
2024–25 South Alabama Jaguars men's basketball team
Players
Coaches

Pos.	#	Name	Height	Weight	Year	Previous school	Hometown
F	0	Cantia Rahming	6 ft 7 in (2.01 m)	205 lb (93 kg)	GS	Hillsborough HS; Saint Leo	Tampa, FL
G	1	Jayden Cooper	6 ft 2 in (1.88 m)	185 lb (84 kg)	So	Pike Road HS; Faulkner	Pike Road, AL
G	2	Dylan Fasoyiro	6 ft 3 in (1.91 m)	195 lb (88 kg)	GS	Mayfield Secondary; Daemen	Houston, TX
F	3	Elijah Ormiston	6 ft 8 in (2.03 m)	220 lb (100 kg)	Sr	Cannon HS; Concordia-St. Paul	Minneapolis, MN
G	6	JJ Wheat	6 ft 0 in (1.83 m)	185 lb (84 kg)	Jr	Clarksville HS; Freed–Hardeman	Clarksville, TN
G	10	Maxwell Land	6 ft 4 in (1.93 m)	195 lb (88 kg)	RS Jr	Archbishop Moeller HS; Saint Francis (PA)	Cincinnati, OH
F	12	Julian Margrave	6 ft 10 in (2.08 m)	210 lb (95 kg)	Jr	New Hampton School	Louisburg, KS
G	14	John Broom	6 ft 5 in (1.96 m)	190 lb (86 kg)	RS Fr	Jacksonville HS	Jacksonville, AL
G	20	Myles Corey	6 ft 0 in (1.83 m)	185 lb (84 kg)	GS	Bridgton Academy; Jessup	Ontario, CA
F	21	Ethan Kizer	6 ft 5 in (1.96 m)	195 lb (88 kg)	So	Metamora HS	Metamora, IL
G	22	Barry Dunning Jr.	6 ft 6 in (1.98 m)	195 lb (88 kg)	Jr	McGill–Toolen HS; Arkansas; UAB	Mobile, AL
F	25	Judah Brown	6 ft 6 in (1.98 m)	225 lb (102 kg)	GS	Pacifica Christian HS; Saint Mary's	Bermuda Dunes, CA
F	32	Caleb Kizer	6 ft 7 in (2.01 m)	230 lb (104 kg)	Sr	Metamora Township HS; Culver–Stockton	Metamora, IL
G/F	34	Randy Brady	6 ft 5 in (1.96 m)	215 lb (98 kg)	Jr	Hamilton Heights HS; Chattanooga	Chattanooga, TN

Head coach

- Richie Riley (Eastern Kentucky)

Assistant coach(es)

- Rodney Crawford (Cincinnati)
- Orin Bailey Jr. (Houston)
- Riley Conroy (Tulane)
- Mikel Kosich (Montana State Billings)

Legend

- (C) Team captain
- (S) Suspended
- (I) Ineligible
- (W) Walk-on
- Injured
- Current redshirt

Roster

== Schedule and results ==
Date time, TV	Rank^{#}	Opponent^{#}	Result	Record	High points	High rebounds	High assists	Site (attendance) city, state
Regular season
November 4, 2024*; 7:00 p.m., ESPN+		Central Michigan; MAC-SBC Challenge	L 70–74	0–1	20 – Corey	6 – Broom	11 – Corey	Mitchell Center (1,903); Mobile, AL
November 8, 2024*; 6:30 p.m., ESPN+		at Nicholls	W 70–64	1–1	18 – Corey	8 – Broom	8 – Corey	Stopher Gymnasium (644); Thibodaux, LA
November 12, 2024*; 7:00 p.m., SECN+/ESPN+		at No. 25 Ole Miss; Bob Weltlich Tad Pad game	L 54–64	1–2	16 – Brown	8 – Broom	5 – Corey	Tad Smith Coliseum (4,033); Oxford, MS
November 16, 2024*; 3:00 p.m., ESPN+		Mercer	W 75–66	2–2	28 – Corey	14 – Dunning Jr.	7 – Brady	Mitchell Center (1,652); Mobile, AL
November 18, 2024*; 7:00 p.m., ESPN+		Spring Hill	W 95–61	3–2	19 – Fasoyiro	9 – Broom	8 – Wheat	Mitchell Center (1,686); Mobile, AL
November 25, 2024*; 7:00 p.m., ESPN+		Incarnate Word; Jaguar Classic	W 84–63	4–2	19 – Corey	8 – Brady	5 – Wheat	Mitchell Center (1,771); Mobile, AL
November 26, 2024*; 7:00 p.m., ESPN+		Western Illinois; Jaguar Classic	L 63–64	4–3	17 – Corey	11 – Brady	4 – Brady	Mitchell Center (1,669); Mobile, AL
November 29, 2024*; 10:00 a.m.		Alcorn State	W 74–65 ^{OT}	5–3	25 – Corey	8 – Broom	5 – Wheat	Mitchell Center (250); Mobile, AL
December 8, 2024*; 3:00 p.m., ESPN+		Jacksonville State	W 76–74	6–3	12 – Corey	7 – Dunning Jr.	6 – Corey	Mitchell Center (1,754); Mobile, AL
December 15, 2024*; 11:00 a.m., ESPN+		at East Texas A&M	W 81–72	7–3	27 – Corey	7 – Wheat	7 – Wheat	The Field House (217); Commerce, TX
December 16, 2024*; 7:00 p.m., ESPN+		at TCU	L 49–58	7–4	17 – Dunning Jr.	9 – Rahming	3 – Tied	Schollmaier Arena (4,781); Fort Worth, TX
December 21, 2024; 1:00 p.m., ESPN+		James Madison	W 77–49	8–4 (1–0)	19 – Corey	7 – Broom	7 – Corey	Mitchell Center (1,574); Mobile, AL
December 30, 2024*; 7:00 p.m., ESPN+		Mobile	W 106–41	9–4	24 – Brown	9 – Dunning Jr.	7 – Wheat	Mitchell Center (2,090); Mobile, AL
January 2, 2025; 7:00 p.m., ESPN+		at Georgia State	W 77–51	10–4 (2–0)	22 – Dunning Jr.	8 – Dunning Jr.	7 – Corey	GSU Convocation Center (1,472); Atlanta, GA
January 4, 2025; 3:00 p.m., ESPN+		at Georgia Southern	W 76–47	11–4 (3–0)	11 – Tied	11 – Rahming	4 – Rahming	Hill Convocation Center (1,582); Statesboro, GA
January 9, 2025; 7:00 p.m., ESPN+		Arkansas State	W 76–62	12–4 (4–0)	22 – Ormiston	9 – Broom	6 – Corey	Mitchell Center (2,208); Mobile, AL
January 11, 2025; 2:00 p.m., ESPN+		Old Dominion	L 63–71 ^{OT}	12–5 (4–1)	20 – Corey	8 – Dunning Jr.	4 – Corey	Mitchell Center (2,089); Mobile, AL
January 15, 2025; 7:00 p.m., ESPN+		Southern Miss	W 75–62	13–5 (5–1)	17 – Fasoyiro	8 – Broom	4 – Brady	Mitchell Center (2,568); Mobile, AL
January 18, 2025; 3:00 p.m., ESPN+		Troy	W 64–63	14–5 (6–1)	14 – Dunning Jr.	8 – Dunning Jr.	3 – Dunning Jr.	Mitchell Center (5,148); Mobile, AL
January 25, 2025; 5:00 p.m., ESPN+		at Troy	L 55–65	14–6 (6–2)	17 – Cooper	9 – Dunning Jr.	3 – Dunning Jr.	Trojan Arena (5,041); Troy, AL
January 27, 2025; 6:30 p.m., ESPN+		at Louisiana–Monroe; Rescheduled from January 23	L 66–77	14–7 (6–3)	15 – Fasoyiro	9 – Dunning Jr.	7 – Corey	Fant-Ewing Coliseum (1,027); Monroe, LA
January 30, 2025; 7:00 p.m., ESPN+		Louisiana–Monroe	L 58–62	14–8 (6–4)	21 – Brown	10 – Broom	3 – Broom	Mitchell Center (2,085); Mobile, AL
February 1, 2025; 7:00 p.m., ESPN+		at Louisiana	W 62–58 ^{OT}	15–8 (7–4)	18 – Dunning Jr.	15 – Dunning Jr.	4 – Corey	Cajundome (2,112); Lafayette, LA
February 5, 2025; 6:00 p.m., ESPN+		at Coastal Carolina	W 84–59	16–8 (8–4)	27 – Corey	7 – Broom	4 – Tied	HTC Center (1,598); Conway, SC
February 8, 2025*; 1:00 p.m., ESPN+		at Akron; MAC-SBC Challenge	L 67–80	16–9	22 – Dunning Jr.	12 – Dunning Jr.	8 – Corey	James A. Rhodes Arena (1,505); Akron, OH
February 13, 2025; 7:00 p.m., ESPN+		Marshall	W 91–82 ^{OT}	17–9 (9–4)	26 – Ormiston	8 – Broom	4 – Broom	Mitchell Center (2,148); Mobile, AL
February 15, 2025; 3:00 p.m., ESPN+		Texas State	W 70–65 ^{OT}	18–9 (10–4)	34 – Dunning Jr.	11 – Dunning Jr.	5 – Corey	Mitchell Center (2,169); Mobile, AL
February 19, 2025; 7:00 p.m., ESPN+		at Arkansas State	W 60–56	19–9 (11–4)	14 – Dunning Jr.	8 – Dunning Jr.	4 – Corey	First National Bank Arena (5,124); Jonesboro, AR
February 22, 2025; 3:00 p.m., ESPN+		at Texas State	L 92–93 ^{OT}	19–10 (11–5)	46 – Dunning Jr.	6 – Rahming	6 – Corey	Strahan Arena (2,523); San Marcos, TX
February 26, 2025; 7:30 p.m., ESPN+		at Southern Miss	W 88–82	20–10 (12–5)	18 – Brown	11 – Dunning Jr.	9 – Corey	Reed Green Coliseum (3,241); Hattiesburg, MS
February 28, 2025; 7:00 p.m., ESPN+		Louisiana	W 65–42	21–10 (13–5)	28 – Ormiston	10 – Ormiston	4 – Corey	Mitchell Center (1,500); Mobile, AL
Sun Belt tournament
March 9, 2025; 5:00 p.m., ESPN+	(1)	vs. (4) Arkansas State; Semifinals	L 71–74	21–11	27 – Dunning Jr.	13 – Dunning Jr.	2 – Tied	Pensacola Bay Center; Pensacola, FL
*Non-conference game. ^{#}Rankings from AP Poll. (#) Tournament seedings in parentheses. All times are in Central Time.
