= 2024–25 Marshall Thundering Herd men's basketball team =

American college basketball season

2024–25 Marshall Thundering Herd men's basketball
- Conference: Sun Belt Conference
- Record: 20–13 (12–6 Sun Belt)
- Head coach: Cornelius Jackson (1st season)
- Associate head coach: Rob Fulford
- Assistant coaches: Mark Cline; Adam Williams
- Home arena: Cam Henderson Center

2024–25 Sun Belt Conference men's basketball standings
	Conf.				Overall
Team	W		L	PCT	W		L	PCT
South Alabama	13	–	5	.722	21	–	11	.656
James Madison	13	–	5	.722	20	–	12	.625
Troy †	13	–	5	.722	23	–	11	.676
Arkansas State	13	–	5	.722	25	–	11	.694
Marshall	12	–	6	.667	20	–	13	.606
Appalachian State	10	–	8	.556	17	–	14	.548
Texas State	9	–	9	.500	16	–	16	.500
Georgia State	8	–	10	.444	14	–	19	.424
Georgia Southern	8	–	10	.444	17	–	16	.515
Old Dominion	8	–	10	.444	15	–	20	.429
Louisiana	8	–	10	.444	12	–	21	.364
Southern Miss	5	–	13	.278	11	–	22	.333
Coastal Carolina	3	–	15	.167	10	–	22	.313
Louisiana–Monroe	3	–	15	.167	7	–	25	.219
† 2025 Sun Belt tournament winner

The 2024–25 Marshall Thundering Herd men's basketball team represented Marshall University during the 2024–25 NCAA Division I men's basketball season. The Thundering Herd, led by first-year head coach Cornelius Jackson, played their home games at the Cam Henderson Center in Huntington, West Virginia as members of the Sun Belt Conference. They finished the season 20–13, 12–6 in Sun Belt play to finish in fifth place. As the No. 5 seed in the Sun Belt tournament, they defeated Georgia State in the fourth round before losing to Arkansas State in the quarterfinals.

== Previous season ==
The Thundering Herd finished the 2023–24 season 13–20, 7–11 in Sun Belt play to finish in a tie for tenth place. As the No. 10 seed in the Sun Belt tournament, they defeated Georgia State in the second round before losing to James Madison in the quarterfinals.

After the season, it was announced that head coach Dan D'Antoni was let go and replaced by his associate head coach, Cornelius Jackson.

== Offseason ==
=== Departures ===
Name	Number	Pos.	Height	Weight	Year	Hometown	Notes
Kyle Braun	3	G	6' 2"	182	Junior	Los Angeles, CA	Left team due to personal reasons
Jacob Conner	4	G/F	6' 10"	209	Sophomore	Dayton, OH	Transferred to Dayton
Cameron Crawford	5	G	6' 5"	192	RS Sophomore	Hoover, AL	Transferred to Duquesne
Kamdyn Curfman	11	G	6' 1"	185	Senior	North Bethesda, MD	Graduated
Chase McKey	1	F	6' 10"	202	Junior	Atlanta, GA	Transferred to Western Carolina
Goran Miladinovic	21	C	7' 1"	240	GS Senior	Tivat, Montenegro	Graduated
Pete Moe II	32	F	6' 9"	217	Freshman	Atlanta, GA	Walk-on; Transferred to Barry
Marko Serenac	15	G/F	6' 7"	218	GS Senior	Ljubovija, Serbia	Graduated
Aymeric Toussaint	12	G/F	6' 10"	230	Junior	Saint-Denis, Réunion	Transferred to West Virginia State
Kevon Voyles	0	G	6' 3"	198	GS Senior	Cape Charles, VA	Graduated

=== Incoming transfers ===
Name	Number	Pos.	Height	Weight	Year	Hometown	Previous school
Mikal Dawson	23	G	6' 5"	222	GS Senior	Huntington, WV	Akron
Cade Gibbs	5	F	6' 6"	222	Senior	Plainfield, IN	Grace
Jakob Gibbs	4	F	6' 5"	208	Senior	Plainfield, IN	Grace
Dezayne Mingo	3	G	6' 4"	185	Junior	Hamilton, ON	Guelph
Kai Spears	0	G	6' 2"	164	Junior	Pittsburgh, PA	Alabama
Jalen Speer	50	G	6' 1"	182	GS Senior	Gainesville, FL	Florida A&M

=== 2024 recruiting class ===
College recruiting information
Name	Hometown	School	Height	Weight	Commit date
Will Moore; SG	Cumming, GA	West Forsyth High School	6 ft 4 in (1.93 m)	160 lb (73 kg)	Oct 12, 2023
Will Moore; SG	Recruit ratings: 247Sports: (NR)				
Erich Harding; PF	Lincolnton, NC	Combine Academy	6 ft 10 in (2.08 m)	215 lb (98 kg)	Oct 17, 2023
Erich Harding; PF	Recruit ratings: (NR)				
Kaiden White; SG	Orlando, FL	Olympia High School	6 ft 3 in (1.91 m)	160 lb (73 kg)	Jun 26, 2024
Kaiden White; SG	Recruit ratings: (NR)				
Overall recruit ranking: Rivals: NR 247Sports: 189 ESPN: NR
Note: In many cases, Scout, Rivals, 247Sports, On3, and ESPN may conflict in their listings of height and weight.; In these cases, the average was taken. ESPN grades are on a 100-point scale.; Sources: "Marshall Basketball Commitment List". Rivals.; "ESPN". ESPN.; "2024 Team Ranking". Rivals.

== Preseason ==
=== Preseason Sun Belt Conference poll ===
The Thundering Herd were picked to finish in tenth place in the conference's preseason poll. Senior forward Nate Martin was named to the preseason All-SBC First Team. Fifth-year forward Obinna Anochili-Killen was named to the conference preseason second team.

Coaches poll
Predicted finish	Team (1st-place votes)
1	Arkansas State – 193 (12)
2	James Madison – 170 (1)
3	Troy – 155 (1)
4	Louisiana – 144
5	Southern Miss – 133
6	App State – 122
7	Texas State – 89
T8	Georgia Southern – 85
T8	Old Dominion – 85
10	Marshall – 79
11	South Alabama – 78
12	Georgia State – 75
13	Coastal Carolina – 34
14	ULM – 28

== Roster ==
2024–25 Marshall Thundering Herd men's basketball team
Players
Coaches

Pos.	#	Name	Height	Weight	Year	Previous school	Hometown
G	0	Kai Spears (W)	6 ft 2 in (1.88 m)	164 lb (74 kg)	Jr	Alabama	Pittsburgh, PA
F	2	Wyatt Fricks	6 ft 10 in (2.08 m)	205 lb (93 kg)	RS Jr	Winder-Barrow	Winder, GA
G	3	Dezayne Mingo	6 ft 4 in (1.93 m)	185 lb (84 kg)	Jr	Guelph	Hamilton, ON
F	4	Jakob Gibbs	6 ft 5 in (1.96 m)	208 lb (94 kg)	Sr	Grace	Plainfield, IN
F	5	Cade Gibbs	6 ft 6 in (1.98 m)	222 lb (101 kg)	Sr	Grace	Plainfield, IN
G	7	Ryan Nutter	6 ft 4 in (1.93 m)	189 lb (86 kg)	So	Dublin Jerome	Dublin, OH
G	8	Kycen Pruett	6 ft 4 in (1.93 m)	184 lb (83 kg)	So	Mount Dora Christian	Mount Dora, FL
G	9	Kaiden White	6 ft 3 in (1.91 m)	180 lb (82 kg)	Fr	Olympia	Orlando, FL
F	11	Erich Harding	6 ft 10 in (2.08 m)	222 lb (101 kg)	Fr	Combine Academy	Charlotte, NC
G	12	Will Moore	6 ft 4 in (1.93 m)	188 lb (85 kg)	Fr	West Forsyth	Cumming, GA
G	13	Creighton Thienneman (W)	6 ft 5 in (1.96 m)	195 lb (88 kg)	RS Jr	South Oldham	Louisville, KY
G	14	Grant Moore (W)	6 ft 6 in (1.98 m)	190 lb (86 kg)	RS So	Columbus State	Alpharetta, GA
G	23	Mikal Dawson (C)	6 ft 5 in (1.96 m)	222 lb (101 kg)	GS	Akron	Huntington, WV
F	25	Obinna Anochili-Killen (C)	6 ft 8 in (2.03 m)	220 lb (100 kg)	GS	Chapmanville	Lagos, Nigeria
F	41	Nate Martin (C)	6 ft 8 in (2.03 m)	230 lb (104 kg)	Sr	Texas State	Houston, TX
G	50	Jalen Speer	6 ft 1 in (1.85 m)	182 lb (83 kg)	GS	Florida A&M	Gainesville, FL

Head coach

- Cornelius Jackson (Marshall)

Assistant coach(es)

- Rob Fulford (Marshall)
- Mark Cline (Wake Forest)
- Adam Williams (Marshall)

Legend

- (C) Team captain
- (S) Suspended
- (I) Ineligible
- (W) Walk-on
- Injured
- Current redshirt

Roster
Last update: February 18, 2025

== Schedule and results ==
Date time, TV	Rank^{#}	Opponent^{#}	Result	Record	High points	High rebounds	High assists	Site (attendance) city, state
Exhibition
October 27, 2024*; 4:00 p.m.		Pikeville	W 90–73	–	17 – Mingo	10 – C. Gibbs	5 – Mingo	Cam Henderson Center; Huntington, WV
Regular season
November 4, 2024*; 7:00 p.m., ESPN+		Davis & Elkins	W 90–57	1–0	18 – Anochili-Killen	11 – Fricks	5 – Dawson	Cam Henderson Center (3,993); Huntington, WV
November 9, 2024*; 2:00 p.m., ESPN+		Toledo	L 80–90	1–1	17 – Martin	14 – Martin	6 – Mingo	Cam Henderson Center (3,759); Huntington, WV
November 11, 2024*; 7:00 p.m., ESPN+		Southern Indiana	W 77–63	2–1	19 – Mingo	8 – Anochili-Killen	7 – Nutter	Cam Henderson Center (3,615); Huntington, WV
November 16, 2024*; 7:00 p.m., ESPN+		Bellarmine	W 83–62	3–1	23 – Martin	9 – Tied	8 – Mingo	Cam Henderson Center (4,153); Huntington, WV
November 23, 2024*; 12:00 p.m., BTN+		at No. 6 Purdue	L 45–80	3–2	9 – Martin	7 – Martin	2 – Tied	Mackey Arena (14,876); West Lafayette, IN
November 27, 2024*; 7:00 p.m., ESPN+		South Carolina State	W 82–53	4–2	18 – Dawson	17 – Martin	9 – Mingo	Cam Henderson Center (3,766); Huntington, WV
November 30, 2024*; 8:00 p.m., ESPN+		at Western Kentucky	L 82–90	4–3	28 – Dawson	8 – Martin	4 – Tied	E. A. Diddle Arena (3,120); Bowling Green, KY
December 4, 2024*; 7:00 p.m., ESPN+		Morehead State	W 80–77	5–3	17 – Tied	10 – Anochili-Killen	5 – Dawson	Cam Henderson Center (3,836); Huntington, WV
December 7, 2024*; 2:00 p.m., FloHoops		at UNC Wilmington	L 69–78	5–4	12 – Dawson	9 – Martin	5 – Mingo	Trask Coliseum (4,811); Wilmington, NC
December 11, 2024*; 7:00 p.m., ESPN+		at Wright State	L 79–88	5–5	20 – Dawson	6 – Anochili-Killen	4 – Mingo	Nutter Center (3,569); Fairborn, OH
December 14, 2024*; 4:00 p.m., ESPN+		Ohio	W 79–70	6–5	27 – Dawson	10 – Anochili-Killen	3 – Tied	Cam Henderson Center (4,278); Huntington, WV
December 16, 2024*; 7:00 p.m., ESPN+		West Virginia Wesleyan	W 93–63	7–5	19 – Dawson	8 – Mingo	10 – Mingo	Cam Henderson Center (3,424); Huntington, WV
December 21, 2024; 3:00 p.m., ESPN+		at Southern Miss	L 66–68	7–6 (0–1)	15 – Anochili-Killen	9 – Martin	4 – Martin	Reed Green Coliseum (3,204); Hattiesburg, MS
December 28, 2024*; 7:00 p.m., FloSports		at Elon	L 59–73	7–7	24 – Dawson	10 – Martin	4 – Nutter	Schar Center (1,956); Elon, NC
January 2, 2025; 7:00 p.m., ESPN+		Texas State	W 77–71	8–7 (1–1)	23 – Mingo	7 – Martin	5 – Mingo	Cam Henderson Center (3,694); Huntington, WV
January 4, 2025; 4:00 p.m., ESPN+		Troy	L 57–58	8–8 (1–2)	17 – Anochili-Killen	9 – Anochili-Killen	4 – Martin	Cam Henderson Center (4,014); Huntington, WV
January 9, 2025; 7:00 p.m., ESPN+		James Madison	W 80–78	9–8 (2–2)	27 – Speer	8 – Dawson	4 – Mingo	Cam Henderson Center (4,009); Huntington, WV
January 11, 2025; 4:00 p.m., ESPN+		Georgia Southern	W 81–69	10–8 (3–2)	21 – Dawson	13 – Martin	7 – Mingo	Cam Henderson Center (3,866); Huntington, WV
January 16, 2025; 7:00 p.m., ESPN+		at James Madison	L 64–67	10–9 (3–3)	20 – Speer	12 – Martin	2 – Mingo	Atlantic Union Bank Center (3,335); Harrisonburg, VA
January 18, 2025; 3:30 p.m., ESPN+		at Coastal Carolina	W 77–64	11–9 (4–3)	23 – Anochili-Killen	9 – Martin	7 – Mingo	HTC Center (1,873); Conway, SC
January 23, 2025; 7:00 p.m., ESPN+		at Georgia State	W 92–79	12–9 (5–3)	25 – Speer	10 – Anochili-Killen	7 – Speer	GSU Convocation Center (1,557); Atlanta, GA
January 25, 2025; 3:00 p.m., ESPN+		at Georgia Southern	W 71–67	13–9 (6–3)	16 – Speer	8 – Martin	5 – Mingo	Hill Convocation Center (3,135); Statesboro, GA
January 30, 2025; 7:00 p.m., ESPN+		Georgia State	L 81–85	13–10 (6–4)	23 – Mingo	7 – Martin	7 – Mingo	Cam Henderson Center (4,402); Huntington, WV
February 1, 2025; 4:00 p.m., ESPN+		Coastal Carolina	W 67–62	14–10 (7–4)	18 – Mingo	7 – Martin	6 – Mingo	Cam Henderson Center (5,105); Huntington, WV
February 5, 2025; 9:00 p.m., ESPNU		Arkansas State	W 77–72	15–10 (8–4)	18 – Martin	14 – Martin	10 – Mingo	Cam Henderson Center (4,309); Huntington, WV
February 13, 2025; 8:00 p.m., ESPN+		at South Alabama	L 82–91 ^{OT}	15–11 (8–5)	20 – Anochili-Killen	16 – Martin	5 – Mingo	Mitchell Center (2,148); Mobile, AL
February 15, 2025; 8:00 p.m., ESPN+		at Louisiana	L 68–79	15–12 (8–6)	18 – Anochili-Killen	10 – Martin	4 – Mingo	Cajundome (1,484); Lafayette, LA
February 20, 2025; 7:00 p.m., ESPN+		at Old Dominion	W 81–77	16–12 (9–6)	24 – Anochili-Killen	8 – Tied	6 – Mingo	Chartway Arena (3,839); Norfolk, VA
February 22, 2025; 1:00 p.m., ESPN+		at Appalachian State	W 69–59	17–12 (10–6)	25 – Mingo	8 – Speer	4 – Tied	Holmes Center (4,310); Boone, NC
February 25, 2025; 7:00 p.m., ESPN+		Old Dominion	W 83–66	18–12 (11–6)	22 – Mingo	8 – Anochili-Killen	6 – Mingo	Cam Henderson Center (5,133); Huntington, WV
February 28, 2025; 9:00 p.m., ESPNU		Appalachian State	W 75–57	19–12 (12–6)	16 – C. Gibbs	11 – Mingo	5 – Tied	Cam Henderson Center (5,223); Huntington, WV
Sun Belt Conference tournament
March 7, 2025; 6:00 p.m., ESPN+	(5)	vs. (8) Georgia State; Fourth round	W 79–76	20–12	19 – Mingo	14 – Martin	8 – Mingo	Pensacola Bay Center (1,201); Pensacola, FL
March 8, 2025; 6:30 p.m., ESPN+	(5)	vs. (4) Arkansas State; Quarterfinals	L 74–77	20–13	26 – Anochili-Killen	13 – Anochili-Killen	6 – Mingo	Pensacola Bay Center; Pensacola, FL
*Non-conference game. ^{#}Rankings from AP poll. (#) Tournament seedings in parentheses. All times are in Eastern.
