= 2026 Southland Conference men's basketball tournament =

American college basketball tournament

- Classification: Division I
- Season: 2025–26
- Teams: 8
- Site: Townsley Law Arena; Lake Charles, Louisiana
- Champions: McNeese (5th title)
- Winning coach: Bill Armstrong (1st title)
- MVP: Javohn Garcia (McNeese)
- Attendance: 5,272 (championship)
- Television: ESPN+, ESPNU, ESPN2

2025–26 Southland Conference men's basketball standings
	Conf.				Overall
Team	W		L	PCT	W		L	PCT
Stephen F. Austin	20	–	2	.909	28	–	6	.824
McNeese †	19	–	3	.864	28	–	6	.824
UT Rio Grande Valley	14	–	8	.636	19	–	14	.576
Texas A&M–Corpus Christi	13	–	9	.591	18	–	15	.545
New Orleans	12	–	10	.545	15	–	18	.455
Nicholls	12	–	10	.545	14	–	19	.424
Northwestern State	8	–	14	.364	10	–	22	.313
Houston Christian	8	–	14	.364	12	–	20	.375
Incarnate Word	7	–	15	.318	12	–	19	.387
Lamar	7	–	15	.318	12	–	19	.387
East Texas A&M	6	–	16	.273	11	–	21	.344
Southeastern Louisiana	6	–	16	.273	9	–	22	.290
† 2026 Southland tournament winner

The 2026 Southland Conference men's basketball tournament was the postseason men's basketball tournament for the 2025–26 season of the Southland Conference. The tournament was held March 8–11, 2026, at Townsley Law Arena in Lake Charles, Louisiana. The tournament winner, McNeese, received the conference's automatic invitation to the 2026 NCAA Division I men's basketball tournament.

== Seeds ==
Teams were seeded by record within the conference, with a tie–breaker system to seed teams with identical conference records. Eight teams in the conference qualified for the tournament. The top two seeds received double byes into the semifinals in the merit-based format. The No. 3 and No. 4 seeds receive dsingle byes to the quarterfinals. Tiebreakers used are 1) Head-to-head results, 2) comparison of records against individual teams in the conference starting with the top-ranked team(s) and working down and 3) NCAA NET rankings available on day following the conclusion of regular-season play.

Seed	School	Conference	Tiebreaker
1	Stephen F. Austin	20–2	
2	McNeese	19–3	
3	UT Rio Grande Valley	14–8	
4	Texas A&M–Corpus Christi	13–9	
5	New Orleans	12–10	1–1 vs. Stephen F. Austin
6	Nicholls	12–10	0–2 vs. Stephen F. Austin
7	Northwestern State	8–14	1–1 vs. UT Rio Grande Valley
8	Houston Christian	8–14	0–2 vs. UT Rio Grande Valley
DNQ	Incarnate Word	7–15	1–1 vs. McNeese
DNQ	Lamar	7–15	0–2 vs. McNeese
DNQ	East Texas A&M	6–16	2–0 vs. Southeastern Louisiana
DNQ	Southeastern Louisiana	6–16	0–2 vs. East Texas A&M

== Schedule ==
Session	Game	Time*	Matchup^{#}	Score	Television	Attendance
First round – Sunday, March 8
1	1	5:00 p.m.	No. 5 New Orleans vs. No. 8 Houston Christian	73–60	ESPN+	2,835
1	2	7:30 p.m.	No. 6 Nicholls vs. No. 7 Northwestern State	61–47	ESPN+	2,835
Quarterfinals – Monday, March 9
2	3	5:00 p.m.	No. 4 Texas A&M–Corpus Christi vs. No. 5 New Orleans	74–61	ESPN+	
2	4	7:30 p.m.	No. 3 UT Rio Grande Valley vs. No. 6 Nicholls	86–68	ESPN+	
Semifinals – Tuesday, March 10
3	5	6:00 p.m.	No. 1 Stephen F. Austin vs. No. 4 Texas A&M–Corpus Christi	60–58	ESPNU	4,481
3	6	8:30 p.m.	No. 2 McNeese vs. No. 3 UT Rio Grande Valley	84–80^{3OT}	ESPN+	4,481
Championship – Wednesday, March 11
4	7	4:00 p.m.	No. 1 Stephen F. Austin vs. No. 2 McNeese	59–76	ESPN2	5,272
*Game times in CDT. #-Rankings denote tournament seeding.

== Bracket ==
First round Sunday, March 8 ESPN+
5	New Orleans	73
8	Houston Christian	60
6	Nicholls	61
7	Northwestern State	47

Quarterfinals; Monday, March 9 ESPN+
4	Texas A&M–Corpus Christi	74
5	New Orleans	61
3	UT Rio Grande Valley	86
6	Nicholls	68

Semifinals; Tuesday, March 10; ESPNU/ESPN+
1	Stephen F. Austin	60
4	Texas A&M–Corpus Christi	58
2	McNeese	84***
3	UT Rio Grande Valley	80

Championship; Wednesday, March 11; ESPN2
1	Stephen F. Austin	59
2	McNeese	76

* denotes overtime period

== Awards and honors ==
2026 Southland Conference Men's Basketball All-Tournament Team
- (MVP) Javohn Garcia (McNeese)
- Larry Johnson (McNeese)
- Tyshawn Archie (McNeese)
- Keon Thompson (Stephen F. Austin)
- Koree Cotton (UT Rio Grande Valley)

== See also ==
- 2026 Southland Conference women's basketball tournament
