= 2025–26 McNeese Cowboys basketball team =

American college basketball season

2025–26 McNeese Cowboys basketball

Southland tournament champions

NCAA tournament, First round
- Conference: Southland Conference
- Record: 28–6 (19–3 Southland)
- Head coach: Bill Armstrong (1st season)
- Assistant coaches: Robi Coker; LeBrent Walker; Jeffery Armstrong
- Home arena: Townsley Law Arena

2025–26 Southland Conference men's basketball standings
	Conf.				Overall
Team	W		L	PCT	W		L	PCT
Stephen F. Austin	20	–	2	.909	28	–	6	.824
McNeese †	19	–	3	.864	28	–	6	.824
UT Rio Grande Valley	14	–	8	.636	19	–	14	.576
Texas A&M–Corpus Christi	13	–	9	.591	18	–	15	.545
New Orleans	12	–	10	.545	15	–	18	.455
Nicholls	12	–	10	.545	14	–	19	.424
Northwestern State	8	–	14	.364	10	–	22	.313
Houston Christian	8	–	14	.364	12	–	20	.375
Incarnate Word	7	–	15	.318	12	–	19	.387
Lamar	7	–	15	.318	12	–	19	.387
East Texas A&M	6	–	16	.273	11	–	21	.344
Southeastern Louisiana	6	–	16	.273	9	–	22	.290
† 2026 Southland tournament winner

The 2025–26 McNeese Cowboys basketball team represented McNeese State University in the 2025–26 NCAA Division I men's basketball season. The Cowboys, led by first-year head coach Bill Armstrong, played their home games on-campus at Townsley Law Arena in Lake Charles, Louisiana as members of the Southland Conference.

== Previous season ==
The Cowboys finished the 2024–25 season 28–7, 19–1 in Southland play, to finish as Southland regular-season champions. They defeated Northwestern State and Lamar to win the Southland tournament title, earning their second-consecutive bid to the NCAA tournament. In the NCAA tournament, they received the #12 seed in the Midwest Region once again, where they defeated Clemson in the first round, giving them their first NCAA tournament win in program history. They advanced to the second round in the tournament, where they lost to Purdue.

== Roster ==
2025–26 McNeese Cowboys men's basketball team
Players
Coaches

Pos.	#	Name	Height	Weight	Year	Previous school	Hometown
PG	0	T'Johnn Brown	5 ft 11 in (1.8 m)	164 lb (74 kg)	Jr	Kimball High School	Dallas, TX
SG	1	Javohn Garcia	6 ft 3 in (1.91 m)	183 lb (83 kg)	Sr	College of the Sequoias	Columbus, OH
SG	2	DJ Richards Jr.	6 ft 4 in (1.93 m)	185 lb (84 kg)	Sr	UTSA	Houston, TX
G	3	Garwey Dual	6 ft 5 in (1.96 m)	205 lb (93 kg)	Jr	Seton Hall	Houston, TX
G	6	Larry Johnson	6 ft 4 in (1.93 m)	200 lb (91 kg)	Fr	Creighton	Savannah, GA
F	7	Jerrell Colbert	6 ft 10 in (2.08 m)	235 lb (107 kg)	RS Sr	SMU	Houston, TX
G	8	Tyshawn Archie	6 ft 1 in (1.85 m)	165 lb (75 kg)	Jr	Tulsa	Houston, TX
G	9	JJ Rembert	5 ft 10 in (1.78 m)	155 lb (70 kg)	Fr	Cincinnati	Queens, NY
G/F	10	Jacolb Fredson-Cole	6 ft 7 in (2.01 m)	220 lb (100 kg)	RS So	Oklahoma	Bellaire, TX
G	11	Brewer Kaleb	6 ft 1 in (1.85 m)	180 lb (82 kg)	Fr	Link Prep	Waco, TX
F	13	Yanis Ndjonga	6 ft 8 in (2.03 m)	220 lb (100 kg)	RS Jr	Baylor	Yaoundé, Cameroon
G	14	Erik Villarreal	6 ft 3 in (1.91 m)	190 lb (86 kg)	Fr	Clear Lake High School	Houston, TX
F	13	Peitok Machar	6 ft 10 in (2.08 m)	215 lb (98 kg)	So	Triton College	Sydney, Australia
G	23	Carl Cherenfant	6 ft 5 in (1.96 m)	195 lb (88 kg)	Jr	New Mexico State	Pompano Beach, FL

Head coach

- Bill Armstrong (Baylor)

Assistant coach(es)

- Robi Coker (Fort Payne)
- LeBrent Walker (Florida A&M)
- Jeffery Armstrong (Southern Miss)

Legend

- (C) Team captain
- (S) Suspended
- (I) Ineligible
- (W) Walk-on
- Injured
- Current redshirt

Roster
Last update: November 28, 2025

== Schedule and results ==
Date time, TV	Rank^{#}	Opponent^{#}	Result	Record	High points	High rebounds	High assists	Site (attendance) city, state
Exhibition
October 26, 2025*; 3:00 p.m.		Grambling State	W 62–56		14 – Tied	11 – Johnson	2 – Tied	Townsley Law Arena; Lake Charles, LA
Regular season
November 3, 2025*; 6:30 p.m.		Champion Christian	W 127–65	1–0	30 – Johnson	11 – Ndjonga	6 – Fredson-Cole	Townsley Law Arena (2,587); Lake Charles, LA
November 7, 2025*; 9:00 p.m., ESPN+		at Santa Clara	L 67–79	1–1	18 – Johnson	9 – Fredson-Cole	4 – Fredson-Cole	Leavey Center (1,205); Santa Clara, CA
November 10, 2025*; 6:30 p.m., ESPN+		Biblical Studies	W 132–50	2–1	25 – Johnson	9 – Fredson-Cole	11 – Dual	Townsley Law Arena (2,736); Lake Charles, LA
November 14, 2025*; 6:00 p.m., ESPN+		Louisiana	W 88–62	3–1	24 – Johnson	6 – Fredson-Cole	7 – Dual	Townsley Law Arena (4,333); Lake Charles, LA
November 23, 2025*; 4:00 p.m., FloCollege		vs. George Washington; Cayman Islands Classic	W 92–86	4–1	18 – Garcia	14 – Machar	7 – Dual	John Gray Gymnasium (500); George Town, Cayman Islands
November 24, 2025*; 6:30 p.m., FloCollege		vs. Murray State; Cayman Islands Classic	W 73–60	5–1	17 – Archie	7 – Machar	6 – Garcia	John Gray Gymnasium; George Town, Cayman Islands
November 25, 2025*; 4:00 p.m., FloCollege		vs. Middle Tennessee; Cayman Islands Classic	W 72–62	6–1	26 – Garcia	10 – Cherenfant	2 – Tied	John Gray Gymnasium; George Town, Cayman Islands
December 1, 2025; 6:30 p.m., ESPN+		at Incarnate Word	L 67–71	6–2 (0–1)	18 – Dual	5 – Dual	1 – Tied	McDermott Center (1,003); San Antonio, TX
December 5, 2025; 6:30 p.m., ESPN+		Northwestern State	W 92–54	7–2 (1–1)	14 – Tied	8 – Johnson	6 – Johnson	Townsley Law Arena (3,255); Lake Charles, LA
December 9, 2025*; 6:00 p.m., ESPN+		at Rhode Island	W 66–64	8–2	18 – Archie	6 – Tied	4 – Dual	Ryan Center (3,419); Kingston, RI
December 12, 2025; 7:30 p.m., ESPN+		East Texas A&M	W 102–66	9–2 (2–1)	24 – Archie	8 – Johnson	6 – Tied	Townsley Law Arena (3,179); Lake Charles, LA
December 15, 2025; 7:00 p.m., ESPN+		at Houston Christian	W 78–68	10–2 (3–1)	22 – Johnson	7 – Colbert	5 – Dual	Sharp Gymnasium (803); Houston, TX
December 29, 2025*; 6:00 p.m., B1G+		at No. 2 Michigan	L 71–112	10–3	15 – Dual	7 – Johnson	3 – Dual	Crisler Center (12,707); Ann Arbor, MI
January 2, 2026; 6:00 p.m., CBSSN		Lamar; Battle of the Border	W 82–70	11–3 (4–1)	21 – Holifield	10 – East	4 – Wilhite	Townsley Law Arena (4,612); Lake Charles, LA
January 5, 2026; 6:30 p.m., ESPN+		Stephen F. Austin	W 66–64	12–3 (5–1)	15 – Patrick	11 – Christmas	5 – Patrick	Townsley Law Arena (2,784); Lake Charles, LA
January 10, 2026; 4:00 p.m., ESPN+		Southeastern Louisiana	W 73–61	13–3 (6–1)	13 – Edison	9 – Myles	5 – Pickett	Townsley Law Arena (3,112); Lake Charles, LA
January 12, 2026; 6:30 p.m., ESPN+		Nicholls	W 94–68	14–3 (7–1)	24 – Johnson	10 – Johnson	5 – Tied	Townsley Law Arena (3,073); Lake Charles, LA
January 17, 2026; 4:30 p.m., ESPN+		at UT Rio Grande Valley	L 76–79	14–4 (7–2)	23 – Archie	10 – Fredson-Cole	4 – Dual	UTRGV Fieldhouse (2,119); Edinburg, TX
January 19, 2026; 3:00 p.m., ESPN+		at Texas A&M–Corpus Christi	W 69–53	15–4 (8–2)	17 – Johnson	9 – Johnson	3 – Dual	Dugan Wellness Center (1,038); Corpus Christi, TX
January 24, 2026; 4:00 p.m., ESPN+		New Orleans	W 82–63	16–4 (9–2)	26 – Johnson	8 – Johnson	5 – Johnson	Townsley Law Arena (3,236); Lake Charles, LA
January 27, 2026; 6:00 p.m., ESPN+		at Southeastern Louisiana	W 76−66	17–4 (10–2)	20 – Johnson	7 – Ndjonga	3 – Dual	University Center (488); Hammond, LA
January 31, 2026; 6:00 p.m., ESPN+		at Lamar; Battle of the Border	W 64–63	18–4 (11–2)	22 – Johnson	12 – Colbert	3 – Archie	Neches Arena (5,714); Beaumont, TX
February 2, 2026; 6:00 p.m., ESPN+		at Stephen F. Austin	L 60–67	18–5 (11–3)	16 – Archie	11 – Colbert	6 – Archie	William R. Johnson Coliseum (5,687); Nacogdoches, TX
February 7, 2026; 4:00 p.m., ESPN+		Incarnate Word	W 81–64	19–5 (12–3)	17 – Tied	6 – Fredson-Cole	9 – Dual	Townsley Law Arena (3,554); Lake Charles, LA
February 9, 2026; 6:30 p.m., ESPN+		Houston Christian	W 73–69	20–5 (13–3)	18 – Garcia	5 – Colbert	5 – Archie	Townsley Law Arena (3,094); Lake Charles, LA
February 14, 2026; 5:00 p.m., ESPN+		at East Texas A&M	W 97–54	21–5 (14–3)	21 – Garcia	9 – Machar	5 – Dual	The Field House (502); Commerce, TX
February 16, 2026; 6:30 p.m., ESPN+		at Northwestern State	W 75–64	22–5 (15–3)	24 – Archie	7 – Machar	2 – Tied	Prather Coliseum (601); Natchitoches, LA
February 21, 2026; 7:00 p.m., ESPNU		Texas A&M–Corpus Christi	W 70–54	23–5 (16–3)	23 – Johnson	10 – Johnson	5 – Dual	Townsley Law Arena (3,298); Lake Charles, LA
February 23, 2026; 6:30 p.m., ESPN+		UT Rio Grande Valley	W 75–68	24–5 (17–3)	20 – Johnson	9 – Colbert	5 – Dual	Townsley Law Arena (2,872); Lake Charles, LA
February 28, 2026; 5:00 p.m., ESPN+		at New Orleans	W 66–63	25–5 (18–3)	17 – Tied	7 – Johnson	3 – Archie	Lakefront Arena (1,045); New Orleans, LA
March 2, 2026; 6:30 p.m., CBSSN		at Nicholls	W 75–65	26–5 (19–3)	25 – Johnson	6 – Johnson	5 – Archie	Stopher Gymnasium (912); Thibodaux, LA
Southland Conference tournament
March 10, 2026; 8:30 p.m., ESPN+	(2)	(3) UT Rio Grande Valley; Semifinal	W 84–80 ^{3OT}	27–5	27 – Johnson	12 – Johnson	10 – Dual	Townsley Law Arena (4,481); Lake Charles, LA
March 11, 2026; 4:00 p.m., ESPN2	(2)	(1) Stephen F. Austin; Championship	W 76–59	28–5	31 – Garcia	7 – Ndjonga	6 – Dual	Townsley Law Arena (5,272); Lake Charles, LA
NCAA tournament
March 19, 2026*; 2:15 pm, TruTV	(12 S)	vs. (5 S) No. 16 Vanderbilt; First round	L 68–78	28–6	16 – Dual	6 – Colbert	6 – Dual	Paycom Center (15,677); Oklahoma City, OK
*Non-conference game. ^{#}Rankings from AP poll. (#) Tournament seedings in parentheses. S=South. All times are in Central.
