= Matt Braeuer =

American basketball coach

Current position
- Title: Head coach
- Team: Stephen F. Austin
- Conference: Southland
- Record: 32–7 (.821)

Biographical details
- Born: April 23, 1986 (age 40); Austin, Texas, U.S.

Playing career
- 2004–2008: Wichita State

Coaching career (HC unless noted)
- 2008–2010: Wichita State (graduate assistant)
- 2010–2011: Midland College (assistant)
- 2013–2016: Sam Houston State (assistant)
- 2018–2023: North Texas (assistant)
- 2023–2025: Texas Tech (assistant)
- 2025–present: Stephen F. Austin

Administrative career (AD unless noted)
- 2011–2013: Maryland (video coordinator)
- 2016–2018: Charleston (DBO)

Head coaching record
- Overall: 32–7 (.821)
- Tournaments: 0–1 (NIT

Accomplishments and honors

Championships
- Southland regular season (2026)

Awards
- Southland Coach of the Year (2026)

Matt Braeuer (born April 23, 1986) is an American college basketball coach who is the head coach of the Stephen F. Austin Lumberjacks basketball team.

== Early life and playing career ==
Braeuer grew up in Belton, Texas and attended Belton High School, where he played baseball, basketball, and ran cross country. As a senior, he averaged 22.6 points per game and was named the District 13-5A MVP first-team All-State. He played college basketball at Wichita State, where he was a three-year starter at point guard.

== Coaching career ==
Braeuer began his coaching career as a graduate assistant at Wichita State after graduation in 2008. He then spent one season as an assistant coach at Midland College. Braeuer then took a position as a video coordinator with Maryland Terrapins men's basketball under his former head coach at Wichita State, Mark Turgeon, in 2011. He was hired as an assistant coach at Sam Houston State after 2 seasons working for the Terrapins in 2013.

Braeuer left Sam Houston State after 3 seasons to become the director of basketball operations at Charleston. In 2018 he joined Grant McCasland's staff at North Texas. Braeuer was hired as an assistant by McCasland when he became the head coach at Texas Tech.

Braeuer was hired as the head coach at Stephen F. Austin on March 7, 2025.

== Head coaching record ==
Record table
Season	Team	Overall	Conference	Standing	Postseason
Stephen F. Austin Lumberjacks (Southland Conference) (2025–present)
2025–26	Stephen F. Austin	28–6	20–2	1st	NIT First Round
2026–27	Stephen F. Austin	4–1	0-0		
Stephen F. Austin:		32–7 (.821)	20–2 (.909)		
Total:		32–7 (.821)			
National champion Postseason invitational champion Conference regular season champion Conference regular season and conference tournament champion Division regular season champion Division regular season and conference tournament champion Conference tournament champion
