= 2025–26 Northwestern State Demons basketball team =

American college basketball season

2025–26 Northwestern State Demons basketball
- Conference: Southland Conference
- Record: 10–22 (8–14 Southland)
- Head coach: Rick Cabrera (3rd season)
- Associate head coach: Anthony Figueroa
- Assistant coaches: Luke Darst; Hayden Harkins
- Home arena: Prather Coliseum

2025–26 Southland Conference men's basketball standings
	Conf.				Overall
Team	W		L	PCT	W		L	PCT
Stephen F. Austin	20	–	2	.909	27	–	4	.871
McNeese	19	–	3	.864	26	–	5	.839
UT Rio Grande Valley	14	–	8	.636	18	–	13	.581
Texas A&M–Corpus Christi	13	–	9	.591	17	–	14	.548
New Orleans	12	–	10	.545	15	–	17	.469
Nicholls	12	–	10	.545	14	–	18	.438
Northwestern State	8	–	14	.364	10	–	22	.313
Houston Christian	8	–	14	.364	12	–	20	.375
Incarnate Word	7	–	15	.318	12	–	19	.387
Lamar	7	–	15	.318	12	–	19	.387
East Texas A&M	6	–	16	.273	11	–	21	.344
Southeastern Louisiana	6	–	16	.273	9	–	22	.290
† 2026 Southland tournament winner As of March 8, 2026

The 2025–26 Northwestern State Demons basketball team represented Northwestern State University during the 2025–26 NCAA Division I men's basketball season. The Demons, led by third-year head coach Rick Cabrera, played their home games at Prather Coliseum in Natchitoches, Louisiana as members of the Southland Conference.

== Previous season ==
The Demons finished the 2024–25 season 16–16, 12–8 in Southland Conference play, to finish in a three-way tie for fourth place. They defeated Texas A&M–Corpus Christi, before falling to top-seeded and eventual tournament champions McNeese in the semifinals of the Southland Conference tournament.

== Roster ==
2025–26 Northwestern State Demons men's basketball team
Players
Coaches

Pos.	#	Name	Height	Weight	Year	Previous school	Hometown
G	0	Izzy Miles	6 ft 2 in (1.88 m)	190 lb (86 kg)	Jr	Tarleton State	Huntsville, Alabama
G	1	Chip Brunt	6 ft 5 in (1.96 m)	165 lb (75 kg)	Jr	Gulf Coast State	Memphis, Tennessee
G	3	Landyn Jumawan	6 ft 4 in (1.93 m)	190 lb (86 kg)	Sr	Lee College	Whitmore Village, Hawaii
PG	4	CJ Larry	6 ft 3 in (1.91 m)	180 lb (82 kg)	Fr	Jonesboro High School	Jonesboro, Arkansas
G	5	Micah Thomas	6 ft 0 in (1.83 m)	165 lb (75 kg)	Sr	Nicholls	Oklahoma City, Oklahoma
F	8	Moustapha Loum	6 ft 10 in (2.08 m)	220 lb (100 kg)	So	Frank Phillips College	Dakar, Senegal
F	10	Kordrick Turner	6 ft 6 in (1.98 m)	240 lb (109 kg)	Jr	Paris Junior College	Sulphur Springs, Texas
G	11	Chris Mubiru	6 ft 5 in (1.96 m)	199 lb (90 kg)	Jr	West Oaks Academy	Philadelphia, Pennsylvania
G	13	Justin Redmond	6 ft 2 in (1.88 m)	170 lb (77 kg)	So	DME Academy	Snellville, Georgia
G	15	Seth Ned	5 ft 10 in (1.78 m)	165 lb (75 kg)	Fr	Hamilton Christian Academy	Westlake, Louisiana
C	21	J.C. Riley Jr.	6 ft 10 in (2.08 m)	250 lb (113 kg)	RS Jr	Tallahassee State College	Atlanta, Georgia
F	23	Willie Williams	6 ft 6 in (1.98 m)	235 lb (107 kg)	Sr	Kilgore College	Houston, Texas
G	25	Omar Adegbola	6 ft 4 in (1.93 m)	205 lb (93 kg)	RS So	Baylor	Houston, Texas
G	33	Quentin Bolton	6 ft 6 in (1.98 m)	220 lb (100 kg)	Sr	Arkansas–Pine Bluff	Racine, Wisconsin

Head coach

- Rick Cabrera (Tennessee Tech)

Assistant coach(es)

- Anthony Figueroa (Millikin)
- Luke Darst (Arkansas State)
- Hayden Harkins (Elmira)

Legend

- (C) Team captain
- (S) Suspended
- (I) Ineligible
- (W) Walk-on
- Injured
- Current redshirt

Roster
Last update: December 1, 2025

== Schedule and results ==
Date time, TV	Rank^{#}	Opponent^{#}	Result	Record	High points	High rebounds	High assists	Site (attendance) city, state
Regular season
November 3, 2025*; 7:00 pm, SECN+		at Texas A&M	L 68–98	0–1	28 – Thomas	7 – Mubiru	4 – Redmond	Reed Arena (7,517); College Station, TX
November 6, 2025*; 7:00 pm, ESPN+		at North Texas	L 53–80	0–2	9 – Redmond	4 – Turner	2 – Jumawan	The Super Pit (3,030); Denton, TX
November 11, 2025*; 6:00 pm, ESPN+		at North Alabama	L 83–87 ^{OT}	0–3	29 – Thomas	6 – Turner	2 – Tied	CB&S Bank Arena (2,378); Florence, AL
November 14, 2025*; 12:00 pm, ESPN+		Ecclesia	W 95–75	1−3	21 – Adegbola	5 – Tied	4 – Redmond	Prather Coliseum (904); Natchitoches, LA
November 18, 2025*; 9:00 pm, ESPN+		at San Francisco; West Coast MTE	L 64–84	1−4	13 – Jumawan	5 – Turner	4 – Thomas	Sobrato Center (1,280); San Francisco, CA
November 21, 2025*; 8:00 pm, MWN		at Grand Canyon; West Coast MTE	L 72–85	1–5	24 – Thomas	3 – Tied	4 – Thomas	Global Credit Union Arena (7,224); Phoenix, AZ
November 29, 2025*; 1:00 pm, ESPN+		Southern	L 73–75	1–6	15 – Thomas	9 – Williams	4 – Mubiru	Prather Coliseum (304); Natchitoches, LA
December 5, 2025; 6:30 pm, ESPN+		at McNeese	L 54–92	1–7 (0–1)	15 – Redmond	5 – Williams	4 – Tied	Townsley Law Arena (3,255); Lake Charles, LA
December 7, 2025; 3:30 pm, ESPN+		at Southeastern Louisiana	W 76–68	2–7 (1–1)	18 – Thomas	7 – Williams	3 – Mubiru	University Center (331); Hammond, LA
December 13, 2025*; 4:00 pm, ACCNX		at California	L 70–79	2–8	22 – Miles	8 – Williams	5 – Thomas	Haas Pavilion (2,738); Berkeley, CA
December 20, 2025*; 1:00 pm, ESPN+		Southern–New Orleans	W 108–55	3–8	20 – Tied	13 – Loum	4 – Tied	Prather Coliseum (289); Natchitoches, LA
December 29, 2025; 6:30 pm, ESPN+		Lamar	L 61–76	3–9 (1–2)	17 – Miles	4 – Williams	6 – Mubiru	Prather Coliseum (302); Natchitoches, LA
December 31, 2025; 3:30 pm, ESPN+		Stephen F. Austin	L 64–74	3–10 (1–3)	15 – Mubiru	11 – Williams	2 – Thomas	Prather Coliseum (301); Natchitoches, LA
January 3, 2026; 3:30 pm, ESPN+		New Orleans	W 74–68	4–10 (2–3)	16 – Mubiru	13 – Williams	4 – Thomas	Prather Coliseum (353); Natchitoches, LA
January 5, 2026; 6:30 pm, ESPN+		at Nicholls	L 72–74	4–11 (2–4)	29 – Thomas	12 – Williams	4 – Williams	Stopher Gymnasium (511); Thibodaux, LA
January 10, 2026; 3:30 pm, ESPN+		Texas A&M–Corpus Christi	W 79–78	5–11 (3–4)	20 – Thomas	8 – Williams	3 – Williams	Prather Coliseum (812); Natchitoches, LA
January 12, 2026; 6:30 pm, ESPN+		UT Rio Grande Valley	W 64–63	6–11 (4–4)	17 – Thomas	8 – Williams	5 – Thomas	Prather Coliseum (810); Natchitoches, LA
January 17, 2026; 4:00 pm, ESPN+		at Incarnate Word	L 74–76	6–12 (4–5)	20 – Miles	9 – Williams	4 – Thomas	McDermott Center; San Antonio, TX
January 19, 2026; 7:00 pm, ESPN+		at Houston Christian	L 80–82	6–13 (4–6)	17 – Thomas	3 – Tied	4 – Thomas	Sharp Gymnasium (985); Houston, TX
January 27, 2026; 3:00 pm, CBSSN/ESPN+		at Stephen F. Austin	L 67-69	6−14 (4−7)	19 – Brunt	11 – Williams	5 – Thomas	William R. Johnson Coliseum (4,675); Nacogdoches, TX
January 31, 2026; 5:00 pm, ESPN+		at New Orleans	L 64–75	6–15 (4–8)	20 – Thomas	6 – Tied	5 – Williams	Lakefront Arena (793); New Orleans, LA
February 2, 2026; 6:30 pm, ESPN+		Nicholls	L 58–61	6–16 (4–9)	16 – Mubiru	12 – Williams	4 – Williams	Prather Coliseum (1,000); Natchitoches, LA
February 4, 2026; 6:30 pm, ESPN+		East Texas A&M	L 68–74	6–17 (4–10)	23 – Thomas	8 – Williams	4 – Redmond	Prather Coliseum (404); Natchitoches, LA
February 7, 2026; 5:00 pm, ESPN+		at East Texas A&M	L 48–52	6–18 (4–11)	10 – Williams	15 – Williams	2 – Tied	The Field House (446); Commerce, TX
February 9, 2026; 6:00 pm, ESPN+		at Lamar	W 70–68	7–18 (5–11)	14 – Tied	10 – Williams	6 – Larry	Neches Arena (1,092); Beaumont, TX
February 14, 2026; 3:30 pm, ESPN+		Southeastern Louisiana	W 69–66	8–18 (6–11)	26 – Thomas	6 – Williams	5 – Mubiru	Prather Coliseum (515); Natchitoches, LA
February 16, 2026; 6:30 pm, ESPN+		McNeese	L 64–75	8–19 (6–12)	27 – Thomas	8 – Mubiru	2 – Tied	Prather Coliseum (601); Natchitoches, LA
February 21, 2026; 3:30 pm, ESPN+		Houston Christian	W 71–53	9–19 (7–12)	23 – Thomas	10 – Williams	2 – Larry	Prather Coliseum (450); Natchitoches, LA
February 23, 2026; 6:30 pm, ESPN+		Incarnate Word	W 54–49	10–19 (8–12)	18 – Thomas	9 – Mubiru	2 – Tied	Prather Coliseum (601); Natchitoches, LA
February 28, 2026; 5:30 pm, ESPN+		at Texas A&M–Corpus Christi	W 63–55	17–13 (13–8)	14 – Gomez	9 – Brankovic	4 – Tied	Hilliard Center (1,723); Corpus Christi, TX
March 2, 2026; 6:30 pm, ESPN+		at UT Rio Grande Valley	L 62–74	10–21 (8–14)	21 – Cotton	7 – Cotton	8 – Washington	UTRGV Fieldhouse (1,717); Edinburg, TX
Southland tournament
March 8, 2026; 7:30 pm, ESPN+	(7)	vs. (6) Nicholls; First round	L 47–61	10–22	14 – Miles	11 – Williams	3 – Mubiru	Townsley Law Arena (2,835); Lake Charles, LA
*Non-conference game. ^{#}Rankings from AP Poll. (#) Tournament seedings in parentheses. All times are in Central.
