= 2025–26 Houston Christian Huskies men's basketball team =

American college basketball season

2025–26 Houston Christian Huskies men's basketball
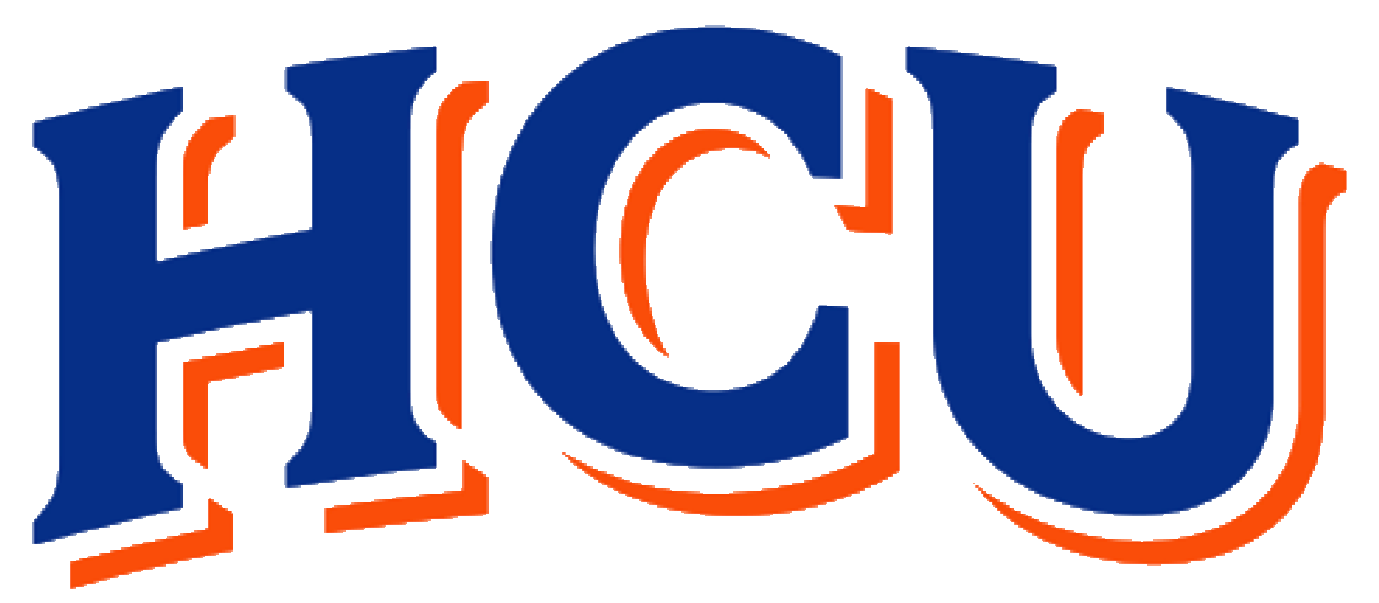
- Conference: Southland Conference
- Record: 12–20 (8–14 Southland)
- Head coach: Craig Doty (2nd season)
- Associate head coach: Evan Lavery
- Assistant coaches: Adam Cytlak; Terry Johnson; Caden Brannan
- Home arena: Sharp Gymnasium

2025–26 Southland Conference men's basketball standings
	Conf.				Overall
Team	W		L	PCT	W		L	PCT
Stephen F. Austin	20	–	2	.909	27	–	4	.871
McNeese	19	–	3	.864	26	–	5	.839
UT Rio Grande Valley	14	–	8	.636	18	–	13	.581
Texas A&M–Corpus Christi	13	–	9	.591	17	–	14	.548
New Orleans	12	–	10	.545	15	–	17	.469
Nicholls	12	–	10	.545	14	–	18	.438
Northwestern State	8	–	14	.364	10	–	22	.313
Houston Christian	8	–	14	.364	12	–	20	.375
Incarnate Word	7	–	15	.318	12	–	19	.387
Lamar	7	–	15	.318	12	–	19	.387
East Texas A&M	6	–	16	.273	11	–	21	.344
Southeastern Louisiana	6	–	16	.273	9	–	22	.290
† 2026 Southland tournament winner As of March 8, 2026

The 2025–26 Houston Christian Huskies men's basketball team represented Houston Christian University during the 2025–26 NCAA Division I men's basketball season. The Huskies, led by second-year head coach Craig Doty, played their home games at Sharp Gymnasium in Houston, Texas as members of the Southland Conference.

== Previous season ==
The Huskies finished the 2024–25 season 12–20, 9–11 in Southland Conference play, to finish in a tie for seventh place. They were defeated by Texas A&M–Corpus Christi in the first round of the Southland Conference tournament.

== Roster ==
2025–26 Houston Christian Huskies men's basketball team
Players
Coaches

Pos.	#	Name	Height	Weight	Year	Previous school	Hometown
G/F	0	Demari Williams	6 ft 5 in (1.96 m)	221 lb (100 kg)	RS Jr	Oral Roberts	Fulshear, Texas
G	1	Ryan Bartley	6 ft 6 in (1.98 m)	182 lb (83 kg)	GS	Malone	Decatur, Illinois
G	2	Will Wilson	6 ft 3 in (1.91 m)	215 lb (98 kg)	Sr	Western Washington	Lorton, Virginia
G	3	Kylin Green	6 ft 0 in (1.83 m)	170 lb (77 kg)	Sr	Utah Valley	Lewisville, Texas
G	4	Elijah Brooks	6 ft 3 in (1.91 m)	195 lb (88 kg)	Sr	North Dakota	Topeka, Kansas
G	5	D'Aundre Samuels	6 ft 2 in (1.88 m)	186 lb (84 kg)	Jr	Nebraska–Kearney	Denver, Colorado
F	7	Nehikhare Igiehon	6 ft 7 in (2.01 m)	225 lb (102 kg)	Sr	Henderson State	Austin, Texas
F	8	Trent Johnson	6 ft 6 in (1.98 m)	197 lb (89 kg)	GS	Idaho State	Cambridge, Ontario
G	9	Obadiah Curtis	6 ft 4 in (1.93 m)	205 lb (93 kg)	Sr	Eastern Illinois	Fresno, California
F	10	Caleb Gaston	6 ft 7 in (2.01 m)	220 lb (100 kg)	Jr	Howard College	San Antonio, Texas
F	13	Ahjany Lee	6 ft 8 in (2.03 m)	217 lb (98 kg)	RS Jr	St. Thomas (MN)	Byron, Minnesota
F	21	Mambourou Mara	6 ft 6 in (1.98 m)	209 lb (95 kg)	Jr	North Dakota	Conakry, Guinea
F	23	Demarco Bethea	6 ft 7 in (2.01 m)	210 lb (95 kg)	Sr	East Texas A&M	Sellers, South Carolina
G	24	Bryson Monroe	6 ft 1 in (1.85 m)	190 lb (86 kg)	Sr	Howard Payne	Brownwood, Texas
F	32	Brennen Byrd	6 ft 6 in (1.98 m)	205 lb (93 kg)	Fr	Faith Christian School	Coppell, Texas

Head coach

- Craig Doty (Morningside)

Assistant coach(es)

- Evan Lavery (Central Methodist)
- Adam Cytlak (Ohio Dominican)
- Terry Johnson (Stanislaus State)
- Caden Brannan (Emporia State)

Legend

- (C) Team captain
- (S) Suspended
- (I) Ineligible
- (W) Walk-on
- Injured
- Current redshirt

Roster
Last update: November 30, 2025

== Schedule and results ==
Date time, TV	Rank^{#}	Opponent^{#}	Result	Record	High points	High rebounds	High assists	Site (attendance) city, state
Exhibition
October 20, 2025*; 6:00 pm		at Southern Miss	W 69–64	–	18 – Green	6 – Green	6 – Green	Reed Green Coliseum; Hattiesburg, MS
Regular season
November 3, 2025*; 7:00 pm, ESPN+		Southern Arkansas	W 74–70	1–0	17 – Green	7 – Johnson	9 – Green	Sharp Gymnasium (546); Houston, TX
November 8, 2025*; 9:00 pm, ESPN+		at UC San Diego	L 60–78	1–1	12 – Samuels	5 – Tied	4 – Johnson	LionTree Arena (3,614); La Jolla, CA
November 13, 2025*; 7:00 pm, ESPN+		Louisiana–Monroe	W 72–61	2–1	17 – Johnson	6 – Tied	13 – Green	Sharp Gymnasium (664); Houston, TX
November 20, 2025*; 7:00 pm, ESPN+		Biblical Studies	W 85−67	3−1	17 – Johnson	8 – Tied	5 – Green	Sharp Gymnasium (349); Houston, TX
November 25, 2025*; 6:00 pm		vs. Bellarmine; The Citadel MTE	L 69−74	3−2	24 – Green	6 – Tied	3 – Brooks	McAlister Field House (203); Charleston, SC
November 26, 2025*; 6:00 pm, ESPN+		at The Citadel; The Citadel MTE	W 72–65	4–2	14 – Bethea	8 – Brooks	5 – Green	McAlister Field House (837); Charleston, SC
November 29, 2025*; 1:00 pm, ESPN+		at Georgia Southern	L 62–80	4–3	12 – Brooks	6 – Bartley	4 – Green	Hill Convocation Center (1,116); Statesboro, GA
December 2, 2025*; 7:00 pm, ESPN+		at North Texas	L 75−77	4−4	13 – Green	4 – Tied	4 – Tied	The Super Pit (2,582); Denton, TX
December 6, 2025; 5:00 pm, ESPN+		at New Orleans	W 85–76	5–4 (1–0)	18 – Brooks	9 – Bethea	9 – Green	Lakefront Arena (1,741); New Orleans, LA
December 13, 2025; 3:30 pm, ESPN+		Southeastern Louisiana	L 71–74	5–5 (1–1)	17 – Tied	9 – Green	10 – Green	Sharp Gymnasium (474); Houston, TX
December 15, 2025; 7:00 pm, ESPN+		McNeese	L 68–78	5–6 (1–2)	14 – Bartley	8 – Williams	5 – Tied	Sharp Gymnasium (803); Houston, TX
December 17, 2025; 6:30 pm, ESPN+		at Nicholls	L 64–79	5–7 (1–3)	15 – Green	8 – Johnson	3 – Johnson	Stopher Gymnasium (544); Thibodaux, LA
December 29, 2025*; 7:00 pm, ESPN+		at No. 3 Iowa State	L 61–89	5–8	19 – Williams	5 – Williams	3 – Bethea	Hilton Coliseum (14,267); Ames, IA
January 3, 2026; 4:00 pm, ESPN+		at Incarnate Word	L 56-73	5-9 (1-4)	22 – Williams	. 6 – Williams	4 – Green	McDermott Center (201); San Antonio, TX
January 5, 2025; 7:00 pm, ESPN+		Texas A&M–Corpus Christi	L 65-81	5-10 (1-5)	15 – Green	5 – Samuels	4 – Tied	Sharp Gymnasium (473); Houston, TX
January 10, 2026; 5:00 pm, ESPN+		at Stephen F. Austin	L 67-85	5-11 (1-6)	15 – Williams	7 – Samuels	5 – Samuels	William R. Johnson Coliseum (1,624); Nacogdoches, TX
January 12, 2026; 6:00 pm, ESPN+		at Lamar	L 56-64	5-12 (1-7)	15 – Green	7 – Williams	5 – Williams	Neches Arena (982); Beaumont, TX
January 17, 2026; 3:30 pm, ESPN+		East Texas A&M	W 81-70	6-12 (2-7)	19 – Johnson	8 – Bethea	6 – Tied	Sharp Gymnasium (788); Houston, TX
January 19, 2026; 7:00 pm, ESPN+		Northwestern State	W 82-80	7-12 (3-7)	16 – Williams	7 – Samuels	10 – Green	Sharp Gymnasium (985); Houston, TX
January 24, 2026; 3:30 pm, ESPN+		UT Rio Grande Valley	L 51-68	7-13 (3-8)	14 – Bethea	10 – Bethea	8 – Johnson	Sharp Gymnasium (798); Houston, TX
January 27, 2026; 7:00 pm, ESPN+		Incarnate Word	W 81−75	8−13 (4−8)	24 – Williams	8 – Bethea	6 – Green	Sharp Gymnasium (781); Houston, TX
January 31, 2026; 3:30 pm, ESPN+		at Texas A&M–Corpus Christi	L 71-73	8-14 (4-9)	17 – Tied	6 – Bethea	3 – Green	Hilliard Center (1,914); Corpus Christi, TX
February 2, 2026; 6:30 pm, ESPN+		at UT Rio Grande Valley	L 57-74	8-15 (4-10)	18 – Williams	6 – Samuels	4 – Green	UTRGV Fieldhouse (1,357); Edinburg, TX
February 7, 2026; 3:30 pm, ESPN+		at Southeastern Louisiana	L 47-55	8-16 (4-11)	12 – Mara	7 – Bethea	3 – Johnson	Pride Roofing University Center (357); Hammond, LA
February 9, 2026; 6:30 pm, ESPN+		at McNeese	L 69-73	8-17 (4-12)	16 – Williams	7 – Bethea	4 – Samuels	Townsley Law Arena (3,094); Lake Charles, LA
February 14, 2026; 3:30 pm, ESPN+		New Orleans	W 61–60	9–17 (5–12)	15 – Samuels	7 – Williams	6 – Green	Sharp Gymnasium (706); Houston, TX
February 16, 2026; 7:00 pm, ESPN+		Nicholls	W 72–68	10–17 (6–12)	15 – Tied	13 – Mara	6 – Green	Sharp Gymnasium (901); Houston, TX
February 21, 2026; 3:30 pm, ESPN+		at Northwestern State	L 53–71	10–18 (6–13)	15 – Green	7 – Bethea	2 – Samuels	Prather Coliseum (450); Natchitoches, LA
February 23, 2026; 6:30 pm, ESPN+		at East Texas A&M	W 69–68	11–18 (7–13)	15 – Bethea	9 – Bethea	5 – Green	The Field House (438); Commerce, TX
February 28, 2026; 3:30 pm, ESPN+		Stephen F. Austin	L 56–77	11–19 (7–14)	9 – Tied	8 – Johnson	5 – Johnson	Sharp Gymnasium (789); Houston, TX
March 2, 2026; 7:30 pm, ESPN+		Lamar	W 75–53	12–19 (8–14)	15 – Bartley	8 – Green	5 – Green	Sharp Gymnasium (843); Houston, TX
Southland tournament
March 8, 2026; 5:00 pm, ESPN+	(8)	vs. (5) New Orleans; First round	L 60–73	12–20	20 – Samuels	6 – Mara	4 – Green	Townsley Law Arena; Lake Charles, LA
*Non-conference game. ^{#}Rankings from AP Poll. (#) Tournament seedings in parentheses. All times are in Central.
