= 2025–26 Southeastern Louisiana Lions basketball team =

American college basketball season

2025–26 Southeastern Louisiana Lions basketball
- Conference: Southland Conference
- Record: 9–22 (6–16 Southland)
- Head coach: David Kiefer (7th season)
- Associate head coach: Kyle Roane
- Assistant coaches: Cody McCoy; Drew Riley
- Home arena: University Center (Capacity: 7,500)

2025–26 Southland Conference men's basketball standings
	Conf.				Overall
Team	W		L	PCT	W		L	PCT
Stephen F. Austin	20	–	2	.909	27	–	4	.871
McNeese	19	–	3	.864	26	–	5	.839
UT Rio Grande Valley	14	–	8	.636	18	–	13	.581
Texas A&M–Corpus Christi	13	–	9	.591	17	–	14	.548
New Orleans	12	–	10	.545	14	–	17	.452
Nicholls	12	–	10	.545	13	–	18	.419
Northwestern State	8	–	14	.364	10	–	21	.323
Houston Christian	8	–	14	.364	12	–	19	.387
Incarnate Word	7	–	15	.318	12	–	19	.387
Lamar	7	–	15	.318	12	–	19	.387
East Texas A&M	6	–	16	.273	11	–	21	.344
Southeastern Louisiana	6	–	16	.273	9	–	22	.290
† 2026 Southland tournament winner As of March 2, 2026

The 2025–26 Southeastern Louisiana Lions basketball team represented Southeastern Louisiana University in the 2025–26 NCAA Division I men's basketball season. The Lions, led by seventh-year head coach David Kiefer, played their home games at the University Center in Hammond, Louisiana as members of the Southland Conference.

== Previous season ==
The Lions finished the 2024–25 season 18–12 overall and 12–8 in Southland Conference play to finish in a three-way tie for fifth in conference. They lost against Incarnate Word in the first round.

== Roster ==
2025–26 Southeastern Louisiana Lions men's basketball team
Players
Coaches

Pos.	#	Name	Height	Weight	Year	Previous school	Hometown
F	0	Jeremy Elyzee	6 ft 7 in (2.01 m)	205 lb (93 kg)	So	Pembroke Pines Charter HS	Hialeah, FL
F	1	Makhi Myles	6 ft 7 in (2.01 m)	200 lb (91 kg)	So	Starkville HS; UAB	Starkville, MS
G	2	Jalen Forrest	6 ft 4 in (1.93 m)	225 lb (102 kg)	Sr	Greenforest-McCalep Christian; Chicago State	Decatur, GA
G	3	Ethan Pickett	6 ft 5 in (1.96 m)	205 lb (93 kg)	RS Sr	Cherokee HS; Triton College; UIC	Pensacola, FL
PG	4	CJ Booker	5 ft 10 in (1.78 m)	150 lb (68 kg)	RS Jr	Seguin HS; UT Rio Grande Valley	Arlington, TX
G	5	Kyle Edison	6 ft 3 in (1.91 m)	190 lb (86 kg)	Jr	St. John Paul II Catholic HS	West Palm Beach, FL
C	6	Etim Ubong-Abasi	6 ft 9 in (2.06 m)	235 lb (107 kg)	Sr	North Little Rock HS; Bowling Green; Central Arkansas	Richmond, CA
G	7	Seth Jones-Crump	6 ft 1 in (1.85 m)	178 lb (81 kg)	Sr	Dickinson HS; Tallahassee CC; Pacific	Dickinson, TX
G	8	Peter Hemschemeier	6 ft 5 in (1.96 m)	195 lb (88 kg)	Fr	Eisbären Bremerhaven	Paderborn, Germany
G	9	Cody Al-Naziat	6 ft 2 in (1.88 m)	173 lb (78 kg)	Fr	Ponchatoula HS	Hammond, LA
F	10	Jaiden Lawrence	6 ft 4 in (1.93 m)	195 lb (88 kg)	Sr	Warren Central HS; Panola College	Bowling Green, KY
PG	11	Amir Chaney	5 ft 10 in (1.78 m)	185 lb (84 kg)	Fr	Zachary HS	Hammond, LA
G	12	Ahmed Essahaty	6 ft 3 in (1.91 m)	190 lb (86 kg)	Sr	Onslow College; LIU	Wellington, New Zealand
F	23	Isaiah Gaines	6 ft 8 in (2.03 m)	230 lb (104 kg)	RS Sr	Pensacola HS; Florida Atlantic; Radford	Pensacola, FL
F	32	Garrett Shoemaker	6 ft 9 in (2.06 m)	200 lb (91 kg)	RS Fr	Oak Forest Academy	Livingston, LA

Head coach

- David Kiefer (Kansas State)

Assistant coach(es)

- Kyle Roane (Southern Miss)
- Cody McCoy (UT Arlington)
- Drew Riley (Arkansas State)

Legend

- (C) Team captain
- (S) Suspended
- (I) Ineligible
- (W) Walk-on
- Injured
- Current redshirt

Roster
Last update: October 6, 2025

== Schedule and results ==
Date time, TV	Rank^{#}	Opponent^{#}	Result	Record	High points	High rebounds	High assists	Site (attendance) city, state
Exhibition
October 29, 2025*; 6:00 p.m.		Mississippi College	W 101–83		–	–	–	University Center (223); Hammond, LA
Regular season
November 3, 2025*; 7:00 p.m., SECN+		at Ole Miss	L 58–88	0–1	15 – Lawrence	5 – Gaines	3 – Hemschemeier	SJB Pavilion (8,883); Oxford, MS
November 7, 2025*; 7:30 p.m., ESPN+		at Louisiana	L 52–58	0–2	14 – Forrest	8 – Lawrence	3 – Tied	Cajundome (3,304); Lafayette, LA
November 10, 2025*; 8:00 p.m., ACCN		at Georgia Tech	L 60–70	0–3	12 – Gaines	6 – Gaines	3 – Elyzee	McCamish Pavilion (4,585); Atlanta, GA
November 15, 2025*; 2:00 p.m., SECN+		at Mississippi State	L 68–75	0–4	19 – Elyzee	7 – Elyzee	6 – Elyzee	Humphrey Coliseum (7,401); Starkville, MS
November 19, 2025*; 6:00 p.m., ESPN+		William Carey	W 71–45	1–4	14 – Jones	7 – Tied	4 – Tied	University Center (432); Hammond, LA
November 26, 2025*; 6:00 p.m., FloSports		at UNC Wilmington; Live Oak Bank Holiday Classic	L 57–70	1–5	21 – Elyzee	4 – Tied	3 – Gaines	Trask Coliseum (4,246); Wilmington, NC
November 28, 2025*; 11:00 a.m., FloSports		vs. Gardner–Webb; Live Oak Bank Holiday Classic	W 76–68	2–5	18 – Jones	9 – Gaines	5 – Pickett	Trask Coliseum; Wilmington, NC
November 29, 2025*; 11:00 a.m., FloSports		vs. Navy; Live Oak Bank Holiday Classic	W 69–65	3–5	19 – Hemschemeier	7 – Jones	3 – Tied	Trask Coliseum; Wilmington, NC
December 7, 2025; 3:30 p.m., ESPN+		Northwestern State	L 68–76	3–6 (0–1)	19 – Elyzee	7 – Gaines	2 – Tied	University Center (331); Hammond, LA
December 13, 2025; 3:30 p.m., ESPN+		at Houston Christian	W 74–71	4–6 (1–1)	17 – Elyzee	7 – Elyzee	3 – Booker	Sharp Gymnasium (474); Houston, TX
December 15, 2025; 6:00 p.m., ESPN+		East Texas A&M	L 69–70	4–7 (1–2)	17 – Gaines	9 – Elyzee	4 – Tied	University Center (371); Hammond, LA
December 19, 2025*; 7:00 p.m., SECN+		at LSU	L 65–78	4–8	15 – Tied	6 – Myles	3 – Hemschemeier	Pete Maravich Assembly Center (7,479); Baton Rouge, LA
December 30, 2025; 5:00 p.m., ESPN+		at Incarnate Word	L 70−79	4−9 (1−3)	15 – Gaines	9 – Pickett	2 – Tied	McDermott Center (104); San Antonio, TX
January 3, 2026; 3:30 p.m., ESPN+		Stephen F. Austin	L 63–73	4–10 (1–4)	20 – Myles	7 – Gaines	4 – Hemschemeier	University Center (403); Hammond, LA
January 5, 2026; 6:00 p.m., ESPN+		Lamar	W 60–52	5–10 (2–4)	9 – Tied	5 – Tied	5 – Pickett	University Center (388); Hammond, LA
January 10, 2026; 4:00 p.m., ESPN+		at McNeese	L 61–73	5–11 (2–5)	13 – Edison	9 – Myles	5 – Pickett	The Legacy Center (3,112); Lake Charles, LA
January 12, 2026; 6:00 p.m., ESPN+		New Orleans	L 76–79	5–12 (2–6)	18 – Gaines	11 – Gaines	3 – Elyzee	University Center (415); Hammond, LA
January 17, 2026; 3:30 p.m., ESPN+		at Texas A&M–Corpus Christi	L 56–68	5–13 (2–7)	18 – Gaines	6 – Gaines	4 – Hemschemeier	American Bank Center (2,011); Corpus Christi, TX
January 19, 2026; 6:30 p.m., ESPN+		at UT Rio Grande Valley	L 65–68	5–14 (2–8)	14 – Elyzee	11 – Gaines	5 – Pickett	UTRGV Fieldhouse (937); Edinburg, TX
January 24, 2026; 3:30 p.m., ESPN+		Nicholls	W 67–61	6–14 (3–8)	18 – Hemschemeier	13 – Gaines	3 – Hemschemeier	University Center (564); Hammond, LA
January 27, 2026; 6:00 p.m., ESPN+		McNeese	L 66−76	6−15 (3−9)	16 – Myles	7 – Myles	2 – Tied	University Center (488); Hammond, LA
January 31, 2026; 5:00 p.m., ESPN+		at Stephen F. Austin	L 58–85	6–16 (3–10)	15 – Forrest	6 – Elyzee	2 – Tied	William R. Johnson Coliseum (3,946); Nacogdoches, TX
February 2, 2026; 6:00 p.m., ESPN+		at Lamar	L 54–73	6–17 (3–11)	15 – Booker	9 – Gaines	3 – Tied	Neches Arena (1,237); Beaumont, TX
February 7, 2026; 3:30 p.m., ESPN+		Houston Christian	W 55–47	7–17 (4–11)	12 – Tied	6 – Elyzee	5 – Gaines	University Center (357); Hammond, LA
February 9, 2026; 6:00 p.m., ESPN+		Incarnate Word	W 74–62	8–17 (5–11)	20 – Myles	9 – Gaines	5 – Booker	University Center (439); Hammond, LA
February 14, 2026; 3:30 p.m., ESPN+		at Northwestern State	L 66–69	8–18 (5–12)	26 – Forrest	7 – Gaines	3 – Gaines	Prather Coliseum (515); Natchitoches, LA
February 16, 2026; 1:00 p.m., ESPN+		at East Texas A&M	L 53−70	8−19 (5−13)	13 – Forrest	10 – Gaines	2 – Tied	The Field House (333); Commerce, TX
February 21, 2026; 3:30 p.m., ESPN+		UT Rio Grande Valley	L 75–96	8–20 (5–14)	24 – Gaines	7 – Gaines	7 – Booker	University Center (422); Hammond, LA
February 23, 2026; 6:00 p.m., ESPN+		Texas A&M–Corpus Christi	L 68–73	8–21 (5–15)	17 – Pickett	5 – Tied	3 – Booker	University Center (410); Hammond, LA
February 28, 2026; 3:00 p.m., ESPN+		at Nicholls	L 60–68	8–22 (5–16)	12 – Booker	7 – Myles	4 – Booker	Stopher Gymnasium (833); Thibodaux, LA
March 2, 2026; 7:00 p.m., ESPN+		at New Orleans	W 82–78	9–22 (6–16)	23 – Elyzee	6 – Tied	5 – Booker	Lakefront Arena (1,162); New Orleans, LA
*Non-conference game. ^{#}Rankings from AP Poll. (#) Tournament seedings in parentheses. All times are in Central.

== See also ==
- 2025–26 Southeastern Louisiana Lady Lions basketball team
