= 2025–26 Nicholls Colonels men's basketball team =

American college basketball season

2025–26 Nicholls Colonels men's basketball
- Conference: Southland Conference
- Record: 14–19 (12–10 Southland)
- Head coach: Tevon Saddler (3rd season)
- Associate head coach: Jovan Coleman
- Assistant coaches: Tyler Guidry; Darius Dangerfield
- Home arena: Stopher Gymnasium

2025–26 Southland Conference men's basketball standings
| | Conf. | | | | Overall |
| Team | W | | L | PCT | W | | L | PCT |
|---|---|---|---|---|---|---|---|---|
| Stephen F. Austin | 20 | – | 2 | .909 | 28 | – | 6 | .824 |
| McNeese † | 19 | – | 3 | .864 | 28 | – | 6 | .824 |
| UT Rio Grande Valley | 14 | – | 8 | .636 | 19 | – | 14 | .576 |
| Texas A&M–Corpus Christi | 13 | – | 9 | .591 | 18 | – | 15 | .545 |
| New Orleans | 12 | – | 10 | .545 | 15 | – | 18 | .455 |
| Nicholls | 12 | – | 10 | .545 | 14 | – | 19 | .424 |
| Northwestern State | 8 | – | 14 | .364 | 10 | – | 22 | .313 |
| Houston Christian | 8 | – | 14 | .364 | 12 | – | 20 | .375 |
| Incarnate Word | 7 | – | 15 | .318 | 12 | – | 19 | .387 |
| Lamar | 7 | – | 15 | .318 | 12 | – | 19 | .387 |
| East Texas A&M | 6 | – | 16 | .273 | 11 | – | 21 | .344 |
| Southeastern Louisiana | 6 | – | 16 | .273 | 9 | – | 22 | .290 |
† 2026 Southland tournament winner

The 2025–26 Nicholls State Colonels men's basketball team represented Nicholls State University in the 2025–26 NCAA Division I men's basketball season. The Colonels, led by third-year head coach Tevon Saddler, played their home games at Stopher Gymnasium in Thibodaux, Louisiana as members of the Southland Conference.

== Previous season ==
The Colonels finished the 2024–25 season 20–13, 13–7 in Southland play to finish in third place. They defeated Incarnate Word, before falling to Lamar in the Southland tournament semifinals.

== Roster ==
2025–26 Nicholls Colonels men's basketball team
Players
Coaches

| Pos. | # | Name | Height | Weight | Year | Previous school | Hometown |
|---|---|---|---|---|---|---|---|
| G | 0 | Jalin Rice | 6 ft 3 in (1.91 m) | 185 lb (84 kg) | Sr | Cleveland State | Flora, Mississippi |
| G | 1 | Trae English | 6 ft 0 in (1.83 m) | 175 lb (79 kg) | RS Sr | McNeese | Baltimore, Maryland |
| G | 2 | Christian Winborne | 6 ft 3 in (1.91 m) | 185 lb (84 kg) | Sr | Iona | Baltimore, Maryland |
| G | 3 | Jaylen Searles | 6 ft 8 in (2.03 m) | 195 lb (88 kg) | GS | Utah Tech | Everett, Washington |
| F | 5 | Sincere Malone | 6 ft 8 in (2.03 m) | 210 lb (95 kg) | Sr | Eastern Illinois | Chicago, Illinois |
| G | 6 | Jordan Matthews | 6 ft 3 in (1.91 m) | 170 lb (77 kg) | Fr | Vandebilt Catholic High School | Houma, Louisiana |
| F | 7 | Grant Sanders | 6 ft 10 in (2.08 m) | 205 lb (93 kg) | Sr | Brewton–Parker Christian | McDonough, Georgia |
| G | 8 | Kevin Pazmino | 6 ft 4 in (1.93 m) | 195 lb (88 kg) | Jr | Florida | Weston, Florida |
| G | 9 | Zaiden Cross | 6 ft 7 in (2.01 m) | 180 lb (82 kg) | Sr | Tennessee Southern | Scarborough, Ontario |
| G | 21 | Nick Krass | 6 ft 4 in (1.93 m) | 195 lb (88 kg) | Jr | Tarleton State | Gulfport, Mississippi |
| G | 22 | Jalik Dunkley | 6 ft 7 in (2.01 m) | 200 lb (91 kg) | So | Arizona Christian | Hamilton, Ontario |
| G | 24 | Zee Hamoda | 6 ft 7 in (2.01 m) | 180 lb (82 kg) | Sr | Sacramento State | Riffa, Bahrain |
| F | 25 | Domanic Betancourt | 6 ft 10 in (2.08 m) | 225 lb (102 kg) | Jr | Brewton–Parker Christian | Tampa, Florida |

Head coach

- Tevon Saddler (Nicholls State)

Assistant coach(es)

- Jovan Coleman (Mississippi State)
- Tyler Guidry (SAGU)
- Darius Dangerfield (Lycoming)

Legend

- (C) Team captain
- (S) Suspended
- (I) Ineligible
- (W) Walk-on
- Injured
- Current redshirt

Roster
Last update: November 27, 2025

== Schedule and results ==
| Date time, TV | Rank^{#} | Opponent^{#} | Result | Record | High points | High rebounds | High assists | Site (attendance) city, state |
Regular season
| November 4, 2025*; 6:00 p.m., SECN+ | | at No. 9 Kentucky; BBN United Tipoff Classic | L 51–77 | 0–1 | 13 – J. Rice | 6 – G. Sanders | 4 – T. English | Rupp Arena (19,289); Lexington, KY |
| November 7, 2025*; 7:00 p.m., ESPN+ | | at Eastern Illinois; BBN United Tipoff Classic | L 57–65 | 0–2 | 20 – J. Searles | 10 – S. Malone | 3 – J. Searles | Groniger Arena (1,024); Charleston, IL |
| November 12, 2025*; 7:00 p.m., ESPN+ | | at Valparaiso; BBN United Tipoff Classic | L 63–68 | 0–3 | 14 – T. English | 7 – Tied | 2 – Tied | Athletics–Recreation Center (867); Valparaiso, IN |
| November 15, 2025*; 4:30 p.m., ESPN+ | | at Murray State | L 79–99 | 0–4 | 18 – J. Dunkley | 5 – C. Winborne | 4 – Tied | CFSB Center; Murray, KY |
| November 22, 2025*; 1:00 p.m., ESPN+ | | at Oklahoma State | L 81–95 | 0–5 | 22 – J. Dunkley | 12 – J. Dunkley | 5 – S. Malone | Gallagher-Iba Arena (4,703); Stillwater, OK |
| November 28, 2025*; 2:00 p.m., ESPN+ | | at Tulane | L 72–82 | 0–6 | 22 – J. Searles | 15 – J. Dunkley | 5 – Tied | Devlin Fieldhouse (1,168); New Orleans, LA |
| December 2, 2025*; 8:00 p.m., truTV | | at Creighton | L 76–96 | 0–7 | 20 – C. Winborne | 7 – J. Searles | 4 – T. English | CHI Health Center Omaha (15,742); Omaha, NE |
| December 6, 2025; 3:00 p.m., ESPN+ | | Incarnate Word | W 74–67 | 1–7 (1–0) | 19 – J. Dunkley | 6 – J. Dunkley | 5 – T. English | Stopher Gymnasium (721); Thibodaux, LA |
| December 10, 2025*; 6:30 p.m., ESPN+ | | College of Biblical Studies | W 117–49 | 2–7 | 20 – Z. Cross | 12 – D. Betancourt | 5 – J. Searles | Stopher Gymnasium (505); Thibodaux, LA |
| December 17, 2025; 6:30 p.m., ESPN+ | | Houston Christian | W 79–64 | 3–7 (2–0) | 23 – J. Dunkley | 5 – Tied | 3 – Tied | Stopher Gymnasium (544); Thibodaux, LA |
| December 21, 2025*; 6:00 p.m., ESPN+ | | at Pacific | L 82–95 | 3–8 | 21 – J. Searles | 4 – J. Dunkley | 6 – J. Searles | Alex G. Spanos Center (1,055); Stockton, CA |
| December 29, 2025; 7:30 p.m., ESPN+ | | at Texas A&M–Corpus Christi | W 76–71 | 4–8 (3–0) | 16 – J. Dunkley | 7 – J. Searles | 8 – T. English | Hilliard Center (1,223); Corpus Christi, TX |
| December 31, 2025; 4:30 p.m., ESPN+ | | at UT Rio Grande Valley | W 71–69 | 5–8 (4–0) | 22 – J. Dunkley | 12 – J. Dunkley | 4 – J. Searles | UTRGV Fieldhouse (613); Edinburg, TX |
| January 3, 2026; 3:00 p.m., ESPN+ | | East Texas A&M | W 80–58 | 6–8 (5–0) | 21 – S. Malone | 13 – J. Searles | 7 – J. Searles | Stopher Gymnasium (613); Thibodaux, LA |
| January 5, 2026; 6:30 p.m., ESPN+ | | Northwestern State | W 74–72 | 7–8 (6–0) | 18 – J. Searles | 7 – J. Dunkley | 3 – Tied | Stopher Gymnasium (511); Thibodaux, LA |
| January 10, 2026; 5:00 p.m., ESPN+ | | at New Orleans | W 90–77 | 8–8 (7–0) | 24 – J. Searles | 5 – Tied | 7 – T. English | Lakefront Arena (906); New Orleans, LA |
| January 12, 2026; 6:30 p.m., ESPN+ | | at McNeese | L 68–94 | 8–9 (7–1) | 17 – C. Winborne | 8 – S. Malone | 5 – Tied | The Legacy Center (3,073); Lake Charles, LA |
| January 17, 2026; 3:00 p.m., ESPN+ | | Lamar | L 80–90 | 8–10 (7–2) | 22 – S. Malone | 7 – G. Sanders | 8 – S. Malone | Stopher Gymnasium (655); Thibodaux, LA |
| January 19, 2026; 6:30 p.m., ESPN+ | | Stephen F. Austin | L 62–79 | 8–11 (7–3) | 22 – J. Searles | 8 – Tied | 3 – S. Malone | Stopher Gymnasium (721); Thibodaux, LA |
| January 24, 2026; 3:30 p.m., ESPN+ | | at Southeastern Louisiana | L 61–67 | 8–12 (7–4) | 19 – S. Malone | 10 – J. Dunkley | 3 – Tied | University Center (564); Hammond, LA |
| January 27, 2026; 3:30 p.m., ESPN+ | | New Orleans | L 62−80 | 8−13 (7−5) | 19 – Z. Hamoda | 7 – Z. Hamoda | 8 – S. Malone | Stopher Gymnasium (915); Thibodaux, LA |
| January 31, 2026; 5:00 p.m., ESPN+ | | at East Texas A&M | W 72–68 | 9–13 (8–5) | 20 – J. Dunkley | 7 – J. Dunkley | 3 – Tied | The Field House (478); Commerce, TX |
| February 2, 2026; 6:30 p.m., ESPN+ | | at Northwestern State | W 61–58 | 10–13 (9–5) | 16 – Z. Hamoda | 10 – J. Dunkley | 3 – Z. Hamoda | Prather Coliseum (1,000); Natchitoches, LA |
| February 7, 2026; 3:00 p.m., ESPN+ | | Texas A&M–Corpus Christi | L 76–83 | 10–14 (9–6) | 18 – S. Malone | 7 – Tied | 5 – S. Malone | Stopher Gymnasium (603); Thibodaux, LA |
| February 9, 2026; 6:30 p.m., ESPN+ | | UT Rio Grande Valley | L 72–92 | 10–15 (9–7) | 20 – T. English | 7 – J. Dunkley | 4 – S. Malone | Stopher Gymnasium (521); Thibodaux, LA |
| February 14, 2026; 4:00 p.m., ESPN+ | | at Incarnate Word | W 91–83 | 11–15 (10–7) | 18 – Tied | 6 – J. Searles | 7 – T. English | McDermott Center (146); San Antonio, TX |
| February 16, 2026; 7:00 p.m., ESPN+ | | at Houston Christian | L 68–72 | 11–16 (10–8) | 17 – T. English | 10 – J. Dunnkley | 6 – T. English | Sharp Gymnasium (901); Houston, TX |
| February 21, 2026; 5:00 p.m., ESPN+ | | at Stephen F. Austin | L 78–81 | 11–17 (10–9) | 24 – Z. Hamoda | 5 – Z. Hamoda | 6 – T. English | William R. Johnson Coliseum (4,212); Nacogdoches, TX |
| February 23, 2026; 6:00 p.m., CBSSN | | at Lamar | W 53–52 | 12–17 (11–9) | 18 – T. English | 9 – Z. Hamoda | 3 – J. Rice | Neches Arena (2,437); Beaumont, TX |
| February 28, 2026; 3:00 p.m., ESPN+ | | Southeastern Louisiana | W 68–60 | 13–17 (12–9) | 16 – English | 10 – Malone | 5 – Tied | Stopher Gymnasium (833); Thibodaux, LA |
| March 2, 2026; 6:30 p.m., CBSSN | | McNeese | L 65–75 | 13–18 (12–10) | 20 – English | 14 – Rice | 3 – Searles | Stopher Gymnasium (912); Thibodaux, LA |
Southland tournament
| March 8, 2026; 7:30 pm, ESPN+ | (6) | vs. (7) Northwestern State; First round | W 61–47 | 14–18 | 14 – Malone | 7 – Dunkley | 4 – Sanders | The Legacy Center (2,835); Lake Charles, LA |
| March 9, 2026; 7:30 pm, ESPN+ | (6) | vs. (3) UT Rio Grande Valley; Quarterfinals | L 68−86 | 14−19 | 17 – English | 12 – Sanders | 5 – Sanders | The Legacy Center; Lake Charles, LA |
*Non-conference game. ^{#}Rankings from AP poll. (#) Tournament seedings in parentheses. All times are in Central.

== Conference awards and honors ==
=== Weekly awards ===
Weekly honors
| Honors | Player | Position | Date awarded | Ref. |

== See also ==
- 2025–26 Nicholls Colonels women's basketball team
