= 2025–26 Stephen F. Austin Lumberjacks basketball team =

American college basketball season

2025–26 Stephen F. Austin Lumberjacks basketball

Southland regular season champion

NIT, First round
- Conference: Southland Conference
- Record: 28–6 (20–2 Southland)
- Head coach: Matt Braeuer (1st season)
- Associate head coach: Jimmy Smith
- Assistant coaches: Jovan Austin; Payne Andrus; Trajan Wesley
- Home arena: William R. Johnson Coliseum

2025–26 Southland Conference men's basketball standings
	Conf.				Overall
Team	W		L	PCT	W		L	PCT
Stephen F. Austin	20	–	2	.909	28	–	6	.824
McNeese †	19	–	3	.864	28	–	6	.824
UT Rio Grande Valley	14	–	8	.636	19	–	14	.576
Texas A&M–Corpus Christi	13	–	9	.591	18	–	15	.545
New Orleans	12	–	10	.545	15	–	18	.455
Nicholls	12	–	10	.545	14	–	19	.424
Northwestern State	8	–	14	.364	10	–	22	.313
Houston Christian	8	–	14	.364	12	–	20	.375
Incarnate Word	7	–	15	.318	12	–	19	.387
Lamar	7	–	15	.318	12	–	19	.387
East Texas A&M	6	–	16	.273	11	–	21	.344
Southeastern Louisiana	6	–	16	.273	9	–	22	.290
† 2026 Southland tournament winner

The 2025–26 Stephen F. Austin Lumberjacks basketball team represented Stephen F. Austin State University during the 2025–26 NCAA Division I men's basketball season. The Lumberjacks, led by first-year head coach Matt Braeuer, played their home games at the William R. Johnson Coliseum in Nacogdoches, Texas as members of the Southland Conference.

== Previous season ==
The Lumberjacks finished the 2024–25 season 14–17, 7–13 in Southland Conference play, to finish in tenth place. They failed to qualify for the Southland Conference tournament, as only the top eight teams make it.

During the season, on January 22, 2025, head coach Kyle Keller was relieved of his duties, in the midst of his ninth season at the helm, with associate head coach Tony Jasick being named interim head coach for the remainder of the season. On March 7, 2025, the school announced that they would be hiring Texas Tech assistant coach Matt Braeuer as the team's new head coach.

== Roster ==
2025–26 Stephen F. Austin Lumberjacks men's basketball team
Players
Coaches

Pos.	#	Name	Height	Weight	Year	Previous school	Hometown
G	0	Kam Burton	6 ft 3 in (1.91 m)	195 lb (88 kg)	Jr	Southeastern Louisiana	Houston, TX
G/F	1	Chrishawn Christmas	6 ft 5 in (1.96 m)	210 lb (95 kg)	Sr	Panola College	Gary, IN
F	2	Jerald Colonel	6 ft 9 in (2.06 m)	200 lb (91 kg)	Sr	Northwestern State	Savannah, GA
G/F	3	Christian Green	6 ft 6 in (1.98 m)	195 lb (88 kg)	Jr	Trinity	San Antonio, TX
G	4	Marcus Scurry	5 ft 11 in (1.8 m)	170 lb (77 kg)	Fr	George P. Butler High School	Augusta, GA
G	5	Keon Thompson	6 ft 1 in (1.85 m)	200 lb (91 kg)	Sr	UMass	Merrillville, IN
G	6	Narit Chotikavanic	6 ft 2 in (1.88 m)	195 lb (88 kg)	So	West Texas A&M	Plano, TX
F	7	Tichyque Musaka	6 ft 11 in (2.11 m)	210 lb (95 kg)	Jr	Gulf Coast State	Durham, NC
G	8	Bryceson Melvin	6 ft 5 in (1.96 m)	200 lb (91 kg)	Fr	RWG STEM Academy	Arlington, TX
G	9	Harris Dar	6 ft 3 in (1.91 m)	185 lb (84 kg)	So	Grinnell	Plano, TX
F	10	Yohan Gutierrez	6 ft 8 in (2.03 m)	185 lb (84 kg)	Fr	Legacy School of Sport Sciences	Spring, TX
G	11	Lateef Patrick	6 ft 2 in (1.88 m)	205 lb (93 kg)	Jr	Trinidad State	Milton, MA
F	12	Eltramon Smith Jr.	6 ft 7 in (2.01 m)	200 lb (91 kg)	So	Barton Community College	Atlanta, GA
F	17	Gediminas Alisas	6 ft 6 in (1.98 m)	235 lb (107 kg)	So	Western Wyoming CC	Vilnius, Lithuania
G	21	Ahamed Mohammed	6 ft 1 in (1.85 m)	180 lb (82 kg)	Sr	West Texas A&M	Glendale, AZ

Head coach

- Matt Braeuer (Wichita State)

Assistant coach(es)

- Jimmy Smith (Mary Hardin–Baylor)
- Jovan Austin (East Texas A&M)
- Payne Andrus (MidAmerica Nazarene)
- Trajan Wesley (Louisiana)

Legend

- (C) Team captain
- (S) Suspended
- (I) Ineligible
- (W) Walk-on
- Injured
- Current redshirt

Roster
Last update: November 28, 2025

== Schedule and results ==
Date time, TV	Rank^{#}	Opponent^{#}	Result	Record	High points	High rebounds	High assists	Site (attendance) city, state
Exhibition
October 25, 2025*; 6:00 pm		vs. Sam Houston; Battle of the Piney Woods	W 105–100 ^{OT}	–	–	–	–	Delmar Fieldhouse; Houston, TX
Regular season
November 3, 2025*; 2:00 pm, ESPN+		Millsaps	W 103–76	1–0	20 – Thompson	9 – tied	6 – Christmas	William R. Johnson Coliseum (896); Nacogdoches, TX
November 7, 2025*; 6:00 pm, ESPN+		Arkansas State	W 90–65	2–0	26 – Thompson	11 – Colonel	7 – Thompson	William R. Johnson Coliseum (1,923); Nacogdoches, TX
November 11, 2025*; 7:00 pm, ESPN+		at Rice	W 81–69	3–0	27 – Thompson	9 – Colonel	3 – tied	Tudor Fieldhouse (1,293); Houston, TX
November 14, 2025*; 8:00 pm, ESPN+		Abilene Christian	W 76−66	4−0	24 – Chotikavanic	12 – Thompson	6 – Thompson	William R. Johnson Coliseum; Nacogdoches, TX
November 18, 2025*; 8:00 pm, MWN		at Fresno State; Acrisure Series on-campus game	L 78−80	4−1	27 – Patrick	8 – tied	6 – Thompson	Save Mart Center (2,953); Fresno, CA
November 21, 2025*; 8:00 pm, ESPN+		at Pepperdine; Acrisure Series on-campus game	W 63–60	5–1	22 – Chotikavanic	8 – Thompson	5 – Thompson	Firestone Fieldhouse (481); Malibu, CA
November 29, 2025*; 2:00 pm, ESPN+		at UT Arlington	L 61–66	5–2	20 – Thompson	7 – Colonel	4 – Colonel	College Park Center (1,275); Arlington, TX
December 3, 2025; 6:00 pm, ESPN+		UT Rio Grande Valley	W 73–60	6–2 (1–0)	13 – Chotikavanic	10 – Christmas	6 – Thompson	William R. Johnson Coliseum (1,513); Nacogdoches, TX
December 7, 2025*; 2:00 pm, ESPN+		Louisiana–Monroe	W 96–76	7–2	25 – Thompson	8 – Colonel	5 – tied	William R. Johnson Coliseum (982); Nacogdoches, TX
December 17, 2025; 8:00 pm, ESPN+		Texas A&M–Corpus Christi	W 69−60	8−2 (2−0)	20 – Patrick	8 – Colonel	3 – tied	William R. Johnson Coliseum (1,112); Nacogdoches, TX
December 21, 2025*; 1:00 pm, ESPN+		Dallas	W 103−55	9−2	18 – Patrick	8 – Colonel	8 – Thompson	William R. Johnson Coliseum (1,692); Nacogdoches, TX
December 29, 2025; 6:30 pm, ESPN+		at East Texas A&M	W 75–48	10–2 (3–0)	17 – Patrick	10 – tied	6 – Thompson	The Field House (448); Commerce, TX
December 31, 2025; 3:30 pm, ESPN+		at Northwestern State	W 74–64	11–2 (4–0)	21 – Thompson	9 – Colonel	5 – Thompson	Prather Coliseum (301); Natchitoches, LA
January 3, 2026; 3:30 pm, ESPN+		at Southeastern Louisiana	W 73-63	12–2 (5–0)	17 – tied	8 – Colonel	4 – Alisas	Pride Roofing University Center (403); Hammond, LA
January 5, 2026; 6:30 pm, ESPN+		at McNeese	L 64–66	12–3 (5–1)	15 – Patrick	11 – Christmas	5 – Patrick	Townsley Law Arena (2,784); Lake Charles, LA
January 10, 2026; 5:00 pm, ESPN+		Houston Christian	W 85–67	13–3 (6–1)	16 – Thompson	6 – Christmas	6 – Mohammed	William R. Johnson Coliseum (1,624); Nacogdoches, TX
January 12, 2026; 6:00 pm, ESPN+		Incarnate Word	W 56–46	14–3 (7–1)	15 – Thompson	12 – Christmas	3 – Thompson	William R. Johnson Coliseum (1,387); Nacogdoches, TX
January 17, 2026; 5:00 pm, ESPN+		at New Orleans	W 84–79	15–3 (8–1)	29 – Patrick	9 – Colonel	6 – Thompson	Lakefront Arena (375); New Orleans, LA
January 19, 2026; 6:30 pm, ESPN+		at Nicholls	W 79–62	16–3 (9–1)	20 – Thompson	14 – Christmas	3 – tied	Stopher Gymnasium (721); Thibodaux, LA
January 24, 2026; 3:00 pm, ESPN+		at Lamar	W 88–81	17–3 (10–1)	26 – Thompson	6 – tied	5 – Thompson	Neches Arena (1,498); Beaumont, TX
January 27, 2026; 3:00 pm, CBSSN/ESPN+		Northwestern State	W 69−67	18−3 (11−1)	27 – Thompson	10 – tied	2 – tied	William R. Johnson Coliseum (4,675); Nacogdoches, TX
January 31, 2026; 5:00 pm, ESPN+		Southeastern Louisiana	W 85–58	19–3 (12–1)	15 – Thompson	4 – tied	6 – Mohammed	William R. Johnson Coliseum (3,946); Nacogdoches, TX
February 2, 2026; 6:00 pm, ESPN+		McNeese	W 67–60	20–3 (13–1)	21 – Thompson	10 – Christmas	3 – Thompson	William R. Johnson Coliseum (5,687); Nacogdoches, TX
February 7, 2026; 5:00 pm, ESPN+		Lamar	W 84–74	21–3 (14–1)	20 – Patrick	8 – Christmas	8 – Thompson	William R. Johnson Coliseum (3,872); Nacogdoches, TX
February 9, 2026; 6:00 pm, ESPN+		East Texas A&M	W 74–70	22–3 (15–1)	19 – Burton	7 – tied	7 – Thompson	William R. Johnson Coliseum (2,482); Nacogdoches, TX
February 14, 2026; 4:30 pm, ESPN+		at UT Rio Grande Valley	W 66–57	23–3 (16–1)	32 – Thompson	13 – Colonel	2 – Tied	UTRGV Fieldhouse (1,223); Edinburg, TX
February 16, 2026; 7:00 pm, ESPN+		at Texas A&M–Corpus Christi	W 78–68	24–3 (17–1)	21 – Patrick	7 – Colonel	2 – Tied	Hilliard Center (1,317); Corpus Christi, TX
February 21, 2026; 5:00 pm, ESPN+		Nicholls	W 81–78	25–3 (18–1)	20 – Patrick	7 – Colonel	9 – Thompson	William R. Johnson Coliseum (4,212); Nacogdoches, TX
February 23, 2026; 6:30 pm, ESPN+		New Orleans	L 73–77	25–4 (18–2)	19 – Tied	13 – Colonel	6 – Thompson	William R. Johnson Coliseum (3,922); Nacogdoches, TX
February 28, 2026; 3:30 pm, ESPN+		at Houston Christian	W 77–56	26–4 (19–2)	17 – Thompson	11 – Colonel	4 – Mohammed	Sharp Gymnasium (789); Houston, TX
March 2, 2026; 6:30 pm, ESPN+		at Incarnate Word	W 76–68	27–4 (20–2)	28 – Patrick	9 – Christmas	5 – Thompson	McDermott Center (244); San Antonio, TX
Southland tournament
March 10, 2026; 6:00 pm, ESPNU	(1)	(4) Texas A&M–Corpus Christi; Semifinals	W 60–58	28–4	24 – Thompson	6 – Tied	5 – Thompson	Townsley Law Arena; Lake Charles, LA
March 11, 2026; 4:00 pm, ESPN2	(1)	(2) McNeese; Championship	L 59–76	28–5	18 – Thompson	9 – Colonel	3 – Thompson	Townsley Law Arena (5,272); Lake Charles, LA
NIT
March 17, 2026; 8:00 p.m., ESPNU		at (1 T) Tulsa; First round	L 84–89 ^{OT}	28–6	27 – Thompson	7 – Tied	5 – Tied	Reynolds Center (1,679); Tulsa, OK
*Non-conference game. ^{#}Rankings from AP Poll. (#) Tournament seedings in parentheses. T=Tulsa. All times are in Central.
