= 2025–26 Lamar Cardinals basketball team =

American college basketball season

2025–26 Lamar Cardinals basketball
- Conference: Southland Conference
- Record: 12–19 (7–15 Southland)
- Head coach: Alvin Brooks (5th season)
- Assistant coaches: Wendell Moore (5th season); Charles Harral (5th season); Ethan Quinn (2nd season); Jordan Gillon (1st season)
- Home arena: Neches Arena

2025–26 Southland Conference men's basketball standings
	Conf.				Overall
Team	W		L	PCT	W		L	PCT
Stephen F. Austin	20	–	2	.909	28	–	6	.824
McNeese †	19	–	3	.864	28	–	6	.824
UT Rio Grande Valley	14	–	8	.636	19	–	14	.576
Texas A&M–Corpus Christi	13	–	9	.591	18	–	15	.545
New Orleans	12	–	10	.545	15	–	18	.455
Nicholls	12	–	10	.545	14	–	19	.424
Northwestern State	8	–	14	.364	10	–	22	.313
Houston Christian	8	–	14	.364	12	–	20	.375
Incarnate Word	7	–	15	.318	12	–	19	.387
Lamar	7	–	15	.318	12	–	19	.387
East Texas A&M	6	–	16	.273	11	–	21	.344
Southeastern Louisiana	6	–	16	.273	9	–	22	.290
† 2026 Southland tournament winner

The 2025–26 Lamar Cardinals basketball team represented Lamar University during the 2025–26 NCAA Division I men's basketball season. The Cardinals, led by fifth-year head coach Alvin Brooks, played their home games at the Neches Arena in Beaumont, Texas as members of the Southland Conference.

== Previous season ==
The Cardinals finished the 2024–25 season 20–13, 14–6 in Southland Conference play, to finish in second place. They defeated Nicholls in the semifinals of the Southland Conference tournament before falling to top-seeded McNeese in the championship game.

== Roster ==
2025–26 Lamar Cardinals men's basketball team
Players
Coaches

Pos.	#	Name	Height	Weight	Year	Previous school	Hometown
G	0	Cody Pennebaker	6 ft 5 in (1.96 m)	194 lb (88 kg)	Sr	Park Center High School	Brooklyn Park, MN
G	1	Quinton Sanders	6 ft 3 in (1.91 m)	175 lb (79 kg)	Fr	Wheatley High School	Houston, TX
G	2	Jayden Barrs	6 ft 1 in (1.85 m)	190 lb (86 kg)	So	Manor High School	Manor, TX
G	3	King-Njhsanni Wilhite	6 ft 1 in (1.85 m)	175 lb (79 kg)	Jr	City College of San Francisco	San Francisco, CA
F	4	Braden East	6 ft 9 in (2.06 m)	238 lb (108 kg)	So	Stafford High School	Houston, TX
G	5	Jayden Gambrell	6 ft 3 in (1.91 m)	170 lb (77 kg)	Fr	Madison High School	Houston, TX
G	8	B.B. Knight	6 ft 6 in (1.98 m)	192 lb (87 kg)	Jr	Tulsa	Katy, TX
F	10	Errol White	6 ft 7 in (2.01 m)	205 lb (93 kg)	Sr	Eastern New Mexico	Queens, NY
G	11	Eian Lowe	5 ft 10 in (1.78 m)	155 lb (70 kg)	Fr	Marshall High School	Fort Bend, TX
PF	12	Christian Thomas	6 ft 5 in (1.96 m)	190 lb (86 kg)	Fr	C.E. King High School	Baltimore, MD
F	20	Spencer Ezewiro	6 ft 9 in (2.06 m)	220 lb (100 kg)	Jr	Cerritos College	Paramount, CA
F	22	Andrew Holifield	6 ft 10 in (2.08 m)	185 lb (84 kg)	Sr	Ranger College	Beaumont, TX
G	24	Rob Jr. Lee	6 ft 2 in (1.88 m)	190 lb (86 kg)	Jr	Wayne State	Flint, MI
F/C	32	Janko Bulajic	6 ft 10 in (2.08 m)	233 lb (106 kg)	Sr	KK Podgorica	Nikšić, Montenegro
C	51	Izuchukwu Emelife	6 ft 7 in (2.01 m)	220 lb (100 kg)	Fr	Clear Springs High School	League City, TX

Head coach

- Alvin Brooks (Lamar)

Assistant coach(es)

- Wendell Moore (Georgia Southern)
- Charles Harral (Texas Tech)
- Ethan Quinn (Minnesota)
- Jordan Gillon (Texas Southern)

Legend

- (C) Team captain
- (S) Suspended
- (I) Ineligible
- (W) Walk-on
- Injured
- Current redshirt

Roster
Last update: November 30, 2025

== Schedule and results ==
Date time, TV	Rank^{#}	Opponent^{#}	Result	Record	High points	High rebounds	High assists	Site (attendance) city, state
Exhibition
October 29, 2025*; 6:00 p.m.		Mary Hardin–Baylor	W 90–49	–	17 – Holifield	11 – East	–	Neches Arena; Beaumont, TX
Regular season
November 3, 2025*; 11:00 a.m., ESPN+		Texas A&M–San Antonio	W 93–53	1–0	27 – Gambrell	6 – 2 tied	6 – 3 tied	Neches Arena (7,531); Beaumont, TX
November 10, 2025*; 7:00 p.m., ESPN+		at TCU	L 65–78	1–1	26 – Lee Jr.	6 – Pennebaker	3 – 3 tied	Schollmaier Arena (4,567); Fort Worth, TX
November 17, 2025*; 6:30 p.m., ESPN+		at Louisiana–Monroe	W 79–66	2–1	23 – Holifield	9 – 2 tied	4 – Lowe	Fant–Ewing Coliseum (1,002); Monroe, LA
November 23, 2025*; 3:00 p.m., ESPN+		at Montana; Blaine Taylor Classic	W 68−63	3−1	18 – Holifield	12 – East	3 – 2 tied	Dahlberg Arena (2,550); Missoula, MT
November 24, 2025*; 3:00 p.m., ESPN+		vs. Oakland; Blaine Taylor Classic	L 68−83	3−2	15 – Holifield	9 – Holifield	5 – Pennebaker	Dahlberg Arena (117); Missoula, MT
November 29, 2025*; 6:00 p.m., ESPN+		Our Lady of the Lake	W 90–46	4–2	26 – Lee Jr.	11 – East	4 – 3 tied	Neches Arena (1,049); Beaumont, TX
December 3, 2025*; 6:00 p.m., ESPN+		Louisiana	W 65–55	5–2	24 – East	12 – East	5 – Lee	Neches Arena (1,499); Beaumont, TX
December 6, 2025; 6:00 p.m., ESPN+		Texas A&M–Corpus Christi	L 49–57	5–3 (0–1)	15 – Lee Jr.	8 – East	3 – 2 tied	Neches Arena (1,349); Beaumont, TX
December 10, 2025*; 9:00 p.m., MWN		at San Diego State	L 71–89	5–4	21 – Lee Jr.	6 – 2 tied	5 – Wilhite	Viejas Arena (11,257); San Diego, CA
December 16, 2025; 6:00 p.m., ESPN+		UT Rio Grande Valley	L 72–83	5–5 (0–2)	24 – Holifield	8 – 3 tied	5 – Pennebaker	Neches Arena (1,054); Beaumont, TX
December 20, 2025*; 6:00 p.m., ESPN+		Omaha	L 82–85 ^{OT}	5–6	24 – Lee Jr.	14 – East	4 – Lowe	Neches Arena (1,120); Beaumont, TX
December 29, 2025; 6:30 p.m., ESPN+		at Northwestern State	W 76–61	6–6 (1–2)	19 – Lee Jr.	12 – East	3 – Lowe	Prather Coliseum (302); Natchitoches, LA
December 31, 2025; 11:00 a.m., ESPN+		at East Texas A&M	W 69–62	7–6 (2–2)	16 – Holifield	9 – East	4 – Wilhite	The Field House (317); Commerce, TX
January 2, 2026; 6:00 p.m., CBSSN		at McNeese; Battle of the Border	L 70–82	7–7 (2–3)	21 – Holifield	10 – East	4 – White	Townsley Law Arena (4,612); Lake Charles, LA
January 5, 2026; 6:00 p.m., ESPN+		at Southeastern Louisiana	L 52–60	7–8 (2–4)	17 – Holifield	10 – East	1 – 4 tied	Pride Roofing University Center (388); Hammond, LA
January 10, 2026; 6:00 p.m., ESPN+		Incarnate Word	W 63–51	8–8 (3–4)	23 – East	7 – Lee Jr.	5 – Lee Jr.	Neches Arena (1,414); Beaumont, TX
January 12, 2026; 6:00 p.m., ESPN+		Houston Christian	W 64–56	9–8 (4–4)	31 – Lee Jr.	7 – 2 tied	4 – Wilhite	Neches Arena (982); Beaumont, TX
January 17, 2026; 3:00 p.m., ESPN+		at Nicholls	W 90–80	10–8 (5–4)	20 – Lee Jr.	8 – East	7 – Lowe	Stopher Gymnasium (655); Thibodaux, LA
January 19, 2026; 7:00 p.m., ESPN+		at New Orleans	L 76–89	10–9 (5–5)	26 – East	11 – East	5 – 2 tied	Lakefront Arena (361); New Orleans, LA
January 24, 2026; 3:00 p.m., ESPN+		Stephen F. Austin	L 81–88	10–10 (5–6)	19 – Lee Jr.	13 – East	5 – Pennebaker	Neches Arena (1,498); Beaumont, TX
January 27, 2026; 6:00 p.m., ESPN+		East Texas A&M	W 82−61	11−10 (6−6)	28 – Lee Jr.	11 – East	4 – Pennebaker	Neches Arena (1,297); Beaumont, TX
January 31, 2026; 6:00 p.m., ESPN+		McNeese; Battle of the Border	L 63–64	11–11 (6–7)	25 – Lee Jr.	13 – East	6 – Wilhite	Neches Arena (5,714); Beaumont, TX
February 2, 2026; 6:00 p.m., ESPN+		Southeastern Louisiana	W 73–54	12–11 (7–7)	28 – Lee Jr.	11 – East	7 – Lowe	Neches Arena (1,237); Beaumont, TX
February 7, 2026; 5:00 p.m., ESPN+		at Stephen F. Austin	L 74–84	12–12 (7–8)	33 – East	10 – East	5 – Lowe	William R. Johnson Coliseum (3,872); Nacogdoches, TX
February 9, 2026; 6:00 p.m., ESPN+		Northwestern State	L 68–70	12–13 (7–9)	18 – Lee Jr.	12 – East	4 – Lowe	Neches Arena (1,092); Beaumont, TX
February 14, 2026; 3:30 p.m., ESPN+		at Texas A&M–Corpus Christi	L 63–76	12–14 (7–10)	24 – Lee Jr.	8 – Holifield	2 – 2 tied	Hilliard Center (1,511); Corpus Christi, TX
February 16, 2026; 6:30 p.m., ESPN+		at UT Rio Grande Valley	L 65–70	12–15 (7–11)	14 – Lee Jr.	10 – Pennebaker	4 – Lee Jr.	UTRGV Fieldhouse (1,719); Edinburg, TX
February 21, 2026; 6:00 p.m., ESPN+		New Orleans	L 71–77	12–16 (7–12)	14 – 2 tied	9 – Holifield	4 – 2 tied	Neches Arena (2,103); Beaumont, TX
February 23, 2026; 6:00 p.m., CBSSN		Nicholls	L 52–53	12–17 (7–13)	10 – Lee Jr.	11 – East	4 – Lowe	Neches Arena (2,437); Beaumont, TX
February 28, 2026; 4:00 p.m., ESPN+		at Incarnate Word	L 60–72	12–18 (7–14)	17 – Lee Jr.	7 – East	4 – Pennebaker	McDermott Center (300); San Antonio, TX
March 2, 2026; 7:30 p.m., CBSSN		at Houston Christian	L 53–75	12–19 (7–15)	16 – 2 tied	11 – East	5 – Lowe	Sharp Gymnasium (843); Houston, TX
*Non-conference game. ^{#}Rankings from AP poll. (#) Tournament seedings in parentheses. All times are in Central.
