= 2025–26 East Texas A&M Lions men's basketball team =

American college basketball season

2025–26 East Texas A&M Lions men's basketball
- Conference: Southland Conference
- Record: 11–21 (6–16 Southland)
- Head coach: Jaret von Rosenberg (9th season)
- Assistant coaches: Coleman Furst; A.J. Holland; Trey Conrod; Jared Kortsen; Clif Carroll
- Home arena: The Field House

2025–26 Southland Conference men's basketball standings
| | Conf. | | | | Overall |
| Team | W | | L | PCT | W | | L | PCT |
|---|---|---|---|---|---|---|---|---|
| Stephen F. Austin | 20 | – | 2 | .909 | 28 | – | 6 | .824 |
| McNeese † | 19 | – | 3 | .864 | 28 | – | 6 | .824 |
| UT Rio Grande Valley | 14 | – | 8 | .636 | 19 | – | 14 | .576 |
| Texas A&M–Corpus Christi | 13 | – | 9 | .591 | 18 | – | 15 | .545 |
| New Orleans | 12 | – | 10 | .545 | 15 | – | 18 | .455 |
| Nicholls | 12 | – | 10 | .545 | 14 | – | 19 | .424 |
| Northwestern State | 8 | – | 14 | .364 | 10 | – | 22 | .313 |
| Houston Christian | 8 | – | 14 | .364 | 12 | – | 20 | .375 |
| Incarnate Word | 7 | – | 15 | .318 | 12 | – | 19 | .387 |
| Lamar | 7 | – | 15 | .318 | 12 | – | 19 | .387 |
| East Texas A&M | 6 | – | 16 | .273 | 11 | – | 21 | .344 |
| Southeastern Louisiana | 6 | – | 16 | .273 | 9 | – | 22 | .290 |
† 2026 Southland tournament winner

The 2025–26 East Texas A&M Lions men's basketball team represented East Texas A&M University in the 2025–26 NCAA Division I men's basketball season. The Lions, led by eighth-year head coach Jaret von Rosenberg, played their home games at The Field House in Commerce, Texas as members of the Southland Conference.

This season marked the Lions' first year of postseason eligibility after their transition period from Division II to Division I. The Lions were originally ineligible for NCAA postseason play until the 2026–27 season. However, the Division I Council voted to shorten the period for such a transition to three years on January 15, 2025.

This was the first full season for the university under its current identity. On November 7, 2024, after the Lions had played their first two games of the 2024–25 season, the Texas A&M University System Board of Regents approved the proposed change of the university's name to East Texas A&M University. The name change took effect immediately.

The Lions finished 6–16 and in eleventh place in the conference. Thus, they were one of four Southland Conference teams not to qualify for the conference tournament.

== Previous season ==
The Lions finished the 2024–25 season 5–26, 3–17 in Southland play, to finish in eleventh place. Failing to qualify for the Southland Conference tournament, the Lions' season ended with a 63–59 victory over Houston Christian.

== Roster ==
2025–26 East Texas A&M Lions men's basketball team
Players
Coaches

| Pos. | # | Name | Height | Weight | Year | Previous school | Hometown |
|---|---|---|---|---|---|---|---|
| F | 0 | Ronnie Harrison | 6 ft 8 in (2.03 m) | 210 lb (95 kg) | Jr | Tarleton | Forney, TX |
| G | 1 | Vinny Sigona | 6 ft 0 in (1.83 m) | 165 lb (75 kg) | Jr | Collin College | Plano, TX |
| G | 2 | Evan Phelps | 6 ft 0 in (1.83 m) | 180 lb (82 kg) | Jr | Duncanville HS | Midland, TX |
| G | 3 | Mykol Sanchez-Vega | 6 ft 5 in (1.96 m) | 175 lb (79 kg) | Sr | Indian River State | Juana Diaz, PR |
| G | 4 | Chris Adlam | 6 ft 3 in (1.91 m) | 185 lb (84 kg) | So | Houston Christian HS | Cypress, TX |
| F | 5 | Tay Mosher | 6 ft 7 in (2.01 m) | 215 lb (98 kg) | Sr | Otero JC | The Colony, TX |
| G | 6 | London Fields | 6 ft 5 in (1.96 m) | 185 lb (84 kg) | Jr | Louisiana | Tupelo, MS |
| F | 7 | Michael Folarin | 6 ft 10 in (2.08 m) | 240 lb (109 kg) | Sr | St. Bonaventure | London, England |
| G | 8 | Damian Garcia | 6 ft 5 in (1.96 m) | 175 lb (79 kg) | Sr | Brescia | Houston, TX |
| F | 10 | Josh Taylor | 6 ft 8 in (2.03 m) | 205 lb (93 kg) | Sr | St. Thomas (FL) | Atlanta, GA |
| G | 11 | Kamren Robinson | 6 ft 0 in (1.83 m) | 160 lb (73 kg) | Fr | Arizona Compass | Suffolk, VA |
| G | 12 | Kollin Tolbert | 6 ft 2 in (1.88 m) | 190 lb (86 kg) | Jr | Concord | Cincinnati, OH |
| F | 13 | Noah Pagotto | 6 ft 8 in (2.03 m) | 220 lb (100 kg) | Jr | West Texas A&M | Wollongong, NSW |
| G | 20 | Parker Whisenhunt | 6 ft 3 in (1.91 m) | 190 lb (86 kg) | So | Pratt CC | Sulphur Springs, TX |
| G | 25 | Gianni Hunt | 6 ft 4 in (1.93 m) | 190 lb (86 kg) | Sr | Bethune-Cookman | Lakewood, CA |
| G | 30 | Alex McCray | 6 ft 1 in (1.85 m) | 175 lb (79 kg) | Jr | FSCJ | Gainesville, FL |

Head coach

- Jaret von Rosenberg (Hartford)

Assistant coach(es)

- Coleman Furst (Tarleton State)
- A.J. Holland (Sioux Falls)
- Trey Conrod (East Texas A&M)
- Jared Kortsen (Emerson)
- Clif Carroll (Texas Tech)

Legend

- (C) Team captain
- (S) Suspended
- (I) Ineligible
- (W) Walk-on
- Injured
- Current redshirt

Roster
Last update: November 20, 2025

== Schedule and results ==
| Date time, TV | Rank^{#} | Opponent^{#} | Result | Record | High points | High rebounds | High assists | Site (attendance) city, state |
Exhibition
| October 25, 2025*; 6:00 p.m. | | at Tarleton State | L 50–61 | – | 18 – Sigona | 5 – Folarin | 2 – Tied | EECU Center (813); Stephenville, TX |
| October 29, 2025*; 6:30 p.m. | | UT Dallas | W 93–75 | – | 20 – Sigona | 8 – Taylor | 7 – Hunt | The Field House; Commerce, TX |
Regular season
| November 3, 2025*; 10:30 a.m., ESPN+ | | Arlington Baptist | W 119–60 | 1–0 | 20 – Harrison | 7 – Taylor | 6 – Tied | The Field House (1,787); Commerce, TX |
| November 5, 2025*; 8:00 p.m. | | at New Mexico | L 54–76 | 1–1 | 18 – Harrison | 9 – Folarin | 3 – Tied | The Pit (10,726); Albuquerque, NM |
| November 10, 2025*; 12:00 a.m., ESPN+ | | at Hawai'i | L 74–100 | 1–2 | 15 – Taylor | 5 – Harrison | 3 – Tied | Stan Sheriff Center (3,947); Honolulu, HI |
| November 14, 2025*; 7:00 p.m., ESPN+ | | at Rice | L 64–71 | 1–3 | 14 – Pagotto | 5 – Tied | 4 – Tied | Tudor Fieldhouse (1,117); Houston, TX |
| November 19, 2025*; 6:30 p.m., ESPN+ | | Dallas Christian | W 115–44 | 2–3 | 24 – Garcia | 12 – Folarin | 11 – Hunt | The Field House (374); Commerce, TX |
| November 24, 2025*; 11:00 a.m., YES | | at Fairleigh Dickinson; FDU Basketball Classic | W 70–65 | 3–3 | 18 – Hunt | 8 – Hunt | 6 – Hunt | Bogota Savings Bank Center (700); Hackensack, NJ |
| November 25, 2025*; 1:00 p.m. | | vs. Army; FDU Basketball Classic | W 84–67 | 4–3 | 20 – Garcia | 8 – Tied | 4 – Hunt | Bogota Savings Bank Center (350); Hackensack, NJ |
| December 5, 2025*; 6:30 p.m., Peacock | | at No. 5 UConn | L 59–83 | 4–4 | 15 – Harrison | 7 – Hunt | 3 – Garcia | Gampel Pavilion (10,244); Storrs, CT |
| December 7, 2025*; 5:00 p.m., ESPN+ | | Central Arkansas | W 75–68 | 5–4 | 21 – Hunt | 8 – Folarin | 7 – Hunt | The Field House (413); Commerce, TX |
| December 12, 2025; 7:30 p.m., ESPN+ | | at McNeese | L 66–102 | 5–5 (0–1) | 18 – Pagotto | 5 – Hunt | 4 – Sigona | The Legacy Center (3,179); Lake Charles, LA |
| December 15, 2025; 6:00 p.m., ESPN+ | | at Southeastern Louisiana | W 70–69 | 6–5 (1–1) | 16 – Tied | 9 – Harrison | 5 – Garcia | University Center (371); Hammond, LA |
| December 21, 2025*; 3:00 p.m., SECN+ | | at Texas A&M | L 77–118 | 6–6 | 23 – Harrison | 7 – Folarin | 5 – Hunt | Reed Arena (4,495); College Station, TX |
| December 29, 2025; 6:30 p.m., ESPN+ | | Stephen F. Austin | L 48–75 | 6–7 (1–2) | 13 – Sigona | 10 – Harrison | 2 – Harrison | The Field House (448); Commerce, TX |
| December 31, 2025; 11:00 a.m., ESPN+ | | Lamar | L 62–69 | 6–8 (1–3) | 19 – Harrison | 8 – Pagotto | 4 – Hunt | The Field House; Commerce, TX |
| January 3, 2026; 3:00 p.m., ESPN+ | | at Nicholls | L 58–80 | 6–9 (1–4) | 17 – Taylor | 7 – Pagotto | 6 – Phelps | Stopher Gymnasium (613); Thibodaux, LA |
| January 5, 2026; 7:00 p.m., ESPN+ | | at New Orleans | L 73–83 | 6–10 (1–5) | 29 – Harrison | 12 – Harrison | 7 – Hunt | Lakefront Arena (389); New Orleans, LA |
| January 10, 2026; 1:00 p.m., ESPN+ | | UT Rio Grande Valley | W 77–69 | 7–10 (2–5) | 18 – Harrison | 11 – Pagotto | 10 – Hunt | The Field House (372); Commerce, TX |
| January 12, 2026; 6:30 p.m., ESPN+ | | Texas A&M–Corpus Christi | L 50–61 | 7–11 (2–6) | 12 – Harrison | 9 – Pagotto | 3 – Mosher | The Field House (784); Commerce, TX |
| January 17, 2026; 3:30 p.m., ESPN+ | | at Houston Christian | L 70–81 | 7–12 (2–7) | 19 – Garcia | 7 – Pagotto | 6 – Hunt | Sharp Gymnasium (788); Houston, TX |
| January 19, 2026; 5:00 p.m., ESPN+ | | at Incarnate Word | W 80–58 | 8–12 (3–7) | 17 – Garcia | 8 – Harrison | 7 – Hunt | McDermott Center (163); San Antonio, TX |
| January 24, 2026; 3:30 p.m., ESPN+ | | at Northwestern State | Postponed to Feb. 4 due to inclement weather | | | | | Prather Coliseum; Natchitoches, LA |
| January 27, 2026; 6:00 p.m., ESPN+ | | at Lamar | L 61–82 | 8–13 (3–8) | 11 – Garcia | 6 – Tied | 5 – Hunt | Neches Arena (1,297); Beaumont, TX |
| January 31, 2026; 5:00 p.m., ESPN+ | | Nicholls | L 68–72 | 8–14 (3–9) | 20 – Harrison | 8 – Garcia | 7 – Hunt | The Field House (478); Commerce, TX |
| February 2, 2026; 6:30 p.m., ESPN+ | | New Orleans | L 85–94 | 8–15 (3–10) | 23 – Hunt | 8 – Harrison | 6 – Hunt | The Field House (407); Commerce, TX |
| February 4, 2026; 6:30 p.m., ESPN+ | | at Northwestern State | W 74–68 | 9–15 (4–10) | 16 – Tied | 7 – Pagotto | 6 – Hunt | Prather Coliseum (404); Natchitoches, LA |
| February 7, 2026; 5:00 p.m., ESPN+ | | Northwestern State | W 52–48 | 10–15 (5–10) | 12 – Pagotto | 14 – Pagotto | 4 – Hunt | The Field House (446); Commerce, TX |
| February 9, 2026; 6:00 p.m., ESPN+ | | at Stephen F. Austin | L 70–74 | 10–16 (5–11) | 28 – Hunt | 9 – Harrison | 7 – Harrison | William R. Johnson Coliseum (2,482); Nacogdoches, TX |
| February 14, 2026; 5:00 p.m., ESPN+ | | McNeese | L 54–97 | 10–17 (5–12) | 19 – Harrison | 7 – Pagotto | 6 – Hunt | The Field House (502); Commerce, TX |
| February 16, 2026; 1:00 p.m., ESPN+ | | Southeastern Louisiana | W 70–53 | 11–17 (6–12) | 15 – Hunt | 11 – Pagotto | 6 – Hunt | The Field House (333); Commerce, TX |
| February 21, 2026; 5:00 p.m., ESPN+ | | Incarnate Word | L 73–82 | 11–18 (6–13) | 26 – Pagotto | 8 – Pagotto | 6 – Tied | The Field House (634); Commerce, TX |
| February 23, 2026; 6:30 p.m., ESPN+ | | Houston Christian | L 68–69 | 11–19 (6–14) | 25 – Hunt | 6 – Harrison | 3 – Tied | The Field House (438); Commerce, TX |
| February 28, 2026; 4:30 p.m., ESPN+ | | at UT Rio Grande Valley | L 55–63 | 11–20 (6–15) | 18 – Pagotto | 10 – Pagotto | 6 – Hunt | UTRGV Fieldhouse (1,723); Edinburg, TX |
| March 2, 2026; 7:00 p.m., ESPN+ | | at Texas A&M–Corpus Christi | L 71–84 | 11–21 (6–16) | 17 – Tied | 6 – Pagotto | 6 – Hunt | Hilliard Center (1,423); Corpus Christi, TX |
*Non-conference game. ^{#}Rankings from AP poll. (#) Tournament seedings in parentheses. All times are in Central.

== See also ==
- 2025–26 East Texas A&M Lions women's basketball team
