= 2025–26 Incarnate Word Cardinals men's basketball team =

American college basketball season

2025–26 Incarnate Word Cardinals men's basketball
- Conference: Southland Conference
- Record: 12–19 (7–15 Southland)
- Head coach: Shane Heirman (3rd season)
- Assistant coaches: Tony Barbee (1st season); Dave Wojcik (1st season); Ben Lang (3rd season); Aidan Kunst (1st season); Alexander Cossé (1st season)
- Home arena: McDermott Center (Capacity: 2,000)

2025–26 Southland Conference men's basketball standings
	Conf.				Overall
Team	W		L	PCT	W		L	PCT
Stephen F. Austin	20	–	2	.909	27	–	4	.871
McNeese	19	–	3	.864	26	–	5	.839
UT Rio Grande Valley	14	–	8	.636	18	–	13	.581
Texas A&M–Corpus Christi	13	–	9	.591	17	–	14	.548
New Orleans	12	–	10	.545	14	–	17	.452
Nicholls	12	–	10	.545	13	–	18	.419
Northwestern State	8	–	14	.364	10	–	21	.323
Houston Christian	8	–	14	.364	12	–	19	.387
Incarnate Word	7	–	15	.318	12	–	19	.387
Lamar	7	–	15	.318	12	–	19	.387
East Texas A&M	6	–	16	.273	11	–	21	.344
Southeastern Louisiana	6	–	16	.273	9	–	22	.290
† 2026 Southland tournament winner As of March 2, 2026

The 2025–26 Incarnate Word Cardinals men's basketball team represented the University of the Incarnate Word during the 2025–26 NCAA Division I men's basketball season. The Cardinals, led by third-year head coach Shane Heirman, played their home games at the McDermott Center in San Antonio, Texas as members of the Southland Conference.

== Previous season ==
The Cardinals finished the 2024–25 season 19–17, 9–11 in Southland Conference play, to finish in a tie for seventh place. They defeated Southeastern Louisiana, before falling to Nicholls in the quarterfinals of the Southland Conference tournament. They received an invitation to the CBI, where they would defeat Manhattan and Jacksonville, before falling to eventual tournament champions Illinois State in the semifinals.

== Roster ==
2025–26 Incarnate Word Cardinals men's basketball team
Players
Coaches

Pos.	#	Name	Height	Weight	Year	Previous school	Hometown
G/F	0	Esteban Mann	6 ft 7 in (2.01 m)	206 lb (93 kg)	Jr	East Los Angeles College	Los Angeles, CA
G	2	Tahj Staveskie	6 ft 1 in (1.85 m)	185 lb (84 kg)	GS	Cleveland State	Sandusky, OH
G	3	Love Bettis	5 ft 11 in (1.8 m)	165 lb (75 kg)	GS	Northwestern State	Pensacola, FL
F/C	4	Jayden Williams	6 ft 9 in (2.06 m)	230 lb (104 kg)	So	Bella Vista Prep	Chicago, IL
G	5	Davion Bailey	6 ft 4 in (1.93 m)	195 lb (88 kg)	GS	Southeastern CC	Indianapolis, IN
G	6	Harrison Reede	6 ft 1 in (1.85 m)	173 lb (78 kg)	RS So	Southern Utah	Aberdeen, SD
G/F	7	Jordan Pyke	6 ft 7 in (2.01 m)	200 lb (91 kg)	Jr	Union (TN)	Greensboro, NC
F	8	Marcus Glover	6 ft 8 in (2.03 m)	230 lb (104 kg)	Jr	Hillcrest Academy	Chicago, IL
F	9	Mihael Tomic	6 ft 9 in (2.06 m)	—	Fr	Bosco Institute	Zagreb, Croatia
G	10	Harold Woods	6 ft 5 in (1.96 m)	215 lb (98 kg)	Sr	Northeastern	Hammond, IN
F	21	Lewis Rowe	6 ft 10 in (2.08 m)	250 lb (113 kg)	GS	St. Edward's	Adelaide, Australia
G/F	22	Drew Barbee	6 ft 5 in (1.96 m)	200 lb (91 kg)	So	Central Michigan	Memphis, TN
G	93	Tyler Simon	6 ft 5 in (1.96 m)	200 lb (91 kg)	GS	Harvard	Houston, TX
G	99	Amani Drummond	6 ft 1 in (1.85 m)	170 lb (77 kg)	Sr	Central Michigan	Houston, TX

Head coach

- Shane Heirman (Tulsa)

Assistant coach(es)

- Tony Barbee (UMass)
- Dave Wojcik (Loyola (MD))
- Ben Lang (DePaul)
- Aidan Kunst (Purdue)
- Alexander Cossé (Southeastern Louisiana)

Legend

- (C) Team captain
- (S) Suspended
- (I) Ineligible
- (W) Walk-on
- Injured
- Current redshirt

Roster
Last update: December 1, 2025

== Schedule and results ==
Date time, TV	Rank^{#}	Opponent^{#}	Result	Record	High points	High rebounds	High assists	Site (attendance) city, state
Regular season
November 3, 2025*; 8:00 pm, MWN		at Colorado State	L 64–98	0–1	27 – Staveskie	6 – Bailey	4 – Staveskie	Moby Arena (4,679); Fort Collins, CO
November 7, 2025*; 1:00 pm, ESPN+		Jarvis Christian	W 104–60	1–1	36 – Reede	11 – Woods	7 – Staveskie	McDermott Center; San Antonio, TX
November 11, 2025*; 5:00 pm, ESPN+		Southwestern Christian	W 109–70	2–1	29 – Staveskie	11 – Staveskie	10 – Staveskie	McDermott Center (256); San Antonio, TX
November 16, 2025*; 4:30 pm, BTN		at Indiana	L 61−69	2−2	17 – Staveskie	5 – Glover	5 – Staveskie	Simon Skjodt Assembly Hall (17,222); Bloomington, IN
November 20, 2025*; 11:30 am, BallerTV		vs. Southern Indiana; Boardwalk Battle semifinals	W 87−81	3−2	25 – Bailey	9 – Woods	4 – Staveskie	Ocean Center (475); Daytona Beach, FL
November 22, 2025*; 6:00 pm, BallerTV		vs. High Point; Boardwalk Battle championship	L 80–91	3–3	30 – Bailey	9 – Woods	3 – Tied	Ocean Center (606); Daytona Beach, FL
November 26, 2025*; 2:00 pm, ESPN+		Texas Lutheran	W 117–55	4–3	21 – Staveskie	17 – Woods	3 – Tied	McDermott Center (196); San Antonio, TX
December 1, 2025; 6:30 pm, ESPN+		McNeese	W 71–67	5–3 (1–0)	29 – Bailey	7 – Tied	5 – Bailey	McDermott Center (1,003); San Antonio, TX
December 6, 2025; 3:00 pm, ESPN+		at Nicholls	L 67–74	5–4 (1–1)	21 – Pyke	9 – Pyke	3 – Staveskie	Stopher Gymnasium (721); Thibodaux, LA
December 8, 2025; 7:00 pm, ESPN+		at New Orleans	L 83–84	5–5 (1–2)	28 – Bailey	6 – Woods	5 – Staveskie	Lakefront Arena (368); New Orleans, LA
December 15, 2025*; 7:00 pm, ESPN+		at TCU	L 65–69	5–6	32 – Bailey	7 – Pyke	7 – Pyke	Schollmaier Arena (4,262); Fort Worth, TX
December 21, 2025*; 2:00 pm, ESPN+		Northern Arizona	W 90–66	6–6	24 – Bailey	7 – Woods	7 – Staveskie	McDermott Center (231); San Antonio, TX
December 30, 2025; 2:00 pm, ESPN+		Southeastern Louisiana	W 79−70	7−6 (2−2)	26 – Pyke	10 – Woods	6 – Staveskie	McDermott Center (104); San Antonio, TX
January 3, 2026; 4:00 pm, ESPN+		Houston Christian	W 73–56	8–6 (3–2)	27 – Staveskie	10 – Pyke	2 – Staveskie	McDermott Center (201); San Antonio, TX
January 5, 2026; 6:30 pm, ESPN+		at UT Rio Grande Valley	L 67–80	8–7 (3–3)	21 – Staveskie	9 – Pyke	4 – Tied	UTRGV Fieldhouse (711); Edinburg, TX
January 10, 2026; 6:00 pm, ESPN+		at Lamar	L 51–63	8–8 (3–4)	11 – Staveskie	8 – Woods	7 – Staveskie	Neches Arena (1,414); Beaumont, TX
January 12, 2026; 6:00 pm, ESPN+		at Stephen F. Austin	L 46–56	8–9 (3–5)	10 – Bailey	8 – Woods	2 – Tied	William R. Johnson Coliseum (1,387); Nacogdoches, TX
January 17, 2026; 4:00 pm, ESPN+		Northwestern State	W 76–74	9–9 (4–5)	20 – Miles	9 – Williams	4 – Thomas	McDermott Center; San Antonio, TX
January 19, 2026; 5:00 pm, ESPN+		East Texas A&M	L 58–80	9–10 (4–6)	17 – Staveskie	5 – Woods	3 – Woods	McDermott Center (163); San Antonio, TX
January 24, 2026; 3:30 pm, ESPN+		Texas A&M–Corpus Christi	L 71–79	9–11 (4–7)	25 – Staveskie	7 – Tied	4 – Staveskie	McDermott Center; San Antonio, TX
January 26, 2026; 7:00 pm, ESPN+		at Houston Christian	L 75−81	9−12 (4−8)	27 – Pyke	8 – Pyke	4 – Staveskie	Sharp Gymnasium (781); Houston, TX
January 31, 2026; 4:00 pm, ESPN+		UT Rio Grande Valley	L 93–106	9–13 (4–9)	33 – Pyke	12 – Woods	7 – Staveskie	McDermott Center (234); San Antonio, TX
February 2, 2026; 7:00 pm, CBSSN		at Texas A&M–Corpus Christi	W 71–69	10–13 (5–9)	36 – Bailey	9 – Woods	3 – Bailey	Hilliard Center (1,785); Corpus Christi, TX
February 7, 2026; 4:00 pm, ESPN+		at McNeese	L 64–81	10–14 (5–10)	19 – Staveskie	11 – Mann	3 – Tied	Townsley Law Arena (3,554); Lake Charles, LA
February 9, 2026; 6:00 pm, ESPN+		at Southeastern Louisiana	L 62–74	10–15 (5–11)	20 – Bailey	10 – Mann	3 – Pyke	Pride Roofing University Center (439); Hammond, LA
February 14, 2026; 4:00 pm, ESPN+		Nicholls	L 83–91	10–16 (5–12)	24 – Pyke	7 – Tied	3 – Staveskie	McDermott Center (146); San Antonio, TX
February 16, 2026; 6:30 pm, ESPN+		New Orleans	L 64–78	10–17 (5–13)	19 – Bailey	5 – Woods	5 – Staveskie	McDermott Center (168); San Antonio, TX
February 21, 2026; 5:00 pm, ESPN+		at East Texas A&M	W 82–73	11–17 (6–13)	33 – Staveskie	8 – Tomic	5 – Staveskie	The Field House (634); Commerce, TX
February 23, 2026; 6:30 pm, ESPN+		at Northwestern State	L 49–54	11–18 (6–14)	21 – Bailey	10 – Bailey	5 – Bailey	Prather Coliseum (601); Natchitoches, LA
February 28, 2026; 4:00 pm, ESPN+		Lamar	W 72–60	12–18 (7–14)	26 – Bailey	7 – Woods	4 – Staveskie	McDermott Center (300); San Antonio, TX
March 2, 2026; 6:30 pm, ESPN+		Stephen F. Austin	L 68–76	12–19 (7–15)	21 – Bailey	7 – Rowe	4 – Staveskie	McDermott Center (244); San Antonio, TX
*Non-conference game. ^{#}Rankings from AP Poll. (#) Tournament seedings in parentheses. All times are in Central.
