= 2025–26 New Orleans Privateers men's basketball team =

American college basketball season

2025–26 New Orleans Privateers men's basketball
- Conference: Southland Conference
- Record: 15–18 (12–10 Southland)
- Head coach: Stacy Hollowell (2nd season)
- Assistant coaches: Trey Lindsey; Javan Felix; Andrew Fava; Silvey Dominguez
- Home arena: Lakefront Arena

2025–26 Southland Conference men's basketball standings
	Conf.				Overall
Team	W		L	PCT	W		L	PCT
Stephen F. Austin	20	–	2	.909	28	–	6	.824
McNeese †	19	–	3	.864	28	–	6	.824
UT Rio Grande Valley	14	–	8	.636	19	–	14	.576
Texas A&M–Corpus Christi	13	–	9	.591	18	–	15	.545
New Orleans	12	–	10	.545	15	–	18	.455
Nicholls	12	–	10	.545	14	–	19	.424
Northwestern State	8	–	14	.364	10	–	22	.313
Houston Christian	8	–	14	.364	12	–	20	.375
Incarnate Word	7	–	15	.318	12	–	19	.387
Lamar	7	–	15	.318	12	–	19	.387
East Texas A&M	6	–	16	.273	11	–	21	.344
Southeastern Louisiana	6	–	16	.273	9	–	22	.290
† 2026 Southland tournament winner

The 2025–26 New Orleans Privateers men's basketball team represented the University of New Orleans during the 2025–26 NCAA Division I men's basketball season. The Privateers were led by second-year head coach Stacy Hollowell and played their home games at Lakefront Arena as members of the Southland Conference.

This was the final season for the Privateers under the "New Orleans" branding. In July 2026, the university rejoined the Louisiana State University System, adopting the new name of LSU New Orleans and changing its athletic brand accordingly.

== Previous season ==
The Privateers finished the 2024–25 season 4–27, 2–18 in conference play to finish in twelfth place. Failing to qualify for the SLC tournament, the Privateers' season ended with a 62–95 loss to Texas A&M–Corpus Christi.

== Roster ==
2025–26 New Orleans Privateers men's basketball team
Players
Coaches

Pos.	#	Name	Height	Weight	Year	Previous school	Hometown
G	1	JR Jacobs	5 ft 10 in (1.78 m)	170 lb (77 kg)	So	Walters State Community College	Memphis, Tennessee
G	2	Jah Short	6 ft 3 in (1.91 m)	180 lb (82 kg)	So	Farmville High School	Greenville, North Carolina
G	3	Theo Grant	6 ft 3 in (1.91 m)	170 lb (77 kg)	Jr	Temple College	Schertz, Texas
F	4	Omarion Henry	6 ft 7 in (2.01 m)	195 lb (88 kg)	Jr	Link Academy	St. Louis, Missouri
G	5	James White	6 ft 5 in (1.96 m)	202 lb (92 kg)	Sr	UAB	Conyers, Georgia
G	10	Dae Dae Hunter	5 ft 11 in (1.8 m)	170 lb (77 kg)	Jr	Pearl River Community College	Como, Mississippi
F	11	Leland Coleman	6 ft 8 in (2.03 m)	190 lb (86 kg)	Fr	Hargrave Military Academy	Richmond, Virginia
G	13	Jamond "Turk" Vincent	6 ft 4 in (1.93 m)	215 lb (98 kg)	Sr	L.B. Landry High School	New Orleans, Louisiana
G	15	Grant Kemp	5 ft 9 in (1.75 m)	165 lb (75 kg)	Jr	LSU–Alexandria	Madisonville, Louisiana
F	20	Luke Davis	6 ft 9 in (2.06 m)	220 lb (100 kg)	Sr	Midland College	Winterville, North Carolina
F	22	Kerwin Prince	6 ft 8 in (2.03 m)	225 lb (102 kg)	Sr	South Plains College	Waterbury, Connecticut
F	23	MJ Thomas	6 ft 8 in (2.03 m)	205 lb (93 kg)	Fr	Link Year Prep	Denton, Texas
G	24	Kohen Rowbatham	6 ft 0 in (1.83 m)	200 lb (91 kg)	Fr	St. Thomas Aquinas High School	Metairie, Louisiana
F	32	Jackson Sowards	6 ft 7 in (2.01 m)	185 lb (84 kg)	Fr	Metro Christian Academy	Tulsa, Oklahoma

Head coach

- Stacy Hollowell (St. Edward's)

Assistant coach(es)

- Trey Lindsey (Louisiana–Monroe)
- Javan Felix (Texas)
- Andrew Fava (Florida)
- Silvey Dominguez (New Mexico)

Legend

- (C) Team captain
- (S) Suspended
- (I) Ineligible
- (W) Walk-on
- Injured
- Current redshirt

Roster
Last update: November 4, 2025

== Schedule and results ==
Date time, TV	Rank^{#}	Opponent^{#}	Result	Record	High points	High rebounds	High assists	Site (attendance) city, state
Exhibition
October 18, 2025*; 1:00 p.m., ESPN+		Sacramento State	W 89−76	–	25 – Buckley	10 – Thomas	8 – Buckley	Lakefront Arena (908); New Orleans, LA
November 8, 2025*; 3:00 p.m., ESPN+		Southern–New Orleans	W 115−73	–	18 – Benson	6 – Osby	9 – Kemp	Lakefront Arena (2,691); New Orleans, LA
Regular season
November 3, 2025*; 7:00 p.m., ESPN+		at TCU	W 78–74	1–0	22 – Benson	7 – Tied	9 – Buckley	Schollmaier Arena (4,741); Fort Worth, TX
November 10, 2025*; 7:00 p.m., SECN+		at LSU	L 58–93	1–1	12 – Buckley	8 – Buckley	1 – Tied	Pete Maravich Assembly Center (6,505); Baton Rouge, LA
November 14, 2025*; 6:30 p.m., ESPN+		at Tulane	W 85–63	2–1	33 – Benson	8 – Abass	12 – Buckley	Devlin Fieldhouse (2,009); New Orleans, LA
November 18, 2025*; 8:00 p.m., ESPN+		at Pepperdine; Acrisure Series on-campus game	L 79–90	2–2	17 – Tied	14 – Thomas	6 – Benson	Firestone Fieldhouse (489); Malibu, CA
November 21, 2025*; 8:00 p.m., MW Network		at Fresno State; Acrisure Series on-campus game	L 76–85	2–3	25 – Buckley	14 – Buckley	4 – Thomas	Save Mart Center (3,874); Fresno, CA
November 24, 2025*; 6:30 p.m., SECN+		at Mississippi State	L 78–81 ^{OT}	2–4	25 – Benson	10 – Tied	6 – Buckley	Humphrey Coliseum (6,943); Starkville, MS
November 26, 2025*; 12:00 p.m., ESPN+		at No. 20 Texas Tech	L 50–82	2–5	16 – Buckley	6 – Majek	3 – Buckley	United Supermarkets Arena (10,441); Lubbock, TX
December 3, 2025*; 7:00 p.m., ESPN+		at Memphis	L 70–86	2–6	21 – Cope	8 – Thomas	6 – Coquia	FedExForum (9,123); Memphis, TN
December 6, 2025; 5:00 p.m., ESPN+		Houston Christian	L 76–85	2–7 (0–1)	26 – Benson	7 – Thomas	8 – Buckley	Lakefront Arena (1,741); New Orleans, LA
December 8, 2025; 7:00 p.m., ESPN+		Incarnate Word	W 84–83	3–7 (1–1)	19 – Cope	8 – Thomas	7 – Buckley	Lakefront Arena (368); New Orleans, LA
December 13, 2025*; 2:00 p.m., ESPN+		at No. 7 Houston	L 57–99	3–8	17 – Thomas	8 – Thomas	3 – Buckley	Fertitta Center (7,035); Houston, TX
December 29, 2025; 6:30 p.m., ESPN+		at UT Rio Grande Valley	W 85–69	4–8 (2–1)	32 – Buckley	10 – Thomas	4 – Tied	UTRGV Fieldhouse (1,010); Edinburg, TX
December 31, 2025; 3:30 p.m., ESPN+		at Texas A&M–Corpus Christi	L 69–83	4–9 (2–2)	15 – Tied	6 – Tied	4 – Buckley	Hilliard Center (1,089); Corpus Christi, TX
January 3, 2026; 3:30 p.m., ESPN+		at Northwestern State	L 68–74	4–10 (2–3)	17 – Buckley	12 – Thomas	4 – Buckley	Prather Coliseum (353); Natchitoches, LA
January 5, 2026; 7:00 p.m., ESPN+		East Texas A&M	W 83–73	5–10 (3–3)	17 – Benson	19 – Thomas	9 – Buckley	Lakefront Arena (389); New Orleans, LA
January 10, 2026; 5:00 p.m., ESPN+		Nicholls	L 77–90	5–11 (3–4)	26 – Benson	5 – Tied	3 – Tied	Lakefront Arena (906); New Orleans, LA
January 12, 2026; 6:00 p.m., ESPN+		at Southeastern Louisiana	W 79–76	6–11 (4–4)	30 – Benson	12 – Thomas	2 – Tied	University Center (415); Hammond, LA
January 17, 2026; 5:00 p.m., ESPN+		Stephen F. Austin	L 79–84	6–12 (4–5)	24 – Buckley	9 – Abass	7 – Buckley	Lakefront Arena (375); New Orleans, LA
January 19, 2026; 7:00 p.m., ESPN+		Lamar	W 89–76	7–12 (5–5)	20 – Tied	9 – Thomas	8 – Buckley	Lakefront Arena (361); New Orleans, LA
January 24, 2026; 4:00 p.m., ESPN+		at McNeese	L 63–82	7–13 (5–6)	23 – Benson	8 – Thomas	5 – Buckley	The Legacy Center (3,236); Lake Charles, LA
January 27, 2026; 6:30 p.m., ESPN+		at Nicholls	W 80–62	8–13 (6–6)	20 – Abass	8 – Abass	6 – Buckley	Stopher Gymnasium (915); Thibodaux, LA
January 31, 2026; 5:00 p.m., ESPN+		Northwestern State	W 75–64	9–13 (7–6)	18 – Buckley	7 – Tied	6 – Buckley	Lakefront Arena (793); New Orleans, LA
February 2, 2026; 6:30 p.m., ESPN+		at East Texas A&M	W 94–85	10–13 (8–6)	34 – Benson	9 – Boudouma	5 – Tied	The Field House (407); Commerce, TX
February 7, 2026; 5:00 p.m., ESPN+		UT Rio Grande Valley	L 76–95	10–14 (8–7)	25 – Buckley	7 – Buckley	4 – Buckley	Lakefront Arena (401); New Orleans, LA
February 9, 2026; 7:00 p.m., ESPN+		Texas A&M–Corpus Christi	W 84–78 ^{OT}	11–14 (9–7)	22 – Buckley	9 – Boudouma	3 – Tied	Lakefront Arena (396); New Orleans, LA
February 14, 2026; 3:30 p.m., ESPN+		at Houston Christian	L 60–61	11–15 (9–8)	18 – Abass	9 – Abass	6 – Buckley	Sharp Gymnasium (706); Houston, TX
February 16, 2026; 5:00 p.m., ESPN+		at Incarnate Word	W 78–64	12–15 (10–8)	18 – Benson	6 – Tied	4 – Buckley	McDermott Center (168); San Antonio, TX
February 21, 2026; 6:00 p.m., ESPN+		at Lamar	W 77–71	13–15 (11–8)	19 – Thomas	8 – Thomas	9 – Buckley	Neches Arena (2,103); Beaumont, TX
February 23, 2026; 6:00 p.m., ESPN+		at Stephen F. Austin	W 77–73	14–15 (12–8)	30 – Benson	10 – Thomas	11 – Buckley	William R. Johnson Coliseum (3,922); Nacogdoches, TX
February 28, 2026; 5:00 p.m., ESPN+		McNeese	L 63–66	14–16 (12–9)	16 – Osby	10 – Abass	4 – Buckley	Lakefront Arena (1,045); New Orleans, LA
March 2, 2026; 7:00 p.m., ESPN+		Southeastern Louisiana	L 78–82	14–17 (12–10)	28 – Buckley	6 – Thomas	13 – Buckey	Lakefront Arena (1,162); New Orleans, LA
Southland tournament
March 8, 2026; 5:00 pm, ESPN+	(5)	vs. (8) Houston Christian; First round	W 73–60	15–17	14 – Tied	12 – Thomas	6 – Buckley	The Legacy Center; Lake Charles, LA
March 9, 2026; 5:00 pm, ESPN+	(5)	vs. (4) Texas A&M–Corpus Christi; Quarterfinals	L 61–74	15–18	17 – Tied	14 – Thomas	3 – Tied	The Legacy Center; Lake Charles, LA
*Non-conference game. ^{#}Rankings from AP poll. (#) Tournament seedings in parentheses. All times are in Central.

== See also ==
- 2025–26 New Orleans Privateers women's basketball team
