= 2025–26 UT Rio Grande Valley Vaqueros men's basketball team =

American college basketball season

2025–26 UT Rio Grande Valley Vaqueros men's basketball
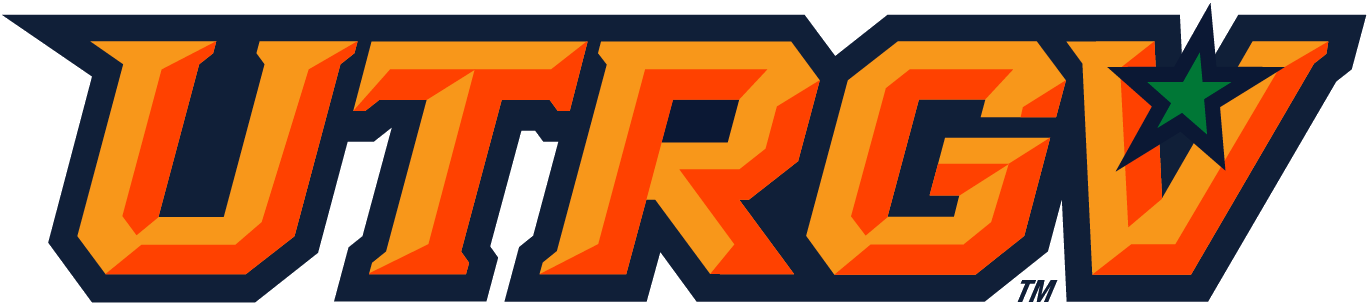
- Conference: Southland Conference
- Record: 19–14 (14–8 Southland)
- Head coach: Kahil Fennell (2nd season)
- Associate head coach: Brock Erickson
- Assistant coaches: Dustin Yoder; Cam Clark; Michael Provenzano
- Home arena: UTRGV Fieldhouse

2025–26 Southland Conference men's basketball standings
	Conf.				Overall
Team	W		L	PCT	W		L	PCT
Stephen F. Austin	20	–	2	.909	28	–	6	.824
McNeese †	19	–	3	.864	28	–	6	.824
UT Rio Grande Valley	14	–	8	.636	19	–	14	.576
Texas A&M–Corpus Christi	13	–	9	.591	18	–	15	.545
New Orleans	12	–	10	.545	15	–	18	.455
Nicholls	12	–	10	.545	14	–	19	.424
Northwestern State	8	–	14	.364	10	–	22	.313
Houston Christian	8	–	14	.364	12	–	20	.375
Incarnate Word	7	–	15	.318	12	–	19	.387
Lamar	7	–	15	.318	12	–	19	.387
East Texas A&M	6	–	16	.273	11	–	21	.344
Southeastern Louisiana	6	–	16	.273	9	–	22	.290
† 2026 Southland tournament winner

The 2025–26 UT Rio Grande Valley Vaqueros men's basketball team represented the University of Texas Rio Grande Valley during the 2025–26 NCAA Division I men's basketball season. The Vaqueros, led by second-year head coach Kahil Fennell, played their home games at UTRGV Fieldhouse in Edinburg, Texas as members of the Southland Conference.

== Previous season ==
The Vaqueros finished the 2024–25 season 16–15, 8–12 in Southland Conference play, to finish in ninth place. They failed to qualify for the Southland Conference tournament, as only the top eight teams make it.

== Roster ==
2025–26 UT Rio Grande Valley Vaqueros men's basketball team
Players
Coaches

Pos.	#	Name	Height	Weight	Year	Previous school	Hometown
G	0	Jaylen Washington	5 ft 10 in (1.78 m)	166 lb (75 kg)	So	Lake Highlands High School	Dallas, TX
G	1	Always Wright	6 ft 3 in (1.91 m)	178 lb (81 kg)	RS Jr	Rhode Island	Durango, Mexico
G	2	Demarris Winters	6 ft 3 in (1.91 m)	—	Fr	Richmond Heights High School	Cleveland, OH
F	3	Dane Christensen	6 ft 8 in (2.03 m)	220 lb (100 kg)	So	Gillette College	Orem, UT
G	4	Koree Cotton	6 ft 6 in (1.98 m)	210 lb (95 kg)	Jr	Jacksonville State	Miami, FL
G	5	Zae Blake	6 ft 1 in (1.85 m)	180 lb (82 kg)	GS	Wagner	Washington, D.C.
F	7	Kye Dickson	6 ft 7 in (2.01 m)	195 lb (88 kg)	Sr	Northwest Nazarene	Toronto, ON
G	10	Marvin III McGhee	6 ft 4 in (1.93 m)	195 lb (88 kg)	GS	Cal State Bakersfield	Atlanta, GA
F	12	Kwo Agwa	6 ft 6 in (1.98 m)	220 lb (100 kg)	GS	Texas A&M–Commerce	Calgary, AB
G	13	Julien Gomez	6 ft 2 in (1.88 m)	185 lb (84 kg)	Fr	La Mirada High School	La Mirada, CA
F	21	Marshal Destremau	6 ft 9 in (2.06 m)	238 lb (108 kg)	RS Jr	Clarendon College	Perth, Australia
G	22	Jalen Ricks	6 ft 7 in (2.01 m)	195 lb (88 kg)	RS Sr	South Plains College	Sherwood, AR
G	30	Luis Ramirez	6 ft 2 in (1.88 m)	190 lb (86 kg)	Jr	Los Fresnos High School	Brownsville, TX
F	33	Filip Brankovic	6 ft 8 in (2.03 m)	265 lb (120 kg)	Jr	Groningen	Inđija, Serbia
C	35	Mustafo Vanjov	7 ft 0 in (2.13 m)	235 lb (107 kg)	Sr	Curry College	Khorog, Tajikistan

Head coach

- Kahil Fennell (Redlands)

Assistant coach(es)

- Brock Erickson (Assumption)
- Dustin Yoder (Illinois)
- Cam Clark (Southwestern)
- Michael Provenzano (Simon Fraser)

Legend

- (C) Team captain
- (S) Suspended
- (I) Ineligible
- (W) Walk-on
- Injured
- Current redshirt

Roster
Last update: December 1, 2025

== Schedule and results ==
Date time, TV	Rank^{#}	Opponent^{#}	Result	Record	High points	High rebounds	High assists	Site (attendance) city, state
Regular season
November 3, 2025*; 7:00 p.m., ESPN+		at Baylor	L 81–96	0–1	16 – McGhee III	9 – McGhee III	4 – Wright	Foster Pavilion (6,422); Waco, TX
November 8, 2025*; 7:30 p.m., ESPN+		at Southern Utah	W 95–72	1–1	30 – McGhee III	10 – McGhee III	6 – Cotton	America First Event Center (1,489); Cedar City, UT
November 11, 2025*; 8:00 p.m., MWN		at Boise State	L 65–85	1–2	12 – Cotton	4 – Christensen	4 – Blake	ExtraMile Arena (8,999); Boise, ID
November 17, 2025*; 6:30 p.m., ESPN+		Southwestern Adventist	W 110−53	2−2	18 – Cotton	10 – Christensen	5 – Washington	UTRGV Fieldhouse (2,019); Edinburg, TX
November 22, 2025*; 4:00 p.m., ESPN+		at Missouri State; Illinois Showcase	L 67−74	2−3	13 – Cotton	9 – McGhee III	4 – Cotton	Great Southern Bank Arena (1,547); Springfield, MO
November 24, 2025*; 7:00 p.m., BTN		at No. 13 Illinois; Illinois Showcase	L 73–87	2–4	21 – Dickson	5 – 2 tied	3 – Wright	State Farm Center (11,853); Champaign, IL
December 3, 2025; 6:00 p.m., ESPN+		at Stephen F. Austin	L 60–73	2–5 (0–1)	15 – Washington	8 – 2 tied	3 – Cotton	William R. Johnson Coliseum (1,513); Nacogdoches, TX
December 7, 2025*; 1:00 p.m., ESPN+		Austin Peay	W 63–50	3–5	22 – Cotton	10 – Cotton	4 – Wright	UTRGV Fieldhouse (930); Edinburg, TX
December 11, 2025*; 6:30 p.m., ESPN+		UT Arlington	L 50–57	3–6	10 – McGhee	6 – 2 tied	3 – 2 tied	UTRGV Fieldhouse (1,213); Edinburg, TX
December 16, 2025; 6:00 p.m., ESPN+		at Lamar	W 83–72	4–6 (1–1)	18 – 2 tied	9 – Cotton	4 – 2 tied	Neches Arena (1,054); Beaumont, TX
December 20, 2025*; 2:00 p.m., ESPN+		Biblical Studies	W 109–51	5–6	15 – McGhee III	12 – Christensen	8 – Washington	UTRGV Fieldhouse (520); Edinburg, TX
December 29, 2025; 6:30 p.m., ESPN+		New Orleans	L 69−85	5−7 (1−2)	24 – Cotton	8 – Cotton	4 – Cotton	UTRGV Fieldhouse (1,010); Edinburg, TX
December 31, 2025; 4:30 p.m., ESPN+		Nicholls	L 69–71	5–8 (1–3)	17 – Washington	9 – Gomez	6 – Washington	UTRGV Fieldhouse (613); Edinburg, TX
January 3, 2026; 4:30 p.m., ESPN+		Texas A&M–Corpus Christi; South Texas Showdown	L 59–63	5–9 (1–4)	15 – Washington	8 – McGhee III	7 – Washington	UTRGV Fieldhouse (1,173); Edinburg, TX
January 5, 2026; 6:30 p.m., ESPN+		Incarnate Word	W 80–67	6–9 (2–4)	29 – Brankovic	9 – 2 tied	5 – 2 tied	UTRGV Fieldhouse (711); Edinburg, TX
January 10, 2026; 5:00 p.m., ESPN+		at East Texas A&M	L 69–77	6–10 (2–5)	16 – Brankovic	7 – Brankovic	4 – 2 tied	The Field House (372); Commerce, TX
January 12, 2026; 6:30 p.m., ESPN+		at Northwestern State	L 63–64	6–11 (2–6)	19 – Brankovic	6 – McGhee III	7 – Washington	Prather Coliseum (810); Natchitoches, LA
January 17, 2026; 4:30 p.m., ESPN+		McNeese	W 79–76	7–11 (3–6)	17 – McGhee III	7 – McGhee III	7 – Cotton	UTRGV Fieldhouse (2,119); Edinburg, TX
January 19, 2026; 6:30 p.m., ESPN+		Southeastern Louisiana	W 68–65	8–11 (4–6)	19 – McGhee III	11 – McGhee III	6 – Washington	UTRGV Fieldhouse (937); Edinburg, TX
January 24, 2026; 3:30 p.m., ESPN+		at Houston Christian	W 68–51	9–11 (5–6)	17 – McGhee III	6 – McGhee III	6 – Washington	Sharp Gymnasium (798); Houston, TX
January 26, 2026; 7:00 p.m., ESPN+		at Texas A&M–Corpus Christi; South Texas Showdown	W 64–55	10–11 (6–6)	19 – Gomez	7 – Gomez	2 – 3 tied	Hilliard Center (1,571); Corpus Christi, TX
January 31, 2026; 4:00 p.m., ESPN+		at Incarnate Word	W 106–93	11–11 (7–6)	21 – Cotton	5 – Brankovic	6 – Washington	McDermott Center (234); San Antonio, TX
February 2, 2026; 6:30 p.m., ESPN+		Houston Christian	W 74–57	12–11 (8–6)	17 – Brankovic	6 – 3 tied	6 – Washington	UTRGV Fieldhouse (1,357); Edinburg, TX
February 7, 2026; 5:00 p.m., ESPN+		at New Orleans	W 95–76	13–11 (9–6)	24 – Brankovic	7 – McGhee III	5 – Washington	Lakefront Arena (401); New Orleans, LA
February 9, 2026; 6:30 p.m., ESPN+		at Nicholls	W 92–72	14–11 (10–6)	26 – Washington	7 – Cotton	6 – Washington	Stopher Gymnasium (521); Thibodaux, LA
February 14, 2026; 4:30 p.m., ESPN+		Stephen F. Austin	L 57–66	14–12 (10–7)	15 – Cotton	8 – McGhee III	3 – Washington	UTRGV Fieldhouse (1,223); Edinburg, TX
February 16, 2026; 6:30 p.m., ESPN+		Lamar	W 70–65	15–12 (11–7)	19 – Brankovic	7 – Cotton	8 – Washington	UTRGV Fieldhouse (1,719); Edinburg, TX
February 21, 2026; 3:30 p.m., ESPN+		at Southeastern Louisiana	W 96–75	16–12 (12–7)	18 – 2 tied	7 – Blake	4 – 2 tied	Pride Roofing University Center (422); Hammond, LA
February 23, 2026; 6:30 p.m., ESPN+		at McNeese	L 68–75	16–13 (12–8)	15 – Brankovic	8 – Cotton	5 – Washington	Townsley Law Arena (2,872); Lake Charles, LA
February 28, 2026; 4:30 p.m., ESPN+		East Texas A&M	W 63–55	17–13 (13–8)	14 – Gomez	9 – Brankovic	4 – 2 tied	UTRGV Fieldhouse (1,723); Edinburg, TX
March 2, 2026; 6:30 p.m., ESPN+		Northwestern State	W 74–62	18–13 (14–8)	21 – Cotton	7 – Cotton	8 – Washington	UTRGV Fieldhouse (1,717); Edinburg, TX
Southland tournament
March 9, 2026; 7:30 p.m., ESPN+	(3)	vs. (6) Nicholls; Quarterfinals	W 86–68	19–13	21 – Brankovic	6 – Agwa	5 – 2 tied	Townsley Law Arena; Lake Charles, LA
March 10, 2026; 8:30 p.m., ESPN+	(3)	at (2) McNeese; Semifinals	L 80–84 ^{3OT}	19–14	20 – Cotton	13 – Cotton	4 – Brankovic	Townsley Law Arena (4,481); Lake Charles, LA
*Non-conference game. ^{#}Rankings from AP poll. (#) Tournament seedings in parentheses. All times are in Central.
