= Bill Armstrong (basketball) =

American basketball coach

Current position
- Title: Head coach
- Team: McNeese
- Conference: Southland
- Record: 28–6 (.824)

Biographical details
- Born: November 18, 1977 (age 48)

Playing career
- 1997–2001: UAB

Coaching career (HC unless noted)
- 2001–2002: UAB (GA)
- 2002–2003: Chipola JC (assistant)
- 2003–2006: Birmingham–Southern (assistant)
- 2012–2017: Ole Miss (assistant)
- 2017–2020: LSU (assistant)
- 2020–2022: LSU (AHC)
- 2022–2024: Link Academy (MO)
- 2024–2025: Baylor (assistant)
- 2025–present: McNeese

Administrative career (AD unless noted)
- 2006–2011: Ole Miss (CBO)

Head coaching record
- Overall: 28–6 (.824)
- Tournaments: 0–1 (NCAA Division I)

Bill Armstrong (born November 18, 1977) is an American college basketball coach who has been head coach of the McNeese State Cowboys since 2025. He played college basketball at UAB and has served as an assistant coach for Chipola College, Birmingham–Southern, Ole Miss, LSU and Baylor. He was also head coach at Link Academy (Missouri).

== Early life ==
Armstrong was born on November 18, 1977, and grew up in Birmingham, Alabama. He attended Oneonta High School where he played basketball, averaging 19.7 points as a senior while being named all-state. He then attended the University of Alabama at Birmingham where he played from 1998 to 2001. He helped the UAB Blazers reach the National Invitation Tournament (NIT) in 1998 and the NCAA Tournament in 1999, while Armstrong served as team captain as a senior. He graduated from UAB in 2001 with a degree in justice sciences.

== Coaching career ==
Armstrong began his coaching career as a graduate assistant for the Blazers from 2001 to 2002, then worked as an assistant coach at Chipola College for the 2002–03 season before being named an assistant with the Birmingham–Southern Panthers in 2003. After three years at Birmingham–Southern, he joined the Ole Miss Rebels in 2006 as coordinator of basketball operations. He served 11 seasons with the Rebels, his last six as an assistant coach, before leaving to join the LSU Tigers as an assistant in 2017. He was an assistant coach from 2017 to 2020 and then the associate head coach from 2020 to 2022, before him and head coach Will Wade were fired in 2022 for alleged recruiting violations. On June 22, 2023, Armstrong was found not guilty of all alleged recruiting violations by the IARP (Independent Accountability Resolution Process). The IARP noted, "He had a pristine infractions history, having never been charged with any NCAA legislation violations in his coaching career from 2001 until now." and that he was highly credible.

Armstrong served as head coach of Link Academy from 2022 to 2024, leading them to the 2023 national championship and coaching future first-round National Basketball Association (NBA) draft pick Ja'Kobe Walter. He served as an assistant coach for the Baylor Bears from 2024 to 2025 before being announced as the new head coach of the McNeese Cowboys in March 2025.

== Head coaching record ==
Record table
| Season | Team | Overall | Conference | Standing | Postseason |
|---|---|---|---|---|---|
McNeese Cowboys (Southland Conference) (2025–present)
| 2025–26 | McNeese | 28–6 | 19–3 | 2nd | NCAA Division I Round of 64 |
| McNeese: | | 28–6 (.824) | 19–3 (.864) | | |
| Total: | | 28–6 (.824) | | | |
National champion Postseason invitational champion Conference regular season champion Conference regular season and conference tournament champion Division regular season champion Division regular season and conference tournament champion Conference tournament champion
