= 2025 Southland Conference men's basketball tournament =

- Classification: Division I
- Season: 2024–25
- Teams: 8
- Site: The Legacy Center; Lake Charles, Louisiana
- Champions: McNeese Cowboys (4th title)
- Winning coach: Will Wade (2nd title)
- MVP: Javohn Garcia (McNeese)
- Attendance: 10,100 (total); 4,106 (championship)
- Television: ESPN+, ESPNU, ESPN2

2024–25 Southland Conference men's basketball standings
	Conf.				Overall
Team	W		L	PCT	W		L	PCT
McNeese †	19	–	1	.950	28	–	7	.800
Lamar	14	–	6	.700	20	–	13	.606
Nicholls	13	–	7	.650	20	–	13	.606
Northwestern State	12	–	8	.600	16	–	16	.500
Texas A&M–Corpus Christi	12	–	8	.600	20	–	14	.588
Southeastern Louisiana	12	–	8	.600	18	–	14	.563
Incarnate Word	9	–	11	.450	19	–	17	.528
Houston Christian	9	–	11	.450	12	–	20	.375
UT Rio Grande Valley	8	–	12	.400	16	–	15	.516
Stephen F. Austin	7	–	13	.350	14	–	17	.452
East Texas A&M*	3	–	17	.150	5	–	26	.161
New Orleans	2	–	18	.100	4	–	27	.129
† 2025 Southland tournament winner * ineligible for the 2025 NCAA tournament due to transition period

The 2025 Southland Conference men's basketball tournament was the postseason men's basketball tournament for the 2024–25 season of the Southland Conference. The tournament was held March 9–12, 2025, at The Legacy Center in Lake Charles, Louisiana. The tournament winner, McNeese, received the conference's automatic invitation to the 2025 NCAA tournament.

== Seeds ==
The top eight teams in the conference standings qualified for the tournament. Teams were seeded by record within the conference, with a tie–breaker system to seed teams with identical conference records. The top two seeds received double byes into the semifinals. The No. 3 and No. 4 seeds received single byes to the quarterfinals.

Seed	School	Conference	Tiebreaker 1	Tiebreaker 2
1	McNeese	19–1		
2	Lamar	14–6		
3	Nicholls	13–7		
4	Northwestern State	12–8	8–2 vs. McNeese/Nicholls/UIW/HCU/UNO	
5	Texas A&M–Corpus Christi	12–8	6–4 vs. McNeese/Nicholls/UIW/HCU/UNO	2–0 vs. Southeastern Louisiana
6	Southeastern Louisiana	12–8	6–4 vs. McNeese/Nicholls/UIW/HCU/UNO	0–2 vs. Texas A&M–Corpus Christi
7	Incarnate Word	9–11	1–1 vs. Lamar	
8	Houston Christian	9–11	0–2 vs. Lamar	
DNQ	UT Rio Grande Valley	8–12		
DNQ	Stephen F. Austin	7–13		
DNQ	East Texas A&M	3–17		
DNQ	New Orleans	2–18		

== Schedule ==
Session	Game	Time*	Matchup^{#}	Score	Television	Attendance
First round – Sunday March 9, 2025
1	1	5:00 pm	No. 5 Texas A&M–Corpus Christi vs. No. 8 Houston Christian	62–48	ESPN+	902
1	2	7:30 pm	No. 6 Southeastern Louisiana vs. No. 7 Incarnate Word	67–71^{OT}	ESPN+	902
Quarterfinals – Monday, March 10, 2025
2	3	5:00 pm	No. 4 Northwestern State vs. No. 5 Texas A&M–Corpus Christi	66–63	ESPN+	1,310
2	4	7:30 pm	No. 3 Nicholls vs. No. 7 Incarnate Word	74–70^{OT}	ESPN+	1,310
Semifinals – Tuesday, March 11, 2025
3	5	6:00 pm	No. 1 McNeese vs. No. 4 Northwestern State	83–64	ESPNU	3,782
3	6	8:30 pm	No. 2 Lamar vs. No. 3 Nicholls	58–55	ESPN+	3,782
Championship – Wednesday, March 12, 2025
4	7	4:00 pm	No. 1 McNeese vs. No. 2 Lamar	63–54	ESPN2	4,106
*Game times in CDT. #-Rankings denote tournament seeding.

== Bracket ==
First round Sunday, March 9 ESPN+
5	Texas A&M–Corpus Christi	62
8	Houston Christian	48
6	Southeastern Louisiana	67
7	Incarnate Word	71^{OT}

Quarterfinals; Monday, March 10; ESPN+
4	Northwestern State	66
5	Texas A&M–Corpus Christi	63
3	Nicholls	74^{OT}
7	Incarnate Word	70

Semifinals; Tuesday, March 11; ESPNU/ESPN+
1	McNeese	83
4	Northwestern State	64
2	Lamar	58
3	Nicholls	55

Championship; Wednesday, March 12; ESPN2
1	McNeese	63
2	Lamar	54

== Game summaries ==
=== First round ===
ESPN+

March 9
5:00 pm

No. 5 Texas A&M–Corpus Christi 62, No. 8 Houston Christian 48
Scoring by half: 34–24, 28–24
Pts: G. Clark – 22; Rebs: G. Clark – 11; Asts: Tied - 4 (L. Torbor, K. Parker)	Pts: J. Mackey – 17; Rebs: D. Samuels – 4 Asts: E. Brooks – 4
Texas A&M Corpus Christi advances to Southland Quarterfinals

The Legacy Center – Lake Charles, LA
Attendance: 902
Referees: Joe Wilbert III, Brent Dugas, Eric Kronebusch

ESPN+

March 9
7:30 pm

No. 6 seed Southeastern Louisiana 67, No. 7 seed Incarnate Word 71 (OT)
Scoring by half: 25–32, 33–26 Overtime: 9–13
Pts: Tied – 20 (D. Bailey, J. Anderson); Rebs: M. Glover – 11; Asts: J. Anderson – 7	Pts: S. Hines, Jr. – 27; Rebs: Tied – 8 (J. Elyzee, S. Hines, Jr.); Asts: S. Hines, Jr. – 2
Incarnate Word advances to Southland Quarterfinals

The Legacy Center – Lake Charles, LA
Attendance: 902
Referees: Danny Chance, Derek Schulte, Garrett Theriot

=== Quarterfinals ===
ESPN+

March 10
5:00 pm

No. 4 Northwestern State 66, No. 5 Texas A&M–Corpus Christi 63
Scoring by half: 38–28, 28–35
Pts: L. Bettis – 17; Rebs: W. Williams – 13; Asts: A. Patterson – 5	Pts: D. Wright-Forde – 15; Rebs: G. Clark – 7 Asts: J. Walker – 4
Northwestern State advances to Southland Semifinals

The Legacy Center – Lake Charles, LA
Attendance: 0
Referees: Danny Chance, Randal Anders and Shaun Seales

ESPN+

March 11
7:30 pm

No. 3 Nicholls 74, No. 7 Incarnate Word 70 (OT)
Scoring by half: 28–27, 35–36 Overtime: 11–7
Pts: J. West, Jr. – 17; Rebs: J. Searles – 11; Asts: T. English – 3	Pts: D. Hayman – 29; Rebs: L. Sabally – 8 Asts: D. Bailey – 5
Nicholls advances to Southland Semifinals

The Legacy Center – Lake Charles, LA
Attendance: 1,310
Referees: Derek Schulte, Eric Kronebusch and John Jenkins Jr.

=== Semifinals ===
ESPNU

March 11
7:00 pm

Box

No. 1 McNeese 83, No. 4 Northwestern State 64
Scoring by half: 25-42, 39-41
Pts: Garcia 24; Rebs: Charles 9 Asts: Copeland, Murray 5	Pts: Thomas 19; Rebs: Williams 10; Asts: Patterson 6
McNeese advances to Southland Finals

The Legacy Center – Lake Charles, LA
Attendance: 0
Referees: Brent Dugas, Stephen Orkus, Jr., Bharat Ramnanan

ESPN+

March 11
9:30 pm

Box

No. 2 Lamar 58, No. 3 Nicholls 55
Scoring by half: 28-33, 30-22
Pts: Marmolejos 17; Rebs: White 9 Asts: Jackson 5	Pts: Brown III 17; Rebs: Robinson 8 Asts: Brown II, Ireland, Robinson 3
Lamar advances to Southland Finals

The Legacy Center – Lake Charles, LA
Attendance: 3,782
Referees: Rodrick Dixon, Shaun Seales, Lucas Santos

=== Finals ===
ESPN2

March 12
5:00 pm

Box

No. 1 McNeese 63, Lamar 54
Scoring by half: 33-30, 30-24
Pts: Copeland 18; Rebs: Charles 7 Asts: Copeland 4	Pts: Marmolejos 18; Rebs: Marmolejos, Holifield 9 Asts: Jackson 2
McNeese wins Southland Final

The Legacy Center – Lake Charles, LA
Attendance: 4,106
Referees: Stephen Orkus Jr, Bharat Ramnanan, Lucas Santos

== Awards and honors ==
2025 Southland Conference Men's Basketball All-Tournament Team
- (MVP) Javohn Garcia (McNeese)
- Quadir Copeland (McNeese)
- Alexis Marmolejos (Lamar)
- Adam Hamilton (Lamar)
- Micah Thomas (Northwestern State)

== See also ==
2025 Southland Conference women's basketball tournament
