= 2024–25 Stephen F. Austin Lumberjacks basketball team =

American college basketball season

2024–25 Stephen F. Austin Lumberjacks basketball
- Conference: Southland Conference
- Record: 14–17 (7–13 SLC)
- Head coach: Kyle Keller (Fired) (9th season; first 19 games); Tony Jasick (interim, rest of season)
- Assistant coaches: Jean Prioleau; Dallas Cameron
- Home arena: William R. Johnson Coliseum (Capacity: 7,203)

2024–25 Southland Conference men's basketball standings
	Conf.				Overall
Team	W		L	PCT	W		L	PCT
McNeese †	19	–	1	.950	28	–	7	.800
Lamar	14	–	6	.700	20	–	13	.606
Nicholls	13	–	7	.650	20	–	13	.606
Northwestern State	12	–	8	.600	16	–	16	.500
Texas A&M–Corpus Christi	12	–	8	.600	20	–	14	.588
Southeastern Louisiana	12	–	8	.600	18	–	14	.563
Incarnate Word	9	–	11	.450	19	–	17	.528
Houston Christian	9	–	11	.450	12	–	20	.375
UT Rio Grande Valley	8	–	12	.400	16	–	15	.516
Stephen F. Austin	7	–	13	.350	14	–	17	.452
East Texas A&M*	3	–	17	.150	5	–	26	.161
New Orleans	2	–	18	.100	4	–	27	.129
† 2025 Southland tournament winner * ineligible for the 2025 NCAA tournament due to transition period

The 2024–25 Stephen F. Austin Lumberjacks basketball team represented Stephen F. Austin State University during the 2024–25 NCAA Division I men's basketball season. The Lumberjacks, led by interim head coach Tony Jasick, played their home games at the William R. Johnson Coliseum in Nacogdoches, Texas as members of the Southland Conference. Former head coach Kyle Keller, who was in his 9th season at SFU, was relieved of his duties on January 22, 2025. The Lumberjacks finished the 2024–25 season 14–17, 7–13 in conference play to finish in tenth place. Failing to qualify for the SLC tournament, the Lumberjacks' season ended with a 64–95 loss to conference regular season champion, McNeese.

== Previous season ==
The Lumberjacks finished the 2023–24 season 18–15, 10–10 in WAC play to finish in a tie for sixth place. They defeated Abilene Christian, before falling to UT Arlington in the quarterfinals. This season would mark their last as members of the Western Athletic Conference, as they rejoined the Southland Conference after a three-year absence.

== Preseason polls ==
=== Southland Conference Poll ===
The Southland Conference released its preseason poll on October 16, 2024. Receiving 208 votes overall, the Lumberjacks were picked to finish second in the conference.

Predicted finish	Team	Votes (1st place)
1	McNeese	242 (21)
2	Stephen F. Austin	208
3	Nicholls	205 (3)
4	Texas A&M–Corpus Christi	191
5	Lamar	143
6	Southeastern	121
7	Incarnate Word	117
8	UT Rio Grande Valley	112
9	Northwestern State	90
10	Texas A&M–Commerce	54
10	New Orleans	54
12	Houston Christian	48

=== Preseason All Conference ===
Ken Thompson was selected as a preseason 2nd team all-conference team member.

== Roster ==
2024–25 Stephen F. Austin Lumberjacks men's basketball team
Players
Coaches

Pos.	#	Name	Height	Weight	Year	Previous school	Hometown
G	0	Myles Jenkins	6 ft 4 in (1.93 m)	218 lb (99 kg)	Jr	Anderson	Lexington, South Carolina
G	1	Matt Hayman	6 ft 5 in (1.96 m)	204 lb (93 kg)	Sr	Hinds Community College	Delhi, Louisiana
G	2	DaeVeon Scott	6 ft 3 in (1.91 m)	175 lb (79 kg)	RS So	Keller Central High School	Fort Worth, Texas
G	3	Chris Johnson	6 ft 5 in (1.96 m)	196 lb (89 kg)	So	Texas	Houston, Texas
G	4	Ethan Mayes	6 ft 1 in (1.85 m)	190 lb (86 kg)	Sr	Tyler Junior College	Houston, Texas
G	5	Keon Thompson	6 ft 1 in (1.85 m)	198 lb (90 kg)	Jr	UMass	Merrillville, Indiana
G	7	Keenan Emmanuel	6 ft 0 in (1.83 m)	175 lb (79 kg)	Fr	Academy of Central Florida	Mississauga, Ontario
F	8	Keith Lamar	6 ft 7 in (2.01 m)	212 lb (96 kg)	GS	Florida A&M	Stockbridge, Georgia
G/F	10	Dominic Pangonis	6 ft 7 in (2.01 m)	204 lb (93 kg)	Fr	Polaris Prep	Toronto, Ontario
G/F	11	Chrishawn Christmas	6 ft 5 in (1.96 m)	210 lb (95 kg)	Jr	Panola College	Gary, Indiana
F	13	Thierno Sylla	7 ft 0 in (2.13 m)	217 lb (98 kg)	Jr	UCF	Conakry, Guinea
G	14	Luke Stansbury	6 ft 2 in (1.88 m)	185 lb (84 kg)	RS Fr	Greenwood High School	Bowling Green, Kentucky
F	22	Nana Antwi-Boasiako	6 ft 9 in (2.06 m)	235 lb (107 kg)	Sr	Nacogdoches High School	Nacogdoches, Texas
F	23	Clayton Southwick	6 ft 8 in (2.03 m)	235 lb (107 kg)	Sr	Snow College	Palmer, Alaska
F	32	Juhlawnei Stone	6 ft 7 in (2.01 m)	235 lb (107 kg)	Jr	California Baptist	Lancaster, California

Head coach

- Kyle Keller (Louisiana Tech)

Assistant coach(es)

- Tony Jasick (Mars Hill)
- Dallas Cameron (Stephen F. Austin)
- Jean Prioleau (Fordham)

Legend

- (C) Team captain
- (S) Suspended
- (I) Ineligible
- (W) Walk-on
- Injured
- Current redshirt

Roster
Last update: December 2, 2024

== Schedule and results ==
Date time, TV	Rank^{#}	Opponent^{#}	Result	Record	High points	High rebounds	High assists	Site (attendance) city, state
Regular season
November 4, 2024*; 7:30 p.m., ESPN+		Dallas	W 85–51	1–0	17 – C. Johnson	9 – T. Sylla	3 – C. Johnson	William R. Johnson Coliseum (1,632); Nacogdoches, TX
November 10, 2024*; 1:00 p.m., ESPN+		at Drake	L 51–66	1–1	14 – C. Christmas	8 – C. Christmas	3 – M. Hayman	Knapp Center (2,627); Des Moines, IA
November 12, 2024*; 6:30 p.m., ESPN+		LeTourneau	W 87–68	2–1	17 – K. Lamar	10 – J. Stone	4 – D. Scott	William R. Johnson Coliseum (1,480); Nacogdoches, TX
November 12, 2024*; 6:30 p.m., ESPN+		at Arkansas State	L 49–59	2–2	12 – M. Hayman	12 – N. Antwi–Boasiako	3 – C. Christmas	First National Bank Arena (4,129); Jonesboro, AR
November 21, 2024*; 6:30 p.m., ESPN+		Presbyterian; Axe'Em Classic	L 55–58	2–3	12 – M. Hayman	13 – J. Stone	2 – N. Antwi–Boasiako	William R. Johnson Coliseum (1,469); Nacogdoches, TX
November 22, 2024*; 5:00 p.m., ESPN+		Monmouth; Axe'Em Classic	W 72–67	3–3	24 – N. Antwi-Boasiako	9 – N. Antwi-Boasiako	5 – M. Hayman	William R. Johnson Coliseum (1,438); Nacogdoches, TX
November 23, 2024*; 6:00 p.m., ESPN+		Youngstown State; Axe'Em Classic	W 64–57	4–3	14 – N. Antwi-Boasiako	8 – C. Christmas	5 – M. Hayman	William R. Johnson Coliseum (1,925); Nacogdoches, TX
November 29, 2024*; 6:30 p.m., ESPN+		at Louisiana–Monroe	W 68–60	5–3	27 – M. Hayman	7 – N. Antwi-Boasiako	4 – J. Stone	Fant–Ewing Coliseum (1,336); Monroe, LA
December 5, 2024; 6:30 p.m., ESPN+		at UT Rio Grande Valley	L 65–68	5–4 (0–1)	20 – K. Thompson	7 – N. Antwi-Boasiako	4 – K. Thompson	UTRGV Fieldhouse (878); Edinburg, TX
December 7, 2024; 3:30 p.m., ESPN+		at Texas A&M–Corpus Christi	L 48–67	5–5 (0–2)	15 – N. Antwi-Boasiako	10 – N. Antwi-Boasiako	3 – M. Hayman	American Bank Center (1,138); Corpus Christi, TX
December 15, 2024*; 5:00 p.m., BTN		at No. 12 Oregon	L 61–79	5–6	17 – M. Hayman	7 – C. Christmas	3 – K. Thompson	Matthew Knight Arena (5,792); Eugene, OR
December 20, 2024*; 6:30 p.m., ESPN+		Texas Wesleyan	W 82–56	6–6	21 – K. Thompson	10 – N. Antwi-Boasiako	5 – M. Hayman	William R. Johnson Coliseum (1,379); Nacogdoches, TX
December 31, 2024*; 3:30 p.m., ESPN+		at Abilene Christian	W 62–57	7–6	24 – C. Christmas	14 – C. Christmas	2 – K. Thompson	Moody Coliseum (1,064); Abilene, TX
January 4, 2025; 5:00 p.m., ESPN+		Incarnate Word	L 49–55	7–7 (0–2)	17 – K. Thompson	8 – J. Stone	3 – K. Thompson	William R. Johnson Coliseum (1,803); Nacogdoches, TX
January 6, 2025; 6:30 p.m., ESPN+		Houston Christian	L 73–83	7–8 (0–4)	19 – K. Thompson	6 – J. Stone	3 – C. Christmas	William R. Johnson Coliseum (1,270); Nacogdoches, TX
January 11, 2025; 6:00 p.m., ESPN+		at Lamar	W 72–63	8–8 (1–4)	18 – M. Hayman	8 – M. Hayman	5 – K. Thompson	Neches Arena; Beaumont, TX
January 13, 2025; 6:30 p.m., ESPN+		Southeastern Louisiana	L 59–66	8–9 (1–5)	14 – K. Thompson	7 – M. Hayman	3 – D. Pangonis	William R. Johnson Coliseum (1,609); Nacogdoches, TX
January 18, 2025; 3:00 p.m., ESPN+		at Nicholls	L 61–73	8–10 (1–6)	12 – C. Christmas	9 – C. Christmas	3 – M. Hayman	Stopher Gymnasium (566); Thibodaux, LA
January 20, 2025; 6:00 p.m., ESPN+		at McNeese	L 59–79	8–11 (1–7)	15 – N. Antwi-Boasiako	6 – N. Antwi-Boasiako	5 – M. Hayman	The Legacy Center (2,929); Lake Charles, LA
January 25, 2025; 5:00 p.m., ESPN+		Northwestern State	L 54–57 ^{OT}	8–12 (1–8)	15 – M. Hayman	9 – K. Thompson	7 – K. Thompson	William R. Johnson Coliseum (1,999); Nacogdoches, TX
January 27, 2025; 6:30 p.m., ESPN+		East Texas A&M	W 79–72	9–12 (2–8)	21 – M. Hayman	7 – N. Antwi-Boasiako	10 – K. Thompson	William R. Johnson Coliseum (1,225); Nacogdoches, TX
February 1, 2025; 2:00 p.m., ESPN+		Lamar	L 62–67	9–13 (2–9)	18 – K. Thompson	7 – N. Antwi-Boasiako	4 – K. Thompson	William R. Johnson Coliseum (1,674); Nacogdoches, TX
February 3, 2025; 6:30 p.m., ESPN+		at New Orleans	W 88–85 ^{OT}	10–13 (3–9)	28 – K. Rowbatham	6 – D. Pagonis	5 – K. Thompson	Lakefront Arena (455); New Orleans, LA
February 8, 2025; 5:00 p.m., ESPN+		Texas A&M–Corpus Christi	W 78–64	11–13 (4–9)	20 – N. Antwi-Boasiako	9 – K. Thompson	9 – K. Thompson	William R. Johnson Coliseum (1,371); Nacogdoches, TX
February 10, 2025; 6:30 p.m., ESPN+		UT Rio Grande Valley	W 85–75	12–13 (5–9)	20 – K. Thompson	12 – K. Thompson	6 – K. Thompson	William R. Johnson Coliseum (1,408); Nacogdoches, TX
February 15, 2025; 3:30 p.m., ESPN+		at Northwestern State	W 70–68	13–13 (6–9)	25 – M. Hayman	7 – K. Thompson	4 – M. Hayman	Prather Coliseum (1,997); Natchitoches, LA
February 17, 2025; 6:30 p.m., ESPN+		at East Texas A&M	W 76–74	14–13 (7–9)	23 – M. Hayman	11 – C. Christmas	4 – M. Hayman	The Field House (488); Commerce, TX
February 22, 2025; 5:00 p.m., ESPN+		at Incarnate Word	L 61–63	14–14 (7–10)	23 – N. Hayman	8 – N. Antwi-Boasiako	2 – K. Thompson	McDermott Center (271); San Antonio, TX
February 24, 2025; 7:00 p.m., ESPN+		at Houston Christian	L 56–72	14–15 (7–11)	16 – K. Thompson	6 – K. Thompson	2 – C. Christmas	Sharp Gymnasium (894); Houston, TX
March 1, 2025; 5:00 p.m., ESPN+		Nicholls	L 70–94	14–16 (7–12)	16 – M. Jenkins	7 – K. Thompson	4 – M. Hayman	William R. Johnson Coliseum (1,691); Nacogdoches, TX
March 3, 2025; 6:30 p.m., ESPNU		McNeese	L 64–95	14–17 (7–13)	15 – K. Thompson	5 – K. Thompson	5 – M. Hayman	William R. Johnson Coliseum (2.924); Nacogdoches, TX
*Non-conference game. ^{#}Rankings from AP poll. (#) Tournament seedings in parentheses. All times are in Central.

== See also ==
2024–25 Stephen F. Austin Ladyjacks basketball team
