= 2024–25 Nicholls Colonels men's basketball team =

American college basketball season

2024–25 Nicholls Colonels men's basketball
- Conference: Southland Conference
- Record: 20–13 (13–7 Southland)
- Head coach: Tevon Saddler (2nd season)
- Assistant coaches: Dayshawn Wells; Stephen Rodgers; Jovan Coleman
- Home arena: Stopher Gymnasium

2024–25 Southland Conference men's basketball standings
	Conf.				Overall
Team	W		L	PCT	W		L	PCT
McNeese †	19	–	1	.950	28	–	7	.800
Lamar	14	–	6	.700	20	–	13	.606
Nicholls	13	–	7	.650	20	–	13	.606
Northwestern State	12	–	8	.600	16	–	16	.500
Texas A&M–Corpus Christi	12	–	8	.600	20	–	14	.588
Southeastern Louisiana	12	–	8	.600	18	–	14	.563
Incarnate Word	9	–	11	.450	19	–	17	.528
Houston Christian	9	–	11	.450	12	–	20	.375
UT Rio Grande Valley	8	–	12	.400	16	–	15	.516
Stephen F. Austin	7	–	13	.350	14	–	17	.452
East Texas A&M*	3	–	17	.150	5	–	26	.161
New Orleans	2	–	18	.100	4	–	27	.129
† 2025 Southland tournament winner * ineligible for the 2025 NCAA tournament due to transition period

The 2024–25 Nicholls State Colonels men's basketball team represented Nicholls State University in the 2024–25 NCAA Division I men's basketball season. The Colonels, led by second-year head coach Tevon Saddler, played their home games at Stopher Gymnasium in Thibodaux, Louisiana as members of the Southland Conference.

== Previous season ==
The Colonels finished the 2023–24 season 20–14, 13–5 in Southland play to finish in third place. They defeated Texas A&M–Commerce and Texas A&M–Corpus Christi, before falling to McNeese in the Southland tournament championship game.

== Preseason polls ==
=== Southland Conference Poll ===
The Southland Conference released its preseason poll on October 16, 2024. Receiving 205 votes overall and 3 first place votes, the Colonels were picked to finish third in the conference.

Predicted finish	Team	Votes (1st place)
1	McNeese	242 (21)
2	Stephen F. Austin	208
3	Nicholls	205 (3)
4	Texas A&M–Corpus Christi	191
5	Lamar	143
6	Southeastern	121
7	Incarnate Word	117
8	UT Rio Grande Valley	112
9	Northwestern State	90
10	Texas A&M–Commerce	54
10	New Orleans	54
12	Houston Christian	48

=== Preseason All Conference ===
Jamal West Jr. was named as a first team preseason all-conference team member. Robert Brown III was named as a second team preseason all-conference team member.

== Roster ==
2024–25 Nicholls Colonels men's basketball team
Players
Coaches

Pos.	#	Name	Height	Weight	Year	Previous school	Hometown
F	0	Mekhi Collins	6 ft 8 in (2.03 m)	225 lb (102 kg)	Sr	Faith Family Academy	Cedar Hill, Texas
G	1	Trae English	6 ft 0 in (1.83 m)	175 lb (79 kg)	RS Jr	McNeese	Baltimore, Maryland
G	2	Robert Brown III	6 ft 4 in (1.93 m)	190 lb (86 kg)	Sr	Butler Community College	Albany, New York
G	3	Jaylen Searles	6 ft 8 in (2.03 m)	195 lb (88 kg)	Sr	Utah Tech	Everett, Washington
F	5	Sincere Malone	6 ft 8 in (2.03 m)	210 lb (95 kg)	Jr	Eastern Illinois	Chicago, Illinois
F	6	Brian Myles	6 ft 7 in (2.01 m)	200 lb (91 kg)	Sr	Prairie View A&M	Shreveport, Louisiana
G	7	Caleb Robinson	6 ft 4 in (1.93 m)	200 lb (91 kg)	GS	Gardner–Webb	Lake Arthur, Louisiana
G	8	Chad Clark Jr.	6 ft 6 in (1.98 m)	195 lb (88 kg)	Fr	East Ascension High School	Gonzales, Louisiana
G	9	Michael Gray Jr.	6 ft 2 in (1.88 m)	200 lb (91 kg)	Jr	George Mason	Fredericksburg, Virginia
G	10	Ike Cornish	6 ft 6 in (1.98 m)	190 lb (86 kg)	RS Jr	Ohio	Baltimore, Maryland
G	13	Byron Ireland	6 ft 2 in (1.88 m)	190 lb (86 kg)	Sr	Maine	Annapolis, Maryland
G	14	Roy Recasner	6 ft 1 in (1.85 m)	175 lb (79 kg)	Fr	Woodlawn High School	Baton Rouge, Louisiana
F	15	Jamal West Jr.	6 ft 6 in (1.98 m)	225 lb (102 kg)	Sr	Clarendon College	Baltimore, Maryland
G	21	Dwayne Perkins Jr.	6 ft 0 in (1.83 m)	150 lb (68 kg)	Fr	Salmen High School	Slidell, Louisiana
G	22	Emarion Ellis	6 ft 5 in (1.96 m)	200 lb (91 kg)	Jr	Bradley	Davenport, Iowa
G	24	Quinn Strander	5 ft 10 in (1.78 m)	175 lb (79 kg)	GS	E.D. White Catholic High School	Thibodaux, Louisiana

Head coach

- Tevon Saddler (Nicholls State)

Assistant coach(es)

- Dayshawn Wells (Bowie State)
- Stephen Rodgers (Coastal Carolina)
- Jovan Coleman (Mississippi State)

Legend

- (C) Team captain
- (S) Suspended
- (I) Ineligible
- (W) Walk-on
- Injured
- Current redshirt

Roster
Last update: December 3, 2024

== Schedule and results ==
Date time, TV	Rank^{#}	Opponent^{#}	Result	Record	High points	High rebounds	High assists	Site (attendance) city, state
Regular season
November 4, 2024*; 8:00 p.m.		at New Mexico	L 84–91	0–1	23 – R. Brown III	9 – J. West, Jr.	8 – T. English	The Pit (10,609); Albuquerque, NM
November 8, 2024*; 6:30 p.m., ESPN+		South Alabama	L 64–70	0–2	18 – I. Cornish	6 – B. Myles	4 – T. English	Stopher Gymnasium (644); Thibodaux, LA
November 9, 2024*; 3:00 p.m., ESPN+		Mississippi University for Women	W 93–44	1–2	21 – R. Brown III	8 – M. Collins	4 – J. Searles	Stopher Gymnasium (234); Thibodaux, LA
November 14, 2024*; 6:00 p.m., ESPN+		at Northern Kentucky	W 61–59	2–2	15 – B. Ireland	12 – M. Collins	4 – B. Ireland	Truist Arena (2,345); Highland Heights, KY
November 15, 2024*; 6:00 p.m., ESPN+		at No. 17 Cincinnati	L 49–86	2–3	12 – J. West, Jr	6 – J. West, Jr	4 – T. English	Fifth Third Arena (10,485); Cincinnati, OH
November 20, 2024*; 6:30 p.m., ESPN+		Towson	L 64–70	2–4	24 – B. Ireland	7 – S. Malone	1 – T. English	Stopher Gymnasium (655); Thibodaux, LA
November 25, 2024*; 6:30 p.m., ESPN+		Mississippi College	W 79–35	3–4	15 – B. Ireland	7 – Tied	4 – J. Searles	Stopher Gymnasium (345); Thibodaux, LA
November 30, 2024*; 2:00 p.m., ESPN+		at Louisiana	W 76–75	4–4	19 – M. Gray Jr.	9 – J. West Jr.	3 – B. Ireland	Cajundome (1,296); Lafayette, LA
December 5, 2024; 6:30 p.m., ESPN+		Southeastern Louisiana	W 67–64	5–4 (1–0)	15 – B. Ireland	10 – J. West Jr.	3 – B. Ireland	Stopher Gymnasium (587); Thibodaux, LA
December 7, 2024; 1:00 p.m., ESPN+		New Orleans	W 73–70	6–4 (2–0)	22 – B. Ireland	11 – M. Collins	3 – B. Ireland	Stopher Gymnasium (544); Thibodaux, LA
December 10, 2024; 6:30 p.m., ESPN+		Southern–New Orleans	W 110–66	7–4	28 – R. Brown III	12 – M. Collins	4 – Tied	Stopher Gymnasium (302); Thibodaux, LA
December 18, 2024*; 8:00 p.m., ESPN+		at No. 13 Gonzaga	L 72–102	7–5	16 – B. Ireland	4 – S. Malone	6 – B. Ireland	McCarthey Athletic Center (6,000); Spokane, WA
December 30, 2024*; 9:00 p.m., ESPN+		at Seattle	W 71–69	8–5	19 – B. Ireland	13 – M. Collins	5 – T. English	Climate Pledge Arena (840); Seattle, WA
January 4, 2025; 3:30 p.m., ESPN+		at Northwestern State	L 66–68	8–6 (2–1)	18 – M. Gray Jr.	8 – M. Collins	6 – B. Ireland	Prather Coliseum (245); Natchitoches, LA
January 6, 2025; 6:30 p.m., ESPN+		at East Texas A&M	W 83–61	9–6 (3–1)	17 – Tied	8 – J. West Jr.	5 – B. Ireland	The Field House (271); Commerce, TX
January 11, 2025; 4:00 p.m., ESPN+		at McNeese	L 71–80	9–7 (3–2)	16 – R. Brown III	8 – J. Searles	2 – T. English	The Legacy Center (4,032); Lake Charles, LA
January 13, 2025; 6:30 p.m., ESPN+		at Incarnate Word	W 88–82	10–7 (4–2)	37 – R. Brown III	7 – Tied	4 – B. Ireland	McDermott Center (266); San Antonio, TX
January 18, 2025; 3:00 p.m., ESPN+		Stephen F. Austin	W 73–61	11–7 (5–2)	17 – B. Ireland	5 – J. Searles	4 – B. Ireland	Stopher Gymnasium (566); Thibodaux, LA
January 20, 2025; 1:00 p.m., ESPN+		Lamar	L 74–78	11–8 (5–3)	22 – J. West Jr.	10 – J. West Jr.	3 – B. Ireland	Stopher Gymnasium (301); Thibodaux, LA
January 25, 2025; 3:30 p.m., ESPN+		at Texas A&M–Corpus Christi	L 57–61	11–9 (5–4)	20 – J. West Jr.	8 – J. West Jr.	5 – T. English	American Bank Center (2,157); Corpus Christi, TX
January 27, 2025; 6:30 p.m., ESPN+		at UT Rio Grande Valley	W 82–75	12–9 (6–4)	24 – R. Brown III	5 – Tied	4 – B. Ireland	UTRGV Fieldhouse (1,311); Edinburg, TX
February 1, 2025; 3:30 p.m., ESPN+		McNeese	W 71–63	13–9 (7–4)	20 – M. Gray, Jr.	10 – J. Searles	3 – J. Searles	Stopher Gymnasium (877); Thibodaux, LA
February 3, 2025; 6:30 p.m., ESPN+		Houston Christian	W 75–67	14–9 (8–4)	25 – M. Gray, Jr.	13 – J. West, Jr.	3 – B. Ireland	Stopher Gymnasium (781); Thibodaux, LA
February 8, 2025; 3:30 p.m., ESPN+		East Texas A&M	W 81–65	15–9 (9–4)	20 – M. Gray, Jr.	12 – J. Searles	2 – M. Gray, Jr.	Stopher Gymnasium (567); Thibodaux, LA
February 10, 2025; 6:30 p.m., ESPN+		Northwestern State	L 60–72	15–10 (9–5)	19 – M. Gray, Jr.	7 – S. Malone	2 – M. Gray, Jr.	Stopher Gymnasium (522); Thibodaux, LA
February 15, 2025; 3:30 p.m., ESPN+		at Southeastern Louisiana	L 81–84	15–11 (9–6)	28 – R. Brown III	11 – S. Malone	8 – T. English	Pride Roofing University Center (927); Hammond, LA
February 17, 2025; 6:30 p.m., ESPN+		at New Orleans	W 78–62	16–11 (10–6)	19 – B. Ireland	13 – J. West, Jr.	8 – T. English	Lakefront Arena (738); New Orleans, LA
February 22, 2025; 3:00 p.m., ESPN+		UT Rio Grande Valley	W 93–84	17–11 (11–6)	22 – J. West, Jr.	12 – J. West, Jr.	3 – J. Searles	Stopher Gymnasium (600); Thibodaux, LA
February 24, 2025; 6:30 p.m., ESPN+		Texas A&M–Corpus Christi	W 71–69	18–11 (12–6)	22 – M. Gray, Jr.	8 – M. Collins	2 – M. Gray, Jr.	Stopher Gymnasium (623); Thibodaux, LA
March 1, 2025; 5:00 p.m., ESPN+		at Stephen F. Austin	W 94–70	19–11 (13–6)	25 – R. Brown III	7 – S. Malone	10 – S. Malone	William R. Johnson Coliseum (1,691); Nacogdoches, TX
March 3, 2025; 7:00 p.m., ESPN+		at Lamar	L 53–65	19–12 (13–7)	19 – J. West, Jr.	9 – C. Robinson	4 – T, English	Neches Arena (1,923); Beaumont, TX
Southland tournament
March 10, 2025; 7:30 pm, ESPN+	(3)	vs. (7) Incarnate Word; Quarterfinals	W 74–70 ^{OT}	20–12	17 – J. West, Jr.	11 – J. Searles	3 – T. English	The Legacy Center (1,310); Lake Charles, LA
March 11, 2025; 8:30 pm, ESPN+	(3)	vs. (2) Lamar; Semifinals	L 55–58	20–13	17 – R. Brown III	8 – C. Robinson	3 – Tied	The Legacy Center (3,782); Lake Charles, LA
*Non-conference game. ^{#}Rankings from AP poll. (#) Tournament seedings in parentheses. All times are in Central.

== Conference awards and honors ==
=== Weekly awards ===
Weekly honors
Honors	Player	Position	Date awarded	Ref.
SLC Men's Basketball Player of the Week	Michael Gray Jr.	G	December 2, 2024	
SLC Men's Basketball Player of the Week	Robert Brown III	G	January 20, 2025	
SLC Men's Basketball Player of the Week	Jaylen Searles	G	February 3, 2025	

== See also ==
- 2024–25 Nicholls Colonels women's basketball team
