= 2024–25 Houston Christian Huskies men's basketball team =

American college basketball season

2024–25 Houston Christian Huskies men's basketball
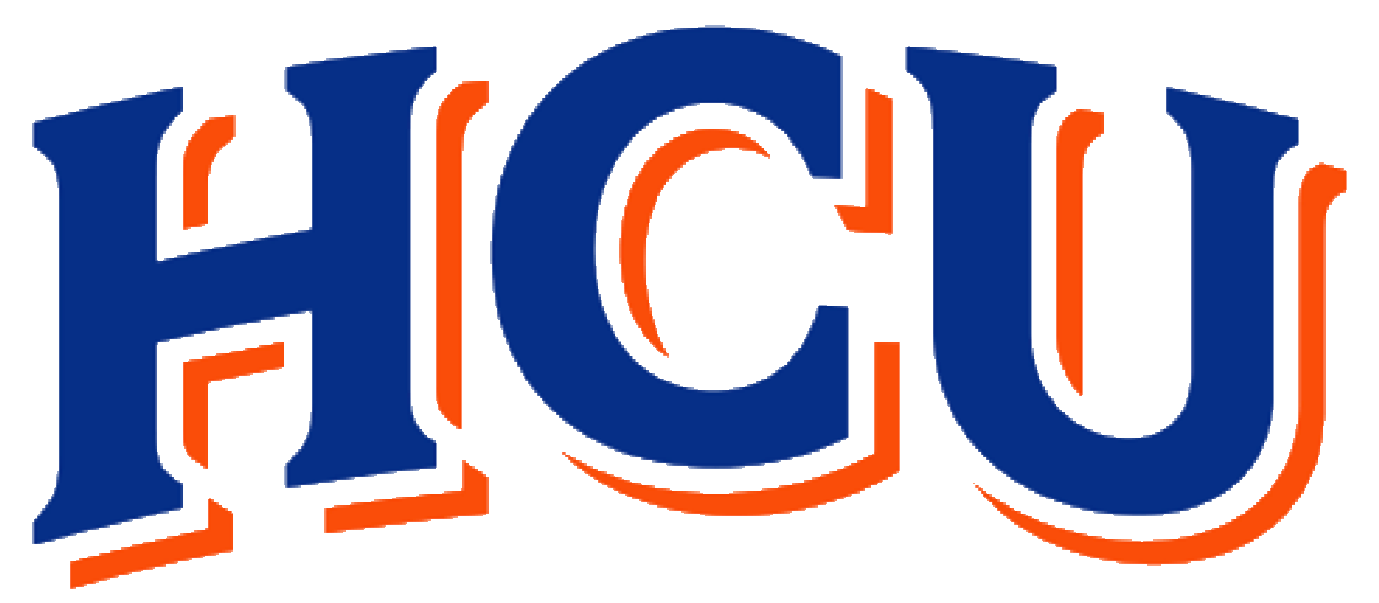
- Conference: Southland Conference
- Record: 12–20 (9–11 Southland)
- Head coach: Craig Doty (1st season)
- Assistant coaches: Evan Lavery; Cam Clark; Terry Johnson; Adam Cytlak; Nick Hilton
- Home arena: Sharp Gymnasium

2024–25 Southland Conference men's basketball standings
	Conf.				Overall
Team	W		L	PCT	W		L	PCT
McNeese †	19	–	1	.950	28	–	7	.800
Lamar	14	–	6	.700	20	–	13	.606
Nicholls	13	–	7	.650	20	–	13	.606
Northwestern State	12	–	8	.600	16	–	16	.500
Texas A&M–Corpus Christi	12	–	8	.600	20	–	14	.588
Southeastern Louisiana	12	–	8	.600	18	–	14	.563
Incarnate Word	9	–	11	.450	19	–	17	.528
Houston Christian	9	–	11	.450	12	–	20	.375
UT Rio Grande Valley	8	–	12	.400	16	–	15	.516
Stephen F. Austin	7	–	13	.350	14	–	17	.452
East Texas A&M*	3	–	17	.150	5	–	26	.161
New Orleans	2	–	18	.100	4	–	27	.129
† 2025 Southland tournament winner * ineligible for the 2025 NCAA tournament due to transition period

The 2024–25 Houston Christian Huskies men's basketball team represented Houston Christian University in the 2024–25 NCAA Division I men's basketball season. The Huskies, led by 1st-year head coach Craig Doty, played their home games at Sharp Gymnasium in Houston, Texas as members of the Southland Conference. The Huskies finished the 2024–25 season 12–20, 9–11 in a two way tie for seventh place in conference play. The Huskies' season ended with a first round SLC tournament loss to Texas A&M–Corpus Christi. HCU's win over Louisiana–Monroe was their first non-conference win over a D1 opponent since winning at Wake Forest in 2018.

== Previous season ==
The Huskies finished the 2023–24 season 6–23, 4–14 in Southland play to finish in a tie for eighth place. They failed to qualify for the Southland tournament, as only the top eight teams qualify, losing out on the tiebreaker.

On March 7, 2024, the school announced that they fired head coach Ron Cottrell, after leading the team for 33 years. On March 15, the school announced that they would be hiring Emporia State head coach Craig Doty as the team's new head coach.

== Preseason polls ==
=== Southland Conference Poll ===
The Southland Conference released its preseason poll on October 16, 2024. Receiving 143 votes overall, the Huskies were picked to finish twelfth in the conference.

Predicted finish	Team	Votes (1st place)
1	McNeese	242 (21)
2	Stephen F. Austin	208
3	Nicholls	205 (3)
4	Texas A&M–Corpus Christi	191
5	Lamar	143
6	Southeastern	121
7	Incarnate Word	117
8	UT Rio Grande Valley	112
9	Northwestern State	90
10	Texas A&M–Commerce	54
10	New Orleans	54
12	Houston Christian	48

=== Preseason All Conference ===
No Huskies were selected as members of a preseason all-conference team.

== Roster ==
2024–25 Houston Christian Huskies men's basketball team
Players
Coaches

Pos.	#	Name	Height	Weight	Year	Previous school	Hometown
G/F	0	Demari Williams	6 ft 5 in (1.96 m)	221 lb (100 kg)	RS So	Oral Roberts	Fulshear, Texas
G	1	Ivan Reynolds	6 ft 4 in (1.93 m)	209 lb (95 kg)	Sr	Jacksonville State	Pompano Beach, Florida
G	3	Julian Mackey	6 ft 2 in (1.88 m)	160 lb (73 kg)	Sr	Georgia State	Grayson, Georgia
G	4	Elijah Brooks	6 ft 3 in (1.91 m)	195 lb (88 kg)	Jr	North Dakota	Topeka, Kansas
G	5	D'Aundre Samuels	6 ft 2 in (1.88 m)	186 lb (84 kg)	So	Nebraska–Kearney	Denver, Colorado
F	7	Porter Bazil	6 ft 7 in (2.01 m)	215 lb (98 kg)	So	Lincoln Northeast High School	Lincoln, Nebraska
F	8	Trent Johnson	6 ft 6 in (1.98 m)	197 lb (89 kg)	Sr	Idaho State	Cambridge, Ontario
G	9	Bryson Dawkins	6 ft 2 in (1.88 m)	198 lb (90 kg)	Jr	Itawamba Community College	Dothan, Alabama
G	11	Mason McBride	6 ft 3 in (1.91 m)	185 lb (84 kg)	Jr	Western Texas College	Manvel, Texas
F	12	Valentin Catt	6 ft 9 in (2.06 m)	244 lb (111 kg)	GS	Lamar	Orangefield, Texas
F	13	Ahjany Lee	6 ft 8 in (2.03 m)	217 lb (98 kg)	Jr	St. Thomas (MN)	Byron, Minnesota
G	14	Nathan Self	6 ft 2 in (1.88 m)	195 lb (88 kg)	Jr	McMurry	Houston, Texas
F	15	Peyton Rogers	6 ft 6 in (1.98 m)	214 lb (97 kg)	GS	Emporia State	Chippewa Falls, Wisconsin
G	22	Marques Gates	5 ft 11 in (1.8 m)	194 lb (88 kg)	Jr	Clemens High School	Selma, Texas
G	23	Pierce Bazil	6 ft 2 in (1.88 m)	184 lb (83 kg)	Jr	Powerhouse Hoops Prep	Lincoln, Nebraska

Head coach

- Craig Doty (Morningside)

Assistant coach(es)

- Evan Lavery (Central Methodist)
- Cam Clark (Southwestern)
- Terry Johnson (Stanislaus State)
- Adam Cytlak (Ohio Dominican)
- Nick Hilton (Bellevue)

Legend

- (C) Team captain
- (S) Suspended
- (I) Ineligible
- (W) Walk-on
- Injured
- Current redshirt

Roster
Last update: December 3, 2024

== Schedule and results ==
Date time, TV	Rank^{#}	Opponent^{#}	Result	Record	High points	High rebounds	High assists	Site (attendance) city, state
Regular season
Nov 4, 2024*; 7:00 pm, ESPN+		Avila (MO)	W 86–59	1–0	18 – B. Dawkins	8 – P. Rogers	5 – E. Brooks	Sharp Gymnasium (377); Houston, TX
Nov 8, 2024*; 7:00 pm, ESPN+		at No. 19 Texas	L 59–90	1–1	20 – J. Mackey	4 – J. Mackey	2 – D. Samuels	Moody Center (10,993); Austin TX
Nov 13, 2024*; 7:00 pm, FS1		at No. 14 Creighton	L 43–78	1–2	8 – D. Samuels	7 – T. Johnson	3 – T. Johnson	CHI Health Center Omaha (16,348); Omaha, NE
Nov 16, 2024*; 3:30 pm, ESPN+		Rockford	W 84–64	2–2	21 – E. Brooks	6 – E. Brooks	6 – J. Mackey	Sharp Gymnasium (717); Houston, TX
Nov 22, 2024*; 7:00 pm, ESPN+		Rice	L 58–61	2–3	10 – B. Dawkins	6 – B. Dawkins	3 – E. Brooks	Sharp Gymnasium (847); Houston, TX
November 25, 2024*; 7:00 pm, ESPN+		Eastern Michigan; HCU MTE	L 73–74	2–4	17 – E. Brooks	5 – Tied	3 – B. Dawkins	Sharp Gymnasium (654); Houston, TX
November 27, 2024*; 7:00 pm, ESPN+		Northern Arizona; HCU MTE	L 71–74	2–5	29 – E. Brooks	8 – J. Mackey	4 – I. Reynolds	Sharp Gymnasium (498); Houston, TX
November 30, 2024*; 3:00 pm, ESPN+		at UTSA	L 71–78	2–6	20 – J. Mackey	9 – P. Rogers	5 – T. Johnson	Convocation Center (828); San Antonio, TX
December 5, 2024; 7:00 pm, ESPN+		East Texas A&M	W 83–79	3–6 (1–0)	22 – B. Dawkins	7 – Tied	3 – Tied	Sharp Gymnasium (679); Houston, TX
December 7, 2024; 3:30 pm, ESPN+		Northwestern State	L 57–64	3–7 (1–1)	13 – B. Dawkins	6 – P. Rogers	2 – Tied	Sharp Gymnasium (493); Houston, TX
December 17, 2024*; 7:30 pm, ESPN+		at Louisiana–Monroe	W 74–68	4–7	32 – J. Mackey	9 – P. Rogers	4 – P. Rogers	Fant–Ewing Coliseum (1,212); Monroe, LA
December 20, 2024*; 1:00 pm, SECN+/ESPN+		at No. 12 Texas A&M	L 45–77	4–8	12 – D. Samuels	8 – P. Rogers	2 – Tied	Reed Arena (5,023); College Station, TX
December 22, 2024*; 2:00 pm, ESPN+		at North Texas	L 46–62	4–9	14 – J. Mackey	6 – T. Johnson	3 – E. Brooks	UNT Coliseum (2,727); Denton, TX
January 4, 2025; 6:00 pm, ESPN+		at Lamar	L 61–63	4–10 (1–2)	20 – Tied	8 – Tied	3 – D. Samuels	Neches Arena (1,533); Beaumont, TX
January 6, 2025; 6:30 pm, ESPN+		at Stephen F. Austin	W 83–73	5–10 (2–2)	22 – J. Mackey	11 – P. Rogers	6 – E. Brooks	William R. Johnson Coliseum (1,270); Nacogdoches, TX
January 11, 2025; 3:30 pm, ESPN+		Incarnate Word	W 81–76	6–10 (3–2)	17 – B. Dawkins	7 – E. Brooks	4 – E. Brooks	Sharp Gymnasium (445); Houston, TX
January 13, 2025; 7:00 pm, ESPN+		McNeese	L 59–75	6–11 (3–3)	15 – D. Samuels	7 – B. Dawkins	5 – D. Samuels	Sharp Gymnasium (857); Houston, TX
January 18, 2025; 3:30 pm, ESPN+		UT Rio Grande Valley	W 66–57	7–11 (4–3)	15 – B. Dawkins	9 – P. Rogers	2 – D. Williams	Sharp Gymnasium (601); Houston, TX
January 20, 2025; 7:00 pm, ESPN+		Texas A&M–Corpus Christi	W 76–72	8–11 (5–3)	19 – J. Mackey	6 – P. Rogers	3 – B. Dawkins	Sharp Gymnasium (432); Houston, TX
January 25, 2025; 5:00 pm, ESPN+		at New Orleans	W 86–76	9–11 (6–3)	28 – B. Dawkins	7 – T. Johnson	5 – E. Brooks	Lakefront Arena (964); New Orleans, LA
January 27, 2025; 6:00 pm, ESPN+		at Southeastern Louisiana	W 70–62	10–11 (7–3)	27 – Tied	9 – P. Rogers	3 – T. Johnson	Pride Roofing University Center (507); Hammond, LA
February 1, 2025; 5:00 pm, ESPN+		at Incarnate Word	L 64–74	10–12 (7–4)	16 – P. Rogers	8 – P. Rogers	5 – E. Brooks	McDermott Center (194); San Antonio, TX
February 3, 2025; 6:30 pm, ESPN+		at Nicholls	L 67–75	10–13 (7–5)	21 – B. Dawkins	6 – B. Dawkins	3 – B. Dawkins	Stopher Gymnasium (781); Thibodaux, LA
February 8, 2025; 3:30 pm, ESPN+		New Orleans	W 81–68	11–13 (8–5)	27 – J. Mackey	5 – B. Dawkins	6 – B. Dawkins	Sharp Gymnasium (779); Houston, TX
February 10, 2025; 7:00 pm, ESPN+		Southeastern Louisiana	L 60–69	11–14 (8–6)	25 – J. Mackey	7 – D. Samuels	4 – D. Samuels	Sharp Gymnasium (988); Houston, TX
February 15, 2025; 4:30 pm, ESPN+		at UT Rio Grande Valley	L 52–76	11–15 (8–7)	15 – B. Dawkins	8 – P. Rogers	4 – D. Samuels	UTRGV Fieldhouse (1,732); Edinburg, TX
February 17, 2025; 7:00 pm, ESPN+		at Texas A&M–Corpus Christi	L 62–68	11–16 (8–8)	16 – E. Brooks	9 – P. Rogers	3 – E. Brooks	American Bank Center (1,433); Corpus Christi, TX
February 22, 2025; 3:30 pm, ESPN+		Lamar	L 58–66	11–17 (8–9)	18 – J. Mackey	6 – P. Rogers	2 – E. Brooks	Sharp Gymnasium (765); Houston, TX
February 24, 2025; 7:00 pm, ESPN+		Stephen F. Austin	W 72–56	12–17 (9–9)	41 – B. Dawkins	10 – B. Dawkins	5 – E. Brooks	Sharp Gymnasium (894); Houston, TX
March 1, 2025; 6:30 pm, ESPN+		at Northwestern State	L 56–61	12–18 (9–10)	8 – B. Dawkins	8 – T. Johnson	4 – E. Brooks	Prather Coliseum (429); Natchitoches, LA
March 3, 2025; 6:30 pm, ESPN+		at East Texas A&M	L 59–63	12–19 (9–11)	18 – D. Samuels	8 – T. Johnson	4 – E. Brooks	The Field House (321); Commerce, TX
Southland tournament
March 9, 2025; 5:00 pm, ESPN+	(8)	vs. (5) Texas A&M–Corpus Christi; First round	L 48–62	12–20	17 – J. Mackey	4 – D. Samuels	4 – E. Brooks	The Legacy Center (902); Lake Charles, LA
*Non-conference game. ^{#}Rankings from AP Poll. (#) Tournament seedings in parentheses. All times are in Central.

== Conference awards and honors ==
=== Weekly awards ===
Weekly honors
Honors	Player	Position	Date awarded	Ref.
SLC Men's Basketball Player of the Week	Bryson Dawkins	G	March 3, 2025	

== See also ==
2024–25 Houston Christian Huskies women's basketball team
