= 2024–25 Incarnate Word Cardinals men's basketball team =

2024–25 Incarnate Word Cardinals men's basketball

CBI, Semifinals
- Conference: Southland Conference
- Record: 19–17 (9–11 Southland)
- Head coach: Shane Heirman (2nd season)
- Assistant coaches: Ben Lang (2nd season); David Marek (1st season); Barron Thelmon (1st season)
- Home arena: McDermott Center (Capacity: 2,000)

2024–25 Southland Conference men's basketball standings
	Conf.				Overall
Team	W		L	PCT	W		L	PCT
McNeese †	19	–	1	.950	28	–	7	.800
Lamar	14	–	6	.700	20	–	13	.606
Nicholls	13	–	7	.650	20	–	13	.606
Northwestern State	12	–	8	.600	16	–	16	.500
Texas A&M–Corpus Christi	12	–	8	.600	20	–	14	.588
Southeastern Louisiana	12	–	8	.600	18	–	14	.563
Incarnate Word	9	–	11	.450	19	–	17	.528
Houston Christian	9	–	11	.450	12	–	20	.375
UT Rio Grande Valley	8	–	12	.400	16	–	15	.516
Stephen F. Austin	7	–	13	.350	14	–	17	.452
East Texas A&M*	3	–	17	.150	5	–	26	.161
New Orleans	2	–	18	.100	4	–	27	.129
† 2025 Southland tournament winner * ineligible for the 2025 NCAA tournament due to transition period

The 2024–25 Incarnate Word Cardinals men's basketball team represented the University of the Incarnate Word during the 2024–25 NCAA Division I men's basketball season. The Cardinals were led by second-year head coach Shane Heirman and played their home games at the McDermott Center in San Antonio, Texas as members of the Southland Conference.

== Previous season ==
The Cardinals finished the 2023–24 season 8–23, 3–15 in Southland play to finish in last place. They failed to qualify for the Southland tournament, as only the top eight teams qualify.

== Preseason polls ==
=== Southland Conference poll ===
The Southland Conference released its preseason poll on October 16, 2024. Receiving 117 votes overall, the Cardinals were picked to finish seventh in the conference.

Predicted finish	Team	Votes (1st place)
1	McNeese	242 (21)
2	Stephen F. Austin	208
3	Nicholls	205 (3)
4	Texas A&M–Corpus Christi	191
5	Lamar	143
6	Southeastern	121
7	Incarnate Word	117
8	UT Rio Grande Valley	112
9	Northwestern State	90
10	Texas A&M–Commerce	54
10	New Orleans	54
12	Houston Christian	48

=== Preseason All Conference ===
Jalin Anderson was selected as a second–team member of a preseason all–conference team.

== Roster ==
2024–25 Incarnate Word Cardinals men's basketball team
Players
Coaches

Pos.	#	Name	Height	Weight	Year	Previous school	Hometown
G	0	Ryan Van Eyck	6 ft 6 in (1.98 m)	190 lb (86 kg)	Fr	Orange Lions Academy	Boskoop, Netherlands
PG	1	Jalin Anderson	6 ft 3 in (1.91 m)	190 lb (86 kg)	GS	Ball State	Jackson, Tennessee
F	2	Dylan Hayman	6 ft 5 in (1.96 m)	205 lb (93 kg)	Sr	Healdsburg High School	Healdsburg, California
F/C	3	Shon Robinson (5Y)	6 ft 9 in (2.06 m)	225 lb (102 kg)	Sr	Austin Peay	Chicago, Illinois
F/C	4	Jayden Williams	6 ft 9 in (2.06 m)	230 lb (104 kg)	Fr	Bella Vista Prep	Chicago, Illinois
G	5	Davion Bailey	6 ft 4 in (1.93 m)	195 lb (88 kg)	GS	Southeastern Community College	Indianapolis, Indiana
G	6	Harrison Reede	6 ft 1 in (1.85 m)	173 lb (78 kg)	RS Fr	Southern Utah	Aberdeen, South Dakota
G/F	7	Jordan Pyke	6 ft 7 in (2.01 m)	200 lb (91 kg)	So	Union (TN)	Greensboro, North Carolina
F	8	Marcus Glover	6 ft 8 in (2.03 m)	230 lb (104 kg)	So	Hillcrest Academy	Chicago, Illinois
F	9	Lamin Sabally	6 ft 8 in (2.03 m)	215 lb (98 kg)	Sr	UTSA	Berlin, Germany
PG	11	TJ Ford Jr.	5 ft 10 in (1.78 m)	155 lb (70 kg)	So	Ridge Point High School	Houston, Texas
G/F	12	Mintautas Mockus	6 ft 7 in (2.01 m)	200 lb (91 kg)	So	UCF	Klaipėda, Lithuania
G	14	Kobi Bowles	6 ft 1 in (1.85 m)	180 lb (82 kg)	Fr	Lawrence North High School	Indianapolis, Indiana
G	15	Isaiah Kortas	6 ft 4 in (1.93 m)	170 lb (77 kg)	Fr	Higley High School	Gilbert, Arizona
C	35	Josh Akpovwa	6 ft 9 in (2.06 m)	270 lb (122 kg)	So	Seven Lakes High School	Houston, Texas
G	99	Amani Drummond	6 ft 1 in (1.85 m)	170 lb (77 kg)	Jr	Central Michigan	Houston, Texas

Head coach

- Shane Heirman (Tulsa)

Assistant coach(es)

- Ben Lang (DePaul)
- David Marek (Southern Utah)
- Barron Thelmon (UNC Wilmington)

Legend

- (C) Team captain
- (S) Suspended
- (I) Ineligible
- (W) Walk-on
- (5Y) Fifth-year senior
- Injured
- Current redshirt

Roster
Last update: November 29, 2024

== Schedule and results ==
Date time, TV	Opponent	Result	Record	High points	High rebounds	High assists	Site (attendance) city, state
Regular season
November 4, 2024*; 9:00 pm, ESPN+	at California Baptist	L 78–83	0–1	41 – D. Bailey	9 – J. Williams	3 – J. Anderson	Fowler Events Center (3,294); Riverside, CA
November 8, 2024*; 12:00 pm, ESPN+	Southwestern	W 97–53	1–1	22 – J. Pyke	6 – D. Hayman	6 – J. Anderson	McDermott Center (550); San Antonio, TX
November 12, 2024*; 7:00 pm, ESPN+	Prairie View A&M	W 84–81	2–1	20 – J. Pyke	12 – J. Pyke	2 – J. Pyke	McDermott Center (236); San Antonio, TX
November 16, 2024*; 3:00 pm, ESPN+	Arkansas–Pine Bluff	W 92–64	3–1	18 – D. Hayman	9 – J. Williams	10 – J. Anderson	McDermott Center (112); San Antonio, TX
November 22, 2024*; 2:00 pm, ESPN+	at Northern Arizona	L 74–75	3–2	15 – D. Hayman	5 – J. Pyke	10 – J. Anderson	Rolle Activity Center (583); Flagstaff, AZ
November 25, 2024*; 7:00 pm, ESPN+	at South Alabama; Jaguar Classic	L 63–84	3–3	25 – J. Anderson	11 – J. Pyke	7 – J. Anderson	Mitchell Center (1,771); Mobile, AL
November 27, 2024*; 5:00 pm	vs. Western Illinois; Jaguar Classic	W 86–75	4–3	23 – D. Bailey	5 – L. Sabally	8 – J. Anderson	Mitchell Center (53); Mobile, AL
December 5, 2024; 7:00 pm, ESPN+	Northwestern State	L 70–72	4–4 (0–1)	22 – D. Bailey	7 – D. Bailey	8 – J. Anderson	McDermott Center (452); San Antonio, TX
December 7, 2024; 5:00 pm, ESPN+	East Texas A&M	W 65–53	5–4 (1–1)	19 – D. Bailey	6 – Tied	2 – J. Anderson	McDermott Center; San Antonio, TX
December 10, 2024*; 7:00 pm, ACCN	at No. 4 Duke	L 46–72	5–5	11 – Tied	7 – J. Williams	3 – T. Ford Jr.	Cameron Indoor Stadium (9,314); Durham, NC
December 15, 2024*; 3:00 pm, ESPN+	Our Lady of the Lake	W 93–69	6–5	23 – D. Hayman	6 – Tied	13 – J. Anderson	McDermott Center (169); San Antonio, TX
December 19, 2024*; 5:00 pm, ESPN+	Schreiner	W 101–57	7–5	33 – D. Bailey	10 – J. Williams	7 – T. Ford Jr.	McDermott Center (118); San Antonio, TX
December 29, 2024*; 5:00 pm, ESPN+	Texas Lutheran	W 99–48	8–5	18 – Tied	9 – J. Williams	7 – T. Ford Jr.	McDermott Center (237); San Antonio, TX
January 4, 2025; 5:00 pm, ESPN+	at Stephen F. Austin	W 55–49	9–5 (2–1)	19 – D. Bailey	11 – L. Sabally	3 – J. Anderson	William R. Johnson Coliseum (1,803); Nacogdoches, TX
January 6, 2025; 7:00 pm, ESPN+	at Lamar	L 58–72	9–6 (2–2)	16 – Tied	6 – Tied	5 – J. Anderson	Neches Arena (1,333); Beaumont, TX
January 11, 2025; 3:30 pm, ESPN+	at Houston Christian	L 76–81	9–7 (2–3)	27 – J. Pyke	7 – J. Pyke	4 – J. Anderson	Sharp Gymnasium (445); Houston, TX
January 13, 2025; 6:30 pm, ESPN+	Nicholls	L 82–88	9–8 (2–4)	22 – D. Bailey	6 – J. Pyke	4 – J. Anderson	McDermott Center (266); San Antonio, TX
January 18, 2025; 5:00 pm, ESPN+	Texas A&M–Corpus Christi	L 63–69	9–9 (2–5)	16 – J. Pyke	9 – J. Pyke	3 – D. Hayman	McDermott Center (305); San Antonio, TX
January 20, 2025; 6:30 pm, ESPN+	UT Rio Grande Valley	L 78–85	9–10 (2–6)	28 – D. Bailey	8 – D. Hayman	6 – J. Anderson	McDermott Center (164); San Antonio, TX
January 25, 2025; 3:30 pm, ESPN+	at Southeastern Louisiana	L 63–86	9–11 (2–7)	27 – J. Anderson	5 – D. Hayman	3 – J. Anderson	Pride Roofing University Center (589); Hammond, LA
January 27, 2025; 6:30 pm, ESPN+	at New Orleans	W 74–58	10–11 (3–7)	15 – J. Pyke	8 – J. Pyke	7 – D. Hayman	Lakefront Arena (604); New Orleans, LA
February 1, 2025; 5:00 pm, ESPN+	Houston Christian	W 74–64	11–11 (4–7)	29 – J. Anderson	6 – J. Pyke	5 – J. Anderson	McDermott Center (194); San Antonio, TX
February 3, 2025; 6:00 pm, ESPN+	at McNeese	L 65–67	11–12 (4–8)	15 – J. Anderson	5 – M. Glover	4 – J. Anderson	The Legacy Center (3,216); Lake Charles, LA
February 8, 2025; 5:00 pm, ESPN+	Southeastern Louisiana	L 66–71	11–13 (4–9)	29 – J. Anderson	10 – M. Glover	2 – J. Anderson	McDermott Center (205); San Antonio, TX
February 10, 2025; 6:30 pm, ESPN+	New Orleans	W 75–65	12–13 (5–9)	25 – D. Bailey	5 – D. Hayman	3 – D. Hayman	McDermott Center (79); San Antonio, TX
February 15, 2025; 3:30 pm, ESPN+	at Texas A&M–Corpus Christi	L 55–69	12–14 (5–10)	25 – D. Hayman	8 – J. Williams	3 – T. Ford, Jr.	American Bank Center (1,427); Corpus Christi, TX
February 17, 2025; 6:30 pm, ESPN+	at UT Rio Grande Valley	W 66–60	13–14 (6–10)	19 – D. Hayman	9 – D. Hayman	5 – J. Anderson	UTRGV Fieldhouse; Edinburg, TX
February 22, 2025; 5:00 pm, ESPN+	Stephen F. Austin	W 63–61	14–14 (7–10)	22 – J. Anderson	9 – D. Hayman	5 – J. Anderson	McDermott Center (271); San Antonio, TX
February 24, 2025; 6:30 pm, ESPN+	Lamar	W 73–61	15–14 (8–10)	25 – D. Bailey	7 – M. Glover	9 – J. Anderson	McDermott Center (347); San Antonio, TX
March 1, 2025; 2:10 pm, ESPN+	at East Texas A&M	W 75–68	16–14 (9–10)	30 – D. Bailey	7 – D. Hayman	8 – T. Ford Jr.	The Field House (492); Commerce, TX
March 3, 2025; 6:30 pm, ESPN+	at Northwestern State	L 57–73	16–15 (9–11)	15 – L. Sabally	7 – J. Williams	1 – Tied	Prather Coliseum (729); Natchitoches, LA
Southland Tournament
March 9, 2025; 7:30 pm, ESPN+	at (6) Southeastern Louisiana; First round	W 71–67 ^{OT}	17–15	20 – Tied	11 – M. Glover	7 – J. Anderson	The Legacy Center (902); Lake Charles, LA
March 10, 2025; 7:30 pm, ESPN+	at (3) Nicholls; Quarterfinals	L 70–74 ^{OT}	17–16	29 – D. Hayman	8 – L. Sabally	5 – D. Bailey	The Legacy Center (1,310); Lake Charles, LA
CBI
March 23, 2025; 11:00 am, FloHoops	vs. Manhattan; First round	W 92–85	18–16	25 – D. Hayman	11 – J. Pyke	6 – J. Anderson	Ocean Center; Daytona Beach, FL
March 24, 2025; 11:00 am, FloHoops	vs. Jacksonville; Quarterfinals	W 87–71	19–16	23 – D. Bailey	6 – J. Pyke	5 – J. Anderson	Ocean Center (832); Daytona Beach, FL
March 25, 2025; 6:00 pm, ESPNU	vs. Illinois State; Semifinals	L 73–78	19–17	24 – D. Hayman	9 – Tied	3 – J. Anderson	Ocean Center (832); Daytona Beach, FL
*Non-conference game. ^{#}Rankings from AP Poll. (#) Tournament seedings in parentheses. All times are in Central Time.

== Conference awards and honors ==
=== Weekly awards ===
Weekly honors
Honors	Player	Position	Date awarded	Ref.
SLC Men's Basketball Player of the Week	Davion Bailey	G	November 11, 2024	

== See also ==
- 2024–25 Incarnate Word Cardinals women's basketball team
