= 2024–25 McNeese Cowboys basketball team =

American college basketball season

2024–25 McNeese Cowboys basketball

SLC regular season & tournament champions

NCAA tournament, Second Round
- Conference: Southland Conference
- Record: 28–7 (19–1 Southland)
- Head coach: Will Wade (2nd season)
- Assistant coaches: Brandon Chambers; Vernon Hamilton; Shawn Forrest
- Home arena: The Legacy Center

2024–25 Southland Conference men's basketball standings
	Conf.				Overall
Team	W		L	PCT	W		L	PCT
McNeese †	19	–	1	.950	28	–	7	.800
Lamar	14	–	6	.700	20	–	13	.606
Nicholls	13	–	7	.650	20	–	13	.606
Northwestern State	12	–	8	.600	16	–	16	.500
Texas A&M–Corpus Christi	12	–	8	.600	20	–	14	.588
Southeastern Louisiana	12	–	8	.600	18	–	14	.563
Incarnate Word	9	–	11	.450	19	–	17	.528
Houston Christian	9	–	11	.450	12	–	20	.375
UT Rio Grande Valley	8	–	12	.400	16	–	15	.516
Stephen F. Austin	7	–	13	.350	14	–	17	.452
East Texas A&M*	3	–	17	.150	5	–	26	.161
New Orleans	2	–	18	.100	4	–	27	.129
† 2025 Southland tournament winner * ineligible for the 2025 NCAA tournament due to transition period

The 2024–25 McNeese Cowboys basketball team represented McNeese State University in the 2024–25 NCAA Division I men's basketball season. The Cowboys, led by second-year head coach Will Wade, played their home games on-campus at The Legacy Center in Lake Charles, Louisiana as members of the Southland Conference.

== Previous season ==
The Cowboys finished the 2023–24 season 30–4, 17–1 in Southland play, to finish as Southland regular-season champions. They defeated Nicholls and Nicholls to win the Southland tournament title, earning their first trip to the NCAA tournament since 2002. In the NCAA tournament, they received the #12 seed in the Midwest Region, where they fell to Gonzaga in the first round.

== Preseason polls ==
=== Southland Conference Poll ===
The Southland Conference released its preseason poll on October 16, 2024. Receiving 143 votes overall and 21 first-place votes, the Cowboys were picked to finish first in the conference.

Predicted finish	Team	Votes (1st place)
1	McNeese	242 (21)
2	Stephen F. Austin	208
3	Nicholls	205 (3)
4	Texas A&M–Corpus Christi	191
5	Lamar	143
6	Southeastern	121
7	Incarnate Word	117
8	UT Rio Grande Valley	112
9	Northwestern State	90
10	Texas A&M–Commerce	54
10	New Orleans	54
12	Houston Christian	48

=== Preseason All Conference ===
Christian Shumate, Quadir Copeland and Joe Charles were selected as first-team members of a preseason all-conference team. Javohn Garcia and Brandon Murray were selected as second-team members.

== Roster ==
2024–25 McNeese Cowboys men's basketball team
Players
Coaches

Pos.	#	Name	Height	Weight	Year	Previous school	Hometown
PG	0	T'Johnn Brown	5 ft 11 in (1.8 m)	164 lb (74 kg)	So	Kimball High School	Dallas, TX
PG	1	Omar Cooper	6 ft 0 in (1.83 m)	179 lb (81 kg)	Sr	Clarendon College	Atlanta, GA
SG	2	DJ Jr. Richards	6 ft 4 in (1.93 m)	185 lb (84 kg)	Jr	UTSA	Houston, TX
PG	3	Mike Jr. Saunders	6 ft 0 in (1.83 m)	189 lb (86 kg)	Sr	Utah	Indianapolis, IN
F	5	Joe Charles	6 ft 9 in (2.06 m)	215 lb (98 kg)	Sr	Louisiana	Carencro, LA
SG	6	Javohn Garcia	6 ft 3 in (1.91 m)	183 lb (83 kg)	Sr	College of the Sequoias	Columbus, OH
G	7	Alyn Breed (injured)	6 ft 3 in (1.91 m)	190 lb (86 kg)	RS Sr	Providence	Powder Springs, GA
F	8	Jerome Jr. Brewer	6 ft 9 in (2.06 m)	216 lb (98 kg)	Jr	Texas A&M–Commerce	Camden, NJ
F	9	Bryant Selebangue	6 ft 8 in (2.03 m)	225 lb (102 kg)	Jr	Arizona State	Montreal, QC
G	11	Quadir Copeland	6 ft 6 in (1.98 m)	200 lb (91 kg)	Jr	Syracuse	Philadelphia, PA
G	13	Howard Jr. Gaskins	6 ft 2 in (1.88 m)	185 lb (84 kg)	Fr	Liberty Magnet High School	Baton Rouge, LA
G	14	Erik Villarreal	6 ft 3 in (1.91 m)	190 lb (86 kg)	Fr	Clear Lake High School	Houston, TX
G	21	Sincere Parker	6 ft 3 in (1.91 m)	195 lb (88 kg)	Jr	Saint Louis	Rockford, IL
G	23	Brandon Murray	6 ft 5 in (1.96 m)	210 lb (95 kg)	Sr	Ole Miss	Germantown, MD
F	24	Christian Shumate	6 ft 6 in (1.98 m)	213 lb (97 kg)	Sr	Tulsa	Chicago, IL
G	33	Lamont Evans	6 ft 0 in (1.83 m)	155 lb (70 kg)	Jr	Saint Louis	Hollywood, FL

Head coach

- Will Wade (Clemson)

Assistant coach(es)

- Brandon Chambers (VCU)
- Vernon Hamilton (Clemson)
- Shawn Forrest (Arkansas–Pine Bluff)

Legend

- (C) Team captain
- (S) Suspended
- (I) Ineligible
- (W) Walk-on
- Injured
- Current redshirt

Roster
Last update: December 3, 2024

== Schedule and results ==
Date time, TV	Rank^{#}	Opponent^{#}	Result	Record	High points	High rebounds	High assists	Site (attendance) city, state
Non-conference regular season
November 4, 2024*; 5:00 p.m., YouTube		vs. South Dakota State; Field of 68 Showcase	L 73–80	0–1	18 – A. Breed	9 – C. Shumate	2 – J. Garcia	Sanford Pentagon (2,878); Sioux Falls, SD
November 7, 2024*; 7:30 p.m.		Biblical Studies	W 111–57	1–1	21 – J. Garcia	8 – O. Cooper	13 – O. Cooper	The Legacy Center (3,036); Lake Charles, LA
November 11, 2024*; 6:00 p.m., SECN		at No. 2 Alabama	L 64–72	1–2	19 – S. Parker	9 – J. Charles	2 – A. Breed	Coleman Coliseum (13,474); Tuscaloosa, AL
November 18, 2024*; 6:00 p.m., ESPN+		at North Texas	W 68–61	2–2	18 – S. Parker	9 – J. Charles	8 – O. Cooper	UNT Coliseum (3,537); Denton, TX
November 22, 2023*; 2:00 p.m., ESPN+		vs. Illinois State; Paradise Jam quarterfinal	W 76–68	3–2	16 – J. Garcia	7 – 2 tied	5 – O. Cooper	Sports and Fitness Center (1,535); St. Thomas, USVI
November 24, 2024*; 4:30 p.m., ESPN+		vs. Longwood; Paradise Jam semifinal	W 84–69	4–2	31 – S. Parker	6 – J. Charles	3 – B. Murray	Sports and Fitness Center (2,225); St. Thomas, USVI
November 25, 2024*; 7:00 p.m., ESPN+		vs. Liberty; Paradise Jam final	L 58–62	4–3	13 – C. Shumate	7 – Q. Copeland	2 – 2 tied	Sports and Fitness Center (1,986); St. Thomas, USVI
December 3, 2024*; 6:00 p.m., ESPN+		Santa Clara	L 67–74	4–4	17 – 2 tied	7 – C. Shumate	5 – O. Cooper	The Legacy Center (3,102); Lake Charles, LA
December 7, 2024*; 3:00 p.m., ESPN+		LeTourneau	W 103–69	5–4	22 – C. Shumate	9 – Q. Copeland	11 – Q. Copeland	The Legacy Center (2,765); Lake Charles, LA
December 14, 2024*; 5:00 p.m., ESPNU		vs. No. 25 Mississippi State; Magnolia Madness	L 63–66	5–5	19 – J. Charles	9 – B. Murray	4 – 2 tied	Cadence Bank Arena (3,846); Tupelo, MS
December 22, 2024*; 2:00 p.m., ESPN+		at Louisiana	W 64–56	6–5	22 – S. Parker	9 – J. Charles	2 – B. Murray	Cajundome (2,407); Lafayette, LA
Conference regular season
December 28, 2024; 4:00 p.m., ESPN+		New Orleans	W 86–61	7–5 (1–0)	21 – D. Richards Jr.	6 – C. Shumate	10 – Q. Copeland	The Legacy Center (3,130); Lake Charles, LA
December 30, 2024; 6:00 p.m., ESPN+		Southeastern Louisiana	W 79–51	8–5 (2–0)	26 – J. Garcia	12 – B. Selebangue	8 – Q. Copeland	The Legacy Center (3,106); Lake Charles, LA
January 4, 2025; 2:15 p.m., ESPN+		at East Texas A&M	W 75–56	9–5 (3–0)	24 – J. Garcia	10 – 2 tied	6 – Q. Copeland	The Field House (812); Commerce, TX
January 6, 2025; 6:30 p.m., ESPN+		at Northwestern State	W 92–69	10–5 (4–0)	20 – D. Richards Jr.	6 – C. Shumate	11 – Q. Copeland	Prather Coliseum (387); Natchitoches, LA
January 11, 2025; 4:00 p.m., ESPN+		Nicholls	W 80–71	11–5 (5–0)	25 – J. Garcia	12 – J. Charles	3 – B. Selebangua	The Legacy Center (4,032); Lake Charles, LA
January 13, 2025; 7:00 p.m., ESPN+		at Houston Christian	W 75–59	12–5 (6–0)	16 – 2 tied	9 – B. Selebangue	7 – Q. Copeland	Sharp Gymnasium (857); Houston, TX
January 18, 2025; 4:00 p.m., ESPN+		Lamar; Battle of the Border	W 75–64	13–5 (7–0)	19 – D. Richards Jr.	6 – Q. Copeland	3 – D. Richards Jr.	The Legacy Center (4,082); Lake Charles, LA
January 20, 2025; 6:00 p.m., ESPN+		Stephen F. Austin	W 79–59	14–5 (8–0)	16 – C. Shumate	11 – C. Shumate	6 – Q. Copeland	The Legacy Center (2,929); Lake Charles, LA
January 25, 2025; 4:30 p.m., ESPN+		at UT Rio Grande Valley	W 93–63	15–5 (9–0)	21 – Q. Copeland	10 – C. Shumate	8 – Q. Copeland	UTRGV Fieldhouse (1,473); Edinburg, TX
January 27, 2025; 7:00 p.m., ESPN+		at Texas A&M–Corpus Christi	W 74–73	16–5 (10–0)	14 – J. Garcia	5 – 2 tied	4 – Q. Copeland	American Bank Center (2,032); Corpus Christi, TX
February 1, 2025; 3:00 p.m., ESPN+		at Nicholls	L 63–71	16–6 (10–1)	16 – B. Murray	9 – J. Charles	3 – Q. Copeland	Stopher Gymnasium (877); Thibodaux, LA
February 3, 2025; 6:00 p.m., ESPN+		Incarnate Word	W 67–65	17–6 (11–1)	13 – J. Garcia	9 – C. Shumate	7 – Q. Copeland	The Legacy Center (3,216); Lake Charles, LA
February 8, 2025; 4:00 p.m., ESPN+		Northwestern State	W 65–50	18–6 (12–1)	22 – J. Garcia	7 – B. Selebangue	4 – Q. Copeland	The Legacy Center (3,670); Lake Charles, LA
February 10, 2025; 6:00 p.m., ESPN+		East Texas A&M	W 67–51	19–6 (13–1)	19 – C. Shumate	14 – C. Shumate	6 – Q. Copeland	The Legacy Center (2,883); Lake Charles, LA
February 15, 2025; 5:00 p.m., ESPN+		at New Orleans	W 78–64	20–6 (14–1)	21 – D. Richards Jr.	10 – J. Charles	4 – Q. Copeland	Lakefront Arena (737); New Orleans, LA
February 17, 2025; 6:00 p.m., ESPN+		at Southeastern Louisiana	W 88–82	21–6 (15–1)	18 – J. Garcia	10 – J. Charles	6 – Q. Copeland	Pride Roofing University Center (1,218); Hammond, LA
February 22, 2025; 4:00 p.m., ESPN+		Texas A&M–Corpus Christi	W 73–57	22–6 (16–1)	16 – J. Charles	7 – C. Shumate	5 – B. Murray	The Legacy Center (4,032); Lake Charles, LA
February 24, 2025; 6:00 p.m., ESPN+		UT Rio Grande Valley	W 100–65	23–6 (17–1)	19 – 2 tied	12 – J. Charles	8 – Q. Copeland	The Legacy Center (3,181); Lake Charles, LA
March 1, 2025; 6:00 p.m., ESPN+		at Lamar; Battle of the Border	W 68–66	24–6 (18–1)	25 – S. Parker	7 – J. Garcia	6 – Q. Copeland	Neches Arena (5,746); Beaumont, TX
March 3, 2025; 6:30 p.m., ESPNU		at Stephen F. Austin	W 95–64	25–6 (19–1)	22 – S. Parker	9 – J. Charles	5 – Q. Copeland	William R. Johnson Coliseum (2,924); Nacogdoches, TX
Southland tournament
March 11, 2025; 6:00 p.m., ESPNU	(1)	(4) Northwestern State; Semifinals	W 83–64	26–6	24 – J. Garcia	9 – J. Charles	5 – 2 tied	The Legacy Center (3,782); Lake Charles, LA
March 12, 2025; 4:00 p.m., ESPN2	(1)	(2) Lamar; Championship	W 63–54	27–6	18 – Q. Copeland	7 – J. Charles	4 – Q. Copeland	The Legacy Center (4,106); Lake Charles, LA
NCAA tournament
March 20, 2025*; 2:15 p.m., TruTV	(12 MW)	vs. (5 MW) No. 12 Clemson; First Round	W 69–67	28–6	21 – B. Murray	11 – C. Shumate	5 – Q. Copeland	Amica Mutual Pavilion (11,441); Providence, RI
March 22, 2025*; 11:10 a.m., CBS	(12 MW)	vs. (4 MW) No. 22 Purdue; Second Round	L 62–76	28–7	17 – S. Parker	9 – C. Shumate	4 – 2 tied	Amica Mutual Pavilion (11,487); Providence, RI
*Non-conference game. ^{#}Rankings from AP poll. (#) Tournament seedings in parentheses. MW=Midwest. All times are in Central.

== Conference awards and honors ==
=== Weekly awards ===
Weekly honors
Honors	Player	Position	Date awarded	Ref.
SLC Men's Basketball Player of the Week	Sincere Parker	G	November 25, 2024	
SLC Men's Basketball Player of the Week	Javohn Garcia	G	January 6, 2025	
SLC Men's Basketball Player of the Week	Joe Charles	F	February 24, 2025	

== See also ==
- 2024–25 McNeese Cowgirls basketball team
