= 2024–25 Southeastern Louisiana Lions basketball team =

American college basketball season

2024–25 Southeastern Louisiana Lions basketball
- Conference: Southland Conference
- Record: 18–14 (12–8 Southland)
- Head coach: David Kiefer (6th season)
- Associate head coach: Kyle Roane
- Assistant coaches: Cody McCoy; Drew Riley
- Home arena: University Center (Capacity: 7,500)

2024–25 Southland Conference men's basketball standings
| | Conf. | | | | Overall |
| Team | W | | L | PCT | W | | L | PCT |
|---|---|---|---|---|---|---|---|---|
| McNeese † | 19 | – | 1 | .950 | 28 | – | 7 | .800 |
| Lamar | 14 | – | 6 | .700 | 20 | – | 13 | .606 |
| Nicholls | 13 | – | 7 | .650 | 20 | – | 13 | .606 |
| Northwestern State | 12 | – | 8 | .600 | 16 | – | 16 | .500 |
| Texas A&M–Corpus Christi | 12 | – | 8 | .600 | 20 | – | 14 | .588 |
| Southeastern Louisiana | 12 | – | 8 | .600 | 18 | – | 14 | .563 |
| Incarnate Word | 9 | – | 11 | .450 | 19 | – | 17 | .528 |
| Houston Christian | 9 | – | 11 | .450 | 12 | – | 20 | .375 |
| UT Rio Grande Valley | 8 | – | 12 | .400 | 16 | – | 15 | .516 |
| Stephen F. Austin | 7 | – | 13 | .350 | 14 | – | 17 | .452 |
| East Texas A&M* | 3 | – | 17 | .150 | 5 | – | 26 | .161 |
| New Orleans | 2 | – | 18 | .100 | 4 | – | 27 | .129 |
† 2025 Southland tournament winner * ineligible for the 2025 NCAA tournament due to transition period

The 2024–25 Southeastern Louisiana Lions basketball team represented Southeastern Louisiana University in the 2024–25 NCAA Division I men's basketball season. The Lions, led by sixth-year head coach David Kiefer, played their home games at the University Center in Hammond, Louisiana as members of the Southland Conference. The Lions finished the 2024–25 season 18–14, 12–8 in a three way tie for fifth place in conference play. The Lions' season ended with a 67–71 overtime loss to Incarnate Word in a first round SLC tournament game.

== Previous season ==
The Lions finished the 2023–24 season 15–17 overall and 10–8 in Southland Conference play to finish fifth in conference. They lost against New Orleans in the first round.

== Preseason polls ==
=== Southland Conference Poll ===
The Southland Conference released its preseason poll on October 17, 2024. The Lions were picked to finish sixth in the conference.

| Predicted finish | Team | Votes (1st place) |
|---|---|---|
| 1 | McNeese | 242 (21) |
| 2 | Stephen F. Austin | 208 |
| 3 | Nicholls | 205 (3) |
| 4 | Texas A&M–Corpus Christi | 191 |
| 5 | Lamar | 143 |
| 6 | Southeastern | 121 |
| 7 | Incarnate Word | 117 |
| 8 | UT Rio Grande Valley | 112 |
| 9 | Northwestern State | 90 |
| T10 | Texas A&M–Commerce | 54 |
| T10 | New Orleans | 54 |
| 12 | Houston Christian | 48 |

=== Preseason All Conference ===
No Southeastern players were selected as a member of the Preseason all conference team.

== Roster ==
2024–25 Southeastern Louisiana Lions men's basketball team
Players
Coaches

| Pos. | # | Name | Height | Weight | Year | Previous school | Hometown |
|---|---|---|---|---|---|---|---|
| G | 0 | Kam Burton | 6 ft 3 in (1.91 m) | 195 lb (88 kg) | So | Legacy the School of Sport Sciences | Houston, TX |
| F | 1 | Jeremy Elyzee | 6 ft 6 in (1.98 m) | 200 lb (91 kg) | Fr | Pembroke Pines Charter HS | Hialeah, FL |
| G | 2 | Caron Smith | 6 ft 1 in (1.85 m) | 170 lb (77 kg) | Fr | Parkville HS | Baltimore, MD |
| G | 3 | Kyle Edison | 6 ft 4 in (1.93 m) | 185 lb (84 kg) | So | St. John Paul II Catholic HS | West Palm Beach, FL |
| G | 4 | CJ Booker | 5 ft 9 in (1.75 m) | 150 lb (68 kg) | RS So | Seguin HS; UT Rio Grande Valley | Arlington, TX |
| G/F | 5 | Jakevion Buckley | 6 ft 1 in (1.85 m) | 175 lb (79 kg) | Sr | Shelbyville HS; Lamar | Shelbyville, TX |
| G | 8 | Carlos Paez | 5 ft 11 in (1.8 m) | 175 lb (79 kg) | GS | Sunrise Christian Academy; Austin Peay | Naguanagua, Carabobo, Venezuela |
| F | 10 | Jaiden Lawrence | 6 ft 4 in (1.93 m) | 195 lb (88 kg) | Jr | Warren Central HS; Panola College | Bowling Green, KY |
| G | 12 | Ahmed Essahaty | 6 ft 3 in (1.91 m) | 180 lb (82 kg) | Jr | Onslow College; LIU | Wellington, New Zealand |
| F | 15 | Brody Rowbury | 6 ft 11 in (2.11 m) | 290 lb (132 kg) | Jr | Meridian HS; Sunrise Christian Academy | Meridian, ID |
| G | 20 | Sam Hines Jr. | 6 ft 6 in (1.98 m) | 220 lb (100 kg) | Sr | Wheeler HS; South Florida | Duluth, GA |
| G | 21 | Ryan Elzy | 6 ft 2 in (1.88 m) | 185 lb (84 kg) | Sr | Ponchatoula HS; East Texas Baptist | Natalbany, LA |
| F | 22 | Asher Boney | 6 ft 6 in (1.98 m) | 225 lb (102 kg) | RS Fr | Ponchatoula HS | Ponchatoula, LA |
| C | 33 | Max Brackmann | 7 ft 2 in (2.18 m) | 270 lb (122 kg) | Sr | Staedtische Loehne | Löhne, Germany |
| F | 42 | Thomas Tut | 6 ft 10 in (2.08 m) | 210 lb (95 kg) | Jr | Solid Rock Christian Academy | Juba, South Sudan |

Head coach

- David Kiefer (Kansas State)

Assistant coach(es)

- Kyle Roane (Southern Miss)
- Cody McCoy (UT Arlington)
- Drew Riley (Arkansas State)

Legend

- (C) Team captain
- (S) Suspended
- (I) Ineligible
- (W) Walk-on
- Injured
- Current redshirt

Roster
Last update: September 14, 2024

== Schedule and results ==
| Date time, TV | Rank^{#} | Opponent^{#} | Result | Record | High points | High rebounds | High assists | Site (attendance) city, state |
Non-conference regular season
| November 4, 2024*; 7:30 p.m., ESPN+ | | William Carey | W 91–53 | 1–0 | 21 – S. Hines Jr. | 8 – K. Burton | 5 – J. Buckley | University Center (1,233); Hammond, LA |
| November 10, 2024*; 2:00 p.m., ESPN+ | | at UAB | L 72–82 | 1–1 | 16 – J. Buckley | 10 – J. Elyzee | 7 – J. Buckley | Bartow Arena (3,291); Birmingham, AL |
| November 12, 2024*; 6:30 p.m., SECN+ | | at Mississippi State | L 59–80 | 1–2 | 17 – K. Burton | 9 – B. Rowbury | 5 – S. Hines Jr. | Humphrey Coliseum (8,744); Starkville, MS |
| November 18, 2024*; 6:30 p.m., ESPN+ | | at Louisiana–Monroe | W 70–67 | 2–2 | 16 – J. Buckley | 11 – S. Hines Jr. | 5 – J. Buckley | Fant–Ewing Coliseum (1,190); Monroe, LA |
| November 22, 2024*; 7:30 p.m., MW Network | | at Wyoming; Cancún Challenge campus site game | L 61–64 | 2–3 | 20 – K. Burton | 8 – S. Hines, Jr. | 4 – J. Buckley | Arena-Auditorium (3,761); Laramie, WY |
| November 26, 2024*; 11:30 a.m., FloHoops | | vs. Gardner–Webb; Cancún Challenge Mayan Division semifinals | L 69–73 | 2–4 | 22 – J. Elyzee | 7 – S. Hines Jr. | 6 – S. Hines Jr. | Hard Rock Hotel Riviera Maya (103); Cancún, Mexico |
| November 27, 2024*; 11:30 a.m., FloHoops | | vs. North Dakota; Cancún Challenge Mayan Division consolation game | W 76–60 | 3–4 | 17 – S. Hines Jr. | 8 – B. Rowbury | 4 – J. Buckley | Hard Rock Hotel Riviera Maya (123); Cancún, Mexico |
| December 2, 2024*; 6:30 p.m., ESPN+ | | at Tulane | W 71–67 | 4–4 | 18 – J. Buckley | 9 – S. Hines, Jr. | 6 – J. Buckley | Devlin Fieldhouse (1,269); New Orleans, LA |
| December 5, 2024; 6:30 p.m., ESPN+ | | at Nicholls | L 64–67 | 4–5 (0–1) | 13 – Tied | 11 – S. Hines, Jr. | 4 – S. Hines, Jr. | Stopher Gymnasium (587); Thibodaux, LA |
| December 11, 2024*; 7:00 p.m., ESPN+ | | at Louisiana | L 61–68 | 4–6 | 22 – S. Hines, Jr. | 6 – B. Rowbury | 5 – J. Buckley | Cajundome (1,165); Lafayette, LA |
| December 16, 2024*; 12:00 p.m., YouTube | | at Grambling State | W 75–65 | 5–6 | 19 – S. Hines Jr. | 8 – J. Buckley | 7 – J. Buckley | Fredrick C. Hobdy Assembly Center (400); Grambling, LA |
| December 20, 2024*; 6:00 p.m., ESPN+ | | Loyola (New Orleans) | W 96–62 | 6–6 | 19 – Tied | 7 – J. Buckley | 4 – J. Buckley | University Center (483); Hammond, LA |
Southland Conference regular season
| December 30, 2024; 6:00 p.m., ESPN+ | | at McNeese | L 51–79 | 6–7 (0–2) | 11 – Tied | 6 – S. Hines Jr. | 3 – Tied | The Legacy Center (3,106); Lake Charles, LA |
| January 4, 2025; 3:30 p.m., ESPN+ | | Texas A&M–Corpus Christi | L 71–80 | 6–8 (0–3) | 21 – J. Elyzee | 10 – J. Elyzee | 3 – S. Hines Jr. | University Center (538); Hammond, LA |
| January 6, 2025; 6:00 p.m., ESPN+ | | UT Rio Grande Valley | W 79–75 | 7–8 (1–3) | 25 – J. Buckley | 8 – B. Rowbury | 4 – J. Buckley | University Center (461); Hammond, LA |
| January 11, 2025; 5:00 p.m., ESPN+ | | at New Orleans | W 91–71 | 8–8 (2–3) | 30 – S. Hines, Jr. | 10 – S. Hines, Jr. | 9 – J. Buckley | Lakefront Arena (729); New Orleans, LA |
| January 13, 2025; 6:30 p.m., ESPN+ | | at Stephen F. Austin | W 66–59 | 9–8 (3–3) | 16 – J. Buckley | 8 – J. Elyzee | 6 – C. Paez | William R. Johnson Coliseum (1,609); Nacogdoches, TX |
| January 18, 2025; 3:30 p.m., ESPN+ | | at Northwestern State | W 65–64 | 10–8 (4–3) | 19 – J. Buckley | 8 – J. Buckley | 2 – C. Paez | Prather Coliseum (418); Natchitoches, LA |
| January 20, 2025; 1:00 p.m., ESPN+ | | at East Texas A&M | W 76–68 | 11–8 (5–3) | 23 – S. Hines, Jr. | 10 – B. Rowbury | 4 – J. Buckley | The Field House (412); Commerce, TX |
| January 25, 2025; 3:30 p.m., ESPN+ | | Incarnate Word | W 86–63 | 12–8 (6–3) | 22 – S. Hines, Jr. | 4 – J. Elyzee | 5 – J. Buckley | University Center (589); Hammond, LA |
| January 27, 2025; 6:00 p.m., ESPN+ | | Houston Christian | L 62–70 | 12–9 (6–4) | 23 – S. Hines Jr. | 7 – B. Rowbury | 4 – Tied | University Center (507); Hammond, LA |
| February 1, 2025; 3:30 p.m., ESPN+ | | New Orleans | W 76–68 | 13–9 (7–4) | 17 – S. Hines, Jr. | 8 – B. Rowbury | 5 – J. Buckley | University Center (633); Hammond, LA |
| February 3, 2025; 6:00 p.m., ESPN+ | | Lamar | W 81–79 | 14–9 (8–4) | 19 – J. Buckley | 15 – B. Rowbury | 4 – B. Rowbury | University Center (546); Hammond, LA |
| February 8, 2025; 5:00 p.m., ESPN+ | | at Incarnate Word | W 71–66 | 15–9 (9–4) | 27 – J. Buckley | 11 – S. Hines, Jr. | 4 – J. Buckley | McDermott Center (205); San Antonio, TX |
| February 10, 2025; 7:00 p.m., ESPN+ | | at Houston Christian | W 69–60 | 16–9 (10–4) | 25 – J. Buckley | 8 – B. Rowbury | 2 – S. Hines, Jr. | Sharp Gymnasium (988); Houston, TX |
| February 15, 2025; 3:30 p.m., ESPN+ | | Nicholls | W 84–81 ^{OT} | 17–9 (11–4) | 25 – J. Hines, Jr. | 13 – J. Elyzee | 5 – J. Buckley | University Center (927); Hammond, LA |
| February 17, 2025; 6:00 p.m., ESPN+ | | McNeese | L 82–88 | 17–10 (11–5) | 25 – J. Buckley | 6 – S. Hines, Jr. | 7 – J. Buckley | University Center (1,218); Hammond, LA |
| February 22, 2025; 3:30 p.m., ESPN+ | | East Texas A&M | W 83–65 | 18–10 (12–5) | 21 – J. Buckley | 8 – J. Buckley | 7 – J. Buckley | University Center (888); Hammond, LA |
| February 24, 2025; 6:00 p.m., ESPN+ | | Northwestern State | L 69–72 | 18–11 (12–6) | 22 – S. Hines, Jr. | 6 – B. Rowbury | 5 – J. Buckley | University Center (564); Hammond, LA |
| March 1, 2025; 4:30 p.m., ESPN+ | | at Texas A&M–Corpus Christi | L 54–68 | 18–12 (12–7) | 12 – S. Hines, Jr. | 7 – J. Elyzee | 3 – A. Essahaty | American Bank Center (2,511); Corpus Christi, TX |
| March 3, 2025; 6:30 p.m., ESPN+ | | at UT Rio Grande Valley | L 76–77 | 18–13 (12–8) | 19 – J. Buckley | 10 – S. Hines, Jr. | 7 – J. Buckley | UTRGV Fieldhouse (1,622); Edinburg, TX |
Southland Tournament
| March 9, 2025; 7:30 pm, ESPN+ | (6) | vs. (7) Incarnate Word; First Round | L 67–71 ^{OT} | 18–14 | 27 – S. Hines, Jr. | 8 – S. Hines, Jr. | 4 – S. Hines, Jr. | The Legacy Center (902); Lake Charles, LA |
*Non-conference game. ^{#}Rankings from AP Poll. (#) Tournament seedings in parentheses. All times are in Central.

== Conference awards and honors ==
=== Weekly awards ===
Weekly honors
| Honors | Player | Position | Date Awarded | Ref. |
|---|---|---|---|---|
| SLC Men's Basketball Player of the Week | Sam Hines Jr. | G | January 13, 2025 | |
| SLC Men's Basketball Player of the Week | Jakevion Buckley | G | February 10, 2025 | |
| SLC Men's Basketball Player of the Week | Jakevion Buckley | G | February 17, 2025 | |

== See also ==
- 2024–25 Southeastern Louisiana Lady Lions basketball team
