= 2024–25 East Texas A&M Lions men's basketball team =

American college basketball season

2024–25 East Texas A&M Lions men's basketball
- Conference: Southland Conference
- Record: 5–26 (3–17 Southland)
- Head coach: Jaret von Rosenberg (8th season)
- Assistant coaches: Coleman Furst; A.J. Holland; Trey Conrod; Jared Kortsen; Matthew Scott
- Home arena: The Field House

2024–25 Southland Conference men's basketball standings
	Conf.				Overall
Team	W		L	PCT	W		L	PCT
McNeese †	19	–	1	.950	28	–	7	.800
Lamar	14	–	6	.700	20	–	13	.606
Nicholls	13	–	7	.650	20	–	13	.606
Northwestern State	12	–	8	.600	16	–	16	.500
Texas A&M–Corpus Christi	12	–	8	.600	20	–	14	.588
Southeastern Louisiana	12	–	8	.600	18	–	14	.563
Incarnate Word	9	–	11	.450	19	–	17	.528
Houston Christian	9	–	11	.450	12	–	20	.375
UT Rio Grande Valley	8	–	12	.400	16	–	15	.516
Stephen F. Austin	7	–	13	.350	14	–	17	.452
East Texas A&M*	3	–	17	.150	5	–	26	.161
New Orleans	2	–	18	.100	4	–	27	.129
† 2025 Southland tournament winner * ineligible for the 2025 NCAA tournament due to transition period

The 2024–25 East Texas A&M Lions men's basketball team represented East Texas A&M University in the 2024–25 NCAA Division I men's basketball season. The Lions, led by seventh-year head coach Jaret von Rosenberg, played their home games at The Field House in Commerce, Texas as members of the Southland Conference. The Lions finished the 2024–25 season 5–26, 3–17 in conference play to finish in eleventh place. Failing to qualify for the SLC tournament, the Lions' season ended with a 63–59 victory over Houston Christian.

This season marked Texas A&M–Commerce's third year of an originally scheduled four–year transition period from Division II to Division I. As a result, the Lions were not be eligible for NCAA postseason play until the 2026–27 season. However, the Division I Council is preparing to vote on a proposal to shorten the period for such a transition to three years. Should the proposal be approved in January 2025, the Lions would be eligible in 2025–26.

This was the first season for the university under its then-current identity. On November 7, 2024, after the Lions had played their first two games of the 2024–25 season, the Texas A&M University System Board of Regents approved the proposed change of the university's name to East Texas A&M University. The name change took effect immediately.

== Previous season ==
The Lions finished the 2023–24 season 13–20, 6–12 in Southland play, to finish in seventh place. They defeated Northwestern State, before falling to Nicholls in the second round of the Southland tournament.

== Preseason polls ==
=== Southland Conference Poll ===
The Southland Conference released its preseason poll on October 16, 2024. Receiving 54 votes overall, the Lions were picked in a tie to finish tenth in the conference.

Predicted finish	Team	Votes (1st place)
1	McNeese	242 (21)
2	Stephen F. Austin	208
3	Nicholls	205 (3)
4	Texas A&M–Corpus Christi	191
5	Lamar	143
6	Southeastern	121
7	Incarnate Word	117
8	UT Rio Grande Valley	112
9	Northwestern State	90
10	Texas A&M–Commerce	54
10	New Orleans	54
12	Houston Christian	48

=== Preseason All Conference ===
No Lions were selected as members of a preseason all–conference team.

== Roster ==
2024–25 East Texas A&M Lions men's basketball team
Players
Coaches

Pos.	#	Name	Height	Weight	Year	Previous school	Hometown
G	0	TJ Thomas	6 ft 2 in (1.88 m)	195 lb (88 kg)	Jr	Collin College	Memphis, TN
G/F	1	Scooter Jr. Williams	6 ft 5 in (1.96 m)	210 lb (95 kg)	Jr	Chattanooga State Community College	Clarksville, TN
G	2	Evan Phelps	6 ft 0 in (1.83 m)	180 lb (82 kg)	So	Duncanville High School	Duncanville, TX
G	3	Mykol Sanchez-Vega	6 ft 6 in (1.98 m)	175 lb (79 kg)	Jr	Indian River State College	Orlando, FL
G	4	Chris Adlam	6 ft 4 in (1.93 m)	185 lb (84 kg)	Fr	Houston Christian High School	Cypress, TX
F	5	Tay Mosher	6 ft 7 in (2.01 m)	215 lb (98 kg)	Jr	Otero College	The Colony, TX
G	8	Yusef Salih	6 ft 2 in (1.88 m)	192 lb (87 kg)	Sr	UIC	Gainesville, VA
G/F	10	Camerin James	6 ft 5 in (1.96 m)	200 lb (91 kg)	So	Hillsborough Community College	Apopka, FL
G	11	Khaliq Abdul-Mateen	6 ft 1 in (1.85 m)	186 lb (84 kg)	Sr	Cy-Lakes High School	Houston, TX
G	12	Adonis Holiman	5 ft 9 in (1.75 m)	165 lb (75 kg)	Fr	Atoka High School	McAlester, OK
F	21	KC Ugwuakazi	6 ft 8 in (2.03 m)	215 lb (98 kg)	So	Cheshire Academy	Boston, MA
F	23	Demarco Bethea	6 ft 8 in (2.03 m)	210 lb (95 kg)	Jr	Ranger College	Sellers, SC
F	24	Josh Taylor	6 ft 8 in (2.03 m)	205 lb (93 kg)	Sr	St. Thomas (FL)	Atlanta, GA
G	25	Brandon Taylor	6 ft 0 in (1.83 m)	175 lb (79 kg)	Sr	Labette Community College	Coppell, TX
G	30	Luke Coughran	6 ft 3 in (1.91 m)	180 lb (82 kg)	Fr	Tompkins High School	Katy, TX
F	35	Omar Elchazli	6 ft 8 in (2.03 m)	210 lb (95 kg)	So	Des Moines Area Community College	Katy, TX

Head coach

- Jaret von Rosenberg (Hartford)

Assistant coach(es)

- Coleman Furst (Tarleton State)
- A.J. Holland (Sioux Falls)
- Trey Conrod (East Texas A&M)
- Jared Kortsen (Emerson)
- Matthew Scott (Midwestern State)

Legend

- (C) Team captain
- (S) Suspended
- (I) Ineligible
- (W) Walk-on
- Injured
- Current redshirt

Roster
Last update: December 3, 2024

== Schedule and results ==
Date time, TV	Rank^{#}	Opponent^{#}	Result	Record	High points	High rebounds	High assists	Site (attendance) city, state
Regular season
November 4, 2024*; 7:00 p.m., B1G+		at Iowa; Kenny Arnold Classic	L 67–89	0–1	12 – K. Abdul-Mateen	6 – C. James	4 – S. Williams, Jr.	Carver–Hawkeye Arena (7,879); Iowa City, IA
November 6, 2024*; 7:00 p.m., Summit League Network		South Dakota; Kenny Arnold Classic	L 83–91	0–2	18 – K. Abdul-Mateen	7 – D. Bethea	3 – K. Abdul-Mateen	Sanford Coyote Sports Center (1,493); Vermillion, SD
November 8, 2024*; 7:00 p.m., SECN+/ESPN+		at No. 13 Texas A&M	L 55–87	0–3	12 – S. Williams, Jr.	4 – D. Bethea	3 – S. Williams, Jr.	Reed Arena (8,673); College Station, TX
November 13, 2024*; 6:30 p.m., ESPN+		Southern; Kenny Arnold Classic	W 70–68	1–3	18 – K. Abdul-Mateen	7 – D. Bethea	5 – S. Williams, Jr.	The Field House (624); Commerce, TX
November 19, 2024*; 6:00 p.m., FS1		at No. 2 UConn	L 46–81	1–4	18 – C. James	5 – K. Ugwuakazi	2 – K. Abdul-Mateen	Harry A. Gampel Pavilion (10,299); Storrs, CT
November 21, 2024*; 7:00 p.m., SECN+/ESPN+		at Oklahoma	L 56–84	1–5	9 – J. Taylor	9 – J. Taylor	3 – T. Thomas	Lloyd Noble Center (4,678); Norman, OK
November 25, 2024*; 6:00 p.m., NEC Front Row		at Stonehill	L 65–67	1–6	14 – S. Williams Jr.	6 – J. Taylor	2 – tied	Merkert Gymnasium (1,052); Easton, MA
November 30, 2024*; 1:00 p.m., ESPN+		Purdue Fort Wayne	L 57–77	1–7	19 – S. Williams Jr.	9 – J. Taylor	3 – tied	The Field House (334); Commerce, TX
December 5, 2024; 7:00 p.m., ESPN+		at Houston Christian	L 79–83	1–8 (0–1)	16 – S. Williams Jr.	7 – D. Bethea	7 – T. Thomas	Sharp Gymnasium (679); Houston, TX
December 7, 2024; 5:00 p.m., ESPN+		at Incarnate Word	L 53–65	1–9 (0–2)	10 – S. Williams Jr.	5 – D. Bethea	2 – tied	McDermott Center; San Antonio, TX
December 15, 2024*; 11:00 a.m., ESPN+		South Alabama	L 72–81	1–10	17 – tied	8 – D. Bethea	7 – T. Thomas	The Field House (217); Commerce, TX
December 18, 2024*; 11:00 a.m., ESPN+		Abilene Christian	W 68–67	2–10	19 – S. Williams, Jr.	6 – S. Williams, Jr.	5 – K. Abdul-Mateen	The Field House (1,611); Commerce, TX
December 21, 2024*; 4:00 p.m., ESPN+		at South Florida	L 62–88	2–11	12 – T. Mosher	7 – K. Abdul-Mateen	3 – S. Williams, Jr.	Yuengling Center (5,735); Tampa, FL
January 4, 2025; 2:10 p.m., ESPN+		McNeese	L 56–75	2–12 (0–3)	18 – Y. Salih	5 – tied	4 – K. Abdul-Mateen	The Field House (812); Commerce, TX
January 6, 2025; 2:10 p.m., ESPN+		Nicholls	L 61–83	2–13 (0–4)	12 – tied	4 – tied	4 – tied	The Field House (271); Commerce, TX
January 11, 2025; 1:00 p.m., ESPN+		at Northwestern State	L 67–75	2–14 (0–5)	18 – S. Williams Jr.	7 – D. Bethea	2 – tied	Prather Coliseum (289); Natchitoches, LA
January 13, 2025; 6:30 p.m., ESPN+		at UT Rio Grande Valley	L 55–57	2–15 (0–6)	11 – T. Mosher	6 – D. Bethea	5 – C. Adlam	UTRGV Fieldhouse (1,286); Edinburg, TX
January 18, 2025; 2:15 p.m., ESPN+		New Orleans	L 72–83	2–16 (0–7)	13 – J. Taylor	7 – T. Mosher	5 – T. Thomas	The Field House (489); Commerce, TX
January 20, 2025; 1:00 p.m., ESPN+		Southeastern Louisiana	L 68–76	2–17 (0–8)	13 – S. Williams, Jr.	5 – S. Williams, Jr.	5 – S. Williams, Jr.	The Field House (412); Commerce, TX
January 25, 2025; 6:00 p.m., ESPN+		at Lamar	L 58–61 ^{OT}	2–18 (0–9)	12 – S. Williams, Jr.	8 – T. Thomas	3 – T. Thomas	Neches Arena (1,912); Beaumont, TX
January 27, 2025; 6:30 p.m., ESPN+		at Stephen F. Austin	L 72–79	2–19 (0–10)	18 – K. Abdul-Mateen	6 – T. Mosher	5 – T. Thomas	William R. Johnson Coliseum (1,225); Nacogdoches, TX
February 1, 2025; 2:15 p.m., ESPN+		Northwestern State	W 72–50	3–19 (1–10)	16 – S. Williams, Jr.	8 – K. Ugwuakazi	6 – E. Phelps	The Field House (309); Commerce, TX
February 3, 2025; 6:30 p.m., ESPN+		Texas A&M–Corpus Christi	L 66–78	3–20 (1–11)	22 – C. Adlam	5 – J. Taylor	5 – E. Phelps	The Field House (742); Commerce, TX
February 8, 2025; 3:00 p.m., ESPN+		at Nicholls	L 65–81	3–21 (1–12)	22 – S. Williams, Jr.	9 – J. Taylor	6 – S. Williams, Jr.	Stopher Gymnasium (567); Thibodaux, LA
February 10, 2025; 6:00 p.m., ESPN+		at McNeese	L 51–67	3–22 (1–13)	16 – S. Williams, Jr.	6 – K. Ugwuakazi	4 – E. Phelps	The Legacy Center (2,883); Lake Charles, LA
February 15, 2025; 2:15 p.m., ESPN+		Lamar	L 55–65	3–23 (1–14)	11 – T. Thomas	5 – K. Ugwuakazi	4 – T. Thomas	The Field House; Commerce, TX
February 17, 2025; 6:30 p.m., ESPN+		Stephen F. Austin	L 74–76	3–24 (1–15)	17 – T. Mosher	6 – K. Ugwuakazi	6 – T. Thomas	The Field House (488); Commerce, TX
February 22, 2025; 3:30 p.m., ESPN+		at Southeastern Louisiana	L 65–83	3–25 (1–16)	17 – T. Thomas	7 – J. Taylor	2 – S. Williams, Jr.	Pride Roofing University Center (888); Hammond, LA
February 24, 2025; 6:30 p.m., ESPN+		at New Orleans	W 73–71	4–25 (2–16)	20 – T. Thomas	8 – K. Ugwuakazi	5 – E. Phelps	Lakefront Arena (850); New Orleans, LA
March 1, 2025; 2:15 p.m., ESPN+		Incarnate Word	L 68–75	4–26 (2–17)	14 – J. Taylor	4 – J. Taylor	6 – S. Williams, Jr.	The Field House (492); Commerce, TX
March 3, 2025; 6:30 p.m., ESPN+		Houston Christian	W 63–59	5–26 (3–17)	15 – K. Abdul–Mateen	11 – K. Ugwuakazi	5 – E. Phelps	The Field House (321); Commerce, TX
*Non-conference game. ^{#}Rankings from AP poll. (#) Tournament seedings in parentheses. All times are in Central.

== See also ==
- 2024–25 East Texas A&M Lions women's basketball team
