= 2024–25 Lamar Cardinals basketball team =

American college basketball season

2024–25 Lamar Cardinals basketball
- Conference: Southland Conference
- Record: 20–13 (14–6 Southland)
- Head coach: Alvin Brooks (4th season)
- Assistant coaches: Charles Harral (4th season); Wendell Moore (4th season); Ethan Quinn (1st season)
- Home arena: Neches Federal Credit Union Arena at the Montagne Center (Capacity: 10,080)

2024–25 Southland Conference men's basketball standings
	Conf.				Overall
Team	W		L	PCT	W		L	PCT
McNeese †	19	–	1	.950	28	–	7	.800
Lamar	14	–	6	.700	20	–	13	.606
Nicholls	13	–	7	.650	20	–	13	.606
Northwestern State	12	–	8	.600	16	–	16	.500
Texas A&M–Corpus Christi	12	–	8	.600	20	–	14	.588
Southeastern Louisiana	12	–	8	.600	18	–	14	.563
Incarnate Word	9	–	11	.450	19	–	17	.528
Houston Christian	9	–	11	.450	12	–	20	.375
UT Rio Grande Valley	8	–	12	.400	16	–	15	.516
Stephen F. Austin	7	–	13	.350	14	–	17	.452
East Texas A&M*	3	–	17	.150	5	–	26	.161
New Orleans	2	–	18	.100	4	–	27	.129
† 2025 Southland tournament winner * ineligible for the 2025 NCAA tournament due to transition period

The 2024–25 Lamar Cardinals basketball team represented Lamar University during the 2024–25 NCAA Division I men's basketball season. The Cardinals were led by fourth-year head coach Alvin Brooks and played their home games at the Neches Federal Credit Union Arena at the Montagne Center in Beaumont, Texas.

== Previous season ==
The Cardinals finished the season 19–14 overall and 12–6 in Southland Conference play for a fourth-place conference finish. As the fourth-seeded team, the Cardinals were 1–1 in the SLC tournament defeating eighth-seeded New Orleans 71–57 and losing to top-seeded McNeese 57–76 in the semifinal round.

== Preseason polls ==
=== Southland Conference Poll ===
The Southland Conference released its preseason poll on October 16, 2024. Receiving 143 votes overall, the Cardinals were picked to finish fifth in the conference.

Predicted finish	Team	Votes (1st place)
1	McNeese	242 (21)
2	Stephen F. Austin	208
3	Nicholls	205 (3)
4	Texas A&M–Corpus Christi	191
5	Lamar	143
6	Southeastern	121
7	Incarnate Word	117
8	UT Rio Grande Valley	112
9	Northwestern State	90
10	Texas A&M–Commerce	54
10	New Orleans	54
12	Houston Christian	48

=== Preseason All Conference ===
No Cardinals were selected as members of a preseason all-conference team.

== Roster ==
2024–25 Lamar Cardinals men's basketball team
Players
Coaches

Pos.	#	Name	Height	Weight	Year	Hometown
F	0	Cody Pennebaker	6 ft 5 in (1.96 m)	187 lb (85 kg)	Jr	Beaumont, TX
G	1	Alexis Marmolejos	6 ft 1 in (1.85 m)	180 lb (82 kg)	Jr	Santiago D.R.
G	2	Jayden Barrs	6 ft 1 in (1.85 m)	190 lb (86 kg)	Fr	Manor, TX
G	3	Danquez Dawsey	6 ft 2 in (1.88 m)	180 lb (82 kg)	Sr	Lawton, OK
F	4	Braden East	6 ft 9 in (2.06 m)	238 lb (108 kg)	Fr	Houston, TX
G	5	Jayden Gambrell	6 ft 3 in (1.91 m)	170 lb (77 kg)	Fr	Houston, TX
G	8	B. B. Knight	6 ft 6 in (1.98 m)	192 lb (87 kg)	Jr	Katy, TX
G	9	Jace Jeffries	5 ft 10 in (1.78 m)	165 lb (75 kg)	Fr	Tomball, TX
F	10	Errol White	6 ft 7 in (2.01 m)	205 lb (93 kg)	Sr	Queens, NY
F	11	Ja'Sean Jackson	6 ft 0 in (1.83 m)	170 lb (77 kg)	Sr	San Antonio, TX
F	13	Terrance Dixon, Jr	6 ft 8 in (2.03 m)	235 lb (107 kg)	Jr	Lawrenceville, GA
C	20	Adam Hamilton	6 ft 9 in (2.06 m)	223 lb (101 kg)	Sr	Buckeye, AZ
F	22	Andrew Holifield	6 ft 10 in (2.08 m)	185 lb (84 kg)	Jr	Woodbine, MD
F	32	Janko Bulajic	6 ft 10 in (2.08 m)	230 lb (104 kg)	Jr	Nikšić, Montenegro

Head coach

- Alvin Brooks (Lamar)

Assistant coach(es)

- Charles Harral (Texas Tech)
- Wendell Moore (Georgia Southern)
- Ethan Quinn (Minnesota)

Legend

- (C) Team captain
- (S) Suspended
- (I) Ineligible
- (W) Walk-on
- Injured
- Current redshirt

Roster
Last update: November 12, 2024

Additional source:

== Schedule and results ==
Date time, TV	Rank^{#}	Opponent^{#}	Result	Record	High points	High rebounds	High assists	Site (attendance) city, state
Exhibition
October 29, 2024*; 7:00 p.m., –		LSU–Alexandria	L 80–83	–	–	–	–	Neches Arena; Beaumont, TX
Regular season
November 4, 2024*; 4:00 p.m., ESPN+		Paul Quinn	W 113–42	1–0	20 – A. Holifield	10 – E. White	9 – J. Jackson	Neches Arena (1,436); Beaumont, TX
November 11, 2024*; 7:00 p.m., SECN		at No. 23 Texas A&M	L 71–97	1–1	23 – A. Marmolejos	10 – A. Holifield	3 – J. Bulajic	Reed Arena (7,195); College Station, TX
November 17, 2024*; 7:00 p.m., ESPN+		Sam Houston	L 72–85	1–2	15 – A. Holifield	7 – E. White	5 – C. Pennebaker	Neches Arena (1,848); Beaumont, TX
November 22, 2024*; 5:00 p.m., ESPN+		at Akron; Akron Classic	L 72–79	1–3	16 – J. Jackson	8 – A. Hamilton	3 – A. Hamilton	James A. Rhodes Arena (1,775); Akron, OH
November 23, 2024*; 7:30 p.m.		vs. Alabama State; Akron Classic	L 75–77	1–4	28 – A. Marmolejos	11 – A. Hamilton	5 – Jackson	James A. Rhodes Arena (120); Akron, OH
November 24, 2024; 11:00 a.m.		vs. Omaha; Akron Classic	L 59–65	1–5	15 – A. Marmolejos	6 – C. Pennebaker	5 – J. Jackson	James A. Rhodes Arena (46); Akron, OH
November 30, 2024*; 6:00 p.m., ESPN+		Our Lady of the Lake	W 88–54	2–5	18 – J. Jackson	9 – A. Hamilton	6 – A. Marmolejos	Neches Arena (1,118); Beaumont, TX
December 5, 2024; 12:00 p.m., ESPN+		at Texas A&M–Corpus Christi	W 65–61	3–5 (1–0)	17 – A. Marmolejos	11 – A. Hamilton	9 – J. Jackson	American Bank Center (1,052); Corpus Christi, TX
December 7, 2024; 4:30 p.m., ESPN+		at UT Rio Grande Valley	W 84–52	4–5 (2–0)	18 – A. Marmolejos	7 – A. Holifield	3 – Tied	UTRGV Fieldhouse (646); Edinburg, TX
December 14, 2024*; 12:00 p.m., ESPN+		at Louisiana	W 74–45	5–5	17 – A. Holifield	11 – Tied	4 – Tied	Cajundome (1,113); Lafayette, LA
December 17, 2024*; 7:00 p.m., ESPN+		at Southern Miss	W 69–65	6–5	20 – A. Marmolejos	7 – A. Holifield	5 – J. Bulajic	Reed Green Coliseum (2,829); Hattiesburg, MS
December 21, 2024*; 12:00 p.m., ESPN+		at Texas Tech	L 57–101	6–6	11 – A. Marmolehos	8 – A. Holifield	4 – C. Pennebaker	United Supermarkets Arena (10,013); Lubbock, TX
December 30, 2024*; 6:00 p.m., ESPN+		Texas A&M–San Antonio	W 82–65	7–6	17 – A. Marmolejos	14 – C. Pennebaker	7 – C. Pennebaker	Neches Arena (2,130); Beaumont, TX
January 4, 2025; 6:00 p.m., ESPN+		Houston Christian	W 63–61	8–6 (3–0)	21 – A. Marmolejos	8 – A. Hamilton	6 – J. Jackson	Neches Arena (1,533); Beaumont, TX
January 6, 2025; 7:00 p.m., ESPN+		Incarnate Word	W 72–58	9–6 (4–0)	16 – A. Hamilton	8 – A. Hamilton	10 – J. Jackson	Neches Arena (1,333); Beaumont, TX
January 11, 2025; 7:00 p.m., ESPN+		Stephen F. Austin	L 63–72	9–7 (4–1)	13 – A. Holifield	6 – A. Hamilton	3 – J. Jackson	Neches Arena; Beaumont, TX
January 13, 2025; 7:00 p.m., ESPN+		New Orleans	L 62–68	9–8 (4–2)	15 – D. Dawsey	9 – A. Marmolejos	4 – C. Pennebaker	Neches Arena (1,019); Beaumont, TX
January 18, 2025; 4:00 p.m., ESPN+		at McNeese; Battle of the Border (rivalry)	L 64–75	9–9 (4–3)	20 – A. Marmolejos	8 – A. Hamilton	5 – J. Jackson	The Legacy Center (4,081); Lake Charles, LA
January 20, 2025; 1:00 p.m., ESPN+		at Nicholls	W 78–74	10–9 (5–3)	18 – J. Jackson	9 – A. Hamilton	3 – J. Jackson	Stopher Gymnasium (301); Thibodaux
January 25, 2025; 6:00 p.m., ESPN+		East Texas A&M	W 61–58 ^{OT}	11–9 (6–3)	24 – A. Marmolejos	11 – E. White	4 – C. Pennebaker	Neches Arena (1,912); Beaumont, TX
January 27, 2025; 7:00 p.m., ESPN+		Northwestern State	W 69–59	12–9 (7–3)	14 – A. Marmolejos	14 – A. Hamilton	3 – Tied	Neches Arena (1,706); Beaumont, TX
February 1, 2025; 2:00 p.m., ESPN+		at Stephen F. Austin	W 67–62	13–9 (8–3)	12 – J. Jackson	7 – A. Marmolejos	5 – J. Jackson	William R. Johnson Coliseum (1,674); Nacogdoches, TX
February 3, 2025; 6:00 p.m., ESPN+		at Southeastern Louisiana	L 79–81	13–10 (8–4)	19 – D. Dawsey	8 – A. Hamilton	3 – J. Barrs	Pride Roofing University Center (546); Hammond, LA
February 8, 2025; 6:00 p.m., ESPN+		UT Rio Grande Valley	W 70–68	14–10 (9–4)	19 – A. Marmolejos	8 – E. White	3 – J. Jackson	Neches Arena (1,753); Beaumont, TX
February 10, 2025; 7:00 p.m., ESPN+		Texas A&M–Corpus Christi	W 67–56	15–10 (10–4)	15 – J. Jackson	10 – A. Hamilton	3 – Tied	Neches Arena (1,637); Beaumont, TX
February 15, 2025; 2:15 p.m., ESPN+		at East Texas A&M	W 65–55	16–10 (11–4)	13 – A. Marmolejos	11 – E. White	6 – D. Dawsey	The Field House (499); Commerce, TX
February 17, 2025; 6:30 p.m., ESPN+		at Northwestern State	W 75–65	17–10 (12–4)	22 – A. Holifield	7 – A. Hamilton	3 – A. Marmolejos	Prather Coliseum (999); Natchitoches, LA
February 22, 2025; 3:30 p.m., ESPN+		at Houston Christian	W 66–58	18–10 (13–4)	17 – J. Jackson	7 – J. Bulajic	5 – J. Jackson	Sharp Gymnasium (765); Houston, TX
February 24, 2025; 6:30 p.m., ESPN+		at Incarnate Word	L 61–73	18–11 (13–5)	16 – J. Jackson	9 – A. Hamilton	3 – A. Hamilton	McDermott Convocation Center (347); San Antonio, TX
March 1 2025; 6:00 p.m., ESPN+		McNeese; Battle of the Border (rivalry)	L 66–68	18–12 (13–6)	19 – J. Jackson	8 – A. Hamilton	5 – J. Jackson	Neches Arena (5,746); Beaumont, TX
March 3, 2025; 7:00 p.m., ESPN+		Nicholls	W 65–53	19–12 (14–6)	15 – A. Marmolejos	10 – E. White	5 – D. Dawsey	Neches Arena (1,923); Beaumont, TX
Southland tournament
March 11, 2025; 8:30 pm, ESPN+	(2)	vs. (3) Nicholls; Semifinals	W 58–55	20–12	17 – A. Marmolejos	9 – E. White	5 – J. Jackson	The Legacy Center (3,782); Lake Charles, LA
March 12, 2025; 4:00 pm, ESPN2	(2)	at (1) McNeese; Championship	L 54–63	20–13	18 – A. Marmolejos	9 – Tied	2 – J. Jackson	The Legacy Center (4,106); Lake Charles, LA
*Non-conference game. ^{#}Rankings from AP poll. (#) Tournament seedings in parentheses. All times are in Central.

== Conference awards and honors ==
=== Weekly awards ===
Weekly honors
Honors	Player	Position	Date awarded	Ref.
SLC Men's Basketball Player of the Week	Alexis Marmolejos	G	December 9, 2024	
SLC Men's Basketball Player of the Week	Andrew Holifield	F	December 16, 2024	
SLC Men's Basketball Player of the Week	Adam Hamilton	C	March 6, 2025	

== See also ==
2024–25 Lamar Lady Cardinals basketball team
