= 2024–25 Northwestern State Demons basketball team =

American college basketball season

2024–25 Northwestern State Demons basketball
- Conference: Southland Conference
- Record: 16–16 (12–8 Southland)
- Head coach: Rick Cabrera (2nd season)
- Associate head coach: Anthony Figueroa
- Assistant coaches: TJ Cox; Luke Darst
- Home arena: Prather Coliseum

2024–25 Southland Conference men's basketball standings
	Conf.				Overall
Team	W		L	PCT	W		L	PCT
McNeese †	19	–	1	.950	28	–	7	.800
Lamar	14	–	6	.700	20	–	13	.606
Nicholls	13	–	7	.650	20	–	13	.606
Northwestern State	12	–	8	.600	16	–	16	.500
Texas A&M–Corpus Christi	12	–	8	.600	20	–	14	.588
Southeastern Louisiana	12	–	8	.600	18	–	14	.563
Incarnate Word	9	–	11	.450	19	–	17	.528
Houston Christian	9	–	11	.450	12	–	20	.375
UT Rio Grande Valley	8	–	12	.400	16	–	15	.516
Stephen F. Austin	7	–	13	.350	14	–	17	.452
East Texas A&M*	3	–	17	.150	5	–	26	.161
New Orleans	2	–	18	.100	4	–	27	.129
† 2025 Southland tournament winner * ineligible for the 2025 NCAA tournament due to transition period

The 2024–25 Northwestern State Demons basketball team represented Northwestern State University in the 2024–25 NCAA Division I men's basketball season. The Demons, led by second-year head coach Rick Cabrera, played their home games at Prather Coliseum in Natchitoches, Louisiana as members of the Southland Conference.

== Previous season ==
The Demons finished the 2023–24 season 9–23, 7–11 in Southland play to finish in sixth place. They were defeated by Texas A&M–Commerce in the first round of the Southland tournament.

== Preseason polls ==
=== Southland Conference Poll ===
The Southland Conference released its preseason poll on October 16, 2024. Receiving 90 votes overall, the Demons were picked to finish ninth in the conference.

Predicted finish	Team	Votes (1st place)
1	McNeese	242 (21)
2	Stephen F. Austin	208
3	Nicholls	205 (3)
4	Texas A&M–Corpus Christi	191
5	Lamar	143
6	Southeastern	121
7	Incarnate Word	117
8	UT Rio Grande Valley	112
9	Northwestern State	90
10	Texas A&M–Commerce	54
10	New Orleans	54
12	Houston Christian	48

=== Preseason All Conference ===
No Demons were selected as members of a preseason all-conference team.

== Roster ==
2024–25 Northwestern State Demons men's basketball team
Players
Coaches

Pos.	#	Name	Height	Weight	Year	Previous school	Hometown
F	0	Lado Laku	7 ft 0 in (2.13 m)	220 lb (100 kg)	Sr	Arkansas State	Dallas, Texas
F	1	JT Warren	6 ft 7 in (2.01 m)	205 lb (93 kg)	RS Jr	Chipola College	Tifton, Georgia
F	2	Jerald Colonel	6 ft 9 in (2.06 m)	200 lb (91 kg)	Jr	Chipola College	Savannah, Georgia
G	3	Landyn Jumawan	6 ft 4 in (1.93 m)	190 lb (86 kg)	Jr	Lee College	Whitmore Village, Hawaii
G	4	Mitch Williams	6 ft 2 in (1.88 m)	185 lb (84 kg)	RS Fr	Ranger College	Colleyville, Texas
G	5	Micah Thomas	6 ft 0 in (1.83 m)	165 lb (75 kg)	Jr	Nicholls	Oklahoma City, Oklahoma
G	6	Dontae Walker	6 ft 6 in (1.98 m)	210 lb (95 kg)	Jr	Chipola College	Bronx, New York
G	7	Love Bettis	5 ft 11 in (1.8 m)	165 lb (75 kg)	Jr	Florida A&M	Pensacola, Florida
F	9	Addison Patterson	6 ft 7 in (2.01 m)	205 lb (93 kg)	Sr	Tallahassee State College	Mississauga, Ontario
G	10	Jon Sanders II	6 ft 2 in (1.88 m)	190 lb (86 kg)	Sr	Coastal Carolina	Detroit, Michigan
G	11	Chris Mubiru	6 ft 5 in (1.96 m)	199 lb (90 kg)	So	West Oaks Academy	Philadelphia, Pennsylvania
G	12	Ayden Warren	5 ft 10 in (1.78 m)	170 lb (77 kg)	Fr	St. Mary's High School	Alexandria, Louisiana
G	13	Justin Redmond	6 ft 2 in (1.88 m)	170 lb (77 kg)	Fr	DME Academy	Snellville, Georgia
C	21	J.C. Riley Jr.	6 ft 10 in (2.08 m)	250 lb (113 kg)	Jr	Tallahassee State College	Atlanta, Georgia
F	23	Willie Williams	6 ft 6 in (1.98 m)	235 lb (107 kg)	Jr	Kilgore College	Houston, Texas

Head coach

- Rick Cabrera (Tennessee Tech)

Assistant coach(es)

- Anthony Figueroa (Millikin)
- TJ Cox (Covenant)
- Luke Darst (Arkansas State)

Legend

- (C) Team captain
- (S) Suspended
- (I) Ineligible
- (W) Walk-on
- Injured
- Current redshirt

Roster
Last update: December 3, 2024

== Schedule and results ==
Date time, TV	Rank^{#}	Opponent^{#}	Result	Record	High points	High rebounds	High assists	Site (attendance) city, state
Regular season
November 4, 2024*; 6:30 p.m., ESPN+		Dallas Christian	W 96–55	1–0	16 – J. Sanders II	5 – A. Patterson	5 – M. Thomas	Prather Coliseum (1,001); Natchitoches, LA
November 8, 2024*; 8:00 p.m., ESPN+		at Texas Tech	L 65–86	1–1	18 – J. Sanders II	6 – J. Warren	2 – M. Thomas	United Supermarkets Arena (13,610); Lubbock, TX
November 11, 2024*; 7:00 p.m., SECN+/ESPN+		at Oklahoma	L 57–73	1–2	20 – M. Thomas	10 – W. Williams	2 – W. Williams	Lloyd Noble Center (4,742); Norman, OK
November 16, 2024*; 2:00 p.m., ESPN+		at Rice	L 75–77 ^{OT}	1–3	27 – J. Sanders II	7 – A. Patterson	2 – J. Sanders II	Tudor Fieldhouse (1,644); Houston, TX
November 19, 2024*; 6:30 p.m., ESPN+		John Melvin; Exhibition	W 121–49	–	29 – Walker	8 – Riley	8 – Sanders	Prather Coliseum (328); Natchitoches, LA
November 22, 2024*; 6:30 p.m., ESPN+		Louisiana–Monroe; City of Lights MTE	L 63–65	1–4	16 – A. Patterson	8 – J. Colonel	8 – A. Patterson	Prather Coliseum (388); Natchitoches, LA
November 24, 2024*; 2:00 p.m., ESPN+		North Alabama; City of Lights MTE	W 71–58	2–4	13 – C. Muribu	7 – W. Williams	6 – W. Williams	Prather Coliseum (228); Natchitoches, LA
November 29, 2024*; 7:00 p.m., ESPN+		at LSU	L 53–77	2–5	14 – J. Sanders II	9 – A. Patterson	2 – Tied	Pete Maravich Assembly Center (8,042); Baton Rouge, LA
December 5, 2024; 7:00 p.m., ESPN+		at Incarnate Word	W 72–70	3–5 (1–0)	15 – M. Thomas	8 – W. Williams	6 – J. Sanders	McDermott Center (452); San Antonio, TX
December 7, 2024; 3:30 p.m., ESPN+		at Houston Christian	W 64–57	4–5 (2–0)	25 – A. Patterson	11 – W. Williams	3 – Tied	Sharp Gymnasium (493); Houston, TX
December 14, 2024*; 3:30 p.m., ACCN		at California	L 66–84	4–6	15 – L. Jumawan	6 – J. Sanders	6 – J. Sanders	Haas Pavilion (2,916); Berkeley, CA
December 20, 2024*; 1:00 p.m., ESPN+		Southern–New Orleans	W 89–79	5–6	33 – A. Patterson	10 – A. Patterson	5 – J. Sanders II	Prather Coliseum (298); Natchitoches, LA
December 29, 2024*; 11:00 a.m., SECN+		at Texas	L 53–77	5–7	19 – M. Thomas	5 – Tied	2 – L. Bettis	Moody Center (10,565); Austin, TX
January 4, 2025; 3:30 p.m., ESPN+		Nicholls	W 68–66	6–7 (3–0)	18 – M. Thomas	12 – A. Patterson	4 – A. Patterson	Prather Coliseum (245); Natchitoches, LA
January 6, 2025; 6:30 p.m., ESPN+		McNeese	L 69–92	6–8 (3–1)	14 – M. Thomas	6 – J. Colonel	2 – Tied	Prather Coliseum (387); Natchitoches, LA
January 11, 2025; 1:00 p.m., ESPN+		East Texas A&M	W 75–67	7–8 (4–1)	25 – M. Thomas	10 – W. Williams	7 – A. Patterson	Prather Coliseum (289); Natchitoches, LA
January 13, 2025; 7:00 p.m., ESPN+		at Texas A&M–Corpus Christi	L 64–73	7–9 (4–2)	15 – M. Thomas	9 – W. Williams	7 – A. Patterson	American Bank Center (1,366); Corpus Christi, TX
January 18, 2025; 3:30 p.m., ESPN+		Southeastern Louisiana	L 64–65	7–10 (4–3)	16 – A. Patterson	10 – W. Williams	4 – A. Patterson	Prather Coliseum (418); Natchitoches, LA
January 20, 2025; 6:30 p.m., ESPN+		New Orleans	W 73–61	8–10 (5–3)	17 – A. Patterson	11 – A. Patterson	3 – M. Thomas	Prather Coliseum (389); Natchitoches, LA
January 25, 2025; 5:00 p.m., ESPN+		at Stephen F. Austin	W 57–54 ^{OT}	9–10 (6–3)	19 – A. Patterson	11 – W. Williams	4 – A. Patterson	William R. Johnson Coliseum (1,999); Nacogdoches, TX
January 27, 2025; 7:00 p.m., ESPN+		at Lamar	L 59–69	9–11 (6–4)	14 – A. Patterson	10 – J. Colonel	3 – Tied	Neches Arena (1,706); Beaumont, TX
February 1, 2025; 2:15 p.m., ESPN+		at East Texas A&M	L 50–72	9–12 (6–5)	13 – J. Warren	10 – J. Colonel	5 – A. Patterson	The Field House (504); Commerce, TX
February 3, 2025; 6:30 p.m., ESPN+		UT Rio Grande Valley	W 79–63	10–12 (7–5)	18 – M. Thomas	10 – W. Williams	3 – 3 tied	Prather Coliseum (508); Natchitoches, LA
February 8, 2025; 4:00 p.m., ESPN+		McNeese	L 50–65	10–13 (7–6)	13 – M. Thomas	6 – L. Jumawan	3 – L. Bettis	The Legacy Center (3,670); Lake Charles, LA
February 10, 2025; 4:00 p.m., ESPN+		at Nicholls	W 72–60	11–13 (8–6)	16 – L. Bettis	10 – W. Williams	2 – L. Bettis	Stopher Gymnasium (522); Thibodaux, LA
February 15, 2025; 3:30 p.m., ESPN+		Stephen F. Austin	L 68–70	11–14 (8–7)	23 – A. Patterson	10 – A. Patterson	4 – L. Bettis	Prather Coliseum (1,997); Natchitoches, LA
February 17, 2025; 6:30 p.m., ESPN+		Lamar	L 65–75	11–15 (8–8)	16 – M. Thomas	6 – W. Williams	5 – A. Patterson	Prather Coliseum (999); Natchitoches, LA
February 22, 2025; 5:00 p.m., ESPN+		at New Orleans	W 73–66	12–15 (9–8)	23 – M. Thomas	9 – J. Colonel	4 – L. Bettis	Lakefront Arena (947); New Orleans, LA
February 24, 2025; 6:00 p.m., ESPN+		at Southeastern Louisiana	W 72–69	13–15 (10–8)	24 – M. Thomas	10 – W. Williams	4 – L. Bettis	Pride Roofing University Center (564); Hammond, LA
March 1, 2025; 3:30 p.m., ESPN+		Houston Christian	W 61–56	14–15 (11–8)	26 – A. Patterson	14 – J. Colonel	2 – A. Patterson	Prather Coliseum (429); Natchitoches, LA
March 3, 2025; 6:30 p.m., ESPN+		Incarnate Word	L 57–73	15–15 (12–8)	19 – M. Thomas	6 – J. Colonel	3 – J. Colonel	Prather Coliseum (729); Natchitoches, LA
Southland tournament
March 10, 2025; 5:00 pm, ESPN+	(4)	vs. (5) Texas A&M–Corpus Christi; Quarterfinal	W 66–63	16–15	17 – L. Bettis	13 – W. Williams	5 – A. Patterson	The Legacy Center; Lake Charles, LA
March 11, 2025; 6:00 pm, ESPNU	(4)	at (1) McNeese; Semifinals	L 64–83	16–16	19 – M. Thomas	10 – W. Williams	6 – A. Patterson	The Legacy Center; Lake Charles, LA
*Non-conference game. ^{#}Rankings from AP poll. (#) Tournament seedings in parentheses. All times are in Central.

== Conference awards and honors ==
=== Weekly awards ===
Weekly honors
Honors	Player	Position	Date awarded	Ref.
SLC Men's Basketball Player of the Week	Addison Patterson	F	January 27, 2025	

== See also ==
- 2024–25 Northwestern State Lady Demons basketball team
