= 2024–25 New Orleans Privateers men's basketball team =

American college basketball season

2024–25 New Orleans Privateers men's basketball
- Conference: Southland Conference
- Record: 4–27 (2–18 Southland)
- Head coach: Stacy Hollowell (1st season)
- Assistant coaches: Trey Lindsey; Javan Felix; Andrew Fava; Silvey Dominguez
- Home arena: Lakefront Arena

2024–25 Southland Conference men's basketball standings
	Conf.				Overall
Team	W		L	PCT	W		L	PCT
McNeese †	19	–	1	.950	28	–	7	.800
Lamar	14	–	6	.700	20	–	13	.606
Nicholls	13	–	7	.650	20	–	13	.606
Northwestern State	12	–	8	.600	16	–	16	.500
Texas A&M–Corpus Christi	12	–	8	.600	20	–	14	.588
Southeastern Louisiana	12	–	8	.600	18	–	14	.563
Incarnate Word	9	–	11	.450	19	–	17	.528
Houston Christian	9	–	11	.450	12	–	20	.375
UT Rio Grande Valley	8	–	12	.400	16	–	15	.516
Stephen F. Austin	7	–	13	.350	14	–	17	.452
East Texas A&M*	3	–	17	.150	5	–	26	.161
New Orleans	2	–	18	.100	4	–	27	.129
† 2025 Southland tournament winner * ineligible for the 2025 NCAA tournament due to transition period

The 2024–25 New Orleans Privateers men's basketball team represented the University of New Orleans during the 2024–25 NCAA Division I men's basketball season. The Privateers were led by first-year head coach Stacy Hollowell and played their home games at Lakefront Arena as members of the Southland Conference. The Privateers finished the 2024–25 season 4–27, 2–18 in conference play to finish in twelfth place. Failing to qualify for the SLC tournament, the Privateers' season ended with a 62–95 loss to Texas A&M–Corpus Christi.

== Previous season ==
The Privateers finished the 2023–24 season 10–23, 4–14 in Southland play to finish in a tie for eighth place. They upset Southeastern Louisiana, before falling to Lamar in the second round of the Southland tournament.

On April 19, 2024, head coach Mark Slessinger left the program after 13 years at the helm, in order to take the associate head coaching position at Indiana State. On April 25, the school announced that they would be hiring Texas Southern assistant coach Stacy Hollowell as the team's next head coach.

== Preseason polls ==
=== Southland Conference Poll ===
The Southland Conference released its preseason poll on October 16, 2024. Receiving 54 votes overall, the Privateers were picked to finish tenth in the conference.

Predicted finish	Team	Votes (1st place)
1	McNeese	242 (21)
2	Stephen F. Austin	208
3	Nicholls	205 (3)
4	Texas A&M–Corpus Christi	191
5	Lamar	143
6	Southeastern	121
7	Incarnate Word	117
8	UT Rio Grande Valley	112
9	Northwestern State	90
10	Texas A&M–Commerce	54
10	New Orleans	54
12	Houston Christian	48

=== Preseason All Conference ===
No Privateers were selected as members of a preseason all-conference team.

== Roster ==
2024–25 New Orleans Privateers men's basketball team
Players
Coaches

Pos.	#	Name	Height	Weight	Year	Previous school	Hometown
G	1	JR Jacobs	5 ft 10 in (1.78 m)	170 lb (77 kg)	So	Walters State Community College	Memphis, Tennessee
G	2	Jah Short	6 ft 3 in (1.91 m)	180 lb (82 kg)	So	Farmville High School	Greenville, North Carolina
G	3	Theo Grant	6 ft 3 in (1.91 m)	170 lb (77 kg)	Jr	Temple College	Schertz, Texas
F	4	Omarion Henry	6 ft 7 in (2.01 m)	195 lb (88 kg)	Jr	Link Academy	St. Louis, Missouri
G	5	James White	6 ft 5 in (1.96 m)	202 lb (92 kg)	Sr	UAB	Conyers, Georgia
G	10	Dae Dae Hunter	5 ft 11 in (1.8 m)	170 lb (77 kg)	Jr	Pearl River Community College	Como, Mississippi
F	11	Leland Coleman	6 ft 8 in (2.03 m)	190 lb (86 kg)	Fr	Hargrave Military Academy	Richmond, Virginia
G	13	Jamond "Turk" Vincent	6 ft 4 in (1.93 m)	215 lb (98 kg)	Sr	L.B. Landry High School	New Orleans, Louisiana
G	15	Grant Kemp	5 ft 9 in (1.75 m)	165 lb (75 kg)	Jr	LSU–Alexandria	Madisonville, Louisiana
F	20	Luke Davis	6 ft 9 in (2.06 m)	220 lb (100 kg)	Sr	Midland College	Winterville, North Carolina
F	22	Kerwin Prince	6 ft 8 in (2.03 m)	225 lb (102 kg)	Sr	South Plains College	Waterbury, Connecticut
F	23	MJ Thomas	6 ft 8 in (2.03 m)	205 lb (93 kg)	Fr	Link Year Prep	Denton, Texas
G	24	Kohen Rowbatham	6 ft 0 in (1.83 m)	200 lb (91 kg)	Fr	St. Thomas Aquinas High School	Metairie, Louisiana
F	32	Jackson Sowards	6 ft 7 in (2.01 m)	185 lb (84 kg)	Fr	Metro Christian Academy	Tulsa, Oklahoma

Head coach

- Stacy Hollowell (St. Edward's)

Assistant coach(es)

- Trey Lindsey (Louisiana–Monroe)
- Javan Felix (Texas)
- Andrew Fava (Florida)
- Silvey Dominguez (New Mexico)

Legend

- (C) Team captain
- (S) Suspended
- (I) Ineligible
- (W) Walk-on
- Injured
- Current redshirt

Roster
Last update: December 3, 2024

== Schedule and results ==
Date time, TV	Rank^{#}	Opponent^{#}	Result	Record	High points	High rebounds	High assists	Site (attendance) city, state
Exhibition
October 22, 2024*; 7:00 p.m., –		Southern Miss	L 102–105 ^{OT}	–	23 – J. White	23 – J. White	7 – J. Jacobs	Lakefront Arena; New Orleans, LA
Regular season
November 5, 2024*; 7:00 p.m., ESPN+		at Kansas State	L 65–89	0–1	19 – J. Short	8 – J. White	4 – J. Short	Bramlage Coliseum (9,155); Manhattan, KS
November 9, 2024*; 4:00 p.m., ESPN+		Troy; Homecoming	L 61–78	0–2	23 – J. White	11 – M. Thomas	12 – J. Jacobs	Lakefront Arena (1,028); New Orleans, LA
November 14, 2024*; 3:00 p.m., ESPN+		vs. Lindenwood; Urban–Bennett Invitational MTE	W 82–74	1–2	20 – J. White	11 – J. White	6 – J. Jacobs	UPMC Events Center; Moon, PA
November 15, 2024*; 3:00 p.m., ESPN+		vs. Stonehill; Urban–Bennett Invitational MTE	L 54–80	1–3	15 – T. Grant	8 – J. White	2 – J. Short	UPMC Events Center; Moon, PA
November 17, 2024*; 3:00 p.m., ESPN+		at Robert Morris; Urban–Bennett Invitational MTE	L 62–73	1–4	26 – J. White	8 – J. White	3 – J. Short	UPMC Events Center (206); Moon, PA
November 22, 2024*; 6:30 p.m., ESPN+		at Tulane	W 93–87 ^{OT}	2–4	31 – J. White	9 – M. Thomas	7 – J. Jacobs	Devlin Fieldhouse (1,293); New Orleans, LA
November 27, 2024*; 1:00 p.m., ESPN+		at No. 17 Baylor	L 60–91	2–5	18 – D. Hunter	7 – Tied	5 – J. White	Foster Pavilion (7,500); Waco, TX
December 7, 2024; 1:00 p.m., ESPN+		at Nicholls	L 70–73	2–6 (0–1)	16 – M. Thomas	9 – Tied	4 – J. Jacobs	Stopher Gymnasium (544); Thibodaux, LA
December 15, 2024*; 1:00 p.m., BTN		at Iowa	L 57–104	2–7	24 – J. White	11 – J. Short	3 – Tied	Carver–Hawkeye Arena (9,410); Iowa City, IA
December 19, 2024*; 7:00 p.m., SECN+		at Texas	L 62–98	2–8	16 – D. Hunter	9 – M. Thomas	3 – J. Jacobs	Moody Center (10,565); Austin, TX
December 22, 2024*; 2:00 p.m., SECN+		at LSU	L 70–86	2–9	24 – J. White	11 – J. White	3 – J. Jacobs	Pete Maravich Assembly Center (8,278); Baton Rouge, LA
December 28, 2024; 4:00 p.m., ESPN+		at McNeese	L 61–86	2–10 (0–2)	20 – J. White	11 – M. Thomas	4 – J. Short	The Legacy Center (3,130); Lake Charles, LA
December 30, 2024*; 2:00 p.m., SECN+		at Vanderbilt	L 56–100	2–11	18 – J. White	7 – J. Short	5 – J. Short	Memorial Gymnasium (7,302); Nashville, TN
January 4, 2025; 5:00 p.m., ESPN+		UT Rio Grande Valley	L 64–76	2–12 (0–3)	23 – J. White	11 – M. Thomas	3 – Tied	Lakefront Arena (644); New Orleans, LA
January 6, 2025; 6:30 p.m., ESPN+		Texas A&M–Corpus Christi	L 83–97	2–13 (0–4)	25 – T. Grant	6 – L. Davis	5 – J. Short	Lakefront Arena (501); New Orleans, LA
January 11, 2025; 5:00 p.m., ESPN+		Southeastern Louisiana	L 71–91	2–14 (0–5)	18 – M. Thomas	7 – L. Davis	5 – J. Short	Lakefront Arena (729); New Orleans, LA
January 13, 2025; 7:00 p.m., ESPN+		at Lamar	W 68–62	3–14 (1–5)	12 – D. Hunter	9 – M. Thomas	4 – Tied	Neches Arena (1,019); Beaumont, TX
January 18, 2025; 2:15 p.m., ESPN+		at East Texas A&M	W 82–73	4–14 (2–5)	28 – J. Vincent	7 – J. Vincent	6 – J. Short	The Field House (489); Commerce, TX
January 20, 2025; 6:30 p.m., ESPN+		at Northwestern State	L 61–73	4–15 (2–6)	24 – J. Vincent	6 – J. Short	3 – J. White	Prather Coliseum (389); Natchitoches, LA
January 25, 2025; 5:00 p.m., ESPN+		Houston Christian	L 76–86	4–16 (2–7)	29 – J. White	9 – J. White	6 – J. Short	Lakefront Arena (964); New Orleans, LA
January 27, 2025; 6:30 p.m., ESPN+		Incarnate Word	L 58–74	4–17 (2–8)	15 – J. white	6 – M. Thomas	6 – J. Short	Lakefront Arena (604); New Orleans, LA
February 1, 2025; 3:30 p.m., ESPN+		at Southeastern Louisiana	L 68–76	4–18 (2–9)	22 – M. Thomas	11 – M. Thomas	6 – J. Jacobs	Pride Roofing University Center (633); Hammond, LA
February 3, 2025; 3:30 p.m., ESPN+		Stephen F. Austin	L 85–88 ^{OT}	4–19 (2–10)	28 – K. Rowbatham	11 – L. Coleman	16 – J. Jacobs	Lakefront Arena (455); New Orleans, LA
February 8, 2025; 3:30 p.m., ESPN+		at Houston Christian	L 68–81	4–20 (2–11)	18 – M. Thomas	11 – M. Thomas	2 – J. Jacobs	Sharp Gymnasium (779); Houston, TX
February 10, 2025; 6:30 p.m., ESPN+		at Incarnate Word	L 65–75	4–21 (2–12)	32 – M. Thomas	11 – M. Thomas	2 – J. Jacobs	McDermott Center (79); San Antonio, TX
February 15, 2025; 5:00 p.m., ESPN+		McNeese	L 64–78	4–22 (2–13)	15 – L. Coleman	10 – M. Thomas	4 – L. Coleman	Lakefront Arena (737); New Orleans, LA
February 17, 2025; 6:00 p.m., ESPN+		Nicholls	L 62–78	4–23 (2–14)	12 – M. Thomas	17 – M. Thomas	5 – J. Jacobs	Lakefront Arena (738); New Orleans, LA
February 22, 2025; 4:00 p.m., ESPN+		Northwestern State	L 66–73	4–24 (2–15)	20 – K. Rowbatham	9 – L. Davis	3 – K. Rowbatham	Lakefront Arena (947); New Orleans, LA
February 24, 2025; 6:30 p.m., ESPN+		East Texas A&M	L 71–73	4–25 (2–16)	16 – M. Thomas	18 – M. Thomas	7 – J. Jacobs	Lakefront Arena (850); New Orleans, LA
March 1, 2025; 4:30 p.m., ESPN+		at UT Rio Grande Valley	L 78–88	4–26 (2–17)	20 – J. Jacobs	11 – G. Kemp	4 – J. Jacobs	UTRGV Fieldhouse (1,079); Edinburg, TX
March 3, 2025; 7:00 p.m., ESPN+		at Texas A&M–Corpus Christi	L 62–95	4–27 (2–18)	18 – L. Davis	11 – L. Davis	4 – J. Jacobs	American Bank Center (1,511); Corpus Christi, TX
*Non-conference game. ^{#}Rankings from AP poll. (#) Tournament seedings in parentheses. All times are in Central.

== See also ==
- 2024–25 New Orleans Privateers women's basketball team
