= 2026–27 Nicholls Colonels men's basketball team =

American college basketball season

2026–27 Nicholls Colonels men's basketball
- Conference: Southland Conference
- Record: 1–2 (0–0 Southland)
- Head coach: Darion Brown (1st season)
- Associate head coach: Jeremiah Bozeman
- Assistant coaches: Ty Windy; Jayden Saddler; Tyrease Terrell; Jahmal Manning
- Home arena: Stopher Gymnasium

2026–27 Southland Conference men's basketball standings
	Conf.				Overall
Team	W		L	PCT	W		L	PCT
Houston Christian	0	–	0	–	3	–	0	1.000
Stephen F. Austin	0	–	0	–	3	–	0	1.000
East Texas A&M	0	–	0	–	2	–	1	.667
Lamar	0	–	0	–	2	–	1	.667
McNeese	0	–	0	–	2	–	1	.667
Texas A&M–Corpus Christi	0	–	0	–	2	–	1	.667
UT Rio Grande Valley	0	–	0	–	2	–	1	.667
LSU New Orleans	0	–	0	–	1	–	1	.500
Nicholls	0	–	0	–	1	–	2	.333
Southeastern Louisiana	0	–	0	–	1	–	2	.333
Northwestern State	0	–	0	–	1	–	3	.250
Incarnate Word	0	–	0	–	0	–	4	.000
† 2027 Southland tournament winner As of November 13, 2026; Rankings from AP poll

The 2026–27 Nicholls Colonels men's basketball team represents Nicholls State University during the 2026–27 NCAA Division I men's basketball season. The Colonels, led by first-year head coach Darion Brown, play their home games at Stopher Gymnasium in Thibodaux, Louisiana as members of the Southland Conference.

== Previous season ==
The Colonels finished the 2025–26 season 14–19, 12–10 in Southland play, to finish in a tie for fifth place. As the #6 seed in the Southland tournament, they defeated #7 seed Northwestern State in the first round, before falling to #3 seed UT Rio Grande Valley in the quarterfinals.

Following the season, on June 25, 2026, it was announced that head coach Tevon Saddler would be leaving the program, after just three years, in order to take the head coaching position for the Capital City Go-Go, the NBA G League affiliate of the Washington Wizards. Just a few days later, on June 30, the school announced that they would be hiring Texas A&M–Texarkana head coach Darion Brown as the team's next head coach.

== Preseason ==
On October 20, 2026, the Southland Conference released their preseason poll. Nicholls was picked to finish in tenth place.

=== Preseason rankings ===
Southland Preseason Poll
Place	Team	Votes
1	McNeese	121 (11)
2	Stephen F. Austin	109
3	Texas A&M–Corpus Christi	98 (1)
4	Lamar	91
5	UT Rio Grande Valley	78
6	LSU New Orleans	68
7	Houston Christian	47
8	Northwestern State	45
9	Southeastern Louisiana	38
10	Nicholls	37
11	Incarnate Word	36
12	East Texas A&M	24
(#) first-place votes

== Roster ==
2026–27 Nicholls Colonels men's basketball team
Players
Coaches

Pos.	#	Name	Height	Weight	Year	Previous school	Hometown
F	0	Mor Mboup	6 ft 8 in (2.03 m)	255 lb (116 kg)	Jr	Frank Phillips College	Dakar, Senegal
F	1	AJ Dent	6 ft 5 in (1.96 m)	205 lb (93 kg)	Sr	Tarleton State	Thomasville, Georgia
G	2	Christian Winborne	6 ft 3 in (1.91 m)	185 lb (84 kg)	Sr	Iona	Baltimore, Maryland
G	4	Jah-Mel Bruce	6 ft 3 in (1.91 m)	185 lb (84 kg)	So	Tompkins Cortland Community College	Atlanta, Georgia
G	5	Sheridan Sharp	6 ft 3 in (1.91 m)	175 lb (79 kg)	Sr	Southern Indiana	Indianapolis, Indiana
G	6	Cameron Simpson	6 ft 7 in (2.01 m)	180 lb (82 kg)	Jr	Texas State	Orlando, Florida
G	7	Hunter Carter	6 ft 6 in (1.98 m)	190 lb (86 kg)	So	Hawaiʻi	Tacoma, Washington
F	9	Jared Taylor	6 ft 9 in (2.06 m)	260 lb (118 kg)	Jr	Caldwell CC&TI	Charlotte, North Carolina
G	13	AJ McPeters	6 ft 4 in (1.93 m)	210 lb (95 kg)	So	Texas A&M–Texarkana	Irving, Texas
G	15	Cheikh Biteye	6 ft 6 in (1.98 m)	175 lb (79 kg)	Fr	Bella Vista Prep	Dakar, Senegal
G	21	Jordan Matthews	6 ft 3 in (1.91 m)	170 lb (77 kg)	So	Vandebilt Catholic High School	Houma, Louisiana
F	24	Arop Arop	6 ft 11 in (2.11 m)	180 lb (82 kg)	Sr	Memphis	Dallas, Texas
G	44	Doyel Cockrill III	6 ft 2 in (1.88 m)	195 lb (88 kg)	Sr	Chicago State	Nashville, Tennessee
F	52	Junior Sileu	6 ft 10 in (2.08 m)	220 lb (100 kg)	Jr	Western Michigan	Douala, Cameroon

Head coach

- Darion Brown (Our Lady of the Lake)

Assistant coach(es)

- Jeremiah Bozeman (Auburn Montgomery)
- Ty Windy (Western Michigan)
- Jayden Saddler (Southern)
- Tyrease Terrell (Hawaii Pacific)
- Jahmal Manning (Texas–San Antonio)

Legend

- (C) Team captain
- (S) Suspended
- (I) Ineligible
- (W) Walk-on
- Injured
- Current redshirt

Roster
Last update: November 12, 2026

== Schedule and results ==
Date time, TV	Rank^{#}	Opponent^{#}	Result	Record	High points	High rebounds	High assists	Site (attendance) city, state
Regular season
November 2, 2026*; 11:00 am, ESPN+		North American	W 110–56	1–0	14 – Sharp	10 – Arop	6 – Sharp	Stopher Gymnasium (1,103); Thibodaux, LA
November 6, 2026*; 6:30 pm, ESPN+		at UAB	L 63–70	1–1	14 – Dent	8 – Carter	7 – Sharp	Bartow Arena (3,419); Birmingham, AL
November 10, 2026*; 6:30 pm, ESPN+		at Tulane	L 63–77	1–2	16 – Dent	7 – Dent	4 – Sharp	Devlin Fieldhouse (956); New Orleans, LA
November 14, 2026*; 7:00 pm, ESPN+		Louisiana Tech						Stopher Gymnasium; Thibodaux, LA
November 17, 2026*; 7:30 pm, SECN+		at Ole Miss						SJB Pavilion; University, MS
November 21, 2026*; 4:00 pm		vs. Southern Miss; Pensacola Invitational						Pensacola Bay Center; Pensacola, FL
November 22, 2026*; 2:00 pm		vs. Troy; Pensacola Invitational						Pensacola Bay Center; Pensacola, FL
November 29, 2026*; 4:00 pm		at Texas State						Strahan Arena; San Marcos, TX
December 3, 2026; 7:00 pm, ESPN+		UT Rio Grande Valley						Stopher Gymnasium; Thibodaux, LA
December 5, 2026; 3:00 pm, ESPN+		Texas A&M–Corpus Christi						Stopher Gymnasium; Thibodaux, LA
December 10, 2026*; 7:00 pm, ESPN+		at Rice						Tudor Fieldhouse; Houston, TX
December 17, 2026; 7:30 pm, ESPN+		at Houston Christian						Sharp Gymnasium; Houston, TX
December 19, 2026; 4:00 pm, ESPN+		at Incarnate Word						McDermott Center; San Antonio, TX
December 29, 2026*; 5:30 pm, ESPN+		Biblical Studies						Stopher Gymnasium; Thibodaux, LA
January 2, 2027; 5:00 pm, ESPN+		at East Texas A&M						The Field House; Commerce, TX
January 4, 2027; 6:30 pm, ESPN+		Northwestern State						Stopher Gymnasium; Thibodaux, LA
January 9, 2027; 5:00 pm, ESPN+		at LSU New Orleans						Lakefront Arena; New Orleans, LA
January 11, 2027; 6:30 pm, ESPN+		McNeese						Stopher Gymnasium; Thibodaux, LA
January 16, 2027; 6:00 pm, ESPN+		at Lamar						Neches Arena; Beaumont, TX
January 18, 2027; 6:30 pm, ESPN+		at Stephen F. Austin						William R. Johnson Coliseum; Nacogdoches, TX
January 23, 2027; 3:30 pm, ESPN+		at Northwestern State						Prather Coliseum; Natchitoches, LA
January 25, 2027; 6:30 pm, ESPN+		East Texas A&M						Stopher Gymnasium; Thibodaux, LA
January 30, 2027; 3:00 pm, ESPN+		LSU New Orleans						Stopher Gymnasium; Thibodaux, LA
February 1, 2027; 6:00 pm, ESPN+		at Southeastern Louisiana						Pride Roofing University Center; Hammond, LA
February 6, 2027; 3:30 pm, ESPN+		at Texas A&M–Corpus Christi						Hilliard Center; Corpus Christi, TX
February 8, 2027; 3:30 pm, ESPN+		at UT Rio Grande Valley						UTRGV Fieldhouse; Edinburg, TX
February 13, 2027; 3:00 pm, ESPN+		Incarnate Word						Stopher Gymnasium; Thibodaux, LA
February 15, 2027; 6:30 pm, ESPN+		Houston Christian						Stopher Gymnasium; Thibodaux, LA
February 19, 2027; 8:00 pm, CBSSN		Stephen F. Austin						Stopher Gymnasium; Thibodaux, LA
February 22, 2027; 6:30 pm, ESPN+		Lamar						Stopher Gymnasium; Thibodaux, LA
February 27, 2027; 4:00 pm, ESPN+		at McNeese						Townsley Law Arena; Lake Charles, LA
March 1, 2027; 6:30 pm, ESPN+		Southeastern Louisiana						Stopher Gymnasium; Thibodaux, LA
Southland tournament
March 7–10, 2027; ESPN+		vs.						Townsley Law Arena; Lake Charles, LA
*Non-conference game. ^{#}Rankings from AP poll. (#) Tournament seedings in parentheses. All times are in Central.
