= 2026–27 UT Rio Grande Valley Vaqueros men's basketball team =

American college basketball season

2026–27 UT Rio Grande Valley Vaqueros men's basketball
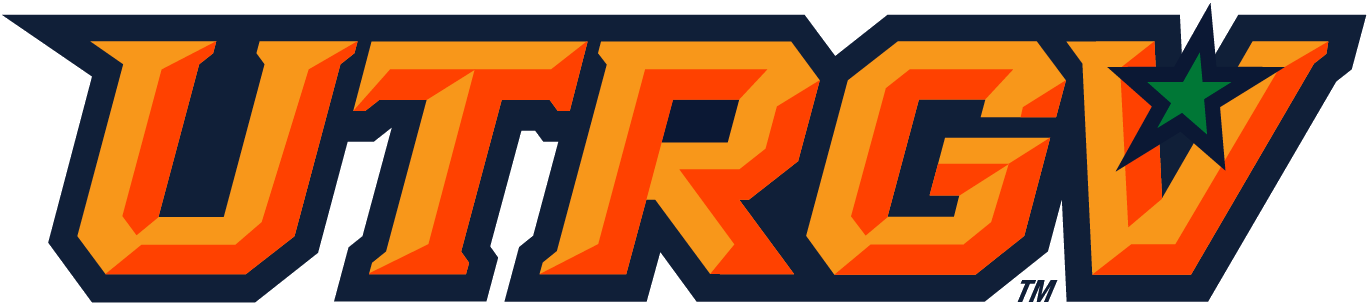
- Conference: Southland Conference
- Record: 2–2 (0–0 Southland)
- Head coach: Brandon Chambers (1st season)
- Associate head coach: Shawn Forrest
- Assistant coaches: Joey Rodriguez; Joseph Anderson; Mitch Marquis
- Home arena: UTRGV Fieldhouse

2026–27 Southland Conference men's basketball standings
	Conf.				Overall
Team	W		L	PCT	W		L	PCT
Houston Christian	0	–	0	–	4	–	0	1.000
Stephen F. Austin	0	–	0	–	3	–	1	.750
East Texas A&M	0	–	0	–	3	–	1	.750
Lamar	0	–	0	–	2	–	1	.667
LSU New Orleans	0	–	0	–	2	–	1	.667
McNeese	0	–	0	–	2	–	1	.667
UT Rio Grande Valley	0	–	0	–	2	–	2	.500
Texas A&M–Corpus Christi	0	–	0	–	2	–	2	.500
Nicholls	0	–	0	–	2	–	2	.500
Southeastern Louisiana	0	–	0	–	1	–	2	.333
Northwestern State	0	–	0	–	1	–	4	.200
Incarnate Word	0	–	0	–	0	–	4	.000
† 2027 Southland tournament winner As of November 16, 2026; Rankings from AP poll

The 2026–27 UT Rio Grande Valley Vaqueros men's basketball team represents the University of Texas Rio Grande Valley during the 2026–27 NCAA Division I men's basketball season. The Vaqueros, led by first-year head coach Brandon Chambers, play their home games at UTRGV Fieldhouse in Edinburg, Texas as members of the Southland Conference.

== Previous season ==
The Vaqueros finished the 2025–26 season 19–14, 14–8 in Southland play, to finish in third place. As the #3 seed in the Southland tournament, they defeated #6 seed Nicholls in the quarterfinals, before falling to #2 seed and eventual tournament champions McNeese in the semifinals.

Following the season, on March 21, 2026, it was announced that head coach Kahil Fennell would be leaving the program, after only two seasons, in order to take the head coaching position at Western Michigan. On April 3, it was announced that the school would be hiring NC State assistant coach Brandon Chambers as the team's new head coach.

== Preseason ==
On October 20, 2026, the Southland Conference released their preseason poll. UT Rio Grande Valley was picked to finish in fifth place.

=== Preseason rankings ===
Southland Preseason Poll
Place	Team	Votes
1	McNeese	121 (11)
2	Stephen F. Austin	109
3	Texas A&M–Corpus Christi	98 (1)
4	Lamar	91
5	UT Rio Grande Valley	78
6	LSU New Orleans	68
7	Houston Christian	47
8	Northwestern State	45
9	Southeastern Louisiana	38
10	Nicholls	37
11	Incarnate Word	36
12	East Texas A&M	24
(#) first-place votes

== Roster ==
2026–27 UT Rio Grande Valley Vaqueros men's basketball team
Players
Coaches

Pos.	#	Name	Height	Weight	Year	Previous school	Hometown
G	0	T'Johnn Brown	6 ft 0 in (1.83 m)	164 lb (74 kg)	RS Jr	McNeese	Dallas, Texas
G	1	Always Wright	6 ft 3 in (1.91 m)	178 lb (81 kg)	RS Sr	Rhode Island	Durango, Mexico
G	2	Darius Carr	6 ft 4 in (1.93 m)	195 lb (88 kg)	RS Jr	Midland College	Los Angeles, California
G	3	Chris Uwayo	6 ft 1 in (1.85 m)	170 lb (77 kg)	Jr	Tyler Junior College	Raleigh, North Carolina
G	4	Jaeson Blair	6 ft 0 in (1.83 m)	—	Sr	Nelson	Biella, Italy
G	5	Caden Bell	6 ft 1 in (1.85 m)	180 lb (82 kg)	Jr	Tyler Junior College	Durham, North Carolina
G	6	Luis Ramirez	6 ft 2 in (1.88 m)	190 lb (86 kg)	Sr	Los Fresnos High School	Brownsville, Texas
G	7	B.B. Knight	6 ft 6 in (1.98 m)	192 lb (87 kg)	Sr	Lamar	Katy, Texas
G	8	Ian Parham Jr.	6 ft 6 in (1.98 m)	—	Fr	Good Vision Academy	Buford, Georgia
F	10	Terrell Wright	6 ft 10 in (2.08 m)	220 lb (100 kg)	Sr	Newman	Atlanta, Georgia
F	11	Bobby Crawford Jr.	6 ft 8 in (2.03 m)	215 lb (98 kg)	So	Lander	St. Petersburg, Florida
F	20	Josiah Hill	6 ft 10 in (2.08 m)	220 lb (100 kg)	RS Jr	Tyler Junior College	Mansfield, Texas
G	22	Devon Pryor	6 ft 7 in (2.01 m)	190 lb (86 kg)	Sr	Oregon	Houston, Texas
G	23	Jace Posey	6 ft 6 in (1.98 m)	222 lb (101 kg)	RS Jr	TCU	Houston, Texas
F	35	Kaleb Corbitt	6 ft 9 in (2.06 m)	—	Fr	Miami Country Day School	Miramar, Florida

Head coach

- Brandon Chambers (VCU)

Assistant coach(es)

- Shawn Forrest (Arkansas–Pine Bluff)
- Joey Rodriguez (VCU)
- Joseph Anderson (Albany)
- Mitch Marquis (Southern New Hampshire)

Legend

- (C) Team captain
- (S) Suspended
- (I) Ineligible
- (W) Walk-on
- Injured
- Current redshirt

Roster
Last update: November 12, 2026

== Schedule and results ==
Date time, TV	Rank^{#}	Opponent^{#}	Result	Record	High points	High rebounds	High assists	Site (attendance) city, state
Regular season
November 2, 2026*; 7:30 pm, ESPN+		Texas A&M–Kingsville	W 81–51	1–0	14 – Tied	7 – Tied	4 – Tied	UTRGV Fieldhouse (1,382); Edinburg, TX
November 7, 2026*; 4:30 pm, ESPN+		Prairie View A&M	W 68–63	2–0	22 – Posey	9 – Posey	4 – Posey	UTRGV Fieldhouse (1,031); Edinburg, TX
November 10, 2026*; 6:30 pm, ESPN+		Texas State	L 65–72	2–1	15 – Posey	5 – Posey	5 – Pryor	UTRGV Fieldhouse (2,328); Edinburg, TX
November 14, 2026*; 6:00 pm, ESPN+		at UT Arlington						College Park Center; Arlington, TX
November 18, 2026*; 6:30 pm, ESPN+		Biblical Studies						UTRGV Fieldhouse; Edinburg, TX
November 21, 2026*; 2:00 pm, ESPN+		at Austin Peay						F&M Bank Arena; Clarksville, TN
November 28, 2026*; 2:00 pm, MW+		at UNLV						Thomas & Mack Center; Paradise, NV
December 3, 2026; 3:00 pm, ESPN+		at Nicholls						Stopher Gymnasium; Thibodaux, LA
December 6, 2026; 5:00 pm, ESPN+		at LSU New Orleans						Lakefront Arena; New Orleans, LA
December 8, 2026*; 7:00 pm		at Texas State						Strahan Arena; San Marcos, TX
December 15, 2026*; 7:00 pm, ESPN+		at Dayton						UD Arena; Dayton, OH
December 19, 2026; 4:30 pm, ESPN+		Stephen F. Austin						UTRGV Fieldhouse; Edinburg, TX
December 21, 2026; 6:30 pm, ESPN+		Lamar						UTRGV Fieldhouse; Edinburg, TX
December 29, 2026*; 7:00 pm, SECN+		at Arkansas						Bud Walton Arena; Fayetteville, AR
January 2, 2027; 4:30 pm, ESPN+		Texas A&M–Corpus Christi; South Texas Showdown						UTRGV Fieldhouse; Edinburg, TX
January 4, 2027; 6:00 pm, ESPN+		at Incarnate Word						McDermott Center; San Antonio, TX
January 9, 2027; 4:30 pm, ESPN+		East Texas A&M						UTRGV Fieldhouse; Edinburg, TX
January 11, 2027; 6:30 pm, ESPN+		Northwestern State						UTRGV Fieldhouse; Edinburg, TX
January 16, 2027; 4:00 pm, ESPN+		at McNeese						Townsley Law Arena; Lake Charles, LA
January 18, 2027; 6:00 pm, ESPN+		at Southeastern Louisiana						Pride Roofing University Center; Hammond, LA
January 23, 2027; 3:30 pm, ESPN+		at Houston Christian						Sharp Gymnasium; Houston, TX
January 26, 2027; 6:30 pm, ESPN+		Incarnate Word						UTRGV Fieldhouse; Edinburg, TX
January 30, 2027; 4:30 pm, ESPN+		Houston Christian						UTRGV Fieldhouse; Edinburg, TX
February 1, 2027; 7:00 pm, ESPN+		at Texas A&M–Corpus Christi; South Texas Showdown						Hilliard Center; Corpus Christi, TX
February 6, 2027; 4:30 pm, ESPN+		LSU New Orleans						UTRGV Fieldhouse; Edinburg, TX
February 8, 2027; 6:30 pm, ESPN+		Nicholls						UTRGV Fieldhouse; Edinburg, TX
February 13, 2027; 4:30 pm, ESPN+		at Stephen F. Austin						William R. Johnson Coliseum; Nacogdoches, TX
February 15, 2027; 6:00 pm, ESPN+		at Lamar						Neches Arena; Beaumont, TX
February 20, 2027; 4:30 pm, ESPN+		Southeastern Louisiana						UTRGV Fieldhouse; Edinburg, TX
February 22, 2027; 6:30 pm, ESPN+		McNeese						UTRGV Fieldhouse; Edinburg, TX
February 27, 2027; 5:00 pm, ESPN+		at East Texas A&M						The Field House; Commerce, TX
March 1, 2027; 8:00 pm, ESPN+		at Northwestern State						Prather Coliseum; Natchitoches, LA
Southland tournament
March 7–10, 2027; ESPN+		vs.						Townsley Law Arena; Lake Charles, LA
*Non-conference game. ^{#}Rankings from AP poll. (#) Tournament seedings in parentheses. All times are in Central.
