= 2026–27 Houston Christian Huskies men's basketball team =

American college basketball season

2026–27 Houston Christian Huskies men's basketball
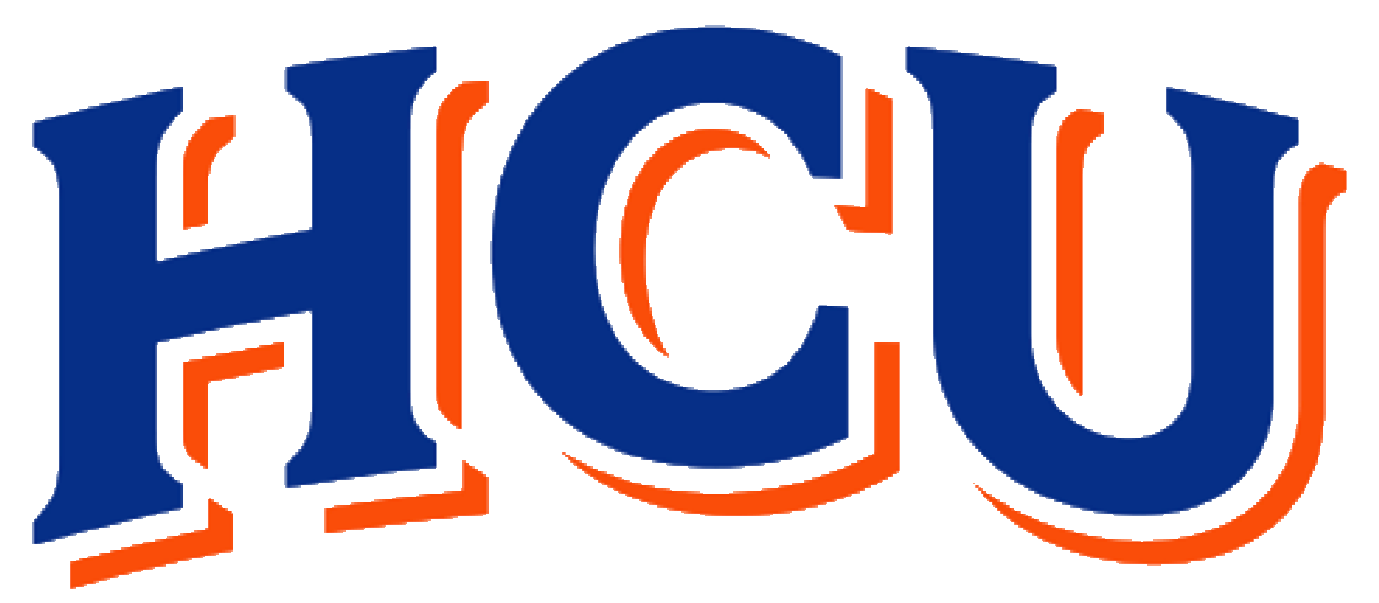
- Conference: Southland Conference
- Record: 3–0 (0–0 Southland)
- Head coach: Craig Doty (3rd season)
- Associate head coach: Evan Lavery
- Assistant coaches: Terry Johnson; Noah Breitenstein; Parker Whiteaker; Tyler Henderson
- Home arena: Sharp Gymnasium

2026–27 Southland Conference men's basketball standings
	Conf.				Overall
Team	W		L	PCT	W		L	PCT
Houston Christian	0	–	0	–	4	–	0	1.000
Stephen F. Austin	0	–	0	–	3	–	1	.750
East Texas A&M	0	–	0	–	3	–	1	.750
Lamar	0	–	0	–	2	–	1	.667
LSU New Orleans	0	–	0	–	2	–	1	.667
McNeese	0	–	0	–	2	–	1	.667
UT Rio Grande Valley	0	–	0	–	2	–	2	.500
Texas A&M–Corpus Christi	0	–	0	–	2	–	2	.500
Nicholls	0	–	0	–	2	–	2	.500
Southeastern Louisiana	0	–	0	–	1	–	2	.333
Northwestern State	0	–	0	–	1	–	4	.200
Incarnate Word	0	–	0	–	0	–	4	.000
† 2027 Southland tournament winner As of November 16, 2026; Rankings from AP poll

The 2026–27 Houston Christian Huskies men's basketball team will represent Houston Christian University during the 2026–27 NCAA Division I men's basketball season. The Huskies, who will be led by third-year head coach Craig Doty, will play their home games at Sharp Gymnasium in Houston, Texas as members of the Southland Conference.

== Previous season ==
The Huskies finished the 2025–26 season 12–20, 8–14 in Southland play, to finish in a tie for seventh place. As the #8 seed in the Southland tournament, they were defeated by #5 seed New Orleans in the first round.

== Preseason ==
On October 20, 2026, the Southland Conference released their preseason poll. Houston Christian was picked to finish seventh in the conference.

=== Preseason rankings ===
Southland Preseason Poll
Place	Team	Votes
1	McNeese	121 (11)
2	Stephen F. Austin	109
3	Texas A&M–Corpus Christi	98 (1)
4	Lamar	91
5	UT Rio Grande Valley	78
6	LSU New Orleans	68
7	Houston Christian	47
8	Northwestern State	45
9	Southeastern Louisiana	38
10	Nicholls	37
11	Incarnate Word	36
12	East Texas A&M	24
(#) first-place votes

== Roster ==
2026–27 Houston Christian Huskies men's basketball team
Players
Coaches

Pos.	#	Name	Height	Weight	Year	Previous school	Hometown
G	0	Jonas Nichols	6 ft 3 in (1.91 m)	217 lb (98 kg)	Jr	Northwest Florida State College	Akron, Ohio
PG	1	Max Alexander (5th)	6 ft 0 in (1.83 m)	193 lb (88 kg)	Sr	Northwestern Oklahoma State	McPherson, Kansas
G	2	Kam Clark	6 ft 6 in (1.98 m)	191 lb (87 kg)	Sr	Queens	Memphis, Tennessee
G	3	D'Aundre Samuels	6 ft 3 in (1.91 m)	181 lb (82 kg)	Sr	Nebraska–Kearney	Denver, Colorado
F	7	Ibrahima Sacko	6 ft 6 in (1.98 m)	248 lb (112 kg)	Sr	New Mexico Highlands	Conakry, Guinea
F	8	Kris Keinys	6 ft 8 in (2.03 m)	217 lb (98 kg)	Sr	Pacific	Klaipėda, Lithuania
G	11	Chris Mubiru	6 ft 4 in (1.93 m)	213 lb (97 kg)	Sr	Northwestern State	Philadelphia, Pennsylvania
G	12	Bubz Alvarez	6 ft 5 in (1.96 m)	193 lb (88 kg)	Sr	South Dakota State	Houston, Texas
F	13	Shawn Simmons II	6 ft 6 in (1.98 m)	205 lb (93 kg)	Sr	UMass Lowell	Philadelphia, Pennsylvania
F	21	Mambourou Mara	6 ft 6 in (1.98 m)	217 lb (98 kg)	Sr	North Dakota	Conakry, Guinea
F	23	Aiden Miller	6 ft 6 in (1.98 m)	219 lb (99 kg)	Jr	IU Indy	Austin, Texas
G	24	Esyah Pippa-White	6 ft 1 in (1.85 m)	171 lb (78 kg)	Sr	Milwaukee	Portland, Oregon
PG	30	King Anderson	5 ft 10 in (1.78 m)	185 lb (84 kg)	Fr	IMG Academy	Houston, Texas
PG	33	Malone Gros	6 ft 4 in (1.93 m)	195 lb (88 kg)	Fr	Hoosac School	Le Taillan-Médoc, France
F	34	Jordan Pape	6 ft 5 in (1.96 m)	202 lb (92 kg)	So	William Penn	Houston, Texas

Head coach

- Craig Doty (Morningside)

Assistant coach(es)

- Evan Lavery (Central Methodist)
- Terry Johnson (Stanislaus State)
- Noah Breitenstein (Coastal Carolina)
- Parker Whiteaker (Mississippi)
- Tyler Henderson (Houston)

Legend

- (C) Team captain
- (S) Suspended
- (I) Ineligible
- (W) Walk-on
- (5th) Fifth-year senior
- Injured
- Current redshirt

Roster
Last update: October 27, 2026

== Schedule and results ==
Date time, TV	Rank^{#}	Opponent^{#}	Result	Record	High points	High rebounds	High assists	Site (attendance) city, state
Exhibition
October 16, 2026*; 6:00 pm		Texas A&M–Kingsville	L 67–74	–	16 – Mara	6 – Tied	5 – Alexander	Sharp Gymnasium (647); Houston, TX
October 24, 2026*; 4:15 pm		at Tarleton State	L 61–71	–	15 – Keinys	10 – Keinys	5 – Mubiru	EECU Center (409); Stephenville, TX
October 28, 2026*; 6:00 pm		Southern Miss	W 101–72	–	23 – Samuels	8 – Mara	5 – Tied	Sharp Gymnasium (524); Houston, TX
Regular season
November 3, 2026*; 7:00 pm, ESPN+		Louisiana Christian	W 108–45	1–0	19 – Alexander	10 – Mara	5 – Alexander	Sharp Gymnasium (597); Houston, TX
November 7, 2026*; 6:00 pm, ESPN+		vs. Western Illinois	W 74–67	2–0	16 – Alvarez	8 – Alvarez	5 – Pippa–White	SRC Multi-Purpose Building (525); Canton, IL
November 10, 2026*; 7:00 pm		at South Dakota	W 87–76	3–0	26 – Alexander	10 – Mara	4 – Alexander	Sanford Coyote Sports Center (1,334); Vermillion, SD
November 13, 2026*; 7:00 pm		Biblical Studies–Houston	W 108-73	4–0	–	–	–	Sharp Gymnasium (486); Houston, TX
November 19, 2026*; 7:00 pm		Georgia Southern						Sharp Gymnasium; Houston, TX
November 24, 2026*; 6:30 pm		at Louisiana–Monroe						b1Bank Fant Coliseum; Monroe, LA
November 30, 2026*; 7:00 pm		Western Illinois						Sharp Gymnasium; Houston, TX
December 2, 2026*; 7:00 pm		at Louisiana						Cajundome; Lafayette, LA
December 5, 2026; 4:00 pm		at McNeese						Townsley Law Arena; Lake Charles, LA
December 7, 2026; 6:00 pm		at Southeastern Louisiana						Pride Roofing University Center; Hammond, LA
December 17, 2026; 7:30 pm		Nicholls						Sharp Gymnasium; Houston, TX
December 19, 2026; 3:30 pm		LSU New Orleans						Sharp Gymnasium; Houston, TX
December 22, 2026*; 7:00 pm		at TCU						Schollmaier Arena; Fort Worth, TX
December 29, 2026*; 7:00 pm		at Oklahoma State						Gallagher-Iba Arena; Stillwater, OK
January 2, 2027; 3:30 pm		Incarnate Word						Sharp Gymnasium; Houston, TX
January 4, 2027; 7:00 pm		at Texas A&M–Corpus Christi						Hilliard Center; Corpus Christi, TX
January 9, 2027; 3:30 pm		Stephen F. Austin						Sharp Gymnasium; Houston, TX
January 11, 2027; 7:00 pm		Lamar						Sharp Gymnasium; Houston, TX
January 16, 2027; 5:00 pm		at East Texas A&M						The Field House; Commerce, TX
January 18, 2027; 6:30 pm		at Northwestern State						Prather Coliseum; Natchitoches, LA
January 23, 2027; 3:30 pm		UT Rio Grande Valley						Sharp Gymnasium; Houston, TX
January 26, 2027; 7:00 pm		Texas A&M–Corpus Christi						Sharp Gymnasium; Houston, TX
January 30, 2027; 4:30 pm		at UT Rio Grande Valley						UTRGV Fieldhouse; Edinburg, TX
February 1, 2027; 5:00 pm		at Incarnate Word						McDermott Center; San Antonio, TX
February 6, 2027; 3:30 pm		Southeastern Louisiana						Sharp Gymnasium; Houston, TX
February 8, 2027; 7:00 pm		McNeese						Sharp Gymnasium; Houston, TX
February 13, 2027; 5:00 pm		at LSU New Orleans						Lakefront Arena; New Orleans, LA
February 15, 2027; 6:30 pm		at Nicholls						Stopher Gymnasium; Thibodaux, LA
February 20, 2027; 7:00 pm		Northwestern State						Sharp Gymnasium; Houston, TX
February 22, 2027; 7:00 pm		East Texas A&M						Sharp Gymnasium; Houston, TX
February 27, 2027; 4:30 pm		at Stephen F. Austin						William R. Johnson Coliseum; Nacogdoches, TX
March 1, 2027; 6:00 pm		at Lamar						Neches Arena; Beaumont, TX
Southland Conference tournament
March 7–10, 2027		vs.						Townsley Law Arena; Lake Charles, LA
*Non-conference game. ^{#}Rankings from AP poll. (#) Tournament seedings in parentheses. All times are in Central.
