= 2026–27 McNeese Cowboys basketball team =

American college basketball season

2026–27 McNeese Cowboys basketball
- Conference: Southland Conference
- Record: 2–1 (0–0 Southland)
- Head coach: Bill Armstrong (2nd season)
- Assistant coaches: Robi Coker; LeBrent Walker; Jeffery Armstrong; Peyton Prudhomme; Nick Williams Jonah Williams
- Home arena: Townsley Law Arena

2026–27 Southland Conference men's basketball standings
	Conf.				Overall
Team	W		L	PCT	W		L	PCT
Houston Christian	0	–	0	–	3	–	0	1.000
Stephen F. Austin	0	–	0	–	3	–	0	1.000
East Texas A&M	0	–	0	–	2	–	1	.667
Lamar	0	–	0	–	2	–	1	.667
McNeese	0	–	0	–	2	–	1	.667
Texas A&M–Corpus Christi	0	–	0	–	2	–	1	.667
UT Rio Grande Valley	0	–	0	–	2	–	1	.667
LSU New Orleans	0	–	0	–	1	–	1	.500
Nicholls	0	–	0	–	1	–	2	.333
Southeastern Louisiana	0	–	0	–	1	–	2	.333
Northwestern State	0	–	0	–	1	–	3	.250
Incarnate Word	0	–	0	–	0	–	4	.000
† 2027 Southland tournament winner As of November 12, 2026; Rankings from AP poll

The 2026–27 McNeese Cowboys basketball team represents McNeese State University during the 2026–27 NCAA Division I men's basketball season. The Cowboys, led by second-year head coach Bill Armstrong, play their home games at Townsley Law Arena in Lake Charles, Louisiana as members of the Southland Conference.

== Previous season ==
The Cowboys finished the 2025–26 season 28–6, 19–3 in Southland play, to finish in second place. As the #2 seed in the Southland tournament, they defeated #3 seed UT Rio Grande Valley in the semifinals, and top seeded Stephen F. Austin to win the Southland Conference championship, sending the Cowboys to their third straight NCAA tournament. In the NCAA tournament, the Cowboys received the #12 seed in the South Region, where they would be defeated by #5 region seed Vanderbilt in the first round.

== Preseason ==
On October 20, 2026, the Southland Conference released their preseason poll. McNeese was picked to finish as Southland Conference champions, receiving 11 out of a possible 12 first-place votes.

=== Preseason rankings ===
Southland Preseason Poll
Place	Team	Votes
1	McNeese	121 (11)
2	Stephen F. Austin	109
3	Texas A&M–Corpus Christi	98 (1)
4	Lamar	91
5	UT Rio Grande Valley	78
6	LSU New Orleans	68
7	Houston Christian	47
8	Northwestern State	45
9	Southeastern Louisiana	38
10	Nicholls	37
11	Incarnate Word	36
12	East Texas A&M	24
(#) first-place votes

== Roster ==
2026–27 McNeese Cowboys men's basketball team
Players
Coaches

Pos.	#	Name	Height	Weight	Year	Previous school	Hometown
G	0	Nicholas DeVall	5 ft 11 in (1.8 m)	170 lb (77 kg)	Fr	St. Louis Catholic High School	Lake Charles, Louisiana
G	1	Dellquan Warren	6 ft 2 in (1.88 m)	185 lb (84 kg)	Jr	Mississippi State	Erie, Pennsylvania
G	2	JJ Rembert	5 ft 10 in (1.78 m)	155 lb (70 kg)	So	Cincinnati	Queens, New York
F	3	MJ Madison	6 ft 9 in (2.06 m)	215 lb (98 kg)	Fr	Prolific Prep	Atlanta, Georgia
G	5	Carl Cherenfant	6 ft 5 in (1.96 m)	195 lb (88 kg)	Sr	New Mexico State	Pompano Beach, Florida
G	6	Larry Johnson	6 ft 4 in (1.93 m)	200 lb (91 kg)	So	Creighton	Savannah, Georgia
F	7	Christian Nitu	6 ft 11 in (2.11 m)	220 lb (100 kg)	So	Washington	Whitby, Ontario
G	10	Joe DeVall	5 ft 11 in (1.8 m)	170 lb (77 kg)	Fr	St. Louis Catholic High School	Lake Charles, Louisiana
F	11	Corey Chest	6 ft 8 in (2.03 m)	220 lb (100 kg)	Jr	Ole Miss	New Orleans, Louisiana
G	12	Jaylon Dean-Vines	6 ft 4 in (1.93 m)	182 lb (83 kg)	So	Vanderbilt	Dallas, Texas
G	14	Erik Villarreal	6 ft 3 in (1.91 m)	190 lb (86 kg)	So	Clear Lake High School	Houston, Texas
F	21	Alier Maluk	6 ft 11 in (2.11 m)	220 lb (100 kg)	Jr	Florida State	Baldwin, Pennsylvania
F	23	Jerrell Colbert (5th)	6 ft 10 in (2.08 m)	235 lb (107 kg)	Sr	SMU	Houston, Texas
G	24	Tyrease Hunter	6 ft 2 in (1.88 m)	170 lb (77 kg)	Fr	Roselle Catholic High School	Hopewell, Virginia
F	27	Akim Mazou	6 ft 10 in (2.08 m)	190 lb (86 kg)	Fr	Thurgood Marshall Academy	Bronx, New York
G	81	Elijah "Choppa" Moore	6 ft 4 in (1.93 m)	180 lb (82 kg)	So	Utah	Bronx, New York

Head coach

- Bill Armstrong (UAB)

Assistant coach(es)

- Robi Coker (Jacksonville State)
- LeBrent Walker (Florida A&M)
- Jeffery Armstrong (Southern Miss)
- Peyton Prudhomme (Texas Wesleyan)
- Nick Williams (Mississippi)
- Jonah Williams (Alabama–Huntsville)

Legend

- (C) Team captain
- (S) Suspended
- (I) Ineligible
- (W) Walk-on
- (5th) Fifth-year senior
- Injured
- Current redshirt

Roster
Last update: November 3, 2026

== Schedule and results ==
Date time, TV	Rank^{#}	Opponent^{#}	Result	Record	High points	High rebounds	High assists	Site (attendance) city, state
Exhibition
October 8, 2026*; 6:30 pm		LSU	L 60–63	–	22 – Johnson	5 – Johnson	2 – Johnson	Townsley Law Arena (4,424); Lake Charles, LA
October 25, 2026*; 2:00 pm		Southern	W 90–76	–	30 – Johnson	10 – Maluk	6 – Warren	Townsley Law Arena; Lake Charles, LA
Regular season
November 2, 2026*; 4:30 pm, YouTube		vs. UAB; Field of 68 Opening Day Marathon	W 99–78	1–0	31 – Johnson	6 – Nitu	9 – Warren	Rock Hill Sports & Event Center (452); Rock Hill, SC
November 5, 2026*; 4:00 pm, ESPN+		at North Texas	L 67–77	1–1	20 – Dean-Vines	7 – Tied	4 – Warren	The Super Pit (2,689); Denton, TX
November 9, 2026*; 6:30 pm, ESPN+		Biblical Studies	W 135–87	2–1	29 – Moore	11 – Maluk	12 – Warren	Townsley Law Arena (3,138); Lake Charles, LA
November 22, 2026*; 2:30 pm, The CW		at Texas State						Strahan Arena; San Marcos, TX
November 28, 2026*; 3:00 pm, ESPN+		at Louisiana						Cajundome; Lafayette, LA
November 30, 2026*; 6:30 pm, ESPN+		Champion Christian						Townsley Law Arena; Lake Charles, LA
December 5, 2026; 4:00 pm, ESPN+		Houston Christian						Townsley Law Arena; Lake Charles, LA
December 7, 2026; 6:30 pm, ESPN+		Incarnate Word						Townsley Law Arena; Lake Charles, LA
December 10, 2026*; 6:30 pm, ESPN+		Southern Miss						Townsley Law Arena; Lake Charles, LA
December 13, 2026*; 6:00 pm		vs. Loyola Marymount; Jack Jones Classic						Lee's Family Forum; Henderson, NV
December 14, 2026*; 8:00 pm		vs. Santa Clara; Jack Jones Classic						Lee's Family Forum; Henderson, NV
December 19, 2026; 3:30 pm, ESPN+		at Northwestern State						Prather Coliseum; Natchitoches, LA
December 21, 2026; 6:30 pm, ESPN+		at East Texas A&M						The Field House; Commerce, TX
January 2, 2027; 4:00 pm, ESPN+		Lamar; Battle of the Border						Townsley Law Arena; Lake Charles, LA
January 4, 2027; 6:30 pm, ESPN+		Stephen F. Austin						Townsley Law Arena; Lake Charles, LA
January 9, 2027; 3:30 pm, ESPN+		at Southeastern Louisiana						Pride Roofing University Center; Hammond, LA
January 11, 2027; 6:30 pm, ESPN+		at Nicholls						Stopher Gymnasium; Thibodaux, LA
January 16, 2027; 4:00 pm, ESPN+		UT Rio Grande Valley						Townsley Law Arena; Lake Charles, LA
January 18, 2027; 6:30 pm, ESPN+		Texas A&M–Corpus Christi						Townsley Law Arena; Lake Charles, LA
January 23, 2027; 4:30 pm, ESPN+		at Stephen F. Austin						William R. Johnson Coliseum; Nacogdoches, TX
January 26, 2027; 6:00 pm, ESPN+		at Lamar; Battle of the Border						Neches Arena; Beaumont, TX
January 30, 2027; 4:00 pm, ESPN+		Southeastern Louisiana						Townsley Law Arena; Lake Charles, LA
February 1, 2027; 6:30 pm, ESPN+		at LSU New Orleans						Lakefront Arena; New Orleans, LA
February 6, 2027; 4:00 pm, ESPN+		at Incarnate Word						McDermott Center; San Antonio, TX
February 8, 2027; 7:00 pm, ESPN+		at Houston Christian						Sharp Gymnasium; Houston, TX
February 13, 2027; 4:00 pm, ESPN+		East Texas A&M						Townsley Law Arena; Lake Charles, LA
February 15, 2027; 6:30 pm, ESPN+		Northwestern State						Townsley Law Arena; Lake Charles, LA
February 20, 2027; 5:30 pm, ESPN+		at Texas A&M–Corpus Christi						Hilliard Center; Corpus Christi, TX
February 22, 2027; 6:30 pm, ESPN+		at UT Rio Grande Valley						UTRGV Fieldhouse; Edinburg, TX
February 27, 2027; 4:00 pm, ESPN+		Nicholls						Townsley Law Arena; Lake Charles, LA
March 1, 2027; 6:30 pm, ESPN+		LSU New Orleans						Townsley Law Arena; Lake Charles, LA
Southland Conference tournament
March 7–10, 2027; ESPN+								Townsley Law Arena; Lake Charles, LA
*Non-conference game. ^{#}Rankings from AP poll. (#) Tournament seedings in parentheses. All times are in Central.
