= 2026–27 Texas A&M–Corpus Christi Islanders men's basketball team =

American college basketball season

2026–27 Texas A&M–Corpus Christi Islanders men's basketball
- Conference: Southland Conference
- Record: 2–1 (0–0 Southland)
- Head coach: Jim Shaw (4th season)
- Assistant coaches: Ralph Davis; Terrence Rencher; Dylan Johnson; Johnathan Bell; Robert Edwards
- Home arena: Hilliard Center; Dugan Wellness Center

2026–27 Southland Conference men's basketball standings
	Conf.				Overall
Team	W		L	PCT	W		L	PCT
Houston Christian	0	–	0	–	3	–	0	1.000
East Texas A&M	0	–	0	–	2	–	0	1.000
Stephen F. Austin	0	–	0	–	2	–	0	1.000
McNeese	0	–	0	–	2	–	1	.667
Texas A&M–Corpus Christi	0	–	0	–	2	–	1	.667
UT Rio Grande Valley	0	–	0	–	2	–	1	.667
Lamar	0	–	0	–	1	–	1	.500
LSU New Orleans	0	–	0	–	1	–	1	.500
Nicholls	0	–	0	–	1	–	2	.333
Southeastern Louisiana	0	–	0	–	1	–	2	.333
Northwestern State	0	–	0	–	1	–	3	.250
Incarnate Word	0	–	0	–	0	–	3	.000
† 2027 Southland tournament winner As of November 12, 2026; Rankings from AP poll

The 2026–27 Texas A&M–Corpus Christi Islanders men's basketball team represents Texas A&M University–Corpus Christi during the 2026–27 NCAA Division I men's basketball season. The Islanders, led by fourth-year head coach Jim Shaw, will play their two non-conference home games at the Dugan Wellness Center, while playing their conference home games at the Hilliard Center, both located in Corpus Christi, Texas, as members of the Southland Conference.

== Previous season ==
The Islanders finished the 2025–26 season 18–15, 13–9 in Southland play, to finish in fourth place. As the #4 seed in the Southland tournament, they defeated #5 seed New Orleans in the quarterfinals, before falling to top seeded Stephen F. Austin in the semifinals.

== Preseason ==
On October 20, 2026, the Southland Conference released their preseason poll. Texas A&M–Corpus Christi was picked to finish in third place, receiving 1 out of a possible 12 first-place votes.

=== Preseason rankings ===
Southland Preseason Poll
Place	Team	Votes
1	McNeese	121 (11)
2	Stephen F. Austin	109
3	Texas A&M–Corpus Christi	98 (1)
4	Lamar	91
5	UT Rio Grande Valley	78
6	LSU New Orleans	68
7	Houston Christian	47
8	Northwestern State	45
9	Southeastern Louisiana	38
10	Nicholls	37
11	Incarnate Word	36
12	East Texas A&M	24
(#) first-place votes

== Roster ==
2026–27 Texas A&M–Corpus Christi Islanders men's basketball team
Players
Coaches

Pos.	#	Name	Height	Weight	Year	Previous school	Hometown
G	0	Jordan Mizell	6 ft 1 in (1.85 m)	185 lb (84 kg)	Jr	Tarleton State	Plano, Texas
G	1	Sebastian Robinson	6 ft 3 in (1.91 m)	210 lb (95 kg)	Sr	NJIT	Montclair, New Jersey
G	2	Damarion Winston	6 ft 2 in (1.88 m)	180 lb (82 kg)	Jr	Itawamba Community College	Yazoo City, Mississippi
F	3	Dan Mukuna	6 ft 8 in (2.03 m)	220 lb (100 kg)	GS	Fort Hays State	Dortmund, Germany
G	4	Bryson Wheatfall	6 ft 5 in (1.96 m)	205 lb (93 kg)	So	Legacy Early College	Humble, Texas
G	5	Beau Billingsley	6 ft 2 in (1.88 m)	195 lb (88 kg)	Fr	Norman High School	Norman, Oklahoma
F	7	Khi Wallace	6 ft 5 in (1.96 m)	215 lb (98 kg)	Sr	LSU–Shreveport	Nashville, Tennessee
G	9	Isaiah Lewis	6 ft 3 in (1.91 m)	175 lb (79 kg)	Sr	Long Beach State	Los Angeles, California
G	10	Daniel Michelini-Jackson	6 ft 5 in (1.96 m)	180 lb (82 kg)	Sr	East Los Angeles College	Inglewood, California
G	11	Jacori Jones	5 ft 10 in (1.78 m)	165 lb (75 kg)	Fr	Braswell High School	Denton, Texas
G/F	12	Desmond Kent Jr.	6 ft 7 in (2.01 m)	190 lb (86 kg)	Jr	Chipola College	Concord, North Carolina
G	14	Cedric Horton	6 ft 5 in (1.96 m)	185 lb (84 kg)	So	Hargrave Military Academy	Richmond, Indiana
F	22	Bin Basil	6 ft 7 in (2.01 m)	240 lb (109 kg)	Jr	Wagner	Ottawa, Ontario
C	23	Lamin Foon	6 ft 11 in (2.11 m)	220 lb (100 kg)	Fr	Anna High School	Anna, Texas
C	24	Jamal Ambrose	6 ft 10 in (2.08 m)	260 lb (118 kg)	GS	Omaha	Apple Valley, Minnesota
F	42	CJ Worsham	6 ft 7 in (2.01 m)	220 lb (100 kg)	Jr	Panola College	Chicago, Illinois

Head coach

- Jim Shaw (Grinnell)

Assistant coach(es)

- Ralph Davis (Texas A&M–Kingsville)
- Terrence Rencher (Texas)
- Dylan Johnson (Michigan)
- Johnathan Bell (Nicholls State)
- Robert Edwards (Nebraska)

Legend

- (C) Team captain
- (S) Suspended
- (I) Ineligible
- (W) Walk-on
- Injured
- Current redshirt

Roster
Last update: November 12, 2026

== Schedule and results ==
Date time, TV	Rank^{#}	Opponent^{#}	Result	Record	High points	High rebounds	High assists	Site (attendance) city, state
Regular season
November 2, 2026*; 7:00 pm, YouTube		at Texas State	L 55–67	0–1	13 – Kent Jr.	4 – Tied	2 – Tied	Strahan Arena (1,553); San Marcos, TX
November 6, 2026*; 7:00 pm, ESPN+		at Louisiana	W 67–60	1–1	14 – Basil	7 – Mukuna	2 – Lewis	Cajundome (2,014); Lafayette, LA
November 10, 2026*; 7:00 pm, ESPN+		Dallas Christian	W 102–58	2–1	18 – Wallace	10 – Basil	6 – Billingsley	Dugan Wellness Center (1,175); Corpus Christi, TX
November 13, 2026*; 4:00 pm, ACCNX		at Florida State						Donald L. Tucker Center; Tallahassee, FL
November 17, 2026*; 7:00 pm, ESPN+		at Rice						Tudor Fieldhouse; Houston, TX
November 21, 2026*; 7:00 pm		at Oral Roberts						Mabee Center; Tulsa, OK
November 23, 2026*; 6:30 pm, ESPN+		at Wichita State						Charles Koch Arena; Wichita, KS
November 30, 2026*; 11:00 am, ESPN+		Southwestern Adventist						Dugan Wellness Center; Corpus Christi, TX
December 5, 2026; 3:00 pm, ESPN+		at Nicholls						Stopher Gymnasium; Thibodaux, LA
December 7, 2026; 6:30 pm, ESPN+		at LSU New Orleans						Lakefront Arena; New Orleans, LA
December 12, 2026*; 1:30 pm, USA		at Boise State						ExtraMile Arena; Boise, ID
December 19, 2026; 3:30 pm, ESPN+		Lamar						Hilliard Center; Corpus Christi, TX
December 21, 2026; 7:00 pm, ESPN+		Stephen F. Austin						Hilliard Center; Corpus Christi, TX
December 29, 2026*; 3:00 pm, ESPN+		at Houston						Fertitta Center; Houston, TX
January 2, 2027; 4:30 pm, ESPN+		at UT Rio Grande Valley; South Texas Showdown						UTRGV Fieldhouse; Edinburg, TX
January 4, 2027; 7:00 pm, ESPN+		Houston Christian						Hilliard Center; Corpus Christi, TX
January 9, 2027; 3:30 pm, ESPN+		Northwestern State						Hilliard Center; Corpus Christi, TX
January 11, 2027; 7:00 pm, ESPN+		East Texas A&M						Hilliard Center; Corpus Christi, TX
January 16, 2027; 3:30 pm, ESPN+		at Southeastern Louisiana						Pride Roofing University Center; Hammond, LA
January 18, 2027; 6:30 pm, ESPN+		at McNeese						Townsley Law Arena; Lake Charles, LA
January 23, 2027; 3:30 pm, ESPN+		Incarnate Word						Hilliard Center; Corpus Christi, TX
January 26, 2027; 7:00 pm, ESPN+		at Houston Christian						Sharp Gymnasium; Houston, TX
January 30, 2027; 4:00 pm, ESPN+		at Incarnate Word						McDermott Center; San Antonio, TX
February 1, 2027; 7:00 pm, ESPN+		UT Rio Grande Valley; South Texas Showdown						Hilliard Center; Corpus Christi, TX
February 6, 2027; 3:30 pm, ESPN+		Nicholls						Hilliard Center; Corpus Christi, TX
February 8, 2027; 7:00 pm, ESPN+		LSU New Orleans						Hilliard Center; Corpus Christi, TX
February 13, 2027; 6:00 pm, ESPN+		at Lamar						Neches Arena; Beaumont, TX
February 15, 2027; 6:30 pm, ESPN+		at Stephen F. Austin						William R. Johnson Coliseum; Nacogdoches, TX
February 20, 2027; 5:30 pm, ESPN+		McNeese						Hilliard Center; Corpus Christi, TX
February 22, 2027; 7:00 pm, ESPN+		Southeastern Louisiana						Hilliard Center; Corpus Christi, TX
February 26, 2027; 8:00 pm, CBSSN		at Northwestern State						Prather Coliseum; Natchitoches, LA
March 1, 2027; 6:30 pm, ESPN+		at East Texas A&M						The Field House; Commerce, TX
Southland tournament
March 7–10, 2027		vs.						Townsley Law Arena; Lake Charles, LA
*Non-conference game. ^{#}Rankings from AP poll. (#) Tournament seedings in parentheses. All times are in Central.
