= 2026–27 East Texas A&M Lions men's basketball team =

American college basketball season

2026–27 East Texas A&M Lions men's basketball
- Conference: Southland Conference
- Record: 3–1 (0–0 Southland)
- Head coach: Jaret von Rosenberg (10th season)
- Associate head coach: Coleman Furst
- Assistant coaches: Clif Carroll; Danijel Mihailovic; Trey Conrod; Sam Reaves
- Home arena: The Field House

2026–27 Southland Conference men's basketball standings
	Conf.				Overall
Team	W		L	PCT	W		L	PCT
Houston Christian	0	–	0	–	4	–	1	.800
Lamar	0	–	0	–	3	–	1	.750
Stephen F. Austin	0	–	0	–	3	–	1	.750
McNeese	0	–	0	–	2	–	1	.667
UT Rio Grande Valley	0	–	0	–	3	–	2	.600
East Texas A&M	0	–	0	–	3	–	3	.500
LSU New Orleans	0	–	0	–	2	–	2	.500
Nicholls	0	–	0	–	2	–	3	.400
Texas A&M–Corpus Christi	0	–	0	–	2	–	3	.400
Southeastern Louisiana	0	–	0	–	1	–	3	.250
Northwestern State	0	–	0	–	1	–	4	.200
Incarnate Word	0	–	0	–	0	–	5	.000
† 2027 Southland tournament winner As of November 20, 2026; Rankings from AP poll

The 2026–27 East Texas A&M Lions men's basketball team represents East Texas A&M University during the 2026–27 NCAA Division I men's basketball season. The Lions, who are led by tenth-year head coach Jaret von Rosenberg, play their home games at The Field House in Commerce, Texas as members of the Southland Conference.

== Previous season ==
The Lions finished the 2025–26 season 11–21, 6–16 in Southland play, to finish in a tie for eleventh (last) place. They failed to qualify for the Southland Conference tournament, as only the top eight teams qualify.

== Preseason ==
On October 20, 2026, the Southland Conference released their preseason poll. East Texas A&M was picked to finish last in the conference.

=== Preseason rankings ===
Southland Preseason Poll
Place	Team	Votes
1	McNeese	121 (11)
2	Stephen F. Austin	109
3	Texas A&M–Corpus Christi	98 (1)
4	Lamar	91
5	UT Rio Grande Valley	78
6	LSU New Orleans	68
7	Houston Christian	47
8	Northwestern State	45
9	Southeastern Louisiana	38
10	Nicholls	37
11	Incarnate Word	36
12	East Texas A&M	24
(#) first-place votes

== Roster ==
2026–27 East Texas A&M Lions men's basketball team
Players
Coaches

Pos.	#	Name	Height	Weight	Year	Previous school	Hometown
G	0	Chris Adlam	6 ft 3 in (1.91 m)	185 lb (84 kg)	So	Houston Christian High School	Cypress, Texas
F	1	Bo Aldridge	6 ft 4 in (1.93 m)	180 lb (82 kg)	Jr	Hutchinson Community College	Topeka, Kansas
G	2	Evan Phelps	6 ft 0 in (1.83 m)	180 lb (82 kg)	Sr	Duncanville High School	Midland, Texas
F	3	Yvain Vidal	7 ft 0 in (2.13 m)	197 lb (89 kg)	Fr	Lycée Henri Bergson	Paris, France
G	4	Gasper Škorjanc	6 ft 2 in (1.88 m)	221 lb (100 kg)	Fr	I. Gimnazija v Celju	Olimje, Slovenia
F	5	Mohamed Diakite	6 ft 9 in (2.06 m)	208 lb (94 kg)	Fr	INSEP	Poitiers, France
F	7	Codrut Dinu	6 ft 3 in (1.91 m)	181 lb (82 kg)	Fr	Colegiul National Mihai Viteazul	Ploiești, Romania
G	8	Alonzo Dodd	6 ft 0 in (1.83 m)	180 lb (82 kg)	Sr	Appalachian State	St. Paul, Minnesota
F	10	Maxime Carrio	6 ft 4 in (1.93 m)	185 lb (84 kg)	Fr	Le Centre Éducatif Nantais pour Sportifs	Nantes, France
G	11	Kamren Robinson	6 ft 0 in (1.83 m)	160 lb (73 kg)	Fr	AZ Compass Prep	Suffolk, Virginia
G	12	Kollin Tolbert	6 ft 0 in (1.83 m)	190 lb (86 kg)	Jr	Concord	Cincinnati, Ohio
F	20	Thomas Duchamp	6 ft 6 in (1.98 m)	195 lb (88 kg)	Fr	Lycée Val de Seine	Le Havre, France
F	21	Amar Hot	6 ft 9 in (2.06 m)	231 lb (105 kg)	Fr	Gimnazija Nikola Karev	Skopje, North Macedonia
F	24	Jaxson Ford	6 ft 7 in (2.01 m)	215 lb (98 kg)	Jr	Sam Houston	Prosper, Texas
F	25	Marko Markovic	7 ft 1 in (2.16 m)	290 lb (132 kg)	Fr	BC Leotar Trebinje	Trebinje, Bosnia and Herzegovina

Head coach

- Jaret von Rosenberg (Hartford)

Assistant coach(es)

- Coleman Furst (Tarleton State)
- Clif Carroll (Texas Tech)
- Danijel Mihailovic (Post)
- Derryk O'Grady (Vermont)
- Trey Conrod (East Texas A&M)
- Sam Reaves (Lubbock Christian)

Legend

- (C) Team captain
- (S) Suspended
- (I) Ineligible
- (W) Walk-on
- Injured
- Current redshirt

Roster
Last update: October 27, 2026

== Schedule and results ==
Date time, TV	Rank^{#}	Opponent^{#}	Result	Record	High points	High rebounds	High assists	Site (attendance) city, state
Regular season
November 2, 2026*; 7:00 pm, SECN+		at Oklahoma	W 68–64	1–0	22 – Aldridge	7 – Diakite	5 – Tied	Lloyd Noble Center (4,647); Norman, OK
November 5, 2026*; 7:00 pm, ESPN+		at Rice	W 72–71	2–0	23 – Diakite	13 – Hot	6 – Dodd	Tudor Fieldhouse (719); Houston, TX
November 11, 2026*; 10:30 am		Fairleigh Dickinson	L 76–80 ^{OT}	2–1	25 – Dodd	8 – Dodd	6 – Aldridge	The Field House (2,184); Commerce, TX
November 13, 2026*; 9:00 pm, ESPN+		at Portland	W 94–88 ^{2OT}	3–1	24 – Diakite	8 – Diakite	5 – Dodd	Chiles Center (1,038); Portland, OR
November 16, 2026*; 8:30 pm		at Oregon State	L 71–109	3–2	23 – Dodd	4 – Škorjanc	3 – Tied	Gill Coliseum (2,426); Corvallis, OR
November 19, 2026*; 9:00 pm, ACCNX		at California	L 54–86	3–3	18 – Diakite	10 – Ford	3 – Dodd	Haas Pavilion (2,433); Berkeley, CA
November 24, 2026*; 6:30 pm		Arlington Baptist						The Field House; Commerce, TX
November 28, 2026*; 3:00 pm		at Marshall						Cam Henderson Center; Huntington, WV
December 5, 2026; 4:30 pm		at Stephen F. Austin						William R. Johnson Coliseum; Nacogdoches, TX
December 7, 2026; 6:00 pm		at Lamar						Neches Arena; Beaumont, TX
December 15, 2026*; 6:30 pm		at Central Arkansas						Farris Center; Conway, AR
December 19, 2026; 5:00 pm		Southeastern Louisiana						The Field House; Commerce, TX
December 21, 2026; 6:30 pm		McNeese						The Field House; Commerce, TX
December 29, 2026*; 7:00 pm		at Texas						Moody Center; Austin, TX
January 2, 2027; 5:00 pm		Nicholls						The Field House; Commerce, TX
January 4, 2027; 6:30 pm		LSU New Orleans						The Field House; Commerce, TX
January 9, 2027; 4:30 pm		at UT Rio Grande Valley						UTRGV Fieldhouse; Edinburg, TX
January 11, 2027; 7:00 pm		at Texas A&M–Corpus Christi						Hilliard Center; Corpus Christi, TX
January 16, 2027; 5:00 pm		Houston Christian						The Field House; Commerce, TX
January 18, 2027; 1:00 pm		Incarnate Word						The Field House; Commerce, TX
January 23, 2027; 5:00 pm		at LSU New Orleans						Lakefront Arena; New Orleans, LA
January 25, 2027; 6:30 pm		at Nicholls						Stopher Gymnasium; Thibodaux, LA
January 30, 2027; 3:30 pm		at Northwestern State						Prather Coliseum; Natchitoches, LA
February 1, 2027; 6:30 pm		Lamar						The Field House; Commerce, TX
February 6, 2027; 5:00 pm		Northwestern State						The Field House; Commerce, TX
February 8, 2027; 6:30 pm		Stephen F. Austin						The Field House; Commerce, TX
February 13, 2027; 4:00 pm		at McNeese						Townsley Law Arena; Lake Charles, LA
February 15, 2027; 6:00 pm		at Southeastern Louisiana						Pride Roofing University Center; Hammond, LA
February 20, 2027; 4:00 pm		at Incarnate Word						McDermott Center; San Antonio, TX
February 22, 2027; 7:00 pm		at Houston Christian						Sharp Gymnasium; Houston, TX
February 27, 2027; 5:00 pm		UT Rio Grande Valley						The Field House; Commerce, TX
March 1, 2027; 6:30 pm		Texas A&M–Corpus Christi						The Field House; Commerce, TX
Southland Conference tournament
March 7–10, 2027		vs.						Townsley Law Arena; Lake Charles, LA
*Non-conference game. ^{#}Rankings from AP poll. (#) Tournament seedings in parentheses. All times are in Central.
