= 2026–27 Stephen F. Austin Lumberjacks basketball team =

American college basketball season

2026–27 Stephen F. Austin Lumberjacks basketball
- Conference: Southland Conference
- Record: 3–0 (0–0 Southland)
- Head coach: Matt Braeuer (2nd season)
- Associate head coach: Jimmy Smith
- Assistant coaches: Jovan Austin; Payne Andrus; Trajan Wesley
- Home arena: William R. Johnson Coliseum

2026–27 Southland Conference men's basketball standings
	Conf.				Overall
Team	W		L	PCT	W		L	PCT
Houston Christian	0	–	0	–	3	–	0	1.000
Stephen F. Austin	0	–	0	–	3	–	0	1.000
East Texas A&M	0	–	0	–	2	–	1	.667
Lamar	0	–	0	–	2	–	1	.667
McNeese	0	–	0	–	2	–	1	.667
Texas A&M–Corpus Christi	0	–	0	–	2	–	1	.667
UT Rio Grande Valley	0	–	0	–	2	–	1	.667
LSU New Orleans	0	–	0	–	1	–	1	.500
Nicholls	0	–	0	–	1	–	2	.333
Southeastern Louisiana	0	–	0	–	1	–	2	.333
Northwestern State	0	–	0	–	1	–	3	.250
Incarnate Word	0	–	0	–	0	–	4	.000
† 2027 Southland tournament winner As of November 12, 2026; Rankings from AP poll

The 2026–27 Stephen F. Austin Lumberjacks basketball team represents Stephen F. Austin State University during the 2026–27 NCAA Division I men's basketball season. The Lumberjacks, led by second-year head coach Matt Braeuer, play their home games at the William R. Johnson Coliseum in Nacogdoches, Texas as members of the Southland Conference.

== Previous season ==
The Lumberjacks finished the 2025–26 season 28–6, 20–2 in Southland play, to finish as Southland regular season champions. As the top seed in the Southland tournament, they defeated #4 seed Texas A&M–Corpus Christi in the semifinals, before falling to #2 seed McNeese in the championship game. They received an automatic bid to the NIT, where they would be defeated by Tulsa in the first round.

== Preseason ==
On October 20, 2026, the Southland Conference released their preseason poll. Stephen F. Austin was picked to finish in second place.

=== Preseason rankings ===
Southland Preseason Poll
Place	Team	Votes
1	McNeese	121 (11)
2	Stephen F. Austin	109
3	Texas A&M–Corpus Christi	98 (1)
4	Lamar	91
5	UT Rio Grande Valley	78
6	LSU New Orleans	68
7	Houston Christian	47
8	Northwestern State	45
9	Southeastern Louisiana	38
10	Nicholls	37
11	Incarnate Word	36
12	East Texas A&M	24
(#) first-place votes

== Roster ==
2026–27 Stephen F. Austin Lumberjacks men's basketball team
Players
Coaches

Pos.	#	Name	Height	Weight	Year	Previous school	Hometown
F	0	Kobi Pearson	6 ft 8 in (2.03 m)	215 lb (98 kg)	So	Texas A&M–Corpus Christi	Lancaster, Texas
G	1	Ashton Simmons	6 ft 3 in (1.91 m)	200 lb (91 kg)	RS So	TCU	Beaumont, Texas
G	2	Bryceson Melvin	6 ft 5 in (1.96 m)	200 lb (91 kg)	So	RWG STEM Academy	Arlington, Texas
G/F	3	Christian Green	6 ft 6 in (1.98 m)	195 lb (88 kg)	Sr	Trinity	San Antonio, Texas
G	4	Marcus Scurry	5 ft 11 in (1.8 m)	170 lb (77 kg)	So	Butler High School	Augusta, Georgia
G	5	Courterius Scott	6 ft 0 in (1.83 m)	190 lb (86 kg)	Jr	Southwest Mississippi Community College	Jackson, Mississippi
G	6	Narit Chotikavanic	6 ft 2 in (1.88 m)	195 lb (88 kg)	Jr	West Texas A&M	Plano, Texas
G	12	Erik Makke	6 ft 2 in (1.88 m)	—	Fr	BC Kalev	Keila, Estonia
F	17	Gediminas Alisas	6 ft 6 in (1.98 m)	235 lb (107 kg)	Jr	Western Wyoming College	Vilnius, Lithuania
G	20	Kensington Candler	6 ft 1 in (1.85 m)	—	Fr	Little Elm High School	Little Elm, Texas
G	21	MJ Russell	6 ft 3 in (1.91 m)	195 lb (88 kg)	RS Sr	Louisiana–Monroe	Coker, Alabama
G	24	Easton Hupp	6 ft 4 in (1.93 m)	200 lb (91 kg)	Fr	Charleston Southern	Fort Worth, Texas
F	32	Edwin Daniel	6 ft 9 in (2.06 m)	215 lb (98 kg)	Sr	La Salle	Washington Heights, New York
F	33	Amari Reed	6 ft 8 in (2.03 m)	210 lb (95 kg)	So	UT Arlington	Lancaster, Texas
G	99	Manu Manciel	6 ft 3 in (1.91 m)	—	Fr	Wasatch Academy	Detroit, Michigan

Head coach

- Matt Braeuer (Wichita State)

Assistant coach(es)

- Jimmy Smith (Mary Hardin–Baylor)
- Jovan Austin (East Texas A&M)
- Payne Andrus (MidAmerica Nazarene)
- Trajan Wesley (Louisiana)

Legend

- (C) Team captain
- (S) Suspended
- (I) Ineligible
- (W) Walk-on
- Injured
- Current redshirt

Roster
Last update: November 11, 2026

== Schedule and results ==
Date time, TV	Rank^{#}	Opponent^{#}	Result	Record	High points	High rebounds	High assists	Site (attendance) city, state
Regular season
November 2, 2026*; 6:30 pm, ESPN+		Lyon	W 120–61	1–0	18 – Chotikavanic	10 – Alisas	5 – Scott	William R. Johnson Coliseum (923); Nacogdoches, TX
November 6, 2026*; 6:30 pm, ESPN+		Texas Lutheran	W 89–32	2–0	10 – Tied	6 – Tied	8 – Simmons	William R. Johnson Coliseum (1,226); Nacogdoches, TX
November 11, 2026*; 7:00 pm, ESPN+		at Abilene Christian	W 76–71	3–0	21 – Makke	8 – Daniel	3 – Green	Moody Coliseum (909); Abilene, TX
November 14, 2026*; 1:00 pm, ESPN+		Rice						William R. Johnson Coliseum; Nacogdoches, TX
November 20, 2026*; 2:00 pm, ESPN+		vs. Indiana State; Paradise Jam Opening Round						UVI Sports and Fitness Center; Charlotte Amalie, USVI
November 21/22, 2026*; ESPN+		vs. Temple/Middle Tennessee; Paradise Jam						UVI Sports and Fitness Center; Charlotte Amalie, USVI
November 23, 2026*; ESPN+		vs. Paradise Jam						UVI Sports and Fitness Center; Charlotte Amalie, USVI
December 1, 2026*; 7:00 pm, ACCNX		at SMU						Moody Coliseum; University Park, TX
December 5, 2026; 4:30 pm, ESPN+		East Texas A&M						William R. Johnson Coliseum; Nacogdoches, TX
December 9, 2026*; 6:30 pm, ESPN+		UT Arlington						William R. Johnson Coliseum; Nacogdoches, TX
December 12, 2026*; 3:00 pm, ESPN+		at Louisiana Tech						Thomas Assembly Center; Ruston, LA
December 19, 2026; 4:30 pm, ESPN+		at UT Rio Grande Valley						UTRGV Fieldhouse; Edinburg, TX
December 21, 2026; 7:00 pm, ESPN+		at Texas A&M–Corpus Christi						Hilliard Center; Corpus Christi, TX
December 29, 2026; 6:30 pm, ESPN+		Northwestern State						William R. Johnson Coliseum; Nacogdoches, TX
January 2, 2027; 4:30 pm, ESPN+		Southeastern Louisiana						William R. Johnson Coliseum; Nacogdoches, TX
January 4, 2027; 8:30 pm, CBSSN		at McNeese						Townsley Law Arena; Lake Charles, LA
January 9, 2027; 3:30 pm, ESPN+		at Houston Christian						Sharp Gymnasium; Houston, TX
January 11, 2027; 6:00 pm, ESPN+		at Incarnate Word						McDermott Center; San Antonio, TX
January 16, 2027; 4:30 pm, ESPN+		LSU New Orleans						William R. Johnson Coliseum; Nacogdoches, TX
January 18, 2027; 6:30 pm, ESPN+		Nicholls						William R. Johnson Coliseum; Nacogdoches, TX
January 22, 2027; 8:00 pm, CBSSN		McNeese						William R. Johnson Coliseum; Nacogdoches, TX
January 26, 2027; 6:00 pm, ESPN+		at Southeastern Louisiana						Pride Roofing University Center; Hammond, LA
January 30, 2027; 4:30 pm, ESPN+		Lamar						William R. Johnson Coliseum; Nacogdoches, TX
February 1, 2027; 6:30 pm, ESPN+		at Northwestern State						Prather Coliseum; Natchitoches, LA
February 6, 2027; 6:00 pm, ESPN+		at Lamar						Neches Arena; Beaumont, TX
February 8, 2027; 6:30 pm, ESPN+		at East Texas A&M						The Field House; Commerce, TX
February 13, 2027; 4:30 pm, ESPN+		UT Rio Grande Valley						William R. Johnson Coliseum; Nacogdoches, TX
February 15, 2027; 6:30 pm, ESPN+		Texas A&M–Corpus Christi						William R. Johnson Coliseum; Nacogdoches, TX
February 19, 2027; 8:00 pm, CBSSN		at Nicholls						Stopher Gymnasium; Thibodaux, LA
February 22, 2027; 6:30 pm, ESPN+		at LSU New Orleans						Lakefront Arena; New Orleans, LA
February 27, 2027; 4:30 pm, ESPN+		Houston Christian						William R. Johnson Coliseum; Nacogdoches, TX
March 1, 2027; 6:30 pm, ESPN+		Incarnate Word						William R. Johnson Coliseum; Nacogdoches, TX
Southland Conference tournament
March 7–10, 2027								Townsley Law Arena; Lake Charles, LA
*Non-conference game. ^{#}Rankings from AP poll. (#) Tournament seedings in parentheses. All times are in Central.
