= 2026–27 Southeastern Louisiana Lions basketball team =

American college basketball season

2026–27 Southeastern Louisiana Lions basketball
- Conference: Southland Conference
- Record: 1–2 (0–0 Southland)
- Head coach: David Kiefer (8th season)
- Associate head coach: Bruce Shingler
- Assistant coaches: Cody McCoy; Drew Riley; Randy Shuman
- Home arena: Pride Roofing University Center (Capacity: 7,500)

2026–27 Southland Conference men's basketball standings
	Conf.				Overall
Team	W		L	PCT	W		L	PCT
Houston Christian	0	–	0	–	3	–	0	1.000
Stephen F. Austin	0	–	0	–	3	–	0	1.000
East Texas A&M	0	–	0	–	2	–	1	.667
Lamar	0	–	0	–	2	–	1	.667
McNeese	0	–	0	–	2	–	1	.667
Texas A&M–Corpus Christi	0	–	0	–	2	–	1	.667
UT Rio Grande Valley	0	–	0	–	2	–	1	.667
LSU New Orleans	0	–	0	–	1	–	1	.500
Nicholls	0	–	0	–	1	–	2	.333
Southeastern Louisiana	0	–	0	–	1	–	2	.333
Northwestern State	0	–	0	–	1	–	3	.250
Incarnate Word	0	–	0	–	0	–	4	.000
† 2027 Southland tournament winner As of November 13, 2026; Rankings from AP poll

The 2026–27 Southeastern Louisiana Lions basketball team represents Southeastern Louisiana University during the 2026–27 NCAA Division I men's basketball season. The Lions, led by eighth-year head coach David Kiefer, play their home games at the Pride Roofing University Center in Hammond, Louisiana as members of the Southland Conference.

== Previous season ==
The Lions finished the 2025–26 season 9–22, 6–16 in Southland play, to finish in a tie for eleventh (last) place. They failed to qualify for the Southland Conference tournament, as only the top eight teams qualify.

== Preseason ==
On October 20, 2026, the Southland Conference released their preseason poll. Southeastern Louisiana was picked to finish in ninth place.

=== Preseason rankings ===
Southland Preseason Poll
Place	Team	Votes
1	McNeese	121 (11)
2	Stephen F. Austin	109
3	Texas A&M–Corpus Christi	98 (1)
4	Lamar	91
5	UT Rio Grande Valley	78
6	LSU New Orleans	68
7	Houston Christian	47
8	Northwestern State	45
9	Southeastern Louisiana	38
10	Nicholls	37
11	Incarnate Word	36
12	East Texas A&M	24
(#) first-place votes

== Roster ==
2026–27 Southeastern Louisiana Lions men's basketball team
Players
Coaches

Pos.	#	Name	Height	Weight	Year	Previous school	Hometown
G	0	Logan Suber	6 ft 0 in (1.83 m)	180 lb (82 kg)	Sr	Lipscomb	Fredericksburg, Virginia
G	1	Jackson Furman	6 ft 2 in (1.88 m)	176 lb (80 kg)	So	Army	Upper Marlboro, Maryland
F	2	Ashley Sims II	6 ft 8 in (2.03 m)	228 lb (103 kg)	So	Bryant	Glen Burnie, Maryland
G	3	Tyler Rolison	6 ft 0 in (1.83 m)	191 lb (87 kg)	Sr	Nevada	Los Angeles, California
G	4	Tybo Bailey	6 ft 2 in (1.88 m)	178 lb (81 kg)	Jr	East Carolina	Winston-Salem, North Carolina
F	5	JJ Massaquoi	6 ft 6 in (1.98 m)	257 lb (117 kg)	So	UMass Lowell	Prince George's County, Maryland
G	6	Terran Perry	6 ft 3 in (1.91 m)	168 lb (76 kg)	Fr	Hammond High Magnet School	Hammond, Louisiana
G	7	Pablo Jimenez	6 ft 0 in (1.83 m)	175 lb (79 kg)	Fr	Aquinas American School	Madrid, Spain
G	8	Quincy Allen (5th)	6 ft 8 in (2.03 m)	205 lb (93 kg)	Sr	Bryant	Silver Spring, Maryland
G	9	Gio Sanford	6 ft 4 in (1.93 m)	185 lb (84 kg)	So	Bryant	Glenn Dale, Maryland
C	10	Daniel Akoue	6 ft 10 in (2.08 m)	185 lb (84 kg)	So	Bryant	Libreville, Gabon
G	11	Haki Muhammad II	6 ft 2 in (1.88 m)	180 lb (82 kg)	So	Murray State College	Landover, Maryland
G	12	Jaheim Nyam (5th)	6 ft 3 in (1.91 m)	202 lb (92 kg)	Sr	Bryant	Paris, France
G	15	Cody Al-Naziat	6 ft 2 in (1.88 m)	180 lb (82 kg)	So	Ponchatoula High School	Hammond, Louisiana
F	23	Yanis Ndjonga (5th)	6 ft 8 in (2.03 m)	222 lb (101 kg)	Sr	McNeese	Yaoundé, Cameroon
F	32	Garrett Shoemaker	6 ft 9 in (2.06 m)	212 lb (96 kg)	So	Oak Forest Academy	Livingston, Louisiana

Head coach

- David Kiefer (Kansas State)

Assistant coach(es)

- Bruce Shingler (St. Augustine's)
- Cody McCoy (UT Arlington)
- Drew Riley (Arkansas State)
- Randy Shuman (Salem)

Legend

- (C) Team captain
- (S) Suspended
- (I) Ineligible
- (W) Walk-on
- (5th) Fifth-year senior
- Injured
- Current redshirt

Roster
Last update: November 13, 2026

== Schedule and results ==
Date time, TV	Rank^{#}	Opponent^{#}	Result	Record	High points	High rebounds	High assists	Site (attendance) city, state
Regular season
November 4, 2026*; 7:00 pm, SECN+		at Auburn	L 59–92	0–1	16 – Allen	6 – Tied	4 – Rolison	Neville Arena (9,121); Auburn, AL
November 7, 2026*; 7:00 pm, ESPN+		at Little Rock	W 83–79	1–1	21 – Furman	6 – Tied	6 – Rolison	Jack Stephens Center (2,085); Little Rock, AR
November 10, 2026*; 7:30 pm, SECN+		at Ole Miss	L 51–91	1–2	13 – Furman	6 – Sims II	2 – Tied	SJB Pavilion (6,395); University, MS
November 16, 2026*; 7:30 pm, SECN+		at Texas A&M						Reed Arena; College Station, TX
November 20, 2026*; 6:00 pm, ESPN+		at Kennesaw State; Cancún Challenge campus game						VyStar Arena; Kennesaw, GA
November 24, 2026*; 11:30 am, FloCollege		vs. Northern Colorado; Cancún Challenge Mayan Division						Hard Rock Hotel Riviera Maya; Cancún, Mexico
November 25, 2026*; 11:30 am/2:00 pm, FloCollege		vs. North Dakota/Detroit Mercy; Cancún Challenge Mayan Division						Hard Rock Hotel Riviera Maya; Cancún, Mexico
December 1, 2026*; 6:00 pm, ESPN+		at George Washington						Charles E. Smith Center; Washington, D.C.
December 5, 2026; 1:00 pm, ESPN+		Incarnate Word						Pride Roofing University Center; Hammond, LA
December 7, 2026; 6:00 pm, ESPN+		Houston Christian						Pride Roofing University Center; Hammond, LA
December 10, 2026*; 9:00 pm, ACCNX		at California						Haas Pavilion; Berkeley, CA
December 12, 2026*; 11:00 pm, MW+		at Hawaiʻi						Stan Sheriff Center; Honolulu, HI
December 19, 2026; 5:00 pm, ESPN+		at East Texas A&M						The Field House; Commerce, TX
December 21, 2026; 6:30 pm, ESPN+		at Northwestern State						Prather Coliseum; Natchitoches, LA
December 23, 2026*; 6:00 pm, ESPN+		at Dayton						UD Arena; Dayton, OH
January 2, 2027; 4:30 pm, ESPN+		at Stephen F. Austin						William R. Johnson Coliseum; Nacogdoches, TX
January 4, 2027; 6:00 pm, ESPN+		at Lamar						Neches Arena; Beaumont, TX
January 9, 2027; 3:30 pm, ESPN+		McNeese						Pride Roofing University Center; Hammond, LA
January 11, 2027; 6:30 pm, ESPN+		at LSU New Orleans						Lakefront Arena; New Orleans, LA
January 16, 2027; 3:30 pm, ESPN+		Texas A&M–Corpus Christi						Pride Roofing University Center; Hammond, LA
January 18, 2027; 6:00 pm, ESPN+		UT Rio Grande Valley						Pride Roofing University Center; Hammond, LA
January 23, 2027; 3:30 pm, ESPN+		Lamar						Pride Roofing University Center; Hammond, LA
January 26, 2027; 6:00 pm, ESPN+		Stephen F. Austin						Pride Roofing University Center; Hammond, LA
January 30, 2027; 4:00 pm, ESPN+		at McNeese						Townsley Law Arena; Lake Charles, LA
February 1, 2027; 6:00 pm, ESPN+		Nicholls						Pride Roofing University Center; Hammond, LA
February 6, 2027; 3:30 pm, ESPN+		at Houston Christian						Sharp Gymnasium; Houston, TX
February 8, 2027; 5:00 pm, ESPN+		at Incarnate Word						McDermott Center; San Antonio, TX
February 13, 2027; 3:30 pm, ESPN+		Northwestern State						Pride Roofing University Center; Hammond, LA
February 15, 2027; 6:00 pm, ESPN+		East Texas A&M						Pride Roofing University Center; Hammond, LA
February 20, 2027; 4:30 pm, ESPN+		at UT Rio Grande Valley						UTRGV Fieldhouse; Edinburg, TX
February 22, 2027; 7:00 pm, ESPN+		at Texas A&M–Corpus Christi						Hilliard Center; Corpus Christi, TX
February 27, 2027; 3:30 pm, ESPN+		LSU New Orleans						Pride Roofing University Center; Hammond, LA
March 1, 2027; 6:30 pm, ESPN+		at Nicholls						Stopher Gymnasium; Thibodaux, LA
Southland Conference tournament
March 7–10, 2027; ESPN+		vs.						Townsley Law Arena; Lake Charles, LA
*Non-conference game. ^{#}Rankings from AP poll. (#) Tournament seedings in parentheses. All times are in Central.
