= 2026–27 Lamar Cardinals basketball team =

American college basketball season

2026–27 Lamar Cardinals basketball
- Conference: Southland Conference
- Record: 2–1 (0–0 Southland)
- Head coach: Jordan Fee (1st season)
- Assistant coaches: Aaron Smith; Tyler Kelly; Myo Baxter-Bell; Tyler Slick
- Home arena: Neches Arena

2026–27 Southland Conference men's basketball standings
	Conf.				Overall
Team	W		L	PCT	W		L	PCT
Houston Christian	0	–	0	–	3	–	0	1.000
Stephen F. Austin	0	–	0	–	3	–	0	1.000
East Texas A&M	0	–	0	–	2	–	1	.667
Lamar	0	–	0	–	2	–	1	.667
McNeese	0	–	0	–	2	–	1	.667
Texas A&M–Corpus Christi	0	–	0	–	2	–	1	.667
UT Rio Grande Valley	0	–	0	–	2	–	1	.667
LSU New Orleans	0	–	0	–	1	–	1	.500
Nicholls	0	–	0	–	1	–	2	.333
Southeastern Louisiana	0	–	0	–	1	–	2	.333
Northwestern State	0	–	0	–	1	–	3	.250
Incarnate Word	0	–	0	–	0	–	4	.000
† 2027 Southland tournament winner As of November 12, 2026; Rankings from AP poll

The 2026–27 Lamar Cardinals basketball team will represent Lamar University during the 2026–27 NCAA Division I men's basketball season. The Cardinals, who will be led by first-year head coach Jordan Fee, will play their home games at the Neches Arena in Beaumont, Texas as members of the Southland Conference.

== Previous season ==
The Cardinals finished the 2025–26 season 12–19, 7–15 in Southland play, to finish in a tie for ninth place. They failed to qualify for the Southland Conference tournament, as only the top eight teams qualify.

Following the season, on March 3, 2026, the school announced that they would not be retaining head coach Alvin Brooks, ending his five-year tenure with the team. On March 14, the school announced that they would be hiring Florida Atlantic associate head coach Jordan Fee as the team's new head coach.

== Preseason ==
On October 20, 2026, the Southland Conference released their preseason poll. Lamar was picked to finish fourth in the conference.

=== Preseason rankings ===
Southland Preseason Poll
Place	Team	Votes
1	McNeese	121 (11)
2	Stephen F. Austin	109
3	Texas A&M–Corpus Christi	98 (1)
4	Lamar	91
5	UT Rio Grande Valley	78
6	LSU New Orleans	68
7	Houston Christian	47
8	Northwestern State	45
9	Southeastern Louisiana	38
10	Nicholls	37
11	Incarnate Word	36
12	East Texas A&M	24
(#) first-place votes

== Roster ==
2026–27 Lamar Cardinals men's basketball team
Players
Coaches

Pos.	#	Name	Height	Weight	Year	Previous school	Hometown
F	0	Caden Hinker	6 ft 7 in (2.01 m)	210 lb (95 kg)	Sr	Augustana	Mitchell, South Dakota
G	2	Lamont Hartfileld	6 ft 6 in (1.98 m)	206 lb (93 kg)	So	Florida SouthWestern State College	Dallas, Texas
G	3	Quante Berry	6 ft 4 in (1.93 m)	195 lb (88 kg)	Sr	Memphis	Cleveland, Tennessee
F	4	Abeeng Agot	6 ft 7 in (2.01 m)	185 lb (84 kg)	Jr	Murray State College	Edmonton, Alberta
F	5	Dominic Eason	6 ft 7 in (2.01 m)	200 lb (91 kg)	Jr	USC Beaufort	Lyons, Georgia
G	7	Mike Collins	6 ft 1 in (1.85 m)	195 lb (88 kg)	So	Louisiana	Pearland, Texas
G	10	Santana Lynch	6 ft 5 in (1.96 m)	190 lb (86 kg)	Jr	Hampden–Sydney	Dallas, Texas
F	11	Matt Reed	6 ft 10 in (2.08 m)	230 lb (104 kg)	Sr	Iona	Carrollton, Texas
F	21	Marko Ljubicic	6 ft 10 in (2.08 m)	224 lb (102 kg)	Jr	Manhattan	Zagreb, Croatia
G	22	Jeremiah Jones	6 ft 3 in (1.91 m)	190 lb (86 kg)	Sr	Washburn	South Holland, Illinois
G	23	M.J. Wardlow	6 ft 2 in (1.88 m)	175 lb (79 kg)	Jr	Trinity Valley Community College	Bowling Green, Kentucky
G	25	Nico Moretti	6 ft 1 in (1.85 m)	180 lb (82 kg)	Sr	Florida Atlantic	Bologna, Italy
G	33	Filip Radakovic	6 ft 7 in (2.01 m)	200 lb (91 kg)	Jr	UT Martin	Belgrade, Serbia
G	81	Martin Minarovjech	6 ft 9 in (2.06 m)	187 lb (85 kg)	Fr	Inter SB Bratislava	Bratislava, Slovakia

Head coach

- Jordan Fee (West Liberty)

Assistant coach(es)

- Aaron Smith (Prairie View A&M)
- Tyler Kelly (Florida Southern)
- Myo Baxter-Bell (Liberty)
- Tyler Slick (Minnesota State)

Legend

- (C) Team captain
- (S) Suspended
- (I) Ineligible
- (W) Walk-on
- Injured
- Current redshirt

Roster
Last update: October 30, 2026

== Schedule and results ==
Date time, TV	Rank^{#}	Opponent^{#}	Result	Record	High points	High rebounds	High assists	Site (attendance) city, state
Regular season
November 2, 2026*; 7:30 pm, ESPN+		Schreiner	W 124–62	1–0	22 – Berry	13 – Radakovic	6 – Moretti	Neches Arena (1,055); Beaumont, TX
November 7, 2026*; 1:00 pm, ESPN+		at Abilene Christian	L 81–83	1–1	20 – Berry	10 – Jones	8 – Moretti	Moody Coliseum (803); Abilene, TX
November 11, 2026*; 6:00 pm, ESPN+		Centenary	W 122–57	2–1	23 – Agot	11 – Minarovjech	7 – Collins	Neches Arena (1,055); Beaumont, TX
November 17, 2026*; 7:00 pm		at Omaha						Baxter Arena; Omaha, NE
November 22, 2026*; 4:00 pm		vs. Rice; Jacksonville Classic						The Reef; Jacksonville, FL
November 24, 2026*; 5:30 pm		vs. Robert Morris; Jacksonville Classic						The Reef; Jacksonville, FL
December 2, 2026*; 6:00 pm, ESPN+		Louisiana–Monroe						Neches Arena; Beaumont, TX
December 5, 2026; 6:00 pm, ESPN+		Northwestern State						Neches Arena; Beaumont, TX
December 7, 2026; 6:00 pm, ESPN+		East Texas A&M						Neches Arena; Beaumont, TX
December 10, 2026*; 1:00 pm		at Portland						Chiles Center; Portland, OR
December 11, 2026*; 8:30 pm		at Oregon State						Gill Coliseum; Corvallis, OR
December 19, 2026; 3:30 pm, ESPN+		at Texas A&M–Corpus Christi						Hilliard Center; Corpus Christi, TX
December 21, 2026; 6:30 pm, ESPN+		at UT Rio Grande Valley						UTRGV Fieldhouse; Edinburg, TX
December 29, 2026*; 8:00 pm		at Boise State						ExtraMile Arena; Boise, ID
January 2, 2027; 4:00 pm, ESPN+		at McNeese						Townsley Law Arena; Lake Charles, LA
January 4, 2027; 6:00 pm, ESPN+		Southeastern Louisiana						Neches Arena; Beaumont, TX
January 9, 2027; 4:00 pm, ESPN+		at Incarnate Word						McDermott Center; San Antonio, TX
January 11, 2027; 7:00 pm, ESPN+		at Houston Christian						Sharp Gymnasium; Houston, TX
January 16, 2027; 6:00 pm, ESPN+		Nicholls						Neches Arena; Beaumont, TX
January 18, 2027; 6:00 pm, ESPN+		LSU New Orleans						Neches Arena; Beaumont, TX
January 23, 2027; 3:30 pm, ESPN+		at Southeastern Louisiana						Pride Roofing University Center; Hammond, LA
January 26, 2027; 6:00 pm, ESPN+		McNeese						Neches Arena; Beaumont, TX
January 30, 2027; 4:30 pm, ESPN+		at Stephen F. Austin						William R. Johnson Coliseum; Nacogdoches, TX
February 1, 2027; 6:30 pm, ESPN+		at East Texas A&M						The Field House; Commerce, TX
February 6, 2027; 6:00 pm, ESPN+		Stephen F. Austin						Neches Arena; Beaumont, TX
February 8, 2027; 6:30 pm, ESPN+		at Northwestern State						Prather Coliseum; Natchitoches, LA
February 13, 2027; 6:00 pm, ESPN+		Texas A&M–Corpus Christi						Neches Arena; Beaumont, TX
February 15, 2027; 6:00 pm, ESPN+		UT Rio Grande Valley						Neches Arena; Beaumont, TX
February 20, 2027; 5:00 pm, ESPN+		at LSU New Orleans						Lakefront Arena; New Orleans, LA
February 22, 2027; 6:30 pm, ESPN+		at Nicholls						Stopher Gymnasium; Thibodaux, LA
February 27, 2027; 6:00 pm, ESPN+		Incarnate Word						Neches Arena; Beaumont, TX
March 1, 2027; 6:00 pm, ESPN+		Houston Christian						Neches Arena; Beaumont, TX
Southland tournament
March 7–10, 2027		vs.						Townsley Law Arena; Lake Charles, LA
*Non-conference game. ^{#}Rankings from AP poll. (#) Tournament seedings in parentheses. All times are in Central.
