= 2026–27 Northwestern State Demons basketball team =

American college basketball season

2026–27 Northwestern State Demons basketball
- Conference: Southland Conference
- Record: 1–3 (0–0 Southland)
- Head coach: Rick Cabrera (4th season)
- Associate head coach: Anthony Figueroa
- Assistant coaches: Luke Darst; Hayden Harkins; Lance Erving
- Home arena: Prather Coliseum

2026–27 Southland Conference men's basketball standings
| | Conf. | | | | Overall |
| Team | W | | L | PCT | W | | L | PCT |
|---|---|---|---|---|---|---|---|---|
| Houston Christian | 0 | – | 0 | – | 3 | – | 0 | 1.000 |
| Stephen F. Austin | 0 | – | 0 | – | 3 | – | 0 | 1.000 |
| East Texas A&M | 0 | – | 0 | – | 2 | – | 1 | .667 |
| Lamar | 0 | – | 0 | – | 2 | – | 1 | .667 |
| McNeese | 0 | – | 0 | – | 2 | – | 1 | .667 |
| Texas A&M–Corpus Christi | 0 | – | 0 | – | 2 | – | 1 | .667 |
| UT Rio Grande Valley | 0 | – | 0 | – | 2 | – | 1 | .667 |
| LSU New Orleans | 0 | – | 0 | – | 1 | – | 1 | .500 |
| Nicholls | 0 | – | 0 | – | 1 | – | 2 | .333 |
| Southeastern Louisiana | 0 | – | 0 | – | 1 | – | 2 | .333 |
| Northwestern State | 0 | – | 0 | – | 1 | – | 3 | .250 |
| Incarnate Word | 0 | – | 0 | – | 0 | – | 4 | .000 |
† 2027 Southland tournament winner As of November 13, 2026; Rankings from AP poll

The 2026–27 Northwestern State Demons basketball team represents Northwestern State University of Louisiana during the 2026–27 NCAA Division I men's basketball season. The Demons, led by fourth-year head coach Rick Cabrera, play their home games at Prather Coliseum in Natchitoches, Louisiana as members of the Southland Conference.

== Previous season ==
The Demons finished the 2025–26 season 10–22, 8–14 in Southland play, to finish in a tie for seventh place. As the #7 seed in the Southland tournament, they were defeated by #6 seed Nicholls in the first round.

== Preseason ==
On October 20, 2026, the Southland Conference released their preseason poll. Northwestern State was picked to finish in eighth place.

=== Preseason rankings ===
Southland Preseason Poll
| Place | Team | Votes |
|---|---|---|
| 1 | McNeese | 121 (11) |
| 2 | Stephen F. Austin | 109 |
| 3 | Texas A&M–Corpus Christi | 98 (1) |
| 4 | Lamar | 91 |
| 5 | UT Rio Grande Valley | 78 |
| 6 | LSU New Orleans | 68 |
| 7 | Houston Christian | 47 |
| 8 | Northwestern State | 45 |
| 9 | Southeastern Louisiana | 38 |
| 10 | Nicholls | 37 |
| 11 | Incarnate Word | 36 |
| 12 | East Texas A&M | 24 |
(#) first-place votes

== Roster ==
2026–27 Northwestern State Demons men's basketball team
Players
Coaches

| Pos. | # | Name | Height | Weight | Year | Previous school | Hometown |
|---|---|---|---|---|---|---|---|
| G | 0 | Izzy Miles | 6 ft 2 in (1.88 m) | 190 lb (86 kg) | Sr | Tarleton State | Huntsville, Alabama |
| F | 1 | Isaiah Vick | 6 ft 8 in (2.03 m) | 215 lb (98 kg) | So | Wingate | Manassas, Virginia |
| F | 2 | Cam Kelly | 6 ft 6 in (1.98 m) | 200 lb (91 kg) | Jr | College of the Sequoias | Decatur, Georgia |
| F | 3 | Arne Osojnik | 6 ft 6 in (1.98 m) | 200 lb (91 kg) | Sr | Northern Arizona | Ljubljana, Slovenia |
| G | 4 | Kai Simpson | 6 ft 3 in (1.91 m) | 205 lb (93 kg) | Jr | Thomas More | Lexington, Kentucky |
| G | 5 | Antoine Almuttar | 6 ft 4 in (1.93 m) | 200 lb (91 kg) | Fr | Parish Episcopal School | Dallas, Texas |
| F | 8 | Dionjahe Thomas (5th) | 6 ft 8 in (2.03 m) | 230 lb (104 kg) | Sr | Jackson State | Houma, Louisiana |
| G | 10 | CJ Larry | 6 ft 3 in (1.91 m) | 180 lb (82 kg) | So | Jonesboro High School | Jonesboro, Arkansas |
| G | 11 | Doyle Brown | 6 ft 2 in (1.88 m) | 190 lb (86 kg) | Jr | Richard Bland College | Fairfax, Virginia |
| G | 12 | Boogii Remo | 6 ft 2 in (1.88 m) | 170 lb (77 kg) | Fr | Natchitoches Central High School | Natchitoches, Louisiana |
| F | 13 | Nathan Ojukwu | 6 ft 7 in (2.01 m) | 225 lb (102 kg) | Sr | Dakota State | Tampa, Florida |
| F | 15 | Jayden Nesbitt | 6 ft 9 in (2.06 m) | 215 lb (98 kg) | Jr | Walters State | Huntsville, Alabama |
| G | 22 | Armon Almuttar | 6 ft 4 in (1.93 m) | 205 lb (93 kg) | Fr | Parish Episcopal School | Dallas, Texas |
| F | 23 | Kordrick Turner | 6 ft 6 in (1.98 m) | 240 lb (109 kg) | Sr | Paris Junior College | Sulphur Springs, Texas |

Head coach

- Rick Cabrera (Tennessee Tech)

Assistant coach(es)

- Anthony Figueroa (Millikin)
- Luke Darst (Arkansas State)
- Hayden Harkins (Elmira)
- Lance Erving (Niagara)

Legend

- (C) Team captain
- (S) Suspended
- (I) Ineligible
- (W) Walk-on
- (5th) Fifth-year senior
- Injured
- Current redshirt

Roster
Last update: November 13, 2026

== Schedule and results ==
| Date time, TV | Rank^{#} | Opponent^{#} | Result | Record | High points | High rebounds | High assists | Site (attendance) city, state |
Exhibition
| October 26, 2026*; 7:00 pm | | at North Texas | W 62–60 | – | 23 – Simpson | 7 – Turner | 4 – Simpson | The Super Pit (1,314); Denton, TX |
Regular season
| November 2, 2026*; 8:30 pm, ESPN+ | | at Baylor | L 65–87 | 0–1 | 17 – Simpson | 7 – Tied | 3 – Simpson | Foster Pavilion (5,022); Waco, TX |
| November 5, 2026*; 6:30 pm, SECN+ | | at Mississippi State | L 44–82 | 0–2 | 13 – Simpson | 6 – Tied | 2 – Simpson | Humphrey Coliseum (6,126); Starkville, MS |
| November 7, 2026*; 7:00 pm, ESPN+ | | at Murray State | L 71–93 | 0–3 | 24 – Simpson | 8 – Turner | 6 – Ojukwu | CFSB Center (5,721); Murray, KY |
| November 10, 2026*; 6:30 pm, ESPN+ | | Millsaps | W 77–49 | 1–3 | 17 – Simpson | 11 – Vick | 3 – Turner | Prather Coliseum (458); Natchitoches, LA |
| November 14, 2026*; 7:00 pm, ESPN+ | | at Little Rock | | | | | | Jack Stephens Center; Little Rock, AR |
| November 20, 2026*; 6:30 pm, ESPN+ | | UT Arlington | | | | | | Prather Coliseum; Natchitoches, LA |
| November 25, 2026*; 5:00 pm, ESPN+ | | West Florida | | | | | | Prather Coliseum; Natchitoches, LA |
| December 1, 2026*; 12:00 pm, ESPN+ | | Ecclesia | | | | | | Prather Coliseum; Natchitoches, LA |
| December 5, 2026; 6:00 pm, ESPN+ | | at Lamar | | | | | | Neches Arena; Beaumont, TX |
| December 8, 2026*; 8:00 pm, MW+ | | at Grand Canyon | | | | | | Global Credit Union Arena; Phoenix, AZ |
| December 14, 2026*; 6:00 pm, ESPN+ | | at UT Martin | | | | | | Skyhawk Arena; Martin, TN |
| December 19, 2026; 3:30 pm, ESPN+ | | McNeese | | | | | | Prather Coliseum; Natchitoches, LA |
| December 21, 2026; 6:30 pm, ESPN+ | | Southeastern Louisiana | | | | | | Prather Coliseum; Natchitoches, LA |
| December 29, 2026; 6:30 pm, ESPN+ | | at Stephen F. Austin | | | | | | William R. Johnson Coliseum; Nacogdoches, TX |
| January 2, 2027; 3:30 pm, ESPN+ | | LSU New Orleans | | | | | | Prather Coliseum; Natchitoches, LA |
| January 4, 2027; 6:30 pm, ESPN+ | | at Nicholls | | | | | | Stopher Gymnasium; Thibodaux, LA |
| January 9, 2027; 3:30 pm, ESPN+ | | at Texas A&M–Corpus Christi | | | | | | Hilliard Center; Corpus Christi, TX |
| January 11, 2027; 6:30 pm, ESPN+ | | at UT Rio Grande Valley | | | | | | UTRGV Fieldhouse; Edinburg, TX |
| January 16, 2027; 3:30 pm, ESPN+ | | Incarnate Word | | | | | | Prather Coliseum; Natchitoches, LA |
| January 18, 2027; 6:30 pm, ESPN+ | | Houston Christian | | | | | | Prather Coliseum; Natchitoches, LA |
| January 23, 2027; 3:30 pm, ESPN+ | | Nicholls | | | | | | Prather Coliseum; Natchitoches, LA |
| January 26, 2027; 6:30 pm, ESPN+ | | at LSU New Orleans | | | | | | Lakefront Arena; New Orleans, LA |
| January 30, 2027; 3:30 pm, ESPN+ | | East Texas A&M | | | | | | Prather Coliseum; Natchitoches, LA |
| February 1, 2027; 6:30 pm, ESPN+ | | Stephen F. Austin | | | | | | Prather Coliseum; Natchitoches, LA |
| February 6, 2027; 5:00 pm, ESPN+ | | at East Texas A&M | | | | | | The Field House; Commerce, TX |
| February 8, 2027; 6:30 pm, ESPN+ | | Lamar | | | | | | Prather Coliseum; Natchitoches, LA |
| February 13, 2027; 3:30 pm, ESPN+ | | at Southeastern Louisiana | | | | | | Pride Roofing University Center; Hammond, LA |
| February 15, 2027; 6:30 pm, ESPN+ | | at McNeese | | | | | | Townsley Law Arena; Lake Charles, LA |
| February 20, 2027; 7:00 pm, ESPN+ | | at Houston Christian | | | | | | Sharp Gymnasium; Houston, TX |
| February 22, 2027; 5:00 pm, ESPN+ | | at Incarnate Word | | | | | | McDermott Center; San Antonio, TX |
| February 26, 2027; 8:00 pm, CBSSN | | Texas A&M–Corpus Christi | | | | | | Prather Coliseum; Natchitoches, LA |
| March 1, 2027; 8:00 pm, ESPN+ | | UT Rio Grande Valley | | | | | | Prather Coliseum; Natchitoches, LA |
Southland Conference tournament
| March 7–10, 2027; ESPN+ | | vs. | | | | | | Townsley Law Arena; Lake Charles, LA |
*Non-conference game. ^{#}Rankings from AP poll. (#) Tournament seedings in parentheses. All times are in Central.
