= 2026–27 LSU New Orleans Privateers men's basketball team =

American college basketball season

2026–27 LSU New Orleans Privateers men's basketball
- Conference: Southland Conference
- Record: 2–2 (0–0 Southland)
- Head coach: Stacy Hollowell (3rd season)
- Associate head coach: Silvey Dominguez
- Assistant coaches: Andrew Fava; Zach Settembre; Ervin Johnson
- Home arena: Lakefront Arena

2026–27 Southland Conference men's basketball standings
	Conf.				Overall
Team	W		L	PCT	W		L	PCT
Houston Christian	0	–	0	–	4	–	0	1.000
Lamar	0	–	0	–	3	–	1	.750
Stephen F. Austin	0	–	0	–	3	–	1	.750
LSU New Orleans	0	–	0	–	2	–	1	.667
McNeese	0	–	0	–	2	–	1	.667
East Texas A&M	0	–	0	–	3	–	2	.600
UT Rio Grande Valley	0	–	0	–	2	–	2	.500
Nicholls	0	–	0	–	2	–	3	.400
Texas A&M–Corpus Christi	0	–	0	–	2	–	3	.400
Southeastern Louisiana	0	–	0	–	1	–	3	.250
Northwestern State	0	–	0	–	1	–	4	.200
Incarnate Word	0	–	0	–	0	–	4	.000
† 2027 Southland tournament winner As of November 19, 2026; Rankings from AP poll

The 2026–27 LSU New Orleans Privateers men's basketball team will represent the newly renamed LSU New Orleans during the 2026–27 NCAA Division I men's basketball season. The Privateers, who will be led by third-year head coach Stacy Hollowell, will play their home games at Lakefront Arena in New Orleans, Louisiana as members of the Southland Conference.

== Previous season ==
The Privateers finished the 2025–26 season 15–18, 12–10 in Southland play, to finish in a tie for fifth place. As the #5 seed in the Southland tournament, they defeated #8 seed Houston Christian in the first round, before falling to #4 seed Texas A&M–Corpus Christi in the quarterfinals.

This was the final season for the school under the "New Orleans" branding. On July 1, 2026, the university rejoined the Louisiana State University System, adopting the new school name of LSU New Orleans and changing its athletic brand accordingly, but retaining the Privateers nickname.

== Preseason ==
On October 20, 2026, the Southland Conference released their preseason poll. LSU New Orleans was picked to finish sixth in the conference.

=== Preseason rankings ===
Southland Preseason Poll
Place	Team	Votes
1	McNeese	121 (11)
2	Stephen F. Austin	109
3	Texas A&M–Corpus Christi	98 (1)
4	Lamar	91
5	UT Rio Grande Valley	78
6	LSU New Orleans	68
7	Houston Christian	47
8	Northwestern State	45
9	Southeastern Louisiana	38
10	Nicholls	37
11	Incarnate Word	36
12	East Texas A&M	24
(#) first-place votes

== Roster ==
2026–27 LSU New Orleans Privateers men's basketball team
Players
Coaches

Pos.	#	Name	Height	Weight	Year	Previous school	Hometown
G	0	Yohandry Ortiz	6 ft 5 in (1.96 m)	190 lb (86 kg)	Jr	South Plains College	Naples, Florida
PG	2	Marcus McDonald	6 ft 3 in (1.91 m)	185 lb (84 kg)	Fr	Overtime Elite	Gilbert, Arizona
PG	3	Autrail Manning Jr.	6 ft 1 in (1.85 m)	165 lb (75 kg)	Fr	John Curtis Christian School	New Orleans, Louisiana
F	4	Solomon Ominu	6 ft 8 in (2.03 m)	225 lb (102 kg)	Jr	Midland College	Kaduna, Nigeria
G	5	Nick Jones	6 ft 2 in (1.88 m)	170 lb (77 kg)	Sr	Wagner	Edgewood, Missouri
F	7	Alan Shi	6 ft 10 in (2.08 m)	250 lb (113 kg)	Fr	Brookline High School	Brookline, Massachusetts
F	10	Eze Nwakamma	6 ft 8 in (2.03 m)	205 lb (93 kg)	So	Lake Ridge High School	Dallas, Texas
G	11	Kahlil Singleton	6 ft 3 in (1.91 m)	195 lb (88 kg)	Sr	Canisius	Vancouver, Washington
F	13	Jaydon Awe	6 ft 10 in (2.08 m)	230 lb (104 kg)	So	Northern Oklahoma College	Stevens Point, Wisconsin
F	14	Walter Campbell	6 ft 7 in (2.01 m)	220 lb (100 kg)	Sr	Lincoln Memorial	Frankfort, Kentucky
G	15	Jamal Chretien II	6 ft 6 in (1.98 m)	175 lb (79 kg)	So	Mayde Creek High School	Katy, Texas
G	20	Sam Parson	6 ft 3 in (1.91 m)	195 lb (88 kg)	So	Columbia State Community College	Tracy City, Tennessee
F	21	Kedrick Osby	6 ft 7 in (2.01 m)	205 lb (93 kg)	Sr	Pearl River Community College	Moss Point, Mississippi
F	23	Kyran Ratliff (5th)	6 ft 8 in (2.03 m)	205 lb (93 kg)	Sr	Louisiana	New Orleans, Louisiana
F	24	Cham Okey	6 ft 7 in (2.01 m)	215 lb (98 kg)	Jr	North Dakota State College of Science	Austin, Minnesota
F	25	Enzo Boudouma	6 ft 9 in (2.06 m)	210 lb (95 kg)	So	Tilton School	Fribourg, Switzerland
C	34	Jonathan Pace	6 ft 10 in (2.08 m)	275 lb (125 kg)	Jr	Mississippi Valley State	Gulfport, Mississippi

Head coach

- Stacy Hollowell (St. Edward's)

Assistant coach(es)

- Silvey Dominguez (New Mexico)
- Andrew Fava (Florida)
- Zach Settembre (Syracuse)
- Ervin Johnson (New Orleans)

Legend

- (C) Team captain
- (S) Suspended
- (I) Ineligible
- (W) Walk-on
- (5th) Fifth-year senior
- Injured
- Current redshirt

Roster
Last update: November 3, 2026

== Schedule and results ==
Date time, TV	Rank^{#}	Opponent^{#}	Result	Record	High points	High rebounds	High assists	Site (attendance) city, state
Exhibition
October 21, 2026*; 6:00 pm		at Southern Miss	W 82–72	–	19 – Jones	–	–	Reed Green Coliseum; Hattiesburg, MS
Regular season
November 3, 2026*; 7:00 pm, SECN+		at LSU	L 57–100	0–1	16 – Ortiz	8 – Ominu	1 – Tied	Pete Maravich Assembly Center (7,919); Baton Rouge, LA
November 7, 2026*; 1:00 pm, ESPN+		Loyola New Orleans	W 90–65	1–1	18 – Boudouma	8 – Boudouma	4 – McDonald	Lakefront Arena (2,472); New Orleans, LA
November 14, 2026*; 5:00 pm, ESPN+		Southern–New Orleans	W 98–82	2–1	34 – Singleton	12 – Boudouma	5 – Tied	Lakefront Arena (713); New Orleans, LA
November 18, 2026*; 6:30 pm, ESPN+		at No. 9 Texas Tech	L 41–86	2–2	12 – Osby	5 – Shi	2 – Tied	United Supermarkets Arena (11,791); Lubbock, TX
November 21, 2026*; 7:30 pm, YouTube		at Texas Southern						H&PE Arena; Houston, TX
November 25, 2026*; 3:00 pm, ESPN+		Grambling State						Lakefront Arena; New Orleans, LA
November 29, 2026*; 4:00 pm, ESPN+		Florida Gulf Coast						Lakefront Arena; New Orleans, LA
December 1, 2026*; 8:00 pm, ESPN+		at Arizona						McKale Center; Tucson, AZ
December 5, 2026; 5:00 pm, ESPN+		UT Rio Grande Valley						Lakefront Arena; New Orleans, LA
December 7, 2026; 6:30 pm, ESPN+		Texas A&M–Corpus Christi						Lakefront Arena; New Orleans, LA
December 13, 2026*		at Grambling State						Fredrick C. Hobdy Assembly Center; Grambling, LA
December 19, 2026; 3:30 pm, ESPN+		at Houston Christian						Sharp Gymnasium; Houston, TX
December 21, 2026; 11:00 am, ESPN+		at Incarnate Word						McDermott Center; San Antonio, TX
December 29, 2026*; 7:00 pm, ESPN2		at Kansas						Allen Fieldhouse; Lawrence, KS
January 2, 2027; 3:30 pm, ESPN+		at Northwestern State						Prather Coliseum; Natchitoches, LA
January 4, 2027; 6:30 pm, ESPN+		at East Texas A&M						The Field House; Commerce, TX
January 9, 2027; 5:00 pm, ESPN+		Nicholls						Lakefront Arena; New Orleans, LA
January 11, 2027; 6:30 pm, ESPN+		Southeastern Louisiana						Lakefront Arena; New Orleans, LA
January 16, 2027; 4:30 pm, ESPN+		at Stephen F. Austin						William R. Johnson Coliseum; Nacogdoches, TX
January 18, 2027; 6:00 pm, ESPN+		at Lamar						Neches Arena; Beaumont, TX
January 23, 2027; 5:00 pm, ESPN+		East Texas A&M						Lakefront Arena; New Orleans, LA
January 26, 2027; 6:30 pm, ESPN+		Northwestern State						Lakefront Arena; New Orleans, LA
January 30, 2027; 3:00 pm, ESPN+		at Nicholls						Stopher Gymnasium; Thibodaux, LA
February 1, 2027; 6:30 pm, ESPN+		McNeese						Lakefront Arena; New Orleans, LA
February 6, 2027; 4:30 pm, ESPN+		at UT Rio Grande Valley						UTRGV Fieldhouse; Edinburg, TX
February 8, 2027; 7:00 pm, ESPN+		at Texas A&M–Corpus Christi						Hilliard Center; Corpus Christi, TX
February 13, 2027; 5:00 pm, ESPN+		Houston Christian						Lakefront Arena; New Orleans, LA
February 15, 2027; 6:30 pm, ESPN+		Incarnate Word						Lakefront Arena; New Orleans, LA
February 20, 2027; 5:00 pm, ESPN+		Lamar						Lakefront Arena; New Orleans, LA
February 22, 2027; 6:30 pm, ESPN+		Stephen F. Austin						Lakefront Arena; New Orleans, LA
February 27, 2027; 3:30 pm, ESPN+		at Southeastern Louisiana						Pride Roofing University Center; Hammond, LA
March 1, 2027; 6:30 pm, ESPN+		at McNeese						Townsley Law Arena; Lake Charles, LA
Southland Conference tournament
March 7–10, 2027; ESPN+		vs.						Townsley Law Arena; Lake Charles, LA
*Non-conference game. ^{#}Rankings from AP poll. (#) Tournament seedings in parentheses. All times are in Central.
