= 2026–27 Incarnate Word Cardinals men's basketball team =

American college basketball season

2026–27 Incarnate Word Cardinals men's basketball
- Conference: Southland Conference
- Record: 0–4 (0–0 Southland)
- Head coach: Shane Heirman (4th season)
- Associate head coach: Dave Wojcik
- Assistant coaches: Pat Dame; Quentin Holder
- Home arena: McDermott Center

2026–27 Southland Conference men's basketball standings
	Conf.				Overall
Team	W		L	PCT	W		L	PCT
Houston Christian	0	–	0	–	4	–	0	1.000
Stephen F. Austin	0	–	0	–	3	–	1	.750
East Texas A&M	0	–	0	–	3	–	1	.750
Lamar	0	–	0	–	2	–	1	.667
LSU New Orleans	0	–	0	–	2	–	1	.667
McNeese	0	–	0	–	2	–	1	.667
UT Rio Grande Valley	0	–	0	–	2	–	2	.500
Texas A&M–Corpus Christi	0	–	0	–	2	–	2	.500
Nicholls	0	–	0	–	2	–	2	.500
Southeastern Louisiana	0	–	0	–	1	–	2	.333
Northwestern State	0	–	0	–	1	–	4	.200
Incarnate Word	0	–	0	–	0	–	4	.000
† 2027 Southland tournament winner As of November 16, 2026; Rankings from AP poll

The 2026–27 Incarnate Word Cardinals men's basketball team will represent the University of the Incarnate Word during the 2026–27 NCAA Division I men's basketball season. The Cardinals, who will be led by fourth-year head coach Shane Heirman, will play their home games at the McDermott Center in San Antonio, Texas as members of the Southland Conference.

== Previous season ==
The Cardinals finished the 2025–26 season 12–19, 7–15 in Southland play, to finish in a tie for ninth place. They failed to qualify for the Southland Conference tournament, as only the top eight teams qualify.

== Preseason ==
On October 20, 2026, the Southland Conference released their preseason poll. Incarnate Word was picked to finish 11th in the conference.

=== Preseason rankings ===
Southland Preseason Poll
Place	Team	Votes
1	McNeese	121 (11)
2	Stephen F. Austin	109
3	Texas A&M–Corpus Christi	98 (1)
4	Lamar	91
5	UT Rio Grande Valley	78
6	LSU New Orleans	68
7	Houston Christian	47
8	Northwestern State	45
9	Southeastern Louisiana	38
10	Nicholls	37
11	Incarnate Word	36
12	East Texas A&M	24
(#) first-place votes

== Roster ==
2026–27 Incarnate Word Cardinals men's basketball team
Players
Coaches

Pos.	#	Name	Height	Weight	Year	Previous school	Hometown
F	0	D'arrae Goodwin	6 ft 7 in (2.01 m)	205 lb (93 kg)	So	San Diego	Wheeling, West Virginia
G	1	Max Garcia-Plata	6 ft 4 in (1.93 m)	195 lb (88 kg)	RS Fr	Florida State	Madrid, Spain
G	3	Mekhi Connor	6 ft 1 in (1.85 m)	180 lb (82 kg)	Jr	Sacred Heart	New Haven, Connecticut
G	4	Ismail Habib	6 ft 0 in (1.83 m)	180 lb (82 kg)	Sr	Southern Indiana	Chicago, Illinois
G	6	Jayden Thomas	6 ft 5 in (1.96 m)	—	Jr	DeSales	Fogelsville, Pennsylvania
F	8	Krisnan-Cole Ioane	6 ft 6 in (1.98 m)	210 lb (95 kg)	Fr	Auckland Tuatara	Wellington, New Zealand
G	10	DJ Cason	6 ft 1 in (1.85 m)	165 lb (75 kg)	Jr	Colby Community College	Edmond, Oklahoma
F	11	Kaleb Spencer	6 ft 9 in (2.06 m)	225 lb (102 kg)	So	William & Mary	Manteo, North Carolina
G	12	Marc Harvey	6 ft 3 in (1.91 m)	170 lb (77 kg)	Fr	Oak Lawn High School	Chicago, Illinois
C	18	Christophe Pare	7 ft 0 in (2.13 m)	240 lb (109 kg)	Fr	Dawson College	L'Assomption, Quebec
F	21	Godswill Erheriene	6 ft 9 in (2.06 m)	225 lb (102 kg)	Jr	Seton Hall	Delta State, Nigeria
G	22	Drew Barbee	6 ft 5 in (1.96 m)	215 lb (98 kg)	Jr	Central Michigan	Memphis, Tennessee
G	24	Brandon McCreesh	6 ft 3 in (1.91 m)	190 lb (86 kg)	Sr	Bucknell	Lewisburg, Pennsylvania
F	25	David Emetu	6 ft 8 in (2.03 m)	205 lb (93 kg)	Jr	Monroe	Ohafia, Nigeria
F	35	Tristan Collins	6 ft 6 in (1.98 m)	180 lb (82 kg)	Fr	Harlan High School	San Antonio, Texas

Head coach

- Shane Heirman (Tulsa)

Assistant coach(es)

- Dave Wojcik (Loyola (MD))
- Pat Dame (Stony Brook)
- Quentin Holder (Central Michigan)

Legend

- (C) Team captain
- (S) Suspended
- (I) Ineligible
- (W) Walk-on
- Injured
- Current redshirt

Roster
Last update: October 28, 2026

== Schedule and results ==
Date time, TV	Rank^{#}	Opponent^{#}	Result	Record	High points	High rebounds	High assists	Site (attendance) city, state
Exhibition
October 2, 2026*; 6:00 pm		at Michigan State	L 59–89	–	20 – McCreesh	5 – Erheriene	8 – Connor	Breslin Center (14,797); East Lansing, MI
Regular season
November 2, 2026*; 8:00 pm		at Oklahoma State	L 60–91	0–1	18 – Connor	6 – Tied	3 – Connor	Gallagher-Iba Arena (4,576); Stillwater, OK
November 5, 2026*; 6:00 pm		Chicago State	L 54–66	0–2	18 – Erherine	10 – Erherine	5 – Connor	McDermott Center (235); San Antonio, TX
November 8, 2026*; 5:00 pm		at UTEP	L 60–79	0–3	16 – Goodwin	7 – Team	5 – Habib	Don Haskins Center (3,819); El Paso, TX
November 11, 2026*; 2:11 pm		at UC Davis	L 69–81	0–4	14 – Tied	11 – Erherine	9 – Connor	University Credit Union Center (1,977); Davis, CA
November 18, 2026*; 7:00 pm		at Texas State						Strahan Arena; San Marcos, TX
November 20, 2026*; 6:00 pm		Central Baptist						McDermott Center; San Antonio, TX
November 25, 2026*; 12:00 am		at Hawaiʻi						Stan Sheriff Center; Honolulu, HI
November 29, 2026*; 7:00 pm		at Grand Canyon						Global Credit Union Arena; Phoenix, AZ
December 5, 2026; 1:00 pm		at Southeastern Louisiana						Pride Roofing University Center; Hammond, LA
December 7, 2026; 6:30 pm		at McNeese						Townsley Law Arena; Lake Charles, LA
December 9, 2026*; 8:00 pm		at Gonzaga						McCarthey Athletic Center; Spokane, WA
December 15, 2026*; 6:30 pm		at Texas Tech						United Supermarkets Arena; Lubbock, TX
December 19, 2026; 4:00 pm		Nicholls						McDermott Center; San Antonio, TX
December 21, 2026; 11:00 am		LSU New Orleans						McDermott Center; San Antonio, TX
December 28, 2026*; 8:00 pm, truTV		at Arizona						McKale Center; Tucson, AZ
January 2, 2027; 3:30 pm		at Houston Christian						Sharp Gymnasium; Houston, TX
January 4, 2027; 6:00 pm		UT Rio Grande Valley						McDermott Center; San Antonio, TX
January 9, 2027; 4:00 pm		Lamar						McDermott Center; San Antonio, TX
January 11, 2027; 6:00 pm		Stephen F. Austin						McDermott Center; San Antonio, TX
January 16, 2027; 3:30 pm		at Northwestern State						Prather Coliseum; Natchitoches, LA
January 18, 2027; 1:00 pm		at East Texas A&M						The Field House; Commerce, TX
January 23, 2027; 3:30 pm		at Texas A&M–Corpus Christi						Hilliard Center; Corpus Christi, TX
January 26, 2027; 6:30 pm		at UT Rio Grande Valley						UTRGV Fieldhouse; Edinburg, TX
January 30, 2027; 4:00 pm		Texas A&M–Corpus Christi						McDermott Center; San Antonio, TX
February 1, 2027; 6:00 pm		Houston Christian						McDermott Center; San Antonio, TX
February 6, 2027; 4:00 pm		McNeese						McDermott Center; San Antonio, TX
February 8, 2027; 6:00 pm		Southeastern Louisiana						McDermott Center; San Antonio, TX
February 13, 2027; 3:00 pm		at Nicholls						Stopher Gymnasium; Thibodaux, LA
February 15, 2027; 6:30 pm		at LSU New Orleans						Lakefront Arena; New Orleans, LA
February 20, 2027; 4:00 pm		East Texas A&M						McDermott Center; San Antonio, TX
February 22, 2027; 6:00 pm		Northwestern State						McDermott Center; San Antonio, TX
February 27, 2027; 6:00 pm		at Lamar						Neches Arena; Beaumont, TX
March 1, 2027; 6:30 pm		at Stephen F. Austin						William R. Johnson Coliseum; Nacogdoches, TX
*Non-conference game. ^{#}Rankings from AP poll. (#) Tournament seedings in parentheses. All times are in Central.
