= 2026–27 Oklahoma State Cowboys basketball team =

American college basketball season

2026–27 Oklahoma State Cowboys basketball
- Conference: Big 12 Conference
- Record: 3–2 (0–0 Big 12)
- Head coach: Steve Lutz (3rd season)
- Associate head coach: James Miller
- Assistant coaches: Lou Gudino; Robert Guster; Keiton Page; Dana Valentine
- Home arena: Gallagher-Iba Arena

2026–27 Big 12 men's basketball standings
	Conf.				Overall
Team	W		L	PCT	W		L	PCT
No. 8 Houston	0	–	0	–	6	–	0	1.000
Arizona State	0	–	0	–	5	–	0	1.000
No. 21 BYU	0	–	0	–	5	–	0	1.000
No. 9 Texas Tech	0	–	0	–	5	–	0	1.000
No. 11 Kansas	0	–	0	–	5	–	1	.833
No. 12 Arizona	0	–	0	–	4	–	1	.800
Baylor	0	–	0	–	4	–	1	.800
Cincinnati	0	–	0	–	4	–	1	.800
TCU	0	–	0	–	4	–	1	.800
UCF	0	–	0	–	4	–	1	.800
Iowa State	0	–	0	–	3	–	1	.750
Kansas State	0	–	0	–	3	–	1	.750
West Virginia	0	–	0	–	4	–	2	.667
Oklahoma State	0	–	0	–	3	–	2	.600
Utah	0	–	0	–	3	–	2	.600
Colorado	0	–	0	–	2	–	3	.400
† 2027 Big 12 tournament winner As of November 21, 2026; Rankings from AP poll

The 2026–27 Oklahoma State Cowboys basketball team will represent Oklahoma State University during the 2026–27 NCAA Division I men's basketball season. The team is led by third-year head coach Steve Lutz, play their home games at Gallagher-Iba Arena located in Stillwater, Oklahoma as a member of the Big 12 Conference.

== Previous season ==
The Cowboys finished the 2025–26 season 20–15, 6–12 in Big 12 play, tied for 13th place and received the no. 14 seed in the Big 12 tournament. In the first round the Cowboys defeated no. 11 Colorado in their first round match up, 92–83. In their second round match-up Oklahoma State was defeated by TCU, 88–95. The Cowboys received a bid to the 2026 NIT tournament, where they were the no. 2 seed in the Tulsa Region. They defeated Davidson in the first round, 84–80. In their second-round matchup, the Cowboys were defeated by regional no. 3 seed Wichita State, 70–96.

== Offseason ==
=== Departures ===
Departures
Name	Number	Pos.	Height	Weight	Year	Hometown	Reason for departure
Arturo Dean	2	PG	5'11"	170	Sr.	Miami, FL	Elected to Transfer to UCF Knights
Jaylen Curry	0	PG	6'1"	180	Jr.	Charlotte, N.C.	Elected to Transfer to Virginia Tech
Robert Jennings	25	PF	6'7"	23	Sr.	Desoto, TX	Elected to Transfer to Maryland
Vyctorius Miller	5	SG	6'5"	190	So.	Los Angeles, CA	Elected to Transfer to Georgetown

=== Incoming transfers ===
Incoming transfers
Name	Number	Pos.	Height	Weight	Year	Hometown	Previous school

=== Recruiting class ===
==== 2026 recruiting class ====
College recruiting
Name	Hometown	School	Height	Weight	Commit date
			N/A	N/A	
Recruit ratings: (8)
Overall recruit ranking:
Note: In many cases, Scout, Rivals, 247Sports, On3, and ESPN may conflict in their listings of height and weight.; In these cases, the average was taken. ESPN grades are on a 100-point scale.; Sources: "2026 Team Ranking". Rivals.

== Preseason ==
The Big 12 preseason coaches & media poll will be released in October 2026. All awards will be voted on by the league's 16 head coaches, who can not vote for their own team or players.

Big 12 Preseason Coaches Poll

	Big 12 Coaches	Points
1.	Arizona	220 (12)
2.	Houston	214 (4)
3.	Kansas	186
4.	Iowa State	181
5.	Texas Tech	180
6.	BYU	148
7.	TCU	137
T8.	Cincinnati	116
T8.	West Virginia	116
10.	Baylor	102
11.	Oklahoma State	98
12.	Arizona State	75
13.	UCF	55
T14.	Colorado	34
T14.	Kansas State	34
16.	Utah	24
Reference: (#) first-place votes

Big 12 Preseason Media Poll

	Big 12 Coaches
1.	Arizona
2.	Houston
3.	Kansas
4.	Texas Tech
5.	Iowa State
6.	BYU
7.	Baylor
8.	TCU
9.	Cincinnati
10.	West Virginia
11.	Oklahoma State
12.	Arizona State
13.	UCF
14.	Kansas State
15.	Colorado
16.	Utah

All-Big 12 Preseason First team

Player	School	Pos.	Yr.	Ht., Wt.	Hometown (Last School)
Ivan Kharchenkov	Arizona	F	So.	6'7", 230	Munich, Germany (Bayern Munich)
Motiejus Krivas	Arizona	C	Jr.	7'2", 260	Siauliai, Lithuania (BC Žalgiris)
Paulius Murauskas	Arizona State	F	Sr.	6'8", 235	Kaunas, Lithuania (St. Mary's)
Robert Wright III†	BYU	G	Jr.	6'1", 183	Wilmington, DE (Baylor)
Dedan Thomas Jr.	Houston	G	Sr.	6'1", 180	Las Vegas, NV (LSU)
Joseph Tugler	Houston	F	Sr.	6'8", 230	Houston, TX (Cypress Falls HS)
Tamin Lipsey	Iowa State	G	GS	6'1", 200	Ames, IA (Ames HS)
Tyran Stokes	Kansas	G	Fr.	6'7", 230	Louisville, KY (Rainer Beach HS)
Xavier Edmonds	TCU	F	Sr.	6'8", 252	Long Beach, CA (Salt Lake CC)
JT Toppin†	Texas Tech	F	Sr.	6'9", 230	Dallas, TX (New Mexico)
† denotes unanimous selection Reference:

- Player of the Year: Motiejus Krivas, Arizona
- Co-Newcomer of the Year: Paulius Murauskas, Arizona State
- Freshman of the Year: Tyran Stokes, Kansas

=== Award watch lists ===
Listed in the order that they were released

Award	Player	Position	Year	Source

== Roster ==
2026–27 Oklahoma State Cowboys men's basketball team
Players
Coaches

Pos.	#	Name	Height	Weight	Year	Previous school	Hometown
G	1	Kanye Clary	6 ft 0 in (1.83 m)	190 lb (86 kg)	RS Sr	Mississippi State	Virginia Beach, VA
G	2	Anthony Felesi	6 ft 5 in (1.96 m)	205 lb (93 kg)	Fr	Utah Prep	Laie, HI
G	4	Kashie Natt	6 ft 3 in (1.91 m)	190 lb (86 kg)		Sam Houston	Rayville, LA
G	5	Parker Robinson	6 ft 4 in (1.93 m)	200 lb (91 kg)	Fr	Overtime Elite	New Market, MD
G	7	Jalen Montonati	6 ft 7 in (2.01 m)	180 lb (82 kg)	Fr	Owasso HS	Owasso, OK
F	8	Latrell Allmond	6 ft 8 in (2.03 m)	225 lb (102 kg)	Fr	Petersburg HS (VA)	Southern Pines, NC
F	13	Mekhi Ragland	6 ft 11 in (2.11 m)	330 lb (150 kg)	So	Sunrise Christian Academy (KS)	Lilburn, Georgia
F	14	Andrija Grbović	6 ft 11 in (2.11 m)	210 lb (95 kg)	So	Arizona State	Pljevlja, Montenegro
F	22	Parsa Fallah	6 ft 10 in (2.08 m)	250 lb (113 kg)		Oregon State	Amol, Iran
F	23	Benjamin Ahmed	6 ft 10 in (2.08 m)	275 lb (125 kg)	So	Putnam Science Academy (CT)	Kogi State, Nigeria
F	24	Ryan Crotty	6 ft 6 in (1.98 m)	215 lb (98 kg)	So	Miller School (VA)	Holly Springs, North Carolina
C	25	Julius Halaifonua	7 ft 0 in (2.13 m)	260 lb (118 kg)	Jr	NBA Academy Australia	Auckland, New Zealand
G	44	Luka Bogavac	6 ft 6 in (1.98 m)	215 lb (98 kg)	Sr	North Carolina	Mojkovac, Montenegro
G	55	Jacob Walker	6 ft 1 in (1.85 m)	185 lb (84 kg)	Sr	Sam Houston	Memphis, TN
F	99	Jordan Burks	6 ft 9 in (2.06 m)	205 lb (93 kg)	Sr	UCF	Decatur, AL

Head coach

- Steve Lutz (Texas Lutheran)

Assistant coach(es)

- James Miller (CSU Pueblo)
- Mike Ekanem (Texas Lutheran)
- Robert Guster (Missouri–Rolla)
- Keiton Page (Oklahoma State)
- Dana Valentine (Worcester State)

Legend

- (C) Team captain
- (S) Suspended
- (I) Ineligible
- (W) Walk-on
- (5Y) Fifth-year senior
- Injured
- Current redshirt

Roster
Last update: October 22, 2026

== Schedule and results ==
Date time, TV	Rank^{#}	Opponent^{#}	Result	Record	High points	High rebounds	High assists	Site (attendance) city, state
Puerto Rico Exhibition Tour (3–0)
July 26, 2026*; 7:00 p.m., YouTube		vs. Puerto Rico Fuerza; San Juan Summer Shootout	W 94–88	1–0	16 – Burks	8 – Grbović	3 – Tied	Guillermo Angulo Coliseum (NA); San Juan, P.R.
July 27, 2026*; 7:00 p.m., YouTube		vs. Puerto Rico Fuerza; San Juan Summer Shootout	W 120–92	2–0	18 – Robinson	7 – Allmond	4 – Bogavac	Guillermo Angulo Coliseum (NA); San Juan, P.R.
July 28, 2026*; 7:00 p.m., YouTube		vs. LBP All-Stars; San Juan Summer Shootout	W 100–92	3–0	18 – Burks	7 – Felsi	6 – Walker	Guillermo Angulo Coliseum (NA); San Juan, P.R.
Exhibition
October 11, 2026*; 2:00 p.m., NA		New Mexico	L 89–99		18 – Felesi	7 – Ahmed	4 – Clary	Gallagher-Iba Arena (NA); Stillwater, OK
October 23, 2026*; 2:30 p.m., NA		Tulsa	W 93–85		26 – Natt	12 – Natt	9 – Natt	Gallagher-Iba Arena (NA); Stillwater, OK
October 27, 2026*; 6:00 p.m., B1G+		at Wisconsin	L 65–82		16 – Halaifonua	8 – Natt	4 – Tied	Kohl Center (13,551); Madison, WI
Non-conference regular season
November 2, 2026*; 8:00 p.m., ESPN+		Incarnate Word	W 91–60	1–0	14 – Bogavac	4 – Tied	8 – Walker	Gallagher-Iba Arena (4,576); Stillwater, OK
November 6, 2026*; 8:00 p.m., ESPN+		Queens	W 118–68	2–0	17 – Grbović	7 – Burks	9 – Walker	Gallagher-Iba Arena (5,257); Stillwater, OK
November 12, 2026*; 7:00 p.m., SECN+		at Texas A&M	L 67–88	2–1	14 – Tied	7 – Felesi	5 – Walker	Reed Arena (8,606); College Station, TX
November 16, 2026*; 7:00 p.m., ESPN+		Central Arkansas	W 99–66	3–1	20 – Burks	9 – Allmond	6 – Walker	Gallagher-Iba Arena (4,323); Stillwater, OK
November 20, 2026*; 11:30 a.m., ESPN2		vs. Minnesota; Charleston Classic	L 70–85	3–2	22 – Natt	9 – Natt	4 – Walker	TD Arena (1,446); Charleston, SC
November 22, 2026*; 2:30 p.m., ESPN		vs. Virginia Tech; Charleston Classic						TD Arena; Charleston, SC
November 25, 2026*; 2:00 p.m., ESPN+		Jackson State						Gallagher-Iba Arena; Stillwater, OK
November 29, 2026*; 2:00 p.m., ESPN+		Tennessee State						Gallagher-Iba Arena; Stillwater, OK
December 2, 2026*; 7:00 p.m., ESPN+		Grand Canyon						Gallagher-Iba Arena; Stillwater, OK
December 5, 2026*; 2:15 p.m., TNT/TruTV		Saint Mary's						Gallagher-Iba Arena; Stillwater, OK
December 12, 2026*; 1:30 p.m., ESPN2		vs. Oklahoma; Bedlam Series						Paycom Center; Oklahoma City, OK
December 16, 2026*; 7:00 p.m., ESPN+		Oral Roberts						Gallagher-Iba Arena; Stillwater, OK
December 20, 2026*; 12:00 p.m., ESPN2/ESPNU		vs. Northwestern						BOK Center; Tulsa, OK
December 29, 2026*; 7:00 p.m., ESPN+		Houston Christian						Gallagher-Iba Arena; Stillwater, OK
Big 12 regular season
January 2, 2027; 7:00 p.m., CBSSN		Colorado						Gallagher-Iba Arena; Stillwater, OK
January 5, 2027; 5:00 p.m., CBSSN		at West Virginia						WVU Coliseum; Morgantown, WV
January 9, 2027; 1:00 p.m., FOX		at Iowa State						Hilton Coliseum; Ames, IA
January 12, 2027; 7:00 p.m., ESPN+		Utah						Gallagher-Iba Arena; Stillwater, OK
January 16, 2027; 1:00 p.m., ESPN2/ESPNU		at Baylor						Foster Pavilion; Waco, TX
January 23, 2027; 3:00 p.m., TNT/TruTV		TCU						Gallagher-Iba Arena; Stillwater, OK
January 27, 2027; 8:00 p.m., Peacock		Texas Tech						Gallagher-Iba Arena; Stillwater, OK
January 30, 2027; 11:30 a.m., FOX		at Kansas						Allen Fieldhouse; Lawrence, KS
February 3, 2027; 8:00 p.m., CBSSN		at Kansas State						Bramlage Coliseum; Manhattan, KS
February 6, 2027; 1:00 p.m., FS1		Cincinnati						Gallagher-Iba Arena; Stillwater, OK
February 10, 2027; 8:00 p.m., ESPN2/ESPNU		Iowa State						Gallagher-Iba Arena; Stillwater, OK
February 13, 2027; 7:30 p.m., CBSSN		at TCU						Schollmaier Arena; Fort Worth, TX
February 16, 2027; 8:00 p.m., ESPN/ESPN2		Arizona						Gallagher-Iba Arena; Stillwater, OK
February 21, 2027; 3:00 p.m., FS1		at Houston						Fertitta Center; Houston, TX
February 24, 2027; 7:30 p.m., CBSSN		UCF						Gallagher-Iba Arena; Stillwater, OK
February 27, 2027; 6:00 p.m., ESPN+		at Utah						Jon M. Huntsman Center; Salt Lake City, UT
March 2, 2027; 8:00 p.m., ESPN/ESPN2		at BYU						Marriott Center; Provo, UT
March 6, 2027; 4:00 p.m., NBCSN/Peacock		Arizona State						Gallagher-Iba Arena; Stillwater, OK
Big 12 tournament
March 9–13, 2027; TBD, ESPN+/ESPN		vs. TBD; First Round						T-Mobile Center; Kansas City, MO
*Non-conference game. ^{#}Rankings from AP poll. (#) Tournament seedings in parentheses. All times are in Central Time.

== Rankings ==
Ranking movements Legend: — = Not ranked
	Week																				
Poll	Pre	1	2	3	4	5	6	7	8	9	10	11	12	13	14	15	16	17	18	19	Final
AP	—	—																			
Coaches	—	—																			
