= Darion Brown =

American basketball coach

Current position
- Title: Head coach
- Team: Nicholls Colonels
- Conference: Southland
- Record: 0–0

Playing career
- 2014–2018: Our Lady of the Lake

Coaching career (HC unless noted)
- 2018–2019: Salem (graduate assistant)
- 2021–2023: Nicholls (assistant)
- 2023–2024: Jacksonville (assistant)
- 2024–2026: Texas A&M Texarkana
- 2026–present: Nicholls

Administrative career (AD unless noted)
- 2020–2021: South Alabama (director of recruiting)

Head coaching record
- Overall: 0–0 (–)

Darion Brown is an American college basketball coach who is currently the head coach of the Nicholls Colonels.

== Playing career ==
Brown played college basketball at Our Lady of the Lake University for four seasons, totaling 1,116 points, 551 assists, 270 rebounds, and 189 steals. During his playing career he earned two All-Red River Athletic Conference Second Team selections.

== Coaching career ==
Brown got his first career coaching job in 2018, joining Salem University as a graduate assistant. After one season at Salem, he was hired as director of recruiting at South Alabama. Ahead of the 2021 season, Brown was hired as an assistant coach at Nicholls. In 2023, he was hired as an assistant coach for Jacksonville. Before the 2024 season, he got his first head coaching job at Texas A&M Texarkana. On June 30, 2026, Brown was hired to serve as the next head coach for the Nicholls Colonels.
