= College of Biblical Studies =

Bible college in Houston, Texas

Coordinates: 29.7166°N 95.5065°W

College of Biblical Studies–Houston
- Former name: Houston Bible Institute
- Type: Private nonprofit Bible college
- Established: 1979
- Religious affiliation: Nondenominational Evangelical Dispensationalist
- Academic affiliations: ABHE, SACSCOC
- President: William W. Blocker
- Undergraduates: 460
- Location: Houston, Texas, United States
- Sporting affiliations: NCCAA
- Website: www.cbshouston.edu

The College of Biblical Studies–Houston is a private nonprofit nondenominational evangelical coed Bible college located in Houston, Texas. The school was founded as the Houston Bible & Vocational Institute in 1976. The school offers classes online and at three campus locations in Houston; Indianapolis, Indiana; and Fort Wayne, Indiana. Its mission is, “to glorify God by educating and equipping multi-ethnic Christian leaders to impact the world for Christ.” In 2008, the college had 1,399 students. However, by 2019, the college had 460 students, with 134 of them being full-time. In 2007, 51% of students were African-American, and 23% were Hispanic. In 2019, 47% of the students were black, 24% Hispanic, 17% white, and 8% Asian.

== History ==
Houston Bible Institute was started by Rev. Ernest L. Mays with a particular focus on inner-city minority groups. It was incorporated as Houston Bible & Vocational Institute in 1976, but a decision was made to focus on biblical and theological training, since adequate resources for vocational training were believed to exist in the area.

In the fall of 1979, Houston Bible Institute offered its first classes, using the facilities of KHCB-FM (a Christian radio station in Houston) for its classrooms and leasing administrative space nearby. Rev. Rodney L. Cooper was the school's first executive director. In 1983, Rev. Cooper resigned to study for a Ph.D., and Rev. Jack Arrington, formerly vice president, became president. In 1991, Rev. Arrington left the college, and Dr. William Boyd was hired to replace him. Under Boyd's leadership, the college grew through a scholarship program, the Texas Higher Education Coordinating Board certified the school as a college (in 1996), the name was changed from "Houston Bible Institute" to "College of Biblical Studies–Houston," and a collaboration was established with Dallas Theological Seminary.

In 1994, a campus located near Hillcroft and the Southwest Freeway was purchased. In 1999, the college became nationally accredited through the Accrediting Association of Bible Colleges (now the Association for Biblical Higher Education). In July 2007, Dr. Jay A. Quine became president, with Boyd becoming Chancellor. In January 2013, the College of Biblical Studies-Houston became accredited with the Southern Association of Colleges and Schools Commission on Colleges to award up to baccalaureate degrees. In July 2012, Dr. William Blocker became president. As president, he stated his goal to continue the impact of the college on families, churches and communities. In 2013, the college was granted membership into the Southern Association of Colleges and Schools (SACSCOC) and was reaffirmed in its national accreditation with Association of Biblical Higher Education (ABHE).

In 2019, the school merged with Crossroads Bible College in Indianapolis. This resulted in the acquisition of the Grace Relations ministry which equips pastors and other Christian workers to bridge racial, ethnic, and cultural divides.

== Courses ==
The college offers degree programs online and on campus which include an Associate of Biblical Studies taught in English and Spanish, and Bachelor of Science degree programs with majors in Biblical Studies, Biblical Counseling, Organizational Leadership, Christian Leadership, and Women's Ministry. In 2020, the College of Biblical Studies established the Emerging Leaders Scholarship, a scholarship program designed to address the father absence epidemic in communities around the nation by for educating, mentoring, and supporting young men 17 – 30 who have grown up without a positive father figure in the home.

== Theological position ==
The college is nondenominational and evangelical, and more specifically dispensational, premillennial, and non-charismatic. Its "doctrinal statement" includes the premillennial belief that the "imminent return of the Lord [...] is to be followed in order by: the tribulation; the establishment of the reign of Christ on earth for one thousand years; the eternal state of punishment for the unsaved and the eternal state of blessing for the saved."

== Accreditation ==
CBS is accredited by the Association for Biblical Higher Education and by the Southern Association of Colleges and Schools Commission on Colleges to award up to baccalaureate degrees.

== Sports ==
In 2022, the College of Biblical Studies began its first sports endeavor by joining the National Christian College Athletics Association (NCCAA) as a Division II member in the Southwest Region for men's & women's basketball. On January 2, 2024, during the first year of the CBS women's basketball program, the team lost a game to the Grambling State Tigers with a score of 159–18, which set a record for the biggest margin of loss in Division I women’s basketball at 141 points.
