= McDermott Center =

Arena in San Antonio, Texas

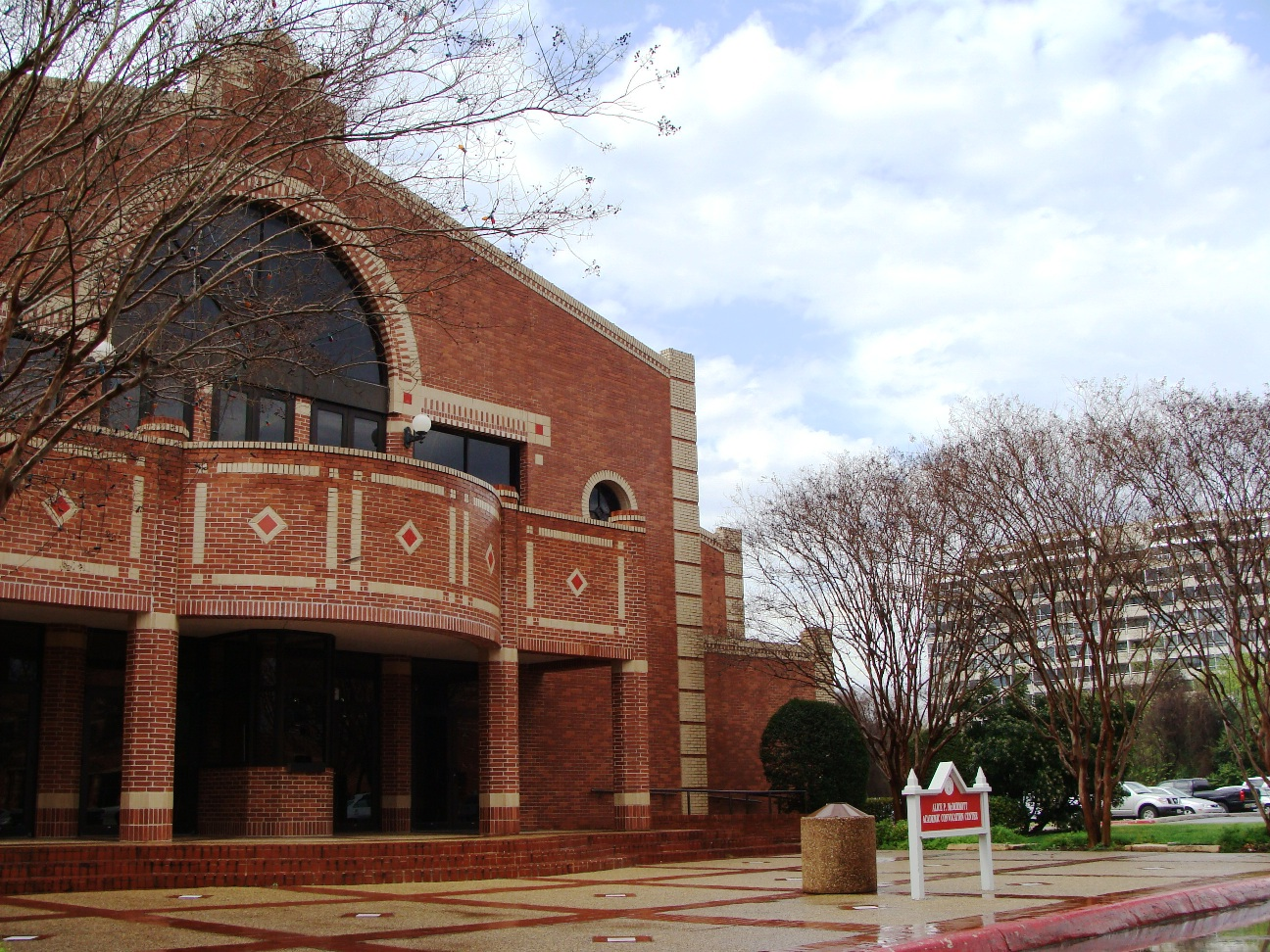
- Interactive map of McDermott Center
- Full name: Alice P. McDermott Convocation Center
- Location: San Antonio, Texas
- Coordinates: 29°28′05.3″N 98°28′09.9″W
- Owner: University of the Incarnate Word
- Operator: University of the Incarnate Word
- Capacity: 2,000

Construction
- Opened: 1989

Tenants
- Incarnate Word Cardinals men's basketball Incarnate Word Cardinals women's basketball Incarnate Word Cardinals women's volleyball

The McDermott Center is a 2,000-seat multi-purpose arena in San Antonio, Texas on the campus of the University of the Incarnate Word. Built in 1989, it is home to the Incarnate Word Cardinals men's and women's basketball teams and the women's volleyball team.

== See also ==
- List of NCAA Division I basketball arenas
