= Texas A&M–Corpus Christi Islanders men's basketball statistical leaders =

The Texas A&M–Corpus Christi Islanders men's basketball statistical leaders are individual statistical leaders of the Texas A&M–Corpus Christi Islanders men's basketball program in various categories, including points, assists, blocks, rebounds, and steals. Within those areas, the lists identify single-game, single-season, and career leaders. The Islanders represent Texas A&M University–Corpus Christi in the NCAA's Southland Conference.

Texas A&M–Corpus Christi began competing in intercollegiate basketball in 1999. These lists are updated through the end of the 2020–21 season.

== Scoring ==
Career
Rk	Player	Points	Seasons
1	Rashawn Thomas	2033	2013–14 2014–15 2015–16 2016–17
2	John Jordan	1576	2011–12 2012–13 2013–14 2014–15
3	Chris Daniels	1407	2004–05 2005–06 2006–07 2007–08
4	Michael Hicks	1324	1999–00 2000–01
5	Brian Evans	1274	2000–01 2001–02 2002–03 2003–04
6	Demond Watt	1272	2007–08 2008–09 2009–10 2010–11
7	Travis Bailey	1268	2001–02 2002–03 2003–04 2004–05
8	Justin Reynolds	1242	2007–08 2008–09 2009–10 2010–11
9	Kevin Palmer	1230	2008–09 2009–10
10	Joseph Kilgore	1212	2014–15 2015–16 2016–17 2017–18

Season
Rk	Player	Points	Season
1	Rashawn Thomas	765	2016–17
2	Michael Hicks	748	2000–01
3	Kevin Palmer	631	2009–10
4	Ehab Amin	609	2016–17
5	Kevin Palmer	599	2008–09
6	Michael Hicks	576	1999–00
7	Trevian Tennyson	551	2022–23
8	Rashawn Thomas	548	2015–16
9	Joseph Kilgore	540	2017–18
10	John Jordan	532	2014–15

Single game
Rk	Player	Points	Season	Opponent
1	Michael Hicks	47	2000–01	Cal Poly
2	Michael Hicks	40	2000–01	Cal Poly
3	Michael Hicks	37	2000–01	UT-Pan American
4	Joseph Kilgore	36	2017–18	Houston Baptist
5	Rashawn Thomas	34	2016–17	Houston Baptist
	Rashawn Thomas	34	2015–16	Houston Baptist
	Michael Hicks	34	2000–01	Belmont
	Chris Daniels	34	2006–07	Central Arkansas
9	Michael Hicks	33	1999–00	Schreiner
	Michael Hicks	33	2000–01	Texas
	Michael Hicks	33	2000–01	Texas Tech
	Michael Hicks	33	2000–01	Portland State

== Rebounds ==
Career
Rk	Player	Rebounds	Seasons
1	Rashawn Thomas	961	2013–14 2014–15 2015–16 2016–17
2	Demond Watt	851	2007–08 2008–09 2009–10 2010–11
3	Corey Lamkin	842	2001–02 2002–03 2003–04 2004–05
4	Justin Reynolds	777	2007–08 2008–09 2009–10 2010–11
5	Chris Daniels	681	2004–05 2005–06 2006–07 2007–08
6	Isaac Mushila	676	2021–22 2022–23
7	Elijah Schmidt	540	2016–17 2017–18 2018–19 2019–20
8	Garry Clark	527	2023–24 2024–25
9	John Jordan	519	2011–12 2012–13 2013–14 2014–15
10	De'Lazarus Keys	505	2020–21 2021–22 2022–23

Season
Rk	Player	Rebounds	Season
1	Isaac Mushila	346	2022–23
2	Isaac Mushila	330	2021–22
3	Rashawn Thomas	305	2016–17
4	Demond Watt	275	2010–11
5	Garry Clark	266	2023–24
6	Rashawn Thomas	265	2015–16
7	Rashawn Thomas	262	2014–15
8	Garry Clark	261	2024–25
9	Zane Knowles	257	2013–14
10	Demond Watt	250	2009–10

Single game
Rk	Player	Rebounds	Season	Opponent
1	Corey Lamkin	21	2001–02	UT-Pan American
2	Rashawn Thomas	19	2015–16	Texas State
3	Corey Lamkin	18	2003–04	Air Force
	Zane Knowles	18	2013–14	Huston-Tillotson
5	Elijah Schmidt	17	2017–18	Our Lady of the Lake
	Damian Kirkaldy	17	1999–00	Beth
	Corey Lamkin	17	2002–03	Savannah State
	Zane Knowles	17	2013–14	Houston Baptist
	Isaac Mushila	17	2021–22	UTSA
	Isaac Mushila	17	2021–22	McNeese State
	Isaac Mushila	17	2021–22	Houstin Baptist
	Isaac Mushila	17	2022–23	Trinity University (TX)
	Isaac Mushila	17	2022–23	Texas A&M-Commerce
	Sheldon Williams	17	2025–26	SMU

== Assists ==
Career
Rk	Player	Assists	Seasons
1	John Jordan	652	2011–12 2012–13 2013–14 2014–15
2	Brian Evans	493	2000–01 2001–02 2002–03 2003–04
3	Hameed Ali	363	2011–12 2012–13 2013–14 2014–15 2015–16
4	Taurean Mitchell	350	2003–04 2004–05 2005–06 2006–07
5	Josh Ervin	311	2003–04 2004–05 2005–06 2006–07
6	Terrion Murdix	303	2021–22 2022–23
7	Myles Smith	293	2017–18 2018–19 2019–20 2020–21 2021–22
8	Travis Bailey	265	2001–02 2002–03 2003–04 2004–05
9	Jalen Jackson	211	2021–22 2022–23
10	Terence Jones	209	2009–10 2010–11 2011–12

Season
Rk	Player	Assists	Season
1	John Jordan	178	2014–15
2	John Jordan	177	2013–14
3	Hameed Ali	174	2015–16
4	Terrion Murdix	168	2022–23
5	John Jordan	159	2012–13
6	John Jordan	138	2011–12
7	Terrion Murdix	135	2021–22
8	Brian Evans	132	2002–03
9	Taurean Mitchell	131	2006–07
10	Brian Evans	125	2000–01

Single game
Rk	Player	Assists	Season	Opponent
1	Terrion Murdix	15	2022–23	Nicholls
2	Hameed Ali	12	2015–16	Northwestern State
	Myles Smith	12	2020–21	Our Lady of the Lake
4	Joseph Kilgore	11	2017–18	Houton Baptist
	Sennai Atsbeha	11	2000–01	North Texas
	Taurean Mitchell	11	2006–07	Stephen F. Austin
	John Jordan	11	2012–13	Lamar
	John Jordan	11	2014–15	Northwestern State
9	Toby Thomson	10	1999–00	Belmont
	Brian Evans	10	2002–03	Sam Houston State
	Taurean Mitchell	10	2004–05	Central Baptist
	Josh Ervin	10	2006–07	Lamar
	Terence Jones	10	2010–11	UT Arlington
	John Jordan	10	2011–12	UTSA
	John Jordan	10	2014–15	Incarnate Word
	Terrion Murdix	10	2021–22	Texas Lutheran
	Sheldon Williams	10	2024–25	Southwest Adventist

== Steals ==
Career
Rk	Player	Steals	Seasons
1	Ehab Amin	218	2014–15 2015–16 2016–17
2	Hameed Ali	193	2011–12 2012–13 2013–14 2014–15 2015–16
3	John Jordan	182	2011–12 2012–13 2013–14 2014–15
4	Kevin Palmer	163	2008–09 2009–10
5	Taurean Mitchell	147	2003–04 2004–05 2005–06 2006–07
6	Terrion Murdix	136	2021–22 2022–23
7	Travis Bailey	127	2001–02 2002–03 2003–04 2004–05
	Jake Kocher	127	2011–12 2013–14 2015–16 2016–17
9	Josh Ervin	124	2003–04 2004–05 2005–06 2006–07
10	Brian Evans	120	2000–01 2001–02 2002–03 2003–04

Season
Rk	Player	Steals	Season
1	Ehab Amin	124	2016–17
2	Hameed Ali	88	2015–16
3	Kevin Palmer	86	2008–09
4	Kevin Palmer	77	2009–10
5	Terrion Murdix	71	2022–23
6	Terrion Murdix	65	2021–22
7	John Jordan	63	2014–15
8	Ehab Amin	59	2015–16
	Jake Kocher	59	2016–17
10	Brian Hamilton	56	2001–02
	Michael Hicks	56	1999–00

Single game
Rk	Player	Steals	Season	Opponent
1	Kevin Palmer	7	2008–09	Georgia
	Jake Kocher	7	2016–17	UMBC
	Ehab Amin	7	2016–17	Fort Wayne
	Ehab Amin	7	2016–17	St. Mary's
	Terrion Murdix	7	2022–23	UTSA
6	Ehab Amin	6	2015–16	New Orleans
	Hameed Ali	6	2015–16	Houston Baptist
	C.J. McBride	6	2000–01	Sul Ross State
	Lee Denmon III	6	2000–01	Birmingham Southern
	Michael Hicks	6	2000–01	Centenary
	Armond Wainwright	6	2000–01	Belmont
	Jake Kocher	6	2013–14	New Orleans

== Blocks ==
Career
Rk	Player	Blocks	Seasons
1	Rashawn Thomas	217	2013–14 2014–15 2015–16 2016–17
2	Chris Daniels	170	2004–05 2005–06 2006–07 2007–08
3	Demond Watt	137	2007–08 2008–09 2009–10 2010–11
4	Nate Maxey	105	2011–12 2012–13
5	Justin Reynolds	97	2007–08 2008–09 2009–10 2010–11
6	Thomas Bailey	86	2001–02 2002–03 2003–04 2004–05
7	Filip Toncinic	77	2007–08 2008–09 2009–10
8	Perry Francois	61	2016–17 2017–18 2019–20 2020–21
	Elijah Schmidt	61	2016–17 2017–18 2018–19 2019–20
10	Corey Lamkin	60	2001–02 2002–03 2003–04 2004–05

Season
Rk	Player	Blocks	Season
1	Rashawn Thomas	75	2015–16
2	Rashawn Thomas	69	2016–17
3	Nate Maxey	57	2012–13
4	Chris Daniels	53	2006–07
5	Chris Daniels	49	2007–08
	Thomas Bailey	49	2004–05
7	Nate Maxey	48	2011–12
8	Chris Daniels	42	2005–06
9	Rashawn Thomas	40	2014–15
	Demond Watt	40	2010–11

Single game
Rk	Player	Blocks	Season	Opponent
1	Nate Maxey	9	2012–13	Houston
2	Rashawn Thomas	7	2015–16	Southeastern Louisiana
	Demond Watt	7	2009–10	Monmouth
	Nate Maxey	7	2011–12	McNeese State
5	Rashawn Thomas	6	2016–17	Jarvis Christian
	Pathe Diene	6	2000–01	Winthrop
	Thomas Bailey	6	2004–05	Huston-Tillotson
	Nate Maxey	6	2012–13	Oral Roberts
	Zane Knowles	6	2013–14	Houston Baptist
	Rashawn Thomas	6	2014–15	New Orleans
