= 2024–25 Le Moyne Dolphins men's basketball team =

College basketball team season

2024–25 Le Moyne Dolphins men's basketball
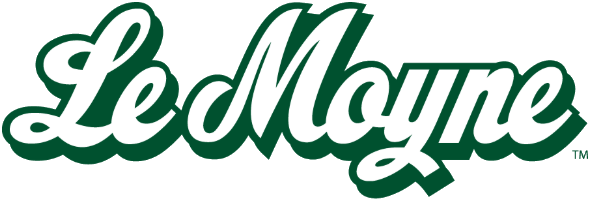
- Conference: Northeast Conference
- Record: 9–23 (4–12 NEC)
- Head coach: Nate Champion (fifth (Note: Le Moyne did not play during the 2020–21 season due to the COVID-19 pandemic. Consequently, this was Champion's sixth year as the team's head coach but only his fifth season.) season)
- Assistant coaches: Ben Swank (fourth season); Ben Marello (third season); Elijah Burns (first season)
- Captain: Robby Carmody
- Home arena: Le Moyne Events Center (capacity: 2,000); DeWitt, New York (Note: The campus, including the Le Moyne Events Center, has a Syracuse mailing address but lies primarily within the adjacent town of DeWitt.)

Uniform
| Home | Away |

2024–25 Northeast Conference men's basketball standings
| | Conf. | | | | Overall |
| Team | W | | L | PCT | W | | L | PCT |
|---|---|---|---|---|---|---|---|---|
| Central Connecticut | 14 | – | 2 | .875 | 25 | – | 7 | .781 |
| LIU | 12 | – | 4 | .750 | 17 | – | 16 | .515 |
| Mercyhurst ** | 9 | – | 7 | .563 | 15 | – | 16 | .484 |
| Saint Francis † | 8 | – | 8 | .500 | 16 | – | 18 | .471 |
| Fairleigh Dickinson | 8 | – | 8 | .500 | 13 | – | 20 | .394 |
| Stonehill * | 7 | – | 9 | .438 | 15 | – | 17 | .469 |
| Wagner | 6 | – | 10 | .375 | 14 | – | 16 | .467 |
| Chicago State | 4 | – | 12 | .250 | 4 | – | 28 | .125 |
| Le Moyne * | 4 | – | 12 | .250 | 9 | – | 23 | .281 |
† 2025 NEC tournament winner * ineligible for the 2025 NCAA tournament due to transition from Division II ** ineligible for both the 2025 NEC tournament and the 2025 NCAA tournament due to transition from Division II

The 2024–25 Le Moyne Dolphins men's basketball team represented Le Moyne College during the 2024–25 NCAA Division I men's basketball season. The Dolphins, led by fifth-season head coach Nate Champion, played their home games on Ted Grant Court in the Le Moyne Events Center in DeWitt, New York as second-year members of the Northeast Conference (NEC) and NCAA Division I. This was the 76th season of Le Moyne Dolphins men's basketball.

This was the second season of Le Moyne's transition to Division I. Consequently, the team was ineligible for NCAA postseason play.

The Dolphins finished the season 9–23, losing in the NEC quarterfinals. AJ Dancler was named second-team All-NEC. Dwayne Koroma led the NEC in field-goal shooting percentage at 71.4%.

== Previous season ==
The Dolphins finished the 2023–24 season 15–17, 9–7 in NEC play, tied for fourth place. As the no. 4 seed in the NEC tournament, they defeated Fairleigh Dickinson in the quarterfinals, before falling to Merrimack in the semifinals.

== Offseason ==
Following the 2023–24 season, Le Moyne lost Luke Sutherland, Kaiyem Cleary, Mike DePersia, Nate McClure and Isaiah Salter, who graduated. Sutherland and Cleary were the team's top two scorers, Cleary led the team in rebounds, and DePersia was the starting point guard, leading the team in assists and steals. DePersia remained with the team, becoming its director of basketball operations.

Victor Panov, a 6'7" power forward from Saint Petersburg, Russia committed to Le Moyne on November 20, 2023. However, he decommitted on April 10, 2024. Later that month, Panov committed to Drexel.

C.J. Moore entered the transfer portal on March 18, 2024. Jamel Melvin, who was injured and redshirted the previous season, entered the transfer portal on March 26. After redshirting the previous season, Mason Landdeck transferred to Seattle Pacific on April 3.

On May 8, Le Moyne announced that Jakob Blakley and Isaac Nyakundi had signed letters of intent. Blakley was a 6'0" guard, who was a first team all-conference, second team all-city and second-team all-state high school player, scoring more than 1,000 career points. As a senior at Walter Payton College Preparatory High School in Chicago, he averaged 28 points, 4.5 rebounds and four assists per game. Nyakundi was from Duluth, Minnesota but attended the MacDuffie School in Granby, Massachusetts, where he was a two-year captain. As a senior, he averaged 18 points and 13 rebounds per game. As a junior, he recorded 20 double-doubles.

On June 20, assistant coach Jamie Young left Le Moyne to become an assistant at Villanova. On the same day, Le Moyne announced that Elijah Burns had been hired as an assistant coach. Burns was an assistant at Saint Rose during the 2023–24 season.

Le Moyne announced that six transfer students were added to the team on July 23. These were guards Will Amica from Albany and Robby Carmody from Mercer, redshirt junior forward Dwayne Koroma from UT Arlington, junior forward Freds Pauls Bagatskis, also from UT Arlington, junior guard Zek Tekin from Siena and redshirt freshman forward Trevor Roe from Radford.

Will Amica was at Albany for four years, appearing in 29 games. He was enrolled at Le Moyne as a graduate student with at least two years of eligibility remaining. Amica played in 19 games off the bench during the 2023–24 season.

Robby Carmody began his collegiate career at Notre Dame before transferring to Mercer for the 2023–24 season. He had one year of eligibility remaining. Carmody played in 29 games with 19 starts for Mercer during the 2023–24 season, averaging 7.5 points in 17.4 minutes per contest.

After starting his collegiate career playing for Iona and then Salt Lake Community College, Dwayne Koroma spent the previous season at UT Arlington. He had two seasons of eligibility remaining. Koroma played in 33 games with 14 starts during the 2023–24 campaign.

Freds Pauls Bagatskis played for Latvia at the 2023 FIBA U20 European Championship Division B and averaged a team-high 17.3 points per game and led all players in the tournament with 27 three-point field goals. He has at least two years of eligibility remaining. Bagatskis started his collegiate career at Georgia Tech before transferring to UT Arlington for his sophomore year and becoming Dwayne Koroma's teammate. He played only two games during the 2023–24 season, before suffering an ankle injury in practice that ended his campaign.

Zek Tekin had two seasons of eligibility remaining after playing two seasons for Siena. Tekin played in 23 games with 20 starts as a sophomore during the 2023–24 season, averaging nine points, a team-high three assists, a team-high 1.1 steals and 2.1 rebounds in 23.3 minutes per game.

Trevor Roe, who was a 1,000-point scorer and an All-Central New York honoree at Fayetteville–Manlius High School, returned to the Syracuse metropolitan area after spending his freshman season at Radford in 2023–24, and had four seasons of eligibility remaining. Roe's father, Matt, played basketball at Syracuse from 1986 to 1989. The younger Roe scored 500 points as a high school senior and earned first team all-league and All-Central New York first honors. Roe missed the entire 2024–25 season with an injury.

The Dolphins also announced that Sam Donnelly, a graduate student at Le Moyne, who was a practice player with the Le Moyne women's team the previous two seasons, had been added to the roster.

=== Departures ===
Le Moyne departures
| Name | No. | Pos. | Height | Weight | 2023–24 class | Hometown | Reason for departure |
|---|---|---|---|---|---|---|---|
| Kaiyem Cleary | 2 | G | 6'6" | 185 | Grad student | Manchester, England | Graduated; undrafted in 2024 NBA draft; signed with Hyères-Toulon |
| Mike DePersia | 3 | G | 5'11" | 175 | Grad student | Cherry Hill, NJ | Graduated; became Le Moyne men's basketball director of basketball operations |
| Mason Landdeck | 4 | G | 6'2" | 170 | Junior (redshirted) | Cashmere, WA | Transferred to Seattle Pacific |
| Nate McClure | 35 | G | 6'4" | 190 | Grad student | Houston, TX | Graduated |
| Jamel Melvin | 10 | F | 6'11" | 210 | Junior (redshirted) | Upper Marlboro, MD | Entered transferred portal |
| C.J. Moore | 14 | G | 5'8" | 160 | Sophomore | Lancaster, NY | Entered transferred portal |
| Isaiah Salter | 5 | G | 6'0" | 160 | Grad student | Charlotte, NC | Graduated |
| Luke Sutherland | 23 | F | 6'7" | 220 | Grad student | Syracuse, NY | Graduated; undrafted in 2024 NBA draft; signed with Hawke's Bay Hawks |

=== Additions ===
==== Incoming transfers ====
Le Moyne incoming transfers
| Name | No. | Pos. | Height | Weight | 2024–25 class | Hometown | Previous school | Years rem. | Date comm. |
|---|---|---|---|---|---|---|---|---|---|
| Will Amica | 22 | G | 6'0" | 170 | Graduate | Syracuse, NY | Albany | 2 | June 10, 2024 |
| Freds Pauls Bagatskis | 12 | F | 6'8" | 180 | Junior | Riga, Latvia | UT Arlington | 2 | June 1, 2024 |
| Robby Carmody | 11 | G | 6'4" | 195 | Graduate | Mars, PA | Mercer | 1 | May 31, 2024 |
| Dwayne Koroma | 3 | F | 6'8" | 205 | (redshirt) Junior | Berlin, Germany | UT Arlington | 2 | June 7, 2024 |
| Trevor Roe | 5 | F | 6'8" | 205 | (redshirt) Freshman | Syracuse, NY | Radford | 4 | June 4, 2024 |
| Zek Tekin | 4 | G | 6'2" | 170 | Junior | Istanbul, Türkiye | Siena | 2 | May 31, 2024 |

==== 2024 recruiting class ====
Le Moyne incoming recruits
| Name | Number | Pos. | Height | Weight | Hometown | High school | RPS† |
|---|---|---|---|---|---|---|---|
| Jakob Blakley | 10 | G | 6'0" | 170 | Elgin, IL | Walter Payton Prep | 2.59 |
| Sam Donnelly (Note: Graduate student who did not play college basketball as an undergraduate. Donnelly had only one year of eligibility remaining.) | 33 | F | 6'2" | 200 | Vernon, NY | Vernon-Verona-Sherrill | — |
| Isaac Nyakundi | 13 | F | 6'9" | 220 | Duluth, MN | MacDuffie | 2.87 |
† Verbal Commits Recruitment Power Score on a scale of 0 to 5

==== 2025 recruiting class ====
2025 Le Moyne incoming recruits signed during the season
| Name | Number | Pos. | Height | Weight | Hometown | High school | RPS† |
|---|---|---|---|---|---|---|---|
| Eli Greenberg | 3 | PG | 6'4" | 165 | Centerville, OH | Centerville | 2.77 |
| Josiah Lee | 11 | G | 6'2" | 165 | Snohomish, WA | Glacier Peak | 2.45 |
† Verbal Commits Recruitment Power Score on a scale of 0 to 5

== Preseason polls ==
=== Northeast Conference poll ===
The Northeast Conference released its preseason coaches' poll on October 24, 2024. The Dolphins were picked to finish fourth in the conference.

| Rank | Team |
|---|---|
| 1 (tie) | Central Connecticut (5) |
| 1 (tie) | Wagner (4) |
| 3 | Fairleigh Dickinson |
| 4 | Le Moyne |
| 5 | LIU |
| 6 | Chicago State |
| 7 | Mercyhurst |
| 8 (tie) | Saint Francis |
| 8 (tie) | Stonehill |

(#) first-place votes

=== KenPom rating ===
Le Moyne was ranked 335th of 364 Division I teams in the preseason Pomeroy ratings.

=== Preseason all-conference team ===
Fifth-year senior guard Darrick Jones Jr. was the only Dolphin selected as a member of the NEC Preseason All-Conference Team.

== Season highlights ==
=== New uniforms ===
The Dolphins debuted new uniform designs. The small caps lettering of the school's name across the jersey was replaced by script lettering in white outlined in green on the home white jerseys. On the green road jerseys, the lettering is green outlined in white. Gold piping on both the jerseys and the shorts, home and away, was removed, and the uniforms became wholly green and white. Double piping is used around the sleeves, neckline, bottom of the shorts and waistband. The team's swimming dolphin logo was added to the front right side of the shorts. The outline of the dolphin is green on the white uniforms and white on the green uniforms.

=== Pre-conference season ===
The Dolphins traveled just over three miles for their season opener at Syracuse on November 4, 2024. Le Moyne shocked the Orange by holding them to 32% shooting from the floor in the first half and led by five points at intermission. With the Dolphins leading by a point, a 9–0 Syracuse run gave the Orange a 76–68 lead with 4:31 to play. However, Le Moyne responded with a 6–2 spurt, getting three points each from Will Amica on a triple and Freds Pauls Bagatskis on three free throws. Trent Mosquera's three-pointer cut the Syracuse lead to two points with 1:02 left, and another triple from Bagatskis made it 83–82 with 22 seconds on the clock. After the Orange hit one of two from the line, the Dolphins turned the ball over with six seconds to play, and Syracuse hit two more free throws, handing Le Moyne a heartbreaking 86–82 loss. Bagatskis scored 18 points to lead five Dolphins in double figures and had a team-high five rebounds. Zek Tekin had 10 points, four rebounds, a game-high six assists and a steal.

Will Amica and Zek Tekin were named NEC Prime Performers for the first week of the season. Amica averaged 14 points, 5.5 rebounds and 1.5 assists per game and shot 52.6% from the floor and 83.3% from three-point range. He came off the bench to score 12 points in 13 minutes on 5-for-9 shooting from the field and 2-for-2 from beyond the arc at Syracuse. He was 3-for-4 on three-pointers in a 16-point, eight-rebound performance against Cal State Northridge. Tekin averaged 12.7 points, three rebounds, 5.3 assists and two steals per game, shooting 64.7% from the field. He led the Dolphins with 17 points, including a 10-for-12 mark from the free-throw line, against Cal State Northridge.

The Dolphins visited two-time defending national champion UConn, ranked no. 3 in the AP poll, on November 13. Le Moyne took an early 7–4 lead in the first 2:42 of the game, but UConn responded with a 10–0 run. The Dolphins got back within three points, but another first-half 10–0 spurt over 5:19 put the Huskies firmly in control. UConn ended the game on an 11–4 run and cruised to a 90–49 victory. Dwayne Koroma scored 13 points and grabbed five rebounds to lead Le Moyne. AJ Dancler finished with five points and three assists.

The Dolphins participated in the Island U Invitational, a showcase event hosted by Texas A&M University–Corpus Christi, and met UT Martin on November 22. AJ Dancier scored 16 points to lead Le Moyne to a 65–53 victory over the Skyhawks. Ocypher Owens added 11 points, nine rebounds and three blocks for the Dolphins. Dwayne Koroma scored 11 points, grabbed eight rebounds and had three steals as Le Moyne improved to 2–4 on the season. The Dolphins held UT Martin to 25% shooting from the floor and 10% from three-point range. Owens and Robby Carmody both returned to the lineup after missing the previous four games with injuries suffered in the season opener at Syracuse.

The following day, the Dolphins fell, 82–61, to host Texas A&M–Corpus Christi. The Islanders broke open a close game with a 13–0 run in the middle portion of the first half. Ocypher Owens scored 14 points to lead Le Moyne and added six rebounds, three assists and two steals. Nate Fouts finished with 11 points, seven rebounds and three steals. Robby Carmody added 13 points and three assists.

Le Moyne shot 60.4% from the floor, a new program record for the Division I era, and held off a late charge in an 81–77 win at Manhattan on November 29. After the Jaspers cut the Dolphins' 16-point lead down to two, AJ Dancler hit a step-back triple with 1:12 to play to stall the rally. A pair of free throws by Robby Carmody with nine seconds left sealed the Le Moyne victory. Dwayne Koroma scored 17 points on 8-for-9 shooting from the floor and added five rebounds and five assists, despite being limited to 22 minutes by foul trouble. Ocypher Owens led the Dolphins with 18 points and nine rebounds and added six assists. Zek Tekin finished with 16 points, eight assists, five rebounds and three steals for Le Moyne. Carmody had 15 points and three steals. Trent Mosquera left the game with an injury and did not return for the remainder of the season. This was Le Moyne's first win over Manhattan in the seventh all-time meeting between the programs, the most recent being February 2, 1957.

Dwayne Koroma and Ocypher Owens were named NEC Prime Performers for the fourth week of the season. Koroma averaged 15.5 points, 6.5 rebounds and five aassists per game while shooting 75% from the floor. Owens averaged 12.5 points, 8.5 rebounds and 4.5 assists per game and shot 50% from the field.

The Dolphins hosted Army in a thriller on December 3. The Black Knights had a 14-point lead with less than five minutes to play, but Le Moyne stormed back and tied the game on Dwayne Koroma's layup with four seconds left. Army held another late lead in overtime, but AJ Dancler tied the score at 82 for the Dolphins. Zek Tekin then stole the ball, but his three-pointer at the buzzer was off the mark. Tekin's pair of free throws in the closing seconds of double overtime tied the game again. Ryan Curry's three-pointer with 6.9 seconds remaining in triple overtime broke a tie and gave Army a 103–100 lead. Dancler shot a three-pointer at the buzzer, but it was off the mark, and Army held on for the win. According to the KenPom win probability metric, the game was the third most exciting game up that that point in the Division I season. Koroma and Ocypher Owens each had their first career double-double for Le Moyne. Koroma finished with 19 points, 15 rebounds and two steals. Owens had 14 points, 11 rebounds and four blocks. Tekin matched Koroma for team-high scoring honors with 19 points and added seven rebounds, five assists and three steals. Jalen Rucker scored 34 and added 13 rebounds, five assists and six steals for Army. Will Amica returned to the lineup after missing the previous four games with an injury.

Dwayne Koroma and Ocypher Owens were named NEC Prime Performers for the fifth week of the season. Koroma averaged 12.5 points, 12.5 rebounds, 2.5 assists, 1.5 blocks and 1.5 steals per game while shooting 71.4% from the field. Koroma would have been leading Division I in field-goal accuracy were he not playing for a transitioning team. Owens averaged 13 points, 10 rebounds, 2.5 assists and two blocks while shooting 52.2% from the floor.

Jakob Blakley was named NEC Rookie of the Week after hitting eight three-pointers and scoring 28 points in the Dolphins' 106–51 win over SUNY Delhi on December 14. Blakley entered the game with only three triples in his collegiate career. He also grabbed five rebounds and had three steals in the game, both new career highs. Robby Carmody scored 14 points in only 10 minutes of action for Le Moyne. Freshman Isaac Nyakundi came off the bench to score 11 points and grab seven rebounds.

AJ Dancler scored a career-high 20 points and grabbed three rebounds to lead the Dolphins to an 80–76 win at Dartmouth on December 18. Robby Carmody's three-pointer gave Le Moyne a 69–66 lead, and Nate Fouts followed with a pair of free throws to put the Dolphins ahead by five points with 1:41 to play. Dancler answered a Big Green basket with a triple to extend the lead to six points, but Dartmouth hit another three-pointer with 33 seconds to play. Zek Tekin sank four free throws, and Carmody hit two more in the closing seconds to seal the victory. Carmody finished with 13 points, three rebounds and two steals, while Fouts added 13 points, five rebounds and three assists. Tekin had 12 points, six rebounds, six assists and three steals, and Dwayne Koroma snatched a team-high seven rebounds while scoring 10 points.

Le Moyne's December 22 game at Notre Dame fulfilled a promise made nearly 70 years earlier. In March 1955, Notre Dame athletic director Moose Krause was the keynote speaker at the Dolphins' annual athletic banquet. While making his remarks, Krause said that he hoped Notre Dame and Le Moyne could schedule a basketball game in the not too distant future. In the first-ever meeting between the programs, the Fighting Irish went on a 16–2 run over a span of 4:27 to extend their three-point lead to 34–17. The Dolphins were unable to close the gap and fell, 91–62. Dwayne Koroma scored a career-high 22 points to lead the Dolphins and added eight rebounds, two assists, two steals and a blocked shot. Graduate transfer Robby Carmody had 13 points, three rebounds and two steals against his former teammates. AJ Dancler finished with 10 points, three assists and three rebounds.

AJ Dancler and Dwayne Koroma were named NEC Prime Performers for the seventh week of the season. Dancler averaged 15 points, three rebounds and two assists while shooting 50% from the floor and 41.7% from beyond the arc. Koroma averaged 16 points, 7.5 rebounds and 1.5 steals while shooting 81.3% from the field and 100% from three-point range.

AJ Dancler was named an NEC Prime Performer for the eighth week of the season. Dancler scored 17 points and had three assists and four steals while shooting 3 for 5 from beyond the arc in the Dolphins' 88–69 loss at Niagara on December 29. Ocypher Owens had a double-double for Le Moyne with 11 points, 10 rebounds, three assists and a blocked shot. Freds Pauls Bagatskis returned to the lineup in the Niagara game after missing the previous nine contests with an injury. The Dolphins finished their non-conference schedule with a record of 5–10.

=== Conference season ===
LIU hosted Le Moyne at Barclays Center in the NEC opener for both teams on January 3, 2025. Leading by a point in the second half, the Sharks went on a 24–6 run over a span of 9:14 to break the game open and cruised to a 78–62 victory. LIU shot 56% from the floor and 54% from distance for the game. Ocypher Owens had a double-double for the Dolphins with 19 points on 7-for-8 shooting from the floor, 12 rebounds and five blocks. Robby Carmody added 16 points and two steals for Le Moyne. Owens was named an NEC Prime Performer for the season's ninth week for his performance.

The Dolphins hosted Fairleigh Dickinson in a thriller on January 10. The Knights scored the first four points of the second half to claim a 10-point lead. Le Moyne responded with the first of a series of bursts the teams traded during the second half, this one a 23–7 extended run to move ahead, 45–39 with 13:14 to play. Fairleigh Dickinson followed with a 9–2 run to reclaim the lead at 48–47 with 7:15 remaining. A 7–0 Le Moyne run gave them a six-point lead with 4:46 on the clock. The Knights scored 11 of the next 14 points and took a 59–57 lead with 1:38 left. A pair of Nate Fouts free throws with 12 seconds to play tied the score and sent the game to overtime. The pattern of runs was not halted in the extra session. The Knights scored eight of the first nine points after just 1:26 had elapsed to claim a 67–60 lead. The Dolphins used an 11–4 run to tie the score at 71. After each team scored two more points, Le Moyne forced a shot-clock violation with 3.9 seconds to play, but the Dolphins could not get a shot off before the buzzer. Fairleigh Dickinson took an 80–75 lead early in double overtime, and Le Moyne was unable to tie the score again. The Knights hit their free throws down the stretch and won the game, 91–86. Fouts and Ocypher Owens each had a double-double for the Dolphins. Fouts finished with 15 points and 10 rebounds, and Owens had 21 points and 13 boards. AJ Dancler had 18 points, eight rebounds and two steals for Le Moyne. The double-double was the fourth of the campaign for Owens, the most in the NEC to that point in the season.

Dwayne Koroma had a double-double with 16 points and 10 rebounds to lead the Dolphins to a 79–63 wire-to-wire home win over Mercyhurst, their first NEC win of the season, on January 12. Le Moyne raced out to early leads of 10–0 and 16–2 and maintained control of the game throughout. AJ Dancler scored 14 points, grabbed seven rebounds and dished four assists for the Dolphins, who improved to 6–12 overall and 1–2 in NEC play.

AJ Dancler and Ocypher Owens were named NEC Prime Performers for the 10th week of the season. Dancler averaged 16 points, 7.5 rebounds, 3.5 assists and one steal per game while shooting 52.6% from the floor and 50% from beyond the arc. Owens averaged 16.5 points, eight rebounds and two assists per game while shooting 55.6% from the field.

Chicago State had their highest scoring output of the season in their 88–72 win over Le Moyne on January 18, the first home win of the campaign for the Cougars. Chicago State shot 54.7% from floor and 57.9% from beyond the arc. AJ Dancier had 19 points, six rebounds and five assists for the Dolphins, and Dwayne Koroma added 12 points, 10 rebounds and three steals to post his third straight double-double. Freds Pauls Bagatskis played only five minutes in the game and missed the remainder of the season with an injury.

Le Moyne surrendered a 20–0 run over five minutes in their January 20 home game versus Stonehill and saw their 64–45 evaporate and become a one-point deficit with 1:55 to play. After the shellshocked Dolphins reclaimed the lead, Hermann Koffi hit a triple with nine seconds left to put the Skyhawks in front, 72–71. Robby Carmody was then fouled with four seconds to play and drained both free throws to give Le Moyne a 73–72 victory. Carmody had 20 points and seven rebounds for the Dolphins. AJ Dancler finished with 19 points, seven rebounds and nine assists for Le Moyne, and Dwayne Koroma added nine points and 11 rebounds.

Robby Carmody and AJ Dancler were named NEC Prime Performers for the 11th week of the season. Carmody averaged 18 points and six rebounds per game while shooting 50% from the field and 63.6% from three-point ranger. Dancler averaged 19 points, 6.5 rebounds, seven assists and 1.5 steals per game while shooting 50% from the floor and 46.2% from beyond the arc.

AJ Dancler was named an NEC Prime Performer for his 18 points, three rebounds, seven assists and two steals on 3-for-7 shooting from three-point range in the Dolphins' 93–70 home loss to Central Connecticut on January 24.

AJ Dancler and Dwayne Koroma were named NEC Prime Performers for the 13th week of the season. Dancler averaged 18.5 points, three rebounds, three assists and one steal while shooting 46.2% from beyond the arc. He had a career-high 24 points on 9-for-18 shooting from the floor in the Dolphins' 73–61 loss at Wagner on February 1. Koroma averaged 17.5 points, 9.5 rebounds, two assists and 2.5 steals while shooting 71.4% from three-point range. He hit 10 of 12 shots and grabbed a career-high tying 15 rebounds in the Dolphins' 78–74 loss at Fairleigh Dickinson on January 30.

After falling behind by 15 points at halftime, 18 points early in the second half and 16 points with 5:40 to play, the Dolphins went on a 15–3 run and trailed, 78–74, with 2:10 remaining at Saint Francis on February 6. However, Le Moyne's late charge was not enough, as the Red Flash went 8 for 8 from the free-throw line over the final 1:18 to secure an 86–78 victory. AJ Dancler led the Dolphins with 22 points and seven assists. Robby Carmody added 19 points, three rebounds and two steals, and Dwayne Koroma had 15 points, nine rebounds, two assists and three steals for Le Moyne.

For the second straight game on their Western Pennsylvania trip, the Dolphins found themselves in a hole in their February 8 game at Mercyhurst. The Lakers had a 14-point lead with 13:24 remaining, and the Dolphins chipped away. A triple by Darrick Jones Jr. with 1:17 to play finally tied the score at 74. However, Le Moyne managed only a pair of free throws on their next three possessions, while Mercyhurst hit four foul shots and a layup on their next three trips and held on for an 82–78 victory. AJ Dancier scored 32 points to lead the Dolphins and added five rebounds and three assists. Nate Fouts finished with 17 points, nine rebounds and three assists for Le Moyne. Robby Carmody had 11 points, three rebounds and five assists.

AJ Dancler was named an NEC Prime Performer for the 14th week of the season. He averaged 27 points, three rebounds and five assists per game and shot 57.1% from the floor.

The Dolphins led Wagner by six points with under a minute to play in their February 13 home game, but the Seahawks found themselves inbounding the ball from midcourt with one second to play and the deficit trimmed to three points. Zaire Williams found space in the corner and drained a three-pointer at the buzzer to send the game to an extra session. AJ Dancler scored eight of Le Moyne's ten points in overtime, including a three-point play with 1:48 to go that gave the Dolphins a six-point lead. Dancler finished with 17 points, all of them scored after halftime, four rebounds, three assists and two steals, and the Dolphins snapped their five-game losing streak with a 72–68 victory. Deng Garang added 15 points, one rebound, two assists and two steals.

AJ Dancler's step-back triple was the dagger that secured Le Moyne's 80–75 home win over Chicago State on February 15. Dancler finished with 19 points, seven rebounds, five assists and a steal. Deng Garang added 15 points two rebounds, three assists and two steals, and Dwayne Koroma shot 7 for 9 from the field, finishing with 14 points, 13 rebounds, two assists and a steal for the Dolphins. Koroma's five double-doubles on the season were the most among NEC players.

Deng Garang was named NEC rookie of the week for the season's 15th week. He averaged 15 points, 1.5 rebounds, 2.5 assists and two steals, shooting 60% from the floor and 75% from beyond the arc, and was 6 for 6 from the free-throw line. Garang's 15 points against Wagner set a new career high, which he matched against Chicago State. AJ Dancler was named an NEC Prime Performer. He averaged 18 points, 5.5 rebounds, four assists and 1.5 steals per game and shot 92.3% from the charity stripe.

The Dolphins went on a 12–2 run late in their home game against Saint Francis on February 20, to take a three-point lead with 2:54 to play. However, Le Moyne was unable to score during the remainder of regulation, and the Red Flash knotted the game at 66 on a pair of free throws with 15 seconds left. AJ Dancler's shot at the buzzer missed, and the game went to overtime. After the Dolphins claimed an early five-point lead in the extra session, Saint Francis went on a 7–0 run to push back in front. Dancler's layup tied the score with 1:14 left. After Le Moyne got a stop on the defensive end, Dwayne Koroma's turnover led to a pair of free throws to give the Red Flash the lead with 38 seconds on the clock. Following Robby Carmody's turnover, Saint Francis added two more points on free throws, swelling their lead to four points with 18 seconds to play. The Red Flash held on for an 81–76 victory. Dancler led the Dolphins with 30 points and had four assists. Freshman Deng Garang scored a career-high 20 points for Le Moyne.

The Dolphins dropped their February 22 senior day game against LIU, 76–61. AJ Dancler had 17 points, four rebounds, four assists, two steals and a blocked shot for Le Moyne. Dancler was 12 for 12 from the free-throw line. Senior Ocypher Owens added nine points, and Dwayne Koroma had eight points and six rebounds for the Dolphins.

Deng Garang was named NEC co-rookie of the week for the season's 16th week. He averaged 14 points and three rebounds per game, shooting 67% from the field and 75% from three-point range. AJ Dancler was named an NEC Prime Performer. He averaged 23.5 points, four rebounds, four assists and one steal per game and shot 93.8% from the free-throw line.

Central Connecticut clinched the outright NEC regular-season championship with an 84–75 home win over the Dolphins on February 27. AJ Dancler scored a game-high 25 points and added four rebounds, four assists and three steals for the Dolphins. Nate Fouts had 22 points, seven rebounds and seven assists for Le Moyne.

After Chicago State lost earlier in the day, the Dolphins had a chance to clinch the no. 7 seed in the NEC tournament and avoid facing top seed Central Connecticut in the quarterfinals. Le Moyne led at Stonehill by as many as 12 points in the second half, but the Skyhawks rallied during the final 10 minutes to earn an 85–79 victory. AJ Dancler scored 28 points and added five rebounds, four assists and two steals to lead the Dolphins. Ocypher Owens had 14 points and two steals, and Deng Garang added 13 points for Le Moyne.

AJ Dancler was named an NEC Prime Performer for the season's 17th week. He averaged 26.5 points, 4.5 rebounds, four assists and 2.5 steals per game and shot 47.1% from three-point range.

Following the conclusion of the regular season, AJ Dancler was named second-team All-NEC.

=== Postseason ===
Le Moyne finished tied for last place with Chicago State and lost the tiebreaker for the no. 7 seed in the NEC tournament. The teams split their regular-season meetings, and both were swept by first-place Central Connecticut. Chicago State was 1–1 versus second-place LIU, while Le Moyne was 0–2. The no. 8 seed Dolphins played at no. 1 seed Central Connecticut in the NEC quarterfinals. The teams played a close contest for the first five minutes, until a 9–0 Blue Devils spurt over 1:20 put Central Connecticut in control. Le Moyne closed back to within four points, but the Blue Devils responded with a 17–4 extended run to take a 17–point lead with 5:46 to play in the first half. Despite the Dolphins closing the half on a 7–2 run, Central Connecticut led by 16 at the break. Le Moyne held the Blue Devils scoreless over the first six minutes of the second half and scored eight points of their own to cut the deficit to eight points. However, Central Connecticut responded with a 13–2 run to push the lead back to 19 points with 10:13 to go, and the Blue Devils coasted to an 86–67 victory. Dwayne Koroma scored a game-high and career-high 24 points and added seven rebounds and two steals. AJ Dancler finished with 15 points, seven rebounds and two assists. Nate Fouts added 13 points, four rebounds, three assists and two steals. The Dolphins finished the season 9–23.

=== Notable statistics ===
Dwayne Koroma led the NEC in field-goal shooting percentage at 71.4%. AJ Dancler was fourth in scoring average with 15.1 points per game and fifth in the league with 3.4 assists per game.

=== Final rankings ===
The Dolphins ended the season with a NET ranking of 350 out of 364 teams and a final KenPom rating of 354.

== Roster ==
2024–25 Le Moyne Dolphins men's basketball team
Players
Coaches

| Pos. | # | Name | Height | Weight | Year | Previous school | Hometown |
|---|---|---|---|---|---|---|---|
| G | 0 | AJ Dancler | 6 ft 2 in (1.88 m) | 175 lb (79 kg) | So | Southport High School | Indianapolis, IN |
| G | 1 | Darrick Jones Jr. (5Y) | 6 ft 5 in (1.96 m) | 200 lb (91 kg) | Sr | Towson | Richmond, VA |
| G | 2 | Kaelin Thomas (W) | 6 ft 2 in (1.88 m) | 165 lb (75 kg) | RS So | Seton Catholic Central | Binghamton, NY |
| F | 3 | Dwayne Koroma | 6 ft 8 in (2.03 m) | 205 lb (93 kg) | RS Jr | UT Arlington | Berlin, Germany |
| G | 4 | Zek Tekin | 6 ft 2 in (1.88 m) | 170 lb (77 kg) | Jr | Siena | Istanbul, Türkiye |
| F | 5 | Trevor Roe (injured) (redshirt) | 6 ft 8 in (2.03 m) | 205 lb (93 kg) | RS Fr | Radford | Syracuse, NY |
| G | 7 | Trent Mosquera (injured) (redshirt) | 6 ft 4 in (1.93 m) | 215 lb (98 kg) | Jr | Belmont Hill School | Brookline, MA |
| G | 10 | Jakob Blakley | 6 ft 0 in (1.83 m) | 170 lb (77 kg) | Fr | Walter Payton Prep | Elgin, IL |
| G | 11 | Robby Carmody (C) | 6 ft 4 in (1.93 m) | 195 lb (88 kg) | GS | Mercer | Mars, PA |
| F | 12 | Freds Pauls Bagatskis (injured) | 6 ft 8 in (2.03 m) | 180 lb (82 kg) | Jr | UT Arlington | Riga, Latvia |
| G | 13 | Deng Garang (W) | 6 ft 6 in (1.98 m) | 165 lb (75 kg) | RS Fr | Bishop Grimes High School | Syracuse, NY |
| F | 15 | Nate Fouts (FW) | 6 ft 8 in (2.03 m) | 215 lb (98 kg) | RS So | Kimball Union Academy | Skaneateles, NY |
| G | 22 | Will Amica | 6 ft 0 in (1.83 m) | 170 lb (77 kg) | GS | Albany | Syracuse, NY |
| F | 24 | Ocypher Owens | 6 ft 8 in (2.03 m) | 215 lb (98 kg) | Sr | Indian River State | Orlando, FL |
| F | 32 | Isaac Nyakundi | 6 ft 9 in (2.06 m) | 220 lb (100 kg) | Fr | MacDuffie | Duluth, MN |
| G | 33 | Sam Donnelly (W) | 6 ft 2 in (1.88 m) | 200 lb (91 kg) | GS | Vernon-Verona-Sherrill | Vernon, NY |

Head coach

- Nate Champion (Le Moyne)

Assistant coach(es)

- Ben Swank (Edinboro)
- Ben Marello (Florida Southern)
- Elijah Burns (Notre Dame, Siena)

Legend

- (C) Team captain
- (S) Suspended
- (I) Ineligible
- (W) Walk-on
- (FW) Former walk-on
- (5Y) Fifth-year senior
- Injured
- Current redshirt

Roster
Last update: March 12, 2025

=== Depth chart at the end of the season ===
| Pos. | Starting 5 | Bench 1 | Bench 2 | Bench 3 | Inactive |
|---|---|---|---|---|---|
| F/C | Dwayne Koroma | Ocypher Owens | Isaac Nyakundi |
| PF | Nate Fouts | | | | Trevor Roe |
| G/F | Darrick Jones Jr. | Deng Garang | | | Freds Pauls Bagatskis |
| SG | Robby Carmody | Jakob Blakley | Kaelin Thomas | | Trent Mosquera |
| PG | AJ Dancler | Will Amica | Zek Tekin | Sam Donnelly |

== Schedule and results ==
| Date time, TV | Rank^{#} | Opponent^{#} | Result | Record | High points | High rebounds | High assists | Site (attendance) city, state |
Exhibition
| October 30, 2024*; 6:00 p.m., NEC Front Row | | Mansfield | W 116–67 | – | 19 – Bagatskis | 10 – Nyakundi | 6 – Amica | Ted Grant Court (348); DeWitt, NY |
Non-conference regular season
| November 4, 2024*; 7:00 p.m., ACCNX/ESPN+ | | at Syracuse | L 82–86 | 0–1 | 18 – Bagatskis | 5 – Bagatskis | 6 – Tekin | JMA Wireless Dome (19,619); Syracuse, NY |
| November 6, 2024*; 7:00 p.m., NEC Front Row | | Cal State Northridge | L 75–97 | 0–2 | 17 – Tekin | 8 – 2 tied | 4 – Tekin | Ted Grant Court (497); DeWitt, NY |
| November 9, 2024*; 7:00 p.m., NEC Front Row | | SUNY Polytechnic | W 107–73 | 1–2 | 17 – Koroma | 6 – 2 tied | 6 – 2 tied | Ted Grant Court (507); DeWitt, NY |
| November 13, 2024*; 7:00 p.m., FS1 | | at No. 3 UConn | L 49–90 | 1–3 | 13 – Koroma | 5 – Koroma | 3 – Dancler | XL Center (15,664); Hartford, CT |
| November 16, 2024*; 4:00 p.m., YES/ESPN+ | | at St. Bonaventure | L 52–71 | 1–4 | 11 – Jones | 4 – Bagatskis | 4 – Amica | Reilly Center (4,239); St. Bonaventure, NY |
| November 22, 2024*; 6:00 p.m., ESPN+ | | vs. UT Martin; Island U Invitational | W 65–53 | 2–4 | 16 – Dancler | 9 – Owens | 5 – Tekin | Dugan Wellness Center (490); Corpus Christi, TX |
| November 23, 2024*; 4:30 p.m., ESPN+ | | at Texas A&M–Corpus Christi; Island U Invitational | L 61–82 | 2–5 | 14 – Owens | 7 – Fouts | 3 – 2 tied | Dugan Wellness Center (881); Corpus Christi, TX |
| November 25, 2024*; 7:30 p.m., ESPN+ | | at UT Rio Grande Valley | L 77–97 | 2–6 | 14 – 2 tied | 8 – 2 tied | 5 – Koroma | UTRGV Fieldhouse (1,658); Edinburg, TX |
| November 29, 2024*; 7:00 p.m., ESPN+ | | at Manhattan | W 81–77 | 3–6 | 18 – Owens | 9 – Owens | 8 – Tekin | Draddy Gymnasium (450); The Bronx, NY |
| December 3, 2024*; 7:00 p.m., NEC Front Row | | Army | L 100–103 ^{3OT} | 3–7 | 19 – 2 tied | 15 – Koroma | 5 – Tekin | Ted Grant Court (803); DeWitt, NY |
| December 7, 2024*; 6:00 p.m., NEC Front Row | | Binghamton; Battle of the Interstate | L 62–72 | 3–8 | 12 – Owens | 10 – Koroma | 5 – Tekin | Ted Grant Court (1,162); DeWitt, NY |
| December 14, 2024*; 2:00 p.m., NEC Front Row | | SUNY Delhi | W 106–51 | 4–8 | 28 – Blakley | 8 – Fouts | 6 – 2 tied | Ted Grant Court (306); DeWitt, NY |
| December 18, 2024*; 11:00 a.m., ESPN+ | | at Dartmouth | W 80–76 | 5–8 | 20 – Dancler | 7 – Koroma | 6 – Tekin | Leede Arena (1,400); Hanover, NH |
| December 22, 2024*; 6:00 p.m., ACCN | | at Notre Dame | L 62–91 | 5–9 | 22 – Koroma | 8 – Koroma | 4 – Tekin | Purcell Pavilion (5,396); South Bend, IN |
| December 29, 2024*; 2:00 p.m., ESPN+ | | at Niagara | L 69–88 | 5–10 | 17 – Dancler | 10 – Owens | 3 – 2 tied | Gallagher Center (476); Lewiston, NY |
NEC regular season
| January 3, 2025; 7:00 p.m., NEC Front Row | | at LIU | L 62–78 | 5–11 (0–1) | 19 – Owens | 12 – Owens | 4 – Dancler | Barclays Center (350); Brooklyn, NY |
| January 10, 2025; 7:00 p.m., NEC Front Row | | Fairleigh Dickinson | L 86–91 ^{2OT} | 5–12 (0–2) | 21 – Owens | 13 – Owens | 3 – 3 tied | Ted Grant Court (491); DeWitt, NY |
| January 12, 2025; 2:00 p.m., NEC Front Row | | Mercyhurst | W 79–63 | 6–12 (1–2) | 16 – Koroma | 10 – Koroma | 4 – Dancler | Ted Grant Court (479); DeWitt, NY |
| January 18, 2025; 2:00 p.m., NEC Front Row | | at Chicago State | L 72–88 | 6–13 (1–3) | 19 – Dancler | 10 – Koroma | 5 – Dancler | Jones Convocation Center (216); Chicago, IL |
| January 20, 2025; 7:30 p.m., NEC Front Row | | Stonehill | W 73–72 | 7–13 (2–3) | 20 – Carmody | 11 – Koroma | 9 – Dancler | Ted Grant Court (573); DeWitt, NY |
| January 24, 2025; 7:00 p.m., NEC Front Row | | Central Connecticut | L 70–93 | 7–14 (2–4) | 18 – Dancler | 6 – 2 tied | 7 – Dancler | Ted Grant Court (370); DeWitt, NY |
| January 30, 2025; 7:00 p.m., YES/NEC Front Row | | at Fairleigh Dickinson | L 74–78 | 7–15 (2–5) | 21 – Koroma | 15 – Koroma | 4 – 2 tied | Bogota Savings Bank Center (508); Hackensack, NJ |
| February 1, 2025; 1:00 p.m., NEC Front Row | | at Wagner | L 61–73 | 7–16 (2–6) | 24 – Dancler | 4 – 2 tied | 2 – 2 tied | Spiro Sports Center (807); Staten Island, NY |
| February 6, 2025; 7:00 p.m., NEC Front Row | | at Saint Francis | L 78–86 | 7–17 (2–7) | 22 – Dancler | 9 – Koroma | 7 – Dancler | DeGol Arena (992); Loretto, PA |
| February 8, 2025; 3:00 p.m., NEC Front Row | | at Mercyhurst | L 78–82 | 7–18 (2–8) | 32 – Dancler | 9 – Fouts | 5 – Carmody | Owen McCormick Court (684); Erie, PA |
| February 13, 2025; 7:00 p.m., NEC Front Row | | Wagner | W 72–68 ^{OT} | 8–18 (3–8) | 17 – Dancler | 9 – Koroma | 3 – 2 tied | Ted Grant Court (472); DeWitt, NY |
| February 15, 2025; 1:00 p.m., NEC Front Row | | Chicago State | W 80–75 | 9–18 (4–8) | 19 – Dancler | 13 – Koroma | 5 – Dancler | Ted Grant Court (520); DeWitt, NY |
| February 20, 2025; 7:00 pm, NEC Front Row | | Saint Francis | L 76–81 ^{OT} | 9–19 (4–9) | 30 – Dancler | 7 – Owens | 6 – Koroma | Ted Grant Court (481); DeWitt, NY |
| February 22, 2025; 4:00 p.m., ESPN+ | | LIU; Senior Day | L 61–76 | 9–20 (4–10) | 17 – Dancler | 6 – Koroma | 4 – 2 tied | Ted Grant Court (861); DeWitt, NY |
| February 27, 2025; 7:00 p.m., NEC Front Row | | at Central Connecticut | L 75–84 | 9–21 (4–11) | 25 – Dancler | 9 – Koroma | 7 – Fouts | William H. Detrick Gymnasium (1,008); New Britain, CT |
| March 1, 2025; 4:30 p.m., NEC Front Row | | at Stonehill | L 79–85 | 9–22 (4–12) | 28 – Dancler | 6 – 2 tied | 4 – Dancler | Merkert Gymnasium (1,054); Easton, MA |
NEC tournament
| March 5, 2025*; 7:00 p.m., NEC Front Row | (8) | at (1) Central Connecticut; Quarterfinals | L 67–86 | 9–23 | 24 – Koroma | 7 – 2 tied | 3 – 2 tied | William H. Detrick Gymnasium (2,013); New Britain, CT |
*Non-conference game. ^{#}Rankings from AP poll. (#) Tournament seedings in parentheses. All times are in Eastern.

== Awards and honors ==
Conference season honors
| Honors | Player | Position | Ref. |
|---|---|---|---|
| All-NEC Second Team | AJ Dancler | G | |

Weekly conference awards and honors
| Honors | Player | Position | Date awarded | Ref. |
|---|---|---|---|---|
| NEC Prime Performer | Will Amica | G | November 11, 2024 | |
| NEC Prime Performer | Zek Tekin | G | November 11, 2024 | |
| NEC Prime Performer | Dwayne Koroma | F | December 2, 2024 | |
| NEC Prime Performer | Ocypher Owens | F | December 2, 2024 | |
| NEC Prime Performer | Dwayne Koroma | F | December 9, 2024 | |
| NEC Prime Performer | Ocypher Owens | F | December 9, 2024 | |
| NEC Rookie of the Week | Jakob Blakley | G | December 16, 2024 | |
| NEC Prime Performer | AJ Dancler | G | December 23, 2024 | |
| NEC Prime Performer | Dwayne Koroma | F | December 23, 2024 | |
| NEC Prime Performer | AJ Dancler | G | December 30, 2024 | |
| NEC Prime Performer | Ocypher Owens | F | January 7, 2025 | |
| NEC Prime Performer | AJ Dancler | G | January 14, 2025 | |
| NEC Prime Performer | Ocypher Owens | F | January 14, 2025 | |
| NEC Prime Performer | Robby Carmody | G | January 22, 2025 | |
| NEC Prime Performer | AJ Dancler | G | January 22, 2025 | |
| NEC Prime Performer | AJ Dancler | G | January 28, 2025 | |
| NEC Prime Performer | AJ Dancler | G | February 3, 2025 | |
| NEC Prime Performer | Dwayne Koroma | F | February 3, 2025 | |
| NEC Prime Performer | AJ Dancler | G | February 10, 2025 | |
| NEC Rookie of the Week | Deng Garang | G | February 17, 2025 | |
| NEC Prime Performer | AJ Dancler | G | February 17, 2025 | |
| NEC Co-Rookie of the Week | Deng Garang | G | February 24, 2025 | |
| NEC Prime Performer | AJ Dancler | G | February 24, 2025 | |
| NEC Prime Performer | AJ Dancler | G | March 3, 2025 | |

== Player statistics ==
Individual player statistics
| | | | Minutes | | Scoring | | Field-goal shooting | | | Three-point shooting | | | Free-throw shooting | | | Rebounds | | | | Assists | | Steals | | Blocks | | | |
| Player | GP | GS | Tot | Avg | Pts | Avg | FG | FGA | Pct | 3FG | 3FA | Pct | FT | FTA | Pct | Off | Def | Tot | Avg | Tot | Avg | Tot | Avg | Tot | Avg | PF | TO |
|---|---|---|---|---|---|---|---|---|---|---|---|---|---|---|---|---|---|---|---|---|---|---|---|---|---|---|---|
| AJ Dancler | 30 | 22 | 960 | 32.0 | 453 | 15.1 | 154 | 346 | 44.5% | 67 | 166 | 40.4% | 78 | 102 | 76.5% | 13 | 101 | 114 | 3.8 | 101 | 3.4 | 33 | 1.10 | 6 | 0.20 | 60 | 79 |
| Dwayne Koroma | 31 | 30 | 878 | 28.3 | 357 | 11.5 | 152 | 213 | 71.4%† | 5 | 14 | 35.7% | 48 | 102 | 47.1% | 73 | 150 | 223 | 7.2 | 61 | 2.0 | 42 | 1.35 | 7 | 0.23 | 92 | 79 |
| Robby Carmody | 25 | 24 | 630 | 25.2 | 281 | 11.2 | 85 | 192 | 44.3% | 38 | 100 | 38.0% | 73 | 92 | 79.3% | 19 | 40 | 59 | 2.4 | 27 | 1.1 | 22 | 0.88 | 6 | 0.24 | 65 | 32 |
| Ocypher Owens | 22 | 10 | 598 | 27.2 | 201 | 9.1 | 70 | 147 | 47.6% | 11 | 47 | 23.4% | 50 | 70 | 71.4% | 30 | 106 | 136 | 6.2 | 30 | 1.4 | 12 | 0.55 | 20 | 0.91 | 50 | 31 |
| Nate Fouts | 32 | 19 | 842 | 26.3 | 277 | 8.7 | 103 | 225 | 45.8% | 27 | 84 | 32.1% | 44 | 66 | 66.7% | 36 | 110 | 146 | 4.6 | 65 | 2.0 | 25 | 0.78 | 12 | 0.38 | 75 | 50 |
| Deng Garang | 13 | 6 | 302 | 23.2 | 98 | 7.5 | 34 | 67 | 50.7% | 17 | 35 | 48.6% | 13 | 14 | 92.9% | 6 | 16 | 22 | 1.7 | 13 | 1.0 | 12 | 0.92 | 2 | 0.15 | 17 | 13 |
| Zek Tekin | 23 | 15 | 555 | 24.1 | 162 | 7.0 | 49 | 121 | 40.5% | 5 | 32 | 15.6% | 59 | 77 | 76.6% | 10 | 41 | 51 | 2.2 | 79 | 3.4 | 33 | 1.43 | 1 | 0.04 | 50 | 45 |
| Trent Mosquera | 9 | 0 | 143 | 15.9 | 61 | 6.8 | 23 | 53 | 43.4% | 11 | 36 | 30.6% | 4 | 5 | 80.0% | 3 | 15 | 18 | 2.0 | 7 | 0.8 | 3 | 0.33 | 1 | 0.11 | 13 | 11 |
| Freds Pauls Bagatskis | 10 | 5 | 194 | 19.4 | 61 | 6.1 | 15 | 63 | 23.8% | 11 | 50 | 22.0% | 20 | 26 | 76.9% | 1 | 21 | 22 | 2.2 | 12 | 1.2 | 3 | 0.30 | 1 | 0.10 | 13 | 8 |
| Darrick Jones Jr. | 31 | 24 | 664 | 21.4 | 171 | 5.5 | 54 | 147 | 36.7% | 37 | 98 | 37.8% | 26 | 35 | 74.3% | 25 | 38 | 63 | 2.0 | 16 | 0.5 | 12 | 0.39 | 5 | 0.16 | 56 | 18 |
| Will Amica | 25 | 5 | 413 | 16.5 | 130 | 5.2 | 46 | 118 | 39.0% | 9 | 27 | 33.3% | 29 | 36 | 80.6% | 18 | 30 | 48 | 1.9 | 27 | 1.1 | 15 | 0.60 | 3 | 0.12 | 79 | 29 |
| Jakob Blakley | 24 | 0 | 259 | 10.8 | 70 | 2.9 | 23 | 74 | 31.1% | 12 | 46 | 26.1% | 12 | 15 | 80.0% | 7 | 26 | 33 | 1.4 | 12 | 0.5 | 8 | 0.33 | 0 | 0.00 | 30 | 12 |
| Kaelin Thomas | 5 | 0 | 29 | 5.8 | 11 | 2.2 | 5 | 10 | 50.0% | 0 | 2 | 0.0% | 1 | 5 | 20.0% | 5 | 4 | 9 | 1.8 | 1 | 0.2 | 0 | 0.00 | 1 | 0.20 | 2 | 1 |
| Isaac Nyakundi | 16 | 0 | 82 | 5.1 | 29 | 1.8 | 11 | 20 | 55.0% | 1 | 5 | 20.0% | 6 | 13 | 46.2% | 7 | 10 | 17 | 1.1 | 1 | 0.1 | 2 | 0.13 | 4 | 0.25 | 8 | 7 |
| Sam Donnelly | 6 | 0 | 26 | 4.3 | 9 | 1.5 | 2 | 6 | 33.3% | 2 | 4 | 50.0% | 3 | 4 | 75.0% | 2 | 4 | 6 | 1.0 | 2 | 0.3 | 0 | 0.00 | 0 | 0.00 | 4 | 1 |
| Team | | | | | | | | | | | | | | | | 35 | 49 | 84 | 2.6 | | | | | | | | 28 |
| Le Moyne | 32 | 32 | 6,575 | 205.5 | 2,371 | 74.1 | 826 | 1,802 | 45.8% | 253 | 746 | 33.9% | 466 | 662 | 70.4% | 290 | 761 | 1,051 | 32.8 | 454 | 14.2 | 222 | 6.94 | 69 | 2.16 | 614 | 444 |
| Opponents | 32 | 32 | 6,575 | 205.5 | 2,566 | 80.2 | 884 | 1,912 | 46.2% | 288 | 788 | 36.5% | 510 | 699 | 73.0% | 357 | 787 | 1,144 | 35.8 | 501 | 15.7 | 242 | 7.56 | 96 | 3.00 | 554 | 378 |

Legend
| GP | Games played | GS | Games started | Tot | Total |
| Avg | Average per game | Pts | Points | FG | Field goals made |
| FGA | Field-goal attempts | Pct | Percentage | 3FG | Three-point field goals made |
| 3FA | Three-point field-goal attempts | FT | Free throws made | FTA | Free-throw attempts |
| Off | Offensive rebounds | Def | Defensive rebounds | PF | Personal fouls |
| TO | Turnovers | High | Team high |
Generally, must have played in 24 (75%) of Le Moyne's games to be the leader in average or percentage categories.
The exception is where the player is still the leader in an average category when dividing the total by 24.
† Led conference.

== Media coverage ==
Every Dolphins game was broadcast live on Fox Sports Radio affiliates WOLF at 1490 AM and 92.5 FM in Syracuse and WOSW at 1300 AM and 92.5 FM in Oswego County. Le Moyne alumni Chris Granozio and Don Familo called the games with Granozio handling the play-by-play and Familo providing the analysis and color. Dolphins road games versus conference opponents and all their home games, except for the February 22 game against LIU, were streamed live and available for free on NEC Front Row, the Northeast Conference's streaming platform. The radio feed with Granozio and Familo on the call was heard on Dolphins home games that streamed on NEC Front Row. The home game versus LIU was streamed exclusively on ESPN+. Television or streaming coverage of non-conference road and neutral-site games was available on the media outlets with which the host team had made arrangements.
