= 2025–26 Texas A&M–Corpus Christi Islanders men's basketball team =

American college basketball season

2025–26 Texas A&M–Corpus Christi Islanders men's basketball
- Conference: Southland Conference
- Record: 18–15 (13–9 Southland)
- Head coach: Jim Shaw (3rd season)
- Assistant coaches: Ralph Davis; Terrence Rencher; Dylan Johnson; Johnathan Bell; Robert Edwards
- Home arena: Hilliard Center; Dugan Wellness Center

2025–26 Southland Conference men's basketball standings
| | Conf. | | | | Overall |
| Team | W | | L | PCT | W | | L | PCT |
|---|---|---|---|---|---|---|---|---|
| Stephen F. Austin | 20 | – | 2 | .909 | 28 | – | 6 | .824 |
| McNeese † | 19 | – | 3 | .864 | 28 | – | 6 | .824 |
| UT Rio Grande Valley | 14 | – | 8 | .636 | 19 | – | 14 | .576 |
| Texas A&M–Corpus Christi | 13 | – | 9 | .591 | 18 | – | 15 | .545 |
| New Orleans | 12 | – | 10 | .545 | 15 | – | 18 | .455 |
| Nicholls | 12 | – | 10 | .545 | 14 | – | 19 | .424 |
| Northwestern State | 8 | – | 14 | .364 | 10 | – | 22 | .313 |
| Houston Christian | 8 | – | 14 | .364 | 12 | – | 20 | .375 |
| Incarnate Word | 7 | – | 15 | .318 | 12 | – | 19 | .387 |
| Lamar | 7 | – | 15 | .318 | 12 | – | 19 | .387 |
| East Texas A&M | 6 | – | 16 | .273 | 11 | – | 21 | .344 |
| Southeastern Louisiana | 6 | – | 16 | .273 | 9 | – | 22 | .290 |
† 2026 Southland tournament winner

The 2025–26 Texas A&M–Corpus Christi Islanders men's basketball team represented Texas A&M University–Corpus Christi during the 2025–26 NCAA Division I men's basketball season. The Islanders were led by third-year head coach Jim Shaw. Five home games were scheduled at the Dugan Wellness Center, and eleven home games at the Hilliard Center. Both arenas are located in Corpus Christi, Texas.

== Previous season ==
The Islanders finished the 2024–25 season 20–14, 12–8 in Southland play, to finish tied in fourth place. As the fifth seed in the Southland tournament, the Islanders defeated Houston Christian in the first round before falling in the second round to Northwestern State. The Islanders were not invited to play in any postseason tournament.

== Offseason ==
=== Departures ===
| Name | Number | Pos. | Height | Weight | Year | Hometown | Reason for departure |

=== Incoming transfers ===
| Name | Number | Pos. | Height | Weight | Year | Hometown | Previous school |

== Roster ==
2025–26 Texas A&M–Corpus Christi Islanders men's basketball team
Players
Coaches

| Pos. | # | Name | Height | Weight | Year | Previous school | Hometown |
|---|---|---|---|---|---|---|---|
| G | 0 | D'Avian Houston | 6 ft 2 in (1.88 m) | 210 lb (95 kg) | GS | Coastal Carolina | Houston, TX |
| G | 1 | Nick Shogbonyo | 6 ft 1 in (1.85 m) | 185 lb (84 kg) | Sr | Denver | Arlington, TX |
| G | 2 | Leo Torber | 6 ft 3 in (1.91 m) | 195 lb (88 kg) | Sr | New Mexico Junior College | Brooklyn Park, MN |
| G | 3 | Mason Gibson | 6 ft 0 in (1.83 m) | 170 lb (77 kg) | GS | Midwestern State | Allen, TX |
| G | 4 | Kam Parker | 6 ft 2 in (1.88 m) | 180 lb (82 kg) | Sr | Independence Community College | Tulsa, OK |
| F | 5 | Kobi Pearson | 6 ft 8 in (2.03 m) | 215 lb (98 kg) | Fr | Lancaster High School | Lancaster, TX |
| F | 6 | Sheldon Williams | 6 ft 8 in (2.03 m) | 220 lb (100 kg) | Sr | Coastal Alabama Community College | Atmore, AL |
| F | 7 | Kayden Crosby | 6 ft 7 in (2.01 m) | 195 lb (88 kg) | RS Jr | North Platte Community College | Pflugerville, TX |
| G | 8 | Bryson Wheatfall | 6 ft 5 in (1.96 m) | 205 lb (93 kg) | Fr | Legacy Early College | Humble, TX |
| G | 10 | Daniel Michelini-Jackson | 6 ft 5 in (1.96 m) | 180 lb (82 kg) | Jr | East Los Angeles College | Inglewood, CA |
| F | 11 | Jaden Haire | 6 ft 7 in (2.01 m) | 235 lb (107 kg) | Jr | College of the Sequoias | Hanford, CA |
| G | 13 | Trenton Pane | 5 ft 10 in (1.78 m) | 180 lb (82 kg) | Fr | Allen High School | Allen, TX |
| G | 14 | Cedric Horton | 6 ft 5 in (1.96 m) | 185 lb (84 kg) | Fr | Hargrave Military Academy | Richmond, IN |
| F | 20 | Michael Oaks | 6 ft 10 in (2.08 m) | 220 lb (100 kg) | Jr | Detroit Mercy | Houston, TX |
| F | 22 | Franck Yetna | 6 ft 7 in (2.01 m) | 215 lb (98 kg) | GS | Lincoln University | Paris, France |
| F | 24 | Jamal Ambrose | 6 ft 10 in (2.08 m) | 260 lb (118 kg) | RS Jr | Omaha | Apple Valley, MN |
| F | 99 | Cenker Evran | 6 ft 8 in (2.03 m) | 235 lb (107 kg) | Sr | Edinboro | Adana, Turkey |

Head coach

- Jim Shaw (Grinnell)

Assistant coach(es)

- Ralph Davis (Texas A&M–Kingsville)
- Terrence Rencher (Texas)
- Dylan Johnson (Michigan)
- Johnathan Bell (Nicholls State)
- Robert Edwards (Nebraska)

Legend

- (C) Team captain
- (S) Suspended
- (I) Ineligible
- (W) Walk-on
- Injured
- Current redshirt

Roster
Last update: November 17, 2025

== Schedule and results ==
| Date time, TV | Rank^{#} | Opponent^{#} | Result | Record | High points | High rebounds | High assists | Site (attendance) city, state |
Exhibition
| October 25, 2025*; 2:00 p.m. | | Abilene Christian | L 77–82 | | 19 – Shogbonyo | 7 – Yetna | 5 – Yetna | Dugan Wellness Center (976); Corpus Christi, TX |
Regular season
| November 3, 2025*; 7:30 p.m. | | Trinity (TX) | W 83–56 | 1–0 | 19 – Gibson | 7 – Yetna | 6 – Michelini-Jackson | Dugan Wellness Center (1,254); Corpus Christi, TX |
| November 6, 2025*; 7:00 p.m., ACCNX | | at SMU | L 58–69 | 1–1 | 14 – Williams | 17 – Williams | 5 – Houston | Moody Coliseum (4,222); Dallas, TX |
| November 8, 2025*; 6:00 p.m., ESPN+ | | at Tarleton State | L 77–85 | 1–2 | 21 – Williams | 11 – Williams | 3 – 2 tied | EECU Center (1,661); Stephenville, TX |
| November 11, 2025*; 7:00 p.m., ESPN+ | | at No. 25 Kansas | L 46–77 | 1–3 | 11 – Yetna | 6 – Michelini-Jackson | 2 – 3 tied | Allen Fieldhouse (15,300); Lawrence, KS |
| November 16, 2025*; 1:00 p.m., ESPN+ | | at Oklahoma State | L 69–85 | 1–4 | 13 – Shogbonyo | 7 – Yetna | 4 – Parker | Gallagher-Iba Arena (6,251); Stillwater, OK |
| November 22, 2025*; 1:00 p.m., ESPN+ | | Howard Payne | W 122–75 | 2–4 | 17 – Williams | 7 – 2 tied | 9 – Houston | Dugan Wellness Center (1,018); Corpus Christi, TX |
| November 28, 2025*; 4:30 p.m., ESPN+ | | at Xavier | L 67–88 | 2–5 | 13 – Houston | 9 – Shogbonyo | 3 – 3 tied | Cintas Center (9,314); Cincinnati, OH |
| December 6, 2025; 6:00 p.m., ESPN+ | | at Lamar | W 57–49 | 3–5 (1–0) | 18 – Shogbonyo | 9 – Evran | 2 – 2 tied | Neches Arena (1,349); Beaumont, TX |
| December 12, 2025*; 7:00 p.m., ESPN+ | | Dallas Christian | W 108–55 | 4–5 | 22 – Michelini-Jackson | 7 – 2 tied | 5 – Michelini-Jackson | Dugan Wellness Center (893); Corpus Christi, TX |
| December 17, 2025; 8:00 p.m., ESPN+ | | at Stephen F. Austin | L 60–69 | 4–6 (1–1) | 15 – Gibson | 9 – Williams | 4 – Shogbonyo | William R. Johnson Coliseum (1,112); Nacogdoches, TX |
| December 20, 2025*; 7:30 p.m., ESPN+ | | Southwestern Adventist | W 93–36 | 5–6 | 13 – Torbor | 10 – Williams | 4 – Horton | Dugan Wellness Center (792); Corpus Christi, TX |
| December 29, 2025; 7:30 p.m., ESPN+ | | Nicholls | L 71–76 | 5–7 (1–2) | 6 – Shogbonyo | 7 – Williams | 4 – Torbor | Hilliard Center (1,223); Corpus Christi, TX |
| December 31, 2025; 3:30 p.m., ESPN+ | | New Orleans | W 83–69 | 6–7 (2–2) | 22 – Gibson | 9 – Evran | 5 – Parker | Hilliard Center (1,089); Corpus Christi, TX |
| January 3, 2026; 4:30 p.m., ESPN+ | | at UT Rio Grande Valley; South Texas Showdown | W 63–59 | 7–7 (3–2) | 11 – Williams | 8 – Evran | 4 – Houston | UTRGV Fieldhouse (1,173); Edinburg, TX |
| January 5, 2026; 7:00 p.m., ESPN+ | | at Houston Christian | W 81–65 | 8–7 (4–2) | 16 – Williams | 7 – Williams | 4 – Torbor | Sharp Gymnasium (473); Houston, TX |
| January 10, 2026; 3:30 p.m., ESPN+ | | at Northwestern State | L 78–79 | 8–8 (4–3) | 14 – Gibson | 5 – Williams | 2 – Haire | Prather Coliseum (812); Natchitoches, LA |
| January 12, 2026; 6:30 p.m., ESPN+ | | at East Texas A&M | W 61–50 | 9–8 (5–3) | 16 – Shogbonyo | 8 – Williams | 2 – Gibson | The Field House (784); Commerce, TX |
| January 17, 2026; 3:30 p.m., ESPN+ | | Southeastern Louisiana | W 68–56 | 10–8 (6–3) | 14 – Shogbonyo | 5 – Wheatfall | 2 – Yetna | Hilliard Center (2,011); Corpus Christi, TX |
| January 19, 2026; 3:00 p.m., ESPN+ | | McNeese | L 53–69 | 10–9 (6–4) | 13 – Williams | 8 – Williams | 2 – Yetna | Hilliard Center (1,038); Corpus Christi, TX |
| January 24, 2026; 4:00 p.m., ESPN+ | | at Incarnate Word | W 79–71 | 11–9 (7–4) | 22 – Williams | 11 – Williams | 3 – Williams | McDermott Center (N/A); San Antonio, TX |
| January 26, 2026; 7:00 p.m., ESPN+ | | UT Rio Grande Valley; South Texas Showdown | L 55–64 | 11–10 (7–5) | 12 – Shogbonyo | 8 – Evran | 4 – Torbor | Hilliard Center (1,571); Corpus Christi, TX |
| January 31, 2026; 3:30 p.m., ESPN+ | | Houston Christian | W 73–71 | 12–10 (8–5) | 18 – Gibson | 6 – Gibson | 3 – Evran | Hilliard Center (1,914); Corpus Christi, TX |
| February 2, 2026; 9:00 p.m., CBSSN | | Incarnate Word | L 69–71 | 12–11 (8–6) | 19 – Gibson | 10 – Williams | 5 – Houston | Hilliard Center (1,785); Corpus Christi, TX |
| February 7, 2026; 3:00 p.m., ESPN+ | | at Nicholls | W 83–76 | 13–11 (9–6) | 17 – Shogbonyo | 9 – Shogbonyo | 4 – Houston | Stopher Gymnasium (603); Thibodaux, LA |
| February 9, 2026; 7:00 p.m., ESPN+ | | at New Orleans | L 78–84 ^{OT} | 13–12 (9–7) | 20 – Williams | 10 – Williams | 3 – Shogbonyo | Lakefront Arena (396); New Orleans, LA |
| February 14, 2026; 4:30 p.m., ESPN+ | | Lamar | W 76–63 | 14–12 (10–7) | 13 – Houston | 8 – Wheatfall | 3 – Evran | Hilliard Center (1,511); Corpus Christi, TX |
| February 16, 2026; 7:00 p.m., ESPN+ | | Stephen F. Austin | L 68–78 | 14–13 (10–8) | 14 – Shogbonyo | 11 – Michelini-Jackson | 3 – Torbor | Hilliard Center (1,317); Corpus Christi, TX |
| February 21, 2026; 8:00 p.m., ESPNU | | at McNeese | L 54–70 | 14–14 (10–9) | 20 – Shogbonyo | 8 – Evran | 5 – Houston | The Legacy Center (3,298); Lake Charles, LA |
| February 23, 2026; 6:00 p.m., ESPN+ | | at Southeastern Louisiana | W 73–68 | 15–14 (11–9) | 14 – Evran | 5 – Williams | 3 – Parker | University Center (410); Hammond, LA |
| February 28, 2026; 5:30 p.m., ESPN+ | | Northwestern State | W 71–59 | 16–14 (12–9) | 14 – Williams | 7 – Yetna | 4 – Houston | Hilliard Center (2,118); Corpus Christi, TX |
| March 2, 2026; 7:00 p.m., ESPN+ | | East Texas A&M | W 84–71 | 17–14 (13–9) | 19 – Williams | 8 – Shogbonyo | 6 – Houston | Hilliard Center (1,423); Corpus Christi, TX |
Southland tournament
| March 9, 2026; 5:00 p.m., ESPN+ | (4) | vs. (5) New Orleans; Quarterfinals | W 74–61 | 18–14 | 28 – Michelini-Jackson | 8 – Michelini-Jackson | 6 – Houston | The Legacy Center; Lake Charles, LA |
| March 10, 2026; 6:00 p.m., ESPNU | (4) | vs. (1) Stephen F. Austin; Semifinals | L 58–60 | 18–15 | 16 – Houston | 10 – Williams | 4 – Houston | The Legacy Center; Lake Charles, LA |
*Non-conference game. ^{#}Rankings from AP poll. (#) Tournament seedings in parentheses. All times are in Central.
