= 2016–17 Texas A&M–Corpus Christi Islanders men's basketball team =

American college basketball season

2016–17 Texas A&M–Corpus Christi Islanders men's basketball

CIT, Runner-up
- Conference: Southland Conference
- Record: 24–12 (12–6 Southland)
- Head coach: Willis Wilson (6th season)
- Assistant coaches: Marty Gross; Mark Dannhoff; Terry Johnson
- Home arena: American Bank Center (Capacity: 8,280); Dugan Wellness Center

2016–17 Southland Conference men's basketball standings
| | Conf. | | | | Overall |
| Team | W | | L | PCT | W | | L | PCT |
|---|---|---|---|---|---|---|---|---|
| New Orleans † | 13 | – | 5 | .722 | 20 | – | 12 | .625 |
| Texas A&M–CC | 12 | – | 6 | .667 | 24 | – | 12 | .667 |
| Houston Baptist | 12 | – | 6 | .667 | 17 | – | 14 | .548 |
| Stephen F. Austin | 12 | – | 6 | .667 | 18 | – | 15 | .545 |
| Sam Houston State | 10 | – | 8 | .556 | 21 | – | 13 | .618 |
| Lamar | 10 | – | 8 | .556 | 19 | – | 15 | .559 |
| Southeastern Louisiana | 9 | – | 9 | .500 | 16 | – | 16 | .500 |
| Nicholls State | 7 | – | 11 | .389 | 14 | – | 17 | .452 |
| Abilene Christian* | 7 | – | 11 | .389 | 13 | – | 16 | .448 |
| Northwestern State | 7 | – | 11 | .389 | 13 | – | 16 | .448 |
| Incarnate Word* | 7 | – | 11 | .389 | 12 | – | 17 | .414 |
| Central Arkansas | 7 | – | 11 | .389 | 8 | – | 24 | .250 |
| McNeese State | 4 | – | 14 | .222 | 7 | – | 22 | .241 |
† 2017 Southland tournament winner * Ineligible for postseason during transition to Division I

The 2016–17 Texas A&M–Corpus Christi Islanders men's basketball team represented Texas A&M University–Corpus Christi in the 2016–17 NCAA Division I men's basketball season. Led by head coach Willis Wilson, in his sixth season at Texas A&M–Corpus Christi, the Islanders were members of the Southland Conference and played their home games at the American Bank Center and the Dugan Wellness Center. They finished the season 24–12, 12–6 in Southland play to finish in a three-way tie for second place. They defeated Stephen F. Austin to advance to the championship game of the Southland tournament where they lost to New Orleans. They were invited to the CollegeInsider.com Tournament where they defeated Georgia State, Weber State, Fort Wayne and UMBC to advance to the championship game where they lost to Saint Peter's.

== Previous season ==
The Islanders finished the 2015–16 season 25–8, 15–3 in Southland play to finish in second place. They defeated Sam Houston State to advance to the championship game of the Southland tournament where they lost to Stephen F. Austin. They received an invite to the CollegeInsider.com Tournament where they lost in the first round to Louisiana–Lafayette.

== Media ==
Texas A&M–Corpus Christi men's basketball airs on KKTX with Steven King on the call all season long. Video streaming of all non-televised home games is available at GoIslanders.com.

== Roster ==
2016–17 Texas A&M–Corpus Christi Islanders men's basketball team
Players
Coaches

| Pos. | # | Name | Height | Weight | Year | Previous school | Hometown |
|---|---|---|---|---|---|---|---|
| G | 0 | Brandon Pye | 6 ft 0 in (1.83 m) | 175 lb (79 kg) | Sr | Timberview HS | Mansfield, TX |
| G | 1 | Hameed Ali | 6 ft 2 in (1.88 m) | 180 lb (82 kg) | RS Sr | San Leandro HS | Hayward, CA |
| G | 2 | Cole Martinez | 6 ft 2 in (1.88 m) | 185 lb (84 kg) | Sr | Air Force Academy Prep | San Antonio, TX |
| G | 3 | Joe Kilgore | 6 ft 5 in (1.96 m) | 185 lb (84 kg) | So | Dekaney HS | Spring, TX |
| G | 4 | Ehab Amin | 6 ft 3 in (1.91 m) | 200 lb (91 kg) | So | St. John's Military Academy | Alexandria, Egypt |
| F | 5 | T. J. Traylor | 6 ft 8 in (2.03 m) | 215 lb (98 kg) | Sr | Dominguez HS | Los Angeles, CA |
| G | 10 | Kyle Brown | 5 ft 10 in (1.78 m) | 150 lb (68 kg) | Fr | Ridge Point | Fresno, TX |
| G | 11 | Jelani Currie | 6 ft 4 in (1.93 m) | 190 lb (86 kg) | Sr | Albany Academy | Albany, NY |
| G | 15 | David Bloom | 6 ft 4 in (1.93 m) | 205 lb (93 kg) | So | Prince of Peace Christian High School | Plano, TX |
| G | 22 | Emmanuel Toney | 6 ft 2 in (1.88 m) | 185 lb (84 kg) | Jr | Annapolis Area Christian | Annapolis, MD |
| F | 23 | Bryce Douvier | 6 ft 7 in (2.01 m) | 235 lb (107 kg) | RS Sr | Sedgwick HS; Northern Colorado | Sedgwick, KS |
| F | 25 | Rashawn Thomas | 6 ft 8 in (2.03 m) | 230 lb (104 kg) | Sr | Southeast HS | Oklahoma City, OK |
| F | 31 | Viktor Juricek | 6 ft 11 in (2.11 m) | 220 lb (100 kg) | Sr | Canarias Basketball Academy | Prievidza, Slovakia |
| F | 34 | Dale Francis | 6 ft 8 in (2.03 m) | 260 lb (118 kg) | Sr | Canarias Basketball Academy | Leighton Buzzard, England |

Head coach

- Willis Wilson (Rice)

Assistant coach(es)

- Marty Gross (Jacksonville)
- Mark Dannhoff (UW–La Crosse)
- Terry Johnson (Stanislaus State)

Legend

- (C) Team captain
- (S) Suspended
- (I) Ineligible
- (W) Walk-on
- Injured
- Current redshirt

Roster
Last update: 2016-09-25

== Schedule and results ==
| Date time, TV | Rank^{#} | Opponent^{#} | Result | Record | Site (attendance) city, state |
Exhibition
| November 5, 2016*; 5:00 pm | | Concordia | W 106–75 | | Dugan Wellness Center (923); Corpus Christi, TX |
Non-conference regular season
| November 11, 2016*; 7:00 pm | | Our Lady of the Lake | W 115–100 | 1–0 | American Bank Center (1,473); Corpus Christi, TX |
| November 16, 2016*; 7:00 pm | | at Texas–Rio Grande Valley | W 94–72 | 2–0 | UTRGV Fieldhouse (2,002); Edinburg, TX |
| November 21, 2016*; 7:00 pm | | at Texas State | W 73–69 | 3–0 | Strahan Coliseum (1,797); San Marcos, TX |
| November 23, 2016*; 7:30 pm | | Jarvis Christian | W 84–61 | 4–0 | American Bank Center (1,026); Corpus Christi, TX |
| November 29, 2016*; 7:00 pm | | Texas–Rio Grande Valley | W 84–68 | 5–0 | American Bank Center (2,003); Corpus Christi, TX |
| December 3, 2016*; 9:00 pm | | at Cal Poly | L 70–82 | 5–1 | Mott Gym (1,347); San Luis Obispo, CA |
| December 5, 2016*; 7:00 pm, SECN+ | | at Texas A&M | L 69–86 | 5–2 | Reed Arena (6,275); College Station, TX |
| December 9, 2016*; 7:00 pm | | St. Mary's (TX) | W 77–67 | 6–2 | American Bank Center (1,117); Corpus Christi, TX |
| December 18, 2016*; 2:00 pm | | UTSA | W 73–69 | 7–2 | American Bank Center (1,079); Corpus Christi, TX |
| December 20, 2016*; 7:00 pm | | at No. 19 Saint Mary's | L 46–67 | 7–3 | McKeon Pavilion (2,859); Moraga, CA |
| December 22, 2016*; 12:00 pm, FSOK | | at Oklahoma State | L 70–92 | 7–4 | Gallagher-Iba Arena (8,342); Stillwater, OK |
Southland regular season
| December 31, 2016; 6:15 pm | | at New Orleans | L 72–73 ^{OT} | 7–5 (0–1) | Lakefront Arena (517); New Orleans, LA |
| January 2, 2017; 8:20 pm | | at Nicholls | L 64–68 | 7–6 (0–2) | Stopher Gym (404); Thibodaux, LA |
| January 7, 2017; 7:00 pm | | Northwestern State | W 99–82 | 8–6 (1–2) | American Bank Center (1,172); Corpus Christi, TX |
| January 11, 2017; 7:00 pm, ESPN3 | | at Stephen F. Austin | L 46–79 | 8–7 (1–3) | William R. Johnson Coliseum (1,749); Nacogdoches, TX |
| January 14, 2017; 7:00 pm | | Central Arkansas | W 88–81 | 9–7 (2–3) | American Bank Center (1,223); Corpus Christi, TX |
| January 19, 2017; 7:00 pm, RTSW | | Stephen F. Austin | L 58–61 | 9–8 (2–4) | American Bank Center (2,377); Corpus Christi, TX |
| January 21, 2017; 6:15 pm | | at Sam Houston State | L 62–76 | 9–9 (2–5) | Bernard Johnson Coliseum (1,340); Huntsville, TX |
| January 25, 2017; 8:00 pm, ASN | | at Lamar | W 69–66 ^{OT} | 10–9 (3–5) | Montagne Center (2,188); Beaumont, TX |
| January 28, 2017; 7:00 pm, ESPN3 | | Abilene Christian | W 72–60 | 11–9 (4–5) | American Bank Center (1,857); Corpus Christi, TX |
| February 1, 2017; 7:30 pm | | Houston Baptist | W 90–79 | 12–9 (5–5) | American Bank Center (1,132); Corpus Christi, TX |
| February 8, 2017; 7:00 pm | | Southeastern Louisiana | W 80–75 | 13–9 (6–5) | American Bank Center (1,373); Corpus Christi, TX |
| February 11, 2017; 3:00 pm, RTSW | | at McNeese State | W 73–66 | 14–9 (7–5) | Burton Coliseum (833); Lake Charles, LA |
| February 15, 2017; 7:30 pm | | at Incarnate Word | W 97–81 | 15–9 (8–5) | Lakefront Arena (1,058); New Orleans, LA |
| February 18, 2017; 7:00 pm, ESPN3 | | Lamar | W 70–63 | 16–9 (9–5) | American Bank Center (3,535); Corpus Christi, TX |
| February 22, 2017; 7:30 pm | | at Abilene Christian | W 56–44 | 17–9 (10–5) | Moody Coliseum (1,227); Abilene, TX |
| February 25, 2017; 1:30 pm | | McNeese State | W 81–70 | 18–9 (11–5) | American Bank Center (1,462); Corpus Christi, TX |
| March 1, 2017; 7:00 pm | | at Houston Baptist | L 80–94 | 18–10 (11–6) | Sharp Gymnasium (787); Houston, TX |
| March 4, 2017; 1:30 pm | | Incarnate Word | W 81–64 | 19–10 (12–6) | American Bank Center (1,689); Corpus Christi, TX |
Southland tournament
| March 10, 2017; 7:30 pm, ESPN3 | (2) | vs. (3) Stephen F. Austin; Semifinals | W 77–69 | 20–10 | Merrell Center (2,318); Katy, TX |
| March 11, 2017; 8:30 pm, ESPN2 | (2) | vs. (1) New Orleans; Championship | L 65–68 | 20–11 | Merrell Center (2,068); Katy, TX |
CIT
| March 15, 2017*; 7:00 pm, Facebook Live | | Georgia State; First Round | W 80–64 | 21–11 | Dugan Wellness Center (897); Corpus Christi, TX |
| March 20, 2017*; 7:00 pm, Facebook Live | | Weber State; Second Round | W 82–72 | 22–11 | American Bank Center (1,116); Corpus Christi, TX |
| March 26, 2017*; 2:00 pm, Facebook Live | | Fort Wayne; Quarterfinals | W 78–62 | 23–11 | Dugan Wellness Center (1,151); Corpus Christi, TX |
| March 29, 2017*; 6:00 pm, CBSSN | | at UMBC; Semifinals | W 79–61 | 24–11 | Retriever Activities Center (1,388); Catonsville, MD |
| March 31, 2017*; 8:00 pm, CBSSN | | Saint Peter's; Championship | L 61–62 | 24–12 | Dugan Wellness Center (1,200); Corpus Christi, TX |
*Non-conference game. ^{#}Rankings from AP Poll. (#) Tournament seedings in parentheses.

== See also ==
- 2016–17 Texas A&M–Corpus Christi Islanders women's basketball team
