= Jim Shaw (basketball) =

American basketball coach (born 1980)

Current position
- Title: Head coach
- Team: Texas A&M–Corpus Christi
- Conference: Southland
- Record: 59–41 (.590)

Biographical details
- Born: September 25, 1980 (age 46); San Antonio, Texas, U.S.

Playing career
- 1999–2003: Grinnell
- Position: Guard

Coaching career (HC unless noted)
- 2003–2005: UTEP (grad asst.)
- 2014–2020: Texas State (asst.)
- 2020–2021: Tarleton (asst.)
- 2021–2023: Texas A&M–Corpus Christi (asst.)
- 2023–present: Texas A&M–Corpus Christi

Administrative career (AD unless noted)
- 2005–2006: UTEP (admin)
- 2006–2012: Nebraska (Video)
- 2012–2013: Texas Tech (director of basketball operations)
- 2013–2014: Texas State (director of basketball operations)

Head coaching record
- Overall: 59–41 (.590)
- Tournaments: 0–1 (CIT)

Jim Shaw (born September 25, 1980) is the current head men's college basketball coach for Texas A&M–Corpus Christi Islanders men's basketball team.

== Playing career ==
Shaw played college basketball at Grinnell College, where he led the high-scoring offense in made three-pointers en route to an NCAA Division III tournament appearance in 2001.

== Coaching career ==
Shaw began his coaching career as a graduate assistant with the UTEP Miners, where he earned his master's degree before joining the team's administration for a single season. In 2006, he'd move on to become a video coordinator at Nebraska, where he'd stay until 2012, working under Doc Sadler.

Shaw became the director of basketball operations at Texas Tech and Texas State respectively for one season each, before becoming an assistant coach for Texas State in 2014, staying in the role until 2020. Shaw would become assistant coach at Tarleton State in 2021 under Billy Gillispie for a single season before joining Steve Lutz's staff at Texas A&M–Corpus Christi.

On March 29 Texas A&M–Corpus Christi promoted Shaw to become their next head coach after Lutz departed for the head coaching position at Western Kentucky.

== Head coaching record ==
Record table
| Season | Team | Overall | Conference | Standing | Postseason |
|---|---|---|---|---|---|
Texas A&M–Corpus Christi Islanders (Southland Conference) (2023–present)
| 2023–24 | Texas A&M–Corpus Christi | 21–12 | 14–4 | 2nd | CIT First Round |
| 2024–25 | Texas A&M–Corpus Christi | 20–14 | 12–8 | T–4th | |
| 2025–26 | Texas A&M–Corpus Christi | 18–15 | 13–9 | 4th | |
| Texas A&M–Corpus Christi: | | 59–41 (.590) | 39–21 (.650) | | |
| Total: | | 59–41 (.590) | | | |
National champion Postseason invitational champion Conference regular season champion Conference regular season and conference tournament champion Division regular season champion Division regular season and conference tournament champion Conference tournament champion
