= 2024–25 UT Rio Grande Valley Vaqueros men's basketball team =

American college basketball team

2024–25 UT Rio Grande Valley Vaqueros men's basketball
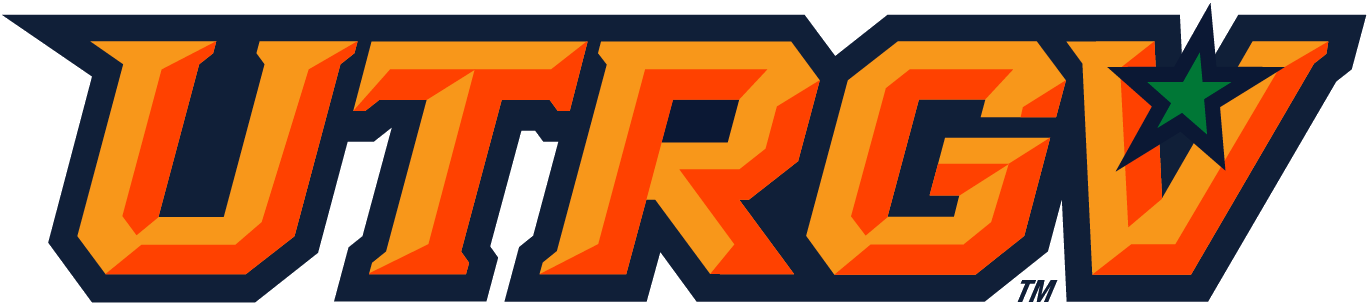

Greenbrier Tip-Off River champions
- Conference: Southland Conference
- Record: 16–15 (8–12 Southland)
- Head coach: Kahil Fennell (1st season)
- Assistant coaches: Dustin Yoder; Daniel Venzant; Anthony Wilkins
- Home arena: UTRGV Fieldhouse

2024–25 Southland Conference men's basketball standings
	Conf.				Overall
Team	W		L	PCT	W		L	PCT
McNeese †	19	–	1	.950	28	–	7	.800
Lamar	14	–	6	.700	20	–	13	.606
Nicholls	13	–	7	.650	20	–	13	.606
Northwestern State	12	–	8	.600	16	–	16	.500
Texas A&M–Corpus Christi	12	–	8	.600	20	–	14	.588
Southeastern Louisiana	12	–	8	.600	18	–	14	.563
Incarnate Word	9	–	11	.450	19	–	17	.528
Houston Christian	9	–	11	.450	12	–	20	.375
UT Rio Grande Valley	8	–	12	.400	16	–	15	.516
Stephen F. Austin	7	–	13	.350	14	–	17	.452
East Texas A&M*	3	–	17	.150	5	–	26	.161
New Orleans	2	–	18	.100	4	–	27	.129
† 2025 Southland tournament winner * ineligible for the 2025 NCAA tournament due to transition period

The 2024–25 UT Rio Grande Valley Vaqueros men's basketball team represented the University of Texas Rio Grande Valley in the 2024–25 NCAA Division I men's basketball season. The season marked the first season as a member of the Southland Conference since leaving the Western Athletic Conference in 2024. They were led by first-year head coach Kahil Fennell and played their home games at UTRGV Fieldhouse as members of the Southland Conference (SLC). The Vaqueros finished the 2024–25 season 16–15, 8–12 in conference play to finish in ninth place. Failing to qualify for the SLC tournament, the Vaqueros' season ended with a 77–76 victory over Southeastern Louisiana.

== Previous season ==
The Vaqueros finished the season 6–25, 2–18 in WAC play to finish in eleventh place, and thus did not qualify to play in the WAC Tournament.

== Preseason polls ==
=== Southland Conference Poll ===
The Southland Conference released its preseason poll on October 16, 2024. Receiving 112 votes overall, the Vaqueros were picked to finish eighth in the conference.

Predicted finish	Team	Votes (1st place)
1	McNeese	242 (21)
2	Stephen F. Austin	208
3	Nicholls	205 (3)
4	Texas A&M–Corpus Christi	191
5	Lamar	143
6	Southeastern	121
7	Incarnate Word	117
8	UT Rio Grande Valley	112
9	Northwestern State	90
10	Texas A&M–Commerce	54
10	New Orleans	54
12	Houston Christian	48

=== Preseason All Conference ===
No Vaqueros were selected to an all–conference team.

== Roster ==
2024–25 Texas–Rio Grande Valley Vaqueros men's basketball team
Players
Coaches

Pos.	#	Name	Height	Weight	Year	Previous school	Hometown
G	0	J.J. Howard	6 ft 5 in (1.96 m)	202 lb (92 kg)	So	Mission College Prep HS	San Luis Obispo, California
G	1	R.J. Nance	6 ft 2 in (1.88 m)	203 lb (92 kg)	Fr	Spring Valley HS	Las Vegas, NV
G	2	Jaylen Washington	5 ft 10 in (1.78 m)	166 lb (75 kg)	Fr	Lake Highland HS	Dallas, Texas
G	3	DK Thorn	6 ft 4 in (1.93 m)	181 lb (82 kg)	GS	Pearland Dawson HS; Alcorn State	Houston, Texas
G	4	R.T. Raimey	6 ft 3 in (1.91 m)	181 lb (82 kg)	Sr	Olathe North HS; College of Southern Idaho; DePaul	Kansas City, Kansas
G	5	Howie Fleming Jr.	6 ft 5 in (1.96 m)	213 lb (97 kg)	RS Jr	Male HS; Illinois State; Winthrop	Louisville, Kentucky
G	10	Cliff Davis	6 ft 2 in (1.88 m)	194 lb (88 kg)	Sr	Thomasville HS; Chipola College; Northwestern State	Thomasville, Georgia
G	11	Justin Mitchell	5 ft 11 in (1.8 m)	146 lb (66 kg)	Fr	Fort Bend Elkins HS	Houston, Texas
F	12	Kwo Agwa	6 ft 6 in (1.98 m)	215 lb (98 kg)	Sr	Kearns HS; State College of Florida; Howard College; East Texas A&M	Calgary, Canada
G	14	Hasan Abdul-Hakim	6 ft 8 in (2.03 m)	215 lb (98 kg)	Sr	Gunn Academy; Santa Fe College; College of Southern Idaho	Toronto, Canada
G	15	Fadi Mougharbel	6 ft 3 in (1.91 m)	194 lb (88 kg)	RS Jr	Beirut, Lebanon; Missouri Valley College
F	21	Marshal Destremau	6 ft 9 in (2.06 m)	234 lb (106 kg)	RS So	Aquinas College; Southern Utah; Clarendon College	Perth, Australia
F	23	Isaiah Barganier	6 ft 7 in (2.01 m)	250 lb (113 kg)	Jr	Fulshear HS	Fulshear, Texas
G	24	EJ Avelar	5 ft 11 in (1.8 m)	160 lb (73 kg)	Fr	Rober Vela HS	Edinburg, Texas
G	25	Trey Miller	6 ft 2 in (1.88 m)	184 lb (83 kg)	Jr	Concordia HS; Incarnate Word; Southern Illinois	Houston, Texas
F	33	Tommy Gankhuyag	6 ft 8 in (2.03 m)	260 lb (118 kg)	So	Centerville HS; Trevecca Nazarene	Ulaanbaatar, Mongolia
F	35	Mustafo Vanjov	7 ft 0 in (2.13 m)	233 lb (106 kg)	Jr	Orangeville Prep; Curry College	Khorog, Tajikistan

Head coach

- Kahil Fennell (Redlands)

Assistant coach(es)

- Dustin Yoder (Illinois)
- Daniel Venzant (St. Edwards)
- Anthony Wilkins (Kent State)

Legend

- (C) Team captain
- (S) Suspended
- (I) Ineligible
- (W) Walk-on
- Injured
- Current redshirt

Roster
Last update: November 19, 2024

== Schedule and results ==
Date time, TV	Rank^{#}	Opponent^{#}	Result	Record	High points	High rebounds	High assists	Site (attendance) city, state
Regular season
November 4, 2024*; 7:00 p.m., B1G+		at Nebraska	L 67–87	0–1	14 – Raimey	7 – Tied	6 – Abdul Hakim	Pinnacle Bank Arena (14,305); Lincoln, NE
November 6, 2024*; 8:00 p.m., FS2		vs. No. 15 Creighton	L 86–99	0–2	26 – Abdul Hakim	11 – Abdul Hakim	4 – Abdul Hakim	CHI Health Center Omaha (15,969); Omaha, NE
November 10, 2024*; 6:30 p.m., ESPN+		Champion Christian	W 110–60	1–2	23 – Raimey	14 – Fleming Jr.	9 – Fleming Jr.	UTRGV Fieldhouse (1,033); Edinburg, TX
November 15, 2024*; 12:00 p.m.		vs. Charleston Southern; Greenbrier Tip-Off River Division Semifinals	W 86–76	2–2	24 – Abdul Hakim	7 – Destremau	4 – Miller	Colonial Hall (275); White Sulphur Springs, WV
November 16, 2024*; 1:30 p.m.		vs. Tennessee Tech; Greenbrier Tip-Off River Division Championship	W 83–58	3–2	15 – Abdul Hakim	9 – Fleming Jr.	4 – Tied	Colonial Hall (218); White Sulphur Springs, WV
November 18, 2024*; 7:00 p.m., BTN		at No. 19 Wisconsin; Greenbrier Tip-Off campus game	L 84–87	3–3	19 – Abdul Hakim	8 – Abdul Hakim	6 – Miller	Kohl Center (13,423); Madison, WI
November 25, 2024*; 6:30 p.m., ESPN+		Le Moyne	W 97–77	4–3	24 – Thorn	9 – Abdul Hakim	7 – Abdul Hakim	UTRGV Fieldhouse (1,658); Edinburg, TX
December 5, 2024; 6:30 p.m., ESPN+		Stephen F. Austin	W 68–65	5–3 (1–0)	20 – Thorn	9 – Davis	8 – Miller	UTRGV Fieldhouse (878); Edinburg, TX
December 7, 2024; 4:30 p.m., ESPN+		Lamar	L 52–84	5–4 (1–1)	10 – Raimey	8 – Fleming Jr.	2 – Tied	UTRGV Fieldhouse (646); Edinburg, TX
December 14, 2024*; 4:30 p.m., ESPN+		Northern New Mexico	W 72–60	6–4	21 – Davis	7 – Tied	6 – Washington	UTRGV Fieldhouse (807); Edinburg, TX
December 18, 2024*; 6:30 p.m., ESPN+		Southern Utah	W 78–73	7–4	21 – T. Miller	11 – H. Fleming, Jr.	7 – T. Miller	UTRGV Fieldhouse (1,637); Edinburg, TX
December 21, 2024*; 2:00 p.m., ESPN+		College of Biblical Studies	W 106–56	8–4	42 – C. Davis	14 – H. Fleming, Jr.	7 – T. Miller	UTRGV Fieldhouse (314); Edinburg, TX
December 30, 2024*; 6:30 p.m., ESPN+		Dallas Christian	W 88–44	9–4	20 – K. Raimey	10 – Tied	7 – J. Washington	UTRGV Fieldhouse (842); Edinbrug, TX
January 4, 2025; 5:00 p.m., ESPN+		at New Orleans	W 76–64	10–4 (2–1)	22 – H. Abdul Hakim	12 – H. Abdul Hakim	4 – Tied	Lakefront Arena (644); New Orleans, LA
January 6, 2025; 6:00 p.m., ESPN+		at Southeastern Louisiana	L 75–79	10–5 (2–2)	14 – C. Davis	12 – H. Fleming Jr.	3 – Tied	University Center (461); Hammond, LA
January 11, 2025; 3:30 p.m., ESPN+		at Texas A&M–Corpus Christi; South Texas Showdown	L 74–79	10–6 (2–3)	20 – H. Abdul-Hakim	8 – H. Fleming, Jr.	5 – H. Abdul-Hakim	American Bank Center (2,526); Corpus Christi, TX
January 13, 2025; 6:30 p.m., ESPN+		East Texas A&M	W 57–55	11–6 (3–3)	16 – H. Fleming Jr.	11 – H. Fleming Jr.	4 – H. Fleming Jr.	UTRGV Fieldhouse (1,286); Edinburg, TX
January 18, 2025; 3:30 p.m., ESPN+		at Houston Christian	L 57–66	11–7 (3–4)	15 – D. Thorne	10 – H. Fleming, Jr.	5 – T. Miller	Sharp Gymnasium (601); Houston, TX
January 20, 2025; 6:30 p.m., ESPN+		at Incarnate Word	W 85–78	12–7 (4–4)	26 – K. Agwa	4 – K. Raimey	6 – T. Miller	McDermott Center (164); San Antonio, TX
January 25, 2025; 4:30 p.m., ESPN+		McNeese	L 63–93	12–8 (4–5)	19 – T. Miller	6 – K. Agwa	3 – T. Miller	UTRGV Fieldhouse (1,473); Edinburg, TX
January 27, 2025; 6:30 p.m., ESPN+		Nicholls	L 75–82	12–9 (4–6)	23 – D. Thorn	12 – K. Agwa	4 – Tied	UTRGV Fieldhouse (1,311); Edinburg, TX
February 1, 2025; 4:30 p.m., ESPN+		Texas A&M–Corpus Christi; South Texas Showdown	W 83–73	13–9 (5–6)	21 – D. Thorn	10 – K. Agwa	4 – G. Clark	UTRGV Fieldhouse (2,734); Edinburg, TX
February 3, 2025; 6:30 p.m., ESPN+		at Northwestern State	L 63–79	13–10 (5–7)	15 – H. Fleming, Jr.	9 – C. Davis	2 – H. Fleming, Jr.	Prather Coliseum (508); Natchitoches, LA
February 8, 2025; 6:00 p.m., ESPN+		at Lamar	L 68–70	13–11 (5–8)	19 – H. Fleming, Jr.	8 – H. Fleming, Jr.	7 – T. Miller	Neches Arena (1,753); Beaumont, TX
February 10, 2025; 6:30 p.m., ESPN+		at Stephen F. Austin	L 75–85	13–12 (5–9)	17 – H. Fleming, Jr.	5 – K. T. Raimey	7 – T. Miller	William R. Johnson Coliseum (1,408); Nacogdoches, TX
February 15, 2025; 4:30 p.m., ESPN+		Houston Christian	W 76–52	14–12 (6–9)	23 – C. Davis	7 – K. Agwa	6 – T. Miller	UTRGV Fieldhouse (1,732); Edinburg, TX
February 17, 2025; 6:30 p.m., ESPN+		at Incarnate Word	L 60–66	14–13 (6–10)	15 – H. Fleming, Jr.	7 – M. Destremau	4 – J. Washington	UTRGV Fieldhouse (1,288); Edinburg, TX
February 22, 2025; 3:00 p.m., ESPN+		at Nicholls	L 84–93	14–14 (6–11)	23 – C. Davis	9 – K. Agwa	6 – T. Miller	Stopher Gymnasium (600); Thibodaux, LA
February 24, 2025; 6:00 p.m., ESPN+		at McNeese	L 65–100	14–15 (6–12)	18 – H. Fleming, Jr.	7 – D. Thorn	5 – C. Davis	The Legacy Center (3,181); Lake Charles, LA
March 1, 2025; 4:30 p.m., ESPN+		New Orleans	W 88–78	15–15 (7–12)	25 – D. Thorn	10 – H. Fleming, Jr.	6 – H. Fleming, Jr.	UTRGV Fieldhouse (1,079); Edinburg, TX
March 3, 2025; 6:30 p.m., ESPN+		Southeastern Louisiana	W 77–76	16–15 (8–12)	20 – C. Davis	8 – K. Agwa	6 – J. Washington	UTRGV Fieldhouse (1,622); Edinburg, TX
*Non-conference game. ^{#}Rankings from AP Poll. (#) Tournament seedings in parentheses. All times are in Central Time.

== Conference awards and honors ==
=== Weekly awards ===
Weekly honors
Honors	Player	Position	Date awarded	Ref.
SLC Men's Basketball Player of the Week	Hasan Abdul Hakim	G	November 18, 2024	
SLC Men's Basketball Player of the Week	Cliff Davis	G	December 30, 2024	

== See also ==
2024–25 UT Rio Grande Valley Vaqueros women's basketball team
