= Kahil Fennell =

American college basketball coach (born 1982)

Current position
- Title: Head coach
- Team: Western Michigan
- Conference: MAC
- Record: 4–1 (.800)

Biographical details
- Born: July 27, 1982 (age 44)
- Education: University of Redlands (2004)

Playing career
- –: Penn State New Kensington
- –: Redlands

Coaching career (HC unless noted)
- 2014–2015: Alameda HS (assistant)
- 2015–2016: UT Permian Basin (assistant)
- 2016–2017: UT Permian Basin (associate HC)
- 2017–2018: Portland State (assistant)
- 2021–2022: Louisville (assistant)
- 2022–2024: BYU (assistant)
- 2024–2026: UTRGV
- 2026–present: Western Michigan

Administrative career (AD unless noted)
- 2018–2021: Louisville (DBO)

Head coaching record
- Overall: 39–30 (.565)

Kahil Fennell (born July 27, 1982) is an American college basketball coach who is currently the head coach for the Western Michigan Broncos. He was previously the head coach at UT Rio Grande Valley from 2024 to 2026.

== Coaching career ==
=== Assistant coach (2014–2024) ===
Fennell started his coaching career as an assistant coach for Alameda High School. In 2015, Fennell joined the University of Texas Permian Basin as an unpaid assistant coach. In 2016, Fennell was promoted by UT Permian Basin to serve as the team's associate head coach.

In 2017, Fennell decided to make the jump to Division I joining the Portland State Vikings as an assistant coach. Fennell's next stop was with the Louisville Cardinals in 2018 as the team's director of operations. In 2021, Louisville promoted Fennell to serve as one of the team's assistant coaches. In 2022, Fennell joined the BYU Cougars as an assistant coach.

=== UTRGV (2024–2026) ===
Fennell got his first career head coaching job in April 2024 when he was hired by the UT Rio Grande Valley Vaqueros.

=== Western Michigan (2026–present) ===
After two seasons and a 35–29 overall record at UTRGV, Fennell accepted the head coaching position at Western Michigan University on March 23, 2026

== Head coaching record ==
Record table
Season	Team	Overall	Conference	Standing	Postseason
UT Rio Grande Valley Vaqueros (Southland Conference) (2024–2026)
2024–25	UT Rio Grande Valley	16–15	8–12	9th	
2025–26	UT Rio Grande Valley	19–14	14–8	3rd	
UT Rio Grande Valley:		35–29 (.547)	22–20 (.524)		
Western Michigan Broncos (Mid-American Conference) (2026–present)
2026–27	Western Michigan	4–1	0–0		
Western Michigan:		4–1 (.800)	0–0 (–)		
Total:		39–30 (.565)			
