= Kevin Palmer (basketball) =

American basketball player (born 1987)

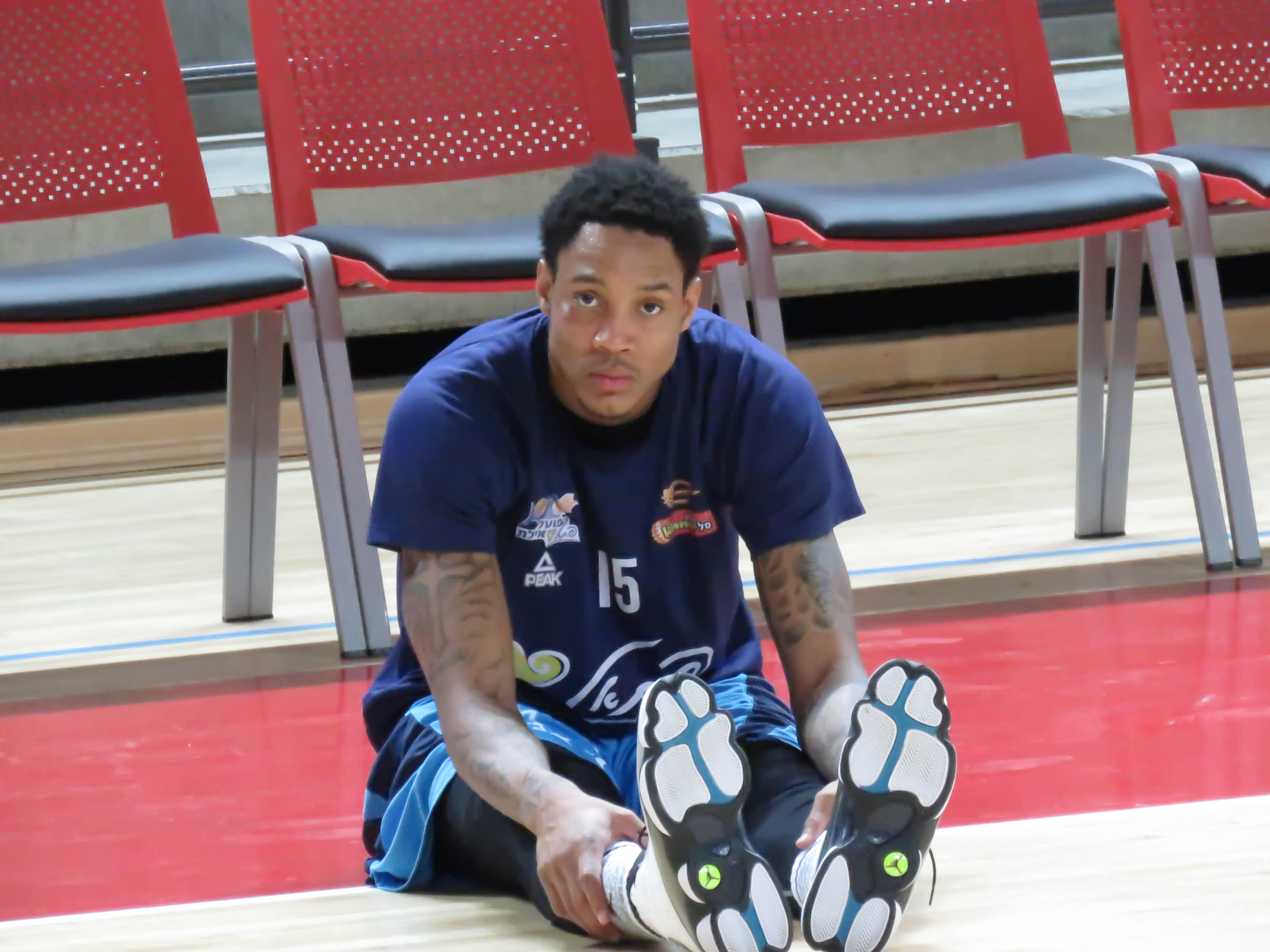
- Palmer with Hapoel Eilat

Personal information
- Born: June 21, 1987 (age 39) Baltimore, Maryland, U.S.
- Listed height: 6 ft 6 in (1.98 m)
- Listed weight: 210 lb (95 kg)

Career information
- High school: Parkville (Parkville, Maryland)
- College: Cecil College (2006–2008); Texas A&M-Corpus Christi (2008–2010)
- NBA draft: 2010: undrafted
- Playing career: 2010–2016
- Position: Small forward

Career history
- 2010–2011: Austin Spurs
- 2011–2012: Rizing Fukuoka
- 2012–2013: KAOD
- 2013–2016: Hapoel Eilat
- 2016: Maccabi Rishon LeZion
- 2016: Akita Northern Happinets

Career highlights
- Israeli League champion (2016); Greek League rebounding leader (2013); Greek League steals leader (2013); bj league Best Five (2011-2012); bj league All-Star (2012); 2× First-team All-Southland (2009, 2010); Southland Newcomer of the Year (2009)

Kevin Palmer (born June 21, 1987) is an American professional basketball player who last played for Akita Northern Happinets of the B.League.

== College career ==
Palmer began his college career at Cecil College. After leading the team with 18 points per game and 80 3-pointers for the season he decided to transfer to Texas A&M-Corpus Christi.

During his senior year with the Texas A&M-Corpus Christi he averaged 19.7 points per game, 5.4 rebounds per game, and 2.4 steals per game.

=== College statistics ===
Year	Team	GP	GS	MPG	FG%	3P%	FT%	RPG	APG	SPG	BPG	PPG
2008–09	Tx A&M-CC	33	33	29.9	.427	.310	.809	5.15	2.85	2.61	0.55	18.15
2009–10	Tx A&M-CC	32	32	32.9	.463	.321	.760	5.44	2.75	2.41	0.28	19.72
Career		65	65	31.4	.445	.315	.783	5.29	2.80	2.51	0.42	18.92

=== NCAA Special Events Stats ===
Year	Team	GP	GS	MPG	FG%	3P%	FT%	RPG	APG	SPG	BPG	PPG
2010	Portsmouth Invitational Tournament	3		25.20	.366	.267	.833	7.7	1.7	3.7	2.3	13.0

=== NCAA Awards & Honors ===
- NABC All-District (23) First Team - 2009, 2010
- All-Southland First Team - 2009, 2010
- Southland All-Tournament Team - 2009
- Southland Newcomer of the Year - 2009

== Professional career ==
On July 15, 2013, Palmer signed to play with Hapoel Eilat after playing for KAO Dramas during the 2012–13 season.

On June 6, 2015, Palmer re-signed with Hapoel Eilat after playing the 2014–2015 season with the team after that he moved to Maccabi Rishon Lezion.

On August 15, 2016, Palmer signed with the Akita Northern Happinets in Japan, replacing Richard Roby.

In the summer of 2017, Palmer played in The Basketball Tournament on ESPN for team A Few Good Men (Gonzaga Alumni). He competed for the $2 million prize, and helped take team A Few Good Men to the Super 16 round, where they then lost to Team Challenge ALS 77–60.

== Career statistics ==
Legend
GP	Games played	GS	Games started	MPG	Minutes per game
FG%	Field goal percentage	3P%	3-point field goal percentage	FT%	Free throw percentage
RPG	Rebounds per game	APG	Assists per game	SPG	Steals per game
BPG	Blocks per game	PPG	Points per game	**Bold**	Career high

=== NBA Summer League Stats ===
Year	Team	GP	GS	MPG	FG%	3P%	FT%	RPG	APG	SPG	BPG	PPG
2010–11	WAS	4	1	17.2	.571	.500	.500	3.00	1.00	0.00	0.00	8.00

=== NBA Preseason Stats ===
Year	Team	GP	GS	MPG	FG%	3P%	FT%	RPG	APG	SPG	BPG	PPG
2010–11	WAS	1	0	4.0	.000	.000	.000	1.00	0.00	0.00	0.00	0.00

=== Regular season ===
†	Denotes seasons in which Palmer won an championship

*	Led the league

Year	Team	GP	GS	MPG	FG%	3P%	FT%	RPG	APG	SPG	BPG	PPG
2010–11	AUS	50	18	25.4	.459	.270	.846	5.04	1.34	1.38	0.56	12.72
2011–12	Fukuoka	52	51	30.6	.492	.321	.722	7.4	2.3	2.5	0.5	21.6
2012–13	KAOD	26	26	29.3	.429	.238	.792	8.31*	2.00	2.38*	0.35	12.73
2013–14	Eilat	37	28	29.2	.472	.326	.735	7.86	2.68	2.81	0.62	12.43
2014–15	Eilat	34	28	29.2	.460	.377	.798	6.00	1.97	1.74	0.35	11.06
2015-16†	Rishon LeZion/Eilat	48	15	21.5	.408	.340	.733	4.02	1.52	1.48	0.23	7.08
2016–17	Akita	29	11	19.0	.433	.346	.667	5.0	1.9	1.6	0.2	12.0

=== Playoffs ===
Year	Team	GP	GS	MPG	FG%	3P%	FT%	RPG	APG	SPG	BPG	PPG
2011-12	Fukuoka	2		34.5	.488	.333	.615	10.0	2.5	5.0	0.0	26.0
2013-14	Eilat	8		34.0	.487	.343	.875	9.1	4.1	2.3	0.6	15.4
2014-15	Eilat	11		25.5	.366	.351	.882	6.1	2.0	1.6	0.2	9.4
2015-16	Rishon LeZion	7		13.0	.300	.308	.583	2.3	1.0	0.6	0.0	3.3

=== International Awards & Honors ===
- Greek HEBA A1 Round 20 MVP - 2012–2013
- Greek HEBA A1 Round 22 MVP - 2012–2013
- Israeli BSL 1st Team - 2013–2014

== Trivia ==
- His hero is Carmelo Anthony.
- He is honored to be decorated on the wall at the new arena of Texas A&M–Corpus Christi Islanders.

== Personal life ==
Palmer is the cousin of Juan and Jermaine Dixon, basketball players.
