= Greenbrier Tip-Off =

American college basketball tournament

Tournament information
- Sport: College basketball
- Location: The Greenbrier, White Sulphur Springs, West Virginia
- Month played: November
- Established: 2024
- Administrator: Intersport
- Teams: 8
- Website: Greenbrier Tip-Off

Current champion
- Butler (Mountain), Kent State (River)

The Greenbrier Tip-Off, operated by IntersportHoops is an early-preseason American college basketball tournament held in November of each year that takes place in White Sulphur Springs, West Virginia at Colonial Hall inside the resort hotel The Greenbrier.

== Champions ==
Year	Division	Champion	Note
2024	Mountain	Wisconsin	
2024	River	UT Rio Grande Valley	
2025	Mountain	Butler	
2025	River	Kent State	

== Brackets ==
* – Denotes overtime period

=== 2025 ===
==== Mountain Division ====
Semifinals; November 21; CBSSN
Butler	79
South Carolina	72
Virginia	83
Northwestern	78

Championship; November 23; CBSSN
Butler	80
Virginia	73
3rd place Game; November 23; CBSSN
South Carolina	77
Northwestern	79

==== River Division ====
Semifinals; November 15; PTB Live
Radford	59
Wright State	92
Cleveland State	95
Kent State	102

Championship; November 16; PTB Live
Wright State	72
Kent State	76
3rd place Game; November 23; CBSSN
Radford	82
Cleveland State	87

=== 2024 ===
==== Campus-site games ====
Home teams listed second.

Campus-site game November 18 (ACCNX)
VMI	48
Pittsburgh	93

Campus-site game November 18 (B1G+)
UT Rio Grande Valley	84
No. 19 Wisconsin	87

Campus-site game November 19 (ESPN+)
Tennessee Tech	69
UCF	80

Campus-site game November 19 (SECN+)
Charleston Southern	68
LSU	77

==== Mountain Division ====
Semifinals; November 22; CBSSN
Pittsburgh	74
LSU	63
19	Wisconsin	86
UCF	70

Championship; November 24; CBSSN
Pittsburgh	75
19	Wisconsin	81
Third Place; CBSSN
LSU	109***
UCF	103

==== River Division ====
Semifinals; November 15
UT Rio Grande Valley	86
Charleston Southern	76
VMI	71
Tennessee Tech	72

Championship; November 16
UT Rio Grande Valley	83
Tennessee Tech	58
Third Place
Charleston Southern	69
VMI	80
