= 2024–25 Texas A&M–Corpus Christi Islanders men's basketball team =

American college basketball season

2024–25 Texas A&M–Corpus Christi Islanders men's basketball
- Conference: Southland Conference
- Record: 20–14 (12–8 Southland)
- Head coach: Jim Shaw (2nd season)
- Assistant coaches: Ralph Davis; Terrence Rencher; Dylan Johnson; Johnathan Bell; Robert Edwards
- Home arena: American Bank Center; Dugan Wellness Center

2024–25 Southland Conference men's basketball standings
	Conf.				Overall
Team	W		L	PCT	W		L	PCT
McNeese †	19	–	1	.950	28	–	7	.800
Lamar	14	–	6	.700	20	–	13	.606
Nicholls	13	–	7	.650	20	–	13	.606
Northwestern State	12	–	8	.600	16	–	16	.500
Texas A&M–Corpus Christi	12	–	8	.600	20	–	14	.588
Southeastern Louisiana	12	–	8	.600	18	–	14	.563
Incarnate Word	9	–	11	.450	19	–	17	.528
Houston Christian	9	–	11	.450	12	–	20	.375
UT Rio Grande Valley	8	–	12	.400	16	–	15	.516
Stephen F. Austin	7	–	13	.350	14	–	17	.452
East Texas A&M*	3	–	17	.150	5	–	26	.161
New Orleans	2	–	18	.100	4	–	27	.129
† 2025 Southland tournament winner * ineligible for the 2025 NCAA tournament due to transition period

The 2024–25 Texas A&M–Corpus Christi Islanders men's basketball team represented Texas A&M University–Corpus Christi in the 2024–25 NCAA Division I men's basketball season as members of the Southland Conference. The Islanders were led by second-year head coach Jim Shaw. Eight home games were scheduled at the Dugan Wellness Center, and ten home games were at American Bank Center. Both arenas were located in Corpus Christi, Texas.

== Previous season ==
The Islanders finished the 2023–24 season 21–12, 14–4 in Southland play to finish in second place. They were defeated by Nicholls in the semifinals of the Southland tournament. They received an invitation to the CIT, where they would fall to Abilene Christian in the first round.

== Preseason polls ==
=== Southland Conference Poll ===
The Southland Conference released its preseason poll on October 16, 2024. Receiving 191 votes overall, the Islanders were picked to finish fourth in the conference.

Predicted finish	Team	Votes (1st place)
1	McNeese	242 (21)
2	Stephen F. Austin	208
3	Nicholls	205 (3)
4	Texas A&M–Corpus Christi	191
5	Lamar	143
6	Southeastern	121
7	Incarnate Word	117
8	UT Rio Grande Valley	112
9	Northwestern State	90
10	Texas A&M–Commerce	54
10	New Orleans	54
12	Houston Christian	48

=== Preseason All Conference ===
Garry Clark was selected as a first team preseason all-conference team member.

== Roster ==
2024–25 Texas A&M–Corpus Christi Islanders men's basketball team
Players
Coaches

Pos.	#	Name	Height	Weight	Year	Previous school	Hometown
G	0	Leo Torbor	6 ft 3 in (1.91 m)	195 lb (88 kg)	Jr	New Mexico Junior College	Brooklyn Park, Minnesota
G	1	Dian Wright-Forde	6 ft 3 in (1.91 m)	210 lb (95 kg)	Sr	Odessa College	Bay Shore, New York
G	2	Jordan Roberts	6 ft 4 in (1.93 m)	170 lb (77 kg)	Sr	South Grand Prairie High School	Grand Prairie, Texas
G	3	Christian Villegas	6 ft 2 in (1.88 m)	155 lb (70 kg)	Sr	Midland College	El Paso, Texas
G	4	Kam Parker	6 ft 2 in (1.88 m)	180 lb (82 kg)	Jr	Independence Community College	Tulsa, Oklahoma
G	5	Damarion Dennis	6 ft 1 in (1.85 m)	165 lb (75 kg)	Fr	Veterans Memorial High School	San Antonio, Texas
F	6	Sheldon Williams	6 ft 8 in (2.03 m)	215 lb (98 kg)	Jr	Coastal Alabama Community College	Atmore, Alabama
F	7	Kayden Crosby	6 ft 7 in (2.01 m)	195 lb (88 kg)	RS So	North Platte Community College	Pflugerville, Texas
G	10	Isaac Williams	6 ft 2 in (1.88 m)	190 lb (86 kg)	Fr	Oak Cliff Faith Family Academy	Oklahoma City, Oklahoma
F	12	Owen Dease	6 ft 8 in (2.03 m)	180 lb (82 kg)	RS Jr	Evansville Reitz High School	Evansville, Indiana
C	13	Shilo Jackson	6 ft 9 in (2.06 m)	210 lb (95 kg)	RS Jr	Vincennes	Indianapolis, Indiana
F	20	Michael Oaks	6 ft 10 in (2.08 m)	220 lb (100 kg)	So	Detroit Mercy	Houston, Texas
G	21	Jaden Walker	6 ft 5 in (1.96 m)	200 lb (91 kg)	RS Sr	East Carolina	Lawrenceville, Georgia
G	22	Kalon Hargrove	5 ft 10 in (1.78 m)	185 lb (84 kg)	Fr	Harlan High School	San Antonio, Texas
G	24	Aaron Potter	6 ft 3 in (1.91 m)	180 lb (82 kg)	Jr	Western Texas College	Tulsa, Oklahoma
C	32	Stephen Giwa	6 ft 9 in (2.06 m)	220 lb (100 kg)	RS Jr	Panola College	Houston, Texas
F	33	Garry Clark	6 ft 8 in (2.03 m)	210 lb (95 kg)	Sr	Tarleton State	St. Louis, Missouri

Head coach

- Jim Shaw (Grinnell)

Assistant coach(es)

- Ralph Davis (Texas A&M–Kingsville)
- Terrence Rencher (Texas)
- Dylan Johnson (Michigan)
- Johnathan Bell (Nicholls State)
- Robert Edwards (Nebraska)

Legend

- (C) Team captain
- (S) Suspended
- (I) Ineligible
- (W) Walk-on
- Injured
- Current redshirt

Roster
Last update: December 3, 2024

== Schedule and results ==
Date time, TV	Rank^{#}	Opponent^{#}	Result	Record	High points	High rebounds	High assists	Site (attendance) city, state
Exhibition
Oct 26, 2024*; 2:00 pm		at Abilene Christian	W 100–86	0–0	18 – J. Roberts	4 – J. Roberts	2 – I. Williams	Moody Coliseum (315); Abilene, TX
Regular season
Nov 4, 2024*; 5:00 pm, BTN		at No. 14 Purdue	L 73–90	0–1	20 – O. Dease	7 – O. Dease	4 – I. Williams	Mackey Arena (14,876); West Lafayette, IN
Nov 4, 2024*; 5:00 pm		Dallas Christian	W 87–36	1–1	16 – S. Williams	7 – S. Jackson	5 – K. Parker	Dugan Wellness Center (1,322); Corpus Christi, TX
Nov 12, 2024*; 8:00 pm		at New Mexico	L 81–100	1–2	19 – G. Clark	7 – O. Dease	7 – O. Dease	The Pit (11,160); Albuquerque, NM
Nov 14, 2024*; 8:30 pm, ESPN+		at New Mexico State	L 82–83	1–3	21 – I. Williams	7 – O. Dease	9 – I. Williams	Pan American Center (4,114); Las Cruces, NM
Nov 21, 2024*; 7:00 pm, ESPN+		UT Martin; Island U Invitational	W 81–77	2–3	16 – J. Roberts	8 – G. Clark	5 – J. Walker	Dugan Wellness Center (1,042); Corpus Christi, TX
Nov 23, 2024*; 3:30 pm, ESPN+		Le Moyne; Island U Invitational	W 82–61	3–3	17 – G. Clark	7 – G. Clark	6 – I. Williams	Dugan Wellness Center (881); Corpus Christi, TX
Nov 26, 2024*; 7:00 pm, ESPN+		Texas Lutheran	W 94–45	4–3	15 – K. Parker	10 – S. Williams	6 – I. Williams	Dugan Wellness Center (1,224); Corpus Christi, TX
Nov 30, 2024*; 3:30 pm, ESPN+		Prairie View A&M	W 109–74	5–3	15 – G. Clark	7 – S. Williams	3 – J. Walker	American Bank Center (1,155); Corpus Christi, TX
Dec 5, 2024; 7:00 pm, ESPN+		Lamar	L 61–65	5–4 (0–1)	14 – G. Clark	5 – G. Clark	3 – O. Dease	Dugan Wellness Center (1,052); Corpus Christi, TX
Dec 7, 2024; 3:30 pm, ESPN+		Stephen F. Austin	W 67–48	6–4 (1–1)	15 – G. Clark	12 – G. Clark	3 – Tied	Dugan Wellness Center (1,138); Corpus Christi, TX
Dec 14, 2024*; 10:59 pm, ESPN+		at Hawaii	L 62–71	6–5	11 – Tied	6 – S. Jackson	5 – G. Clark	Stan Sheriff Center (4,614); Honolulu, HI
Dec 18, 2024*; 11:00 am, ESPN+		Southwestern Adventist	W 117–63	7–5	19 – G. Clark	12 – S. Williams	10 – S. Williams	Dugan Wellness Center (1,400); Corpus Christi, TX
Dec 21, 2024*; 1:00 pm, CBSSN		at No. 15 Houston	L 51–87	7–6	17 – G. Clark	9 – G. Clark	3 – G. Clark	Fertitta Center (7,035); Houston, TX
Dec 29, 2024; 3:30 pm, ESPN+		Schreiner	W 103–44	8–6	19 – J. Roberts	13 – S. Williams	4 – D. Wright-Forde	Dugan Wellness Center (1,015); Corpus Christi, TX
Jan 4, 2025; 3:30 pm, ESPN+		at Southeastern Louisiana	W 80–71	9–6 (2–1)	23 – I. Williams	16 – G. Clark	3 – D. Dennis	Pride Roofing University Center (538); Hammond, LA
Jan 6, 2025; 6:30 pm, ESPN+		at New Orleans	W 97–83	10–6 (3–1)	14 – Tied	8 – S. Giwa	8 – I. Williams	Lakefront Arena (501); New Orleans, LA
Jan 11, 2025; 3:30 pm, ESPN+		UT Rio Grande Valley; South Texas Showdown	W 79–74	11–6 (4–1)	18 – I. Williams	15 – G. Clark	7 – J. Walker	American Bank Center (2,526); Corpus Christ, TX
Jan 13, 2025; 7:00 pm, ESPN+		Northwestern State	W 73–64	12–6 (5–1)	19 – I. Williams	9 – G. Clark	4 – O. Dease	American Bank Center (1,366); Corpus Christ, TX
Jan 18, 2025; 5:00 pm, ESPN+		at Incarnate Word	W 69–63	13–6 (6–1)	16 – G. Clark	10 – G. Clark	3 – J. Walker	McDermott Center (305); San Antonio, TX
Jan 20, 2025; 7:00 pm, ESPN+		at Houston Christian	L 72–76	13–7 (6–2)	14 – J. Roberts	8 – S. Giwa	3 – G. Clark	Sharp Gymnasium (432); Houston, TX
Jan 25, 2025; 3:30 pm, ESPN+		Nicholls	W 61–57	14–7 (7–2)	20 – G. Clark	10 – G. Clark	2 – O. Dease	American Bank Center (2,157); Corpus Christi, TX
Jan 27, 2025; 7:00 pm, ESPN+		McNeese	L 73–74	14–8 (7–3)	22 – Tied	14 – G. Clark	4 – I. Williams	American Bank Center (2,032); Corpus Christi, TX
Feb 1, 2025; 4:30 pm, ESPN+		at UT Rio Grande Valley; South Texas Showdown	L 73–83	14–9 (7–4)	15 – G. Clark	11 – G. Clark	4 – G. Clark	UTRGV Fieldhouse (2,734); Edinburg, TX
Feb 3, 2025; 6:30 pm, ESPN+		at East Texas A&M	W 78–66	15–9 (8–4)	12 – I. Williams	6 – S. Giwa	7 – I.Williams	The Field House (742); Commerce, TX
Feb 8, 2025; 5:00 pm, ESPN+		at Stephen F. Austin	L 64–78	15–10 (8–5)	18 – G. Clark	12 – S. Giwa	3 – I. Williams	William R. Johnson Coliseum (1,371); Nacogdoches, TX
Feb 10, 2025; 7:00 pm, ESPN+		at Lamar	L 56–67	15–11 (8–6)	20 – O. Dease	8 – G. Clark	3 – I. Williams	Neches Arena (1,637); Beaumont, TX
Feb 15, 2025; 3:30 pm, ESPN+		Incarnate Word	W 69–55	16–11 (9–6)	15 – G. Clark	7 – G. Clark	4 – J. Walker	American Bank Center (1,427); Corpus Christi, TX
Feb 17, 2025; 7:00 pm, ESPN+		Houston Christian	W 68–62	17–11 (10–6)	16 – J. Roberts	9 – G. Clark	2 – G. Clark	American Bank Center (1,433); Corpus Christi, TX
Feb 22, 2025; 4:00 pm, ESPN+		at McNeese	L 57–73	17–12 (10–7)	17 – G. Clark	6 – G. Clark	4 – L. Tabor	The Legacy Center (4,032); Lake Charles, LA
Feb 24, 2025; 6:30 pm, ESPN+		at Nicholls	L 69–71	17–13 (10–8)	17 – G. Clark	7 – G. Clark	3 – J. Walker	Stopher Gymnasium (623); Thibodaux, LA
Mar 1, 2025; 4:30 pm, ESPN+		Southeastern Louisiana	W 68–54	18–13 (11–8)	16 – G. Clark	10 – J. Walker	4 – J. Walker	American Bank Center (2,511); Corpus Christi, TX
Mar 3, 2025; 7:00 pm, ESPN+		New Orleans	W 95–62	19–13 (12–8)	17 – O. Dease	6 – K. Parker	5 – L. Torbor	American Bank Center (1,511); Corpus Christi, TX
Southland tournament
Mar 9, 2024; 5:00 pm, ESPN+	(5)	vs. (8) Houston Christian; First round	W 62–48	20–13	22 – G. Clark	11 – G. Clark	4 – Tied	The Legacy Center; Lake Charles, LA
Mar 10, 2024; 5:00 pm, ESPN+	(5)	vs. (4) Northwestern State; Second round	L 63–66	20–14	15 – D. Wright-Forde	7 – G. Clark	4 – J. Walker	The Legacy Center; Lake Charles, LA
*Non-conference game. ^{#}Rankings from AP poll. (#) Tournament seedings in parentheses. All times are in Central.

== See also ==
- 2024–25 Texas A&M–Corpus Christi Islanders women's basketball team
