= Joe Kilgore (basketball) =

American basketball player

Joseph Kilgore
Personal information
- Born: April 25, 1996 (age 30) Houston, Texas
- Listed height: 6 ft 5 in (1.96 m)
- Listed weight: 190 lb (86 kg)

Career information
- High school: Dekaney (Harris County, Texas)
- College: Texas A&M–Corpus Christi (2014–2018)
- NBA draft: 2018: undrafted
- Playing career: 2018–2022
- Position: Shooting guard

Career history
- 2018–2019: Grand Rapids Drive
- 2019: Windy City Bulls
- 2020–2021: Los Prados de Santo Domingo
- 2022: Austin Spurs

Joseph Juwan Kilgore (born April 25, 1996) is an American professional basketball player who last played for the Austin Spurs of the NBA G League. He previously played college basketball at Texas A&M CC.

== High school career ==
Kilgore played four years for Chris Wilson at Dekaney High School where he led the team to a 20–15 record during his senior campaign, helping the squad to a spot in the regional semifinals. He averaged 19 points, five rebounds and four assists for the Wildcats, en route to earning first team all-district and all-region recognition.

== College career ==
In a 79–69 overtime win over Houston Baptist on January 27, 2018, Kilgore became the first player in Texas A&M CC history to record a triple double, with 24 points, 12 rebounds and 11 assists. He had a career-high 36 points in the final regular season game against Houston Baptist. As a senior, he averaged 18.3 points per game, earning him Second Team All-Southland Conference Honors. At the conclusion of the season he was selected to the College Slam Dunk Championship, where he was crowned the slam dunk champion. He averaged 9.9 points, 3.4 rebounds and 1.9 assists per game in 122 games for the Islanders.

== Professional career ==
Kilgore was drafted by the Harlem Globetrotters in June 2018. He was selected by the Windy City Bulls with the 12th pick in the 2018 G League draft. He was signed by the Grand Rapids Drive after a season-ending injury to Scottie Lindsey in December. In 2020, he signed with Los Prados de Santo Domingo in the Dominican Republic.

=== Austin Spurs ===
On October 27, 2021, Kilgore signed with the Austin Spurs. However, he was waived two days later.

On January 1, 2022, Kilgore was acquired by the Austin Spurs via the available player pool. Kilgore was later waived on January 13, 2022.
