= Dugan Wellness Center =

Stadium in Corpus Christi, Texas

- Interactive map of Dugan Wellness Center
- Location: 6300 Ocean Drive, Corpus Christi, Texas 78412, United States
- Coordinates: 27°42′41.3″N 97°19′27.7″W
- Owner: Texas A&M University–Corpus Christi
- Operator: Texas A&M University–Corpus Christi
- Capacity: 1,200

Construction
- Built: 2007–2009
- Opened: January 24, 2009
- Cost: Original: $21 million

Tenants
- Texas A&M–Corpus Christi Islanders women's volleyball team Texas A&M–Corpus Christi Islanders men's basketball Texas A&M–Corpus Christi Islanders women's basketball

Dugan Wellness Center, opened in January, 2009, is located on the campus of Texas A&M University–Corpus Christi in Corpus Christi, Texas, United States. With an area of 67,000 square feet (6,200 m^{2}), the center is the recreation home for students attending the university. In addition, the center has been the home of the NCAA Division I Texas A&M–Corpus Christi Islanders women's volleyball team since it opened. The Islanders men's and women's basketball teams have used the venue as their home court for some games since opening. Other home games are at the off-campus American Bank Center. The facility was named after Jack and Susie Dugan. The Dugans donated the lead gift of $1 million toward the building's $21 million construction cost in 2007. The ribbon cutting opening ceremony and first men's basketball game at the facility were held on January 24, 2009.

== Facility features ==
The facility has two NCAA regulation basketball courts and a 9,000-square-foot (840 m^{2}) strength and conditioning facility. It also has two multipurpose rooms for classes and two floors of workout equipment.

== Southland Conference tournaments ==
The 2013, 2017, and 2021 Southland Conference women's volleyball tournaments were held at the Dugan Wellness Center, with the Islanders winning the 2021 tournament.
