= Texas A&M–Corpus Christi Islanders men's basketball =

College basketball team

Texas A&M–Corpus Christi Islanders
2025–26 Texas A&M–Corpus Christi Islanders men's basketball team
- University: Texas A&M University–Corpus Christi
- Head coach: Jim Shaw (3rd season)
- Location: Corpus Christi, Texas
- Arena: American Bank Center (capacity: 8,500)
- Conference: Southland
- Nickname: Islanders
- Colors: Royal blue, white, and green

NCAA Division I tournament appearances
- 2007, 2022, 2023

Conference tournament champions
- 2007, 2022, 2023

Conference regular-season champions
- 2007, 2023

Conference division champions
- Southland West: 2007

The Texas A&M–Corpus Christi Islanders is the basketball team that represent Texas A&M University–Corpus Christi in Corpus Christi, Texas, United States. The school's team currently competes in the Southland Conference. The team last played in the NCAA Division I men's basketball tournament in 2023. The Islanders are coached by Jim Shaw. The school's first season of basketball was 1999–2000.

== Coaching ==
- Head coach - Jim Shaw
- Assistant coach - Ralph Davis II

=== Former coaches ===
- Ronnie Arrow
- Perry Clark
- Willis Wilson
- Steve Lutz

== Postseason results ==
=== NCAA tournament results ===
The Islanders have appeared in the NCAA tournament three times. Their combined record is 1–3.

Year	Seed	Round	Opponent	Result
2007	#15	First Round	#2 Wisconsin	L 63–76
2022	#16	First Four	#16 Texas Southern	L 67–76
2023	#16	First Four; First Round	#16 Southeast Missouri State #1 Alabama	W 75–71; L 75–96

=== CIT results ===
The Islanders have appeared in the CollegeInsider.com Postseason Tournament (CIT) five times. Their combined record is 6–5.

Year	Round	Opponent	Result
2014	First Round; Second Round	Northern Colorado; Pacific	W 82–71; L 60–89
2015	First Round; Second Round	Florida Gulf Coast; Kent State	W 75–69; L 65–69
2016	First Round	Louisiana–Lafayette	L 72–96
2017	First Round; Second Round; Quarterfinals; Semifinals; Championship Game	Georgia State; Weber State; Fort Wayne; UMBC; Saint Peter's	W 80–64; W 82–73; W 78–62; W 79–61; L 61–62
2024	First Round	Abilene Christian	L 63–73
