= 2023–24 Sun Belt Conference men's basketball season =

- League: NCAA Division I
- Sport: Basketball
- Duration: November 6, 2023 – March 1, 2024
- Number of teams: 14
- TV partner(s): ESPN

2023–24 NCAA Division I men's basketball season
- Regular season champions: Appalachian State
- Season MVP: Terrence Edwards Jr., James Madison

Tournament
- Champions: James Madison
- Runners-up: Arkansas State

Basketball seasons
- ← 2022–23 2024–25 →

2023–24 Sun Belt Conference men's basketball standings
	Conf.				Overall
Team	W		L	PCT	W		L	PCT
Appalachian State	16	–	2	.889	27	–	7	.794
James Madison †	15	–	3	.833	32	–	4	.889
Troy	13	–	5	.722	20	–	12	.625
Arkansas State	11	–	7	.611	20	–	17	.541
Louisiana	10	–	8	.556	19	–	14	.576
Southern Miss	9	–	9	.500	16	–	16	.500
Georgia State	8	–	10	.444	14	–	17	.452
South Alabama	8	–	10	.444	16	–	16	.500
Georgia Southern	8	–	10	.444	9	–	24	.273
Marshall	7	–	11	.389	13	–	20	.394
Texas State	7	–	11	.389	17	–	18	.486
Louisiana–Monroe	6	–	12	.333	11	–	19	.367
Coastal Carolina	5	–	13	.278	9	–	22	.290
Old Dominion	3	–	15	.167	7	–	25	.219
† 2024 Sun Belt tournament winner

The 2023–24 Sun Belt Conference men's basketball season was the season for Sun Belt Conference men's basketball teams that began with practices in October 2023, followed by the start of the 2023–24 NCAA Division I men's basketball season in November. Conference play began in December 2023, and concluded on March 2, 2024. The 2024 Sun Belt Conference men's basketball tournament took place from March 5–11, 2024, at the Pensacola Bay Center in Pensacola, Florida.

== Head coaches ==
=== Coaching changes ===
==== Arkansas State ====
On March 22, 2023, former Alabama assistant coach Bryan Hodgson was named the new head coach of the Red Wolves.

==== Coastal Carolina ====
Head coach Cliff Ellis retired on December 6, 2023, after 17 seasons with the Chanticleers. Assistant coach Benny Moss was named interim head coach for the rest of the season.

==== Georgia Southern ====
After head coach Brian Burg left to coach Ole Miss, on March 14, 2023, former Alabama assistant coach Charlie Henry was named head coach.

==== Old Dominion ====
Jeff Jones resigned after the ninth game of the season following a heart attack he had on December 20, 2023. Special assistant coach Kieran Donohue was named interim head coach for the rest of the season. Jones retired from coaching on February 26, 2024.

=== Coaches ===
Team	Head coach	Previous job	Years at school	Overall record	Sun Belt record	Sun Belt titles	Sun Belt Tournament titles	NCAA Tournaments
Appalachian State	Dustin Kerns	Presbyterian	5	97–65 (.599)	55–35 (.611)	1	1	1
Arkansas State	Bryan Hodgson	Alabama (Asst.)	1	20–16 (.556)	11–7 (.611)	0	0	0
Coastal Carolina	Cliff Ellis	Auburn	15	297–227 (.567)	57–65 (.467)	0	0	2
Coastal Carolina	Benny Moss (interim)	Coastal Carolina (Asst.)	13	5–13 (.278)	5–16 (.238)	0	0	0
Georgia Southern	Charlie Henry	Alabama (Asst.)	1	8–23 (.258)	8–10 (.444)	0	0	0
Georgia State	Jonas Hayes	Xavier (Assoc.)	2	24–38 (.387)	11–25 (.306)	0	0	0
James Madison	Mark Byington	Georgia Southern	4	82–36 (.695)	41–23 (.641)	0	1	1
Louisiana	Bob Marlin	Sam Houston	14	265–188 (.585)	150–103 (.593)	1	1	1
Louisiana–Monroe	Keith Richard	LSU (Asst.)	14	163–271 (.376)	91–165 (.355)	0	0	0
Marshall	Dan D'Antoni	Los Angeles Lakers (Asst.)	10	177–148 (.545)	95–81 (.540)	0	0	1
Old Dominion	Jeff Jones	American	11	203–131 (.608)	11–7 (.611)	0	0	1
Old Dominion	Kieran Donohue (interim)	Old Dominion (Special asst. coach)	11	4–18 (.182)	3–15 (.167)	0	0	0
South Alabama	Richie Riley	Nicholls State	6	110–83 (.570)	57–50 (.533)	0	0	0
Southern Miss	Jay Ladner	Southeastern Louisiana	5	65–88 (.425)	33–57 (.367)	0	0	0
Texas State	Terrence Johnson	Texas State (Asst.)	4	69–51 (.575)	37–29 (.561)	2	0	0
Troy	Scott Cross	TCU (Asst.)	5	80–76 (.513)	43–45 (.489)	0	0	0

== Preseason ==
=== Preseason Coaches Poll ===
On October 16, 2023, the conference announced a preseason conference poll as voted on by the league's 14 head coaches.

Rank	Team
1.	James Madison (7)
2.	Appalachian State (2)
3.	Old Dominion (1)
4.	Southern Miss
5.	Louisiana (2)
6.	South Alabama (2)
7.	Marshall
8.	Troy
9.	Arkansas State
10.	Texas State
11.	Georgia State
12.	Coastal Carolina
13.	Georgia Southern
14.	Louisiana–Monore

==== Preseason Awards ====
The conference also announced preseason All-SBC teams.

==== Sun Belt preseason player of the year ====
- Austin Crowley – Southern Miss

==== Preseason All-Sun Belt teams ====
2023-24 Sun Belt Men's Basketball Preseason All-Conference Teams
First Team	Second Team	Third Team
Austin Crowley – Southern Miss; Terrence Edwards Jr. – JMU; Donovan Gregory – Appalachian State; Chaunce Jenkins – Old Dominion; Christyon Eugene – Troy; Themus Fulks – Louisiana	Tyrell Jones – South Alabama; Kamdyn Curfman – Marshall; Tyreke Locure – Louisiana–Monroe; Dwan Odom – Georgia State; Obinna Anochili-Killen – Marshall	Terrance Ford Jr. – Arkansas State; Brenden Tucker – Georgia State; C. J. Huntley – Appalachian State; Freddy Hicks – Arkansas State; Aamer Muhammad – Troy

== Regular season ==
=== Early season tournaments ===
Team	Tournament	Finish
Appalachian State	Fort Myers Tip-Off	1st (Palms Division)
Arkansas State	Acrisure Invitational	3rd
Coastal Carolina	Myrtle Beach Invitational	8th
Georgia Southern	TowneBank Holiday Classic	4th
Georgia State	Capitol Challenge	3rd
James Madison	Cancún Challenge	1st (Rivera Division)
Louisiana	Gulf Coast Showcase	5th
Marshall	Cayman Islands Classic	6th
Old Dominion	Diamond Head Classic	6th
South Alabama	Jaguar Classic	1st
Southern Miss	Jacksonville Classic	4th
Texas State	Louisiana Tech MTE	–
Troy	Trojan Classic	1st

=== Player of the week ===
Week	Player(s) of the Week	School
Nov 13	Terrence Edwards Jr.	James Madison
Nov 20	Freddy Hicks	Arkansas State
Nov 27	Kobe Julien	Louisiana
Dec 4	Kobe Julien (2)	Louisiana
Dec 11	T. J. Bickerstaff	James Madison
Dec 18	Jordan Mason	Texas State
Dec 25	Terrence Edwards Jr. (2)	James Madison
Jan 1	T. J. Bickerstaff (2)	James Madison
Jan 8	André Curbelo	Southern Miss
Jan 15	Caleb Fields	Arkansas State
Jan 22	Tre'Von Spillers	Appalachian State
Jan 29	Nate Martin	Marshall
Feb 5	Caleb Fields (2)	Arkansas State
Feb 12	Victor Iwuakor	Southern Miss
Feb 19	Terrence Edwards Jr. (3)	James Madison
Feb 26	Samuel Tabe	South Alabama
March 4	Tyren Moore	Georgia Southern

=== Records against other conferences ===
Power 6 Conferences
Conference	Record
ACC	1–1
Big East	0–0
Big Ten	1–4
Big 12	0–6
Pac–12	0–2
SEC	1–7
Combined	3–20
Other NCAA Division I Conferences	Record
America East	0–0
American	4–5
ASUN	5–7
Atlantic 10	0–3
Big Sky	0–0
Big South	5–2
Big West	1–1
CAA	3–7
Conference USA	2–6
Horizon	2–2
Independents/Non-Division I	0–0
Ivy	0–1
MAAC	0–0
MAC	16–12
MEAC	3–1
Missouri Valley	2–2
Mountain West	1–1
Northeast	0–0
OVC	4–2
Patriot	0–0
Southern	3–4
Southland	2–5
SWAC	5–0
Summit	1–1
West Coast	0–2
WAC	2–0
Combined	61–64

== Postseason ==
=== Sun Belt tournament ===
First round Tuesday, March 5 ESPN+
12	Louisiana–Monroe	71
13	Coastal Carolina	75
11	Texas State	92*
14	Old Dominion	83

Second round Thursday, March 7 ESPN+
8	South Alabama	71
9	Georgia Southern	76
5	Louisiana	80
13	Coastal Carolina	66
7	Georgia State	74
10	Marshall	86
6	Southern Miss	59
11	Texas State	75

Quarterfinals; Saturday, March 9 ESPN+
1	Appalachian State	85*
9	Georgia Southern	80
4	Arkansas State	89
5	Louisiana	62
2	James Madison	81
10	Marshall	64
3	Troy	68
11	Texas State	74

Semifinals; Sunday, March 10; ESPN+
1	Appalachian State	65
4	Arkansas State	67
2	James Madison	73
11	Texas State	68

Championship; Monday, March 11; ESPN2
4	Arkansas State	71
2	James Madison	91

* – Denotes overtime period

=== NCAA tournament ===
Seed	Region	School	First Four	1st round	2nd round
12	South	James Madison	Bye	W 72–61 #5 Wisconsin – (Brooklyn, NY)	L 55–93 #4 Duke – Brooklyn, NY)
		W–L (%):	0–0 (–)	1–0 (1.000)	0–1 (.000) Total: 1–1 (.500)

=== National Invitation Tournament ===
Seed	Bracket	School	1st round
—	Wake Forest	Appalachian State	L 76–87 #1 Wake Forest – (Winston-Salem, NC)
	W–L (%):	0–1 (.000)	0–1 (.000) Total: 0–1 (.000)

=== College Basketball Invitational ===
Seed	School	1st round	Quarterfinals	Semifinals
4	Arkansas State	W 86–85 #13 Bethune–Cookman – (Daytona Beach, FL)	W 74–61 #4 Montana – (Daytona Beach, FL)	L 80–81 #1 High Point – (Daytona Beach, FL)
	W–L (%):	1–0 (1.000)	1–0 (1.000)	0–1 (.000) Total: 2–1 (.667)

== Honors and awards ==
=== Sun Belt Awards ===
2023-24 Sun Belt Men's Basketball Individual Awards
Award	Recipient(s)
Player of the Year	Terrence Edwards Jr. – James Madison
Coach of the Year	Dustin Kerns – Appalachian State
Defensive Player of the Year	Justin Abson - Appalachian State
Newcomer of the Year	T. J. Bickerstaff – James Madison
Freshman of the Year	Myles Rigsby – Troy
Sixth Man Award	Tayton Conerway – Troy

2023-24 Sun Belt Men's Basketball All-Conference Teams
First Team	Second Team	Third Team
Terrence Edwards Jr. - James Madison; Christyon Eugene – Troy; Caleb Fields – Arkansas State; Donovan Gregory – Appalachian State; Tre'Von Spillers – Appalachian State	T. J. Bickerstaff – James Madison; Austin Crowley – Southern Miss; Chaunce Jenkins – Old Dominion; Kobe Julien – Louisiana; Tyren Moore — Georgia Southern	Joe Charles – Louisiana; Noah Freidel – James Madison; Terence Harcum – Appalachian State; Hosana Kitenge – Louisiana; Nika Metskhvarishvili – Louisiana–Monroe; John Ojiako – Coastal Carolina; Taryn Todd – Arkansas State
