= List of James Madison Dukes men's basketball head coaches =

The following is a list of James Madison Dukes men's basketball head coaches. There have been 12 head coaches of the Dukes in their history.

James Madison's current head coach is Preston Spradlin. He was hired as the Dukes' head coach in March 2024, replacing Mark Byington, who took the head coaching job at Vanderbilt after the 2023–24 season.

No.	Tenure	Coach	Years	Record	Pct.
1	1969–1971	Charles Branscom	2	20–17	.541
2	1971–1972	Dean Ehlers	1	16–7	.696
3	1972–1985	Lou Campanelli	13	238–118	.669
4	1985–1988 (Note: Thurston resigned in January 1988. Tom McCorry served as interim head coach for the remainder of the 1987–88 season.)	John Thurston	3	31–44	.413
5	1988*	Tom McCorry	1	4–7	.364
6	1988–1997	Lefty Driesell	9	159–111	.589
7	1997–2004	Sherman Dillard	7	93–106	.467
8	2004–2008	Dean Keener	4	31–85	.267
9	2008–2016	Matt Brady	8	139–127	.523
10	2016–2020	Louis Rowe	4	34–64	.347
11	2020–2024	Mark Byington	3	82–36	.695
12	2024–present	Preston Spradlin	2	20–12	.625
Totals		12 coaches	56 seasons	867–734	.542
Records updated through end of 2024–25 season * - Denotes interim head coach. Source
