= 2023–24 South Alabama Jaguars men's basketball team =

American college basketball season

2023–24 South Alabama Jaguars men's basketball
- Conference: Sun Belt Conference
- Record: 16–16 (8–10 Sun Belt)
- Head coach: Richie Riley (6th season)
- Assistant coaches: Rodney Crawford; Orin Bailey Jr.; Riley Conroy; Mikel Kosich (Ast/Chief of Staff)
- Home arena: Mitchell Center

2023–24 Sun Belt Conference men's basketball standings
	Conf.				Overall
Team	W		L	PCT	W		L	PCT
Appalachian State	16	–	2	.889	27	–	7	.794
James Madison †	15	–	3	.833	32	–	4	.889
Troy	13	–	5	.722	20	–	12	.625
Arkansas State	11	–	7	.611	20	–	17	.541
Louisiana	10	–	8	.556	19	–	14	.576
Southern Miss	9	–	9	.500	16	–	16	.500
Georgia State	8	–	10	.444	14	–	17	.452
South Alabama	8	–	10	.444	16	–	16	.500
Georgia Southern	8	–	10	.444	9	–	24	.273
Marshall	7	–	11	.389	13	–	20	.394
Texas State	7	–	11	.389	17	–	18	.486
Louisiana–Monroe	6	–	12	.333	11	–	19	.367
Coastal Carolina	5	–	13	.278	9	–	22	.290
Old Dominion	3	–	15	.167	7	–	25	.219
† 2024 Sun Belt tournament winner

The 2023–24 South Alabama Jaguars men's basketball team represented the University of South Alabama in the 2023–24 NCAA Division I men's basketball season. The Jaguars, led by sixth-year head coach Richie Riley, played their home games at the Mitchell Center in Mobile, Alabama as members in the Sun Belt Conference. They finished the season 16–16, 8–10 in Sun Belt play to finish in a three-way tie for seventh place. As the No. 8 seed in the Sun Belt tournament, they lost to Georgia Southern in the second round.

== Previous season ==
The Jaguars finished the 2022–23 season 19–16, 9–9 in Sun Belt play to finish in a tie for seventh place. In the Sun Belt tournament, they lost in the championship round to Louisiana.

== Offseason ==
=== Departures ===
Name	Number	Pos.	Height	Weight	Year	Hometown	Reason for departure
Jamar Franklin	1	G	6'2"	175	Freshman	Rockledge, FL	Transferred to Georgia Southern
Isaiah Moore	4	G	6'1"	190	GS Senior	Temple Hills, MD	Graduated; Signed to play with the Iowa Wolves
Diante Smith	10	F	6'7"	200	Junior	Fort Walton Beach, FL	Transferred to Nicholls
Adam Sizemore	14	G	5'10"	170	Senior	London, KY	Graduated; Promoted to Director of Player Development
Kevin Samuel	21	C	7'0"	260	GS Senior	Codrington Village, Barbuda	Graduated; Signed to play with Aix Maurienne Savoie Basket
Owen White	22	G	6'6"	215	GS Senior	Rhinelander, WI	Graduated
Tyler Shirley	24	F	6'7"	205	Sophomore	Gary, IN	Transferred to Clayton State (D2)

=== Incoming transfers ===
Name	Number	Pos.	Height	Weight	Year	Hometown	Previous School
Isiah Gaiter	2	G	6'3"	195	GS Senior	Meriden, CT	Assumption
Maxwell Land	10	G	6'4"	195	Junior	Cincinnati, OH	Saint Francis (PA)
Thomas Howell	13	F	6'8"	230	Junior	Natchitoches, LA	Louisiana–Monroe
Samuel Tabe	45	G	6'5"	210	GS Senior	Beltsville, MD	Seton Hill

=== Recruiting classes ===
==== 2023 recruiting class ====
College recruiting information
Name	Hometown	School	Height	Weight	Commit date
John Broom; SG	Jacksonville, AL	Jacksonville School	6 ft 5 in (1.96 m)	170 lb (77 kg)	Jul 28, 2022
John Broom; SG	Recruit ratings: 247Sports:				
Smurf Millender; PG	Friendswood, TX	Clear Brook High School	5 ft 9 in (1.75 m)	160 lb (73 kg)	Jun 10, 2022
Smurf Millender; PG	Recruit ratings: No ratings found				
Ethan Kizer; SF	Metamora, IL	Metamora High School	6 ft 5 in (1.96 m)	175 lb (79 kg)	Sep 9, 2022
Ethan Kizer; SF	Recruit ratings: No ratings found				
Overall recruit ranking:
Note: In many cases, Scout, Rivals, 247Sports, On3, and ESPN may conflict in their listings of height and weight.; In these cases, the average was taken. ESPN grades are on a 100-point scale.; Sources: "2023 Team Ranking". Rivals.

== Preseason ==
=== Preseason Sun Belt Conference poll ===
The Jaguars were picked to finish in sixth place in the conference's preseason poll. Senior guard Tyrell Jones was named to the preseason All-SBC Second Team.

Coaches poll
Predicted finish	Team (1st place Votes)
1	James Madison - 176 (7)
2	App State - 159 (2)
3	Old Dominion - 154 (1)
4	Southern Miss - 148
5	Louisiana - 136 (2)
6	South Alabama - 129 (2)
7	Marshall - 119
8	Troy - 91
9	Arkansas State - 84
10	Texas State - 72
11	Georgia State - 69
12	Coastal Carolina - 59
13	Georgia Southern - 42
14	ULM - 32

== Roster ==
2023–24 South Alabama Jaguars men's basketball team
Players
Coaches

Pos.	#	Name	Height	Weight	Year	Previous school	Hometown
G	0	Tyrell Jones	6 ft 2 in (1.88 m)	190 lb (86 kg)	Sr	West Oaks Academy (FL); Auburn	Chicago, IL
G	2	Isiah Gaiter	6 ft 3 in (1.91 m)	195 lb (88 kg)	Sr	Sacred Heart HS; Assumption	Meriden, CT
F	3	Elijah Ormiston	6 ft 8 in (2.03 m)	220 lb (100 kg)	Jr	Cannon HS; Concordia-St. Paul	Minneapolis, MN
G	4	Marcus Millender	5 ft 11 in (1.8 m)	180 lb (82 kg)	Fr	Clear Brook HS	Houston, TX
G	10	Maxwell Land	6 ft 4 in (1.93 m)	195 lb (88 kg)	Jr	Archbishop Moeller HS; Saint Francis (PA)	Cincinnati, OH
F	12	Julian Margrave	6 ft 10 in (2.08 m)	205 lb (93 kg)	So	New Hampton School	Louisburg, KS
F	13	Thomas Howell	6 ft 8 in (2.03 m)	230 lb (104 kg)	Jr	St. Mary's HS; Louisiana–Monroe	Natchitoches, Louisiana
G	14	John Broom	6 ft 5 in (1.96 m)	190 lb (86 kg)	Fr	Jacksonville HS	Jacksonville, AL
F	20	Marshall Kearing	6 ft 9 in (2.06 m)	235 lb (107 kg)	Sr	Willetton Senior HS; State College of Florida	Pinjarra, Australia
F	21	Ethan Kizer	6 ft 5 in (1.96 m)	195 lb (88 kg)	Fr	Metamora HS	Metamora, IL
F	25	Judah Brown	6 ft 6 in (1.98 m)	225 lb (102 kg)	Jr	Pacifica Christian HS; Saint Mary's	Bermuda Dunes, CA
G	45	Samuel Tabe	6 ft 5 in (1.96 m)	210 lb (95 kg)	GS	High Point HS; Seton Hill	Beltsville, MD

Head coach

- Richie Riley (Eastern Kentucky)

Assistant coach(es)

- Rodney Crawford (Cincinnati)
- Orin Bailey Jr.(Houston)
- Riley Conroy (Tulane)
- Mikel Kosich (Montana State Billings)

Legend

- (C) Team captain
- (S) Suspended
- (I) Ineligible
- (W) Walk-on
- Injured
- Current redshirt

Roster

== Schedule and results ==
Date time, TV	Rank^{#}	Opponent^{#}	Result	Record	High points	High rebounds	High assists	Site (attendance) city, state
Non-conference regular season
November 6, 2023*; 7:00 p.m.		Mobile	L 74–83	0–1	21 – Brown	7 – Howell	4 – Gaiter	Mitchell Center (2,153); Mobile, AL
November 11, 2023*; 1:00 p.m.		at Buffalo; MAC-SBC Challenge	W 70–56	1–1	15 – Millender	10 – Howell	4 – Millender	Alumni Arena (2,080); Amherst, NY
November 14, 2023*; 7:00 p.m.		at No. 22 Alabama	L 46–102	1–2	15 – Land	5 – Tabe	3 – Millender	Coleman Coliseum (9,828); Tuscaloosa, AL
November 16, 2023*; 7:00 p.m.		Nicholls; Jaguar Classic	L 97–102 ^{3OT}	1–3	23 – Millender	9 – Millender	10 – Millender	Mitchell Center (3,445); Mobile, AL
November 17, 2023*; 3:00 p.m.		Denver; Jaguar Classic	W 82–75	2–3	24 – Gaiter	11 – Howell	9 – Millender	Mitchell Center (1,357); Mobile, AL
November 19, 2023*; 12:00 p.m.		SIU Edwardsville; Jaguar Classic	W 86–74	3–3	24 – Gaiter	6 – Howell	5 – Millender	Mitchell Center (1,507); Mobile, AL
November 21, 2023*; 7:00 p.m.		Lynn	W 74–62	4–3	17 – Land	8 – Gaiter	2 – Kearing	Mitchell Center (1,439); Mobile, AL
November 25, 2023*; 6:00 p.m., BTN		at Maryland	L 55–68	4–4	18 – Margrave	7 – Land	2 – Land	Xfinty Center (12,358); College Park, MD
November 30, 2023*; 6:00 p.m., ESPN+		at Jacksonville State	L 52–70	4–5	15 – Jones	7 – Howell	1 – Tied	Pete Mathews Coliseum (1,865); Jacksonville, AL
December 6, 2023*; 10:00 a.m.		at Mercer	W 83–62	5–5	17 – Gaiter	8 – Margrave	4 – Millender	Hawkins Arena (3,207); Macon, GA
December 9, 2023*; 3:00 p.m.		Spring Hill	W 91–74	6–5	20 – Gaiter	8 – Tied	6 – Tied	Mitchell Center (1,931); Mobile, AL
December 21, 2023*; 7:00 p.m., ESPN+		Alabama A&M	W 83–67	7–5	18 – Jones	11 – Howell	3 – Jones	Mitchell Center (1,069); Mobile, AL
Sun Belt Conference regular season
December 30, 2023; 6:00 p.m., ESPN+		at Old Dominion	W 61–59	8–5 (1–0)	16 – Gaiter	9 – Howell	7 – Gaiter	Chartway Arena (5,479); Norfolk, VA
January 4, 2024; 7:00 p.m., ESPN+		Appalachian State	L 84–91 ^{OT}	8–6 (1–1)	29 – Gaiter	10 – Howell	4 – Tied	Mitchell Center (1,646); Mobile, AL
January 6, 2024; 3:00 p.m., ESPN+		Georgia State	L 76–90	8–7 (1–2)	22 – Jones	17 – Howell	2 – Tied	Mitchell Center (2,141); Mobile, AL
January 11, 2024; 6:00 p.m.		at James Madison	L 55–89	8–8 (1–3)	16 – Gaiter	7 – Ormiston	3 – Jones	Atlantic Union Bank Center (3,147); Harrisonburg, VA
January 13, 2024; 6:00 p.m., ESPN+		at Marshall	W 91–85	9–8 (2–3)	25 – Gaiter	8 – Tied	5 – Tied	Cam Henderson Center (5,711); Huntington, WV
January 18, 2024; 7:00 p.m., ESPN+		Troy	W 74–71	10–8 (3–3)	19 – Tabe	7 – Tabe	5 – Tabe	Mitchell Center (3,169); Mobile, AL
January 20, 2024; 3:00 p.m., ESPN+		Louisiana	L 79–88	10–9 (3–4)	25 – Gaiter	6 – Ormiston	4 – Jones	Mitchell Center (2,991); Mobile, AL
January 25, 2024; 7:30 p.m., ESPN+		at Louisiana–Monroe	L 66–80	10–10 (3–5)	18 – Jones	9 – Howell	5 – Jones	Fant–Ewing Coliseum (1,600); Monroe, LA
January 27, 2024; 4:00 p.m., ESPN+		at Troy	L 79–83	10–11 (3–6)	19 – Jones	6 – Tied	3 – Jones	Trojan Arena (5,110); Troy, AL
February 1, 2024; 7:00 p.m., ESPN+		at Texas State	L 66–74	10–12 (3–7)	16 – Jones	9 – Howell	5 – Millender	Strahan Arena (1,699); San Marcos, TX
February 3, 2024; 7:00 p.m., ESPN+		at Louisiana	L 60–80	10–13 (3–8)	18 – Jones	6 – Gaiter	4 – Jones	Cajundome (1,873); Lafayette, LA
February 7, 2024; 7:00 p.m., ESPN+		Georgia Southern	W 78–65	11–13 (4–8)	20 – Tabe	7 – Tabe	4 – Millender	Mitchell Cetner (1,712); Mobile, AL
February 10, 2024*; 2:00 p.m., ESPN+		Northern Illinois; MAC-SBC Challenge	W 75–66	12–13	23 – Jones	6 – Tied	8 – Millender	Mitchell Center (1,539); Mobile, AL
February 15, 2024; 7:00 p.m., ESPN+		Texas State	W 72–55	13–13 (5–8)	18 – Gaiter	4 – Gaiter	6 – Millender	Mitchell Center (2,151); Mobile, AL
February 17, 2024; 3:00 p.m., ESPN+		Arkansas State	L 73–76	13–14 (5–9)	35 – Tabe	6 – Tied	6 – Millender	Mitchell Center (1,723); Mobile, AL
February 22, 2024; 7:00 p.m., ESPN+		at Southern Miss	W 83–64	14–14 (6–9)	29 – Tabe	8 – Jones	3 – Millender	Reed Green Coliseum (4,202); Hattiesburg, MS
February 24, 2024; 2:30 p.m., ESPN+		at Arkansas State	L 78–95	14–15 (6–10)	27 – Tied	7 – Tabe	4 – Jones	First National Bank Arena (4,178); Jonesboro, AR
February 28, 2024; 7:00 p.m., ESPN+		Southern Miss	W 73–70	15–15 (7–10)	18 – Margrave	7 – Howell	7 – Millender	Mitchell Center (2,253); Mobile, AL
March 1, 2024; 7:00 p.m., ESPN+		Louisiana–Monroe	W 80–69	16–15 (8–10)	21 – Jones	8 – Millender	4 – Millender	Mitchell Center (1,969); Mobile, AL
Sun Belt Conference tournament
March 7, 2024; 11:30 am, ESPN+	(8)	vs. (9) Georgia Southern; Second round	L 71–76	16–16	22 – Jones	12 – Kearing	2 – Gaiter	Pensacola Bay Center (764); Pensacola, FL
*Non-conference game. ^{#}Rankings from AP Poll. (#) Tournament seedings in parentheses. All times are in Central Time.
