= 2023–24 Georgia State Panthers men's basketball team =

American college basketball season

2023–24 Georgia State Panthers men's basketball
- Conference: Sun Belt Conference
- Record: 14–17 (8–10 Sun Belt)
- Head coach: Jonas Hayes (2nd season)
- Assistant coaches: Danny Peters (2nd season); Jarvis Hayes (5th season); Allen Payne (2nd season); Sean Flannery (1st season)
- Home arena: GSU Convocation Center

2023–24 Sun Belt Conference men's basketball standings
	Conf.				Overall
Team	W		L	PCT	W		L	PCT
Appalachian State	16	–	2	.889	27	–	7	.794
James Madison †	15	–	3	.833	32	–	4	.889
Troy	13	–	5	.722	20	–	12	.625
Arkansas State	11	–	7	.611	20	–	17	.541
Louisiana	10	–	8	.556	19	–	14	.576
Southern Miss	9	–	9	.500	16	–	16	.500
Georgia State	8	–	10	.444	14	–	17	.452
South Alabama	8	–	10	.444	16	–	16	.500
Georgia Southern	8	–	10	.444	9	–	24	.273
Marshall	7	–	11	.389	13	–	20	.394
Texas State	7	–	11	.389	17	–	18	.486
Louisiana–Monroe	6	–	12	.333	11	–	19	.367
Coastal Carolina	5	–	13	.278	9	–	22	.290
Old Dominion	3	–	15	.167	7	–	25	.219
† 2024 Sun Belt tournament winner

The 2023–24 Georgia State Panthers men's basketball team represented Georgia State University during the 2023–24 NCAA Division I men's basketball season. The Panthers, led by second-year head coach Jonas Hayes, played their home games at the GSU Convocation Center in Atlanta, Georgia as members of the Sun Belt Conference. They finished the season 14–17, 8–10 in Sun Belt play to finish in a three-way tie for seventh place. As the No. 7 seed in the Sun Belt tournament, they lost to Marshall in the second round.

== Previous season ==
The Panthers finished the 2022–23 season 10–21, 3–15 in Sun Belt play to finish in last place. The Panthers lost to Texas State in the first round of the Sun Belt Conference tournament.

== Offseason ==
=== Recruiting classes ===
==== 2023 recruiting class ====
College recruiting information
Name	Hometown	School	Height	Weight	Commit date
DK Manyiel; C	Decatur, GA	Greenforest Mccalep Christian Academy	7 ft 0 in (2.13 m)	200 lb (91 kg)	Aug 19, 2022
DK Manyiel; C	Recruit ratings: Scout: Rivals: 247Sports: ESPN: (78)				
Vashon Ferguson; SG	Grovetown, GA	Grovetown High School	6 ft 4 in (1.93 m)	190 lb (86 kg)	Jul 31, 2022
Vashon Ferguson; SG	Recruit ratings: No ratings found				
Overall recruit ranking:
Note: In many cases, Scout, Rivals, 247Sports, On3, and ESPN may conflict in their listings of height and weight.; In these cases, the average was taken. ESPN grades are on a 100-point scale.; Sources: "Georgia State 2023 Basketball Commits". ESPN.; "2023 Team Ranking". Rivals.

== Preseason ==
=== Preseason Sun Belt Conference poll ===
The Panthers were picked to finish in fifth place in the conference's preseason poll.

Coaches poll
Predicted finish	Team (1st place Votes)
1	Louisiana - 190 (10)
2	Texas State - 162 (1)
3	South Alabama - 150 (1)
4	James Madison - 149 (1)
5	Georgia State - 127 (1)
6	Marshall - 122
7	App State - 120
8	Coastal Carolina - 100
9	Old Dominion - 93
10	Troy - 76
11	Georgia Southern - 69
12	Arkansas State - 48
13	Southern Miss - 34
14	ULM - 30

== Roster ==
2023–24 Georgia State Panthers men's basketball team
Players
Coaches

Pos.	#	Name	Height	Weight	Year	Previous school	Hometown
G	0	Malik Ferguson	6 ft 4 in (1.93 m)	188 lb (85 kg)	Fr	Grovetown High School	Grovetown, Georgia
G	1	Dwon Odom	6 ft 2 in (1.88 m)	182 lb (83 kg)	Sr	Xavier	Alpharetta, Georgia
F	2	Jamaine Mann	6 ft 6 in (1.98 m)	230 lb (104 kg)	Jr	Vanderbilt	Hampton, Georgia
G	3	Julian Mackey	6 ft 2 in (1.88 m)	170 lb (77 kg)	Jr	Northeastern Oklahoma A&M College	Grayson, Georgia
G	4	Rickey Bradley Jr.	6 ft 2 in (1.88 m)	185 lb (84 kg)	So	VMI	Milwaukee, Wisconsin
G	5	Brenden Tucker	6 ft 3 in (1.91 m)	195 lb (88 kg)	Sr	Charleston	Lawrenceville, Georgia
F	10	Jay'Den Turner	6 ft 5 in (1.96 m)	205 lb (93 kg)	GS	Queens	High Point, North Carolina
G	11	Toneari Lane	6 ft 5 in (1.96 m)	205 lb (93 kg)	RS So	Winthrop	Atlanta, Georgia
F	12	Dhiaukuei "DK" Manyiel Dut	7 ft 0 in (2.13 m)	200 lb (91 kg)	Fr	Greenforest Christian Academy	Rumbek, South Sudan
G	14	Aaron Oh	6 ft 0 in (1.83 m)	185 lb (84 kg)	RS Fr	Mill Creek High School	Buford, Georgia
C	21	Edward Nnamoko	6 ft 10 in (2.08 m)	225 lb (102 kg)	So	Riviera Prep	Lagos, Nigeria
F	23	Leslie Nkereuwem	6 ft 8 in (2.03 m)	232 lb (105 kg)	GS	Longwood	Lawrenceville, Georgia
G	31	Lucas Taylor	6 ft 5 in (1.96 m)	200 lb (91 kg)	Jr	Wake Forest	Raleigh, North Carolina
G		Brevyn Coleman	6 ft 1 in (1.85 m)	185 lb (84 kg)	Fr	St. Edward High School	Lakewood, Ohio
G		Matt Davis	6 ft 7 in (2.01 m)	195 lb (88 kg)	Jr	Laramie County Community College	Alpharetta, Georgia
G		Michael Whitmore	5 ft 11 in (1.8 m)	165 lb (75 kg)	RS So	Holmes Community College	Atlanta, Georgia

Head coach

- Jonas Hayes (Georgia)

Assistant coach(es)

- Danny Peters (Ohio State)
- Jarvis Hayes (Georgia)
- Allen Payne (Auburn)
- Sean Flannery (John Carroll)

Legend

- (C) Team captain
- (S) Suspended
- (I) Ineligible
- (W) Walk-on
- Injured
- Current redshirt

Roster
Last update: December 7, 2023

== Schedule and results ==
Date time, TV	Rank^{#}	Opponent^{#}	Result	Record	High points	High rebounds	High assists	Site (attendance) city, state
Exhibition
October 29, 2023*; 2:00 pm		Morehouse	W 92–66	–	19 – Turner	12 – Turner	6 – Taylor	GSU Convocation Center (1,964); Atlanta, GA
Non-conference regular season
November 6, 2023*; 7:30 pm, ESPN+		at Belmont	L 87–89	0–1	14 – Nkereuwem	11 – Turner	6 – Odom	Curb Event Center (2,204); Nashville, TN
November 11, 2023*; 1:00 pm, ESPN+		at Western Michigan; MAC-SBC Challenge	W 77–70	1–1	27 – Taylor	7 – Turner	2 – Turner	University Arena (1,313); Kalamazoo, MI
November 17, 2023*; 2:00 pm, ESPN+		Northern Illinois; Capitol Challenge	L 64–70	1–2	16 – Tucker	12 – Turner	5 – Odom	GSU Convocation Center (1,337); Atlanta, GA
November 19, 2023*; 2:00 pm, ESPN+		Little Rock; Capitol Challenge	W 88–77	2–2	23 – Lane	7 – 2 Tied	5 – 2 Tied	GSU Convocation Center (1,451); Atlanta, GA
November 22, 2023*; 1:00 pm, ESPN+		at Little Rock	W 93–90 ^{OT}	3–2	23 – Lane	8 – Turner	3 – Odom	Jack Stephens Center (737); Little Rock, AR
November 25, 2023*; 6:00 pm, ESPN+		at Charlotte	L 57–65	3–3	12 – Lane	11 – Nkereuwem	3 – 3 Tied	Dale F. Halton Arena (2,218); Charlotte, NC
December 2, 2023*; 1:00 pm, ESPN+		at Kennesaw State	L 77–88	3–4	17 – Taylor	8 – Turner	5 – Odom	KSU Convocation Center (3,805); Kennesaw, GA
December 4, 2023*; 7:00 pm, ESPN+		Middle Georgia State	W 89–57	4–4	19 – Turner	7 – Nnamoko	9 – Odom	GSU Convocation Center (1,570); Atlanta, GA
December 9, 2023*; 2:00 pm, ESPN+		at Mercer	L 60–64	4–5	15 – Taylor	8 – Turner	4 – Odom	Hawkins Arena (1,527); Macon, GA
December 16, 2023*; 9:00 pm, ESPN+		at No. 18 BYU	L 54–86	4–6	12 – Odom	10 – Odom	3 – Tied	Marriott Center (13,819); Provo, UT
December 19, 2023*; 11:00 am, ESPN+		Toccoa Falls	W 122–45	5–6	18 – Lane	16 – Nnamoko	9 – Odom	GSU Convocation Center (2,034); Atlanta, GA
Sun Belt regular season
December 30, 2023; 2:00 pm, ESPN+		Arkansas State	W 91–90	6–6 (1–0)	24 – Odom	12 – Turner	4 – Turner	GSU Convocation Center (1,644); Atlanta, GA
January 4, 2024; 8:00 pm, ESPN+		at Southern Miss	L 73–79	6–7 (1–1)	15 – Tied	11 – Tied	3 – Taylor	Reed Green Coliseum (3,733); Hattiesburg, MS
January 6, 2024; 4:00 pm, ESPN+		at South Alabama	W 90–76	7–7 (2–1)	22 – Taylor	10 – Turner	4 – Odom	Mitchell Center (2,141); Mobile, AL
January 11, 2024; 7:00 pm, ESPN+		Old Dominion	W 77–70	8–7 (3–1)	23 – Lane	15 – Turner	8 – Odom	GSU Convocation Center (1,642); Atlanta, GA
January 13, 2024; 5:00 pm, ESPN+		Georgia Southern; Modern Day Hate	W 90–62	9–7 (4–1)	28 – Taylor	15 – Turner	9 – Odom	GSU Convocation Center (3,152); Atlanta, GA
January 17, 2024; 6:30 pm, ESPN+		at Appalachian State	L 68–76	9–8 (4–2)	12 – Tied	12 – Turner	3 – Tied	Holmes Center; Boone, NC
January 20, 2024; 3:00 pm, ESPN+		at Georgia Southern; Modern Day Hate	L 70–86	9–9 (4–3)	20 – Taylor	5 – Nkereuwem	2 – Odom	Hanner Fieldhouse (2,831); Statesboro, GA
January 24, 2024; 7:00 pm, ESPN+		at Marshall	L 68–77	9–10 (4–4)	21 – Odom	11 – Turner	5 – Odom	Cam Henderson Center (4,045); Huntington, WV
January 27, 2024; 2:00 pm, ESPN+		at Coastal Carolina	L 83–85 ^{OT}	9–11 (4–5)	30 – Odom	7 – Turner	3 – 2 Tied	HTC Center (1,389); Conway, SC
February 1, 2024; 7:00 pm, ESPN+		Appalachian State	L 71–81	9–12 (4–6)	14 – Taylor	8 – 3 Tied	3 – 4 Tied	GSU Convocation Center (3,127); Atlanta, GA
February 3, 2024; 4:00 pm, ESPN+		Troy	L 74–78	9–13 (4–7)	22 – Taylor	8 – Nkereuwem	5 – Odom	GSU Convocation Center (2,624); Atlanta, GA
February 7, 2024; 8:00 pm, ESPN+		at Louisiana	W 78–69	10–13 (5–7)	16 – Lane	8 – Turner	2 – 2 Tied	Cajundome (1,613); Lafayette, LA
February 10, 2024*; 2:00 pm, ESPN+		Miami (OH); MAC-SBC Challenge	W 73–53	11–13	17 – Lane	9 – Nnamoko	6 – Odom	GSU Convocation Center (1,643); Atlanta, GA
February 15, 2024; 8:00 pm, ESPN+		at James Madison	L 63–83	11–14 (5–8)	18 – Mackey	8 – Nkereuwem	3 – Odom	Atlantic Union Bank Center (4,162); Harrisonburg, VA
February 17, 2024; 7:00 pm, ESPN+		at Old Dominion	W 68–65	12–14 (6–8)	16 – Mackey	12 – Turner	5 – Odom	Chartway Arena (5,996); Norfolk, VA
February 21, 2024; 7:00 pm, ESPN+		Coastal Carolina	W 72–71	13–14 (7–8)	16 – Lane	8 – Turner	7 – Odom	GSU Convocation Center (1,697); Atlanta, GA
February 24, 2024; 2:00 pm, ESPN+		Texas State	L 59–68	13–15 (7–9)	16 – Odom	10 – Turner	5 – Odom	GSU Convocation Center (1,992); Atlanta, GA
February 28, 2024; 7:00 pm, ESPN+		James Madison	L 78–84	13–16 (7–10)	18 – Taylor	10 – Turner	2 – 3 Tied	GSU Convocation Center (1,988); Atlanta, GA
March 1, 2024; 7:00 pm, ESPN+		Marshall	W 82–79	14–16 (8–10)	26 – Taylor	9 – Turner	10 – Odom	GSU Convocation Center (2,122); Atlanta, GA
Sun Belt tournament
March 7, 2024; 8:30 pm, ESPN+	(7)	vs. (10) Marshall; Second round	L 74–86	14–17	20 – Taylor	7 – 2 Tied	5 – Odom	Pensacola Bay Center (1,207); Pensacola, FL
*Non-conference game. ^{#}Rankings from AP Poll. (#) Tournament seedings in parentheses. All times are in Eastern.
