= 2024 Sun Belt Conference men's basketball tournament =

U.S. collegiate basketball event

- Classification: Division I
- Season: 2023–24
- Teams: 14
- Site: Pensacola Bay Center; Pensacola, Florida
- Champions: James Madison (1st title)
- Winning coach: Mark Byington (1st title)
- MVP: Noah Freidel (James Madison)
- Attendance: 11,821 (total); 2,548 (championship)
- Television: ESPN+, ESPN

2023–24 Sun Belt Conference men's basketball standings
	Conf.				Overall
Team	W		L	PCT	W		L	PCT
Appalachian State	16	–	2	.889	27	–	7	.794
James Madison †	15	–	3	.833	32	–	4	.889
Troy	13	–	5	.722	20	–	12	.625
Arkansas State	11	–	7	.611	20	–	17	.541
Louisiana	10	–	8	.556	19	–	14	.576
Southern Miss	9	–	9	.500	16	–	16	.500
Georgia State	8	–	10	.444	14	–	17	.452
South Alabama	8	–	10	.444	16	–	16	.500
Georgia Southern	8	–	10	.444	9	–	24	.273
Marshall	7	–	11	.389	13	–	20	.394
Texas State	7	–	11	.389	17	–	18	.486
Louisiana–Monroe	6	–	12	.333	11	–	19	.367
Coastal Carolina	5	–	13	.278	9	–	22	.290
Old Dominion	3	–	15	.167	7	–	25	.219
† 2024 Sun Belt tournament winner

The 2024 Sun Belt Conference men's basketball tournament was the postseason men's basketball tournament for the Sun Belt Conference during the 2023–24 NCAA Division I men's basketball season. All tournament games were played at Pensacola Bay Center between March 5–11, 2024. The winner, James Madison, received the Sun Belt's automatic bid to the 2024 NCAA tournament.

== Seeds ==
All 14 conference teams qualified for the tournament. Teams were seeded by record within the conference, with a tiebreaker system to seed teams with identical conference records. The top 10 teams received a first round bye and the top four teams received a double bye, automatically advancing them into the quarterfinals.

Seed	School	Conference	Tiebreaker
1	Appalachian State	16–2	
2	James Madison	15–3	
3	Troy	13–5	
4	Arkansas State	11–7	
5	Louisiana	10–8	
6	Southern Miss	9–9	
7	Georgia State	8–10	2–1 against Georgia Southern/South Alabama
8	South Alabama	8–10	1–1 against Georgia State/Georgia Southern
9	Georgia Southern	8–10	1–2 against Georgia State/South Alabama
10	Marshall	7–11	1–0 against Texas State
11	Texas State	7–11	0–1 against Marshall
12	Louisiana–Monroe	6–12	
13	Coastal Carolina	5–13	
14	Old Dominion	3–15	

== Schedule ==
Game	Time	Matchup	Score	Television	Attendance
First round – Tuesday, March 5
1	5:00 pm	No. 12 Louisiana-Monroe vs. No. 13 Coastal Carolina	71–75	ESPN+	795
2	7:30 pm	No. 11 Texas State vs. No. 14 Old Dominion	92–83^{OT}	ESPN+	795
Second round – Thursday, March 7
3	11:30 am	No. 8 South Alabama vs. No. 9 Georgia Southern	71–76	ESPN+	882
4	2:00 pm	No. 5 Louisiana vs. No. 13 Coastal Carolina	80–66	ESPN+	882
5	5:00 pm	No. 6 Southern Miss vs. No. 11 Texas State	59–75	ESPN+	1,207
6	7:30 pm	No. 7 Georgia State vs. No. 10 Marshall	74–86	ESPN+	1,207
Quarterfinals – Saturday, March 9
7	11:30 am	No. 1 Appalachian State vs. No. 9 Georgia Southern	85–80 ^{OT}	ESPN+	2,059
8	2:00 pm	No. 4 Arkansas State vs. No. 5 Louisiana	89–62	ESPN+	2,059
9	5:00 pm	No. 3 Troy vs. No. 11 Texas State	68–74	ESPN+	2,501
10	7:30 pm	No. 2 James Madison vs. No. 10 Marshall	81–64	ESPN+	2,501
Semifinals – Sunday, March 10
11	5:00 pm	No. 1 Appalachian State vs. No. 4 Arkansas State	65–67	ESPN+	1,829
12	7:30 pm	No. 11 Texas State vs. No. 2 James Madison	68–73	ESPN+	1,829
Championship – Monday, March 11
13	6:00 pm	No. 4 Arkansas State vs. No. 2 James Madison	71–91	ESPN	2,548
Game times in CT. Rankings denote tournament seed

== Bracket ==
First round Tuesday, March 5 ESPN+
12	Louisiana–Monroe	71
13	Coastal Carolina	75
11	Texas State	92*
14	Old Dominion	83

Second round Thursday, March 7 ESPN+
8	South Alabama	71
9	Georgia Southern	76
5	Louisiana	80
13	Coastal Carolina	66
7	Georgia State	74
10	Marshall	86
6	Southern Miss	59
11	Texas State	75

Quarterfinals; Saturday, March 9 ESPN+
1	Appalachian State	85*
9	Georgia Southern	80
4	Arkansas State	89
5	Louisiana	62
2	James Madison	81
10	Marshall	64
3	Troy	68
11	Texas State	74

Semifinals; Sunday, March 10; ESPN+
1	Appalachian State	65
4	Arkansas State	67
2	James Madison	73
11	Texas State	68

Championship; Monday, March 11; ESPN
4	Arkansas State	71
2	James Madison	91

* – Denotes overtime period

== See also ==
2024 Sun Belt Conference women's basketball tournament
