= 2023–24 Louisiana–Monroe Warhawks men's basketball team =

American college basketball season

2023–24 Louisiana–Monroe Warhawks men's basketball
- Conference: Sun Belt Conference
- Record: 11–19 (6–12 Sun Belt)
- Head coach: Keith Richard (14th season)
- Assistant coaches: Morris Scott; Christopher Woodall; Ronnie Dean
- Home arena: Fant–Ewing Coliseum

2023–24 Sun Belt Conference men's basketball standings
	Conf.				Overall
Team	W		L	PCT	W		L	PCT
Appalachian State	16	–	2	.889	27	–	7	.794
James Madison †	15	–	3	.833	32	–	4	.889
Troy	13	–	5	.722	20	–	12	.625
Arkansas State	11	–	7	.611	20	–	17	.541
Louisiana	10	–	8	.556	19	–	14	.576
Southern Miss	9	–	9	.500	16	–	16	.500
Georgia State	8	–	10	.444	14	–	17	.452
South Alabama	8	–	10	.444	16	–	16	.500
Georgia Southern	8	–	10	.444	9	–	24	.273
Marshall	7	–	11	.389	13	–	20	.394
Texas State	7	–	11	.389	17	–	18	.486
Louisiana–Monroe	6	–	12	.333	11	–	19	.367
Coastal Carolina	5	–	13	.278	9	–	22	.290
Old Dominion	3	–	15	.167	7	–	25	.219
† 2024 Sun Belt tournament winner

The 2023–24 Louisiana–Monroe Warhawks men's basketball team represented the University of Louisiana at Monroe during the 2023–24 NCAA Division I men's basketball season. The Warhawks, led by 14th-year head coach Keith Richard, played their home games at Fant–Ewing Coliseum in Monroe, Louisiana as members of the Sun Belt Conference. They finished the season 11–19, 6–12 in Sun Belt play to finish in twelfth place. As the No. 12 seed in the Sun Belt Tournament, they lost to Coastal Carolina in the first round.

== Previous season ==
The Warhawks finished the 2022–23 season 11–21, 7–11 in Sun Belt play to finish in tenth place. The Warhawks would lose to Georgia Southern in the first round of the Sun Belt Conference tournament.

== Offseason ==
=== Recruiting classes ===
==== 2023 recruiting class ====
College recruiting information
Name	Hometown	School	Height	Weight	Commit date
Kelton Williams; PG	Midloathian, TX	Midloathian High School	6 ft 1 in (1.85 m)	165 lb (75 kg)	Oct 7, 2022
Kelton Williams; PG	Recruit ratings: No ratings found				
Overall recruit ranking:
Note: In many cases, Scout, Rivals, 247Sports, On3, and ESPN may conflict in their listings of height and weight.; In these cases, the average was taken. ESPN grades are on a 100-point scale.; Sources: "Louisiana–Monroe 2023-24 Basketball Commits". ESPN.; "2023-24 Team Ranking". Rivals.

== Preseason ==
=== Preseason Sun Belt Conference poll ===
The Warhawks were picked to finish in 14th place in the conference's preseason poll.

Coaches poll
Predicted finish	Team (1st place Votes)
1	James Madison - 176 (7)
2	App State - 159 (2)
3	Old Dominion - 154 (1)
4	Southern Miss - 148
5	Louisiana - 136 (2)
6	South Alabama - 129 (2)
7	Marshall - 119
8	Troy - 91
9	Arkansas State - 84
10	Texas State - 72
11	Georgia State - 69
12	Coastal Carolina - 59
13	Georgia Southern - 42
14	ULM - 32

== Roster ==
2023–24 Louisiana–Monroe Warhawks men's basketball team
Players
Coaches

Pos.	#	Name	Height	Weight	Year	Previous school	Hometown
G	0	Jacob Wilson	6 ft 6 in (1.98 m)	202 lb (92 kg)	So	Liberty Magnet High School	Baton Rouge, Louisiana
G	1	Savion Gallion	6 ft 4 in (1.93 m)	192 lb (87 kg)	Sr	South Plains College	Washington, D.C.
G	2	Devon Hancock	6 ft 3 in (1.91 m)	198 lb (90 kg)	Jr	Milwaukee	Dallas, Texas
G	3	Tyreke Locure	6 ft 0 in (1.83 m)	167 lb (76 kg)	Sr	UAB	New Orleans, Louisiana
F	4	Nika Metskhvarishvili	6 ft 8 in (2.03 m)	240 lb (109 kg)	Sr	Ranger College	Tbilisi, Georgia
G	5	Jalen Bolden	6 ft 4 in (1.93 m)	212 lb (96 kg)	So	Zachary High School	Zachary, Louisiana
G	10	Tyreese Watson	6 ft 4 in (1.93 m)	190 lb (86 kg)	Jr	Cochise College	Philadelphia, Pennsylvania
G	11	Kelton Williams	6 ft 1 in (1.85 m)	165 lb (75 kg)	Fr	Midlothian High School	Midlothian, Texas
F	13	Makai Willis	6 ft 9 in (2.06 m)	232 lb (105 kg)	Jr	Fairfield	Tallahassee, Florida
F	14	Jerry Ngopot	6 ft 11 in (2.11 m)	236 lb (107 kg)	So	Saint Peter's	Bangui, Central African Republic
G	15	P.D. McCraney	6 ft 1 in (1.85 m)	160 lb (73 kg)	So	Hinds Community College	Monroe, Louisiana
G	21	Ajay Tew	5 ft 10 in (1.78 m)	160 lb (73 kg)	Fr	Jonesboro-Hodge High School	Jonesboro, Louisiana
F	22	Edwin Litolff	6 ft 7 in (2.01 m)	189 lb (86 kg)	So	Doyle High School	Livingston, Louisiana
G	23	Johnnie Williams IV	6 ft 5 in (1.96 m)	180 lb (82 kg)	Jr	Putnam Science Academy	Sarasota, Florida
F	34	AD Diedhiou	6 ft 11 in (2.11 m)	250 lb (113 kg)	Jr	UAB	Dakar, Senegal

Head coach

- Keith Richard (Louisiana–Monroe)

Assistant coach(es)

- Morris Scott (Florida A&M)
- Christopher Woodall (William Carey)
- Ronnie Dean (Harris–Stowe State)

Legend

- (C) Team captain
- (S) Suspended
- (I) Ineligible
- (W) Walk-on
- Injured
- Current redshirt

Roster
Last update: December 7, 2023

== Schedule and results ==
Date time, TV	Rank^{#}	Opponent^{#}	Result	Record	High points	High rebounds	High assists	Site (attendance) city, state
Non-conference regular season
November 6, 2023*; 7:00 pm, ESPN+		at No. 7 Houston	L 31–84	0–1	8 – Gallion	4 – 3 Tied	2 – Locure	Fertitta Center (6,832); Houston, TX
November 11, 2023*; 11:00 am, ESPN+		at Central Michigan; MAC-SBC Challenge	W 74–64	1–1	16 – Metskhvarishvili	6 – 2 Tied	6 – Locure	McGuirk Arena (1,160); Mount Pleasant, MI
November 16, 2023*; 6:30 pm, ESPN+		Louisiana Tech	L 63–73	1–2	15 – 2 Tied	7 – Bolden	4 – Locure	Fant–Ewing Coliseum (1,702); Monroe, LA
November 20, 2023*; 6:30 pm, ESPN+		Ecclesia	W 103–74	2–2	15 – Bolden	10 – Willis	5 – Metskhvarishvili	Fant–Ewing Coliseum (256); Monroe, LA
November 26, 2023*; 2:00 pm, ESPN+		at SMU	L 57–70	2–3	14 – Watson	8 – Diedhiou	4 – Hancock	Moody Coliseum (4,557); University Park, TX
November 28, 2023*; 6:30 pm, ESPN+		Northwestern State	W 74–70	3–3	19 – Metskhvarishvili	14 – Bolden	2 – 3 Tied	Fant–Ewing Coliseum (909); Monroe, LA
December 5, 2023*; 6:30 pm, ESPN+		Champion Christian	W 110–63	4–3	16 – Wilson	10 – Ngopot	7 – Wilson	Fant–Ewing Coliseum (342); Monroe, LA
December 12, 2023*; 6:30 pm, ESPN+		at Sam Houston	L 62–63	4–4	14 – Bolden	12 – Bolden	4 – Diedhiou	Bernard Johnson Coliseum (599); Huntsville, TX
December 14, 2023*; 7:00 pm, ESPN+		at Lamar	L 73–97	4–5	17 – Gallion	11 – Metskhvarishvili	4 – 2 Tied	Neches Arena (1,014); Beaumont, TX
December 18, 2023*; 10:30 am, ESPN+		at Jacksonville	L 65–75	4–6	17 – Metskhvarishvili	11 – Metskhvarishvili	6 – Locure	Swisher Gymnasium (400); Jacksonville, FL
Sun Belt regular season
December 30, 2023; 3:00 pm, ESPN+		at Appalachian State	L 55–67	4–7 (0–1)	16 – Metskhvarishvili	9 – Metskhvarishvili	4 – Watson	Holmes Center (2,065); Boone, NC
January 3, 2024; 6:30 pm, ESPN+		Marshall	L 57–68	4–8 (0–2)	12 – Ngopot	9 – Metskhvarishvili	4 – Gallion	Fant–Ewing Coliseum (919); Monroe, LA
January 6, 2024; 2:00 pm, ESPN+		Georgia Southern	L 68–76	4–9 (0–3)	24 – Locure	8 – 2 Tied	4 – Bolden	Fant–Ewing Coliseum (1,007); Monroe, LA
January 11, 2024; 7:30 pm, ESPN+		Southern Miss	L 58–71	4–10 (0–4)	14 – Metskhvarishvili	10 – Bolden	4 – Metskhvarishvili	Fant–Ewing Coliseum (1,249); Monroe, LA
January 13, 2024; 2:30 pm, ESPN+		Texas State	L 54–67	4–11 (0–5)	11 – Willis	7 – 2 Tied	3 – Locure	Fant–Ewing Coliseum (1,305); Monroe, LA
January 18, 2024; 7:00 pm, ESPN+		at James Madison	L 70–89	4–12 (0–6)	16 – Gallion	8 – Ngopot	4 – Locure	Atlantic Union Bank Center (4,033); Harrisonburg, VA
January 20, 2024; 6:00 pm, ESPN+		at Old Dominion	W 80–73	5–12 (1–6)	20 – Locure	13 – Bolden	3 – Gallion	Chartway Arena (6.088); Norfolk, VA
January 25, 2024; 7:30 pm, ESPN+		South Alabama	W 80–66	6–12 (2–6)	21 – Willis	11 – Bolden	4 – Locure	Fant–Ewing Coliseum (1,600); Monroe, LA
January 28, 2024; 1:00 pm, ESPN+		Arkansas State	W 85–82 ^{OT}	7–12 (3–6)	24 – Metskhvarishvili	11 – Metskhvarishvili	3 – Locure	Fant–Ewing Coliseum (1,376); Monroe, LA
January 31, 2024; 7:00 pm, ESPN+		at Louisiana	L 72–80	7–13 (3–7)	21 – Watson	7 – Bolden	3 – Gallion	Cajundome (1,668); Lafayette, LA
February 3, 2024; 2:30 pm, ESPN+		at Arkansas State	L 80–95	7–14 (3–8)	20 – Metskhvarishvili	4 – 3 Tied	3 – Locure	First National Bank Arena (2,743); Jonesboro, AR
February 7, 2024; 6:30 pm, ESPN+		Coastal Carolina	W 79–75	8–14 (4–8)	28 – Metskhvarishvili	8 – Locure	4 – Watson	Fant–Ewing Coliseum (1,392); Monroe, LA
February 10, 2024*; 2:00 pm, ESPN+		Eastern Michigan; MAC-SBC Challenge	W 82–76	9–14	25 – Locure	10 – Locure	6 – Locure	Fant–Ewing Coliseum (1,102); Monroe, LA
February 15, 2024; 7:30 pm, ESPN+		at Southern Miss	W 68–59	10–14 (5–8)	20 – Locure	7 – Metskhvarishvili	5 – 2 Tied	Reed Green Coliseum (4,247); Hattiesburg, MS
February 17, 2024; 4:00 pm, ESPN+		at Troy	L 57–85	10–15 (5–9)	10 – Willis	6 – Bolden	5 – Locure	Trojan Arena (4,321); Troy, AL
February 22, 2024; 7:30 pm, ESPN+		Louisiana	W 66–59	11–15 (6–9)	17 – Metskhvarishvili	13 – Bolden	5 – Locure	Fant–Ewing Coliseum (1,467); Monroe, LA
February 24, 2024; 2:30 pm, ESPN+		Troy	L 78–84	11–16 (6–10)	20 – Locure	7 – Metskhvarishvili	3 – 2 Tied	Fant–Ewing Coliseum (1,529); Monroe, LA
February 27, 2024; 7:00 pm, ESPN+		at Texas State	L 55–73	11–17 (6–11)	13 – Locure	5 – Watson	1 – 3 Tied	Strahan Arena (1,219); San Marcos, TX
March 1, 2024; 7:00 pm, ESPN+		at South Alabama	L 69–80	11–18 (6–12)	18 – Metskhvarishvili	8 – Ngopot	6 – Locure	Mitchell Center (1,969); Mobile, AL
Sun Belt tournament
March 5, 2024; 5:00 pm, ESPN+	(12)	vs. (13) Coastal Carolina; First round	L 71–75	11–19	22 – Watson	7 – Ngopot	4 – Locure	Pensacola Bay Center (651); Pensacola, FL
*Non-conference game. ^{#}Rankings from AP Poll. (#) Tournament seedings in parentheses. All times are in Central.
