= 2023–24 Georgia Southern Eagles men's basketball team =

College basketball team season

2023–24 Georgia Southern Eagles men's basketball
- Conference: Sun Belt Conference
- Record: 9–24 (8–10 Sun Belt)
- Head coach: Charlie Henry (1st season)
- Associate head coach: Chris Shumate
- Assistant coaches: Kente' Hart; Marreese Speights
- Home arena: Hanner Fieldhouse

2023–24 Sun Belt Conference men's basketball standings
	Conf.				Overall
Team	W		L	PCT	W		L	PCT
Appalachian State	16	–	2	.889	27	–	7	.794
James Madison †	15	–	3	.833	32	–	4	.889
Troy	13	–	5	.722	20	–	12	.625
Arkansas State	11	–	7	.611	20	–	17	.541
Louisiana	10	–	8	.556	19	–	14	.576
Southern Miss	9	–	9	.500	16	–	16	.500
Georgia State	8	–	10	.444	14	–	17	.452
South Alabama	8	–	10	.444	16	–	16	.500
Georgia Southern	8	–	10	.444	9	–	24	.273
Marshall	7	–	11	.389	13	–	20	.394
Texas State	7	–	11	.389	17	–	18	.486
Louisiana–Monroe	6	–	12	.333	11	–	19	.367
Coastal Carolina	5	–	13	.278	9	–	22	.290
Old Dominion	3	–	15	.167	7	–	25	.219
† 2024 Sun Belt tournament winner

The 2023–24 Georgia Southern Eagles men's basketball team represented Georgia Southern University in the 2023–24 NCAA Division I men's basketball season. The Eagles, led by first-year head coach Charlie Henry, played their home games at Hanner Fieldhouse in Statesboro, Georgia as members of the Sun Belt Conference. They finished the season 9–24, 8–10 in Sun Belt play to finish in a three-way tie for seventh place. As the No. 9 seed in the Sun Belt tournament, they defeated South Alabama in the second round, before losing to Appalachian State in the quarterfinals.

== Previous season ==
The Eagles finished the 2022–23 season 17–16, 9–9 in Sun Belt play to finish in a three-way tie for seventh place. As the #7 seed in the Sun Belt tournament, they defeated Louisiana–Monroe in the second round, before losing to Louisiana in the quarterfinals.

On March 9, 2023, the school fired head coach Brian Burg. On March 29, the school named Alabama assistant coach Charlie Henry the team's new head coach.

== Offseason ==
=== Recruiting classes ===
==== 2023 recruiting class ====
College recruiting information
Name	Hometown	School	Height	Weight	Commit date
Eren Banks; CG	Eatonton, GA	Putnam County High School	6 ft 3 in (1.91 m)	180 lb (82 kg)	May 7, 2022
Eren Banks; CG	Recruit ratings: No ratings found				
Collin Kuhl; PF	Holly Springs, NC	Holly Springs High School	6 ft 8 in (2.03 m)	195 lb (88 kg)	Aug 28, 2022
Collin Kuhl; PF	Recruit ratings: No ratings found				
Avantae Parker; PF	Columbia, SC	Gray Academy	6 ft 8 in (2.03 m)	200 lb (91 kg)	Sep 7, 2022
Avantae Parker; PF	Recruit ratings: No ratings found				
Luke Wilson; C	Augusta, GA	Augusta Christian School	6 ft 9 in (2.06 m)	280 lb (130 kg)	Nov 12, 2022
Luke Wilson; C	Recruit ratings: No ratings found				
Overall recruit ranking:
Note: In many cases, Scout, Rivals, 247Sports, On3, and ESPN may conflict in their listings of height and weight.; In these cases, the average was taken. ESPN grades are on a 100-point scale.; Sources: "Georgia Southern 2023-24 Basketball Commits". ESPN.; "2023-24 Team Ranking". Rivals.

== Preseason ==
=== Preseason Sun Belt Conference poll ===
The Eagles were picked to finish in thirteenth place in the conference's preseason poll.

Coaches poll
Predicted finish	Team (1st place Votes)
1	James Madison - 176 (7)
2	App State - 159 (2)
3	Old Dominion - 154 (1)
4	Southern Miss - 148
5	Louisiana - 136 (2)
6	South Alabama - 129 (2)
7	Marshall - 119
8	Troy - 91
9	Arkansas State - 84
10	Texas State - 72
11	Georgia State - 69
12	Coastal Carolina - 59
13	Georgia Southern - 42
14	ULM - 32

== Roster ==
2023–24 Georgia Southern Eagles men's basketball team
Players
Coaches

Pos.	#	Name	Height	Weight	Year	Previous school	Hometown
G	0	Malik Tidwell	5 ft 11 in (1.8 m)	200 lb (91 kg)	RS Sr	Bluefield State	Chicago, Illinois
F	1	Cam Bryant	6 ft 7 in (2.01 m)	205 lb (93 kg)	Sr	Dutchtown High School	Camilla, Georgia
G	2	Deuce Dean	6 ft 4 in (1.93 m)	190 lb (86 kg)	GS	Hampton	Columbia, South Carolina
F	3	Eugene Brown III	6 ft 8 in (2.03 m)	200 lb (91 kg)	GS	Ohio State	Conyers, Georgia
F/C	4	David Jones	6 ft 8 in (2.03 m)	195 lb (88 kg)	Jr	Indian Hills Community College	Sacramento, California
G	5	Derrick Harris Jr.	6 ft 3 in (1.91 m)	180 lb (82 kg)	RS So	Mitchell County High School	Camilla, Georgia
C	10	Carlos Curry	6 ft 11 in (2.11 m)	240 lb (109 kg)	GS	Northwest Mississippi Community College	Albany, Georgia
G	11	Jamar Franklin	6 ft 3 in (1.91 m)	170 lb (77 kg)	So	South Alabama	Rockledge, Florida
G	12	Tyren Moore	5 ft 11 in (1.8 m)	185 lb (84 kg)	Sr	Moberly Area Community College	Louisville, Kentucky
G	13	Eren Banks	6 ft 4 in (1.93 m)	175 lb (79 kg)	Fr	Putnam County High School	Eatonton, Georgia
F	14	Collin Kuhl	6 ft 7 in (2.01 m)	205 lb (93 kg)	Fr	Holly Springs High School	Holly Springs, North Carolina
G	21	Pierce Shirk	6 ft 4 in (1.93 m)	200 lb (91 kg)	Fr	The Bolles School	Jacksonville, Florida
F	23	Nate Brafford	6 ft 9 in (2.06 m)	200 lb (91 kg)	So	Rabun Gap-Nacoochee School	Waynesville, North Carolina
F	24	Luke Keller (W)	6 ft 7 in (2.01 m)	225 lb (102 kg)	Jr	North Gwinnett High School	Suwanee, Georgia
F	25	Avantae Parker	6 ft 9 in (2.06 m)	212 lb (96 kg)	Fr	Gray Academy	Columbia, South Carolina
F	35	Tyler Bush	6 ft 5 in (1.96 m)	198 lb (90 kg)	Jr	Centre College	Union, Kentucky

Head coach

- Charlie Henry (Madonna)

Assistant coach(es)

- Chris Shumate (Murray State)
- Kente' Hart (Purdue)
- Marreese Speights (Florida)

Legend

- (C) Team captain
- (S) Suspended
- (I) Ineligible
- (W) Walk-on
- Injured
- Current redshirt

Roster
Last update: December 9, 2023

== Schedule and results ==
Date time, TV	Rank^{#}	Opponent^{#}	Result	Record	High points	High rebounds	High assists	Site (attendance) city, state
Exhibition
October 20, 2023*; 7:00 pm		Augusta	L 77–82	–	28 – Parker	11 – Parker	8 – Dean	Hanner Fieldhouse; Statesboro, GA
Non-conference regular season
November 6, 2023*; 7:30 pm, ACCNX/ESPN+		at Georgia Tech	L 62–84	0–1	17 – Franklin	5 – 2 Tied	4 – Tidwell	McCamish Pavilion (3,414); Atlanta, GA
November 11, 2023*; 12:00 pm, ESPN+		at Eastern Michigan; MAC/SBC Challenge	L 60–70	0–2	20 – Dean	9 – Bryant	4 – Moore	George Gervin GameAbove Center (1,484); Ypsilanti, MI
November 14, 2023*; 7:00 pm, ESPN+		at Jacksonville	L 68–85	0–3	14 – Dean	5 – Brafford	4 – Dean	Swisher Gymnasium (782); Jacksonville, FL
November 19, 2023*; 5:00 pm, ESPN+		vs. Kennesaw State; TowneBank Holiday Classic	L 92–96	0–4	17 – 2 Tied	12 – Parker	4 – Moore	Williams Arena (3,673); Greenville, NC
November 20, 2023*; 6:00 pm, ESPN+		at East Carolina; TowneBank Holiday Classic	L 64–82	0–5	17 – Harris Jr.	3 – 3 Tied	3 – Brafford	Williams Arena (3,536); Greenville, NC
November 21, 2023*; 3:00 pm, ESPN+		vs. Northeastern; TowneBank Holiday Classic	L 76–93	0–6	13 – 2 Tied	8 – Parker	3 – 2 Tied	Williams Arena (129); Greenville, NC
November 28, 2023*; 6:30 pm, B1G		at Michigan State	L 55–86	0–7	15 – Moore	6 – Parker	2 – 2 Tied	Breslin Center (14,797); East Lansing, MI
December 2, 2023*; 3:00 pm, ESPN+		Jacksonville	L 79–81	0–8	30 – Moore	5 – 2 Tied	4 – Dean	Hanner Fieldhouse (2,036); Statesboro, GA
December 9, 2023*; 2:00 pm, ESPN+		at North Florida	L 56–64	0–9	10 – 4 Tied	9 – Bryant	5 – Dean	UNF Arena (1,138); Jacksonville, FL
December 12, 2023*; 7:00 pm, SECN		at No. 12 Tennessee	L 56–74	0–10	13 – Harris Jr.	9 – Brafford	3 – 2 Tied	Thompson–Boling Arena (16,013); Knoxville, TN
December 16, 2023*; 3:00 pm, ESPN+		UNC Wilmington	L 77–82	0–11	30 – Moore	4 – 2 Tied	2 – 2 Tied	Hanner Fieldhouse (1,127); Statesboro, GA
December 19, 2023*; 6:00 pm		vs. Florida Gulf Coast; Coastal Empire Eagle Classic	L 42–53	0–12	16 – Banks	4 – 3 Tied	4 – Moore	Enmarket Arena (706); Savannah, GA
Sun Belt regular season
December 30, 2023; 3:00 pm, ESPN+		Southern Miss	W 88–67	1–12 (1–0)	27 – Moore	6 – 2 Tied	5 – Moore	Hanner Fieldhouse (1,208); Statesboro, GA
January 4, 2024; 7:00 pm, ESPN+		at Arkansas State	L 83–109	1–13 (1–1)	15 – Banks	6 – Parker	2 – Parker	First National Bank Arena (1,652); Jonesboro, AR
January 6, 2024; 2:00 pm, ESPN+		at Louisiana–Monroe	W 76–68	2–13 (2–1)	20 – Brown III	8 – Bryant	7 – Moore	Fant–Ewing Coliseum (1,007); Monroe, LA
January 10, 2024; 7:00 pm, ESPN+		at Marshall	L 74–79	2–14 (2–2)	34 – Moore	9 – Parker	2 – 3 Tied	Cam Henderson Center (4,262); Huntington, WV
January 13, 2024; 5:00 pm, ESPN+		at Georgia State; Modern Day Hate	L 62–90	2–15 (2–3)	19 – Moore	6 – Jones	3 – Moore	GSU Convocation Center (3,152); Atlanta, GA
January 18, 2024; 7:00 pm, ESPN+		Coastal Carolina	W 73–70	3–15 (3–3)	19 – Banks	7 – Moore	5 – Moore	Hanner Fieldhouse (1,821); Statesboro, GA
January 20, 2024; 3:00 pm, ESPN+		Georgia State; Modern Day Hate	W 86–70	4–15 (4–3)	19 – Bryant	9 – Parker	8 – Moore	Hanner Fieldhouse (2,831); Statesboro, GA
January 25, 2024; 6:30 pm, ESPN+		at Appalachian State	L 74–84	4–16 (4–4)	28 – Moore	7 – Brown III	2 – 2 Tied	Holmes Center (3,136); Boone, NC
January 27, 2024; 7:00 pm, ESPN+		at Old Dominion	W 76–70	5–16 (5–4)	21 – Moore	9 – Bryant	4 – Banks	Chartway Arena (5,519); Norfolk, VA
February 1, 2024; 7:00 pm, ESPN+		Troy	L 63–84	5–17 (5–5)	16 – Banks	5 – 2 Tied	3 – 2 Tied	Hanner Fieldhouse (1,627); Statesboro, GA
February 3, 2024; 3:00 pm, ESPN+		Appalachian State	L 84–85 ^{OT}	5–18 (5–6)	24 – Moore	9 – Parker	4 – Moore	Hanner Fieldhouse (2,412); Statesboro, GA
February 7, 2024; 7:00 pm, ESPN+		at South Alabama	L 65–78	5–19 (5–7)	15 – Harris Jr.	4 – Brafford	2 – Banks	Mitchell Center (1,712); Mobile, AL
February 10, 2024*; 3:00 pm, ESPN+		Buffalo; MAC/SBC Challenge	L 81–82 ^{OT}	5–20	25 – Banks	9 – Parker	3 – Banks	Hanner Fieldhouse (1,524); Statesboro, GA
February 15, 2024; 7:00 pm, ESPN+		at Coastal Carolina	L 75–82	5–21 (5–8)	21 – Banks	8 – Kuhl	4 – 2 Tied	HTC Center (1,428); Conway, SC
February 17, 2024; 6:00 pm, ESPN+		at James Madison	L 80–87	5–22 (5–9)	21 – Brown III	10 – Brown III	3 – 2 Tied	Atlantic Union Bank Center (6,796); Harrisonburg, VA
February 22, 2024; 8:00 pm, ESPN+		Texas State	W 84–76	6–22 (6–9)	21 – Moore	10 – Parker	5 – Moore	Hanner Fieldhouse (1,623); Statesboro, GA
February 24, 2024; 5:00 pm, ESPN+		James Madison	L 74–80	6–23 (6–10)	27 – Moore	5 – Brown III	3 – Banks	Hanner Fieldhouse (2,342); Statesboro, GA
February 28, 2024; 7:00 pm, ESPN+		Marshall	W 87–73	7–23 (7–10)	23 – Moore	8 – Kuhl	3 – Moore	Hanner Fieldhouse (1,384); Statesboro, GA
March 1, 2024; 7:00 pm, ESPN+		Old Dominion	W 92–75	8–23 (8–10)	32 – Moore	8 – Parker	5 – Moore	Hanner Fieldhouse (1,721); Statesboro, GA
Sun Belt tournament
March 7, 2024; 11:30 am, ESPN+	(9)	vs. (8) South Alabama; Second round	W 76–71	9–23	18 – Moore	12 – Parker	3 – 2 Tied	Pensacola Bay Center (764); Pensacola, FL
March 9, 2024; 11:30 am, ESPN+	(9)	vs. (1) Appalachian State; Quarterfinals	L 80–85 ^{OT}	9–24	36 – Moore	7 – 2 Tied	5 – Moore	Pensacola Bay Center (1,763); Pensacola, FL
*Non-conference game. ^{#}Rankings from AP Poll. (#) Tournament seedings in parentheses. All times are in Central.
