= 2023–24 Troy Trojans men's basketball team =

American college basketball season

2023–24 Troy Trojans men's basketball
- Conference: Sun Belt Conference
- Record: 20–12 (13–5 Sun Belt)
- Head coach: Scott Cross (5th season)
- Associate head coach: Greg Young
- Assistant coaches: Brandon Gilbert; Mike Worley; Larry Cordaro; Kelvin Lewis
- Home arena: Trojan Arena (Capacity 6,000)

2023–24 Sun Belt Conference men's basketball standings
| | Conf. | | | | Overall |
| Team | W | | L | PCT | W | | L | PCT |
|---|---|---|---|---|---|---|---|---|
| Appalachian State | 16 | – | 2 | .889 | 27 | – | 7 | .794 |
| James Madison † | 15 | – | 3 | .833 | 32 | – | 4 | .889 |
| Troy | 13 | – | 5 | .722 | 20 | – | 12 | .625 |
| Arkansas State | 11 | – | 7 | .611 | 20 | – | 17 | .541 |
| Louisiana | 10 | – | 8 | .556 | 19 | – | 14 | .576 |
| Southern Miss | 9 | – | 9 | .500 | 16 | – | 16 | .500 |
| Georgia State | 8 | – | 10 | .444 | 14 | – | 17 | .452 |
| South Alabama | 8 | – | 10 | .444 | 16 | – | 16 | .500 |
| Georgia Southern | 8 | – | 10 | .444 | 9 | – | 24 | .273 |
| Marshall | 7 | – | 11 | .389 | 13 | – | 20 | .394 |
| Texas State | 7 | – | 11 | .389 | 17 | – | 18 | .486 |
| Louisiana–Monroe | 6 | – | 12 | .333 | 11 | – | 19 | .367 |
| Coastal Carolina | 5 | – | 13 | .278 | 9 | – | 22 | .290 |
| Old Dominion | 3 | – | 15 | .167 | 7 | – | 25 | .219 |
† 2024 Sun Belt tournament winner

The 2023–24 Troy Trojans men's basketball team represented Troy University in the 2023–24 NCAA Division I men's basketball season. The Trojans, led by fifth-year head coach Scott Cross, played their home games at Trojan Arena in Troy, Alabama as members of the Sun Belt Conference. They finished the season 20–12, 13–5 in Sun Belt play, to finish in third place. As the No. 3 seed in the Sun Belt tournament, they lost to Texas State in the quarterfinals.

== Previous season ==
The Trojans finished the 2022–23 season 20–13, 11–7 in Sun Belt play, to finish in a tie for fifth place. The Trojans beat Arkansas State in the second round before losing to James Madison in the quarterfinals of the Sun Belt Conference tournament.

== Offseason ==
=== Recruiting classes ===
==== 2023 recruiting class ====
College recruiting information
| Name | Hometown | School | Height | Weight | Commit date |
|---|---|---|---|---|---|
| Myles Rigsby; CG | Fort Worth, TX | O. D. Wyatt High School | 6 ft 5 in (1.96 m) | 180 lb (82 kg) | Sep 13, 2022 |
| Myles Rigsby; CG | Recruit ratings: No ratings found | | | | |
Overall recruit ranking:
Note: In many cases, Scout, Rivals, 247Sports, On3, and ESPN may conflict in their listings of height and weight.; In these cases, the average was taken. ESPN grades are on a 100-point scale.; Sources: "2023 Team Ranking". Rivals.

== Preseason ==
=== Preseason Sun Belt Conference poll ===
The Trojans were picked to finish in eighth place in the conference's preseason poll. Senior guard Christyon Eugene was named to the preseason All-SBC First Team. Senior guard Aamer Muhammed was named to the conference preseason third team.

Coaches poll
| Predicted finish | Team (1st-place votes) |
| 1 | James Madison – 176 (7) |
| 2 | App State – 159 (2) |
| 3 | Old Dominion – 154 (1) |
| 4 | Southern Miss – 148 |
| 5 | Louisiana – 136 (2) |
| 6 | South Alabama – 129 (2) |
| 7 | Marshall – 119 |
| 8 | Troy – 91 |
| 9 | Arkansas State – 84 |
| 10 | Texas State – 72 |
| 11 | Georgia State – 69 |
| 12 | Coastal Carolina – 59 |
| 13 | Georgia Southern – 42 |
| 14 | ULM – 32 |

== Roster ==
2023–24 Troy Trojans men's basketball team
Players
Coaches

| Pos. | # | Name | Height | Weight | Year | Previous school | Hometown |
|---|---|---|---|---|---|---|---|
| G/F | 0 | Kerrington Kiel | 6 ft 6 in (1.98 m) | 185 lb (84 kg) | Fr | Ramsay High School | Birmingham, AL |
| F | 1 | Thomas Dowd | 6 ft 8 in (2.03 m) | 225 lb (102 kg) | Fr | Dothan High School | Dothan, AL |
| G | 2 | Marcus Jr. Rigsby | 6 ft 3 in (1.91 m) | 203 lb (92 kg) | So | Tyler Junior College | Fort Worth, TX |
| G | 3 | Marcus Friend | 6 ft 0 in (1.83 m) | 193 lb (88 kg) | Sr | Salem | Albany, NY |
| F | 4 | Myles Rigsby | 6 ft 6 in (1.98 m) | 190 lb (86 kg) | Fr | O. D. Wyatt High School | Fort Worth, TX |
| G | 5 | Christyon Eugene | 6 ft 3 in (1.91 m) | 210 lb (95 kg) | Sr | Eastern Florida State College | Spring, TX |
| F | 10 | Jerrell Bellamy | 6 ft 9 in (2.06 m) | 210 lb (95 kg) | Jr | Chattahoochee Valley Community College | Phenix City, AL |
| F | 11 | Victor Valdes | 6 ft 7 in (2.01 m) | 258 lb (117 kg) | Fr | Zentro Basket Madrid | Monterrey, Spain |
| G | 12 | Tayton Conerway | 6 ft 3 in (1.91 m) | 186 lb (84 kg) | Jr | Ranger College | Burleson, TX |
| F | 13 | Randi Ovalle | 6 ft 7 in (2.01 m) | 225 lb (102 kg) | RS Fr | Success Unlimited Academy | Santiago, Dominican Republic |
| G | 14 | Kamryn Mitchell (W) | 6 ft 4 in (1.93 m) | 185 lb (84 kg) | So | Houston Academy | Dothan, AL |
| F | 15 | Jackson Fields | 6 ft 8 in (2.03 m) | 210 lb (95 kg) | So | Lawrence E. Elkins High School | Missouri City, TX |
| G | 21 | Braydon Whitaker | 6 ft 0 in (1.83 m) | 185 lb (84 kg) | Jr | Enterprise State Community College | Slocomb, AL |
| G | 23 | Aamer Muhammad | 6 ft 1 in (1.85 m) | 195 lb (88 kg) | Sr | Lubbock Christian | Rio Rancho, NM |
| C | 24 | Randarius Jones | 6 ft 7 in (2.01 m) | 235 lb (107 kg) | Jr | Louisiana Southwest Community College | Monroe, LA |
| F | 33 | Theo Seng | 6 ft 9 in (2.06 m) | 220 lb (100 kg) | Jr | Eastern Arizona College | Davis, CA |

Head coach

- Scott Cross (UT Arlington)

Assistant coach(es)

- Greg Young (Howard Payne)
- Brandon Gilbert (North Texas)
- Mike Worley (Denver)
- Larry Cordaro (LSU)
- Kelvin Lewis (Houston)

Legend

- (C) Team captain
- (S) Suspended
- (I) Ineligible
- (W) Walk-on
- Injured
- Current redshirt

Roster
Last update: November 18, 2023

== Schedule and results ==
| Date time, TV | Rank^{#} | Opponent^{#} | Result | Record | High points | High rebounds | High assists | Site (attendance) city, state |
Non-conference regular season
| November 6, 2023*; 11:00 a.m., ESPN+ | | Fort Lauderdale | W 92–47 | 1–0 | 15 – Conerway | 9 – Dowd | 6 – Eugene | Trojan Arena (3,321); Troy, AL |
| November 8, 2023*; 6:00 p.m., ESPN+ | | at Ohio; MAC–SBC Challenge | L 70–88 | 1–1 | 19 – Eugene | 7 – 2 tied | 3 – Eugene | Convocation Center (4,744); Athens, OH |
| November 10, 2023*; 6:00 p.m., P12N | | at Oregon State | L 80–81 ^{2OT} | 1–2 | 22 – Dowd | 8 – Dowd | 6 – Eugene | Gill Coliseum (2,934); Corvallis, OR |
| November 14, 2023*; 7:30 p.m., ESPN+ | | Reinhardt | W 111–46 | 2–2 | 15 – Rigsby Jr. | 8 – Jones | 6 – Conerway | Trojan Arena (2,658); Troy, AL |
| November 20, 2023*; 6:00 p.m., ESPN+ | | Sam Houston; Trojan Classic | L 86–88 ^{OT} | 2–3 | 15 – Eugene | 8 – 2 tied | 5 – Eugene | Trojan Arena (2,321); Troy, AL |
| November 24, 2023*; 4:00 p.m., ESPN+ | | Grambling State; Trojan Classic | W 80–67 | 3–3 | 23 – Eugene | 6 – Dowd | 3 – 2 tied | Trojan Arena (1,843); Troy, AL |
| November 27, 2023*; 6:00 p.m., ESPN+ | | at Eastern Kentucky | L 76–77 | 3–4 | 23 – Eugene | 7 – Dowd | 4 – Muhammad | Baptist Health Arena (1,894); Richmond, KY |
| December 1, 2023*; 7:30 p.m., ESPN+ | | SIU Edwardsville | W 83–60 | 4–4 | 21 – Muhammad | 5 – Seng | 6 – Eugene | Trojan Arena (2,105); Troy, AL |
| December 9, 2023*; 11:30 a.m., USA | | at Dayton | L 70–82 | 4–5 | 16 – Eugene | 6 – Fields | 6 – Eugene | UD Arena (13,407); Dayton, OH |
| December 12, 2023*; 6:00 p.m., ESPN+ | | Southern–New Orleans | W 110–63 | 5–5 | 19 – Eugene | 8 – Seng | 6 – Muhammad | Trojan Arena (1,958); Troy, AL |
| December 19, 2023*; 6:00 p.m., SECN+ | | at No. 25 Ole Miss | L 53–74 | 5–6 | 13 – Conerway | 6 – Valdes | 2 – 4 tied | SJB Pavilion (7,981); Oxford, MS |
| December 21, 2023*; 6:00 p.m., ESPN+ | | Eastern Kentucky | W 88–81 | 6–6 | 24 – Eugene | 6 – Rigsby | 5 – Eugene | Trojan Arena (1,962); Troy, AL |
Sun Belt regular season
| December 30, 2023; 1:00 p.m., ESPN+ | | at Coastal Carolina | W 72–65 | 7–6 (1–0) | 20 – 2 tied | 9 – 2 tied | 3 – Eugene | HTC Center (1,424); Conway, SC |
| January 4, 2024; 6:00 p.m., ESPN+ | | Old Dominion | W 86–73 | 8–6 (2–0) | 15 – Conerway | 11 – Dowd | 5 – Eugene | Trojan Arena (2,889); Troy, AL |
| January 6, 2024; 3:33 p.m., ESPN+ | | Appalachian State | W 66–62 | 9–6 (3–0) | 19 – Muhammad | 7 – Valdes | 3 – 3 tied | Trojan Arena (2,673); Troy, AL |
| January 10, 2024; 7:30 p.m., ESPN+ | | Louisiana | W 79–73 | 10–6 (4–0) | 22 – Eugene | 7 – Eugene | 5 – Conerway | Trojan Arena (2,798); Troy, AL |
| January 13, 2024; 4:00 p.m., ESPN+ | | Southern Miss | W 82–56 | 11–6 (5–0) | 13 – Fields | 7 – 3 tied | 6 – Eugene | Trojan Arena (4,121); Troy, AL |
| January 18, 2024; 7:00 p.m., ESPN+ | | at South Alabama | L 71–74 | 11–7 (5–1) | 18 – Eugene | 10 – Rigsby | 3 – Eugene | Mitchell Center (3,169); Mobile, AL |
| January 20, 2024; 2:00 p.m., ESPN+ | | at Southern Miss | L 63–64 | 11–8 (5–2) | 19 – Eugene | 7 – Dowd | 4 – Muhammad | Reed Green Coliseum (5,587); Hattiesburg, MS |
| January 24, 2024; 6:00 p.m., ESPN+ | | Texas State | W 78–65 | 12–8 (6–2) | 20 – Rigsby | 9 – Rigsby | 6 – Conerway | Trojan Arena (2,248); Troy, AL |
| January 27, 2024; 4:00 p.m., ESPN+ | | South Alabama | W 83–79 | 13–8 (7–2) | 23 – Muhammad | 8 – Muhammad | 4 – Eugene | Trojan Arena (5,110); Troy, AL |
| February 1, 2024; 6:00 p.m., ESPN+ | | at Georgia Southern | W 84–63 | 14–8 (8–2) | 28 – Eugene | 7 – 2 tied | 3 – 3 tied | Hanner Fieldhouse (1,627); Statesboro, GA |
| February 3, 2024; 2:30 p.m., ESPN+ | | at Georgia State | W 78–74 | 15–8 (9–2) | 20 – Rigsby | 7 – 2 tied | 3 – Rigsby | GSU Convocation Center (2,624); Atlanta, GA |
| February 7, 2024; 6:00 p.m., ESPN+ | | Marshall | W 82–66 | 16–8 (10–2) | 19 – Rigsby | 13 – Dowd | 4 – Muhammad | Trojan Arena (3,212); Troy, AL |
| February 10, 2024*; 3:33 p.m., ESPN+ | | Kent State; MAC–SBC Challenge | W 78–68 | 17–8 | 22 – Rigsby | 6 – 2 tied | 4 – Eugene | Trojan Arena (3,912); Troy, AL |
| February 15, 2024; 7:30 p.m., ESPN+ | | Arkansas State | L 71–82 | 17–9 (10–3) | 22 – Muhammad | 9 – Dowd | 3 – Rigsby | Trojan Arena (4,434); Troy, AL |
| February 17, 2024; 4:00 p.m., ESPN+ | | Louisiana–Monroe | W 85–57 | 18–9 (11–3) | 21 – Eugene | 6 – 2 tied | 4 – Conerway | Trojan Arena (4,321); Troy, AL |
| February 22, 2024; 8:00 p.m., ESPNU | | at Arkansas State | L 71–79 | 18–10 (11–4) | 16 – 2 tied | 5 – Dowd | 3 – Valdes | First National Bank Arena (5,107); Jonesboro, AR |
| February 24, 2024; 2:30 p.m., ESPN+ | | at Louisiana–Monroe | W 84–78 | 19–10 (12–4) | 21 – Eugene | 5 – Rigsby | 6 – Conerway | Fant–Ewing Coliseum (1,529); Monroe, LA |
| February 28, 2024; 7:00 p.m., ESPN+ | | at Louisiana | W 87–73 | 20–10 (13–4) | 18 – Eugene | 8 – Eugene | 6 – Rigsby | Cajundome (1,418); Lafayette, LA |
| March 1, 2024; 7:15 p.m., ESPN+ | | at Texas State | L 79–82 ^{OT} | 20–11 (13–5) | 14 – Conerway | 7 – Dowd | 3 – Valdes | Strahan Arena (2,658); San Marcos, TX |
Sun Belt tournament
| March 9, 2024; 5:00 p.m., ESPN+ | (3) | vs. (11) Texas State; Quarterfinals | L 68–74 | 20–12 | 16 – Conerway | 4 – 2 tied | 5 – Conerway | Pensacola Bay Center (2,075); Pensacola, FL |
*Non-conference game. ^{#}Rankings from AP poll. (#) Tournament seedings in parentheses. All times are in Central.
