= 2023–24 Coastal Carolina Chanticleers men's basketball team =

American college basketball season

2023–24 Coastal Carolina Chanticleers men's basketball
- Conference: Sun Belt Conference
- Record: 9–22 (5–13 Sun Belt)
- Head coach: Cliff Ellis (17th season; first 8 games, retired Dec. 6); Benny Moss (interim, rest of season)
- Assistant coaches: Nima Omidvar; Joey Brooks
- Home arena: HTC Center

2023–24 Sun Belt Conference men's basketball standings
	Conf.				Overall
Team	W		L	PCT	W		L	PCT
Appalachian State	16	–	2	.889	27	–	7	.794
James Madison †	15	–	3	.833	32	–	4	.889
Troy	13	–	5	.722	20	–	12	.625
Arkansas State	11	–	7	.611	20	–	17	.541
Louisiana	10	–	8	.556	19	–	14	.576
Southern Miss	9	–	9	.500	16	–	16	.500
Georgia State	8	–	10	.444	14	–	17	.452
South Alabama	8	–	10	.444	16	–	16	.500
Georgia Southern	8	–	10	.444	9	–	24	.273
Marshall	7	–	11	.389	13	–	20	.394
Texas State	7	–	11	.389	17	–	18	.486
Louisiana–Monroe	6	–	12	.333	11	–	19	.367
Coastal Carolina	5	–	13	.278	9	–	22	.290
Old Dominion	3	–	15	.167	7	–	25	.219
† 2024 Sun Belt tournament winner

The 2023–24 Coastal Carolina Chanticleers men's basketball team represented Coastal Carolina University in the 2023–24 NCAA Division I men's basketball season. The Chanticleers played their home games at the HTC Center in Conway, South Carolina as members of the Sun Belt Conference. They were led by 17th-year head coach Cliff Ellis for the first eight games of the season before he retired on December 8, 2023, with longtime associate head coach Benny Moss taking over for the rest of the season. They finished the season 9–22, 5–13 in Sun Belt play, to finish in thirteenth place. As the No. 13 seed in the Sun Belt tournament, they defeated Louisiana–Monroe in the first round, before losing to Louisiana in the second round.

On March 11, 2024, the school named Western Carolina coach Justin Gray the team's new head coach.

== Previous season ==
The Chanticleers finished the 2022–23 season 11–20, 5–13 in Sun Belt play, to finish in twelfth place. They lost to Arkansas State in the first round of the Sun Belt Conference tournament.

== Preseason ==
=== Preseason Sun Belt Conference poll ===
The Chanticleers were picked to finish in 12th place in the conference's preseason poll.

Coaches poll
Predicted finish	Team (1st-place votes)
1	James Madison – 176 (7)
2	App State – 159 (2)
3	Old Dominion – 154 (1)
4	Southern Miss – 148
5	Louisiana – 136 (2)
6	South Alabama – 129 (2)
7	Marshall – 119
8	Troy – 91
9	Arkansas State – 84
10	Texas State – 72
11	Georgia State – 69
12	Coastal Carolina – 59
13	Georgia Southern – 42
14	ULM – 32

== Roster ==
2023–24 Coastal Carolina Chanticleers men's basketball team
Players
Coaches

Pos.	#	Name	Height	Weight	Year	Previous school	Hometown
G	0	Kylan Blackmon	6 ft 3 in (1.91 m)	200 lb (91 kg)	RS Jr	Northeast Mississippi Community College	Oxford, MS
G	2	Brayon Freeman	6 ft 2 in (1.88 m)	180 lb (82 kg)	Jr	Rhode Island	Oxon Hill, MD
F	3	Braeden MacVicar	6 ft 11 in (2.11 m)	220 lb (100 kg)	Fr	Rothesay Netherwood School	Port Williams, NS
G	4	Trevor Barrett	6 ft 3 in (1.91 m)	180 lb (82 kg)	Fr	Trinity Academy	Cary, NC
G	10	Jon Sanders	6 ft 2 in (1.88 m)	180 lb (82 kg)	Jr	East Los Angeles College	Detroit, MI
G	12	Jacob Meyer	6 ft 2 in (1.88 m)	195 lb (88 kg)	Fr	Holy Cross High School	Covington, KY
G	13	Henry Abraham	6 ft 0 in (1.83 m)	185 lb (84 kg)	Sr	Eastern Illinois	Cambridge, MN
G	20	Marcus Saunders (W)	6 ft 2 in (1.88 m)	195 lb (88 kg)	So	Christian Academy of Myrtle Beach	Myrtle Beach, SC
F	21	Jaland Whitehead	6 ft 9 in (2.06 m)	225 lb (102 kg)	Jr	Johnson County Community College	Grand Rapids, MI
C	22	John Ojiako	6 ft 10 in (2.08 m)	245 lb (111 kg)	GS	George Mason	Lagos, Nigeria
C	24	Miroslav Stafl	6 ft 11 in (2.11 m)	250 lb (113 kg)	GS	Central Michigan	Liberec, Czech Republic
G	33	Joey Kahn (W)	6 ft 4 in (1.93 m)	190 lb (86 kg)	RS So	Delta State	Mobile, AL
F	34	Kevin Easley	6 ft 7 in (2.01 m)	230 lb (104 kg)	Sr	Duquesne	Indianapolis, IN
F	35	Ian Granja	6 ft 7 in (2.01 m)	200 lb (91 kg)	So	Memphis	Barcelona, Spain
F	55	Jimmy Nichols	6 ft 8 in (2.03 m)	225 lb (102 kg)	GS	VCU	Conway, SC

Head coach

- Benny Moss (interim) (Charlotte)

Assistant coach(es)

- Nima Omidvar (Maryland)
- Joey Brooks (Notre Dame)

Legend

- (C) Team captain
- (S) Suspended
- (I) Ineligible
- (W) Walk-on
- Injured
- Current redshirt

Roster
Last update: December 9, 2023

== Schedule and results ==
Date time, TV	Rank^{#}	Opponent^{#}	Result	Record	High points	High rebounds	High assists	Site (attendance) city, state
Non-conference regular season
November 6, 2023*; 7:00 p.m., ESPN+		Piedmont	W 88–86	1–0	20 – Easley	13 – Ojiako	5 – Abraham	HTC Center (1,562); Conway, SC
November 16, 2023*; 4:30 p.m., ESPNU		Wichita State; Myrtle Beach Invitational 1st round	L 77–86	1–1	16 – Easley	9 – Meyer	4 – Easley	HTC Center (1,417); Conway, SC
November 17, 2023*; 6:30 p.m., ESPN+		Furman; Myrtle Beach Invitational consolation 2nd round	L 80–89	1–2	23 – Blackmon	9 – Ojiako	5 – Easley	HTC Center (1,266); Conway, SC
November 19, 2023*; 1:00 p.m., ESPN+		Charleston; Myrtle Beach Invitational 7th-place game	L 72–80	1–3	16 – Easley	9 – Ojiako	4 – Sanders	HTC Center (1,172); Conway, SC
November 26, 2023*; 2:00 p.m., ESPN+		North Carolina Central	L 58–70	1–4	14 – Sanders	10 – Ojiako	3 – 2 tied	HTC Center (1,039); Conway, SC
November 29, 2023*; 7:00 p.m., ESPN+		USC Upstate	W 72–70 ^{OT}	2–4	16 – Easley	13 – Ojiako	4 – Sanders	HTC Center (1,244); Conway, SC
December 2, 2023*; 4:00 p.m., ESPN+		Winthrop	L 87–90	2–5	20 – Blackmon	10 – Ojiako	5 – Sanders	HTC Center (1,305); Conway, SC
December 4, 2023*; 7:00 p.m., ESPN+		St. Andrews	W 110–46	3–5	20 – Ojiako	12 – Ojiako	6 – 2 tied	HTC Center (1,114); Conway, SC
December 9, 2023*; 2:00 p.m., ESPN+		Wofford	L 80–88	3–6	17 – Sanders	10 – Ojiako	5 – Meyer	HTC Center (1,239); Conway, SC
December 18, 2023*; 6:00 p.m., FloHoops		at Charleston	L 81–84	3–7	17 – Sanders	13 – Ojiako	6 – Sanders	TD Arena (4,993); Charleston, SC
December 21, 2023*; 7:00 p.m., ESPN+		North Carolina A&T	L 82–85	3–8	19 – Ojiako	12 – Ojiako	5 – 2 tied	HTC Center (1,033); Conway, SC
Sun Belt regular season
December 30, 2023; 2:00 p.m., ESPN+		Troy	L 65–72	3–9 (0–1)	15 – Blackmon	9 – Ojiako	3 – Sanders	HTC Center (1,424); Conway, SC
January 4, 2024; 8:00 p.m., ESPN+		at Texas State	W 71–63	4–9 (1–1)	15 – Freeman	13 – Whitehead	3 – 2 tied	Strahan Arena (1,086); San Marcos, TX
January 6, 2024; 8:00 p.m., ESPN+		at Louisiana	L 77–85	4–10 (1–2)	17 – Blackmon	12 – Ojiako	5 – Sanders	Cajundome (2,383); Lafayette, LA
January 11, 2024; 7:30 p.m., ESPN+		Appalachian State	L 45–70	4–11 (1–3)	13 – Meyer	8 – Whitehead	3 – Sanders	HTC Center (1,838); Conway, SC
January 13, 2024; 3:30 p.m., ESPN+		Old Dominion	W 79–75	5–11 (2–3)	15 – 2 tied	11 – Ojiako	4 – Sanders	HTC Center (1,478); Conway, SC
January 18, 2024; 7:00 p.m., ESPN+		at Georgia Southern	L 70–73	5–12 (2–4)	20 – Ojiako	9 – Ojiako	4 – Sanders	Hanner Fieldhouse (1,821); Statesboro, GA
January 20, 2024; 4:30 p.m., ESPN+		at Appalachian State	L 59–88	5–13 (2–5)	18 – Ojiako	16 – Ojiako	3 – Easley Jr.	Holmes Center (3,174); Boone, NC
January 24, 2024; 7:00 p.m., ESPN+		Southern Miss	L 63–79	5–14 (2–6)	18 – Easley Jr.	9 – Ojiako	3 – Easley Jr.	HTC Center (1,489); Conway, SC
January 27, 2024; 2:00 p.m., ESPN+		Georgia State	W 85–83 ^{OT}	6–14 (3–6)	28 – Easley Jr.	15 – Ojiako	3 – Sanders	HTC Center (1,389); Conway, SC
February 1, 2024; 7:00 p.m., ESPN+		at James Madison	L 67–105	6–15 (3–7)	20 – Meyer	6 – Ojiako	3 – 2 tied	Atlantic Union Bank Center (4,490); Harrisonburg, VA
February 3, 2024; 4:00 p.m., ESPN+		at Marshall	L 74–91	6–16 (3–8)	22 – Meyer	13 – Ojiako	3 – Sanders	Cam Henderson Center (5,711); Huntington, WV
February 7, 2024; 7:30 p.m., ESPN+		at Louisiana–Monroe	L 75–79	6–17 (3–9)	18 – Meyer	13 – Ojiako	6 – Meyer	Fant–Ewing Coliseum (1,392); Monroe, LA
February 15, 2024; 7:00 p.m., ESPN+		Georgia Southern	W 82–75	7–17 (4–9)	31 – Blackmon	10 – MacVicar	2 – 3 tied	HTC Center (1,428); Conway, SC
February 17, 2024; 2:00 p.m., ESPN+		Marshall	W 74–67	8–17 (5–9)	21 – Meyer	12 – Ojiako	4 – 2 tied	HTC Center (1,982); Conway, SC
February 21, 2024; 7:00 p.m., ESPN+		at Georgia State	L 71–72	8–18 (5–10)	23 – Meyer	14 – Ojiako	3 – 2 tied	GSU Convocation Center (1,697); Atlanta, GA
February 24, 2024; 7:00 p.m., ESPN+		at Old Dominion	L 59–75	8–19 (5–11)	17 – Ojiako	13 – Ojiako	3 – 2 tied	Chartway Arena (6,420); Norfolk, VA
February 28, 2024; 7:30 p.m., ESPN+		Arkansas State	L 60–71	8–20 (5–12)	17 – Meyer	15 – Ojiako	3 – 2 tied	HTC Center (1,144); Conway, SC
March 1, 2024; 7:30 p.m., ESPN+		James Madison	L 76–86	8–21 (5–13)	19 – Ojiako	8 – Ojiako	3 – 2 tied	HTC Center (1,513); Conway, SC
Sun Belt tournament
March 5, 2024; 6:00 p.m., ESPN+	(13)	vs. (12) Louisiana–Monroe; First round	W 75–71	9–21	32 – Meyer	7 – 2 tied	5 – Meyer	Pensacola Bay Center (651); Pensacola, FL
March 7, 2024; 3:00 p.m., ESPN+	(13)	vs. (5) Louisiana; Second round	L 66–80	9–22	22 – Meyer	11 – Easley Jr.	3 – Easley Jr.	Pensacola Bay Center (882); Pensacola, FL
*Non-conference game. ^{#}Rankings from AP poll. (#) Tournament seedings in parentheses. All times are in Eastern.
