= Marcus Millender =

American basketball player (born 2004)

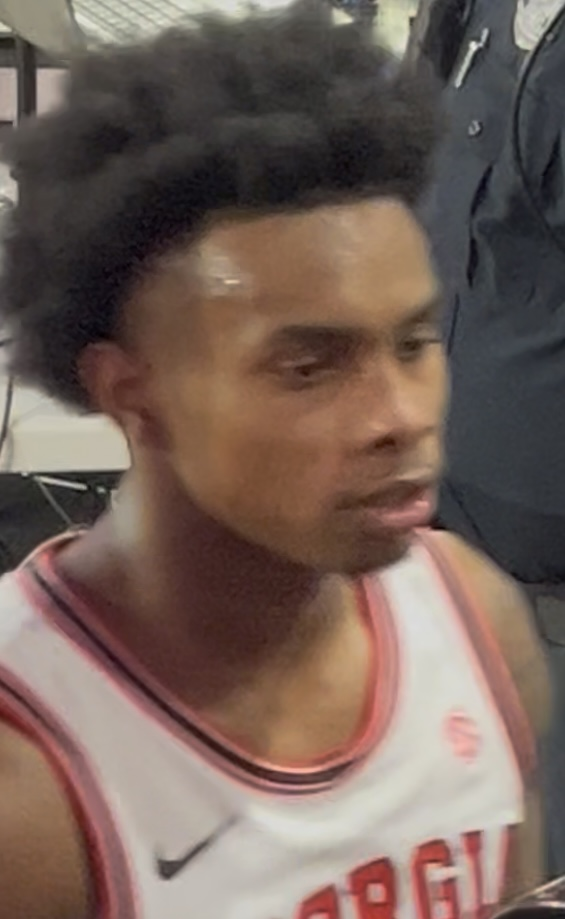
- Millender in 2025

No. 4 – Georgia Bulldogs
- Position: Point guard
- League: Southeastern Conference

Personal information
- Born: November 29, 2004 (age 21)
- Listed height: 5 ft 11 in (1.80 m)
- Listed weight: 175 lb (79 kg)

Career information
- High school: Dickinson (Dickinson, Texas)
- College: South Alabama (2023–2024); UTSA (2024–2025); Georgia (2025–present)

Marcus "Smurf" Millender Jr. (born November 29, 2004) is an American college basketball player for the Georgia Bulldogs of the Southeastern Conference (SEC). He previously played for the South Alabama Jaguars and UTSA Roadrunners.

== Early life ==
Millender attended Dickinson High School in Dickinson, Texas. As a junior at Clear Brook High School, he averaged 16.9 points, 5.3 rebounds and 4.0 assists. Millender enrolled at Dickinson for his senior year but was ruled ineligible to play. Following his high school career, he committed to play college basketball at the University of South Alabama.

== College career ==
As a true freshman, Millender averaged 9.7 points, 3.3 assists and 2.9 rebounds per game before entering the transfer portal. Following the season, he transferred to the University of Texas at San Antonio. As a sophomore, Millender averaged 14.9 points, 3.3 assists, and 3.0 rebounds per game, with a 43.8% three-point percentage. In April 2025, he transferred for a second time to the University of Georgia. In his first season at Georgia, Millender made an instant impact for the Bulldogs. On November 21 against Xavier, he scored 12 points and made the go-ahead three point shot in 78–77 victory. Against Missouri, Millender scored 18 points and scored the game-winning basket.

== Career statistics ==
Legend
GP	Games played	GS	Games started	MPG	Minutes per game
FG%	Field goal percentage	3P%	3-point field goal percentage	FT%	Free throw percentage
RPG	Rebounds per game	APG	Assists per game	SPG	Steals per game
BPG	Blocks per game	PPG	Points per game	**Bold**	Career high

=== College ===
Year	Team	GP	GS	MPG	FG%	3P%	FT%	RPG	APG	SPG	BPG	PPG
2023–24	South Alabama	32	15	28.0	.423	.438	.775	2.9	3.3	.8	.1	9.7
2024–25	UTSA	31	28	34.5	.441	.438	.872	3.0	3.3	1.7	.0	14.9
2025–26	Georgia	33	8	26.1	.452	.386	.840	2.8	4.1	.9	.0	12.0

== Personal life ==
Millender is nicknamed "Smurf" because his parents said that he looked like a Smurf as an infant while wearing a beanie that was too large for his head.
