= 2023–24 Old Dominion Monarchs men's basketball team =

American college basketball season

2023–24 Old Dominion Monarchs men's basketball
- Conference: Sun Belt Conference
- Record: 7–25 (3–15 Sun Belt)
- Head coach: Jeff Jones (11th season; first 9 games); Kieran Donohue (interim, rest of season)
- Assistant coaches: Chris Kovensky; Jamal Robinson; Jordan Brooks
- Home arena: Chartway Arena

2023–24 Sun Belt Conference men's basketball standings
| | Conf. | | | | Overall |
| Team | W | | L | PCT | W | | L | PCT |
|---|---|---|---|---|---|---|---|---|
| Appalachian State | 16 | – | 2 | .889 | 27 | – | 7 | .794 |
| James Madison † | 15 | – | 3 | .833 | 32 | – | 4 | .889 |
| Troy | 13 | – | 5 | .722 | 20 | – | 12 | .625 |
| Arkansas State | 11 | – | 7 | .611 | 20 | – | 17 | .541 |
| Louisiana | 10 | – | 8 | .556 | 19 | – | 14 | .576 |
| Southern Miss | 9 | – | 9 | .500 | 16 | – | 16 | .500 |
| Georgia State | 8 | – | 10 | .444 | 14 | – | 17 | .452 |
| South Alabama | 8 | – | 10 | .444 | 16 | – | 16 | .500 |
| Georgia Southern | 8 | – | 10 | .444 | 9 | – | 24 | .273 |
| Marshall | 7 | – | 11 | .389 | 13 | – | 20 | .394 |
| Texas State | 7 | – | 11 | .389 | 17 | – | 18 | .486 |
| Louisiana–Monroe | 6 | – | 12 | .333 | 11 | – | 19 | .367 |
| Coastal Carolina | 5 | – | 13 | .278 | 9 | – | 22 | .290 |
| Old Dominion | 3 | – | 15 | .167 | 7 | – | 25 | .219 |
† 2024 Sun Belt tournament winner

The 2023–24 Old Dominion Monarchs men’s basketball team represented Old Dominion University during the 2023–24 NCAA Division I men's basketball season. The Monarchs were led by 11th-year head coach Jeff Jones for the first 9 games of the season before he stepped away from the team for health reasons on December 20. Special assistant coach Kieran Donohue took over head coaching duties for the remainder of the season. They played their home games at Chartway Arena in Norfolk, Virginia as second-year members of the Sun Belt Conference.

They finished the season 7–25, 3–15 in Sun Belt play to finish in fourteenth place in their conference. As the No. 14 seed in the Sun Belt tournament, they lost to Texas State in the first round 83–92.

== Previous season ==
The Monarchs finished the 2022–23 season 19–12, 11–7 in Sun Belt play to finish in a tie for fifth place. The Monarchs would lose to Texas State in the second round of the Sun Belt Conference tournament.

== Offseason ==
=== Recruiting classes ===
==== 2023 recruiting class ====
College recruiting
| Name | Hometown | School | Height | Weight | Commit date |
|---|---|---|---|---|---|
| Daniel Pounds; PF | Forest Park, GA | SPIRE Institute | 6 ft 7 in (2.01 m) | 200 lb (91 kg) | Sep 12, 2022 |
| Daniel Pounds; PF | Recruit ratings: No ratings found | | | | |
Overall recruit ranking:
Note: In many cases, Scout, Rivals, 247Sports, On3, and ESPN may conflict in their listings of height and weight.; In these cases, the average was taken. ESPN grades are on a 100-point scale.; Sources: "Old Dominion 2023 Player Commits". ESPN.; "2023 Team Ranking". Rivals.

== Preseason ==
=== Preseason Sun Belt Conference poll ===
The Monarchs were picked to finish in third place in the conference's preseason poll.

Coaches poll
| Predicted finish | Team (1st place Votes) |
| 1 | James Madison - 176 (7) |
| 2 | App State - 159 (2) |
| 3 | Old Dominion - 154 (1) |
| 4 | Southern Miss - 148 |
| 5 | Louisiana - 136 (2) |
| 6 | South Alabama - 129 (2) |
| 7 | Marshall - 119 |
| 8 | Troy - 91 |
| 9 | Arkansas State - 84 |
| 10 | Texas State - 72 |
| 11 | Georgia State - 69 |
| 12 | Coastal Carolina - 59 |
| 13 | Georgia Southern - 42 |
| 14 | ULM - 32 |

== Roster ==
2023–24 Old Dominion Monarchs men's basketball team
Players
Coaches

| Pos. | # | Name | Height | Weight | Year | Previous school | Hometown |
|---|---|---|---|---|---|---|---|
| G | 0 | Vasean Allette (S) | 6 ft 3 in (1.91 m) | 175 lb (79 kg) | Fr | United Scholastic Academy | Toronto, Ontario, Canada |
| G | 1 | Jason Wade | 6 ft 4 in (1.93 m) | 218 lb (99 kg) | Sr | Trinity Episcopal School | Richmond, Virginia |
| G | 2 | Chaunce Jenkins | 6 ft 4 in (1.93 m) | 173 lb (78 kg) | Jr | Wichita State | Newport News, Virginia |
| G | 3 | Imo Essien | 5 ft 11 in (1.8 m) | 170 lb (77 kg) | Jr | Bishop Lynch High School | Wylie, Texas |
| G | 4 | Yamari Allette | 6 ft 3 in (1.91 m) | 190 lb (86 kg) | Fr | United Scholastic Academy | Toronto, Ontario, Canada |
| G | 10 | Tyrone Williams | 6 ft 5 in (1.96 m) | 195 lb (88 kg) | Sr | Oregon | Philadelphia, Pennsylvania |
| F | 11 | Dani Pounds | 6 ft 7 in (2.01 m) | 220 lb (100 kg) | Fr | Spire Institute | Atlanta, Georgia |
| G | 13 | Devin Ceaser | 6 ft 0 in (1.83 m) | 170 lb (77 kg) | So | Buffalo | Waldorf, Maryland |
| G | 15 | R. J. Blakney | 6 ft 6 in (1.98 m) | 205 lb (93 kg) | Jr | Dayton | Baltimore, MD |
| C | 21 | Leeroy Odiahi | 6 ft 11 in (2.11 m) | 215 lb (98 kg) | Jr | Indian Hills Community College | Tralee, Ireland |
| F | 23 | Dericko Williams | 6 ft 7 in (2.01 m) | 220 lb (100 kg) | Sr | Tallahassee Community College | Kinston, North Carolina |
| G | 30 | Cooper Jones (W) | 6 ft 1 in (1.85 m) | 163 lb (74 kg) | So | Walsingham Academy | Williamsburg, Virginia |
| F | 34 | Sam Hood | 6 ft 9 in (2.06 m) | 250 lb (113 kg) | So | Brunswick Community College | Raleigh, North Carolina |
| G | 35 | Jaylen Jenkins | 5 ft 9 in (1.75 m) | 146 lb (66 kg) | Fr | Hampton High School | Hampton, Virginia |
| G | 55 | Bryce Baker | 6 ft 5 in (1.96 m) | 190 lb (86 kg) | So | Donda Academy | Mooresville, North Carolina |

Head coach

- Jeff Jones (Virginia)

Assistant coach(es)

- Chris Kovensky (Old Dominion)
- Jamal Robinson (Virginia)
- Jordan Brooks (Hampton)

Legend

- (C) Team captain
- (S) Suspended
- (I) Ineligible
- (W) Walk-on
- Injured
- Current redshirt

Roster
Last update: 19 November 2023

== Schedule and results ==
After head coach Jeff Jones suffered a heart attack prior to the 2023 Diamond Head Classic, he was temporarily dismissed from the team for health reasons. Special Assistant to the Head Coach Kieran Donohue became the interim head coach for the remainder of the season. On January 28, freshman guard Vasean Allette was dismissed from the team for the remainder of the season.

| Date time, TV | Rank^{#} | Opponent^{#} | Result | Record | High points | High rebounds | High assists | Site (attendance) city, state |
Exhibition
| October 25, 2023*; 7:00 p.m. | | Virginia State | W 80–59 | – | 17 – C. Jenkins | 6 – C. Jenkins | 3 – Tied | Chartway Arena (4,657); Norfolk, VA |
Non-conference regular season
| November 6, 2023*; 7:00 p.m., ESPN+ | | Virginia Wesleyan | W 71–57 | 1–0 | 16 – C. Jenkins | 8 – Williams | 3 – Essien | Chartway Arena (5,371); Norfolk, VA |
| November 11, 2023*; 2:00 p.m., ESPN+ | | at Ball State; MAC-SBC Challenge | L 68–73 | 1–1 | 20 – C. Jenkins | 10 – Williams | 2 – Allette | Worthen Arena (3,218); Muncie, IN |
| November 13, 2023*; 8:00 p.m., SECN+ | | at No. 14 Arkansas | L 77–86 | 1–2 | 21 – C. Jenkins | 7 – C. Jenkins | 5 – Allette | Bud Walton Arena (19,200); Fayetteville, AR |
| November 22, 2023*; 4:00 p.m., ESPN+ | | Princeton | L 56–76 | 1–3 | 15 – Allette | 7 – C. Jenkins | 4 – C. Jenkins | Chartway Arena (4,651); Norfolk, VA |
| November 26, 2023*; 2:00 p.m., ESPN+ | | Drexel | W 68–61 ^{OT} | 2–3 | 21 – Williams | 12 – Williams | 4 – C. Jenkins | Chartway Arena (4,238); Norfolk, VA |
| November 29, 2023*; 7:00 p.m., ESPN+ | | Radford | W 69–68 | 3–3 | 20 – C. Jenkins | 7 – Williams | 5 – C. Jenkins | Chartway Arena (5,292); Norfolk, VA |
| December 2, 2023*; 2:00 p.m., FloSports | | at Northeastern | L 68–81 | 3–4 | 21 – Allette | 10 – Williams | 3 – Allette | Matthews Arena (1,033); Boston, MA |
| December 6, 2023*; 7:00 p.m., FloSports | | at William & Mary; Rivalry | L 79–84 | 3–5 | 30 – Allette | 7 – Allette | 4 – Tied | Kaplan Arena (3,204); Williamsburg, VA |
| December 9, 2023; 7:00 p.m., ESPN+ | | No. 18 James Madison; Royal Rivalry | L 69–84 | 3–6 | 19 – C. Jenkins | 6 – Tied | 3 – C. Jenkins | Chartway Arena (8,504); Norfolk, VA |
| December 21, 2023*; 5:00 p.m., ESPNU | | vs. TCU; Diamond Head Classic Quarterfinals | L 87–111 | 3–7 | 25 – Allette | 5 – Allette | 3 – Allette | Stan Sheriff Center (4,927); Honolulu, HI |
| December 22, 2023*; 7:30 p.m., ESPN+ | | vs. Temple; Diamond Head Classic Consolation Round | W 78–63 | 4–7 | 24 – Allette | 8 – Tied | 5 – C. Jenkins | Stan Sheriff Center (5,077); Honolulu, HI |
| December 24, 2023*; 3:30 p.m., ESPN2 | | vs. UMass; Diamond Head Classic 5th Place Game | L 65–87 | 4–8 | 22 – Williams | 8 – Allette | 2 – Tied | Stan Sheriff Center (4,342); Honolulu, HI |
Sun Belt regular season
| December 30, 2023; 7:00 p.m., ESPN+ | | South Alabama | L 59–61 | 4–9 (0–1) | 15 – Allette | 8 – Williams | 2 – Tied | Chartway Arena (5,479); Norfolk, VA |
| January 4, 2024; 7:00 p.m., ESPN+ | | at Troy | L 73–86 | 4–10 (0–2) | 23 – Ceaser | 12 – Blakney | 2 – Tied | Trojan Arena (2,889); Troy, AL |
| January 6, 2024; 3:00 p.m., ESPN+ | | at Arkansas State | L 75–90 | 4–11 (0–3) | 28 – Allette | 8 – Wade | 2 – Tied | First National Bank Arena (2,193); Jonesboro, AR |
| January 11, 2024; 7:00 p.m., ESPN+ | | at Georgia State | L 70–77 | 4–12 (0–4) | 19 – Allette | 7 – Tied | 9 – Allette | GSU Convocation Center (1,642); Atlanta, GA |
| January 13, 2024; 3:30 p.m., ESPN+ | | at Coastal Carolina | L 75–79 | 4–13 (0–5) | 24 – C. Jenkins | 12 – Allette | 4 – Tied | HTC Center (1,478); Conway, SC |
| January 18, 2024; 7:00 p.m., ESPN+ | | Marshall | W 91–66 | 5–13 (1–5) | 27 – Allette | 8 – Blakney | 8 – Allette | Chartway Arena (6,158); Norfolk, VA |
| January 20, 2024; 7:00 p.m., ESPN+ | | Louisiana–Monroe | L 73–80 | 5–14 (1–6) | 20 – C. Jenkins | 6 – Wade | 3 – C. Jenkins | Chartway Arena (6,088); Norfolk, VA |
| January 24, 2024; 7:00 p.m., ESPN+ | | James Madison; Royal Rivalry | L 62–78 | 5–15 (1–7) | 15 – Allette | 6 – Tied | 5 – Allette | Chartway Arena (6,701); Norfolk, VA |
| January 27, 2024; 7:00 p.m., ESPN+ | | Georgia Southern | L 70–76 | 5–16 (1–8) | 20 – Jenkins | 8 – Odiahi | 6 – C. Jenkins | Chartway Arena (5,519); Norfolk, VA |
| February 1, 2024; 7:00 p.m. | | at Marshall | W 83–76 | 6–16 (2–8) | 20 – Ceaser | 8 – Odiahi | 4 – Essien | Cam Henderson Center (4,309); Huntington, WV |
| February 3, 2024; 4:00 p.m., ESPN+ | | at James Madison; Royal Rivalry | L 63–78 | 6–17 (2–9) | 14 – Ceaser | 6 – Tied | 2 – Tied | Atlantic Union Bank Center (7,633); Harrisonburg, VA |
| February 7, 2024; 8:00 p.m., ESPN+ | | at Southern Miss | L 73–78 | 6–18 (2–10) | 22 – C. Jenkins | 9 – Williams | 2 – Tied | Reed Green Coliseum (3,927); Hattiesburg, MS |
| February 10, 2024*; 7:00 p.m., ESPN+ | | Central Michigan; MAC-SBC Challenge | L 57–58 | 6–19 | 16 – C. Jenkins | 10 – Wade | 3 – Tied | Chartway Arena (4,569); Norfolk, VA |
| February 15, 2024; 7:00 p.m., ESPN+ | | Louisiana | L 60–68 | 6–20 (2–11) | 16 – Jenkins | 9 – Pounds | 4 – C. Jenkins | Chartway Arena (5,265); Norfolk, VA |
| February 17, 2024; 7:00 p.m., ESPN+ | | Georgia State | L 65–68 | 6–21 (2–12) | 22 – C. Jenkins | 7 – Wade | 4 – Essien | Chartway Arena (5,996); Norfolk, VA |
| February 22, 2024; 7:00 p.m., ESPN+ | | Appalachian State | L 67–82 | 6–22 (2–13) | 22 – Ceaser | 8 – Pounds | 3 – C. Jenkins | Chartway Arena (6,157); Norfolk, VA |
| February 24, 2024; 7:00 p.m., ESPN+ | | Coastal Carolina | W 75–59 | 7–22 (3–13) | 33 – Williams | 10 – Pounds | 4 – Ceasar | Chartway Arena (6,420); Norfolk, VA |
| February 28, 2024; 6:30 p.m., ESPN+ | | at Appalachian State | L 64–89 | 7–23 (3–14) | 15 – Tied | 5 – Williams | 3 – Tied | Holmes Center (4,785); Boone, NC |
| March 1, 2024; 7:00 p.m., ESPN+ | | at Georgia Southern | L 75–92 | 7–24 (3–15) | 24 – C. Jenkins | 7 – Wade | 2 – Tied | Hanner Fieldhouse (1,721); Statesboro, GA |
Sun Belt tournament
| March 5, 2024; 8:30 p.m., ESPN+ | (14) | vs. (11) Texas State; First round | L 83–92 ^{OT} | 7–25 | 36 – Williams | 9 – Blakney | 4 – Jenkins | Pensacola Bay Center (795); Pensacola, FL |
*Non-conference game. ^{#}Rankings from AP Poll. (#) Tournament seedings in parentheses. All times are in Eastern.
