= 2023 Diamond Head Classic =

College basketball competition

- Season: 2023–24
- Teams: 8
- Finals site: Stan Sheriff Center, Honolulu, Hawaii
- Champions: Nevada (1st title)
- Runner-up: Georgia Tech (1st title game)
- Semifinalists: TCU (2nd semifinal); Hawai'i (6th semifinal)
- Winning coach: Steve Alford (1st title)
- MVP: Jarod Lucas (Nevada)

The 2023 Diamond Head Classic was a mid-season eight-team college basketball tournament that was played on December 21, 22, and 24 at the Stan Sheriff Center in Honolulu, Hawaii. It was the fourteenth annual Diamond Head Classic tournament, and was part of the 2023–24 NCAA Division I men's basketball season. The 2023 field was announced in May, and featured Georgia Tech, Hawaii, Nevada, Old Dominion, Portland, Temple, TCU and UMass.

== Bracket ==
* – Denotes overtime period

5th place game December 24
Old Dominion	65
UMass	87
7th place game
Temple	55
Portland	54

Consolation 2nd Round; December 22
Temple	63
Old Dominion	78
UMass	100
Portland	78

First Round; December 21
Nevada	80
Temple	56
TCU	111
Old Dominion	87
Georgia Tech	73
UMass	70
Portland	56
Hawai’i	69

Semifinals; December 22
Nevada	88
TCU	75
Georgia Tech	73
Hawai’i	68

Championship; December 24
Nevada	72
Georgia Tech	64
3rd place game
TCU	65
Hawai'i	51

Notes: All games played at the Stan Sheriff Center in Honolulu, Hawaii.
