= Kieran Donohue =

American basketball coach

Biographical details
- Education: Virginia

Coaching career (HC unless noted)
- 2000–2010: American (assistant)
- 2011–2012: American (associate HC)
- 2013–2023: Old Dominion (assistant)
- 2023–2024: Old Dominion (interim HC)

Head coaching record
- Overall: 4–19 (.174)

Kieran Patrick Donohue is an American basketball coach. He was previously an assistant coach and interim head coach for the Old Dominion Monarchs

== College ==
After graduating from Regis High School in New York City, New York where he played basketball, Donohue attended the University of Virginia. Donohue graduated with a bachelor's degree in history in 1997. While at Virginia, Donohue also served as a student manager under future Old Dominion head coach Jeff Jones.

== Coaching career ==
After spending two years as an administrative assistant for the men's basketball team at Boston University, Donohue was hired as an assistant coach for the American Eagles men's basketball team in 2000. Donohue served as an assistant coach until 2011 when he was elevated to associate coach for American. In 2013, Donohue joined the Old Dominion Monarchs men's basketball team to become an assistant coach there. He was an assistant coach there until during the 2023 season, when head coach Jeff Jones suffered a heart attack, causing Donohue to be appointed as interim head coach for the remainder of the season.

== Head coaching record ==
Record table
Season	Team	Overall	Conference	Standing	Postseason
Old Dominion Monarchs (Sun Belt) (2023–2024)
2023–24	Old Dominion	4–19	3–15	14th	
Old Dominion:		4–19 (.174)	3–15 (.167)		
Total:		4–19 (.174)			
National champion Postseason invitational champion Conference regular season champion Conference regular season and conference tournament champion Division regular season champion Division regular season and conference tournament champion Conference tournament champion
