= 2023–24 James Madison Dukes men's basketball team =

American college basketball season

2023–24 James Madison Dukes men's basketball

Cancún Challenge Riviera Division champions Sun Belt tournament champions

NCAA tournament, Second Round
- Conference: Sun Belt Conference
- Record: 32–4 (15–3 Sun Belt)
- Head coach: Mark Byington (4th season)
- Assistant coaches: Xavier Joyner; Jon Cremins; Matt Bucklin
- Home arena: Atlantic Union Bank Center

2023–24 Sun Belt Conference men's basketball standings
	Conf.				Overall
Team	W		L	PCT	W		L	PCT
Appalachian State	16	–	2	.889	27	–	7	.794
James Madison †	15	–	3	.833	32	–	4	.889
Troy	13	–	5	.722	20	–	12	.625
Arkansas State	11	–	7	.611	20	–	17	.541
Louisiana	10	–	8	.556	19	–	14	.576
Southern Miss	9	–	9	.500	16	–	16	.500
Georgia State	8	–	10	.444	14	–	17	.452
South Alabama	8	–	10	.444	16	–	16	.500
Georgia Southern	8	–	10	.444	9	–	24	.273
Marshall	7	–	11	.389	13	–	20	.394
Texas State	7	–	11	.389	17	–	18	.486
Louisiana–Monroe	6	–	12	.333	11	–	19	.367
Coastal Carolina	5	–	13	.278	9	–	22	.290
Old Dominion	3	–	15	.167	7	–	25	.219
† 2024 Sun Belt tournament winner

The 2023–24 James Madison Dukes men's basketball team represented James Madison University in the 2023–24 NCAA Division I men's basketball season. The Dukes were led by fourth-year head coach Mark Byington and played their home games at the Atlantic Union Bank Center in Harrisonburg, Virginia as members of the Sun Belt Conference.

James Madison began the season by beating No. 4-ranked Michigan State, earning their first victory over a ranked opponent since defeating California on December 29, 1992. They followed this up with wins over Kent State and Howard giving them three consecutive wins over 2023 NCAA tournament participants and earning them their first appearance in the AP poll in school history. The Dukes then went on to have their best record to start a season in program history, going 14–0 before they were handed their first loss against Southern Miss. As a result, James Madison left the AP poll after being ranked for eight weeks.

The Dukes finished the regular season with a record of 32–4, 15–3 in Sun Belt play, to finish in second place. They defeated Marshall, Texas State and Arkansas State in the Sun Belt tournament to win the tournament championship. As a result, they received the conference's automatic bid to the NCAA tournament as the No. 12 seed in South region marking the team's first trip to the NCAA tournament since 2013. They upset No. 5-seeded Wisconsin in the first round to advance on to the second round for the first time since 1983. There they lost to Duke in the second round.

On March 25, 2024, head coach Mark Byington left the school to become the head coach at Vanderbilt.

== Previous season ==
The Dukes finished the 2022–23 season 22–11, 12–6 in Sun Belt play, to finish fourth in the conference. They defeated Troy in the first round before losing to South Alabama in the second round of the Sun Belt tournament.

== Offseason ==
=== Incoming transfers ===
Name	Number	Pos.	Height	Weight	Year	Hometown	Previous school
Raekwon Horton	2	F	6' 9"	220	Graduate	Santee, SC	College of Charleston
T. J. Bickerstaff	3	F	6' 9"	220	Graduate	Atlanta, GA	Boston College
Bryant Randleman	4	G	6' 4"	190	Graduate	Durham, NC	High Point
Quincy Allen	10	G/F	6' 8"	190	RS Sophomore	Silver Spring, MD	Colorado
Michael Green III	13	G	6' 0"	155	Graduate	The Bronx, NY	Robert Morris

=== Recruiting ===
==== 2023 recruiting class ====
College recruiting information
Name	Hometown	School	Height	Weight	Commit date
Tyshawn Archie; CG	Houston, TX	C.E. King High School	6 ft 1 in (1.85 m)	160 lb (73 kg)	Oct 7, 2022
Tyshawn Archie; CG	Recruit ratings: No ratings found				
Overall recruit ranking:
Note: In many cases, Scout, Rivals, 247Sports, On3, and ESPN may conflict in their listings of height and weight.; In these cases, the average was taken. ESPN grades are on a 100-point scale.; Sources: "2023 Team Ranking". Rivals.

== Preseason ==
=== Preseason Sun Belt Conference poll ===
The Dukes were picked to finish in first place in the Sun Belt Conference's (SBC) preseason poll. Redshirt junior guard Terrence Edwards Jr. was named to the preseason All-SBC First Team.

Coaches poll
Predicted finish	Team (1st-place votes)
1	James Madison – 176 (7)
2	App State – 159 (2)
3	Old Dominion – 154 (1)
4	Southern Miss – 148
5	Louisiana – 136 (2)
6	South Alabama – 129 (2)
7	Marshall – 119
8	Troy – 91
9	Arkansas State – 84
10	Texas State – 72
11	Georgia State – 69
12	Coastal Carolina – 59
13	Georgia Southern – 42
14	ULM – 32

== Roster ==
2023–24 James Madison Dukes men's basketball team
Players
Coaches

Pos.	#	Name	Height	Weight	Year	Previous school	Hometown
G	0	Xavier Brown	6 ft 2 in (1.88 m)	170 lb (77 kg)	So	Jamestown HS	Williamsburg, VA
G	1	Noah Freidel	6 ft 4 in (1.93 m)	210 lb (95 kg)	RS Sr	South Dakota State	Tea, SD
F	2	Raekwon Horton	6 ft 6 in (1.98 m)	215 lb (98 kg)	Jr	College of Charleston	Santee, SC
F	3	T. J. Bickerstaff	6 ft 9 in (2.06 m)	220 lb (100 kg)	GS	Boston College	Atlanta, GA
G	4	Bryant Randleman	6 ft 4 in (1.93 m)	190 lb (86 kg)	GS	High Point	Durham, NC
G/F	5	Terrence Edwards Jr.	6 ft 6 in (1.98 m)	190 lb (86 kg)	RS Jr	Tucker HS	Atlanta, GA
G/F	10	Quincy Allen	6 ft 8 in (2.03 m)	190 lb (86 kg)	RS So	Colorado	Silver Spring, MD
F	11	Justin Amadi	6 ft 7 in (2.01 m)	225 lb (102 kg)	RS Jr	Paul M. Dorman HS	Greenville, SC
G	12	Brycen Blaine	6 ft 5 in (1.96 m)	195 lb (88 kg)	So	Berkmar HS	Richmond, VA
G	13	Michael III Green	6 ft 0 in (1.83 m)	155 lb (70 kg)	GS	Robert Morris	The Bronx, NY
F	15	Jaylen Carey	6 ft 8 in (2.03 m)	245 lb (111 kg)	Fr	Westminster Academy	Davie, FL
G	20	Jarrell Pope	5 ft 9 in (1.75 m)	185 lb (84 kg)	Jr	Princess Anne HS	Virginia Beach, VA
G	21	Hollman Smith (W)	6 ft 0 in (1.83 m)	185 lb (84 kg)	Sr	Tilton School	Falls Church, VA
F	22	Julien Wooden	6 ft 8 in (2.03 m)	225 lb (102 kg)	RS Sr	Northside HS	Roanoke, VA
G	30	Aidan Mckeon	6 ft 3 in (1.91 m)	195 lb (88 kg)	Fr	Freeman HS	Henrico, VA
F	33	Jerrell Roberson	6 ft 9 in (2.06 m)	225 lb (102 kg)	So	DeMatha HS	Upper Marlboro, MD
F	35	Shane Feden (W)	6 ft 6 in (1.98 m)	175 lb (79 kg)	Jr	Woodbridge HS	Woodbridge, VA

Head coach

- Mark Byington (UNC Wilmington)

Assistant coach(es)

- Xavier Joyner (Husson)
- Jon Cremins (Valdosta State)
- Matt Bucklin (Georgia)

Legend

- (C) Team captain
- (S) Suspended
- (I) Ineligible
- (W) Walk-on
- Injured
- Current redshirt

Roster
Last update: November 21, 2023

== Schedule and results ==
Date time, TV	Rank^{#}	Opponent^{#}	Result	Record	High points	High rebounds	High assists	Site (attendance) city, state
Regular season
November 6, 2023*; 8:30 p.m., BTN		at No. 4 Michigan State	W 79–76 ^{OT}	1–0	24 – Edwards	14 – Bickerstaff	3 – 3 tied	Breslin Center (14,797); East Lansing, MI
November 9, 2023*; 7:00 p.m., ESPN+		at Kent State; MAC–SBC Challenge	W 113–108 ^{2OT}	2–0	25 – Edwards	10 – Edwards	6 – Edwards	MAC Center (3,126); Kent, OH
November 12, 2023*; 4:00 p.m., ESPN+		Howard	W 107–86	3–0	22 – Wooden	8 – Horton	8 – Green III	Atlantic Union Bank Center (4,443); Harrisonburg, VA
November 17, 2023*; 7:00 p.m., ESPN+	No. 24	Radford; Cancún Challenge campus-site game	W 76–73	4–0	21 – Edwards	8 – Bickerstaff	5 – Green III	Atlantic Union Bank Center (8,014); Harrisonburg, VA
November 21, 2023*; 6:00 p.m., CBSSN	No. 22	vs. Southern Illinois; Cancún Challenge Riviera Division semifinals	W 82–76	5–0	24 – Edwards	7 – Bickerstaff	5 – Edwards	Hard Rock Hotel Riviera Maya (417); Cancún, Mexico
November 22, 2023*; 8:30 p.m., CBSSN	No. 22	vs. Fresno State; Cancún Challenge Riviera Division championship	W 95–64	6–0	26 – Freidel	5 – Bickerstaff	4 – Wooden	Hard Rock Hotel Riviera Maya (683); Cancún, Mexico
November 29, 2023*; 7:00 p.m., ESPN+	No. 22	Buffalo	W 81–66	7–0	18 – Bickerstaff	7 – Bickerstaff	5 – Green III	Atlantic Union Bank Center (5,106); Harrisonburg, VA
December 3, 2023*; 1:00 p.m., ESPN+	No. 22	Keystone	W 130–59	8–0	21 – Green III	13 – Bickerstaff	5 – Bickerstaff	Atlantic Union Bank Center (3,272); Harrisonburg, VA
December 9, 2023; 7:00 p.m., ESPN+	No. 18	at Old Dominion; Royal Rivalry	W 84–69	9–0	21 – Bickerstaff	12 – Bickerstaff	9 – Green III	Chartway Arena (8,504); Norfolk, VA
December 16, 2023*; 2:00 p.m., FloHoops	No. 20	at Hampton	W 88–71	10–0	17 – Brown	10 – Carey	8 – Green III	Hampton Convocation Center (2,068); Hampton, VA
December 19, 2023*; 7:00 p.m., ESPN+	No. 20	Coppin State	W 87–48	11–0	18 – Bickerstaff	7 – Bickerstaff	4 – Green III	Atlantic Union Bank Center (3,214); Harrisonburg, VA
December 22, 2023*; 1:00 p.m., −	No. 20	at Morgan State	W 89–75	12–0	29 – Edwards	9 – Edwards	5 – Brown	Talmadge L. Hill Field House (878); Baltimore, MD
December 30, 2023; 2:00 p.m., ESPN+	No. 20	Texas State	W 82–65	13–0 (1–0)	21 – Bickerstaff	10 – Bickerstaff	5 – Bickerstaff	Atlantic Union Bank Center (4,617); Harrisonburg, VA
January 4, 2024; 8:00 p.m., ESPN+	No. 19	at Louisiana	W 68–61	14–0 (2–0)	19 – Edwards Jr.	11 – Bickerstaff	5 – Edwards Jr.	Cajundome (2,349); Lafayette, LA
January 6, 2024; 3:00 p.m., ESPN+	No. 19	at Southern Miss	L 71–81	14–1 (2–1)	15 – Edwards Jr.	16 – Bickerstaff	3 – 2 tied	Reed Green Coliseum (4,107); Hattiesburg, MS
January 11, 2024; 7:00 p.m., ESPN+		South Alabama	W 89–55	15–1 (3–1)	26 – Freidel	10 – Bickerstaff	5 – Randleman	Atlantic Union Bank Center (3,147); Harrisonburg, VA
January 13, 2024; 4:00 p.m., ESPN+		Appalachian State	L 55–59	15–2 (3–2)	19 – Edwards	7 – Bickerstaff	4 – Edwards	Atlantic Union Bank Center (7,761); Harrisonburg, VA
January 18, 2024; 8:00 p.m., ESPN+		Louisiana–Monroe	W 89–70	16–2 (4–2)	31 – Wooden	8 – Carey	6 – Edwards Jr.	Atlantic Union Bank Center (4,033); Harrisonburg, VA
January 20, 2024; 6:00 p.m., ESPN+		Marshall	W 67–52	17–2 (5–2)	20 – Edwards Jr.	11 – Bickerstaff	5 – 2 tied	Atlantic Union Bank Center (6,061); Harrisonburg, VA
January 24, 2024; 7:00 p.m., ESPN+		at Old Dominion; Royal Rivalry	W 78–62	18–2 (6–2)	23 – Wooden	12 – Bickerstaff	5 – 2 tied	Chartway Arena (6,701); Norfolk, VA
January 27, 2024; 6:00 p.m., ESPN2		at Appalachian State	L 76–82	18–3 (6–3)	25 – Edwards, Jr.	12 – Bickerstaff	5 – Green	Holmes Center (8,052); Boone, NC
February 1, 2024; 7:00 p.m., ESPN+		Coastal Carolina	W 105–67	19–3 (7–3)	19 – Bickerstaff	7 – 2 tied	7 – Brown	Atlantic Union Bank Center (4,490); Harrisonburg, VA
February 3, 2024; 4:00 p.m., ESPN+		Old Dominion; Royal Rivalry	W 78–63	20–3 (8–3)	18 – Friedel	10 – Horton	3 – 2 tied	Atlantic Union Bank Center (7,633); Harrisonburg, VA
February 7, 2024; 8:00 p.m., ESPN+		at Arkansas State	W 77–73	21–3 (9–3)	19 – Friedel	10 – Friedel	5 – Brown	First National Bank Arena (3,824); Jonesboro, AR
February 10, 2024*; 4:00 p.m., ESPN2		Akron; MAC–SBC Challenge	W 73–59	22–3	17 – Green III	9 – Horton	4 – Green III	Atlantic Union Bank Center (6,454); Harrisonburg, VA
February 15, 2024; 8:00 p.m., ESPN+		Georgia State	W 83–63	23–3 (10–3)	28 – Edwards	9 – 2 tied	3 – Edwards	Atlantic Union Bank Center (4,162); Harrisonburg, VA
February 17, 2024; 6:00 p.m., ESPN+		Georgia Southern	W 87–80	24–3 (11–3)	19 – Edwards Jr.	5 – 2 tied	3 – 3 tied	Atlantic Union Bank Center (6,796); Harrisonburg, VA
February 21, 2024; 7:00 p.m., ESPN+		at Marshall	W 84–58	25–3 (12–3)	19 – Freidel	9 – Freidel	6 – Green III	Cam Henderson Center (4,595); Huntington, WV
February 24, 2024; 5:00 p.m., ESPN+		at Georgia Southern	W 80–74	26–3 (13–3)	20 – Edwards	10 – Bickerstaff	6 – Edwards	Hanner Fieldhouse (2,342); Statesboro, GA
February 28, 2024; 7:00 p.m., ESPN+		at Georgia State	W 84–78	27–3 (14–3)	30 – Edwards	13 – Bickerstaff	5 – Edwards	GSU Convocation Center (1,988); Atlanta, GA
March 1, 2024; 7:30 p.m., ESPN+		at Coastal Carolina	W 86–76	28–3 (15–3)	18 – Edwards Jr.	8 – Freidel	6 – Edwards Jr.	HTC Center (1,513); Conway, SC
Sun Belt tournament
March 9, 2024; 8:30 p.m., ESPN+	(2)	vs. (10) Marshall; Quarterfinals	W 81–64	29–3	18 – Edwards	11 – Bickerstaff	6 – Edwards	Pensacola Bay Center (2,501); Pensacola, FL
March 10, 2024; 8:30 p.m., ESPN+	(2)	vs. (11) Texas State; Semifinals	W 73–68	30–3	28 – Freidel	11 – Bickerstaff	6 – Edwards	Pensacola Bay Center (−); Pensacola, FL
March 11, 2024; 7:00 p.m., ESPN	(2)	vs. (4) Arkansas State; Championship	W 91–71	31–3	21 – Brown	10 – Brown	3 – 3 tied	Pensacola Bay Center (2,548); Pensacola, FL
NCAA tournament
March 22, 2024; 9:40 p.m., CBS	(12 S)	vs. (5 S) No. 23 Wisconsin; First Round	W 72–61	32–3	14 – Edwards	9 – Bickerstaff	3 – 2 tied	Barclays Center (17,487); Brooklyn, NY
March 24, 2024; 5:15 p.m., CBS	(12 S)	vs. (4 S) No. 13 Duke; Second Round	L 55–93	32–4	13 – Edwards	5 – 3 tied	2 – 3 tied	Barclays Center (17,505); Brooklyn, NY
*Non-conference game. ^{#}Rankings from AP poll. (#) Tournament seedings in parentheses. S=South. All times are in Eastern.

== Rankings ==
Ranking movements Legend: ██ Increase in ranking ██ Decrease in ranking — = Not ranked RV = Received votes
	Week																				
Poll	Pre	1	2	3	4	5	6	7	8	9	10	11	12	13	14	15	16	17	18	19	Final
AP	—	24	22	22	18	20	20	20	19	RV	RV	—	—	—	—	—	—	RV	RV	RV	RV
Coaches	—	RV	RV	23	24	20	21	21	20	RV	RV	RV	—	—	RV	RV	RV	RV	RV	RV	RV
