= Mark Byington =

American basketball coach (born 1976)

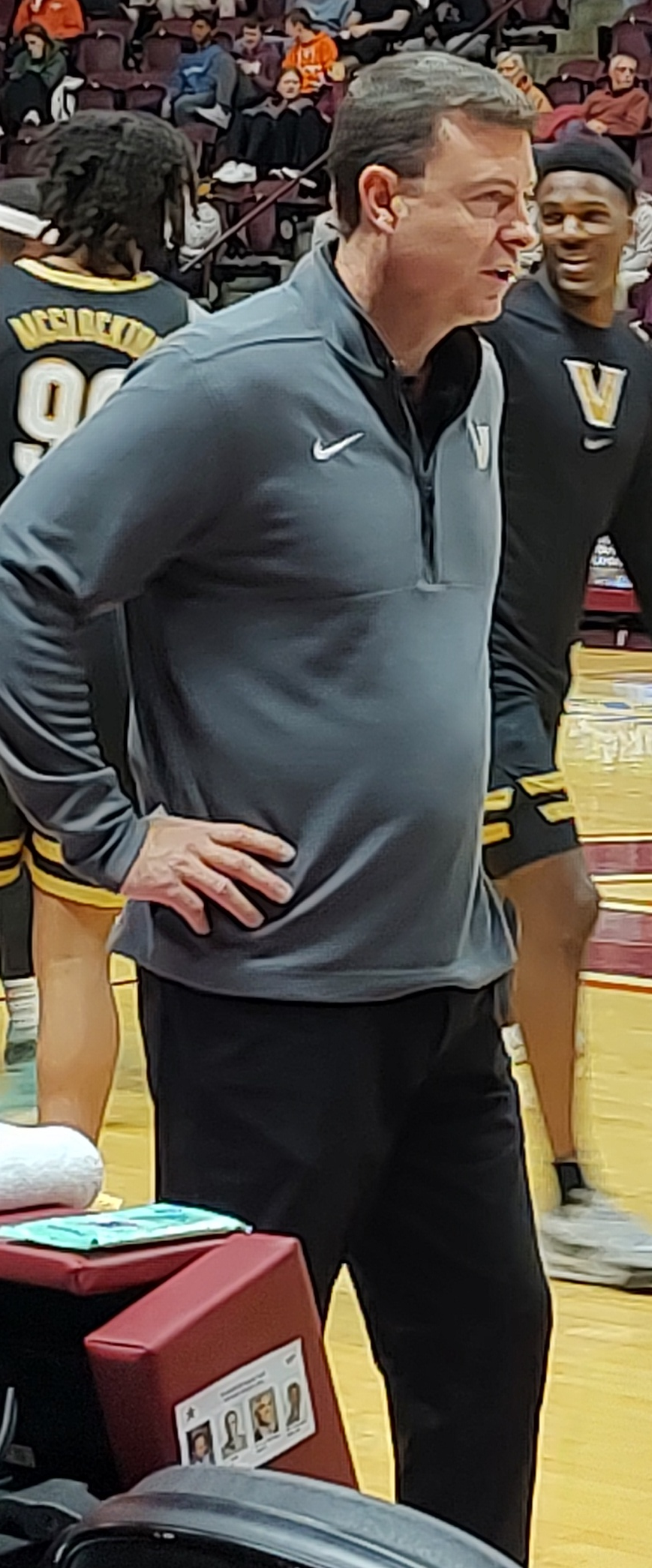
- Byington in 2024

Current position
- Title: Head coach
- Team: Vanderbilt
- Conference: SEC
- Record: 52–22 (.703)

Biographical details
- Born: April 22, 1976 (age 50); Salem, Virginia, U.S.

Playing career
- 1994–1998: UNC Wilmington
- Position: Guard

Coaching career (HC unless noted)
- 2002–2004: Charleston (asst.)
- 2004–2005: Virginia (asst.)
- 2005–2012: Charleston (asst.)
- 2012: Charleston (interim HC)
- 2012–2013: Virginia Tech (asst.)
- 2013–2020: Georgia Southern
- 2020–2024: James Madison
- 2024–present: Vanderbilt

Head coaching record
- Overall: 272–160 (.630)
- Tournaments: 2–3 (NCAA Division I); 0–1 (CBI)

Accomplishments and honors

Championships
- CAA regular season (2021); Sun Belt tournament (2024)

Awards
- Skip Prosser Man of the Year Award (2025); CAA Coach of the Year (2021)

Mark Byington (born April 22, 1976) is an American basketball coach and former player who is currently the head men's basketball coach at Vanderbilt University. He previously served as the head basketball coach at Georgia Southern University and James Madison University.

== Playing career ==
=== High school ===
Mark Byington played high school basketball at Salem High School located in Salem, Virginia. He led the Salem Spartans, coached by former Dobyns-Bennett head coach Charlie Morgan, to a 26–1 record in the 1993–94 season and to the Group AA state championship, defeating Louisa County. His #32 jersey has since been retired by Salem High School, along with #11 Richard Morgan, who was an All-American.

=== College ===
Byington was a three-year starter for the UNC Wilmington basketball team. He was awarded 2nd-team All-Colonial Athletic Association and All-CAA Defensive Team honors his senior year. In his four years at UNCW, he was a two-time CAA All-Academic selection and scored more than 1,000 points during his career.

Byington holds a Master's degree in sports psychology from the University of Virginia.

== Coaching career ==
Byington spent nine seasons as an assistant coach at the College of Charleston, including seven as Bobby Cremins’ top assistant. The College of Charleston compiled a record of 194–100 and a 108–51 record in the Southern Conference during the years when Byington was an assistant coach. During those seasons, they also recorded six 20-win seasons, logged three Southern Conference South Division regular-season titles, advanced to the league's tournament championship game three times and made two appearances in the NIT.

After a one-year assistant coaching stop at Virginia Tech, Byington was hired as the head coach at Georgia Southern. In seven seasons with the Eagles, he guided them to a 131–97 overall record, with three-straight 20-win seasons in his final three seasons. On March 20, 2020, Byington was named the 11th head coach in James Madison history, replacing Louis Rowe.

In March 2024, Byington was hired by Vanderbilt University as its head coach.

== Head coaching record ==
Record table
Season	Team	Overall	Conference	Standing	Postseason
College of Charleston Cougars (Southern Conference) (2011–2012)
2011–12	College of Charleston	7–4*	6–3*	4th (South)	
College of Charleston:		7–4 (.636)	6–3 (.667)		
Georgia Southern Eagles (Southern Conference) (2013–2014)
2013–14	Georgia Southern	15–19	6–10	T–7th	
Georgia Southern Eagles (Sun Belt Conference) (2014–2020)
2014–15	Georgia Southern	22–9	14–6	T–2nd	
2015–16	Georgia Southern	14–17	10–10	5th	
2016–17	Georgia Southern	18–15	11–7	T–3rd	CBI first round
2017–18	Georgia Southern	21–12	11–7	3rd	
2018–19	Georgia Southern	21–12	12–6	T–2nd	
2019–20	Georgia Southern	20–13	12–8	T–4th	No postseason held
Georgia Southern:		131–97 (.575)	78–54 (.591)		
James Madison Dukes (Colonial Athletic Association) (2020–2022)
2020–21	James Madison	13–7	8–2	T–1st	
2021–22	James Madison	15–14	6–12	8th	
James Madison Dukes (Sun Belt Conference) (2022–2024)
2022–23	James Madison	22–11	12–6	4th	
2023–24	James Madison	32–4	15–3	2nd	NCAA Division I Round of 32
James Madison:		82–36 (.695)	41–23 (.641)		
Vanderbilt Commodores (Southeastern Conference) (2024–present)
2024–25	Vanderbilt	20–13	8–10	T–9th	NCAA Division I Round of 64
2025–26	Vanderbilt	27–9	11–7	T–4th	NCAA Division I Round of 32
2026–27	Vanderbilt	5–0	0–0		
Vanderbilt:		52–22 (.703)	19–17 (.528)		
Total:		272–160 (.630)			
National champion Postseason invitational champion Conference regular season champion Conference regular season and conference tournament champion Division regular season champion Division regular season and conference tournament champion Conference tournament champion

*Byington served as interim head coach after Bobby Cremins took a medical leave of absence.
