= 2023–24 Miami RedHawks men's basketball team =

American college basketball season

2023–24 Miami RedHawks men's basketball
- Conference: Mid-American Conference
- Record: 15–17 (9–9 MAC)
- Head coach: Travis Steele (2nd season)
- Assistant coaches: Rob Summers (2nd season); Jonathan Holmes (2nd season); Khristian Smith (2nd season)
- Home arena: Millett Hall

2023–24 Mid-American Conference men's basketball standings
	Conf.				Overall
Team	W		L	PCT	W		L	PCT
Toledo	14	–	4	.778	20	–	12	.625
Akron †	13	–	5	.722	24	–	11	.686
Ohio	13	–	5	.722	20	–	13	.606
Central Michigan	12	–	6	.667	18	–	14	.563
Bowling Green	10	–	8	.556	20	–	14	.588
Western Michigan	9	–	9	.500	12	–	20	.375
Miami (OH)	9	–	9	.500	15	–	17	.469
Kent State	8	–	10	.444	17	–	17	.500
Ball State	7	–	11	.389	15	–	16	.484
Eastern Michigan	6	–	12	.333	13	–	18	.419
Northern Illinois	5	–	13	.278	11	–	20	.355
Buffalo	2	–	16	.111	4	–	27	.129
† 2024 MAC tournament winner

The 2023–24 Miami RedHawks men's basketball team represented Miami University in the 2023–24 NCAA Division I men's basketball season. The RedHawks, led by second-year head coach Travis Steele, played their home games at Millett Hall in Oxford, Ohio as members of the Mid-American Conference. They finished the regular season 15–16, 9–9 in MAC play to finish tied for 6th place. They lost to Akron in the first round of the MAC tournament

== Previous season ==
The RedHawks finished the season 12–20 and 6–12 in the MAC. As the eighth seed in the MAC tournament they lost to Toledo in the first round.

== Offseason ==
=== Departures ===
Departures
Name	Pos.	Height	Weight	Year	Hometown	Notes
Javin Etzler	F	6'8"	206	Junior	Convoy, Ohio	Transferred to Ashland
Kamari Williams	F	6'7"	170	Junior	Sandy Spring, Maryland	Entered Transfer Portal
Mekhi Lairy	F	5'8"	145	Grad. Student	Evansville, Indiana	Exhausted Eligibility
Bryson Tatum	G	6'4"	180	Sophomore	Urbana, Illinois	Entered Transfer Portal
Mitchell Rylee	F	6'8"	215	Freshman	Fort Mitchell, Kentucky	Transferred to Thomas More
Billy Smith	G	6'7"	200	Freshman	Indianapolis, Indiana	Transferred to Bellarmine
Jackson Kenyon	F	6'8"	215	Senior	Deerfield, Illinois	
Will Stevens	G	6'5"	185	Senior	Chicago, Illinois	Entered Transfer Portal
Curtis Harrison	F	6'7"	225	Sophomore	Cincinnati, Ohio	Transferred to Midland College

=== Incoming transfers ===
Transfers
Name	Pos.	Height	Weight	Year	Hometown	Previous school
Bradley Dean	G	6'2"	170	Junior	Gate City, Virginia	Transferred from Virginia–Wise
Darweshi Hunter	G/F	6'5"	200	Grad. Student	Phoenix, Arizona	Transferred from Northern Illinois
Bryson Bultman	G	6'5"	200	Grad. Student	Nashville, Illinois	Transferred from McKendree

=== Recruiting class ===
College recruiting information
Name	Hometown	School	Height	Weight	Commit date
Eian Elmer; G/F	Cincinnati, Ohio	Robert A. Taft Information Technology High School	6 ft 6 in (1.98 m)	190 lb (86 kg)	
Eian Elmer; G/F	Recruit ratings: Scout: Rivals: 247Sports: (NR)				
Evan Ipsaro; G	Crestview Hills, Kentucky	Covington Catholic High School	6 ft 0 in (1.83 m)	200 lb (91 kg)	
Evan Ipsaro; G	Recruit ratings: Scout: Rivals: 247Sports: (NR)				
Mekhi Cooper; G	Bolingbrook, Illinois	Bolingbrook High School	6 ft 1 in (1.85 m)	160 lb (73 kg)	
Mekhi Cooper; G	Recruit ratings: Scout: Rivals: 247Sports: (NR)				
Jackson Kotecki; G/F	Chicago, Illinois	St. Ignatius College Prep	6 ft 9 in (2.06 m)	230 lb (100 kg)	
Jackson Kotecki; G/F	Recruit ratings: Scout: Rivals: 247Sports: (NR)				
Blake Anderson; G	Evansville, Indiana	Reitz Memorial High School	6 ft 3 in (1.91 m)	190 lb (86 kg)	
Blake Anderson; G	Recruit ratings: Scout: Rivals: 247Sports: (NR)				
Reece Potter; C	Lexington, Kentucky	Lexington Catholic High School	7 ft 1 in (2.16 m)	190 lb (86 kg)	Aug 17, 2022
Reece Potter; C	Recruit ratings: Scout: Rivals: 247Sports: (NR)				
Hampton Dauparas; F	Long Beach, Indiana	La Lumiere School	6 ft 5 in (1.96 m)	225 lb (102 kg)	
Hampton Dauparas; F	Recruit ratings: Scout: Rivals: 247Sports: (NR)				
Overall recruit ranking:
Note: In many cases, Scout, Rivals, 247Sports, On3, and ESPN may conflict in their listings of height and weight.; In these cases, the average was taken. ESPN grades are on a 100-point scale.; Sources: "2023 Team Ranking". Rivals.

== Roster ==
2023–24 Miami RedHawks men's basketball team
Players
Coaches

Pos.	#	Name	Height	Weight	Year	Hometown
G/F	0	Eian Elmer	6 ft 6 in (1.98 m)	190 lb (86 kg)	Fr	Cincinnati, Ohio
G	1	Bradley Dean	6 ft 2 in (1.88 m)	170 lb (77 kg)	Jr	Gate City, Virginia
G	2	Evan Ipsaro	6 ft 0 in (1.83 m)	200 lb (91 kg)	Fr	Crestview Hills, Kentucky
G/F	3	Julian Lewis	6 ft 6 in (1.98 m)	200 lb (91 kg)	Jr	Ann Arbor, Michigan
G/F	4	Darweshi Hunter	6 ft 5 in (1.96 m)	200 lb (91 kg)	GS	Phoenix, Arizona
G	5	Eli Yofan	6 ft 2 in (1.88 m)	190 lb (86 kg)	So	Pittsburgh, Pennsylvania
G	11	Mekhi Cooper	6 ft 1 in (1.85 m)	160 lb (73 kg)	Fr	Bolingbrook, Illinois
G	13	Ryan Mabrey	6 ft 5 in (1.96 m)	195 lb (88 kg)	So	Belmar, New Jersey
F	14	Hampton Dauparas	6 ft 5 in (1.96 m)	225 lb (102 kg)	Fr	Long Beach, Indiana
F	21	Jaquel Morris	6 ft 8 in (2.03 m)	220 lb (100 kg)	So	Floral Park, New York
G	22	Morgan Safford	6 ft 5 in (1.96 m)	210 lb (95 kg)	RS Sr	Columbus, Ohio
F	24	Jackson Kotecki	6 ft 9 in (2.06 m)	230 lb (104 kg)	Fr	Chicago, Illinois
F	25	Bryce Bultman	6 ft 5 in (1.96 m)	200 lb (91 kg)		Nashville, Illinois
G	33	Blake Anderson	6 ft 3 in (1.91 m)	190 lb (86 kg)	Fr	Evansville, Indiana
C	35	Reece Potter	7 ft 1 in (2.16 m)	210 lb (95 kg)	Fr	Lexington, Kentucky
F	45	Anderson Mirambeaux	6 ft 8 in (2.03 m)	305 lb (138 kg)	Sr	Santo Domingo, Dominican Republic

Head coach

- Travis Steele (Butler)

Assistant coach(es)

- Rob Summers (West Virginia)
- Jonathan Holmes (North Carolina)
- Khristian Smith (Indiana State)

Legend

- (C) Team captain
- (S) Suspended
- (I) Ineligible
- (W) Walk-on
- Injured
- Current redshirt

Roster
Last update: September 29, 2023

== Schedule and results ==
Date time, TV	Rank^{#}	Opponent^{#}	Result	Record	High points	High rebounds	High assists	Site (attendance) city, state
Non-conference regular season
November 6, 2023*; 8:00 p.m., ESPN+		at Evansville	L 64–72	0–1	21 – Hunter	7 – Elmer	3 – Mabrey	Ford Center (3,147); Evansville, IN
November 11, 2023*; 11:00 a.m., ESPN+		Texas State; MAC-SBC Challenge	L 65–75	0–2	21 – Hunter	8 – Morris	4 – Bultman	Millett Hall (1,636); Oxford, OH
November 17, 2023*; 7:00 p.m., ESPN+		Coppin State	W 76–48	1–2	21 – Bultman	6 – Tied	5 – Hunter	Millett Hall (1,628); Oxford, OH
November 19, 2023*; 1:00 p.m., ESPN+		Eastern Illinois	W 76–64	2–2	18 – Ipsaro	7 – Morris	4 – Bultman	Millett Hall (1,063); Oxford, OH
November 25, 2023*; 2:00 p.m.		at St. Bonaventure	L 60–90	2–3	17 – Hunter	5 – Elmer	5 – Ipsaro	Reilly Center (3,433); Olean, NY
November 28, 2023*; 7:00 p.m., ESPN+		Spalding	W 82–43	3–3	19 – Kotecki	8 – Morris	6 – Dean	Millett Hall (1,278); Oxford, OH
December 2, 2023*; 7:00 p.m., ESPN+		at Marshall	W 79–74	4–3	17 – Cooper	7 – Bultman	5 – Hunter	Cam Henderson Center (4,233); Huntington, WV
December 6, 2023*; 7:00 p.m., BTN+		at Ohio State	L 64–84	4–4	15 – Hunter	10 – Morris	4 – Morris	Value City Arena (9,098); Columbus, OH
December 9, 2023*; 2:00 p.m., ESPN+		at Davidson	L 61–79	4–5	15 – Mabrey	4 – Bultman	3 – Cooper	John M. Belk Arena (2,838); Davidson, NC
December 19, 2023*; 7:00 p.m., ESPN+		at Wright State	L 82–92	4–6	27 – Holden	12 – Noel	4 – Calvin	Nutter Center (3,814); Dayton, OH
December 22, 2023*; 1:00 p.m., ESPN+		Vermont	W 70–69	5–6	17 – Hunter	8 – Bultman	2 – Tied	Millett Hall (1,186); Oxford, OH
December 29, 2023*; 7:00 p.m., ESPN+		Wilberforce	W 119–69	6–6	17 – Ipsaro	10 – Cooper	8 – Cooper	Millett Hall (1,160); Oxford, OH
MAC regular season
January 2, 2024; 7:00 p.m., ESPN+		Western Michigan	L 74–83	6–7 (0–1)	20 – Mirambeaux	5 – Elmer	7 – Ipsaro	Millett Hall (1,005); Oxford, OH
January 5, 2024; 7:00 p.m., CBSSN		at Toledo	L 64–68	6–8 (0–2)	18 – Hunter	11 – Bultman	6 – Bultman	Savage Arena (4,428); Toledo, OH
January 9, 2024; 7:00 p.m., ESPN+		at Buffalo	W 86–65	7–8 (1–2)	21 – Mirambeaux	4 – Tied	6 – Bultman	Alumni Arena (1,361); Buffalo, NY
January 13, 2024; 1:00 p.m., ESPN+		Eastern Michigan	W 71–54	8–8 (2–2)	23 – Elmer	8 – Bultman	6 – Bultman	Millett Hall (929); Oxford, OH
January 16, 2024; 7:00 p.m., ESPN+		Bowling Green	L 73–78	8–9 (2–3)	17 – Potter	8 – Hunter	4 – Hunter	Millett Hall (813); Oxford, OH
January 20, 2024; 2:00 p.m., ESPN+		at Ball State	W 87–80	9–9 (3–3)	16 – Mirambeaux	10 – Elmer	5 – Cooper	Worthen Arena (4,408); Muncie, IN
January 23, 2024; 3:30 p.m., ESPN+		at Central Michigan	L 55–71	9–10 (3–4)	16 – Hunter	7 – Bultman	4 – Ipsaro	McGuirk Arena (1,466); Mount Pleasant, MI
January 27, 2024; 1:00 p.m., ESPN+		Akron	W 70–68	10–10 (4–4)	19 – Mirambeaux	9 – Bultman	4 – Ipsaro	Millett Hall (1,408); Oxford, OH
January 30, 2024; 7:00 p.m., ESPN+		at Kent State	W 71–67	11–10 (5–4)	20 – Hunter	10 – Morris	3 – Bultman	MAC Center (2,114); Kent, OH
February 3, 2024; 2:00 p.m., ESPN+		at Ohio	L 69–78	11–11 (5–5)	16 – Mirambeaux	9 – Elmer	4 – Ipsaro	Convocation Center (9,018); Athens, OH
February 6, 2024; 7:00 p.m., ESPN+		Northern Illinois	L 59–62	11–12 (5–6)	10 – Potter	5 – Tied	5 – Bultman	Millett Hall (2,242); Oxford, OH
February 10, 2024*; 2:00 p.m., ESPN+		at Georgia State; MAC-SBC Challenge	L 53–73	11–13	19 – Hunter	8 – Morris	6 – Cooper	GSU Convocation Center (1,643); Atlanta, GA
February 17, 2024; 3:30 p.m., ESPN+		Ball State	W 80–59	12–13 (6–6)	18 – Elmer	8 – Hunter	5 – Cooper	Millett Hall (7,736); Oxford, OH
February 20, 2024; 7:00 p.m., ESPN+		at Western Michigan	L 58–77	12–14 (6–7)	19 – Mirambeaux	9 – Hunter	3 – Bultman	University Arena (1,436); Kalamazoo, MI
February 24, 2024; 3:30 p.m., ESPN+		Central Michigan	W 88–60	13–14 (7–7)	20 – Dean	6 – Morris	5 – Hunter	Millett Hall (6,732); Oxford, OH
February 27, 2024; 7:00 p.m., ESPN+		at Bowling Green	W 66–58	14–14 (8–7)	20 – Hunter	6 – Dean	5 – Ipsaro	Stroh Center (1,825); Bowling Green, OH
March 2, 2024; 1:00 p.m., ESPN+		at Eastern Michigan	W 52–37	15–14 (9–7)	11 – Mirabeaux	7 – Hunter	2 – Mirabeaux	George Gervin GameAbove Center (1,588); Ypsilanti, MI
March 5, 2024; 7:00 p.m., ESPN+		Toledo	L 63–97	15–15 (9–8)	18 – Elmer	6 – Tied	7 – Ipsaro	Millett Hall (1,847); Oxford, OH
March 8, 2024; 7:00 p.m., ESPN+		Ohio	L 59–72	15–16 (9–9)	13 – Mirambeaux	7 – Tied	3 – Tied	Millett Hall (3,506); Oxford, OH
MAC tournament
March 14, 2024; 4:30 p.,, ESPN+	(7)	vs. (2) Akron; Quarterfinals	L 63–75	15–17	17 – Mirambeaux	5 – Butlman	2 – Cooper	Rocket Mortgage FieldHouse; Cleveland, OH
*Non-conference game. ^{#}Rankings from AP Poll. (#) Tournament seedings in parentheses. All times are in Eastern Time.
