= 2024 MAC men's basketball tournament =

Basketball tournament

- Classification: Division I
- Season: 2023–24
- Teams: 8
- Site: Rocket Mortgage FieldHouse; Cleveland, Ohio
- Champions: Akron (5th title)
- Winning coach: John Groce (4th title)
- MVP: Enrique Freeman (Akron)
- Attendance: 23,611 (total); 7,955 (championship)
- Television: ESPN+, CBSSN, ESPN2
- MAC men's basketball tournaments

2023–24 Mid-American Conference men's basketball standings
	Conf.				Overall
Team	W		L	PCT	W		L	PCT
Toledo	14	–	4	.778	20	–	12	.625
Akron †	13	–	5	.722	24	–	11	.686
Ohio	13	–	5	.722	20	–	13	.606
Central Michigan	12	–	6	.667	18	–	14	.563
Bowling Green	10	–	8	.556	20	–	14	.588
Western Michigan	9	–	9	.500	12	–	20	.375
Miami (OH)	9	–	9	.500	15	–	17	.469
Kent State	8	–	10	.444	17	–	17	.500
Ball State	7	–	11	.389	15	–	16	.484
Eastern Michigan	6	–	12	.333	13	–	18	.419
Northern Illinois	5	–	13	.278	11	–	20	.355
Buffalo	2	–	16	.111	4	–	27	.129
† 2024 MAC tournament winner

The 2024 Mid-American Conference men's basketball tournament was the postseason men's basketball tournament for the Mid-American Conference (MAC) held March 14–16, 2024. The entire tournament was played at Rocket Mortgage FieldHouse in Cleveland, Ohio. Akron defeated Miami and Ohio in the first two rounds and then Kent State in the final Enrique Freeman was the MVP.

== Format ==
As with the 2021, 2022, and 2023 tournament only the top eight teams qualified. The winner of the tournament received the MAC's automatic bid to the 2024 NCAA tournament.

== Venue ==
The 2024 MAC tournament was held at Rocket Mortgage FieldHouse for the 25th consecutive season. The venue, located in downtown Cleveland at One Center Court, is the home of the Cleveland Cavaliers of the National Basketball Association (NBA) and has a seating capacity for basketball of 19,432.

== Seeds ==
Eight out of the 12 MAC teams qualified for the tournament. Teams were seeded by record within the conference, with a tiebreaker system to seed teams with identical conference records.

Seed	School	Conference record	Tiebreaker
1	Toledo	14–4	
2	Akron	13–5	1–1 vs Toledo
3	Ohio	13–5	0–2 vs Toledo
4	Central Michigan	12–6	
5	Bowling Green	10–8	
6	Western Michigan	9–9	2–0 vs Miami (OH)
7	Miami (OH)	9–9	0–2 vs Western Michigan
8	Kent State	8–10	
DNQ	Ball State	7–11	
DNQ	Eastern Michigan	6–12	
DNQ	Northern Illinois	5–13	
DNQ	Buffalo	2–16	

== Schedule ==
Session	Game	Time*	Matchup	Score	Television	Attendance
Quarterfinals – Thursday, March 14 – Rocket Mortgage FieldHouse, Cleveland, OH
1	1	11:00 am	No. 1 Toledo vs. No. 8 Kent State	59–67	ESPN+	7,854
1	2	30 mins after Game 1	No. 4 Central Michigan vs. No. 5 Bowling Green	56–66	ESPN+	7,854
1	3	30 mins after Game 2	No. 2 Akron vs. No. 7 Miami (OH)	75–63	ESPN+	7,854
1	4	30 mins after Game 3	No. 3 Ohio vs. No. 6 Western Michigan	82–55	ESPN+	7,854
Semifinals – Friday, March 15 – Rocket Mortgage FieldHouse, Cleveland, OH
2	5	5:00 pm	No. 8 Kent State vs. No. 5 Bowling Green	73–60	CBSSN	7,802
2	6	7:30 pm	No. 2 Akron vs. No. 3 Ohio	65–62	CBSSN	7,802
Championship – Saturday, March 16 – Rocket Mortgage FieldHouse, Cleveland, OH
3	7	7:30 pm	No. 8 Kent State vs. No. 2 Akron	61–62	ESPN2	7,955
*Game times in ET. ()-Rankings denote tournament seeding.						

== Bracket ==
Quarterfinals; Thursday, March 14, 2024
1	Toledo	59
8	Kent State	67
4	Central Michigan	56
5	Bowling Green	66
2	Akron	75
7	Miami (OH)	63
3	Ohio	82
6	Western Michigan	55

Semifinals; Friday, March 15, 2024
8	Kent State	73
5	Bowling Green	60
2	Akron	65
3	Ohio	62

Championship; Saturday, March 16, 2024
8	Kent State	61
2	Akron	62

== All-Tournament team ==
Tournament MVP – Enrique Freeman

Player	Team
Ali Ali	Akron
Enrique Freeman	Akron
VonCameron Davis	Kent State
Jalen Sullinger	Kent State
Jaylin Hunter	Ohio

== See also ==
- 2024 MAC women's basketball tournament
