= 2023–24 Mid-American Conference men's basketball season =

- League: NCAA Division I
- Sport: Basketball
- Teams: 12

Regular season
- League champions: Toledo
- Runners-up: Akron
- Season MVP: Enrique Freeman

Tournament
- Champions: Akron
- Runners-up: Kent State
- Finals MVP: Enrique Freeman

Mid-American men's basketball seasons
- ← 2022–23 2024–25 →

2023–24 Mid-American Conference men's basketball standings
	Conf.				Overall
Team	W		L	PCT	W		L	PCT
Toledo	14	–	4	.778	20	–	12	.625
Akron †	13	–	5	.722	24	–	11	.686
Ohio	13	–	5	.722	20	–	13	.606
Central Michigan	12	–	6	.667	18	–	14	.563
Bowling Green	10	–	8	.556	20	–	14	.588
Western Michigan	9	–	9	.500	12	–	20	.375
Miami (OH)	9	–	9	.500	15	–	17	.469
Kent State	8	–	10	.444	17	–	17	.500
Ball State	7	–	11	.389	15	–	16	.484
Eastern Michigan	6	–	12	.333	13	–	18	.419
Northern Illinois	5	–	13	.278	11	–	20	.355
Buffalo	2	–	16	.111	4	–	27	.129
† 2024 MAC tournament winner

The 2023–24 Mid-American Conference men's basketball season was the season for Mid-American Conference men's basketball teams. It began with practices in October 2023, followed by the start of the 2023–24 NCAA Division I men's basketball season in November. Conference play began in January 2024 and concluded in March 2024. The 2024 MAC tournament was held at Rocket Mortgage FieldHouse in Cleveland, Ohio for the 25th consecutive season.

Toledo won their fourth straight regular season championship with a 14–4 record in MAC play. Akron defeated Miami and Ohio in the MAC tournament and then Kent State in the final Enrique Freeman was the MVP.

== Head coaches ==
=== Coaching changes ===
==== Bowling Green ====
on March 5, 2023, Bowling Green fired head coach Michael Huger after three consecutive seasons posting win totals under 15 and with a 126–125 over eight seasons. On March 18, 2023, Bowling Green hired Todd Simon, who had previously been the head coach at Southern Utah.

==== Buffalo ====
On March 11, 2023, Buffalo fired Jim Whitesell after four seasons with a 70–49 record at the school. Buffalo hired Villanova associate head coach George Halcovage on March 30, 2023.

=== Coaches ===
Team	Head coach	Previous job	Years at school	Overall record	School record	MAC record	MAC titles	MAC Tournament titles	NCAA tournaments	NCAA Final Fours	NCAA Championships
Akron	John Groce	Illinois	7	296–201 (.596)	116–70 (.624)	67–43 (.609)	1	1	1	0	0
Ball State	Michael Lewis	UCLA (Asst.)	2	20–12 (.625)	20–12 (.625)	11–7 (.611)	0	0	0	0	0
Bowling Green	Todd Simon	Southern Utah	1	127–114 (.527)	0–0 (–)	0–0 (–)	0	0	0	0	0
Buffalo	George Halcovage	Villanova (Assoc. HC)	1	0–0 (–)	0–0 (–)	0–0 (–)	0	0	0	0	0
Central Michigan	Tony Barbee	Kentucky (Asst.)	3	148–171 (.464)	17–44 (.279)	11–25 (.306)	0	0	0	0	0
Eastern Michigan	Stan Heath	Lakeland Magic	3	227–251 (.475)	18–44 (.290)	10–28 (.263)	0	0	0	0	0
Kent State	Rob Senderoff	Kent State (Asst.)	13	247–147 (.627)	247–147 (.627)	130–84 (.607)	1	2	2	0	0
Miami	Travis Steele	Xavier	2	82–70 (.539)	12–20 (.375)	6–12 (.333)	0	0	0	0	0
Northern Illinois	Rashon Burno	Arizona State (Asst.)	3	22–40 (.355)	22–40 (.355)	15–23 (.395)	0	0	0	0	0
Ohio	Jeff Boals	Stony Brook	5	133–89 (.599)	78–47 (.624)	41–29 (.586)	0	1	1	0	0
Toledo	Tod Kowalczyk	Green Bay	14	394–281 (.584)	258–169 (.604)	142–89 (.615)	4	0	0	0	0
Western Michigan	Dwayne Stephens	Michigan State (Assoc. HC)	2	8–23 (.258)	8–23 (.258)	4–14 (.222)	0	0	0	0	0

Notes:

- Appearances, titles, etc. are from time with current school only.
- Years at school includes 2023–24 season.
- MAC records are from time at current school only.
- All records are through the beginning of the season.

Source -

== Preseason ==
The preseason coaches' poll and league awards were announced by the league office on November 1, 2023. Akron was named the MAC favorite over 2023 MAC tournament champion Kent State and Ohio.

=== Preseason men's basketball coaches poll ===
Men's Basketball Preseason Poll
Place	Team	Points	First place votes
1.	Akron	121	11
2.	Kent State	104	--
3.	Ohio	102	1
4.	Toledo	93	--
5.	Northern Illinois	82	--
T6.	Bowling Green	64	--
T6.	Miami	64	--
8.	Ball State	55	--
9.	Buffalo	38	--
10.	Western Michigan	33	--
11.	Eastern Michigan	22	--
12.	Central Michigan	14	--

MAC Tournament Champions: Akron (9), Kent State (1), Ohio (1), Toledo (1)

=== MAC Preseason All-Conference ===
Honor	Recipient
Preseason All-MAC First Team	Ali Ali, Guard, Akron, Sr.
Preseason All-MAC First Team	Enrique Freeman, Forward, Akron, Sr.
Preseason All-MAC First Team	Chris Payton, Forward, Kent State, Grad.
Preseason All-MAC First Team	Jaylin Hunter, Guard, Ohio, Sr.
Preseason All-MAC First Team	Dante Maddox Jr., Guard, Toledo, Jr.
Preseason All-MAC Second Team	Tyson Acuff, Guard, Eastern Michigan, Jr.
Preseason All-MAC Second Team	Jalen Sullinger, Guard, Kent State, Jr.
Preseason All-MAC Second Team	Anderson Mirambeaux, Center, Miami, Sr.
Preseason All-MAC Second Team	David Coit, Guard, Northern Illinois, Jr.
Preseason All-MAC Second Team	AJ Brown, Guard, Ohio, So.

== Regular season ==
=== Rankings ===
		Pre	Wk 2	Wk 3	Wk 4	Wk 5	Wk 6	Wk 7	Wk 8	Wk 9	Wk 10	Wk 11	Wk 12	Wk 13	Wk 14	Wk 15	Wk 16	Wk 17	Wk 18	Wk 19	Final
Akron	AP																				
Akron	C																				
Ball State	AP																				
Ball State	C																				
Bowling Green	AP																				
Bowling Green	C																				
Buffalo	AP																				
Buffalo	C																				
Central Michigan	AP																				
Central Michigan	C																				
Eastern Michigan	AP																				
Eastern Michigan	C																				
Kent State	AP																				
Kent State	C																				
Miami	AP																				
Miami	C																				
Northern Illinois	AP																				
Northern Illinois	C																				
Ohio	AP																				
Ohio	C																				
Toledo	AP																				
Toledo	C																				
Western Michigan	AP																				
Western Michigan	C																				

Legend
	Improvement in ranking
	Drop in ranking
	Not ranked previous week
	No change in ranking from previous week
RV	Received votes but were not ranked in Top 25 of poll
т	Tied with team above or below also with this symbol

Source - AP:

Coaches:

=== Conference matrix ===
	Akron	Ball State	Bowling Green	Buffalo	Central Michigan	Eastern Michigan	Kent State	Miami (OH)	Northern Illinois	Ohio	Toledo	Western Michigan
vs. Akron	—	0–1	0–1	0–2	0–1	1–1	0–2	1–0	0–2	1–1	1–1	1–1
vs. Ball State	1–0	—	2–0	0–1	1–1	1–1	1–1	2–0	0–2	1–0	1–0	1–1
vs. Bowling Green	1–0	0–2	—	0–1	2–0	1–1	1–0	1–1	0–1	1–1	1–1	0–2
vs. Buffalo	2–0	1–0	1–0	—	0–1	1–1	2–0	1–0	2–0	2–0	2–0	2–0
vs. Central Michigan	1–0	1–1	0–2	1–0	—	0–2	1–1	1–1	0–2	1–0	0–1	0–2
vs. Eastern Michigan	1–1	1–1	1–1	1–1	2–0	—	0–1	2–0	1–0	1–0	1–0	1–1
vs. Kent State	2–0	1–1	0–1	0–2	1–1	1–0	—	1–0	0–2	2–0	2–0	0–1
vs. Miami (OH)	0–1	0–2	1–1	0–1	1–1	0–2	0–1	—	1–0	2–0	2–0	2–0
vs. Northern Illinois	2–0	2–0	1–0	0–2	2–0	0–1	2–0	0–1	—	2–0	1–1	1–0
vs. Ohio	1–1	0–1	1–1	0–2	0–1	0–1	0–2	0–2	0–2	—	2–0	1–0
vs. Toledo	1–1	0–1	1–1	0–2	1–0	0–1	0–2	0–2	1–1	0–2	—	0–1
vs. Western Michigan	1–1	1–1	2–0	0–2	2–0	1–1	1–0	0–2	0–1	0–1	1–0	—
Total	13–5	7–11	10–8	2–16	12–6	6–12	8–10	9–9	5–13	13–5	14–4	9–9

== All-MAC awards ==
=== Mid-American men's basketball weekly awards ===
Week	Player(s) of the Week	School
Nov 13	Enrique Freeman	Akron
Nov 20	Enrique Freeman (2)	Akron
Nov 27	Marcus Hill	Bowling Green
Dec 4	Basheer Jihad; Elmore James	Ball State; Ohio
Dec 11	Enrique Freeman (3); Basheer Jihad (2)	Akron; Ball State
Dec 18	Tyler Cochran	Toledo
Dec 25	Enrique Freeman (4); Brian Taylor	Akron; Central Michigan
Jan 1	Seth Hubbard	Western Michigan
Jan 8	Enrique Freeman (5)	Akron
Jan 15	Enrique Freeman (6); Rashaun Agee	Akron; Bowling Green
Jan 22	Enrique Freeman (7); Marcus Hill (2)	Akron; Bowling Green
Jan 29	Basheer Jihad (3); Anthony Pritchard	Ball State; Central Michigan
Feb 5	Enrique Freeman (8)	Akron
Feb 12	Jaylin Hunter; Marcus Hill (3)	Ohio; Bowling Green
Feb 19	Tyson Acuff	Eastern Michigan
Feb 26	Marcus Hill (4)	Bowling Green
Mar 4	David Coit	Northern Illinois
Mar 11	Shareef Mitchell	Ohio

== Postseason ==
=== Mid–American Tournament ===
Akron defeated Miami and Ohio in the MAC tournament and then Kent State in the final Enrique Freeman was the MVP.

=== NCAA tournament ===
Akron was defeated by Creighton in the opening round.

=== National Invitation tournament ===
No MAC teams played in the NIT.

=== Postseason awards ===
Enrique Freeman of Akron was the unanimous selection for player of the year. Central Michigan's Tony Barbee was named coach of the year

1. Coach of the Year: Tony Barbee, Central Michigan
2. Player of the Year: Enrique Freeman, Senior, Forward, Akron
3. Freshman of the Year: Javan Simmons, Forward, Toledo
4. Co-Defensive Player of the Year: Anthony Pritchard, Junior, Guard, Central Michigan
5. Co-Defensive Player of the Year: Tyler Cochran, Junior, Guard, Toledo
6. Sixth Man of the Year: JaVaughn Hannah, Sophomore, Guard, Western Michigan

=== Honors ===
Honor	Recipient
Postseason All-MAC First Team	Ali Ali, Senior, Guard, Akron
Postseason All-MAC First Team	Enrique Freeman, Senior, Forward, Akron
Postseason All-MAC First Team	Marcus Hill, Junior, Guard, Bowling Green
Postseason All-MAC First Team	Anthony Pritchard, Junior, Guard, Central Michigan
Postseason All-MAC First Team	Ra’Heim Moss, Junior, Guard, Toledo
Postseason All-MAC Second Team	Basheer Jihad, Junior, Forward, Ball State
Postseason All-MAC Second Team	Rashaun Agee, Senior, Forward, Bowling Green
Postseason All-MAC Second Team	Jaylin Hunter, Senior, Guard, Ohio
Postseason All-MAC Second Team	Dante Maddox Jr., Junior, Guard, Toledo
Postseason All-MAC Second Team	Tyler Cochran, Junior, Guard, Toledo
Postseason All-MAC Third Team	Brian Taylor, Graduate Student, Guard, Central Michigan
Postseason All-MAC Third Team	Tyson Acuff, Junior, Guard, Eastern Michigan
Postseason All-MAC Third Team	Jalen Sullinger, Junior, Guard, Kent State
Postseason All-MAC Third Team	David Coit, Junior, Guard, Northern Illinois
Postseason All-MAC Third Team	AJ Clayton, Junior, Forward, Ohio
Postseason All-MAC Honorable Mention	Greg Tribble, Senior, Guard, Akron
Postseason All-MAC Honorable Mention	VonCameron Davis, R-Junior, Forward, Kent State
Postseason All-MAC Honorable Mention	Anderson Mirambeaux, Senior, Center, Miami
Postseason All-MAC Honorable Mention	Darweshi Hunter, Graduate Student, Guard, Miami
Postseason All-MAC Honorable Mention	B. Artis White, R-Junior, Guard, Western Michigan
All-MAC Freshman Team	Arne Osojnik, Guard, Eastern Michigan
All-MAC Freshman Team	Eian Elmer, Wing, Miami
All-MAC Freshman Team	Will Lovings-Watts, Guard, Northern Illinois
All-MAC Freshman Team	Javan Simmons, Forward, Toledo
All-MAC Freshman Team	Sonny Wilson, Guard, Toledo
All-MAC Defensive Team	Enrique Freeman, Senior, Forward, Akron
All-MAC Defensive Team	Greg Tribble, Senior, Guard, Akron
All-MAC Defensive Team	Anthony Pritchard, Junior, Guard, Central Michigan
All-MAC Defensive Team	Tyler Cochran, Junior, Guard, Toledo
All-MAC Defensive Team	Ra’Heim Moss, Junior, Guard, Toledo

== See also ==
- 2023–24 Mid-American Conference women's basketball season
