= 2023–24 Kent State Golden Flashes men's basketball team =

American college basketball season

2023–24 Kent State Golden Flashes men's basketball
- Conference: Mid-American Conference
- Record: 17–17 (8–10 MAC)
- Head coach: Rob Senderoff (13th season)
- Associate head coach: Julian Sullinger (6th season)
- Assistant coaches: Randal Holt (3rd season); Jon Fleming (2nd season)
- Home arena: MAC Center

2023–24 Mid-American Conference men's basketball standings
	Conf.				Overall
Team	W		L	PCT	W		L	PCT
Toledo	14	–	4	.778	20	–	12	.625
Akron †	13	–	5	.722	24	–	11	.686
Ohio	13	–	5	.722	20	–	13	.606
Central Michigan	12	–	6	.667	18	–	14	.563
Bowling Green	10	–	8	.556	20	–	14	.588
Western Michigan	9	–	9	.500	12	–	20	.375
Miami (OH)	9	–	9	.500	15	–	17	.469
Kent State	8	–	10	.444	17	–	17	.500
Ball State	7	–	11	.389	15	–	16	.484
Eastern Michigan	6	–	12	.333	13	–	18	.419
Northern Illinois	5	–	13	.278	11	–	20	.355
Buffalo	2	–	16	.111	4	–	27	.129
† 2024 MAC tournament winner

The 2023–24 Kent State Golden Flashes men's basketball team represented Kent State University in the 2023–24 NCAA Division I men's basketball season. The Golden Flashes, led by 13th-year head coach Rob Senderoff, played their home games at the Memorial Athletic and Convocation Center, also known as the MAC Center, in Kent, Ohio as members of the Mid-American Conference (MAC). They finished the season 15–16, 8–10 in MAC play, to finish in 8th place. They defeated Toledo and Bowling Green in the MAC tournament, before falling to Akron in the championship game to conclude the season with a 17–17 overall record.

== Previous season ==
The Golden Flashes finished the 2022–23 season 28–7 overall, 15–3 in MAC play, to finish in second place in the conference. As the second seed they defeated Northern Illinois, Akron and top-seeded Toledo to win the MAC tournament. Kent State was placed as the 13th seed in the Midwest Regional where they lost to Indiana in the first round of the NCAA tournament.

== Offseason ==
=== Departures ===
Departures
Name	Pos.	Height	Weight	Year	Hometown	Notes
Malique Jacobs	G	6' 3"	194	RS-Senior	Wilmington, NC	Exhausted eligibility
Sincere Carry	G	6' 1"	185	RS-Senior	Solon, OH	Declared for NBA draft
Robert Carpenter	F	6' 7"	210	RS-Junior	Detroit, MI	Transferred to New Mexico State
London Maiden	C	6' 9"	258	Freshman	Cleveland, OH	Entered transfer portal
Miryne Thomas	F	6' 8"	215	RS-Senior	Cleveland, OH	Exhausted eligibility
Akeem Odusipe	F	6' 8"	225	RS-Sophomore	Lagos, Nigeria	

=== Incoming transfers ===
Transfers
Name	Pos.	Height	Weight	Year	Hometown	Previous school
Reggie Bass	G	6' 3"	185	Sophomore	Muncie, IN	Central Michigan
Tyem Freeman	G	6' 5"	205	Graduate student	Springfield, MO	UCF
Jake Snyder	G	6' 1"	175	Graduate student	Stow, OH	Baldwin Wallace

=== Recruiting class ===
College recruiting information
Name	Hometown	School	Height	Weight	Commit date
LA Hayes; G	Akron, OH		6 ft 5 in (1.96 m)	181 lb (82 kg)	
LA Hayes; G	Recruit ratings: Scout: Rivals: 247Sports: (NR)				
Donovan Hunter; F	Cleveland, OH		6 ft 8 in (2.03 m)	197 lb (89 kg)	
Donovan Hunter; F	Recruit ratings: Scout: Rivals: 247Sports: (NR)				
Overall recruit ranking:
Note: In many cases, Scout, Rivals, 247Sports, On3, and ESPN may conflict in their listings of height and weight.; In these cases, the average was taken. ESPN grades are on a 100-point scale.; Sources: "2023 Team Ranking". Rivals.

== Roster ==
2023–24 Kent State Golden Flashes men's basketball team
Players
Coaches

Pos.	#	Name	Height	Weight	Year	Hometown
G	0	Julius Rollins	6 ft 7 in (2.01 m)	199 lb (90 kg)	RS So	Chicago, IL
F	1	VonCameron Davis	6 ft 5 in (1.96 m)	229 lb (104 kg)	RS Jr	Columbus, OH
G	2	Reggie Bass	6 ft 3 in (1.91 m)	185 lb (84 kg)		Muncie, IN
F	4	Chris Jr. Payton	6 ft 7 in (2.01 m)	226 lb (103 kg)	GS	Bloomington, IL
G	5	Brendon Moss	6 ft 5 in (1.96 m)	190 lb (86 kg)	So	Rockford, IL
G	11	Giovanni Santiago	6 ft 1 in (1.85 m)	170 lb (77 kg)	RS Sr	Bayamón, Puerto Rico
G	13	Jalen Sullinger	5 ft 10 in (1.78 m)	172 lb (78 kg)	Jr	Columbus, OH
F	14	Magnus Entenmann	6 ft 8 in (2.03 m)	225 lb (102 kg)	So	Columbus, OH
G	15	Mike Bekelja	6 ft 0 in (1.83 m)	184 lb (83 kg)	Jr	Solon, OH
G	22	Tyem Freeman	6 ft 5 in (1.96 m)	206 lb (93 kg)	GS	Springfield, MO
F	23	Delrecco Gillespie	6 ft 8 in (2.03 m)	216 lb (98 kg)	So	Benton Harbor, MI
G	25	LA Hayes	6 ft 5 in (1.96 m)	181 lb (82 kg)	Fr	Akron, OH
G	25	Jake Snyder	6 ft 1 in (1.85 m)	176 lb (80 kg)	GS	Stow, OH
C	42	Cli'Ron Hornbeak	6 ft 9 in (2.06 m)	238 lb (108 kg)	Jr	Toledo, OH
F	55	Donovan Hunter	6 ft 8 in (2.03 m)	197 lb (89 kg)	Fr	Cleveland, OH

Head coach

- Rob Senderoff (Albany/Miami (FL))

Assistant coach(es)

- Julian Sullinger (Kent State)
- Randal Holt (Kent State)
- Jon Fleming (Kent State)

Legend

- (C) Team captain
- (S) Suspended
- (I) Ineligible
- (W) Walk-on
- Injured
- Current redshirt

Roster
Last update: September 29, 2023

== Schedule and results ==
Date time, TV	Rank^{#}	Opponent^{#}	Result	Record	High points	High rebounds	High assists	Site (attendance) city, state
Non-conference regular season
November 6, 2023*; 7:00 p.m., ESPN+		Malone	W 79–58	1–0	15 – Santiago	6 – tied	3 – Payton	MAC Center (2,954); Kent, OH
November 9, 2023*; 7:00 p.m., ESPN+		James Madison; MAC–SBC Challenge	L 108–113 ^{2OT}	1–1	30 – Sullinger	17 – Payton	11 – Santiago	MAC Center (3,126); Kent, OH
November 11, 2023*; 7:00 p.m., ESPN+		Fresno State	W 79–69	2–1	17 – Sullinger	7 – Payton	6 – Santiago	MAC Center (2,655); Kent, OH
November 17, 2023*; 7:45 p.m., ESPN+		vs. Hampton; Paradise Jam quarterfinals	W 100–62	3–1	20 – Payton	8 – Payton	5 – Santiago	UVI Sports & Fitness Center; St. Thomas, Virgin Islands
November 19, 2023*; 8:00 p.m., ESPN+		vs. Missouri State; Paradise Jam semifinals	L 52–56	3–2	11 – Hornbeak	8 – Davis	3 – Santiago	UVI Sports & Fitness Center (924); St. Thomas, Virgin Islands
November 20, 2023*; 5:45 p.m., ESPN+		vs. Fordham; Paradise Jam 3rd-place game	W 79–72	4–2	23 – Payton	9 – Payton	4 – Bass	UVI Sports & Fitness Center; St. Thomas, Virgin Islands
November 26, 2023*; 5:30 p.m., ESPN+		Charleston	L 78–84	4–3	23 – Sullinger	7 – Sullinger	5 – Santiago	MAC Center (1,813); Kent, OH
November 30, 2023*; 7:00 p.m.		Shawnee State	W 103–61	5–3	19 – Moss	7 – Hornbeak	4 – Hayes	MAC Center (2,225); Kent, OH
December 5, 2023*; 9:15 p.m.		at South Dakota State	W 82–73	6–3	19 – Santiago	11 – Payton	4 – Santiago	Frost Arena (2,453); Brookings, SD
December 9, 2023*; 2:00 p.m., ESPN+		Cleveland State	W 83–77	7–3	18 – Payton	20 – Payton	3 – tied	MAC Center (3,124); Kent, OH
December 21, 2023*; 9:00 p.m., Pac-12 Network		at Oregon	L 70–84	7–4	16 – Freeman	7 – tied	5 – Sullinger	Matthew Knight Arena (5,056); Eugene, OR
December 29, 2023*; 8:00 p.m., ESPN+		at Saint Mary's	L 46–66	7–5	18 – Payton	6 – Payton	2 – Santiago	University Credit Union Pavilion (3,380); Moraga, CA
MAC regular season
January 2, 2024; 7:00 p.m., ESPN+		Ball State	W 82–69	8–5 (1–0)	20 – Payton	6 – tied	5 – Santiago	MAC Center (1,796); Kent, OH
January 6, 2024; 3:30 p.m., ESPN+		at Eastern Michigan	L 69–71 ^{OT}	8–6 (1–1)	15 – Payton	8 – Payton	8 – Santiago	George Gervin GameAbove Center (3,058); Ypsilanti, MI
January 9, 2024; 7:00 p.m., CBSSN		Toledo	L 75–89	8–7 (1–2)	21 – Sullinger	6 – Payton	5 – Santiago	MAC Center (1,786); Kent, OH
January 13, 2024; 2:00 p.m., ESPN+		at Central Michigan	L 62–77	8–8 (1–3)	20 – Davis	7 – Payton	5 – Sullinger	McGuirk Arena (1,667); Mount Pleasant, MI
January 16, 2024; 8:00 p.m., ESPN+		at Northern Illinois	W 83–76	9–8 (2–3)	23 – tied	5 – Payton	3 – tied	Convocation Center (809); DeKalb, IL
January 19, 2024; 7:00 p.m., ESPNU		Akron	L 71–77	9–9 (2–4)	16 – Santiago	8 – Payton	4 – Sullinger	MAC Center (6,330); Kent, OH
January 23, 2024; 7:00 p.m., ESPN+		at Bowling Green	W 90–84 ^{OT}	10–9 (3–4)	30 – Sullinger	12 – Davis	5 – Santiago	Stroh Center (2,099); Bowling Green, OH
January 26, 2024; 6:30 p.m., CBSSN		Ohio	L 64–71	10–10 (3–5)	16 – Freeman	9 – Freeman	4 – tied	MAC Center (3,557); Kent, OH
January 30, 2024; 7:00 p.m., ESPN+		Miami (OH)	L 67–71	10–11 (3–6)	16 – Sullinger	7 – Payton	3 – tied	MAC Center (2,114); Kent, OH
February 2, 2024; 6:30 p.m., CBSSN		at Buffalo	W 83–52	11–11 (4–6)	17 – tied	7 – tied	10 – Santiago	Alumni Arena (2,042); Buffalo, NY
February 6, 2024; 7:00 p.m., ESPN+		Western Michigan	W 63–61	12–11 (5–6)	19 – Davis	6 – Payton	3 – Santiago	MAC Center (2,564); Kent, OH
February 10, 2024*; 4:30 p.m., ESPN+		at Troy; MAC–SBC Challenge	L 68–78	12–12	21 – Bass	7 – Payton	6 – Bass	Trojan Arena (3,912); Troy, AL
February 17, 2024; 2:00 p.m., ESPN+		Northern Illinois	W 85–47	13–12 (6–6)	17 – tied	8 – Hornbeak	7 – Sullinger	MAC Center (2,894); Kent, OH
February 20, 2024; 7:00 p.m., ESPN+		at Ohio	L 57–63	13–13 (6–7)	14 – tied	6 – Payton	4 – Santiago	Convocation Center (4,132); Athens, OH
February 23, 2024; 6:00 p.m., ESPN+		at Akron	L 70–83	13–14 (6–8)	20 – Sullinger	10 – Payton	4 – tied	James A. Rhodes Arena (5,160); Akron, OH
February 27, 2024; 7:00 p.m., ESPN+		Buffalo	W 76–64	14–14 (7–8)	30 – Sullinger	7 – Payton	7 – Santiago	MAC Center (2,928); Kent, OH
March 2, 2024; 3:30 p.m., ESPN+		Central Michigan	W 79–73 ^{OT}	15–14 (8–8)	21 – Santiago	9 – Hornbeak	5 – Davis	MAC Center (5,310); Kent, OH
March 5, 2024; 7:00 p.m., ESPN+		at Ball State	L 69–76	15–15 (8–9)	17 – Bass	7 – Hornbeak	6 – Santiago	Worthen Arena (3,412); Muncie, IN
March 8, 2024; 7:00 p.m., ESPN+		at Toledo	L 71–86	15–16 (8–10)	20 – Davis	9 – Hornbeak	8 – Davis	Savage Arena (6,520); Toledo, OH
MAC tournament
March 14, 2024; 11:00 a.m., ESPN+	(8)	vs. (1) Toledo; Quarterfinals	W 67–59	16–16	26 – Davis	12 – Davis	3 – Davis	Rocket Mortgage FieldHouse (7,854); Cleveland, OH
March 15, 2024; 5:00 p.m., CBSSN	(8)	vs. (5) Bowling Green; Semifinals	W 73–60	17–16	22 – Sullinger	9 – Hornbeak	6 – Santiago	Rocket Mortgage FieldHouse (7,802); Cleveland, OH
March 16, 2024; 7:30 p.m., ESPN2	(8)	vs. (2) Akron; Championship	L 61–62	17–17	21 – Davis	8 – Sullinger	3 – Santiago	Rocket Mortgage FieldHouse (7,955); Cleveland, OH
*Non-conference game. ^{#}Rankings from AP poll. (#) Tournament seedings in parentheses. All times are in Eastern.
