= 2023–24 Western Michigan Broncos men's basketball team =

American college basketball season

2023–24 Western Michigan Broncos men's basketball
- Conference: Mid-American Conference
- Record: 12–20 (9–9 MAC)
- Head coach: Dwayne Stephens (2nd season)
- Assistant coaches: Jeff Rutter; Chris Fowler; Manny Dosanjh
- Home arena: University Arena

2023–24 Mid-American Conference men's basketball standings
	Conf.				Overall
Team	W		L	PCT	W		L	PCT
Toledo	14	–	4	.778	20	–	12	.625
Akron †	13	–	5	.722	24	–	11	.686
Ohio	13	–	5	.722	20	–	13	.606
Central Michigan	12	–	6	.667	18	–	14	.563
Bowling Green	10	–	8	.556	20	–	14	.588
Western Michigan	9	–	9	.500	12	–	20	.375
Miami (OH)	9	–	9	.500	15	–	17	.469
Kent State	8	–	10	.444	17	–	17	.500
Ball State	7	–	11	.389	15	–	16	.484
Eastern Michigan	6	–	12	.333	13	–	18	.419
Northern Illinois	5	–	13	.278	11	–	20	.355
Buffalo	2	–	16	.111	4	–	27	.129
† 2024 MAC tournament winner

The 2023–24 Western Michigan Broncos men's basketball team represented Western Michigan University in the 2023–24 NCAA Division I men's basketball season. The Broncos, led by second-year head coach Dwayne Stephens, played their home games at University Arena in Kalamazoo, Michigan as members of the Mid-American Conference (MAC). They finished the season 12–20, 9–9 in MAC play, to finish in a tie for sixth place. They lost to Ohio in the first round of the MAC tournament.

== Previous season ==
The Broncos finished the 2022–23 season 8–23 with a 4–14 MAC record. They finished last in the MAC and failed to qualify for the MAC tournament.

== Offseason ==
=== Departures ===
Departures
Name	Number	Pos.	Height	Weight	Year	Hometown	Reason for departure
Markeese Hastings	0	F	6' 7"	195	RS-Junior	Grand Rapids, MI	Transferred to Robert Morris
Shemani Fuller	1	F	6' 8"	205	RS-Freshman	The Bronx, NY	Transferred to Clark Atlanta
Tray Maddox Jr.	2	G	6' 4"	200	RS-Senior	Novi, MI	Exhausted eligibility
Lamar Norman Jr.	11	G	6' 1"	175	Senior	Grand Rapids, MI	Exhausted eligibility
Gus Etchison	21	F	5' 11"	145	Sophomore	Arcadia, IN	Transferred to Marian University
Tafari Simms	23	F	6' 6"	212	Senior	Hamilton, ON	Exhausted eligibility
Elisha Warren	24	G	6' 2"	175	Freshman	Woodhaven, MI	Transferred to Ranger College

=== Incoming transfers ===
Incoming transfers
Name	Number	Pos.	Height	Weight	Year	Hometown	Previous school
Anthony Crump	0	G	5' 8"	215	RS-Senior	Inkster, MI	Northern Illinois
Markhi Strickland	15	G/F	6' 6"	210	Junior	Miami, FL	Victoria College
Javonte Brown	31	C	7' 0"	255	Junior	Toronto, ON	Texas A&M

=== Recruiting class ===
College recruiting information
Name	Hometown	School	Height	Weight	Commit date
Josh Thomas; G/F	Lincolnshire, IL	Evanston Township	6 ft 6 in (1.98 m)	185 lb (84 kg)	
Josh Thomas; G/F	Recruit ratings: No ratings found				
Michael Sulaka; F	Macomb, MI	De La Salle	6 ft 9 in (2.06 m)	215 lb (98 kg)	
Michael Sulaka; F	Recruit ratings: No ratings found				
Overall recruit ranking:
Note: In many cases, Scout, Rivals, 247Sports, On3, and ESPN may conflict in their listings of height and weight.; In these cases, the average was taken. ESPN grades are on a 100-point scale.; Sources: "2023 Team Ranking". Rivals.

== Roster ==
2023–24 Western Michigan Broncos men's basketball team
Players
Coaches

Pos.	#	Name	Height	Weight	Year	Previous school	Hometown
G	0	Anthony Crump	6 ft 8 in (2.03 m)	215 lb (98 kg)	GS	Northern Illinois	Inkster, MI
G	1	Brandon Muntu	6 ft 4 in (1.93 m)	190 lb (86 kg)	Jr	Triton College	Calgary, AB
G	2	Jefferson De La Cruz Monegro	6 ft 4 in (1.93 m)	185 lb (84 kg)	So	Orangeville Prep	LaSalle, QC
G	3	B. Artis White	5 ft 10 in (1.78 m)	155 lb (70 kg)	RS Jr	Canton High School	Canton, MI
G	4	Javaughn Hannah	6 ft 4 in (1.93 m)	205 lb (93 kg)	So	Orchard Lake St. Mary’s	Mount Clemens, MI
F	10	Max Burton	6 ft 9 in (2.06 m)	230 lb (104 kg)	RS Fr	Williamston	Williamston, MI
G	12	Seth Hubbard	6 ft 4 in (1.93 m)	175 lb (79 kg)	So	Huntington Prep	Jonesboro, GA
G/F	15	Markhi Strickland	6 ft 6 in (1.98 m)	210 lb (95 kg)	Jr	Victoria College	Miami, FL
F	20	Owen Lobsinger	6 ft 9 in (2.06 m)	225 lb (102 kg)	Jr	Powers Catholic High School	Flint, MI
C	22	Titus Wright	6 ft 8 in (2.03 m)	220 lb (100 kg)	Sr	Thomasville High School	Thomasville, GA
G/F	23	Josh Thomas	6 ft 6 in (1.98 m)	185 lb (84 kg)	Fr	Evanston Township	Lincolnshire, IL
F	24	Michael Sulaka	6 ft 9 in (2.06 m)	215 lb (98 kg)	Fr	De La Salle	Macomb, MI
F	31	Javonte Brown	7 ft 0 in (2.13 m)	255 lb (116 kg)	RS So	Texas A&M	Toronto, ON
F	33	Jack Stefanski	6 ft 6 in (1.98 m)	205 lb (93 kg)	RS So	Frankfort High School	Frankfort, MI

Head coach

- Dwayne Stephens (Michigan State)

Assistant coach(es)

- Jeff Rutter (Winona State)
- Chris Fowler (Central Michigan)
- Manny Dosanjh (Oral Roberts)

Legend

- (C) Team captain
- (S) Suspended
- (I) Ineligible
- (W) Walk-on
- Injured
- Current redshirt

Roster
Last update: September 29, 2023

== Schedule and results ==
Date time, TV	Rank^{#}	Opponent^{#}	Result	Record	High points	High rebounds	High assists	Site (attendance) city, state
Exhibition
November 1, 2023*; 7:00 p.m.		Kalamazoo	W 94–63	–	–	–	–	University Arena; Kalamazoo, MI
Non-conference regular season
November 6, 2023*; 7:00 p.m., ESPN+		North Dakota State	L 76–80 ^{OT}	0–1	20 – White	11 – Wright	4 – White	University Arena (1,364); Kalamazoo, MI
November 11, 2023*; 1:00 p.m., ESPN+		Georgia State; MAC–SBC Challenge	L 70–77	0–2	12 – tied	7 – Strickland	2 – tied	University Arena (1,313); Kalamazoo, MI
November 14, 2023*; 8:00 p.m., BTN+		at Northwestern	L 59–63	0–3	17 – Hubbard	9 – Crump	10 – De La Cruz Monegro	Welsh–Ryan Arena (4,143); Evanston, IL
November 19, 2023*; 4:00 p.m., BTN		at Ohio State; Emerald Coast Classic campus-site game	L 56–73	0–4	24 – Hubbard	11 – Lobsinger	3 – Muntu	Value City Arena (9,505); Columbus, OH
November 24, 2023*; 2:30 p.m., FloHoops		vs. Southeastern Louisiana; Emerald Coast Classic consolation game	W 68–67	1–4	18 – Hubbard	8 – 2 tied	4 – Wright	The Arena at NFSC (450); Niceville, FL
November 25, 2023*; 1:30 p.m., FloHoops		vs. Mercer; Emerald Coast Classic 5th-place game	W 72–66	2–4	25 – Lobsinger	8 – Lobsinger	6 – De La Cruz Monegro	The Arena at NFSC (150); Niceville, FL
December 1, 2023*; 5:00 p.m., ESPN+		St. Thomas	L 51–66	2–5	12 – Crump	7 – Lobsinger	2 – Hubbard	University Arena (1,411); Kalamazoo, MI
December 5, 2023*; 7:00 p.m., ACCNX		at Notre Dame	L 65–86	2–6	14 – Wright	6 – Wright	4 – White	Joyce Center (4,883); South Bend, IN
December 9, 2023*; 1:00 p.m., ESPN+		Youngstown State	L 68–72	2–7	18 – Hannah	9 – Lobsinger	6 – White	University Arena (1,598); Kalamazoo, MI
December 16, 2023*; 2:00 p.m., ESPN+		at UIC	L 68–89	2–8	16 – Hubbard	11 – Brown	3 – Wright	Credit Union 1 Arena (1,329); Chicago, IL
December 21, 2023*; 6:00 p.m., ESPN3/ESPN+		at Cleveland State	L 77–90	2–9	23 – Hubbard	11 – Lobsinger	6 – De La Cruz Monegro	Wolstein Center (1,473); Cleveland, OH
December 29, 2023*; 4:00 p.m.		Aquinas	W 127–71	3–9	27 – Hubbard	6 – White	8 – White	University Arena (1,581); Kalamazoo, MI
MAC regular season
January 2, 2024; 7:00 p.m., ESPN3/ESPN+		at Miami (OH)	W 83–74	4–9 (1–0)	17 – Hubbard	9 – Crump	5 – White	Millett Hall (1,005); Oxford, OH
January 6, 2024; 2:00 p.m., ESPN3/ESPN+		at Buffalo	W 82–77	5–9 (2–0)	19 – Hubbard	10 – Crump	6 – White	Alumni Arena (2,260); Buffalo, NY
January 9, 2024; 7:00 p.m., ESPN3/ESPN+		Northern Illinois	W 95–90 ^{OT}	6–9 (3–0)	25 – White	10 – Lobsinger	3 – 2 tied	University Arena (1,339); Kalamazoo, MI
January 13, 2024; 12:00 p.m., ESPN3/ESPN+		Ohio	W 81–79	7–9 (4–0)	15 – Hubbard	9 – Crump	5 – White	University Arena (1,650); Kalamazoo, MI
January 16, 2024; 7:00 p.m., ESPN3/ESPN+		at Akron	L 66–77	7–10 (4–1)	17 – De La Cruz Monegro	7 – Brown	3 – De La Cruz Monegro	James A. Rhodes Arena (2,061); Akron, OH
January 20, 2024; 2:00 p.m., ESPN3/ESPN+		at Bowling Green	L 79–84	7–11 (4–2)	25 – Lobsinger	7 – Lobsinger	5 – White	Stroh Center (2,232); Bowling Green, OH
January 23, 2024; 7:00 p.m., ESPN3/ESPN+		Eastern Michigan	W 73–56	8–11 (5–2)	15 – Hubbard	11 – Lobsinger	4 – De La Cruz Monegro	University Arena (2,208); Kalamazoo, MI
January 27, 2024; 1:00 p.m., ESPN3/ESPN+		Central Michigan	L 55–62	8–12 (5–3)	16 – Hubbard	12 – Lobsinger	9 – De La Cruz Monegro	University Arena (3,110); Kalamazoo, MI
January 30, 2024; 7:00 p.m., ESPN3/ESPN+		at Toledo	L 63–88	8–13 (5–4)	12 – Wright	8 – Crump	6 – De La Cruz Monegro	Savage Arena (3,915); Toledo, OH
February 3, 2024; 1:00 p.m., ESPN3/ESPN+		Ball State	L 67–77	8–14 (5–5)	21 – De La Cruz Monegro	11 – Crump	4 – De La Cruz Monegro	University Arena (1,729); Kalamazoo, MI
February 6, 2024; 7:00 p.m., ESPN3/ESPN+		at Kent State	L 61–63	8–15 (5–6)	14 – Brown	12 – Crump	5 – De La Cruz Monegro	MAC Center (2,564); Kent, OH
February 10, 2024*; 3:00 p.m., ESPN+		at Southern Miss; MAC–SBC Challenge	L 54–86	8–16	17 – Hubbard	8 – Crump	5 – De La Cruz Monegro	Reed Green Coliseum (3,842); Hattiesburg, MS
February 17, 2024; 7:00 p.m., ESPN3/ESPN+		at Central Michigan	L 42–69	8–17 (5–7)	12 – White	10 – Lobsinger	3 – Lobsinger	McGuirk Arena (5,032); Mount Pleasant, MI
February 20, 2024; 7:00 p.m., ESPN3/ESPN+		Miami (OH)	W 77–58	9–17 (6–7)	19 – Hubbard	7 – tied	5 – De La Cruz Monegro	University Arena (1,436); Kalamazoo, MI
February 24, 2024; 2:30 p.m., ESPN3/ESPN+		Buffalo	W 91–72	10–17 (7–7)	18 – tied	7 – tied	8 – White	University Arena (1,928); Kalamazoo, MI
February 27, 2024; 7:00 p.m., ESPN3/ESPN+		at Eastern Michigan	L 67–70	10–18 (7–8)	18 – Hannah	8 – Hubbard	5 – Hubbard	George Gervin GameAbove Center (1,612); Ypsilanti, MI
March 2, 2024; 2:00 p.m., ESPN3/ESPN+		at Ball State	W 78–76 ^{OT}	11–18 (8–8)	17 – Hannah	9 – Lobsinger	4 – White	Worthen Arena (5,223); Muncie, IN
March 5, 2024; 7:00 p.m., ESPN3/ESPN+		Bowling Green	L 65–73	11–19 (8–9)	12 – Hubbard	10 – Crump	3 – De La Cruz Monegro	University Arena (1,243); Kalamazoo, MI
March 8, 2024; 7:00 p.m., ESPN3/ESPN+		Akron	W 90–84	12–19 (9–9)	23 – White	9 – Lobsinger	4 – Hannah	University Arena (1,636); Kalamazoo, MI
MAC tournament
March 14, 2024; 6:30 p.m., ESPN+	(6)	vs. (3) Ohio; Quarterfinals	L 55–82	12–20	12 – White	8 – Lobsinger	2 – tied	Rocket Mortgage FieldHouse (7,854); Cleveland, OH
*Non-conference game. ^{#}Rankings from AP poll. (#) Tournament seedings in parentheses. All times are in Eastern.
