= 2023–24 Buffalo Bulls men's basketball team =

American college basketball season

2023–24 Buffalo Bulls men's basketball
- Conference: Mid-American Conference
- Record: 4–27 (2–16 MAC)
- Head coach: George Halcovage III (1st season)
- Assistant coaches: Hamlet Tibbs (1st season); Jake Presutti (1st season); Calvin Cage (1st season)
- Home arena: Alumni Arena

2023–24 Mid-American Conference men's basketball standings
	Conf.				Overall
Team	W		L	PCT	W		L	PCT
Toledo	14	–	4	.778	20	–	12	.625
Akron †	13	–	5	.722	24	–	11	.686
Ohio	13	–	5	.722	20	–	13	.606
Central Michigan	12	–	6	.667	18	–	14	.563
Bowling Green	10	–	8	.556	20	–	14	.588
Western Michigan	9	–	9	.500	12	–	20	.375
Miami (OH)	9	–	9	.500	15	–	17	.469
Kent State	8	–	10	.444	17	–	17	.500
Ball State	7	–	11	.389	15	–	16	.484
Eastern Michigan	6	–	12	.333	13	–	18	.419
Northern Illinois	5	–	13	.278	11	–	20	.355
Buffalo	2	–	16	.111	4	–	27	.129
† 2024 MAC tournament winner

The 2023–24 Buffalo Bulls men's basketball team represented the University at Buffalo in the 2023–24 NCAA Division I men's basketball season. The Bulls, led by first-year head coach George Halcovage III, played their home games at Alumni Arena in Amherst, New York as members of the Mid-American Conference. They finished the season 4–27, 2–16 in MAC play, to finish in last place. They failed to qualify for the MAC tournament.

In January 2026, it was alleged in a federal indictment filed in the United States District Court for the Eastern District of Pennsylvania that freshman Shawn Fulcher, senior Isaiah Adams and an unnamed third Buffalo player conspired to shave points during the team's games on February 24 and 27, 2024 and March 5, 2024. Buffalo lost all three games. Gamblers allegedly paid the players $54,000 for their roles.

== Previous season ==
The Bulls finished the season 15–17, 9–9 in MAC play, to finish in a tie for sixth place. As the No. 6 seed in the MAC tournament they lost to Akron in the quarterfinals. On March 11, 2023, the school fired head coach Jim Whitesell. On March 30, the school named longtime Villanova assistant coach George Halcovage the team's new head coach.

== Offseason ==
=== Departures ===
Departures
Name	Number	Pos.	Height	Weight	Year	Hometown	Reason
LaQuill Hardnett	1	F	6'8"	205	Senior	Philadelphia, PA	Transferred to Arkansas State
Kidtrell Blocker	2	G	6'5"	164	Sophomore	Rochester, NY	Transferred to IUPUI
Curtis Jones	3	G	6'5"	180	Sophomore	Minneapolis, MN	Transferred to Iowa State
Armoni Foster	4	G	6'4"	180	Graduate student	Meadville, PA	Exhausted eligibility
Devin Ceaser	10	G	6'1"	172	Freshman	Waldorf, MD	Transferred to Old Dominion
Kuluel Mading	11	F	6'9"	208	Sophomore	High Point, NC	Transferred to Norfolk State
Yadiz Powell	13	G	6'4"	195	Junior	Philadelphia, PA	Transferred to UTEP
Isaac Jack	31	C	6'1"	251	Freshman	Port Alberni, BC	Transferred to Dayton
Jaden Slaughter	33	G	6'5"	202	Freshman	Buffalo, NY	Transferred to Coahoma CC

=== Incoming transfers ===
Incoming transfers
Name	Number	Pos.	Height	Weight	Year	Hometown	Reason
James Graham	12	G/F	6'7"	208	Junior	Milwaukee, WI	Transferred from Missouri State

=== Recruiting class ===
College recruiting information
Name	Hometown	School	Height	Weight	Commit date
Ryan Sabol; G	Washington, D.C.	Gonzaga College High School	6 ft 2 in (1.88 m)	195 lb (88 kg)	
Ryan Sabol; G	Recruit ratings: Scout: Rivals: 247Sports: (NR)				
Anquan Boldin Jr. G	Delray Beach, FL	IMG Academy	6 ft 3 in (1.91 m)	194 lb (88 kg)	
Anquan Boldin Jr. G	Recruit ratings: Scout: Rivals: 247Sports: (NR)				
Shawn Fulcher; G	Brooklyn, NY	Ellsworth CC	6 ft 0 in (1.83 m)	170 lb (77 kg)	
Shawn Fulcher; G	Recruit ratings: Scout: Rivals: 247Sports: (NR)				
Bryson Wilson; F	Washington, D.C.	St. Stephen's & St. Agnes School	6 ft 5 in (1.96 m)	210 lb (95 kg)	
Bryson Wilson; F	Recruit ratings: Scout: Rivals: 247Sports: (78)				
Lloyd McVeigh; F	Cabarita Beach, Australia		6 ft 6 in (1.98 m)	N/A	
Lloyd McVeigh; F	Recruit ratings: Scout: Rivals: 247Sports: (NR)				
Diovion Famakinde; G	Woodstock, CT	Hargrave Military Academy	6 ft 3 in (1.91 m)	224 lb (102 kg)	
Diovion Famakinde; G	Recruit ratings: Scout: Rivals: 247Sports: (77)				
Overall recruit ranking:
Note: In many cases, Scout, Rivals, 247Sports, On3, and ESPN may conflict in their listings of height and weight.; In these cases, the average was taken. ESPN grades are on a 100-point scale.; Sources: "2023 Team Ranking". Rivals.

== Roster ==
2023–24 Buffalo Bulls men's basketball team
Players
Coaches

Pos.	#	Name	Height	Weight	Year	Previous school	Hometown
G	0	Kanye Jones	6 ft 5 in (1.96 m)	190 lb (86 kg)	So	Boston College	Orlando, FL
F	1	Sy Chatman	6 ft 8 in (2.03 m)	227 lb (103 kg)		Illinois State	Minneapolis, MN
G	2	Ryan Sabol	6 ft 2 in (1.88 m)	195 lb (88 kg)	Fr	Gonzaga College High School	Washington, D.C.
F	3	Isaiah Adams	6 ft 6 in (1.98 m)	210 lb (95 kg)	Sr	UCF	Jacksonville, FL
G	4	Anquan Boldin Jr.	6 ft 3 in (1.91 m)	194 lb (88 kg)	Fr	IMG Academy	Delray Beach, FL
F	5	Zaakir Williamson	6 ft 7 in (2.01 m)	230 lb (104 kg)	RS So	Neumann Goretti HS	Philadelphia, PA
G	10	Shawn Fulcher	6 ft 0 in (1.83 m)	170 lb (77 kg)	Fr	Ellsworth CC	Brooklyn, NY
F	11	Bryson Wilson	6 ft 5 in (1.96 m)	210 lb (95 kg)	Fr	St. Stephen's & St. Agnes School	Washington, D.C.
G/F	12	James Graham	6 ft 7 in (2.01 m)	208 lb (94 kg)	Jr	Missouri State	Milwaukee, WI
G	14	Lloyd McVeigh	6 ft 6 in (1.98 m)	205 lb (93 kg)	Fr	The Southport School	Cabarita Beach, Australia
F	15	Jonnivius Smith	6 ft 9 in (2.06 m)	200 lb (91 kg)	Sr	Seton Hall	Selma, AL
G	24	Diovion Famakinde	6 ft 3 in (1.91 m)	224 lb (102 kg)	Fr	Hargrave Military Academy	Woodstock, CT

Head coach

- George Halcovage III (Babson)

Assistant coach(es)

- Hamlet Tibbs (West Virginia)
- Jake Presutti (Syracuse)
- Calvin Cage (Buffalo)

Legend

- (C) Team captain
- (S) Suspended
- (I) Ineligible
- (W) Walk-on
- Injured
- Current redshirt

Roster
Last update: December 8, 2023

== Schedule and results ==
Date time, TV	Rank^{#}	Opponent^{#}	Result	Record	High points	High rebounds	High assists	Site (attendance) city, state
Exhibition
October 23, 2023*; 7:00 p.m.		Daemen	W 71–67	–	15 – tied	7 – tied	7 – Adams	Alumni Arena (1,751); Amherst, NY
Non-conference regular season
November 6, 2023*; 7:30 p.m., ESPN+		Fairleigh Dickinson	L 86–92	0–1	28 – Adams	19 – Smith	5 – Adams	Alumni Arena (2,500); Amherst, NY
November 11, 2023*; 2:00 p.m., ESPN+		South Alabama; MAC-SBC Challenge	L 56–70	0–2	16 – Chatman	8 – Chatman	5 – Jones	Alumni Arena (2,080); Amherst, NY
November 15, 2023*; 7:00 p.m., ESPN+		Roberts Wesleyan	W 89–83	1–2	19 – Chatman	16 – Smith	5 – Fulcher	Alumni Arena (2,169); Amherst, NY
November 20, 2023*; 7:30 p.m., FloSports		vs. Hofstra; Gulf Coast Showcase quarterfinals	L 68–102	1–3	15 – Chatman	8 – Smith	5 – Adams	Hertz Arena (314); Estero, FL
November 21, 2023*; 1:30 p.m., FloSports		vs. Louisiana; Gulf Coast Showcase consolation 2nd round	L 60–68	1–4	13 – tied	8 – Smith	3 – tied	Hertz Arena (231); Estero, FL
November 22, 2023*; 11:00 a.m., FloSports		vs. Iona; Gulf Coast Showcase 7th-place game	L 64–89	1–5	14 – Chatman	10 – Smith	3 – Saboi	Hertz Arena (213); Estero, FL
November 29, 2023*; 7:00 p.m., ESPN+		at No. 22 James Madison	L 66–81	1–6	19 – Chatman	5 – tied	3 – tied	Atlantic Union Bank Center (5,106); Harrisonburg, VA
December 2, 2023*; 2:00 p.m., ESPN+		St. Bonaventure	L 65–80	1–7	20 – Chatman	11 – Chatman	5 – Fulcher	Alumni Arena (3,324); Amherst, NY
December 5, 2023*; 8:30 p.m., FS1		at Butler	L 59–72	1–8	16 – Chatman	8 – Chatman	3 – Boldin Jr.	Hinkle Fieldhouse (6,262); Indianapolis, IN
December 9, 2023*; 2:00 p.m., ESPN+		Western Kentucky	L 65–82	1–9	21 – Chatman	11 – Chatman	7 – Sabol	Alumni Arena (2,186); Amherst, NY
December 21, 2023*; 7:00 p.m., ESPN+		at Richmond	L 66–72	1–10	21 – Chatman	8 – Smith	3 – Fulcher	Robins Center (4,897); Richmond, VA
December 29, 2023*; 7:00 p.m., ESPN+		Niagara	L 63–69	1–11	29 – Chatman	13 – Chatman	6 – Sabol	Alumni Arena (4,663); Amherst, NY
MAC regular season
January 2, 2024; 7:00 p.m., ESPN+		at Central Michigan	W 76–64	2–11 (1–0)	26 – Chatman	15 – Smith	3 – tied	McGuirk Arena (1,088); Mount Pleasant, MI
January 6, 2024; 2:00 p.m., ESPN+		Western Michigan	L 77–82	2–12 (1–1)	24 – Chatman	13 – Smith	4 – Adams	Alumni Arena (2,260); Amherst, NY
January 9, 2024; 7:00 p.m., ESPN+		Miami (OH)	L 65–86	2–13 (1–2)	20 – Fulcher	5 – tied	5 – Adams	Alumni Arena (1,361); Amherst, NY
January 12, 2024; 7:00 p.m., CBSSN		at Akron	L 59–76	2–14 (1–3)	23 – Chatman	7 – tied	8 – Adams	James A. Rhodes Arena (2,535); Akron, OH
January 16, 2024; 7:00 p.m., ESPN+		at Toledo	L 66–77	2–15 (1–4)	24 – Adams	10 – Smith	4 – Chatman	Savage Arena (3,689); Toledo, OH
January 23, 2024; 7:00 p.m., ESPN+		Ball State	L 59–87	2–16 (1–5)	27 – Chatman	7 – tied	5 – Sabol	Alumni Arena (2,007); Amherst, NY
January 27, 2024; 3:30 p.m., ESPN+		at Eastern Michigan	L 65–75	2–17 (1–6)	13 – Adams	11 – Smith	4 – Adams	George Gervin GameAbove Center (2,095); Ypsilanti, MI
January 30, 2024; 7:00 p.m., ESPN+		at Ohio	L 70–91	2–18 (1–7)	22 – Chatman	13 – Smith	4 – Chatman	Convocation Center (3,652); Athens, OH
February 2, 2024; 6:30 p.m., CBSSN		Kent State	L 52–83	2–19 (1–8)	12 – tied	5 – Boldin Jr.	3 – tied	Alumni Arena (2,042); Amherst, NY
February 6, 2024; 7:00 p.m., ESPN+		at Bowling Green	L 73–87	2–20 (1–9)	21 – Sabol	9 – Smith	6 – tied	Stroh Center (1,704); Bowling Green, OH
February 10, 2024*; 3:00 p.m., ESPN+		at Georgia Southern; MAC-SBC Challenge	W 82–81 ^{OT}	3–20	24 – Adams	12 – Chatman	6 – Adams	Hanner Fieldhouse (1,524); Statesboro, GA
February 13, 2024; 8:00 p.m., ESPN+		at Northern Illinois	L 68–72	3–21 (1–10)	18 – Chatman	12 – Smith	5 – tied	Convocation Center (1,425); DeKalb, IL
February 17, 2024; 2:00 p.m., ESPN+		Akron	L 62–73	3–22 (1–11)	24 – Chatman	8 – Chatman	4 – tied	Alumni Arena (2,721); Amherst, NY
February 20, 2024; 7:00 p.m., ESPN+		Eastern Michigan	W 78–69	4–22 (2–11)	23 – Chatman	13 – Chatman	8 – Fulcher	Alumni Arena (2,946); Amherst, NY
February 24, 2024; 2:30 p.m., ESPN+		at Western Michigan	L 72–91	4–23 (2–12)	23 – Chatman	11 – Smith	4 – Adams	University Arena (1,928); Kalamazoo, MI
February 27, 2024; 7:00 p.m., ESPN+		at Kent State	L 64–76	4–24 (2–13)	19 – Adams	10 – Smith	5 – Fulcher	MAC Center (2,928); Kent, OH
March 2, 2024; 2:00 p.m., ESPN+		Toledo	L 79–85	4–25 (2–14)	25 – Chatman	10 – Chatman	5 – Adams	Alumni Arena (2,476); Amherst, NY
March 5, 2024; 7:00 p.m., CBSSN		Ohio	L 66–78	4–26 (2–15)	25 – Chatman	8 – tied	7 – Adams	Alumni Arena (2,140); Amherst, NY
March 8, 2024; 7:00 p.m., ESPN+		Northern Illinois	L 68–78	4–27 (2–16)	22 – Sabol	7 – Smith	5 – Fulcher	Alumni Arena (2,416); Amherst, NY
*Non-conference game. ^{#}Rankings from AP poll. (#) Tournament seedings in parentheses. All times are in Eastern Time.
