= 2023–24 Northern Illinois Huskies men's basketball team =

American college basketball season

2023–24 Northern Illinois Huskies men's basketball
- Conference: Mid-American Conference
- Record: 11–20 (5–13 MAC)
- Head coach: Rashon Burno (3rd season)
- Assistant coaches: Shane Southwell; Drew Gladstone; Drew Kelly
- Home arena: Convocation Center

2023–24 Mid-American Conference men's basketball standings
	Conf.				Overall
Team	W		L	PCT	W		L	PCT
Toledo	14	–	4	.778	20	–	12	.625
Akron †	13	–	5	.722	24	–	11	.686
Ohio	13	–	5	.722	20	–	13	.606
Central Michigan	12	–	6	.667	18	–	14	.563
Bowling Green	10	–	8	.556	20	–	14	.588
Western Michigan	9	–	9	.500	12	–	20	.375
Miami (OH)	9	–	9	.500	15	–	17	.469
Kent State	8	–	10	.444	17	–	17	.500
Ball State	7	–	11	.389	15	–	16	.484
Eastern Michigan	6	–	12	.333	13	–	18	.419
Northern Illinois	5	–	13	.278	11	–	20	.355
Buffalo	2	–	16	.111	4	–	27	.129
† 2024 MAC tournament winner

The 2023–24 Northern Illinois Huskies men's basketball team represented Northern Illinois University in the 2023–24 NCAA Division I men's basketball season. The Huskies were led by third-year head coach Rashon Burno. They played their home games at the Convocation Center in DeKalb, Illinois as members of the Mid-American Conference. They finished the season 11–20, 5–13 in MAC play to finish in 11th place. They failed to qualify for the MAC tournament

== Previous season ==
The Huskies finished the 2022–23 season 13–19 and 9–9 in the MAC to finish a tie for sixth place. As the seventh seed in the MAC tournament they lost to Kent State in the first round.

== Offseason ==
=== Departures ===
Departures
Name	Number	Pos.	Height	Weight	Year	Hometown	Reason
Taku Youngblood	1	G	6'2"	185	Freshman	Yokohama, Japan	Entered Transfer Portal
Kaleb Thornton	3	G	6'0"	175	Junior	Bolingbrook, Illinois	Transferred to Akron
Darweshi Hunter	24	G	6'5"	200	Freshman	Cincinnati, Ohio	Transferred to Miami (OH)
Drew Wiemers	25	F	6'4"	200	Senior	Coal Valley, Illinois	
Armandas Plintauskas	41	G	6'4"	185	Freshman	Kėdainiai, Lithuania	Transferred to Merrimack
Anthony Crump	50	G	6'8"	215	Senior	Inkster, Michigan	Transferred to Western Michigan

=== Incoming transfers ===
Incoming transfers
Name	Number	Pos.	Height	Weight	Year	Hometown	Previous School
Philmon Gebrewhit	5	G	6'8"	185	Senior	Boston, Massachusetts	Transferred from DePaul
Ethan Butler	15	G	6'7"	205	Sophomore	Toronto, Ontario	Transferred from Oregon
Quaran McPherson	24	G	6'4"	197	Sophomore	Queens, NY	Transferred from Nebraska

=== Recruiting class ===
College recruiting information
Name	Hometown	School	Height	Weight	Commit date
Will Lovings-Watts; G	Jefferson, Indiana	Putnam Science	6 ft 5 in (1.96 m)	180 lb (82 kg)	
Will Lovings-Watts; G	Recruit ratings: Scout: Rivals: 247Sports: (80)				
Nasir Muhammad; G	Brooklyn, NY	Xaverian	6 ft 2 in (1.88 m)	180 lb (82 kg)	Apr 18, 2023
Nasir Muhammad; G	Recruit ratings: Scout: Rivals: 247Sports: (NR)				
Leo Amari; G	Sherman Oaks, California	Viewpoint	6 ft 2 in (1.88 m)	170 lb (77 kg)	
Leo Amari; G	Recruit ratings: Scout: Rivals: 247Sports: (NR)				
Luka Gogic; F	Belgrade, Serbia	IMG Academy	6 ft 6 in (1.98 m)	190 lb (86 kg)	
Luka Gogic; F	Recruit ratings: Scout: Rivals: 247Sports: (NR)				
Overall recruit ranking:
Note: In many cases, Scout, Rivals, 247Sports, On3, and ESPN may conflict in their listings of height and weight.; In these cases, the average was taken. ESPN grades are on a 100-point scale.; Sources: "2023 Team Ranking". Rivals.

== Roster ==
2023–24 Northern Illinois Huskies men's basketball team
Players
Coaches

Pos.	#	Name	Height	Weight	Year	Previous school	Hometown
G	0	Keshawn Williams	6 ft 4 in (1.93 m)	175 lb (79 kg)	Sr	Tulsa	Chicago Heights, IL
G	1	Will Lovings-Watts	6 ft 5 in (1.96 m)	180 lb (82 kg)	Fr	Putnam Science	Jefferson, Indiana
G	2	Zarique Nutter	6 ft 7 in (2.01 m)	190 lb (86 kg)	Jr	Clarendon College	Newark, NJ
G	3	Nasir Muhammad	6 ft 2 in (1.88 m)	180 lb (82 kg)	Fr	Xaverian	Brooklyn, NY
F	4	Oluwasegun Durosinmi	6 ft 9 in (2.06 m)	235 lb (107 kg)	Jr	St. Bonaventure	Lagos, Nigeria
G	5	Philmon Gebrewhit	6 ft 8 in (2.03 m)	190 lb (86 kg)	Sr	DePaul	Boston, MA
G	10	Zion Russell	6 ft 2 in (1.88 m)	185 lb (84 kg)	Jr	National Christian Academy	Upper Marlboro, MD
G	11	David Coit	5 ft 11 in (1.8 m)	175 lb (79 kg)	Jr	Atlantic Cape Community College	Columbus, NJ
F	13	Xavier Amos	6 ft 8 in (2.03 m)	210 lb (95 kg)	So	Whitney Young	Chicago, IL
F	14	Yanic Konan Niederhäuser	6 ft 11 in (2.11 m)	215 lb (98 kg)	So	Ursping	Fraschels, Switzerland
F	15	Ethan Butler	6 ft 7 in (2.01 m)	205 lb (93 kg)	So	Oregon	Toronto, ON
G	20	Leo Amari IV	6 ft 2 in (1.88 m)	170 lb (77 kg)	Fr	Viewpoint	Sherman Oaks, CA
F	21	Luka Gogic	6 ft 6 in (1.98 m)	190 lb (86 kg)	Fr	IMG Academy	Belgrade, Serbia
G	21	Steve Tipton	6 ft 2 in (1.88 m)	155 lb (70 kg)	So	Brookfield Central High School	Brookfield, WI
F	23	Harvin Ibarguen	6 ft 9 in (2.06 m)	235 lb (107 kg)	Sr	Seward County Community College	Cali, Colombia
G	24	Quaran McPherson	6 ft 4 in (1.93 m)	197 lb (89 kg)	So	Nebraska	Queens, NY

Head coach

- Rashon Burno (DePaul)

Assistant coach(es)

- Shane Southwell (Kansas State)
- Drew Gladstone (DePaul)
- Drew Kelly (Villanova)

Legend

- (C) Team captain
- (S) Suspended
- (I) Ineligible
- (W) Walk-on
- Injured
- Current redshirt

Roster

== Schedule and results ==
Date time, TV	Rank^{#}	Opponent^{#}	Result	Record	High points	High rebounds	High assists	Site (attendance) city, state
Exhibition
November 1, 2023*; 7:00 p.m.		Illinois Wesleyan	W 81–64	–	16 – Konan Niederhauser	9 – Amos	3 – Tied	Convocation Center (387); DeKalb, IL
Non-conference regular season
November 6, 2023*; 7:30 p.m., FS1		at No. 5 Marquette	L 70–92	0–1	14 – Coit	11 – Konan Niederhauser	3 – Tied	Fiserv Forum (16,352); Milwaukee, WI
November 11, 2023*; 3:00 p.m., ESPN+		Appalachian State; MAC-SBC Challenge	W 91–78	1–1	27 – Coit	6 – Nutter	6 – Coit	Convocation Center (1,071); DeKalb, IL
November 13, 2023*; 7:00 p.m., ESPN+		Illinois Tech	W 107–55	2–1	19 – Lovings-Watts	7 – Konan Niederhauser	5 – Coit	Convocation Center (596); DeKalb, IL
November 17, 2023*; 1:00 p.m., ESPN+		at Georgia State; Capitol Challenge	W 70–64	3–1	22 – Nutter	9 – Ibarguen	5 – Coit	GSU Convocation Center (1,337); Atlanta, GA
November 18, 2023*; 1:00 p.m.		vs. Little Rock; Capitol Challenge	W 98–93	4–1	21 – Amos	8 – Coit	6 – Coit	GSU Convocation Center (1,188); Atlanta, GA
November 25, 2023*; 8:00 p.m., FS2		at DePaul	W 89–79	5–1	34 – Coit	8 – Amos	4 – Gebrewhit	Wintrust Arena (2,745); Chicago, IL
November 27, 2023*; 7:00 p.m., BTN+		at Northwestern	L 67–89	5–2	26 – Amos	7 – Amos	6 – Nutter	Welsh–Ryan Arena (4,564); Evanston, IL
December 5, 2023*; 7:00 p.m., ESPN+		Indiana State	L 67–90	5–3	13 – Coit	6 – Amos	2 – Coit	Convocation Center (1,242); DeKalb, IL
December 9, 2023*; 1:00 p.m.		at Monmouth	L 71–74	5–4	21 – Tied	11 – Amos	4 – Coit	OceanFirst Bank Center (1,722); West Long Branch, NJ
December 18, 2023*; 7:30 p.m., ESPN+		Calumet College	W 92–48	6–4	23 – Lovings-Watts	10 – Tied	3 – Coit	Convocation Center (747); DeKalb, IL
December 21, 2023*; 7:00 p.m., ESPN+		Northern Iowa	L 63–76	6–5	17 – Coit	8 – Konan Niederhauser	3 – Coit	Convocation Center (803); DeKalb, IL
December 29, 2023*; 6:00 p.m., BTN+		at Iowa	L 74–103	6–6	23 – Coit	5 – Tied	3 – Tied	Carver–Hawkeye Arena (11,846); Iowa City, IA
MAC regular season
January 2, 2024; 7:00 p.m., ESPN+		Akron	L 51–73	6–7 (0–1)	21 – Coit	7 – Ibarguen	2 – Ibarguen	Convocation Center (917); DeKalb, IL
January 6, 2024; 1:00 p.m., ESPN+		at Ohio	L 66–78	6–8 (0–2)	22 – Amos	7 – Amos	3 – Tied	Convocation Center (3,802); Athens, OH
January 9, 2024; 6:00 p.m., ESPN+		at Western Michigan	L 90–95 ^{OT}	6–9 (0–3)	32 – Coit	13 – Ibarguen	10 – Coit	University Arena (1,339); Kalamazoo, MI
January 13, 2024; 3:00 p.m., ESPN+		Bowling Green	L 72–83	6–10 (0–4)	27 – Coit	8 – Amos	3 – Gebrewhit	Convocation Center (1,041); DeKalb, IL
January 16, 2024; 7:00 p.m., ESPN+		Kent State	L 76–83	6–11 (0–5)	20 – Amos	5 – Butler	4 – Coit	Convocation Center (809); DeKalb, IL
January 23, 2024; 7:00 p.m., ESPN+		Toledo	L 73–89	6–12 (0–6)	23 – Coit	6 – Nutter	3 – Coit	Convocation Center (1,534); DeKalb, IL
January 27, 2024; 1:00 p.m., ESPN+		at Ball State	L 71–81	6–13 (0–7)	25 – Coit	8 – Amos	3 – Tied	Worthen Arena (4,010); Muncie, IN
January 30, 2024; 6:00 p.m., ESPN+		at Central Michigan	L 77–84 ^{2OT}	6–14 (0–8)	25 – Amos	11 – Ibarguen	3 – Russell	McGuirk Arena (1,520); Mount Pleasant, MI
February 3, 2024; 3:00 p.m., ESPN+		Eastern Michigan	W 76–66	7–14 (1–8)	19 – Amos	7 – Tied	5 – Nutter	Convocation Center (1,537); DeKalb, IL
February 6, 2024; 6:00 p.m., ESPN+		at Miami (OH)	W 62–59	8–14 (2–8)	22 – Nutter	12 – Amos	2 – Tied	Millett Hall (2,242); Oxford, OH
February 10, 2024*; 2:00 p.m., ESPN+		at South Alabama; MAC-SBC Challenge	L 66–75	8–15	16 – Amos	10 – Nutter	4 – Tied	Mitchell Center (1,539); Mobile, AL
February 13, 2024; 7:00 p.m., ESPN+		Buffalo	W 72–68	9–15 (3–8)	25 – Amos	12 – Nutter	2 – Tied	Convocation Center (1,425); DeKalb, IL
February 17, 2024; 1:00 p.m., ESPN+		at Kent State	L 47–85	9–16 (3–9)	17 – Butler	5 – Butler	3 – Coit	MAC Center (2,894); Kent, OH
February 20, 2024; 7:00 p.m., ESPN+		Ball State	L 63–70	9–17 (3–10)	28 – Coit	10 – Tied	2 – Tied	Convocation Center (1,317); DeKalb, IL
February 24, 2024; 3:30 p.m., ESPN+		Ohio	L 59–80	9–18 (3–11)	27 – Coit	6 – Tied	2 – Tied	Convocation Center (2,886); DeKalb, IL
February 27, 2024; 6:00 p.m., ESPN+		at Toledo	W 75–72	10–18 (4–11)	27 – Coit	10 – Lovings-Watts	5 – Tied	Savage Arena (4,692); Toledo, OH
March 2, 2024; 6:00 p.m., ESPN+		at Akron	L 73–80	10–19 (4–12)	35 – Coit	7 – Tied	3 – Tied	James A. Rhodes Arena (2,331); Akron, OH
March 5, 2024; 7:00 p.m., ESPN+		Central Michigan	L 63–69	10–20 (4–13)	27 – Konan Niederhauser	8 – Konan Niederhauser	4 – Coit	Convocation Center (1,399); DeKalb, IL
March 8, 2024; 6:00 p.m., ESPN+		at Buffalo	W 78–68	11–20 (5–13)	37 – Coit	11 – Tied	6 – Coit	Alumni Arena (2,416); Buffalo, NY
*Non-conference game. ^{#}Rankings from AP Poll. (#) Tournament seedings in parentheses. All times are in Central Time.
