= 2023–24 Akron Zips men's basketball team =

American college basketball season

2023–24 Akron Zips men's basketball

MAC tournament champions

NCAA tournament, First Round
- Conference: Mid-American Conference
- Record: 24–11 (13–5 MAC)
- Head coach: John Groce (7th season)
- Associate head coach: Dustin Ford (7th season)
- Assistant coaches: Rob Fulford (7th season); Robby Pridgen (7th season)
- Home arena: James A. Rhodes Arena

2023–24 Mid-American Conference men's basketball standings
	Conf.				Overall
Team	W		L	PCT	W		L	PCT
Toledo	14	–	4	.778	20	–	12	.625
Akron †	13	–	5	.722	24	–	11	.686
Ohio	13	–	5	.722	20	–	13	.606
Central Michigan	12	–	6	.667	18	–	14	.563
Bowling Green	10	–	8	.556	20	–	14	.588
Western Michigan	9	–	9	.500	12	–	20	.375
Miami (OH)	9	–	9	.500	15	–	17	.469
Kent State	8	–	10	.444	17	–	17	.500
Ball State	7	–	11	.389	15	–	16	.484
Eastern Michigan	6	–	12	.333	13	–	18	.419
Northern Illinois	5	–	13	.278	11	–	20	.355
Buffalo	2	–	16	.111	4	–	27	.129
† 2024 MAC tournament winner

The 2023–24 Akron Zips men's basketball team represented the University of Akron during the 2023–24 NCAA Division I men's basketball season. The Zips, led by seventh-year head coach John Groce, played their home games at the James A. Rhodes Arena in Akron, Ohio as members of the Mid-American Conference. They finished the regular season 21–10, 13–5 in MAC play to finish tied for 2nd place. They defeated Miami, Ohio, and Kent State to win the MAC tournament, earning them a bid to the NCAA Tournament as a 14-seed in the Midwest region. They were defeated by Creighton in the opening round of the NCAA tournament, bringing their final record to 24–11.

== Previous season ==
The Zips finished the 2022–23 season 22–11 and 13–5 in MAC play to finish in third place. As the third seed they defeated Buffalo in the first round of the MAC tournament before losing to Kent State.

== Offseason ==
=== Departures ===
Departures
Name	Pos.	Height	Weight	Year	Hometown	Notes
Garvin Clarke	G	6'0"	184	Sophomore	Euclid, Ohio	Transferred to Indiana (PA)
Kobe Mitchell	G	6'2"	190	Sophomore	Cadiz, Ohio	Transferred to Walsh
Trendon Hankerson	G	6'2"	185	Grad. Student	Euclid, Ohio	Exhausted Eligibility
Xavier Castaneda	G	6'1"	188	Senior	Chicago, Illinois	Exhausted Eligibility
Prince Mosengo	F	6'8"	205	Freshman	Democratic Republic of the Congo	Transferred to Northeastern Oklahoma A&M College

=== Incoming transfers ===
Transfers
Name	Pos.	Height	Weight	Year	Hometown	Previous school
Shammah Scott	G	6'2	180	Junior	Cleveland, Ohio	Transferred from Wichita State
Kaleb Thornton	G	6'0	175	Senior	Cadiz, Ohio	Transferred from Northern Illinois
Ali Ali	G	6'8	205	Senior	Kendallville, Indiana	Transferred from Butler

=== Recruiting class ===
College recruiting information
Name	Hometown	School	Height	Weight	Commit date
Darrion Baker; F	Chicago, Illinois	Hillcrest	6 ft 8 in (2.03 m)	225 lb (102 kg)	
Darrion Baker; F	Recruit ratings: Scout: Rivals: 247Sports: (NR)				
Zach Halligan; G/F	Uniontown, Ohio	Walsh Jesuit High School	6 ft 4 in (1.93 m)	205 lb (93 kg)	
Zach Halligan; G/F	Recruit ratings: Scout: Rivals: 247Sports: (NR)				
Marvin Musiime-Kamali; G/F	Boston, Massachusetts	Cushing Academy	6 ft 6 in (1.98 m)	195 lb (88 kg)	
Marvin Musiime-Kamali; G/F	Recruit ratings: Scout: Rivals: 247Sports: (NR)				
Overall recruit ranking:
Note: In many cases, Scout, Rivals, 247Sports, On3, and ESPN may conflict in their listings of height and weight.; In these cases, the average was taken. ESPN grades are on a 100-point scale.; Sources: "2023 Team Ranking". Rivals.

== Roster ==
2023–24 Akron Zips men's basketball team
Players
Coaches

Pos.	#	Name	Height	Weight	Year	Previous school	Hometown
F	0	Amani Lyles	6 ft 7 in (2.01 m)	226 lb (103 kg)	So	Beechcroft	Columbus, OH
G	1	Shammah Scott	6 ft 2 in (1.88 m)	180 lb (82 kg)	Jr	Wichita State	Cleveland, OH
G	2	Greg Tribble	6 ft 3 in (1.91 m)	195 lb (88 kg)	Sr	Huntington Prep	Bolingbrook, IL
G	3	Kaleb Thornton	6 ft 0 in (1.83 m)	175 lb (79 kg)	Sr	Northern Illinois	Cadiz, OH
F	4	Darrion Baker	6 ft 8 in (2.03 m)	225 lb (102 kg)	Fr	Hillcrest	Chicago, IL
G	5	Tavari Johnson	5 ft 11 in (1.8 m)	155 lb (70 kg)	So	Lyons	Chicago, IL
G	10	Ryan Prather Jr.	6 ft 5 in (1.96 m)	205 lb (93 kg)	RS Fr	Clarksburg	Clarksburg, MD
G	11	Sammy Hunter	6 ft 9 in (2.06 m)	225 lb (102 kg)	Sr	Mississippi	Nassau, Bahamas
G	12	Pat Mayfield	6 ft 5 in (1.96 m)	185 lb (84 kg)	Sr	Burlington Central HS	Elgin, IL
G	20	Evan Wilson	6 ft 2 in (1.88 m)	200 lb (91 kg)	Jr	Noblesville HS	Noblesville, IN
G/F	20	Zach Halligan	6 ft 4 in (1.93 m)	205 lb (93 kg)	Fr	Walsh Jesuit	Uniontown, OH
G/F	22	Mikal Dawson	6 ft 5 in (1.96 m)	222 lb (101 kg)	Sr	Huntington Prep	Huntington, WV
G/F	23	Marvin Musiime-Kamali	6 ft 6 in (1.98 m)	195 lb (88 kg)	Fr	Cushing Academy	Boston, MA
G	24	Ali Ali	6 ft 8 in (2.03 m)	205 lb (93 kg)	Sr	Butler	Kendallville, IN
F	25	Enrique Freeman	6 ft 7 in (2.01 m)	206 lb (93 kg)	Sr	St. Martin de Porres HS	Cleveland, OH
G	34	Nate Johnson	6 ft 3 in (1.91 m)	204 lb (93 kg)	RS So	Lakota East HS	Liberty Township, OH

Head coach

- John Groce (Taylor)

Assistant coach(es)

- Dustin Ford (Ohio)
- Rob Fulford (Marshall)
- Robby Pridgen (Roanoke)

Legend

- (C) Team captain
- (S) Suspended
- (I) Ineligible
- (W) Walk-on
- Injured
- Current redshirt

Roster

== Schedule and results ==
Date time, TV	Rank^{#}	Opponent^{#}	Result	Record	High points	High rebounds	High assists	Site (attendance) city, state
Non-conference regular season
November 6, 2023*; 9:15 p.m., SLN		at South Dakota State	W 81–75	1–0	19 – Dawson	14 – Freeman	5 – Freeman	Frost Arena (2,617); Brookings, SD
November 10, 2023*; 7:00 p.m., ESPN+		Southern Miss; MAC-SBC Challenge	W 72–54	2–0	17 – N. Johnson	8 – Freeman	2 – Tied	James A. Rhodes Arena (2,432); Akron, OH
November 14, 2023*; 7:30 p.m., −		Heidelberg	W 114–56	3–0	25 – Dawson	17 – Freeman	9 – Thornton	James A. Rhodes Arena (1,782); Akron, OH
November 19, 2023*; 7:30 p.m., FloSports		vs. FIU; Cayman Islands Classic quarterfinals	W 77–71	4–0	27 – Freeman	14 – Freeman	3 – Dawson	John Gray Gymnasium (−); George Town, Cayman Islands
November 20, 2023*; 7:30 p.m., FloSports		vs. Utah State; Cayman Islands Classic semifinals	L 62–65	4–1	25 – Freeman	13 – Freeman	3 – Tribble	John Gray Gymnasium (−); George Town, Cayman Islands
November 21, 2023*; 5:00 p.m., FloSports		vs. Drake; Cayman Islands Classic 3rd place game	L 59–79	4–2	11 – Tied	5 – Scott	4 – T. Johnson	John Gray Gymnasium (−); George Town, Cayman Islands
November 28, 2023*; 10:00 p.m., MWN		at UNLV	L 70–72	4–3	22 – Freeman	13 – Freeman	6 – Johnson	Thomas & Mack Center (4,702); Paradise, NV
December 5, 2023*; 7:00 p.m., ESPN+		Bradley	W 67–52	5–3	21 – Freeman	18 – Freeman	3 – Tied	James A. Rhodes Arena (3,100); Akron, OH
December 9, 2023*; 7:00 p.m., ESPN+		at Northern Kentucky	W 77–76	6–3	21 – Freeman	10 – Freeman	5 – Tied	Truist Arena (4,163); Highland Heights, KY
December 17, 2023*; 2:00 p.m., −		Miami-Hamilton	W 88–45	7–3	15 – Tied	17 – Freeman	5 – Thornton	James A. Rhodes Arena (2,605); Akron, OH
December 21, 2023*; 6:30 p.m., ESPN+		Gardner–Webb	W 94–90 ^{OT}	8–3	29 – Ali	20 – Freeman	5 – N. Johnson	James A. Rhodes Arena (2,756); Akron, OH
December 30, 2023*; 4:00 p.m., ESPN+		vs. St. Bonaventure; Legends of Basketball Showcase	L 61–62	8–4	20 – Ali	13 – Freeman	3 – Tied	Rocket Mortgage FieldHouse (−); Cleveland, OH
MAC regular season
January 2, 2024; 8:00 p.m., ESPN+		at Northern Illinois	W 73–51	9–4 (1–0)	21 – Freeman	10 – Freeman	5 – Thornton	Convocation Center (917); DeKalb, IL
January 5, 2024; 9:00 p.m., CBSSN		Bowling Green	W 83–67	10–4 (2–0)	24 – Freeman	11 – Freeman	5 – Thornton	James A. Rhodes Arena (2,394); Akron, OH
January 9, 2024; 7:00 p.m., ESPN+		at Ball State	W 80–76	11–4 (3–0)	17 – Ali	13 – Freeman	3 – Ali	Worthen Arena (3,715); Muncie, IN
January 12, 2024; 7:00 p.m., CBSSN		Buffalo	W 76–59	12–4 (4–0)	21 – Freeman	15 – Freeman	4 – Tribble	James A. Rhodes Arena (2,535); Akron, OH
January 16, 2024; 7:00 p.m., ESPN+		Western Michigan	W 77–66	13–4 (5–0)	20 – Freeman	14 – Freeman	6 – Thornton	James A. Rhodes Arena (2,061); Akron, OH
January 19, 2024; 7:00 p.m., ESPNU		at Kent State	W 77–71	14–4 (6–0)	23 – Tied	9 – Scott	4 – Hunter	MAC Center (6,330); Kent, OH
January 23, 2024; 7:00 p.m., ESPN+		Ohio	W 67–58	15–4 (7–0)	19 – Freeman	14 – Freeman	2 – Tied	James A. Rhodes Arena (2,604); Akron, OH
January 27, 2024; 1:00 p.m., ESPN+		at Miami (OH)	L 68–70	15–5 (7–1)	23 – Ali	12 – Freeman	3 – Tied	Millett Hall (1,408); Oxford, OH
January 30, 2024; 7:00 p.m., ESPN+		at Eastern Michigan	W 77–46	16–5 (8–1)	17 – Freeman	11 – Freeman	3 – Ali	George Gervin GameAbove Center (1,733); Ypsilanti, MI
February 3, 2024; 7:00 p.m., ESPN+		Toledo	W 77–70	17–5 (9–1)	26 – Ali	14 – Freeman	4 – Freeman	James A. Rhodes Arena (3,151); Akron, OH
February 6, 2024; 7:00 p.m., ESPN+		Central Michigan	W 68–47	18–5 (10–1)	17 – Tied	15 – Freeman	3 – Thornton	James A. Rhodes Arena (2,268); Akron, OH
February 10, 2024*; 6:00 p.m., ESPN2		at James Madison; MAC-SBC Challenge	L 59–73	18–6	20 – Tribble	10 – Freeman	2 – Freeman	Atlantic Union Bank Center (6,454); Harrisonburg, VA
February 17, 2024; 2:00 p.m., ESPN+		at Buffalo	W 73–62	19–6 (11–1)	16 – Freeman	15 – Freeman	4 – Tied	Alumni Arena (2,721); Buffalo, NY
February 20, 2024; 7:00 p.m., ESPN+		at Toledo	L 64–72	19–7 (11–2)	19 – Tribble	15 – Freeman	2 – Tied	Savage Arena (5,547); Toledo, OH
February 23, 2024; 6:00 p.m., ESPN+		Kent State	W 83–70	20–7 (12–2)	24 – Freeman	12 – Freeman	4 – Ali	James A. Rhodes Arena (5,160); Akron, OH
February 27, 2024; 7:00 p.m., ESPN+		at Ohio	L 67–74	20–8 (12–3)	16 – Ali	7 – Freeman	3 – N. Johnson	Convocation Center (5,753); Athens, OH
March 2, 2024; 7:00 p.m., ESPN+		Northern Illinois	W 80–73	21–8 (13–3)	22 – Freeman	11 – Freeman	4 – Ali	James A. Rhodes Arena (2,331); Akron, OH
March 5, 2024; 7:00 p.m., ESPN+		Eastern Michigan	L 60–61	21–9 (13–4)	15 – Freeman	13 – Freeman	3 – Tied	James A. Rhodes Arena (1,923); Akron, OH
March 8, 2024; 7:00 p.m., ESPN+		at Western Michigan	L 84–90	21–10 (13–5)	18 – Tribble	11 – Freeman	5 – Tribble	University Arena (1,636); Kalamazoo, MI
MAC tournament
March 14, 2024; 4:30 p.m., ESPN+	(2)	vs. (7) Miami (OH); Quarterfinals	W 75–63	22–10	30 – Freeman	12 – Freeman	5 – Ali	Rocket Mortgage FieldHouse (7,854); Cleveland, OH
March 15, 2024; 7:30 p.m., CBSSN	(2)	vs. (3) Ohio; Semifinals	W 65–62	23–10	24 – Freeman	21 – Freeman	3 – Tied	Rocket Mortgage FieldHouse (7,802); Cleveland, OH
March 16, 2024; 7:30 p.m., ESPN2	(2)	vs. (8) Kent State; Championship	W 63–62	24–10	18 – Ali	9 – Freeman	5 – Ali	Rocket Mortgage FieldHouse (7,955); Cleveland, OH
NCAA tournament
March 21, 2024; 1:30 p.m., TNT	(14 MW)	vs. (3 MW) No. 11 Creighton; First Round	L 60–77	24–11	21 – Freeman	14 – Freeman	2 – Ali	PPG Paints Arena; Pittsburgh, PA
*Non-conference game. ^{#}Rankings from AP Poll. (#) Tournament seedings in parentheses. MW=Midwest. All times are in Eastern Time.
