= 2023–24 Central Michigan Chippewas men's basketball team =

American college basketball season

2023–24 Central Michigan Chippewas men's basketball
- Conference: Mid-American Conference
- Record: 18–14 (12–6 MAC)
- Head coach: Tony Barbee (3rd season)
- Assistant coaches: Chris McMillian (3rd season); Scott Cherry (1st season); Hassan Nizam (1st season)
- Home arena: McGuirk Arena

2023–24 Mid-American Conference men's basketball standings
| | Conf. | | | | Overall |
| Team | W | | L | PCT | W | | L | PCT |
|---|---|---|---|---|---|---|---|---|
| Toledo | 14 | – | 4 | .778 | 20 | – | 12 | .625 |
| Akron † | 13 | – | 5 | .722 | 24 | – | 11 | .686 |
| Ohio | 13 | – | 5 | .722 | 20 | – | 13 | .606 |
| Central Michigan | 12 | – | 6 | .667 | 18 | – | 14 | .563 |
| Bowling Green | 10 | – | 8 | .556 | 20 | – | 14 | .588 |
| Western Michigan | 9 | – | 9 | .500 | 12 | – | 20 | .375 |
| Miami (OH) | 9 | – | 9 | .500 | 15 | – | 17 | .469 |
| Kent State | 8 | – | 10 | .444 | 17 | – | 17 | .500 |
| Ball State | 7 | – | 11 | .389 | 15 | – | 16 | .484 |
| Eastern Michigan | 6 | – | 12 | .333 | 13 | – | 18 | .419 |
| Northern Illinois | 5 | – | 13 | .278 | 11 | – | 20 | .355 |
| Buffalo | 2 | – | 16 | .111 | 4 | – | 27 | .129 |
† 2024 MAC tournament winner

The 2023–24 Central Michigan Chippewas men's basketball team represented Central Michigan University in the 2023–24 NCAA Division I men's basketball season. The Chippewas, led by third-year head coach Tony Barbee, played their home games at McGuirk Arena in Mount Pleasant, Michigan as members of the Mid-American Conference (MAC). They finished the regular season 18–13, 12–6 in MAC play, to finish in fourth place. They lost Bowling Green in the first round of the MAC tournament.

== Previous season ==
The Chippewas finished the 2022–23 season 10–21, 5–13 MAC play, to finish in a tie for ninth place. They failed to qualify for the MAC tournament.

== Offseason ==
=== Departures ===
Departures
| Name | Pos. | Height | Weight | Year | Hometown | Notes |
|---|---|---|---|---|---|---|
| Kevin Miller | G | 6' 0" | 165 | Sophomore | Chicago, IL | Transferred to Wake Forest |
| Amani Drummond | G | 6' 0" | 170 | Freshman | Houston, TX | Transferred to Incarnate Word |
| Jesse Zarzuela | G | 6' 3" | 180 | Junior | Houston, TX | Transferred to Oregon |
| Reggie Bass | G | 6' 4" | 185 | Freshman | Muncie, IN | Transferred to Kent State |
| Emil Skyttä | G | 6' 4" | 190 | Freshman | Helsinki, Finland | Transferred to Sacramento State |
| Nicolas Pavrette | C | 6' 11" | 210 | Freshman | Lyon, France | Transferred to George Mason |
| Caleb Hodgson | F | 6' 10" | 235 | Junior | Dansville, MI | Transferred to Taylor University |
| Miroslav Stafl | C | 6' 11" | 235 | Senior | Liberec, Czech Republic | Transferred to Coastal Carolina |
| Ola Ajiboye | F | 6' 8" | 220 | Freshman | Chicago, IL | Transferred to Valparaiso |
| Carrington McCaskill | F | 6' 8" | 210 | Junior | Detroit, MI | |
| Caleb Atewe | F | 6' 9" | 233 | Freshman | Brampton, ON | |

=== Incoming transfers ===
Transfers
| Name | Pos. | Height | Weight | Year | Hometown | Previous school |
|---|---|---|---|---|---|---|
| Paul McMillan IV | G | 6' 2" | 170 | Sophomore | Cincinnati, OH | NJIT |
| Anthony Pritchard | G | 6' 3" | 170 | Junior | Tulsa, OK | Tulsa |
| Aidan Rubio | G/F | 6' 6" | 190 | Sophomore | Flint, MI | Macomb Community College |
| Derrick Butler | G | 6' 2" | 185 | Junior | Charlotte, NC | Chipola College |
| Jemal Davis | F | 6' 8" | 190 | Junior | St. Thomas, USVI | Florida SouthWestern State College |
| KJ Oduor | C | 6' 9" | 215 | Sophomore | Kisumu, Kenya | College of Southern Idaho |

=== Recruiting class ===
College recruiting information
| Name | Hometown | School | Height | Weight | Commit date |
|---|---|---|---|---|---|
| Bryce Eaton; G | Detroit, MI | Edison Public School Academy | 6 ft 0 in (1.83 m) | 170 lb (77 kg) | |
| Bryce Eaton; G | Recruit ratings: Scout: Rivals: 247Sports: (NR) | | | | |
| Cayden Vasko; G | Lowell, IN | Don Bosco Institute | 6 ft 6 in (1.98 m) | 190 lb (86 kg) | |
| Cayden Vasko; G | Recruit ratings: Scout: Rivals: 247Sports: (NR) | | | | |
| Shaedon Simpson; G | Toronto, ON | Combine Academy (N.C.) | 6 ft 6 in (1.98 m) | 180 lb (82 kg) | |
| Shaedon Simpson; G | Recruit ratings: Scout: Rivals: 247Sports: (NR) | | | | |
| Hunter Harding; C | Toronto, ON | Royal Crown Academy | 7 ft 0 in (2.13 m) | 230 lb (100 kg) | |
| Hunter Harding; C | Recruit ratings: Scout: Rivals: 247Sports: (NR) | | | | |
| Drew Barbee; G | Mount Pleasant, MI | Mount Pleasant HS | 6 ft 3 in (1.91 m) | 195 lb (88 kg) | |
| Drew Barbee; G | Recruit ratings: Scout: Rivals: 247Sports: (NR) | | | | |
| Noah Adamczyk; G | Bloomfield Hills, Michigan | Bloomfield Hills HS | 6 ft 0 in (1.83 m) | 180 lb (82 kg) | |
| Noah Adamczyk; G | Recruit ratings: Scout: Rivals: 247Sports: (NR) | | | | |
Overall recruit ranking:
Note: In many cases, Scout, Rivals, 247Sports, On3, and ESPN may conflict in their listings of height and weight.; In these cases, the average was taken. ESPN grades are on a 100-point scale.; Sources: "2023 Team Ranking". Rivals.

== Roster ==
2023–24 Central Michigan Chippewas men's basketball team
Players
Coaches

| Pos. | # | Name | Height | Weight | Year | Hometown |
|---|---|---|---|---|---|---|
| G | 0 | Brian Taylor | 6 ft 6 in (1.98 m) | 205 lb (93 kg) | GS | Detroit, MI |
| G | 1 | Bryce Eaton | 6 ft 0 in (1.83 m) | 170 lb (77 kg) | Fr | Detroit, MI |
| G | 2 | Cayden Vasko | 6 ft 6 in (1.98 m) | 190 lb (86 kg) | Fr | Lowell, IN |
| G | 3 | Derrick Butler | 6 ft 2 in (1.88 m) | 185 lb (84 kg) | Jr | Charlotte, NC |
| F | 4 | Jemal Davis | 6 ft 8 in (2.03 m) | 190 lb (86 kg) | Jr | St. Thomas, USVI |
| F | 5 | Josiah Sanders | 6 ft 5 in (1.96 m) | 235 lb (107 kg) | RS So | Phoenix, AZ |
| G | 10 | Shaedon Simpson | 6 ft 6 in (1.98 m) | 180 lb (82 kg) | Fr | Toronto, ON |
| C | 11 | KJ Oduor | 6 ft 9 in (2.06 m) | 215 lb (98 kg) | So | Kisumu, Kenya |
| C | 12 | Hunter Harding | 7 ft 0 in (2.13 m) | 230 lb (104 kg) | Fr | Toronto, ON |
| G/F | 13 | Aidan Rubio | 6 ft 6 in (1.98 m) | 190 lb (86 kg) | So | Flint, MI |
| C | 15 | Marcus Harding | 6 ft 10 in (2.08 m) | 260 lb (118 kg) | Jr | Toronto, ON |
| G | 22 | Drew Barbee | 6 ft 3 in (1.91 m) | 195 lb (88 kg) | Fr | Mount Pleasant, MI |
| G | 24 | Noah Adamczyk | 6 ft 0 in (1.83 m) | 180 lb (82 kg) | Fr | Bloomfield Hills, MI |
| G | 30 | Anthony Pritchard | 6 ft 2 in (1.88 m) | 185 lb (84 kg) | Jr | Tulsa, OK |
| F | 34 | Paul IV McMillan | 6 ft 2 in (1.88 m) | 170 lb (77 kg) | So | Cincinnati, OH |
| G | 44 | Max Majerle | 6 ft 4 in (1.93 m) | 185 lb (84 kg) | So | Scottsdale, AZ |

Head coach

- Tony Barbee (UMass)

Assistant coach(es)

- Chris McMillian (Wyoming)
- Scott Cherry (North Carolina)
- Hassan Nizam (Capella)

Legend

- (C) Team captain
- (S) Suspended
- (I) Ineligible
- (W) Walk-on
- Injured
- Current redshirt

Roster
Last update: September 26, 2023

== Schedule and results ==
| Date time, TV | Rank^{#} | Opponent^{#} | Result | Record | High points | High rebounds | High assists | Site (attendance) city, state |
Exhibition
| October 22, 2023*; 5:00 p.m. | | Northwood | W 81–55 | – | 16 – Taylor | 8 – Taylor | 3 – tied | McGuirk Arena (327); Mount Pleasant, MI |
| October 29, 2023*; 4:00 p.m. | | Alma | W 92–37 | – | 18 – Butler | 12 – Oduor | 2 – tied | McGuirk Arena (411); Mount Pleasant, MI |
Non-conference regular season
| November 6, 2023*; 8:00 p.m., ESPN+ | | at Oklahoma | L 59–89 | 0–1 | 11 – Pritchard | 9 – Taylor | 2 – Butler | Lloyd Noble Center (6,025); Norman, OK |
| November 11, 2023*; 12:00 p.m., ESPN+ | | Louisiana–Monroe; MAC–SBC Challenge | L 64–74 | 0–2 | 15 – Pritchard | 9 – Taylor | 5 – Pritchard | McGuirk Arena (1,160); Mount Pleasant, MI |
| November 13, 2023*; 7:00 p.m., ACCNX | | at Florida State; Sunshine Slam campus game | L 67–94 | 0–3 | 16 – Pritchard | 9 – Pritchard | 5 – Pritchard | Donald L. Tucker Civic Center (4,953); Tallahassee, FL |
| November 15, 2023*; 7:00 p.m., ESPN+ | | at South Florida | W 68–63 | 1–3 | 22 – Pritchard | 6 – tied | 5 – Pritchard | Yuengling Center (2,965); Tampa, FL |
| November 20, 2023*; 11:30 a.m., FloSports | | vs. Siena; Sunshine Slam Ocean Bracket semifinals | W 70–56 | 2–3 | 21 – Taylor | 7 – Pritchard | 9 – Pritchard | Ocean Center; Daytona Beach, FL |
| November 21, 2023*; 12:00 p.m., FloSports | | vs. Stetson; Sunshine Slam Ocean Bracket championship | L 61–71 | 2–4 | 21 – Taylor | 10 – Taylor | 7 – Pritchard | Ocean Center; Daytona Beach, FL |
| November 29, 2023*; 7:00 p.m., BTN | | at Ohio State | L 61–88 | 2–5 | 15 – Davis | 5 – Taylor | 4 – Pritchard | Value City Arena (8,223); Columbus, OH |
| December 6, 2023*; 7:00 p.m., ESPN+ | | Valparaiso | W 71–67 | 3–5 | 24 – Butler | 7 – tied | 4 – Pritchard | McGuirk Arena (1,193); Mount Pleasant, MI |
| December 9, 2023*; 2:00 p.m., FS2 | | at No. 10 Creighton | L 64–109 | 3–6 | 28 – Butler | 7 – Butler | 4 – Pritchard | CHI Health Center Omaha (16,412); Omaha, NE |
| December 19, 2023*; 7:00 p.m., ESPN+ | | Davenport | W 90–66 | 4–6 | 21 – Taylor | 10 – Taylor | 7 – Taylor | McGuirk Arena (1,011); Mount Pleasant, MI |
| December 21, 2023*; 7:00 p.m., ESPN+ | | Detroit Mercy | W 75–63 | 5–6 | 19 – Taylor | 11 – Taylor | 7 – Pritchard | McGuirk Arena (1,178); Mount Pleasant, MI |
| December 30, 2023*; 2:00 p.m., NBC Sports | | at Loyola–Chicago | L 35–73 | 5–7 | 8 – Pritchard | 9 – Taylor | 4 – Pritchard | Gentile Arena (2,377); Chicago, IL |
MAC regular season
| January 2, 2024; 7:00 p.m., ESPN+ | | Buffalo | L 64–76 | 5–8 (0–1) | 19 – Pritchard | 8 – tied | 3 – Vasko | McGuirk Arena (1,088); Mount Pleasant, MI |
| January 6, 2024; 2:00 p.m., ESPN+ | | at Ball State | W 71–65 | 6–8 (1–1) | 18 – Rubio | 6 – tied | 6 – Pritchard | Worthen Arena (3,612); Muncie, IN |
| January 9, 2024; 7:00 p.m., ESPN+ | | at Eastern Michigan | W 80–64 | 7–8 (2–1) | 17 – tied | 8 – Taylor | 3 – tied | Gervin GameAbove Center (1,639); Ypsilanti, MI |
| January 13, 2024; 2:00 p.m., ESPN+ | | Kent State | W 77–62 | 8–8 (3–1) | 19 – Butler | 9 – Harding | 6 – tied | McGuirk Arena (1,667); Mount Pleasant, MI |
| January 16, 2024; 7:00 p.m., ESPN+ | | at Ohio | L 61–73 | 8–9 (3–2) | 15 – Pritchard | 9 – Taylor | 5 – Pritchard | Convocation Center (4,608); Athens, OH |
| January 19, 2024; 7:00 p.m., CBSSN | | Toledo | W 65–62 | 9–9 (4–2) | 20 – Pritchard | 15 – Taylor | 5 – Harding | McGuirk Arena (2,254); Mount Pleasant, MI |
| January 23, 2024; 7:00 p.m., ESPN+ | | Miami (OH) | W 71–55 | 10–9 (5–2) | 18 – Pritchard | 7 – tied | 8 – Pritchard | McGuirk Arena (1,466); Mount Pleasant, MI |
| January 27, 2024; 1:00 p.m., ESPN+ | | at Western Michigan | W 62–55 | 11–9 (6–2) | 23 – Pritchard | 8 – Pritchard | 6 – Pritchard | University Arena (3,110); Kalamazoo, MI |
| January 30, 2024; 7:00 p.m., ESPN+ | | Northern Illinois | W 84–77 ^{2OT} | 12–9 (7–2) | 21 – McMillan IV | 12 – Taylor | 3 – Taylor | McGuirk Arena (1,520); Mount Pleasant, MI |
| February 3, 2024; 2:00 p.m., ESPN+ | | at Bowling Green | W 77–76 ^{OT} | 13–9 (8–2) | 19 – McMillan IV | 14 – Oduor | 4 – McMillan IV | Stroh Center (2,230); Bowling Green, OH |
| February 6, 2024; 7:00 p.m., ESPN+ | | at Akron | L 47–68 | 13–10 (8–3) | 12 – Rubio | 8 – Taylor | 3 – Vasko | James A. Rhodes Arena (2,268); Akron, OH |
| February 10, 2024*; 7:00 p.m., ESPN+ | | at Old Dominion; MAC–SBC Challenge | W 58–57 | 14–10 | 19 – Davis | 9 – Butler | 3 – Pritchard | Chartway Arena (4,569); Norfolk, VA |
| February 17, 2024; 7:00 p.m., ESPN+ | | Western Michigan | W 69–42 | 15–10 (9–3) | 24 – Butler | 9 – Butler | 6 – Pritchard | McGuirk Arena (5,032); Mount Pleasant, MI |
| February 20, 2024; 7:00 p.m., ESPN+ | | Bowling Green | W 62–60 ^{OT} | 16–10 (10–3) | 15 – Pritchard | 15 – Taylor | 3 – Vasko | McGuirk Arena (1,525); Mount Pleasant, MI |
| February 24, 2024; 3:30 p.m., ESPN+ | | at Miami (OH) | L 60–88 | 16–11 (10–4) | 16 – Pritchard | 9 – Harding | 5 – Pritchard | Millett Hall (6,732); Oxford, OH |
| February 27, 2024; 7:00 p.m., ESPN+ | | Ball State | L 71–79 | 16–12 (10–5) | 25 – McMillan IV | 7 – Butler | 4 – Harding | McGuirk Arena (1,472); Mount Pleasant, MI |
| March 2, 2024; 3:30 p.m., ESPN+ | | at Kent State | L 73–79 ^{OT} | 16–13 (10–6) | 16 – tied | 11 – Taylor | 5 – Pritchard | MAC Center (5,310); Kent, OH |
| March 5, 2024; 7:00 p.m., ESPN+ | | at Northern Illinois | W 69–63 | 17–13 (11–6) | 24 – Butler | 9 – Pritchard | 10 – Pritchard | Convocation Center (1,399); DeKalb, IL |
| March 8, 2024; 7:00 p.m., ESPN+ | | Eastern Michigan | W 65–62 ^{OT} | 18–13 (12–6) | 25 – McMillan IV | 22 – Taylor | 6 – McMillan IV | McGuirk Arena (2,005); Mount Pleasant, MI |
MAC tournament
| March 14, 2024; 1:30 p.m., ESPN+ | (4) | vs. (5) Bowling Green; Quarterfinals | L 56–66 | 18–14 | 14 – Butler | 10 – Taylor | 7 – Pritchard | Rocket Mortgage FieldHouse; Cleveland, OH |
*Non-conference game. ^{#}Rankings from AP poll. (#) Tournament seedings in parentheses. All times are in Eastern.
