= 2023–24 Ball State Cardinals men's basketball team =

American college basketball season

2023–24 Ball State Cardinals men's basketball
- Conference: Mid-American Conference
- Record: 15–16 (7–11 MAC)
- Head coach: Michael Lewis (2nd season)
- Assistant coaches: Ben Botts (6th season); Lou Gudino (2nd season); Jamal Meeks (2nd season)
- Home arena: Worthen Arena

2023–24 Mid-American Conference men's basketball standings
	Conf.				Overall
Team	W		L	PCT	W		L	PCT
Toledo	14	–	4	.778	20	–	12	.625
Akron †	13	–	5	.722	24	–	11	.686
Ohio	13	–	5	.722	20	–	13	.606
Central Michigan	12	–	6	.667	18	–	14	.563
Bowling Green	10	–	8	.556	20	–	14	.588
Western Michigan	9	–	9	.500	12	–	20	.375
Miami (OH)	9	–	9	.500	15	–	17	.469
Kent State	8	–	10	.444	17	–	17	.500
Ball State	7	–	11	.389	15	–	16	.484
Eastern Michigan	6	–	12	.333	13	–	18	.419
Northern Illinois	5	–	13	.278	11	–	20	.355
Buffalo	2	–	16	.111	4	–	27	.129
† 2024 MAC tournament winner

The 2023–24 Ball State Cardinals men's basketball team represented Ball State University in the 2023–24 NCAA Division I men's basketball season. The Cardinals, led by second-year head coach Michael Lewis, played their home games at Worthen Arena in Muncie, Indiana as members of the Mid-American Conference (MAC). They finished the season 15–16, 7–11 in MAC play, to finish in 9th place. They failed to qualify for the MAC tournament.

== Previous season ==
The Cardinals finished the 2022–23 season 20–12 and 11–7 in MAC play. They were the fourth seed in the MAC tournament where they lost to Ohio in the quarterfinals.

== Offseason ==
=== Departures ===
Departures
Name	Pos.	Height	Weight	Year	Hometown	Notes
Jarron Coleman	G	6'5"	210	Redshirt junior	Indianapolis, IN	Transferred to Nebraska
Demarius Jacobs	G	6'2"	185	Senior	Chicago, IL	Exhausted eligibility
Luke Bumbalough	G	6'1"	180	Junior	New Castle, IN	Transferred to Niagara
Payton Sparks	C	6'9"	240	Sophomore	Winchester, IN	Transferred to Indiana
Jaylin Sellers	G	6'4"	180	Sophomore	Columbus, GA	Transferred to UCF
Darian Owens-White	G	6'1"	165	Graduate student	Detroit, MI	Exhausted eligibility
Kaiyem Cleary	G	6'6"	185	Junior	Manchester, England	Transferred to LeMoyne
Jalen Windham	G	6'5"	180	Junior	Indianapolis, IN	Transferred to Morehead State

=== Incoming transfers ===
Transfers
Name	Pos.	Height	Weight	Year	Hometown	Previous school
Jalin Anderson	G	6'3"	185	Junior	Jackson, TN	Loyola Marymount
Ethan Brittain-Watts	G	6'2"	180	Graduate student	Indianapolis, IN	Boston
Davion Bailey	G	6'4"	190	Graduate student	Indianapolis, IN	Southeastern CC

=== Recruiting class ===
College recruiting information
Name	Hometown	School	Height	Weight	Commit date
Jurica Zagorsak; G	Croatia		6 ft 6 in (1.98 m)	N/A	
Jurica Zagorsak; G	Recruit ratings: Scout: Rivals: 247Sports: (NR)				
Joey Brown; G	Indianapolis, IN	North Central	6 ft 5 in (1.96 m)	N/A	
Joey Brown; G	Recruit ratings: Scout: Rivals: 247Sports: (78)				
Mason Jones; G	Valparaiso, Indiana		6 ft 7 in (2.01 m)	N/A	
Mason Jones; G	Recruit ratings: Scout: Rivals: 247Sports: (NR)				
Zane Doughty; C	Indianapolis, IN		6 ft 9 in (2.06 m)	205 lb (93 kg)	
Zane Doughty; C	Recruit ratings: Scout: Rivals: 247Sports: (NR)				
Trent Middleton; G	Philadelphia, PA	Spire Academy	6 ft 3 in (1.91 m)	N/A	
Trent Middleton; G	Recruit ratings: Scout: Rivals: 247Sports: (NR)				
Overall recruit ranking:
Note: In many cases, Scout, Rivals, 247Sports, On3, and ESPN may conflict in their listings of height and weight.; In these cases, the average was taken. ESPN grades are on a 100-point scale.; Sources: "2023 Team Ranking". Rivals.

== Roster ==
2023–24 Ball State Cardinals men's basketball team
Players
Coaches

Pos.	#	Name	Height	Weight	Year	Hometown
G	1	Jalin Anderson	6 ft 3 in (1.91 m)	190 lb (86 kg)	Jr	Jackson, TN
G	2	Ethan Brittain-Watts	6 ft 2 in (1.88 m)	188 lb (85 kg)	GS	Indianapolis, IN
F	3	Mickey Jr. Pearson	6 ft 7 in (2.01 m)	207 lb (94 kg)	RS Jr	Lincoln, AL
G	4	Micah Bell	6 ft 3 in (1.91 m)	168 lb (76 kg)	RS Fr	Austell, GA
G	5	Davion Bailey	6 ft 4 in (1.93 m)	200 lb (91 kg)	Jr	Indianapolis, IN
F	11	Basheer Jihad	6 ft 9 in (2.06 m)	239 lb (108 kg)	Jr	Detroit, MI
G	12	Jurica Zagorsak	6 ft 6 in (1.98 m)	223 lb (101 kg)	Fr	Croatia
G	13	Trent Middleton	6 ft 3 in (1.91 m)	177 lb (80 kg)	Fr	Philadelphia, PA
G	14	Jack Futa	6 ft 5 in (1.96 m)	189 lb (86 kg)	So	South Bend, IN
G	15	Quincy Adams	6 ft 5 in (1.96 m)	172 lb (78 kg)	RS Fr	Frisco, TX
G	23	Joey Brown	6 ft 5 in (1.96 m)	184 lb (83 kg)	Fr	Indianapolis, IN
G	33	Mason Jones	6 ft 7 in (2.01 m)	219 lb (99 kg)	Fr	Valparaiso, IN
C	34	Ben Hendriks	6 ft 10 in (2.08 m)	239 lb (108 kg)	RS Jr	Mississauga, ON
C	54	Zane Doughty	6 ft 9 in (2.06 m)	224 lb (102 kg)	Fr	Indianapolis, IN

Head coach

- Michael Lewis (Indiana)

Assistant coach(es)

- Ben Botts (Purdue Fort Wayne)
- Lou Gudino (Indiana)
- Jamal Meeks (Indiana State)

Legend

- (C) Team captain
- (S) Suspended
- (I) Ineligible
- (W) Walk-on
- Injured
- Current redshirt

Roster
Last update: August 12, 2023

== Schedule and results ==
Date time, TV	Rank^{#}	Opponent^{#}	Result	Record	High points	High rebounds	High assists	Site (attendance) city, state
Exhibition
November 2, 2023*; 7:00 p.m., TBA		Rose–Hulman	W 85–52	–	–	–	–	Worthen Arena; Muncie, IN
Non-conference regular season
November 7, 2023*; 7:00 p.m., ESPN+		Goshen	W 101–40	1–0	21 – Jihad	7 – Doughty	7 – Middleton Jr.	Worthen Arena (3,071); Muncie, IN
November 11, 2023*; 2:00 p.m., ESPN+		Old Dominion; MAC–SBC Challenge	W 73–68	2–0	28 – Anderson	9 – Anderson	2 – tied	Worthen Arena (3,218); Muncie, IN
November 14, 2023*; 7:00 p.m., ESPN+		Oakland City	W 91–51	3–0	20 – Anderson	7 – Brown	3 – Anderson	Worthen Arena (3,277); Muncie, IN
November 18, 2023*; 7:00 p.m., ESPN+		at Evansville	L 50–74	3–1	21 – Jihad	8 – Jihad	2 – Anderson	Ford Center (5,172); Evansville, IN
November 21, 2023*; 7:00 p.m., ESPN+		USC Upstate	W 75–58	4–1	24 – Pearson	7 – Jones	6 – Anderson	Worthen Arena (3,018); Muncie, IN
November 24, 2023*; 2:00 p.m., ESPN+		Arkansas–Pine Bluff	W 92–74	5–1	18 – Jihad	11 – Jihad	8 – Anderson	Worthen Arena (4,071); Muncie, IN
November 28, 2023*; 7:30 p.m., ESPN+		at Little Rock	L 64–90	5–2	25 – Jihad	5 – Pearson Jr.	3 – Jihad	Jack Stephens Center (1,081); Little Rock, AR
December 2, 2023*; 2:00 p.m., ESPN+		Bellarmine	W 67–58	6–2	19 – Jihad	11 – Jihad	6 – Anderson	Worthen Arena (3,588); Muncie, IN
December 6, 2023*; 7:00 p.m., ESPN+		at Detroit Mercy	W 68–65	7–2	26 – Jihad	10 – Jihad	5 – Anderson	Calihan Hall (733); Detroit, MI
December 10, 2023*; 2:00 p.m., ESPN+		SIU Edwardsville	W 83–71	8–2	27 – Jihad	10 – Jihad	5 – Anderson	Worthen Arena (3,254); Muncie, IN
December 16, 2023*; 1:45 p.m., Peacock		vs. Indiana State; Indy Classic	L 72–83	8–3	18 – Anderson	8 – Anderson	6 – Anderson	Gainbridge Fieldhouse; Indianapolis, IN
December 21, 2023*; 8:00 p.m., B1G+		at Minnesota	L 63–80	8–4	26 – Anderson	7 – Jihad	7 – Anderson	Williams Arena (7,261); Minneapolis, MN
MAC regular season
January 2, 2024; 7:00 p.m., ESPN+		at Kent State	L 69–82	8–5 (0–1)	23 – Jihad	7 – Anderson	5 – Anderson	MAC Center (1,796); Kent, OH
January 6, 2024; 2:00 p.m., ESPN+		Central Michigan	L 65–71	8–6 (0–2)	21 – Bailey	11 – Jihad	4 – Anderson	Worthen Arena (3,612); Muncie, IN
January 9, 2024; 7:00 p.m., ESPN+		Akron	L 76–80	8–7 (0–3)	27 – Jihad	16 – Jihad	5 – Anderson	Worthen Arena (3,715); Muncie, IN
January 13, 2024; 7:00 p.m., ESPN+		at Toledo	L 72–77	8–8 (0–4)	25 – Anderson	7 – Pearson Jr.	5 – Anderson	Savage Arena (4,413); Toledo, OH
January 16, 2024; 7:00 p.m., ESPN+		at Eastern Michigan	W 76–62	9–8 (1–4)	23 – Bailey	7 – Bailey	6 – Anderson	George Gervin GameAbove Center (1,546); Ypsilanti, MI
January 20, 2024; 2:00 p.m., ESPN+		Miami (OH)	L 80–87	9–9 (1–5)	29 – Jihad	10 – Pearson Jr.	6 – Anderson	Worthen Arena (4,408); Muncie, IN
January 23, 2024; 7:00 p.m., ESPN+		at Buffalo	W 87–59	10–9 (2–5)	20 – Jihad	11 – Pearson Jr.	4 – tied	Alumni Arena (2,007); Amherst, NY
January 27, 2024; 2:00 p.m., ESPN+		Northern Illinois	W 81–71	11–9 (3–5)	28 – Jihad	14 – Jihad	6 – Anderson	Worthen Arena (4,010); Muncie, IN
January 30, 2024; 7:00 p.m., ESPN+		Bowling Green	L 72–81	11–10 (3–6)	22 – Jihad	8 – Jihad	3 – Pearson Jr.	Worthen Arena (3,488); Muncie, IN
February 3, 2024; 1:00 p.m., ESPN+		at Western Michigan	W 77–67	12–10 (4–6)	20 – Anderson	8 – Jihad	5 – Jones	University Arena (1,729); Kalamazoo, MI
February 6, 2024; 7:00 p.m., ESPN+		Ohio	L 79–84 ^{OT}	12–11 (4–7)	22 – Anderson	9 – tied	5 – Middleton	Worthen Arena (3,218); Muncie, IN
February 10, 2024*; 5:00 p.m., ESPN+		at Texas State; MAC–SBC Challenge	L 60–68	12–12	19 – Jihad	9 – Jihad	4 – Anderson	Strahan Arena (1,407); San Marcos, TX
February 17, 2024; 3:30 p.m., ESPN+		at Miami (OH)	L 59–80	12–13 (4–8)	18 – tied	6 – tied	3 – Anderson	Millett Hall (7,736); Oxford, OH
February 20, 2024; 8:00 p.m., ESPN+		at Northern Illinois	W 70–63	13–13 (5–8)	19 – Anderson	10 – Jihad	7 – Anderson	Convocation Center (1,317); DeKalb, IL
February 24, 2024; 2:00 p.m., ESPN+		Eastern Michigan	L 56–58	13–14 (5–9)	18 – Jihad	16 – Jihad	7 – Anderson	Worthen Arena (4,708); Muncie, IN
February 27, 2024; 7:00 p.m., ESPN+		at Central Michigan	W 79–71	14–14 (6–9)	25 – Pearson Jr.	7 – tied	4 – tied	McGuirk Arena (1,472); Mount Pleasant, MI
March 2, 2024; 2:00 p.m., ESPN+		Western Michigan	L 76–78 ^{OT}	14–15 (6–10)	25 – Anderson	7 – tied	6 – Anderson	Worthen Arena (5,223); Muncie, IN
March 5, 2024; 7:00 p.m., ESPN+		Kent State	W 76–69	15–15 (7–10)	23 – Anderson	10 – Jones	3 – tied	Worthen Arena (3,412); Muncie, IN
March 8, 2024; 7:00 p.m., ESPN+		at Bowling Green	L 70–80	15–16 (7–11)	22 – Anderson	9 – Jihad	5 – Jihad	Stroh Center; Bowling Green, OH
*Non-conference game. ^{#}Rankings from AP poll. (#) Tournament seedings in parentheses. All times are in Eastern.
