= 2023–24 Eastern Michigan Eagles men's basketball team =

American college basketball season

2023–24 Eastern Michigan Eagles men's basketball
- Conference: Mid-American Conference
- Record: 13–18 (6–12 MAC)
- Head coach: Stan Heath (3rd season)
- Assistant coaches: Shawn Trice (3rd season); Bob Simon (3rd season); Drew Denisco (3rd season)
- Home arena: George Gervin GameAbove Center

2023–24 Mid-American Conference men's basketball standings
	Conf.				Overall
Team	W		L	PCT	W		L	PCT
Toledo	14	–	4	.778	20	–	12	.625
Akron †	13	–	5	.722	24	–	11	.686
Ohio	13	–	5	.722	20	–	13	.606
Central Michigan	12	–	6	.667	18	–	14	.563
Bowling Green	10	–	8	.556	20	–	14	.588
Western Michigan	9	–	9	.500	12	–	20	.375
Miami (OH)	9	–	9	.500	15	–	17	.469
Kent State	8	–	10	.444	17	–	17	.500
Ball State	7	–	11	.389	15	–	16	.484
Eastern Michigan	6	–	12	.333	13	–	18	.419
Northern Illinois	5	–	13	.278	11	–	20	.355
Buffalo	2	–	16	.111	4	–	27	.129
† 2024 MAC tournament winner

The 2023–24 Eastern Michigan Eagles men's basketball team represented Eastern Michigan University during the 2023–24 NCAA Division I men's basketball season. The Eagles, led by third-year head coach Stan Heath, played their home games at the George Gervin GameAbove Center in Ypsilanti, Michigan as members of the Mid-American Conference. They finished the season 13–18, 6–12 in MAC play to finish in 10th place. They failed to qualify for the MAC tournament

== Previous season ==
The Eagles finished 8–23 with a 5–13 MAC record. They finished tied for ninth in the MAC and failed to qualify for the MAC tournament.

== Offseason ==
=== Departures ===
Departures
Name	Number	Pos.	Height	Weight	Year	Hometown	Reason
Colin Golson	1	F	6'6"	230	Sophomore	Detroit, Michigan	Transferred to Morehouse
Noah Farrakhan	2	G	6'2"	162	Sophomore	Hillside	Transferred to West Virginia
Luka Savicevic	3	G	6'3"	150	Sophomore	Skopje, North Macedonia	Transferred to Lafayette
Emoni Bates	21	F	6'10"	170	Sophomore	Ypsilanti, Michigan	Declared for NBA draft
JZ Zaher	30	G	5'11"	164	Freshman	Fenton, Michigan	Transferred to Bowling Green
Derek Ballard	33	F	6'8"	232	Grad. Student	Southfield, Michigan	Exhausted Eligibility

=== Incoming transfers ===
Incoming transfers
Name	Number	Pos.	Height	Weight	Year	Hometown	Previous School
Connor Serven	2	F	6'8"		RS-Junior	Prairie City, Illinois	Illinois
John McGriff	3	G	6'0"		RS-Junior	Glenn Dale, Maryland	Binghamton
Cyril Martynov	21	C	7'0"		Sophomore	Barrie, Ontario	Georgia Tech
Julius Ellerbe	6	G	6'7"		RS-Junior	Fort Washington, Maryland	East Central CC

=== Recruiting class ===
College recruiting information
Name	Hometown	School	Height	Weight	Commit date
Arne Osojnik; G	Ljubljana, Slovenia	Dream City Christian	6 ft 6 in (1.98 m)	N/A	
Arne Osojnik; G	Recruit ratings: Scout: Rivals: 247Sports: (NR)				
Overall recruit ranking:
Note: In many cases, Scout, Rivals, 247Sports, On3, and ESPN may conflict in their listings of height and weight.; In these cases, the average was taken. ESPN grades are on a 100-point scale.; Sources: "2023 Team Ranking". Rivals.

== Roster ==
2023–24 Eastern Michigan Eagles men's basketball team
Players
Coaches

Pos.	#	Name	Height	Weight	Year	Previous school	Hometown
G	0	Kevin-David Rice	6 ft 4 in (1.93 m)	—	Jr	Grand Blanc; Delta College	Flint, MI
F	1	Jalin Billingsley	6 ft 8 in (2.03 m)	—	Jr	Lutheran East; Georgetown	Cleveland, OH
F	2	Conner Serven	6 ft 8 in (2.03 m)	—	RS Jr	St. Rita; Illinois	Prairie City, IL
G	3	John McGriff	6 ft 0 in (1.83 m)	—	RS Jr	Bishop McNamara; Binghamton	Glenn Dale, MD
F	4	Legend Geeter	6 ft 8 in (2.03 m)	—	RS So	River Rouge; Providence	River Rouge, MI
G	5	Tyson Acuff	6 ft 4 in (1.93 m)	—	Jr	Cass Technical; Duquesne	Detroit, MI
G	6	Julius Ellerbe	6 ft 7 in (2.01 m)	—	RS Jr	VA Beach Sports Academy; East Central (Miss.) CC	Fort Washington, MD
G	12	Andrew Wells	6 ft 3 in (1.91 m)	—	Jr	International Sports Academy	East Lansing, MI
G	13	Prakash Ketterhagen	6 ft 4 in (1.93 m)	—	RS So	New Rochelle; Combine Academy	Kalamazoo, MI
G	14	Micah Schnyders	6 ft 4 in (1.93 m)	—	RS Jr	Yorkville Christian	New Lenox, IL
F	15	Derik Pranger	6 ft 9 in (2.06 m)	—	RS Fr	Colorado Prep	Parker, CO
C	21	Cyril Martynov	7 ft 0 in (2.13 m)	—	So	Lawrenceville School; Georgia Tech	Barrie, ON
F	22	Yusuf Jihad	6 ft 8 in (2.03 m)	—	Jr	North Farmington; Oakland	Farmington Hills, MI
F	35	Javantae Randle	6 ft 11 in (2.11 m)	—	RS So	Frederick Douglass	Detroit, MI
F	35	Arne Osojnik	6 ft 6 in (1.98 m)	—	RS Fr	Dream City Christian	Ljubljana, Slovenia
G	55	Orlando Lovejoy	6 ft 2 in (1.88 m)	—	So	Summit Academy North	Detroit, MI

Head coach

- Stan Heath (Eastern Michigan)

Assistant coach(es)

- Shawn Trice (Penn)
- Bob Simon (Eastern Michigan)
- Drew Denisco (Wittenberg)

Legend

- (C) Team captain
- (S) Suspended
- (I) Ineligible
- (W) Walk-on
- Injured
- Current redshirt

Roster

== Schedule and results ==
Date time, TV	Rank^{#}	Opponent^{#}	Result	Record	High points	High rebounds	High assists	Site (attendance) city, state
Non-conference regular season
November 6, 2023*; 8:00 p.m., FS1		at Butler	L 55–94	0–1	13 – Tied	5 – Geeter	4 – Ellerbe	Hinkle Fieldhouse (6,792); Indianapolis, IN
November 11, 2023*; 12:00 p.m., ESPN+		Georgia Southern; MAC-SBC Challenge	W 70–60	1–1	18 – Osojnik	7 – Billingsley	4 – McGriff	George Gervin GameAbove Center (1,484); Ypsilanti, MI
November 14, 2023*; 7:00 p.m., ESPN+		at No. 10 Florida Atlantic	L 57–100	1–2	20 – Acuff	5 – Tied	2 – Tied	Eleanor R. Baldwin Arena (3,161); Boca Raton, FL
November 18, 2023*; 1:00 p.m., ESPN+		Cleveland State	W 69–62	2–2	31 – Acuff	8 – Ellerbe	2 – Tied	George Gervin GameAbove Center (1,730); Ypsilanti, MI
November 21, 2023*; 7:00 p.m., ESPN+		at Detroit Mercy	W 76–72	3–2	25 – Acuff	6 – Serven	7 – Ellerbe	Calihan Hall (1,003); Detroit, MI
November 25, 2023*; 5:45 p.m., ESPN+		at Central Arkansas; Central Arkansas Classic	W 74–71	4–2	23 – Acuff	9 – Ellerbe	5 – Ellerbe	Farris Center (592); Conway, AR
November 26, 2023*; 2:00 p.m.		vs. North Dakota; Central Arkansas Classic	L 70–72	4–3	31 – Acuff	5 – Martynov	3 – Acuff	Farris Center (98); Conway, AR
December 1, 2023*; 7:00 p.m., ESPN+		Lake Superior State	W 68–53	5–3	24 – Acuff	8 – Jihad	3 – Acuff	George Gervin GameAbove Center (1,647); Ypsilanti, MI
December 8, 2023*; 7:00 p.m., ESPN+		Oakland	L 63–77	5–4	18 – Acuff	9 – Ellerbe	5 – Tied	George Gervin GameAbove Center (1,796); Ypsilanti, MI
December 16, 2023*; 2:15 p.m., BTN		at Michigan	L 66–83	5–5	24 – Acuff	6 – Ellerbe	2 – Tied	Crisler Center (11,761); Ann Arbor, MI
December 21, 2023*; 1:00 p.m., ESPN+		Hampton	W 72–69	6–5	29 – Acuff	7 – Martynov	4 – Lovejoy	George Gervin GameAbove Center (1,870); Ypsilanti, MI
December 30, 2023*; 1:00 p.m., ESPN+		Northwood	W 67–64	7–5	17 – Lovejoy	10 – Lovejoy	4 – Lovejoy	George Gervin GameAbove Center (1,517); Ypsilanti, MI
MAC regular season
January 2, 2024; 7:00 p.m., ESPN+		at Bowling Green	L 90–92 ^{OT}	7–6 (0–1)	31 – Acuff	9 – Ellerbe	4 – Acuff	Stroh Center (2,439); Bowling Green, OH
January 6, 2024; 3:30 p.m., ESPN+		Kent State	W 71–69 ^{OT}	8–6 (1–1)	16 – Lovejoy	8 – Serven	7 – Acuff	George Gervin GameAbove Center (3,058); Ypsilanti, MI
January 9, 2024; 7:00 p.m., ESPN+		Central Michigan	L 64–80	8–7 (1–2)	16 – Lovejoy	4 – Tied	5 – Acuff	George Gervin GameAbove Center (1,639); Ypsilanti, MI
January 13, 2024; 1:00 p.m., ESPN+		Miami (OH)	L 54–71	8–8 (1–3)	19 – Acuff	8 – Ellerbe	3 – Tied	Millett Hall (929); Oxford, OH
January 16, 2024; 7:00 p.m., ESPN+		Ball State	L 62–76	8–9 (1–4)	21 – Acuff	8 – Billingsley	4 – Acuff	George Gervin GameAbove Center (1,546); Ypsilanti, MI
January 20, 2024; 1:00 p.m., ESPN+		at Ohio	L 67–85	8–10 (1–5)	30 – Acuff	6 – Jihad	1 – Tied	Convocation Center (5,547); Athens, OH
January 23, 2024; 7:00 p.m., ESPN+		at Western Michigan	L 56–73	8–11 (1–6)	14 – Acuff	7 – Tied	4 – Acuff	University Arena (2,208); Kalamazoo, MI
January 27, 2024; 3:30 p.m., ESPN+		Buffalo	W 75–65	9–11 (2–6)	19 – Acuff	7 – Acuff	7 – Lovejoy	George Gervin GameAbove Center (2,095); Ypsilanti, MI
January 30, 2024; 7:00 p.m., ESPN+		Akron	L 46–77	9–12 (2–7)	12 – Tied	4 – Tied	2 – Tied	George Gervin GameAbove Center (1,733); Ypsilanti, MI
February 3, 2024; 4:00 p.m., ESPN+		at Northern Illinois	L 66–76	9–13 (2–8)	19 – Lovejoy	6 – Billingsley	5 – Lovejoy	Convocation Center (1,537); DeKalb, IL
February 6, 2024; 7:00 p.m., ESPN+		Toledo	L 87–91	9–14 (2–9)	24 – Acuff	8 – Billingsley	6 – Lovejoy	George Gervin GameAbove Center (1,542); Ypsilanti, MI
February 10, 2024*; 3:00 p.m., ESPN+		at Louisiana–Monroe; MAC-SBC Challenge	L 76–82	9–15	29 – Acuff	9 – Billingsley	6 – Lovejoy	Fant–Ewing Coliseum (1,102); Monroe, LA
February 17, 2024; 3:30 p.m., ESPN+		Bowling Green	W 69–60	10–15 (3–9)	34 – Acuff	10 – Acuff	3 – Tied	George Gervin GameAbove Center (3,304); Ypsilanti, MI
February 20, 2024; 7:00 p.m., ESPN+		at Buffalo	L 69–78	10–16 (3–10)	26 – Acuff	9 – Serven	4 – Acuff	Alumni Arena (2,946); Buffalo, NY
February 24, 2024; 2:00 p.m., ESPN+		at Ball State	W 58–56	11–16 (4–10)	19 – Acuff	8 – Serven	3 – Tied	Worthen Arena (4,708); Muncie, IN
February 27, 2024; 7:00 p.m., ESPN+		Western Michigan	W 70–67	12–16 (5–10)	22 – Osojnik	8 – Billingsley	4 – Acuff	George Gervin GameAbove Center (1,612); Ypsilanti, MI
March 2, 2024; 1:00 p.m., ESPN+		Miami (OH)	L 37–52	12–17 (5–11)	13 – Billingsley	10 – Billingsley	2 – Tied	George Gervin GameAbove Center (1,588); Ypsilanti, MI
March 5, 2024; 7:00 p.m., ESPN+		at Akron	W 61–60	13–17 (6–11)	14 – Billingsley	8 – Tied	3 – Lovejoy	James A. Rhodes Arena (1,923); Akron, OH
March 8, 2024; 7:00 p.m., ESPN+		at Central Michigan	L 62–65 ^{OT}	13–18 (6–12)	15 – Osojnik	7 – Tied	8 – Lovejoy	McGuirk Arena (2,005); Mount Pleasant, MI
*Non-conference game. ^{#}Rankings from AP Poll. (#) Tournament seedings in parentheses. All times are in Eastern Time.

== Post Season Awards ==
- Tyson Acuff 3rd Team All-MAC
- Arne Osojnik All-MAC Freshman Team
- Yusuf Jihad (Academic All-MAC)
- Feb. 19, 2024 Tyson Acuff (MAC Player of the Week)
