= 2023–24 Southern Miss Golden Eagles basketball team =

American college basketball season

2023–24 Southern Miss Golden Eagles basketball
- Conference: Sun Belt Conference
- Record: 16–16 (9–9 Sun Belt)
- Head coach: Jay Ladner (5th season)
- Assistant coaches: Juan Cardona; Nick Williams; Isaiah Carson
- Home arena: Reed Green Coliseum

2023–24 Sun Belt Conference men's basketball standings
	Conf.				Overall
Team	W		L	PCT	W		L	PCT
Appalachian State	16	–	2	.889	27	–	7	.794
James Madison †	15	–	3	.833	32	–	4	.889
Troy	13	–	5	.722	20	–	12	.625
Arkansas State	11	–	7	.611	20	–	17	.541
Louisiana	10	–	8	.556	19	–	14	.576
Southern Miss	9	–	9	.500	16	–	16	.500
Georgia State	8	–	10	.444	14	–	17	.452
South Alabama	8	–	10	.444	16	–	16	.500
Georgia Southern	8	–	10	.444	9	–	24	.273
Marshall	7	–	11	.389	13	–	20	.394
Texas State	7	–	11	.389	17	–	18	.486
Louisiana–Monroe	6	–	12	.333	11	–	19	.367
Coastal Carolina	5	–	13	.278	9	–	22	.290
Old Dominion	3	–	15	.167	7	–	25	.219
† 2024 Sun Belt tournament winner

The 2023–24 Southern Miss Golden Eagles basketball team represented the University of Southern Mississippi during the 2023–24 NCAA Division I men's basketball season. The team, led by fifth-year head coach Jay Ladner, played their home games at Reed Green Coliseum in Hattiesburg, Mississippi as second-year members of the Sun Belt Conference. They finished the season 16–16, 9–9 in Sun Belt play, to finish in sixth place. As the No. 6 seed in the Sun Belt tournament, they lost to Texas State in the second round.

== Previous season ==
The Golden Eagles finished the 2022–23 season 25–8, 14–4 in Sun Belt play, to finish first in the conference. They would lose to South Alabama in the first round of the Sun Belt tournament.

== Preseason ==
=== Preseason Sun Belt Conference poll ===
The Golden Eagles were picked to finish in fourth place in the conference's preseason poll. Senior guard Austin Crowley was named the preseason player of the year. Senior guard Austin Crowley was named to the preseason All-SBC First Team.

Coaches poll
Predicted finish	Team (1st-place votes)
1	James Madison – 176 (7)
2	App State – 159 (2)
3	Old Dominion – 154 (1)
4	Southern Miss – 148
5	Louisiana – 136 (2)
6	South Alabama – 129 (2)
7	Marshall – 119
8	Troy – 91
9	Arkansas State – 84
10	Texas State – 72
11	Georgia State – 69
12	Coastal Carolina – 59
13	Georgia Southern – 42
14	ULM – 32

== Roster ==
2023–24 Southern Miss Golden Eagles men's basketball team
Players
Coaches

Pos.	#	Name	Height	Weight	Year	Previous school	Hometown
F	0	Victor Iwuakor	6 ft 8 in (2.03 m)	205 lb (93 kg)	Sr	Oklahoma; UNLV	Abuja, Nigeria
G	1	Austin Crowley	6 ft 5 in (1.96 m)	184 lb (83 kg)	Sr	Ole Miss	West Point, MS
F	2	Victor Hart	6 ft 6 in (1.98 m)	203 lb (92 kg)	Sr	FIU	Miami, FL
G	3	Mo Arnold	6 ft 1 in (1.85 m)	187 lb (85 kg)	Sr	Jacksonville	Picayune, MS
G	4	Luke Ladner	6 ft 1 in (1.85 m)	194 lb (88 kg)	GS	Loyola (New Orleans)	Kiln, MS
G	10	Cobie Montgomery	6 ft 4 in (1.93 m)	194 lb (88 kg)	RS Jr	Triton College	Louisville, KY
G	11	André Curbelo	6 ft 0 in (1.83 m)	167 lb (76 kg)	Sr	Long Island Lutheran (NY); Illinois; St. John's	Vega Baja, PR
G	12	Neftali Alvarez	6 ft 0 in (1.83 m)	195 lb (88 kg)	GS	Mercer	Cataño, PR
G	14	Trey Alfonso (W)	6 ft 1 in (1.85 m)	178 lb (81 kg)	Jr	Fontainebleau HS	Chalmette, LA
G	15	Donavan Ivory	6 ft 6 in (1.98 m)	193 lb (88 kg)	Sr	Green Bay	Kaukauna, WI
G	20	Jeffery Armstrong	5 ft 11 in (1.8 m)	172 lb (78 kg)	RS Jr	Massanutten Military Academy	Rainsville, AL
C	22	Tegra Izay	7 ft 0 in (2.13 m)	269 lb (122 kg)	RS Jr	La Salle; Harcum College	Montreal, QC
G	23	Jose Benitez	6 ft 0 in (1.83 m)	182 lb (83 kg)	So	Francis Marion	Santo Domingo, Dominican Republic
F	24	Bryson Hall	6 ft 6 in (1.98 m)	225 lb (102 kg)	Jr	Delta State; Wallace State	Northport, AL
C	30	Lieb Yat	7 ft 0 in (2.13 m)	250 lb (113 kg)	Jr	Dawson CC; Seminole State College	Melbourne, Australia
G	55	Tate Ryder (W)	6 ft 0 in (1.83 m)	163 lb (74 kg)	Sr	East Central CC	Oak Grove, MS

Head coach

- Jay Ladner (Southern Miss)

Assistant coach(es)

- Juan Cardona (Middle Georgia State)
- Nick Williams (Mississippi)
- Isaiah Carson (Valley Forge)

Legend

- (C) Team captain
- (S) Suspended
- (I) Ineligible
- (W) Walk-on
- Injured
- Current redshirt

Roster
Last update: November 18, 2023

== Schedule and results ==
Date time, TV	Rank^{#}	Opponent^{#}	Result	Record	High points	High rebounds	High assists	Site (attendance) city, state
Exhibition
October 24, 2023*; 7:00 p.m.		Delta State	W 101–65		–	–	–	Reed Green Coliseum; Hattiesburg, MS
October 29, 2023*; 2:00 p.m.		Mississippi State; Charity exhibition game	L 54–60		–	–	–	Reed Green Coliseum; Hattiesburg, MS
Non-conference regular season
November 6, 2023*; 7:30 p.m., ESPN+		William Carey	W 64–42	1–0	19 – Crowley	10 – Crowley	3 – Crowley	Reed Green Coliseum (4,360); Hattiesburg, MS
November 10, 2023*; 7:00 p.m., ESPN+		at Akron; MAC–SBC Challenge	L 54–72	1–2	17 – Crowley	7 – Arnold	7 – Arnold	James A. Rhodes Arena (2,432); Akron, OH
November 15, 2023*; 7:30 p.m.		Xavier (LA)	W 76–45	2–1	11 – tied	7 – Montgomery	5 – Crowley	Reed Green Coliseum (4,094); Hattiesburg, MS
November 19, 2023*; 12:00p.m., PassThaBall Live		vs. Utah Valley; Jacksonville Classic semifinals	L 65–67	2–2	18 – Hart	5 – tied	4 – Crowley	Flagler Gymnasium (311); St. Augustine, FL
November 20, 2023*; 12:00p.m., PassThaBall Live		vs. Cal State Fullerton; Jacksonville Classic consolation	L 67–74	2–3	13 – Hart	10 – Izay	4 – Crowley	Flagler Gymnasium (221); St. Augustine, FL
November 22, 2023*; 7:00p.m., ESPN+		South Dakota State	L 54–65	2–4	18 – Crowley	10 – Hart	2 – tied	Reed Green Coliseum (3,945); Hattiesburg, MS
November 25, 2023*; 1:30 p.m., ESPN+		at Milwaukee	W 90–84	3–4	32 – Ivory	11 – Izat	4 – Crowley	Klotsche Center (1,695); Milwaukee, WI
December 1, 2023*; 7:00 p.m., ESPN+		at UAB	W 85–82	4–4	26 – Hart	11 – Iwuako	6 – Crowley	Bartow Arena (3,336); Birmingham, AL
December 9, 2023*; 2:00 p.m., ESPN+		Northwestern State	W 83–74	5–4	18 – Iwuako	12 – Hart	7 – Crowley	Reed Green Coliseum (3,699); Hattiesburg, MS
December 13, 2023*; 7:00 p.m., ESPN+		at McNeese	L 48–67	5–5	12 – tied	14 – Izay	3 – tied	The Legacy Center (3,494); Lake Charles, LA
December 18, 2023*; 7:00 p.m., ESPN+		at Lamar	W 82–79	6–5	22 – Crowley	9 – Izay	6 – tied	Neches Arena (1,122); Beaumont, TX
December 23, 2023*; 1:00 p.m.		vs. No. 25 Ole Miss	L 72–89	6–6	15 – Montgomery	11 – Hart	2 – tied	Mississippi Coast Coliseum; Biloxi, MS
Sun Belt Conference regular season
December 30, 2023*; 2:00 p.m., ESPN+		at Georgia Southern	L 67–88	6–7 (0–1)	18 – Curbelo	7 – Curbelo	3 – Curbelo	Hanner Fieldhouse (1,208); Statesboro, GA
January 4, 2024; 7:00 p.m., ESPN+		Georgia State	W 79–73	7–7 (1–1)	25 – Crowley	10 – Curbelo	11 – Curbelo	Reed Green Coliseum (3,733); Hattiesburg, MS
January 6, 2024; 2:00 p.m., ESPN+		No. 19 James Madison	W 81–71	8–7 (2–1)	16 – Hart	8 – Crowley	9 – Curbelo	Reed Green Coliseum (4,107); Hattiesburg, MS
January 11, 2024; 7:30 p.m., ESPN+		at Louisiana–Monroe	W 71–58	9–7 (3–1)	22 – Ivory	14 – Hart	3 – tied	Fant-Ewing Coliseum (1,249); Monroe, LA
January 13, 2024; 4:00 p.m., ESPN+		at Troy	L 56–82	9–8 (3–2)	14 – Crowley	6 – tied	3 – tied	Trojan Arena (4,121); Troy, AL
January 17, 2024; 7:00 p.m., ESPN+		Arkansas State	W 69–66	10–8 (4–2)	25 – Crowley	11 – Arnold	3 – Crowley	Reed Green Coliseum (4,583); Hattiesburg, MS
January 20, 2024; 2:00 p.m., ESPN+		Troy	W 64–63	11–8 (5–2)	20 – Ivory	8 – Iwuakor	5 – Crowley	Reed Green Coliseum (5,587); Hattiesburg, MS
January 24, 2024; 6:00 p.m., ESPN+		at Coastal Carolina	W 79–63	12–8 (6–2)	28 – Ivory	8 – Montgomery	7 – tied	HTC Center (1,489); Conway, SC
January 27, 2024; 6:00 p.m., ESPN+		at Marshall	L 67–83	12–9 (6–3)	18 – Crowley	8 – Ivory	5 – Ivory	Cam Henderson Center (4,697); Huntington, WV
January 31, 2024; 6:00 p.m., ESPN+		at Arkansas State	L 71–78	12–10 (6–4)	17 – tied	12 – Iwuakor	3 – tied	First National Bank Arena (2,032); Jonesboro, AR
February 3, 2024; 4:15 p.m., ESPN+		at Texas State	L 55–60	12–11 (6–5)	16 – Crowley	7 – Iwuakor	2 – tied	Strahan Arena (1,907); San Marcos, TX
February 7, 2024; 7:00 p.m., ESPN+		Old Dominion	W 78–73	13–11 (7–5)	30 – Crowley	11 – tied	4 – Arnold	Reed Green Coliseum (3,927); Hattiesburg, MS
February 10, 2024*; 2:00 p.m., ESPN+		Western Michigan; MAC–SBC Challenge	W 86–54	14–11	31 – Iwuakor	13 – Iwuakor	10 – Crowley	Reed Green Coliseum (3,842); Hattiesburg, MS
February 15, 2024; 7:30 p.m., ESPN+		Louisiana-Monroe	L 59–68	14–12 (7–6)	22 – Crowley	10 – Crowley	4 – Armstrong	Reed Green Coliseum (4,247); Hattiesburg, MS
February 17, 2024; 2:30 p.m., ESPN+		Texas State	W 78–74	15–12 (8–6)	24 – Curbelo	6 – tied	5 – Crowley	Reed Green Coliseum (4,425); Hattiesburg, MS
February 22, 2024; 7:00 p.m., ESPN+		South Alabama	L 64–83	15–13 (8–7)	14 – Montgomery	12 – Hart	3 – Arnold	Reed Green Coliseum (4,202); Hattiesburg, MS
February 24, 2024; 2:00 p.m., ESPN+		Louisiana	W 82–71	16–13 (9–7)	24 – Curbelo	11 – Iwuakor	4 – Crowley	Reed Green Coliseum (4,845); Hattiesburg, MS
February 28, 2024; 7:00 p.m., ESPN+		at South Alabama	L 70–73	16–14 (9–8)	25 – Curbelo	9 – Iwuakor	3 – Crowley	Mitchell Center (2,253); Mobile, AL
March 1, 2024; 7:00 p.m., ESPN+		at Louisiana	L 61–77	16–15 (9–9)	18 – Iwuakor	10 – Iwuakor	3 – Arnold	Cajundome (5,011); Lafayette, LA
Sun Belt Conference tournament
March 7, 2024; 5:00 p.m., ESPN+	(6)	vs. (11) Texas State; Second round	L 59–75	16–16	20 – Hart	9 – Hart	7 – Curbelo	Pensacola Bay Center (987); Pensacola, FL
*Non-conference game. ^{#}Rankings from AP poll. (#) Tournament seedings in parentheses. All times are in Central.
