= 2023–24 Louisiana Ragin' Cajuns men's basketball team =

American college basketball season

2023–24 Louisiana Ragin' Cajuns men's basketball
- Conference: Sun Belt Conference
- Record: 19–14 (10–8 Sun Belt)
- Head coach: Bob Marlin (14th season)
- Assistant coaches: Derrick Zimmerman; Casey Perrin; Neil Hardin; Phillip Shumpert
- Home arena: Cajundome

2023–24 Sun Belt Conference men's basketball standings
	Conf.				Overall
Team	W		L	PCT	W		L	PCT
Appalachian State	16	–	2	.889	27	–	7	.794
James Madison †	15	–	3	.833	32	–	4	.889
Troy	13	–	5	.722	20	–	12	.625
Arkansas State	11	–	7	.611	20	–	17	.541
Louisiana	10	–	8	.556	19	–	14	.576
Southern Miss	9	–	9	.500	16	–	16	.500
Georgia State	8	–	10	.444	14	–	17	.452
South Alabama	8	–	10	.444	16	–	16	.500
Georgia Southern	8	–	10	.444	9	–	24	.273
Marshall	7	–	11	.389	13	–	20	.394
Texas State	7	–	11	.389	17	–	18	.486
Louisiana–Monroe	6	–	12	.333	11	–	19	.367
Coastal Carolina	5	–	13	.278	9	–	22	.290
Old Dominion	3	–	15	.167	7	–	25	.219
† 2024 Sun Belt tournament winner

The 2023–24 Louisiana Ragin' Cajuns men's basketball team represented the University of Louisiana at Lafayette during the 2023–24 NCAA Division I men's basketball season. The Ragin' Cajuns, led by 14th-year head coach Bob Marlin, played their home games at the Cajundome as members of the Sun Belt Conference. They finished the season 19–14, 10–8 in Sun Belt play to finish in fifth place. As the No. 5 seed in the Sun Belt tournament, they defeated Coastal Carolina in the second round, before losing to Arkansas State in the quarterfinals.

== Previous season ==
The Ragin' Cajuns finished the 2021–22 season 26–8, 13–5 in Sun Belt play to finish in a tie for second place. As the No. 2 seed in the Sun Belt tournament, they defeated Georgia Southern, Texas State, and South Alabama to win the tournament championship. As a result, they received the conference's automatic bid to the NCAA tournament as the No. 13 seed in the East region. Then they lost to Tennessee in the first round.

== Preseason ==
=== Preseason Sun Belt Conference poll ===
The Ragin' Cajuns were picked to finish in fifth place in the conference's preseason poll. Redshirt junior Themus Fulks was named to the preseason All-SBC First Team.

Coaches poll
Predicted finish	Team (1st place Votes)
1	James Madison - 176 (7)
2	App State - 159 (2)
3	Old Dominion - 154 (1)
4	Southern Miss - 148
5	Louisiana - 136 (2)
6	South Alabama - 129 (2)
7	Marshall - 119
8	Troy - 91
9	Arkansas State - 84
10	Texas State - 72
11	Georgia State - 69
12	Coastal Carolina - 59
13	Georgia Southern - 42
14	ULM - 32

== Roster ==
2023–24 Louisiana Ragin' Cajuns men's basketball team
Players
Coaches

Pos.	#	Name	Height	Weight	Year	Previous school	Hometown
G	0	Themus Fulks	6 ft 1 in (1.85 m)	175 lb (79 kg)	RS Jr	North Davidson HS; Dodge CC	Winston-Salem, North Carolina
F	1	Joe Charles	6 ft 7 in (2.01 m)	195 lb (88 kg)	Jr	Carencro HS	Carencro, Louisiana
G	2	Michael Thomas	6 ft 1 in (1.85 m)	160 lb (73 kg)	Jr	Hamilton Christian	Lake Charles, Louisiana
G	3	Chancellor White	6 ft 6 in (1.98 m)	185 lb (84 kg)	So	Foster HS	Richmond, Texas
F	4	Kobe Julien	6 ft 6 in (1.98 m)	215 lb (98 kg)	RS Jr	Madison Preparatory	Baton Rouge, Louisiana
G	5	London Fields	6 ft 4 in (1.93 m)	185 lb (84 kg)	Fr	Tupelo HS	Tupelo, Mississippi
G	10	Blake Butler	6 ft 5 in (1.96 m)	210 lb (95 kg)	Jr	Jeffersontown HS; East Mississippi CC	Louisville, Kentucky
G	11	Isaiah Crawford (W)	6 ft 3 in (1.91 m)	175 lb (79 kg)	RS Fr	Archbishop Shaw HS	New Orleans, Louisiana
G	12	Giovanni Nannucci	6 ft 4 in (1.93 m)	195 lb (88 kg)	Fr	South Guilford HS	Greensboro, North Carolina
G	13	Brandon Hardy	6 ft 3 in (1.91 m)	190 lb (86 kg)	Fr	Zachary HS	Zachary, Louisiana
G	20	Christian Landry	6 ft 5 in (1.96 m)	190 lb (86 kg)	Fr	St. Thomas More HS	Lafayette, Louisiana
G	22	Kentrell Garnett	6 ft 1 in (1.85 m)	165 lb (75 kg)	Jr	Catholic HS	Donaldsonville, Louisiana
F	23	Kyran Ratliff	6 ft 8 in (2.03 m)	205 lb (93 kg)	RS Fr	Booker T. Washington HS; Shaun Dumas Academy	New Orleans, Louisiana
G	30	Vinny Sigona	6 ft 1 in (1.85 m)	165 lb (75 kg)	So	Prestonwood Christian Academy	Plano, Texas
F	34	Hosana Kitenge	6 ft 8 in (2.03 m)	270 lb (122 kg)	Jr	Charnwood College; Three Rivers CC	Crawley, England

Head coach

- Bob Marlin (Mississippi State)

Assistant coach(es)

- Derrick Zimmerman (Mississippi State)
- Casey Perrin (Campbell)
- Neil Hardin (West Florida)
- Phillip Shumpert (US Sports Academy)

Legend

- (C) Team captain
- (S) Suspended
- (I) Ineligible
- (W) Walk-on
- Injured
- Current redshirt

Roster
Last update: 17 November 2023

== Schedule and results ==
Date time, TV	Rank^{#}	Opponent^{#}	Result	Record	High points	High rebounds	High assists	Site (attendance) city, state
Exhibition
October 30, 2023*; 7:00 p.m.		UT Tyler	W 80–57		–	–	–	Cajundome; Lafayette, LA
Non-conference regular season
November 6, 2023*; 7:30 p.m., ESPN+		Youngstown State	W 72–62	1–0	20 – Fulks	10 – Charles	7 – Fulks	Cajundome (2,078); Lafayette, LA
November 11, 2023*; 6:00 p.m., ESPN+		at Toledo; MAC-SBC Challenge	L 78–87	1–1	25 – Fulks	10 – Charles	5 – Fulks	Savage Arena (4,290); Toledo, OH
November 15, 2023*; 7:00 p.m., ESPN+		Louisiana Christian	W 107–56	2–1	20 – Garnett	11 – Ratliff	7 – Fulks	Cajundome (1,849); Lafayette, LA
November 20, 2023*; 4:00 p.m., FloHoops		vs. Wright State; Gulf Coast Showcase quarterfinals	L 85–91	2–2	23 – Charles	9 – Charles	3 – Fulks	Hertz Arena (213); Estero, FL
November 21, 2023*; 12:30 p.m., FloHoops		vs. Buffalo; Gulf Coast Showcase Consolation 2nd round	W 68–60	3–2	30 – Julien	10 – Charles	3 – Thomas	Hertz Arena (231); Estero, FL
November 22, 2023*; 12:30 p.m., FloHoops		vs. Long Beach State; Gulf Coast Showcase 5th place game	W 92–82	4–2	20 – Butler	10 – Charles	5 – Thomas	Hertz Arena (176); Estero, FL
November 27, 2023*; 7:30 p.m., ESPN+		Loyola New Orleans	W 78–54	5–2	19 – Julien	7 – Kitenge	3 – Ratliff	Cajundome (1,565); Lafayette, LA
November 30, 2023*; 6:30 p.m., ESPN+		at Samford	L 65–88	5–3	29 – Julien	6 – Julien	4 – Fulks	Pete Hanna Center (1,471); Homewood, AL
December 9, 2023*; 2:00 p.m., ESPN+		at Louisiana Tech	L 67–72	5–4	26 – Julien	9 – Julien	6 – Fulks	Thomas Assembly Center (2,474); Ruston, LA
December 13, 2023*; 7:30 p.m., ESPN+		Eastern Kentucky	W 73–62	6–4	21 – Fulks	10 – Charles	4 – Fulks	Cajundome (1,417); Lafayette, LA
December 17, 2023*; 3:00 p.m., ESPN+		at McNeese	L 72–74	6–5	19 – Garnett	8 – Charles	4 – Fulks	The Legacy Center (4,300); Lake Charles, LA
December 22, 2023*; 7:00 p.m., ESPN+		at Rice	W 84–67	7–5	19 – Julien	16 – Charles	5 – Fulks	Tudor Fieldhouse (2,232); Houston, TX
Sun Belt Conference regular season
December 30, 2023; 3:00 p.m., ESPN+		at Marshall	L 61–75	7–6 (0–1)	11 – Tied	13 – Charles	2 – Fulks	Cam Henderson Center (4,248); Huntington, WV
January 4, 2024; 7:00 p.m., ESPN+		No. 19 James Madison	L 61–68	7–7 (0–2)	17 – Garnett	15 – Charles	3 – Fulks	Cajundome (2,349); Lafayette, LA
January 6, 2024; 7:00 p.m., ESPN+		Coastal Carolina	W 85–77	8–7 (1–2)	22 – Charles	14 – Charles	6 – Fulks	Cajundome (2,383); Lafayette, LA
January 10, 2024; 7:30 p.m., ESPN+		at Troy	L 73–79	8–8 (1–3)	20 – Julien	9 – Kitenge	4 – Fulks	Trojan Arena (2,798); Troy, AL
January 13, 2024; 2:30 p.m., ESPN+		at Arkansas State	W 84–77	9–8 (2–3)	25 – Kitenge	7 – Kitenge	7 – Fulks	First National Bank Arena (2,681); Jonesboro, AR
January 17, 2024; 7:00 p.m., ESPN+		at Texas State	W 86–68	10–8 (3–3)	18 – Julien	10 – Charles	10 – Fulks	Strahan Arena (2,858); San Marcos, TX
January 20, 2024; 3:00 p.m., ESPN+		at South Alabama	W 88–79	11–8 (4–3)	24 – Julien	11 – Kitenge	4 – Fulks	Mitchell Center (2,991); Mobile, AL
January 26, 2024; 4:00 p.m., ESPN+		Arkansas State; Rescheduled from January 25th	W 81–75	12–8 (5–3)	21 – Julien	10 – Charles	5 – Fulks	Cajundome (1,874); Lafayette, LA
January 28, 2024; 12:00 p.m., ESPN+		Texas State	W 66–46	13–8 (6–3)	23 – Fulks	13 – Charles	3 – Garnett	Cajundome (1,392); Lafayette, LA
January 31, 2024; 7:00 p.m., ESPN+		Louisiana–Monroe	W 80–72	14–8 (7–3)	19 – Tied	11 – Charles	4 – Fulks	Cajundome (1,668); Lafayette, LA
February 3, 2024; 7:00 p.m., ESPN+		South Alabama	W 80–60	15–8 (8–3)	18 – Kitenge	15 – Charles	3 – Tied	Cajundome (1,873); Lafayette, LA
February 7, 2024; 7:00 p.m., ESPN+		Georgia State	L 69–78	15–9 (8–4)	28 – Julien	11 – Charles	4 – Fulks	Cajundome (1,613); Lafayette, LA
February 11, 2024*; 2:00 p.m., ESPN+		Bowling Green; MAC-SBC Challenge	W 86–60	16–9	17 – Fulks	10 – Kitenge	3 – Tied	Cajundome (914); Lafayette, LA
February 15, 2024; 6:00 p.m., ESPN+		at Old Dominion	W 68–60	17–9 (9–4)	14 – Julien	17 – Kitenge	6 – Fulks	Chartway Arena (5,265); Norfolk, VA
February 17, 2024; 3:00 p.m., ESPN+		at Appalachian State	L 73–85	17–10 (9–5)	23 – Kitenge	13 – Kitenge	4 – Fulks	Holmes Center (6,587); Boone, NC
February 22, 2024; 7:30 p.m., ESPN+		at Louisiana–Monroe	L 59–66	17–11 (9–6)	16 – Kitenge	16 – Charles	4 – Fulks	Fant–Ewing Coliseum (1,467); Monroe, LA
February 24, 2024; 2:00 p.m., ESPN+		at Southern Miss	L 71–82	17–12 (9–7)	26 – Charles	7 – Charles	6 – Fulks	Reed Green Coliseum (4,845); Hattiesburg, MS
February 28, 2024; 7:00 p.m., ESPN+		Troy	L 73–87	17–13 (9–8)	21 – Julien	8 – Charles	2 – Kitenge	Cajundome (1,418); Lafayette, LA
March 1, 2024; 7:30 p.m., ESPN+		Southern Miss	W 77–61	18–13 (10–8)	16 – Charles	14 – Charles	3 – Tied	Cajundome (5,011); Lafayette, LA
Sun Belt tournament
March 7, 2024; 2:00 p.m., ESPN+	(5)	vs. (13) Coastal Carolina; Second round	W 80–66	19–13	25 – Julien	10 – Charles	4 – Tied	Pensacola Bay Center (882); Pensacola, FL
March 9, 2024; 2:00 p.m., ESPN+	(5)	vs. (4) Arkansas State; Quarterfinals	L 62–89	19–14	15 – Tied	6 – Charles	2 – Thomas	Pensacola Bay Center (2,059); Pensacola, FL
*Non-conference game. ^{#}Rankings from AP Poll. (#) Tournament seedings in parentheses. E=East. All times are in Central Time.
