= 2023–24 Texas State Bobcats men's basketball team =

American college basketball season

2023–24 Texas State Bobcats men's basketball
- Conference: Sun Belt Conference
- Record: 17–18 (7–11 Sun Belt)
- Head coach: Terrence Johnson (4th season)
- Associate head coach: Bennie Seltzer
- Assistant coaches: Donte Mathis; Jay Smith; Aaron Proctor
- Home arena: Strahan Arena

2023–24 Sun Belt Conference men's basketball standings
	Conf.				Overall
Team	W		L	PCT	W		L	PCT
Appalachian State	16	–	2	.889	27	–	7	.794
James Madison †	15	–	3	.833	32	–	4	.889
Troy	13	–	5	.722	20	–	12	.625
Arkansas State	11	–	7	.611	20	–	17	.541
Louisiana	10	–	8	.556	19	–	14	.576
Southern Miss	9	–	9	.500	16	–	16	.500
Georgia State	8	–	10	.444	14	–	17	.452
South Alabama	8	–	10	.444	16	–	16	.500
Georgia Southern	8	–	10	.444	9	–	24	.273
Marshall	7	–	11	.389	13	–	20	.394
Texas State	7	–	11	.389	17	–	18	.486
Louisiana–Monroe	6	–	12	.333	11	–	19	.367
Coastal Carolina	5	–	13	.278	9	–	22	.290
Old Dominion	3	–	15	.167	7	–	25	.219
† 2024 Sun Belt tournament winner

The 2023–24 Texas State Bobcats men's basketball team represented Texas State University in the 2023–24 NCAA Division I men's basketball season. The Bobcats, led by fourth-year head coach Terrence Johnson, played their home games at Strahan Arena in San Marcos, Texas as members of the Sun Belt Conference. They finished the season 17–18, 7–11 in Sun Belt play, to finish in a tie for tenth place. As the No. 11 seed in the Sun Belt tournament, they defeated Old Dominion in the first round, Southern Miss in the second round, and Troy in the quarterfinals, before losing to James Madison in the semifinals.

== Previous season ==
The Bobcats finished the 2022–23 season 16–19, 6–12 in Sun Belt play, to finish in eleventh place. The Bobcats beat Georgia State in the first round, Old Dominion in the second round, and Marshall in the quarterfinals, before losing to Louisiana in the semifinals of the Sun Belt Conference tournament.

== Offseason ==
=== Recruiting classes ===
==== 2023 recruiting class ====
College recruiting information
Name	Hometown	School	Height	Weight	Commit date
Kaden Gumbs; PG	San Marcos, TX	San Marcos High School	6 ft 1 in (1.85 m)	165 lb (75 kg)	May 11, 2022
Kaden Gumbs; PG	Recruit ratings: 247Sports:				
Overall recruit ranking:
Note: In many cases, Scout, Rivals, 247Sports, On3, and ESPN may conflict in their listings of height and weight.; In these cases, the average was taken. ESPN grades are on a 100-point scale.; Sources: "2023 Team Ranking". Rivals.

== Preseason ==
=== Preseason Sun Belt Conference poll ===
The Bobcats were picked to finish in tenth place in the conference's preseason poll.

Coaches poll
Predicted finish	Team (1st-place votes)
1	James Madison – 176 (7)
2	App State – 159 (2)
3	Old Dominion – 154 (1)
4	Southern Miss – 148
5	Louisiana – 136 (2)
6	South Alabama – 129 (2)
7	Marshall – 119
8	Troy – 91
9	Arkansas State – 84
10	Texas State – 72
11	Georgia State – 69
12	Coastal Carolina – 59
13	Georgia Southern – 42
14	ULM – 32

== Roster ==
2023–24 Texas State Bobcats men's basketball team
Players
Coaches

Pos.	#	Name	Height	Weight	Year	Previous school	Hometown
G	0	Dylan Dawson	6 ft 3 in (1.91 m)	180 lb (82 kg)	Sr	Atascocita High School	Humble, TX
F	1	Tyrel Morgan	6 ft 5 in (1.96 m)	185 lb (84 kg)	Sr	Northern Oklahoma College–Tonkawa	Atlanta, GA
G	2	Dontae Horne	6 ft 4 in (1.93 m)	190 lb (86 kg)	Jr	Howard College	Memphis, TN
F	4	Davion Sykes	6 ft 6 in (1.98 m)	200 lb (91 kg)	So	Duncanville High School	Duncanville, TX
G	5	Jordan Mason	6 ft 4 in (1.93 m)	175 lb (79 kg)	So	Tom C. Clark High School	San Antonio, TX
G	11	Kaden Gumbs	6 ft 2 in (1.88 m)	179 lb (81 kg)	Fr	San Marcos High School	San Marcos, TX
G	15	Elijah Tate	6 ft 4 in (1.93 m)	190 lb (86 kg)	Jr	South Plains College	Baton Rouge, LA
G	22	Coleton Benson	6 ft 1 in (1.85 m)	170 lb (77 kg)	So	Army	Austin, TX
G	23	Joshua O'Garro	6 ft 6 in (1.98 m)	175 lb (79 kg)	Jr	Colby Community College	George Town, Cayman Islands
F	24	Brandon Love	6 ft 9 in (2.06 m)	208 lb (94 kg)	Jr	George Bush High School	Houston, TX
F	25	Chris Nix	6 ft 9 in (2.06 m)	235 lb (107 kg)	Sr	UT Martin	Nashville, TN
F	30	Christian Turner	6 ft 7 in (2.01 m)	220 lb (100 kg)	Jr	Troy	Grand Prairie, TX
F	34	Ryan Bolton	6 ft 10 in (2.08 m)	255 lb (116 kg)	Fr	Legacy School of Sport Sciences	Waller, TX
G	55	Drue Drinnon	6 ft 1 in (1.85 m)	180 lb (82 kg)	GS	Navarro College	Smyrna, GA

Head coach

- Terrence Johnson (Southern)

Assistant coach(es)

- Bennie Seltzer (Washington State)
- Donte Mathis (Texas State)
- Jay Smith (LSU–Alexandria)
- Aaron Proctor (Cal State San Bernardino)

Legend

- (C) Team captain
- (S) Suspended
- (I) Ineligible
- (W) Walk-on
- Injured
- Current redshirt

Roster
Last update: December 9, 2023

== Schedule and results ==
Date time, TV	Rank^{#}	Opponent^{#}	Result	Record	High points	High rebounds	High assists	Site (attendance) city, state
Non-conference regular season
November 6, 2023*; 7:00 p.m., ESPN+		at Little Rock	L 66–71	0–1	15 – O'Garro	10 – Love	4 – Horne	Jack Stephens Center (2,146); Little Rock, AR
November 11, 2023*; 10:00 a.m., ESPN+		at Miami (OH); MAC–SBC Challenge	W 75–65	1–1	19 – Morgan	8 – Morgan	3 – 3 tied	Millett Hall (1,636); Oxford, OH
November 14, 2023*; 7:00 p.m., ESPN+		at Oklahoma	L 54–93	1–2	13 – Dawson	6 – 2 tied	5 – Gumbs	Lloyd Noble Center (4,859); Norman, OK
November 17, 2023*; 7:15 p.m., ESPN+		UTSA; I-35 Rivalry	W 72–62	2–2	19 – Turner	14 – Love	3 – Gumbs	Strahan Arena (1,801); San Marcos, TX
November 21, 2023*; 12:00 p.m.		vs. McNeese; Louisiana Tech MTE	L 48–59	2–3	13 – Gumbs	9 – O'Garro	3 – Gumbs	Thomas Assembly Center (132); Ruston, LA
November 22, 2023*; 12:00 p.m.		vs. Southern Utah; Louisiana Tech MTE	L 67–74	2–4	15 – Gumbs	10 – Gumbs	4 – Gumbs	Thomas Assembly Center (103); Ruston, LA
November 25, 2023*; 2:00 p.m., ESPN+		at UT Arlington	W 73–66	3–4	21 – Mason	10 – Love	8 – Gumbs	College Park Center (1,280); Arlington, TX
November 30, 2023*; 8:00 p.m., LHN		at No. 16 Texas	L 58–77	3–5	15 – Dawson	6 – Turner	2 – Mason	Moody Center (10,533); Austin, TX
December 11, 2023*; 7:00 p.m., ESPN+		Jarvis Christian	W 107–58	4–5	20 – Mason	9 – Nix	6 – 2 tied	Strahan Arena (1,008); San Marcos, TX
December 15, 2023*; 6:30 p.m., ESPN+		at Sam Houston	W 73–60	5–5	23 – Dawson	8 – Turner	6 – Gumbs	Bernard Johnson Coliseum (714); Huntsville, TX
December 18, 2023*; 7:00 p.m., ESPN+		LeTourneau	W 110–68	6–5	21 – Love	7 – 3 tied	8 – Mason	Strahan Arena (1,114); San Marcos, TX
December 21, 2023*; 7:00 p.m., ESPN+		at No. 3 Houston	L 37–72	6–6	7 – Gumbs	8 – Turner	2 – 2 tied	Fertitta Center (7,231); Houston, TX
Sun Belt regular season
December 30, 2023; 1:00 p.m., ESPN+		at No. 20 James Madison	L 65–82	6–7 (0–1)	19 – Benson	7 – Nix	3 – 2 tied	Atlantic Union Bank Center (4,617); Harrisonburg, VA
January 4, 2024; 7:00 p.m., ESPN+		Coastal Carolina	L 63–71	6–8 (0–2)	15 – Benson	7 – Love	6 – Mason	Strahan Arena (1,086); San Marcos, TX
January 6, 2024; 4:00 p.m., ESPN+		Marshall	L 75–79	6–9 (0–3)	23 – Love	9 – Love	7 – Mason	Strahan Arena (1,342); San Marcos, TX
January 11, 2024; 7:30 p.m., ESPN+		at Arkansas State	L 82–85	6–10 (0–4)	19 – Love	7 – Sykes	3 – Gumbs	First National Bank Arena (3,023); Jonesboro, AR
January 13, 2024; 2:30 p.m., ESPN+		at Louisiana–Monroe	W 67–54	7–10 (1–4)	16 – Mason	7 – 2 tied	3 – Mason	Fant–Ewing Coliseum (1,305); Monroe, LA
January 17, 2024; 7:00 p.m., ESPN+		Louisiana	L 68–86	7–11 (1–5)	17 – Gumbs	6 – Nix	4 – Gumbs	Strahan Arena (2,858); San Marcos, TX
January 20, 2024; 4:15 p.m., ESPN+		Arkansas State	L 72–79	7–12 (1–6)	21 – Mason	7 – Gumbs	2 – 4 tied	Strahan Arena (2,042); San Marcos, TX
January 24, 2024; 6:00 p.m., ESPN+		at Troy	L 65–78	7–13 (1–7)	12 – Dawson	7 – Love	3 – Dawson	Trojan Arena (2,248); Troy, AL
January 28, 2024; 12:00 p.m., ESPN+		at Louisiana	L 46–66	7–14 (1–8)	10 – Dawson	4 – 4 tied	2 – 3 tied	Cajundome (1,392); Lafayette, LA
February 1, 2024; 7:00 p.m., ESPN+		South Alabama	W 74–66	8–14 (2–8)	18 – Sykes	11 – Sykes	6 – Gumbs	Strahan Arena (1,699); San Marcos, TX
February 3, 2024; 4:15 p.m., ESPN+		Southern Miss	W 60–55	9–14 (3–8)	15 – Love	14 – Love	3 – Dawson	Strahan Arena (1,907); San Marcos, TX
February 7, 2024; 7:00 p.m., ESPN+		Appalachian State	W 63–56	10–14 (4–8)	17 – Sykes	11 – Sykes	3 – Mason	Strahan Arena (1,498); San Marcos, TX
February 10, 2024*; 4:00 p.m., ESPN+		Ball State; MAC–SBC Challenge	W 68–60	11–14	11 – 2 tied	10 – Sykes	3 – 3 tied	Strahan Arena (1,407); San Marcos, TX
February 15, 2024; 7:00 p.m., ESPN+		at South Alabama	L 55–72	11–15 (4–9)	13 – Love	5 – 3 tied	2 – 2 tied	Mitchell Center (2,151); Mobile, AL
February 17, 2024; 2:30 p.m., ESPN+		at Southern Miss	L 74–78	11–16 (4–10)	18 – Mason	9 – Sykes	2 – 2 tied	Reed Green Coliseum (4,425); Hattiesburg, MS
February 22, 2024; 7:00 p.m., ESPN+		at Georgia Southern	L 76–84	11–17 (4–11)	15 – Dawson	6 – O'Garro	6 – Mason	Hanner Fieldhouse (1,623); Statesboro, GA
February 24, 2024; 1:00 p.m., ESPN+		at Georgia State	W 68–59	12–17 (5–11)	17 – Benson	10 – Sykes	3 – Sykes	GSU Convocation Center (1,992); Atlanta, GA
February 27, 2024; 7:00 p.m., ESPN+		Louisiana–Monroe	W 73–55	13–17 (6–11)	13 – Mason	10 – Sykes	5 – Turner	Strahan Arena (1,219); San Marcos, TX
March 1, 2024; 7:15 p.m., ESPN+		Troy	W 82–79 ^{OT}	14–17 (7–11)	30 – Sykes	12 – Sykes	7 – Horne	Strahan Arena (2,658); San Marcos, TX
Sun Belt tournament
March 5, 2024; 7:30 p.m., ESPN+	(11)	vs. (14) Old Dominion; First round	W 92–83 ^{OT}	15–17	28 – Benson	8 – Sykes	7 – Mason	Pensacola Bay Center (795); Pensacola, FL
March 7, 2024; 5:00 p.m., ESPN+	(11)	vs. (6) Southern Miss; Second round	W 75–59	16–17	20 – Horne	7 – 2 tied	4 – Mason	Pensacola Bay Center (987); Pensacola, FL
March 9, 2024; 5:00 p.m., ESPN+	(11)	vs. (3) Troy; Quarterfinals	W 74–68	17–17	25 – Mason	5 – 2 tied	4 – Sykes	Pensacola Bay Center (2,075); Pensacola, FL
March 10, 2024; 7:30 p.m., ESPN+	(11)	vs. (2) James Madison; Semifinals	L 68–73	17–18	17 – Love	6 – Mason	4 – Horne	Pensacola Bay Center (1,829); Pensacola, FL
*Non-conference game. ^{#}Rankings from AP poll. (#) Tournament seedings in parentheses. All times are in Central.
