= 2023–24 Bowling Green Falcons men's basketball team =

American college basketball season

2023–24 Bowling Green Falcons men's basketball

CIT, quarterfinals
- Conference: Mid-American Conference
- Record: 20–14 (10–8 MAC)
- Head coach: Todd Simon (1st season)
- Assistant coaches: Bryce Martin (1st season); Lourawls Nairn Jr. (1st season); German Srulovich (1st season); Bob Gallager (1st season)
- Home arena: Stroh Center

2023–24 Mid-American Conference men's basketball standings
	Conf.				Overall
Team	W		L	PCT	W		L	PCT
Toledo	14	–	4	.778	20	–	12	.625
Akron †	13	–	5	.722	24	–	11	.686
Ohio	13	–	5	.722	20	–	13	.606
Central Michigan	12	–	6	.667	18	–	14	.563
Bowling Green	10	–	8	.556	20	–	14	.588
Western Michigan	9	–	9	.500	12	–	20	.375
Miami (OH)	9	–	9	.500	15	–	17	.469
Kent State	8	–	10	.444	17	–	17	.500
Ball State	7	–	11	.389	15	–	16	.484
Eastern Michigan	6	–	12	.333	13	–	18	.419
Northern Illinois	5	–	13	.278	11	–	20	.355
Buffalo	2	–	16	.111	4	–	27	.129
† 2024 MAC tournament winner

The 2023–24 Bowling Green Falcons men's basketball team represented Bowling Green State University in the 2023–24 NCAA Division I men's basketball season. The Falcons, led by Todd Simon in his first year as head coach, played their home games at the Stroh Center in Bowling Green, Ohio as members of the Mid-American Conference (MAC). They finished the regular season 19–12, 10–8 in MAC play, to finish in 5th place. They defeated Central Michigan in the first round of the MAC tournament before losing to Kent State in the second round. The Falcons received an invitation to play in the CIT where they were defeated by Purdue Fort Wayne in the opening round, bringing their final record to 20–14.

== Previous season ==
The Falcons finished the 2022–23 season 11–20, 5–13 in MAC play, to finish in a three-way tie for ninth place. They failed to qualify for the MAC tournament. On March 5, 2023, the school fired head coach Michael Huger. On March 15, the school hired Southern Utah's former head coach Todd Simon as the Falcons' new coach.

== Offseason ==
=== Departures ===
Departures
Name	Pos.	Height	Weight	Year	Hometown	Notes
Ubong Abasi Etim	F	6' 9"	210	RS–Freshman	Richmond, CA	Transferred to Central Arkansas
Brenton Mills	G	6' 3"	185	Senior	Allen, TX	Transferred to Vermont
Leon Ayers	G	6' 5"	185	Senior	Troy, MI	Exhausted eligibility
Kaden Metheny	G	5' 11"	180	Sophomore	Morgantown, WV	Transferred to Liberty
Willie Lightfoot	G	6' 0"	170	Freshman	Niagara Falls, NY	Transferred to Odessa College
Isaac Elsasser	G	6' 4"	185	Senior	Bowling Green, OH	
Chandler Turner	G/F	6' 7"	210	Senior	Detroit, MI	Transferred to Radford
Samari Curtis	G	6' 4"	190	Senior	Xenia, OH	
Madini Diarra	F	6' 11"	260	Senior	Bamako, Mali	
Gabe O'Neal	F	6' 7"	240	Senior	Cincinnati, OH	
Jackson Watson	G	6' 1"	180	Sophomore	Libertyville, IL	Entered transfer portal

=== Incoming transfers ===
Transfers
Name	Pos.	Height	Weight	Year	Hometown	Previous school
Marcus Hill	G	6' 4"	185	Junior	Rockford, IL	Southern Union State Community College
Trey Thomas	G	6' 0"	160	Senior	Durham, ON	Vanderbilt
DJ Smith	G	6' 0"	160	Junior	North Little Rock, AR	Little Rock
DaJion Humphrey	G	6' 4"	185	Senior	Detroit, MI	Garden City Community College
PJ Edwards	G	6' 4"	200	Sophomore	Springfield, IL	UCF
Da'Shawn Phillip	G	6' 6"	180	Senior	Baltimore, MD	Maryland Eastern Shore
Jason Spurgin	C	6' 11"	250	Senior	Toowoomba, Australia	Southern Utah
Greg Spurgin	F	6' 7"	210	Sophomore	Toowoomba, Australia	Westminster
JZ Zaher	G	6' 0"	170	Sophomore	Fenton, MI	Eastern Michigan

=== Recruiting class ===
College recruiting
Name	Hometown	School	Height	Weight	Commit date
EJay Greer; G	Lansdowne, PA	Rocktop Academy	6 ft 8 in (2.03 m)	170 lb (77 kg)	
EJay Greer; G	Recruit ratings: Scout: Rivals: 247Sports: (NR)				
Overall recruit ranking:
Note: In many cases, Scout, Rivals, 247Sports, On3, and ESPN may conflict in their listings of height and weight.; In these cases, the average was taken. ESPN grades are on a 100-point scale.; Sources: "2023 Team Ranking". Rivals.

== Roster ==
2023–24 Bowling Green Falcons men's basketball team
Players
Coaches

Pos.	#	Name	Height	Weight	Year	Hometown
G	0	Marcus Hill	6 ft 4 in (1.93 m)	185 lb (84 kg)	Jr	Rockford, IL
G	1	Trey Thomas	6 ft 0 in (1.83 m)	160 lb (73 kg)	Sr	Durham, ON
G	2	DJ Smith	6 ft 0 in (1.83 m)	160 lb (73 kg)	Jr	North Little Rock, AR
G	3	DaJion Humphrey	6 ft 4 in (1.93 m)	185 lb (84 kg)	Sr	Detroit, MI
G	4	PJ Edwards	6 ft 4 in (1.93 m)	200 lb (91 kg)	So	Springfield, IL
G	5	Da'Shawn Phillip	6 ft 5 in (1.96 m)	180 lb (82 kg)	Sr	Baltimore, MD
C	7	Jason Spurgin	7 ft 0 in (2.13 m)	250 lb (113 kg)	Sr	Toowoomba, Australia
F	8	Greg Spurgin	6 ft 7 in (2.01 m)	210 lb (95 kg)	So	Toowoomba, Australia
G	10	Anthony III McComb	6 ft 3 in (1.91 m)	180 lb (82 kg)	So	Dayton, OH
F	11	Jamai Felt	6 ft 10 in (2.08 m)	210 lb (95 kg)	RS Fr	Boston, MA
F	12	Rashaun Agee	6 ft 8 in (2.03 m)	225 lb (102 kg)	Sr	Chicago, IL
G	13	EJay Greer	6 ft 8 in (2.03 m)	170 lb (77 kg)	Fr	Lansdowne, PA
F	14	Sam Towns	6 ft 9 in (2.06 m)	200 lb (91 kg)	Sr	Columbus, OH
G	17	JZ Zaher	6 ft 0 in (1.83 m)	170 lb (77 kg)	So	Fenton, MI

Head coach

- Todd Simon (Central Michigan)

Assistant coach(es)

- Bryce Martin (Boise State)
- Lourawls Nairn Jr. (Michigan State)
- German Srulovich

Legend

- (C) Team captain
- (S) Suspended
- (I) Ineligible
- (W) Walk-on
- Injured
- Current redshirt

Roster
Last update: September 29, 2023

== Schedule and results ==
Date time, TV	Rank^{#}	Opponent^{#}	Result	Record	High points	High rebounds	High assists	Site (attendance) city, state
Non-conference regular season
November 6, 2023*; 7:00 p.m., ESPN+		Chicago State	W 70–41	1–0	18 – Hill	4 – Edwards	10 – Phillip	Stroh Center (1,776); Bowling Green, OH
November 11, 2023*; 12:00 p.m., ESPN+		Arkansas State; MAC–SBC Challenge	W 81–75	2–0	26 – Hill	7 – Towns	4 – Hill	Stroh Center (1,513); Bowling Green, OH
November 14, 2023*; 7:00 p.m., ESPN+		at Oakland	L 62–81	2–1	17 – J. Spurgin	10 – J. Spurgin	3 – Hill	Athletics Center O'rena (2,384); Rochester, MI
November 17, 2023*; 7:00 p.m., ESPN+		Bellarmine	L 67–85	2–2	15 – McComb	6 – tied	4 – J. Spurgin	Stroh Center (1,775); Bowling Green, OH
November 24, 2023*; 7:00 p.m.		vs. Western Kentucky; Northern Classic	L 65–72	2–3	29 – Hill	9 – Phillip	2 – Phillip	Place Bell; Laval, QC
November 25, 2023*; 7:00 p.m.		vs. Lipscomb; Northern Classic	W 82–61	3–3	33 – Hill	9 – Agee	5 – Hill	Place Bell; Montreal, QC
November 26, 2023*; 4:00 p.m.		vs. Canisius; Northern Classic	W 77–73	4–3	26 – Hill	8 – Agee	4 – Hill	Place Bell; Montreal, QC
December 2, 2023*; 4:00 p.m., ESPN+		at Southern Indiana	W 54–52	5–3	15 – Hill	11 – Towns	3 – Thomas	Screaming Eagles Arena (1,539); Evansville, IN
December 10, 2023*; 2:00 p.m., ESPN+		Ohio Dominican	W 97–49	6–3	17 – Agee	12 – Edwards	3 – tied	Stroh Center (1,338); Bowling Green, OH
December 16, 2023*; 2:00 p.m., ESPN+		Kansas City	W 79–69	7–3	29 – Hill	12 – Agee	4 – Thomas	Stroh Center (1,561); Bowling Green, OH
December 19, 2023*; 11:00 a.m., ESPN+		Hampton	W 75–65	8–3	25 – Thomas	12 – Agee	3 – tied	Stroh Center (2,995); Bowling Green, OH
December 22, 2023*; 2:00 p.m., ESPN+		Siena Heights	W 79–58	9–3	19 – Thomas	9 – Agee	3 – tied	Stroh Center (1,117); Bowling Green, OH
MAC regular season
January 2, 2024; 7:00 p.m., ESPN+		Eastern Michigan	W 92–90 ^{OT}	10–3 (1–0)	35 – Hill	11 – Agee	6 – Thomas	Stroh Center (2,439); Bowling Green, OH
January 5, 2024; 9:00 p.m., CBSSN		at Akron	L 67–83	10–4 (1–1)	19 – Hill	6 – Agee	4 – Spurgin	James A. Rhodes Arena (2,394); Akron, OH
January 9, 2024; 7:00 p.m., ESPN+		Ohio	W 83–78	11–4 (2–1)	20 – Thomas	15 – Agee	6 – Agee	Stroh Center (1,982); Bowling Green, OH
January 13, 2024; 4:00 p.m., ESPN+		at Northern Illinois	W 83–72	12–4 (3–1)	24 – Agee	10 – Spurgin	4 – Agee	Convocation Center (1,041); DeKalb, IL
January 16, 2024; 7:00 p.m., ESPN+		at Miami (OH)	W 78–73	13–4 (4–1)	23 – Hill	12 – Agee	3 – tied	Millett Hall (813); Oxford, OH
January 20, 2024; 2:00 p.m., ESPN+		Western Michigan	W 84–79	14–4 (5–1)	28 – Hill	14 – Agee	3 – Thomas	Stroh Center (2,232); Bowling Green, OH
January 23, 2024; 7:00 p.m., ESPN+		Kent State	L 84–90 ^{OT}	14–5 (5–2)	21 – Hill	10 – Agee	3 – Hill	Stroh Center (2,099); Bowling Green, OH
January 27, 2024; 2:00 p.m., ESPN+		at Toledo	L 72–88	14–6 (5–3)	25 – Hill	6 – Phillip	3 – Hill	Savage Arena (7,318); Toledo, OH
January 30, 2024; 7:00 p.m., ESPN+		at Ball State	W 81–72	15–6 (6–3)	28 – Hill	10 – Agee	4 – Thomas	Worthen Arena (3,488); Muncie, IN
February 3, 2024; 5:00 p.m., ESPN+		Central Michigan	L 76–77 ^{2OT}	15–7 (6–4)	22 – Hill	14 – Agee	7 – Hill	Stroh Center (2,230); Bowling Green, OH
February 6, 2024; 7:00 p.m., ESPN+		Buffalo	W 87–73	16–7 (7–4)	27 – Hill	10 – Agee	6 – Thomas	Stroh Center (1,704); Bowling Green, OH
February 11, 2024*; 3:00 p.m., ESPN+		at Louisiana; MAC–SBC Challenge	L 60–86	16–8	22 – Hill	7 – Agee	2 – tied	Cajundome (914); Lafayette, LA
February 17, 2024; 3:30 p.m., ESPN+		at Eastern Michigan	L 60–69	16–9 (7–5)	19 – Hill	13 – Agee	3 – tied	George Gervin GameAbove Center (3,304); Ypsilanti, MI
February 20, 2024; 7:00 p.m., ESPN+		at Central Michigan	L 60–62 ^{OT}	16–10 (7–6)	18 – Agee	11 – tied	2 – Hill	McGuirk Arena (1,525); Mount Pleasant, MI
February 23, 2024; 7:00 p.m., ESPN+		Toledo	W 76–68	17–10 (8–6)	31 – Hill	11 – Agee	2 – Phillip	Stroh Center (4,032); Bowling Green, OH
February 27, 2024; 7:00 p.m., ESPN+		Miami (OH)	L 58–66	17–11 (8–7)	20 – Agee	14 – Agee	3 – tied	Stroh Center (1,825); Bowling Green, OH
March 2, 2024; 2:00 p.m., ESPN+		at Ohio	L 59–66	17–12 (8–8)	17 – Agee	11 – Agee	3 – Spurgin	Convocation Center (6,134); Athens, OH
March 5, 2024; 7:00 p.m., ESPN+		at Western Michigan	W 73–65	18–12 (9–8)	17 – Agee	15 – Agee	5 – Hill	University Arena (1,243); Kalamazoo, MI
March 8, 2024; 7:00 p.m., ESPN+		Ball State	W 80–70	19–12 (10–8)	24 – Hill	7 – Towns	5 – Hill	Stroh Center (1,926); Bowling Green, OH
MAC tournament
March 14, 2024; 1:30 p.m., ESPN+	(5)	vs. (4) Central Michigan; Quarterfinals	W 66–56	20–12	20 – Thomas	17 – Agee	3 – Hill	Rocket Mortgage FieldHouse; Cleveland, OH
March 15, 2024; 5:00 p.m., CBSSN	(5)	vs. (8) Kent State; Semifinals	L 60–73	20–13	22 – Hill	7 – Agee	2 – tied	Rocket Mortgage FieldHouse; Cleveland, OH
CIT
March 20, 2024; 7:00 p.m., ESPN+		Purdue Fort Wayne; Jim Phelan Classic – quarterfinals	L 75–77	20–14	26 – Hill	8 – Spurgin	5 – Spurgin	Stroh Center (1,219); Bowling Green, OH
*Non-conference game. ^{#}Rankings from AP poll. (#) Tournament seedings in parentheses. All times are in Eastern.
