= 2023–24 Marshall Thundering Herd men's basketball team =

American college basketball season

2023–24 Marshall Thundering Herd men's basketball
- Conference: Sun Belt Conference
- Record: 13–20 (7–11 Sun Belt)
- Head coach: Dan D'Antoni (10th season)
- Associate head coach: Cornelius Jackson
- Assistant coaches: Mark Cline; Adam Williams; Justin Caldwell
- Home arena: Cam Henderson Center

2023–24 Sun Belt Conference men's basketball standings
	Conf.				Overall
Team	W		L	PCT	W		L	PCT
Appalachian State	16	–	2	.889	27	–	7	.794
James Madison †	15	–	3	.833	32	–	4	.889
Troy	13	–	5	.722	20	–	12	.625
Arkansas State	11	–	7	.611	20	–	17	.541
Louisiana	10	–	8	.556	19	–	14	.576
Southern Miss	9	–	9	.500	16	–	16	.500
Georgia State	8	–	10	.444	14	–	17	.452
South Alabama	8	–	10	.444	16	–	16	.500
Georgia Southern	8	–	10	.444	9	–	24	.273
Marshall	7	–	11	.389	13	–	20	.394
Texas State	7	–	11	.389	17	–	18	.486
Louisiana–Monroe	6	–	12	.333	11	–	19	.367
Coastal Carolina	5	–	13	.278	9	–	22	.290
Old Dominion	3	–	15	.167	7	–	25	.219
† 2024 Sun Belt tournament winner

The 2023–24 Marshall Thundering Herd men's basketball team represented Marshall University during the 2023–24 NCAA Division I men's basketball season. The Thundering Herd, led by tenth-year head coach Dan D'Antoni, played their home games at the Cam Henderson Center as members of the Sun Belt Conference. They finished the season 13–20, 7–11 in Sun Belt play to finish in a tie for tenth place. As the No. 10 seed in the Sun Belt tournament, they defeated Georgia State in the second round before losing to James Madison in the quarterfinals.

After the season, it was announced that head coach Dan D'Antoni was let go and replaced by his associate head coach, Cornelius Jackson.

== Previous season ==
The Thundering Herd finished the season 24–8, 13–5 in Sun Belt play to finish in a tie for second place. They lost to Texas State in the quarterfinals of the Sun Belt tournament. Despite finishing with 24 wins, they did not participate in a postseason tournament.

The season marked the school's inaugural season in the Sun Belt Conference after spending the previous 17 seasons as a member of Conference USA.

== Offseason ==
=== Departures ===
Name	Number	Pos.	Height	Weight	Year	Hometown	Notes
David Early	23	G	6'4"	234	Sophomore	Logan, West Virginia	Transferred to Tennessee Tech
Micah Handlogten	5	C	7'1"	227	Freshman	Huntersville, North Carolina	Transferred to Florida
Taevion Kinsey	24	G	6'5"	191	Senior	Columbus, Ohio	Graduated
Andrew Taylor	0	G	6'3"	194	RS Senior	Corbin, Kentucky	Graduate transferred to Mississippi State

=== Incoming transfers ===
Name	Number	Pos.	Height	Weight	Year	Hometown	Previous school
Cameron Crawford	5	G	6'5"	195	Junior	Hoover, Alabama	Indiana State
Nate Martin	41	F	6'8"	215	Junior	Houston, Texas	Texas State
Kevon Voyles	0	G	6'3"	181	GS Senior	Cape Charles, Virginia	Maryland Eastern Shore

=== 2023 recruiting class ===
College recruiting information
Name	Hometown	School	Height	Weight	Commit date
Ryan Nutter; PG	Dublin, Ohio	Dublin Jerome High School	6 ft 3 in (1.91 m)	185 lb (84 kg)	Jul 26, 2022
Ryan Nutter; PG	Recruit ratings: (NR)				
Overall recruit ranking: Rivals: NR 247Sports: NR ESPN: NR
Note: In many cases, Scout, Rivals, 247Sports, On3, and ESPN may conflict in their listings of height and weight.; In these cases, the average was taken. ESPN grades are on a 100-point scale.; Sources: "Marshall Basketball Commitment List". Rivals.; "ESPN". ESPN.; "2023 Team Ranking". Rivals.

== Preseason ==
=== Preseason Sun Belt Conference poll ===
The Thundering Herd were picked to finish in seventh place in the conference's preseason poll. Senior guard Kamdyn Curfman and senior forward Obinna Anochili-Killen were named to the preseason All-SBC Second Team.

Coaches poll
Predicted finish	Team (1st place Votes)
1	James Madison - 176 (7)
2	App State - 159 (2)
3	Old Dominion - 154 (1)
4	Southern Miss - 148
5	Louisiana - 136 (2)
6	South Alabama - 129 (2)
7	Marshall - 119
8	Troy - 91
9	Arkansas State - 84
10	Texas State - 72
11	Georgia State - 69
12	Coastal Carolina - 59
13	Georgia Southern - 42
14	ULM - 32

== Roster ==
2023–24 Marshall Thundering Herd men's basketball team
Players
Coaches

Pos.	#	Name	Height	Weight	Year	Previous school	Hometown
G	0	Kevon Voyles	6 ft 3 in (1.91 m)	198 lb (90 kg)	GS	UMES	Cape Charles, Virginia
F	1	Chase McKey	6 ft 10 in (2.08 m)	202 lb (92 kg)	Jr	The Skill Factory	Atlanta, Georgia
F	2	Wyatt Fricks	6 ft 10 in (2.08 m)	197 lb (89 kg)	RS So	Winder-Barrow	Winder, Georgia
G	3	Kyle Braun	6 ft 2 in (1.88 m)	182 lb (83 kg)	Jr	Scotland Prep	Los Angeles, California
G/F	4	Jacob Conner	6 ft 10 in (2.08 m)	209 lb (95 kg)	So	Archbishop Alter	Dayton, Ohio
G	5	Cameron Crawford	6 ft 5 in (1.96 m)	192 lb (87 kg)	RS So	Indiana State	Hoover, Alabama
G	11	Kamdyn Curfman	6 ft 1 in (1.85 m)	185 lb (84 kg)	Sr	VMI	North Bethesda, Maryland
G/F	12	Aymeric Toussaint	6 ft 10 in (2.08 m)	230 lb (104 kg)	Jr	Hoosac	Saint-Denis, Réunion
G	13	Creighton Thienneman (W)	6 ft 5 in (1.96 m)	192 lb (87 kg)	RS So	South Oldham	Louisville, Kentucky
G	14	Ryan Nutter	6 ft 4 in (1.93 m)	189 lb (86 kg)	Fr	Dublin Jerome	Dublin, Ohio
G/F	15	Marko Sarenac	6 ft 7 in (2.01 m)	218 lb (99 kg)	GS	Hoosac	Ljubovija, Serbia
C	21	Goran Miladinovic	7 ft 1 in (2.16 m)	240 lb (109 kg)	GS	Hoosac	Tivat, Montenegro
F	25	Obinna Anochili-Killen	6 ft 8 in (2.03 m)	217 lb (98 kg)	Sr	Chapmanville	Lagos, Nigeria
G	30	Kycen Pruett (W)	6 ft 4 in (1.93 m)	178 lb (81 kg)	Fr	Mount Dora Christian	Mount Dora, Florida
F	32	Pete Moe II (W)	6 ft 9 in (2.06 m)	217 lb (98 kg)	Fr	The Skill Factory	Atlanta, Georgia
F	41	Nate Martin	6 ft 8 in (2.03 m)	232 lb (105 kg)	Jr	Texas State	Houston, Texas

Head coach

- Dan D'Antoni (Marshall)

Assistant coach(es)

- Cornelius Jackson (Marshall)
- Mark Cline (Wake Forest)
- Adam Williams (Marshall)
- Justin Caldwell (Glenville State)

Legend

- (C) Team captain
- (S) Suspended
- (I) Ineligible
- (W) Walk-on
- Injured
- Current redshirt

Roster
Last update: 12/2/2023

== Schedule and results ==
Date time, TV	Rank^{#}	Opponent^{#}	Result	Record	High points	High rebounds	High assists	Site (attendance) city, state
Exhibition
October 29, 2023*; 3:00 pm		Pikeville	W 101–69	–	24 – Curfman	9 – Martin	5 – Tied	Cam Henderson Center (3,154); Huntington, WV
November 1, 2023*; 7:00 pm		Lees–McRae	W 103–85	–	22 – Fricks	10 – Fricks	9 – Conner	Cam Henderson Center (3,152); Huntington, WV
Non-conference regular season
November 6, 2023*; 7:00 pm, ESPN+		Queens	W 89–73	1–0	18 – Voyles	9 – Martin	5 – Tied	Cam Henderson Center (4,443); Huntington, WV
November 10, 2023*; 7:00 pm, ESPN+		vs. Radford	L 62–66	1–1	18 – Curfman	11 – Martin	4 – Tied	The Greenbrier (1,013); White Sulphur Springs, WV
November 19, 2023*; 5:00 pm, FloSports		vs. Utah State; Cayman Islands Classic quarterfinals	L 60–83	1–2	17 – Voyles	7 – Conner	4 – Crawford	John Gray Gymnasium (100); George Town, Cayman Islands
November 20, 2023*; 5:00 pm, FloSports		vs. FIU; Cayman Islands Classic consolation 2nd round	W 80–69	2–2	18 – Voyles	11 – Martin	4 – Tied	John Gray Gymnasium; George Town, Cayman Islands
November 21, 2023*; 1:30 pm, FloSports		vs. Oakland; Cayman Islands Classic 5th place game	L 71–78	2–3	18 – Voyles	11 – Fricks	3 – Conner	John Gray Gymnasium; George Town, Cayman Islands
November 24, 2023*; 7:00 pm, SECN		at No. 16 Kentucky	L 82–118	2–4	22 – Anochili-Killen	10 – Martin	4 – Nutter	Rupp Arena (20,246); Lexington, KY
December 2, 2023*; 7:00 pm, ESPN+		Miami (OH)	L 74–79	2–5	14 – Martin	10 – Tied	3 – Nutter	Cam Henderson Center (4,233); Huntington, WV
December 6, 2023*; 7:00 pm, ESPN+		Duquesne	L 72–85	2–6	20 – Crawford	12 – Anochili-Killen	3 – Voyles	Cam Henderson Center (3,947); Huntington, WV
December 9, 2023*; 4:00 pm, ESPN+		at Ohio	W 74–69	3–6	18 – Tied	8 – Martin	3 – Crawford	Convocation Center (4,623); Athens, OH
December 13, 2023*; 7:00 pm, ESPN+		at Toledo	L 87–88	3–7	25 – Anochili-Killen	9 – Martin	9 – Curfman	Savage Arena (3,878); Toledo, OH
December 16, 2023*; 7:00 pm, ESPN+		UNC Greensboro	W 72–65	4–7	18 – Curfman	11 – Martin	6 – Tied	Cam Henderson Center (3,933); Huntington, WV
December 18, 2023*; 7:00 pm, ESPN+		Bluefield	W 103–70	5–7	17 – Crawford	13 – Martin	5 – Tied	Cam Henderson Center (3,653); Huntington, WV
December 21, 2023*; 7:00 pm, ESPN+		UNC Wilmington	L 69–78	5–8	15 – Curfman	8 – Anochili-Killen	6 – Anochili-Killen	Cam Henderson Center (4,034); Huntington, WV
Sun Belt Conference regular season
December 30, 2023; 4:00 pm, ESPN+		Louisiana	W 75–61	6–8 (1–0)	16 – Martin	10 – Martin	4 – Curfman	Cam Henderson Center (4,248); Huntington, WV
January 3, 2024; 7:30 pm, ESPN+		at Louisiana–Monroe	W 68–57	7–8 (2–0)	20 – Anochili-Killen	9 – Anochili-Killen	9 – Conner	Fant–Ewing Coliseum (919); Monroe, LA
January 6, 2024; 5:00 pm, ESPN+		at Texas State	W 79–75	8–8 (3–0)	21 – Anochili-Killen	12 – Martin	5 – Curfman	Strahan Arena (1,342); San Marcos, TX
January 10, 2024; 7:00 pm, ESPN+		Georgia Southern	W 79–74	9–8 (4–0)	20 – Voyles	8 – Conner	6 – Conner	Cam Henderson Center (4,262); Huntington, WV
January 13, 2024; 4:00 pm, ESPN+		South Alabama	L 85–91	9–9 (4–1)	26 – Anochili-Killen	9 – Conner	6 – Martin	Cam Henderson Center (5,711); Huntington, WV
January 18, 2024; 7:00 pm, ESPN+		at Old Dominion	L 66–91	9–10 (4–2)	21 – Anochili-Killen	11 – Conner	4 – Voyles	Chartway Arena (6,158); Norfolk, VA
January 20, 2024; 6:00 pm, ESPN+		at James Madison	L 52–67	9–11 (4–3)	23 – Curfman	10 – Martin	4 – Conner	Atlantic Union Bank Center (6,061); Harrisonburg, VA
January 24, 2024; 7:00 pm, ESPN+		Georgia State	W 77–68	10–11 (5–3)	22 – Anochili-Killen	13 – Martin	4 – Conner	Cam Henderson Center (4,045); Huntington, WV
January 27, 2024; 4:00 pm, ESPN+		Southern Miss	W 83–67	11–11 (6–3)	24 – Martin	10 – Martin	6 – Martin	Cam Henderson Center (4,697); Huntington, WV
February 1, 2024; 7:00 pm, ESPN+		Old Dominion	L 76–83	11–12 (6–4)	23 – Voyles	12 – Martin	10 – Martin	Cam Henderson Center (4,309); Huntington, WV
February 3, 2024; 4:00 pm, ESPN+		Coastal Carolina	W 91–74	12–12 (7–4)	30 – Anochili-Killen	10 – Anochili-Killen	6 – Nutter	Cam Henderson Center (5,711); Huntington, WV
February 7, 2024; 7:00 pm, ESPN+		at Troy	L 66–82	12–13 (7–5)	16 – Voyles	11 – Martin	4 – Martin	Trojan Arena (3,212); Troy, AL
February 15, 2024; 6:30 pm, ESPN+		at Appalachian State	L 58–73	12–14 (7–6)	19 – Voyles	12 – Martin	5 – Martin	Holmes Center (3,804); Boone, NC
February 17, 2024; 2:00 pm, ESPN+		at Coastal Carolina	L 67–74	12–15 (7–7)	15 – Voyles	8 – Fricks	6 – Voyles	HTC Center (1,982); Conway, SC
February 21, 2024; 7:00 pm, ESPN+		James Madison	L 58–84	12–16 (7–8)	12 – Martin	16 – Martin	2 – Conner	Cam Henderson Center (4,595); Huntington, WV
February 24, 2024; 6:00 pm, ESPN2		Appalachian State	L 58–65	12–17 (7–9)	19 – Tied	14 – Martin	3 – Conner	Cam Henderson Center (5,711); Huntington, WV
February 28, 2024; 7:00 pm, ESPN+		at Georgia Southern	L 73–87	12–18 (7–10)	22 – Voyles	10 – Martin	4 – Voyles	Hanner Fieldhouse (1,384); Statesboro, GA
March 1, 2024; 7:00 pm, ESPN+		at Georgia State	L 79–82	12–19 (7–11)	23 – Voyles	11 – Martin	6 – Voyles	GSU Convocation Center (2,122); Atlanta, GA
Sun Belt Conference Tournament
March 7, 2024; 8:30 pm, ESPN+	(10)	vs. (7) Georgia State; Second round	W 86–74	13–19	30 – Curfman	14 – Martin	5 – Martin	Pensacola Bay Center (1,207); Pensacola, FL
March 9, 2024; 8:30 pm, ESPN+	(10)	vs. (2) James Madison; Quarterfinals	L 64–81	13–20	15 – Anochili-Killen	10 – Martin	4 – Curfman	Pensacola Bay Center (2,501); Pensacola, FL
*Non-conference game. ^{#}Rankings from AP Poll. (#) Tournament seedings in parentheses. All times are in Eastern Time.
