= 2023–24 Toledo Rockets men's basketball team =

American college basketball season

2023–24 Toledo Rockets men's basketball

MAC regular-season champions
- Conference: Mid-American Conference
- Record: 20–12 (14–4 MAC)
- Head coach: Tod Kowalczyk (14th season)
- Associate head coach: Jeff Massey (10th season)
- Assistant coaches: Justin Ingram (6th season); Jordan Lauf (2nd season)
- Home arena: Savage Arena

2023–24 Mid-American Conference men's basketball standings
	Conf.				Overall
Team	W		L	PCT	W		L	PCT
Toledo	14	–	4	.778	20	–	12	.625
Akron †	13	–	5	.722	24	–	11	.686
Ohio	13	–	5	.722	20	–	13	.606
Central Michigan	12	–	6	.667	18	–	14	.563
Bowling Green	10	–	8	.556	20	–	14	.588
Western Michigan	9	–	9	.500	12	–	20	.375
Miami (OH)	9	–	9	.500	15	–	17	.469
Kent State	8	–	10	.444	17	–	17	.500
Ball State	7	–	11	.389	15	–	16	.484
Eastern Michigan	6	–	12	.333	13	–	18	.419
Northern Illinois	5	–	13	.278	11	–	20	.355
Buffalo	2	–	16	.111	4	–	27	.129
† 2024 MAC tournament winner

The 2023–24 Toledo Rockets men's basketball team represented the University of Toledo during the 2023–24 NCAA Division I men's basketball season. The Rockets, led by 14th-year head coach Tod Kowalczyk, played their home games at Savage Arena in Toledo, Ohio, as members of the Mid-American Conference (MAC). They finished the season 20–12, 14–4 in MAC play, to win their fourth straight regular-season MAC championship. They were upset by Kent State in the quarterfinals of the MAC tournament. Due to a rule change in the selection process for the National Invitation Tournament, conference champions were no longer guaranteed an automatic bid, which Toledo had secured each of the previous three years it won the MAC regular season title. Toledo was not selected for the NIT and declined to participate in the College Basketball Invitational and the CollegeInsider.com tournament.

== Previous season ==
The Rockets finished 27–8 and won their third straight regular-season championship with a 16–2 record in MAC play. They defeated Miami and Ohio in the first two rounds of the MAC tournament before losing to Kent State in the final. As a regular-season champion who did not win their conference tournament, they received an automatic bid to the National Invitation Tournament, where they lost to Michigan in the first round.

== Offseason ==
=== Departures ===
Departures
Name	Pos.	Height	Weight	Year	Hometown	Reason for departure
EJ Farmer	G	6'5"	170	Sophomore	Cleveland, OH	Transferred to Youngstown State
Elijah Wilson	G	6'5"	180	Sophomore	Lithonia, GA	Transferred to Maryland Eastern Shore
Setric Millner Jr.	F	6'7"	205	Senior	Little Rock, AR	Exhausted eligibility
RayJ Dennis	G	6'2"	180	Junior	Plainfield, IL	Transferred to Baylor
Kooper Jacobi	F	6'6"	200	Sophomore	Sellersburg, IN	Transferred to Eastern Illinois
A. J. Edu	F/C	6'10"	225	Junior	Colchester, England	Turned professional with Toyama Grouses
J Wallace	G	6'5"	185	Freshman	Bath, MI	Entered transfer portal
Cooper Davis	G	6'5"	190	Freshman	Powell, OH	Transferred to Ashland
JT Shumate	F	6'7"	210	Senior	Newark, OH	Exhausted eligibility

=== Incoming transfers ===
Transfers
Name	Pos.	Height	Weight	Year	Hometown	Previous school
Ben Wight	C	6'9"	220	RS junior	Columbus, OH	Transferred from William & Mary
Marko Maletic	G	6'6"	208	Sophomore	London, ON	Transferred from Long Island

=== Recruiting class ===
College recruiting
Name	Hometown	School	Height	Weight	Commit date
Bryce Ford; G	Scottsdale, AZ	Pinnacle	6 ft 3 in (1.91 m)	175 lb (79 kg)	
Bryce Ford; G	Recruit ratings: No ratings found				
Sonny Wilson; G	Pontiac, MI	Detroit Jesuit	6 ft 1 in (1.85 m)	175 lb (79 kg)	
Sonny Wilson; G	Recruit ratings: Scout: 247Sports: (79)				
Xavier Thomas; F	Detroit, MI	Brother Rice	6 ft 5 in (1.96 m)	225 lb (102 kg)	
Xavier Thomas; F	Recruit ratings: (NR)				
Sam Lewis; G	Chicago, IL	Simeon Academy	6 ft 6 in (1.98 m)	190 lb (86 kg)	
Sam Lewis; G	Recruit ratings: (NR)				
Grgur Brcic; F	Zagreb, Croatia	Northampton School	6 ft 10 in (2.08 m)	225 lb (102 kg)	
Grgur Brcic; F	Recruit ratings: (NR)				
Overall recruit ranking:
Note: In many cases, Scout, Rivals, 247Sports, On3, and ESPN may conflict in their listings of height and weight.; In these cases, the average was taken. ESPN grades are on a 100-point scale.; Sources: "2023 Team Ranking". Rivals.

== Roster ==
2023–24 Toledo Rockets men's basketball team
Players
Coaches

Pos.	#	Name	Height	Weight	Year	Previous school	Hometown
G	0	Ra'Heim Moss	6 ft 4 in (1.93 m)	205 lb (93 kg)	Jr	SPIRE Academy	Springfield, OH
F	1	Javan Simmons	6 ft 7 in (2.01 m)	235 lb (107 kg)	RS Fr	Gahanna Lincoln	Gahanna, OH
G	2	Bryce Ford	6 ft 2 in (1.88 m)	175 lb (79 kg)	Fr	Pinnacle	Scottsdale, AZ
G	3	Sonny Wilson	6 ft 1 in (1.85 m)	175 lb (79 kg)	Fr	Detroit Jesuit	Pontiac, MI
F	4	Xavier Thomas	6 ft 5 in (1.96 m)	240 lb (109 kg)	Fr	Brother Rice	Detroit, MI
G	11	Sam Lewis	6 ft 6 in (1.98 m)	200 lb (91 kg)	Fr	Simeon Academy	Chicago, IL
F	13	Andre Lorentsson	6 ft 8 in (2.03 m)	215 lb (98 kg)	Jr	Saint Louis	Gothenburg, Sweden
G	21	Dante Jr. Maddox	6 ft 2 in (1.88 m)	195 lb (88 kg)	Jr	Cal State Fullerton	Chicago Heights, IL
G	23	Tyler Cochran	6 ft 2 in (1.88 m)	225 lb (102 kg)	Jr	Ball State	Bolingbrook, IL
F	24	Grgur Brcic	6 ft 10 in (2.08 m)	225 lb (102 kg)	Fr	Northampton School	Zagreb, Croatia
G	27	Marko Maletic	6 ft 6 in (1.98 m)	208 lb (94 kg)	So	Long Island	London, ON
F	35	Ben Wight	6 ft 9 in (2.06 m)	220 lb (100 kg)	Jr	William & Mary	Columbus, OH

Head coach

- Tod Kowalczyk (Minnesota Duluth)

Assistant coach(es)

- Jeff Massey (Xavier)
- Justin Ingram (Toledo)
- Jordan Lauf (Toledo)

Legend

- (C) Team captain
- (S) Suspended
- (I) Ineligible
- (W) Walk-on
- Injured
- Current redshirt

Roster
Last update: September 29, 2023

== Schedule and results ==
Date time, TV	Rank^{#}	Opponent^{#}	Result	Record	High points	High rebounds	High assists	Site (attendance) city, state
Exhibition
October 21, 2023*; 2:00 p.m.		Ferris State	W 93–62	–	19 – Maddox Jr.	9 – Cochran	–	Savage Arena; Toledo, OH
October 29, 2023*; 4:00 p.m.		Findlay	W 95–70	–	19 – Moss	–	–	Savage Arena; Toledo, OH
Non-conference regular season
November 6, 2023*; 7:00 p.m., ESPN+		Detroit Mercy	W 94–60	1–0	15 – Moss	8 – Moss	5 – Moss	Savage Arena (4,223); Toledo, OH
November 11, 2023*; 7:00 p.m., ESPN+		Louisiana; MAC–SBC Challenge	W 87–78	2–0	18 – Cochran	5 – Moss	4 – Cochran	Savage Arena (4,290); Toledo, OH
November 14, 2023*; 7:00 p.m., ESPN+		at Wright State	W 78–77	3–0	20 – Maddox Jr.	7 – Moss	4 – Maddox Jr.	Nutter Center (4,239); Dayton, OH
November 21, 2023*; 11:15 p.m., FloHoops		vs. New Mexico; Ball Dawgs Classic	L 84–92	3–1	23 – Maddox Jr.	5 – Maddox Jr.	6 – Wilson	Dollar Loan Center; Henderson, NV
November 22, 2023*; 11:45 p.m., FloHoops		vs. UC Irvine; Ball Dawgs Classic	L 71–77	3–2	19 – Moss	6 – Wilson	4 – Moss	Dollar Loan Center; Henderson, NV
November 24, 2023*; 2:00 p.m., FloHoops		vs. Indiana State; Ball Dawgs Classic	L 74–76	3–3	14 – Simmons	7 – Cochran	4 – Cochran	Dollar Loan Center; Henderson, NV
December 2, 2023*; 7:00 p.m., ESPN+		George Mason	L 77–86	3–4	24 – Maddox Jr.	8 – Cochran	2 – tied	Savage Arena (3,907); Toledo, OH
December 6, 2023*; 7:00 p.m., ESPN+		at Oakland	W 69–68	4–4	20 – Maddox Jr.	8 – Simmons	4 – Moss	Athletics Center O'rena (2,893); Rochester, MI
December 9, 2023*; 2:00 p.m., ESPN+		Northern Iowa	W 84–80	5–4	21 – Moss	12 – Cochran	2 – tied	Savage Arena (4,041); Toledo, OH
December 13, 2023*; 7:00 p.m., ESPN+		Marshall	W 88–87	6–4	33 – Cochran	12 – Moss	5 – Cochran	Savage Arena (3,878); Toledo, OH
December 20, 2023*; 7:00 p.m., ESPN+		Vermont	L 60–86	6–5	12 – Cochran	8 – Moss	6 – Moss	Savage Arena (4,031); Toledo, OH
December 23, 2023*; 1:00 p.m., ESPN+		at West Virginia	L 81–91	6–6	21 – Moss	6 – tied	4 – Maddox Jr.	WVU Coliseum (10,693); Morgantown, WV
MAC regular season
January 2, 2024; 7:00 p.m., ESPNU		at Ohio	W 86–77	7–6 (1–0)	18 – tied	7 – Cochran	3 – tied	Convocation Center (4,016); Athens, OH
January 5, 2024; 2:00 p.m., CBSSN		Miami (OH)	W 68–64	8–6 (2–0)	18 – Moss	6 – Moss	2 – tied	Savage Arena (4,428); Toledo, OH
January 9, 2024; 7:00 p.m., CBSSN		at Kent State	W 89–75	9–6 (3–0)	21 – Cochran	6 – tied	4 – Moss	MAC Center (1,786); Kent, OH
January 13, 2024; 7:00 p.m., ESPN+		Ball State	W 77–72	10–6 (4–0)	24 – Moss	7 – Maddox Jr.	5 – Maddox Jr.	Savage Arena (4,413); Toledo, OH
January 16, 2024; 7:00 p.m., ESPN+		Buffalo	W 77–66	11–6 (5–0)	21 – Maddox Jr.	10 – Cochran	7 – Moss	Savage Arena (3,689); Toledo, OH
January 19, 2024; 7:00 p.m., CBSSN		at Central Michigan	L 62–65	11–7 (5–1)	21 – Maddox Jr.	10 – Cochran	3 – Cochran	McGuirk Arena (2,254); Mount Pleasant, MI
January 23, 2024; 8:00 p.m., ESPN+		at Northern Illinois	W 89–73	12–7 (6–1)	20 – Moss	7 – Maddox Jr.	3 – tied	Convocation Center (1,534); DeKalb, IL
January 27, 2024; 2:00 p.m., ESPN+		Bowling Green	W 88–72	13–7 (7–1)	26 – Maddox Jr.	10 – Cochran	10 – Moss	Savage Arena (7,318); Toledo, OH
January 30, 2024; 7:00 p.m., ESPN+		Western Michigan	W 88–63	14–7 (8–1)	19 – Simmons	6 – tied	4 – Maddox Jr.	Savage Arena (3,915); Toledo, OH
February 3, 2024; 7:00 p.m., ESPN+		at Akron	L 70–77	14–8 (8–2)	16 – Moss	9 – Cochran	4 – Moss	James A. Rhodes Arena (3,151); Akron, OH
February 6, 2024; 7:00 p.m., ESPN+		at Eastern Michigan	W 91–87	15–8 (9–2)	20 – tied	8 – Simmons	4 – Cochran	George Gervin GameAbove Center (1,542); Ypsilanti, MI
February 10, 2024*; 1:00 p.m., ESPN+		at Appalachian State; MAC-SBC Challenge	L 104–109 ^{2OT}	15–9	25 – Maddox Jr.	10 – Simmons	5 – Maddox Jr.	Holmes Center (5,437); Boone, NC
February 16, 2024; 9:00 p.m., ESPNU		Ohio	W 85–83	16–9 (10–2)	21 – Maddox Jr.	16 – Simmons	6 – Maddox Jr.	Savage Arena (5,079); Toledo, OH
February 20, 2024; 7:00 p.m., ESPN+		Akron	W 72–64	17–9 (11–2)	18 – Wilson	9 – Maddox Jr.	6 – Simmons	Savage Arena (5,547); Toledo, OH
February 23, 2024; 7:00 p.m., ESPN+		at Bowling Green	L 68–76	17–10 (11–3)	19 – Moss	7 – Cochran	3 – tied	Stroh Center (4,032); Bowling Green, OH
February 27, 2024; 7:00 p.m., ESPN+		Northern Illinois	L 72–75	17–11 (11–4)	27 – Cochran	9 – Maddox Jr.	5 – Wilson	Savage Arena (4,692); Toledo, OH
March 2, 2024; 2:00 p.m., ESPN+		at Buffalo	W 85–79	18–11 (12–4)	20 – Wilson	9 – Wilson	5 – Cochran	Alumni Arena (2,476); Buffalo, NY
March 5, 2024; 7:00 p.m., ESPN+		at Miami (OH)	W 97–63	19–11 (13–4)	22 – Cochran	9 – Maddox Jr.	5 – Maddox Jr.	Millett Hall (1,847); Oxford, OH
March 8, 2024; 7:00 p.m., ESPN+		Kent State	W 86–71	20–11 (14–4)	21 – Moss	8 – Simmons	7 – Moss	Savage Arena; Toledo, OH
MAC tournament
March 14, 2024; 11:00 a.m., ESPN+	(1)	vs. (8) Kent State; Quarterfinals	L 59–67	20–12	19 – Maddox Jr.	9 – Maddox Jr.	6 – Moss	Rocket Mortgage FieldHouse; Cleveland, OH
*Non-conference game. ^{#}Rankings from AP poll. (#) Tournament seedings in parentheses. All times are in Eastern.
