= 2023–24 Appalachian State Mountaineers men's basketball team =

American college basketball season

2023–24 Appalachian State Mountaineers men's basketball

Sun Belt regular-season champions Fort Myers Tip-Off Palms Division champions

NIT, first round
- Conference: Sun Belt Conference
- Record: 27–7 (16–2 Sun Belt)
- Head coach: Dustin Kerns (5th season)
- Associate head coach: Frank Young
- Assistant coaches: Tanner Smith; Bob Szorc
- Home arena: Holmes Center

2023–24 Sun Belt Conference men's basketball standings
	Conf.				Overall
Team	W		L	PCT	W		L	PCT
Appalachian State	16	–	2	.889	27	–	7	.794
James Madison †	15	–	3	.833	32	–	4	.889
Troy	13	–	5	.722	20	–	12	.625
Arkansas State	11	–	7	.611	20	–	17	.541
Louisiana	10	–	8	.556	19	–	14	.576
Southern Miss	9	–	9	.500	16	–	16	.500
Georgia State	8	–	10	.444	14	–	17	.452
South Alabama	8	–	10	.444	16	–	16	.500
Georgia Southern	8	–	10	.444	9	–	24	.273
Marshall	7	–	11	.389	13	–	20	.394
Texas State	7	–	11	.389	17	–	18	.486
Louisiana–Monroe	6	–	12	.333	11	–	19	.367
Coastal Carolina	5	–	13	.278	9	–	22	.290
Old Dominion	3	–	15	.167	7	–	25	.219
† 2024 Sun Belt tournament winner

The 2023–24 Appalachian State Mountaineers men's basketball team represented Appalachian State University in the 2023–24 NCAA Division I men's basketball season. The Mountaineers, led by fifth-year head coach Dustin Kerns, played their home games at the Holmes Center in Boone, North Carolina as members in the Sun Belt Conference.

The Mountaineers finished the season 27–7, 16–2 in Sun Belt play, to finish as the conference's regular-season champions. In the Sun Belt tournament, the Mountaineers defeated Georgia Southern in the semifinals but lost to Arkansas State in the quarterfinals. They lost to Wake Forest in the first round of the National Invitation Tournament.

== Previous season ==
The Mountaineers finished the 2022–23 season 16–16, 9–9 in Sun Belt play, to finish in a tie for seventh place. They lost to South Alabama in the first round of the Sun Belt tournament.

== Offseason ==
=== Departures ===
Name	Number	Pos.	Height	Weight	Year	Hometown	Reason for departure
Carvell Teasett	12	G	6' 1"	180	Sophomore	Baton Rouge, LA	Transferred to Angelo State
Michael Eads Jr.	10	G	6' 4"	200	Sophomore	Orlando, FL	Entered Transfer Portal
Zocko Littelton	4	G	6' 3"	175	Freshman	Marietta, GA	Transferred to Chipola College
Quinn Hafner	24	G	6' 3"	170	Freshman (walk-on)	Centerville, OH	Unknown
Tamell Pearson	3	F	6' 10"	223	Senior	Chicago, IL	Graduated
Tyree Boykin	30	G	6' 1"	190	GS Senior	Clarksville, TN	Graduated
Dibaji Walker	35	F	6' 9"	200	GS Senior	Columbus, OH	Graduated

=== 2023 recruiting class ===
College recruiting information
Name	Hometown	School	Height	Weight	Commit date
Joshua Hayes; PF	Gainesville, FL	The Rock School	6 ft 9 in (2.06 m)	220 lb (100 kg)	Sep 19, 2022
Joshua Hayes; PF	Recruit ratings: No ratings found				
Etienne Strothers; PG	Newport News, VA	Menchville High School	6 ft 2 in (1.88 m)	160 lb (73 kg)	Aug 23, 2022
Etienne Strothers; PG	Recruit ratings: No ratings found				
Overall recruit ranking:
Note: In many cases, Scout, Rivals, 247Sports, On3, and ESPN may conflict in their listings of height and weight.; In these cases, the average was taken. ESPN grades are on a 100-point scale.; Sources: "2023 Team Ranking". Rivals.

== Preseason ==
=== Preseason Sun Belt Conference poll ===
The Mountaineers were picked to finish in second place in the conference's preseason poll. Graduate forward Donovan Gregory was named to the preseason All-SBC First Team. Senior forward C. J. Huntley was named to the conference preseason third team.

Coaches poll
Predicted finish	Team (1st-place votes)
1	James Madison – 176 (7)
2	App State – 159 (2)
3	Old Dominion – 154 (1)
4	Southern Miss – 148
5	Louisiana – 136 (2)
6	South Alabama – 129 (2)
7	Marshall – 119
8	Troy – 91
9	Arkansas State – 84
10	Texas State – 72
11	Georgia State – 69
12	Coastal Carolina – 59
13	Georgia Southern – 42
14	ULM – 32

== Roster ==
2023–24 Appalachian State Mountaineers men's basketball team
Players
Coaches

Pos.	#	Name	Height	Weight	Year	Previous school	Hometown
G	0	Xavion Brown	6 ft 3 in (1.91 m)	180 lb (82 kg)	Jr	Sheldon	Sacramento, CA
F	2	Christopher Mantis	6 ft 7 in (2.01 m)	185 lb (84 kg)	Jr	Lowell	Lowell, IN
C	3	Luke Wilson	6 ft 9 in (2.06 m)	285 lb (129 kg)	Fr	Augusta Christian School	Augusta, GA
G	4	Jordan Marsh	5 ft 10 in (1.78 m)	165 lb (75 kg)	Fr	Moravian Prep	Charlotte, NC
G	5	Etienne Strothers	6 ft 2 in (1.88 m)	170 lb (77 kg)	Fr	Menchville HS	Newport News, VA
F	11	Donovan Gregory	6 ft 5 in (1.96 m)	190 lb (86 kg)	GS	Carmel Christian School	Charlotte, NC
G	12	Myles Tate	6 ft 0 in (1.83 m)	170 lb (77 kg)	Jr	Dorman; Butler	Spartanburg, SC
G	14	Bryant Greene (W)	6 ft 1 in (1.85 m)	175 lb (79 kg)	GS	Watauga	Boone, NC
F	15	C. J. Huntley	6 ft 10 in (2.08 m)	221 lb (100 kg)	Sr	Davidson Day School	Huntersville, NC
F	21	Justin Abson	6 ft 9 in (2.06 m)	235 lb (107 kg)	So	North Broward Prep	Pompano Beach, FL
F	22	Josh Hayes	6 ft 9 in (2.06 m)	220 lb (100 kg)	Fr	Gainesville HS	Gainesville, FL
G	23	Terence Harcum	6 ft 3 in (1.91 m)	190 lb (86 kg)	Jr	Granville Central	Butner, NC
F	24	Tre'Von Spillers	6 ft 7 in (2.01 m)	205 lb (93 kg)	Jr	Military Magnet Academy; Moberly Area CC	Charleston, SC
G	32	Luke Ledford	6 ft 3 in (1.91 m)	190 lb (86 kg)	Fr	Broughton HS	Raleigh, NC
G	33	Dawson Fennema	6 ft 2 in (1.88 m)	170 lb (77 kg)	So	Sanderson HS	Raleigh, NC

Head coach

- Dustin Kerns (Clemson)

Assistant coach(es)

- Frank Young (West Virginia)
- Tanner Smith (Clemson)
- Bob Szorc (St. John's)

Legend

- (C) Team captain
- (S) Suspended
- (I) Ineligible
- (W) Walk-on
- Injured
- Current redshirt

Roster
Last update: November 19, 2023

== Schedule and results ==
Date time, TV	Rank^{#}	Opponent^{#}	Result	Record	High points	High rebounds	High assists	Site (attendance) city, state
Non-conference regular season
November 7, 2023*; 6:30 p.m., ESPN+		Oakland City	W 87–49	1–0	16 – Spillers	12 – Abson	5 – 2 tied	Holmes Center (2,010); Boone, NC
November 11, 2023*; 3:00 p.m., ESPN+		at Northern Illinois; MAC–SBC Challenge	L 78–91	1–1	16 – Mantis	9 – Spillers	4 – Brown	Convocation Center (1,071); DeKalb, IL
November 14, 2023*; 10:00 p.m., P12N		at Oregon State	L 71–81 ^{OT}	1–2	18 – Harcum	10 – Abson	4 – 2 tied	Gill Coliseum (2,766); Corvallis, OR
November 21, 2023*; 12:00 p.m.		vs. UNC Wilmington; Fort Myers Tip-Off Event	W 86−56	2–2	15 – Spillers	13 – Abson	6 – Marsh	Suncoast Credit Union Arena (512); Fort Myers, FL
November 22, 2023*; 12:00 p.m.		vs. Murray State; Fort Myers Tip-Off Event	W 67–57	3–2	16 – Gregory	7 – Spillers	3 – 2 tied	Suncoast Credit Union Arena (310); Fort Myers, FL
November 26, 2023*; 1:00 p.m., ESPN+		Austin Peay	W 78–58	4–2	20 – Spillers	7 – 2 tied	5 – Brown	Holmes Center (1,298); Boone, NC
November 29, 2023*; 6:30 p.m., ESPN+		East Tennessee State	W 72–61	5–2	15 – Spillers	11 – Spillers	5 – Tate	Holmes Center (1,813); Boone, NC
December 3, 2023*; 1:00 p.m., ESPN2		Auburn	W 69–64	6–2	18 – Tate	6 – Gregory	4 – Gregory	Holmes Center (7,037); Boone, NC
December 5, 2023*; 8:00 p.m., ESPN+		Central Penn	W 111–35	7–2	18 – Hayes	16 – Brown	7 – Greene	Holmes Center (1,978); Boone, NC
December 13, 2023*; 7:00 p.m., ESPN+		at Queens	W 93–81	8–2	22 – 2 tied	10 – Spillers	5 – 2 tied	Curry Arena (1,532); Charlotte, NC
December 16, 2023*; 4:00 p.m.		vs. Gardner–Webb	W 80–59	9–2	16 – Spillers	8 – Huntley	5 – 2 tied	Novant Health Fieldhouse (423); Greensboro, NC
December 21, 2023*; 7:00 p.m., ESPN+		UNC Asheville; Hickory Hoops Classic	L 63–76	9–3	18 – Gregory	7 – Spillers	3 – 2 tied	Tarleton Complex (1,825); Hickory, NC
Sun Belt Conference regular season
December 30, 2023; 4:00 p.m., ESPN+		Louisiana–Monroe	W 67–55	10–3 (1–0)	18 – Spillers	9 – Spillers	4 – Tate	Holmes Center (2,065); Boone, NC
January 4, 2024; 8:00 p.m., ESPN+		at South Alabama	W 91–84 ^{OT}	11–3 (2–0)	23 – Spillers	9 – Spillers	4 – 2 tied	Mitchell Center (1,646); Mobile, AL
January 6, 2024; 4:30 p.m., ESPN+		at Troy	L 62–66	11–4 (2–1)	13 – Huntley	10 – Abson	4 – Tate	Trojan Arena (2,673); Troy, AL
January 11, 2024; 7:00 p.m., ESPN+		at Coastal Carolina	W 70–45	12–4 (3–1)	13 – Tate	9 – Abson	3 – 2 tied	HTC Center (1,838); Conway, SC
January 13, 2024; 4:00 p.m., ESPN+		at James Madison	W 59–55	13–4 (4–1)	15 – Tate	10 – Spillers	4 – Tate	Atlantic Union Bank Center (7,761); Harrisonburg, VA
January 17, 2024; 6:30 p.m.		Georgia State	W 76–68	14–4 (5–1)	23 – Spillers	13 – Spillers	6 – Tate	Holmes Center (2,534); Boone, NC
January 20, 2024; 4:30 p.m., ESPN+		Coastal Carolina	W 88–59	15–4 (6–1)	18 – Spillers	9 – Spillers	6 – Gregory	Holmes Center (3,174); Boone, NC
January 25, 2024; 6:30 p.m, ESPN+		Georgia Southern	W 84–74	16–4 (7–1)	23 – Harcum	9 – 2 tied	3 – Marsh	Holmes Center (3,136); Boone, NC
January 27, 2024; 6:00 p.m., ESPN2		James Madison	W 82–76	17–4 (8–1)	21 – Spillers	11 – Abson	6 – Gregory	Holmes Center (8,052); Boone, NC
February 1, 2024; 7:00 pm, ESPN+		at Georgia State	W 81–71	18–4 (9–1)	22 – Harcum	16 – Abson	6 – Brown	Georgia State Convocation Center (3,127); Atlanta, GA
February 3, 2024; 3:00 p.m., ESPN+		at Georgia Southern	W 85–84 ^{OT}	19–4 (10–1)	26 – Harcum	11 – Spillers	5 – Tate	Hanner Fieldhouse (2,412); Statesboro, GA
February 7, 2024; 8:00 p.m., ESPN+		at Texas State	L 56–63	19–5 (10–2)	13 – Harcum	9 – Spillers	5 – Tate	Strahan Arena (1,498); San Marcos, TX
February 10, 2024*; 1:00 p.m., ESPN+		Toledo; MAC–SBC Challenge	W 109–104 ^{OT}	20–5 (10–2)	24 – Gregory	7 – 2 tied	4 – 2 tied	Holmes Center (5,437); Boone, NC
February 15, 2024; 6:30 p.m., ESPN+		Marshall	W 73–58	21–5 (11–2)	19 – Gregory	14 – Spillers	5 – Tate	Holmes Center (3,804); Boone, NC
February 17, 2024; 4:30 p.m., ESPN+		Louisiana	W 85–73	22–5 (12–2)	23 – Marsh	8 – Spillers	4 – Tate	Holmes Center (6,587); Boone, NC
February 22, 2024; 7:00 p.m., ESPN+		at Old Dominion	W 82–67	23–5 (13–2)	22 – Harcum	11 – 2 tied	5 – Tate	Chartway Arena (6,157); Norfolk, VA
February 24, 2024; 6:00 p.m., ESPN2		at Marshall	W 65–58	24–5 (14–2)	25 – Tate	11 – Spillers	5 – Tate	Cam Henderson Center (5,711); Huntington, WV
February 28, 2024; 6:30 p.m., ESPN+		Old Dominion	W 89–64	25–5 (15–2)	18 – Spillers	16 – Spillers	4 – Gregory	Holmes Center (4,785); Boone, NC
March 1, 2024; 6:30 p.m., ESPN+		Arkansas State	W 80–57	26–5 (16–2)	15 – 2 tied	15 – Spillers	4 – Gregory	Holmes Center (7,074); Boone, NC
Sun Belt tournament
March 9, 2024; 12:30 p.m., ESPN+	(1)	vs. (9) Georgia Southern; Quarterfinals	W 85–80 ^{OT}	27–5	22 – Gregory	12 – Abson	4 – 2 tied	Pensacola Bay Center (1,763); Pensacola, FL
March 10, 2024; 6:00 p.m., ESPN+	(1)	vs. (4) Arkansas State; Semifinals	L 65–67	27–6	15 – Harcum	7 – Abson	4 – Gregory	Pensacola Bay Center (1,621); Pensacola, FL
NIT
March 20, 2024; 8:00 p.m., ESPN+		at (1) Wake Forest; First round – Wake Forest bracket	L 76–87	27–7	16 – Huntley	10 – Spillers	5 – Tate	LJVM Coliseum (6,733); Winston-Salem, NC
*Non-conference game. ^{#}Rankings from AP poll. (#) Tournament seedings in parentheses. All times are in Eastern.
