= 2023–24 Arkansas State Red Wolves men's basketball team =

Men's basketball team

2023–24 Arkansas State Red Wolves men's basketball

CBI, semifinals
- Conference: Sun Belt Conference
- Record: 20–17 (11–7 Sun Belt)
- Head coach: Bryan Hodgson (1st season)
- Assistant coaches: Jamie Quarles; Tee Butters; Derek Rongstad
- Home arena: First National Bank Arena

2023–24 Sun Belt Conference men's basketball standings
	Conf.				Overall
Team	W		L	PCT	W		L	PCT
Appalachian State	16	–	2	.889	27	–	7	.794
James Madison †	15	–	3	.833	32	–	4	.889
Troy	13	–	5	.722	20	–	12	.625
Arkansas State	11	–	7	.611	20	–	17	.541
Louisiana	10	–	8	.556	19	–	14	.576
Southern Miss	9	–	9	.500	16	–	16	.500
Georgia State	8	–	10	.444	14	–	17	.452
South Alabama	8	–	10	.444	16	–	16	.500
Georgia Southern	8	–	10	.444	9	–	24	.273
Marshall	7	–	11	.389	13	–	20	.394
Texas State	7	–	11	.389	17	–	18	.486
Louisiana–Monroe	6	–	12	.333	11	–	19	.367
Coastal Carolina	5	–	13	.278	9	–	22	.290
Old Dominion	3	–	15	.167	7	–	25	.219
† 2024 Sun Belt tournament winner

The 2023–24 Arkansas State Red Wolves men's basketball team represented Arkansas State University in the 2023–24 NCAA Division I men's basketball season. The Red Wolves, led by first-year head coach Bryan Hodgson, played their home games at the First National Bank Arena in Jonesboro, Arkansas as members of the Sun Belt Conference.

The Red Wolves finished the season 20–17, 11–7 in Sun Belt play to finish in fourth place. They defeated Louisiana in the quarterfinals and Appalachian State in the semifinals of the Sun Belt tournament before losing to James Madison in the championship game.

They were invited to play in the College Basketball Invitational, where they defeated Bethune–Cookman in the first round and Montana in the quarterfinals before losing to High Point in the semifinals.

== Previous season ==
The Red Wolves finished the 2022–23 season 13–20, 4–14 in Sun Belt play, to finish in 13th place. They defeated Coastal Carolina in the first round of the Sun Belt tournament before losing to Troy in the second round.

== Preseason ==
=== Preseason Sun Belt Conference poll ===
The Red Wolves were picked to finish in ninth place in the conference's preseason poll.

Coaches poll
Predicted finish	Team (1st-place votes)
1	James Madison – 176 (7)
2	App State – 159 (2)
3	Old Dominion – 154 (1)
4	Southern Miss – 148
5	Louisiana – 136 (2)
6	South Alabama – 129 (2)
7	Marshall – 119
8	Troy – 91
9	Arkansas State – 84
10	Texas State – 72
11	Georgia State – 69
12	Coastal Carolina – 59
13	Georgia Southern – 42
14	ULM – 32

== Roster ==
2023–24 Arkansas State Red Wolves men's basketball team
Players
Coaches

Pos.	#	Name	Height	Weight	Year	Previous school	Hometown
G	0	Caleb Fields	6 ft 0 in (1.83 m)	190 lb (86 kg)	Sr	Aspire Basketball Academy	Lewisburg, TN
F	1	LaQuill Hardnett	6 ft 8 in (2.03 m)	204 lb (93 kg)	GS	Buffalo	Philadelphia, PA
G	2	Freddy Hicks	6 ft 6 in (1.98 m)	214 lb (97 kg)	Jr	Tarleton State	Searcy, AR
G	3	Derrian Ford	6 ft 3 in (1.91 m)	207 lb (94 kg)	So	Arkansas	Magnolia, AR
G	4	Noah McDavid	6 ft 5 in (1.96 m)	191 lb (87 kg)	Jr	Tarleton State	Dallas, TX
G	6	Taryn Todd	6 ft 4 in (1.93 m)	177 lb (80 kg)	Jr	Northwest Florida State College	Vaughan, ON
G	7	Zane Butler	5 ft 11 in (1.8 m)	155 lb (70 kg)	Jr	Navarro College	Paragould, AR
F	8	Lado Laku	6 ft 10 in (2.08 m)	214 lb (97 kg)	Jr	Indian Hills CC	Dallas, TX
G	9	Obadiah Curtis	6 ft 5 in (1.96 m)	191 lb (87 kg)	Jr	Reedley College	Fresno, CA
G	10	Avery Felts (W)	6 ft 2 in (1.88 m)	191 lb (87 kg)	RS Jr	Westside HS	Bono, AR
G	11	Terrance Jr. Ford	6 ft 1 in (1.85 m)	177 lb (80 kg)	So	Victory Rock Prep	Chicago, IL
G	19	Malcolm Farrington	6 ft 3 in (1.91 m)	215 lb (98 kg)	RS Jr	DME Academy	West Palm Beach, FL
F	23	Julian Lual	6 ft 6 in (1.98 m)	197 lb (89 kg)	Jr	McCook Community College	Calgary, AB
G	30	Jacob St. Clair	6 ft 3 in (1.91 m)	165 lb (75 kg)	Fr	Sand Rock HS	Sand Rock, AL
F	35	Izaiyah Nelson	6 ft 10 in (2.08 m)	210 lb (95 kg)	So	Marietta HS	Marietta, GA
F	45	Dyondre Dominguez	6 ft 9 in (2.06 m)	208 lb (94 kg)	Jr	UMass	Providence, RI

Head coach

- Bryan Hodgson (Fredonia State)

Assistant coach(es)

- Jamie Quarles (Augusta State)
- Tee Butters (Clemson)
- Derek Rongstad (UW–Whitewater)

Legend

- (C) Team captain
- (S) Suspended
- (I) Ineligible
- (W) Walk-on
- Injured
- Current redshirt

Roster
Last update: November 19, 2023

== Schedule and results ==
Date time, TV	Rank^{#}	Opponent^{#}	Result	Record	High points	High rebounds	High assists	Site (attendance) city, state
Exhibition
October 25, 2023*; 6:00 p.m.		Trevecca Nazarene	W 112–61		22 – Todd	9 – Dominguez	12 – Fields	First National Bank Arena (2,083); Jonesboro, AR
October 30, 2023*; 7:00 p.m.		Central Arkansas; Wynne Tornado Relief	W 112–77		23 – Hicks	11 – Nelson	9 – Fields	First National Bank Arena (2,208); Jonesboro, AR
Non-conference regular season
November 6, 2023*; 7:00 p.m., BTN+		at Wisconsin	L 76–105	0–1	21 – Hicks	8 – Dominguez	2 – 2 tied	Kohl Center (14,033); Madison, WI
November 11, 2023*; 11:00am, ESPN+		at Bowling Green; MAC–SBC Challenge	L 75–81	0–2	31 – Todd	10 – Dominguez	7 – Todd	Stroh Center (1,513); Bowling Green, OH
November 14, 2023*; 7:00 p.m., ESPN+		Alcorn State	W 100–86	1–2	18 – Dominguez	9 – Dominguez	8 – Fields	First National Bank Arena (2,388); Jonesboro, AR
November 17, 2023*; 7:00 p.m., BTN+		at Iowa	L 74–88	1–3	21 – Hicks	9 – Hicks	7 – Hicks	Carver–Hawkeye Arena (9,536); Iowa City, IA
November 24, 2023*; 9:30 p.m.		vs. San Diego; Acrisure Invitational semifinal	L 57–71	1–4	15 – Dominguez	12 – Laku	4 – Todd	Acrisure Arena (1,682); Thousand Palms, CA
November 25, 2023*; 7:00 p.m.		vs. UT Rio Grande Valley; Acrisure Invitational third-place game	W 75–58	2–4	18 – Hicks	15 – Dominguez	5 – Hicks	Acrisure Arena (893); Thousand Palms, CA
November 28, 2023*; 7:30 p.m., ESPN+		Jackson State	L 71–75	2–5	14 – Ford	6 – Dominguez	5 – Ford Jr.	First National Bank Arena (2,229); Jonesboro, AR
December 1, 2023*; 6:30 p.m., ESPN+		at Little Rock	L 66–77	2–6	20 – Dominguez	7 – Dominguez	2 – 2 tied	Jack Stephens Center (2,613); Little Rock, AR
December 4, 2023*; 7:00 p.m., SECN		at Alabama	L 65–89	2–7	15 – Todd	7 – Nelson	3 – Hicks	Coleman Coliseum (9,703); Tuscaloosa, AL
December 9, 2023*; 2:30 p.m., ESPN+		UAB	W 87–68	3–7	17 – Nelson	10 – Dominguez	7 – Fields	First National Bank Arena (2,699); Jonesboro, AR
December 13, 2023*; 7:00 p.m., ACCN		at Louisville	W 75–63	4–7	20 – Fields	10 – Dominguez	8 – Fields	KFC Yum! Center (10,401); Louisville, KY
December 20, 2023*; 6:30 p.m., ESPN+		at Belmont	L 70–74	4–8	18 – Dominguez	9 – Nelson	5 – 2 tied	Curb Event Center (2,052); Nashville, TN
Sun Belt Conference regular season
December 30, 2023; 1:00 p.m., ESPN+		at Georgia State	L 90–91	4–9 (0–1)	21 – Felts	6 – Lual	6 – Fields	GSU Convocation Center (1,644); Atlanta, GA
January 4, 2024; 7:00 p.m., ESPN+		Georgia Southern	W 109–83	5–9 (1–1)	26 – Dominguez	12 – Dominguez	8 – Todd	First National Bank Arena (1,652); Jonesboro, AR
January 6, 2024; 2:00 p.m., ESPN+		Old Dominion	W 90–75	6–9 (2–1)	16 – Dominguez	11 – Dominguez	10 – Fields	First National Bank Arena (2,193); Jonesboro, AR
January 11, 2024; 7:30 p.m., ESPN+		Texas State	W 85–82	7–9 (3–1)	35 – Fields	11 – Nelson	10 – Fields	First National Bank Arena (3,023); Jonesboro, AR
January 13, 2024; 2:30 p.m., ESPN+		Louisiana	L 77–84	7–10 (3–2)	19 – Fields	8 – Nelson	3 – 2 tied	First National Bank Arena (2,681); Jonesboro, AR
January 17, 2024; 7:00 p.m., ESPN+		at Southern Miss	L 66–69	7–11 (3–3)	16 – Fields	12 – Dominguez	9 – Fields	Reed Green Coliseum (4,583); Hattiesburg, MS
January 20, 2024; 4:15 p.m., ESPN+		at Texas State	W 79–72	8–11 (4–3)	17 – Felts	9 – Dominguez	3 – 3 tied	Strahan Arena (2,042); San Marcos, TX
January 26, 2024; 4:00 p.m., ESPN+		at Louisiana; Rescheduled from January 25	L 75–81	8–12 (4–4)	23 – Todd	8 – Dominguez	4 – Fields	Cajundome (1,874); Lafayette, LA
January 28, 2024; 1:00 p.m., ESPN+		at Louisiana-Monroe	L 82–85 ^{OT}	8–13 (4–5)	20 – Ford	12 – Ford	10 – Fields	Fant-Ewing Coliseum (1,376); Monroe, LA
January 31, 2024; 7:30 p.m., ESPN+		Southern Miss	W 78–71	9–13 (5–5)	27 – Fields	12 – Nelson	8 – Fields	First National Bank Arena (2,032); Jonesboro, AR
February 3, 2024; 2:30 p.m., ESPN+		Louisiana-Monroe	W 95–80	10–13 (6–5)	22 – Fields	10 – Nelson	13 – Fields	First National Bank Arena (2,743); Jonesboro, AR
February 7, 2024; 7:00 p.m., ESPN+		James Madison	L 73–77	10–14 (6–6)	18 – Todd	11 – Hicks	7 – Todd	First National Bank Arena (3,824); Jonesboro, AR
February 10, 2024*; 2:00 p.m., ESPN+		Ohio; MAC–SBC Challenge	W 100–87	11–14	20 – Todd	7 – Todd	11 – Fields	First National Bank Arena (2,267); Jonesboro, AR
February 15, 2024; 7:30 p.m., ESPN+		at Troy	W 82–71	12–14 (7–6)	19 – Todd	12 – Nelson	3 – Fields	Trojan Arena (4,434); Troy, AL
February 17, 2024; 3:30 p.m., ESPN+		at South Alabama	W 76–73	13–14 (8–6)	21 – Todd	15 – Nelson	4 – Hicks	Mitchell Center (1,723); Mobile, AL
February 22, 2024; 8:00 p.m., ESPNU		Troy	W 79–71	14–14 (9–6)	17 – Todd	12 – Hicks	9 – Fields	First National Bank Arena (5,107); Jonesboro, AR
February 24, 2024; 2:30 p.m., ESPN+		South Alabama	W 95–78	15–14 (10–6)	23 – Ford	6 – Ford	11 – Fields	First National Bank Arena (4,178); Jonesboro, AR
February 28, 2024; 6:30 p.m., ESPN+		at Coastal Carolina	W 71–60	16–14 (11–6)	16 – Nelson	12 – Nelson	5 – Fields	HTC Center (1,144); Conway, SC
March 1, 2024; 5:30 p.m., ESPN+		at Appalachian State	L 57–80	16–15 (11–7)	14 – Todd	10 – Nelson	2 – 3 tied	Holmes Center (7,074); Boone, NC
Sun Belt tournament
March 9, 2024; 2:00 p.m., ESPN+	(4)	vs. (5) Louisiana; Quarterfinals	W 89–62	17–15	23 – Hicks	8 – Nelson	4 – Todd	Pensacola Bay Center (2,059); Pensacola, FL
March 10, 2024; 5:00 p.m., ESPN+	(4)	vs. (1) Appalachian State; Semifinals	W 67–65	18–15	23 – Fields	13 – Nelson	6 – Fields	Pensacola Bay Center (1,621); Pensacola, FL
March 11, 2024; 6:00 p.m., ESPN	(4)	vs. (2) James Madison; Championship	L 71–91	18–16	24 – Nelson	12 – Nelson	5 – 2 tied	Pensacola Bay Center (2,548); Pensacola, FL
CBI
March 23, 2024; 12:00 p.m., FloHoops	(4)	vs. (13) Bethune–Cookman; First round	W 86–85	19–16	21 – Hicks	9 – Hicks	6 – Fields	Ocean Center; Daytona Beach, FL
March 25, 2024; 1:00 p.m., FloHoops	(4)	vs. (5) Montana; Quarterfinals	W 74–61	20–16	17 – Nelson	12 – Nelson	6 – Fields	Ocean Center; Daytona Beach, FL
March 26, 2024; 6:00 p.m., ESPN2	(4)	vs. (1) High Point; Semifinals	L 80–81	20–17	25 – Nelson	15 – Nelson	7 – Fields	Ocean Center; Daytona Beach, FL
*Non-conference game. ^{#}Rankings from AP poll. (#) Tournament seedings in parentheses. All times are in Central.
