= 2023–24 Ohio Bobcats men's basketball team =

American college basketball season

2023–24 Ohio Bobcats men's basketball
- Conference: Mid-American Conference
- Record: 20–13 (13–5 MAC)
- Head coach: Jeff Boals (5th season)
- Assistant coaches: Lamar Thornton (5th season); Kyle Barlow (5th season); Lee Martin (4th season)
- Home arena: Convocation Center

2023–24 Mid-American Conference men's basketball standings
	Conf.				Overall
Team	W		L	PCT	W		L	PCT
Toledo	14	–	4	.778	20	–	12	.625
Akron †	13	–	5	.722	24	–	11	.686
Ohio	13	–	5	.722	20	–	13	.606
Central Michigan	12	–	6	.667	18	–	14	.563
Bowling Green	10	–	8	.556	20	–	14	.588
Western Michigan	9	–	9	.500	12	–	20	.375
Miami (OH)	9	–	9	.500	15	–	17	.469
Kent State	8	–	10	.444	17	–	17	.500
Ball State	7	–	11	.389	15	–	16	.484
Eastern Michigan	6	–	12	.333	13	–	18	.419
Northern Illinois	5	–	13	.278	11	–	20	.355
Buffalo	2	–	16	.111	4	–	27	.129
† 2024 MAC tournament winner

The 2023–24 Ohio University Bobcats men's basketball team represented Ohio University for the 2023–24 NCAA Division I men's basketball season. The Bobcats were led by fifth-year head coach Jeff Boals, who was a 1995 graduate of Ohio University. They play their home games at the Convocation Center in Athens, Ohio as a member of the Mid-American Conference. They finished 6–7 in non-conference play and started 1–3 in conference play. They rallied to win 12 of their final 14 conference games to finish the regular season 19–12 with a 13–5 in MAC play to finish tied for 2nd place. They defeated Western Michigan in the first round of the MAC tournament and lost to Akron in the second round

== Previous season ==
The Bobcats started the 2022–23 season slowly but recovered to win seven out of their last nine regular season games to head into the MAC tournament at 18–13 as the fifth seed with a 10–8 conference record. They defeated Ball State in the first round of the MAC tournament before losing to top-seeded Toledo to finish 19–14.

== Offseason ==
Ohio avoided significant losses to the transfer portal in that only Olumide Adelodun, who averaged 5.5 minutes per game, entered the portal.

=== Departures ===
Departures
Name	Number	Pos.	Height	Weight	Year	Hometown	Reason
Ben Roderick	3	F	6'5"	205	Senior	Powell, Ohio	Graduated
Dwight Wilson III	4	F	6'8"	250	Grad. Student	Tallahassee, Florida	Graduated, Exhausted eligibility
Olumide Adelodun	5	G	6'6"	215	Sophomore	Calgary, Alberta	Transferred to Winona State
Devon Baker	22	G	6'2"	190	Senior	Dayton, Ohio	Graduated, Exhausted eligibility

=== Incoming transfers ===
Incoming transfers
Name	Number	Pos.	Height	Weight	Year	Hometown	Reason
Shereef Mitchell	4	G	6'1"	170	Junior	Omaha, Nebraska	Transferred from Creighton. Will have two years of eligibility remaining.
Ike Cornish	20	F	6'6"	185	Sophomore	Baltimore, Maryland	Transferred from Maryland. Will have three years of eligibility remaining.

=== Recruiting class ===
College recruiting information
Name	Hometown	School	Height	Weight	Commit date
Ben Nicol; SF	Charleston, WV	George Washington	6 ft 7 in (2.01 m)	205 lb (93 kg)	07/19/2023
Ben Nicol; SF	Recruit ratings: Scout: Rivals: 247Sports: (NR)				
Overall recruit ranking:
Note: In many cases, Scout, Rivals, 247Sports, On3, and ESPN may conflict in their listings of height and weight.; In these cases, the average was taken. ESPN grades are on a 100-point scale.; Sources: "2023 Team Ranking". Rivals.

== Preseason ==
On November 1, 2023, the MAC released the preseason coaches poll. Ohio was picked to finish third in the MAC regular season. Ohio placed Jaylin Hunter on the preseason all-MAC team first team and AJ Brown on the second team.

=== Preseason rankings ===
MAC preseason poll
Predicted finish	Team	Votes (1st place)
1	Akron	121 (11)
2	Kent State	104
3	Ohio	102 (1)
4	Toledo	93
5	Northern Illinois	82
T6	Bowling Green	64
T6	Miami	64
8	Ball State	55
9	Buffalo	38
10	Western Michigan	33
11	Eastern Michigan	22
12	Central Michigan	14

MAC Tournament Champions: Akron (9), Kent State (1), Ohio (1), Toledo (1)

=== Preseason All-MAC ===
Preseason All-MAC teams
Team	Player	Position	Year
1st	Jaylin Hunter	G	Sr.
2nd	AJ Brown	G	So.

== Roster ==
2023–24 Ohio Bobcats men's basketball team
Players
Coaches

Pos.	#	Name	Height	Weight	Year	Previous school	Hometown
G	0	Ajay Sheldon	6 ft 1 in (1.85 m)	185 lb (84 kg)	So	Dublin Coffman	Dublin, Ohio
G	1	Elmore James	6 ft 3 in (1.91 m)	205 lb (93 kg)	So	Brush	Cleveland, Ohio
G	2	Miles Brown	6 ft 1 in (1.85 m)	180 lb (82 kg)	GS	Northstar Christian	Rochester, New York
G	3	AJ Brown	6 ft 4 in (1.93 m)	195 lb (88 kg)	So	Orlando Christian Prep	Orlando, Florida
G	4	Shereef Mitchell	6 ft 1 in (1.85 m)	170 lb (77 kg)	GS	Sunrise Christian Academy; Creighton	Omaha, NE
F	5	Ben Nicol (redshirt)	6 ft 7 in (2.01 m)	208 lb (94 kg)	Fr	George Washington	Charleston, West Virginia
F	10	Aidan Hadaway	6 ft 8 in (2.03 m)	190 lb (86 kg)	So	Lafayette	Lafayette, Georgia
C	11	Gabe Wiznitzer	6 ft 11 in (2.11 m)	240 lb (109 kg)	Sr	Hargrave Military Academy; Louisville	Walhalla, South Carolina
G	12	Jaylin Hunter	6 ft 0 in (1.83 m)	195 lb (88 kg)	Sr	East Catholic; Old Dominion	Manchester, Connecticut
G	14	Ben Estis (W)	6 ft 1 in (1.85 m)	170 lb (77 kg)	RS Fr	Southlake Carroll	Southlake, Texas
G	15	Quinn Corna (W)	6 ft 3 in (1.91 m)	170 lb (77 kg)	So	Upper Arlington	Columbus, Ohio
F	21	IJ Ezuma	6 ft 8 in (2.03 m)	240 lb (109 kg)	RS So	Hargrave Military Academy	Raleigh, North Carolina
F	23	AJ Clayton	6 ft 8 in (2.03 m)	225 lb (102 kg)	Jr	Philo	Roseville, Ohio
G/F	24	Ike Cornish	6 ft 6 in (1.98 m)	190 lb (86 kg)	RS So	Legacy Charter; Maryland	Baltimore, Maryland

Head coach

- Jeff Boals (Ohio)

Assistant coach(es)

- Lamar Thornton (Ohio Dominican)
- Kyle Barlow (Concordia–Ann Arbor)
- Lee Martin (Catawba)

Legend

- (C) Team captain
- (S) Suspended
- (I) Ineligible
- (W) Walk-on
- Injured
- Current redshirt

Roster
Last update: September 29, 2023

=== Support Staff ===
2022-23 Ohio Bobcats Support Staff
- Jake Ness - Director of Basketball Operations
- Mike Cifliku - Video Coordinator
- Casey Crawford - Graduate Assistant
- Sara Legarsky - Senior Director of Athletics Communications (Men's Basketball, Field Hockey, Swimming and Diving, Softball)
- Tyler Congrove - Associate Athletic Trainer (Men's Basketball, Soccer, Men's Golf, Women's Golf)
- Jessica Arquette - Ohio Athletics Sports Dietitian
- Kaitlyn Michener - Nutritionist
- Hannah Rastatter - Nutritionist

== Schedule and results ==
Date time, TV	Rank^{#}	Opponent^{#}	Result	Record	High points	High rebounds	High assists	Site (attendance) city, state
Exhibition
November 2, 2023*; 7:00 p.m.		Otterbein	W 67–49	–	13 – Hunter	–	–	Convocation Center; Athens, OH
Non-conference regular season
November 8, 2023*; 7:00 p.m., ESPN+		Troy; MAC-SBC Challenge	W 88–70	1–0	24 – A. Brown	7 – Wiznitzer	4 – Hunter	Convocation Center (4,744); Athens, OH
November 11, 2023*; 6:00 p.m., ESPN+		at Cleveland State	L 78–82	1–1	15 – Mitchell	6 – Tied	7 – Hunter	Wolstein Center (2,399); Cleveland, OH
November 18, 2023*; 2:00 p.m., ESPN+		Detroit Mercy	W 71–52	2–1	18 – Clayton	10 – Hunter	6 – Hunter	Convocation Center (4,411); Athens, OH
November 24, 2023*; 7:00 p.m., FloSports		vs. George Washington; Nassau Championship quarterfinals	L 94–99 ^{2OT}	2–2	25 – Hunter	12 – Clayton	5 – Hunter	Baha Mar Convention Center (277); Nassau, Bahamas
November 25, 2023*; 1:30 p.m., FloSports		vs. Middle Tennessee; Nassau Championship	W 80–68	3–2	19 – Hunter	4 – Tied	3 – Tied	Baha Mar Convention Center (241); Nassau, Bahamas
November 26, 2023*; TBA, FloSports		vs. Brown; Nassau Championship	W 82–77	4–2	24 – Mitchell	8 – James	4 – James	Baha Mar Convention Center (251); Nassau, Bahamas
December 2, 2023*; 2:00 p.m., ESPN+		Delaware	W 74–73	5–2	21 – James	7 – Hadaway	3 – Hunter	Convocation Center (4,512); Athens, OH
December 6, 2023*; 7:00 p.m., ESPN+		Youngstown State	L 72–78	5–3	17 – Mitchell	10 – James	5 – Hunter	Convocation Center (3,799); Athens, OH
December 9, 2023*; 4:00 p.m., ESPN+		Marshall	L 69–74	5–4	19 – Hunter	9 – Clayton	5 – Hunter	Convocation Center (4,623); Athens, OH
December 18, 2023*; 7:00 p.m., ESPN+		Defiance	W 108–28	6–4	17 – Clayton	8 – Wiznitzer	9 – Hunter	Convocation Center (3,108); Athens, OH
December 22, 2023*; 8:00 p.m., ESPN+		at Austin Peay	L 67–71	6–5	14 – Mitchell	10 – Hadaway	5 – Hadaway	F&M Bank Arena (3,031); Clarksville, TN
December 30, 2023*; 1:30 p.m., ESPN+		vs. Davidson; Legends of Basketball Showcase	L 69–72	6–6	13 – Clayton	9 – M. Brown	7 – Hunter	Rocket Mortgage FieldHouse; Cleveland, OH
MAC regular season
January 2, 2024; 7:00 p.m., ESPNU		Toledo	L 77–86	6–7 (0–1)	17 – James	8 – James	5 – M. Brown	Convocation Center (4,016); Athens, OH
January 6, 2024; 2:00 p.m., ESPN+		Northern Illinois	W 78–66	7–7 (1–1)	23 – Clayton	8 – Hunter	6 – Tied	Convocation Center (3,802); Athens, OH
January 9, 2024; 7:00 p.m., ESPN+		at Bowling Green	L 78–83	7–8 (1–2)	19 – James	7 – Hadaway	4 – Clayton	Stroh Center (1,982); Bowling Green, OH
January 13, 2024; 12:00 p.m., ESPN+		at Western Michigan	L 79–81	7–9 (1–3)	15 – Clayton	5 – M. Brown	3 – Tied	University Arena (1,650); Kalamazoo, MI
January 16, 2023; 7:00 p.m., ESPN+		Central Michigan	W 73–61	8–9 (2–3)	19 – Hunter	10 – Clayton	8 – Hunter	Convocation Center (4,608); Athens, OH
January 20, 2024; 4:00 p.m., ESPN+		Eastern Michigan	W 85–67	9–9 (3–3)	20 – Hadaway	9 – M. Brown	5 – Tied	Convocation Center (5,547); Athens, OH
January 23, 2024; 7:00 p.m., ESPN+		at Akron	L 58–67	9–10 (3–4)	15 – Mitchell	7 – Mitchell	3 – Hunter	James A. Rhodes Arena (2,604); Akron, OH
January 26, 2024; 6:30 p.m., CBSSN		at Kent State	W 71–64	10–10 (4–4)	17 – Hunter	8 – Hadaway	5 – Tied	MAC Center (3,557); Kent, OH
January 30, 2024; 7:00 p.m., ESPN+		Buffalo	W 91–70	11–10 (5–4)	16 – Clayton	9 – Hunter	6 – Hunter	Convocation Center (3,652); Athens, OH
February 3, 2024; 2:00 p.m., ESPN+		Miami (OH)	W 78–69	12–10 (6–4)	22 – Hunter	8 – M. Brown	8 – Hunter	Convocation Center (9,018); Athens, OH
February 6, 2024; 7:00 p.m., ESPN+		at Ball State	W 84–79 ^{OT}	13–10 (7–4)	32 – Hunter	10 – Hadaway	5 – Hunter	Worthen Arena (3,218); Muncie, IN
February 10, 2024*; 3:00 p.m., ESPN+		at Arkansas State; MAC-SBC Challenge	L 87–100	13–11	20 – Hunter	5 – Clayton	8 – Hunter	First National Bank Arena (2,267); Jonesboro, AR
February 17, 2024; 2:00 p.m., ESPNU		at Toledo	L 83–85	13–12 (7–5)	22 – Clayton	8 – Hadaway	6 – Hunter	Savage Arena (5,079); Toledo, OH
February 20, 2024; 7:00 p.m., ESPN+		Kent State	W 63–57	14–12 (8–5)	13 – Hunter	9 – Mitchell	3 – Hunter	Convocation Center (4,132); Athens, OH
February 24, 2024; 3:30 p.m., ESPN+		at Northern Illinois	W 80–59	15–12 (9–5)	17 – Tied	5 – Tied	6 – Mitchell	Convocation Center (2,886); DeKalb, IL
February 27, 2024; 7:00 p.m., ESPN+		Akron	W 74–67	16–12 (10–5)	23 – Hunter	6 – Hadaway	6 – Hunter	Convocation Center (5,753); Athens, OH
March 1, 2024; 6:00 p.m., CBSSN		Bowling Green	W 66–59	17–12 (11–5)	16 – M. Brown	5 – Hunter	4 – Tied	Convocation Center (6,134); Athens, OH
March 5, 2024; 7:00 p.m., CBSSN		at Buffalo	W 78–66	18–12 (12–5)	23 – Tied	5 – Tied	5 – Hunter	Alumni Arena (2,140); Buffalo, NY
March 8, 2024; 7:00 p.m., ESPN+		at Miami (OH)	W 72–59	19–12 (13–5)	20 – Tied	8 – Mitchell	7 – Hunter	Millett Hall (3,506); Oxford, OH
MAC tournament
March 14, 2024; 6:30 p.m., ESPN+	(3)	vs. (7) Western Michigan; Quarterfinals	W 82–55	20–12	15 – Mitchell	8 – Tied	5 – Hunter	Rocket Mortgage FieldHouse (7,854); Cleveland, OH
March 15, 2024; 7:30 p.m., ESPN+	(3)	vs. (2) Akron; Semifinals	L 62–65	20–13	17 – Hunter	7 – Hadaway	4 – Mitchell	Rocket Mortgage FieldHouse (7,802); Cleveland, OH
*Non-conference game. ^{#}Rankings from AP Poll. (#) Tournament seedings in parentheses. All times are in Eastern Time.

== Statistics ==
=== Team Statistics ===
Final 2023–24 Statistics

Record	Ohio	OPP
Scoring	2551	2309
Scoring Average	77.30	69.97
Field goals – Att	901–1987	809–1904
3-pt. Field goals – Att	294–827	238–715
Free throws – Att	455–623	453–649
Rebounds	1153	1198
Assists	464	363
Turnovers	321	452
Steals	235	165
Blocked Shots	118	117

=== Player statistics ===
			Minutes		Scoring		Total FGs			3-point FGs			Free-Throws			Rebounds								
Player	GP	GS	Tot	Avg	Pts	Avg	FG	FGA	Pct	3FG	3FA	Pct	FT	FTA	Pct	Off	Def	Tot	Avg	A	PF	TO	Stl	Blk
Jaylin Hunter	33	33	1034	31.3	461	14.0	158	379	0.417	49	167	0.293	96	129	0.744	26	118	144	4.4	163	64	70	56	6
Shereef Mitchell	32	31	954	29.8	427	13.3	158	336	0.470	35	107	0.327	76	104	0.731	34	101	135	4.2	77	76	45	45	7
AJ Clayton	33	33	868	26.3	397	12.0	138	278	0.496	73	182	0.401	48	59	0.814	45	109	154	4.7	26	79	32	18	58
Aidan Hadaway	33	24	801	24.3	275	8.3	108	209	0.517	21	62	0.339	38	56	0.679	49	105	154	4.7	47	66	25	21	13
Elmore James	31	18	716	23.1	243	7.8	90	196	0.459	11	40	0.275	52	61	0.852	39	76	115	3.7	29	52	35	17	0
Miles Brown	23	17	653	28.4	223	9.7	69	168	0.411	32	76	0.421	53	67	0.791	13	75	88	3.8	43	40	31	35	3
Ajay Sheldon	33	0	527	16.0	171	5.2	56	115	0.487	38	82	0.463	21	34	0.618	19	34	53	1.6	34	57	25	24	6
Gabe Wiznitzer	33	0	462	14.0	122	3.7	48	94	0.511	1	4	0.250	25	41	0.610	30	73	103	3.1	21	67	24	4	22
Ike Cornish	32	0	354	11.1	121	3.8	37	100	0.370	19	57	0.333	28	36	0.778	16	32	48	1.5	11	32	13	7	1
AJ Brown	9	9	238	26.4	81	9.0	30	79	0.380	10	35	0.286	11	24	0.458	9	26	35	3.9	8	26	9	7	2
Ben Estis	7	0	36	5.1	16	2.3	5	17	0.294	1	8	0.125	5	8	0.625	3	4	7	1.0	3	2	1	1	0
Quinn Corna	7	0	31	4.4	14	2.0	4	16	0.250	4	7	0.571	2	4	0.500	3	2	5	0.7	2	1	0	0	0
Total	33	-	6675	-	2551	77.3	901	1987	0.453	294	827	0.356	455	623	0.730	333	820	1153	34.9	464	562	321	235	118
Opponents	33	-	6675	-	2309	70.0	809	1904	0.425	238	715	0.333	453	649	0.698	375	823	1198	36.3	363	560	452	165	117

Legend
GP	Games played	GS	Games started	Avg	Average per game
FG	Field-goals made	FGA	Field-goal attempts	Off	Offensive rebounds
Def	Defensive rebounds	A	Assists	TO	Turnovers
Blk	Blocks	Stl	Steals	High	Team high

=== Team and individual highs ===
==== Team Game Highs ====
Team Game Highs
Stat	High	Opponent	Date
Points	108	Defiance	December 18, 2023
Field goals made	42	Defiance	December 18, 2023
Field Goal Attempts	79	George Washington	November 24, 2023
3 Points Made	16	Defiance	December 18, 2023
3 Points Attempted	36	Defiance	December 18, 2023
Free throws Made	27	Troy	November 8, 2023
Free Throw Attempts	32	Troy	November 8, 2023
Rebounds	50	Defiance	December 18, 2023
Assists	31	Defiance	December 18, 2023
Steals	15	Defiance	December 18, 2023
Blocked Shots	8	Delaware	December 2, 2023
Turnovers	18	George Washington	November 24, 2023
Fouls	23	Davidson	December 20, 2023

==== Individual Game Highs ====
Individual Game Highs
Stat	High	Player	Opponent	Date
Points	32	Jaylin Hunter	Ball State	February 6, 2024
Field goals made	10	AJ Brown \ Jaylin Hunter	Troy \ Ball State	November 8, 2023 \ February 6, 2024
Field Goal Attempts	22	Jaylin Hunter	George Washington	November 24, 2023
3 Points Made	7	AJ Clayton	Buffalo	March 5, 2024
3 Points Attempted	13	AJ Clayton	Buffalo	March 5, 2024
Free throws Made	10	Jaylin Hunter	Ball State	February 6, 2024
Free Throw Attempts	12	Jaylin Hunter	Ball State	February 6, 2024
Rebounds	12	AJ Clayton	George Washington	November 24, 2023
Assists	9	Jaylin Hunter	Defiance	December 18, 2023
Steals	5	Shareef Mitchell	Western Michigan	March 14, 2024
Blocked Shots	5	AJ Clayton	George Washington	November 24, 2023
Turnovers	6	Jaylin Hunter \ Shareef Mitchell	George Washington \ Toledo	November 24, 2023 \ January 2, 2024
Fouls	5	Various		

== Awards and honors ==
=== Weekly Awards ===
Weekly Award Honors
Honors	Player	Position	Date Awarded	Source
MAC player of the week	Elmore James	G	December 4	
MAC player of the week	Jaylin Hunter	G	February 12	
MAC player of the week	Shareef Mitchel	G	March 11	

=== All-MAC Awards ===
Postseason All-MAC teams
Team	Player	Position	Year
All-MAC 2nd Team	Jaylin Hunter	G	Sr.
All-MAC 3rd Team	AJ Clayton	F	Jr.
