= List of NCAA Division I men's basketball career 3-point scoring leaders =

A three-point field goal (also known as a "three-pointer" or "3-pointer") is a field goal in a basketball game, made from beyond the three-point line, a designated arc radiating from the basket. A successful attempt is worth three points, in contrast to the two points awarded for shots made inside the three-point line. The statistic was first recognized in the 1986–87 season when 3-point field goals were officially instituted by the NCAA. From the 1986–87 season through the 2007–08 season, the three-point perimeter was marked at 19 ft 9 in (6.02 m) for both men's and women's college basketball. On May 3, 2007, the NCAA men's basketball rules committee passed a measure to extend the distance of the men's three-point line back to 20 ft 9 in (6.32 m); the women's line remained at the original distance until it was moved to match the then-current men's distance effective in 2011–12. On June 5, 2019, the NCAA men's rules committee voted to extend the men's three-point line to the FIBA distance of 6.75 meters (22 ft 2 in), effective in 2019–20 in Division I and 2020–21 in lower NCAA divisions. The women's line remained at 20 ft 9 in until being moved to the FIBA distance in 2021–22.

The all-time leader in three-point field goals made and attempts is Antoine Davis of Detroit Mercy, who made 588 threes in 1,566 attempts. Only one player in the top 25 all-time earned his way onto this list in only three seasons: Stephen Curry of Davidson played from 2006–07 through 2008–09 but left for the National Basketball Association (NBA) after his junior season. Curry also played in the fewest games (104) out of all of the other players in the top 25 and currently ranks 22nd all-time.

== Key ==
Pos.	G	F	C	3PM	3PA	3P%	Ref.
Position	Guard	Forward	Center	3-pointers made	3-pointers attempted	3-point field goal %	References

^	Player still competing in NCAA Division I
*	Inducted into the Naismith Memorial Basketball Hall of Fame
Team (X)	Denotes the number of times a player from that team appears on the list
‡	Player received at least one hardship waiver (also known as a "medical redshirt") from the NCAA
C	Player was active in the 2020–21 season, benefiting from the NCAA's blanket COVID-19 eligibility waiver

== Top 25 3-point field goal leaders ==
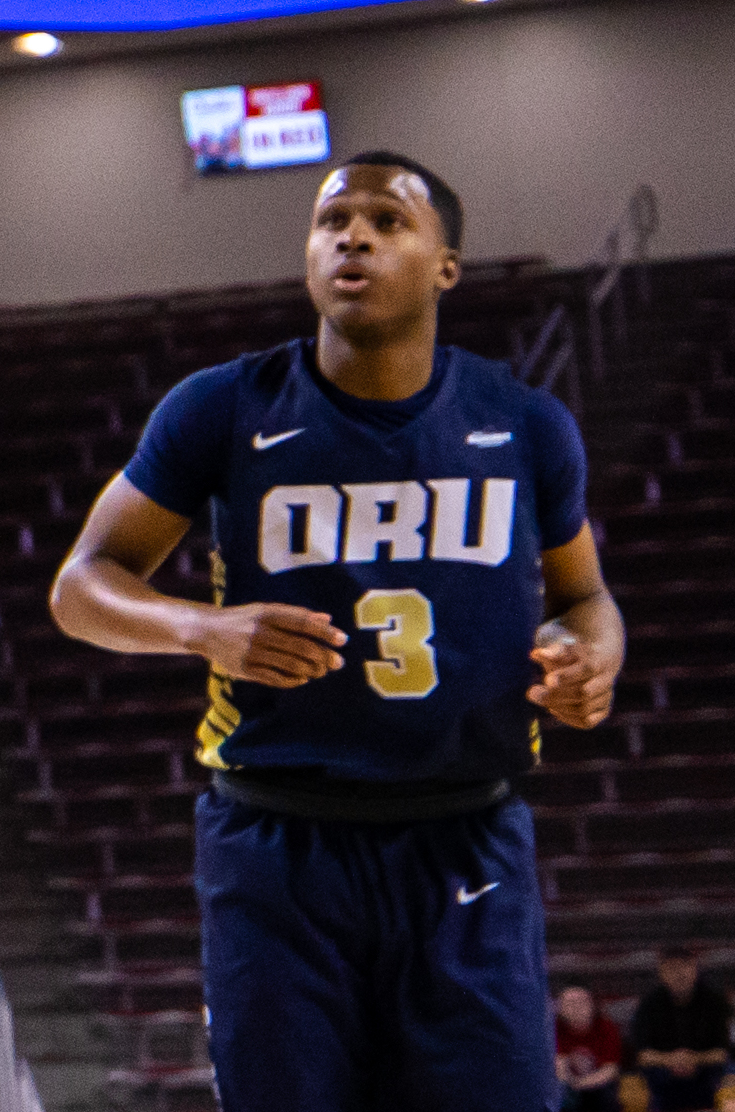
Max Abmas made 512 three-pointers.

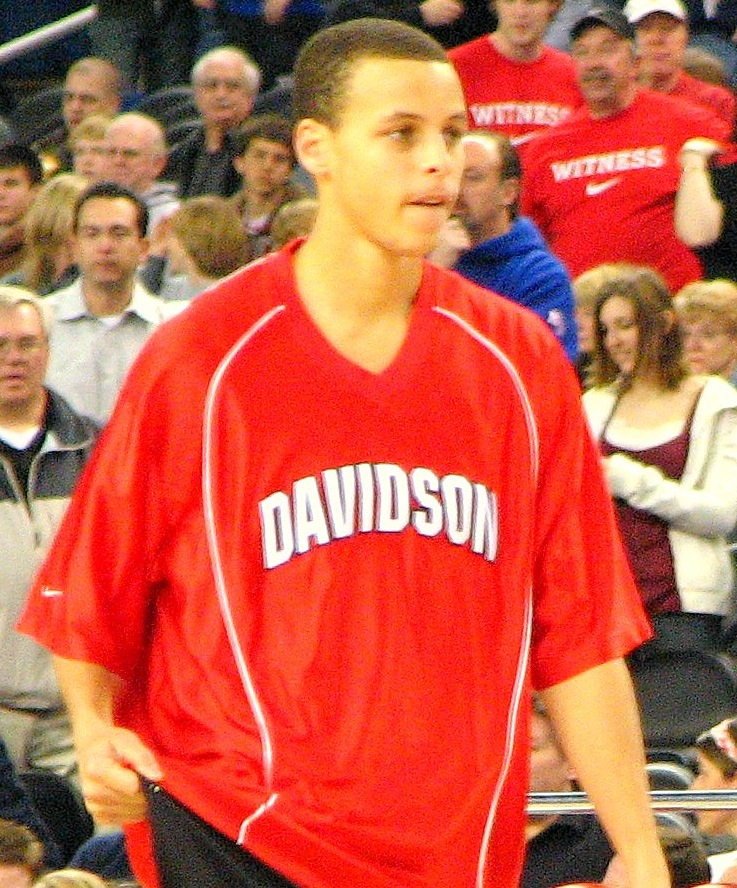
Stephen Curry finished with 414 in three seasons.

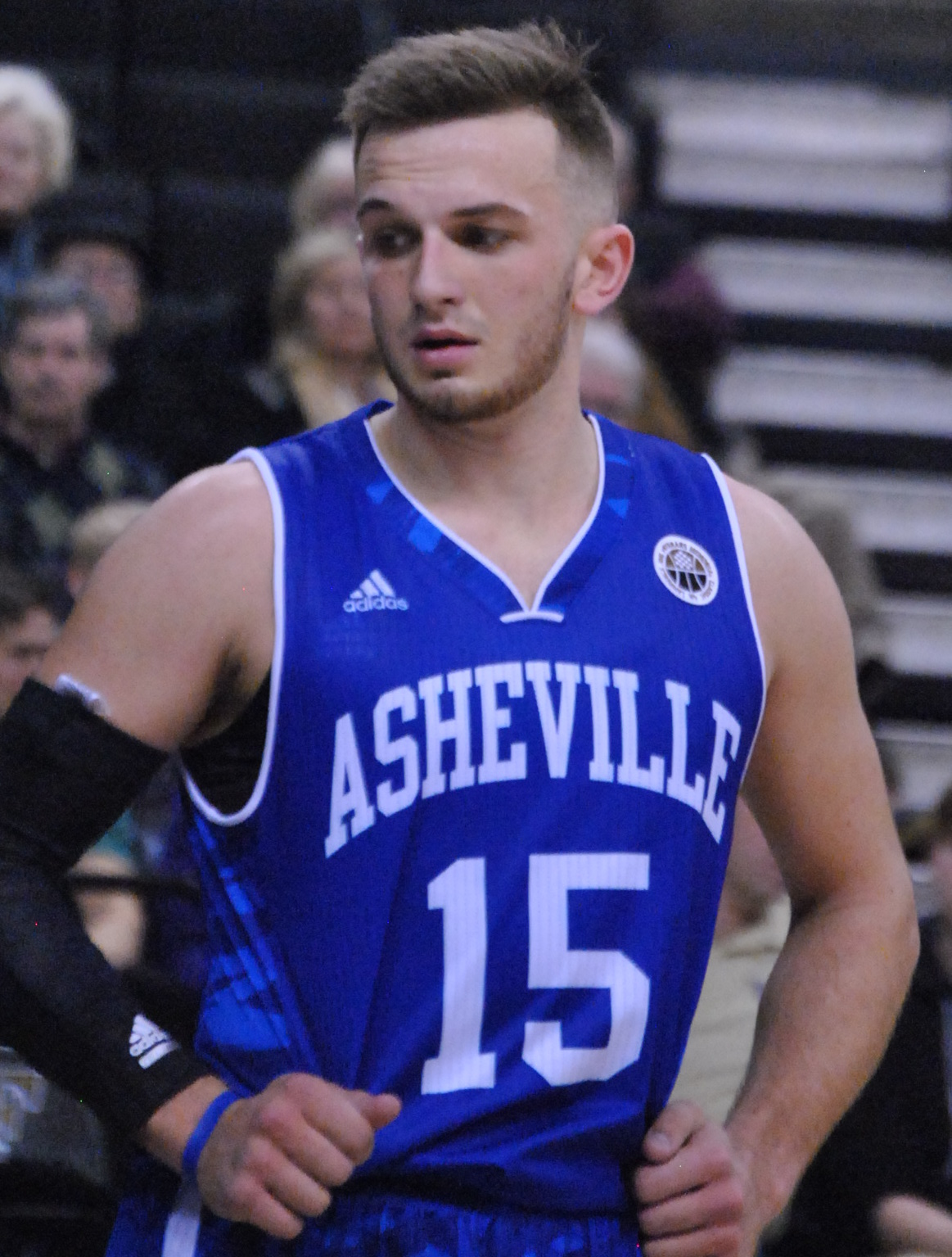
Andrew Rowsey made 404 while playing for two schools.

Player	Pos.	Team	Games played	Career start	Career end	3PM	3PA	3P%	Ref.
Antoine Davis^{C}	G	Detroit Mercy	144	2018	2023	588	1,566	37.5	
Darius McGhee^{C}	G	Liberty	168	2018	2023	528	1,375	38.4	
Max Abmas^{C}	G	Oral Roberts / Texas	157	2019	2024	512	1,337	38.3	
Fletcher Magee	G	Wofford	134	2015	2019	509	1,169	43.5	
Travis Bader	G	Oakland	137	2010	2014	504	1,246	40.5	
Kamdyn Curfman^{C}	G	VMI / Marshall	155	2019	2024	463	1,218	38.0	
Cameron Tyson^{C}	G	Idaho / Houston / Seattle	146	2018	2024 (Note: Tyson's career spans six seasons, but he has only played in five. After playing one season at Idaho in 2018–19, he transferred to Houston, sitting out the 2019–20 season due to then-current NCAA transfer regulations. Because of additional year of eligibility granted by the NCAA to all student-athletes active during the 2020–21 season, Tyson had four years of eligibility remaining. He suited up for one season at Houston in 2020–21 before playing his final three years at Seattle.)	460	1,198	38.3	
JJ Redick	G	Duke	139	2002	2006	457	1,126	40.6	
Jordan Bohannon^{‡C}	G	Iowa	179	2016	2022	455	1,147	39.6	
David Holston	G	Chicago State	119	2005	2009	450	1,147	39.2	
Chris Clemons	G	Campbell	130	2015	2019	444	1,224	36.3	
Keydren Clark	G	Saint Peter's	118	2002	2006	435	1,192	36.5	
Markus Howard	G	Marquette	128	2016	2020	434	1,017	42.7	
Damon Lynn	G	NJIT	118	2013	2017	434	1,225	35.4	
Kevin Foster^{‡}	G	Santa Clara	133	2008	2013	431	1,184	36.4	
Tyler Hall	G	Montana State	126	2015	2019	431	1,077	40.0	
Chris Lofton	G	Tennessee	128	2004	2008	431	1,021	42.2	
Nijel Pack^{‡C}	G	Kansas State / Miami (Florida) / Oklahoma (2)	157	2020	2026	429	1,036	41.4	
Umoja Gibson^{‡C}	G	North Texas / Oklahoma / DePaul	161	2017	2023	428	1,071	40.0	
Gibson Jimerson^{‡C}	G	Saint Louis	166	2019	2025 (Note: Jimerson benefited from both a redshirt-shortened season and the NCAA's blanket COVID-19 eligibility waiver to play six seasons.)	422	1,091	38.7	
Chase Johnston^{‡C}	G	Stetson / Florida Gulf Coast / High Point	166	2020	2026	418	1,047	39.9	
Akeem Richmond	G	Rhode Island / East Carolina	139	2009	2014 (Note: Richmond's career spanned five seasons, but he only played in four. After playing two seasons at Rhode Island, he transferred to East Carolina, sitting out the 2011–12 season due to then-current NCAA transfer regulations.)	416	1,082	38.4	
Stephen Curry	G	Davidson	104	2006	2009	414	1,004	41.2	
Curtis Staples	G	Virginia	122	1994	1998	413	1,079	38.2	
Jack Leasure	G	Coastal Carolina	117	2004	2008	411	1,009	40.7	
