= 2023–24 NCAA Division I men's basketball season =

Basketball season

- Preseason AP No. 1: Kansas Jayhawks
- Regular season: November 6, 2023 – March 17, 2024
- NCAA Tournament: 2024
- Tournament dates: March 19 – April 8, 2024
- National Championship: State Farm Stadium; Glendale, Arizona
- NCAA Champions: UConn Huskies
- Other champions: Seton Hall Pirates (NIT), Seattle Redhawks (CBI), Norfolk State Spartans (CIT)
- Player of the Year (Naismith, Wooden): Zach Edey, Purdue Boilermakers

The 2023–24 NCAA Division I men's basketball season began on November 6, 2023. The regular season ended on March 17, 2024, with the 2024 NCAA Division I men's basketball tournament beginning with the First Four on March 19 and ending with the championship game at State Farm Stadium in Glendale, Arizona, on April 8.

== Rule changes ==
On May 5, 2023, the NCAA Basketball Rules Committee proposed a suite of rule changes for the 2023–24 season. These changes were approved by the Playing Rules Oversight Panel during its June 8 conference call.

- A defender near the basket must be in position to draw a charge before the offensive player plants his foot to jump during a field goal attempt. If the defender arrives after the shooter has planted his foot, the officials are to call a blocking foul if contact occurs.
- Prerecorded or live video can be transmitted to the bench area during the game, on an optional basis. This had been an experimental rule since 2021–22, but is now permanent.
- Officials will be able to review basket interference or goaltending calls during the next media timeout to ensure the call's accuracy, as long as they were made during play. Review is immediate if a foul is called on a shot that ended with basket interference or goaltending.
- Non-student bench personnel will be allowed to serve as peacekeepers in any altercation.
- If a coach requests a review of an out-of-bounds play in the last two minutes, that team will be charged a timeout if the challenge is unsuccessful.
- The shot clock will reset to 20 seconds for all offensive rebounds when the original shot has touched the rim.
- If a player is called for a foul, and replay officials see that the foul is the direct result of a flagrant foul against the player who was originally charged with the foul, officials can rescind the foul on the victim of the flagrant foul.
- A timeout can be granted when a player has possession of the ball while airborne.
- A player will be disqualified if he commits three flagrant 1 fouls in a game, regardless of his overall foul count.
- Red and amber lights can now be placed on the backboard.
- Schools will no longer have to apply for a waiver to allow players to use religious headwear that is safe for competition.
- All jersey numbers from "0" to "99," including "00," will be allowed, although with the restriction that teams are allowed to use "0" or "00," but not both at the same time. It is the first time that players are allowed to wear the digits "6" through "9" on their uniforms since those digits were prohibited prior to the 1957–58 season as a means of simplifying referees' hand signals to the scorer's table after calling a foul.
- Conferences will be allowed to continue using an experimental rule that allows for media timeouts to be taken at the first dead ball after the 17-, 14-, 11-, 8-, and 4-minute marks of the second half. This rule may also be used in the 2024 NIT, subject to approval by the NCAA's NIT board.
- Also, subject to NIT board approval, the free-throw lane may be widened to 16 feet in the 2024 NIT.

== Season headlines ==
- March 8, 2023
  - Jim Boeheim retired as head coach at Syracuse after 47 seasons, ending with the Orange missing the 2023 NCAA tournament for only the 11th time in his coaching history. He finished his career at Syracuse with a 1,015–441 record; his 1,015 wins were 6th all time in NCAA history at the time of his retirement. He also led Syracuse to one national title, five Final Fours, ten Big East regular-season titles, and five Big East tournament titles, and he was Big East coach of the year four times and the 2010 Naismith, AP, NABC, Henry Iba and Sporting News coach of the year. Boeheim was inducted into the Naismith Memorial Basketball Hall of Fame in 2005, and the National Collegiate Basketball Hall of Fame in 2006.
- May 10 – The Northeast Conference (NEC) announced that Le Moyne would start a transition from Division II and join the conference on July 1.
- May 12 – The Ohio Valley Conference announced that Western Illinois would join from the Summit League effective July 1.
- May 24 – George Washington University announced that it would change its nickname from Colonials to Revolutionaries.
- July 20 – The Colonial Athletic Association announced it had changed its name to Coastal Athletic Association.
- July 27 – The Big 12 Conference announced that Colorado would rejoin the conference in 2024, after 13 seasons in the Pac-12 Conference.
- August 4
  - The Big Ten Conference announced that Oregon and Washington would leave the Pac-12 to join the Big Ten in 2024.
  - The Big 12 announced that Arizona, Arizona State, and Utah would leave the Pac-12 to join the Big 12 in 2024.
- September 1 – The Atlantic Coast Conference announced that California, SMU, and Stanford would join the conference in 2024. California and Stanford left the Pac-12, and SMU left the American Athletic Conference.
- September 6 – The ASUN Conference began to once again refer to itself by its former name, Atlantic Sun Conference, while still using ASUN as its official abbreviation.
- September 8 – The ASUN announced that the University of West Georgia would transition from Division II and be admitted as a full member of the conference, effective July 1, 2024.
- September 27 – The Grand Sierra Resort, the city of Reno, Nevada, and the University of Nevada, Reno jointly announced that the casino resort planned a 10-year, $1-billion-plus expansion. As part of the project, the resort would build a new arena for the Nevada men's basketball team. The university's current arena, the Lawlor Events Center, will continue to be the home of Nevada women's basketball, The new 10,000-seat venue is tentatively set to open in 2026.
- October 4 – The Division I Council announced changes to the transfer window for all sports. In men's and women's basketball, the transfer portal now opens on the day after Selection Sunday and remains open for 45 days, down from the previous 60.
- October 23 – The AP released its preseason All-America team. Reigning national player of the year Zach Edey of Purdue was the only unanimous choice, joined by guard Tyler Kolek of Marquette, forward Kyle Filipowski of Duke, center Hunter Dickinson of Kansas, and center Armando Bacot of North Carolina.
- October 23 – The Metro Atlantic Athletic Conference (MAAC) announced that Merrimack and Sacred Heart would join from the NEC in July 2024.
- October 27 – The NCAA announced that conference regular season champions that do not win their conference tournaments or are not selected for the NCAA Division I men's basketball tournament, will no longer receive an automatic bid to the NIT. The NIT will now guarantee two teams, based on the NET Rankings from each of the six major conferences: ACC, Big East, Big Ten, Big 12, Pac-12, and SEC. The top two teams in the NET Rankings that do not qualify for the NCAA tournament from each conference regardless of their record, will be selected for the NIT. The twelve teams that are automatically selected will be guaranteed the ability to host a game for the first round. After the twelve teams have been selected, the NIT selection committee will select the twenty best teams that are available to participate in the NIT. Based on the selection committee's rankings, four of the twenty teams will be selected as one of the sixteen first round hosts and the NIT selection will defer to the first four teams out of the NCAA Division I men's basketball tournament.
- November 28 – Conference USA announced that Delaware would join from the Coastal Athletic Association in 2025.
- December 5 – The NEC announced that Chicago State would join from being the sole Independent in July 2024.
- December 20 – The two schools left behind in the mass exodus from the Pac-12, Oregon State and Washington State, were reported to be nearing a deal with the West Coast Conference (WCC) for affiliate membership in multiple sports, including men's and women's basketball. The arrangement, expected to be voted on by WCC member presidents in the coming days, would run for two years (through 2025–26), during which time the so-called "Pac-2" would be eligible for WCC championships and could represent the conference in NCAA championship events.
- December 22 – The reported deal between the "Pac-2" and the WCC became official, with Oregon State and Washington State joining as affiliate members in all non-football sports apart from baseball through 2025–26.
- February 29 – The Mid-American Conference (MAC) announced that UMass, currently a member of the Atlantic 10 Conference, would join the MAC for all sports starting July 1, 2025. This confirmed prior reporting by multiple media outlets, with The Athletic being the first to break the news.
- March 5 – The Dartmouth men's basketball team voted to unionize in an unprecedented step toward forming the first labor union for college athletes. The National Labor Relations Board supervised the election inside of in the school's human resources offices as the players voted 13–2 to join Service Employees International Union Local 560, which already represents some Dartmouth workers.
- March 25 – The Southland Conference announced that the University of Texas Rio Grande Valley (UTRGV) would join from the Western Athletic Conference on July 1, 2024.
- April 4 – The NEC announced that Mercyhurst University, a member of the Division II Pennsylvania State Athletic Conference, would start a transition to Division I and join the NEC on July 1, 2024.

=== Milestones and records ===
- During the season, the following players reached the 2,000 career point milestone – Maryland guard Jahmir Young, North Carolina center Armando Bacot, Colorado State guard Isaiah Stevens, Rice guard Travis Evee, Kentucky guard Antonio Reeves, UC Davis guard Elijah Pepper, Hofstra guard Tyler Thomas, Purdue center Zach Edey, Northern Kentucky guard Marques Warrick, Kansas center Hunter Dickinson, Oklahoma State guard John-Michael Wright, Duquesne guard Dae Dae Grant, Creighton guard Baylor Scheierman, Wright State guard Trey Calvin, Denver guard Tommy Bruner, Clemson guard Joseph Girard III, Northwestern guard Boo Buie, George Washington guard James Bishop IV, Wright State guard Tanner Holden, Nevada guard Jarod Lucas, Illinois forward Marcus Domask, Seattle guard Cameron Tyson, Arizona guard Caleb Love, Iowa forward Ben Krikke, Xavier guard Quincy Olivari, Wyoming forward Sam Griffin, Michigan State guard Tyson Walker, Alabama guard Mark Sears, California guard Jalen Cone, USC guard Boogie Ellis, NC State guard DJ Horne, Illinois guard Terrence Shannon Jr., North Carolina guard R. J. Davis, NC State forward D. J. Burns Auburn forward/center Johni Broome, Ohio State forward Jamison Battle and UConn guard Tristen Newton.
- November 26 – La Salle coach Fran Dunphy won his 600th career game, an 81–62 win over Coppin State. Dunphy accumulated all of his career victories for Philadelphia Big 5 programs, having previously coached Penn and Temple.
- December 21 – Elijah Pepper became the leading scorer in UC Davis program history. Scoring 21 points in an 80–57 win over UC Merced, Pepper passed Audwin Thomas, whose program record had stood since 1979.
- February 10 – Marques Warrick became the leading scorer in Northern Kentucky program history. Scoring 22 points in a 79–67 win over Detroit Mercy, Warrick passed Drew McDonald's record of 2,066, set in 2019.
- February 19 – Texas fifth-year senior Max Abmas scored his 3,000th career point, becoming just the 12th player in Division I men's basketball history to reach the milestone. He scored eight points in a 62–56 win over Kansas State to finish the game with 3,001.
- February 22 – Northwestern fifth-year senior Boo Buie surpassed John Shurna (2,038 points) as the school's all-time leading scorer in a 76–62 win over Michigan. Shurna's record had stood since 2012.
- March 16 – Zach Edey became Purdue's all-time leading scorer in the Boilermakers' Big Ten tournament semifinal loss to Wisconsin. He broke Rick Mount's record of 2,323, which had stood since 1970. Earlier in the season (February 18) Edey became the school's all-time leading rebounder, passing Joe Barry Carroll (1,148).

== Conference membership changes ==
Nineteen schools joined new conferences, became independents, or dropped athletics.

School	Former conference	New conference
BYU	WCC	Big 12
Campbell	Big South	CAA
Charlotte	CUSA	American
Cincinnati	American	Big 12
Florida Atlantic	CUSA	American
Hartford	Independent	CCC (Note: Then known as the Commonwealth Coast Conference; renamed as the Conference of New England in August 2024.) (D-III)
Houston	American	Big 12
Jacksonville State	ASUN	CUSA
Le Moyne	NE-10 (D-II)	NEC
Liberty	ASUN	CUSA
New Mexico State	WAC	CUSA
North Texas	CUSA	American
Rice	CUSA	American
St. Francis Brooklyn	NEC	None (dropped athletics)
Sam Houston	WAC	CUSA
UAB	CUSA	American
UCF	American	Big 12
UTSA	CUSA	American
Western Illinois	Summit	OVC

The 2023–24 season was the last for 20 Division I schools in their then-current conferences and two Division II schools in their then-current conferences before reclassification to Division I. It was also Chicago State's last season as a Division I independent.

School	2023–24 conference	Future conference
Arizona	Pac-12	Big 12
Arizona State	Pac-12	Big 12
California	Pac-12	ACC
Chicago State	Independent	NEC
Colorado	Pac-12	Big 12
Kennesaw State	ASUN	CUSA
Mercyhurst	PSAC (D-II)	NEC
Merrimack	NEC	MAAC
Oklahoma	Big 12	SEC
Oregon	Pac-12	Big Ten
Oregon State	Pac-12 (Note: The Pac-12 continues to technically exist with Oregon State and Washington State as the only members. It will resume play in 2026–27, with six confirmed new members and likely others.)	WCC
Sacred Heart	NEC	MAAC
SMU	AAC	ACC
Stanford	Pac-12	ACC
Stephen F. Austin	WAC	Southland
Texas	Big 12	SEC
UCLA	Pac-12	Big Ten
USC	Pac-12	Big Ten
Utah	Pac-12	Big 12
UTRGV	WAC	Southland
Washington	Pac-12	Big Ten
Washington State	Pac-12	WCC
West Georgia	Gulf South (D–II)	ASUN

In addition to the above changes, the Indiana University and Purdue University systems split IUPUI into separate IU- and Purdue-affiliated institutions at the end of the 2023–24 academic year, a move similar to the two systems' dissolution of their joint Fort Wayne campus in 2018. The IUPUI athletic program transferred to the new IU Indianapolis, maintaining IUPUI's memberships in Division I and the Horizon League. Shortly before the split became official, the IUPUI athletic website adopted a new brand of IU Indy.

== Arenas ==
=== New arenas ===
- Austin Peay left the on-campus Winfield Dunn Center for the new F&M Bank Arena in downtown Clarksville, Tennessee after 49 seasons. The new arena opened on July 15, 2023. The first basketball event in the new arena was a joint practice by the Peay men's and women's teams on October 26, 2023. This was followed by an 82–43 exhibition win against Tennessee Tech on November 1. The first official games were a men's and women's doubleheader on January 6, with the men defeating NAIA Life University 90–72 in the second game.
- Baylor left the Ferrell Center for the new Foster Pavilion. The Bears defeated Cornell 98–79 in the arena opener on January 2, 2024.
- Georgia Southern will leave the Hanner Fieldhouse for the new Jack and Ruth Ann Hill Convocation Center. The venue was scheduled to open in the early fall of 2023, but was delayed until the 2024–25 season.
- Longwood left Willett Hall for the new Joan Perry Brock Center; the venue opened on August 25, 2023. The team played its first game there on November 11, 2023, with a 95–43 win against NCAA Division III St. Mary's of Maryland.
- Vermont was originally slated to open the new Tarrant Event Center, the replacement for Patrick Gym, in 2021. However, the new arena has since been placed on indefinite hold. Construction was initially halted by COVID-19. With the Tarrant Center being part of a much larger upgrade of UVM's athletic and recreation facilities, UVM chose to prioritize a new student recreation center. Construction of the Tarrant Center is now being hampered by increased borrowing costs.

=== Arena of new D-I team ===
Le Moyne plays on campus on Ted Grant Court in the Le Moyne Events Center.

=== Arena name change ===
On January 18, the name of the Rothman Center, the home arena of Fairleigh Dickinson, was changed to the Bogota Savings Bank Center.

== Season outlook ==
The Top 25 from the AP and USA Today Coaching Polls.

=== Pre-season polls ===
AP
Ranking	Team
1	Kansas (46)
2	Duke (11)
3	Purdue (3)
4	Michigan State (1)
5	Marquette
6	UConn (2)
7	Houston
8	Creighton
9	Tennessee
10	Florida Atlantic
11	Gonzaga
12	Arizona
13	Miami (FL)
14	Arkansas
15	Texas A&M
16	Kentucky
17	San Diego State
18	Texas
19	North Carolina
20	Baylor
21	USC
22	Villanova
23	Saint Mary's
24	Alabama
25	Illinois

USA Today Coaches
Ranking	Team
1	Kansas (23)
2	Purdue (5)
3	Duke (3)
4	Michigan State
5	UConn (1)
6	Houston
7	Marquette
8	Creighton
9	Florida Atlantic
10	Tennessee
11	Arizona
12	Gonzaga
13	Miami (FL)
14	Arkansas
15	San Diego State
16	Kentucky
17	Baylor
18	Texas
19	Texas A&M
20	Villanova
21	North Carolina
22	USC
23	Saint Mary's
24	Alabama
25	UCLA

=== Final polls ===
AP
Ranking	Team
1	UConn (58)
2	Purdue
3т	Alabama
3т	Houston
5	Tennessee
6	Illinois
7	North Carolina
8	Iowa State
9	Duke
10	NC State
11	Arizona
12	Marquette
13	Creighton
14	Clemson
15	Gonzaga
16	Baylor
17	San Diego State
18	Auburn
19	Kansas
20	Kentucky
21	Saint Mary's
22	Utah State
23	Washington State
24	South Carolina
25	Dayton

USA Today Coaches
Ranking	Team
1	UConn (31)
2	Purdue
3	Houston
4	Alabama
5	Tennessee
6	North Carolina
7	Illinois
8	Iowa State
9	Duke
10	Creighton
11	Marquette
12	Arizona
13	NC State
14	Baylor
15	Clemson
16	Gonzaga
17	Auburn
18	San Diego State
19	Kentucky
20	Utah State
21	Kansas
22	Saint Mary's
23	South Carolina
24	Washington State
25	Texas Tech

== Top 10 matchups ==
Rankings reflect the AP poll Top 25.

=== Regular season ===
- Nov. 21, 2023
  - No. 2 Purdue defeated No. 7 Tennessee, 73–59 (Maui Invitational – Stan Sheriff Center, Honolulu, HI)
  - No. 4 Marquette defeated No. 1 Kansas, 73–59 (Maui Invitational – Stan Sheriff Center, Honolulu, HI)
- Nov. 22
  - No. 2 Purdue defeated No. 4 Marquette, 78–75 (Maui Invitational – Stan Sheriff Center, Honolulu, HI)
  - No. 1 Kansas defeated No. 7 Tennessee, 69–60 (Maui Invitational – Stan Sheriff Center, Honolulu, HI)
- Dec. 1
  - No. 5 Kansas defeated No. 4 UConn, 69–65 (Big East–Big 12 Battle – Allen Fieldhouse, Lawrence, KS)
- Dec. 5
  - No. 5 UConn defeated No. 9 North Carolina, 87–76 (Jimmy V Classic – Madison Square Garden, New York, NY)
- Dec. 15
  - No. 5 UConn defeated No. 10 Gonzaga, 76–63 (Continental Tire Seattle Tip-Off – Climate Pledge Arena, Seattle, WA)
- Dec. 16
  - No. 3 Purdue defeated No. 1 Arizona, 92–84 (Indy Classic – Gainbridge Fieldhouse, Indianapolis, IN)
- Jan. 5, 2024
  - No. 1 Purdue defeated No. 9 Illinois, 83–78 (Mackey Arena, West Lafayette, IN)
- Jan. 13
  - No. 3 Kansas defeated No. 9 Oklahoma, 78–66 (Allen Fieldhouse, Lawrence, KS)
- Feb. 3
  - No. 8 Kansas defeated No. 4 Houston, 78–65 (Allen Fieldhouse, Lawrence, KS)
  - No. 3 North Carolina defeated No. 7 Duke, 93–84 (Dean Smith Center, Chapel Hill, NC)
  - No. 5 Tennessee defeated No. 10 Kentucky, 103–92 (Rupp Arena, Lexington, KY)
- Feb. 4
  - No. 2 Purdue defeated No. 6 Wisconsin, 75–69 (Kohl Center, Madison, WI)
- Feb. 17
  - No. 1 UConn defeated No. 4 Marquette, 81–53 (XL Center, Hartford, CT)
- Feb. 19
  - No. 2 Houston defeated No. 6 Iowa State, 73–65 (Fertitta Center, Houston, TX)
- Mar. 6
  - No. 2 UConn defeated No. 8 Marquette, 74–67 (Fiserv Forum, Milwaukee, WI)
- Mar. 9
  - No. 7 North Carolina defeated No. 9 Duke, 84–79 (Cameron Indoor Stadium, Durham, NC)
- March 16
  - No. 7 Iowa State defeated No. 1 Houston, 69–41 (Big 12 tournament, T-Mobile Center, Kansas City, MO)
  - No. 2 UConn defeated No. 10 Marquette, 73–57 (Big East tournament, Madison Square Garden, New York, NY)

=== Postseason ===
- March 28
  - No. 10 Illinois defeated No. 4 Iowa State, 72–69 (Sweet Sixteen, TD Garden, Boston, MA)
- March 30
  - No. 1 UConn defeated No. 10 Illinois, 77–52 (Elite Eight, TD Garden, Boston, MA)
- March 31
  - No. 3 Purdue defeated No. 6 Tennessee, 72–66 (Elite Eight, Little Caesars Arena, Detroit, MI)
- April 8
  - No. 1 UConn defeated No. 3 Purdue, 75–60 (National Championship Game, State Farm Stadium, Phoenix, AZ)

== Regular season ==
=== Early season tournaments ===
Names	Dates	Location	Teams	Champion	Runner-up	3rd-place winner
Asheville Championship	November 10–12	Harrah's Cherokee Center (Asheville, NC)	4	Clemson	Davidson	UAB
Legends Classic	November 16–17	Barclays Center (Brooklyn, NY)	4	Auburn	St. Bonaventure	Notre Dame
Charleston Classic	November 16–19	TD Arena (Charleston, SC)	8	Houston	Dayton	St. John’s
Myrtle Beach Invitational	November 16–19	HTC Center (Conway, SC)	8	Liberty	Vermont	Wichita State
Bahamas Championship	November 17–19	Baha Mar Convention Center (Nassau, Bahamas)	4	Miami (FL)	Kansas State	Providence
Continental Tire Main Event	November 17–19	T-Mobile Arena (Las Vegas, NV)	4	San Diego State	Washington	Xavier
Paradise Jam Tournament	November 17–20	Sports and Fitness Center (Saint Thomas, VI)	8	Missouri State	Abilene Christian	Kent State
Hall of Fame Tip Off	November 18 & 19	Mohegan Sun Arena (Uncasville, CT)	4	Mississippi State	Northwestern	Washington State
Empire Classic	November 19 & 20	Barclays Center (Brooklyn, NY)	4	UConn	Texas	Indiana
Jacksonville Classic	November 19 & 20	Flagler Gymnasium (St. Augustine, FL)	8	UCF (Coast); Cornell (Bay)	Charlotte (Coast); Utah Valley (Bay)	George Mason (Coast); Cal State Fullerton (Bay)
Cayman Islands Classic	November 19–21	John Gray Gymnasium (George Town, Grand Cayman, CYM)	8	Utah State	Stephen F. Austin	Drake
Sunshine Slam	November 20 & 21	Ocean Center (Daytona Beach, FL)	8	Florida State (Beach); Stetson (Ocean)	Colorado (Beach); Central Michigan (Ocean)	Richmond (Beach); Milwaukee (Ocean)
Fort Myers Tip-Off	November 20–22	Suncoast Credit Union Arena (Fort Myers, FL)	8	Wisconsin	SMU	Virginia
Gulf Coast Showcase	November 20–22	Hertz Arena (Estero, FL)	8	Hofstra	High Point	Wright State
Maui Invitational	November 20–22	Stan Sheriff Center (Honolulu, HI)	8	Purdue	Marquette	Kansas
SoCal Challenge	November 20–22	The Pavilion at JSerra (San Juan Capistrano, CA)	8	Tarleton State (Sand); Bradley (Surf)	Cal State Bakersfield (Sand); UTEP (Surf)	Austin Peay (Sand); Tulane (Surf)
Cancún Challenge	November 21 & 22	Hard Rock Hotel – Riviera Maya (Cancún, MX)	8	James Madison (Riviera); Radford (Mayan)	Fresno State (Riviera); Northern Colorado (Mayan)	Southern Illinois (Riviera); Chicago State (Mayan)
Acrisure Classic	November 19–23	Acrisure Arena (Palm Springs, CA)	4	Arizona	Michigan State	UT Arlington
Hall of Fame Classic	November 22 & 23	T-Mobile Center (Kansas City, MO)	4	Colorado State	Creighton	Loyola Chicago
Arizona Tip-Off	November 17–24	Desert Diamond Arena (Phoenix, AZ)	8	Purdue Fort Wayne (Desert); South Carolina (Cactus)	South Dakota (Desert); Grand Canyon (Cactus)	Northern Arizona (Desert); San Francisco (Cactus)
Battle 4 Atlantis	November 22–24	Imperial Arena (Paradise Island, Nassau, Bahamas)	8	Villanova	Memphis	North Carolina
NIT Season Tip-Off	November 22 & 24	Barclays Center (Brooklyn, NY)	4	Baylor	Florida	Pittsburgh
Rady Children's Invitational	November 23 & 24	LionTree Arena (San Diego, CA)	4	Oklahoma	USC	Iowa
Vegas Showdown	November 23 & 24	Michelob Ultra Arena (Paradise, NV)	4	BYU	NC State	Arizona State
ESPN Events Invitational	November 23, 24, & 26	State Farm Field House (Lake Buena Vista, FL)	8	Florida Atlantic	Virginia Tech	Texas A&M
Emerald Coast Classic	November 24 & 25	The Arena at NFSC (Niceville, FL)	4	Ohio State; Western Michigan	Santa Clara; Mercer	Alabama; Tennessee State
Acrisure Invitational	November 24 & 25	Acrisure Arena (Palm Springs, CA)	4	Hawaii	San Diego	Arkansas State
Nassau Championship	November 24–26	Baha Mar Convention Center (Nassau, Bahamas)	8	UNC Greensboro	UIC	George Washington
Big 5 Classic	November 7 – December 2	Wells Fargo Center (final rounds) (Philadelphia, PA)	6	Saint Joseph's	Temple	La Salle
Sun Bowl Invitational	December 20 & 21	Don Haskins Center (El Paso, TX)	4	UTEP	Wyoming	Norfolk State
Diamond Head Classic	December 21–24	Stan Sheriff Center (Honolulu, HI)	8	Nevada	Georgia Tech	TCU

=== Head-to-head conference challenges ===
Conference Match Up	Dates	Conference Winner	Conference Loser	Record
MAC–SBC Challenge	November 8–12; February 10–11	Sun Belt	MAC	15–9
C-USA/WAC Challenge	November 9 – December 30	WAC	C-USA	11–7
Gavitt Tipoff Games (Big East–Big Ten)	November 13–17	**Tied**		4–4
ACC–SEC Challenge	November 28–29	**Tied**		7–7
Big East–Big 12 Battle	November 30 – December 6	Big 12	Big East	7–4
Pac−12/SWAC Legacy Series	November 10 – December 19	Pac-12	SWAC	6–0
Big Sky–Summit Challenge	January 3–6	Big Sky	Summit	11–7

=== Upsets ===
An upset is a victory by an underdog team. In the context of NCAA Division I men's basketball, this generally constitutes an unranked team defeating a team currently ranked in the top 25. This list will highlight those upsets of ranked teams by unranked teams as well as upsets of No. 1 teams. Rankings are from the AP poll. Bold type indicates winning teams in "true road games"—i.e., those played on an opponent's home court (including secondary homes). Italics type indicates winning teams in an early season tournament (or event). Early season tournaments are tournaments played in the early season. Events are the tournaments with the same teams in it every year (even rivalry games).

Winner	Score	Loser	Date	Tournament/event	Notes
**James Madison**	79–76^{OT}	No. 4 Michigan State	November 6, 2023		Michigan State was the first AP preseason top-5 team to lose its home opener to an unranked team since Kentucky lost to Western Kentucky in 2001. In an aside, JMU assistant Matt Bucklin is the nephew of MSU head coach Tom Izzo.
BYU	74–65	No. 17 San Diego State	November 10, 2023		
**Weber State**	61–57	No. 23 Saint Mary's	November 12, 2023		
Penn	76–72	No. 21 Villanova	November 13, 2023	Big 5 Classic	
**UC Irvine**	70–60	No. 16 USC	November 14, 2023		Irvine's win over USC made it their second consecutive year with an upset over a ranked Pac-12 team, having beat the Oregon Ducks in the previous season.
**UNC Greensboro**	78–72	No. 14 Arkansas	November 17, 2023		UNCG's win over Arkansas is the first over an SEC opponent in program history.
**Bryant**	61–52	No. 10 Florida Atlantic	November 18, 2023		Bryant's win over Florida Atlantic is the first over a ranked opponent in program history.
Wisconsin	65–41	No. 24 Virginia	November 20, 2023	Fort Myers Tip-Off	
Florida State	77–71^{OT}	No. 18 Colorado	November 21, 2023	Sunshine Slam	
No. 4 Marquette	73–59	No. 1 Kansas	November 21, 2023	Maui Invitational	
Villanova	83–81^{OT}	No. 14 North Carolina	November 23, 2023	Battle 4 Atlantis	
Colorado State	69–48	No. 8 Creighton	November 23, 2023	Hall of Fame Classic	
Memphis	84–79	No. 20 Arkansas	November 23, 2023	Battle 4 Atlantis	
Oklahoma	72–70	No. 23 USC	November 24, 2023	Rady Children's Invitational	
Ohio State	92–81	No. 17 Alabama	November 24, 2023	Emerald Coast Classic	
Georgia Tech	67–59	No. 21 Mississippi State	November 28, 2023	ACC–SEC Challenge	
**Clemson**	85–77	No. 23 Alabama	November 28, 2023	ACC–SEC Challenge	
**Saint Joseph's**	78–65	No. 18 Villanova	November 29, 2023	Big 5 Classic	
Virginia	59–47	No. 14 Texas A&M	November 29, 2023	ACC–SEC Challenge	
Arkansas	80–75	No. 7 Duke	November 29, 2023	ACC–SEC Challenge	
Northwestern	92–88	No. 1 Purdue	December 1, 2023		
Wisconsin	75–64	No. 3 Marquette	December 2, 2023	Rivalry	
Drexel	57–55	No. 18 Villanova	December 2, 2023	Big 5 Classic	
Georgia Tech	72–68	No. 7 Duke	December 2, 2023		
**UNC Wilmington**	80–73	No. 12 Kentucky	December 2, 2023		This was UNCW's first-ever win over a ranked team on the road. It was also Seahawks head coach Takayo Siddle's second win over a ranked Kentucky team at Rupp Arena; in 2007, he played in Gardner–Webb's early-season upset of the Wildcats.
**Southern**	60–59	No. 21 Mississippi State	December 3, 2023		
Grand Canyon	79–73	No. 25 San Diego State	December 5, 2023		This was Grand Canyon's first win over a ranked opponent in school history.
**Saint Mary's**	64–61	No. 13 Colorado State	December 9, 2023		
Utah	73–69	No. 14 BYU	December 9, 2023	Rivalry	
Washington	78–73	No. 7 Gonzaga	December 9, 2023	Rivalry	
Colorado	90–63	No. 15 Miami (FL)	December 10, 2023	NABC Brooklyn Showcase	
**Memphis**	81–75	No. 21 Texas A&M	December 10, 2023		
**Chicago State**	75–73	No. 25 Northwestern	December 13, 2023		This was Chicago State's first win over a ranked opponent in school history.
UNLV	79–64	No. 8 Creighton	December 13, 2023	Jack Jones Classic	
Michigan State	88–64	No. 6 Baylor	December 16, 2023	Motor City Invitational	
Memphis	79–77	No. 13 Clemson	December 16, 2023		
No. 3 Purdue	92–84	No. 1 Arizona	December 16, 2023	Indy Classic	
Providence	72–57	No. 6 Marquette	December 19, 2023		
Seton Hall	75–60	No. 5 UConn	December 20, 2023		
**Villanova**	68–66^{OT}	No. 12 Creighton	December 20, 2023		
**San Diego State**	84–74	No. 13 Gonzaga	December 29, 2023		
Florida Gulf Coast	72–68	No. 7 Florida Atlantic	December 30, 2023		
Stanford	100–82	No. 4 Arizona	December 31, 2023		
**Seton Hall**	61–57	No. 23 Providence	January 3, 2024		
Miami (FL)	95–82	No. 16 Clemson	January 3, 2024		
Seton Hall	78–75	No. 7 Marquette	January 6, 2024		Seton Hall's 2nd upset in three days and 3rd upset of the season.
Creighton	69–60	No. 23 Providence	January 6, 2024		
Southern Miss	81–71	No. 19 James Madison	January 6, 2024		
Charlotte	70–68	No. 17 Florida Atlantic	January 6, 2024		Charlotte's first win over a ranked team since 2013.
**Texas Tech**	78–67	No. 20 Texas	January 6, 2024		
Utah State	77–72	No. 13 Colorado State	January 6, 2024		
**Cincinnati**	71–60	No. 12 BYU	January 6, 2024		
Iowa State	57–53	No. 2 Houston	January 9, 2024		Iowa State's seventh win vs the AP top ten over the past two seasons, which is the most in D1.
Boise State	65–58	No. 17 Colorado State	January 9, 2024		
Nebraska	88–72	No. 1 Purdue	January 9, 2024		With Purdue's loss it is only the eighth time No. 1 & No. 2 lost on the same night in AP poll history. Also, it is Nebraska's first win over a No. 1 team since 1982.
Virginia Tech	87–72	No. 21 Clemson	January 10, 2024		
Mississippi State	77–72	No. 5 Tennessee	January 10, 2024		First win vs an AP top ten team since December 28, 2002.
UCF	65–60	No. 3 Kansas	January 10, 2024		
**Butler**	69–62	No. 11 Marquette	January 10, 2024		
TCU	80–71	No. 9 Oklahoma	January 10, 2024		
Santa Clara	77–76	No. 23 Gonzaga	January 11, 2024		This is Santa Clara's first win over Gonzaga in 13 years which total 26 games.
New Mexico	88–70	No. 19 San Diego State	January 13, 2024		
Texas A&M	97–92^{OT}	No. 6 Kentucky	January 13, 2024		5th unranked team to defeat a top six AP ranked team during the week.
Washington State	73–70	No. 8 Arizona	January 13, 2024		
West Virginia	76–73	No. 25 Texas	January 13, 2024		
TCU	68–67	No. 2 Houston	January 13, 2024		
**Maryland**	76–67	No. 10 Illinois	January 14, 2024		
Cincinnati	81–77^{OT}	No. 19 TCU	January 16, 2024		
Kansas State	68–64^{OT}	No. 9 Baylor	January 16, 2024		
Penn State	87–83	No. 11 Wisconsin	January 16, 2024		
New Mexico	99–86	No. 16 Utah State	January 16, 2024		Second consecutive win against a ranked AP opponent.
LSU	89–80	No. 22 Ole Miss	January 17, 2024		
**South Florida**	74–73	No. 10 Memphis	January 18, 2024		
Texas	75–73	No. 9 Baylor	January 20, 2024		
West Virginia	91–85	No. 3 Kansas	January 20, 2024		
**Pittsburgh**	80–76	No. 7 Duke	January 20, 2024		Pittsburgh's first win at Cameron Indoor Stadium since 1979.
Tulane	81–79	No. 10 Memphis	January 21, 2024		Tulane's first win over a top-10 opponent since 1983.
South Carolina	79–62	No. 6 Kentucky	January 23, 2024		
**Texas**	75–60	No. 11 Oklahoma	January 23, 2024		
Alabama	79–75	No. 8 Auburn	January 24, 2024	Rivalry	
Northwestern	96–91^{OT}	No. 10 Illinois	January 24, 2024	Rivalry	
Nevada	77–64	No. 24 Colorado State	January 24, 2024		
Oregon State	83–80	No. 9 Arizona	January 25, 2024		
Mississippi State	64–58	No. 8 Auburn	January 27, 2024		
Wyoming	79–76^{OT}	No. 24 Colorado State	January 27, 2024	Rivalry	
**TCU**	105–102^{3OT}	No. 15 Baylor	January 27, 2024		
Richmond	69–64	No. 16 Dayton	January 27, 2024		
UAB	97–88	No. 19 Memphis	January 28, 2024	Rivalry	
**South Carolina**	63–59	No. 5 Tennessee	January 30, 2024		
Georgia Tech	74–73	No. 3 North Carolina	January 30, 2024		
**Florida**	94–91^{OT}	No. 10 Kentucky	January 31, 2024	Rivalry	
**Boise State**	86–78	No. 19 New Mexico	January 31, 2024		
Nebraska	80–72^{OT}	No. 6 Wisconsin	February 1, 2024		
**Butler**	99–98	No. 13 Creighton	February 2, 2024		
**Texas**	77–66	No. 25 TCU	February 3, 2024		
San Diego State	81–67	No. 17 Utah State	February 3, 2024		
UCF	74–63	No. 23 Oklahoma	February 3, 2024		
**Cincinnati**	75–72	No. 15 Texas Tech	February 3, 2024		
Kansas State	75–70^{OT}	No. 4 Kansas	February 5, 2024	Sunflower Showdown	
**Clemson**	80–76	No. 3 North Carolina	February 6, 2024		Only Clemson's second win at the Dean Smith Center all time.
Oklahoma	82–66	No. 21 BYU	February 6, 2024		
**Nevada**	77–63	No. 22 Utah State	February 6, 2024		
Michigan	72–68	No. 11 Wisconsin	February 7, 2024		
Providence	91–87^{OT}	No. 19 Creighton	February 7, 2024		
UAB	76–73^{OT}	No. 20 Florida Atlantic	February 8, 2024		
VCU	49–47	No. 18 Dayton	February 9, 2024		
Nevada	70–66^{OT}	No. 24 San Diego State	February 9, 2024		
Rutgers	78–56	No. 11 Wisconsin	February 10, 2024		
Michigan State	88–80	No. 10 Illinois	February 10, 2024		
Florida	81–65	No. 12 Auburn	February 10, 2024		
**Gonzaga**	89–85	No. 17 Kentucky	February 10, 2024		This was Kentucky's third straight home loss—a first during the Wildcats' tenure at Rupp Arena (1976–present), and the first time for the program since 1966–67, when the Wildcats played at Memorial Coliseum.
**UNLV**	80–77	No. 25 New Mexico	February 10, 2024		
Texas A&M	85–69	No. 6 Tennessee	February 10, 2024		
Texas Tech	79–50	No. 6 Kansas	February 12, 2024		
**Pittsburgh**	74–63	No. 21 Virginia	February 13, 2024		
**Illinois State**	80–67	No. 23 Indiana State	February 13, 2024		
Syracuse	86–79	No. 7 North Carolina	February 13, 2024		First win against an AP Top 10 team since January 14, 2019
Oklahoma State	93–83	No. 19 BYU	February 17, 2024		
Iowa	88–86^{OT}	No. 20 Wisconsin	February 17, 2024		
**LSU**	64–63	No. 11 South Carolina	February 17, 2024		
Southern Illinois	74–69	No. 23 Indiana State	February 17, 2024		
South Florida	90–86	No. 24 Florida Atlantic	February 18, 2024		
Ohio State	73–69	No. 2 Purdue	February 18, 2024		
No. 15 Creighton	85–66	No. 1 UConn	February 20, 2024		Creighton's first win in program history against the AP No. 1 team. They were 0–6 entering the game.
Utah State	68–63	No. 19 San Diego State	February 20, 2024		
Penn State	90–89	No. 12 Illinois	February 21, 2024		First win at Rec Hall since 2015
George Mason	71–67	No. 16 Dayton	February 21, 2024		
LSU	75–74	No. 17 Kentucky	February 21, 2024		
New Mexico	68–66	No. 22 Colorado State	February 21, 2024		
Wake Forest	83–79	No. 8 Duke	February 24, 2024	Tobacco Road	
Kansas State	84–74	No. 25 BYU	February 24, 2024		
UCF	75–61	No. 23 Texas Tech	February 24, 2024		
Arizona State	73–61	No. 21 Washington State	February 24, 2024		
UNLV	66–60	No. 22 Colorado State	February 24, 2024		
St. John's	80–66	No. 15 Creighton	February 25, 2024		
**BYU**	76–68	No. 7 Kansas	February 27, 2024		This was BYU’s first game and win ever in Allen Fieldhouse. It also snapped the Jayhawks 67-game winning streak at home against unranked teams.
Loyola Chicago	77–72	No. 21 Dayton	March 1, 2024		First win over a ranked opponent at home since 1986
Florida	105–87	No. 16 Alabama	March 5, 2024		
UNLV	62–58	No. 21 San Diego State	March 5, 2024		
**Washington**	74–68	No. 18 Washington State	March 7, 2024	Rivalry	
**Boise State**	79–77	No. 21 San Diego State	March 8, 2024		
Kansas State	65–58	No. 6 Iowa State	March 9, 2024		
Tulsa	76–70	No. 24 South Florida	March 9, 2024		
Texas Tech	78–68	No. 11 Baylor	March 9, 2024		
USC	78–65	No. 5 Arizona	March 9, 2024		
Cincinnati	72–52	No. 16 Kansas	March 13, 2024	Big 12 Tournament	
NC State	74–69	No. 11 Duke	March 14, 2024	ACC Tournament	
Providence	78–73	No. 8 Creighton	March 14, 2024	Big East Tournament	
Duquesne	65–57	No. 24 Dayton	March 14, 2024	Atlantic 10 Tournament	
Colorado State	85–78	No. 23 Nevada	March 14, 2024	Mountain West Tournament	
Mississippi State	73–56	No. 5 Tennessee	March 15, 2024	SEC Tournament	
Texas A&M	97–87	No. 9 Kentucky	March 15, 2024	SEC Tournament	
Oregon	67–59	No. 6 Arizona	March 15, 2024	Pac-12 Tournament	
San Diego State	86–70	No. 18 Utah State	March 15, 2024	Mountain West Tournament	
Florida	102–88	No. 19 Alabama	March 15, 2024	SEC Tournament	
Colorado	58–52	No. 22 Washington State	March 15, 2024	Pac-12 Tournament	
Wisconsin	76–75	No. 3 Purdue	March 16, 2024	Big Ten Tournament	
No. 7 Iowa State	69–41	No. 1 Houston	March 16, 2024	Big 12 Tournament	
NC State	84–76	No. 4 North Carolina	March 16, 2024	ACC Tournament/Rivalry	

In addition to the above listed upsets in which an unranked team defeated a ranked team, there have been five non-Division I teams that defeated a Division I team so far this season. Bold type indicates winning teams in "true road games"—i.e., those played on an opponent's home court (including secondary homes).

Winner	Score	Loser	Date
**Clark Atlanta** (Division II)	71–64	Mercer	November 6, 2023
**Mobile** (NAIA)	83–74	South Alabama	November 6, 2023
**Albany State** (Division II)	92–85^{2OT}	Florida A&M	November 29, 2023
**Rocky Mountain** (NAIA)	70–62	Montana State	November 30, 2023
**Anderson (SC)** (Division II)	79–74	Furman	December 30, 2023

=== Conference winners and tournaments ===
Each of the 32 Division I athletic conferences ended its regular season with a single-elimination tournament. The team with the best regular-season record in each conference receives the number one seed in each tournament, with tiebreakers used as needed in the case of ties for the top seeding. Unless otherwise noted, the winners of these tournaments received automatic invitations to the 2024 NCAA Division I men's basketball tournament.

Conference	Regular season first place	Conference player of the year	Conference coach of the year	Conference tournament	Tournament venue (city)	Tournament winner
America East Conference	Vermont	Clarence Daniels, New Hampshire	John Becker, Vermont	2024 America East men's basketball tournament	Campus sites	Vermont
American Athletic Conference	South Florida	Johnell Davis, Florida Atlantic & Chris Youngblood, South Florida	Amir Abdur-Rahim, South Florida	2024 American Athletic Conference men's basketball tournament	Dickies Arena (Fort Worth, TX)	UAB
Atlantic Sun Conference	Eastern Kentucky	Isaiah Cozart, Eastern Kentucky	A. W. Hamilton, Eastern Kentucky	2024 Atlantic Sun men's basketball tournament	Campus sites	Stetson
Atlantic 10 Conference	Loyola Chicago & Richmond (Note: Top seed in conference tournament.)	DaRon Holmes II, Dayton & Jordan King, Richmond	Chris Mooney, Richmond	2024 Atlantic 10 men's basketball tournament	Barclays Center (Brooklyn, NY)	Duquesne
Atlantic Coast Conference	North Carolina	R. J. Davis, North Carolina	Hubert Davis, North Carolina	2024 ACC men's basketball tournament	Capital One Arena (Washington, DC)	NC State
Big 12 Conference	Houston	Jamal Shead, Houston	Kelvin Sampson, Houston	2024 Big 12 men's basketball tournament	T-Mobile Center (Kansas City, MO)	Iowa State
Big East Conference	UConn	Devin Carter, Providence	Dan Hurley, UConn	2024 Big East men's basketball tournament	Madison Square Garden (New York, NY)	UConn
Big Sky Conference	Eastern Washington	Dillon Jones, Weber State	David Riley, Eastern Washington & Steve Smiley, Northern Colorado	2024 Big Sky Conference men's basketball tournament	Idaho Central Arena (Boise, ID)	Montana State
Big South Conference	High Point	Drew Pember, UNC Asheville	Alan Huss, High Point	2024 Big South Conference men's basketball tournament	Qubein Center (High Point, NC)	Longwood
Big Ten Conference	Purdue	Zach Edey, Purdue	Fred Hoiberg, Nebraska & Matt Painter, Purdue	2024 Big Ten men's basketball tournament	Target Center (Minneapolis, MN)	Illinois
Big West Conference	UC Irvine	Elijah Pepper, UC Davis	Eric Olen, UC San Diego	2024 Big West Conference men's basketball tournament	Dollar Loan Center (Henderson, NV)	Long Beach State
Coastal Athletic Association	Charleston	Tyler Thomas, Hofstra	Pat Kelsey, Charleston	2024 CAA men's basketball tournament	Entertainment and Sports Arena (Washington, DC)	Charleston
Conference USA	Sam Houston	Isaiah Crawford, Louisiana Tech	Chris Mudge, Sam Houston	2024 Conference USA men's basketball tournament	Propst Arena (Huntsville, AL)	Western Kentucky
Horizon League	Oakland	Trey Townsend, Oakland	Sundance Wicks, Green Bay	2024 Horizon League men's basketball tournament	Quarterfinals: Campus sites Semifinals and final: Indiana Farmers Coliseum (Indianapolis, IN)	Oakland
Ivy League	Princeton	Caden Pierce, Princeton	Mitch Henderson, Princeton	2024 Ivy League men's basketball tournament	Levien Gymnasium (New York, NY)	Yale
Metro Atlantic Athletic Conference	Quinnipiac	Matt Balanc, Quinnipiac	Tom Pecora, Quinnipiac	2024 MAAC men's basketball tournament	Boardwalk Hall (Atlantic City, NJ)	Saint Peter's
Mid-American Conference	Toledo	Enrique Freeman, Akron	Tony Barbee, Central Michigan	2024 Mid-American Conference men's basketball tournament	Rocket Mortgage FieldHouse (Cleveland, OH)	Akron
Mid-Eastern Athletic Conference	Norfolk State	Jamarii Thomas, Norfolk State	Robert Jones, Norfolk State	2024 MEAC men's basketball tournament	Norfolk Scope (Norfolk, VA)	Howard
Missouri Valley Conference	Indiana State	Tucker DeVries, Drake	Josh Schertz, Indiana State	2024 Missouri Valley Conference men's basketball tournament	Enterprise Center (St. Louis, MO)	Drake
Mountain West Conference	Utah State	Great Osobor, Utah State	Danny Sprinkle, Utah State	2024 Mountain West Conference men's basketball tournament	Thomas and Mack Center (Paradise, NV)	New Mexico
Northeast Conference	Central Connecticut & Merrimack	Jordan Derkack, Merrimack	Patrick Sellers, Central Connecticut	2024 Northeast Conference men's basketball tournament	Campus sites	Wagner
Ohio Valley Conference	Little Rock & Morehead State & UT Martin	Riley Minix, Morehead State	Darrell Walker, Little Rock	2024 Ohio Valley Conference men's basketball tournament	Ford Center (Evansville, IN)	Morehead State
Pac-12 Conference	Arizona	Caleb Love, Arizona	Kyle Smith, Washington State	2024 Pac-12 Conference men's basketball tournament	T-Mobile Arena (Paradise, NV)	Oregon
Patriot League	Colgate	Braeden Smith, Colgate	Matt Langel, Colgate	2024 Patriot League men's basketball tournament	Campus sites	Colgate
Southeastern Conference	Tennessee	Dalton Knecht, Tennessee	Lamont Paris, South Carolina	2024 SEC men's basketball tournament	Bridgestone Arena (Nashville, TN)	Auburn
Southern Conference	Samford	Vonterius Woolbright, Western Carolina	Bucky McMillan, Samford	2024 Southern Conference men's basketball tournament	Harrah's Cherokee Center (Asheville, NC)	Samford
Southland Conference	McNeese	Shahada Wells, McNeese	Will Wade, McNeese	2024 Southland Conference men's basketball tournament	The Legacy Center (Lake Charles, LA)	McNeese
Southwestern Athletic Conference	Grambling State	Ken Evans Jr., Jackson State	Donte Jackson, Grambling State	2024 SWAC men's basketball tournament	Bartow Arena (Birmingham, AL)	Grambling State
Summit League	South Dakota State	Zeke Mayo, South Dakota State	Marvin Menzies, Kansas City	2024 Summit League men's basketball tournament	Denny Sanford Premier Center (Sioux Falls, SD)	South Dakota State
Sun Belt Conference	Appalachian State	Terrence Edwards Jr., James Madison	Dustin Kerns, Appalachian State	2024 Sun Belt Conference men's basketball tournament	Pensacola Bay Center (Pensacola, FL)	James Madison
West Coast Conference	Saint Mary's	Augustas Marčiulionis, Saint Mary's	Randy Bennett, Saint Mary's	2024 West Coast Conference men's basketball tournament	Orleans Arena (Paradise, NV)	Saint Mary's
Western Athletic Conference	Grand Canyon	Tyon Grant-Foster, Grand Canyon	Joseph Jones, Tarleton State	2024 WAC men's basketball tournament	Orleans Arena (Paradise, NV)	Grand Canyon

=== Statistical leaders ===
Source for additional stats categories

**Points per game**			**Rebounds per game**			**Assists per game**			**Steals per game**		
Player	School	PPG	Player	School	RPG	Player	School	APG	Player	School	SPG
Zach Edey	Purdue	25.2	Enrique Freeman	Akron	12.9	Tyler Kolek	Marquette	7.7	Arturo Dean	FIU	3.4
Tommy Bruner	Denver	24.0	Zach Edey	Purdue	12.2	Braden Smith	Purdue	7.5	Shahada Wells	McNeese	3.0
Terrence Shannon Jr.	Illinois	23.0	Vonterius Woolbright	W. Carolina	11.9	Elijah Hawkins	Minnesota	7.5	Robert Ford III	Montana St.	2.9
Tyler Thomas	Hofstra	22.5	Frank Mitchell	Canisius	11.6	Savion Lewis	Quinnipiac	7.3	Ace Baldwin Jr.	Penn St.	2.7
Xavier Johnson	S. Illinois	22.2	D. J. Burns	Youngstown St.	11.0	Symir Torrence	Binghamton	7.2	Tamin Lipsey	Iowa St.	2.7

**Blocked shots per game**			**Field goal percentage**			**Three-point field goal percentage**			**Free throw percentage**		
Player	School	BPG	Player	School	FG%	Player	School	3FG%	Player	School	FT%
Isaiah Cozart	E. Kentucky	3.9	AJ Braun	Wright St.	68.9	Koby Brea	Dayton	49.8	D. J. Davis	Butler	95.0
Ryan Kalkbrenner	Creighton	3.1	Keeshawn Kellman	FGCU	68.4	Cade Tyson	Belmont	46.5	Javian McCollum	Oklahoma	94.3
Clifford Omoruyi	Rutgers	2.9	Vladislav Goldin	FAU	67.3	Dominick Harris	Loyola Marymount	44.8	Dae Dae Grant	Duquesne	94.2
Jason Jitoboh	Tennessee St.	2.8	Lynn Kidd	Virginia Tech	66.8	Antonio Reeves	Kentucky	44.7	Joseph Girard III	Clemson	93.5
Justin Abson	Appalachian St.	2.8	Oumar Ballo	Arizona	65.8	Chaz Lanier	N. Florida	44.0	Zion Harmon	Bethune–Cookman	93.2

== Postseason tournaments ==
The NCAA Tournament tipped off on March 19, 2024 with the First Four in Dayton, Ohio, and will conclude on April 8 at State Farm Stadium in Glendale, Arizona. A total of 68 teams entered the tournament. Thirty-two of the teams earned automatic bids by winning their conference tournaments. The remaining 36 teams were granted "at-large" bids, which are extended by the NCAA Selection Committee.

=== Final Four – State Farm Stadium in Glendale, Arizona ===
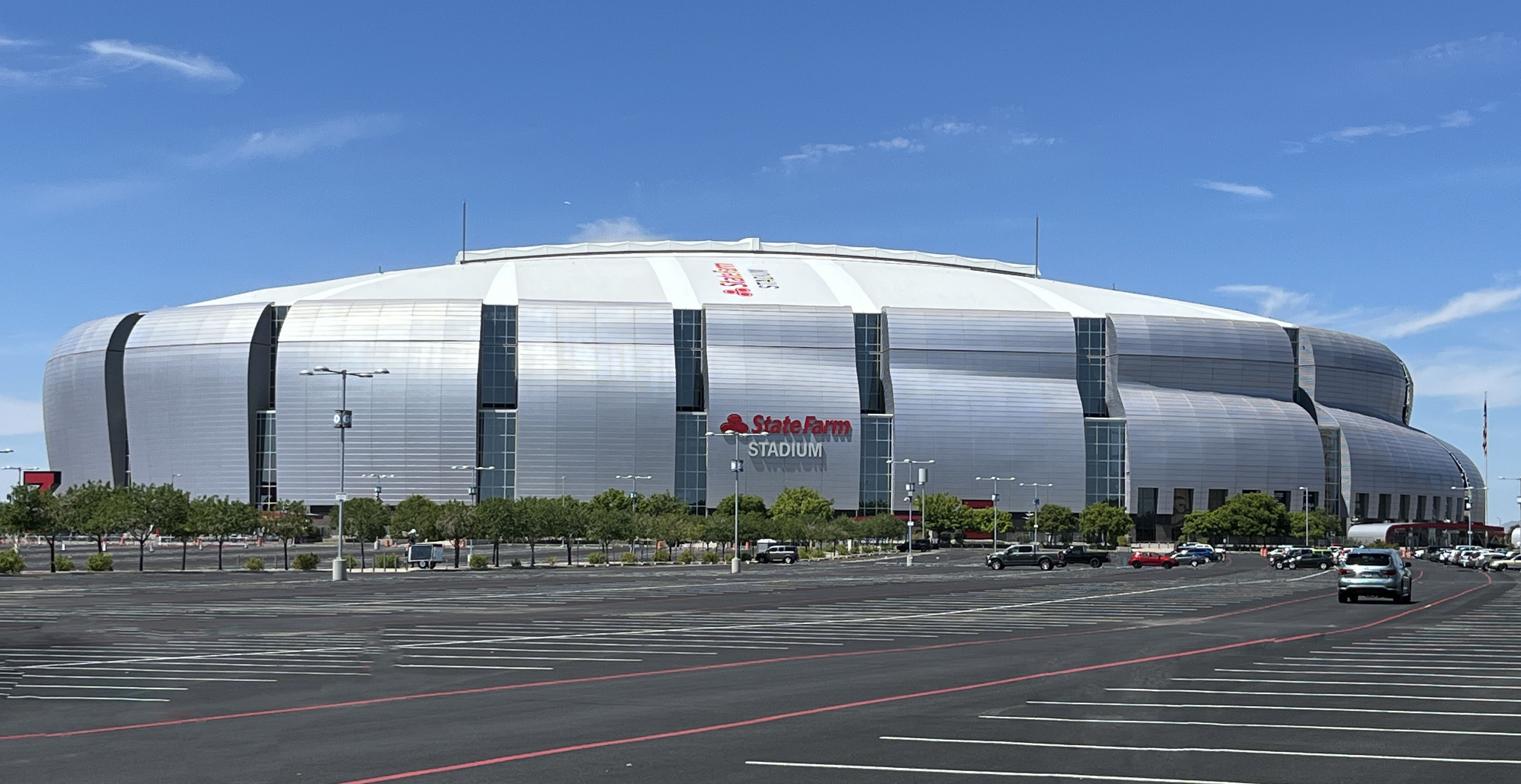
State Farm Stadium in Glendale, Arizona, hosted the NCAA men's Final Four.

National Semifinals; Final Four; Saturday, April 6
E1	UConn	86
W4	Alabama	72
S11	NC State	50
MW1	Purdue	63

National Championship Game; Monday, April 8
E1	UConn	75
MW1	Purdue	60

=== Tournament upsets ===
Per the NCAA, an upset occurs "when the losing team in an NCAA tournament game was seeded at least five seed lines better than the winning team." The 2024 tournament had nine upsets, with seven in the first round, one in the Sweet Sixteen, and one in the Elite Eight.

Upsets in the 2024 NCAA Division I men's basketball tournament
Round	West	Midwest	South	East
Round of 64	No. 12 Grand Canyon defeated No. 5 Saint Mary's, 75–66	No. 11 Oregon defeated No. 6 South Carolina, 87–73	No. 14 Oakland defeated No. 3 Kentucky, 80–76; No. 11 NC State defeated No. 6 Texas Tech, 80–67; No. 12 James Madison defeated No. 5 Wisconsin, 72–61	No. 11 Duquesne defeated No. 6 BYU, 71–67; No. 13 Yale defeated No. 4 Auburn, 78–76
Round of 32	None	None	None	None
Sweet 16	None	None	No. 11 NC State defeated No. 2 Marquette, 67–58	None
Elite 8	None	None	No. 11 NC State defeated No. 4 Duke, 76–64	None
Final 4	None			
National Championship	None			

=== National Invitation Tournament ===
After the NCAA Tournament field is announced, the National Invitation Tournament invites 32 teams to participate, reducing the field's size from 40. For the first time in recent years, automatic bids will not be granted to regular-season conference champions that fail to reach the NCAA tournament. Instead, after the NCAA tournament bracket is filled, the NCAA will award NIT bids to the top two remaining teams in NET rating from each of the so-called "Power 6" conferences (ACC, Big East, Big Ten, Big 12, Pac-12, and SEC). All games before the semifinals will be at campus sites, with the semifinals and final at Hinkle Fieldhouse in Indianapolis.

==== Semifinals and finals ====
Semifinals; April 2
1	Seton Hall	84
4	Georgia	67
1	Indiana State	100
2	Utah	90

Championship; April 4
1	Seton Hall	79
1	Indiana State	77

=== College Basketball Invitational ===
After the NCAA Tournament field was announced, the College Basketball Invitational invited 15 teams to participate.

==== Semifinals and finals ====
Semifinals; March 26
1	High Point	81
4	Arkansas State	80
7	Fairfield	58
3	Seattle	75

Championship; March 27
1	High Point	67
3	Seattle	77

=== CollegeInsider.com Postseason Tournament ===
After the NCAA Tournament field was announced, the CollegeInsider.com Postseason Tournament invited 9 teams to participate.

==== Semifinals and finals ====
Semifinals; March 23–25
Norfolk State	81
Alabama A&M	66
Tarleton State	72
Purdue Fort Wayne	73

Championship; March 27
Norfolk State	75
Purdue Fort Wayne	67

== Conference standings ==
2023–24 America East Conference men's basketball standings
	Conf.				Overall
Team	W		L	PCT	W		L	PCT
Vermont †	15	–	1	.938	28	–	7	.800
UMass Lowell	11	–	5	.688	22	–	10	.688
Bryant	11	–	5	.688	20	–	13	.606
New Hampshire	7	–	9	.438	16	–	15	.516
Binghamton	7	–	9	.438	15	–	15	.500
Maine	7	–	9	.438	15	–	17	.469
UMBC	6	–	10	.375	11	–	21	.344
Albany	5	–	11	.313	13	–	19	.406
NJIT	3	–	13	.188	7	–	21	.250
† 2024 AmEast tournament winner

2023–24 American Athletic Conference men's basketball standings
	Conf.				Overall
Team	W		L	PCT	W		L	PCT
South Florida	16	–	2	.889	25	–	8	.758
Florida Atlantic	14	–	4	.778	25	–	9	.735
Charlotte	13	–	5	.722	19	–	12	.613
UAB †	12	–	6	.667	23	–	12	.657
Memphis	11	–	7	.611	22	–	10	.688
SMU	11	–	7	.611	20	–	13	.606
North Texas	10	–	8	.556	19	–	15	.559
East Carolina	7	–	11	.389	15	–	18	.455
Tulsa	7	–	11	.389	16	–	15	.516
Tulane	5	–	13	.278	14	–	17	.452
Temple	5	–	13	.278	16	–	20	.444
Wichita State	5	–	13	.278	15	–	19	.441
Rice	5	–	13	.278	11	–	21	.344
UTSA	5	–	13	.278	11	–	21	.344
† 2024 AAC tournament winner

2023–24 Atlantic 10 men's basketball standings
	Conf.				Overall
Team	W		L	PCT	W		L	PCT
Richmond	15	–	3	.833	23	–	10	.697
Loyola Chicago	15	–	3	.833	23	–	10	.697
No. 24 Dayton	14	–	4	.778	25	–	8	.758
UMass	11	–	7	.611	20	–	11	.645
VCU	11	–	7	.611	24	–	14	.632
Duquesne †	10	–	8	.556	25	–	12	.676
St. Bonaventure	9	–	9	.500	20	–	13	.606
George Mason	9	–	9	.500	20	–	12	.625
Saint Joseph's	9	–	9	.500	21	–	14	.600
La Salle	6	–	12	.333	16	–	17	.485
Rhode Island	6	–	12	.333	12	–	20	.375
Fordham	6	–	12	.333	13	–	20	.394
Davidson	5	–	13	.278	15	–	17	.469
Saint Louis	5	–	13	.278	13	–	20	.394
George Washington	4	–	14	.222	15	–	17	.469
† 2024 A-10 tournament winner Rankings from AP poll

2023–24 ACC men's basketball standings
	Conf.				Overall
Team	W		L	PCT	W		L	PCT
No. 7 North Carolina	17	–	3	.850	29	–	8	.784
No. 9 Duke	15	–	5	.750	27	–	9	.750
Virginia	13	–	7	.650	23	–	11	.676
Pittsburgh	12	–	8	.600	22	–	11	.667
Wake Forest	11	–	9	.550	21	–	14	.600
No. 14 Clemson	11	–	9	.550	24	–	12	.667
Syracuse	11	–	9	.550	20	–	12	.625
Virginia Tech	10	–	10	.500	19	–	15	.559
Florida State	10	–	10	.500	17	–	16	.515
No. 10 NC State †	9	–	11	.450	26	–	15	.634
Boston College	8	–	12	.400	20	–	16	.556
Notre Dame	7	–	13	.350	13	–	20	.394
Georgia Tech	7	–	13	.350	14	–	18	.438
Miami (FL)	6	–	14	.300	15	–	17	.469
Louisville	3	–	17	.150	8	–	24	.250
† 2024 ACC tournament winner Rankings from AP Poll

2023–24 ASUN men's basketball standings
	Conf.				Overall
Team	W		L	PCT	W		L	PCT
Eastern Kentucky	12	–	4	.750	17	–	14	.548
Stetson †	11	–	5	.688	22	–	13	.629
Lipscomb	11	–	5	.688	20	–	12	.625
Austin Peay	10	–	6	.625	19	–	16	.543
North Florida	9	–	7	.563	16	–	16	.500
North Alabama	8	–	8	.500	15	–	17	.469
Florida Gulf Coast	8	–	8	.500	14	–	18	.438
Queens*	7	–	9	.438	14	–	19	.424
Kennesaw State	6	–	10	.375	15	–	16	.484
Jacksonville	5	–	11	.313	16	–	17	.485
Central Arkansas	5	–	11	.313	9	–	23	.281
Bellarmine*	4	–	12	.250	8	–	23	.258
† 2024 ASUN tournament winner * ineligible for the 2024 NCAA tournament due to transition from Division II

2023–24 Big 12 men's basketball standings
	Conf.				Overall
Team	W		L	PCT	W		L	PCT
No. 3т Houston	15	–	3	.833	32	–	5	.865
No. 8 Iowa State †	13	–	5	.722	29	–	8	.784
No. 16 Baylor	11	–	7	.611	24	–	11	.686
Texas Tech	11	–	7	.611	23	–	11	.676
BYU	10	–	8	.556	23	–	11	.676
No. 19 Kansas	10	–	8	.556	23	–	11	.676
Texas	9	–	9	.500	21	–	13	.618
TCU	9	–	9	.500	21	–	13	.618
Oklahoma	8	–	10	.444	20	–	12	.625
Kansas State	8	–	10	.444	19	–	15	.559
Cincinnati	7	–	11	.389	22	–	15	.595
UCF	7	–	11	.389	17	–	16	.515
Oklahoma State	4	–	14	.222	12	–	20	.375
West Virginia	4	–	14	.222	9	–	23	.281
† 2024 Big 12 tournament winner Rankings from AP poll

2023–24 Big East men's basketball standings
	Conf.				Overall
Team	W		L	PCT	W		L	PCT
No. 1 UConn †	18	–	2	.900	37	–	3	.925
No. 13 Creighton	14	–	6	.700	25	–	10	.714
No. 12 Marquette	14	–	6	.700	27	–	10	.730
Seton Hall	13	–	7	.650	25	–	12	.676
St. John's	11	–	9	.550	20	–	13	.606
Villanova	10	–	10	.500	18	–	16	.529
Providence	10	–	10	.500	21	–	14	.600
Butler	9	–	11	.450	18	–	15	.545
Xavier	9	–	11	.450	16	–	18	.471
Georgetown	2	–	18	.100	9	–	23	.281
DePaul	0	–	20	.000	3	–	29	.094
† 2024 Big East tournament winner Rankings from AP Poll

2023–24 Big Sky men's basketball standings
	Conf.				Overall
Team	W		L	PCT	W		L	PCT
Eastern Washington	15	–	3	.833	21	–	11	.656
Northern Colorado	12	–	6	.667	19	–	14	.576
Montana	12	–	6	.667	24	–	12	.667
Weber State	11	–	7	.611	20	–	12	.625
Montana State †	9	–	9	.500	17	–	18	.486
Portland State	8	–	10	.444	17	–	15	.531
Northern Arizona	7	–	11	.389	14	–	19	.424
Idaho State	7	–	11	.389	14	–	20	.412
Idaho	5	–	13	.278	11	–	21	.344
Sacramento State	4	–	14	.222	10	–	24	.294
† Conference tournament winner

2023–24 Big South men's basketball standings
	Conf.				Overall
Team	W		L	PCT	W		L	PCT
High Point	13	–	3	.813	27	–	9	.750
UNC Asheville	12	–	4	.750	22	–	12	.647
Gardner–Webb	11	–	5	.688	17	–	16	.515
Winthrop	8	–	8	.500	17	–	15	.531
Longwood †	6	–	10	.375	21	–	14	.600
Presbyterian	6	–	10	.375	14	–	19	.424
Charleston Southern	6	–	10	.375	10	–	20	.333
USC Upstate	5	–	11	.313	10	–	20	.333
Radford	5	–	11	.313	16	–	17	.485
† 2024 Big South tournament winner

2023–24 Big Ten Conference men's basketball standings
	Conf.				Overall
Team	W		L	PCT	W		L	PCT
No. 2 Purdue	17	–	3	.850	34	–	5	.872
No. 6 Illinois †	14	–	6	.700	29	–	9	.763
Nebraska	12	–	8	.600	23	–	11	.676
Northwestern	12	–	8	.600	22	–	12	.647
Wisconsin	11	–	9	.550	22	–	14	.611
Indiana	10	–	10	.500	19	–	14	.576
Iowa	10	–	10	.500	19	–	15	.559
Michigan State	10	–	10	.500	20	–	15	.571
Minnesota	9	–	11	.450	19	–	15	.559
Ohio State	9	–	11	.450	22	–	14	.611
Penn State	9	–	11	.450	16	–	17	.485
Maryland	7	–	13	.350	16	–	17	.485
Rutgers	7	–	13	.350	15	–	17	.469
Michigan	3	–	17	.150	8	–	24	.250
† 2024 Big Ten tournament winner Rankings from AP poll

2023–24 Big West men's basketball standings
	Conf.				Overall
Team	W		L	PCT	W		L	PCT
UC Irvine	17	–	3	.850	24	–	10	.706
UC San Diego*	15	–	5	.750	21	–	12	.636
UC Davis	14	–	6	.700	20	–	13	.606
Hawai'i	11	–	9	.550	20	–	14	.588
Long Beach State †	10	–	10	.500	21	–	15	.583
UC Riverside	10	–	10	.500	16	–	18	.471
UC Santa Barbara	9	–	11	.450	16	–	15	.516
Cal State Northridge	9	–	11	.450	19	–	15	.559
Cal State Bakersfield	8	–	12	.400	13	–	19	.406
Cal State Fullerton	7	–	13	.350	14	–	18	.438
Cal Poly	0	–	20	.000	4	–	28	.125
† 2024 Big West tournament winner * ineligible for the 2024 NCAA tournament due to transition period

2023–24 CAA men's basketball standings
	Conf.				Overall
Team	W		L	PCT	W		L	PCT
Charleston †	15	–	3	.833	27	–	8	.771
Drexel	13	–	5	.722	20	–	12	.625
Hofstra	12	–	6	.667	20	–	13	.606
UNC Wilmington	12	–	6	.667	21	–	10	.677
Towson	11	–	7	.611	20	–	14	.588
Delaware	10	–	8	.556	19	–	14	.576
Stony Brook	10	–	8	.556	20	–	15	.571
Monmouth	10	–	8	.556	18	–	15	.545
Campbell	8	–	10	.444	14	–	18	.438
Northeastern	7	–	11	.389	12	–	20	.375
Elon	6	–	12	.333	13	–	19	.406
North Carolina A&T	5	–	13	.278	7	–	25	.219
William & Mary	4	–	14	.222	10	–	23	.303
Hampton	3	–	15	.167	9	–	24	.273
† 2024 CAA tournament winner

2023–24 Conference USA men's basketball standings
	Conf.				Overall
Team	W		L	PCT	W		L	PCT
Sam Houston	13	–	3	.813	21	–	12	.636
Louisiana Tech	12	–	4	.750	22	–	10	.688
Western Kentucky †	8	–	8	.500	22	–	12	.647
Liberty	7	–	9	.438	18	–	14	.563
UTEP	7	–	9	.438	18	–	16	.529
New Mexico State	7	–	9	.438	13	–	19	.406
Middle Tennessee	7	–	9	.438	14	–	19	.424
Jacksonville State	6	–	10	.375	14	–	18	.438
FIU	5	–	11	.313	11	–	22	.333
† 2024 CUSA tournament winner

2023–24 Horizon League men's basketball standings
	Conf.				Overall
Team	W		L	PCT	W		L	PCT
Oakland †	15	–	5	.750	24	–	12	.667
Youngstown State	14	–	6	.700	22	–	10	.688
Green Bay	13	–	7	.650	18	–	14	.563
Wright State	13	–	7	.650	18	–	14	.563
Northern Kentucky	12	–	8	.600	18	–	15	.545
Milwaukee	12	–	8	.600	20	–	15	.571
Cleveland State	11	–	9	.550	21	–	15	.583
Purdue Fort Wayne	11	–	9	.550	23	–	13	.639
Robert Morris	6	–	14	.300	10	–	22	.313
IUPUI	2	–	18	.100	6	–	26	.188
Detroit Mercy	1	–	19	.050	1	–	31	.031
† 2024 Horizon League tournament winner

2023–24 Ivy League men's basketball standings
	Conf.				Overall
Team	W		L	PCT	W		L	PCT
Princeton	12	–	2	.857	24	–	5	.828
Yale †	11	–	3	.786	23	–	10	.697
Cornell	11	–	3	.786	22	–	8	.733
Brown	8	–	6	.571	13	–	18	.419
Harvard	5	–	9	.357	14	–	13	.519
Columbia	4	–	10	.286	13	–	14	.481
Penn	3	–	11	.214	11	–	18	.379
Dartmouth	2	–	12	.143	6	–	21	.222
† 2024 Ivy League tournament winner

2023–24 MAAC men's basketball standings
	Conf.				Overall
Team	W		L	PCT	W		L	PCT
Quinnipiac	15	–	5	.750	24	–	10	.706
Fairfield	14	–	6	.700	24	–	13	.649
Marist	12	–	8	.600	18	–	13	.581
Rider	12	–	8	.600	15	–	17	.469
Saint Peter's †	12	–	8	.600	19	–	14	.576
Niagara	11	–	9	.550	16	–	16	.500
Iona	10	–	10	.500	16	–	17	.485
Mount St. Mary's	9	–	11	.450	13	–	19	.406
Canisius	8	–	12	.400	14	–	18	.438
Manhattan	4	–	16	.200	7	–	23	.233
Siena	3	–	17	.150	4	–	28	.125
† 2024 MAAC tournament winner

2023–24 Mid-American Conference men's basketball standings
	Conf.				Overall
Team	W		L	PCT	W		L	PCT
Toledo	14	–	4	.778	20	–	12	.625
Akron †	13	–	5	.722	24	–	11	.686
Ohio	13	–	5	.722	20	–	13	.606
Central Michigan	12	–	6	.667	18	–	14	.563
Bowling Green	10	–	8	.556	20	–	14	.588
Western Michigan	9	–	9	.500	12	–	20	.375
Miami (OH)	9	–	9	.500	15	–	17	.469
Kent State	8	–	10	.444	17	–	17	.500
Ball State	7	–	11	.389	15	–	16	.484
Eastern Michigan	6	–	12	.333	13	–	18	.419
Northern Illinois	5	–	13	.278	11	–	20	.355
Buffalo	2	–	16	.111	4	–	27	.129
† 2024 MAC tournament winner

2023–24 MEAC men's basketball standings
	Conf.				Overall
Team	W		L	PCT	W		L	PCT
Norfolk State	11	–	3	.786	24	–	11	.686
North Carolina Central	9	–	5	.643	18	–	13	.581
South Carolina State	9	–	5	.643	14	–	18	.438
Howard †	9	–	5	.643	18	–	17	.514
Morgan State	7	–	7	.500	11	–	20	.355
Delaware State	6	–	8	.429	15	–	19	.441
Maryland Eastern Shore	4	–	10	.286	9	–	20	.310
Coppin State	1	–	13	.071	2	–	27	.069
† 2024 MEAC tournament winner

2023–24 Missouri Valley Conference men's basketball standings
	Conf.				Overall
Team	W		L	PCT	W		L	PCT
Indiana State	17	–	3	.850	32	–	7	.821
Drake †	16	–	4	.800	28	–	7	.800
Bradley	13	–	7	.650	23	–	12	.657
Northern Iowa	12	–	8	.600	19	–	14	.576
Belmont	12	–	8	.600	20	–	13	.606
Southern Illinois	11	–	9	.550	19	–	13	.594
Illinois State	9	–	11	.450	15	–	17	.469
Murray State	9	–	11	.450	12	–	20	.375
Missouri State	8	–	12	.400	17	–	16	.515
Evansville	6	–	14	.300	17	–	18	.486
UIC	4	–	16	.200	12	–	21	.364
Valparaiso	3	–	17	.150	7	–	25	.219
† 2024 MVC tournament winner

2023–24 Mountain West Conference men's basketball standings
	Conf.				Overall
Team	W		L	PCT	W		L	PCT
No. 22 Utah State	14	–	4	.778	28	–	7	.800
Nevada	13	–	5	.722	26	–	8	.765
Boise State	13	–	5	.722	22	–	11	.667
UNLV	12	–	6	.667	21	–	13	.618
No. 17 San Diego State	11	–	7	.611	26	–	11	.703
New Mexico †	10	–	8	.556	26	–	10	.722
Colorado State	10	–	8	.556	25	–	11	.694
Wyoming	8	–	10	.444	15	–	17	.469
Fresno State	4	–	14	.222	12	–	21	.364
San Jose State	2	–	16	.111	9	–	23	.281
Air Force	2	–	16	.111	9	–	22	.290
† 2024 Mountain West tournament winner Rankings from AP Poll

2023–24 NCAA Division I men's basketball independents standings
	Conf.				Overall
Team	W		L	PCT	W		L	PCT
Chicago State		–		–	13	–	19	.406

2023–24 Northeast Conference men's basketball standings
	Conf.				Overall
Team	W		L	PCT	W		L	PCT
Central Connecticut	13	–	3	.813	20	–	11	.645
Merrimack	13	–	3	.813	21	–	12	.636
Sacred Heart	10	–	6	.625	16	–	16	.500
Le Moyne*	9	–	7	.563	15	–	17	.469
Fairleigh Dickinson	9	–	7	.563	15	–	17	.469
Wagner †	7	–	9	.438	17	–	16	.515
LIU	6	–	10	.375	7	–	22	.241
Saint Francis	3	–	13	.188	8	–	22	.267
Stonehill*	2	–	14	.125	4	–	27	.129
† 2024 NEC tournament winner * ineligible for the 2024 NCAA tournament due to transition from Division II

2023–24 Ohio Valley Conference men's basketball standings
	Conf.				Overall
Team	W		L	PCT	W		L	PCT
Little Rock	14	–	4	.778	21	–	13	.618
UT Martin	14	–	4	.778	21	–	11	.656
Morehead State †	14	–	4	.778	26	–	9	.743
Western Illinois	13	–	5	.722	21	–	12	.636
Tennessee State	10	–	8	.556	18	–	15	.545
SIU Edwardsville	9	–	9	.500	17	–	16	.515
Eastern Illinois	8	–	10	.444	14	–	18	.438
Southern Indiana*	5	–	13	.278	8	–	24	.250
Tennessee Tech	5	–	13	.278	10	–	21	.323
Southeast Missouri State	4	–	14	.222	9	–	22	.290
Lindenwood*	3	–	15	.167	9	–	22	.290
† 2024 OVC tournament winner * ineligible for the 2024 NCAA tournament due to transition period

2023–24 Pac-12 Conference men's basketball standings
	Conf.				Overall
Team	W		L	PCT	W		L	PCT
No. 11 Arizona	15	–	5	.750	27	–	9	.750
No. 23 Washington State	14	–	6	.700	25	–	10	.714
Colorado	13	–	7	.650	26	–	11	.703
Oregon †	12	–	8	.600	24	–	12	.667
UCLA	10	–	10	.500	16	–	17	.485
Utah	9	–	11	.450	22	–	15	.595
California	9	–	11	.450	13	–	19	.406
Washington	9	–	11	.450	17	–	15	.531
USC	8	–	12	.400	15	–	18	.455
Stanford	8	–	12	.400	14	–	18	.438
Arizona State	8	–	12	.400	14	–	18	.438
Oregon State	5	–	15	.250	13	–	19	.406
† 2024 Pac-12 tournament winner Rankings from AP Poll

2023–24 Patriot League men's basketball standings
	Conf.				Overall
Team	W		L	PCT	W		L	PCT
Colgate †	16	–	2	.889	25	–	10	.714
Boston University	10	–	8	.556	16	–	17	.485
Lafayette	10	–	8	.556	11	–	21	.344
American	10	–	8	.556	16	–	16	.500
Bucknell	10	–	8	.556	14	–	19	.424
Lehigh	9	–	9	.500	14	–	18	.438
Navy	8	–	10	.444	13	–	18	.419
Army	6	–	12	.333	10	–	22	.313
Holy Cross	6	–	12	.333	10	–	23	.303
Loyola	5	–	13	.278	7	–	25	.219
† 2024 Patriot League tournament winner

2023–24 Southeastern Conference men's basketball standings
	Conf.				Overall
Team	W		L	PCT	W		L	PCT
No. 5 Tennessee	14	–	4	.778	27	–	9	.750
No. 20 Kentucky	13	–	5	.722	23	–	10	.697
No. 3т Alabama	13	–	5	.722	25	–	12	.676
No. 18 Auburn †	13	–	5	.722	27	–	8	.771
No. 25 South Carolina	13	–	5	.722	26	–	8	.765
Florida	11	–	7	.611	24	–	12	.667
Texas A&M	9	–	9	.500	21	–	15	.583
LSU	9	–	9	.500	17	–	16	.515
Mississippi State	8	–	10	.444	21	–	14	.600
Ole Miss	7	–	11	.389	20	–	12	.625
Georgia	6	–	12	.333	20	–	17	.541
Arkansas	6	–	12	.333	16	–	17	.485
Vanderbilt	4	–	14	.222	9	–	23	.281
Missouri	0	–	18	.000	8	–	24	.250
† 2024 SEC tournament winner Rankings from AP poll

2023–24 SWAC men's basketball standings
	Conf.				Overall
Team	W		L	PCT	W		L	PCT
Grambling State †	14	–	4	.778	21	–	15	.583
Alcorn State	13	–	5	.722	14	–	18	.438
Texas Southern	12	–	6	.667	16	–	17	.485
Southern	12	–	6	.667	18	–	14	.563
Bethune–Cookman	11	–	7	.611	17	–	17	.500
Jackson State	11	–	7	.611	15	–	17	.469
Alabama A&M	9	–	9	.500	12	–	23	.343
Alabama State	8	–	10	.444	13	–	19	.406
Arkansas–Pine Bluff	8	–	10	.444	13	–	18	.419
Prairie View A&M	5	–	13	.278	10	–	21	.323
Florida A&M	4	–	14	.222	6	–	23	.207
Mississippi Valley State	1	–	17	.056	1	–	30	.032
† 2024 SWAC tournament winner

2023–24 Southern Conference men's basketball standings
	Conf.				Overall
Team	W		L	PCT	W		L	PCT
Samford †	15	–	3	.833	29	–	6	.829
UNC Greensboro	12	–	6	.667	21	–	11	.656
Chattanooga	12	–	6	.667	21	–	12	.636
Western Carolina	11	–	7	.611	22	–	10	.688
Furman	10	–	8	.556	17	–	16	.515
Wofford	10	–	8	.556	17	–	15	.531
East Tennessee State	8	–	10	.444	19	–	16	.543
Mercer	8	–	10	.444	16	–	17	.485
The Citadel	3	–	15	.167	11	–	21	.344
VMI	1	–	17	.056	4	–	28	.125
† 2024 SoCon tournament winner

2023–24 Southland Conference men's basketball standings
	Conf.				Overall
Team	W		L	PCT	W		L	PCT
McNeese †	17	–	1	.944	30	–	4	.882
Texas A&M–Corpus Christi	14	–	4	.778	21	–	12	.636
Nicholls	13	–	5	.722	20	–	14	.588
Lamar	12	–	6	.667	19	–	14	.576
Southeastern Louisiana	10	–	8	.556	15	–	17	.469
Northwestern State	7	–	11	.389	9	–	23	.281
Texas A&M–Commerce*	6	–	12	.333	13	–	20	.394
New Orleans	4	–	14	.222	10	–	23	.303
Houston Christian	4	–	14	.222	6	–	23	.207
Incarnate Word	3	–	15	.167	8	–	23	.258
† 2024 Southland tournament winner * ineligible for the 2024 NCAA tournament due to transition period

2023–24 Summit League men's basketball standings
	Conf.				Overall
Team	W		L	PCT	W		L	PCT
South Dakota State †	12	–	4	.750	22	–	13	.629
Kansas City	10	–	6	.625	16	–	16	.500
North Dakota	10	–	6	.625	18	–	14	.563
St. Thomas *	9	–	7	.563	20	–	13	.606
North Dakota State	8	–	8	.500	15	–	17	.469
Omaha	7	–	9	.438	15	–	18	.455
Denver	6	–	10	.375	17	–	17	.500
Oral Roberts	5	–	11	.313	12	–	19	.387
South Dakota	5	–	11	.313	12	–	20	.375
† 2024 Summit League tournament winner * Ineligible for the 2024 NCAA tournament due to transition from Division III

2023–24 Sun Belt Conference men's basketball standings
	Conf.				Overall
Team	W		L	PCT	W		L	PCT
Appalachian State	16	–	2	.889	27	–	7	.794
James Madison †	15	–	3	.833	32	–	4	.889
Troy	13	–	5	.722	20	–	12	.625
Arkansas State	11	–	7	.611	20	–	17	.541
Louisiana	10	–	8	.556	19	–	14	.576
Southern Miss	9	–	9	.500	16	–	16	.500
Georgia State	8	–	10	.444	14	–	17	.452
South Alabama	8	–	10	.444	16	–	16	.500
Georgia Southern	8	–	10	.444	9	–	24	.273
Marshall	7	–	11	.389	13	–	20	.394
Texas State	7	–	11	.389	17	–	18	.486
Louisiana–Monroe	6	–	12	.333	11	–	19	.367
Coastal Carolina	5	–	13	.278	9	–	22	.290
Old Dominion	3	–	15	.167	7	–	25	.219
† 2024 Sun Belt tournament winner

2023–24 WAC men's basketball standings
	Conf.				Overall
Team	W		L	PCT	W		L	PCT
Grand Canyon †	17	–	3	.850	30	–	5	.857
Tarleton *	16	–	4	.800	25	–	10	.714
UT Arlington	13	–	7	.650	20	–	14	.588
Seattle	11	–	9	.550	23	–	14	.622
Utah Valley	11	–	9	.550	16	–	16	.500
Stephen F. Austin	10	–	10	.500	18	–	15	.545
Abilene Christian	10	–	10	.500	16	–	18	.471
California Baptist	8	–	12	.400	16	–	17	.485
Utah Tech *	7	–	13	.350	11	–	20	.355
Southern Utah	5	–	15	.250	10	–	21	.323
UT Rio Grande Valley	2	–	18	.100	6	–	25	.194
† 2024 WAC tournament winner * Ineligible for the NCAA tournament due to transition from Division II

2023–24 West Coast Conference men's basketball standings
	Conf.				Overall
Team	W		L	PCT	W		L	PCT
No. 21 Saint Mary's †	15	–	1	.938	26	–	8	.765
No. 15 Gonzaga	14	–	2	.875	27	–	8	.771
San Francisco	11	–	5	.688	23	–	11	.676
Santa Clara	10	–	6	.625	20	–	13	.606
San Diego	7	–	9	.438	18	–	15	.545
Portland	5	–	11	.313	12	–	21	.364
Loyola Marymount	5	–	11	.313	12	–	19	.387
Pepperdine	5	–	11	.313	13	–	20	.394
Pacific	0	–	16	.000	6	–	26	.188
† 2024 WCC tournament winner Rankings from AP Poll

== Award winners ==
=== 2024 consensus All-Americans ===
Consensus First Team
Player	Position	Class	Team
R. J. Davis	SG	Senior	North Carolina
Zach Edey	C	Senior	Purdue
Dalton Knecht	SF	Graduate	Tennessee
Tristen Newton	PG	Graduate	UConn
Jamal Shead	PG	Senior	Houston

Consensus Second Team
Player	Position	Class	Team
Hunter Dickinson	C	Senior	Kansas
Kyle Filipowski	PF/C	Sophomore	Duke
DaRon Holmes II	PF	Junior	Dayton
Tyler Kolek	PG	Senior	Marquette
Mark Sears	PG	Senior	Alabama

=== Major player of the year awards ===
- Wooden Award: Zach Edey, Purdue
- Naismith Award: Zach Edey, Purdue
- Associated Press Player of the Year: Zach Edey, Purdue
- NABC Player of the Year: Zach Edey, Purdue
- Oscar Robertson Trophy (USBWA): Zach Edey, Purdue
- Sporting News Player of the Year: Zach Edey, Purdue

=== Major freshman of the year awards ===
- Wayman Tisdale Award (USBWA): Reed Sheppard, Kentucky
- NABC Freshman of the Year: Reed Sheppard, Kentucky

=== Major coach of the year awards ===
- Associated Press Coach of the Year: Kelvin Sampson, Houston
- Henry Iba Award (USBWA): Kelvin Sampson, Houston
- NABC Coach of the Year: Kelvin Sampson, Houston
- Naismith College Coach of the Year: Dan Hurley, UConn
- Sporting News Coach of the Year: Dan Hurley, UConn

=== Other major awards ===
- Naismith Starting Five:
  - Bob Cousy Award (best point guard): Tristen Newton, UConn
  - Jerry West Award (best shooting guard): R. J. Davis, North Carolina
  - Julius Erving Award (best small forward): Dalton Knecht, Tennessee
  - Karl Malone Award (best power forward): Jaedon LeDee, San Diego State
  - Kareem Abdul-Jabbar Award (best center): Zach Edey, Purdue
- Pete Newell Big Man Award (best big man): Zach Edey, Purdue
- NABC Defensive Player of the Year: Jamal Shead, Houston
- Naismith Defensive Player of the Year: Jamal Shead, Houston
- Lute Olson Award: Zach Edey, Purdue
- Robert V. Geasey Trophy (top player in Philadelphia Big 5): Eric Dixon, Villanova
- Haggerty Award (top player in NYC metro area): Tyler Thomas, Hofstra
- Ben Jobe Award (top minority coach): Donte Jackson, Grambling State
- Hugh Durham Award (top mid-major coach): Josh Schertz, Indiana State
- Jim Phelan Award (top head coach): Fred Hoiberg, Nebraska
- Lefty Driesell Award (top defensive player): Boo Buie, Northwestern
- Lou Henson Award (top mid-major player): Trey Townsend, Oakland
- Skip Prosser Man of the Year Award (coach with moral character): Niko Medved, Colorado State
- Academic All-American of the Year (top scholar-athlete): Max Abmas, Texas
- Elite 90 Award (top GPA among upperclass players at Final Four): Max Scharnowski, Alabama
- Perry Wallace Most Courageous Award: Not presented to a Division I figure; the recipient, Jeremiah Armstead, played for NAIA member Fisk.

== Coaching changes ==
Many teams will change coaches during the season and after it ends.

Team	Former	Interim	New	Reason
Arkansas	Eric Musselman		John Calipari	Musselman left Arkansas after 5 seasons to take the USC job on April 4, 2024. On April 10, the Razorbacks announced that former Kentucky head coach and Hall-of-Famer John Calipari will take over as their next men's basketball coach.
Bryant	Jared Grasso	Phil Martelli Jr.		Grasso, who had been on a leave of absence from Bryant since September, with the school providing no more information as to why, announced his resignation on November 13, 2023 after 5 seasons. Bulldogs associate head coach Phil Martelli Jr., who was named acting head coach during Grasso's initial leave, was set to continue in that role for the rest of the season until 2 days later when he was officially named the new head coach of the program.
BYU	Mark Pope		Kevin Young	On April 12, 2024, Pope left BYU after 5 seasons with a 110–52 record to become the head coach at his alma mater, the University of Kentucky. Phoenix Suns associate head coach Young was hired by the Cougars on April 16.
Cal Poly	John Smith		Mike DeGeorge	Cal Poly announced on March 1, 2024 that Smith would not return at the end of the season, ending his 5-year tenure at the school. Under Smith, the Mustangs were 30–117 overall, having lost at least 20 games in all seasons under Smith. On March 26, the school hired DeGeorge from Division II Colorado Mesa as his replacement.
Canisius	Reggie Witherspoon		Jim Christian	Witherspoon and Canisius mutually agreed to part ways on March 16, 2024 after 8 seasons and a 108–130 record. Jim Christian, formerly the head coach at Kent State, TCU, Ohio, and most recently Boston College, was hired by the Golden Griffins on April 8.
Central Arkansas	Anthony Boone		John Shulman	Central Arkansas relieved Boone of his duties on March 2, 2024 after a 43–96 record in 4+ seasons. Former Chattanooga head coach Shulman, head coach at NCAA D2 Alabama-Huntsville for the past 5 years, was hired by the Bears on March 18.
Charleston	Pat Kelsey		Chris Mack	Kelsey left Charleston on March 28, 2024 after 3 seasons for the Louisville opening. The Cougars announced Chris Mack as their new head coach on April 2. Mack's most recent head coaching job had been at Louisville from 2018–2022, and previous Charleston head coach Kelsey had been an assistant under Mack at Xavier from 2009–2011.
Charleston Southern	Barclay Radebaugh	Saah Nimley		Radebaugh announced his resignation from Charleston Southern on November 30, 2023 after 18+ seasons. He left as the school's longest tenured head coach as well as the program's winnigest coach with 228 wins. Buccaneers associate head coach and former star player Nimley was named interim head coach for the rest of the season. On March 4, 2024, Nimley was officially named the new head coach of Charleston Southern.
Chicago State	Gerald Gillion		Scott Spinelli	Gillion resigned from Chicago State on April 13, 2024 after 3 seasons. He is expected to be the associate head coach at soon-to-be conference foe LIU. Cougars assistant coach Spinelli was promoted to the position on April 20.
Coastal Carolina	Cliff Ellis	Benny Moss	Justin Gray	Ellis announced his retirement from coaching on December 6, 2023 after 49 seasons, the last 17 spent at Coastal Carolina. The 78-year-old retired as the program's winningest head coach with 297 wins, and his 831 career NCAA D1 wins puts him in 9th all time. Longtime Chanticleers assistant coach Moss was named interim head coach for the remainder of the season. On March 11, 2024, the school hired Western Carolina head coach Gray for the position.
Cornell	Brian Earl		Jon Jaques	Earl left Cornell on March 23, 2024 after 7 seasons for the William & Mary job. The Big Red promoted associate head coach and Cornell alum Jaques to the position on April 5.
DePaul	Tony Stubblefield	Matt Brady	Chris Holtmann	Stubblefield was fired on January 22, 2024 after a 3–15 start to the season. Stubblefield finished his career at DePaul with a 28–54 record and no NCAA tournament appearances in 2½ seasons. Former Marist and James Madison head coach Matt Brady, who was serving as special assistant to the head coach, was announced as the Blue Demons' interim head coach for the remainder of the season. On March 14, the school hired former Ohio State head coach Holtmann for the job.
Detroit Mercy	Mike Davis		Mark Montgomery	Detroit Mercy and Davis mutually agreed to part ways on March 7, 2024, after 6 seasons, in which the Titans went 60–119 overall, including a 1–31 record this season. The Titans announced the hiring of Michigan State assistant and former Northern Illinois head coach Montgomery on April 3.
Drake	Darian DeVries		Ben McCollum	DeVries left Drake on March 24, 2024 after 6 seasons for West Virginia. Ben McCollum, who won 4 Division II championships in 15 seasons at Northwest Missouri State, was hired by the Bulldogs on April 1.
Duquesne	Keith Dambrot		Dru Joyce III	Less than 24 hours after leading Duquesne to their first NCAA tournament appearance since 1977 by virtue of winning the A10 tournament, Dambrot announced on March 18, 2024 that he will retire at the end of the season after 7 seasons with the Dukes and 26 seasons overall. It was announced on March 28 that associate head coach Dru Joyce III would be promoted to head coach.
Eastern Washington	David Riley		Dan Monson	Riley left EWU on April 2, 2024 after 3 seasons for the head coaching job at Washington State. Monson, most recently head coach at Long Beach State and also head coach at nearby Gonzaga during its breakout 1998–99 season, was hired by the Eagles on April 12.
Fairfield	Jay Young	Chris Casey		Young, who was set to begin his 5th season as Fairfield head coach, announced he was stepping down on October 16, 2023, just 3 weeks before the team's season opener at Boston College. Stags assistant coach Casey was initially named interim head coach for the season. On March 12, 2024, Fairfield removed the interim tag from Casey and officially named him head coach.
Florida A&M	Robert McCullum		Patrick Crarey II	FAMU announced on March 20, 2024 that Mccullum's contract, set to expire on June 30, will not be renewed after 7 seasons and a 67–133 record. NAIA St. Thomas (FL) head coach Crarey was hired by the Rattlers on April 17.
Florida Atlantic	Dusty May		John Jakus	ESPN reported on March 23, 2024 that May had agreed on a deal to become Michigan's new head coach after 6 seasons at FAU, and the university officially announced May's hiring hours later. The Owls hired Baylor assistant Jakus as his replacement on March 27.
Fresno State	Justin Hutson		Vance Walberg	Hutson announced he was stepping down from his head coaching position on March 14, 2024 after 6 seasons and a 92–94 record at Fresno State. Vance Walberg, a former head coach at Pepperdine who was in his 2nd stint as head coach at Clovis West HS in suburban Fresno, was hired by the Bulldogs on April 6.
Gardner–Webb	Tim Craft		Jeremy Luther	Craft left Gardner-Webb on March 13, 2024 after 11 seasons for the Western Carolina head coaching job. Runnin' Bulldogs associate head coach Luther was promoted to the position on March 27.
Green Bay	Sundance Wicks		Doug Gottlieb	Wicks left Green Bay on May 12, 2024 to take the head coaching job at Wyoming after one season where he went 18–14. Doug Gottlieb was hired by the Phoenix 2 days later.
Hampton	Edward Joyner		Ivan Thomas	Hampton parted ways with Joyner on March 11, 2024, after 15 seasons with a 223–257 record. Georgetown associate head coach Thomas was hired by the Pirates on March 15.
Houston Christian	Ron Cottrell		Craig Doty	Houston Christian decided on March 7, 2024 to not renew Cottrell's contract after 33 seasons. The Huskies hired Doty from D–II Emporia State on March 15.
Indiana State	Josh Schertz		Matthew Graves	Schertz left Indiana State on April 6, 2024 after 3 seasons for the Saint Louis job. Sycamores associate head coach Graves was promoted to fill the vacancy on April 11.
IUPUI	Matt Crenshaw		Paul Corsaro	IUPUI, which transitioned to IU Indy after the 2023–24 season, parted ways with Crenshaw on March 6, 2024 after a 14–79 record in 3 seasons. Paul Corsaro, head coach at the nearby D2 University of Indianapolis, was hired by the Jaguars on March 25.
James Madison	Mark Byington		Preston Spradlin	Byington was hired by Vanderbilt on March 25, 2024 after an 82–36 record in 4 seasons at JMU. The Dukes hired Morehead State head coach Spradlin on March 29.
Kentucky	John Calipari		Mark Pope	On April 9, 2024, Calipari announced he was stepping down at Kentucky. He finished with a record of 410–122 in 15 seasons with the program. BYU head coach Pope, a Kentucky alum and captain of the 1996 championship team, was hired by the Wildcats on April 12.
Long Beach State	Dan Monson		Chris Acker	In one of the most unusual coaching changes this season, Long Beach State and Monson agreed on a mutual separation, effective after the season, on March 11, 2024 after 17 seasons. Almost a week after the announcement, LBSU won the Big West Tournament to make the NCAA tournament, which they lost in the first round to Arizona. Officially, the Beach finished 275–273 under Monson, making him the winningest head coach of the program. On April 2, the school hired San Diego State assistant coach Acker as his replacement.
Louisville	Kenny Payne		Pat Kelsey	Following a disastrous 12–52 record in 2 seasons with his alma mater, Louisville fired Payne on March 13, 2024. The Cardinals announced the hiring of Charleston head coach Kelsey on March 28.
Loyola (MD)	Tavaras Hardy		Josh Loeffler	Hardy resigned from Loyola on March 8, 2024 after 6 seasons and a 66–110 record. Cincinnati assistant coach Loeffler, an assistant with the Greyhounds from 2013–2017, was hired as his replacement on March 30.
Marshall	Dan D'Antoni		Cornelius Jackson	Marshall parted ways with D'Antoni on March 25, 2024 after 10 seasons and named Thundering Herd associate head coach Jackson as his replacement.
Maryland Eastern Shore	Jason Crafton		Cleo Hill Jr.	UMES parted ways with Crafton on May 9, 2024 after 4 seasons and a 43–76 record. On June 1, the Shore Hawks hired Division II Winston-Salem State head coach Cleo Hill Jr. as his replacement.
Mercer	Greg Gary		Ryan Ridder	Mercer announced on March 11, 2024 that Gary's contract would not be renewed after 5 seasons, in which the Bears went 81–79. UT Martin head coach Ridder was hired by the Bears on March 15.
Michigan	Juwan Howard		Dusty May	Michigan announced on March 15, 2024 that Howard was relived of his coaching duties after 5 seasons. Howard finished with an 87–72 record, with one Elite Eight and one Sweet Sixteen appearance. The Wolverines would soon reach a deal with Florida Atlantic's May to replace Howard on March 23.
Missouri State	Dana Ford		Cuonzo Martin	Missouri State fired Ford on March 10, 2024 after 6 seasons and a 106–82 record. On March 27, the Bears announced that Cuonzo Martin would return to Missouri State as head coach, having served there from 2008–2011.
Morehead State	Preston Spradlin		Jonathan Mattox	Spradlin left Morehead State after 7½ seasons on March 29, 2024 for the James Madison opening. Murray State assistant Johnathan Mattox, who spent 9 seasons as an assistant with the Eagles, was named the school's 15th head coach on April 5,.
Mount St. Mary's	Dan Engelstad		Donny Lind	Engelstad resigned from the Mount on April 10, 2024 after 6 seasons to join Adrian Autry's staff as assistant coach at Syracuse. UNC Greensboro assistant coach Lind, previously an assistant coach and recruiting coordinator with the Mountaineers from 2013–16, was hired as his replacement on April 20.
New Orleans	Mark Slessinger		Stacy Hollowell	Slessinger left UNO on April 19, 2024 after 13 seasons to become the associate head coach at Indiana State. Texas Southern assistant coach Hollowell was hired by the Privateers on April 25.
Ohio State	Chris Holtmann	Jake Diebler		Holtmann was fired on February 14, 2024 in the middle of his 7th season as Ohio State head coach following a 14–11 start, a 4–10 start in conference play, and a streak of 15 consecutive losses in road games. His overall record with the Buckeyes was 137–85. Associate head coach Diebler was initially named interim head coach for the rest of the season. On March 17, the interim tag was removed from Diebler and he officially became the new head coach of the program.
Oklahoma State	Mike Boynton		Steve Lutz	Boynton was fired on March 14, 2024 after his 7th season as Oklahoma State head coach after a 12–20 season. His overall record with the Cowboys was 119–109 with 1 NCAA tournament appearance. Western Kentucky head coach Lutz was hired as his replacement on April 1.
Old Dominion	Jeff Jones	Kieran Donohue	Mike Jones	After the first 9 games of his 11th season as Old Dominion head coach, Jeff Jones stepped away from the team for health reasons after suffering a heart attack on December 20, 2023. On January 14, 2024, the Monarchs announced that assistant coach Donohue was named interim head coach for the rest of the season after Jones announced that he had to take treatment for prostate cancer for the fourth time since June 2015. On February 26, Jones officially announced his retirement. On March 1, Maryland assistant and former ODU player Mike Jones was hired as the new head coach.
Pacific	Leonard Perry	Josh Newman	Dave Smart	Perry was reassigned as men's head basketball coach to other duties for the university on March 4, 2024 after 3 seasons. Tigers associate head coach Newman served as the interim head coach through the remainder of the season. The school would then hire Texas Tech assistant Smart on March 27.
Pepperdine	Lorenzo Romar		Ed Schilling	Pepperdine announced on March 5, 2024 that Romar would not return after the season, ending his second stint with the school after 6 years. Grand Canyon assistant coach Schilling was hired by the Waves on April 2.
Rice	Scott Pera		Rob Lanier	Rice announced on March 14, 2024 that Pera would not return to the program after 7 seasons and a 96–127 record. On March 24, the Owls hired former SMU head coach Lanier.
Sacramento State	David Patrick	Michael Czepil	Mike Bibby	Patrick left Sac State on May 22, 2024 after 2 seasons to become associate head coach at LSU, having been an assistant there from 2012–2016. Hornets associate head coach Czepil was named interim head coach of the team for the 2024–25 season. After the season, Czepil was not retained and 14-year NBA vet Bibby was hired on March 25, 2025.
Saint Louis	Travis Ford		Josh Schertz	Saint Louis parted ways with Ford on March 13, 2024 after a 146–109 record with only one NCAA tournament appearance in 8 seasons. The Billikens hired Indiana State head coach Schertz as his replacement on April 6.
Siena	Carmen Maciariello		Gerry McNamara	Siena fired Maciariello on March 20, 2024, after a 68–72 record in 5 seasons, capped off by a 4–28 record this season. Longtime Syracuse assistant coach McNamara was hired by the Saints on March 29.
SMU	Rob Lanier		Andy Enfield	Despite doubling its win total from last year, SMU fired Lanier on March 21, 2024 after 2 seasons ahead of its move to the ACC. The Mustangs hired USC head coach Enfield as his replacement on April 1.
Southern Illinois	Bryan Mullins		Scott Nagy	Southern Illinois parted ways with Mullins on March 8, 2024 after 5 seasons, in which the Salukis went 86–68 with no postseason appearances. The school hired Wright State head coach Nagy as his replacement on March 28.
Stanford	Jerod Haase		Kyle Smith	Stanford fired Haase on March 14, 2024 after 8 seasons, in which the Cardinal went 126–127 with no NCAA tournament appearances. Washington State head coach Smith was hired as his replacement on March 25.
UIC	Luke Yaklich		Rob Ehsan	UIC fired Yaklich on March 10, 2024 after a 47–70 record in 4 seasons. Stanford assistant coach and former UAB head coach Ehsan was hired by the Flames on April 1.
USC	Andy Enfield		Eric Musselman	Enfield left USC on April 1, 2024 after 11 seasons for the SMU job. Arkansas head coach Eric Musselman was hired by the Trojans on April 4.
USC Upstate	Dave Dickerson		Marty Richter	Dickerson resigned from USC Upstate on March 25, 2024 after 6 seasons and a 65–117 record to become associate head coach of Ohio State. Drake assistant coach Richter was hired by the Spartans on April 5.
UT Martin	Ryan Ridder		Jeremy Shulman	Ridder left UT Martin on March 15, 2024 after 3 seasons for the Mercer job. Jeremy Shulman, head coach at NJCAA Eastern Florida State for the last 14 seasons, was hired by the Skyhawks on March 27.
UT Rio Grande Valley	Matt Figger		Kahil Fennell	UTRGV and Figger mutually agreed to part ways on March 19, 2024, after 3 seasons and a 29–65 record. BYU assistant Fennell was hired by the Vaqueros on April 5.
UTSA	Steve Henson		Austin Claunch	Henson's contract with UTSA was not renewed on March 14, 2024, ending his 8-year tenure with a 110–144 record. Alabama assistant and former Nicholls head coach Claunch was hired by the Roadrunners on March 17.
Utah State	Danny Sprinkle		Jerrod Calhoun	Following its NCAA tournament exit, on March 25, 2024, Washington announced it was hiring Danny Sprinkle for its head coaching vacancy. He ended his only season at Utah State with a 27–6 record and NCAA tournament appearance. Youngstown State head coach Calhoun was hired by the Aggies on March 30.
Vanderbilt	Jerry Stackhouse		Mark Byington	Vanderbilt and Stackhouse mutually agreed to part ways on March 14, 2024 after a 70–92 record in 5 seasons with no NCAA tournament appearances. On March 25, James Madison head coach Byington was hired by the Commodores.
Washington	Mike Hopkins		Danny Sprinkle	Washington announced on March 8, 2024 that after the season concluded, Hopkins would be relieved of his duties after 7 seasons. Under Hopkins, the Huskies were 118–106 with one appearance in the NCAA tournament. Utah State head coach Danny Sprinkle was announced as the replacement on March 25.
Washington State	Kyle Smith		David Riley	Smith left Washington State on March 25, 2024 after 5 seasons for the Stanford job. Eastern Washington head coach Riley was hired by the Cougars on April 2.
Western Carolina	Justin Gray		Tim Craft	Gray left Western Carolina on March 11, 2024 after 3 seasons for the Coastal Carolina head coaching position. Gardner-Webb head coach Craft was hired by the Catamounts 2 days later.
Western Kentucky	Steve Lutz		Hank Plona	Lutz left Western Kentucky on April 1, 2024 after a single season for the Oklahoma State head coaching position. Hilltoppers assistant coach Plona was promoted to fill the vacancy the following day.
West Virginia	Bob Huggins	Josh Eilert	Darian DeVries	Huggins resigned on June 17, 2023, one day after being arrested in Pittsburgh on a DUI charge. The arrest came six weeks after he had used an anti-gay slur in an interview with a Cincinnati radio station, for which he had been suspended for the first three games of the 2023–24 season. Huggins finished his 16-year tenure at his alma mater with 345 wins, the most in program history, along with 11 NCAA tournament appearances. A week after Huggins' departure, the Mountaineers named assistant coach Eilert as interim head coach for the 2023–24 season. On March 24, 2024, the school hired Drake head coach Darian DeVries for the job.
William & Mary	Dane Fischer		Brian Earl	Fischer was fired from William & Mary on March 10, 2024 after a 5-year record of 56–91. Cornell head coach Brian Earl was hired by the Tribe on March 23.
Wright State	Scott Nagy		Clint Sargent	Nagy departed Wright State on March 28, 2024 after 8 seasons for the Southern Illinois opening. Raiders associate head coach Sargent was promoted to the open position the same day.
Wyoming	Jeff Linder		Sundance Wicks	Linder departed from Wyoming on May 9, 2024 after 4 seasons, where he went 63–59, to take an assistant role at Texas Tech. Green Bay head coach Sundance Wicks, a former assistant under Linder, was hired by the Cowboys 3 days later.
Youngstown State	Jerrod Calhoun		Ethan Faulkner	Calhoun left Youngstown State on March 30, 2024 after 7 seasons for the Utah State job. Penguins associate head coach Faulkner was promoted to the position 2 days later.

== Attendances ==
The top 30 NCAA Division I men's basketball teams by average home attendance:

#	Team	Total attendance	Home games	Average attendance
1	North Carolina Tar Heels	308,895	15	20,593
2	Syracuse Orange	324,603	16	20,288
3	Kentucky Wildcats	358,702	18	19,928
4	Tennessee Volunteers	314,617	16	19,664
5	Arkansas Razorbacks	343,905	18	19,106
6	Creighton Bluejays	276,300	16	17,269
7	Indiana Hoosiers	296,427	18	16,468
8	Marquette Golden Eagles	260,918	16	16,307
9	Kansas Jayhawks	260,800	16	16,300
10	BYU Cougars	282,408	18	15,689
11	Wisconsin Badgers	264,516	17	15,560
12	Illinois Fighting Illini	269,827	18	14,990
13	Purdue Boilermakers	238,017	16	14,876
14	Michigan State Spartans	266,346	18	14,797
15	Nebraska Cornhuskers	277,338	19	14,597
16	Arizona Wildcats	230,268	16	14,392
17	Virginia Cavaliers	237,872	17	13,992
18	Iowa State Cyclones	249,620	18	13,868
19	NC State Wolfpack	229,346	17	13,491
20	Dayton Flyers	201,105	15	13,407
21	South Carolina Gamecocks	227,747	17	13,397
22	Maryland Terrapins	225,805	17	13,283
23	New Mexico Lobos	208,668	16	13,042
24	Texas Tech Red Raiders	219,743	17	12,926
25	Connecticut Huskies	203,722	16	12,733
26	San Diego State Aztecs	185,555	15	12,370
27	Memphis Tigers	184,135	15	12,276
28	Louisville Cardinals	207,067	18	11,504
29	Michigan Wolverines	172,437	15	11,496
30	Alabama Crimson Tide	181,739	15	11,359

== See also ==
- 2023–24 NCAA Division I women's basketball season
