= Damon Lynn =

American basketball player (born 1995)

Personal information
- Born: March 5, 1995 (age 31) Newark, New Jersey, U.S.
- Listed height: 5 ft 11 in (1.80 m)
- Listed weight: 165 lb (75 kg)

Career information
- High school: Union Catholic (Scotch Plains, New Jersey)
- College: NJIT (2013–2017)
- NBA draft: 2017: undrafted
- Playing career: 2018–2020
- Position: Point guard
- Number: 5

Career history
- 2018: BC Šiauliai
- 2018: Texas Legends
- 2018–2020: KW Titans

Career highlights
- First-team All-Atlantic Sun (2016); Second-team All-Atlantic Sun (2017); AP honorable mention All-American (2015)

Damon Nariq Lynn (born March 5, 1995) is an American former professional basketball player. He was more known for his collegiate career in which finished as one of the top three-point scoring players in NCAA Division I history.

== High school career ==
Lynn attended Union Catholic Regional High School, where he averaged over 24 points per game as a senior. His father, Al-Tariq Lynn, was on the 1991 Hillside High School state championship team. LIU Brooklyn was the first Division I team to offer Lynn a scholarship.

== College career ==
As a sophomore at NJIT, Lynn was named an honorable mention All-American by the Associated Press. He averaged 17.2 points and 3.9 assists per game as a sophomore. After being diagnosed with a stress fracture in his foot in January 2015, Lynn considered sitting out the remainder of the season but decided instead to compete in games but not practices. He scored 20 points in the team's upset win over the Michigan Wolverines. The team posted an 18–11 regular season record and were invited to the CollegeInsider.com Tournament. Lynn is the only player in NJIT history to amass over 1000 points as a sophomore. He also has the school record for most three-point shots made in NJIT history. He was named first-team All-ASUN Conference in 2016.

In his senior season, Lynn surpassed the 2,000 career points mark in a December 14, 2016 game against Iona. Just a month earlier, in a November 11 game against Sarah Lawrence College, Lynn became NJIT's all-time leading scorer in their NCAA Division I era.

== Professional career ==
On September 18, 2018, Lynn signed with the KW Titans in the NBL Canada.

During 2018, he signed with and played for the NBA G League Texas Legends, as well as BC Siauliai in Lietuvos krepšinio lyga,

== See also ==
- List of NCAA Division I men's basketball career 3-point scoring leaders
