= Cameron Tyson =

American basketball player (born 1999)

No. 5 – Brampton Honey Badgers
- Position: Point guard
- League: CEBL

Personal information
- Born: July 11, 1999 (age 27) Bothell, Washington, U.S.
- Listed height: 6 ft 3 in (1.91 m)
- Listed weight: 189 lb (86 kg)

Career information
- High school: Bothell (Bothell, Washington)
- College: Idaho (2018–2019); Houston (2020–2021); Seattle (2021–2024)
- NBA draft: 2024: undrafted
- Playing career: 2024–present

Career history
- 2024–2026: Rip City Remix
- 2026–present: Brampton Honey Badgers

Career highlights
- 3× First-team All-WAC (2022–2024); WAC All-Newcomer team (2022)

Cameron Lorenz Tyson (born October 26, 1999) is an American basketball player for the Brampton Honey Badgers of the Canadian Elite Basketball League (CEBL). He played college basketball for the Seattle Redhawks, as well as the Idaho Vandals and Houston Cougars. He is listed at 6 feet 3 inches tall and 190 pounds.

He attended Bothell High School, where he finished as all-time leading scorer.

== See also ==
- List of NCAA Division I men's basketball career 3-point scoring leaders
