= 2025–26 Temple Owls men's basketball team =

American college basketball season

2025–26 Temple Owls men's basketball
- Conference: American Conference
- Record: 16–16 (8–10 American)
- Head coach: Adam Fisher (3rd season)
- Associate head coach: Michael Huger
- Assistant coach: Bobby Jordan
- Home arena: Liacouras Center

2025–26 American Conference men's basketball standings
	Conf.				Overall
Team	W		L	PCT	W		L	PCT
South Florida †	15	–	3	.833	25	–	9	.735
Wichita State	13	–	5	.722	24	–	12	.667
Tulsa	13	–	5	.722	30	–	8	.789
UAB	11	–	7	.611	20	–	12	.625
Charlotte	9	–	9	.500	17	–	17	.500
North Texas	9	–	9	.500	19	–	14	.576
Florida Atlantic	9	–	9	.500	18	–	15	.545
Memphis	8	–	10	.444	13	–	19	.406
Tulane	8	–	10	.444	18	–	15	.545
Temple	8	–	10	.444	16	–	16	.500
Rice	7	–	11	.389	13	–	18	.419
East Carolina	6	–	12	.333	11	–	20	.355
UTSA	1	–	17	.056	5	–	25	.167
† 2026 American tournament winner

The 2025–26 Temple Owls men's basketball team represented Temple University during the 2025–26 NCAA Division I men's basketball season. The Owls were led by third-year head coach Adam Fisher and played their home games at the Liacouras Center located in Philadelphia, Pennsylvania as a member of the American Conference.

== Previous season ==
The Owls finished the 2025–26 season 17–15, 9–9 in AAC play to finish in seventh place. As a no. 7 seed in the AAC tournament they lost to Tulsa in the second round.

== Roster ==
2025–26 Temple Owls men's basketball team
Players
Coaches

Pos.	#	Name	Height	Weight	Year	Previous school	Hometown
G	0	Gavin Griffiths	6 ft 7 in (2.01 m)	200 lb (91 kg)	Jr	Kingswood Oxford School; Nebraska	Simsbury, CT
F	1	Jamai Felt	6 ft 9 in (2.06 m)	205 lb (93 kg)	RS So	Our Saviour Lutheran School; Bowling Green	Boston, MA
F	2	Ayuba Bryant Jr.	6 ft 9 in (2.06 m)	200 lb (91 kg)	Fr	JL Bourg Basket	Antwerp, Belgium
G	3	CJ Hines	6 ft 2 in (1.88 m)	185 lb (84 kg)	Sr	Archer High School; Alabama State	Atlanta, GA
C	4	Mohamed Keita	7 ft 1 in (2.16 m)	230 lb (104 kg)	Sr	The Winchendon School; Tulsa	Conakry, Guinea
G	7	Cam Wallace	6 ft 4 in (1.93 m)	185 lb (84 kg)	Fr	Westtown School	Malvern, PA
F	8	Spencer Mahoney	6 ft 8 in (2.03 m)	220 lb (100 kg)	RS So	Red Rocks Academy; California	Brooklyn, NY
G	9	AJ Smith	6 ft 5 in (1.96 m)	210 lb (95 kg)	Sr	Combine Academy; Charleston	Charlotte, NC
G	10	Masiah Gilyard	6 ft 3 in (1.91 m)	190 lb (86 kg)	Sr	Staten Island Technical High School; Manhattan	Brooklyn, NY
F	11	Babatunde Durodola	6 ft 8 in (2.03 m)	235 lb (107 kg)	So	DME Academy	Toronto, ON
G	13	Connor Gal	6 ft 4 in (1.93 m)	205 lb (93 kg)	Sr	Great Valley High School	Malvern, PA
G	21	Olin Chamberlain Jr.	6 ft 0 in (1.83 m)	180 lb (82 kg)	Fr	St. Joseph's Prep	Philadelphia, PA
G	22	Derrian Ford	6 ft 3 in (1.91 m)	200 lb (91 kg)	Sr	Magnolia High School; Arkansas State	Magnolia, AR
G	25	Aiden Tobiason	6 ft 5 in (1.96 m)	200 lb (91 kg)	So	St. Elizabeth High School	Wilmington, DE
G	32	Jordan Mason	6 ft 3 in (1.91 m)	200 lb (91 kg)	Sr	Tom C. Clark High School; UIC	San Antonio, TX

Head coach

- Adam Fisher (Penn State)

Assistant coach(es)

- Michael Huger (Bowling Green)
- Bobby Jordan (Drexel)
- Bill Courtney (Bucknell)

Legend

- (C) Team captain
- (S) Suspended
- (I) Ineligible
- (W) Walk-on
- Injured
- Current redshirt

Roster
Last update: November 13, 2025

== Schedule and results ==
Date time, TV	Rank^{#}	Opponent^{#}	Result	Record	High points	High rebounds	High assists	Site (attendance) city, state
Non-conference regular season
November 5, 2025*; 7:00 p.m., ESPN+		Delaware State	W 83–65	1–0	23 – Tobiason	8 – Durodola	6 – Mason	Liacouras Center (3,637); Philadelphia, PA
November 11, 2025*; 7:00 p.m., ESPN+		La Salle; Big 5 Classic Pod 1	W 90–63	2–0	22 – Ford	6 – Tied	5 – Tied	Liacouras Center (3,108); Philadelphia, PA
November 15, 2025*; 2:00 p.m., ESPN+		Boston College	L 71–76	2–1	18 – Ford	9 – Ford	4 – Tobiason	Liacouras Center (3,063); Philadelphia, PA
November 19, 2025*; 7:00 p.m., ESPN+		Hofstra	W 81–76	3–1	21 – Tobiason	6 – Durodola	3 – Tobiason	Liacouras Center (2,442); Philadelphia, PA
November 24, 2025*; 4:30 p.m., ESPNU		vs. UC San Diego; ESPN Events Invitational Adventure Bracket quarterfinals	L 76–91	3–2	16 – Gilyard	8 – Gilyard	2 – Tied	State Farm Field House; Kissimmee, FL
November 25, 2025*; 7:30 p.m., ESPNU		vs. Princeton; ESPN Events Invitational Adventure Bracket consolation semifinals	W 79–75	4–2	21 – Ford	9 – Griffiths	6 – Mason	State Farm Field House; Kissimmee, FL
November 26, 2025*; 7:30 p.m., ESPNU		vs. Rhode Island; ESPN Events Invitational Adventure Bracket 5th place game	L 75–90	4–3	18 – Smith	9 – Felt	6 – Mason	State Farm Field House (539); Kissimmee, FL
December 1, 2025*; 6:30 p.m., FS1		at Villanova; Big 5 Classic Pod 1	L 56–74	4–4	15 – Tobiason	6 – Griffiths	3 – Mason	Finneran Pavilion (6,501); Villanova, PA
December 6, 2025*; 4:30 p.m., NBCSPHI		vs. Saint Joseph's; Big 5 Classic 3rd Place Game	L 69–70	4–5	27 – Ford	8 – Tobiason	6 – Mason	Xfinity Mobile Arena; Philadelphia, PA
December 9, 2025*; 7:00 p.m., ESPN+		Georgian Court	W 103–57	5–5	18 – Ford	8 – Mason	11 – Mason	Liacouras Center (2,042); Philadelphia, PA
December 14, 2025*; 12:00 p.m., ESPN+		Saint Francis	W 95–67	6–5	24 – Ford	6 – Ford	4 – Wallace	Liacouras Center (2,043); Philadelphia, PA
December 18, 2025*; 7:00 p.m., ESPN+		at Davidson	W 68–63	7–5	23 – Ford	9 – Ford	2 – Tied	John M. Belk Arena (2,151); Davidson, NC
December 22, 2025*; 7:00 p.m., ESPN+		Princeton	W 65–61	8–5	16 – Mason	6 – Felt	4 – Tied	Liacouras Center (2,924); Philadelphia, PA
American regular season
December 30, 2025; 7:00 p.m., ESPN+		at Charlotte	W 76–73	9–5 (1–0)	18 – Mason	7 – Griffiths	5 – Tobiason	Dale F. Halton Arena (2,342); Charlotte, NC
January 3, 2026; 12:00 p.m., ESPNU		UTSA	W 76–57	10–5 (2–0)	23 – Griffiths	8 – Gilyard	12 – Mason	Liacouras Center (4,011); Philadelphia, PA
January 7, 2026; 7:00 p.m., ESPN+		East Carolina	W 75–67	11–5 (3–0)	24 – Griffiths	6 – Griffiths	5 – Mason	Liacouras Center (2,128); Philadelphia, PA
January 14, 2026; 8:00 p.m., ESPN+		at Memphis	L 53–55	11–6 (3–1)	15 – Griffiths	7 – Tobiason	4 – Tobiason	FedExForum (9,610); Memphis, TN
January 18, 2026; 12:00 p.m., ESPNU		Florida Atlantic	L 73–79	11–7 (3–2)	23 – Tobiason	7 – Tied	2 – Tied	Liacouras Center (2,588); Philadelphia, PA
January 21, 2026; 8:00 p.m., ESPN+		at Rice	W 69–65	12–7 (4–2)	15 – Tied	8 – Griffiths	6 – Mason	Tudor Fieldhouse (1,183); Houston, TX
January 24, 2026; 1:00 p.m., ESPN+		at UTSA	W 70–64	13–7 (5–2)	21 – Ford	8 – Ford	4 – Tobiason	Convocation Center (1,027); San Antonio, TX
January 28, 2026; 7:00 p.m., ESPN+		Charlotte	L 76–80 ^{OT}	13–8 (5–3)	21 – Ford	6 – Tied	4 – Tied	Liacouras Center (2,659); Philadelphia, PA
January 31, 2026; 8:00 p.m., ESPN2		South Florida	W 79–78	14–8 (6–3)	22 – Tobiason	6 – Gilyard	5 – Tied	Liacouras Center (4,050); Philadelphia, PA
February 7, 2025; 12:00 p.m., ESPNU		at East Carolina	W 81–73	15–8 (7–3)	27 – Tobiason	9 – Griffiths	7 – Mason	Williams Arena (4,010); Greenville, NC
February 11, 2026; 7:30 p.m., ESPN+		at Tulane	L 66–77	15–9 (7–4)	26 – Ford	8 – Tobiason	5 – Mason	Devlin Fieldhouse (1,196); New Orleans, LA
February 15, 2026; 2:00 p.m., ESPN+		North Texas	L 62–65	15–10 (7–5)	20 – Ford	9 – Griffiths	4 – Ford	Liacouras Center (3,685); Philadelphia, PA
February 18, 2026; 7:00 p.m., ESPNU		UAB	L 71–76	15–11 (7–6)	18 – Mason	10 – Felt	3 – Tied	Liacouras Center (2,761); Philadelphia, PA
February 21, 2026; 6:00 p.m., ESPN2		at Wichita State	L 57–69	15–12 (7–7)	18 – Tobiason	5 – Tied	2 – Mason	Charles Koch Arena (8,094); Wichita, KS
February 26, 2026; 7:00 p.m., ESPN2		at Florida Atlantic	L 73–77	15–13 (7–8)	20 – Tied	7 – Griffiths	4 – Mason	Eleanor R. Baldwin Arena (3,161); Boca Raton, FL
March 1, 2026; 2:00 p.m., ESPN+		Rice	L 74–80	15–14 (7–9)	20 – Tied	6 – Gilyard	4 – Mason	Liacouras Center (2,684); Philadelphia, PA
March 5, 2026; 7:00 p.m., ESPN2		Tulane	W 89–60	16–14 (8–9)	21 – Tobiason	7 – Tobiason	5 – Tied	Liacouras Center (2,141); Philadelphia, PA
March 8, 2026; 3:00 p.m., ESPN+		at Tulsa	L 76–78	16–15 (8–10)	23 – Ford	9 – Durodola	3 – Tied	Reynolds Center (5,152); Tulsa, OK
American tournament
March 11, 2026; 9:00 p.m., ESPN+	(10)	vs. (7) Florida Atlantic; First round	L 59–63	16–16	16 – Ford	7 – Felt	1 – Tied	Legacy Arena; Birmingham, AL
*Non-conference game. ^{#}Rankings from AP Poll. (#) Tournament seedings in parentheses. All times are in Eastern Time.
