= 2025–26 Tulane Green Wave men's basketball team =

American college basketball season

2025–26 Tulane Green Wave men's basketball
- Conference: American Conference
- Record: 18–15 (8–10 American)
- Head coach: Ron Hunter (7th season)
- Associate head coach: Ray McCallum
- Assistant coaches: Claude Pardue; Sean Mock; Gebereal Baitey; R. J. Hunter
- Home arena: Devlin Fieldhouse

2025–26 American Conference men's basketball standings
	Conf.				Overall
Team	W		L	PCT	W		L	PCT
South Florida †	15	–	3	.833	25	–	8	.758
Wichita State	13	–	5	.722	22	–	11	.667
Tulsa	13	–	5	.722	26	–	7	.788
UAB	11	–	7	.611	20	–	12	.625
Charlotte	9	–	9	.500	17	–	17	.500
North Texas	9	–	9	.500	19	–	14	.576
Florida Atlantic	9	–	9	.500	18	–	15	.545
Memphis	8	–	10	.444	13	–	19	.406
Tulane	8	–	10	.444	18	–	15	.545
Temple	8	–	10	.444	16	–	16	.500
Rice	7	–	11	.389	13	–	18	.419
East Carolina	6	–	12	.333	11	–	20	.355
UTSA	1	–	17	.056	5	–	25	.167
† 2026 American tournament winner As of March 15, 2026

The 2025–26 Tulane Green Wave men's basketball team represented Tulane University during the 2025–26 NCAA Division I men's basketball season. The Green Wave, led by seventh-year head coach Ron Hunter, played their home games at Devlin Fieldhouse in New Orleans, Louisiana as members of the American Conference.

== Previous season ==
The Green Wave finished the 2024–25 season 19–15, 12–6 in AAC play, to finish in fourth place. They defeated Florida Atlantic in the quarterfinals of the AAC tournament, before being eliminated by top-seeded Memphis in the semifinals. They then lost to USC in the first round of the College Basketball Crown.

== Roster ==
2025–26 Tulane Green Wave men's basketball team
Players
Coaches

Pos.	#	Name	Height	Weight	Year	Previous school	Hometown
F	0	Tyler Ringgold	6 ft 8 in (2.03 m)	225 lb (102 kg)	So	Southern Lab; Texas A&M	Baton Rouge, LA
G	1	Josiah Moore	6 ft 4 in (1.93 m)	205 lb (93 kg)	So	Rouse HS; Oral Roberts	Leander, TX
F	2	Gregg Glenn III	6 ft 7 in (2.01 m)	240 lb (109 kg)	Sr	Calvary CA; Michigan	Pompano Beach, FL
F	5	Scotty Middleton	6 ft 6 in (1.98 m)	165 lb (75 kg)	Jr	Sunrise Christian HS; Seton Hall	Miami, FL
G	7	Rowan Brumbaugh	6 ft 4 in (1.93 m)	185 lb (84 kg)	Jr	Northfield Mount Hermon; Georgetown	Washington, D.C.
G	9	KJ Greene	6 ft 3 in (1.91 m)	170 lb (77 kg)	So	Pace Academy	Atlanta, GA
G	11	Luke Rasmussen	6 ft 8 in (2.03 m)	215 lb (98 kg)	So	The Hill School; Lafayette	Haverford, PA
G	13	Joseph Teich	5 ft 10 in (1.78 m)	155 lb (70 kg)	So	Pine Crest School	Ft. Lauderdale, FL
G	15	Robert Moore	6 ft 6 in (1.98 m)	180 lb (82 kg)	Fr	Porter–Gaud School	Charleston, SC
G	22	Asher Woods	6 ft 3 in (1.91 m)	190 lb (86 kg)	Sr	Parkview HS; VMI	Atlanta, GA
C	23	Percy Daniels	6 ft 10 in (2.08 m)	230 lb (104 kg)	Sr	Madison Prep	Baton Rouge, LA
F	32	Luke Cronin	6 ft 8 in (2.03 m)	210 lb (95 kg)	Jr	Great Neck North HS; Yeshiva University	Great Neck, NY
G	34	Jake Shapiro	6 ft 1 in (1.85 m)	190 lb (86 kg)	Jr	Windward School	Los Angeles, CA
C	55	Davion Bradford	7 ft 0 in (2.13 m)	265 lb (120 kg)	Sr	Mehlville HS	St. Louis, MO
F	77	Vasilije Kuridza	6 ft 9 in (2.06 m)	235 lb (107 kg)	Fr	Banja Luka, Bosnia
G	99	Curtis Williams Jr.	6 ft 6 in (1.98 m)	180 lb (82 kg)	Jr	Brother Rice HS	Detroit, MI

Head coach

- Ron Hunter (Miami (OH))

Assistant coach(es)

- Ray McCallum (Ball State)
- Claude Pardue (Emory)
- Sean Mock (Miami (OH))
- Gebereal Baitey (Emory)
- R. J. Hunter (Georgia State)

Legend

- (C) Team captain
- (S) Suspended
- (I) Ineligible
- (W) Walk-on
- Injured
- Current redshirt

Roster
Last update: November 14, 2025

== Schedule and results ==
Date time, TV	Rank^{#}	Opponent^{#}	Result	Record	High points	High rebounds	High assists	Site (attendance) city, state
Exhibition
October 28, 2025*; 6:30 p.m.		Centenary	W 95–66	–	19 – Woods	8 – Woods	5 – Tied	Devlin Fieldhouse (729); New Orleans, LA
Non-conference regular season
November 3, 2025*; 7:30 p.m., ESPN+		Samford	W 85–72	1–0	24 – Woods	6 – Tied	3 – Woods	Devlin Fieldhouse (1,467); New Orleans, LA
November 8, 2025*; 1:00 p.m., ESPN+		Texas State	W 79–71	2–0	33 – Brumbaugh	7 – Ringgold	6 – Brumbaugh	Devlin Fieldhouse (1,059); New Orleans, LA
November 11, 2025*; 7:00 p.m., ESPN+		at Louisiana	W 66–62	3–0	19 – Brumbaugh	9 – Middleton	3 – Middleton	Cajundome (3,047); Lafayette, LA
November 14, 2025*; 6:30 p.m., ESPN+		New Orleans	L 63–85	3–1	18 – Brumbaugh	6 – Brumbaugh	3 – Brumbaugh	Devlin Fieldhouse (2,009); New Orleans, LA
November 21, 2025*; 12:00 p.m., ESPN2		vs. Utah State; Charleston Classic Lowcountry Bracket semifinal	L 75–96	3–2	19 – Brumbaugh	5 – Woods	3 – Tied	TD Arena; Charleston, SC
November 23, 2025*; 5:30 p.m., ESPN2		vs. Boston College; Charleston Classic Lowcountry Bracket consolation game	W 93–90 ^{OT}	4–2	32 – Williams Jr.	9 – Williams Jr.	5 – Brumbaugh	TD Arena; Charleston, SC
November 28, 2025*; 2:00 p.m., ESPN+		Nicholls	W 82–72	5–2	19 – Woods	7 – Ringgold	7 – Greene	Devlin Fieldhouse (1,168); New Orleans, LA
December 2, 2025*; 6:30 p.m., ESPN+		Grambling State	W 65–63	6–2	17 – Tied	13 – Williams Jr.	3 – Williams Jr.	Devlin Fieldhouse (1,255); New Orleans, LA
December 6, 2025*; 3:00 p.m., ESPN+		Akron	L 71–88	6–3	16 – Brumbaugh	8 – Ringgold	5 – Williams Jr.	Devlin Fieldhouse (902); New Orleans, LA
December 10, 2025*; 6:30 p.m., ESPN+		Tougaloo	W 84–72	7–3	22 – Brumbaugh	12 – Middleton	6 – Tied	Devlin Fieldhouse (834); New Orleans, LA
December 13, 2025*; 11:00 p.m., BallerTV		vs. UC San Diego; Jack Jones Classic	L 67–93	7–4	19 – Brumbaugh	11 – Ringgold	5 – Brumbaugh	Lee's Family Forum; Las Vegas, NV
December 17, 2025*; 6:30 p.m., ESPN+		Louisiana Tech	W 61–53	8–4	16 – Brumbaugh	5 – Tied	3 – Tied	Devlin Fieldhouse (1,030); New Orleans, LA
December 20, 2025*; 6:30 p.m., ESPN+		Portland State	W 63–61	9–4	21 – Woods	7 – Middleton	3 – Woods	Devlin Fieldhouse (1,243); New Orleans, LA
American regular season
December 31, 2025; 11:00 a.m., ESPNU		at East Carolina	W 79–70	10–4 (1−0)	19 – Tied	7 – Brumbaugh	4 – Tied	Minges Coliseum (2,992); Greenville, NC
January 4, 2026; 12:00 p.m., ESPN2		Florida Atlantic	W 69–66	11–4 (2–0)	20 – Brumbaugh	7 – Middleton	4 – Ringgold	Devlin Fieldhouse (1,071); New Orleans, LA
January 10, 2025; 4:00 p.m., ESPN+		at UTSA	W 85–52	12–4 (3–0)	23 – Brumbaugh	7 – Tied	5 – Brumbaugh	Convocation Center (907); San Antonio, TX
January 14, 2026; 6:30 p.m., ESPN+		UAB	L 69–82	12–5 (3–1)	16 – Tied	5 – Tied	6 – Brumbaugh	Devlin Fieldhouse (1,541); New Orleans, LA
January 18, 2026; 3:00 p.m., ESPN2		North Texas	L 63–71	12–6 (3–2)	22 – Brumbaugh	7 – Brumbaugh	3 – Williams Jr.	Devlin Fieldhouse (1,307); New Orleans, LA
January 21, 2026; 6:00 p.m., ESPN+		at Florida Atlantic	L 74–79	12–7 (3–3)	27 – Williams Jr.	8 – Middleton	3 – Brumbaugh	Eleanor R. Baldwin Arena (3,161); Boca Raton, FL
January 25, 2026; 6:30 p.m., ESPN+		at Charlotte	L 70–73	12–8 (3–4)	35 – Brumbaugh	5 – Brumbaugh	4 – Greene	Dale F. Halton Arena (2,454); Charlotte, NC
January 28, 2026; 8:00 p.m., ESPNU		South Florida	L 83–97	12–9 (3–5)	14 – Tied	6 – Brumbaugh	5 – Tied	Devlin Fieldhouse (1,279); New Orleans, LA
February 1, 2026; 2:00 p.m., ESPN2		at Memphis	W 78–76	13–9 (4–5)	27 – Brumbaugh	7 – Williams Jr.	5 – Woods	FedExForum (9,320); Memphis, TN
February 8, 2026; 1:00 p.m., ESPN+		Wichita State	L 61–75	13–10 (4–6)	17 – Brumbaugh	6 – Brumbaugh	3 – Tied	Devlin Fieldhouse (1,050); New Orleans, LA
February 11, 2026; 6:30 p.m., ESPN+		Temple	W 77–66	14–10 (5–6)	22 – Ringgold	8 – Williams Jr.	9 – Brumbaugh	Devlin Fieldhouse (1,196); New Orleans, LA
February 15, 2026; 1:00 p.m., ESPNU		at UAB	W 55–54	15–10 (6–6)	17 – Brumbaugh	9 – Middleton	4 – Brumbaugh	Bartow Arena (3,864); Birmingham, AL
February 19, 2026; 8:00 p.m., ESPN2		at North Texas	W 77–71	16–10 (7–6)	17 – Brumbaugh	6 – Middleton	4 – Ringgold	The Super Pit (3,514); Denton, TX
February 22, 2026; 1:00 p.m., ESPN+		Rice	W 81–75	17–10 (8–6)	24 – Woods	8 – Williams Jr.	6 – Brumbaugh	Devlin Fieldhouse (1,957); New Orleans, LA
February 25, 2026; 6:30 p.m., ESPN+		Tulsa	L 56–90	17–11 (8–7)	16 – Williams Jr.	5 – Williams Jr.	5 – Brumbaugh	Devlin Fieldhouse (1,482); New Orleans, LA
March 1, 2026; 11:00 a.m., ESPN2		at South Florida	L 62–90	17–12 (8–8)	27 – Williams Jr.	7 – Brumbaugh	3 – Tied	Yuengling Center (6,579); Tampa, FL
March 5, 2026; 6:00 p.m., ESPN2		at Temple	L 60–89	17–13 (8–9)	14 – Brumbaugh	4 – Tied	7 – Brumbaugh	Liacouras Center (2,141); Philadelphia, PA
March 8, 2026; 1:00 p.m., ESPN+		Memphis	L 95–96 ^{OT}	17–14 (8–10)	31 – Brumbaugh	10 – Williams Jr.	3 – Tied	Devlin Fieldhouse (1,731); New Orleans, LA
American tournament
March 11, 2026; 6:00 p.m., ESPNews	(9)	vs. (8) Memphis; First round	W 81–69	18–14	35 – Brumbaugh	8 – Brumbaugh	3 – Tied	Legacy Arena; Birmingham, AL
March 12, 2026; 6:00 p.m., ESPNU	(9)	vs. (5) Charlotte; Second round	L 60–74	18–15	25 – Brumbaugh	8 – Williams Jr.	3 – Daniels	Legacy Arena; Birmingham, AL
*Non-conference game. ^{#}Rankings from AP poll. (#) Tournament seedings in parentheses. All times are in Central.
