= Ron Kane =

Career information
- High school: The Lawrenceville School
- College: Franklin & Marshall College
- Coaching career: 1991–2020

Career history

Coaching
- 1991-2020: The Lawrenceville School (Boys)

Career highlights
- Prep A state championship; Mid-Atlantic Prep League regular season title; Mid-Atlantic Prep League tournament title

Ron Kane is an American educator and basketball coach who led the boys’ basketball program at The Lawrenceville School from 1991 to 2020.

== Early life and education ==
Kane attended Lawrenceville School, graduating in 1983. As a student-athlete, he earned 12 varsity letters across football, basketball, and baseball before continuing as a three-sport athlete at Franklin & Marshall College.

== Coaching career ==
=== The Lawrenceville School (1991–2020) ===
After serving as an assistant coach under Armond Hill, Kane began leading the boys’ basketball program at Lawrenceville School in 1991. He remained head coach for 29 seasons and also served on the school’s faculty as an English teacher. Kane stepped down from the position in May 2020.

During Kane’s tenure, Lawrenceville won the Prep A state championship and both the regular season and tournament titles of the Mid-Atlantic Prep League. In 2013, Kane coached the team to the Mid-Atlantic Prep League tournament final following a semifinal victory over Blair Academy.

Following Kane’s departure, Doug Davis was appointed as the next head coach, as announced later in 2020.

=== Players coached ===
Kane coached Claude Pardue, current assistant coach for the Tulane men's basketball team. Kane also coached Mathew Johnson.

== Personal ==
In profiles published by Town Topics in 2015 and 2018, his daughter cited his coaching background as an influence on her continued participation in competitive basketball prior to enrolling at Franklin & Marshall.

In 2020, his son Aidan Kane completed his senior season playing under him.

In addition to basketball, Kane has worked as a youth sports instructor and camp director. He has served as a director for Nike Junior Golf Camps.
