= Bryan Hodgson =

American basketball coach (born 1987)

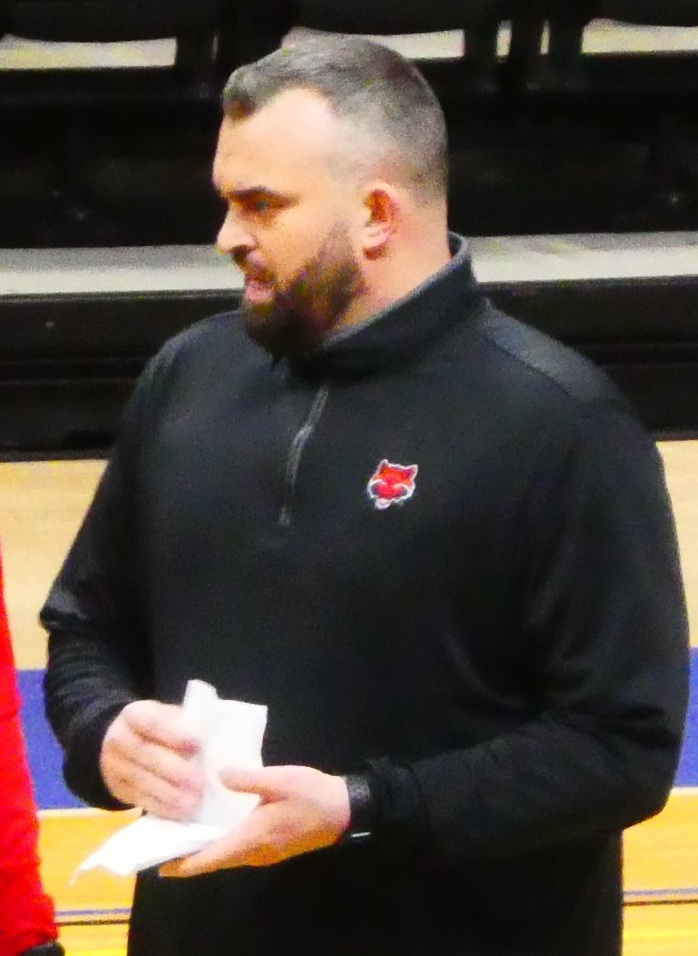
- Hodgson in 2024

Current position
- Title: Head coach
- Team: Providence
- Conference: Big East
- Record: 3–1 (.750)

Biographical details
- Born: April 11, 1987 (age 39); Olean, New York, U.S.
- Education: Jamestown CC (A.A., 2007); Fredonia (B.S., 2011); Southwest (M.Ed. 2015)

Playing career
- 2005–2007: Jamestown CC

Coaching career (HC unless noted)
- 2007–2010: Fredonia State (asst.)
- 2010–2013: Jamestown CC (asst.)
- 2013–2015: Midland (asst.)
- 2015–2019: Buffalo (asst.)
- 2019–2023: Alabama (asst.)
- 2023–2025: Arkansas State
- 2025–2026: South Florida
- 2026–present: Providence

Head coaching record
- Overall: 73–38 (.658)
- Tournaments: 0–1 (NCAA Division I); 1–1 (NIT); 2–1 (CBI)

Accomplishments and honors

Championships
- Sun Belt regular season (2025); American Conference regular season (2026); American Conference tournament (2026)

Awards
- American Conference Coach of the Year (2026)

Bryan Hodgson (born April 11, 1987) is an American college basketball coach who is currently serving as the head coach of the Providence Friars men's basketball team after making the 2026 NCAA Tournament as head coach with University of South Florida.

== Early life ==
Hodgson was born in Olean, New York in 1987 to a teenage mother. (Note: His mother was fourteen or fifteen years old at the time of his birth according to different sources.) After his mother's boyfriend placed him on top of a wood stove when he was only a year old, Hodgson was placed in foster care. He was adopted by Larry and Rebecca Hodgson. Raised as a part of a large family in the Western New York communities of Bolivar and then later Jamestown, he graduated from Jamestown High School where he was a member of the Red Raider varsity basketball team.

== College career ==
Hodgson played collegiately at Jamestown Community College, a NJCAA Region III program, where he served as team captain for two seasons before earning an associate degree in social science. Continuing his education at Fredonia State, Hodgson earned a Bachelor of Science in sports management.

== Coaching career ==
=== Assistant coach (2007–2023) ===
Getting his coaching career started as a student assistant at the Fredonia State, Hodgson spent his summers working the basketball camp circuit where he has worked the prestigious camps at Duke, Maryland, West Virginia, Syracuse, and Michigan State.

Before joining the staff at the University at Buffalo, Hodgson spent time coaching in the NJCAA at his alma mater Jamestown CC as well as Midland College and the I-90 AAU travel team. During this time he helped many of his athletes move on to NCAA Division-I programs.

Hodgson joined head coach Nate Oats's staff at Alabama in 2019 as the lead recruiter. He oversaw a 2022 recruiting class which was ranked third in the nation by 247Sports. He was personally responsible for the recruitment of Brandon Miller and Jaden Bradley.

=== Arkansas State (2023–2025) ===
On March 22, 2023, Hodgson was announced as the head coach of the Arkansas State Red Wolves men's basketball team. He led the program to a CBI appearance in 2024 and the 2025 NIT.

=== South Florida (2025–2026) ===
On March 24, 2025, Hodgson was named the head coach of the South Florida Bulls men's basketball team.

=== Providence (2026–present) ===
On March 22, 2026, Hodgson was named the head coach of the Providence Friars men's basketball team.

== Head coaching record ==
Record table
Season	Team	Overall	Conference	Standing	Postseason
Arkansas State Red Wolves (Sun Belt Conference) (2023–2025)
2023–24	Arkansas State	20–17	11–7	4th	CBI Semifinals
2024–25	Arkansas State	25–11	13–5	T–1st	NIT Second Round
Arkansas State:		45–28 (.616)	24–12 (.667)		
South Florida Bulls (The American) (2025–2026)
2025–26	South Florida	25–9	15–3	1st	NCAA Division I Round of 64
South Florida:		25–9 (.735)	15–3 (.833)		
Providence Friars (Big East Conference) (2026–present)
2026–27	Providence	4–1	0–0		
Providence:		3–1 (.750)	0–0 (–)		
Total:		73–38 (.658)			
National champion Postseason invitational champion Conference regular season champion Conference regular season and conference tournament champion Division regular season champion Division regular season and conference tournament champion Conference tournament champion
