= 2025–26 East Carolina Pirates men's basketball team =

American college basketball season

2025–26 East Carolina Pirates men's basketball
- Conference: American Conference
- Record: 11–20 (6–12 American)
- Head coach: Michael Schwartz (4th season)
- Assistant coaches: Riley Davis; Josh Giardina; I.J. Poole; Michael Perry
- Home arena: Williams Arena

2025–26 American Conference men's basketball standings
	Conf.				Overall
Team	W		L	PCT	W		L	PCT
South Florida	14	–	3	.824	22	–	8	.733
Wichita State	13	–	5	.722	21	–	10	.677
Tulsa	12	–	5	.706	24	–	6	.800
UAB	10	–	7	.588	19	–	11	.633
Charlotte	9	–	8	.529	15	–	15	.500
North Texas	9	–	9	.500	18	–	13	.581
Florida Atlantic	9	–	9	.500	17	–	14	.548
Tulane	8	–	9	.471	17	–	13	.567
Temple	8	–	9	.471	16	–	14	.533
Memphis	7	–	10	.412	12	–	18	.400
East Carolina	6	–	11	.353	11	–	19	.367
Rice	6	–	11	.353	12	–	18	.400
UTSA	1	–	16	.059	5	–	24	.172
† 2026 American tournament winner As of March 7, 2026

The 2025–26 East Carolina Pirates men's basketball team represented East Carolina University during the 2025–26 NCAA Division I men's basketball season. The Pirates, led by fourth-year head coach Michael Schwartz, played their home games at Williams Arena at Minges Coliseum in Greenville, North Carolina as eleventh-year members of the American Conference.

== Previous season ==
The Pirates finished the 2024–25 season 19–14, 10–8 in AAC play to finish in a tie for fifth place. As a No. 6 seed in the AAC tournament they defeated UTSA in the second round before falling to UAB in the quarterfinals.

== Preseason ==
On October 9, 2025, the American Conference released their preseason poll. East Carolina was picked to finish tenth in the conference.

=== Preseason rankings ===
American Conference Preseason Poll
Place	Team	Votes
1	Memphis	143 (11)
2	South Florida	128 (2)
3	Tulane	122
4	UAB	98
5	Wichita State	93
6	Florida Atlantic	80
7	North Texas	77
8	Tulsa	74
9	Temple	65
10	East Carolina	53
11	UTSA	32
12	Rice	27
13	Charlotte	22
(#) first-place votes

=== Preseason All-American Conference Teams ===
Preseason All-American Teams
Team	Player	Year	Position
First	Jordan Riley	Senior	Guard

== Roster ==
2025–26 East Carolina Pirates men's basketball team
Players
Coaches

Pos.	#	Name	Height	Weight	Year	Previous school	Hometown
G	0	Jayshayne Woodard	6 ft 7 in (2.01 m)	181 lb (82 kg)	Sr	Indian River State College	Harlem, New York
G	1	Jake Baker	6 ft 0 in (1.83 m)	174 lb (79 kg)	Fr	Cannon School	Concord, North Carolina
G	2	Isaiah Mbeng	6 ft 1 in (1.85 m)	183 lb (83 kg)	So	William & Mary	Potomac, Maryland
G	3	Daithi Quinn	6 ft 3 in (1.91 m)	206 lb (93 kg)	Fr	Tabor Academy	Quincy, Massachusetts
G	4	Tybo Bailey	6 ft 2 in (1.88 m)	187 lb (85 kg)	So	Winston-Salem Christian School	Winston-Salem, North Carolina
G	5	Corey Caulker	6 ft 0 in (1.83 m)	175 lb (79 kg)	Jr	Eastern Florida State College	Sterling, Virginia
G	6	Ladontae Felton	6 ft 2 in (1.88 m)	184 lb (83 kg)	RS Fr	South Aiken High School	Aiken, South Carolina
C	7	Giovanni Emejuru	6 ft 10 in (2.08 m)	262 lb (119 kg)	Sr	George Mason	Leicester, England
G	10	Paddy D'Arcy	6 ft 6 in (1.98 m)	189 lb (86 kg)	Fr	Adelaide 36ers	Adelaide, Australia
F/C	11	Vito Perkovic	6 ft 10 in (2.08 m)	250 lb (113 kg)	Fr	Hamilton Heights Christian Academy	Zadar, Croatia
G	12	Jordan Riley	6 ft 5 in (1.96 m)	210 lb (95 kg)	Sr	Temple	Brentwood, New York
F	23	Reid Cason	6 ft 10 in (2.08 m)	239 lb (108 kg)	So	Kingston High School	Kingston, Oklahoma
G/F	24	Trevion LaBeaux	6 ft 3 in (1.91 m)	209 lb (95 kg)	Sr	Indian Hills Community College	Waterloo, Iowa
F	33	Eli DeLaurier	6 ft 10 in (2.08 m)	238 lb (108 kg)	RS So	Providence	Shipman, Virginia
F	35	Grant Smith	6 ft 7 in (2.01 m)	207 lb (94 kg)	Sr	Quincy College	Richmond, Virginia
F	43	Luke Davis	6 ft 8 in (2.03 m)	224 lb (102 kg)	GS	New Orleans	Winterville, North Carolina

Head coach

- Michael Schwartz (Texas)

Assistant coach(es)

- Riley Davis (Texas)
- Josh Giardina (Marymount)
- I.J. Poole (Texas)
- Michael Perry (Richmond)

Legend

- (C) Team captain
- (S) Suspended
- (I) Ineligible
- (W) Walk-on
- Injured
- Current redshirt

Roster
Last update: December 7, 2025

== Schedule and results ==
Date time, TV	Rank^{#}	Opponent^{#}	Result	Record	High points	High rebounds	High assists	Site (attendance) city, state
Non-conference regular season
November 4, 2025*; 7:00 pm, ESPN+		Georgia Southern	W 92–89	1–0	22 – Riley	9 – Emejuru	8 – Mbeng	Williams Arena (3,259); Greenville, NC
November 8, 2025*; 6:00 pm, ESPN+		at Richmond	L 72–87	1–1	20 – Emejuru	13 – Emejuru	4 – Caulker	Robins Center (4,632); Richmond, VA
November 13, 2025*; 7:00 pm, ESPN+		Elizabeth City State	W 71–70	2–1	23 – Emejuru	11 – DeLaurier	4 – Tied	Williams Arena (4,238); Greenville, NC
November 18, 2025*; 7:00 pm, FloCollege		at UNC Wilmington	L 60−85	2−2	19 – Riley	6 – Cason	3 – Mbeng	Trask Coliseum (5,220); Wilmington, NC
November 21, 2025*; 7:00 pm, ESPN+		Charleston Southern	L 65−77	2−3	18 – Emejuru	12 – Emejuru	3 – Tied	Williams Arena (3,327); Greenville, NC
November 25, 2025*; 1:00 pm, FS2/BTN		vs. No. 11 Michigan State; Fort Myers Tip-Off Beach Division	L 56–89	2–4	13 – Riley	8 – Emejuru	4 – Caulker	Suncoast Credit Union Arena (3,500); Fort Myers, FL
November 27, 2025*; 12:00 pm, FS1		vs. St. Bonaventure; Fort Myers Tip-Off Beach Division	L 58–67	2–5	28 – Riley	11 – Emejuru	2 – Caulker	Suncoast Credit Union Arena (1,342); Fort Myers, FL
December 2, 2025*; 7:00 pm, ESPN+		Maryland Eastern Shore	W 68–56	3–5	18 – Riley	8 – Davis	5 – Riley	Williams Arena (2,883); Greenville, NC
December 6, 2025*; 4:00 pm, ESPN+		UNC Greensboro	L 78–82	3–6	25 – Riley	12 – Emejuru	4 – Caulker	Williams Arena (2,973); Greenville, NC
December 11, 2025*; 7:00 pm, ESPN+		Appalachian State	L 54–67	3–7	26 – Riley	8 – Emejuru	3 – Tied	Williams Arena (3,168); Greenville, NC
December 14, 2025*; 1:00 pm, ESPN+		Buffalo	W 73–70	4–7	31 – Riley	11 – Davis	4 – Caulker	Williams Arena (2,579); Greenville, NC
December 17, 2025*; 7:00 pm, ESPN+		Presbyterian	W 74–53	5–7	24 – Riley	7 – Emejuru	5 – Caulker	Williams Arena (2,663); Greenville, NC
December 22, 2025*; 8:00 pm, ACCN		at No. 12 North Carolina	L 51–99	5–8	21 – Emejuru	14 – Emejuru	6 – Mbeng	Dean Smith Center (20,479); Chapel Hill, NC
American regular season
December 31, 2025; 12:00 pm, ESPNU		Tulane	L 70−79	5−9 (0−1)	21 – Riley	9 – Emejuru	4 – Bailey	Williams Arena (2,992); Greenville, NC
January 7, 2026; 7:00 pm, ESPN+		at Temple	L 67–75	5–10 (0–2)	29 – Riley	9 – Emejuru	6 – Mbeng	Liacouras Center (2,128); Philadelphia, PA
January 11, 2026; 2:00 pm, ESPN+		UAB	L 85–87 ^{OT}	5–11 (0–3)	30 – Riley	12 – Emejuru	9 – Mbeng	Williams Arena (3,296); Greenville, NC
January 14, 2026; 7:00 pm, ESPN+		at South Florida	L 71–82	5–12 (0–4)	25 – Riley	10 – Tied	4 – Caulker	Yuengling Center (3,790); Tampa, FL
January 18, 2026; 2:00 pm, ESPN+		Charlotte	L 70–73	5–13 (0–5)	23 – Riley	6 – Emejuru	6 – Caulker	Williams Arena (3,574); Greenville, NC
January 21, 2026; 7:30 pm, ESPN+		at Wichita State	L 60–77	5–14 (0–6)	15 – Riley	11 – Emejuru	3 – Tied	Charles Koch Arena (5,588); Wichita, KS
January 24, 2026; 1:00 pm, ESPN+		at North Texas	W 63–59	6–14 (1–6)	15 – Riley	16 – Emejuru	6 – Caulker	The Super Pit (2,420); Denton, TX
January 28, 2026; 7:00 pm, ESPNU		Rice	L 77–83	6–15 (1–7)	37 – Riley	6 – Emejuru	9 – Caulker	Williams Arena (4,107); Greenville, NC
February 1, 2026; 2:00 pm, ESPN+		at Florida Atlantic	W 76–75	7–15 (2–7)	35 – Riley	9 – Riley	6 – Caulker	Eleanor R. Baldwin Arena (3,161); Boca Raton, FL
February 7, 2026; 12:00 pm, ESPNU		Temple	L 73–81	7–16 (2–8)	32 – Riley	14 – Emejuru	3 – Tied	Williams Arena (4,010); Greenville, NC
February 11, 2026; 7:00 pm, ESPN+		UTSA	W 88–72	8–16 (3–8)	19 – Riley	12 – Emejuru	6 – Mbeng	Williams Arena (3,008); Greenville, NC
February 14, 2026; 2:00 pm, ESPN+		at Rice	W 85–75	9–16 (4–8)	22 – Riley	7 – Emejuru	4 – Tied	Tudor Fieldhouse (1,789); Houston, TX
February 18, 2026; 7:00 pm, ESPN+		Wichita State	L 89–92 ^{2OT}	9–17 (4–9)	40 – Riley	14 – DeLaurier	5 – Mbeng	Williams Arena (3,150); Greenville, NC
February 21, 2026; 12:00 pm, ESPN2		at Charlotte	L 56–68	9–18 (4–10)	20 – Riley	12 – Emejuru	2 – Tied	Dale F. Halton Arena (3,583); Charlotte, NC
February 25, 2026; 8:00 pm, ESPN+		at UTSA	W 82–81	10–18 (5–10)	27 – Riley	6 – Tied	6 – Caulker	Convocation Center (1,037); San Antonio, TX
March 1, 2026; 2:00 pm, ESPN+		Memphis	W 84–68	11–18 (6–10)	31 – Riley	12 – Riley	11 – Caulker	Williams Arena (4,195); Greenville, NC
March 5, 2026; 7:00 pm, ESPNU		Tulsa	L 66–93	11–19 (6–11)	26 – Riley	9 – Davis	6 – Riley	Williams Arena (3,782); Greenville, NC
March 8, 2026; 3:00 pm, ESPN+		at UAB	L 83–90	11–20 (6–12)	19 – Gardner	14 – Emejuru	5 – Caulker	Bartow Arena (4,123); Birmingham, AL
*Non-conference game. ^{#}Rankings from AP Poll. (#) Tournament seedings in parentheses. All times are in Eastern.
