= 2025–26 Memphis Tigers men's basketball team =

American college basketball season

2025–26 Memphis Tigers men's basketball
- Conference: American Conference
- Record: 13–19 (8–10 American)
- Head coach: Penny Hardaway (8th season)
- Assistant coaches: Mike Davis; Jermaine Johnson; Roy Rogers
- Home arena: FedExForum (Capacity: 18,119)

2025–26 American Conference men's basketball standings
	Conf.				Overall
Team	W		L	PCT	W		L	PCT
South Florida †	15	–	3	.833	25	–	9	.735
Wichita State	13	–	5	.722	24	–	12	.667
Tulsa	13	–	5	.722	30	–	8	.789
UAB	11	–	7	.611	20	–	12	.625
Charlotte	9	–	9	.500	17	–	17	.500
North Texas	9	–	9	.500	19	–	14	.576
Florida Atlantic	9	–	9	.500	18	–	15	.545
Memphis	8	–	10	.444	13	–	19	.406
Tulane	8	–	10	.444	18	–	15	.545
Temple	8	–	10	.444	16	–	16	.500
Rice	7	–	11	.389	13	–	18	.419
East Carolina	6	–	12	.333	11	–	20	.355
UTSA	1	–	17	.056	5	–	25	.167
† 2026 American tournament winner

The 2025–26 Memphis Tigers men's basketball team represented the University of Memphis in the 2025–26 NCAA Division I men's basketball season. The Tigers, led by eighth-year head coach Penny Hardaway, played their home games at FedExForum as members of the American Conference, formerly known as the American Athletic Conference. They finished the season 13–19, 8–10 in American play. They were defeated by Tulane in the first round of the American tournament and did not qualify for any postseason play.

== Previous season ==
The Tigers finished the 2024–25 season 29–6, 16–2 in AAC play to win the conference championship. They defeated Wichita State, Tulane, and UAB to win the AAC tournament championship. As a result, they received the conference's automatic bid to the NCAA tournament as the No. 5 seed in the West region. There they were upset in the first round by Colorado State.

== Preseason ==
On October 9, 2025, the American Conference released its preseason poll. Memphis was picked to finish atop the conference, while receiving eleven first-place votes.

=== Preseason rankings ===
American Preseason Poll
Place	Team	Votes
1	Memphis	143 (11)
2	South Florida	128 (2)
3	Tulane	122
4	UAB	98
5	Wichita State	93
6	Florida Atlantic	80
7	North Texas	77
8	Tulsa	74
9	Temple	65
10	East Carolina	53
11	UTSA	32
12	Rice	27
13	Charlotte	22
(#) first-place votes

=== Preseason All-American Teams ===
Preseason All-Conference Teams
Team	Player	Year	Position
First	Aaron Bradshaw	Junior	Forward
First	Dug McDaniel	Senior	Guard

== Roster ==
2025–26 Memphis Tigers men's basketball team
Players
Coaches

Pos.	#	Name	Height	Weight	Year	Previous school	Hometown
G	0	Quante Berry	6 ft 4 in (1.93 m)	185 lb (84 kg)	RS Jr	Temple	Cleveland, Tennessee
G	1	Dug McDaniel	5 ft 11 in (1.8 m)	170 lb (77 kg)	Sr	Kansas State	Washington, D.C.
G	2	Zach Davis	6 ft 7 in (2.01 m)	205 lb (93 kg)	Sr	South Carolina	Orangeburg, South Carolina
F	3	Ashton Hardaway	6 ft 8 in (2.03 m)	225 lb (102 kg)	Jr	Saint Mary's	Carson, California
F	4	Arop Arop	6 ft 11 in (2.11 m)	180 lb (82 kg)	Jr	Columbia	Dallas, Texas
G	5	Curtis Givens III	6 ft 3 in (1.91 m)	190 lb (86 kg)	So	LSU	Memphis, Tennessee
F	8	Mason Matthews	6 ft 8 in (2.03 m)	210 lb (95 kg)	Sr	Lane College	Maumelle, Arkansas
C	10	Simon Majok	7 ft 1 in (2.16 m)	220 lb (100 kg)	Fr	KK Real Beograd	Akak, South Sudan
F	11	Aaron Bradshaw	7 ft 1 in (2.16 m)	225 lb (102 kg)	Jr	Ohio State	Rahway, New Jersey
F	12	William Whorton	6 ft 8 in (2.03 m)	210 lb (95 kg)	RS So	South Dakota State	Milwaukee, Wisconsin
G	14	Hasan Abdul Hakim	6 ft 8 in (2.03 m)	230 lb (104 kg)	Sr	UT Rio Grande Valley	Toronto, Ontario
G	15	Julius Thedford	6 ft 4 in (1.93 m)	195 lb (88 kg)	So	Western Kentucky	Memphis, Tennessee
F	19	Tariq Ingraham	6 ft 9 in (2.06 m)	260 lb (118 kg)	GS	Rider	Philadelphia, Pennsylvania
G	23	Sincere Parker	6 ft 3 in (1.91 m)	210 lb (95 kg)	Sr	McNeese	Rockford, Illinois
C	31	Thierno Sylla	6 ft 11 in (2.11 m)	210 lb (95 kg)	Sr	Stephen F. Austin	Conakry, Guinea

Head coach

- Penny Hardaway (Memphis)

Assistant coach(es)

- Mike Davis (Alabama)
- Jermaine Johnson (UT Arlington)
- Roy Rogers (Alabama)

Legend

- (C) Team captain
- (S) Suspended
- (I) Ineligible
- (W) Walk-on
- Injured
- Current redshirt

Roster
Last update: December 6, 2025

== Schedule and results ==
Date time, TV	Rank^{#}	Opponent^{#}	Result	Record	High points	High rebounds	High assists	Site (attendance) city, state
Exhibition
October 27, 2025; 8:00 p.m., ESPNU		No. 14 Arkansas; Hoops for St. Jude Tip Off Classic	L 75–99	–	19 – McDaniel	6 – Berry	6 – McDaniel	FedEx Forum (9,573); Memphis, TN
October 30, 2025*; 7:30 p.m., WarEagle+		vs. No. 20 Auburn; Bad Boy Mowers Series	L 71–100	–	19 – Parker	7 – Majok	3 – Thedford	State Farm Arena (1,500); Atlanta, GA
Regular season
November 8, 2025*; 2:00 p.m., ESPN+		San Francisco	W 76–70	1–0	17 – Berry	9 – Thedford	8 – McDaniel	FedEx Forum (10,389); Memphis, TN
November 11, 2025*; 8:00 p.m., SECN		at Ole Miss; Rivalry	L 77–83	1–1	20 – Givens III	7 – McDaniel	7 – McDaniel	SJB Pavilion (8,731); Oxford, MS
November 16, 2025*; 4:00 p.m., ESPN		UNLV	L 78–92	1–2	16 – Thedford	7 – Majok	3 – Tied	FedEx Forum (10,927); Memphis, TN
November 20, 2025*; 5:00 p.m., CBSSN		vs. No. 1 Purdue; Baha Mar Championship Semifinal	L 71–80	1–3	18 – McDaniel	7 – Majok	6 – McDaniel	Baha Mar Convention Center (2,437); Nassau, Bahamas
November 21, 2025*; 6:00 p.m., CBSSN		vs. Wake Forest; Baha Mar Championsip 3rd place game	L 68–69	1–4	24 – McDaniel	6 – Whorton	6 – McDaniel	Baha Mar Convention Center; Nassau, Bahamas
November 26, 2025*; 7:00 p.m., ESPN+		Southern Illinois	W 74–58	2–4	15 – Thedford	6 – Thedford	5 – McDaniel	FedEx Forum (9,681); Memphis, TN
December 3, 2025*; 7:00 p.m., ESPN+		New Orleans	W 86–70	3–4	17 – Berry	9 – Davis	10 – McDaniel	FedEx Forum (9,123); Memphis, TN
December 6, 2025*; 3:30 p.m., CBS		Baylor	W 78–71	4–4	23 – Davis	13 – Davis	7 – McDaniel	FedEx Forum (11,392); Memphis, TN
December 13, 2025*; 2:30 p.m., ESPN		at No. 11 Louisville; Rivalry	L 73–99	4–5	18 – Abdul Hakim	5 – Bradshaw	3 – Tied	KFC Yum! Center (16,355); Louisville, KY
December 17, 2025*; 6:00 p.m., ESPN2		No. 13 Vanderbilt	L 70–77 ^{OT}	4–6	18 – Tied	10 – Abdul Hakim	4 – McDaniel	FedEx Forum (11,407); Memphis, TN
December 20, 2025*; 3:00 p.m., ESPN		at Mississippi State	L 66–71	4–7	18 – Givens III	8 – Thedford	3 – McDaniel	Humphrey Coliseum (6,971); Starkville, MS
December 22, 2025*; 7:00 p.m., ESPN+		Alabama State	W 88–67	5–7	23 – McDaniel	10 – Thedford	3 – Tied	FedEx Forum (9,673); Memphis, TN
December 31, 2025; 3:00 p.m., ESPN2		North Texas	W 57−48	6−7 (1−0)	12 – Davis	6 – Davis	6 – McDaniel	FedEx Forum (9,685); Memphis, TN
January 3, 2026; 2:00 p.m., ESPN+		at Rice	W 76−70	7−7 (2−0)	18 – McDaniel	6 – McDaniel	4 – McDaniel	Tudor Fieldhouse (2,038); Houston, TX
January 11, 2026; 12:00 p.m., ESPN2		at Florida Atlantic	L 78–89	7–8 (2–1)	21 – Bradshaw	5 – Bradshaw	6 – Abdul Hakim	Eleanor R. Baldwin Arena (3,161); Boca Raton, FL
January 14, 2026; 7:00 p.m., ESPN+		Temple	W 55–53	8–8 (3–1)	12 – Givens III	9 – McDaniel	4 – McDaniel	FedEx Forum (9,610); Memphis, TN
January 18, 2026; 5:00 p.m., ESPNU		UTSA	W 95–69	9–8 (4–1)	22 – Parker	6 – McDaniel	6 – McDaniel	FedEx Forum (9,877); Memphis, TN
January 21, 2026; 7:00 p.m., ESPN+		at Tulsa	L 66–83	9–9 (4–2)	18 – Hardaway	10 – Abdul Hakim	5 – Givens III	Reynolds Center (4,071); Tulsa, OK
January 24, 2026; 3:00 p.m., ESPN2		at Wichita State	L 59–74	9–10 (4–3)	11 – Givens III	9 – Bradshaw	3 – McDaniel	Charles Koch Arena (6,226); Wichita, KS
January 29, 2026; 7:00 p.m., ESPN2		Florida Atlantic	W 92–65	10–10 (5–3)	23 – McDaniel	6 – Davis	6 – McDaniel	FedEx Forum (5,074); Memphis, TN
February 1, 2026; 2:00 p.m., ESPN2		Tulane	L 76–78	10–11 (5–4)	13 – McDaniel	9 – Bradshaw	4 – McDaniel	FedEx Forum (9,320); Memphis, TN
February 5, 2026; 8:00 p.m., ESPN2		at UAB; Battle for the Bones	W 90–80	11–11 (6–4)	40 – Parker	8 – Sylla	4 – McDaniel	Bartow Arena (5,819); Birmingham, AL
February 8, 2026; 1:00 p.m., ESPN+		Charlotte	W 77–54	12–11 (7–4)	16 – Bradshaw	11 – Thedford	4 – Tied	FedEx Forum (9,147); Memphis, TN
February 12, 2026; 8:00 p.m., ESPN2		at North Texas	L 69–76	12–12 (7–5)	20 – Parker	5 – Davis	4 – McDaniel	UNT Coliseum (3,395); Denton, TX
February 14, 2026*; 7:00 p.m., CBSSN		at Utah State	L 75–99	12–13	21 – Parker	10 – Parker	3 – McDaniel	Dee Glen Smith Spectrum (10,270); Logan, UT
February 19, 2026; 6:00 p.m., ESPN2		at South Florida	L 66–87	12–14 (7–6)	13 – Thedford	5 – Tied	6 – McDaniel	Yuengling Center (6,705); Tampa, FL
February 22, 2026; 11:00 a.m., ESPN2		UAB; Battle for the Bones	L 67–78	12–15 (7–7)	19 – McDaniel	8 – Thedford	3 – Tied	FedEx Forum (9,541); Memphis, TN
February 26, 2026; 8:00 p.m., ESPN2		Wichita State	L 82–88	12–16 (7–8)	29 – McDaniel	8 – Parker	3 – McDaniel	FedEx Forum (9,233); Memphis, TN
March 1, 2026; 1:00 p.m., ESPN+		at East Carolina	L 68–84	12–17 (7–9)	16 – Thedford	9 – Thedford	5 – McDaniel	Williams Arena (4,195); Greenville, NC
March 5, 2026; 8:00 p.m., ESPN2		South Florida	L 89–96	12–18 (7–10)	25 – McDaniel	8 – Davis	7 – McDaniel	FedEx Forum (9,643); Memphis, TN
March 8, 2026; 1:00 p.m., ESPN+		at Tulane	W 96–95 ^{OT}	13–18 (8–10)	22 – Berry	8 – Davis	6 – McDaniel	Devlin Fieldhouse (1,731); New Orleans, LA
American tournament
March 11, 2026; 6:00 p.m., ESPNU	(8)	vs. (9) Tulane; First round	L 69–81	13–19	13 – Thedford	8 – Davis	3 – Givens III	Legacy Arena; Birmingham, AL
*Non-conference game. ^{#}Rankings from AP poll. (#) Tournament seedings in parentheses. All times are in Central Time.
