= 2025–26 South Florida Bulls men's basketball team =

American college basketball team

2025–26 South Florida Bulls men's basketball

American regular season and tournament champions

NCAA tournament, First round
- Conference: American Conference
- Record: 25–9 (15–3 American)
- Head coach: Bryan Hodgson (1st season)
- Associate head coach: Tee Butters
- Assistant coaches: Jamie Quarles; Derek Rongstad; Logan Ingram
- Home arena: Yuengling Center; Tampa, Florida

2025–26 American Conference men's basketball standings
| | Conf. | | | | Overall |
| Team | W | | L | PCT | W | | L | PCT |
|---|---|---|---|---|---|---|---|---|
| South Florida † | 15 | – | 3 | .833 | 25 | – | 9 | .735 |
| Wichita State | 13 | – | 5 | .722 | 24 | – | 12 | .667 |
| Tulsa | 13 | – | 5 | .722 | 30 | – | 8 | .789 |
| UAB | 11 | – | 7 | .611 | 20 | – | 12 | .625 |
| Charlotte | 9 | – | 9 | .500 | 17 | – | 17 | .500 |
| North Texas | 9 | – | 9 | .500 | 19 | – | 14 | .576 |
| Florida Atlantic | 9 | – | 9 | .500 | 18 | – | 15 | .545 |
| Memphis | 8 | – | 10 | .444 | 13 | – | 19 | .406 |
| Tulane | 8 | – | 10 | .444 | 18 | – | 15 | .545 |
| Temple | 8 | – | 10 | .444 | 16 | – | 16 | .500 |
| Rice | 7 | – | 11 | .389 | 13 | – | 18 | .419 |
| East Carolina | 6 | – | 12 | .333 | 11 | – | 20 | .355 |
| UTSA | 1 | – | 17 | .056 | 5 | – | 25 | .167 |
† 2026 American tournament winner

The 2025–26 South Florida Bulls men's basketball team represented the University of South Florida during the 2025–26 NCAA Division I men's basketball season. This season marked the 53rd basketball season for USF, and the 12th as a member of the American Conference. The Bulls played their home games at Yuengling Center on the university's Tampa, Florida campus. They were led by first-year head coach Bryan Hodgson.

== Previous season ==
The Bulls' 2024–25 season was marred by the unexpected death of head coach Amir Abdur-Rahim just ahead of the season on October 24, 2024. On October 29, the school appointed Ben Fletcher as interim coach for the season. The Bulls finished the season 13–19, going 6–12 in conference play to finish in 9th place. The team faced Wichita State in the first round of the AAC tournament, losing 73–68 and ending their season.

== Preseason ==
On October 9, 2025, the American Conference released their preseason poll. South Florida was picked to finish second in the conference, while receiving two first-place votes.

=== Preseason rankings ===
American Conference Preseason Poll
| Place | Team | Votes |
|---|---|---|
| 1 | Memphis | 143 (11) |
| 2 | South Florida | 128 (2) |
| 3 | Tulane | 122 |
| 4 | UAB | 98 |
| 5 | Wichita State | 93 |
| 6 | Florida Atlantic | 80 |
| 7 | North Texas | 77 |
| 8 | Tulsa | 74 |
| 9 | Temple | 65 |
| 10 | East Carolina | 53 |
| 11 | UTSA | 32 |
| 12 | Rice | 27 |
| 13 | Charlotte | 22 |
(#) first-place votes

=== Preseason All-American Conference Teams ===
Preseason All-American Conference Teams
| Team | Player | Year | Position |
|---|---|---|---|
| Second | Izaiyah Nelson | Senior | Forward |
| Second | Daimion Collins | Redshirt Senior | Forward |

== Roster ==
2025–26 South Florida Bulls men's basketball team
Players
Coaches

| Pos. | # | Name | Height | Weight | Year | Previous school | Hometown |
|---|---|---|---|---|---|---|---|
| G | 0 | Xavier Brown | 6 ft 2 in (1.88 m) | 183 lb (83 kg) | Sr | James Madison | Williamsburg, Virginia |
| F | 1 | De'Ante Green | 6 ft 9 in (2.06 m) | 210 lb (95 kg) | Sr | Florida State | Asheville, North Carolina |
| G | 2 | Wes Enis | 6 ft 2 in (1.88 m) | 200 lb (91 kg) | Jr | Lincoln Memorial | Conover, Ohio |
| F | 3 | Isaiah Jones | 6 ft 7 in (2.01 m) | 229 lb (104 kg) | Sr | Oakland | Nashville, Tennessee |
| G | 4 | Devin Haid | 6 ft 5 in (1.96 m) | 190 lb (86 kg) | Sr | Central Connecticut | Wooster, Ohio |
| G | 5 | Joseph Pinion | 6 ft 5 in (1.96 m) | 200 lb (91 kg) | Sr | Arkansas State | Morrilton, Arkansas |
| F | 6 | Daimion Collins | 6 ft 9 in (2.06 m) | 200 lb (91 kg) | RS Sr | LSU | Atlanta, Texas |
| F | 7 | Caleb Sanders | 6 ft 6 in (1.98 m) | 185 lb (84 kg) | Fr | North Tampa Christian Academy | Tampa, Florida |
| G | 8 | Josh Omojafo | 6 ft 5 in (1.96 m) | 200 lb (91 kg) | Sr | Robert Morris | Hamilton, Ontario |
| G | 9 | Gavin Hightower | 6 ft 1 in (1.85 m) | 165 lb (75 kg) | Fr | Sierra Canyon School | Los Angeles, California |
| F | 10 | Tristan Beckford | 6 ft 5 in (1.96 m) | 180 lb (82 kg) | Fr | Fort Erie International Academy | Maple, Ontario |
| G | 11 | CJ Brown | 6 ft 2 in (1.88 m) | 175 lb (79 kg) | So | Kell High School | Marietta, Georgia |
| F | 15 | Onyx Nnani | 6 ft 9 in (2.06 m) | 215 lb (98 kg) | Fr | The Phelps School | Edmonton, Alberta |
| G | 21 | Adriel Nyorha | 6 ft 5 in (1.96 m) | 175 lb (79 kg) | Fr | Winston Salem Christian School | Ottawa, Ontario |
| F | 35 | Izaiyah Nelson | 6 ft 10 in (2.08 m) | 218 lb (99 kg) | Sr | Arkansas State | Marietta, Georgia |

Head coach

- Bryan Hodgson (Fredonia State)

Assistant coach(es)

- Tee Butters (Clemson)
- Jamie Quarles (Augusta State)
- Derek Rongstad (UW–Whitewater)
- Logan Ingram (Alabama)

Legend

- (C) Team captain
- (S) Suspended
- (I) Ineligible
- (W) Walk-on
- Injured
- Current redshirt

Roster
Last update: December 6, 2025

== Schedule and results ==
| Date time, TV | Rank^{#} | Opponent^{#} | Result | Record | High points | High rebounds | High assists | Site (attendance) city, state |
Exhibition
| October 24, 2025*; 7:00 p.m. | | Saint Leo | W 120–63 | – | – | – | – | Yuengling Center; Tampa, FL |
Non-conference regular season
| November 3, 2025*; 8:00 p.m., ESPN+ | | Florida A&M | W 102–67 | 1–0 | 22 – Enis | 10 – Nelson | 5 – Omojafo | Yuengling Center (6,531); Tampa, FL |
| November 8, 2025*; 1:30 p.m., Peacock | | vs. George Washington; Hall of Fame Tip-Off | L 95–99 | 1–1 | 33 – Omojafo | 7 – Tied | 4 – CJ Brown | Mohegan Sun Arena; Uncasville, CT |
| November 12, 2025*; 7:00 p.m., ESPN+ | | Coppin State | W 100–50 | 2–1 | 24 – Pinion | 13 – Nelson | 6 – Omojafo | Yuengling Center (3,208); Tampa, FL |
| November 16, 2025*; 2:00 p.m., ESPN+ | | at Kennesaw State; Love Wins Classic | W 108–89 | 3–1 | 24 – Pinion | 11 – Nelson | 4 – CJ Brown | Convocation Center (2,167); Kennesaw, GA |
| November 19, 2025*; 8:00 p.m., ESPN+ | | at Oklahoma State | L 95–103 | 3–2 | 24 – CJ Brown | 7 – Omojafo | 10 – CJ Brown | Gallagher-Iba Arena (5,848); Stillwater, OK |
| November 26, 2025*; 2:30 p.m., ESPN2 | | vs. VCU; Battle 4 Atlantis quarterfinals | L 66–78 | 3–3 | 16 – Nelson | 12 – Nelson | 5 – CJ Brown | Imperial Arena (446); Paradise Island, The Bahamas |
| November 27, 2025*; 5:30 p.m., ESPN2 | | vs. Western Kentucky; Battle 4 Atlantis consolation semifinals | W 97–91 ^{OT} | 4–3 | 18 – CJ Brown | 11 – Nelson | 9 – CJ Brown | Imperial Arena (393); Paradise Island, The Bahamas |
| November 28, 2025*; 4:30 p.m., ESPNU | | vs. Colorado State; Battle 4 Atlantis 5th place game | L 68–83 | 4–4 | 17 – Enis | 8 – Nelson | 6 – Nyorha | Imperial Arena (371); Paradise Island, The Bahamas |
| December 4, 2025*; 7:00 p.m., ESPN+ | | Utah State | W 74–61 | 5–4 | 17 – Pinion | 10 – Nelson | 5 – CJ Brown | Yuengling Center (4,131); Tampa, FL |
| December 10, 2025*; 7:00 p.m., ESPN+ | | Charleston | W 81–75 | 6–4 | 21 – Pinion | 9 – Tied | 5 – CJ Brown | Yuengling Center (3,199); Tampa, FL |
| December 17, 2025*; 8:00 p.m., SECN+ | | at No. 16 Alabama | L 93–104 | 6–5 | 25 – Nelson | 12 – Nelson | 5 – Tied | Coleman Coliseum (11,256); Tuscaloosa, AL |
| December 21, 2025*; 3:00 p.m., ESPN+ | | UMBC | W 94–69 | 7–5 | 25 – Pinion | 11 – Nelson | 7 – CJ Brown | Yuengling Center (5,509); Tampa, FL |
| December 29, 2025*; 4:30 p.m., ESPN+ | | Georgia College | W 111–50 | 8–5 | 25 – Nelson | 12 – Nelson | 8 – CJ Brown | Yuengling Center (3,391); Tampa, FL |
American regular season
| January 4, 2026; 1:00 p.m., ESPNU | | UAB | L 106–109 ^{2OT} | 8–6 (0–1) | 36 – Enis | 11 – Nelson | 5 – Tied | Yuengling Center (3,397); Tampa, FL |
| January 7, 2026; 8:00 p.m., ESPN+ | | at North Texas | W 74–70 | 9–6 (1–1) | 17 – Nelson | 10 – Nelson | 3 – Tied | The Super Pit (2,645); Denton, TX |
| January 10, 2026; 3:00 p.m., ESPN+ | | at Tulsa | W 93–78 | 10–6 (2–1) | 32 – Enis | 14 – Nelson | 5 – Nyorha | Reynolds Center (3,303); Tulsa, OK |
| January 14, 2026; 7:00 p.m., ESPN+ | | East Carolina | W 82–71 | 11–6 (3–1) | 18 – Omojafo | 7 – Nelson | 5 – Enis | Yuengling Center (3,790); Tampa, FL |
| January 18, 2026; 2:00 p.m., ESPNU | | Wichita State | L 85–86 ^{OT} | 11–7 (3–2) | 21 – Pinion | 9 – Nelson | 8 – CJ Brown | Yuengling Center (4,544); Tampa, FL |
| January 22, 2026; 7:00 p.m., ESPN2 | | at UAB | W 82–69 | 12–7 (4–2) | 23 – Pinion | 10 – Nelson | 9 – CJ Brown | Bartow Arena (4,338); Birmingham, AL |
| January 25, 2026; 1:00 p.m., ESPN2 | | Florida Atlantic | W 89–75 | 13–7 (5–2) | 19 – Enis | 12 – Nelson | 7 – CJ Brown | Yuengling Center (4,833); Tampa, FL |
| January 28, 2026; 9:00 p.m., ESPNU | | at Tulane | W 97–83 | 14–7 (6–2) | 25 – Enis | 12 – Nelson | 4 – Tied | Devlin Fieldhouse (1,279); New Orleans, LA |
| January 31, 2026; 8:00 p.m., ESPN2 | | at Temple | L 78–79 | 14–8 (6–3) | 18 – Nelson | 8 – Nelson | 6 – CJ Brown | Liacouras Center (4,050); Philadelphia, PA |
| February 4, 2026; 7:00 p.m., ESPN+ | | UTSA | W 109–88 | 15–8 (7–3) | 25 – Nelson | 9 – Haid | 10 – Pinion | Yuengling Center (3,371); Tampa, FL |
| February 8, 2026; 12:00 p.m., ESPNU | | Tulsa | W 80–74 | 16–8 (8–3) | 25 – Nelson | 10 – Nelson | 8 – CJ Brown | Yuengling Center (4,030); Tampa, FL |
| February 11, 2026; 7:30 p.m., ESPN+ | | at Wichita State | W 66–58 | 17–8 (9–3) | 16 – Enis | 11 – Enis | 4 – Hightower | Charles Koch Arena (6,676); Wichita, KS |
| February 15, 2026; 2:00 p.m., ESPN2 | | at Florida Atlantic | W 83–81 ^{OT} | 18–8 (10–3) | 27 – Enis | 10 – Nelson | 3 – CJ Brown | Eleanor R. Baldwin Arena (3,161); Boca Raton, FL |
| February 19, 2026; 7:00 p.m., ESPN2 | | Memphis | W 87–66 | 19–8 (11–3) | 20 – Enis | 14 – Nelson | 8 – CJ Brown | Yuengling Center (6,705); Tampa, FL |
| February 25, 2026; 8:00 p.m., ESPN+ | | at Rice | W 75–56 | 20–8 (12–3) | 24 – Nelson | 8 – Nelson | 3 – Tied | Tudor Fieldhouse (1,222); Houston, TX |
| March 1, 2026; 12:00 p.m., ESPN2 | | Tulane | W 90–62 | 21–8 (13–3) | 25 – Enis | 13 – Nelson | 6 – Nelson | Yuengling Center (6,579); Tampa, FL |
| March 5, 2026; 9:00 p.m., ESPN2 | | at Memphis | W 96–89 | 22–8 (14–3) | 29 – Enis | 8 – Pinion | 5 – Pinion | FedExForum (9,643); Memphis, TN |
| March 8, 2026; 2:00 p.m., ESPN+ | | Charlotte | W 83–60 | 23–8 (15–3) | 22 – Pinion | 7 – Enis | 6 – Tied | Yuengling Center (6,710); Tampa, FL |
American tournament
| March 14, 2026; 3:00 p.m., ESPN2 | (1) | vs. (5) Charlotte; Semifinal | W 86–64 | 24–8 | 24 – Tied | 10 – Omojafo | 5 – Enis | Legacy Arena; Birmingham, AL |
| March 15, 2026; 3:15 p.m., ESPN | (1) | vs. (2) Wichita State; Championship | W 70–55 | 25–8 | 19 – Enis | 7 – Jones | 3 – Tied | Legacy Arena; Birmingham, AL |
NCAA tournament
| March 19, 2026*; 1:30 p.m., TNT | (11 E) | vs. (6 E) No. 23 Louisville; First round | L 79–83 | 25–9 | 27 – Pinion | 9 – Nelson | 6 – Pinion | KeyBank Center (17,182); Buffalo, NY |
*Non-conference game. ^{#}Rankings from AP poll. (#) Tournament seedings in parentheses. E=East. All times are in Eastern Time.
