= 2026 American Conference men's basketball tournament =

- Classification: Division I
- Season: 2025–26
- Teams: 10
- Site: Legacy Arena; Birmingham, Alabama
- Champions: South Florida (1st title)
- Winning coach: Bryan Hodgson (1st title)
- MVP: Wes Enis (South Florida)
- Television: ESPN, ESPN2, ESPNU, ESPNews, ESPN+

2025–26 American Conference men's basketball standings
	Conf.				Overall
Team	W		L	PCT	W		L	PCT
South Florida †	15	–	3	.833	25	–	9	.735
Wichita State	13	–	5	.722	24	–	12	.667
Tulsa	13	–	5	.722	30	–	8	.789
UAB	11	–	7	.611	20	–	12	.625
Charlotte	9	–	9	.500	17	–	17	.500
North Texas	9	–	9	.500	19	–	14	.576
Florida Atlantic	9	–	9	.500	18	–	15	.545
Memphis	8	–	10	.444	13	–	19	.406
Tulane	8	–	10	.444	18	–	15	.545
Temple	8	–	10	.444	16	–	16	.500
Rice	7	–	11	.389	13	–	18	.419
East Carolina	6	–	12	.333	11	–	20	.355
UTSA	1	–	17	.056	5	–	25	.167
† 2026 American tournament winner

The 2026 American Conference men's basketball tournament was the postseason men's basketball tournament for the American Conference for the 2025–26 season. The tournament was held from March 11–15, 2026, at Legacy Arena in Birmingham, Alabama. The winner, South Florida, received the conference's automatic bid to the 2026 NCAA tournament.

This was the first conference tournament under the American Conference name. In July 2025, the conference dropped the word "Athletic" from its name, renaming itself the American Conference.

== Seeds ==
Only the top ten conference teams will qualify to participate in the tournament. Teams will be seeded by conference record. The conference adopted a stepladder format for the tournament, with the top two seeds receiving byes to the semifinals, the third and fourth seeds to the quarterfinals, and so on.

Tiebreakers may be applied as needed to properly seed the teams.

Seed	School	Conference record	Tiebreaker 1	Tiebreaker 2
1	South Florida	15–3		
2	Wichita State	13–5	1–1 vs. South Florida	
3	Tulsa	13–5	0–2 vs. South Florida	
4	UAB	11–7		
5	Charlotte	9–9	2–0 vs. Rice	
6	North Texas	9–9	1–1 vs. Rice	1–0 vs. Florida Atlantic
7	Florida Atlantic	9–9	0–1 vs. Rice	0–1 vs. North Texas
8	Memphis	8–10	2–1 vs. Tulane/Temple	
9	Tulane	8–10	2–2 vs. Memphis/Temple	
10	Temple	8–10	1–2 vs. Memphis/Tulane	
DNQ	Rice	7–11		
DNQ	East Carolina	6–12		
DNQ	UTSA	1–17		

== Venue ==
Birmingham was announced as the host city in May 2025, with Legacy Arena serving as the venue for the second consecutive year.

== Schedule ==
Game	Time *	Matchup	Score	Television
First Round – Wednesday, March 11
1	6:00 p.m.	No. 8 Memphis vs. No. 9 Tulane	69–81	ESPNEWS
2	8:00 p.m.	No. 7 Florida Atlantic vs. No. 10 Temple	63–59	ESPN+
Second Round – Thursday, March 12
3	6:00 p.m.	No. 5 Charlotte vs. No. 9 Tulane	74–60	ESPNU
4	8:00 p.m.	No. 6 North Texas vs. No. 7 Florida Atlantic	74–70	ESPNU
Quarterfinals – Friday March 13
5	12:00 p.m.	No. 4 UAB vs. No. 5 Charlotte	78–83	ESPN2
6	2:00 p.m.	No. 3 Tulsa vs. No. 6 North Texas	90–84 ^{3OT}	ESPN2
Semifinals – Saturday, March 14
7	2:00 p.m.	No. 1 South Florida vs. No. 5 Charlotte	86–64	ESPN2
8	4:00 p.m.	No. 2 Wichita State vs. No. 3 Tulsa	81–68	ESPN2
Final – Sunday, March 15
9	2:15 p.m.	No. 1 South Florida vs. No. 2 Wichita State	70–55	ESPN
* Game times in CDT; ()-ranking denotes tournament seeding.

== Bracket ==
First Round; March 11; ESPNEWS, ESPN+
8	Memphis	69
9	Tulane	81
7	Florida Atlantic	63
10	Temple	59

Second Round; March 12; ESPNU
5	Charlotte	74
9	Tulane	60
6	North Texas	74
7	Florida Atlantic	70

Quarterfinals; March 13; ESPN2
4	UAB	78
5	Charlotte	83
3	Tulsa	90
6	North Texas	84 ^{3OT}

Semifinals; March 14; ESPN2
1	South Florida	86
5	Charlotte	64
2	Wichita State	81
3	Tulsa	68

Final; March 15; ESPN
1	South Florida	70
2	Wichita State	55

== Game Summaries ==
=== First Round ===
ESPNews

March 11
6:00 p.m. CDT

Recap

No. 8 Memphis 69, No. 9 Tulane 81
Scoring by half: 31–39, 38–42
Pts: 13 – Thedford; Rebs: 8 – Davis; Asts: 3 – Givens III	Pts: 35 – Brumbaugh; Rebs: 8 – Brumbaugh; Asts: 3 – Tied (2)
Game 1

Legacy Arena
Birmingham, AL
Referees: Evans, Nance, Poole

ESPN+

March 11
8:00 p.m. CDT

Recap

No. 7 Florida Atlantic 63, No. 10 Temple 59
Scoring by half: 29–27, 34–32
Pts: 19 – Moretti; Rebs: 6 – Tied (2); Asts: 3 – Moretti	Pts: 16 – Ford; Rebs: 7 – Felt; Asts: 1 – Tied (4)
Game 2

Legacy Arena
Birmingham, AL
Referees: Casady, Land, Seales

=== Second Round ===
ESPNU

March 12
6:00 p.m. CDT

Recap

No. 5 Charlotte 74, No. 9 Tulane 60
Scoring by half: 18–20, 56–40
Pts: 29 – Bradford; Rebs: 16 – Bonke; Asts: 11 – Mingo	Pts: 25 – Brumbaugh; Rebs: 8 – Williams Jr. Asts: 3 – Daniels
Game 3

Legacy Arena
Birmingham, AL
Referees: Casady, Nieves, Ramona

ESPNU

March 12
8:00 p.m. CDT

Recap

No. 6 North Texas 74, No. 7 Florida Atlantic 70
Scoring by half: 34–30, 40–40
Pts: 24 – Stevenson; Rebs: 8 – Hammer Jr. Asts: 7 – Terrell Jr.	Pts: 20 – Elohim; Rebs: 8 – Elohim; Asts: 3 – Moretti
Game 4

Legacy Arena
Birmingham, AL
Referees: Evans, Nance, Rorke

=== Quarterfinal Round ===
ESPN2

March 13
12:00 p.m. CDT

Recap

No. 4 UAB 78, No. 5 Charlotte 83
Scoring by half: 33–31, 45–52
Pts: 20 – Rivera; Rebs: 9 – Rivera; Asts: 15 – Westry	Pts: 35 – Mingo; Rebs: 9 – Bonke; Asts: 6 – Tied (2)
Game 5

Legacy Arena
Birmingham, AL
Referees: Jones, Nieves, Shannon

ESPN2

March 13
2:00 p.m. CDT

Recap

No. 3 Tulsa 90, No. 6 North Texas 84 (3OT)
Scoring by half: 25–36, 44–33 Overtime: 4–4, 6–6, 11–5
Pts: 26 – Riley; Rebs: 11 – Behrend; Asts: 5 – Riley	Pts: 21 – Stevenson; Rebs: 8 – Arnett; Asts: 5 – Terrell Jr.
Game 6

Legacy Arena
Birmingham, AL
Referees: Poole, Ramnanan, Rorke

=== Semifinal Round ===
In the first semifinal, South Florida defeated Charlotte 86-64 to advance to the championship game.

In the second semifinal, Wichita State defeated Tulsa 81-68 to advance to the championship game.

ESPN2

March 14
2:00 p.m. CDT

Recap

No. 1 South Florida 86, No. 5 Charlotte 64
Scoring by half: 40–33, 46–31
Pts: 24 – Enis; Rebs: 10 – Omojafo; Asts: 5 – Enis	Pts: 15 – Bonke; Rebs: 9 – Bonke; Asts: 2 – Elliott
Game 7

Legacy Arena
Birmingham, AL
Referees: Howard, Jones, Shannon

ESPN2

March 14
4:00 p.m. CDT

Recap

No. 2 Wichita State 81, No. 3 Tulsa 68
Scoring by half: 39–33, 42–35
Pts: 27 – Giles; Rebs: 14 – Berg; Asts: 6 – Gray Jr.	Pts: 18 – Riley; Rebs: 6 – Behrend; Asts: 5 – Riley
Game 8

Legacy Arena
Birmingham, AL
Referees: Adams, Shortt, Shows

=== Final Round ===
South Florida defeated Wichita State 70–55 in the championship game on March 15, 2026, at Legacy Arena in Birmingham, claiming the program's first conference tournament title in 36 years and earning an automatic bid to the 2026 NCAA tournament, and South Florida's first NCAA tournament appearance in 14 years.

ESPN

March 15
2:15 p.m. CDT

Recap

No. 1 South Florida 70, No. 2 Wichita State 55
Scoring by half: 33–26, 37–29
Pts: 19 – Enis; Rebs: 7 – Jones; Asts: 3 – Tied (2)	Pts: 15 – Battie; Rebs: 7 – Boyd; Asts: 4 – Boyd
Championship

Legacy Arena
Birmingham, AL
Referees: Adams, Shortt, Shows

== Awards and Honors ==
=== All-Tournament Team ===
Player	Team
Will Berg	Wichita State
Wes Enid ^{MVP}	South Florida
Kenyon Giles	Wichita State
Dezayne Mingo	Charlotte
Izaiyah Nelson	South Florida

MVP denotes Most Valuable Player

== See also ==
- 2026 American Conference women's basketball tournament
