= 2025–26 UTSA Roadrunners men's basketball team =

American college basketball season

2025–26 UTSA Roadrunners men's basketball
- Conference: American Conference
- Record: 5–25 (1–17 American)
- Head coach: Austin Claunch (2nd season)
- Assistant coaches: Nick Bowman; Joey Brooks; Trevor DeLoach; Joseph Jones; Robby Benavides
- Home arena: Convocation Center

2025–26 American Conference men's basketball standings
	Conf.				Overall
Team	W		L	PCT	W		L	PCT
South Florida †	15	–	3	.833	25	–	9	.735
Wichita State	13	–	5	.722	24	–	12	.667
Tulsa	13	–	5	.722	29	–	7	.806
UAB	11	–	7	.611	20	–	12	.625
Charlotte	9	–	9	.500	17	–	17	.500
North Texas	9	–	9	.500	19	–	14	.576
Florida Atlantic	9	–	9	.500	18	–	15	.545
Memphis	8	–	10	.444	13	–	19	.406
Tulane	8	–	10	.444	18	–	15	.545
Temple	8	–	10	.444	16	–	16	.500
Rice	7	–	11	.389	13	–	18	.419
East Carolina	6	–	12	.333	11	–	20	.355
UTSA	1	–	17	.056	5	–	25	.167
† 2026 American tournament winner As of March 24, 2026

The 2025–26 UTSA Roadrunners men's basketball team represented the University of Texas at San Antonio in the 2025–26 NCAA Division I men's basketball season. The Roadrunners, led by second-year head coach Austin Claunch, played their home games at Convocation Center in San Antonio, Texas as members of the American Conference.

Only the top ten conference teams qualified to participate in the 2026 American tournament. With their loss to Florida Atlantic on February 18, 2026, the Roadrunners were mathematically eliminated from making the conference tournament, and therefore eliminated from making the 2026 NCAA Division I men's basketball tournament.

== Previous season ==
The Roadrunners finished the 2024–25 season 12–19, 6–12 in conference play to finish in eleventh place in their first year in the AAC. As the 11th seed in the AAC tournament, they would play and lose in the second round to 6th seed East Carolina.

The season marked the team's second year as a member of American Athletic Conference after being in Conference USA (CUSA) from 2013 to 2023.

== Roster ==
2025–26 UTSA Roadrunners men's basketball team
Players
Coaches

Pos.	#	Name	Height	Weight	Year	Previous school	Hometown
G	0	Nazar Mahmoud	6 ft 5 in (1.96 m)	195 lb (88 kg)	So	Spring Creek Academy	Leander, TX
G	1	Primo Spears	6 ft 3 in (1.91 m)	185 lb (84 kg)	Sr	Florida State	Hartford, CT
F/C	2	Jaquan Scott	6 ft 8 in (2.03 m)	230 lb (104 kg)	Sr	Mississippi State	Dallas, TX
G	3	Tai'Reon Joseph	6 ft 3 in (1.91 m)	180 lb (82 kg)	RS Sr	Southern	Baton Rouge, LA
G	4	Marcus Millender	5 ft 11 in (1.8 m)	180 lb (82 kg)	So	South Alabama	Houston, TX
G/F	5	Raekwon Horton	6 ft 6 in (1.98 m)	215 lb (98 kg)	Sr	James Madison	Santee, SC
C	6	Mo Njie	6 ft 11 in (2.11 m)	250 lb (113 kg)	Sr	SMU	Centerville, OH
G	7	Paul Lewis	6 ft 2 in (1.88 m)	180 lb (82 kg)	Jr	Vanderbilt	Woodbridge, VA
G	12	Damari Monsanto	6 ft 6 in (1.98 m)	225 lb (102 kg)	GS	Wake Forest	Pembroke Pines, FL
G	13	LJ Brown	6 ft 1 in (1.85 m)	175 lb (79 kg)	Sr	Presentation College	San Antonio, TX
F/C	14	David Hermes	6 ft 10 in (2.08 m)	225 lb (102 kg)	Jr	Indian Hills CC	Stockholm, Sweden
F/C	15	Jonnivius Smith	6 ft 9 in (2.06 m)	200 lb (91 kg)	RS Sr	Buffalo	Selma, AL
C	17	Stanley Borden	7 ft 0 in (2.13 m)	250 lb (113 kg)	GS	Duke	Istanbul, Turkey
G/F	24	Baboucarr Njie	6 ft 5 in (1.96 m)	185 lb (84 kg)	Fr	Centerville High School	Centerville, OH
F	25	Jackson Fazande	6 ft 3 in (1.91 m)	245 lb (111 kg)	RS Fr	St. Mary's (TX)	Houston, TX
G	30	Zach Gonsoulin	6 ft 1 in (1.85 m)	175 lb (79 kg)	Jr	TCU	Houston, TX
G/F	88	Skylar Wicks	6 ft 6 in (1.98 m)	190 lb (86 kg)	RS Sr	Incarnate Word	Jersey City, NJ

Head coach

- Austin Claunch (Emory)

Assistant coach(es)

- Nick Bowman (Eastern Kentucky)
- Joey Brooks (Strake Jesuit College)
- Trevor DeLoach (UNC Wilmington)
- Joseph Jones (Texas A&M)
- Robby Benavides (St. Mary's)

Legend

- (C) Team captain
- (S) Suspended
- (I) Ineligible
- (W) Walk-on
- Injured
- Current redshirt

Roster
Last update: March 30, 2026

== Schedule and results ==
Date time, TV	Rank^{#}	Opponent^{#}	Result	Record	High points	High rebounds	High assists	Site (attendance) city, state
Exhibition
October 25, 2025*; 3:30 p.m.		Incarnate Word	L 76–87	–	14 – Moss	5 – Hayes	6 – Allette	Convocation Center (1,361); San Antonio, TX
Non-conference regular season
November 5, 2025*; 6:00 p.m., ESPN+		College of Biblical Studies	W 97–30	1–0	15 – Rich	13 – Rayfield	4 – Nunez	Convocation Center (748); San Antonio, TX
November 7, 2025*; 12:30 p.m., ESPN+		SIU Edwardsville	L 60–77	1–1	16 – Simpson	11 – B. Njie	3 – B. Njie	Convocation Center (840); San Antonio, TX
November 12, 2025*; 7:00 p.m., ESPN+		at Texas State; I-35 Rivalry	L 69–80	1–2	22 – Simpson	9 – Rayfield	2 – Nunez	Strahan Arena (2,752); San Marcos, TX
November 15, 2025*; 1:00 p.m., SLN		at Denver	W 84–79	2–2	23 – B. Njie	12 – B. Njie	5 – Hayes	Hamilton Gymnasium (1,456); Denver, CO
November 18, 2025*; 11:00 a.m., ESPN+		Southwestern Christian	W 103–70	3–2	21 – Simpson	10 – Tied	5 – Nunez	Convocation Center (558); San Antonio, TX
November 24, 2025*; 8:00 p.m., PTB Live		vs. Abilene Christian; Jacksonville Classic	L 50–61	3–3	18 – Simpson	9 – B. Njie	1 – Tied	Adams-Jenkins Community Sports Complex (562); Jacksonville, FL
November 25, 2025*; 8:00 p.m., PTB Live		vs. Georgia Southern; Jacksonville Classic	W 77–64	4–3	22 – Simpson	8 – Tied	3 – B. Njie	Adams-Jenkins Community Sports Complex (146); Jacksonville, FL
November 30, 2025*; 1:00 p.m., ESPN+		South Alabama	L 58–82	4–4	17 – Simpson	10 – Coffi	6 – Hayes	Convocation Center (960); San Antonio, TX
December 7, 2025*; 1:00 p.m., SECN+		at No. 12 Alabama	L 55–97	4–5	20 – Simpson	7 – Simpson	4 – Nunez	Coleman Coliseum (13,474); Tuscaloosa, AL
December 13, 2025*; 3:00 p.m., ESPN+		at Colorado	L 64–88	4–6	20 – Simpson	6 – Simpson	5 – Simpson	CU Events Center (5,229); Boulder, CO
December 17, 2025*; 8:00 p.m., B1G+		at USC	L 70–97	4–7	16 – Tied	7 – Akitoby	5 – Hayes	Galen Center (3,030); Los Angeles, CA
December 22, 2025*; 2:00 p.m., ESPN+		Seattle	L 68–71	4–8	25 – Rich	10 – Coffi	6 – Simpson	Convocation Center (933); San Antonio, TX
American regular season
December 31, 2025; 12:00 p.m., ESPN+		at Florida Atlantic	L 70−110	4−9 (0−1)	22 – Nunez	8 – Moss	2 – Tied	Eleanor R. Baldwin Arena (3,161); Boca Raton, FL
January 3, 2026; 11:00 a.m., ESPNU		at Temple	L 57–76	4–10 (0–2)	12 – Nunez	9 – Moss	4 – Hayes	Liacouras Center (4,011); Philadelphia, PA
January 7, 2026; 7:00 p.m., ESPN+		Charlotte	L 58–74	4–11 (0–3)	16 – Nunez	7 – Rayfield	3 – Nunez	Convocation Center (623); San Antonio, TX
January 10, 2026; 4:00 p.m., ESPN+		Tulane	L 52–85	4–12 (0–4)	12 – Nunez	11 – Coffi	2 – Tied	Convocation Center (907); San Antonio, TX
January 14, 2026; 7:00 p.m., ESPN+		Rice	L 73–89	4–13 (0–5)	23 – B. Nije	9 – B. Nije	3 – B. Nije	Convocation Center (695); San Antonio, TX
January 18, 2026; 3:00 p.m., ESPNU		at Memphis	L 69–95	4–14 (0–6)	17 – Hayes	6 – B. Nije	6 – B. Nije	FedExForum (9,877); Memphis, TN
January 21, 2026; 7:00 p.m., ESPN+		at North Texas	L 62–81	4–15 (0–7)	14 – Simpson	4 – Tied	Tied – -	The Super Pit (3,104); Denton, TX
January 24, 2026; 1:00 p.m., ESPN+		Temple	L 64–70	4–16 (0–8)	25 – B. Nije	12 – Moss	3 – Nunez	Convocation Center (1,027); San Antonio, TX
January 28, 2026; 6:00 p.m., ESPN+		UAB	L 73–83	4–17 (0–9)	19 – Moss	7 – Tied	3 – Nunez	Convocation Center (1,024); San Antonio, TX
February 4, 2026; 6:00 p.m., ESPN+		at South Florida	L 88–109	4–18 (0–10)	32 – Moss	8 – Akitoby	6 – Nunez	Yuengling Center (3,371); Tampa, FL
February 7, 2026; 1:00 p.m., ESPN+		North Texas	L 58–81	4–19 (0–11)	17 – Sampson	6 – Brown	7 – Nunez	Convocation Center (1,189); San Antonio, TX
February 11, 2026; 6:00 p.m., ESPN+		at East Carolina	L 72−88	4−20 (0−12)	16 – Akitoby	11 – Akitoby	5 – Rayfield	Williams Arena (3,008); Greenville, NC
February 15, 2026; 11:00 a.m., ESPNU		at Charlotte	W 88−79	5−20 (1−12)	20 – Simpson	8 – Simpson	12 – Simpson	Dale F. Halton Arena (2,347); Charlotte, NC
February 18, 2026; 7:00 p.m., ESPN+		Florida Atlantic	L 52–60	5−21 (1−13)	21 – B. Njie	10 – Rayfield	4 – Simpson	Convocation Center (1,058); San Antonio, TX
February 22, 2026; 3:00 p.m., ESPNEWS		at Tulsa	L 74–100	5−22 (1−14)	20 – Simpson	5 – Simpson	3 – Tied	Reynolds Center (3,618); Tulsa, OK
February 25, 2026; 7:00 p.m., ESPN+		East Carolina	L 81–82	5–23 (1–15)	22 – Simpson	9 – Akitoby	10 – Simpson	Convocation Center (1,037); San Antonio, TX
March 1, 2026; 4:00 p.m., ESPN+		Wichita State	L 67–84	5–24 (1–16)	21 – Tied	13 – Akitoby	1 – Tied	Convocation Center (1,025); San Antonio, TX
March 8, 2026; 2:00 p.m., ESPN+		at Rice	L 71–80	5–25 (1–17)	16 – Tied	14 – Coffi	2 – Tied	Tudor Fieldhouse (1,299); Houston, TX
*Non-conference game. ^{#}Rankings from AP poll. (#) Tournament seedings in parentheses. All times are in Central.

== See also ==
- 2025–26 UTSA Roadrunners women's basketball team
