= 2025–26 Rice Owls men's basketball team =

American college basketball season

2025–26 Rice Owls men's basketball
- Conference: American Conference
- Record: 13–18 (7–11 American)
- Head coach: Rob Lanier (2nd season)
- Associate head coach: Chris Kreider (4th season)
- Assistant coaches: Josten Crow (2nd season); Andre Owens (2nd season); Jordan Glover (2nd season)
- Home arena: Tudor Fieldhouse (capacity: 5,750); Houston, Texas

2025–26 American Conference men's basketball standings
	Conf.				Overall
Team	W		L	PCT	W		L	PCT
South Florida	15	–	3	.833	23	–	8	.742
Wichita State	13	–	5	.722	21	–	10	.677
Tulsa	13	–	5	.722	25	–	6	.806
UAB	11	–	7	.611	20	–	11	.645
North Texas	9	–	9	.500	18	–	13	.581
Florida Atlantic	9	–	9	.500	17	–	14	.548
Charlotte	9	–	9	.500	15	–	16	.484
Tulane	8	–	10	.444	17	–	14	.548
Temple	8	–	10	.444	16	–	15	.516
Memphis	8	–	10	.444	13	–	18	.419
Rice	7	–	11	.389	13	–	18	.419
East Carolina	6	–	12	.333	11	–	20	.355
UTSA	1	–	17	.056	5	–	25	.167
† 2026 American tournament winner As of March 8, 2026

The 2025–26 Rice Owls men's basketball team represented Rice University during the 2025–26 NCAA Division I men's basketball season. The team, led by second-year head coach Rob Lanier, played their home games at Tudor Fieldhouse in Houston, Texas as third-year members of the American Conference.

== Previous season ==
The Owls finished the 2024–25 season 13–19, 4–14 in American Athletic Conference (AAC) play to finish in 12th place. As the no. 12 seed in the AAC tournament, they lost in the first round to Charlotte.

== Offseason ==
Kellen Amos, Emory Lanier, Alem Huseinovic and Jackson Peakes graduated. Caden Powell transferred to Baylor on April 14. Denver Anglin transferred to Iona on May 5. Ifeanyi Ufochukwu transferred to Duke on May 7. Jacob Dar transferred to Seton Hall on May 10. Powell was the Owls' leading rebounder and shot blocker and second leading scorer, shooting 57% from the floor. Anglin shot three-pointers at 38% and was the team's leading free-throw shooter at 81%. Dar averaged 7.5 points in 20 minutes per game the previous season. Ufochukwu did not appear in a game for the Owls during 2024–25.

Cam Carroll, a 6' 2" guard from Grand Prairie, Texas, was the first freshman recruit to commit to Rice on September 4, 2024. Carroll had 13 other Division I offers, including from SMU and Mississippi State. Carroll was named most valuable player in his district as a senior at South Grand Prairie. He scored over 1,000 points in his high school career.

Bodey Howell, a 6' 4" guard from Meridian, Idaho, committed to Rice on September 10, 2024. Howell was named the Idaho player of the year by Gatorade and MaxPreps, after averaging 18.1 points, 4.0 rebounds and 2.9 steals per game as a senior at Owyhee. He was tournament most valuable player, leading his team to the Class 6A state championship.

Evan Cochran, a 6' 9" forward from Houston, committed to Rice on September 10, 2024. Cochran had 10 other Division I offers. As a senior at The Village School, Cochran was first-team all-district and names All-Greater Houston by the Houston Chronicle. He scored over 2,500 points in his high school career. Cochran was named Class 6A academic all-state with a 4.0 grade point average.

Eternity Eguagie, a 6' 6" forward from Edmonton, Alberta, Canada, committed to transfer to Rice from Colby Community College as a sophomore on March 22. Eguagie averaged 18.3 points, 6.5 rebounds and 32 minutes in 31 games, all starts, as a freshman with the Trojans.

Nick Anderson, a 6' 3" swingman from Houston, committed to transfer to Rice from Prairie View A&M as a senior on April 19. Anderson averaged 18.9 points and 5.3 rebounds 12 games, all starts, as a junior with the Panthers, before suffering a season-ending injury.

Dallas Hobbs, a 6' 1" guard from Dallas, committed to transfer to Rice from Mount St. Mary's as a junior on April 22. Hobbs averaged 12.4 points, 3.7 rebounds and 3.3 assists in 30 games, 26 starts, as a sophomore with the Mountaineers. He was named to the 2025 MAAC all-tournament team.

Jordan Williams, a 6' 2" guard from Houston, transferred to Rice from Vanderbilt as a redshirt junior on June 3. Williams averaged 1.2 points and 3.7 minutes in 10 games as a redshirt sophomore with the Commodores.

Stephen Giwa, a 6' 9" center from Houston, transferred to Rice from Texas A&M–Corpus Christi as a redshirt senior on June 3. Giwa averaged 5.9 points, 5.1 rebounds and 21 minutes in 27 games, 23 starts, as a redshirt junior with the Islanders.

Presley Patterson, a 5' 11" guard from Knoxville, Tennessee, transferred to Rice from Auburn as a walk-on senior on June 7. Patterson appeared in 11 games as a junior for the Tigers and scored seven points in 1.3 minutes per game.

In May, Owls assistant coach Nelson Terroba left to become an assistant at Division II St. Edward's.

=== Departures ===
Rice departures
Name	No.	Pos.	Height	Weight	2024‍–‍25 class	Hometown	Reason for departure
Ifeanyi Ufchukwu	0	C	6' 11"	240	Junior	Benin City, Nigeria	Transferred to Duke
Kellen Amos	1	G/F	6' 7"	190	Graduate student	Houston, TX	Graduated; undrafted in 2025 NBA draft
Emory Lanier	2	G	6' 4"	190	Graduate student	Atlanta, GA	Graduated; undrafted in 2025 NBA draft
Denver Anglin	4	G	6' 1"	185	Junior	Montclair, NJ	Transferred to Iona
Jacob Dar	5	G/F	6' 7"	170	Junior	Omaha, NE	Transferred to Seton Hall
Jackson Peakes	22	G	6' 4"	185	(redshirt) Junior	Houston, TX	Graduated; undrafted in 2025 NBA draft
Alem Huseinovic	23	G	6' 4"	185	Graduate student	Zenica, Bosnia and Herzegovina	Graduated; undrafted in 2025 NBA draft
Caden Powell	44	F	6' 10"	220	Junior	Waco, TX	Transferred to Baylor

=== Incoming transfers ===
Rice incoming transfers
Name	No.	Pos.	Height	Weight	2025–26 class	Hometown	Previous school	Years rem.	Comm. date
Dallas Hobbs	0	G	6' 1"	175	Junior	Dallas, TX	Mount St. Mary's	2	Apr 22, 2025
Jordan Williams	5	G	6' 2"	215	(redshirt) Junior	Houston, TX	Vanderbilt	2	Jun 3, 2025
Eternity Eguagie	8	F	6' 6"	220	Sophomore	Edmonton, Alberta, Canada	Colby CC	3	Mar 22, 2025
Presely Patterson	14	G	5' 11"	180	Senior	Knoxville, TN	Auburn	1	Jun 7, 2025
Nick Anderson	23	G/F	6' 3"	195	Senior	Houston, TX	Prairie View A&M	1	Apr 19, 2025
Stephen Giwa	32	C	6' 9"	245	(redshirt) Senior	Houston, TX	Texas A&M–Corpus Christi	1	Jun 3, 2025

=== Recruiting classes ===
==== 2025 recruiting class ====
College recruiting information
Name	Hometown	School	Height	Weight	Commit date
Cam Carroll; PG	Grand Prairie, TX	South Grand Prairie	6 ft 2 in (1.88 m)	170 lb (77 kg)	Sep 4, 2024
Cam Carroll; PG	Recruit ratings: Rivals: 247Sports: ESPN: (79)				
Bodey Howell; SG	Meridian, ID	Owyhee	6 ft 4 in (1.93 m)	180 lb (82 kg)	Sep 10, 2024
Bodey Howell; SG	Recruit ratings: Rivals: 247Sports: ESPN: (NR)				
Evan Cochran; PF	Houston, TX	The Village School	6 ft 8 in (2.03 m)	210 lb (95 kg)	Sep 10, 2024
Evan Cochran; PF	Recruit ratings: Rivals: 247Sports: ESPN: (NR)				
Overall recruit ranking:
Note: In many cases, Scout, Rivals, 247Sports, On3, and ESPN may conflict in their listings of height and weight.; In these cases, the average was taken. ESPN grades are on a 100-point scale.; Sources: "2025 Team Ranking". Rivals.

==== 2026 recruiting class ====
College recruiting information (2026)
Name	Hometown	School	Height	Weight	Commit date
Jaxson Thompson; PG	Addison, TX	Greenhill School	6 ft 2 in (1.88 m)	165 lb (75 kg)	Aug 31, 2025
Jaxson Thompson; PG	Recruit ratings: Rivals: 247Sports: ESPN: (NR)				
Alexander Leeth; PF	Meridian, ID	Owyhee	6 ft 7 in (2.01 m)	195 lb (88 kg)	Aug 31, 2025
Alexander Leeth; PF	Recruit ratings: Rivals: 247Sports: ESPN: (NR)				
Overall recruit ranking:
Note: In many cases, Scout, Rivals, 247Sports, On3, and ESPN may conflict in their listings of height and weight.; In these cases, the average was taken. ESPN grades are on a 100-point scale.; Sources: "2026 Team Ranking". Rivals.

== Roster ==
2024–25 Rice Owls men's basketball team
Players
Coaches

Pos.	#	Name	Height	Weight	Year	Previous school	Hometown
G	0	Dallas Hobbs	6 ft 1 in (1.85 m)	175 lb (79 kg)	Jr	Dynamic Preparatory; Mount St. Mary's	Dallas, TX
G	1	Cam Carroll	6 ft 2 in (1.88 m)	175 lb (79 kg)	Fr	South Grand Prairie HS	Grand Prairie, TX
G	2	Jalen Smith	6 ft 4 in (1.93 m)	195 lb (88 kg)	RS Sr	Oak Ridge HS; SMU	Orlando, FL
F	3	Trey Patterson	6 ft 9 in (2.06 m)	225 lb (102 kg)	GS	Rutgers Prep; Rutgers	Somerset, NJ
G	5	Jordan Williams	6 ft 2 in (1.88 m)	215 lb (98 kg)	RS Jr	Second Baptist School; Vanderbilt	Houston, TX
G	7	Bodey Howell	6 ft 4 in (1.93 m)	180 lb (82 kg)	Fr	Owyhee HS	Meridian, ID
F	8	Eternity Eguagie	6 ft 6 in (1.98 m)	220 lb (100 kg)	So	J. Addison School; Colby CC	Edmonton, Alberta, Canada
G	10	Cole Andrews-Heitz (W)	6 ft 1 in (1.85 m)	170 lb (77 kg)	Jr	Rouse HS	Leander, TX
G	11	Aaron Powell	6 ft 1 in (1.85 m)	185 lb (84 kg)	So	Campbell Hall HS	Los Angeles, CA
G	12	Trae Broadnax	6 ft 4 in (1.93 m)	200 lb (91 kg)	GS	Montverde Academy; USC	Savannah, GA
F	13	Andrew Akuchie	6 ft 11 in (2.11 m)	215 lb (98 kg)	Sr	St. Thomas Aquinas HS	Fort Lauderdale, FL
G	14	Presley Patterson (W)	5 ft 11 in (1.8 m)	180 lb (82 kg)	Sr	Knoxville Catholic HS; Auburn	Knoxville, TN
F	21	Evan Cochran	6 ft 9 in (2.06 m)	210 lb (95 kg)	Fr	The Village School	Houston, TX
G/F	23	Nick Anderson	6 ft 3 in (1.91 m)	195 lb (88 kg)	Sr	Clear Creek HS; Prairie View A&M	Houston, TX
F	24	Jimmy Oladokun Jr.	6 ft 9 in (2.06 m)	220 lb (100 kg)	Jr	Sierra Canyon HS; San Diego	Los Angeles, CA
F	30	George Perkins (W)	6 ft 8 in (2.03 m)	200 lb (91 kg)	RS Jr	Sidwell Friends School	Washington, DC
C	32	Stephen Giwa	6 ft 9 in (2.06 m)	245 lb (111 kg)	RS Sr	Fort Bend Bush HS; Texas A&M–Corpus Christi	Houston, TX

Head coach

- Rob Lanier (St. Bonaventure)

Assistant coach(es)

- Chris Kreider (Lebanon Valley)
- Josten Crow (Sam Houston State)
- Andre Owens (Texas–San Antonio)
- Jordan Glover (Buffalo State)

Legend

- (C) Team captain
- (S) Suspended
- (I) Ineligible
- (W) Walk-on
- Injured
- Current redshirt

Roster
Last update: October 30, 2025

== Schedule and results ==
Date time, TV	Rank^{#}	Opponent^{#}	Result	Record	High points	High rebounds	High assists	Site (attendance) city, state
Non-conference regular season
November 4, 2025*; 7:00 p.m., ESPN+		College of Biblical Studies	W 109–38	1–0	18 – Smith	12 – Giwa	9 – Carroll	Tudor Fieldhouse (989); Houston, TX
November 7, 2025*; 9:00 p.m., B1G+		at Oregon	L 63–67	1–1	17 – Broadnax	9 – Giwa	5 – Smith	Matthew Knight Arena (5,619); Eugene, OR
November 11, 2025*; 7:00 p.m., ESPN+		Stephen F. Austin	L 69–81	1–2	21 – Broadnax	11 – Oladokun Jr.	4 – Hobbs	Tudor Fieldhouse (1,293); Houston, TX
November 14, 2025*; 7:00 p.m., ESPN+		East Texas A&M	W 71–64	2–2	18 – Smith	7 – Broadnax	4 – Hobbs	Tudor Fieldhouse (1,117); Houston, TX
November 17, 2025*; 7:30 p.m., SECN		at No. 20 Tennessee	L 66–91	2–3	19 – Patterson	4 – Tied	3 – Carroll	Thompson-Boling Arena (17,283); Knoxville, TN
November 20, 2025*; 7:00 p.m., ESPN+		Tarleton State	L 74–90	2–4	18 – Anderson	9 – Akuchie	6 – Broadnax	Tudor Fieldhouse (1,099); Houston, TX
November 24, 2025*; 3:30 p.m., FloHoops		vs. Kennesaw State; Coconut Hoops Tarpon Bay Division	L 84–89 ^{OT}	2–5	18 – Anderson	6 – Anderson	4 – Carroll	Alico Arena (555); Fort Myers, FL
November 25, 2025*; 6:00 p.m., FloHoops		at Florida Gulf Coast; Coconut Hoops Tarpon Bay Division	L 63–78 ^{OT}	2–6	12 – Broadnax	7 – Tied	3 – Tied	Alico Arena (984); Fort Myers, FL
November 26, 2025*; 3:30 p.m., FloHoops		vs. Oral Roberts; Coconut Hoops Tarpon Bay Division	W 81–62	3–6	22 – Anderson	10 – Smith	3 – Smith	Alico Arena (117); Fort Myers, FL
December 3, 2025*; 8:00 p.m., ESPN+		Texas State	W 77–72	4–6	16 – Broadnax	7 – Broadnax	6 – Broadnax	Tudor Fieldhouse (1,055); Houston, TX
December 13, 2025*; 2:00 p.m., ESPN+		Arkansas State	W 77–76	5–6	14 – Anderson	6 – Tied	6 – Smith	Tudor Fieldhouse (1,125); Houston, TX
December 17, 2025*; 11:15 a.m., ESPN+		Southwestern Christian	W 94–47	6–6	19 – Smith	8 – Oladokun Jr.	6 – Howell	Tudor Fieldhouse (1,199); Houston, TX
December 20, 2025*; 8:00 p.m., ESPN+		at Pepperdine	L 62–84	6–7	19 – Broadnax	8 – Broadnax	4 – Smith	Firestone Fieldhouse (566); Malibu, CA
American regular season
December 31, 2025; 1:00 pm, ESPNU		at Tulsa	L 48–97	6–8 (0–1)	17 – Anderson	5 – Broadnax	2 – Hobbs	Reynolds Center (3,306); Tulsa, OK
January 3, 2026; 2:00 pm, ESPN+		Memphis	L 70–76	6–9 (0–2)	17 – Anderson	9 – Giwa	3 – Hobbs	Tudor Fieldhouse (2,038); Houston, TX
January 7, 2026; 6:30 pm, ESPN+		at Wichita State	W 66–64	7–9 (1–2)	22 – Broadnax	7 – Williams	2 – Carroll	Charles Koch Arena (5,111); Wichita, KS
January 11, 2026; 1:00 pm, ESPN+		Charlotte	L 73–74	7–10 (1–3)	23 – Anderson	7 – Giwa	7 – Broadnax	Tudor Fieldhouse (1,245); Houston, TX
January 14, 2026; 7:00 pm, ESPN+		at UTSA	W 89–73	8–10 (2–3)	20 – Broadnax	7 – Giwa	7 – Broadnax	Convocation Center (695); San Antonio, TX
January 21, 2026; 7:00 pm, ESPN+		Temple	L 65–69	8–11 (2–4)	17 – Broadnax	6 – Giwa	5 – Carroll	Tudor Fieldhouse (1,183); Houston, TX
January 24, 2026; 3:30 pm, ESPN+		Tulsa	L 81–87	8–12 (2–5)	24 – Smith	8 – Oladokun Jr.	4 – Broadnax	Tudor Fieldhouse (1,254); Houston, TX
January 28, 2026; 6:00 pm, ESPNU		at East Carolina	W 83–77	9–12 (3–5)	21 – Smith	10 – Broadnax	5 – Carroll	Minges Coliseum (4,107); Greenville, NC
January 30, 2026; 6:00 pm, ESPN+		at Charlotte	L 70–80	9–13 (3–6)	18 – Anderson	9 – Giwa	5 – Broadnax	Dale F. Halton Arena (2,408); Charlotte, NC
February 4, 2026; 7:00 pm, ESPN+		North Texas	W 86–83 ^{2OT}	10–13 (4–6)	22 – Tied	11 – Broadnax	5 – Broadnax	Tudor Fieldhouse (1,314); Houston, TX
February 8, 2026; 2:00 pm, ESPN+		at UAB	L 65–71	10–14 (4–7)	15 – Broadnax	12 – Oladokun Jr.	3 – Tied	Bartow Arena (3,418); Birmingham, AL
February 11, 2026; 7:00 pm, ESPN+		Florida Atlantic	W 81–73	11–14 (5–7)	23 – Anderson	6 – Tied	5 – Broadnax	Tudor Fieldhouse (999); Houston, TX
February 14, 2026; 1:00 pm, ESPN+		East Carolina	L 75–85	11–15 (5–8)	27 – Broadnax	8 – Akuchie	5 – Smith	Tudor Fieldhouse (1,789); Houston, TX
February 22, 2026; 1:00 pm, ESPN+		at Tulane	L 75–81	11–16 (5–9)	29 – Anderson	7 – Anderson	6 – Broadnax	Devlin Fieldhouse (1,957); New Orleans, LA
February 25, 2026; 7:00 pm, ESPN+		South Florida	L 56–75	11–17 (5–10)	13 – Carroll	6 – Carroll	3 – Eguagie	Tudor Fieldhouse (1,222); Houston, TX
March 1, 2026; 1:00 pm, ESPN+		at Temple	W 80–74	12–17 (6–10)	21 – Anderson	6 – Tied	4 – Tied	Liacouras Center (2,684); Philadelphia, PA
March 4, 2026; 7:00 pm, ESPN+		at North Texas	L 58–62	12–18 (6–11)	18 – Smith	8 – Tied	3 – Tied	The Super Pit (2,775); Denton, TX
March 8, 2026; 2:00 pm, ESPN+		UTSA	W 80–71	13–18 (7–11)	25 – Smith	10 – Giwa	5 – Broadnax	Tudor Fieldhouse (1,299); Houston, TX
*Non-conference game. ^{#}Rankings from AP Poll. (#) Tournament seedings in parentheses. All times are in Central.

== See also ==
- 2025–26 Rice Owls women's basketball team
