= 2025–26 Florida Atlantic Owls men's basketball team =

American college basketball season

2025–26 Florida Atlantic Owls men's basketball
- Conference: American Conference
- Record: 18–15 (9–9 American)
- Head coach: John Jakus (2nd season)
- Assistant coaches: Aditya Malhotra; Todd Abernethy; Jordan Fee; Isaiah Austin
- Home arena: Eleanor R. Baldwin Arena

2025–26 American Conference men's basketball standings
	Conf.				Overall
Team	W		L	PCT	W		L	PCT
South Florida †	15	–	3	.833	25	–	9	.735
Wichita State	13	–	5	.722	24	–	11	.686
Tulsa	13	–	5	.722	28	–	7	.800
UAB	11	–	7	.611	20	–	12	.625
Charlotte	9	–	9	.500	17	–	17	.500
North Texas	9	–	9	.500	19	–	14	.576
Florida Atlantic	9	–	9	.500	18	–	15	.545
Memphis	8	–	10	.444	13	–	19	.406
Tulane	8	–	10	.444	18	–	15	.545
Temple	8	–	10	.444	16	–	16	.500
Rice	7	–	11	.389	13	–	18	.419
East Carolina	6	–	12	.333	11	–	20	.355
UTSA	1	–	17	.056	5	–	25	.167
† 2026 American tournament winner As of March 22, 2026

The 2025–26 Florida Atlantic Owls men's basketball team represented Florida Atlantic University in the 2025–26 NCAA Division I men's basketball season. The Owls, led by second-year head coach John Jakus, played their home games at Eleanor R. Baldwin Arena located in Boca Raton, Florida as a member of the American Conference.

== Previous season ==
The Owls finished the 2024–25 season 18–16, 10–8 in AAC play to finish in fifth place. They beat Charlotte in the second round of the AAC tournament before losing to Tulane in the quarterfinals. They were invited to the 2025 NIT, where they lost to Dayton in the first round.

== Roster ==
2025–26 Florida Atlantic Owls men's basketball team
Players
Coaches

Pos.	#	Name	Height	Weight	Year	Previous school	Hometown
F	1	Devin Williams	6 ft 10 in (2.08 m)	210 lb (95 kg)	RS So	Centennial HS; UCLA	Riverside, CA
G	2	Isaiah Elohim	6 ft 5 in (1.96 m)	215 lb (98 kg)	So	Sierra Canyon; USC	Kingston, NY
G	3	Amar Amkou	6 ft 7 in (2.01 m)	215 lb (98 kg)	RS Fr	CSI Keur Madior	Thiès, Senegal
G	4	Liam Dayco-Green	6 ft 2 in (1.88 m)	185 lb (84 kg)	RS Fr	Prolific Prep	Vancouver, BC
G	5	Yohann Sissoko	6 ft 5 in (1.96 m)	205 lb (93 kg)	Fr	Lycee General et technologique Acadomia	Paris, France
G	7	Zion Sampaio	6 ft 6 in (1.98 m)	185 lb (84 kg)	Fr	St. Andrew's School	Ft. Lauderdale, FL
C	8	Vincent Neugebauer	7 ft 1 in (2.16 m)	241 lb (109 kg)	Jr	Oldenburg, Germany
G	9	Max Langenfeld	6 ft 6 in (1.98 m)	195 lb (88 kg)	RS Fr	Urspringschule	Ulm, Germany
G	11	Josiah Parker	6 ft 7 in (2.01 m)	225 lb (102 kg)	Fr	Combine Academy Int'l	Huber Heights, OH
F	17	Xander Pintelon	6 ft 11 in (2.11 m)	220 lb (100 kg)	Jr	Oostkamp, Belgium
G	18	Kanaan Carlyle	6 ft 3 in (1.91 m)	182 lb (83 kg)	Jr	Overtime Elite; Indiana	Atlanta, GA
G	22	Devin Vanterpool	6 ft 4 in (1.93 m)	190 lb (86 kg)	So	Christ the King Regional HS	Laurel, MD
G	25	Niccolo Moretti	6 ft 1 in (1.85 m)	180 lb (82 kg)	Jr	Illinois	Bologna, Italy
G	30	Lachlan Smith	6 ft 3 in (1.91 m)	170 lb (77 kg)	Fr	IMG Academy	Manhattan, NY
F	77	Maxim Logue	6 ft 9 in (2.06 m)	232 lb (105 kg)	So	Oregon State	Lyon, France

Head coach

- John Jakus (Trinity International)

Assistant coach(es)

- Isaiah Austin (Baylor)
- Jordan Fee (West Liberty)
- Aditya Malhotra (Baylor)
- Demond Parker (Cedarville)
- Aaron Smith (Prairie View A&M)

Legend

- (C) Team captain
- (S) Suspended
- (I) Ineligible
- (W) Walk-on
- Injured
- Current redshirt

Roster
Last update: November 15, 2025

== Schedule and results ==
Date time, TV	Rank^{#}	Opponent^{#}	Result	Record	High points	High rebounds	High assists	Site (attendance) city, state
Non-conference regular season
November 7, 2025*; 7:00 p.m., ESPNU		Boston College	W 83–78 ^{OT}	1–0	19 – Carlyle	8 – Tied	6 – Vanterpool	Eleanor R. Baldwin Arena (3,161); Boca Raton, FL
November 8, 2025*; 6:00 p.m., YouTube		vs. Charleston; Field of 68 Tip-Off	W 94–77	2–0	14 – Carlyle	7 – Williams	5 – Vanterpool	Liberty Arena (303); Lynchburg, VA
November 9, 2025*; 6:00 p.m., YouTube		at Liberty	L 68–88	2–1	24 – Vanterpool	5 – Tied	2 – Tied	Liberty Arena (3,722); Lynchburg, VA
November 17, 2025*; 7:00 p.m., ESPN+		Coastal Georgia	W 92–63	3–1	30 – Vanterpool	8 – Vanterpool	6 – Carlyle	Eleanor R. Baldwin Arena (3,161); Boca Raton, FL
November 20, 2025*; 7:00 p.m., ESPN+		Pacific; Sunshine Slam campus game	W 82–59	4–1	21 – Carlyle	5 – Vanterpool	5 – Moretti	Eleanor R. Baldwin Arena (3,161); Boca Raton, FL
November 24, 2025*; 8:30 p.m., CBSSN		vs. Loyola Marymount; Sunshine Slam Beach Bracket semifinal	W 76–65	5–1	24 – Carlyle	9 – Pintelon	5 – Carlyle	Ocean Center (1,236); Daytona Beach, FL
November 25, 2025*; 7:30 p.m., CBSSN		vs. George Mason; Sunshine Slam Beach Bracket championship	L 65–74	5–2	22 – Carlyle	9 – Vanterpool	5 – Vanterpool	Ocean Center (1,078); Daytona Beach, FL
November 30, 2025*; 3:30 p.m., ESPN2		St. Bonaventure	L 65–70	5–3	17 – Vanterpool	10 – Vanterpool	5 – Carlyle	Eleanor R. Baldwin Arena (3,161); Boca Raton, FL
December 7, 2025*; 2:00 p.m., ESPN+		at Florida Gulf Coast	W 81–76	6–3	24 – Vanterpool	8 – Vanterpool	2 – Tied	Alico Arena (2,574); Fort Myers, FL
December 10, 2025*; 7:00 p.m., ESPN+		Saint Leo	W 112–55	7–3	20 – Sissoko	10 – Amkou	7 – Moretti	Eleanor R. Baldwin Arena (3,161); Boca Raton, FL
December 13, 2025*; 12:00 p.m., ESPN+		Albany	W 105–79	8–3	24 – Vanterpool	8 – Williams	6 – Moretti	Eleanor R. Baldwin Arena (3,161); Boca Raton, FL
December 19, 2025*; 10:00 p.m., ESPN+		at Saint Mary's	L 75–88	8–4	17 – Parker	8 – Logue	3 – Tied	University Credit Union Pavilion (3,129); Moraga, CA
December 23, 2025*; 2:00 p.m.		vs. UCF	L 80–85	8–5	20 – Pintelon	11 – Carlyle	4 – Carlyle	ESPN Wide World of Sports Complex (1,057); Lake Buena Vista, FL
American regular season
December 31, 2025; 1:00 p.m., ESPN+		UTSA	W 110–70	9–5 (1−0)	21 – Vanterpool	6 – Tied	8 – Moretti	Eleanor R. Baldwin Arena (3,161); Boca Raton, FL
January 4, 2026; 1:00 p.m., ESPN2		at Tulane	L 66–69	9–6 (1–1)	13 – Elohim	9 – Elohim	4 – Carlyle	Devlin Fieldhouse (1,071); New Orleans, LA
January 7, 2025; 7:30 p.m., ESPN+		at UAB	W 76–71	10–6 (2–1)	25 – Carlyle	8 – Tied	3 – Tied	Bartow Arena (3,152); Birmingham, AL
January 11, 2026; 1:00 p.m., ESPN2		Memphis	W 89–78	11–6 (3–1)	17 – Carlyle	11 – Vanterpool	7 – Vanterpool	Eleanor R. Baldwin Arena (3,161); Boca Raton, FL
January 15, 2025; 9:00 p.m., ESPN2		Wichita State	W 85–67	12–6 (4–1)	18 – Tied	10 – Williams	8 – Moretti	Eleanor R. Baldwin Arena (3,161); Boca Raton, FL
January 18, 2026; 12:00 p.m., ESPNU		at Temple	W 79–73	13–6 (5–1)	22 – Parker	12 – Parker	4 – Carlyle	Liacouras Center (2.588); Philadelphia, PA
January 21, 2026; 7:00 p.m., ESPN+		Tulane	W 79–74	14–6 (6–1)	20 – Vanterpool	7 – Vanterpool	6 – Pintelon	Eleanor R. Baldwin Arena (3,161); Boca Raton, FL
January 25, 2026; 1:00 p.m., ESPN2		at South Florida	L 75–89	14–7 (6–2)	22 – Vanterpool	6 – Elohim	4 – Carlyle	Yuengling Center (4,833); Tampa, FL
January 29, 2026; 8:00 p.m., ESPN2		at Memphis	L 65–92	14–8 (6–3)	21 – Parker	14 – Parker	2 – Tied	FedExForum (5,074); Memphis, TN
February 1, 2026; 2:00 p.m., ESPN+		East Carolina	L 75–76	14–9 (6–4)	20 – Elohim	9 – Williams	4 – Tied	Eleanor R. Baldwin Arena (3,161); Boca Raton, FL
February 4, 2026; 7:00 p.m., ESPN+		Tulsa	L 76–78	14–10 (6–5)	25 – Moretti	12 – Parker	5 – Moretti	Eleanor R. Baldwin Arena (3,161); Boca Raton, FL
February 11, 2026; 8:00 p.m., ESPN+		at Rice	L 73–81	14–11 (6–6)	25 – Parker	10 – Parker	4 – Moretti	Tudor Fieldhouse (999); Houston, TX
February 15, 2026; 2:00 p.m., ESPN2		South Florida	L 81–83 ^{OT}	14–12 (6–7)	26 – Vanterpool	10 – Parker	5 – Moretti	Eleanor R. Baldwin Arena (3,161); Boca Raton, FL
February 18, 2026; 8:00 p.m., ESPN+		at UTSA	W 60–52	15–12 (7–7)	16 – Parker	13 – Parker	5 – Carlyle	Convocation Center (1,058); San Antonio, TX
February 22, 2026; 4:00 p.m., ESPNU		at North Texas	L 72–73	15–13 (7–8)	18 – Parker	9 – Parker	9 – Moretti	The Super Pit (3,237); Denton, TX
February 26, 2026; 7:00 p.m., ESPN2		Temple	W 77–73	16–13 (8–8)	22 – Carlyle	11 – Parker	5 – Moretti	Eleanor R. Baldwin Arena (3,161); Boca Raton, FL
March 1, 2026; 2:00 p.m., ESPN+		Charlotte	W 77–76 ^{OT}	17–13 (9–8)	19 – Carlyle	10 – Logue	4 – Carlyle	Eleanor R. Baldwin Arena (3,161); Boca Raton, FL
March 7, 2026; 4:00 p.m., ESPNU		at Wichita State	L 70–88	17–14 (9–9)	26 – Carlyle	7 – Parker	6 – Moretti	Charles Koch Arena (8,163); Wichita, KS
American tournament
March 11, 2026; 9:00 p.m., ESPN+	(7)	vs. (10) Temple; First round	W 63–59	18–14	19 – Moretti	6 – Tied	3 – Moretti	Legacy Arena; Birmingham, AL
March 12, 2026; 9:30 p.m., ESPNU	(7)	vs. (6) North Texas; Second round	L 70–74	18–15	20 – Elohim	8 – Elohim	3 – Moretti	Legacy Arena; Birmingham, AL
*Non-conference game. ^{#}Rankings from AP poll. (#) Tournament seedings in parentheses. All times are in Eastern.
