= 2025–26 Charlotte 49ers men's basketball team =

American college basketball season

2025–26 Charlotte 49ers men's basketball
- Conference: American Conference
- Record: 17–17 (9–9 American)
- Head coach: Aaron Fearne (3rd season)
- Assistant coaches: Trevor DeLoach; Ben Johnson; Brett Carey; Michael Wilmot; Daniel Blaze
- Home arena: Dale F. Halton Arena

2025–26 American Conference men's basketball standings
| | Conf. | | | | Overall |
| Team | W | | L | PCT | W | | L | PCT |
|---|---|---|---|---|---|---|---|---|
| South Florida † | 15 | – | 3 | .833 | 25 | – | 9 | .735 |
| Wichita State | 13 | – | 5 | .722 | 24 | – | 12 | .667 |
| Tulsa | 13 | – | 5 | .722 | 30 | – | 8 | .789 |
| UAB | 11 | – | 7 | .611 | 20 | – | 12 | .625 |
| Charlotte | 9 | – | 9 | .500 | 17 | – | 17 | .500 |
| North Texas | 9 | – | 9 | .500 | 19 | – | 14 | .576 |
| Florida Atlantic | 9 | – | 9 | .500 | 18 | – | 15 | .545 |
| Memphis | 8 | – | 10 | .444 | 13 | – | 19 | .406 |
| Tulane | 8 | – | 10 | .444 | 18 | – | 15 | .545 |
| Temple | 8 | – | 10 | .444 | 16 | – | 16 | .500 |
| Rice | 7 | – | 11 | .389 | 13 | – | 18 | .419 |
| East Carolina | 6 | – | 12 | .333 | 11 | – | 20 | .355 |
| UTSA | 1 | – | 17 | .056 | 5 | – | 25 | .167 |
† 2026 American tournament winner

The 2025–26 Charlotte 49ers men's basketball team represented the University of North Carolina at Charlotte during the 2025–26 NCAA Division I men's basketball season. The team was led by third-year head coach Aaron Fearne, and played their home games at Dale F. Halton Arena located in Charlotte, North Carolina, in their third season as members in the American Conference.

== Previous season ==
The 49ers finished the 2024–25 season with a record of 11–22, 3–15 in AAC play to finish in 13th place. They lost in the second of the AAC tournament to FAU.

== Roster ==
2025–26 Charlotte 49ers men's basketball team
Players
Coaches

| Pos. | # | Name | Height | Weight | Year | Previous school | Hometown |
|---|---|---|---|---|---|---|---|
| G | 1 | Kylan Blackmon | 6 ft 4 in (1.93 m) | 200 lb (91 kg) | | Oxford HS; Coastal Carolina | Oxford, MS |
| G | 2 | Dezayne Mingo | 6 ft 4 in (1.93 m) | 190 lb (86 kg) | | Crestwood Prep; Marshall | Hamilton, ON |
| G | 3 | Ben Bradford | 6 ft 5 in (1.96 m) | 200 lb (91 kg) | | Gaithersburg HS | Gaithersburg, MD |
| G | 5 | Major Freeman | 6 ft 3 in (1.91 m) | 190 lb (86 kg) | | Archer HS; Siena | Atlanta, GA |
| C | 7 | Kuluel Mading | 6 ft 11 in (2.11 m) | 235 lb (107 kg) | | The Burlington School; Norfolk State | High Point, NC |
| G | 8 | Frank Oguche | 6 ft 8 in (2.03 m) | 210 lb (95 kg) | | 1 of 1 Academy | Melbourne, VIC |
| F/C | 9 | Spencer Elliott | 6 ft 10 in (2.08 m) | 225 lb (102 kg) | | St. Pius X HS; Tulane | Atlanta, GA |
| G | 10 | Damoni Harrison | 6 ft 4 in (1.93 m) | 185 lb (84 kg) | | Archer HS; Southern Indiana | Atlanta, GA |
| F | 11 | David Gomez | 6 ft 9 in (2.06 m) | 235 lb (107 kg) | | Hestia Menorca | Seville, Spain |
| F | 12 | Arden Conyers | 6 ft 7 in (2.01 m) | 210 lb (95 kg) | | Westwood HS; South Carolina | Columbia, SC |
| F | 15 | Ethan Butler | 6 ft 7 in (2.01 m) | 220 lb (100 kg) | | Southwest Academy; Northern Illinois | Toronto, ON |
| F | 22 | Andrew Bailey | 6 ft 6 in (1.98 m) | 210 lb (95 kg) | | Byron P. Steele HS; SV Boeblingen | Ramstein, Germany |
| F | 25 | Jarne Elouna Eyenga | 6 ft 10 in (2.08 m) | 235 lb (107 kg) | | JSerra Catholic HS | Keerbergen, Belgium |
| F | 31 | Nick Richart | 6 ft 10 in (2.08 m) | 230 lb (104 kg) | | Zionsville Community HS | Zionsville, IN |
| G | 44 | Raúl Villar | 6 ft 3 in (1.91 m) | 205 lb (93 kg) | | Escola Lleo XIII | Barcelona, Spain |
| C | 44 | Anton Bonke | 7 ft 2 in (2.18 m) | 260 lb (118 kg) | | Lycée Français J. M. G. Le Clézio; Providence | Port Vila, Vanuatu |

Head coach

- Aaron Fearne (Mayville State)

Assistant coach(es)

- Trevor DeLoach (UNC Wilmington)
- Ben Johnson (Green Bay)
- Brett Carey (UNC Asheville)
- Michael Wilmot
- Daniel Blaze (Biola)

Legend

- (C) Team captain
- (S) Suspended
- (I) Ineligible
- (W) Walk-on
- Injured
- Current redshirt

Roster
Last update: November 11, 2025

== Schedule and results ==
| Date time, TV | Rank^{#} | Opponent^{#} | Result | Record | High points | High rebounds | High assists | Site (attendance) city, state |
Non-conference regular season
| November 3, 2025*; 8:00 p.m., ESPN+ | | Indiana State | W 92–76 | 1–0 | 31 – Bradford | 14 – Bonke | 3 – Eyenga | Dale F. Halton Arena (3,255); Charlotte, NC |
| November 7, 2025*; 7:00 p.m., ESPN+ | | Tennessee Tech | W 70−65 | 2–0 | 17 – Freeman | 9 – Blackmon | 5 – Mingo | Dale F. Halton Arena (2,699); Charlotte, NC |
| November 11, 2025*; 7:00 p.m., ESPN+ | | Davidson | L 55–62 | 2–1 | 13 – Tied | 14 – Bonke | 5 – Mingo | Dale F. Halton Arena (3,712); Charlotte, NC |
| November 16, 2025*; 2:00 p.m., ACCNX | | at Virginia Tech | L 76–84 | 2–2 | 18 – Harrison | 10 – Bonke | 4 – Mingo | Cassell Coliseum (5,295); Blacksburg, VA |
| November 21, 2025*; 6:30 p.m., ESPN+ | | at Appalachian State | L 63–65 | 2–3 | 18 – Bradford | 9 – Tied | 3 – Tied | Holmes Center (3,043); Boone, NC |
| November 23, 2025*; 2:00 p.m., ESPN+ | | Shaw | W 83–79 | 3–3 | 17 – Bonke | 13 – Bonke | 5 – Tied | Dale F. Halton Arena (2,215); Charlotte, NC |
| November 27, 2025*; 1:30 p.m., ESPN2 | | vs. Illinois State; ESPN Events Invitational Imagination bracket semifinals | L 69–79 | 3–4 | 23 – Bradford | 7 – Bradford | 5 – Freeman | State Farm Field House (533); Kissimmee, FL |
| November 28, 2025*; 12:30 p.m., ESPN+ | | vs. Richmond; ESPN Events Invitational Imagination Bracket consolation | L 66–71 | 3–5 | 18 – Bradford | 5 – Tied | 1 – Tied | State Farm House; Kissimmee, FL |
| December 3, 2025*; 7:00 p.m., ESPN+ | | North Carolina A&T | W 74–57 | 4–5 | 14 – Mading | 6 – Mingo | 3 – Tied | Dale F. Halton Arena (2,822); Charlotte, NC |
| December 7, 2025*; 2:00 p.m., ESPN+ | | Utah State | L 53–79 | 4–6 | 13 – Bradford | 13 – Bonke | 2 – Tied | Dale F. Halton Arena (2,530); Charlotte, NC |
| December 14, 2025*; 4:00 p.m., FloHoops | | at Charleston | L 67–74 | 4–7 | 15 – Harrison | 8 – Bonke | 6 – Bradford | TD Arena (4,969); Charleston, SC |
| December 18, 2025*; 7:00 p.m., ESPN+ | | Lafayette | W 81–67 | 5–7 | 15 – Conyers | 7 – Bonke | 5 – Mingo | Dale F. Halton Arena (1,932); Charlotte, NC |
| December 21, 2025*; 2:00 p.m., ESPN+ | | UIC | W 88–76 ^{OT} | 6–7 | 26 – Bradford | 9 – Tied | 4 – Mingo | Dale F. Halton Arena (2,121); Charlotte, NC |
American regular season
| December 30, 2025; 7:00 p.m., ESPN+ | | Temple | L 73–76 | 6–8 (0–1) | 20 – Bonke | 8 – Bonke | 7 – Mingo | Dale F. Halton Arena (2,342); Charlotte, NC |
| January 3, 2026; 6:00 p.m., ESPNU | | Wichita State | W 104–100 ^{2OT} | 7–8 (1–1) | 26 – Mingo | 11 – Bonke | 10 – Mingo | Dale F. Halton Arena (2,673); Charlotte, NC |
| January 7, 2026; 8:00 p.m., ESPN+ | | at UTSA | W 74–58 | 8–8 (2–1) | 18 – Bradford | 10 – Elliott | 5 – Mingo | Convocation Center (623); San Antonio, TX |
| January 11, 2026; 2:00 p.m., ESPN+ | | at Rice | W 74–73 | 9–8 (3–1) | 18 – Conyers | 4 – Tied | 7 – Villar | Tudor Fieldhouse (1,245); Houston, TX |
| January 14, 2026; 7:00 p.m., ESPN+ | | Tulsa | L 74–86 | 9–9 (3–2) | 26 – Bradford | 4 – Bonke | 3 – Mingo | Dale F. Halton Arena (3,094); Charlotte, NC |
| January 18, 2026; 2:00 p.m., ESPN+ | | at East Carolina | W 73–70 | 10–9 (4–2) | 16 – Mingo | 8 – Bonke | 4 – Mingo | Williams Arena at Minges Coliseum (3,574); Greenville, NC |
| January 23, 2026; 7:30 p.m., ESPN+ | | Tulane | W 73–70 | 11–9 (5–2) | 20 – Mingo | 5 – Bonke | 4 – Freeman | Dale F. Halton Arena (2,454); Charlotte, NC |
| January 28, 2026; 7:00 p.m., ESPN+ | | at Temple | W 80–76 ^{OT} | 12–9 (6–2) | 25 – Bonke | 9 – Bonke | 10 – Mingo | Liacouras Center (2,659); Philadelphia, PA |
| January 30, 2026; 7:00 p.m., ESPNU | | Rice | W 80–70 | 13–9 (7–2) | 15 – Harrison | 12 – Bonke | 5 – Mingo | Dale F. Halton Arena (2,408); Charlotte, NC |
| February 4, 2026; 7:30 p.m., ESPN+ | | at Wichita State | L 64–74 | 13–10 (7–3) | 24 – Mingo | 7 – Bonke | 2 – Mingo | Charles Koch Arena (5,224); Wichita, KS |
| February 8, 2026; 2:00 p.m., ESPN+ | | at Memphis | L 54–77 | 13–11 (7–4) | 14 – Conyers | 4 – Tied | 3 – Mingo | FedExForum (9,147); Memphis, TN |
| February 15, 2026; 12:00 p.m., ESPNU | | UTSA | L 79−88 | 13–12 (7–5) | 20 – Bradford | 12 – Bradford | 5 – Bradford | Dale F. Halton Arena (2,347); Charlotte, NC |
| February 18, 2026; 8:00 p.m., ESPN+ | | at Tulsa | L 74–79 | 13–13 (7–6) | 19 – Mingo | 7 – Eyenga | 9 – Mingo | Reynolds Center (3,256); Tulsa, OK |
| February 21, 2026; 12:00 p.m., ESPN2 | | East Carolina | W 68–56 | 14–13 (8–6) | 12 – Tied | 9 – Bonke | 10 – Mingo | Dale F. Halton Arena (3,583); Charlotte, NC |
| February 25, 2026; 7:00 p.m., ESPN+ | | North Texas | W 80–79 | 15–13 (9–6) | 16 – Freeman | 5 – Bonke | 3 – Tied | Dale F. Halton Arena (2,509); Charlotte, NC |
| March 1, 2026; 2:00 p.m., ESPN+ | | at Florida Atlantic | L 76–77 ^{OT} | 15–14 (9–7) | 20 – Tied | 13 – Bonke | 5 – Villar | Eleanor R. Baldwin Arena (3,161); Boca Raton, FL |
| March 4, 2026; 7:00 p.m., ESPN+ | | UAB | L 74–80 | 15–15 (9–8) | 19 – Conyers | 7 – Bradford | 4 – Mingo | Dale F. Halton Arena (2,662); Charlotte, NC |
| March 8, 2026; 2:00 p.m., ESPN+ | | at South Florida | L 60–83 | 15–16 (9–9) | 13 – Bonke | 11 – Bonke | 5 – Villar | Yuengling Center (6,710); Tampa, FL |
American tournament
| March 12, 2026; 7:00 p.m., ESPNU | (5) | vs. (9) Tulane; Second round | W 74–60 | 16–16 | 29 – Bradford | 16 – Bonke | 11 – Mingo | Legacy Arena; Birmingham, AL |
| March 13, 2026; 1:00 p.m., ESPN2 | (5) | vs. (4) UAB; Quarterfinals | W 83–78 | 17–16 | 35 – Mingo | 9 – Bonke | 6 – Tied | Legacy Arena; Birmingham, AL |
| March 14, 2026; 3:00 p.m., ESPN2 | (5) | vs. (1) South Florida; Semifinals | L 64–86 | 17–17 | 15 – Bonke | 9 – Bonke | 2 – Elliott | Legacy Arena; Birmingham, AL |
*Non-conference game. ^{#}Rankings from AP poll. (#) Tournament seedings in parentheses. All times are in Eastern.
