= Claude Pardue =

American college basketball coach

Personal information
- Born: North Carolina, U.S.

Career information
- College: Emory University
- Coaching career: 2010–present

Career history

Coaching
- 2010–2011: UTEP (program coordinator)
- 2011–2019: Georgia State
- 2019–present: Tulane

Claude Pardue is an American college basketball coach and an assistant coach for the Tulane Green Wave men's basketball team.

== Early life and background ==
Pardue was born in North Carolina and raised in Myrtle Beach, South Carolina. He attended Carolina Forest High School before transferring to The Lawrenceville School in New Jersey, where he played under head coach Ron Kane and won Prep-A state and Mid-Atlantic Prep League championships.

His father, also named Claude Pardue, is the owner of Mystical Golf.

== Education and early career ==
Pardue played basketball at Emory University, where he earned a Bachelor of Arts degree in economics. He later completed a Master of Science in Sports Administration at Georgia State University.

At Emory, Pardue played for four seasons. He was named team captain during his senior year and received academic all-conference recognition.

== Coaching career ==
=== Early coaching career ===
During his college years, Pardue founded and coached Grand Stand's Finest, an AAU basketball program based in Myrtle Beach. The team reached the South Carolina state semifinals in both 2006 and 2007.

Pardue spent the 2010–11 season as a program coordinator at the University of Texas at El Paso (UTEP) under head coach Tim Floyd.

=== Georgia State ===
Pardue returned to Georgia State, beginning an eight-year tenure under head coach Ron Hunter.

During his tenure, the Panthers recorded multiple winning seasons and postseason appearances. They won Sun Belt Conference regular-season and tournament championships and advanced to the NCAA Tournament during the 2014–15, 2017–18, and 2018–19 seasons. In 2018–19, Georgia State won both the conference regular-season title and tournament championship, earning a second consecutive NCAA Tournament berth.

=== Tulane University ===
In 2019, Pardue joined Ron Hunter's coaching staff at Tulane University.

In 2020, Pardue was named one of Silver Waves Media's Most Impactful Men's Mid-Major Assistants. In 2023, he was selected to participate in the TopConnect Basketball Symposium.
