= St. Elizabeth High School (Delaware) =

Private, coeducational school in Wilmington, Delaware, United States

Location
- 1500 Cedar Street; Wilmington, New Castle County, Delaware 19805; United States; 39°44′18″N 75°34′24″W

Information
- Type: Private, Coeducational
- Motto: Pax
- Religious affiliations: Roman Catholic; Benedictine
- Denomination: Roman Catholic
- Patron saints: St. Benedict, St. Scholastica, and St. Elizabeth
- Established: 1940 (86 years ago)
- Founder: James M. Grant
- Oversight: Diocese of Wilmington
- CEEB code: 080190
- Principal: Adrienne Tolvaisa
- Pastor: Fr. Roger DiBuo
- Grades: 9–12
- Colors: Maroon and gold
- Mascot: Viktor the Viking
- Team name: Vikings
- Accreditation: Middle States Association of Colleges and Schools
- Yearbook: The Magnificat
- Website: www.steschools.org

St. Elizabeth High School is a coeducational Catholic high school in Wilmington, Delaware. It is part of the Roman Catholic Diocese of Wilmington. The St. Elizabeth school was founded in 1908 while the high school was founded in 1940 by James M. Grant.

Originally, the school was staffed by sisters of the Benedictine order. St. Elizabeth High School shares many facilities with the St. Elizabeth Elementary School and receives a good share of its high school enrollment from the elementary school graduates. The school colors are maroon and gold.

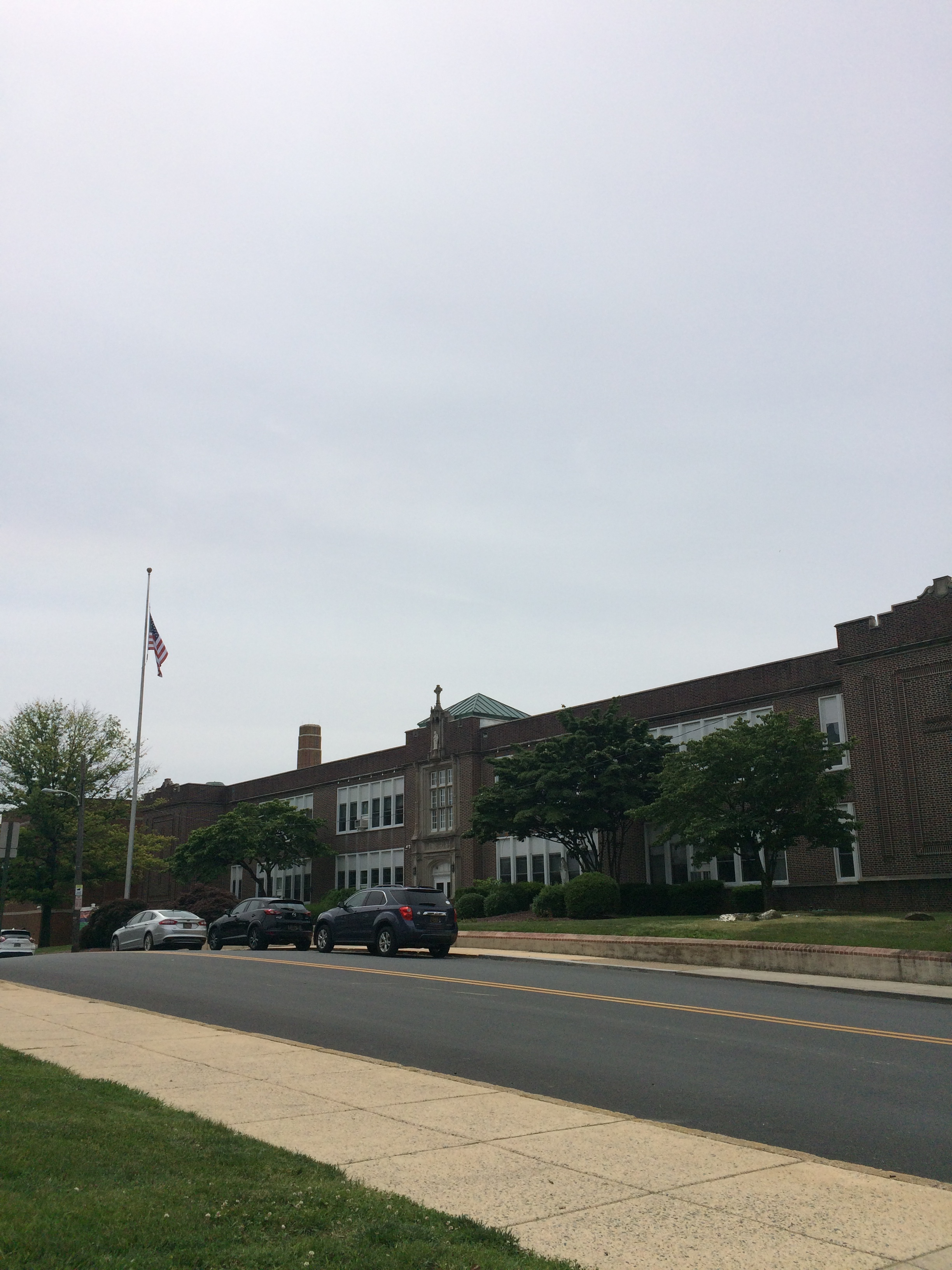
Exterior of Saint Elizabeth High School in Wilmington, DE

== Notable alumni ==
- Malik Curry (2017), basketball player who plays overseas
- Aiden Tobiason (2024), basketball player for the Syracuse Orange
