= Aiden Tobiason =

American basketball player

No. 25 – Syracuse Orange
- Position: Guard
- Conference: Atlantic Coast Conference

Personal information
- Born: May 11, 2006 (age 20)
- Listed height: 6 ft 6 in (1.98 m)
- Listed weight: 210 lb (95 kg)

Career information
- High school: St. Elizabeth (Wilmington, Delaware)
- College: Temple (2024–2026); Syracuse (2026–present)

Career highlights
- AAC All-Freshman Team (2025)

Aiden Tobiason (born May 11, 2006) is an American college basketball player for the Syracuse Orange of the Atlantic Coast Conference. He previously played for the Temple Owls.

== High school career ==
Tobiason is a native of Wilmington, Delaware and attended high school at St. Elizabeth High School in Wilmington.

== College career ==
Tobiason began his college career at Temple University in 2024. As a freshman, he averaged 4.8 points, 2.1 rebounds, and 1.0 assists per game while appearing in 27 games and starting in 22 games. Temple finished with a 17-15 record in his freshman year. He was named to the American Conference All-Freshman Team.

As a sophomore at Temple, Tobiason averaged career highs in points, rebounds, and assists. He started in all 32 games that he played and averaged 15.3 points, 3.7 rebounds, and 2.0 assists per game. The Owls had a 16-16 record in the 2025-26 season.

On April 24, 2026, Tobiason transferred to Syracuse University.
