= Mystical Golf =

Coordinates: 33.773°N 78.961°W

- Interactive map of Mystical Golf

Club information
- Location: Myrtle Beach, South Carolina, United States
- Established: 1989 (first course opened)
- Type: Resort
- Owner: Claude Pardue
- Website: Official website
- Designed by: Dan Maples

Mystical Golf is a golf resort located in Myrtle Beach, South Carolina, developed and operated by Claude Pardue. The resort has multiple golf courses and is best known for its three 18-hole championship layouts.

== Courses ==
Mystical Golf's courses were designed by golf course architect Dan Maples. The courses were built west of the Intracoastal Waterway near U.S. Route 501 during the early development of the Carolina Forest area.

| Course | Architect | Year opened | Yardage (championship tees) | Slope rating | Notable design features | Recognition |
|---|---|---|---|---|---|---|
| The Witch | Dan Maples | 1989 | 6,796 yards | 133 | Built within wetlands and forested areas; approximately 4,000 feet of bridges between holes; elevation changes | Four-and-a-half-star rating from Golf Digest |
| Man-O-War Golf Club | Dan Maples | 1996 | ~7,000 yards | 141 | Water hazards on every hole; consecutive island greens (holes 14 and 15) | Four-star rating from Golf Digest; named Golf Course of the Year (2017) by the Myrtle Beach Area Golf Course Owners Association |
| The Wizard | Dan Maples | 1996 | — | — | Wide fairways; sod-faced bunkers; water features on closing holes | Four-star rating from Golf Digest |

== Operations ==
From 2003 to 2017, day-to-day operations of Mystical Golf were overseen by chief operating officer Elwin Miles.

In the 1990s, Mystical Golf's courses experienced high usage, with annual rounds per course exceeding 60,000. In subsequent years, participation declined across the Myrtle Beach area, and play at Mystical Golf facilities decreased to about 40,000 rounds annually.
