= Henry Miller (disambiguation) =

Henry Miller (1891–1980) was an American writer.

Henry Miller may also refer to:

== Politics ==
- Henry W. Miller (1807–1885), member of the Iowa legislature
- Henry Miller (Australian politician) (1809–1888), Australian politician and banker
- Henry Miller (New Zealand politician) (1830–1918), New Zealand politician
- Henry Miller (Wisconsin judge) (1849–1920), American politician, businessman, and jurist
- Henry Horton Miller (1861–1916), Canadian politician
- Henry D. Miller (1867–1945), Iowa politician
- Henry Pomeroy Miller (1884–1946), Texas politician

== Sports ==
- Henry Miller (cricketer) (1859–1927), English cricketer
- Heinie Miller (1893–1964), American football player and coach
- Hank Miller (1917–1972), American Negro league baseball player
- Henry Armstrong Miller (1969–2026), aka Sentoryū Henri, mixed martial arts fighter and former sumo wrestler

== Others ==
- Henry Miller (British Army officer) (1785–1866), first commandant of the Moreton Bay penal colony and founder of Brisbane
- Henry Miller (rancher) (1827–1916), German-American landowner and cattle rancher, known as the Cattle King
- Henry C. Miller (1828–1899), Justice of the Louisiana Supreme Court
- Henry Miller (actor) (1858–1926), English-born American actor
- Henry Miller (IBEW) (1858–1896), first Grand President of the International Brotherhood of Electrical Workers
- Henry J. F. Miller (1890–1949), demoted United States Army Air Corps major general
- Henry Miller (clinician) (1913–1976), former Vice-Chancellor at Newcastle University
- Henry F. Miller (born 1916), American architect, designer of Henry F. Miller House
- Henry Miller (lawyer) (1931–2020), American lawyer and jurist
- Henry I. Miller (born 1947), American medical researcher and columnist
- Henry Ned Miller (1925–2016), American country music singer-songwriter

== See also ==
- Henry Miller (DC Comics), fictional character and alter ego of the Atom Man
- Henry Miller House (disambiguation)
- Henry Millar (died 1959), Irish rugby player
- Harry Miller (disambiguation)
- Heinrich Müller (disambiguation)
