= Harry Miller =

Harry Miller may refer to:

== Entertainment ==
- Harry S. Miller (1867–?), American lyricist, composer, and playwright
- Harry M. Miller (1934–2018), Australian promoter and publicist
- Harry Miller (jazz bassist) (1941–1983), South African musician exiled to England, founder of Ogun Records

== Sports ==
- Harry Miller (auto racing) (1875–1943), American racing car builder
- Harry Miller (American football) (1889–?), American football player and coach
- Harry Miller (cricketer) (1907–1966), English cricketer
- Harry Miller (baseball) (1860-1919), American Baseball Player
- Harry Miller (basketball, born 1923) (1923–2007), American basketball player, Toronto Huskies
- Harry Miller (basketball, born 1927) (1927–2013), American college basketball coach at Fresno State, Wichita State and Stephen F. Austin
- Harry Miller (basketball, born 1950), American college basketball coach at Baylor
- Harry Miller (footballer) (born 1985), Australian rules footballer with Hawthorn, drafted in 2003

== Other ==
- Harry Herbert Miller (1879–1968), United States Navy sailor and Medal of Honor recipient
- Harry Willis Miller (1879–1977), physician, thyroid surgeon and Seventh-day Adventist missionary
- Harry Miller (writer) (1923–1998), journalist and naturalist who lived in India
- Harry E. Miller Jr. (born 1958), officer in the Army National Guard
- Harry Miller Middle School, a school in Rothesay, New Brunswick, Canada.

== See also ==
- Henry Miller (disambiguation)
- Harold Miller (disambiguation)
- Harrison Miller (disambiguation)
- Harry Millar (footballer) (1873–1960), Scottish footballer
- Harry Millar (rugby union), Irish international rugby union player
