= List of North Texas Mean Green men's basketball head coaches =

The following is a list of North Texas Mean Green men's basketball head coaches. There have been 20 head coaches of the Mean Green in their 107-season history.

North Texas' current head coach is Daniyal Robinson. He was hired as the Mean Green's head coach in March 2025, replacing Ross Hodge, who left to become the head coach at West Virginia.

No.	Tenure	Coach	Years	Record	Pct.
1	1916–1920; 1921–1924	James W. St. Clair	7	58–21	.734
2	1920–1921	Theron J. Fouts	1	5–3	.625
3	1924–1929	John B. Reid	5	79–31	.718
4	1929–1933	Terrance Myracle	4	38–36	.514
5	1933–1935	Jack Sisco	2	15–27	.357
6	1935–1959 (Note: North Texas did not field a team for the 1943–44 or 1944–45 season due to World War II.)	Pete Shands	22	224–258	.465
7	1959–1965	Charles Johnson	6	36–114	.240
8	1965–1970	Dan Spika	5	58–69	.457
9	1970–1971	Harry Miller	1	10–15	.400
10	1971–1975	Gene Robbins	4	36–67	.350
11	1975–1983	Bill Blakeley	8	134–85	.612
12	1983–1986	Tommy Newman	3	24–60	.286
13	1986–1993	Jimmy Gales	7	84–118	.416
14	1993–1997	Tim Jankovich	4	53–57	.482
15	1997–2001	Vic Trilli	4	20–87	.187
16	2001–2012	Johnny Jones	11	190–146	.565
17	2012–2017	Tony Benford	5	62–86	.419
18	2017–2023	Grant McCasland	6	135–65	.675
19	2023–2025	Ross Hodge	2	46–24	.657
20	2025–present	Daniyal Robinson	0	0–0	–
Totals		20 coaches	107 seasons	1,411–1,369	.508
Records updated through end of 2024–25 season Source
