= Harry Millar =

Harry Millar may refer to:

- Harry Millar (footballer) (1873–1960), Scottish footballer
- Harry Millar (rugby union) (1924—2003), Irish international rugby union player

== See also ==
- Harry Miller (disambiguation)
