= Senator Miller =

Senator Miller may refer to:

== Members of the United States Senate ==
- Homer V. M. Miller (1814–1896), U.S. Senator from Georgia in 1871
- Jack Miller (Iowa politician) (1916–1994), U.S. Senator from Iowa from 1961 to 1973
- Jacob W. Miller (1800–1862), U.S. Senator from New Jersey from 1841 to 1853
- John E. Miller (1888–1981), U.S. Senator from Arkansas from 1937 to 1941
- John Franklin Miller (senator) (1831–1886), U.S. Senator from California from 1881
- Stephen Decatur Miller (1787–1838), U.S. Senator from South Carolina from 1831 to 1833
- Warner Miller (1838–1918), U.S. Senator from New York from 1881 to 1887
- Zell Miller (1932–2018), U.S. Senator from Georgia from 2000 to 2005

== United States state senate members ==
- Anton M. Miller (1876–1954), Wisconsin State Senate
- Archie H. Miller (1886–1958), Minnesota State Senate
- Art Miller Jr. (born 1946), Michigan State Senate
- Arthur L. Miller (1892–1967), Nebraska State Senate
- Barry Miller (politician) (1864–1933), Texas State Senate
- Bert H. Miller (1879–1949), Idaho State Senate
- Brad Miller (politician) (born 1953), North Carolina State Senate
- Butch Miller (politician) (born 1956), Georgia State Senate
- Charles R. Miller (politician) (1857–1927), Delaware State Senate
- Clyde L. Miller (1910–1988), Utah State Senate
- Dale Miller (politician) (born 1949), Ohio State Senate
- David Miller (Iowa politician) (born 1946), Iowa State Senate
- Edwin E. Miller (died 1950), Pennsylvania State Senate
- Elizabeth Ruby Miller (1905–1988), Iowa State Senate
- Eugene Miller (Texas politician) (1899–1948), Texas Senate State Senate
- Ezra Miller (politician) (1812–1885), Wisconsin State Senate and New Jersey State Senate
- Fleming Bowyer Miller (1792–1874), Virginia State Senate
- George Miller Jr. (1914–1969), California State Senate
- Henry D. Miller (1867–1945), Iowa State Senate
- Hinda Miller (born 1950), Vermont State Senate
- Jacob Henry Miller (1865–1920), Ohio State Senate
- Jeff Miller (Tennessee politician) (born 1962), Tennessee State Senate
- Jeremy Miller (politician) (born 1983), Minnesota State Senate
- Jerry D. Miller (born 1942), Nebraska State Senate
- Jess Miller (1884–1965), Wisconsin State Senate
- Jesse Miller (politician) (1800–1850), Pennsylvania State Senate
- Joe Miller (North Dakota politician), North Dakota State Senate
- John Miller (Virginia politician) (1947–2016), Virginia State Senate
- Joshua Miller (politician) (born 1954), Rhode Island State Senate
- Julius Miller (1880–1955), New York State Senate
- Keith Harvey Miller (1925–2019), Alaska State Senate
- Ken Miller (Montana politician), Montana State Senate
- Les Miller (Florida politician) (born 1951), Florida State Senate
- Leslie A. Miller (1886–1970), Wyoming State Senate
- Mark F. Miller (born 1943), Wisconsin State Senate
- Mike W. Miller (born 1951), Alaska State Senate
- Nathan H. Miller (born 1943), Virginia State Senate
- Patricia Miller (Indiana politician) (born 1936), Indiana State Senate
- Ray Miller (Ohio legislator) (born 1949), Ohio State Senate
- Ronald F. Miller (born 1954), West Virginia State Senate
- Smith Miller (1804–1872), Indiana State Senate
- Terry Miller (politician) (1942–1989), Alaska State Senate
- Thomas E. Miller (1849–1938), South Carolina State Senate
- Thomas V. Miller Jr. (1942–2021), Maryland State Senate
- V. Richard Miller (1939–2016), Indiana State Senate
- Vic Miller (born 1951), Kansas State Senate
- Warren Miller (West Virginia Congressman) (1847–1920), West Virginia State Senate
- William Miller (Confederate Army officer) (1820–1909), Florida State Senate
- William Miller (North Carolina politician) (1783–1825), North Carolina State Senate
- Yvonne B. Miller (1934–2012), Virginia State Senate

== See also ==
- Senator Millar (disambiguation)
- Senator Millner (disambiguation)
