= Harold Miller =

Harold Miller may refer to:

- Harold Miller (bishop) (born 1950), Church of Ireland bishop
- Harold Miller (footballer) (1902–1988), Chelsea and England footballer
- Harold Miller (librarian) (1898–1989), New Zealand lecturer, librarian and writer
- Harold Miller (naval officer) (1903–1992), American naval officer and pilot, author, communications executive, and politician
- Hal Miller (actor), (born 1935) American stage and television actor, singer and painter
- USCGC Harold Miller, United States Coast Guard cutter
- Harold Miller (USCG), Coast Guard seaman awarded a Silver Star, namesake of the cutter

== See also ==
- Harry Miller (disambiguation)
- Harold Millar (1869–1942), Scottish graphic artist
