= Heinrich Müller =

Heinrich Müller may refer to:

- Heinrich Müller (cyclist) (1926–1997), Swiss cyclist
- Heinrich Müller (footballer, born 1888) (1888–1957), Swiss football player and manager
- Heinrich Müller (footballer, born 1909) (1909–2000), Austrian football player and coach
- Heinrich Müller (Gestapo) (1900-1945), head of the Nazi Gestapo
- Heinrich Müller (physiologist) (1820–1864), anatomist and physiologist
- Heinrich Müller (politician) (born 1981), South African Democratic Alliance politician
- Heinrich Müller (theologian) (1631–1675), Lutheran theologian
- Heinrich Anton Müller (1869–1930), Swiss painter

== Fiction ==
- A television series character

== See also ==
- Heini Müller (footballer, born 1934), German footballer
- Henry Miller (disambiguation)
