= Harrison Miller =

Harrison Miller may refer to:

- Harrison Miller (actor) in Takers
- Harrison Miller Farmhouse, see National Register of Historic Places listings in Goodhue County, Minnesota

== See also ==
- Harry Miller (disambiguation)
