= 2025–26 Wichita State Shockers men's basketball team =

American college basketball season

2025–26 Wichita State Shockers men's basketball

NIT, Quarterfinals
- Conference: American Conference
- Record: 24–12 (13–5 American)
- Head coach: Paul Mills (3rd season)
- Associate head coach: Kenton Paulino
- Assistant coaches: P.J. Couisnard; Josh Eilert; Iain Laymon; Xavier Holland
- Home arena: Charles Koch Arena

2025–26 American Conference men's basketball standings
	Conf.				Overall
Team	W		L	PCT	W		L	PCT
South Florida †	15	–	3	.833	25	–	9	.735
Wichita State	13	–	5	.722	24	–	11	.686
Tulsa	13	–	5	.722	28	–	7	.800
UAB	11	–	7	.611	20	–	12	.625
Charlotte	9	–	9	.500	17	–	17	.500
North Texas	9	–	9	.500	19	–	14	.576
Florida Atlantic	9	–	9	.500	18	–	15	.545
Memphis	8	–	10	.444	13	–	19	.406
Tulane	8	–	10	.444	18	–	15	.545
Temple	8	–	10	.444	16	–	16	.500
Rice	7	–	11	.389	13	–	18	.419
East Carolina	6	–	12	.333	11	–	20	.355
UTSA	1	–	17	.056	5	–	25	.167
† 2026 American tournament winner As of March 22, 2026

The 2025–26 Wichita State Shockers men's basketball team represented Wichita State University during the 2025–26 NCAA Division I men's basketball season. The Shockers, led by third-year head coach Paul Mills, played their home games at Charles Koch Arena in Wichita, Kansas as members of the American Conference.

== Previous season ==
The Shockers finished the season 19–15 and 8–10 in AAC play. They finished in eighth place in the AAC. In the second round of the AAC tournament, the Shockers beat South Florida, before losing to Memphis in the quarterfinals. The Shockers were invited to the 2025 NIT, where they lost in the first round to Oklahoma State.

== Roster ==
2025–26 Wichita State Shockers men's basketball team
Players
Coaches

Pos.	#	Name	Height	Weight	Year	Previous school	Hometown
F	0	Karon Boyd	6 ft 6 in (1.98 m)	225 lb (102 kg)	Sr	Cannon School; USC Aiken; East Tennessee State	Concord, NC
G	1	Kenyon Giles	5 ft 10 in (1.78 m)	172 lb (78 kg)	Sr	Silverado High School; Radford; UNC Greensboro	Chesapeake, VA
F	2	Jaret Valencia	6 ft 9 in (2.06 m)	202 lb (92 kg)	RS Jr	Legacy School of Sport Sciences; Monmouth	Quibdó, Colombia
G	3	Dre Kindell	5 ft 11 in (1.8 m)	168 lb (76 kg)	Sr	Barton CC	Cincinnati, OH
G	4	T.J. Williams	6 ft 5 in (1.96 m)	207 lb (94 kg)	RS Fr	Wichita Heights High School	Wichita, KS
G	5	Brian Amuneke	6 ft 5 in (1.96 m)	188 lb (85 kg)	So	Rancho Christian School; Fresno State	Los Angeles, CA
F	8	Dillon Battie	6 ft 9 in (2.06 m)	216 lb (98 kg)	So	Lancaster High School; Temple	Dallas, TX
G	9	Michael Gray Jr.	6 ft 2 in (1.88 m)	202 lb (92 kg)	Sr	Blue Ridge School; George Mason; Nicholls State	Fredericksburg, VA
G	10	Tyrus Rathan-Mayes	6 ft 6 in (1.98 m)	204 lb (93 kg)	Fr	Legacy School of Sport Sciences	Toronto, ON
G	11	Pierre Couisnard	6 ft 2 in (1.88 m)	172 lb (78 kg)	Fr	Legacy School of Sport Sciences	Houston, TX
G	12	Joy Ighovodja	6 ft 4 in (1.93 m)	214 lb (97 kg)	Jr	NBA Academy Africa	Abeokuta, Nigeria
F	20	Emmanuel Okorafor	6 ft 10 in (2.08 m)	236 lb (107 kg)	Sr	NBA Academy Africa; Louisville; Seton Hall	Aba, Nigeria
F	21	Henry Thengvall (W)	6 ft 7 in (2.01 m)	208 lb (94 kg)	RS Jr	Kapaun Mt. Carmel Catholic High School	Wichita, KS
F	22	Noah Hill	6 ft 8 in (2.03 m)	236 lb (107 kg)	Fr	Sunrise Christian Academy	Frisco, TX
C	44	Will Berg	7 ft 2 in (2.18 m)	265 lb (120 kg)	RS Jr	Riksbasketgymnasiet Lulea; Purdue	Stockholm, Sweden

Head coach

- Paul Mills (Texas A&M)

Assistant coach(es)

- Kenton Paulino (Texas)
- Josh Eilert (Kansas State)
- P. J. Couisnard (Wichita State)
- Iain Laymon (Indiana)
- Xavier Holland (Truett McConnell)

Legend

- (C) Team captain
- (S) Suspended
- (I) Ineligible
- (W) Walk-on
- Injured
- Current redshirt

Roster
Last update: November 14, 2025

== Schedule and results ==
Date time, TV	Rank^{#}	Opponent^{#}	Result	Record	High points	High rebounds	High assists	Site (attendance) city, state
Non-conference regular season
November 4, 2025*; 6:30 p.m., ESPN+		UNC Asheville	W 75–58	1–0	20 – Giles	10 – Boyd	5 – Kindell	Charles Koch Arena (5,366); Wichita, KS
November 8, 2025*; 6:00 p.m., ESPN+		Prairie View A&M	W 105–62	2–0	15 – Tied	11 – Williams	5 – Williams	Charles Koch Arena (5,352); Wichita, KS
November 13, 2025*; 6:30 p.m., ESPN+		Loyola Chicago	W 95–74	3–0	24 – Giles	10 – Berg	7 – Kindell	Charles Koch Arena (5,661); Wichita, KS
November 18, 2025*; 8:00 p.m., MW Network		at Boise State	L 59–62	3–1	15 – Giles	9 – Boyd	3 – Gray Jr.	ExtraMile Arena (9,725); Boise, ID
November 22, 2025*; 6:00 p.m., ESPN+		Milwaukee	W 75–58	4–1	24 – Giles	8 – Tied	3 – Kindell	Charles Koch Arena (5,941); Wichita, KS
November 26, 2025*; 6:00 p.m., ESPN2		vs. Saint Mary's; Battle 4 Atlantis first round	L 65–70	4–2	15 – Tied	9 – Berg	3 – Kindell	Imperial Arena (640); Paradise Island, Bahamas
November 27, 2025*; 7:30 p.m., ESPNU		vs. Colorado State; Battle 4 Atlantis consolation 2nd round	L 70–76	4–3	18 – Giles	11 – Boyd	5 – Kindell	Imperial Arena (707); Paradise Island, Bahamas
November 28, 2025*; 6:00 p.m., ESPNU		vs. Western Kentucky; Battle 4 Atlantis 7th place game	L 70–75	4–4	18 – Giles	7 – Tied	2 – Tied	Imperial Arena (1,061); Paradise Island, Bahamas
December 2, 2025*; 6:30 p.m., ESPN+		Mount Marty	W 95–69	5–4	18 – Gray Jr.	12 – Berg	6 – Kindell	Charles Koch Arena (5,015); Wichita, KS
December 6, 2025*; 7:00 p.m., ESPN+		at Northern Iowa	W 74–69 ^{OT}	6–4	18 – Williams	9 – Williams	4 – Gray Jr.	McLeod Center (4,034); Cedar Falls, IA
December 13, 2025*; 11:00 a.m., ESPNU		DePaul	L 58–61	6–5	16 – Giles	8 – Okorafor	2 – Kindell	Charles Koch Arena (5,988); Wichita, KS
December 17, 2025*; 6:30 p.m., ESPN+		Wofford	W 84–73	7–5	22 – Giles	7 – Berg	2 – Tied	Charles Koch Arena (4,913); Wichita, KS
December 21, 2025*; 4:00 p.m., ESPN+		Eastern Kentucky	W 88–57	8–5	22 – Boyd	12 – Berg	6 – Kindell	Charles Koch Arena (5,890); Wichita, KS
American regular season
December 31, 2025; 3:00 p.m., ESPN2		at UAB	W 75−70	9−5 (1−0)	26 – Giles	10 – Berg	3 – Kindell	Bartow Arena (3,614); Birmingham, AL
January 3, 2026; 5:00 p.m., ESPNU		at Charlotte	L 100−104 ^{2OT}	9−6 (1−1)	27 – Giles	12 – Boyd	4 – Gray Jr.	Dale F. Halton Arena (2,673); Charlotte, NC
January 7, 2026; 6:30 p.m., ESPN+		Rice	L 64–66	9–7 (1–2)	25 – Gray Jr.	10 – Tied	2 – Gray Jr.	Charles Koch Arena (5,111); Wichita, KS
January 11, 2026; 2:00 p.m., ESPN2		North Texas	W 78–67	10–7 (2–2)	33 – Giles	9 – Battie	2 – Tied	Charles Koch Arena (5,549); Wichita, KS
January 15, 2026; 8:00 p.m., ESPN2		at Florida Atlantic	L 67–85	10–8 (2–3)	14 – Berg	10 – Hill	4 – Kindell	Eleanor R. Baldwin Arena (3,161); Boca Raton, FL
January 18, 2026; 1:00 p.m., ESPN2		at South Florida	W 86–85 ^{OT}	11–8 (3–3)	22 – Giles	15 – Berg	2 – Tied	Yuengling Center (4,544); Tampa, FL
January 21, 2026; 6:30 p.m., ESPN+		East Carolina	W 77–60	12–8 (4–3)	27 – Giles	9 – Berg	4 – Gray Jr.	Charles Koch Arena (5,588); Wichita, KS
January 24, 2026; 3:00 p.m., ESPN2		Memphis	W 74–59	13–8 (5–3)	14 – Tied	10 – Berg	4 – Berg	Charles Koch Arena (6,226); Wichita, KS
February 1, 2026; 1:00 p.m., ESPNU		at Tulsa; Rivalry	L 83–93	13–9 (5–4)	17 – Giles	6 – Berg	3 – Tied	Reynolds Center (5,109); Tulsa, OK
February 4, 2026; 6:30 p.m., ESPN+		Charlotte	W 74–64	14–9 (6–4)	23 – Giles	7 – Berg	3 – Tied	Charles Koch Arena (5,224); Wichita, KS
February 8, 2026; 1:00 p.m., ESPN+		at Tulane	W 75–61	15–9 (7–4)	19 – Battie	11 – Boyd	6 – Gray Jr.	Devlin Fieldhouse (1,050); New Orleans, LA
February 11, 2026; 6:30 p.m., ESPN+		South Florida	L 58–66	15–10 (7–5)	24 – Giles	13 – Berg	10 – Gray Jr.	Charles Koch Arena (6,676); Wichita, KS
February 14, 2026; 6:00 p.m., ESPN+		Tulsa; Rivalry	W 81–77	16–10 (8–5)	31 – Giles	8 – Tied	3 – Gray Jr.	Charles Koch Arena (7,569); Wichita, KS
February 18, 2026; 6:00 p.m., ESPN+		at East Carolina	W 92–89 ^{2OT}	17–10 (9–5)	27 – Williams	9 – Berg	2 – Tied	Minges Coliseum (3,150); Greenville, NC
February 21, 2026; 5:00 p.m., ESPN2		Temple	W 69–57	18–10 (10–5)	27 – Giles	10 – Okorafor	2 – Williams	Charles Koch Arena (8,094); Wichita, KS
February 26, 2026; 8:00 p.m., ESPN2		at Memphis	W 88–82	19–10 (11–5)	22 – Giles	12 – Berg	5 – Boyd	FedExForum (9,233); Memphis, TN
March 1, 2026; 7:00 p.m., ESPN+		at UTSA	W 84–67	20–10 (12–5)	28 – Giles	12 – Berg	2 – Tied	Convocation Center (1,025); San Antonio, TX
March 7, 2026; 3:00 p.m., ESPNU		Florida Atlantic	W 88–70	21–10 (13–5)	22 – Battie	12 – Battie	4 – Tied	Charles Koch Arena (8,163); Wichita, KS
American tournament
March 14, 2026; 4:30 p.m., ESPN2	(2)	vs. (3) Tulsa; Semifinal/Rivalry	W 81–68	22–10	27 – Giles	14 – Berg	6 – Gray Jr.	Legacy Arena; Birmingham, AL
March 15, 2026; 2:15 p.m., ESPN	(2)	vs. (1) South Florida; Championship	L 55–70	22–11	15 – Battie	7 – Boyd	4 – Boyd	Legacy Arena; Birmingham, AL
NIT
March 17, 2026; 7:00 p.m., ESPNU	(3 T)	Wyoming; First round	W 74–70	23–11	17 – Williams	14 – Williams	5 – Gray Jr.	Charles Koch Arena (3,733); Wichita, KS
March 22, 2026; 7:30 p.m., ESPN2	(3 T)	at (2 T) Oklahoma State; Second round	W 96–70	24–11	28 – Giles	10 – Tied	4 – Kindell	Gallagher-Iba Arena (2,526); Stillwater, OK
March 24, 2026; 6:00 p.m., ESPN2	(3 T)	at (1 T) Tulsa; Quarterfinal/Rivalry	L 79–83	24–12	19 – Williams	8 – Tied	3 – Gray Jr.	Reynolds Center (3,198); Tulsa, OK
*Non-conference game. ^{#}Rankings from AP poll. (#) Tournament seedings in parentheses. T=Tulsa. All times are in Central.
