= Senator Millar =

Senator Millar may refer to:

- Fran Millar (born 1949), Georgia State Senate
- William Millar (politician) (1839–1913), Wisconsin State Senate

== See also ==
- Joseph Millard (1836–1922), U.S. Senator from Nebraska from 1901 to 1907
- Senator Miller (disambiguation)
