= 2025–26 UAB Blazers men's basketball team =

American college basketball season

2025–26 UAB Blazers men's basketball
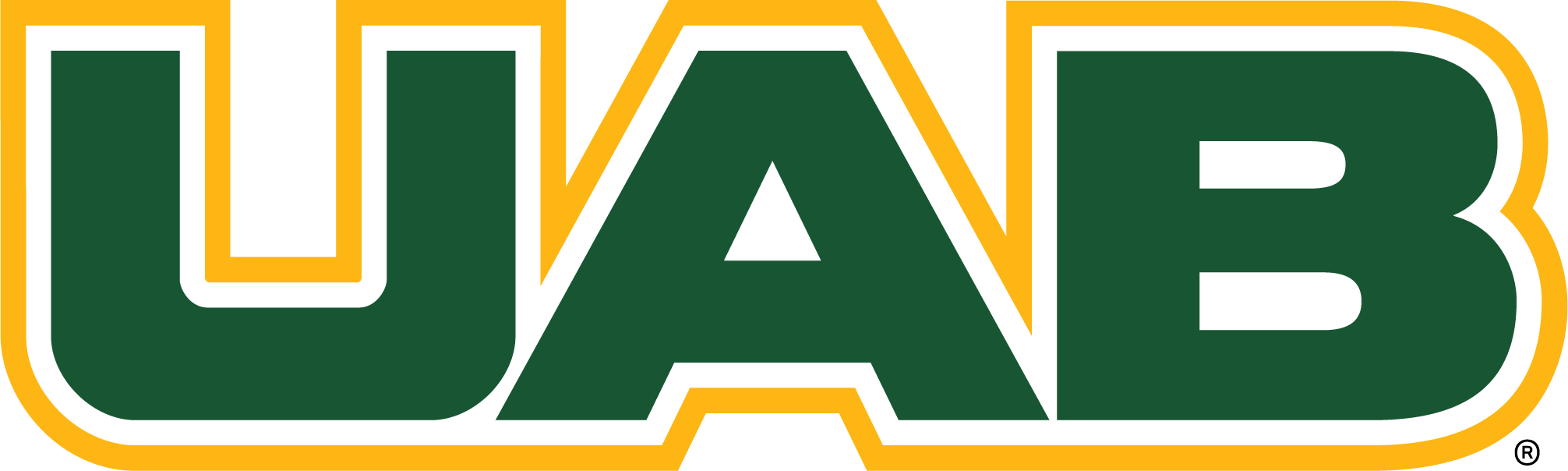
- Conference: American Conference
- Record: 20–12 (11–7 American)
- Head coach: Andy Kennedy (6th season)
- Associate head coach: Ryan Cross
- Assistant coaches: Rob Williams; Chris Shumate; Carter Heston
- Home arena: Bartow Arena

2025–26 American Conference men's basketball standings
	Conf.				Overall
Team	W		L	PCT	W		L	PCT
South Florida †	15	–	3	.833	25	–	9	.735
Wichita State	13	–	5	.722	24	–	12	.667
Tulsa	13	–	5	.722	29	–	7	.806
UAB	11	–	7	.611	20	–	12	.625
Charlotte	9	–	9	.500	17	–	17	.500
North Texas	9	–	9	.500	19	–	14	.576
Florida Atlantic	9	–	9	.500	18	–	15	.545
Memphis	8	–	10	.444	13	–	19	.406
Tulane	8	–	10	.444	18	–	15	.545
Temple	8	–	10	.444	16	–	16	.500
Rice	7	–	11	.389	13	–	18	.419
East Carolina	6	–	12	.333	11	–	20	.355
UTSA	1	–	17	.056	5	–	25	.167
† 2026 American tournament winner As of March 24, 2026

The 2025–26 UAB Blazers men's basketball team represented the University of Alabama at Birmingham during the 2025–26 NCAA Division I men's basketball season. The team was led by sixth-year head coach Andy Kennedy, and played their home games at the Bartow Arena located in Birmingham, Alabama as third-year members of American Conference.

== Previous season ==
The Blazers finished the 2024–25 season 24–13, 13–5 in AAC play to finish in third place. They defeated East Carolina in the quarterfinals and North Texas in the semifinals before losing to Memphis in the AAC tournament championship. They were invited to the 2025 National Invitation Tournament, where they defeated Saint Joseph's in the first round, and Santa Clara in the second round, before losing in the quarterfinals to UC Irvine.

== Roster ==
2025–26 UAB Blazers men's basketball team
Players
Coaches

Pos.	#	Name	Height	Weight	Year	Previous school	Hometown
G	0	Dayjaun Anderson	6 ft 2 in (1.88 m)	185 lb (84 kg)	So	Ponitz Career Tech Ctr; Triton College	Dayton, OH
F	2	KyeRon Lindsay–Martin	6 ft 8 in (2.03 m)	222 lb (101 kg)	Sr	Guyer HS; Murray State	Denton, TX
C	3	João Das Chagas	6 ft 10 in (2.08 m)	250 lb (113 kg)	Jr	Indian Hills CC	Niquelândia, Brazil
G	4	Ahmad Robinson	5 ft 10 in (1.78 m)	180 lb (82 kg)	Sr	Roselle Catholic HS; Mercer	West Orange, NJ
G	5	Salim London	6 ft 4 in (1.93 m)	193 lb (88 kg)	Fr	Hoover HS	Hoover, AL
F	6	Lance Carr	6 ft 7 in (2.01 m)	210 lb (95 kg)	Fr	Kimball HS	Dallas, TX
G	7	Ari Gooch	6 ft 2 in (1.88 m)	180 lb (82 kg)	So	Park Center Sr HS; McLennan CC	Minneapolis, MN
G	8	Quaran McPherson	6 ft 4 in (1.93 m)	200 lb (91 kg)	Jr	Woodstock Academy; Northern Illinois	Queens, NY
G	9	Joey Kahn	6 ft 4 in (1.93 m)	190 lb (86 kg)	Sr	St. Paul's Episcopal School; Coastal Carolina	Mobile, AL
	11	Chance Westry	6 ft 6 in (1.98 m)	205 lb (93 kg)	So	Arizona Compass Prep; Arizona	Harrisburg, PA
G	12	Jacob Meyer	6 ft 2 in (1.88 m)	190 lb (86 kg)	Jr	Holy Cross HS; DePaul	Covington, KY
F	15	Evan Chatman	6 ft 8 in (2.03 m)	220 lb (100 kg)	Jr	Harker Heights HS	Harker Heights, TX
G	21	Jorden Pittman	6 ft 0 in (1.83 m)	170 lb (77 kg)	Fr	Seminole HS	Sanford, FL
F	22	Justin Holloway	6 ft 7 in (2.01 m)	—	Fr	Opelika HS	Opelika, AL
F	23	Daniel Rivera	6 ft 7 in (2.01 m)	215 lb (98 kg)	Sr	Our Saviour Lutheran School; UMass	San Juan, PR

Head coach

- Andy Kennedy (UAB)

Assistant coach(es)

- Ryan Cross (Buffalo)
- Rob Williams (UAB)
- Chris Shumate (Murray State)
- Carter Heston

Legend

- (C) Team captain
- (S) Suspended
- (I) Ineligible
- (W) Walk-on
- Injured
- Current redshirt

Roster
Last update: November 17, 2025

== Schedule and results ==
Date time, TV	Rank^{#}	Opponent^{#}	Result	Record	High points	High rebounds	High assists	Site (attendance) city, state
Exhibition
October 23, 2025*; 6:30 p.m.		Vanderbilt	L 67–89	–	15 – Robinson	7 – Tied	2 – Tied	Bartow Arena; Birmingham, AL
October 29, 2025*; 6:30 p.m.		Western Kentucky	L 76–78	–	20 – Meyer	10 – Robinson	5 – London	Bartow Arena (2,012); Birmingham, AL
Non-conference regular season
November 3, 2025*; 6:30 p.m., ESPN+		Mississippi Valley State	W 106–55	1–0	23 – Westry	8 – Chatman	7 – Robinson	Bartow Arena (3,013); Birmingham, AL
November 7, 2025*; 8:00 p.m., ACCN		at NC State	L 70–94	1–1	15 – Meyer	10 – Chatman	5 – Westry	Lenovo Center (15,918); Raleigh, NC
November 11, 2025*; 6:30 p.m., ESPN+		Alabama State	L 74–77	1–2	25 – Westry	9 – Chatman	4 – Tied	Bartow Arena (3,556); Birmingham, AL
November 14, 2025*; 6:30 p.m., ESPN+		High Point	W 91–74	2–2	22 – Westry	7 – Chatman	6 – Westry	Bartow Arena (3,231); Birmingham, AL
November 17, 2025*; 6:30 p.m., ESPN+		Rhodes (D-III)	W 112–56	3–2	21 – Westry	15 – Rivera	4 – Tied	Bartow Arena (3,062); Birmingham, AL
November 21, 2025*; 6:30 p.m., ESPN+		South Alabama	W 80–72	4–2	24 – Meyer	12 – Chatman	11 – Westry	Bartow Arena (3,531); Birmingham, AL
November 24, 2025*; 12:30 p.m., PTB Live		vs. Southern Illinois; Jacksonville Classic	W 81–73	5–2	25 – Lindsay-Martin	10 – Lindsay-Martin	5 – Westry	Adams–Jenkins Community; Sports & Music Complex (246); Jacksonville, FL
November 25, 2025*; 3:00 p.m., PTB Live		vs. UTEP; Jacksonville Classic	W 75–59	6–2	21 – Meyer	10 – Lindsay-Martin	3 – Westry	Adams–Jenkins Community; Sports & Music Complex (146); Jacksonville, FL
December 1, 2025*; 6:30 p.m., ESPN+		at Middle Tennessee	L 61–76	6–3	12 – Anderson	11 – Chatman	4 – Robinson	Murphy Center (3,323); Murfreesboro, TN
December 5, 2025*; 6:30 p.m., ESPN+		at Drake	W 74–69	7–3	17 – Westry	15 – Chatman	2 – Tied	Knapp Center (3,560); Des Moines, IA
December 14, 2025*; 2:00 p.m., ESPN2		Troy	L 85–86	7–4	25 – Robinson	9 – Chatman	8 – Robinson	Bartow Arena (3,542); Birmingham, AL
December 17, 2025*; 6:30 p.m., ESPN+		Cleveland State	W 101–77	8–4	31 – Westry	9 – Lindsay-Martin	6 – Tied	Bartow Arena (3,112); Birmingham, AL
December 21, 2025*; 2:00 p.m., ESPN+		UNC Asheville	W 72–47	9–4	24 – Lindsay-Martin	8 – Lindsay-Martin	7 – Westry	Bartow Arena (3,161); Birmingham, AL
American regular season
December 31, 2025; 3:00 p.m., ESPNU		Wichita State	L 70–75	9–5 (0−1)	18 – Rivera	5 – Tied	5 – Westry	Bartow Arena (3,614); Birmingham, AL
January 4, 2026*; 12:00 p.m., ESPNU		at South Florida	W 109–106 ^{2OT}	10–5 (1–1)	24 – Westry	11 – Meyer	6 – Westry	Yuengling Center (3,397); Tampa, FL
January 7, 2026; 6:30 p.m., ESPN+		Florida Atlantic	L 71–76	10–6 (1–2)	17 – Westry	15 – Chatman	3 – Tied	Bartow Arena (3,152); Birmingham, AL
January 11, 2026; 1:00 p.m., ESPN+		at East Carolina	W 87–85 ^{OT}	11–6 (2–2)	29 – Meyer	8 – Chatman	5 – Tied	Minges Coliseum (3,296); Greenville, NC
January 14, 2026; 6:30 p.m., ESPN+		at Tulane	W 82–69	12–6 (3–2)	19 – Lindsay-Martin	12 – Lindsay-Martin	8 – Westry	Devlin Fieldhouse (1,541); New Orleans, LA
January 18, 2026; 2:00 p.m., ESPN+		Tulsa	L 77–99	12–7 (3–3)	15 – Lindsay-Martin	6 – Tied	4 – Tied	Bartow Arena (4,143); Birmingham, AL
January 22, 2026; 6:00 p.m., ESPN2		South Florida	L 69–82	12–8 (3–4)	14 – Rivera	11 – Chatman	3 – Tied	Bartow Arena (4,338); Birmingham, AL
January 28, 2026; 7:00 p.m., ESPN+		at UTSA	W 83–73	13–8 (4–4)	17 – Rivera	9 – Lindsay-Martin	6 – Westry	Convocation Center (1,024); San Antonio, TX
January 31, 2026; 7:00 p.m., ESPNU		at North Texas	W 72–68	14–8 (5–4)	18 – Westry	10 – Lindsay-Martin	4 – Westry	The Super Pit (3,905); Denton, TX
February 5, 2026; 8:00 p.m., ESPN2		Memphis; Battle for the Bones	L 80–90	14–9 (5–5)	15 – Westry	10 – Tied	6 – Westry	Bartow Arena (5,819); Birmingham, AL
February 8, 2026; 2:00 p.m., ESPN+		Rice	W 71–65	15–9 (6–5)	22 – Westry	17 – Chatman	9 – Westry	Bartow Arena (3,418); Birmingham, AL
February 11, 2026; 7:00 p.m., ESPN+		at Tulsa	W 68–63	16–9 (7–5)	20 – Anderson	13 – Chatman	5 – Westry	Reynolds Center (3,361); Tulsa, OK
February 15, 2026; 1:00 p.m., ESPNU		Tulane	L 54–55	16–10 (7–6)	16 – Anderson	13 – Chatman	4 – Westry	Bartow Arena (3,864); Birmingham, AL
February 18, 2026; 6:00 p.m., ESPNU		at Temple	W 76–71	17–10 (8–6)	24 – Westry	7 – Anderson	8 – Westry	Bartow Arena (2,761); Birmingham, AL
February 22, 2026; 11:00 a.m., ESPN2		at Memphis; Battle for the Bones	W 78–67	18–10 (9–6)	23 – Westry	8 – Tied	6 – Westry	FedExForum (9,541); Memphis, TN
March 1, 2026; 11:00 a.m., ESPNU		North Texas	L 58–62	18–11 (9–7)	17 – Westry	15 – Chatman	4 – Westry	Bartow Arena (3,537); Birmingham, AL
March 4, 2026; 6:00 p.m., ESPN+		at Charlotte	W 80–74	19–11 (10–7)	20 – Westry	9 – Chatman	11 – Westry	Dale F. Halton Arena (2,662); Charlotte, NC
March 8, 2026; 2:00 p.m., ESPN+		East Carolina	W 90–83	20–11 (11–7)	22 – Tied	8 – Lindsay-Martin	11 – Westry	Bartow Arena (4,123); Birmingham, AL
American tournament
March 13, 2026; 12:00 p.m., ESPN2	(4)	vs. (5) Charlotte; Quarterfinal	L 78–83	20–12	20 – Rivera	9 – Rivera	15 – Westry	Legacy Arena; Birmingham, AL
*Non-conference game. ^{#}Rankings from AP poll. (#) Tournament seedings in parentheses. All times are in Central.
