= Henry Miller House =

Henry Miller House may refer to:

in the United States

(by state)

- Henry F. Miller House, in Orange, Connecticut, listed on the National Register of Historic Places (NRHP)
- Henry Miller House (Bellevue, Idaho), NRHP-listed
- Henry W. Miller House, near Galena, Illinois, NRHP-listed
- Henry B. Miller House, Portland, Oregon, NRHP-listed
- Henry Miller House (Mossy Creek, Virginia), NRHP-listed
- Henry Miller House (Wausau, Wisconsin), listed on the NRHP in Marathon County, Wisconsin
