= Senator Millner =

Senator Millner may refer to:

- F. Ann Millner (fl. 1980s–2010s), Utah State Senate
- John Millner (born c. 1951), Illinois State Senate

== See also ==
- Senator Miller (disambiguation)
