= Acrisure Series =

American college basketball tournament

- Sport: College basketball
- Founded: 2023
- No. of teams: 20 playing at Acrisure Arena in 2025, divided into six brackets and 12 participating only in on-campus games 26 (2026)
- Country: United States
- Venue: Acrisure Arena
- Broadcasters: Fox (2023) truTV (2024–); CBS Sports Network (2025–)
- Sponsor: Acrisure
- Website: Acrisure Series

The Acrisure Series is a multiple-team NCAA Division I college basketball tournament played during Thanksgiving week, at Acrisure Arena in Thousand Palms, California. The event includes several on-campus games followed by multiple four-team brackets and stand-alone games contested at Acrisure Arena.

== Tournament history ==
Men's events
| Year | Division | Winner | Score | Opponent | Other participants† | Tournament MVP |
|---|---|---|---|---|---|---|
| 2026 | Acrisure Series solo game | Duke | 78–74 | Washington State | | |
| 2025 | Acrisure Classic | Iowa | 59–46 | Grand Canyon | Utah, Ole Miss | Bennett Stirtz, Iowa |
| 2025 | Acrisure Holiday Classic | Colorado | 81–68 | Washington | Nevada, San Francisco | Bangot Dak, Colorado |
| 2025 | Acrisure Holiday Invitational | Tulsa | 63–60 | Northern Iowa | San Jose State, Loyola Chicago | Miles Barnstable, Tulsa |
| 2025 | Acrisure Invitational | Stanford | 78–77 | Saint Louis | Santa Clara, Minnesota | Benny Gealer, Stanford |
| 2025 | Acrisure Series solo games | California Baptist | 76–61 | San Diego | | |
| 2025 | Acrisure Series solo games | Fresno State | 76–53 | Pepperdine | | |
| 2024 | Acrisure Classic | Arizona State | 68–64 | Saint Mary's | New Mexico, USC | Joson Sanon, Arizona State |
| 2024 | Acrisure Holiday Invitational | SMU | 77–60 | Washington State | California Baptist, Fresno State | Boopie Miller, SMU |
| 2024 | Acrisure Invitational | Washington | 76–69 | Santa Clara | Colorado State, TCU | Great Osobor, Washington |
| 2024 | Acrisure Series Showcase | Grand Canyon | 78–71 | Stanford | | |
| 2023 | Acrisure Classic | Arizona | 74–68 | Michigan State | Alcorn State, UT Arlington | Keshad Johnson, Arizona |
| 2023 | Acrisure Invitational | Hawaii | 77–66 | San Diego | Arkansas State, UT Rio Grande Valley | Noel Coleman, Hawaii |
† Excludes teams that played on-campus games only.

Women's event
| Year | Division | Winner | Score | Opponent | Other participants | Tournament MVP |
|---|---|---|---|---|---|---|
| 2024 | Acrisure Classic | Michigan State | 78–70 | Vanderbilt | Arizona, California | Julia Ayrault, Michigan State |

== 2026 ==
=== Pod 5 ===
| November 21; 11:00 a.m. PT |
| Fordham | 87 |
| Portland | 69 |

| November 21; 1:30 p.m. PT |
| UC Irvine | 64 |
| San Diego | 67 |

| November 21; 4:00 p.m. PT |
| California Baptist | 73 |
| Loyola Marymount | 80 |

| November 22; 11:00 a.m. PT |
| San Diego |
| Fordham |

| November 22; 1:30 p.m. PT |
| UC Irvine |
| Loyola Marymount |

| November 22; 4:00 p.m. PT |
| California Baptist |
| Portland |

=== Pod 4 ===
Third place November 23; 9:00 p.m. PT

Semifinals; November 22
6:30 p.m. PT
Seattle
UC San Diego
9:00 p.m. PT
San Jose State
Loyola Chicago

Championship; November 23; 6:30 p.m. PT

=== Pod 3 ===
| November 23; 11:00 a.m. PT |
| Tulsa |
| Oregon State |

| November 23; 1:30 p.m. PT |
| Nevada |
| San Francisco |

| November 23; 4:00 p.m. PT |
| Illinois State |
| Santa Clara |

| November 24; 11:00 a.m. PT |
| Oregon State |
| San Francisco |

| November 24; 1:30 p.m. PT |
| Tulsa |
| Illinois State |

| November 24; 4:00 p.m. PT |
| Nevada |
| Santa Clara |

=== Pod 2 ===
Third place November 25; 9:00 p.m. PT

Semifinals; November 24
6:30 p.m. PT
Grand Canyon
Saint Louis
9:00 p.m. PT
Stanford
Colorado

Championship; November 25; 6:30 p.m. PT

=== Pod 1 ===
| November 25; 11:00 a.m. PT |
| Arizona State |
| LSU |

| November 25; 1:30 p.m. PT |
| USC |
| South Carolina |

| November 25; 4:00 p.m. PT |
| SMU |
| Utah State |

| November 26; 11:00 a.m. PT |
| South Carolina |
| Arizona State |

| November 26; 1:30 p.m. PT |
| Utah State |
| USC |

| November 26; 4:00 p.m. PT |
| SMU |
| LSU |

== 2025 ==
NCAA legislation that ended the ban on teams from the same conference participating in the same muti-team event (MTE) created new flexibility in 2025. Multiple brackets of the Acrisure Series could now be treated as a single qualifying MTE. Therefore, teams participating only in on-campus games could play those games against teams in different brackets. Each of the 24 teams (16 playing at Acrisure Arena and eight playing only in on-campus games) participated in three games in the event.

=== Acrisure Series on-campus games ===
Twenty on-campus games were played among teams participating in the Acrisure Classic, the Acrisure Holiday Classic, the Acrisure Holiday Invitational and the Acrisure Invitational brackets. Each of the 16 teams in the four brackets hosted one on-campus game, and four additional on-campus games were contested among teams not playing at Acrisure Arena.

Game recaps:

Home teams listed second.

| Campus-site game (SECN+); November 18 |
| Austin Peay | 65 |
| Ole Miss | 72 |

| Campus-site game (ESPN+); November 18 |
| Purdue Fort Wayne | 77 |
| Utah | 85 |

| Campus-site game (ESPN+); November 18 |
| Northwestern State | 64 |
| San Francisco | 84 |

| Campus-site game (Peacock/NBCSN); November 18 |
| Southern | 93 |
| Washington | 99^{2OT} |

| Campus-site game (MW Network); November 18 |
| UC Davis | 75 |
| Nevada | 71 |

| Campus-site game (ESPN+); November 18 |
| Northern Illinois | 57 |
| Northern Iowa | 70 |

| Campus-site game (B1G+); November 18 |
| Chicago State | 54 |
| Minnesota | 66 |

| Campus-site game (ACCNX); November 18 |
| Louisiana | 66 |
| Stanford | 93 |

| Campus-site game (B1G+); November 20 |
| Chicago State | 54 |
| Iowa | 93 |

| Campus-site game (MW Network); November 21 |
| Northwestern State | 72 |
| Grand Canyon | 85 |

| Campus-site game (ESPN+); November 21 |
| UC Davis | 79 |
| Colorado | 95 |

| Campus-site game (MW Network); November 21 |
| Southern | 66 |
| San Jose State | 80 |

| Campus-site game (MW Network); November 21 |
| Austin Peay | 75 |
| Tulsa | 84 |

| Campus-site game (ESPN+); November 21 |
| Northern Illinois | 76 |
| Loyola Chicago | 59 |

| Campus-site game (ESPN+); November 21 |
| Purdue Fort Wayne | 60 |
| Saint Louis | 91 |

| Campus-site game (ESPN+); November 21 |
| Louisiana | 43 |
| Santa Clara | 80 |

| Campus-site game (ESPN+); November 24 |
| Louisiana | 56 |
| UC Davis | 77 |

| Campus-site game (ESPN+); November 25 |
| Northern Illinois | 59 |
| Austin Peay | 77 |

| Campus-site game (ESPN+); November 25 |
| Chicago State | 77 |
| Purdue Fort Wayne | 90 |

| Campus-site game (ESPN+); November 29 |
| Southern | 75 |
| Northwestern State | 73 |

=== Acrisure Classic ===
Game recaps:

Third Place truTV; November 26
Ole Miss | 74
Utah | 85

Semifinals; CBSSN; November 25
Ole Miss | 69
Iowa | 74
Utah | 58
Grand Canyon | 68

Championship truTV; November 26
Iowa | 59
Grand Canyon | 46

=== Acrisure Holiday Classic ===
Game recaps:

Third Place truTV; November 28
San Francisco | 65
Nevada | 81

Semifinals; CBSSN; November 27
San Francisco | 69
Colorado | 79
Washington | 83
Nevada | 66

Championship truTV; November 28
Colorado | 81
Washington | 68

=== Acrisure Holiday Invitational ===
Game recaps:

Third Place truTV; November 28
San Jose State | 63
Loyola Chicago | 51

Semifinals; CBSSN; November 27
San Jose State | 51
Tulsa | 81
Northern Iowa | 72
Loyola Chicago | 51

Championship truTV; November 28
Tulsa | 63
Northern Iowa | 60

=== Acrisure Invitational ===
Game recaps:

Third Place truTV; November 28
Santa Clara | 86
Minnesota | 75

Semifinals; CBSSN; November 27
Saint Louis | 71
Santa Clara | 70
Minnesota | 68
Stanford | 72

Championship truTV; November 28
Saint Louis | 77
Stanford | 78

=== Acrisure Series solo games first bracket ===
California Baptist met San Diego in the first of the 2025 Acrisure Series solo games. Each team also played home games against UC Riverside and Grambling State. UC Riverside hosted Grambling State, creating an MTE in which each team played three games.

==== On-campus games ====
Game recaps:

Home teams listed second.

| Campus-site game (ESPN+); November 18 |
| UC Riverside | 57 |
| California Baptist | 80 |

| Campus-site game (ESPN+); November 19 |
| Grambling State | 68 |
| San Diego | 78 |

| Campus-site game (ESPN+); November 21 |
| Grambling State | 59 |
| California Baptist | 72 |

| Campus-site game (ESPN+); November 21 |
| UC Riverside | 85 |
| San Diego | 71 |

| Campus-site game (ESPN+); November 24 |
| Grambling State | 74 |
| UC Riverside | 83 |

==== Acrisure Arena solo game ====
Game recap:

| Solo game CBSSN; November 25 |
| San Diego | 61 |
| California Baptist | 76 |

=== Acrisure Series solo games second bracket ===
Fresno State met Pepperdine in the second of the 2025 Acrisure Series solo games. Each team also played home games against New Orleans and Stephen F. Austin. New Orleans and Stephen F. Austin did not play each other. Therefore, the qualifying MTE includes only the on-campus games, and the game at Acrisure Arena between Fresno State and Pepperdine was a regular-season neutral-site game. Each participating team played two qualifying MTE games.

==== On-campus games ====
Game recaps:

Home teams listed second.

| Campus-site game (ESPN+); November 18 |
| New Orleans | 79 |
| Pepperdine | 90 |

| Campus-site game (MW Network); November 18 |
| Stephen F. Austin | 78 |
| Fresno State | 80 |

| Campus-site game (ESPN+); November 21 |
| Stephen F. Austin | 63 |
| Pepperdine | 60 |

| Campus-site game (MW Network); November 21 |
| New Orleans | 76 |
| Fresno State | 85 |

==== Acrisure Arena solo game ====
Game recap:

| Solo game CBSSN; November 26 |
| Pepperdine | 53 |
| Fresno State | 76 |

== 2024 men's event ==
The 2024 event included 22 teams, 14 of which played games at Acrisure Arena in the Acrisure Classic, the Acrisure Holiday Invitational, the Acrisure Invitational and the Acrisure Series Showcase. The remaining eight teams participated only in on-campus games. Stanford met Grand Canyon in the only Acrisure Series Showcase game played at Acrisure Arena. The other three brackets each included four teams playing at the neutral site and two teams playing on-campus games.

=== Acrisure Classic ===
Five campus-site games were followed by a four-team bracket at Acrisure Arena.

==== Campus-site games ====
Game recaps:

Home teams listed second.

| Campus-site game (ESPN+); November 20 |
| Cal Poly | 89 |
| Arizona State | 93 |

| Campus-site game (MW Network); November 21 |
| Grambling State | 58 |
| New Mexico | 80 |

| Campus-site game (ESPN+); November 23 |
| Cal Poly | 66 |
| Saint Mary's | 80 |

| Campus-site game (B1G+); November 24 |
| Grambling State | 69 |
| USC | 80 |

| Campus-site game (ESPN+); November 26 |
| Grambling State | 79 |
| Cal Poly | 82 |

==== Neutral-site games ====
All four games at Acrisure Arena were broadcast on truTV.

Game recaps:

Third Place; November 29
USC | 73
New Mexico | 83

Semifinals; November 28
USC | 36
Saint Mary's | 71
Arizona State | 85
New Mexico | 82

Championship; November 29
Saint Mary's | 64
Arizona State | 68

=== Acrisure Holiday Invitational ===
Five campus-site games were followed by a four-team bracket at Acrisure Arena.

==== Campus-site games ====
Game recaps:

Home teams listed second.

| Campus-site game (ACCNX); November 18 |
| Prairie View A&M | 69 |
| SMU | 110 |

| Campus-site game (ESPN+); November 18 |
| Northern Colorado | 69 |
| Washington State | 83 |

| Campus-site game (ESPN+); November 20 |
| Northern Colorado | 79 |
| California Baptist | 68 |

| Campus-site game (MW Network); November 20 |
| Prairie View A&M | 83 |
| Fresno State | 94 |

| Campus-site game (ESPN+); November 23 |
| Prairie View A&M | 98 |
| Northern Colorado | 114 |

==== Neutral-site games ====
All four games at Acrisure Arena were broadcast on truTV.

Game recaps:

Third Place; November 27
California Baptist | 86^{2OT}
Fresno State | 81

Semifinals; November 26
SMU | 79
California Baptist | 77
Washington State | 84
Fresno State | 73

Championship; November 27
SMU | 77
Washington State | 60

=== Acrisure Invitational ===
Five campus-site games were followed by a four-team bracket at Acrisure Arena.

==== Campus-site games ====
Game recaps:

Home teams listed second.

| Campus-site game (ESPN+); November 19 |
| Alcorn State | 48 |
| TCU | 71 |

| Campus-site game (ESPN+); November 19 |
| UC Riverside | 54 |
| Santa Clara | 96 |

| Campus-site game (MW Network); November 22 |
| UC Riverside | 77^{OT} |
| Colorado State | 75 |

| Campus-site game (B1G+); November 22 |
| Alcorn State | 60 |
| Washington | 77 |

| Campus-site game (ESPN+); November 24 |
| Alcorn State | 52 |
| UC Riverside | 69 |

==== Neutral-site games ====
All four games at Acrisure Arena were broadcast on truTV.

Game recaps:

Third Place; November 29
TCU | 72
Colorado State | 76^{OT}

Semifinals; November 28
TCU | 52
Santa Clara | 69
Washington | 73
Colorado State | 67

Championship; November 29
Santa Clara | 69
Washington | 76

=== Acrisure Series Showcase ===
Stanford and Grand Canyon met in the Acrisure Series Showcase at Acrisure Arena. In addition, each team hosted both UC Davis and Norfolk State in on-campus games. UC Davis hosted Norfolk State to give each participating team three games.

==== Campus-site games ====
Game recaps:

Home teams listed second.

| Campus-site game (ACCNX); November 17 |
| UC Davis | 65 |
| Stanford | 79 |

| Campus-site game (ACCNX); November 20 |
| Norfolk State | 63 |
| Stanford | 70 |

| Campus-site game (ESPN+); November 20 |
| UC Davis | 75 |
| Grand Canyon | 68 |

| Campus-site game (ESPN+); November 22 |
| Norfolk State | 73 |
| Grand Canyon | 91 |

| Campus-site game (ESPN+); November 25 |
| Norfolk State | 76 |
| UC Davis | 55 |

==== Neutral-site game ====
Game recap:

| Showcase truTV; November 26 |
| Stanford | 71 |
| Grand Canyon | 78 |

== 2024 women's event ==
The inaugural women's Acrisure Classic was held in 2024.

=== Acrisure Classic ===
All four games were broadcast on truTV.

Game recaps:

Third Place; November 27
California | 74
Arizona | 62

Semifinals; November 26
California | 72
Michigan State | 78
Arizona | 60
Vanderbilt | 71

Championship; November 27
Michigan State | 78
Vanderbilt | 70

== 2023 ==
The 2023 event comprised the Acrisure Classic and the Acrisure Invitational. Four teams participated in the Acrisure Classic, two of which played on-campus games only; the other two played a stand-alone game at Acrisure Arena. The Acrisure Invitational included four teams, each of which played two games at Acrisure Arena.

=== Acrisure Classic ===
Logo of inaugural event.

The 2023 Acrisure Classic featured nationally ranked Arizona and Michigan State. On-campus games were hosted by the team listed second below. Three games were played at campus sites in the days leading up to Thanksgiving, and the event culminated with a nationally televised game on Thanksgiving Day.

==== On-campus games ====
Game recaps:

| On-campus game November 19 (BTN) |
| Alcorn State | 49 |
| No. 18 Michigan State | 81 |

| On-campus game November 19 (P12N) |
| UT Arlington | 56 |
| No. 3 Arizona | 101 |

| On-campus game November 22 (ESPN+) |
| Alcorn State | 69 |
| UT Arlington | 82 |

==== Acrisure Arena game ====
Game recap:

| November 23 (Fox) |
| No. 21 Michigan State | 68 |
| No. 3 Arizona | 74 |

=== Acrisure Invitational ===
Logo of inaugural event.

The 2023 Acrisure Invitational featured Arkansas State, Hawaii, San Diego and UT Rio Grande Valley.

Game recaps:

Third Place; November 25
UT Rio Grande Valley | 58
Arkansas State | 75

Semifinals; November 24
UT Rio Grande Valley | 57
Hawaii | 76
San Diego | 71
Arkansas State | 57

Championship; November 25
Hawaii | 77
San Diego | 66
