= 2025–26 North Texas Mean Green men's basketball team =

American college basketball season

2025–26 North Texas Mean Green men's basketball
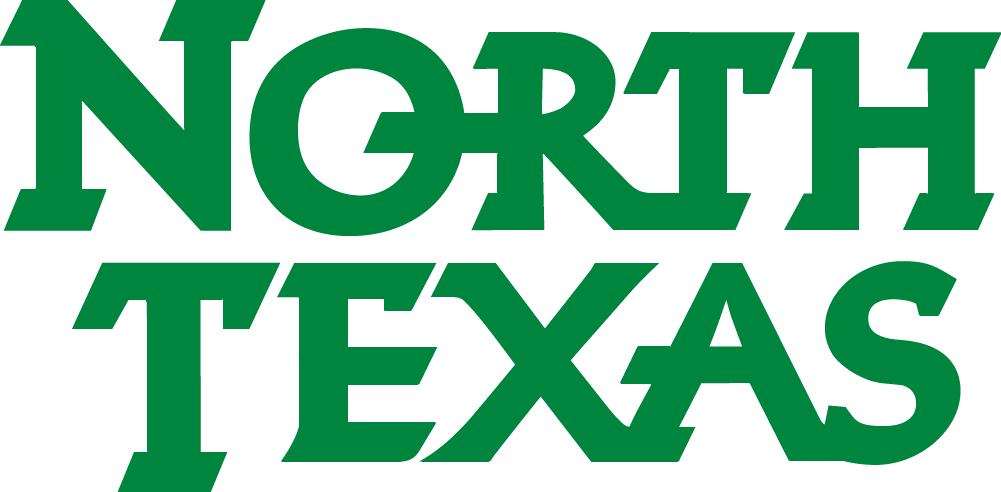
- Conference: American Conference
- Record: 19–14 (9–9 American)
- Head coach: Daniyal Robinson (1st season)
- Assistant coaches: Kwanza Johnson; Steve Payne; Jay Shunnar; Deshon Parker; Mo Ba
- Home arena: The Super Pit

2025–26 American Conference men's basketball standings
	Conf.				Overall
Team	W		L	PCT	W		L	PCT
South Florida †	15	–	3	.833	25	–	9	.735
Wichita State	13	–	5	.722	24	–	12	.667
Tulsa	13	–	5	.722	30	–	8	.789
UAB	11	–	7	.611	20	–	12	.625
Charlotte	9	–	9	.500	17	–	17	.500
North Texas	9	–	9	.500	19	–	14	.576
Florida Atlantic	9	–	9	.500	18	–	15	.545
Memphis	8	–	10	.444	13	–	19	.406
Tulane	8	–	10	.444	18	–	15	.545
Temple	8	–	10	.444	16	–	16	.500
Rice	7	–	11	.389	13	–	18	.419
East Carolina	6	–	12	.333	11	–	20	.355
UTSA	1	–	17	.056	5	–	25	.167
† 2026 American tournament winner

The 2025–26 North Texas Mean Green men's basketball team represented the University of North Texas during the 2025–26 NCAA Division I men's basketball season. The team was led by first-year head coach Daniyal Robinson, and played their home games at UNT Coliseum in Denton, Texas as members of the American Conference.

== Previous season ==
The Mean Green finished the 2024–25 season 27–9, 14–4 in AAC play, to finish in second place. They defeated Tulsa in the quarterfinals of the AAC tournament before losing to UAB in the semifinals. They received an at-large bid to the National Invitation Tournament. They advanced to the semifinals of the NIT, defeating Furman, Arkansas State, and Oklahoma State, before losing to UC Irvine.

In March, Mean Green head coach Ross Hodge was hired as the new head coach of West Virginia. Hodge finished out the season with the Mean Green before moving to Morgantown. A few days after Hodge's move was announced, the Mean Green announced the hiring of Daniyal Robinson from Cleveland State as the team's new head coach. The assistant coaching staff also saw large turnover, with all five assistants new to the program this season.

== Offseason ==
=== Departures ===
Name	Number	Pos.	Height	Weight	Year	Hometown	Reason for departure
Tyran Mason	0	G	6 ft 6 in (1.98 m)	195 lb (88 kg)	Freshman	Vichy, France	Transferred to UT Arlington
Latrell Jossell	1	G	6 ft 1 in (1.85 m)	175 lb (79 kg)	Senior	Chicago, IL	Graduated
Johnathan Massie	2	G	6 ft 6 in (1.98 m)	195 lb (88 kg)	Senior	Houston, TX	Graduated
Jasper Floyd	3	G	6 ft 3 in (1.91 m)	195 lb (88 kg)	Senior	Tampa, FL	Transferred to West Virginia
Alex Cotton	4	G	6 ft 5 in (1.96 m)	200 lb (91 kg)	Sophomore	Carrollton, TX	Transferred to Howard
Rondel Walker	5	G	6 ft 5 in (1.96 m)	185 lb (84 kg)	Senior	Midwest City, OK	Graduated
Brenen Lorient	6	G	6 ft 9 in (2.06 m)	215 lb (98 kg)	Junior	Ocala, FL	Transferred to West Virginia
Baron Smith Jr.	7	F	6 ft 9 in (2.06 m)	220 lb (100 kg)	Freshman	Haltom City, TX	Transferred to Oral Roberts
Grant Newell	8	F	6 ft 9 in (2.06 m)	220 lb (100 kg)	Junior	Chicago, IL	Transferred to Western Kentucky
Atin Wright	10	G	1	185 lb (84 kg)	Senior	Hawthorne, CA	Graduated
Brock Vice	11	C	10	240 lb (110 kg)	Redshirt Freshman	Memphis, TN	Transferred to Murray State
Ma'Syn Howell	13	G	1	180 lb (82 kg)	Redshirt Freshman	Inglewood, CA	Transferred to Oklahoma Christian
Moulaye Sissoko	14	F	9	245 lb (111 kg)	Redshirt Senior	Bamako, Mali	Graduated
Grayson Allo	20	G	5	185 lb (84 kg)	Redshirt Freshman	Carrollton, TX	
Matthew Stone	23	G	4	200 lb (91 kg)	Senior	Kingfisher, OK	Graduated

=== Incoming transfers ===
Name	Number	Pos.	Height	Weight	Year	Hometown	Previous school
Demarion Watson	0	G	6 ft 7 in (2.01 m)	225 lb (102 kg)	Senior	Maple Grove, MN	Iowa State
Will McClendon	1	G	6 ft 3 in (1.91 m)	195 lb (88 kg)	Senior	Sacramento, CA	San Jose State
Cahmai Crosby	2	G	6 ft 3 in (1.91 m)		Junior	Kansas City, KS	Kilgore College
Je'Shawn Stevenson	4	G	6 ft 2 in (1.88 m)	200 lb (91 kg)	Sophomore	Chicago, IL	Cleveland State
David Terrell Jr.	5	G	6 ft 4 in (1.93 m)	185 lb (84 kg)	Junior	Dallas, TX	UTEP
Josiah Shackleford	8	F	6 ft 9 in (2.06 m)	225 lb (102 kg)	Senior	Greenville, NC	Georgia Southwestern
Cole Franklin	10	G	6 ft 4 in (1.93 m)	195 lb (88 kg)	Junior	DeSoto, TX	Cleveland State
Dylan Arnett	12	F	6 ft 9 in (2.06 m)	240 lb (110 kg)	Senior	Chicago, IL	Cleveland State
Reece Robinson	15	F	6 ft 8 in (2.03 m)	223 lb (101 kg)	Sophomore	Cleveland, OH	Cleveland State
Buddy Hammer Jr.	23	F	6 ft 7 in (2.01 m)	210 lb (95 kg)	Junior	Westville, OK	Northeastern Oklahoma

=== 2025 recruiting class ===
College recruiting
Name	Hometown	School	Height	Weight	Commit date
DeAndre Thomas; PF	Allen, TX	Allen High School	6 ft 7 in (2.01 m)	210 lb (95 kg)	Sep 8, 2024
DeAndre Thomas; PF	Recruit ratings: Rivals: 247Sports: (NR)				
EJ Horton; G	Mono, ON	Orangeville Prep	6 ft 3 in (1.91 m)	N/A	Apr 8, 2025
EJ Horton; G	Recruit ratings: Rivals: 247Sports: (NR)				
Curtis Stinson Jr. PG	Bronx, NY	Western Reserve Academy (OH)	6 ft 4 in (1.93 m)	180 lb (82 kg)	Apr 8, 2025
Curtis Stinson Jr. PG	Recruit ratings: Rivals: 247Sports: (NR)				
Overall recruit ranking:
Note: In many cases, Scout, Rivals, 247Sports, On3, and ESPN may conflict in their listings of height and weight.; In these cases, the average was taken. ESPN grades are on a 100-point scale.; Sources: "2025 Team Ranking". Rivals.

== Roster ==
2025–26 North Texas Mean Green men's basketball team
Players
Coaches

Pos.	#	Name	Height	Weight	Year	Previous school	Hometown
G	0	Demarion Watson	6 ft 7 in (2.01 m)	225 lb (102 kg)	Sr	Totino-Grace HS; Iowa State	Maple Grove, MN
G	1	Will McClendon	6 ft 3 in (1.91 m)	195 lb (88 kg)	Sr	Bishop Gorman HS; San Jose State	Sacramento, CA
G	2	Johnathan Massie	6 ft 6 in (1.98 m)	195 lb (88 kg)	Sr	Legacy the School of Sport Sciences; Longwood	Houston, TX
G	4	Je'Shawn Stevenson	6 ft 2 in (1.88 m)	200 lb (91 kg)	So	Lindblom HS; Cleveland State	Chicago, IL
G	5	David Terrell Jr.	6 ft 4 in (1.93 m)	185 lb (84 kg)	Jr	Mansfield Summit HS; UTEP	Dallas, TX
G	6	EJ Horton	6 ft 3 in (1.91 m)	—	Fr	Orangeville Academy	Chicago, IL
F	8	Josiah Shackleford	6 ft 9 in (2.06 m)	225 lb (102 kg)	Sr	Word of God Christian Academy; Georgia Southwestern	Greenville, NC
G	10	Cole Franklin	6 ft 4 in (1.93 m)	195 lb (88 kg)	Jr	DeSoto HS; Cleveland State	DeSoto, TX
G	11	Curtis Stinson Jr	6 ft 5 in (1.96 m)	—	Fr	Western Reserve Academy	Bronx, NY
F	12	Dylan Arnett	6 ft 9 in (2.06 m)	240 lb (109 kg)	Sr	DePaul College Prep; Cleveland State	Chicago, IL
F	15	Reece Robinson	6 ft 8 in (2.03 m)	223 lb (101 kg)	So	St. Ignatius HS; Cleveland State	Cleveland, OH
F	23	Buddy Hammer Jr.	6 ft 7 in (2.01 m)	210 lb (95 kg)	Jr	Westville HS	Westville, OK; Northeastern Oklahoma

Head coach

- Daniyal Robinson (Little Rock)

Assistant coach(es)

- Kwanza Johnson (Tulsa)
- Steve Payne (Union)
- Jay Shunnar (Michigan)
- Deshon Parker (Cleveland State)
- Mo Ba (Eastern Michigan)

Legend

- (C) Team captain
- (S) Suspended
- (I) Ineligible
- (W) Walk-on
- Injured
- Current redshirt

Roster

== Schedule and results ==
Date time, TV	Rank^{#}	Opponent^{#}	Result	Record	High points	High rebounds	High assists	Site (attendance) city, state
Exhibition
October 29, 2025*; 7:00 p.m.		Louisiana	W 61–47	–	12 – Stevenson	5 – Stevenson	5 – McClendon	The Super Pit; Denton, TX
Non-conference regular season
November 3, 2025*; 7:30 p.m., ESPN+		New Mexico Highlands	W 88−54	1−0	18 – Stevenson	7 – McClendon	6 – McClendon	The Super Pit (4,684); Denton, TX
November 6, 2025*; 7:00 p.m., ESPN+		Northwestern State	W 80−53	2−0	13 – Tied	5 – Watson	6 – Terrell Jr.	The Super Pit (3,030); Denton, TX
November 9, 2025*; 4:00 p.m., Marquee/ESPN+		vs. Loyola Chicago	W 64–62	3–0	23 – Stevenson	6 – Robinson	4 – Terrell Jr.	Now Arena (789); Hoffman Estates, IL
November 12, 2025*; 8:30 p.m., ESPN+		at Oregon State	L 64–66	3–1	16 – McClendon	12 – Arnett	7 – Terrell Jr.	Gill Coliseum (2,561); Corvallis, OR
November 14, 2025*; 9:00 p.m., ESPN+		at Saint Mary's	L 49–80	3–2	16 – Stevenson	6 – Robinson	4 – Stinson	University Credit Union Pavilion (3,392); Moraga, CA
November 20, 2025*; 7:00 p.m., ESPN+		Central Arkansas	W 74–56	4–2	15 – Shackleford	9 – Robinson	4 – Terrell Jr.	The Super Pit (2,743); Denton, TX
November 25, 2025*; 7:00 p.m., ESPN+		Eastern Washington	W 79–71 ^{OT}	5–2	26 – Stevenson	11 – Arnett	4 – Terrell Jr.	The Super Pit (2,591); Denton, TX
November 30, 2025*; 3:00 p.m., ESPN+		Prairie View A&M	W 72−69	6−2	23 – Stevenson	13 – Arnett	9 – Terrell Jr.	The Super Pit (2,658); Denton, TX
December 2, 2025*; 7:00 p.m., ESPN+		Houston Christian	W 77−75	7−2	16 – Robinson	9 – Robinson	10 – Terrell Jr.	The Super Pit (2,582); Denton, TX
December 7, 2025*; 4:30 p.m., ESPN+		vs. TCU; 2025 USLBM Coast to Coast Challenge	L 55−65	7−3	16 – Terrell Jr.	4 – Tied	4 – Arnett	Dickies Arena; Fort Worth, TX
December 14, 2025*; 4:30 p.m., ESPN+		at South Alabama	W 58−57	8−3	22 – Stevenson	10 – Arnett	6 – Terrell Jr.	Mitchell Center (1,804); Mobile, AL
December 17, 2025*; 8:00 p.m., BallerTV		vs. Santa Clara	L 60−63	8−4	16 – Terrell Jr.	8 – Franklin	4 – Terrell Jr.	Kaiser Permanente Arena (120); Santa Cruz, CA
December 22, 2025*; 1:00 p.m., ESPN+		University of Science and Arts (OK)	W 109−56	9−4	16 – Tied	8 – Shackleford	4 – Tied	The Super Pit (2,304); Denton, TX
American regular season
December 31, 2025; 3:00 p.m., ESPN2		at Memphis	L 48−57	9−5 (0−1)	20 – Stevenson	6 – Stevenson	3 – Franklin	FedEx Forum (9,685); Memphis, TN
January 4, 2026; 3:00 p.m., ESPN+		Tulsa	W 72–67	10–5 (1–1)	21 – Stevenson	5 – Tied	4 – Terrell Jr.	The Super Pit (3,026); Denton, TX
January 7, 2026; 7:00 p.m., ESPN+		South Florida	L 70–74	10–6 (1–2)	21 – Stevenson	5 – Tied	5 – Terrell Jr.	The Super Pit (2,645); Denton, TX
January 11, 2026; 2:00 p.m., ESPNU		at Wichita State	L 67–78	10–7 (1–3)	21 – Terrell Jr.	5 – Arnett	5 – Terrell Jr.	Charles Koch Arena (5,549); Wichita, KS
January 18, 2026; 4:00 p.m., ESPN2		at Tulane	W 71–63	11–7 (2–3)	19 – Terrell Jr.	9 – Robinson	7 – Terrell Jr.	Devlin Fieldhouse (1,307); New Orleans, LA
January 21, 2026; 7:00 p.m., ESPN+		UTSA	W 81–62	12–7 (3–3)	27 – Stevenson	10 – Tied	5 – Terrell Jr.	The Super Pit (3,104); Denton, TX
January 24, 2026; 12:00 p.m., ESPN+		East Carolina	L 59–63	12–8 (3–4)	18 – Stevenson	5 – Tied	3 – Terrell Jr.	The Super Pit (2,420); Denton, TX
January 28, 2026; 7:00 p.m., ESPN+		at Tulsa	L 66–82	12–9 (3–5)	19 – Stevenson	7 – Robinson	3 – Terrell Jr.	Reynolds Center (3,175); Tulsa, OK
January 31, 2026; 7:00 p.m., ESPNU		UAB	L 68–72	12–10 (3–6)	21 – Stevenson	5 – Tied	5 – Terrell Jr.	The Super Pit (3,905); Denton, TX
February 4, 2026; 7:00 p.m., ESPN+		at Rice	L 83–86 ^{2OT}	12–11 (3–7)	19 – Franklin	6 – Tied	3 – Franklin	Tudor Fieldhouse (1,314); Houston, TX
February 7, 2026; 1:00 p.m., ESPN+		at UTSA	W 81–58	13–11 (4–7)	21 – Franklin	12 – Arnett	6 – Tied	Convocation Center (1,189); San Antonio, TX
February 12, 2026; 8:00 p.m., ESPN		Memphis	W 76−69	14−11 (5−7)	16 – Stevenson	9 – Franklin	4 – Terrell Jr.	The Super Pit (3,395); Denton, TX
February 15, 2026; 1:00 p.m., ESPN+		at Temple	W 65−62	15−11 (6−7)	14 – Arnett	6 – Tied	3 – Stevenson	Liacouras Center (3,685); Philadelphia, PA
February 19, 2026; 8:00 p.m., ESPN2		Tulane	W 77–71	15–12 (6–8)	21 – Terrell Jr.	7 – Stevenson	6 – Terrell Jr.	The Super Pit (3,514); Denton, TX
February 22, 2026; 3:00 p.m., ESPNU		Florida Atlantic	W 73–72	16–12 (7–8)	29 – Stevenson	9 – Franklin	6 – Terrell Jr.	The Super Pit (3,237); Denton, TX
February 25, 2026; 6:00 p.m., ESPN+		at Charlotte	L 79–80	16–13 (7–9)	23 – Robinson	6 – Franklin	7 – Terrell Jr.	Dale F. Halton Arena (2,509); Charlotte, NC
March 1, 2026; 11:00 a.m., ESPNU		at UAB	W 62–58	17–13 (8–9)	17 – Terrell Jr.	8 – Hammer Jr.	3 – Tied	Bartow Arena (3,537); Birmingham, AL
March 4, 2026; 7:00 p.m., ESPN+		Rice	W 62–58	18–13 (9–9)	15 – Tied	10 – Shackleford	3 – Terrell Jr.	The Super Pit (2,775); Denton, TX
American tournament
March 12, 2026; 8:30 p.m., ESPNU	(6)	vs. (7) Florida Atlantic; Second Round	W 74–70	19–13	24 – Stevenson	8 – Hammer Jr.	7 – Terrell Jr.	Legacy Arena; Birmingham, AL
March 13, 2026; 2:00 p.m., ESPN2	(6)	vs. (3) Tulsa; Quarterfinals	L 84–90 ^{3OT}	19–14	21 – Stevenson	8 – Arnett	5 – Terrell Jr.	Legacy Arena; Birmingham, AL
*Non-conference game. ^{#}Rankings from AP poll. (#) Tournament seedings in parentheses. All times are in Central.

== See also ==
- 2025–26 North Texas Mean Green women's basketball team
