= 2025–26 Tulsa Golden Hurricane men's basketball team =

American college basketball season

2025–26 Tulsa Golden Hurricane men's basketball

Acrisure Holiday Invitational champions

NIT, Runners-up
- Conference: American Conference
- Record: 30–8 (13–5 American)
- Head coach: Eric Konkol (4th season)
- Assistant coaches: Duffy Conroy; Desmond Haymon; Yaphett King
- Home arena: Reynolds Center

2025–26 American Conference men's basketball standings
	Conf.				Overall
Team	W		L	PCT	W		L	PCT
South Florida †	15	–	3	.833	25	–	9	.735
Wichita State	13	–	5	.722	24	–	12	.667
Tulsa	13	–	5	.722	30	–	8	.789
UAB	11	–	7	.611	20	–	12	.625
Charlotte	9	–	9	.500	17	–	17	.500
North Texas	9	–	9	.500	19	–	14	.576
Florida Atlantic	9	–	9	.500	18	–	15	.545
Memphis	8	–	10	.444	13	–	19	.406
Tulane	8	–	10	.444	18	–	15	.545
Temple	8	–	10	.444	16	–	16	.500
Rice	7	–	11	.389	13	–	18	.419
East Carolina	6	–	12	.333	11	–	20	.355
UTSA	1	–	17	.056	5	–	25	.167
† 2026 American tournament winner

The 2025–26 Tulsa Golden Hurricane men's basketball team represented the University of Tulsa during the 2025–26 NCAA Division I men's basketball season. The Golden Hurricane were led by fourth-year head coach Eric Konkol, and played their home games at the Reynolds Center in Tulsa, Oklahoma as members of the American Conference.

== Previous season ==
The Golden Hurricane finished the 2024–25 season 13–20, 6–12 in AAC play to finish in a tie for ninth place. As a No. 10 seed in the AAC tournament, they beat Temple in the second round of the conference tournament before losing to North Texas in the quarterfinals.

== Roster ==
2025–26 Tulsa Golden Hurricane men's basketball team
Players
Coaches

Pos.	#	Name	Height	Weight	Year	Previous school	Hometown
G	0	Ade Popoola	6 ft 5 in (1.96 m)	200 lb (91 kg)	Jr	Parkway North HS; Moberly Area CC	St. Louis, MO
G	2	Jaylen Lawal	6 ft 3 in (1.91 m)	195 lb (88 kg)	Fr	iSchool of Lewisville	Plano, TX
G	4	Myles Rigsby	6 ft 6 in (1.98 m)	190 lb (86 kg)	Jr	O.D. Wyatt HS; Troy	Ft. Worth, TX
F	6	Romad Dean	6 ft 7 in (2.01 m)	210 lb (95 kg)	Sr	Crestwood Prep; Fordham	Freeport, The Bahamas
G	7	Cal Conroy	6 ft 2 in (1.88 m)	168 lb (76 kg)	So	Bishop Kelley HS	Tulsa, OK
G	8	Leon Sifferlin	6 ft 6 in (1.98 m)	200 lb (91 kg)	Fr	Bourg-en-Bresse, France
F	9	Tyler Behrend	6 ft 10 in (2.08 m)	220 lb (100 kg)	Jr	Valley Lutheran HS; Olympic College	Cincinnati, OH
G	10	Tylen Riley	6 ft 3 in (1.91 m)	190 lb (86 kg)	Jr	Durango HS; California Baptist	Las Vegas, NV
G	11	Terrance Ford Jr.	6 ft 1 in (1.85 m)	177 lb (80 kg)	Jr	Victory Rock Prep; Arkansas State	Chicago, IL
G	14	Miles Barnstable	6 ft 2 in (1.88 m)	180 lb (82 kg)	Sr	Howards Grove HS; St. Thomas	Sheboygan, WI
F	15	KJ Martin Jr.	6 ft 8 in (2.03 m)	225 lb (102 kg)	Fr	The Rock School	Tampa, FL
F	23	David Green	6 ft 7 in (2.01 m)	225 lb (102 kg)		Ocoee HS; Rhode Island	Apopka, FL
G	33	Carter Benton	6 ft 4 in (1.93 m)	205 lb (93 kg)	So	Holland Hall	Tulsa, OK
F	35	Ian Smikle	6 ft 8 in (2.03 m)	242 lb (110 kg)	So	Suncoast Community HS	West Palm Beach, FL
C	45	Doryan Onwuchekwa	6 ft 11 in (2.11 m)	240 lb (109 kg)	So	Faith Family Academy of Oak Cliff; Georgia Tech	Dallas, TX

Head coach

- Eric Konkol (UW–Eau Claire)

Assistant coach(es)

- Duffy Conroy (St. Ambrose)
- Desmond Haymon (Stephen F. Austin)
- Yaphett King (Cal State Fullerton)
- Josh Wolfe

Legend

- (C) Team captain
- (S) Suspended
- (I) Ineligible
- (W) Walk-on
- Injured
- Current redshirt

Roster
Last update: November 14, 2025

== Schedule and results ==
Date time, TV	Rank^{#}	Opponent^{#}	Result	Record	High points	High rebounds	High assists	Site (attendance) city, state
Exhibition
October 28, 2025*; 7:00 p.m.		East Central	W 94–56	–	17 – Riley	7 – Tied	5 – Riley	Reynolds Center (2,188); Tulsa, OK
Non-conference regular season
November 3, 2025*; 7:00 p.m., ESPN+		Oklahoma Christian	W 100–57	1–0	15 – Tied	9 – Tied	7 – Sifferlin	Reynolds Center (2,621); Tulsa, OK
November 7, 2025*; 5:00 p.m., CBSSN		vs. Rhode Island; Veterans Classic	W 82–65	2–0	14 – Green	6 – Dean	4 – Tied	Alumni Hall; Annapolis, MD
November 12, 2025*; 7:00 p.m., KGEB		at Oral Roberts; Mayor's Cup	W 88–87	3–0	21 – Tied	7 – Green	3 – Tied	Mabee Center (5,467); Tulsa, OK
November 17, 2025*; 7:00 p.m., ESPN+		at Kansas State	L 83–84	3–1	18 – Barnstable	9 – Barnstable	4 – Tied	Bramlage Coliseum (7,123); Manhattan, KS
November 21, 2025*; 7:00 p.m., ESPN+		Austin Peay	W 84–75	4–1	20 – Riley	8 – Green	4 – Tied	Reynolds Center (2,702); Tulsa, OK
November 25, 2025*; 12:30 p.m., CBSSN		vs. San Jose State; Acrisure Holiday Invitational semifinal	W 81–51	5–1	16 – Green	5 – Tied	7 – Riley	Acrisure Arena; Thousand Palms, CA
November 26, 2025*; 3:30 p.m., CBSSN		vs. Northern Iowa; Acrisure Holiday Invitational championship	W 63–60	6–1	13 – Riley	5 – Barnstable	3 – Tied	Acrisure Arena; Thousand Palms, CA
December 2, 2025*; 7:00 p.m., ESPN+		Manhattan Christian	W 111–60	7–1	18 – Barnstable	9 – Tied	5 – Tied	Reynolds Center (2,868); Tulsa, OK
December 6, 2025*; 2:00 p.m., ESPN+		Missouri State	W 98–74	8–1	17 – Green	7 – Behrend	5 – Popoola	Reynolds Center (2,979); Tulsa, OK
December 10, 2025*; 7:00 p.m., ESPN+		Arkansas–Pine Bluff	W 117–84	9–1	20 – Lawal	9 – Behrend	4 – Lawal	Reynolds Center (2,742); Tulsa, OK
December 13, 2026*; 2:00 p.m., UEN		vs. New Mexico State	W 83–70	10–1	29 – Riley	6 – Tied	5 – Riley	Comerica Center (1,342); Frisco, TX
December 19, 2025*; 6:30 p.m., ESPN+		at Western Kentucky	W 82–81	11–1	18 – Riley	5 – Lawal	4 – Tied	E. A. Diddle Arena (3,547); Bowling Green, KY
December 22, 2025*; 2:00 p.m., ESPN+		Denver	W 90–85	12–1	23 – Green	6 – Tied	4 – Riley	Reynolds Center (3,595); Tulsa, OK
American regular season
December 31, 2025; 1:00 p.m., ESPNU		Rice	W 97–48	13–1 (1–0)	25 – Lawal	9 – Green	6 – Popoola	Reynolds Center (3,306); Tulsa, OK
January 4, 2026; 3:00 p.m., ESPN+		at North Texas	L 67–72	13–2 (1–1)	19 – Green	5 – Barnstable	5 – Riley	The Super Pit (3,026); Denton, TX
January 10, 2026; 2:00 p.m., ESPN+		South Florida	L 78–93	13–3 (1–2)	34 – Green	8 – Green	4 – Barnstable	Reynolds Center (3,303); Tulsa, OK
January 14, 2026; 6:00 p.m., ESPN+		at Charlotte	W 86–74	14–3 (2–2)	21 – Green	8 – Behrend	4 – Riley	Dale F. Halton Arena (3,094); Charlotte, NC
January 18, 2026; 2:00 p.m., ESPN+		at UAB	W 99–77	15–3 (3–2)	26 – Green	7 – Tied	6 – Riley	Bartow Arena (4,143); Birmingham, AL
January 21, 2026; 7:00 p.m., ESPN+		Memphis	W 83–66	16–3 (4–2)	17 – Barnstable	8 – Riley	8 – Riley	Reynolds Center (4,071); Tulsa, OK
January 24, 2026; 3:30 p.m., ESPN+		at Rice	W 87–81	17–3 (5–2)	21 – Barnstable	6 – Behrend	2 – Tied	Tudor Fieldhouse (1,254); Houston, TX
January 28, 2026; 7:00 p.m., ESPN+		North Texas	W 82–66	18–3 (6–2)	20 – Riley	7 – Behrend	4 – Riley	Reynolds Center (3,175); Tulsa, OK
February 1, 2026; 1:00 p.m., ESPNU		Wichita State; Rivalry	W 93–83	19–3 (7–2)	30 – Riley	8 – Green	4 – Riley	Reynolds Center (5,109); Tulsa, OK
February 4, 2026; 6:00 p.m., ESPN+		at Florida Atlantic	W 78–76	20–3 (8–2)	27 – Green	8 – Popoola	3 – Tied	Eleanor R. Baldwin Arena (3,161); Boca Raton, FL
February 8, 2026; 11:00 a.m., ESPNU		at South Florida	L 74–80	20–4 (8–3)	24 – Popoola	8 – Popoola	6 – Riley	Yuengling Center (4,030); Tampa, FL
February 11, 2026; 7:00 p.m., ESPN+		UAB	L 63–68	20–5 (8–4)	15 – Tied	9 – Tied	5 – Riley	Reynolds Center (3,361); Tulsa, OK
February 14, 2026; 6:00 p.m., ESPN+		at Wichita State; Rivalry	L 77–81	20–6 (8–5)	21 – Riley	7 – Barnstable	2 – Tied	Charles Koch Arena (7,569); Wichita, KS
February 18, 2026; 7:00 p.m., ESPN+		Charlotte	W 79–74	21–6 (9–5)	25 – Barnstable	6 – Behrend	7 – Riley	Reynolds Center (3,256); Tulsa, OK
February 22, 2026; 3:00 p.m., ESPNEWS		UTSA	W 100–74	22–6 (10–5)	27 – Green	10 – Popoola	6 – Riley	Reynolds Center (3,618); Tulsa, OK
February 25, 2026; 6:30 p.m., ESPN+		at Tulane	W 90–56	23–6 (11–5)	19 – Green	8 – Behrend	8 – Riley	Devlin Fieldhouse (1,482); New Orleans, LA
March 5, 2026; 6:00 p.m., ESPNU		at East Carolina	W 93–66	24–6 (12–5)	16 – Riley	6 – Green	7 – Riley	Williams Arena (3,782); Greenville, NC
March 8, 2026; 2:00 p.m., ESPN+		Temple	W 78–76	25–6 (13–5)	22 – Green	6 – Tied	5 – Riley	Reynolds Center (5,152); Tulsa, OK
American tournament
March 13, 2026; 2:30 p.m., ESPN2	(3)	vs. (6) North Texas; Quarterfinal	W 90–84 ^{3OT}	26–6	26 – Riley	11 – Behrend	5 – Riley	Legacy Arena; Birmingham, AL
March 14, 2026; 4:30 p.m., ESPN2	(3)	vs. (2) Wichita State; Semifinal/Rivalry	L 68–81	26–7	18 – Riley	6 – Behrend	5 – Riley	Legacy Arena; Birmingham, AL
NIT
March 17, 2026; 8:00 p.m., ESPNU	(1 T)	Stephen F. Austin; First round	W 89–84 ^{OT}	27–7	24 – Lawal	18 – Behrend	3 – Riley	Reynolds Center (1,679); Tulsa, OK
March 22, 2026; 6:00 p.m., ESPNU	(1 T)	UNLV; Second round	W 77–66	28–7	16 – Tied	11 – Dean	6 – Riley	Reynolds Center (2,432); Tulsa, OK
March 24, 2026; 6:00 p.m., ESPN2	(1 T)	(3 T) Wichita State; Quarterfinal/Rivalry	W 83–79	29–7	24 – Barnstable	6 – Tied	6 – Riley	Reynolds Center (3,198); Tulsa, OK
April 2, 2026; 6:00 p.m., ESPN	(1 T)	vs. (1 AL) New Mexico; Semifinal	W 74–69	30–7	13 – Green	8 – Behrend	5 – Riley	Hinkle Fieldhouse (4,625); Indianapolis, IN
April 5, 2026; 7:00 p.m., ESPN2	(1 T)	vs. (1 AU) Auburn; Championship	L 86–92 ^{OT}	30–8	25 – Green	6 – Tied	3 – Riley	Gainbridge Fieldhouse (9,670); Indianapolis, IN
*Non-conference game. ^{#}Rankings from AP poll. (#) Tournament seedings in parentheses. T=Tulsa. AL=Albuquerque. AU=Auburn. All times are in Central.
