= Harry Miller (writer) =

British journalist and photographer

Harry Miller MBE (1923 – 5 October 1998) was a journalist, writer, photographer and naturalist who lived most of his life in Madras, India. He was a popularizer of wildlife, nature and science, with numerous articles in local newspapers including The Hindu and The Indian Express.

== Early life ==
Born as Harry Colin Miller in Swansea, Wales, he came from a poor Welsh family. He was a self-made man, who counted among his close friends the Dalai Lama, Sir Arthur C. Clarke, and Queen Frederica of the Hellenes. He was married to an Indian from an illustrious Tamil Brahmin family, Revati Parthasarathy. He lived and worked in India for about forty years for the Indian Express and also wrote for the National Geographic, and he was also a photographer. He had two children Nisha and Robin. Robin died in 1991. Nisha lives in Chennai and has one daughter Tara Top-Teagarden.
