= Henry Miller (lawyer) =

American lawyer (1931–2020)

Henry Miller (February 18, 1931 – April 16, 2020) was an American lawyer and jurist. He was a past president of the New York Bar Association, and the author of several books and articles on trial advocacy; he was known as an expert in trial lawyering.

== Early life and education ==
Miller was born in Brooklyn, the son of Henry A. and Anne Withers Miller, on February 18, 1931.

He attended St. John's College (class of 1952) and St. John's Law School (class of 1959).

== Career ==
Miller was the senior partner of the law firm of Clark, Gagliardi & Miller, P.C., where he practiced trial work starting in 1966. He was president of the Westchester Bar Association and the New York Bar Association, the largest voluntary bar association in the United States. He received many awards, including the lifetime achievement award from New York State Trial Lawyers Association in 2015.

Miller was rated by other lawyers as one of the top two trial attorneys in the Westchester County, New York, area. Among his notable cases was In re Joint Eastern & Southern Dist. Asbestos Litigation. He testified in favor of the Health Protection Act of 1987.

In 2010, Miller wrote and performed in All Too Human, a one man play about Clarence Darrow that toured in New York and New Jersey.

== Personal life ==
Miller was married to Helena McCarty Miller; they had five children and ten grandchildren.

He died on April 16, 2020, in Mamaroneck, New York, from the effects of COVID-19,
