= Daniyal Robinson =

American collegiate basketball player and coach (born 1976)

Current position
- Title: Head coach
- Team: North Texas
- Conference: AAC
- Record: 19–14 (.576)

Biographical details
- Born: April 28, 1976 (age 50); Rock Island, Illinois, U.S.

Playing career
- 1995–1996: Indian Hills CC
- 1996–1998: Arkansas–Little Rock
- Position: Forward

Coaching career (HC unless noted)
- 2003–2007: Illinois State (assistant)
- 2007–2008: Arkansas–Little Rock (assistant)
- 2008–2010: Iowa State (assistant)
- 2010–2013: Houston (assistant)
- 2013–2014: Loyola Chicago (assistant)
- 2014–2015: Loyola Chicago (assoc. HC)
- 2015–2022: Iowa State (assistant)
- 2022–2025: Cleveland State
- 2025–present: North Texas

Administrative career (AD unless noted)
- 2000–2003: Arkansas–Little Rock (admin. asst.)

Head coaching record
- Overall: 84–56 (.600)
- Tournaments: 3–3 (CBI); 5–3 (Horizon)

Harvey Daniyal Robinson (born April 28, 1976) is an American collegiate basketball coach who is currently the head men's basketball coach at North Texas. He previously served as the head coach at Cleveland State from 2022 to 2025. He played college basketball at Indian Hills Community College and the University of Arkansas–Little Rock.

== Early life and education ==
Robinson was born on April 28, 1976, is a native of Rock Island, Illinois, and played basketball at Rock Island High School. Robinson then attended Indian Hills Community College for two years, where he continued his basketball career, and subsequently played for the Little Rock Trojans men's basketball team from 1996 to 1998. A forward, Robinson averaged 4.2 points and 3.8 rebounds in two seasons with Little Rock.

== Assistant coaching career ==
Robinson remained on the UA–LR staff as an administrative assistant to head coach Porter Moser. In 2003, Robinson joined the coaching staff of the Illinois State Redbirds men's basketball team under Moser. Moser and three of his assistant coaches, including Robinson, were terminated in March 2007. During the 2007–2008 season, Robinson was an assistant coach at his alma mater, the University of Arkansas–Little Rock. Robinson became an assistant coach for the Iowa State Cyclones men's basketball team starting in the 2008–2009 season. From the 2010–2011 season, Robinson was an assistant coach for the Houston Cougars men's basketball program. In 2013, Robinson moved to the Loyola Ramblers men's basketball team, again working under Moser. Before the 2014–15 season began, Robinson was elevated to associate head coach. Robinson returned to Iowa State to work on head coach Steve Prohm's staff in 2015. When T. J. Otzelberger became head coach in 2021, Robinson was retained as an assistant coach.

== Head coaching career ==
In April 2022, Robinson was hired as head coach of the Cleveland State Vikings men's basketball program. Prior to the 2025–2026 season, Robinson was named head coach of the North Texas Mean Green men's basketball team.

== Recruiting and community outreach ==
During his first stint at Iowa State with head coach Greg McDermott, Robinson was responsible for recruiting players from Chicago and junior colleges. He continued recruiting from those areas in his second stint with Iowa State. Robinson became known for his recruiting ability. Following the deaths of Breonna Taylor and George Floyd in 2020, Robinson contacted fellow coaches across the Big 12 Conference. He and the Iowa State coaching staff began discussing several topics with Cyclones' men's basketball players over Zoom, including protests, demonstrations, and unrest that began as a result of these deaths. Following these discussions, the Big 12 Black Assistant Coaches Alliance was established.

== Personal life ==
Robinson's older brother David also played basketball for Rock Island High School, at Indian Hills, then later for the Quad City Thunder. Daniyal Robinson married Kim in 2003. The couple raised three children.

== Head coaching record ==
Record table
Season	Team	Overall	Conference	Standing	Postseason
Cleveland State Vikings (Horizon League) (2022–2025)
2022–23	Cleveland State	21–14	14–6	T–2nd	CBI First Round
2023–24	Cleveland State	21–15	11–9	T–7th	CBI Quarterfinals
2024–25	Cleveland State	23–13	14–6	T–2nd	CBI Runner-Up
Cleveland State:		65–42 (.607)	39–21 (.650)		
North Texas Mean Green (The American) (2025–present)
2025–26	North Texas	19–14	9–9	T–5th	
North Texas:		19–14 (.576)	9–9 (.500)		
Total:		84–56 (.600)			
National champion Postseason invitational champion Conference regular season champion Conference regular season and conference tournament champion Division regular season champion Division regular season and conference tournament champion Conference tournament champion
