= USCGC Harold Miller =

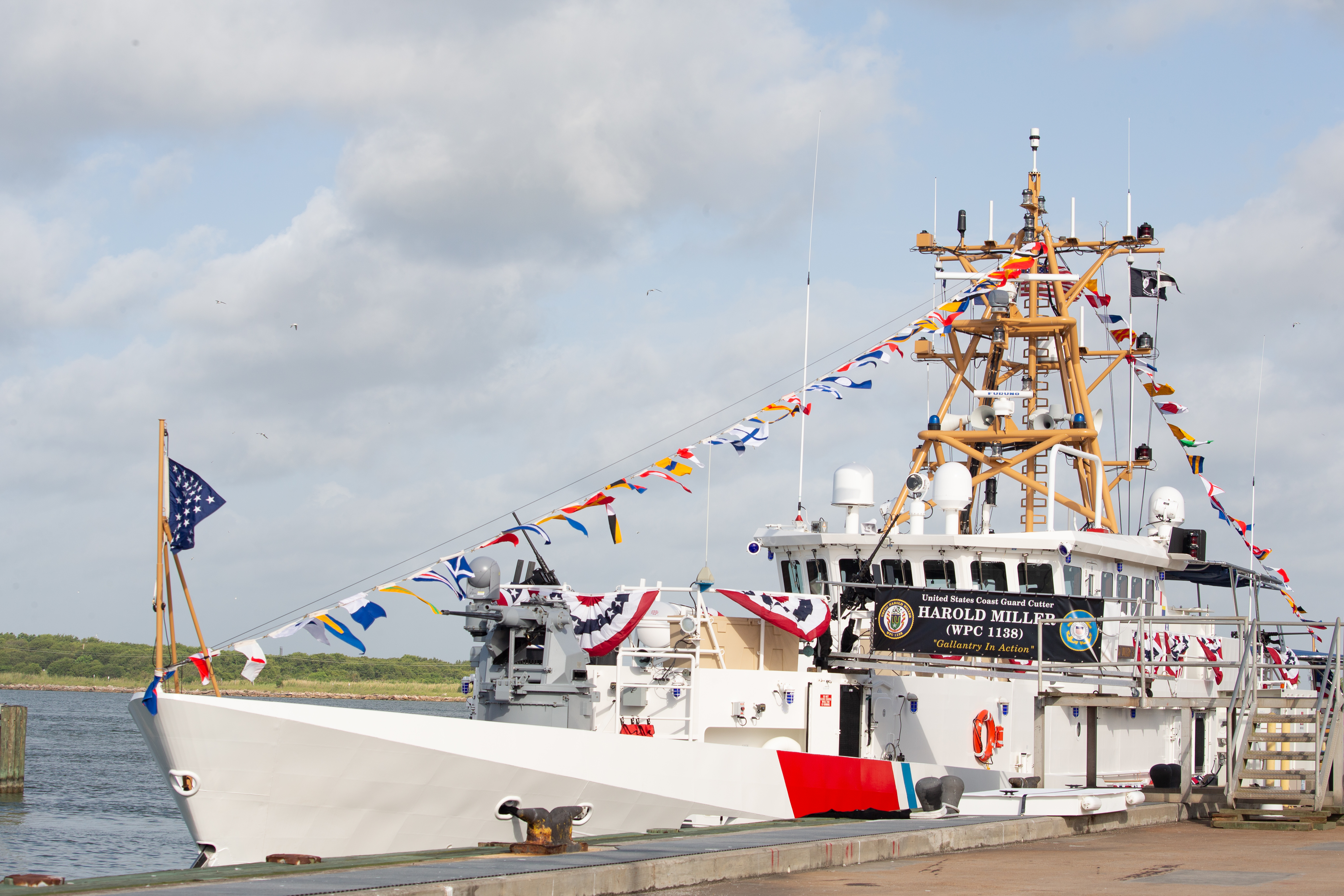
- USCGC Harold Miller moored in Galveston for the first time

History

United States
- Name: Harold Miller
- Namesake: Harold Miller
- Operator: United States Coast Guard
- Builder: Bollinger Shipyards, Lockport, Louisiana
- Launched: April 2, 2020
- Acquired: April 2, 2020
- Commissioned: July 15, 2020
- Home port: Galveston
- Identification: Hull number: WPC-1138
- Motto: Gallantry in action
- Status: in active service
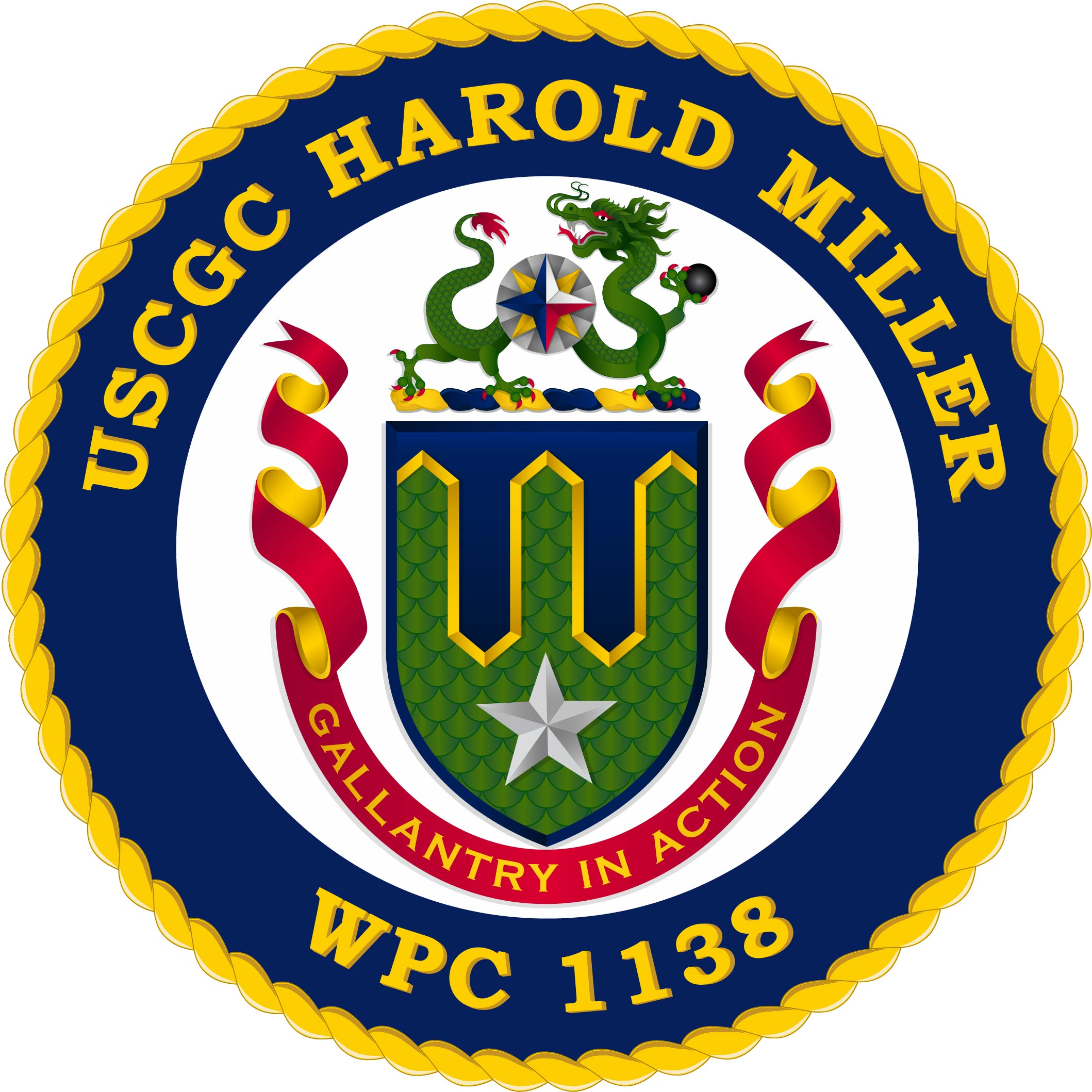
- Badge

General characteristics
- Class & type: Sentinel-class cutter
- Displacement: 353 long tons (359 t)
- Length: 46.8 m (154 ft)
- Beam: 8.11 m (26.6 ft)
- Depth: 2.9 m (9.5 ft)
- Propulsion: 2 × 4,300 kW (5,800 shp); 1 × 75 kW (101 shp) bow thruster
- Speed: 28 knots (52 km/h; 32 mph)
- Range: 2,500 nautical miles (4,600 km; 2,900 mi)
- Endurance: 5 days
- Boats & landing craft carried: 1 × Cutter Boat - Over the Horizon Interceptor
- Complement: 4 officers, 20 crew
- Sensors & processing systems: L-3 C4ISR suite
- Armament: 1 × Mk 38 Mod 2 25 mm automatic gun; 4 × crew-served Browning M2 machine guns
- Notes: First Commanding Officer LT Michael Salerno

USCGC Harold Miller (WPC-1138) is the United States Coast Guard's 38th Sentinel-class cutter.

Like her sister ships she was built in the Bollinger Shipyards, in Lockport, Louisiana.

== Design ==
Like her sister ships, Harold Miller is designed to perform search and rescue missions, port security, and the interception of smugglers. She is armed with a remotely-controlled, gyro-stabilized 25 mm autocannon, four crew served M2 Browning machine guns, and light arms. She is equipped with a stern launching ramp, that allows her to launch or retrieve a water-jet propelled high-speed auxiliary boat, without first coming to a stop. Her high-speed boat has over-the-horizon capability, and is useful for inspecting other vessels, and deploying boarding parties.

The crew's drinking water needs are met through a desalination unit. The crew mess is equipped with a television with satellite reception.

== Operational career ==
Harold Miller was delivered for her pre-commissioning sea trials on April 2, 2020. She was commissioned on July 15, 2020, at her homeport of Galveston, Texas.

== Namesake ==
In 2010, Master Chief Petty Officer of the Coast Guard Charles "Skip" W. Bowen, who was then the United States Coast Guard's most senior non-commissioned officer, proposed that all 58 cutters in the Sentinel class should be named after enlisted sailors in the Coast Guard, or one of its precursor services, who were recognized for their heroism. The Coast Guard chose Harold Miller as the namesake of the 38th cutter. Miller, and three other Coast Guard sailors, piloted the first landing craft during the United States's first amphibious landing, in the Pacific Theater, during World War II. Miller and his three colleagues were each awarded a Silver Star medal for this task. His colleagues Daniel Tarr and Glen Harris have Sentinel-class cutters named after them, as will his other colleague William Sparling.
