= Heinrich Müller (politician) =

South African politician

Heinrich Müller MPL

Member of the Eastern Cape Provincial Legislature
- Incumbent
- Assumed office 14 June 2024

Personal details
- Born: Heinrich Müller; 11 December 1981 (age 44)
- Party: Democratic Alliance
- Profession: Politician

Heinrich Müller (born 11 December 1981) is a South African politician who has been a member of the Eastern Cape Provincial Legislature since 2024 where he represents the Democratic Alliance. He formerly served as the ward councillor for ward 9 in Nelson Mandela Bay.
