= Henry W. Miller House =

Historic house in Illinois, United States

- U.S. National Register of Historic Places
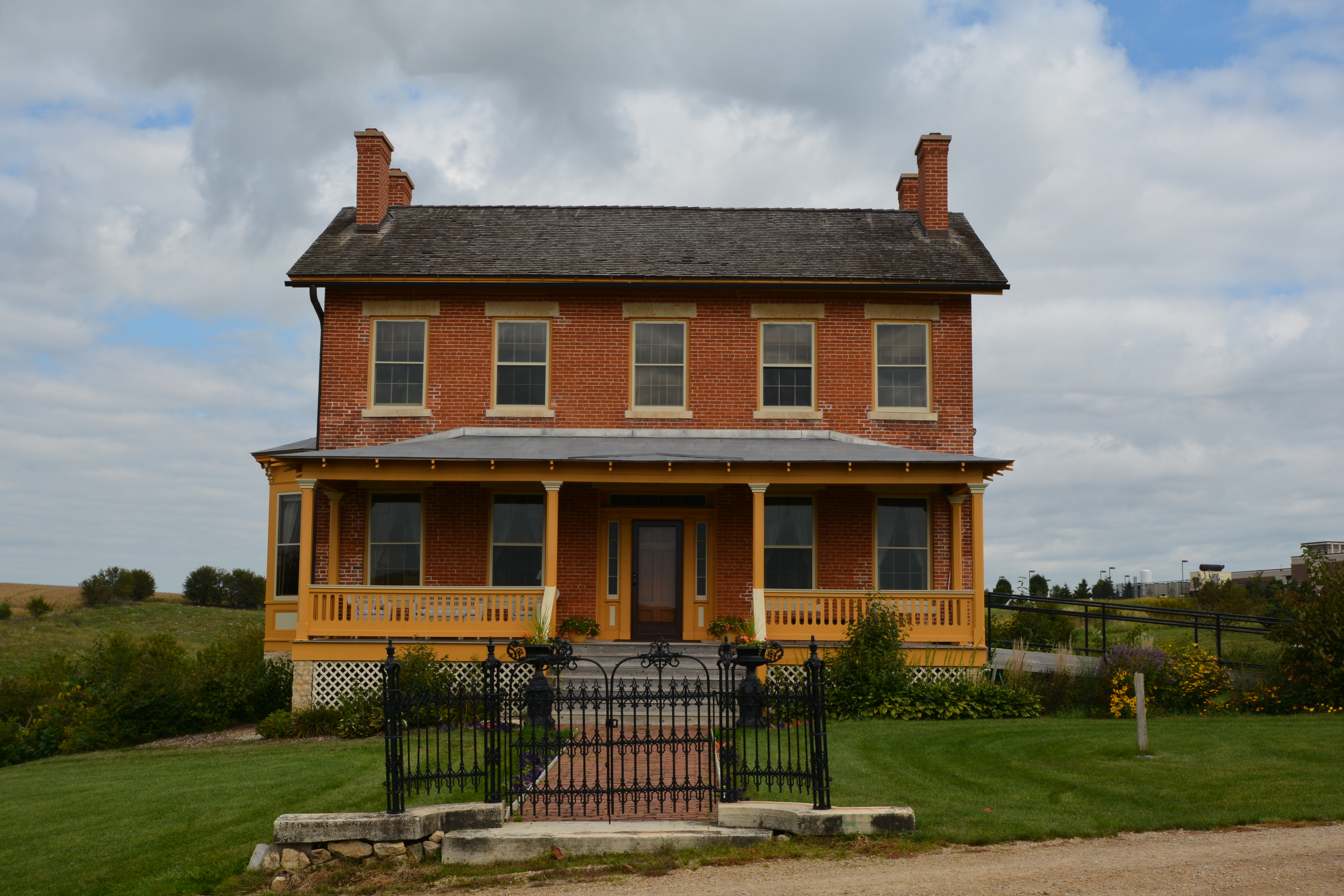

- Location within Illinois Location within the United States
- Location: 11672 W. Norris Ln., Galena, Illinois
- Coordinates: 42°26′48″N 90°27′36″W
- Architectural style: Greek Revival
- NRHP reference No.: 10000836
- Added to NRHP: October 13, 2010

The Henry W. Miller House is a historic house located at 11672 West Norris Lane in Galena, Illinois. Henry W. Miller, a flour wholesaler and dealer who played an important role in Galena's large flour-producing industry, had the house built between 1847 and 1850. The house was built on a plot of land overlooking the plank toll road that connected Galena to Dubuque, Iowa and Mineral Point, Wisconsin; the route, which is now part of U.S. Route 20, eventually became known for its collection of large, elaborate homes. Miller chose the popular Greek Revival style for his house; its design features sidelights and a transom around the front door, a door surround with pilasters and dentillation, and a symmetrical front with six-over-six windows. Richard Barrett, who owned the house in the 1870s, added its Italianate bay window.

The house was added to the National Register of Historic Places on October 13, 2010.
