= North Texas Mean Green men's basketball =

Men's college basketball team

2025–26 North Texas Mean Green men's basketball team
- Head coach: Daniyal Robinson (1st season)
- Location: Denton, Texas
- Arena: UNT Coliseum (capacity: 10,500)
- Conference: The American
- Nickname: Mean Green
- Colors: Green and white
- Student section: Mean Green Maniacs

NCAA Division I tournament round of 32
- 2021

NCAA Division I tournament appearances
- 1988, 2007, 2010, 2021

NIT champions
- 2023

Conference tournament champions
- Southland: 1988; Sun Belt: 2007, 2010; C-USA: 2021

Conference regular-season champions
- TIAA: 1922, 1923, 1926, 1927; Lone Star: 1938, 1942, 1943, 1948; Gulf Coast: 1951, 1952, 1953, 1954; Southland: 1988, 1989; Sun Belt: 2010; C-USA: 2020, 2022

Uniforms
Home	Away

The North Texas Mean Green men's basketball team represents the University of North Texas (UNT) in NCAA Division I college basketball, competing as a member of the American Conference.

For most of its history, the Mean Green have had patches of success, starting in the 1970s when the team received its first top-20 ranking under head coach Bill Blakeley as well as success in the late 1980s and early 1990s under head coach Jimmy Gales and then again in the mid to late 2000s under head coach Johnny Jones. Blakeley coached three consecutive 20-win seasons: 1975–76 (22–4); 1976–77 (21–6); 1977–78 (22–6). North Texas has appeared in the NCAA tournament on four occasions: 1988, 2007, 2010, and 2021, recording their first-ever tournament win in 2021. The Mean Green went on an especially strong run in the 2006–2010 era, with two tournament appearances, two conference championships, and posting more wins over this time period than any other Division I team in the state of Texas.

The 2011–12 and 2012–13 teams featured the only 5-star recruit to play for North Texas in Tony Mitchell. In one season, he became the program's all-time leader in blocks. Despite Mitchell being highly touted, his performance in his second year suffered and he ended up struggling under new head coach Tony Benford eventually falling to the 2nd round of the NBA draft.

On April 16, 2012, longtime head coach Johnny Jones was formally introduced as the next head coach of his alma mater LSU. His replacement, Tony Benford, was not able to capitalize on the program's momentum, resulting in a disappointing final year in the Sun Belt Conference and then more struggles in the Mean Green's new conference Conference USA.

Prior to 1973, the Mean Green played home games at the Ken Bahnsen Gym, nicknamed the Snake Pit. The teams now plays games at the UNT Coliseum, nicknamed The Super Pit.

== Rivals ==
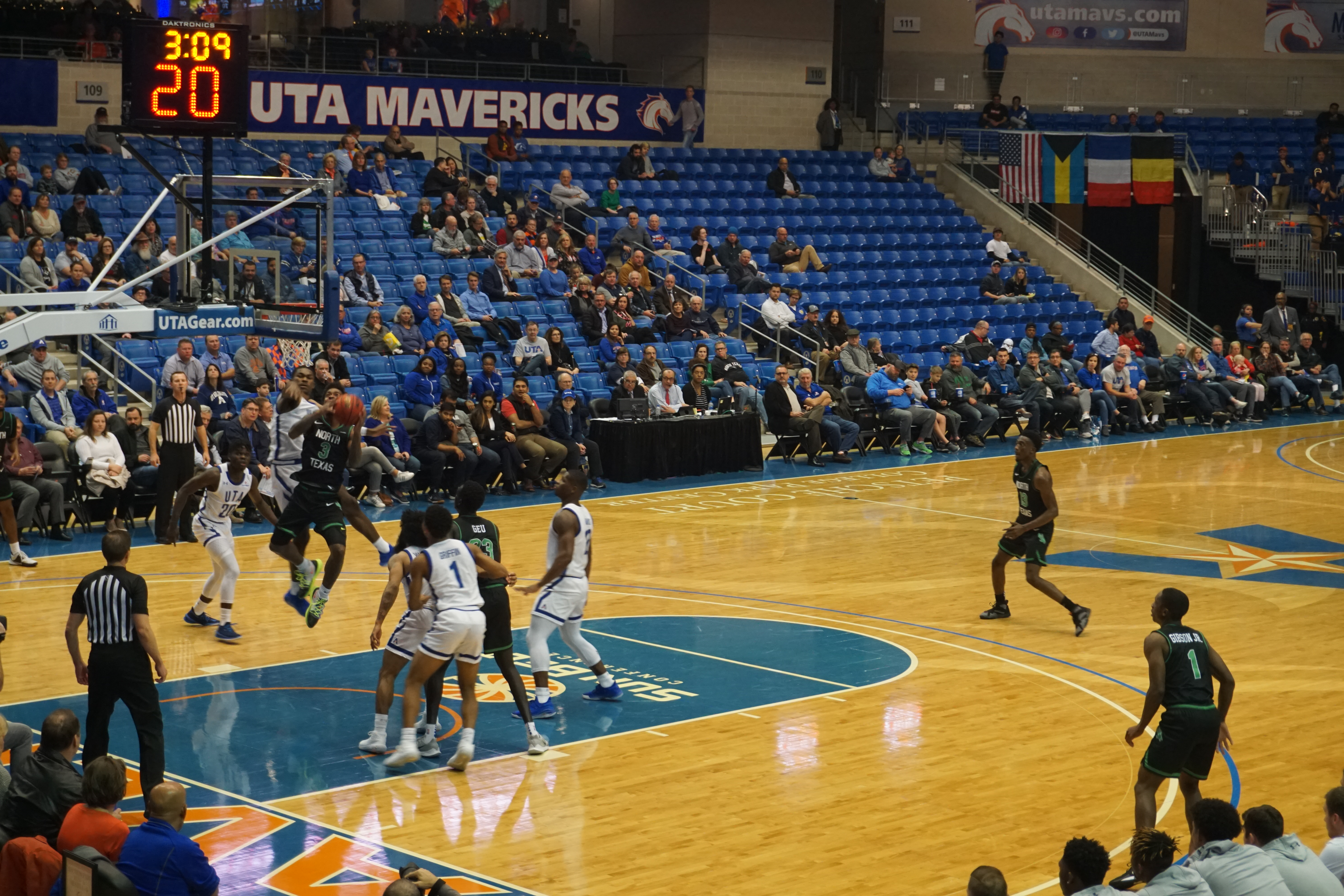
North Texas in action at UT Arlington

While the Mean Green hold a fierce rivalry with the UTSA Roadrunners across athletics in general, the team's most contentious conference rivals in men's basketball currently are the UAB Blazers and FAU Owls. In 2023, the Mean Green and Blazers met four times in which UNT won the series, 3–1. The Blazers knocked the Mean Green out of the Conference USA tournament while the Mean Green defeated the Blazers in the 2023 NIT Championship. During the Grant McCasland era, there was also a stretch where the road team in the series won nine straight games. And while North Texas leads the historical series with FAU, a 2023 Final Four participant, 14–11, the Mean Green have dropped five straight games against the Owls by a combined 21 points, including a 77–71 loss in the 2024 AAC tournament.

The Mean Green briefly restored their rivalry with the SMU Mustangs the one year they shared in the AAC (2023–24), with the home team winning both matchups by an average of 2.5 points. It is unclear if the teams will continue the series once the Mustangs enter the ACC in 2024–25. The teams have only played 19 times since 1949–50.

Notable Non-conference rivals include the University of Texas at Arlington Mavericks, and former Conference USA foes Louisiana Tech, Middle Tennessee, and Western Kentucky.

== Coaches ==
Years	Coach
1916–1920	J.W. St. Clair
1920–1921	Theron Fouts
1921–1924	J.W. St. Clair
1924–1929	John Reid
1929–1933	Terrance Myracle
1933-35	Jack Sisco
1935–1959	Henry "Pete" Shands (1899–1983)
1959–1965	Charles Johnson
1965–1970	Dan Spika
1970–1971	Harry Miller
1971–1975	Gene Robbins
1975–1983	Bill Blakeley
1983–1986	Tommy Newman
1986–1993	Jimmy Gales
1993–1997	Tim Jankovich
1997–2001	Vic Trilli
2001–2012	Johnny Jones
2012–2017	Tony Benford
2017–2023	Grant McCasland
2023–2025	Ross Hodge
2025–present	Daniyal Robinson

== Postseason results ==
=== NCAA tournament results ===
The Mean Green have appeared in the NCAA tournament four times. Their combined record is 1–4.

Year	Seed	Round	Opponent	Result
1988	#15	First Round	#2 North Carolina	L 65–83
2007	#15	First Round	#2 Memphis	L 58–73
2010	#15	First Round	#2 Kansas State	L 62–82
2021	#13	First Round; Second Round	#4 Purdue #5 Villanova	W 78–69; L 61–84

=== NIT results ===
The Mean Green have appeared in the National Invitation Tournament (NIT) four times consecutively, winning it in 2023. Their combined record is 10–3.

Year	Round	Opponent	Result
2022	First Round; Second Round	Texas State; Virginia	W 67–63^{OT} L 69–71^{OT}
2023	First Round; Second Round; Quarterfinals; Semifinals; Final	Alcorn State; Sam Houston; Oklahoma State; Wisconsin; UAB	W 69–53; W 75–55; W 65–59^{OT} W 56–54; W 68–61
2024	First Round; Second Round	LSU; Seton Hall	W 84–77; L 58–72
2025	First Round; Second Round; Quarterfinals; Semifinals	Furman; Arkansas State; Oklahoma State; UC Irvine	W 75–65; W 65–63; W 61–59; L 67–69

=== CBI results ===
The Mean Green have appeared in the College Basketball Invitational (CBI) once, winning it in 2018. Their record is 5–1.

Year	Round	Opponent	Result
2018	First Round; Quarterfinals; Semifinals; Finals–Game 1 Finals–Game 2 Finals–Game 3	South Dakota; Mercer; Jacksonville State; San Francisco; San Francisco; San Francisco	W 90–77; W 96–67; W 90–68; L 62–72; W 69–55; W 88–77

=== NAIA Tournament results ===
The Mean Green have appeared in the NAIA Tournament two times. Their record is 3–2.

Year	Round	Opponent	Result
1938	First Round; Second Round	Morningside; Delta State	W 31–29; L 39–48
1942	First Round; Second Round; Quarterfinals	Wisconsin-Stout; York (NE); Hamline	W 60–37; W 51–49; L 41–45

== Broadcasts ==
North Texas games are broadcast on the radio by the Mean Green Sports Network, part of Learfield IMG College on 88.1 KNTU and 95.3 KHYI. Former Texas Rangers and Dallas Mavericks announcer Dave Barnett does play by play, along with Hank Dickenson on color commentary.

Television broadcasts are carried by the family of ESPN networks, including ESPN+, ESPN2, and ESPNU.

== Professional players ==
- Jeremy Combs (born 1995), basketball player for Israeli team Hapoel Ramat Gan Givatayim
- Chris Jones (born 1993), basketball player for Maccabi Tel Aviv of the Israeli Basketball Premier League
- Mike Miller (born 1996), basketball player for the Bristol Flyers of the British Basketball League
- Thomas Bell III (born 1998), basketball player for the Bristol Flyers of the British Basketball League
- Zach Simmons (born 1999), basketball player for Vitoria BC of the Liga Portuguesa de Basquetebol
