= Henry Miller (cricketer) =

English cricketer

Henry Miller (18 September 1859 – 11 April 1927) was an English cricketer active from 1880 to 1881 who played for Lancashire. He was born in Liverpool and died in Walton-on-Thames. He appeared in five first-class matches as a righthanded batsman who bowled right arm fast. He scored 84 runs with a highest score of 27 and held one catch. He took ten wickets with a best analysis of five for 46.
