= Harry Miller (cricketer) =

English cricketer

Personal information
- Full name: Harry Rayment Miller
- Born: 22 February 1907; Gravesend, Kent, England
- Died: 1 September 1966 (aged 59); Inverness, Inverness-shire, Scotland
- Batting: Right-handed
- Bowling: Right-arm medium

Domestic team information
- Years: Team
- 1928: Warwickshire

Career statistics
Competition	First-class
Matches	1
Runs scored	8
Batting average	8.00
100s/50s	–/–
Top score	8
Balls bowled	78
Wickets	1
Bowling average	38.00
5 wickets in innings	–
10 wickets in match	–
Best bowling	1/15
Catches/stumpings	1/–
- Source: Cricinfo, 28 December 2011

Harry Rayment Miller (22 February 1907 – 1 September 1966) was an English cricketer. Miller was a right-handed batsman who bowled right-arm medium pace. He was born at Gravesend, Kent.

Miller made a single first-class appearance for Warwickshire against Worcestershire at Edgbaston in the 1928 County Championship. Worcestershire made 312 in their first-innings, with Miller bowling 7 wicketless overs, while in response Warwickshire made 402/8 declared in their first-innings, with Miller scoring 8 runs before he was dismissed by Jack Bowles. In their second-innings, Worcestershire scored 112/3, with Miller taking the wicket of Bernard Quaife with figures of 1/15 from 6 overs.

He died at Inverness, Inverness-shire, Scotland on 1 September 1966.
