= Harry Millar (rugby union) =

Irish rugby union player

- Full name: William Henry Jordan Millar
- Born: 9 January 1924 Bangor, Co. Down, Northern Ireland
- Died: 21 March 2003 (aged 79) Newtownards, Co. Down, Northern Ireland

Rugby union career
- Position: Wing
International career
| Years | Team | Apps | (Points) |
| 1951–52 | Ireland | 5 | (0) |

William Henry Jordan Millar (9 January 1924 — 21 March 2003) was an Irish international rugby union player.

Millar was a graduate of Queen's University Belfast.

An Ulster wing three-quarter, Millar was capped five times for Ireland, beginning with three matches in their championship-winning 1951 Five Nations campaign. Lacking an accurate place kicker, Millar was one of four to be utilised in the drawn final fixture against Wales, missing a last-minute miss shot which would have secured a triple crown. He made a further two appearances during the 1952 Five Nations.

== See also ==
- List of Ireland national rugby union players
