= Harry Miller (basketball, born 1927) =

American basketball player and coach

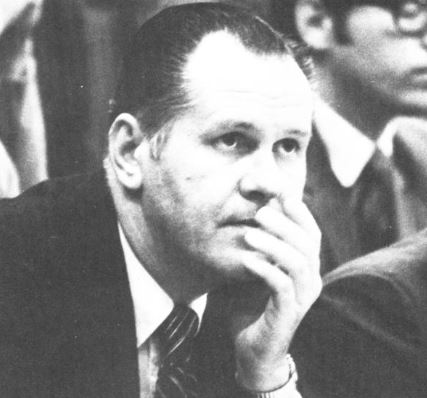
- Miller in his sole season at North Texas

Biographical details
- Born: January 26, 1927; Brown County, Indiana, U.S.
- Died: February 13, 2013 (aged 86); Nacogdoches, Texas, U.S.

Playing career
- ?–1951: Eastern New Mexico
- Position(s): Center

Coaching career (HC unless noted)
- 1952–1953: House HS
- 1953–1958: Western State
- 1958–1960: New Mexico (assistant)
- 1960–1965: Fresno State
- 1965–1970: Eastern New Mexico
- 1970–1971: North Texas
- 1971–1978: Wichita State
- 1978–1988: Stephen F. Austin

Head coaching record
- Overall: 534–374

Accomplishments and honors

Championships
- NAIA tournament (1969); MVC regular season (1976); 2 LSC regular season (1981, 1982); Gulf Star regular season (1987)

Awards
- 2× Gulf Star Coach of the Year (1986, 1987); 2× LSC Coach of the Year (1982, 1983)

Harry Eugene Miller (January 26, 1927 – February 13, 2013) was an American college basketball coach. He spent 34 years as a head coach for Western State (now Western Colorado University), Fresno State, Eastern New Mexico, North Texas, Wichita State and Stephen F. Austin.

Miller played college basketball at Eastern New Mexico as a 6 ft 5 in (1.96 m) center, graduating in 1951. He began his coaching career at House High School in New Mexico before getting his first college head coaching job at Western State College in Gunnison, Colorado. In six seasons at Western, he compiled a record of 84 wins and 64 losses. He then moved to Division I New Mexico in 1958 as an assistant on Bob Sweeney's staff. After two seasons he moved to a successful five-year stint at Fresno State where he led the then-Division II Bulldogs to four consecutive California Collegiate Athletic Association (CCAA) titles from 1962 to 1965 and a record of 96–40.

Miller was lured back to Eastern New Mexico to take over the head coaching role of his alma mater upon the recommendation of his former coach, Al Garten following Garten's retirement. In five seasons, Miler led the Greyhounds to a 104–35 record and the 1969 NAIA National Championship behind All-American Greg Hyder. The following year, Miller and Hyder led the Greyhounds back to the Final Four. Miller parlayed this success in that offseason to his first Division I coaching job, at North Texas. Following a 10-15 1970–71 season, Miller moved to Wichita State, citing better salary and facilities as reasons for the quick move. Miller led the Shockers to a 97–90 record over seven seasons (including a Missouri Valley Conference title in 1976) before being fired in 1978 due to declining attendance for the program.

Miller spent the next ten seasons as head coach at Stephen F. Austin, compiling a record of 170–112. During his time there, the Lumberjacks made the transition to Division I, winning the program's first Division I conference championship in the 1986–87 season. Miller died on February 13, 2013, in Nacogdoches, Texas, at age 86.
