= Henry D. Miller =

American politician

Henry Delbert Miller (born near Morley, Iowa in 1867, died August 26, 1945) was a Democratic member of the Iowa State Senate from the twenty-fourth district first elected in 1932 and serving until 1939. Miller owned a car dealership and a general store before entering politics.

== Personal information ==
From the years of 1917 to 1926 Miller's business required him to live in Cedar Rapids, Iowa. From 1910 to 1926 Miller was a distributor for the Buick Motor company. At this job, miller has been recognized as the only man who shipped automobiles by the train load into the state of Iowa. Along with his distributing business, he also possesses farming experience. Miller had also managed a general store in Morley, Iowa for almost fourteen years. Miller can be accredited for building up and what still remains as one of the largest herd of pure bred Aberdeen Angus cattle in the world on top of being the largest individual farmer in Jones or Cedar counties.

Miller died at his home near Morley at the age of 78.
