= 2024–25 East Carolina Pirates men's basketball team =

American college basketball season

2024–25 East Carolina Pirates men's basketball
- Conference: American Athletic Conference
- Record: 19–14 (10–8 AAC)
- Head coach: Michael Schwartz (3rd season)
- Assistant coaches: Riley Davis; Reggie Williams; Josh Giardina; I.J. Poole; Michael Perry
- Home arena: Williams Arena

2024–25 American Athletic Conference men's basketball standings
	Conf.				Overall
Team	W		L	PCT	W		L	PCT
No. 25 Memphis †	16	–	2	.889	29	–	6	.829
North Texas	14	–	4	.778	27	–	9	.750
UAB	13	–	5	.722	24	–	13	.649
Tulane	12	–	6	.667	19	–	15	.559
Florida Atlantic	10	–	8	.556	18	–	16	.529
East Carolina	10	–	8	.556	19	–	14	.576
Temple	9	–	9	.500	17	–	15	.531
Wichita State	8	–	10	.444	19	–	15	.559
South Florida	6	–	12	.333	13	–	19	.406
Tulsa	6	–	12	.333	13	–	20	.394
UTSA	6	–	12	.333	12	–	19	.387
Rice	4	–	14	.222	13	–	19	.406
Charlotte	3	–	15	.167	11	–	22	.333
† 2025 AAC tournament winner Rankings from AP Poll

The 2024–25 East Carolina Pirates men's basketball team represented East Carolina University during the 2024–25 NCAA Division I men's basketball season. The Pirates, led by third year head coach Michael Schwartz, played their home games at Williams Arena at Minges Coliseum as tenth-year members of the American Athletic Conference.

== Previous season ==
The Pirates finished the 2023–24 season 15–18, 7–11 in AAC play to finish in tie for eighth place. As a No. 8 seed in the AAC tournament they defeated Tulsa in the second round before falling to South Florida in the quarterfinals.

== Offseason ==
=== Departures ===
Name	Number	Pos.	Height	Weight	Year	Hometown	Reason for departure
Bobby Pettiford Jr.	0	G	6'0"	196	Junior	Durham, NC	Transferred to High Point
Kalib LaCount	1	G	5'8"	148	Sophomore	Los Angeles, CA	Transferred to Cal Poly Humboldt
Ezra Ausar	2	F	6'8"	247	Sophomore	Atlanta, GA	Transferred to Utah
Logan Bourgeois	5	G	6'1"	154	Freshman	Fleury-les-Aubrais, France	Transferred
Brandon Johnson	6	F	6'8"	222	(redshirt) Junior	Raleigh, NC	Transferred to Miami (FL)
Quentin Diboundje	7	G	6'5"	221	Junior	Montpellier, France	Transferred to Rhode Island
Valentino Pinedo	11	F	6'7'	228	Sophomore	Madrid, Spain	Transferred to St. Francis (PA)
Jaden Walker	21	G	6'5"	200	Junior	Lawrenceville, GA	Transferred
Ta'Korrie Faison	23	G/F	6'5"	224	Freshman	Goldsboro, NC	Transferred to Mount Olive
Benjamin Bayela	25	G	6'6"	200	Senior	Le Chesnay-Rocquencourt, France	Graduate transferred to Jacksonville State

=== Incoming transfers ===
Name	Num	Pos.	Height	Weight	Year	Hometown	Previous school
Jayshayne Woodard	0	G	6'7"		Junior	Harlem, NY	Indian River State College
Julien Soumaoro	2	G	5'11"	175	Senior	Bronx, NY	Gardner–Webb
Yann Farell	4	F	6'6"	210	Junior	Libreville, Gabon	St. Bonaventure
Jordan Riley	12	G	6'4"	200	Senior	Brentwood, NY	Temple
C. J. Walker	14	F	6'8"	205	GS Senior	Sanford, FL	UCF
Trevion LaBeaux	24	F	6'5"	215	Junior	Waterloo, IA	Indian Hills CC

=== 2024 recruiting class ===
College recruiting information
Name	Hometown	School	Height	Weight	Commit date
Tybo Bailey #53 SG	Winston-Salem, NC	Winston-Salem Christian School	6 ft 3 in (1.91 m)	175 lb (79 kg)	May 24, 2024
Tybo Bailey #53 SG	Recruit ratings: Rivals: 247Sports: ESPN: (79)				
Ladontae Felton; CG	Aiken, SC	South Aiken High School	6 ft 2 in (1.88 m)	175 lb (79 kg)	Oct 6, 2023
Ladontae Felton; CG	Recruit ratings: Rivals: 247Sports: ESPN: (NR)				
Reid Cason; C	Kingston, OK	Kingston High School	6 ft 10 in (2.08 m)	225 lb (102 kg)	Jul 15, 2024
Reid Cason; C	Recruit ratings: Rivals: 247Sports: ESPN: (NR)				
Overall recruit ranking:
Note: In many cases, Scout, Rivals, 247Sports, On3, and ESPN may conflict in their listings of height and weight.; In these cases, the average was taken. ESPN grades are on a 100-point scale.; Sources: "East Carolina 2024 Basketball Commitments". Rivals.; "2024 East Carolina Pirates Recruiting Class". ESPN.; "2024 Team Ranking". Rivals.; "2024 East Carolina Pirates Basketball 24/7 Sports Commits". 247Sports.

=== 2025 recruiting class ===
College recruiting information (2025)
Name	Hometown	School	Height	Weight	Commit date
Jordan Vick #67 PG	Bailey, NC	Southern Nash High School	6 ft 0 in (1.83 m)	160 lb (73 kg)	Sep 25, 2022
Jordan Vick #67 PG	Recruit ratings: Rivals: 247Sports: ESPN: (78)				
Overall recruit ranking:
Note: In many cases, Scout, Rivals, 247Sports, On3, and ESPN may conflict in their listings of height and weight.; In these cases, the average was taken. ESPN grades are on a 100-point scale.; Sources: "East Carolina 2025 Basketball Commitments". Rivals.; "2025 East Carolina Pirates Recruiting Class". ESPN.; "2025 Team Ranking". Rivals.; "2025 East Carolina Pirates Basketball 24/7 Sports Commits". 247Sports.

== Roster ==
2024–25 East Carolina Pirates men's basketball team
Players
Coaches

Pos.	#	Name	Height	Weight	Year	Previous school	Hometown
G	0	Jayshayne Woodard	6 ft 7 in (2.01 m)	180 lb (82 kg)	Jr	Indian River State College	Harlem, NY
G	1	Cam Hayes	6 ft 3 in (1.91 m)	190 lb (86 kg)	Sr	LSU	Greensboro, NC
G	2	Julien Soumaoro	5 ft 10 in (1.78 m)	168 lb (76 kg)	Sr	Gardner–Webb	Bronx, NY
G	3	RJ Felton	6 ft 3 in (1.91 m)	214 lb (97 kg)	Sr	Aiken High School	Aiken, SC
G/F	4	Yann Farell	6 ft 6 in (1.98 m)	211 lb (96 kg)	Jr	St. Bonaventure	Libreville, Gabon
G/F	5	Benção Vungo	6 ft 6 in (1.98 m)	215 lb (98 kg)	So	Southern Coast Academy	Chitato, Angola
G	6	Ladontae Felton	6 ft 2 in (1.88 m)	179 lb (81 kg)	Fr	Aiken High School	Aiken, SC
G	7	Tybo Bailey	6 ft 2 in (1.88 m)	187 lb (85 kg)	Fr	Winston Salem Christian School	Winston-Salem, NC
G	10	Evan Montanari (W)	6 ft 3 in (1.91 m)	178 lb (81 kg)	So	Gaston Day School	Denver, NC
G	12	Jordan Riley	6 ft 4 in (1.93 m)	239 lb (108 kg)	Sr	Temple	Brentwood, NY
F	14	C. J. Walker	6 ft 8 in (2.03 m)	214 lb (97 kg)	GS	UCF	Sanford, FL
F	23	Reid Cason	6 ft 10 in (2.08 m)	228 lb (103 kg)	Fr	Kingston High School (OK)	Kingston, OK
F	24	Trevion LaBeaux	6 ft 3 in (1.91 m)	210 lb (95 kg)	Jr	Indian Hills CC	Waterloo, IA
C	32	Cyr Malonga	6 ft 11 in (2.11 m)	239 lb (108 kg)	So	Evangel Christian School	Pointe-Noire, Republic of the Congo
F	35	Grant Smith (W)	6 ft 7 in (2.01 m)	203 lb (92 kg)	Jr	Quincy College	Richmond, VA
C	50	Callum Richard	6 ft 10 in (2.08 m)	235 lb (107 kg)	So	Gaston Day School	Stanley, NC

Head coach

- Michael Schwartz (Texas)

Assistant coach(es)

- Riley Davis (Texas)
- Reggie Williams (VMI)
- Josh Giardina (Marymount)
- I.J. Poole (Texas)
- Michael Perry (Richmond)

Legend

- (C) Team captain
- (S) Suspended
- (I) Ineligible
- (W) Walk-on
- Injured
- Current redshirt

Roster

== Schedule and results ==
Date time, TV	Rank^{#}	Opponent^{#}	Result	Record	High points	High rebounds	High assists	Site (attendance) city, state
Non-conference regular season
November 4, 2024*; 7:00 p.m., ESPN+		North Carolina Wesleyan	W 97–70	1–0	22 – RJ Felton	12 – Walker	4 – Tied	Williams Arena (4,294); Greenville, NC
November 9, 2024*; 4:00 p.m., ESPN+		Coastal Carolina	W 63–59	2–0	25 – RJ Felton	11 – RJ Felton	5 – Hayes	Williams Arena (4,331); Greenville, NC
November 12, 2024*; 7:00 p.m., ESPN+		Mount Olive	W 110–73	3–0	24 – Walker	12 – RJ Felton	8 – RJ Felton	Williams Arena (4,183); Greenville, NC
November 16, 2024*; 4:00 p.m., ESPN+		George Mason	W 78–77 ^{2OT}	4–0	27 – RJ Felton	12 – Walker	5 – Hayes	Williams Arena (3,916); Greenville, NC
November 21, 2024*; 4:00 p.m., BallerTV		vs. Jacksonville State; Boardwalk Battle quarterfinals	L 78–86	4–1	20 – Tied	7 – Tied	4 – Hayes	Ocean Center; Daytona Beach, FL
November 22, 2024*; 1:00 p.m., BallerTV		vs. Stetson; Boardwalk Battle consolation round	W 71–64	5–1	21 – RJ Felton	8 – RJ Felton	2 – Tied	Ocean Center; Daytona Beach, FL
November 23, 2024*; 1:00 p.m., BallerTV		vs. UIC; Boardwalk Battle 5th place game	W 72–55	6–1	21 – Tied	8 – Walker	4 – Woodard	Ocean Center; Daytona Beach, FL
November 29, 2024*; 5:30 p.m., ESPN+		North Carolina A&T	W 93–69	7–1	23 – Walker	6 – LaBeaux	6 – Tied	Williams Arena (4,260); Greenville, NC
December 3, 2024*; 7:00 p.m., ESPN+		UNC Wilmington	L 53–67	7–2	16 – Walker	7 – Tied	3 – Soumaoro	Williams Arena (4,515); Greenville, NC
December 7, 2024*; 2:00 p.m., SECN+/ESPN+		at South Carolina	L 68–75	7–3	18 – Riley	6 – Walker	3 – RJ Felton	Colonial Life Arena (10,997); Columbia, SC
December 11, 2024*; 7:00 p.m., ESPN+		North Alabama	L 67–74	7–4	18 – Walker	6 – RJ Felton	4 – Tied	Williams Arena (3,177); Greenville, NC
December 17, 2024*; 7:00 p.m., ESPN+		FIU	W 75–64	8–4	23 – Walker	10 – Walker	7 – Hayes	Williams Arena (3,359); Greenville, NC
December 21, 2024*; 3:00 p.m., ESPN+		Gardner–Webb	L 79–84	8–5	19 – RJ Felton	8 – Riley	4 – Hayes	Williams Arena (3,672); Greenville, NC
AAC regular season
December 31, 2024; 3:00 p.m., ESPN+		at South Florida	L 69–75	8–6 (0–1)	20 – Riley	8 – RJ Felton	4 – Hayes	Yuengling Center (3,265); Tampa, FL
January 5, 2025; 1:00 p.m., ESPN2		Florida Atlantic	L 76–78	8–7 (0–2)	21 – Walker	13 – Walker	4 – Hayes	Williams Arena (3,858); Greenville, NC
January 8, 2025; 7:00 p.m., ESPN+		Temple	W 80–79	9–7 (1–2)	23 – RJ Felton	9 – Walker	4 – Tied	Williams Arena (3,274); Greenville, NC
January 11, 2025; 2:00 p.m., ESPN+		at No. 19 Memphis	L 70–74	9–8 (1–3)	23 – Walker	13 – RJ Felton	4 – Hayes	FedExForum (10,863); Memphis, TN
January 14, 2025; 7:00 p.m., ESPN+		North Texas	L 60–69	9–9 (1–4)	30 – RJ Felton	6 – RJ Felton	5 – Hayes	Williams Arena (4,033); Greenville, NC
January 18, 2025; 7:00 p.m., ESPN+		at Wichita State	W 75–72	10–9 (2–4)	28 – Walker	5 – Woodard	4 – Tied	Charles Koch Arena (5,826); Wichita, KS
January 21, 2025; 8:00 p.m., ESPN+		at Tulsa	W 85–76 ^{OT}	11–9 (3–4)	27 – Riley	8 – RJ Felton	5 – RJ Felton	Reynolds Center (2,770); Tulsa, OK
January 25, 2025; 1:00 p.m., ESPN+		South Florida	W 64–55	12–9 (4–4)	15 – Walker	14 – RJ Felton	5 – Walker	Williams Arena (4,701); Greenville, NC
February 1, 2025; 2:00 p.m., ESPN+		at Temple	L 94–98 ^{OT}	12–10 (4–5)	33 – Walker	12 – RJ Felton	4 – Tied	Liacouras Center (4,017); Philadelphia, PA
February 5, 2025; 7:00 p.m., ESPN+		Rice	L 60–73	12–11 (4–6)	23 – Walker	7 – RJ Felton	4 – RJ Felton	Williams Arena (3,827); Greenville, NC
February 8, 2025; 8:00 p.m., ESPNU		at UTSA	W 80–79	13–11 (5–6)	28 – Walker	10 – Walker	8 – Hayes	Convocation Center (1,113); San Antonio, TX
February 11, 2025; 7:00 p.m., ESPNU		UAB	W 82–75	14–11 (6–6)	29 – Walker	7 – Tied	4 – Riley	Williams Arena (3,863); Greenville, NC
February 15, 2025; 4:00 p.m., ESPNews		at Charlotte	W 75–59	15–11 (7–6)	23 – RJ Felton	8 – Riley	8 – Hayes	Dale F. Halton Arena (4,578); Charlotte, NC
February 19, 2025; 7:30 p.m., ESPN+		at Tulane	L 81–86	15–12 (7–7)	19 – Riley	8 – Riley	5 – Hayes	Devlin Fieldhouse (1,454); New Orleans, LA
February 23, 2025; 2:00 p.m., ESPN+		UTSA	W 96–89 ^{OT}	16–12 (8–7)	30 – RJ Felton	8 – Riley	4 – Tied	Williams Arena (3,898); Greenville, NC
March 2, 2025; 12:00 p.m., ESPNU		Charlotte	W 78–76	17–12 (9–7)	27 – RJ Felton	11 – Riley	3 – Tied	Williams Arena (5,115); Greenville, NC
March 6, 2025; 7:00 p.m., ESPN+		Tulane	W 73–64	18–12 (10–7)	17 – Felton	7 – Walker	7 – Hayes	Williams Arena (4,343); Greenville, NC
March 9, 2025; 1:00 p.m., ESPN+		at Florida Atlantic	L 53–81	18–13 (10–8)	18 – Riley	6 – RJ Felton	4 – Woodard	Eleanor R. Baldwin Arena (3,161); Boca Raton, FL
AAC tournament
March 13, 2025; 9:00 p.m., ESPNU	(6)	vs. (11) UTSA; Second round	W 70–65	19–13	22 – Riley	12 – Riley	4 – Hayes	Dickies Arena (4,133); Fort Worth, TX
March 14, 2025; 9:00 p.m., ESPNU	(6)	vs. (3) UAB; Quarterfinals	L 77–94	19–14	31 – RJ Felton	6 – Tied	8 – Hayes	Dickies Arena (4,285); Fort Worth, TX
*Non-conference game. ^{#}Rankings from AP Poll. (#) Tournament seedings in parentheses. All times are in Eastern Time.
