= 2024–25 Temple Owls men's basketball team =

American college basketball season

2024–25 Temple Owls men's basketball
- Conference: American Athletic Conference
- Record: 17–15 (9–9 AAC)
- Head coach: Adam Fisher (2nd season)
- Associate head coach: Michael Huger
- Assistant coaches: Chris Clark; Bobby Jordan
- Home arena: Liacouras Center

2024–25 American Athletic Conference men's basketball standings
	Conf.				Overall
Team	W		L	PCT	W		L	PCT
No. 25 Memphis †	16	–	2	.889	29	–	6	.829
North Texas	14	–	4	.778	27	–	9	.750
UAB	13	–	5	.722	24	–	13	.649
Tulane	12	–	6	.667	19	–	15	.559
Florida Atlantic	10	–	8	.556	18	–	16	.529
East Carolina	10	–	8	.556	19	–	14	.576
Temple	9	–	9	.500	17	–	15	.531
Wichita State	8	–	10	.444	19	–	15	.559
South Florida	6	–	12	.333	13	–	19	.406
Tulsa	6	–	12	.333	13	–	20	.394
UTSA	6	–	12	.333	12	–	19	.387
Rice	4	–	14	.222	13	–	19	.406
Charlotte	3	–	15	.167	11	–	22	.333
† 2025 AAC tournament winner Rankings from AP Poll

The 2024–25 Temple Owls men's basketball team represented Temple University during the 2024–25 NCAA Division I men's basketball season. The Owls, led by second-year head coach Adam Fisher, played their home games at the Liacouras Center in Philadelphia, Pennsylvania as a member of the American Athletic Conference.

== Previous season ==
The Owls finished the 2023–24 season 16–20, 5–13 in AAC play to finish in a five-way tie for last place. As a no. 11 seed in the AAC tournament they defeated UTSA in the first round, SMU in the second round, Charlotte in the quarterfinals and Florida Atlantic in the semifinals before losing the AAC tournament final to UAB.

== Offseason ==
=== Departures ===
Name	Number	Pos.	Height	Weight	Year	Hometown	Reason for departure
Jahlil White	2	G	6'7"	210	(redshirt) Junior	Whitesboro, NJ	Transferred to La Salle
Hysier Miller	3	G	6'1"	190	Junior	Philadelphia, PA	Transferred to Virginia Tech
Jordan Riley	4	G	6'4"	200	Junior	Brentwood, NY	Transferred to East Carolina
Taj Thweatt	10	F	6'7"	225	(redshirt) Junior	Wildwood, NJ	Transferred to Fairmont State
Emmanuel Okpomo	21	C	6'9"	225	Junior	Delta State, Nigeria	Transferred to New Hampshire
Deuce Roberts	22	G	6'6"	200	Sophomore	Kansas City, MO	Transferred
AK Fihla	25	G	6'2"	170	Sophomore	Johannesburg, South Africa	Walk-on; left the team due to personal reasons
Sam Hofman	33	F	6'5"	280	GS senior	Brussels, Belgium	Graduated

=== Incoming transfers ===
Name	Num	Pos.	Height	Weight	Year	Hometown	Previous school
Lynn Greer III	3	G	6'2"	180	Senior	Philadelphia, PA	Saint Joseph's
Mohamed Keita	4	C	7'1"	220	Junior	Conakry, Guinea	Tulsa
Jameel Brown	10	G	6'4"	188	Junior	Philadelphia, PA	Penn State
Elijah Gray	22	F	6'8"	220	Junior	Charlotte, NC	Fordham
Jamal Mashburn Jr.	24	G	6'2"	195	GS senior	Miami, FL	New Mexico
Christian Tomasco	33	F	6'9"	205	(redshirt) Junior	Moorestown, NJ	Walk-on; Hofstra

=== Recruiting classes ===
==== 2024 recruiting class ====
College recruiting
Name	Hometown	School	Height	Weight	Commit date
Dillon Battie #35 C	Lancaster, TX	Lancaster High School	6 ft 8 in (2.03 m)	210 lb (95 kg)	Oct 31, 2023
Dillon Battie #35 C	Recruit ratings: Rivals: 247Sports: ESPN: (78)				
Aiden Tobiason; SG	Wilmington, DE	St Elizabeth High School	6 ft 5 in (1.96 m)	170 lb (77 kg)	Nov 2, 2023
Aiden Tobiason; SG	Recruit ratings: Rivals: 247Sports: ESPN: (NR)				
Babatunde Durodola; SG	Daytona Beach, FL	DME Academy	6 ft 7 in (2.01 m)	205 lb (93 kg)	Aug 16, 2024
Babatunde Durodola; SG	Recruit ratings: Rivals: 247Sports: ESPN: (NR)				
Overall recruit ranking: 247Sports: 80
Note: In many cases, Scout, Rivals, 247Sports, On3, and ESPN may conflict in their listings of height and weight.; In these cases, the average was taken. ESPN grades are on a 100-point scale.; Sources: "2024 Team Ranking". Rivals.

==== 2025 recruiting class ====
College recruiting (2025)
Name	Hometown	School	Height	Weight	Commit date
Cameron Miles #36 PG	Bradenton, FL	IMG Academy	6 ft 2 in (1.88 m)	170 lb (77 kg)	Oct 31, 2023
Cameron Miles #36 PG	Recruit ratings: Rivals: 247Sports: ESPN: (81)				
Cam Wallace; SG	Norristown, PA	Westtown School	6 ft 5 in (1.96 m)	170 lb (77 kg)	Aug 12, 2024
Cam Wallace; SG	Recruit ratings: Rivals: 247Sports: ESPN: (NR)				
Overall recruit ranking: 247Sports: 80
Note: In many cases, Scout, Rivals, 247Sports, On3, and ESPN may conflict in their listings of height and weight.; In these cases, the average was taken. ESPN grades are on a 100-point scale.; Sources: "2025 Team Ranking". Rivals.

== Roster ==
2024–25 Temple Owls men's basketball team
Players
Coaches

Pos.	#	Name	Height	Weight	Year	Previous school	Hometown
G	0	Quante Berry	6 ft 4 in (1.93 m)	185 lb (84 kg)	RS So	Winston Salem Christian School (TN); Providence	Cleveland, TN
G	1	Zion Stanford	6 ft 6 in (1.98 m)	205 lb (93 kg)	So	West Catholic Prep High School	Philadelphia, PA
F	2	Steve Settle III	6 ft 10 in (2.08 m)	192 lb (87 kg)	RS Sr	DeMatha Catholic High School; Howard	Glenarden, MD
G	3	Lynn Greer III	6 ft 3 in (1.91 m)	195 lb (88 kg)	Sr	IMG Academy; Saint Joseph's	Philadelphia, PA
C	4	Mohamed Keita	7 ft 1 in (2.16 m)	225 lb (102 kg)	Jr	The Winchendon School; Tulsa	Conakry, Guinea
F	8	Dillon Battie	6 ft 8 in (2.03 m)	210 lb (95 kg)	Fr	Lancaster High School	Dallas, TX
G	10	Jameel Brown	6 ft 4 in (1.93 m)	195 lb (88 kg)	Jr	Westtown School; Penn State	Philadelphia, PA
F	11	Babatunde Durodola	6 ft 8 in (2.03 m)	220 lb (100 kg)	Fr	DME Academy	Toronto, ON
G	13	Connor Gal (W)	6 ft 4 in (1.93 m)	200 lb (91 kg)	Jr	Great Valley High School	Malvern, PA
F	22	Elijah Gray	6 ft 8 in (2.03 m)	235 lb (107 kg)	Jr	Hargrave Military Academy; Fordham	Charlotte, NC
G	24	Jamal Mashburn Jr.	6 ft 2 in (1.88 m)	195 lb (88 kg)	GS	Brewster Academy; New Mexico	Miami, FL
G	25	Aiden Tobiason	6 ft 5 in (1.96 m)	195 lb (88 kg)	Fr	St. Elizabeth High School	Wilmington, DE
F	32	Holden Pierre-Louis (W)	6 ft 8 in (2.03 m)	210 lb (95 kg)	Fr	St. Andrew's Episcopal School	Potomac, MD
F	33	Christian Tomasco (W)	6 ft 9 in (2.06 m)	220 lb (100 kg)	RS Jr	Archbishop Ryan High School; Hofstra	Moorestown, NJ
G	34	Matteo Picarelli	6 ft 2 in (1.88 m)	195 lb (88 kg)	GS	Inter-Community School Zürich; UMBC	Milan, Italy
G	55	Shane Dezonie	6 ft 4 in (1.93 m)	205 lb (93 kg)	Sr	Brewster Academy; Vanderbilt	Tobyhanna, PA

Head coach

- Adam Fisher (Penn State)

Assistant coach(es)

- Michael Huger (Bowling Green)
- Chris Clark (Temple)
- Bobby Jordan (Drexel)

Legend

- (C) Team captain
- (S) Suspended
- (I) Ineligible
- (W) Walk-on
- Injured
- Current redshirt

Roster

== Schedule and results ==
Date time, TV	Rank^{#}	Opponent^{#}	Result	Record	High points	High rebounds	High assists	Site (attendance) city, state
Non-conference regular season
November 4, 2024*; 5:30 p.m., ESPN+		Sacred Heart	W 81–70	1–0	26 – Mashburn	7 – Tied	6 – Settle III	Liacouras Center (3,485); Philadelphia, PA
November 8, 2024*; 6:00 p.m.		vs. Monmouth; Jersey Jam	W 103–74	2–0	25 – Mashburn Jr.	11 – Settle III	4 – Tied	CURE Insurance Arena (2,247); Trenton, NJ
November 12, 2024*; 7:00 p.m., ESPN+		Drexel; Big 5 Classic Pod 1	W 69–61	3–0	23 – Stanford	9 – Tied	4 – Mashburn Jr.	Liacouras Center (4,547); Philadelphia, PA
November 15, 2024*; 7:00 p.m., ACCNX/ESPN+		at Boston College	L 69–72	3–1	23 – Mashburn Jr.	8 – Settle	4 – Mashburn Jr.	Conte Forum (4,863); Chestnut Hill, MA
November 22, 2024*; 3:00 p.m., ESPN+		vs. Florida State; Hall of Fame Tip-Off	L 69–78	3–2	20 – Mashburn Jr.	6 – Brown	3 – Stanford	Mohegan Sun Arena (2,176); Uncasville, CT
November 23, 2024*; 5:00 p.m., ESPN+		vs. UMass; Hall of Fame Tip-Off	W 87–80	4–2	26 – Mashburn Jr.	12 – Durodola	2 – Settle III	Mohegan Sun Arena (5,368); Uncasville, CT
November 30, 2024*; 4:00 p.m., ESPN+		at La Salle; Big 5 Classic Pod 1	L 75–83	4–3	18 – Berry	15 – Berry	3 – Tied	Tom Gola Arena (3,001); Philadelphia, PA
December 7, 2024*; 4:30 p.m., NBCSP+		vs. Villanova; Big 5 Classic 3rd place game	L 65–94	4–4	20 – Mashburn Jr.	5 – Dezonie	3 – Settle	Wells Fargo Center; Philadelphia, PA
December 10, 2024*; 7:00 p.m., ESPN+		Holy Family	W 110–81	5–4	25 – Stanford	7 – Settle III	5 – Tied	Liacouras Center (2,755); Philadelphia, PA
December 15, 2024*; 12:00 p.m., FloSports		at Hofstra	W 60–42	6–4	12 – Mashburn Jr.	10 – Durodola	4 – Stanford	Mack Sports Complex (2,274); Hempstead, NY
December 18, 2024*; 7:00 p.m., ESPN+		Davidson	W 62–61	7–4	19 – Mashburn Jr.	6 – Tied	3 – Dezonie	Liacouras Center (2,472); Philadelphia, PA
December 21, 2024*; 6:30 p.m., CBSSN		vs. Rhode Island; Basketball Hall of Fame Classic	L 79–85	7–5	18 – Settle	8 – Settle	4 – Berry	MassMutual Center (3,252); Springfield, MA
December 29, 2024*; 3:00 p.m., ESPNU		Buffalo	W 91–71	8–5	18 – Mashburn Jr.	11 – Settle	5 – Dezonie	Liacouras Center (3,198); Philadelphia, PA
AAC regular season
January 3, 2025; 7:00 p.m., ESPN2		Wichita State	W 91–85	9–5 (1–0)	24 – Mashburn Jr.	9 – Settle	5 – Berry	Liacouras Center (3,622); Philadelphia, PA
January 8, 2025; 7:00 p.m., ESPN+		at East Carolina	L 79–80	9–6 (1–1)	22 – Mashburn Jr.	5 – Tied	4 – Berry	Williams Arena (3,274); Greenville, NC
January 11, 2025; 2:00 p.m., ESPNU		at Rice	W 73–70	10–6 (2–1)	24 – Mashburn Jr.	15 – Dezonie	1 – Tied	Tudor Fieldhouse (1,300); Houston, TX
January 16, 2025; 7:00 p.m., ESPN2		No. 18 Memphis	W 88–81	11–6 (3–1)	21 – Mashburn Jr.	13 – Dezonie	4 – Mashburn Jr.	Liacouras Center (5,719); Philadelphia, PA
January 19, 2025; 1:00 p.m., ESPNU		Tulane	W 80–77	12–6 (4–1)	32 – Mashburn Jr.	7 – Berry	3 – Dezonie	Liacouras Center (2,910); Philadelphia, PA
January 22, 2025; 8:00 p.m., ESPN+		at North Texas	L 67–76	12–7 (4–2)	24 – Berry	8 – Dezonie	3 – Durodola	The Super Pit (4,029); Denton, TX
January 25, 2025; 4:00 p.m., ESPN+		at UTSA	L 79–88	12–8 (4–3)	20 – Mashburn Jr.	7 – Tied	4 – Stanford	Convocation Center (1,263); San Antonio, TX
January 29, 2025; 7:00 p.m., ESPN+		Charlotte	W 90–89 ^{2OT}	13–8 (5–3)	34 – Mashburn Jr.	6 – Tied	3 – Tied	Liacouras Center (3,007); Philadelphia, PA
February 1, 2025; 2:00 p.m., ESPN+		East Carolina	W 98–94 ^{OT}	14–8 (6–3)	32 – Mashburn Jr.	7 – Settle III	4 – Mashburn Jr.	Liacouras Center (4,017); Philadelphia, PA
February 6, 2025; 7:00 p.m., ESPN2		at South Florida	L 91–100 ^{2OT}	14–9 (6–4)	23 – Stanford	10 – Settle III	4 – Stanford	Yuengling Center (3,729); Tampa, FL
February 9, 2025; 2:00 p.m., ESPN2		at No. 17 Memphis	L 82–90	14–10 (6–5)	18 – Tobiason	5 – Settle III	5 – Berry	FedExForum (11,007); Memphis, TN
February 12, 2025; 7:00 p.m., ESPN+		Tulsa	L 74–80	14–11 (6–6)	19 – Mashburn Jr.	10 – Gray	6 – Mashburn Jr.	Liacouras Center (2,663); Philadelphia, PA
February 16, 2025; 12:00 p.m., ESPN2		Florida Atlantic	L 81–83	14–12 (6–7)	18 – Settle	5 – Tied	3 – Tied	Liacouras Center (4,581); Philadelphia, PA
February 19, 2025; 3:00 p.m., ESPN+		at Charlotte	L 72–78 ^{OT}	14–13 (6–8)	26 – Stanford	6 – Settle	2 – Dezonie	Dale F. Halton Arena (2,055); Charlotte, NC
February 23, 2025; 2:00 p.m., ESPNU		at UAB	L 64–80	14–14 (6–9)	17 – Stanford	8 – Stanford	4 – Tobiason	Bartow Arena (4,112); Birmingham, AL
February 26, 2025; 7:00 p.m., ESPN+		South Florida	W 73–71	15–14 (7–9)	25 – Stanford	9 – Dezonie	4 – Durodola	Liacouras Center (3,311); Philadelphia, PA
March 4, 2025; 8:00 p.m., ESPN+		at Tulsa	W 81–77	16–14 (8–9)	20 – Stanford	8 – Settle	5 – Stanford	Reynolds Center (3,049); Tulsa, OK
March 9, 2025; 2:00 p.m., ESPN+		North Texas	W 66–61	17–14 (9–9)	15 – Settle	7 – Tied	4 – Stanford	Liacouras Center (3,276); Philadelphia, PA
AAC Tournament
March 13, 2025; 7:00 p.m., ESPNU	(7)	vs. (10) Tulsa; Second round	L 71–75	17–15	22 – Settle	7 – Stanford	5 – Stanford	Dickies Arena; Fort Worth, TX
*Non-conference game. ^{#}Rankings from AP Poll. (#) Tournament seedings in parentheses. All times are in Eastern Time.
