= Jamal Mashburn Jr. =

American basketball player (born 2001)

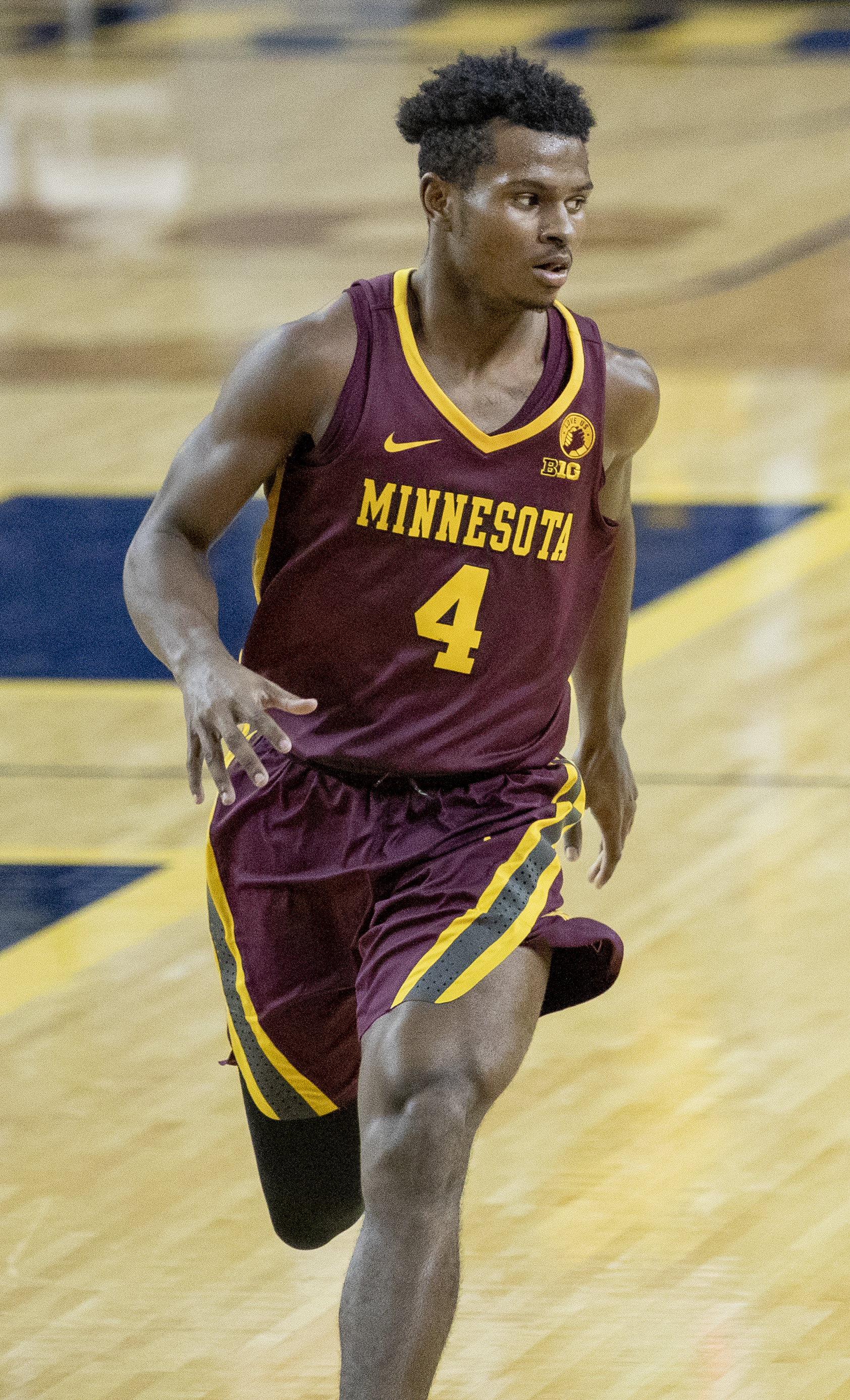
- Mashburn with Minnesota in 2021

Free agent
- Position: Point guard / shooting guard

Personal information
- Born: September 29, 2001 (age 25) Miami, Florida, U.S.
- Listed height: 6 ft 2 in (1.88 m)
- Listed weight: 195 lb (88 kg)

Career information
- High school: Gulliver Prep (Pinecrest, Florida); Brewster Academy (Wolfeboro, New Hampshire)
- College: Minnesota (2020–2021); New Mexico (2021–2024); Temple (2024–2025)
- NBA draft: 2025: undrafted
- Playing career: 2025–present

Career history
- 2025: Westchester Knicks
- 2026: Long Island Nets

Career highlights
- First-team All-Mountain West (2023); Third-team All-Mountain West (2022)

Jamal Mashburn Jr. (born September 29, 2001) is an American professional basketball player who last played for the Long Island Nets of the NBA G League. He played college basketball for the Minnesota Golden Gophers, New Mexico Lobos, and Temple Owls.

== Early life and high school career ==
Mashburn is the son of former NBA player Jamal Mashburn. The younger Mashburn grew up playing baseball and lacrosse, and only turned to basketball at age 10. He began his high school career at Gulliver Prep and averaged 24 points per game as a freshman. As a sophomore, Mashburn averaged 27.4 points per game. He earned first-team all-state honors. For his junior season, Mashburn transferred to Brewster Academy. At Brewster Academy, he played alongside teammates Kai Jones, Jalen Lecque, Terrence Clarke, and Kadary Richmond. As a senior, he earned first team All-New England Prep School Class AAA honors and led Brewster to the National Prep Showcase championship game, which was cancelled due to the COVID-19 pandemic. Mashburn was regarded as a four-star prospect ranked the No. 88 recruit in his class and committed to Minnesota over offers from California, Auburn, Georgetown, and Saint Louis.

== College career ==
On February 17, 2021, Mashburn scored a freshman season-high 19 points in an 82–72 loss to Indiana. He began receiving more playing time due to an injury to Gabe Kalscheur. Mashburn made eight starts as a freshman at Minnesota and averaged 8.2 points, 1.6 rebounds and 1.6 assists per game. For his sophomore season, he transferred to New Mexico. Mashburn followed his coach Richard Pitino, who was hired to coach the Lobos. On January 8, 2022, Mashburn scored a career-high 29 points and had eight assists in a 90–87 overtime loss to Nevada. He was named to the Third Team All-Mountain West as a sophomore. As a junior, Mashburn led the league in scoring at 19.1 points per game and was named to the First Team All-Mountain West.

In April 2024, Mashburn transferred to Temple. On November 23, he scored his 2,000th point in a win against UMass. Mashburn averaged 22.0 points, 3.0 rebounds and 2.2 assists per game but was sidelined by a lower body injury.

== Professional career ==
=== Westchester Knicks (2025) ===
On October 15, 2025, Mashburn was selected with the 8th pick in the 2025 NBA G League draft by the Westchester Knicks, but was immediately traded to the Grand Rapids Gold. However, he did not make the final roster for the Gold as he was waived on November 6, 2025. On November 29, 2025, Mashburn was re-acquired by Westchester as part of a Hardship Exception via the available player pool. On December 15, 2025, Westchester placed Mashburn on waivers.

=== Long Island Nets (2026) ===
On January 7, 2026, Mashburn was acquired from the available player pool by the Long Island Nets.

== Career statistics ==
Legend
GP	Games played	GS	Games started	MPG	Minutes per game
FG%	Field goal percentage	3P%	3-point field goal percentage	FT%	Free throw percentage
RPG	Rebounds per game	APG	Assists per game	SPG	Steals per game
BPG	Blocks per game	PPG	Points per game	**Bold**	Career high

=== College ===
Year	Team	GP	GS	MPG	FG%	3P%	FT%	RPG	APG	SPG	BPG	PPG
2020–21	Minnesota	29	8	22.1	.350	.276	.796	1.6	1.6	.4	.1	8.2
2021–22	New Mexico	32	32	33.9	.428	.342	.787	2.7	2.1	.6	.1	18.2
2022–23	New Mexico	34	34	33.6	.428	.382	.817	3.2	2.1	.7	.1	19.1
2023–24	New Mexico	28	28	29.4	.360	.317	.847	2.1	1.5	.4	.1	14.1
2024–25	Temple	23	23	36.0	.429	.431	.790	3.0	2.2	.7	.0	22.0
