= 2025 American Athletic Conference men's basketball tournament =

- Classification: Division I
- Season: 2024–25
- Teams: 13
- Site: Super Pit and Dickies Arena; Denton, Texas and Fort Worth, Texas
- Champions: Memphis (2nd title)
- Winning coach: Penny Hardaway (2nd title)
- Attendance: 28,275 (total); 5,119 (championship)
- Television: ESPN+, ESPNU, ESPN2, ESPN

2024–25 American Athletic Conference men's basketball standings
	Conf.				Overall
Team	W		L	PCT	W		L	PCT
No. 25 Memphis †	16	–	2	.889	29	–	6	.829
North Texas	14	–	4	.778	27	–	9	.750
UAB	13	–	5	.722	24	–	13	.649
Tulane	12	–	6	.667	19	–	15	.559
Florida Atlantic	10	–	8	.556	18	–	16	.529
East Carolina	10	–	8	.556	19	–	14	.576
Temple	9	–	9	.500	17	–	15	.531
Wichita State	8	–	10	.444	19	–	15	.559
South Florida	6	–	12	.333	13	–	19	.406
Tulsa	6	–	12	.333	13	–	20	.394
UTSA	6	–	12	.333	12	–	19	.387
Rice	4	–	14	.222	13	–	19	.406
Charlotte	3	–	15	.167	11	–	22	.333
† 2025 AAC tournament winner Rankings from AP Poll

The 2025 American Athletic Conference men's basketball tournament was the postseason men's basketball tournament for the American Athletic Conference for the 2024–25 season. The tournament was held from March 12–16, 2025, at Dickies Arena in Fort Worth, Texas. The winner, Memphis, received the conference's automatic bid to the 2025 NCAA tournament.

This was the last conference tournament under the American Athletic Conference name. In July 2025, the conference dropped the word "Athletic" from its name, renaming itself the American Conference.

== Seeds ==
All 13 conference teams participated in the tournament. Teams were seeded by conference record. The top four teams received byes to the quarterfinals.

Tiebreakers were applied as needed to properly seed the teams.

Seed	School	Conference record	Tiebreaker
1	Memphis	16–2	
2	North Texas	14–4	
3	UAB	13–5	
4	Tulane	12–6	
5	Florida Atlantic	10–8	2–0 vs. East Carolina
6	East Carolina	10–8	0–2 vs. Florida Atlantic
7	Temple	9–9	
8	Wichita State	8–10	
9	South Florida	6–12	2–0 vs. Tulsa/UTSA
10	Tulsa	6–12	2–1 vs. South Florida/UTSA
11	UTSA	6–12	0–3 vs. South Florida/Tulsa
12	Rice	4–14	
13	Charlotte	3–15	

== Schedule ==
Game	Time	Matchup	Score	Television	Attendance
First round – Wednesday, March 12
1	12:00 pm	No. 12 Rice vs. No. 13 Charlotte	61−64	ESPN+	497
Second round – Thursday, March 13
2	11:30 am	No. 8 Wichita State vs. No. 9 South Florida	73−68	ESPNU	4,162
3	1:30 pm	No. 5 Florida Atlantic vs. No. 13 Charlotte	64−59	ESPNU	4,162
4	6:00 pm	No. 7 Temple vs. No. 10 Tulsa	71−75	ESPNU	4,133
5	8:00 pm	No. 6 East Carolina vs. No. 11 UTSA	70−65	ESPNU	4,133
Quarterfinals – Friday, March 14
6	12:00 pm	No. 1 Memphis vs. No. 8 Wichita State	83−80	ESPN2	4,239
7	2:00 pm	No. 4 Tulane vs. No. 5 Florida Atlantic	83−76	ESPN2	4,239
8	6:00 pm	No. 2 North Texas vs. No. 10 Tulsa	77–59	ESPNU	4,285
9	8:00 pm	No. 3 UAB vs. No. 6 East Carolina	94–77	ESPNU	4,285
Semifinals – Saturday, March 15
10	2:00 pm	No. 1 Memphis vs. No. 4 Tulane	78–77	ESPN2	5,840
11	4:00 pm	No. 2 North Texas vs. No. 3 UAB	56–66	ESPN2	5,840
Championship – Sunday, March 16
12	2:15 pm	No. 1 Memphis vs. No. 3 UAB	84–72	ESPN	5,119
*Game times in CDT. ()-Rankings denote tournament seeding.

== Bracket ==
First round Wednesday, March 12
12	Rice	61
13	Charlotte	64

Second round Thursday, March 13
8	Wichita State	73
9	South Florida	68
5	Florida Atlantic	64
13	Charlotte	59
7	Temple	71
10	Tulsa	75
6	East Carolina	70
11	UTSA	65

Quarterfinals; Friday, March 14
1	16 Memphis	83
8	Wichita State	80
4	Tulane	83
5	Florida Atlantic	76
2	North Texas	77
10	Tulsa	59
3	UAB	94
6	East Carolina	77

Semifinals; Saturday, March 15
1	16 Memphis	78
4	Tulane	77
2	North Texas	56
3	UAB	66

Championship; Sunday, March 16
1	16 Memphis	84
3	UAB	72

== See also ==
- 2025 American Athletic Conference women's basketball tournament
- American Athletic Conference men's basketball tournament
- American Athletic Conference
