= 2024–25 Tulane Green Wave men's basketball team =

American college basketball season

2024–25 Tulane Green Wave men's basketball

College Basketball Crown, first round
- Conference: American Athletic Conference
- Record: 19–15 (12–6 AAC)
- Head coach: Ron Hunter (6th season)
- Associate head coach: Ray McCallum
- Assistant coaches: Claude Pardue; Sean Mock; Gebereal Baitey; R. J. Hunter
- Home arena: Devlin Fieldhouse

2024–25 American Athletic Conference men's basketball standings
| | Conf. | | | | Overall |
| Team | W | | L | PCT | W | | L | PCT |
|---|---|---|---|---|---|---|---|---|
| No. 25 Memphis † | 16 | – | 2 | .889 | 29 | – | 6 | .829 |
| North Texas | 14 | – | 4 | .778 | 27 | – | 9 | .750 |
| UAB | 13 | – | 5 | .722 | 24 | – | 13 | .649 |
| Tulane | 12 | – | 6 | .667 | 19 | – | 15 | .559 |
| Florida Atlantic | 10 | – | 8 | .556 | 18 | – | 16 | .529 |
| East Carolina | 10 | – | 8 | .556 | 19 | – | 14 | .576 |
| Temple | 9 | – | 9 | .500 | 17 | – | 15 | .531 |
| Wichita State | 8 | – | 10 | .444 | 19 | – | 15 | .559 |
| South Florida | 6 | – | 12 | .333 | 13 | – | 19 | .406 |
| Tulsa | 6 | – | 12 | .333 | 13 | – | 20 | .394 |
| UTSA | 6 | – | 12 | .333 | 12 | – | 19 | .387 |
| Rice | 4 | – | 14 | .222 | 13 | – | 19 | .406 |
| Charlotte | 3 | – | 15 | .167 | 11 | – | 22 | .333 |
† 2025 AAC tournament winner Rankings from AP Poll

The 2024–25 Tulane Green Wave men's basketball team represented Tulane University during the 2024–25 NCAA Division I men's basketball season. The Green Wave, led by sixth-year head coach Ron Hunter, played their home games at Devlin Fieldhouse in New Orleans, Louisiana as members of the American Athletic Conference (AAC).

They finished the season 19–15, 12–6 in AAC play, to finish in fourth place. They defeated Florida Atlantic in the quarterfinals of the AAC tournament, before being eliminated by top-seeded Memphis in the semifinals. They then lost to USC in the first round of the College Basketball Crown.

== Previous season ==
The Green Wave finished the 2023–24 season 14–17, 5–13 in AAC play, to finish in a five-way tie for tenth (last) place. As the No. 10 seed in the AAC tournament, they lost in the first round to North Texas.

== Offseason ==
=== Departures ===
Tulane departures
| Name | Number | Pos. | Height | Weight | Year | Hometown | Reason for departure |
|---|---|---|---|---|---|---|---|
| Sion James | 1 | G | 6' 5" | 205 | Junior | Sugar Hill, GA | Transferred to Duke |
| Mier Panoam | 3 | G | 6' 3" | 185 | Freshman | Anchorage, AK | Transferred to North Dakota |
| Collin Holloway | 5 | F | 6' 6" | 220 | Junior | Baton Rouge, LA | Transferred to Samford |
| Jordan Wood | 11 | F | 6' 9" | 205 | Senior | San Antonio, TX | Graduate transferred to Stetson |
| Kolby King | 12 | G | 6' 2" | 175 | Sophomore | Pembroke Pines, FL | Transferred to Butler |
| Tre' Williams | 13 | G | 6' 6" | 200 | Senior | Dallas, TX | Graduated |
| Max Bowman | 14 | G | 6' 0" | 175 | Junior | Newport Beach, CA | Walk-on; transferred |
| Kevin Cross Jr. | 24 | F | 6' 8" | 240 | Senior | Little Rock, AR | Graduated |
| Jaylen Forbes | 25 | G | 6' 5" | 185 | Senior | Florence, MS | Graduated |

=== Incoming transfers ===
Tulane incoming transfers
| Name | Number | Pos. | Height | Weight | Year | Hometown | Previous school |
|---|---|---|---|---|---|---|---|
| Tyler Ringgold | 0 | F | 6' 8" | 220 | (redshirt) Freshman | Baton Rouge, LA | Texas A&M |
| Kaleb Banks | 1 | F | 6' 7" | 215 | Junior | Hampton, GA | Indiana |
| Mari Jordan | 5 | F | 6' 6" | 190 | Sophomore | Atlanta, GA | Georgia |
| Rowan Brumbaugh | 7 | G | 6' 4" | 183 | (redshirt) Sophomore | Washington, D.C. | Georgetown |
| Michael Eley | 8 | G | 6' 4" | 178 | Junior | Fort Wayne, IN | Siena |
| Luke Rasmussen | 11 | G | 6' 7" | 195 | Sophomore | Haverford, PA | Lafaytette |

=== 2024 recruiting class ===
College recruiting information
| Name | Hometown | School | Height | Weight | Commit date |
|---|---|---|---|---|---|
| Kyle Greene #38 PG | Atlanta, GA | Pace Academy | 6 ft 3 in (1.91 m) | 185 lb (84 kg) | Apr 17, 2024 |
| Kyle Greene #38 PG | Recruit ratings: Rivals: 247Sports: ESPN: (81) | | | | |
| Kam Williams #41 SF | Lafayette, LA | Lafayette Christian Academy | 6 ft 6 in (1.98 m) | 185 lb (84 kg) | Oct 1, 2023 |
| Kam Williams #41 SF | Recruit ratings: Rivals: 247Sports: ESPN: (81) | | | | |
| Stefan Cicic; C | Riverside, IL | Riverside Brookfield High School | 7 ft 0 in (2.13 m) | 245 lb (111 kg) | May 9, 2024 |
| Stefan Cicic; C | Recruit ratings: Rivals: 247Sports: ESPN: (NR) | | | | |
Overall recruit ranking:
Note: In many cases, Scout, Rivals, 247Sports, On3, and ESPN may conflict in their listings of height and weight.; In these cases, the average was taken. ESPN grades are on a 100-point scale.; Sources: "2024 Team Ranking". Rivals.

== Roster ==
2024–25 Tulane Green Wave men's basketball team
Players
Coaches

| Pos. | # | Name | Height | Weight | Year | Previous school | Hometown |
|---|---|---|---|---|---|---|---|
| F | 0 | Tyler Ringgold | 6 ft 8 in (2.03 m) | 215 lb (98 kg) | RS Fr | Southern University Lab School; Texas A&M | Baton Rouge, LA |
| F | 1 | Kaleb Banks | 6 ft 7 in (2.01 m) | 215 lb (98 kg) | Jr | Fayette County; Indiana | Hampton, GA |
| F | 2 | Gregg Glenn III | 6 ft 7 in (2.01 m) | 230 lb (104 kg) | Jr | Calvary Christian Academy; Michigan | Fort Lauderdale, FL |
| G/F | 3 | Kam Williams | 6 ft 8 in (2.03 m) | 190 lb (86 kg) | Fr | Lafayette Christian Academy | Lafayette, LA |
| C | 4 | Spencer Elliott | 6 ft 10 in (2.08 m) | 215 lb (98 kg) | RS Fr | St. Pius Catholic | Atlanta, GA |
| G | 5 | Mari Jordan | 6 ft 5 in (1.96 m) | 190 lb (86 kg) | So | Norcross; Georgia | Atlanta, GA |
| G | 6 | Logan Stephens | 6 ft 1 in (1.85 m) | 200 lb (91 kg) | RS Jr | Woodward Academy; Rutgers | Decatur, GA |
| G | 7 | Rowan Brumbaugh | 6 ft 4 in (1.93 m) | 190 lb (86 kg) | RS So | Northfield Mount Hermon; Texas; Georgetown | Washington, D.C. |
| G | 8 | Michael Eley | 6 ft 4 in (1.93 m) | 180 lb (82 kg) | Jr | Veritas Prep Academy (FL); Siena | Fort Wayne, IN |
| G | 9 | KJ Greene | 6 ft 3 in (1.91 m) | 170 lb (77 kg) | Fr | Pace Academy | Atlanta, GA |
| G | 11 | Luke Rasmussen (W) | 6 ft 8 in (2.03 m) | 195 lb (88 kg) | So | The Hill School; Lafayette | Haverford, PA |
| G | 13 | Joseph Teich (W) | 5 ft 10 in (1.78 m) | 155 lb (70 kg) | Fr | Pinecrest School | Fort Lauderdale, FL |
| C | 14 | Stefan Čičić | 7 ft 0 in (2.13 m) | 260 lb (118 kg) | Fr | Riverside Brookfield | Riverside, IL |
| G | 22 | Asher Woods | 6 ft 3 in (1.91 m) | 190 lb (86 kg) | Jr | Parkview | Newnan, GA |
| C | 23 | Percy Daniels | 6 ft 10 in (2.08 m) | 220 lb (100 kg) | Jr | Madison Prep Academy | Baton Rouge, LA |
| G | 34 | Jake Shapiro (W) | 6 ft 1 in (1.85 m) | 190 lb (86 kg) | RS So | Windward School | Los Angeles, CA |

Head coach

- Ron Hunter (Miami (OH))

Assistant coach(es)

- Ray McCallum (Ball State)
- Claude Pardue (Emory)
- Sean Mock (Miami (OH))
- Gebereal Baitey (Emory)
- R. J. Hunter (Georgia State)

Legend

- (C) Team captain
- (S) Suspended
- (I) Ineligible
- (W) Walk-on
- Injured
- Current redshirt

Roster
Last update: August 7, 2025

| Pos. | Starting 5 | Bench |
|---|---|---|
| C | Gregg Glenn III | Percy Daniels |
| PF | Kaleb Banks |
| SF | Kam Williams | Tyler Ringold |
| SG | Asher Woods | Mari Jordan |
| PG | Rowan Brumbaugh | KJ Greene |

== Schedule and results ==
| Date time, TV | Rank^{#} | Opponent^{#} | Result | Record | High points | High rebounds | High assists | Site (attendance) city, state |
Exhibition
| October 25, 2024*; 6:30 p.m. | | Spring Hill | W 86–66 | | 20 – Glenn III | 8 – Glenn III | 4 – 2 tied | Devlin Fieldhouse (823); New Orleans, LA |
Non-conference regular season
| November 4, 2024*; 6:30 p.m., ESPN+ | | Louisiana Christian | W 76–42 | 1–0 | 18 – Jordan | 13 – Banks | 7 – Brumbaugh | Devlin Fieldhouse (1,175); New Orleans, LA |
| November 8, 2024*; 6:30 p.m., ESPN+ | | Louisiana–Monroe | W 80–64 | 2–0 | 22 – Brumbaugh | 12 – Banks | 4 – Glenn III | Devlin Fieldhouse (1,447); New Orleans, LA |
| November 11, 2024*; 6:30 p.m., ESPN+ | | Alcorn State | W 84–51 | 3–0 | 25 – Banks | 7 – Banks | 7 – Brumbaugh | Devlin Fieldhouse (1,202); New Orleans, LA |
| November 15, 2024*; 6:00 p.m., ESPN+ | | at Furman | L 67–75 | 3–1 | 17 – Woods | 10 – Glenn III | 5 – Brumbaugh | Bon Secours Wellness Arena (2,867); Greenville, SC |
| November 19, 2024*; 6:30 p.m., ESPN+ | | Bethune–Cookman; Cancún Challenge campus-site game | W 72–57 | 4–1 | 22 – Banks | 10 – 2 tied | 10 – Brumbaugh | Devlin Fieldhouse (1,168); New Orleans, LA |
| November 22, 2024*; 6:30 p.m., ESPN+ | | New Orleans | L 87–93 ^{OT} | 4–2 | 20 – Banks | 8 – 2 tied | 6 – Woods | Devlin Fieldhouse (1,293); New Orleans, LA |
| November 26, 2024*; 5:00 p.m., CBSSN | | vs. Wyoming; Cancún Challenge Riviera Division semifinals | L 63–64 | 4–3 | 15 – Woods | 10 – Banks | 4 – Brumbaugh | Hard Rock Hotel Riviera Maya (374); Cancún, Mexico |
| November 27, 2024*; 5:00 p.m., CBSSN | | vs. Belmont; Cancún Challenge Riviera Division consolation game | L 66–89 | 4–4 | 16 – Woods | 8 – Glenn III | 4 – Williams | Hard Rock Hotel Riviera Maya (389); Cancún, Mexico |
| December 2, 2024*; 6:30 p.m., ESPN+ | | Southeastern Louisiana | L 67–71 | 4–5 | 19 – Williams | 8 – Banks | 6 – Glenn III | Devlin Fieldhouse (1,269); New Orleans, LA |
| December 7, 2024*; 1:00 p.m., ESPN+ | | at George Mason | L 64–76 | 4–6 | 12 – Brumbaugh | 11 – Glenn III | 4 – Brumbaugh | EagleBank Arena (2,725); Fairfax, VA |
| December 10, 2024*; 7:30 p.m., ESPN+ | | Southern Miss | W 86–58 | 5–6 | 18 – Banks | 10 – Glenn III | 6 – Brumbaugh | Devlin Fieldhouse (1,254); New Orleans, LA |
| December 14, 2024*; 3:30 p.m., ACCN | | vs. Florida State; Orange Bowl Basketball Classic | L 64–77 | 5–7 | 33 – Banks | 16 – Banks | 4 – Greene | Amerant Bank Arena (7,866); Sunrise, FL |
| December 20, 2024*; 6:30 p.m., ESPN+ | | Dillard | W 99–56 | 6–7 | 21 – Banks | 13 – Banks | 8 – Brumbaugh | Devlin Fieldhouse (874); New Orleans, LA |
AAC regular season
| December 31, 2024; 1:00 p.m., ESPN+ | | at Charlotte | W 83–68 | 7–7 (1–0) | 21 – Banks | 9 – Glenn III | 5 – Glenn III | Dale F. Halton Arena (2,607); Charlotte, NC |
| January 4, 2025; 5:00 p.m., ESPNU | | UTSA | W 92–63 | 8–7 (2–0) | 24 – Banks | 8 – Glenn III | 7 – Glenn III | Devlin Fieldhouse (1,281); New Orleans, LA |
| January 7, 2025; 6:30 p.m., ESPN+ | | at UAB | L 69–81 | 8–8 (2–1) | 16 – 2 tied | 12 – Banks | 5 – Brumbaugh | Bartow Arena (3,142); Birmingham, AL |
| January 11, 2025; 1:00 p.m., ESPN+ | | South Florida | W 73–70 | 9–8 (3–1) | 15 – Woods | 7 – Glenn III | 6 – Glenn III | Devlin Fieldhouse (1,281); New Orleans, LA |
| January 15, 2025; 6:30 p.m., ESPN+ | | Florida Atlantic | W 80–65 | 10–8 (4–1) | 25 – Banks | 8 – Glenn III | 11 – Glenn III | Devlin Fieldhouse (1,679); New Orleans, LA |
| January 19, 2025; 12:00 p.m., ESPNU | | at Temple | L 77–80 | 10–9 (4–2) | 20 – Brumbaugh | 5 – Glenn III | 7 – Brumbaugh | Liacouras Center (2,910); Philadelphia, PA |
| January 25, 2025; 1:00 p.m., ESPNU | | at Rice | W 82–71 | 11–9 (5–2) | 17 – Glenn III | 6 – 3 tied | 3 – Glenn III | Tudor Fieldhouse (1,517); Houston, TX |
| January 30, 2025; 8:00 p.m., ESPN2 | | No. 19 Memphis | L 56–68 | 11–10 (5–3) | 19 – Brumbaugh | 7 – 2 tied | 4 – Brumbaugh | Devlin Fieldhouse (3,445); New Orleans, LA |
| February 2, 2025; 1:00 p.m., ESPNU | | Tulsa | W 59–56 | 12–10 (6–3) | 23 – Brumbaugh | 7 – Banks | 5 – Glenn III | Devlin Fieldhouse (1,232); New Orleans, LA |
| February 5, 2025; 7:00 p.m., ESPN+ | | at UTSA | W 61–60 | 13–10 (7–3) | 28 – Millender | 7 – Williams | 4 – Brumbaugh | Convocation Center (1,593); San Antonio, TX |
| February 8, 2025; 2:00 p.m., ESPN+ | | at North Texas | L 66–76 | 13–11 (7–4) | 20 – Woods | 7 – Banks | 3 – Brumbaugh | The Super Pit (4,156); Denton, TX |
| February 15, 2025; 11:00 a.m., ESPN+ | | Rice | W 81–78 | 14–11 (8–4) | 25 – Brumbaugh | 6 – 3 tied | 8 – Brumbaugh | Devlin Fieldhouse; New Orleans, LA |
| February 19, 2025; 6:30 p.m., ESPN+ | | East Carolina | W 86–81 | 15–11 (9–4) | 25 – Banks | 10 – Williams | 7 – Brumbaugh | Devlin Fieldhouse (1,454); New Orleans, LA |
| February 23, 2025; 1:00 p.m., ESPN+ | | at Wichita State | L 67–78 | 15–12 (9–5) | 18 – 2 tied | 7 – Banks | 2 – Brumbaugh | Charles Koch Arena (6,350); Wichita, KS |
| February 26, 2025; 6:30 p.m., ESPN+ | | Charlotte | W 78–64 | 16–12 (10–5) | 24 – Banks | 7 – Banks | 4 – 2 tied | Devlin Fieldhouse (1,468); New Orleans, LA |
| March 1, 2025; 1:00 p.m., ESPNU | | at Tulsa | W 79–77 | 17–12 (11–5) | 22 – Glenn III | 7 – Brumbaugh | 7 – Brumbaugh | Reynolds Center (3,084); Tulsa, OK |
| March 6, 2025; 6:00 p.m., ESPN+ | | at East Carolina | L 64–73 | 17–13 (11–6) | 21 – Woods | 6 – Glenn III | 5 – Glenn III | Williams Arena (4,343); Greenville, NC |
| March 9, 2025; 1:00 p.m., ESPN+ | | UAB | W 85–68 | 18–13 (12–6) | 24 – Williams | 7 – Glenn III | 11 – Brumbaugh | Devlin Fieldhouse (1,573); New Orleans, LA |
AAC tournament
| March 14, 2025; 2:00 p.m., ESPN2 | (4) | vs. (5) Florida Atlantic; Quarterfinals | W 83–76 | 19–13 | 20 – Woods | 8 – Jordan | 7 – Brumbaugh | Dickies Arena (4,239); Fort Worth, TX |
| March 15, 2025; 2:00 p.m., ESPN2 | (4) | vs. (1) No. 16 Memphis; Semifinals | L 77–78 | 19–14 | 22 – Brumbaugh | 8 – Williams | 7 – Glenn III | Dickies Arena; Fort Worth, TX |
College Basketball Crown
| April 1, 2025*; 10:00 p.m., FS1 | | vs. USC; First round | L 60–89 | 19–15 | 18 – Woods | 5 – 2 tied | 7 – Brumbaugh | MGM Grand Garden Arena (2,407); Paradise, NV |
*Non-conference game. ^{#}Rankings from AP poll. (#) Tournament seedings in parentheses. All times are in Central.
