= 2024–25 Charlotte 49ers men's basketball team =

American college basketball season

2024–25 Charlotte 49ers men's basketball
- Conference: American Athletic Conference
- Record: 11–22 (3–15 AAC)
- Head coach: Aaron Fearne (2nd season)
- Assistant coaches: Vic Sfera; Kevin Smith; Ben Johnson
- Home arena: Dale F. Halton Arena

2024–25 American Athletic Conference men's basketball standings
	Conf.				Overall
Team	W		L	PCT	W		L	PCT
No. 25 Memphis †	16	–	2	.889	29	–	6	.829
North Texas	14	–	4	.778	27	–	9	.750
UAB	13	–	5	.722	24	–	13	.649
Tulane	12	–	6	.667	19	–	15	.559
Florida Atlantic	10	–	8	.556	18	–	16	.529
East Carolina	10	–	8	.556	19	–	14	.576
Temple	9	–	9	.500	17	–	15	.531
Wichita State	8	–	10	.444	19	–	15	.559
South Florida	6	–	12	.333	13	–	19	.406
Tulsa	6	–	12	.333	13	–	20	.394
UTSA	6	–	12	.333	12	–	19	.387
Rice	4	–	14	.222	13	–	19	.406
Charlotte	3	–	15	.167	11	–	22	.333
† 2025 AAC tournament winner Rankings from AP Poll

The 2024–25 Charlotte 49ers men's basketball team represented the University of North Carolina at Charlotte during the 2024–25 NCAA Division I men's basketball season. The team, led by second-year head coach Aaron Fearne, played their home games at Dale F. Halton Arena in Charlotte, North Carolina, in their second season as members in the American Athletic Conference.

== Previous season ==
The 49ers finished the 2023–24 season with a record of 19–12, 13–5 in AAC play to finish in third place. They lost in the quarterfinals of the AAC tournament to Temple.

== Offseason ==
=== Departures ===
Name	Number	Pos.	Height	Weight	Year	Hometown	Reason for departure
Dishon Jackson	1	C	6'11"	260	(redshirt) Sophomore	Oakland, CA	Transferred to Iowa State
Sterling Young	3	G	6'1"	175	(redshirt) Junior	Queens, NY	Transferred to Florida A&M
Daylen Berry	11	G	6'4"	175	(redshirt) Sophomore	Cary, NC	Transferred to Charleston Southern
Jackson Threadgill	12	G	6'6"	200	Senior	Concord, NC	Graduate transferred to Appalachian State
Igor Milicic Jr.	24	F	6'10"	225	Junior	Rovinj, Croatia	Transferred to Tennessee
Lu'Cye Patterson	25	G	6'2"	205	(redshirt) Junior	Minneapolis, MN	Transferred to Minnesota
Iaroslav Niagu	99	F	7'0"	235	Sophomore	Krasnodar, Russia	Transferred to Jacksonville State

=== Incoming transfers ===
Name	Number	Pos.	Height	Weight	Year	Hometown	Previous school
Giancarlo Rosado	1	F	6'8"	247	Senior	West Palm Beach, FL	Florida Atlantic
Kylan Blackmon	7	G	6'3"	200	(redshirt) Senior	Oxford, MS	Coastal Carolina
Aleks Szymczyk	11	F	6'10"	250	(redshirt) Sophomore	Frankfurt, Germany	Florida
Jaehshon Thomas	22	G	6'2"	190	Sophomore	Aurora, IL	Florida SouthWestern State College
Jeremiah Oden	25	F	6'8"	201	(redshirt) Senior	Chicago, IL	DePaul
Nika Metskhvarishvili	77	F	6'8"	240	GS Senior	Tbilisi, Georgia	Louisiana–Monroe

=== 2024 recruiting class ===
College recruiting information
Name	Hometown	School	Height	Weight	Commit date
Ben Bradford; SG	Gaithersburg, MD	The Loomis Chaffee School	6 ft 4 in (1.93 m)	N/A	Jun 17, 2024
Ben Bradford; SG	Recruit ratings: Scout: Rivals: 247Sports: (NR)				
Overall recruit ranking:
Note: In many cases, Scout, Rivals, 247Sports, On3, and ESPN may conflict in their listings of height and weight.; In these cases, the average was taken. ESPN grades are on a 100-point scale.; Sources: "2024 Team Ranking". Rivals.

== Roster ==
2024–25 Charlotte 49ers men's basketball team
Players
Coaches

Pos.	#	Name	Height	Weight	Year	Previous school	Hometown
F	1	Giancarlo Rosado	6 ft 8 in (2.03 m)	240 lb (109 kg)	Sr	Florida Atlanitc	West Palm Beach, FL
F	2	Andrew Bailey	6 ft 6 in (1.98 m)	210 lb (95 kg)	So	SV Böblingen Panthers	Ramstein, Germany
G	3	Ben Bradford	6 ft 5 in (1.96 m)	200 lb (91 kg)	Fr	Gaithersburg High School	Gaithersburg, MD
G	5	Isaiah Folkes	6 ft 4 in (1.93 m)	200 lb (91 kg)	Sr	Middleburg Academy	Gainesville, VA
G	7	Kylan Blackmon	6 ft 3 in (1.91 m)	200 lb (91 kg)	RS Sr	Northeast Mississippi Community College	Oxford, MS
G	10	Nik Graves	6 ft 3 in (1.91 m)	195 lb (88 kg)	Jr	Greensboro Day School	Durham, NC
F	11	Aleks Szymczyk	6 ft 10 in (2.08 m)	250 lb (113 kg)	RS So	Florida	Frankfurt, Germany
F	20	Robert Braswell IV	6 ft 7 in (2.01 m)	210 lb (95 kg)	GS	Syracuse	Jacksonville, FL
F	21	Dean Reiber	6 ft 10 in (2.08 m)	235 lb (107 kg)	RS Sr	Rutgers	Greensboro, NC
G	22	Jaehshon Thomas	6 ft 3 in (1.91 m)	195 lb (88 kg)	Jr	Florida SouthWestern State College	Aurora, IL
F	24	Rich Rolf	6 ft 7 in (2.01 m)	210 lb (95 kg)	RS So	Centerville High School	Centerville, OH
F	25	Jeremiah Oden	6 ft 9 in (2.06 m)	215 lb (98 kg)	RS Sr	DePaul	Chicago, IL
F	31	Nick Richart	6 ft 10 in (2.08 m)	235 lb (107 kg)	So	Zionsville High School	Zionsville, IN
G	35	Tyler Fearne (W)	6 ft 6 in (1.98 m)	190 lb (86 kg)	RS Jr	Concord Academy	Cairns, Australia
F	77	Nika Metskhvarishvili	6 ft 8 in (2.03 m)	225 lb (102 kg)	GS	Louisiana–Monroe	Tbilisi, Georgia

Head coach

- Aaron Fearne (Mayville State)

Assistant coach(es)

- Vic Sfera (Memphis)
- Kevin Smith (Richmond)
- Ben Johnson (Green Bay)

Legend

- (C) Team captain
- (S) Suspended
- (I) Ineligible
- (W) Walk-on
- Injured
- Current redshirt

Roster

== Schedule and results ==
Date time, TV	Rank^{#}	Opponent^{#}	Result	Record	High points	High rebounds	High assists	Site (attendance) city, state
Exhibition
October 19, 2024*; 12:00 p.m.		Georgia; Charity Exhibition	L 59–86	–	–	–	–	Dale F. Halton Arena; Charlotte, NC
Non-conference regular season
November 4, 2024*; 8:00 p.m., ESPN+		Presbyterian	W 88–79	1–0	18 – Tied	8 – Rosado	5 – Rosado	Dale F. Halton Arena (3,343); Charlotte, NC
November 9, 2024*; 7:00 p.m., MWN		at Utah State	L 74–103	1–1	20 – Braswell IV	4 – Tied	4 – Graves	Smith Spectrum (7,859); Logan, UT
November 13, 2024*; 7:00 p.m., ESPN+		Richmond	W 65–48	2–1	23 – Graves	10 – Rosado	5 – Rosado	Dale F. Halton Arena (3,097); Charlotte, NC
November 19, 2024*; 7:00 p.m., ESPN+		Gardner–Webb	W 60–56	3–1	12 – Tied	8 – Rosado	5 – Rosado	Dale F. Halton Arena (2,956); Charlotte, NC
November 23, 2024*; 12:30 p.m., ESPN+		LIU	L 76–79	3–2	20 – Graves	10 – Rosado	3 – Graves	Dale F. Halton Arena (2,321); Charlotte, NC
November 27, 2024*; 2:00 p.m., ESPN+		East Tennessee State	L 55–75	3–3	13 – Tied	5 – Blackmon	4 – Folkes	Dale F. Halton Arena (2,117); Charlotte, NC
December 4, 2024*; 7:00 p.m., ESPN+		Livingstone	W 83–61	4–3	13 – Tied	7 – Tied	5 – Tied	Dale F. Halton Arena (2,432); Charlotte, NC
December 10, 2024*; 7:00 p.m., ESPN+		at Davidson	L 71–75	4–4	23 – Graves	7 – Reiber	3 – Graves	John M. Belk Arena (3,126); Davidson, NC
December 14, 2024*; 2:00 p.m., ESPN+		at Georgia State	W 77–63	5–4	19 – Braswell IV	7 – Thomas	7 – Reiber	Georgia State Convocation Center (1,490); Atlanta, GA
December 17, 2024*; 7:00 p.m., ESPN+		West Georgia	W 75–70	6–4	20 – Tied	4 – Tied	2 – Tied	Dale F. Halton Arena (2,058); Charlotte, NC
December 22, 2024*; 11:30 p.m., ESPN2		at Hawaiʻi; Diamond Head Classic Quarterfinals	L 61–78	6–5	16 – Thomas	6 – Graves	3 – Rosado	Stan Sheriff Center (5,049); Honolulu, HI
December 24, 2024*; 12:30 a.m., ESPN2		vs. Murray State; Diamond Head Classic Consolation	W 94–90 ^{2OT}	7–5	31 – Graves	8 – Graves	4 – Graves	Stan Sheriff Center (4,611); Honolulu, HI
December 25, 2024*; 3:30 p.m., ESPN2		vs. Charleston; Diamond Head Classic 5th Place Game	L 81–84	7–6	23 – Thomas	9 – Tied	5 – Graves	Stan Sheriff Center (4,163); Honolulu, HI
AAC regular season
December 31, 2024; 2:00 p.m., ESPN+		Tulane	L 68–83	7–7 (0–1)	14 – Graves	9 – Reiber	4 – Graves	Dale F. Halton Arena (2,607); Charlotte, NC
January 4, 2025; 3:00 p.m., ESPN+		at Rice	L 55–68	7–8 (0–2)	23 – Graves	11 – Graves	3 – Folkes	Tudor Fieldhouse (1,316); Houston, TX
January 8, 2025; 7:00 p.m., ESPN+		Florida Atlantic	L 64–75	7–9 (0–3)	14 – Tied	6 – Thomas	3 – Graves	Dale F. Halton Arena (2,164); Charlotte, NC
January 12, 2025; 3:30 p.m., ESPN+		at Tulsa	L 63–69	7–10 (0–4)	19 – Graves	7 – Rosado	3 – Tied	Reynolds Center (3,046); Tulsa, OK
January 14, 2025; 7:30 p.m., ESPN+		at Wichita State	L 59–68	7–11 (0–5)	13 – Graves	8 – Rosado	4 – Rosado	Charles Koch Arena (5,359); Wichita, KS
January 19, 2025; 3:00 p.m., ESPN2		No. 18 Memphis	L 68–77	7–12 (0–6)	18 – Thomas	7 – Rosado	4 – Rosado	Dale F. Halton Arena (3,855); Charlotte, NC
January 22, 2025; 7:00 p.m., ESPN+		South Florida	W 69–61	8–12 (1–6)	19 – Graves	11 – Rosado	9 – Rosado	Dale F. Halton Arena (2,707); Charlotte, NC
January 29, 2025; 7:00 p.m., ESPN+		at Temple	L 89–90 ^{2OT}	8–13 (1–7)	26 – Graves	10 – Rolf	8 – Graves	Liacouras Center (3,007); Philadelphia, PA
February 1, 2025; 2:00 p.m., ESPN+		at UAB	L 78–96	8–14 (1–8)	17 – Rosado	5 – Braswell IV	10 – Rosado	Bartow Arena (4,284); Birmingham, AL
February 4, 2025; 7:00 p.m., ESPNU		Wichita State	L 58–66	8–15 (1–9)	23 – Graves	6 – Tied	4 – Rosado	Dale F. Halton Arena (2,638); Charlotte, NC
February 8, 2025; 4:00 p.m., ESPN+		Rice	W 78–75	9–15 (2–9)	21 – Thomas	7 – Graves	4 – Rosado	Dale F. Halton Arena (3,388); Charlotte, NC
February 10, 2025; 9:00 p.m., ESPN2		at Florida Atlantic	L 75–87	9–16 (2–10)	20 – Braswell	7 – Graves	4 – Tied	Eleanor R. Baldwin Arena (3,161); Boca Raton, FL
February 15, 2025; 4:00 p.m., ESPNews		East Carolina	L 59–75	9–17 (2–11)	15 – Rosado	4 – Tied	2 – Tied	Dale F. Halton Arena (4,578); Charlotte, NC
February 19, 2025; 3:00 p.m., ESPN+		Temple	W 78–72 ^{OT}	10–17 (3–11)	23 – Graves	7 – Rosado	6 – Graves	Dale F. Halton Arena (2,055); Charlotte, NC
February 26, 2025; 7:30 p.m., ESPN+		at Tulane	L 64–78	10–18 (3–12)	12 – Rosado	9 – Thomas	2 – Tied	Devlin Fieldhouse (1,468); New Orleans, LA
March 2, 2025; 12:00 p.m., ESPNU		at East Carolina	L 76–78	10–19 (3–13)	32 – Graves	6 – Tied	6 – Folkes	Williams Arena (5,115); Greenville, NC
March 6, 2025; 9:00 p.m., ESPN2		at North Texas	L 64–75	10–20 (3–14)	20 – Graves	10 – Rosado	4 – Blackmon	The Super Pit (4,199); Denton, TX
March 9, 2025; 4:00 p.m., ESPN+		UTSA	L 80–83	10–21 (3–15)	22 – Blackmon	7 – Tied	4 – Rosado	Dale F. Halton Arena (2,528); Charlotte, NC
AAC tournament
March 12, 2025; 1:00 p.m., ESPN+	(13)	vs. (12) Rice; First round	W 64–61	11–21	18 – Tied	6 – Tied	3 – Rosado	The Super Pit (497); Denton, TX
March 13, 2025; 2:30 p.m., ESPNU/ESPN+	(13)	vs. (5) Florida Atlantic; Second round	L 59–64	11–22	14 – Graves	7 – Tied	4 – Graves	Dickies Arena (4,162); Fort Worth, TX
*Non-conference game. ^{#}Rankings from AP Poll. (#) Tournament seedings in parentheses. All times are in Eastern.

== See also ==
- 2024–25 Charlotte 49ers women's basketball team
