= 2024–25 UTSA Roadrunners men's basketball team =

American college basketball season

2024–25 UTSA Roadrunners men's basketball
- Conference: American Athletic Conference
- Record: 12–19 (6–12 AAC)
- Head coach: Austin Claunch (1st season)
- Assistant coaches: Nick Bowman; Joey Brooks; Trevor DeLoach; Joseph Jones; Robby Benavides
- Home arena: Convocation Center

2024–25 American Athletic Conference men's basketball standings
	Conf.				Overall
Team	W		L	PCT	W		L	PCT
No. 25 Memphis †	16	–	2	.889	29	–	6	.829
North Texas	14	–	4	.778	27	–	9	.750
UAB	13	–	5	.722	24	–	13	.649
Tulane	12	–	6	.667	19	–	15	.559
Florida Atlantic	10	–	8	.556	18	–	16	.529
East Carolina	10	–	8	.556	19	–	14	.576
Temple	9	–	9	.500	17	–	15	.531
Wichita State	8	–	10	.444	19	–	15	.559
South Florida	6	–	12	.333	13	–	19	.406
Tulsa	6	–	12	.333	13	–	20	.394
UTSA	6	–	12	.333	12	–	19	.387
Rice	4	–	14	.222	13	–	19	.406
Charlotte	3	–	15	.167	11	–	22	.333
† 2025 AAC tournament winner Rankings from AP Poll

The 2024–25 UTSA Roadrunners men's basketball team represented the University of Texas at San Antonio in the 2024–25 NCAA Division I men's basketball season. The Roadrunners, led by 1st-year head coach Austin Claunch, played their home games at Convocation Center in San Antonio, Texas as 2nd-year members of the American Athletic Conference (AAC).

== Previous season ==
The Roadrunners finished the 2023-24 season 11–21, 5–13 in conference play to finish in last place in their first year in the AAC. As the 14th seed in the AAC tournament, they would play and lose in the first round to 11th seed Temple.

The season marked the team's second year as a member of American Athletic Conference after being in Conference USA (C-USA) from 2013 to 2023.

== Offseason ==
=== Departures ===
Name	Number	Pos.	Height	Weight	Year	Hometown	Reason for departure
Jordan Ivy-Curry	1	G	6' 3"	175	Junior	La Marque, TX	Transferred to UCF
Carlton Linguard Jr.	2	C	7' 0"	225	RS Senior	San Antonio, TX	Transferred to San Francisco
Trey Edmonds	3	F/C	6' 10"	255	Junior	Aurora, CO	Transferred to Minnesota
Dre Fuller Jr.	4	G	6' 6"	220	Graduate Student	Fayetteville, NC	Graduated
Adante' Holiman	5	PG	6' 0"	175	Sophomore	McAlester, Oklahoma	Transferred to Georgia Southern
Chandler Cuthrell	10	F	6' 8"	220	Junior	Baltimore, MD	Transferred to Purdue Fort Wayne
Isaiah Wyatt	11	G/F	6' 4"	220	RS Junior	Toledo, OH	Graduated
Josh Reid	12	F	6' 7"	220	Junior	Havelock, NC	Transferred to St. Mary's (TX)
Massal Diouf	14	F	6' 9"	240	Sophomore	Gouda, Netherlands	Transferred to Western Illinois
Juan Reyna	20	PG	6' 3"	185	Junior	San Antonio, TX	Transferred to Jackson State
PJ Carter	21	G	6' 5"	175	Junior	Atlanta, GA	Transferred to Memphis
Christian Tucker	22	G	6' 3"	178	Junior	Chandler, AZ	Transferred to California
Blessing Adesipe	23	G/F	6' 6"	210	Junior	Houston, TX	Transferred to Angelo State
Justin Thomas	25	G	6' 7"	180	Junior	Baton Rouge, LA	Transferred to Florida State

=== Incoming transfers ===
Name	Number	Pos.	Height	Weight	Year	Hometown	Previous school
Primo Spears	1	G	6' 3"	185	Senior	Hartford, CT	Florida State
Jaquan Scott	2	F/C	6' 8"	230	Senior	Dallas, TX	Mississippi State
Tai'Reon Joseph	3	G	6' 3"	180	RS Senior	Baton Rouge, LA	Southern
Marcus "Smurf" Millender	4	PG	5' 11"	180	Sophomore	Houston, TX	South Alabama
Raekwon Horton	5	F/G	6' 6"	215	Senior	Santee, SC	James Madison
Mo Njie	C	C	6' 11"	250	Senior	Centerville, OH	SMU
Paul Lewis	7	G	6' 2"	180	Junior	Woodbridge, VA	Vanderbilt
Damari Monsanto	12	G	6' 6"	225	Graduate Student	Pembroke Pines, FL	Wake Forest
LJ Brown	13	G	6' 1"	175	Senior	San Antonio, TX	Presentation College
David Hermes	14	F/C	6' 10"	225	Junior	Stockholm, Sweden	Indian Hills CC
Jonnivius Smith	15	F/C	6' 9"	200	RS Senior	Selma, AL	Buffalo
Jackson Fazande	25	F	6' 5"	185	RS Freshman	Houston, TX	St. Mary's (TX)
Zach Gonsoulin	30	G	6' 1"	175	Junior	Houston, TX	TCU
Skylar Wicks	88	G/F	6' 6"	190	RS Senior	Jersey City, NJ	Incarnate Word

=== 2024 recruiting class ===
College recruiting information
Name	Hometown	School	Height	Weight	Commit date
Baboucarr Njie; PF	Centerville, OH	Centerville High School	6 ft 5 in (1.96 m)	185 lb (84 kg)	
Baboucarr Njie; PF	Recruit ratings: No ratings found				
Overall recruit ranking:
Note: In many cases, Scout, Rivals, 247Sports, On3, and ESPN may conflict in their listings of height and weight.; In these cases, the average was taken. ESPN grades are on a 100-point scale.; Sources: "2024 Team Ranking". Rivals.

== Roster ==
2024–25 UTSA Roadrunners men's basketball team
Players
Coaches

Pos.	#	Name	Height	Weight	Year	Previous school	Hometown
G	0	Nazar Mahmoud	6 ft 5 in (1.96 m)	195 lb (88 kg)	So	Spring Creek Academy	Leander, TX
G	1	Primo Spears	6 ft 3 in (1.91 m)	185 lb (84 kg)	Sr	Florida State	Hartford, CT
F/C	2	Jaquan Scott	6 ft 8 in (2.03 m)	230 lb (104 kg)	Sr	Mississippi State	Dallas, TX
G	3	Tai'Reon Joseph	6 ft 3 in (1.91 m)	180 lb (82 kg)	RS Sr	Southern	Baton Rouge, LA
G	4	Marcus Millender	5 ft 11 in (1.8 m)	180 lb (82 kg)	So	South Alabama	Houston, TX
G/F	5	Raekwon Horton	6 ft 6 in (1.98 m)	215 lb (98 kg)	Sr	James Madison	Santee, SC
C	6	Mo Njie	6 ft 11 in (2.11 m)	250 lb (113 kg)	Sr	SMU	Centerville, OH
G	7	Paul Lewis	6 ft 2 in (1.88 m)	180 lb (82 kg)	Jr	Vanderbilt	Woodbridge, VA
G	12	Damari Monsanto	6 ft 6 in (1.98 m)	225 lb (102 kg)	GS	Wake Forest	Pembroke Pines, FL
G	13	LJ Brown	6 ft 1 in (1.85 m)	175 lb (79 kg)	Sr	Presentation College	San Antonio, TX
F/C	14	David Hermes	6 ft 10 in (2.08 m)	225 lb (102 kg)	Jr	Indian Hills CC	Stockholm, Sweden
F/C	15	Jonnivius Smith	6 ft 9 in (2.06 m)	200 lb (91 kg)	RS Sr	Buffalo	Selma, AL
G/F	24	Baboucarr Njie	6 ft 5 in (1.96 m)	185 lb (84 kg)	Fr	Centerville High School	Centerville, OH
F	25	Jackson Fazande	6 ft 3 in (1.91 m)	245 lb (111 kg)	RS Fr	St. Mary's (TX)	Houston, TX
G	30	Zach Gonsoulin	6 ft 1 in (1.85 m)	175 lb (79 kg)	Jr	TCU	Houston, TX
G/F	88	Skylar Wicks	6 ft 6 in (1.98 m)	190 lb (86 kg)	RS Sr	Incarnate Word	Jersey City, NJ

Head coach

- Austin Claunch (Emory)

Assistant coach(es)

- Nick Bowman (Eastern Kentucky)
- Joey Brooks (Strake Jesuit College)
- Trevor DeLoach (UNC Wilmington)
- Joseph Jones (Texas A&M)
- Robby Benavides (St. Mary's)

Legend

- (C) Team captain
- (S) Suspended
- (I) Ineligible
- (W) Walk-on
- Injured
- Current redshirt

Roster
Last update: September 10, 2024

== Schedule and results ==
Date time, TV	Rank^{#}	Opponent^{#}	Result	Record	High points	High rebounds	High assists	Site (attendance) city, state
Exhibition
October 15, 2024*; 9:00 p.m., BTN+		at USC; Trojan Tipoff Event	L 63–84		14 – Spears	6 – M. Njie	4 – Millender	Galen Center; Los Angeles, CA
Non-conference regular season
November 4, 2024*; 8:00 p.m., ESPN+		Trinity	W 103–77	1–0	27 – Spears	10 – Smith	7 – Millender	Convocation Center (975); San Antonio, TX
November 12, 2024*; 7:00 p.m., ESPN+		at Bradley	L 72–85	1–1	20 – Spears	6 – Horton	3 – Millender	Peoria Civic Center (4,557); Peoria, IL
November 16, 2024*; 3:00 p.m., ESPN+		Little Rock	L 64–81	1–2	15 – Spears	8 – Tied	5 – Spears	Convocation Center (858); San Antonio, TX
November 25, 2024*; 7:00 p.m., ESPN+		at Troy; Trojan Turkey Tipoff	L 72–86	1–3	20 – Spears	10 – Horton	4 – Tied	Trojan Arena (2,234); Troy, AL
November 27, 2024*; 12:00 p.m., ESPN+		vs. Merrimack; Trojan Turkey Tipoff	W 76–74	2–3	29 – Spears	20 – Smith	3 – Tied	Trojan Arena (121); Troy, AL
November 30, 2024*; 3:00 p.m., ESPN+		Houston Christian	W 78–71	3–3	31 – Spears	9 – Tied	5 – Spears	Convocation Center (828); San Antonio, TX
December 3, 2024*; 9:00 p.m., ESPN+		at Saint Mary's	L 74–82 ^{OT}	3–4	24 – Spears	14 – Scott	3 – Tied	University Credit Union Pavilion (3,015); Moraga, CA
December 7, 2024*; 1:00 p.m., SECN+/ESPN+		at Arkansas	L 60–75	3–5	19 – Spears	5 – Horton	2 – Tied	Bud Walton Arena (19,200); Fayetteville, AR
December 13, 2024*; 7:00 p.m., ESPN+		North Dakota; Rescheduled from Nov. 9	W 80–76	4–5	28 – Spears	11 – Smith	4 – Tied	Convocation Center (783); San Antonio, TX
December 15, 2024*; 2:00 p.m., SLN		at North Dakota	W 95–85	5–5	28 – Joseph	10 – Horton	7 – Millender	Betty Engelstad Sioux Center (1,613); Grand Forks, ND
December 19, 2024*; 12:00 p.m., ESPN+		Southwestern Adventist	W 117–58	6–5	22 – Monsanto	17 – Smith	5 – Spears	Convocation Center (751); San Antonio, TX
December 29, 2024*; 2:00 p.m., ESPN+		at Army	L 75–78	6–6	22 – Spears	9 – Spears	3 – Tied	Christl Arena (1,102); West Point, NY
AAC regular season
January 4, 2025; 5:00 p.m., ESPNU		at Tulane	L 63–92	6–7 (0–1)	17 – Horton	9 – Horton	4 – Spears	Devlin Fieldhouse (1,281); New Orleans, LA
January 7, 2025; 7:00 p.m., ESPN+		Tulsa	L 77–82	6–8 (0–2)	40 – Spears	12 – Smith	5 – Spears	Convocation Center (1,047); San Antonio, TX
January 11, 2025; 3:00 p.m., ESPN+		Wichita State	W 88–75	7–8 (1–2)	21 – Millender	10 – Horton	6 – Spears	Convocation Center (1,549); San Antonio, TX
January 14, 2025; 7:00 p.m., ESPN+		at Rice	W 90–84	8–8 (2–2)	26 – Spears	8 – Horton	5 – Tied	Tudor Fieldhouse (2,424); Houston, TX
January 18, 2025; 3:00 p.m., ESPN+		North Texas	L 57–72	8–9 (2–3)	19 – Joseph	4 – Joseph	3 – Horton	Convocation Center (1,399); San Antonio, TX
January 21, 2025; 6:30 p.m., ESPN+		at UAB	L 78–81	8–10 (2–4)	27 – Spears	8 – Smith	8 – Spears	Bartow Arena (3,592); Birmingham, AL
January 25, 2025; 3:00 p.m., ESPN+		Temple	W 88–79	9–10 (3–4)	20 – Tied	10 – Smith	6 – Millender	Convocation Center (1,263); San Antonio, TX
January 29, 2025; 6:00 p.m., ESPN+		at Florida Atlantic	L 74–94	9–11 (3–5)	21 – Monsanto	8 – Smith	5 – Spears	Eleanor R. Baldwin Arena (3,161); Boca Raton, FL
February 1, 2025; 6:00 p.m., ESPN+		at North Texas	W 54–50	10–11 (4–5)	23 – Horton	8 – Monsanto	3 – Millender	The Super Pit (5,032); Denton, TX
February 5, 2025; 7:00 p.m., ESPN+		Tulane	L 60–61	10–12 (4–6)	28 – Millender	10 – Smith	3 – Millender	Convocation Center (1,593); San Antonio, TX
February 8, 2025; 7:08 p.m., ESPNU		East Carolina	L 79–80	10–13 (4–7)	21 – Millender	6 – Tied	4 – Tied	Convocation Center (1,113); San Antonio, TX
February 12, 2025; 6:30 p.m., ESPN+		at Wichita State	L 64–69	10–14 (4–8)	16 – Horton	10 – Horton	3 – Spears	Charles Koch Arena (5,606); Wichita, KS
February 15, 2025; 5:00 p.m., ESPNU		at Tulsa	L 76–80	10–15 (4–9)	20 – Horton	6 – Tied	3 – Tied	Reynolds Center (2,827); Tulsa, OK
February 19, 2025; 7:00 p.m., ESPN+		South Florida	L 73–78	10–16 (4–10)	22 – Monsanto	7 – Smith	4 – Tied	Convocation Center (1,234); San Antonio, TX
February 23, 2025; 1:00 p.m., ESPN+		at East Carolina	L 89–96 ^{OT}	10–17 (4–11)	24 – Spears	8 – Smith	7 – Spears	Williams Arena (3,898); Greenville, NC
March 2, 2025; 5:00 p.m., ESPN+		Rice	W 84–56	11–17 (5–11)	25 – Tied	9 – Smith	7 – Millender	Convocation Center (1,124); San Antonio, TX
March 4, 2025; 6:00 p.m., ESPN+		No. 16 Memphis	L 70–75	11–18 (5–12)	18 – Smith	7 – Smith	7 – Spears	Convocation Center (1,429); San Antonio, TX
March 9, 2025; 3:00 p.m., ESPN+		at Charlotte	W 83–80	12–18 (6–12)	20 – Millender	8 – Millender	6 – Spears	Dale F. Halton Arena (2,528); Charlotte, NC
AAC tournament
March 13, 2025; 8:00 p.m., ESPNU	(11)	vs. (6) East Carolina; Second round	L 65–70	12–19	24 – Millender	14 – Smith	4 – Spears	Dickies Arena (4,133); Fort Worth, TX
*Non-conference game. ^{#}Rankings from AP poll. (#) Tournament seedings in parentheses. All times are in Central.

== See also ==
- 2024–25 UTSA Roadrunners women's basketball team
