= 2024–25 Tulsa Golden Hurricane men's basketball team =

American college basketball season

2024–25 Tulsa Golden Hurricane men's basketball
- Conference: American Athletic Conference
- Record: 13–20 (6–12 AAC)
- Head coach: Eric Konkol (3rd season)
- Assistant coaches: Duffy Conroy; Desmond Haymon; Yaphett King
- Home arena: Reynolds Center

2024–25 American Athletic Conference men's basketball standings
	Conf.				Overall
Team	W		L	PCT	W		L	PCT
No. 25 Memphis †	16	–	2	.889	29	–	6	.829
North Texas	14	–	4	.778	27	–	9	.750
UAB	13	–	5	.722	24	–	13	.649
Tulane	12	–	6	.667	19	–	15	.559
Florida Atlantic	10	–	8	.556	18	–	16	.529
East Carolina	10	–	8	.556	19	–	14	.576
Temple	9	–	9	.500	17	–	15	.531
Wichita State	8	–	10	.444	19	–	15	.559
South Florida	6	–	12	.333	13	–	19	.406
Tulsa	6	–	12	.333	13	–	20	.394
UTSA	6	–	12	.333	12	–	19	.387
Rice	4	–	14	.222	13	–	19	.406
Charlotte	3	–	15	.167	11	–	22	.333
† 2025 AAC tournament winner Rankings from AP Poll

The 2024–25 Tulsa Golden Hurricane men's basketball team represented the University of Tulsa during the 2024–25 NCAA Division I men's basketball season. The Golden Hurricane, led by third-year head coach Eric Konkol, played their home games at the Reynolds Center in Tulsa, Oklahoma as members of the American Athletic Conference (AAC).

== Previous season ==
The Golden Hurricane finished the 2023–24 season 16–15, 7–11 in AAC play to finish in a tie for eighth place. As a No. 9 seed in the AAC tournament they lost in the second round of the conference tournament to East Carolina.

== Offseason ==
=== Departures ===
Name	Number	Pos.	Height	Weight	Year	Hometown	Reason for departure
PJ Haggerty	4	G	6'3"	195	(redshirt) Freshman	Crosby, TX	Transferred to Memphis
Jarred Hall	5	F	6'8"		Freshman	Lebanon, TN	Transferred to Middle Tennessee
Carlous Williams	12	F	6'5"	230	Junior	Hattiesburg, MS	Transferred to Tennessee State
Cobe Williams	24	G	6'0"	180	Senior	Dallas, TX	Graduated
Mohamed Keita	34	C	7'1"	220	Sophomore	Conakry, Guinea	Transferred to Temple

=== Incoming transfers ===
Name	Num	Pos.	Height	Weight	Year	Hometown	Previous school
Dwon Odom	2	G	6'2"	182	GS senior	Alpharetta, GA	Georgia State
Braeden Carrington	4	G	6'4"	195	Junior	Brooklyn Park, MN	Minnesota
Justin Amadi	6	F	6'7"	225	(redshirt) Junior	Greenville, SC	James Madison
Tyler Behrend	9	F	6'9"		Sophomore	Cincinnati, OH	Olympic College

=== Recruiting classes ===
==== 2024 recruiting class ====
College recruiting
Name	Hometown	School	Height	Weight	Commit date
Jaye Nash #56 PG	Powder Springs, GA	McEachern High School	6 ft 0 in (1.83 m)	170 lb (77 kg)	May 12, 2024
Jaye Nash #56 PG	Recruit ratings: Scout: Rivals: 247Sports: ESPN: (79)				
Ian Smikle #61 C	Riviera Beach, FL	Suncoast High School	6 ft 8 in (2.03 m)	220 lb (100 kg)	Oct 6, 2023
Ian Smikle #61 C	Recruit ratings: Rivals: 247Sports: ESPN: (78)				
Overall recruit ranking:
Note: In many cases, Scout, Rivals, 247Sports, On3, and ESPN may conflict in their listings of height and weight.; In these cases, the average was taken. ESPN grades are on a 100-point scale.; Sources: "Tulsa 2024 Basketball Commitments". Rivals.; "2024 Team Ranking". Rivals.; "2024 Tulsa Golden Hurricane Basketball 24/7 Sports Commits". 247Sports.

==== 2025 recruiting class ====
College recruiting (2025)
Name	Hometown	School	Height	Weight	Commit date
Jaylen Lawal; CG	Lewisville, TX	iSchool Entrepreneurial Academy	6 ft 2 in (1.88 m)	195 lb (88 kg)	Sep 19, 2024
Jaylen Lawal; CG	Recruit ratings: Rivals: 247Sports: ESPN: (NR)				
Kentrell Martin Jr. SG	Gaineville, FL	The Rock School	6 ft 7 in (2.01 m)	200 lb (91 kg)	Sep 15, 2024
Kentrell Martin Jr. SG	Recruit ratings: Rivals: 247Sports: ESPN: (NR)				
Overall recruit ranking:
Note: In many cases, Scout, Rivals, 247Sports, On3, and ESPN may conflict in their listings of height and weight.; In these cases, the average was taken. ESPN grades are on a 100-point scale.; Sources: "Tulsa 2025 Basketball Commitments". Rivals.; "2025 Team Ranking". Rivals.; "2025 Tulsa Golden Hurricane Basketball 24/7 Sports Commits". 247Sports.

== Roster ==
2024–25 Tulsa Golden Hurricane men's basketball team
Players
Coaches

Pos.	#	Name	Height	Weight	Year	Previous school	Hometown
G	0	Keaston Willis	6 ft 3 in (1.91 m)	190 lb (86 kg)	GS	Sulphur Springs HS; Louisiana Tech	Sulphur Springs, TX
F	1	Matt Reed	6 ft 9 in (2.06 m)	240 lb (109 kg)	So	ISchool Academy	Carrollton, TX
G	2	Dwon Odom	6 ft 2 in (1.88 m)	182 lb (83 kg)	GS	St. Francis HS; Georgia State	Alpharetta, GA
G	3	Jaye Nash	6 ft 2 in (1.88 m)	175 lb (79 kg)	Fr	McEachern HS	Memphis, TN
G	4	Braeden Carrington	6 ft 4 in (1.93 m)	195 lb (88 kg)	Jr	Park Center HS; Minnesota	Brooklyn Park, MN
G	5	Jesaiah McWright	6 ft 4 in (1.93 m)	176 lb (80 kg)	Jr	Cypress Falls HS	Houston, TX
F	6	Justin Amadi	6 ft 7 in (2.01 m)	225 lb (102 kg)	RS Jr	Paul M. Dorman HS; James Madison	Greenville, SC
G	7	Cal Conroy (W)	—	—	Fr	Bishop Kelley HS	Tulsa, OK
G	8	Tyshawn Archie	6 ft 1 in (1.85 m)	175 lb (79 kg)	So	SPIRE Academy	Houston, TX
C	9	Tyler Behrend	6 ft 10 in (2.08 m)	—	So	Valley Lutheran HS; Olympic College	Cincinnati, OH
G	11	Isaiah Barnes	6 ft 7 in (2.01 m)	200 lb (91 kg)	Jr	Simeon Career Academy; Michigan	Chicago, IL
F	15	Jared Garcia	6 ft 8 in (2.03 m)	240 lb (109 kg)	Sr	St. Thomas More School; Salt Lake CC	Houston, TX
G	22	Ben Radford (W)	6 ft 4 in (1.93 m)	220 lb (100 kg)	So	Memorial HS	Tulsa, OK
G	23	Ari Seals (W)	6 ft 3 in (1.91 m)	177 lb (80 kg)	GS	Frisco HS	Frisco, TX
F	35	Ian Smikle	6 ft 9 in (2.06 m)	250 lb (113 kg)	Fr	Suncoast Community HS	West Palm Beach, FL

Head coach

- Eric Konkol (UW–Eau Claire)

Assistant coach(es)

- Duffy Conroy (St. Ambrose)
- Desmond Haymon (Stephen F. Austin)
- Yaphett King (Cal State Fullerton)

Legend

- (C) Team captain
- (S) Suspended
- (I) Ineligible
- (W) Walk-on
- Injured
- Current redshirt

Roster

== Schedule and results ==
Date time, TV	Rank^{#}	Opponent^{#}	Result	Record	High points	High rebounds	High assists	Site (attendance) city, state
Exhibition
October 30, 2024*; 7:00 p.m.		Missouri S&T	W 75–70	–	18 – Odom	10 – Willis	3 – Archie	Reynolds Center (2,715); Tulsa, OK
Non-conference regular season
November 4, 2024*; 7:00 p.m., ESPN+		Northeastern State	W 82–68	1–0	17 – Willis	7 – Tied	3 – Tied	Reynolds Center (2,874); Tulsa, OK
November 9, 2024*; 2:00 p.m., ESPN+		Arkansas–Pine Bluff	W 103–80	2–0	22 – Barnes	8 – Carrington	6 – Odom	Reynolds Center (2,753); Tulsa, OK
November 13, 2024*; 7:00 p.m., ESPN+		Oral Roberts; PSO Mayor's Cup	W 85–76	3–0	22 – Willis	8 – Willis	4 – Carrington	Reynolds Center (3,906); Tulsa, OK
November 16, 2024*; 1:00 p.m., ESPN+		at Missouri State	L 106–111 ^{3OT}	3–1	24 – Amadi	10 – Carrington	5 – Carrington	Great Southern Bank Arena (2,364); Springfield MO
November 20, 2024*; 7:00 p.m., ESPN+		Little Rock	L 57–71	3–2	15 – Archie	6 – Carrington	5 – Archie	Reynolds Center (2,841); Tulsa, OK
November 23, 2024*; 5:30 p.m., Marquee		at Loyola Chicago	L 53–89	3–3	10 – Odom	11 – Smikle	2 – Nash	Joseph J. Gentile Arena (3,055); Chicago, IL
November 26, 2024*; 11:00 a.m.		vs. Detroit Mercy; Jacksonville Classic	W 63–44	4–3	15 – Willis	8 – Odom	6 – Odom	FSCJ South Gym (123); Jacksonville FL
November 27, 2024*; 1:30 p.m.		vs. Georgia State; Jacksonville Classic	L 71–74	4–4	18 – Willis	11 – Odom	7 – Odom	FSCJ South Gym (203); Jacksonville, Florida
December 4, 2024*; 7:00 p.m., ESPN+		Oklahoma State	L 55–76	4–5	12 – Odom	6 – Tied	2 – Smikle	Reynolds Center (4,590); Tulsa, OK
December 7, 2024*; 2:00 p.m., ESPN+		Southern	L 66–70	4–6	23 – Willis	8 – Smikle	4 – Tied	Reynolds Center (2,716); Tulsa, OK
December 14, 2024*; 1:00 p.m., ESPN+		vs. UCF; Orange Bowl Basketball Classic	L 75–88	4–7	22 – Willis	6 – Carrington	7 – Odom	Amerant Bank Arena (7,866); Sunrise, FL
December 21, 2024*; 2:00 p.m., ESPN+		Mississippi Valley State	W 93–48	5–7	15 – Reed	9 – Reed	5 – Odom	Reynolds Center (2,777); Tulsa, OK
December 28, 2024*; 4:00 p.m., ESPN+		Southwestern Christian	W 96–63	6–7	18 – Archie	10 – Carrington	10 – Nash	Reynolds Center (2,705); Tulsa, OK
AAC regular season
January 1, 2025; 2:00 p.m., ESPN+		Rice	L 64–70	6–8 (0–1)	18 – Odom	8 – Smikle	3 – Tied	Reynolds Center (2,970); Tulsa, OK
January 4, 2025; 1:00 p.m., ESPNU		at UAB	L 51–83	6–9 (0–2)	17 – Smikle	8 – Smikle	3 – Odom	Bartow Arena (3,451); Birmingham, AL
January 7, 2025; 7:00 p.m., ESPN+		at UTSA	W 82–77	7–9 (1–2)	20 – Carrington	10 – Smikle	10 – Odom	Convocation Center; San Antonio, TX
January 12, 2025; 2:30 p.m., ESPNU		Charlotte	W 69–63	8–9 (2–2)	22 – Odom	10 – Smikle	5 – Odom	Reynolds Center (3,046); Tulsa, OK
January 18, 2025; 2:00 p.m., ESPN+		at South Florida	L 56–63	8–10 (2–3)	14 – Amadi	7 – Amadi	10 – Odom	Yuengling Center (8,636); Tampa, FL
January 21, 2025; 7:00 p.m., ESPN+		East Carolina	L 76–85 ^{OT}	8–11 (2–4)	19 – Odom	11 – Odom	7 – Odom	Reynolds Center (2,770); Tulsa, OK
January 26, 2025; 2:00 p.m., ESPN+		Wichita State; Rivalry	W 84–77	9–11 (3–4)	22 – Garcia	9 – Odom	10 – Odom	Reynolds Center (3,427); Tulsa, OK
January 29, 2025; 7:00 p.m., ESPN+		UAB	L 68–78	9–12 (3–5)	17 – Odom	10 – Barnes	7 – Odom	Reynolds Center (2,687); Tulsa, OK
February 2, 2025; 1:00 p.m., ESPNU		at Tulane	L 56–59	9–13 (3–6)	13 – Odom	6 – Odom	3 – Tied	Devlin Fieldhouse (1,232); New Orleans, LA
February 5, 2025; 7:00 p.m., ESPN+		at No. 17 Memphis	L 71–83	9–14 (3–7)	17 – Archie	7 – Smikle	6 – Odom	FedExForum (10,237); Memphis, TN
February 8, 2025; 11:00 a.m., ESPNU		Florida Atlantic	L 55–79	9–15 (3–8)	11 – Archie	7 – Smikle	3 – Odom	Reynolds Center (3,048); Tulsa, OK
February 12, 2025; 6:00 p.m., ESPN+		at Temple	W 80–74	10–15 (4–8)	19 – Willis	7 – Willis	10 – Odom	Liacouras Center (2,663); Philadelphia, PA
February 15, 2025; 5:00 p.m., ESPNU		UTSA	W 80–76	11–15 (5–8)	19 – Willis	8 – Barnes	7 – Odom	Reynolds Center (2,827); Tulsa, OK
February 19, 2025; 7:00 p.m., ESPN+		at North Texas	L 44–63	11–16 (5–9)	14 – Garcia	10 – Barnes	5 – Odom	The Super Pit (4,032); Denton, TX
February 22, 2025; 2:00 p.m., ESPN+		at Rice	L 50–71	11–17 (5–10)	14 – Willis	11 – Garcia	3 – Barnes	Tudor Fieldhouse; Houston, TX
March 1, 2025; 1:00 p.m., ESPNU		Tulane	L 77–79	11–18 (5–11)	20 – Barnes	7 – Smikle	8 – Odom	Reynolds Center (3,084); Tulsa, OK
March 4, 2025; 7:00 p.m., ESPN+		Temple	L 77–81	11–19 (5–12)	22 – Willis	6 – Smikle	7 – Odom	Reynolds Center (3,049); Tulsa, OK
March 9, 2025; 1:00 p.m., ESPN+		at Wichita State; Rivalry	W 73–63	12–19 (6–12)	20 – Odom	6 – Tied	4 – Odom	Charles Koch Arena (6,279); Wichita, KS
AAC tournament
March 13, 2025; 6:00 p.m., ESPNU	(10)	vs. (7) Temple; Second round	W 75–71	13–19	20 – Garcia	7 – Smikle	8 – Odom	Dickies Arena; Fort Worth, TX
March 14, 2025; 6:00 p.m., ESPNU	(10)	vs. (2) North Texas; Quarterfinals	L 59–77	13–20	20 – Willis	8 – Carrington	5 – Odom	Dickies Arena; Fort Worth, TX
*Non-conference game. ^{#}Rankings from AP poll. (#) Tournament seedings in parentheses. All times are in Central.
