= 2024–25 Wichita State Shockers men's basketball team =

American college basketball season

2024–25 Wichita State Shockers men's basketball

NIT, First round
- Conference: American Athletic Conference
- Record: 19–15 (8–10 AAC)
- Head coach: Paul Mills (2nd season)
- Associate head coach: Kenton Paulino
- Assistant coaches: T.J. Cleveland; Quincy Acy; Iain Laymon; Xavier Holland
- Home arena: Charles Koch Arena

2024–25 American Athletic Conference men's basketball standings
	Conf.				Overall
Team	W		L	PCT	W		L	PCT
No. 25 Memphis †	16	–	2	.889	29	–	6	.829
North Texas	14	–	4	.778	27	–	9	.750
UAB	13	–	5	.722	24	–	13	.649
Tulane	12	–	6	.667	19	–	15	.559
Florida Atlantic	10	–	8	.556	18	–	16	.529
East Carolina	10	–	8	.556	19	–	14	.576
Temple	9	–	9	.500	17	–	15	.531
Wichita State	8	–	10	.444	19	–	15	.559
South Florida	6	–	12	.333	13	–	19	.406
Tulsa	6	–	12	.333	13	–	20	.394
UTSA	6	–	12	.333	12	–	19	.387
Rice	4	–	14	.222	13	–	19	.406
Charlotte	3	–	15	.167	11	–	22	.333
† 2025 AAC tournament winner Rankings from AP Poll

The 2024–25 Wichita State Shockers men's basketball team represented Wichita State University in the 2024–25 NCAA Division I men's basketball season. The Shockers, led by second-year head coach Paul Mills, played their home games at Charles Koch Arena in Wichita, Kansas as members of the American Athletic Conference (AAC).

== Previous season ==
The Shockers finished the season 15–19 and 5–13 in AAC play. They finished in a five-way tie for 10th place in the AAC. With tie-breakers they got the 12th seed in the AAC tournament. In the first round, the Shockers played 13th seed Rice 88–81. In the second round, the Shockers played fifth-seeded Memphis and upset them, 71–65. The Shockers reached the quarterfinals and played against UAB, but lost 72–60, ending their season.

== Offseason ==
=== Departures ===
Departures
Name	Number	Pos.	Height	Weight	Year	Hometown	Reason
Colby Rogers	4	G	6' 4"	190	RS-Junior	Covington, GA	Transferred to Memphis
Isaac Abidde	5	F	6' 8"	208	RS-Sophomore	Albany, GA	Transferred to Cleveland State
Dalen Ridgnal	10	F	6' 6"	209	Graduate student	Kansas City, MO	Graduated
Kenny Pohto	11	F	6' 10"	243	Junior	Stockholm, Sweden	Transferred to UC Santa Barbara
Trevor McBride	14	G	6' 0"	150	RS-Freshman	Basehor, KS	Entered transfer portal
Jacob Germany	24	F	6' 10"	226	Senior	Kingston, OK	Graduated

=== Incoming transfers ===
Incoming transfers
Name	Number	Pos.	Height	Weight	Year	Hometown	Previous school
A.J. McGinnis	0	G	6' 3"	178	Fifth-year senior	Huntsville, AL	Lipscomb
Zane Meeks	5	F	6' 9"	231	Graduate student	Prairie Village, KS	Arizona State
Corey Washington	6	F	6' 5"	188	Junior	Sherwood, AR	Saint Peter's
Justin Hill	11	G	5' 11"	191	Fifth-year senior	Houston, TX	Georgia
Matej Bosnjak	17	C	6' 9"	240	Senior	Zagreb, Croatia	Signed from KK Cibona

==== 2024 recruiting class ====
College recruiting information
Name	Hometown	School	Height	Weight	Commit date
Zion Pipkin; G	Houston, TX	Legacy School of Sport Sciences	6 ft 0 in (1.83 m)	180 lb (82 kg)	Oct 6, 2024
Zion Pipkin; G	Recruit ratings: 247Sports: ESPN: (79)				
T.J. Williams; G	Wichita, KS	Wichita Heights High School	6 ft 5 in (1.96 m)	202 lb (92 kg)	
T.J. Williams; G	Recruit ratings: 247Sports: ESPN: (78)				
Overall recruit ranking:
Note: In many cases, Scout, Rivals, 247Sports, On3, and ESPN may conflict in their listings of height and weight.; In these cases, the average was taken. ESPN grades are on a 100-point scale.; Sources: "2024 Team Ranking". Rivals.

== Roster ==
2024–25 Wichita State Shockers men's basketball team
Players
Coaches

Pos.	#	Name	Height	Weight	Year	Previous school	Hometown
G	0	A.J. McGinnis	6 ft 3 in (1.91 m)	178 lb (81 kg)	GS	Link Academy; UNC Greensboro; Cincinnati; Lipscomb	Huntsville, AL
G	1	Xavier Bell	6 ft 2 in (1.88 m)	185 lb (84 kg)	Sr	Andover Central High School; Drexel	Wichita, KS
G	2	Zion Pipkin	6 ft 0 in (1.83 m)	180 lb (82 kg)	Fr	Legacy School of Sport Sciences	Houston, TX
F	3	Ronnie III DeGray	6 ft 6 in (1.98 m)	225 lb (102 kg)	Sr	Woodstock Academy; UMass; Missouri	Parker, CO
G	4	T.J. Williams	6 ft 5 in (1.96 m)	202 lb (92 kg)	Fr	Wichita Heights High School	Wichita, KS
F	5	Zane Meeks	6 ft 9 in (2.06 m)	231 lb (105 kg)	GS	Shawnee Mission East High School; Nevada; San Francisco; Arizona State	Prairie Village, KS
F	6	Corey Washington	6 ft 5 in (1.96 m)	188 lb (85 kg)	Jr	Sylvan Hills High School; Saint Peter's	Sherwood, AR
G	8	Yanis Bamba	6 ft 5 in (1.96 m)	211 lb (96 kg)	RS Fr	Collège Jean-de-Brébeuf	Laval, QC
G	11	Justin Hill	5 ft 11 in (1.8 m)	191 lb (87 kg)	Sr	Travis High School; Longwood; Georgia	Houston, TX
G	12	Joy Ighovodja	6 ft 4 in (1.93 m)	205 lb (93 kg)	So	NBA Academy Africa	Abeokuta, Nigeria
C	15	Quincy Ballard	6 ft 11 in (2.11 m)	251 lb (114 kg)	Sr	Quality Education Academy; Florida State	Syracuse, NY
C	17	Matej Bosnjak	6 ft 9 in (2.06 m)	240 lb (109 kg)	Sr	KK Cibona	Zagreb, Croatia
G	20	Harlond Beverly	6 ft 5 in (1.96 m)	195 lb (88 kg)	RS Jr	Montverde Academy; Miami (FL)	Detroit, MI
F	21	Henry Thengvall (W)	6 ft 6 in (1.98 m)	199 lb (90 kg)	RS So	Kapaun Mt. Carmel Catholic High School	Wichita, KS
G	55	Bijan Cortes	6 ft 2 in (1.88 m)	188 lb (85 kg)	Sr	Kingfisher High School; Oklahoma	Kingfisher, OK

Head coach

- Paul Mills (Texas A&M)

Assistant coach(es)

- Kenton Paulino (Texas)
- T.J. Cleveland (Arkansas)
- Quincy Acy (Baylor)
- Iain Laymon (Indiana)
- Xavier Holland (Truett McConnell)

Legend

- (C) Team captain
- (S) Suspended
- (I) Ineligible
- (W) Walk-on
- Injured
- Current redshirt

Roster
Last update: December 27, 2024

== Schedule and results ==
Date time, TV	Rank^{#}	Opponent^{#}	Result	Record	High points	High rebounds	High assists	Site (attendance) city, state
Exhibition
October 27, 2024*; 6:30 p.m.		Emporia State	W 99–53	–	15 – Washington	8 – tied	3 – Cortes	Charles Koch Arena (5,940); Wichita, KS
Non-conference regular season
November 4, 2024*; 7:00 p.m., CBSSN		at Western Kentucky	W 91–84	1–0	31 – Hill	8 – Hill	6 – Hill	E. A. Diddle Arena (4,547); Bowling Green, KY
November 9, 2024*; 6:00 p.m., ESPN+		Montana State	W 89–69	2–0	17 – Hill	6 – tied	5 – Hill	Charles Koch Arena (6,179); Wichita, KS
November 14, 2024*; 6:30 p.m., ESPN+		Northern Iowa	W 79–73	3–0	19 – Washington	7 – DeGray III	4 – Hill	Charles Koch Arena (5,927); Wichita, KS
November 18, 2024*; 6:30 p.m., ESPN+		Monmouth	W 70–66	4–0	20 – Washington	8 – Washington	5 – Hill	Charles Koch Arena (5,582); Wichita, KS
November 22, 2024*; 9:30 p.m., Peacock		vs. Saint Louis; Hall of Fame Classic	W 88–63	5–0	17 – Hill	8 – Washington	4 – Hill	T-Mobile Center (4,892); Kansas City, MO
November 28, 2024*; 11:00 a.m., ESPN2		vs. Minnesota; ESPN Events Invitational Semifinal	W 68–66 ^{OT}	6–0	16 – Beverly	7 – tied	3 – Cortes	State Farm Field House (3,191); Bay Lake, FL
November 29, 2024*; 2:30 p.m., ESPN		vs. No. 18 Florida; ESPN Events Invitational Final	L 51–88	6–1	11 – Bosnjak	4 – tied	2 – tied	State Farm Field House (3,875); Bay Lake, FL
December 4, 2024*; 6:30 p.m., ESPN+		Alcorn State	W 78–54	7–1	14 – tied	14 – Ballard	8 – Beverly	Charles Koch Arena (5,642); Wichita, KS
December 7, 2024*; 6:00 p.m., ESPN+		East Tennessee State	W 96–87	8–1	20 – Hill	13 – Washington	8 – Cortes	Charles Koch Arena (5,602); Wichita, KS
December 14, 2024*; 12:00 p.m., FS1		at DePaul	L 72–91	8–2	14 – tied	8 – Washington	7 – Cortes	Wintrust Arena (3,861); Chicago, IL
December 17, 2024*; 6:30 p.m., ESPN+		Kansas City	L 64–74	8–3	21 – Bell	11 – Ballard	3 – Beverly	Charles Koch Arena (5,722); Wichita, KS
December 21, 2024*; 6:00 p.m., ESPN+		Kansas State	W 84–65	9–3	24 – Bell	10 – tied	5 – Cortes	Charles Koch Arena (8,253); Wichita, KS
December 29, 2024*; 5:00 p.m., ESPN+		Friends	W 87–72	10–3	29 – Bell	16 – Ballard	4 – Cortes	Charles Koch Arena (5,981); Wichita, KS
AAC regular season
January 3, 2025; 6:00 p.m., ESPN2		at Temple	L 85–91	10–4 (0–1)	25 – Hill	13 – Ballard	5 – Hill	Liacouras Center (3,622); Philadelphia, PA
January 6, 2025; 7:00 p.m., ESPN2		South Florida	L 72–91	10–5 (0–2)	19 – Bell	11 – Washington	2 – tied	Charles Koch Arena (5,469); Wichita, KS
January 11, 2025; 3:00 p.m., ESPN+		at UTSA	L 75–88	10–6 (0–3)	23 – Bell	7 – Washington	4 – tied	Convocation Center (1,549); San Antonio, TX
January 14, 2025; 6:30 p.m., ESPN+		Charlotte	W 68–59	11–6 (1–3)	16 – Washington	11 – Ballard	4 – tied	Charles Koch Arena (5,359); Wichita, KS
January 18, 2025; 6:00 p.m., ESPN+		East Carolina	L 72–75	11–7 (1–4)	19 – Washington	18 – Washington	6 – Hill	Charles Koch Arena (5,826); Wichita, KS
January 23, 2025; 6:00 p.m., ESPN2		at No. 24 Memphis	L 53–61	11–8 (1–5)	18 – Beverly	10 – Ballard	3 – Tied	FedExForum (10,725); Memphis, TN
January 26, 2025; 2:00 p.m., ESPN+		at Tulsa; Rivalry	L 77–84	11–9 (1–6)	19 – Bell	7 – Washington	6 – Beverly	Reynolds Center (3,427); Tulsa, OK
January 29, 2025; 6:30 p.m., ESPN+		North Texas	L 54–58	11–10 (1–7)	19 – Bell	13 – Ballard	4 – Hill	Charles Koch Arena (5,845); Wichita, KS
February 4, 2025; 6:00 p.m., ESPNU		at Charlotte	W 66–58	12–10 (2–7)	21 – Washington	13 – Ballard	4 – Cortes	Dale F. Halton Arena (2,638); Charlotte, NC
February 9, 2025; 7:00 p.m., ESPN+		at South Florida	W 75–70	13–10 (3–7)	26 – Bell	12 – Ballard	2 – Tied	Yuengling Center (3,730); Tampa, FL
February 12, 2025; 6:30 p.m., ESPN+		UTSA	W 69–64	14–10 (4–7)	17 – Washington	12 – Washington	3 – Tied	Charles Koch Arena (5,606); Wichita, KS
February 16, 2025; 11:00 a.m., ESPN		No. 14 Memphis	W 84–79 ^{OT}	15–10 (5–7)	19 – Ballard	15 – Washington	6 – Beverly	Charles Koch Arena (6,294); Wichita, KS
February 20, 2025; 8:00 p.m., ESPN2		at Florida Atlantic	W 75–68	16–10 (6–7)	24 – Bell	12 – Ballard	7 – Cortes	Eleanor R. Baldwin Arena (3,161); Boca Raton, FL
February 23, 2025; 1:00 p.m., ESPN+		Tulane	W 78–67	17–10 (7–7)	23 – Bell	9 – Tied	9 – Cortes	Charles Koch Arena (6,350); Wichita, KS
February 27, 2025; 8:00 p.m., ESPNU		UAB	L 72–80	17–11 (7–8)	24 – Washington	14 – Ballard	6 – Cortes	Charles Koch Arena (6,588); Wichita, KS
March 3, 2025; 8:00 p.m., ESPN2		at North Texas	L 66–68	17–12 (7–9)	19 – Bell	4 – Tied	1 – Tied	The Super Pit (3,924); Denton, TX
March 6, 2025; 7:00 p.m., ESPN+		at Rice	W 63–59	18–12 (8–9)	16 – Beverly	16 – DeGray III	2 – Tied	Tudor Fieldhouse (1,647); Houston, TX
March 9, 2025; 1:00 p.m., ESPN+		Tulsa; Rivalry	L 63–73	18–13 (8–10)	14 – Washington	13 – Ballard	4 – Hill	Charles Koch Arena (6,279); Wichita, KS
AAC tournament
March 13, 2025; 11:30 a.m., ESPNU	(8)	vs. (9) South Florida; Second round	W 73–68	19–13	21 – Washington	12 – Ballard	7 – Cortes	Dickies Arena; Fort Worth, TX
March 14, 2025; 12:00 p.m., ESPN2	(8)	vs. (1) No. 16 Memphis; Quarterfinals	L 80–83	19–14	19 – Cortes	9 – DeGray III	5 – Tied	Dickies Arena; Fort Worth, TX
NIT
March 18, 2025*; 8:00 p.m., ESPN2		at (4) Oklahoma State; First round – Dallas Region	L 79–89	19–15	24 – Bell	15 – Ballard	9 – Cortes	Gallagher-Iba Arena (2,295); Stillwater, OK
*Non-conference game. ^{#}Rankings from AP poll. (#) Tournament seedings in parentheses. All times are in Central.
