= Austin Claunch =

American basketball coach (born 1989)

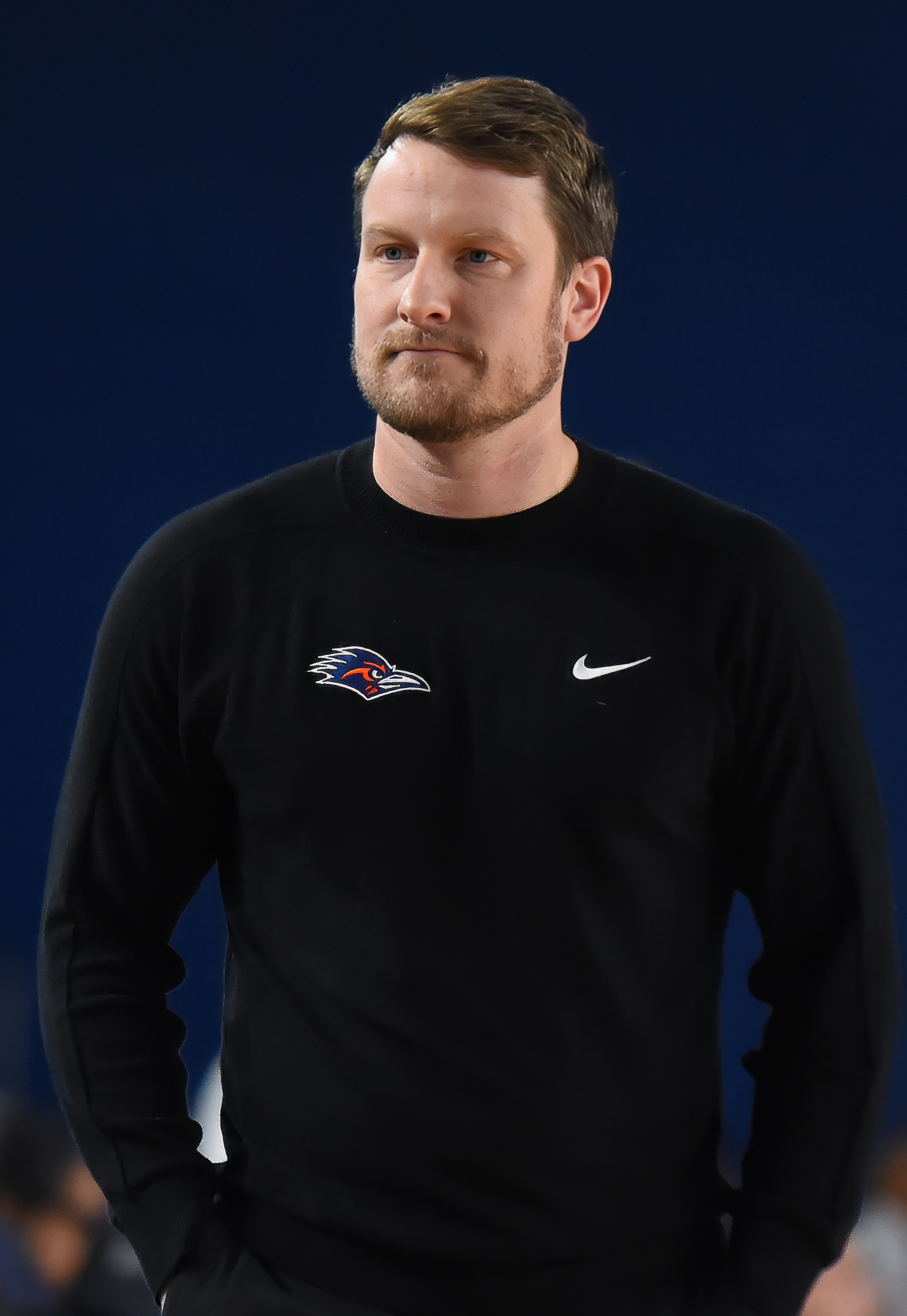
- Claunch coaching UTSA in 2025

Biographical details
- Born: November 17, 1989 (age 36); Buenos Aires, Argentina

Playing career
- 2008–2012: Emory

Coaching career (HC unless noted)
- 2013–2015: Clemson (graduate assistant)
- 2016–2018: Nicholls (assistant)
- 2018–2023: Nicholls
- 2023–2024: Alabama (assistant)
- 2024–2026: UTSA

Administrative career (AD unless noted)
- 2012–2013: George Mason (director of player development)

Head coaching record
- Overall: 107–105 (.505)
- Tournaments: 0–1 (NIT)

Accomplishments and honors

Championships
- 2 Southland regular season (2021, 2022)

Awards
- Southland Coach of the Year (2021)

Austin Claunch (born November 17, 1989) is an American college basketball coach. He most recently served as the head coach at the University of Texas at San Antonio (UTSA) from 2024 to 2026. Previously, he served as the head at Nicholls State University from 2018 to 2023.

== Playing career ==
Claunch played four years at Emory, where he was a three-time First Team All-University Athletic Association selection, finishing his career with the Eagles as the school's all-time assists leader, and ranking eighth all-time in career points.

== Coaching career ==
After graduation, Claunch spent the 2012–13 season as the director of player development under Paul Hewitt at George Mason, and from 2013 to 2015 served as a graduate manager at Clemson before being named the assistant video services director for the Tigers for the 2015–16 season.

Claunch earned his first collegiate assistant coaching position at Nicholls State, joining Richie Riley's staff. After two seasons as an assistant, he was elevated to the head coaching position at Nicholls when Riley accepted the head coaching position at South Alabama.

Claunch was named the head coach of UTSA on March 17, 2024.

On October 28, 2026, one week prior to the start of the basketball season, Claunch was suspended by UTSA after being arrested on suspicion of driving while intoxicated.

On November 13, 2026, just over two weeks after his arrest, it was announced that Claunch and UTSA had mutually agreed to part ways, ending his tenure.

== Head coaching record ==
=== NCAA DI ===
Record table
Season	Team	Overall	Conference	Standing	Postseason
Nicholls Colonels (Southland Conference) (2018–2023)
2018–19	Nicholls	14–17	7–11	T–9th	
2019–20	Nicholls	21–10	15–5	T–2nd	
2020–21	Nicholls	18–7	14–2	1st	
2021–22	Nicholls	21–12	11–3	1st	NIT First Round
2022–23	Nicholls	16–15	11–7	4th	
Nicholls:		90–61 (.596)	58–28 (.674)		
UTSA Roadrunners (American Athletic Conference) (2024–2026)
2024–25	UTSA	12–19	6–12	T–9th	
2025–26	UTSA	5–25	1–17	13th	
UTSA:		17–44 (.279)	7–29 (.194)		
Total:		107–105 (.505)			
National champion Postseason invitational champion Conference regular season champion Conference regular season and conference tournament champion Division regular season champion Division regular season and conference tournament champion Conference tournament champion
