= 2024–25 Rice Owls men's basketball team =

American college basketball season

2024–25 Rice Owls men's basketball
- Conference: American Athletic Conference
- Record: 13–19 (4–14 AAC)
- Head coach: Rob Lanier (1st season)
- Associate head coach: Chris Kreider
- Assistant coaches: Josten Crow; Andre Owens; Nelson Terroba; Jordan Glover
- Home arena: Tudor Fieldhouse

2024–25 American Athletic Conference men's basketball standings
	Conf.				Overall
Team	W		L	PCT	W		L	PCT
No. 25 Memphis †	16	–	2	.889	29	–	6	.829
North Texas	14	–	4	.778	27	–	9	.750
UAB	13	–	5	.722	24	–	13	.649
Tulane	12	–	6	.667	19	–	15	.559
Florida Atlantic	10	–	8	.556	18	–	16	.529
East Carolina	10	–	8	.556	19	–	14	.576
Temple	9	–	9	.500	17	–	15	.531
Wichita State	8	–	10	.444	19	–	15	.559
South Florida	6	–	12	.333	13	–	19	.406
Tulsa	6	–	12	.333	13	–	20	.394
UTSA	6	–	12	.333	12	–	19	.387
Rice	4	–	14	.222	13	–	19	.406
Charlotte	3	–	15	.167	11	–	22	.333
† 2025 AAC tournament winner Rankings from AP Poll

The 2024–25 Rice Owls men's basketball team represented Rice University during the 2024–25 NCAA Division I men's basketball season. The team, led by first-year head coach Rob Lanier, played their home games at Tudor Fieldhouse in Houston, Texas as second-year members of the American Athletic Conference.

== Previous season ==
The Owls finished the 2023–24 season 11–21, 5–12 in AAC play to finish in a five-way tie for 10th place. As the No. 12 seed in the AAC tournament, they lost in the first round to Wichita State.

On March 14, 2024, the school fired head coach Scot Pera. On March 24, the school hired Rob Lanier, who had been fired as head coach of SMU, as the team's new head coach.

The January 6 home game against UTSA was played in the Jerabeck Activity and Athletic Center on the campus of the University of St. Thomas due to water damage to Tudor Fieldhouse.

== Offseason ==
=== Departures ===
Name	Number	Pos.	Height	Weight	Year	Hometown	Reason for departure
Sam Alajiki	0	F	6'7"	230	Junior	Dundalk, Ireland	Transferred to Oral Roberts
Noah Shelby	1	G	6'3"	185	Sophomore	McKinney, TX	Transferred to Kansas
Mekhi Mason	2	G	6'5"	195	Sophomore	Gilbert, AZ	Transferred to Washington
Travis Evee	3	G	6'1"	180	Senior	Randolph, MA	Graduated
Anthony Selden	4	G	6'6"	225	Senior	Boston, MA	Graduate transferred to Garnder–Webb
Cameron Sheffield	5	G/F	6'6"	195	Junior	Alpharetta, GA	Transferred to Duke
Camp Wagner	12	G	6'6"	175	Freshman	Dallas, TX	Transferred to Indiana State
Max Fiedler	15	F	6'11"	230	Senior	Indialantic, FL	Graduated
Gabe Warren	21	G	6'6"	205	Freshman	Plano, TX	Transferred to Holy Cross
Keanu Dawes	24	F	6'9"	205	Freshman	Houston, TX	Transferred to Utah

=== Incoming transfers ===
Name	Number	Pos.	Height	Weight	Year	Hometown	Previous School
Kellen Amos	1	G/F	6'7"	190	GS Senior	Houston, TX	Central Connecticut
Emory Lanier	2	G	6'4"	190	GS Senior	Atlanta, GA	Walk-on; SMU
Trey Patterson	3	F	6'9"	225	(redshirt) Senior	Somerset, NJ	Villanova
Denver Anglin	4	G	6'2"	185	Junior	Montclair, NJ	SMU
Jacob Dar	5	G/F	6'7"	170	Junior	Omaha, NE	Emory and Henry
Jalen Smith	6	G	6'2"	195	Senior	Orlando, FL	SMU
Trae Broadnax	12	G	6'4"	200	(redshirt) Senior	Savannah, GA	USC Upstate
Jimmy Oladokun Jr.	24	F	6'9"	220	Sophomore	Los Angeles, CA	San Diego
Caden Powell	44	F	6'10"	220	Junior	Waco, TX	Wyoming

=== Recruiting classes ===
==== 2024 recruiting class ====
College recruiting information
Name	Hometown	School	Height	Weight	Commit date
Aaron Powell #38 PG	Los Angeles, CA	Campbell Hall High School	5 ft 11 in (1.80 m)	N/A	Apr 29, 2024
Aaron Powell #38 PG	Recruit ratings: Rivals: 247Sports: ESPN: (79)				
Overall recruit ranking:
Note: In many cases, Scout, Rivals, 247Sports, On3, and ESPN may conflict in their listings of height and weight.; In these cases, the average was taken. ESPN grades are on a 100-point scale.; Sources: "2024 Team Ranking". Rivals.

==== 2025 recruiting class ====
College recruiting information (2025)
Name	Hometown	School	Height	Weight	Commit date
Cam Carroll #29 PG	Grand Prairie, TX	South Grand Prairie High School	6 ft 2 in (1.88 m)	170 lb (77 kg)	Sep 4, 2024
Cam Carroll #29 PG	Recruit ratings: Rivals: 247Sports: ESPN: (79)				
Boden Howell; SG	Meridian, ID	Owyhee High School	6 ft 4 in (1.93 m)	180 lb (82 kg)	Sep 10, 2024
Boden Howell; SG	Recruit ratings: Rivals: 247Sports: ESPN: (NR)				
Evan Cochran; PF	Houston, TX	The Village School	6 ft 8 in (2.03 m)	210 lb (95 kg)	Sep 10, 2024
Evan Cochran; PF	Recruit ratings: Rivals: 247Sports: ESPN: (NR)				
Overall recruit ranking:
Note: In many cases, Scout, Rivals, 247Sports, On3, and ESPN may conflict in their listings of height and weight.; In these cases, the average was taken. ESPN grades are on a 100-point scale.; Sources: "2025 Team Ranking". Rivals.

== Roster ==
2024–25 Rice Owls men's basketball team
Players
Coaches

Pos.	#	Name	Height	Weight	Year	Previous school	Hometown
C	0	Ifeanyi Ufchukwu	6 ft 11 in (2.11 m)	240 lb (109 kg)	Jr	Covenant Day School (NC)	Benin City, Nigeria
G/F	1	Kellen Amos	6 ft 7 in (2.01 m)	190 lb (86 kg)	GS	Saint John XXIII College Prep; Central Connecticut	Houston, TX
G	2	Emory Lanier (W)	6 ft 4 in (1.93 m)	190 lb (86 kg)	GS	Woodward Academy; SMU	Atlanta, GA
F	3	Trey Patterson	6 ft 9 in (2.06 m)	225 lb (102 kg)	RS Sr	Rutgers Prep; Rutgers	Somerset, NJ
G	4	Denver Anglin	6 ft 1 in (1.85 m)	185 lb (84 kg)	Jr	Gill St. Bernard's School; SMU	Montclair, NJ
G/F	5	Jacob Dar	6 ft 7 in (2.01 m)	170 lb (77 kg)	Jr	Freedom Christian Academy (NC); Emory and Henry	Omaha, NE
G	6	Jalen Smith (redshirt)	6 ft 4 in (1.93 m)	195 lb (88 kg)	Sr	Oak Ridge HS; SMU	Orlando, FL
G	10	Cole Andrews-Heitz (W)	6 ft 1 in (1.85 m)	170 lb (77 kg)	So	Rouse HS	Leander, TX
G	11	Aaron Powell	6 ft 1 in (1.85 m)	175 lb (79 kg)	Fr	Campbell Hall HS	Los Angeles, CA
G	12	Trae Broadnax	6 ft 4 in (1.93 m)	200 lb (91 kg)	RS Sr	Montverde Academy; USC	Savannah, GA
F	13	Andrew Akuchie	6 ft 11 in (2.11 m)	215 lb (98 kg)	Jr	St. Thomas Aquinas HS	Fort Lauderdale, FL
G	22	Jackson Peakes (W)	6 ft 4 in (1.93 m)	185 lb (84 kg)	RS Jr	St. John's HS	Houston, TX
G	23	Alem Huseinovic	6 ft 4 in (1.93 m)	185 lb (84 kg)	GS	PHHoenix Prep; Nevada	Zenica, Bosnia and Herzegovina
F	24	Jimmy Oladokun Jr.	6 ft 9 in (2.06 m)	220 lb (100 kg)	So	Sierra Canyon; San Diego	Los Angeles, CA
F	30	George Perkins (W)	6 ft 8 in (2.03 m)	200 lb (91 kg)	RS So	Sidwell Friends School	Washington, D.C.
F	44	Caden Powell	6 ft 10 in (2.08 m)	220 lb (100 kg)	Jr	Midway HS; Wyoming	Waco, TX

Head coach

- Rob Lanier (St. Bonaventure)

Assistant coach(es)

- Chris Kreider (Lebanon Valley)
- Josten Crow (Sam Houston State)
- Andre Owens (Texas–San Antonio)
- Nelson Terroba (Lamar)

Legend

- (C) Team captain
- (S) Suspended
- (I) Ineligible
- (W) Walk-on
- Injured
- Current redshirt

Roster

== Schedule and results ==
Date time, TV	Rank^{#}	Opponent^{#}	Result	Record	High points	High rebounds	High assists	Site (attendance) city, state
Non-conference regular season
November 5, 2024*; 6:00 p.m., ESPN+		FIU	W 77–70	1–0	17 – C. Powell	11 – C. Powell	6 – Broadnax	Tudor Fieldhouse (1,111); Houston, TX
November 9, 2024*; 6:00 p.m., ESPN+		vs. Florida State; The Battleground 2k24	L 65–73	1–1	14 – Huseinovic	7 – Oladokun Jr.	3 – Broadnax	Toyota Center; Houston, TX
November 12, 2024*; 7:00 p.m., ESPN+		Louisiana–Monroe	W 66–50	2–1	15 – Huseinovic	9 – Patterson	7 – Broadnax	Tudor Fieldhouse (1,096); Houston, TX
November 16, 2024*; 2:00 p.m., ESPN+		Northwestern State	W 77–75 ^{OT}	3–1	16 – Amos	8 – Amos	7 – Amos	Tudor Fieldhouse (1,644); Houston, TX
November 19, 2024*; 7:30 p.m., ESPN+		at Louisiana	W 83–61	4–1	20 – Anglin	9 – Tied	6 – Broadnax	Cajundome (1,328); Lafayette, LA
November 22, 2024*; 7:00 p.m., ESPN+		at Houston Christian	W 61–58	5–1	19 – Broadnax	13 – C. Powell	4 – Broadnax	Sharp Gymnasium (847); Houston, TX
November 29, 2024*; 6:00 p.m., FloSports		vs. Hofstra; Nassau Championship	L 63–68 ^{OT}	5–2	16 – Broadnax	7 – C. Powell	5 – Amos	Baha Mar Convention Center (321); Nassau, Bahamas
November 30, 2024*; 6:00 p.m., FloSports		vs. Arkansas State; Nassau Championship	W 75–67	6–2	18 – Broadnax	9 – C. Powell	6 – Broadnax	Baha Mar Convention Center (333); Nassau, Bahamas
December 1, 2024*; 1:00 p.m., FloSports		vs. Iona; Nassau Championship	W 70–66	7–2	16 – Broadnax	7 – Tied	2 – Tied	Baha Mar Convention Center (294); Nassau, Bahamas
December 8, 2024*; 2:00 p.m., ESPN+		at Texas State	L 66–75	7–3	14 – C. Powell	6 – Tied	5 – Amos	Strahan Arena (1,597); San Marcos, TX
December 16, 2024*; 7:00 p.m., ESPN+		Alcorn State	W 77–75	8–3	20 – Huseinovic	6 – Broadnax	7 – Broadnax	Tudor Fieldhouse (1,297); Houston, TX
December 19, 2024*; 11:15 a.m., ESPN+		UNT Dallas	L 68–69	8–4	13 – Broadnax	8 – C. Powell	3 – Tied	Tudor Fieldhouse (1,381); Houston, TX
December 22, 2024*; 7:00 p.m., ESPN+		Prairie View A&M	W 64–46	9–4	14 – Akuchie	10 – Broadnax	8 – Broadnax	Tudor Fieldhouse (1,735); Houston, TX
AAC regular season
January 1, 2025; 2:00 p.m., ESPN+		at Tulsa	W 70–64	10–4 (1–0)	12 – Anglin	8 – Tied	2 – Tied	Reynolds Center (2,970); Tulsa, OK
January 4, 2025; 2:00 p.m., ESPN+		Charlotte	W 68–55	11–4 (2–0)	12 – Amos	9 – Oladokun Jr.	4 – Broadnax	Tudor Fieldhouse (1,316); Houston, TX
January 8, 2025; 8:00 p.m., ESPNU		at North Texas	L 59–81	11–5 (2–1)	12 – Powell	8 – Akuchie	4 – Broadnax	The Super Pit (2,836); Denton, TX
January 11, 2025; 1:00 p.m., ESPNU		Temple	L 70–73	11–6 (2–2)	18 – Akuchie	11 – Akuchie	5 – Tied	Tudor Fieldhouse (1,300); Houston, TX
January 14, 2025; 7:00 p.m., ESPN+		UTSA	L 84–90	11–7 (2–3)	19 – Broadnax	6 – Tied	6 – Broadnax	Tudor Fieldhouse (2,424); Houston, TX
January 19, 2025; 12:00 p.m., ESPN+		at Florida Atlantic	L 73–75	11–8 (2–4)	19 – Dar	8 – Powell	4 – Broadnax	Eleanor R. Baldwin Arena (3,161); Boca Raton, FL
January 25, 2025; 1:00 p.m., ESPNU		Tulane	L 71–82	11–9 (2–5)	27 – Anglin	11 – Powell	3 – Tied	Tudor Fieldhouse (1,517); Houston, TX
January 28, 2025; 6:00 p.m., ESPNU		at South Florida	L 64–69	11–10 (2–6)	17 – Anglin	8 – Tied	5 – Broadnax	Yuengling Center (4,238); Tampa, FL
February 2, 2025; 2:00 p.m., ESPN+		No. 19 Memphis	L 83–86	11–11 (2–7)	19 – Broadnax	8 – Dar	6 – Broadnax	Tudor Fieldhouse (2,278); Houston, TX
February 5, 2025; 6:00 p.m., ESPN+		at East Carolina	W 73–60	12–11 (3–7)	18 – C. Powell	10 – C. Powell	8 – Broadnax	Williams Arena (3,827); Greenville, NC
February 8, 2025; 3:00 p.m., ESPN+		at Charlotte	L 75–78	12–12 (3–8)	21 – Broadnax	8 – C. Powell	4 – Broadnax	Dale F. Halton Arena (3,388); Charlotte, NC
February 11, 2025; 8:00 p.m., ESPNU		North Texas	L 61–67	12–13 (3–9)	16 – Dar	8 – Tied	5 – Broadnax	Tudor Fieldhouse (1,617); Houston, TX
February 15, 2025; 11:00 a.m., ESPN+		at Tulane	L 78–81	12–14 (3–10)	21 – Dar	9 – Amos	4 – C. Powell	Devlin Fieldhouse; New Orleans, LA
February 19, 2025; 7:00 p.m., ESPN+		UAB	L 89–90	12–15 (3–11)	24 – Dar	10 – Akuchie	3 – Tied	Tudor Fieldhouse (1,165); Houston, TX
February 22, 2025; 2:00 p.m., ESPN+		Tulsa	W 71–50	13–15 (4–11)	16 – Broadnax	9 – Akuchie	3 – Broadnax	Tudor Fieldhouse (2,641); Houston, TX
February 26, 2025; 7:00 p.m., ESPN+		at No. 18 Memphis	L 72–84	13–16 (4–12)	19 – Powell	7 – Powell	3 – Tied	FedExForum (11,012); Memphis, TN
March 2, 2025; 5:00 p.m., ESPN+		at UTSA	L 56–84	13–17 (4–13)	12 – C. Powell	9 – C. Powell	3 – Tied	Convocation Center (1,124); San Antonio, TX
March 6, 2025; 7:00 p.m., ESPN+		Wichita State	L 59–63	13–18 (4–14)	12 – Amos	12 – Powell	4 – Broadnax	Tudor Fieldhouse (1,647); Houston, TX
AAC Tournament
March 12, 2025; 12:00 p.m., ESPN+	(12)	vs. (13) Charlotte; First Round	L 61–65	13–19	15 – Amos	9 – Dar	4 – Amos	The Super Pit (497); Denton, TX
*Non-conference game. ^{#}Rankings from AP Poll. (#) Tournament seedings in parentheses. All times are in Central.

== See also ==
- 2024–25 Rice Owls women's basketball team
