= 2024–25 Florida Atlantic Owls men's basketball team =

American college basketball season

2024–25 Florida Atlantic Owls men's basketball

NIT, First round
- Conference: American Athletic Conference
- Record: 18–16 (10–8 AAC)
- Head coach: John Jakus (1st season)
- Assistant coaches: Aditya Malhotra; Todd Abernethy; Jordan Fee; Isaiah Austin
- Home arena: Eleanor R. Baldwin Arena

2024–25 American Athletic Conference men's basketball standings
	Conf.				Overall
Team	W		L	PCT	W		L	PCT
No. 25 Memphis †	16	–	2	.889	29	–	6	.829
North Texas	14	–	4	.778	27	–	9	.750
UAB	13	–	5	.722	24	–	13	.649
Tulane	12	–	6	.667	19	–	15	.559
Florida Atlantic	10	–	8	.556	18	–	16	.529
East Carolina	10	–	8	.556	19	–	14	.576
Temple	9	–	9	.500	17	–	15	.531
Wichita State	8	–	10	.444	19	–	15	.559
South Florida	6	–	12	.333	13	–	19	.406
Tulsa	6	–	12	.333	13	–	20	.394
UTSA	6	–	12	.333	12	–	19	.387
Rice	4	–	14	.222	13	–	19	.406
Charlotte	3	–	15	.167	11	–	22	.333
† 2025 AAC tournament winner Rankings from AP Poll

The 2024–25 Florida Atlantic Owls men's basketball team represented Florida Atlantic University in the 2024–25 NCAA Division I men's basketball season. The Owls, led by first-year head coach John Jakus, played their home games at Eleanor R. Baldwin Arena in Boca Raton, Florida as a member of the American Athletic Conference (AAC).

== Previous season ==
The Owls finished the 2023–24 season 25–9, 14–4 in AAC play to finish in second place. They beat North Texas in the quarterfinals of the AAC tournament before losing to Temple in the semifinals. They received an at-large bid to the NCAA tournament as the No. 8 seed in the East region. There they lost to Northwestern, ending their season.

On March 24, 2024, head coach Dusty May left the school to take the head coaching position at Michigan. On March 27, the school named Baylor assistant John Jakus the team's new head coach.

== Offseason ==
=== Departures ===
Name	Number	Pos.	Height	Weight	Year	Hometown	Reason for departure
Brenen Lorient	0	F	6'9"	200	Sophomore	Ocala, FL	Transferred to North Texas
Johnell Davis	1	G	6'4"	203	Junior	Gary, IN	Transferred to Arkansas
Nick Boyd	2	G	6'3"	175	(redshirt) Sophomore	Garnerville, NY	Transferred to San Diego State
Giacarlo Rosado	3	F	6'8"	247	Junior	West Palm Beach, FL	Transferred to Charlotte
Bryan Greenlee	4	G	6'0"	191	Senior	Gainesville, FL	Graduated
Isaiah Gaines	5	F	6'8"	225	Junior	Pensacola, FL	Transferred to Radford
Jalen Gaffney	12	G	6'3"	185	Senior	Columbus, NJ	Graduated
Alijah Martin	15	G	6'2"	210	Junior	Summit, MS	Transferred to Florida
Alejando Ralat	21	G	6'0"	160	(redshirt) Junior	San Juan, PR	Walk-on; transferred
Brandon Weatherspoon	23	G	6'4"	186	Senior	Canton, MS	Graduated
Leo Beath	30	F	6'8"	210	(redshirt) Freshman	Malibu, CA	Walk-on; transferred
Vladislav Goldin	50	C	7'1"	240	Junior	Nalchik, Russia	Transferred to Michigan

=== Incoming transfers ===
Name	Num	Pos.	Height	Weight	Year	Hometown	Previous school
Ken Evans Jr.	0	G	6'5"	200	(redshirt) Senior	Jackson, MS	Jackson State
Kaleb Glenn	1	F	6'6"	205	Sophomore	Louisville, KY	Louisville
Leland Walker	2	G	6'1"	185	Junior	Indianapolis, IN	Eastern Kentucky
Baba Miller	18	F	6'11"	204	Junior	Mallorca, Spain	Florida State
KyKy Tandy	24	G	6'2"	190	GS Senior	Hopkinsville, KY	Jacksonville State
Niccolo Moretti	25	G	6'1"	170	(redshirt) Sophomore	Bologna, Italy	Illinois

=== Recruiting classes ===
==== 2024 recruiting class ====
College recruiting information
Name	Hometown	School	Height	Weight	Commit date
Amar Amkou; SG	Thiès, Senegal	NBA Academy Africa	6 ft 7 in (2.01 m)	198 lb (90 kg)	May 4, 2024
Amar Amkou; SG	Recruit ratings: No ratings found				
Mantas Kočanas; C	Kaunas, Lithuania	Klaipėda Varpas gymnasium	6 ft 11 in (2.11 m)	N/A	Nov 14, 2023
Mantas Kočanas; C	Recruit ratings: No ratings found				
Overall recruit ranking:
Note: In many cases, Scout, Rivals, 247Sports, On3, and ESPN may conflict in their listings of height and weight.; In these cases, the average was taken. ESPN grades are on a 100-point scale.; Sources: "2024 Team Ranking". Rivals.

==== 2025 recruiting class ====
College recruiting information (2025)
Name	Hometown	School	Height	Weight	Commit date
Josiah Parker; PF	Leesburg, GA	Lee County High School	6 ft 6 in (1.98 m)	215 lb (98 kg)	Sep 12, 2024
Josiah Parker; PF	Recruit ratings: 247Sports:				
Overall recruit ranking:
Note: In many cases, Scout, Rivals, 247Sports, On3, and ESPN may conflict in their listings of height and weight.; In these cases, the average was taken. ESPN grades are on a 100-point scale.; Sources: "2025 Team Ranking". Rivals.

== Roster ==
2024–25 Florida Atlantic Owls men's basketball team
Players
Coaches

Pos.	#	Name	Height	Weight	Year	Previous school	Hometown
G	0	Ken Evans Jr.	6 ft 5 in (1.96 m)	205 lb (93 kg)	RS Sr	Forest Hill; Jackson State	Jackson, MS
F	1	Kaleb Glenn	6 ft 7 in (2.01 m)	210 lb (95 kg)	So	La Lumiere School; Louisville	Louisville, KY
G	2	Leland Walker	6 ft 1 in (1.85 m)	185 lb (84 kg)	Jr	Hargrave Military Academy; Eastern Kentucky	Indianapolis, IN
G	3	Amar Amkou	6 ft 7 in (2.01 m)	210 lb (95 kg)	Fr	CSI Keur Madior	Thiès, Senegal
G	4	Liam Dayco-Green (W)	6 ft 2 in (1.88 m)	185 lb (84 kg)	Fr	Prolific Prep	Vancouver, BC
C	8	Matas Vokietaitis	7 ft 0 in (2.13 m)	245 lb (111 kg)	Fr	Kauno Varpas Gymnasium	Marijampolė, Lithuania
G	9	Max Langenfeld (W)	6 ft 6 in (1.98 m)	195 lb (88 kg)	Fr	Urspringschule	Ulm, Germany
G	11	Jakel Powell	6 ft 5 in (1.96 m)	190 lb (86 kg)	So	Raleigh Christian	Raleigh, NC
F	12	Tre Carroll	6 ft 7 in (2.01 m)	233 lb (106 kg)	RS So	Charlotte	Punta Gorda, FL
G	13	Jack Johnson (W)	6 ft 4 in (1.93 m)	185 lb (84 kg)	RS So	Choate Rosemary	White Plains, NY
F	18	Baba Miller	6 ft 11 in (2.11 m)	215 lb (98 kg)	Jr	Real Madrid; Florida State	Mallorca, Spain
G	22	Devin Vanterpool	6 ft 4 in (1.93 m)	190 lb (86 kg)	RS Fr	Christ the King	Laurel, MD
G	24	KyKy Tandy	6 ft 2 in (1.88 m)	205 lb (93 kg)	GS	University Heights Academy; Jacksonville State	Hopkinsville, KY
G	25	Niccolo Moretti	6 ft 1 in (1.85 m)	175 lb (79 kg)	RS So	NBA Global Academy (Australia); Illinois	Bologna, Italy

Head coach

- John Jakus (Trinity International)

Assistant coach(es)

- Aditya Malhotra (Baylor)
- Todd Abernethy (Mississippi)
- Jordan Fee (West Liberty)
- Isaiah Austin (Baylor)

Legend

- (C) Team captain
- (S) Suspended
- (I) Ineligible
- (W) Walk-on
- Injured
- Current redshirt

Roster

== Schedule and results ==
Date time, TV	Rank^{#}	Opponent^{#}	Result	Record	High points	High rebounds	High assists	Site (attendance) city, state
Exhibition
October 26, 2024*; 2:00 p.m.		Saint Leo	W 104–53		23 – Vokietaitis	9 – Glenn	5 – Moretti	Eleanor R. Baldwin Arena; Boca Raton, FL
November 1, 2024*; 8:00 p.m.		at No. 11 Auburn; Charity Exhibition Game	L 70–102		16 – Glenn	8 – Glenn	2 – Tied	Neville Arena (9,121); Auburn, AL
Non-conference regular season
November 4, 2024*; 7:30 p.m., Gray TV		vs. Indiana State; Total Athlete Tip-Off	W 97–64	1–0	19 – Moretti	9 – Miller	5 – Evans Jr.	Wooden Family Fieldhouse (1,200); Xenia, OH
November 8, 2024*; 7:00 p.m., ESPN+		Coastal Georgia	W 99–49	2–0	18 – Tied	9 – Tied	8 – Moretti	Eleanor R. Baldwin Arena (3,161); Boca Raton, FL
November 12, 2024*; 7:00 p.m., ESPN+		at UCF	L 94–100	2–1	20 – Walker	5 – Tied	5 – Walker	Addition Financial Arena (8,302); Orlando, FL
November 15, 2024*; 7:00 p.m., YouTube		at Charleston; Field of 68 Tip-Off	L 116–119 ^{2OT}	2–2	27 – Glenn	12 – Miller	8 – Moretti	TD Arena (4,963); Charleston, SC
November 16, 2024*; 6:00 p.m., YouTube		vs. Liberty; Field of 68 Tip-Off	W 77–74 ^{OT}	3–2	17 – Vokietaitis	6 – Tied	3 – Tied	TD Arena (331); Charleston, SC
November 21, 2024*; 2:30 p.m., ESPNU		vs. Oklahoma State; Charleston Classic Quarterfinals	W 86–78	4–2	21 – Tandy	8 – Miller	4 – Evans Jr.	TD Arena (1,818); Charleston, SC
November 22, 2024*; 11:30 a.m., ESPN2		vs. Drake; Charleston Classic Semifinals	L 63–75	4–3	14 – Walker	7 – Vokietaitis	5 – Miller	TD Arena; Charleston, SC
November 24, 2024*; 6:00 p.m., ESPN2		vs. Seton Hall; Charleston Classic 3rd Place Game	L 61–63	4–4	16 – Walker	9 – Vokietaitis	3 – Walker	TD Arena; Charleston, SC
November 30, 2024*; 6:00 p.m., ESPN+		Florida Gulf Coast	L 78–80	4–5	25 – Miller	11 – Miller	7 – Moretti	Eleanor R. Baldwin Arena (3,161); Boca Raton, FL
December 4, 2024*; 6:30 p.m., CBSSN		at FIU	W 88–77	5–5	24 – Carroll	7 – Glenn	12 – Walker	Ocean Bank Convocation Center (1,304); Miami, FL
December 10, 2024*; 7:00 p.m., ESPN+		Jacksonville	W 85–63	6–5	17 – Tied	11 – Miller	4 – Tied	Eleanor R. Baldwin Arena (3,161); Boca Raton, FL
December 14, 2024*; 2:00 p.m., ESPN+		Texas State	W 89–80	7–5	18 – Carroll	9 – Vokietaitis	7 – Tandy	Eleanor R. Baldwin Arena (3,161); Boca Raton, FL
December 21, 2024*; 2:00 p.m., FS1		at No. 20 Michigan State	L 69–86	7–6	24 – Carroll	8 – Carroll	7 – Moretti	Breslin Center (14,797); East Lansing, MI
AAC regular season
January 2, 2025; 7:00 p.m., ESPN2		No. 21 Memphis	L 62–90	7–7 (0–1)	12 – Glenn	7 – Glenn	2 – Moretti	Eleanor R. Baldwin Arena (3,161); Boca Raton, FL
January 5, 2025; 1:00 p.m., ESPN2		at East Carolina	W 78–76	8–7 (1–1)	17 – Tied	7 – Miller	7 – Walker	Williams Arena (3,858); Greenville, NC
January 8, 2025; 7:00 p.m., ESPN+		at Charlotte	W 75–64	9–7 (2–1)	20 – Miller	9 – Carroll	3 – Tied	Dale F. Halton Arena (2,164); Charlotte, NC
January 12, 2025; 5:00 p.m., ESPN		UAB	L 76–81	9–8 (2–2)	20 – Carroll	8 – Glenn	4 – Tied	Eleanor R. Baldwin Arena (3,161); Boca Raton, FL
January 15, 2025; 7:30 p.m., ESPN+		at Tulane	L 65–80	9–9 (2–3)	13 – Glenn	8 – Carroll	5 – Miller	Devlin Fieldhouse (1,679); New Orleans, LA
January 19, 2025; 1:00 p.m., ESPN+		Rice	W 75–73	10–9 (3–3)	17 – Carroll	9 – Tied	5 – Tied	Eleanor R. Baldwin Arena (3,161); Boca Raton, FL
January 26, 2025; 2:00 p.m., ESPNU		at North Texas	L 64–77	10–10 (3–4)	20 – Glenn	7 – Tied	2 – Tied	The Super Pit (3,715); Denton, TX
January 29, 2025; 7:00 p.m., ESPN+		UTSA	W 94–74	11–10 (4–4)	26 – Tandy	7 – Tied	11 – Miller	Eleanor R. Baldwin Arena (3,161); Boca Raton, FL
February 2, 2025; 2:00 p.m., ESPN2		South Florida	W 94–72	12–10 (5–4)	18 – Tied	7 – Tied	7 – Walker	Eleanor R. Baldwin Arena (3,161); Boca Raton, FL
February 8, 2025; 12:00 p.m., ESPNU		at Tulsa	W 79–55	13–10 (6–4)	17 – Miller	10 – Miller	5 – Tied	Reynolds Center (3,048); Tulsa, OK
February 10, 2025; 9:00 p.m., ESPN2		Charlotte	W 87–75	14–10 (7–4)	18 – Glenn	7 – Carroll	7 – Walker	Eleanor R. Baldwin Arena (3,161); Boca Raton, FL
February 16, 2025; 12:00 p.m., ESPN2		at Temple	W 83–81	15–10 (8–4)	17 – Glenn	7 – Tied	4 – Moretti	Liacouras Center (4,581); Philadelphia, PA
February 20, 2025; 9:00 p.m., ESPN2		Wichita State	L 68–75	15–11 (8–5)	16 – Glenn	5 – Miller	3 – Tied	Eleanor R. Baldwin Arena (3,161); Boca Raton, FL
February 23, 2025; 2:00 p.m., ESPN2		at No. 22 Memphis	L 65–84	15–12 (8–6)	20 – Carroll	7 – Tied	4 – Walker	FedExForum (12,532); Memphis, TN
February 27, 2025; 7:00 p.m., ESPN2		North Texas	L 61–71	15–13 (8–7)	19 – Walker	5 – Tied	5 – Walker	Eleanor R. Baldwin Arena (3,161); Boca Raton, FL
March 2, 2025; 12:00 p.m., ESPN2		at South Florida	W 69–63	16–13 (9–7)	17 – Miller	10 – Glenn	3 – Walker	Yuengling Center (4,504); Tampa, FL
March 6, 2025; 7:00 p.m., ESPN2		at UAB	L 80–89	16–14 (9–8)	21 – Vokietaitis	8 – Vokietaitis	10 – Walker	Bartow Arena (4,268); Birmingham, AL
March 9, 2025; 1:00 p.m., ESPN+		East Carolina	W 81–53	17–14 (10–8)	19 – Tandy	12 – Miller	5 – Miller	Eleanor R. Baldwin Arena (3,161); Boca Raton, FL
AAC tournament
March 13, 2025; 2:30 p.m., ESPNU	(5)	vs. (13) Charlotte; Second round	W 64–59	18–14	17 – Vokietaitis	7 – Vokietaitis	5 – Walker	Dickies Arena (4,162); Fort Worth, TX
March 14, 2025; 3:00 p.m., ESPN2	(5)	vs. (4) Tulane; Quarterfinals	L 76–83	18–15	21 – Vokietaitis	12 – Vokietaitis	7 – Walker	Dickies Arena (4,239); Fort Worth, TX
NIT
March 19, 2025*; 7:00 p.m., ESPN2	(8)	(1) Dayton; First round – Dayton Region	L 79–86	18–16	18 – Glenn	7 – Miller	7 – Walker	Eleanor R. Baldwin Arena (1,846); Boca Raton, FL
*Non-conference game. ^{#}Rankings from AP poll. (#) Tournament seedings in parentheses. All times are in Eastern.
