= 2024–25 UAB Blazers men's basketball team =

American college basketball season

2024–25 UAB Blazers men's basketball

NIT, Quarterfinals
- Conference: American Athletic Conference
- Record: 24–13 (13–5 AAC)
- Head coach: Andy Kennedy (5th season)
- Associate head coach: Ryan Cross
- Assistant coaches: Rob Williams; Chris Shumate
- Home arena: Bartow Arena

2024–25 American Athletic Conference men's basketball standings
	Conf.				Overall
Team	W		L	PCT	W		L	PCT
No. 25 Memphis †	16	–	2	.889	29	–	6	.829
North Texas	14	–	4	.778	27	–	9	.750
UAB	13	–	5	.722	24	–	13	.649
Tulane	12	–	6	.667	19	–	15	.559
Florida Atlantic	10	–	8	.556	18	–	16	.529
East Carolina	10	–	8	.556	19	–	14	.576
Temple	9	–	9	.500	17	–	15	.531
Wichita State	8	–	10	.444	19	–	15	.559
South Florida	6	–	12	.333	13	–	19	.406
Tulsa	6	–	12	.333	13	–	20	.394
UTSA	6	–	12	.333	12	–	19	.387
Rice	4	–	14	.222	13	–	19	.406
Charlotte	3	–	15	.167	11	–	22	.333
† 2025 AAC tournament winner Rankings from AP Poll

The 2024–25 UAB Blazers men's basketball team represented the University of Alabama at Birmingham during the 2024–25 NCAA Division I men's basketball season. The team, led by fifth-year head coach Andy Kennedy, played their home games at the Bartow Arena in Birmingham, Alabama as second-year members of American Athletic Conference (AAC).

== Previous season ==
The Blazers finished the 2023–24 season 23–12, 12–6 in AAC play to finish in fourth place. They defeated Wichita State in the quarterfinals, South Florida in the semifinals and Temple to win the AAC tournament. They received an automatic bid to the NCAA tournament as a No. 12 seed in the East region, where they lost in the first round to San Diego State.

== Offseason ==
=== Departures ===
Name	Number	Pos.	Height	Weight	Year	Hometown	Reason for departure
Javian Davis	0	F	6'9"	265	(redshirt) Senior	Canton, MS	Graduated
Daniel Ortiz	2	G	6'0"	185	Junior	Shreveport, LA	Transferred to North Alabama
Eric Gaines	4	G	6'2"	165	Junior	Lithonia, GA	Declare for 2024 NBA draft; went undrafted
James White	5	G	6'5"	190	Junior	Conyers, GA	Transferred to New Orleans
KJ Satterfield	11	G	6'4"	180	Freshman	The Bronx, NY	Transferred to Hampton
Barry Dunning Jr.	22	G	6'6"	195	Sophomore	Mobile, AL	Transferred to South Alabama
Seth Sigmon	23	F	6'3"	205	Senior	Houston, TX	Walk-on; left the team due to personal reasons

=== Incoming transfers ===
Name	Number	Pos.	Height	Weight	Year	Hometown	Previous school
Greg Gordon	0	G/F	6'5"	210	Senior	Chicago, IL	Iona
Jaborri McGhee	2	G	6'1"		Junior	Pike County, MS	South Plains College
Tyren Moore	5	G	5'11"	185	GSsSenior	Louisville, KY	Georgia Southern
Joey Kahn	12	G	6'4"	190	(redshirt) Junior	Mobile, AL	Walk-on; Coastal Carolina
Chance Beard	15	F	6'5"	200	GS senior	Birmingham, AL	Walk-on; Spring Hill College
Bradley Ezewiro	22	F	6'9"	265	Senior	Torrance, CA	Saint Louis

=== Recruiting classes ===
==== 2024 recruiting class ====
College recruiting
Name	Hometown	School	Height	Weight	Commit date
Reginald Kennedy, Jr. PG	Fayetteville, GA	Middle Georgia Prep	6 ft 1 in (1.85 m)	N/A	Aug 2, 2024
Reginald Kennedy, Jr. PG	Recruit ratings: No ratings found				
Makhi Myles; SF	Starkville, MS	Starkville High School	6 ft 6 in (1.98 m)	195 lb (88 kg)	Aug 2, 2024
Makhi Myles; SF	Recruit ratings: Rivals: 247Sports:				
Overall recruit ranking:
Note: In many cases, Scout, Rivals, 247Sports, On3, and ESPN may conflict in their listings of height and weight.; In these cases, the average was taken. ESPN grades are on a 100-point scale.; Sources: "2024 Team Ranking". Rivals.

==== 2025 recruiting class ====
College recruiting (2025)
Name	Hometown	School	Height	Weight	Commit date
Salim London #27 SG	Birmingham, AL	Hoover High School	6 ft 2 in (1.88 m)	185 lb (84 kg)	Sep 27, 2024
Salim London #27 SG	Recruit ratings: 247Sports: ESPN: (82)				
Lance Carr; SF	Dallas, TX	Justin F Kimball High School	6 ft 7 in (2.01 m)	180 lb (82 kg)	Sep 10, 2024
Lance Carr; SF	Recruit ratings: 247Sports:				
Overall recruit ranking:
Note: In many cases, Scout, Rivals, 247Sports, On3, and ESPN may conflict in their listings of height and weight.; In these cases, the average was taken. ESPN grades are on a 100-point scale.; Sources: "2025 Team Ranking". Rivals.

== Roster ==
2024–25 UAB Blazers men's basketball team
Players
Coaches

Pos.	#	Name	Height	Weight	Year	Previous school	Hometown
G	0	Greg Gordon	6 ft 5 in (1.96 m)	210 lb (95 kg)	Sr	Iona	Chicago, IL
G	2	Ja'Borri McGhee	6 ft 1 in (1.85 m)	205 lb (93 kg)	Fr	Winfield High School (AL)	McComb, MS
F	3	Yaxel Lendeborg	6 ft 9 in (2.06 m)	240 lb (109 kg)	Sr	Arizona Western College	Pennsauken, NJ
F	4	Christian Coleman	6 ft 9 in (2.06 m)	205 lb (93 kg)	Sr	South Plains College	Winnsboro, LA
G	5	Tyren Moore	5 ft 11 in (1.8 m)	180 lb (82 kg)	GS	Georgia Southern	Louisville, KY
G	6	Tony Toney	6 ft 2 in (1.88 m)	190 lb (86 kg)	Sr	Mae Jemison High School	Huntsville, AL
G	7	Marquis Hargrove	6 ft 3 in (1.91 m)	180 lb (82 kg)	RS Jr	Arizona Western College	Sacramento, CA
G	8	Efrem "Butta" Johnson	6 ft 4 in (1.93 m)	180 lb (82 kg)	Jr	Grissom High School	Huntsville, AL
G/F	9	Makhi Myles	6 ft 6 in (1.98 m)	200 lb (91 kg)	Fr	Starkville High School	Starkville, MS
G	10	Alejandro Vasquez	6 ft 4 in (1.93 m)	205 lb (93 kg)	Sr	Salt Lake Community College	Queens, NY
G	12	Joey Kahn (W)	6 ft 4 in (1.93 m)	190 lb (86 kg)	RS Jr	Coastal Carolina	Mobile, AL
G	13	Reginald Kennedy Jr.	6 ft 1 in (1.85 m)	180 lb (82 kg)	Fr	Fayette County High School	Fayetteville, GA
F	21	Chance Beard (W)	6 ft 5 in (1.96 m)	200 lb (91 kg)	GS	Spring Hill College	Birmingham, AL
F	22	Bradley Ezewiro	6 ft 9 in (2.06 m)	265 lb (120 kg)	Jr	Saint Louis	Torrance, CA
F	25	Will Shaver	6 ft 10 in (2.08 m)	260 lb (118 kg)	RS So	North Carolina	Birmingham, AL
G	30	Ryan Donohoo (W)	6 ft 0 in (1.83 m)	180 lb (82 kg)	Sr	Briarwood Christian School	Birmingham, AL

Head coach

- Andy Kennedy (UAB)

Assistant coach(es)

- Ryan Cross (Buffalo)
- Rob Williams (UAB)
- Chris Shumate (Murray State)

Legend

- (C) Team captain
- (S) Suspended
- (I) Ineligible
- (W) Walk-on
- Injured
- Current redshirt

Roster

== Schedule and results ==
Date time, TV	Rank^{#}	Opponent^{#}	Result	Record	High points	High rebounds	High assists	Site (attendance) city, state
Exhibition
October 27, 2024*; 2:00 p.m.		at Western Kentucky	W 88–79		16 – Johnson	15 – Lendeborg	5 – Tied	E. A. Diddle Arena (1,724); Bowling Green, KY
Non-conference regular season
November 4, 2024*; 6:30 p.m., ESPN+		Vermont	L 62–67	0–1	22 – Lendeborg	15 – Lendeborg	2 – Johnson	Bartow Arena (3,876); Birmingham, AL
November 7, 2024*; 6:30 p.m., ESPN+		Southern Miss	W 98–84	1–1	21 – Tied	9 – Coleman	6 – Lendeborg	Bartow Arena (3,791); Birmingham, AL
November 10, 2024*; 2:00 p.m., ESPN+		Southeastern Louisiana	W 82–72	2–1	22 – Lendeborg	12 – Coleman	5 – Lendeborg	Bartow Arena (3,291); Birmingham, AL
November 15, 2024*; 6:00 p.m., ESPN+		at High Point	L 65–68	2–2	21 – Johnson	15 – Lendeborg	2 – Gordon	Qubein Center (5,028); High Point, NC
November 18, 2024*; 6:30 p.m., ESPN+		Auburn Montgomery	W 109–64	3–2	25 – McGhee	11 – Ezewiro	6 – McGhee	Bartow Arena (3,454); Birmingham, AL
November 22, 2024*; 11:30 a.m., ESPN+		vs. Longwood; Paradise Jam Quarterfinal	L 81–89	3–3	18 – Lendeborg	10 – Lendeborg	4 – Tied	Sports and Fitness Center (1,535); Saint Thomas, U S V I
November 23, 2024*; 2:00 p.m., ESPN+		vs. Illinois State; Paradise Jam Consolation Semifinal	L 83–84	3–4	19 – Vasquez	4 – Lendeborg	7 – Lendeborg	Sports and Fitness Center (1,886); Saint Thomas, U S V I
November 25, 2024*; 11:30 a.m., ESPN+		vs. Louisiana; Paradise Jam Seventh Place	W 98–86	4–4	25 – Vasquez	11 – Coleman	7 – McGhee	Sports and Fitness Center (1,986); Saint Thomas, U S V I
December 1, 2024*; 3:00 p.m., ESPN2		Middle Tennessee	L 69–76	4–5	16 – Tied	10 – Tied	2 – Johnson	Bartow Arena (3,257); Birmingham, AL
December 6, 2024*; 6:30 p.m., ESPN+		Prairie View A&M	W 95–66	5–5	15 – Toney	17 – Lendeborg	6 – Tied	Bartow Arena (3,153); Birmingham, AL
December 15, 2024*; 5:00 p.m., ESPN+		Arkansas State	L 89–98 ^{OT}	5–6	22 – Tied	12 – Lendeborg	4 – Tied	Bartow Arena (4,108); Birmingham, AL
December 18, 2024*; 6:30 p.m., ESPN+		Alabama A&M	W 96–67	6–6	25 – Coleman	11 – Coleman	5 – Moore	Bartow Arena (3,661); Birmingham, AL
December 22, 2024*; 2:00 p.m., ESPN+		Alcorn State	W 91–74	7–6	19 – Ezewiro	12 – Lendeborg	6 – Lendeborg	Bartow Arena (3,110); Birmingham, AL
AAC regular season
December 31, 2024; 3:00 p.m., ESPNU		at North Texas	L 75–78	7–7 (0–1)	15 – Vasquez	11 – Lendeborg	4 – Lendeborg	The Super Pit (2,979); Denton, TX
January 4, 2025; 1:00 p.m., ESPNU		Tulsa	W 83–51	8–7 (1–1)	27 – Vasquez	13 – Coleman	4 – Tied	Bartow Arena (3,451); Birmingham, AL
January 7, 2025; 6:30 p.m., ESPN+		Tulane	W 81–69	9–7 (2–1)	25 – Lendeborg	13 – Lendeborg	8 – Lendeborg	Bartow Arena (3,142); Birmingham, AL
January 12, 2025; 4:00 p.m., ESPN		at Florida Atlantic	W 81–76	10–7 (3–1)	22 – Lendeborg	10 – Lendeborg	7 – Lendeborg	Eleanor R. Baldwin Arena (3,161); Boca Raton, FL
January 15, 2025; 6:00 p.m., ESPN+		at South Florida	W 92–83	11–7 (4–1)	21 – Coleman	9 – Coleman	6 – Lendeborg	Yuengling Center (4,572); Tampa, FL
January 21, 2025; 6:30 p.m., ESPN+		UTSA	W 81–78	12–7 (5–1)	24 – Lendeborg	14 – Lendeborg	7 – Lendeborg	Bartow Arena (3,592); Birmingham, AL
January 26, 2025; 12:00 p.m., ESPN2		at No. 24 Memphis; Battle for the Bones	L 77–100	12–8 (5–2)	21 – Johnson	10 – Lendeborg	5 – Lendeborg	FedExForum (12,051); Memphis, TN
January 29, 2025; 7:00 p.m., ESPN+		at Tulsa	W 78–68	13–8 (6–2)	28 – Lendeborg	13 – Lendeborg	6 – Lendeborg	Reynolds Center (2,687); Tulsa, OK
February 1, 2025; 1:00 p.m., ESPN+		Charlotte	W 96–78	14–8 (7–2)	26 – Vasquez	14 – Lendeborg	5 – Lendeborg	Bartow Arena (4,284); Birmingham, AL
February 3, 2025; 8:00 p.m., ESPN2		North Texas	W 64–61	15–8 (8–2)	17 – Lendeborg	13 – Lendeborg	3 – Lendeborg	Bartow Arena (4,318); Birmingham, AL
February 11, 2025; 6:00 p.m., ESPNU		at East Carolina	L 75–82	15–9 (8–3)	22 – Lendeborg	10 – Tied	3 – Tied	Williams Arena (3,863); Greenville, NC
February 16, 2025; 3:00 p.m., ESPN2		South Florida	W 85–78	16–9 (9–3)	21 – Lendeborg	19 – Lendeborg	3 – Tied	Bartow Arena (5,313); Birmingham, AL
February 19, 2025; 7:00 p.m., ESPN+		at Rice	W 90–89	17–9 (10–3)	24 – Johnson	14 – Lendeborg	8 – Moore	Tudor Fieldhouse (1,165); Houston, TX
February 23, 2025; 1:00 p.m., ESPNU		Temple	W 80–64	18–9 (11–3)	15 – Ezewiro	11 – Lendeborg	8 – Lendeborg	Bartow Arena (4,112); Birmingham, AL
February 27, 2025; 8:00 p.m., ESPNU		at Wichita State	W 80–72	19–9 (12–3)	29 – Vasquez	8 – Lendeborg	6 – Lendeborg	Charles Koch Arena (6,588); Wichita, KS
March 2, 2025; 3:00 p.m., ESPN		No. 18 Memphis; Battle for the Bones	L 81–88	19–10 (12–4)	22 – McGhee	9 – Coleman	5 – McGhee	Bartow Arena (8,424); Birmingham, AL
March 6, 2025; 6:00 p.m., ESPN2		Florida Atlantic	W 89–80	20–10 (13–4)	27 – McGhee	10 – Lendeborg	5 – Lendeborg	Bartow Arena (4,268); Birmingham, AL
March 9, 2025; 1:00 p.m., ESPN+		at Tulane	L 68–85	20–11 (13–5)	25 – McGhee	7 – Coleman	4 – Moore	Devlin Fieldhouse (1,573); New Orleans, LA
AAC tournament
March 14, 2025; 8:00 p.m., ESPNU	(3)	vs. (6) East Carolina; Quarterfinals	W 94–77	21–11	30 – Lendeborg	20 – Lendeborg	8 – Lendeborg	Dickies Arena (4,285); Fort Worth, TX
March 15, 2025; 4:00 p.m., ESPN2	(3)	vs. (2) North Texas; Semifinals	W 66–56	22–11	23 – Lendeborg	13 – Lendeborg	4 – Tied	Dickies Arena (5,840); Fort Worth, TX
March 16, 2025; 2:00 p.m., ESPN	(3)	vs. (1) No. 16 Memphis; Championship	L 72–84	22–12	19 – Lendeborg	17 – Lendeborg	4 – Lendeborg	Dickies Arena (5,119); Fort Worth, TX
NIT
March 19, 2025*; 6:00 p.m., ESPN+		at (3) Saint Joseph's; First Round – Irvine Region	W 69–65	23–12	16 – Lendeborg	17 – Lendeborg	4 – Vazquez	Hagan Arena (1,004); Philadelphia, PA
March 23, 2025*; 8:00 p.m., ESPNU		at (2) Santa Clara; Second Round – Irvine Region	W 88–84	24–12	22 – Lendeborg	11 – Lendeborg	7 – Tied	Leavey Center (742); Santa Clara, CA
March 26, 2025*; 8:00 p.m., ESPN2		at (1) UC Irvine; Quarterfinals – Irvine Region	L 77–81 ^{OT}	24–13	21 – Coleman	17 – Lendeborg	4 – Lendeborg	Bren Events Center (1,378); Irvine, CA
*Non-conference game. ^{#}Rankings from AP poll. (#) Tournament seedings in parentheses. All times are in Central.
