= 2024–25 North Texas Mean Green men's basketball team =

American college basketball season

2024–25 North Texas Mean Green men's basketball
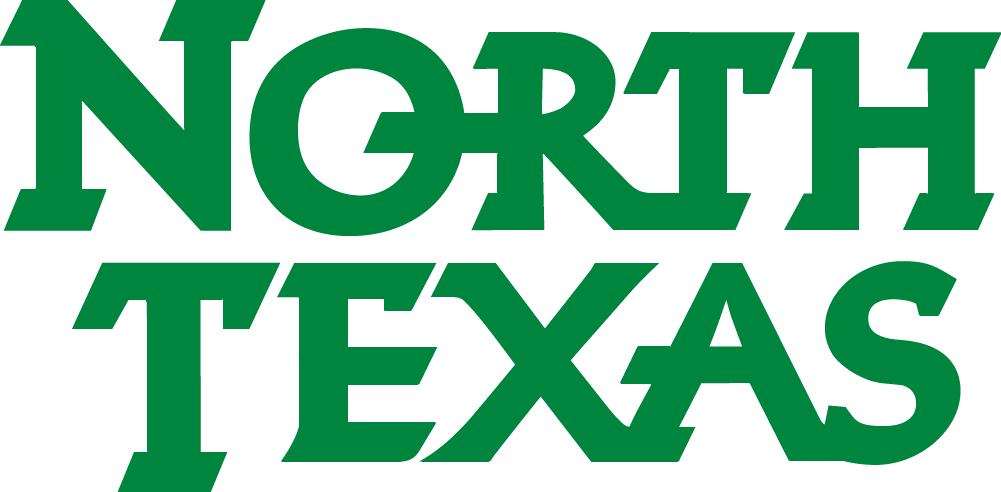

NIT, Semifinals
- Conference: American Athletic Conference
- Record: 27–9 (14–4 AAC)
- Head coach: Ross Hodge (2nd season)
- Assistant coaches: Johnny Estelle; Phil Forte; Jase Herl; Andre Shaw; Mike Randle
- Home arena: The Super Pit

2024–25 American Athletic Conference men's basketball standings
	Conf.				Overall
Team	W		L	PCT	W		L	PCT
No. 25 Memphis †	16	–	2	.889	29	–	6	.829
North Texas	14	–	4	.778	27	–	9	.750
UAB	13	–	5	.722	24	–	13	.649
Tulane	12	–	6	.667	19	–	15	.559
Florida Atlantic	10	–	8	.556	18	–	16	.529
East Carolina	10	–	8	.556	19	–	14	.576
Temple	9	–	9	.500	17	–	15	.531
Wichita State	8	–	10	.444	19	–	15	.559
South Florida	6	–	12	.333	13	–	19	.406
Tulsa	6	–	12	.333	13	–	20	.394
UTSA	6	–	12	.333	12	–	19	.387
Rice	4	–	14	.222	13	–	19	.406
Charlotte	3	–	15	.167	11	–	22	.333
† 2025 AAC tournament winner Rankings from AP Poll

The 2024–25 North Texas Mean Green men's basketball team represented the University of North Texas during the 2024–25 NCAA Division I men's basketball season. The team was led by second-year head coach Ross Hodge, and played their home games at UNT Coliseum in Denton, Texas as second-year members of the American Athletic Conference (AAC).

== Previous season ==
The Mean Green finished the 2023–24 season 19–15, 10–8 in AAC play, to finish in seventh place. They defeated Tulane in the first round of the AAC tournament before losing to Florida Atlantic in the quarterfinals. They received an at-large bid to the National Invitation Tournament. They defeated LSU in the first round before losing in the second round to Seton Hall.

== Offseason ==
=== Departures ===
Name	Number	Pos.	Height	Weight	Year	Hometown	Reason for departure
John Buggs III	0	G	6' 2"	185	(redshirt) Junior	Homer, LA	Transferred to East Tennessee State
Aaron Scott	1	G/F	6' 7"	200	Junior	Spring, TX	Transferred to St. John's
Jason Edwards	2	G	6' 1"	180	(redshirt) Sophomore	Atlanta, GA	Transferred to Vanderbilt
Christian Moore	3	G	5'11"	170	Sophomore	Jacksonville, AR	Transferred to Arkansas–Pine Bluff
Robert Allen	10	F	6' 8"	230	GS Senior	Orlando, FL	Graduated
Terrance Dixon Jr.	13	F	6' 8"	200	Sophomore	Lawrenceville, GA	Transferred to Lamar
Robin Jones	15	G	6' 5"	190	Senior	Houston, TX	Graduate transferred to Michigan
Chris Morgan	21	F	6' 8"	243	(redshirt) Sophomore	DeSoto, TX	Transferred to Monmouth
C. J. Noland	22	G	6' 3"	215	Junior	Waxahachie, TX	Transferred to New Mexico

=== Incoming transfers ===
Name	Number	Pos.	Height	Weight	Year	Hometown	Previous school
Latrell Jossell	1	G	6' 1"	185	Senior	Chicago, IL	Stephen F. Austin
Johnathan Massie	2	G	6' 6"	188	Senior	Houston, TX	Longwood
Jasper Floyd	3	G	6' 3"	195	Senior	Tampa, FL	Fairfield
Brenen Lorient	6	F	6' 9"	200	Junior	Ocala, FL	Florida Atlantic
Grant Newell	8	F	6' 8"	220	Junior	Chicago, IL	California
Atin Wright	10	G	6' 1"	185	Senior	Hawthorne, CA	Drake
Brock Vice	11	C	6' 10"	238	(redshirt) Freshman	Memphis, TN	Creighton

=== 2024 recruiting class ===
College recruiting information
Name	Hometown	School	Height	Weight	Commit date
Tyran Mason; SG	Plano, TX	Plano Sr. High School	6 ft 6 in (1.98 m)	185 lb (84 kg)	Sep 10, 2023
Tyran Mason; SG	Recruit ratings: Rivals: 247Sports: (NR)				
Baron Smith; C	Fort Worth, TX	Haltom High School	6 ft 9 in (2.06 m)	215 lb (98 kg)	Jul 6, 2024
Baron Smith; C	Recruit ratings: Rivals: 247Sports: (NR)				
Overall recruit ranking:
Note: In many cases, Scout, Rivals, 247Sports, On3, and ESPN may conflict in their listings of height and weight.; In these cases, the average was taken. ESPN grades are on a 100-point scale.; Sources: "2024 Team Ranking". Rivals.

=== 2025 recruiting class ===
College recruiting information (2025)
Name	Hometown	School	Height	Weight	Commit date
DeAndre Thomas; PF	Allen, TX	Allen High School	6 ft 7 in (2.01 m)	210 lb (95 kg)	Sep 8, 2024
DeAndre Thomas; PF	Recruit ratings: Rivals: 247Sports: (NR)				
Overall recruit ranking:
Note: In many cases, Scout, Rivals, 247Sports, On3, and ESPN may conflict in their listings of height and weight.; In these cases, the average was taken. ESPN grades are on a 100-point scale.; Sources: "2025 Team Ranking". Rivals.

== Roster ==
2024–25 North Texas Mean Green men's basketball team
Players
Coaches

Pos.	#	Name	Height	Weight	Year	Previous school	Hometown
G	0	Tyran Mason	6 ft 6 in (1.98 m)	195 lb (88 kg)	Fr	Plano Sr. HS	Vichy, France
G	1	Latrell Jossell	6 ft 1 in (1.85 m)	175 lb (79 kg)	Sr	Keller Central HS; Stephen F. Austin	Chicago, IL
G	2	Johnathan Massie	6 ft 6 in (1.98 m)	195 lb (88 kg)	Sr	Legacy the School of Sport Sciences; Longwood	Houston, TX
G	3	Jasper Floyd	6 ft 3 in (1.91 m)	195 lb (88 kg)	Sr	Wharton HS; Fairfield	Tampa, FL
G	4	Alex Cotton	6 ft 5 in (1.96 m)	200 lb (91 kg)	So	Hebron HS	Carrollton, TX
G	5	Rondel Walker	6 ft 5 in (1.96 m)	185 lb (84 kg)	Sr	Putnam City West HS; TCU	Midwest City, OK
F	6	Brenen Lorient	6 ft 9 in (2.06 m)	215 lb (98 kg)	Jr	Forest HS; Florida Atlantic	Ocala, FL
F	7	Baron Smith Jr.	6 ft 9 in (2.06 m)	220 lb (100 kg)	Fr	Haltom City HS	Haltom City, TX
F	8	Grant Newell	6 ft 9 in (2.06 m)	220 lb (100 kg)	Jr	IMG Academy (FL); California	Chicago, IL
G	10	Atin Wright	6 ft 1 in (1.85 m)	185 lb (84 kg)	Sr	Fairmount Prep; Drake	Hawthorne, CA
C	11	Brock Vice	6 ft 10 in (2.08 m)	240 lb (109 kg)	RS Fr	Houston HS; Creighton	Memphis, TN
G	13	Ma'Syn Howell (W)	6 ft 1 in (1.85 m)	180 lb (82 kg)	RS Fr	Legacy the School of Sport Sciences	Inglewood, CA
F	14	Moulaye Sissoko	6 ft 9 in (2.06 m)	245 lb (111 kg)	RS Sr	Lincoln Academy; Dayton	Bamako, Mali
G	20	Grayson Allo (W)	6 ft 5 in (1.96 m)	185 lb (84 kg)	RS Jr	Hebron HS	Carrollton, TX
G	23	Matthew Stone	6 ft 4 in (1.93 m)	200 lb (91 kg)	Sr	Kingfisher HS	Kingfisher, OK

Head coach

- Ross Hodge (East Texas A&M)

Assistant coach(es)

- Johnny Estelle (Texas A&M–Kingsville)
- Phil Forte (Oklahoma State)
- Jase Herl (Colorado Mesa)
- Andre Shaw (Western New England)
- Mike Randle (Eastern New Mexico)

Legend

- (C) Team captain
- (S) Suspended
- (I) Ineligible
- (W) Walk-on
- Injured
- Current redshirt

Roster

== Schedule and results ==
Date time, TV	Rank^{#}	Opponent^{#}	Result	Record	High points	High rebounds	High assists	Site (attendance) city, state
Non-conference regular season
November 5, 2024*; 7:00 p.m., ESPN+		Evansville	W 80–63	1–0	23 – Floyd	8 – Massie	5 – Floyd	The Super Pit (3,451); Denton, TX
November 7, 2024*; 7:30 p.m., ESPN+		Wayland Baptist	W 80–38	2–0	16 – Wright	10 – Walker	5 – Floyd	The Super Pit (3,235); Denton, TX
November 13, 2024*; 7:00 p.m., B1G+		at Minnesota	W 54–51	3–0	14 – Walker	6 – Tied	5 – Floyd	Williams Arena (7,743); Minneapolis, MN
November 18, 2024*; 6:00 p.m., ESPN+		at McNeese	L 61–68	3–1	12 – Lorient	8 – Massie	5 – Floyd	The Legacy Center (3,537); Lake Charles, LA
November 21, 2024*; 7:00 p.m., ESPN+		Texas Wesleyan	W 73–66	4–1	19 – Wright	4 – Tied	5 – Floyd	The Super Pit (2,690); Denton, TX
November 25, 2024*; 7:00 p.m., ESPN+		Oregon State	W 58–55	5–1	15 – Jossell	7 – Walker	3 – Tied	The Super Pit (3,292); Denton, TX
November 28, 2024*; 7:00 p.m., ESPNU		vs. Northern Iowa; NIT Season Tip-Off semifinals	W 68–48	6–1	18 – Wright	7 – Newell	3 – Tied	State Farm Field House (1,233); Bay Lake, FL
November 29, 2024*; 5:30 p.m., ESPN2		vs. Utah State; NIT Season Tip-Off championships	L 57–61	6–2	17 – Wright	6 – Tied	3 – Tied	State Farm Field House (1,154); Bay Lake, FL
December 6, 2024*; 7:00 p.m., ESPN+		at High Point	L 71–76	6–3	21 – Jossell	5 – Lorient	3 – Floyd	Qubein Center (3,978); High Point, NC
December 18, 2024*; 7:00 p.m., ESPN+		Mississippi Valley State	W 83–42	7–3	16 – Lorient	6 – Tied	5 – Tied	The Super Pit (2,568); Denton, TX
December 20, 2024*; 7:00 p.m., ESPN+		Appalachian State	W 68–64	8–3	17 – Lorient	10 – Sissoko	5 – Floyd	The Super Pit (2,666); Denton, TX
December 22, 2024*; 2:00 p.m., ESPN+		Houston Christian	W 62–46	9–3	14 – Massie	10 – Sissoko	2 – Tied	The Super Pit (2,727); Denton, TX
AAC regular season
December 31, 2024; 3:00 p.m., ESPNU		UAB	W 78–75	10–3 (1–0)	22 – Wright	5 – Tied	4 – Floyd	The Super Pit (2,979); Denton, TX
January 5, 2025; 4:00 p.m., ESPN		at No. 21 Memphis	L 64–68	10–4 (1–1)	18 – Lorient	8 – Sissoko	6 – Floyd	FedExForum (10,903); Memphis, TN
January 8, 2025; 8:00 p.m., ESPNU		Rice	W 81–59	11–4 (2–1)	21 – Wright	6 – Sissoko	3 – Lorient	The Super Pit (2,836); Denton, TX
January 14, 2025; 6:00 p.m., ESPN+		at East Carolina	W 69–60	12–4 (3–1)	22 – Wright	6 – Tied	4 – Jossell	Williams Arena (4,033); Greenville, NC
January 18, 2025; 3:00 p.m., ESPN+		at UTSA	W 72–57	13–4 (4–1)	22 – Wright	8 – Sissoko	6 – Floyd	Convocation Center (1,399); San Antonio, TX
January 22, 2025; 7:00 p.m., ESPN+		Temple	W 76–67	14–4 (5–1)	20 – Lorient	13 – Lorient	4 – Floyd	The Super Pit (4,029); Denton, TX
January 26, 2025; 1:00 p.m., ESPNU		Florida Atlantic	W 77–64	15–4 (6–1)	17 – Tied	13 – Sissoko	5 – Floyd	The Super Pit (3,715); Denton, TX
January 29, 2025; 6:30 p.m., ESPN+		at Wichita State	W 58–54	16–4 (7–1)	16 – Sissoko	8 – Massie	3 – Walker	Charles Koch Arena (5,845); Wichita, KS
February 1, 2025; 5:00 p.m., ESPN+		UTSA	L 50–54	16–5 (7–2)	14 – Newell	7 – Tied	4 – Floyd	The Super Pit (5,032); Denton, TX
February 3, 2025; 8:00 p.m., ESPN2		at UAB	L 61–64	16–6 (7–3)	15 – Floyd	11 – Sissoko	3 – Tied	Bartow Arena (4,318); Birmingham, AL
February 8, 2025; 2:00 p.m., ESPN+		Tulane	W 76–66	17–6 (8–3)	15 – Lorient	8 – Lorient	5 – Floyd	The Super Pit (4,156); Denton, TX
February 11, 2025; 8:00 p.m., ESPNU		at Rice	W 67–61	18–6 (9–3)	20 – Wright	9 – Sissoko	5 – Tied	Tudor Fieldhouse (1,617); Houston, TX
February 19, 2025; 7:00 p.m., ESPN+		Tulsa	W 63–44	19–6 (10–3)	27 – Sissoko	11 – Sissoko	5 – Floyd	The Super Pit (4,032); Denton, TX
February 23, 2025; 11:00 a.m., ESPNU		at South Florida	W 64–57	20–6 (11–3)	18 – Floyd	10 – Sissoko	3 – Tied	Yuengling Center (4,303); Tampa, FL
February 27, 2025; 6:00 p.m., ESPN2		at Florida Atlantic	W 71–61	21–6 (12–3)	16 – Lorient	8 – Lorient	5 – Lorient	Eleanor R. Baldwin Arena (3,161); Boca Raton, FL
March 3, 2025; 8:00 p.m., ESPN2		Wichita State	W 68–66	22–6 (13–3)	21 – Wright	5 – Sissoko	3 – Floyd	The Super Pit (3,924); Denton, TX
March 6, 2025; 8:00 p.m., ESPN2		Charlotte	W 75–64	23–6 (14–3)	42 – Wright	5 – Tied	4 – Floyd	The Super Pit (4,199); Denton, TX
March 9, 2025; 1:00 p.m., ESPN+		at Temple	L 61–66	23–7 (14–4)	18 – Wright	7 – Sissoko	4 – Floyd	Liacouras Center (3,276); Philadelphia, PA
AAC tournament
March 14, 2025; 6:00 p.m., ESPNU	(2)	vs. (10) Tulsa; Quarterfinals	W 77–59	24–7	24 – Wright	7 – Sissoko	5 – Floyd	Dickies Arena; Fort Worth, TX
March 15, 2025; 4:00 p.m., ESPN2	(2)	vs. (3) UAB; Semifinals	L 56–66	24–8	12 – Tied	11 – Lorient	3 – Floyd	Dickies Arena; Fort Worth, TX
NIT
March 19, 2025; 7:00 p.m., ESPN2	(2)	Furman; First Round – Dallas Region	W 75–65	25–8	19 – Floyd	6 – Floyd	7 – Floyd	The Super Pit (2,138); Denton, TX
March 23, 2025; 6:00 p.m., ESPNU	(2)	(3) Arkansas State; Second Round – Dallas Region	W 65–63	26–8	18 – Tied	8 – Lorient	4 – Floyd	The Super Pit (2,661); Denton, TX
March 25, 2025; 8:00 pm, ESPN2	(2)	at (4) Oklahoma State; Quarterfinals – Dallas Region	W 61–59	27–8	15 – Wright	7 – Newell	5 – Floyd	Gallagher-Iba Arena (4,089); Stillwater, OK
April 1, 2025*; 6:00 pm, ESPN	(2)	vs. (1) UC Irvine; Semifinals	L 67–69	27–9	25 – Wright	13 – Sissoko	3 – Floyd	Hinkle Fieldhouse (3,288); Indianapolis, IN
*Non-conference game. ^{#}Rankings from AP poll. (#) Tournament seedings in parentheses. All times are in Central.

Atin Wright scored 42 points tying his career high in his senior night game against Charlotte on March 6th, 2025.

== See also ==
- 2024–25 North Texas Mean Green women's basketball team
