= 2024 AP Poll =

2024 AP Poll may refer to:

- 2024 NCAA Division I FBS football rankings
- 2023–24 NCAA Division I men's basketball rankings
- 2024–25 NCAA Division I men's basketball rankings
- 2023–24 NCAA Division I women's basketball rankings
- 2024–25 NCAA Division I women's basketball rankings
