= 2025 AP Poll =

2025 AP Poll may refer to:

- 2025 NCAA Division I FBS football rankings
- 2024–25 NCAA Division I men's basketball rankings
- 2025–26 NCAA Division I men's basketball rankings
- 2024–25 NCAA Division I women's basketball rankings
- 2025–26 NCAA Division I women's basketball rankings
