= 2024–25 South Florida Bulls men's basketball team =

American college basketball season

2024–25 South Florida Bulls men's basketball
- Conference: American Athletic Conference
- Record: 13–19 (6–12 AAC)
- Head coach: Ben Fletcher (interim)
- Assistant coaches: Desmond Oliver; William Small; Griffin McHone
- Home arena: Yuengling Center

2024–25 American Athletic Conference men's basketball standings
	Conf.				Overall
Team	W		L	PCT	W		L	PCT
No. 25 Memphis †	16	–	2	.889	29	–	6	.829
North Texas	14	–	4	.778	27	–	9	.750
UAB	13	–	5	.722	24	–	13	.649
Tulane	12	–	6	.667	19	–	15	.559
Florida Atlantic	10	–	8	.556	18	–	16	.529
East Carolina	10	–	8	.556	19	–	14	.576
Temple	9	–	9	.500	17	–	15	.531
Wichita State	8	–	10	.444	19	–	15	.559
South Florida	6	–	12	.333	13	–	19	.406
Tulsa	6	–	12	.333	13	–	20	.394
UTSA	6	–	12	.333	12	–	19	.387
Rice	4	–	14	.222	13	–	19	.406
Charlotte	3	–	15	.167	11	–	22	.333
† 2025 AAC tournament winner Rankings from AP Poll

The 2024–25 South Florida Bulls men's basketball team represented the University of South Florida during the 2024–25 NCAA Division I men's basketball season. The season marked the 53rd basketball season for USF, and the 12th as a member of the American Athletic Conference. The Bulls played their home games at Yuengling Center on the university's Tampa, Florida campus. They were led by interim head coach Ben Fletcher after head coach Amir Abdur-Rahim died on October 24, 2024 at the age of 43.

== Previous season ==
The Bulls finished the 2023–24 season 25–8, 16–2 in AAC play to win the AAC championship. They defeated East Carolina in the quarterfinals of the AAC tournament before losing to UAB in the semifinals. They received at large bid to the National Invitation Tournament where they defeated UCF in the first round before losing to VCU in the second round.

In the Week 14 poll on February 12, 2024, USF received five votes in the Coaches Poll (unofficially ranking them 40th), marking the first time since the final poll of the 2011–12 season in which USF has received votes in the Coaches Poll. In addition, the school also received seven votes in the AP poll (unofficially ranking them 43rd), also marking the first time the school received votes in both polls in the same week, along with only the third time the school received votes in the AP poll, after receiving 58 in the Week 6 poll in 1991–92 and two in the Week 13 poll in 2009–10. The following week (Week 15), the school set a record for most votes received in the Coaches Poll, receiving 45 in AP and 35 in Coaches (unofficially ranking them 31st and 29th, respectively).

In their February 18 win against No. 24 Florida Atlantic, USF set a new attendance record with 10,659 fans packing the Yuengling Center.

On February 25 after their win against SMU combined with losses by Charlotte and Florida Atlantic that weekend, USF clinched at least a share of the conference regular season title for the first time in school history. On March 2, they would clinch the outright title with their win over Charlotte.

In the Week 16 poll on February 26, 2024, USF was ranked No. 25 in both the AP and Coaches polls, marking the first time in school history the team was officially ranked in either poll.

The Bulls were ranked No. 24 in both the AP and Coaches polls during week 17. After a loss to Tulsa in the final game of the season, USF would drop out of the AP Top 25 for week 18; however, they would receive votes, unofficially ranking them 27th in the nation. That loss would also snap the Bulls program record setting 15-game win streak.

On March 15, Amir Abdur-Rahim was named a Naismith College Coach of the Year semifinalist. Two days later, the Bulls were given a berth in the National Invitation Tournament, their first postseason berth since 2018–19. They beat rival Central Florida in the first round their 25th win of the season setting a new program record before losing to VCU in the second round, ending their season.

== Offseason ==
=== Departures ===
Name	Number	Pos.	Height	Weight	Year	Hometown	Reason for departure
Selton Miguel	1	G/F	6'4"	210	Junior	Luanda, Angola	Transferred to Maryland
Jose Placer	2	G	6'1"	184	(redshirt) Senior	Orlando, FL	Graduated
Chris Youngblood	3	G	6'4"	218	Senior	Tuscaloosa, AL	Graduate transferred to Alabama
Kasean Pryor	11	F	6'10"	200	Junior	Chicago, IL	Transferred to Louisville
Ammaar Balagam	14	G	6'4"	185	Freshman	Tucker, GA	Walk-on; left the team due to personal reasons
Sam Hines Jr.	20	F	6'6"	215	Junior	Marietta, GA	Transferred to Southeastern Louisiana
Gerald Jones III	21	F	6'10"	220	Sophomore	Wolfeboro, NH	Transferred to Chicago State
David Ogunleye	22	F	6'9"	235	Junior	Houston, TX	Transferred

=== Incoming transfers ===
Name	Num	Pos.	Height	Weight	Year	Hometown	Previous school
De'Ante Green	1	F	6'9"	210	Junior	Asheville, NC	Florida State
Jamille Reynolds	2	F	6' 11"	275	GS Senior	St. Petersburg, FL	Cincinnati
Jimmie Williams	3	G	6'5"		(redshirt) Sophomore	Euclid, OH	Wallace State CC
Kyle O'Hare	22	F	6'7"	205	Sophomore	Tampa, FL	Walk-on; Husson
Quincy Ademokoya	23	G	6'6"	170	GS Senior	Bloomington, IL	Kennesaw State
Jaylen Wharton	24	F	6'9"		Junior	Plant City, FL	Walters State CC

=== Recruiting classes ===
==== 2024 recruiting class ====
College recruiting information
Name	Hometown	School	Height	Weight	Commit date
C.J. Brown #44 PG	Marietta, GA	Kell High School	6 ft 2 in (1.88 m)	175 lb (79 kg)	Nov 8, 2023
C.J. Brown #44 PG	Recruit ratings: Rivals: 247Sports: ESPN: (80)				
Kameren Wright #67 SF	Gainesville, FL	The Rock School	6 ft 5 in (1.96 m)	180 lb (82 kg)	May 1, 2024
Kameren Wright #67 SF	Recruit ratings: Rivals: 247Sports: ESPN: (78)				
Overall recruit ranking:
Note: In many cases, Scout, Rivals, 247Sports, On3, and ESPN may conflict in their listings of height and weight.; In these cases, the average was taken. ESPN grades are on a 100-point scale.; Sources: "2024 Team Ranking". Rivals.

==== 2025 recruiting class ====
College recruiting information (2025)
Name	Hometown	School	Height	Weight	Commit date
Josh Lewis #20 SF	Tampa, FL	Howard W. Blake High School	6 ft 7 in (2.01 m)	200 lb (91 kg)	Nov 8, 2023
Josh Lewis #20 SF	Recruit ratings: Rivals: 247Sports: ESPN: (84)				
Overall recruit ranking:
Note: In many cases, Scout, Rivals, 247Sports, On3, and ESPN may conflict in their listings of height and weight.; In these cases, the average was taken. ESPN grades are on a 100-point scale.; Sources: "2025 Team Ranking". Rivals.

== Roster ==
2024–25 South Florida Bulls men's basketball team
Players
Coaches

Pos.	#	Name	Height	Weight	Year	Previous school	Hometown
G	0	Jayden Reid	5 ft 10 in (1.78 m)	161 lb (73 kg)	So	Long Island Lutheran	Westbury, NY
F	1	De'Ante Green	6 ft 9 in (2.06 m)	210 lb (95 kg)	Jr	Florida State	Asheville, NC
F	2	Jamille Reynolds	6 ft 11 in (2.11 m)	275 lb (125 kg)	GS	Cincinnati	St. Petersburg, FL
G	3	Jimmie Williams	6 ft 5 in (1.96 m)	210 lb (95 kg)	RS So	Wallace State CC	Solon, OH
G	4	Kobe Knox	6 ft 5 in (1.96 m)	195 lb (88 kg)	RS Jr	Grand Canyon	Tampa, FL
G	5	Brandon Stroud	6 ft 6 in (1.98 m)	215 lb (98 kg)	GS	Kennesaw State	Atlanta, GA
G	7	Kameren Wright	6 ft 6 in (1.98 m)	180 lb (82 kg)	Fr	Olympia HS	Orlando, FL
G	11	CJ Brown	6 ft 2 in (1.88 m)	175 lb (79 kg)	Fr	Kell HS	Marietta, GA
G	13	Kasen Jennings	6 ft 3 in (1.91 m)	202 lb (92 kg)	GS	Kennesaw State	Atlanta, GA
F	15	Corey Walker Jr.	6 ft 8 in (2.03 m)	215 lb (98 kg)	RS Sr	Tennessee	Jacksonville, FL
F	22	Kyle O'Hare (W)	6 ft 7 in (2.01 m)	205 lb (93 kg)	So	Husson	Tampa, FL
G	23	Quincy Ademokoya	6 ft 6 in (1.98 m)	170 lb (77 kg)	GS	Kennesaw State	Bloomington, IL
F	24	Jaylen Wharton	6 ft 9 in (2.06 m)	200 lb (91 kg)	Jr	Walters State CC	Plant City, FL
G	33	Nic Smith (W)	6 ft 0 in (1.83 m)	168 lb (76 kg)	So	Whitnall HS	Milwaukee, WI
C	34	Daniel Tobiloba	7 ft 0 in (2.13 m)	238 lb (108 kg)	So	Grand View Christian	Lagos, Nigeria
G	35	MaTaj Glover (W)	6 ft 2 in (1.88 m)	175 lb (79 kg)	Fr	Hebron Christian Academy	Atlanta, GA

Head coach

- Ben Fletcher (Troy)

Assistant coach(es)

- Desmond Oliver (Dominican (NY))
- William Small (Belhaven)
- Griffin McHone (Texas A&M)

Legend

- (C) Team captain
- (S) Suspended
- (I) Ineligible
- (W) Walk-on
- Injured
- Current redshirt

Roster

== Schedule and results ==
Date time, TV	Rank^{#}	Opponent^{#}	Result	Record	High points	High rebounds	High assists	Site (attendance) city, state
Exhibition
October 30, 2024*; 7:00 p.m.		Edward Waters	W 94–51		–	–	–	Yuengling Center; Tampa, FL
Non-conference regular season
November 4, 2024*; 8:30 p.m., SECN		vs. No. 21 Florida; Jacksonville Sports Foundation Invitational	L 83–98	0–1	17 – Reynolds	6 – Tied	4 – Reid	VyStar Veterans Memorial Arena (5,764); Jacksonville, FL
November 8, 2024*; 7:00 p.m., FloSports		at Charleston	L 71–86	0–2	14 – Tied	9 – Stroud	4 – Jennings	TD Arena (5,457); Charleston, SC
November 12, 2024*; 7:00 p.m., ESPN+		Arkansas–Pine Bluff	W 85–69	1–2	16 – Tied	14 – Green	6 – Reid	Yuengling Center (4,404); Tampa, FL
November 15, 2024*; 7:00 p.m., ESPN+		West Georgia	W 74–55	2–2	14 – Williams	11 – Reynolds	4 – Tied	Yuengling Center (4,411); Tampa, FL
November 21, 2024*; 2:30 p.m., ESPN2		vs. Portland; Myrtle Beach Invitational Quarterfinals	W 74–68	3–2	13 – Knox	6 – Tied	4 – Stroud	HTC Center (1,454); Conway, SC
November 22, 2024*; 2:00 p.m., ESPN2		vs. Middle Tennessee; Myrtle Beach Invitational Semifinals	L 88–95	3–3	18 – Reid	9 – Reynolds	4 – Reid	HTC Center (1,428); Conway, SC
November 24, 2024*; 1:00 p.m., ESPN2		vs. Wright State; Myrtle Beach Invitational 3rd place game	W 73–72	4–3	14 – Reid	14 – Reynolds	4 – Stroud	HTC Center (1,265); Conway, SC
December 2, 2024*; 7:00 p.m., ESPN+		Stetson	W 74–72	5–3	23 – Reid	9 – Reynolds	8 – Reid	Yuengling Center (3,408); Tampa, FL
December 7, 2024*; 12:30 p.m., USA		at Loyola Chicago	L 72–74	5–4	23 – Reid	11 – Reynolds	4 – Tied	Joseph J. Gentile Arena (3,124); Chicago, IL
December 14, 2024*; 4:00 p.m., Mountain West Network		at Utah State	L 67–88	5–5	12 – Ademokoya	6 – Reynolds	5 – Jennings	Smith Spectrum (7,644); Logan, UT
December 18, 2024*; 7:00 p.m., ESPN+		Bethune–Cookman	L 69–77	5–6	15 – Reynolds	6 – Tied	4 – Reid	Yuengling Center (3,748); Tampa, FL
December 21, 2024*; 4:00 p.m., ESPN+		East Texas A&M	W 88–62	6–6	19 – Knox	6 – Tied	10 – Reid	Yuengling Center (5,735); Tampa, FL
December 28, 2024*; 3:00 p.m., ESPN+		Webber International	W 106–49	7–6	16 – Stroud	8 – Green	6 – Williams	Yuengling Center (3,309); Tampa, FL
AAC regular season
December 31, 2024; 3:00 p.m., ESPN+		East Carolina	W 75–69	8–6 (1–0)	18 – Knox	11 – Reynolds	3 – Williams	Yuengling Center (3,265); Tampa, FL
January 6, 2025; 7:00 p.m., ESPN2		at Wichita State	W 91–72	9–6 (2–0)	22 – Reynolds	10 – Reynolds	5 – Reid	Charles Koch Arena (54,69); Wichita, KS
January 11, 2025; 2:00 p.m., ESPN+		at Tulane	L 70–73	9–7 (2–1)	19 – Reynolds	6 – Brown	6 – Brown	Devlin Fieldhouse (1,281); New Orleans, LA
January 15, 2025; 7:00 p.m., ESPN+		UAB	L 83–92	9–8 (2–2)	26 – Reid	5 – Tied	4 – Tied	Yuengling Center (4,572); Tampa, FL
January 18, 2025; 3:00 p.m., ESPN+		Tulsa	W 63–56	10–8 (3–2)	16 – Brown	8 – Green	2 – Tied	Yuengling Center (8,636); Tampa, FL
January 22, 2025; 7:00 p.m., ESPN+		at Charlotte	L 61–69	10–9 (3–3)	14 – Reid	7 – Stroud	2 – Tied	Dale F. Halton Arena (2,707); Charlotte, NC
January 25, 2025; 1:00 p.m., ESPN+		at East Carolina	L 55–64	10–10 (3–4)	17 – Knox	8 – Williams	4 – Tied	Williams Arena (4,701); Greenville, NC
January 28, 2025; 7:00 p.m., ESPNU		Rice	W 69–64	11–10 (4–4)	17 – Jennings	12 – Ademokoya	3 – Reid	Yuengling Center (4,238); Tampa, FL
February 2, 2025; 2:00 p.m., ESPN2		at Florida Atlantic	L 72–94	11–11 (4–5)	15 – Tied	10 – Reynolds	4 – Reid	Eleanor R. Baldwin Arena (3,161); Boca Raton, FL
February 6, 2025; 7:00 p.m., ESPN2		Temple	W 100–91 ^{2OT}	12–11 (5–5)	25 – Reynolds	12 – Reynolds	10 – Brown	Yuengling Center (3,729); Tampa, FL
February 9, 2025; 2:00 p.m., ESPN+		Wichita State	L 70–75	12–12 (5–6)	18 – Reynolds	6 – Reynolds	6 – Brown	Yuengling Center (3,730); Tampa, FL
February 13, 2025; 9:00 p.m., ESPN2		No. 14 Memphis	L 65–80	12–13 (5–7)	11 – Tied	8 – Reynolds	3 – Tied	Yuengling Center (5,059); Tampa, FL
February 16, 2025; 4:00 p.m., ESPN2		at UAB	L 78–85	12–14 (5–8)	27 – Reynolds	14 – Reynolds	5 – Brown	Bartow Arena (5,313); Birmingham, AL
February 19, 2025; 8:00 p.m., ESPN+		at UTSA	W 78–73	13–14 (6–8)	16 – Williams	17 – Stroud	3 – Tied	Convocation Center (1,234); San Antonio, TX
February 23, 2025; 12:00 p.m., ESPNU		North Texas	L 57–64	13–15 (6–9)	20 – Stroud	11 – Reynolds	6 – Stroud	Yuengling Center (4,303); Tampa, FL
February 26, 2025; 7:00 p.m., ESPN+		at Temple	L 71–73	13–16 (6–10)	17 – Reynolds	6 – Reynolds	3 – Tied	Liacouras Center (3,311); Philadelphia, PA
March 2, 2025; 12:00 p.m., ESPN2		Florida Atlantic	L 63–69	13–17 (6–11)	16 – Reid	10 – Stroud	4 – Tied	Yuengling Center (4,504); Tampa, FL
March 7, 2025; 9:00 p.m., ESPN2		at No. 16 Memphis	L 68–84	13–18 (6–12)	20 – Reid	13 – Stroud	4 – Brown	FedExForum (14,916); Memphis, TN
AAC tournament
March 13, 2025; 12:30 p.m., ESPNU	(9)	vs. (8) Wichita State; Second Round	L 68–73	13–19	19 – Reid	9 – Knox	3 – Reid	Dickies Arena; Fort Worth, TX
*Non-conference game. ^{#}Rankings from AP poll. (#) Tournament seedings in parentheses. All times are in Eastern Time.
