= Ben Fletcher (basketball) =

American basketball player and coach (born 1981)

Current position
- Title: Assistant coach
- Team: High Point
- Conference: Big South Conference

Biographical details
- Born: January 1, 1981 (age 45)
- Education: Troy University (2003)

Playing career
- 2001–2003: Troy

Coaching career (HC unless noted)
- 2003–2005: Troy (student assistant)
- 2005–2019: Troy (assistant)
- 2019–2023: Kennesaw State (assistant)
- 2023–2024: South Florida (assistant)
- 2024–2025: South Florida (interim HC)
- 2025–present: High Point (assistant)

Head coaching record
- Overall: 13–19 (.406)

Benjamin G. Fletcher (born January 1, 1981) is a college basketball coach who is currently an assistant coach for the High Point Panthers. He previously served as the interim head coach for the South Florida Bulls.

== Playing career ==
Fletcher played for the Troy Trojans from 2001 to 2003, where he played in 59 career games with 58 starts, where he averaged 13.4 points per game, 2.6 rebounds per game, 1.3 assists per game, and 1.3 steals per game, while also being named to the 2003 Atlantic Sun (ASUN) all-conference team, and being named the 2002 ASUN Conference Tournament MVP.

== Coaching career ==
Fletcher started his coaching career in 2005 as an assistant coach at his alma mater, Troy University. In 2019, Fletcher left the Trojans, joining Kennesaw State as an assistant coach. Prior to the 2023 season, Fletcher joined South Florida as an assistant coach. In June 2024, Fletcher was promoted by the Bulls to serve as the team's associate head coach.

On October 29, 2024, Fletcher was named the interim head coach for the South Florida Bulls five days after the death of former head coach Amir Abdur-Rahim.

Fletcher joined the coaching staff at High Point University on May 18, 2025.

== Head coaching record ==
Record table
Season	Team	Overall	Conference	Standing	Postseason
South Florida Bulls (American Athletic Conference) (2024–2025)
2024–25	South Florida	13–19	6–12	T–9th	
South Florida:		13–19 (.406)	6–12 (.333)		
Total:		13–19 (.406)			
National champion Postseason invitational champion Conference regular season champion Conference regular season and conference tournament champion Division regular season champion Division regular season and conference tournament champion Conference tournament champion
