= 2024–25 Memphis Tigers men's basketball team =

American college basketball season

2024–25 Memphis Tigers men's basketball

AAC regular season and tournament champions

NCAA tournament, First Round
- Conference: American Athletic Conference

Ranking
- AP: No. 25
- Record: 29–6 (16–2 AAC)
- Head coach: Penny Hardaway (7th season)
- Assistant coaches: Mike Davis; Nolan Smith
- Home arena: FedExForum (Capacity: 18,119)

2024–25 American Athletic Conference men's basketball standings
	Conf.				Overall
Team	W		L	PCT	W		L	PCT
No. 25 Memphis †	16	–	2	.889	29	–	6	.829
North Texas	14	–	4	.778	27	–	9	.750
UAB	13	–	5	.722	24	–	13	.649
Tulane	12	–	6	.667	19	–	15	.559
Florida Atlantic	10	–	8	.556	18	–	16	.529
East Carolina	10	–	8	.556	19	–	14	.576
Temple	9	–	9	.500	17	–	15	.531
Wichita State	8	–	10	.444	19	–	15	.559
South Florida	6	–	12	.333	13	–	19	.406
Tulsa	6	–	12	.333	13	–	20	.394
UTSA	6	–	12	.333	12	–	19	.387
Rice	4	–	14	.222	13	–	19	.406
Charlotte	3	–	15	.167	11	–	22	.333
† 2025 AAC tournament winner Rankings from AP Poll

The 2024–25 Memphis Tigers men's basketball team represented the University of Memphis in the 2024–25 NCAA Division I men's basketball season. The Tigers, led by seventh-year head coach Penny Hardaway, played their home games at FedExForum as members of the American Athletic Conference. They finished the season 29–6, 16–2 in AAC play to win the conference championship. They defeated Wichita State, Tulane, and UAB to win the AAC tournament championship. As a result, they received the conference's automatic bid to the NCAA tournament as the No. 5 seed in the West region. There they were upset in the first round by Colorado State.

== Previous season ==
The Tigers finished the 2023–24 season 22–10, 11–7 in AAC play, to finish in a tie for fifth place. As a No. 5 seed in the AAC tournament they lost in the second round to Wichita State.

== Offseason ==
=== Departing players ===
Name	Number	Pos.	Height	Weight	Year	Hometown	Reason for departure
Jonathan Pierre	0	F	6'9"	210	Junior	Hallandale Beach, FL	Transferred to Belmont
Jayhlon Young	1	G	6'2"	175	(redshirt) Junior	Dallas, TX	Transferred to Maryland
Jordan Brown	3	F	6'11"	225	(redshirt) Senior	Roseville, CA	Graduated/signed to play professionally in Croatia with KK Dubrava
Ashton Hardaway	4	F	6'8"	210	Freshman	Carson, CA	Transferred to Saint Mary's
Carl Cherenfant	5	G	6'5"	195	Freshman	Pompano Beach, FL	Transferred to New Mexico State
Nae'Qwan Tomlin	7	F	6'10"	210	Senior	New York, NY	Graduated
David Jones	8	F	6'6"	210	Senior	Santo Domingo, DR	Graduated/undrafted in 2024 NBA draft; signed with the Philadelphia 76ers
Caleb Mills	9	G	6'5"	185	(redshirt) Senior	Arden, NC	Graduated
Jaykown Walton	10	G	6'7"	206	(redshirt) Senior	Columbus, GA	Graduated/undrafted in 2024 NBA draft; signed with the Oklahoma City Thunder
Jahvon Quinerly	11	G	6'1"	175	GS Senior	Hackensack, NJ	Graduated
Malcolm Dandridge	23	C	6'9"	260	(redshirt) Senior	Memphis, TN	Graduated
Jayden Hardway	25	G	6'5"	205	GS Senior	Memphis, TN	Walk-on; graduated
JJ Taylor	44	F	6'8"	180	Freshman	Chicago, IL	Midseason transferred to UCF
Mikey Williams		G	6'3"	185	Freshman	San Diego, CA	Mid-season transferred to UCF

=== Incoming transfers ===
Name	Number	Pos.	Height	Weight	Year	Hometown	Previous school
Colby Rogers	3	G	6'4"	190	(redshirt) Senior	Covington, GA	Wichita State
PJ Haggerty	4	G	6'3"	195	(redshirt) Sophomore	Crosby, TX	Tulsa
Tyreek Smith	5	F	6'8"	225	GS Senior	Baton Rouge, LA	SMU
Baraka Okojie	6	G	6'3"	175	Sophomore	Brampton, ON	George Mason
PJ Carter	7	G	6'5"	175	Senior	Atlanta, GA	UTSA
Tyrese Hunter	11	G	6'0"	175	Senior	Racine, WI	Texas
Moussa Cissé	32	F	7'0"	230	GS Senior	Conakry, Guinea	Ole Miss
Dain Dainja	42	F/C	6'9"	255	(redshirt) Senior	Brooklyn Park, MN	Illinois

=== 2024 recruiting class ===
College recruiting information
Name	Hometown	School	Height	Weight	Commit date
Jared Harris #9 PG	Silsbee, TX	Silsbee High School	6 ft 3 in (1.91 m)	170 lb (77 kg)	Sep 10, 2023
Jared Harris #9 PG	Recruit ratings: Rivals: 247Sports: ESPN: (83)				
Overall recruit ranking: Rivals: 1 247Sports: 1
Note: In many cases, Scout, Rivals, 247Sports, On3, and ESPN may conflict in their listings of height and weight.; In these cases, the average was taken. ESPN grades are on a 100-point scale.; Sources: "Memphis 2024 Basketball Commitments". Rivals.; "2024 Memphis Tigers Recruiting Class". ESPN.; "2024 Team Ranking". Rivals.; "2024 Memphis Tigers Basketball 24/7 Sports Commits". 247Sports.

== Roster ==
2024–25 Memphis Tigers men's basketball team
Players
Coaches

Pos.	#	Name	Height	Weight	Year	Previous school	Hometown
F	0	Damarien Yates	6 ft 5 in (1.96 m)	206 lb (93 kg)	So	Vincennes	Somerville, TN
G	1	Jared Harris	6 ft 2 in (1.88 m)	178 lb (81 kg)	Fr	Silsbee HS	Silsbee, TX
F	2	Nick Jourdain	6 ft 7 in (2.01 m)	231 lb (105 kg)	Sr	Temple	Clinton, NJ
G	3	Colby Rogers	6 ft 3 in (1.91 m)	196 lb (89 kg)	RS Sr	Wichita State	Covington, GA
G	4	PJ Haggerty	6 ft 3 in (1.91 m)	191 lb (87 kg)	RS So	Tulsa	Crosby, TX
F	5	Tyreek Smith	6 ft 8 in (2.03 m)	225 lb (102 kg)	GS	SMU	Baton Rouge, LA
G	6	Baraka Okojie	6 ft 1 in (1.85 m)	192 lb (87 kg)	So	George Mason	Brampton, ON
G	7	PJ Carter	6 ft 4 in (1.93 m)	175 lb (79 kg)	Sr	UTSA	Atlanta, GA
G	8	Ragi Phillips	5 ft 11 in (1.8 m)	175 lb (79 kg)	Jr	Lane	Memphis, TN
G	11	Tyrese Hunter	6 ft 0 in (1.83 m)	180 lb (82 kg)	Sr	Texas	Racine, WI
G	15	Noah Stansbury (W)	6 ft 0 in (1.83 m)	159 lb (72 kg)	RS Sr	Western Kentucky	Bowling Green, KY
F	23	Bouna Kebe	6 ft 7 in (2.01 m)	197 lb (89 kg)	Jr	Gillette College	Dakar, Senegal
C	32	Moussa Cissé	6 ft 11 in (2.11 m)	229 lb (104 kg)	GS	Ole Miss	Conakry, Guinea
F	42	Dain Dainja	6 ft 9 in (2.06 m)	255 lb (116 kg)	RS Sr	Illinois	Brooklyn Park, MN

Head coach

- Penny Hardaway (Memphis)

Assistant coach(es)

- Mike Davis (Alabama)
- Nolan Smith (Duke)

Legend

- (C) Team captain
- (S) Suspended
- (I) Ineligible
- (W) Walk-on
- Injured
- Current redshirt

Roster

== Schedule and results ==
Date time, TV	Rank^{#}	Opponent^{#}	Result	Record	High points	High rebounds	High assists	Site (attendance) city, state
Exhibition
October 15, 2024*; 6:00 p.m., ESPNU		No. 9 North Carolina; Hoops for St. Jude Tip Off Classic	L 76–84		24 – Haggerty	9 – Tied	4 – Okojie	FedExForum; Memphis, TN
October 28, 2024*; 7:00 p.m., ESPN+		vs. No. 2 Alabama; Rocket City Classic	L 88–96		32 – Haggerty	9 – Haggerty	6 – Hunter	Propst Arena (6,652); Huntsville, AL
Non-conference regular season
November 4, 2024*; 7:00 p.m., ESPN+		Missouri	W 83–75	1–0	25 – Haggerty	8 – Dainja	5 – Haggerty	FedExForum (11,709); Memphis, TN
November 9, 2024*; 5:00 p.m., MW Network		at UNLV	W 80–74	2–0	29 – Haggerty	11 – Dainja	4 – Dainja	Thomas & Mack Center (6,510); Paradise, NV
November 15, 2024*; 7:00 p.m., ESPN+		Ohio	W 94–70	3–0	23 – Haggerty	8 – Jourdain	6 – Hunter	FedExForum (11,270); Memphis, TN
November 21, 2024*; 9:00 p.m., ESPNU		vs. San Francisco; USF Legacy Showcase	W 68–64	4–0	18 – Dainja	7 – Tied	5 – Hunter	Chase Center; San Francisco, CA
November 25, 2024*; 1:30 p.m., ESPN2		vs. No. 2 UConn; Maui Invitational quarterfinals	W 99–97 ^{OT}	5–0	26 – Hunter	8 – Cissé	5 – Haggerty	Lahaina Civic Center (2,400); Lahaina, HI
November 26, 2024*; 5:00 p.m., ESPN		vs. Michigan State; Maui Invitational semifinals	W 71–63	6–0	23 – Hunter	9 – Haggerty	4 – Haggerty	Lahaina Civic Center (2,400); Lahaina, HI
November 27, 2024*; 4:00 p.m., ESPN		vs. No. 4 Auburn; Maui Invitational championship	L 76–90	6–1	27 – Haggerty	9 – Haggerty	5 – Hunter	Lahaina Civic Center (2,400); Lahaina, HI
December 4, 2024*; 7:00 p.m., ESPN+	No. 16	Louisiana Tech	W 81–71	7–1	23 – Haggerty	9 – Cisse	6 – Haggerty	FedExForum (10,543); Memphis, TN
December 8, 2024*; 3:00 p.m., ESPNU	No. 16	Arkansas State	L 72–85	7–2	29 – Haggerty	12 – Dainja	3 – Hunter	FedExForum (10,983); Memphis, TN
December 14, 2024*; 10:00 a.m., ESPN2		at No. 16 Clemson	W 87–82 ^{OT}	8–2	23 – Hunter	8 – Tied	6 – Haggerty	Littlejohn Coliseum (8,148); Clemson, SC
December 18, 2024*; 6:00 p.m., ESPN2	No. 21	at Virginia	W 64–62	9–2	27 – Haggerty	11 – Dainja	5 – Haggerty	John Paul Jones Arena (12,108); Charlottesville, VA
December 21, 2024*; 11:30 a.m., CBS	No. 21	Mississippi State	L 66–79	9–3	24 – Haggerty	9 – Dainja	3 – Hunter	FedExForum (14,565); Memphis, TN
December 28, 2024*; 1:00 p.m., ESPN2		No. 16 Ole Miss	W 87–70	10–3	28 – Rogers	11 – Cisse	6 – Tied	FedExForum (15,643); Memphis, TN
AAC regular season
January 2, 2025; 6:00 p.m., ESPN2	No. 21	at Florida Atlantic	W 90–62	11–3 (1–0)	20 – Hunter	11 – Cisse	4 – Tied	Eleanor R. Baldwin Arena (3,161); Boca Raton, FL
January 5, 2025; 4:00 p.m., ESPN	No. 21	North Texas	W 68–64	12–3 (2–0)	27 – Haggerty	6 – Hunter	2 – Hunter	FedExForum (10,903); Memphis, TN
January 11, 2025; 1:00 p.m., ESPN+	No. 19	East Carolina	W 74–70	13–3 (3–0)	25 – Haggerty	5 – Tied	4 – Harris	FedExForum (10,862); Memphis, TN
January 16, 2025; 6:00 p.m., ESPN2	No. 18	at Temple	L 81–88	13–4 (3–1)	21 – Haggerty	5 – Dainja	6 – Hunter	Liacouras Center (5,719); Philadelphia, PA
January 19, 2025; 2:00 p.m., ESPN2	No. 18	at Charlotte	W 77–68	14–4 (4–1)	18 – Haggerty	9 – Dainja	5 – Hunter	Dale F. Halton Arena (3,855); Charlotte, NC
January 23, 2025; 6:00 p.m., ESPN2	No. 24	Wichita State	W 61–53	15–4 (5–1)	22 – Haggerty	8 – Dainja	4 – Haggerty	FedExForum (10,725); Memphis, TN
January 26, 2025; 12:00 p.m., ESPN2	No. 24	UAB; Battle for the Bones	W 100–77	16–4 (6–1)	23 – Haggerty	8 – Tied	9 – Haggerty	FedExForum (12,051); Memphis, TN
January 30, 2025; 8:00 p.m., ESPN2	No. 19	at Tulane	W 68–56	17–4 (7–1)	19 – Dainja	10 – Dainja	5 – Tied	Devlin Fieldhouse (3,445); New Orleans, LA
February 2, 2025; 2:00 p.m., ESPN+	No. 19	at Rice	W 86–83	18–4 (8–1)	26 – Haggerty	8 – Haggerty	5 – Tied	Tudor Fieldhouse (2,278); Houston, TX
February 5, 2025; 7:00 p.m., ESPN+	No. 17	Tulsa	W 83–71	19–4 (9–1)	23 – Haggerty	6 – Tied	4 – Tied	FedExForum (10,237); Memphis, TN
February 9, 2025; 1:00 p.m., ESPN2	No. 17	Temple	W 90–82	20–4 (10–1)	20 – Haggerty	8 – Dainja	7 – Haggerty	FedExForum (11,007); Memphis, TN
February 13, 2025; 8:00 p.m., ESPN2	No. 14	at South Florida	W 80–65	21–4 (11–1)	20 – Dainja	9 – Jourdain	4 – Haggerty	Yuengling Center (5,059); Tampa, FL
February 16, 2025; 11:00 a.m., ESPN	No. 14	at Wichita State	L 79–84 ^{OT}	21–5 (11–2)	24 – Hunter	14 – Cisse	6 – Haggerty	Charles Koch Arena (6,294); Wichita, KS
February 23, 2025; 1:00 p.m., ESPN2	No. 22	Florida Atlantic	W 84–65	22–5 (12–2)	22 – Tied	11 – Tied	8 – Hunter	FedExForum (12,532); Memphis, TN
February 26, 2025; 7:00 p.m., ESPN+	No. 18	Rice	W 84–72	23–5 (13–2)	25 – Dainja	10 – Dainja	5 – Haggerty	FedExForum (11,012); Memphis, TN
March 2, 2025; 3:00 p.m., ESPN	No. 18	at UAB; Battle for the Bones	W 88–81	24–5 (14–2)	25 – Haggerty	17 – Dainja	4 – Haggerty	Bartow Arena (8,424); Birmingham, AL
March 4, 2025; 6:00 p.m., ESPN+	No. 16	at UTSA	W 75–70	25–5 (15–2)	19 – Dainja	8 – Tied	3 – Tied	Convocation Center (1,429); San Antonio, TX
March 7, 2025; 8:00 p.m., ESPN2	No. 16	South Florida	W 84–68	26–5 (16–2)	20 – Tied	9 – Jourdain	7 – Hunter	FedExForum (14,916); Memphis, TN
AAC tournament
March 14, 2025; 12:00 p.m., ESPN2	(1) No. 16	vs. (8) Wichita State; Quarterfinals	W 83–80	27–5	42 – Haggerty	9 – Haggerty	7 – Hunter	Dickies Arena; Fort Worth, TX
March 15, 2025; 2:00 p.m., ESPN2	(1) No. 16	vs. (4) Tulane; Semifinals	W 78–77	28–5	23 – Dainja	11 – tied	5 – Haggerty	Dickies Arena; Fort Worth, TX
March 16, 2025; 2:00 p.m., ESPN	(1) No. 16	vs. (3) UAB; Final	W 84–72	29–5	39 – Dainja	14 – Cissé	4 – Tied	Dickies Arena (5,119); Fort Worth, TX
NCAA tournament
March 21, 2025; 1:00 p.m., TBS	(5 W) No. 16	vs. (12 W) Colorado State; First Round	L 70–78	29–6	22 – Dainja	12 – Dainja	4 – Okojie	Climate Pledge Arena (17,024); Seattle, WA
*Non-conference game. ^{#}Rankings from AP poll. (#) Tournament seedings in parentheses. W=West. All times are in Central Time.

== Rankings ==
Ranking movements Legend: ██ Increase in ranking ██ Decrease in ranking — = Not ranked RV = Received votes
	Week																				
Poll	Pre	1	2	3	4	5	6	7	8	9	10	11	12	13	14	15	16	17	18	19	Final
AP	—	RV	RV	RV	16	RV	21	RV	21	19	18	24	19	17	14	22	18	16	16	16	25
Coaches	—	—	—	RV	15	RV	22	RV	25	20	17	22	16	15	14	19	18	16	17	16	RV
