= 2024–25 NCAA Division I men's basketball rankings =

Rankings for the 2024–25 NCAA Division I men's basketball season

- Season: 2024–25
- NCAA Tournament: 2025
- Preseason No. 1: Kansas
- NCAA Tournament Champions: Florida
NCAA Division I men's basketball rankings
← 2023–24

Two human polls make up the 2024–25 NCAA Division I men's basketball rankings, the AP poll and the Coaches Poll, in addition to various publications' preseason polls.

== Legend ==
	Increase in ranking
	Decrease in ranking
	New to rankings from previous week
	No movement from previous week
Italics	Number of first-place votes
(#–#)	Win–loss record
т	Tied with team above or below also with this symbol

== AP poll ==
	Preseason Oct 14	Week 2 Nov 11	Week 3 Nov 18	Week 4 Nov 25	Week 5 Dec 2	Week 6 Dec 9	Week 7 Dec 16	Week 8 Dec 23	Week 9 Dec 30	Week 10 Jan 6	Week 11 Jan 13	Week 12 Jan 20	Week 13 Jan 27	Week 14 Feb 3	Week 15 Feb 10	Week 16 Feb 17	Week 17 Feb 24	Week 18 Mar 3	Week 19 Mar 10	Week 20 Mar 17	Final April 8	
1.	Kansas (30)	Kansas (2–0) (44)	Kansas (4–0) (49)	Kansas (5–0) (51)	Kansas (7–0) (35)	Tennessee (8–0) (58)	Tennessee (10–0) (50)	Tennessee (11–0) (41)	Tennessee (12–0) (41)	Tennessee (14–0) (45)	Auburn (15–1) (60)	Auburn (17–1) (62)	Auburn (18–1) (62)	Auburn (20–1) (62)	Auburn (21–2) (34)	Auburn (23–2) (59)	Auburn (25–2) (60)	Auburn (27–2) (61)	Duke (28–3) (52)	Duke (31–3) (49)	Florida (36–4) (61)	1.
2.	Alabama (14)	Alabama (2–0) (6)	UConn (3–0) (7)	UConn (4–0) (6)	Auburn (7–0) (26)	Auburn (8–1) (3)	Auburn (9–1) (12)	Auburn (11–1) (21)	Auburn (11–1) (20)	Auburn (13–1) (15)	Iowa State (14–1)	Duke (16–2)	Duke (17–2)	Duke (19–2)	Alabama (20–3) (23)	Florida (22–3) (1)	Duke (24–3)	Duke (26–3)	Houston (27–4) (5)	Houston (30–4) (6)	Houston (35–5)	2.
3.	UConn (11)	UConn (2–0) (7)	Gonzaga (3–0) (2)	Gonzaga (5–0) (2)	Tennessee (7–0)	Iowa State (7–1) (1)	Iowa State (9–1)	Iowa State (10–1)	Iowa State (10–1)	Iowa State (12–1)	Duke (14–2) (1)	Iowa State (15–2)	Iowa State (17–2)	Alabama (19–3)	Florida (20–3) (3) т	Duke (22–3)	Florida (24–3)	Houston (25–4)	Auburn (27–4) (4)	Florida (30–4) (2)	Duke (35–4)	3.
4.	Houston (4)	Gonzaga (2–0) (3)	Auburn (3–0) (3)	Auburn (4–0) (3)	Kentucky (7–0)	Duke (7–2)	Kentucky (10–1)	Duke (10–2)	Duke (10–2)	Duke (12–2)	Alabama (14–2)	Alabama (15–3)	Alabama (17–3)	Tennessee (18–4)	Duke (20–3) т	Alabama (21–4)	Houston (23–4)	Tennessee (24–5)	Florida (27–4)	Auburn (28–5) (2)	Auburn (32–6)	4.
5.	Iowa State	Auburn (2–0) (2)	Iowa State (3–0)	Iowa State (3–0)	Marquette (8–0)	Kentucky (8–1)	Duke (8–2)	Alabama (10–2)	Alabama (11–2)	Alabama (12–2)	Florida (15–1) (1)	Florida (16–2)	Florida (18–2)	Houston (17–4)	Tennessee (20–4) (1)	Houston (21–4)	Tennessee (22–5)	Florida (25–4)	Alabama (24–7)	St. John's (30–4)	Tennessee (30–8)	5.
6.	Gonzaga (1)	Duke (2–0)	Purdue (4–0)	Houston (3–1)	Iowa State (5–1)	Marquette (9–1)	Alabama (8–2)	Florida (12–0)	Florida (13–0)	Kentucky (12–2)	Tennessee (15–1)	Tennessee (16–2)	Houston (16–3)	Florida (18–3)	Houston (19–4)	Tennessee (21–5)	Alabama (22–5)	St. John's (26–4)	St. John's (27–4)	Tennessee (27–7)	Alabama (28–9)	6.
7.	Duke	Iowa State (1–0)	Houston (2–1)	Tennessee (6–0)	Gonzaga (7–1)	Alabama (7–2)	Florida (10–0)	Kansas (9–2)	Kansas (9–2)	Marquette (13–2)	Marquette (14–2)	Houston (14–3)	Michigan State (17–2)	Purdue (17–5)	Purdue (19–5)	Texas A&M (20–5)	St. John's (24–4)	Alabama (23–6)	Michigan State (26–5)	Alabama (25–8)	Michigan State (30–7)	7.
8.	Baylor	Houston (1–1)	Alabama (3–1)	Kentucky (5–0)	Purdue (7–1)	Gonzaga (7–2)	Kansas (8–2)	Marquette (11–2)	Marquette (11–2)	Florida (13–1)	Kentucky (13–3)	Michigan State (16–2)	Tennessee (17–3)	Iowa State (17–4)	Texas A&M (18–5)	Iowa State (20–5)	Michigan State (22–5)	Michigan State (24–5)	Tennessee (25–6)	Michigan State (27–6)	Texas Tech (28–9)	8.
9.	North Carolina	Arizona (2–0)	Kentucky (3–0)	Alabama (4–1)	Duke (5–2)	Florida (9–0)	Marquette (9–2)	Oregon (11–1)	Oregon (12–1)	UConn (12–3)	Kansas (12–3)	Kentucky (14–4)	Marquette (17–3)	Michigan State (18–3)	St. John's (21–3)	Texas Tech (20–5)	Iowa State (21–6)	Texas Tech (22–7)	Texas Tech (24–7)	Texas Tech (25–8)	Maryland (27–9)	9.
10.	Arizona	North Carolina (1–1)	North Carolina (2–1)	Marquette (6–0)	Alabama (6–2)	Kansas (7–2)	Oregon (10–1)	Kentucky (10–2)	Kentucky (10–2)	Texas A&M (12–2)	Houston (12–3)	Marquette (15–3)	Purdue (16–5)	Texas A&M (17–5)	Iowa State (18–5)	St. John's (22–4)	Texas Tech (21–6)	Iowa State (22–7)	Clemson (26–5)	Louisville (27–7)	Michigan (27–10)	10.
11.	Auburn	Tennessee (2–0)	Tennessee (4–0)	Duke (4–1)	Wisconsin (8–0)	Purdue (8–2)	UConn (8–3)	UConn (10–3)	UConn (10–3)	Kansas (10–3)	Texas A&M (13–3)	Purdue (15–4)	Kansas (14–5)	Marquette (18–4)	Michigan State (19–4)	Wisconsin (20–5)	Wisconsin (21–6)	Clemson (24–5)	Maryland (24–7)	Maryland (25–8)	St. John's (31–5)	11.
12.	Tennessee	Baylor (1–1)	Duke (3–1)	North Carolina (3–1)	Oregon (8–0)	Oregon (9–1)	Texas A&M (9–2)	Oklahoma (12–0)	Oklahoma (13–0)	Houston (10–3)	Michigan State (14–2)	Kansas (13–4)	Kentucky (14–5)	St. John's (19–3)	Texas Tech (18–5)	Michigan (20–5)	Texas A&M (20–7)	Wisconsin (22–7)	Iowa State (23–8)	Clemson (27–6)	Kentucky (24–12)	12.
13.	Texas A&M	Purdue (2–0)	Baylor (3–1)	Purdue (5–1)	Florida (8–0)	Oklahoma (9–0)	Gonzaga (7–3)	Texas A&M (10–2)	Texas A&M (11–2)	Illinois (11–3)	Oregon (15–2)	Texas A&M (14–4)	Texas A&M (15–5)	Texas Tech (17–4)	Arizona (17–6)	Purdue (19–7)	Clemson (22–5)	Maryland (22–7)	Louisville (25–6)	Wisconsin (26–9)	BYU (26–10)	13.
14.	Purdue	Creighton (2–0)	Creighton (4–0)	Indiana (4–0)	Cincinnati (6–0)	Michigan (8–1)	Oklahoma (10–0)	Gonzaga (9–3)	Houston (8–3)	Mississippi State (13–1)	UConn (13–4)	Mississippi State (15–3)	Mississippi State (16–4)	Kentucky (15–6)	Memphis (20–4)	Michigan State (20–5)	Missouri (20–7)	Louisville (23–6)	Texas A&M (22–9)	Michigan (25–9)	Purdue (24–12)	14.
15.	Creighton	Marquette (2–0)	Marquette (4–0)	Wisconsin (7–0)	Baylor (5–2)	Houston (5–3)	Houston (6–3)	Houston (8–3)	UCLA (11–2)	Oregon (13–2)	Mississippi State (14–2)	Oregon (15–3)	St. John's (17–3)	Missouri (17–4)	Kentucky (16–7)	Missouri (19–6)	Michigan (20–6)	Missouri (21–8)	Kentucky (21–10)	Iowa State (24–9)	Arizona (24–13)	15.
16.	Arkansas	Indiana (2–0)	Indiana (3–0)	Cincinnati (5–0)	Memphis (6–1)	Clemson (9–1)	Purdue (8–3)	Ole Miss (11–1)	Cincinnati (10–1)	Michigan State (12–2)	Gonzaga (14–4)	Ole Miss (15–3)	Oregon (16–4)	Kansas (15–6)	Wisconsin (19–5)	Marquette (19–6)	Maryland (21–6)	Memphis (24–5)	Memphis (26–5)	Memphis (29–5)	Wisconsin (27–10)	16.
17.	Indiana	Cincinnati (2–0)	Arizona (2–1)	Baylor (4–2)	Houston (4–3)	Texas A&M (8–2)	Ole Miss (9–1)	Cincinnati (10–1)	Mississippi State (11–1)	Oklahoma (13–1)	Purdue (13–4)	Illinois (13–5)	Wisconsin (16–4)	Memphis (18–4)	Kansas (16–7)	Kentucky (17–8)	Kentucky (18–9)	Michigan (22–7)	BYU (23–8)	BYU (24–9)	Iowa State (25–10)	17.
18.	Marquette	Arkansas (1–1)	Cincinnati (3–0)	Florida (6–0)	Pittsburgh (7–1)	UConn (7–3)	UCLA (9–1)	Michigan State (10–2)	Michigan State (10–2)	Gonzaga (12–4)	Memphis (13–3)	Wisconsin (15–3)	Illinois (14–6)	Maryland (17–5)	Marquette (18–6)	Clemson (21–5)	Memphis (22–5)	Purdue (20–9)	Wisconsin (23–8)	Kentucky (22–11)	Ole Miss (24–12)	18.
19.	Texas	Kentucky (2–0)	Wisconsin (4–0)	Arkansas (4–1)	Illinois (6–1)	Ole Miss (8–1)	Cincinnati (8–1)	Mississippi State (10–2)	Gonzaga (9–4)	Memphis (12–3)	Illinois (12–4)	UConn (13–5)	Memphis (16–4)	UConn (16–6)	Ole Miss (18–6)	Arizona (17–8)	Louisville (21–6)	Kentucky (19–10)	Saint Mary's (27–4)	Texas A&M (22–10)	Texas A&M (23–11)	19.
20.	Cincinnati	Florida (2–0)	Arkansas (2–1)	Texas A&M (4–1)	North Carolina (4–3)	Wisconsin (8–2)	Michigan State (8–2)	San Diego State (8–2)	Purdue (9–4)	Purdue (11–4)	Michigan (13–3)	St. John's (16–3)	Missouri (16–4)	Arizona (15–6)	Michigan (18–5)	Maryland (20–6)	Purdue (19–9)	Marquette (22–7)	Purdue (21–10)	Saint Mary's (28–5)	Arkansas (22–14)	20.
21.	Florida	Ohio State (1–0)	Florida (4–0)	Creighton (4–1)	Oklahoma (7–0)	Michigan State (8–2)	Memphis (8–2)	Purdue (8–4)	Memphis (10–3)	West Virginia (11–2)	Ole Miss (14–2)	Michigan (14–4)	Louisville (15–5)	Wisconsin (17–5)	Missouri (17–6)	Mississippi State (18–7)	Marquette (20–7)	Saint Mary's (27–4)	Missouri (21–10)	Arizona (22–12)	Louisville (27–8)	21.
22.	UCLA	St. John's (2–0)	St. John's (4–0)	Xavier (5–0)	Texas A&M (6–2)	Cincinnati (7–1)	Dayton (9–2)	UCLA (10–2)	Illinois (9–3)	UCLA (11–3)	Utah State (16–1)	Missouri (15–3)	Texas Tech (15–4)	Mississippi State (16–6)	Mississippi State (17–6)	Memphis (21–5)	Arizona (18–9)	Texas A&M (20–9)	Michigan (22–9)	Purdue (22–11)	Clemson (27–7)	22.
23.	Kentucky	Texas A&M (1–1)	Texas A&M (3–1)	Ole Miss (5–0)	Ole Miss (6–1)	San Diego State (6–2)	San Diego State (7–2)	Arkansas (10–2)	Arkansas (10–2)	Ole Miss (12–2)	Georgia (14–2)	West Virginia (13–4)	Ole Miss (15–5)	Illinois (15–7)	Clemson (19–5)	Kansas (17–8)	Saint Mary's (25–4)	BYU (21–8)	Oregon (23–8)	Missouri (22–11)	Gonzaga (26–9)	23.
24.	Ole Miss	Rutgers (2–0)	Rutgers (3–0)	Arizona (2–2)	San Diego State (4–2)	UCLA (8–1)	Michigan (8–2)	Illinois (8–3)	Ole Miss (11–2)	Michigan (11–3)	Wisconsin (13–3)	Memphis (14–4)	Vanderbilt (16–4)	Michigan (16–5)	Creighton (18–6)	Ole Miss (19–7)	Mississippi State (19–8)	Arizona (19–10)	Illinois (20–11)	Gonzaga (25–8)	Saint Mary's (29–6)	24.
25.	Rutgers	Ole Miss (2–0)	Illinois (3–0)	Mississippi State (5–0)	UConn (5–3)	Mississippi State (8–1)	Clemson (9–2)	Baylor (7–3)	Baylor (8–3)	Utah State (14–1)	Baylor (11–4)	Louisville (14–5)	UConn (14–6)	Ole Miss (16–6)	Maryland (18–6)	Louisville (20–6)	BYU (19–8)	Mississippi State (20–9)	Marquette (22–9)	Oregon (24–9)	Memphis (29–6)	25.
	Preseason Oct 14	Week 2 Nov 11	Week 3 Nov 18	Week 4 Nov 25	Week 5 Dec 2	Week 6 Dec 9	Week 7 Dec 16	Week 8 Dec 23	Week 9 Dec 30	Week 10 Jan 6	Week 11 Jan 13	Week 12 Jan 20	Week 13 Jan 27	Week 14 Feb 3	Week 15 Feb 10	Week 16 Feb 17	Week 17 Feb 24	Week 18 Mar 3	Week 19 Mar 10	Week 20 Mar 17	Final April 8	
		Dropped: Texas (1–1); UCLA (1–1)	Dropped: Ohio State (2–1); Ole Miss (4–0)	Dropped: St. John's (5–2); Rutgers (4–1); Illinois (4–1)	Dropped: Indiana (5–2); Arkansas (5–2); Creighton (5–3); Xavier (7–1); Arizona (3–4); Mississippi State (6–1)	Dropped: Baylor (5–3); Memphis (7–2); Pittsburgh (8–2); Illinois (6–2); North Carolina (5–4)	Dropped: Wisconsin (9–3); Mississippi State (9–1)	Dropped: Memphis (9–3); Dayton (10–3); Michigan (9–3); Clemson (10–3)	Dropped: San Diego State (8–3)	Dropped: Cincinnati (10–3); Arkansas (11–3); Baylor (9–4)	Dropped: Oklahoma (13–3); West Virginia (12–3); UCLA (11–5)	Dropped: Gonzaga (14–6); Utah State (16–2); Georgia (14–4); Baylor (11–6)	Dropped: Michigan (14–5); West Virginia (13–6)	Dropped: Oregon (16–6); Louisville (16–6); Vanderbilt (16–5)	Dropped: UConn (16–7); Illinois (16–8)	Dropped: Creighton (18–8)	Dropped: Kansas (18–9); Ole Miss (19–8)	None	Dropped: Arizona (20–11); Mississippi State (20–11)	Dropped: Illinois (21–12); Marquette (23–10)	Dropped: Missouri (22–12); Oregon (25–10)	

== USA Today Coaches Poll ==
	Preseason Oct 23	Week 2 Nov 11	Week 3 Nov 18	Week 4 Nov 25	Week 5 Dec 2	Week 6 Dec 9	Week 7 Dec 16	Week 8 Dec 23	Week 9 Dec 30	Week 10 Jan 6	Week 11 Jan 13	Week 12 Jan 20	Week 13 Jan 27	Week 14 Feb 3	Week 15 Feb 10	Week 16 Feb 17	Week 17 Feb 24	Week 18 Mar 3	Week 19 Mar 10	Week 20 Mar 16	Final April 8	
1.	Kansas (15)	Kansas (2–0)	Kansas (4–0) (21)	Kansas (5–0) (25)	Kansas (7–0) (19)	Tennessee (8–0) (25)	Tennessee (10–0) (22)	Tennessee (11–0) (20)	Tennessee (12–0) (20)	Tennessee (14–0) (21)	Auburn (15–1) (25)	Auburn (17–1) (30)	Auburn (18–1) (30)	Auburn (20–1) (29)	Alabama (20–3) (15)	Auburn (23–2) (31)	Auburn (25–2) (28)	Auburn (27–2) (30)	Duke (28–3) (26)	Duke (31–3) (25)	Florida (36–4) (31)	1.
2.	Alabama (6)	Alabama (2–0)	UConn (3–0) (3)	UConn (4–0) (2)	Auburn (7–0) (12)	Auburn (8–1) (5)	Auburn (9–1) (9)	Auburn (11–1) (11)	Auburn (11–1) (11)	Auburn (13–1) (10)	Iowa State (14–1) (5)	Duke (16–2)	Duke (17–2)	Duke (19–2) (2)	Auburn (21–2) (16)	Florida (22–3)	Duke (24–3) (2)	Duke (26–3) (2)	Houston (27–4) (2)	Houston (30–4) (2)	Houston (35–5)	2.
3.	UConn (6)	UConn (2–0)	Auburn (3–0) (2)	Auburn (4–0) (3)	Tennessee (7–0)	Iowa State (7–1)	Iowa State (9–1)	Iowa State (10–1)	Iowa State (10–1)	Iowa State (12–1)	Duke (14–2)	Alabama (15–3)	Iowa State (17–2)	Alabama (19–3)	Florida (20–3)	Duke (22–3)	Florida (24–3)	Houston (25–4)	Auburn (27–4) (2)	Florida (30–4) (3)	Duke (35–4)	3.
4.	Houston (4)	Auburn (2–0)	Gonzaga (3–0) (1)	Gonzaga (5–0) (1)	Marquette (8–0)	Marquette (9–1)	Kentucky (10–1)	Duke (10–2)	Duke (10–2)	Duke (12–2)	Florida (15–1)	Iowa State (15–2) (1)	Alabama (17–3)	Tennessee (18–4)	Tennessee (20–4)	Alabama (21–4)	Houston (23–4)	Tennessee (24–5)	Florida (27–4) (1)	Auburn (28–5) (1)	Auburn (32–6)	4.
5.	Duke	Gonzaga (2–0)	Iowa State (2–0)	Iowa State (3–0)	Iowa State (5–1)	Kentucky (8–1)	Duke (8–2)	Florida (12–0)	Florida (13–0)	Alabama (12–2)	Alabama (14–2)	Houston (14–3)	Houston (16–3)	Houston (17–4)	Duke (20–3)	Houston (21–4)	Tennessee (22–5)	Florida (25–4)	St. John's (27–4)	St. John's (30–4)	Tennessee (30–8)	5.
6.	Iowa State	Duke (2–0)	Purdue (4–0)	Tennessee (6–0)	Kentucky (7–0)	Duke (7–2)	Florida (10–0)	Alabama (10–2)	Alabama (11–2)	Marquette (13–2)	Tennessee (15–1) (1)	Florida (16–2)	Florida (18–2)	Florida (18–3)	Houston (19–4)	Tennessee (21–5)	Alabama (22–5)	St. John's (26–4)	Tennessee (25–6)т	Tennessee (27–7)	Alabama (28–9)	6.
7.	Gonzaga	Iowa State (1–0)	Alabama (3–1)	Houston (3–1)	Purdue (7–1)	Florida (9–0)	Alabama (8–2)	Kansas (9–2)	Kansas (9–2)	Kentucky (12–2)	Marquette (14–2)	Tennessee (16–2)	Michigan State (17–2)	Purdue (17–5)	Purdue (19–5)	Texas A&M (20–5)	St. John's (24–4)	Michigan State (24–5)	Michigan State (26–5)т	Michigan State (27–6)	Michigan State (30–7)	7.
8.	Baylor	Arizona (2–0)	Houston (2–1)	Kentucky (5–0)	Gonzaga (7–1)	Alabama (7–2)	Kansas (8–2)	Marquette (11–2)	Marquette (11–2)	Florida (13–1)	Houston (12–3)	Michigan State (16–2)	Tennessee (17–3)	Iowa State (17–4)	St. John's (21–3)	Iowa State (20–5)	Michigan State (22–5)	Alabama (23–6)	Alabama (24–7)	Alabama (25–8)	Texas Tech (28–9)	8.
9.	Arizona	Tennessee (2–0)	Tennessee (4–0)	Alabama (4–1)	Duke (5–2)	Gonzaga (7–2)	Marquette (9–2)	Oregon (11–1)	Oregon (12–1)	Texas A&M (12–2)	Kentucky (13–3)	Kentucky (14–4)	Marquette (17–3)	Michigan State (18–3)	Texas A&M (18–5)	St. John's (22–4)	Iowa State (21–6)	Texas Tech (22–7)	Texas Tech (24–7)	Texas Tech (25–8)	Maryland (27–9)	9.
10.	North Carolina	Houston (1–1)	Duke (3–1)	Duke (4–1)	Oregon (8–0)	Kansas (7–2)	Oregon (10–1)	Kentucky (10–2)	Oklahoma (13–0)	UConn (12–3)	Kansas (12–3)	Marquette (15–4)	Purdue (16–5)	St. John's (19–3)	Iowa State (18–5)	Texas Tech (20–5)	Texas Tech (21–6)	Iowa State (22–7)	Clemson (26–5)	Wisconsin (26–9)	St. John's (31–5)	10.
11.	Auburn	North Carolina (1–1)	Kentucky (3–0)	Marquette (4–1)	Wisconsin (8–0)	Purdue (8–2)	Texas A&M (9–2)	Oklahoma (11–0)	Kentucky (10–2)	Houston (10–3)	Texas A&M (13–3)	Kansas (13–4)	Kansas (14–5)	Marquette (18–4)	Michigan State (19–4)	Wisconsin (20–5)	Texas A&M (20–7)	Clemson (24–5)	Maryland (24–7)	Louisville (27–7)	Michigan (27–10)	11.
12.	Tennessee	Purdue (2–0)	North Carolina (2–1)	Purdue (5–1)	Alabama (6–2)	Oregon (9–1)	Houston (6–3)	Houston (8–3)	Texas A&M (11–2)	Kansas (10–3)	Michigan State (14–2)	Purdue (15–4)	Kentucky (14–5)	Texas Tech (17–4)	Texas Tech (18–5)	Michigan (20–5)	Wisconsin (21–6)	Wisconsin (22–7)	Iowa State (23–8)	Maryland (25–8)	Purdue (24–12)	12.
13.	Purdue	Creighton (2–0)	Creighton (4–0)	North Carolina (3–1)	Florida (8–0)	Houston (5–3)	UConn (8–3)	Texas A&M (10–2)	UConn (10–3)	Mississippi State (13–1)	UConn (13–4)	Texas A&M (14–4)	Mississippi State (16–4)	Texas A&M (17–5)	Arizona (17–6)	Michigan State (20–5)	Michigan (20–6)	Louisville (23–6)	Louisville (25–6)	Clemson (27–6)	Arizona (24–13)	13.
14.	Creighton	Baylor (1–1)	Marquette (4–0)	Cincinnati (5–0)	Cincinnati (6–0)	Michigan (8–1)	Gonzaga (7–3)	UConn (10–3)	Houston (8–3)	Michigan State (12–2)	Oregon (15–2)	Mississippi State (15–3)	St. John's (17–3)	Kentucky (15–6)	Memphis (20–4)	Purdue (19–7)	Clemson (22–5)	Maryland (22–7)	Wisconsin (23–8)	Iowa State (24–9)	Kentucky (24–12)	14.
15.	Texas A&M	Marquette (2–0)	Baylor (3–1)	Indiana (4–0)	Memphis (6–1)	Ole Miss (8–1)	Oklahoma (10–0)	Gonzaga (9–3)	Michigan State (10–2)	Illinois (11–3)	Purdue (13–4)	Oregon (15–3)	Texas A&M (15–5)	Memphis (18–4)	Wisconsin (19–5)	Marquette (19–6)	Maryland (21–6)	Michigan (22–7)	Saint Mary's (27–4)	Michigan (25–9)	BYU (26–10)	15.
16.	Arkansas	Indiana (2–0)	Cincinnati (3–0)	Florida (6–0)	Baylor (5–2)	Clemson (9–1)	Ole Miss (9–1)	Ole Miss (11–1)	Mississippi State (11–1)	Oklahoma (13–1)	Gonzaga (14–4)	Ole Miss (15–3)	Memphis (16–4)	Missouri (17–4)	Marquette (18–6)	Missouri (19–6)	Missouri (20–7)	Memphis (24–5)	Texas A&M (22–9)	Memphis (29–5)	Wisconsin (27–10)	16.
17.	Marquette	Cincinnati (2–0)	Arizona (3–1)	Wisconsin (7–0)	Illinois (6–1)	Oklahoma (9–0)	Purdue (8–3)	Cincinnati (10–1)	Cincinnati (10–1)	Oregon (13–2)	Memphis (13–3)	Illinois (13–5)	Wisconsin (16–4)	Kansas (15–6)	Michigan (18–5)	Clemson (21–5)	Louisville (21–6)	Saint Mary's (27–4)	Memphis (26–5)	BYU (24–9)	Iowa State (25–10)	17.
18.	Indiana	Kentucky (2–0)	Indiana (3–0)	Baylor (4–2)	Houston (4–3)	Texas A&M (8–2)	UCLA (9–1)	Michigan State (10–2)	UCLA (11–2)	Gonzaga (12–4)	Mississippi State (14–2)	UConn (13–5)	Oregon (16–4)	UConn (16–6)	Kentucky (16–7)	Arizona (17–8)	Memphis (22–5)	Purdue (20–9)	BYU (23–8)	Texas A&M (22–10)	Ole Miss (24–12)	18.
19.	Texas	Florida (2–0)	Florida (4–0)	Creighton (4–1)	Pittsburgh (7–1)	Michigan State (8–2)	Michigan State (8–2)	Mississippi State (11–1)	Gonzaga (9–4)	Purdue (11–4)	Michigan (13–3)	Wisconsin (15–3)	Texas Tech (15–4)	Wisconsin (17–5)	Clemson (19–5)	Memphis (21–5)	Purdue (19–9)	Missouri (21–8)	Kentucky (21–10)	Saint Mary's (28–5)	Texas A&M (23–11)	19.
20.	Cincinnati	Illinois (2–0)	Illinois (3–0)	Texas A&M (4–1)	Ole Miss (6–1)	UConn (7–3)	Cincinnati (8–1)	San Diego State (8–2)	Illinois (9–3)	Memphis (12–3)	Illinois (12–4)	Michigan (14–4)	Illinois (14–6)	Arizona (15–6)	Kansas (16–7)	Maryland (20–6)	Saint Mary's (25–4)	Marquette (22–7)	Purdue (21–10)	Arizona (22–12)	Gonzaga (26–9)	20.
21.	Florida	Arkansas (1–1)	St. John's (4–0)	Arkansas (4–1)	Oklahoma (7–0)	UCLA (8–1)	Michigan (8–2)	UCLA (10–2)	Baylor (8–3)	UCLA (11–3)	Ole Miss (14–2)	St. John's (16–3)	Missouri (16–4)	Clemson (18–4)	Creighton (18–6)	Kentucky (17–8)	Arizona (18–9)	Texas A&M (20–9)	Michigan (22–9)	Kentucky (22–11)	Louisville (27–8)	21.
22.	UCLA	Ohio State (1–0)	Texas Tech (3–0)	Xavier (5–0)	North Carolina (4–3)	Wisconsin (8–2)	Memphis (8–2)	Illinois (8–3)	Purdue (9–4)	Ole Miss (12–2)	Utah State (16–1)	Memphis (14–4)	Louisville (15–5)	Michigan (16–5)	Missouri (17–6)	Louisville (20–6)	Marquette (20–7)	BYU (21–8)	Missouri (21–10)	Purdue (22–11)	Saint Mary's (29–6)	22.
23.	Kentucky	Texas A&M (1–1)	Texas A&M (3–1)	Arizona (2–2)	Michigan (6–1)	Cincinnati (7–1)	San Diego State (7–2)	Baylor (7–3)	Ole Miss (11–2)	West Virginia (11–2)	Georgia (14–2)	West Virginia (13–4)	Ole Miss (15–5)	Saint Mary's (20–3)	Ole Miss (18–6)	Mississippi State (18–7)	Kentucky (18–9)	Arizona (19–10)	Marquette (22–9)	Gonzaga (25–8)	Clemson (27–7)	23.
24.	Illinois	Rutgers (1–0)	Arkansas (2–1)	Ole Miss (5–0)	Texas A&M (6–2)	San Diego State (6–2)	Dayton (9–2)	St. John's (10–2)	Maryland (11–2)	Michigan (11–3)	Baylor (11–4)	Missouri (15–3)	UConn (14–6)	Maryland (17–5)	UConn (16–7)	Saint Mary's (23–4)	Mississippi State (19–8)	Kentucky (19–10)	Arizona (20–11)	Missouri (22–11)	Creighton (25–11)	24.
25.	Ole Miss	St. John's (2–0)	Wisconsin (4–0)	Pittsburgh (6–1)	Michigan State (6–2)	Baylor (5–3)	Mississippi State (9–1)	Purdue (8–4)	Memphis (10–3)	Utah State (14–1)	West Virginia (12–3)	Texas Tech (13–4)	Clemson (17–4)	Illinois (15–7)	Maryland (18–6)	Kansas (17–8)	Creighton (19–8)	VCU (24–5)	Illinois (20–11)	Marquette (23–10)	Arkansas (22–14)	25.
	Preseason Oct 23	Week 2 Nov 11	Week 3 Nov 18	Week 4 Nov 25	Week 5 Dec 2	Week 6 Dec 9	Week 7 Dec 16	Week 8 Dec 23	Week 9 Dec 30	Week 10 Jan 6	Week 11 Jan 13	Week 12 Jan 20	Week 13 Jan 27	Week 14 Feb 3	Week 15 Feb 10	Week 16 Feb 17	Week 17 Feb 24	Week 18 Mar 3	Week 19 Mar 10	Week 20 Mar 16	Final April 8	
		Dropped: Texas (1–1); UCLA (1–1); Ole Miss (2–0)	Dropped: Ohio State (2–1); Rutgers (3–0)	Dropped: Illinois (4–1); St. John's (5–2); Texas Tech (5–1)	Dropped: UConn (5–3); Indiana (5–2); Creighton (5–3); Arkansas (5–2); Xavier (7–1); Arizona (3–4)	Dropped: Memphis (7–2); Illinois (6–2); Pittsburgh (8–2); North Carolina (5–4)	Dropped: Clemson (9–2); Wisconsin (9–3); Baylor (7–3)	Dropped: Michigan (9–3); Memphis (9–3); Dayton (10–3)	Dropped: San Diego State (8–3); St. John's (11–2)	Dropped: Cincinnati (11–2); Baylor (9–4); Maryland (11–4)	Dropped: Oklahoma (13–3); UCLA (11–5)	Dropped: Gonzaga (12–6); Utah State (16–2); Georgia (14–4); Baylor (11–6)	Dropped: Michigan (14–5); West Virginia (13–6)	Dropped: Mississippi State (16–6); Oregon (16–6); Louisville (16–6); Ole Miss (16–6)	Dropped: Saint Mary's (21–4); Illinois (16–8)	Dropped: Creighton (18–8); Ole Miss (19–7); UConn (17–8)	Dropped: Kansas (18–9)	Dropped: Mississippi State (20–9); Creighton (20–9)	Dropped: VCU (25–6)	Dropped: Illinois (21–12)	Dropped: Memphis (29–6); Missouri (22–12); Marquette (23–11)	

== See also ==
- 2024–25 NCAA Division I women's basketball rankings
