= ASUN men's basketball tournament =

American college basketball tournament

- Conference basketball championship
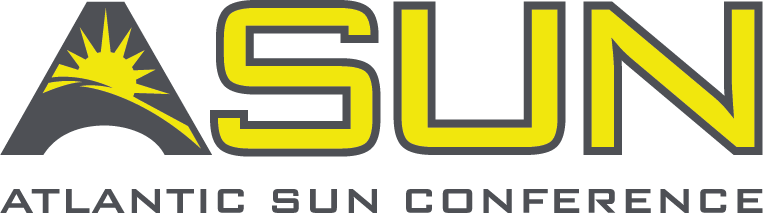
- Sport: Basketball
- Conference: Atlantic Sun Conference (2002–present); Trans America Athletic Conference (1979–2001)
- Number of teams: 10
- Format: Single-elimination tournament
- Current stadium: campus sites
- Current location: campus sites
- Played: 1979–present
- Last contest: 2026
- Current champion: Queens Royals (1)
- Most championships: Belmont Bruins (5)
- TV partner: ESPN
- Official website: ASUN men's basketball

The ASUN Conference men's basketball tournament (formerly known as the Trans America Athletic Conference men's basketball tournament between 1979 and 2001) is the conference championship tournament in basketball for the Atlantic Sun Conference, formerly known as the Trans America Athletic Conference (TAAC) and Atlantic Sun Conference. The tournament has been held every year since 1979, except for 1992–93.

It is a single-elimination tournament and seeding is based on regular season records. Since 1981 (after a two-year qualification period for the conference), the winner, declared conference champion, receives the conference's automatic bid to the NCAA men's basketball tournament, as long as it is eligible for NCAA-sponsored postseason play. The eligibility issue applied in both 2021 and 2022, with each final featuring a team representing a transitional member of Division I (North Alabama in 2021 and Bellarmine in 2022). Under NCAA rules, a school transitioning from NCAA Division II is not eligible for NCAA-sponsored D-I postseason play (either the NCAA tournament or the NIT) during its four-year transitional period. North Alabama began its transition in July 2018 and was thus ineligible for the NCAA tournament or NIT through the 2021–22 season; Bellarmine began its transition in July 2020 and is thus ineligible for said events through 2023–24. Should a transitional school win the tournament, ASUN rules call for the regular-season champion to receive the automatic bid. North Alabama lost its final, making the issue moot for 2021, but Bellarmine won in 2022, giving Jacksonville State that season's automatic bid.

== History ==
=== Trans America Athletic Conference ===
| Year | Champion | Score | Runner-up | Tournament MVP | Location |
|---|---|---|---|---|---|
| 1979 | Northeast Louisiana | 90–69 | Mercer | Calvin Natt, Northeast Louisiana | Fant–Ewing Coliseum • Monroe, Louisiana |
| 1980 | Centenary | 79–77 | Northeast Louisiana | George Lett, Centenary | Fant–Ewing Coliseum • Monroe, Louisiana |
| 1981 | Mercer | 72–67 | Houston Baptist | Tony Gattis, Mercer | Hirsch Coliseum • Shreveport, Louisiana |
| 1982 | Northeast Louisiana | 98–85 | Centenary | Donald Wilson, Northeast Louisiana | Fant–Ewing Coliseum • Monroe, Louisiana |
| 1983 | Georgia Southern | 68–67 | Arkansas–Little Rock | Jim Lampley, UALR | Barton Coliseum • Little Rock, Arkansas |
| 1984 | Houston Baptist | 81–76 | Samford | Craig Beard, Samford | Spring Branch Coliseum • Houston, Texas |
| 1985 | Mercer | 105–96 | Arkansas–Little Rock | Sam Mitchell, Mercer | Hanner Fieldhouse • Statesboro, Georgia |
| 1986 | Arkansas–Little Rock | 85–63 | Centenary | Michael Clarke, UALR | Barton Coliseum • Little Rock, Arkansas |
| 1987 | Georgia Southern | 49–46 | Stetson | Jeff Sanders, Georgia Southern | Barton Coliseum • Little Rock, Arkansas |
| 1988 | Texas–San Antonio | 76–69 | Georgia Southern | Frank Hampton, UTSA | Ocean Center • Daytona Beach, Florida |
| 1989 | Arkansas–Little Rock | 100–72 | Centenary | Jeff Cummings, UALR | Barton Coliseum • Little Rock, Arkansas |
| 1990 | Arkansas–Little Rock | 105–95 | Centenary | Derrick Owens, UALR | Barton Coliseum • Little Rock, Arkansas |
| 1991 | Georgia State | 80–60 | Arkansas–Little Rock | Chris Collier, Georgia State | Edmunds Center • DeLand, Florida |
| 1992 | Georgia Southern | 95–82 | Georgia State | Charlton Young, Georgia Southern | Hanner Fieldhouse • Statesboro, Georgia |
| 1993 | No tournament | | | | |
| 1994 | Central Florida | 70–67 | Stetson | Victor Saxton, UCF | UCF Arena • Orlando, Florida |
| 1995 | Florida International | 68–57 | Mercer | James Mazyck, FIU | UCF Arena • Orlando, Florida |
| 1996 | Central Florida | 86–77 | Mercer | Harry Kennedy, UCF | Edmunds Center • DeLand, Florida |
| 1997 | College of Charleston | 83–73 | Florida International | Anthony Johnson, C of C | John Kresse Arena • Charleston, South Carolina |
| 1998 | College of Charleston | 72–63 | Florida International | Sedric Webber, C of C | John Kresse Arena • Charleston, South Carolina |
| 1999 | Samford | 89–61 | Central Florida | Marc Salyers, Samford | Jacksonville Coliseum • Jacksonville, Florida |
| 2000 | Samford | 81–68 | Central Florida | Marc Salyers, Samford | Jacksonville Coliseum • Jacksonville, Florida |
| 2001 | Georgia State | 79–55 | Troy State | Thomas Terrell, Georgia State | GSU Sports Arena • Atlanta, Georgia |

=== Atlantic Sun/ASUN Conference ===
| Year | Champion | Score | Runner-up | Tournament MVP | Location |
|---|---|---|---|---|---|
| 2002 | Florida Atlantic | 76–75 | Georgia State | Thomas Terrell, Georgia State | UCF Arena • Orlando, Florida |
| 2003 | Troy State | 80–59 | Central Florida | Ben Fletcher, Troy | GSU Sports Arena • Atlanta |
| 2004 | Central Florida | 60–55 | Troy State | Dexter Lyons, UCF | Curb Event Center • Nashville, Tennessee |
| 2005 | Central Florida | 63–54 | Gardner–Webb | Gary Johnson, UCF | Curb Event Center • Nashville, Tennessee |
| 2006 | Belmont | 74–69^{OT} | Lipscomb | Justin Hare, Belmont | Memorial Center • Johnson City, Tennessee |
| 2007 | Belmont | 94–67 | East Tennessee State | Justin Hare, Belmont | Memorial Center • Johnson City, Tennessee |
| 2008 | Belmont | 79–61 | Jacksonville | Shane Dansby, Belmont | Allen Arena • Nashville, Tennessee |
| 2009 | East Tennessee State | 85–68 | Jacksonville | Kevin Tiggs, ETSU | Allen Arena • Nashville, Tennessee |
| 2010 | East Tennessee State | 72–66 | Mercer | Micah Williams, ETSU | University Center • Macon, Georgia |
| 2011 | Belmont | 87–46 | North Florida | Mick Hedgepeth, Belmont | University Center • Macon, Georgia |
| 2012 | Belmont | 83–69 | Florida Gulf Coast | Kerron Johnson, Belmont | University Center • Macon, Georgia |
| 2013 | Florida Gulf Coast | 88–75 | Mercer | Brett Comer, FGCU | University Center • Macon, Georgia |
| 2014 | Mercer | 68–60 | Florida Gulf Coast | Langston Hall, Mercer | Alico Arena • Fort Myers, Florida |
| 2015 | North Florida | 63–57 | USC Upstate | Demarcus Daniels, North Florida | UNF Arena • Jacksonville, Florida |
| 2016 | Florida Gulf Coast | 80–78^{OT} | Stetson | Marc-Eddy Norelia, FGCU | Alico Arena • Fort Myers, Florida |
| 2017 | Florida Gulf Coast | 77–61 | North Florida | Brandon Goodwin, FGCU | Alico Arena • Fort Myers, Florida |
| 2018 | Lipscomb | 108–96 | Florida Gulf Coast | Garrison Mathews, Lipscomb | Alico Arena • Fort Myers, Florida |
| 2019 | Liberty | 74–68 | Lipscomb | Scottie James, Liberty | Allen Arena • Nashville, Tennessee |
| 2020 | Liberty | 73–57 | Lipscomb | Caleb Homesley, Liberty | Vines Center • Lynchburg, Virginia |
| 2021 | Liberty | 79–75 | North Alabama | Darius McGhee, Liberty | UNF Arena • Jacksonville, Florida |
| 2022 | Bellarmine | 77–72 | Jacksonville | Dylan Penn, Bellarmine | Freedom Hall • Louisville, Kentucky |
| 2023 | Kennesaw State | 67–66 | Liberty | Terrell Burden, Kennesaw State | KSU Convocation Center • Kennesaw, Georgia |
| 2024 | Stetson | 94–91 | Austin Peay | Jalen Blackmon, Stetson | Edmunds Center • DeLand, Florida |
| 2025 | Lipscomb | 76–65 | North Alabama | Joe Anderson, Lipscomb | Allen Arena • Nashville, Tennessee |
| 2026 | Queens | 98–93^{OT} | Central Arkansas | Nasir Mann, Queens | VyStar Veterans Memorial Arena • Jacksonville, Florida |

== Broadcasters ==
| Year | Network | Play-by-play | Analyst |
|---|---|---|---|
| 2024 | ESPN2 | Mike Corey | Richard Hendrix |
| 2023 | ESPN2 | Mike Corey | Tim McCormick |
| 2022 | ESPN2 | Mike Corey | Bob Valvano |
| 2021 | ESPN | Anish Shroff | Jon Sundvold |
| 2020 | ESPN | Mike Corey | Jon Crispin |
| 2019 | ESPN | Anish Shroff | Cory Alexander |
| 2018 | ESPN | Anish Shroff | Cory Alexander |
| 2017 | ESPN2 | Kevin Brown | Cory Alexander |
| 2016 | ESPN2 | Tom Hart | Cory Alexander |
| 2015 | ESPN2 | Tom Hart | Cory Alexander |
| 2014 | ESPN2 | Jason Benetti | Cory Alexander |
| 2013 | ESPN2 | Roy Philpott | Dereck Whittenburg |
| 2012 | ESPN2 | Adam Amin | Bob Valvano |
| 2011 | ESPN2 | Mark Jones | Bob Valvano |
| 2010 | ESPN2 | Rob Stone | Tim McCormick |
| 2009 | ESPN | Eric Collins | Bob Valvano |
| 2008 | | | |
| 2007 | ESPN2 | Jon Sciambi | Bucky Waters |
| 2006 | ESPN | Lou Canellis | Bucky Waters |
| 1998 | ESPN | Dewayne Staats | Len Elmore |

== Performance by school ==
| School | Championships | Championship Years |
|---|---|---|
| Belmont (Note: No longer a conference member.) | 5 | 2006, 2007, 2008, 2011, 2012 |
| UCF | 4 | 1994, 1996, 2004, 2005 |
| Liberty | 3 | 2019, 2020, 2021 |
| **Florida Gulf Coast** | 3 | 2013, 2016, 2017 |
| Mercer | 3 | 1981, 1985, 2014 |
| Georgia Southern | 3 | 1983, 1987, 1992 |
| Arkansas-Little Rock (Note: Branded athletically as Little Rock since the 2015–16 school year.) | 3 | 1986, 1989, 1990 |
| **Lipscomb** | 2 | 2018, 2025 |
| East Tennessee State | 2 | 2009, 2010 |
| Georgia State | 2 | 1991, 2001 |
| Samford | 2 | 1999, 2000 |
| College of Charleston (Note: Now athletically branded as Charleston.) | 2 | 1997, 1998 |
| Northeast Louisiana (Note: Known since 1999 as Louisiana–Monroe (in full, the University of Louisiana at Monroe). For athletic branding purposes, the school typically uses "ULM", but accepts "Louisiana–Monroe".) | 2 | 1979, 1982 |
| **Queens** | 1 | 2026 |
| **Stetson** | 1 | 2024 |
| Kennesaw State | 1 | 2023 |
| **Bellarmine** | 1 | 2022 |
| **North Florida** | 1 | 2015 |
| Troy | 1 | 2003 |
| Florida Atlantic | 1 | 2002 |
| Florida International (Note: Now athletically branded as FIU.) | 1 | 1995 |
| UTSA | 1 | 1988 |
| Houston Baptist (Note: Known as Houston Christian since September 21, 2022.) | 1 | 1984 |
| Centenary | 1 | 1980 |
| TOTAL | 47 | |

Teams in bold are ASUN members as of the upcoming 2024–25 NCAA basketball season.

- Among other current ASUN members:
  - Austin Peay, Jacksonville and North Alabama have advanced to the tournament final but have yet to win a championship.
  - Eastern Kentucky and West Georgia have yet to advance to the tournament final.

== NCAA Tournament appearances ==
| Year | TAAC/ASUN Team | Opponent | Result |
|---|---|---|---|
| 1981 | (12) Mercer | (5) Arkansas | L 67–73 |
| 1982 | (11) Northeast Louisiana | (6) Iowa | L 63–70 |
| 1983 | (12) Georgia Southern | (12) Robert Morris | L 54–64 |
| 1984 | (12) Houston Baptist | (12) Alcorn State | L 60–79 |
| 1985 | (15) Mercer | (2) Georgia Tech | L 58–65 |
| 1986 | (14) Arkansas–Little Rock | (3) Notre Dame (6) NC State | W 90–83; L 66–80^{2OT} |
| 1987 | (15) Georgia Southern | (2) Syracuse | L 73–79 |
| 1988 | (14) UTSA | (3) Illinois | L 72–81 |
| 1989 | (13) Arkansas–Little Rock | (4) Louisville | L 71–76 |
| 1990 | (16) Little Rock | (1) UNLV | L 72–102 |
| 1991 | (16) Georgia State | (1) Arkansas | L 76–117 |
| 1992 | (15) Georgia Southern | (2) Oklahoma State | L 73–100 |
| 1993 | No conference tournament | | |
| 1994 | (12) College of Charleston | (5) Wake Forest | L 58–68 |
| 1994 | (16) UCF | (1) Purdue | L 67–98 |
| 1995 | (16) FIU | (1) UCLA | L 56–92 |
| 1996 | (16) UCF | (1) UMass | L 70–92 |
| 1997 | (12) College of Charleston | (5) Maryland (4) Arizona | W 75–66; L 69–73 |
| 1998 | (14) College of Charleston | (3) Stanford | L 57–67 |
| 1999 | (14) Samford | (3) St. John's | L 43–69 |
| 2000 | (13) Samford | (4) Syracuse | L 65–79 |
| 2001 | (11) Georgia State | (6) Wisconsin (3) Maryland | W 50–49; L 60–79 |
| 2002 | (15) Florida Atlantic | (2) Alabama | L 78–86 |
| 2003 | (14) Troy State | (3) Xavier | L 59–71 |
| 2004 | (14) UCF | (3) Pittsburgh | L 44–53 |
| 2005 | (15) UCF | (2) Connecticut | L 71–77 |
| 2006 | (15) Belmont | (2) UCLA | L 44–78 |
| 2007 | (15) Belmont | (2) Georgetown | L 55–80 |
| 2008 | (15) Belmont | (2) Duke | L 70–71 |
| 2009 | (16) East Tennessee State | (1) Pittsburgh | L 62–72 |
| 2010 | (16) East Tennessee State | (1) Kentucky | L 71–100 |
| 2011 | (13) Belmont | (4) Wisconsin | L 58–72 |
| 2012 | (14) Belmont | (3) Georgetown | L 59–74 |
| 2013 | (15) Florida Gulf Coast | (2) Georgetown (7) San Diego State (3) Florida | W 78–68; W 81–71; L 50–62 |
| 2014 | (14) Mercer | (3) Duke (11) Tennessee | W 78–71; L 63–83 |
| 2015 | (16) North Florida | (16) Robert Morris | L 77–81 |
| 2016 | (16) Florida Gulf Coast | (16) Fairleigh Dickinson (1) North Carolina | W 96–65; L 67–83 |
| 2017 | (14) Florida Gulf Coast | (3) Florida State | L 80–86 |
| 2018 | (15) Lipscomb | (2) North Carolina | L 66–84 |
| 2019 | (12) Liberty | (5) Mississippi State (4) Virginia Tech | W 80–76; L 58–67 |
| 2021 | (13) Liberty | (4) Oklahoma State | L 60–69 |
| 2022 | (15) Jacksonville State | (2) Auburn | L 61–80 |
| 2023 | (14) Kennesaw State | (3) Xavier | L 67–72 |
| 2024 | (16) Stetson | (1) UConn | L 52–91 |
| 2025 | (14) Lipscomb | (3) Iowa State | L 55–82 |
| 2026 | (15) Queens | (2) Purdue | L 71–104 |

- 2020 NCAA tournament was canceled due to COVID-19.

== See also ==
- ASUN women's basketball tournament
