= Houston Christian Huskies men's basketball statistical leaders =

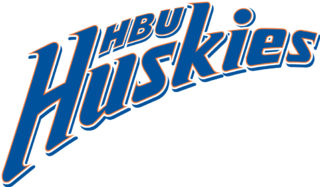

The Houston Christian Huskies men's basketball statistical leaders are individual statistical leaders of the Houston Christian Huskies men's basketball program in various categories, including points, rebounds, assists, steals, and blocks. Within those areas, the lists identify single-game, single-season, and career leaders. The Huskies represent Houston Christian University, previously known as Houston Baptist College and Houston Baptist University, in the NCAA Division I Southland Conference.

Houston Christian began competing in intercollegiate basketball in 1963. The NCAA did not officially record assists as a stat until the 1983–84 season, and blocks and steals until the 1985–86 season, but Houston's record books includes players in these stats before these seasons. These lists are updated through the end of the 2020–21 season.

== Scoring ==
Career
Rank	Player	Points	Seasons
1	Eddie Brown	1,939	1968–69 1969–70 1970–71 1971–72
2	E.C. Coleman	1,846	1969–70 1970–71 1971–72 1972–73
3	Chad Hartley	1,818	1995–96 1996–97 1997–98 1998–99
4	Shannon Holmes	1,546	1991–92 1992–93 1993–94 1994–95
5	Charles Fordjour	1,511	1999–00 2000–01 2001–02
6	Michael Holmquist	1,494	2000–01 2001–02 2002–03 2003–04
7	Tony DiCamillo	1,493	1991–92 1992–93 1993–94 1994–95
8	Ian DuBose	1,446	2017–18 2018–19 2019–20
9	Kelton Smith	1,434	1996–97 1997–98 1998–99 1999–00
10	Ralton Way	1,374	1977–78 1978–79 1979–80 1980–81

Season
Rank	Player	Points	Season
1	Rod Nealy	984	2002–03
2	Andrew Gonzalez	686	2010–11
3	Kelton Smith	678	1996–97
4	David Preston	670	1994–95
5	Ricky Bennett	627	2004–05
6	David Preston	620	1993–94
7	Andrew Gonzalez	606	2009–10
8	Dwight Jones II	603	2006–07
9	Mike Sissel	599	1995–96
10	Ricky Bennett	596	2003–04

Single game
Rank	Player	Points	Season	Opponent
1	Rod Nealy	52	2002–03	Huston-Tillotson
	Darius Lee	52	2021–22	McNeese
3	Rod Nealy	50	2002–03	Mountain State
4	David Preston	46	1994–95	Huston-Tillotson
5	Ian DuBose	44	2019–20	Central Arkansas
6	Reggie Gibbs	43	1988–89	Texas-San Antonio
	Reggie Gibbs	43	1988–89	Georgia Southern
	Rod Nealy	43	2002–03	Texas A&M-Kingsville
9	Lorenzo Ewing	42	1995–96	Texas Lutheran
10	Eddie Brown	41	1968–69	Bishop
	Mike Sissel	41	1995–96	Schreiner
	Mike Sissel	41	1995–96	Wiley
	Bryson Dawkins	41	2024–25	Stephen F. Austin

== Rebounds ==
Career
Rank	Player	Rebounds	Seasons
1	E.C. Coleman	1,287	1969–70 1970–71 1971–72 1972–73
2	Charles Fordjour	853	1999–00 2000–01 2001–02
3	Shannon Holmes	811	1991–92 1992–93 1993–94 1994–95
4	Anicet Lavodrama	806	1981–82 1982–83 1983–84 1984–85
5	Willie Bennett	786	1970–71 1971–72 1972–73 1973–74
6	Robert Paige	774	1972–73 1973–74 1974–75 1975–76
7	Ralton Way	745	1977–78 1978–79 1979–80 1980–81
8	Mack Coleman	741	1972–73 1973–74 1974–75 1975–76
9	Randy Martell	722	1977–78 1978–79 1979–80 1980–81
10	Tony DiCamillo	701	1991–92 1992–93 1993–94 1994–95

Season
Rank	Player	Rebounds	Season
1	E.C. Coleman	387	1971–72
2	Rod Nealy	373	2002–03
3	Charles Fordjour	357	2000–01
4	Mack Coleman	344	1974–75
5	Chris Miller	335	2004–05
6	Mike Sissel	316	1995–96
7	E.C. Coleman	303	1970–71
8	E.C. Coleman	302	1969–70
9	Vernon Freeman	297	1975–76
	Bruno Kongawoin	297	1986–87

Single game
Rank	Player	Rebounds	Season	Opponent
1	E.C. Coleman	25	1971–72	McNeese State

== Assists ==
Career
Rank	Player	Assists	Seasons
1	Yadorian Parham	623	1997–98 1998–99 1999–00
2	Bobby Sanders	570	1991–92 1992–93 1993–94 1994–95
3	Fred Goporo	568	1983–84 1984–85 1985–86 1986–87
4	Bennie Coleman	530	1993–94 1994–95 1995–96 1997–98
5	Darryl Jones	417	1981–82 1982–83 1983–84
6	Ben Karam	407	1999–00 2000–01 2002–03
7	Braxton Bonds	368	2016–17 2017–18 2018–19
8	Ricky Bennett	349	2003–04 2004–05
9	Kelvin Lee	335	1978–79 1979–80 1980–81 1981–82
10	Chad Hartley	325	1995–96 1996–97 1997–98 1998–99

Season
Rank	Player	Assists	Season
1	Yadorian Parham	259	1997–98
2	Fred Goporo	205	1986–87
	Ricky Bennett	205	2003–04
4	Bobby Sanders	196	1992–93
5	Yadorian Parham	194	1998–99
6	Fred Goporo	186	1985–86
7	Bennie Coleman	180	1995–96
8	Ben Karam	174	2002–03
9	Yadorian Parham	170	1999–00
10	Darryl Jones	165	1982–83

Single game
Rank	Player	Assists	Season	Opponent
1	Darryl Jones	18	1982–83	Mercer

== Steals ==
Career
Rank	Player	Steals	Seasons
1	Chad Hartley	245	1995–96 1996–97 1997–98 1998–99
2	Bennie Coleman	193	1993–94 1994–95 1995–96 1997–98
3	Braxton Bonds	184	2016–17 2017–18 2018–19
4	Larry Hollins	175	1980–81 1981–82 1982–83 1983–84
5	Ben Karam	173	1999–00 2000–01 2002–03
6	Michael Moss	155	2009–10 2010–11
7	Michael Holmquist	152	2000–01 2001–02 2002–03 2003–04
8	Fred Goporo	151	1983–84 1984–85 1985–86 1986–87
9	Bobby Sanders	150	1991–92 1992–93 1993–94 1994–95
10	Ryan Bailey	134	1993–94 1994–95 1995–96 1996–97

Season
Rank	Player	Steals	Season
1	Michael Moss	87	2010–11
2	Ben Karam	84	2000–01
3	Chad Hartley	82	1998–99
4	Ricky Bennett	77	2003–04
5	Michael Moss	74	2009–10
	Matt England	74	1984–85
7	Roy Jones	73	1981–82
8	Mike Smith	67	2001–02
	Braxton Bonds	67	2018–19
10	Fred Goporo	66	1986–87

Single game
Rank	Player	Steals	Season	Opponent
1	Baron Sauls	9	2008–09	Utah Valley

== Blocks ==
Career
Rank	Player	Blocks	Seasons
1	Ralton Way	234	1977–78 1978–79 1979–80 1980–81
2	Matt Autenrieth	178	2003–04 2004–05 2005–06 2006–07
3	Anicet Lavodrama	161	1981–82 1982–83 1983–84 1984–85
4	Josh Ibarra	129	2014–15 2015–16 2016–17 2017–18
5	Craig Cleveland	120	1992–93 1993–94 1994–95 1995–96
6	Gabe Rapier	119	1997–98 1998–99
7	Ben McCain	107	2004–05 2005–06
8	Keith Jordan	83	1985–86 1986–87 1987–88 1988–89
9	Charles Fordjour	68	1999–00 2000–01 2001–02
10	Emanuel Willis	67	2006–07 2007–08 2008–09

Season
Rank	Player	Blocks	Season
1	Ralton Way	85	1977–78
2	Matt Autenrieth	65	2006–07
3	Matt Autenrieth	63	2003–04
4	Gabe Rapier	62	1997–98
5	Isaiah Robinson	58	2015–16
6	Gabe Rapier	57	1998–99
	Ben McCain	57	2005–06
8	Anicet Lavodrama	55	1984–85
	Josh Ibarra	55	2014–15
10	Ralton Way	53	1979–80

Single game
Rank	Player	Blocks	Season	Opponent
1	Craig Cleveland	9	1993–94	Tulsa
	Matt Autenrieth	9	2003–04	Bacone
