= 1985 TAAC men's basketball tournament =

- Classification: Division I
- Season: 1984–85
- Teams: 8
- Site: Hanner Fieldhouse; Statesboro, GA
- Champions: Mercer (2nd title)
- Winning coach: Bill Bibb (2nd title)
- MVP: Sam Mitchell (Mercer)
- TAAC men's basketball tournaments

1984–85 Trans America Athletic Conference men's basketball standings
	Conf.				Overall
Team	W		L	PCT	W		L	PCT
Georgia Southern	11	–	3	.786	24	–	5	.828
Houston Baptist	10	–	4	.714	21	–	8	.724
Mercer †	10	–	4	.714	22	–	9	.710
Arkansas–Little Rock	9	–	5	.643	17	–	13	.567
Samford	7	–	7	.500	18	–	12	.600
Hardin–Simmons	7	–	7	.500	11	–	17	.393
Centenary	2	–	12	.143	7	–	21	.250
Georgia State	0	–	14	.000	2	–	26	.071
† 1985 TAAC tournament winner Rankings from AP Poll

The 1985 Trans America Athletic Conference men's basketball tournament (now known as the ASUN men's basketball tournament) was held March 2–4 at Hanner Fieldhouse in Statesboro, Georgia.

Mercer defeated Arkansas–Little Rock in the championship game, 105–96, to win their second TAAC/Atlantic Sun men's basketball tournament. The Bears, therefore, received an automatic bid to the 1985 NCAA tournament.

Nicholls State and Northwestern State departed the TAAC for the Southland Conference prior to the season, keeping the total membership of the conference at eight. In turn, this was Georgia State's first TAAC tournament.

== Bracket ==
Quarterfinals; Saturday, March 2
1	Georgia Southern	109
8	Georgia State	61
5	Hardin–Simmons	73
4	Arkansas–Little Rock	75
3	Houston Baptist	77
6	Samford	67
7	Centenary	70
2	Mercer	74

Semifinals; Sunday, March 3
1	Georgia Southern	65
4	Arkansas–Little Rock	67
3	Houston Baptist	65
2	Mercer	69

Championship; Monday, March 4
4	Arkansas–Little Rock	96
2	Mercer	105
