= 1981 TAAC men's basketball tournament =

Sports competition in Louisiana, US

- Classification: Division I
- Season: 1980–81
- Teams: 9
- Site: Hirsch Memorial Coliseum; Shreveport, LA
- Champions: Mercer (1st title)
- Winning coach: Bill Bibb (1st title)
- MVP: Tony Gattis (Mercer)
- TAAC men's basketball tournaments

1980–81 Trans America Athletic Conference men's basketball standings
	Conf.				Overall
Team	W		L	PCT	W		L	PCT
Houston Baptist	9	–	3	.750	18	–	10	.643
NE Louisiana	8	–	4	.667	15	–	13	.536
Mercer †	7	–	4	.636	18	–	12	.600
Centenary	7	–	5	.583	16	–	12	.571
Arkansas–Little Rock	5	–	6	.455	13	–	13	.500
Samford	5	–	6	.455	10	–	17	.370
Northwestern State	5	–	7	.417	11	–	17	.393
Hardin-Simmons	4	–	8	.333	9	–	18	.333
Georgia Southern	2	–	9	.182	5	–	22	.185
† 1981 TAAC tournament winner Rankings from AP Poll

The 1981 Trans America Athletic Conference men's basketball tournament (now known as the ASUN men's basketball tournament) was held March 4–8 at the Hirsch Memorial Coliseum in Shreveport, Louisiana. It was the first TAAC tournament after a two-year qualification period for the conference where the winner would receive a bid to the NCAA Tournament.

Mercer upset top-seeded Houston Baptist in the championship game, 72–67, to win their first TAAC/Atlantic Sun men's basketball tournament. The Bears, in turn, received the TAAC's automatic bid to the 1981 NCAA tournament. This was Mercer's first appearance in the Division I NCAA tournament.

== Bracket ==
First round Wednesday, March 4
Samford	73
Georgia Southern	57
Northwestern State	91
Hardin–Simmons	88

Second round Thursday, March 5
Samford	69
Centenary	76
Mercer	78
UALR	69
Northwestern State	73
Northeast Louisiana	79

Semifinals; Friday, March 6
Houston Baptist	48
Centenary	47
Mercer	59
Northeast Louisiana	55

Championship; Sunday, March 8
Houston Baptist	67
Mercer	72
