= 1983–84 Houston Baptist Huskies men's basketball team =

American college basketball season

1983–84 Houston Baptist Huskies men's basketball

TAAC Regular season champions TAAC tournament champions

NCAA tournament
- Conference: Trans America Athletic Conference
- Record: 24–7 (11–3 TAAC)
- Head coach: Gene Iba (7th season)
- Home arena: Sharp Gymnasium (Capacity: 1,000)

1983–84 Trans America Athletic Conference men's basketball standings
	Conf.				Overall
Team	W		L	PCT	W		L	PCT
Houston Baptist †	11	–	3	.786	24	–	7	.774
Samford	10	–	4	.714	22	–	8	.733
Georgia Southern	8	–	6	.571	16	–	12	.571
Arkansas–Little Rock	7	–	7	.500	14	–	15	.483
Centenary	7	–	7	.500	12	–	16	.429
Mercer	6	–	8	.429	14	–	14	.500
Hardin–Simmons	5	–	9	.357	9	–	22	.290
Northwestern State	2	–	12	.143	6	–	22	.214
Nicholls State*	0	–	0	–	19	–	7	.731
† 1984 TAAC tournament winner *Provisional member; played no conference games. Rankings from AP Poll

The 1983–84 Houston Baptist Huskies men's basketball team represented Houston Baptist University in the 1983–84 college basketball season. This was head coach Gene Iba’s seventh of eight seasons at HBU. The Huskies played their home games at the Sharp Gymnasium and were new members of the Trans America Athletic Conference. After finishing atop the conference regular season standings, the Huskies followed that success by winning the TAAC tournament to receive an automatic bid to the 1984 NCAA tournament – the only appearance in program history. Houston Baptist was beaten by Alcorn State in the play-in round to finish the season 24–7, 11–3 in TAAC play. The Huskies led the league in field goal percentage and, as of 2017, the 1983-84 team has the tenth-highest all-time season shooting percentage of an NCAA Division I team. Of the team members, three (Fred Goporo, Bruno Kongaouin, and Anicet Lavodrama) represented the Central African Republic men's national basketball team at the 1988 Summer Olympics.

== Roster ==
1983–84 Houston Baptist Huskies men's basketball team
Players
Coaches

Pos.	#	Name	Height	Weight	Year	Previous school	Hometown
F		Boone Almanza	6 ft 4 in (1.93 m)	—	Jr
G		Scott Bigott	6 ft 2 in (1.88 m)	—	Sr
G		Matt England	6 ft 4 in (1.93 m)	—	Jr
G		Fred Goporo	5 ft 10 in (1.78 m)	160 lb (73 kg)	Fr
F		Terry Hairston	6 ft 4 in (1.93 m)	—	Sr
F		Larry Hollins	6 ft 6 in (1.98 m)	—	Sr
G		Darryl Jones	6 ft 2 in (1.88 m)	—	Sr
F		Bruno Kongaouin	6 ft 8 in (2.03 m)	—	Fr
C		Anicet Lavodrama	6 ft 9 in (2.06 m)	—	Jr
C		Hamilton Lewis	6 ft 7 in (2.01 m)	—	Jr
G		Reggie Martin	6 ft 3 in (1.91 m)	—	Jr
G		Arthur Walton	6 ft 3 in (1.91 m)	—	Fr
C		Ellington Wilkins	6 ft 7 in (2.01 m)	—	So

Head coach

- Gene Iba (Tulsa)

Assistant coach(es)

Legend

- (C) Team captain
- (S) Suspended
- (I) Ineligible
- (W) Walk-on
- Injured
- Current redshirt

== Schedule and results ==
Date time, TV	Rank^{#}	Opponent^{#}	Result	Record	Site (attendance) city, state
Regular Season
Nov 26, 1983*		Texas Wesleyan	W 70–60	1–0	Sharp Gymnasium (1,026); Houston, Texas
Nov 28, 1983*		Oklahoma State	W 75–65	2–0	Sharp Gymnasium (1,428); Houston, Texas
Dec 3, 1983*		LeTourneau	W 101–61	3–0	Sharp Gymnasium (803); Houston, Texas
Dec 9, 1983*		vs. UMass	W 68–55	4–0	Edmunds Center (3,200); DeLand, Florida
Dec 10, 1983*		at Stetson	L 63–71	4–1	Edmunds Center (3,786); DeLand, Florida
Dec 15, 1983*		St. Edward's	W 74–56	5–1	Sharp Gymnasium (1,001); Houston, Texas
Dec 15, 1983*		Concordia	W 85–75	6–1	Sharp Gymnasium (817); Houston, Texas
Dec 19, 1983*		at No. 11 Louisiana State	L 59–60	6–2	LSU Assembly Center (11,713); Baton Rouge, Louisiana
Dec 21, 1983		at Nicholls State	L 50–51	6–3 (0–1)	Stopher Gymnasium (346); Thibodaux, Louisiana
Dec 30, 1983*		at Drake	W 57–53	7–3	Veterans Memorial Auditorium (1,984); Des Moines, Iowa
Jan 2, 1984*		at Louisiana-Monroe	W 69–61	8–3	Fant-Ewing Coliseum (919); Monroe, Louisiana
Jan 5, 1984		Nicholls State	W 63–57	9–3 (1–1)	Sharp Gymnasium (1,850); Houston, Texas
Jan 31, 1984*		Prairie View A&M	W 72–33	15–5	Sharp Gymnasium (831); Houston, Texas
Feb 4, 1984		Hardin-Simmons	W 50–46	16–5 (6–2)	Sharp Gymnasium (1,024); Houston, Texas
Feb 6, 1984		at Arkansas–Little Rock	L 61–66	16–6 (6–3)	Barton Coliseum (500); Little Rock, Arkansas
Feb 9, 1984		Centenary (LA)	W 63–62 ^{OT}	17–6 (7–3)	Sharp Gymnasium (1,009); Houston, Texas
Feb 11, 1984		Northwestern State	W 91–67	18–6 (8–3)	Sharp Gymnasium (1,111); Houston, Texas
Feb 16, 1984		at Samford	W 63–57	19–6 (9–3)	Seibert Hall (3,100); Homewood, Alabama
Feb 25, 1984		Georgia Southern	W 75–52	20–6 (10–3)	Sharp Gymnasium (1,525); Houston, Texas
Feb 27, 1984		Mercer	W 73–57	21–6 (11–3)	Sharp Gymnasium (1,127); Houston, Texas
TAAC Tournament
Mar 8, 1984*		Northwestern State; Quarterfinals	W 71–53	22–6	Sharp Gymnasium (903); Houston, Texas
Mar 9, 1984*		Arkansas–Little Rock; Semifinals	W 76–58	23–6	Spring Branch Coliseum (1,598); Houston, Texas
Mar 10, 1984*		Samford; Championship game	W 81–76	24–6	Spring Branch Coliseum (2,509); Houston, Texas
NCAA Tournament
Mar 13, 1984*	(12 MW)	vs. (12 MW) Alcorn State; Play-in game	L 60–79	24–7	University of Dayton Arena (7,500); Dayton, Ohio
*Non-conference game. ^{#}Rankings from AP Poll. (#) Tournament seedings in parentheses. All times are in Central.
