= 1988 TAAC men's basketball tournament =

- Classification: Division I
- Season: 1987–88
- Teams: 8
- Site: Ocean Center; Daytona Beach, FL
- Champions: Texas–San Antonio (1st title)
- Winning coach: Ken Burmeister (1st title)
- MVP: Frank Hampton (Texas–San Antonio)
- TAAC men's basketball tournaments

1987–88 Trans America Athletic Conference men's basketball standings
	Conf.				Overall
Team	W		L	PCT	W		L	PCT
Georgia Southern	15	–	3	.833	24	–	7	.774
Arkansas–Little Rock	15	–	3	.833	24	–	7	.774
UTSA †	13	–	5	.722	22	–	9	.710
Hardin-Simmons	10	–	8	.556	18	–	12	.600
Mercer	8	–	10	.444	15	–	14	.517
Centenary	8	–	10	.444	13	–	15	.464
Stetson	8	–	10	.444	13	–	15	.464
Georgia State	5	–	13	.278	9	–	19	.321
Houston Baptist	4	–	14	.222	9	–	18	.333
Samford	4	–	14	.222	7	–	20	.259
† 1988 TAAC tournament winner Rankings from AP Poll

The 1988 Trans America Athletic Conference men's basketball tournament (now known as the ASUN men's basketball tournament) was held March 10–12 at Ocean Center in Daytona Beach, Florida.

Texas–San Antonio upset top-seeded Georgia Southern in the championship game, 76–69, to win their first TAAC/Atlantic Sun men's basketball tournament. The Roadrunners, therefore, received an automatic bid to the 1988 NCAA tournament, their first Division I tournament appearance.

For the second straight year, only the top eight teams in the conference standings were invited to the tournament.

== Bracket ==
Quarterfinals; Thursday, March 10
1	Georgia Southern	71
8	Georgia State	55
5	Mercer	57
4	Hardin–Simmons	52
3	Texas–San Antonio	78
6	Stetson	74
7	Centenary (LA)	71
2	Arkansas–Little Rock	99

Semifinals; Friday, March 11
1	Georgia Southern	60
5	Mercer	52
3	Texas–San Antonio	101
2	Arkansas–Little Rock	75

Championship; Saturday, March 12
1	Georgia Southern	69
3	Texas–San Antonio	76
