= 1984–85 Mercer Bears men's basketball team =

American college basketball season

1984–85 Mercer Bears men's basketball

TAAC tournament champions

NCAA tournament, First Round
- Conference: Atlantic Sun Conference
- Record: 22–9 (10–4 A-Sun)
- Head coach: Bill Bibb
- Home arena: Hawkins Arena

1984–85 Trans America Athletic Conference men's basketball standings
	Conf.				Overall
Team	W		L	PCT	W		L	PCT
Georgia Southern	11	–	3	.786	24	–	5	.828
Houston Baptist	10	–	4	.714	21	–	8	.724
Mercer †	10	–	4	.714	22	–	9	.710
Arkansas–Little Rock	9	–	5	.643	17	–	13	.567
Samford	7	–	7	.500	18	–	12	.600
Hardin–Simmons	7	–	7	.500	11	–	17	.393
Centenary	2	–	12	.143	7	–	21	.250
Georgia State	0	–	14	.000	2	–	26	.071
† 1985 TAAC tournament winner Rankings from AP Poll

The 1984–85 Mercer Bears men's basketball team represented Mercer University during the 1984–85 NCAA Division I men's basketball season. The Bears, led by head coach Bill Bibb, played their home games at Hawkins Arena on the university's Macon, Georgia, campus and were members of the Atlantic Sun Conference. They finished the season 22–9, 10–4 in A-Sun play to finish second in the regular season standings. They won the TAAC tournament to earn the conferences automatic bid to the NCAA tournament. In the NCAA Tournament, they were beaten by No. 2 seed Georgia Tech in the opening round.

== Roster ==
1984–85 Mercer Bears men's basketball team
Players	Coaches
Pos. / # / Name / Height / Weight / Year / Hometown; F / 42 / Sam Mitchell / 6 ft 6 in (1.98 m) / 200 lb (91 kg) / Sr / Columbus, Georgia	Head coach: Bill Bibb; Assistant coach(es) Legend: (C) Team captain; (S) Suspended; (I) Ineligible; (W) Walk-on; Injured; Current redshirt

== Schedule and results ==
Date time, TV	Rank^{#}	Opponent^{#}	Result	Record	Site (attendance) city, state
Regular season
Dec 8, 1984*		at Auburn	L 69–70	2–1	Beard-Eaves-Memorial Coliseum; Auburn, Alabama
Dec 28, 1984*		vs. Stanford	W 90–76	6–1	Frank Erwin Center; Austin, Texas
Dec 29, 1984*		at Texas	L 68–69	6–2	Frank Erwin Center; Austin, Texas
TAAC tournament
Mar 2, 1985*		Centenary; Quarterfinals	W 74–70 ^{OT}	20–8	Porter Gym; Macon, Georgia
Mar 3, 1985*		vs. Houston Baptist; Semifinals	W 69–65	21–8	Hanner Fieldhouse; Statesboro, Georgia
Mar 4, 1985*		vs. Arkansas–Little Rock; Championship game	W 105–96	22–8	Hanner Fieldhouse; Statesboro, Georgia
NCAA tournament
Mar 15, 1985*; CBS	(15 E)	vs. (2 E) No. 6 Georgia Tech; First Round	L 58–65	22–9	The Omni; Atlanta, Georgia
*Non-conference game. ^{#}Rankings from AP Poll, (#) during NCAA Tournament is seed within region MW=Midwest. (#) Tournament seedings in parentheses. All times are in Eastern Time.
