= 1980–81 Mercer Bears men's basketball team =

American college basketball season

1980–81 Mercer Bears men's basketball

TAAC tournament champions

NCAA tournament, First round
- Conference: Trans America Athletic Conference
- Record: 18–12 (7–4 TAAC)
- Head coach: Bill Bibb
- Home arena: Hawkins Arena

1980–81 Trans America Athletic Conference men's basketball standings
	Conf.				Overall
Team	W		L	PCT	W		L	PCT
Houston Baptist	9	–	3	.750	18	–	10	.643
NE Louisiana	8	–	4	.667	15	–	13	.536
Mercer †	7	–	4	.636	18	–	12	.600
Centenary	7	–	5	.583	16	–	12	.571
Arkansas–Little Rock	5	–	6	.455	13	–	13	.500
Samford	5	–	6	.455	10	–	17	.370
Northwestern State	5	–	7	.417	11	–	17	.393
Hardin-Simmons	4	–	8	.333	9	–	18	.333
Georgia Southern	2	–	9	.182	5	–	22	.185
† 1981 TAAC tournament winner Rankings from AP Poll

The 1980–81 Mercer Bears men's basketball team represented Mercer University during the 1980–81 NCAA Division I men's basketball season. The Bears, led by head coach Bill Bibb, played their home games at Hawkins Arena on the university's Macon, Georgia, campus and were members of the Trans America Athletic Conference. They finished the season 18–12, 7–4 in TAAC play to finish third in the regular season standings. They won the TAAC tournament to earn the conference's automatic bid to the NCAA Division I tournament. In their first ever NCAA Division I Tournament appearance in school history, they were beaten by No. 5 seed Arkansas in the opening round.

== Roster ==
1980–81 Mercer Bears men's basketball team
Players	Coaches
Pos. / # / Name / Height / Weight / Year / Hometown; F / / Tony Gattis / 6 ft 7 in (2.01 m) / 210 lb (95 kg) / So	Head coach: Bill Bibb; Assistant coach(es) Legend: (C) Team captain; (S) Suspended; (I) Ineligible; (W) Walk-on; Injured; Current redshirt

== Schedule and results ==
Date time, TV	Rank^{#}	Opponent^{#}	Result	Record	Site (attendance) city, state
Regular season
Nov 29, 1980*		St. Leo	W 93–65	1–0	Hawkins Arena; Macon, Georgia
Dec 2, 1980*		at No. 10 North Carolina	L 74–89	1–1	Carmichael Auditorium; Chapel Hill, North Carolina
Dec 6, 1980*		at Arkansas State	L 52–67	1–2	Indian Field House; Jonesboro, Arkansas
Dec 10, 1980*		Ole Miss	L 58–70	1–3	Hawkins Arena (3,145); Macon, Georgia
Dec 13, 1980*		Columbus State	W 56–54	2–3	Hawkins Arena; Macon, Georgia
Dec 15, 1980*		at Georgia State	W 64–61	3–3	GSU Sports Arena; Atlanta, Georgia
Dec 29, 1980*		vs. Southeastern Louisiana	W 74–67	4–3	Maclellan Gymnasium; Chattanooga, Tennessee
Dec 30, 1980*		at Chattanooga	L 58–60 ^{OT}	4–4	Maclellan Gymnasium; Chattanooga, Tennessee
Jan 5, 1981*		UNC Greensboro	W 88–65	5–4	Hawkins Arena; Macon, Georgia
Jan 8, 1981		Centenary	L 72–77	5–5 (0–1)	Hawkins Arena; Macon, Georgia
Jan 10, 1981		Arkansas–Little Rock	W 71–57	6–5 (1–1)	Hawkins Arena; Macon, Georgia
Jan 13, 1981*		at Tulane	L 57–67	6–6	Devlin Fieldhouse; New Orleans, Louisiana
Jan 17, 1981*		Georgia State	W 84–69	7–6	Hawkins Arena; Macon, Georgia
Jan 20, 1981		at Arkansas–Little Rock	L 58–68	7–7 (1–2)	Barton Coliseum; Little Rock, Arkansas
Jan 24, 1981		at Samford	W 90–79	8–7 (2–2)	Seibert Hall; Birmingham, Alabama
Jan 28, 1981*		Arkansas State	W 91–69	9–7	Hawkins Arena; Macon, Georgia
Jan 31, 1981*		Stetson	L 62–63 ^{OT}	9–8	Hawkins Arena; Macon, Georgia
Feb 5, 1981*		Charleston Southern	W 74–64	10–8	Hawkins Arena; Macon, Georgia
Feb 7, 1981		Georgia Southern	W 105–70	11–8 (3–2)	Hawkins Arena; Macon, Georgia
Feb 12, 1981*		at Stetson	L 71–76	11–9	Edmunds Center; DeLand, Florida
Feb 14, 1981		at Georgia Southern	W 60–58 ^{OT}	12–9 (4–2)	Hanner Fieldhouse; Statesboro, Georgia
Feb 16, 1981		Samford	L 60–61	12–10 (4–3)	Hawkins Arena; Macon, Georgia
Feb 19, 1981		Northwestern State	W 94–66	13–10 (5–3)	Hawkins Arena; Macon, Georgia
Feb 21, 1981		Hardin-Simmons	W 93–78	14–10 (6–3)	Hawkins Arena; Macon, Georgia
Feb 26, 1981		at Northeast Louisiana	W 75–66	15–10 (7–3)	Fant–Ewing Coliseum; Monroe, Louisiana
Feb 28, 1981		at Houston Baptist	L 67–69	15–11 (7–4)	Sharp Gymnasium; Houston, Texas
TAAC tournament
Mar 5, 1981*		vs. Arkansas–Little Rock; Quarterfinals	W 78–69	16–11	Hirsch Memorial Coliseum; Shreveport, Louisiana
Mar 6, 1981*		vs. Northeast Louisiana; Semifinals	W 59–55	17–11	Hirsch Memorial Coliseum; Shreveport, Louisiana
Mar 8, 1981*		vs. Houston Baptist; Championship game	W 72–67	18–11	Hirsch Memorial Coliseum; Shreveport, Louisiana
NCAA tournament
Mar 12, 1981*	(12 MW)	vs. (5 MW) No. 20 Arkansas; First round	L 67–73	18–12	Frank Erwin Center; Austin, Texas
*Non-conference game. ^{#}Rankings from AP Poll, (#) during NCAA Tournament is seed within region MW=Midwest. (#) Tournament seedings in parentheses. All times are in Eastern Time.
