= 1994 TAAC men's basketball tournament =

- Classification: Division I
- Season: 1993–94
- Teams: 8
- Site: UCF Arena; Orlando, FL
- Champions: Central Florida (1st title)
- Winning coach: Kirk Speraw (1st title)
- MVP: Victor Saxton (Central Florida)
- TAAC men's basketball tournaments

1993–94 Trans America Athletic Conference men's basketball standings
	Conf.				Overall
Team	W		L	PCT	W		L	PCT
College of Charleston	14	–	2	.875	24	–	4	.857
Central Florida †	11	–	5	.688	21	–	9	.700
Stetson	9	–	7	.563	14	–	15	.483
Georgia State	9	–	7	.563	13	–	14	.481
Centenary	8	–	8	.500	16	–	12	.571
Florida International	7	–	9	.438	11	–	16	.407
Southeastern Louisiana	7	–	9	.438	10	–	17	.370
Samford	4	–	12	.250	10	–	18	.357
Mercer	3	–	13	.188	5	–	24	.172
Florida Atlantic		–		–	3	–	24	.111
† 1994 TAAC tournament winner Rankings from AP poll

The 1994 Trans America Athletic Conference men's basketball tournament (now known as the ASUN men's basketball tournament) was held March 3–5 at the UCF Arena in Orlando, Florida. This was the first tournament since 1992 after not being held in 1993.

Hosts Central Florida defeated Stetson in the championship game, 70–67, to win their first TAAC/Atlantic Sun men's basketball tournament. The Golden Knights, therefore, received the TAAC's automatic bid to the 1994 NCAA tournament, their first Division I tournament appearance (College of Charleston also participated, receiving an at-large bid).

Since the 1992 tournament, one program had departed the TAAC (Georgia Southern, who left for the SoCon) and three new programs were added (Central Florida in 1993, College of Charleston and Florida Atlantic in 1994), leaving total conference membership at ten teams. However, the two newcomers (College of Charleston and FAU) did not participate in this tournament.

== Bracket ==
Quarterfinals; Thursday, March 3
1	Central Florida	90
8	Mercer	68
5	Florida International	67
4	Centenary (LA)	69
3	Stetson	91
6	Southeastern Louisiana	61
7	Samford	78
2	Georgia State	57

Semifinals; Friday, March 4
1	Central Florida	93
4	Centenary (LA)	89
3	Stetson	54
7	Samford	42

Championship; Saturday, March 5
1	Central Florida	70
3	Stetson	67
