= 1984 TAAC men's basketball tournament =

Basketball tournament

- Classification: Division I
- Season: 1983–84
- Teams: 8
- Site: Spring Branch Coliseum; Houston, Texas
- Champions: Houston Baptist (1st title)
- Winning coach: Gene Iba (1st title)
- MVP: Craig Beard (Samford)
- TAAC men's basketball tournaments

1983–84 Trans America Athletic Conference men's basketball standings
	Conf.				Overall
Team	W		L	PCT	W		L	PCT
Houston Baptist †	11	–	3	.786	24	–	7	.774
Samford	10	–	4	.714	22	–	8	.733
Georgia Southern	8	–	6	.571	16	–	12	.571
Arkansas–Little Rock	7	–	7	.500	14	–	15	.483
Centenary	7	–	7	.500	12	–	16	.429
Mercer	6	–	8	.429	14	–	14	.500
Hardin–Simmons	5	–	9	.357	9	–	22	.290
Northwestern State	2	–	12	.143	6	–	22	.214
Nicholls State*	0	–	0	–	19	–	7	.731
† 1984 TAAC tournament winner *Provisional member; played no conference games. Rankings from AP Poll

The 1984 Trans America Athletic Conference men's basketball tournament (now known as the ASUN men's basketball tournament) was held March 8–10, 1984 at Spring Branch Coliseum in Houston, Texas.

Houston Baptist defeated Samford in the championship game, 81–76, to win their first TAAC/Atlantic Sun men's basketball tournament. The Huskies, in turn, received an automatic bid to the 1984 NCAA tournament, their first Division I tournament appearance.

Even though Georgia State joined the TAAC for the 1983–84 season, the Panthers did not compete in the conference tournament.

== Bracket ==
Quarterfinals; Thursday, March 8
1	Houston Baptist	71
8	Northwestern State	53
5	Centenary	72
4	Arkansas–Little Rock	73
3	Georgia Southern	77
6	Mercer	80
7	Hardin–Simmons	69
2	Samford	82

Semifinals; Friday, March 9
1	Houston Baptist	76
4	Arkansas–Little Rock	58
6	Mercer	80
2	Samford	84

Championship; Saturday, March 10
1	Houston Baptist	81
2	Samford	76
