= 1998–99 Samford Bulldogs basketball team =

American college basketball season

1998–99 Samford Bulldogs basketball

TAAC regular season champions TAAC tournament champions

NCAA tournament
- Conference: Trans America Athletic Conference
- Record: 24–6 (15–1 TAAC)
- Head coach: Jimmy Tillette (2nd season)
- Home arena: Seibert Hall

The 1998–99 Samford Bulldogs men's basketball team represented Samford University in the 1998–99 NCAA Division I men's basketball season. The Bulldogs, led by second-year head coach Jimmy Tillette, played their home games at the Pete Hanna Center in Homewood, Alabama as members of the Trans America Athletic Conference. After finishing first in the TAAC regular season standings, Samford won the TAAC tournament to secure the conference's automatic bid to the NCAA tournament – the first appearance in school history. As No. 14 seed in the South region, the Bulldogs were defeated by No. 3 seed St. John's in the opening round.

== Roster ==
1998–99 Samford Bulldogs men's basketball team
Players	Coaches
Pos. / # / Name / Height / Weight / Year / Hometown; F / / Marc Salyers / 6 ft 9 in (2.06 m) / — / So	Head coach: Jimmy Tillette (Birmingham–Southern); Assistant coach(es) Legend: (C) Team captain; (S) Suspended; (I) Ineligible; (W) Walk-on; Injured; Current redshirt; Roster

== Schedule and results ==
Date time, TV	Rank^{#}	Opponent^{#}	Result	Record	Site (attendance) city, state
Regular season
TAAC tournament
NCAA tournament
Mar 11, 1999*	(14 S)	vs. (3 S) No. 9 St. John's; First round	L 43–69	24–6	Orlando Arena; Orlando, Florida
*Non-conference game. ^{#}Rankings from AP Poll. (#) Tournament seedings in parentheses. S=South. All times are in Central.
