= ISU Holiday Classic =

- Sport: College basketball
- First season: 1995
- No. of teams: 4
- Country: United States
- Venue: Hilton Coliseum
- Most titles: Iowa State (4)
- Broadcaster: Cyclone Television Network

The ISU Holiday Classic was a four-team college basketball tournament typically held during the early part of NCAA Division I men's basketball season, with the inaugural tournament beginning in 1995 and lasting until 1999. Games were hosted at Iowa State University's Hilton Coliseum.

== All-time brackets ==
=== 1995 ISU Holiday Classic ===
Semifinals; December 21, 1995
Princeton	47
Iowa State	50
Samford	69
Nicholls State	53

Championship Round; December 22, 1995
Samford	59
Iowa State	71
3rd Place Game
Princeton	86
Nicholls State	51

=== 1996 ISU Holiday Classic ===
Semifinals; December 21, 1996
East Tennessee State	49
5	Iowa State	77
UTEP	77
Nevada	65

Championship Round; December 22, 1996
UTEP	48
5	Iowa State	59
3rd Place Game
Nevada	68
East Tennessee State	49

=== 1997 ISU Holiday Classic ===
Semifinals; December 20, 1997
Alaska-Anchorage	55
Iowa State	57
Detroit Mercy	74
Grambling	56

Championship Round; December 21, 1997
Detroit Mercy	67
Iowa State	56
3rd Place Game
Alaska-Anchorage	79 OT
Grambling	73

=== 1998 The Tribune Holiday Classic ===
Semifinals; December 22, 1998
New Orleans	51
Iowa State	61
Rice	81 OT
St. Mary's (CA)	70

Championship Round; December 23, 1998
Rice	45
Iowa State	50
3rd Place Game
New Orleans	72
St. Mary's (CA)	68

=== 1999 The Tribune Holiday Classic ===
Semifinals; December 21, 1999
Idaho State	49
Iowa State	89
Texas A&M-Corpus Christi	76
Samford	74

Championship Round; December 22, 1999
Texas A&M-Corpus Christi	64
Iowa State	86
3rd Place Game
Samford	86
Idaho State	67

== All-time results ==
Team	W	L	Pct.	Outright Titles	Last Appearance
Detroit Mercy	2	0	1.000	1	1997
Iowa State	9	1	.900	4	1999
Samford	2	2	.500		1999
Alaska-Anchorage	1	1	.500		1997
Nevada	1	1	.500		1996
New Orleans	1	1	.500		1998
Princeton	1	1	.500		1995
Rice	1	1	.500		1998
Texas-El Paso	1	1	.500		1996
Texas A&M-Corpus Christi	1	1	.500		1996
East Tennessee State	0	2	.000		1996
Grambling	0	2	.000		1997
Idaho State	0	2	.000		1999
Nicholls State	0	2	.000		1995
St. Mary's (CA)	0	2	.00		1998
