= Ken Burmeister =

American college basketball coach (1947–2020)

Biographical details
- Born: June 3, 1947; Twin Lakes, Wisconsin, U.S.
- Died: May 19, 2020 (aged 72); San Antonio, Texas, U.S.
- Education: St. Mary's (TX)

Coaching career (HC unless noted)
- 1976–1979: Texas–Arlington (assistant)
- 1979–1983: Iowa (assistant)
- 1983–1986: Arizona (assistant)
- 1986–1990: UTSA
- 1990–1994: DePaul (assistant)
- 1994–1998: Loyola (IL)
- 1998–1999: Trinity
- 2006–2018: Incarnate Word

Head coaching record
- Overall: 330–262
- Tournaments: 0–1 (NCAA Division I); 0–2 (NCAA Division II); 0–1 (CIT)

Accomplishments and honors

Championships
- TAAC tournament (1988); 2 Heartland tournament (2009, 2010); 2 Heartland regular season (2009, 2010)

Ken Burmeister (June 3, 1947 – May 19, 2020) was an American college basketball coach. He was the head coach of the University of the Incarnate Word for 12 seasons from 2006 until 2018.

Burmeister graduated from St. Mary's University, Texas, and served on the staff of Lute Olson at Iowa and Arizona from 1979 to 1986. Burmeister coached at University of Texas at San Antonio from 1986 to 1990 and led the team to its first appearance in the NCAA Tournament in 1988, where they lost to Illinois. He served as an assistant coach at DePaul before taking over at Loyola (IL) in 1994. He posted a 40–71 record at Loyola and oversaw the team's move to Joseph J. Gentile Arena in 1996. Burmeister coached at Trinity University in San Antonio, Texas, from 1998 to 1999. He died on May 19, 2020, from cancer.

== Head coaching record ==
Record table
Season	Team	Overall	Conference	Standing	Postseason
UTSA Roadrunners (Trans America Athletic Conference) (1986–1990)
1986–87	UTSA	13–15	7–11	6th	
1987–88	UTSA	22–9	13–5	3rd	NCAA Division I First Round
1988–89	UTSA	15–13	8–10	7th	
1989–90	UTSA	22–7	13–3	2nd	
UTSA:		72–44 (.621)	41–29 (.586)		
Loyola Ramblers (Midwestern Collegiate Conference) (1994–1998)
1994–95	Loyola	5–22	2–13	11th	
1995–96	Loyola	8–19	5–11	8th	
1996–97	Loyola	12–15	7–9	5th	
1997–98	Loyola	15–15	6–8	6th	
Loyola:		40–71 (.360)	13–27 (.325)		
Trinity Tigers (Southern Collegiate Athletic Conference) (1998–1999)
1998–99	Trinity	16–9	11–7	3rd	
Trinity:		16–9 (.640)	11–7 (.611)		
Incarnate Word Cardinals (Heartland Conference) (2006–2010)
2006–07	Incarnate Word	18–11	9–3	2nd	
2007–08	Incarnate Word	17–11	6–4	T–2nd	
2008–09	Incarnate Word	23–7	13–3	1st	NCAA Division II First Round
2009–10	Incarnate Word	23–7	13–3	1st	NCAA Division II First Round
Incarnate Word Cardinals (Lone Star Conference) (2010–2013)
2010–11	Incarnate Word	16–10	5–9	6th (South)	
2011–12	Incarnate Word	16–11	11–7	4th	
2012–13	Incarnate Word	14–14	9–9	T–4th	
Incarnate Word Cardinals (Southland Conference) (2013–2018)
2013–14	Incarnate Word	21–6	9–5	5th	
2014–15	Incarnate Word	18–11	10–8	5th	CIT First Round
2015–16	Incarnate Word	17–12	12–6	T–3rd	
2016–17	Incarnate Word	12–17	7–11	T–8th	
2017–18	Incarnate Word	7–21	2–16	T–11th	
Incarnate Word:		202–138 (.594)	106–84 (.558)		
Total:		330–262 (.557)			
National champion Postseason invitational champion Conference regular season champion Conference regular season and conference tournament champion Division regular season champion Division regular season and conference tournament champion Conference tournament champion
