= 1987–88 UTSA Roadrunners men's basketball team =

American college basketball season

1987–88 UTSA Roadrunners men's basketball

TAAC tournament champion

NCAA tournament
- Conference: Trans America Athletic Conference
- Record: 22–9 (13–5 TAAC)
- Head coach: Ken Burmeister (2nd season)
- Home arena: Convocation Center

1987–88 Trans America Athletic Conference men's basketball standings
	Conf.				Overall
Team	W		L	PCT	W		L	PCT
Georgia Southern	15	–	3	.833	24	–	7	.774
Arkansas–Little Rock	15	–	3	.833	24	–	7	.774
UTSA †	13	–	5	.722	22	–	9	.710
Hardin-Simmons	10	–	8	.556	18	–	12	.600
Mercer	8	–	10	.444	15	–	14	.517
Centenary	8	–	10	.444	13	–	15	.464
Stetson	8	–	10	.444	13	–	15	.464
Georgia State	5	–	13	.278	9	–	19	.321
Houston Baptist	4	–	14	.222	9	–	18	.333
Samford	4	–	14	.222	7	–	20	.259
† 1988 TAAC tournament winner Rankings from AP Poll

The 1987–88 UTSA Roadrunners men's basketball team represented the University of Texas at San Antonio in the 1987–88 college basketball season. This was head coach Ken Burmeister's second season at UTSA. They played their home games at the Convocation Center. The Roadrunners finished the season 22–9, 13–5 in TAAC play to finish in third place. They won the TAAC tournament to advance to the NCAA tournament for the first time in program history. Playing as the No. 14 seed in the Southeast region, UTSA was beaten by No. 3 seed Illinois in the round of 64.

== Roster ==
1987–88 UTSA Roadrunners men's basketball team
Players	Coaches
Pos. / # / Name / Height / Weight / Year / Previous school / Hometown; F / 24 / Frank Hampton / 6 ft 4 in (1.93 m) / — / Sr	Head coach: Ken Burmeister (St. Mary's (TX)); Assistant coach(es) Legend: (C) Team captain; (S) Suspended; (I) Ineligible; (W) Walk-on; Injured; Current redshirt

== Schedule and results ==
- All times are Central

Date time, TV	Rank^{#}	Opponent^{#}	Result	Record	Site (attendance) city, state
Non-conference Regular season
Nov 27, 1987*		vs. La Salle; CBT Invitational Tournament	L 51–74	0–1	Hartford Civic Center (3,500); Hartford, Connecticut
Nov 28, 1987*		at Hartford; CBT Invitational Tournament	W 79–76 ^{3OT}	1–1	Hartford Civic Center (3,500); Hartford, Connecticut
Dec 5, 1987*		Huston-Tillotson	W 88–73	2–1	Convocation Center (1,115); San Antonio, Texas
Dec 12, 1987*		UT Arlington	W 95–74	3–1	Convocation Center (1,390); San Antonio, Texas
Dec 19, 1987*		Schreiner	W 97–69	4–1	Convocation Center (1,184); San Antonio, Texas
Dec 21, 1987*		at No. 7 Syracuse	L 84–108	4–2	Carrier Dome (26,222); Syracuse, New York
Dec 23, 1987*		at DePaul	L 82–93	4–3	Rosemont Horizon (10,140); Rosemont, Illinois
TAAC Regular season
Jan 2, 1988; 6:00 p.m.		Georgia Southern	W 70–61	5–3 (1–0)	Convocation Center (1,322); San Antonio, Texas
Jan 4, 1988		Stetson	W 81–62	6–3 (2–0)	Convocation Center (2,204); San Antonio, Texas
Jan 7, 1988		at Houston Baptist	W 60–50	7–3 (3–0)	Sharp Gymnasium (1,679); Houston, Texas
Jan 9, 1988		at Centenary (LA)	L 74–75	7–4 (3–1)	Gold Dome (1,463); Shreveport, Louisiana
Jan 14, 1988		Little Rock	L 65–74	7–5 (3–2)	Convocation Center (3,056); San Antonio, Texas
Jan 16, 1988		Samford	W 84–61	8–5 (4–2)	Convocation Center (1,384); San Antonio, Texas
Non-conference Regular season
Jan 18, 1988*		at UT Arlington	W 79–72 ^{OT}	9–5	Texas Hall (650); Arlington, Texas
Jan 20, 1988*		vs. Saint Mary's	W 84–74 ^{OT}	10–5	(5,369)
TAAC Regular season
Jan 23, 1988		at Hardin-Simmons	W 81–79	11–5 (5–2)	Mabee Complex (1,501); Abilene, Texas
Jan 28, 1988		at Georgia State	L 65–87	11–6 (5–3)	GSU Sports Arena (1,237); Atlanta, Georgia
Jan 30, 1988		at Mercer	L 77–78	11–7 (5–4)	Porter Gym (1,003); Macon, Georgia
Feb 4, 1988		at Georgia Southern	W 50–47	12–7 (6–4)	Hanner Fieldhouse (3,547); Statesboro, Georgia
Feb 6, 1988		at Stetson	W 74–72 ^{OT}	13–7 (7–4)	Edmunds Center (4,180); DeLand, Florida
Feb 11, 1988		Houston Baptist	W 80–63	14–7 (8–4)	Convocation Center (1,589); San Antonio, Texas
Feb 13, 1988		Centenary (LA)	W 102–85	15–7 (9–4)	Convocation Center (1,489); San Antonio, Texas
Feb 18, 1988		at Little Rock	L 70–75 ^{OT}	15–8 (9–5)	Barton Coliseum (4,200); Little Rock, Arkansas
Feb 20, 1988		at Samford	W 80–59	16–8 (10–5)	Seibert Hall (925); Homewood, Alabama
Feb 27, 1988		Hardin-Simmons	W 91–80	17–8 (11–5)	Convocation Center (1,782); San Antonio, Texas
Mar 3, 1988		Georgia State	W 91–83	18–8 (12–5)	Convocation Center (1,676); San Antonio, Texas
Mar 5, 1988		Mercer	W 108–85	19–8 (13–5)	Convocation Center (1,612); San Antonio, Texas
TAAC tournament
Mar 10, 1988*		at Stetson; Quarterfinals	W 78–74	20–8	Ocean Center (3,122); DeLand, Florida
Mar 11, 1988*		vs. Little Rock; Semifinals	W 101–75	21–8	Ocean Center (1,702); DeLand, Florida
Mar 12, 1988*		vs. Georgia Southern; Championship game	W 76–69 ^{OT}	22–8	Ocean Center (1,811); DeLand, Florida
NCAA tournament
Mar 18, 1988*	(14 SE)	vs. (3 SE) No. 16 Illinois; First Round	L 72–81	22–9	Riverfront Coliseum (16,562); Cincinnati, Ohio
*Non-conference game. ^{#}Rankings from AP poll. (#) Tournament seedings in parentheses. SE=Southeast.
