= 1999–2000 Samford Bulldogs basketball team =

American college basketball season

1999–2000 Samford Bulldogs basketball

TAAC tournament champions

NCAA tournament
- Conference: Trans America Athletic Conference
- Record: 21–11 (12–6 TAAC)
- Head coach: Jimmy Tillette (3rd season)
- Home arena: Seibert Hall

1999–2000 Trans America Athletic Conference men's basketball standings
	Conf.				Overall
Team	W		L	PCT	W		L	PCT
Troy State	13	–	5	.722	17	–	11	.607
Georgia State	13	–	5	.722	17	–	12	.586
Samford †	12	–	6	.667	21	–	11	.656
Jacksonville State	12	–	6	.667	17	–	11	.607
UCF	10	–	8	.556	14	–	18	.438
Campbell	10	–	8	.556	12	–	16	.429
Stetson	8	–	10	.444	13	–	15	.464
Mercer	7	–	11	.389	12	–	21	.364
Jacksonville	5	–	13	.278	8	–	19	.296
Florida Atlantic	0	–	18	.000	2	–	28	.067
† 2000 TAAC tournament winner Rankings from AP Poll

The 1999–2000 Samford Bulldogs men's basketball team represented Samford University in the 1999–2000 NCAA Division I men's basketball season. The Bulldogs, led by third-year head coach Jimmy Tillette, played their home games at the Siebert Hall in Homewood, Alabama as members of the Trans America Athletic Conference. After finishing third in the TAAC regular season standings, Samford won the TAAC tournament for the second straight season to receive an automatic bid to the NCAA tournament. As No. 13 seed in the Midwest region, the Bulldogs were defeated by No. 4 seed Syracuse in the opening round.

== Roster ==
1999–2000 Samford Bulldogs men's basketball team
Players	Coaches
Pos. / # / Name / Height / Weight / Year / Hometown; F / / Marc Salyers / 6 ft 9 in (2.06 m) / — / Jr	Head coach: Jimmy Tillette (Birmingham–Southern); Assistant coach(es) Legend: (C) Team captain; (S) Suspended; (I) Ineligible; (W) Walk-on; Injured; Current redshirt; Roster

== Schedule and results ==
Date time, TV	Rank^{#}	Opponent^{#}	Result	Record	Site (attendance) city, state
Regular season
Nov 19, 1999*		vs. No. 15 St. John's; CoSIDA Classic	W 68–60	1–0	The Pit; Albuquerque, New Mexico
Nov 20, 1999*		vs. Dayton; CoSIDA Classic	L 63–65	1–1	The Pit; Albuquerque, New Mexico
Nov 23, 1999*		Louisiana-Monroe	L 60–67	1–2	Seibert Hall; Rock Hill, South Carolina
Nov 27, 1999*		Texas-Arlington	W 91–63	2–2	Seibert Hall; Rock Hill, South Carolina
Dec 2, 1999*		at Alabama	W 79–67 ^{OT}	3–2	Coleman Coliseum; Tuscaloosa, Alabama
Dec 4, 1999		at Jacksonville	L 71–73	3–3 (0–1)	Jacksonville Memorial Coliseum; Jacksonville, Florida
Dec 6, 1999		Campbell	W 71–39	4–3 (1–1)	Seibert Hall; Rock Hill, South Carolina
Dec 11, 1999*		at Belmont	W 81–65	5–3	Striplin Gymnasium; Nashville, Tennessee
Dec 18, 1999*		North Georgia	W 92–35	6–3	Seibert Hall; Rock Hill, South Carolina
Dec 21, 1999*		vs. Texas A&M–Corpus Christi; The Tribune Holiday Classic	L 74–76	6–4	Hilton Coliseum; Ames, Iowa
Dec 22, 1999*		vs. Idaho State; The Tribune Holiday Classic	W 86–67	7–4	Hilton Coliseum; Ames, Iowa
Dec 30, 1999*		at Wyoming	L 73–80	7–5	Arena-Auditorium; Laramie, Wyoming
Jan 4, 2000		at Stetson	W 73–57	8–5 (2–1)	Edmunds Center; DeLand, Florida
Jan 8, 2000		Central Florida	W 75–67	9–5 (3–1)	Seibert Hall; Rock Hill, South Carolina
Jan 10, 2000		Florida Atlantic	W 90–46	10–5 (4–1)	Seibert Hall; Rock Hill, South Carolina
Jan 13, 2000		at Troy	L 65–77	10–6 (4–2)	Trojan Arena; Troy, Alabama
Jan 15, 2000		at Mercer	W 63–51	11–6 (5–2)	Porter Gym; Macon, Georgia
Jan 22, 2000		at Jacksonville State	L 65–69 ^{OT}	11–7 (5–3)	Pete Mathews Coliseum; Jacksonville, Georgia
Jan 25, 2000		Georgia State	L 51–69	11–8 (5–4)	Seibert Hall; Rock Hill, South Carolina
Jan 29, 2000		Jacksonville State	W 68–53	12–8 (6–4)	Seibert Hall; Rock Hill, South Carolina
Feb 3, 2000		at Campbell	L 55–58	12–9 (6–5)	Carter Gymnasium; Buies Creek, North Carolina
Feb 5, 2000		at Georgia State	W 58–57	13–9 (7–5)	GSU Sports Arena; Atlanta, Georgia
Feb 10, 2000		Stetson	W 92–57	14–9 (8–5)	Seibert Hall; Rock Hill, South Carolina
Feb 12, 2000		Jacksonville	W 79–58	15–9 (9–5)	Seibert Hall; Rock Hill, South Carolina
Feb 17, 2000		at Florida Atlantic	W 75–56	16–9 (10–5)	FAU Arena; Boca Raton, Florida
Feb 19, 2000		at Central Florida	L 68–71 ^{OT}	16–10 (10–6)	UCF Arena; Orlando, Florida
Feb 24, 2000		Mercer	W 61–57	17–10 (11–6)	Seibert Hall; Rock Hill, South Carolina
Feb 26, 2000		Troy	W 70–49	18–10 (12–6)	Seibert Hall; Rock Hill, South Carolina
TAAC tournament
Mar 2, 2000*		vs. Campbell	W 80–61	19–10	Pete Mathews Coliseum; Jacksonville, Alabama
Mar 3, 2000*		vs. Georgia State; Semifinals	W 83–80	20–10	Jacksonville Memorial Coliseum; Jacksonville, Florida
Mar 4, 2000*		vs. Central Florida; Championship game	W 78–69	21–10	Jacksonville Memorial Coliseum; Jacksonville, Florida
NCAA tournament
Mar 16, 2000*	(13 MW)	vs. (4 MW) No. 16 Syracuse; First Round	L 65–79	21–11	CSU Convocation Center; Cleveland, Ohio
*Non-conference game. ^{#}Rankings from AP Poll. (#) Tournament seedings in parentheses. MW=Midwest. All times are in Central.
