= Gene Iba =

American college basketball coach (1940–2025)

Biographical details
- Born: November 5, 1940; Joplin, Missouri, U.S.
- Died: September 22, 2025 (aged 84)

Playing career
- 1958–1961: Tulsa

Coaching career (HC unless noted)
- 1966–1968: Oklahoma A&M (GA)
- 1969–1972: Roosevelt HS
- 1972–1977: UTEP (assistant)
- 1977–1985: Houston Baptist
- 1985–1992: Baylor
- 1995–2010: Pittsburg State

Administrative career (AD unless noted)
- 1968–1969: Cleveland HS

Head coaching record
- Overall: 487–374
- Tournaments: 0–2 (NCAA Division I); 4–5 (NCAA Division II); 0–1 (NIT)

Accomplishments and honors

Championships
- TAAC tournament (1984); 2 TAAC regular season (1981, 1984); MIAA regular season (1999)

Awards
- TAAC Coach of the Year (1981); MIAA Coach of the Year (1999)

Clarence Eugene Iba (November 5, 1940 – September 22, 2025) was an American college basketball coach. He was previously the Pittsburg State Gorillas men's basketball coach until 2010. Iba was head coach at Houston Baptist from 1977 to 1985, Baylor from 1985 to 1992, and Pittsburg State from 1995 to 2010. He was the son of college basketball coach Clarence Iba and nephew of college basketball coach Hank Iba.

== Background ==
Born in Joplin, Missouri, Clarence Eugene Iba attended the University of Tulsa, where he played basketball from 1958 to 1961 under his father, head coach Clarence Victor Iba. After graduating in 1963, Gene Iba went to the Navy Supply Corps School and coached its basketball team. Iba then attended Oklahoma A&M (now Oklahoma State University) and served as a graduate assistant for the basketball team under his uncle Henry Iba while completing his master's degree in business education.

Iba died on September 22, 2025, at the age of 84.

== Coaching career ==
In 1968, Iba became athletic director at Cleveland High School in St. Louis. He then became head varsity basketball coach at Roosevelt High School in St. Louis in 1969 and led Roosevelt to the city championship in 1972.

Iba moved up to the college rankings in 1972 as an assistant coach at UTEP under Don Haskins and remained for five seasons, during which UTEP made the 1975 NCAA Tournament.

After UTEP, Iba became head coach at Houston Baptist in 1977. Iba turned around a program that went 11–44 in the past two years to a 14–13 record in 1979–80 and 18–10 record in 1980–81. The Trans American Athletic Conference (now Atlantic Sun Conference) named Iba the Coach of the Year in 1981. Houston Baptist improved further, making the 1984 NCAA Tournament.

Iba moved to Baylor as head coach in 1985 and led Baylor to post-season appearances in the 1987 NIT and 1988 NCAA Tournament. However, Baylor fell to 5–22 in the 1988–89 season and never made another postseason tournament. After the 1991–92 season, Baylor decided not to renew Iba's contract.

Iba became head coach at Division II Pittsburg State in 1995. By Iba's second season, Pittsburg State earned its first national ranking in five years and first-ever NCAA Tournament victory. On February 15, 1999, Pittsburg State was ranked #1 in Division II men's basketball. and Iba was named MIAA Coach of the Year 1999. In 15 seasons as head coach, Iba had a 261–172 record with five NCAA Tournament appearances.

== Head coaching record ==
Record table
Season	Team	Overall	Conference	Standing	Postseason
Houston Baptist Huskies (NCAA Division I independent) (1977–1978)
1977–78	Houston Baptist	7–19			
Houston Baptist Huskies (Trans American Athletic Conference) (1978–1985)
1978–79	Houston Baptist	11–16	1–4	5th	
1979–80	Houston Baptist	14–13	2–4	6th	
1980–81	Houston Baptist	18–10	9–3	1st	
1981–82	Houston Baptist	13–14	8–8	T–5th	
1982–83	Houston Baptist	20–9	10–4	2nd	
1983–84	Houston Baptist	24–7	11–3	1st	NCAA Division I Preliminary Round
1984–85	Houston Baptist	21–8	10–4	T–2nd	
Houston Baptist:		128–96	51–30		
Baylor Bears (Southwest Conference) (1985–1992)
1985–86	Baylor	11–16	3–13	8th	
1986–87	Baylor	18–14	10–6	2nd	NIT First Round
1987–88	Baylor	23–11	11–5	T–2nd	NCAA Division I First Round
1988–89	Baylor	5–22	1–15	9th	
1989–90	Baylor	16–14	7–9	T–5th	NIT First Round
1990–91	Baylor	12–15	4–12	T–7th	
1991–92	Baylor	13–15	5–9	6th	
Baylor:		98–106	41–69		
Pittsburg State Gorillas (Mid-America Intercollegiate Athletics Association) (1995–2010)
1995–96	Pittsburg State	14–14	9–7		
1996–97	Pittsburg State	24–8	14–4	2nd	NCAA Division II Sweet 16
1997–98	Pittsburg State	24–6	12–4	3rd	NCAA Division II Second Round
1998–99	Pittsburg State	24–5	14–2	T–1st	NCAA Division II Second Round
1999–2000	Pittsburg State	16–13	9–9	T–5th	
2000–01	Pittsburg State	21–9	13–5		
2001–02	Pittsburg State	17–10	11–7		
2002–03	Pittsburg State	16–12	8–10	6th	
2003–04	Pittsburg State	18–11	9–9	5th	
2004–05	Pittsburg State	23–7	13–5	3rd	NCAA Division II Second Round
2005–06	Pittsburg State	9–19	5–11	T–7th	
2006–07	Pittsburg State	18–13	9–9	T–5th	NCAA Division II First Round
2007–08	Pittsburg State	18–10	9–9	T–6th	
2008–09	Pittsburg State	10–17	5–15	10th	
2009–10	Pittsburg State	9–18	3–13	T–10th	
Pittsburg State:		261–172	143–119		
Total:		487–374			
National champion Postseason invitational champion Conference regular season champion Conference regular season and conference tournament champion Division regular season champion Division regular season and conference tournament champion Conference tournament champion
