= 1993–94 Charleston Cougars men's basketball team =

American college basketball season

1993–94 Charleston Cougars men's basketball

TAAC Regular season champion

NCAA tournament, first round
- Conference: Trans America Athletic Conference
- East Division
- Record: 24–4 (14–2 TAAC)
- Head coach: John Kresse (15th season)
- Home arena: F. Mitchell Johnson Center

1993–94 Trans America Athletic Conference men's basketball standings
	Conf.				Overall
Team	W		L	PCT	W		L	PCT
College of Charleston	14	–	2	.875	24	–	4	.857
Central Florida †	11	–	5	.688	21	–	9	.700
Stetson	9	–	7	.563	14	–	15	.483
Georgia State	9	–	7	.563	13	–	14	.481
Centenary	8	–	8	.500	16	–	12	.571
Florida International	7	–	9	.438	11	–	16	.407
Southeastern Louisiana	7	–	9	.438	10	–	17	.370
Samford	4	–	12	.250	10	–	18	.357
Mercer	3	–	13	.188	5	–	24	.172
Florida Atlantic		–		–	3	–	24	.111
† 1994 TAAC tournament winner Rankings from AP poll

The 1993–94 College of Charleston Cougars men's basketball team represented the College of Charleston during the 1993–94 NCAA Division I men's basketball season. The Cougars, led by 15th-year head coach John Kresse, played their home games at F. Mitchell Johnson Arena in Charleston, South Carolina as members of the Trans America Athletic Conference (TAAC).

After finishing atop the conference regular season standings (14–2), the Cougars did not participate in the 1994 TAAC tournament, but did receive an at-large bid to the NCAA tournament – the first appearance in school history – as No. 12 seed in the Southeast region. College of Charleston lost to No. 5 seed Wake Forest in the opening round. The team finished with an overall record of 24–4.

== Roster ==
1993–94 College of Charleston Cougars men's basketball team
Players
Coaches

Pos.	#	Name	Height	Weight	Year	Previous school	Hometown
C	4	Thaddeous Delaney	6 ft 8 in (2.03 m)	250 lb (113 kg)	Fr	Eau Claire High School (Columbia, SC)	Columbia, SC
G	5	Marion Busby	5 ft 11 in (1.8 m)	—	Jr	Eau Claire High School (Columbia, SC)	Columbia, SC
F	21	Stacy Harris	6 ft 4 in (1.93 m)	—	Fr	West Potomac	Alexandria, Virginia
G	24	Anthony Johnson (injured)	6 ft 3 in (1.91 m)	195 lb (88 kg)	So	R.B. Stall	Charleston, South Carolina
F	42	Rodney Conner	6 ft 7 in (2.01 m)	—	Fr	Orangeburg-Wilkinson	Orangeburg, South Carolina

Head coach

- John Kresse (St. John's)

Assistant coach(es)

Legend

- (C) Team captain
- (S) Suspended
- (I) Ineligible
- (W) Walk-on
- Injured
- Current redshirt

Roster

== Schedule and results ==
Date time, TV	Rank^{#}	Opponent^{#}	Result	Record	Site (attendance) city, state
Regular season
Nov 27, 1993*		Webber	W 88–59	1–0	F. Mitchell Johnson Center; Charleston, South Carolina
Nov 29, 1993*		South Carolina State	W 70–57	2–0	F. Mitchell Johnson Center; Charleston, South Carolina
Dec 4, 1993*		Charleston Southern	W 116–78	3–0	F. Mitchell Johnson Center; Charleston, South Carolina
Dec 18, 1993*		Mount Olive	W 106–89	4–0	F. Mitchell Johnson Center; Charleston, South Carolina
Dec 22, 1993*		at South Carolina	L 53–65 ^{OT}	4–1	Carolina Coliseum; Columbia, South Carolina
Dec 28, 1993*		Penn State	W 71–65	5–1	North Charleston Coliseum; North Charleston, South Carolina
Dec 29, 1993*		Alabama	W 82–60	6–1	North Charleston Coliseum; North Charleston, South Carolina
Jan 3, 1994		Samford	W 67–56	7–1 (1–0)	F. Mitchell Johnson Center; Charleston, South Carolina
Feb 28, 1994		at Samford	W 69–59	24–3 (14–2)	Seibert Hall; Homewood, Alabama
TAAC tournament
Did not participate
NCAA Tournament
Mar 17, 1994*	(12 SE)	vs. (5 SE) Wake Forest; First round	L 58–68	24–4	Rupp Arena; Lexington, Kentucky
*Non-conference game. ^{#}Rankings from AP Poll. (#) Tournament seedings in parentheses. SE=Southeast. All times are in Eastern.

== Awards and honors ==
- Marion Busby – TAAC Player of the Year
- John Kresse – TAAC Coach of the Year
