= Mack Coleman =

American basketball player

Personal information
- Born: July 18, 1952 Flora, Mississippi, U.S.
- Died: June 12, 1977 (aged 24) Houston, Texas, U.S.
- Listed height: 6 ft 9 in (2.06 m)
- Listed weight: 195 lb (88 kg)

Career information
- High school: E. Flora (Flora, Mississippi)
- College: Utica JC (1971–1972); Houston Baptist (1972–1975)
- NBA draft: 1975: 4th round, 55th overall pick
- Drafted by: New Orleans Jazz
- Playing career: 1976–1977
- Position: Forward
- Stats at Basketball Reference

Mack Coleman (July 18, 1952 – June 12, 1977) was an American professional basketball player. He played college basketball for the Houston Baptist Huskies and was selected in the 1975 NBA draft by the New Orleans Jazz. Coleman played professionally in France during the 1976–77 season. He died from a double coronary occlusion in a Houston jail after he had been arrested on an intoxication charge.

== Early life ==
Coleman was raised in Flora, Mississippi, as the younger brother of E.C. Coleman. He did not play basketball in high school; E.C. claimed that it was because of a feud with the team's coach. Coleman admitted that he "messed around in high school" and only got by because he was E.C.'s brother.

== College career ==
After spending a season at Utica Junior College in Utica, Mississippi, Coleman played with E.C. — now the star player for the Houston Baptist Huskies — in a gym at the Houston Baptist University campus and caught the eye of the team's coaches. He transferred to Houston Baptist as a sophomore in 1972 where he was partnered with E.C. for his senior season. Coleman played for the Huskies from 1972 to 1975. He almost missed his senior season because of eligibility problems but managed to improve his academics. Coleman averaged 22.3 points and 13.2 rebounds per game during his senior season.

== Professional career ==
Coleman was selected in the 1975 NBA draft by the New Orleans Jazz where his brother played. He was also selected by the San Diego Conquistadors in the eighth round of the 1975 ABA draft. Coleman attended rookie tryout camp with the Jazz in July, and signed in September but never played in a game for them.

Coleman played professionally for a team in Calais, France, during the 1976–77 season. He planned to sign a three-year contract with the team when he returned to Houston in June 1977.

== Death ==
On the night of June 11, 1977, Coleman was located by police acting erratically atop a Houston building and made threats that he would jump. He was arrested on a charge of public intoxication. Two hours later, at 1:30 a.m. the following morning, Coleman died in custody at the Houston Central Police Station. Harris County medical examiners listed Coleman's cause of death as a double coronary occlusion from an enlarged heart and extensive arteriosclerosis. The medical examiner concluded that Coleman was not drunk and was instead likely experiencing an anoxic spell caused by his heart disease. Coleman's conditions were hereditary and his brother was advised to see a doctor.

E.C. said that he "loved [Coleman] more than anything in the world." After learning of the news, E.C. lost substantial weight when he fell behind in a physical fitness program and later admitted it "took [him] a while to get [himself] together—mentally and physically." On Coleman's death, E.C. stated in an interview: "I don't think I'll ever get over it."

== See also ==
- List of basketball players who died during their careers
