= 2007–08 Belmont Bruins men's basketball team =

American college basketball season

2007–08 Belmont Bruins men's basketball

Atlantic Sun regular season and tournament champions

NCAA tournament, Round of 64
- Conference: Atlantic Sun Conference
- Record: 25–9 (14–2 A Sun)
- Head coach: Rick Byrd
- Home arena: Curb Event Center

2007–08 Atlantic Sun men's basketball standings
	Conf.				Overall
Team	W		L	PCT	W		L	PCT
Belmont †	14	–	2	.875	25	–	9	.735
Jacksonville	12	–	4	.750	18	–	13	.581
East Tennessee State	11	–	5	.688	19	–	13	.594
Stetson	11	–	5	.688	16	–	16	.500
Gardner–Webb	9	–	7	.563	16	–	16	.500
Lipscomb	9	–	7	.563	15	–	16	.484
Kennesaw State	7	–	9	.438	10	–	20	.333
Mercer	6	–	10	.375	11	–	19	.367
Florida Gulf Coast	6	–	10	.375	10	–	21	.323
Campbell	5	–	11	.313	10	–	20	.333
USC Upstate	5	–	11	.313	7	–	23	.233
North Florida	1	–	15	.063	3	–	26	.103
† 2008 Atlantic Sun Tournament winner As of March 3, 2008; Rankings from AP Poll

The 2007–08 Belmont Bruins men's basketball team represented Belmont University during the 2007–08 NCAA Division I men's basketball season. The Bruins, led by 22nd year head coach Rick Byrd, played their home games at the Curb Event Center and are members of the Atlantic Sun Conference. They finished the season 25–9, 14–2 in A-Sun play to win the regular season conference championship. They also were champions of the 2008 Atlantic Sun men's basketball tournament to earn an automatic bid to the NCAA tournament. As No. 15 seed in the West region, the Bruins lost to No. 2 seed Duke by a single point, 71–70.

== Roster ==
2007–08 Belmont Bruins men's basketball team
Players
Coaches

Pos.	#	Name	Height	Weight	Year	Hometown
F	2	Shane Dansby	6 ft 4 in (1.93 m)	210 lb (95 kg)	Jr	Pegram, Tennessee
G	12	Alex Renfroe	6 ft 1 in (1.85 m)	165 lb (75 kg)	Jr	Hermitage, Tennessee
G	24	Justin Hare	6 ft 3 in (1.91 m)	195 lb (88 kg)	Sr	Cleveland, Tennessee

Head coach

- Rick Byrd

Assistant coach(es)

Legend

- (C) Team captain
- (S) Suspended
- (I) Ineligible
- (W) Walk-on
- Injured
- Current redshirt

== Schedule and results ==
Date time, TV	Rank^{#}	Opponent^{#}	Result	Record	Site (attendance) city, state
Regular season
Nov 9, 2007*		at Cincinnati	W 86–75	1–0	Fifth Third Arena (7,723); Cincinnati, Ohio
Nov 10, 2007*		vs. Bowling Green State	L 67–78	1–1	Fifth Third Arena (8,119); Cincinnati, Ohio
Nov 11, 2007*		vs. Western Carolina	W 79–70	2–1	Fifth Third Arena (7,073); Cincinnati, Ohio
Nov 15, 2007*		at Samford	W 82–73	3–1	Pete Hanna Center (1,518); Birmingham, Alabama
Nov 17, 2007*		at Austin Peay	L 56–71	3–2	Dunn Center (2,800); Clarksville, Tennessee
Nov 19, 2007*		at Alabama	W 85–83	4–2	Coleman Coliseum (9,094); Tuscaloosa, Alabama
Nov 26, 2007*		Middle Tennessee	W 85–62	5–2	Curb Event Center (1,516); Nashville, Tennessee
Dec 1, 2007*		at No. 23 Xavier	L 49–90	5–3	Cintas Center (9,761); Cincinnati, Ohio
Dec 4, 2007*		Fisk	W 106–49	6–3	Curb Event Center (814); Nashville, Tennessee
Dec 12, 2007*		at Middle Tennessee	L 80–86 ^{OT}	6–4	Murphy Center (2,812); Murfreesboro, Tennessee
Dec 17, 2007*		Tennessee State	W 82–71	7–4	Curb Event Center (1,203); Nashville, Tennessee
Dec 19, 2007*		Austin Peay	L 84–93	7–5	Curb Event Center (1,337); Nashville, Tennessee
Dec 29, 2007*		vs. Wright State	L 74–78 ^{OT}	7–6	McKenzie Arena (4,108); Chattanooga, Tennessee
Dec 30, 2007*		vs. Murray State	W 84–67	8–6	McKenzie Arena (3,652); Chattanooga, Tennessee
Jan 3, 2008		at Gardner-Webb	W 87–84	9–6 (1–0)	Paul Porter Arena (1,760); Boiling Springs, North Carolina
Jan 5, 2008		at Campbell	L 75–83	9–7 (1–1)	Carter Gymnasium (847); Buies Creek, North Carolina
Jan 12, 2008		at Lipscomb	W 99–91 ^{2OT}	10–7 (2–1)	Allen Arena (5,107); Nashville, Tennessee
Jan 17, 2008		East Tennessee State	W 86–83	11–7 (3–1)	Curb Event Center (1,596); Nashville, Tennessee
Jan 19, 2008		South Carolina Upstate	W 76–52	12–7 (4–1)	Curb Event Center (1,627); Nashville, Tennessee
Jan 24, 2008		at Kennesaw State	L 79–81	12–8 (4–2)	KSU Convocation Center (1,289); Kennesaw, Georgia
Jan 26, 2008		at Mercer	W 93–82	13–8 (5–2)	University Center (949); Macon, Georgia
Jan 31, 2008		at Stetson	W 83–75	14–8 (6–2)	Edmunds Center (1,816); DeLand, Florida
Feb 2, 2008		Florida Gulf Coast	W 86–74	15–8 (7–2)	Curb Event Center (1,133); Nashville, Tennessee
Feb 7, 2008		Jacksonville	W 85–78	16–8 (8–2)	Curb Event Center (1,447); Nashville, Tennessee
Feb 9, 2008		North Florida	W 79–56	17–8 (9–2)	Curb Event Center (1,603); Nashville, Tennessee
Feb 14, 2008		at East Tennessee State	W 87–75	18–8 (10–2)	Memorial Center (4,262); Johnson City, Tennessee
Feb 16, 2008		at South Carolina Upstate	W 82–72	19–8 (11–2)	G.B. Hodge Center (775); Valley Falls, South Carolina
Feb 22, 2008		Lipscomb	W 74–65	20–8 (12–2)	Curb Event Center (5,072); Nashville, Tennessee
Feb 28, 2008		Campbell	W 75–64	21–8 (13–2)	Curb Event Center (1,162); Nashville, Tennessee
Mar 1, 2008		Gardner-Webb	W 76–73	22–8 (14–2)	Curb Event Center (1,367); Nashville, Tennessee
Atlantic Sun tournament
Mar 5, 2008*		Campbell; Quarterfinals	W 75–66	23–8	Allen Arena (1,537); Nashville, Tennessee
Mar 7, 2008*		East Tennessee State; Semifinals	W 69–65	24–8	Allen Arena (1,948); Nashville, Tennessee
Mar 8, 2008*		Jacksonville; Championship Game	W 79–61	25–8	Allen Arena (2,510); Nashville, Tennessee
NCAA tournament
Mar 20, 2008*	(15 W)	vs. (2 W) No. 9 Duke; First Round	L 70–71	25–9	Verizon Center (18,400); Washington, D.C.
*Non-conference game. ^{#}Rankings from AP poll. (#) Tournament seedings in parentheses. W=West. All times are in Central Time.
