= 2009 Atlantic Sun men's basketball tournament =

- Classification: Division I
- Season: 2008–09
- Teams: 7
- Site: Allen Arena; Nashville, Tennessee
- Champions: East Tennessee State (1st title)
- Winning coach: Murry Bartow (1st title)
- MVP: Kevin Tiggs (East Tennessee State)

2008–09 Atlantic Sun men's basketball standings
	Conf.				Overall
Team	W		L	PCT	W		L	PCT
Jacksonville	15	–	5	.750	18	–	14	.563
East Tennessee State †	14	–	6	.700	23	–	11	.676
Belmont	14	–	6	.700	20	–	13	.606
Lipscomb	12	–	8	.600	17	–	14	.548
Mercer	11	–	9	.550	17	–	15	.531
Campbell	11	–	9	.550	14	–	16	.467
Stetson	9	–	11	.450	13	–	17	.433
USC Upstate	8	–	12	.400	9	–	21	.300
Florida Gulf Coast	7	–	13	.350	11	–	20	.355
North Florida	6	–	14	.300	8	–	22	.267
Kennesaw State	3	–	17	.150	7	–	22	.241
† 2009 Atlantic Sun Tournament winner As of March 2, 2009; Rankings from AP Poll

The 2009 Atlantic Sun men's basketball tournament took place from March 4–7, 2009 at Allen Arena in Nashville, Tennessee.

== Format ==
The seven eligible men's basketball teams in the Atlantic Sun Conference receive a berth in the conference tournament. After the 20 game conference season, teams are seeded by conference record. The winner of the tournament receives an automatic bid to the NCAA tournament. The #1 seed, if not tournament champions, will receive an automatic bid to the NIT.

== Bracket ==
First round March 4–5
4	Lipscomb	82
5	Campbell	52
3	Belmont	65
6	Mercer	64
2	East Tennessee State	90
7	Stetson	76

Semifinals; March 6
1	Jacksonville	88
4	Lipscomb	72
3	Belmont	74
2	East Tennessee State	88

Finals; March 7
1	Jacksonville	68
2	East Tennessee State	85

== Sources ==
- Atlantic Sun Basketball Championship
