= 1993–94 UCF Golden Knights men's basketball team =

American college basketball season

1993–94 UCF Golden Knights men's basketball
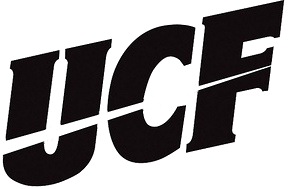

TAAC tournament champions

NCAA tournament, first round
- Conference: Trans American Athletic Conference
- Record: 21–9 (11–5 TAAC)
- Head coach: Kirk Speraw (1st season)
- Home arena: UCF Arena

1993–94 Trans America Athletic Conference men's basketball standings
	Conf.				Overall
Team	W		L	PCT	W		L	PCT
College of Charleston	14	–	2	.875	24	–	4	.857
Central Florida †	11	–	5	.688	21	–	9	.700
Stetson	9	–	7	.563	14	–	15	.483
Georgia State	9	–	7	.563	13	–	14	.481
Centenary	8	–	8	.500	16	–	12	.571
Florida International	7	–	9	.438	11	–	16	.407
Southeastern Louisiana	7	–	9	.438	10	–	17	.370
Samford	4	–	12	.250	10	–	18	.357
Mercer	3	–	13	.188	5	–	24	.172
Florida Atlantic		–		–	3	–	24	.111
† 1994 TAAC tournament winner Rankings from AP poll

The 1993–94 UCF Golden Knights men's basketball team represented the University of Central Florida as members of the Trans America Athletic Conference during the 1993–94 NCAA Division I men's basketball season. They played their home games at the UCF Arena in Orlando, Florida, and were led by head coach Kirk Speraw who was in his first season with the team. After finishing second in the regular season TAAC standings, the Golden Knights won the TAAC tournament to secure the conference's automatic bid to the NCAA tournament – the first appearance in school history. Playing as the No. 16 seed in the Southeast region, UCF was beaten handily by No. 1 seed Purdue, 98–67.

== Roster ==
1993–94 UCF Knights men's basketball team
Players	Coaches
Pos. / # / Name / Height / Weight / Year / Hometown; F / 00 / Ochiel Swaby / 6 ft 7 in (2.01 m) / 190 lb (86 kg) / Jr / Miami, Florida	Head coach: Kirk Speraw (Iowa); Assistant coach(es) Legend: (C) Team captain; (S) Suspended; (I) Ineligible; (W) Walk-on; Injured; Current redshirt

== Schedule and results ==
Date time, TV	Rank^{#}	Opponent^{#}	Result	Record	Site city, state
Regular season
Dec 20, 1993*		at Florida	L 69–83	5–1	Stephen C. O'Connell Center; Gainesville, Florida
TAAC tournament
Mar 3, 1994*		Mercer; Quarterfinals	W 90–68	19–8	UCF Arena; Orlando, Florida
Mar 4, 1994*		Centenary; Semifinals	W 93–89	20–8	UCF Arena; Orlando, Florida
Mar 5, 1994*		Stetson; Championship game	W 70–67	21–8	UCF Arena; Orlando, Florida
NCAA tournament
Mar 17, 1994*	(16 SE)	vs. (1 SE) No. 3 Purdue; First round	L 67–98	21–9	Rupp Arena; Lexington, Kentucky
*Non-Conference Game. Rankings from AP poll. All times are in Eastern Time.
