= 2008–09 East Tennessee State Buccaneers men's basketball team =

American college basketball season

2008–09 East Tennessee State Buccaneers men's basketball
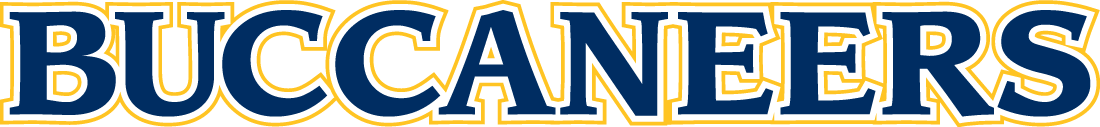

A-Sun tournament champion

NCAA tournament, Round of 64
- Conference: Atlantic Sun Conference
- Record: 23–11 (14–6 A-Sun)
- Head coach: Murry Bartow (4th season)
- Home arena: Memorial Center

2008–09 Atlantic Sun men's basketball standings
	Conf.				Overall
Team	W		L	PCT	W		L	PCT
Jacksonville	15	–	5	.750	18	–	14	.563
East Tennessee State †	14	–	6	.700	23	–	11	.676
Belmont	14	–	6	.700	20	–	13	.606
Lipscomb	12	–	8	.600	17	–	14	.548
Mercer	11	–	9	.550	17	–	15	.531
Campbell	11	–	9	.550	14	–	16	.467
Stetson	9	–	11	.450	13	–	17	.433
USC Upstate	8	–	12	.400	9	–	21	.300
Florida Gulf Coast	7	–	13	.350	11	–	20	.355
North Florida	6	–	14	.300	8	–	22	.267
Kennesaw State	3	–	17	.150	7	–	22	.241
† 2009 Atlantic Sun Tournament winner As of March 2, 2009; Rankings from AP Poll

The 2008–09 East Tennessee State Buccaneers men's basketball team represented East Tennessee State University in the 2008–09 NCAA Division I men's basketball season. The Buccaneers, led by head coach Murry Bartow, played their home games at the Memorial Center in Johnson City, Tennessee, as members of the Atlantic Sun Conference. After finishing 2nd in the conference regular season standings, the Buccaneers won the A-Sun tournament to earn an automatic bid to the NCAA tournament as the No. 16 seed in the East region.

East Tennessee State was beaten by No. 1 seed Pittsburgh in the first round, 72–62.

== Roster ==
2008–09 East Tennessee State Buccaneers men's basketball team
Players
Coaches

Pos.	#	Name	Height	Weight	Year	Hometown
G	1	Mike Smith	6 ft 6 in (1.98 m)	225 lb (102 kg)	Jr	Vandalia, Missouri
G	3	Courtney Pigram	6 ft 1 in (1.85 m)	195 lb (88 kg)	Sr	Memphis, Tennessee
G	11	Jocolby Davis	6 ft 1 in (1.85 m)	165 lb (75 kg)	Sr	Meridian, Mississippi
G	13	Tommy Hubbard	6 ft 4 in (1.93 m)	205 lb (93 kg)	So	Boston, Massachusetts
G	20	Adam Sollazzo	6 ft 6 in (1.98 m)	185 lb (84 kg)	Fr	Tampa, Florida
G	25	Jarvis Jones	6 ft 2 in (1.88 m)	160 lb (73 kg)	Fr	Memphis, Tennessee
G	30	Micah Williams	6 ft 4 in (1.93 m)	220 lb (100 kg)	So	Manchester, Tennessee
F	34	Greg Hamlin	6 ft 7 in (2.01 m)	210 lb (95 kg)	Sr	Flint, Michigan
F	41	Isiah Brown	6 ft 8 in (2.03 m)	200 lb (91 kg)	RS Fr	Miami, Florida
F	42	Kevin Tiggs	6 ft 4 in (1.93 m)	210 lb (95 kg)	Sr	Flint, Michigan
C	43	Seth Coy	6 ft 11 in (2.11 m)	240 lb (109 kg)	Fr	Montgomery, Indiana
F	44	J.C. Ward	6 ft 6 in (1.98 m)	215 lb (98 kg)	Fr	Marietta, Georgia

Head coach

- Murry Bartow (UAB)

Assistant coach(es)

Legend

- (C) Team captain
- (S) Suspended
- (I) Ineligible
- (W) Walk-on
- Injured
- Current redshirt

Roster
Last update: April 27, 2022

== Schedule and results ==
Date time, TV	Rank^{#}	Opponent^{#}	Result	Record	Site city, state
Regular season
November 14, 2008*		vs. Temple; Charleston Classic	L 65–79	0–1	Carolina First Arena (527); Charleston, SC
November 15, 2008*		vs. SIU Edwardsville; Charleston Classic	W 65–62	1–1	Carolina First Arena; Charleston, SC
November 16, 2008*		vs. Hofstra; Charleston Classic	L 75–76	1–2	Carolina First Arena (382); Charleston, SC
November 20, 2008*		Wingate	W 96–66	2–2	Memorial Center (2,751); Johnson City, TN
November 24, 2008*		at Tennessee Tech	W 78–65	3–2	Eblen Center (1,350); Cookeville, TN
November 29, 2008*		at Bradley	L 69–82	3–3	Carver Arena (9,006); Peoria, IL
December 2, 2008*		at Marshall	W 76–72	4–3	Cam Henderson Center (5,310); Huntington, WV
December 5, 2008		at Mercer	W 81–61	5–3 (1–0)	University Center (2,127); Macon, GA
December 13, 2008*		at Appalachian State	W 89–70	6–3	George M. Holmes Convocation Center (2,520); Boone, NC
December 17, 2008*		Chattanooga	W 82–70	7–3	Memorial Center (3,102); Johnson City, TN
December 23, 2008		at Kennesaw State	W 76–62	8–3 (2–0)	KSU Convocation Center (1,243); Kennesaw, TN
December 30, 2008*		Morehead State	L 61–71	8–4	Memorial Center (3,138); Johnson City, TN
January 3, 2009		Jacksonville	W 84–82	9–4 (3–0)	Memorial Center (3,472); Johnson City, TN
January 5, 2009		North Florida	W 84–57	10–4 (4–0)	Memorial Center (2,711); Johnson City, TN
January 10, 2009		at Stetson	W 73–67	11–4 (5–0)	Edmunds Center (1,257); DeLand, FL
January 12, 2009		at Florida Golf Coast	L 61–64	11–5 (5–1)	Alico Arena (1,455); Fort Myers, FL
January 17, 2009		Lipscomb	W 85–82 ^{OT}	12–5 (6–1)	Memorial Center (3,192); Johnson City, TN
January 19, 2009		Belmont	W 87–57	13–5 (7–1)	Memorial Center (4,196); Johnson City, TN
January 22, 2009		Campbell	W 79–60	14–5 (8–1)	Memorial Center (3,239); Johnson City, TN
January 26, 2009		USC Upstate	W 82–72	15–5 (9–1)	Memorial Center (3,854); Johnson City, TN
January 30, 2009		at Jacksonville	L 72–82	15–6 (9–2)	Jacksonville Veterans Memorial Arena (3,648); Jacksonville
February 1, 2009		at North Florida	W 67–64	16–6 (10–2)	UNF Arena (683); Jacksonville, FL
February 7, 2009		Florida Gulf Coast	W 102–78	17–6 (11–2)	Memorial Center (4,045); Johnson City, TN
February 9, 2009		Stetson	L 63–64	17–7 (11–3)	Memorial Center (3,074); Johnson City, TN
February 14, 2009		at Belmont	L 73–76	17–8 (11–4)	Curb Event Center (1,802); Nashville, TN
February 16, 2009		at Lipscomb	L 91–96 ^{OT}	17–9 (11–5)	Allen Arena (1,317); Nashville, TN
February 19, 2009		at USC Upstate	W 66–61	18–9 (12–5)	G. B. Hodge Center (922); Spartanburg, SC
February 23, 2009		at Campbell	L 62–68	18–10 (12–6)	John W. Pope Jr. Convocation Center (1,143); Buies Creek, NC
February 26, 2009		Kennesaw State	W 81–46	19–10 (13–6)	Memorial Center (3,149); Johnson City, TN
February 28, 2009		Mercer	W 103–81	20–10 (14–6)	Memorial Center (4,609); Johnson City, TN
Atlantic Sun tournament
March 4, 2009	(2)	vs. (7) Stetson; A-Sun Quarterfinals	W 90–76	21–10	Allen Arena (1,014); Nashville, TN
March 6, 2009	(2)	vs. (3) Belmont; A-Sun Semifinals	W 88–74	22–10	Allen Arena; Nashville, TN
March 7, 2009	(2)	vs. (1) Jacksonville; A-Sun Championship	W 85–68	23–10	Allen Arena (1,609); Nashville, TN
NCAA tournament
March 20, 2009	(16 E)	vs. (1 E) No. 4 Pittsburgh; NCAA First Round	L 62–72	23–11	UD Arena (12,499); Dayton, OH
*Non-conference game. ^{#}Rankings from AP Poll. (#) Tournament seedings in parentheses.
