= 1999 TAAC men's basketball tournament =

- Classification: Division I
- Season: 1998–99
- Teams: 8
- Site: Jacksonville Coliseum; Jacksonville, FL
- Champions: Samford (1st title)
- Winning coach: Jimmy Tillette (1st title)
- MVP: Marc Salyers (team=Samford)
- TAAC men's basketball tournaments

The 1999 Trans America Athletic Conference men's basketball tournament (now known as the Atlantic Sun men's basketball tournament) was held February 25–27 at the Jacksonville Coliseum in Jacksonville, Florida.

Top-seeded Samford defeated UCF in the championship game, 89–61, to win their first TAAC/Atlantic Sun men's basketball tournament.

The Bulldogs, therefore, received the TAAC's automatic bid to the 1999 NCAA tournament, their first Division I tournament appearance.

== Format ==
College of Charleston and Florida International departed the TAAC prior the season while Jacksonville was added; total membership decreased from twelve to eleven.

While the regular season division structure was ended, it was continued that only the top eight teams from the conference standings qualified for the tournament field.

== Bracket ==
Quarterfinals; Thursday, February 25
1	Samford	67
8	Campbell	51
5	Stetson	54
4	Centenary	57
3	Georgia State	78
6	Jacksonville	58
7	Troy State	55
2	UCF	66

Semifinals; Friday, February 26
1	Samford	62
4	Centenary	54
3	Georgia State	60
2	UCF	67

Championship; Saturday, February 27
1	Samford	89
2	UCF	61
