= 2000 TAAC men's basketball tournament =

- Classification: Division I
- Season: 1999–00
- Teams: 10
- Site: Jacksonville Coliseum; Jacksonville, FL
- Champions: Samford (2nd title)
- Winning coach: Jimmy Tillette (2nd title)
- MVP: Marc Salyers (Samford)
- TAAC men's basketball tournaments

1999–2000 Trans America Athletic Conference men's basketball standings
	Conf.				Overall
Team	W		L	PCT	W		L	PCT
Troy State	13	–	5	.722	17	–	11	.607
Georgia State	13	–	5	.722	17	–	12	.586
Samford †	12	–	6	.667	21	–	11	.656
Jacksonville State	12	–	6	.667	17	–	11	.607
UCF	10	–	8	.556	14	–	18	.438
Campbell	10	–	8	.556	12	–	16	.429
Stetson	8	–	10	.444	13	–	15	.464
Mercer	7	–	11	.389	12	–	21	.364
Jacksonville	5	–	13	.278	8	–	19	.296
Florida Atlantic	0	–	18	.000	2	–	28	.067
† 2000 TAAC tournament winner Rankings from AP Poll

The 2000 Trans America Athletic Conference men's basketball tournament (now known as the ASUN men's basketball tournament) was held March 1–4 at the Jacksonville Coliseum in Jacksonville, Florida.

In a rematch of the 1999 final, Samford again defeated UCF in the championship game, 78–69, winning their second TAAC/Atlantic Sun men's basketball tournament.

The Bulldogs, therefore, received the TAAC's automatic bid to the 2000 NCAA tournament.

== Format ==
For the first time since its establishment in 1979, the TAAC tournament expanded beyond 8 teams, with all 10 conference members participating in the 2000 tournament field.

Centenary departed the TAAC for the Mid-Continent Conference prior to the 1999–2000 season.

== Bracket ==
First round Wednesday, March 1
9	Jacksonville	48
8	Mercer	55
7	Stetson	56
10	Florida Atlantic	66

Quarterfinals; Thursday, March 2
1	Troy State	75
8	Mercer	79
5	UCF	74
4	Jacksonville State	55
3	Samford	80
6	Campbell	61
10	Florida Atlantic	54
2	Georgia State	77

Semifinals; Friday, March 3
8	Mercer	79
5	UCF	84
3	Samford	83
2	Georgia State	80

Championship; Saturday, March 4
5	UCF	69
3	Samford	78
