= Don Coleman (basketball) =

American basketball coach (1933–2020)

Biographical details
- Born: February 2, 1933; Port Arthur, Texas, U.S.
- Died: February 9, 2020 (aged 87); Houston, Texas, U.S.

Playing career
- 1951–1953: Lamar Tech

Coaching career (HC unless noted)
- 1955–1957: Jefferson HS (TX) (assistant)
- 1957–1962: Aldine HS (TX)
- 1962–1992: Memorial HS (TX)

Head coaching record
- Overall: 890–331 (.729)

Brandon Charles “Don” Coleman (February 2, 1933 – February 9, 2020) was a Texas high school basketball coach. He is the namesake of the Don Coleman Coliseum in Houston, and retired in 1992 as one of the ten winningest high school basketball coaches in the United States.

== Early life and education ==
Don Coleman was born on February 2, 1933, in Port Arthur, Texas, to Brandon – a State Champion tennis player – and Sydney Coleman, a teacher. He was raised with a brother and two sisters. He played high school basketball and tennis for the Thomas Jefferson High School in Port Arthur, and in 1952 he attended Lamar University on tennis and basketball scholarships. He began focusing solely on tennis in his sophomore year, and led the team to three consecutive Lone Star Conference singles championships and won the NAIA doubles title. Upon graduation he was awarded the university's John Gray Award given to the best student athlete.

== Coaching career ==
=== Early career ===
Coleman became an assistant coach for his alma mater under head coach Pete Pense in 1955 until 1957. He then spent five years as the head coach of the Aldine High School men's basketball team in Houston. His team placed third in the state championships in 1960.

=== Memorial Mustangs ===
In 1962 he then left for Memorial High School in Houston upon the school's opening, where he became the first head coach for their basketball team. Coleman was the head coach of Memorial Mustangs high school basketball team from 1962 to 1992. From 1964 to 1971 the team won consecutive district championships and 81 consecutive 5A district games, which remains a record in the State of Texas. He led the Mustangs to eighteen district championships in all. For twenty-six consecutive seasons as coach, the team had twenty or more victories over his career, and averaged 25 wins per season. Coleman coached the Mustangs to the 1966 Texas state championship, and led the team to the final three other times in 1967, 1969, and 1984. One of the things he was known for was the importance of physical conditioning—having his players run up to five miles per day before the season started in order to condition them for late game pushes.

=== Retirement ===
Coleman retired with 893 wins, which at the time was the all-time third best record in the State of Texas and eighth best record in the United States. In 1992, upon his retirement, the Spring Branch Community Coliseum was renamed the Don Coleman Coliseum in his honor. He also coached the Texas High School All-Star Game in his final year, his second time since he coached it the year his team won the state championship in 1966. He was also awarded the UIL Denius Award for Coaching Excellence. The Don Coleman Outstanding Coach award was also named for him by its awarding body, the Texas Association of Basketball Coaches in 1999. He has been named to both the Texas High School Basketball Hall of Fame, the Texas High School Coaches Association Hall of Honor, and in 2000, was named to the Port Arthur Thomas Jefferson High School Hall of Honor and in 2001, the Lamar University Hall of Honor and the Fellowship of Christian Athletes Ring of Honor. In 2019 a life-sized statue of Coleman was added to the entrance of Don Coleman Coliseum.

== Personal life ==
Coleman was married to Mary Kay Coleman, with whom he shared four children from previous marriages: Brandon, Jr., Kevin, Scott, and Barbara. Post-retirement, he increased his dedication to the church. He died in Houston on February 9, 2020.

== Head coaching record ==
Record table
Season	Team	Overall	Conference	Standing	Postseason
Aldine Mustangs (Aldine Independent School District) (1957–1962)
1957–58	Aldine	13–18			
1958–59	Aldine	15–15			
1959–60	Aldine	31–4			
1960–61	Aldine	30–9			
1961–62	Aldine	9–22			
Aldine:		98–68 (.590)			
Memorial Mustangs (Spring Branch Independent School District) (1962–1992)
1962–63	Memorial	13–18			
1963–64	Memorial	33–5			
1964–65	Memorial	33–3			
1965–66	Memorial	34–4			
1966–67	Memorial	35–6			
1967–68	Memorial	27–6			
1968–69	Memorial	42–1			
1969–70	Memorial	37–4			
1970–71	Memorial	24–10			
1971–72	Memorial	20–12			
1972–73	Memorial	25–7			
1973–74	Memorial	22–9			
1974–75	Memorial	26–9			
1975–76	Memorial	24–10			
1976–77	Memorial	20–16			
1977–78	Memorial	22–12			
1978–79	Memorial	27–9			
1979–80	Memorial	27–7			
1980–81	Memorial	31–6			
1981–82	Memorial	36–5			
1982–83	Memorial	27–6			
1983–84	Memorial	31–8			
1984–85	Memorial	29–6			
1985–86	Memorial	23–9			
1986–87	Memorial	25–8			
1987–88	Memorial	33–4			
1988–89	Memorial	21–12			
1989–90	Memorial	16–17			
1990–91	Memorial	13–18			
1991–92	Memorial	16–16			
Memorial:		792–263 (.751)			
Total:		890–331 (.729)			
