= 2008 Atlantic Sun men's basketball tournament =

- Classification: Division I
- Season: 2007–08
- Teams: 8
- Site: Allen Arena; Nashville, Tennessee
- Champions: Belmont (3rd title)
- Winning coach: Rick Byrd (3rd title)
- MVP: Shane Dansby (Belmont)

2007–08 Atlantic Sun men's basketball standings
| | Conf. | | | | Overall |
| Team | W | | L | PCT | W | | L | PCT |
|---|---|---|---|---|---|---|---|---|
| Belmont † | 14 | – | 2 | .875 | 25 | – | 9 | .735 |
| Jacksonville | 12 | – | 4 | .750 | 18 | – | 13 | .581 |
| East Tennessee State | 11 | – | 5 | .688 | 19 | – | 13 | .594 |
| Stetson | 11 | – | 5 | .688 | 16 | – | 16 | .500 |
| Gardner–Webb | 9 | – | 7 | .563 | 16 | – | 16 | .500 |
| Lipscomb | 9 | – | 7 | .563 | 15 | – | 16 | .484 |
| Kennesaw State | 7 | – | 9 | .438 | 10 | – | 20 | .333 |
| Mercer | 6 | – | 10 | .375 | 11 | – | 19 | .367 |
| Florida Gulf Coast | 6 | – | 10 | .375 | 10 | – | 21 | .323 |
| Campbell | 5 | – | 11 | .313 | 10 | – | 20 | .333 |
| USC Upstate | 5 | – | 11 | .313 | 7 | – | 23 | .233 |
| North Florida | 1 | – | 15 | .063 | 3 | – | 26 | .103 |
† 2008 Atlantic Sun Tournament winner As of March 3, 2008; Rankings from AP Poll

The 2008 Atlantic Sun men's basketball tournament took place March 5–8, 2008, at Allen Arena in Nashville, Tennessee.

== Format ==
The eight eligible men's basketball teams in the Atlantic Sun Conference receive a berth in the conference tournament. After the 16 game conference season, teams are seeded by conference record.

== Bracket ==
Quarterfinals; March 5–6
1 | Belmont | 75
8 | Campbell | 66
4 | East Tennessee State | 81
5 | Lipscomb | 74
3 | Stetson | 63
6 | Gardner–Webb | 82
2 | Jacksonville | 65
7 | Mercer | 57

Semifinals; March 7
1 | Belmont | 69
4 | East Tennessee State | 65
6 | Gardner–Webb | 80
2 | Jacksonville | 89

Finals; March 8
1 | Belmont | 79
2 | Jacksonville | 61

== Sources ==
- Atlantic Sun Basketball Championship
