= Jimmy Tillette =

College basketball coach

Current position
- Title: Head coach

Biographical details
- Born: April 8, 1950 (age 76); New Orleans, Louisiana, U.S.

Coaching career (HC unless noted)
- 1975–1982: Jesuit HS (asst.)
- 1982–1989: De La Salle HS
- 1989–1990: Mississippi State (asst.)
- 1990–1991: Tulane (asst.)
- 1991–1997: Samford (asst.)
- 1997–2012: Samford
- 2013–2019: Isidore Newman School

Accomplishments and honors

Championships
- 2 TAAC tournament (1999, 2000); TAAC regular season (1999)

Awards
- TAAC Coach of the Year (1999)

Jimmy Tillette (born April 8, 1950) is an American college basketball coach and the former head coach of the men's basketball team at Samford University in Birmingham, Alabama. Born in New Orleans, Louisiana. Tillette was the head coach of the Bulldogs team from 1997-2012, and is the school's winningest coach. He assumed his former position when John Brady left Samford to become the head basketball coach at LSU. In fifteen seasons as the coach of the Bulldogs, Tillette compiled record of 229–219, leading the Bulldogs to their only two appearances in the NCAA Men's Division I Basketball Championship in 1999 and 2000 while they were a member of the Atlantic Sun Conference. The 1999–2000 season was highlighted by upset wins over traditional basketball powers St. John's and Alabama. Tillette most recently served as head coach of the boys' basketball team at Isidore Newman High School in New Orleans, Louisiana. He retired in 2019 and was replaced by former Co-National Player of the Year and Newman alum Randy Livingston.
