= Bruno-Nazaire Kongaouin =

Central African basketball player

Bruno Nazaire Kongawoin
Personal information
- Born: 12 October 1966 (age 60) Bangui, Central African Republic
- Listed height: 6 ft 8 in (2.03 m)
- Listed weight: 209 lb (95 kg)

Career information
- College: Houston Baptist (1983–1987)
- NBA draft: 1987: undrafted
- Position: Guard

Career highlights
- 2× All-TAAC (1986–1987)

Bruno Nazaire Kongawoin (born 12 October 1966) is a Central African former basketball player. Born in Bangui, he played college basketball for the Houston Baptist Huskies from 1983 to 1987 and was a two-time All-Trans America Athletic Conference (TAAC) selection during his final two years. Kongawoin participated at the 1988 Summer Olympics with the Central African Republic national basketball team. Following the Games, he was released by the Milwaukee Bucks of the National Basketball Association (NBA) just prior to the 1988–89 season. He was previously released by the Bucks prior to the 1987–88 NBA season.

Kongawoin was inducted into the Houston Baptist University Athletics Hall of Honor in 2016.
