= Anicet Lavodrama =

Central African Republic basketball player

Personal information
- Born: 4 July 1963 (age 63) Bangui, Central African Republic
- Listed height: 6 ft 9 in (2.06 m)
- Listed weight: 180 lb (82 kg)

Career information
- College: Houston Baptist (1981–1985)
- NBA draft: 1985: 3rd round, 52nd overall pick
- Drafted by: Los Angeles Clippers
- Playing career: 1985–1998
- Position: Center

Career history
- 1985–1994: Ferrol
- 1994–1995: Valladolid
- 1995–1996: Joventut
- 1996–1998: Valladolid

Career highlights
- 3× First-team All-TAAC (1983–1985)
- Stats at Basketball Reference

Anicet-Richard Lavodrama y Ondoma (born 4 July 1963) is a Central African-Spanish former professional basketball player.

== Early life ==
Lavodrama was born in Bangui, Central African Republic, as the sixth eldest of 13 siblings. His father worked as a diplomat and Lavodrama moved frequently as a child; he lived in Zaire, the Ivory Coast, the Soviet Union, Angola, Nigeria and Mali.

== Professional career ==
Lavodrama played for the Houston Baptist Huskies from 1981 until 1985, and he was selected by the Los Angeles Clippers in the 3rd round of the 1985 NBA draft. Lavodrama also played in 345 games in the top-tier level league in Spain, the Liga ACB, between 1985 and 1998 (except for the 1987–88 season, after his club, OAR Ferrol, were relegated).

== Central African Republic national team ==
Lavodrama competed at the 1988 Summer Olympics with the Central African Republic national basketball team. Appearing in each of the seven games, Lavodrama scored 30 points twice, and also had a double-double in 4 of the six games.
