= Bill Bibb =

American college basketball coach and administrator (1934–2020)

Biographical details
- Born: November 13, 1934; Owensboro, Kentucky, U.S.
- Died: July 9, 2020 (aged 85)

Playing career
- 1953–1955: Kentucky
- 1956–1957: Kentucky Wesleyan
- Position: Center

Coaching career (HC unless noted)

Men's basketball
- 1957–1966: Kentucky Wesleyan (assistant)
- 1966–1969: Trinity (TX) (assistant)
- 1969–1971: Saint Louis (assistant)
- 1971–1973: Utah State (assistant)
- 1973–1974: Mercer (assistant)
- 1974–1989: Mercer

Administrative career (AD unless noted)
- 1980–1989: Mercer
- 1989–1991: UT Arlington
- 1991–2006: Atlantic Sun Conference (commissioner)

Accomplishments and honors

Championships
- 2x Trans America Athletic Conference men's basketball tournament champion (1981, 1985)

William Clyde Bibb (November 13, 1934 – July 9, 2020) was an American basketball player, coach, and administrator who was the head men's basketball coach and athletic director at Mercer University and commissioner of the Atlantic Sun Conference.

== Early life ==
Bibb was a reserve Center on the undefeated 1953–54 Kentucky Wildcats men's basketball team. In 1956, he returned to his native Owensboro, Kentucky and averaged a double-double (15.0 points per game and 11.9 rebounds per game) for the Kentucky Wesleyan Panthers men's basketball team.

== Coaching ==
After graduating, Bibb remained at Kentucky Wesleyan as an assistant basketball coach. From 1959 to 1966, he was head coach of KWC's baseball team. In 1966, he became an assistant at Trinity (TX) under Bob Polk. In 1969, he followed Polk to Saint Louis. In 1971, he became an assistant under former Kentucky Wesleyan coach T. L. Plain at Utah State.

Bibb was an assistant at Mercer during the 1973–74 season. During the offseason, head coach Joe Dan Gold resigned to "pursue a business opportunity" and Bibb was chosen to succeed him. In fifteen seasons under Bibb, Mercer had a 222–194 record and made two appearances in the NCAA Division I men's basketball tournament. He is the winningest coach in the program's history. He was twice named Trans America Athletic Conference men's basketball coach of the year. Eight of his players were selected in the NBA Draft and one of them, Sam Mitchell, had a thirteen-year career in the National Basketball Association.

== Administration ==
From 1980 to 1989, Bibb was Mercer's director of athletics. He retired from coaching in 1989 and took the athletic director's job at UT Arlington. In 1991, he became commissioner of the Trans America Athletic Conference. He oversaw the merger of the TAAC and the New South Women's Athletic Conference in 1991 and its renaming to the Atlantic Sun Conference in 2001. Under his leadership, the conference grew from an all-men's conference sponsoring six sports to a men's and women's league that sponsored seventeen. He retired on December 31, 2006.

== Death ==
Bibb died on July 9, 2020. A memorial service was held at Mercer's Hawkins Arena.
