= Don Coleman Coliseum =

Indoor arena in Houston, Texas

Coordinates: 29°46′35″N 95°36′15″W

The Don Coleman Coliseum is an indoor arena operated by the Spring Branch Independent School District and located in Houston, Texas, United States.

== History ==
Completed in 1974 at a cost of $1.3 million, the facility seats 5,000 for events that have included high school sports, a visit by Gerald Ford in 1976, and the 1984 Trans-America Athletic Conference men's basketball tournament.

Originally christened the Spring Branch Community Coliseum, it was renamed in 1992 for local basketball coaching icon Don Coleman. He was the coach of nearby Memorial High School boys basketball for 37 years.

It has served as the place for graduates in the Spring Branch Independent School District to graduate each year, instead of Reliant Stadium as used by other schools in the Harris County area.
