= Kevin Tiggs =

American basketball player (born 1984)

Personal information
- Born: April 17, 1984 (age 42) Flint, Michigan
- Listed height: 196 cm (6 ft 5 in)
- Listed weight: 95 kg (209 lb)

Career information
- High school: Flint Northern (Flint, Michigan)
- College: Mott CC (2005–2007); East Tennessee State (2007–2009)
- NBA draft: 2009: undrafted
- Playing career: 2009–2017
- Position: Shooting guard / small forward

Career history
- 2009–2010: BC Ferro-ZNTU
- 2010–2011: APOEL B.C.
- 2011–2012: BC Goverla
- 2012: JDA Dijon Basket
- 2013: BC Goverla
- 2013–2014: Wollongong Hawks
- 2014–2015: Namika Lahti
- 2015–2016: Soproni KC
- 2016–2017: Crailsheim Merlins

Career highlights
- NBL Best Sixth Man (2014); Ukrainian Superleague All-Star (2010); Ukrainian Cup champion (2010); First-team All-Atlantic Sun (2009); Second-team All-Atlantic Sun (2008); NJCAA champion (2007)

Kevin Jerome Tiggs (born April 17, 1984) is an American former professional basketball player. He played college basketball for Mott Community College and East Tennessee State University.

== College career ==
As a freshman at Mott Community College in 2005–06, Tiggs played in 30 games for the Bears, averaging 10.9 points, 6.7 rebounds, 1.4 assists and 2.0 steals per game.

As a sophomore in 2006–07, Tiggs was named the NJCAA Coaches Association Division II National Player of the Year and helped the Bears win the NJCAA championship, finishing the year with a 35–3 record. In 33 games, he averaged 18.8 points, 7.2 rebounds and 3.2 steals per game.

In June 2007, Tiggs transferred to East Tennessee State University. As a junior playing for the Buccaneers in 2007–08, he earned second-team All-Atlantic Sun honors and was twice named A-Sun Player of the Week. In 32 games, he averaged 14.6 points, 5.5 rebounds, 1.6 assists and 1.5 steals per game.

As a senior in 2008–09, Tiggs earned first-team All-Atlantic Sun honors. In 34 games, he averaged 21.4 points, 4.8 rebounds, 2.0 assists and 2.1 steals per game.

== Professional career ==
In August 2009, Tiggs signed with BC Ferro-ZNTU of Ukraine for the 2009–10 season. In 34 games for the club, he averaged 15.0 points, 4.4 rebounds, 2.4 assists and 1.8 steals per game.

In June 2010, Tiggs re-signed with Ferro-ZNTU for the 2010–11 season. In October 2010, he left Ferro-ZNTU after appearing in seven games and signed with APOEL B.C. of Cyprus for the rest of the season. In 12 league games for APOEL, he averaged 14.3 points, 4.4 rebounds, 1.8 assists and 2.5 steals per game.

Tiggs returned to Ukraine for the 2011–12 season, signing with BC Hoverla. In 42 games for the club, he averaged 14.2 points, 4.0 rebounds, 1.9 assists and 1.6 steals per game.

In July 2012, Tiggs signed with JDA Dijon Basket of France for the 2012–13 season. In November 2012, he was released by Dijon after appearing in eight games. In February 2013, he re-signed with BC Govela for the rest of the season. In 18 games for Govela, he averaged 10.1 points, 4.3 rebounds, 1.5 assists and 1.5 steals per game.

On October 13, 2013, Tiggs signed with the Wollongong Hawks for the rest of the 2013–14 NBL season. On February 19, 2014, he underwent surgery on his right knee. The injury kept him out of action for three games, as he returned to the court on March 14. In 26 games for the Hawks in 2013–14, he averaged 14.5 points, 3.3 rebounds, 1.7 assists and 1.0 steals per game. He subsequently earned the NBL Best Sixth Man Award.

On November 1, 2014, Tiggs was selected by the Westchester Knicks in the seventh round of the 2014 NBA Development League Draft. He was later waived by the Knicks on November 11 prior to the start of the regular season. On December 16, 2014, he signed with Namika Lahti of the Finnish Korisliiga as a replacement for the injured Cameron Bennerman. He played out the rest of the season with Namika, and in 30 games, he averaged 15.3 points, 4.3 rebounds, 2.8 assists and 1.7 steals per game.

On October 6, 2015, Tiggs signed with Soproni KC of Hungary for the 2015–16 season. In 36 league games, he averaged 13.3 points, 4.8 rebounds, 2.8 assists and 2.2 steals per game.

On December 2, 2016, Tiggs signed with the Crailsheim Merlins of the German ProA. In 21 games, he averaged 13.6 points, 4.0 rebounds, 2.1 assists and 1.8 steals per game.
