= Houston Christian Huskies men's basketball =

2026–27 Houston Christian Huskies men's basketball team
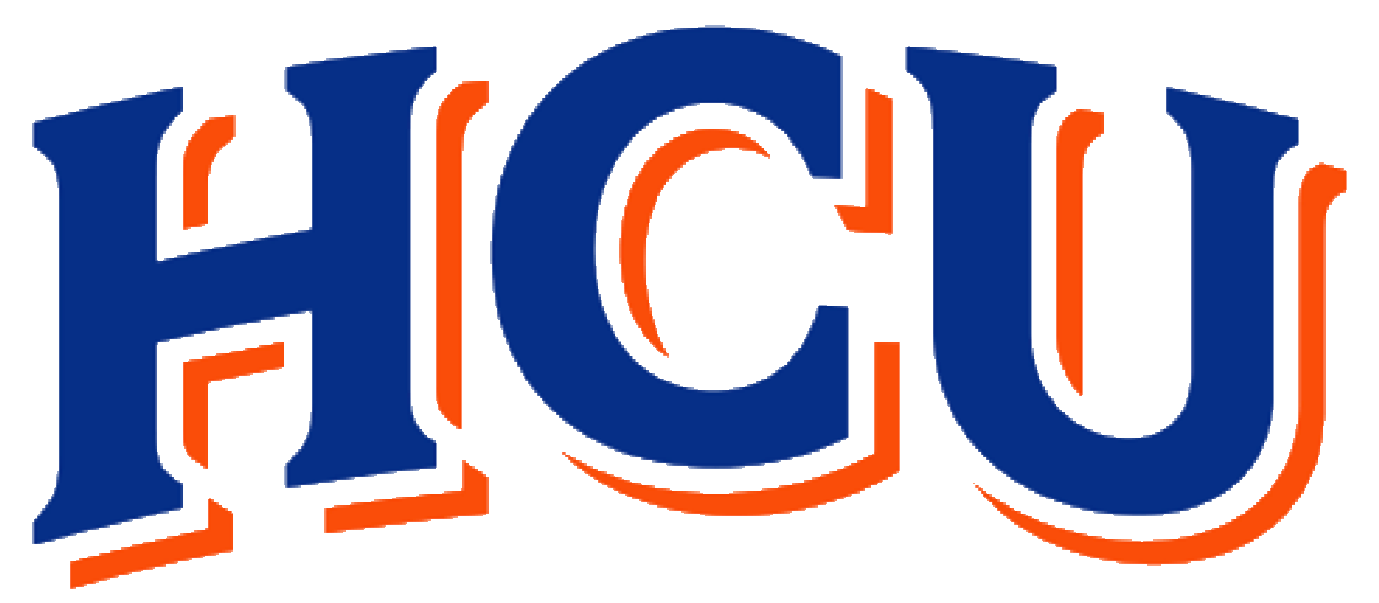
- University: Houston Christian University
- Head coach: Craig Doty (3rd season)
- Location: Houston, Texas
- Arena: Sharp Gymnasium (capacity: 1,000)
- Conference: Southland
- Nickname: Huskies
- Colors: Royal blue and orange

NCAA Division I tournament appearances
- 1984

Conference tournament champions
- TAAC/A-Sun: 1984

Conference regular-season champions
- TAAC/A-Sun: 1981, 1984

Uniforms
Home	Away

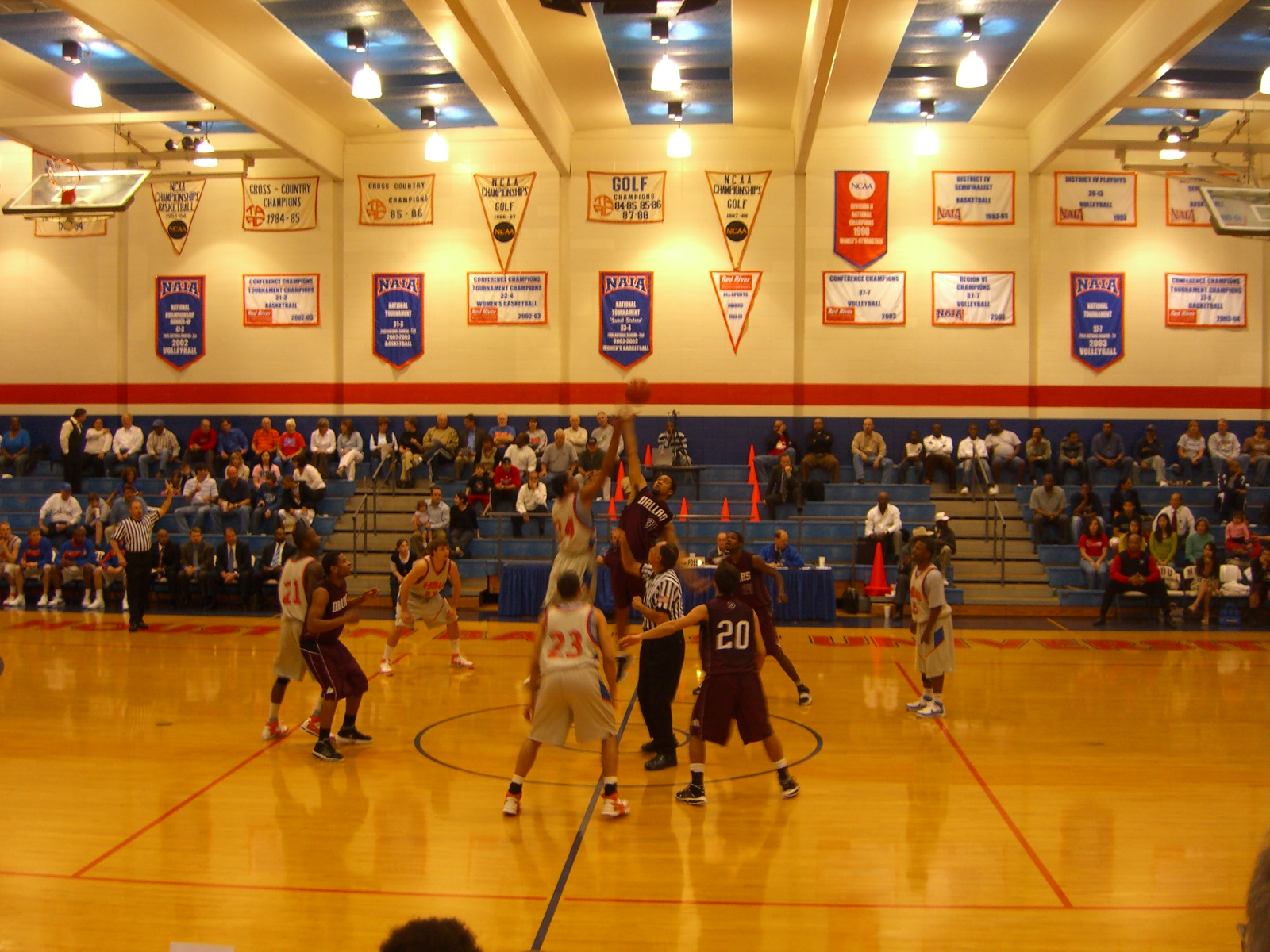
A jump ball begins a game at Sharp Gymnasium on February 18, 2008 between the Houston Baptist Huskies and Dallas Christian Crusaders.

The Houston Christian Huskies men's basketball team, known as the Houston Baptist Huskies until 2022, represents Houston Christian University in Houston, Texas, in NCAA Division I men's basketball competition. The team is coached by Craig Doty, who was hired on March 15, 2024. The Huskies have appeared once in the NCAA Division I men's basketball tournament in 1984.

The Huskies competed as members of the Trans America Athletic Conference from 1978 to 1989. After their departure from the TAAC, the Huskies went on a two-year hiatus before returning to the NAIA. HBU competed in the NAIA from 1991 to 2008. They returned to NCAA Division I for the 2008–2009 season, where they were initially an independent, followed by membership in the Great West Conference from 2009 through 2013. They moved to the Southland Conference in the 2013–14 season.

== History ==
First year of play: 1963 • All-time record entering 2009–10 season: 673–581 (.537)
Season	Overall record	Head coach	Notes
1963–64	1–7	Peck Vass	Competed as Houston Baptist College
1964–65	8–17	Peck Vass	Competed as Houston Baptist College
1965–66	9–12	Peck Vass	Competed as Houston Baptist College
1966–67	4–20	Peck Vass	Competed as Houston Baptist College
1967–68	6–20	Gerald Myers	
1968–69	16–12	Gerald Myers	
1969–70	10–11	Gerald Myers	
1970–71	15–11	Lonnie Richards	
1971–72	11–14	Lonnie Richards	
1972–73	10–13	Lonnie Richards	
1973–74	6–19	Lonnie Richards	
1974–75	9–17	Lonnie Richards	
1975–76	5–21	Bob McKinley	
1976–77	6–23	Bob McKinley	
1977–78	7–19	Gene Iba	
1978–79	11–16	Gene Iba	First year in the Trans American Athletic Conference
1979–80	14–13	Gene Iba	
1980–81	18–10	Gene Iba	
1981–82	13–14	Gene Iba	
1982–83	20–9	Gene Iba	
1983–84	24–7	Gene Iba	Trans American Athletic Conference Tournament Champions (3-0); 1984 NCAA tournament (Opening Round)
1984–85	21–8	Gene Iba	
1985–86	14–14	Tommy Jones	
1986–87	18–11	Tommy Jones	
1987–88	9–18	Tommy Jones	
1988–89	9–20	Tommy Jones	
1989–90			Did not compete
1990–91			Did not compete
1991–92	7–23	Ron Cottrell	
1992–93	14–19	Ron Cottrell	
1993–94	17–16	Ron Cottrell	
1994–95	21–13	Ron Cottrell	
1995–96	16–14	Ron Cottrell	
1996–97	17–15	Ron Cottrell	
1997–98	26–6	Ron Cottrell	1998 NAIA tournament (first round)
1998–99	25–10	Ron Cottrell	1999 NAIA tournament (first round)
1999–00	28–6	Ron Cottrell	2000 NAIA tournament (second round)
2000–01	31–5	Ron Cottrell	2001 NAIA tournament (first round)
2001–02	26–9	Ron Cottrell	2002 NAIA tournament (first round)
2002–03	31–3	Ron Cottrell	2003 NAIA tournament (first round)
2003–04	27–6	Ron Cottrell	2004 NAIA tournament (first round)
2004–05	23–10	Ron Cottrell	2005 NAIA tournament (first round)
2005–06	27–6	Ron Cottrell	2006 NAIA tournament (second round)
2006–07	22–7	Ron Cottrell	2007 NAIA tournament (second round)
2007–08	13–15	Ron Cottrell	Return to Division 1 as an Independent
2008–09	5–25	Ron Cottrell	
2009–10	12–21(GWC:9-3)	Ron Cottrell	First year in the Great West Conference; Great West Conference tournament(runner-up) (2-1)
2010–11	5–26(GWC:2-10)	Ron Cottrell	Great West Conference tournament (semifinals) (1-1)
2011–12	10–20(GWC:3-7)	Ron Cottrell	Great West Conference tournament (quarterfinals) (0-1)
2012–13	14–17(GWC:3-5)	Ron Cottrell	Great West Conference tournament (runner-up) (2-1)
2013–14	6–25(SLC:2–16)	Ron Cottrell	First year in the Southland Conference
2014–15	12–16(SLC:7–11)	Ron Cottrell	
2015–16	17–17(SLC:10–8)	Ron Cottrell	Southland Conference tournament (semifinals) (1-1); CBI tournament (1st Round) (0-1)
2016–17	17–14(SLC:12–6)	Ron Cottrell	Southland Conference tournament (quarterfinals) (0-1); CIT tournament (1st Round) (0-1)
2017–18	6–25(SLC:2–16)	Ron Cottrell	
2018–19	12–18(SLC:8–10)	Ron Cottrell	Southland Conference tournament (first round) (0-1)
2019–20	4–25(SLC:4–16)	Ron Cottrell	
2020–21	6–19(SLC:4–11)	Ron Cottrell	Southland Conference tournament (second round) (1-1)
2021–22	11–18(SLC:6–8)	Ron Cottrell	Southland Conference tournament (quarterfinals) (1-1)
2022–23	10–22(SLC:7–11)	Ron Cottrell	Southland Conference tournament (first round) (0-1)
2023–24	6–23(SLC:4–14)	Ron Cottrell	
2024–25	12–20 (SLC: 9–11)	Craig Doty	Southland Conference tournament (first round) (0-1)

== Postseason results ==
=== NCAA tournament results ===
Houston Christian has been to the NCAA tournament once. Its record is 0–1.

Year	Seed	Round	Opponent	Result
1984	#12	Preliminary Round	#12 Alcorn State	L 60–79

=== CBI results ===
Houston Christian has appeared in one College Basketball Invitational (CBI). Its record is 0–1.

Year	Round	Opponent	Result
2016	First Round	UNC Greensboro	L 65–69

=== CIT results ===
Houston Christian has appeared in one CollegeInsider.com Postseason Tournament (CIT). Its record is 0–1.

Year	Round	Opponent	Result
2017	First Round	Campbell	L 79–98

=== NAIA results ===
Houston Christian has appeared in the NAIA Division I tournament 10 times. Their combined record is 3–10.

Year	Round	Opponent	Result
1998	First Round	Montana State–Northern	L 67–83
1999	First Round	Oklahoma City	L 61–85
2000	First Round; Second Round	Barber–Scotia; The Master's	W 68–50; L 61–81
2001	First Round	Martin Methodist	L 66–67
2002	First Round	Oklahoma City	L 82–88
2003	First Round	Dillard	L 76–79
2004	First Round	John Brown	L 64–72
2005	First Round	Azusa Pacific	L 72–88
2006	First Round; Second Round	Westminster (UT); Oklahoma City	W 73–64; L 77–99
2007	First Round; Second Round	Campbellsville; Concordia (CA)	W 80–55; L 72–83

== Notable players ==
- E. C. Coleman (1969–73)
- Anicet Lavodrama (1981–85)
- Joshua Ibarra (2014-18)
