= Samford Bulldogs men's basketball =

American college basketball team

Samford Bulldogs
2026–27 Samford Bulldogs men's basketball team
- University: Samford University
- Head coach: Lennie Acuff (1st season)
- Location: Homewood, Alabama
- Arena: Pete Hanna Center (capacity: 4,954)
- Conference: SoCon
- Nickname: Bulldogs
- Colors: Blue and red

NCAA Division I tournament appearances
- 1999, 2000, 2024

Conference tournament champions
- TAAC/A-Sun: 1999, 2000; SoCon: 2024

Conference regular-season champions
- TAAC/A-Sun: 1996, 1997, 1999; SoCon: 2023, 2024

Uniforms
Home	Away

The Samford Bulldogs men's basketball team is the basketball team that represents Samford University in Homewood, Alabama, United States. The school's team currently competes in the Southern Conference. They are currently led by head coach Lennie Acuff and play their home games at the Pete Hanna Center. The Bulldogs have appeared three times in the NCAA tournament, most recently in 2024.

== History ==
Samford University has sponsored a men's basketball team since 1901. They have been NCAA Division I since 1972 as an independent, in the Trans-Atlantic Athletic Conference (now ASUN Conference), the Ohio Valley Conference, and presently the Southern Conference.

=== John Brady Era (1991–1997) ===
John Brady was the head men's basketball coach at Samford from the 1991–92 season through the 1996–97 season. While coaching at Samford, he led the program to back-to-back Trans America Athletic Conference West Division titles in 1996 and 1997. His record during his years at Samford was 89–77. He left Samford to become the head coach at LSU in 1997. He stayed with the Tigers until 2008, leading the program to SEC regular-season titles in 2000 and 2006, earning SEC Coach of the Year honors both years. He coached LSU to four NCAA Tournament appearances, reaching the Sweet 16 in 2000 and the Final Four in 2006. Following his years at LSU, Brady was the head coach at Arkansas State from 2008–16, winning a pair of Sun Belt West Division titles. He retired from coaching with a career record of 402–344.

=== Jimmy Tillette Era (1997–2012) ===
Jimmy Tillette was the head men’s basketball coach at Samford from 1997 to 2012. He led the program to back-to-back Trans America Athletic Conference (TAAC) Tournament titles and NCAA Tournament bids in 1999 and 2000. In his years in charge of the Samford program, Tillette won a school-record 229 games. His 1998–99 team won a school-record 24 games, going 24–6, winning the TAAC regular season and TAAC Tournament titles and earning the program’s first NCAA Tournament bid. For his efforts, Tillette was named the 1999 TAAC Coach of the Year. The following season, the team went 21–11, winning the TAAC Tournament and reaching the NCAA Tournament for a second-straight year. The 1999–2000 team also claimed impressive wins over Alabama and St. John’s. Tillette’s 2005–06 team posted a record of 20–11, reaching the finals of the Ohio Valley Conference Tournament.

=== Bennie Seltzer Era (2012–2014) ===
Bennie Seltzer was the head men's basketball coach at Samford from 2012 to 2014. He led the program to a 24–41 record over his two seasons at the helm.

=== Scott Padgett Era (2014–2020) ===
Scott Padgett was the head men's basketball coach at Samford from 2014 to 2020. He led the program to a 84–115 record during his time at the University. The Bulldogs reached postseason play in 2017 as the team participated in the CollegeInsider.com Postseason Tournament (CIT).

=== Bucky McMillan Era (2020–2025) ===
In just four seasons, McMillan has transformed the Samford program into one of the top programs in the prestigious Southern Conference. The 2023–24 season was the best in program history. The team set a school record with 29 wins, posting a 29–6 final record, marking the third-straight season of winning at least 20 games. The team won the Southern Conference regular-season title for a second-straight year with a 15–3 league mark, and the Bulldogs won the SoCon Tournament for the first time and earned a bid to the NCAA Tournament for the first time since 2000. In the NCAA Tournament, the Bulldogs narrowly lost to perennial national power Kansas.

McMillan was named the SoCon Coach of the Year three straight seasons from 2022 to 2024. He was also named the National Association of Basketball Coaches (NABC) Region 21 Coach of the Year for the 2023–2024 season.

On April 5, 2025, McMillan left Samford after 5 seasons to become head coach at Texas A&M.

=== Lennie Acuff Era (2025–Present) ===
On April 9, 2025, Samford University announced the hiring of Lennie Acuff to be its next head basketball coach. Acuff departed Lipscomb University, where he accumulated an overall record of 110-82 over six seasons in Nashville and made one NCAA tournament appearance (2025). Prior to Lipscomb, Acuff headed several NAIA and NCAA-Division II programs from 1990–2019.

== Postseason ==
=== NCAA Division I Tournament results ===
The Bulldogs have appeared three times in the NCAA Division I tournament. Their combined record is 0–3.

Year	Seed	Round	Opponent	Result
1999	#14	First Round	#3 St. John's	L 43–69
2000	#13	First Round	#4 Syracuse	L 65–79
2024	#13	First Round	#4 Kansas	L 89–93

=== NIT results ===
The Bulldogs have appeared in the National Invitation Tournament (NIT) once. Their record is 0–1.

Year	Round	Opponent	Result
2025	First Round	George Mason	L 69–86

=== CIT results ===
The Bulldogs have appeared in one CollegeInsider.com Postseason Tournament (CIT). Their record is 1–1.

Year	Round	Opponent	Result
2017	First Round; Second Round	Canisius; Liberty	W 78–74; L 58–66
