= List of North Florida Ospreys men's basketball head coaches =

The following is a list of North Florida Ospreys men's basketball head coaches. There have been four head coaches of the Ospreys in their 32-season history.

North Florida's current head coach is Matthew Driscoll. He was hired as the Ospreys' head coach in April 2009, replacing Matt Kilcullen, who was fired after the 2008–09 season.

No.	Tenure	Coach	Years	Record	Pct.
1	1991–1997	Rich Zvosec	6	54–84	.391
2	1997–1999	Sidney Green	2	20–33	.377
3	1999–2009	Matt Kilcullen	10	98–186	.345
4	2009–present	Matthew Driscoll	14	217–231	.484
Totals		4 coaches	32 seasons	389–534	.421
Records updated through end of 2022–23 season Source
