= 2010–11 Furman Paladins men's basketball team =

American college basketball season

2010–11 Furman Paladins men's basketball
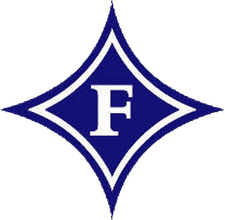

CIT, First Round
- Conference: Southern Conference
- South
- Record: 22–11 (12–6 SoCon)
- Head coach: Jeff Jackson (5th season)
- Associate head coach: James Strong (1st season)
- Assistant coaches: David Willson (2nd season); Blake Williams (1st season)
- Home arena: Timmons Arena

2010–11 Southern Conference men's basketball standings
	Conf.				Overall
Team	W		L	PCT	W		L	PCT
North
Western Carolina	12	–	6	.667	18	–	15	.545
Chattanooga	12	–	6	.667	16	–	16	.500
Appalachian State	10	–	8	.556	16	–	15	.516
Elon	7	–	11	.389	14	–	17	.452
UNC Greensboro	6	–	12	.333	7	–	24	.226
Samford	4	–	14	.222	12	–	19	.387
South
College of Charleston	14	–	4	.778	25	–	10	.714
Wofford†	14	–	4	.778	21	–	13	.618
Furman	12	–	6	.667	22	–	11	.667
Davidson	10	–	8	.556	18	–	15	.545
The Citadel	6	–	12	.333	10	–	22	.313
Georgia Southern	1	–	17	.056	5	–	27	.156
† SoCon Tournament winner As of March 31, 2011; Rankings from AP Poll

The 2010–11 Furman Paladins men's basketball team represented Furman University in the 2010–11 NCAA Division I men's basketball season. The Paladins, led by head coach James Jackson, played their home games at Timmons Arena in Greenville, South Carolina, as members of the Southern Conference. The Paladins finished 3rd in the SoCon Southern Division during the regular season, and lost in the semifinals of the Southern Conference tournament to College of Charleston.

Furman failed to qualify for the NCAA tournament, but were invited to the 2011 CIT. The Paladins were eliminated in the first round of the tournament, losing to East Tennessee State, 76–63.

== Roster ==
2010–11 Furman Paladins men's basketball team
Players
Coaches

Pos.	#	Name	Height	Weight	Year	Hometown
G	0	Garrett Copeland	6 ft 2 in (1.88 m)	—	Jr	Fort Mill, South Carolina
G	1	Justin Dehm	6 ft 1 in (1.85 m)	—	Sr	Peoria, Illinois
F	2	Neil Duval	6 ft 8 in (2.03 m)	—	Jr	Southlake, Texas
G	3	Richard Brown	5 ft 11 in (1.8 m)	—	Fr	Charlotte, North Carolina
F	4	Noah States	6 ft 8 in (2.03 m)	—	Sr	Troutville, Virginia
G	5	Darryl Evans	6 ft 1 in (1.85 m)	—	Sr	Spartanburg, South Carolina
G	11	Jordan Miller	6 ft 2 in (1.88 m)	—	Sr	Memphis, Tennessee
G	12	Charlie Reddick	6 ft 5 in (1.96 m)	—	RS Fr	Powder Springs, Georgia
F	15	Bryant Irwin	6 ft 7 in (2.01 m)	—	Jr	Bridgeport, West Virginia
G	20	Graham Rogers	5 ft 11 in (1.8 m)	—	Fr	Greer, South Carolina
G	22	Bobby Austin	6 ft 3 in (1.91 m)	—	Jr	Cincinnati, Ohio
F	24	Brandon Sebirumbi	6 ft 9 in (2.06 m)	—	Jr	Keller, Texas
F	31	Amu Saaka	6 ft 6 in (1.98 m)	—	Sr	Decatur, Georgia
F	32	Bryson Barnes	6 ft 6 in (1.98 m)	—	Jr	Atlanta, Georgia
F	43	Colin Reddick	6 ft 9 in (2.06 m)	—	So	Powder Springs, Georgia
F	44	Chris Toler	6 ft 9 in (2.06 m)	—	Jr	Indianapolis, Indiana

Head coach

- Jeff Jackson (Cornell)

Assistant coach(es)

- James Strong (Vanderbilt)
- David Willson (Hampden–Sydney)
- Blake Williams (Florida Southern)

Legend

- (C) Team captain
- (S) Suspended
- (I) Ineligible
- (W) Walk-on
- Injured
- Current redshirt

Roster
Last update: January 18, 2023

== Schedule and results ==
Date time, TV	Rank^{#}	Opponent^{#}	Result	Record	Site (attendance) city, state
Exhibition
November 5, 2010*; 7:00 pm		Emory	W 74–49	—	Timmons Arena; Greenville, SC
Regular season
November 12, 2010*; 7:00 pm		North Greenville	W 72–54	1–0	Timmons Arena (2,289); Greenville, SC
November 16, 2010*; 7:00 pm		UNC Asheville	W 69–67	2–0	Timmons Arena (1,705); Greenville, SC
November 19, 2010*; 7:00 pm		at Kent State	L 74–78 ^{OT}	2–1	MAC Center (3,423); Kent, OH
November 23, 2010*; 7:30 pm		at South Carolina State	W 59–55	3–1	SHM Memorial Center (444); Orangeburg, SC
November 28, 2010*; 3:30 pm, BTN		at Penn State	L 49–70	3–2	Bryce Jordan Center (5,181); University Park, PA
December 1, 2010; 7:00 pm		Elon	W 80–65	4–2 (1–0)	Timmons Arena (1,643); Greenville, SC
December 6, 2010; 7:00 pm		UNC Greensboro	W 81–68	5–2 (2–0)	Timmons Arena (1,643); Greenville, SC
December 12, 2010*; 4:00 pm, ESPN3.com		at Middle Tennessee	W 76–61	6–2	Murphy Center (3,806); Murfreesboro, TN
December 18, 2010*; 7:00 pm		at North Florida	W 60–49	7–2	UNF Arena (804); Jacksonville, FL
December 22, 2010*; 7:00 pm		South Carolina	W 91–75	8–2	Timmons Arena (2,717); Greenville, SC
December 29, 2010*; 7:00 pm		at No. 19 UCF; UCF Holiday Classic	L 53–71	8–3	UCF Arena (7,111); Orlando, FL
December 30, 2010*; 5:00 pm		vs. Northeastern; UCF Holiday Classic	W 75–62	9–3	UCF Arena (5,591); Orlando, FL
January 3, 2011*; 7:00 pm		UVA Wise	W 82–55	10–3	Timmons Arena (802); Greenville, SC
January 6, 2011; 7:00 pm		College of Charleston	L 72–76	10–4 (2–1)	Timmons Arena (2,078); Greenville, SC
January 8, 2011; 4:00 pm		The Citadel	W 88–67	11–4 (3–1)	Timmons Arena (1,862); Greenville, SC
January 12, 2011; 7:00 pm		at Davidson	L 70–79	11–5 (3–2)	John M. Belk Arena (3,404); Davidson, NC
January 15, 2011; 2:00 pm		at Georgia Southern	W 74–56	12–5 (4–2)	Hanner Fieldhouse (1,416); Statesboro, GA
January 20, 2011; 7:00 pm		Samford	W 74–55	13–5 (5–2)	Timmons Arena (1,504); Greenville, SC
January 22, 2011; 4:00 pm		Chattanooga	W 85–59	14–5 (6–2)	Timmons Arena (2,646); Greenville, SC
January 24, 2011; 7:00 pm		at Wofford	W 73–68 ^{OT}	15–5 (7–2)	Benjamin Johnson Arena (2,594); Spartanburg, SC
January 27, 2011; 7:00 pm		at Western Carolina	L 41–65	15–6 (7–3)	Ramsey Center (2,083); Cullowhee, NC
January 29, 2011; 4:00 pm		Appalachian State	W 81–61	16–6 (8–3)	Timmons Arena (2,135); Greenville, SC
February 3, 2011; 7:05 pm		at The Citadel	W 59–55	17–6 (9–3)	McAlister Field House (2,289); Charleston, SC
February 5, 2011; 7:00 pm, CSS		at College of Charleston	L 54–73	17–7 (9–4)	Carolina First Arena (5,081); Charleston, SC
February 10, 2011; 7:00 pm		Georgia Southern	W 54–45	18–7 (10–4)	Timmons Arena (1,561); Greenville, SC
February 12, 2011; 6:00 pm, CSS		Davidson	W 88–79	19–7 (11–4)	Timmons Arena (2,782); Greenville, SC
February 19, 2011; 5:00 pm		at Samford	W 70–63	20–7 (12–4)	Pete Hanna Center (535); Homewood, AL
February 21, 2011; 7:00 pm		Chattanooga	L 59–75	20–8 (12–5)	McKenzie Arena (5,107); Chattanooga, TN
February 26, 2011; 2:00 pm, SportSouth		Wofford	L 65–79	20–9 (12–6)	Timmons Arena (2,802); Greenville, SC
SoCon tournament
March 4, 2011; 7:00 pm	(S3)	vs. (N6) Samford; SoCon First Round	W 61–48	21–9	McKenzie Arena (2,967); Chattanooga, TN
March 5, 2011; 7:00 pm	(S3)	at (N2) Chattanooga; SoCon Quarterfinals	W 61–52	22–9	McKenzie Arena (5,597); Chattanooga, TN
March 6, 2011; 8:30 pm	(S3)	vs. (S1) College of Charleston; SoCon Semifinals	L 58–63	22–10	McKenzie Arena (3,510); Chattanooga, TN
CollegeInsider.com tournament
March 15, 2011; 7:00 pm		at East Tennessee State; CIT First Round	L 63–76	22–11	ETSU/MSHA Athletic Center (2,019); Johnson City, TN
*Non-conference game. ^{#}Rankings from AP Poll. (#) Tournament seedings in parentheses. All times are in Eastern Time.
