= 2010–11 East Tennessee State Buccaneers men's basketball team =

American college basketball season

2010–11 East Tennessee State Buccaneers men's basketball

CIT, Semifinals
- Conference: Atlantic Sun Conference
- Record: 23–11 (16–4 A-Sun)
- Head coach: Murry Bartow (8th season)
- Assistant coaches: Scott Wagers (11th season); Mike Boyd (8th season); Thomas Johnson (1st season)
- Home arena: ETSU/Mountain States Health Alliance Athletic Center

2010–11 Atlantic Sun men's basketball standings
	Conf.				Overall
Team	W		L	PCT	W		L	PCT
† Belmont	19	–	1	.950	30	–	5	.857
East Tennessee State	16	–	4	.800	24	–	12	.667
Jacksonville	13	–	7	.650	20	–	12	.625
Lipscomb	12	–	8	.600	17	–	13	.567
Mercer	11	–	9	.550	15	–	18	.455
North Florida	10	–	10	.500	15	–	19	.441
Florida Gulf Coast	7	–	13	.350	10	–	20	.333
Campbell	6	–	14	.300	12	–	19	.387
Kennesaw State	6	–	14	.300	8	–	23	.258
Stetson	6	–	14	.300	8	–	23	.258
USC Upstate	4	–	16	.200	5	–	25	.167
† 2011 Atlantic Sun Tournament winner Rankings from AP Poll

The 2010–11 East Tennessee State Buccaneers men's basketball team represented East Tennessee State University in the 2010–11 NCAA Division I men's basketball season. The Buccaneers, led by head coach Murry Bartow, played their home games at ETSU/Mountain States Health Alliance Athletic Center in Johnson City, Tennessee, as members of the Atlantic Sun Conference. The Buccaneers finished 2nd in the Atlantic Sun during the regular season, but lost in the second round of the Atlantic Sun tournament after being upset by sixth-seeded North Florida.

East Tennessee State failed to qualify for the NCAA tournament, but were invited to the 2011 CIT. The Buccaneers advanced to the semifinals of the CIT, where they were eliminated by Iona, 85–74.

== Roster ==
2010–11 East Tennessee State Buccaneers men's basketball team
Players
Coaches

Pos.	#	Name	Height	Weight	Year	Hometown
G	0	Ryan Woumn	6 ft 3 in (1.91 m)	170 lb (77 kg)	Fr	Lynn, Massachusetts
G	1	Mike Smith	6 ft 6 in (1.98 m)	225 lb (102 kg)	Sr	Vandalia, Missouri
G	3	Justin Tubbs	6 ft 3 in (1.91 m)	205 lb (93 kg)	Sr	Trussville, Alabama
G	5	Sheldon Cooley	6 ft 3 in (1.91 m)	180 lb (82 kg)	So	Tampa, Florida
G	10	De'Shaud Johnson	5 ft 9 in (1.75 m)	165 lb (75 kg)	Sr	Riverdale, Georgia
G	13	Tommy Hubbard	6 ft 4 in (1.93 m)	210 lb (95 kg)	Sr	Boston, Massachusetts
F	15	Anthony Johnson	6 ft 7 in (2.01 m)	235 lb (107 kg)	Jr	Los Angeles, California
G	25	Jarvis Jones	6 ft 2 in (1.88 m)	190 lb (86 kg)	Jr	Memphis, Tennessee
G	30	Micah Williams	6 ft 4 in (1.93 m)	220 lb (100 kg)	Sr	Manchester, Tennessee
F	34	Lukas Poderis	6 ft 8 in (2.03 m)	230 lb (104 kg)	So	Port Richey, Florida
F	41	Isiah Brown	6 ft 8 in (2.03 m)	210 lb (95 kg)	Jr	Miami, Florida
G	43	Adam Sollazzo	6 ft 6 in (1.98 m)	200 lb (91 kg)	Jr	Tampa, Florida
F	44	J. C. Ward	6 ft 6 in (1.98 m)	245 lb (111 kg)	So	Marietta, Georgia
F	45	Curtis Wilkinson	6 ft 8 in (2.03 m)	220 lb (100 kg)	Jr	Bude, Mississippi
F	52	Josh Johnson	6 ft 10 in (2.08 m)	210 lb (95 kg)	Fr	Gate City, Virginia

Head coach

- Murry Bartow (UAB)

Assistant coach(es)

- Scott Wagers (Tennessee Wesleyan)
- Mike Boyd (Northern Michigan)
- Thomas Johnson (Montevallo)

Legend

- (C) Team captain
- (S) Suspended
- (I) Ineligible
- (W) Walk-on
- Injured
- Current redshirt

Roster
Last update: January 17, 2023

== Schedule and results ==
Date time, TV	Rank^{#}	Opponent^{#}	Result	Record	Site (attendance) city, state
Exhibition
November 2, 2010*		Carson–Newman	W 96–61	—	ETSU/MSHA Athletic Center; Johnson City, TN
November 8, 2010*		Tusculum	W 78–41	—	ETSU/MSHA Athletic Center; Johnson City, TN
Regular season
November 12, 2010*; 7:00 pm		at No. 11 Kentucky	L 65–88	0–1	Rupp Arena (23,740); Lexington, KY
November 15, 2010*; 8:15 pm		at Murray State	L 39–50	0–2	CFSB Center (4,883); Murray, KY
November 20, 2010*; 4:00 pm		Tennessee Tech	W 73–60	1–2	ETSU/MSHA Athletic Center (4,105); Johnson City, TN
November 27, 2010*; 4:00 pm		Milligan	W 103–55	2–2	ETSU/MSHA Athletic Center (2,811); Johnson City, TN
December 1, 2010*; 7:00 pm		at Dayton	W 73–68	3–2	University of Dayton Arena (12,040); Dayton, OH
December 5, 2010; 2:00 pm		at USC Upstate	L 59–60	3–3 (0–1)	G. B. Hodge Center (957); Spartanburg, SC
December 7, 2010*; 7:00 pm		at College of Charleston	L 59–79	3–4	Carolina First Arena (3,137); Charleston, SC
December 11, 2010*; 8:00 pm		at Mississippi State	W 63–62	4–4	Humphrey Coliseum (3,382); Starkville, MS
December 18, 2010*; 4:00 pm		at Ole Miss	L 50–71	4–5	Tad Smith Coliseum (3,012); Oxford, MS
December 22, 2010*; 2:30 pm		vs. Southern Miss	L 60–64	4–6	Polifórum Benito Juárez (653); Cancún, Mexico
December 23, 2010*; 12:00 pm		vs. Northeastern	L 67–77	4–7	Polifórum Benito Juárez; Cancún, Mexico
December 24, 2010*; 1:00 pm		vs. Appalachian State	W 79–51	5–7	Polifórum Benito Juárez; Cancún, Mexico
December 30, 2010; 7:00 pm		Campbell	W 72–59	6–7 (1–1)	ETSU/MSHA Athletic Center (2,770); Johnson City, TN
January 3, 2011; 7:30 pm		at Mercer	W 62–61	7–7 (2–1)	University Center (1,286); Macon, GA
January 5, 2011; 7:30 pm		at Kennesaw State	W 80–69	8–7 (3–1)	KSU Convocation Center (915); Kennesaw, GA
January 8, 2011; 4:00 pm		Florida Gulf Coast	W 84–65	9–7 (4–1)	ETSU/MSHA Athletic Center (3,012); Johnson City, TN
January 10, 2011; 7:30 pm		Stetson	W 62–42	10–7 (5–1)	ETSU/MSHA Athletic Center (2,528); Johnson City, TN
January 13, 2011; 7:00 pm		at North Florida	W 66–61	11–7 (6–1)	UNF Arena (1,321); Jacksonville, FL
January 15, 2011; 3:30 pm		at Jacksonville	W 74–62	12–7 (7–1)	Jacksonville Veterans Memorial Arena (1,856); Jacksonville, FL
January 21, 2011; 7:00 pm		Lipscomb	W 68–67	13–7 (8–1)	ETSU/MSHA Athletic Center (3,859); Johnson City, TN
January 23, 2011; 4:00 pm		Belmont	L 62–72	13–8 (8–2)	ETSU/MSHA Athletic Center (4,299); Johnson City, TN
January 25, 2011; 7:00 pm		USC Upstate	W 67–52	14–8 (9–2)	ETSU/MSHA Athletic Center (3,002); Johnson City, TN
January 29, 2011; 4:00 pm		Kennesaw State	W 93–62	15–8 (10–2)	ETSU/MSHA Athletic Center (3,756); Johnson City, TN
January 31, 2011; 7:00 pm		Mercer	W 82–75	16–8 (11–2)	ETSU/MSHA Athletic Center (3,099); Johnson City, TN
February 4, 2011; 7:05 pm		at Florida Gulf Coast	W 66–59	17–8 (12–2)	Alico Arena (1,523); Fort Myers, FL
February 6, 2011; 3:00 pm		at Stetson	L 54–55	17–9 (12–3)	Edmunds Center; DeLand, FL
February 11, 2011; 7:05 pm		Jacksonville	W 80–64	18–9 (13–3)	ETSU/MSHA Athletic Center (3,890); Johnson City, TN
February 13, 2011; 4:10 pm		North Florida	W 80–57	19–9 (14–3)	ETSU/MSHA Athletic Center (3,417); Johnson City, TN
February 17, 2011; 8:00 pm		at Belmont	L 58–68	19–10 (14–4)	Curb Event Center (1,901); Nashville, TN
February 19, 2011; 7:30 pm		at Lipscomb	W 102–95 ^{2OT}	20–10 (15–4)	Allen Arena (2,506); Nashville, TN
February 24, 2011; 7:30 pm		at Campbell	W 66–59	21–10 (16–4)	John W. Pope Jr. Convocation Center (1,768); Buies Creek, NC
Atlantic Sun tournament
March 2, 2011; 9:00 pm	(2)	vs. (7) Campbell; A-Sun Quarterfinals	W 54–53	22–10	University Center (1,020); Macon, GA
March 4, 2011; 9:00 pm	(2)	vs. (6) North Florida; A-Sun Semifinals	L 55–59	22–11	University Center (2,488); Macon, GA
CollegeInsider.com tournament
March 15, 2011; 7:00 pm		Furman; CIT First Round	W 76–63	23–11	ETSU/MSHA Athletic Center (2,019); Johnson City, TN
March 22, 2011; 7:00 pm		Ohio; CIT Quarterfinals	W 82–73	24–11	ETSU/MSHA Athletic Center (2,203); Johnson City, TN
March 26, 2011; 2:00 pm		Iona; CIT Semifinals	L 80–83	24–12	ETSU/MSHA Athletic Center (2,540); Johnson City, TN
*Non-conference game. ^{#}Rankings from AP Poll. (#) Tournament seedings in parentheses. All times are in Eastern Time.
