= Bobby Kennen =

American basketball coach

Current position
- Title: Head coach
- Team: North Florida
- Conference: ASUN
- Record: 9–28 (.243)

Biographical details
- Born: Lakewood Township, New Jersey, U.S.
- Education: Palm Beach Atlantic University (1993); University of Florida (1998)

Playing career
- 1989–1993: Palm Beach Atlantic

Coaching career (HC unless noted)
- 1993–1995: Santaluces HS (assistant)
- 1995–1998: Williston HS
- 1998–1999: Central Florida CC (assistant)
- 1999–2000: Wichita State (assistant)
- 2000–2005: Jacksonville (assistant)
- 2005–2009: Campbell (assistant)
- 2009–2012: North Florida (assistant)
- 2012–2025: North Florida (associate HC)
- 2025–present: North Florida

Head coaching record
- Overall: 9–28 (.243) (college)

Robert Kennen is an American basketball coach. He is currently the head coach of the North Florida Ospreys men's basketball team.

== Career ==
Kennen played college basketball at Palm Beach Atlantic University. He began his coaching career at the high school level, first coaching as an assistant at Santaluces High School and later as the head coach at Williston High School. After serving as an assistant coach at Central Florida Community College, Wichita State, and Jacksonville, Kennen was named an assistant coach at Campbell in 2005. After four seasons at Campbell, he was hired as an assistant at North Florida. Kennen was promoted to associate head coach in 2012, a position he served until 2025.

On May 22, 2025, Kennen was named the interim head coach for North Florida, following the departure of Matthew Driscoll.

== Head coaching record ==
Record table
Season	Team	Overall	Conference	Standing	Postseason
North Florida Ospreys (ASUN Conference) (2025–present)
2025–26	North Florida	7–25	5–13	11th	
2026–27	North Florida	2–3	0–0		
North Florida:		9–28 (.243)	5–13 (.278)		
Total:		9–28 (.243)			
National champion Postseason invitational champion Conference regular season champion Conference regular season and conference tournament champion Division regular season champion Division regular season and conference tournament champion Conference tournament champion
