= 2010–11 Belmont Bruins men's basketball team =

American college basketball season

2010–11 Belmont Bruins men's basketball

Atlantic Sun regular season and tournament champions

NCAA tournament, Round of 64
- Conference: Atlantic Sun Conference
- Record: 30–5 (19–1 A Sun)
- Head coach: Rick Byrd
- Home arena: Curb Event Center

2010–11 Atlantic Sun men's basketball standings
	Conf.				Overall
Team	W		L	PCT	W		L	PCT
† Belmont	19	–	1	.950	30	–	5	.857
East Tennessee State	16	–	4	.800	24	–	12	.667
Jacksonville	13	–	7	.650	20	–	12	.625
Lipscomb	12	–	8	.600	17	–	13	.567
Mercer	11	–	9	.550	15	–	18	.455
North Florida	10	–	10	.500	15	–	19	.441
Florida Gulf Coast	7	–	13	.350	10	–	20	.333
Campbell	6	–	14	.300	12	–	19	.387
Kennesaw State	6	–	14	.300	8	–	23	.258
Stetson	6	–	14	.300	8	–	23	.258
USC Upstate	4	–	16	.200	5	–	25	.167
† 2011 Atlantic Sun Tournament winner Rankings from AP Poll

The 2010–11 Belmont Bruins men's basketball team represented Belmont University during the 2010–11 NCAA Division I men's basketball season. The Bruins, led by 25th year head coach Rick Byrd, played their home games at the Curb Event Center and are members of the Atlantic Sun Conference. They finished the season 30–5, 19–1 in A-Sun play to win the regular season conference championship. They also were champions of the 2011 Atlantic Sun men's basketball tournament to earn an automatic bid in the 2011 NCAA Division I men's basketball tournament where they were defeated in the first round by Wisconsin.

== Roster ==
Number	Name	Position	Height	Weight	Year	Hometown
1	Drew Hanlen	Guard	5–11	180	Junior	St. Louis, Missouri
2	Blake Jenkins	Forward	6–7	200	Freshman	Knoxville, Tennessee
3	Kerron Johnson	Guard	6–1	175	Sophomore	Huntsville, Alabama
4	Jonny Rice	Guard	6–1	165	Junior	Naperville, Illinois
5	Chad Lang	Center	6–11	275	Freshman	Marietta, Georgia
12	Holden Mobley	Guard/Forward	6–3	200	Freshman	Nashville, Tennessee
13	Jon House	Guard/Forward	6–6	215	Senior	Guelph, Ontario
14	J. J. Mann	Guard/Forward	6–6	210	Freshman	Smyrna, Georgia
21	Ian Clark	Guard	6–3	175	Sophomore	Memphis, Tennessee
22	Reece Chamberlain	Guard	6–1	175	Freshman	Goodlettsville, Tennessee
23	Scott Saunders	Forward/Center	6–10	250	Junior	New Orleans, Louisiana
24	Adam Barnes	Guard	6–7	240	Sophomore	Clarksville, Tennessee
30	Tevor Noack	Forward	6–7	240	Sophomore	Keller, Texas
32	Jordan Campbell	Guard/Forward	6–5	210	Senior	Indianapolis, Indiana
34	Mick Hedgepeth	Forward/Center	6–9	235	Junior	Crossville, Alabama
45	Brandon Baker	Forward	6–6	220	Sophomore	Milford, Ohio

== Schedule ==
Date time, TV	Rank^{#}	Opponent^{#}	Result	Record	Site (attendance) city, state
Exhibition
11/9/10*; 6:00 pm		Northern State	W 79–64		Curb Event Center (1,929); Nashville, TN
Regular season
11/16/10*; 8:30 pm, ESPNU		at Tennessee; NIT Season Tip-Off	L 76–85	0–1	Thompson–Boling Arena (16,783); Knoxville, TN
11/17/10*; 8:30 pm		vs. Arkansas State; NIT Season Tip-Off	W 93–60	1–1	Thompson–Boling Arena (16,001); Knoxville, TN
11/22/10*; 3:30 pm		vs. Marist; NIT Season Tip-Off	W 102–74	2–1	LJVM Coliseum (158); Winston-Salem, NC
11/23/10*; 3:30 pm		vs. Winthrop; NIT Season Tip-Off	W 71–44	3–1	LJVM Coliseum (256); Winston-Salem, NC
11/29/10*; 6:00 pm		at Tennessee State	W 87–72	4–1	Gentry Complex (2,197); Nashville, TN
12/2/10; 7:15 pm		Mercer	W 89–67	5–1 (1–0)	Curb Event Center (2,104); Nashville, TN
12/4/10*; 1:00 pm, CSS		at Vanderbilt	L 76–85	5–2	Memorial Gymnasium (13,902); Nashville, TN
12/7/10*; 7:15 pm		Middle Tennessee	W 88–87 ^{2OT}	6–2	Curb Event Center (1,404); Nashville, TN
12/16/10; 7:15 pm		Kennesaw State	W 87–60	7–2 (2–0)	Curb Event Center (1,028); Nashville, TN
12/18/10*; 11:00 am		at Troy	W 98–63	8–2	Trojan Arena (317); Troy, AL
12/20/10*; 6:00 pm		at Alabama State	L 53–66	9–2	ASU Acadome (248); Montgomery, AL
12/23/10*; 6:30 pm, SportSouth		at Tennessee	L 65–66	9–3	Thompson–Boling Arena (17,594); Knoxville, TN
12/30/10*; 1:30 pm		Miami (OH)	W 83–72	10–3	Curb Event Center (1,198); Nashville, TN
1/3/11; 6:30 pm		at Florida Gulf Coast	W 83–51	11–3 (3–0)	Alico Arena (1,886); Fort Myers, FL
1/5/11; 7:15 pm		at Stetson	W 70–53	12–3 (4–0)	Edmunds Center (1,218); DeLand, FL
1/8/11; 4:15 pm		North Florida	W 91–59	13–3 (5–0)	Curb Event Center (1,204); Nashville, TN
1/10/11; 7:15 pm		Jacksonville	W 81–50	14–3 (6–0)	Curb Event Center (662); Nashville, TN
1/15/11; 7:30 pm		Lipscomb	W 88–52	15–3 (7–0)	Curb Event Center (5,123); Nashville, TN
1/15/11; 7:15 pm		Campbell	W 90–55	16–3 (8–0)	Curb Event Center (1,587); Nashville, TN
1/21/11; 6:00 pm		at USC Upstate	W 67–62	17–3 (9–0)	G. B. Hodge Center (742); Spartanburg, SC
1/29/11; 3:00 pm		at East Tennessee State	W 72–62	18–3 (10–0)	Memorial Center (4,299); Johnson City, TN
1/25/11; 7:00 pm, CSS		at Lipscomb	L 64–73	18–4 (10–1)	Allen Arena (5,122); Nashville, TN
1/28/11; 6:00 pm, CSS		Florida Gulf Coast	W 89–56	19–4 (11–1)	Curb Event Center (1,502); Nashville, TN
1/30/11; 2:00 pm		Stetson	W 82–64	20–4 (12–1)	Curb Event Center (1,266); Nashville, TN
2/3/11; 6:30 pm		at Jacksonville	W 76–70	21–4 (13–1)	Jacksonville Veterans Memorial Arena (5,240); Jacksonville, FL
2/5/11; 6:00 pm		at North Florida	W 69–67	22–4 (14–1)	UNF Arena (1,129); Jacksonville, FL
2/12/11; 2:15 pm		at Campbell	W 78–57	23–4 (15–1)	John W. Pope, Jr. Convocation Center (1,670); Buies Creek, NC
2/17/11; 7:00 pm		East Tennessee State	W 68–58	24–4 (16–1)	Curb Event Center (1,901); Nashville, TN
2/19/11; 7:30 pm		USC Upstate	W 81–49	25–4 (17–1)	Curb Event Center (2,643); Nashville, TN
2/24/11; 6:30 pm		at Mercer	W 75–64	26–4 (18–1)	University Center (1,331); Macon, GA
2/27/11; 6:30 pm		at Kennesaw State	W 88–41	27–4 (19–1)	KSU Convocation Center (1,226); Kennesaw, GA
Atlantic Sun tournament
3/2/11; 1:30 pm	(1)	vs. (8) Kennesaw State; Quarterfinals	W 72–57	28–4	University Center (687); Macon, GA
3/4/11; 6:30 pm, CSS	(1)	vs. (5) Mercer; Semifinals	W 80–72	29–4	University Center (NA); Macon, GA
3/5/11; 5:00 pm, ESPN2	(1)	vs. (6) North Florida; Championship Game	W 87–46	30–4	University Center (1,323); Macon, GA
NCAA tournament
3/17/11*; 6:27 pm, truTV	(13 SE)	vs. (4 SE) No. 16 Wisconsin; Second Round	L 58–72	30–5	McKale Center (10,293); Tucson, AZ
*Non-conference game. ^{#}Rankings from AP Poll. (#) Tournament seedings in parentheses. SE=NCAA Southeast Region. All times are in Central Time.
