= 2010–11 Davidson Wildcats men's basketball team =

American college basketball season

2010–11 Davidson Wildcats men's basketball

CBI, Quarterfinals
- Conference: Southern Conference
- South
- Record: 18–15 (10–8 SoCon)
- Head coach: Bob McKillop (22nd season)
- Assistant coaches: Jim Fox (10th season); Landry Kosmalski (4th season); Matt McKillop (3rd season)
- Home arena: John M. Belk Arena

2010–11 Southern Conference men's basketball standings
	Conf.				Overall
Team	W		L	PCT	W		L	PCT
North
Western Carolina	12	–	6	.667	18	–	15	.545
Chattanooga	12	–	6	.667	16	–	16	.500
Appalachian State	10	–	8	.556	16	–	15	.516
Elon	7	–	11	.389	14	–	17	.452
UNC Greensboro	6	–	12	.333	7	–	24	.226
Samford	4	–	14	.222	12	–	19	.387
South
College of Charleston	14	–	4	.778	25	–	10	.714
Wofford†	14	–	4	.778	21	–	13	.618
Furman	12	–	6	.667	22	–	11	.667
Davidson	10	–	8	.556	18	–	15	.545
The Citadel	6	–	12	.333	10	–	22	.313
Georgia Southern	1	–	17	.056	5	–	27	.156
† SoCon Tournament winner As of March 31, 2011; Rankings from AP Poll

The 2010–11 Davidson Wildcats men's basketball team represented Davidson College in the 2010–11 NCAA Division I men's basketball season. The Wildcats, led by head coach Bob McKillop, played their home games at John M. Belk Arena in Davidson, North Carolina, as members of the Southern Conference. The Wildcats finished fourth in the SoCon's South Division during the regular season, and were eliminated in the first round of the SoCon tournament by UNC Greensboro.

Davidson failed to qualify for the NCAA tournament, but were invited to the 2011 College Basketball Invitational. The Wildcats won their first game in the tournament, but were eliminated in the quarterfinals of the CBI in a loss to Creighton, 102–92.

== Roster ==
2010–11 Davidson Wildcats men's basketball team
Players
Coaches

Pos.	#	Name	Height	Weight	Year	Hometown
G	1	Brendan McKillop	6 ft 1 in (1.85 m)	173 lb (78 kg)	Sr	Davidson, North Carolina
G	5	JP Kuhlman	6 ft 4 in (1.93 m)	190 lb (86 kg)	So	Ponte Vedra Beach, Florida
G	12	Nik Cochran	6 ft 3 in (1.91 m)	184 lb (83 kg)	So	Vancouver, British Columbia, Canada
G	14	Clay Tormey	5 ft 11 in (1.8 m)	170 lb (77 kg)	Fr	Chicago, Illinois
F	15	Jake Cohen	6 ft 10 in (2.08 m)	220 lb (100 kg)	So	Berwyn, Pennsylvania
G	20	Will Reigel	6 ft 5 in (1.96 m)	194 lb (88 kg)	Jr	Charlotte, North Carolina
F	22	Ali Mackay	6 ft 11 in (2.11 m)	192 lb (87 kg)	Fr	North Berwick, Scotland
G	23	Tom Droney	6 ft 6 in (1.98 m)	194 lb (88 kg)	Fr	Pittsburgh, Pennsylvania
F	24	De'Mon Brooks	6 ft 7 in (2.01 m)	223 lb (101 kg)	Fr	Charlotte, North Carolina
G	25	AJ Atkinson	6 ft 6 in (1.98 m)	214 lb (97 kg)	Jr	Winston-Salem, North Carolina
G	31	Jordan Downing	6 ft 5 in (1.96 m)	194 lb (88 kg)	Fr	Huntersville, North Carolina
F	34	Frank Ben-Eze	6 ft 10 in (2.08 m)	237 lb (108 kg)	Jr	Arlington, Virginia
G	35	Chris Czerapowicz	6 ft 7 in (2.01 m)	197 lb (89 kg)	Fr	Gothenburg, Sweden
F	40	Clint Mann	6 ft 7 in (2.01 m)	235 lb (107 kg)	So	Overland Park, Kansas
F	42	Ben Allison	6 ft 9 in (2.06 m)	223 lb (101 kg)	Jr	West Sussex, England

Head coach

- Bob McKillop (Hofstra)

Assistant coach(es)

- Jim Fox (SUNY Geneseo)
- Landry Kosmalski (Davidson)
- Matt McKillop (Davidson)

Legend

- (C) Team captain
- (S) Suspended
- (I) Ineligible
- (W) Walk-on
- Injured
- Current redshirt

Roster
Last update: January 23, 2023

== Schedule and results ==
Date time, TV	Rank^{#}	Opponent^{#}	Result	Record	Site (attendance) city, state
Exhibition
November 6, 2010*; 2:00 pm		Lenoir–Rhyne	W 65–61	—	John M. Belk Arena; Davidson, NC
Regular season
November 13, 2010*; 7:00 pm		at Penn	L 64–69	0–1	The Palestra (5,633); Philadelphia, PA
November 18, 2010*; 11:30 am, ESPNU		vs. West Virginia; Puerto Rico Tip-Off	L 70–84	0–2	Coliseo de Puerto Rico (7,205); San Juan, Puerto Rico
November 19, 2010*; 3:00 pm, ESPN3.com		vs. Nebraska; Puerto Rico Tip-Off	W 70–67	1–2	Coliseo de Puerto Rico (10,127); San Juan, Puerto Rico
November 21, 2010*; 12:30 pm, ESPNU		vs. Western Kentucky; Puerto Rico Tip-Off	W 64–51	2–2	Coliseo de Puerto Rico (11,575); San Juan, Puerto Rico
November 27, 2010*; 2:00 pm		at Rhode Island	L 58–71	2–3	Ryan Center (4,712); Kingston, RI
November 29, 2010*; 7:00 pm		Monmouth	W 69–53	3–3	John M. Belk Arena (3,106); Davidson, NC
December 2, 2010; 7:00 pm		at College of Charleston	L 73–82	3–4 (0–1)	Carolina First Arena (4,361); Charleston, SC
December 4, 2010; 3:00 pm		at The Citadel	W 68–53	4–4 (1–1)	McAlister Field House (1,188); Charleston, SC
December 11, 2010*; 7:00 pm		Charlotte	W 82–68	5–4	John M. Belk Arena (5,212); Davidson, NC
December 20, 2010*; 9:00 pm, MSG		at St. John's; MSG Holiday Festival	L 57–62	5–5	Madison Square Garden (6,596); New York, NY
December 21, 2010*; 7:00 pm, MSG		vs. St. Francis Brooklyn; MSG Holiday Festival	W 76–69	6–5	Madison Square Garden (5,583); New York, NY
December 30, 2010*; 7:00 pm		Saint Joseph's (ME)	W 108–39	7–5	John M. Belk Arena (3,408); Davidson, NC
January 2, 2011*; 5:00 pm		at No. 24 Vanderbilt	L 52–80	7–6	Memorial Gymnasium (13,106); Nashville, TN
January 5, 2011; 7:00 pm		Appalachian State	L 66–74	7–7 (1–2)	John M. Belk Arena (3,842); Davidson, NC
January 8, 2011; 12:00 pm		at Western Carolina	L 73–81	7–8 (1–3)	Ramsey Center (1,044); Cullowhee, NC
January 12, 2011; 7:00 pm		Furman	W 79–70	8–8 (2–3)	John M. Belk Arena (3,404); Davidson, NC
January 15, 2011; 7:00 pm		Wofford	L 64–69	8–9 (2–4)	John M. Belk Arena (4,181); Davidson, NC
January 17, 2011; 7:00 pm		at UNC Greensboro	L 69–77	8–10 (2–5)	Greensboro Coliseum (2,792); Greensboro, NC
January 20, 2011; 7:00 pm		at Elon	L 70–77	8–11 (2–6)	Alumni Gym (1,533); Elon, NC
January 26, 2011; 7:00 pm		The Citadel	L 75–85	8–12 (2–7)	John M. Belk Arena (3,458); Davidson, NC
January 29, 2011; 2:00 pm, SportSouth		College of Charleston	W 75–64	9–12 (3–7)	John M. Belk Arena (4,295); Davidson, NC
January 31, 2011; 7:00 pm		at Georgia Southern	W 73–66	10–12 (4–7)	Hanner Fieldhouse (1,617); Statesboro, GA
February 3, 2011; 8:00 pm		at Samford	W 62–49	11–12 (5–7)	Pete Hanna Center (602); Homewood, AL
February 5, 2011; 7:00 pm		Chattanooga	W 73–59	12–12 (6–7)	John M. Belk Arena (3,545); Davidson, NC
February 9, 2011; 7:00 pm		at Wofford	W 67–58	13–12 (7–7)	Benjamin Johnson Arena (3,545); Spartanburg, SC
February 12, 2011; 6:00 pm, CSS		at Furman	L 79–88	13–13 (7–8)	Timmons Arena (2,782); Greenville, SC
February 16, 2011; 7:00 pm		Georgia Southern	W 83–56	14–13 (8–8)	John M. Belk Arena (3,437); Davidson, NC
February 19, 2011*; 7:30 pm		at Presbyterian; ESPN BracketBusters	W 73–70	15–13	Templeton Physical Education Center (1,958); Clinton, SC
February 24, 2011; 7:00 pm		Elon	W 83–75	16–13 (9–8)	John M. Belk Arena (3,288); Davidson, NC
February 26, 2011; 2:00 pm		UNC Greensboro	W 78–67	17–13 (10–8)	John M. Belk Arena (3,762); Davidson, NC
SoCon tournament
March 4, 2011; 2:00 pm	(S4)	vs. (N5) UNC Greensboro; SoCon Quarterfinals	L 64–71	17–14	McKenzie Arena (2,183); Chattanooga, TN
CBI
March 15, 2011; 7:00 pm, HDNet		James Madison; CBI First Round	W 85–65	18–14	John M. Belk Arena (989); Davidson, NC
March 21, 2011; 8:05 pm, HDNet		at Creighton; CBI Quarterfinals	L 92–102	18–15	Qwest Center Omaha (4,832); Omaha, NE
*Non-conference game. ^{#}Rankings from AP Poll. (#) Tournament seedings in parentheses. All times are in Eastern Time.
