= 2010–11 Western Carolina Catamounts men's basketball team =

American college basketball season

2010–11 Western Carolina Catamounts men's basketball
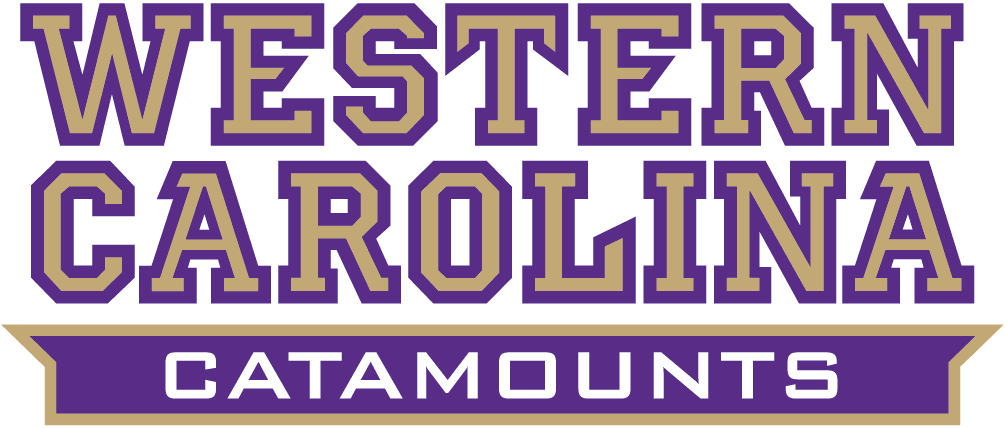
- Conference: Southern Conference
- Record: 18–15 (12–6 SoCon)
- Head coach: Larry Hunter
- Home arena: Ramsey Center

2010–11 Southern Conference men's basketball standings
	Conf.				Overall
Team	W		L	PCT	W		L	PCT
North
Western Carolina	12	–	6	.667	18	–	15	.545
Chattanooga	12	–	6	.667	16	–	16	.500
Appalachian State	10	–	8	.556	16	–	15	.516
Elon	7	–	11	.389	14	–	17	.452
UNC Greensboro	6	–	12	.333	7	–	24	.226
Samford	4	–	14	.222	12	–	19	.387
South
College of Charleston	14	–	4	.778	25	–	10	.714
Wofford†	14	–	4	.778	21	–	13	.618
Furman	12	–	6	.667	22	–	11	.667
Davidson	10	–	8	.556	18	–	15	.545
The Citadel	6	–	12	.333	10	–	22	.313
Georgia Southern	1	–	17	.056	5	–	27	.156
† SoCon Tournament winner As of March 31, 2011; Rankings from AP Poll

The 2010–11 Western Carolina Catamounts men's basketball team represented Western Carolina University during the 2010–11 college basketball season. This was head coach Larry Hunter's sixth season at Western Carolina. The Catamounts competed in the Southern Conference and played their home games at the Ramsey Center.

== Schedule and results ==
Date time, TV	Rank^{#}	Opponent^{#}	Result	Record	Site (attendance) city, state
Regular season
11/12/2010*		at Clemson	L 64–87	0–1	Littlejohn Coliseum (7,920); Clemson, SC
11/16/2010*		at DePaul	W 69–64	1–1	Allstate Arena (7,021); Rosemont, IL
11/20/2010*		at UTEP; Legends Classic Regional	L 65–77	1–2	Don Haskins Center (3,489); El Paso, TX
11/22/2010*		Warren Wilson	W 97–47	2–2	Ramsey Center (1,343); Cullowhee, NC
11/26/2010*		vs. Mercer; Legends Classic Subregional	L 66–71	2–3	Kaplan Arena (1,224); Williamsburg, VA
11/27/2010*		vs. Gardner–Webb; Legends Classic Subregional	L 65–71	2–4	Kaplan Arena (1,011); Williamsburg, VA
11/28/2010*		at William & Mary; Legends Classic Subregional	W 64–39	3–4	Kaplan Arena (1,126); Williamsburg, VA
11/30/2010*		Bradley	W 66–65	4–4	Ramsey Center (1,872); Cullowhee, NC
12/2/2010		at Samford	L 58–63	4–5 (0-1)	Pete Hanna Center (550); Birmingham, AL
12/4/2010		at Chattanooga	L 65–67	4–6 (0-2)	McKenzie Arena (2,602); Chattanooga, TN
12/10/2010*		at Campbell	L 50–73	4–7	John W. Pope Jr. Convocation Center (1,298); Buies Creek, NC
12/12/2010*		at No. 2 Ohio State	L 60–85	4–8	Value City Arena (6,905); Columbus, OH
12/18/2010*		at Dayton	L 60–71	4–9	UD Arena (12,338); Dayton, OH
12/28/2010*		at UNC Asheville	L 79–85 ^{OT}	4–10	Justice Center (1,078); Asheville, NC
1/5/2011		at Georgia Southern	W 81–58	5–10 (1-2)	Hanner Fieldhouse (1,163); Statesboro, GA
1/8/2011		Pacific	W 81–73	6–10 (2-2)	Ramsey Center (1,044); Cullowhee, NC
1/13/2011		Elon	W 70–63	7–10 (3-2)	Ramsey Center (2,071); Cullowhee, NC
1/15/2011		Appalachian State	W 79–78	8–10 (4-2)	Ramsey Center (3,884); Cullowhee, NC
1/20/2011		at College of Charleston	L 64–93	8–11 (4-3)	Carolina First Arena (3,957); Charleston, SC
1/22/2011		at The Citadel	L 46–68	8–12 (4-4)	McAlister Field House (2,143); Charleston, SC
1/27/2011		Furman	W 65–41	9–12 (5-4)	Ramsey Center (2,083); Cullowhee, NC
1/29/2011		at Wofford	L 66–75	9–13 (5-5)	Benjamin Johnson Arena (2,026); Spartanburg, SC
2/2/2011		at Elon	W 74–58	10–13 (6-5)	Alumni Gym (1,083); Elon, NC
2/5/2011		UNC Greensboro	W 83–73	11–13 (7-5)	Ramsey Center (3,112); Cullowhee, NC
2/11/2011		Chattanooga	W 69–68	12–13 (8-5)	Ramsey Center (1,471); Cullowhee, NC
2/12/2011		Samford	W 85–63	13–13 (9-5)	Ramsey Center (1,638); Cullowhee, NC
2/17/2011		at Appalachian State	W 80–75	14–13 (10-5)	Holmes Center (2,186); Boone, NC
2/19/2011		Eastern Kentucky	W 81–74	15–13	Ramsey Center (3,216); Cullowhee, NC
2/21/2011		at UNC Greensboro	W 70–66	16–13 (11-5)	Greensboro Coliseum (3,161); Greensboro, NC
2/24/2011		The Citadel	L 62–70	16–14 (11-6)	Ramsey Center (1,573); Cullowhee, NC
2/26/2011		College of Charleston	W 70–62	17–14 (12-6)	Ramsey Center (3,471); Cullowhee, NC
Southern Conference Tournament
3/5/2011	(N1)	vs. (N5) UNC Greensboro; Southern Conference Quarterfinals	W 77–66	18–14	McKenzie Arena; Chattanooga, TN
3/6/2011	(N1)	vs. (S2) Wofford; Southern Conference Semifinals	L 72–86	18–15	McKenzie Arena; Chattanooga, TN
*Non-conference game. ^{#}Rankings from AP Poll. (#) Tournament seedings in parentheses. All times are in Eastern Time.
