= Murry Bartow =

American college basketball coach (born 1961)

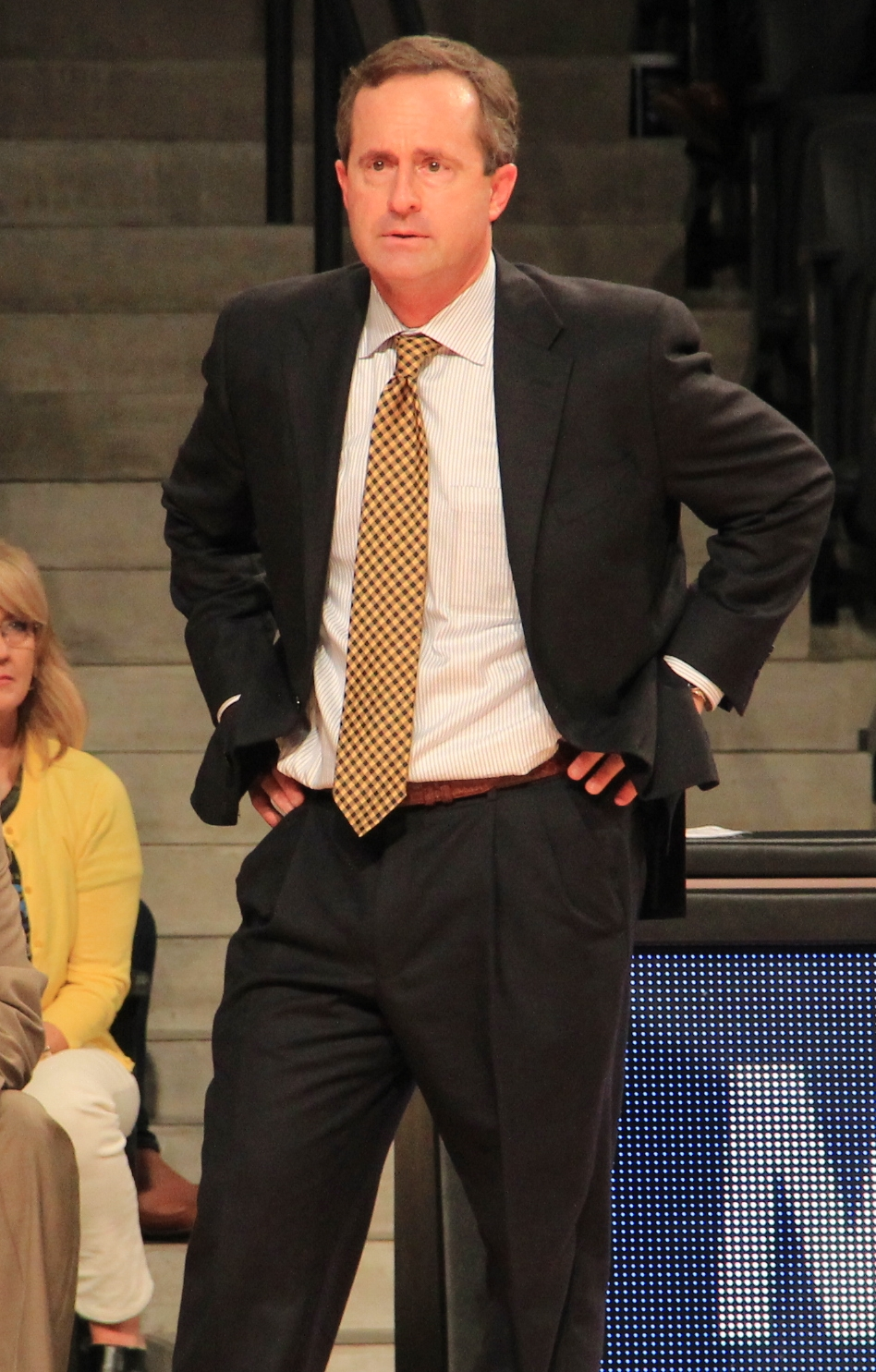
- Bartow in 2013

Biographical details
- Born: August 18, 1961 (age 65); Warrensburg, Missouri, U.S.

Playing career
- 1980–1985: UAB

Coaching career (HC unless noted)
- 1985–1987: Indiana (assistant)
- 1987–1989: William & Mary (assistant)
- 1989–1996: UAB (assistant)
- 1996–2002: UAB
- 2003–2015: East Tennessee State
- 2016–2017: South Florida (assistant)
- 2017: South Florida (interim HC)
- 2018: UCLA (assistant)
- 2018–2019: UCLA (interim HC)

Head coaching record
- Overall: 338–274
- Tournaments: 0–4 (NCAA Division I); 1–3 (NIT); 3–2 (CIT)

Accomplishments and honors

Championships
- SoCon tournament (2004); SoCon regular season (2004); 2 Atlantic Sun tournament (2009, 2010); Atlantic Sun regular season (2007)

Awards
- SoCon Coach of the Year (2004); Atlantic Sun Coach of the Year (2007)

Murry Linn Bartow (born August 18, 1961) is an American former college basketball coach. As the head coach of the East Tennessee State Buccaneers, he was twice named the conference coach of the year, first in the Southern Conference in 2004 and later in the Atlantic Sun Conference in 2007. He was later an interim head coach with the South Florida Bulls and UCLA Bruins.

== Career ==
=== UAB ===
Bartow served as the head coach for his alma mater University of Alabama at Birmingham (UAB) from 1996 to 2002, succeeding his father Gene, the creator of the UAB Blazers men's basketball program. At UAB, he compiled a 103–83 overall record with a conference mark of 48–46 and one NCAA Tournament appearance.

=== East Tennessee State ===
Bartow was the men's head basketball coach at East Tennessee State University (ETSU) from 2003 to 2015. Bartow's first season at ETSU brought division and conference regular season titles and the Southern Conference (SoCon) Tournament championship. The team finished 27–6 (15–1 conference) and ended their season in an 80–77 NCAA tournament opening round loss to Cincinnati. Bartow was named the SoCon Coach of the Year.

Bartow led the Buccaneers to the regular season Atlantic Sun Conference title in 2006–07 with a 24–10 overall record, despite the graduation of three starters. Bartow was named Atlantic Sun Coach of the Year. The Buccaneers earned NCAA tournament appearances for winning A-Sun Conference tournament championships in the 2008–09 and 2009–10 seasons.

Overall, Bartow led the Bucs to three NCAA appearances in his tenure at ETSU. After a change in the school president and athletic director, Bartow was released at the end of 2015.

=== University of South Florida ===
Bartow was hired as an assistant coach at the University of South Florida (USF) in August 2016.

He was named interim head coach on January 3, 2017 following the firing of head coach Orlando Antigua. Bartow led the team to a 1–16 record during his time as interim head coach.

=== UCLA ===
In April 2018, Bartow was hired by UCLA head coach Steve Alford as an assistant coach to replace the fired David Grace. On December 31, 2018, Bartow was named the interim head coach after Alford was fired in the middle of the 2018–19 season. The Bruins had begun the season 4–0 and ranked No. 17 in the AP Poll, but they lost six of the next nine and finished with a 7–6 record in nonconference play, closing it out with four straight losses. Under Bartow, UCLA opened conference play 2–0 at home against San Francisco Bay Area schools Stanford and California. Emphasizing the team's speed and athleticism, he had the Bruins play more aggressive, trapping and applying pressure on defense and attacking on offense by running on both missed and made baskets. Six Bruins scored in double figures against Cal after five reached the threshold against the Cardinal. In their 13 non-conference games under Alford, UCLA never had more than four double-figure scorers.

Bartow compiled a 10–10 record as interim head coach at UCLA, including a 9–9 record in regular season Pac-12 games. The Bruins defeated Stanford in the first round of the Pac-12 tournament before losing to Arizona State in the quarterfinals. Afterwards, Bartow stated that he was not interested in having his interim tag removed, and expressed optimism that UCLA would "hire a very good coach".

== Personal life ==
Born in Warrensburg, Missouri, Bartow holds a B.A. from University of Alabama at Birmingham and a master's degree from Indiana University Bloomington. He is married to his wife Tammy (née Earley), and they have 3 children together.

His father, Gene, was a Hall of Fame college basketball coach, coaching UCLA and UAB, among other schools.

== Head coaching record ==
Record table
Season	Team	Overall	Conference	Standing	Postseason
UAB Blazers (Conference USA) (1996–2002)
1996–97	UAB	18–14	7–7	2nd (Red)	NIT first round
1997–98	UAB	21–12	10–6	2nd (National)	NIT second round
1998–99	UAB	20–12	10–6	1st (National)	NCAA Division I First Round
1999–00	UAB	14–14	7–9	T–3rd (National)	
2000–01	UAB	17–14	8–8	4th (National)	
2001–02	UAB	13–17	6–10	T–4th (National)	
UAB:		103–83 (.554)	48–46 (.511)		
East Tennessee State Buccaneers (Southern Conference) (2003–2005)
2003–04	East Tennessee State	27–6	15–1	1st (North)	NCAA Division I First Round
2004–05	East Tennessee State	10–19	4–12	5th (North)	
East Tennessee State Buccaneers (Atlantic Sun Conference) (2005–2014)
2005–06	East Tennessee State	15–13	12–8	5th	
2006–07	East Tennessee State	24–10	16–2	1st	NIT first round
2007–08	East Tennessee State	19–13	11–5	T–3rd	
2008–09	East Tennessee State	23–10	14–6	T–2nd	NCAA Division I First Round
2009–10	East Tennessee State	20–15	13–7	T–2nd	NCAA Division I First Round
2010–11	East Tennessee State	24–12	16–4	2nd	CIT semifinal
2011–12	East Tennessee State	17–13	10–8	T–4th	
2012–13	East Tennessee State	10–22	8–10	T–7th	
2013–14	East Tennessee State	19–16	10–8	4th	CIT second round
East Tennessee State Buccaneers (Southern Conference) (2014–2015)
2014–15	East Tennessee State	16–14	8–10	5th	
East Tennessee State:		224–165 (.576)	127–81 (.611)		
South Florida Bulls (American Athletic Conference) (2017)
2016–17	South Florida	1–16	1–15	11th	
South Florida:		1–16 (.059)	1–15 (.063)		
UCLA Bruins (Pac-12 Conference) (2018–2019)
2018–19	UCLA	10–10	9–9	7th	
UCLA:		10–10 (.500)	9–9 (.500)		
Total:		338–274 (.552)			
National champion Postseason invitational champion Conference regular season champion Conference regular season and conference tournament champion Division regular season champion Division regular season and conference tournament champion Conference tournament champion
