= 2010–11 Southern Conference men's basketball season =

2010–10 Southern Conference Men's Basketball Season
- League: NCAA Division I
- Sport: Basketball
- Number of teams: 12
- TV partner(s): SoConTV

Regular Season
- 2011 Southern Conference Champions: Charleston and Wofford (South), Western Carolina and Chattanooga (North)
- Season MVP: Andrew Goudelock, Charleston

Tournament
- Champions: Wofford
- Runners-up: Charleston
- Finals MVP: Noah Dahlman, Wofford

Basketball seasons
- ← 09–10 11–12 →

2010–11 Southern Conference men's basketball standings
	Conf.				Overall
Team	W		L	PCT	W		L	PCT
North
Western Carolina	12	–	6	.667	18	–	15	.545
Chattanooga	12	–	6	.667	16	–	16	.500
Appalachian State	10	–	8	.556	16	–	15	.516
Elon	7	–	11	.389	14	–	17	.452
UNC Greensboro	6	–	12	.333	7	–	24	.226
Samford	4	–	14	.222	12	–	19	.387
South
College of Charleston	14	–	4	.778	25	–	10	.714
Wofford†	14	–	4	.778	21	–	13	.618
Furman	12	–	6	.667	22	–	11	.667
Davidson	10	–	8	.556	18	–	15	.545
The Citadel	6	–	12	.333	10	–	22	.313
Georgia Southern	1	–	17	.056	5	–	27	.156
† SoCon Tournament winner As of March 31, 2011; Rankings from AP Poll

The 2010–11 Southern Conference men's basketball season featured twelve teams competing in two divisions for regular season and tournament titles. Both divisions ended in a tie for the division lead, with the North being shared between Chattanooga and Western Carolina and the South claimed by both College of Charleston and Wofford. Wofford claimed the 2011 Southern Conference men's basketball tournament championship.

== Awards ==
Player of the Year

- Andrew Goudelock, College of Charleston

Defensive of the Year

- Richie Gordon, Western Carolina

Freshman of the Year

- Trey Simler, Western Carolina

Coach of the Year

- Bobby Cremins, College of Charleston

All Conference Team

- Omar Carter, Appalachian State
- Donald Sims, Appalachian State
- Andrew Goudelock, College of Charleston
- Donavan Monroe, College of Charleston
- Cameron Wells, The Citadel
- Chris Long, Elon
- Amu Saaka, Furman
- Omar Wattad, Chattanooga
- Mike Williams, Western Carolina
- Noah Dahlman, Wofford

All Freshman Team

- Trent Wiedeman, College of Charleston
- Lucas Troutman, Elon
- Eric Ferguson, Georgia Southern
- Trevis Simpson, UNCG
- Trey Sumler, Western Carolina
