= 2010–11 Charleston Cougars men's basketball team =

American college basketball season

2010–11 Charleston Cougars men's basketball

SoCon Regular Season co-champions

NIT, Quarterfinal
- Conference: Southern Conference
- South Division
- Record: 26–11 (14–4 SoCon)
- Head coach: Bobby Cremins (5th season)
- Assistant coaches: Mark Byington (6th season); Fred Dupree (5th season); Andrew Wilson (5th season)
- Home arena: Carolina First Arena

2010–11 Southern Conference men's basketball standings
	Conf.				Overall
Team	W		L	PCT	W		L	PCT
North
Western Carolina	12	–	6	.667	18	–	15	.545
Chattanooga	12	–	6	.667	16	–	16	.500
Appalachian State	10	–	8	.556	16	–	15	.516
Elon	7	–	11	.389	14	–	17	.452
UNC Greensboro	6	–	12	.333	7	–	24	.226
Samford	4	–	14	.222	12	–	19	.387
South
College of Charleston	14	–	4	.778	25	–	10	.714
Wofford†	14	–	4	.778	21	–	13	.618
Furman	12	–	6	.667	22	–	11	.667
Davidson	10	–	8	.556	18	–	15	.545
The Citadel	6	–	12	.333	10	–	22	.313
Georgia Southern	1	–	17	.056	5	–	27	.156
† SoCon Tournament winner As of March 31, 2011; Rankings from AP Poll

The 2010–11 College of Charleston Cougars men's basketball team represented the College of Charleston in the 2010–11 NCAA Division I men's basketball season. The Cougars, led by head coach Bobby Cremins, played their home games at Carolina First Arena in Charleston, South Carolina, as members of the Southern Conference. The Cougars won a share of the regular-season title in the Southern Conference, and advanced to the championship game of the SoCon tournament, where they were defeated by Wofford.

College of Charleston failed to qualify for the NCAA tournament, but received an automatic bid to the 2011 NIT as the regular-season champions of the Southern Conference. The Cougars advanced to the quarterfinals of the NIT, where they were eliminated by eventual champions Wichita State, 82–75.

== Roster ==
2010–11 College of Charleston Cougars men's basketball team
Players
Coaches

Pos.	#	Name	Height	Weight	Year	Hometown
G	1	Donavan Moore	6 ft 3 in (1.91 m)	—	Sr	Waxhaw, North Carolina
SF	2	Matt Sundberg	6 ft 8 in (2.03 m)	—	Jr	Kennesaw, Georgia
G	3	Andrew Goudelock	6 ft 2 in (1.88 m)	—	Sr	Stone Mountain, Georgia
G	4	Andrew Lawrence	6 ft 1 in (1.85 m)	—	So	London, England
G/F	11	Nori Johnson	6 ft 5 in (1.96 m)	—	Fr	Greer, South Carolina
G	14	Bart Benton	6 ft 0 in (1.83 m)	—	So	Monroe, Georgia
F	21	Jeremy Simmons	6 ft 8 in (2.03 m)	—	Sr	Lithonia, Georgia
F	30	Antwaine Wiggins	6 ft 7 in (2.01 m)	—	RS Jr	Greeneville, Tennessee
G	35	Jordan Turok	6 ft 1 in (1.85 m)	—	Sr	Chapin, South Carolina
F	41	Garrett Campbell	6 ft 8 in (2.03 m)	—	Sr	Myrtle Beach, South Carolina
F	44	Trent Wiedeman	6 ft 8 in (2.03 m)	—	Fr	Suwanee, Georgia
F	53	Willis Hall	6 ft 6 in (1.98 m)	—	So	Charlotte, North Carolina

Head coach

- Bobby Cremins (South Carolina)

Assistant coach(es)

- Mark Byington (UNC Wilmington)
- Fred Dupree (Canisius)
- Andrew Wilson (Florida State)

Legend

- (C) Team captain
- (S) Suspended
- (I) Ineligible
- (W) Walk-on
- Injured
- Current redshirt

Roster
Last update: January 16, 2023

== Schedule and results ==
Date time, TV	Rank^{#}	Opponent^{#}	Result	Record	Site (attendance) city, state
Exhibition
November 5, 2010*; 7:00 pm		Francis Marion	W 86–75	—	Carolina First Arena (2,025); Charleston, SC
Regular season
November 10, 2010*; 7:00 pm		at Maryland; 2K Sports Classic	L 74–75	0–1	Comcast Center (13,708); College Park, MD
November 13, 2010*; 7:00 pm		at Holy Cross	W 93–84	1–1	Hart Center (2,966); Worcester, MA
November 16, 2010*; 7:00 pm		Coastal Carolina	W 83–67	2–1	Carolina First Arena (3,917); Charleston, SC
November 19, 2010*; 4:30 pm		vs. Rhode Island; 2K Sports Classic	L 66–75	2–2	Savage Arena (4,323); Toledo, OH
November 20, 2010*; 4:30 pm		vs. UIC; 2K Sports Classic	W 78–66	3–2	Savage Arena (4,227); Toledo, OH
November 21, 2010*; 3:00 pm		at Toledo; 2K Sports Classic	W 64–51	4–2	Carolina First Arena (3,948); Charleston, SC
November 28, 2010*; 5:30 pm		at No. 25 North Carolina	L 69–74	4–3	Dean Smith Center (15,932); Chapel Hill, NC
December 2, 2010; 7:00 pm		Davidson	W 82–73	5–3 (1–0)	Carolina First Arena (4,361); Charleston, SC
December 4, 2010; 6:00 pm		Georgia Southern	W 82–73	6–3 (2–0)	Carolina First Arena (4,361); Charleston, SC
December 7, 2010*; 7:00 pm		East Tennessee State	W 79–59	7–3	Carolina First Arena (3,137); Charleston, SC
December 15, 2010*; 7:30 pm		at Charleston Southern	W 77–69	8–3	North Charleston Coliseum (2,722); North Charleston, SC
December 22, 2010*; 7:00 pm		Clemson	L 59–66	8–4	Carolina First Arena (5,048); Charleston, SC
December 31, 2010*; 2:00 pm		at Tennessee	W 91–78	9–4	Thompson–Boling Arena (17,794); Knoxville, TN
January 2, 2011*; 4:30 pm		at Morehead State	L 49–69	9–5	Ellis Johnson Arena (3,172); Morehead, KY
January 6, 2011; 7:00 pm		at Furman	W 76–72	10–5 (3–0)	Timmons Arena (2,078); Greenville, SC
January 8, 2011; 6:00 pm		at Wofford	W 65–57	11–5 (4–0)	Benjamin Johnson Arena (2,519); Spartanburg, SC
January 15, 2011; 2:00 pm		The Citadel	W 87–66	12–5 (5–0)	Carolina First Arena (5,162); Charleston, SC
January 17, 2011; 7:00 pm		at Chattanooga	L 88–91	12–6 (5–1)	McKenzie Arena (3,823); Chattanooga, TN
January 20, 2011; 7:00 pm		Western Carolina	W 93–64	13–6 (6–1)	Carolina First Arena (3,957); Charleston, SC
January 22, 2011; 4:00 pm		Appalachian State	W 73–64	14–6 (7–1)	Carolina First Arena (4,758); Charleston, SC
January 26, 2011; 7:00 pm		at Georgia Southern	W 65–61	15–6 (8–1)	Hanner Fieldhouse (1,768); Statesboro, GA
January 29, 2011; 2:00 pm		at Davidson	L 64–75	15–7 (8–2)	John M. Belk Arena (4,295); Davidson, NC
February 3, 2011; 7:00 pm		Wofford	W 79–54	16–7 (9–2)	Carolina First Arena (5,038); Charleston, SC
February 5, 2011; 4:00 pm		Furman; Homecoming	W 73–54	17–7 (10–2)	Carolina First Arena (5,081); Charleston, SC
February 9, 2011; 7:00 pm		at Elon	W 85–67	18–7 (11–2)	Alumni Gym (1,039); Elon, NC
February 12, 2011; 4:00 pm		UNC Greensboro	W 87–69	19–7 (12–2)	Carolina First Arena (4,048); Charleston, SC
February 17, 2011; 7:00 pm		at The Citadel	W 85–63	20–7 (13–2)	McAlister Field House (4,131); Charleston, SC
February 19, 2011*; 5:00 pm		Vermont; ESPN BracketBusters	W 85–70	21–7	Carolina First Arena (4,874); Charleston, SC
February 21, 2011; 7:00 pm		Samford	W 75–49	22–7 (14–2)	Carolina First Arena (4,386); Charleston, SC
February 24, 2011; 7:00 pm		at Appalachian State	L 70–85	22–8 (14–3)	Holmes Center (1,662); Boone, NC
February 26, 2011; 4:30 pm		at Western Carolina	L 67–77	22–9 (14–4)	Ramsey Center (3,374); Cullowhee, NC
SoCon tournament
March 5, 2011; 9:30 pm	(S1)	vs. (N4) Elon; SoCon Quarterfinals	W 78–60	23–9	McKenzie Arena (5,597); Chattanooga, TN
March 6, 2011; 8:30 pm	(S1)	vs. (S3) Furman; SoCon Semifinals	W 63–58	24–9	McKenzie Arena (3,510); Chattanooga, TN
March 7, 2011; 9:00 pm	(S1)	vs. (S2) Wofford; SoCon Championship	L 67–77	24–10	McKenzie Arena (3,374); Chattanooga, TN
NIT
March 15, 2011; 8:00 pm	(6)	(3) Dayton; NIT First Round	W 94–84	25–10	Carolina First Arena (4,717); Charleston, SC
March 19, 2011; 2:00 pm	(6)	at (2) Cleveland State; NIT Second Round	W 64–56	26–10	Wolstein Center (2,077); Cleveland, OH
March 23, 2011; 7:00 pm	(6)	at (4) Wichita State; NIT Quarterfinals	L 75–82	26–11	Charles Koch Arena (10,506); Wichita, KS
*Non-conference game. ^{#}Rankings from AP Poll. (#) Tournament seedings in parentheses. All times are in Eastern Time.
