= 2010–11 The Citadel Bulldogs basketball team =

American college basketball season

2010–11 The Citadel Bulldogs men's basketball
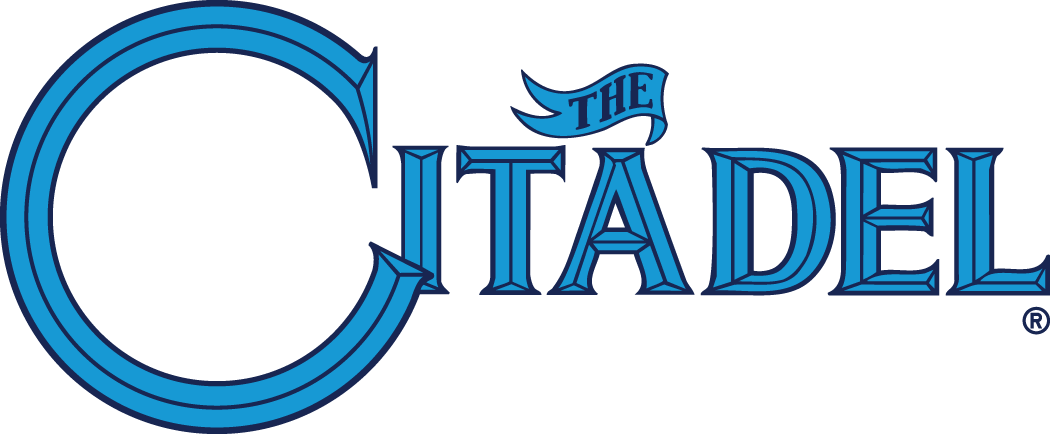
- Conference: Southern Conference
- Record: 10–22 (6–12 SoCon)
- Head coach: Chuck Driesell
- Assistant coaches: Rob Burke; J.D. Powell; Damien Price
- Home arena: McAlister Field House

The 2010–11 The Citadel Bulldogs basketball team represented The Citadel, The Military College of South Carolina in the 2010-11 NCAA Division I men's basketball season. The Bulldogs were led by first year head coach Chuck Driesell and played their home games at McAlister Field House. They played as members of the Southern Conference, as they have since 1936.

2010–11 Southern Conference men's basketball standings
	Conf.				Overall
Team	W		L	PCT	W		L	PCT
North
Western Carolina	12	–	6	.667	18	–	15	.545
Chattanooga	12	–	6	.667	16	–	16	.500
Appalachian State	10	–	8	.556	16	–	15	.516
Elon	7	–	11	.389	14	–	17	.452
UNC Greensboro	6	–	12	.333	7	–	24	.226
Samford	4	–	14	.222	12	–	19	.387
South
College of Charleston	14	–	4	.778	25	–	10	.714
Wofford†	14	–	4	.778	21	–	13	.618
Furman	12	–	6	.667	22	–	11	.667
Davidson	10	–	8	.556	18	–	15	.545
The Citadel	6	–	12	.333	10	–	22	.313
Georgia Southern	1	–	17	.056	5	–	27	.156
† SoCon Tournament winner As of March 31, 2011; Rankings from AP Poll

== Schedule ==
Date time, TV	Rank^{#}	Opponent^{#}	Result	Record	Site (attendance) city, state
Regular Season
11/12/2010*; 7:00 pm		at Richmond	L 37-79	0-1	Robins Center (6,008); Richmond, VA
11/16/2010*; 7:30 pm		at Charleston Southern	L 61-68	0-2	CSU Field House (952); North Charleston, SC
11/20/2010*; 7:00 pm		James Madison	L 67-74	0-3	McAlister Field House (1,071); Charleston, SC
11/23/2010*; 7:00 pm		High Point	W 71-63	1-3	McAlister Field House (1,224); Charleston, SC
11/27/2010*; 7:00 pm		at Coastal Carolina	L 64-72	1-4	Kimbel Arena (832); Conway, SC
12/2/2010; 7:00 pm		Georgia Southern	W 65-52	2-4 (1-0)	McAlister Field House (2,058); Charleston, SC
12/4/2010; 3:00 pm		Davidson	L 53-68	2-5 (1-1)	McAlister Field House (1,188); Charleston, SC
12/6/2010*; 7:00 pm		St. Mary's (MD)	W 72-64	3-5	McAlister Field House (1,127); Charleston, SC
12/17/2010*; 7:00 pm		at Colorado	L 61-89	3-6	Coors Events Center (4,368); Boulder, CO
12/19/2010*; 7:00 pm		at New Mexico	L 58-84	3-7	The Pit (14,640); Albuquerque, NM
12/22/2010*; 5:00 pm		vs. South Carolina State; Las Vegas Classic	W 67-57	4-7	Orleans Arena; Las Vegas, NV
12/23/2010*; 5:00 pm		vs. SIU Edwardsville; Las Vegas Classic	L 55-59	4-8	Orleans Arena; Las Vegas, NV
12/31/2010*; 3:00 pm		Chowan	W 67-53	5-8	McAlister Field House (1,095); Charleston, SC
1/2/2011*; 4:00 pm		at Clemson	L 54-69	5-9	Littlejohn Coliseum (7,613); Clemson, SC
1/6/2011; 7:00 pm		at Wofford	L 60-78	5-10 (1-2)	Benjamin Johnson Arena (1,401); Spartanburg, SC
1/8/2011; 7:00 pm		at Furman	L 67-88	5-11 (1-3)	Timmons Arena (1,862); Greenville, SC
1/13/2011; 7:00 pm		Chattanooga	L 68-69	5-12 (1-4)	McAlister Field House; Charleston, SC
1/15/2011; 7:00 pm		at College of Charleston	L 66-87	5-13 (1-5)	Carolina First Arena (5,162); Charleston, SC
1/17/2011; 7:00 pm		at Samford	W 61-50	6-13 (2-5)	Pete Hanna Center (744); Birmingham, AL
1/20/2011; 7:00 pm		Appalachian State	W 81-63	7-13 (3-5)	McAlister Field House (1,519); Charleston, SC
1/22/2011; 7:00 pm		Western Carolina	W 68-46	8-13 (4-5)	McAlister Field House (2,143); Charleston, SC
1/26/2011; 7:00 pm		at Davidson	W 85-75	9-13 (5-5)	John M. Belk Arena (3,458); Davidson, NC
2/3/2011; 7:00 pm		Furman	L 55-59	9-14 (5-6)	McAlister Field House (2,289); Charleston, SC
2/5/2011; 7:00 pm		Wofford	L 60-74	9-15 (5-7)	McAlister Field House (2,206); Charleston, SC
2/7/2011; 7:00 pm		at UNC Greensboro	L 74-86	9-16 (5-8)	Fleming Gymnasium (2,481); Greensboro, NC
2/12/2011; 7:00 pm		Elon	L 72-79	9-17 (5-9)	McAlister Field House (1,511); Charleston, SC
2/14/2011*; 7:00 pm		Savannah State	L 61-65 ^{OT}	9-18	McAlister Field House (1,347); Charleston, SC
2/17/2011; 7:00 pm		College of Charleston	L 63-85	9-19 (5-10)	McAlister Field House (4,131); Charleston, SC
2/19/2011; 7:00 pm		at Georgia Southern	L 53-65	9-22 (5-11)	Hanner Fieldhouse (1,406); Statesboro, GA
2/24/2011; 7:00 pm		at Western Carolina	W 70-62	10-20 (6-11)	Ramsey Center (1,573); Cullowhee, NC
2/26/2011; 7:00 pm		at Appalachian State	L 59-70	10-21 (6-12)	Holmes Center (2,356); Boone, NC
SoCon Tournament
3/4/2011; 7:00 pm	(S5)	vs. (N4) Elon	L 74-85	10-22	McKenzie Arena (2,967); Chattanooga, TN
*Non-conference game. ^{#}Rankings from AP Poll. (#) Tournament seedings in parentheses. All times are in Eastern Time.
