= 2004 Southern Conference men's basketball tournament =

- Classification: Division I
- Season: 2003–04
- Teams: 12
- Site: North Charleston Coliseum; North Charleston, SC
- Champions: East Tennessee State (6th title)
- Winning coach: Murry Bartow (1st title)
- MVP: Tim Smith (East Tennessee State)
- Top scorer: Tim Smith (East Tennessee State) (78 points)

2003–04 Southern Conference men's basketball standings
	Conf.				Overall
Team	W		L	PCT	W		L	PCT
North
East Tennessee State †	15	–	1	.938	27	–	6	.818
Chattanooga	10	–	6	.625	19	–	11	.633
Elon	7	–	9	.438	12	–	18	.400
UNC Greensboro	7	–	9	.438	11	–	17	.393
Western Carolina	6	–	10	.375	13	–	15	.464
Appalachian State	4	–	12	.250	9	–	21	.300
South
Georgia Southern	11	–	5	.688	21	–	8	.724
College of Charleston	11	–	5	.688	20	–	9	.690
Davidson	11	–	5	.688	17	–	12	.586
Furman	8	–	8	.500	17	–	12	.586
Wofford	4	–	12	.250	9	–	20	.310
The Citadel	2	–	14	.125	6	–	22	.214
† SoCon Tournament winner As of April 30, 2004; Rankings from AP poll

The 2004 Southern Conference men's basketball tournament took place from March 3–6, 2004 at the North Charleston Coliseum in North Charleston, South Carolina. The East Tennessee State Buccaneers defeated their in-state rival Chattanooga in the championship game to win their sixth title in school history and receive the automatic berth to the 2004 NCAA tournament. Tim Smith of ETSU was named the tournament's Most Valuable Player.

== Format ==
All twelve teams were eligible for the tournament. The tournament used a preset bracket consisting of four rounds, the first of which featured four games, with the winners moving on to the quarterfinal round. The top two finishers in each division received first round byes, and the division winners were seeded first and second overall.

== Bracket ==
First round March 3
4S	Furman	73
5N	Western Carolina	68
3N	Elon	66
6S	The Citadel	56
4N	UNC Greensboro	82
5S	Wofford	85*
3S	College of Charleston	71
6N	Appalachian State	61

Quarterfinals; March 4
1N	East Tennessee St.	94
4S	Furman	84
2S	Davidson	68
3N	Elon	61
1S	Georgia Southern	82
5S	Wofford	69
2N	Chattanooga	89
3S	College of Charleston	78

Semifinals; March 5
1N	East Tennessee St.	96
2S	Davidson	84
1S	Georgia Southern	87
2N	Chattanooga	90*

Championship Game; March 6
1N	East Tennessee St.	78
2N	Chattanooga	62

* Overtime game

== See also ==
- List of Southern Conference men's basketball champions
