= Missouri Valley Football Conference =

U.S. college football-only conference

- Current season, competition or edition: 2026 Missouri Valley Football Conference season
- Formerly: Gateway Football Conference (1992–2008); Gateway Collegiate Athletic Conference (1982–1992)
- Association: NCAA
- Founded: 1982 (chartered); 1985 (began football)
- Commissioner: Jeff Jackson (since 2025)
- Sports fielded: 1 (football); men's: 1; women's: 0
- Division: Division I
- Subdivision: FCS
- No. of teams: 9
- Headquarters: St. Louis, Missouri
- Region: Midwest
- Website: www.valley-football.org

Locations

The Missouri Valley Football Conference (MVFC), formerly the Gateway Football Conference, is a collegiate athletic conference which operates in the Midwestern United States. It participates in the NCAA's Division I Football Championship Subdivision (FCS) as a football-only conference.

== History ==
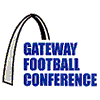
Gateway Conference logo

The Missouri Valley Football Conference has a complex history that involves three other conferences:

- Missouri Valley Conference (MVC): A long-established conference, in existence since 1907, that sponsored football until 1985. In its last years as a football conference, it was a hybrid league that included teams in NCAA Divisions I-A (today's FBS) and I-AA (now FCS).
- Gateway Collegiate Athletic Conference (Gateway): A women's sports conference founded in 1982 by MVC member schools.
- Association of Mid-Continent Universities (AMCU): An all-sports conference, also founded in 1982, that sponsored football at the I-AA level through the 1984 season. The AMCU had absorbed the Mid-Continent Athletic Association, a football-only league founded in 1978. (After dropping football, the AMCU later became the Mid-Continent Conference, and is now The Summit League.)

In 1985, the MVC stopped sponsoring football. At that time, the two remaining I-AA members from the MVC (Illinois State and Southern Illinois) joined Eastern Illinois, Northern Iowa, Southwest Missouri State, and Western Illinois from the AMCU and together became a football conference under Gateway's auspices. Indiana State, which had left MVC football after the 1981 season to become a Division I-AA independent while remaining a full MVC member, would join the next year.

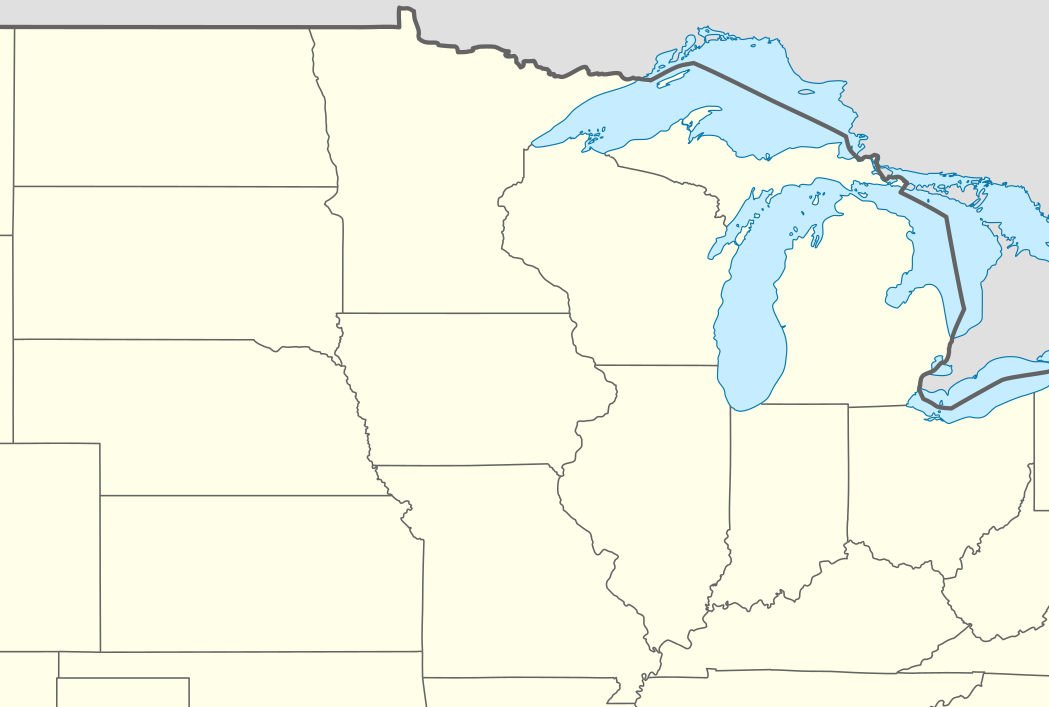
Locations of Missouri Valley Football Conference Members
– Horizon League member
– Missouri Valley Conference member
– Summit League member

In 1992, when the Gateway Collegiate Athletic Conference merged with the MVC, the football conference kept the Gateway charter, with a minor name change to Gateway Football Conference. After Eastern Illinois joined the Ohio Valley Conference for football in 1996, Youngstown State joined in 1997 and was followed by Western Kentucky University in 2001. Southwest Missouri State changed its name to Missouri State in 2005.

Western Kentucky moved to the Division I Football Bowl Subdivision (FBS; formerly Division I-A) after the 2006 season, leaving the GFC with seven members for the 2007 season. Great West Football Conference members North Dakota State and South Dakota State were invited to join the conference beginning with the 2008 season. Subsequently, the Gateway Football Conference changed its name to the Missouri Valley Football Conference in June 2008. This change aligned the conference with the Missouri Valley Conference, a conference in which five of the nine Missouri Valley Football schools were (and still are) all-sports members. The conferences continue to share the "Missouri Valley" name, and space in the same building in St. Louis, but remained separate administratively until 2025, and are still separate legal entities.

The University of South Dakota joined as the 10th member in 2012. The University of North Dakota joined as the 11th member in 2020, bringing back the yearly rivalries among North Dakota, North Dakota State, South Dakota and South Dakota State which had existed under the Division II North Central Conference that NDSU and SDSU left in 2004–05.

On April 4, 2022, Murray State University, who had previously been announced as a new MVC member effective in July 2022, joined the MVFC in 2023, bringing the league up to a record high of 12 active members. This was short-lived however, as on May 12, 2023, founding member Western Illinois University announced that they would be leaving the MVFC and their full time conference, the Summit League, for the Ohio Valley Conference beginning in fall 2023 and 2024. They would leave the Summit beginning in fall 2023, and would leave the Valley after the conclusion of the 2023 football season. Almost exactly a year after that, on May 10, 2024, fellow founding member Missouri State University announced that they accepted an invitation to join Conference USA in all sports, beginning with the 2025-26 academic year.

On May 5, 2025, the conference announced a new governance structure that took effect on July 1, 2025 following longtime commissioner Patty Viverito's retirement on June 30. The new structure placed current Missouri Valley Conference commissioner Jeff Jackson as the new MVFC commissioner and current Summit League commissioner Josh Fenton as an executive advisor to the conference. This move marked the conference's only leadership change in its 40-year history. With this move, the MVFC was then formally connected to both primary conferences for 9 of the 10 conference members (Youngstown State is a member of the Horizon League) at the time.

On February 9, 2026, North Dakota State University announced they were leaving the conference to join the Mountain West Conference effective July 1, 2026 after 18 years in the MVFC.

== Member schools ==
=== Current members ===
Institution	Location	Founded	Joined	Type	Enrollment	Endowment	Nickname	Colors	Current primary conference
Illinois State University	Normal, Illinois	1857	1985	Public	20,989	$270 million	Redbirds		Missouri Valley
Indiana State University	Terre Haute, Indiana	1865	1986	Public	12,144	$103.1 million	Sycamores		Missouri Valley
Murray State University	Murray, Kentucky	1922	2023	Public	9,427	$90.8 million	Racers		Missouri Valley
University of North Dakota	Grand Forks, North Dakota	1883	2020	Public	15,908	$510.7 million	Fighting Hawks		Summit
University of Northern Iowa	Cedar Falls, Iowa	1876	1985	Public	10,497	$163 million	Panthers		Missouri Valley
University of South Dakota	Vermillion, South Dakota	1862	2012	Public	10,040	$328.5 million	Coyotes		Summit
South Dakota State University	Brookings, South Dakota	1881	2008	Public	11,901	$308.2 million	Jackrabbits		Summit
Southern Illinois University	Carbondale, Illinois	1869	1985	Public	11,366	$190.1 million	Salukis		Missouri Valley
Youngstown State University	Youngstown, Ohio	1908	1997	Public	12,155	$321.5 million	Penguins		Horizon

=== Former members ===
Institution	Location	Founded	Joined	Left	Type	Nickname	Colors	Primary conference during tenure in the MVFC	Current primary conference	Current football conference
Eastern Illinois University	Charleston, Illinois	1895	1985	1995	Public	Panthers		Mid-Continent	Ohio Valley	
Missouri State University	Springfield, Missouri	1905	1985	2025	Public	Bears		Missouri Valley	CUSA	
North Dakota State University	Fargo, North Dakota	1890	2008	2026	Public	Bison		Summit		Mountain West
Western Illinois University	Macomb, Illinois	1899	1985	2024	Public	Leathernecks		Summit	Ohio Valley	
Western Kentucky University	Bowling Green, Kentucky	1906	2001	2007	Public	Hilltoppers		Sun Belt	CUSA	

=== Membership timeline ===
Current members Former members Dual members (list additional conferences)

== Conference champions ==
12 different teams have won MVFC championships. The most recent champion is North Dakota State, their 12th. The school with the most championships is Northern Iowa, with 16 (10 of them outright).

== NCAA Football Championship Subdivision national championships ==
Team	Titles	Title Years	Finals	Runner-up
North Dakota State^{#}	10	2011, 2012, 2013, 2014, 2015, 2017, 2018, 2019, 2021, 2024	11	2022
Youngstown State	4	1991, 1993, 1994, 1997	7	1992, 1999, 2016
South Dakota State	2	2022, 2023	3	2020
Southern Illinois	1	1983	1	
Western Kentucky^{♯}	1	2002	1	
Illinois State	0		2	2014, 2025
Northern Iowa	0		1	2005

# Now a member of the Football Bowl Subdivision (FBS).

== Records ==
=== Overall winning streaks ===
#	Team	Streak	Spoiler	Season(s)
1.	North Dakota State	39 †	Southern Illinois	2017–2020
2.	North Dakota State	33	Northern Iowa	2012–2014
3.	South Dakota State	29	Oklahoma State	2022–2024
4.	North Dakota State	16	Illinois State	2024–2025
5.	North Dakota State	14	South Dakota State	2015–2016
6.	Western Kentucky	13	Auburn	2002–2003
6.	Northern Iowa	13	Delaware	2006–2007

† FCS Record
Former member

==== Consecutive conference wins ====
1. North Dakota State, 19 (2017–2020)
2. South Dakota State, 19 (2022–2024)
3. North Dakota State, 18 (2012–2014)

== Facilities ==
School	Stadium	Capacity
Illinois State	Hancock Stadium	13,391
Indiana State	Memorial Stadium	12,764
Murray State	Roy Stewart Stadium	16,800
North Dakota	Alerus Center	12,283
Northern Iowa	UNI-Dome	16,324
South Dakota	DakotaDome	9,100
South Dakota State	Dana J. Dykhouse Stadium	19,300
Southern Illinois	Saluki Stadium	15,000
Youngstown State	Stambaugh Stadium	20,630
