= 2011 Southern Conference men's basketball tournament =

- Classification: Division I
- Season: 2010–11
- Teams: 12
- Site: McKenzie Arena; Chattanooga, Tennessee
- Champions: Wofford (2nd title)
- Winning coach: Mike Young (2nd title)
- MVP: Noah Dahlman (Wofford)
- Attendance: 3,374 (Championship game)
- Television: SportSouth, ESPN2

2010–11 Southern Conference men's basketball standings
	Conf.				Overall
Team	W		L	PCT	W		L	PCT
North
Western Carolina	12	–	6	.667	18	–	15	.545
Chattanooga	12	–	6	.667	16	–	16	.500
Appalachian State	10	–	8	.556	16	–	15	.516
Elon	7	–	11	.389	14	–	17	.452
UNC Greensboro	6	–	12	.333	7	–	24	.226
Samford	4	–	14	.222	12	–	19	.387
South
College of Charleston	14	–	4	.778	25	–	10	.714
Wofford†	14	–	4	.778	21	–	13	.618
Furman	12	–	6	.667	22	–	11	.667
Davidson	10	–	8	.556	18	–	15	.545
The Citadel	6	–	12	.333	10	–	22	.313
Georgia Southern	1	–	17	.056	5	–	27	.156
† SoCon Tournament winner As of March 31, 2011; Rankings from AP Poll

The 2011 Southern Conference men's basketball tournament took place between Friday, March 4 and Monday, March 7 in Chattanooga, Tennessee, at McKenzie Arena. The semifinals were televised by SportSouth, with the Southern Conference Championship Game televised by ESPN2. The championship matched the two teams with the best conference records, College of Charleston and Wofford. Although College of Charleston had won both regular season meetings against Wofford, the Terriers defeated the Cougars in the championship game, 77–67, to secure their bid to the 2011 NCAA Men's Division I Basketball Tournament, Wofford's second straight appearance.

== Standings ==
North
School	W	L
Western Carolina	12	6
Chattanooga	12	6
Appalachian State	10	8
Elon	7	11
UNC Greensboro	6	12
Samford	4	14
South
School	W	L
College of Charleston	14	4
Wofford	14	4
Furman	12	6
Davidson	10	8
The Citadel	6	12
Georgia Southern	1	17

Tiebreakers:

Western Carolina and Chattanooga split their season series. Western Carolina was 2–0 against third-place Appalachian State, while Chattanooga was 1–1.

College of Charleston swept the season series with Wofford, 2–0.

== Bracket ==
First Round; Friday, March 4
S4	Davidson	64
N5	UNC Greensboro	71
N3	Appalachian State	65
S6	Georgia Southern	57
S3	Furman	61
N6	Samford	48
N4	Elon	85
S5	The Citadel	74

Quarterfinals; Saturday, March 5
N1	Western Carolina	77
N5	UNC Greensboro	66
S2	Wofford	69
N3	Appalachian State	56
N2	Chattanooga	52
S3	Furman	61
S1	College of Charleston	78
N4	Elon	60

Semifinals; Sunday, March 6
N1	Western Carolina	72
S2	Wofford	86
S3	Furman	58
S1	College of Charleston	63

Championship Game; Monday, March 7
S2	Wofford	77
S1	College of Charleston	67

Asterisk denotes game ended in overtime.

== All-Tournament Team ==
First Team
Andrew Goudelock, College of Charleston
Donovan Monroe, College of Charleston
Jamar Diggs, Wofford
Cameron Rundles, Wofford
Noah Dahlman, Wofford

Second Team
Trent Wiedeman, College of Charleston
Jordan Miller, Furman
Amu Saaka, Furman
Harouna Mutombo, Western Carolina
Mike Williams, Western Carolina
