= 2011 Atlantic Sun men's basketball tournament =

- 2011 Atlantic Sun Tournament Logo
- Classification: Division I
- Season: 2010–11
- Teams: 8
- Site: University Center; Macon, Georgia
- Champions: Belmont Bruins (4th title)
- Winning coach: Rick Byrd (4th title)

2010–11 Atlantic Sun men's basketball standings
	Conf.				Overall
Team	W		L	PCT	W		L	PCT
† Belmont	19	–	1	.950	30	–	5	.857
East Tennessee State	16	–	4	.800	24	–	12	.667
Jacksonville	13	–	7	.650	20	–	12	.625
Lipscomb	12	–	8	.600	17	–	13	.567
Mercer	11	–	9	.550	15	–	18	.455
North Florida	10	–	10	.500	15	–	19	.441
Florida Gulf Coast	7	–	13	.350	10	–	20	.333
Campbell	6	–	14	.300	12	–	19	.387
Kennesaw State	6	–	14	.300	8	–	23	.258
Stetson	6	–	14	.300	8	–	23	.258
USC Upstate	4	–	16	.200	5	–	25	.167
† 2011 Atlantic Sun Tournament winner Rankings from AP Poll

The 2011 Atlantic Sun men's basketball tournament was the 33rd edition of the Atlantic Sun Conference (A-Sun)'s Men's Basketball Tournament. It took place from March 2–5, 2011 at the University Center on the campus of Mercer University in Macon, Georgia. The Belmont University Bruins won the tournament, defeating the University of North Florida Ospreys 87-46 in the final.

== Format ==
The top eight eligible men's basketball teams in the Atlantic Sun Conference received a berth in the conference tournament. After the 20-game conference season, teams are seeded by conference record. Florida Gulf Coast University and the University of South Carolina Upstate were not eligible to compete due to NCAA reclassification.

== Bracket ==
Quarterfinals, March 2 & 3
1	Belmont	72
8	Kennesaw State	57
4	Lipscomb	63
5	Mercer	73
3	Jacksonville	64
6	North Florida	68
2	ETSU	54
7	Campbell	53

Semifinals, March 4
1	Belmont	80
5	Mercer	72
6	North Florida	59
2	ETSU	55

Championship, March 5
1	Belmont	87
6	North Florida	46

Asterisk denotes game ended in overtime.
