= 2003–04 East Tennessee State Buccaneers men's basketball team =

American college basketball season

2003–04 East Tennessee State Buccaneers men's basketball
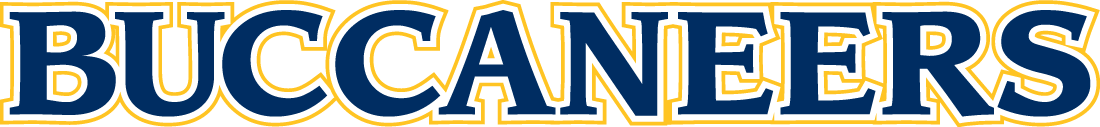

SoCon tournament champion

NCAA tournament
- Conference: Southern Conference
- Record: 27–6 (15–1 SoCon)
- Head coach: Murry Bartow (1st season)
- Home arena: Memorial Center

2003–04 Southern Conference men's basketball standings
	Conf.				Overall
Team	W		L	PCT	W		L	PCT
North
East Tennessee State †	15	–	1	.938	27	–	6	.818
Chattanooga	10	–	6	.625	19	–	11	.633
Elon	7	–	9	.438	12	–	18	.400
UNC Greensboro	7	–	9	.438	11	–	17	.393
Western Carolina	6	–	10	.375	13	–	15	.464
Appalachian State	4	–	12	.250	9	–	21	.300
South
Georgia Southern	11	–	5	.688	21	–	8	.724
College of Charleston	11	–	5	.688	20	–	9	.690
Davidson	11	–	5	.688	17	–	12	.586
Furman	8	–	8	.500	17	–	12	.586
Wofford	4	–	12	.250	9	–	20	.310
The Citadel	2	–	14	.125	6	–	22	.214
† SoCon Tournament winner As of April 30, 2004; Rankings from AP poll

The 2003–04 East Tennessee State Buccaneers men's basketball team represented East Tennessee State University in the 2003–04 NCAA Division I men's basketball season. The Buccaneers, led by first-year head coach Murry Bartow, played their home games at the Memorial Center in Johnson City, Tennessee, as members of the Southern Conference. After finishing first in the conference regular season standings, the Buccaneers won the SoCon tournament to earn an automatic bid to the NCAA tournament as No. 13 seed in the Atlanta region. East Tennessee State was beaten by No. 4 seed Cincinnati in the opening round, 80–77.

== Roster ==
2003–04 East Tennessee State Buccaneers men's basketball team
Players
Coaches

Pos.	#	Name	Height	Weight	Year	Hometown
F	1	Jerald Fields	6 ft 7 in (2.01 m)	260 lb (118 kg)	Sr	Gainesville, Florida
G	2	Sam Oatman	6 ft 1 in (1.85 m)	175 lb (79 kg)	Jr	Neenah, Wisconsin
G	4	Ben Rhoda	6 ft 4 in (1.93 m)	195 lb (88 kg)	So	Dayton, Ohio
G	5	Tim Smith	5 ft 9 in (1.75 m)	155 lb (70 kg)	So	Newport News, Virginia
G	20	James Anthony	6 ft 3 in (1.91 m)	185 lb (84 kg)	Jr	Brandon, Florida
G	23	Michael Tolliver	6 ft 3 in (1.91 m)	210 lb (95 kg)	Jr	Bremo Bluff, Virginia
F	32	AJ Jackson	6 ft 6 in (1.98 m)	240 lb (109 kg)	Fr	Monessen, Pennsylvania
F	32	Travis Strong	6 ft 2 in (1.88 m)	210 lb (95 kg)	Fr	Memphis, Tennessee
F	34	Aaron Scott	6 ft 6 in (1.98 m)	195 lb (88 kg)	Fr	Houma, Louisiana
F	41	Howard Bridgers	6 ft 6 in (1.98 m)	245 lb (111 kg)	So	Wilson, North Carolina
F	44	Zakee Wadood	6 ft 6 in (1.98 m)	220 lb (100 kg)	Sr	Lonoke, Arkansas
C	51	Brad Nuckles	6 ft 9 in (2.06 m)	250 lb (113 kg)	So	Council, Virginia

Head coach

- Murry Bartow (UAB)

Assistant coach(es)

Legend

- (C) Team captain
- (S) Suspended
- (I) Ineligible
- (W) Walk-on
- Injured
- Current redshirt

Roster

== Schedule and results ==
Date time, TV	Rank^{#}	Opponent^{#}	Result	Record	Site (attendance) city, state
Regular season
Nov 21, 2003*		at Houston; Preseason NIT	W 65–51	1–0	Hofheinz Pavilion; Houston, Texas
Nov 23, 2003*		at Texas Tech; Preseason NIT	L 53–64	1–1	United Spirit Arena; Lubbock, Texas
Nov 25, 2003*		Mars Hill	W 100–57	2–1	Memorial Center; Johnson City, Tennessee
Nov 29, 2003*		UNC Wilmington	W 67–62	3–1	Memorial Center; Johnson City, Tennessee
Dec 3, 2003*		at UNC Asheville	W 78–56	4–1	Justice Center; Asheville, North Carolina
Dec 6, 2003		Georgia Southern	W 91–85	5–1 (1–0)	Memorial Center; Johnson City, Tennessee
Dec 15, 2003*		at Clemson	L 86–100 ^{OT}	5–2	Littlejohn Coliseum; Clemson, South Carolina
Dec 17, 2003*		at Tennessee Tech	W 77–70	6–2	Eblen Center; Cookeville, Tennessee
Dec 20, 2003*		Virginia–Wise	W 81–55	7–2	Memorial Center; Johnson City, Tennessee
Dec 27, 2003*		vs. IUPUI; Rainbow Classic	L 81–85	7–3	Stan Sheriff Center; Honolulu, Hawaii
Dec 29, 2003*		vs. Lamar; Rainbow Classic	W 75–62	8–3	Stan Sheriff Center; Honolulu, Hawaii
Dec 30, 2003*		vs. American; Rainbow Classic	L 66–71	8–4	Stan Sheriff Center; Honolulu, Hawaii
Jan 5, 2004		at Furman	W 69–68	9–4 (2–0)	Timmons Arena; Greenville, South Carolina
Jan 10, 2004		at UNC Greensboro	W 72–68	10–4 (3–0)	Fleming Gymnasium; Greensboro, North Carolina
Jan 12, 2004*		Union (KY)	W 100–62	11–4	Memorial Center; Johnson City, Tennessee
Jan 17, 2004		Western Carolina	W 95–82	12–4 (4–0)	Memorial Center; Johnson City, Tennessee
Jan 19, 2004		at Elon	W 75–72	13–4 (5–0)	Alumni Gym; Elon, North Carolina
Jan 21, 2004		Davidson	W 75–70	14–4 (6–0)	Memorial Center; Johnson City, Tennessee
Jan 24, 2004		at Appalachian State	W 93–80	15–4 (7–0)	Holmes Center; Boone, North Carolina
Jan 28, 2004		Wofford	W 76–54	16–4 (8–0)	Memorial Center; Johnson City, Tennessee
Jan 31, 2004		at Western Carolina	W 79–65	17–4 (9–0)	Ramsey Center; Cullowhee, North Carolina
Feb 2, 2004		UNC Greensboro	W 86–65	18–4 (10–0)	Memorial Center; Johnson City, Tennessee
Feb 7, 2004		Appalachian State	W 66–63	19–4 (11–0)	Memorial Center; Johnson City, Tennessee
Feb 9, 2004		at Chattanooga	W 82–80	20–4 (12–0)	McKenzie Arena; Chattanooga, Tennessee
Feb 14, 2004		Elon	W 73–58	21–4 (13–0)	Memorial Center; Johnson City, Tennessee
Feb 16, 2004		at The Citadel	W 73–51	22–4 (14–0)	McAlister Field House; Charleston, South Carolina
Feb 21, 2004*		at Fresno State	W 66–62	23–4	Save Mart Center; Fresno, California
Feb 24, 2004		Chattanooga	W 84–72	24–4 (15–0)	Memorial Center; Johnson City, Tennessee
Feb 28, 2004		at College of Charleston	L 89–91	24–5 (15–1)	F. Mitchell Johnson Center; Charleston, South Carolina
SoCon tournament
Mar 4, 2004*	(1N)	vs. (4S) Furman; Quarterfinals	W 94–84	25–5	North Charleston Coliseum; North Charleston, South Carolina
Mar 5, 2004*	(1N)	vs. (2S) Davidson; Semifinals	W 96–84	26–5	North Charleston Coliseum; North Charleston, South Carolina
Mar 6, 2004*	(1N)	vs. (2N) Chattanooga; Championship game	W 78–62	27–5	North Charleston Coliseum; North Charleston, South Carolina
NCAA tournament
Mar 19, 2004*	(13 ATL)	vs. (4 ATL) No. 11 Cincinnati; First round	L 77–80	27–6	Nationwide Arena; Columbus, Ohio
*Non-conference game. ^{#}Rankings from AP poll. (#) Tournament seedings in parentheses. ATL=Atlanta. N=North. S=South. All times are in Eastern.

== Awards and honors ==
- Zakee Wadood – SoCon Player of the Year
- Murry Bartow – SoCon Coach of the Year
