= Jeff Jackson (basketball) =

American college athletics administrator and college basketball coach

Biographical details
- Born: May 1, 1961 (age 65); New York City, New York, U.S.

Coaching career (HC unless noted)
- 1983–1985: Cornell (assistant)
- 1985–1986: USC (assistant)
- 1986–1989: St. Bonaventure (assistant)
- 1989–1992: Colorado State (assistant)
- 1992–1996: Stanford (assistant)
- 1996–1999: New Hampshire
- 1999–2006: Vanderbilt (assistant)
- 2006–2013: Furman

Head coaching record
- Overall: 106–191

Jeff Jackson (born May 1, 1961) is an American college athletics administrator and American college basketball coach and the former head men's basketball coach at Furman University. He previously held the same position at the University of New Hampshire.

He was hired by Furman on April 24, 2006, after serving as an assistant coach to Kevin Stallings at Vanderbilt University, of the Southeastern Conference. While an assistant at Vanderbilt, Vanderbilt made one NCAA "Sweet Sixteen" appearance (2004) by defeating Western Michigan and North Carolina State, before falling to eventual national champion, Connecticut. Jackson was also named one of the Top 25 College Basketball Recruiters by Rivals.com in 2004. During Jackson's tenure as an assistant at Vanderbilt, the Commodores totaled 4 NIT appearances and 1 NCAA appearance.

Prior to his stint with Vanderbilt, Jackson was the head coach at the University of New Hampshire, where he coached for three seasons, compiling a record of 21-60. During the 1997-98 season, New Hampshire had only their third ten win season since 1984. The 1998–99 recruiting class was ranked 15th by Mike Sheridan of Eastern Basketball Magazine, the first time that the university's basketball program had ever received a regional ranking in its history.

Before being introduced as the head coach at New Hampshire, he served as an assistant at Stanford University of the Pac-10 Conference. There, the Cardinal won twenty games twice, and received back to back NCAA tournament appearances for the first time in school history.

Prior to his move to Stanford, Jackson served in assistant coaching capacities at Colorado State (1989–92), and St. Bonaventure (1986–89). He began his coaching career as a graduate assistant at Southern California in 1985 after serving as a student assistant coach his final two years at Cornell.

Jackson resigned at Furman on March 22, 2013. He went on to serve as the deputy commissioner of the Big South Conference, then as the executive associate commissioner of the Big 12 Conference.

On March 17, 2021, Jackson was named the 10th commissioner of the Missouri Valley Conference (MVC), succeeding Doug Elgin after 33 years as commissioner.

Jackson was named the second commissioner of the Missouri Valley Football Conference (MVFC), a football-only league that plays in NCAA Division I Football Championship Subdivision (FCS), on May 5, 2025. He took office on July 1, replacing founding MVFC commissioner Patty Viverito, who retired after having served for 40 years.

== Personal life ==
Jackson graduated from Cornell in 1984 with a Bachelor of Science degree in industrial and labor relations. He and his wife Carolyn, also a graduate of Cornell, have three children: Xavier, Jenai, and Taylor.

== Head coaching record ==
Record table
Season	Team	Overall	Conference	Standing	Postseason
New Hampshire (America East Conference) (1996–1999)
1996–97	New Hampshire	7–20	5–13	9th	
1997–98	New Hampshire	10–17	6–12	8th	
1998–99	New Hampshire	4–23	2–16	10th	
New Hampshire:		21–60 (.259)	13–41 (.241)		
Furman Paladins (Southern Conference) (2006–2013)
2006–07	Furman	15–16	8–10	5th	
2007–08	Furman	7–23	6–14	7th	
2008–09	Furman	6–24	4–16	11th	
2009–10	Furman	13–17	7–11	7th	
2010–11	Furman	22–11	12–6	T–3rd	CIT First Round
2011–12	Furman	15–16	8–10	T–7th	
2012–13	Furman	7–24	3–15	12th	
Furman:		85–131 (.394)	48–82 (.369)		
Total:		106–191 (.357)			
