= 2010–11 Wofford Terriers men's basketball team =

American college basketball season

2010–11 Wofford Terriers men's basketball

SoCon Regular Season Co-Champions SoCon tournament champions

NCAA Tournament, Round of 64
- Conference: Southern Conference
- Record: 21–13 (14–4 SoCon)
- Head coach: Mike Young (9th season)
- Assistant coaches: Paul Harrison; Shane Nichols; Mark Prosser
- Home arena: Benjamin Johnson Arena

2010–11 Southern Conference men's basketball standings
	Conf.				Overall
Team	W		L	PCT	W		L	PCT
North
Western Carolina	12	–	6	.667	18	–	15	.545
Chattanooga	12	–	6	.667	16	–	16	.500
Appalachian State	10	–	8	.556	16	–	15	.516
Elon	7	–	11	.389	14	–	17	.452
UNC Greensboro	6	–	12	.333	7	–	24	.226
Samford	4	–	14	.222	12	–	19	.387
South
College of Charleston	14	–	4	.778	25	–	10	.714
Wofford†	14	–	4	.778	21	–	13	.618
Furman	12	–	6	.667	22	–	11	.667
Davidson	10	–	8	.556	18	–	15	.545
The Citadel	6	–	12	.333	10	–	22	.313
Georgia Southern	1	–	17	.056	5	–	27	.156
† SoCon Tournament winner As of March 31, 2011; Rankings from AP Poll

The 2010–11 Wofford Terriers men's basketball team represented Wofford College during the 2010–11 NCAA Division I men's basketball season. The Terriers, led by 9th year head coach Mike Young, played their home games at Benjamin Johnson Arena and are members of the Southern Conference. They finished the season 21–13, 14–4 in SoCon play. They were champions of the 2011 Southern Conference men's basketball tournament to earn their second consecutive automatic bid in the 2011 NCAA Division I men's basketball tournament where they lost in the second round to Brigham Young.

== Roster ==
Number	Name	Position	Height	Weight	Year	Hometown
1	Cameron Rundles	Guard	6–1	190	Senior	Minneapolis, Minnesota
2	Nathan Parker	Forward	6–6	200	Sophomore	Knoxville, Tennessee
5	Jamar Diggs	Guard	6–2	180	Senior	Minneapolis, Minnesota
10	Kevin Giltner	Guard	6–6	200	Junior	Kingston Springs, Tennessee
13	Taylor Wagener	Guard	6–3	185	Sophomore	Charlotte, North Carolina
14	Aerris Smith	Forward	6–7	240	Freshman	Charlotte, North Carolina
15	Matt Steelman	Guard	6–2	180	Junior	Central, South Carolina
21	Drew Crowell	Forward	6–9	230	Junior	Charleston, South Carolina
25	Joseph Tecklenburg	Forward	6–4	200	Junior	Charleston, South Carolina
35	Brad Loesing	Guard	6–0	180	Junior	Cincinnati, Ohio
40	Cameron McQueen	Center	6–8	245	Freshman	Charlotte, North Carolina
41	Tim Johnson	Forward	6–6	228	Senior	Memphis, Tennessee
42	Noah Dahlman	Forward	6–6	215	Senior	Braham, Minnesota
50	Terry Martin	Forward	6–6	235	Senior	Cincinnati, Ohio
53	Domas Rinksalis	Forward	6–9	220	Sophomore	Šiauliai, Lithuania

== Schedule ==
Date time, TV	Rank^{#}	Opponent^{#}	Result	Record	Site city, state
Regular season
Fri, Nov 12*; 8:00 pm		at Minnesota	L 55–69	0–1	Williams Arena; Minneapolis, MN
Mon, Nov 15*; 7:00 pm		at Clemson	L 70–78	0–2	Littlejohn Coliseum; Clemson, SC
Thu, Nov 18*; 2:30 pm		vs. USC Upstate; Charleston Classic Quarterfinals	W 79–61	1–2	Carolina First Arena; Charleston, SC
Fri, Nov 19*; 2:30 pm, ESPNU		vs. No. 20 Georgetown; Charleston Classic Semifinals	L 59–74	1–3	Carolina First Arena; Charleston, SC
Sun, Nov 21*; 5:30 pm, ESPNU		vs. George Mason; Charleston Classic Third Place	W 82–79 ^{OT}	2–3	Carolina First Arena; Charleston, SC
Wed, Nov 24*; 6:00 pm		Air Force	L 66–72 ^{OT}	2–4	Benjamin Johnson Arena; Spartanburg, SC
Sat, Nov 27*; 6:30 pm		at Xavier	L 90–94 ^{3OT}	2–5	Cintas Center; Cincinnati, OH
Thu, Dec 2; 7:00 pm		UNC Greensboro	W 92–70	3–5 (1–0)	Benjamin Johnson Arena; Spartanburg, SC
Sat, Dec 4; 7:00 pm		at Elon	W 75–69	4–5 (2–0)	Alumni Gym; Elon, NC
Sat, Dec 11*; 7:00 pm		at South Carolina	L 53–64	4–6	Colonial Life Arena; Columbia, SC
Sat, Dec 18*; 7:00 pm		High Point	W 79–65	5–6	Benjamin Johnson Arena; Spartanburg, SC
Wed, Dec 29*; 7:30 pm		at VCU; VCU Tournament	L 66–75	5–7	Stuart C. Siegel Center; Richmond, VA
Thu, Dec 30*; 5:00 pm		vs. Cornell; VCU Tournament	L 80–86	5–8	Stuart C. Siegel Center; Richmond, VA
Thu, Jan 6; 7:00 pm		The Citadel	W 78–60	6–8 (3–0)	Benjamin Johnson Arena; Spartanburg, SC
Sat, Jan 8; 6:00 pm, CSS		College of Charleston	L 73–77	6–9 (3–1)	Benjamin Johnson Arena; Spartanburg, SC
Wed, Jan 12; 8:00 pm		at Georgia Southern	W 74–65	7–9 (4–1)	Hanner Fieldhouse; Statesboro, GA
Sat, Jan 15; 7:00 pm		at Davidson	W 69–64	8–9 (5–1)	John M. Belk Arena; Davidson, NC
Thu, Jan 20; 7:00 pm		Chattanooga	W 88–56	9–9 (6–1)	Benjamin Johnson Arena; Spartanburg, SC
Sat, Jan 22; 2:00 pm		Samford	W 81–43	10–9 (7–1)	Benjamin Johnson Arena; Spartanburg, SC
Mon, Jan 24; 7:00 pm		Furman	L 68–73 ^{OT}	10–10 (7–2)	Benjamin Johnson Arena; Spartanburg, SC
Thu, Jan 27; 7:00 pm, SportSouth		at Appalachian State	W 74–65	11–10 (8–2)	Holmes Center; Boone, NC
Sat, Jan 29; 7:00 pm		Western Carolina	W 75–66	12–10 (9–2)	Benjamin Johnson Arena; Spartanburg, SC
Thu, Feb 3; 7:00 pm, ESPNU		at College of Charleston	L 54–79	12–11 (9–3)	Carolina First Arena; Charleston, SC
Sat, Feb 5; 7:00 pm		at The Citadel	W 74–60	13–11 (10–3)	McAlister Field House; Charleston, SC
Wed, Feb 9; 7:00 pm		Davidson	L 58–67	13–12 (10–4)	Benjamin Johnson Arena; Spartanburg, SC
Sat, Feb 12; 7:00 pm		Georgia Southern	W 69–61	14–12 (11–4)	Benjamin Johnson Arena; Spartanburg, SC
Wed, Feb 16; 8:00 pm		at Samford	W 81–68	15–12 (12–4)	Pete Hanna Center; Homewood, AL
Sat, Feb 19*; 7:00 pm		Ball State; ESPN BracketBusters	W 66–61	16–12	Benjamin Johnson Arena; Spartanburg, SC
Wed, Feb 23; 7:00 pm		at Chattanooga	W 97–58	17–12 (13–4)	McKenzie Arena; Chattanooga, TN
Sat, Feb 26; 2:00 pm, SportSouth		at Furman	W 79–65	18–12 (14–4)	Timmons Arena; Greenville, SC
SoCon tournament
Sat, Mar 5; 4:30 pm	(S2)	vs. (N3) Appalachian State; SoCon Quarterfinals	W 69–56	19–12	McKenzie Arena; Chattanooga, TN
Sun, Mar 6; 6:00 pm, SportSouth	(S2)	vs. (N1) Western Carolina; SoCon Semifinals	W 86–72	20–12	McKenzie Arena; Chattanooga, TN
Mon, Mar 7; 9:00 pm, ESPN2	(S2)	vs. (S1) College of Charleston; SoCon Championship Game	W 77–67	21–12	McKenzie Arena; Chattanooga, TN
NCAA tournament
Thu, Mar 17*; 7:15 pm, CBS	(14 SE)	vs. (3 SE) No. 10 BYU; NCAA Second Round	L 66–74	21–13	Pepsi Center; Denver, CO
*Non-conference game. ^{#}Rankings from AP Poll. (#) Tournament seedings in parentheses. SE=NCAA Southeast Regional. All times are in Eastern Time.
