= 1995 Sun Belt Conference men's basketball tournament =

- Classification: Division I
- Season: 1994–95
- Teams: 10
- Site: Barton Coliseum; Little Rock, AR
- Champions: Western Kentucky (2nd title)
- Winning coach: Matt Kilcullen (1st title)
- MVP: Chris Robinson (Western Kentucky)

1994–95 Sun Belt Conference men's basketball standings
	Conf.				Overall
Team	W		L	PCT	W		L	PCT
No. 21 Western Kentucky †	17	–	1	.944	27	–	4	.871
New Orleans	13	–	5	.722	20	–	11	.645
Jacksonville	12	–	6	.667	18	–	9	.667
Texas–Pan American	10	–	8	.556	14	–	14	.500
Louisiana Tech	9	–	9	.500	14	–	13	.519
Arkansas-Little Rock	9	–	9	.500	17	–	12	.586
South Alabama	7	–	11	.389	9	–	18	.333
Lamar	6	–	12	.333	11	–	16	.407
Southwestern Louisiana	4	–	14	.222	7	–	22	.241
Arkansas State	3	–	15	.167	8	–	20	.286
† 1995 Sun Belt Conference tournament winner Rankings from AP Poll

The 1995 Sun Belt Conference men's basketball tournament was held March 2–5 at Barton Coliseum in Little Rock, Arkansas.

Top-seeded Western Kentucky defeated hosts Arkansas–Little Rock in the championship game, 82–79, to win their second Sun Belt men's basketball tournament. It was WKU's second Sun Belt title in three years.

The Hilltoppers, in turn, received an automatic bid to the 1995 NCAA tournament. No other Sun Belt members were invited to the tournament.

== Format ==
No teams left or joined the Sun Belt before the season, leaving conference membership fixed at ten teams.

With all teams participating in the tournament this year, the field increased from nine to ten teams. With all teams seeded based on regular-season conference records, the top six teams were all placed directly into the quarterfinal round while the four lowest-seeded teams were placed into the preliminary first round.

== Bracket ==
First round Thursday, March 2
9	Southwestern Louisiana	57
8	Lamar	55
7	South Alabama	83
10	Arkansas State	96

Quarterfinals; Friday, March 3
1	Western Kentucky	87
9	Southwestern Louisiana	72
5	Louisiana Tech	48
4	Texas–Pan American	51
3	Jacksonville	76
6	Arkansas–Little Rock	99
10	Arkansas State	61
2	New Orleans	87

Semifinals; Saturday, March 4
1	Western Kentucky	64
4	Texas–Pan American	61
6	Arkansas–Little Rock	64
2	New Orleans	52

Championship; Sunday, March 5
1	Western Kentucky	82
6	Arkansas–Little Rock	79

== See also ==
- Sun Belt Conference women's basketball tournament
