= 1994–95 Western Kentucky Hilltoppers basketball team =

American college basketball season

1994–95 Western Kentucky Hilltoppers basketball

Sun Belt Conference tournament Champion Sun Belt Conference Champion

NCAA Tournament, second round
- Conference: Sun Belt Conference

Ranking
- AP: No. 21
- Record: 27–4 (17–1 Sun Belt)
- Head coach: Matt Kilcullen
- Home arena: E. A. Diddle Arena

1994–95 Sun Belt Conference men's basketball standings
	Conf.				Overall
Team	W		L	PCT	W		L	PCT
No. 21 Western Kentucky †	17	–	1	.944	27	–	4	.871
New Orleans	13	–	5	.722	20	–	11	.645
Jacksonville	12	–	6	.667	18	–	9	.667
Texas–Pan American	10	–	8	.556	14	–	14	.500
Louisiana Tech	9	–	9	.500	14	–	13	.519
Arkansas-Little Rock	9	–	9	.500	17	–	12	.586
South Alabama	7	–	11	.389	9	–	18	.333
Lamar	6	–	12	.333	11	–	16	.407
Southwestern Louisiana	4	–	14	.222	7	–	22	.241
Arkansas State	3	–	15	.167	8	–	20	.286
† 1995 Sun Belt Conference tournament winner Rankings from AP Poll

The 1994–95 Western Kentucky Hilltoppers men's basketball team represented Western Kentucky University during the 1994–95 NCAA Division I men's basketball season. The Hilltoppers were led by Sun Belt Conference Coach of the Year Matt Kilcullen and SBC Player of the Year Chris Robinson. The team won the Conference Championship and the Sun Belt Basketball tournament, earning a bid to the 1995 NCAA Division I men's basketball tournament for the third straight year. Darrin Horn joined Robinson on the All Conference Team. Robinson was the SBC Tournament MVP and Darius Hall and Jeff Rogers were named to the SBC All-Tournament team.

== Schedule ==
Date time, TV	Rank^{#}	Opponent^{#}	Result	Record	Site city, state
Regular season
12/3/1994		at Jacksonville	L 88–100 ^{2OT}	0–1 (0-1)	Swisher Gymnasium; Jacksonville, FL
12/6/1994*		at Ball State	W 84–77	1–1	Worthen Arena; Muncie, IN
12/10/1994*		Belmont	W 113–79	2–1	E. A. Diddle Arena; Bowling Green, KY
12/17/1994*		at No. 5 Massachusetts	L 72–91	2–2	Mullins Center; Amherst, MA
12/21/1994*		at Eastern Kentucky	W 82–77	3–2	Alumni Coliseum; Richmond, KY
12/28/1994*		UAB	W 78–54	4–2	E. A. Diddle Arena; Bowling Green, KY
1/5/1995		Arkansas State	W 88–68	5–2 (1-1)	E. A. Diddle Arena; Bowling Green, KY
1/7/1995		SW Louisiana	W 83–74	6–2 (2-1)	E. A. Diddle Arena; Bowling Green, KY
1/11/1995		at South Alabama	W 85–64	7–2 (3-1)	Mitchell Center; Mobile, AL
1/13/1995		at New Orleans	W 81–57	8–2 (4-1)	Lakefront Arena; New Orleans, LA
1/16/1995		Lamar	W 95–61	9–2 (5-1)	E. A. Diddle Arena; Bowling Green, KY
1/19/1995		at Louisiana Tech	W 68–49	10–2 (6-1)	Thomas Assembly Center; Ruston, LA
1/21/1995		at SW Louisiana	W 87–82	11–2 (7-1)	Cajundome; Lafayette, LA
1/26/1995		Jacksonville	W 76–72	12–2 (8-1)	E. A. Diddle Arena; Bowling Green, KY
1/28/1995		at Lamar	W 77–68	13–2 (9-1)	Montagne Center; Beaumont, TX
2/2/1995		at Texas–Pan American	W 83–67	14–2 (10-1)	UTPA Fieldhouse; Edinburg, TX
2/4/1995*		at Tulsa	L 68–70	14–3	Reynolds Center; Tulsa, OK
2/9/1995		Texas-Pan American	W 65–48	15–3 (11-1)	E. A. Diddle Arena; Bowling Green, KY
2/11/1995		Louisiana Tech	W 63–50	16–3 (12-1)	E. A. Diddle Arena; Bowling Green, KY
2/13/1995		New Orleans	W 67–59	17–3 (13-1)	E. A. Diddle Arena; Bowling Green, KY
2/16/1995		at Arkansas–Little Rock	W 70–68	18–3 (14-1)	Barton Coliseum; Little Rock, AR
2/18/1995		South Alabama	W 93–78	19–3 (15-1)	E. A. Diddle Arena; Bowling Green, KY
2/20/1995*		at Oral Roberts	W 83–71	20–3	Mabee Center; Tulsa, OK
2/23/1995		Arkansas–Little Rock	W 81–50	21–3 (16-1)	E. A. Diddle Arena; Bowling Green, KY
2/25/1995*		Tennessee State	W 86–80	22–3	E. A. Diddle Arena; Bowling Green, KY
2/27/1995		at Arkansas State	W 92–75	23–3 (17-1)	Convocation Center; Jonesboro, AR
1995 Sun Belt Conference men's basketball tournament
3/4/1995	(1) No. 23	vs. (9) SW Louisiana; Second Round	W 87–72	24–3	Barton Coliseum; Little Rock, AR
3/5/1995	(1) No. 23	vs. (4) Texas-Pan American; Semifinals	W 82–75	25–3	Barton Coliseum; Little Rock, AR
3/7/1995	(1) No. 23	at (6) Arkansas-Little Rock; Championship	W 82–79	26–3	Barton Coliseum; Little Rock, AR
1995 NCAA Division I men's basketball tournament
3/16/1995*	(8 MW) No. 21	vs. (9 MW) Michigan; Midwest Region First Round	W 82–76 ^{OT}	27–3	UD Arena; Dayton, OH
3/18/1995*	(8 MW) No. 21	vs. (1 MW) No. 5 Kansas; Midwest Region Second Round	L 70–75	27–4	UD Arena; Dayton, OH
*Non-conference game. ^{#}Rankings from AP Poll (M#) during NCAA Tournament is seed with Region. (#) Tournament seedings in parentheses.
