= Nik Cochran =

Canadian basketball player

Free agent
- Position: Point guard / shooting guard

Personal information
- Born: May 6, 1988 (age 38) Vancouver, British Columbia
- Listed height: 6 ft 3 in (1.91 m)
- Listed weight: 187 lb (85 kg)

Career information
- College: Davidson (2009–2013)
- NBA draft: 2013: undrafted
- Playing career: 2013–present

Career history
- 2013–2014: FIATC Joventut
- 2014–2015: UPEA Capo d'Orlando

Nikolas Max Valdez Cochran (born May 6, 1988) is a Canadian basketball player who also owns a British passport. He played four years for the Davidson Wildcats, and then turned professional. During his first professional season, he played for FIATC Joventut of the Spanish ACB. For the 2014–15 season, Cochran signed with the Dutch champion Donar, though he was cut before the start of the season. He played for UPEA Capo d'Orlando of the Lega Basket Serie A after signing a one-week tryout contract. His contract wasn't renewed.

Cochran has among the all-time NCAA top 25 career free throw percentages (Minimum 300 free throws made and 2.5 free throws made per game) with a 358–401=89.3% (17th according to the 2022–23 NCAA Record book).
