= Matt Kilcullen =

Athletic director (born 1954)

Biographical details
- Born: October 31, 1954 (age 71)

Playing career
- 1972–1976: Lehman

Coaching career (HC unless noted)
- 1978–1979: Delaware Valley (asst.)
- 1979–1982: Castleton State
- 1982–1985: Siena (asst.)
- 1985–1991: Notre Dame (asst.)
- 1991–1994: Jacksonville
- 1994–1998: Western Kentucky
- 1998–1999: Manhattan (asst.)
- 1999–2009: North Florida

Head coaching record
- Overall: 209–337 (.383)
- Tournaments: 1–1 (NCAA Division I)

Accomplishments and honors

Championships
- Sun Belt tournament (1995); Sun Belt regular season (1995)

Awards
- 2× Sun Belt Coach of the Year (1994, 1995)

Matt Kilcullen (born October 31, 1954) is an American Director of Athletics at Mercy College, formerly college basketball coach and athletics administrator at the University of North Florida.

== Career ==
He served as head coach of men's basketball at four schools, Castleton State College (1979–1982), Jacksonville University (1991–1994), Western Kentucky University (1994–1998), and the University of North Florida (1999–2009), and was assistant coach at several others. He was the first coach of the North Florida Ospreys in their transition to Division I. In April 2009, he was relieved of his position by the university's new athletic director, Lee Moon, and subsequently took an administrative position in the school's athletics department. He was replaced as head coach by Matthew Driscoll.

== Head coaching record ==
Record table
| Season | Team | Overall | Conference | Standing | Postseason |
|---|---|---|---|---|---|
Castleton State Spartans (Mayflower Conference) (1979–1982)
| 1979–80 | Castleton State | 2–20 | | | |
| 1980–81 | Castleton State | 2–19 | | | |
| 1981–82 | Castleton State | 14–13 | | | |
| Castleton State: | | 18–52 (.257) | | | |
Jacksonville Dolphins (Sun Belt Conference) (1991–1994)
| 1991–92 | Jacksonville | 12–17 | 6–10 | 9th | |
| 1992–93 | Jacksonville | 5–22 | 3–15 | 8th | |
| 1993–94 | Jacksonville | 17–11 | 11–7 | 4th | |
| Jacksonville University: | | 34–50 (.405) | 20–32 (.385) | | |
Western Kentucky Hilltoppers (Sun Belt Conference) (1994–1998)
| 1994–95 | Western Kentucky | 27–4 | 17–1 | 1st | NCAA Division I Second Round |
| 1995–96 | Western Kentucky | 13–14 | 10–8 | 4th | |
| 1996–97 | Western Kentucky | 12–15 | 9–9 | 6th | |
| 1997–98 | Western Kentucky | 7–16 | 4–10 | 9th | |
| Western Kentucky: | | 59–49 (.546) | 40–28 (.588) | | |
North Florida Ospreys (Peach Belt Conference) (1999–2005)
| 1999–00 | North Florida | 9–17 | 4–12 | 6th (South) | |
| 2000–01 | North Florida | 14–13 | 8–8 | T–2nd (South) | |
| 2001–02 | North Florida | 13–14 | 10–9 | T–4th (South) | |
| 2002–03 | North Florida | 15–14 | 11–8 | T–4th (South) | |
| 2003–04 | North Florida | 13–15 | 5–11 | 4th (South) | |
| 2004–05 | North Florida | 14–17 | 9–7 | 4th (South) | |
North Florida Ospreys (Atlantic Sun Conference) (2005–2009)
| 2005–06 | North Florida | 6–22 | 3–17 | 10th | |
| 2006–07 | North Florida | 3–26 | 1–17 | 10th | |
| 2007–08 | North Florida | 3–26 | 1–15 | 12th | |
| 2008–09 | North Florida | 8–22 | 6–14 | 10th | |
| North Florida: | | 98–186 (.345) | 58–128 (.312) | | |
| Total: | | 209–337 (.383) | | | |
National champion Postseason invitational champion Conference regular season champion Conference regular season and conference tournament champion Division regular season champion Division regular season and conference tournament champion Conference tournament champion
