= Matthew Driscoll (basketball) =

American college basketball coach (born 1964)

Current position
- Title: Assistant coach
- Team: NC State
- Conference: ACC

Biographical details
- Born: December 14, 1964 (age 61); Pittsburgh, Pennsylvania, U.S.
- Education: Slippery Rock University

Playing career
- 1986–1987: Butler County CC
- 1987–1988: Greensboro College

Coaching career (HC unless noted)
- 1988–1990: Northgate HS
- 1990–1991: Butler County CC (assistant)
- 1991–1992: Seneca Valley HS (assistant)
- 1992–1993: Slippery Rock (assistant)
- 1993–1997: LaRoche College
- 1997–1998: Wyoming (assistant)
- 1998–2003: Clemson (assistant)
- 2003: Valparaiso (assistant)
- 2003–2009: Baylor (assistant)
- 2009–2025: North Florida
- 2025–2026: Kansas State (AHC)
- 2026: Kansas State (interim HC)
- 2026–present: NC State (assistant)

Head coaching record
- Overall: 250–269 (.482) (college)
- Tournaments: 0–1 (NCAA Division I); 0–1 (NIT)

Accomplishments and honors

Championships
- 3 ASUN regular season (2015, 2016, 2020); ASUN tournament (2015)

Awards
- 3× ASUN Coach of the Year (2015, 2016, 2020)

Matthew Driscoll (December 14, 1964) is an American college basketball coach who is an assistant coach at North Carolina State University. Prior to his current tenure at NC State and previous tenure at Kansas State, Driscoll spent sixteen years as the head coach at the University of North Florida.

== Early life ==
A native of Pittsburgh, Pennsylvania, Driscoll is a 1992 graduate of Slippery Rock University.

== Coaching career ==
=== Early career (1993–2003) ===
From 1993 to 1997, he was the head coach at LaRoche College in Pittsburgh. His first stint as a Division I assistant was the 1997–98 season under Larry Shyatt for the Wyoming Cowboys, which resulted in a trip to the NIT. He then followed Shyatt as an assistant for the Clemson Tigers from 1998 to 2003. While at Clemson, Driscoll help lead the Tigers to the 1999 NIT finals and three wins over the North Carolina Tar Heels, including one when the Heels were ranked number 1 in the country.

=== Baylor (2003–2009) ===
In 2003, Driscoll spent seven weeks with Scott Drew at Valparaiso University before Drew accepted a job with the Baylor Bears, and Driscoll followed. At Baylor, Driscoll's primary responsibilities included on-court development, scouting, recruiting, and administrative duties. In his six years there, Driscoll helped revive the program from tragedy and NCAA sanctions. Baylor went from struggling under NCAA sanctions for his first several years, to making the NCAA tournament for the first time in twenty years in 2008. In 2009, Baylor lost in the Big 12 Tournament finals to Missouri, and won four games in the NIT before losing to Penn State at Madison Square Garden in the NIT finals. After one of the toughest rebuilding projects in college basketball history, Baylor finished with 21 wins in 2007–08 with wins over Notre Dame, South Carolina and Texas A&M, and 24 wins in 2008–09 with wins over defending national champion Kansas, Texas and Georgetown.

=== North Florida (2009–2024) ===
In 2009 Driscoll was hired as head coach of the North Florida Ospreys, succeeding Matt Kilcullen. He was the team's first coach since the University of North Florida completed its transition into NCAA Division I sports. In the 2010–11 he led the Ospreys to their first appearance in the ASUN Conference playoffs, in their second season of tournament eligibility. They upset Jacksonville University and East Tennessee State University to advance to the championship game, but were defeated 87–46 by Belmont University.

During the 2011–12 season, Driscoll coached the team to a school record 16 wins in a season, and first-ever season sweep of cross-town rival Jacksonville University.

In the 2014–15 season, Driscoll coached the team to a new school record of 23 wins. He also guided the school to the first ever ASUN regular season championship and was named Atlantic Sun Coach of the Year. The team then won the 2015 ASUN Conference tournament and earned their first ever bid to the NCAA tournament. After the season, he agreed to a 4-year contract extension to remain the team's head coach through 2022.

The Ospreys' success continued in the 2015–16 season, winning the Conference regular season championship again. Driscoll and his staff were named Atlantic Sun Coaching Staff of the Year for the second year in a row.

=== Kansas State (2025–2026) ===
In May 2025, Driscoll announced that he would be departing UNF in order to become the associate head coach at Kansas State University. Driscoll was elevated to interim head coach after Jerome Tang was fired by Kansas State.

== Personal life ==
Driscoll and his wife, Carrie, have two sons. He is a board member of the National Association of Basketball Coaches (NABC), and a former president.

== Head coaching record ==
=== College ===
Record table
| Season | Team | Overall | Conference | Standing | Postseason |
|---|---|---|---|---|---|
North Florida Ospreys (ASUN Conference) (2009–2025)
| 2009–10 | North Florida | 13–18 | 8–12 | 7th | |
| 2010–11 | North Florida | 15–19 | 10–10 | 6th | |
| 2011–12 | North Florida | 16–16 | 10–8 | T–4th | |
| 2012–13 | North Florida | 13–19 | 8–10 | 7th | |
| 2013–14 | North Florida | 16–16 | 10–8 | T–4th | |
| 2014–15 | North Florida | 23–12 | 12–2 | 1st | NCAA Division I First Four |
| 2015–16 | North Florida | 22–12 | 10–4 | 1st | NIT first round |
| 2016–17 | North Florida | 15–19 | 8–6 | 3rd | |
| 2017–18 | North Florida | 14–19 | 7–7 | T–4th | |
| 2018–19 | North Florida | 16–17 | 9–7 | T–3rd | |
| 2019–20 | North Florida | 21–12 | 13–3 | T–1st | Postseason Canceled |
| 2020–21 | North Florida | 8–15 | 6–6 | 4th | |
| 2021–22 | North Florida | 11–20 | 7–9 | T–4th (East) | |
| 2022–23 | North Florida | 14–17 | 9–9 | T–7th | |
| 2023–24 | North Florida | 16–16 | 9–7 | 5th | |
| 2024–25 | North Florida | 15–17 | 8–10 | T–7th | |
| North Florida: | | 248–264 (.484) | 143–118 (.548) | | |
Kansas State Wildcats (Big 12 Conference) (2026)
| 2025–26 | Kansas State | 2–5 | 2–4 | 15th | |
| Kansas State: | | 2–5 (.286) | 2–4 (.333) | | |
| Total: | | 250–269 (.482) | | | |
National champion Postseason invitational champion Conference regular season champion Conference regular season and conference tournament champion Division regular season champion Division regular season and conference tournament champion Conference tournament champion
