= North Florida Ospreys men's basketball =

College basketball team

2026–27 North Florida Ospreys men's basketball team
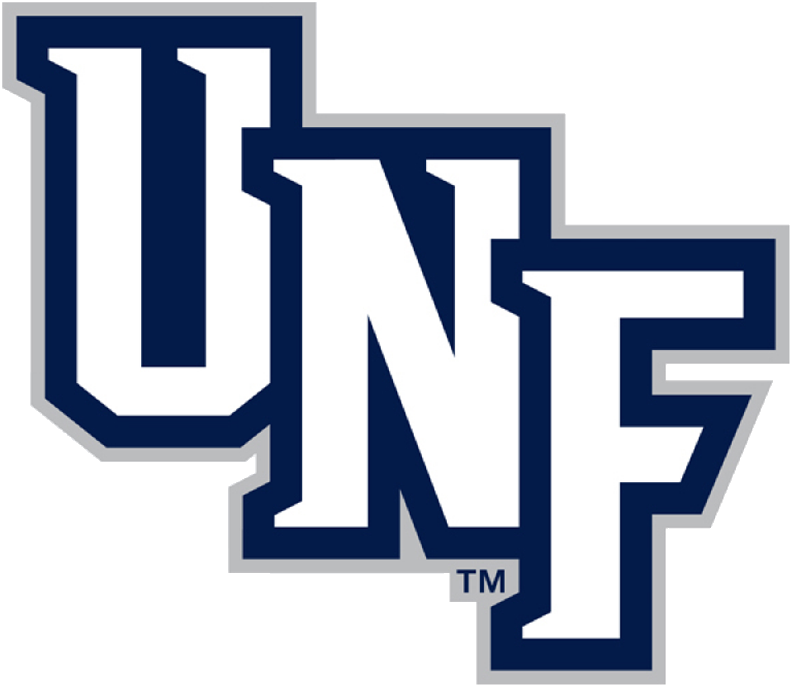
- University: University of North Florida
- Head coach: Bobby Kennen (2nd season)
- Location: Jacksonville, Florida
- Arena: UNF Arena (capacity: 5,800)
- Conference: Atlantic Sun Conference
- Nickname: Ospreys
- Colors: Navy blue and gray

NCAA Division I tournament appearances
- 2015

Conference tournament champions
- 2015

Conference regular-season champions
- 2015, 2016, 2020

Uniforms
Home	Away	Alternate

The North Florida Ospreys represent the University of North Florida (UNF) in men's college basketball. The Ospreys compete in the ASUN Conference (A-Sun) in Division I of the National Collegiate Athletic Association (NCAA). They play home games at UNF Arena on the school's campus in Jacksonville.

The program was founded in 1992 in the NAIA. They entered NCAA Division II the following season. The Ospreys transitioned into NCAA Division I from 2005 to 2009. In 2015, the Ospreys made their first appearance in the NCAA Tournament since transitioning to Division I. The Ospreys are currently led by interim head coach Bobby Kennen.

== History ==
The North Florida Ospreys men's basketball team played its first games in the 1992–93 season, spending their first year as a National Association of Intercollegiate Athletics (NAIA) Independent. UNF initially had no basketball court, so the Ospreys' first three home games were played at Florida Community College at Jacksonville until UNF Arena was finished in 1993. Their first coach was Rich Zvosec. In the 1993–94 season UNF transitioned into NCAA Division II, joining the Sunshine State Conference. In 1997–98 the Ospreys switched over to the Peach Belt Conference, also in Division II. After six seasons, Zvosec was succeeded as head coach by former National Basketball Association (NBA) player Sidney Green. In 1999, Matt Kilcullen became the team's third head coach.

In 2005, UNF began its transition into NCAA Division I competition, joining the Atlantic Sun Conference (A-Sun). The four-year transition period, 2005–2009, was difficult for the Ospreys, who compiled a record of 20–96, a substantially worse record than the Ospreys had faced in their previous six seasons under Coach Kilcullen. In 2009, new athletic director, Lee Moon, relieved Kilkullen of his position and replaced him with former Baylor University assistant coach Matthew Driscoll for the Ospreys' first year as full Division I members. The Ospreys improved under Driscoll, who led them to their first conference tournament appearance in the 2009–2010 season. In the 2011 A-Sun tournament the Ospreys upset Jacksonville and East Tennessee State to advance to the championship game, but were defeated 87–46 by Belmont. The game was UNF's first to be nationally televised.

In the 2014–15 season, the Ospreys made their first ever appearance in the NCAA Division I tournament by winning the Atlantic Sun tournament for the first time. On December 6, 2014, they defeated the Purdue Boilermakers on the road, marking their first ever victory over a Big Ten Conference opponent. They also won the Atlantic Sun regular season title for the first time and posted the best record in team history with 23 wins and 11 losses. As a No. 16 seed in the NCAA tournament, they were defeated by fellow No. 16 seed Robert Morris in the First Four in Dayton, Ohio. Nevertheless, the Ospreys drew unprecedented media attention both locally and nationally.

Their success continued as the 2015–16 Ospreys began the season with a 93–81 upset at Illinois. It was the program's second win over a Big Ten Conference opponent.

== Head coaches ==
Men's basketball head coaches	Seasons
Rich Zvosec	1991–1997
Sidney Green	1997–1999
Matt Kilcullen	1999–2009
Matthew Driscoll	2009–2025
Bobby Kennen	2025–present

== Facilities ==
The Ospreys' home venue is UNF Arena. Also the home to the UNF women's basketball and volleyball teams, it opened in 1993 and has a capacity of 5,800. The facility is slated to undergo upgrades and additions as part of UNF's Varsity Village program.

== Rivalries ==
North Florida's most notable rivalry is with crosstown opponents the Jacksonville University Dolphins. The two universities contest the "River City Rumble", in which the school with the most wins annually over the other across all sports receives a trophy, the SunTrust Old Wooden Barrel.

The first game between North Florida and Jacksonville was played on November 23, 2004 when JU defeated UNF, a Division II program, 78–73. The Ospreys' first win over their crosstown rival came on January 25, 2006 by a score of 90–78. The series record was 8–1 in favor of JU through the 2008–09 season, when UNF completed their transition to Division I.

After beginning their Division I era 0–5 against the Dolphins, UNF finally defeated JU in the 2011 A-Sun Tournament quarterfinals in one of the young program's most significant wins. Since then, the Ospreys have held the edge, bringing the all-time series record to 15–10 in favor of JU after the 2015–16 season. However, UNF leads the series 9–7 since UNF became a full Division I member.

== Year-by-year results ==
Record table
Season	Coach	Overall	Conference	Standing	Postseason
Independent (Note: North Florida joined the Sunshine State Conference as a provisional member during the 1992–93 school year.) (NAIA) (1992–1993)
1992–93	Rich Zvosec	7–20	–		
NAIA Total:		7–20			
Sunshine State Conference (Division II) (1993–1997)
1993–94	Rich Zvosec	15–13	5–9	T-6th	
1994–95	Rich Zvosec	10–17	2–12	8th	
1995–96	Rich Zvosec	14–15	6–9	6th	
1996–97	Rich Zvosec	8–19	2–12	7th	
Sunshine State Total:		47–64	15–42		
Peach Belt Conference (Division II) (1997–2005)
1997–98	Sidney Green	8–17	4–12	T-5th	
1998–99	Sidney Green	12–16	8–8	4th	
1999–00	Matt Kilcullen	9–17	4–12	6th	
2000–01	Matt Kilcullen	14–13	8–8	2nd	
2001–02	Matt Kilcullen	13–14	10–9	4th	
2002–03	Matt Kilcullen	15–14	11–8	4th	
2003–04	Matt Kilcullen	13–15	5–11	4th	
2004–05	Matt Kilcullen	14–17	9–7	4th	
Peach Belt Total:		98–123	59–75		
Atlantic Sun Conference (Division I) (2005–present)
2005–06	Matt Kilcullen	6–22	3–17	10th	
2006–07	Matt Kilcullen	3–26	1–17	10th	
2007–08	Matt Kilcullen	3–26	3–15	12th	
2008–09	Matt Kilcullen	8–22	6–14	11th	
2009–10	Matthew Driscoll	13–18	8–12	7th	
2010–11	Matthew Driscoll	15–19	10–10	6th	
2011–12	Matthew Driscoll	16–16	10–8	T-4th	
2012–13	Matthew Driscoll	13–19	8–10	T-7th	
2013–14	Matthew Driscoll	16–16	10–8	T-4th	
2014–15	Matthew Driscoll	23–12	12–2	1st	NCAA First Four
2015–16	Matthew Driscoll	22–12	10–4	1st	NIT first round
2016–17	Matthew Driscoll	15–19	8–6	3rd	
2017–18	Matthew Driscoll	14–19	7–7	T-4th	
2018–19	Matthew Driscoll	16–17	9–7	T–3rd	
2019–20	Matthew Driscoll	21–12	13–3	T–1st	Postseason Canceled
2020–21	Matthew Driscoll	8–15	6–6	4th	
2021–22	Matthew Driscoll	11–20	7–9	T–4th (East); T–6th (overall)	
2022–23	Matthew Driscoll	14–17	9–9	T–7th	
2023–24	Matthew Driscoll	16–16	9–7	5th	
2024–25	Matthew Driscoll	15–17	8–10	T–7th	
2025–26	Bobby Kennan	?–?	?–?	?	
Atlantic Sun Total:		268–360	142–168		
Total:		420–567			
National champion Postseason invitational champion Conference regular season champion Conference regular season and conference tournament champion Division regular season champion Division regular season and conference tournament champion Conference tournament champion

== Postseason ==
=== NCAA Division I tournament results ===
The Ospreys earned their first invitation to the NCAA Division I men's basketball tournament in 2015 as a #16 seed in the South Region. They lost to Robert Morris, giving them a tournament record of 0–1.

Year	Seed	Round	Opponent	Result
2015	#16	First Four	#16 Robert Morris	L 77–81

=== NIT results ===
The Ospreys earned their first bid to the National Invitation Tournament in 2016. Due to renovations at the O'Connell Center, the Ospreys hosted Florida at the UNF Arena.

Year	Seed	Round	Opponent	Result
2016	#7	First round	#2 Florida	L 68–97

=== Conference tournament results ===
In seven appearances in the Atlantic Sun men's basketball tournament, the Ospreys have an overall record of 9–8. They won their first Atlantic Sun Tournament championship in 2015.

Year	Seed	Round	Opponent	Result
2010	#7	Quarterfinals	#2 Jacksonville	L 69–76
2011	#6	Quarterfinals; Semifinals; Championship	#3 Jacksonville #2 East Tennessee State #1 Belmont	W 68–64; W 59–55; L 46–87
2012	#5	Quarterfinals	#4 East Tennessee State	L 66–68
2013	#7	Quarterfinals	#2 Florida Gulf Coast	L 63–73
2014	#6	Quarterfinals	#3 USC Upstate	L 74–80
2015	#1	Quarterfinals; Semifinals; Championship	#8 Stetson #5 Lipscomb #3 USC Upstate	W 81–67; W 71–57; W 63–57
2016	#1	Quarterfinals; Semifinals	#8 USC Upstate #4 Florida Gulf Coast	W 92–69; L 56–89
2017	#3	Quarterfinals; Semifinals; Championship	#6 Jacksonville #2 Lipscomb #1 Florida Gulf Coast	W 77–74; W 91-85; L 61–77
2018	#5	Quarterfinals; Semifinals	#4 NJIT #1 Florida Gulf Coast	W 80–76; L 72–95

=== Conference championships ===
The Ospreys won the Atlantic Sun regular season championship for the first time in the 2014–15 season and won their second in a row the following season.

Season	Coach	Overall record	Conference record
2014–15	Matthew Driscoll	23–12	12–2
2015–16	Matthew Driscoll	22–11	10–4
