= Archer (surname) =

- Pronunciation: /ˈɑːrtʃər/ AR-chər
- Language: Middle English

Origin
- Meaning: Occupational name denoting an archer
- Region of origin: England, Welsh

Other names
- Variant forms: Bowman, Archier, Fletcher

Archer is a surname in the English language.

== Etymology ==
The name Archer is derived from the Middle English archere, and Old French archer, archier. The surname originated as an occupational name denoting an archer. By the 14th century, the mentioned Middle English and Old French words replaced the native English bowman. In North America, the surname Archer has absorbed many like-sounding names and cognates (for example, the French Archier).

== People with the surname ==
=== Academics and scientists ===
- Allan Frost Archer (1908–1994), American arachnologist, entomologist and malacologist
- David Archer (scientist), American computational ocean chemist
- Edward Archer (physician) (1718–1789), English doctor associated with inoculation against smallpox
- Frederick Scott Archer (1813–1857), British pioneer of photography
- Gleason Archer Sr. (1880–1966), founder of Suffolk University, Boston, Massachusetts
- John Hall Archer (1914–2004), Canadian historian, and first President of the University of Regina
- John Stuart Archer (1943–2007), Vice-Chancellor of Heriot-Watt University 1997–2006
- Kellie Archer (born 1969), American biostatistician
- L. Bruce Archer (1922–2005), British mechanical engineer and Professor of Design Research
- Leonie Archer (born 1955), British author and historian
- Louise Archer (1893–1948), American teacher and activist
- Margaret Archer (1943–2023), British sociologist
- Mary Archer (born 1944), British solar power scientist
- Mike Archer (paleontologist) (born 1945), Australian palaeontologist
- Mildred Archer (1911–2005), English art historian
- Rosalind Archer, New Zealand engineering professor
- Thomas Andrew Archer (1853–1905), English historian
- William Archer (architect) (1820–1874), botanist and architect
- William Archer (naturalist) (1830–1897), Irish naturalist and microscopist

=== Actors ===
- Alfie Archer (born 2009), British actress
- Anne Archer (born 1947), American actress
- Beverly Archer (born 1948), American actress
- John Archer (actor) (1915–1999), American movie and television actor
- Melissa Archer (born 1979), American actress
- Scarlett Archer (born 1989 or 1990), British actress

=== Architects ===
- Colin Archer (1832–1921), Scottish-born Norwegian naval architect
- John Lee Archer (1791–1852), Australian architect and engineer
- Thomas Archer (1668–1743), English Baroque architect
- William Archer (architect) (1820–1874), Australian architect, naturalist, grazier and politician

=== Artists ===
- Dave Archer (painter) (born 1941), American reverse glass painter and sculptor
- Ernest Archer (art director) (1910–1990), British art director
- Hazel Larsen Archer (1921–2001), American photographer
- James Archer (artist) (1823–1904), Scottish painter
- Janet Archer (fl. 1873–1916), British painter
- Michael Dan Archer (born 1955), Scottish sculptor
- Val Archer (born 1946), British painter

=== Businesspeople ===
- Bill Archer (businessman), British businessman and founder of Focus DIY
- Henry Archer (1799–1863), Irish businessman, lawyer, railway pioneer and inventor
- James Archer (stock trader) (born 1974), English businessman and stockbroker
- Renato Archer (born 1984), Suriname entrepreneur

=== Judges ===
- Glenn L. Archer Jr. (1929–2011), American judge
- Lawrence Archer (1820–1910), American judge, politician, lawyer, Mayor of San Jose, California
- Philip Edward Archer (1925–2002), former Chief Justice of Ghana

=== Musicians, singers, and composers ===
- Christopher Archer (born 1988), Australian vocalist of the band Backyard Mortuary
- Edward Archer, hip-hop performer Special Ed
- Frederic Archer (1838–1901), British composer, conductor and organist
- Gem Archer (born 1966), English musician
- Iain Archer, Northern Irish singer-songwriter musician
- Kevin "Al" Archer (born 1958), English guitarist and songwriter
- Laurence Archer, English guitarist
- Malcolm Archer (born 1952), British composer, organist, and conductor
- Michael Eugene Archer, American singer-songwriter known as D'Angelo
- Richard Archer (born 1977), English singer/songwriter, frontman of UK band Hard-Fi
- Robyn Archer (born 1948), Australian singer and actress
- Steve Archer (born 1953), American singer-songwriter and producer
- Tasmin Archer (born 1963), English soul/pop/rock singer
- Tony Archer (musician) (1939–2025), English jazz double-bassist
- Violet Archer (1913–2000), Canadian composer

=== Politicians ===
- Albert Ernest Archer (1878–1949), Canadian physician and political activist
- Andrew Archer (1659–1741), British landowner and Member of Parliament
- Archibald Archer (1820–1902), member of the Legislative Assembly of Queensland
- Brian Archer (1929–2013), Australian Liberal Party senator
- Caroline Archer (1922–1978), Australian Aboriginal activist
- Charles Archer (1861–1941), British Chief Commissioner of Baluchistan
- Dennis Archer (born 1942), American lawyer and politician
- Edward Archer (politician) (1871–1940), Australian politician
- Elise Archer (born 1971), Australian lawyer and politician
- Fred W. Archer (1859–1936), Canadian politician
- Geoffrey Archer (colonial administrator) (1882–1964), British colonial administrator
- Harry W. Archer Jr. (1854–1910), American politician and lawyer
- Henry W. Archer (1813–1887), American politician and lawyer
- James T. Archer (1819–1859), American lawyer and politician
- John Archer (Maryland politician) (1741–1810), American congressman
- John Archer (New Zealand politician) (1865–1949), New Zealand politician
- John Archer (British politician) (1863–1932), British race and political activist
- Marshall Archer, American politician
- Peter Archer, Baron Archer of Sandwell (1926–2012), British peer
- Renato Archer (1922–1996), Brazilian naval officer and politician
- Shelley Archer (born 1958), Australian Labor Party politician
- Simon Archer (antiquary) (1581–1662), English antiquary and politician
- Stevenson Archer (politician, born 1786), American congressman
- Stevenson Archer (1827–98) (1827–1898), American congressman, son of the above
- Thomas Archer (died 1685) (1619–1685), English soldier and politician
- Thomas Archer, 1st Baron Archer (1695–1768), English politician and nobleman
- Thomas Archer (pastoralist) (1823–1905), pioneer pastoralist and Agent General for Queensland, Australia
- William Archer (Toronto politician) (1919–2005), Canadian politician and lawyer
- William Reynolds Archer Jr. (born 1928), American politician and lawyer
- William S. Archer (1789–1855), Virginian politician

=== Religious figures ===
- Gleason Archer Jr. (1916–2004), American theologian
- Glenn L. Archer (1906–2002), founder of the Americans United for Separation of Church and State
- James Archer (Jesuit) (1550–1620), Irish Jesuit
- Raymond LeRoy Archer (1887–1970), American bishop of the Methodist Church

=== Sportspeople ===
- Alex Archer (ice hockey) (1908–1979), English ice hockey player
- Alfred Archer (1871–1935), English cricketer
- Arthur Archer (footballer) (1874–1940), English footballer
- Barry Archer (born 1977), Irish cricketer
- Bob Archer (1899–1982), English footballer
- Brandon Archer (born 1983), American football linebacker
- Brenda Archer (born 1942), retired Guyanese high jumper
- Carl Archer (born 1948), Trinidad and Tobagonian athlete
- Chris Archer (born 1988), American baseball player
- Dan Archer (born 1944), American football player
- David Archer (quarterback) (born 1962), American football player
- David Archer (umpire) (1931–1992), West Indian cricketer and umpire
- Dennis Archer (cricketer) (born 1963), Bermudan cricketer
- Dri Archer, football player
- Fred V. Archer (1888–1971), American college football coach
- Frederick J. Archer (1857–1886), English flat race jockey
- Garath Archer (born 1974), English rugby union footballer
- Glenn Archer (born 1973), Australian rules footballer
- George Archer several people
- Graeme Archer (cricketer) (born 1940), English cricketer
- Graeme Archer (bowls) (born 1967), Scottish lawn bowler
- Jack Archer (sprinter) (1921–1997), English sprinter
- Jayo Archer (1996–2024), Australian motocross rider
- Jim Archer (1932–2019), American baseball pitcher
- Jimmy Archer (1883–1958), Irish-born American baseball catcher
- Joey Archer (1938–2025), American middleweight boxer
- Jofra Archer (born 1995), Barbadian born English cricketer
- John Archer (basketball) (died 1998), American basketball coach
- John Archer (footballer, born 1941), English footballer
- Johnny Archer (born 1968), American professional pool player
- Ken Archer (1928–2023), Australian cricketer
- Lance Archer (born 1977), ring name of professional wrestler Lance Hoyt
- Lee Archer (footballer) (born 1972), English footballer
- Les Archer Jr. (1929–2019), English motorcycle racer
- Meghan Archer (born 1987), Australian footballer
- Mike Archer (American football) (born 1953), American football coach
- Nicolas Archer (born 1955), English cricketer
- Phillip Archer (born 1972), English professional golfer
- Ralph Archer, American college football coach
- Ron Archer (1933–2007), Australian cricketer
- Simon Archer (badminton) (born 1973), English badminton player
- Tommy Archer (born 1954), American racing car driver
- Tony Archer (referee) (born 1969), Australian rugby league referee
- Troy Archer (1955–1979), American footballer

=== Television and film production ===
- Cam Archer (born 1981), American independent filmmaker and photographer
- Dale Archer, American medical doctor and television personality
- Mark Archer (born 1973), American film producer, director and writer
- Wes Archer (born 1961), American television animation director

=== Writers ===
- Bert Archer (born 1968), Canadian author, journalist, essayist and critic
- Catherine Archer (fl. 1992–2003), Canadian writer of historical romance novels
- Fred Archer (writer) (1915–1999), English farmer and author
- Geoffrey Archer (writer), British author of military thrillers
- Jeffrey Archer (1940–2026), British author, former politician
- Jennifer Archer (born 1957), American author
- Jules Archer (1915–2008), American author
- Nuala Archer (born 1955), Irish-American poet
- Ruby Archer (1873–1961), American poet
- William Archer (critic) (1856–1924), Scottish critic

=== Others ===
- John Archer (magician), British comedy magician

== Fictional characters ==
- Major Brendan Archer, main character in the J.G. Farrell novels Troubles and The Singapore Grip.
- Cate Archer, main character in No One Lives Forever, a computer game
- Danny Archer, main character in the film Blood Diamond
- Frank Archer, a soldier in the Fullmetal Alchemist anime
- Isabel Archer, main character in the Henry James novel The Portrait of a Lady
- Jonathan Archer, main character of the television show Star Trek: Enterprise
- Lew Archer, a private detective in a series of novels by Ross MacDonald
- Miles Archer, in the Dashiell Hammett novel The Maltese Falcon
- Nancy Archer, title character of the film Attack of the 50 Foot Woman
- Newland Archer, in the Edith Wharton novel The Age of Innocence
- Obadiah Archer, a main character in the Valiant Comics comic book series Archer & Armstrong
- Sean Archer, portrayed by John Travolta/Nicolas Cage in the movie Face/Off
- Sterling Archer, main character in the animated television series Archer
- Several related characters in the Philip K. Dick novel The Transmigration of Timothy Archer

== See also ==
- Justice Archer (disambiguation)
- Archer (given name)
