= John Archer =

John Archer may refer to:

== Law ==
- John L'Archers (died 1349), English cleric and judge in Ireland
- Sir John Archer (judge) (1598–1682), English judge

== Politics ==
- John Archer (American politician) (1741–1810), U.S. congressman from Maryland
- John Archer (British politician) (1863–1932), British politician, one of the first persons of African descent elected to public office
- John Archer (New Zealand politician) (1865–1949), New Zealand politician
- John W. Archer (politician), American politician, member of the Maryland House of Delegates, 1910–1911

== Academia ==
- John Hall Archer (1914–2004), Canadian archivist and historian, president of the University of Regina
- John Stuart Archer (1943–2007), British petroleum engineer, vice-chancellor of Heriot-Watt University, 1997–2006

== Entertainment ==
- John Archer (actor) (1915–1999), American film and television actor
- John Archer (magician), British comedy magician

== Sport ==
- John Archer (basketball) (died 1998), head basketball coach of the Troy State Trojans, 1956–1973
- John Archer (footballer, born 1936) (1936–1987), English football goalkeeper
- John Archer (footballer, born 1941) (1941–2021), English football striker
- Johnny Archer (born 1968), American pool player

== Others ==
- Henry Archer (Fifth Monarchist) (died c. 1642), also known as John Archer, English Puritan
- John Archer (physician), English court physician in the reign of Charles II
- John Lee Archer (1791–1852), British-born architect and engineer in Van Diemen's Land
- John Wykeham Archer (1808–1864), British artist, engraver and writer
- John Archer (colonial administrator) (1893–1948), British colonial administrator
- Sir John Archer (British Army officer) (1924–1999), British Army general

== Fictional characters ==
- John Archer, a character in British radio drama The Archers, killed in a tractor accident in 1998

== See also ==
- John Archer-Houblon (1773–1831), MP for Essex
- Jack Archer (disambiguation)
- Jonathan Archer, captain of the Enterprise (NX-01) in Star Trek: Enterprise
- Archer (surname)
