= Troy Trojans men's basketball statistical leaders =

The Troy Trojans men's basketball statistical leaders are individual statistical leaders of the Troy Trojans men's basketball program in various categories, including points, assists, blocks, rebounds, and steals. Within those areas, the lists identify single-game, single-season, and career leaders. The Trojans represent Troy University in the NCAA's Sun Belt Conference.

Troy began competing in intercollegiate basketball in 1950. The NCAA did not officially record assists as a stat until the 1983–84 season, and blocks and steals until the 1985–86 season, but Troy's record books includes players in these stats before these seasons. These lists are updated through the end of the 2022–23 season.

== Scoring ==
Career
Rk	Player	Points	Seasons
1	Wesley Person Jr.	2063	2014–15 2015–16 2016–17 2017–18
2	Jordon Varnado	1917	2015–16 2016–17 2017–18 2018–19
3	Anthony Reed	1865	1986–87 1987–88 1988–89 1989–90
4	Mac Madison	1761	1980–81 1981–82 1982–83 1983–84
5	Carl Hollis	1747	1973–74 1974–75 1975–76 1976–77
6	Marvin Sales	1704	1974–75 1975–76 1976–77 1977–78
7	Robert Rushing	1533	1998–99 1999–00 2000–01 2001–02
8	David Felix	1469	1973–74 1974–75 1975–76 1976–77
9	Darryl Thomas	1415	1987–88 1988–89
10	Rhodney Donaldson	1363	1993–94 1994–95 1995–96 1996–97

Season
Rk	Player	Points	Season
1	Darryl Thomas	815	1987–88

Single game
Rk	Player	Points	Season	Opponent
1	Calvin Aultman	47	1990–91	Jacksonville State
2	Detric Golden	45	1999–00	Jacksonville
	Terry McCord	45	1992–93	Alabama State
	Terry McCord	45	1991–92	Valdosta State
5	Justin Jonus	44	2007–08	Paul Quinn
6	Ralph Nash	43	1958–59	St. Bernard
	Lamayn Wilson	43	2001–02	Florida Atlantic
8	O'Darien Bassett	42	2007–08	Florida Atlantic
	John Duce	42	1963–64	Georgia Southern
	Marvin Madison	42	1982–83	Jacksonville State

== Rebounds ==
Career
Rk	Player	Rebounds	Seasons
1	Marvin Sales	1318	1974–75 1975–76 1976–77 1977–78
2	Carl Hollis	1124	1973–74 1974–75 1975–76 1976–77
3	Anthony Reed	913	1986–87 1987–88 1988–89 1989–90
4	Learnest Martin	851	1970–71 1971–72
5	Jordon Varnado	818	2015–16 2016–17 2017–18 2018–19
6	Zay Williams	817	2018–19 2019–20 2020–21 2021–22 2022–23
7	Thomas Dowd	747	2023–24 2024–25 2025–26
8	Mac Madison	727	1980–81 1981–82 1982–83 1983–84
9	Rob Lewin	694	2000–01 2001–02 2002–03 2003–04
10	Alex Hicks	676	2016–17 2017–18 2018–19

Season
Rk	Player	Rebounds	Season
1	Learnest Martin	471	1971–72

Single game
Rk	Player	Rebounds	Season	Opponent
1	Learnest Martin	41	1971–72	Ga. Southwestern
2	Learnest Martin	30	1971–72	Jacksonville State
3	Learnest Martin	27	1971–72	West Alabama
4	Billy Cannon	26	1969–70	Lake Forest
	Billy Cannon	26	1969–70	Evangel College
	Doug Carmichael	26	1966–67	North Alabama
	Dave Watson	26	1971–72	Athens State
8	Cleveland Hollis	25	1971–72	Athens State 1/15/72
	Learnest Martin	25	1971–72	Jacksonville State
10	Cleveland Hollis	24	1970–71	Huntingdon
	Cleveland Hollis	24	1970–71	Athens State

== Assists ==
Career
Rk	Player	Assists	Seasons
1	David Felix	625	1973–74 1974–75 1975–76 1976–77
2	Michael Vogler	473	2007–08 2008–09 2009–10
3	Charles McDonald	462	1989–90 1990–91
4	Greg Davis	408	2002–03 2003–04
5	Herbert Evans	338	2000–01 2001–02 2002–03 2003–04
6	Steve Hunt	333	1991–92 1992–93 1993–94
7	Will Weathers	326	2010–11 2011–12
8	Marlon McGaughy	322	1984–85 1985–86
9	Rod Knight	315	1984–85 1985–86 1986–87 1987–88
10	Bobby Dixon	314	2004–05 2005–06

Season
Rk	Player	Assists	Season
1	Greg Davis	256	2003–04

Single game
Rk	Player	Assists	Season	Opponent
1	Michael Vogler	17	2008–09	Northwestern State

== Steals ==
Career
Rk	Player	Steals	Seasons
1	Robert Rushing	203	1998–99 1999–00 2000–01 2001–02
2	Michael Vogler	173	2007–08 2008–09 2009–10
3	Andy Davis	167	1988–89 1989–90 1990–91 1991–92
4	Tayton Conerway	164	2023–24 2024–25
5	Bobby Dixon	159	2004–05 2005–06
	Herbert Evans	159	2000–01 2001–02 2002–03 2003–04
7	Calvin Aultman	155	1989–90 1990–91
8	Anthony Reed	149	1986–87 1987–88 1988–89 1989–90
9	Rod Knight	139	1984–85 1985–86 1986–87 1987–88
10	Jack Smith	137	1990–91 1991–92
	Jeff Black	137	1993–94 1994–95 1995–96 1996–97

Season
Rk	Player	Steals	Season
1	Tayton Conerway	98	2024–25
2	Bobby Dixon	88	2005–06

Single game
Rk	Player	Steals	Season	Opponent
1	Tom Jervis	9	2007–08	Ole Miss

== Blocks ==
Career
Rk	Player	Blocks	Seasons
1	Rob Lewin	151	2000–01 2001–02 2002–03 2003–04
2	Jordon Varnado	147	2015–16 2016–17 2017–18 2018–19
3	Juan Washington	123	1985–86 1986–87 1987–88
4	Sammy Sharp	107	2005–06 2006–07
5	Zay Williams	106	2018–19 2019–20 2020–21 2021–22 2022–23
6	Tom Jervis	105	2007–08 2008–09
7	Jeff Black	97	1993–94 1994–95 1995–96 1996–97
8	Bernard Toombs	86	2006–07 2007–08 2009–10 2010–11
9	Lovell Craig	81	1999–00 2000–01 2001–02 2002–03
10	Jarvis Acker	72	2003–04 2004–05 2005–06 2007–08

Season
Rk	Player	Blocks	Season
1	Juan Washington	78	1987–88

Single game
Rk	Player	Blocks	Season	Opponent
1	Rodney Jackson	9	1994–95	Eastern Illinois
