= 2001–02 Troy State Trojans men's basketball team =

American college basketball season

2001–02 Troy State Trojans men's basketball

ASUN regular season co-champions
- Conference: Atlantic Sun Conference
- Record: 18–10 (14–6 ASUN)
- Head coach: Don Maestri (9th season)
- Home arena: Trojan Arena

2001–02 Atlantic Sun men's basketball standings
	Conf.				Overall
Team	W		L	PCT	W		L	PCT
Georgia State	14	–	6	.700	20	–	11	.645
Troy State	14	–	6	.700	18	–	10	.643
Florida Atlantic †	13	–	7	.650	19	–	12	.613
Jacksonville	12	–	8	.600	18	–	12	.600
UCF	12	–	8	.600	17	–	12	.586
Samford	12	–	8	.600	15	–	14	.517
Jacksonville State	8	–	12	.400	13	–	16	.448
Belmont	8	–	12	.400	11	–	17	.393
Stetson	7	–	13	.350	10	–	16	.385
Campbell	6	–	14	.300	8	–	19	.296
Mercer	4	–	16	.200	6	–	23	.207
† 2002 Atlantic Sun Tournament winner As of March 4, 2003; Rankings from AP Poll

The 2001–02 Troy State Trojans men's basketball team represented Troy State University during the 2001–02 NCAA Division I men's basketball season. The Trojans, led by head coach Don Maestri – coaching in his 9th season, played their home games at Trojan Arena and were members of the Atlantic Sun Conference. They finished the season 18–10, 14–6 in ASUN play to finish tied atop in the regular season conference standings. The Trojans would lose in the quarterfinals of the Atlantic Sun tournament to Jacksonville State.

== Roster ==
2001–02 Troy Trojans men's basketball team
Players
Coaches

Pos.	#	Name	Height	Weight	Year	Hometown
F	1	Lamayn Wilson	6 ft 8 in (2.03 m)	210 lb (95 kg)	Sr	Highland Home, Alabama
G	3	Robert Rushing	6 ft 1 in (1.85 m)	170 lb (77 kg)	Sr	Fort Gaines, Georgia
G	5	Herbert Evans	6 ft 3 in (1.91 m)	195 lb (88 kg)	So	Memphis, Tennessee
G	15	Ben Fletcher	6 ft 3 in (1.91 m)	185 lb (84 kg)	Jr	Selma, Alabama
F	21	Donnie Pemberton	6 ft 6 in (1.98 m)	205 lb (93 kg)	Sr	Bainbridge, Georgia
G	24	Jacob Hazouri	6 ft 3 in (1.91 m)	185 lb (84 kg)	Fr	Pace, Florida
F	25	Marcus Milhouse	6 ft 4 in (1.93 m)	170 lb (77 kg)	Jr	Selma, Alabama
C	31	Rob Lewin	6 ft 7 in (2.01 m)	230 lb (104 kg)	So	Staten Island, New York
F	32	Lacedrick Pettway	6 ft 6 in (1.98 m)	210 lb (95 kg)	Jr	Mobile, Alabama
C	35	Lovell Craig	6 ft 9 in (2.06 m)	210 lb (95 kg)	Jr	Selma, Alabama

Head coach

- Don Maestri (Southern Miss)

Assistant coach(es)

Legend

- (C) Team captain
- (S) Suspended
- (I) Ineligible
- (W) Walk-on
- Injured
- Current redshirt

Roster

== Schedule and results ==
Date time, TV	Rank^{#}	Opponent^{#}	Result	Record	Site (attendance) city, state
Regular season
Nov 16, 2001*		at Kansas State	L 60–64	0–1	Bramlage Coliseum; Manhattan, Kansas
Nov 23, 2001*		at Marshall	W 77–72	1–1	Cam Henderson Center; Huntington, West Virginia
Nov 25, 2001*		at Maine	W 73–71 ^{OT}	2–1	Alfond Arena; Orono, Maine
Nov 29, 2001		Jacksonville State	W 70–52	3–1 (1–0)	Trojan Arena; Troy, Alabama
Dec 1, 2001		Samford	L 65–68	3–2 (1–1)	Trojan Arena; Troy, Alabama
Dec 8, 2001*		at Utah	L 56–87	3–3	Jon M. Huntsman Center; Salt Lake City, Utah
Dec 15, 2001*		Nicholls State	W 98–86	4–3	Trojan Arena; Troy, Alabama
Dec 19, 2001		at Campbell	W 88–81	5–3 (2–1)	Carter Gymnasium; Buies Creek, North Carolina
Dec 29, 2001*		vs. San Diego; Bobcat Classic	L 63–70	5–4	Worthington Arena; Bozeman, Montana
Dec 30, 2001*		vs. Hampton; Bobcat Classic	W 100–91 ^{OT}	6–4	Worthington Arena; Bozeman, Montana
Jan 2, 2002		at Georgia State	L 67–84	6–5 (2–2)	GSU Sports Arena; Atlanta, Georgia
Jan 5, 2002		at Belmont	W 80–75	7–5 (3–2)	Nashville Municipal Auditorium; Nashville, Tennessee
Jan 10, 2002		UCF	W 85–74	8–5 (4–2)	Trojan Arena; Troy, Alabama
Jan 12, 2002; 7:00 p.m.		Florida Atlantic	W 107–100 ^{2OT}	9–5 (5–2)	Trojan Arena (1,992); Troy, Alabama
Jan 17, 2002		at Stetson	W 94–68	10–5 (6–2)	Edmunds Center; DeLand, Florida
Jan 19, 2002		at Jacksonville	L 71–74	10–6 (6–3)	Swisher Gymnasium; Jacksonville, Florida
Jan 23, 2002		Mercer	W 71–65	11–6 (7–3)	Trojan Arena; Troy, Alabama
Jan 26, 2002		Stetson	W 68–65	12–6 (8–3)	Trojan Arena; Troy, Alabama
Jan 28, 2002		Jacksonville	W 76–61	13–6 (9–3)	Trojan Arena; Troy, Alabama
Feb 2, 2002; 6:00 p.m.		at Florida Atlantic	L 66–67	13–7 (9–4)	FAU Arena (1,943); Boca Raton, Florida
Feb 4, 2002		at UCF	W 64–58	14–7 (10–4)	UCF Arena; Orlando, Florida
Feb 9, 2002		Belmont	W 65–64	15–7 (11–4)	Trojan Arena; Troy, Alabama
Feb 11, 2002		at Mercer	L 71–72	15–8 (11–5)	Porter Gym; Macon, Georgia
Feb 14, 2002		Campbell	W 81–71	16–8 (12–5)	Trojan Arena; Troy, Alabama
Feb 16, 2002		Georgia State	L 88–102	16–9 (12–6)	Trojan Arena; Troy, Alabama
Feb 21, 2002		at Samford	W 64–52	17–9 (13–6)	Seibert Hall; Homewood, Alabama
Feb 23, 2002		at Jacksonville State	W 79–60	18–9 (14–6)	Pete Mathews Coliseum; Jacksonville, Alabama
Atlantic Sun tournament
Feb 28, 2002*	(2)	vs. (7) Jacksonville State; Quarterfinals	L 62–69	18–10	UCF Arena; Orlando, Florida
*Non-conference game. ^{#}Rankings from AP poll. (#) Tournament seedings in parentheses. All times are in Central Time.
