= List of Florida Atlantic Owls men's basketball seasons =

Collegiate sports page

This is a list of seasons completed by the Florida Atlantic Owls men's college basketball team.

== Seasons ==
Statistics overview
Season	Coach	Overall	Conference	Standing	Postseason
Lonnie Williams (Division II Independent) (1988–1989)
1988–89	Lonnie Williams	9–19	—	—	—
Lonnie Williams:		9–19 (.321)	—		
Tim Loomis (Division II Independent) (1989–1993)
1989–90	Tim Loomis	21–7	—	—	—
1990–91	Tim Loomis	17–10	—	—	—
1991–92	Tim Loomis	15–13	—	—	—
Tim Loomis (Atlantic Sun Conference) (1993–1995)
1992–93	Tim Loomis	3–25	—	—	—
1993–94	Tim Loomis	3–24	—	—	—
1994–95	Tim Loomis	9–18	—	—	—
Tim Loomis:		68–97 (.412)	—		
Kevin Billerman (Atlantic Sun Conference) (1995–1999)
1995–96	Kevin Billerman	9–18	5–11	6th East	—
1996–97	Kevin Billerman	16–11	11–5	3rd East	—
1997–98	Kevin Billerman	5–22	5–11	5th East	—
1998–99	Kevin Billerman	6–20	3–13	11th	—
Kevin Billerman:		36–71 (.336)	24–39 (.381)		
Sidney Green (Atlantic Sun Conference) (1999–2005)
1999–2000	Sidney Green	2–28	0–18	10th	—
2000–01	Sidney Green	7–24	5–13	9th	—
2001–02	Sidney Green	19–12	13–7	3rd	NCAA Division I first round
2002–03	Sidney Green	7–21	3–13	6th South	—
2003–04	Sidney Green	9–19	6–14	8th	—
2004–05	Sidney Green	10–17	10–10	9th	—
Sidney Green:		54–121 (.309)	37–112 (.330)		
Matt Doherty (Atlantic Sun Conference) (2005–2006)
2005–06	Matt Doherty	15–13	14–6	3rd	—
Matt Doherty:		15–13 (.536)	14–6 (.700)		
Rex Walters (Sun Belt Conference) (2006–2008)
2006–07	Rex Walters	16–15	10–8	3rd East	—
2007–08	Rex Walters	15–18	8–10	3rd East	—
Rex Walters:		31–33 (.484)	18–18 (.500)		
Mike Jarvis (Sun Belt Conference) (2008–2013)
2008–09	Mike Jarvis	6–26	2–16	6th East	—
2009–10	Mike Jarvis	14–16	10–8	4th East	—
2010–11	Mike Jarvis	21–11	13–3	1st	NIT first round
2011-12	Mike Jarvis	11–19	7–9	8th	—
2012–13	Mike Jarvis	14–18	9–11	7th	—
Mike Jarvis (Conference USA) (2013–2014)
2013–14	Mike Jarvis	10–22	5–11	11th	—
Mike Jarvis:		76–112 (.404)	46–58 (.442)		
Michael Curry (Conference USA) (2014–2018)
2014–15	Michael Curry	9–20	2–16	14th	—
2015–16	Michael Curry	8–25	5–13	12th	—
2016–17	Michael Curry	10–20	6–12	11th	—
2017–18	Michael Curry	12–19	6–12	11th	—
Michael Curry:		39–84 (.317)	19–53 (.264)		
Dusty May (Conference USA) (2018–2023)
2018–19	Dusty May	17–16	8–10	9th	—
2019–20	Dusty May	17–15	8–10	9th	No postseason held
2020–21	Dusty May	13–10	7–5	4th East	—
2021–22	Dusty May	19–15	11–7	3rd East	—
2022–23	Dusty May	35–4	18–2	1st	NCAA Division I Final Four
Dusty May (American Athletic Conference) (2023–2024)
2023–24	Dusty May	25–9	14–4	2nd	NCAA Division I first round
Dusty May:		118–66 (.641)	59–35 (.628)		
John Jakus (American Athletic Conference) (2024–pres.)
2024–25	John Jakus	18–15	10–8	5th	NIT first round
2025–26	John Jakus	18–15	9–9	T–5th	
John Jakus:		36–30 (.545)	19–17 (.528)		
Total:		457–627 (.422)			
National champion Postseason invitational champion Conference regular season champion Conference regular season and conference tournament champion Division regular season champion Division regular season and conference tournament champion Conference tournament champion
