= Dr. D =

Dr. D. may refer to:

- Dr Disrespect (born 1982), an American video game streamer
- Dorothy Lavinia Brown (1914–2004), American surgeon, teacher and politician
- Dale Archer (born 1956), American physician and television personality
- Dr. Demento (born 1941), American disc jockey
- Dr. Dre (born 1965), the rapper/producer
- Doctor Dré (born 1963), American radio personality and MTV VJ
- Dr. Doofenshmirtz, a character from the American animated television series Phineas and Ferb and Milo Murphy's Law
- "Dr. D" David Schultz (born 1955), American professional wrestler
- "Dr. D.", a song by The Mighty Mighty Bosstones from More Noise and Other Disturbances
- Dr Dee, an opera created by Rufus Norris and Damon Albarn
- Christopher Duntsch (born 1971), American former neurosurgeon convicted of maiming his patients, nicknamed "Dr. D"
