= 2001–02 Florida Atlantic Owls men's basketball team =

American college basketball season

2001–02 Florida Atlantic Owls men's basketball

ASUN tournament champions

NCAA tournament, first round
- Conference: Atlantic Sun Conference
- Record: 19–12 (13–7 ASUN)
- Head coach: Sidney Green (3rd season)
- Home arena: FAU Arena

2001–02 Atlantic Sun men's basketball standings
	Conf.				Overall
Team	W		L	PCT	W		L	PCT
Georgia State	14	–	6	.700	20	–	11	.645
Troy State	14	–	6	.700	18	–	10	.643
Florida Atlantic †	13	–	7	.650	19	–	12	.613
Jacksonville	12	–	8	.600	18	–	12	.600
UCF	12	–	8	.600	17	–	12	.586
Samford	12	–	8	.600	15	–	14	.517
Jacksonville State	8	–	12	.400	13	–	16	.448
Belmont	8	–	12	.400	11	–	17	.393
Stetson	7	–	13	.350	10	–	16	.385
Campbell	6	–	14	.300	8	–	19	.296
Mercer	4	–	16	.200	6	–	23	.207
† 2002 Atlantic Sun Tournament winner As of March 4, 2003; Rankings from AP Poll

The 2001–02 Florida Atlantic Owls men's basketball team represented Florida Atlantic University during the 2001–02 NCAA Division I men's basketball season. The Owls were led by third year head coach Sidney Green and played their home games at FAU Arena in Boca Raton, Florida as members of the Atlantic Sun Conference.

The Owls finished the season 19–12, 13–7 in ASUN play to finish third in the regular season standings. They defeated Jacksonville, Jacksonville State, and Georgia State to win the ASUN tournament championship. As a result, they received the conference's automatic bid to the NCAA tournament – the first appearance in school history – as the No. 15 seed in the South region. They were defeated by No. 2 seed Alabama in the first round.

The Owls would not return to the NCAA tournament until the 2022–23 season where they advanced to the Final Four.

== Roster ==
2001–02 Florida Atlantic Owls men's basketball team
Players
Coaches

Pos.	#	Name	Height	Weight	Year	Hometown
C	0	Nick Neumann	7 ft 0 in (2.13 m)	240 lb (109 kg)	Jr	St. Edwards	Stuart, Florida
F	1	Raheim Brown	6 ft 10 in (2.08 m)	210 lb (95 kg)	Sr	Colonial	Orlando, Florida
C	2	Robert Williams	6 ft 8 in (2.03 m)	240 lb (109 kg)	So	Haines City	Haines City, Florida
G	5	Earnest Crumbley	5 ft 10 in (1.78 m)	—	So	Lakewood	St. Petersburg, Florida
G	25	Jeff Cowans	6 ft 2 in (1.88 m)	170 lb (77 kg)	So	Dr. Phillips	Orlando, Florida

Head coach

- Sidney Green (UNLV)

Assistant coach(es)

Legend

- (C) Team captain
- (S) Suspended
- (I) Ineligible
- (W) Walk-on
- Injured
- Current redshirt

Roster

== Schedule and results ==
Date time, TV	Rank^{#}	Opponent^{#}	Result	Record	Site (attendance) city, state
Exhibition
Nov 10, 2001*; 7:00 p.m.		Nova Southeastern	W 85–75		FAU Arena; Boca Raton, Florida
Regular season
Nov 17, 2001*; 1:00 p.m.		at Hofstra	L 65–67	0–1	Mack Sports Complex (1,633); Hempstead, New York
Nov 20, 2001*; 7:00 p.m.		St. Mary's (MD)	W 107–73	1–1	FAU Arena (897); Boca Raton, Florida
Nov 26, 2001*; 7:30 p.m.		at Miami (FL)	L 48–74	1–2	Miami Arena (1,385); Miami, Florida
Nov 29, 2001; 7:00 p.m.		Stetson	W 82–71	2–2 (1–0)	FAU Arena (450); Boca Raton, Florida
Dec 1, 2001; 7:00 p.m.		UCF	W 78–66	3–2 (2–0)	FAU Arena (1,008); Boca Raton, Florida
Dec 4, 2001*; 7:30 p.m.		at Liberty	W 91–80	4–2	Vines Center (1,817); Lynchburg, Virginia
Dec 8, 2001*; 7:00 p.m.		VCU	L 84–88 ^{2OT}	4–3	FAU Arena (1,325); Boca Raton, Florida
Dec 17, 2001; 8:00 p.m.		at Samford	L 66–68 ^{OT}	4–4 (2–1)	Seibert Hall (920); Homewood, Alabama
Dec 19, 2001; 8:00 p.m.		at Jacksonville State	W 74–71	5–4 (3–1)	Pete Mathews Coliseum (1,152); Jacksonville, Alabama
Dec 27, 2001*; 7:00 p.m.		Drake	W 79–71	6–4	FAU Arena (1,124); Boca Raton, Florida
Jan 2, 2002; 7:00 p.m.		Jacksonville	L 58–73	6–5 (3–2)	FAU Arena (873); Boca Raton, Florida
Jan 5, 2002; 7:00 p.m.		Georgia State	W 90–77	7–5 (4–2)	FAU Arena (1,849); Boca Raton, Florida
Jan 7, 2002; 7:00 p.m.		Campbell	W 77–60	8–5 (5–2)	FAU Arena (1,413); Boca Raton, Florida
Jan 10, 2002; 7:30 p.m.		at Mercer	W 94–73	9–5 (6–2)	Macon Coliseum (336); Macon, Georgia
Jan 12, 2002; 8:00 p.m.		at Troy State	L 100–107 ^{2OT}	9–6 (6–3)	Sartain Hall (1,992); Troy, Alabama
Jan 16, 2002*; 8:00 p.m.		at Birmingham–Southern	L 59–65	9–7	Bill Battle Coliseum (535); Birmingham, Alabama
Jan 19, 2002; 7:00 p.m.		Belmont	W 69–66	10–7 (7–3)	FAU Arena (1,042); Boca Raton, Florida
Jan 22, 2002; 7:30 p.m.		at UCF	L 56–62	10–8 (7–4)	UCF Arena (1,010); Orlando, Florida
Jan 28, 2002; 8:00 p.m.		at Belmont	W 80–78	11–8 (8–4)	Nashville Municipal Auditorium (646); Nashville, Tennessee
Feb 2, 2002; 7:00 p.m.		Troy State	W 67–66	12–8 (9–4)	FAU Arena (1,943); Boca Raton, Florida
Feb 4, 2002; 7:00 p.m.		Mercer	W 72–71	13–8 (10–4)	FAU Arena (2,110); Boca Raton, Florida
Feb 7, 2002; 7:00 p.m.		at Campbell	L 87–92	13–9 (10–5)	Carter Gymnasium (712); Buies Creek, North Carolina
Feb 9, 2002; 6:00 p.m.		at Georgia State	L 71–76	13–10 (10–6)	GSU Sports Arena (2,752); Atlanta, Georgia
Feb 14, 2002; 7:00 p.m.		Jacksonville State	W 78–68	14–10 (11–6)	FAU Arena (833); Boca Raton, Florida
Feb 16, 2002; 7:00 p.m.		Samford	L 50–68	14–11 (11–7)	FAU Arena (1,603); Boca Raton, Florida
Feb 21, 2002; 7:30 p.m.		at Jacksonville	W 76–72	15–11 (12–7)	Swisher Gymnasium; Jacksonville, Florida
Feb 23, 2002; 7:00 p.m.		at Stetson	W 77–74	16–11 (13–7)	Edmunds Center (1,680); DeLand, Florida
ASUN tournament
Feb 28, 2002*	(3)	vs. (6) Jacksonville; Quarterfinals	W 59–50	17–11	UCF Arena (1,295); Orlando, Florida
Mar 1, 2002*; 8:15 p.m.	(3)	vs. (7) Jacksonville State; Semifinals	W 55–47	18–11	UCF Arena (1,711); Orlando, Florida
Mar 2, 2002*; 2:00 p.m.	(3)	vs. (1) Georgia State; Championship game	W 76–75	19–11	UCF Arena (662); Orlando, Florida
NCAA tournament
Mar 14, 2002*; 2:50 p.m.	(15 S)	vs. (2 S) No. 8 Alabama; First round	L 78–86	19–12	BI-LO Center (14,198); Greenville, South Carolina
*Non-conference game. ^{#}Rankings from AP Poll. (#) Tournament seedings in parentheses. S=South. All times are in Eastern.
