= Justice Archer =

Justice Archer may refer to:

- Dennis Archer (born 1942), associate justice of the Michigan Supreme Court
- Gail Archer (fl. 1980s–2020s), justice of the Supreme Court of Western Australia
- Philip Edward Archer (1925–2002), chief justice of Ghana
- Stevenson Archer (politician, born 1786), chief justice of the Maryland Court of Appeals

== See also ==
- Archer Allen Phlegar (1846–1912), Virginia Supreme Court justice
- Archer (surname)
- Archer (given name)
- Archer (disambiguation)
- Judge Archer (disambiguation)
