= The Cromwellian =

Coordinates: 51.4956°N 0.1739°W

The Cromwellian Club was a 1960s London nightclub at 3 Cromwell Road, South Kensington.

The Cromwellian was started in late 1964 by Tony Mitchell, and managed and part owned by Bob Archer.

Jimi Hendrix played there.
