= Jenny Archer =

Jennifer or Jenny Archer may refer to:

== People ==
- Jennifer Archer (born 1957), American romantic fiction writer
- Jennifer Archer (athlete), Barbadian high jumper in 1982 Central American and Caribbean Junior Championships in Athletics

== Fictional characters ==
- Jenny Archer (book series), a series of book by Ellen Conford
- Jenny Archer, character in The Age of Innocence 1993 film
- Jennifer Aldridge née Archer, character in the BBC radio soap opera The Archers
