= Phil Cunningham (basketball) =

American college basketball coach

Current position
- Title: Assistant Coach
- Team: Kansas State
- Conference: Big 12

Biographical details
- Born: October 17, 1966 (age 60); Paducah, Kentucky, U.S.

Playing career
- 1986–1987: Kentucky Wesleyan
- 1987–1990: Campbellsville

Coaching career (HC unless noted)
- 1990–1991: Campbellsville (assistant)
- 1991–1992: Mississippi State (GA)
- 1992–1995: Sue Bennett College
- 1995–1997: James Madison (assistant)
- 1997–1998: Georgia State (assistant)
- 1998–2000: Georgia State (AHC)
- 2000–2012: Mississippi State (assistant)
- 2012–2013: Western Kentucky (assistant)
- 2013–2019: Troy
- 2019–2023: Western Kentucky (AHC)
- 2024–2025: Louisiana–Monroe (assistant)
- 2025–2026: Louisiana–Monroe
- 2026–present: Kansas State (assistant)

Head coaching record
- Overall: 84–139 (.377)
- Tournaments: 0–1 (NCAA Division I)

Accomplishments and honors

Championships
- Sun Belt tournament (2017)

Phillip Tucker Cunningham (born October 17, 1966) is an American college basketball coach who is currently an assistant coach at Kansas State University. He previously served as the head coach at Troy University and the University of Louisiana-Monroe.

== Early life ==
Born in Paducah, Kentucky and a native of Campbellsville, Kentucky, Cunningham played collegiately at Kentucky Wesleyan College. After two seasons playing for the Panthers, where he won a Division II national championship in 1987, Cunningham decided to transfer to Campbellsville College (now known as Campbellsville University) to play for his father.

== Coaching career ==
After his playing career, Cunningham was an assistant coach for several different schools, including a twelve-year stint at Mississippi State during which he was named by Rivals as one of the nation's top 25 assistant coaches. He was also previously recognized by The Hoop Scoop recruiting publication as one of the top NCAA Division I men's basketball assistant coaches.

Cunningham was the head coach at Troy University from 2013 to 2019, compiling 80 wins throughout his six-year tenure. During his time with Troy, Cunningham led the school to their first NCAA tournament appearance in 14 years after winning the 2017 Sun Belt Conference tournament championship. Cunningham was named the head coach at Troy after coach Don Maestri retired after serving as head coach at Troy for 31 years.

In 2025, Cunningham was hired as the head men's basketball coach at the University of Louisiana-Monroe. After one season, he was dismissed as the head coach of the Warhawks.

== Head coaching record ==
Record table
Season	Team	Overall	Conference	Standing	Postseason
Troy Trojans (Sun Belt Conference) (2013–2019)
2013–14	Troy	11–20	6–12	8th	
2014–15	Troy	10–19	5–15	11th	
2015–16	Troy	9–22	4–16	11th	
2016–17	Troy	22–15	10–8	T–6th	NCAA Division I First Round
2017–18	Troy	16–17	9–9	T–5th	
2018–19	Troy	12–18	5–13	T–11th	
Troy:		80–111 (.419)	39–73 (.348)		
Louisiana–Monroe Warhawks (Sun Belt Conference) (2025–2026)
2025–26	Louisiana–Monroe	4–28	1–17	14th	
Louisiana–Monroe:		4–28 (.125)	1–17 (.056)		
Total:		84–139 (.377)			
National champion Postseason invitational champion Conference regular season champion Conference regular season and conference tournament champion Division regular season champion Division regular season and conference tournament champion Conference tournament champion
