= Jack Archer =

Jack Archer may refer to:

- Jack Archer (sprinter) (1921–1997), English Olympic athlete
- Jack Archer (actor), British and Irish actor
- Jack Archer, fictional character in the third-person shooter video game Robotech: Battlecry
- Jack Archer, fictional character in the British radio soap opera the Archers

== See also ==
- Jackson Archer (born 2003), Australian rules footballer for North Melbourne
- John Archer (disambiguation)
