= 2003 Atlantic Sun men's basketball tournament =

- Classification: Division I
- Season: 2002–03
- Teams: 8
- Site: GSU Sports Arena; Atlanta, GA
- Champions: Troy State (1st title)
- Winning coach: Don Maestri (1st title)
- MVP: Ben Fletcher (Troy State)

2002–03 Atlantic Sun men's basketball standings
	Conf.				Overall
Team	W		L	PCT	W		L	PCT
North
Belmont	12	–	4	.750	17	–	12	.586
Jacksonville State	10	–	6	.625	20	–	10	.667
Samford	9	–	7	.563	13	–	15	.464
Georgia State	8	–	8	.500	14	–	15	.483
Gardner–Webb	2	–	14	.125	5	–	24	.172
Campbell	1	–	15	.063	5	–	22	.185
South
Troy State †	14	–	2	.875	26	–	6	.813
Mercer	14	–	2	.875	23	–	6	.793
UCF	11	–	5	.688	21	–	11	.656
Jacksonville	8	–	8	.500	13	–	16	.448
Stetson	4	–	12	.250	7	–	20	.259
Florida Atlantic	3	–	13	.188	7	–	21	.250
† 2003 Atlantic Sun Tournament winner As of March 4, 2003; Rankings from AP Poll

The 2003 Atlantic Sun men's basketball tournament was held March 6–8 at the GSU Sports Arena at Georgia State University in Atlanta, Georgia.

Troy State defeated UCF in the championship game, 80–69, to win their first Atlantic Sun men's basketball tournament.

The Trojans, therefore, received the Atlantic Sun's automatic bid to the 2003 NCAA tournament, their first appearance in the Division I tournament.

== Format ==
The Atlantic Sun's membership remained fixed at twelve, so no changes to the format were required. As such, only the top eight teams from the conference tournament were eligible for the tournament. These eight teams were seeded based on regular season conference records.

== Bracket ==
Quarterfinals; Thursday, March 6
1	Mercer	73
8	Jacksonville	57
4	Jacksonville State	51
5	UCF	68
3	Troy State	70
6	Samford	54
2	Belmont	58
7	Georgia State	76

Semifinals; Friday, March 7
1	Mercer	59
5	UCF	79
3	Troy State	71
7	Georgia State	61

Championship; Saturday, March 8
5	UCF	69
3	Troy State	80
