= Adam Howard =

American basketball coach and player

Current position
- Title: Head coach
- Team: Troy
- Conference: Sun Belt
- Record: 0–2 (.000)

Biographical details
- Born: 1984 or 1985 (age 40–41); Ashland, Kentucky, U.S.

Playing career
- 2004–2008: Western Kentucky
- Position: Point guard

Coaching career (HC unless noted)
- 2009–2010: Morehead State (GA)
- 2010–2012: Morehead State (assistant)
- 2012–2014: Southern Miss (assistant)
- 2014: Tennessee (assistant)
- 2016–2018: Troy (assistant)
- 2018–2022: South Alabama (AHC)
- 2022–2025: Nebraska (assistant)
- 2025–2026: NC State (assistant)
- 2026–present: Troy

Head coaching record
- Overall: 0–2 (.000)

Adam Howard (born 1984 or 1985) is an American basketball coach and former player. He is currently the head coach for the Troy Trojans. He played college basketball for the Western Kentucky Hilltoppers and has previously worked as a coach for the Morehead State Eagles, Southern Miss Golden Eagles, Tennessee Volunteers, South Alabama Jaguars, Nebraska Cornhuskers and NC State Wolfpack.

== Early life ==
Howard is from Ashland, Kentucky. He attended Paul G. Blazer High School and graduated in 2004. He played basketball as a point guard and scored 831 points in his high school career, after which he attended Western Kentucky University and played for the Western Kentucky Hilltoppers from 2004 to 2008. Across four seasons with the Hilltoppers, he scored 43 points, while the team made the postseason in three of those years. Howard graduated from Western Kentucky with a bachelor's degree in mass communication.

== Coaching career ==
=== Assistant coach (2009–2026) ===
After Howard's graduation from college, he served as a graduate assistant for the Morehead State Eagles from 2009 to 2010 and then as an assistant coach from 2010 to 2012, helping them win a game in the NCAA Tournament in his second year. He followed head coach Donnie Tyndall to the Southern Miss Golden Eagles in 2012 and served two seasons as an assistant there before joining Tyndall as an assistant coach for the Tennessee Volunteers in 2014. He was the second-youngest assistant coach in the Southeastern Conference (SEC) while at Tennessee but resigned mid-season for personal reasons.

Howard returned to coaching in 2016 as an assistant coach for the Troy Trojans, serving until 2018 in that role. During his time at Troy, he helped them to a Sun Belt Conference tournament title and an NCAA Tournament appearance. He then joined the South Alabama Jaguars in 2018 and served as associate head coach until he left to become an assistant for the Nebraska Cornhuskers in 2022. Howard served three seasons at Nebraska, then joined the NC State Wolfpack as an assistant coach in 2025.

=== Troy (2026–present) ===
In March 2026, Howard returned to Troy University, replacing Scott Cross as head coach.

== Head coaching record ==
Record table
Season	Team	Overall	Conference	Standing	Postseason
Troy Trojans (Sun Belt Conference) (2026–present)
2026–27	Troy	0–2	0–0		
Troy:		0–2 (.000)	0–0 (–)		
Total:		0–2 (.000)			
