= Judge Archer =

Judge Archer may refer to:

- Glenn L. Archer Jr. (1929–2011), judge of the U.S. Court of Appeals for the Federal Circuit.
- John Archer (judge) (1598–1682), English judge
- John L'Archers (died 1349), English-born Irish judge
- Lawrence Archer (1820–1910), American lawyer, politician, and Santa Clara County judge
- Stevenson Archer (politician, born 1827), judge of the Cecil County court of Maryland
- Judge Archer (Chinese: 箭士柳白猿), a 2016 Mandarin-language Chinese period drama martial arts film, see List of Chinese films of 2016

== See also ==
- Archery judge, see Target archery
- Justice Archer (disambiguation)
