= 2002–03 Troy State Trojans men's basketball team =

American college basketball season

2002–03 Troy Trojans men's basketball

ASUN tournament champions

NCAA tournament, first round
- Conference: ASUN Conference
- Record: 26–6 (14–2 ASUN)
- Head coach: Don Maestri (21st season)
- Home arena: Trojan Arena (Capacity 5,200)

2002–03 Atlantic Sun men's basketball standings
	Conf.				Overall
Team	W		L	PCT	W		L	PCT
North
Belmont	12	–	4	.750	17	–	12	.586
Jacksonville State	10	–	6	.625	20	–	10	.667
Samford	9	–	7	.563	13	–	15	.464
Georgia State	8	–	8	.500	14	–	15	.483
Gardner–Webb	2	–	14	.125	5	–	24	.172
Campbell	1	–	15	.063	5	–	22	.185
South
Troy State †	14	–	2	.875	26	–	6	.813
Mercer	14	–	2	.875	23	–	6	.793
UCF	11	–	5	.688	21	–	11	.656
Jacksonville	8	–	8	.500	13	–	16	.448
Stetson	4	–	12	.250	7	–	20	.259
Florida Atlantic	3	–	13	.188	7	–	21	.250
† 2003 Atlantic Sun Tournament winner As of March 4, 2003; Rankings from AP Poll

The 2002–03 Troy State Trojans men's basketball team represented Troy University during the 2002–03 NCAA Division I men's basketball season. The Trojans, led by 21st-year head coach Don Maestri, played their home games at Trojan Arena in Troy, Alabama and were members of the Sun Belt Conference. They finished the season 26–6, 14–2 in Sun Belt play to finish atop the conference regular season standings. They defeated Samford, Georgia State, and Central Florida to win the Sun Belt tournament championship. As a result, they received the conference's automatic bid to the NCAA tournament – the first in program history. As the No. 14 seed in the South region, they were beaten by Xavier in the opening round.

== Roster ==
2002–03 Troy Trojans men's basketball team
Players	Coaches
Pos. / # / Name / Height / Weight / Year / Hometown; G / / Ben Fletcher / 6 ft 3 in (1.91 m) / 185 lb (84 kg) / Sr / Selma, Alabama	Head coach: Don Maestri (Southern Miss); Assistant coach(es) Legend: (C) Team captain; (S) Suspended; (I) Ineligible; (W) Walk-on; Injured; Current redshirt; Roster

== Schedule and results ==
Date time, TV	Rank^{#}	Opponent^{#}	Result	Record	Site (attendance) city, state
Non-conference regular season
Dec 3, 2002*		at Arkansas	W 74–66	4–1	Bud Walton Arena; Fayetteville, Arkansas
Dec 17, 2002*		at Georgia Tech	L 66–88	6–2	Alexander Memorial Coliseum; Atlanta, Georgia
Dec 20, 2002*		vs. Northeastern	W 89–72	7–2	Mario Morales Coliseum; Guaynabo, Puerto Rico
Dec 21, 2002*		vs. Duquesne	W 73–69	8–2	Mario Morales Coliseum; Guaynabo, Puerto Rico
Dec 22, 2002*		vs. Auburn	L 66–94	8–3	Mario Morales Coliseum; Guaynabo, Puerto Rico
Sun Belt Conference regular season
Jan 4, 2003		at Jacksonville	W 70–68	10–3 (1–0)	Swisher Gymnasium; Jacksonville, Florida
Mar 1, 2003		Jacksonville	W 94–72	23–5 (14–2)	Trojan Arena; Troy, Alabama
ASUN tournament
Mar 6, 2003*		vs. Samford; Quarterfinals	W 70–54	24–5	GSU Sports Arena; Atlanta, Georgia
Mar 7, 2003*		at Georgia State; Semifinals	W 71–61	25–5	GSU Sports Arena; Atlanta, Georgia
Mar 8, 2003*		vs. Central Florida; Championship game	W 80–69	26–5	GSU Sports Arena; Atlanta, Georgia
NCAA tournament
Mar 21, 2003*	(14 S)	vs. (3 S) No. 12 Xavier; First round	L 59–71	26–6	Gaylord Entertainment Center; Nashville, Tennessee
*Non-conference game. ^{#}Rankings from AP Poll. (#) Tournament seedings in parentheses. S=South Region. All times are in Central Time.
