= Wes Bizilia =

American basketball player and coach

Biographical details
- Born: September 9, 1936; Sayre, Pennsylvania, U.S.
- Died: March 23, 2011 (aged 74); Alabama, U.S.

Playing career
- 1956–1960: West Alabama
- Position: Guard

Coaching career (HC unless noted)
- 1973–1982: Troy

Head coaching record
- Overall: 102-129

Wesley Michael Bizilia (September 9, 1936 – March 23, 2011) was an American basketball coach who served as head coach of the Troy State Trojans from 1973–1982. He was the fourth coach in the history of the Troy basketball program and accumulated a record of 102–129 in his nine seasons as head coach.

Bizilia died from cancer, aged 74.
