= 2002 Atlantic Sun men's basketball tournament =

- Classification: Division I
- Season: 2001–02
- Teams: 8
- Site: Curb Event Center; Nashville, TN
- Champions: Florida Atlantic (1st title)
- Winning coach: Sidney Green (1st title)
- MVP: Thomas Terrell (Georgia State)

2001–02 Atlantic Sun men's basketball standings
	Conf.				Overall
Team	W		L	PCT	W		L	PCT
Georgia State	14	–	6	.700	20	–	11	.645
Troy State	14	–	6	.700	18	–	10	.643
Florida Atlantic †	13	–	7	.650	19	–	12	.613
Jacksonville	12	–	8	.600	18	–	12	.600
UCF	12	–	8	.600	17	–	12	.586
Samford	12	–	8	.600	15	–	14	.517
Jacksonville State	8	–	12	.400	13	–	16	.448
Belmont	8	–	12	.400	11	–	17	.393
Stetson	7	–	13	.350	10	–	16	.385
Campbell	6	–	14	.300	8	–	19	.296
Mercer	4	–	16	.200	6	–	23	.207
† 2002 Atlantic Sun Tournament winner As of March 4, 2003; Rankings from AP Poll

The 2002 Atlantic Sun men's basketball tournament was held February 28–March 2 at the Curb Event Center at Belmont University in Nashville, Tennessee. This was the first Atlantic Sun tournament after the conference changed its name from the Trans America Athletic Conference.

Florida Atlantic defeated defending champions Georgia State in the championship game, 76–75, to win their first Atlantic Sun men's basketball tournament.

The Owls, therefore, received the Atlantic Sun's automatic bid to the 2002 NCAA tournament, their first appearance in the Division I tournament.

== Format ==
The Atlantic Sun added Belmont as their eleventh member prior to the season. However, the tournament reverted to its old format whereby only the top eight teams from the conference tournament were eligible for the tournament. These eight teams were seeded based on regular season conference records.

== Bracket ==
Quarterfinals; Thursday, February 28
1	Georgia State	82
8	Belmont	79
5	UCF	84
4	Samford	74
3	Florida Atlantic	59
6	Jacksonville	50
7	Jacksonville State	69
2	Troy State	62

Semifinals; Friday, March 1
1	Georgia State	82
5	UCF	64
3	Florida Atlantic	55
7	Jacksonville State	47

Championship; Saturday, March 2
1	Georgia State	75
3	Florida Atlantic	76
