= John Archer (physician) =

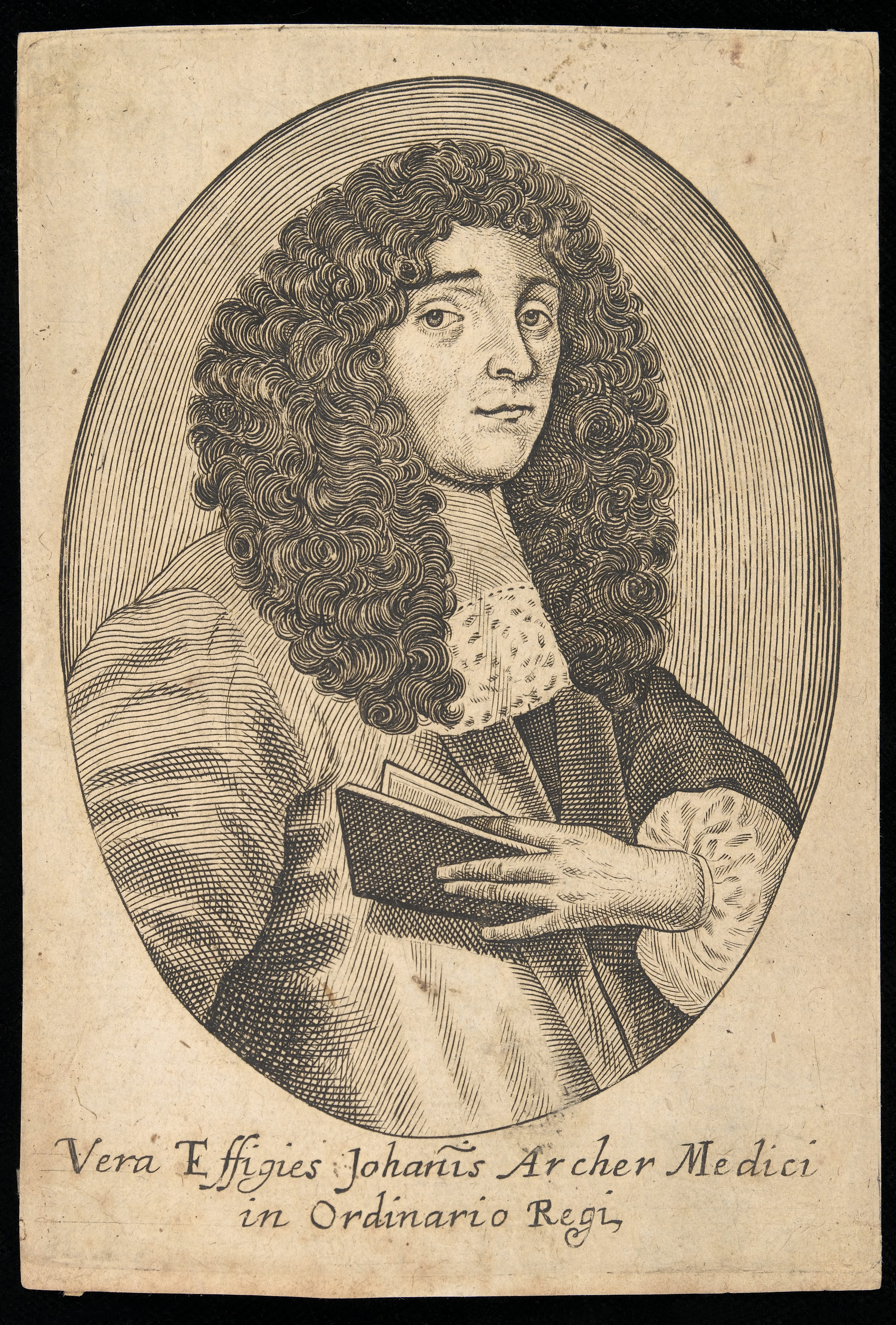
- Born: Probably Ireland
- Died: Probably London
- Occupation: Medical Physician
- Known for: Physician to the court of King Charles II

John Archer (fl. 1660–1684) was court physician in the reign of Charles II.

== Unknown origins ==
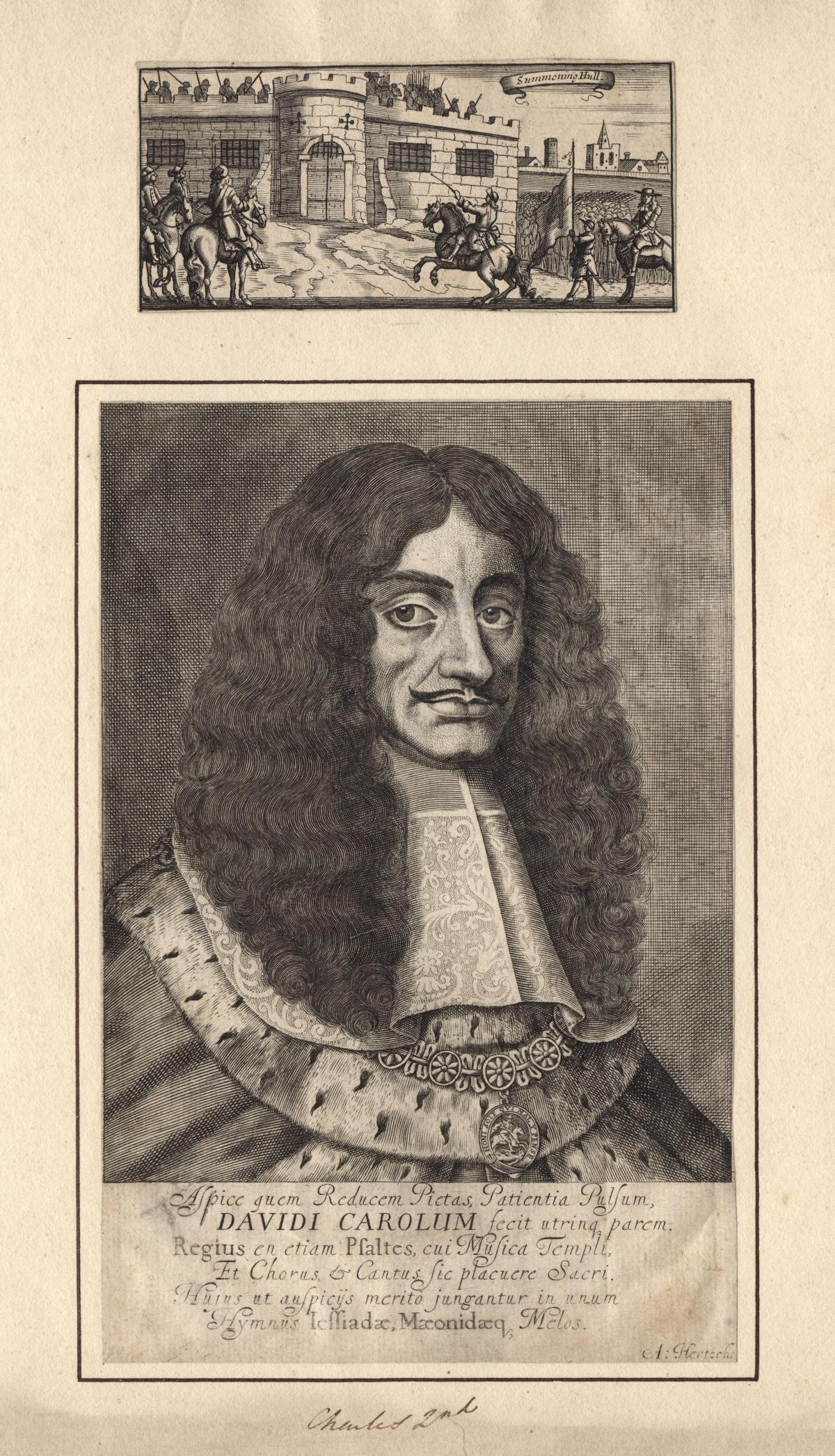
Archer was court physician to King Charles II

Of his origin nothing is certainly known; but he was probably an English Protestant born in Ireland, as he speaks of having been in practice in Dublin in 1660. Irish Catholics were not educated as physicians in the 17th century (see Statutes of Kilkenny and Irish Penal Laws.) He afterwards lived in London, and was styled 'Chymical Physitian in Ordinary to the King' (1671); afterwards, on his engraved portrait, he is called simply 'medicus in ordinario regi' (1684). He boasts that, on the favorable report of some of his patients, his majesty was pleased to command him 'to help some noble persons afflicted with a fistule.' He was never a member of, or in any way licensed by, the College of Physicians.

In fact Archer, although a royal physician, was what would be called in these days an advertising quack. His book, 'Every Man his own Doctor,' purporting to be a manual of health, but really treating of various diseases, reputable and disreputable, especially the latter, was nothing but an advertisement. He promises marvelous cures by secret remedies, sold only by himself, and able even to insure immunity beforehand from the possible consequences of debauchery. It is written in a style at once prurient and hypocritical. The British Museum copy of this work has written on the fly-leaf, in a contemporary hand — and probably a similar advertisement was written in every copy before it was sold — the following notice: 'The author is to be spoke with at his chamber in a sadler's house over against the mewes gate next the Black Horse nigh Charing Cross; his howers there are from eleven to five in the evening, at other times at his house in Knightsbridge.'

== Secretive trader ==
His only medicines were certain nostrums of his own preparation, 'to be had only from the author at his house in Winchester Street, near Gresham College,' and at prices which seem high. His books were also sold by himself. Archer's 'Secrets Disclosed, of Consumption, &c.' is a book of the same stamp, and in part a repetition of the former. His 'Herbal' is worthless.

== The odd inventor ==
Archer also boasts of three inventions—a vapour-bath, a new kind of oven and a chariot which enabled one horse to do the work of two. The only interest attaching to these discreditable works and their author is the singular fact that a man who might in the present day even be liable to prosecution, should in the reign of Charles II have enjoyed the status of the king's physician.

The titles of his works, alluded to above, are: 1. 'Every Man his own Doctor, completed with an Herbal, &c.' by John Archer, one of his Majesty's Physicians in Ordinary. 2nd edition. London, printed for the Author, and are to be sold at his house, 1673 (1st edition 1671). 2. 'Secrets Disclosed, of Consumption, showing how to distinguish between Scurvy and Venereal Disease, &c.' by John Archer. London, printed for the Author, 1684.
