= Ruby Archer =

American poet

- Born: January 28, 1873; Kansas City, Missouri
- Died: January 23, 1961 (aged 87); Los Angeles, California
- Other names: Ruby Archer Doud, Ruby Archer Gray
- Occupation: Poet

Ruby Archer (Ruby Archer Doud or Ruby Archer Gray) (January 28, 1873, in Kansas City, Missouri – January 23, 1961, in Los Angeles, California) was an American poet.

She was educated at Kansas City High School and by private tutors. She was married to Dr. Frank Newland Doud on March 27, 1910 and later to Benjamin Franklin Gray. She contributed poems, translations from French and German dramas and lyrics, and prose articles on art, architecture, music, Biblical literature, philosophy, etc. to papers and magazines.

== Collection ==
- Little Poems by Ruby Archer, a reprint of the 1900 edition by Kessinger Publishing (2009), ISBN 1-1203-1816-5
