= John Archer (footballer, born 1936) =

English footballer

Personal information
- Full name: John George Archer
- Date of birth: 9 April 1936
- Place of birth: Whitstable, England
- Date of death: 28 May 1987 (aged 51)
- Position: Goalkeeper

Senior career*
| Years | Team | Apps | (Gls) |
| 1952–1954 | Whitstable Town | | |
| 1954–1955 | Grimsby Town | 10 | (0) |
| 1955–1956 | Whitstable Town | | |
| 1956–1958 | Canterbury City | | |
| 1958–1959 | Whitstable Town | | |
| 1959–1960 | Ashford Town (Kent) | 24 | (0) |
| 1960–1961 | Margate | | |
| 1963–1964 | Whitstable Town | | |
- * Club domestic league appearances and goals

John George Archer (9 April 1936 – 1987) was an English professional footballer who played as a goalkeeper.

After starting his career at hometown Kent League club Whitstable Town he transferred to Football League Third Division North club Grimsby Town for whom, whilst only 18 years old, he made 10 appearances during which he saved three successive penalties.

Early in 1955, having been granted release from his contract with Grimsby, he returned to Whitstable. Thereafter he turned out for other Kent clubs Canterbury City, a third spell at Whitstable Town, Ashford Town and Margate before returning in 1963 as an Amateur player to now Aetolian League Whitstable Town. "Bonny" as he was locally known made a total of over 100 appearances over his four spells at Whitstable Town - his last two matches in April 1964 were notable: he was sent-off in the first and left the field injured in the second.
