= George Archer (disambiguation) =

George Archer (1939–2005) was an American golfer.

George Archer may also refer to:

- George Archer (architect) (1848–1920), American architect
- George A. Archer (1850–1932), American businessman
- George E. Archer (1853–1903), chief architect of the Erie Railroad
- George Archer (politician) (1881–1956), Australian politician

== See also ==
- George Archer-Shee (1895–1914), Royal Navy cadet
