= Val Archer =

British oil painter and teacher

- Born: Val Archer; 1946 (age 79–80); Northampton, England
- Education: Manchester School of Art; Royal College of Art
- Occupations: Oil painter, teacher
- Known for: Still life paintings
- Notable work: A Basket of Berries (1992), A Basket of Apples (1993), The Painter, the Cook and the Art of Cucina (2006)
- Awards: Anstruther Prize for painting (1970)

Val Archer (born 1946) is a British oil painter and teacher who is known for her meticulously composed still life paintings.

== Early life and education ==
Archer was born in Northampton where her father was an engineer and her mother was a bookbinder. Archer attended Saturday morning art classes taught by Henry Bird at the Northampton School for Art. She studied at the Manchester School of Art from 1964 until 1968 when she entered the Royal College of Art, RCA.

== Career ==
At the RCA Archer won the Anstruther Prize for painting in 1970 before graduating the following year. After graduating, Archer undertook several commercial commissions and also held a number of visiting lectureships throughout her career. Her teaching included courses at the Crawford School of Art in Cork and at Cardiff College of Art. She also spent time teaching at the art schools in Chelsea, at Goldsmiths' College, Sheffield and Wolverhampton. Archer's commercial work included a 1982 poster design for British Rail and designs for the BBC Good Food magazine in the early 1990s.

In 1989 Archer had a solo exhibition of flower paintings at the Noortman Gallery in Maastricht. She also had an exhibition in Germany. Archer illustrated and published two books on fruit and flowers, A Basket of Berries in 1992 and A Basket of Apples the following year. Since 1998 Archer has been represented by the Chris Beetles Gallery in London. In 2006 Archer co-wrote an illustrated travel and food book about Italy called The Painter, the Cook and the Art of Cucina with Anna Del Conte.
