= Kellie Archer =

American biostatistician

- Born: Kellie Jo Archer; 1969 (age 56–57)
- Education: Franklin College, Ohio State University
- Occupations: biostatistician, professor
- Employers: Virginia Commonwealth University, Ohio State University, professor of biostatistics
- Known for: microarray analysis techniques

Kellie Jo Archer (born 1969) is a biostatistician specializing in microarray analysis techniques. She is a professor of biostatistics and chair of the biostatistics department at the Ohio State University.

== Education and career ==
Archer graduated summa cum laude from Franklin College in 1991. After earning a master's degree at the Ohio State University in 1993, she worked for several years as a medical data analyst before completing her Ph.D. at the Ohio State University College of Public Health in 2001. Her dissertation, Goodness-of-Fit for Logistic Regression Models Developed Using Data Collected from a Complex Sampling Design, was supervised by Stanley Lemeshow.

She became an assistant professor at Virginia Commonwealth University in 2002, earning tenure there in 2009, becoming director of the VCU Massey Cancer Center Biostatistics Shared Resource in 2011, and being promoted to full professor in 2015. She moved to Ohio State in 2016, and continues to hold an affiliate position at Virginia Commonwealth University.

== Recognition ==
Archer was named a Fellow of the American Statistical Association in 2021. She was elected chair of the ASA Statistical Learning and Data Science section in 2021.
