= Rosalind Archer =

New Zealand petroleum engineer and academic

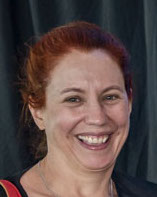
- Born: Rosalind Ann Archer
- Education: Stanford University
- Scientific career
- Fields: Hydrocarbon and geothermal modelling
- Workplaces: Griffith University
- Thesis: Computing flow and pressure transients in heterogeneous media using boundary element methods (2000)
- Doctoral advisor: Roland Horne

Rosalind Ann Archer is a New Zealand engineer and academic. She is currently Head of the School of Engineering and Built Environment at Griffith University.

== Academic career ==
After a 2000 PhD titled 'Computing flow and pressure transients in heterogeneous media using boundary element methods' at Stanford University, Archer moved to Texas A&M University and then to the University of Auckland in 2002, rising to full professor in 2013. In 2013 she also became head of the University of Auckland's Department of Engineering Science. She held the Mercury / Mighty River Power Chair in Geothermal Reservoir Engineering from 2013 to 2018.

She won the Society of Petroleum Engineers Regional Distinguished Achievement Award for Petroleum Engineering Faculty (Asia Pacific Region) in 2011, and was the first New Zealand-based engineer to be awarded the position of "distinguished member" of the Society of Petroleum Engineers in 2015. In 2016, she won the Deloitte Energy Engineer of the Year award. She is a Fellow of Engineering NZ was elected deputy president of that organisation in 2020. In March 2021, she was elected president of Engineering New Zealand. In December 2021, Rosalind took up a new role as Head of the School of Engineering and Built Environment at Griffith University in Queensland.

== Selected works ==
- O'Sullivan, J. P., R. A. Archer, and R. G. J. Flay. "Consistent boundary conditions for flows within the atmospheric boundary layer." Journal of Wind Engineering and Industrial Aerodynamics 99, no. 1 (2011): 65–77.
- Archer, Rosalind Ann. "Impact of stress sensitive permeability on production data analysis." In SPE unconventional reservoirs conference. Society of Petroleum Engineers, 2008.
- Londono, Fabio E., Rosalind A. Archer, and Thomas A. Blasingame. "Correlations for hydrocarbon gas viscosity and gas density-validation and correlation of behavior using a large-scale database." SPE Reservoir Evaluation & Engineering 8, no. 06 (2005): 561–572.
- Archer, Rosalind, Gary Nates, Stuart Donovan, and Hamish Waterer. "Wind turbine interference in a wind farm layout optimization mixed integer linear programming model." Wind Engineering 35, no. 2 (2011): 165–175.
- Zink, Florian, Hamish Waterer, Rosalind Archer, and Laura Schaefer. "Geometric optimization of a thermoacoustic regenerator." International Journal of Thermal Sciences 48, no. 12 (2009): 2309–2322.
