= Sidney Green (basketball) =

American basketball player and coach (born 1961)

Personal information
- Born: January 4, 1961 (age 65) Brooklyn, New York, U.S.
- Listed height: 6 ft 9 in (2.06 m)
- Listed weight: 220 lb (100 kg)

Career information
- High school: Thomas Jefferson (Brooklyn, New York)
- College: UNLV (1979–1983)
- NBA draft: 1983: 1st round, 5th overall pick
- Drafted by: Chicago Bulls
- Playing career: 1983–1993
- Position: Power forward / center
- Number: 21, 12, 44
- Coaching career: 1995–2005

Career history

Playing
- 1983–1986: Chicago Bulls
- 1986–1987: Detroit Pistons
- 1987–1989: New York Knicks
- 1989–1990: Orlando Magic
- 1990–1992: San Antonio Spurs
- 1992–1993: Charlotte Hornets

Coaching
- 1995–1997: Southampton College
- 1997–1999: North Florida
- 1999–2005: Florida Atlantic

Career highlights
- As player: Consensus second-team All-American (1983); Big West Player of the Year (1983); No. 21 retired by UNLV Runnin' Rebels; McDonald's All-American (1979); Third-team Parade All-American (1979); As coach: Atlantic Sun tournament champion (2002)

Career NBA statistics
- Points: 5,080 (7.5 ppg)
- Rebounds: 4,128 (6.1 rpg)
- Assists: 635 (0.9 apg)
- Stats at NBA.com
- Stats at Basketball Reference

Sidney Green (born January 4, 1961) is an American former professional basketball player and former coach. He played college basketball for the UNLV Runnin' Rebels and was drafted into the National Basketball Association (NBA) by the Chicago Bulls in 1983. After a ten-year career in the NBA he went into college coaching. He now works as a Chicago Bulls team ambassador.

== Life ==
Green was born in Brooklyn, New York. A 6'9" forward/center, Green attended the University of Nevada, Las Vegas, where he played for the UNLV Runnin' Rebels basketball team. Green's final game for UNLV was the team's second round loss to eventual champion North Carolina State in 1983. He was an All-American selection, and was drafted by the Chicago Bulls in the first round of the 1983 NBA draft. In his ten-year NBA career, he played for the Bulls, Detroit Pistons, New York Knicks, Orlando Magic, San Antonio Spurs and Charlotte Hornets. He retired in 1993 with 5,080 career points and 4,128 career rebounds.

After retiring from the NBA, Green went into coaching. He coached at Southampton College from 1995 to 1997, and was head coach of the University of North Florida Ospreys from 1997 to 1999, and the Florida Atlantic University Owls from 1999 to 2005. On September 24, 2009, Green was named a player development assistant for the Chicago Bulls. He later became a Bulls community relations ambassador.

His son, Taurean Green, played for the University of Florida team that won the 2006 and 2007 NCAA Men's Division I Basketball Championships. Taurean Green has also played professionally in the NBA and in Europe.

== NBA career statistics ==
Legend
GP	Games played	GS	Games started	MPG	Minutes per game
FG%	Field goal percentage	3P%	3-point field goal percentage	FT%	Free throw percentage
RPG	Rebounds per game	APG	Assists per game	SPG	Steals per game
BPG	Blocks per game	PPG	Points per game	**Bold**	Career high

=== Regular season ===
Year	Team	GP	GS	MPG	FG%	3P%	FT%	RPG	APG	SPG	BPG	PPG
1983–84	Chicago	49	0	13.6	.437	—	.714	3.6	.5	.4	.3	5.2
1984–85	Chicago	48	1	15.4	.432	.000	.806	5.1	.6	.2	.3	6.1
1985–86	Chicago	80	68	**28.8**	.465	.000	.782	**8.2**	1.7	**.9**	.5	**13.5**
1986–87	Detroit	80	**69**	22.4	**.472**	.000	.672	**8.2**	.8	.5	**.6**	7.9
1987–88	New York	**82**	65	25.0	.441	.000	.663	7.8	1.1	.8	.4	7.8
1988–89	New York	**82**	0	15.6	.460	.000	.759	4.8	.9	.6	.2	6.3
1989–90	Orlando	73	31	25.5	.468	**.333**	.651	8.1	**3.2**	.6	.1	10.4
1990–91	San Antonio	66	7	16.7	.461	.000	.848	4.7	.8	.5	.2	6.7
1991–92	San Antonio	80	1	14.1	.427	—	.820	4.3	.5	.4	.1	4.6
1992–93	San Antonio	15	0	13.5	.408	—	**.867**	4.7	1.3	.3	.2	3.5
1992–93	Charlotte	24	0	5.3	.350	.000	.750	2.0	.2	.0	.1	1.7
Career		679	242	19.5	.454	.037	.738	6.1	.9	.5	.3	7.5

=== Playoffs ===
Year	Team	GP	GS	MPG	FG%	3P%	FT%	RPG	APG	SPG	BPG	PPG
1985	Chicago	3	0	18.0	.500	—	.636	5.0	.7	.0	**.3**	**10.3**
1986	Chicago	3	0	17.7	.300	—	.500	4.0	.0	**.3**	**.3**	6.0
1987	Detroit	**9**	0	4.7	**.600**	—	.833	1.0	.1	.1	.2	1.9
1988	New York	4	**4**	**23.3**	.471	—	—	**8.3**	**1.8**	.0	**.3**	4.0
1989	New York	**9**	0	14.2	.413	—	.714	4.0	.6	.2	.1	4.0
1991	San Antonio	3	0	3.7	.500	—	**1.000**	1.3	.0	.0	.0	2.7
1992	San Antonio	3	0	15.7	.300	—	.750	3.7	.7	.0	.0	3.0
1993	Charlotte	**9**	0	8.7	.389	—	.333	3.2	.1	.1	.1	1.7
Career		43	4	11.8	.430	—	.654	3.5	.4	.1	.2	3.5

== Head coaching record ==
Record table
Season	Team	Overall	Conference	Standing	Postseason
LIU Southampton Colonials (New York Collegiate Athletic Conference) (1995–1997)
1995–96	LIU Southampton	16–13	12–10		
1996–97	LIU Southampton	13–14	10–12		
LIU Southampton:		27–29 (.482)	22–22 (.500)		
North Florida Ospreys (Peach Belt Conference) (1997–1999)
1997–98	North Florida	8–17	4–12	T-5th	
1998–99	North Florida	12–16	8–8	4th	
North Florida:		20–33 (.377)	12–20 (.375)		
Florida Atlantic Owls (Trans America Athletic / Atlantic Sun Conference) (1999–2005)
1999–2000	Florida Atlantic	2–28	0–18	10th	
2000–01	Florida Atlantic	7–24	5–13	T–8th	
2001–02	Florida Atlantic	19–12	13–7	3rd	NCAA Division I Round of 64
2002–03	Florida Atlantic	7–21	3–13	6th (South)	
2003–04	Florida Atlantic	9–19	6–14	T–8th	
2004–05	Florida Atlantic	10–17	10–10	T–8th	
Florida Atlantic:		54–121 (.309)	37–112 (.248)		
Total:		103–181 (.363)	71–154 (.316)		
National champion Postseason invitational champion Conference regular season champion Conference regular season and conference tournament champion Division regular season champion Division regular season and conference tournament champion Conference tournament champion

== See also ==
- List of NCAA Division I men's basketball players with 2000 points and 1000 rebounds
