= Archer (given name) =

Archer is a given name. Notable people with this name include:

- Archer Alexander (c. 1810–1879), former black slave who served as the model for the slave in the statue variously known as Freedom Memorial and the Emancipation Memorial in Lincoln Park, Washington, DC
- Archer Baldwin (1883–1966), British Member of Parliament
- Archer Blood (1923–2004), American diplomat in Bangladesh
- Sir Archer Croft, 2nd Baronet (1683–1753), Member of Parliament
- Archer T. Gammon (1918–1945), US Army soldier and posthumous recipient of the Medal of Honor
- Archer Thompson Gurney (1820–1887), Church of England clergyman and hymn writer
- Archer Butler Hulbert (1873–1933), historical geographer, writer, professor of American history and newspaper editor
- Archer Milton Huntington (1870–1955), American historian and philanthropist
- Archer King (1917–2012), American theatrical agent, producer and actor
- Archer Maclean (1962–2022), British video game programmer
- Archer MacMackin (1888–1961), American silent film director, producer and screenwriter
- Archer Martin (1910–2002), British chemist and Nobel laureate
- Archer Mathews (1744–1796), American pioneer and politician
- Archer James Oliver (1774–1842), British painter
- Archer Allen Phlegar (1846–1912), Virginia state senator and Virginia Supreme Court justice
- Archer Prewitt (born 1963), American musician and cartoonist

== Fictional characters ==
- Archer, the half brother of Robin in the 2006 television series Robin Hood
- Archer, the leader of the Gorgonites in the 1998 film Small Soldiers

== See also ==
- Archer (disambiguation)
- Archer (surname)
