= Don Maestri =

American college basketball coach (born 1946)

Biographical details
- Born: October 25, 1946 (age 80); New Orleans, Louisiana, U.S.
- Education: University of Southern Mississippi

Coaching career (HC unless noted)
- 1970–1979: Holy Cross HS
- 1979–1980: Mississippi State (asst.)
- 1980–1982: Alabama (asst.)
- 1982–2013: Troy State/Troy
- 2016–2018: Texas A&M (special asst.)

Head coaching record
- Overall: 501–403 (.554)
- Tournaments: 0–1 (NCAA Division I); 8–5 (NCAA Division II); 0–2 (NIT); 0–1 (CBI)

Accomplishments and honors

Championships
- Sun Belt East Division (2010); A-Sun tournament (2003); 3× A-Sun regular season (2000, 2002, 2004); A-Sun South Division (2003); ECC regular season (1994); GSC regular season (1991)

Awards
- Collegeinsider.com Coach of the Year (2009); Sun Belt Coach of the Year (2009); 2× A-Sun Coach of the Year (2000, 2004); Summit League Coach of the Year (1997); ECC Coach of the Year (1994); GSC Coach of the Year (1991)

Donald D. Maestri Jr. (born October 25, 1946) is an American college basketball coach who was the head men's basketball coach at Troy University from 1982 to 2013. Prior to accepting this position, Maestri was an assistant coach at Mississippi State University from 1979 to 1980 and at the University of Alabama from 1980 to 1982. Maestri coached the Trojans to a record of 500–404, one NCAA basketball tournament, five regular season conference titles, and one conference tournament title over the course of 26 seasons at Troy. He has been named coach of the year in the East Coast Conference (1994), the Summit League (1997, then known as the Mid-Continent Conference), Atlantic Sun Conference (2000 and 2004) and the Sun Belt Conference (2009)

Maestri is famous for his run and gun style of basketball, which has led the Trojans to lead Division I NCAA basketball in three-pointers per game three consecutive seasons, from 2003 to 2006. He also coached Troy to a 258–141 win over the DeVry Institute of Atlanta on January 12, 1992, which is the highest scoring basketball game in NCAA history. Under Maestri, the Trojans reached two Division II Final Fours in six years, in 1988 and 1993.

Five different conferences have called Maestri its Coach of the Year, tying him with West Virginia's Bob Huggins for the most among active coaches.

He earned his 500th career win against Florida Atlantic in the Sun Belt Conference tournament in 2013. Maestri retired from the program on March 9, 2013.

== Early life and education ==
Maestri grew up in New Orleans and graduated from De La Salle High School in 1964. After high school, Maestri attended the University of Southern Mississippi in Hattiesburg, Mississippi, where he graduated in 1968 with a double major B.S. in mathematics and physical education. After graduating from Southern Mississippi, Maestri stayed in Hattiesburg to work as a math and physical education teacher at Beeson Academy in the 1968–69 school year.

== Coaching career ==
=== High school and college assistant (1970–1982) ===
Maestri began his coaching career in the fall of 1970 at Holy Cross High School in his hometown of New Orleans. In 10 seasons as coach, he posted a 211–99 record, leading Holy Cross to a state runner-up finish in the top classification in the Louisiana high school ranks in 1974. This 1974 team had a final record of 35–6.

His 1976 team finished with a 32–3 record and was ranked 11th in the nation.

Maestri's teams also finished 1st or 2nd place six times in the Catholic League.

Maestri spent the 1979–80 season as an assistant coach for Jim Hatfield at Mississippi State. During his one year with the program, the Bulldogs finished with a 13–14 record and tied for 6th in the Southeastern Conference.

Maestri spent two seasons at the University of Alabama on Winfrey Sanderson's staff (1980–82). During his time with the Crimson Tide, Alabama participated in the NIT and NCAA tournaments.

Alabama finished 24–7 in 1982, winning the Southeastern Conference Tournament and advancing to the NCAA East Regional.

=== Troy (1982–2013) ===
Maestri was named the head coach of the Troy University basketball team in 1982. When he took over the reins of the Troy basketball program, the Trojans had not posted a winning season in the previous five seasons.

Maestri quickly turned the program into a perennial Division II powerhouse. He led the Trojans to a Gulf South Conference title in the 1990–91 season, where they received an invitation to the NCAA tournament, defeating Florida Southern 78–73 in the 1st Round before falling to North Alabama 86–93 in the 2nd round. He was named Gulf South Coach of the Year for his efforts.

The head coach led Troy State to five NCAA Tournament appearances in 1988, 1990, 1991, 1992 and 1993. Maestri finished with an overall record of 237–131 in Division II.

During the 1987–88 season, the Trojans finished with a 24–10, winning the Gulf South Conference title. Troy State made it to the Elite Eight of the NCAA Tournament before falling 77–72 to Alaska–Anchorage.

Five seasons later, in 1992–93, Maestri helped the Trojans to a 27–5 record and led them to the NCAA Tournament finals, only to fall to Cal State Bakersfield 85–72. Maestri was named Southeast Region Coach of the Year by the NCAA following his team's brilliant season.

During Troy's first season at the Division I level, 1993–94, Maestri's run-and-gun style shot the Trojans to a conference title, going undefeated in the East Coast Conference and winning the conference title. Troy also gained national recognition by leading the nation in three-pointers made per game while averaging 97.6 points per contest. For his efforts, Maestri was named East Coast Conference Coach of the Year.

In 1995, Troy State left the East Coast Conference to join the Mid-Continent Conference (now the Summit League).

During the 1996–97 season, the Trojans were back in contention in the Mid-Continent Conference, upsetting Sweet 16 participant Valparaiso, 72–69, on the road in overtime to cap a 17–10 record. Troy claimed third place in the conference that year, with Maestri earning Coach of the Year honors again.

The Trojans left the Mid-Continent Conference to join the Atlantic Sun Conference in 1998. Maestri's teams struggled mightily their first two seasons in the Atlantic Sun in 1998 and 1999, but quickly turned their fortunes around the next season. In 2000, Maestri brought the Trojans their first conference title in six years and their first Division I conference title. Though the Trojans won the regular season title that year, they did not win the conference tournament, thus keeping them from getting in the NCAA tournament.

Two seasons later, in the 2001–02 season, Maestri was once again able to lead his team to another Atlantic Sun regular season title. Once again though, his Trojans failed to win the conference tournament and were once again left out of the NCAA Tournament.

In the 2002–03, Maestri recorded his best season ever in Division I. He coached his team to a 26–6 record and they won the Atlantic Sun regular season and conference tournament titles. During the season, the team defeated a Southeastern Conference for the first time ever, defeating Arkansas 74–66. The Trojans received their first ever invitation to the NCAA Tournament as a Division I program. They fell to Xavier 59–71 in the 1st round.

The very next season, 2003–04, Maestri once again coached Troy to an Atlantic Sun regular season title for the third consecutive time and finished the season with an 18–2 conference record and a 24–7 record overall. To this day the 18 league victories is the highest single-season total for any Atlantic Sun school. The veteran coach earned A-Sun Coach of the Year honors. Maestri's Trojans received an invitation to the NIT, where they would be defeated in the first round by Niagara, 83–87. The Trojans finished the year second in Division I in scoring at 84.6 points per game, and ninth in scoring margin, winning by an average of 12.0 points per game. Troy also led all of college basketball in three-point field goals made with 346.

In 2005, Troy joined the Sun Belt Conference. Maestri's teams did not finish with a winning record from the 2004–05 season to the 2007–08 season.

Maestri was finally able to coach his team to winning record once again during the 2008–09 season. Troy finished with a 19–13 record and received an invitation to the CBI tournament, where they were defeated by the College of Charleston in the 1st round, 91–93. Maestri was awarded the Sun Belt Coach of the Year and was also named Coach of the Year by highly respected CollegeInsider.com following the successful campaign.

During Maestri's 2009–10 campaign, the Trojans finished with a 20–13 record and recorded the programs first-ever win over in-state opponent Auburn, upsetting the Tigers in Beard–Eaves Coliseum by a score of 81–77. His team went on to win the Sun Belt regular season title and compete in the NIT tournament.

He retired from Troy after the 2013 season, finishing with a 501–403 overall record as head coach at Troy.

=== Later career (2016–2018) ===
Three years after Maestri's retirement from Troy, he joined the Texas A&M Aggies men's basketball staff in 2016 as a special assistant to head coach Billy Kennedy, whom Maestri had mentored since Kennedy was in the eighth grade at Holy Cross High School in Louisiana.

== Head coaching record ==
Record table
Season	Team	Overall	Conference	Standing	Postseason
Troy State Trojans (Gulf South Conference) (1982–1991)
1982–83	Troy State	15–13	7–7	6th	
1983–84	Troy State	18–11	8–6	T–3rd	
1984–85	Troy State	14–13	5–11	T–6th	
1985–86	Troy State	14–13	8–8	T–6th	
1986–87	Troy State	12–14	5–11	9th	
1987–88	Troy State	24–10	10–6	3rd	NCAA Division II Final Four
1988–89	Troy State	19–8	11–5	2nd	
1989–90	Troy State	22–6	11–5	3rd	
1990–91	Troy State	22–8	13–3	1st	NCAA Division II Second Round
Troy State Trojans (NCAA Division II independent) (1991–1993)
1991–92	Troy State	23–6			NCAA Division II First Round
1992–93	Troy State	27–5			NCAA Division II Runner-Up
Troy State Trojans (East Coast Conference) (1993–1994)
1993–94	Troy State	13–14	5–0	1st	
Troy State Trojans (Mid-Continent Conference) (1994–1997)
1994–95	Troy State	11–16	10–8	T–4th	
1995–96	Troy State	11–16	8–10	8th	
1996–97	Troy State	16–11	10–6	4th	
Troy State Trojans (Trans America Athletic Conference/Atlantic Sun Conference) (1997–2005)
1997–98	Troy State	7–20	5–11	5th (West)	
1998–99	Troy State	9–18	6–10	T–7th	
1999–2000	Troy State	17–11	13–5	T–1st	
2000–01	Troy State	19–12	12–6	2nd	
2001–02	Troy State	18–10	14–6	T–1st	
2002–03	Troy State	26–6	14–2	T–1st (South)	NCAA Division I Round of 64
2003–04	Troy State	24–7	18–2	1st	NIT First Round
2004–05	Troy State	12–18	10–10	T–8th	
Troy Trojans (Sun Belt Conference) (2005–2013)
2005–06	Troy	14–15	6–9	T–4th (West)	
2006–07	Troy	13–17	8–10	T–4th (East)	
2007–08	Troy	12–19	4–14	6th (West)	
2008–09	Troy	19–13	14–4	2nd (West)	CBI First Round
2009–10	Troy	20–13	13–5	T–1st (East)	NIT First Round
2010–11	Troy	8–21	6–10	T–4th (East)	
2011–12	Troy	10–18	5–11	T–5th (East)	
2012–13	Troy	12–21	6–14	6th (East)	
Troy State/Troy:		501–403 (.554)	260–215 (.547)		
Total:		501–403 (.554)			
National champion Postseason invitational champion Conference regular season champion Conference regular season and conference tournament champion Division regular season champion Division regular season and conference tournament champion Conference tournament champion
