= John Archer (basketball) =

American basketball player and coach

Current position
- Title: Head coach

Biographical details
- Died: October 13, 1998

Playing career
- Position: Guard

Coaching career (HC unless noted)
- 1956–1973: Troy

Head coaching record
- Overall: 304-185

John Archer (died October 13, 1998) was the head basketball coach of the Troy State Trojans from 1956 to 1973. He was the third coach in the history of the Troy basketball program and accumulated a record of 304–185 in his seventeen seasons as head coach. He guided the program to three NAIA National Tournament appearances and three Alabama Collegiate Conference titles. He came to Troy State Teachers College in 1956 as head basketball and tennis coach, line coach of the football team, and as an instructor in the physical education program. When his coaching days were over, Archer remained on the Troy State staff as a physical education instructor and intramural director.

In 1969, Archer's ability for selecting winners came to national attention when he was named to the U.S. Olympic Men's Basketball Committee. He joined other college basketball experts around the country to select the members of the team, which represented the United States in the 1972 Summer Olympics and the Pan American Games.
