= Jennifer Archer =

American novelist

- Born: Jennifer Browder; 1957 (age 68–69); Cleburne, Texas, U.S.
- Education: West Texas A&M University
- Occupation: Novelist
- Writing career
- Period: 1998–present
- Notable works: What I Left Behind, A Change of Seasons
- Website: www.jenniferarcher.com

Jennifer Archer (born 1957) is an author of young adult fiction or teen fiction, women's fiction and romance novels. She was born in Cleburne, north central Texas.

== Education and career ==
Archer holds a bachelor's degree in business administration from West Texas A&M University, and after graduating she worked in the fields of oil and gas, accounting, real estate management, and the pharmacy and medical equipment industries, before becoming a full-time writer. She is a speaker on the topics of creative writing and pursuing dreams, and has presented talks and workshops for educators, students, writers' organizations and bookstores. Her novels for adults have been published with Dorchester Publishing and Harlequin Books, and her novels for teens with Harper Teen. She is also the co-author of Happiness Rehab: 8 Creative Steps to a More Joyful Life.

== Novels and awards ==
Body and Soul, Archer's debut novel, was released in 1999. Once Upon a Dream, her second novel, spent several weeks on Borders Books' bestseller list for Paranormal Romance, and was chosen by Amazon.com as one of the 'Best New Romances' for the month of January 2001, and was a 2001 P.E.A.R.L. Finalist (Paranormal Excellence Award in Romantic Literature). Archer finished in the finals twice in Romance Writers of America's Golden Heart competition, was a 2006 finalist for the Rita Award with her mainstream women's fiction novel The Me I Used to Be, and her novel Sandwiched was a 2006 nominee for a Romantic Times Bookclub Magazine Reviewer's Choice Award. The Texas Library Association selected her novel Through Her Eyes for the TAYSHAS high school reading list, and for the Spirit of Texas Reading Program - Middle School.

Archer lives in Amarillo, Texas.

== Published works ==
- Body and Soul (1999). New York: Love Spell; Dorchester Pub. ISBN 978-0-505-52334-1 (Wink and a Kiss series)
- Once Upon a Dream (2001). New York: Love Spell; Dorchester Pub. ISBN 978-0-505-52418-8
- Shocking Behavior (2002). New York: Love Spell; Dorchester Pub. ISBN 978-0-505-52507-9
- Sandwiched (2005). Don Mills, Ont., Canada: Harlequin. ISBN 978-0-373-88054-6 (The Next Novel series)
- The Me I Used to Be (2005). Don Mills, Ont., Canada: Harlequin. ISBN 978-0-373-23044-0 (The Next Novel series)
- My Perfectly Imperfect Life (2006). Don Mills, Ont., Canada: Harlequin. ISBN 978-0-373-88084-3 (The Next Novel series)
- Off Her Rocker (2006). Don Mills, Ont.: Harlequin. ISBN 978-0-373-88103-1 (The Next Novel series)
- Annie on the Lam: A Christmas Caper (2007). Don Mills, Ont., Canada: Harlequin. ISBN 978-0-373-88148-2 (The Next Novel series)
- Through Her Eyes (2011). New York: HarperCollins. ISBN 978-0-06-183458-5
- The Shadow Girl (2013). New York: HarperCollins. ISBN 978-0-06-183460-8

=== Omnibus contributions ===
- "Blame It on the Baby" (1999), in Eugenia Riley; Kimberly Raye; Jennifer Archer (eds.) New Year's Babies. New York: Dorchester Pub. Co. ISBN 978-0-505-52345-7
- "Breaking the Rules" (2003), in Katie MacAlister; Jennifer Archer; Sheridon Smythe (eds.) Heat Wave. New York: Dorchester Pub. Co. ISBN 978-0-505-52539-0
- A Mother's Day (2007, with Susan Mallery). Richmond: Mills & Boon. ISBN 978-0-263-85825-9
- "Hannah's Hugs" (2008), in Linda Lael Miller, Sherryl Woods, Curtiss Ann Matlock, Jennifer Archer, Kathleen O'Brien (eds.) More Than Words: Volume 4. New York: Harlequin. ISBN 978-0-373-83622-2
