= Carter Gymnasium =

Arena in Buies Creek, North Carolina, US

Coordinates: 35.510526°N 78.737764°W

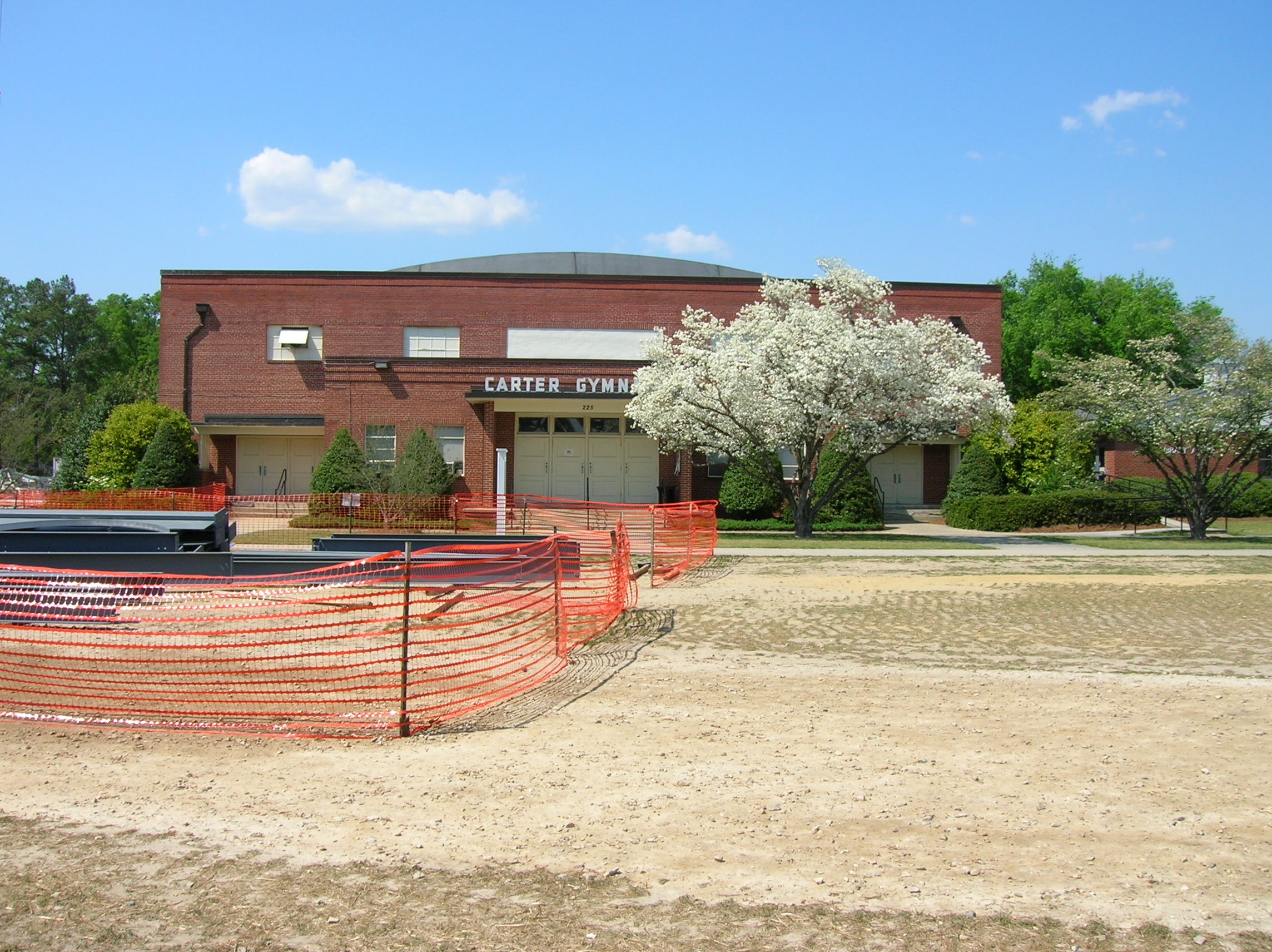
Carter Gymnasium

Carter Gymnasium is a 947-seat multi-purpose arena in Buies Creek, North Carolina. It was previously home to the Campbell University Fighting Camels men's basketball and women's basketball teams. It was one of the smallest college basketball venues in Division I (the G. B. Hodge Center, home to the University of South Carolina Upstate's program, is the current smallest Division I men's basketball arena). The building was named for textile executive Howard Carter. Built in 1952 and opened in 1953, the dimensions of the basketball court are smaller than regulation, but a grandfather clause allowed Campbell University to continue its tenure in the division. The Fighting Camels began play in 2008 in the new John W. Pope, Jr. Convocation Center. The new $30 million arena seats 3,000 spectators for athletic events.

== Notable moments ==
- First men's basketball game: February 25, 1953 loss to Wake Forest College JV, 66–63
- First women's basketball game: February 25, 1953 win over Worth's Business College, 55–50
- First senior college men's basketball game: November 29, 1961, win over Atlantic Christian College, 64–59
- February 29, 1964, Angier High School and Boone Trail High School, two Harnett County, North Carolina high schools, played a 13-overtime contest. Boone Trail won, 56–54, and neither team substituted any players.
- Host venue for 1988 Big South Conference Women's Basketball Tournament
