= Seibert Hall =

Coordinates: 33.4643°N 86.7959°W

Seibert Hall is a 4,240-seat multi-purpose arena in Homewood, Alabama. It was built in 1961. It was home to the Samford University Bulldogs basketball team. The basketball team moved into its new home, the Pete Hanna Center during the 2007–08 season.

One of the distinctive features of Seibert Hall was the wall of windows behind the basketball goal on the South window, overlooking Seibert Stadium, the football facility at Samford.

In April 2023, Samford broke ground on a major $65 million renovation and expansion of Seibert and adjoining buildings to create a new campus recreation, wellness, and athletic complex.
