= Bob Archer =

English footballer

Personal information
- Date of birth: 7 March 1899
- Place of birth: Swindon, England
- Date of death: 1982 (aged 82–83)
- Place of death: Swindon, England
- Position: Left half

Senior career*
Years	Team	Apps	(Gls)
- Bristol Rovers
1920–1931	Swindon Town	189	(4)
- * Club domestic league appearances and goals

Bob Archer (7 March 1899 – 1982) was a football left half back.

Born in Swindon, Archer was the first schoolboy of the town to be awarded an England cap when he played for the team against Wales at Watford in 1913.

In 1916, he lied about his age to be admitted into the Army for the First World War and was later invalided back into civilian life after being gassed.

His professional football career began at Bristol Rovers before he transferred to his home club of Swindon Town in 1920. Archer made his début for the club in March 1921 against Northampton.

It was not until the 1925–26 season that Archer became a first team regular, having been forced to play in various positions in the preceding seasons before deciding to play solely as a left half back. He was ever present in the 1928-29 FA Cup run when Swindon were beaten in the fifth round by Arsenal. He was also a member of the squad that beat Manchester United the following year.

His last appearance for the club was in a 4–0 defeat against Luton Town on 28 February 1931. After retiring, he ran a fish and chip shop and remained in Swindon until his death in 1982.
