= Dale Archer =

American physician

- Born: October 12, 1956 (age 70); New Orleans, Louisiana
- Education: Tulane University
- Occupations: Psychiatrist, television personality
- Notable work: Better Than Normal: How What Makes You Different Makes You Exceptional (pub. 2013), The ADHD Advantage: What You Thought Was a Diagnosis Might Be Your Greatest Strength (pub. 2015)
- Spouse: Angela Diane Corley (m. 1982 - div. 2006)
- Children: 2
- Website: http://drdalearcher.com

Dewey Dale Archer, Jr. (born October 12, 1956) is an American medical doctor, board-certified psychiatrist, and radio and television personality. He hosted Taking Charge with Dr. Dale Archer, and the regional TV and Internet based The Dr. Dale Archer Show. Archer has also appeared on most of the top national news shows as a psychiatric expert.

Archer was named a Distinguished Fellow of the American Psychiatric Association in 2005. He is also the founder/CEO of The Institute for Neuropsychiatry in Lake Charles, Louisiana, and the founder and medical director for psychiatric services at Lake Charles Memorial Hospital(LCMH).

== Early life ==
Dewy Dale Archer, Jr. was born in New Orleans Louisiana, and moved to Lake Charles at the age of 4. His father Dewey Dale Archer Sr. (born 1923), was an Ophthalmologist whose parents lived outside of Knoxville Tennessee. His mother, Valerie Archer (née Grode; born 1930) is a native of New Orleans who can trace her lineage to Jean Lafitte. Archer has one sister, Lee Ann Archer, who received her undergraduate degree at Rice University, and attended Tulane Law School.

== Education ==
Archer attended Tulane University in New Orleans, Louisiana. He was named a Tulane Scholar in 1977, received Phi Beta Kappa honors in 1978, and received his Bachelor of Arts degree in Philosophy with honors in 1978. He continued at Tulane University School of Medicine, where he received his M.D. in 1983. Archer completed his internship in Internal Medicine and his Residency in Psychiatry at The University of Texas in 1987.

== Career ==
In 1987, Archer founded The Institute for Neuropsychiatry in Lake Charles, Louisiana. He also worked as a prison psychiatrist from 1988 - 1995 at Phelps Correctional Institute, a medium security prison in DeQuincy Louisiana. He was an expert witness in sanity and competency criminal court cases from 1987 - 1995. In 1987, he founded the psychiatric program for Lake Charles Memorial Hospital in 1988, where he remains the Psychiatric Medical Director today.

In 1990 Archer started a weekly mental illness news segment at the Lake Charles NBC affiliate KPLCTV. He also hosted the call-in radio show Taking Charge With Dr. Dale Archer and a regional Internet TV talk show, The Dr. Dale Archer Show. He was a regular guest on Issues w Jane Velez Mitchell and Dr. Drew on Call. Archer was a regular guest on Fox News, The Strategy Room, and has appeared regularly on other national news shows, talking about psychological issues.

=== Writing ===
Archer contributed blog articles at Foxnews.com from 2009 - 2013, and at Forbes from 2013 - 2015. He currently contributes regularly to his blog Reading Between the (Head)Lines at Psychology Today, a blog about current events from a psychological perspective, which he started in 2013. He has authored medical articles, as well as the patient information booklet Chemical Imbalance Depression, published in 1989.

Archer wrote the New York Times bestselling book Better Than Normal: How What Makes You Different Can Make You Exceptional published in 2013, and The ADHD Advantage: What You Thought Was a Diagnosis May Be Your Greatest Strength, published in 2015.

== Honors ==
- Tulane Scholar, 1977
- Phi Beta Kappa, 1978
- Bachelor of Arts with Honors, 1978
- Distinguished Fellow of the American Psychiatric Association, 2005

== Personal life ==
Archer married Angela Diane Corley in 1982. They divorced in 2006. He has a daughter Adrianna (born in 1983). She is married to Andrew Ross, an investment banker with Morgan Stanley. They currently live in Hong Kong. Archer also has a son D. Dale Archer III (Trey) (born in 1985), who is a financial planner with Infinity Solutions, currently working on his MBA at Hult University in Shanghai, China.

Archer is a tournament poker player who finished 11th in the world at the World Series of Poker Main Event in 2004. He also enjoys kayaking, cooking, and wine.
