= Troy Trojans men's basketball =

| 2026–27 Troy Trojans men's basketball team |
- University: Troy University
- First season: 1950–51; 76 years ago
- Head coach: Adam Howard (1st season)
- Location: Troy, Alabama
- Arena: Trojan Arena (capacity: 6,000)
- Conference: Sun Belt Conference
- Nickname: Trojans
- Colors: Cardinal, silver, and black
- Student section: The Fortress
- All-time record: 1,170–966 (.548)

NCAA Division I tournament appearances
- 2003, 2017, 2025, 2026

NAIA tournament appearances
- 1957, 1958, 1959

Conference tournament champions
- 1966, 2003, 2017, 2025, 2026

Conference regular-season champions
- 1961, 1962, 1964, 1977, 1991, 1994, 2000, 2002, 2003, 2004, 2010, 2025, 2026

Conference division champions
- 2003, 2010

Uniforms
| Home | Away | Alternate |

The Troy Trojans men's basketball program is the intercollegiate men's basketball of Troy University. The program is classified in NCAA Division I and the team competes in the Sun Belt Conference. The team currently plays their home games in Trojan Arena, which was built in 2012 and replaced the old arena known as Sartain Hall. Troy has appeared four times in the NCAA Division I men's basketball tournament, most recently in 2026.

== History ==
Troy's first season was in 1950 under then head coach Buddy Brooks.

The Trojans appeared in the 2003 NCAA Division I men's basketball tournament as a 14-seed after winning the Atlantic Sun Conference tournament and faced 3-seeded Xavier in the first round, losing 71–59. The Trojans were the champions of the Atlantic Sun Conference in 2003 and defeated Central Florida for the conference tournament championship in Atlanta, Georgia.

In 2004, the Trojans were the Atlantic Sun Conference regular-season champions. They reached the Atlantic Sun tournament championship game, only to lose a heart-breaker in the last minute to UCF, 60–55. As regular-season champions, Troy earned an automatic bid to the NIT, where they would face Niagara in Buffalo, New York. Troy would lose to Niagara in the first round, 87–83. They finished with a 24–7 overall record. Following the season, Troy moved to the Sun Belt Conference for all sports.

From 2005 to 2008, Troy struggled to find the success that they had enjoyed in the Atlantic Sun Conference. Their new home in the Sun Belt Conference proved to be a challenge, with Troy going 51–69 over a stretch of four seasons.

In 2009, after finishing in third place in the Sun Belt Conference, the Trojans would make their first post-season appearance since 2004, in the first annual CBI Tournament, where they would host the College of Charleston, only to lose in a thriller, 93–91. They would finish the season with a 19–13 record.

In 2010, Troy won their first ever Sun Belt regular-season title and made it to the Finals of Sun Belt Conference tournament before losing in the last 30 seconds to North Texas, 66–63. The Trojans received an invite to the NIT, where they would fall to Ole Miss in the first round, 84–65. The Trojans finished the 2010 season with a 20–13 (13–5) record, with big wins over in-state rival Auburn and Valparaiso.

In the inaugural game at the newly built Trojan Arena during the 2012 season, Troy had a record crowd of 5,120 as they hosted Mississippi State, who were coming off of a 20-win season and an NIT appearance. Troy would upset the Bulldogs, 56–53.

In 2017, under head coach Phil Cunningham, Troy made their way back to the NCAA tournament by winning the Sun Belt Conference tournament, defeating Texas State, 59–53. The team earned a 15 seed, playing no. 2 seed Duke in the first round. Duke defeated Troy, 87–65. Troy finished the season with a 22–15 record.

The Trojan basketball team is recognized in recent Division I history for leading the nation in three-pointers for seven different seasons (1992, 1994, 1995, 1996, 2004, 2005, and 2006), making 1,068 three-pointers over the course of 89 games (11.66 per game) during those three seasons.

Before Troy's accession to Division I, Troy was one of the most successful basketball teams in Division II. In 1988, the team made it to the Elite Eight of the Division II tournament before falling to Alaska-Anchorage, 77–72. Five years later, the team advanced all the way to the Division II national championship game against Cal State Bakersfield, only to finish as runner-up, falling to the Roadrunners, 85–72.

One of Troy's claims to fame, however, is their game against DeVry (when DeVry had athletics) on January 12, 1992, when the Trojans came out victorious by the NCAA-record score of 253–141. This game is currently the highest-scoring game in NCAA basketball history.

=== "Trey State" moniker ===
Under head coach Don Maestri, Troy State led the nation in three-point shots attempted and three-point shots made for many years during the program's time in NCAA Division II. Maestri's run-and-gun style of play was very effective, even after Troy State transitioned to Division I. Because of this style of play, Troy State amassed 141 games where they scored 100 or more points, with a record of 122–19 when scoring more than 100 points during Maestri's tenure as head coach from 1982 to 2013.

When Troy State began their first season in Division I in 1994, the program came in with a bang, ranking no. 2 in the nation in three-pointers attempted and no. 5 in the nation in three-pointers made. Maestri and his Trojan teams never looked back from there. From 1994 to 2006, the Trojans finished no. 1 in the nation four times in three-pointers attempted and three-pointers made. Troy State also placed in the top five nationally of those same statistical categories eight times from 1994 to 2008. This led some newspaper and media outlets to give the basketball program the moniker "Trey State."

Troy currently holds the all-time NCAA record across all divisions for three-pointers attempted in a season, shooting 1,303 three-pointers during the 1991–92 season.

=== Highest scoring game in NCAA history ===
On January 12, 1992, Troy State shattered a plethora of records during a match-up against the DeVry University Hoyas of the NAIA. The Trojans sported a 12–3 record while the DeVry Hoyas had a 3–15 record. After tip-off, Troy State scored their first basket after 54 seconds. The Trojans only had 15 points after the first three minutes. As the game settled into its soon-to-be record breaking groove, points came steadily; with 3:14 remaining in the first half, Troy eclipsed the 100-point mark.

Within the first three minutes of the second half, the Trojans scored 26 points and had already accumulated 149 overall with 17 minutes remaining. It was not until 6:35 into the second half that Troy State scored their first points of the half that were not three-pointers or dunks. With 10 minutes remaining, Chris Greasham's three-pointer gave Troy 189, eclipsing the previous NCAA single game scoring record of 187. Then, with 7:53 to go, Troy State surpassed the 200-point mark, becoming the first (and only) team in college basketball history to do so. The scoreboard in Troy's arena was not built to display 200+ points, and so when the moment occurred, it did not display the numbers correctly (their solution was to start over at zero and work their way back up from there). During the second half alone, the Trojans scored 135 points, besting their minutes-old record of 123, and the 30 three-pointers in the second stanza broke the NCAA all-time game record of 25 (set previously by Troy). Their 51 made three-point field goals more than doubled that record, and the 109 three-point attempts record has never been seriously contested.

When the final buzzer sounded, Troy State had won the game by a record-breaking score of 258–141. The score of the game quickly made national headlines across the United States, from The Seattle Times to the Miami Herald, and even in other countries.

The game between Troy State and DeVry remains the highest single scoring game in NCAA history. Seven statisticians worked for 57 minutes after the game ended to complete its box score. Among records considered unbreakable are total points between teams (399), points by one team in one half (135), and three-pointers made and attempted (51/109) by one team in a single game. That season, Troy State compiled a 23–6 overall record while setting many school records along the way, including single season scoring average (121.0), field goals made and attempted (1,274/2,839), three-pointers made and attempted (444/1,303), and steals (460). They also set single game records of points (258), points in a half (135), field goals made and attempted (102/190), rebounds (94), assists (65), and total points between teams.

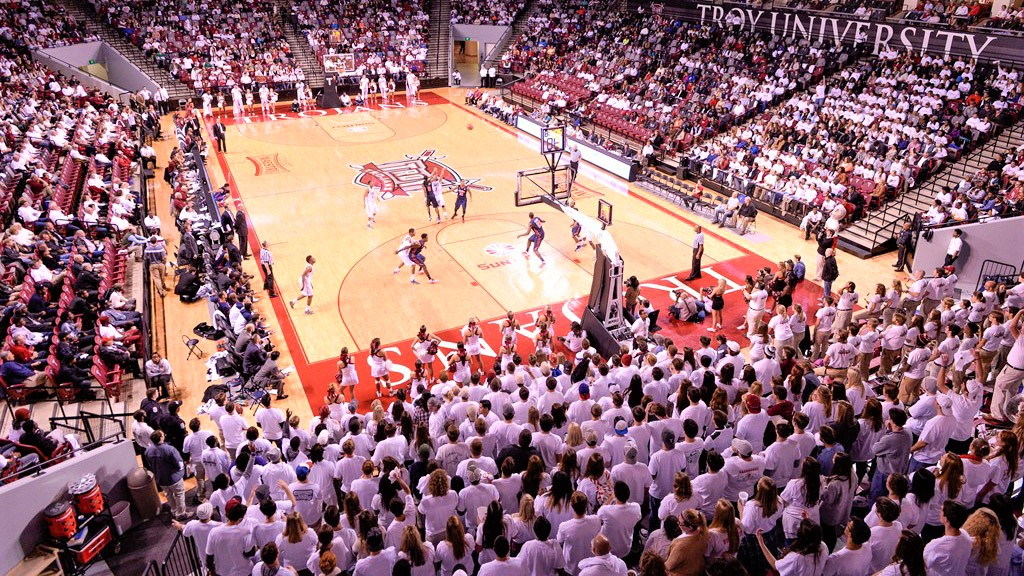
Trojan Arena during a "whiteout" game against South Alabama.

== Conference titles ==
Troy has won a total of 14 combined conference regular season and tournament titles. Troy's most successful stretch of conference titles came while being a member of the Atlantic Sun Conference, winning the regular season titles four out of five seasons from 2000 to 2004.

| Conference | Year | Title | Record | Coach |
| Alabama Collegiate Conference | 1960–1961 | Conference | 22–6 (9–1) | John Archer |
| Alabama Collegiate Conference | 1961–1962 | Conference | 25–6 (8–4) | John Archer |
| Alabama Collegiate Conference | 1963–1964 | Conference | 22–8 (7–3) | John Archer |
| Alabama Collegiate Conference | 1965–1966 | Tournament | 24–9 (5–6) | John Archer |
| Gulf South Conference | 1976–1977 | Conference | 15–14 (11–5) | Wes Bizilia |
| Gulf South Conference | 1990–1991 | Conference | 22–8 (13–3) | Don Maestri |
| East Coast Conference | 1993–1994 | Conference | 13–14 (5–0) | Don Maestri |
| Atlantic Sun Conference | 1999–2000 | Conference | 17–11 (13–5) | Don Maestri |
| Atlantic Sun Conference | 2001–2002 | Conference | 18–10 (14–6) | Don Maestri |
| Atlantic Sun Conference | 2002–2003 | Conference | 26–6 (14–2) | Don Maestri |
| Atlantic Sun Conference | 2002–2003 | Tournament | 26–6 (14–2) | Don Maestri |
| Atlantic Sun Conference | 2003–2004 | Conference | 24–7 (18–2) | Don Maestri |
| Sun Belt Conference | 2009–2010 | Conference | 20–13 (13–5) | Don Maestri |
| Sun Belt Conference | 2016–2017 | Tournament | 22–15 (10–8) | Phil Cunningham |
| Sun Belt Conference | 2024–2025 | Conference | 23–11 (13–5) | Scott Cross |
| Sun Belt Conference | 2024–2025 | Tournament | 23–11 (13–5) | Scott Cross |
| Sun Belt Conference | 2025–2026 | Conference | 20–11 (12–6) | Scott Cross |

== Coaches ==
| Years | Coach | Record |
|---|---|---|
| 1950–1951 | Buddy Brooks | 3–15 |
| 1951–1956 | Leonard Serfustini | 75–52 |
| 1956–1973 | John Archer | 302–186 |
| 1973–1982 | Wes Bizilia | 103–128 |
| 1982–2013 | Don Maestri | 501–403 |
| 2013–2019 | Phil Cunningham | 80–111 |
| 2019–2026 | Scott Cross | 125–99 |
| 2026–Present | Adam Howard | 0–0 |

== All-Americans ==
- Paul Word (Small College All-American) – 1962
- Darryl Thomas (NABC Third Team All-American) – 1989
- Anthony Reed (NCAA Division II First Team All-American) – 1990
- Terry McCord (NABC First Team All-American) – 1993
- Greg Davis (ESPN All-America Team, AP Honorable Mention) – 2004
- O'Darien Bassett (Collegeinsider.com Mid-Major All-America Team) – 2008

== Facilities ==
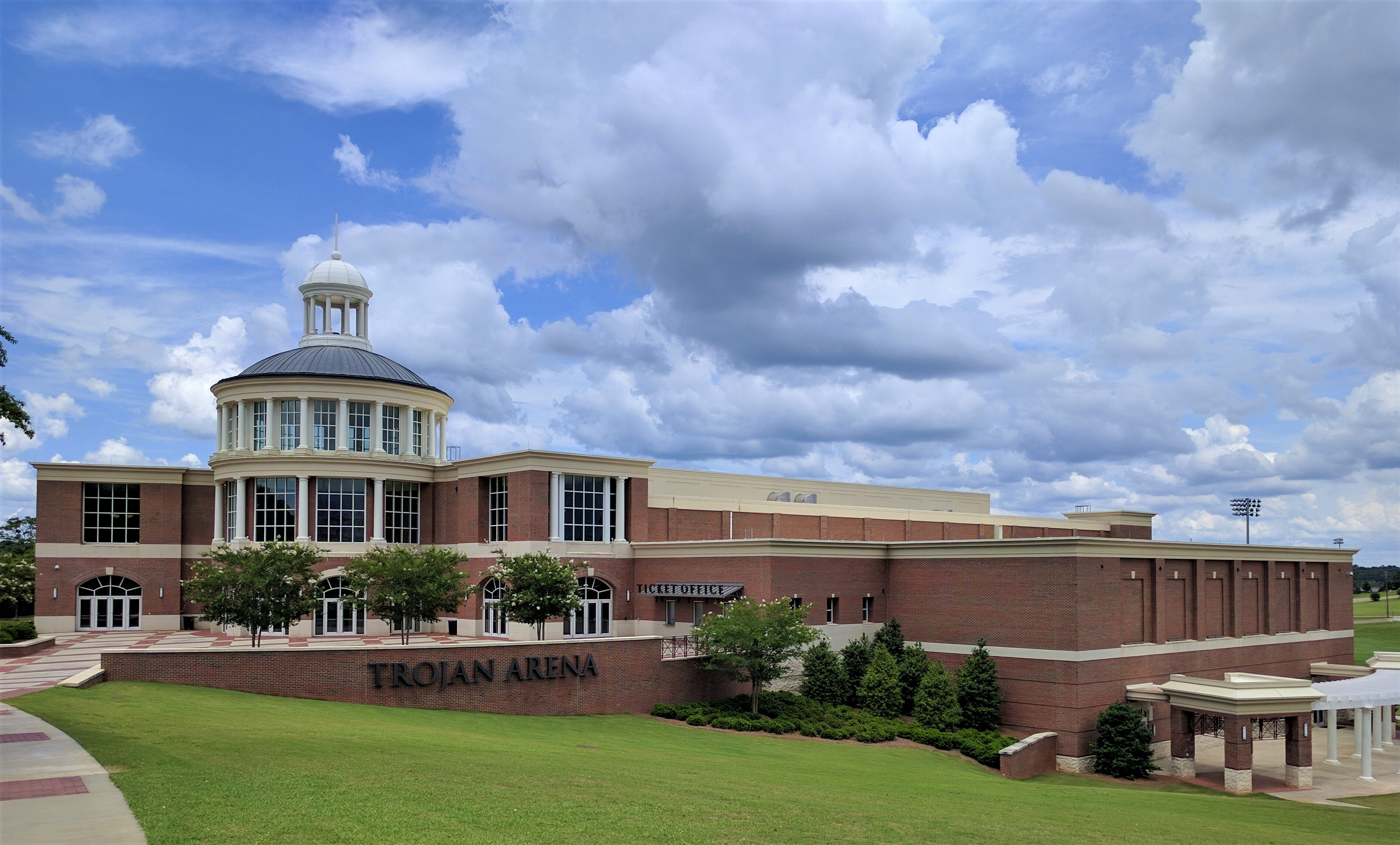
View of Trojan Arena from the main rotunda entrance.

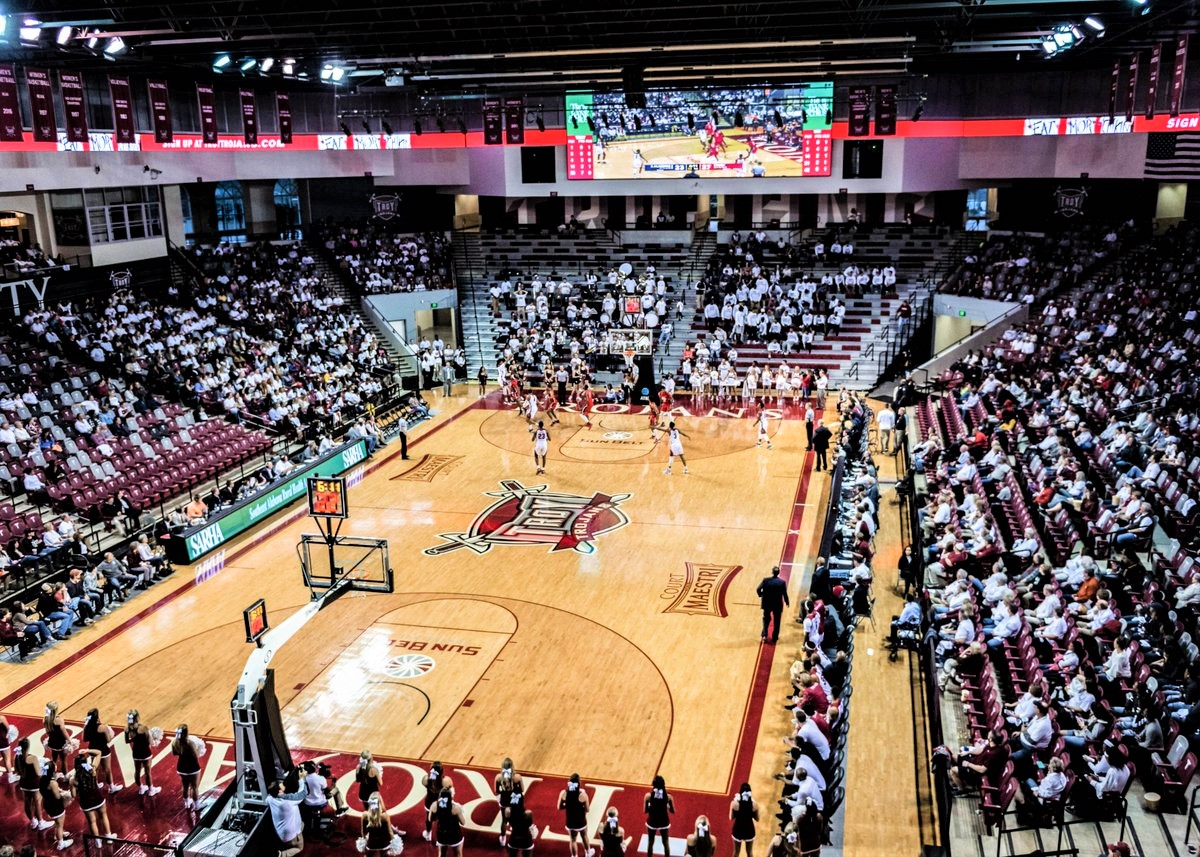
View on the main court in Trojan Arena.

=== Sartain Hall (1962–2012) ===
Sartain Hall is a 4,000-seat multi-purpose arena in Troy, Alabama. It was home to the Troy University Trojans basketball team until Trojan Arena opened in 2012. It opened in 1962.

The building was built as a new Physical Education Building in 1962, with its major facility being a 2,500-seat basketball gymnasium which was ready for the first basketball game that fall.

Before Sartain Hall, the university never previously had an adequate gymnasium, and the college administration had the foresight at the time to make it available for high school basketball tournaments as well as college games and tournaments. The building is named in honor of the late Professor Auxford Sartain.

In 2012, Sartain Hall was no longer used for basketball activities since the newly built Trojan Arena had opened. It was used as a multi-purpose student recreation facility until its demolition in 2018.

=== Trojan Arena (2012–present) ===
Trojan Arena is a 6,000-seat arena that is home to the Troy men's and women's basketball, volleyball and track programs. The arena is also used for the university's commencement ceremonies and special events. Trojan Arena replaces the university's longtime basketball and events facility, Sartain Hall, which opened in 1962.

The facility was constructed with architectural direction by Goodwyn, Mills and Cawood and design support by venue specialists Populous, noted for its designs of such sporting venues as Yankee Stadium in New York City, the main stadium for the 2012 London Olympic Games and Nanjing Sports Park in China.

Trojan Arena seating features 5,200 chair-back seats, seven upper-level suites and an exclusive Stadium Club area for donors, while also having floor seating for students. The arena features an LED ribbon board that circles around the entire arena, one of only two of its kind in the Sun Belt Conference. Daktronics designed, manufactured, and installed two 767-square-foot LED video/scoring system boards, the largest end-wall boards produced by Daktronics for an indoor college facility.

Under the main playing court sits a 10,000 sq ft area of basketball practice courts. These facilities are shared by both the men's and women's basketball teams, as well as the indoor women's volley team.

Among the other features of the new arena are a three-tiered rotunda at the main entrance, an interior concourse with concession stands and a food court-styled dining center with specialty food items.

== Postseason results ==
Troy currently possesses an all-time record of 11–14 in postseason tournaments.

=== NCAA Division I Tournament results ===
The Trojans have appeared in the NCAA Division I Tournament four times. Their combined record is 0–4.

| Year | Round | Opponent | Result |
|---|---|---|---|
| 2003 | First Round | Xavier | L 59–71 |
| 2017 | First Round | Duke | L 65–87 |
| 2025 | First Round | Kentucky | L 57–75 |
| 2026 | First Round | Nebraska | L 47–76 |

=== NIT results ===
The Trojans have appeared in the National Invitation Tournament (NIT) two times. Their combined record is 0–2.

| Year | Round | Opponent | Result |
|---|---|---|---|
| 2004 | First Round | Niagara | L 83–87 |
| 2010 | First Round | Mississippi | L 65–84 |

=== CBI results ===
The Trojans have appeared in the College Basketball Invitational (CBI) two times. Their record is 0–2.

| Year | Round | Opponent | Result |
|---|---|---|---|
| 2009 | First Round | Charleston | L 91–93 |
| 2022 | First Round | Abilene Christian | L 70–82 |

=== NCAA Division II Tournament results ===
The Trojans have appeared in the NCAA Division II Tournament five times. Their combined record is 10–6.

| Year | Round | Opponent | Result |
|---|---|---|---|
| 1976 | First Round; Second Round | Jacksonville State; UAH | W 88–85; L 69–74 |
| 1977 | First Round; Second Round | Lincoln; North Alabama | W 81–75; L 70–77 |
| 1988 | First Round; Second Round; Sweet Sixteen; Elite Eight; Consolation round | Virginia Union; NC Central; Gannon; Alaska-Anchorage; Florida Southern | W 75–71; W 66–65; W 100–79; L 72–77; L 84–94 |
| 1991 | First Round; Second Round | Florida Southern; North Alabama | W 78–73; L 86–93 |
| 1992 | First Round; Consolation round | Jacksonville State; Rollins | L 91–96; W 110–92 |
| 1993 | Second Round; Sweet Sixteen; Elite Eight; Final Four; Championship Game | Florida Southern; Delta State; Washburn; Southern New Hampshire; Cal State-Bakersfield | W 75–72; W 110–93; W 94–82; W 126–123; L 72–85 |

=== NAIA Tournament results ===
The Trojans have appeared in the NAIA Tournament three times. Their combined record is 0–3.

| Year | Round | Opponent | Result |
|---|---|---|---|
| 1957 | First Round | Ball State | L 70–98 |
| 1958 | First Round | Indiana State (Pa.) | L 73–90 |
| 1959 | First Round | Illinois State | L 50–98 |

== Yearly results ==
Record table
| Season | Coach | Overall | Conference | Standing | Postseason |
|---|---|---|---|---|---|
Troy State (NAIA Independent) (1950–1960)
| 1950–1951 | Buddy Brooks | 3–15 | | | — |
| Buddy Brooks: | | 3–15 | | | |
| 1951–1952 | Leonard Serfustini | 5–20 | | | — |
| 1952–1953 | Leonard Serfustini | 18–7 | | | NAIA District |
| 1953–1954 | Leonard Serfustini | 22–6 | | | NAIA District |
| 1954–1955 | Leonard Serfustini | 12–10 | | | — |
| 1955–1956 | Leonard Serfustini | 18–9 | | | NAIA District |
| Leonard Serfustini: | | 75–52 | | | |
| 1956–1957 | John Archer | 19–8 | | | NAIA First Round |
| 1957–1958 | John Archer | 19–6 | | | NAIA First Round |
| 1958–1959 | John Archer | 19–11 | | | NAIA First Round |
| 1959–1960 | John Archer | 18–9 | | | NAIA District |
Troy State (Alabama Collegiate Conference) (1960–1971)
| 1960–1961 | John Archer | 22–6 | 9–1 | | NAIA District |
| 1961–1962 | John Archer | 25–6 | 8–4 | | NAIA District |
| 1962–1963 | John Archer | 20–10 | 7–3 | | — |
| 1963–1964 | John Archer | 22–8 | 7–3 | 1st | NAIA District |
| 1964–1965 | John Archer | 22–8 | 8–4 | | NAIA District |
| 1965–1966 | John Archer | 24–9 | 5–6 | | — |
| 1966–1967 | John Archer | 26–7 | 8–4 | | — |
| 1967–1968 | John Archer | 18–8 | 8–4 | | — |
| 1968–1969 | John Archer | 10–18 | 1–10 | | — |
| 1969–1970 | John Archer | 8–20 | 1–11 | | |
| 1970–1971 | John Archer | 11–17 | 6–6 | | |
Troy State (Gulf South Conference) (1971–1991)
| 1971–1972 | John Archer | 14–15 | 4–6 | | — |
| 1972–1973 | John Archer | 5–20 | 3–11 | 8th | — |
| 1973–1974 | John Archer | 9–16 | 6–7 | T-6th | — |
| John Archer: | | 302–186 | 85–86 | | |
| 1974–1975 | Wes Bizilia | 18–8 | 8–5 | 3rd | — |
| 1975–1976 | Wes Bizilia | 16–10 | 8–5 | T-4th | NCAA Second Round |
| 1976–1977 | Wes Bizilia | 15–14 | 11–5 | T-1st | NCAA Second Round |
| 1977–1978 | Wes Bizilia | 1–23 | 1–13 | 9th | — |
| 1978–1979 | Wes Bizilia | 10–16 | 7–9 | T-5th | — |
| 1979–1980 | Wes Bizilia | 10–15 | 4–8 | T-5th | — |
| 1980–1981 | Wes Bizilia | 13–13 | 3–9 | 7th | — |
| 1981–1982 | Wes Bizilia | 11–13 | 3–9 | 6th | — |
| Wes Bizilia: | | 94–112 | 45–63 | | |
| 1982–1983 | Don Maestri | 15–13 | 7–7 | T-4th | — |
| 1983–1984 | Don Maestri | 18–11 | 8–6 | T-3rd | — |
| 1984–1985 | Don Maestri | 14–13 | 5–11 | T-6th | — |
| 1985–1986 | Don Maestri | 14–13 | 8–8 | T-6th | — |
| 1986–1987 | Don Maestri | 12–14 | 5–11 | 9th | — |
| 1987–1988 | Don Maestri | 24–10 | 10–6 | 3rd | NCAA Elite Eight |
| 1988–1989 | Don Maestri | 19–8 | 11–5 | 2nd | — |
| 1989–1990 | Don Maestri | 22–6 | 11–5 | 3rd | — |
| 1990–1991 | Don Maestri | 22–8 | 13–3 | 1st | NCAA Second Round |
Troy State (Division II Independent) (1991–1993)
| 1991–1992 | Don Maestri | 23–6 | | | NCAA First Round |
| 1992–1993 | Don Maestri | 27–5 | | | NCAA Finals |
Troy State (East Coast Conference) (1993–1994)
| 1993–1994 | Don Maestri | 13–14 | 5–0 | 1st | — |
Troy State (Mid-Continent Conference) (1994–1997)
| 1994–1995 | Don Maestri | 11–16 | 10–8 | T-4th | — |
| 1995–1996 | Don Maestri | 11–16 | 8–10 | 8th | — |
| 1996–1997 | Don Maestri | 16–11 | 10–6 | 4th | — |
Troy State (Atlantic Sun Conference) (1997–2005)
| 1997–1998 | Don Maestri | 7–20 | 5–11 | 5th (West) | — |
| 1998–1999 | Don Maestri | 9–18 | 6–10 | T-7th | — |
| 1999–2000 | Don Maestri | 17–11 | 13–5 | T-1st | — |
| 2000–2001 | Don Maestri | 19–12 | 12–6 | 2nd | — |
| 2001–2002 | Don Maestri | 18–10 | 14–6 | T-1st | — |
| 2002–2003 | Don Maestri | 26–6 | 14–2 | T-1st (South) | NCAA First Round |
| 2003–2004 | Don Maestri | 24–7 | 18–2 | 1st | NIT First Round |
| 2004–2005 | Don Maestri | 12–18 | 10–10 | T-8th | — |
Troy (Sun Belt Conference) (2005–Present)
| 2005–2006 | Don Maestri | 14–15 | 6–9 | T-4th (West) | — |
| 2006–2007 | Don Maestri | 13–17 | 8–10 | T-4th (East) | — |
| 2007–2008 | Don Maestri | 12–19 | 4–14 | 6th (East) | — |
| 2008–2009 | Don Maestri | 19–13 | 14–4 | 2nd (East) | CBI First Round |
| 2009–2010 | Don Maestri | 20–13 | 13–5 | T-1st (East) | NIT First Round |
| 2010–2011 | Don Maestri | 8–21 | 6–10 | T-4th (East) | |
| 2011–2012 | Don Maestri | 10–18 | 5–11 | T-5th (East) | |
| 2012–2013 | Don Maestri | 12–21 | 6–14 | 6th (East) | |
| Don Maestri: | | 501–403 | 265–215 | | |
| 2013–2014 | Phil Cunningham | 11–20 | 6–12 | 8th | |
| 2014–2015 | Phil Cunningham | 10–19 | 5–15 | 11th | |
| 2015–2016 | Phil Cunningham | 9–22 | 4–16 | 11th | |
| 2016–2017 | Phil Cunningham | 22–15 | 10–8 | T-6th | NCAA First Round |
| 2017–2018 | Phil Cunningham | 16–17 | 9–9 | T-5th | |
| 2018–2019 | Phil Cunningham | 12–18 | 5–13 | T–12th | |
| Phil Cunningham: | | 80–111 | 34–61 | | |
| 2019–2020 | Scott Cross | 9–22 | 5–15 | T–11th | |
| 2020–2021 | Scott Cross | 11–17 | 4–12 | 6th (East) | |
| 2021–2022 | Scott Cross | 20–12 | 10–6 | 4th | CBI First Round |
| 2022–2023 | Scott Cross | 20–13 | 11–7 | T-5th | |
| 2023–2024 | Scott Cross | 20–12 | 13–5 | 3rd | |
| 2024–2025 | Scott Cross | 23–11 | 13–5 | T-1st | NCAA First Round |
| 2025–2026 | Scott Cross | 22–11 | 12–6 | 1st | NCAA First Round |
| Scott Cross: | | 105–87 | 56–50 | | |
| Total: | | 1,170–966 | | | |
National champion Postseason invitational champion Conference regular season champion Conference regular season and conference tournament champion Division regular season champion Division regular season and conference tournament champion Conference tournament champion

== Final rankings ==
| Year | Record | NCAA Poll |
|---|---|---|
| 1992 | 23–6 | #14 |
| 1993 | 27–5 | #4 |

== Rivalries ==
=== Troy vs. South Alabama ===
Currently, one of Troy's biggest rivals in basketball is with in-state foe South Alabama. The Jaguars currently hold an 11–23 advantage in the all-time series over the Trojans.

=== Troy vs. Georgia State ===
Troy and Georgia State have met off and on since 1952. They began to play each other regularly when both programs were members of the Atlantic Sun Conference in the late 1990s, and again when Georgia State joined the Sun Belt Conference in 2013. Both programs have ties because of Charles "Lefty" Driesell, who was head coach of Georgia State from 1997 to 2003. Troy's former head coach, Phil Cunningham, was an assistant under Driesell during his time at Georgia State and James Madison. One of Driesell's grandsons, Michael Moynihan, was also a member of the Troy coaching staff under Phil Cunnungham for a few years.

Troy currently holds a 27–22 edge in the all-time series over the Panthers.

=== Troy vs. UCF ===
Now a dormant rivalry, Troy and UCF were once conference rivals and were considered the prominent rivalry during both school's tenure in the Atlantic Sun Conference. Both basketball programs routinely fought for the conference regular season and tournament titles before they both left the Atlantic Sun Conference in 2005. Troy currently leads the series with a 12–8 record.
