= Georgia State Panthers men's basketball statistical leaders =

The Georgia State Panthers men's basketball statistical leaders are individual statistical leaders of the Georgia State Panthers men's basketball program in various categories, including points, rebounds, assists, steals, and blocks. Within those areas, the lists identify single-game, single-season, and career leaders. The Panthers represent Georgia State University in the NCAA's Sun Belt Conference.

Georgia State began competing in intercollegiate basketball in 1963. The NCAA did not officially record assists as a stat until the 1983–84 season, and blocks and steals until the 1985–86 season, but Green Bay's record books includes players in these stats before these seasons. These lists are updated through the end of the 2020–21 season.

== Scoring ==
Career
Rank	Player	Points	Seasons
1	R.J. Hunter	1,819	2012–13 2013–14 2014–15
2	D'Marcus Simonds	1,755	2016–17 2017–18 2018–19
3	Kane Williams	1,589	2017–18 2018–19 2019–20 2020–21 2021–22
4	Rodney Hamilton	1,515	1994–95 1995–96 1996–97 1997–98
5	Terrence Brandon	1,479	1991–92 1993–94 1994–95 1995–96
6	Devonta White	1,393	2010–11 2011–12 2012–13 2013–14
7	Chavelo Holmes	1,375	1981–82 1982–83 1983–84 1985–86
8	James Andrews	1,279	1985–86 1987–88 1988–89
9	Phillip Luckydo	1,254	1990–91 1991–92
10	Leonard Mendez	1,238	2005–06 2006–07 2007–08 2008–09

Season
Rank	Player	Points	Season
1	D'Marcus Simonds	742	2017–18
2	R.J. Hunter	688	2014–15
3	Thomas Terrell	635	2001–02
4	Phillip Luckydo	629	1991–92
5	D'Marcus Simonds	625	2018–19
	Phillip Luckydo	625	1990–91
7	R.J. Hunter	604	2013–14
	Ryan Harrow	604	2013–14
9	Shernard Long	593	2000–01
10	Chris Collier	565	1990–91

Single game
Rank	Player	Points	Season	Opponent
1	Chris Collier	49	1990–91	Butler
2	Thomas Terrell	42	2000–01	Jacksonville
	George Pendleton	42	1970–71	Jacksonville
4	R.J. Hunter	41	2013–14	UTSA
	Bob Pierson	41	1975–76	Georgia Southern
	Jackie Poag	41	1971–72	Chattanooga
7	D'Marcus Simonds	39	2017–18	UL Monroe
	Terrence Brandon	39	1993–94	Southeastern Louisiana
9	Devin Mitchell	38	2017–18	Little Rock
	R.J. Hunter	38	2012–13	Old Dominion
	Anton Reese	38	1998–99	Kansas State
	Matt O’Brien	38	1989–90	Stetson
	Chavelo Holmes	38	1983–84	Florida A&M
	Jerome Scott	38	1977–78	South Florida
	Jelani Hamilton	38	2025–26	Arkansas State

== Rebounds ==
Career
Rank	Player	Rebounds	Seasons
1	Terrence Brandon	750	1991–92 1993–94 1994–95 1995–96
2	Zavian Smith	714	1989–90 1990–91 1991–92 1993–94
3	Rashad Chase	707	2005–06 2006–07 2007–08 2008–09
4	Travis Williams	634	1992–93 1993–94 1994–95 1995–96
5	Mike Nalls	616	1989–90 1990–91 1991–92 1992–93
6	Markus Crider	587	2012–13 2013–14 2014–15 2015–16
7	Chris Collier	586	1989–90 1990–91
8	Keven Davis	583	1985–86 1986–87 1987–88 1988–89
9	Nate Williams	540	2001–02 2002–03 2003–04
10	Rodney Turner	527	1986–87 1988–89

Season
Rank	Player	Rebounds	Season
1	Chris Collier	328	1990–91
2	Nick McMullen	315	2024–25
3	Neil Purvis	288	1972–73
4	Rodney Turner	278	1988–89
5	Bob Pierson	265	1975–76
6	Jay'Den Turner	264	2023–24
7	Chris Collier	258	1989–90
8	Thomas Terrell	255	2000–01
9	Terrence Brandon	249	1995–96
	Rodney Turner	249	1986–87

Single game
Rank	Player	Rebounds	Season	Opponent
1	Ron Ricketts	28	1971–72	Baptist
2	Chris Collier	23	1989–90	Centenary
3	Bob Pierson	21	1975–76	Georgia Southern
	Terrence Brandon	21	1994–95	Centenary
5	Rodney Turner	20	1988–89	Centenary
	Eliel Nsoseme	20	2020–21	Mercer
7	Elfrem Jackson	19	1986–87	Georgia Southern
8	Chris Collier	18	1989–90	Centenary
	Terrence Brandon	18	1995–96	Tulane
	Walker Atrice	18	1973–74	Youngstown State

== Assists ==
Career
Rank	Player	Assists	Seasons
1	Rodney Hamilton	535	1994–95 1995–96 1996–97 1997–98
2	Kane Williams	493	2017–18 2018–19 2019–20 2020–21 2021–22
3	Kevin Morris	431	1998–99 1999–00 2000–01
4	Devonta White	414	2010–11 2011–12 2012–13 2013–14
5	D'Marcus Simonds	334	2016–17 2017–18 2018–19
6	Eric Ervin	316	1982–83 1983–84
7	Herman Favors	310	2002–03 2003–04 2004–05 2005–06
	Howie Jarvis	310	1976–77 1977–78 1978–79
9	Justin Roberts	292	2019–20 2020–21 2021–22
10	Boyd Copeland	288	2003–04 2004–05 2005–06

Season
Rank	Player	Assists	Season
1	Eric Ervin	222	1982–83
2	Dewey Haley	174	1985–86
3	Rodney Hamilton	171	1997–98
4	D'Marcus Simonds	153	2017–18
5	Melvin Howard	148	1986–87
6	Devonta White	147	2013–14
7	Kevin Morris	145	1999–00
8	Ryan Harrow	144	2013–14
	Kevin Morris	144	2000–01
10	Kevin Morris	142	1998–99
	Dwon Odom	142	2023–24

Single game
Rank	Player	Assists	Season	Opponent
1	Howie Jarvis	15	1978–79	South Florida
	Eric Ervin	15	1982–83	Utica College
3	Rodney Hamilton	14	1995–96	Florida International
4	Eric Ervin	13	1982–83	Armstrong
	Dewey Haley	13	1985–86	East Tennessee State
	Rodney Hamilton	13	1997–98	Norfolk State
7	Kevin Morris	12	1998–99	Mercer
	Leo Hunt	12	1987–88	Oklahoma
	Melvin Howard	12	1986–87	Houston Baptist
	Rodney Hamilton	12	1997–98	Florida International
	Eric Ervin	12	1982–83	Drexel

== Steals ==
Career
Rank	Player	Steals	Seasons
1	Kane Williams	219	2017–18 2018–19 2019–20 2020–21 2021–22
2	Rodney Hamilton	212	1994–95 1995–96 1996–97 1997–98
3	Kevin Morris	202	1998–99 1999–00 2000–01
4	R.J. Hunter	191	2012–13 2013–14 2014–15
5	Devonta White	164	2010–11 2011–12 2012–13 2013–14
6	Zavian Smith	157	1989–90 1990–91 1991–92 1993–94
7	Shernard Long	146	1999–00 2000–01
8	D'Marcus Simonds	139	2016–17 2017–18 2018–19
	James Fields	139	2008–09 2009–10 2010–11 2011–12
10	Justin Roberts	122	2019–20 2020–21 2021–22

Season
Rank	Player	Steals	Season
1	Kevin Morris	84	2000–01
2	Shernard Long	83	2000–01
3	R.J. Hunter	75	2014–15
4	Kane Williams	64	2018–19
5	R.J. Hunter	63	2013–14
	Shernard Long	63	1999–00
7	Kevin Morris	62	1999–00
8	James Fields	61	2011–12
9	D'Marcus Simonds	60	2017–18
	Devonta White	60	2011–12
	Rodney Hamilton	60	1996–97

Single game
Rank	Player	Steals	Season	Opponent
1	R.J. Hunter	8	2014–15	UL Lafayette
	Shernard Long	8	1999–00	Campbell
	Dewey Haley	8	1984–85	Centenary
	Corey Gauff	8	1991–92	SE Louisiana
	Chris Collier	8	1989–90	Florida International
6	Manny Atkins	7	2013–14	UT Arlington
	R.J. Hunter	7	2013–14	Troy
	James Fields	7	2011–12	UNCW
	Herman Favors	7	2005–06	Charleston
	Shernard Long	7	2000–01	Mercer
	Rodney Hamilton	7	1997–98	Georgetown
	Rodney Hamilton	7	1997–98	Campbell

== Blocks ==
Career
Rank	Player	Blocks	Seasons
1	Zavian Smith	182	1989–90 1990–91 1991–92 1993–94
2	Eric Buckner	167	2010–11 2011–12
3	James Vincent	132	2009–10 2010–11 2011–12 2012–13
4	Curtis Washington	122	2013–14 2014–15
5	Jalen Thomas	116	2019–20 2020–21 2021–22
6	Nate Williams	113	2001–02 2002–03 2003–04
7	Torquin Gresham	110	1997–98 1998–99 1999–00
8	Deven Dickerson	101	2004–05 2005–06 2006–07 2007–08
9	Malik Benlevi	98	2015–16 2016–17 2017–18 2018–19
10	Sylvester Morgan	84	2003–04 2004–05

Season
Rank	Player	Blocks	Season
1	Eric Buckner	118	2011–12
2	Sylvester Morgan	81	2004–05
3	Curtis Washington	78	2013–14
4	James Vincent	70	2012–13
5	Zavian Smith	62	1991–92
6	Zavian Smith	54	1993–94
7	Eric Buckner	49	2010–11
8	Jalen Thomas	48	2021–22
	Cesare Edwards	48	2024–25
10	Deven Dickerson	47	2006–07

Single game
Rank	Player	Blocks	Season	Opponent
1	Curtis Washington	9	2013–14	Southern Poly
	James Vincent	9	2012–13	Monmouth
	Sylvester Morgan	9	2004–05	Mercer
4	James Vincent	8	2012–13	James Madison
	Eric Buckner	8	2010–11	FIU
6	Eric Buckner	7	2011–12	Liberty
	Sylvester Morgan	7	2004–05	Lipscomb
	Nate Williams	7	2003–04	Stetson
