= List of Jacksonville Dolphins men's basketball head coaches =

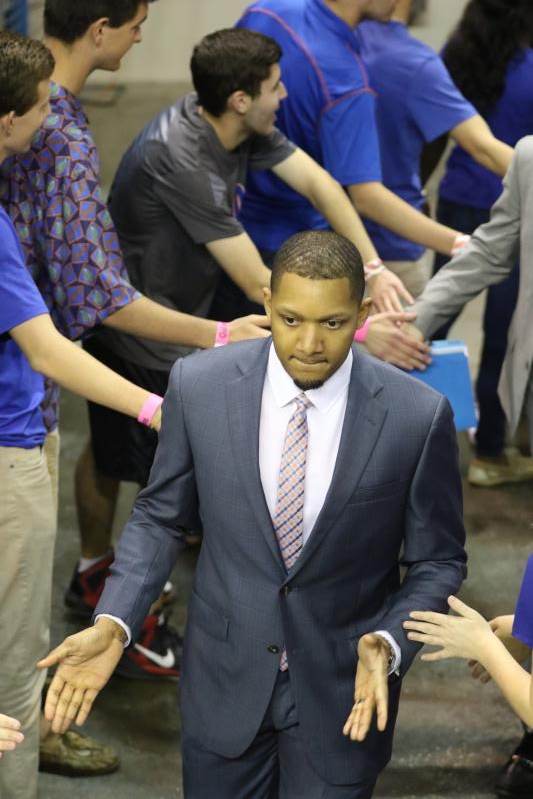
Jordan Mincy, the current head coach of the Jacksonville Dolphins.

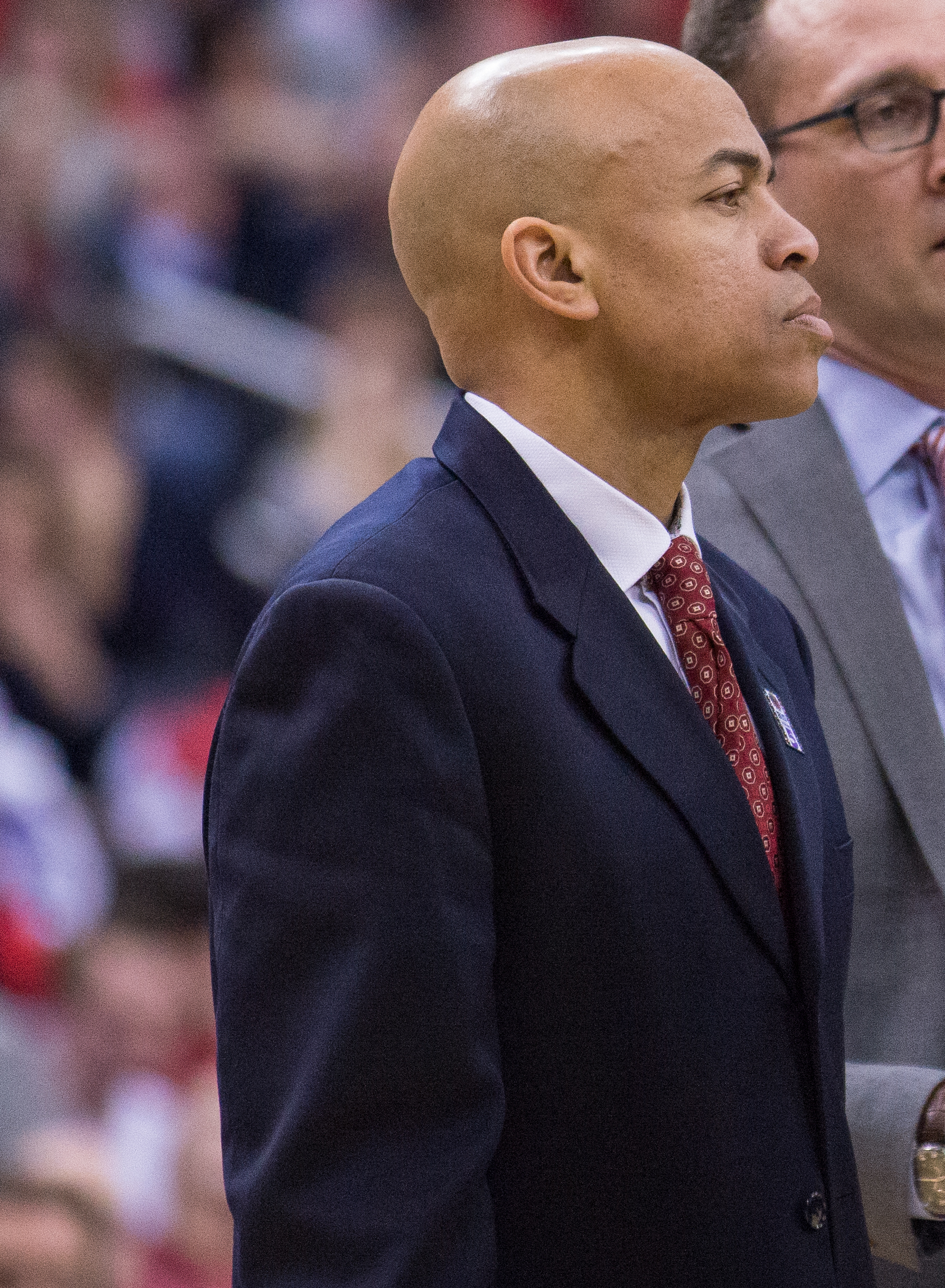
Cliff Warren, the winningest head coach in Dolphins men's basketball history.

The following is a list of Jacksonville Dolphins men's basketball head coaches. There have been 17 head coaches of the Dolphins in their 75-season history.

Jacksonville's current head coach is Jordan Mincy. He was hired as the Dolphins' head coach in March 2021, replacing Tony Jasick, who was fired after the 2020–21 season.

No.	Tenure	Coach	Years	Record	Pct.
1	1948–1953	John Geilen	5	67–32	.677
2	1953–1960	Rollie Rourke	7	107–47	.695
3	1960–1964	Dick Kendall	4	51–49	.510
4	1964–1970	Joe Williams	6	92–61	.601
5	1970–1973	Tom Wasdin	3	63–18	.778
6	1973–1975	Bob Gottlieb	2	35–21	.625
7	1975–1978	Don Beasley	3	37–46	.446
8	1978–1981	Tates Locke	3	47–39	.547
9	1981–1987	Bob Wenzel	6	88–86	.506
10	1987–1991	Rich Haddad	4	41–75	.353
11	1991–1994	Matt Kilcullen	3	34–50	.405
12	1994–1996 (Note: Scholz was reassigned in December 1996 before being fired in February 1997. Buster Harvey served as interim coach for the remainder of the 1996–97 season after Scholz's reassignment.)	George Scholz	3	33–28	.541
13	1996–1997*	Buster Harvey	1	5–17	.227
14	1997–2005	Hugh Durham	8	106–119	.471
15	2005–2014	Cliff Warren	9	126–150	.457
16	2014–2021	Tony Jasick	7	95–123	.436
17	2021–present	Jordan Mincy	5	81–77	.513
Totals		17 coaches	79 seasons	1,108–1,038	.516
Records updated through end of 2025–26 season * - Denotes interim head coach. Source
