= Atlantic Sun Conference Men's Basketball Coach of the Year =

ASUN Conference Men's Basketball Coach of the Year
- Awarded for: the best head coach in the ASUN Conference
- Country: United States

History
- First award: 1979
- Most recent: John Shulman, Central Arkansas

The Atlantic Sun Conference Men's Basketball Coach of the Year award is given to the men's basketball head coach in the Atlantic Sun Conference voted as the best by the league's head coaches. It was first awarded at the end of the 1978–79 season, the first season of existence of what was then known as the Trans America Athletic Conference (TAAC). However, the conference did not establish a full regular-season schedule until 1979–80.

There has been one tie for the award, in 2019–20, while 11 coaches have received two or more awards. The program with the most awards (five) and most individual honorees (three), Mercer, left the ASUN in 2014. North Florida has the most awards among current members with three, while the only current member with more than one individual recipient is Lipscomb with two.

== Key ==
†	Co-Coaches of the Year
Coach (X)	Denotes the number of times the coach has been awarded the ASUN Coach of the Year award at that point
Conf. W–L	Conference win–loss record for that season
Conf. St.^{T}	Conference standing at year's end (^{T}denotes a tie; E stands for East, W for West, N for North, and S for South Divisions)
Overall W–L	Overall win–loss record for that season

== Winners ==
School names reflect the current branding of their respective athletic programs, not necessarily those in use during a program's ASUN membership or in a specific season.

Season	Coach	School	Conf. W–L	Conf. St.	Overall W–L
1978–79 (Note: The TAAC did not play a conference schedule in its first season of existence.)	Lenny Fant	Louisiana–Monroe (Note: Known as Northeast Louisiana until the 1999–2000 season.)	—N/a	—N/a	23–6
1979–80	Bill Bibb	Mercer	3–3	3^{T}	16–12
1980–81	Gene Iba	Houston Christian (Note: Known as Houston Baptist before the 2022–23 season.)	9–3	1	18–10
1981–82	Ron Kestenbaum	Little Rock (Note: Athletically known as Arkansas–Little Rock or UALR until the 2015–16 season.)	12–4	1	19–8
1982–83	Frank Kerns	Georgia Southern	8–6	3^{T}	18–12
1983–84	Mike Hanks	Samford	10–4	2	22–8
1984–85	Bill Bibb (2)	Mercer	10–4	2^{T}	22–9
1985–86	Mike Newell	Little Rock	12–2	1	23–11
1986–87	Frank Kerns (2)	Georgia Southern	12–6	4	20–11
1987–88	Frank Kerns (3)	Georgia Southern	15–3	1^{T}	24–7
1988–89	Mike Newell (2)	Little Rock	14–4	2	23–8
1989–90	Tommy Vardeman	Centenary	14–2	1	22–8
1990–91	Tommy Vardeman (2)	Centenary	10–4	2	17–12
1991–92	Frank Kerns (4)	Georgia Southern	13–1	1	25–6
1992–93	Bob Weltlich	FIU	9–3	1	20–10
1993–94	John Kresse	Charleston	15–1	1	23–6
1994–95	Dan Hipsher	Stetson	11–5	2^{T}	15–12
1995–96	Billy Lee	Campbell	11–5	2 (E)	17–11
1996–97	John Kresse (2)	Charleston	16–0	1 (E) (Note: Also best overall conference record.)	29–3
1997–98	John Kresse (3)	Charleston	14–2	1 (E)	24–6
1998–99	Jimmy Tillette	Samford	15–1	1	24–6
1999–00	Don Maestri	Troy (Note: Known as Troy State until the 2004–05 season.)	13–5	1^{T}	17–11
2000–01	Lefty Driesell	Georgia State	16–2	1	29–5
2001–02	Sidney Green	Florida Atlantic	13–7	3	19–12
2002–03	Mark Slonaker	Mercer	10–6	1^{T} (S) (Note: Also tied for best overall conference record.)	23–6
2003–04	Don Maestri (2)	Troy	18–2	1	24–7
2004–05	Rick Scruggs	Gardner–Webb	13–7	1^{T}	18–12
2005–06	Scott Sanderson	Lipscomb	15–5	1^{T}	21–11
2006–07	Murry Bartow	East Tennessee State	16–2	1	24–10
2007–08	Rick Byrd	Belmont	14–2	1	25–9
2008–09	Cliff Warren	Jacksonville	15–5	1	18–14
2009–10	Robbie Laing	Campbell	14–6	1^{T}	19–11
2010–11	Rick Byrd (2)	Belmont	14–4	2	27–7
2011–12	Eddie Payne	USC Upstate	13–5	2^{T}	22–13
2012–13	Bob Hoffman	Mercer	14–4	1	24–12
2013–14	Bob Hoffman (2)	Mercer	14–4	1^{T}	27–9
2014–15	Matthew Driscoll	North Florida	12–2	1	23–12
2015–16	Matthew Driscoll (2)	North Florida	10–4	1	22–12
2016–17	Joe Dooley	Florida Gulf Coast	12–2	1	26–8
2017–18	Joe Dooley (2)	Florida Gulf Coast	12–2	1	23–12
2018–19	Casey Alexander	Lipscomb	14–2	1^{T}	29–8
2019–20^{†}	Matthew Driscoll (3)	North Florida	13–3	1^{T}	21–12
2019–20^{†}	Ritchie McKay	Liberty	13–3	1^{T}	30–4
2020–21	Ritchie McKay (2)	Liberty	11–2	1	23–6
2021–22	Ray Harper	Jacksonville State	13–3	1 (W)	21–11
2022–23	Amir Abdur-Rahim	Kennesaw State	15–3	1	26–8
2023–24	A. W. Hamilton	Eastern Kentucky	12–4	1	17–14
2024–25	Lennie Acuff	Lipscomb	14–4	1	23–9
2025–26	John Shulman	Central Arkansas	15–3	1^{T}	20–11

== See also ==
- ASUN Conference
- ASUN men's basketball tournament
- Associated Press College Basketball Coach of the Year
- Henry Iba Award
- NABC Coach of the Year
- Naismith College Coach of the Year
