= 1991–92 Georgia Southern Eagles men's basketball team =

American college basketball season

1991–92 Georgia Southern Eagles men's basketball

TAAC Regular season champion TAAC tournament champion

NCAA tournament
- Conference: Trans America Athletic Conference
- Record: 25–6 (13–1 TAAC)
- Head coach: Frank Kerns (11th season)
- Associate head coach: Mike Backus (12th season)
- Assistant coaches: Robbie Laing (7th overall, 5th season); Michael Stokes (2nd season)
- Home arena: Hanner Fieldhouse

1991–92 Trans America Athletic Conference men's basketball standings
	Conf.				Overall
Team	W		L	PCT	W		L	PCT
Georgia Southern †	13	–	1	.929	25	–	6	.806
Georgia State	8	–	6	.571	16	–	14	.533
Florida International	7	–	7	.500	11	–	17	.393
Samford	7	–	7	.500	11	–	18	.379
Stetson	6	–	8	.429	11	–	17	.393
Mercer	6	–	8	.429	11	–	18	.379
Centenary (LA)	5	–	9	.357	10	–	18	.357
Southeastern Louisiana	4	–	10	.286	6	–	22	.214
† 1992 TAAC tournament winner Rankings from AP Poll

The 1991–92 Georgia Southern Eagles men's basketball team represented Georgia Southern University during the 1991–92 NCAA Division I men's basketball season. The Eagles, led by 10th-year head coach Frank Kerns, played their home games at Hanner Fieldhouse in Statesboro, Georgia as members of the Trans America Athletic Conference. The team won the regular season conference title and the TAAC tournament to earn an automatic bid to the NCAA tournament. As the No. 15 seed in the Southeast region, the Eagles lost in the opening round to Oklahoma State, 100–73, to finish with a 25–6 record (13–1 TAAC).

== Roster ==
1991–92 Georgia Southern Eagles men's basketball team
Players
Coaches

Pos.	#	Name	Height	Weight	Year	Previous school	Hometown
G/F	3	Tommy Williams	6 ft 4 in (1.93 m)	187 lb (85 kg)	Jr	Jefferson Davis High School	Montgomery, AL
G/F	4	Monty Noblitt	6 ft 4 in (1.93 m)	206 lb (93 kg)	Jr	Vancleave High School	Vancleave, MS
G	11	Adonis Hill	6 ft 0 in (1.83 m)	170 lb (77 kg)	RS Fr	Newberry High School	Newberry, SC
G	12	Charlton Young	6 ft 2 in (1.88 m)	150 lb (68 kg)	Jr	Miami Carol City Senior High School	Miami, FL
G	13	Mickhal Locklear	5 ft 11 in (1.8 m)	180 lb (82 kg)	Fr	Sprayberry High School	Marietta, GA
G	20	Roger Montgomery	6 ft 6 in (1.98 m)	196 lb (89 kg)	So	Fairfax High School; Pratt Community College	Los Angeles, CA
F	21	Pierre McKisic	6 ft 5 in (1.96 m)	171 lb (78 kg)	Fr	Tri-Cities High School	College Park, GA
F	23	Joby Powell	6 ft 6 in (1.98 m)	244 lb (111 kg)	So	Jenkins High School	Savannah, GA
G	24	Wendell Charles	6 ft 4 in (1.93 m)	183 lb (83 kg)	Sr	Wichita South High School; Hutchinson Community College	Wichita, KS
F	25	Tony Windless	6 ft 4 in (1.93 m)	190 lb (86 kg)	Sr	Northside High School; Cowley Community College	Memphis, TN
F	33	Calvin Sinkfield	6 ft 5 in (1.96 m)	202 lb (92 kg)	Jr	Griffin High School; Odessa College	Griffin, GA
F	34	Shawn Brown	6 ft 5 in (1.96 m)	253 lb (115 kg)	Fr	Harvester Cathedral Academy	Tallahassee, FL
C	40	Dexter Abrams	6 ft 7 in (2.01 m)	214 lb (97 kg)	Jr	Jones County High School; Howard College	Gray, GA
F	44	Chris Birden	6 ft 5 in (1.96 m)	211 lb (96 kg)	Jr	L. W. Higgins High School; New Mexico Junior College	Avondale, LA
F	54	D'Andre Goggans	6 ft 6 in (1.98 m)	256 lb (116 kg)	Fr	T. W. Josey High School	Augusta, GA

Head coach

- Frank Kerns

Assistant coach(es)

- Mike Backus (Hampton)
- Robbie Laing (Troy)
- Michael Stokes (Georgia Southern)

Legend

- (C) Team captain
- (S) Suspended
- (I) Ineligible
- (W) Walk-on
- Injured
- Current redshirt

Roster
Last update: March 10, 2023

== Schedule and results ==
Date time, TV	Rank^{#}	Opponent^{#}	Result	Record	Site (attendance) city, state
Regular season
November 23, 1991*; 7:30 pm		Bethune-Cookman	W 111–73	1–0	Hanner Fieldhouse (2,699); Statesboro, GA
November 25, 1991*; 7:30 pm		at Appalachian State	W 81–80	2–0	Varsity Gymnasium (4,462); Boone, NC
November 30, 1991*; 7:30 pm		Tennessee Tech	W 103–86	3–0	Hanner Fieldhouse (1,731); Statesboro, GA
December 7, 1991*; 7:30 pm		Fort Valley State	W 110–88	4–0	Hanner Fieldhouse (2,175); Statesboro, GA
December 9, 1991*; 7:30 pm		Troy State	W 102–94	5–0	Hanner Fieldhouse (1,774); Statesboro, GA
December 14, 1991*; 7:30 pm		Furman	L 77–80	5–1	Hanner Fieldhouse (2,330); Statesboro, GA
December 17, 1991*; 7:30 pm		Brewton–Parker College	W 106–91	6–1	Hanner Fieldhouse (1,620); Statesboro, GA
December 20, 1991*; 8:00 pm		vs. Pepperdine; UAB Invitational	W 79–73	7–1	UAB Arena (4,524); Birmingham, AL
December 21, 1991*; 10:00 pm		vs. UAB; UAB Invitational	L 69–87	7–2	UAB Arena (4,756); Birmingham, AL
December 30, 1991*; 8:30 pm		at Tennessee Tech	L 90–92	7–3	Eblen Center (3,620); Cookeville, TN
January 2, 1992*; 7:30 pm		West Georgia	W 115–94	8–3	Hanner Fieldhouse (1,128); Statesboro, GA
January 6, 1992*; 7:30 pm		Appalachian State	W 88–77	9–3	Hanner Fieldhouse (2,296); Statesboro, GA
January 9, 1992; 8:30 pm		at Samford	W 83–65	10–3 (1–0)	Seibert Hall (694); Homewood, AL
January 11, 1992; 7:30 pm		at Georgia State	W 88–87	11–3 (2–0)	GSU Sports Arena (2,114); Atlanta, GA
January 16, 1992; 7:30 pm		Centenary	W 119–91	12–3 (3–0)	Hanner Fieldhouse (2,159); Statesboro, GA
January 18, 1992; 7:30 pm		Southeastern Louisiana	W 90–75	13–3 (4–0)	Hanner Fieldhouse (2,048); Statesboro, GA
January 22, 1992*; 7:30 pm		at Furman	L 70–76	13–4	Memorial Auditorium (2,346); Greenville, SC
January 25, 1992; 4:00 pm		at Mercer	W 90–75	14–4 (5–0)	Macon Coliseum (1,200); Macon, GA
January 30, 1992; 7:35 pm		at Stetson	W 103–67	15–4 (6–0)	Edmunds Center (1,553); DeLand, FL
February 1, 1992; 8:00 pm		at FIU	W 78–72	16–4 (7–0)	Golden Panther Arena (828); Miami, FL
February 6, 1992; 7:30 pm		Samford	W 73–62	17–4 (8–0)	Hanner Fieldhouse (2,328); Statesboro, GA
February 8, 1992; 7:30 pm		Georgia State	W 91–84	18–4 (9–0)	Hanner Fieldhouse (4,056); Statesboro, GA
February 13, 1992; 8:05 pm		at Centenary	L 106–110 ^{OT}	18–5 (9–1)	Gold Dome (1,687); Shreveport, LA
February 15, 1992; 8:00 pm		at Southeastern Louisiana	W 79–72	19–5 (10–1)	University Center (866); Hammond, LA
February 22, 1992; 7:30 pm		Mercer	W 81–74	20–5 (11–1)	Hanner Fieldhouse (3,124); Statesboro, GA
February 27, 1992; 7:30 pm		Stetson	W 104–76	21–5 (12–1)	Hanner Fieldhouse (2,103); Statesboro, GA
February 29, 1992; 2:00 pm		FIU	W 95–71	22–5 (13–1)	Hanner Fieldhouse (2,428); Statesboro, GA
TAAC Tournament
March 6, 1992*	(1)	(8) Southeastern Louisiana; Quarterfinals	W 106–86	23–5	Hanner Fieldhouse (2,128); Statesboro, Georgia
March 7, 1992*	(1)	(4) Samford; Semifinals	W 81–61	24–5	Hanner Fieldhouse (1,386); Statesboro, Georgia
March 8, 1992*; ESPN	(1)	(2) Georgia State; Championship Game	W 95–82	25–5	Hanner Fieldhouse (4,543); Statesboro, Georgia
NCAA tournament
March 20, 1992*	(15 SE)	vs. (2 SE) No. 11 Oklahoma State; First Round	L 73–100	25–6	The Omni (10,820); Atlanta, Georgia
*Non-conference game. ^{#}Rankings from AP poll. (#) Tournament seedings in parentheses. SE=Southeast. All times are in Eastern.

Source,
