= 1986–87 Georgia Southern Eagles men's basketball team =

American college basketball season

1986–87 Georgia Southern Eagles men's basketball

TAAC tournament champion

NCAA tournament
- Conference: Trans America Athletic Conference
- Record: 20–11 (12–6 TAAC)
- Head coach: Frank Kerns (5th season)
- Home arena: Hanner Fieldhouse

1986–87 Trans America Athletic Conference men's basketball standings
	Conf.				Overall
Team	W		L	PCT	W		L	PCT
Arkansas–Little Rock	16	–	2	.889	26	–	11	.703
Houston Baptist	13	–	5	.722	18	–	11	.621
Stetson	13	–	5	.722	18	–	13	.581
Georgia Southern †	12	–	6	.667	20	–	11	.645
Hardin–Simmons	9	–	9	.500	13	–	15	.464
Texas–San Antonio	7	–	11	.389	13	–	15	.464
Mercer	7	–	11	.389	12	–	16	.429
Georgia State	7	–	11	.389	11	–	17	.393
Centenary	5	–	13	.278	10	–	17	.370
Samford	1	–	17	.056	4	–	22	.154
† 1987 TAAC tournament winner Rankings from AP Poll

The 1986–87 Georgia Southern Eagles men's basketball team represented Georgia Southern University during the 1986–87 NCAA Division I men's basketball season. The Eagles, led by fifth year head coach Frank Kerns, played their home games at Hanner Fieldhouse in Statesboro, Georgia as members of the Trans America Athletic Conference. The team finished fourth in the regular season conference standings and won the TAAC tournament to earn an automatic bid to the NCAA tournament. As No. 15 seed in the East region, the Eagles lost in the opening round to No. 2 seed and eventual National runner-up Syracuse, 79–73, to finish with a 20–11 record (12–6 TAAC).

== Roster ==
1986–87 Georgia Southern Eagles men's basketball team
Players
Coaches

Pos.	#	Name	Height	Weight	Year	Hometown
G/F	20	Michael Curry	6 ft 5 in (1.96 m)	195 lb (88 kg)	Fr	Augusta, Georgia
F	42	Jeff Sanders	6 ft 8 in (2.03 m)	215 lb (98 kg)	So	Augusta, Georgia

Head coach

- Frank Kerns

Assistant coach(es)

Legend

- (C) Team captain
- (S) Suspended
- (I) Ineligible
- (W) Walk-on
- Injured
- Current redshirt

Roster

== Schedule and results ==
Date time, TV	Rank^{#}	Opponent^{#}	Result	Record	Site (attendance) city, state
Regular season
Dec 29, 1986*		vs. No. 14 Temple	L 61–80	4–3	John F. Savage Hall; Toledo, OH
Dec 30, 1986*		vs. Air Force	L 82–87	4–4	John F. Savage Hall; Toledo, OH
TAAC tournament
Mar 5, 1987*		vs. Hardin-Simmons	W 73–66	18–10	Barton Coliseum; Little Rock, Arkansas
Mar 6, 1987*		at Arkansas–Little Rock	W 70–62	19–10	Barton Coliseum; Little Rock, Arkansas
Mar 7, 1987*		vs. Stetson; Championship game	W 49–46	20–10	Barton Coliseum; Little Rock, Arkansas
NCAA tournament
Mar 13, 1987*	(15 E)	vs. (2 E) No. 10 Syracuse; First Round	L 73–79	20–11	Carrier Dome; Syracuse, New York
*Non-conference game. ^{#}Rankings from AP poll. (#) Tournament seedings in parentheses. E=East. All times are in Eastern.
