= 1987 TAAC men's basketball tournament =

- Classification: Division I
- Season: 1986–87
- Teams: 8
- Site: Barton Coliseum; Little Rock, Arkansas
- Champions: Georgia Southern (2nd title)
- Winning coach: Frank Kerns (2nd title)
- MVP: Jeff Sanders (Georgia Southern)
- TAAC men's basketball tournaments

1986–87 Trans America Athletic Conference men's basketball standings
| | Conf. | | | | Overall |
| Team | W | | L | PCT | W | | L | PCT |
|---|---|---|---|---|---|---|---|---|
| Arkansas–Little Rock | 16 | – | 2 | .889 | 26 | – | 11 | .703 |
| Houston Baptist | 13 | – | 5 | .722 | 18 | – | 11 | .621 |
| Stetson | 13 | – | 5 | .722 | 18 | – | 13 | .581 |
| Georgia Southern † | 12 | – | 6 | .667 | 20 | – | 11 | .645 |
| Hardin–Simmons | 9 | – | 9 | .500 | 13 | – | 15 | .464 |
| Texas–San Antonio | 7 | – | 11 | .389 | 13 | – | 15 | .464 |
| Mercer | 7 | – | 11 | .389 | 12 | – | 16 | .429 |
| Georgia State | 7 | – | 11 | .389 | 11 | – | 17 | .393 |
| Centenary | 5 | – | 13 | .278 | 10 | – | 17 | .370 |
| Samford | 1 | – | 17 | .056 | 4 | – | 22 | .154 |
† 1987 TAAC tournament winner Rankings from AP Poll

The 1987 Trans America Athletic Conference men's basketball tournament (now known as the ASUN men's basketball tournament) was held March 7–9 at Barton Coliseum in Little Rock, Arkansas.

Georgia Southern defeated conference newcomer Stetson in the championship game, 49–46, to win their second TAAC/Atlantic Sun men's basketball tournament. The Eagles, therefore, received an automatic bid to the 1987 NCAA tournament.

Texas–San Antonio joined the TAAC for the 1986–87 season, bringing the total conference membership to 10. However, only the top eight teams were invited to participate in the 1987 conference tournament.

== Bracket ==
Quarterfinals; Thursday, March 7
1 | Arkansas–Little Rock | 62
8 | Texas–San Antonio | 60
5 | Hardin–Simmons | 66
4 | Georgia Southern | 73
3 | Houston Baptist | 73
6 | Georgia State | 64
7 | Mercer | 68
2 | Stetson | 75

Semifinals; Friday, March 8
1 | Arkansas–Little Rock | 62
4 | Georgia Southern | 70
3 | Houston Baptist | 68
2 | Stetson | 73

Championship; Saturday, March 9
4 | Georgia Southern | 49
2 | Stetson | 46
