= Bob Reinhart =

American basketball player and coach (1938–2025)

Biographical details
- Born: June 21, 1938; Dale, Indiana, U.S.
- Died: October 20, 2025 (aged 87); Tampa, Florida, U.S.

Playing career
- 1957–1958: Kentucky Wesleyan
- 1958–1960: Indiana

Coaching career (HC unless noted)
- 1961–1964: Oakland City HS
- 1965–1968: Decatur HS (assistant)
- 1968–1983: Decatur HS
- 1983–1985: Atlanta Hawks (assistant)
- 1985–1994: Georgia State

Accomplishments and honors

Championships
- Trans America Athletic Conference tournament (1991)

Awards
- Two-time Atlanta Tip-Off Club Coach of the Year (1991, 1994); Indiana Basketball Hall of Fame (2017); Atlanta Sports Hall of Fame (2017)

Robert Leon Reinhart Sr. (June 21, 1938 – October 20, 2025) was an American basketball coach who served as the men's head coach for the Georgia State Panthers from 1985 to 1994. In 1991, he led the Panthers to their first NCAA tournament appearance. Reinhart was twice named Atlanta Tip-Off Club Coach of the Year. He was inducted into the Indiana Basketball Hall of Fame in 2017.

After his time as head coach at Georgia State, Reinhart spent over two decades as an NBA scout. He worked as a scout for Utah, Boston, Milwaukee, and Golden State, and earned two championship rings from his time with the Miami Heat.

== Playing career ==
A native of Indiana, Reinhart was the starting point guard for the Dale (High School) Golden Aces and played with future Georgia Tech All-American, Roger Kaiser. Reinhart led the team in assists and was second in scoring behind Kaiser for the 1956 and 1957 sectional champion squads.

In college, Reinhart spent one quarter at Kentucky Wesleyan College before transferring to Indiana University to play for Branch McCracken.

At Indiana, Reinhart was a two-sport letterwinner who led the 1961 baseball team in runs (28).

== Early coaching years ==
Reinhart's coaching career began at the high school level in Indiana with Oakland City. He coached the Acorns for three seasons and managed a .500 record. His move to the Atlanta area was prompted by a call from former teammate, Roger Kaiser, who asked Reinhart to join his staff at Decatur High School. Reinhart spent four seasons as an assistant to Kaiser before becoming Decatur's head coach. He led the boys' team to three state titles ('70, '80, '82) in the 14 years he was the head coach. Reinhart's tenure also included a 57-game win streak, eight trips to the final eight in the state playoffs, and six final fours. His son, Bobby, played on his 1982 title team.

== Atlanta Hawks ==
A household name in the Atlanta basketball scene, Bob Reinhart worked Mike Fratello’s Atlanta Hawks camps every summer. In 1984, Fratello hired Reinhart as an assistant coach on the Hawks staff where he spent two seasons. In those two years, Reinhart coached players including Dominique Wilkins and Doc Rivers.

== Head coach at Georgia State ==
When Reinhart took the head coaching job at Georgia State in 1985, the Panthers had just gone 2–26 the season prior. In his first season, the team finished with 10 wins. In the 1990–91 season, Reinhart's team finished the regular season 13–14 before achieving a series of "firsts" for Georgia State in the conference tournament. GSU had never before won a game in the conference tournament, had never beaten Little Rock, and had been swept in the regular season by all three teams they would end up facing in the tournament. The fifth-seeded Panthers went on to beat Stetson, UTSA, and Little Rock to win their first Trans America Athletic Conference tournament title and earn the school's first NCAA tournament bid.

Reinhart's overall record at Georgia State was 107–148. At the time, that was a record number of wins and his nine seasons coached remain a school-record tenure.

== Head coaching record ==
=== College ===
Record table
Season	Team	Overall	Conference	Standing	Postseason
Georgia State Panthers (Trans America Athletic Conference) (1985–1994)
1985–86	Georgia State	10–18	4–10	8th	
1986–87	Georgia State	11–17	7–11	T–6th	
1987–88	Georgia State	9–19	5–13	8th	
1988–89	Georgia State	14–14	9–9	T–4th	
1989–90	Georgia State	5–23	3–13	8th	
1990–91	Georgia State	16–15	7–7	5th	NCAA Division I First Round
1991–92	Georgia State	16–14	8–6	2nd	
1992–93	Georgia State	13–14	5–7	5th	
1993–94	Georgia State	13–14	9–7	T–3rd	
Georgia State:		107–148 (.420)	57–83 (.407)		
Total:		107–148 (.420)			
National champion Postseason invitational champion Conference regular season champion Conference regular season and conference tournament champion Division regular season champion Division regular season and conference tournament champion Conference tournament champion

== Personal life and death ==
Reinhart and his wife Jane had two children, Kelly and Bobby, and four grandchildren. Reinhart died in Tampa, Florida on October 20, 2025, at the age of 87.
