= 1992 TAAC men's basketball tournament =

- Classification: Division I
- Season: 1991–92
- Teams: 8
- Site: Hanner Fieldhouse; Statesboro, GA
- Champions: Georgia Southern (3rd title)
- Winning coach: Frank Kerns (3rd title)
- MVP: Charlton Young (Georgia Southern)
- TAAC men's basketball tournaments

1991–92 Trans America Athletic Conference men's basketball standings
	Conf.				Overall
Team	W		L	PCT	W		L	PCT
Georgia Southern †	13	–	1	.929	25	–	6	.806
Georgia State	8	–	6	.571	16	–	14	.533
Florida International	7	–	7	.500	11	–	17	.393
Samford	7	–	7	.500	11	–	18	.379
Stetson	6	–	8	.429	11	–	17	.393
Mercer	6	–	8	.429	11	–	18	.379
Centenary (LA)	5	–	9	.357	10	–	18	.357
Southeastern Louisiana	4	–	10	.286	6	–	22	.214
† 1992 TAAC tournament winner Rankings from AP Poll

The 1992 Trans America Athletic Conference men's basketball tournament (now known as the ASUN men's basketball tournament) was held March 6–8 at the Hanner Fieldhouse in Statesboro, Georgia.

Hosts Georgia Southern defeated Georgia State in the championship game, 95–82, to win their third TAAC/Atlantic Sun men's basketball tournament. The Eagles, therefore, received the TAAC's automatic bid to the 1992 NCAA tournament.

Two teams, Arkansas–Little Rock and Texas–San Antonio, departed the TAAC prior to the season (UALR joined the Sun Belt and UTSA joined the Southland). In turn, the two were replaced by Southeastern Louisiana and Florida International, thus maintaining conference membership at eight teams.

The TAAC tournament was not held again until 1994.

== Bracket ==
Quarterfinals; Friday, March 6
1	Georgia Southern	106
8	Southeastern Louisiana	86
5	Stetson	44
4	Samford	58
3	Florida International	72
6	Mercer	98
7	Centenary (LA)	69
2	Georgia State	84

Semifinals; Saturday, March 7
1	Georgia Southern	81
4	Samford	61
6	Mercer	68
2	Georgia State	75

Championship; Sunday, March 8
1	Georgia Southern	95
2	Georgia State	82
