= Lefty Driesell =

American basketball coach (1931–2024)

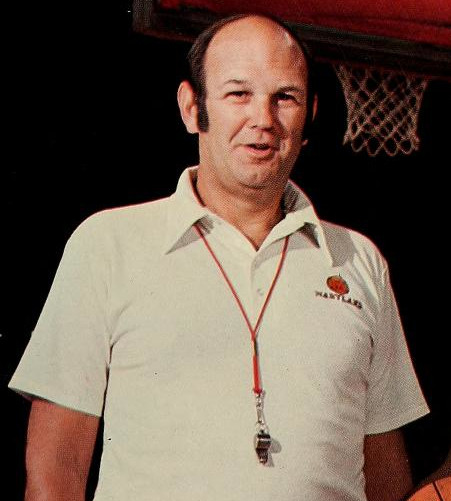
- Driesell in 1976

Biographical details
- Born: December 25, 1931; Norfolk, Virginia, U.S.
- Died: February 17, 2024 (aged 92); Virginia Beach, Virginia, U.S.

Playing career
- 1951–1954: Duke
- Position: Center

Coaching career (HC unless noted)
- 1954–1956: Granby HS (VA)
- 1957–1959: Newport News HS (VA)
- 1960–1969: Davidson
- 1969–1986: Maryland
- 1988–1996: James Madison
- 1997–2003: Georgia State

Administrative career (AD unless noted)
- 1986–1988: Maryland (asst. AD)

Head coaching record
- Overall: 786–394 (college)

Accomplishments and honors

Championships
- NIT (1972); ACC tournament (1984); 2× ACC regular season (1975, 1980); 3× SoCon tournament (1966, 1968, 1969); 5× SoCon regular season (1964–1966, 1968, 1969); CAA tournament (1994); 5× CAA regular season (1990–1994); TAAC tournament (2001); 4× TAAC/ASUN regular season (1998, 2000–2002); FIBA Intercontinental Cup champion (1974)

Awards
- 2× ACC Coach of the Year (1975, 1980); 4× SoCon Coach of the Year (1963–1966); 2× CAA Coach of the Year (1990, 1992); TAAC Coach of the Year (2001); NCAA Award of Valor (1974)
- Basketball Hall of Fame; Inducted in 2018
- College Basketball Hall of Fame; Inducted in 2007

Charles Grice "Lefty" Driesell (December 25, 1931 – February 17, 2024) was an American college basketball coach. He was the first coach to win more than 100 games at four different NCAA Division I schools, Driesell led the programs of Davidson College, the University of Maryland, James Madison University, and Georgia State University. He earned a reputation as "the greatest program builder in the history of basketball." At the time of his retirement in 2003, he was the fourth-winningest NCAA Division I men's basketball college coach, with 21 seasons of 20 or more wins, and 21 conference or conference tournament titles. Driesell played college basketball at Duke University.

== Early life ==
Driesell was born on December 25, 1931, in Norfolk, Virginia, to Frank Driesell, a jeweler who had emigrated from Germany. In the fourth grade, Driesell received the nickname "Lefty" for his left-handedness. He attended Granby High School and quickly became a star on the basketball team. Driesell earned the city's most outstanding player trophy and All-State recognition while leading Granby to the Virginia State Basketball Championship. He was named tournament MVP, totaling 59 points in three games.

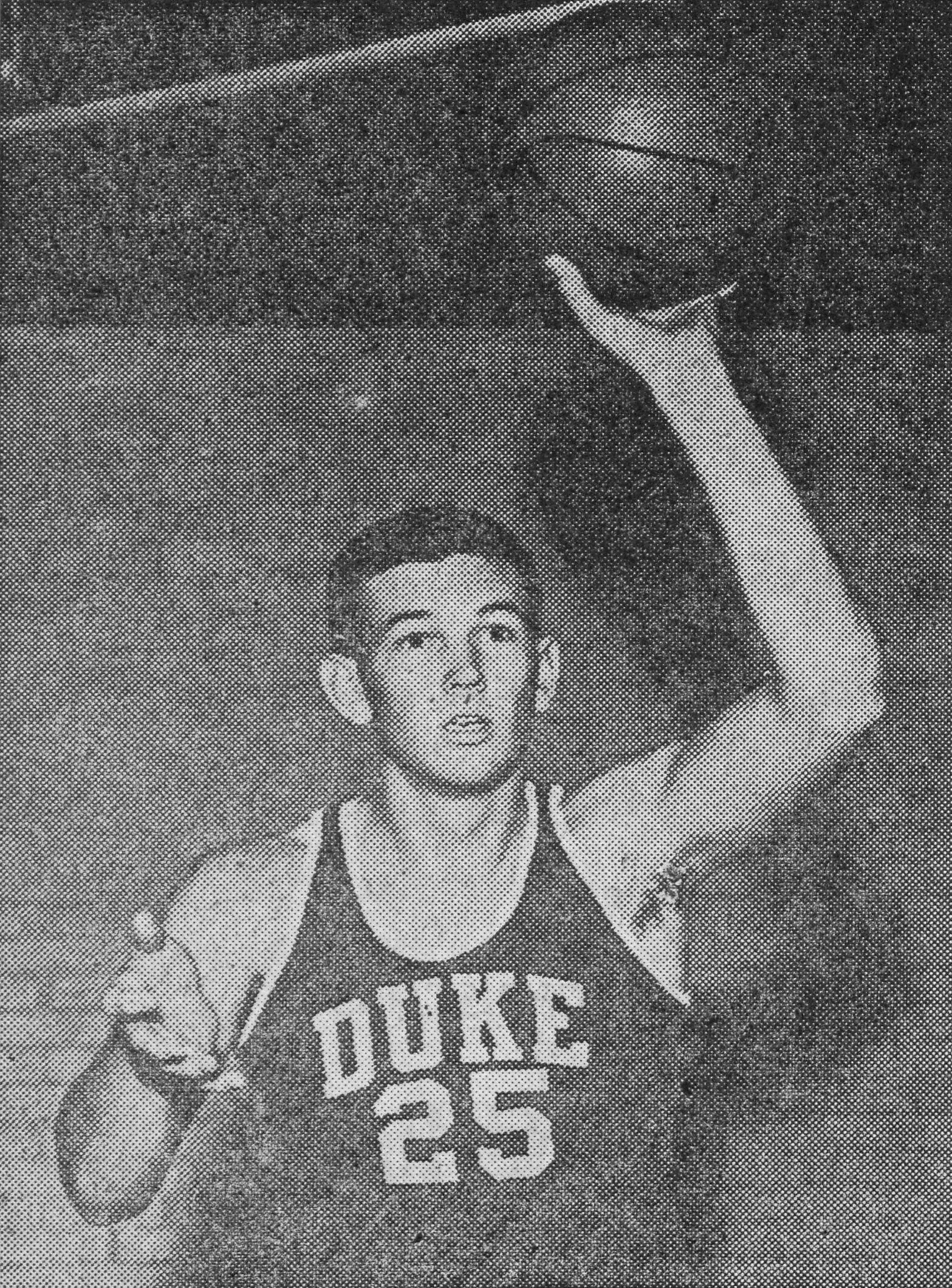
Driesell playing for Duke, circa 1952

After graduating high school in 1950, Driesell received a full scholarship to attend Duke University, where he played center on the basketball team under head coach Harold Bradley. Driesell graduated with a bachelor's degree in education in 1954.

== Coaching career ==
After college in 1954, Driesell took an office job with the Ford Motor Company. Driesell also found time to renew his playing career by joining the Virginia semi-pro ranks, where he once scored 59 points in a single game and earned a tryout with the then Minneapolis Lakers (later Los Angeles Lakers) of the National Basketball Association (NBA). He was also given a chance to enter the coaching profession when his prep alma mater offered him its junior varsity position for both football and basketball. After convincing his wife he could offset a significant pay cut by also selling World Book Encyclopedias part-time, he accepted the job and produced back-to-back unbeaten football teams and a city basketball champion in his first two years.

Driesell was promoted to varsity basketball coach in 1957, going 15–5 before moving to traditional in-state basketball power Newport News High School. There he inherited a team in the midst of a winning streak that he would build to a still-standing state record 57 straight. That unbeaten team won the Virginia Group I State Championship, besting his old Granby squad with four of his former starters. His combined varsity record at the two schools was 97–15.

=== Davidson ===
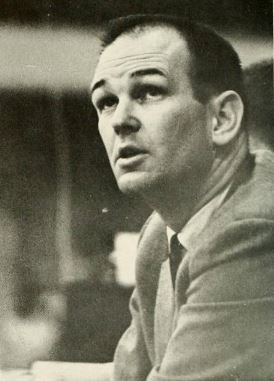
Driesell at Davidson in 1963

Driesell served as the head coach at Davidson from 1960 to 1969. During his tenure his teams won three Southern Conference tournaments and five regular season championships, earning him the Southern Conference Sportswriters Association Coach of the Year award four years running from 1963 to 1966. An excellent recruiter at each of his collegiate coaching stops, Driesell landed Dick Snyder, a second-round selection by the St. Louis Hawks. He cinched his wooing of college prospect Don Davidson by telling him "I'll put your name on the front [of your jersey]". When legendary NC State head coach Everett Case attempted to lure Driesell with an assistant position offer he replied, "Coach, I got a better team than you got. Why would I do that?"

=== Maryland ===
Driesell was hired by the University of Maryland, College Park in 1969. During his introductory press conference on March 19, 1969, he boldly stated that Maryland "has the potential to be the UCLA of the East Coast or I wouldn't be here," referring to the nation's dominant college basketball program in the middle of an unrivaled dynasty. While Driesell fell short of that overreaching goal, he was successful in leading the Terrapins to eight NCAA tournament appearances, a National Invitation Tournament (NIT) championship, two Atlantic Coast Conference regular season championships, and one Atlantic Coast Conference tournament championship. Maryland was ranked as high as No. 2 in the Associated Press rankings for four consecutive seasons from 1972 to 1976, and produced a number of All-Americans, including the No. 2 pick in the 1986 NBA draft, Len Bias.

Driesell coached the Maryland Terrapins from 1969 to 1986. In 1974, he signed a can't miss prospect, 6' 10" center Moses Malone. Instead, Malone opted to join the ABA Utah Stars, becoming the first modern era player to proceed directly from high school into professional basketball; he became a three-time NBA MVP, and Naismith Basketball Hall of Famer. Among other top names during Driesell's Maryland tenure were NBA stars Tom McMillen, Len Elmore, John Lucas, Albert King, Buck Williams, Adrian Branch, and Brad Davis.

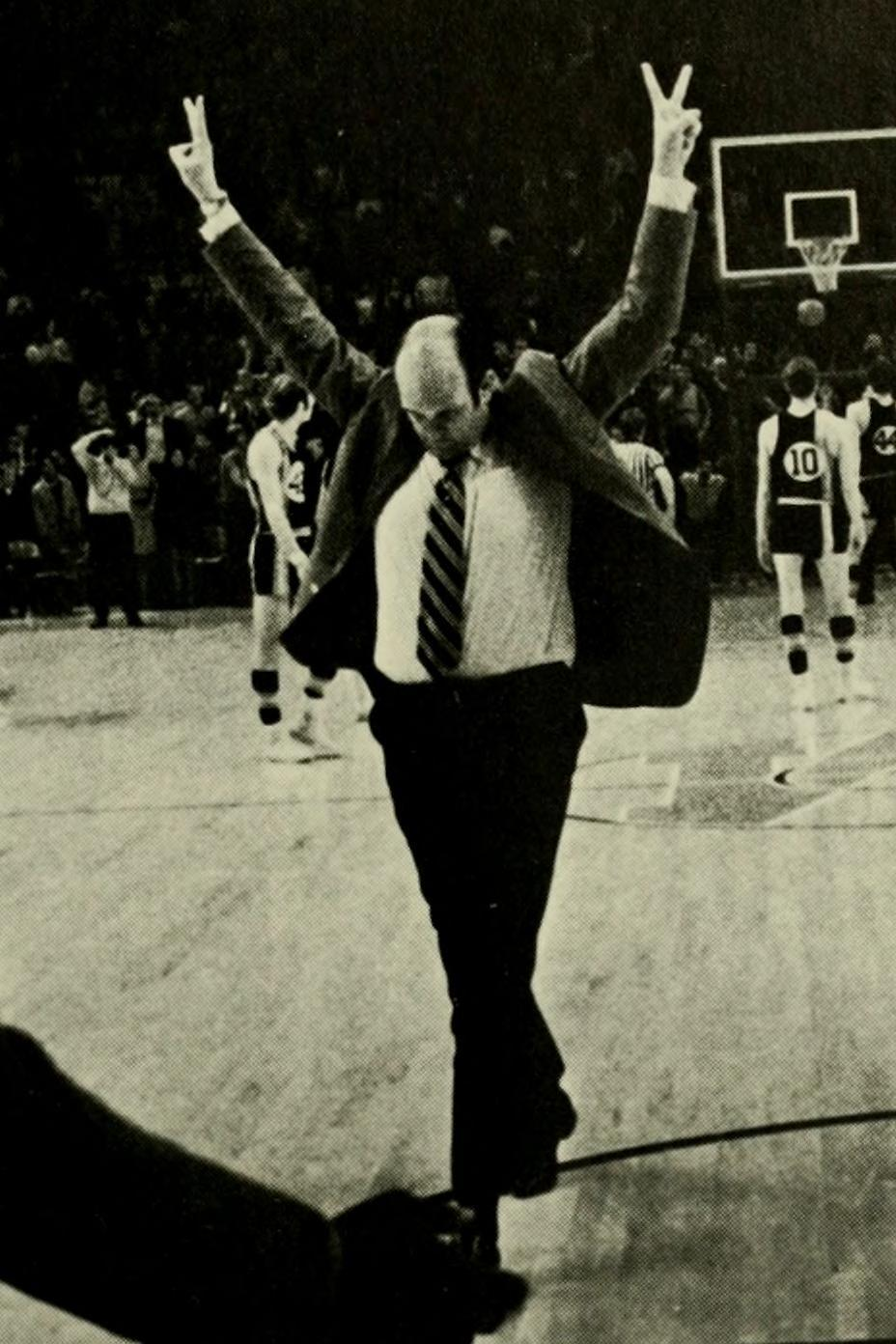
Driesell gives his trademark "V-sign" during his first season at Maryland.

At Maryland, Driesell began the now nationwide tradition of Midnight Madness. According to longstanding NCAA rules, college basketball teams were not permitted to begin practices until October 15. Driesell traditionally began the first practice with a requirement that his players run one mile in six minutes, but found that the players were too fatigued to practice effectively immediately afterwards. At 12:03 a.m. on October 15, 1971, Driesell held a one-mile run at the track around Byrd Stadium, where a crowd of 1,000 fans had gathered after learning of the unorthodox practice session. The event soon became a tradition to build excitement for the basketball team's upcoming season. Midnight Madness has been adopted by many national programs such as UNC, Kansas, Kentucky, Michigan State, and Duke.

In 1972, Maryland defeated Niagara, 100–69 to secure the NIT championship. Driesell said that the season attained the three goals he had set for the program at the time of his hiring: "national prominence", "national ranking", and "a national championship".

On July 12, 1973, Driesell saved the lives of at least ten children from several burning buildings. He and two other men were surf fishing around midnight in Bethany Beach, Delaware when he saw flames coming from a seashore resort. Driesell broke down a door and rescued several children from the fire that eventually destroyed four townhouses. An eyewitness, Prince George's County circuit court Judge Samuel Meloy, said, "Let's face it, Driesell was a hero. There were no injuries and it was a miracle because firemen didn't come for at least 30 minutes." Driesell said, "Don't build me up as any kind of hero. All we did was try to get the kids out. It was just lucky that we were fishing right in front of the houses." For these actions, Driesell was awarded the NCAA Award of Valor.

In the 1974 ACC men's basketball tournament, Maryland was defeated by North Carolina State University in overtime 103–100, eliminating it from participating in that season's NCAA basketball tournament. Many consider it to be one of the greatest college basketball games of all time. NC State eventually went on to win the 1974 National Championship, with Maryland finishing No. 4 in the final Associated Press poll. One great team knocking the other out of the NCAA Tournament prompted its officials to make a landmark decision the next year, expanding its field from 23 to 32 teams, thereby potentially opening the door for more than one team from a conference.

Later in 1974, Maryland represented the United States in the 1974 FIBA Intercontinental Cup that was held in Mexico. There, Driesell successfully led his team to the title after finishing with an unbeaten 5–0 record against Varese from Italy, Vila Nova from Brazil, Real Madrid from Spain, and Panteras de Aguascalientes and Dorados de Chihuahua from Mexico.

He had his detractors despite achieving a relative level of success at Maryland. Clemson head coach Tates Locke famously said about facing Driesell's Terrapins, "Keep me even until the last two minutes and I'll win." Paul Attner of The Washington Post wrote, "...Put him in a situation where players from both teams have equal ability and are prepared just as well, and he falls short much of the time. It is at these moments when it is glaringly apparent Driesell is not among that small number of coaches who can be called 'great'...Once Driesell is placed in a position where pressure decision-making, not hard work, produces a victory, he has problems."

In 1983, a female student at Maryland accused him of making intimidating phone calls to her after she accused Terrapin player Herman Veal of sexual misconduct, which resulted in Veal being declared ineligible to play for the rest of the season.

In 1984, Driesell led the team to the school's second ACC Tournament Championship. In December 1985, the university gave Driesell a ten-year contract extension. On June 19, 1986, Terrapin star Len Bias died in a campus dorm of a cocaine overdose after being drafted by the Boston Celtics. The circumstances surrounding Bias's death threw the University of Maryland and its athletics program into turmoil. A subsequent investigation revealed that Bias was 21 credits short of the graduation requirement despite having attended the university for four full years, exhausting his athletic eligibility; in his final semester, he had done almost no academic work. Driesell allegedly told Bias's friends to remove drugs from the room where Bias took the cocaine that killed him.

On October 29, Driesell resigned as head coach and took a position as an assistant athletic director. Maryland had to pay Driesell for the rest of his 10-year contract as head coach because it could not find any wrongdoing on his part. He also worked as a television analyst during college basketball games. Some members of the media widely described Driesell as a scapegoat of chancellor John B. Slaughter and the university administration.

=== James Madison ===
Driesell resumed his coaching career as the head coach of the James Madison University Dukes in 1988, staying until 1996. His teams captured five Colonial Athletic Association regular season championships, one tournament championship, and an appearance in the NCAA tournament in 1994.

=== Georgia State ===
Driesell then moved to Georgia State, which he led to four Atlantic Sun Conference regular season championships and one tournament championship in six years. He retired from coaching on January 3, 2003, in the middle of his 41st season as a head coach, ranked No. 4 in NCAA Division I wins behind only Dean Smith, Adolph Rupp, and Bob Knight. Driesell is the only basketball coach to win at least 100 games at four different colleges. Driesell led four of his squads to the NCAA Tournament's Elite Eight, but was unable to ever advance to its Final Four. Driesell's final record was 786–394.

== Honors and awards ==
Driesell earned conference Coach of the Year honors at each of his destinations. He was named the Southern Conference Coach of the Year four times at Davidson (1963–1966), twice named the Atlantic Coast Conference Coach of the Year at Maryland (1975 and 1980), twice named the Colonial Athletic Association Coach of the Year at James Madison (1990 and 1992), and once named the Atlantic Sun Conference Coach of the Year at Georgia State (2001).

Driesell was awarded the NCAA Award of Valor for helping save lives from a July 12, 1973, structure fire.

In 1995, Driesell was inducted into the Virginia Sports Hall of Fame. On April 2, 2007, Driesell was inducted as a member of the second class of the National Collegiate Basketball Hall of Fame. The University of Maryland Athletic Hall of Fame inducted Driesell in 2002. On August 13, 2008, he was inducted as a member of the inaugural class of the Hampton Roads Sports Hall of Fame, which honors athletes, coaches, and administrators who made contributions to sports in southeastern Virginia. On May 25, 2011, Driesell was inducted into the Southern Conference Hall of Fame.

In 2003, Georgia State University dedicated their basketball court to Driesell.

On April 2, 2010, the first annual Lefty Driesell Award for the best defensive player in NCAA Division I basketball was bestowed upon its first recipient, Jarvis Varnado of Mississippi State.

In February 2017, the University of Maryland hung a banner in the Xfinity Center to honor his career at the university. Lefty accepted the honor alongside of numerous former players, assistant coaches, and family.

Driesell was nominated numerous times for the Basketball Hall of Fame, receiving wide support from contemporaries. In 2018, Driesell was selected for induction into the Hall of Fame. He was formally inducted on September 7, 2018.

== Personal life and death ==
While a student at Duke University, Driesell eloped with his wife, Joyce on December 14, 1952. The two had met while in the ninth and eighth grades, respectively. The couple had four children. His son, Chuck, is also a basketball coach who served as an assistant for Driesell at James Madison. Chuck stated, "Dad gave me a lot of responsibility, and we worked hard. As a son and as a player, I'm not sure I understood how hard he worked."

Driesell was a Presbyterian, but often attended churches affiliated with other Christian denominations. One of his three daughters, Pam, is a pastor at Trinity Presbyterian Church in Atlanta. In 2003, Driesell retired to Virginia Beach, Virginia. His wife died in 2021. He died in Virginia Beach on February 17, 2024, at the age of 92.

== Head coaching record ==
=== College ===
Record table
Season	Team	Overall	Conference	Standing	Postseason
Davidson Wildcats (Southern Conference) (1960–1969)
1960–61	Davidson	9–14	2–10	9th	
1961–62	Davidson	14–11	5–6	5th	
1962–63	Davidson	20–7	8–3	2nd	
1963–64	Davidson	22–4	9–2	1st	
1964–65	Davidson	24–2	12–0	1st	
1965–66	Davidson	21–7	11–1	1st	NCAA University Division Sweet 16
1966–67	Davidson	15–12	8–4	2nd	
1967–68	Davidson	24–5	9–1	1st	NCAA University Division Elite Eight
1968–69	Davidson	27–3	9–0	1st	NCAA University Division Elite Eight
Davidson:		176–65 (.730)	73–27 (.730)		
Maryland Terrapins (Atlantic Coast Conference) (1969–1986)
1969–70	Maryland	13–13	5–9	6th	
1970–71	Maryland	14–12	5–9	T–6th	
1971–72	Maryland	27–5	8–4	3rd	NIT champions
1972–73	Maryland	23–7	7–5	T–2nd	NCAA University Division Elite Eight
1973–74	Maryland	23–5	9–3	T–2nd	
1974–75	Maryland	24–5	10–2	1st	NCAA Division I Elite Eight
1975–76	Maryland	22–6	7–5	T–2nd	
1976–77	Maryland	19–8	7–5	4th	
1977–78	Maryland	15–13	3–9	T–6th	
1978–79	Maryland	19–11	6–6	4th	NIT Second Round
1979–80	Maryland	24–7	11–3	1st	NCAA Division I Sweet 16
1980–81	Maryland	21–10	8–6	4th	NCAA Division I Second Round
1981–82	Maryland	16–13	5–9	5th	NIT Second Round
1982–83	Maryland	20–10	8–6	T–3rd	NCAA Division I Second Round
1983–84	Maryland	24–8	9–5	2nd	NCAA Division I Sweet 16
1984–85	Maryland	25–12	8–6	T–4th	NCAA Division I Sweet 16
1985–86	Maryland	19–14	6–8	6th	NCAA Division I Second Round
Maryland:		348–159 (.686)	122–100 (.550)		
James Madison Dukes (Colonial Athletic Association) (1988–1997)
1988–89	James Madison	16–14	6–8	T–5th	
1989–90	James Madison	20–11	11–3	1st	NIT First Round
1990–91	James Madison	19–10	12–2	1st	NIT First Round
1991–92	James Madison	21–11	12–2	T–1st	NIT First Round
1992–93	James Madison	21–9	11–3	T–1st	NIT First Round
1993–94	James Madison	20–10	10–4	T–1st	NCAA Division I First Round
1994–95	James Madison	16–13	9–5	3rd	
1995–96	James Madison	10–20	6–10	T–5th	
1996–97	James Madison	16–13	8–8	T–5th	
James Madison:		159–111 (.589)	85–45 (.654)		
Georgia State Panthers (Trans America Athletic Conference / Atlantic Sun Conference) (1997–2003)
1997–98	Georgia State	16–12	11–5	1st (West)	
1998–99	Georgia State	17–13	11–5	3rd	
1999–00	Georgia State	17–12	13–5	T–1st	
2000–01	Georgia State	29–5	16–2	1st	NCAA Division I Second Round
2001–02	Georgia State	20–11	14–6	T–1st	NIT Opening Round
2002–03	Georgia State	4–6			
Georgia State:		103–59 (.636)	65–23 (.739)		
Total:		786–394 (.666)			
National champion Postseason invitational champion Conference regular season champion Conference regular season and conference tournament champion Division regular season champion Division regular season and conference tournament champion Conference tournament champion

== See also ==
- List of college men's basketball coaches with 600 wins
