= 2000–01 Georgia State Panthers men's basketball team =

American college basketball season

2000–01 Georgia State Panthers men's basketball
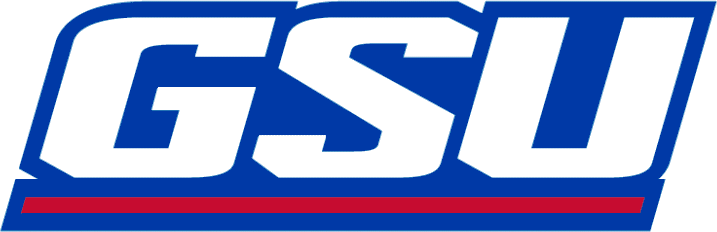

TAAC tournament champions TAAC Regular season champions Nike Festival champions

NCAA tournament, Second round
- Conference: Trans America Athletic Conference
- Record: 29–5 (16–2 TAAC)
- Head coach: Lefty Driesell
- Home arena: GSU Sports Arena

2000–01 Trans America Athletic Conference men's basketball standings
	Conf.				Overall
Team	W		L	PCT	W		L	PCT
Georgia State †	16	–	2	.889	29	–	5	.853
Troy	12	–	6	.667	19	–	12	.613
Jacksonville	11	–	7	.611	18	–	10	.643
Stetson	11	–	7	.611	17	–	12	.586
Samford	11	–	7	.611	15	–	14	.517
Mercer	10	–	8	.556	13	–	15	.464
Jacksonville State	6	–	12	.333	9	–	19	.321
Campbell	5	–	13	.278	7	–	21	.250
Florida Atlantic	5	–	13	.278	7	–	24	.226
Central Florida	3	–	15	.167	8	–	23	.258
† 2001 TAAC tournament winner Rankings from AP Poll

The 2000–01 Georgia State Panthers men's basketball team represented Georgia State University during the 2000–01 NCAA Division I men's basketball season. The team's head coach was Lefty Driesell, and they played their home games at GSU Sports Arena as members of the Trans America Athletic Conference (TAAC). They finished the season 29–5, 16–2 in TAAC play to run away with the regular season title. They won the TAAC tournament to earn a bid to the NCAA tournament – the program's first appearance in 10 years. Playing as No. 11 seed in the West region, the Panthers upset No. 6 seed Wisconsin, 50–49, in the opening round before falling to No. 3 seed and eventual Final Four participant, and Coach Driesell's former team, Maryland, 79–60.

== Roster ==
2000–01 Georgia State Panthers men's basketball team
Players
Coaches

Pos.	#	Name	Height	Weight	Year	Hometown
G		Shernard Long	6 ft 4 in (1.93 m)	190 lb (86 kg)	Sr	Tucker, GA
F		Thomas Terrell	6 ft 7 in (2.01 m)	230 lb (104 kg)	Jr	Brookhaven, MS

Head coach

- Lefty Driesell

Assistant coach(es)

Legend

- (C) Team captain
- (S) Suspended
- (I) Ineligible
- (W) Walk-on
- Injured
- Current redshirt

== Schedule ==
Date time, TV	Rank^{#}	Opponent^{#}	Result	Record	Site city, state
Regular season
Nov 17, 2000*		at Georgia	W 91–79	1–0	Stegeman Coliseum (6,458); Athens, Georgia
Nov 20, 2000*		Savannah State	W 88–45	2–0	GSU Sports Arena (1,064); Atlanta, Georgia
Nov 25, 2000*		at Alabama A&M	W 82–73	3–0	Elmore Gymnasium (757); Huntsville, Alabama
Nov 29, 2000*		Bradley	W 67–54	4–0	GSU Sports Arena (1,022); Atlanta, Georgia
Dec 1, 2000*		Valdosta State	W 83–54	5–0	GSU Sports Arena (932); Atlanta, Georgia
Dec 4, 2000		Samford	W 64–50	6–0 (1–0)	GSU Sports Arena (1,588); Atlanta, Georgia
Dec 6, 2000*		Morris Brown	W 84–70	7–0	GSU Sports Arena (3,014); Atlanta, Georgia
Dec 9, 2000*		at Creighton	L 74–81	7–1	Omaha Civic Auditorium (6,218); Omaha, Nebraska
Dec 21, 2000*		at Hawaii; Nike Festival	W 65–64	8–1	Stan Sheriff Center (5,781); Honolulu, Hawaii
Dec 22, 2000*		vs. UAB; Nike Festival	W 74–63	9–1	Stan Sheriff Center (5,727); Honolulu, Hawaii
Dec 23, 2000*		vs. Cal State Northridge; Nike Festival	W 97–88	10–1	Stan Sheriff Center (5,794); Honolulu, Hawaii
Jan 2, 2001		at Campbell	W 77–67	11–1 (2–0)	Carter Gymnasium (523); Buies Creek, North Carolina
Jan 6, 2001		at Stetson	L 66–71	11–2 (2–1)	Edmunds Center (1,512); DeLand, Florida
Jan 8, 2001		at Jacksonville	W 93–82	12–2 (3–1)	Swisher Gymnasium (1,279); Jacksonville, Florida
Jan 11, 2001		Florida Atlantic	W 96–77	13–2 (4–1)	GSU Sports Arena (1,242); Atlanta, Georgia
Jan 13, 2001		Central Florida	W 97–75	14–2 (5–1)	GSU Sports Arena (1,512); Atlanta, Georgia
Jan 18, 2001		at Mercer	W 87–81	15–2 (6–1)	Porter Gym (1,123); Macon, Georgia
Jan 20, 2001		at Troy	L 67–74	15–3 (6–2)	Trojan Arena (3,271); Troy, Alabama
Jan 23, 2001		Jacksonville State	W 76–52	16–3 (7–2)	GSU Sports Arena (1,145); Atlanta, Georgia
Jan 27, 2001		Mercer	W 86–77	17–3 (8–2)	GSU Sports Arena (2,369); Atlanta, Georgia
Jan 29, 2001		Troy	W 79–75	18–3 (9–2)	GSU Sports Arena (1,183); Atlanta, Georgia
Feb 1, 2001		at Samford	W 73–62	19–3 (10–2)	Pete Hanna Center (4,240); Homewood, Alabama
Feb 3, 2001		at Jacksonville State	W 75–58	20–3 (11–2)	Pete Mathews Coliseum (2,109); Jacksonville, Alabama
Feb 10, 2001		Campbell	W 95–67	21–3 (12–2)	GSU Sports Arena (3,142); Atlanta, Georgia
Feb 12, 2001*		at New Mexico	L 78–91	21–4	University Arena (16,215); Albuquerque, New Mexico
Feb 15, 2001		Jacksonville	W 90–82	22–4 (13–2)	GSU Sports Arena (1,710); Atlanta, Georgia
Feb 17, 2001		Stetson	W 68–65	23–4 (14–2)	GSU Sports Arena (2,746); Atlanta, Georgia
Feb 22, 2001		at Central Florida	W 90–85	24–4 (15–2)	UCF Arena (743); Orlando, Florida
Feb 24, 2001		at Florida Atlantic	W 88–79	25–4 (16–2)	FAU Arena (916); Boca Raton, Florida
TAAC Tournament
Mar 1, 2001*		Florida Atlantic; Quarterfinals	W 96–57	26–4	GSU Sports Arena (2,318); Atlanta, Georgia
Mar 2, 2001*		Samford; Semifinals	W 66–56	27–4	GSU Sports Arena (3,385); Atlanta, Georgia
Mar 3, 2001*		Troy; Championship game	W 79–55	28–4	GSU Sports Arena (4,028); Atlanta, Georgia
NCAA tournament
Mar 15, 2001*	(11 W)	vs. (6 W) No. 25 Wisconsin; First round	W 50–49	29–4	BSU Pavilion (10,824); Boise, Idaho
Mar 17, 2001*	(11 W)	vs. (3 W) No. 11 Maryland; Second round	L 60–79	29–5	BSU Pavilion (11,250); Boise, Idaho
*Non-conference game. ^{#}Rankings from AP Poll. (#) Tournament seedings in parentheses. W=West. All times are in Eastern Time.
