= Cliff Warren =

American basketball player and coach

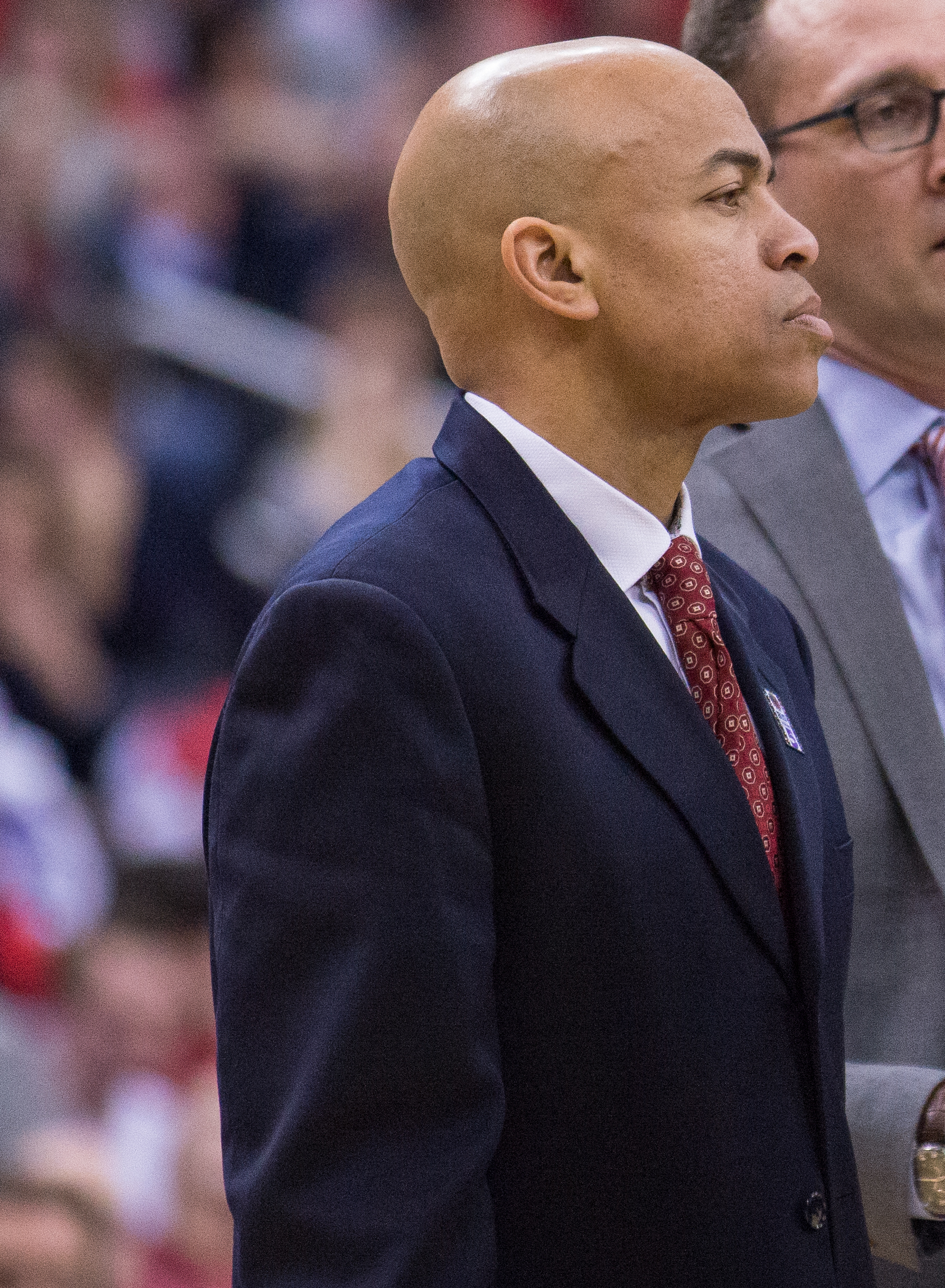

Biographical details
- Born: March 8, 1968 (age 58); Silver Spring, Maryland, U.S.

Playing career
- 1986–1990: Mount St. Mary's

Coaching career (HC unless noted)
- 1994–1997: Mount St. Mary's (asst.)
- 1997–2000: Siena (asst.)
- 2000–2005: Georgia Tech (asst.)
- 2005–2014: Jacksonville
- 2014–2017: Maryland (asst.)
- 2017–2019: UMass (assoc. head)
- 2019–2022: Georgia State (asst.)
- 2022–2024: SMU (asst.)

Head coaching record
- Overall: 126–150 (.457)

Accomplishments and honors

Championships
- 2x Atlantic Sun regular season (2009, 2010)

Awards
- Atlantic Sun Coach of the Year (2009)

Cliff Warren (born March 8, 1968) is an American college basketball coach. He previously served as the head coach for Jacksonville University.

== Playing career ==
Born in Silver Spring, Maryland, Warren played collegiately at Mount St. Mary's University from 1986 to 1990. Warren was a two-year starter for the Mountaineers, where he finished his career ranked in the top five in assists and top 50 in scoring in the school record book. As a senior in 1989–90, he averaged 10.4 points and 5.0 assists per game, while leading The Mount to its first winning season at the Division I level.

== Assistant coach ==
Warren returned to his alma mater in 1994 to take his first coaching job as an assistant under Jim Phelan.

Warren then served from 1997 to 2000 as an assistant at Siena under Paul Hewitt. Warren spent five years under Paul Hewitt at Georgia Tech. Warren was a part of the coaching staff that led the Yellow Jackets to the 2004 national championship game, losing to UConn.

== Jacksonville University ==
Warren was hired as head basketball coach at Jacksonville University in 2005, following the retirement of legendary coach Hugh Durham.

Warren's first year at Jacksonville saw the Dolphins finish the season with only eight healthy players. They struggled to a 1–26 record, the worst performance in school history. In Warren's second year, the Dolphins pulled off the biggest turnaround in the country – improving from one win to a 15–14 record and a third-place finish in the Atlantic Sun Conference.

The Dolphins reached the finals of the 2008 Atlantic Sun men's basketball tournament, losing to Belmont.

The following year, the Dolphins won their first Atlantic Sun Conference regular-season basketball championship. They also made their first trip to the postseason since 1987 as the Dolphins received an automatic bid to the NIT.

In 2009–10, the Dolphins returned to the NIT and faced the top-seeded Arizona State Sun Devils in the first round. Jacksonville knocked off the Sun Devils on a 3-pointer by guard Ben Smith with 1.5 seconds left. It gave the Dolphins their first postseason win in eight games going back to the 1974 NIT. Jacksonville also reached 20 wins for the first time since 1986.

In 2010–11, the Dolphins finished with a 20–12 overall record, earning wins over Auburn and Florida. The Dolphins had back-to-back 20-win seasons for the first time since 1973–74. They were invited to the 2011 CollegeInsider.com Tournament, Jacksonville defeated East Carolina before falling to SMU in the second round.

After a 12–18 season in 2013–14, Warren's contract was not renewed by Athletic Director Brad Edwards. He was 126–150 and 89–79 in the Atlantic Sun Conference in nine seasons at the helm of the Dolphins.

== Team USA ==
Warren was an assistant coach for Team USA at the 2011 FIBA Under-19 World Championship.

== Head coaching record ==
Record table
Season	Team	Overall	Conference	Standing	Postseason
Jacksonville Dolphins (Atlantic Sun Conference) (2005–2014)
2005–06	Jacksonville	1–26	1–19	11th	
2006–07	Jacksonville	15–14	11–7	T–3rd	
2007–08	Jacksonville	18–13	12–4	2nd	
2008–09	Jacksonville	18–14	15–5	1st	NIT 1st Round
2009–10	Jacksonville	20–13	14–6	T–1st	NIT 2nd Round
2010–11	Jacksonville	20–12	13–7	3rd	CIT 2nd Round
2011–12	Jacksonville	8–22	6–12	T–8th	
2012–13	Jacksonville	14–18	9–9	T–4th	
2013–14	Jacksonville	12–18	8–10	7th	
Jacksonville:		126–150 (.457)	89–79 (.530)		
Total:		126–150 (.457)			
National champion Postseason invitational champion Conference regular season champion Conference regular season and conference tournament champion Division regular season champion Division regular season and conference tournament champion Conference tournament champion
