= Jon Cremins =

American basketball coach

Current position
- Title: Head coach
- Team: Georgia State
- Conference: Sun Belt
- Record: 2–3 (.400)

Biographical details
- Education: Valdosta State

Coaching career (HC unless noted)
- 2007–2009: Valdosta State (GA)
- 2009–2010: South Forsyth HS (assistant)
- 2010–2012: Charleston (assistant)
- 2012–2014: Southeast Missouri State (assistant)
- 2014–2015: Kennesaw State (assistant)
- 2015–2017: Spartanburg Methodist
- 2017–2018: USC Upstate (assistant)
- 2018–2020: Georgia Southern (assistant)
- 2020–2024: James Madison (assistant)
- 2024–2026: Vanderbilt (assistant)
- 2026–present: Georgia State

Head coaching record
- Overall: 2–3 (.400) (NCAA); 55–11 (.833) (JUCO)

Jon Cremins is an American basketball coach. He is currently the head coach of the Georgia State Panthers men's basketball team.

== Career ==
Cremins attended Valdosta State University and served as a graduate assistant for the basketball team from 2007 to 2009. After spending a season as an assistant at South Forsyth High School, he was hired as an assistant at Charleston. After two seasons at Charleston, Cremins served as an assistant at Southeast Missouri State and Kennesaw State. In 2015, he was hired as the head coach at Spartanburg Methodist. After compiling at 55–11 record in two seasons, Cremins joined USC Upstate as an assistant. In 2018, he was hired as an assistant at Georgia Southern under head coach Mark Byington. After two seasons at Georgia Southern, Cremins served as an assistant coach at James Madison and Vanderbilt, following Byington.

On April 3, 2026, Cremins was named the next head coach at Georgia State, replacing Jonas Hayes.

== Head coaching record ==
Record table
Season	Team	Overall	Conference	Standing	Postseason
Georgia State (Sun Belt Conference) (2026–present)
2026–27	Georgia State	2–3	0–0		
Georgia State:		2–3 (.400)	0–0 (–)		
Total:		2–3 (.400)			
National champion Postseason invitational champion Conference regular season champion Conference regular season and conference tournament champion Division regular season champion Division regular season and conference tournament champion Conference tournament champion

== Personal life ==
Cremins is the nephew of former head coach Bobby Cremins.
