= Frank Kerns =

American basketball coach

Biographical details
- Born: May 21, 1933; Cumberland, Maryland, U.S.
- Died: August 3, 2015 (aged 82); Statesboro, Georgia, U.S.
- Education: University of Alabama

Coaching career (HC unless noted)
- 1961–1964: Clarke County HS
- 1965–1968: Fairhope HS
- 1969–1970: McGill Institute
- 1971–1979: Spring Hill College
- 1979–1981: Chattanooga (assistant)
- 1981–1994: Georgia Southern

Head coaching record
- Overall: 244–132 (NCAA); 100–103 (NAIA)
- Tournaments: 0–3 (NCAA); 0–2 (NIT)

Accomplishments and honors

Championships
- 3 TAAC tournament (1983, 1987, 1992); 4 TAAC regular season (1985, 1988, 1989, 1992)

Awards
- 4× TAAC Coach of the Year (1983, 1987, 1988, 1992); NAIA Coach of the Year (1975)

Franklin Phillip "Frank" Kerns (May 21, 1933 – August 3, 2015) was an American basketball coach. He coached Georgia Southern from 1981 to 1994.

A native of Cumberland, Maryland, Kerns served in the Marine Corps during the Korean War. He later earned a degree in physical education from the University of Alabama. Kerns served as coach of Georgia Southern from 1982 to 1994, compiling a record of 244–132. A four-time Trans America Athletic Conference Coach of the Year, Kerns coached the Eagles to NCAA Tournaments in 1983, 1987, and 1992. The Eagles also reached the National Invitation Tournament in 1988 and 1989 under the direction of Kerns. He later coached in China for a year and in Austria for six years. He then coached at Bulloch Academy for several years. Kerns was a color analyst for Georgia Southern Radio for eight years.

Kerns died on August 3, 2015, at East Georgia Regional Medical Center in Statesboro, Georgia. He was 82 years old and had a brief illness. He was buried on August 6, 2015.

== Head coaching record ==
=== NAIA ===
Record table
Season	Team	Overall	Conference	Standing	Postseason
Spring Hill Badgers (Alabama Collegiate Conference) (1971–1973)
1971–72	Spring Hill	10–12			
1972–73	Spring Hill	6–19			
Spring Hill Badgers (Southern States Conference) (1973–1981)
1973–74	Spring Hill	14–11	8–4		
1974–75	Spring Hill	20–7	12–2	1st	
1975–76	Spring Hill	13–14	5–9		
1976–77	Spring Hill	18–10	10–6		
1977–78	Spring Hill	12–16	8–10		
1978–79	Spring Hill	7–18	7–11		
Spring Hill:		100–103 (.493)	50–42 (.543)		
Total:		100–103 (.493)			
National champion Postseason invitational champion Conference regular season champion Conference regular season and conference tournament champion Division regular season champion Division regular season and conference tournament champion Conference tournament champion

=== NCAA ===
Record table
Season	Team	Overall	Conference	Standing	Postseason
Georgia Southern (Trans American Athletic Conference) (1982–1992)
1981–82	Georgia Southern	14–13	8–8	T–5th	
1982–83	Georgia Southern	18–12	8–6	T–3rd	NCAA Division I Preliminary Round
1983–84	Georgia Southern	16–12	8–6	3rd	
1984–85	Georgia Southern	24–5	11–3	1st	
1985–86	Georgia Southern	15–13	6–8	T–5th	
1986–87	Georgia Southern	20–11	12–6	4th	NCAA Division I First Round
1987–88	Georgia Southern	24–7	15–3	T–1st	NIT First Round
1988–89	Georgia Southern	23–6	16–2	1st	NIT First Round
1989–90	Georgia Southern	17–11	11–5	4th	
1990–91	Georgia Southern	14–13	9–5	T–3rd	
1991–92	Georgia Southern	25–6	13–1	1st	NCAA Division I First Round
Georgia Southern (Southern Conference) (1993–1995)
1992–93	Georgia Southern	19–9	12–6	T–2nd	
1993–94	Georgia Southern	14–14	9–9	5th	
1994–95	Georgia Southern	1–0 (Note: Kerns resigned following allegations of a recruiting violation.)	0–0		
Georgia Southern:		244–132 (.649)	138–68 (.670)		
Total:		244–132 (.649)			
National champion Postseason invitational champion Conference regular season champion Conference regular season and conference tournament champion Division regular season champion Division regular season and conference tournament champion Conference tournament champion
