= 1983 TAAC men's basketball tournament =

- Classification: Division I
- Season: 1982–83
- Teams: 8
- Site: Barton Coliseum; Little Rock, AR
- Champions: Georgia Southern (1st title)
- Winning coach: Frank Kerns (1st title)
- MVP: Donald Wilson (Arkansas–Little Rock)
- TAAC men's basketball tournaments

1982–83 Trans America Athletic Conference men's basketball standings
	Conf.				Overall
Team	W		L	PCT	W		L	PCT
Arkansas–Little Rock	12	–	2	.857	23	–	6	.793
Houston Baptist	10	–	4	.714	20	–	9	.690
Georgia Southern †	8	–	6	.571	18	–	12	.600
Centenary	8	–	6	.571	16	–	13	.552
Mercer	6	–	8	.429	13	–	15	.464
Samford	6	–	8	.429	13	–	15	.464
Northwestern State	5	–	9	.357	9	–	19	.321
Hardin–Simmons	1	–	13	.071	3	–	25	.107
Nicholls State*	0	–	0	–	16	–	12	.571
† 1983 TAAC tournament winner *Provisional member; played no conference games. Rankings from AP Poll

The 1983 Trans America Athletic Conference men's basketball tournament (now known as the ASUN men's basketball tournament) was held March 10–12, 1983 at Barton Coliseum in Little Rock, Arkansas.

Georgia Southern upset top-seeded Arkansas–Little Rock in the championship game, 68–67, to win their first TAAC/Atlantic Sun men's basketball tournament. The Eagles, in turn, received an automatic bid to the 1983 NCAA tournament, their first Division I tournament appearance.

Northeast Louisiana departed the TAAC for the Southland Conference prior to the season and were replaced with Nicholls State.

== Bracket ==
Quarterfinals; Thursday, March 10
1	Arkansas–Little Rock	74
8	Hardin–Simmons	57
5	Mercer	95
4	Centenary	96
3	Georgia Southern	58
6	Samford	57
7	Northwestern State	65
2	Houston Baptist	80

Semifinals; Friday, March 11
1	Arkansas–Little Rock	88
4	Centenary	83
3	Georgia Southern	58
2	Houston Baptist	55

Championship; Saturday, March 12
1	Arkansas–Little Rock	67
3	Georgia Southern	68
