= 1982–83 Georgia Southern Eagles men's basketball team =

American college basketball season

1982–83 Georgia Southern Eagles men's basketball

TAAC tournament champion

NCAA tournament
- Conference: Trans America Athletic Conference
- Record: 18–12 (8–6 TAAC)
- Head coach: Frank Kerns (1st season)
- Home arena: Hanner Fieldhouse

1982–83 Trans America Athletic Conference men's basketball standings
	Conf.				Overall
Team	W		L	PCT	W		L	PCT
Arkansas–Little Rock	12	–	2	.857	23	–	6	.793
Houston Baptist	10	–	4	.714	20	–	9	.690
Georgia Southern †	8	–	6	.571	18	–	12	.600
Centenary	8	–	6	.571	16	–	13	.552
Mercer	6	–	8	.429	13	–	15	.464
Samford	6	–	8	.429	13	–	15	.464
Northwestern State	5	–	9	.357	9	–	19	.321
Hardin–Simmons	1	–	13	.071	3	–	25	.107
Nicholls State*	0	–	0	–	16	–	12	.571
† 1983 TAAC tournament winner *Provisional member; played no conference games. Rankings from AP Poll

The 1982–83 Georgia Southern Eagles men's basketball team represented Georgia Southern University during the 1982–83 NCAA Division I men's basketball season. The Eagles, led by first year head coach Frank Kerns, played their home games at Hanner Fieldhouse in Statesboro, Georgia as members of the Trans America Athletic Conference. The team finished third in the regular season conference standings and won the TAAC tournament to earn an automatic bid to the NCAA tournament – the first appearance in program history. As one of two No. 12 seeds in the Mideast region, the Eagles lost in the Play-in round to Robert Morris, 64–54 to finish with a 18–12 record (8–6 TAAC).

== Roster ==
1982–83 Georgia Southern Eagles men's basketball team
Players
Coaches

Pos.	#	Name	Height	Weight	Year	Hometown
G		Eric Hightower	6 ft 2 in (1.88 m)	—
F		Dennis Murphy	6 ft 5 in (1.96 m)	—

Head coach

- Frank Kerns

Assistant coach(es)

Legend

- (C) Team captain
- (S) Suspended
- (I) Ineligible
- (W) Walk-on
- Injured
- Current redshirt

Roster

== Schedule and results ==
Date time, TV	Rank^{#}	Opponent^{#}	Result	Record	Site (attendance) city, state
Non-conference Regular season
Dec 17, 1982*		vs. No. 20 West Virginia	L 58–85	0–4	Charleston Civic Center; Charleston, West Virginia
Dec 18, 1982*		vs. Robert Morris	W 66–63	1–4	
Dec 22, 1982*		vs. Georgia	L 55–57	1–5	Martin Luther King Arena; Savannah, Georgia
TAAC Regular season
TAAC tournament
Mar 10, 1983*		Samford	W 58–57	16–11	Hanner Fieldhouse; Statesboro, Georgia
Mar 11, 1983*		vs. Houston Baptist; Semifinals	W 58–55	17–11	Barton Coliseum; Little Rock, Arkansas
Mar 12, 1983*		at Arkansas–Little Rock; Championship game	W 68–67	18–11	Barton Coliseum; Little Rock, Arkansas
NCAA tournament
Mar 15, 1983*	(12 ME)	vs. (12 ME) Robert Morris; Play-in Game	L 54–64	18–12	University of Dayton Arena; Dayton, Ohio
*Non-conference game. ^{#}Rankings from AP poll. (#) Tournament seedings in parentheses. ME=Mideast. All times are in Eastern.
