= 1991 TAAC men's basketball tournament =

- Classification: Division I
- Season: 1990–91
- Teams: 8
- Site: Edmunds Center; DeLand, FL
- Champions: Georgia State (1st title)
- Winning coach: Bob Reinhart (1st title)
- MVP: Chris Collier (Georgia State)
- TAAC men's basketball tournaments

1990–91 Trans America Athletic Conference men's basketball standings
| | Conf. | | | | Overall |
| Team | W | | L | PCT | W | | L | PCT |
|---|---|---|---|---|---|---|---|---|
| UTSA | 12 | – | 2 | .857 | 21 | – | 8 | .724 |
| Centenary | 10 | – | 4 | .714 | 17 | – | 12 | .586 |
| Georgia Southern | 9 | – | 5 | .643 | 14 | – | 13 | .519 |
| Stetson | 9 | – | 5 | .643 | 15 | – | 16 | .484 |
| Georgia State † | 7 | – | 7 | .500 | 16 | – | 15 | .516 |
| Arkansas–Little Rock | 6 | – | 8 | .429 | 10 | – | 20 | .333 |
| Samford | 2 | – | 12 | .143 | 6 | – | 22 | .214 |
| Mercer | 1 | – | 13 | .071 | 2 | – | 25 | .074 |
† 1991 TAAC tournament winner Rankings from AP Poll

The 1991 Trans America Athletic Conference men's basketball tournament (now known as the ASUN men's basketball tournament) was held March 5–7 at the Edmunds Center in DeLand, Florida.

Georgia State defeated Arkansas–Little Rock in the championship game, 80–60, to win their first TAAC/Atlantic Sun men's basketball tournament.

The Panthers, therefore, received the TAAC's automatic bid to the 1991 NCAA tournament, their first Division I tournament appearance.

Hardin–Simmons departed the TAAC for Division III prior to the season, leaving the conference membership at eight. As such, the TAAC tournament returned to its old format where all of the league's members participated.

== Bracket ==
Quarterfinals; Tuesday, March 5
1 | Texas–San Antonio | 77
8 | Mercer | 55
5 | Georgia State | 70
4 | Stetson | 64
3 | Georgia Southern | 65
6 | Arkansas–Little Rock | 70
7 | Samford | 82
2 | Centenary (LA) | 93

Semifinals; Wednesday, March 6
1 | Texas–San Antonio | 84
5 | Georgia State | 94
6 | Arkansas–Little Rock | 80
2 | Centenary (LA) | 73

Championship; Thursday, March 7
5 | Georgia State | 80
6 | Arkansas–Little Rock | 60
