= 1990–91 Georgia State Panthers men's basketball team =

American college basketball season

1990–91 Georgia State Panthers men's basketball
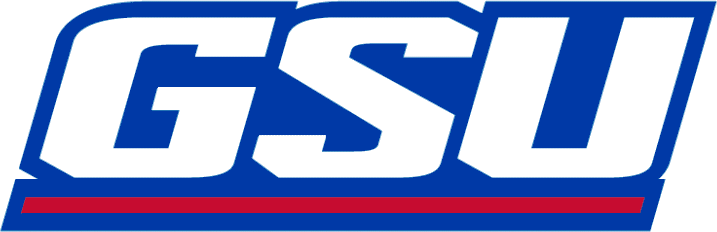

TAAC tournament champion

NCAA tournament
- Conference: Trans America Athletic Conference
- Record: 16–15 (7–7 TAAC)
- Head coach: Bob Reinhart
- Home arena: GSU Sports Arena

1990–91 Trans America Athletic Conference men's basketball standings
	Conf.				Overall
Team	W		L	PCT	W		L	PCT
UTSA	12	–	2	.857	21	–	8	.724
Centenary	10	–	4	.714	17	–	12	.586
Georgia Southern	9	–	5	.643	14	–	13	.519
Stetson	9	–	5	.643	15	–	16	.484
Georgia State †	7	–	7	.500	16	–	15	.516
Arkansas–Little Rock	6	–	8	.429	10	–	20	.333
Samford	2	–	12	.143	6	–	22	.214
Mercer	1	–	13	.071	2	–	25	.074
† 1991 TAAC tournament winner Rankings from AP Poll

The 1990–91 Georgia State Panthers men's basketball team represented Georgia State University during the 1990–91 NCAA Division I men's basketball season. The team's head coach was Bob Reinhart in first season at GSU. They played their home games at GSU Sports Arena and are members of the Trans America Athletic Conference (TAAC). They finished the season 16–15, 7–7 in TAAC play to finish in fifth place. They won the TAAC tournament to earn a bid to the 1991 NCAA tournament as No. 16 seed in the Southeast region. The Panthers were beaten in the opening round by eventual Final Four participant Arkansas, 117–76.

== Roster ==
1990–91 Georgia State Panthers men's basketball team
Players
Coaches

Pos.	#	Name	Height	Weight	Year	Hometown
G	3	Courtney Brooks	—	—		Atlanta, GA
G	12	Mark Thompson	—	—		Dalton, GA
G	13	Corey Gauff	—	—		Delray Beach, FL
G	14	Matt O'Brien	—	—		Decatur, GA
G	15	Sam Wilder	—	—		Chamblee, GA
F	20	Chris Collier	—	—		Atlanta, GA
F	21	Mike Nalls	—	—		Columbus, GA
G	31	Garrett Coley	—	—		Irwinton, GA
G/F	32	Phillip Luckydo	—	—		Little Rock, AR
G	33	Esell Monroe	—	—		College Park, GA
F/C	34	Zavian Smith	—	—		Thomson, GA
G	42	Matt Peterson	—	—		Norcross, GA
C	51	Arte Cole	—	—		Gibson, GA

Head coach

- Bob Reinhart

Assistant coach(es)

- Carter Wilson

Legend

- (C) Team captain
- (S) Suspended
- (I) Ineligible
- (W) Walk-on
- Injured
- Current redshirt

== Schedule ==
Date time, TV	Rank^{#}	Opponent^{#}	Result	Record	Site city, state
Regular season
November 24, 1990*		The Citadel	W 85–61	1–0	GSU Sports Arena (1,000); Atlanta, GA
November 26, 1990*		at Auburn	L 65–83	1–1	Beard–Eaves–Memorial Coliseum (5,304); Auburn, AL
December 3, 1990*		FIU	W 99–82	2–1	GSU Sports Arena (1,055); Atlanta, GA
December 5, 1990*		Florida A&M	L 71–76	2–2	Jake Gaither Gymnasium (3,487); Tallahassee, FL
December 8, 1990*		Stephen F. Austin	W 65–60	3–2	William R. Johnson Coliseum (1,244); Nacogdoches, TX
December 10, 1990*		Northern Arizona	L 74–84	3–3	Walkup Skydome (412); Flagstaff, AZ
December 13, 1990*		Augusta State	W 72–71	4–3	GSU Sports Arena (1,000); Atlanta, GA
December 15, 1990*		Texas–Arlington	L 104–113	4–4	GSU Sports Arena (1,000); Atlanta, GA
December 22, 1990*		Northern Arizona	W 92–76	5–4	GSU Sports Arena (1,000); Atlanta, GA
January 2, 1991*		Butler	L 96–106	5–5	GSU Sports Arena (1,000); Atlanta, GA
January 5, 1991*		Stephen F. Austin	W 73–66	6–5	GSU Sports Arena (1,215); Atlanta, GA
January 10, 1991		Arkansas–Little Rock	L 67–75	6–6	Barton Coliseum (2,002); Little Rock, AR
January 14, 1991		Samford	W 85–75	7–6	Seibert Hall (1,306); Homewood, AL
January 17, 1991		Georgia Southern	W 73–72	8–6	GSU Sports Arena (2,100); Atlanta, GA
January 19, 1991		Stetson	L 69–84	8–7	GSU Sports Arena (1,780); Atlanta, GA
January 23, 1991*		The Citadel	L 78–86	8–8	McAlister Field House (680); Charleston, SC
January 26, 1991		Mercer	W 98–61	9–8	GSU Sports Arena (3,423); Atlanta, GA
January 31, 1991		UTSA	L 72–85	9–9	Convocation Center (1,502); San Antonio, TX
February 2, 1991		Centenary	L 74–79	9–10	Gold Dome (2,019); Shreveport, LA
February 7, 1991		Arkansas–Little Rock	L 66–81	9–11	GSU Sports Arena (1,125); Atlanta, GA
February 9, 1991		Samford	W 77–59	10–11	GSU Sports Arena (1,020); Atlanta, GA
February 14, 1991		Georgia Southern	W 90–86	11–11	Hanner Fieldhouse (1,009); Statesboro, GA
February 16, 1991		Stetson	L 61–70	11–12	Edmunds Center (2,639); DeLand, FL
February 19, 1991*		Florida A&M	L 94–96	11–13	GSU Sports Arena (1,533); Atlanta, GA
February 25, 1991		Mercer	W 55–50	12–13	Macon Coliseum (475); Macon, GA
February 28, 1991		UTSA	L 78–85	12–14	GSU Sports Arena (1,020); Atlanta, GA
March 2, 1991		Centenary	W 99–80	13–14	GSU Sports Arena (1,520); Atlanta, GA
TAAC Tournament
March 5, 1991	(5)	at (4) Stetson; Quarterfinal	W 70–64	14–14	Edmunds Center (3,254); DeLand, FL
March 6, 1991	(5)	vs. (1) UTSA; Semifinal	W 94–84	15–14	Edmunds Center (512); DeLand, FL
March 7, 1991	(5)	vs. (6) Arkansas–Little Rock; Championship Game	W 80–60	16–14	Edmunds Center (3,105); DeLand, FL
NCAA tournament
March 15, 1991*	(16 SE)	vs. (1 SE) No. 2 Arkansas; First Round	L 76–117	16–15	The Omni (13,586); Atlanta, GA
*Non-conference game. ^{#}Rankings from AP Poll. (#) Tournament seedings in parentheses. SE=Southeast. All times are in Eastern Time.
