= 2001 TAAC men's basketball tournament =

- Classification: Division I
- Season: 2000–01
- Teams: 10
- Site: GSU Sports Arena; Atlanta, GA
- Champions: Georgia State (2nd title)
- Winning coach: Lefty Driesell (1st title)
- MVP: Thomas Terrell (Georgia State)
- TAAC men's basketball tournaments

2000–01 Trans America Athletic Conference men's basketball standings
	Conf.				Overall
Team	W		L	PCT	W		L	PCT
Georgia State †	16	–	2	.889	29	–	5	.853
Troy	12	–	6	.667	19	–	12	.613
Jacksonville	11	–	7	.611	18	–	10	.643
Stetson	11	–	7	.611	17	–	12	.586
Samford	11	–	7	.611	15	–	14	.517
Mercer	10	–	8	.556	13	–	15	.464
Jacksonville State	6	–	12	.333	9	–	19	.321
Campbell	5	–	13	.278	7	–	21	.250
Florida Atlantic	5	–	13	.278	7	–	24	.226
Central Florida	3	–	15	.167	8	–	23	.258
† 2001 TAAC tournament winner Rankings from AP Poll

The 2001 Trans America Athletic Conference men's basketball tournament (now known as the ASUN men's basketball tournament) was held February 28 – March 3 at the GSU Sports Arena in Atlanta, Georgia. This was the final tournament before the TAAC changed its name to its current moniker, the Atlantic Sun.

Top-seeded Georgia State defeated Troy State in the championship game, 79–55, to win their second TAAC/Atlantic Sun men's basketball tournament.

The Panthers, therefore, received the TAAC's automatic bid to the 2001 NCAA tournament.

== Format ==
With no teams joining or leaving the conference, the field remained set at ten. All teams were eligible for the tournament, seeded based on their conference records.

== Bracket ==
First round Wednesday, February 28
9	Florida Atlantic	70
8	Campbell	65
7	Jacksonville State	57
10	UCF	100

Quarterfinals; Thursday, March 1
1	Georgia State	96
9	Florida Atlantic	57
5	Jacksonville	41
4	Samford	44
3	Stetson	71
6	Mercer	67
2	Troy State	89
10	UCF	68

Semifinals; Friday, March 2
1	Georgia State	66
4	Samford	56
3	Stetson	69
2	Troy State	78

Championship; Saturday, March 3
1	Georgia State	79
2	Troy State	55
