= D'Marcus Simonds =

American basketball player (born 1997)

Personal information
- Born: October 20, 1997 (age 29) Atlanta, Georgia, U.S.
- Listed height: 6 ft 3 in (1.91 m)
- Listed weight: 200 lb (91 kg)

Career information
- High school: Gainesville (Gainesville, Georgia)
- College: Georgia State (2016–2019)
- NBA draft: 2019: undrafted
- Playing career: 2019–2019
- Position: Shooting guard

Career highlights
- AP Honorable Mention All-American (2018); Sun Belt Player of the Year (2018); 2× First-team All-Sun Belt (2018, 2019); Sun Belt Freshman of the Year (2017)

D'Marcus Simonds (born October 20, 1997) is an American basketball player. He played college basketball for Georgia State. He was named the 2017–18 Sun Belt Conference Player of the Year as well as the Georgia Men’s College Co-Player of the Year.

== Prep career ==
Simonds played his junior and senior seasons for Gainesville. His senior season, he averaged 25 points per game. His team was undefeated in region play and advanced to the second round of the state playoffs. Simonds was recognized with all-region and all-state honors. Coming out of high school, Simonds was No. 72 in the country in the ESPN 100 and was a four-star recruit. He originally committed to Mississippi State, but eventually decided to stay closer to his family and flipped his commitment to Georgia State.

== College career ==
=== Freshman season (2016–17) ===
Pre season, he earned the Cancún Challenge Mayan Division MVP after scoring 39 points for the Panthers at the event. In late January, after tying a then career-high 26 points at Troy—along with six rebounds—and putting up 21 points at South Alabama, he was named College Sports Madness National Mid-Major Player of the Week.

Simonds was named Sun Belt Freshman of the Year in his inaugural season at Georgia State.

=== Sophomore season (2017–18) ===
In the pre season, he led Georgia State with 30 points in a win over cross-town foe, Georgia Tech. He was twice named Sun Belt player of the week. On February 10, he scored a career-high 39 points and grabbed 12 rebounds in a win versus Louisiana-Monroe. After scoring 27 points to lead the Panthers to a second Sun Belt Conference Tournament title in four seasons, he was named the SBC Tournament MVP. In the Panthers' First Round game in the NCAA tournament against 2-seed Cincinnati, Simonds scored the team's first 16 points– finishing with 27 along with 4 rebounds. Despite an early lead, GSU was ultimately eliminated by the Bearcats.

Simonds earned Sun Belt Player of the Year honors at the end of the regular season. He was also named the Men's Georgia College Co-Player of the Year by the Atlanta Tipoff Club. D'Marcus was also named to the Lou Henson All-America team and a finalist for the Lou Henson Award.

It was uncertain whether the sophomore guard would return for another year at GSU or decide to turn pro. On March 4, Simonds officially announced he would remain at Georgia State for a third season. In a statement he explained his motivation to return: “Although we made the NCAA tournament, we also feel as though we have something left to prove. My teammates are more like my brothers and we want to take Georgia State further than it has ever been before and I want to be a part of that.”

=== Junior season (2018–19) ===
As a junior, Simonds averaged 18.4 points, 5.0 rebounds, 3.6 assists, 1.3 steals and 1.0 block per game. He was named to the First Team All-Sun Belt as well as the Tournament Team. After the season he declared for the 2019 NBA draft.

=== College statistics ===
Season averages
| Season | Team | G | MIN | PTS | REB | AST | STL | FG% | 3P% | FT% | AST/TO |
|---|---|---|---|---|---|---|---|---|---|---|---|
| 2016–17 | Georgia State | 29 | 27.1 | 13.4 | 4 | 2 | 1.3 | .535 | .356 | .719 | 0.75 |
| 2017–18 | Georgia State | 35 | 34.9 | 21.2 | 5.7 | 4.4 | 1.7 | .461 | .292 | .702 | 1.2 |
| Career | | 64 | 31 | 17.3 | 4.9 | 3.2 | 1.5 | .498 | .324 | .711 | 0.98 |

=== College records ===
- Georgia State single-season leader in points (742, 2017–18)
- Georgia State single-season leader in field goals made (277, 2017–18)
- Georgia State career leader in total field goals made (589, set February 13, 2019)

== Personal life ==
D'Marcus Simonds is the son of Wanda and Mark Simonds, and has two brothers and one sister.
