= Rodney Hamilton =

American basketball player and coach (born 1975)

Austin Peay Governors
- Title: Associate Head Coach
- League: ASUN Conference

Personal information
- Born: 1975 (age 50–51) Memphis, Tennessee
- Listed height: 5 ft 9 in (1.75 m)

Career information
- High school: Whitehaven (Memphis, Tennessee)
- College: Georgia State (1994–1998)
- NBA draft: 1998: undrafted
- Playing career: 1998–2001
- Position: Point guard

Career history

Playing
- 1998–1999: 08 Stockholm
- 1999–2000: Fribourg
- 2000–2001: M7 Basket
- 2001: Honvéd

Coaching
- 2001–2005: Westside HS
- 2005–2007: Crichton College (assistant)
- 2007–2009: Southeast Missouri State (assistant)
- 2009–2012: Indiana Tech (women's)
- 2012–2018: Tennessee State (assistant)
- 2018–2023: Memphis (DBO)
- 2023–present: Austin Peay (associate HC)

Career highlights
- LNBA All-Star (2000); Swedish-Finnish League champion (1999); 2× First-team All-Atlantic Sun (1997, 1998)

Rodney Hamilton (born 1975) is an American former professional basketball player and currently the associate head coach at Austin Peay State University. He played four seasons of college basketball for Georgia State University before playing professionally in Europe for three seasons. His first head coaching gig came following his retirement in 2001 at Westside High School in his hometown of Memphis, Tennessee. He then became an assistant coach at Crichton College, Southeast Missouri State University, and head coach of the Indiana Tech women's basketball team before joining Tennessee State in 2012.

== Playing career ==
=== College ===
Hamilton played collegiately at Georgia State University in Atlanta, Georgia, where he lettered all four seasons he played. Hamilton is the Panthers' all-time leader in scoring, assists and steals. He was a two-time All-Atlantic Sun Conference selection, earning first team and ASC All-Tournament honors in 1998. He was named second team All-ASC in 1997 and garnered Academic All-ASC both years. Hamilton is the only player in school history to start more than 100 games and was the first GSU player to have his jersey number retired.

Over his standout career, he recorded 1,515 points, 535 assists and 212 steals, all GSU records. He is also the most accurate free throw shooter in school history at 83.8%. Hamilton was honored by the CAA on January 30, 2007 as a CAA Legend. The conference hands out the honor once per season to a men's basketball player that exemplifies the CAA.

=== Professional ===
After his collegiate playing career, Hamilton participated in the Atlanta Hawks' free agent camp in 1998. He went on to play professionally for three seasons in Sweden, Switzerland and Hungary.

== Coaching career ==
=== Westside High School ===
From 2001 to 2005, Hamilton coached at Westside High School in his hometown of Memphis. The Wildcats played in the 15 AA District (MIAA) Memphis Interscholastic Athletic Association.

=== Crichton College ===
From 2005 to 2007, Hamilton served as an assistant and associate head coach at Crichton College in Memphis. During his first season at Crichton in 2005–06, the men's basketball team enjoyed a 15-game turnaround from the previous season. They were able to finish with an 18–12 overall record, third in the TranSouth Conference and was ranked as high as No. 13 in the NAIA Top 25 National Ranking.

In Hamilton's second season, the 2006–07 Crichton team advanced to the NAIA Elite Eight in the National Tournament held in Kansas City, Missouri, after winning the TranSouth Conference regular season and tournament titles. The team finished with a 28–8 regular and post-season record and ended 15–3 in the TranSouth Conference. Crichton was nationally ranked during the course of the year being as No. 21, 22 and 25. After completing a 13-game winning streak, the Comets finished No. 7 in the nation in the NAIA national poll.

=== Southeast Missouri State ===
From 2007 to 2009, Hamilton served as an assistant men's basketball coach at Southeast Missouri State University. His primary duties for the Redhawks included serving as the program's recruiting coordinator as well as scheduling, player development, scouting and all other facets of the program.

=== Indiana Tech ===
In 2009, Hamilton was named head coach of the women's basketball program at Indiana Tech, an NAIA institution in Fort Wayne, Indiana. He coached at Indiana Tech for three seasons and under his tutelage, the team tied for the most wins during the 2011–12 season for only the third time since 2003.

=== Tennessee State ===
In 2012, Hamilton joined the coaching staff of the Tennessee State Tigers basketball team with the roles of recruiting, player development, scouting and academic assistance.

=== Memphis ===
On April 6, 2018, Hamilton returned to his hometown to become the director of operations for the Memphis University men's basketball team.

=== Austin Peay ===
On March 30, 2023, Hamilton was named associate head coach at Austin Peay under head coach Corey Gipson.
