= Georgia State Panthers men's basketball =

Men's collegiate basketball team

2026–27 Georgia State Panthers men's basketball team
- University: Georgia State University
- Head coach: Jon Cremins (1st season)
- Location: Atlanta, Georgia
- Arena: Georgia State Convocation Center (capacity: 7,300)
- Conference: Sun Belt Conference
- Nickname: Panthers
- Colors: Blue and white

NCAA Division I tournament round of 32
- 2001, 2015

NCAA Division I tournament appearances
- 1991, 2001, 2015, 2018, 2019, 2022

Conference tournament champions
- 1991, 2001, 2015, 2018, 2019, 2022

Conference regular-season champions
- 2000, 2001, 2002, 2014, 2015, 2019

Conference division champions
- 1998, 2021

Uniforms
Home	Away	Alternate

The Georgia State Panthers men's basketball team represents Georgia State University and competes in the Sun Belt Conference of NCAA Division I. The Panthers play at the Georgia State Convocation Center in Atlanta, Georgia, United States. The team is currently coached by Jon Cremins. Georgia State has appeared six times in the NCAA Division I men's basketball tournament, most recently in 2022.

== Facilities ==
=== GSU Convocation Center ===
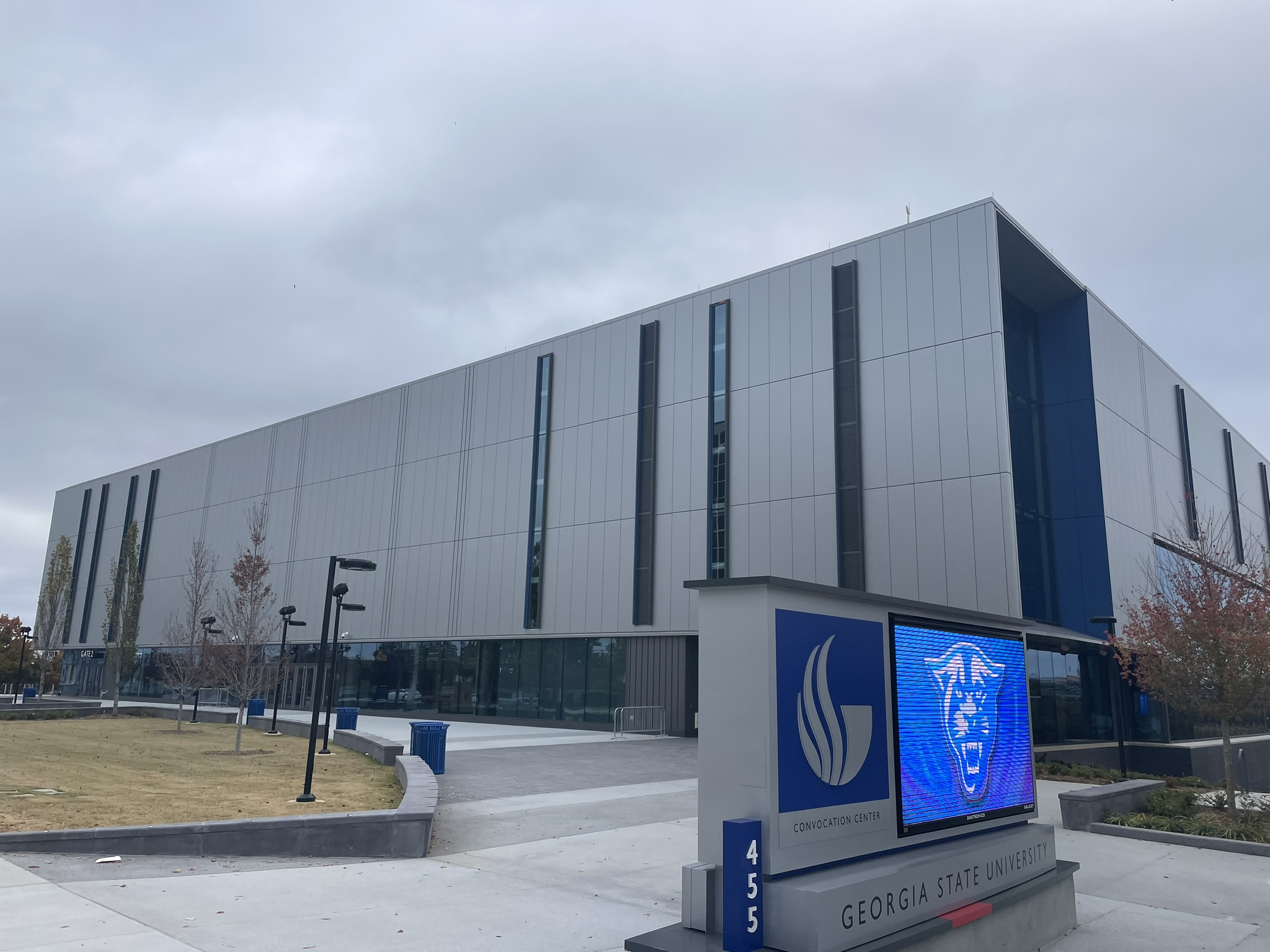
Georgia State Convocation Center, 2022

In 2018, GSU announced that the 8,000-seat Georgia State Convocation Center, hosting the men's and women's basketball teams, was being developed near the recently acquired Turner Field property. Ground was broken the same year, and the facility was completed in time for the 2022–23 season. The 200,000-square-foot (19,000 m^{2}) facility was officially opened on September 13, 2022 and seats 7,300 for basketball games, 7,500 for commencement ceremonies, and 8,000 for concerts.

=== GSU Sports Arena ===
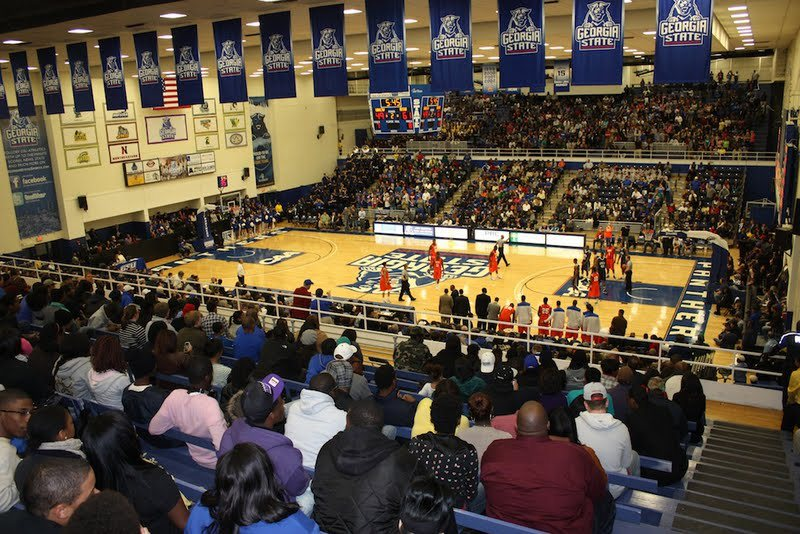
The GSU Sports Arena during a 2012 men's basketball game

The Panthers previously played their home games at the GSU Sports Arena, located at 125 Decatur Street in the heart of the Georgia State campus. The facility was originally built in 1972 as a student gym and classroom space for physical education classes. The arena has a capacity of 3,854. The basketball court was named the Charles "Lefty" Driesell Court in honor of the former Panthers men's basketball coach. After the 2014–15 season, the center-hanging scoreboard was replaced with a four-sided hanging video scoreboard. Plans were released in 2012 to renovate the arena to turn the court 90 degrees, allowing for the court to be completely surrounded by seating with a new capacity of 5,000. These plans have since been abandoned in favor of a brand-new arena adjacent to Georgia State Stadium, which was previously known as Turner Field.

=== Practice Facility ===
In March 2014, work was started on a practice facility for the team as part of an incentive package at the request of head coach Ron Hunter.

In April 2016, the facility was completed, slightly under its initial $1 million budget. The facility was built using an unused aquatics facility, with the court being built over the swimming pool after being filled in with concrete and padding. The court is named for Patty Ferrer and Cathy Henson, whose families were the main contributors to the project. The facility is shared between the men's and women's basketball teams, as well as the indoor volleyball team.

== Coaches ==
Prior to hiring Rob Lanier as head coach, the Georgia State Panthers men's basketball team was led by interim coach, Travis Williams. Most recently, Williams served as an assistant coach under Ron Hunter. Before that, Williams led a successful playing career for the Panthers—totaling over 1,000 career points before graduating in 1995. He also formerly led GSU as an assistant coach under Charles "Lefty" Driesell.

=== Bob Reinhart ===
Coach Bob Reinhart led the Georgia State Panthers men's basketball team from 1985 until 1994. His overall record at Georgia State was 107–148. He has the second-most wins in Georgia State history (107), and is first all-time in tenure (9 seasons); his winning percentage (.420) places him fourth all-time.

When Reinhart took the head coaching job at Georgia State, the Panthers had just gone 2–26 the season prior. In his first season, the team finished with 10 wins. In the 1990–91 season, Reinhart's team finished the regular season 13–14 before achieving a series of "firsts" for Georgia State in the conference tournament. GSU had never before won a game in the conference tournament, had never beaten Little Rock, and had been swept in the regular season by all three teams they would end up facing. The fifth-seed Panthers went on to beat Stetson, USTA and Little Rock to win their first Trans America Athletic Conference tournament title and earn the school's first NCAA tournament bid.

Reinhart was twice named Coach of the Year by the Atlanta Tip-Off Club. The first award came after the 1990–91 TAAC tournament championship season. He was inducted into the Indiana Basketball Hall of Fame in 2017.

Reinhart was fired after the 1993–94 season and was replaced by Carter Wilson, his assistant at GSU and former player and assistant at Decatur High School.

=== Lefty Driesell ===
Charles "Lefty" Driesell became the Panthers' head coach for the 1997–98 season and remained in that position for six years. He won 103 games and lost 59, giving a .636 win percentage. During his time coaching the Panthers, he won the 2000, 2001, and 2002 regular season conference title, the 2001 conference tournament, and advanced to the second round of the 2001 NCAA tournament.

After the 2017–18 season, Driesell was inducted to the Naismith Basketball Hall of Fame.

=== Rod Barnes ===
Coach Rod Barnes, former Southeastern Conference Coach of the Year (2001), coached the Georgia State Panthers men's basketball team from 2007 until 2011. In that time, he managed 44 wins for 79 losses. At the end of the 2010–11 season, athletics director Cheryl Levick fired him with a year remaining on his contract.

=== Ron Hunter ===
"Black Out" game against Georgia Southern in the GSU Sports Arena on Jan. 19, 2016

On March 21, 2011, president Mark P. Becker and director of athletics Cheryl L. Levick announced Ron Hunter as the new head men's basketball coach at Georgia State University. Previously, Hunter spent 17 years as head coach at IUPUI. Known for his affiliation with Samaritan's Feet, a charity that donates shoes to children, Hunter brought with him a tradition of playing one game per season barefoot in an effort to raise awareness to his cause. Hunter inherited a team mostly put together by his predecessor, a lineup that had only managed 12 wins the previous season. With this team, he finished with a 22–12 record—which was just the ninth winning season the program had achieved since its inception in 1984. His son, R. J. Hunter, remained in Indianapolis to finish his high school career with his mother while Hunter coached in Atlanta. R. J. was actively recruited the elder Hunter to play at Georgia State, where he committed over Virginia Tech, Wake Forest and Iowa. R. J. would eventually go on to become the school's all-time leading scorer while breaking many other offensive records.

Coach Hunter became the third Georgia State coach to take the Panthers to the NCAA tournament during the 2015 iteration of the event. After beating Georgia Southern in the SBC tournament, Coach Hunter tore his achilles tendon while running to his son R. J. Hunter in celebration, garnering attention from the media before their trip to the NCAA's. Due to his injury, Hunter was forced to coach in the NCAA tournament from a rolling stool. After a dramatic comeback over the third seeded Baylor Bears capped by a deep three-pointer shot by his son, R. J., Coach Hunter fell off his stool in celebration. This resulted in a media firestorm resulting in multiple interviews, features, and a spot in "One Shining Moment" at the conclusion of the tournament. The Panthers would be eliminated from the tournament in the next round by Xavier.

After the 2018–2019 season, Ron Hunter had the most wins in Georgia State history (171) and guided GSU to six post-season berths in his eight seasons at the helm. Under Ron Hunter, GSU also won Sun Belt Conference titles in 4 of his last 6 seasons, which included regular season championships in 2014, 2015 and 2019 and tournament championships in 2015, 2018 and 2019. During Hunter's tenure, the program produced the Sun Belt Conference Player of the Year three times: R. J. Hunter (2014, 2015) and D'Marcus Simonds (2018). Some of the most notable victories in Hunter's tenure included VCU, Baylor, Georgia Tech, Georgia and Alabama.

=== Rob Lanier ===
Rob Lanier, former associate head coach of the Tennessee Volunteers, was hired as head coach of the Panthers on April 5, 2019. His previous head coaching experience was with the Siena Saints, where he led the team to one NCAA Tournament appearance in four years, progressing through the First Four in the 2002 edition.

Lanier's first season finished with a 19–13 record, but the Panthers fell to rival Georgia Southern in the quarterfinals of the Sun Belt Conference tournament. The following season, Lanier led the Panthers to a victory over crosstown foe Georgia Tech, 123–120 in quadruple overtime. The game was GSU's first win over an ACC opponent, and saw several program records set, including most points scored in a game. The 2020–21 squad were ultimately crowned Sun Belt regular season champions, and reached the Sun Belt Conference tournament final, where they lost the championship game 80–73 to Appalachian State.

Bringing back a senior-laden veteran roster, Lanier's third team at GSU was the preseason favorite in the Sun Belt Conference. While the regular season league crown went to Texas State, GSU clinched the conference tournament title with a win over Louisiana in the tournament title game, securing an NCAA Tournament automatic bid—the Panthers' fourth in eight years. Drawing a 16 seed in the NCAA Tournament, GSU were running number one overall seed Gonzaga close, trailing 62–58 with 10½ minutes remaining, before eventually falling to a 93–72 defeat. Lanier left to take up the head coaching role at Southern Methodist University after GSU's elimination.

=== Jonas Hayes ===
On April 11, 2022, Jonas Hayes was officially introduced as Georgia State's men's basketball head coach. Hayes spent the previous four seasons as an assistant coach at Xavier. On March 16, 2022, Hayes was named interim head coach for Xavier, where he led the program to its first NIT championship in 64 years. Xavier's unexpected run in the NIT included wins over Florida, Vanderbilt, St. Bonaventure and Texas A&M.

Hayes is well known in the Atlanta area, as he and his twin brother Jarvis were standout players at the University of Georgia from 2001 to 2004. Hayes helped lead the Bulldogs to appearances in the 2002 NCAA Tournament and the 2004 NIT.

== Conference membership ==
- Sun Belt Conference (1976–1981)
- Independent (1981–1983)
- TAAC/Atlantic Sun (1983–2005)
- Colonial Athletic Association (2005–2013)
- Sun Belt Conference (2013–present)

== Postseason ==
=== Conference tournament championship results ===
Throughout its years in the TAAC/Atlantic Sun, Colonial Athletic Association, and Sun Belt Conference, Georgia State has made it to the conference championship 10 times. Their combined record is 6–4.

Year	Seed	Opponent	Result
1991	#5	#6 Arkansas-Little Rock	W 80–60
1992	#2	#1 Georgia Southern	L 82–95
2001	#1	#2 Troy State	W 79-55
2002	#1	#3 Florida Atlantic	L 75-76
2014	#1	#3 Louisiana-Lafayette	L 81-82(OT)
2015	#1	#2 Georgia Southern	W 38-36
2018	#2	#4 UT Arlington	W 74-61
2019	#1	#2 UT Arlington	W 73-64
2021	#E1	#E4 Appalachian State	L 73-80
2022	#3	#8 Louisiana	W 80-71

=== NCAA tournament results ===
Georgia State has been to the NCAA tournament six times. Their combined record is 2–6.

Year	Seed	Round	Opponent	Result
1991	#16	First Round	#1 Arkansas	L 76–117
2001	#11	First Round; Second Round	#6 Wisconsin #3 Maryland	W 50–49; L 60–79
2015	#14	Second Round; Third Round	#3 Baylor #6 Xavier	W 57–56; L 67–75
2018	#15	First Round	#2 Cincinnati	L 53–68
2019	#14	First Round	#3 Houston	L 55–84
2022	#16	First Round	#1 Gonzaga	L 72–93

=== NIT results ===
Georgia State has been to the National Invitation Tournament twice. Their combined record is 0–2.

Year	Round	Opponent	Result
2002	Opening Round	Tennessee Tech	L 62–64
2014	First Round	Clemson	L 66–78

=== CIT results ===
Georgia State has appeared in two CollegeInsider.com Tournaments. Their combined record is 1–2.

Year	Round	Opponent	Result
2012	First Round; Second Round	Tennessee Tech; Mercer	W 74–43; L 59–64
2017	First Round	Texas A&M–Corpus Christi	L 64–80

== Panthers of note ==
- R. J. Hunter: First-round NBA draft pick by the Boston Celtics, 2014 & 2015 AP All-America Honorable Mention, 2014 & 2015 Sun Belt Player of the Year, 2014 & 2015 Sun Belt Male Athlete of the Year, 2014 & 2015 First Team All-Sun Belt, 2014 Atlanta Tipoff Club Georgia Men's College Player of the Year, 2013 Kyle Macy Freshman All-America, 2013 First Team All-CAA, 2013 CAA Freshman of the Year
- Ousman Krubally (born 1988), American-Gambian basketball player in the Israeli Basketball Premier League
- D'Marcus Simonds: 2018 AP All-America Honorable Mention, 2018 Sun Belt Player of the Year, 2018 Atlanta Tipoff Club Georgia Men's College Player of the Year, 2019 First Team All Sun Belt, 2018 First Team All Sun Belt, 2017 Sun Belt Freshman of the Year
- Shernard Long: Transfer from Georgetown. 2001 AP All-America Honorable Mention, 2001 TAAC Player of the Year, 2000 & 2001 First Team All-A-SUN
- Thomas Terrell: 2002 AP All-America Honorable Mention, 2002 A-SUN Player of the Year, 2002 First Team All-A-SUN, 2002 A-SUN All-Tournament Team, 2001 & 2002 A-SUN tournament MVP
- Ryan Harrow: Transfer from Kentucky. 2014 & 2015 First Team All-Sun Belt, 2015 Atlanta Tipoff Club Georgia Men's College Player of the Year, 2015 Sun Belt All-Tournament Team
- Nate Williams: 2003 First Team All-Atlantic Sun, 2004 First Team All-Atlantic Sun
- Kevin Morris: Transfer from Georgia Tech. 2001 First Team All-Atlantic Sun, 2001 First Team Atlantic Sun All-Tournament, 1999 TAAC Newcomer of the Year
- Manny Atkins: Transfer from Virginia Tech. 2014 Second Team All-Sun Belt
- Jeremy Hollowell: Transfer from Indiana. 2017 Second Team All-Sun Belt
- Eric Buckner: 2012 Third Team All-CAA
- Devtona White: 2014 Third Team All-Sun Belt
- Malik Benlevi: 2019 Sun Belt Tournament MVP
- Kevin Ware: Transfer from Louisville. 2015 Sun Belt Tournament MVP
- Chris Collier: Transfer from North Greenville Junior College. 1991 TAAC Tournament MVP. Averaged a double-double for the 1990–91 season with 18.2 points and 10.6 rebounds per game to go with 40 blocked shots.
- Darryl Cooper: Transfer from LSU

== Rivalries ==
=== Georgia State vs. Georgia Southern ===
Georgia State and Georgia Southern have met off and on since 1972 with the only significant break in the series coming between 1996 and 2009. While Georgia Southern leads the all-time series, Georgia State has won more games in the last 10 years. Home court advantage typically plays a major factor in this rivalry as the home team won every game from 1996 until 2019 (did not play between 1996 and 2009). That streak was broken on March 9, 2019 when Georgia State defeated Georgia Southern in Statesboro in a de facto regular season conference championship game by a score of 90–85. Georgia Southern defeated Georgia State 79–70 on February 28, 2020 in Atlanta. This game snapped the home winning streak for Georgia State going back to 1992.

Georgia Southern holds a 38–26 series lead over the Panthers, but GSU has won 7 of the past 9 matchups, including three straight. GSU is 2–0 against Georgia Southern in the Sunbelt Conference tournament.

=== Georgia State vs. Louisiana ===
The Panthers and the Ragin' Cajuns have only met 19 times in the history of their programs, but the game quickly evolved into a heated rivalry shortly after Georgia State re-joined the Sun Belt Conference in 2013. Since 2013, the Panthers and Cajuns have combined for three regular season SBC championships and three SBC tournament championships. Also since that time, GSU and ULL have led the conference in wins, respectively. Ron Hunter was 11–5 against Louisiana Coach, Bob Marlin, during his tenure with the Georgia State program.

At the conclusion of the 2021–2022 season, Georgia State holds a 17–7 lead over the Ragin' Cajuns.

=== Georgia State vs. Troy ===
Georgia State and Troy have met off and on since 1952. They began to play each other regularly while both teams were members of the Atlantic Sun Conference until 2005 when both members left. The two became conference mates again in 2013 when Georgia State joined the Sun Belt Conference.

Under Coach Ron Hunter, the rivalry remained a competitive match-up as the Panthers were just 7–8 against the Trojans during that time period. In fact, since Georgia State rejoined the Sun Belt, Troy has proven to be the Achilles' heel for the Panthers as they are the only conference foe they have failed to secure a winning record against.

One of the most memorable games of the series came when the Trojans famously upset the Panthers 85–81 on February 15, 2014 in a nationally televised game. This game was notable because it not only ended Georgia State's 14 game winning streak (the longest in school history), but would be the only game to tarnish the Panthers' otherwise perfect conference record during the 2013–14 regular season in which they finished 17–1.

Another memorable moment in the rivalry came during the 2017 Sun Belt Conference tournament. At #2, the Panthers were the highest seeded team remaining in the tournament. With #1 seed UT-Arlington taking an early exit, the only teams standing between Georgia State and another berth in the NCAA tournament were #6 seed Troy and #4 Texas State. The Panthers had effectively secured the easiest path to the Championship and would be favored the rest of the way. At half-time, the Panthers held a 37–28 lead and appeared to be on their way to the conference finals. However, Troy ultimately seized the moment from the Panthers as they went on to win 74–63 in yet another shocking upset in the series.

At the conclusion of the 2021–22 season, Troy holds a 22–20 edge over the Panthers.

== School records ==
=== Team ===
- Most wins - 29 during the 2000–01 season
- Longest Winning Streak - 14 games during the 2013–14 regular season.
- Most free throws made in a game - 22 of 22 on January 9, 2014 against Western Kentucky
- Most assists in a game - 27 on November 14, 2015 against Tennessee Temple
- Most blocks in a game - 14 on December 1, 2011 against FIU
- Largest Margin of Victory - by 60 points on November 14, 2014 against Tennessee Temple

=== Personal in game ===
- Most points - 49 by Chris Collier (vs. Butler) on January 2, 1991
- Most field goals made - Tied 3 ways at 19, by Chris Collier (vs. Butler) on January 2, 1991; by Bob Pierson (vs. Georgia Southern) on December 14, 1976; and by Jackie Poag (vs. Chattanooga) on January 6, 1972
- Most field goal attempts - 29 by Jackie Poag (vs. Chattanooga) on January 6, 1972
- Most 3-pointers made - 12 by R. J. Hunter (vs. UTSA) on December 22, 2013 (beating his original record of 10 (vs. Old Dominion) on February 2, 2013)
- Most 3-pointers attempted - 19 by R. J. Hunter (vs. UTSA) on December 22, 2013
- Most free throws made - 18 by Ron Ricketts (vs. Southwestern Memphis) on January 20, 1971
- Most free throws attempted - Tied 2 ways at 22, by Travis Williams (vs. Florida International) on January 14, 1993; and by Bo Wolfe (vs. Rollins) on December 15, 1967
- Most rebounds - 28 by Ron Ricketts (vs. Baptist) on January 8, 1972
- Most assists - 15 by Howie Jarvis (vs. South Florida) on February 29, 1979
- Most blocks - Tied 3 ways at 9, by Curtis Washington (vs. Southern Poly) on November 9, 2013; James Vincent (vs. Monmouth) on November 20, 2012; and by Sylvester Morgan (vs. Mercer) on January 23, 2005
- Most steals - Tied 5 ways at 8, by R. J. Hunter (vs. UL Lafayette) on March 14, 2015; Shernard Long (vs. Campbell) on January 4, 2000; by Corey Gauff (vs. SE Louisiana) on February 27, 1992; by Dewey Haley (vs. Centenary) on February 2, 1985; and by Chris Collier (vs. Florida International) on December 20, 1989

=== Personal in season ===
- Most points - 742 by D'Marcus Simonds during the 2017–18 season
- Most points by a freshman - 527 by R.J. Hunter during the 2012–13 season
- Most points per game - 21.1 by Ron Ricketts during the 1970–71 season
- Most field goals made - 277 by D'Marcus Simonds during the 2017–18 season
- Most 3-point field goals - 100 by R. J. Hunter during the 2013–14 season
- Most free throws made - 203 by Phillip Luckydo during the 1990–91 season
- Most consecutive free throws made - 38 by R. J. Hunter during the 2013–14 season
- Most rebounds - 328 by Chris Collier during the 1990–91 season
- Most double-doubles - 18 by Chris Collier during the 1990–91 season
- Most triple-doubles - 1 by D'Marcus Simonds during the 2017–18 season
- Most assists - 222 by Eric Ervin during the 1982–83 season
- Most blocks - 118 by Eric Buckner during the 2011–12 season
- Most steals - 84 by Kevin Morris during the 2000–01 season

=== Personal in career (at GSU) ===
- Total career points - R. J. Hunter at 1,819
- Total 3-point attempts - R. J. Hunter at 715
- Total 3-pointers made - R. J. Hunter at 253
- Total 3-point percentage - Marcus Brown at .449
- Total field goals attempted - R. J. Hunter at 1,321
- Total field goals made - D'Marcus Simonds at 589
- Total field goal percentage - Chris Jackson at .604
- Total free throws attempted - Terrence Brandon at 531
- Total free throws made - R. J. Hunter at 448
- Final free throw percentage - R. J. Hunter at .853
- Total career rebounds - Terrence Brandon at 750
- Total double-doubles - Tied between Chris Collier and Quincy Gause at 29
- Total career blocked shots - Zavian Smith at 182
- Total career assists - Rodney Hamilton at 535
- Total career steals - Rodney Hamilton at 212
- Total games played - Markus Crider at 129
- Total games started - Rodney Hamilton at 105
- Total career wins - Ryann Green at 87
