= Terrell Burden =

American basketball player (born 2000)

No. 1 – Newcastle Eagles
- Position: Point guard
- League: Super League Basketball

Personal information
- Born: November 25, 2000 (age 25) Smyrna, Georgia, U.S.
- Listed height: 5 ft 10 in (1.78 m)
- Listed weight: 170 lb (77 kg)

Career information
- High school: Campbell (Smyrna, Georgia)
- College: Kennesaw State (2019–2024)
- NBA draft: 2024: undrafted
- Playing career: 2025–present

Career history
- 2025: KK Rogaška
- 2025: Denain Voltaire
- 2025–present: Newcastle Eagles

Career highlights
- 2× Second-team All-ASUN (2023, 2024); ASUN tournament MVP (2023)

Terrell Burden Jr. (born November 25, 2000) is an American professional basketball player for Newcastle Eagles of Super League Basketball. He played college basketball for the Kennesaw State Owls.

== High school career ==
Burden attended Campbell High School in Smyrna, Georgia. As a junior, Burden averaged 17 points and seven assists per games, helping lead Campbell to the state tournament quarterfinals. As a senior, he averaged 23.2 points, 5.1 rebounds, 5.8 assists, and 2.3 steals per game before committing to play college basketball at Kennesaw State University.

== College career ==
As a senior, during the 2022–23 season, Burden averaged 13.5 points, 4.2 assists, and nearly two steals per game. In the ASUN championship game against Liberty, Burden recorded 19 points, three assists, and two steals, including the game-winning free throw, helping lead Kennesaw State to a 67–66 victory and their first ever NCAA tournament berth. As a result, he was named the tournament's MVP. The following season, in a game against FGCU, Burden hit a game-winning three as time expired to help lead Kennesaw State to a 78–75 victory. On January 24, 2024, Burden scored a career-high 37 points, setting the school record for individual points in a single game.

== Professional career ==
After going undrafted in the 2024 NBA draft, Burden signed with the College Park Skyhawks on October 26, 2024. However, he was waived on November 3.

On January 15, 2025, Burden signed with KK Rogaška of the Premier A Slovenian Basketball League. In nine games with Rogaška, he averaged 19.9 points, 7.6 assists, and 4.1 rebounds per game. On April 19, 2025, Burden signed with Denain Voltaire Basket of the LNB Pro B.

On December 13, 2025, Burden signed with the Newcastle Eagles of Super League Basketball.

== Career statistics ==
Legend
GP	Games played	GS	Games started	MPG	Minutes per game
FG%	Field goal percentage	3P%	3-point field goal percentage	FT%	Free throw percentage
RPG	Rebounds per game	APG	Assists per game	SPG	Steals per game
BPG	Blocks per game	PPG	Points per game	**Bold**	Career high

=== College ===
Year	Team	GP	GS	MPG	FG%	3P%	FT%	RPG	APG	SPG	BPG	PPG
2019–20	Kennesaw State	14	9	28.1	.352	.158	.648	2.6	2.1	.5	.1	9.6
2020–21	Kennesaw State	24	14	22.2	.447	.143	.620	2.4	2.3	1.0	.2	7.6
2021–22	Kennesaw State	30	29	29.3	.417	.289	.708	2.7	4.9	1.2	.5	11.6
2022–23	Kennesaw State	35	35	30.1	.484	.338	.667	3.2	4.1	1.6	.3	13.5
2023–24	Kennesaw State	31	30	31.4	.442	.310	.643	3.5	6.3	1.4	.4	16.8
