= 2022–23 Kennesaw State Owls men's basketball team =

American college basketball season

2022–23 Kennesaw State Owls men's basketball

ASUN regular-season and tournament champions

NCAA tournament, first round
- Conference: ASUN Conference
- Record: 26–9 (15–3 ASUN)
- Head coach: Amir Abdur-Rahim (4th season)
- Associate head coach: Ben Fletcher
- Assistant coaches: William Small; Pershin Williams
- Home arena: KSU Convocation Center

2022–23 ASUN men's basketball standings
	Conf.				Overall
Team	W		L	PCT	W		L	PCT
Kennesaw State †	15	–	3	.833	26	–	9	.743
Liberty	15	–	3	.833	27	–	9	.750
Eastern Kentucky	12	–	6	.667	23	–	14	.622
Stetson	12	–	6	.667	17	–	14	.548
Lipscomb	11	–	7	.611	20	–	13	.606
North Alabama	10	–	8	.556	18	–	15	.545
North Florida	9	–	9	.500	14	–	17	.452
Bellarmine*	9	–	9	.500	15	–	18	.455
Queens*	7	–	11	.389	18	–	15	.545
Florida Gulf Coast	7	–	11	.389	17	–	15	.531
Jacksonville	6	–	12	.333	13	–	16	.448
Jacksonville State	6	–	12	.333	13	–	18	.419
Central Arkansas	4	–	14	.222	9	–	22	.290
Austin Peay	3	–	15	.167	9	–	22	.290
† 2023 ASUN tournament winner * Ineligible for the 2023 NCAA tournament due to transition from Division II

The 2022–23 Kennesaw State Owls men's basketball team represented Kennesaw State University in the 2022–23 NCAA Division I men's basketball season. The Owls, led by fourth-year head coach Amir Abdur-Rahim, played their home games at the KSU Convocation Center in Kennesaw, Georgia as members of the ASUN Conference. They finished the season with 26–9, 15–3 in ASUN play, to earn a share of the regular-season championship. As the No. 1 seed in the ASUN tournament, the Owls defeated Queens, Lipscomb and Liberty to win the tournament championship. As a result, they received the conference's automatic bid to the NCAA tournament, the school's first-ever trip to the tournament. As the No. 14 seed in the Midwest region, they lost in the first round to Xavier.

On March 29, 2023, head coach Amir Abdur-Rahim left the school to take the head coaching position at South Florida. On April 7, the school named Alabama assistant coach Antoine Pettway the team's new head coach.

== Previous season ==
The Owls finished the 2021–22 season 13–18, 7–9 in ASUN play, to finish in fourth place in the East Division. In the ASUN tournament, they defeated Eastern Kentucky in the first round before falling to Jacksonville State in the quarterfinals.

== Roster ==
2022–23 Kennesaw State Owls men's basketball team
Players
Coaches

Pos.	#	Name	Height	Weight	Year	Previous school	Hometown
F	0	Demond Robinson	6 ft 8 in (2.03 m)	264 lb (120 kg)	Sr	Murray State	Montgomery, AL
G	1	Terrell Burden	5 ft 10 in (1.78 m)	170 lb (77 kg)	Sr	Campbell HS	Smyrna, GA
G	2	Simeon Cottle	6 ft 1 in (1.85 m)	165 lb (75 kg)	Fr	Tri-Cities HS	College Park, GA
G	3	Chris Youngblood	6 ft 4 in (1.93 m)	218 lb (99 kg)	Jr	East Coweta HS	Tuscaloosa, AL
F	4	Cole LaRue	6 ft 9 in (2.06 m)	236 lb (107 kg)	Jr	McGill–Toolen HS	Mobile, AL
G	5	Brandon Stroud	6 ft 6 in (1.98 m)	200 lb (91 kg)	Jr	East Coweta HS	Atlanta, GA
F	10	Alex Peterson	6 ft 7 in (2.01 m)	218 lb (99 kg)	Sr	Missouri State–West Plains	Tappahannock, VA
G	13	Kasen Jennings	6 ft 3 in (1.91 m)	202 lb (92 kg)	Jr	Langston Hughes HS	Atlanta, GA
C	15	Yves Nkomba	6 ft 11 in (2.11 m)	220 lb (100 kg)	Jr	Three Rivers College	Leeds, England
G	21	Armani Harris	6 ft 6 in (1.98 m)	204 lb (93 kg)	Sr	Newton HS	Brooklyn, NY
G	22	Spencer Rodgers	6 ft 4 in (1.93 m)	188 lb (85 kg)	Sr	SW Mississippi CC	Buford, GA
G	23	Ahmad Johnson	6 ft 4 in (1.93 m)	195 lb (88 kg)	Jr	Colby CC	Punta Gorda, FL
G	24	Quincy Ademokoya	6 ft 6 in (1.98 m)	185 lb (84 kg)	Jr	Temple	Bloomington, IL
G	30	Matt Brown	6 ft 5 in (1.96 m)	185 lb (84 kg)	So	The Walker School	Stockbridge, GA
G	31	Charles Stone	6 ft 2 in (1.88 m)	170 lb (77 kg)	Fr	Columbus HS	Columbus, GA
G	33	Eric Holland	5 ft 8 in (1.73 m)	145 lb (66 kg)	Fr	Rome HS	Rome, GA

Head coach

- Amir Abdur-Rahim (Southeastern Louisiana)

Assistant coach(es)

- Ben Fletcher (Troy)
- William Small (Belhaven)
- Pershin Williams (North Florida)

Legend

- (C) Team captain
- (S) Suspended
- (I) Ineligible
- (W) Walk-on
- Injured
- Current redshirt

Roster
Last update: November 17, 2022

== Schedule and results ==
Date time, TV	Rank^{#}	Opponent^{#}	Result	Record	Site (attendance) city, state
Non-conference regular season
November 7, 2022*; 7:00 p.m., ESPN+		LaGrange	W 99–56	1–0	KSU Convocation Center (1,285); Kennesaw, GA
November 11, 2022*; 7:00 p.m., SECN+		at Florida	L 78–88	1–1	O'Connell Center (9,072); Gainesville, FL
November 14, 2022*; 7:00 p.m., ESPN+		Brewton–Parker	W 95–36	2–1	KSU Convocation Center (924); Kennesaw, GA
November 18, 2022*; 4:00 p.m.		vs. Southeastern Louisiana; Appalachian State Tournament	W 72–68	3–1	Holmes Center (109); Boone, NC
November 19, 2022*; 7:00 p.m., ESPN+		at Appalachian State; Appalachian State Tournament	W 71–67	4–1	Holmes Center (2,603); Boone, NC
November 20, 2022*; 12:00 p.m.		vs. Campbell; Appalachian State Tournament	L 61–85	4–2	Holmes Center (158); Boone, NC
November 26, 2022*; 4:00 p.m., ESPN+		at VCU	L 61–64	4–3	Siegel Center (6,807); Richmond, VA
December 2, 2022*; 7:00 p.m., ESPN+		at Mercer	W 66–63	5–3	Hawkins Arena (958); Macon, GA
December 5, 2022*; 7:00 p.m., ESPN+		at Charleston Southern	W 76–65	6–3	Buccaneer Field House (627); North Charleston, SC
December 12, 2022*; 10:00 p.m., MWN		at San Diego State	L 54–88	6–4	Viejas Arena (11,532); San Diego, CA
December 17, 2022*; 2:00 p.m., ESPN+		Georgia College	W 79–55	7–4	KSU Convocation Center (657); Kennesaw, GA
December 20, 2022*; 7:00 p.m., ESPN+		USC Upstate	W 65–56	8–4	KSU Convocation Center (652); Kennesaw, GA
December 23, 2022*; 7:00 p.m., BTN		at No. 18 Indiana	L 55–69	8–5	Simon Skjodt Assembly Hall (12,978); Bloomington, IN
ASUN Conference regular season
December 31, 2022; 2:00 p.m., ESPN+		Central Arkansas	W 82–66	9–5 (1–0)	KSU Convocation Center (688); Kennesaw, GA
January 2, 2023; 6:30 p.m., ESPN+		Eastern Kentucky	W 79–75	10–5 (2–0)	KSU Convocation Center (810); Kennesaw, GA
January 5, 2023; 7:00 p.m., ESPN+		at North Florida	L 86–89	10–6 (2–1)	UNF Arena (1,042); Jacksonville, FL
January 7, 2023; 8:00 p.m., ESPN+		at Queens	W 76–67	11–6 (3–1)	Curry Arena (416); Charlotte, NC
January 12, 2023; 7:00 p.m., ESPN+		Jacksonville	W 81–68	12–6 (4–1)	KSU Convocation Center (1,547); Kennesaw, GA
January 14, 2023; 2:00 p.m., ESPN+		North Florida	W 86–72	13–6 (5–1)	KSU Convocation Center (764); Kennesaw, GA
January 19, 2023; 7:00 p.m., ESPN+		at Stetson	W 82–81 ^{OT}	14–6 (6–1)	Edmunds Center (929); DeLand, FL
January 21, 2023; 7:00 p.m., ESPN+		at Florida Gulf Coast	W 65–63	15–6 (7–1)	Alico Arena (2,171); Fort Myers, FL
January 26, 2023; 7:30 p.m., ESPN+		Austin Peay	W 84–57	16–6 (8–1)	KSU Convocation Center (1,945); Kennesaw, GA
January 28, 2023; 5:00 p.m., ESPN+		Lipscomb	W 85-72	17-6 (9-1)	KSU Convocation Center (1,879); Kennesaw, GA
February 2, 2023; 7:30 p.m., ESPN+		at Bellarmine	W 90-84 ^{OT}	18-6 (10-1)	Freedom Hall (1,649); Louisville, KY
February 4, 2023; 7:00 p.m., ESPN+		at Eastern Kentucky	L 74–77	18–7 (10–2)	McBrayer Arena (3,761); Richmond, KY
February 9, 2023; 8:30 p.m., ESPN+		at Jacksonville State	W 54–52	19–7 (11–2)	Pete Mathews Coliseum (2,434); Jacksonville, FL
February 11, 2023; 5:00 p.m., ESPN+		Jacksonville State	W 74–71	20–7 (12–2)	KSU Convocation Center (1,902); Kennesaw, GA
February 16, 2023; 7:00 p.m., ESPN+		Liberty	W 88–81	21–7 (13–2)	KSU Convocation Center (3,059); Kennesaw, GA
February 18, 2023; 2:00 p.m., ESPN+		Queens	L 76–83	21–8 (13–3)	KSU Convocation Center (1,514); Kennesaw, GA
February 22, 2023; 7:00 p.m., ESPN+		at North Alabama	W 79–66	22–8 (14–3)	Flowers Hall (1,735); Florence, AL
February 24, 2023; 8:00 p.m., ESPN+		at Central Arkansas	W 72–56	23–8 (15–3)	Farris Center; Conway, AR
ASUN tournament
February 28, 2023; 7:00 p.m., ESPN+	(1)	(9) Queens; Quarterfinals	W 67–66	24–8	KSU Convocation Center (2,322); Kennesaw, GA
March 2, 2023; 7:00 p.m., ESPN+	(1)	(5) Lipscomb; Semifinals	W 80–71	25–8	KSU Convocation Center (3,137); Kennesaw, GA
March 5, 2023; 3:00 p.m., ESPN2	(1)	(2) Liberty; Championship	W 67–66	26–8	KSU Convocation Center (3,805); Kennesaw, GA
NCAA tournament
March 17, 2023*; 12:40 p.m., TruTV	(14 MW)	vs. (3 MW) No. 13 Xavier; First round	L 67–72	26–9	Greensboro Coliseum; Greensboro, NC
*Non-conference game. ^{#}Rankings from AP poll. (#) Tournament seedings in parentheses. All times are in Eastern.
