= 2022–23 Austin Peay Governors basketball team =

American college basketball season

2022–23 Austin Peay Governors basketball
- Conference: ASUN Conference
- Record: 9–22 (3–15 ASUN)
- Head coach: Nate James (2nd season)
- Associate head coach: Brett Carey
- Assistant coaches: Jason Harris; Carl Little
- Home arena: Dunn Center

2022–23 ASUN men's basketball standings
	Conf.				Overall
Team	W		L	PCT	W		L	PCT
Kennesaw State †	15	–	3	.833	26	–	9	.743
Liberty	15	–	3	.833	27	–	9	.750
Eastern Kentucky	12	–	6	.667	23	–	14	.622
Stetson	12	–	6	.667	17	–	14	.548
Lipscomb	11	–	7	.611	20	–	13	.606
North Alabama	10	–	8	.556	18	–	15	.545
North Florida	9	–	9	.500	14	–	17	.452
Bellarmine*	9	–	9	.500	15	–	18	.455
Queens*	7	–	11	.389	18	–	15	.545
Florida Gulf Coast	7	–	11	.389	17	–	15	.531
Jacksonville	6	–	12	.333	13	–	16	.448
Jacksonville State	6	–	12	.333	13	–	18	.419
Central Arkansas	4	–	14	.222	9	–	22	.290
Austin Peay	3	–	15	.167	9	–	22	.290
† 2023 ASUN tournament winner * Ineligible for the 2023 NCAA tournament due to transition from Division II

The 2022–23 Austin Peay Governors men's basketball team represented Austin Peay State University in the 2022–23 NCAA Division I men's basketball season. The Governors, led by second-year head coach Nate James, played their home games at the Dunn Center in Clarksville, Tennessee as first-year members of the ASUN Conference. They finished the season 9–22, 3–15 in ASUN play to finish in last place. They failed to qualify for the ASUN tournament.

On March 5, 2023, the school fired head coach Nate James. On March 13, the school named Northwestern State head coach Corey Gipson the team's new head coach.

== Previous season ==
The Governors finished the 2021–22 season 12–17, 8–10 in OVC play to finish in a tie for fifth place. As the No. 6 seed in the OVC tournament, they lost to Tennessee Tech in the first round.

The season marked their last season as members of the Ohio Valley Conference, where they had been members since 1962. They joined the ASUN Conference on July 1, 2022.

This was also meant to be their last season in the Dunn Center, but the opening of their future home, F&M Bank Arena, was delayed until July 2023.

== Roster ==
2022–23 Austin Peay Governors men's basketball team
Players
Coaches

Pos.	#	Name	Height	Weight	Year	Hometown
G	0	Sean Durugordon	6 ft 5 in (1.96 m)	220 lb (100 kg)	RS So	Harlem, New York
G	1	Carlos Paez	5 ft 10 in (1.78 m)	180 lb (82 kg)	Sr	Naguanagua, Venezuela
G	2	Elijah Perkins	6 ft 4 in (1.93 m)	190 lb (86 kg)	Fr	Middletown, New Jersey
F	3	Caleb Stone-Carrawell	6 ft 7 in (2.01 m)	210 lb (95 kg)	RS So	Concord, North Carolina
C	4	Elijah Hutchins-Everett	6 ft 11 in (2.11 m)	255 lb (116 kg)	So	Orange, New Jersey
G	5	Drew Calderon	6 ft 4 in (1.93 m)	190 lb (86 kg)	So	The Woodlands, Texas
G	10	Guy Fauntleroy	5 ft 10 in (1.78 m)	170 lb (77 kg)	Fr	Prince George's County, Maryland
G	11	Rodrique Massenat	6 ft 5 in (1.96 m)	200 lb (91 kg)	Jr	Trenton, New Jersey
F	12	Shon Robinson	6 ft 9 in (2.06 m)	225 lb (102 kg)	RS So	Chicago, Illinois
F	14	Nathan Moore	6 ft 9 in (2.06 m)	220 lb (100 kg)	RS Jr	Huntsville, Alabama
G	20	Codey Bates	6 ft 2 in (1.88 m)	210 lb (95 kg)	Sr	Memphis, Tennessee
G	22	Kamarie Coffey	6 ft 7 in (2.01 m)	200 lb (91 kg)	So	Clarksville, Tennessee
F	23	Kelechi Okworogwo	6 ft 6 in (1.98 m)	210 lb (95 kg)	Fr	The Bronx, New York
F	24	Jalen Ware	6 ft 8 in (2.03 m)	200 lb (91 kg)	RS So	Winston-Salem, North Carolina
F	41	Cameron Copeland	6 ft 7 in (2.01 m)	190 lb (86 kg)	Sr	Douglasville, Georgia
G	42	Jacob Roberts	6 ft 4 in (1.93 m)	210 lb (95 kg)	So	Memphis, Tennessee

Head coach

- Nate James (Duke)

Assistant coach(es)

- Brett Carey (UNC Asheville)
- Jason Harris (Fordham)
- Carl Little (Liberty)

Legend

- (C) Team captain
- (S) Suspended
- (I) Ineligible
- (W) Walk-on
- Injured
- Current redshirt

Roster
Last update: December 11, 2022

== Schedule and results ==
Date time, TV	Rank^{#}	Opponent^{#}	Result	Record	Site (attendance) city, state
Exhibition
November 2, 2022*; 7:00 pm, ESPN+		Fisk	W 89–64	–	Dunn Center (1,227); Clarksville, TN
Non-conference regular season
November 7, 2022*; 7:00 pm, ACCNX		at NC State	L 50–99	0–1	PNC Arena (11,109); Raleigh, NC
November 11, 2022*; 6:00 pm, BTN		at Purdue	L 44–63	0–2	Mackey Arena (14,876); West Lafayette, IN
November 14, 2022*; 7:00 pm, ESPN+		Milligan	W 98–74	1–2	Dunn Center (1,237); Clarksville, TN
November 17, 2022*; 6:00 pm, ESPN+		at South Florida; Sunshine Slam campus-site game	W 62–60	2–2	Yuengling Center (1,910); Tampa, FL
November 21, 2022*; 11:00 am, FloHoops		vs. Albany; Sunshine Slam Ocean Bracket semifinals	W 74–59	3–2	Ocean Center (1,612); Daytona Beach, FL
November 22, 2022*; 11:00 am, FloHoops		vs. Bucknell; Sunshine Slam Ocean Bracket championship	L 65–79	3–3	Ocean Center (1,417); Daytona Beach, FL
November 26, 2022*; 2:30 pm, ESPN+		Howard	L 55–56	3–4	Dunn Center (1,029); Clarksville, TN
November 30, 2022*; 7:00 pm, ESPN+		Western Kentucky	L 74–75	3–5	Dunn Center (1,833); Clarksville, TN
December 3, 2022*; 3:00 pm, ESPN+		Tennessee State	W 77–61	4–5	Dunn Center (1,736); Clarksville, TN
December 6, 2022*; 7:00 pm, ESPN+		Kentucky Christian	W 102–57	5–5	Dunn Center (1,108); Clarksville, TN
December 12, 2022*; 7:00 pm, ESPN+		Lindsey Wilson	W 86–61	6–5	Dunn Center (1,003); Clarksville, TN
December 16, 2022*; 7:00 pm, ESPN+		at Murray State	L 60-68	6–6	CFSB Center (5,131); Murray, KY
December 21, 2022*; 5:00 pm, SECN+		at No. 8 Tennessee	L 44-86	6–7	Thompson–Boling Arena (18,120); Knoxville, TN
ASUN regular season
December 29, 2022; 5:00 pm, ESPN+		at Queens	L 77–81	6–8 (0–1)	Curry Arena (552); Charlotte, NC
December 31, 2022; 1:00 pm, ESPN+		at North Florida	L 85–90 ^{OT}	6–9 (0–2)	UNF Arena (1,019); Jacksonville, FL
January 5, 2023; 7:00 pm, ESPN+		Florida Gulf Coast	W 61–59	7–9 (1–2)	Dunn Center (1,061); Clarksville, TN
January 7, 2023; 4:30 pm, ESPN+		Central Arkansas	W 86–62	8–9 (2–2)	Dunn Center (1,133); Clarksville, TN
January 12, 2023; 8:00 pm, ESPN+		Lipscomb	L 65–87	8–10 (2–3)	Dunn Center (958); Clarksville, TN
January 14, 2023; 4:00 pm, ESPN+		at Lipscomb	L 72–86	8–11 (2–4)	Allen Arena; Nashville, TN
January 19, 2023; 7:00 pm, ESPN+		Bellarmine	L 45–56	8–12 (2–5)	Dunn Center (1,523); Clarksville, TN
January 21, 2023; 3:00 pm, ESPN+		Eastern Kentucky	L 59–74	8–13 (2–6)	Dunn Center (1,636); Clarksville, TN
January 26, 2023; 6:30 pm, ESPN+		at Kennesaw State	L 57–84	8–14 (2–7)	KSU Convocation Center (1,945); Kennesaw, GA
January 28, 2023; 4:00 pm, ESPN+		at Jacksonville State	L 53–70	8–15 (2–8)	Pete Mathews Coliseum (2,580); Jacksonville, AL
February 2, 2023; 7:00 pm, ESPN+		Liberty	L 70–82	8–16 (2–9)	Dunn Center (1,452); Clarksville, TN
February 4, 2023; 3:00 pm, ESPN+		Queens	L 69–70	8–17 (2–10)	Dunn Center (1,872); Clarksville, TN
February 9, 2023; 7:45 pm, ESPN+		at North Alabama	L 57–70	8–18 (2–11)	Flowers Hall (2,142); Florence, AL
February 11, 2023; 3:30 pm, ESPN+		at Central Arkanasas	L 69–76	8–19 (2–12)	Farris Center (1,448); Conway, AR
February 16, 2023; 7:00 pm, ESPN+		Jacksonville	L 56–60	8–20 (2–13)	Dunn Center (1,497); Clarksville, TN
February 18, 2023; 3:00 pm, ESPN+		North Florida	W 73–71	9–20 (3–13)	Dunn Center (1,975); Clarksville, TN
February 22, 2023; 6:00 pm, ESPN+		at Stetson	L 51–76	9–21 (3–14)	Edmunds Center (650); DeLand, FL
February 24, 2023; 6:00 pm, ESPN+		at Florida Gulf Coast	L 71–89	9–22 (3–15)	Alico Arena (2,291); Fort Myers, FL
*Non-conference game. ^{#}Rankings from AP Poll. (#) Tournament seedings in parentheses. All times are in Central.
