= Jordan Mincy =

American basketball player and coach

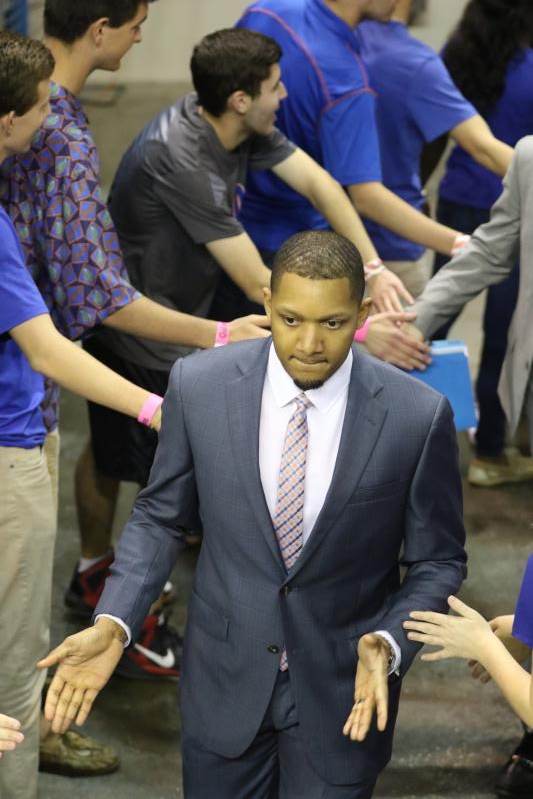

Current position
- Title: Head coach
- Team: Jacksonville
- Conference: ASUN
- Record: 83–79 (.512)

Biographical details
- Born: October 11, 1986 (age 40); Memphis, Tennessee, U.S.

Playing career
- 2005–2009: Kent State

Coaching career (HC unless noted)
- 2009–2010: South Carolina (GA)
- 2010–2012: Kent State (assistant)
- 2012–2013: Charleston (assistant)
- 2013–2014: Toledo (assistant)
- 2014–2015: Louisiana Tech (assistant)
- 2015–2021: Florida (assistant)
- 2021–present: Jacksonville

Head coaching record
- Overall: 83–79 (.512)

Jordan Mincy (born October 11, 1986) is an American basketball coach who is the current head coach of the Jacksonville Dolphins men's basketball team.

== Playing career ==
Mincy played college basketball at Kent State under both Jim Christian and Geno Ford, where he was part of two MAC regular season and conference tournament squads, making two trips to the NCAA tournament in 2006 and 2008. Mincy left as the all-time leader in MAC history in games played at 135, and in seventh place on Kent State's all-time assists list.

== Coaching career ==
After playing, Mincy joined the staff at South Carolina as a graduate assistant for one season before returning to his alma mater for a two-year stint as an assistant coach. In 2013, he'd join Charleston's coaching staff for one season, before moving on to an assistant coaching spot at Toledo. In 2014, Mincy would join Mike White's staff at Louisiana Tech, and follow White to Florida in 2015 as an assistant coach.

On March 25, 2021 Mincy was named the 17th head coach in program history at Jacksonville, replacing Tony Jasick.

== Personal life ==
Mincy's brother Jerome played basketball at UAB where his number 40 jersey is retired, and professionally in Puerto Rico while representing the country's national team in three Summer Olympic games. His sister Jada played basketball at Ole Miss.

== Head coaching record ==
Record table
Season	Team	Overall	Conference	Standing	Postseason
Jacksonville Dolphins (ASUN) (2021–present)
2021–22	Jacksonville	21–10	11–5	2nd (East)	
2022–23	Jacksonville	13–16	6–12	T–11th	
2023–24	Jacksonville	16–17	5–11	T–10th	
2024–25	Jacksonville	19–14	12–6	T–4th	CBI Quarterfinals
2025–26	Jacksonville	12–20	7–11	T–7th	
2026–27	Jacksonville	2–2	0–0		
Jacksonville:		83–79 (.512)	41–45 (.477)		
Total:		83–79 (.512)			
National champion Postseason invitational champion Conference regular season champion Conference regular season and conference tournament champion Division regular season champion Division regular season and conference tournament champion Conference tournament champion
