= 2022–23 Jacksonville State Gamecocks men's basketball team =

American college basketball season

2022–23 Jacksonville State Gamecocks men's basketball
- Conference: ASUN Conference
- Record: 13–18 (6–12 ASUN)
- Head coach: Ray Harper (7th season)
- Assistant coaches: Tommy Wade; Dennan Morrow; Marcus Belcher
- Home arena: Pete Mathews Coliseum

2022–23 ASUN men's basketball standings
	Conf.				Overall
Team	W		L	PCT	W		L	PCT
Kennesaw State †	15	–	3	.833	26	–	9	.743
Liberty	15	–	3	.833	27	–	9	.750
Eastern Kentucky	12	–	6	.667	23	–	14	.622
Stetson	12	–	6	.667	17	–	14	.548
Lipscomb	11	–	7	.611	20	–	13	.606
North Alabama	10	–	8	.556	18	–	15	.545
North Florida	9	–	9	.500	14	–	17	.452
Bellarmine*	9	–	9	.500	15	–	18	.455
Queens*	7	–	11	.389	18	–	15	.545
Florida Gulf Coast	7	–	11	.389	17	–	15	.531
Jacksonville	6	–	12	.333	13	–	16	.448
Jacksonville State	6	–	12	.333	13	–	18	.419
Central Arkansas	4	–	14	.222	9	–	22	.290
Austin Peay	3	–	15	.167	9	–	22	.290
† 2023 ASUN tournament winner * Ineligible for the 2023 NCAA tournament due to transition from Division II

The 2022–23 Jacksonville State Gamecocks men's basketball team represented Jacksonville State University in the 2022–23 NCAA Division I men's basketball season. The Gamecocks, led by seventh-year head coach Ray Harper, played home games at the Pete Mathews Coliseum in Jacksonville, Alabama as second-year members (in their second stint) of the ASUN Conference. They finished the season 13–18, 6–12 to finish in a tie for 11th place. They failed to qualify for the ASUN tournament.

== Previous season ==
The Gamecocks finished the 2021–22 season 21–11, 13–3 in ASUN play to finish in first place in the West division. As the No. 1 seed in the ASUN tournament, the Gamecocks defeated Kennesaw State in the quarterfinals before losing in the semifinals to Jacksonville. However, because the eventual tournament champion, Bellarmine, was ineligible for the NCAA tournament due to their transition to Division I, Jacksonville State received the conference's automatic bid to the NCAA tournament as the No. 15 seed in the Midwest region. They lost in the first round of the tournament to Auburn.

== Roster ==
2021–22 Jacksonville State Gamecocks men's basketball team
Players
Coaches

Pos.	#	Name	Height	Weight	Year	Hometown
G	0	DJ Gordon	6 ft 5 in (1.96 m)	175 lb (79 kg)	So	Garfield, PA
G	1	Demaree King	6 ft 0 in (1.83 m)	180 lb (82 kg)	Sr	Tulsa, OK
G	2	Cam McDowell	6 ft 5 in (1.96 m)	185 lb (84 kg)	So	Powder Springs, GA
C	3	Maros Zeliznak	6 ft 11 in (2.11 m)	265 lb (120 kg)	Sr	Košice, Slovakia
F	4	Marcellus Brigham Jr.	6 ft 7 in (2.01 m)	210 lb (95 kg)	So	Memphis, TN
F	5	Skyelar Potter	6 ft 3 in (1.91 m)	198 lb (90 kg)	Sr	Bowling Green, KY
F	10	Juwan Perdue	6 ft 6 in (1.98 m)	200 lb (91 kg)	Jr	Sumter, SC
G	11	Travis Roberts	6 ft 6 in (1.98 m)	205 lb (93 kg)	Fr	Waldorf, MD
G	13	Peyton Daniels	6 ft 2 in (1.88 m)	185 lb (84 kg)	So	Ellenwood, GA
G	15	JJ Platt	6 ft 1 in (1.85 m)	180 lb (82 kg)	RS Fr	Nashville, TN
G	23	Brad Lewis	6 ft 4 in (1.93 m)	175 lb (79 kg)	So	Alabaster, AL
F	24	Amanze Ngumezi	6 ft 9 in (2.06 m)	245 lb (111 kg)	Jr	Savannah, GA
F	25	Clarence Jackson	6 ft 7 in (2.01 m)	—	Jr	Dublin, GA
C	35	Arda Duraklar	6 ft 11 in (2.11 m)	232 lb (105 kg)	Fr	İzmir, Turkey
C	50	Mason Nicholson	6 ft 10 in (2.08 m)	—	So	Gary, IN

Head coach

- Ray Harper (Kentucky Wesleyan)

Assistant coach(es)

- Tommy Wade (Southeast Missouri State)
- Dennan Morrow (Kansas State)
- Marcus Belcher (Southern Illinois)

Legend

- (C) Team captain
- (S) Suspended
- (I) Ineligible
- (W) Walk-on
- Injured
- Current redshirt

Roster
Last update: November 16, 2022

== Schedule and results ==
Date time, TV	Rank^{#}	Opponent^{#}	Result	Record	High points	High rebounds	High assists	Site (attendance) city, state
Exhibition
November 3, 2022*; 6:00 pm		Auburn Montgomery	W 101–93		42 – Potter	6 – Tied	6 – King	Pete Mathews Coliseum (1,103); Jacksonville, AL
Non-conference regular season
November 7, 2022*; 8:00 pm, ESPN+		Shorter	W 111–48	1–0	20 – Potter	11 – Perdue	6 – Daniels	Pete Mathews Coliseum (2,467); Jacksonville, AL
November 14, 2022*; 7:00 pm, ESPN+		at UIC	L 60–67	1–1	12 – Potter	8 – Potter	3 – Tied	Credit Union 1 Arena (1,019); Chicago, IL
November 18, 2022*; 8:00 pm, SECN+		at No. 18 Alabama	L 62–104	1–2	13 – Tied	5 – Daniels	4 – Daniels	Coleman Coliseum (9,018); Tuscaloosa, AL
November 22, 2022*; 6:00 pm, ESPN+		vs. Elon	W 78–53	2–2	16 – Potter	8 – Potter	4 – Daniels	Pete Mathews Coliseum (1,455); Jacksonville, AL
November 25, 2022*; 6:00 pm, MWN		at New Mexico; Lobo Classic	L 61–79	2–3	13 – Potter	5 – Perdue	4 – Platt	The Pit (9,033); Albuquerque, NM
November 26, 2022*; 8:30 pm		vs. Northern Colorado; Lobo Classic	L 82–86 ^{OT}	2–4	25 – King	12 – Perdue	5 – King	The Pit (8,715); Albuquerque, NM
November 27, 2022*; 4:00 pm		vs. North Dakota State; Lobo Classic	W 81–71	3–4	22 – King	12 – Perdue	4 – Tied	The Pit (7,023); Albuquerque, NM
December 3, 2022*; 3:00 pm, ESPN+		at East Tennessee State	W 63–61	4–4	27 – Potter	7 – Perdue	6 – King	Freedom Hall Civic Center (3,205); Johnson City, TN
December 8, 2022*; 9:00 pm, P12N		at Utah	L 58–99	4–5	16 – Jackson	6 – Perdue	2 – Nguzemi	Jon M. Huntsman Center (5,295); Salt Lake City, UT
December 14, 2022*; 6:30 pm, ESPN+		Reinhardt	W 97–63	5–5	25 – King	7 – Tied	4 – Potter	Pete Mathews Coliseum (1,245); Jacksonville, AL
December 17, 2022*; 1:00 pm, ESPN+		Little Rock	W 72–62	6–5	24 – Potter	7 – Perdue	3 – Platt	Pete Mathews Coliseum (1,043); Jacksonville, AL
December 21, 2022*; 1:00 pm, ESPN+		at South Alabama	L 66–71	6–6	24 – King	9 – Perdue	3 – Jackson	Mitchell Center (1,455); Mobile, AL
December 27, 2022*; 6:00 pm, ESPN+		Georgia Southwestern	W 78–73	7–6	30 – King	8 – Perdue	5 – King	Pete Mathews Coliseum (685); Jacksonville, AL
ASUN Conference regular season
December 30, 2022; 6:00 pm, ESPN+		North Alabama	L 62–66	7–7 (0–1)	21 – Potter	11 – Perdue	4 – King	Pete Mathews Coliseum (2,133); Jacksonville, AL
January 2, 2023; 6:00 pm, ESPN+		at Jacksonville	L 46–62	7–8 (0–2)	13 – King	5 – Potter	2 – Tied	Swisher Gymnasium (802); Jacksonville, FL
January 5, 2023; 6:00 pm, ESPN+		at Liberty	L 41–75	7–9 (0–3)	11 – Potter	6 – Perdue	2 – Roberts	Liberty Arena (2,280); Lynchburg, VA
January 7, 2023; 8:00 pm, ESPN+		Bellarmine	L 62–75	7–10 (0–4)	16 – King	5 – Daniels	4 – King	Pete Mathews Coliseum (2,165); Jacksonville, AL
January 12, 2023; 6:00 pm, ESPN+		North Florida	W 72–63	8–10 (1–4)	21 – Brigham	9 – Brigham	6 – King	Pete Mathews Coliseum (2,344); Jacksonville, AL
January 14, 2023; 4:00 pm, ESPN+		Jacksonville	L 62–68	8–11 (1–5)	14 – King	9 – Brigham	3 – Tied	Pete Mathews Coliseum (2,289); Jacksonville, AL
January 19, 2023; 6:00 pm, ESPN+		at Florida Gulf Coast	L 51–55	8–12 (1–6)	17 – Perdue	11 – Brigham	4 – King	Alico Arena (2,471); Fort Myers, FL
January 21, 2023; 1:00 pm, ESPN+		at Stetson	L 81–87	8–13 (1–7)	21 – Daniels	6 – Brigham Jr.	6 – Daniels	Edmunds Center (675); DeLand, FL
January 26, 2023; 8:00 pm, ESPN+		Lipscomb	W 72–67	9–13 (2–7)	26 – King	8 – Brigham Jr.	5 – King	Pete Mathews Coliseum (2,744); Jacksonville, AL
January 28, 2023; 4:00 pm, ESPN+		Austin Peay	W 70–53	10–13 (3–7)	15 – King	9 – Brigham Jr.	4 – King	Pete Mathews Coliseum (2,580); Jacksonville, AL
February 2, 2023; 6:30 pm, ESPN+		at Eastern Kentucky	L 67–69	10–14 (3–8)	16 – Potter	11 – Potter	3 – Potter	McBrayer Arena (3,486); Richmond, KY
February 4, 2023; 3:00 pm, ESPN+		at Bellarmine	L 64–71	10–15 (3–9)	16 – Brigham Jr.	9 – Potter	5 – King	Freedom Hall (2,738); Louisville, KY
February 9, 2023; 7:30 pm, ESPN+		Kennesaw State	L 52–54	10–16 (3–10)	28 – Potter	12 – Jackson	4 – King	Pete Mathews Coliseum (2,434); Jacksonville, AL
February 11, 2023; 4:30 pm, ESPN+		at Kennesaw State	L 71–74	10–17 (3–11)	16 – Tied	10 – Jackson	4 – King	KSU Convocation Center (1,902); Kennesaw, GA
February 16, 2023; 6:00 pm, ESPN+		Queens	W 76–69	11–17 (4–11)	27 – King	7 – Platt	6 – King	Pete Mathews Coliseum (1,758); Jacksonville, AL
February 18, 2023; 4:00 pm, ESPN+		Liberty	L 55–79	11–18 (4–12)	9 – Tied	7 – Perdue	4 – Platt	Pete Mathews Coliseum (2,455); Jacksonville, AL
February 22, 2023; 7:00 pm, ESPN+		at Central Arkansas	W 101–71	12–18 (5–12)	35 – King	10 – Brigham Jr.	5 – King	Farris Center (968); Conway, AR
February 24, 2023; 6:00 pm, ESPN+		at North Alabama	W 92–83	13–18 (6–12)	29 – King	9 – Perdue	3 – King	Flowers Hall (2,133); Florence, AL
*Non-conference game. ^{#}Rankings from AP Poll. (#) Tournament seedings in parentheses. All times are in Central.
