= 2022–23 Queens Royals men's basketball team =

American college basketball season

2022–23 Queens Royals men's basketball

Jamaica Classic Rose Hall champions
- Conference: ASUN Conference
- Record: 18–15 (7–11 ASUN)
- Head coach: Grant Leonard (1st season)
- Assistant coaches: Charlie Wilson; Sean McClurg; Dan Bailey
- Home arena: Curry Arena

2022–23 ASUN men's basketball standings
	Conf.				Overall
Team	W		L	PCT	W		L	PCT
Kennesaw State †	15	–	3	.833	26	–	9	.743
Liberty	15	–	3	.833	27	–	9	.750
Eastern Kentucky	12	–	6	.667	23	–	14	.622
Stetson	12	–	6	.667	17	–	14	.548
Lipscomb	11	–	7	.611	20	–	13	.606
North Alabama	10	–	8	.556	18	–	15	.545
North Florida	9	–	9	.500	14	–	17	.452
Bellarmine*	9	–	9	.500	15	–	18	.455
Queens*	7	–	11	.389	18	–	15	.545
Florida Gulf Coast	7	–	11	.389	17	–	15	.531
Jacksonville	6	–	12	.333	13	–	16	.448
Jacksonville State	6	–	12	.333	13	–	18	.419
Central Arkansas	4	–	14	.222	9	–	22	.290
Austin Peay	3	–	15	.167	9	–	22	.290
† 2023 ASUN tournament winner * Ineligible for the 2023 NCAA tournament due to transition from Division II

The 2022–23 Queens Royals men's basketball team represented the Queens University of Charlotte in the 2022–23 NCAA Division I men's basketball season. The Lions, led by first-year head coach Grant Leonard, played their home games at Curry Arena in Charlotte, North Carolina, as first-year members of the ASUN Conference. They finished the season 18–15, 7–11 in ASUN play, to finish in a tie for ninth place. As the No. 9 seed in the ASUN tournament, they defeated Florida Gulf Coast before losing to Kennesaw State in the quarterfinals.

This season marked Queens' first year of a four-year transition period from Division II to Division I. As a result, the Royals were not eligible for NCAA postseason play until the 2026–27 season.

== Previous season ==
The Royals finished the 2021–22 NCAA Division II season 30–4, 21–3 in South Atlantic Conference play, to finish as SAC regular season co-champions. They defeated Catawba, Newberry and Carson–Newman to win the SAC tournament. They qualified for the DII NCAA tournament, where they defeated Columbus State and conference co-champion Lincoln Memorial before losing to eventual national runner-up Augusta in the Southeast Regional final.

On May 6, 2022, the school announced it would move to Division I as a member of the ASUN Conference.

== Roster ==
2022–23 Queens Royals men's basketball team
Players
Coaches

Pos.	#	Name	Height	Weight	Year	Hometown
F	1	Mike Fowler	6 ft 9 in (2.06 m)	240 lb (109 kg)	Jr	Raleigh, NC
F	2	Jay'Den Turner	6 ft 5 in (1.96 m)	205 lb (93 kg)	Jr	High Point, NC
G	3	Kalib Mathews	6 ft 4 in (1.93 m)	185 lb (84 kg)	So	Franklinton, NC
F	4	Gavin Rains	6 ft 7 in (2.01 m)	230 lb (104 kg)	Jr	Trinity, NC
G	5	AJ McKee	6 ft 2 in (1.88 m)	205 lb (93 kg)	So	Charlotte, NC
G/F	10	Quan McCluney	6 ft 5 in (1.96 m)	198 lb (90 kg)	Sr	Gastonia, NC
G	11	Chris Ashby	6 ft 2 in (1.88 m)	185 lb (84 kg)	So	Houston, TX
G	12	Logan Threatt	6 ft 3 in (1.91 m)	190 lb (86 kg)	Fr	Belmont, NC
G	13	Trey Hubbard	6 ft 3 in (1.91 m)	180 lb (82 kg)	So	Charlotte, NC
G	15	Kenny Dye	6 ft 0 in (1.83 m)	190 lb (86 kg)	Sr	Jacksonville, NC
F	22	Elijah Wyche	6 ft 6 in (1.98 m)	205 lb (93 kg)	Fr	Cooper City, FL
F	23	BJ McLaurin	6 ft 8 in (2.03 m)	230 lb (104 kg)	Jr	Fayetteville, NC
G	24	Jordan Smith	6 ft 6 in (1.98 m)	175 lb (79 kg)	Fr	Jacksonville, FL
F		Luke Krawczyk	6 ft 8 in (2.03 m)	220 lb (100 kg)	Fr	Fort Mill, SC

Head coach

- Grant Leonard (William Penn)

Assistant coach(es)

- Charlie Wilson (Central Methodist)
- Sean McClurg (Virginia Tech)
- Dan Bailey (Queens (NC))

Legend

- (C) Team captain
- (S) Suspended
- (I) Ineligible
- (W) Walk-on
- Injured
- Current redshirt

Roster
Last update: January 17, 2023

== Schedule and results ==
Date time, TV	Rank^{#}	Opponent^{#}	Result	Record	Site (attendance) city, state
Non-conference regular season
November 7, 2022*; 7:00 pm, ESPN+		Marshall	W 83–82	1–0	Curry Arena (1,608); Charlotte, NC
November 10, 2022*; 12:00 pm		Clinton	W 99–65	2–0	Curry Arena (813); Charlotte, NC
November 15, 2022*; 7:00 pm, ESPN+		at La Salle; Jamaica Classic campus site game	L 60–72	2–1	Tom Gola Arena (1,027); Philadelphia, PA
November 18, 2022*; 11:30 am, HBCU Go		vs. Green Bay; Jamaica Classic semifinals	W 81–65	3–1	Montego Bay Convention Centre; Montego Bay, Jamaica
November 20, 2022*; 5:00 pm, HBCU Go		vs. Morgan State; Jamaica Classic championship	W 74–64	4–1	Montego Bay Convention Centre; Montego Bay, Jamaica
November 23, 2022*; 6:00 pm, ESPN+		Lynchburg	W 107–72	5–1	Curry Arena (232); Charlotte, NC
November 26, 2022*; 2:00 pm, ESPN+		at George Mason	L 65–72	5–2	EagleBank Arena (2,460); Fairfax, VA
November 29, 2022*; 7:00 pm, ESPN+		at Bowling Green	W 72–66	6–2	Stroh Center (1,321); Bowling Green, OH
December 3, 2022*; 3:00 pm, ESPN+		Paine	W 80–69	7–2	Curry Arena (445); Charlotte, NC
December 9, 2022*; 7:00 pm, ESPN+		at High Point	W 87–79	8–2	Qubein Center (3,202); High Point, NC
December 14, 2022*; 7:00 pm, ESPN+		at East Tennessee State	W 78–75	9–2	Freedom Hall Civic Center (2,240); Johnson City, TN
December 20, 2022*; 7:30 pm, BTN+		at Nebraska; Battle in the Vault	L 65–75	9–3	Pinnacle Bank Arena (2,523); Lincoln, NE
December 22, 2022*; 7:00 pm, NEC Front Row		at Fairleigh Dickinson	W 82–73	10–3	Rothman Center (950); Hackensack, NJ
ASUN Conference regular season
December 29, 2022; 6:00 pm, ESPN+		Austin Peay	W 81–77	11–3 (1–0)	Curry Arena (552); Charlotte, NC
December 31, 2022; 6:00 pm, ESPN+		at Eastern Kentucky	L 83–88	11–4 (1–1)	Baptist Health Arena (2,577); Richmond, KY
January 5, 2023; 6:30 pm, ESPN+		at Bellarmine	W 75–74	12–4 (2–1)	Freedom Hall (1,743); Louisville, KY
January 7, 2023; 8:00 pm, ESPN+		Kennesaw State	L 67–76	12–5 (2–2)	Curry Arena (416); Charlotte, NC
January 12, 2023; 7:00 pm, ESPN+		Central Arkansas	L 91–92	12–6 (2–3)	Curry Arena (502); Charlotte, NC
January 14, 2023; 1:00 pm, ESPN+		North Alabama	W 107–78	13–6 (3–3)	Curry Arena (272); Charlotte, NC
January 19, 2023; 7:00 pm, ESPN+		at North Florida	L 90–95	13–7 (3–4)	UNF Arena (1,439); Jacksonville, FL
January 21, 2022; 4:00 pm, ESPN+		at Jacksonville	L 70–77	13–8 (3–5)	Swisher Gymnasium (942); Jacksonville, FL
January 26, 2023; 7:00 pm, ESPN+		Florida Gulf Coast	W 84–82	14–8 (4–5)	Curry Arena (403); Charlotte, NC
January 28, 2023; 1:00 pm, ESPN+		Stetson	W 71–65	15–8 (5–5)	Curry Arena (543); Charlotte, NC
February 2, 2023; 8:00 pm, ESPN+		at Lipscomb	L 60–66	15–9 (5–6)	Allen Arena (1,418); Nashville, TN
February 4, 2023; 4:00 pm, ESPN+		at Austin Peay	W 70–69	16–9 (6–6)	Dunn Center (1,872); Clarksville, TN
February 9, 2023; 7:00 pm, ESPN+		Eastern Kentucky	L 80–84	16–10 (6–7)	Curry Arena (423); Charlotte, NC
February 11, 2023; 1:00 pm, ESPN+		Bellarmine	L 84–88	16–11 (6–8)	Curry Arena (607); Charlotte, NC
February 16, 2023; 7:00 pm, ESPN+		at Jacksonville State	L 69–76	16–12 (6–9)	Pete Mathews Coliseum (1,758); Jacksonville, AL
February 18, 2023; 2:00 pm, ESPN+		at Kennesaw State	W 83–76	17–12 (7–9)	KSU Convocation Center (1,514); Kennesaw, GA
February 22, 2023; 7:00 pm, ESPN+		Liberty	L 77–85	17–13 (7–10)	Curry Arena (762); Charlotte, NC
February 24, 2023; 7:00 pm, ESPN+		at Liberty	L 53–73	17–14 (7–11)	Liberty Arena (4,041); Lynchburg, VA
ASUN tournament
February 27, 2023; 7:00 pm, ESPN+	(9)	vs. (10) Florida Gulf Coast; First round	W 61–55	18–14	KSU Convocation Center (123); Kennesaw, GA
February 28, 2023; 7:00 pm, ESPN+	(9)	at (1) Kennesaw State; Quarterfinals	L 66–67	18–15	KSU Convocation Center (2,322); Kennesaw, GA
*Non-conference game. ^{#}Rankings from AP poll. (#) Tournament seedings in parentheses. All times are in Eastern.
