= 2022–23 North Florida Ospreys men's basketball team =

American college basketball season

2022–23 North Florida Ospreys men's basketball
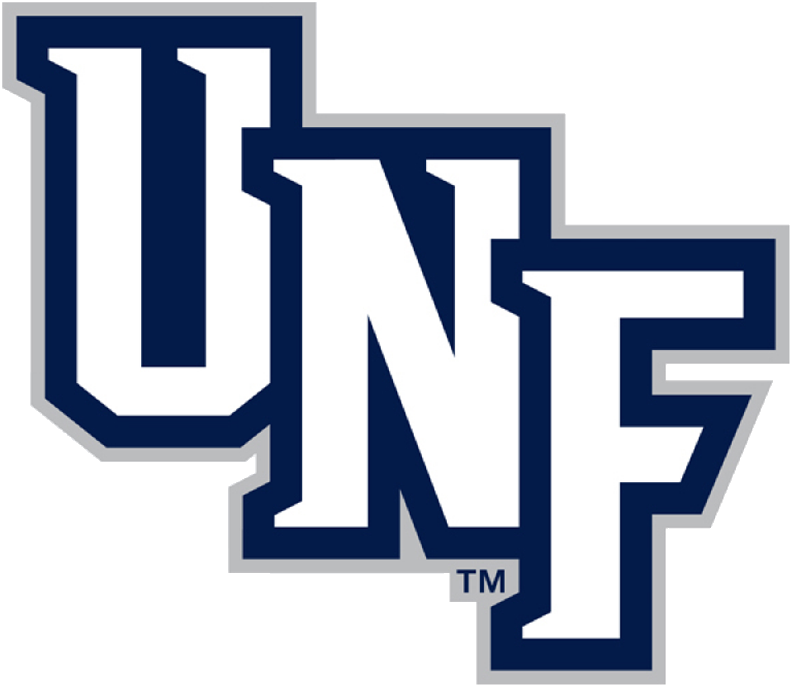
- Conference: ASUN Conference
- Record: 14–17 (9–9 ASUN)
- Head coach: Matthew Driscoll (14th season)
- Associate head coach: Bobby Kennen
- Assistant coaches: Bruce Evans; Stephen Perkins
- Home arena: UNF Arena

2022–23 ASUN men's basketball standings
| | Conf. | | | | Overall |
| Team | W | | L | PCT | W | | L | PCT |
|---|---|---|---|---|---|---|---|---|
| Kennesaw State † | 15 | – | 3 | .833 | 26 | – | 9 | .743 |
| Liberty | 15 | – | 3 | .833 | 27 | – | 9 | .750 |
| Eastern Kentucky | 12 | – | 6 | .667 | 23 | – | 14 | .622 |
| Stetson | 12 | – | 6 | .667 | 17 | – | 14 | .548 |
| Lipscomb | 11 | – | 7 | .611 | 20 | – | 13 | .606 |
| North Alabama | 10 | – | 8 | .556 | 18 | – | 15 | .545 |
| North Florida | 9 | – | 9 | .500 | 14 | – | 17 | .452 |
| Bellarmine* | 9 | – | 9 | .500 | 15 | – | 18 | .455 |
| Queens* | 7 | – | 11 | .389 | 18 | – | 15 | .545 |
| Florida Gulf Coast | 7 | – | 11 | .389 | 17 | – | 15 | .531 |
| Jacksonville | 6 | – | 12 | .333 | 13 | – | 16 | .448 |
| Jacksonville State | 6 | – | 12 | .333 | 13 | – | 18 | .419 |
| Central Arkansas | 4 | – | 14 | .222 | 9 | – | 22 | .290 |
| Austin Peay | 3 | – | 15 | .167 | 9 | – | 22 | .290 |
† 2023 ASUN tournament winner * Ineligible for the 2023 NCAA tournament due to transition from Division II

The 2022–23 North Florida Ospreys men's basketball team represented the University of North Florida in the 2022–23 NCAA Division I men's basketball season. The Ospreys, led by 14th-year head coach Matthew Driscoll, played their home games at the UNF Arena in Jacksonville, Florida as members of the ASUN Conference.

The Ospreys finished the season 14–17, 9–9 in ASUN play, to finish in a tie for seventh place. They were defeated by Bellarmine in the first round of the ASUN tournament.

== Previous season ==
The Ospreys finished the 2021–22 season 11–20, 7–9 in ASUN play, to finish in fifth place in the East Division. In the ASUN tournament, they were defeated by Lipscomb in the first round.

== Roster ==
2022–23 North Florida Ospreys men's basketball team
Players
Coaches

| Pos. | # | Name | Height | Weight | Year | Previous school | Hometown |
|---|---|---|---|---|---|---|---|
| G | 1 | Mark Flakus | 6 ft 1 in (1.85 m) | 170 lb (77 kg) | Fr | Episcopal School | Jacksonville, FL |
| G | 2 | Chaz Lanier | 6 ft 4 in (1.93 m) | 195 lb (88 kg) | So | The Ensworth School | Nashville, TN |
| G/F | 3 | Carter Hendricksen | 6 ft 7 in (2.01 m) | 215 lb (98 kg) | Sr | Lexington Christian Academy | Mt. Sterling, KY |
| F | 4 | Trent Coleman | 6 ft 7 in (2.01 m) | 195 lb (88 kg) | So | SW Mississippi CC | Ridgeland, MS |
| G/F | 5 | Dorian James | 6 ft 7 in (2.01 m) | 215 lb (98 kg) | RS Jr | Chain of Lakes Collegiate HS | Winter Haven, FL |
| G | 10 | Jarius Hicklen | 6 ft 3 in (1.91 m) | 170 lb (77 kg) | Jr | Oklahoma Baptist | Dallas, TX |
| G | 11 | Brandon Rasmussen | 6 ft 4 in (1.93 m) | 183 lb (83 kg) | So | Potters House Academy | Christiansted, U.S. Virgin Islands |
| G | 13 | Max Hrdlicka | 6 ft 6 in (1.98 m) | 208 lb (94 kg) | RS Fr | Glynn Academy | Brunswick, GA |
| G | 15 | Jose Placer | 6 ft 1 in (1.85 m) | 184 lb (83 kg) | RS Jr | UMBC | Orlando, FL |
| F | 21 | Jonathan Aybar | 6 ft 9 in (2.06 m) | 205 lb (93 kg) | So | Central Pointe Christian Academy | Kissimmee, FL |
| G | 23 | Jah Nze | 6 ft 4 in (1.93 m) | 222 lb (101 kg) | Fr | Hagerty HS | Oviedo, FL |
| F | 24 | Jadyn Parker | 6 ft 10 in (2.08 m) | 188 lb (85 kg) | So | West Brunswick HS | Shallotte, NC |
| G | 33 | Oscar Berry | 6 ft 4 in (1.93 m) | 188 lb (85 kg) | So | Fairleigh Dickinson | Melbourne, Australia |

Head coach

- Matthew Driscoll (Slippery Rock)

Assistant coach(es)

- Bobby Kennen (Palm Beach Atlantic)
- Bruce Evans (Furman)
- Stephen Perkins (Baylor)

Legend

- (C) Team captain
- (S) Suspended
- (I) Ineligible
- (W) Walk-on
- Injured
- Current redshirt

Roster
Last update: January 18, 2023

== Schedule and results ==
| Date time, TV | Rank^{#} | Opponent^{#} | Result | Record | Site (attendance) city, state |
Non-conference regular season
| November 7, 2022*; 7:00 p.m., RTNW | | at No. 2 Gonzaga | L 63–104 | 0–1 | McCarthey Athletic Center (6,000); Spokane, WA |
| November 11, 2022*; 8:00 p.m., P12N | | at Washington | L 67–75 | 0–2 | Alaska Airlines Arena (6,786); Seattle, WA |
| November 19, 2022*; 5:00 p.m., ESPN+ | | South Carolina State | W 72–66 | 1–2 | UNF Arena (2,159); Jacksonville, FL |
| November 21, 2022*; 7:00 p.m., ESPN+ | | at Duquesne | L 82–83 | 1–3 | UPMC Cooper Fieldhouse (2,018); Pittsburgh, PA |
| November 23, 2022*; 4:00 p.m., SECN+/ESPN+ | | at No. 15 Kentucky | L 56–96 | 1–4 | Rupp Arena (19,763); Lexington, KY |
| November 29, 2022*; 7:00 p.m., ESPN+ | | Trinity Baptist | W 90–49 | 2–4 | UNF Arena (1,659); Jacksonville, FL |
| December 3, 2022*; 2:00 p.m., ESPN+ | | at High Point | L 88–93 | 2–5 | Qubein Center (2,744); High Point, NC |
| December 6, 2022*; 7:00 p.m., ESPN+ | | at No. 1 Houston | L 42–76 | 2–6 | Fertitta Center (7,283); Houston, TX |
| December 10, 2022*; 2:00 p.m., ESPN+ | | Bethune–Cookman | W 88–48 | 3–6 | UNF Arena (1,409); Jacksonville, FL |
| December 17, 2022*; 1:00 p.m., ACCN | | at Pittsburgh | L 56–82 | 3–7 | Petersen Events Center (5,782); Pittsburgh, PA |
| December 19, 2022*; 7:00 p.m., ESPN+ | | Davis & Elkins | W 105–66 | 4–7 | UNF Arena (1,067); Jacksonville, FL |
| December 22, 2022*; 2:00 p.m., CatEye Network | | at Bethune–Cookman | W 87–85 | 5–7 | Moore Gymnasium (105); Daytona Beach, FL |
| December 29, 2022*; 7:00 p.m., ESPN+ | | Atlantis; Exhibition Game | W 92–60 | – | UNF Arena; Jacksonville, FL |
ASUN regular season
| December 31, 2022; 2:00 p.m., ESPN+ | | Austin Peay | W 90–85 ^{OT} | 6–7 (1–0) | UNF Arena (1,019); Jacksonville, FL |
| January 2, 2023; 7:30 p.m., ESPN+ | | at Stetson | L 62–68 | 6–8 (1–1) | Edmunds Center (575); DeLand, FL |
| January 5, 2023; 7:00 p.m., ESPN+ | | Kennesaw State | W 89–86 | 7–8 (2–1) | UNF Arena (1,042); Jacksonville, FL |
| January 7, 2023; 7:00 p.m., ESPN+ | | at Florida Gulf Coast | L 57–82 | 7–9 (2–2) | Alico Arena (2,375); Fort Myers, FL |
| January 12, 2023; 7:00 p.m., ESPN+ | | at Jacksonville State | L 63–72 | 7–10 (2–3) | Pete Mathews Coliseum (2,344); Jacksonville, AL |
| January 14, 2023; 2:00 p.m., ESPN+ | | at Kennesaw State | L 72–86 | 7–11 (2–4) | KSU Convocation Center (764); Kennesaw, GA |
| January 19, 2023; 7:00 p.m., ESPN+ | | Queens | W 95–90 | 8–11 (3–4) | UNF Arena (1,439); Jacksonville, FL |
| January 21, 2023; 2:00 p.m., ESPN+ | | Liberty | L 62–73 | 8–12 (3–5) | UNF Arena (1,559); Jacksonville, FL |
| January 26, 2022; 8:00 p.m., ESPN+ | | at Central Arkansas | L 85–88 ^{OT} | 8–13 (3–6) | Farris Center (1,485); Conway, AR |
| January 28, 2023; 6:00 p.m., ESPN+ | | at North Alabama | L 78–91 | 8–14 (3–7) | Flowers Hall (2,146); Florence, AL |
| February 2, 2023; 7:00 p.m., ESPN+ | | at Jacksonville | W 76–63 | 9–14 (4–7) | Swisher Gymnasium (1,203); Jacksonville, FL |
| February 4, 2023; 5:00 p.m., ESPN+ | | Jacksonville | W 65–58 | 10–14 (5–7) | UNF Arena (4,439); Jacksonville, FL |
| February 9, 2023; 7:00 p.m., ESPN+ | | Florida Gulf Coast | L 66–68 | 10–15 (5–8) | UNF Arena (1,589); Jacksonville, FL |
| February 11, 2023; 2:00 p.m., ESPN+ | | Stetson | W 92–81 | 11–15 (6–8) | UNF Arena (1,549); Jacksonville, FL |
| February 16, 2023; 8:00 p.m., ESPN+ | | at Lipscomb | W 114–111 ^{2OT} | 12–15 (7–8) | Allen Arena (1,782); Nashville, TN |
| February 18, 2023; 4:00 p.m., ESPN+ | | at Austin Peay | L 71–73 | 12–16 (7–9) | Dunn Center (1,975); Clarksville, TN |
| February 22, 2023; 7:00 p.m., ESPN+ | | Eastern Kentucky | W 77–64 | 13–16 (8–9) | UNF Arena (1,619); Jacksonville, FL |
| February 24, 2023; 7:00 p.m., ESPN+ | | Bellarmine | W 79–67 | 14–16 (9–9) | UNF Arena (1,889); Jacksonville, FL |
ASUN tournament
| February 27, 2023; 7:00 p.m., ESPN+ | (7) | vs. (8) Bellarmine; First round | L 74–76 | 14–17 | Liberty Arena (135); Lynchburg, VA |
*Non-conference game. ^{#}Rankings from AP poll. (#) Tournament seedings in parentheses. All times are in Eastern.
