= Tay Glover-Wright =

American football player (born 1992)

No. 24
- Position: Cornerback

Personal information
- Born: June 28, 1992 (age 34); Smyrna, Georgia, U.S.
- Listed height: 6 ft 0 in (1.83 m)
- Listed weight: 180 lb (82 kg)

Career information
- High school: Campbell (Smyrna)
- College: Utah State
- NFL draft: 2014: undrafted

Career history
- Atlanta Falcons (2014)*; Green Bay Packers (2014–2015)*; Indianapolis Colts (2015–2016); Philadelphia Eagles (2017)*; New York Giants (2017)*; Calgary Stampeders (2017–2018); Ottawa Redblacks (2019)*
- * Offseason or practice squad member only

Career NFL statistics
- Games played: 2
- Games started: 0
- Stats at Pro Football Reference
- Stats at CFL.ca

Devonta Montrell "Tay" Glover-Wright (born June 28, 1992) is an American former professional football player who was a cornerback for the Indianapolis Colts of the National Football League (NFL). He played college football at Highland, Eastern Arizona and Utah State. He was also a member of the Atlanta Falcons, Green Bay Packers, Indianapolis Colts, Philadelphia Eagles, New York Giants, Calgary Stampeders, and Ottawa Redblacks.

== Early life ==
Glover-Wright lettered as a sophomore and junior at Campbell High School in Smyrna, Georgia, where he played quarterback, wide receiver and safety. He earned all-county honors and helped the team advance to the playoffs twice. He played his senior season of high school football at Pebblebrook High School in Mableton, Georgia in 2009. He then transferred back to Campbell High School for the second semester. He graduated from Campbell High.

== College career ==
Glover-Wright was a quarterback and wide receiver for the Highland Scotties of Highland Community College in 2010 and the Eastern Arizona Gila Monsters of Eastern Arizona College in 2011. In 2011, he helped the Gila Monsters finish the year with an 8-4 record and a berth in the Top of the Mountains Bowl. He passed for 158 yards and 2 touchdowns, rushed for 684 yards and 1 touchdown, and caught 20 passes for 461 yards and 4 touchdowns over his two-year junior college career. He also returned 9 kicks for 243 yards and had a 98-yard touchdown return.

Glover-Wright then transferred to Utah State University, where he played for the Utah State Aggies from 2012 to 2013 as a cornerback. He played in 13 games, starting 1, in 2012 and recorded 17 tackles. He also blocked a punt. He spent time at quarterback in 2012 as well, accumulating season totals of 12 rushes for 66 yards and 1 pass completions for 9 yards.

He played in 14 games, starting ten, his senior year in 2013. He finished the year with totals of 52 tackles and 10 pass breakups. He also had 19 kickoff returns for 429 yards and 8 rushing attempts for 39 yards.

He appeared in 27 games, starting 11, during his time at Utah State and recorded career totals of 69 tackles, 10 pass breakups, 1 sack, 1 forced fumble and 1 fumble recovery. He had 105 rushing yards on 20 attempts as well. He graduated from Utah State in the spring of 2014 with a degree in interdisciplinary studies.

== Professional career ==
Pre-draft measurables
| Height | Weight | 40-yard dash | 10-yard split | 20-yard split | 20-yard shuttle | Three-cone drill | Vertical jump | Broad jump | Bench press |
|---|---|---|---|---|---|---|---|---|---|
| 6 ft 0 in (1.83 m) | 174 lb (79 kg) | 4.36 s | 1.50 s | 2.58 s | 4.37 s | 7.28 s | 35 in (0.89 m) | 9 ft 11 in (3.02 m) | 9 reps |
All values from Utah State Pro Day

=== Atlanta Falcons ===
Glover-Wright signed with the Atlanta Falcons in May 2014 after going undrafted in the 2014 NFL draft. He was released by the team on August 24, 2014.

=== Green Bay Packers ===
Glover-Wright was signed to the Green Bay Packers' practice squad on October 6, 2014. He signed a future contract with the Packers on January 20, 2015. He was released by the team on September 5, 2015.

=== Indianapolis Colts ===
Glover-Wright was signed to the Indianapolis Colts' practice squad on October 5, 2015. He was promoted to the active roster on December 17. He played in two games for the Colts during the 2015 season.

Glover-Wright was released by the Colts on September 3, 2016, and signed to the practice squad on September 14. He was released by the Colts on September 19, 2016.

=== Philadelphia Eagles ===
On July 31, 2017, Glover-Wright signed with the Philadelphia Eagles. He was waived on August 26, 2017.

=== New York Giants ===
On August 27, 2017, Glover-Wright was claimed off waivers by the New York Giants. He was waived on September 1, 2017.

=== Calgary Stampeders ===
On October 17, 2017, Glover-Wright was signed to the Calgary Stampeders' practice roster.

=== Ottawa Redblacks ===
Glover-Wright signed with the Ottawa Redblacks on December 13, 2018.

=== Statistics ===
Source: NFL.com

| Year | Team | G | GS | Tackles | | | | | Interceptions | | | | | | Fumbles | |
| Year | Team | G | GS | Total | Solo | Ast | Sck | SFTY | PDef | Int | Yds | Avg | Lng | TDs | FF | FR |
Regular season
| 2015 | IND | 2 | 0 | 0 | 0 | 0 | 0.0 | 0 | 0 | 0 | 0 | 0.0 | 0 | 0 | 0 | 0 |
| Total | | 2 | 0 | 0 | 0 | 0 | 0.0 | 0 | 0 | 0 | 0 | 0.0 | 0 | 0 | 0 | 0 |

== Personal life ==
Glover-Wright's uncle, Jeffrey Wright, played football at Georgia Tech from 1990 to 1993. Glover-Wright interned at Intermountain Physical Therapy during his senior year of college.
