= 2022–23 Jacksonville Dolphins men's basketball team =

American college basketball season

2022–23 Jacksonville Dolphins men's basketball
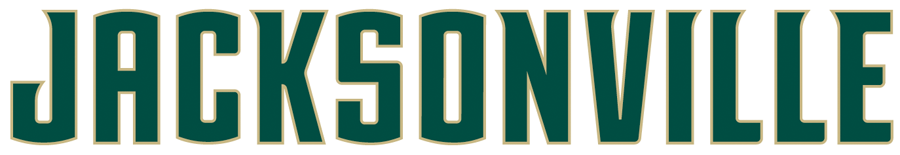
- Conference: ASUN Conference
- Record: 13–16 (6–12 ASUN)
- Head coach: Jordan Mincy (2nd season)
- Assistant coaches: Scott Cherry; Trevor Deloach; Troy Pierce
- Home arena: Swisher Gymnasium

2022–23 ASUN men's basketball standings
	Conf.				Overall
Team	W		L	PCT	W		L	PCT
Kennesaw State †	15	–	3	.833	26	–	9	.743
Liberty	15	–	3	.833	27	–	9	.750
Eastern Kentucky	12	–	6	.667	23	–	14	.622
Stetson	12	–	6	.667	17	–	14	.548
Lipscomb	11	–	7	.611	20	–	13	.606
North Alabama	10	–	8	.556	18	–	15	.545
North Florida	9	–	9	.500	14	–	17	.452
Bellarmine*	9	–	9	.500	15	–	18	.455
Queens*	7	–	11	.389	18	–	15	.545
Florida Gulf Coast	7	–	11	.389	17	–	15	.531
Jacksonville	6	–	12	.333	13	–	16	.448
Jacksonville State	6	–	12	.333	13	–	18	.419
Central Arkansas	4	–	14	.222	9	–	22	.290
Austin Peay	3	–	15	.167	9	–	22	.290
† 2023 ASUN tournament winner * Ineligible for the 2023 NCAA tournament due to transition from Division II

The 2022–23 Jacksonville Dolphins men's basketball team represented Jacksonville University in the 2022–23 NCAA Division I men's basketball season. The Dolphins, led by second-year head coach Jordan Mincy, played their home games at Swisher Gymnasium in Jacksonville, Florida as members of the ASUN Conference. They finished the season 13–16, 6–12 in ASUN play, to finish in a tie for 11th place. They failed to qualify for the ASUN tournament.

== Previous season ==
The Dolphins finished the 2021–22 season 21–10, 11–5 in ASUN play, to finish in second place in the East Division. They defeated Central Arkansas and Jacksonville State to advance to the ASUN tournament championship game. There they lost to Bellarmine.

== Roster ==
2022–23 Jacksonville Dolphins men's basketball team
Players
Coaches

Pos.	#	Name	Height	Weight	Year	Previous school	Hometown
F	0	Omar Payne	6 ft 10 in (2.08 m)	240 lb (109 kg)	RS Jr	Illinois	Kissimmee, FL
F	1	Oumar Koureissi	6 ft 11 in (2.11 m)	220 lb (100 kg)	RS So	Dodge City Community College	Harlem, NY
G	2	Dylan O'Hearn	6 ft 4 in (1.93 m)	195 lb (88 kg)	RS Sr	NJIT	Windsor, ON
G	3	Kevion Nolan	6 ft 2 in (1.88 m)	180 lb (82 kg)	RS Sr	Samford	Anniston, AL
F	5	Bryce Workman	6 ft 7 in (2.01 m)	230 lb (104 kg)	RS Sr	Sickles High School	Tampa, FL
G	10	Gyasi Powell	6 ft 3 in (1.91 m)	190 lb (86 kg)	RS So	Davis & Elkins College	Jacksonville, FL
G	11	Jordan Davis	6 ft 3 in (1.91 m)	195 lb (88 kg)	GS	Middle Tennessee	Irmo, SC
F	12	Mike Marsh	6 ft 11 in (2.11 m)	240 lb (109 kg)	RS Jr	Dodge City Community College	Columbia, SC
G	14	Carson Brown	6 ft 1 in (1.85 m)	175 lb (79 kg)	So	South Walton High School	Miramar Beach, FL
F	15	Osayi Osifo	6 ft 8 in (2.03 m)	230 lb (104 kg)	RS Sr	Florida	McKinney, TX
G	20	Jarius Cook	6 ft 3 in (1.91 m)	185 lb (84 kg)	RS Jr	North Dakota State	Brooklyn Park, MN
G	22	Jalen Nesmith	6 ft 0 in (1.83 m)	185 lb (84 kg)	RS Jr	Albany Tech	The Bronx, NY
G	23	Sejr Deans	6 ft 2 in (1.88 m)	205 lb (93 kg)	Fr	Launceston College	Launceston, Australia
G	30	Josiah Sabino	6 ft 4 in (1.93 m)	195 lb (88 kg)	Fr	Orange Park High School	Jacksonville, FL

Head coach

- Jordan Mincy (Kent State)

Assistant coach(es)

- Scott Cherry (North Carolina)
- Trevor Deloach (UNCW)
- Troy Pierce (Emporia State)

Legend

- (C) Team captain
- (S) Suspended
- (I) Ineligible
- (W) Walk-on
- Injured
- Current redshirt

Roster
Last update: November 29, 2022

== Schedule and results ==
Date time, TV	Rank^{#}	Opponent^{#}	Result	Record	Site (attendance) city, state
Non-conference regular season
November 7, 2022*; 7:00 p.m., ACCN		at No. 7 Duke	L 44–71	0–1	Cameron Indoor Stadium (9,314); Durham, NC
November 11, 2022*; 2:00 p.m., ESPN+		Johnson (FL)	W 85–34	1–1	Swisher Gymnasium (742); Jacksonville, FL
November 20, 2022*; 2:00 p.m., ESPN+		Voorhees	W 91–61	2–1	Swisher Gymnasium (860); Jacksonville, FL
November 23, 2022*; 4:00 p.m., ESPN+		at Campbell	W 64–43	3–1	Gore Arena (1,108); Buies Creek, NC
November 30, 2022*; 7:30 p.m., CUSA.tv		at UAB	L 61–80	3–2	Bartow Arena (3,303); Birmingham, AL
December 3, 2022*; 4:00 p.m., ESPN+		Trinity Baptist	W 74–39	4–2	Swisher Gymnasium (175); Jacksonville, FL
December 7, 2022*; 7:00 p.m., ESPN+		at VCU	W 73–62	5–2	Siegel Center (7,015); Richmond, VA
December 10, 2022*; 4:00 p.m., FloHoops		at UNC Wilmington	L 53–81	5–3	Trask Coliseum (3,055); Wilmington, NC
December 17, 2022*; 4:00 p.m., ESPN+		Charleston Southern	W 72–63	6–3	Swisher Gymnasium (827); Jacksonville, FL
December 20, 2022*; 12:30 p.m., ESPN+		at Louisiana–Monroe	W 66–55	7–3	Fant–Ewing Coliseum (828); Monroe, LA
December 27, 2022*; 7:00 p.m., ACCN		at Notre Dame	L 43–59	7–4	Joyce Center (6,151); South Bend, IN
ASUN regular season
December 31, 2022; 1:00 p.m., ESPN+		at Florida Gulf Coast	L 65–72	7–5 (0–1)	Alico Arena (2,034); Fort Myers, FL
January 2, 2023; 7:00 p.m., ESPN+		Jacksonville State	W 62–46	8–5 (1–1)	Swisher Gymnasium (802); Jacksonville, FL
January 5, 2022; 7:00 p.m., ESPN+		at Stetson	L 61–73	8–6 (1–2)	Edmunds Center (510); DeLand, FL
January 7, 2023; 6:00 p.m., ESPN+		Lipscomb	W 51–44	9–6 (2–2)	Swisher Gymnasium (1,333); Jacksonville, FL
January 12, 2023; 7:00 p.m., ESPN+		at Kennesaw State	L 68–81	9–7 (2–3)	KSU Convocation Center (1,547); Kennesaw, GA
January 14, 2023; 5:00 p.m., ESPN+		at Jacksonville State	W 68–62	10–7 (3–3)	Pete Mathews Coliseum (2,289); Jacksonville, AL
January 19, 2023; 7:00 p.m., ESPN+		Liberty	L 52–66	10–8 (3–4)	Swisher Gymnasium (1,014); Jacksonville, FL
January 21, 2023; 4:00 p.m., ESPN+		Queens	W 77–70	11–8 (4–4)	Swisher Gymnasium (942); Jacksonville, FL
January 26, 2023; 7:00 p.m., ESPN+		at North Alabama	L 62–80	11–9 (4–5)	Flowers Hall (1,743); Florence, AL
January 28, 2023; 4:00 p.m., ESPN+		at Central Arkansas	W 74–64	12–9 (5–5)	Farris Center (1,543); Conway, AR
February 2, 2023; 7:00 p.m., ESPN+		North Florida	L 63–76	12–10 (5–6)	Swisher Gymnasium (1,203); Jacksonville, FL
February 4, 2023; 5:00 p.m., ESPN+		at North Florida	L 58–65	12–11 (5–7)	UNF Arena (4,439); Jacksonville, FL
February 9, 2023; 7:00 p.m., ESPN+		Stetson	L 67–70	12–12 (5–8)	Swisher Gymnasium (727); Jacksonville, FL
February 11, 2023; 4:00 p.m., ESPN+		Florida Gulf Coast	L 51–62	12–13 (5–9)	Swisher Gymnasium (1,087); Jacksonville, FL
February 16, 2023; 8:00 p.m., ESPN+		at Austin Peay	W 60–56	13–13 (6–9)	Dunn Center (1,497); Clarksville, TN
February 18, 2023; 5:00 p.m., ESPN+		at Lipscomb	L 59–62	13–14 (6–10)	Allen Arena (1,726); Nashville, TN
February 22, 2023; 5:00 p.m., ESPNU		Bellarmine	L 61–63	13–15 (6–11)	Swisher Gymnasium (1,073); Jacksonville, FL
February 24, 2023; 7:00 p.m., ESPN+		Eastern Kentucky	L 52–56	13–16 (6–12)	Swisher Gymnasium (804); Jacksonville, FL
*Non-conference game. ^{#}Rankings from AP poll. (#) Tournament seedings in parentheses. All times are in Eastern.
