= 2022–23 Stetson Hatters men's basketball team =

American college basketball season

2022–23 Stetson Hatters men's basketball
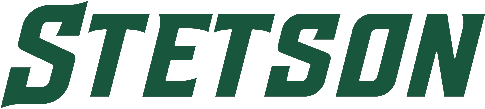

CBI, first round
- Conference: ASUN Conference
- Record: 17–14 (12–6 ASUN)
- Head coach: Donnie Jones (4th season)
- Assistant coaches: Shawn Finney; Jonathan Mitchell; Brett Comer
- Home arena: Edmunds Center

2022–23 ASUN men's basketball standings
	Conf.				Overall
Team	W		L	PCT	W		L	PCT
Kennesaw State †	15	–	3	.833	26	–	9	.743
Liberty	15	–	3	.833	27	–	9	.750
Eastern Kentucky	12	–	6	.667	23	–	14	.622
Stetson	12	–	6	.667	17	–	14	.548
Lipscomb	11	–	7	.611	20	–	13	.606
North Alabama	10	–	8	.556	18	–	15	.545
North Florida	9	–	9	.500	14	–	17	.452
Bellarmine*	9	–	9	.500	15	–	18	.455
Queens*	7	–	11	.389	18	–	15	.545
Florida Gulf Coast	7	–	11	.389	17	–	15	.531
Jacksonville	6	–	12	.333	13	–	16	.448
Jacksonville State	6	–	12	.333	13	–	18	.419
Central Arkansas	4	–	14	.222	9	–	22	.290
Austin Peay	3	–	15	.167	9	–	22	.290
† 2023 ASUN tournament winner * Ineligible for the 2023 NCAA tournament due to transition from Division II

The 2022–23 Stetson Hatters men's basketball team represented Stetson University in the 2022–23 NCAA Division I men's basketball season. The Hatters, led by fourth-year head coach Donnie Jones, played their home games at the Edmunds Center in DeLand, Florida as members of the ASUN Conference. They finished the season 17–13, 12–6 in ASUN play, to finish in fourth place. They lost in the quarterfinals of the ASUN tournament to Lipscomb. Stetson received an invitation to play in the CBI, where they lost in overtime to Milwaukee in the first round. The 2022–23 season marked the Hatters' first winning record since the 2000–01 season.

== Previous season ==
The Hatters finished the 2021–22 season 11–19, 5–11 in ASUN play, to finish in last place in the East division. They lost in the first round of the ASUN tournament to Central Arkansas.

== Roster ==
2022–23 Stetson Hatters men's basketball team
Players
Coaches

Pos.	#	Name	Height	Weight	Year	Previous school	Hometown
G	0	Alec Oglesby	6 ft 5 in (1.96 m)	200 lb (91 kg)	Jr	UNC Wilmington	Gainesville, FL
G/F	1	Wheza Panzo	6 ft 7 in (2.01 m)	200 lb (91 kg)	Sr	The Potter's House (FL)	Mississauga, ON
G	2	Sam Peek	6 ft 7 in (2.01 m)	200 lb (91 kg)	GS	Wesleyan	Poughkeepsie, NY
G	3	Giancarlo Valdez	6 ft 3 in (1.91 m)	186 lb (84 kg)	Jr	Decatur Heritage Christian Academy	Santo Domingo, Dominican Republic
G	5	Jalen Blackmon	6 ft 3 in (1.91 m)	181 lb (82 kg)	So	Grand Canyon	Marion, IN
G	10	Cyncier Harrison	5 ft 11 in (1.8 m)	161 lb (73 kg)	RS Fr	New Faith Christian Academy	Greenville, GA
F	11	Josh Smith	6 ft 8 in (2.03 m)	217 lb (98 kg)	Jr	Monrovia HS	Monrovia, IN
G	14	Jackson Huxtable	6 ft 6 in (1.98 m)	185 lb (84 kg)	Fr	Montverde Academy	Sydney, Australia
F/C	15	Mahamadou Diawara	6 ft 10 in (2.08 m)	250 lb (113 kg)	Sr	Massanutten Military Academy	Bamako, Mali
F/C	21	Aubin Gateretse	6 ft 11 in (2.11 m)	215 lb (98 kg)	So	Calusa Prep School	Charleroi, Belgium
G	25	Luke Brown	6 ft 1 in (1.85 m)	175 lb (79 kg)	So	Ball State	Carmel, IN
G	30	Stephan Swenson	6 ft 2 in (1.88 m)	190 lb (86 kg)	Jr	Westminster Academy	Brussels, Belgium
F/C	35	Alvin Tumblin	6 ft 7 in (2.01 m)	205 lb (93 kg)	So	Santa Fe Catholic HS	Sebring, FL

Head coach

- Donnie Jones (Pikeville)

Assistant coach(es)

- Shawn Finney (Fairmont State)
- Jonathan Mitchell (Rutgers)
- Brett Comer (Florida Gulf Coast)

Legend

- (C) Team captain
- (S) Suspended
- (I) Ineligible
- (W) Walk-on
- Injured
- Current redshirt

Roster
Last update: January 17, 2023

== Schedule and results ==
Date time, TV	Rank^{#}	Opponent^{#}	Result	Record	Site (attendance) city, state
Exhibition
October 25, 2022*; 7:00 p.m., ESPN+		Tampa	W 78–70	–	Edmunds Center (150); DeLand, FL
November 1, 2022*; 7:00 p.m., ESPN+		Saint Leo	W 54–53	–	Edmunds Center (255); DeLand, FL
Non-conference regular season
November 7, 2022*; 7:00 p.m., ACCN		at Florida State	W 83–74	1–0	Donald L. Tucker Civic Center (6,729); Tallahassee, FL
November 14, 2022*; 7:00 p.m., ESPN+		at South Florida	W 68–67	2–0	Yuengling Center (2,369); Tampa, FL
November 18, 2022*; 5:00 a.m., ESPNU		vs. Rider; ASUN/MAAC Dublin Basketball Challenge	W 78–68	3–0	National Basketball Arena; Dublin, Ireland
November 19, 2022*; 1:00 p.m., ESPN+		vs. Niagara; ASUN/MAAC Dublin Basketball Challenge	L 62–66	3–1	National Basketball Arena; Dublin, Ireland
November 27, 2022*; 1:00 p.m., ESPN+		at Campbell	L 85–87 ^{OT}	3–2	Gore Arena (1,029); Buies Creek, NC
November 29, 2022*; 7:00 p.m., ESPN+		Johnson (FL); Rescheduled from November 10	W 125–51	4–2	Edmunds Center (425); DeLand, FL
December 4, 2022*; 2:00 p.m., ESPN+		at Florida	L 51–89	4–3	O'Connell Center (7,087); Gainesville, FL
December 10, 2022*; 2:00 p.m., ESPN+		Webber International	W 83–59	5–3	Edmunds Center (400); DeLand, FL
December 14, 2022*; 7:00 p.m., FloHoops		at College of Charleston	L 60–65	5–4	TD Arena (3,632); Charleston, SC
December 17, 2022*; 2:00 p.m., ESPN+		at Ohio	L 66–85	5–5	Convocation Center (3,051); Athens, OH
December 21, 2022*; 7:00 p.m., ESPN+		at UCF	L 58–73	5–6	Addition Financial Arena (4,124); Orlando, FL
ASUN regular season
December 30, 2022; 3:00 p.m., ESPN+		at Lipscomb	W 86–80	6–6 (1–0)	Allen Arena (1,204); Nashville, TN
January 2, 2023; 7:30 p.m., ESPN+		North Florida	W 68–62	7–6 (2–0)	Edmunds Center (575); DeLand, FL
January 5, 2023; 7:00 p.m., ESPN+		Jacksonville	W 73–61	8–6 (3–0)	Edmunds Center (510); DeLand, FL
January 7, 2023; 8:15 p.m., ESPN+		at North Alabama	W 95–85 ^{OT}	9–6 (4–0)	Flowers Hall (870); Florence, AL
January 12, 2023; 6:30 p.m., ESPN+		at Bellarmine	W 80–51	10–6 (5–0)	Freedom Hall (1,942); Louisville, KY
January 14, 2023; 3:00 p.m., ESPN+		at Eastern Kentucky	L 70–85	10–7 (5–1)	Baptist Health Arena (3,592); Richmond, KY
January 19, 2023; 7:00 p.m., ESPN+		Kennesaw State	L 81–82 ^{OT}	10–8 (5–2)	Edmunds Center (929); DeLand, FL
January 21, 2023; 2:00 p.m., ESPN+		Jacksonville State	W 87–81	11–8 (6–2)	Edmunds Center (675); DeLand, FL
January 26, 2023; 7:00 p.m., ESPN+		at Liberty	L 45–74	11–9 (6–3)	Liberty Arena (3,591); Lynchburg, VA
January 28, 2023; 1:00 p.m., ESPN+		at Queens	L 65–71	11–10 (6–4)	Curry Arena (543); Charlotte, NC
February 2, 2023; 7:00 p.m., ESPN+		North Alabama	W 79–57	12–10 (7–4)	Edmunds Center (700); DeLand, FL
February 4, 2023; 2:00 p.m., ESPN+		Central Arkansas	W 99–80	13–10 (8–4)	Edmunds Center (625); DeLand, FL
February 9, 2023; 7:00 p.m., ESPN+		at Jacksonville	W 70–67	14–10 (9–4)	Swisher Gymnasium (727); Jacksonville, FL
February 11, 2023; 2:00 p.m., ESPN+		at North Florida	L 81–92	14–11 (9–5)	UNF Arena (1,549); Jacksonville, FL
February 15, 2023; 7:00 p.m., ESPN+		Florida Gulf Coast	W 75–72	15–11 (10–5)	Edmunds Center (903); DeLand, FL
February 18, 2023; 6:00 p.m., ESPN+		at Florida Gulf Coast	W 88–84	16–11 (11–5)	Alico Arena (2,139); Fort Myers, FL
February 22, 2023; 7:00 p.m., ESPN+		Austin Peay	W 76–51	17–11 (12–5)	Edmunds Center (650); DeLand, FL
February 24, 2023; 7:00 p.m., ESPN+		Lipscomb	L 91–98 ^{OT}	17–12 (12–6)	Edmunds Center (678); DeLand, FL
ASUN tournament
February 28, 2023; 7:00 p.m., ESPN+	(4)	(5) Lipscomb; Quarterfinals	L 70–83	17–13	Edmunds Center (671); DeLand, FL
College Basketball Invitational
March 19, 2023; 7:30 p.m., FloHoops	(6)	vs. (11) Milwaukee; First round	L 83–87 ^{OT}	17–14	Ocean Center (922); Daytona Beach, FL
*Non-conference game. ^{#}Rankings from AP poll. (#) Tournament seedings in parentheses. All times are in Eastern.
