= Anthony Boone (basketball) =

American basketball player and coach (born 1976)

Current position
- Title: Head coach
- Team: Hendrix Warriors
- Conference: SAA
- Record: 2–24

Biographical details
- Born: June 14, 1976 (age 50); West Helena, Arkansas, U.S.

Playing career
- 1994–1998: Ole Miss

Coaching career (HC unless noted)
- 1998–2000: Ole Miss (GA)
- 2000–2003: Murray State (assistant)
- 2003–2009: Jackson State (assistant)
- 2009–2013: Grand Canyon (assistant)
- 2013–2014: Phoenix Mercury (assistant)
- 2014–2019: Central Arkansas (assistant)
- 2019–2024: Central Arkansas
- 2024–present: Hendrix

Head coaching record
- Overall: 45–120 (.273)

Anthony Lynn Boone (born June 14, 1976) is an American college basketball coach and former player who is the head coach for the Hendrix Warriors men's basketball team. He was previously the head coach of the Central Arkansas Bears men's basketball team from 2019 to 2024.

== Playing career ==
Boone played college basketball at Ole Miss, where he was a 1995 SEC All-Rookie selection. His career was hampered by injuries, but during his senior season he was nominated for the Chip Hilton Player of the Year Award, and was inducted into the Ole Miss Hall of Fame as well as having his number 41 jersey retired. At the time, Boone's jersey joined Archie Manning as the only two jerseys retired in Ole Miss history.

== Coaching career ==
After graduation, Boone stayed on with Ole Miss under Rod Barnes as a graduate assistant before moving on to Murray State as an assistant coach under Tevester Anderson for three seasons. He'd follow Anderson to Jackson State and stay for six seasons until joining the staff of Grand Canyon, then an NCAA Division II under his former Ole Miss assistant Russ Pennell. After the 2014 season, Boone would follow Pennell again as he became head coach of the WNBA's Phoenix Mercury for a short spell in 2013.

When Pennell landed the Central Arkansas job, Boone joined him once more as an assistant coach. After a 1–8 start to the 2019–20 season, Pennell took a leave of absence in December 2019 and eventually resigned in January 2020, with Boone taking over on an interim basis. After guiding the Bears to a 9–13 record the remainder of the season, he was named the permanent head coach on March 9, 2020. On March 2, 2024, Boone was relieved from his duties after 4+ seasons at UCA.

On April 23, 2024, Boone was named the head men's basketball coach for the Hendrix Warriors.

=== Head coaching record ===
Record table
Season	Team	Overall	Conference	Standing	Postseason
Central Arkansas Bears (Southland Conference) (2019–2021)
2019–20	Central Arkansas	9–12	9–11	9th	
2020–21	Central Arkansas	5–19	4–12	11th	
Central Arkansas Bears (ASUN Conference) (2021–2024)
2021–22	Central Arkansas	11–20	7–9	3rd (West)	
2022–23	Central Arkansas	9–22	4–14	13th	
2023–24	Central Arkansas	9–23	5–11	T–10th	
Central Arkansas:		43–96 (.309)	29–57 (.337)		
Hendrix Warriors (Southern Athletic Association) (2024–present)
2024–25	Hendrix	2–24	0–12	7th	
Hendrix:		2–24 (.077)	0–12 (.000)		
Total:		45–120 (.273)			
