= 2022–23 Central Arkansas Bears basketball team =

American college basketball season

2022–23 Central Arkansas Bears basketball
- Conference: ASUN Conference
- Record: 9–22 (4–14 ASUN)
- Head coach: Anthony Boone (3rd season)
- Assistant coaches: Jeff Price; Brock Widders; John Cranford
- Home arena: Farris Center (Capacity: 6,000)

2022–23 ASUN men's basketball standings
	Conf.				Overall
Team	W		L	PCT	W		L	PCT
Kennesaw State †	15	–	3	.833	26	–	9	.743
Liberty	15	–	3	.833	27	–	9	.750
Eastern Kentucky	12	–	6	.667	23	–	14	.622
Stetson	12	–	6	.667	17	–	14	.548
Lipscomb	11	–	7	.611	20	–	13	.606
North Alabama	10	–	8	.556	18	–	15	.545
North Florida	9	–	9	.500	14	–	17	.452
Bellarmine*	9	–	9	.500	15	–	18	.455
Queens*	7	–	11	.389	18	–	15	.545
Florida Gulf Coast	7	–	11	.389	17	–	15	.531
Jacksonville	6	–	12	.333	13	–	16	.448
Jacksonville State	6	–	12	.333	13	–	18	.419
Central Arkansas	4	–	14	.222	9	–	22	.290
Austin Peay	3	–	15	.167	9	–	22	.290
† 2023 ASUN tournament winner * Ineligible for the 2023 NCAA tournament due to transition from Division II

The 2022–23 Central Arkansas Bears basketball team represented the University of Central Arkansas (UCA) in the 2022–23 NCAA Division I men's basketball season. The Bears, led by third-year head coach Anthony Boone, played their home games at the on-campus Farris Center in Conway, Arkansas as members of the ASUN Conference. They finished the season 9–22, 4–14 in ASUN play to finish in 13th place. They failed to qualify for the ASUN tournament.

== Previous season ==
The Bears finished the 2021–22 season 11–20, 7–9 in ASUN play to finish in third place in the West Division. In the ASUN tournament, they defeated Stetson in the first round, before losing to Jacksonville in the quarterfinals.

== Roster ==
2022–23 Central Arkansas Bears men's basketball team
Players
Coaches

Pos.	#	Name	Height	Weight	Year	Hometown
G/F	0	Sawyer Keith	6 ft 4 in (1.93 m)	175 lb (79 kg)	Fr	Fayetteville, Arkansas
G	2	Lewis McDaniel	6 ft 3 in (1.91 m)	180 lb (82 kg)	Jr	Nashville, Tennessee
G	3	VJ Reeves	6 ft 5 in (1.96 m)	200 lb (91 kg)	RS Fr	Tuscaloosa, Alabama
G	5	Masai Olowokere	6 ft 5 in (1.96 m)	195 lb (88 kg)	Jr	Brooklyn, New York
G/F	10	Ibbe Klintman	6 ft 8 in (2.03 m)	200 lb (91 kg)	So	Malmö, Sweden
G	11	Carl Daughtery Jr.	6 ft 3 in (1.91 m)	170 lb (77 kg)	Fr	Maumelle, Arkansas
G	12	Trey South	6 ft 3 in (1.91 m)	170 lb (77 kg)	So	Spring, Texas
G/F	13	Eddy Kayouloud	6 ft 7 in (2.01 m)	230 lb (104 kg)	Sr	Paris, France
G	14	Collin Cooper	6 ft 2 in (1.88 m)	190 lb (86 kg)	Jr	Fayetteville, Arkansas
G	20	Brendan Simmons	6 ft 2 in (1.88 m)	195 lb (88 kg)	So	El Dorado, Arkansas
C	21	Jonas Munson	7 ft 0 in (2.13 m)	220 lb (100 kg)	So	Alexandria, Virginia
G	22	Johannes Kirsipuu	6 ft 2 in (1.88 m)	186 lb (84 kg)	Fr	Sulu, Estonia
G	23	Camren Hunter	6 ft 3 in (1.91 m)	200 lb (91 kg)	So	Bryant, Arkansas
F	24	Johan Crafoord	6 ft 9 in (2.06 m)	230 lb (104 kg)	So	Stockholm, Sweden
G/F	25	Elias Cato	6 ft 8 in (2.03 m)	200 lb (91 kg)	So	Queensland, Australia
C	32	Churchill Bounds	6 ft 10 in (2.08 m)	260 lb (118 kg)	So	Cumberland, Maryland

Head coach

- Anthony Boone (Mississippi)

Assistant coach(es)

- Jeff Price (Marshall)
- Brock Widders (Lyon)
- John Cranford (Liberty)

Legend

- (C) Team captain
- (S) Suspended
- (I) Ineligible
- (W) Walk-on
- Injured
- Current redshirt

Roster
Last update: January 19, 2023

== Schedule and results ==
Date time, TV	Rank^{#}	Opponent^{#}	Result	Record	Site (attendance) city, state
Exhibition
November 1, 2022*; 7:00 p.m.		Champion Christian	W 115–79	–	Farris Center (582); Conway, AR
Non-conference regular season
November 7, 2022*; 7:00 pm, ESPN+		at Wichita State	L 55–79	0–1	Charles Koch Arena (6,954); Wichita, KS
November 11, 2022*; 5:30 pm		Hendrix	W 107–56	1–1	Farris Center (1,527); Conway, AR
November 14, 2022*; 7:00 pm, ESPN+		Little Rock; Governor's I-40 Showdown	W 82–71	2–1	Farris Center (1,945); Conway, AR
November 18, 2022*; 10:00 am, ESPN+		vs. Niagara; ASUN/MAAC Dublin Basketball Challenge	L 64–73	2–2	National Basketball Arena; Dublin, Ireland
November 19, 2022*; 5:00 am, ESPN+		vs. Rider; ASUN/MAAC Dublin Basketball Challenge	W 90–85	3–2	National Basketball Arena; Dublin, Ireland
November 26, 2022*; 5:30 pm, ESPN+		Northwestern State; Central Arkansas Classic	L 66–74	3–3	Farris Center (1,575); Conway, AR
November 27, 2022*; 3:30 pm, ESPN+		Idaho State; Central Arkansas Classic	W 81–77	4–3	Farris Center (1,157); Conway, AR
November 30, 2022*; 8:00 pm, ESPN+		at Loyola Chicago	L 70–85	4–4	Joseph J. Gentile Arena (3,003); Chicago, IL
December 6, 2022*; 7:00 pm, ESPN+		Arkansas State	W 72–67	5–4	Farris Center (2,385); Conway, AR
December 10, 2022*; 7:00 pm		at Oral Roberts	L 78–111	5–5	Mabee Center (3,897); Tulsa, OK
December 17, 2022*; 2:00 pm, ESPN+		at Oklahoma	L 66–87	5–6	Lloyd Noble Center (4,559); Norman, OK
December 20, 2022*; 6:30 pm, ESPN+		at Little Rock; Governor's I-40 Showdown	L 66–75	5–7	Jack Stephens Center (2,766); Little Rock, AR
December 28, 2022*; 4:00 pm, ESPN+		at No. 18 TCU	L 57–103	5–8	Schollmaier Arena (5,387); Fort Worth, TX
ASUN Conference regular season
December 31, 2022; 1:00 pm, ESPN+		at Kennesaw State	L 66–82	5–9 (0–1)	KSU Convocation Center (688); Kennesaw, GA
January 2, 2023; 7:30 pm, ESPN+		Florida Gulf Coast	L 79–84 ^{OT}	5–10 (0–2)	Farris Center (367); Conway, AR
January 5, 2023; 7:00 pm, ESPN+		Eastern Kentucky	L 75–77	5–11 (0–3)	Farris Center (545); Conway, AR
January 7, 2023; 4:30 pm, ESPN+		at Austin Peay	L 62–86	5–12 (0–4)	Dunn Center (1,133); Clarksville, TN
January 12, 2023; 6:00 pm, ESPN+		at Queens	W 92–91	6–12 (1–4)	Curry Arena (502); Charlotte, NC
January 14, 2023; 6:00 pm, ESPN+		at Liberty	L 62–82	6–13 (1–5)	Liberty Arena (3,648); Lynchburg, VA
January 18, 2023; 7:00 pm, ESPN+		North Alabama	L 73–78	6–14 (1–6)	Farris Center (1,453); Conway, AR
January 21, 2023; 7:15 pm, ESPN+		at North Alabama	L 66–82	6–15 (1–7)	Flowers Hall (1,870); Florence, AL
January 26, 2023; 7:00 pm, ESPN+		North Florida	W 88–85 ^{OT}	7–15 (2–7)	Farris Center (1,485); Conway, AR
January 28, 2023; 3:00 pm, ESPN+		Jacksonville	L 64–74	7–16 (2–8)	Farris Center (1,543); Conway, AR
February 2, 2023; 6:00 pm, ESPN+		at Florida Gulf Coast	W 91–87	8–16 (3–8)	Alico Arena (1,813); Fort Myers, FL
February 4, 2023; 1:00 pm, ESPN+		at Stetson	L 80–99	8–17 (3–9)	Edmunds Center (625); DeLand, FL
February 9, 2023; 7:30 pm, ESPN+		Lipscomb	L 81–93	8–18 (3–10)	Farris Center (1,025); Conway, AR
February 11, 2023; 3:00 pm, ESPN+		Austin Peay	W 76–69	9–18 (4–10)	Farris Center (1,448); Conway, AR
February 16, 2023; 6:30 pm, ESPN+		at Eastern Kentucky	L 58–74	9–19 (4–11)	Baptist Health Arena (3,412); Richmond, KY
February 19, 2023; 3:00 pm, ESPN+		at Bellarmine	L 67–68	9–20 (4–12)	Freedom Hall (3,056); Louisville, KY
February 22, 2023; 7:00 pm, ESPN+		Jacksonville State	L 71–101	9–21 (4–13)	Farris Center (968); Conway, AR
February 24, 2022; 7:00 pm, ESPN+		Kennesaw State	L 56–72	9–22 (4–14)	Farris Center (1,248); Conway, AR
*Non-conference game. ^{#}Rankings from AP Poll. (#) Tournament seedings in parentheses. All times are in Central.
