= 2022–23 Lipscomb Bisons men's basketball team =

American college basketball season

2022–23 Lipscomb Bisons men's basketball
- Conference: ASUN Conference
- Record: 20–13 (11–7 ASUN)
- Head coach: Lennie Acuff (4th season)
- Assistant coaches: Kevin Carroll; Roger Idstrom; Tyler Murray
- Home arena: Allen Arena

2022–23 ASUN men's basketball standings
	Conf.				Overall
Team	W		L	PCT	W		L	PCT
Kennesaw State †	15	–	3	.833	26	–	9	.743
Liberty	15	–	3	.833	27	–	9	.750
Eastern Kentucky	12	–	6	.667	23	–	14	.622
Stetson	12	–	6	.667	17	–	14	.548
Lipscomb	11	–	7	.611	20	–	13	.606
North Alabama	10	–	8	.556	18	–	15	.545
North Florida	9	–	9	.500	14	–	17	.452
Bellarmine*	9	–	9	.500	15	–	18	.455
Queens*	7	–	11	.389	18	–	15	.545
Florida Gulf Coast	7	–	11	.389	17	–	15	.531
Jacksonville	6	–	12	.333	13	–	16	.448
Jacksonville State	6	–	12	.333	13	–	18	.419
Central Arkansas	4	–	14	.222	9	–	22	.290
Austin Peay	3	–	15	.167	9	–	22	.290
† 2023 ASUN tournament winner * Ineligible for the 2023 NCAA tournament due to transition from Division II

The 2022–23 Lipscomb Bisons men's basketball team represented Lipscomb University in the 2022–23 NCAA Division I men's basketball season. The Bisons, led by fourth-year head coach Lennie Acuff, played their home games at the Allen Arena in Nashville, Tennessee as members of the ASUN Conference.

The Bisons finished the season 20–13, 11–7 in ASUN play, to finish in fifth place. They defeated Stetson in the quarterfinals of the ASUN tournament, before falling to Kennesaw State in the semifinals.

== Previous season ==
The Bisons finished the 2021–22 season 14–19, 6–10 in ASUN play, to finish in fourth place in the West Division. In the ASUN tournament, they defeated North Florida in the first round before losing to Liberty in the quarterfinals.

== Roster ==
2022–23 Lipscomb Bisons men's basketball team
Players
Coaches

Pos.	#	Name	Height	Weight	Year	Previous school	Hometown
G	0	AJ McGinnis	6 ft 4 in (1.93 m)	177 lb (80 kg)	So	Cincinnati	Huntsville, AL
F	1	Rylan Houck	6 ft 5 in (1.96 m)	192 lb (87 kg)	Fr	Oxford High School	Oxford, AL
G	2	Will Pruitt	6 ft 3 in (1.91 m)	195 lb (88 kg)	So	Mount Juliet High School	Mount Juliet, TN
G	3	Trae Benham	6 ft 3 in (1.91 m)	205 lb (93 kg)	So	Concord Academy	Concord, NC
G	4	Derrin Boyd	6 ft 3 in (1.91 m)	210 lb (95 kg)	So	Georgetown College	Princeton, KY
G	11	Quincy Clark	6 ft 2 in (1.88 m)	180 lb (82 kg)	So	Westerville Central High School	Westerville, OH
G	12	Paxton Davidson	6 ft 3 in (1.91 m)	197 lb (89 kg)	Fr	Green Hill High School	Mount Juliet, TN
F	13	Hank Hutcheson	6 ft 6 in (1.98 m)	191 lb (87 kg)	Jr	Trevecca Nazarene	Brentwood, TN
G	14	Tommy Murr	6 ft 1 in (1.85 m)	165 lb (75 kg)	So	Lindsey Lane Christian School	Athens, AL
G	15	Jack Ingold	6 ft 3 in (1.91 m)	190 lb (86 kg)	Jr	George Washington High School	Charleston, WV
F	21	TJ Johnson	6 ft 6 in (1.98 m)	203 lb (92 kg)	Fr	Belton High School	Belton, TX
C	23	Ahsan Asadullah	6 ft 10 in (2.08 m)	275 lb (125 kg)	GS	North Clayton High School	Atlanta, GA
G	24	Jason Montgomery	6 ft 5 in (1.96 m)	200 lb (91 kg)	So	Drury	St. Louis, MO
F	32	Matt Schner	6 ft 5 in (1.96 m)	200 lb (91 kg)	GS	Emory	Boca Raton, FL
C	35	Grant Asman	6 ft 10 in (2.08 m)	210 lb (95 kg)	Fr	Kimberly High School	Kimberly, WI
F	41	Jacob Ognacevic	6 ft 7 in (2.01 m)	220 lb (100 kg)	So	Valparaiso	Sheboygan, WI

Head coach

- Lennie Acuff (Shorter)

Assistant coach(es)

- Kevin Carroll (Berry)
- Roger Idstrom (Mars Hill)
- Tyler Murray (Hampden–Sydney)

Legend

- (C) Team captain
- (S) Suspended
- (I) Ineligible
- (W) Walk-on
- Injured
- Current redshirt

Roster
Last update: January 17, 2023

== Schedule and results ==
Date time, TV	Rank^{#}	Opponent^{#}	Result	Record	Site (attendance) city, state
Non-conference regular season
November 9, 2022*; 7:00 p.m., ESPN+		at South Dakota	L 77–85	0–1	Sanford Coyote Sports Center (1,984); Vermillion, SD
November 12, 2022*; 4:30 p.m., ESPN+		Campbellsville–Harrodsburg	W 107–54	1–1	Allen Arena (4,789); Nashville, TN
November 14, 2022*; 7:00 p.m., ESPN+		Belmont; Battle of the Boulevard	W 77–75	2–1	Allen Arena (3,772); Nashville, TN
November 18, 2022*; 6:00 p.m., ACCNX		at Notre Dame	L 65–66	2–2	Joyce Center (6,552); South Bend, IN
November 21, 2022*; 7:00 p.m., ESPN+		Covenant	W 86–61	3–2	Allen Arena (2,211); Nashville, TN
November 23, 2022*; 3:00 p.m., ESPN+		at Chattanooga	W 72–66	4–2	McKenzie Arena (2,717); Chattanooga, TN
November 30, 2022*; 11:00 a.m., ESPN+		Navy	W 82–77	5–2	Allen Arena (1,675); Nashville, TN
December 5, 2022*; 7:00 p.m., ESPN+		Trevecca Nazarene	W 87–49	6–2	Allen Arena (1,170); Nashville, TN
December 9, 2022*; 7:00 p.m., YouTube		at Alabama A&M	L 59–63	6–3	Elmore Gymnasium (952); Normal, AL
December 11, 2022*; 2:30 p.m., ESPN+		at Tennessee State	L 85–90	6–4	Gentry Complex (708); Nashville, TN
December 14, 2022*; 7:00 p.m., ESPN+		Tennessee Tech	W 64–63	7–4	Allen Arena (661); Nashville, TN
December 17, 2022*; 3:00 p.m., BTN+		at Michigan	L 75–83	7–5	Crisler Center (12,470); Ann Arbor, MI
December 20, 2022*; 5:00 p.m., ACCNX		at Louisville	W 75–67	8–5	KFC Yum! Center (11,861); Louisville, KY
ASUN Conference regular season
December 30, 2022; 2:00 p.m., ESPN+		Stetson	L 80–86 ^{OT}	8–6 (0–1)	Allen Arena (1,204); Nashville, TN
January 2, 2023; 6:00 p.m., ESPN+		at Liberty	L 48–77	8–7 (0–2)	Liberty Arena (2,437); Lynchburg, VA
January 5, 2023; 7:00 p.m., ESPN+		North Alabama	W 86–62	9–7 (1–2)	Allen Arena (1,190); Nashville, TN
January 7, 2023; 5:00 p.m., ESPN+		at Jacksonville	L 44–51	9–8 (1–3)	Swisher Gymnasium (1,333); Jacksonville, FL
January 12, 2023; 8:00 p.m., ESPN+		at Austin Peay	W 87–65	10–8 (2–3)	Dunn Center (958); Clarksville, TN
January 14, 2023; 4:00 p.m., ESPN+		Austin Peay	W 86–72	11–8 (3–3)	Allen Arena; Nashville, TN
January 19, 2023; 7:00 p.m., ESPN+		Eastern Kentucky	W 75–62	12–8 (4–3)	Allen Arena (1,681); Nashville, TN
January 21, 2023; 4:00 p.m., ESPN+		Bellarmine	W 69–49	13–8 (5–3)	Allen Arena (1,939); Nashville, TN
January 26, 2023; 8:00 p.m., ESPN+		at Jacksonville State	L 67–72	13–9 (5–4)	Pete Mathews Coliseum (2,744); Jacksonville, AL
January 28, 2023; 4:00 p.m., ESPN+		at Kennesaw State	L 72–85	13–10 (5–5)	KSU Convocation Center (1,879); Kennesaw, GA
February 2, 2023; 7:00 p.m., ESPN+		Queens	W 66–60	14–10 (6–5)	Allen Arena (1,418); Nashville, TN
February 4, 2023; 4:00 p.m., ESPN+		Liberty	W 69–64	15–10 (7–5)	Allen Arena (3,567); Nashville, TN
February 9, 2022; 7:30 p.m., ESPN+		at Central Arkansas	W 93–81	16–10 (8–5)	Farris Center (1,025); Conway, AR
February 11, 2023; 7:15 p.m., ESPN+		at North Alabama	L 70–80	16–11 (8–6)	Flowers Hall (2,700); Florence, AL
February 16, 2023; 7:00 p.m., ESPN+		at North Florida	L 111–114 ^{2OT}	16–12 (8–7)	Allen Arena (1,782); Nashville, TN
February 18, 2023; 4:00 p.m., ESPN+		Jacksonville	W 62–59	17–12 (9–7)	Allen Arena (1,726); Nashville, TN
February 22, 2023; 6:00 p.m., ESPN+		at Florida Gulf Coast	W 73–64	18–12 (10–7)	Alico Arena (2,034); Fort Myers, FL
February 24, 2023; 6:00 p.m., ESPN+		at Stetson	W 98–91 ^{OT}	19–12 (11–7)	Edmunds Center (678); DeLand, FL
ASUN tournament
February 28, 2023; 7:00 p.m., ESPN+	(5)	at (4) Stetson; Quarterfinals	W 83–70	20–12	Edmunds Center (671); DeLand, FL
March 2, 2023; 6:00 p.m., ESPN+	(5)	at (1) Kennesaw State; Semifinals	L 71–80	20–13	KSU Convocation Center (3,137); Kennesaw, GA
*Non-conference game. ^{#}Rankings from AP poll. (#) Tournament seedings in parentheses. All times are in Central.
