= 2022–23 Eastern Kentucky Colonels men's basketball team =

American college basketball season

2022–23 Eastern Kentucky Colonels men's basketball

CBI, Runner–up
- Conference: ASUN Conference
- Record: 23–14 (12–6 ASUN)
- Head coach: A. W. Hamilton (5th season)
- Assistant coaches: Mike Allen; Patrick Blake; Steve Lepore
- Home arena: Baptist Health Arena

2022–23 ASUN men's basketball standings
	Conf.				Overall
Team	W		L	PCT	W		L	PCT
Kennesaw State †	15	–	3	.833	26	–	9	.743
Liberty	15	–	3	.833	27	–	9	.750
Eastern Kentucky	12	–	6	.667	23	–	14	.622
Stetson	12	–	6	.667	17	–	14	.548
Lipscomb	11	–	7	.611	20	–	13	.606
North Alabama	10	–	8	.556	18	–	15	.545
North Florida	9	–	9	.500	14	–	17	.452
Bellarmine*	9	–	9	.500	15	–	18	.455
Queens*	7	–	11	.389	18	–	15	.545
Florida Gulf Coast	7	–	11	.389	17	–	15	.531
Jacksonville	6	–	12	.333	13	–	16	.448
Jacksonville State	6	–	12	.333	13	–	18	.419
Central Arkansas	4	–	14	.222	9	–	22	.290
Austin Peay	3	–	15	.167	9	–	22	.290
† 2023 ASUN tournament winner * Ineligible for the 2023 NCAA tournament due to transition from Division II

The 2022–23 Eastern Kentucky Colonels men's basketball team represented Eastern Kentucky University in the 2022–23 NCAA Division I men's basketball season. The Colonels, led by fifth-year head coach A. W. Hamilton, played their home games at Baptist Health Arena in Richmond, Kentucky as members of the ASUN Conference.

== Previous season ==
The Colonels finished the 2021–22 season 13–18, 5–11 in ASUN play, to finish in fifth place in the West Division. In the ASUN tournament, they were defeated by Kennesaw State in the first round.

== Roster ==
2022–23 Eastern Kentucky Colonels men's basketball team
Players
Coaches

Pos.	#	Name	Height	Weight	Year	Hometown
G	0	Turner Buttry	5 ft 11 in (1.8 m)	165 lb (75 kg)	Fr	Bowling Green, Kentucky
G	1	Tayshawn Comer	6 ft 1 in (1.85 m)	190 lb (86 kg)	Fr	Indianapolis, Indiana
G	2	Leland Walker	6 ft 1 in (1.85 m)	185 lb (84 kg)	Fr	Indianapolis, Indiana
G	3	DaShawn Jackson	6 ft 3 in (1.91 m)	196 lb (89 kg)	So	Lexington, Kentucky
G	5	Cooper Robb	6 ft 1 in (1.85 m)	184 lb (83 kg)	Sr	Georgetown, Kentucky
G/F	10	Devontae Blanton	6 ft 6 in (1.98 m)	214 lb (97 kg)	Jr	Macedonia, Ohio
G	11	Jackson Holt	6 ft 4 in (1.93 m)	185 lb (84 kg)	Fr	Cincinnati, Ohio
F	12	Michael Wardy	6 ft 8 in (2.03 m)	203 lb (92 kg)	Sr	Lincoln, Nebraska
F	14	John Ukomadu	6 ft 7 in (2.01 m)	195 lb (88 kg)	Jr	Southfield, Michigan
F	15	Dardan Kapiti	6 ft 10 in (2.08 m)	213 lb (97 kg)	Jr	Prishtina, Kosovo
G	20	Bryson Perry	5 ft 9 in (1.75 m)	158 lb (72 kg)	So	Richmond, Kentucky
C	21	David Onanina	6 ft 8 in (2.03 m)	230 lb (104 kg)	Fr	Yaoundé, Cameroon
F	24	Michael Moreno	6 ft 7 in (2.01 m)	225 lb (102 kg)	Jr	Georgetown, Kentucky
F	50	Isaiah Cozart	6 ft 8 in (2.03 m)	240 lb (109 kg)	Sr	Richmond, Kentucky
G	55	Taelon Martin	6 ft 5 in (1.96 m)	180 lb (82 kg)	Jr	Springfield, Massachusetts

Head coach

- A. W. Hamilton (Marshall)

Assistant coach(es)

- Mike Allen (Ohio)
- Patrick Blake (Louisville)
- Steve Lepore (Wake Forest)

Legend

- (C) Team captain
- (S) Suspended
- (I) Ineligible
- (W) Walk-on
- Injured
- Current redshirt

Roster
Last update: December 11, 2022

== Schedule and results ==
Date time, TV	Rank^{#}	Opponent^{#}	Result	Record	Site (attendance) city, state
Non-conference regular season
November 7, 2022*; 7:30 pm, ESPN+		Miami Middletown	W 137–52	1–0	Baptist Health Arena (3,058); Richmond, KY
November 10, 2022*; 7:00 pm, ESPN+		Western Kentucky	L 60–66	1–1	Baptist Health Arena (6,303); Richmond, KY
November 13, 2022*; 12:00 pm, ESPN+		at Cincinnati	L 69–87	1–2	Fifth Third Arena (9,103); Cincinnati, OH
November 18, 2022*; 6:00 pm, ESPN+		at Georgia State; Capitol Classic	W 62–61	2–2	GSU Convocation Center (1,259); Atlanta, GA
November 19, 2022*; 5:30 pm		vs. UNC Asheville; Capitol Classic	W 77–75	3–2	GSU Convocation Center (593); Atlanta, GA
November 20, 2022*; 1:00 pm		vs. Texas A&M–Commerce; Capitol Classic	L 61–75	3–3	GSU Convocation Center (588); Atlanta, GA
November 23, 2022*; 4:30 pm, ESPN+		Brescia	W 122–84	4–3	Baptist Health Arena (2,106); Richmond, KY
December 2, 2022*; 7:00 pm, ESPN+		at James Madison	L 80–97	4–4	Atlantic Union Bank Center (4,303); Harrisonburg, VA
December 7, 2022*; 7:00 pm, SECN		at No. 7 Tennessee	L 49–84	4–5	Thompson–Boling Arena (15,746); Knoxville, TN
December 10, 2022*; 7:00 pm, ESPN+		Boyce	W 140–79	5–5	Baptist Health Arena (2,881); Richmond, KY
December 14, 2022*; 7:00 pm, ESPN+		at Northern Kentucky	L 61-64	5–6	Truist Arena (2,854); Highland Heights, KY
December 17, 2022*; 2:00 pm, ESPN+		Radford	W 67-65	6–6	Baptist Health Arena (2,991); Richmond, KY
December 22, 2022*; 2:00 pm, ESPN+		UNC Greensboro	W 68-64	7–6	Baptist Health Arena (2,683); Richmond, KY
ASUN regular season
December 31, 2022; 4:00 pm, ESPN+		Queens	W 88–83	8–6 (1–0)	Baptist Health Arena (2,577); Richmond, KY
January 2, 2023; 6:30 pm, ESPN+		at Kennesaw State	L 75–79	8–7 (1–1)	KSU Convocation Center (810); Kennesaw, GA
January 5, 2023; 8:00 pm, ESPN+		at Central Arkansas	W 77–75	9–7 (2–1)	Farris Center (545); Conway, AR
January 8, 2023; 1:00 pm, ESPN+		Liberty	W 62–59	10–7 (3–1)	Baptist Health Arena (3,216); Richmond, KY
January 12, 2023; 7:00 pm, ESPN+		Florida Gulf Coast	W 97–76	11–7 (4–1)	Baptist Health Arena (3,389); Richmond, KY
January 14, 2023; 3:00 pm, ESPN+		Stetson	W 85–70	12–7 (5–1)	Baptist Health Arena (3,592); Richmond, KY
January 19, 2023; 8:00 pm, ESPN+		at Lipscomb	L 62–75	12–8 (5–2)	Allen Arena (1,681); Nashville, TN
January 21, 2023; 4:00 pm, ESPN+		at Austin Peay	W 74–59	13–8 (6–2)	Dunn Center (1,636); Clarksville, TN
January 26, 2023; 6:30 pm, ESPN+		at Bellarmine	L 71–72	13–9 (6–3)	Freedom Hall (3,842); Louisville, KY
January 28, 2023; 7:00 pm, ESPN+		Bellarmine	W 73–63	14–9 (7–3)	Baptist Health Arena (4,025); Richmond, KY
February 2, 2023; 7:30 pm, ESPN+		Jacksonville State	W 69–67	15–9 (8–3)	Baptist Health Arena (3,486); Richmond, KY
February 4, 2023; 7:00 pm, ESPN+		Kennesaw State	W 77–74	16–9 (9–3)	Baptist Health Arena (3,761); Richmond, KY
February 9, 2023; 7:00 pm, ESPN+		at Queens	W 84–80	17–9 (10–3)	Curry Arena (423); Charlotte, NC
February 11, 2023; 7:00 pm, ESPN+		at Liberty	L 73–83	17–10 (10–4)	Liberty Arena (3,961); Lynchburg, VA
February 16, 2023; 7:30 pm, ESPN+		Central Arkansas	W 74–58	18–10 (11–4)	Baptist Health Arena (3,412); Richmond, KY
February 18, 2023; 7:00 pm, ESPN+		North Alabama	L 93–98 ^{OT}	18–11 (11–5)	Baptist Health Arena (4,467); Richmond, KY
February 22, 2023; 7:00 pm, ESPN+		at North Florida	L 64–77	18–12 (11–6)	UNF Arena (1,619); Jacksonville, FL
February 24, 2023; 7:00 pm, ESPN+		at Jacksonville	W 56–52	19–12 (12–6)	Swisher Gymnasium (804); Jacksonville, FL
ASUN tournament
February 28, 2023; 7:00 pm, ESPN+	(3)	(6) North Alabama; Quarterfinals	W 73–48	20–12	Baptist Health Arena (4,574); Richmond, KY
March 2, 2023; 7:00 pm, ESPN+	(3)	at (2) Liberty; Semifinals	L 73–79	20–13	Liberty Arena (4,043); Lynchburg, VA
College Basketball Invitational
March 19, 2023; 11:00 a.m., FloHoops	(8)	vs. (9) Cleveland State; First round	W 91–75 ^{OT}	21–13	Ocean Center; Daytona Beach, FL
March 20, 2023; 12:00 p.m., FloHoops	(8)	vs. (1) Indiana State; Quarterfinals	W 89–88 ^{OT}	22–13	Ocean Center; Daytona Beach, FL
March 21, 2023; 7:00 p.m., ESPN2	(8)	vs. (4) Southern Utah; Semifinals	W 108–106 ^{2OT}	23–13	Ocean Center; Daytona Beach, FL
March 22, 2023; 5:00 p.m., ESPN2	(8)	vs. (3) Charlotte; Championship	L 68–71	23–14	Ocean Center (771); Daytona Beach, FL
*Non-conference game. ^{#}Rankings from AP poll. (#) Tournament seedings in parentheses. All times are in Eastern.
