= 2023 ASUN men's basketball tournament =

American college basketball postseason tournament

- Classification: Division I
- Season: 2022–23
- Teams: 10
- Site: Campus sites
- Champions: Kennesaw State (1st title)
- Winning coach: Amir Abdur-Rahim (1st title)
- MVP: Terrell Burden (Kennesaw State)
- Attendance: 22,217
- Television: ESPN+, ESPN2

The 2023 ASUN men's basketball tournament was the conference postseason tournament for the ASUN Conference. The tournament was the 44th year the league has conducted a postseason tournament. The tournament was held February 27–March 5 at campus sites of the higher seeds. The winner, Kennesaw State, received the conference's automatic bid to the 2023 NCAA Tournament for the first time in school history.

2022–23 ASUN men's basketball standings
	Conf.				Overall
Team	W		L	PCT	W		L	PCT
Kennesaw State †	15	–	3	.833	26	–	9	.743
Liberty	15	–	3	.833	27	–	9	.750
Eastern Kentucky	12	–	6	.667	23	–	14	.622
Stetson	12	–	6	.667	17	–	14	.548
Lipscomb	11	–	7	.611	20	–	13	.606
North Alabama	10	–	8	.556	18	–	15	.545
North Florida	9	–	9	.500	14	–	17	.452
Bellarmine*	9	–	9	.500	15	–	18	.455
Queens*	7	–	11	.389	18	–	15	.545
Florida Gulf Coast	7	–	11	.389	17	–	15	.531
Jacksonville	6	–	12	.333	13	–	16	.448
Jacksonville State	6	–	12	.333	13	–	18	.419
Central Arkansas	4	–	14	.222	9	–	22	.290
Austin Peay	3	–	15	.167	9	–	22	.290
† 2023 ASUN tournament winner * Ineligible for the 2023 NCAA tournament due to transition from Division II

== Seeds ==
Ten teams contested the bracket. The tournament had a new format in 2023, as all rounds were reseeded instead of a traditional set bracket. To that end, the 9 and 10 seeds played each other in round 1, and the 7 and 8 seed did as well, rather than the traditional 7/10 and 8/9 matchup.

The two tiebreakers used by the ASUN were 1) head-to-head record of teams with identical records and 2) NCAA NET rankings available on day following the conclusion of ASUN regular-season play.

If a team that is not eligible for the NCAA tournament wins the ASUN tournament, the conference's automatic bid goes to the regular-season champion. In the case of a tie for first place, the automatic bid goes to the tied team that advances furthest in the conference tournament. If all tied teams are eliminated in the same round of the tournament, the automatic bid goes to the highest seeded team in accordance with the conference's tiebreaking procedures.

Seed	School	Conference	Head-to-Head	NET ranking (February 25, 2023)
1	Kennesaw State	15–3	1–0 vs. Liberty	121
2	Liberty	15–3	0–1 vs. KSU	42
3	Eastern Kentucky	12–6	1–0 vs. Stetson	181
4	Stetson	12–6	0–1 vs. EKU	152
5	Lipscomb	11–7		161
6	North Alabama	10–8		229
7	North Florida	9–9	1–0 vs. Bell.	226
8	Bellarmine	9–9	0–1 vs. UNF	266
9	Queens	7–11	1–0 vs. FGCU	210
10	Florida Gulf Coast	7–11	0–1 vs. Queens	174
DNQ	Jacksonville	6–12	2–0 vs. Jvl. St.	237
DNQ	Jacksonville State	6–12	0–2 vs. Jax.	239
DNQ	Central Arkansas	4–14		335
DNQ	Austin Peay	3–15		328

== Schedule ==
Game	Time	Matchup	Score	Television
First round – Monday, February 27 – KSU Convocation Center & Liberty Arena
1	6:00 pm	No. 10 Florida Gulf Coast vs. No. 9 Queens	55–61	ESPN+
2	6:00 pm	No. 8 Bellarmine vs. No. 7 North Florida	76–74	ESPN+
Quarterfinals – Tuesday, February 28 – Campus Sites
3	6:00 pm	No. 9 Queens at No. 1 Kennesaw State	66–67	ESPN+
4	6:00 pm	No. 5 Lipscomb at No. 4 Stetson	83–70	ESPN+
5	6:00 pm	No. 8 Bellarmine at No. 2 Liberty	56–76	ESPN+
6	6:00 pm	No. 6 North Alabama at No. 3 Eastern Kentucky	48–73	ESPN+
Semifinals – Thursday, March 2 – Campus Sites
7	6:00 pm	No. 5 Lipscomb at No. 1 Kennesaw State	71–80	ESPN+
8	6:00 pm	No. 3 Eastern Kentucky at No. 2 Liberty	73–79	ESPN+
Championship – Sunday, March 5 – Campus Site
9	2:00 pm	No. 2 Liberty at No. 1 Kennesaw State	66–67	ESPN2
Game times in CT. Rankings denote tournament seed

== Bracket ==
First round Monday, February 27
9	Queens	61
10	Florida Gulf Coast	55
7	North Florida	74
8	Bellarmine	76

Quarterfinals; Tuesday, February 28
1	Kennesaw State	67
9	Queens	66
4	Stetson	70
5	Lipscomb	83
2	Liberty	76
8	Bellarmine	56
3	Eastern Kentucky	73
6	North Alabama	48

Semifinals; Thursday, March 2
1	Kennesaw State	80
5	Lipscomb	71
2	Liberty	79
3	Eastern Kentucky	73

Championship; Sunday, March 5
1	Kennesaw State	67
2	Liberty	66

== Game summaries ==
=== First round ===
ESPN+

February 27
6:00 p.m.

No. 10 Florida Gulf Coast 55, No. 9 Queens 61
Scoring by half: 33–35, 22–26
Pts: C. Johnston (24); Rebs: Z. Anderson (6); Asts: C. Catto (6)	Pts: Tied (12); Rebs: J. Turner (18); Asts: Tied (3)

KSU Convocation Center
Kennesaw, GA
Attendance: 123

ESPN+

February 27
6:00 p.m.

No. 8 Bellarmine 76, No. 7 North Florida 74
Scoring by half: 37–38, 39–36
Pts: B. Johnson (26); Rebs: L. Hatton (8); Asts: P. Suder (5)	Pts: J. Hicklen (25); Rebs: C. Lanier (5); Asts: J. Placer (7)

Liberty Arena
Lynchburg, VA
Attendance: 135

=== Quarterfinals ===
ESPN+

February 28
6:00 p.m.

No. 9 Queens 66, No. 1 Kennesaw State 67
Scoring by half: 29–26, 37–41
Pts: Tied (13); Rebs: J. Turner (9); Asts: Tied (3)	Pts: D. Robinson (22); Rebs: C. Youngblood (7); Asts: S. Rodgers (5)

KSU Convocation Center
Kennesaw, GA
Attendance: 2,322

ESPN+

February 28
6:00 p.m.

No. 5 Lipscomb 83, No. 4 Stetson 70
Scoring by half: 35–33, 48–37
Pts: J. Ognacevic (22); Rebs: Tied (7); Asts: Q. Clark (9)	Pts: J. Blackmon (33); Rebs: J. Smith (10); Asts: S. Swenson (4)

Edmunds Center
DeLand, FL
Attendance: 671

ESPN+

February 28
6:00 p.m.

No. 8 Bellarmine 56, No. 2 Liberty 76
Scoring by half: 31–48, 25–28
Pts: A. Pfriem (13); Rebs: J. Betz (6); Asts: P. Suder (3)	Pts: D. McGhee (29); Rebs: Z. Cleveland (8); Asts: D. McGhee (6)

Liberty Arena
Lynchburg, VA
Attendance: 3,407

ESPN+

February 28
6:00 p.m.

No. 6 North Alabama 48, No. 3 Eastern Kentucky 73
Scoring by half: 19–37, 29–36
Pts: D. Ortiz (22); Rebs: D. Ortiz (5); Asts: J. Lane (2)	Pts: D. Blanton (15); Rebs: J. Ukomadu (9); Asts: L. Walker (7)

Baptist Health Arena
Richmond, KY
Attendance: 4,574

=== Semifinals ===
ESPN+

March 2
6:00 p.m.

No. 5 Lipscomb 71, No. 1 Kennesaw State 80
Scoring by half: 28–38, 43–42
Pts: J. Ognacevic (26); Rebs: W. Pruitt (9); Asts: Q. Clark (4)	Pts: T. Burden (20); Rebs: B. Stroud (9); Asts: T Burden (7)

KSU Convocation Center
Kennesaw, GA
Attendance: 3,137

ESPN+

March 2
6:00 p.m.

No. 3 Eastern Kentucky 73, No. 2 Liberty 79
Scoring by half: 36–34, 37–45
Pts: D. Blanton (23); Rebs: D. Blanton (9); Asts: T. Comer (4)	Pts: D. McGhee (29); Rebs: J. Venzant (7); Asts: D. McGhee (4)

Liberty Arena
Lynchburg, VA
Attendance: 4,043

=== Final ===
ESPN2

March 5
2:00 p.m.

No. 2 Liberty 66, No. 1 Kennesaw State 67
Scoring by half: 29–27, 37–40
Pts: K. Rode (23); Rebs: Z. Cleveland (7); Asts: C. Porter (4)	Pts: T. Burden (19); Rebs: D. Robinson (11); Asts: T. Burden (3)

KSU Convocation Center
Kennesaw, GA
Attendance: 3,805
