= Campbell High School (Georgia) =

Public high school in Smyrna, Georgia, U.S.

Location
- 5265 Ward Street; Smyrna, Georgia 30080; United States; 33°53′21″N 84°31′35″W

Information
- Type: Public high school and International Baccalaureate magnet school
- Motto: Learning Today for Tomorrow's World.
- Established: 1952; 74 years ago
- School district: Cobb County School District
- Principal: Paul Gillihan
- Teaching staff: 176.40 (FTE)
- Grades: 9–12
- Enrollment: 3,085 (2024–2025)
- Student to teacher ratio: 17.49
- Campus type: Suburban
- Colors: Royal blue; Silver
- Mascot: Spartans
- Newspaper: The Spartan Chronicles
- Website: www.cobbk12.org/campbellhs

Campbell High School is a public high school and International Baccalaureate magnet school located in Smyrna, Georgia (U.S.), northwest of Atlanta. It is part of the Cobb County School District. The school implemented the International Baccalaureate diploma program in 1997, serving as a magnet school for the Cobb County School District.

== History ==
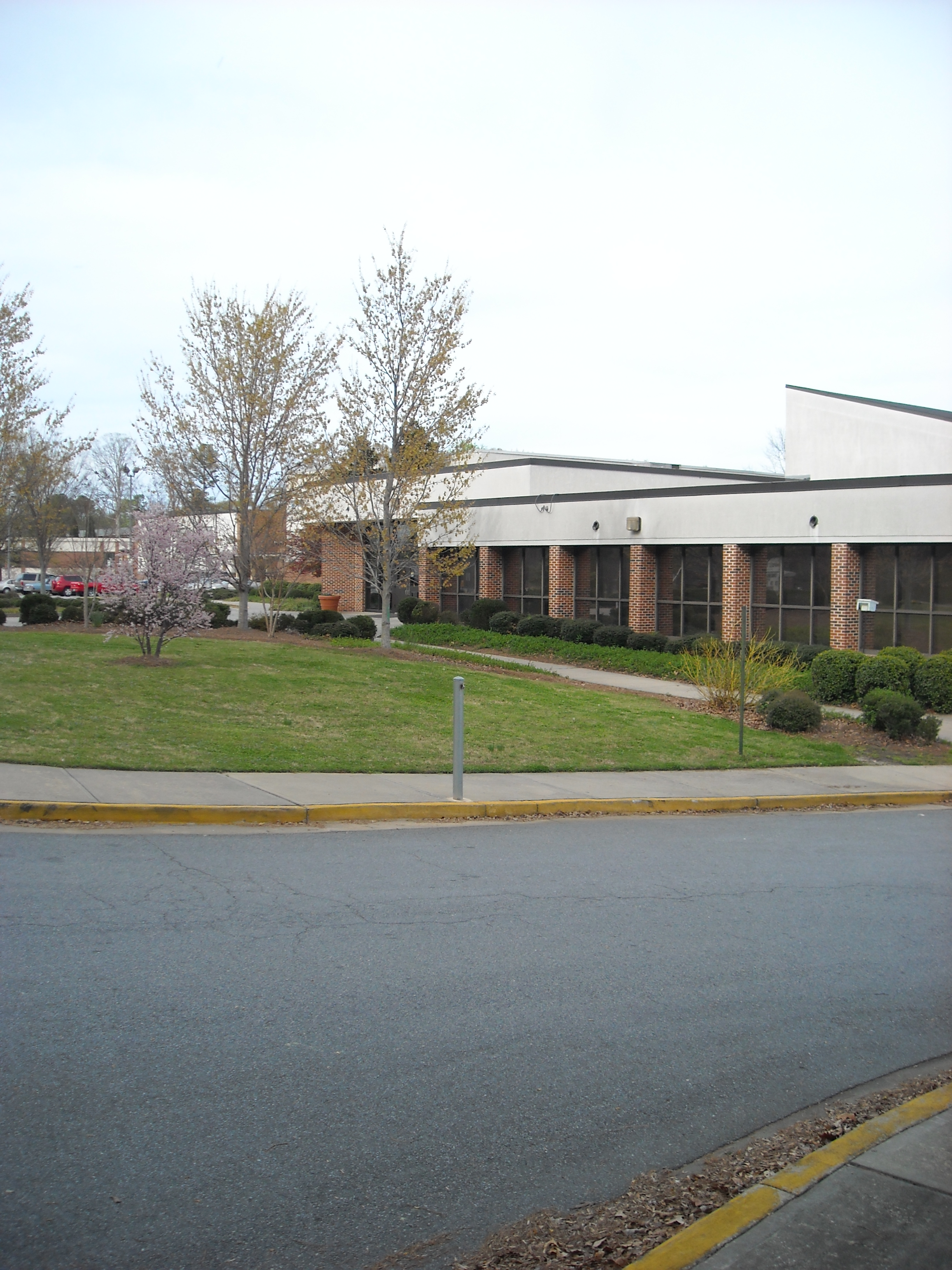
The current main entrance to Campbell High, the Nash Entrance and 2000 building visible on horizon

The school was named after Orme Campbell, the mother of the man who donated the land on which the original school was built, with the stipulation that the name of the school could never be changed. Orme Campbell High School opened in 1952 with the merger of Smyrna High School and Fitzhugh Lee High School. It opened with 425 students in grades 8-11.

In 1989, Orme Campbell High School and F.T. Wills High School merged to form Smyrna High School. Before the merger, Campbell students were known as the Green and White "Panthers" and Wills students were known as the Red and Black "Tigers". The students united in selecting new colors, royal blue and silver, and a new mascot, the "Spartans".

In 1990, the courts overruled the name change of the school because of stipulations in the original deed restrictions on the property that the school sited there must be named for the Campbell family, and the name "Campbell High School" was reinstated. Since the ruling pertained only to the school name, it was decided the new colors and the new mascot would be left unchanged. In 1997, the school was relocated to the site of the original Wills High School because of rapid growth, but kept the Campbell name in order to maintain a consistent identity.

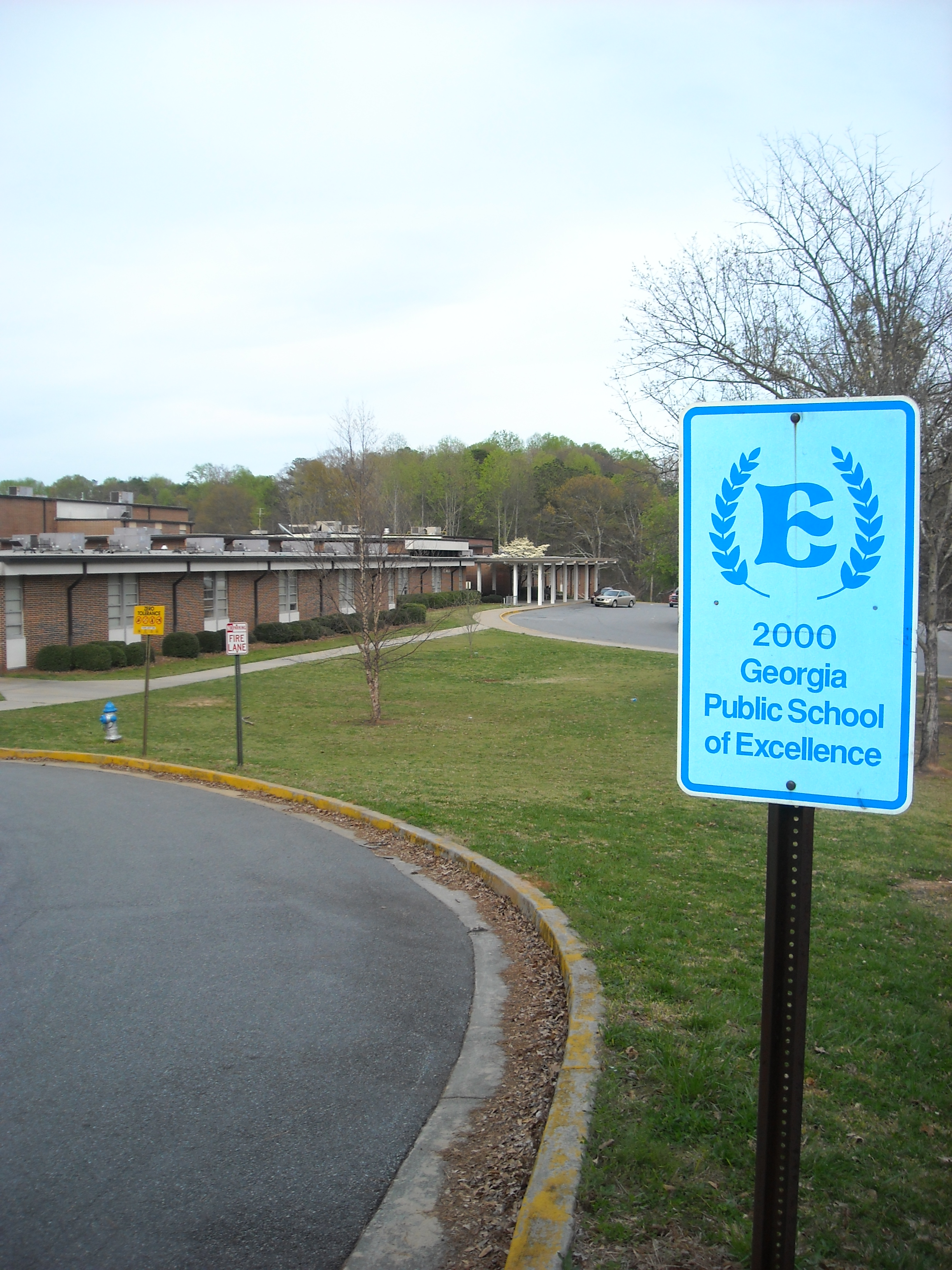
South Main Entrance of Campbell, formerly the Front Entrance of Wills High School

== Demographics ==
The breakdown of the 2,869 students enrolled for the 2021–22 school year:

- Male – 46.8%
- Female – 53.2%
- Native American/Alaskan – 0.3%
- Asian – 4.9%
- Black – 40.4%
- Hispanic – 31.0%
- "Native Hawaiian/Pacific Islander" – 0.035%
- White – 19.6%
- Multiracial – 2.7%

== International Baccalaureate program ==
In fall 1997, Campbell implemented the International Baccalaureate (IB) program as an academic magnet program, Cobb County's first.

Students throughout Cobb County apply to the IB program during the fall of their 8th grade year. If accepted, students are enrolled in a rigorous curriculum in 9th and 10th grade during which they complete the majority of the Georgia required courses for graduation. In 11th and 12th grades, the students are enrolled in the IB Diploma curriculum.

== Notable alumni ==
- McKinley Belcher III (Class of 2002), actor
- Terrell Burden (Class of 2019), basketball player
- Ben Chukwuma (Class of 2020), offensive tackle for the Tampa Bay Buccaneers
- C. Martin Croker, animation artist/director and voice actor
- Tay Glover-Wright (Class of 2010), American football player
- Chris Lewis-Harris (Class of 2007), defensive back for the Cincinnati Bengals
- Brian Oliver (Wills Class of 1986), basketball player
- Julia Roberts (Class of 1985), Academy Award-winning actress
- Billy Joe Royal, Country soul singer

== Facilities ==
Over 15 hallways and six buildings make up Campbell High School. The main building is composed of the original Nash Middle School and Wills High School buildings, connected by a media center, main office suites, the Livingston Auditorium, and the dining hall. The 1000 Building (science) is at the rear of the school, adjacent to the fieldhouse.

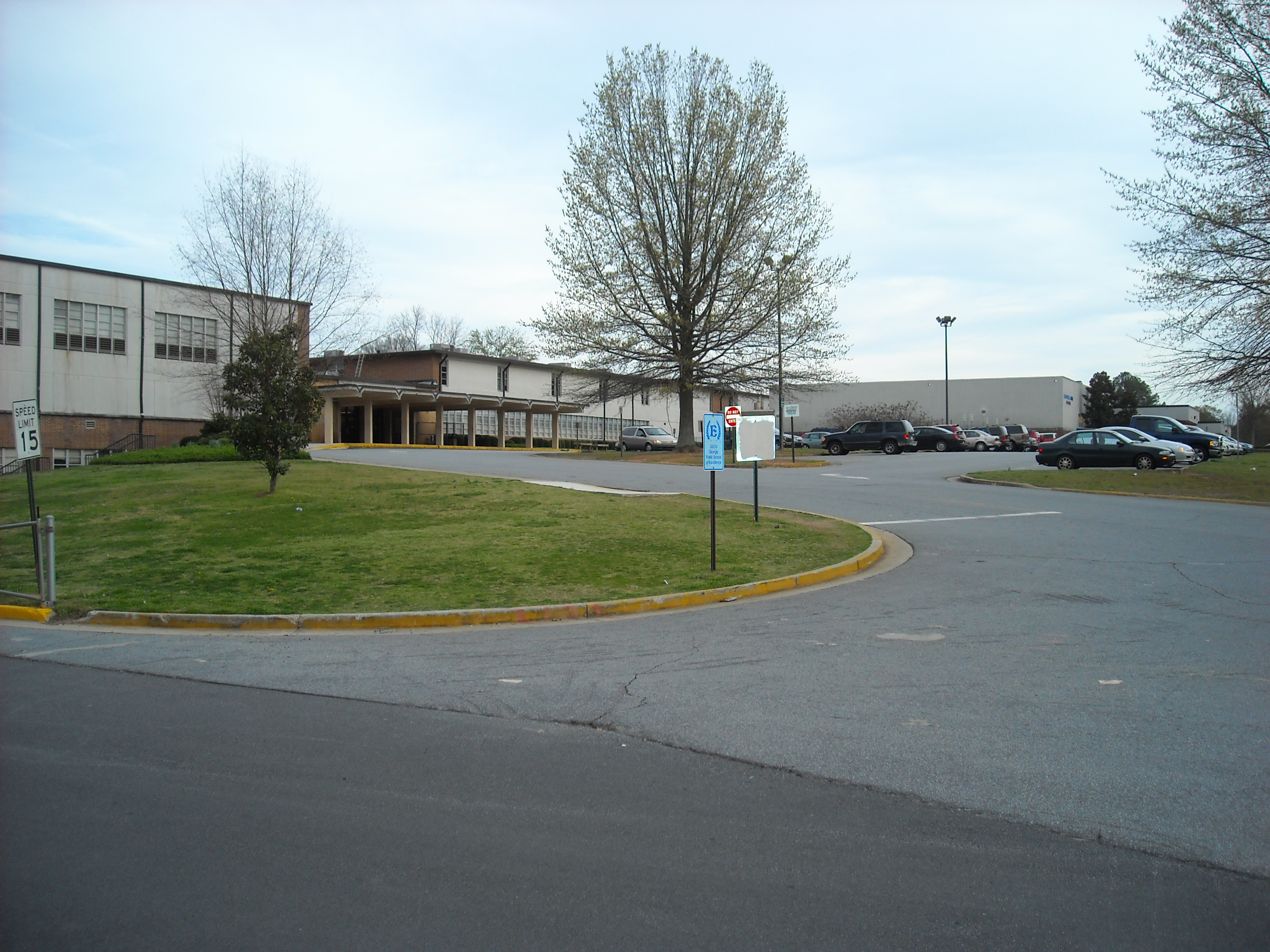
The northern half of the main building is the old Nash Middle building, as seen from Ward Street above

Along the northern end of campus is the 2000 Building (constructed January 2008), which replaced 12 portable classrooms and added many courses the school had previously not offered. Adjacent to that building are the new greenhouse and horticulture buildings.

In 2007, new fine arts classes were built, and others moved to make room for the growing programs. The state-of-the-art Band Hall has seven practice rooms, five instrument/uniform storage rooms, a connected office/music library, as well as the vast main room. The Band and Choral Halls were constructed using the same standards as Allatoona High, the newest prototype high school in the county. The old Band Room was renovated and expanded, making room for the Campbell Orchestra. In 2020 a new Performing Arts Center was built. It is home to the Theatre Department, which does five mainstage productions per year.

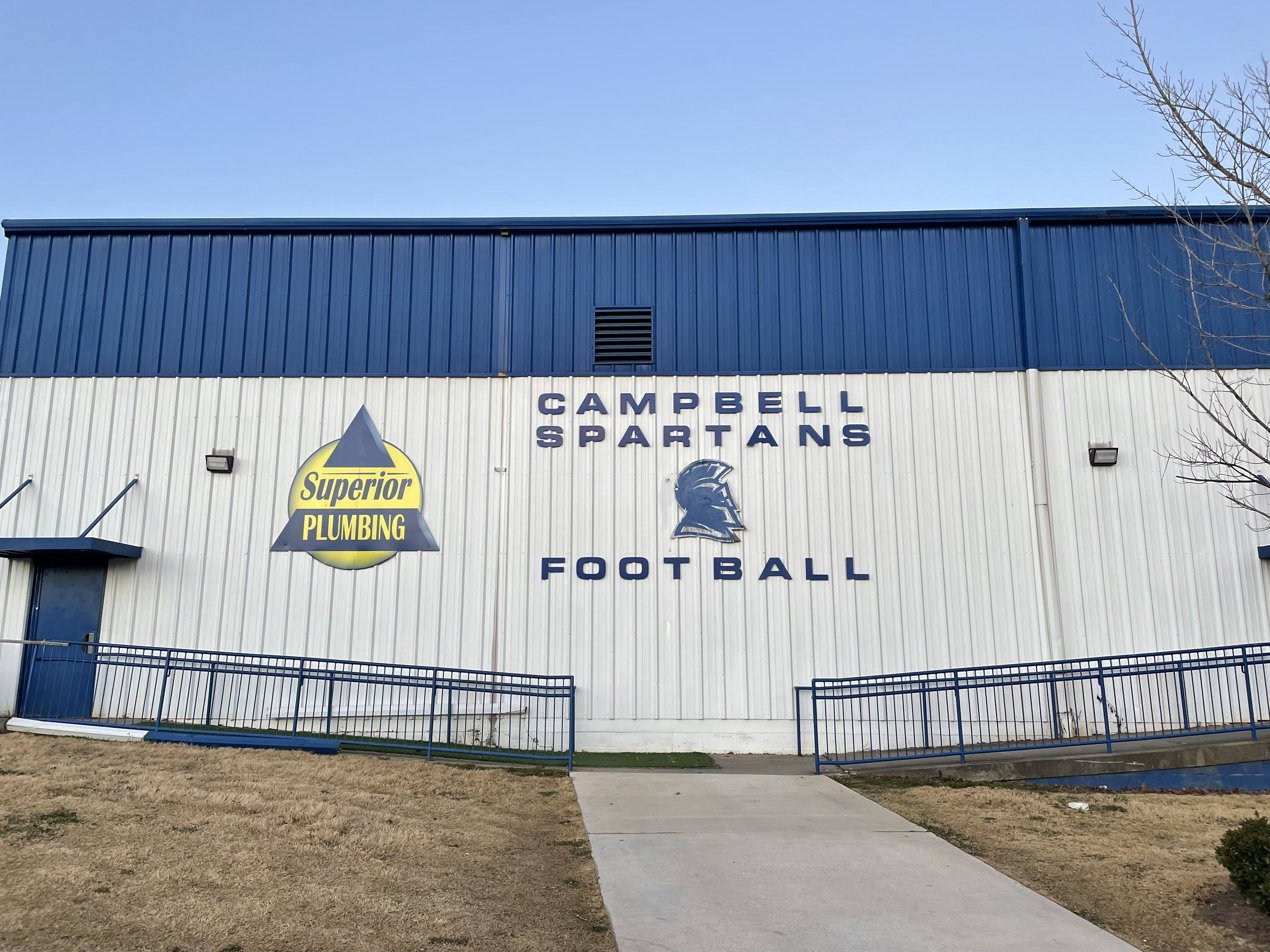
Football building

McDaniel Stadium (refurbished with new artificial turf and other amenities in fall 2010), is at the rear of the school. It runs parallel to the connected back parking lot and bus port, which functions as the practice field for the Spartan Marching Band in the fall. Across Ward Street from the main office are the tennis courts and practice fields, as well as athletic fields for both softball and baseball.
