= 2012–13 Lipscomb Bisons men's basketball team =

American college basketball season

2012–13 Lipscomb Bisons men's basketball
- Conference: Atlantic Sun Conference
- Record: 12–18 (7–11 A-Sun)
- Head coach: Scott Sanderson (14th season)
- Assistant coaches: Pete Froedden; Shaun Senters; Ryan Cahak
- Home arena: Allen Arena

2012–13 Atlantic Sun men's basketball standings
	Conf.				Overall
Team	W		L	PCT	W		L	PCT
Mercer	14	–	4	.778	24	–	12	.667
Florida Gulf Coast †	13	–	5	.722	26	–	11	.703
Stetson	11	–	7	.611	15	–	16	.484
USC Upstate	9	–	9	.500	16	–	17	.485
Jacksonville	9	–	9	.500	14	–	18	.438
Northern Kentucky*	9	–	9	.500	11	–	16	.407
North Florida	8	–	10	.444	13	–	19	.406
East Tennessee State	8	–	10	.444	10	–	22	.313
Lipscomb	7	–	11	.389	12	–	18	.400
Kennesaw State	2	–	16	.111	3	–	27	.100
† 2013 Atlantic Sun Tournament winner As of March 29, 2013; Rankings from AP Poll *ineligible for postseason play due to Div. I transition

The 2012–13 Lipscomb Bisons men's basketball team represented Lipscomb University during the 2012–13 NCAA Division I men's basketball season. The Bisons, led by 14th year head coach Scott Sanderson, played their home games at Allen Arena and were members of the Atlantic Sun Conference. They finished the season 12–18, 7–11 in A-Sun play to finish in ninth place. They lost in the quarterfinals of the Atlantic Sun Basketball tournament to Mercer.

== Roster ==
2012–13 Lipscomb Bisons men's basketball team
Players
Coaches

Pos.	#	Name	Height	Weight	Year	Previous school	Hometown
G	0	Khion Sankey	6 ft 5 in (1.96 m)	220 lb (100 kg)	Jr	Sheridan CC	Stockton, CA
F	1	Malcolm Smith	6 ft 5 in (1.96 m)	210 lb (95 kg)	So	Clarksville Academy	Clarksville, TN
G	3	Carter Sanderson	6 ft 1 in (1.85 m)	170 lb (77 kg)	So	Lipscomb HS	Nashville, TN
G	4	Deonte Alexander	6 ft 1 in (1.85 m)	175 lb (79 kg)	Sr	East Mississippi CC	Nashville, TN
G	5	J.J. Butler	6 ft 3 in (1.91 m)	195 lb (88 kg)	Fr	Patterson Mill HS	Abingdon, MD
G	10	Talbott Denny	6 ft 6 in (1.98 m)	200 lb (91 kg)	Fr	Salpointe Catholic HS	Tucson, AZ
G	14	John Ross Glover	6 ft 4 in (1.93 m)	200 lb (91 kg)	Fr	University School of Jackson	Jackson, TN
G	15	Dylan Green	6 ft 4 in (1.93 m)	200 lb (91 kg)	Fr	Kiski Prep	Anaheim Hills, CA
G	20	Chad Johnson	6 ft 0 in (1.83 m)	185 lb (84 kg)	So	Edmond Santa Fe HS	Edmond, CA
C	21	Charles Smith	6 ft 9 in (2.06 m)	210 lb (95 kg)	Fr	Southwind HS	Memphis, TN
G	22	J.C. Hampton	6 ft 1 in (1.85 m)	180 lb (82 kg)	Fr	East Hall HS	Gainesville, GA
C	32	Oscar Garcia	6 ft 8 in (2.03 m)	225 lb (102 kg)	Jr	Otero JC	El Paso, TX
F	35	Martin Smith	6 ft 4 in (1.93 m)	190 lb (86 kg)	So	Clarksville Academy	Clarksville, TN
C	41	Stephen Hurt	6 ft 10 in (2.08 m)	285 lb (129 kg)	Fr	Siegel HS	Murfreesboro, TN
F	42	Zack Ellis	6 ft 6 in (1.98 m)	200 lb (91 kg)	Jr	Brentwood Academy	Franklin, TN

Head coach

- Scott Sanderson (South Carolina)

Assistant coach(es)

- Ryan Cahak (Syracuse)
- Pete Froedden (Lipscomb)
- Shaun Senters (Lipscomb)

Legend

- (C) Team captain
- (S) Suspended
- (I) Ineligible
- (W) Walk-on
- Injured
- Current redshirt

Roster
Last update: January 16, 2022

== Schedule ==
Date time, TV	Opponent	Result	Record	Site (attendance) city, state	
Exhibition
11/01/2012*; 7:15 pm		Freed-Hardeman	W 99–84		Allen Arena; Nashville, TN
Non-conference regular season
11/09/2012*; 6:30 pm		Belmont	L 60–89	0–1	Allen Arena (4,685); Nashville, TN
11/12/2012*; 5:00 pm		Maryville	W 73–55	1–1	Allen Arena (1,124); Nashville, TN
11/14/2012*; 5:00 pm		at Gardner-Webb	W 66–62	2–1	Paul Porter Arena (1,450); Boiling Springs, NC
11/23/2012*; 4:00 pm		at Ole Miss	L 45–91	2–2	Tad Smith Coliseum (4,591); Oxford, MS
11/26/2012*; 6:30 pm, ESPN3		Murray State	L 79–88	2–3	Allen Arena (2,985); Nashville, TN
11/30/2012*; 6:30 pm		Tennessee Tech	W 80–64	3–3	Allen Arena (2,254); Nashville, TN
12/04/2012*; 6:00 pm, ESPN3		at Belmont	L 66–100	3–4	Curb Event Center (3,196); Nashville, TN
12/08/2012*; 6:30 pm		Tennessee–Martin	W 86–62	4–4	Allen Arena (2,129); Nashville, TN
12/15/2012*; 11:30 am, ESPN3		at Kentucky	L 50–88	4–5	Rupp Arena (21,323); Lexington, KY
12/18/2012*; 7:00 pm		at Austin Peay	W 87–84	5–5	Dunn Center (2,498); Clarksville, TN
12/20/2012*; 7:00 pm, FSSO/SPSO		at Memphis	L 56–62	5–6	FedEx Forum (15,454); Memphis, TN
Atlantic Sun regular season
12/31/2013; 3:30 pm		at North Florida	L 70–84	5–7 (0–1)	UNF Arena (976); Jacksonville, FL
01/02/2013; 6:15 pm		Jacksonville	L 71–85	5–8 (0–2)	Jacksonville Veterans Memorial Arena (671); Jacksonville, FL
01/05/2013; 6:30 pm		East Tennessee State	W 60–56	6–8 (1–2)	Allen Arena (1,722); Nashville, TN
01/07/2013; 7:15 pm		USC Upstate	L 61–98	6–9 (1–3)	Allen Arena (1,112); Nashville, TN
01/11/2013; 6:00 pm, ESPN3		at Northern Kentucky	L 53–67	6–10 (1–4)	Bank of Kentucky Center (2,891); Highland Heights, KY
01/17/2013; 6:05 pm		at Florida Gulf Coast	W 87–78 ^{OT}	7–10 (2–4)	Alico Arena (1,960); Fort Myers, FL
01/19/2013; 2:15 pm, ESPN3		at Stetson	L 69–85	7–11 (2–5)	Edmunds Center (1,017); DeLand, FL
01/24/2013; 6:30 pm, ESPN3		Kennesaw State	W 79–72 ^{OT}	8–11 (3–5)	Allen Arena (895); Nashville, TN
01/26/2013; 6:30 pm, ESPN3		Mercer	L 65–71	8–12 (3–6)	Allen Arena (2,926); Nashville, TN
01/31/2013; 6:00 pm, ESPN3		at USC Upstate	L 71–83	8–13 (3–7)	G. B. Hodge Center (712); Spartanburg, SC
02/02/2013; 3:00 pm		at East Tennessee State	L 88–90 ^{OT}	8–14 (3–8)	ETSU/MSHA Athletic Center (2,585); Johnson City, TN
02/08/2013; 6:00 pm, ESPN3		Northern Kentucky	W 76–58	9–14 (4–8)	Allen Arena (1,345); Nashville, TN
02/14/2013; 6:30 pm, ESPN3		Stetson	L 66–76	9–15 (4–9)	Allen Arena (683); Nashville, TN
02/16/2013; 6:30 pm, ESPN3		Florida Gulf Coast	W 84–74	10–15 (5–9)	Allen Arena (1,754); Nashville, TN
02/21/2013; 6:00 pm		at Mercer	L 58–83	10–16 (5–10)	Hawkins Arena (2,727); Macon, GA
02/23/2013; 1:30 pm		at Kennesaw State	W 70–55	11–16 (6–10)	KSU Convocation Center (1,288); Kennesaw, GA
02/28/2013; 7:15 pm, ESPN3		Jacksonville	W 77–73	12–16 (7–10)	Allen Arena (986); Nashville, TN
03/02/2013; 8:15 pm		North Florida	L 78–85	12–17 (7–11)	Allen Arena (2,674); Nashville, TN
Atlantic Sun tournament
03/06/2013; 7:30 pm, CSS/ESPN3	(8)	at (1) Mercer; Quarterfinals	L 48–82	12–18	Hawkins Arena (3,527); Macon, GA
*Non-conference game. ^{#}Rankings from AP Poll. (#) Tournament seedings in parentheses. All times are in Central Time.
