= 2012–13 East Tennessee State Buccaneers men's basketball team =

American college basketball season

2012–13 East Tennessee State Buccaneers men's basketball
- Conference: Atlantic Sun Conference
- Record: 10–22 (8–10 A-Sun)
- Head coach: Murry Bartow (10th season)
- Assistant coaches: Scott Wagers; Mike Boyd; Thomas Johnson
- Home arena: ETSU/Mountain States Health Alliance Athletic Center

2012–13 Atlantic Sun men's basketball standings
	Conf.				Overall
Team	W		L	PCT	W		L	PCT
Mercer	14	–	4	.778	24	–	12	.667
Florida Gulf Coast †	13	–	5	.722	26	–	11	.703
Stetson	11	–	7	.611	15	–	16	.484
USC Upstate	9	–	9	.500	16	–	17	.485
Jacksonville	9	–	9	.500	14	–	18	.438
Northern Kentucky*	9	–	9	.500	11	–	16	.407
North Florida	8	–	10	.444	13	–	19	.406
East Tennessee State	8	–	10	.444	10	–	22	.313
Lipscomb	7	–	11	.389	12	–	18	.400
Kennesaw State	2	–	16	.111	3	–	27	.100
† 2013 Atlantic Sun Tournament winner As of March 29, 2013; Rankings from AP Poll *ineligible for postseason play due to Div. I transition

The 2012–13 East Tennessee State Buccaneers basketball team represented East Tennessee State University during the 2012–13 NCAA Division I men's basketball season. The Buccaneers, led by 10th year head coach Murry Bartow, played their home games at the ETSU/Mountain States Health Alliance Athletic Center and were members of the Atlantic Sun Conference. They finished the season 10–22, 8–10 in A-Sun play to finish in eighth place. They lost in the quarterfinals of the Atlantic Sun tournament to Stetson.

== Roster ==
Number	Name	Position	Height	Weight	Year	Hometown
1	Petey McClain	Guard	6–0	185	Freshman	Mobile, Alabama
2	Jarvis Jones	Guard	6–2	190	Senior	Memphis, Tennessee
3	Mario Stramaglia	Guard	6–2	180	Freshman	Birmingham, Alabama
4	Rashawn Rembert	Guard	6–3	185	Sophomore	Tampa, Florida
5	Sheldon Cooley	Guard	6–3	180	Senior	Tampa, Florida
11	Todd Halvorsen	Forward/Guard	6–6	205	Junior	Kingsport, Tennessee
12	Yunio Barrueta	Guard	6–4	215	Freshman	Miami, Florida
15	Lester Wilson	Forward	6–4	205	Freshman	Knoxville, Tennessee
20	Hunter Harris	Forward	6–7	220	Junior	Nashville, Tennessee
21	John Walton	Forward	6–7	200	Sophomore	Memphis, Tennessee
23	Marcus Dubose	Guard	6–2	180	Senior	Hartsville, South Carolina
34	Lukas Poderis	Forward	6–8	230	Senior	Port Richey, Florida
35	Kinard Gadsden-Gilliard	Forward	6–5	250	Junior	Georgetown, South Carolina
44	Ron Giplaye	Forward	6–6	230	Junior	Lowell, Massachusetts

== Schedule ==
Date time, TV	Opponent	Result	Record	Site (attendance) city, state
Exhibition
11/03/2012*; 4:00 pm	Carson-Newman	W 71–63		ETSU/MSHA Athletic Center (3,033); Johnson City, TN
Regular season
11/10/2012*; 2:00 pm	at Virginia Tech	L 62–80	0–1	Cassell Coliseum (6,632); Blacksburg, VA
11/17/2012*; 4:00 pm	Tennessee Tech	L 62–65	0–2	ETSU/MSHA Athletic Center (2,526); Johnson City, TN
11/20/2012*; 7:30 pm	at Charleston Southern	W 59–57	1–2	CSU Field House (901); Charleston, SC
11/23/2012*; 7:00 pm	at Georgia	L 38–54	1–3	Stegeman Coliseum (4,869); Athens, GA
11/29/2012*; 7:00 pm	Milligan	W 94–46	2–3	ETSU/MSHA Athletic Center (2,520); Johnson City, TN
12/05/2012*; 7:00 pm	at James Madison	L 45–70	2–4	JMU Convocation Center (2,599); Harrisonburg, VA
12/08/2012*; 7:30 pm, ESPN3	at No. 20 North Carolina	L 55–78	2–5	Dean E. Smith Center (17,307); Chapel Hill, NC
12/14/2012*; 8:00 pm, ESPN3	at Ole Miss	L 55–77	2–6	Tad Smith Coliseum (3,411); Oxford, MS
12/18/2012*; 7:00 pm	Charleston Southern	L 51–72	2–7	Brooks Gym (1,275); Johnson City, TN
12/22/2012*; 10:30 pm, ESPNU	vs. No. 4 Arizona; Diamond Head Classic	L 53–73	2–8	Stan Sheriff Center (8,120); Honolulu, HI
12/23/2012*; 9:00 pm, ESPNU	at Hawaiʻi; Diamond Head Classic	L 61–84	2–9	Stan Sheriff Center (6,564); Honolulu, HI
12/25/2012*; 2:00 pm, ESPN3	vs. San Francisco; Diamond Head Classic	L 49–67	2–10	Stan Sheriff Center; Honolulu, HI
01/02/2013*; 7:00 pm	VCU	L 58–109	2–11	ETSU/MSHA Athletic Center (3,066); Johnson City, TN
01/05/2013; 7:30 pm	at Lipscomb	L 56–60	2–12 (0–1)	Allen Arena (1,722); Nashville, TN
01/07/2013; 7:30 pm	at Northern Kentucky	W 49–44	3–12 (1–1)	Bank of Kentucky Center (1,798); Highland Heights, KY
01/10/2013; 7:00 pm	Stetson	L 70–72	3–13 (1–2)	ETSU/MSHA Athletic Center (2,329); Johnson City, TN
01/12/2013; 4:00 pm	Florida Gulf Coast	W 85–75	4–13 (2–2)	ETSU/MSHA Athletic Center (2,446); Johnson City, TN
01/17/2013; 7:00 pm, ESPN3	at Mercer	L 59–78	4–14 (2–3)	Hawkins Arena (2,672); Macon, GA
01/19/2013; 2:30 pm	at Kennesaw State	W 70–60	5–14 (3–3)	KSU Convocation Center (1,002); Kennesaw, GA
01/24/2013; 7:00 pm	Jacksonville	L 80–83	5–15 (3–4)	ETSU/MSHA Athletic Center (2,638); Johnson City, TN
01/26/2013; 4:00 pm	North Florida	W 89–75	6–15 (4–4)	ETSU/MSHA Athletic Center (2,795); Johnson City, TN
01/28/2013; 7:30 pm	at USC Upstate	L 71–88	6–16 (4–5)	G. B. Hodge Center (677); Spartanburg, SC
01/31/2013; 7:00 pm	Northern Kentucky	L 68–70	6–17 (4–6)	ETSU/MSHA Athletic Center (2,949); Johnson City, TN
02/02/2013; 4:00 pm	Lipscomb	W 90–88 ^{OT}	7–17 (5–6)	ETSU/MSHA Athletic Center (2,585); Johnson City, TN
02/07/2013; 7:00 pm	at Florida Gulf Coast	L 43–67	7–18 (5–7)	Alico Arena (2,832); Fort Myers, FL
02/09/2013; 3:15 pm	at Stetson	W 62–61	8–18 (6–7)	Edmunds Center (1,028); DeLand, FL
02/14/2013; 7:00 pm	Kennesaw State	W 79–70	9–18 (7–7)	ETSU/MSHA Athletic Center (2,453); Johnson City, TN
02/16/2013; 4:00 pm	Mercer	L 54–71	9–19 (7–8)	ETSU/MSHA Athletic Center (2,127); Johnson City, TN
02/21/2013; 7:00 pm	at North Florida	L 64–77	9–20 (7–9)	UNF Arena (1,604); Jacksonville, FL
02/23/2013; 3:15 pm, ESPN3	at Jacksonville	W 61–58	10–20 (8–9)	Jacksonville Veterans Memorial Arena (1,216); Jacksonville, FL
03/01/2013; 7:00 pm, ESPN3	USC Upstate	L 56–88	10–21 (8–10)	ETSU/MSHA Athletic Center (4,389); Johnson City, TN
Atlantic Sun tournament
03/07/2013; 2:30 pm, CSS/ESPN3	vs. Stetson; Quarterfinals	L 46–67	10–22	Hawkins Arena (N/A); Macon, GA
*Non-conference game. ^{#}Rankings from AP Poll. (#) Tournament seedings in parentheses. All times are in Eastern Time.
