= 2012–13 Stetson Hatters men's basketball team =

American college basketball season

2012–13 Stetson Hatters men's basketball
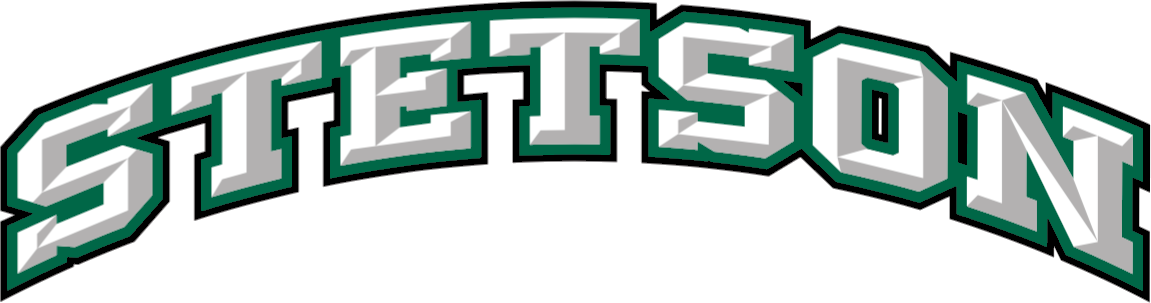
- Conference: Atlantic Sun Conference
- Record: 15–16 (11–7 A-Sun)
- Head coach: Casey Alexander (2nd season)
- Assistant coaches: Roger Idstrom; Steve Drabyn; Dwight Evans
- Home arena: Edmunds Center

2012–13 Atlantic Sun men's basketball standings
| | Conf. | | | | Overall |
| Team | W | | L | PCT | W | | L | PCT |
|---|---|---|---|---|---|---|---|---|
| Mercer | 14 | – | 4 | .778 | 24 | – | 12 | .667 |
| Florida Gulf Coast † | 13 | – | 5 | .722 | 26 | – | 11 | .703 |
| Stetson | 11 | – | 7 | .611 | 15 | – | 16 | .484 |
| USC Upstate | 9 | – | 9 | .500 | 16 | – | 17 | .485 |
| Jacksonville | 9 | – | 9 | .500 | 14 | – | 18 | .438 |
| Northern Kentucky* | 9 | – | 9 | .500 | 11 | – | 16 | .407 |
| North Florida | 8 | – | 10 | .444 | 13 | – | 19 | .406 |
| East Tennessee State | 8 | – | 10 | .444 | 10 | – | 22 | .313 |
| Lipscomb | 7 | – | 11 | .389 | 12 | – | 18 | .400 |
| Kennesaw State | 2 | – | 16 | .111 | 3 | – | 27 | .100 |
† 2013 Atlantic Sun Tournament winner As of March 29, 2013; Rankings from AP Poll *ineligible for postseason play due to Div. I transition

The 2012–13 Stetson Hatters men's basketball team represented Stetson University during the 2012–13 NCAA Division I men's basketball season. The Hatters, led by second year head coach Casey Alexander, played their home games at the Edmunds Center and were members of the Atlantic Sun Conference. They finished the season 15–16, 11–7 in A-Sun play to finish in third place. They advanced to the semifinals of the Atlantic Sun tournament where they lost to Florida Gulf Coast.

== Roster ==
| Number | Name | Position | Height | Weight | Year | Hometown |
|---|---|---|---|---|---|---|
| 1 | Dennis Diaz | Guard | 6–3 | 185 | Sophomore | Deltona, Florida |
| 2 | Leke Solanke | Forward | 6–5 | 215 | Freshman | Abeokuta, Nigeria |
| 3 | Willie Green | Forward | 6–6 | 200 | Junior | Orlando, Florida |
| 4 | Logan Irwin | Guard | 5–10 | 170 | Freshman | South Whitley, Indiana |
| 10 | Hunter Miller | Guard | 6–1 | 180 | Junior | Nashville, Tennessee |
| 11 | Aaron Graham | Guard | 6–3 | 180 | Junior | Miramar, Florida |
| 12 | Joel Naburgs | Guard | 6–4 | 200 | Senior | Victoria, Australia |
| 14 | Brian Pegg | Guard | 6–7 | 205 | Freshman | Clearwater, Florida |
| 22 | Tanner Plemmons | Guard | 6–1 | 190 | Freshman | Franklin, North Carolina |
| 23 | Chris Perez | Guard | 6–3 | 210 | Junior | Santiago de los Caballeros, Dominican Republic |
| 24 | Liam McInerney | Forward/Center | 6–8 | 230 | Senior | Port Campbell, Australia |
| 33 | J.R. Weston | Guard/Forward | 6–4 | 205 | Senior | Morral, Ohio |
| 40 | Kyle Sikora | Center | 7–0 | 245 | Sophomore | Key Largo, Florida |
| 41 | Adam Pegg | Center | 6–9 | 260 | Senior | Clearwater, Florida |

== Schedule ==
| Date time, TV | Opponent | Result | Record | Site (attendance) city, state |
Exhibition
| 10/29/2012*; 7:00 pm | Flagler | W 79–71 | | Edmunds Center (315); DeLand, FL |
Regular season
| 11/09/2012*; 5:30 pm, ESPN3 | at Miami (FL) | L 79–87 | 0–1 | BankUnited Center (2,610); Coral Gables, FL |
| 11/13/2012*; 7:00 pm | Florida A&M | W 88–66 | 1–1 | Edmunds Center (615); DeLand, FL |
| 11/19/2012*; 7:00 pm | Southeastern University | W 81–59 | 2–1 | Edmunds Center (655); DeLand, FL |
| 11/26/2012*; 7:00 pm | South Florida | L 54–63 | 2–2 | Edmunds Center (1,063); DeLand, FL |
| 11/28/2012*; 7:30 pm | at VCU | L 56–92 | 2–3 | Stuart C. Siegel Center (7,693); Richmond, VA |
| 12/03/2012*; 7:00 pm | at Bethune-Cookman | L 63–86 | 2–4 | Moore Gymnasium (2,269); Daytona Beach, FL |
| 12/06/2012*; 7:00 pm | Florida Atlantic | L 78–88 | 2–5 | Edmunds Center (917); DeLand, FL |
| 12/09/2012*; 2:00 pm | FIU | L 79–82 | 2–6 | Edmunds Center (647); DeLand, FL |
| 12/15/2012*; 6:00 pm | at Richmond | L 57–76 | 2–7 | Robins Center (4,672); Richmond, VA |
| 12/18/2012*; 7:00 pm | at Florida Atlantic | W 69–68 | 3–7 | FAU Arena (1,027); Boca Raton, FL |
| 12/21/2012*; 7:00 pm | at UCF | L 66–83 | 3–8 | UCF Arena (3,764); Orlando, FL |
| 12/31/2012; 4:30 pm, CSS | at Mercer | L 64–70 | 3–9 (0–1) | Hawkins Arena (2,427); Macon, GA |
| 01/02/2013; 5:00 pm | at Kennesaw State | W 70–60 | 4–9 (1–1) | KSU Convocation Center (422); Kennesaw, GA |
| 01/05/2013; 3:15 pm | North Florida | L 74–90 | 4–10 (1–2) | Edmunds Center (1,004); DeLand, FL |
| 01/07/2013; 5:15 pm | Jacksonville | W 81–72 | 5–10 (2–2) | Edmunds Center (534); DeLand, FL |
| 01/10/2013; 7:00 pm | at East Tennessee State | W 72–70 | 6–10 (3–2) | ETSU/MSHA Athletic Center (2,329); Johnson City, TN |
| 01/12/2013; 5:00 pm | at USC Upstate | W 66–64 | 7–10 (4–2) | G. B. Hodge Center (818); Spartanburg, SC |
| 01/17/2013; 7:00 pm | Northern Kentucky | W 71–59 | 8–10 (5–2) | Edmunds Center (1,479); DeLand, FL |
| 01/19/2013; 3:15 pm, ESPN3 | Lipscomb | W 85–69 | 9–10 (6–2) | Edmunds Center (1,017); DeLand, FL |
| 01/25/2013; 7:05 pm, CSS/ESPN3 | at Florida Gulf Coast | L 65–96 | 9–11 (6–3) | Alico Arena (3,002); Fort Myers, FL |
| 01/31/2013; 7:00 pm | at Jacksonville | L 70–71 | 9–12 (6–4) | Swisher Gymnasium (1,012); Jacksonville, FL |
| 02/02/2013; 4:30 pm | at North Florida | L 59–64 | 9–13 (6–5) | UNF Arena (1,589); Jacksonville, FL |
| 02/07/2013; 7:00 pm | at USC Upstate | W 73–66 | 10–13 (7–5) | Edmunds Center (746); DeLand, FL |
| 02/09/2013; 3:15 pm | at East Tennessee State | L 61–62 | 10–14 (7–6) | Edmunds Center (1,028); DeLand, FL |
| 02/14/2013; 7:30 pm, ESPN3 | Lipscomb | W 76–66 | 11–14 (8–6) | Allen Arena (683); Nashville, TN |
| 02/16/2013; 7:00 pm | at Northern Kentucky | W 62–46 | 12–14 (9–6) | The Bank of Kentucky Center (3,223); Highland Heights, KY |
| 02/22/2013; 7:00 pm, CSS/ESPN3 | Florida Gulf Coast | W 80–71 | 13–14 (10–6) | Edmunds Center (1,342); DeLand, FL |
| 02/28/2013; 7:15 pm | Kennesaw State | W 91–77 | 14–14 (11–6) | Edmunds Center (1,043); DeLand, FL |
| 03/02/2013; 3:15 pm | Mercer | L 65–77 | 14–15 (11–7) | Edmunds Center (924); DeLand, FL |
2013 Atlantic Sun men's basketball tournament
| 03/07/2013; 2:30 pm, CSS/ESPN3 | vs. East Tennessee State; Quarterfinals | W 67–46 | 15–15 | Hawkins Arena (N/A); Macon, GA |
| 03/08/2013; 8:00 pm, CSS | vs. Florida Gulf Coast; Semifinals | L 58–72 | 15–16 | Hawkins Arena (3,527); Macon, GA |
*Non-conference game. ^{#}Rankings from AP Poll. (#) Tournament seedings in parentheses. All times are in Eastern Time.
