= 2012–13 USC Upstate Spartans men's basketball team =

American college basketball season

2012–13 USC Upstate Spartans men's basketball
- Conference: Atlantic Sun Conference
- Record: 16–17 (9–9 A-Sun)
- Head coach: Eddie Payne (11th season)
- Assistant coaches: Kyle Perry; Kente Hart; Luke Payne
- Home arena: G. B. Hodge Center

2012–13 Atlantic Sun men's basketball standings
	Conf.				Overall
Team	W		L	PCT	W		L	PCT
Mercer	14	–	4	.778	24	–	12	.667
Florida Gulf Coast †	13	–	5	.722	26	–	11	.703
Stetson	11	–	7	.611	15	–	16	.484
USC Upstate	9	–	9	.500	16	–	17	.485
Jacksonville	9	–	9	.500	14	–	18	.438
Northern Kentucky*	9	–	9	.500	11	–	16	.407
North Florida	8	–	10	.444	13	–	19	.406
East Tennessee State	8	–	10	.444	10	–	22	.313
Lipscomb	7	–	11	.389	12	–	18	.400
Kennesaw State	2	–	16	.111	3	–	27	.100
† 2013 Atlantic Sun Tournament winner As of March 29, 2013; Rankings from AP Poll *ineligible for postseason play due to Div. I transition

The 2012–13 USC Upstate Spartans men's basketball team represented the University of South Carolina Upstate during the 2012–13 NCAA Division I men's basketball season. The Spartans, led by 11th year head coach Eddie Payne, played their home games at the G. B. Hodge Center and were members of the Atlantic Sun Conference. They finished the season 16–17, 9–9 in A-Sun play to finish in a three-way tie for fourth place. They advanced to the semifinals of the Atlantic Sun tournament where they lost to Mercer.

== Roster ==
Number	Name	Position	Height	Weight	Year	Hometown
1	Dee Washington	Forward	6–4	200	Freshman	Franklin, North Carolina
3	Jeremy Ford	Guard	6–1	170	Junior	Varnville, South Carolina
5	Ty Greene	Guard	6–2	180	Sophomore	Knoxville, Tennessee
12	Ricardo Glenn	Forward	6–8	246	Junior	Augusta, Georgia
14	David Lighty	Forward	6–7	215	Junior	Darlington, South Carolina
15	Adrian Rodgers	Guard	6–4	205	Sophomore	Alpharetta, Georgia
22	Zach Lillie	Forward	6–7	210	Freshman	Athens, Georgia
23	Torrey Craig	Forward	6–6	215	Junior	Great Falls, South Carolina
24	Jodd Maxey	Forward	6–8	200	Junior	Statham, Georgia
25	Bruce Haynes	Guard	6–2	195	Sophomore	Summerville, South Carolina
30	Rob Elam	Forward	6–6	218	Senior	East Point, Georgia
31	Mario Blessing	Guard	6–2	165	Sophomore	Kusterdingen, Germany
32	Fred Miller	Guard	6–4	200	Sophomore	Atlanta, Georgia
34	Babatunde Olumuyiwa	Forward/Center	6–8	220	Junior	Athens, Georgia
44	Michael Buchanan	Center	6–11	250	Freshman	Las Vegas, Nevada

== Schedule ==
Date time, TV	Opponent	Result	Record	Site (attendance) city, state
Regular season
11/09/2012*; 8:00 pm	at Saint Louis; CBE Classic	L 59–76	0–1	Chaifetz Arena (6,958); St. Louis, MO
11/12/2012*; 7:00 pm	Hiwassee	W 90–36	1–1	G. B. Hodge Center (689); Spartanburg, SC
11/17/2012*; 3:00 pm	at UTSA	L 59–67	1–2	Convocation Center (1,015); San Antonio, TX
11/20/2012*; 9:00 pm	at Santa Clara; CBE Classic	L 65–85	1–3	Leavey Center (1,139); Santa Clara, CA
11/21/2012*; 9:00 pm	vs. Eastern Washington; CBE Classic	L 70–75	1–4	Leavey Center (1,164); Santa Clara, CA
11/23/2012*; 5:00 pm	vs. Utah Valley; CBE Classic	W 75–50	2–4	Leavey Center (1,156); Santa Clara, CA
11/29/2012*; 7:00 pm	at UNC Asheville	W 73–71	3–4	Kimmel Arena (1,542); Asheville, NC
12/02/2012*; 2:00 pm	at Kansas State	L 53–72	3–5	Bramlage Coliseum (12,223); Manhattan, KS
12/08/2012*; 2:30 pm	UTSA	W 88–77	4–5	G. B. Hodge Center (775); Spartanburg, SC
12/17/2012*; 8:00 pm	at Baylor	L 57–73	4–6	Ferrell Center (6,639); Waco, TX
12/21/2012*; 8:00 pm	at Tennessee State	L 64–67	4–7	Gentry Complex (327); Nashville, TN
12/30/2012*; 3:00 pm	Coastal Georgia	W 85–55	5–7	G. B. Hodge Center (491); Spartanburg, SC
01/02/2013*; 7:30 pm	Hampton	W 68–49	6–7	G. B. Hodge Center (721); Spartanburg, SC
01/05/2013; 7:00 pm	at Northern Kentucky	W 60–54	7–7 (1–0)	The Bank of Kentucky Center (2,788); Highland Heights, KY
01/07/2013; 8:15 pm	at Lipscomb	W 98–61	8–7 (2–0)	Allen Arena (1,112); Nashville, TN
01/10/2013; 7:00 pm	Florida Gulf Coast	L 71–72 ^{OT}	8–8 (2–1)	G. B. Hodge Center (759); Spartanburg, SC
01/12/2013; 5:00 pm	Stetson	L 64–66	8–9 (2–2)	G. B. Hodge Center (818); Spartanburg, SC
01/17/2013; 7:00 pm	at Kennesaw State	W 66–54	9–9 (3–2)	KSU Convocation Center (1,056); Kennesaw, GA
01/19/2013; 4:30 pm	at Mercer	L 74–82	9–10 (3–3)	Hawkins Arena (2,734); Macon, GA
01/24/2013; 7:00 pm, ESPN3	North Florida	W 63–57	10–10 (4–3)	G. B. Hodge Center (688); Spartanburg, SC
01/26/2013; 5:00 pm, ESPN3	Jacksonville	W 79–64	11–10 (5–3)	G. B. Hodge Center (699); Spartanburg, SC
01/28/2013; 7:30 pm, ESPN3	East Tennessee State	W 88–71	12–10 (6–3)	G. B. Hodge Center (677); Spartanburg, SC
01/31/2013; 7:00 pm, ESPN3	Lipscomb	W 83–71	13–10 (7–3)	G. B. Hodge Center (712); Spartanburg, SC
02/02/2013; 5:00 pm, ESPN3	Northern Kentucky	L 65–70	13–11 (7–4)	G. B. Hodge Center (818); Spartanburg, SC
02/07/2013; 7:00 pm	at Stetson	L 66–73	13–12 (7–5)	Edmunds Center (746); DeLand, FL
02/09/2013; 5:15 pm, ESPN3	at Florida Gulf Coast	L 49–74	13–13 (7–6)	Alico Arena (3,621); Fort Myers, FL
02/14/2013; 9:00 pm, ESPN3	Mercer	L 59–70	13–14 (7–7)	G. B. Hodge Center (611); Spartanburg, SC
02/16/2013; 2:00 pm, ESPN3	Kennesaw State	W 79–67	14–14 (8–7)	G. B. Hodge Center (733); Spartanburg, SC
02/21/2013; 7:00 pm	at Jacksonville	L 64–68	14–15 (8–8)	Jacksonville Veterans Memorial Arena (757); Jacksonville, FL
02/23/2013; 4:30 pm	at North Florida	L 53–77	14–16 (8–9)	UNF Arena (1,651); Jacksonville, FL
03/01/2013; 7:00 pm, ESPN3	at East Tennessee State	W 88–56	15–16 (9–9)	ETSU/MSHA Athletic Center (4,389); Johnson City, TN
2013 Atlantic Sun men's basketball tournament
03/07/2013; 8:30 pm, CSS/ESPN3	vs. Jacksonville; Quarterfinals	W 76–62	16–16	Hawkins Arena (1,211); Macon, GA
03/08/2013; 5:30 pm, CSS	at Mercer; Semifinals	L 64–72	16–17	Hawkins Arena (3,527); Macon, GA
*Non-conference game. ^{#}Rankings from AP Poll. (#) Tournament seedings in parentheses. All times are in Eastern Time.
