= 2012–13 Kennesaw State Owls men's basketball team =

American college basketball season

2012–13 Kennesaw State Owls men's basketball
- Conference: Atlantic Sun Conference
- Record: 3–27 (2–16 A-Sun)
- Head coach: Lewis Preston (2nd season)
- Assistant coaches: Jimmy Lallathin; Marty McGillan; Darryl Slack
- Home arena: KSU Convocation Center

2012–13 Atlantic Sun men's basketball standings
	Conf.				Overall
Team	W		L	PCT	W		L	PCT
Mercer	14	–	4	.778	24	–	12	.667
Florida Gulf Coast †	13	–	5	.722	26	–	11	.703
Stetson	11	–	7	.611	15	–	16	.484
USC Upstate	9	–	9	.500	16	–	17	.485
Jacksonville	9	–	9	.500	14	–	18	.438
Northern Kentucky*	9	–	9	.500	11	–	16	.407
North Florida	8	–	10	.444	13	–	19	.406
East Tennessee State	8	–	10	.444	10	–	22	.313
Lipscomb	7	–	11	.389	12	–	18	.400
Kennesaw State	2	–	16	.111	3	–	27	.100
† 2013 Atlantic Sun Tournament winner As of March 29, 2013; Rankings from AP Poll *ineligible for postseason play due to Div. I transition

The 2012–13 Kennesaw State Owls men's basketball team represented Kennesaw State University during the 2012–13 NCAA Division I men's basketball season. The Owls, led by second year head coach Lewis Preston, played their home games at the KSU Convocation Center and were members of the Atlantic Sun Conference.

They finished the season 3–27, 2–16 in A-Sun play to finish in last place. They failed to qualify for the Atlantic Sun Basketball tournament.

== Roster ==
Number	Name	Position	Height	Weight	Year	Hometown
0	Myles Hamilton	Guard	6–1	190	Freshman	Cleveland, Ohio
1	Nigel Pruitt	Forward	6–7	180	Sophomore	Potomac, Maryland
2	Markeith Cummings	Guard	6–6	240	Senior	Birmingham, Alabama
3	Delbert Love	Guard	6–0	185	Sophomore	Cleveland, Ohio
4	Yonel Brown	Guard	5–9	160	Freshman	Lawrenceville, Georgia
5	Bernard Morena	Forward	6–8	200	Freshman	Ivory Coast
10	Cole Hobbs	Guard	6–7	185	Freshman	Atlanta
13	Jordan Montgomery	Guard/Forward	6–5	175	Freshman	Orlando, Florida
21	Aaron Anderson	Forward	6–7	220	Senior	Tucson, Arizona
25	Kris Drees	Forward	6–6	210	Junior	Cumming, Georgia
35	Brandon Dawson	Forward	6–7	220	Junior	Atlanta
45	Andrew Osemhen	Forward	6–9	270	Junior	Loganville, Georgia
50	Willy Kouassi	Center	6–10	220	Sophomore	Ivory Coast

== Schedule ==
Date time, TV	Opponent	Result	Record	Site (attendance) city, state
Regular season
11/09/2012*; 7:00 pm	at Tennessee	L 67–76	0–1	Thompson–Boling Arena (18,044); Knoxville, Tennessee
11/12/2012*; 7:30 pm	at South Carolina State	W 67–65 ^{OT}	1–1	SHM Memorial Center (1,687); Orangeburg, South Carolina
11/16/2012*; 6:00 pm	at Eastern Kentucky; Comfort Suites Invitational	L 71–85	1–2	McBrayer Arena (1,150); Richmond, Kentucky
11/17/2012*; 8:00 pm	vs. Radford; Comfort Suites Invitational	L 58–67	1–3	McBrayer Arena (150); Richmond, Kentucky
11/18/2012*; 7:00 pm	vs. Towson; Comfort Suites Invitational	L 63–69	1–4	McBrayer Arena (150); Richmond, Kentucky
11/21/2012*; 7:00 pm	Georgia Southern	L 46–62	1–5	KSU Convocation Center (1,036); Kennesaw, Georgia
11/24/2012*; 2:30 pm	Chattanooga	L 51–65	1–6	KSU Convocation Center (552); Kennesaw, Georgia
12/01/2012*; 7:00 pm	at Tennessee–Martin	L 63–65	1–7	Skyhawk Arena (1,638); Martin, Tennessee
12/16/2012*; 4:00 pm	Charlotte	L 52–66	1–8	KSU Convocation Center (1,115); Kennesaw, Georgia
12/19/2012*; 7:00 pm, ESPN3	at No. 22 Notre Dame	L 57–85	1–9	Purcell Pavilion (6,772); Notre Dame, Indiana
12/21/2012*; 7:00 pm	at IPFW	L 47–70	1–10	Allen County War Memorial Coliseum (1,263); Fort Wayne, Indiana
12/23/2012*; 5:00 pm, Pitt Panthers TV/ESPN3	at Pittsburgh	L 43–59	1–11	Petersen Events Center (8,125); Pittsburgh
12/31/2012; 5:00 pm	Florida Gulf Coast	L 59–68	1–12 (0–1)	KSU Convocation Center (821); Kennesaw, Georgia
01/02/2013; 5:00 pm	Stetson	L 60–70	1–13 (0–2)	KSU Convocation Center (422); Kennesaw, Georgia
01/05/2013; 2:30 pm, ESPN3	Mercer	W 83–75	2–13 (1–2)	KSU Convocation Center (1,981); Kennesaw, Georgia
01/10/2013; 7:00 pm	at Jacksonville	L 92–99 ^{3OT}	2–14 (1–3)	Jacksonville Veterans Memorial Arena (917); Jacksonville, Florida
01/12/2013; 4:30 pm	at North Florida	L 72–81	2–15 (1–4)	UNF Arena (1,018); Jacksonville, Florida
01/17/2013; 7:00 pm	USC Upstate	L 54–66	2–16 (1–5)	KSU Convocation Center (1,056); Kennesaw, Georgia
01/19/2013; 2:30 pm	East Tennessee State	L 60–70	2–17 (1–6)	KSU Convocation Center (1,002); Kennesaw, Georgia
01/24/2013; 7:30 pm, ESPN3	at Lipscomb	L 72–79 ^{OT}	2–18 (1–7)	Allen Arena (895); Nashville, Tennessee
01/26/2013; 7:00 pm	Northern Kentucky	L 53–64	2–19 (1–8)	Bank of Kentucky Center (4,716); Highland Heights, Kentucky
02/01/2013; 7:00 pm, CSS/ESPN3	at Mercer	L 42–66	2–20 (1–9)	Hawkins Arena (3,072); Macon, Georgia
02/07/2013; 7:00 pm	North Florida	L 52–60	2–21 (1–10)	KSU Convocation Center (2,148); Kennesaw, Georgia
02/09/2013; 2:30 pm	at Jacksonville	W 75–68	3–21 (2–10)	KSU Convocation Center (1,757); Kennesaw, Georgia
02/14/2013; 7:00 pm	at East Tennessee State	L 70–79	3–22 (2–11)	ETSU/MSHA Athletic Center (2,453); Johnson City, Tennessee
02/16/2013; 2:00 pm, ESPN3	at USC Upstate	L 67–79	3–23 (2–12)	G. B. Hodge Center (733); Spartanburg, South Carolina
02/21/2013; 7:00 pm	Northern Kentucky	L 54–64	3–24 (2–13)	KSU Convocation Center (1,115); Kennesaw, Georgia
02/23/2013; 2:30 pm	Lipscomb	L 55–70	3–25 (2–14)	KSU Convocation Center (1,288); Kennesaw, Georgia
02/28/2013; 7:15 pm	at Stetson	L 77–91	3–26 (2–15)	Edmunds Center (1,043); DeLand, Florida
03/02/2013; 5:15 pm	at Florida Gulf Coast	L 49–67	3–27 (2–16)	Alico Arena (2,574); Fort Myers, Florida
*Non-conference game. ^{#}Rankings from AP Poll. (#) Tournament seedings in parentheses. All times are in Eastern Time.
