= 2012–13 Jacksonville Dolphins men's basketball team =

American college basketball season

2012–13 Jacksonville Dolphins men's basketball
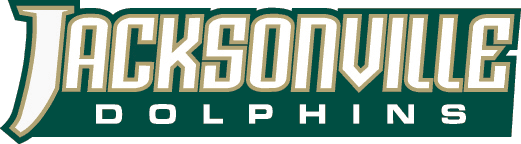
- Conference: Atlantic Sun Conference
- Record: 14–18 (9–9 A-Sun)
- Head coach: Cliff Warren (8th season)
- Assistant coach: Winston Neal; Trevor Quinn; Willie Jones
- Home arena: Veterans Memorial Arena; Swisher Gymnasium

2012–13 Atlantic Sun men's basketball standings
	Conf.				Overall
Team	W		L	PCT	W		L	PCT
Mercer	14	–	4	.778	24	–	12	.667
Florida Gulf Coast †	13	–	5	.722	26	–	11	.703
Stetson	11	–	7	.611	15	–	16	.484
USC Upstate	9	–	9	.500	16	–	17	.485
Jacksonville	9	–	9	.500	14	–	18	.438
Northern Kentucky*	9	–	9	.500	11	–	16	.407
North Florida	8	–	10	.444	13	–	19	.406
East Tennessee State	8	–	10	.444	10	–	22	.313
Lipscomb	7	–	11	.389	12	–	18	.400
Kennesaw State	2	–	16	.111	3	–	27	.100
† 2013 Atlantic Sun Tournament winner As of March 29, 2013; Rankings from AP Poll *ineligible for postseason play due to Div. I transition

The 2012–13 Jacksonville Dolphins men's basketball team represented Jacksonville University during the 2012–13 NCAA Division I men's basketball season. The Dolphins were members of the Atlantic Sun Conference (A-Sun). They were led by head coach Cliff Warren, and played their home games in both the Veterans Memorial Arena and Swisher Gymnasium. They finished the season 14–18, 9–9 in A-Sun play to finish in a three way tie for fourth place.

They lost in the quarterfinals of the Atlantic Sun tournament to USC Upstate.

== Roster ==
Number	Name	Position	Height	Weight	Year	Hometown
0	Javon Dawson	Forward	6–6	260	Junior	Cordele, Georgia
1	Jeremy Bogus	Guard	6–5	190	Sophomore	Birmingham, Alabama
2	Russell Powell	Guard	5–9	185	Senior	Newnan, Georgia
5	Evin Graham	Guard	6–3	185	Sophomore	Fort Myers, Florida
10	Marcellous Bell	Guard	5–11	175	Freshman	Hyattsville, Maryland
11	Jarvis Haywood	Guard	6–4	185	Freshman	Charlotte, North Carolina
20	Dylan Fritsch	Forward	6–6	188	Junior	Albuquerque, New Mexico
21	Keith McDougald	Guard	6–1	206	Junior	Jacksonville, Florida
22	Admir Sahbegovic	Forward	6–7	215	Sophomore	Jacksonville, Florida
23	Kordario Fleming	Forward	6–6	210	Freshman	Memphis, Tennessee
42	Glenn Powell	Forward	6–6	220	Senior	Deerfield Beach, Florida
44	Tyler Alderman	Center	6–9	235	Freshman	Fishers, Indiana

== Schedule ==
Date time, TV	Opponent	Result	Record	Site (attendance) city, state
Regular season
11/09/2012*; 7:00 pm	at Georgia	L 62–68	0–1	Stegeman Coliseum (5,232); Athens, GA
11/13/2012*; 7:00 pm	Trinity Baptist	W 78–48	1–1	Veterans Memorial Arena (1,077); Jacksonville, FL
11/16/2012*; 7:00 pm, ESPN3	at Miami (FL)	L 57–73	1–2	BankUnited Center (3,135); Coral Gables, FL
11/19/2012*; 8:05 pm	at Missouri State; Hoops for Hope Challenge	W 64–58	2–2	JQH Arena (5,046); Springfield, MO
11/21/2012*; 8:30 pm	at Arkansas-Little Rock; Hoops for Hope Challenge	L 56–78	2–3	Jack Stephens Center (2,905); Little Rock, AR
11/23/2012*; 4:30 pm	vs. Rider; Hoops for Hope Challenge	L 71–86	2–4	Puerto Vallarta International Convention Center (112); Puerto Vallarta, MX
11/24/2012*; 4:30 pm	vs. Milwaukee; Hoops for Hope Challenge	W 71–66	3–4	Puerto Vallarta International Convention Center (257); Puerto Vallarta, MX
11/28/2012*; 7:30 pm	at South Carolina State	L 72–74	3–5	SHM Memorial Center (975); Orangeburg, SC
12/03/2012*; 7:00 pm	Florida Christian	W 89–66	4–5	Swisher Gymnasium (1,107); Jacksonville, FL
12/07/2012*; 7:00 pm	at South Carolina	L 74–91	4–6	Colonial Life Arena (6,980); Columbia, SC
12/18/2012*; 7:40 pm	Wofford	L 52–94	4–7	Veterans Memorial Arena (3,191); Jacksonville, FL
12/22/2012*; 3:00 pm	Furman	W 65–53	5–7	Veterans Memorial Arena (896); Jacksonville, FL
12/28/2012*; 8:00 pm, BTN	at No. 5 Indiana	L 59–93	5–8	Assembly Hall (17,472); Bloomington, IN
12/31/2012; 7:15 pm	Northern Kentucky	W 53–51	6–8 (1–0)	Veterans Memorial Arena (860); Jacksonville, FL
01/02/2013; 7:15 pm	Lipscomb	W 85–71	7–8 (2–0)	Veterans Memorial Arena (671); Jacksonville, FL
01/05/2013; 2:00 pm	at Florida Gulf Coast	L 55–78	7–9 (2–1)	Alico Arena (1,704); Fort Myers, FL
01/07/2013; 5:15 pm	at Stetson	L 72–81	7–10 (2–2)	Edmunds Center (534); DeLand, FL
01/10/2013; 7:00 pm	Kennesaw State	W 99–92 ^{3OT}	8–10 (3–2)	Veterans Memorial Arena (917); Jacksonville, FL
01/12/2013; 3:30 pm	Mercer	W 49–47	9–10 (4–2)	Veterans Memorial Arena (1,272); Jacksonville, FL
01/18/2013; 7:00 pm, CSS/ESPN3	at North Florida	W 77–68	10–10 (5–2)	UNF Arena (4,018); Jacksonville, FL
01/24/2013; 7:00 pm	at East Tennessee State	W 83–80	11–10 (6–2)	ETSU/MSHA Athletic Center (2,638); Johnson City, TN
01/26/2013; 5:00 pm, ESPN3	at USC Upstate	L 64–79	11–11 (6–3)	G. B. Hodge Center (699); Spartanburg, SC
01/31/2013; 7:00 pm	Stetson	W 71–70	12–11 (7–3)	Swisher Gymnasium (1,012); Jacksonville, FL
02/02/2013; 3:15 pm	Florida Gulf Coast	L 78–81	12–12 (7–4)	Swisher Gymnasium (899); Jacksonville, FL
02/07/2013; 7:00 pm	at Mercer	L 64–67 ^{OT}	12–13 (7–5)	Hawkins Arena (2,372); Macon, GA
02/09/2013; 2:30 pm	at Kennesaw State	L 68–75	12–14 (7–6)	KSU Convocation Center (1,757); Kennesaw, GA
02/15/2013; 7:00 pm, CSS/ESPN3	North Florida	W 70–68	13–14 (8–6)	Veterans Memorial Arena (4,637); Jacksonville, FL
02/21/2013; 7:00 pm	USC Upstate	W 68–64	14–14 (9–6)	Veterans Memorial Arena (757); Jacksonville, FL
02/23/2013; 3:15 pm, ESPN3	East Tennessee State	L 58–61	14–15 (9–7)	Veterans Memorial Arena (1,216); Jacksonville, FL
02/28/2013; 8:15 pm, ESPN3	at Lipscomb	L 73–77	14–16 (9–8)	Allen Arena (986); Nashville, TN
03/02/2013; 8:00 pm	at Northern Kentucky	L 62–66	14–17 (9–9)	Bank of Kentucky Center (6,719); Highland Heights, KY
2013 Atlantic Sun men's basketball tournament
03/07/2013; 8:30 pm, CSS/ESPN3	vs. USC Upstate; Quarterfinals	L 62–76	14–18	Hawkins Arena (1,211); Macon, GA
*Non-conference game. ^{#}Rankings from AP Poll. (#) Tournament seedings in parentheses. All times are in Eastern Time.
