= 2012–13 Northern Kentucky Norse men's basketball team =

American college basketball season

2012–13 Northern Kentucky Norse men's basketball
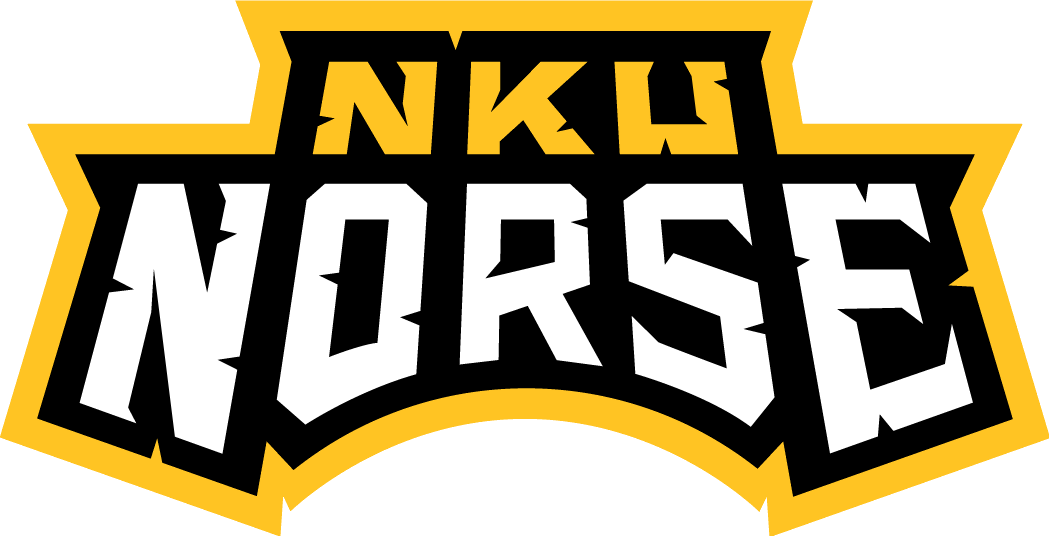
- Conference: Atlantic Sun Conference
- Record: 11–16 (9–9 A-Sun)
- Head coach: Dave Bezold (9th season)
- Assistant coaches: Kurt Young; Kevin Schappell; Darris Nichols
- Home arena: The Bank of Kentucky Center

2012–13 Atlantic Sun men's basketball standings
	Conf.				Overall
Team	W		L	PCT	W		L	PCT
Mercer	14	–	4	.778	24	–	12	.667
Florida Gulf Coast †	13	–	5	.722	26	–	11	.703
Stetson	11	–	7	.611	15	–	16	.484
USC Upstate	9	–	9	.500	16	–	17	.485
Jacksonville	9	–	9	.500	14	–	18	.438
Northern Kentucky*	9	–	9	.500	11	–	16	.407
North Florida	8	–	10	.444	13	–	19	.406
East Tennessee State	8	–	10	.444	10	–	22	.313
Lipscomb	7	–	11	.389	12	–	18	.400
Kennesaw State	2	–	16	.111	3	–	27	.100
† 2013 Atlantic Sun Tournament winner As of March 29, 2013; Rankings from AP Poll *ineligible for postseason play due to Div. I transition

The 2012–13 Northern Kentucky Norse men's basketball team represented Northern Kentucky University during the 2012–13 NCAA Division I men's basketball season. The Norse, led by 9th year head coach Dave Bezold, played their home games at The Bank of Kentucky Center and were members of the Atlantic Sun Conference.

They finished the season 11–16, 9–9 in A-Sun play to finish in a three-way tie for fourth place. Due to their transition to Division I, the Norse were ineligible to participate in post season play until 2017.

== Roster ==
Number	Name	Position	Height	Weight	Year	Hometown
1	Ethan Faulkner	Guard	6–1	185	Senior	Sandy Hook, Kentucky
2	Quinnten Fuller	Guard	6–0	165	Junior	Dayton, Ohio
5	Ernest Watson	Forward	6–7	190	Senior	Washington, D.C.
10	Tyler White	Guard	6–3	180	Freshman	Lima, Ohio
15	Jacob Rossi	Forward	6–8	215	Freshman	Franklin, Ohio
20	John Staley	Forward	6–5	205	Freshman	Kettering, Ohio
21	Jalen Billups	Forward/Center	6–6	225	Sophomore	Cincinnati, Ohio
23	Todd Johnson	Guard	5–9	170	Freshman	Elkhart, Indiana
24	Chad Jackson	Guard	6–4	195	Junior	Lexington, Kentucky
25	Jack Flournoy	Forward	6–6	200	Freshman	Mount Hope, West Virginia
30	Nate Snodgrass	Guard	6–1	170	Freshman	Butler, Pennsylvania
33	Anthony Monaco	Guard	6–4	185	Freshman	Dover, Ohio
35	Justin Rossi	Forward	6–8	210	Freshman	Franklin, Ohio
40	Eshaunte Jones	Forward/Guard	6–4	200	Senior	Fort Wayne, Indiana
42	Bill Pecora	Guard	6–2	195	Freshman	Clarksburg, West Virginia
	Jake Giesler	Forward	6–7	245	Sophomore	Fort Thomas, Kentucky

== Schedule ==
Date time, TV	Opponent	Result	Record	Site (attendance) city, state
Non-conference regular season
11/14/2012*; 10:00 pm	at San Diego; NUCDF Challenge	L 61–65	0–1	Jenny Craig Pavilion (1,297); San Diego, CA
11/15/2012*; 7:30 pm	vs. Tulsa; NUCDF Challenge	L 56–76	0–2	Jenny Craig Pavilion (1,288); San Diego, CA
11/17/2012*; 10:30 pm	vs. Siena; NUCDF Challenge	L 52–56	0–3	Jenny Craig Pavilion (647); San Diego, CA
11/18/2012*; 6:30 pm	vs. Cal State Northridge; NUCDF Challenge	L 58–69	0–4	Jenny Craig Pavilion (1,114); San Diego, CA
12/01/2012*; 4:30 pm, BTN	at No. 4 Ohio State	L 43–70	0–5	Value City Arena (16,548); Columbus, OH
12/04/2012*; 6:00 pm, FS Southwest	at Texas Tech	L 69–75	0–6	United Spirit Arena (7,758); Lubbock, TX
12/20/2012*; 7:00 pm	at Hampton	W 54–52	1–6	Hampton Convocation Center (326); Hampton, VA
12/22/2012*; 2:00 pm	at Navy	W 55–46	2–6	Alumni Hall (1,711); Annapolis, MD
Atlantic Sun regular season
12/31/2012; 7:15 pm	at Jacksonville	L 51–53	2–7 (0–1)	Jacksonville Veterans Memorial Arena (860); Jacksonville, FL
01/02/2013; 7:30 pm, ESPN3	at North Florida	W 65–52	3–7 (1–1)	UNF Arena (852); Jacksonville, FL
01/05/2013; 7:00 pm	USC Upstate	L 54–60	3–8 (1–2)	The Bank of Kentucky Center (2,788); Highland Heights, KY
01/07/2013; 7:30 pm	East Tennessee State	L 44–49	3–9 (1–3)	The Bank of Kentucky Center (1,798); Highland Heights, KY
01/11/2013; 7:00 pm, ESPN3	Lipscomb	W 67–53	4–9 (2–3)	The Bank of Kentucky Center (2,891); Highland Heights, KY
01/17/2013; 7:00 pm	at Stetson	L 59–71	4–10 (2–4)	Edmunds Center (1,479); DeLand, FL
01/19/2013; 5:15 pm	at Florida Gulf Coast	L 54–73	4–11 (2–5)	Alico Arena (2,189); Fort Myers, FL
01/24/2013; 7:00 pm	Mercer	W 63–46	5–11 (3–5)	The Bank of Kentucky Center (3,086); Highland Heights, KY
01/26/2013; 7:00 pm	Kennesaw State	W 64–53	6–11 (4–5)	The Bank of Kentucky Center (4,716); Highland Heights, KY
01/31/2013; 7:00 pm	at East Tennessee State	W 70–68	7–11 (5–5)	ETSU/MSHA Athletic Center (2,949); Johnson City, TN
02/02/2013; 5:00 pm, ESPN3	at USC Upstate	W 70–65	8–11 (6–5)	G. B. Hodge Center (818); Spartanburg, SC
02/08/2013; 7:00 pm, ESPN3	at Lipscomb	L 58–76	8–12 (6–6)	Allen Arena (1,345); Nashville, TN
02/14/2013; 7:00 pm	Florida Gulf Coast	L 53–60	8–13 (6–7)	The Bank of Kentucky Center (3,386); Highland Heights, KY
02/16/2013; 7:00 pm	Stetson	L 46–62	8–14 (6–8)	The Bank of Kentucky Center (3,223); Highland Heights, KY
02/21/2013; 7:00 pm	at Kennesaw State	W 64–54	9–14 (7–8)	KSU Convocation Center (1,115); Kennesaw, GA
02/23/2013; 4:30 pm	at Mercer	L 46–63	9–15 (7–9)	Hawkins Arena (3,527); Macon, GA
02/28/2013; 7:30 pm	North Florida	W 72–45	10–15 (8–9)	The Bank of Kentucky Center (3,356); Highland Heights, KY
03/02/2013; 8:00 pm	Jacksonville	W 66–62	11–15 (9–9)	The Bank of Kentucky Center (6,719); Highland Heights, KY
03/14/2013*; 10:00 pm	at San Francisco	L 68–73	11–16	War Memorial Gymnasium (1,367); San Francisco, CA
*Non-conference game. ^{#}Rankings from AP Poll. (#) Tournament seedings in parentheses. All times are in Eastern Time.
