= 2012–13 North Florida Ospreys men's basketball team =

American college basketball season

2012–13 North Florida Ospreys men's basketball
- Conference: Atlantic Sun Conference
- Record: 13–19 (8–10 A-Sun)
- Head coach: Matthew Driscoll (4th season)
- Assistant coaches: Bobby Kennen; Lee Moon Jr.; Byron Taylor
- Home arena: UNF Arena

2012–13 Atlantic Sun men's basketball standings
	Conf.				Overall
Team	W		L	PCT	W		L	PCT
Mercer	14	–	4	.778	24	–	12	.667
Florida Gulf Coast †	13	–	5	.722	26	–	11	.703
Stetson	11	–	7	.611	15	–	16	.484
USC Upstate	9	–	9	.500	16	–	17	.485
Jacksonville	9	–	9	.500	14	–	18	.438
Northern Kentucky*	9	–	9	.500	11	–	16	.407
North Florida	8	–	10	.444	13	–	19	.406
East Tennessee State	8	–	10	.444	10	–	22	.313
Lipscomb	7	–	11	.389	12	–	18	.400
Kennesaw State	2	–	16	.111	3	–	27	.100
† 2013 Atlantic Sun Tournament winner As of March 29, 2013; Rankings from AP Poll *ineligible for postseason play due to Div. I transition

The 2012–13 North Florida Ospreys men's basketball team represented the University of North Florida during the 2012–13 NCAA Division I men's basketball season. The Ospreys, led by fourth year head coach Matthew Driscoll, played their home games at the UNF Arena and were members of the Atlantic Sun Conference. They finished the season 13–19, 8–10 in A-Sun play to finish in a tie for seventh place. They lost in the quarterfinals of the Atlantic Sun tournament to Florida Gulf Coast.

== Roster ==
Number	Name	Position	Height	Weight	Year	Hometown
0	Cameron Naylor	Forward	6–7	175	Freshman	Jacksonville, Florida
1	Travis Wallace	Forward	6–6	230	Junior	Marietta, Georgia
2	Beau Beech	Guard	6–8	195	Freshman	Ponte Vedra Beach, Florida
3	Parker Smith	Guard	6–3	155	Senior	Gainesville, Georgia
4	Will Wilson	Guard	5–11	175	Senior	Vero Beach, Florida
5	Charles McRoy	Forward/Guard	6–6	205	Junior	Jacksonville, Florida
11	Ray Rodriguez	Guard	6–1	180	Freshman	Miami, Florida
12	Aaron Bodager	Guard	6–5	195	Freshman	Oviedo, Florida
15	Jerron Granberry	Guard/Forward	6–5	225	Senior	Miami, Florida
20	Andy Diaz	Forward	6–8	235	Senior	Miami, Florida
23	Jibril Smith	Guard	5–11	165	Freshman	Orlando, Florida
24	David Jeune	Forward	6–7	215	Senior	Okeechobee, Florida
25	Fred Landers	Forward	6–5	200	Sophomore	Fort Lauderdale, Florida
32	Demarcus Daniels	Forward	6–7	190	Freshman	Ashburn, Georgia

== Schedule ==
Date time, TV	Opponent	Result	Record	Site (attendance) city, state
Exhibition
11/01/2012*; 7:00 pm	Flagler	W 100–76		UNF Arena (1,297); Jacksonville, FL
Regular season
11/10/2012*; 7:00 pm	Edward Waters	W 79–65	1–0	UNF Arena (1,602); Jacksonville, FL
11/12/2012*; 7:30 pm, CSS	at No. 17 Memphis	L 66–81	1–1	FedExForum (15,668); Memphis, TN
11/14/2012*; 7:00 pm	at Savannah State	L 47–54	1–2	Tiger Arena (1,055); Savannah, GA
11/18/2012*; 2:00 pm, FS Kansas City	at Kansas State	L 55–74	1–3	Bramlage Coliseum (12,119); Manhattan, KS
11/21/2012*; 7:00 pm, FS South/ESPN3	at Florida State	L 67–75	1–4	Donald L. Tucker Center (6,685); Tallahassee, FL
11/27/2012*; 7:00 pm	at Bethune-Cookman	W 71–65	2–4	Moore Gymnasium (2,817); Daytona Beach, FL
11/29/2012*; 7:00 pm	Florida A&M	W 72–47	3–4	UNF Arena (1,580); Jacksonville, FL
12/01/2012*; 2:00 pm	at No. 21 Minnesota	L 59–87	3–5	Williams Arena (10,173); Minneapolis, MN
12/08/2012*; 7:00 pm, ESPN3	at Pittsburgh	L 47–89	3–6	Petersen Events Center (8,708); Pittsburgh, PA
12/17/2012*; 9:00 pm	at Colorado State; Continental Tire Las Vegas Classic	L 55–83	3–7	Moby Arena (3,556); Fort Collins, CO
12/19/2012*; 10:00 pm	at Portland; Continental Tire Las Vegas Classic	L 64–74	3–8	Chiles Center (1,003); Portland, OR
12/22/2012*; 5:30 pm	vs. Cal State Bakersfield; Continental Tire Las Vegas Classic	W 80–70	4–8	Orleans Arena (N/A); Paradise, NV
12/23/2012*; 6:15 pm	vs. Georgia Southern; Continental Tire Las Vegas Classic	W 74–46	5–8	Orleans Arena (350); Paradise, NV
12/31/2012; 4:30 pm	Lipscomb	W 84–70	6–8 (1–0)	UNF Arena (976); Jacksonville, FL
01/02/2013; 7:30 pm, ESPN3	Northern Kentucky	L 52–65	6–9 (1–1)	UNF Arena (852); Jacksonville, FL
01/05/2013; 3:15 pm	at Stetson	W 90–74	7–9 (2–1)	Edmunds Center (1,004); DeLand, FL
01/07/2013; 7:30 pm	at Florida Gulf Coast	L 73–75	7–10 (2–2)	Alico Arena (2,231); Fort Myers, FL
01/10/2013; 7:00 pm	Mercer	L 47–66	7–11 (2–3)	UNF Arena (1,753); Jacksonville, FL
01/12/2013; 4:30 pm	Kennesaw State	W 81–72	8–11 (3–3)	UNF Arena (1,018); Jacksonville, FL
01/18/2013; 7:00 pm, CSS/ESPN3	Jacksonville	L 68–77	8–12 (3–4)	UNF Arena (4,018); Jacksonville, FL
01/24/2013; 7:00 pm, ESPN3	at USC Upstate	L 57–63	8–13 (3–5)	G. B. Hodge Center (688); Spartanburg, SC
01/26/2013; 4:00 pm	at East Tennessee State	L 75–89	8–14 (3–6)	ETSU/MSHA Athletic Center (2,795); Johnson City, TN
01/31/2013; 7:00 pm	Florida Gulf Coast	L 75–89	8–15 (3–7)	UNF Arena (1,358); Jacksonville, FL
02/02/2013; 4:30 pm	Stetson	W 64–59	9–15 (4–7)	UNF Arena (1,589); Jacksonville, FL
02/07/2013; 7:00 pm	at Kennesaw State	W 60–52	10–15 (5–7)	KSU Convocation Center (2,148); Kennesaw, GA
02/09/2013; 4:30 pm	at Mercer	L 44–64	10–16 (5–8)	Hawkins Arena (3,207); Macon, GA
02/15/2013; 7:00 pm, CSS/ESPN3	at Jacksonville	L 68–70	10–17 (5–9)	Veterans Memorial Arena (4,637); Jacksonville, FL
02/21/2013; 7:00 pm	East Tennessee State	W 77–64	11–17 (6–9)	UNF Arena (1,604); Jacksonville, FL
02/23/2013; 4:30 pm	USC Upstate	W 77–53	12–17 (7–9)	UNF Arena (1,651); Jacksonville, FL
02/28/2013; 7:30 pm	at Northern Kentucky	L 45–72	12–18 (7–10)	Bank of Kentucky Center (3,356); Highland Heights, KY
03/02/2013; 9:15 pm	at Lipscomb	W 85–78	13–18 (8–10)	Allen Arena (2,674); Nashville, TN
2013 Atlantic Sun men's basketball tournament
03/06/2013; 2:30 pm, CSS/ESPN3	vs. Florida Gulf Coast; Quarterfinals	L 63–73	13–19	Hawkins Arena (683); Macon, GA
*Non-conference game. ^{#}Rankings from AP Poll. (#) Tournament seedings in parentheses. All times are in Eastern Time.
