= 2012–13 Florida Gulf Coast Eagles men's basketball team =

American college basketball season

2012–13 Florida Gulf Coast Eagles men's basketball
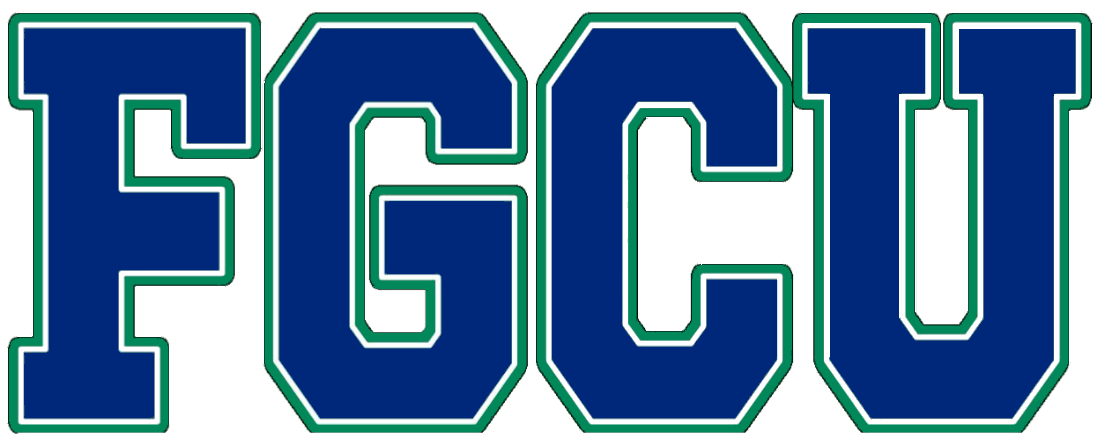

Atlantic Sun tournament champions

NCAA tournament, Sweet Sixteen
- Conference: Atlantic Sun Conference

Ranking
- Coaches: No. 25
- Record: 26–11 (13–5 A-Sun)
- Head coach: Andy Enfield (2nd season)
- Assistant coaches: Kevin Norris; Marty Richter; Michael Fly
- Home arena: Alico Arena

2012–13 Atlantic Sun men's basketball standings
	Conf.				Overall
Team	W		L	PCT	W		L	PCT
Mercer	14	–	4	.778	24	–	12	.667
Florida Gulf Coast †	13	–	5	.722	26	–	11	.703
Stetson	11	–	7	.611	15	–	16	.484
USC Upstate	9	–	9	.500	16	–	17	.485
Jacksonville	9	–	9	.500	14	–	18	.438
Northern Kentucky*	9	–	9	.500	11	–	16	.407
North Florida	8	–	10	.444	13	–	19	.406
East Tennessee State	8	–	10	.444	10	–	22	.313
Lipscomb	7	–	11	.389	12	–	18	.400
Kennesaw State	2	–	16	.111	3	–	27	.100
† 2013 Atlantic Sun Tournament winner As of March 29, 2013; Rankings from AP Poll *ineligible for postseason play due to Div. I transition

The 2012–13 Florida Gulf Coast Eagles men's basketball team represented Florida Gulf Coast University during the 2012–13 NCAA Division I men's basketball season. The Eagles, led by second year head coach Andy Enfield, played their home games at Alico Arena and were members of the Atlantic Sun Conference. They finished A-Sun play with a record of 13–5 to finish in second place. In only their second year of full NCAA eligibility, the Eagles won the Atlantic Sun tournament, beating top-seeded Mercer in the championship game, to earn their first ever bid to the NCAA tournament as a No. 15 seed in the south region. Guard Sherwood Brown was named the A-Sun player of the year.

In their NCAA Tournament debut, the 15 seeded Eagles upset 2 seeded Georgetown 78–68. It was the third time in two years and seventh time overall that a 15 seed had upset a 2 seed. With a second round 81–71 win over San Diego State, they became the first 15 seed to win two games in a tournament to advance to the Sweet Sixteen. They lost in the Sweet Sixteen to Florida 62–50 to finish the season 26–11. After the season, Andy Enfield was hired by the USC Trojans to be the head coach. They won the 2013 ESPY for Best Upset. Due to its propensity for acrobatic slam dunks and alley-oops during its unlikely Cinderella run, this specific team became known as "Dunk City" after a song of the same name was posted on YouTube Black Magic and Bambi immediately following their victory over Georgetown, featuring a parody of American rapper Tyga's "Rack City" and played over highlights of the Eagles' win. The "Dunk City" nickname has since expanded to the FGCU men's basketball program as a whole.

== Roster ==
2012–13 Florida Gulf Coast Eagles men's basketball team
Players
Coaches

Pos.	#	Name	Height	Weight	Year	Hometown
G	0	Brett Comer	6 ft 3 in (1.91 m)	192 lb (87 kg)	So	Winter Park, Florida
F	1	Nate Hicks (redshirt)	6 ft 10 in (2.08 m)	215 lb (98 kg)	Jr	Panama City Beach, Florida
G	2	Bernard Thompson	6 ft 3 in (1.91 m)	166 lb (75 kg)	So	Conyers, Georgia
G	5	Christophe Varidel	6 ft 2 in (1.88 m)	170 lb (77 kg)	Jr	Versoix, Switzerland
G	11	Jamail Jones (redshirt)	6 ft 6 in (1.98 m)	215 lb (98 kg)	Jr	Atlanta, Georgia
F	12	Eric McKnight	6 ft 9 in (2.06 m)	210 lb (95 kg)	RS So	Raleigh, North Carolina
G	14	Alexander Blessig	6 ft 2 in (1.88 m)	181 lb (82 kg)	Fr	Berlin, Germany
F	15	Filip Cvjeticanin	6 ft 9 in (2.06 m)	212 lb (96 kg)	So	Zagreb, Croatia
F	20	Chase Fieler	6 ft 8 in (2.03 m)	205 lb (93 kg)	Jr	Parkersburg, West Virginia
F	21	Leonard Livingston Jr.	6 ft 10 in (2.08 m)	180 lb (82 kg)	Fr	Upper Marlboro, Maryland
F	23	Eddie Murray	6 ft 8 in (2.03 m)	205 lb (93 kg)	RS Sr	North Fort Myers, Florida
F	24	Marcus Blake (W)	6 ft 7 in (2.01 m)	195 lb (88 kg)	RS So	Miami, Florida
G	25	Sherwood Brown	6 ft 4 in (1.93 m)	200 lb (91 kg)	Sr	Orlando, Florida
G	35	Dajuan Graf	6 ft 0 in (1.83 m)	170 lb (77 kg)	Fr	Charlotte, North Carolina

Head coach

- Andy Enfield (Johns Hopkins)

Assistant coach(es)

- Kevin Norris (Miami (FL))
- Marty Richter (Simpson)
- Michael Fly (Kentucky)

Legend

- (C) Team captain
- (S) Suspended
- (I) Ineligible
- (W) Walk-on
- Injured
- Current redshirt

Roster
Last update: 2013-03-11

According to Yahoo Sports columnist Eric Adelson, "The out-of-nowhere stories [on the squad] are kind of staggering." Brown began his college career as a walk-on, and was so little-regarded in high school that he does not appear in the database of Yahoo's Rivals.com recruiting site. Starting point guard Brett Comer, who had 24 assists in the Eagles' first two NCAA games, said he had no idea how to play the position when he arrived at FGCU; at Winter Park High School, he took a back seat to future NBA player Austin Rivers. Chase Fieler, whose one-handed alley-oop dunk off a Comer pass was the signature play of the Georgetown game, also does not appear in the Rivals.com database, and did not know how to jump off two feet when he arrived at FGCU. Bernard Thompson, named A-Sun Defensive Player of the Year, was by comparison highly touted; he had offers from budding power VCU and five other mid-majors. Nonetheless, he was not nationally ranked out of high school.

== Schedule ==
Date time, TV	Rank^{#}	Opponent^{#}	Result	Record	Site (attendance) city, state
Non-conference regular season
11/09/2012*; 7:30 pm		at VCU; Battle 4 Atlantis	L 57–80	0–1	Stuart C. Siegel Center (7,693); Richmond, VA
11/13/2012*; 7:05 pm		Miami (FL)	W 63–51	1–1	Alico Arena (4,552); Fort Myers, FL
11/15/2012*; 7:05 pm		Ave Maria	W 86–54	2–1	Alico Arena (1,113); Fort Myers, FL
11/18/2012*; 8:00 pm, ESPNU		at No. 9 Duke; Battle 4 Atlantis	L 67–88	2–2	Cameron Indoor Stadium (9,314); Durham, NC
11/21/2012*; 7:05 pm		Alcorn State; Battle 4 Atlantis	W 50–48	3–2	Alico Arena (1,370); Fort Myers, FL
11/22/2012*; 7:00 pm		Toledo; Battle 4 Atlantis	W 72–66	4–2	Alico Arena (676); Fort Myers, FL
11/24/2012*; 7:30 pm		at St. John's	L 68–79	4–3	Carnesecca Arena (4,003); Queens, New York
11/28/2012*; 8:00 pm		at Samford	W 86–62	5–3	Pete Hanna Center (1,087); Homewood, AL
12/01/2012*; 7:05 pm		Loyola (MD)	W 65–50	6–3	Alico Arena (2,141); Fort Myers, FL
12/04/2012*; 8:00 pm, Cyclones.tv		at Iowa State	L 72–83	6–4	Hilton Coliseum (12,692); Ames, IA
12/13/2012*; 7:05 pm		FIU	W 76–73	7–4	Alico Arena (1,803); Fort Myers, FL
12/18/2012*; 7:05 pm		Southeastern	W 86–60	8–4	Alico Arena (1,162); Fort Myers, FL
12/22/2012*; 2:00 pm		at Maine	L 78–84	8–5	Alfond Arena (980); Orono, ME
Atlantic Sun regular season
12/31/2012; 5:00 pm		at Kennesaw State	W 68–59	9–5 (1–0)	KSU Convocation Center (821); Kennesaw, GA
01/02/2013; 7:30 pm		at Mercer	L 70–77 ^{OT}	9–6 (1–1)	Hawkins Arena (2,742); Macon, GA
01/05/2013; 2:00 pm		Jacksonville	W 78–55	10–6 (2–1)	Alico Arena (1,704); Fort Myers, FL
01/07/2013; 7:30 pm		North Florida	W 75–73	11–6 (3–1)	Alico Arena (2,231); Fort Myers, FL
01/10/2013; 7:00 pm		at USC Upstate	W 72–71 ^{OT}	12–6 (4–1)	G. B. Hodge Center (759); Spartanburg, SC
01/12/2013; 4:00 pm		at East Tennessee State	L 75–85	12–7 (4–2)	ETSU/MSHA Athletic Center (2,446); Johnson City, TN
01/17/2013; 7:05 pm		Lipscomb	L 78–87 ^{OT}	12–8 (4–3)	Alico Arena (1,960); Fort Myers, FL
01/19/2013; 5:15 pm		Northern Kentucky	W 73–54	13–8 (5–3)	Alico Arena (2,189); Fort Myers, FL
01/25/2013; 7:05 pm, ESPN3		Stetson	W 96–65	14–8 (6–3)	Alico Arena (3,002); Fort Myers, FL
01/31/2013; 7:00 pm		at North Florida	W 89–75	15–8 (7–3)	UNF Arena (1,358); Jacksonville, FL
02/02/2013; 3:15 pm		at Jacksonville	W 81–78	16–8 (8–3)	Swisher Gymnasium (899); Jacksonville, FL
02/07/2013; 7:00 pm		East Tennessee State	W 67–43	17–8 (9–3)	Alico Arena (2,832); Fort Myers, FL
02/09/2013; 5:15 pm, ESPN3		USC Upstate	W 74–49	18–8 (10–3)	Alico Arena (3,621); Fort Myers, FL
02/14/2013; 7:00 pm		at Northern Kentucky	W 60–53	19–8 (11–3)	The Bank of Kentucky Center (3,386); Highland Heights, KY
02/16/2013; 7:30 pm, ESPN3		at Lipscomb	L 74–84	19–9 (11–4)	Allen Arena (1,754); Nashville, TN
02/22/2013; 7:00 pm, ESPN3		at Stetson	L 71–80	19–10 (11–5)	Edmunds Center (1,342); DeLand, FL
02/28/2013; 7:30 pm		Mercer	W 60–57	20–10 (12–5)	Alico Arena (3,586); Fort Myers, FL
03/02/2013; 5:15 pm		Kennesaw State	W 67–49	21–10 (13–5)	Alico Arena (2,574); Fort Myers, FL
Atlantic Sun tournament
03/06/2013; 2:30 pm, CSS/ESPN3	(2)	vs. (7) North Florida; Quarterfinal	W 73–63	22–10	Hawkins Arena (683); Macon, GA
03/08/2013; 8:00 pm, CSS/ESPN3	(2)	vs. (3) Stetson; Semifinal	W 72–58	23–10	Hawkins Arena (3,527); Macon, GA
03/09/2013; 12:00 pm, ESPN2	(2)	at (1) Mercer; Championship Game	W 88–75	24–10	Hawkins Arena (3,494); Macon, GA
NCAA tournament
03/22/2013*; 6:50 pm, TBS	(15 S)	vs. (2 S) No. 8 Georgetown; First round	W 78–68	25–10	Wells Fargo Center (20,125); Philadelphia, PA
03/24/2013*; 7:10 pm, TBS	(15 S)	vs. (7 S) San Diego State; Second round	W 81–71	26–10	Wells Fargo Center (20,125); Philadelphia, PA
03/29/2013*; 10:38 pm, TBS	(15 S)	vs. (3 S) No. 14 Florida; Sweet Sixteen	L 50–62	26–11	Cowboys Stadium (40,639); Arlington, TX
*Non-conference game. ^{#}Rankings from AP Poll. (#) Tournament seedings in parentheses. All times are in Eastern Time.
