= 2012–13 Mercer Bears men's basketball team =

American college basketball season

2012–13 Mercer Bears men's basketball

Atlantic Sun regular season champions

NIT, Second round
- Conference: Atlantic Sun Conference
- Record: 24–12 (14–4 A-Sun)
- Head coach: Bob Hoffman (5th season)
- Assistant coaches: Spencer Wright; Doug Esleeck; Jake Nelp
- Home arena: Hawkins Arena

2012–13 Atlantic Sun men's basketball standings
| | Conf. | | | | Overall |
| Team | W | | L | PCT | W | | L | PCT |
|---|---|---|---|---|---|---|---|---|
| Mercer | 14 | – | 4 | .778 | 24 | – | 12 | .667 |
| Florida Gulf Coast † | 13 | – | 5 | .722 | 26 | – | 11 | .703 |
| Stetson | 11 | – | 7 | .611 | 15 | – | 16 | .484 |
| USC Upstate | 9 | – | 9 | .500 | 16 | – | 17 | .485 |
| Jacksonville | 9 | – | 9 | .500 | 14 | – | 18 | .438 |
| Northern Kentucky* | 9 | – | 9 | .500 | 11 | – | 16 | .407 |
| North Florida | 8 | – | 10 | .444 | 13 | – | 19 | .406 |
| East Tennessee State | 8 | – | 10 | .444 | 10 | – | 22 | .313 |
| Lipscomb | 7 | – | 11 | .389 | 12 | – | 18 | .400 |
| Kennesaw State | 2 | – | 16 | .111 | 3 | – | 27 | .100 |
† 2013 Atlantic Sun Tournament winner As of March 29, 2013; Rankings from AP Poll *ineligible for postseason play due to Div. I transition

The 2012–13 Mercer Bears men's basketball team represented Mercer University during the 2012–13 NCAA Division I men's basketball season. The Bears, led by fifth year head coach Bob Hoffman, played their home games at Hawkins Arena on the university's Macon, Georgia campus and were members of the Atlantic Sun Conference. They finished the season 24–12, 14–4 in A-Sun play to win the regular season conference championship. They advanced to the championship game of the Atlantic Sun tournament where they lost to Florida Gulf Coast. As a regular season conference champions who failed to win their conference tournament, they received an automatic bid to the 2013 NIT where they defeated Tennessee in the first round before losing in the second round to BYU.

== Roster ==
| Number | Name | Position | Height | Weight | Year | Hometown |
|---|---|---|---|---|---|---|
| 2 | Travis Smith | Guard | 6–3 | 185 | Senior | Johns Island, South Carolina |
| 3 | Kevin Canevari | Guard | 5–11 | 165 | Junior | Charlotte, North Carolina |
| 5 | Bud Thomas | Forward | 6–6 | 200 | Junior | Highlands Ranch, Colorado |
| 14 | T.J. Hallice | Forward | 6–9 | 205 | Sophomore | Weddington, North Carolina |
| 15 | Anthony White, Jr. | Guard | 6–2 | | Junior | Indianapolis, Indiana |
| 20 | Jakob Gollon | Forward | 6–6 | 200 | Junior | Stevens Point, Wisconsin |
| 21 | Langston Hall | Guard | 6–4 | 180 | Junior | Atlanta, Georgia |
| 22 | Darious Moten | Forward | 6–6 | 195 | Sophomore | Bowdon, Georgia |
| 23 | Chris Smith | Guard | 6–1 | 170 | Senior | Dublin, Georgia |
| 25 | Lawrence Brown | Guard | 6–5 | | Freshman | Kansas City, Missouri |
| 34 | Jibri Bryan | Guard | 6–3 | 180 | Sophomore | Savannah, Georgia |
| 44 | Marquisse Jackson | Forward | 6–5 | 183 | Senior | Bartlesville, Oklahoma |
| 45 | Monty Brown | Center | 6–11 | 250 | Junior | Liberty Mounds, Oklahoma |
| 52 | Daniel Coursey | Forward | 6–10 | 220 | Junior | Savannah, Georgia |

== Schedule ==
| Date time, TV | Rank^{#} | Opponent^{#} | Result | Record | Site (attendance) city, state |
Regular season
| 11/10/2012*; 4:00 pm | | Sewanee | W 65–36 | 1–0 | Hawkins Arena (3,497); Macon, GA |
| 11/12/2012*; 7:00 pm | | Oglethorpe | W 70–25 | 2–0 | Hawkins Arena (1,572); Macon, GA |
| 11/16/2012*; 2:30 pm, CBSSN | | vs. George Mason; Paradise Jam | L 49–52 | 2–1 | Sports and Fitness Center (N/A); Saint Thomas, USVI |
| 11/17/2012*; 2:30 pm | | vs. UIC; Paradise Jam | L 36–62 | 2–2 | Sports and Fitness Center (N/A); Saint Thomas, USVI |
| 11/19/2012*; 2:30 pm | | vs. Wake Forest; Paradise Jam | L 71–74 | 2–3 | Sports and Fitness Center (N/A); Saint Thomas, USVI |
| 11/25/2012*; 7:00 pm | | Furman | W 73–46 | 3–3 | Hawkins Arena (2,272); Macon, GA |
| 11/28/2012*; 9:00 pm | | at No. 25 New Mexico | L 58–76 | 3–4 | The Pit (13,561); Albuquerque, NM |
| 12/02/2012*; 2:00 pm, ESPN3 | | at Florida State | W 61–56 | 4–4 | Donald L. Tucker Center (6,088); Tallahassee, FL |
| 12/05/2012*; 7:00 pm | | at Denver | L 40–69 | 4–5 | Magness Arena (1,341); Denver, CO |
| 12/08/2012*; 7:00 pm | | Alabama A&M | W 65–46 | 5–5 | Hawkins Arena (2,261); Macon, GA |
| 12/16/2012*; 3:00 pm | | at Chattanooga | W 63–53 | 6–5 | McKenzie Arena (2,408); Chattanooga, TN |
| 12/18/2012*; 11:30 am | | at Georgia | L 49–58 | 6–6 | Stegeman Coliseum (8,650); Athens, GA |
| 12/22/2012*; 2:00 pm, ESPN3 | | at Alabama | W 66–59 | 7–6 | Coleman Coliseum (10,243); Tuscaloosa, AL |
| 12/31/2012; 4:30 pm | | Stetson | W 70–64 | 8–6 (1–0) | Hawkins Arena (2,427); Macon, GA |
| 01/02/2013; 7:30 pm | | Florida Gulf Coast | W 77–70 ^{OT} | 9–6 (2–0) | Hawkins Arena (2,742); Macon, GA |
| 01/05/2013; 2:30 pm, ESPN3 | | at Kennesaw State | L 75–83 | 9–7 (2–1) | KSU Convocation Center (1,981); Kennesaw, GA |
| 01/10/2013; 7:00 pm | | at North Florida | W 66–47 | 10–7 (3–1) | UNF Arena (1,753); Jacksonville, FL |
| 01/12/2013; 3:30 pm | | at Jacksonville | L 47–49 | 10–8 (3–2) | Jacksonville Veterans Memorial Arena (1,272); Jacksonville, FL |
| 01/17/2013; 7:00 pm, ESPN3 | | East Tennessee State | W 78–59 | 11–8 (4–2) | Hawkins Arena (2,672); Macon, GA |
| 01/19/2013; 4:30 pm | | USC Upstate | W 82–74 | 12–8 (5–2) | Hawkins Arena (2,734); Macon, GA |
| 01/24/2013; 7:00 pm | | at Northern Kentucky | L 46–63 | 12–9 (5–3) | The Bank of Kentucky Center (3,086); Highland Heights, KY |
| 01/26/2013; 7:30 pm, ESPN3 | | at Lipscomb | W 71–65 | 13–9 (6–3) | Allen Arena (2,926); Nashville, TN |
| 02/01/2013; 7:00 pm, ESPN3 | | at Kennesaw State | W 66–42 | 14–9 (7–3) | KSU Convocation Center (3,072); Kennesaw, GA |
| 02/07/2013; 7:00 pm | | Jacksonville | W 67–64 ^{OT} | 15–9 (8–3) | Hawkins Arena (2,372); Macon, GA |
| 02/09/2013; 4:30 pm | | North Florida | W 64–44 | 16–9 (9–3) | Hawkins Arena (3,207); Macon, GA |
| 02/14/2013; 9:00 pm, ESPN3 | | at USC Upstate | W 70–59 | 17–9 (10–3) | G. B. Hodge Center (611); Spartanburg, SC |
| 02/16/2013; 4:00 pm | | at East Tennessee State | W 71–54 | 18–9 (11–3) | ETSU/MSHA Athletic Center (2,127); Johnson City, TN |
| 02/21/2013; 7:00 pm | | Lipscomb | W 83–58 | 19–9 (12–3) | Hawkins Arena (2,727); Macon, GA |
| 02/23/2013; 4:30 pm | | Northern Kentucky | W 63–46 | 20–9 (13–3) | Hawkins Arena (3,527); Macon, GA |
| 02/28/2013; 7:30 pm | | at Florida Gulf Coast | L 57–60 | 20–10 (13–4) | Alico Arena (3,586); Fort Myers, FL |
| 03/02/2013; 3:15 pm | | at Stetson | W 77–65 | 21–10 (14–4) | Edmunds Center (924); DeLand, FL |
2013 Atlantic Sun tournament
| 03/06/2013; 8:30 pm, CSS/ESPN3 | | Lipscomb; Quarterfinals | W 82–48 | 22–10 | Hawkins Arena (3,527); Macon, GA |
| 03/08/2013; 5:30 pm, CSS | | USC Upstate; Semifinals | W 72–64 | 23–10 | Hawkins Arena (3,527); Macon, GA |
| 03/09/2013; 12:00 pm, ESPN2 | | Florida Gulf Coast; Championship Game | L 75–88 | 23–11 | Hawkins Arena (3,494); Macon, GA |
2013 NIT
| 03/20/2013*; 8:00 pm, ESPNU | (7) | at (2) Tennessee; First round | W 75–67 | 24–11 | Thompson–Boling Arena (4,468); Knoxville, TN |
| 03/25/2013*; 9:00 pm, ESPNEWS/ESPN3 | (7) | at (3) BYU; Second round | L 71–90 | 24–12 | Marriott Center (12,929); Provo, UT |
*Non-conference game. ^{#}Rankings from AP Poll. (#) Tournament seedings in parentheses. All times are in Eastern Time.
