= Mini Dome =

Mini Dome can refer to many dome stadiums or covered fields, including:

- ETSU/Mountain States Health Alliance Athletic Center in Johnson City, Tennessee
- Holt Arena in Idaho
