= Andy Enfield =

American basketball coach (born 1969)

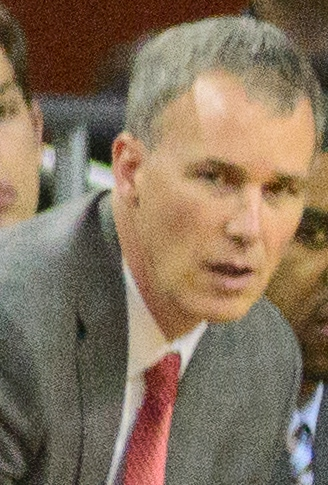
- Enfield in 2014.

Current position
- Title: Head coach
- Team: SMU
- Conference: ACC
- Record: 48–25 (.658)

Biographical details
- Born: June 8, 1969 (age 57); Shippensburg, Pennsylvania, U.S.

Playing career
- 1987–1991: Johns Hopkins

Coaching career (HC unless noted)
- 1994–1996: Milwaukee Bucks (assistant)
- 1998–2000: Boston Celtics (assistant)
- 2006–2011: Florida State (assistant)
- 2011–2013: Florida Gulf Coast
- 2013–2024: USC
- 2024–present: SMU

Head coaching record
- Overall: 309–200 (.607)
- Tournaments: 7–7 (NCAA Division I); 1–1 (NIT)

Accomplishments and honors

Championships
- ASUN tournament (2013)

Awards
- NABC third-team All-American (1991); 2× First-team All-UAA (1990, 1991); 2× Academic All-America (1990, 1991); Pac-12 Coach of the Year (2021)

Andrew William Enfield (born June 8, 1969) is an American basketball coach who is the head men's basketball coach at Southern Methodist University. He came to national prominence as head coach at Florida Gulf Coast when it made an unexpected run to the Sweet 16 round of the 2013 NCAA tournament as a No. 15 seed.

Originally from Shippensburg, Pennsylvania, Enfield played college basketball at Johns Hopkins University as a shooting guard and graduated with 18 school records. He held the all-time NCAA record for free throw shooting percentage. A basketball coach since 1994, Enfield began his career as an assistant coach for the NBA's Milwaukee Bucks and Boston Celtics, after which he went on a brief hiatus from coaching to work as a business executive. In 2006, Enfield returned to coaching as an assistant at Florida State. Enfield got his first head-coaching position at Florida Gulf Coast in 2011.

After two seasons at Florida Gulf Coast, Enfield became the head coach of the USC Trojans in 2013. Enfield led USC to six postseason appearances; five in the NCAA Tournament (2016, 2017, 2021, 2022, and 2023) and once in the NIT (2018); the Trojans made it past the Second Round once with Enfield.

On April 1, 2024, Enfield was named the head coach at SMU, ahead of the program's move to the ACC, beginning with the 2024–25 season.

== Early life and education ==
The son of local teachers Bill and Barbara Enfield, Andrew William Enfield graduated as class valedictorian from Shippensburg High School in Shippensburg, Pennsylvania. He attended Johns Hopkins University, where he was the first recruit of longtime head basketball coach Bill Nelson. Enfield was a shooting guard and currently holds 18 school records, such as career points (2,025), single-season points (610), career scoring average (18.8), career field goals (680), career three-pointers (234), career three-point percentage (.470), career free throws (431), single-season free-throw percentage (95.3), and career minutes (3,542). He also set the NCAA record for career free throw percentage (.925) (since broken by Blake Ahearn) and was named a Division III Academic All-American in 1990 and 1991 and NABC All-American in 1991. Enfield graduated from JHU with a bachelor's degree in economics and earned an NCAA Postgraduate Scholarship. He earned an MBA from the University of Maryland.

== Career ==
=== Career background ===
To supplement his income, Enfield and former Johns Hopkins lacrosse coach Dave Pietramala operated lacrosse and basketball camps, which focused on shooting. This evolved into consulting, where Enfield advertised himself as "the shot doctor." He moved to New York City and formed his first company which sold videos teaching basketball shooting techniques.

In 2000, Enfield invested in and was hired as a vice president of finance at TractManager, a healthcare software startup. The company's founder/CEO, Thomas A. Rizk, said he "saw some genius in Andy in everything he did". Enfield remained with the company for more than five years and, as of March 2013, still owns stock in it; Rizk stated the company is worth significantly more than the $100 million figure he claimed was erroneously reported by Sports Illustrated.

=== Coaching career ===
==== Milwaukee Bucks, Boston Celtics, and Florida State ====
Beginning in 1994, Enfield's work as a shooting consultant led to jobs as a shooting coach for two years each with the Milwaukee Bucks and then the Boston Celtics. After leaving TractManager, he was an assistant coach for five years to Leonard Hamilton with the Florida State Seminoles, which earned three trips to the NCAA tournament.

==== Florida Gulf Coast University ====
In 2011, Enfield was hired as the second head coach of Florida Gulf Coast University. In his first season, he led the team to the finals of the Atlantic Sun Conference tournament, losing to regular-season champion Belmont. In 2012–13, FGCU first attracted attention by beating Miami and finishing in second place as the second seed in the Atlantic Sun tournament. After defeating regular season champion Mercer in the championship game, the Eagles earned a No. 15 seed in the South Region of the NCAA tournament, where they upset No. 2 seed Georgetown in the first round and No. 7 seed San Diego State in the second round, making them the first No. 15 seed to reach the regional semifinals (popularly known as the "Sweet 16"). Their run ended after being defeated 62–50 by No. 3 Florida.

==== USC ====
On April 1, 2013, the University of Southern California hired Enfield as its head basketball coach. He replaced Bob Cantu, who took over in the middle of the 2012–13 season on an interim basis from Kevin O'Neill, who was fired. At first, the Trojans could not repeat the success of Enfield's previous team, finishing last in the Pac-12 in Enfield's first two seasons, but they made the NCAA tournament in his third season. In his fourth season, Enfield and the Trojans got out to a 14–0 start before dropping their conference opener to Oregon. Enfield recorded his 100th win as a head coach in a victory over conference opponent Stanford.

==== SMU ====
On April 1, 2024, Enfield was hired as the head men's basketball coach at SMU after 11 seasons at USC.

== Personal life ==
Enfield's wife is former model Amanda Marcum. They have two daughters, Aila and Lily, and a son, Marcum. Enfield was inducted into Johns Hopkins University's Athletic Hall of Fame in 2001.

== Head coaching record ==
Record table
| Season | Team | Overall | Conference | Standing | Postseason |
|---|---|---|---|---|---|
Florida Gulf Coast Eagles (Atlantic Sun Conference) (2011–2013)
| 2011–12 | Florida Gulf Coast | 15–17 | 8–10 | T–6th | |
| 2012–13 | Florida Gulf Coast | 26–11 | 13–5 | 2nd | NCAA Division I Sweet 16 |
| Florida Gulf Coast: | | 41–28 (.594) | 21–15 (.583) | | |
USC Trojans (Pac-12 Conference) (2013–2024)
| 2013–14 | USC | 11–21 | 2–16 | 12th | |
| 2014–15 | USC | 12–20 | 3–15 | 12th | |
| 2015–16 | USC | 21–13 | 9–9 | 6th | NCAA Division I Round of 64 |
| 2016–17 | USC | 26–10 | 10–8 | T–5th | NCAA Division I Round of 32 |
| 2017–18 | USC | 24–12 | 12–6 | 2nd | NIT Second Round |
| 2018–19 | USC | 16–17 | 8–10 | T–8th | |
| 2019–20 | USC | 22–9 | 11–7 | T–3rd | Postseason cancelled due to COVID-19 |
| 2020–21 | USC | 25–8 | 15–5 | 2nd | NCAA Division I Elite Eight |
| 2021–22 | USC | 26–8 | 14–6 | 3rd | NCAA Division I Round of 64 |
| 2022–23 | USC | 22–11 | 14–6 | T–2nd | NCAA Division I Round of 64 |
| 2023–24 | USC | 15–18 | 8–12 | T–9th | |
| USC: | | 220–147 (.599) | 106–100 (.515) | | |
SMU Mustangs (Atlantic Coast Conference) (2024–present)
| 2024–25 | SMU | 24–11 | 13–7 | T–4th | NIT Second Round |
| 2025–26 | SMU | 20–14 | 8–10 | T–11th | NCAA Division I First Four |
| 2026–27 | SMU | 4–0 | 0–0 | | |
| SMU: | | 48–25 (.658) | 21–17 (.553) | | |
| Total: | | 309–200 (.607) | | | |
National champion Postseason invitational champion Conference regular season champion Conference regular season and conference tournament champion Division regular season champion Division regular season and conference tournament champion Conference tournament champion
