= 2012–13 VCU Rams men's basketball team =

American college basketball season

2012–13 VCU Rams men's basketball
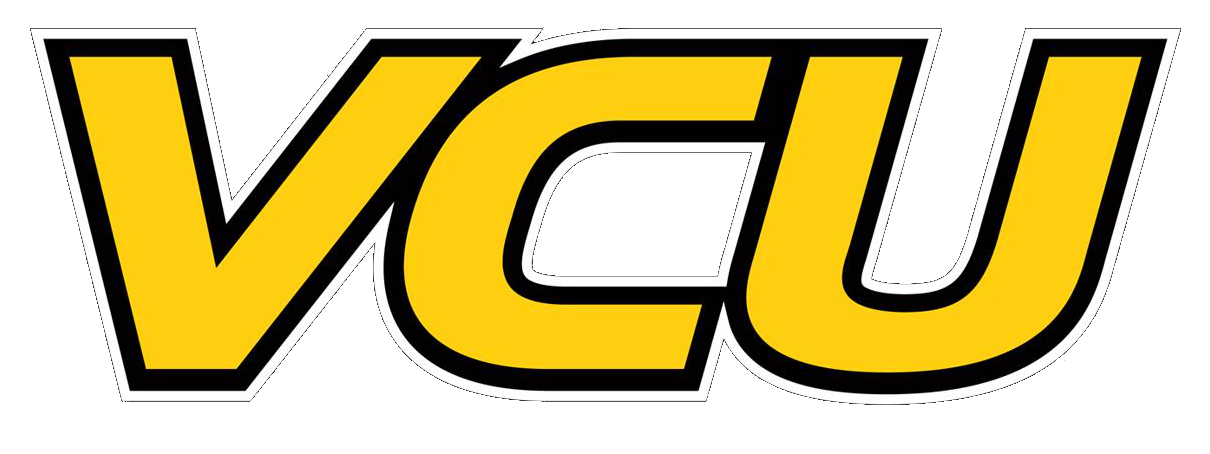

NCAA tournament, Round of 32
- Conference: Atlantic 10 Conference

Ranking
- Coaches: No. 23
- Record: 27–9 (12–4 A10)
- Head coach: Shaka Smart (4th season)
- Assistant coaches: Mike Rhoades; Jeremy Ballard; Will Wade
- Home arena: Stuart C. Siegel Center

2012–13 Atlantic 10 men's basketball standings
	Conf.				Overall
Team	W		L	PCT	W		L	PCT
No. 16 Saint Louis †	13	–	3	.813	28	–	7	.800
No. 25 VCU	12	–	4	.750	27	–	9	.750
Butler	11	–	5	.688	27	–	9	.750
La Salle	11	–	5	.688	24	–	10	.706
Temple	11	–	5	.688	24	–	10	.706
UMass	9	–	7	.563	21	–	12	.636
Xavier	9	–	7	.563	17	–	14	.548
Charlotte	8	–	8	.500	21	–	12	.636
Saint Joseph's	8	–	8	.500	18	–	14	.563
Richmond	8	–	8	.500	19	–	15	.559
Dayton	7	–	9	.438	17	–	14	.548
St. Bonaventure	7	–	9	.438	14	–	15	.483
George Washington	7	–	9	.438	13	–	17	.433
Rhode Island	3	–	13	.188	8	–	21	.276
Fordham	3	–	13	.188	7	–	24	.226
Duquesne	1	–	15	.063	8	–	22	.267
† 2013 Atlantic 10 Tournament winner As of March 28, 2013; Rankings from AP Poll

The 2012–13 VCU Rams men's basketball team represented Virginia Commonwealth University during the 2012–13 NCAA Division I men's basketball season. It was the 45th season of the university fielding a men's basketball program. Led by fourth-year head coach Shaka Smart, they played their home games at the Stuart C. Siegel Center. This was the Rams inaugural season in the Atlantic 10 Conference (A10), after spending the past 17 years in the Colonial Athletic Association (CAA). They finished the season 27–9, 12–4 in A10 play to finish in second place. They advanced to the championship game of the 2013 Atlantic 10 tournament where they lost to Saint Louis. They received an at-large bid to the 2013 NCAA tournament, their third straight NCAA Tournament appearance, where they defeated Akron in the first round before losing in the third round to Michigan.

== Preseason ==
VCU was predicted to finish third in the Atlantic 10 preseason polls, which was released October 4, 2012 in Brooklyn, New York. Junior forward Juvonte Reddic was selected to the preseason Atlantic 10 third team, sophomore guard Brianté Weber was selected to the preseason Atlantic 10 All-Defensive team and freshman guard Melvin Johnson was selected to the preseason Atlantic 10 All-Rookie team.

== 2012–13 incoming team members ==
=== 2012–13 team recruits ===
College recruiting information
Name	Hometown	School	Height	Weight	Commit date
Melvin Johnson; SG	Bronx, N.Y.	St.Benedict's Prep	6 ft 3 in (1.91 m)	175 lb (79 kg)	Jul 20, 2012
Melvin Johnson; SG	Recruit ratings: Scout: Rivals: (92)				
Jordan Burgess; SF	Midlothian, VA	Benedictine High School	6 ft 5 in (1.96 m)	195 lb (88 kg)	Jun 9, 2011
Jordan Burgess; SF	Recruit ratings: Scout: Rivals: (92)				
Justin Tuoyo; C	Lovejoy, GA	Lovejoy High School	6 ft 9 in (2.06 m)	210 lb (95 kg)	May 13, 2011
Justin Tuoyo; C	Recruit ratings: Scout: Rivals: (86)				
Mo Alie-Cox; PF	Lorton, VA	Middleburg Academy	6 ft 5 in (1.96 m)	240 lb (110 kg)	May 26, 2011
Mo Alie-Cox; PF	Recruit ratings: Scout: Rivals: (86)				
Overall recruit ranking:
Note: In many cases, Scout, Rivals, 247Sports, On3, and ESPN may conflict in their listings of height and weight.; In these cases, the average was taken. ESPN grades are on a 100-point scale.; Sources: "VCU 2012 Basketball Commitments". Rivals.; "2012 VCU Basketball Commits". Scout.; "VCU 2012 Player Commits". ESPN.; "Scout.com Team Recruiting Rankings". Scout.; "2012 Team Ranking". Rivals.

== Roster ==
2012–13 VCU Rams men's basketball team
Players
Coaches

Pos.	#	Name	Height	Weight	Year	Hometown
G	2	Brianté Weber	6 ft 2 in (1.88 m)	165 lb (75 kg)	So	Chesapeake, VA
G	5	Teddy Okereafor	6 ft 3 in (1.91 m)	195 lb (88 kg)	So	London, ENG
G	10	Darius Theus	6 ft 3 in (1.91 m)	200 lb (91 kg)	Sr	Portsmouth, VA
G	11	Rob Brandenberg	6 ft 2 in (1.88 m)	180 lb (82 kg)	Jr	Gahanna, OH
F	12	Mo Alie-Cox (I)	6 ft 6 in (1.98 m)	260 lb (118 kg)	Fr	Middleburg, VA
F	15	Juvonte Reddic	6 ft 9 in (2.06 m)	235 lb (107 kg)	Jr	Winston-Salem, NC
G	20	Jordan Burgess (I)	6 ft 4 in (1.93 m)	210 lb (95 kg)	Fr	Midlothian, VA
G	21	Treveon Graham	6 ft 5 in (1.96 m)	215 lb (98 kg)	So	Washington, D.C.
F	23	Jarred Guest	6 ft 8 in (2.03 m)	210 lb (95 kg)	So	Columbia, SC
G	30	Troy Daniels	6 ft 4 in (1.93 m)	200 lb (91 kg)	Sr	Roanoke, VA
F	31	Justin Tuoyo	6 ft 9 in (2.06 m)	220 lb (100 kg)	Fr	Hampton, VA
G	32	Melvin Johnson	6 ft 3 in (1.91 m)	195 lb (88 kg)	Fr	Bronx, NY
C	33	D. J. Haley	7 ft 0 in (2.13 m)	250 lb (113 kg)	Jr	Palmdale, CA
F	34	David Hinton	6 ft 9 in (2.06 m)	235 lb (107 kg)	Sr	Winston-Salem, NC

Head coach

- Shaka Smart (Kenyon)

Assistant coach(es)

- Mike Rhoades (Lebanon Valley)
- Will Wade (Clemson)
- Jeremy Ballard (Colgate)

Legend

- (C) Team captain
- (S) Suspended
- (I) Ineligible
- (W) Walk-on
- Injured
- Current redshirt

Roster
Last update: 24 October 2012

=== Depth chart ===
Pos.	Starting 5	Bench 1	Bench 2
C	D.J. Haley
PF	Juvonte Reddic	Jarred Guest	David Hinton
SF	Treveon Graham	Justin Tuoyo
SG	Troy Daniels	Brianté Weber	Rob Brandenberg
PG	Darius Theus	Teddy Okereafor	Melvin Johnson

== Offseason ==
Incoming Freshman Jordan Burgess and Mo Alie-Cox were ruled ineligible to play in the 2012–13 season by NCAA because they were deemed to be partial qualifiers. Burgess was allowed to practice with the team while Alie-Cox was not. Both were able to remain on scholarship and will be eligible to play in 2013–14 as sophomores. The school never gave specifics as to why they were ruled ineligible by the NCAA. Guard Reco McCarver transferred from VCU to Campbell University. Heath Houston also left the team due to knee injuries.

== Rankings ==
Poll	Pre	Wk 1	Wk 2	Wk 3	Wk 4	Wk 5	Wk 6	Wk 7	Wk 8	Wk 9	Wk 10	Wk 11	Wk 12	Wk 13	Wk 14	Wk 15	Wk 16	Wk 17	Wk 18	Wk 19	Final
AP	RV	RV		RV		RV	RV	RV	RV	RV	22	19	RV	RV	RV	RV	24	RV	21	25	
Coaches'	RV	RV	RV	RV	RV	RV	RV	RV	RV	24	19	16	RV	RV	RV	RV	24	25	19	22	23

RV-Receiving votes

== Schedule ==
Date time, TV	Rank^{#}	Opponent^{#}	Result	Record	Site (attendance) city, state
Exhibition
November 1*; 7:30 pm		Virginia Union	W 94–44	0–0	Stuart C. Siegel Center; Richmond, VA
Non-conference regular season
November 9*; 7:30 pm		Florida Gulf Coast	W 80–57	1–0	Stuart C. Siegel Center (7,693); Richmond, VA
November 13*; 7:30 pm, ESPNU		Wichita State	L 51–53	1–1	Stuart C. Siegel Center (7,693); Richmond, VA
November 17*; 2:00 pm		at Winthrop	W 90–54	2–1	Winthrop Coliseum (1,726); Rock Hill, SC
November 22*; 7:00 pm, NBCSN		vs. No. 19 Memphis; Battle 4 Atlantis tournament quarterfinals	W 78–65	3–1	Imperial Arena (3,258); Nassau, Bahamas
November 23*; 7:00 pm, NBCSN		vs. No. 5 Duke; Battle 4 Atlantis Tournament semifinals	L 58–67	3–2	Imperial Arena (3,474); Nassau, Bahamas
November 24*; 7:00 pm, NBCSN		vs. No. 13 Missouri; Battle 4 Atlantis Tournament 3rd place game	L 65–68	3–3	Imperial Arena (3,451); Nassau, Bahamas
November 28*; 7:30 pm, WTVR 6.3		Stetson	W 92–56	4–3	Stuart C. Siegel Center (7,693); Richmond, VA
December 1*; 7:00 pm, CSN		Belmont	W 75–65	5–3	Stuart C. Siegel Center (7,693); Richmond, VA
December 7*; 9:00 pm		at Old Dominion; Lumber Liquidators Hardwood Classic	W 83–70	6–3	Ted Constant Convocation Center (8,080); Norfolk, VA
December 15*; 4:00 pm, CBSSN		Alabama	W 73–54	7–3	Stuart C. Siegel Center (7,693); Richmond, VA
December 18*; 7:00 pm, NBCSN		WKU	W 76–44	8–3	Stuart C. Siegel Center (7,693); Richmond, VA
December 21*; 7:30 pm, WTVR 6.3		Longwood	W 93–56	9–3	Stuart C. Siegel Center (7,693); Richmond, VA
December 29*; 4:00 pm, WTVR 6.1		Fairleigh Dickinson	W 96–67	10–3	Stuart C. Siegel Center (7,693); Richmond, VA
January 2*; 7:00 pm		at East Tennessee State	W 109–58	11–3	Alliance Center (3,066); Johnson City, TN
January 5*; 5:00 pm, NBCSN		Lehigh	W 59–55	12–3	Stuart C. Siegel Center (7,693); Richmond, VA
Atlantic 10 regular season
January 9; 7:00 pm		Dayton	W 74–62	13–3 (1–0)	Stuart C. Siegel Center (7,693); Richmond, VA
January 12; 4:00 pm, WTVR 6.3		at St. Bonaventure	W 72–65	14–3 (2–0)	Reilly Center (4,675); St. Bonaventure, NY
January 17; 9:00 pm, CBSSN	No. 22	Saint Joseph's	W 92–86 ^{OT}	15–3 (3–0)	Stuart C. Siegel Center (7,693); Richmond, VA
January 19; 7:00 pm	No. 22	at Duquesne	W 90–63	16–3 (4–0)	Palumbo Center (6,278); Pittsburgh, PA
January 24; 7:00 pm, CBSSN	No. 19	at Richmond; Capital City Classic	L 74–86 ^{OT}	16–4 (4–1)	Robins Center (9,071); Richmond, VA
January 26; 8:00 pm	No. 19	La Salle	L 61–69	16–5 (4–2)	Stuart C. Siegel Center (7,693); Richmond, VA
January 30; 7:00 pm, WTVR 6.3		at Rhode Island	W 70–64	17–5 (5–2)	Ryan Center (6,632); Kingston, RI
February 2; 7:00 pm, WTVR 6.1		Fordham	W 81–65	18–5 (6–2)	Stuart C. Siegel Center (7,693); Richmond, VA
February 9; 7:00 pm		at Charlotte	W 68–61	19–5 (7–2)	Dale F. Halton Arena (8,794); Charlotte, NC
February 14; 9:00 pm, CBSSN		Massachusetts	W 86–68	20–5 (8–2)	Stuart C. Siegel Center (7,693); Richmond, VA
February 16; 7:30 pm, CSN		George Washington	W 84–57	21–5 (9–2)	Stuart C. Siegel Center (7,693); Richmond, VA
February 19; 9:00 pm, CBSSN	No. 24	at Saint Louis	L 62–76	21–6 (9–3)	Chaifetz Arena (10,027); St. Louis, MO
February 23; 2:00 pm, CBSSN	No. 24	at Xavier	W 75–71	22–6 (10–3)	Cintas Center (10,039); Cincinnati, OH
March 2; 12:00 pm, ESPN2		No. 20 Butler	W 84–52	23–6 (11–3)	Stuart C. Siegel Center (7,693); Richmond, VA
March 6; 8:00 pm, CBSSN	No. 21	Richmond; Capital City Classic	W 93–82	24–6 (12–3)	Stuart C. Siegel Center (7,693); Richmond, VA
March 10; 12:00 pm, CBS	No. 21	at Temple	L 76–84	24–7 (12–4)	Liacouras Center (10,206); Philadelphia, PA
Atlantic 10 tournament
Mar. 15; 6:30 pm, CSN	(2) No. 25	vs. (10) Saint Joseph's; Quarterfinals	W 82–79	25–7	Barclays Center (7,384); Brooklyn, NY
Mar. 16; 4:00 pm, CBSSN	(2) No. 25	vs. (6) Massachusetts; Semifinals	W 71–62	26–7	Barclays Center (N/A); Brooklyn, NY
Mar. 17; 1:00 pm, CBS	(2) No. 25	vs. (1) No. 16 Saint Louis; Championship Game	L 56–62	26–8	Barclays Center (N/A); Brooklyn, NY
NCAA tournament
Mar. 21*; 9:45 pm, CBS	(5 S)	vs. (12 S) Akron; Second Round	W 88–42	27–8	The Palace of Auburn Hills (19,829); Auburn Hills, MI
Mar. 23*; 12:15 pm, CBS	(5 S)	vs. (4 S) No. 10 Michigan; Third Round	L 53–78	27–9	The Palace of Auburn Hills (21,723); Auburn Hills, MI
*Non-conference game. ^{#}Rankings from AP Poll. (#) Tournament seedings in parentheses. All times are in Eastern Time. (#) during NCAA Tournament is seed with Region S=South.

== Accolades ==
=== Honors and awards ===
Sophomore guard Brianté Weber was named the Atlantic 10 Defensive Player Of The Year. Junior forward Juvonte Reddic and Sophomore guard/forward Treveon Graham were named to the Second Team All Atlantic 10. Weber and Senior guard Darius Theus were named to the Atlantic-10 All-Defensive Team. Freshman guard Melvin Johnson was named to the Atlantic 10 All-Rookie Team.
