= 2013 Atlantic Sun men's basketball tournament =

Collegiate basketball tournament

- 2013 Atlantic Sun Tournament Logo
- Classification: Division I
- Season: 2012–13
- Teams: 8
- Site: Hawkins Arena; Macon, Georgia
- Champions: Florida Gulf Coast (1st title)
- Winning coach: Andy Enfield (1st title)
- MVP: Brett Comer (Florida Gulf Coast)

2012–13 Atlantic Sun men's basketball standings
	Conf.				Overall
Team	W		L	PCT	W		L	PCT
Mercer	14	–	4	.778	24	–	12	.667
Florida Gulf Coast †	13	–	5	.722	26	–	11	.703
Stetson	11	–	7	.611	15	–	16	.484
USC Upstate	9	–	9	.500	16	–	17	.485
Jacksonville	9	–	9	.500	14	–	18	.438
Northern Kentucky*	9	–	9	.500	11	–	16	.407
North Florida	8	–	10	.444	13	–	19	.406
East Tennessee State	8	–	10	.444	10	–	22	.313
Lipscomb	7	–	11	.389	12	–	18	.400
Kennesaw State	2	–	16	.111	3	–	27	.100
† 2013 Atlantic Sun Tournament winner As of March 29, 2013; Rankings from AP Poll *ineligible for postseason play due to Div. I transition

The 2013 Atlantic Sun men's basketball tournament took place from March 6–9, 2013 at Hawkins Arena in Macon, Georgia.

== Format ==
The A-Sun Championship was a four-day single-elimination tournament. The top eight teams (with the exception of Northern Kentucky) competed in the championship. As part of their transition to Division I from Division II, Northern Kentucky was not eligible for post season play until 2017, including the A-Sun tournament. The winner of the tournament earned the A-Sun's automatic bid into the 2013 NCAA tournament.

Defending champion Belmont was not in the tournament, as they moved to the Ohio Valley Conference for the 2012-13 season.

== Bracket ==
Quarterfinals; March 6–7
1	Mercer	82
8	Lipscomb	48
4	Jacksonville	62
5	USC Upstate	76
3	Stetson	67
6	East Tennessee State	46
2	Florida Gulf Coast	73
7	North Florida	63

Semifinals; March 8
1	Mercer	72
5	USC Upstate	64
3	Stetson	58
2	Florida Gulf Coast	72

Championship Game; March 9
1	Mercer	75
2	Florida Gulf Coast	88

== See also ==
- 2012-13 NCAA Division I men's basketball season
- Atlantic Sun men's basketball tournament
