= Scott Sanderson (basketball) =

American basketball player and coach

Current position
- Title: Head coach
- Team: Faulkner
- Conference: SSAC
- Record: 66–37 (.641)

Biographical details
- Born: June 15, 1962 (age 64)

Playing career
- 1980–1984: South Carolina
- Position: Guard

Coaching career (HC unless noted)
- 1984–1985: South Carolina (asst.)
- 1985–1987: Faulkner (asst.)
- 1987–1988: Virginia (asst.)
- 1988–1990: New Orleans (asst.)
- 1990–1996: Colorado (asst.)
- 1996–1999: Mobile
- 1999–2013: Lipscomb
- 2014-present: Faulkner

Head coaching record
- Overall: 372–263

Accomplishments and honors

Championships
- A-Sun regular season championship (2006), SSAC Tournament Championship (2016)

Awards
- NAIA Coach of the Year (1999); A-Sun Coach of the Year (2006)

Scott Sanderson (born June 15, 1962) is the former head men's basketball coach at Lipscomb University. He resigned from his position after 14 years on April 9, 2013. Sanderson is the son of former University of Alabama head coach Wimp Sanderson.
