= Clarksville Academy =

Private school in Tennessee, United States

Location
- 710 North 2nd Street; Clarksville, TN; 37040; United States; 36.5363268°N 87.3650391°W

Information
- Type: Private, College-preparatory
- Established: November 14, 1969; 56 years ago
- Head of school: Jennifer Hinote
- Grades: Pre-K–12
- Colors: Blue and Gold
- Athletics: 13 varsity sports, 6 middle school sports TSSAA Class A
- Team name: Cougars
- Website: http://www.clarksvilleacademy.com

Clarksville Academy is a private college-preparatory school in Clarksville, Tennessee, United States, offering pre-kindergarten through grade 12. The school has several sports teams with a cougar as their mascot and school colors being royal blue and yellow gold.

== History ==
School desegregation had gotten off to a quick start in nearby Nashville in 1957, then slowed. The Nashville Plan for grade-a-year public school desegregation had been declared illegal in 1968. A 1969 court decision mandated local public schools to be completed for the 1970–71 school year. A group of Clarksville parents met for the first time on November 14, 1969, to organize a new school for the area. Clarksville Academy opened August 31, 1970, for classes in grades one through nine.

The campus expanded, adding four new buildings and a nearby sports complex in the year 2007.

In August 2008, Clarksville Academy installed ActivClassroomss in a majority of the rooms to allow interactive learning with the students.

In August 2013, Clarksville Academy instituted its 1:1 technology program where each student has a device. All elementary school and middle students have an Apple iPad. All high school students have an Apple MacBook. Each instructor has both an Apple iPad and MacBook and each classroom is equipped with an Apple TV.

=== Sports successes ===
After a 15–8 record, and victories in the District 10-A, Region 5-A, and Class A sectional, tournaments, the varsity boys basketball team, led by 6'6" Malcolm Smith entered the 2009 TSSAA Class A state tournament for the first time in school history. They played on March 18 against the Summertown Eagles, with over 95% of the school there to root them on. It was a long and hard-fought game, and they came away with a 53–50 loss.

The next year, the basketball team made a record 36-2 stand, ranking first in the TSSAA basketball standings. With another district and region victory, they gained a second entrance into the state championships. They played against the Wayne County Wildcats and the CSAS Patriots in the quarterfinals and semifinals, respectively. The Cougars fought hard against the Grace Baptist Golden Eagles in the finals and won 82–77 in double overtime.

== Accreditation and membership ==
The school is accredited by the Southern Association of Colleges and Schools, and hold membership with the National Association of Independent Schools, Educational Records Bureau, Fellowship of Christian Athletes, Key Club and Builders Club, National Honor and National Junior Honor Societies, and College Board.
