= Edmunds Center =

Multi-purpose arena in DeLand, Florida

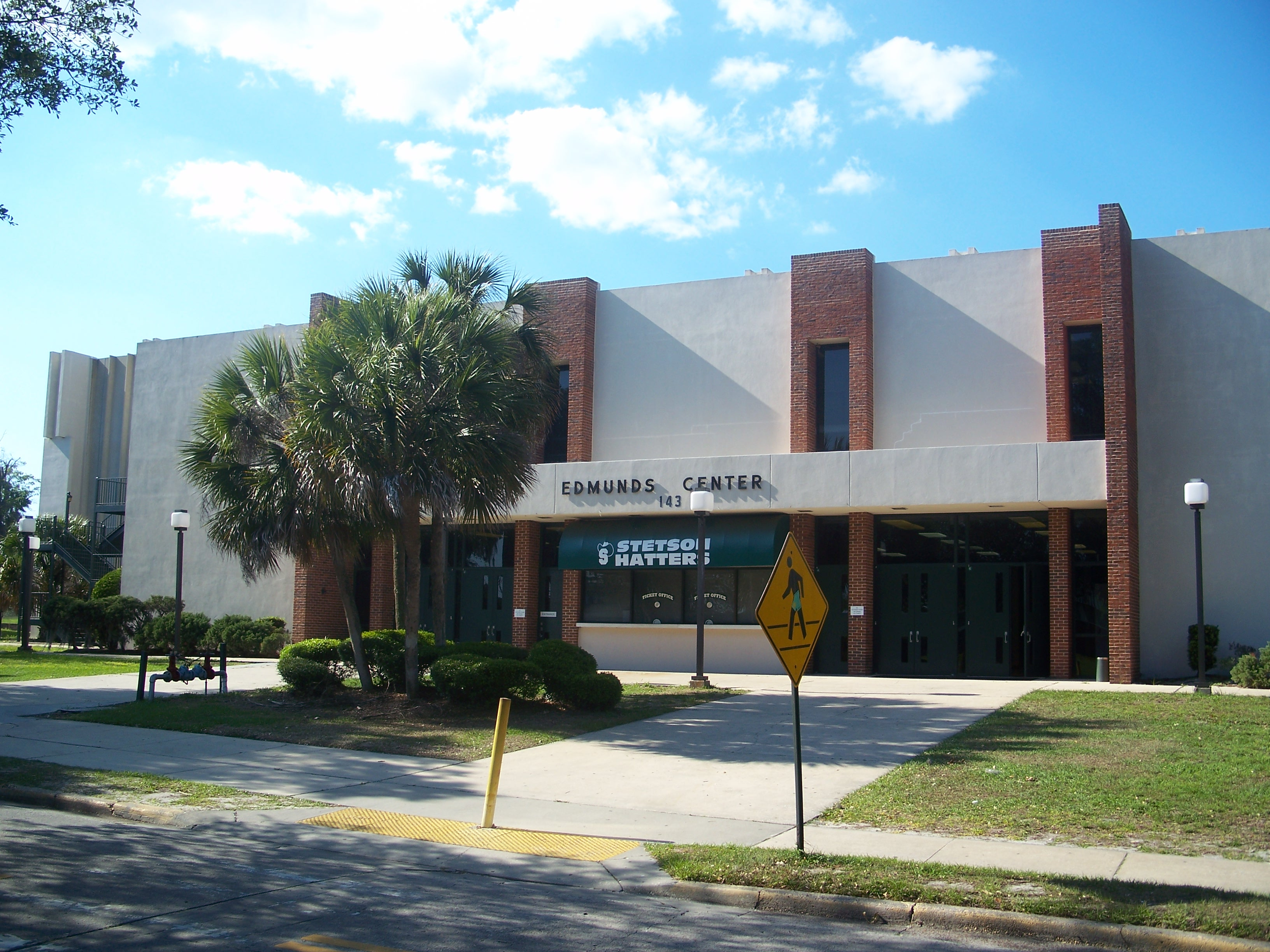
- Interactive map of Edmunds Center
- Location: 143 E. Pennsylvania Ave; DeLand, Florida 32723
- Coordinates: 29.039584°N 81.301819°W
- Owner: Stetson University
- Operator: Stetson University
- Capacity: 5,000
- Surface: Hardwood

Construction
- Opened: December 5, 1974
- Cost: $1.6 million ($10.4 million in 2025 dollars)

Tenant
- Stetson Hatters (NCAA Sports)

Edmunds Center is a 5,000-seat multi-purpose arena at Stetson University in DeLand, Florida, that opened on December 5, 1974. It is home to the Stetson Hatters basketball team. The arena is named after J. Ollie Edmunds, fourth president of Stetson University (1948–1967).

It hosted the 1991 and 1996 Atlantic Sun Conference men's basketball tournaments. Many different celebrities and musicians have performed at the Edmunds Center over the years. Notable performers include comedians Bill Cosby, Jay Leno, Steve Martin, and Steven Wright; country music legends Hank Williams, Jr., and Mel Tillis; The Nitty Gritty Dirt Band; Spyro Gyra; and folk singers Harry Chapin, and Don McLean.

== See also ==
- List of NCAA Division I basketball arenas
