= Convocation Center (Kennesaw State University) =

Arena in Georgia, USA

- The Convo
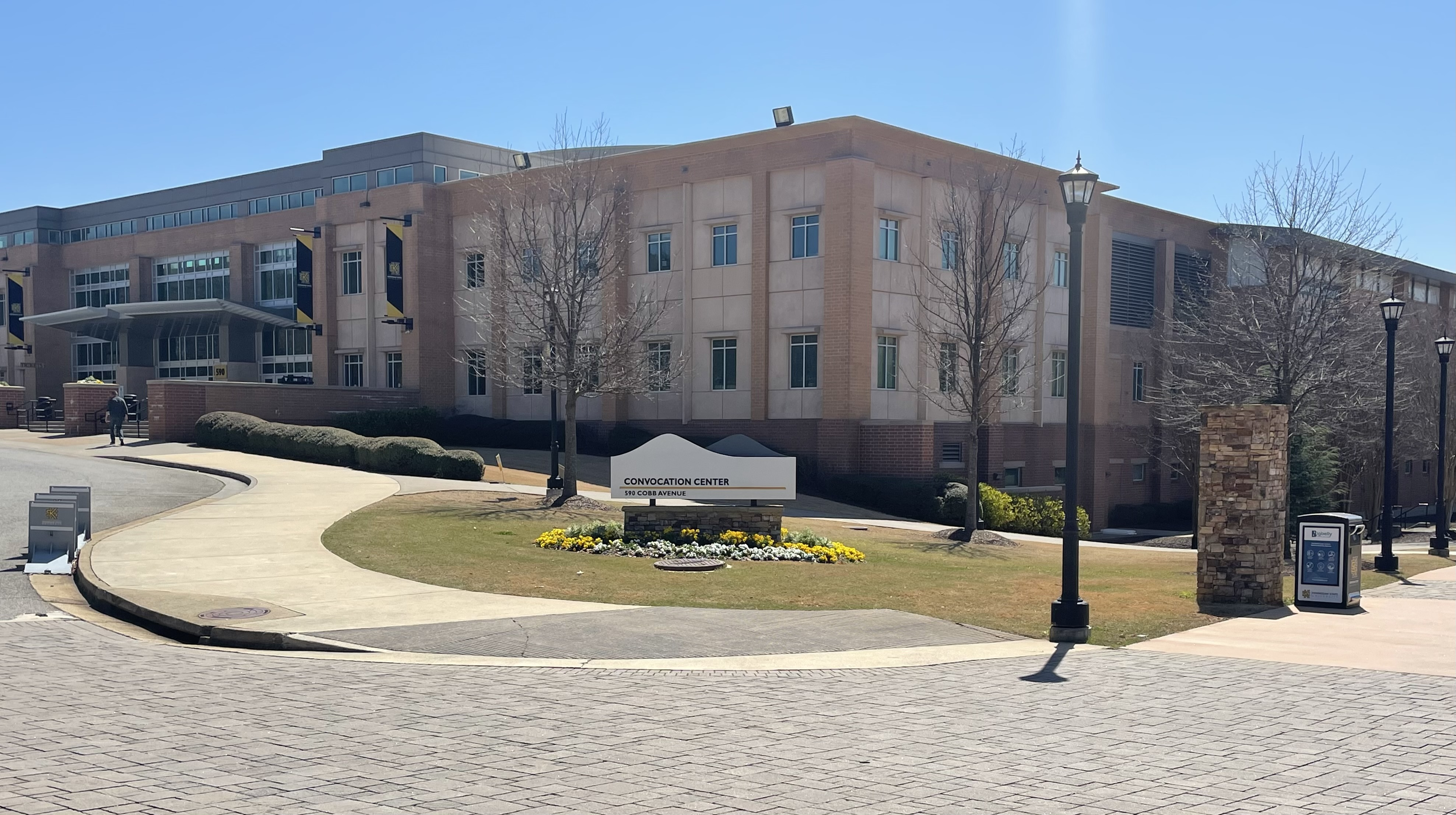
- Interactive map of Convocation Center
- Full name: VyStar Arena at the Convocation Center
- Location: 590 Cobb Avenue; Kennesaw, GA 30144
- Coordinates: 34.036924°N 84.580329°W
- Owner: Kennesaw State University
- Operator: Kennesaw State University
- Capacity: 3,805
- Surface: Hardwood

Construction
- Groundbreaking: January 17, 2003
- Opened: May 12, 2005
- Cost: $17.71 million ($29.2 million in 2025 dollars)
- Architect: Heery International
- Project managers: Draper & Associates
- Structural engineers: Engineering Design Technologies, Inc.
- General contractor: Kajima Construction Services

Tenants
- Kennesaw State Owls (NCAA); Men's basketball (2005–present); Women's basketball (2005–present); Women's volleyball (2005–present)

The Convocation Center (the interior of the facility also carrying the secondary name of VyStar Arena) is a multipurpose arena on the campus of Kennesaw State University in Kennesaw, Georgia, United States. The arena has a listed seating capacity of 3,805 people and opened in 2005. It is home to the Kennesaw State Owls men's basketball, women's basketball, and women's volleyball teams, as well as the administrative offices for the KSU athletic department. It is also available for other events and has hosted concerts, conferences, and trade shows, as well as sporting events.

On August 13, 2025, Kennesaw State University announced it had signed a deal with VyStar Credit Union to rename the interior of the Convocation Center as VyStar Arena. The deal is worth $4 million cumulative and is expected to last 10 years, and will see the credit union take an expanded role in operations of the facility, most notably offering discounted tickets to customers/patrons who serve in the military or as first responders.

== Gallery ==
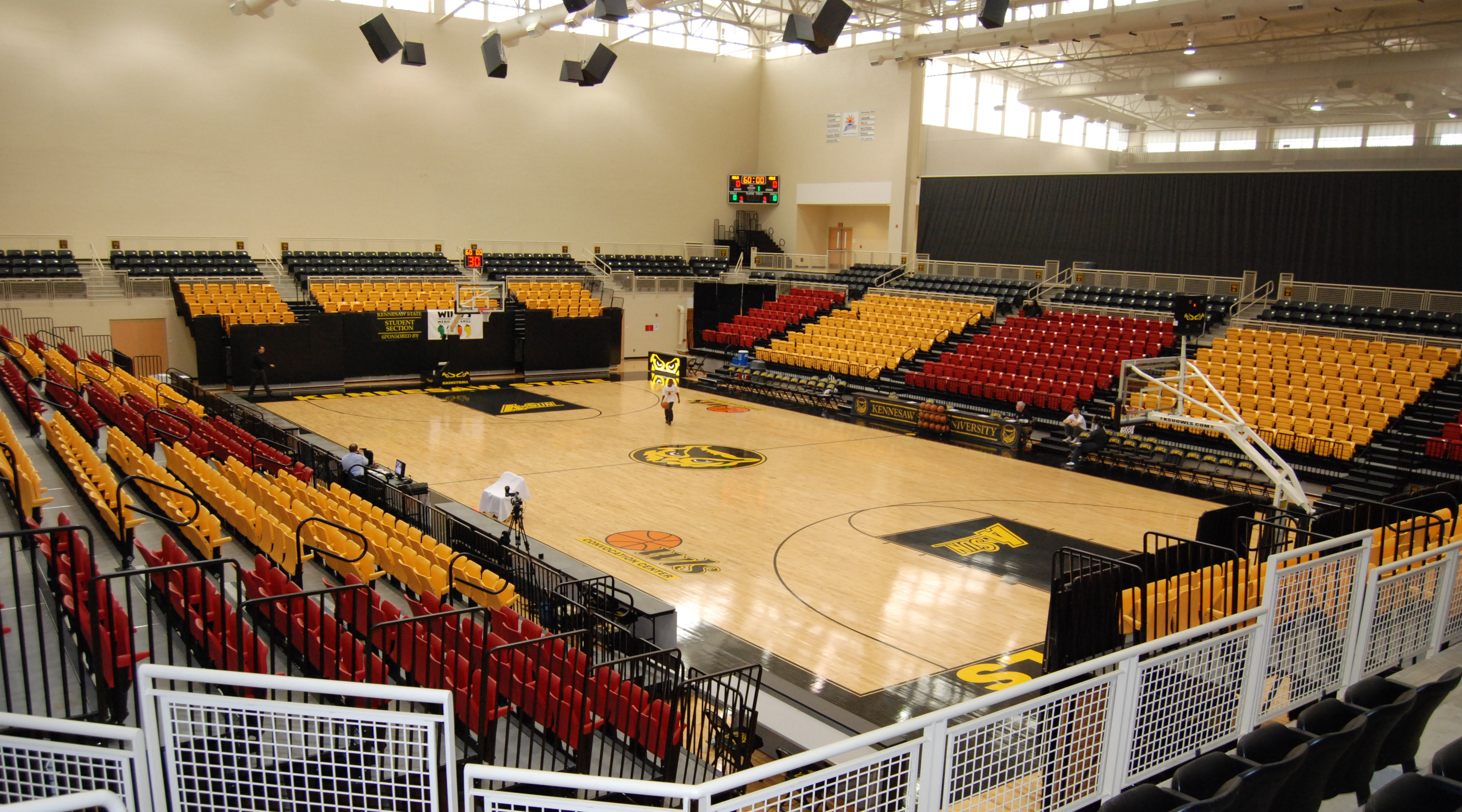
Interior of the Convocation Center in 2007

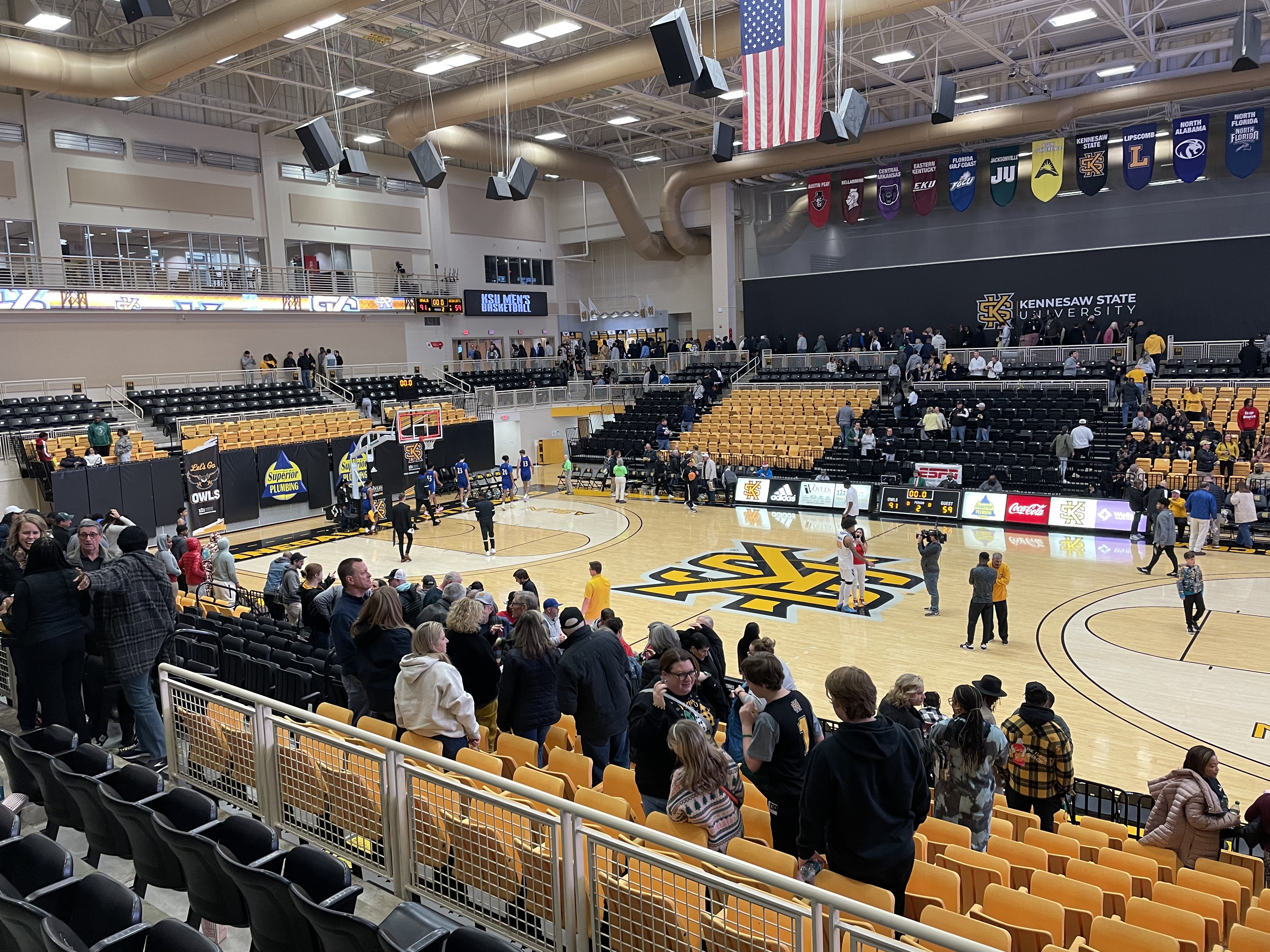
Interior of the Convocation Center in 2023

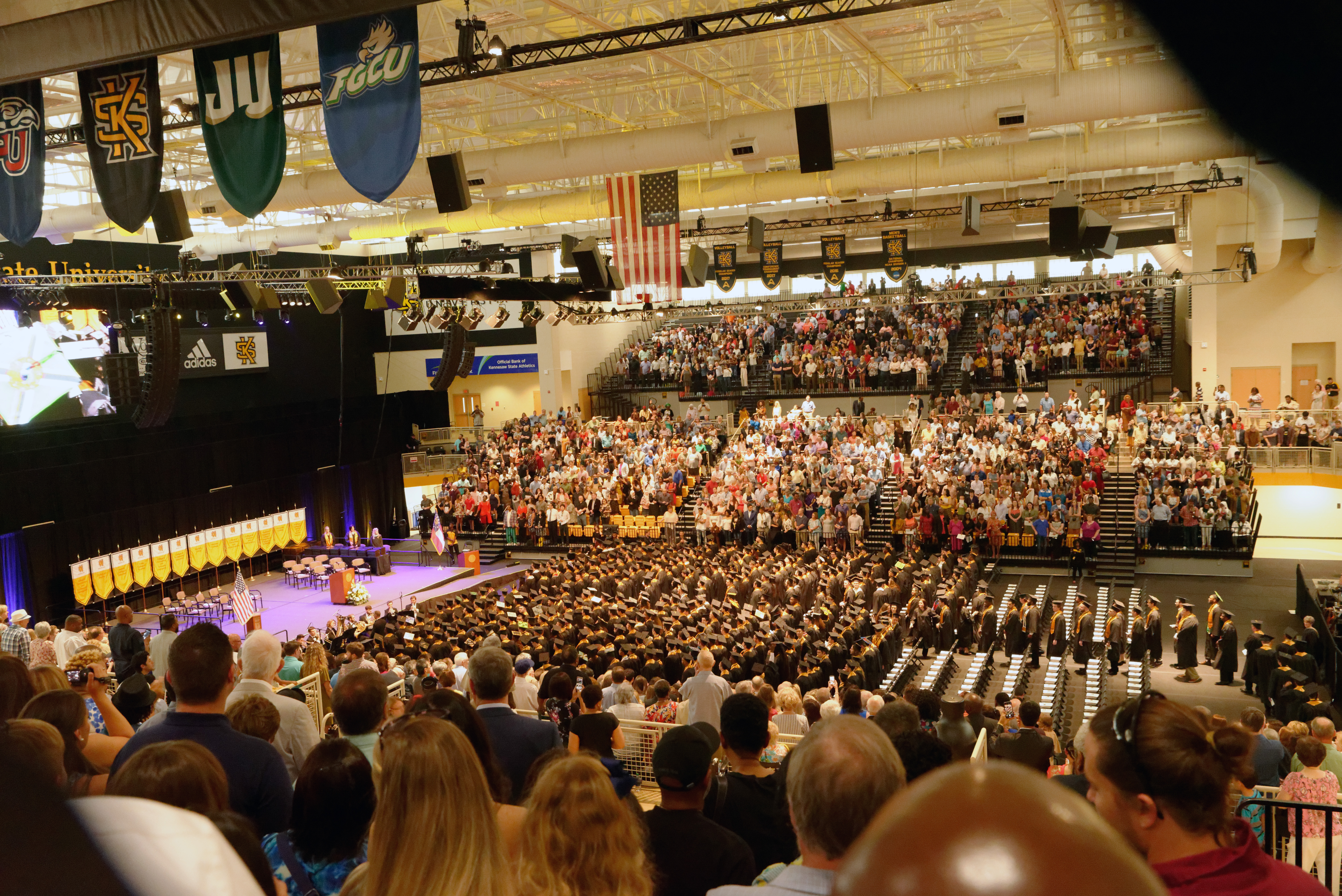
Convocation Center during Spring 2019 graduation ceremony

== See also ==
- List of NCAA Division I basketball arenas
