= G. B. Hodge Center =

Arena in Spartanburg, South Carolina

- Interactive map of G. B. Hodge Center
- Coordinates: 34.996696°N 81.968774°W
- Owner: University of South Carolina Upstate
- Operator: University of South Carolina Upstate
- Capacity: 878
- Surface: Hardwood

Construction
- Groundbreaking: February 14, 1972
- Opened: January 10, 1973
- Renovated: 2000, 2010
- Cost: $1 million ($7.25 million in 2025 dollars)
- Architect: Lockwood, Greene & Co.
- General contractor: Threatt–Maxwell Construction Company

Tenants
- USC Upstate Spartans; UNC Asheville Bulldogs (2024)

G. B. Hodge Center is an 878-seat multi-purpose arena in Spartanburg, South Carolina. It is home to the USC Upstate Spartans' basketball and volleyball teams. It was opened in 1973 and is named for one of the university's founders.

In terms of seating capacity, the G. B. Hodge Center is the smallest arena in Division I men's basketball.

== History ==
The G. B. Hodge Center hosted its first-ever top-25 ranked opponent when it welcomed the No. 25-ranked Furman Paladins on December 8, 2018. The matchup between the Spartans and the Paladins was also the first time that USC Upstate had hosted a top-25 opponent since becoming an NCAA Division I program during the 2007–08 season. With 353 teams currently competing in NCAA Division I men's basketball, it also marked the first time that the division's smallest arena had hosted a ranked opponent. Although leading 34–30 at halftime, the Spartans ultimately fell to the Paladins, 74–60.

The Hodge Center served as a temporary home for UNC Asheville's volleyball team after their campus sustained damage from Hurricane Helene.

== Renovations ==
In October 2009, it was announced that the G. B. Hodge Center would undergo a large renovation thanks to the $4 million donation from alumnus Dolores Anderson. Anderson is a longtime fan of the University of South Carolina Upstate basketball team, particularly the men's team. She is the former co owner of Anderson Hardwood Company. This gift is the largest donation to the university athletic department and second largest ever to the university. Plans for the new arena include brand new floors, lighting, scoreboards, locker rooms, and seating. The university believes that the new renovation will help move into a second renovation later that would create a new entrance and new athletic department offices.

The newly renovated facility was dedicated on December 5, 2010, against East Tennessee State.

== See also ==
- List of NCAA Division I basketball arenas
