= ETSU/Mountain States Health Alliance Athletic Center =

Multi-sport arena in Johnson City, Tennessee

Coordinates: 36°18′13″N 82°22′15″W

ETSU Athletics Center
- Mini-Dome

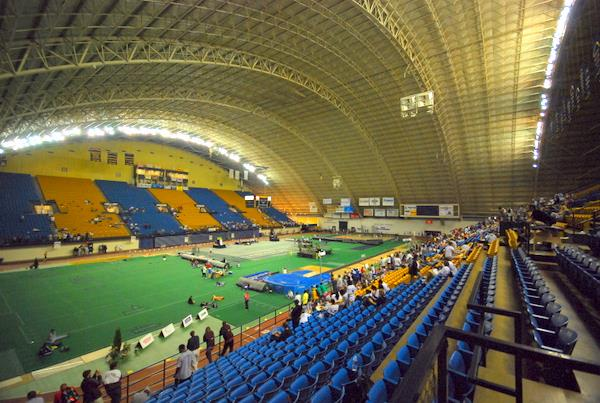
- Interior view of the arena in 2007
- Interactive map of ETSU Athletics Center
- Former names: Memorial Center
- Address: Johnson City, Tennessee; United States
- Owner: ETSU
- Operator: ETSU Athletics
- Capacity: 8,539
- Type: Arena
- Current use: Basketball; Tennis; Track and field

Construction
- Opened: 1977; 49 years ago

Tenants
- ETSU Buccaneers (NCAA) teams: men's and women's basketball; East Tennessee State Buccaneers football (1977–2003)

Website
- etsubucs.com/etsu-athletics-center

ETSU Athletics Center, previously known as the Memorial Center, and popularly referred to as the "Mini-Dome", is an 8,539-seat multi-purpose arena on the campus of East Tennessee State University in Johnson City, Tennessee. Until 2014, it hosted ETSU's men's and women's basketball teams. It also serves as the indoor venue for tennis and track. At one time, the facility also hosted ETSU's football team, but the school discontinued its football program at the end of the 2003 season as a cost-cutting measure.

The football team was reinstated in 2015, but did not return to the facility; the Buccaneers played the 2015 and 2016 seasons at Kermit Tipton Stadium, a local high school facility, before opening the new William B. Greene Jr. Stadium in 2017. It was the host of the 2006 and 2007 Atlantic Sun Conference men's basketball tournaments, and the NAIA Indoor Track and Field Championships from 2001 to 2011. The Mini-Dome has also hosted non-athletic events that could not be housed in an indoor setting on most American college campuses, such as national indoor championships for free flight model aircraft. It has also hosted a Bands of America Regional (marching band) since 2019.

In December 2009, the Tennessee Board of Regents approved the renaming of Memorial Center to ETSU/Mountain States Health Alliance Athletic Center, adding the name of the hospital system headquartered in Johnson City to the official name of the Mini-Dome.

On October 16, 2010, the ETSU/MSHA Athletic Center hosted an NBA exhibition game between the New Orleans Hornets and Atlanta Hawks.

== History ==
Dominating the campus skyline, the building was opened in 1977 largely as an attempt to increase attendance at the university's struggling football program and to help its recruiting, but also as a large, multi-purpose campus building. The contract ran both well over budget and the allotted time, with the eventual opening occurring two football seasons later than had been planned.

The building has had its successes but never truly put the Buccaneer football program on the map, despite being one of very few on-campus domed stadiums in the United States. The decision was made by ETSU president Dr. Paul Stanton for ETSU to drop football following the conclusion of the 2003 season.

For the 2006–2007 academic year and basketball season, the Mini-Dome's occupancy was decreased to around 6,800 due to fire code restrictions. Efforts are underway to build a true basketball arena on campus, but the Mini-Dome will likely remain intact due to the large number of offices and training facilities it contains, as well as the enormous cost of demolition.

In 2006–2007, ETSU made an attempt to bring back the football program, but it failed when the student body voted down an increase in the athletic fee that was needed to fund it. The Mini-Dome was not considered as a possible venue for the new program.

The interior of the Mini-Dome is pictured briefly in the ending moments of the film We Are Marshall during a sequence of highlights of the Marshall University football team.
