= 2023–24 Stetson Hatters men's basketball team =

American college basketball season

2023–24 Stetson Hatters men's basketball
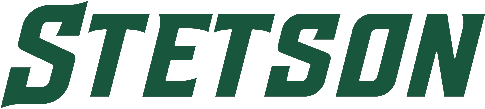

ASUN tournament champions Sunshine Slam Ocean champions

NCAA tournament, first round
- Conference: ASUN Conference
- Record: 22–13 (11–5 ASUN)
- Head coach: Donnie Jones (5th season)
- Assistant coaches: Shawn Finney; Brett Comer; Joey Gruden; Montay Brandon
- Home arena: Edmunds Center

2023–24 ASUN men's basketball standings
	Conf.				Overall
Team	W		L	PCT	W		L	PCT
Eastern Kentucky	12	–	4	.750	17	–	14	.548
Stetson †	11	–	5	.688	22	–	13	.629
Lipscomb	11	–	5	.688	20	–	12	.625
Austin Peay	10	–	6	.625	19	–	16	.543
North Florida	9	–	7	.563	16	–	16	.500
North Alabama	8	–	8	.500	15	–	17	.469
Florida Gulf Coast	8	–	8	.500	14	–	18	.438
Queens*	7	–	9	.438	14	–	19	.424
Kennesaw State	6	–	10	.375	15	–	16	.484
Jacksonville	5	–	11	.313	16	–	17	.485
Central Arkansas	5	–	11	.313	9	–	23	.281
Bellarmine*	4	–	12	.250	8	–	23	.258
† 2024 ASUN tournament winner * ineligible for the 2024 NCAA tournament due to transition from Division II

The 2023–24 Stetson Hatters men's basketball team represented Stetson University during the 2023–24 NCAA Division I men's basketball season. The Hatters, led by fifth-year head coach Donnie Jones, played their home games at the Edmunds Center located in DeLand, Florida as members of the ASUN Conference. They finished the season 22–13, 11–5 in ASUN play, to finish in a tie for second place. As the No. 2 seed in the ASUN tournament, they defeated Queens, Jacksonville and Austin Peay to win the ASUN tournament championship; as a result, they received the conference's automatic bid to the NCAA tournament for the first time in school history. As a No. 16 seed in the East region, they lost to number one overall seed and eventual champion UConn in the first round.

== Previous season ==
The Hatters finished the 2022–23 season 17–13, 12–6 in ASUN play, to finish in fourth place. They lost in the quarterfinals of the ASUN tournament to Lipscomb. Stetson received an invitation to play in the CBI, where they lost in overtime to Milwaukee in the first round. The 2022–23 season marked the Hatters' first winning record since 2001.

== Roster ==
2023–24 Stetson Hatters men's basketball team
Players
Coaches

Pos.	#	Name	Height	Weight	Year	Previous school	Hometown
G	0	Alec Oglesby	6 ft 5 in (1.96 m)	187 lb (85 kg)	Sr	UNC Wilmington	Gainesville, FL
G	1	Tristan Gross	6 ft 6 in (1.98 m)	—	Fr	St. Petersburg HS	St. Petersburg, FL
G/F	2	Bruce Kanno	6 ft 7 in (2.01 m)	—	So	Ellsworth CC	Iwate, Japan
G	3	Giancarlo Valdez	6 ft 3 in (1.91 m)	170 lb (77 kg)	RS Jr	Decatur Heritage Christian Academy	Santo Domingo, Dominican Republic
G	4	Isaac Jones	6 ft 1 in (1.85 m)	—	Fr	Father Lopez Catholic HS	DeLand, FL
G	5	Jalen Blackmon	6 ft 3 in (1.91 m)	180 lb (82 kg)	Jr	Grand Canyon	Marion, IN
F	11	Josh Smith	6 ft 9 in (2.06 m)	215 lb (98 kg)	Jr	Monrovia HS	Monrovia, IN
F	13	Alex Doyle	6 ft 9 in (2.06 m)	—	Fr	DME Academy	Paris, France
G/F	14	Jackson Huxtable	6 ft 6 in (1.98 m)	200 lb (91 kg)	RS Fr	Montverde Academy	Sydney, Australia
C	21	Aubin Gateretse	6 ft 11 in (2.11 m)	210 lb (95 kg)	Jr	Calusa Prep	Charleroi, Belgium
G	23	Cyncier Harrison	6 ft 0 in (1.83 m)	160 lb (73 kg)	RS So	New Faith Christian Academy	Greenville, GA
F	24	Finley Sheridan	6 ft 10 in (2.08 m)	—	RS Fr	Long Island Lutheran HS	Merrick, NY
G	25	Naeem Lewis	6 ft 1 in (1.85 m)	—	Jr	West Los Angeles College	Los Angeles, CA
G	30	Stephan Swenson	6 ft 2 in (1.88 m)	195 lb (88 kg)	Sr	Westminster Academy	Brussels, Belgium
F	33	Landen Babusiak	6 ft 10 in (2.08 m)	—	Fr	Bosco Institute	St. John, IN
F	42	Treyton Thompson	7 ft 0 in (2.13 m)	210 lb (95 kg)	Jr	Minnesota	Glenwood, MN

Head coach

- Donnie Jones (Pikeville)

Assistant coach(es)

- Shawn Finney (Fairmont State)
- Brett Comer (Florida Gulf Coast)
- Joey Gruden (Dayton)
- Montay Brandon (Florida State)

Legend

- (C) Team captain
- (S) Suspended
- (I) Ineligible
- (W) Walk-on
- Injured
- Current redshirt

Roster
Last update: November 13, 2023

== Schedule and results ==
Date time, TV	Rank^{#}	Opponent^{#}	Result	Record	Site (attendance) city, state
Exhibition
November 1, 2023*; 7:00 p.m., ESPN+		Florida Tech	W 78–65	–	Edmunds Center; DeLand, FL
Regular season
November 6, 2023*; 7:00 p.m., ESPN+		Trinity Baptist	W 109–54	1–0	Edmunds Center (568); DeLand, FL
November 11, 2023*; 7:00 p.m.		at UNLV; Sunshine Slam campus-site game	L 55–71	1–1	Thomas & Mack Center (5,003); Paradise, NV
November 13, 2023*; 8:00 p.m., ESPN+		at No. 6 Houston	L 48–79	1–2	Fertitta Center (7,104); Houston, TX
November 20, 2023*; 1:30 p.m., FloHoops		vs. Milwaukee; Sunshine Slam Ocean Bracket semifinals	W 85–67	2–2	Ocean Center; Daytona Beach, FL
November 21, 2023*; 1:30 p.m., FloHoops		vs. Central Michigan; Sunshine Slam Ocean Bracket championship	W 71–61	3–2	Ocean Center; Daytona Beach, FL
November 26, 2023*; 4:00 p.m., ESPN+		at UCF	W 85–82	4–2	Addition Financial Arena (5,089); Orlando, FL
November 29, 2023*; 7:00 p.m., ESPN+		Coastal Georgia	W 94–49	5–2	Edmunds Center (490); DeLand, FL
December 3, 2023*; 2:00 p.m.		at Chicago State	L 54–77	5–3	Jones Convocation Center (116); Chicago, IL
December 5, 2023*; 7:00 p.m., ESPN+		at Charlotte	L 62–85	5–4	Dale F. Halton Arena (2,708); Charlotte, NC
December 10, 2023*; 2:00 p.m., ESPN+		Johnson (FL)	W 123–43	6–4	Edmunds Center (417); DeLand, FL
December 17, 2023*; 2:00 p.m.		at Omaha	L 80–88	6–5	Baxter Arena (1,839); Omaha, NE
December 19, 2023*; 7:00 p.m., ESPN+		at FIU	W 80–68	7–5	Ocean Bank Convocation Center (709); Miami, FL
December 22, 2023*; 7:00 p.m., ESPN+		at Cincinnati	L 75–83	7–6	Fifth Third Arena (9,762); Cincinnati, OH
December 29, 2023*; 7:00 p.m., ESPN+		Charlotte	W 79–75	8–6	Edmunds Center (457); DeLand, FL
January 4, 2024; 7:00 p.m., ESPN+		North Florida	W 75–74	9–6 (1–0)	Edmunds Center (534); DeLand, FL
January 6, 2024; 2:00 p.m., ESPN+		Jacksonville	W 71–55	10–6 (2–0)	Edmunds Center (515); DeLand, FL
January 10, 2024; 7:00 p.m., ESPN+		at Kennesaw State	L 70–88	10–7 (2–1)	KSU Convocation Center (1,729); Kennesaw, GA
January 12, 2024; 7:00 p.m., ESPN+		at Queens	W 84–66	11–7 (3–1)	Curry Arena (455); Charlotte, NC
January 15, 2024*; 7:00 p.m., ESPN+		Chicago State	L 70–77	11–8	Edmunds Center (723); DeLand, FL
January 20, 2024; 7:00 p.m., ESPN+		at Florida Gulf Coast	L 56–80	11–9 (3–2)	Alico Arena (2,634); Fort Myers, FL
January 25, 2024; 7:00 p.m., ESPN+		Austin Peay	W 83–82	12–9 (4–2)	Edmunds Center (939); DeLand, FL
January 27, 2024; 2:00 p.m., ESPN+		Lipscomb	W 80–59	13–9 (5–2)	Edmunds Center (596); DeLand, FL
February 1, 2024; 8:45 p.m., ESPN+		at North Alabama	L 72–79	13–10 (5–3)	CB&S Bank Arena (1,267); Florence, AL
February 3, 2024; 4:30 p.m., ESPN+		at Central Arkansas	W 73–62	14–10 (6–3)	Farris Center (1,245); Conway, AR
February 7, 2024; 6:30 p.m., ESPN+		at Bellarmine	W 84–77	15–10 (7–3)	Freedom Hall (1,523); Louisville, KY
February 10, 2024; 4:45 p.m., ESPN+		Eastern Kentucky	W 87–79	16–10 (8–3)	Edmunds Center (882); DeLand, FL
February 17, 2024; 2:00 p.m., ESPN+		Florida Gulf Coast	W 61–60	17–10 (9–3)	Edmunds Center (892); DeLand, FL
February 22, 2024; 7:00 p.m., ESPN+		Queens	L 77–83	17–11 (9–4)	Edmunds Center (441); DeLand, FL
February 24, 2024; 2:00 p.m., ESPN+		Kennesaw State	W 84–72	18–11 (10–4)	Edmunds Center (580); DeLand, FL
February 28, 2024; 7:00 p.m., ESPN+		at Jacksonville	W 86–73	19–11 (11–4)	Swisher Gymnasium (711); Jacksonville, FL
March 1, 2024; 7:00 p.m., ESPN+		at North Florida	L 59–78	19–12 (11–5)	UNF Arena (1,789); Jacksonville, FL
ASUN tournament
March 5, 2024; 7:00 p.m., ESPN+	(2)	(8) Queens; Quarterfinals	W 83–71	20–12	Edmunds Center (672); DeLand, FL
March 7, 2024; 7:00 p.m., ESPN+	(2)	(10) Jacksonville; Semifinals	W 88–87	21–12	Edmunds Center (976); DeLand, FL
March 10, 2024; 2:00 p.m., ESPN2	(2)	(4) Austin Peay; Championship	W 94–91	22–12	Edmunds Center (2,328); DeLand, FL
NCAA tournament
March 22, 2024*; 2:45 p.m., CBS	(16 E)	vs. (1 E) No. 1 UConn; First round	L 52–91	22–13	Barclays Center (17,183); Brooklyn, NY
*Non-conference game. ^{#}Rankings from AP poll. (#) Tournament seedings in parentheses. All times are in Eastern.
