= 2023–24 Jacksonville Dolphins men's basketball team =

American college basketball season

2023–24 Jacksonville Dolphins men's basketball
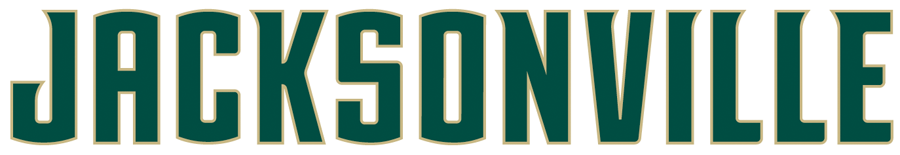
- Conference: ASUN Conference
- Record: 16–17 (5–11 ASUN)
- Head coach: Jordan Mincy (3rd season)
- Associate head coach: Michael Fly
- Assistant coaches: Trevor Deloach; Troy Pierce
- Home arena: Swisher Gymnasium

2023–24 ASUN men's basketball standings
	Conf.				Overall
Team	W		L	PCT	W		L	PCT
Eastern Kentucky	12	–	4	.750	17	–	14	.548
Stetson †	11	–	5	.688	22	–	13	.629
Lipscomb	11	–	5	.688	20	–	12	.625
Austin Peay	10	–	6	.625	19	–	16	.543
North Florida	9	–	7	.563	16	–	16	.500
North Alabama	8	–	8	.500	15	–	17	.469
Florida Gulf Coast	8	–	8	.500	14	–	18	.438
Queens*	7	–	9	.438	14	–	19	.424
Kennesaw State	6	–	10	.375	15	–	16	.484
Jacksonville	5	–	11	.313	16	–	17	.485
Central Arkansas	5	–	11	.313	9	–	23	.281
Bellarmine*	4	–	12	.250	8	–	23	.258
† 2024 ASUN tournament winner * ineligible for the 2024 NCAA tournament due to transition from Division II

The 2023–24 Jacksonville Dolphins men's basketball team represented Jacksonville University during the 2023–24 NCAA Division I men's basketball season. The Dolphins, led by third-year head coach Jordan Mincy, played their home games at Swisher Gymnasium located in Jacksonville, Florida as members of the ASUN Conference.

== Previous season ==
The Dolphins finished the 2022–23 season 13–16, 6–12 in ASUN play to finish in a tie for eleventh place. They failed to qualify for the ASUN tournament.

== Roster ==
2023–24 Jacksonville Dolphins men's basketball team
Players
Coaches

Pos.	#	Name	Height	Weight	Year	Previous school	Hometown
F	0	Stephon Payne III	6 ft 9 in (2.06 m)	220 lb (100 kg)	So	Incarnate Word	Jacksonville, Florida
F	1	DeeJuan Pruitt	6 ft 8 in (2.03 m)	235 lb (107 kg)	GS	SIU Edwardsville	Sacramento, California
G	2	Josiah Sabino	6 ft 4 in (1.93 m)	195 lb (88 kg)	RS Fr	Orange Park High School	Jacksonville, Florida
F	5	Bryce Workman	6 ft 7 in (2.01 m)	230 lb (104 kg)	GS	Sickles High School	Tampa, Florida
G	10	Gyasi Powell	6 ft 3 in (1.91 m)	195 lb (88 kg)	RS Jr	Davis & Elkins	Jacksonville, Florida
G	11	Marcus Niblack	6 ft 2 in (1.88 m)	190 lb (86 kg)	Sr	Northwest Florida State	Leesburg, Florida
C	12	Jonathan Kurtas	6 ft 10 in (2.08 m)	245 lb (111 kg)	Jr	SIU Edwardsville	Mooresville, North Carolina
G	13	Robert McCray V	6 ft 4 in (1.93 m)	186 lb (84 kg)	RS So	Wake Forest	Columbia, South Carolina
G	14	Carson Brown	6 ft 1 in (1.85 m)	180 lb (82 kg)	Jr	South Walton High School	Miramar Beach, Florida
F	15	Tito Deng	6 ft 11 in (2.11 m)	186 lb (84 kg)	Fr	CBA Academy	Warrap, South Sudan
G	20	Jarius Cook	6 ft 3 in (1.91 m)	185 lb (84 kg)	RS Sr	North Dakota State	Brooklyn Park, Minnesota
G	22	Zach Bell	6 ft 2 in (1.88 m)	180 lb (82 kg)	So	Chipola College	Barnwell, South Carolina
G	23	Sejr Deans	6 ft 2 in (1.88 m)	205 lb (93 kg)	So	Launceston College	Launceston, Tasmania
G	31	Jalen Griffith	5 ft 10 in (1.78 m)	140 lb (64 kg)	Fr	Simeon Career Academy	Chicago, Illinois
F	33	Donovan Rivers	6 ft 9 in (2.06 m)	220 lb (100 kg)	Fr	TSF Academy	Columbia, South Carolina
G	35	Lucas Gibb	6 ft 6 in (1.98 m)	190 lb (86 kg)	Fr	Sunrise Christian Academy	Miami Beach, Florida

Head coach

- Jordan Mincy (Kent State)

Assistant coach(es)

- Michael Fly (Kentucky)
- Trevor Deloach (UNC Wilmington)
- Troy Pierce (Emporia State)

Legend

- (C) Team captain
- (S) Suspended
- (I) Ineligible
- (W) Walk-on
- Injured
- Current redshirt

Roster
Last update: November 13, 2023

== Schedule and results ==
Date time, TV	Rank^{#}	Opponent^{#}	Result	Record	Site (attendance) city, state
Non-conference regular season
November 6, 2023*; 7:00 pm, ESPN+		Johnson (FL)	W 113–46	1–0	Swisher Gymnasium (868); Jacksonville, FL
November 10, 2023*; 6:30 pm, FS2		at Xavier	L 56–79	1–1	Cintas Center (10,426); Cincinnati, OH
November 14, 2023*; 7:00 pm, ESPN+		Georgia Southern	W 85–68	2–1	Swisher Gymnasium (782); Jacksonville, FL
November 17, 2023*; 7:00 pm, ESPN+/ACCNX		at Pittsburgh	L 56–107	2–2	Petersen Events Center (7,842); Pittsburgh, PA
November 24, 2023*; 4:00 pm, ESPN+		at Robert Morris; Urban-Bennett Memorial Classic	W 74–65	3–2	UPMC Events Center (838); Moon Township, PA
November 25, 2023*; 4:00 pm, ESPN+		vs. Fairleigh Dickinson; Urban-Bennett Memorial Classic	W 91–90	4–2	UPMC Events Center (131); Moon Township, PA
November 29, 2023*; 6:00 pm, ESPN+		Campbell	W 62–48	5–2	Swisher Gymnasium (456); Jacksonville, FL
December 2, 2023*; 3:00 pm, ESPN+		at Georgia Southern	W 81–79	6–2	Hanner Fieldhouse (2,036); Statesboro, GA
December 6, 2023*; 7:00 pm, ESPN+		at UCF	L 52–94	6–3	Addition Financial Arena (5,278); Orlando, FL
December 11, 2023*; 7:00 pm		at South Carolina State	L 85–86 ^{OT}	6–4	SHM Memorial Center (369); Orangeburg, SC
December 14, 2023*; 5:00 pm, ESPN+		Trinity Baptist	W 91–54	7–4	Swisher Gymnasium (412); Jacksonville, FL
December 18, 2023*; 11:30 am, ESPN+		Louisiana–Monroe	W 75–65	8–4	Swisher Gymnasium (400); Jacksonville, FL
December 21, 2023*; 6:30 pm, BTN		at No. 1 Purdue	L 57–100	8–5	Mackey Arena (14,876); West Lafayette, IN
December 30, 2023*; 3:00 pm, ESPN+		Erskine	W 79–52	9–5	Swisher Gymnasium (904); Jacksonville, FL
ASUN regular season
January 4, 2024; 7:00 pm, ESPN+		at Florida Gulf Coast	L 70–80	9–6 (0–1)	Alico Arena (2,036); Fort Myers, FL
January 6, 2024; 2:00 pm, ESPN+		at Stetson	L 55–71	9–7 (0–2)	Edmunds Center (515); DeLand, FL
January 12, 2024; 7:00 pm, ESPN+		at North Florida	L 74–82	9–8 (0–3)	UNF Arena (4,559); Jacksonville, FL
January 18, 2024; 7:00 pm, ESPN+		Queens	W 79–77	10–8 (1–3)	Swisher Gymnasium (873); Jacksonville, FL
January 20, 2024; 3:00 pm, ESPN+		Kennesaw State	L 79–83	10–9 (1–4)	Swisher Gymnasium (1,081); Jacksonville, FL
January 25, 2024; 7:00 pm, ESPN+		at Eastern Kentucky	L 59–75	10–10 (1–5)	Baptist Health Arena (3,196); Richmond, KY
January 27, 2024; 4:00 pm, ESPN+		at Bellarmine	L 63–69	10–11 (1–6)	Freedom Hall (3,584); Louisville, KY
January 31, 2024; 7:00 pm, ESPN+		Austin Peay	W 63–43	11–11 (2–6)	Swisher Gymnasium (791); Jacksonville, FL
February 3, 2024; 5:00 pm, ESPN+		at Lipscomb	L 82–84	11–12 (2–7)	Allen Arena (1,777); Nashville, TN
February 8, 2024; 7:00 pm, ESPN+		Central Arkansas	W 59–55	12–12 (3–7)	Swisher Gymnasium (885); Jacksonville, FL
February 10, 2024; 3:00 pm, ESPN+		North Alabama	W 67–63	13–12 (4–7)	Swisher Gymnasium (772); Jacksonville, FL
February 14, 2024; 7:00 pm, ESPN+		at Kennesaw State	L 61–66	13–13 (4–8)	KSU Convocation Center (1,158); Kennesaw, GA
February 16, 2024; 7:00 pm, ESPN+		at Queens	L 65–74	13–14 (4–9)	Curry Arena (326); Charlotte, NC
February 23, 2024; 7:00 pm, ESPN+		North Florida	W 62–50	14–14 (5–9)	Swisher Gymnasium (2,500); Jacksonville, FL
February 28, 2024; 7:00 pm, ESPN+		Stetson	L 73–86	14–15 (5–10)	Swisher Gymnasium (711); Jacksonville, FL
March 1, 2024; 7:00 pm, ESPN+		Florida Gulf Coast	L 57–59	14–16 (5–11)	Swisher Gymnasium (902); Jacksonville, FL
ASUN tournament
March 4, 2024; 7:00 pm, ESPN+	(10)	vs. (9) Kennesaw State; First round	W 92–86	15–16	Baptist Health Arena (150); Richmond, KY
March 5, 2024; 7:00 pm, ESPN+	(10)	at (1) Eastern Kentucky; Quarterfinals	W 67–65	16–16	Baptist Health Arena (4,171); Richmond, KY
March 7, 2024; 7:00 pm, ESPN+	(10)	at (2) Stetson; Semifinals	L 87–88	16–17	Edmunds Center; DeLand, FL
*Non-conference game. ^{#}Rankings from AP Poll. (#) Tournament seedings in parentheses. All times are in Eastern.
