= Shawn Finney =

American basketball player & coach (born 1962)

Current position
- Title: Assistant coach
- Team: Stetson
- Conference: Atlantic Sun

Biographical details
- Born: September 20, 1962 (age 64)

Playing career
- 1984–1985: Fairmont State

Coaching career (HC unless noted)
- 1985–1986: Garrett College
- 1986–1987: Pikeville (assistant)
- 1987–1990: Randolph–Macon (assistant)
- 1990–1995: Tulsa (assistant)
- 1995–1997: Georgia (assistant)
- 1997–2000: Kentucky (assistant)
- 2000–2005: Tulane
- 2006–2007: Kentucky (DBO)
- 2007–2010: Marshall (assistant)
- 2010–2016: UCF (assistant)
- 2016–2018: Manhattan (assistant)
- 2018–2020: Samford (assistant)
- 2021–present: Stetson (assistant)

Head coaching record
- Overall: 60–86 (.411)

Shawn Finney (born September 20, 1962) is an American college basketball coach who is currently an assistant coach at Stetson University. He was the head coach at Tulane from 2000 to 2005, compiling a 60–86 record. He was fired on March 13, 2005.

Finney was an assistant at UCF from 2010 to 2016, helping the team to a pair of postseason appearances and three 20-win seasons. Between 2016 and 2018 Finney served as an assistant at Manhattan under Steve Masiello. In June 2018, Finney was hired at Samford as an assistant under Scott Padgett. In 2021, he was hired at Stetson as an assistant under Donnie Jones.
