= 2023–24 Queens Royals men's basketball team =

American college basketball season

2023–24 Queens Royals men's basketball
- Conference: ASUN Conference
- Record: 14–19 (7–9 ASUN)
- Head coach: Grant Leonard (2nd season)
- Assistant coaches: Charlie Wilson; Sean McClurg; Dan Bailey; Bobby Horodyski; Walt Belcher
- Home arena: Curry Arena

2023–24 ASUN men's basketball standings
	Conf.				Overall
Team	W		L	PCT	W		L	PCT
Eastern Kentucky	12	–	4	.750	17	–	14	.548
Stetson †	11	–	5	.688	22	–	13	.629
Lipscomb	11	–	5	.688	20	–	12	.625
Austin Peay	10	–	6	.625	19	–	16	.543
North Florida	9	–	7	.563	16	–	16	.500
North Alabama	8	–	8	.500	15	–	17	.469
Florida Gulf Coast	8	–	8	.500	14	–	18	.438
Queens*	7	–	9	.438	14	–	19	.424
Kennesaw State	6	–	10	.375	15	–	16	.484
Jacksonville	5	–	11	.313	16	–	17	.485
Central Arkansas	5	–	11	.313	9	–	23	.281
Bellarmine*	4	–	12	.250	8	–	23	.258
† 2024 ASUN tournament winner * ineligible for the 2024 NCAA tournament due to transition from Division II

The 2023–24 Queens Royals men's basketball team represented the Queens University of Charlotte during the 2023–24 NCAA Division I men's basketball season. The Royals, led by second-year head coach Grant Leonard, played their home games at Curry Arena in Charlotte, North Carolina as second-year members of the ASUN Conference. They finished the season 13–18, 7–9 in ASUN play, to finish in eighth place. As the No. 8 seed in the ASUN tournament, they defeated Florida Gulf Coast in the first round before losing to Stetson in the quarterfinals.

This season marked Queens' second year of a four-year transition period from Division II to Division I. As a result, the Royals are not eligible for NCAA postseason play until the 2026–27 season.

The Royals finished the season 14–19, 7–9 in ASUN play, to finish in eighth place. They defeated Florida Gulf Coast in the first round before falling to eventual tournament champions Stetson in the quarterfinals of the ASUN tournament.

== Previous season ==
The Royals finished the 2022–23 season 18–15, 7–11 in ASUN play, to finish in a tie for ninth place. As the No. 9 seed in the ASUN tournament, they defeated Florida Gulf Coast, before losing to Kennesaw State in the quarterfinals.

== Roster ==
2023–24 Queens Royals men's basketball team
Players
Coaches

Pos.	#	Name	Height	Weight	Year	Hometown
G	0	Kobe George	6 ft 3 in (1.91 m)	195 lb (88 kg)	Fr	Greensboro, NC
G/F	1	Jacobi Sebock	6 ft 6 in (1.98 m)	195 lb (88 kg)	So	Midwest City, OK
G	3	Kalib Mathews	6 ft 4 in (1.93 m)	185 lb (84 kg)	Jr	Franklinton, NC
F	4	Gavin Rains	6 ft 7 in (2.01 m)	230 lb (104 kg)	Sr	Trinity, NC
G	5	AJ McKee	6 ft 2 in (1.88 m)	200 lb (91 kg)	Jr	Charlotte, NC
F	6	BJ McLaurin	6 ft 8 in (2.03 m)	230 lb (104 kg)	Sr	Fayetteville, NC
F	8	Luke Krawczyk	6 ft 8 in (2.03 m)	225 lb (102 kg)	Fr	Fort Mill, SC
G/F	10	Bryce Cash	6 ft 5 in (1.96 m)	210 lb (95 kg)	Fr	Charlotte, NC
G	11	Chris Ashby	6 ft 2 in (1.88 m)	185 lb (84 kg)	Jr	Houston, TX
G	12	Logan Threatt	6 ft 3 in (1.91 m)	190 lb (86 kg)	Fr	Belmont, NC
G	13	Deyton Albury	6 ft 2 in (1.88 m)	190 lb (86 kg)	Jr	Nassau, Bahamas
G	15	Jordon Nevill	5 ft 11 in (1.8 m)	170 lb (77 kg)	Fr	Charlotte, NC
F	22	Jaxon Pollard	6 ft 7 in (2.01 m)	225 lb (102 kg)	Jr	Cedar Hills, UT
F	32	Malcolm Wilson	7 ft 0 in (2.13 m)	215 lb (98 kg)	Sr	Columbia, SC

Head coach

- Grant Leonard (William Penn)

Assistant coach(es)

- Charlie Wilson (Central Methodist)
- Sean McClurg (Virginia Tech)
- Dan Bailey (Queens (NC))
- Bobby Horodyski (Central Florida)
- Walt Belcher (Missouri Valley)

Legend

- (C) Team captain
- (S) Suspended
- (I) Ineligible
- (W) Walk-on
- Injured
- Current redshirt

Roster
Last update: November 14, 2023

== Schedule and results ==
Date time, TV	Rank^{#}	Opponent^{#}	Result	Record	Site (attendance) city, state
Non-conference regular season
November 6, 2023*; 7:00 p.m., ESPN+		at Marshall	L 73–89	0–1	Cam Henderson Center (4,443); Huntington, WV
November 10, 2023*; 8:00 p.m., ESPN+		at Southern Illinois	L 68–91	0–2	Banterra Center (5,183); Carbondale, IL
November 14, 2023*; 7:00 p.m., ESPN+		High Point	W 74–72	1–2	Curry Arena (873); Charlotte, NC
November 18, 2023*; 6:00 p.m., ESPN+		vs. Fairfield; Market Street Challenge	W 69–63	2–2	Daskalakis Athletic Center (338); Philadelphia, PA
November 19, 2023*; 2:00 p.m., FloSports		at Drexel; Market Street Challenge	L 52–62	2–3	Daskalakis Athletic Center (871); Philadelphia, PA
November 22, 2023*; 7:00 p.m., ESPN+		Fairleigh Dickinson	W 97–84	3–3	Curry Arena (317); Charlotte, NC
November 25, 2023*; 6:00 p.m., ESPN+		at Richmond	L 61–90	3–4	Robins Center (4,953); Richmond, VA
November 29, 2023*; 7:00 p.m., ESPN+		Gardner–Webb	W 83–80	4–4	Curry Arena (381); Charlotte, NC
December 1, 2023*; 12:00 p.m., ESPN+		Carolina Christian	W 134–69	5–4	Curry Arena (556); Charlotte, NC
December 5, 2023*; 6:30 p.m., ESPN+		at Winthrop	L 82–88	5–5	Winthrop Coliseum (1,279); Rock Hill, SC
December 9, 2023*; 1:00 p.m., ESPN+		Carolina	W 112–64	6–5	Curry Arena (300); Charlotte, NC
December 13, 2023*; 7:00 p.m., ESPN+		Appalachian State	L 81–93	6–6	Curry Arena (1,532); Charlotte, NC
December 19, 2023*; 7:00 p.m., ESPN+		at Mercer	L 65–84	6–7	Hawkins Arena (839); Macon, GA
December 22, 2023*; 6:00 p.m., ACCN		at No. 18 Clemson	L 79–109	6–8	Littlejohn Coliseum (6,817); Clemson, SC
December 30, 2023*; 2:00 p.m., The CW		at No. 16 Duke	L 69–106	6–9	Cameron Indoor Stadium (9,314); Durham, NC
ASUN regular season
January 6, 2024; 5:00 p.m., ESPN+		at Kennesaw State	L 77–80	6–10 (0–1)	KSU Convocation Center (1,921); Kennesaw, GA
January 10, 2024; 7:00 p.m., ESPN+		Florida Gulf Coast	W 78–75	7–10 (1–1)	Curry Arena (395); Charlotte, NC
January 12, 2024; 7:00 p.m., ESPN+		Stetson	L 66–84	7–11 (1–2)	Curry Arena (455); Charlotte, NC
January 18, 2024; 7:00 p.m., ESPN+		at Jacksonville	L 77–79	7–12 (1–3)	Swisher Gymnasium (873); Jacksonville, FL
January 20, 2024; 5:00 p.m., ESPN+		at North Florida	L 75–91	7–13 (1–4)	UNF Arena (1,559); Jacksonville, FL
January 24, 2024; 7:00 p.m., ESPN+		Central Arkansas	W 96–79	8–13 (2–4)	Curry Arena (226); Charlotte, NC
January 27, 2024; 7:00 p.m., ESPN+		at North Alabama	L 84–90	8–14 (2–5)	CB&S Bank Arena (1,473); Florence, AL
February 1, 2024; 8:00 p.m., ESPN+		Eastern Kentucky	W 94–76	9–14 (3–5)	Curry Arena (317); Charlotte, NC
February 3, 2024; 4:00 p.m., ESPN+		Bellarmine	W 85–75	10–14 (4–5)	Curry Arena (773); Charlotte, NC
February 8, 2024; 8:00 p.m., ESPN+		at Lipscomb	L 88–90	10–15 (4–6)	Allen Arena (1,582); Nashville, TN
February 10, 2024; 5:15 p.m., ESPN+		at Austin Peay	L 76–79	10–16 (4–7)	F&M Bank Arena (3,333); Clarksville, TN
February 14, 2024; 7:00 p.m., ESPN+		North Florida	L 79–93	10–17 (4–8)	Curry Arena (101); Charlotte, NC
February 16, 2024; 7:00 p.m., ESPN+		Jacksonville	W 74–65	11–17 (5–8)	Curry Arena (326); Charlotte, NC
February 22, 2024; 7:00 p.m., ESPN+		at Stetson	W 83–77	12–17 (6–8)	Edmunds Center (441); DeLand, FL
February 24, 2024; 7:00 p.m., ESPN+		at Florida Gulf Coast	L 81–90	12–18 (6–9)	Alico Arena (2,354); Fort Myers, FL
March 1, 2024; 7:00 p.m., ESPN+		Kennesaw State	W 91–82	13–18 (7–9)	Curry Arena (344); Charlotte, NC
ASUN tournament
March 4, 2024; 7:00 p.m., ESPN+	(8)	vs. (7) Florida Gulf Coast; First round	W 69–63	14–18	Edmunds Center (108); DeLand, FL
March 5, 2024; 7:00 p.m., ESPN+	(8)	at (2) Stetson; Quarterfinals	L 71–83	14–19	Edmunds Center (672); DeLand, FL
*Non-conference game. ^{#}Rankings from AP poll. (#) Tournament seedings in parentheses. All times are in Eastern.
