= 2023–24 Austin Peay Governors men's basketball team =

American college basketball season

2023–24 Austin Peay Governors men's basketball

CIT, Quarterfinals
- Conference: Atlantic Sun Conference
- Record: 19–16 (10–6 ASUN)
- Head coach: Corey Gipson (1st season)
- Associate head coach: Rodney Hamilton
- Assistant coaches: Tim Ward; Jimmy Lincoln
- Home arena: F&M Bank Arena

2023–24 ASUN men's basketball standings
	Conf.				Overall
Team	W		L	PCT	W		L	PCT
Eastern Kentucky	12	–	4	.750	17	–	14	.548
Stetson †	11	–	5	.688	22	–	13	.629
Lipscomb	11	–	5	.688	20	–	12	.625
Austin Peay	10	–	6	.625	19	–	16	.543
North Florida	9	–	7	.563	16	–	16	.500
North Alabama	8	–	8	.500	15	–	17	.469
Florida Gulf Coast	8	–	8	.500	14	–	18	.438
Queens*	7	–	9	.438	14	–	19	.424
Kennesaw State	6	–	10	.375	15	–	16	.484
Jacksonville	5	–	11	.313	16	–	17	.485
Central Arkansas	5	–	11	.313	9	–	23	.281
Bellarmine*	4	–	12	.250	8	–	23	.258
† 2024 ASUN tournament winner * ineligible for the 2024 NCAA tournament due to transition from Division II

The 2023–24 Austin Peay Governors men's basketball team represented Austin Peay State University during the 2023–24 NCAA Division I men's basketball season. The Governors, led by first-year head coach Corey Gipson, played their home games at the newly opened F&M Bank Arena located in Clarksville, Tennessee as second-year members of the Atlantic Sun Conference (ASUN).

== Previous season ==
The Governors finished the 2022–23 season 9–22, 3–15 in ASUN play to finish in last place. They failed to qualify for the ASUN tournament.

On March 5, 2023, the school fired head coach Nate James. On March 13, the school named Northwestern State head coach Corey Gipson the team's new head coach.

== Roster ==
2023–24 Austin Peay Governors men's basketball team
Players
Coaches

Pos.	#	Name	Height	Weight	Year	Hometown
G	0	DeMarcus Sharp	6 ft 3 in (1.91 m)	170 lb (77 kg)	GS	Charleston, Missouri
F	1	Sai Witt	6 ft 8 in (2.03 m)	230 lb (104 kg)	GS	Kansas City, Missouri
G	2	Dez White	6 ft 2 in (1.88 m)	176 lb (80 kg)	Fr	Jefferson City, Missouri
G	3	Isaac Haney	6 ft 2 in (1.88 m)	192 lb (87 kg)	Jr	West Plains, Missouri
G	4	Ja'Monta Black	6 ft 4 in (1.93 m)	192 lb (87 kg)	GS	Columbia, Missouri
F	6	Daniel Loos	6 ft 6 in (1.98 m)	219 lb (99 kg)	Sr	Clarksville, Tennessee
F	8	Jalen Ware	6 ft 8 in (2.03 m)	189 lb (86 kg)	RS Jr	Winston-Salem, North Carolina
G	10	Harrison Black	5 ft 8 in (1.73 m)	150 lb (68 kg)	Jr	Houston, Texas
G	11	Dezi Jones	5 ft 10 in (1.78 m)	165 lb (75 kg)	GS	Hannibal, Missouri
G	12	Anton Brookshire	6 ft 2 in (1.88 m)	176 lb (80 kg)	Jr	Milwaukee, Wisconsin
F	14	Jonathan Dunn	6 ft 7 in (2.01 m)	192 lb (87 kg)	So	Florissant, Missouri
G	24	Hansel Enmanuel	6 ft 6 in (1.98 m)	167 lb (76 kg)	So	Los Mina, Dominican Republic
C	32	Jordan Wilmore	7 ft 3 in (2.21 m)	352 lb (160 kg)	Sr	Memphis, Tennessee

Head coach

- Corey Gipson (Austin Peay)

Assistant coach(es)

- Rodney Hamilton (Georgia State)
- Tim Ward (Central Methodist)
- Jimmy Lincoln (Southwest Baptist)

Legend

- (C) Team captain
- (S) Suspended
- (I) Ineligible
- (W) Walk-on
- Injured
- Current redshirt

Roster
Last update: November 12, 2023

== Schedule and results ==
Date time, TV	Rank^{#}	Opponent^{#}	Result	Record	Site (attendance) city, state
Exhibition
November 1, 2023*; 7:00 pm		Tennessee Tech; Charity Exhibition	W 82–43	–	F&M Bank Arena (1,121); Clarksville, TN
Non-conference regular season
November 6, 2023*; 7:15 pm, ESPN+		Life	W 90–72	1–0	F&M Bank Arena (2,013); Clarksville, TN
November 10, 2023*; 6:00 pm, ESPN+		at George Mason	L 45–67	1–1	EagleBank Arena (4,295); Fairfax, VA
November 14, 2023*; 7:00 pm, ESPN+		Fisk	W 79–52	2–1	F&M Bank Arena (1,051); Clarksville, TN
November 17, 2023*; 8:00 pm, ESPN+		at UTEP; SoCal Challenge campus site game	L 63–71	2–2	Don Haskins Center (4,871); El Paso, TX
November 20, 2023*; 5:30 pm, FloHoops		vs. Tarleton State; SoCal Challenge Sand Division semifinals	L 59–66	2–3	The Pavilion at JSerra (113); San Juan Capistrano, CA
November 22, 2023*; 2:00 pm, FloHoops		vs. Sacramento State; SoCal Challenge Sand Division 3rd place game	W 74–71	3–3	The Pavilion at JSerra (224); San Juan Capistrano, CA
November 26, 2023*; 12:30 pm, ESPN+		at Appalachian State	L 58–78	3–4	Holmes Center (1,298); Boone, NC
November 29, 2023*; 7:00 pm, ESPN+		Morehead State	L 50–61	3–5	F&M Bank Arena (1,003); Clarksville, TN
December 2, 2023*; 6:00 pm, ESPN+		at Tennessee State	L 65–69	3–6	Gentry Complex (4,564); Nashville, TN
December 5, 2023*; 7:00 pm, ESPN+		Midway	W 98–44	4–6	F&M Bank Arena (1,067); Clarksville, TN
December 9, 2023*; 6:15 pm, ESPN+		Murray State	W 53–49	5–6	F&M Bank Arena (5,808); Clarksville, TN
December 12, 2023*; 7:00 pm, ESPN+		at Southern Illinois	W 70–68	6–6	Banterra Center (4,463); Carbondale, IL
December 16, 2023*; 2:00 pm, ESPN+		at Western Kentucky	L 64–65	6–7	E. A. Diddle Arena (3,109); Bowling Green, KY
December 22, 2023*; 7:00 pm, ESPN+		Ohio	W 71–67	7–7	F&M Bank Arena (3,031); Clarksville, TN
December 30, 2023*; 6:00 pm, ESPN+		at No. 19 Memphis	L 70–81	7–8	FedExForum (12,018); Memphis, TN
ASUN regular season
January 4, 2024; 5:30 pm, ESPN+		at Bellarmine	W 84–68	8–8 (1–0)	Freedom Hall (2,749); Louisville, KY
January 6, 2024; 6:00 pm, ESPN+		at Eastern Kentucky	L 59–69	8–9 (1–1)	Baptist Health Arena (3,153); Richmond, KY
January 13, 2024; 4:00 pm, ESPN+		at Lipscomb	L 77–91	8–10 (1–2)	Allen Arena (2,082); Nashville, TN
January 18, 2024; 7:00 pm, ESPN+		North Alabama	W 83–80 ^{OT}	9–10 (2–2)	F&M Bank Arena (2,914); Clarksville, TN
January 20, 2024; 4:15 pm, ESPN+		Central Arkansas	W 94–71	10–10 (3–2)	F&M Bank Arena (4,313); Clarksville, TN
January 25, 2024; 6:00 pm, ESPN+		at Stetson	L 82–83	10–11 (3–3)	Edmunds Center (939); DeLand, FL
January 27, 2024; 6:00 pm, ESPN+		at Florida Gulf Coast	L 67–73	10–12 (3–4)	Alico Arena (2,034); Fort Myers, FL
January 31, 2024; 6:00 pm, ESPN+		at Jacksonville	L 43–63	10–13 (3–5)	Swisher Gymnasium (791); Jacksonville, FL
February 3, 2024; 4:15 pm, ESPN+		North Florida	W 95–91 ^{2OT}	11–13 (4–5)	F&M Bank Arena (3,312); Clarksville, TN
February 8, 2024; 7:00 pm, ESPN+		Kennesaw State	W 85–69	12–13 (5–5)	F&M Bank Arena (2,032); Clarksville, TN
February 10, 2024; 4:15 pm, ESPN+		Queens	W 79–76	13–13 (6–5)	F&M Bank Arena (3,333); Clarksville, TN
February 15, 2024; 7:30 pm, ESPN+		at Central Arkansas	W 77–67	14–13 (7–5)	Farris Center (1,025); Conway, AR
February 17, 2024; 7:15 pm, ESPN+		at North Alabama	W 87–79	15–13 (8–5)	CB&S Bank Arena (1,990); Florence, AL
February 24, 2024; 4:15 pm, ESPN+		Lipscomb	L 85–90	15–14 (8–6)	F&M Bank Arena (5,681); Clarksville, TN
February 28, 2024; 7:00 pm, ESPN+		Eastern Kentucky	W 83–79	16–14 (9–6)	F&M Bank Arena (2,297); Clarksville, TN
March 1, 2024; 7:00 pm, ESPN+		Bellarmine	W 90–87 ^{OT}	17–14 (10–6)	F&M Bank Arena (2,681); Clarksville, TN
ASUN tournament
March 5, 2024; 7:00 pm, ESPN+	(4)	(5) North Florida; Quarterfinals	W 101–98 ^{OT}	18–14	F&M Bank Arena (2,211); Clarksville, TN
March 7, 2024; 7:00 pm, ESPN+	(4)	(6) North Alabama; Semifinals	W 77–71	19–14	F&M Bank Arena (3,215); Clarksville, TN
March 10, 2024; 2:00 pm, ESPN2	(4)	at (2) Stetson; Championship	L 91–94	19–15	Edmunds Center (2,328); DeLand, FL
CIT
March 20, 2024*; 7:00 pm, ESPN+		Alabama A&M; Quarterfinals - Hugh Durham Classic	L 71–81	19–16	F&M Bank Arena (1,386); Clarksville, TN
*Non-conference game. ^{#}Rankings from AP Poll. (#) Tournament seedings in parentheses. All times are in Central.
