= 2023–24 Eastern Kentucky Colonels men's basketball team =

American college basketball season

2023–24 Eastern Kentucky Colonels men's basketball

ASUN regular season champions
- Conference: Atlantic Sun Conference
- Record: 17–14 (12–4 ASUN)
- Head coach: A. W. Hamilton (6th season)
- Assistant coaches: Mike Allen; Steve Lepore; Ambrose Mosley
- Home arena: Baptist Health Arena

2023–24 ASUN men's basketball standings
	Conf.				Overall
Team	W		L	PCT	W		L	PCT
Eastern Kentucky	12	–	4	.750	17	–	14	.548
Stetson †	11	–	5	.688	22	–	13	.629
Lipscomb	11	–	5	.688	20	–	12	.625
Austin Peay	10	–	6	.625	19	–	16	.543
North Florida	9	–	7	.563	16	–	16	.500
North Alabama	8	–	8	.500	15	–	17	.469
Florida Gulf Coast	8	–	8	.500	14	–	18	.438
Queens*	7	–	9	.438	14	–	19	.424
Kennesaw State	6	–	10	.375	15	–	16	.484
Jacksonville	5	–	11	.313	16	–	17	.485
Central Arkansas	5	–	11	.313	9	–	23	.281
Bellarmine*	4	–	12	.250	8	–	23	.258
† 2024 ASUN tournament winner * ineligible for the 2024 NCAA tournament due to transition from Division II

The 2023–24 Eastern Kentucky Colonels men's basketball team represented Eastern Kentucky University in the 2023–24 NCAA Division I men's basketball season. The Colonels, led by sixth-year head coach A. W. Hamilton, played their home games at Baptist Health Arena in Richmond, Kentucky as members of the Atlantic Sun Conference (ASUN).

== Previous season ==
The Colonels finished the 2022–23 season 19–12, 12–6 in ASUN play to finish in a third place tie. In the ASUN tournament, they were defeated by Liberty in the second round. The Colonels were runners up in the 2023 College Basketball Invitational, losing to Charlotte in the championship game.

== Roster ==
2023–24 Eastern Kentucky Colonels men's basketball team
Players
Coaches

Pos.	#	Name	Height	Weight	Year	Hometown
G	0	Turner Buttry	5 ft 11 in (1.8 m)	165 lb (75 kg)	So	Bowling Green, Kentucky
G	1	Tayshawn Comer	6 ft 1 in (1.85 m)	190 lb (86 kg)	So	Indianapolis, Indiana
G	2	Leland Walker	6 ft 1 in (1.85 m)	185 lb (84 kg)	So	Indianapolis, Indiana
G	3	DaShawn Jackson	6 ft 3 in (1.91 m)	196 lb (89 kg)	Jr	Lexington, Kentucky
G	4	Collin Cooper	6 ft 2 in (1.88 m)	190 lb (86 kg)	Sr	Fayetteville, Arkansas
G/F	10	Devontae Blanton	6 ft 6 in (1.98 m)	214 lb (97 kg)	Sr	Macedonia, Ohio
G	11	Jackson Holt	6 ft 4 in (1.93 m)	185 lb (84 kg)	So	Cincinnati, Ohio
F	12	Robby Todd	6 ft 7 in (2.01 m)	220 lb (100 kg)	Fr	Richmond, Kentucky
F	14	John Ukomadu	6 ft 7 in (2.01 m)	195 lb (88 kg)	Sr	Southfield, Michigan
F	15	Montavious Myrick	6 ft 8 in (2.03 m)	208 lb (94 kg)	Jr	Atlanta, Georgia
C	21	David Onanina	6 ft 8 in (2.03 m)	230 lb (104 kg)	RS Fr	Yaoundé, Cameroon
G/F	22	Pierce Thomas	6 ft 5 in (1.96 m)	210 lb (95 kg)	RS So	Brownsburg, Indiana
F	24	Michael Moreno	6 ft 7 in (2.01 m)	225 lb (102 kg)	Sr	Georgetown, Kentucky
G	25	Bryson Perry	5 ft 9 in (1.75 m)	158 lb (72 kg)	RS So	Richmond, Kentucky
G	30	Jax Allen	6 ft 3 in (1.91 m)	195 lb (88 kg)	Fr	Edmonton, Kentucky
F	50	Isaiah Cozart	6 ft 7 in (2.01 m)	240 lb (109 kg)	Sr	Richmond, Kentucky

Head coach

- A. W. Hamilton (Marshall)

Assistant coach(es)

- Mike Allen (Ohio)
- Steve Lepore (Wake Forest)
- Ambrose Mosley (Old Dominion)

Legend

- (C) Team captain
- (S) Suspended
- (I) Ineligible
- (W) Walk-on
- Injured
- Current redshirt

Roster
Last update: November 9, 2023

== Schedule and results ==
Date time, TV	Rank^{#}	Opponent^{#}	Result	Record	Site (attendance) city, state
Exhibition
October 30, 2023*; 6:30 pm		at Georgia	L 82–99		Stegeman Coliseum; Athens, GA
Regular season
November 7, 2023*; 7:00 pm, ESPN+		West Virginia Tech	W 108–72	1–0	Baptist Health Arena (2,692); Richmond, KY
November 10, 2023*; 7:00 pm, ESPN+		Wilberforce	W 133–75	2–0	Baptist Health Arena (1,500); Richmond, KY
November 17, 2023*; 7:00 pm, ESPN+		UT Martin; Eastern Kentucky MTE	L 74–80	2–1	Baptist Health Arena (2,459); Richmond, KY
November 21, 2023*; 12:00 pm, ESPN+		Prairie View A&M; Eastern Kentucky MTE	L 64–76	2–2	Baptist Health Arena (5,631); Richmond, KY
November 27, 2023*; 7:00 pm, ESPN+		Troy	W 77–76	3–2	Baptist Health Arena (1,894); Richmond, KY
December 3, 2023*; 5:00 pm, ESPN+		at Western Kentucky	L 69–79	3–3	E. A. Diddle Arena (3,511); Bowling Green, KY
December 7, 2023*; 7:00 pm		at UNC Greensboro	L 85–87 ^{OT}	3–4	Fleming Gymnasium (697); Greensboro, NC
December 10, 2023*; 4:00 pm, ESPN+		Bethany (WV)	W 121–56	4–4	Baptist Health Arena (1,347); Richmond, KY
December 13, 2023*; 8:30 pm, ESPN+		at Louisiana	L 62–73	4–5	Cajundome (1,417); Lafayette, LA
December 17, 2023*; 4:00 pm, ESPN+		Northern Kentucky	L 75–85	4–6	Baptist Health Arena (3,046); Richmond, KY
December 21, 2023*; 7:00 pm, ESPN+		at Troy	L 81–88	4–7	Trojan Arena (1,962); Troy, AL
December 23, 2023*; 4:00 pm, SECN		at Alabama	L 67–111	4–8	Coleman Coliseum (9,950); Tuscaloosa, AL
December 29, 2023*; 7:00 pm, BTN		at No. 1 Purdue	L 53–80	4–9	Mackey Arena (14,876); West Lafayette, IN
January 4, 2024; 7:00 pm, ESPN+		Lipscomb	W 80–72	5–9 (1–0)	Baptist Health Arena (2,476); Richmond, KY
January 6, 2024; 7:00 pm, ESPN+		Austin Peay	W 69–59	6–9 (2–0)	Baptist Health Arena (3,153); Richmond, KY
January 11, 2024; 8:30 pm, ESPN+		at Central Arkansas	W 86–63	7–9 (3–0)	Farris Center (1,245); Conway, AR
January 13, 2024; 8:15 pm, ESPN+		at North Alabama	W 81–72	8–9 (4–0)	Flowers Hall (1,738); Florence, AL
January 20, 2024; 7:00 pm, ESPN+		Bellarmine	W 82–70	9–9 (5–0)	Baptist Health Arena (3,672); Richmond, KY
January 25, 2024; 7:00 pm, ESPN+		Jacksonville	W 75–59	10–9 (6–0)	Baptist Health Arena (3,196); Richmond, KY
January 27, 2024; 4:00 pm, ESPN+		North Florida	W 89–76	11–9 (7–0)	Baptist Health Arena (4,278); Richmond, KY
February 1, 2024; 8:00 pm, ESPN+		at Queens	L 76–94	11–10 (7–1)	Curry Arena (317); Charlotte, NC
February 3, 2024; 5:00 pm, ESPN+		at Kennesaw State	W 86–76	12–10 (8–1)	KSU Convocation Center (2,357); Kennesaw, GA
February 7, 2024; 9:00 pm, ESPN+		Florida Gulf Coast	W 90–82	13–10 (9–1)	Baptist Health Arena (4,066); Richmond, KY
February 10, 2024; 4:45 pm, ESPN+		at Stetson	L 79–87	13–11 (9–2)	Edmunds Center (882); DeLand, FL
February 14, 2024*; 7:00 pm, ESPN+		Chicago State	W 86–73	14–11	Baptist Health Arena (2,391); Richmond, KY
February 17, 2024; 7:00 pm, ESPN+		at Bellarmine	W 75–65	15–11 (10–2)	Freedom Hall (2,196); Louisville, KY
February 22, 2024; 7:00 pm, ESPN+		North Alabama	W 75–72	16–11 (11–2)	Baptist Health Arena (2,755); Richmond, KY
February 24, 2024; 1:00 pm, ESPN+		Central Arkansas	W 95–82	17–11 (12–2)	Baptist Health Arena (3,698); Richmond, KY
February 28, 2024; 8:00 pm, ESPN+		at Austin Peay	L 79–83	17–12 (12–3)	F&M Bank Arena (2,297); Clarksville, TN
March 1, 2024; 8:00 pm, ESPN+		at Lipscomb	L 67–81	17–13 (12–4)	Allen Arena (2,026); Nashville, TN
ASUN tournament
March 5, 2024; 7:00 pm, ESPN+	(1)	(10) Jacksonville; Quarterfinals	L 65–67	17–14	Baptist Health Arena (4,171); Richmond, KY
*Non-conference game. ^{#}Rankings from AP Poll. (#) Tournament seedings in parentheses. All times are in Eastern.
