= 2023–24 Florida Gulf Coast Eagles men's basketball team =

Basketball team season

2023–24 Florida Gulf Coast Eagles men's basketball
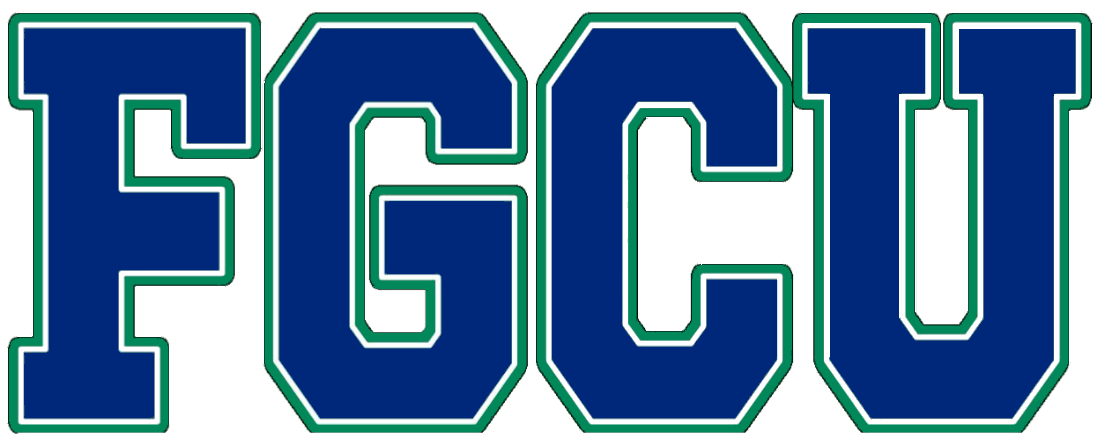
- Conference: ASUN Conference
- Record: 14–18 (8–8 ASUN)
- Head coach: Pat Chambers (2nd season)
- Associate head coach: Kyle Griffin
- Assistant coaches: Andrew Francis; Kevin Hudash; David Caporaletti; Rick Alexandre
- Home arena: Alico Arena

2023–24 ASUN men's basketball standings
	Conf.				Overall
Team	W		L	PCT	W		L	PCT
Eastern Kentucky	12	–	4	.750	17	–	14	.548
Stetson †	11	–	5	.688	22	–	13	.629
Lipscomb	11	–	5	.688	20	–	12	.625
Austin Peay	10	–	6	.625	19	–	16	.543
North Florida	9	–	7	.563	16	–	16	.500
North Alabama	8	–	8	.500	15	–	17	.469
Florida Gulf Coast	8	–	8	.500	14	–	18	.438
Queens*	7	–	9	.438	14	–	19	.424
Kennesaw State	6	–	10	.375	15	–	16	.484
Jacksonville	5	–	11	.313	16	–	17	.485
Central Arkansas	5	–	11	.313	9	–	23	.281
Bellarmine*	4	–	12	.250	8	–	23	.258
† 2024 ASUN tournament winner * ineligible for the 2024 NCAA tournament due to transition from Division II

The 2023–24 Florida Gulf Coast Eagles men's basketball team represented Florida Gulf Coast University during the 2023–24 NCAA Division I men's basketball season. The Eagles, led by second-year head coach Pat Chambers, played their home games at Alico Arena in Fort Myers, Florida as members of the ASUN Conference. They finished the season 14–17, 8–8 in ASUN play, to finish in a tie for sixth place. As the No. 7 seed in the ASUN tournament, they lost to Queens in the first round.

== Previous season ==
The Eagles finished the 2022–23 season 17–15, 7–11 in ASUN play, to finish in a tie for ninth place. In the first round of the ASUN tournament, they were defeated by Queens.

== Roster ==
2023–24 Florida Gulf Coast Eagles men's basketball team
Players
Coaches

Pos.	#	Name	Height	Weight	Year	Previous school	Hometown
F	0	Dakota Rivers	6 ft 8 in (2.03 m)	208 lb (94 kg)	Sr	Windermere High School	Windermere, FL
G	1	Rahmir Barno	6 ft 0 in (1.83 m)	155 lb (70 kg)	Fr	Imhotep Charter High School	Philadelphia, PA
C	3	Andre Weir	6 ft 10 in (2.08 m)	265 lb (120 kg)	RS Jr	Richmond	Hollywood, FL
G	4	Cyrus Largie	6 ft 3 in (1.91 m)	204 lb (93 kg)	Sr	Mater Lakes Academy	Miramar, FL
G	5	Xavier Pina	6 ft 3 in (1.91 m)	175 lb (79 kg)	Jr	Navarro College	Woodbury, NJ
F	10	Zach Anderson	6 ft 7 in (2.01 m)	205 lb (93 kg)	Jr	Apopka High School	Apopka, FL
G	11	Isaiah Thompson	6 ft 1 in (1.85 m)	160 lb (73 kg)	Sr	Purdue	Zionsville, IN
G	12	Franco Miller Jr.	6 ft 3 in (1.91 m)	201 lb (91 kg)	GS	Ole Miss	Freeport, Bahamas
F	15	Blaise Vespe	6 ft 7 in (2.01 m)	220 lb (100 kg)	So	IMG Academy	Cherry Hill, NJ
G	23	Dallion Johnson	6 ft 3 in (1.91 m)	185 lb (84 kg)	Jr	Phillips Academy	Boston, MA
F	24	Josiah Shackleford	6 ft 9 in (2.06 m)	225 lb (102 kg)	Jr	Brunswick Community College	Greenville, NC
G	1	Brandon Dwyer	6 ft 3 in (1.91 m)	180 lb (82 kg)	Jr	La Salle	Newark, DE
F	32	Keeshawn Kellman	6 ft 8 in (2.03 m)	225 lb (102 kg)	Sr	Perkiomen School	Allentown, PA
F	44	Kyle Riemenschneider	6 ft 5 in (1.96 m)	205 lb (93 kg)	Sr	Fort Myers High School	Fort Myers, FL
G	55	Chase Johnston	6 ft 3 in (1.91 m)	185 lb (84 kg)	Sr	Stetson	Boca Raton, FL

Head coach

- Pat Chambers (Philadelphia)

Assistant coach(es)

- Kyle Griffin (Siena)
- Andrew Francis (Villanova)
- Kevin Hudash (Penn State)
- David Caporaletti (Philadelphia)
- Rick Alexandre

Legend

- (C) Team captain
- (S) Suspended
- (I) Ineligible
- (W) Walk-on
- Injured
- Current redshirt

Roster
Last update: October 27, 2023

== Schedule and results ==
Date time, TV	Rank^{#}	Opponent^{#}	Result	Record	Site (attendance) city, state
Non-conference regular season
November 7, 2023*; 6:30 p.m., BTN		at Indiana	L 63–69	0–1	Simon Skjodt Assembly Hall (17,222); Bloomington, IN
November 10, 2023*; 7:00 p.m., ESPN+		Ave Maria	W 80–71	1–1	Alico Arena (2,533); Fort Myers, FL
November 13, 2023*; 7:00 p.m., ACCN		at Pittsburgh	L 74–86	1–2	Petersen Events Center (6,567); Pittsburgh, PA
November 17, 2023*; 9:00 p.m., ESPN+		vs. Missouri State; Paradise Jam first round	L 61–70	1–3	Sports and Fitness Center (724); St. Thomas, USVI
November 18, 2023*; 5:45 p.m., ESPN+		vs. Hampton; Paradise Jam consolation 2nd round	L 85–92	1–4	Sports and Fitness Center (1,024); St. Thomas, USVI
November 20, 2023*; 2:00 p.m., ESPN+		vs. Norfolk State; Paradise Jam 7th-place game	L 66–69	1–5	Sports and Fitness Center; St. Thomas, USVI
November 25, 2023*; 4:30 p.m., ESPN+		UNC Wilmington	L 55–71	1–6	Alico Arena (1,551); Fort Myers, FL
November 29, 2023*; 7:00 p.m., CBSSN		at FIU	W 68–64	2–6	Ocean Bank Convocation Center (1,365); Miami, FL
December 3, 2023*; 1:00 p.m., ESPN+		at Cincinnati	L 62–99	2–7	Fifth Third Arena (9,812); Cincinnati, OH
December 5, 2023*; 7:00 p.m., ESPN+		New College of Florida	W 87–54	3–7	Alico Arena (1,649); Fort Myers, FL
December 9, 2023*; 12:00 p.m., BTN		at Minnesota	L 57–77	3–8	Williams Arena (7,317); Minneapolis, MN
December 16, 2023*; 2:00 p.m., ESPN+		at Mercer	L 65–70	3–9	Hawkins Arena (1,009); Macon, GA
December 19, 2023*; 6:00 p.m.		vs. Georgia Southern	W 53–42	4–9	Enmarket Arena (706); Savannah, GA
December 22, 2023*; 7:00 p.m., ESPN+		Florida Memorial	W 78–75 ^{OT}	5–9	Alico Arena (1,424); Fort Myers, FL
December 30, 2023*; 7:00 p.m., ESPN+		No. 7 Florida Atlantic	W 72–68	6–9	Alico Arena (4,633); Fort Myers, FL
ASUN regular season
January 4, 2024; 7:00 p.m., ESPN+		Jacksonville	W 80–70	7–9 (1–0)	Alico Arena (2,036); Fort Myers, FL
January 6, 2024; 7:00 p.m., ESPN+		North Florida	L 58–78	7–10 (1–1)	Alico Arena (2,272); Fort Myers, FL
January 10, 2024; 7:00 p.m., ESPN+		at Queens	L 75–78	7–11 (1–2)	Curry Arena (395); Charlotte, NC
January 12, 2024; 7:00 p.m., ESPN+		at Kennesaw State	L 75–78	7–12 (1–3)	KSU Convocation Center; Kennesaw, GA
January 20, 2024; 7:00 p.m., ESPN+		Stetson	W 80–56	8–12 (2–3)	Alico Arena (2,634); Fort Myers, FL
January 25, 2024; 7:00 p.m., ESPN+		Lipscomb	L 72–98	8–13 (2–4)	Alico Arena (1,805); Fort Myers, FL
January 27, 2024; 7:00 p.m., ESPN+		Austin Peay	W 73–67	9–13 (3–4)	Alico Arena (2,034); Fort Myers, FL
February 1, 2024; 8:30 p.m., ESPN+		at Central Arkansas	W 82–59	10–13 (4–4)	Farris Center (895); Conway, AR
February 3, 2024; 8:15 p.m., ESPN+		at North Alabama	L 69–70	10–14 (4–5)	CB&S Bank Arena (1,484); Florence, AL
February 7, 2024; 9:00 p.m., ESPN+		at Eastern Kentucky	L 82–90	10–15 (4–6)	Baptist Health Arena (4,066); Richmond, KY
February 10, 2024; 7:00 p.m., ESPN+		Bellarmine	W 63–52	11–15 (5–6)	Alico Arena (2,612); Fort Myers, FL
February 17, 2024; 2:00 p.m., ESPN+		at Stetson	L 60–61	11–16 (5–7)	Edmunds Center (892); DeLand, FL
February 22, 2024; 7:00 p.m., ESPN+		Kennesaw State	L 67–74	11–17 (5–8)	Alico Arena (2,123); Fort Myers, FL
February 24, 2024; 7:00 p.m., ESPN+		Queens	W 90–81	12–17 (6–8)	Alico Arena (2,354); Fort Myers, FL
February 28, 2024; 7:00 p.m., ESPN+		at North Florida	W 79–60	13–17 (7–8)	UNF Arena (1,755); Jacksonville, FL
March 1, 2024; 7:00 p.m., ESPN+		at Jacksonville	W 59–57	14–17 (8–8)	Swisher Gymnasium (902); Jacksonville, FL
ASUN tournament
March 4, 2024; 7:00 p.m., ESPN+	(7)	vs. (8) Queens; First round	L 63–69	14–18	Edmunds Center (108); DeLand, FL
*Non-conference game. ^{#}Rankings from AP poll. (#) Tournament seedings in parentheses. All times are in Eastern.
