= 2024 Atlantic Sun men's basketball tournament =

American college basketball postseason tournament

- Classification: Division I
- Season: 2023–24
- Teams: 10
- Site: Campus sites
- Champions: Stetson (1st title)
- Winning coach: Donnie Jones (1st title)
- Attendance: 15,813 (total); 2,328 (final)
- Television: ESPN+, ESPN2

2023–24 ASUN men's basketball standings
	Conf.				Overall
Team	W		L	PCT	W		L	PCT
Eastern Kentucky	12	–	4	.750	17	–	14	.548
Stetson †	11	–	5	.688	22	–	13	.629
Lipscomb	11	–	5	.688	20	–	12	.625
Austin Peay	10	–	6	.625	19	–	16	.543
North Florida	9	–	7	.563	16	–	16	.500
North Alabama	8	–	8	.500	15	–	17	.469
Florida Gulf Coast	8	–	8	.500	14	–	18	.438
Queens*	7	–	9	.438	14	–	19	.424
Kennesaw State	6	–	10	.375	15	–	16	.484
Jacksonville	5	–	11	.313	16	–	17	.485
Central Arkansas	5	–	11	.313	9	–	23	.281
Bellarmine*	4	–	12	.250	8	–	23	.258
† 2024 ASUN tournament winner * ineligible for the 2024 NCAA tournament due to transition from Division II

The 2024 Atlantic Sun men's basketball tournament was the conference postseason tournament for the Atlantic Sun Conference. The tournament was the 45th year the league has conducted a postseason tournament. The tournament was held March 4–10 at campus sites of the higher seeds. The winner, Stetson, received the conference's automatic bid to the 2024 NCAA Tournament. It was their first ever ASUN championship and NCAA tournament appearance for the Hatters.

== Seeds ==
Ten teams contested the bracket. All rounds reseeded instead of a traditional set bracket; to that end, the 9 and 10 seeds play each other in round 1, and the 7 and 8 seeds do as well, rather than the traditional 7/10 and 8/9 matchup.

The two tiebreakers used by the Atlantic Sun are 1) head-to-head records of teams with identical records and 2) NCAA NET rankings available on day following the conclusion of ASUN regular season play.

Seed	School	Conference	Head-to-Head	NET ranking
1	Eastern Kentucky	12–4		205
2	Stetson	11–5	1–0 vs. Lipscomb	217
3	Lipscomb	11–5	0–1 vs. Stetson	159
4	Austin Peay	10–6		219
5	North Florida	9–7		251
6	North Alabama	8–8	1–0 vs. Florida Gulf Coast	258
7	Florida Gulf Coast	8–8	0–1 vs. North Alabama	241
8	Queens	7–9		269
9	Kennesaw State	6–10		257
10	Jacksonville	5–11	1–0 vs. Central Arkansas	284
DNQ	Central Arkansas	5–11	0–1 vs. Jacksonville	343
DNQ	Bellarmine	4–12		318

== Schedule ==
Game	Time	Matchup	Score	Television	Attendance
First round – Monday, March 4 – Campus Sites
1	7:00 pm	No. 10 Jacksonville vs No. 9 Kennesaw State	92–86	ESPN+	150
2	7:00 pm	No. 8 Queens vs No. 7 Florida Gulf Coast	69–63	ESPN+	108
Quarterfinals – Tuesday, March 5 – Campus Sites
3	7:00 pm	No. 10 Jacksonville at No. 1 Eastern Kentucky	67–65	ESPN+	4,171
4	8:00 pm	No. 5 North Florida at No. 4 Austin Peay	98–101 ^{OT}	ESPN+	2,211
5	7:00 pm	No. 8 Queens at No. 2 Stetson	83–91	ESPN+	672
6	8:00 pm	No. 6 North Alabama at No. 3 Lipscomb	77–75	ESPN+	1,982
Semifinals – Thursday, March 7 – Campus Sites
7	7:00 pm	No. 10 Jacksonville at No. 2 Stetson	87–88	ESPN+	976
8	8:00 pm	No. 6 North Alabama at No. 4 Austin Peay	71–77	ESPN+	3,215
Championship – Sunday, March 10 – Campus Sites
9	2:00 pm	No. 4 Austin Peay at No. 2 Stetson	91–94	ESPN2	2,328
Game times in ET. Rankings denote tournament seed

== Bracket ==
First round Monday, March 4
9	Kennesaw State	86
10	Jacksonville	92
7	Florida Gulf Coast	63
8	Queens	69

Quarterfinals; Tuesday, March 5
1	Eastern Kentucky	65
10	Jacksonville	67
4	Austin Peay	101*
5	North Florida	98
2	Stetson	83
8	Queens	71
3	Lipscomb	75
6	North Alabama	77

Semifinals; Thursday, March 7
2	Stetson	88
10	Jacksonville	87
4	Austin Peay	77
6	North Alabama	71

Championship; Sunday, March 10
2	Stetson	94
4	Austin Peay	91

== Game summaries ==
=== First round ===
ESPN+

March 4
7:00 p.m.

No. 10 Jacksonville 92, No. 9 Kennesaw State 86
Scoring by half: 35–33, 57–53
Pts: McCray V (31); Rebs: Workman (15); Asts: Niblack (4)	Pts: Cottle (29); Rebs: Robinson (13); Asts: Burden (9)

Baptist Health Arena
Richmond, KY
Referees: Wil Howard, Kyle Bottoms, Matt Jarman

ESPN+

March 4
7:00 p.m.

No. 8 Queens 69, No. 7 Florida Gulf Coast 63
Scoring by half: 31–27, 38–36
Pts: McKee (23); Rebs: McLaurin(8); Asts: McLaurin/Albury/Cash (3)	Pts: Thompson (31); Rebs: Largie (7); Asts: Kellman (3)

Edmunds Center
DeLand, FL
Referees: Jon Broska, Ben Stirt, John Atanassov
