= 2023–24 Central Arkansas Bears basketball team =

American college basketball season

2023–24 Central Arkansas Bears basketball
- Conference: ASUN Conference
- Record: 9–23 (5–11 ASUN)
- Head coach: Anthony Boone (4th season)
- Associate head coach: Jeff Price
- Assistant coaches: Brock Widders; John Cranford; James Johnson
- Home arena: Farris Center (Capacity: 6,000)

2023–24 ASUN men's basketball standings
| | Conf. | | | | Overall |
| Team | W | | L | PCT | W | | L | PCT |
|---|---|---|---|---|---|---|---|---|
| Eastern Kentucky | 12 | – | 4 | .750 | 17 | – | 14 | .548 |
| Stetson † | 11 | – | 5 | .688 | 22 | – | 13 | .629 |
| Lipscomb | 11 | – | 5 | .688 | 20 | – | 12 | .625 |
| Austin Peay | 10 | – | 6 | .625 | 19 | – | 16 | .543 |
| North Florida | 9 | – | 7 | .563 | 16 | – | 16 | .500 |
| North Alabama | 8 | – | 8 | .500 | 15 | – | 17 | .469 |
| Florida Gulf Coast | 8 | – | 8 | .500 | 14 | – | 18 | .438 |
| Queens* | 7 | – | 9 | .438 | 14 | – | 19 | .424 |
| Kennesaw State | 6 | – | 10 | .375 | 15 | – | 16 | .484 |
| Jacksonville | 5 | – | 11 | .313 | 16 | – | 17 | .485 |
| Central Arkansas | 5 | – | 11 | .313 | 9 | – | 23 | .281 |
| Bellarmine* | 4 | – | 12 | .250 | 8 | – | 23 | .258 |
† 2024 ASUN tournament winner * ineligible for the 2024 NCAA tournament due to transition from Division II

The 2023–24 Central Arkansas Bears basketball team represented the University of Central Arkansas (UCA) during the 2023–24 NCAA Division I men's basketball season. The Bears, led by fourth-year head coach Anthony Boone, played their home games at the on-campus Farris Center located in Conway, Arkansas as members of the ASUN Conference. They finished the season 9–23, 5–11 in ASUN play to finish in 11th place. They failed to qualify for the ASUN tournament.

== Previous season ==
The Bears finished the 2022–23 season 9–22, 4–14 in ASUN play to finish in thirteenth place. They failed to qualify for the ASUN tournament.

== Roster ==
2023–24 Central Arkansas Bears men's basketball team
Players
Coaches

| Pos. | # | Name | Height | Weight | Year | Hometown |
|---|---|---|---|---|---|---|
| F | 0 | Ubongabasi "Glory" Etim | 6 ft 9 in (2.06 m) | 230 lb (104 kg) | So | Richmond, California |
| G | 2 | Javion Guy-King | 6 ft 6 in (1.98 m) | 205 lb (93 kg) | Fr | Little Rock, Arkansas |
| G | 3 | Tucker Bowman | 6 ft 9 in (2.06 m) | 160 lb (73 kg) | Fr | Centerton, Arkansas |
| G | 4 | Johannes Kirsipuu | 6 ft 2 in (1.88 m) | 186 lb (84 kg) | So | Sulu, Estonia |
| G | 5 | Masai Olowokere | 6 ft 5 in (1.96 m) | 195 lb (88 kg) | Sr | Brooklyn, New York |
| G | 8 | J.D. Roberts | 6 ft 6 in (1.98 m) | 200 lb (91 kg) | Fr | Kansas City, Missouri |
| G/F | 10 | Ibbe Klintman | 6 ft 9 in (2.06 m) | 210 lb (95 kg) | Jr | Malmö, Sweden |
| G | 11 | Carl Daughtery Jr. | 6 ft 3 in (1.91 m) | 200 lb (91 kg) | So | Maumelle, Arkansas |
| F | 12 | Tucker Anderson | 6 ft 9 in (2.06 m) | 190 lb (86 kg) | Fr | Centerton, Arkansas |
| G | 13 | Ben Fox | 6 ft 5 in (1.96 m) | 190 lb (86 kg) | Fr | Little Rock, Arkansas |
| F | 14 | Issakha Niang | 6 ft 8 in (2.03 m) | 220 lb (100 kg) | Jr | Dakar, Senegal |
| F | 15 | Caleb Carr | 6 ft 9 in (2.06 m) | 250 lb (113 kg) | Fr | Las Cruces, New Mexico |
| G | 20 | Brendan Simmons | 6 ft 2 in (1.88 m) | 195 lb (88 kg) | Jr | El Dorado, Arkansas |
| G | 21 | Daniel Sofield | 6 ft 7 in (2.01 m) | 215 lb (98 kg) | GS | Jackson, New Jersey |
| G | 23 | Camren Hunter | 6 ft 3 in (1.91 m) | 200 lb (91 kg) | Jr | Bryant, Arkansas |
| G | 24 | Gavin Muse | 6 ft 3 in (1.91 m) | 190 lb (86 kg) | Fr | Cabot, Arkansas |
| G/F | 25 | Elias Cato | 6 ft 9 in (2.06 m) | 220 lb (100 kg) | Jr | Queensland, Australia |

Head coach

- Anthony Boone (Mississippi)

Assistant coach(es)

- Jeff Price (Marshall)
- Brock Widders (Lyon)
- John Cranford (Liberty)
- James Johnson (Western Washington)

Legend

- (C) Team captain
- (S) Suspended
- (I) Ineligible
- (W) Walk-on
- Injured
- Current redshirt

Roster
Last update: November 13, 2023

== Schedule and results ==
| Date time, TV | Rank^{#} | Opponent^{#} | Result | Record | Site (attendance) city, state |
Exhibition
| October 30, 2023*; 7:00 pm | | at Arkansas State; Wynne Tornado Relief | L 77–112 | – | First National Bank Arena (2,208); Jonesboro, AR |
Non-conference regular season
| November 6, 2023*; 7:00 pm, ESPN+ | | at Tulsa | L 53–70 | 0–1 | Reynolds Center (2,770); Tulsa, OK |
| November 10, 2023*; 6:30 pm, ESPN+ | | Hendrix | W 82–39 | 1–1 | Farris Center (1,245); Conway, AR |
| November 13, 2023*; 6:30 pm, ESPN+ | | Arkansas–Pine Bluff | L 83–85 | 1–2 | Farris Center (2,895); Conway, AR |
| November 17, 2023*; 6:00 pm, ESPN+/SECN+ | | at Vanderbilt | L 71–75 | 1–3 | Memorial Gymnasium (5,247); Nashville, TN |
| November 20, 2023*; 6:30 pm, ESPN+ | | at Southeast Missouri State | L 68–70 | 1–4 | Show Me Center (1,231); Cape Girardeau, MO |
| November 22, 2023*; 7:00 pm, ESPN+ | | at Kansas State | L 56–100 | 1–5 | Bramlage Coliseum (8,980); Manhattan, KS |
| November 25, 2023*; 4:45 pm, ESPN+ | | Eastern Michigan; Central Arkansas Classic | L 71–74 | 1–6 | Farris Center (592); Conway, AR |
| November 26, 2023*; 2:45 pm, ESPN+ | | New Orleans; Central Arkansas Classic | L 74–79 | 1–7 | Farris Center (645); Conway, AR |
| November 29, 2023*; 9:00 pm, ESPN+ | | at Loyola Marymount | L 63–90 | 1–8 | Gersten Pavilion (752); Los Angeles, CA |
| December 3, 2023*; 10:00 pm, ESPN+ | | at Hawaii | L 76–95 | 1–9 | Stan Sheriff Center (5,714); Honolulu, HI |
| December 7, 2023*; 6:30 pm, ESPN+ | | Little Rock; I-40 Showdown | W 75–71 | 2–9 | Farris Center (2,730); Conway, AR |
| December 10, 2023*; 2:00 pm, ESPN+ | | at Eastern Illinois | W 73–70 | 3–9 | Lantz Arena (1,060); Charleston, IL |
| December 20, 2023*; 12:00 pm, ESPN+ | | Western Illinois | L 54–65 | 3–10 | Farris Center (745); Conway, AR |
| December 28, 2023*; 7:00 pm, ESPN+ | | at No. 12 Oklahoma | L 72–88 | 3–11 | Lloyd Noble Center (5,692); Norman, OK |
| December 30, 2023*; 2:00 pm, SECN | | at Missouri | L 59–92 | 3–12 | Mizzou Arena (10,623); Columbia, MO |
| January 3, 2024*; 6:30 pm, ESPN+ | | Champion Christian | W 120–54 | 4–12 | Farris Center (408); Conway, AR |
ASUN regular season
| January 6, 2024; 7:15 pm, ESPN+ | | at North Alabama | W 84–81 | 5–12 (1–0) | CB&S Bank Arena (1,756); Florence, AL |
| January 11, 2024; 7:30 pm, ESPN+ | | Eastern Kentucky | L 63–86 | 5–13 (1–1) | Farris Center (1,245); Conway, AR |
| January 13, 2024; 3:30 pm, ESPN+ | | Bellarmine | W 59–57 | 6–13 (2–1) | Farris Center (1,043); Conway, AR |
| January 18, 2024; 7:00 pm, ESPN+ | | at Lipscomb | W 96–86 | 7–13 (3–1) | Allen Arena (1,446); Nashville, TN |
| January 20, 2024; 4:15 pm, ESPN+ | | at Austin Peay | L 71–94 | 7–14 (3–2) | F&M Bank Arena (4,313); Clarksville, TN |
| January 24, 2024; 6:00 pm, ESPN+ | | at Queens | L 79–96 | 7–15 (3–3) | Curry Arena (226); Charlotte, NC |
| January 27, 2024; 3:00 pm, ESPN+ | | Kennesaw State | W 92–87 | 8–15 (4–3) | Farris Center (989); Conway, AR |
| February 1, 2024; 7:30 pm, ESPN+ | | Florida Gulf Coast | L 59–82 | 8–16 (4–4) | Farris Center (895); Conway, AR |
| February 3, 2024; 3:30 pm, ESPN+ | | Stetson | L 62–73 | 8–17 (4–5) | Farris Center (1,245); Conway, AR |
| February 8, 2024; 6:00 pm, ESPN+ | | at Jacksonville | L 55–59 | 8–18 (4–6) | Swisher Gymnasium (885); Jacksonville, FL |
| February 10, 2024; 1:00 pm, ESPN+ | | at North Florida | W 79–77 | 9–18 (5–6) | UNF Arena (2,629); Jacksonville, FL |
| February 15, 2024; 7:30 pm, ESPN+ | | Austin Peay | L 67–77 | 9–19 (5–7) | Farris Center (1,025); Conway, AR |
| February 17, 2024; 3:30 pm, ESPN+ | | Lipscomb | L 68–85 | 9–20 (5–8) | Farris Center (945); Conway, AR |
| February 22, 2024; 5:30 pm, ESPN+ | | at Bellarmine | L 65–68 | 9–21 (5–9) | Freedom Hall (1,483); Louisville, KY |
| February 24, 2024; 12:00 pm, ESPN+ | | at Eastern Kentucky | L 82–95 | 9–22 (5–10) | Baptist Health Arena (3,698); Richmond, KY |
| March 1, 2024; 6:30 pm, ESPN+ | | North Alabama | L 78–82 | 9–23 (5–11) | Farris Center (1,445); Conway, AR |
*Non-conference game. ^{#}Rankings from AP Poll. (#) Tournament seedings in parentheses. All times are in Central.
