= 2023–24 Kennesaw State Owls men's basketball team =

American college basketball season

2023–24 Kennesaw State Owls men's basketball
- Conference: ASUN Conference
- Record: 15–16 (6–10 ASUN)
- Head coach: Antoine Pettway (1st season)
- Associate head coach: Willie Watson
- Assistant coaches: Robert Kirby; Donovan Kates
- Home arena: KSU Convocation Center

2023–24 ASUN men's basketball standings
	Conf.				Overall
Team	W		L	PCT	W		L	PCT
Eastern Kentucky	12	–	4	.750	17	–	14	.548
Stetson †	11	–	5	.688	22	–	13	.629
Lipscomb	11	–	5	.688	20	–	12	.625
Austin Peay	10	–	6	.625	19	–	16	.543
North Florida	9	–	7	.563	16	–	16	.500
North Alabama	8	–	8	.500	15	–	17	.469
Florida Gulf Coast	8	–	8	.500	14	–	18	.438
Queens*	7	–	9	.438	14	–	19	.424
Kennesaw State	6	–	10	.375	15	–	16	.484
Jacksonville	5	–	11	.313	16	–	17	.485
Central Arkansas	5	–	11	.313	9	–	23	.281
Bellarmine*	4	–	12	.250	8	–	23	.258
† 2024 ASUN tournament winner * ineligible for the 2024 NCAA tournament due to transition from Division II

The 2023–24 Kennesaw State Owls men's basketball team represented Kennesaw State University in the 2023–24 NCAA Division I men's basketball season. The Owls, led by first-year head coach Antoine Pettway, played their home games at the KSU Convocation Center in Kennesaw, Georgia as members of the ASUN Conference. They finished the season 15–15, 6–10 in ASUN play, to finish in ninth place. As the No. 9 seed in the ASUN tournament, they lost to Jacksonville in the first round.

== Previous season ==
The Owls finished the 2022–23 season 26–9, 15–3 in ASUN play, to tie for first place in conference standings. They defeated Queens, Lipscomb and Liberty to win the ASUN tournament. As a result, they received the conference's automatic bid to the NCAA tournament as the No. 14 seed in the Midwest region. They lost in the first round to Xavier.

== Preseason ==
=== Preseason ASUN Conference poll ===
The Owls were picked to finish in fourth place in the conference's preseason poll. Senior guard Terrell Burden was named to the preseason All-ASUN First Team.

Coaches poll
Predicted finish	Team (1st-place votes)
1	Eastern Kentucky – 140 (8)
2	Florida Gulf Coast – 106
3	Stetson – 105
4	Kennesaw State – 103 (1)
5	Lipscomb – 99
6	Bellarmine – 81
7	North Alabama – 74 (1)
8	Austin Peay – 71 (1)
9	Jacksonville – 51
10	Queens – 47
11	North Florida – 36 (1)
12	Central Arkansas – 23

== Roster ==
2023–24 Kennesaw State Owls men's basketball team
Players
Coaches

Pos.	#	Name	Height	Weight	Year	Previous school	Hometown
F	0	Demond Robinson	6 ft 9 in (2.06 m)	235 lb (107 kg)	Sr	Murray State	Montgomery, AL
G	1	Terrell Burden	5 ft 10 in (1.78 m)	170 lb (77 kg)	Sr	Campbell HS	Smyrna, GA
G	2	RJ Johnson	6 ft 4 in (1.93 m)	225 lb (102 kg)	Fr	Grissom HS	Huntsville, AL
F	3	Jamal King	6 ft 7 in (2.01 m)	205 lb (93 kg)	Jr	West Virginia	Uniontown, AL
F	4	Cole LaRue	6 ft 9 in (2.06 m)	236 lb (107 kg)	Sr	McGill–Toolen HS	Mobile, AL
G	5	Simeon Cottle	6 ft 2 in (1.88 m)	165 lb (75 kg)	So	Tri-Cities HS	College Park, GA
F	10	Frankquon Sherman	6 ft 7 in (2.01 m)	215 lb (98 kg)	Fr	Grovetown HS	Lincolnton, GA
G	11	Delaney Heard	6 ft 3 in (1.91 m)	209 lb (95 kg)	Sr	Alabama	Canton, GA
G	20	Chase Clemons	6 ft 0 in (1.83 m)	175 lb (79 kg)	Fr	Etowah HS	Woodstock, GA
G	21	Armani Harris	6 ft 6 in (1.98 m)	215 lb (98 kg)	Sr	Newton HS	Brooklyn, NY
G	22	Marcus Whitlock	6 ft 2 in (1.88 m)	170 lb (77 kg)	Fr	Newton HS	Monticello, GA
G	23	Quincy Ademokoya	6 ft 6 in (1.98 m)	170 lb (77 kg)	Sr	Temple	Bloomington, IL
G	24	Jusaun Holt	6 ft 7 in (2.01 m)	184 lb (83 kg)	Jr	Georgia	Tacoma, WA
F	25	Rongie Gordon	6 ft 8 in (2.03 m)	220 lb (100 kg)	Sr	UAB	Montgomery, AL
G	30	Matt Brown (W)	6 ft 5 in (1.96 m)	195 lb (88 kg)	Jr	The Walker School	Stockbridge, GA
G	31	Charles Stone (W)	6 ft 2 in (1.88 m)	180 lb (82 kg)	So	Columbus HS	Columbus, GA
G	33	Eric Holland (W)	5 ft 8 in (1.73 m)	155 lb (70 kg)	So	Rome HS	Rome, GA

Head coach

- Antoine Pettway (Alabama)

Assistant coach(es)

- Willie Watson (Alabama)
- Robert Kirby (UTRGV)
- Donovan Kates (Manhattan)

Legend

- (C) Team captain
- (S) Suspended
- (I) Ineligible
- (W) Walk-on
- Injured
- Current redshirt

Roster
Last update: November 6, 2023

== Schedule and results ==
Date time, TV	Rank^{#}	Opponent^{#}	Result	Record	Site (attendance) city, state
Non-conference regular season
November 7, 2023*; 7:00 p.m., ESPN+		Oakwood	W 93–46	1–0	KSU Convocation Center (2,733); Kennesaw, GA
November 10, 2023*; 6:00 p.m., ACCNX/ESPN+		at Florida State	L 67–94	1–1	Donald L. Tucker Civic Center (6,165); Tallahassee, FL
November 15, 2023*; 7:00 p.m., ESPN+		Keiser	W 101–55	2–1	KSU Convocation Center (1,788); Kennesaw, GA
November 19, 2023*; 5:00 p.m., ESPN+		vs. Georgia Southern; Pirate Classic	W 96–92	3–1	Williams Arena at Minges Coliseum (3,673); Greenville, NC
November 20, 2023*; 3:00 p.m., ESPN+		vs. Northeastern; Pirate Classic	W 79–77	4–1	Williams Arena at Minges Coliseum (212); Greenville, NC
November 21, 2023*; 6:00 p.m., ESPN+		vs. East Carolina; Pirate Classic	L 84–85	4–2	Williams Arena at Minges Coliseum (3,311); Greenville, NC
November 26, 2023*; 6:00 p.m., ESPN+		at FIU	L 84–91	4–3	Ocean Bank Convocation Center (755); Miami, FL
December 2, 2023*; 1:00 p.m., ESPN+		Georgia State	W 88–77	5–3	KSU Convocation Center (3,805); Kennesaw, GA
December 5, 2023*; 7:00 p.m., ESPN+		UNC Asheville	W 79–76 ^{OT}	6–3	KSU Convocation Center (1,230); Kennesaw, GA
December 9, 2023*; 7:00 p.m., ESPN+		at USC Upstate	W 84–77	7–3	G. B. Hodge Center (472); Spartanburg, SC
December 16, 2023*; 2:00 p.m., ESPN+		at Presbyterian	W 94–84	8–3	Templeton Physical Education Center (514); Clinton, SC
December 19, 2023*; 7:00 p.m., ESPN+		Brescia	W 91–59	9–3	KSU Convocation Center (1,327); Kennesaw, GA
December 23, 2023*; 2:00 p.m., ESPN+		at UNC Asheville	L 70–79	9–4	Kimmel Arena (1,579); Asheville, NC
December 29, 2023*; 6:00 p.m., BTN Plus		at Indiana	L 87–100	9–5	Simon Skjodt Assembly Hall (16,689); Bloomington, IN
ASUN Conference regular season
January 6, 2024; 5:00 p.m., ESPN+		Queens	W 80–77	10–5 (1–0)	KSU Convocation Center (1,921); Kennesaw, GA
January 10, 2024; 7:10 p.m., ESPN+		Stetson	W 88–70	11–5 (2–0)	KSU Convocation Center (1,729); Kennesaw, GA
January 12, 2024; 7:00 p.m., ESPN+		Florida Gulf Coast	W 78–75	12–5 (3–0)	KSU Convocation Center (1,769); Kennesaw, GA
January 18, 2024; 7:00 p.m., ESPN+		at North Florida	L 75–84	12–6 (3–1)	UNF Arena (1,377); Jacksonville, FL
January 20, 2024; 3:00 p.m., ESPN+		at Jacksonville	W 83–79	13–6 (4–1)	Swisher Gymnasium (1,081); Jacksonville, FL
January 24, 2024; 7:00 p.m., ESPN+		North Alabama	L 84–90	13–7 (4–2)	KSU Convocation Center (1,422); Kennesaw, GA
January 27, 2024; 4:00 p.m., ESPN+		at Central Arkansas	L 87–92	13–8 (4–3)	Farris Center (989); Conway, AR
February 1, 2024; 7:30 p.m., ESPN+		Bellarmine	L 95–96 ^{OT}	13–9 (4–4)	KSU Convocation Center (1,630); Kennesaw, GA
February 3, 2024; 5:00 p.m., ESPN+		Eastern Kentucky	L 76–86	13–10 (4–5)	KSU Convcation Center (2,357); Kennesaw, GA
February 8, 2024; 6:00 p.m., ESPN+		at Austin Peay	L 69–85	13–11 (4–6)	Dunn Center (2,032); Clarksville, TN
February 10, 2024; 5:00 p.m., ESPN+		at Lipscomb	L 95–101	13–12 (4–7)	Allen Arena (2,134); Nashville, TN
February 14, 2024; 7:00 p.m., ESPN+		Jacksonville	W 66–61	14–12 (5–7)	KSU Convocation Center (1,158); Kennesaw, GA
February 16, 2024; 7:00 p.m., ESPN+		North Florida	L 81–82	14–13 (5–8)	KSU Convocation Center (1,841); Kennesaw, GA
February 22, 2024; 7:00 p.m., ESPN+		at Florida Gulf Coast	W 74–67	15–13 (6–8)	Alico Arena (2,123); Fort Myers, FL
February 24, 2024; 2:00 p.m., ESPN+		at Stetson	L 72–84	15–14 (6–9)	Edmunds Center (580); DeLand, FL
March 1, 2024; 7:00 p.m., ESPN+		at Queens	L 82–91	15–15 (6–10)	Curry Arena (344); Charlotte, NC
ASUN tournament
March 4, 2024; 7:00 p.m., ESPN+	(9)	vs. (10) Jacksonville; First round	L 86–92	15–16	Baptist Health Arena (150); Richmond, KY
*Non-conference game. ^{#}Rankings from AP poll. (#) Tournament seedings in parentheses. All times are in Eastern.
