= Corey Gipson =

College basketball coach

Current position
- Title: Head coach
- Team: Austin Peay
- Conference: UAC
- Record: 55–44 (.556)

Biographical details
- Born: January 22, 1981 (age 45); Sikeston, Missouri, U.S.

Playing career
- 2000–2002: Three Rivers CC
- 2002–2004: Austin Peay

Coaching career (HC unless noted)
- 2005–2009: Virginia State (assistant)
- 2009–2012: UNC Greensboro (assistant)
- 2012–2015: Austin Peay (assistant)
- 2015–2022: Missouri State (assistant)
- 2022–2023: Northwestern State
- 2023–present: Austin Peay

Head coaching record
- Overall: 77–55 (.583)
- Tournaments: 0–1 (CIT)

Accomplishments and honors

Championships
- ASUN regular season (2026)

Corey Gipson (born January 22, 1981) is an American basketball coach who is the current head coach of the Austin Peay Governors men's basketball team.

== Playing career ==
Gipson played his first two years at Three Rivers Community College in Poplar Bluff, Missouri before transferring to Austin Peay where he was part of two Governors Ohio Valley Conference regular season titles, including the 2003 OVC tournament title for a berth in the NCAA tournament.

== Coaching career ==
After graduating, Gipson started his coaching career as an assistant at Virginia State from 2005 to 2009 before joining the staff at UNC Greensboro where he would coach under both Mike Dement and Wes Miller. Gipson would return to his alma mater as an assistant coach from 2012 to 2015, then become an assistant coach at Missouri State in 2016.

=== Northwestern State ===
On March 21, 2022, Gipson was named the 10th coach in Northwestern State's history, replacing the retiring Mike McConathy.

=== Austin Peay ===
Gipson returned to Austin Peay on March 12, 2023 to become their head coach, replacing Nate James.

== Head coaching record ==
Record table
Season	Team	Overall	Conference	Standing	Postseason
Northwestern State Demons (Southland Conference) (2022–2023)
2022–23	Northwestern State	22–11	13–5	2nd	
Northwestern State:		22–11 (.667)	13–5 (.722)		
Austin Peay Governors (Atlantic Sun Conference) (2023–2026)
2023–24	Austin Peay	19–16	10–6	4th	CIT Quarterfinals
2024–25	Austin Peay	14–19	8–10	T–7th	
2025–26	Austin Peay	22–9	15–3	T–1st	
Austin Peay:		55–44 (.556)	33–19 (.635)		
Total:		77–55 (.583)			
National champion Postseason invitational champion Conference regular season champion Conference regular season and conference tournament champion Division regular season champion Division regular season and conference tournament champion Conference tournament champion
