= 2023–24 North Florida Ospreys men's basketball team =

American college basketball season

2023–24 North Florida Ospreys men's basketball
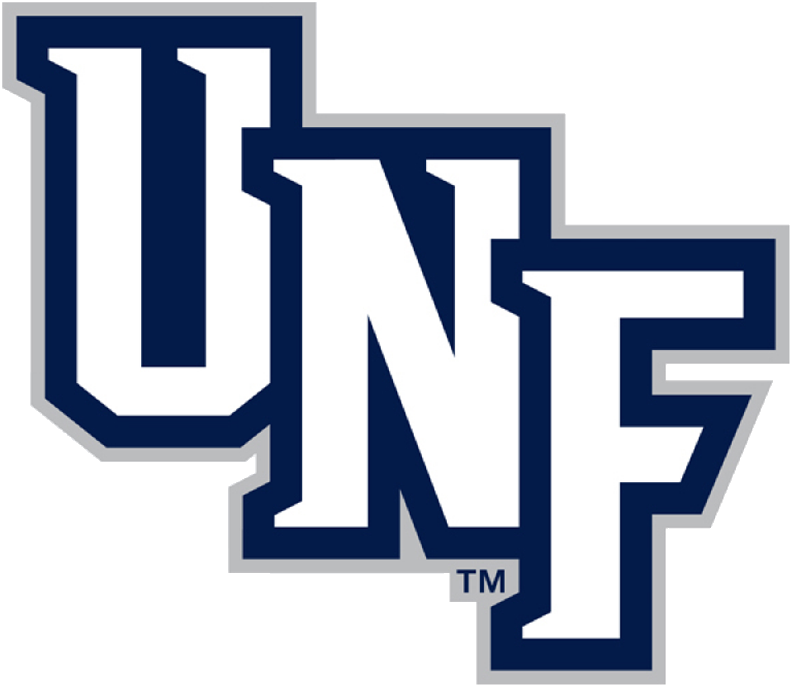
- Conference: ASUN Conference
- Record: 16–16 (9–7 ASUN)
- Head coach: Matthew Driscoll (15th season)
- Associate head coach: Bobby Kennen
- Assistant coaches: Bruce Evans; Stephen Perkins; Donnie Holland
- Home arena: UNF Arena

2023–24 ASUN men's basketball standings
	Conf.				Overall
Team	W		L	PCT	W		L	PCT
Eastern Kentucky	12	–	4	.750	17	–	14	.548
Stetson †	11	–	5	.688	22	–	13	.629
Lipscomb	11	–	5	.688	20	–	12	.625
Austin Peay	10	–	6	.625	19	–	16	.543
North Florida	9	–	7	.563	16	–	16	.500
North Alabama	8	–	8	.500	15	–	17	.469
Florida Gulf Coast	8	–	8	.500	14	–	18	.438
Queens*	7	–	9	.438	14	–	19	.424
Kennesaw State	6	–	10	.375	15	–	16	.484
Jacksonville	5	–	11	.313	16	–	17	.485
Central Arkansas	5	–	11	.313	9	–	23	.281
Bellarmine*	4	–	12	.250	8	–	23	.258
† 2024 ASUN tournament winner * ineligible for the 2024 NCAA tournament due to transition from Division II

The 2023–24 North Florida Ospreys men's basketball team represented the University of North Florida during the 2023–24 NCAA Division I men's basketball season. The Ospreys, led by 15th-year head coach Matthew Driscoll, played their home games at the UNF Arena in Jacksonville, Florida as members of the ASUN Conference. They finished the season 16–16, 9–7 in ASUN play, to finish in fifth place.

== Previous season ==
The Ospreys finished the 2022–23 season 14–17, 9–9 in ASUN play, to finish in a tie for seventh place. They were defeated by Bellarmine in the first round of the ASUN tournament.

== Roster ==
2023–24 North Florida Ospreys men's basketball team
Players
Coaches

Pos.	#	Name	Height	Weight	Year	Previous school	Hometown
G	0	Jasai Miles	6 ft 6 in (1.98 m)	205 lb (93 kg)	Fr	Miami Country Day School	Miami, FL
G	1	Jah Nze	6 ft 4 in (1.93 m)	224 lb (102 kg)	So	Hagerty High School	Oviedo, FL
G	2	Chaz Lanier	6 ft 4 in (1.93 m)	199 lb (90 kg)	Jr	The Ensworth School	Nashville, TN
G	3	Mason Lee	6 ft 7 in (2.01 m)	187 lb (85 kg)	Fr	Providence School	Jacksonville Beach, FL
F	4	Trent Coleman	6 ft 6 in (1.98 m)	196 lb (89 kg)	Jr	Southwest Mississippi CC	Ridgeland, MS
G/F	5	Dorian James	6 ft 7 in (2.01 m)	213 lb (97 kg)	RS Sr	Chain of Lakes Collegiate HS	Winter Haven, FL
G	11	Nate Lliteras	6 ft 6 in (1.98 m)	216 lb (98 kg)	Jr	Longwood	Seward, NE
G	12	Jaylen Smith	5 ft 11 in (1.8 m)	175 lb (79 kg)	Fr	West Oaks Academy	Ocoee, FL
G	13	Max Hrdlicka	6 ft 6 in (1.98 m)	207 lb (94 kg)	RS So	Glynn Academy	Brunswick, GA
G	21	Brandon Rasmussen	6 ft 4 in (1.93 m)	183 lb (83 kg)	Jr	Potters House Academy	Christiansted, USVI
F	32	Jake van der Heijden	6 ft 8 in (2.03 m)	225 lb (102 kg)	Sr	Bucknell	Raleigh, NC
G	33	Oscar Berry	6 ft 5 in (1.96 m)	193 lb (88 kg)	Jr	Fairleigh Dickinson	Melbourne, Australia
G	55	Ametri Moss	6 ft 0 in (1.83 m)	163 lb (74 kg)	Jr	State College of Florida	Clarksville, TN

Head coach

- Matthew Driscoll (Slippery Rock)

Assistant coach(es)

- Bobby Kennen (Palm Beach Atlantic)
- Bruce Evans (Furman)
- Stephen Perkins (Baylor)
- Donnie Holland (Campbell)

Legend

- (C) Team captain
- (S) Suspended
- (I) Ineligible
- (W) Walk-on
- Injured
- Current redshirt

Roster
Last update: November 10, 2023

== Schedule and results ==
Date time, TV	Rank^{#}	Opponent^{#}	Result	Record	Site (attendance) city, state
Non-conference regular season
November 6, 2023*; 7:00 p.m., ESPN+		Coastal Georgia	W 92–55	1–0	UNF Arena (2,129); Jacksonville, FL
November 9, 2023*; 7:00 p.m., ESPN+		at Charleston Southern	W 81–70	2–0	Buccaneer Field House (587); North Charleston, SC
November 13, 2023*; 7:00 p.m.		at South Carolina State	L 77–87	2–1	SHM Memorial Center (369); Orangeburg, SC
November 16, 2023*; 7:00 p.m., ESPN+		Presbyterian; First Coast Classic	L 69–81	2–2	UNF Arena (1,279); Jacksonville, FL
November 17, 2023*; 7:00 p.m., ESPN+		Northwestern State; First Coast Classic	W 80–74	3–2	UNF Arena (1,229); Jacksonville, FL
November 18, 2023*; 5:00 p.m., ESPN+		Maine; First Coast Classic	W 67–58	4–2	UNF Arena (1,259); Jacksonville, FL
November 24, 2023*; 8:00 p.m., ESPN+/SECN+		at LSU	L 63–75	4–3	Pete Maravich Assembly Center (7,940); Baton Rouge, LA
November 29, 2023*; 9:00 p.m., B1G+		at Iowa	L 78–103	4–4	Carver–Hawkeye Arena (8,641); Iowa City, IA
December 2, 2023*; 2:00 p.m., ESPN+		High Point	L 79–86	4–5	UNF Arena (1,289); Jacksonville, FL
December 5, 2023*; 7:00 p.m., ESPN+		Edward Waters	W 99–47	5–5	UNF Arena (1,189); Jacksonville, FL
December 9, 2023*; 2:00 p.m., ESPN+		Georgia Southern	W 64–56	6–5	UNF Arena (1,138); Jacksonville, FL
December 16, 2023*; 2:00 p.m., ESPN+		Trinity Baptist	W 113–72	7–5	UNF Arena (1,009); Jacksonville, FL
December 19, 2023*; 8:00 p.m., ACCN		at Florida State	L 75–91	7–6	Donald L. Tucker Civic Center (4,056); Tallahassee, FL
December 22, 2023*; 3:00 p.m., ESPN+/SECN+		at Georgia	L 60–78	7–7	Stegeman Coliseum (6,603); Athens, GA
December 29, 2023*; 6:00 p.m., ACCN		at Miami (FL)	L 55–95	7–8	Watsco Center (6,504); Coral Gables, FL
ASUN regular season
January 4, 2024; 7:00 p.m., ESPN+		at Stetson	L 74–75	7–9 (0–1)	Edmunds Center (534); DeLand, FL
January 6, 2024; 7:00 p.m., ESPN+		at Florida Gulf Coast	W 78–58	8–9 (1–1)	Alico Arena (2,272); Fort Myers, FL
January 12, 2024; 7:00 p.m., ESPN+		Jacksonville	W 82–74	9–9 (2–1)	UNF Arena (4,559); Jacksonville, FL
January 18, 2024; 7:00 p.m., ESPN+		Kennesaw State	W 84–75	10–9 (3–1)	UNF Arena (1,377); Jacksonville, FL
January 20, 2024; 5:00 p.m., ESPN+		Queens	W 91–75	11–9 (4–1)	UNF Arena (1,559); Jacksonville, FL
January 25, 2024; 6:30 p.m., ESPN+		at Bellarmine	W 71–63	12–9 (5–1)	Freedom Hall (1,484); Louisville, KY
January 27, 2024; 4:00 p.m., ESPN+		at Eastern Kentucky	L 76–89	12–10 (5–2)	Baptist Health Arena (4,278); Richmond, KY
January 31, 2024; 7:00 p.m., ESPN+		Lipscomb	W 85–76	13–10 (6–2)	UNF Arena (1,409); Jacksonville, FL
February 3, 2024; 5:15 p.m., ESPN+		at Austin Peay	L 91–95 ^{2OT}	13–11 (6–3)	F&M Bank Arena (3,312); Clarksville, TN
February 8, 2024; 7:00 p.m., ESPN+		North Alabama	L 74–79	13–12 (6–4)	UNF Arena (1,119); Jacksonville, FL
February 10, 2024; 2:00 p.m., ESPN+		Central Arkansas	L 77–79	13–13 (6–5)	UNF Arena (2,629); Jacksonville, FL
February 14, 2024; 7:00 p.m., ESPN+		at Queens	W 93–79	14–13 (7–5)	Curry Arena (101); Charlotte, NC
February 16, 2024; 7:00 p.m., ESPN+		at Kennesaw State	W 82–81	15–13 (8–5)	KSU Convocation Center (1,841); Kennesaw, GA
February 23, 2024; 7:00 p.m., ESPN+		at Jacksonville	L 50–62	15–14 (8–6)	Swisher Gymnasium (2,500); Jacksonville, FL
February 28, 2024; 7:00 p.m., ESPN+		Florida Gulf Coast	L 60–79	15–15 (8–7)	UNF Arena (1,755); Jacksonville, FL
March 1, 2024; 7:00 p.m., ESPN+		Stetson	W 59–57	16–15 (9–7)	UNF Arena (902); Jacksonville, FL
ASUN tournament
March 5, 2024; 8:00 p.m., ESPN+	(5)	at (4) Austin Peay; Quarterfinals	L 98–101 ^{OT}	16–16	F&M Bank Arena (2,211); Clarksville, TN
*Non-conference game. ^{#}Rankings from AP poll. (#) Tournament seedings in parentheses. All times are in Eastern.
