= 2023–24 Lipscomb Bisons men's basketball team =

American college basketball season

2023–24 Lipscomb Bisons men's basketball
- Conference: ASUN Conference
- Record: 20–12 (11–5 ASUN)
- Head coach: Lennie Acuff (5th season)
- Assistant coaches: Roger Idstrom; Tyler Murray; Vince Martin; Will Acuff; Peyton Mattingly
- Home arena: Allen Arena

2023–24 ASUN men's basketball standings
	Conf.				Overall
Team	W		L	PCT	W		L	PCT
Eastern Kentucky	12	–	4	.750	17	–	14	.548
Stetson †	11	–	5	.688	22	–	13	.629
Lipscomb	11	–	5	.688	20	–	12	.625
Austin Peay	10	–	6	.625	19	–	16	.543
North Florida	9	–	7	.563	16	–	16	.500
North Alabama	8	–	8	.500	15	–	17	.469
Florida Gulf Coast	8	–	8	.500	14	–	18	.438
Queens*	7	–	9	.438	14	–	19	.424
Kennesaw State	6	–	10	.375	15	–	16	.484
Jacksonville	5	–	11	.313	16	–	17	.485
Central Arkansas	5	–	11	.313	9	–	23	.281
Bellarmine*	4	–	12	.250	8	–	23	.258
† 2024 ASUN tournament winner * ineligible for the 2024 NCAA tournament due to transition from Division II

The 2023–24 Lipscomb Bisons men's basketball team represented Lipscomb University during the 2023–24 NCAA Division I men's basketball season. The Bisons, led by fifth-year head coach Lennie Acuff, played their home games at the Allen Arena in Nashville, Tennessee as members of the ASUN Conference.

== Previous season ==
The Bisons finished the 2022–23 season 20–13, 11–7 in ASUN play, to finish in fifth place. They defeated Stetson in the quarterfinals of the ASUN tournament, before falling to Kennesaw State in the semifinals.

== Roster ==
2023–24 Lipscomb Bisons men's basketball team
Players
Coaches

Pos.	#	Name	Height	Weight	Year	Previous school	Hometown
G	0	AJ McGinnis	6 ft 4 in (1.93 m)	177 lb (80 kg)	Jr	Cincinnati	Huntsville, AL
F	1	Rylan Houck	6 ft 5 in (1.96 m)	192 lb (87 kg)	Fr	Oxford High School	Oxford, AL
G	2	Will Pruitt	6 ft 3 in (1.91 m)	195 lb (88 kg)	Jr	Mount Juliet High School	Mount Juliet, TN
G	3	Logan Suber	6 ft 0 in (1.83 m)	170 lb (77 kg)	Fr	Mt. Zion Prep Academy	Fredericksburg, VA
G	4	Derrin Boyd	6 ft 3 in (1.91 m)	210 lb (95 kg)	GS	Georgetown College	Princeton, KY
G	5	Cody Head	6 ft 3 in (1.91 m)	170 lb (77 kg)	Fr	Lutheran High School East	Cleveland, OH
G	10	Jack Ingold	6 ft 3 in (1.91 m)	190 lb (86 kg)	Sr	George Washington High School	Charleston, WV
C	11	Owen McCormack	6 ft 9 in (2.06 m)	230 lb (104 kg)	GS	Presbyterian	Advance, NC
G	12	Paxton Davidson	6 ft 3 in (1.91 m)	197 lb (89 kg)	Fr	Green Hill High School	Mount Juliet, TN
F	13	Hank Hutcheson	6 ft 6 in (1.98 m)	191 lb (87 kg)	Sr	Trevecca	Brentwood, TN
F	15	Dylan Faulkner	6 ft 9 in (2.06 m)	215 lb (98 kg)	Fr	Calhoun High School	Calhoun, GA
F	21	TJ Johnson	6 ft 6 in (1.98 m)	203 lb (92 kg)	Fr	Belton High School	Belton, TX
G	22	Joe Anderson	6 ft 0 in (1.83 m)	175 lb (79 kg)	Jr	Furman	Maryville, TN
G	24	Jason Montgomery	6 ft 5 in (1.96 m)	200 lb (91 kg)	GS	Drury	St. Louis, MO
G	33	Zach Lamey	6 ft 3 in (1.91 m)	175 lb (79 kg)	Fr	Briarwood Christian School	Birmingham, AL
C	35	Grant Asman	6 ft 11 in (2.11 m)	210 lb (95 kg)	So	Kimberly High School	Kimberly, AL
F	41	Jacob Ognacevic	6 ft 8 in (2.03 m)	220 lb (100 kg)	Jr	Valparaiso	Sheboygan, WI

Head coach

- Lennie Acuff (Shorter)

Assistant coach(es)

- Roger Idstrom (Mars Hill)
- Tyler Murray (Hampden–Sydney)
- Vince Martin (Jacksonville)
- Will Acuff (Alabama–Huntsville)
- Peyton Mattingly (Lipscomb)

Legend

- (C) Team captain
- (S) Suspended
- (I) Ineligible
- (W) Walk-on
- Injured
- Current redshirt

Roster
Last update: November 14, 2023

== Schedule and results ==
Date time, TV	Rank^{#}	Opponent^{#}	Result	Record	Site (attendance) city, state
Non-conference regular season
November 6, 2023*; 6:30 p.m., ESPN+		at Wichita State	L 59–76	0–1	Charles Koch Arena (6,286); Wichita, KS
November 8, 2023*; 7:00 p.m., ESPN+		at Drake	L 70–85	0–2	Knapp Center (3,021); Des Moines, IA
November 11, 2023*; 4:00 p.m., ESPN+		Asbury	W 113–74	1–2	Allen Arena (2,179); Nashville, TN
November 14, 2023*; 6:00 p.m., ESPN+		at Tennessee Tech	W 96–65	2–2	Eblen Center (899); Cookeville, TN
November 18, 2023*; 12:00 p.m., ESPN+		Alabama A&M	W 106–81	3–2	Allen Arena (823); Nashville, TN
November 24, 2023*; 1:00 p.m.		vs. UNC Asheville; Northern Classic	W 86–75	4–2	Place Bell; Laval, QC
November 25, 2023*; 6:00 p.m.		vs. Bowling Green; Northern Classic	L 61–82	4–3	Place Bell; Laval, QC
November 26, 2023*; 12:30 p.m.		vs. Wofford; Northern Classic	W 85–78	5–3	Place Bell; Laval, QC
November 29, 2023*; 11:00 a.m., ESPN+		Chattanooga	W 82–68	6–3	Allen Arena (2,132); Nashville, TN
December 2, 2023*; 3:00 p.m., ESPN+		at UCF	L 57–72	6–4	Addition Financial Arena (5,152); Orlando, FL
December 6, 2023*; 7:00 p.m., ESPN+		at Belmont; Battle of the Boulevard	L 71–72	6–5	Curb Event Center (4,301); Nashville, TN
December 10, 2023*; 4:00 p.m., ESPN+		Tennessee State	W 78–71	7–5	Allen Arena (1,961); Nashville, TN
December 16, 2023*; 5:00 p.m., ESPN+/SECN+		vs. Arkansas	L 66–69	7–6	Simmons Bank Arena; North Little Rock, AR
December 20, 2023*; 7:00 p.m., ESPN+		Bryan	W 101–55	8–6	Allen Arena (435); Nashville, TN
December 30, 2023*; 3:00 p.m., ESPN+/ACCNX		at Florida State	W 78–75	9–6	Donald L. Tucker Civic Center (4,051); Tallahassee, FL
ASUN regular season
January 4, 2024; 6:00 p.m., ESPN+		at Eastern Kentucky	L 72–80	9–7 (0–1)	Baptist Health Arena (2,476); Richmond, KY
January 6, 2024; 3:00 p.m., ESPN+		at Bellarmine	W 81–70	10–7 (1–1)	Freedom Hall (1,742); Louisville, KY
January 13, 2024; 4:00 p.m., ESPN+		Austin Peay	W 91–77	11–7 (2–1)	Allen Arena (2,082); Nashville, TN
January 18, 2024; 7:00 p.m., ESPN+		Central Arkansas	L 86–96	11–8 (2–2)	Allen Arena (1,446); Nashville, TN
January 20, 2024; 4:00 p.m., ESPN+		North Alabama	W 88–79	12–8 (3–2)	Allen Arena (1,667); Nashville, TN
January 25, 2024; 6:00 p.m., ESPN+		at Florida Gulf Coast	W 98–72	13–8 (4–2)	Alico Arena (1,805); Fort Myers, FL
January 27, 2024; 1:00 p.m., ESPN+		at Stetson	L 59–80	13–9 (4–3)	Edmunds Center (596); DeLand, FL
January 31, 2024; 6:00 p.m., ESPN+		at North Florida	L 76–85	13–10 (4–4)	UNF Arena (1,409); Jacksonville, FL
February 3, 2024; 4:00 p.m., ESPN+		Jacksonville	W 84–82	14–10 (5–4)	Allen Arena (1,777); Nashville, TN
February 8, 2024; 7:00 p.m., ESPN+		Queens	W 90–88	15–10 (6–4)	Allen Arena (1,582); Nashville, TN
February 10, 2024; 4:00 p.m., ESPN+		Kennesaw State	W 101–95	16–10 (7–4)	Allen Arena (2,134); Nashville, TN
February 15, 2024; 7:45 p.m., ESPN+		at North Alabama	L 70–75	16–11 (7–5)	CB&S Bank Arena (1,474); Florence, AL
February 17, 2024; 3:30 p.m., ESPN+		at Central Arkansas	W 85–68	17–11 (8–5)	Farris Center (945); Conway, AR
February 24, 2024; 4:15 p.m., ESPN+		at Austin Peay	W 90–85	18–11 (9–5)	F&M Bank Arena (5,681); Clarksville, TN
February 28, 2024; 7:00 p.m., ESPN+		Bellarmine	W 90–74	19–11 (10–5)	Allen Arena (1,588); Nashville, TN
March 1, 2024; 7:00 p.m., ESPN+		Eastern Kentucky	W 81–67	20–11 (11–5)	Allen Arena (2,026); Nashville, TN
ASUN tournament
March 5, 2024; 7:00 p.m., ESPN+	(3)	(6) North Alabama; Quarterfinals	L 75–77	20–12	Allen Arena (1,982); Nashville, TN
*Non-conference game. ^{#}Rankings from AP poll. (#) Tournament seedings in parentheses. All times are in Central.
