= 2023–24 Bellarmine Knights men's basketball team =

American college basketball season

2023–24 Bellarmine Knights men's basketball
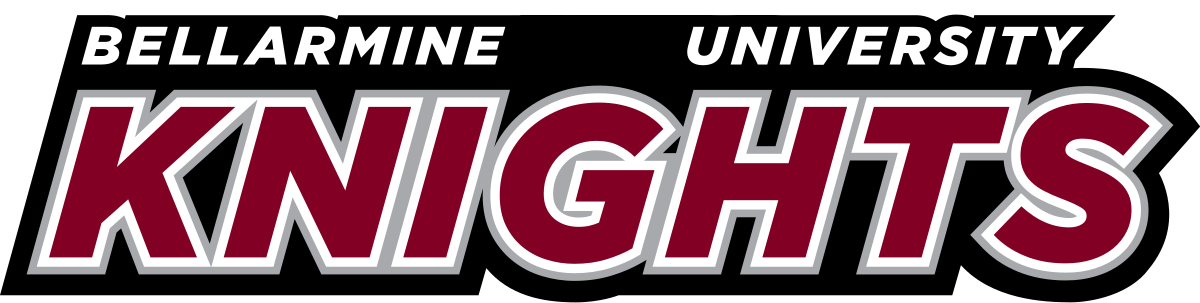
- Conference: Atlantic Sun Conference
- Record: 8–23 (4–12 ASUN)
- Head coach: Scott Davenport (19th season)
- Assistant coaches: Doug Davenport; Beau Braden; Al Davis
- Home arena: Freedom Hall

2023–24 ASUN men's basketball standings
	Conf.				Overall
Team	W		L	PCT	W		L	PCT
Eastern Kentucky	12	–	4	.750	17	–	14	.548
Stetson †	11	–	5	.688	22	–	13	.629
Lipscomb	11	–	5	.688	20	–	12	.625
Austin Peay	10	–	6	.625	19	–	16	.543
North Florida	9	–	7	.563	16	–	16	.500
North Alabama	8	–	8	.500	15	–	17	.469
Florida Gulf Coast	8	–	8	.500	14	–	18	.438
Queens*	7	–	9	.438	14	–	19	.424
Kennesaw State	6	–	10	.375	15	–	16	.484
Jacksonville	5	–	11	.313	16	–	17	.485
Central Arkansas	5	–	11	.313	9	–	23	.281
Bellarmine*	4	–	12	.250	8	–	23	.258
† 2024 ASUN tournament winner * ineligible for the 2024 NCAA tournament due to transition from Division II

The 2023–24 Bellarmine Knights men's basketball team represented Bellarmine University during the 2023–24 NCAA Division I men's basketball season. The Knights, led by 19th-year head coach Scott Davenport, played their home games at Freedom Hall in Louisville, Kentucky as members of the Atlantic Sun Conference (ASUN). They finished the season 8–23, 4–11 in ASUN play to finish in last place. They failed to qualify for the ASUN tournament.

The Knights were in the final year of a four-year transition from Division II to Division I, making the 2023–24 season the final season that they were ineligible for the NCAA tournament.

This was also the Knights' final season at Freedom Hall. Near the start of the 2024–25 school year, which coincided with the end of Bellarmine's transition to Division I, the school announced that home games would return to campus at Knights Hall.

== Previous season ==
The Knights finished the 2022–23 season 15–18, 9–9 in ASUN play to finish in a tie for seventh place. They defeated North Florida in the first round of the ASUN tournament, before falling to Liberty in the quarterfinals.

== Roster ==
2023–24 Bellarmine Knights men's basketball team
Players
Coaches

Pos.	#	Name	Height	Weight	Year	Previous school	Hometown
G	0	AJ Lux	6 ft 5 in (1.96 m)	175 lb (79 kg)	Fr	Crown Point High School	Crown Point, Indiana
G	1	Landin Hacker	6 ft 0 in (1.83 m)	185 lb (84 kg)	RS So	Center Grove High School	Greenwood, Indiana
G	2	Alec Pfriem	6 ft 5 in (1.96 m)	205 lb (93 kg)	GS	Moeller High School	Cincinnati, Ohio
G	4	Dezmond McKinney	6 ft 0 in (1.83 m)	185 lb (84 kg)	Jr	North Dakota State	Raytown, Missouri
G	5	Peter Suder	6 ft 5 in (1.96 m)	220 lb (100 kg)	So	Carmel High School	Carmel, Indiana
G	10	Garrett Tipton	6 ft 4 in (1.93 m)	205 lb (93 kg)	GS	Bishop Hartley High School	Cincinnati, Ohio
G	11	Billy Smith	6 ft 7 in (2.01 m)	205 lb (93 kg)	So	Miami (OH)	Indianapolis, Indiana
F	12	Langdon Hatton	6 ft 10 in (2.08 m)	240 lb (109 kg)	Jr	William & Mary	Georgetown, Indiana
G	14	Kenyon Goodin	6 ft 3 in (1.91 m)	190 lb (86 kg)	Fr	Collins High School	Shelbyville, Kentucky
G	20	Grant Whitaker	6 ft 4 in (1.93 m)	185 lb (84 kg)	Fr	Murray High School	Murray, Kentucky
G	22	Bash Wieland	6 ft 6 in (1.98 m)	215 lb (98 kg)	GS	Lakota East High School	Cincinnati, Ohio
G	23	Zach Reed	6 ft 2 in (1.88 m)	185 lb (84 kg)	RS Fr	Brebeuf Jesuit Prep	Indianapolis, Indiana
F	24	Eli Roberts	6 ft 7 in (2.01 m)	235 lb (107 kg)	Sr	Manual High School	Louisville, Kentucky
F	25	Luke Anderson	6 ft 8 in (2.03 m)	185 lb (84 kg)	Fr	North Oldham High School	Goshen, Kentucky
G	33	Ben Johnson	6 ft 3 in (1.91 m)	195 lb (88 kg)	RS So	Lexington Catholic High School	Lexington, Kentucky
F	42	Curt Hopf	6 ft 8 in (2.03 m)	225 lb (102 kg)	Jr	Barr-Reeve High School	Montgomery, Indiana
G	55	Zac Jennings	6 ft 5 in (1.96 m)	215 lb (98 kg)	Sr	Cooper High School	Burlington, Kentucky

Head coach

- Scott Davenport (Louisville)

Assistant coach(es)

- Doug Davenport (Bellarmine)
- Beau Braden (Centre)
- Al Davis (Bellarmine)

Legend

- (C) Team captain
- (S) Suspended
- (I) Ineligible
- (W) Walk-on
- Injured
- Current redshirt

Roster
Last update: November 1, 2023

== Schedule and results ==
Date time, TV	Rank^{#}	Opponent^{#}	Result	Record	Site (attendance) city, state
Exhibition
October 24, 2023*; 6:30 pm		Transylvania	W 75–44	–	Knights Hall (1,396); Louisville, KY
Non-conference regular season
November 6, 2023*; 11:30 pm, P12N		at Washington	L 57–91	0–1	Alaska Airlines Arena (5,568); Seattle, WA
November 10, 2023*; 8:00 pm, ESPN+		at Kansas State	L 75–83	0–2	Bramlage Coliseum (9,947); Manhattan, KS
November 14, 2023*; 7:00 pm, ESPN+		at Chattanooga	L 64–72	0–3	McKenzie Arena (2,846); Chattanooga, TN
November 17, 2023*; 7:00 pm, ESPN+		at Bowling Green	W 85–67	1–3	Stroh Center (1,775); Bowling Green, OH
November 20, 2023*; 6:30 pm, ESPN+		Morehead State	L 51–64	1–4	Freedom Hall (2,018); Louisville, KY
November 21, 2023*; 6:30 pm, ESPN+		Midway	W 77–56	2–4	Freedom Hall (2,300); Louisville, KY
November 26, 2023*; 5:00 pm, ESPN+		at West Virginia	L 58–62	2–5	WVU Coliseum (9,181); Morgantown, WV
November 29, 2023*; 8:00 pm, ESPN+/ACCNX		at Louisville	L 68–73	2–6	KFC Yum! Center (11,538); Louisville, KY
December 2, 2023*; 2:00 pm, ESPN+		at Ball State	L 58–67	2–7	Worthen Arena (3,588); Muncie, IN
December 4, 2023*; 11:00 am, ESPN+		Boyce	W 88–54	3–7	Freedom Hall (1,850); Louisville, KY
December 7, 2023*; 11:00 am, ESPN+		Berea	W 98–59	4–7	Freedom Hall (1,032); Louisville, KY
December 16, 2023*; 4:00 pm, ESPN+		Evansville	L 61–70	4–8	Freedom Hall (2,438); Louisville, KY
December 20, 2023*; 9:00 pm, P12N		at Utah	L 43–85	4–9	Jon M. Huntsman Center (7,310); Salt Lake City, UT
December 22, 2023*; 9:00 pm, ESPN+		at No. 17 BYU	L 59–101	4–10	Marriott Center (14,429); Provo, UT
December 30, 2023*; 7:00 pm, ESPN+		at High Point	L 85–90	4–11	Qubein Center (2,742); High Point, NC
ASUN regular season
January 4, 2024; 6:30 pm, ESPN+		Austin Peay	L 68–84	4–12 (0–1)	Freedom Hall (2,749); Louisville, KY
January 6, 2024; 4:00 pm, ESPN+		Lipscomb	L 70–81	4–13 (0–2)	Freedom Hall (1,742); Louisville, KY
January 11, 2024; 8:45 pm, ESPN+		at North Alabama	L 53–69	4–14 (0–3)	CB&S Bank Arena (1,273); Florence, AL
January 13, 2024; 4:30 pm, ESPN+		at Central Arkansas	L 57–59	4–15 (0–4)	Farris Center (1,043); Conway, AR
January 20, 2024; 7:00 pm, ESPN+		at Eastern Kentucky	L 70–82	4–16 (0–5)	Baptist Health Arena (3,672); Richmond, KY
January 25, 2024; 6:30 pm, ESPN+		North Florida	L 63–71	4–17 (0–6)	Freedom Hall (1,484); Louisville, KY
January 27, 2024; 4:00 pm, ESPN+		Jacksonville	W 69–63	5–17 (1–6)	Freedom Hall (3,584); Louisville, KY
February 1, 2024; 7:30 pm, ESPN+		at Kennesaw State	W 96–95 ^{OT}	6–17 (2–6)	KSU Convocation Center (1,630); Kennesaw, GA
February 3, 2024; 4:00 pm, ESPN+		at Queens	L 75–85	6–18 (2–7)	Curry Arena (773); Charlotte, NC
February 7, 2024; 6:30 pm, ESPN+		Stetson	L 77–84	6–19 (2–8)	Freedom Hall (1,523); Louisville, KY
February 10, 2024; 7:00 pm, ESPN+		at Florida Gulf Coast	L 52–63	6–20 (2–9)	Alico Arena (2,612); Fort Myers, FL
February 17, 2024; 7:00 pm, ESPN+		Eastern Kentucky	L 65–75	6–21 (2–10)	Knights Hall (2,196); Louisville, KY
February 22, 2024; 6:30 pm, ESPN+		Central Arkansas	W 68–65	7–21 (3–10)	Freedom Hall (1,483); Louisville, KY
February 24, 2024; 4:00 pm, ESPN+		North Alabama	W 82–70	8–21 (4–10)	Freedom Hall (2,749); Louisville, KY
February 28, 2024; 8:00 pm, ESPN+		at Lipscomb	L 74–90	8–22 (4–11)	Allen Arena (1,588); Nashville, TN
March 1, 2024; 8:00 pm, ESPN+		at Austin Peay	L 87–90 ^{OT}	8–23 (4–12)	F&M Bank Arena (2,681); Clarksville, TN
*Non-conference game. ^{#}Rankings from AP Poll. (#) Tournament seedings in parentheses. All times are in Eastern.
