= 2023–24 North Alabama Lions men's basketball team =

American college basketball season

2023–24 North Alabama Lions men's basketball
- Conference: ASUN Conference
- Record: 15–17 (8–8 ASUN)
- Head coach: Tony Pujol (6th season)
- Associate head coach: Ahmad Smith
- Assistant coaches: Carter Heston; Austin Burnette; Sean Foley
- Home arena: CB&S Bank Arena

2023–24 ASUN men's basketball standings
	Conf.				Overall
Team	W		L	PCT	W		L	PCT
Eastern Kentucky	12	–	4	.750	17	–	14	.548
Stetson †	11	–	5	.688	22	–	13	.629
Lipscomb	11	–	5	.688	20	–	12	.625
Austin Peay	10	–	6	.625	19	–	16	.543
North Florida	9	–	7	.563	16	–	16	.500
North Alabama	8	–	8	.500	15	–	17	.469
Florida Gulf Coast	8	–	8	.500	14	–	18	.438
Queens*	7	–	9	.438	14	–	19	.424
Kennesaw State	6	–	10	.375	15	–	16	.484
Jacksonville	5	–	11	.313	16	–	17	.485
Central Arkansas	5	–	11	.313	9	–	23	.281
Bellarmine*	4	–	12	.250	8	–	23	.258
† 2024 ASUN tournament winner * ineligible for the 2024 NCAA tournament due to transition from Division II

The 2023–24 North Alabama Lions men's basketball team represented the University of North Alabama during the 2023–24 NCAA Division I men's basketball season. The Lions were led by sixth-year head coach Tony Pujol, and played their home games at the CB&S Bank Arena located in Florence, Alabama, as members the ASUN Conference.

== Previous season ==
The Lions finished the 2022–23 season 18–13, 10–8 in ASUN play, to finish in sixth place. They lost to Eastern Kentucky in the first round of the ASUN tournament. The Lions received an invitation to play in the CBI, where they were defeated in the first round by Southern Utah, closing their season with an overall record of 18–15.

== Roster ==
2023–24 North Alabama Lions men's basketball team
Players
Coaches

Pos.	#	Name	Height	Weight	Year	Previous school	Hometown
G	0	Will Soucie	6 ft 6 in (1.98 m)	215 lb (98 kg)	Jr	Gill St. Bernard's School	Califon, NJ
G	1	Micah Clark	6 ft 7 in (2.01 m)	220 lb (100 kg)	So	Trinity Valley Community College	Lancaster, TX
G	2	Josiah Fulcher	6 ft 4 in (1.93 m)	195 lb (88 kg)	Jr	Clarendon College	Lima, OH
G	3	KJ Johnson	6 ft 3 in (1.91 m)	183 lb (83 kg)	Sr	Lipscomb	Lewisburg, TN
G	4	Canin Jefferson	6 ft 2 in (1.88 m)	170 lb (77 kg)	Fr	Isidore Newman School	New Orleans, LA
G	5	Jacari Lane	6 ft 0 in (1.83 m)	182 lb (83 kg)	So	Lee High School	Huntsville, AL
G	11	Drake James	6 ft 3 in (1.91 m)	180 lb (82 kg)	Fr	Haleyville High School	Florence, AL
G	12	Detalian Brown	6 ft 2 in (1.88 m)	190 lb (86 kg)	Jr	Combine Academy Prep	Chicago, IL
G	13	Blake Floyd	6 ft 0 in (1.83 m)	170 lb (77 kg)	So	Spain Park High School	Pelham, AL
C	15	Eoin Nelson	6 ft 11 in (2.11 m)	250 lb (113 kg)	Sr	Wyoming	Dublin, Ireland
G	21	Hugh Hargett	5 ft 11 in (1.8 m)	175 lb (79 kg)	Fr	Mars Hill Bible School	Florence, AL
G	22	Marco Foster	6 ft 2 in (1.88 m)	180 lb (82 kg)	Jr	Blinn College	Lancaster, TX
F	23	Tim Jr. Smith	6 ft 7 in (2.01 m)	230 lb (104 kg)	GS	Walsh	Cleveland, OH
F	33	Damian Forrest	6 ft 9 in (2.06 m)	245 lb (111 kg)	Sr	Cleveland State Community College	Fort Collins, CO
F	34	Dallas Howell	6 ft 7 in (2.01 m)	205 lb (93 kg)	Jr	Enterprise High School	Coffee Springs, AL
C	35	Jamal Albritton	6 ft 9 in (2.06 m)	245 lb (111 kg)	Jr	Wallace-Selma Community College	Montgomery, AL

Head coach

- Tony Pujol (Sterling)

Assistant coach(es)

- Ahmad Smith (Appalachian State)
- Carter Heston (Alabama)
- Austin Burnette (Campbell)
- Sean Foley (McDaniel)

Legend

- (C) Team captain
- (S) Suspended
- (I) Ineligible
- (W) Walk-on
- Injured
- Current redshirt

Roster
Last update: November 12, 2023

== Schedule and results ==
Date time, TV	Rank^{#}	Opponent^{#}	Result	Record	High points	High rebounds	High assists	Site (attendance) city, state
Non-conference regular season
November 6, 2023*; 7:45 p.m., ESPN+		Blue Mountain Christian	W 93–60	1–0	19 – Smith Jr.	10 – tied	4 – Jefferson	CB&S Bank Arena (1,287); Florence, AL
November 9, 2023*; 7:00 p.m., ESPN+		Alabama A&M	W 83–67	2–0	16 – Johnson	11 – Forrest	4 – Lane	CB&S Bank Arena (1,366); Florence, AL
November 14, 2023*; 7:30 p.m., ESPN+/SECN+		at Mississippi State	L 54–81	2–1	11 – tied	5 – Fulcher	2 – tied	Humphrey Coliseum (7,337); Starkville, MS
November 18, 2023*; 7:15 p.m., ESPN+		Jacksonville State	W 61–59	3–1	23 – Johnson	8 – Forrest	2 – tied	CB&S Bank Arena (1,571); Florence, AL
November 22, 2023*; 2:00 p.m., ESPN+		at UT Martin	L 103–105 ^{2OT}	3–2	27 – Johnson	8 – Forrest	8 – Lane	Skyhawk Arena (1,072); Martin, TN
November 26, 2023*; 3:00 p.m., ESPN+		at Western Carolina	L 63–81	3–3	13 – Forrest	5 – Forrest	2 – Lane	Ramsey Center (1,765); Cullowhee, NC
November 30, 2023*; 7:00 p.m., ESPN+		Tennessee Tech	W 86–71	4–3	20 – Lane	14 – Forrest	4 – Lane	CB&S Bank Arena (1,234); Florence, AL
December 2, 2023*; 1:00 p.m., ESPN+		at Kansas State	L 74–75 ^{OT}	4–4	19 – tied	10 – Forrest	11 – Lane	Bramlage Coliseum (9,528); Manhattan, KS
December 7, 2023*; 11:00 a.m., ESPN+		Rust	W 109–65	5–4	19 – Foster	9 – Smith Jr.	9 – Lane	CB&S Bank Arena (2,895); Florence, AL
December 10, 2023*; 2:00 p.m., ESPN+		Morehead State	L 77–86	5–5	28 – Lane	10 – tied	4 – Lane	CB&S Bank Arena (1,269); Florence, AL
December 13, 2023*; 6:00 p.m., ESPN+		at Charleston Southern	W 76–64	6–5	14 – tied	10 – Forrest	4 – Johnson	Buccaneer Field House (562); North Charleston, SC
December 16, 2023*; 3:00 p.m., ESPN+		at Tennessee Tech	L 67–70	6–6	17 – Howell	9 – Howell	4 – tied	Eblen Center (701); Cookeville, TN
December 21, 2023*; 7:30 p.m., B1G		at Indiana	L 66–83	6–7	14 – Howell	10 – Forrest	4 – tied	Simon Skjodt Assembly Hall (15,865); Bloomington, IN
January 1, 2024*; 1:00 p.m., ESPN+		at Texas Tech	L 57–85	6–8	19 – Lane	6 – Howell	5 – Johnson	United Supermarkets Arena (10,048); Lubbock, TX
ASUN regular season
January 6, 2024; 7:15 p.m., ESPN+		Central Arkansas	L 81–84	6–9 (0–1)	19 – Johnson	9 – Howell	6 – Lane	CB&S Bank Arena (1,756); Florence, AL
January 11, 2024; 7:45 p.m., ESPN+		Bellarmine	W 69–53	7–9 (1–1)	16 – Lane	15 – Forrest	4 – Johnson	CB&S Bank Arena (1,273); Florence, AL
January 13, 2024; 7:15 p.m., ESPN+		Eastern Kentucky	L 72–81	7–10 (1–2)	19 – Lane	8 – Forrest	8 – Lane	CB&S Bank Arena (1,738); Florence, AL
January 18, 2024; 7:00 p.m., ESPN+		at Austin Peay	L 80–83 ^{OT}	7–11 (1–3)	20 – Lane	8 – Forrest	3 – Lane	F&M Bank Arena (2,914); Clarksville, TN
January 20, 2024; 4:00 p.m., ESPN+		at Lipscomb	L 79–88	7–12 (1–4)	21 – Forrest	9 – Forrest	4 – 3 tied	Allen Arena (1,667); Nashville, TN
January 24, 2024; 6:00 p.m., ESPN+		at Kennesaw State	W 90–84	8–12 (2–4)	27 – Johnson	11 – Howell	6 – Lane	KSU Convocation Center (1,422); Kennesaw, GA
January 27, 2024; 6:00 p.m., ESPN+		Queens	W 90–84	9–12 (3–4)	27 – Lane	11 – Forrest	5 – Lane	CB&S Bank Arena (1,473); Florence, AL
February 1, 2024; 7:45 p.m., ESPN+		Stetson	W 79–72	10–12 (4–4)	19 – Forrest	10 – Smith Jr.	5 – Lane	CB&S Bank Arena (1,267); Florence, AL
February 3, 2024; 7:15 p.m., ESPN+		Florida Gulf Coast	W 70–68	11–12 (5–4)	21 – Lane	6 – Forrest	6 – Lane	CB&S Bank Arena (1,484); Florence, AL
February 8, 2024; 6:00 p.m., ESPN+		at North Florida	W 79–74	12–12 (6–4)	20 – Soucie	9 – Smith Jr.	4 – Johnson	UNF Arena (1,119); Jacksonville, FL
February 10, 2024; 2:00 p.m., ESPN+		at Jacksonville	L 63–67	12–13 (6–5)	18 – Johnson	5 – tied	2 – tied	Swisher Gymnasium (772); Jacksonville, FL
February 15, 2024; 7:45 p.m., ESPN+		Lipscomb	W 75–70	13–13 (7–5)	25 – Lane	7 – Howell	5 – Lane	CB&S Bank Arena (1,474); Florence, AL
February 17, 2024; 7:15 p.m., ESPN+		Austin Peay	L 79–87	13–14 (7–6)	18 – Lane	5 – tied	3 – tied	CB&S Bank Arena (1,990); Florence, AL
February 22, 2024; 6:00 p.m., ESPN+		at Eastern Kentucky	L 72–75	13–15 (7–7)	26 – Lane	11 – Forrest	5 – Fulcher	Baptist Health Arena (2,755); Richmond, KY
February 24, 2024; 4:00 p.m., ESPN+		at Bellarmine	L 70–82	13–16 (7–8)	17 – Soucie	12 – Forrest	2 – tied	Freedom Hall (2,749); Louisville, KY
March 1, 2024; 6:30 p.m., ESPN+		at Central Arkansas	W 82–78	14–16 (8–8)	18 – tied	7 – Forrest	5 – Johnson	Farris Center (1,445); Conway, AR
ASUN tournament
March 5, 2024; 8:00 p.m., ESPN+	(6)	at (3) Lipscomb; Quarterfinals	W 77–75	15–16	14 – Howell	10 – Forrest	4 – Lane	Allen Arena (1,982); Nashville, TN
March 7, 2024; 8:00 p.m., ESPN+	(6)	at (4) Austin Peay; Semifinals	L 71–77	15–17	19 – Forrest	9 – Forrest	5 – Lane	F&M Bank Arena (3,215); Clarksville, TN
*Non-conference game. ^{#}Rankings from AP poll. (#) Tournament seedings in parentheses. All times are in Eastern.
