= Donnie Jones (basketball) =

American basketball coach (born 1966)

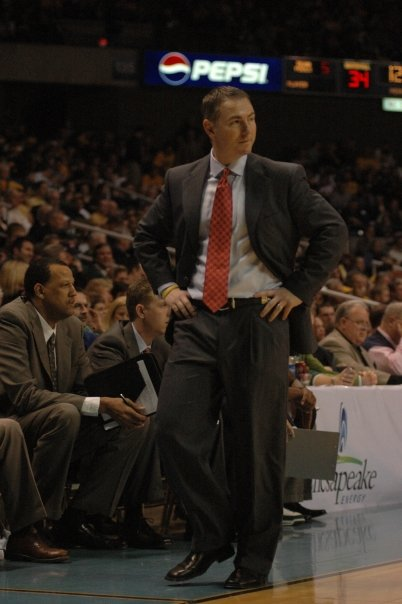
- Jones in 2008

Current position
- Title: Head coach
- Team: Stetson
- Conference: Atlantic Sun
- Record: 99–128 (.436)

Biographical details
- Born: July 7, 1966 (age 60); Point Pleasant, West Virginia, U.S.

Playing career
- 1984–1988: Pikeville

Coaching career (HC unless noted)
- 1988–1990: Pikeville (assistant)
- 1990–1996: Marshall (assistant)
- 1996–2007: Florida (assistant)
- 2007–2010: Marshall
- 2010–2016: UCF
- 2017–2018: Wichita State (assistant)
- 2018–2019: Dayton (assistant)
- 2019–present: Stetson

Head coaching record
- Overall: 254–257 (.497)
- Tournaments: 0–1 (NCAA Division I); 0–1 (NIT); 3–3 (CBI); 1–1 (CIT)

Accomplishments and honors

Championships
- ASUN tournament (2024)

Donald Isaac Jones Sr. (born July 7, 1966) is an American college basketball coach and former college basketball player. He is currently the men's head basketball coach at Stetson University. For the 2023-24 season, Jones led Stetson University to its first NCAA Tournament appearance in school history. Prior to Stetson, Jones served as the head coach of the UCF Knights men's basketball team from 2010 to 2016 and at Marshall from 2007 to 2010.

After spending three years as head coach at Marshall, amassing a 55–41 record, Jones was hired by UCF after the university decided not to retain Kirk Speraw for the 2010–11 season. Before Marshall, Jones was an assistant with the Florida Gators for 11 seasons, and was hired by Marshall after he helped Billy Donovan coach the Gators to consecutive national championships in 2006 and 2007. Afterwards, Jones joined the Knights in 2010, serving as their third head coach since entering into Division I play. On March 10, 2016, Jones was replaced after the team's first round loss in the American Athletic Conference tournament.

In the 2016–17 season, Jones worked as a scout for the Los Angeles Clippers of the NBA. Jones returned to college coaching in April 2017 as an assistant at Wichita State under Gregg Marshall.

In July 2018, Jones was hired by the University of Dayton as assistant coach under Anthony Grant. The 2 previously served together as assistant coaches at Marshall from 1994 to 1996 and at Florida from 1996 to 2006.

On March 29, 2019, Jones was named the 22nd head coach at Stetson University.

== Head coaching record ==
Record table
| Season | Team | Overall | Conference | Standing | Postseason |
|---|---|---|---|---|---|
Marshall Thundering Herd (Conference USA) (2007–2010)
| 2007–08 | Marshall | 16–14 | 8–8 | 8th | |
| 2008–09 | Marshall | 15–17 | 7–9 | 7th | |
| 2009–10 | Marshall | 24–10 | 11–5 | 4th | CIT Quarterfinals |
| Marshall: | | 55–41 (.573) | 26–22 (.542) | | |
UCF Knights (Conference USA) (2010–2013)
| 2010–11* | UCF | 21–12* | 6–10* | 9th* | CBI Semifinals |
| 2011–12 | UCF | 22–11 | 10–6 | 4th | NIT First Round |
| 2012–13 | UCF | 20–11 | 9–7 | 4th | |
UCF Knights (American Athletic Conference) (2013–2016)
| 2013–14 | UCF | 13–18 | 4–14 | 9th | |
| 2014–15 | UCF | 12–18 | 5–13 | 9th | |
| 2015–16 | UCF | 12–18 | 6–12 | 7th | |
| UCF: | | 100–88* (.532) | 44–61 (.419) | | |
Stetson Hatters (Atlantic Sun Conference) (2019–present)
| 2019–20 | Stetson | 16–17 | 9–7 | T–3rd | No postseason held |
| 2020–21 | Stetson | 12–15 | 7–9 | 7th | CBI Semifinal |
| 2021–22 | Stetson | 11–19 | 5–11 | 5th (East) | |
| 2022–23 | Stetson | 17–14 | 12–6 | T–3rd | CBI First Round |
| 2023–24 | Stetson | 22–13 | 11–5 | T–2nd | NCAA Division I Round of 64 |
| 2024–25 | Stetson | 8–24 | 6–12 | 9th | |
| 2025–26 | Stetson | 12–21 | 7–11 | T–7th | |
| 2026–27 | Stetson | 1–5 | 0–0 | | |
| Stetson: | | 99–128 (.436) | 57–61 (.483) | | |
| Total: | | 254–257 (.497) | | | |
National champion Postseason invitational champion Conference regular season champion Conference regular season and conference tournament champion Division regular season champion Division regular season and conference tournament champion Conference tournament champion

* UCF had its wins from the 2010–11 season vacated after it was ruled that there was an ineligible player for the Knights.

== Personal life ==
Jones is married to Michelle Jones. They have three children.
