= Florida Gulf Coast Eagles men's basketball statistical leaders =

The Florida Gulf Coast Eagles men's basketball statistical leaders are individual statistical leaders of the Florida Gulf Coast Eagles men's basketball program in various categories, including points, rebounds, assists, steals, and blocks. Within those areas, the lists identify single-game, single-season, and career leaders. The Eagles represent Florida Gulf Coast University in the NCAA's ASUN Conference.

Florida Gulf Coast began competing in intercollegiate basketball in 2002. These lists are updated through the end of the 2023–24 season.

== Scoring ==
Career
Rk	Player	Points	Seasons
1	Bernard Thompson	1835	2011–12 2012–13 2013–14 2014–15
2	Brett Comer	1477	2011–12 2012–13 2013–14 2014–15
3	Ryan Hopkins	1367	2002–03 2003–04 2004–05
4	Zach Johnson	1344	2015–16 2016–17 2017–18
5	Christian Terrell	1312	2014–15 2015–16 2016–17 2017–18
6	Chase Fieler	1306	2010–11 2011–12 2012–13 2013–14
7	Brandon Goodwin	1261	2016–17 2017–18
8	Caleb Catto	1296	2018–19 2019–20 2020–21 2021–22 2022–23
9	Sherwood Brown	1241	2009–10 2010–11 2011–12 2012–13
10	Casey Wohlleb	1086	2005–06 2006–07 2007–08

Season
Rk	Player	Points	Season
1	Tavian Dunn-Martin	705	2021–22
2	Brandon Goodwin	632	2017–18
3	Brandon Goodwin	629	2016–17
4	Marc-Eddy Norelia	597	2015–16
5	Ryan Hopkins	580	2002–03
6	Sherwood Brown	574	2012–13
7	Zach Johnson	564	2017–18
8	Bernard Thompson	529	2012–13
9	Casey Wohlleb	513	2007–08
10	Dallion Johnson	504	2024–25

Single game
Rk	Player	Points	Season	Opponent
1	Tavian Dunn-Martin	43	2021–22	Liberty
2	Jordan Ellerbee	42	2025–26	Kennesaw State
3	Tavian Dunn-Martin	38	2021–22	Stetson
4	Leighton Bowie	37	2003–04	Illinois Wesleyan
	Ryan Hopkins	37	2002–03	Florida College
	Ryan Hopkins	37	2002–03	Plymouth State College
	Zach Johnson	37	2017–18	Lipscomb
8	Ryan Hopkins	36	2004–05	Fairmont State
9	Schadrac Casimir	34	2018–19	Kennesaw State
	Tavian Dunn-Martin	34	2021–22	Central Ark.
	Tavian Dunn-Martin	34	2021–22	Loyola Chicago
	Brandon Goodwin	34	2017–18	Lipscomb
	Marc-Eddy Norelia	34	2015–16	Youngstown State
	Bernard Thompson	34	2014–15	Ohio
	Robinson Tisme	34	2002–03	Calumet College

== Rebounds ==
Career
Rk	Player	Rebounds	Seasons
1	Chase Fieler	714	2010–11 2011–12 2012–13 2013–14
2	Bernard Thompson	623	2011–12 2012–13 2013–14 2014–15
3	Marc-Eddy Norelia	611	2014–15 2015–16 2016–17
4	Sherwood Brown	589	2009–10 2010–11 2011–12 2012–13
5	Adam Liddell	570	2005–06 2006–07 2007–08
6	Zach Anderson	540	2020–21 2021–22 2022–23 2023–24
7	Caleb Catto	538	2018–19 2019–20 2020–21 2021–22 2022–23
8	Demetris Morant	536	2014–15 2015–16 2016–17
9	Cyrus Largie	510	2019–20 2020–21 2021–22 2022–23 2023–24
10	Christian Terrell	507	2014–15 2015–16 2016–17 2017–18

Season
Rk	Player	Rebounds	Season
1	Marc-Eddy Norelia	325	2015–16
2	Kevin Samuel	319	2021–22
3	Adam Liddell	274	2006–07
4	Demetris Morant	269	2016–17
5	Chase Fieler	260	2013–14
6	Sherwood Brown	242	2012–13
7	Robinson Tisme	237	2002–03
8	Derrick O'Neil	226	2008–09
	Keeshawn Kellman	226	2024–25
10	Keeshawn Kellman	223	2023–24

Single game
Rk	Player	Rebounds	Season	Opponent
1	Nate Hicks	19	2013–14	USF
	Adam Liddell	19	2006–07	Marygrove
3	Adam Liddell	18	2005–06	Apprentice School
	Marc-Eddy Norelia	18	2015–16	Youngstown State
	Christian Terrell	18	2015–16	Youngstown State
6	Demetris Morant	17	2016–17	Jacksonville
	Demetris Morant	17	2016–17	Georgia Southern
8	Derrick O'Neil	16	2008–09	Stetson
	Robinson Tisme	16	2002–03	Calumet College
10	Chase Fieler	15	2013–14	ETSU
	Adam Liddell	15	2006–07	Puerto Rico-Cayey
	Marc-Eddy Norelia	15	2016–17	Stetson
	Kevin Samuel	15	2021–22	Liberty
	Andre Weir	15	2022–23	North Florida
	J.R. Konieczny	15	2025–26	North Alabama

== Assists ==
Career
Rk	Player	Assists	Seasons
1	Brett Comer	845	2011–12 2012–13 2013–14 2014–15
2	Bryan Crislip	606	2002–03 2003–04 2004–05
3	Caleb Catto	360	2018–19 2019–20 2020–21 2021–22 2022–23
4	Rahmir Barno	338	2023–24 2024–25 2025–26
5	Rob Quaintance	337	2006–07 2007–08
6	Zach Johnson	321	2015–16 2016–17 2017–18
7	Brandon Goodwin	301	2016–17 2017–18
8	Christian Terrell	291	2014–15 2015–16 2016–17 2017–18
9	Bernard Thompson	246	2011–12 2012–13 2013–14 2014–15
10	Gabe Pean	225	2002–03 2003–04 2004–05 2005–06

Season
Rk	Player	Assists	Season
1	Bryan Crislip	255	2002–03
2	Brett Comer	244	2012–13
3	Brett Comer	236	2014–15
4	Tavian Dunn-Martin	198	2021–22
5	Brett Comer	187	2013–14
6	Brett Comer	178	2011–12
7	Bryan Crislip	176	2003–04
8	Bryan Crislip	175	2004–05
9	Rob Quaintance	174	2007–08
10	Rahmir Barno	169	2025–26

Single game
Rk	Player	Assists	Season	Opponent
1	Bryan Crislip	16	2002–03	Johnson & Wales
	Bryan Crislip	16	2002–03	Tri State University
	Bryan Crislip	16	2002–03	Anderson University
4	Bryan Crislip	15	2002–03	Florida College
	Bryan Crislip	15	2003–04	Illinois Wesleyan
6	Brett Comer	14	2012–13	San Diego State
	Brett Comer	14	2014–15	Massachusetts
	Bryan Crislip	14	2003–04	Kentucky Wesleyan
9	Rahmir Barno	13	2025–26	Florida International
	Bryan Crislip	13	2002–03	WV State College
	Tavian Dunn-Martin	13	2021–22	Kennesaw St.
	Tavian Dunn-Martin	13	2021–22	Southeastern La
	Rob Quaintance	13	2007–08	Kennesaw State

== Steals ==
Career
Rk	Player	Steals	Seasons
1	Bernard Thompson	262	2011–12 2012–13 2013–14 2014–15
2	Bryan Crislip	194	2002–03 2003–04 2004–05
3	Brett Comer	181	2011–12 2012–13 2013–14 2014–15
4	Rob Quaintance	155	2006–07 2007–08
5	Zach Johnson	146	2015–16 2016–17 2017–18
6	Caleb Catto	137	2018–19 2019–20 2020–21 2021–22 2022–23
7	Sherwood Brown	120	2009–10 2010–11 2011–12 2012–13
8	Yavney Neptune	117	2004–05 2005–06 2006–07 2007–08
9	Rahmir Barno	116	2023–24 2024–25 2025–26
10	Cyrus Largie	109	2019–20 2020–21 2021–22 2022–23 2023–24

Season
Rk	Player	Steals	Season
1	Bernard Thompson	102	2012–13
2	Bryan Crislip	78	2002–03
	Rob Quaintance	78	2007–08
4	Rob Quaintance	77	2006–07
5	Zach Johnson	70	2017–18
6	Bryan Crislip	62	2003–04
7	Brett Comer	58	2012–13
8	Bernard Thompson	57	2011–12
9	Bernard Thompson	55	2014–15
	Beau Bauer	55	2006–07

Single game
Rk	Player	Steals	Season	Opponent
1	Bryan Crislip	8	2002–03	Clearwater Christian
2	Reed Baker	7	2008–09	ETSU
	Rob Quaintance	7	2007–08	Stetson
	Rob Quaintance	7	2006–07	Puerto Rico-Bayamon
5	Reed Baker	6	2010–11	North Florida
	Bryan Crislip	6	2002–03	Johnson & Wales
	Dajuan Graf	6	2013–14	Stetson
	Adam Liddell	6	2007–08	Pennsylvania
	Derrick O'Neil	6	2008–09	Jacksonville
	Rob Quaintance	6	2006–07	Florida Southern
	Rob Quaintance	6	2006–07	Lynn
	Zach Scott	6	2019–20	North Dakota
	Bernard Thompson	6	2012–13	Stetson
	Bernard Thompson	6	2012–13	Stetson
	Bernard Thompson	6	2013–14	ETSU
	Rahmir Barno	6	2024–25	Florida Tech

== Blocks ==
Career
Rk	Player	Blocks	Seasons
1	Chase Fieler	134	2010–11 2011–12 2012–13 2013–14
2	Dakota Rivers	132	2019–20 2020–21 2021–22 2022–23 2023–24
3	Demetris Morant	122	2014–15 2015–16 2016–17
4	Kevin Samuel	96	2021–22
5	Brian Thomas	84	2017–18 2018–19 2019–20
6	Kyle Marks	79	2008–09 2009–10
7	Adam Liddell	74	2005–06 2006–07 2007–08
8	Eric McKnight	72	2012–13 2013–14
9	Keeshawn Kellman	71	2023–24 2024–25
10	Nate Hicks	67	2013–14 2014–15

Season
Rk	Player	Blocks	Season
1	Kevin Samuel	96	2021–22
2	Isaiah Malone	64	2025–26
3	Kyle Marks	51	2008–09
4	Chase Fieler	49	2012–13
5	Demetris Morant	48	2016–17
6	Eric McKnight	47	2012–13
7	Brian Thomas	44	2018–19
8	Demetris Morant	42	2014–15
	Nate Hicks	42	2013–14
10	Dakota Rivers	39	2019–20

Single game
Rk	Player	Blocks	Season	Opponent
1	Nate Hicks	8	2013–14	Eckerd
	Brian Thomas	8	2019–20	Lipscomb
3	Demetris Morant	7	2014–15	Stetson
	Kevin Samuel	7	2021–22	Stetson
5	Dakota Rivers	6	2020–21	Webber Int'l
	Kyle Marks	6	2008–09	Mercer
	Kevin Martin	6	2004–05	University of North F
	Kevin Samuel	6	2021–22	Southeastern La.
	Brian Thomas	6	2018–19	Lipscomb
	Isaiah Malone	6	2025–26	Fort Lauderdale
