= List of Florida Gulf Coast Eagles men's basketball seasons =

The Florida Gulf Coast Eagles college basketball team competes in the National Collegiate Athletic Association (NCAA) Division I, representing the Florida Gulf Coast University in the ASUN Conference. The Eagles play their home games at the Alico Arena in Fort Myers, Florida.

== Seasons ==
Conference champions *	Conference tournament champions †	Postseason berth ‡

Season	Head coach	Conference	Season results							Conference tournament	Postseason result	Final AP Poll	Final Coaches Poll
Season	Head coach	Conference	Overall			Conference				Conference tournament	Postseason result	Final AP Poll	Final Coaches Poll
Season	Head coach	Conference	Wins	Losses	%	Wins	Losses	%	Finish	Conference tournament	Postseason result	Final AP Poll	Final Coaches Poll
Florida Gulf Coast Eagles
2002–03	Dave Balza	Independent	23	9	.719	—	—	—	—	—	—	—	—
2003–04	Dave Balza	Independent	22	5	.815	—	—	—	—	—	—	—	—
2004–05	Dave Balza	Independent	24	7	.774	—	—	—	—	—	NCAA 1st Round (Division II)	—	—
2005–06	Dave Balza	Independent	18	12	.600	—	—	—	—	—	—	—	—
2006–07	Dave Balza	Independent	27	6	.818	—	—	—	—	—	—	—	—
2007–08	Dave Balza	ASUN	10	21	.323	6	10	.375	T–8th	—	—	—	—
2008–09	Dave Balza	ASUN	11	20	.355	7	13	.350	9th	—	—	—	—
2009–10	Dave Balza	ASUN	8	21	.276	5	15	.250	T–10th	—	—	—	—
2010–11	Dave Balza	ASUN	10	20	.333	7	13	.350	7th	—	—	—	—
2011–12	Andy Enfield	ASUN	15	17	.469	8	10	.444	T–6th	Finalist	—	—	—
2012–13	Andy Enfield	ASUN	26	11	.703	13	5	.722	2nd	Champion	NCAA Sweet Sixteen	—	25
2013–14	Joe Dooley	ASUN	22	13	.629	14	4	.778	T–1st	Finalist	NIT First Round	—	—
2014–15	Joe Dooley	ASUN	22	11	.667	11	3	.786	2nd	Semifinals	CIT First Round	—	—
2015–16	Joe Dooley	ASUN	21	14	.600	8	6	.571	T–2nd	Champion	NCAA First Round	—	—
2016–17	Joe Dooley	ASUN	26	8	.765	12	2	.857	1st	Champion	NCAA First Round	—	—
2017–18	Joe Dooley	ASUN	23	11	.676	12	2	.857	1st	Finalist	NIT First Round	—	—
2018–19	Michael Fly	ASUN	14	18	.438	9	7	.563	T–3rd	Quarterfinals	—	—	—
2019–20	Michael Fly	ASUN	10	22	.313	7	8	.438	T–6th	Quarterfinals	—	—	—
2020–21	Michael Fly	ASUN	10	8	.556	4	5	.444	6th	Semifinals	—	—	—
2021–22	Michael Fly	ASUN	22	12	.556	10	6	.444	3rd (East)	Quarterfinals	TBC second round	—	—
2022–23	Pat Chambers	ASUN	17	15	.531	7	11	.389	T–9th	First round	—	—	—
2023–24	Pat Chambers	ASUN	14	18	.438	8	8	.500	T–6th	First round	—	—	—
2024–25	Pat Chambers	ASUN	19	15	.559	13	5	.722	3rd	Semifinals	CBI Semifinals	—	—
2025–26	Pat Chambers	ASUN	16	18	.471	8	10	.444	T–5th	Semifinals	—	—	—
Totals	—	—	430	332	.564	169	144	.540	—	3 Tournament titles	3 NCAA appearances	—	—
