= List of Florida Gulf Coast Eagles men's basketball head coaches =

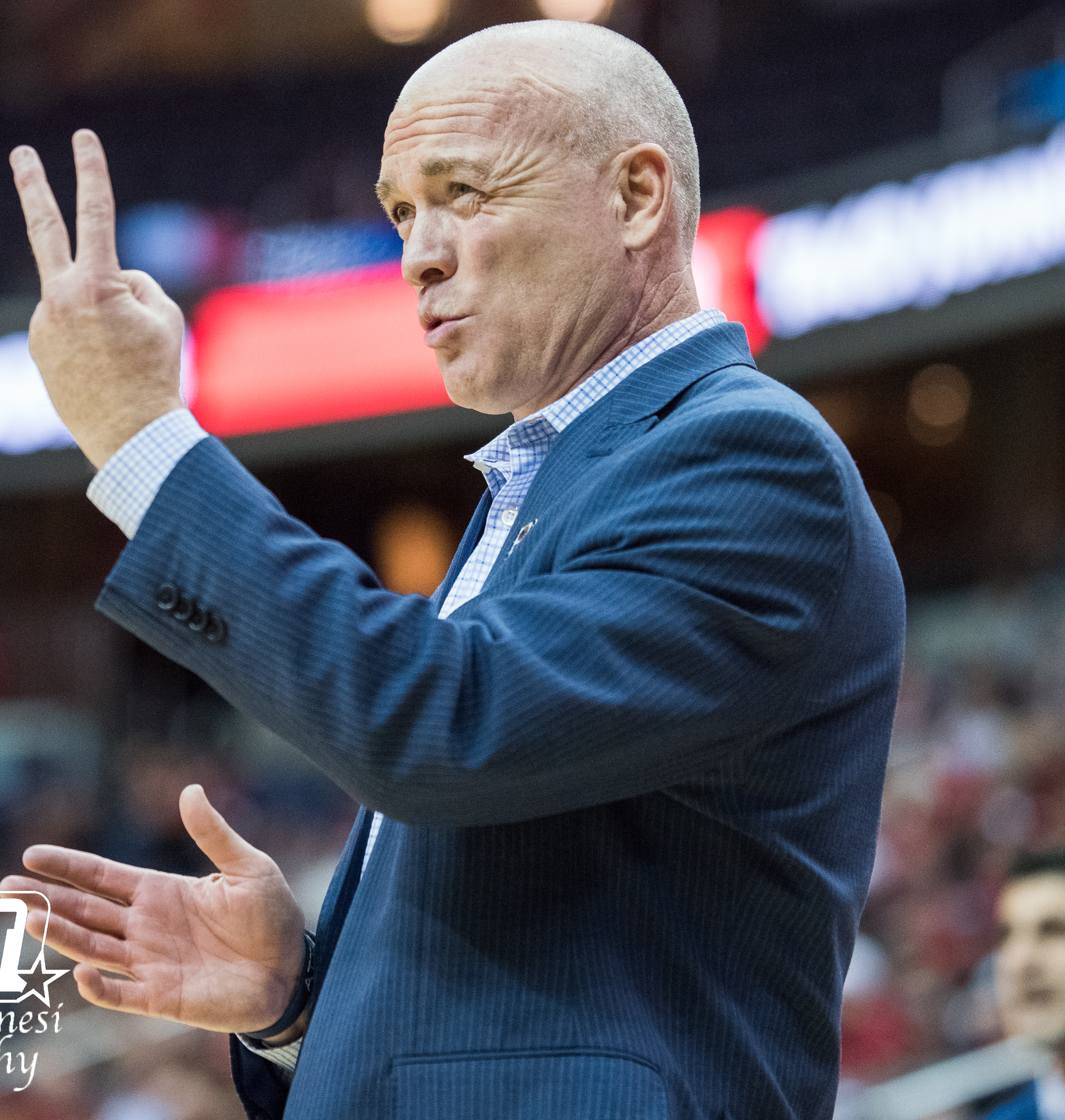
Pat Chambers, the current head coach of the Florida Gulf Coast Eagles.

The following is a list of Florida Gulf Coast Eagles men's basketball head coaches. There have been five head coaches of the Eagles in their 21-season history.

Florida Gulf Coast's current head coach is Pat Chambers. He was hired as the Eagles' head coach in March 2022, replacing Michael Fly, who was fired after the 2021–22 season.

No.	Tenure	Coach	Years	Record	Pct.
1	2002–2011	Dave Balza	9	149–125	.544
2	2011–2013	Andy Enfield	2	41–28	.594
3	2013–2018	Joe Dooley	5	114–59	.659
4	2018–2022	Michael Fly	4	56–60	.483
5	2022–present	Pat Chambers	1	17–15	.531
Totals		5 coaches	21 seasons	377–287	.568
Records updated through end of 2022–23 season Source
