= 2014–15 Florida Gulf Coast Eagles men's basketball team =

American college basketball season

2014–15 Florida Gulf Coast Eagles men's basketball
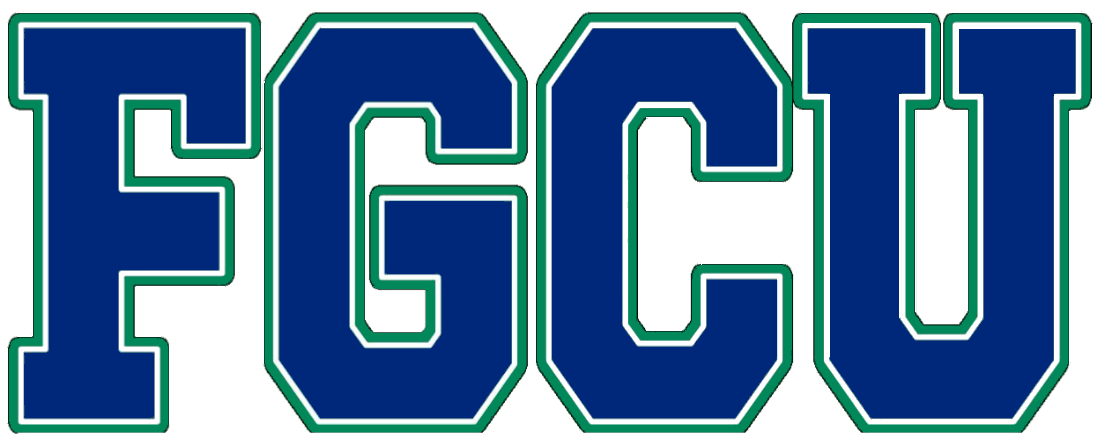

CIT, First round
- Conference: Atlantic Sun Conference
- Record: 22–11 (11–3 A-Sun)
- Head coach: Joe Dooley (2nd season)
- Assistant coaches: Marty Richter (4th season); Michael Fly (4th season); Jamill Jones (2nd season)
- Home arena: Alico Arena

2014–15 Atlantic Sun men's basketball standings
	Conf.				Overall
Team	W		L	PCT	W		L	PCT
North Florida †	12	–	2	.857	23	–	12	.657
Florida Gulf Coast	11	–	3	.786	22	–	11	.667
USC Upstate	8	–	6	.571	24	–	12	.667
Lipscomb	7	–	7	.500	14	–	17	.452
Northern Kentucky*	7	–	7	.500	13	–	17	.433
Jacksonville	4	–	10	.286	10	–	22	.313
Kennesaw State	4	–	10	.286	10	–	22	.313
Stetson	3	–	11	.214	9	–	22	.290
† 2015 Atlantic Sun Tournament winner *NKU was eligible for A-Sun Tourney, but not for postseason play due to Div. I transition

The 2014–15 Florida Gulf Coast Eagles men's basketball team represented Florida Gulf Coast University (FGCU) in the 2014–15 NCAA Division I men's basketball season. FGCU was a member of the Atlantic Sun Conference. They played their home games at Alico Arena and were led by second year head coach Joe Dooley. They finished the season 22–11, 12–3 in A-Sun play to finish in second place. They advanced to the semifinals of the A-Sun tournament where they lost to USC Upstate. They received an invitation to the CollegeInsider.com Tournament where they lost in the first round to Texas A&M–Corpus Christi.

== Pre-season ==
Departures

Player	Previous Institution	New Institution
Chase Fieler	FGCU	Graduated
Dajuan Graf	FGCU	North Carolina Central
Eric McKnight	FGCU	Tennessee
Kevin Boyle	FGCU	N/A

Class of 2014 Signees

College recruiting information
Name	Hometown	School	Height	Weight	Commit date
Zach Johnson; SG	Miami, FL	Miami Norland	6 ft 2 in (1.88 m)	180 lb (82 kg)	Oct 21, 2013
Zach Johnson; SG	Recruit ratings: Scout: Rivals: (66)				
Eric Moeller; C	Ocala, FL	College of Central Florida	6 ft 11 in (2.11 m)	220 lb (100 kg)	Oct 17, 2013
Eric Moeller; C	Recruit ratings: No ratings found				
Demetris Morant; F	Las Vegas, NV	UNLV	6 ft 9 in (2.06 m)	210 lb (95 kg)	May 21, 2014
Demetris Morant; F	Recruit ratings: Scout: Rivals:				
Christian Terrell; SG	Jacksonville, FL	Providence School	6 ft 3 in (1.91 m)	180 lb (82 kg)	Oct 21, 2013
Christian Terrell; SG	Recruit ratings: No ratings found				
Overall recruit ranking:
Note: In many cases, Scout, Rivals, 247Sports, On3, and ESPN may conflict in their listings of height and weight.; In these cases, the average was taken. ESPN grades are on a 100-point scale.; Sources: "2014 Florida Gulf Coast Signees". Rivals.; "2014 Florida Gulf Coast Signees". ESPN.; "2014 Team Ranking". Rivals.

== Roster ==
2014–15 Florida Gulf Coast Eagles men's basketball team
Players
Coaches

Pos.	#	Name	Height	Weight	Year	Previous school	Hometown
G	0	Brett Comer	6 ft 3 in (1.91 m)	192 lb (87 kg)	Sr	Winter Park High School	Winter Park, Florida
F/C	1	Nate Hicks	6 ft 10 in (2.08 m)	217 lb (98 kg)	RS Sr	J. R. Arnold High School	Panama City Beach, Florida
G	2	Bernard Thompson	6 ft 3 in (1.91 m)	166 lb (75 kg)	Sr	Rockdale County High School	Conyers, Georgia
G	3	Julian DeBose	6 ft 4 in (1.93 m)	196 lb (89 kg)	RS Jr	St. John's College High School	Washington, D.C.
G	4	Armand Shoon (W)	6 ft 3 in (1.91 m)	180 lb (82 kg)	So	Westwood Christian School	Miami, Florida
G	5	Jamail Jones	6 ft 6 in (1.98 m)	215 lb (98 kg)	RS Sr	Montverde Academy	Atlanta, Georgia
F	10	Logan Hovey	6 ft 7 in (2.01 m)	210 lb (95 kg)	RS Fr	Paul J. Hagerty High School	Orlando, Florida
F	11	Nick Pellar (W)	6 ft 6 in (1.98 m)	205 lb (93 kg)	Jr	IMG Academy	Munster, Indiana
G	12	Zach Johnson (injured) (redshirt)	6 ft 2 in (1.88 m)	180 lb (82 kg)	Fr	Miami Norland	Miami, Florida
G	14	Brian Greene Jr.	6 ft 3 in (1.91 m)	205 lb (93 kg)	RS So	IMG Academy	Chicago, Illinois
F	15	Filip Cvjeticanin (injured) (redshirt)	6 ft 9 in (2.06 m)	218 lb (99 kg)	Sr	The American School of Madrid	Zagreb, Croatia
F	21	Demetris Morant	6 ft 9 in (2.06 m)	210 lb (95 kg)	RS So	Bishop Gorman	Las Vegas, NV
F	23	TeJai Allen (W)	6 ft 4 in (1.93 m)	198 lb (90 kg)	So	Fleming Island High School	Jacksonville, FL
F	24	Marcus Blake (W)	6 ft 7 in (2.01 m)	196 lb (89 kg)	RS Sr	American Heritage School	Miami, Florida
F	25	Marc-Eddy Norelia	6 ft 8 in (2.03 m)	225 lb (102 kg)	RS So	Olympia High School	Orlando, Florida
G	35	Christian Terrell	6 ft 3 in (1.91 m)	180 lb (82 kg)	Fr	Providence School	Jacksonville, Florida
F	42	Eric Moeller	6 ft 11 in (2.11 m)	220 lb (100 kg)	So	College of Central Florida	Ocala, Florida
F		Antravious Simmons (I)	6 ft 9 in (2.06 m)	250 lb (113 kg)	RS Fr	South Miami High School	Miami, Florida

Head coach

- Joe Dooley (George Washington)

Assistant coach(es)

- Marty Richter (Simpson)
- Michael Fly (Kentucky)
- Jamill Jones (Arkansas Tech)

Legend

- (C) Team captain
- (S) Suspended
- (I) Ineligible
- (W) Walk-on
- Injured
- Current redshirt

Roster
Last update: February 22, 2014

== Schedule ==
Date time, TV	Rank^{#}	Opponent^{#}	Result	Record	Site (attendance) city, state
Non-conference regular season
11/15/2014*; 2:00 pm, ESPN3		Nova Southeastern	W 63–51	1–0	Alico Arena (4,582); Fort Myers, FL
11/17/2014*; 7:00 pm, ESPN3		UC Santa Barbara	W 81–75 ^{OT}	2–0	Alico Arena (4,412); Fort Myers, FL
11/19/2014*; 7:00 pm, ESPN3		Ohio	W 79–62	3–0	Alico Arena (4,633); Fort Myers, FL
11/24/2014*; 6:00 pm, ASun.tv		vs. Marist; Gulf Coast Showcase quarterfinals	W 58–43	4–0	Germain Arena (2,118); Estero, FL
11/25/2014*; 8:30 pm, ASun.tv		vs. San Francisco; Gulf Coast Showcase semifinals	W 62–47	5–0	Germain Arena (3,027); Estero, FL
11/26/2014*; 8:30 pm, ASun.tv		vs. Green Bay; Gulf Coast Showcase finals	L 45–59	5–1	Germain Arena (3,867); Estero, FL
11/30/2014*; 5:00 pm, FSNOR		at South Dakota State	W 71–58	6–1	Frost Arena (3,250); Brookings, SD
12/03/2014*; 7:00 pm, ESPN3		Florida Tech	W 77–58	7–1	Alico Arena (4,028); Fort Myers, FL
12/07/2014*; 2:00 pm		vs. Massachusetts; Hall of Fame Holiday Classic	W 84–75	8–1	MassMutual Center (5,235); Springfield, MA
12/14/2014*; 2:00 pm, ESPN3		FIU	L 63–69	8–2	Alico Arena (3,511); Fort Myers, FL
12/19/2014*; 7:30 pm, ESPN3		Furman	W 83–78	9–2	Alico Arena (4,251); Fort Myers, FL
12/23/2014*; 7:00 pm		at Iona	L 67–86	9–3	Hynes Athletic Center (1,913); New Rochelle, NY
12/28/2014*; 4:00 pm, FS1		at Xavier	L 57–71	9–4	Cintas Center (9,908); Cincinnati, OH
12/30/2014*; 7:30 pm, ESPN3		at Pittsburgh	L 54–71	9–5	Peterson Events Center (10,249); Pittsburgh, PA
01/02/2015*; 7:00 pm, ESPN3		Ave Maria	W 49–36	10–5	Alico Arena (4,071); Fort Myers, FL
01/05/2015*; 10:00 pm		at UC Santa Barbara	L 50–63	10–6	The Thunderdome (2,887); Santa Barbara, CA
Atlantic Sun regular season
01/10/2015; 7:00 pm, ESPN3		Stetson	W 72–50	11–6 (1–0)	Alico Arena (4,633); Fort Myers, FL
01/14/2015; 7:00 pm, ESPN3		at North Florida	L 64–80	11–7 (1–1)	UNF Arena (3,189); Jacksonville, FL
01/17/2015; 7:00 pm, ESPN3		Jacksonville	W 79–50	12–7 (2–1)	Alico Arena (4,663); Fort Myers, FL
01/22/2015; 7:00 pm, ESPN3		at USC Upstate	W 71–68	13–7 (3–1)	G. B. Hodge Center (837); Spartanburg, SC
01/24/2015; 2:00 pm, ESPN3		at Kennesaw State	W 54–48	14–7 (4–1)	KSU Convocation Center (1,437); Kennesaw, GA
01/29/2015; 7:00 pm, ESPN3		Lipscomb	W 78–62	15–7 (5–1)	Alico Arena (4,177); Fort Myers, FL
01/31/2015; 7:00 pm, ESPN3		Northern Kentucky	W 74–64	16–7 (6–1)	Alico Arena (4,550); Fort Myers, FL
02/07/2015; 3:30 pm		at Stetson	W 67–51	17–7 (7–1)	Edmunds Center (2,642); DeLand, FL
02/12/2015; 7:00 pm		at Northern Kentucky	W 65–59	18–7 (8–1)	The Bank of Kentucky Center (2,226); Highland Heights, KY
02/14/2015; 7:00 pm, ESPN3		at Lipscomb	W 76–74	19–7 (9–1)	Allen Arena (1,213); Nashville, TN
02/19/2015; 7:00 pm, ESPN3		Kennesaw State	W 54–53	20–7 (10–1)	Alico Arena (4,633); Fort Myers, FL
02/21/2015; 7:00 pm, ESPN3		USC Upstate	W 86–72	21–7 (11–1)	Alico Arena (4,633); Fort Myers, FL
02/25/2015; 7:00 pm, ESPN3		North Florida	L 62–76	21–8 (11–2)	Alico Arena (4,692); Fort Myers, FL
02/28/2015; 2:00 pm		at Jacksonville	L 67–75	21–9 (11–3)	Swisher Gymnasium (477); Jacksonville, FL
Atlantic Sun tournament
03/03/2015; 7:00 pm, ESPN3	(2)	(7) Jacksonville; Quarterfinals	W 81–63	22–9	Alico Arena (3,567); Fort Myers, FL
03/05/2015; 7:00 pm, ESPN3	(2)	(3) USC Upstate; Semifinals	L 62–63	22–10	Alico Arena (4,267); Fort Myers, FL
CIT
03/18/2015*; 7:00 pm, ESPN3		Texas A&M–Corpus Christi; First round	L 69–75	22–11	Alico Arena (2,587); Fort Myers, FL
*Non-conference game. ^{#}Rankings from AP Poll. (#) Tournament seedings in parentheses. All times are in Eastern Time.
