= Brett Comer =

American basketball coach

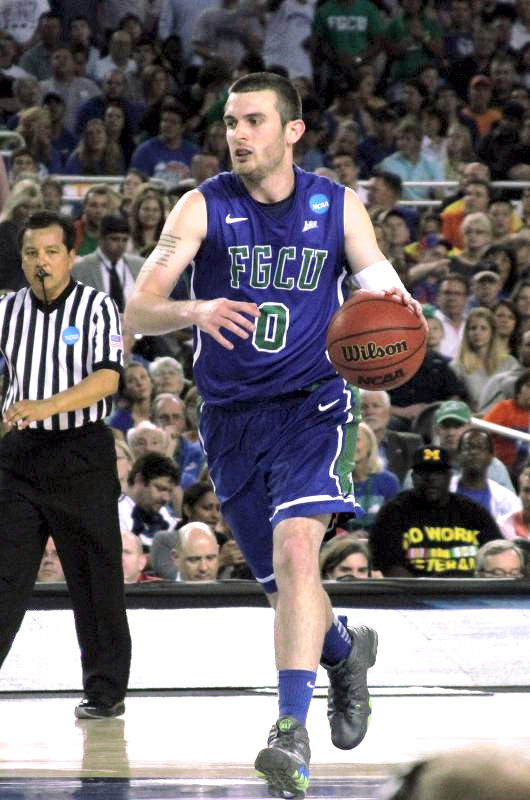
- Comer in 2013

Current position
- Title: Assistant coach
- Team: Jacksonville
- Conference: ASUN

Biographical details
- Born: May 9, 1992 (age 34)

Playing career
- 2011–2015: Florida Gulf Coast

Coaching career (HC unless noted)
- 2015–2017: IUP (assistant)
- 2017–2019: Dayton (graduate assistant)
- 2019–2022: Dayton (director of player development)
- 2022–2025: Stetson (assistant)
- 2025–present: Jacksonville (assistant)

Accomplishments and honors

Awards
- As player: 2× First-team All-ASUN (2014, 2015)

Brett Comer (born May 9, 1992) is an American college basketball coach and former player. He is currently an assistant coach at Jacksonville and played for the Florida Gulf Coast Eagles during their "Dunk City" NCAA tournament run in 2013.

== Playing career ==
Comer is from Florida and went to Winter Park High School, where the basketball team won two state championships during his career.

As a freshman, Comer was the point guard for the Florida Gulf Coast Eagles during their "Dunk City" NCAA tournament success. He played with Chase Fieler and Sherwood Brown. "Dunk City," Comer and his teammates were called "the biggest story in sports" for the week of the NCAA tournament.

After winning the 2013 Atlantic Sun championship, the team went on a run in the 2013 NCAA Men's Division I Basketball Tournament. In the Round of 64, the Eagles defeated the #2 seed Georgetown 78–68. It was only the seventh time that a 15th seed had defeated a 2nd seed, and the second-highest margin of victory for one. Two days later in the Round of 32, the Eagles defeated the #7 seed San Diego State 81–71, becoming the first time a 15th seed had ever advanced to the Sweet 16. Their run ended there in a 62–50 loss to third seeded Florida.

Comer played a total of four seasons at FGCU from 2011 to 2015. He was named to the Atlantic Sun All-Conference First Team in 2013–14 and 2014–15.

After college, Comer signed with the Grand Rapids Drive of the NBA D-League but was cut after training camp. He declined international offers and retired from playing basketball in 2016.

== Coaching career ==
Comer joined Anthony Grant's staff at Dayton in 2017 as a graduate assistant after serving as a volunteer assistant at Indiana University of Pennsylvania. He was promoted to Director of Player Development in 2019. On July 16, 2022, he was hired as an assistant coach at Stetson. On March 20, 2025, he was hired as an assistant coach at Jacksonville.
