= 2022–23 Bellarmine Knights men's basketball team =

American college basketball season

2022–23 Bellarmine Knights men's basketball
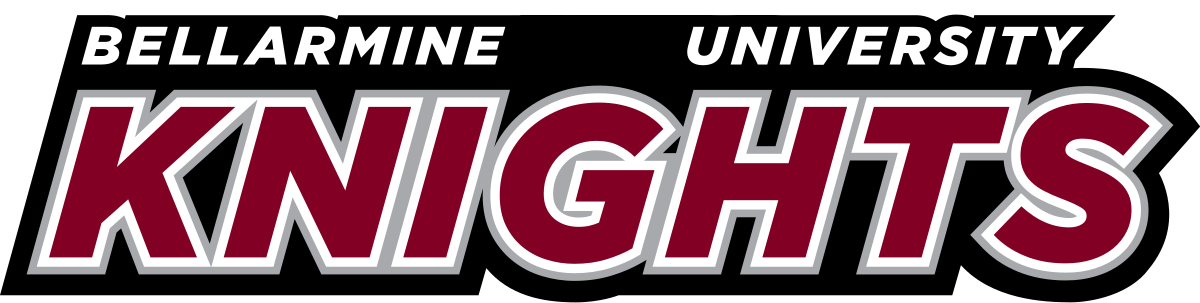
- Conference: ASUN Conference
- Record: 15–18 (9–9 ASUN)
- Head coach: Scott Davenport (18th season)
- Assistant coaches: Doug Davenport; Beau Braden; Al Davis
- Home arena: Freedom Hall

2022–23 ASUN men's basketball standings
	Conf.				Overall
Team	W		L	PCT	W		L	PCT
Kennesaw State †	15	–	3	.833	26	–	9	.743
Liberty	15	–	3	.833	27	–	9	.750
Eastern Kentucky	12	–	6	.667	23	–	14	.622
Stetson	12	–	6	.667	17	–	14	.548
Lipscomb	11	–	7	.611	20	–	13	.606
North Alabama	10	–	8	.556	18	–	15	.545
North Florida	9	–	9	.500	14	–	17	.452
Bellarmine*	9	–	9	.500	15	–	18	.455
Queens*	7	–	11	.389	18	–	15	.545
Florida Gulf Coast	7	–	11	.389	17	–	15	.531
Jacksonville	6	–	12	.333	13	–	16	.448
Jacksonville State	6	–	12	.333	13	–	18	.419
Central Arkansas	4	–	14	.222	9	–	22	.290
Austin Peay	3	–	15	.167	9	–	22	.290
† 2023 ASUN tournament winner * Ineligible for the 2023 NCAA tournament due to transition from Division II

The 2022–23 Bellarmine Knights men's basketball team represented Bellarmine University in the 2022–23 NCAA Division I men's basketball season. The Knights, led by 18th-year head coach Scott Davenport, played their home games at Freedom Hall in Louisville, Kentucky as members of the Atlantic Sun Conference (ASUN). The Knights finished the season 15–18, 9–9 ASUN play, to finish in a tie for seventh place. As the No. 8 seed in the ASUN tournament, they defeated North Florida in the first round before losing to Liberty in the quarterfinals.

The Knights were in the third year of a four-year transition from Division II to Division I meaning that they were ineligible for the NCAA tournament.

== Previous season ==
The Knights finished the 2021–22 season 20–13, 11–5 in ASUN play, to finish in second place in the West division. They defeated Florida Gulf Coast, Liberty and Jacksonville to win the ASUN tournament championship. Because the Knights were in the second year of a four-year transition period from Division II to Division I, they were not eligible for NCAA postseason play. As a result, the conference's automatic bid to the NCAA tournament went to regular-season champion Jacksonville State.

== Preseason ==
In the conference's preseason polls, the Knights were picked to finish fifth (media) and sixth (coaches) in the ASUN.

== Roster ==
2022–23 Bellarmine Knights men's basketball team
Players
Coaches

Pos.	#	Name	Height	Weight	Year	Previous school	Hometown
G	1	Juston Betz	6 ft 3 in (1.91 m)	185 lb (84 kg)	GS	Providence	New Albany, IN
G	2	Alec Pfriem	6 ft 5 in (1.96 m)	205 lb (93 kg)	Sr	Moeller High School	Cincinnati, OH
G	4	Landin Hacker	6 ft 0 in (1.83 m)	180 lb (82 kg)	RS Fr	Center Grove High School	Greenwood, IN
G	5	Peter Suder	6 ft 5 in (1.96 m)	210 lb (95 kg)	Fr	Carmel High School	Carmel, IN
G	10	Garrett Tipton	6 ft 4 in (1.93 m)	200 lb (91 kg)	RS Sr	Bishop Hartley High School	Columbus, OH
G	11	Michael Bova	6 ft 2 in (1.88 m)	190 lb (86 kg)	Fr	St. Edward High School	Lakewood, OH
F	12	Langdon Hatton	6 ft 10 in (2.08 m)	240 lb (109 kg)	So	William & Mary	Georgetown, IN
F	14	Sam DeVault	6 ft 10 in (2.08 m)	220 lb (100 kg)	Sr	Austin Peay	Evansville, IN
G	22	Bash Wieland	6 ft 6 in (1.98 m)	205 lb (93 kg)	Sr	Lakota East High School	Cincinnati, OH
G	23	Zach Reed	6 ft 2 in (1.88 m)	180 lb (82 kg)	Fr	Brebeuf Jesuit Prep	Indianapolis, IN
F	24	Eli Roberts	6 ft 7 in (2.01 m)	220 lb (100 kg)	Jr	Manual High School	Louisville, KY
F	30	Nick Thelen	6 ft 7 in (2.01 m)	210 lb (95 kg)	Sr	Covington Catholic High School	Edgewood, KY
G	33	Ben Johnson	6 ft 3 in (1.91 m)	185 lb (84 kg)	RS Fr	Lexington Catholic High School	Lexington, KY
G	34	Drew Comer	6 ft 4 in (1.93 m)	190 lb (86 kg)	RS Jr	Greensburg High School	Greensburg, IN
F	42	Curt Hopf	6 ft 8 in (2.03 m)	200 lb (91 kg)	So	Barr-Reeve High School	Montgomery, IN
G	55	Zac Jennings	6 ft 5 in (1.96 m)	205 lb (93 kg)	Jr	Cooper High School	Burlington, KY

Head coach

- Scott Davenport (Louisville)

Assistant coach(es)

- Doug Davenport (Bellarmine)
- Beau Braden (Centre)
- Al Davis (Bellarmine)

Legend

- (C) Team captain
- (S) Suspended
- (I) Ineligible
- (W) Walk-on
- Injured
- Current redshirt

Roster

== Schedule and results ==
In a story on the NCAA's official website, Knights head coach Scott Davenport commented on the team's late-November schedule:

Perhaps you're not aware of this ... Only four schools in the history of college basketball have played in Cameron Indoor Stadium, Pauley Pavilion and Rupp Arena. It's North Carolina, Notre Dame, St. John's and Louisville. Only four. The closest anyone ever did it was over two seasons, 333 days, from December to the following November. We are going to do that in nine days.

Date time, TV	Rank^{#}	Opponent^{#}	Result	Record	Site (attendance) city, state
Exhibition
October 27, 2022*; 11:00 a.m.		Centre	W 71–34		Freedom Hall (6,600); Louisville, KY
Non-conference regular season
November 9, 2022*; 9:00 p.m., ACCN		at Louisville	W 67–66	1–0	KFC Yum! Center (14,865); Louisville, KY
November 12, 2022*; 8:00 p.m., ESPN+		at Morehead State	L 55–62	1–1	Ellis Johnson Arena (2,166); Morehead, KY
November 14, 2022*; 6:00 p.m., ESPN+		Campbellsville-Harrodsburg	W 86–46	2–1	Knights Hall (1,696); Louisville, KY
November 18, 2022*; 7:00 p.m., ESPN+		at Clemson	L 66–76	2–2	Littlejohn Coliseum (6,137); Clemson, SC
November 21, 2022*; 8:30 p.m., ACCN		at No. 8 Duke	L 57–74	2–3	Cameron Indoor Stadium (9,314); Durham, NC
November 25, 2022*; 3:00 p.m., WCC Network		at Loyola Marymount	L 59–80	2–4	Gersten Pavilion (634); Los Angeles, CA
November 27, 2022*; 7:00 p.m., P12N		at No. 19 UCLA	L 60–81	2–5	Pauley Pavilion (6,001); Los Angeles, CA
November 29, 2022*; 7:00 p.m., SECN+		at No. 19 Kentucky	L 41–60	2–6	Rupp Arena (19,092); Lexington, KY
December 4, 2022*; 4:00 p.m., ESPN+		Alice Lloyd	W 110–38	3–6	Freedom Hall (1,273); Louisville, KY
December 6, 2022*; 6:30 p.m., ESPN+		Wabash	W 86–45	4–6	Freedom Hall (1,262); Louisville, KY
December 10, 2022*; 4:00 p.m., ESPN+		Murray State	W 69–58	5–6	Freedom Hall (2,853); Louisville, KY
December 17, 2022*; 4:00 p.m., ESPN+		Miami (OH)	L 67–71	5–7	Freedom Hall (2,692); Louisville, KY
December 21, 2022*; 8:00 p.m., ESPN+		at Evansville	L 61–73	5–8	Ford Center (4,603); Evansville, IN
ASUN regular season
December 29, 2022; 6:30 p.m., ESPN+		Liberty	L 53–70	5–9 (0–1)	Freedom Hall (2,805); Louisville, KY
January 2, 2023; 7:00 p.m., ESPN+		at North Alabama	W 69–65	6–9 (1–1)	Flowers Hall (612); Florence, AL
January 5, 2023; 6:30 p.m., ESPN+		Queens	L 74–75	6–10 (1–2)	Freedom Hall (1,743); Louisville, KY
January 7, 2023; 9:00 p.m., ESPN+		at Jacksonville State	W 75–62	7–10 (2–2)	Pete Mathews Coliseum (2,165); Jacksonville, AL
January 12, 2023; 6:30 p.m., ESPN+		Stetson	L 51–80	7–11 (2–3)	Freedom Hall (1,942); Louisville, KY
January 14, 2023; 4:00 p.m., ESPN+		Florida Gulf Coast	W 61–41	8–11 (3–3)	Freedom Hall (3,299); Louisville, KY
January 19, 2023; 8:00 p.m., ESPN+		at Austin Peay	W 56–45	9–11 (4–3)	Dunn Center (1,523); Clarksville, TN
January 21, 2023; 5:00 p.m., ESPN+		at Lipscomb	L 49–69	9–12 (4–4)	Allen Arena (1,939); Nashville, TN
January 26, 2023; 6:30 p.m., ESPN+		Eastern Kentucky	W 72–71	10–12 (5–4)	Freedom Hall (3,842); Louisville, KY
January 28, 2023; 7:00 p.m., ESPN+		at Eastern Kentucky	L 63–73	10–13 (5–5)	Baptist Health Arena (4,025); Richmond, KY
February 2, 2023; 7:30 p.m., ESPN+		Kennesaw State	L 84–90 ^{2OT}	10–14 (5–6)	Freedom Hall (1,649); Louisville, KY
February 4, 2023; 4:00 p.m., ESPN+		Jacksonville State	W 71–64	11–14 (6–6)	Freedom Hall (2,738); Louisville, KY
February 9, 2023; 7:00 p.m., ESPN+		at Liberty	L 50–70	11–15 (6–7)	Liberty Arena (3,149); Lynchburg, VA
February 11, 2023; 1:00 p.m., ESPN+		at Queens	W 88–84	12–15 (7–7)	Curry Arena (607); Charlotte, NC
February 16, 2023; 7:30 p.m., ESPN+		North Alabama	L 57–70	12–16 (7–8)	Freedom Hall (1,648); Louisville, KY
February 19, 2023; 4:00 p.m., ESPN+		Central Arkansas	W 68–67	13–16 (8–8)	Freedom Hall (3,056); Louisville, KY
February 22, 2023; 5:00 p.m., ESPNU		Jacksonville	W 63–61	14–16 (9–8)	Swisher Gymnasium (1,073); Jacksonville, FL
February 24, 2023; 7:00 p.m.		at North Florida	L 67–79	14–17 (9–9)	UNF Arena (1,889); Jacksonville, FL
ASUN tournament
February 27, 2023; 7:00 p.m., ESPN+	(8)	vs. (7) North Florida; First round	W 76–74	15–17	Liberty Arena (135); Lynchburg, VA
February 28, 2023; 7:00 p.m., ESPN+	(8)	at (2) Liberty; Quarterfinals	L 56–76	15–18	Liberty Arena (3,407); Lynchburg, VA
*Non-conference game. ^{#}Rankings from AP poll. (#) Tournament seedings in parentheses. All times are in Eastern.
