= Michael Lockley =

American football player (born 1988)

No. 59, 49
- Position: Linebacker

Personal information
- Born: April 20, 1988 (age 38); Orlando, Florida, U.S.
- Listed height: 6 ft 1 in (1.85 m)
- Listed weight: 237 lb (108 kg)

Career information
- High school: Olympia (Orlando)
- College: Florida Atlantic
- NFL draft: 2011: undrafted

Career history
- Jacksonville Jaguars (2011); Montreal Alouettes (2012)

Awards and highlights
- Second-team All-Sun Belt (2010)

Career NFL statistics
- Games played: 7
- Stats at Pro Football Reference

Career CFL statistics
- Tackles: 24
- Sacks: 3
- Stats at CFL.ca (archived)

Michael Lockley (born April 20, 1988) is an American former professional football player who was a linebacker in the National Football League (NFL) and Canadian Football League (CFL). He played college football for the Florida Atlantic Owls. He played for the Jacksonville Jaguars and Montreal Alouettes.

== Early life ==
Lockley lettered in football, weightlifting and track and field at Olympia High School in Orlando, Florida. He recorded 110 tackles and seven blocked kicks in his high school career. He earned All-Orange County and All-District honors his senior year. He was also named Olympia's Athlete of the Year. Lockley played in the East-West Metro Senior All-Star Game.

== College career ==
Lockley was a four-year football letterman for the Florida Atlantic Owls. He finished his college career with 234 total tackles, 13.5 tackles for loss, two sacks and three forced fumbles. He also blocked four field goal attempts. Lockley was an All-Sun Belt second-team selection his senior year.

== Professional career ==
Lockley was rated the 25th best inside linebacker in the 2011 NFL draft by NFLDraftScout.com. He was signed by the Jacksonville Jaguars on July 26, 2011. He was fined $20,000 for a hit on New England Patriots wide receiver Taylor Price in the first preseason game of 2011. He was released by the Jaguars on September 3, 2011 and signed to the Jaguars' practice squad on September 4, 2011. Lockley was promoted to the active roster on November 8, 2011. He made his NFL debut on special teams on November 13, 2011 against the Indianapolis Colts. Lockley was released by the Jaguars on December 27, 2011. He played in seven games for the Jaguars.

Lockley signed with the Montreal Alouettes on June 8, 2012. He recorded 24 total tackles and 3 sacks during the 2012 season. He was released by the Alouettes on June 21, 2013.
