= 2022–23 Florida Gulf Coast Eagles men's basketball team =

American college basketball season

2022–23 Florida Gulf Coast Eagles men's basketball
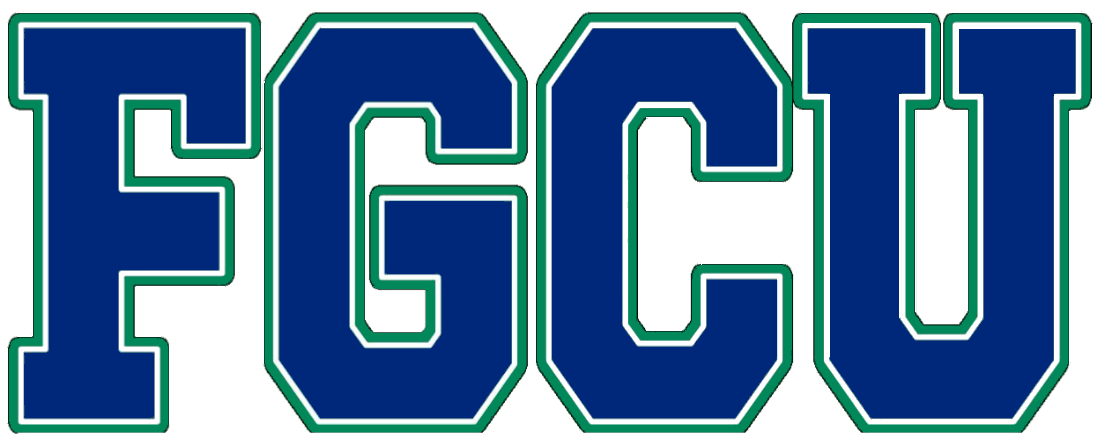

Gulf Coast Showcase champions
- Conference: ASUN Conference
- Record: 17–15 (7–11 ASUN)
- Head coach: Pat Chambers (1st season)
- Assistant coaches: KJ Baptiste (1st season); Kyle Griffin (1st season); Matt Griffin (1st season)
- Home arena: Alico Arena

2022–23 ASUN men's basketball standings
	Conf.				Overall
Team	W		L	PCT	W		L	PCT
Kennesaw State †	15	–	3	.833	26	–	9	.743
Liberty	15	–	3	.833	27	–	9	.750
Eastern Kentucky	12	–	6	.667	23	–	14	.622
Stetson	12	–	6	.667	17	–	14	.548
Lipscomb	11	–	7	.611	20	–	13	.606
North Alabama	10	–	8	.556	18	–	15	.545
North Florida	9	–	9	.500	14	–	17	.452
Bellarmine*	9	–	9	.500	15	–	18	.455
Queens*	7	–	11	.389	18	–	15	.545
Florida Gulf Coast	7	–	11	.389	17	–	15	.531
Jacksonville	6	–	12	.333	13	–	16	.448
Jacksonville State	6	–	12	.333	13	–	18	.419
Central Arkansas	4	–	14	.222	9	–	22	.290
Austin Peay	3	–	15	.167	9	–	22	.290
† 2023 ASUN tournament winner * Ineligible for the 2023 NCAA tournament due to transition from Division II

The 2022–23 Florida Gulf Coast Eagles men's basketball team represented Florida Gulf Coast University in the 2022–23 NCAA Division I men's basketball season. The Eagles, led by first-year head coach Pat Chambers, played their home games at Alico Arena in Fort Myers, Florida as members of the Atlantic Sun Conference (ASUN). They finished the season 17–15, 7–11 in ASUN play, to finish in a tie for ninth place. As the No. 10 seed in the ASUN tournament, they lost to Queens in the first round.

== Previous season ==
The Eagles finished the 2021–22 season 21–11; 10–6 to finish in third place in the East division in ASUN play. They defeated North Alabama in the first round of the ASUN tournament before losing to Bellarmine in the quarterfinals. They received an invite to The Basketball Classic, formerly known as the CollegeInsider.com Tournament. They defeated Detroit Mercy in the first round of the tournament before losing to Coastal Carolina in the second round.

On March 5, 2022, the school fired Michael Fly as head coach, after failing to lead the Eagles to previous post-season success. On March 14, the school named former Penn State head coach Pat Chambers the team's new head coach.

== Preseason ==
In the conference's preseason poll, the Eagles were picked to finish in fourth place.

== Roster ==
2022–23 Florida Gulf Coast Eagles men's basketball team
Players
Coaches

Pos.	#	Name	Height	Weight	Year	Previous school	Hometown
F	0	Dakota Rivers	6 ft 8 in (2.03 m)	208 lb (94 kg)	Sr	Windermere High School	Windermere, FL
G	1	Dahmir Bishop	6 ft 5 in (1.96 m)	190 lb (86 kg)	Sr	Saint Joseph's	Philadelphia, PA
G	2	Caleb Catto	6 ft 5 in (1.96 m)	182 lb (83 kg)	GS	Southwest Florida Christian Academy	Cape Coral, FL
C	3/24	Andre Weir	6 ft 10 in (2.08 m)	265 lb (120 kg)	RS So	Richmond	Hollywood, FL
G	4	Cyrus Largie	6 ft 3 in (1.91 m)	204 lb (93 kg)	Sr	Mater Lakes Academy	Miramar, FL
G	5	Chase Johnston	6 ft 3 in (1.91 m)	185 lb (84 kg)	Jr	Stetson	Boca Raton, FL
F	10	Zach Anderson	6 ft 7 in (2.01 m)	205 lb (93 kg)	Jr	Apopka High School	Apopka, FL
G	11	Isaiah Thompson	6 ft 1 in (1.85 m)	160 lb (73 kg)	Sr	Purdue	Zionsville, IN
G	12	Franco Miller Jr.	6 ft 3 in (1.91 m)	201 lb (91 kg)	RS Sr	Ole Miss	Freeport, Bahamas
F	15	Blaise Vespe	6 ft 7 in (2.01 m)	220 lb (100 kg)	Fr	IMG Academy	Franklinville, NJ
F	20	Chance Jackson	6 ft 6 in (1.98 m)	202 lb (92 kg)	Sr	Plant High School	Tampa, FL
C	23	Sam Onu	6 ft 11 in (2.11 m)	270 lb (122 kg)	RS Fr	Memphis	Malvern, PA
F	24	Josiah Shackleford	6 ft 9 in (2.06 m)	225 lb (102 kg)	So	Brunswick Community College	Greenville, NC
G	31	Brandon Dwyer	6 ft 3 in (1.91 m)	180 lb (82 kg)	So	La Salle	Newark, DE
G	32	Austin Richie	6 ft 6 in (1.98 m)	226 lb (103 kg)	Sr	Tulsa	Glenwood, IL
F	44	Kyle Riemenschneider	6 ft 5 in (1.96 m)	205 lb (93 kg)	Jr	Fort Myers High School	Fort Myers, FL
G	51	Lenny Ricca	6 ft 2 in (1.88 m)	170 lb (77 kg)	Sr	St. Thomas Aquinas High School	Weston, FL

Head coach

- Pat Chambers (Philadelphia)

Assistant coach(es)

- KJ Baptiste (Brandeis)
- Kyle Griffin (Siena)
- Matt Griffin (Boston University)

Legend

- (C) Team captain
- (S) Suspended
- (I) Ineligible
- (W) Walk-on
- Injured
- Current redshirt

Roster
Last update: January 17, 2023

== Schedule and results ==
Date time, TV	Rank^{#}	Opponent^{#}	Result	Record	Site (attendance) city, state
Non-conference regular season
November 7, 2022*; 9:30 pm, P12N		at USC	W 74–61	1–0	Galen Center (2,355); Los Angeles, CA
November 9, 2022*; 10:00 pm, WCC Network		at San Diego	L 73–79	1–1	Jenny Craig Pavilion (956); San Diego, CA
November 13, 2022*; 6:00 pm, ESPN+		Ave Maria	W 105–61	2–1	Alico Arena (3,081); Fort Myers, FL
November 16, 2022*; 7:00 pm, ESPN+		at No. 17 Tennessee	L 50–81	2–2	Thompson–Boling Arena (16,524); Knoxville, TN
November 21, 2022*; 7:30 pm, FloHoops		vs. Northern Kentucky; Gulf Coast Showcase quarterfinals	W 82–61	3–2	Hertz Arena (1,023); Estero, FL
November 22, 2022*; 7:30 pm, FloHoops		vs. Drexel; Gulf Coast Showcase semifinals	W 67–59	4–2	Hertz Arena (952); Estero, FL
November 23, 2022*; 7:30 pm, FloHoops		vs. Kansas City; Gulf Coast Showcase championship	W 73–59	5–2	Hertz Arena (1,010); Estero, FL
November 30, 2022*; 7:30 pm, ESPN+		at Georgia Southern	W 70–53	6–2	Hanner Fieldhouse (1,423); Statesboro, GA
December 4, 2022*; 6:00 pm, ESPN+		FIU	W 74–65	7–2	Alico Arena (2,033); Fort Myers, FL
December 7, 2022*; 7:00 pm, ESPN+		at Florida Atlantic	L 53–85	7–3	Eleanor R. Baldwin Arena (2,281); Boca Raton, FL
December 10, 2022*; 7:00 pm, ESPN+		Mercer	W 67–62	8–3	Alico Arena (2,103); Fort Myers, FL
December 16, 2022*; 7:00 pm, ESPN+		at St. Bonaventure	W 71–58	9–3	Reilly Center (3,005); St. Bonaventure, NY
December 21, 2022*; 7:00 pm, ESPN+		Canisius	W 84–81	10–3	Alico Arena (2,172); Fort Myers, FL
ASUN regular season
December 31, 2022; 1:00 pm, ESPN+		Jacksonville	W 72–65	11–3 (1–0)	Alico Arena (2,034); Fort Myers, FL
January 2, 2023; 8:30 pm, ESPN+		at Central Arkansas	W 84–79 ^{OT}	12–3 (2–0)	Farris Center (367); Conway, AR
January 5, 2023; 8:00 pm, ESPN+		at Austin Peay	L 59–61	12–4 (2–1)	Dunn Center (1,061); Clarksville, TN
January 7, 2023; 7:00 pm, ESPN+		North Florida	W 82–57	13–4 (3–1)	Alico Arena (2,375); Fort Myers, FL
January 12, 2023; 7:00 pm, ESPN+		at Eastern Kentucky	L 76–97	13–5 (3–2)	Baptist Health Arena (3,389); Richmond, KY
January 14, 2023; 4:00 pm, ESPN+		at Bellarmine	L 41–61	13–6 (3–3)	Freedom Hall (3,299); Louisville, KY
January 19, 2023; 7:00 pm, ESPN+		Jacksonville State	W 55–51	14–6 (4–3)	Alico Arena (2,471); Fort Myers, FL
January 21, 2023; 7:00 pm, ESPN+		Kennesaw State	L 63–65	14–7 (4–4)	Alico Arena (2,171); Fort Myers, FL
January 26, 2023; 7:00 pm, ESPN+		at Queens	L 82–84	14–8 (4–5)	Curry Arena (403); Charlotte, NC
January 28, 2023; 7:00 pm, ESPN+		at Liberty	L 57–74	14–9 (4–6)	Liberty Arena (4,007); Lynchburg, VA
February 2, 2023; 7:00 pm, ESPN+		Central Arkansas	L 87–91	14–10 (4–7)	Alico Arena (1,813); Fort Myers, FL
February 4, 2023; 7:00 pm, ESPN+		North Alabama	L 85–87 ^{OT}	14–11 (4–8)	Alico Arena (4,056); Fort Myers, FL
February 9, 2023; 7:00 pm, ESPN+		at North Florida	W 68–66	15–11 (5–8)	UNF Arena (1,589); Jacksonville, FL
February 11, 2023; 4:00 pm, ESPN+		at Jacksonville	W 62–51	16–11 (6–8)	Swisher Gymnasium (1,087); Jacksonville, FL
February 15, 2023; 7:00 pm, ESPN+		at Stetson	L 72–75	16–12 (6–9)	Edmunds Center (903); DeLand, FL
February 18, 2023; 6:00 pm, ESPN+		Stetson	L 84–88	16–13 (6–10)	Alico Arena (2,139); Fort Myers, FL
February 22, 2023; 7:00 pm, ESPN+		Lipscomb	L 64–73	16–14 (6–11)	Alico Arena (2,034); Fort Myers, FL
February 24, 2023; 7:00 pm, ESPN+		Austin Peay	W 89–71	17–14 (7–11)	Alico Arena (2,291); Fort Myers, FL
ASUN tournament
February 27, 2023; 7:00 pm, ESPN+	(10)	vs. (9) Queens; First round	L 55–61	17–15	KSU Convocation Center (123); Kennesaw, GA
*Non-conference game. ^{#}Rankings from AP poll. (#) Tournament seedings in parentheses. All times are in Eastern Time.
