= Rashad Lawrence =

American football player (born 1992)

No. 85
- Position: Wide receiver

Personal information
- Born: June 10, 1992 (age 34); Orlando, Florida
- Listed height: 6 ft 2 in (1.88 m)
- Listed weight: 190 lb (86 kg)

Career information
- High school: Orlando (FL) Olympia
- College: Northwestern
- NFL draft: 2014: undrafted

Career history
- Washington Redskins (2014)*; Chicago Bears (2014–2015)*; Jacksonville Jaguars (2015–2016); New Orleans Saints (2017)*; Miami Dolphins (2017)*; Hamilton Tiger-Cats (2018)
- * Offseason or practice squad member only
- Stats at Pro Football Reference
- Stats at CFL.ca

Rashad Lawrence (born June 10, 1992) is an American football wide receiver. He played college football at Northwestern.

== College career ==
Lawrence played for the Northwestern Wildcats where he excelled in his junior year where he was the second player on the team with 34 receptions. In his senior year, he had a game against Wisconsin with eight career-high receptions.

== Professional career ==
=== Washington Redskins ===
Lawrence signed with the Washington Redskins as an undrafted free agent on May 15, 2014. He was waived by the Redskins on August 26, 2014.

=== Chicago Bears ===
On November 11, 2014, Lawrence was signed to the Chicago Bears practice squad. He signed a reserve/future contract with the Bears on December 29, 2014.

On September 5, 2015, Lawrence was waived by the Bears.

=== Jacksonville Jaguars ===
On September 8, 2015, Lawrence was signed to the Jacksonville Jaguars practice squad. He was promoted to the active roster on December 5, 2015. He was released on December 15, 2015, and re-signed to the practice squad. He signed a reserve/future contract on January 5, 2016.

On September 3, 2016, he was waived by the Jaguars and signed to the practice squad the next day. He was released by the Jaguars on November 10, 2016.

=== New Orleans Saints ===
On January 17, 2017, Lawrence signed a reserve/future contract with the New Orleans Saints. He was waived on August 12, 2017.

=== Miami Dolphins ===
On August 15, 2017, Lawrence was signed by the Miami Dolphins. He was waived on September 2, 2017.

=== Hamilton Tiger-Cats ===
Played 10 games in 2018 for Tiger-Cats in CFL. Handled Wide Receiver and Kick Return duties. Had 17 catches out of 27 attempts for 131 yards. Longest for 19 yards and 7.7 yard average. Returned 6 kickoffs for 101 yards and 16.8 yard average. Longest for 26 yards.

== Football Coaching Career ==
Former Wide Receiver coach for Allen D. Nease High School Football Team in Ponte Vedra, Florida (2019–2020).

== Personal ==
Lawrence is the founder and lead trainer of Solid Ground Athletics, a sports performance group that develops athletes in North and Central Florida. He mentors and trains a diverse group of athletes ranging from elementary school to the NFL.
