= 2026–27 Florida Gulf Coast Eagles men's basketball team =

American college basketball season

2026–27 Florida Gulf Coast Eagles men's basketball
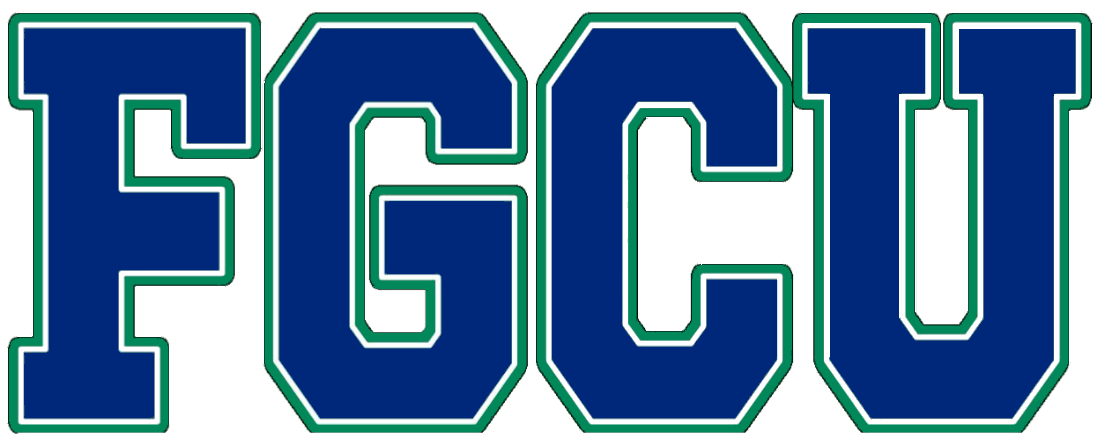
- Conference: Atlantic Sun Conference
- Record: 2–4 (0–0 ASUN)
- Head coach: Pat Chambers (5th season)
- Associate head coach: DJ Irving
- Assistant coaches: David Caporaletti; Dominic Morris; Darrin Wallace; Ryan Chlebek; Will Chlebek
- Home arena: Alico Arena

2026–27 ASUN men's basketball standings
| | Conf. | | | | Overall |
| Team | W | | L | PCT | W | | L | PCT |
|---|---|---|---|---|---|---|---|---|
| Queens | 0 | – | 0 | – | 3 | – | 2 | .600 |
| Lipscomb | 0 | – | 0 | – | 3 | – | 3 | .500 |
| West Florida* | 0 | – | 0 | – | 3 | – | 3 | .500 |
| Jacksonville | 0 | – | 0 | – | 2 | – | 2 | .500 |
| North Florida | 0 | – | 0 | – | 2 | – | 3 | .400 |
| Florida Gulf Coast | 0 | – | 0 | – | 2 | – | 4 | .333 |
| Stetson | 0 | – | 0 | – | 1 | – | 4 | .200 |
| Bellarmine | 0 | – | 0 | – | 1 | – | 5 | .167 |
† 2027 ASUN tournament winner * ineligible for the 2027 NCAA tournament due to transition from Division II; As of November 19, 2026; Rankings from AP poll

The 2026–27 Florida Gulf Coast Eagles men's basketball team represents Florida Gulf Coast University during the 2026–27 NCAA Division I men's basketball season. The Eagles, led by fifth-year head coach Pat Chambers, play their home games at Alico Arena in Fort Myers, Florida as members of the Atlantic Sun Conference.

== Previous season ==
The Eagles finished the 2025–26 season 16–18, 8–10 in ASUN play to finish in a tie for fifth place. As the No. 5 seed in the ASUN tournament, they defeated North Alabama and Lipscomb before losing to Central Arkansas in the semifinals.

== Roster ==
2026–27 Florida Gulf Coast Eagles men's basketball team
Players
Coaches

| Pos. | # | Name | Height | Weight | Year | Previous school | Hometown |
|---|---|---|---|---|---|---|---|
| F | 0 | Trace Westercamp | 6 ft 9 in (2.06 m) | 213 lb (97 kg) | Fr | The Rock School | Jacksonville, FL |
| G | 1 | Turk Brown III | 6 ft 0 in (1.83 m) | 179 lb (81 kg) | Fr | Paul VI Catholic High School | Baltimore, MD |
| G | 2 | Darren Williams | 6 ft 4 in (1.93 m) | 183 lb (83 kg) | Jr | Archbishop Ryan High School | Philadelphia, PA |
| F | 3 | Gabe Tanner | 6 ft 4 in (1.93 m) | 193 lb (88 kg) | So | Perkiomen School | Scranton, PA |
| G | 4 | Matt McCarthy | 6 ft 3 in (1.91 m) | 193 lb (88 kg) | So | Episcopal Academy | Aston, PA |
| F | 5 | Bryson Lucas | 6 ft 7 in (2.01 m) | 204 lb (93 kg) | GS | PennWest California | Clarksburg, WV |
| G | 6 | Nikolas Sermpezis | 6 ft 6 in (1.98 m) | 197 lb (89 kg) | Fr | Bayern Munich | Munich, Germany |
| G | 8 | BB Washington | 6 ft 5 in (1.96 m) | 195 lb (88 kg) | Jr | Christian Academy of Louisville | Houston, TX |
| G | 10 | George Washington III | 6 ft 2 in (1.88 m) | 189 lb (86 kg) | Sr | Richmond | Louisville, KY |
| F | 12 | Evan Barlow | 6 ft 4 in (1.93 m) | 198 lb (90 kg) | Jr | Morton High School | Morton, IL |
| G | 13 | Elijah Brooks | 6 ft 3 in (1.91 m) | 201 lb (91 kg) | GS | Houston Christian | Topeka, KS |
| C | 21 | Tristen Guillouette | 6 ft 10 in (2.08 m) | 235 lb (107 kg) | Jr | George School | Willingboro, NJ |
| F | 22 | Kingston Wheatley | 6 ft 7 in (2.01 m) | 206 lb (93 kg) | Fr | West Catholic Preparatory High School | Sicklerville, NJ |
| F | 23 | Chase Konieczny | 6 ft 4 in (1.93 m) | 198 lb (90 kg) | So | St. Joseph High School | South Bend, IN |
| C | 44 | Justin Houser | 7 ft 0 in (2.13 m) | 230 lb (104 kg) | So | Penn State | Camp Hill, PA |
| F | 45 | CJ Outlaw | 6 ft 9 in (2.06 m) | 227 lb (103 kg) | Sr | UMass | Orlando, FL |

Head coach

- Pat Chambers (Philadelphia)

Assistant coach(es)

- DJ Irving (Boston University)
- David Caporaletti (Philadelphia)
- Dominic Morris (Boston University)
- Ryan Chlebek (Wooster)
- Will Chlebek (Florida Gulf Coast)

Legend

- (C) Team captain
- (S) Suspended
- (I) Ineligible
- (W) Walk-on
- Injured
- Current redshirt

Roster
Last update: November 9, 2026

== Schedule and results ==
| Date time, TV | Rank^{#} | Opponent^{#} | Result | Record | Site (attendance) city, state |
Non-conference regular season
| November 2, 2026*; 7:00 p.m., ESPN+ | | at UCF | L 95–96 ^{OT} | 0–1 | Addition Financial Arena (5,054); Orlando, FL |
| November 6, 2026*; 7:00 p.m., ESPN+ | | New College of Florida | W 89–67 | 1–1 | Alico Arena (1,204); Fort Myers, FL |
| November 9, 2026*; 7:00 p.m., SECN+ | | at Georgia | L 72–80 | 1–2 | Stegeman Coliseum (5,228); Athens, GA |
| November 13, 2026*; 7:00 p.m., ESPN+ | | FIU | L 80–89 | 1–3 | Alico Arena (2,263); Fort Myers, FL |
| November 15, 2026*; 12:00 p.m., ESPN+ | | Abraham Baldwin | W 99–31 | 2–3 | Alico Arena (1,056); Fort Myers, FL |
| November 18, 2026*; 7:00 p.m., ESPN+ | | at Florida Atlantic | L 76–86 | 2–4 | Eleanor R. Baldwin Arena (2,111); Boca Raton, FL |
| November 23, 2026*; 1:30 p.m. | | vs. Charlotte; Fort Myers Tip-Off | | | Suncoast Credit Union Arena; Fort Myers, FL |
| November 25, 2026*; 4:00 p.m. | | vs. Georgia State; Fort Myers Tip-Off | | | Suncoast Credit Union Arena; Fort Myers, FL |
| November 29, 2026*; 5:00 p.m., ESPN+ | | at LSU New Orleans | | | Lakefront Arena; New Orleans, LA |
| December 5, 2026*; 8:00 p.m., ESPN+ | | at Pepperdine | | | Firestone Fieldhouse; Malibu, CA |
| December 7, 2026*; 7:30 p.m., ESPN+ | | at Loyola Marymount | | | Gersten Pavilion; Los Angeles, CA |
| December 13, 2026*; 12:00 p.m., ESPN+ | | Alcorn State | | | Alico Arena; Fort Myers, FL |
| December 19, 2026*; 2:00 p.m., ESPN+ | | Tarleton State | | | Alico Arena; Fort Myers, FL |
| December 21, 2026*; 7:00 p.m., ESPN+ | | Abilene Christian | | | Alico Arena; Fort Myers, FL |
| December 28, 2026*; 2:00 p.m., ESPN+ | | Florida Tech | | | Alico Arena; Fort Myers, FL |
| December 31, 2026*; 2:00 p.m., ESPN+ | | at Central Arkansas | | | Farris Center; Conway, AK |
| January 2, 2027*; 2:00 p.m., ESPN+ | | at Little Rock | | | Jack Stephens Center; Little Rock, AR |
| January 5, 2027*; 7:00 p.m., ESPN+ | | UT Arlington | | | Alico Arena; Fort Myers, FL |
ASUN regular season
| January 9, 2027; 2:00 p.m., ESPN+ | | at Stetson | | | Insight Credit Union Arena; DeLand, FL |
| January 14, 2027; 8:00 p.m. | | at Bellarmine | | | Knights Hall; Louisville,KY |
| January 16, 2027; 5:00 p.m., ESPN+ | | at Lipscomb | | | Allen Arena; Nashville, TN |
| January 21, 2027; 7:00 p.m., ESPN+ | | West Florida | | | Alico Arena; Fort Myers, FL |
| January 23, 2027; 2:00 p.m., ESPN+ | | Queens | | | Alico Arena; Fort Myers, FL |
| January 28, 2027; TBD, ESPN+ | | at Jacksonville | | | Swisher Gymnasium; Jacksonville, FL |
| January 30, 2027; 5:00 p.m. | | at North Florida | | | UNF Arena; Jacksonville, FL |
| February 6, 2027; 1:00 p.m., ESPN+ | | Stetson | | | Alico Arena; Fort Myers, FL |
| February 11, 2027; 7:00 p.m., ESPN+ | | Lipscomb | | | Alico Arena; Fort Myers, FL |
| February 13, 2027; 2:00 p.m., ESPN+ | | Bellarmine | | | Alico Arena; Fort Myers, FL |
| February 18, 2027; 7:00 p.m. | | at Queens | | | Curry Arena; Charlotte, NC |
| February 20, 2027; 2:00 p.m., ESPN+ | | at West Florida | | | PenAir Field House; Pensacola, FL |
| February 25, 2027; 7:30 p.m., ESPN+ | | North Florida | | | Alico Arena; Fort Myers, FL |
| February 27, 2027; 4:00 p.m., ESPN+ | | Jacksonville | | | Alico Arena; Fort Myers, FL |
ASUN tournament
| TBD; TBD, TBD | (TBD) | (TBD) TBD; TBD | | | TBD (TBD); TBD |
*Non-conference game. ^{#}Rankings from AP Poll. (#) Tournament seedings in parentheses. All times are in Eastern.
