= 2022–23 North Alabama Lions men's basketball team =

American college basketball season

2022–23 North Alabama Lions men's basketball

CBI, first round
- Conference: ASUN Conference
- Record: 18–15 (10–8 ASUN)
- Head coach: Tony Pujol (5th season)
- Assistant coaches: Ahmad Smith; Willie Watson; Carter Heston
- Home arena: Flowers Hall

2022–23 ASUN men's basketball standings
	Conf.				Overall
Team	W		L	PCT	W		L	PCT
Kennesaw State †	15	–	3	.833	26	–	9	.743
Liberty	15	–	3	.833	27	–	9	.750
Eastern Kentucky	12	–	6	.667	23	–	14	.622
Stetson	12	–	6	.667	17	–	14	.548
Lipscomb	11	–	7	.611	20	–	13	.606
North Alabama	10	–	8	.556	18	–	15	.545
North Florida	9	–	9	.500	14	–	17	.452
Bellarmine*	9	–	9	.500	15	–	18	.455
Queens*	7	–	11	.389	18	–	15	.545
Florida Gulf Coast	7	–	11	.389	17	–	15	.531
Jacksonville	6	–	12	.333	13	–	16	.448
Jacksonville State	6	–	12	.333	13	–	18	.419
Central Arkansas	4	–	14	.222	9	–	22	.290
Austin Peay	3	–	15	.167	9	–	22	.290
† 2023 ASUN tournament winner * Ineligible for the 2023 NCAA tournament due to transition from Division II

The 2022–23 North Alabama Lions men's basketball team represented the University of North Alabama in the 2022–23 NCAA Division I men's basketball season. The Lions, led by fifth-year head coach Tony Pujol, played their home games at Flowers Hall in Florence, Alabama as members of the West division of the ASUN Conference.

They finished the season 18–15, 10–8 in ASUN play, to finish in sixth place. They lost to Eastern Kentucky in the first round of the ASUN tournament. The Lions received an invitation to play in the 2023 College Basketball Invitational (CBI), where they were defeated in the first round by Southern Utah.

== Previous season ==
The Lions finished the 2021–22 season 9–21, 2–14 in ASUN play, to finish in last place in the West division. They lost to Florida Gulf Coast in the first round of the ASUN tournament.

== Roster ==
2022–23 North Alabama Lions men's basketball team
Players
Coaches

Pos.	#	Name	Height	Weight	Year	Previous school	Hometown
G	0	Will Soucie	6 ft 6 in (1.98 m)	200 lb (91 kg)	So	Gill St. Bernard's School	Califon, NJ
G	1	Detalian Brown	6 ft 2 in (1.88 m)	190 lb (86 kg)	So	Combine Academy Prep	Chicago, IL
G	2	Daniel Ortiz	6 ft 0 in (1.83 m)	187 lb (85 kg)	So	Calvary Baptist Academy	Shreveport, LA
G	3	KJ Johnson	6 ft 3 in (1.91 m)	173 lb (78 kg)	Jr	Lipscomb	Lewisburg, TN
F	4	Bryson Dawkins	6 ft 3 in (1.91 m)	203 lb (92 kg)	Fr	Carroll High School	Dothan, AL
G	5	Jacari Lane	6 ft 0 in (1.83 m)	178 lb (81 kg)	Fr	Lee High School	Huntsville, AL
C	10	Sawyer Wright	6 ft 8 in (2.03 m)	228 lb (103 kg)	So	Deshler High School	Tuscumbia, AL
G	11	Aidan Kuhl	6 ft 3 in (1.91 m)	180 lb (82 kg)	Fr	Rocky Mountain High School	Fort Collins, CO
G	13	Blake Floyd	6 ft 0 in (1.83 m)	170 lb (77 kg)	Fr	Spain Park High School	Pelham, AL
F	21	Nikolas Gustavson	6 ft 5 in (1.96 m)	210 lb (95 kg)	So	Eastern Wyoming	Helsinki, Finland
C	22	Eoin Nelson	6 ft 11 in (2.11 m)	240 lb (109 kg)	Jr	Wyoming	Dublin, Ireland
F	23	Deraje Agbaosi	6 ft 7 in (2.01 m)	215 lb (98 kg)	So	PHH Prep	Union, NJ
F	25	Daniel Braster	6 ft 8 in (2.03 m)	210 lb (95 kg)	So	Lamar State College	Old Westbury, NY
F	33	Damian Forrest	6 ft 7 in (2.01 m)	215 lb (98 kg)	So	Cleveland State CC	Fort Collins, CO
F	34	Dallas Howell	6 ft 7 in (2.01 m)	210 lb (95 kg)	So	Enterprise High School	Coffee Springs, AL

Head coach

- Tony Pujol (Sterling)

Assistant coach(es)

- Ahmad Smith (Appalachian State)
- Willie Watson (Alabama)
- Carter Heston (Alabama)

Legend

- (C) Team captain
- (S) Suspended
- (I) Ineligible
- (W) Walk-on
- Injured
- Current redshirt

Roster
Last update: January 19, 2023

== Schedule and results ==
Date time, TV	Rank^{#}	Opponent^{#}	Result	Record	Site (attendance) city, state
Non-conference regular season
November 7, 2022*; 6:00 p.m., ESPN+		Oakwood	W 108–51	1–0	Flowers Hall (739); Florence, AL
November 10, 2022*; 7:00 p.m., YouTube		at Alabama A&M	W 84–76	2–0	Elmore Gymnasium (1,405); Normal, AL
November 14, 2022*; 6:00 p.m., ESPN+		Blue Mountain	W 100–60	3–0	Flowers Hall (620); Florence, AL
November 18, 2022*; 7:00 p.m., YouTube		at Mississippi Valley State	L 68–76	3–1	Harrison HPER Complex (1,109); Itta Bena, MS
November 22, 2022*; 2:00 p.m.		vs. Hampton; Santa Barbara Beach Classic	W 75–74	4–1	The Thunderdome (53); Santa Barbara, CA
November 23, 2022*; 9:00 p.m., ESPN+		at UC Santa Barbara; Santa Barbara Beach Classic	L 71–89	4–2	The Thunderdome (1,327); Santa Barbara, CA
November 26, 2022*; 3:00 p.m., ESPN+		at Georgia Tech	L 61–80	4–3	McCamish Pavilion (3,379); Atlanta, GA
November 30, 2022*; 2:00 p.m., ESPN+		at Memphis	L 68–87	4–4	FedExForum (9,473); Memphis, TN
December 3, 2022*; 1:00 p.m., ESPN+		at Morehead State	W 81–75	5–4	Ellis Johnson Arena (1,745); Morehead, KY
December 7, 2022*; 6:00 p.m., ESPN+		Alabama State	W 71–63	6–4	Flowers Hall (556); Florence, AL
December 15, 2022*; 7:30 p.m., P12N		at Colorado	L 60–84	6–5	CU Events Center (5,125); Boulder, CO
December 20, 2022*; 2:00 p.m., SECN+		at Ole Miss	W 66–65	7–5	SJB Pavilion (5,477); University, MS
December 21, 2022*; 3:00 p.m., ESPN+		Williams Baptist	W 83–45	8–5	Flowers Hall (433); Florence, AL
ASUN Conference regular season
December 30, 2022; 6:00 p.m., ESPN+		at Jacksonville State	W 66–62	9–5 (1–0)	Pete Mathews Coliseum (2,133); Jacksonville, AL
January 2, 2023; 6:00 p.m., ESPN+		Bellarmine	L 65–69	9–6 (1–1)	Flowers Hall (612); Florence, AL
January 5, 2023; 7:00 p.m., ESPN+		at Lipscomb	L 62–86	9–7 (1–2)	Allen Arena (1,190); Nashville, TN
January 7, 2023; 7:15 p.m., ESPN+		Stetson	L 85–95 ^{OT}	9–8 (1–3)	Flowers Hall (870); Florence, AL
January 12, 2023; 6:00 p.m., ESPN+		at Liberty	L 54–72	9–9 (1–4)	Liberty Arena (2,537); Lynchburg, VA
January 14, 2023; 12:00 p.m., ESPN+		at Queens	L 78–107	9–10 (1–5)	Curry Arena (272); Charlotte, NC
January 18, 2023; 7:00 p.m., ESPN+		at Central Arkansas	W 78–73	10–10 (2–5)	Farris Center (1,453); Conway, AR
January 21, 2022; 7:15 p.m., ESPN+		Central Arkansas	W 82–66	11–10 (3–5)	Flowers Hall (1,870); Florence, AL
January 26, 2023; 6:00 p.m., ESPN+		Jacksonville	W 80–62	12–10 (4–5)	Flowers Hall (1,743); Florence, AL
January 28, 2023; 5:00 p.m., ESPN+		North Florida	W 91–78	13–10 (5–5)	Flowers Hall (2,146); Florence, AL
February 2, 2023; 6:00 p.m., ESPN+		at Stetson	L 57–79	13–11 (5–6)	Edmunds Center (700); DeLand, FL
February 4, 2023; 6:00 p.m., ESPN+		at Florida Gulf Coast	W 87–85 ^{OT}	14–11 (6–6)	Alico Arena (4,056); Fort Myers, FL
February 9, 2023; 7:45 p.m., ESPN+		Austin Peay	W 70–57	15–11 (7–6)	Flowers Hall (2,142); Florence, AL
February 11, 2023; 7:15 p.m., ESPN+		Lipscomb	W 80–70	16–11 (8–6)	Flowers Hall (2,700); Florence, AL
February 16, 2023; 6:30 p.m., ESPN+		at Bellarmine	W 70–57	17–11 (9–6)	Freedom Hall (1,648); Louisville, KY
February 18, 2023; 6:00 p.m., ESPN+		at Eastern Kentucky	W 98–93 ^{OT}	18–11 (10–6)	Baptist Health Arena (4,467); Richmond, KY
February 22, 2023; 6:00 p.m., ESPN+		Kennesaw State	L 66–79	18–12 (10–7)	Flowers Hall (1,735); Florence, AL
February 24, 2023; 6:00 p.m., ESPN+		Jacksonville State	L 83–92	18–13 (10–8)	Flowers Hall (2,133); Florence, AL
ASUN tournament
February 28, 2023; 7:00 p.m., ESPN+	(6)	at (3) Eastern Kentucky; Quarterfinals	L 48–73	18–14	Baptist Health Arena (4,574); Richmond, KY
College Basketball Invitational
March 18, 2023; 1:30 p.m., FloHoops	(13)	vs. (4) Southern Utah; First round	L 50–72	18–15	Ocean Center; Daytona Beach, FL
*Non-conference game. ^{#}Rankings from AP poll. (#) Tournament seedings in parentheses. All times are in Central.
