= 2022–23 Liberty Flames basketball team =

American college basketball season

2022–23 Liberty Flames basketball

Atlantic Sun regular season co-champions

NIT, Second Round
- Conference: ASUN Conference
- Record: 27–9 (15–3 ASUN)
- Head coach: Ritchie McKay (8th, 10th overall season)
- Associate head coach: Rob Jones
- Assistant coaches: Derek Johnston; Joe Pierre III
- Home arena: Liberty Arena

2022–23 ASUN men's basketball standings
	Conf.				Overall
Team	W		L	PCT	W		L	PCT
Kennesaw State †	15	–	3	.833	26	–	9	.743
Liberty	15	–	3	.833	27	–	9	.750
Eastern Kentucky	12	–	6	.667	23	–	14	.622
Stetson	12	–	6	.667	17	–	14	.548
Lipscomb	11	–	7	.611	20	–	13	.606
North Alabama	10	–	8	.556	18	–	15	.545
North Florida	9	–	9	.500	14	–	17	.452
Bellarmine*	9	–	9	.500	15	–	18	.455
Queens*	7	–	11	.389	18	–	15	.545
Florida Gulf Coast	7	–	11	.389	17	–	15	.531
Jacksonville	6	–	12	.333	13	–	16	.448
Jacksonville State	6	–	12	.333	13	–	18	.419
Central Arkansas	4	–	14	.222	9	–	22	.290
Austin Peay	3	–	15	.167	9	–	22	.290
† 2023 ASUN tournament winner * Ineligible for the 2023 NCAA tournament due to transition from Division II

The 2022–23 Liberty Flames basketball team represented Liberty University in the 2022–23 NCAA Division I men's basketball season. The Flames were led by Ritchie McKay in the eighth season of his current stint as head coach (10th overall). They played their home games at Liberty Arena in Lynchburg, Virginia as members of the ASUN Conference.

They finished the season 24–7, 15–2 in 2022–23 ASUN Play to tie for first place in conference standings. They defeated Bellarmine and Eastern Kentucky before losing to Kennesaw State in the champion title match in the ASUN tournament. They received an at-large bid to the NIT tournament where they defeated Villanova in the first round before losing to Wisconsin in the second round.

== Previous season ==
The Flames finished the 2021–22 season 22–11, 12–4 in ASUN play to finish in first place in the East Division. They defeated Lipscomb in the quarterfinals of the ASUN tournament, before falling to Bellarmine in the semifinals.

== Roster ==
2022–23 Liberty Flames men's basketball team
Players
Coaches

Pos.	#	Name	Height	Weight	Year	Previous school	Hometown
G	0	Colin Porter	5 ft 9 in (1.75 m)	145 lb (66 kg)	Fr	Paul G. Blazer HS	Ashland, Kentucky
G	1	Brody Peebles	6 ft 2 in (1.88 m)	170 lb (77 kg)	So	Hartselle HS	Hartselle, Alabama
G	2	Darius McGhee	5 ft 9 in (1.75 m)	180 lb (82 kg)	RS Sr	Blue Ridge School	Roxboro, North Carolina
G	3	Isiah Warfield	6 ft 5 in (1.96 m)	180 lb (82 kg)	Jr	Central Valley HS	Monaca, Pennsylvania
G	4	Stephen Burggraf	6 ft 0 in (1.83 m)	160 lb (73 kg)	Sr	Liberty Christian Academy	Lynchburg, Virginia
F	5	Bryson Spell	6 ft 9 in (2.06 m)	220 lb (100 kg)	RS Fr	Cape Henry Collegiate School	Virginia Beach, Virginia
G	10	JC Shirer Jr.	6 ft 3 in (1.91 m)	195 lb (88 kg)	Fr	Grace Preparatory Academy	Arlington, Texas
G	11	Jonathan Jackson	6 ft 4 in (1.93 m)	180 lb (82 kg)	Jr	Blue Valley HS	Dallas, Texas
G	21	Gabriel McKay	6 ft 2 in (1.88 m)	190 lb (86 kg)	RS Jr	Trevecca Nazarene	Lynchburg, Virginia
F	22	Kyle Rode	6 ft 7 in (2.01 m)	220 lb (100 kg)	Sr	Lexington Christian Academy	Lexington, Kentucky
G	23	Joseph Venzant	6 ft 3 in (1.91 m)	195 lb (88 kg)	So	Midland Christian School	Midland, Texas
F	25	Zach Cleveland	6 ft 7 in (2.01 m)	210 lb (95 kg)	Fr	Normal Community HS	Bloomington, Illinois
F	32	Blake Preston	6 ft 9 in (2.06 m)	230 lb (104 kg)	RS Sr	Charlotte Christian School	Charlotte, North Carolina
F	33	Shiloh Robinson	6 ft 7 in (2.01 m)	210 lb (95 kg)	Sr	Kearney HS	Kearney, Nebraska
F	34	Ben Southerland	6 ft 7 in (2.01 m)	190 lb (86 kg)	Fr	Sycamore HS	Cincinnati, Ohio

Head coach

- Ritchie McKay (Seattle Pacific)

Assistant coach(es)

- Rob Jones (Toccoa Falls)
- Derek Johnston (Alabama–Huntsville)
- Joe Pierre III (Oklahoma State)

Legend

- (C) Team captain
- (S) Suspended
- (I) Ineligible
- (W) Walk-on
- Injured
- Current redshirt

Roster
Last update: November 26, 2022

== Schedule and results ==
Date time, TV	Rank^{#}	Opponent^{#}	Result	Record	Site (attendance) city, state
Non-conference regular season
November 7, 2022*; 7:00 pm, ESPN+		Regent	W 104–38	1–0	Liberty Arena (3,885); Lynchburg, VA
November 11, 2022*; 8:00 pm, SECN+/ESPN+		at No. 20 Alabama	L 59–95	1–1	Coleman Coliseum (10,270); Tuscaloosa, AL
November 14, 2022*; 7:00 pm, ESPN+		North Carolina Central	W 79–63	2–1	Liberty Arena (3,262); Lynchburg, VA
November 18, 2022*; 7:00 pm, ESPN+		Southern Miss; Cancún Challenge campus-site game	L 72–76	2–2	Liberty Arena (3,576); Lynchburg, VA
November 22, 2022*; 8:30 pm, CBSSN		vs. Northwestern; Cancún Challenge Riviera Division semifinals	L 52–66	2–3	Hard Rock Hotel Riviera Maya (321); Cancún, Mexico
November 23, 2022*; 6:00 pm, CBSSN		vs. Bradley; Cancún Challenge Riviera Division consolation	W 55–44	3–3	Hard Rock Hotel Riviera Maya (271); Cancún, Mexico
November 26, 2022*; 5:00 pm		Delaware State	W 80–53	4–3	Liberty Arena (3,081); Lynchburg, VA
December 2, 2022*; 7:00 pm, ESPN+		Maryland Eastern Shore	W 79–59	5–3	Liberty Arena (3,213); Lynchburg, VA
December 6, 2022*; 7:00 pm, ESPN+		Virginia University of Lynchburg	W 101–49	6–3	Liberty Arena (2,694); Lynchburg, VA
December 12, 2022*; 8:00 pm		at Oral Roberts	L 70–84	6–4	Mabee Center (4,422); Tulsa, OK
December 17, 2022*; 12:30 pm, ESPN+		vs. Bryant; Hall of Fame Classic	W 82–62	7–4	MassMutual Center; Springfield, MA
December 19, 2022*; 7:00 pm, ESPN+		Grambling State	W 75–56	8–4	Liberty Arena (2,379); Lynchburg, VA
December 21, 2022*; 12:00 pm, ESPN+		Mid-Atlantic Christian	W 88–50	9–4	Liberty Arena (2,326); Lynchburg, VA
ASUN Conference regular season
December 29, 2022; 6:30 pm, ESPN+		at Bellarmine	W 70–53	10–4 (1–0)	Freedom Hall (2,805); Louisville, KY
January 2, 2023; 7:00 pm, ESPN+		Lipscomb	W 77–48	11–4 (2–0)	Liberty Arena (2,437); Lynchburg, VA
January 5, 2023; 7:00 pm, ESPN+		Jacksonville State	W 75–41	12–4 (3–0)	Liberty Arena (2,280); Lynchburg, VA
January 8, 2023; 1:00 pm, ESPN+		at Eastern Kentucky	L 59–62	12–5 (3–1)	McBrayer Arena (3,216); Richmond, KY
January 12, 2023; 7:00 pm, ESPN+		North Alabama	W 72–54	13–5 (4–1)	Liberty Arena (2,537); Lynchburg, VA
January 14, 2023; 7:00 pm, ESPN+		Central Arkansas	W 82–62	14–5 (5–1)	Liberty Arena (3,648); Lynchburg, VA
January 19, 2023; 7:00 pm, ESPN+		at Jacksonville	W 66–52	15–5 (6–1)	Swisher Gymnasium (1,014); Jacksonville, FL
January 21, 2023; 2:00 pm, ESPN+		at North Florida	W 73–62	16–5 (7–1)	UNF Arena (1,559); Jacksonville, FL
January 26, 2023; 7:00 pm, ESPN+		Stetson	W 74–45	17–5 (8–1)	Liberty Arena (3,591); Lynchburg, VA
January 28, 2023; 7:00 pm, ESPN+		Florida Gulf Coast	W 74–57	18–5 (9–1)	Liberty Arena (4,007); Lynchburg, VA
February 2, 2023; 8:00 pm, ESPN+		at Austin Peay	W 82–70	19–5 (10–1)	Dunn Center (1,452); Clarksville, TN
February 4, 2023; 5:00 pm, ESPN+		at Lipscomb	L 64–69	19–6 (10–2)	Allen Arena (3,567); Nashville, TN
February 9, 2023; 7:00 pm, ESPN+		Bellarmine	W 70–50	20–6 (11–2)	Liberty Arena (3,149); Lynchburg, VA
February 11, 2023; 7:00 pm, ESPN+		Eastern Kentucky	W 83–73	21–6 (12–2)	Liberty Arena (3,961); Lynchburg, VA
February 16, 2023; 7:00 pm, ESPN+		at Kennesaw State	L 81–88	21–7 (12–3)	KSU Convocation Center (3,059); Kennesaw, GA
February 18, 2023; 5:00 pm, ESPN+		at Jacksonville State	W 79–55	22–7 (13–3)	Pete Mathews Coliseum (2,455); Jacksonville, AL
February 22, 2023; 7:00 pm, ESPN+		at Queens	W 85–77	23–7 (14–3)	Curry Arena (762); Charlotte, NC
February 24, 2023; 7:00 pm, ESPN+		Queens	W 73–53	24–7 (15–3)	Liberty Arena (4,041); Lynchburg, VA
ASUN tournament
February 28, 2023; 7:00 pm, ESPN+	(2)	(8) Bellarmine; Quarterfinals	W 76–56	25–7	Liberty Arena (3,407); Lynchburg, VA
March 2, 2023; 7:00 pm, ESPN+	(2)	(3) Eastern Kentucky; Semifinals	W 79–73	26–7	Liberty Arena (4,043); Lynchburg, VA
March 5, 2023; 3:00 pm, ESPN2	(2)	at (1) Kennesaw State; Championship	L 66–67	26–8	KSU Convocation Center (3,805); Kennesaw, GA
NIT
March 14, 2023*; 9:00 pm, ESPN2	(3)	Villanova; First Round – Oregon Bracket	W 62–57	27–8	Liberty Arena (3,252); Lynchburg, VA
March 19, 2023*; 12:00 pm, ESPN2/ESPN+	(3)	at (2) Wisconsin; Second Round – Oregon Bracket	L 71–75	27–9	Kohl Center (10,436); Madison, WI
*Non-conference game. ^{#}Rankings from AP Poll. (#) Tournament seedings in parentheses. All times are in Eastern.
