= Olympia High School (Orlando, Florida) =

Location
- 4301 South Apopka-Vineland Road; Orlando, Florida, 32835; United States; 28°29′50″N 81°30′30″W

Information
- Type: Public
- Motto: Where Our Core Business is Teaching and Learning
- Established: August 13, 2001; 25 years ago
- School district: Orange County Public Schools
- NCES School ID: 120144003746
- Principal: Thomas Ott
- Staff: 120.00 (on an FTE basis)
- Grades: 9–12
- Enrollment: 3,052 (Fall 2025–2026)
- Student to teacher ratio: 24.60
- Colors: Black, silver and teal
- Mascot: Titans
- Newspaper: The Oracle
- Website: olympiahs.ocps.net

Olympia High School is a public secondary school located in Orlando, Florida. OHS first opened on August 13, 2001, as a relief school for Dr. Phillips High School in unincorporated Orange County, Florida, United States, near Orlando.

Olympia serves the following in the MetroWest area: Gotha, Windermere, and sections of Lake Butler.

In 2026 the student body was 37% Hispanic, 27% Black, 25% White, and 6% Asian.

== Notable alumni ==
- Sherwood Brown, professional basketball player, member of Florida Gulf Coast team that reached the 2013 Sweet Sixteen
- Eric Cole, PGA Tour Rookie of the Year 2022-2023
- Deondre Francois, Fan Controlled Football (FCF) quarterback
- Nick Gordon, Minnesota Twins shortstop
- Chris Johnson, former NFL Running Back
- Rashad Lawrence, former NFL and CFL Wide Receiver
- Leah Lewis, actress
- Michael Lockley, former NFL and CFL Linebacker
- Brad Miller, Major League Baseball player Texas Rangers
- Joe Milton III, NFL quarterback for the Dallas Cowboys
- Marc-Eddy Norelia, professional basketball player for European Basketball League
- Trevor Siemian, NFL quarterback that most recently played with the New York Jets.
- Jesse Winker, Major League Baseball player New York Mets
- Michael Venus, professional tennis player
- Jizzle James, guard for the Cincinnati Bearcats men's basketball team.
