= Demetris Morant =

American basketball player (born 1992)

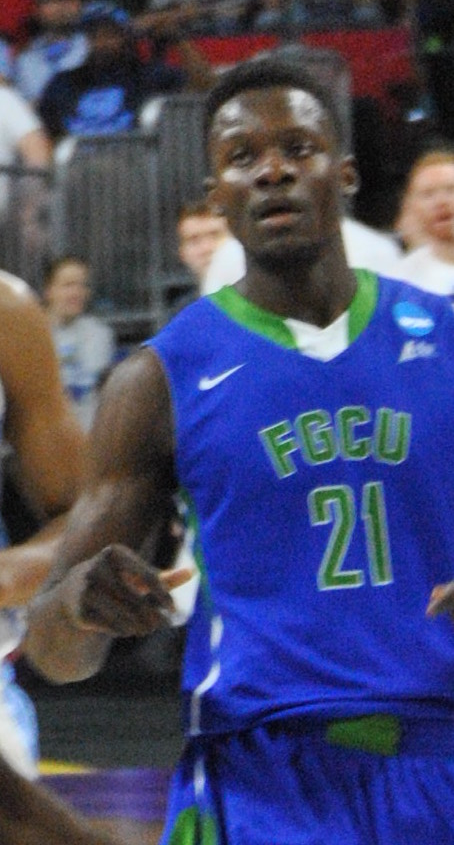
- Morant with the Florida Gulf Coast Eagles in 2016

No. 21 – Cockburn Cougars
- Position: Power forward / center
- League: NBL1 West

Personal information
- Born: August 20, 1992 (age 34) Miami, Florida, U.S.
- Listed height: 6 ft 9 in (2.06 m)
- Listed weight: 209 lb (95 kg)

Career information
- High school: Mountain View (Tucson, Arizona); Bishop Gorman (Las Vegas, Nevada)
- College: UNLV (2013–2014); Florida Gulf Coast (2014–2017)
- NBA draft: 2017: undrafted
- Playing career: 2017–present

Career history
- 2017: Aris Thessaloniki
- 2018–2019: Artland Dragons
- 2019: Szolnoki Olajbányász
- 2020: Adroit
- 2020–2021: KB Ylli
- 2021–2022: CSM Focșani
- 2022: SoCal Moguls
- 2022–2023: KB Ylli
- 2024–present: Cockburn Cougars

Career highlights
- Kosovo League champion (2021); Atlantic Sun Defensive Player of the Year (2017)

Demetris A. Morant (born August 20, 1992) is an American professional basketball player the Cockburn Cougars of the NBL1 West. He played college basketball for the UNLV Runnin' Rebels and Florida Gulf Coast Eagles before playing professionally in Greece, Germany, Hungary, Thailand, Kosovo and Romania.

== Early life ==
Morant was born in Miami, Florida. He started high school at Mountain View High School in Tucson, Arizona.

Morant moved to Las Vegas, where he attended Bishop Gorman High School. He averaged 8.0 points, 5.0 rebounds and 3.0 blocks as a junior in 2010–11, and 10.6 points and 8.0 rebounds as a senior in 2011–12, helping the Gaels to two straight Nevada State Championships. He also won state championships in two track events as a senior, the high jump and triple jump.

== College career ==
Morant began his college basketball career with the UNLV Runnin' Rebels, but redshirted the 2012–13 season. He played 13 games in the 2013–14 season, averaging 3.8 minutes per game with eight total points scored.

In May 2014, Morant transferred to the Florida Gulf Coast Eagles. He decided to transfer to a school closer to his father, who suffered a stroke in Florida.

In 90 games over three seasons for Florida Gulf Coast, Morant made 69 starts and averaged 7.1 points, 6.0 rebounds and 1.4 blocks in 21.3 minutes per game. He helped the Eagles win the ASUN tournament in 2016 and 2017, earning A-Sun All-Tournament Team honors in 2017. He also earned Atlantic Sun Defensive Player of the Year honors for the 2016–17 season.

== Professional career ==
In August 2017, Morant signed with Aris Thessaloniki of the Greek Basket League. He played in six league games and three BCL games before leaving the team in December 2017.

For the 2018–19 season, Morant joined Artland Dragons of the German ProA. In 29 games, he averaged 13.0 points, 6.7 rebounds and 1.2 blocks per game.

For the 2019–20 season, Morant joined Szolnoki Olajbányász of the Hungarian League. He averaged 6.9 points and 6.3 rebounds in 10 games between September 28 and December 6. In February 2020, he joined Adroit of the Thailand Basketball League. He averaged 11.0 points, 18.3 rebounds, 1.7 assists and 2.0 steals in three games.

For the 2020–21 season, Morant joined KB Ylli of the Kosovo League. He helped the team win the championship and averaged 8.7 points, 8.8 rebounds, 1.0 assists and 1.1 steals in 32 games.

For the 2021–22 season, Morant joined CSM Focșani of the Romanian Liga Națională. In 19 games, he averaged 5.6 points, 5.6 rebounds, 1.4 assists and 1.0 steals per game.

In May 2022, Morant joined the SoCal Moguls of The Basketball League (TBL). He averaged 6.0 points and 2.4 rebounds in five games.

Morant returned to KB Ylli for the 2022–23 Kosovo League season. In 20 games, he averaged 4.1 points and 4.4 rebounds per game.

In February 2024, Morant signed with the Cockburn Cougars of the NBL1 West in Australia for the 2024 season.

== Personal life ==
Morant is the son of Linda Bruce and Leroy Morant. He has seven siblings: Nicole, Nakia, Leroy, Naquanda, Nicholas, Levar and Sadie.
