= Marc-Eddy Norelia =

Haitian basketball player

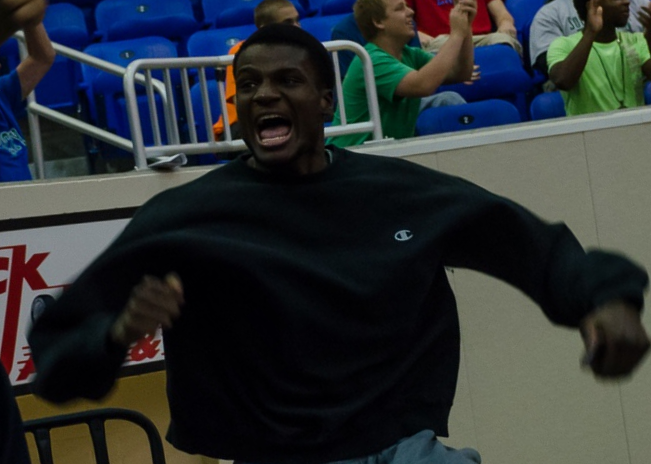
- Norelia in 2013

Free agent
- Position: Power forward

Personal information
- Born: February 5, 1993 (age 33) Port-au-Prince, Haiti
- Listed height: 6 ft 8 in (2.03 m)
- Listed weight: 218 lb (99 kg)

Career information
- High school: Olympia (Orlando, Florida)
- College: Tulane (2012–2013); Florida Gulf Coast (2014–2017)
- NBA draft: 2017: undrafted

Career history
- 2018–2019: Caen Basket Calvados
- 2019–2020: Oliveirense
- 2020–2021: Oviedo
- 2021–2022: Earthfriends Tokyo Z
- 2022–2023: San Pablo Burgos
- 2023: Melilla Baloncesto
- 2024–2025: Caen Basket Calvados

Career highlights
- First-team All-Atlantic Sun (2016); Atlantic Sun tournament MVP (2016)

Marc-Eddy Norelia (born February 5, 1993) is a Haitian professional basketball player who last played for Caen Basket Calvados of the Élite 2. He played college basketball for Florida Gulf Coast University of the ASUN Conference. He stands 6 ft 8 in (2.03 m) and plays the power forward position. Before transferring to Florida Gulf Coast, Norelia had a brief stint with Tulane University, where he competed for the Green Wave. He attended high school in Orlando, Florida, with Olympia High School.

== Early life ==
Norelia was born on February 5, 1993, in Port-au-Prince, Haiti. His father, Marc Elie, worked as a welder and his mother sold charcoal in the street markets. The family had a larger house than most people in their area, but Haiti had unreliable electricity, unpaved and poorly maintained streets, and unfinished houses. Norelia grew up speaking only Creole, and he did not know any English at the time. Once Marc-Eddy was born, his father began attempting to have their family move out of the country. Marc Elie's mother had already emigrated to the United States in Deerfield Beach, Florida, and she had encouraged them to do the same. When Marc-Eddy became three years old, they flew on an airplane to Deerfield Beach, where there was a fair amount of Haitians.

In Florida, Norelia grew unhappy, and he would spend most of his time playing video games. He knew little English in even fourth grade. This forced him to take English for speakers of other languages (ESOL) classes throughout this stage of his school life. The family moved back to Haiti for about one year, and returned to the United States in Apopka, Florida. Marc-Eddy began playing basketball and football with his friends by sixth grade, and he was convinced to try out for the Wolf Lake Middle School basketball team in seventh grade. At the time, he was 5 ft 5 in (1.65 m), and he was cut. This drove him to practice even more for the following season, for which he grew nearly ten inches. At this point, he stood about 6 ft 2 in (1.88 m).

== High school career ==
Norelia attended Olympia High School in Orlando, Florida, where he played three years of varsity basketball under head coach Mark Griseck. By ninth grade, he began lifting weights, but he only managed to play at the junior varsity level. As a sophomore, in his first season with the varsity squad, Norelia was visited by Jacksonville University for his talent. After his junior season, he was averaging 13.1 points and 7.5 rebounds and earned Class 6A All-State First Team honors. Norelia starred for Olympia alongside future college teammate Brett Comer. As a senior, he averaged 16.9 points and 9.7 rebounds and was rated among the top 20 players in the state. His final season also helped him garner Class 8A All-State First Team, All-Central Florida First Team, and All-Metro Conference West Division accolades.

== Professional career ==
In 2018, Norelia signed with Caen Basket Calvados of the LNB Pro B. He averaged 7.3 points and 3.9 rebounds per game. Norelia spent the 2019–20 season in Portugal with Oliveirense, averaging 16.5 points, 6.5 rebounds, 1.5 assists and 1.3 steals per game. He helped the team reach the league final and was selected to Eurobasket.com All-Portuguese League 2nd Team. On August 30, 2020, Norelia signed with Oviedo of the LEB Oro.

On August 5, 2022, he has signed with San Pablo Burgos of the LEB Oro.
