= Sherwood Brown =

American basketball player (born 1991)

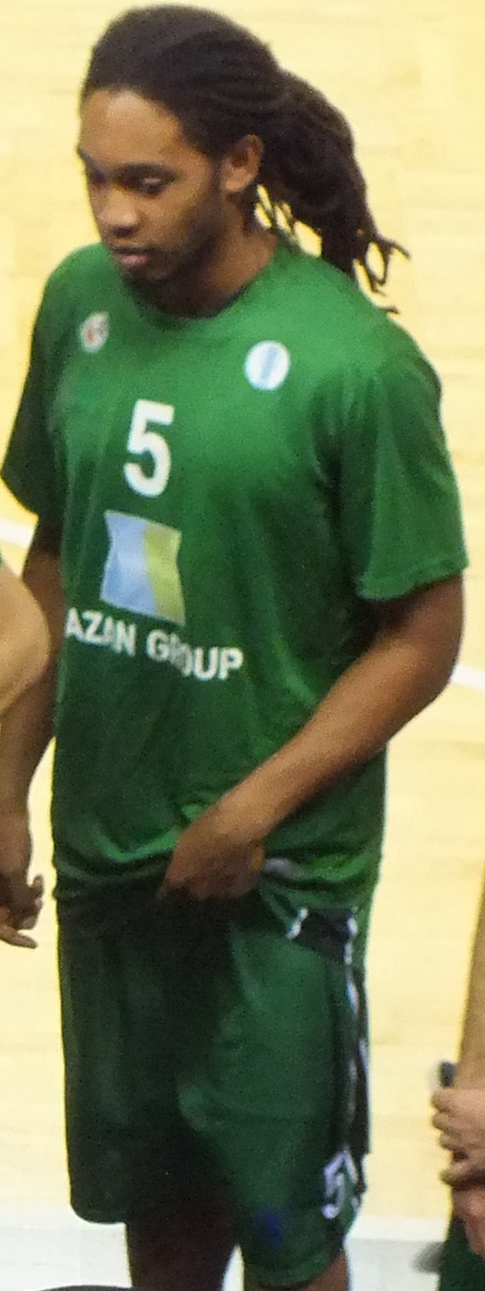
- Sherwood T. Brown, October 2013

Personal information
- Born: August 2, 1991 (age 35) Columbus, Georgia, U.S.
- Listed height: 6 ft 4 in (1.93 m)
- Listed weight: 201 lb (91 kg)

Career information
- High school: Olympia (Orlando, Florida)
- College: Florida Gulf Coast (2009–2013)
- NBA draft: 2013: undrafted
- Playing career: 2013–2025
- Position: Shooting guard

Career history
- 2014: Maine Red Claws
- 2014: Fuerza Guinda de Nogales
- 2014–2015: Maine Red Claws
- 2015–2016: Byblos
- 2016–2017: White Wings Hanau
- 2017–2018: Al Rayyan SC
- 2018–2021: Timișoara
- 2021: Lahti Basketball
- 2022: Timișoara
- 2022: Montreal Alliance
- 2022–2023: CD Póvoa
- 2023–2024: CSM Focșani
- 2024–2025: Al-Karkh

Career highlights
- Lebanese Cup champion (2016); AP honorable mention All-American (2013); Atlantic Sun Player of the Year (2013); First-team All-Atlantic Sun (2013)

Sherwood Terrell Brown (born August 2, 1991) is an American former professional basketball player. From 2009 to 2013, he played college basketball at Florida Gulf Coast University in Fort Myers, Florida. Brown was named the Atlantic Sun Conference Player of the Year in 2013 as a senior.

== Early life ==
Brown was born in Columbus, Georgia and lived there for about five months, before moving to Waverly Hall, Georgia for a year. His family subsequently moved to Florida, where Brown has resided since. Brown averaged 11.4 points, 5.6 rebounds, and 1.3 steals per game during his senior year at Olympia High School in Orlando, Florida.

== College career ==
=== Freshman season ===
Brown played in 27 games in his first year at Florida Gulf Coast University, and started five games. He averaged 4.5 points and 3.6 rebounds per game. In his college debut, he had six points and four rebounds against Michigan State. His season high came in a win over Belmont, when he scored 16 points and collected 7 rebounds.

=== Sophomore season ===
Brown started 5 of 27 games again in his second year at Florida Gulf Coast University. He ended the season averaging 7.0 points and 3.2 rebound per game. He shot 46 percent in three-point shots to lead the Atlantic Sun Conference. Brown scored his career high in points against USC Upstate with 28.

=== Junior season ===
In his junior season, Brown made the ASUN Conference second time. His season high for points was when he scored 24 points and hauled in seven rebounds. He Averaged 12.8 points and 5.9 rebounds a game that season. Brown won the Atlantic Sun player of the week award on January 31, 2012, and he was also named to the Atlantic Sun All-Tournament team.

=== Senior season ===
Brown won the Atlantic Sun player of the year in his senior season. He was the third player in Florida Gulf Coast Eagles history to score 1,000 points and the first FGCU player to score both 1000 points and grab 500 rebounds in his career. He scored 16 points and brought in 11 rebounds to help Florida Gulf Coast win its first ever Atlantic Sun title and its first career NCAA Tournament appearance in just the school's second year of full Division I eligibility. In the 2013 NCAA Men's Division I Basketball Tournament, Brown, scoring 24 points and grabbing 9 rebounds, led his Eagles to 78–68 win over No. 2 seed Georgetown. Then, his #15 seeded Eagles made history, by beating #7 seed San Diego State, 81–71. It marked the first time a No. 15 seed reached the sweet sixteen. Brown scored 17 points and added 8 rebounds in the contest. His final game was against the Florida Gators, where the Eagles' Cinderella run ended with a 62–50 loss.

== Professional career ==
Brown went undrafted in the 2013 NBA draft. On July 17, 2013, he signed a one-year deal (with the option of a second) with Maccabi Haifa of the Israeli Basketball Premier League. However, he was later released by Maccabi on October 27, 2013, before appearing in a game for them.

On January 8, 2014, Brown was acquired by the Maine Red Claws. On May 12, 2014, he signed with Fuerza Guinda de Nogales of Mexico for the 2014 CIBACOPA season.

On October 31, 2014, Brown was reacquired by the Maine Red Claws.

On November 19, 2015, Brown was acquired by Byblos Club of the FLB League.

In 2021, Brown signed with Lahti Basketball of the Finnish league and averaged 12.8 points, 4.0 rebounds, and 1.3 steals per game. On January 29, 2022, he signed with Timișoara of the Romanian Liga Națională.

In May 2022, Brown returned to North America and signed with the Montreal Alliance of the Canadian Elite Basketball League.
