= Dave Balza =

American basketball player-coach

Biographical details
- Born: August 15, 1969 (age 57); South Haven, Michigan, U.S.
- Education: University of Michigan

Coaching career (HC unless noted)
- 1991–1996: Cleveland State (asst.)
- 1996–1998: Ashland (asst.)
- 1998–2001: Saint Joseph's (IN)
- 2002–2011: Florida Gulf Coast
- 2012–2013: Bethany Lutheran College
- 2013–2021: Palm Beach Atlantic

Head coaching record
- Overall: 290–289 (.501)
- Tournaments: 0–1 (NCAA Division II)

Accomplishments and honors

Championships
- 2012 Upper Midwest Athletic Conference

Awards
- GLVC Coach of the Year (2001); Region Coach of the Year (2001); National Independent Coach of the Year (2005); UMAC Coach of the Year (2011–12)

David William Balza (born August 15, 1969) is a former American college basketball coach for the Palm Beach Atlantic Sailfish and was the first head men's basketball coach in Florida Gulf Coast University history. He served from their inaugural season in 2002–03 through the 2010–11 season, after which he was fired. He was student manager for the 1988–89 Michigan Wolverines men's basketball team that won the 1989 NCAA Division I men's basketball tournament. He retired from coaching at the conclusion of the 2020-21 season.

== Head coaching record ==
Record table
Season	Team	Overall	Conference	Standing	Postseason
Saint Joseph's College (Indiana) (Great Lakes Valley Conference) (1998–2001)
1998–99	St. Joseph's	9–18	8–14	8th	
1999–00	St. Joseph's	8–18	4–16	T-11th	
2000–01	St. Joseph's	18–13	11–9	4th	
St. Joseph's:		35–49 (.417)	23–39 (.371)		
Florida Gulf Coast Eagles (Independent) (2002–2007)
2002–03	Florida Gulf Coast	23–9			
2003–04	Florida Gulf Coast	22–5			
2004–05	Florida Gulf Coast	24–7			Division II First Round
2005–06	Florida Gulf Coast	18–12			
2006–07	Florida Gulf Coast	27–6			
Florida Gulf Coast Eagles (Atlantic Sun Conference) (2007–2011)
2007–08	Florida Gulf Coast	10–21	6–10	8th	
2008–09	Florida Gulf Coast	11–20	7–13	9th	
2009–10	Florida Gulf Coast	8–21	5–15	10th	
2010–11	Florida Gulf Coast	10–20	7–13	7th	
Florida Gulf Coast:		153–121 (.558)	25–51 (.329)		
Bethany Lutheran Vikings (Upper Midwest Athletic Conference) (2011–2013)
2011–12	Bethany Lutheran	16–11	13–1	1st	
2012–13	Bethany Lutheran	12–14	9–5	2nd	
Bethany Lutheran:		28–25 (.528)	22–6 (.786)		
Palm Beach Atlantic Sailfish (Independent) (2013–2016)
2013–14	Palm Beach Atlantic	8–18			
2014–15	Palm Beach Atlantic	10–16			
2015–16	Palm Beach Atlantic	12–14			
Palm Beach Atlantic Sailfish (Sunshine State Conference) (2016–present)
2016–17	Palm Beach Atlantic	16–13	10–8	T-4th	
2017–18	Palm Beach Atlantic	15–17	9–11	6th	
2018–19	Palm Beach Atlantic	13–16	9–11	7th	
Palm Beach Atlantic:		74–94 (.440)	28–30 (.483)		
Total:		290–289 (.501)			
