= Pat Chambers =

American basketball coach (born 1970)

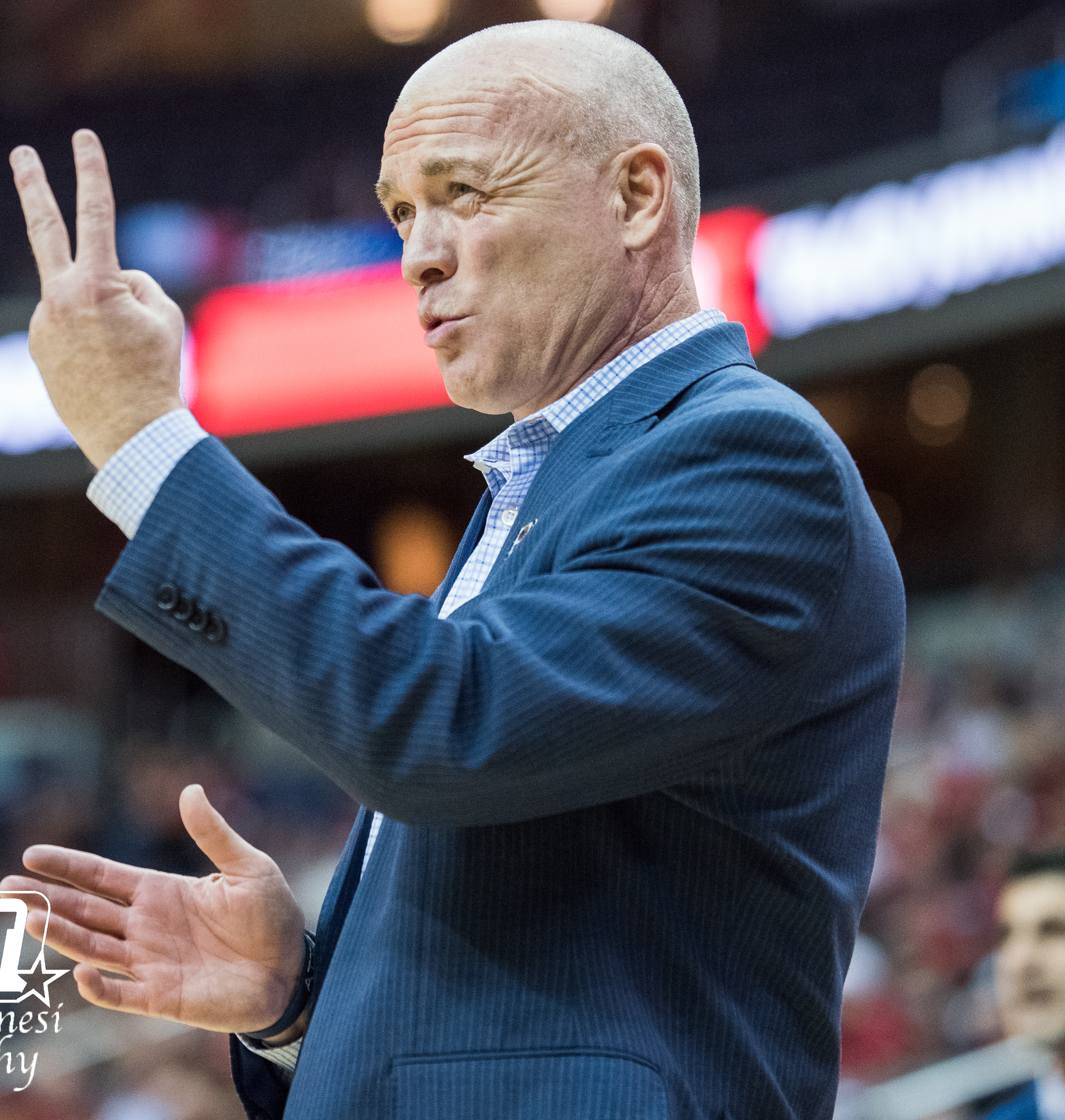
- Chambers in 2017

Current position
- Title: Head coach
- Team: Florida Gulf Coast
- Conference: ASUN
- Record: 68–70 (.493)

Biographical details
- Born: December 13, 1970 (age 55); Newtown Square, Pennsylvania, U.S.

Playing career
- 1990–1994: Philadelphia
- Position: Point guard

Coaching career (HC unless noted)
- 1995–1996: Delaware Valley (assistant)
- 2001–2004: Philadelphia (assistant)
- 2004–2009: Villanova (assistant)
- 2009–2011: Boston University
- 2011–2020: Penn State
- 2021–2022: La Salle (assistant)
- 2022–present: Florida Gulf Coast

Head coaching record
- Overall: 258–248 (.510)
- Tournaments: 0–1 (NCAA Division I); 5–0 (NIT); 4–3 (CBI)

Accomplishments and honors

Championships
- NIT (2018); America East tournament (2011)

Patrick Brian Chambers (born December 13, 1970) is an American college basketball coach and is the current head coach at Florida Gulf Coast University. He is formerly the head men's basketball coach at Penn State and Boston University.

== Biography ==
Born in Newtown Square, Pennsylvania, Chambers played collegiate basketball at Philadelphia University from 1990 to 1994. Despite joining the team without a scholarship, he left it as the starting point guard and the team record-holder in assists. He is currently 7th all-time in steals and led the team to four NCAA Division II Sweet 16 appearances and two Elite Eight finishes.

Chambers took over for Dennis Wolff as the head coach at Boston University following the 2008–09 season. He was previously the associate head coach at Villanova University. He started at Villanova as director of operations in May 2004. He was promoted to assistant coach after one season and finally Associate Head Coach in June 2008. Prior to Villanova, Chambers was an assistant at Philadelphia University, Delaware Valley College and Episcopal Academy. In his first season at BU, Chambers led the Terriers to a 21–14 overall record and an 11–5 mark in league play. The Terriers fell just short of an America East Tournament Championship after falling to University of Vermont 83–70 on March 13, 2010. The team did qualify for the 3rd annual College Basketball Invitational and won their first postseason game since 1959. They also hosted the first postseason game in program history, defeating Morehead State University in overtime at Case Gymnasium.

In Chambers' second season at Boston University, he again led the Terriers to a 21–14 overall mark, including a 12–4 mark in conference play. They defeated Stony Brook University at Agganis Arena to win their sixth conference title and clinch an automatic bid into the NCAA tournament. They received a #16 seed and fell to the #1 seed Kansas Jayhawks in the round of 64 by a score of 72–53. The game marked the Terriers' first appearance in the NCAA tournament since 2002.

Penn State announced Chambers as the 12th head coach in Nittany Lion basketball history in June 2011. The best season Chambers had at Penn State was the 2017–18 season where the team finished 26–13 and had its highest Big Ten finish in his tenure. The season was highlighted with 3 wins over Ohio State and a 2018 NIT Championship. However, in 2019 Chambers had the team ranked at #23 for their first AP appearance since 1996 after a win over then #4 ranked Maryland and a hot 10–2 start. They reportedly would have made their first appearance in the NCAA Tournament since 2011 had the COVID-19 pandemic not shut down the 2019-20 collegiate season.

In July 2020, The Undefeated (now Andscape) reported that in January 2019, Chambers told freshman point guard Rasir Bolton that he knew he was feeling a good deal of pressure, and wanted to "loosen the noose around your neck." Bolton told his parents about the comment, and his parents drove to State College for several meetings with Penn State officials about Chambers. The relationship between Bolton and Chambers never recovered, and Bolton received an NCAA waiver to transfer to Iowa State and resume playing the following season. According to The Undefeated, Penn State officials scolded Chambers and referred Bolton to a psychologist who suggested Bolton get used to Chambers' personality type. However, they didn't mount a serious inquiry into the incident until after Bolton began the transfer process. Following The Undefeated report, Penn State launched an internal investigation into Chambers' treatment of players and assistant coaches. As a result of the investigation, Chambers resigned on October 21, 2020, a month before the start of the 2020-21 season. Assistant coach Jim Ferry was named interim coach for the season. According to David Jones of The Patriot-News, Penn State's investigation centered around verbal abuse and inappropriate comments on Chambers' part. According to several former players and coaches, Chambers had a short fuse and a penchant for "arbitrary eruptions." Jones said that when athletic director Sandy Barbour and school president Eric Barron received the findings, what they saw was enough for them to call Chambers in and force his resignation. At a press converence, Barbour said there was no single tipping point that led to Chambers' resignation. She did say, however, that in the course of the review, a new allegation came to light against Chambers that was "previously unknown to Penn State" and unrelated to Bolton's claims.

In November 2021, Chambers was hired as an assistant coach at La Salle under Ashley Howard. He was hired as head coach of Florida Gulf Coast University on March 14, 2022.

Chambers and his wife Courtney have four children: Grace, Ryan, Caitlin, and Patrick.

== Head coaching record ==
Record table
| Season | Team | Overall | Conference | Standing | Postseason |
|---|---|---|---|---|---|
Boston University Terriers (America East Conference) (2009–2011)
| 2009–10 | Boston University | 21–14 | 11–5 | 4th | CBI semifinal |
| 2010–11 | Boston University | 21–14 | 12–4 | 2nd | NCAA Division I Round of 64 |
| Boston University: | | 42–28 (.600) | 23–9 (.719) | | |
Penn State Nittany Lions (Big Ten Conference) (2011–2020)
| 2011–12 | Penn State | 12–20 | 4–14 | T–11th | |
| 2012–13 | Penn State | 10–21 | 2–16 | 12th | |
| 2013–14 | Penn State | 16–18 | 6–12 | T–10th | CBI quarterfinal |
| 2014–15 | Penn State | 18–16 | 4–14 | 13th | |
| 2015–16 | Penn State | 16–16 | 7–11 | 10th | |
| 2016–17 | Penn State | 15–18 | 6–12 | T–12th | |
| 2017–18 | Penn State | 26–13 | 9–9 | T–6th | NIT champion |
| 2018–19 | Penn State | 14–18 | 7–13 | T–10th | |
| 2019–20 | Penn State | 21–10 | 11–9 | T–5th | |
| Penn State: | | 148–150 (.497) | 56–110 (.337) | | |
Florida Gulf Coast Eagles (Atlantic Sun Conference) (2022–present)
| 2022–23 | Florida Gulf Coast | 17–15 | 7–11 | T–9th | |
| 2023–24 | Florida Gulf Coast | 14–18 | 8–8 | T–6th | |
| 2024–25 | Florida Gulf Coast | 19–15 | 13–5 | 3rd | CBI Semifinal |
| 2025–26 | Florida Gulf Coast | 16–18 | 8–10 | T–5th | |
| 2026–27 | Florida Gulf Coast | 2–4 | 0–0 | | |
| Florida Gulf Coast: | | 68–70 (.493) | 36–34 (.514) | | |
| Total: | | 258–248 (.510) | | | |
National champion Postseason invitational champion Conference regular season champion Conference regular season and conference tournament champion Division regular season champion Division regular season and conference tournament champion Conference tournament champion
