= Michael Fly =

American basketball coach

Current position
- Title: Assistant coach
- Team: Florida State
- Conference: ACC

Biographical details
- Born: May 29, 1983 (age 43); Fulton, Kentucky
- Education: Kentucky

Coaching career (HC unless noted)
- 2004–2005: Georgetown (KY) (assistant)
- 2011–2018: Florida Gulf Coast (assistant)
- 2018–2022: Florida Gulf Coast
- 2023–2025: Jacksonville (assoc.)
- 2025-present: Florida State (assistant)

Administrative career (AD unless noted)
- 2006–2007: Charlotte Bobcats (vid. coord.)
- 2008–2011: Florida State (vid. coord.)
- 2022–2023: Missouri (dir. of scout. & anal.)

Head coaching record
- Overall: 56–60 (.483)

Michael Fly (born May 29, 1983) is an American college basketball coach and former head coach at Florida Gulf Coast University.

== Coaching career ==
Fly started coaching as a student at the University of Kentucky, assisting at NAIA Georgetown College for one season. After graduation, Fly became a video coordinator assistant for the NBA's Charlotte Bobcats for one season before taking a one-year internship at NCAA's corporate offices. He returned to coaching joining Leonard Hamilton's staff at Florida State where he served as a video coordinator for three seasons. When Seminoles assistant Andy Enfield took the head coaching job at Florida Gulf Coast, Fly followed him to the Eagles as an assistant coach, and remained with the team as an assistant under Joe Dooley, as well. As an assistant, Fly was part of FGCU's Sweet 16 run in 2013, and was part of two other NCAA Tournament appearances in 2016 and 2017.

On April 5, 2018, Fly was promoted to become the fourth head coach in Florida Gulf Coast history, replacing Dooley who accepted the same position at East Carolina.

On March 5, 2022, Fly was fired as head coach at FGCU.

== Head coaching record ==
Record table
| Season | Team | Overall | Conference | Standing | Postseason |
|---|---|---|---|---|---|
Florida Gulf Coast Eagles (ASUN Conference) (2018–2022)
| 2018–19 | Florida Gulf Coast | 14–18 | 9–7 | T–3rd | |
| 2019–20 | Florida Gulf Coast | 10–22 | 7–9 | T–6th | |
| 2020–21 | Florida Gulf Coast | 10–8 | 4–5 | 6th | |
| 2021–22 | Florida Gulf Coast | 22–12 | 10–6 | 3rd (East) | TBC second round |
| Florida Gulf Coast: | | 56–60 (.483) | 30–28 (.517) | | |
| Total: | | 56–60 (.483) | | | |
