= Florida Gulf Coast Eagles men's basketball =

NCAA Division I men's basketball program

2026–27 Florida Gulf Coast Eagles men's basketball team
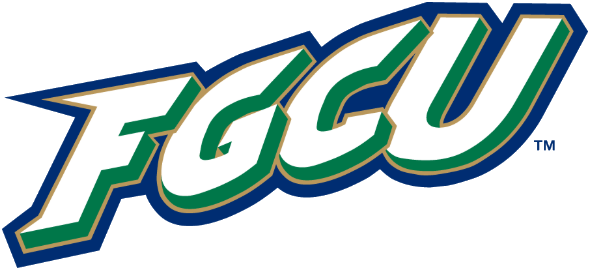
- University: Florida Gulf Coast University
- First season: 2002–03; 24 years ago
- Head coach: Pat Chambers (4th season)
- Location: Fort Myers, Florida
- Arena: Alico Arena (capacity: 4,633)
- Conference: Atlantic Sun Conference
- Nickname: Eagles
- Colors: Cobalt blue and emerald green

NCAA Division I tournament Sweet Sixteen
- 2013

NCAA Division I tournament appearances
- 2005*, 2013, 2016, 2017

Conference tournament champions
- 2013, 2016, 2017

Conference regular-season champions
- 2014, 2017, 2018

Uniforms
Home	Away
- * at Division II level

The Florida Gulf Coast Eagles men's basketball team is the men's basketball team that represents Florida Gulf Coast University in Fort Myers, Florida, United States. The school's team currently competes in the ASUN Conference. The Eagles are currently coached by Pat Chambers.

In 2002, Florida Gulf Coast became an independent member of NCAA Division II. Florida Gulf Coast also started its men's basketball team, with Dave Balza as head coach from the inaugural 2002–03 to the 2010–11 season. He was succeeded by Andy Enfield from 2011–13, who took the Eagles to the Sweet Sixteen as the first ever 15-seed to do such. After putting FGCU on the map with their new "Dunk City" moniker, Enfield accepted the men's basketball position at USC.

In 2006, Florida Gulf Coast applied for NCAA Division I status and became a transitory Division I effective in the 2007–08 season. Florida Gulf Coast became a full Division I member on August 11, 2011.

In total, the Eagles have appeared in three NCAA tournaments, most recently in 2017. The Eagles men's basketball team is best known for their run in the 2013 NCAA Division I men's basketball tournament, their first since moving up to Division I. In the Round of 64 at the 2013 NCAA tournament, the Eagles defeated the #2 seed Georgetown 78–68. It was only the seventh time that a 15th seed had defeated a 2nd seed, and the second-highest margin of victory for one. Two days later in the Round of 32, the Eagles defeated the #7 seed San Diego State 81–71, becoming the first 15th seed to ever advance to the Sweet 16. The school was referred to as "Dunk City" or "Florida Dunk Coast" on many media outlets such as ESPN and CBS due to their high-flying athletic finishing style.

== Season results ==
The Eagles participated in their first Division I postseason tournament in 2013, qualifying for the NCAA Tournament by winning the ASUN Conference Championship, beating top-seeded Mercer in the conference tournament final. On March 22, 2013, the Eagles, the 15th seed in the South Region, scored one of the biggest upsets in NCAA Tournament history, defeating second-seeded Georgetown 78–68. They were only the seventh #15 seed to defeat a #2 seed, the first being Richmond in its 1991 victory over Syracuse. Two days later, they defeated seventh seeded San Diego State to become the first #15 seed ever to advance to the Sweet Sixteen. Their run ended there in a 62–50 loss to third seeded Florida. This is "officially" the fourth-deepest run by a first-time tournament participant in NCAA history, behind only Indiana State advancing all the way to the national championship game in 1979 and Charlotte and Georgia reaching the Final Four in 1977 and 1983, respectively. Southwestern Louisiana, now known as Louisiana–Lafayette, advanced to the Sweet 16 in its first appearance as well, in 1972, but that appearance was vacated due to NCAA sanctions. Coach Andy Enfield was hired by USC on April 1. To replace him, the Eagles hired Joe Dooley, an assistant from Kansas.

== Postseason ==
=== NCAA Division I Tournament results ===
The Eagles have appeared in the NCAA Division I Tournament three times. Their combined record is 3–3. Their highest seed was #14 in 2017.

Year	Seed	Round	Opponent	Result
2013	#15	First Round; Second Round; Sweet Sixteen	#2 Georgetown #7 San Diego State #3 Florida	W 78–68; W 81–71; L 50–62
2016	#16	First Four; First Round	#16 Fairleigh Dickinson #1 North Carolina	W 96–65; L 67–83
2017	#14	First Round	#3 Florida State	L 80–86

=== NIT results ===
The Eagles have appeared in the National Invitation Tournament (NIT) two times. Their combined record is 0–2.

Year	Round	Opponent	Result
2014	First Round	Florida State	L 53–58
2018	First Round	Oklahoma State	L 68–80

=== CBI results ===
The Eagles have participated in one College Basketball Invitational (CBI) tournament. Their record is 1–1.

Year	Round	Opponent	Result
2025	Quarterfinals; Semifinals	Army; Cleveland State	W 68–65; L 65–72

=== CIT results ===
The Eagles have appeared in the CollegeInsider.com Postseason Tournament (CIT) one time. Their record is 0–1.

Year	Round	Opponent	Result
2015	First Round	Texas A&M–Corpus Christi	L 69–75

=== The Basketball Classic results ===
The Eagles have appeared in The Basketball Classic one time. Their record is 1–1.

Year	Round	Opponent	Result
2022	First Round; Second Round	Detroit Mercy; Coastal Carolina	W 95-79; L 68-84

=== NCAA Division II Tournament results ===
The Eagles have appeared in the NCAA Division II Tournament one time. Their record is 0–1.

Year	Round	Opponent	Result
2005	Regional Quarterfinals	Eckerd	L 79–81

== Notable international players ==
- Eli Abaev (born 1998), American-Israeli basketball player for Hapoel Be'er Sheva in the Israeli Basketball Premier League
- Tavian Dunn-Martin, (born 1998), CEBL point guard
