= 2025–26 Louisiana Tech Bulldogs basketball team =

American college basketball season

2025–26 Louisiana Tech Bulldogs basketball
- Conference: Conference USA
- Record: 20–14 (11–9 C-USA)
- Head coach: Talvin Hester (4th season)
- Assistant coaches: Winston Hines; Darshawn McClellan; Tyson Batiste; Tim McGraw; Kavin Gilder-Tilbury
- Home arena: Thomas Assembly Center

2025–26 Conference USA men's basketball standings
	Conf.				Overall
Team	W		L	PCT	W		L	PCT
Liberty	17	–	3	.850	25	–	7	.781
Sam Houston	13	–	7	.650	22	–	11	.667
Western Kentucky	11	–	9	.550	18	–	14	.563
Louisiana Tech	11	–	9	.550	20	–	14	.588
Middle Tennessee	11	–	9	.550	17	–	15	.531
Kennesaw State †	10	–	10	.500	21	–	13	.618
Jacksonville State	10	–	10	.500	15	–	17	.469
FIU	8	–	12	.400	15	–	17	.469
Missouri State	8	–	12	.400	16	–	18	.471
New Mexico State	8	–	12	.400	16	–	16	.500
UTEP	7	–	13	.350	11	–	20	.355
Delaware	6	–	14	.300	10	–	21	.323
† 2026 CUSA tournament winner As of March 14, 2026

The 2025–26 Louisiana Tech Bulldogs basketball team represented Louisiana Tech University during the 2025–26 NCAA Division I men's basketball season. The Bulldogs, led by fourth-year head coach Talvin Hester, played their home games at Thomas Assembly Center in Ruston, Louisiana as members of Conference USA.

== Previous season ==
The Bulldogs finished the 2024–25 season 20–12, 9–9 in C-USA play, to finish in sixth place. They were defeated by Middle Tennessee in the quarterfinals of the C-USA tournament.

== Preseason ==
On October 9, 2025, Conference USA released their preseason poll. Louisiana Tech was picked to finish fifth in the conference.

=== Preseason rankings ===
C-USA Preseason Poll
Place	Team	Votes
1	Liberty	143 (11)
2	Kennesaw State	126 (1)
3	New Mexico State	113
4	Middle Tennessee	103
5	Louisiana Tech	82
6	Western Kentucky	79
7	Jacksonville State	67
8	UTEP	66
9	Sam Houston	56
10	FIU	36
11	Delaware	35
12	Missouri State	30
(#) first-place votes

=== Preseason All C-USA Team ===
Preseason All C-USA Team
Player	Year	Position
Kaden Cooper	Junior	Guard

== Roster ==
2025–26 Louisiana Tech Bulldogs men's basketball team
Players
Coaches

Pos.	#	Name	Height	Weight	Year	Previous school	Hometown
G	0	DJ Dudley	6 ft 3 in (1.91 m)	175 lb (79 kg)	Jr	Hutchinson Community College	Inglewood, California
F	2	Will Jeffress	6 ft 8 in (2.03 m)	215 lb (98 kg)	GS	Pittsburgh	Erie, Pennsylvania
G	3	AJ Bates	6 ft 3 in (1.91 m)	200 lb (91 kg)	So	Seven Lakes High School	Houston, Texas
G	4	Jaylen Fenner	6 ft 6 in (1.98 m)	210 lb (95 kg)	Fr	Atascocita High School	Humble, Texas
F	5	Avery Thomas II	6 ft 8 in (2.03 m)	210 lb (95 kg)	So	Jones College	Jackson, Mississippi
G	6	Keegan Rowell	6 ft 3 in (1.91 m)	180 lb (82 kg)	RS So	McLennan Community College	Lorena, Texas
F	7	Sir Issac Herron	6 ft 10 in (2.08 m)	235 lb (107 kg)	GS	Oral Roberts	Houston, Texas
G	8	Scooter Williams	6 ft 4 in (1.93 m)	205 lb (93 kg)	GS	East Texas A&M	Clarksville, Tennessee
F	10	Kylan Howze	6 ft 10 in (2.08 m)	235 lb (107 kg)	Jr	Jones College	Gulfport, Mississippi
G	11	Kaden Cooper	6 ft 6 in (1.98 m)	200 lb (91 kg)	Jr	Oklahoma	Ada, Oklahoma
F	14	Will Allen	6 ft 7 in (2.01 m)	225 lb (102 kg)	RS Sr	Bonnabel High School	New Orleans, Louisiana
C	21	Melian Martinez	7 ft 0 in (2.13 m)	230 lb (104 kg)	RS Jr	New Mexico Junior College	Santo Domingo, Dominican Republic
G	23	Lachlan Thompson (W)	6 ft 4 in (1.93 m)	175 lb (79 kg)	RS So	Choudrant High School	Choudrant, Louisiana
F	27	A'Meir Williams (injured)	6 ft 8 in (2.03 m)	230 lb (104 kg)	Fr	Kennedale High School	Kennedale, Texas

Head coach

- Talvin Hester (Texas Wesleyan)

Assistant coach(es)

- Winston Hines (Stillman)
- Darshawn McClellan (Vanderbilt)
- Tyson Batiste (Central Connecticut State)
- Tim McGraw (John Brown)
- Kavin Gilder-Tilbury (Texas State)

Legend

- (C) Team captain
- (S) Suspended
- (I) Ineligible
- (W) Walk-on
- Injured
- Current redshirt

Roster
Last update: December 6, 2025

== Schedule and results ==
Date time, TV	Rank^{#}	Opponent^{#}	Result	Record	High points	High rebounds	High assists	Site (attendance) city, state
Non-conference regular season
November 4, 2025*; 9:00 pm, MWN		at Nevada	L 50–77	0–1	9 – Tied	5 – Cooper	3 – Bates	Lawlor Events Center (7,144); Reno, NV
November 9, 2025*; 2:00 pm, ESPN+		Lyon	W 93–35	1–1	18 – Thomas II	9 – Tied	7 – Bates	Thomas Assembly Center (2,046); Ruston, LA
November 15, 2025*; 6:00 pm, ESPN+		Jackson State	W 68–51	2–1	15 – Tied	9 – Tied	8 – Bates	Thomas Assembly Center (2,106); Ruston, LA
November 19, 2025*; 6:00 pm, ESPN+		at Indiana State	L 51−60	2−2	23 – Williams	11 – Williams	1 – Tied	Hulman Center (4,442); Terre Haute, IN
November 26, 2025*; 6:30 pm, ESPN+		Indiana State; Louisiana Tech MTE	W 75−73	3−2	17 – Dudley	10 – Cooper	3 – Tied	Thomas Assembly Center (2,022); Ruston, LA
November 29, 2025*; 12:00 pm, ESPN+		Alcorn State; Louisiana Tech MTE	W 83–58	4–2	26 – Bates	9 – Cooper	6 – Bates	Thomas Assembly Center (1,938); Ruston, LA
December 3, 2025*; 6:00 pm, ESPN+		at Georgia Southern	L 69–77	4–3	26 – Dudley	5 – Jeffress	9 – Bates	Hill Convocation Center (1,921); Statesboro, GA
December 7, 2025*; 2:00 pm, ESPN+		Ecclesia	W 89–37	5–3	20 – Cooper	9 – Jeffress	10 – Bates	Thomas Assembly Center (1,967); Ruston, LA
December 13, 2025*; 2:00 pm, ESPN+		Louisiana	W 65–44	6–3	23 – Bates	20 – Cooper	8 – Bates	Thomas Assembly Center (2,320); Ruston, LA
December 17, 2025*; 6:30 pm, ESPN+		at Tulane	L 53–61	6–4	17 – Dudley	7 – Cooper	4 – Bates	Devlin Fieldhouse (1,030); New Orleans, LA
December 22, 2025*; 1:00 pm, ESPN+		Dallas Christian	W 90–37	7–4	24 – Cooper	15 – Thomas II	6 – Bates	Thomas Assembly Center (1,815); Ruston, LA
Conference USA regular season
December 29, 2025; 6:30 pm, ESPN+		UTEP	W 75–63	8–4 (1–0)	18 – Dudley	8 – Cooper	10 – Bates	Thomas Assembly Center (1,910); Ruston, LA
January 2, 2026; 6:30 pm, ESPN+		at Middle Tennessee	L 51–88	8–5 (1–1)	12 – Williams	6 – Thomas II	4 – Bates	Murphy Center (3,127); Murfreesboro, TN
January 4, 2026; 2:00 pm, ESPN+		at Western Kentucky	L 61–66	8–6 (1–2)	13 – Bates	13 – Cooper	3 – Tied	E. A. Diddle Arena (3,523); Bowling Green, KY
January 8, 2026; 6:00 pm, CBSSN		Liberty	L 56–72	8–7 (1–3)	17 – Dudley	10 – Thomas II	3 – Tied	Thomas Assembly Center (2,373); Ruston, LA
January 10, 2026; 2:00 pm, ESPN+		Delaware	W 70–68 ^{OT}	9–7 (2–3)	17 – Dudley	8 – Tied	4 – Bates	Thomas Assembly Center (2,166); Ruston, LA
January 14, 2026; 6:30 pm, ESPN+		Middle Tennessee	W 59–58	10–7 (3–3)	19 – Dudley	15 – Thomas II	5 – Bates	Thomas Assembly Center (2,082); Ruston, LA
January 17, 2026; 4:00 pm, ESPN+		at Jacksonville State	L 60–64	10–8 (3–4)	25 – Dudley	6 – Tied	2 – Dudley	Pete Mathews Coliseum (1,137); Jacksonville, AL
January 24, 2026; 2:00 pm, ESPN+		Kennesaw State	W 82–76	11–8 (4–4)	20 – Dudley	6 – Tied	8 – Bates	Thomas Assembly Center (1,852); Ruston, LA
January 28, 2026; 8:00 pm, ESPN+		at UTEP	W 69–59	12–8 (5–4)	20 – Dudley	11 – Thomas II	7 – Bates	Don Haskins Center (3,335); El Paso, TX
January 31, 2026; 9:00 pm, ESPN2		at Sam Houston	L 67–83	12–9 (5–5)	21 – Dudley	8 – Thomas II	6 – Bates	Bernard Johnson Coliseum (1,510); Huntsville, TX
February 4, 2026; 6:30 pm, ESPN+		New Mexico State	L 63–72	12–10 (5–6)	22 – Williams	10 – Fenner	5 – Bates	Thomas Assembly Center (2,127); Ruston, LA
February 7, 2026; 2:00 pm, ESPN+		Sam Houston	W 87–78	13–10 (6–6)	21 – Bates	11 – Thomas II	6 – Bates	Thomas Assembly Center (2,670); Ruston, LA
February 12, 2026; 7:30 pm, CBSSN		at Missouri State	W 79–78 ^{2OT}	14–10 (7–6)	19 – Thomas II	13 – Cooper	6 – Bates	Great Southern Bank Arena (2,079); Springfield, MO
February 14, 2026; 1:00 pm, ESPN+		at FIU	L 64–77	14–11 (7–7)	14 – Bates	4 – Williams	4 – Tied	Ocean Bank Convocation Center; Miami, FL
February 18, 2026; 6:30 pm, ESPN+		Jacksonville State	W 77–71	15–11 (8–7)	22 – Dudley	10 – Tied	15 – Bates	Thomas Assembly Center (1,959); Ruston, LA
February 21, 2026; 4:00 pm, ESPN+		at Kennesaw State	L 55–58	15–12 (8–8)	18 – Cooper	13 – Cooper	5 – Bates	VyStar Arena (1,827); Kennesaw, GA
February 26, 2026; 6:30 pm, ESPN+		Missouri State	W 72–70	16–12 (9–8)	27 – Dudley	8 – Allen	5 – Bates	Thomas Assembly Center (2,051); Ruston, LA
February 28, 2026; 2:00 pm, ESPN+		FIU	L 76−84	16−13 (9−9)	25 – Fenner	7 – Tied	7 – Bates	Thomas Assembly Center (2,265); Ruston, LA
March 5, 2026; 6:00 pm, ESPN+		at Liberty	W 76−71	17−13 (10−9)	34 – Bates	8 – Fenner	4 – Bates	Liberty Arena (3,134); Lynchburg, VA
March 7, 2026; 11:00 am, ESPN+		at Delaware	W 81−38	18−13 (11−9)	20 – Thomas II	7 – Cooper	9 – Bates	Bob Carpenter Center (2,369); Newark, DE
Conference USA tournament
March 12, 2026; 5:30 pm, ESPN+	(4)	vs. (5) Middle Tennessee; Quarterfinal	W 80–69	19–13	29 – Bates	9 – Thomas II	6 – Bates	Propst Arena (3,029); Huntsville, AL
March 13, 2026; 11:30 am, CBSSN	(4)	vs. (9) Missouri State; Semifinal	W 69–66	20–13	27 – Bates	12 – Thomas II	6 – Bates	Propst Arena (2,187); Huntsville, AL
March 14, 2026; 7:30 pm, CBSSN	(4)	vs. (6) Kennesaw State; Championship	L 60–71	20–14	10 – Tied	10 – Tied	8 – Bates	Propst Arena (3,235); Huntsville, AL
*Non-conference game. ^{#}Rankings from AP poll. (#) Tournament seedings in parentheses. All times are in Central.
