= 2026 Conference USA men's basketball tournament =

American college basketball tournament

- Classification: Division I
- Season: 2025–26
- Teams: 10
- Site: Von Braun Center (Propst Arena); Huntsville, Alabama
- Champions: Kennesaw State (1st title)
- Winning coach: Antoine Pettway (1st title)
- MVP: R J Johnson (Kennesaw State)
- Television: CBSSN, ESPN+

2025–26 Conference USA men's basketball standings
	Conf.				Overall
Team	W		L	PCT	W		L	PCT
Liberty	17	–	3	.850	26	–	8	.765
Sam Houston	13	–	7	.650	22	–	12	.647
Western Kentucky	11	–	9	.550	18	–	14	.563
Louisiana Tech	11	–	9	.550	20	–	14	.588
Middle Tennessee	11	–	9	.550	17	–	15	.531
Kennesaw State †	10	–	10	.500	21	–	14	.600
Jacksonville State	10	–	10	.500	15	–	17	.469
FIU	8	–	12	.400	15	–	17	.469
Missouri State	8	–	12	.400	16	–	18	.471
New Mexico State	8	–	12	.400	16	–	16	.500
UTEP	7	–	13	.350	11	–	20	.355
Delaware	6	–	14	.300	10	–	21	.323
† 2026 CUSA tournament winner

The 2026 Conference USA men's basketball tournament was the postseason men's basketball tournament for the 2025–26 season of the Conference USA. The tournament was held from March 10–14, 2026, at Von Braun Center (Propst Arena) in Huntsville, Alabama. The winner, Kennesaw State, received the conference's automatic bid to the 2026 NCAA Tournament.

== Seeds ==
Only ten of the conference's twelve teams will compete in the tournament. The top six teams will receive byes into the quarterfinal round. Teams will be seeded by record within the conference, with a tiebreaker system to seed teams with identical conference records.

Seed	School	Conference Record	Tiebreaker 1	Tiebreaker 2
1	Liberty	17–3		
2	Sam Houston	13–7		
3	Western Kentucky	11–9	3–0 vs. Louisiana Tech/Middle Tennessee	
4	Louisiana Tech	11–9	1–2 vs. Western Kentucky/Middle Tennessee	
5	Middle Tennessee	11–9	1–3 vs. Western Kentucky/Louisiana Tech	
6	Kennesaw State	10–10	1–1 vs. Liberty	
7	Jacksonville State	10–10	0–2 vs. Liberty	
8	FIU	8–12	3–1 vs. Missouri State/New Mexico State	2–0 vs. Louisiana Tech
9	Missouri State	8–12	3–1 vs. FIU/New Mexico State	0–2 vs. Louisiana Tech
10	New Mexico State	8–12	0–4 vs. FIU/Missouri State	
DNQ	UTEP	7–13		
DNQ	Delaware	6–14		

== Schedule ==
Game	Time *	Matchup	Score	Attendance	Television
First Round – Tuesday March 10
1	5:30 p.m.	No. 8 FIU vs. No. 9 Missouri State	72–75	2,509	ESPN+
2	8:00 p.m.	No. 7 Jacksonville State vs. No. 10 New Mexico State	63–68	3,207	ESPN+
Quarterfinals – Wednesday, March 11
3	5:30 p.m.	No. 1 Liberty vs. No. 9 Missouri State	69–77	3,233	ESPN+
4	8:00 p.m.	No. 2 Sam Houston vs. No. 10 New Mexico State	69–61	2,220	ESPN+
Quarterfinals – Thursday, March 12
5	5:30 p.m.	No. 4 Louisiana Tech vs. No. 5 Middle Tennessee	80–69	3,029	ESPN+
6	8:00 p.m.	No. 3 Western Kentucky vs. No. 6 Kennesaw State	87–96	3,029	ESPN+
Semifinals – Friday, March 13
7	11:30 a.m.	No. 4 Louisiana Tech vs. No. 9 Missouri State	69–66	2,187	CBSSN
8	2:00 p.m.	No. 2 Sam Houston vs. No. 6 Kennesaw State	73–79	2,467	CBSSN
Final – Saturday, March 14
9	7:30 p.m.	No. 4 Louisiana Tech vs. No. 6 Kennesaw State	60–71	3,235	CBSSN
* Game times in CDT; ()-ranking denotes tournament seeding.

== Bracket ==
First Round; March 10; ESPN+
8	FIU	72
9	Missouri State	75
7	Jacksonville State	63
10	New Mexico State	68

Quarterfinals; March 11 & 12; ESPN+
1	Liberty	69
9	Missouri State	77
4	Louisiana Tech	80
5	Middle Tennessee	69
2	Sam Houston	69
10	New Mexico State	61
3	Western Kentucky	87
6	Kennesaw State	96

Semifinals; March 13; CBSSN
9	Missouri State	66
4	Louisiana Tech	69
2	Sam Houston	73
6	Kennesaw State	79

Final; March 14; CBSSN
4	Louisiana Tech	60
6	Kennesaw State	71

== Game Summaries ==
=== First Round ===
ESPN+

March 10
5:30 p.m. CDT

Box Score

No. 8 FIU 72, No. 9 Missouri State 75
Scoring by half: 36–31, 36–44
Pts: 24 – Stephenson; Rebs: 13 – Dibami; Asts: 2 – Tied (2)	Pts: 15 – Williams; Rebs: 6 – Cunningham; Asts: 8 – Palek III
Game 1

Von Braun Center (Propst Arena)
Huntsville, AL
Attendance: 2,509
Referees: Divine, Mathis, Murley

ESPN+

March 10
8:00 p.m. CDT

Box Score

No. 7 Jacksonville State 63, No. 10 New Mexico State 68
Scoring by half: 28–39, 35–29
Pts: 23 – El Moutaouakkil; Rebs: 11 – El Moutaouakkil; Asts: 4 – Tied (2)	Pts: 17 – Jones; Rebs: 5 – Tied (3); Asts: 3 – Jones
Game 2

Von Braun Center (Propst Arena)
Huntsville, AL
Attendance: 3,207
Referees: Harris, Nieves, Wallace

=== Quarterfinal Round ===
ESPN+

March 11
5:30 p.m. CDT

Box Score

No. 1 Liberty 69, No. 9 Missouri State 77
Scoring by half: 37–33, 32–44
Pts: 20 – Cleveland; Rebs: 14 – Cleveland; Asts: 5 – Porter	Pts: 31 – Osei-Bonsu; Rebs: 9 – Palek III; Asts: 4 – Tied (2)
Game 1

Von Braun Center (Propst Arena)
Huntsville, AL
Attendance: 3,233
Referees: Curran, Ford, Shows

ESPN+

March 11
8:00 p.m. CDT

Box Score

No. 2 Sam Houston 69, No. 10 New Mexico State 61
Scoring by half: 37-26, 32-35
Pts: 17 – Natt; Rebs: 16 – Natt; Asts: 3 – Ilic	Pts: 19 – Jones; Rebs: 9 – Mullen; Asts: 2 – Tied (2)
Game 2

Von Braun Center (Propst Arena)
Huntsville, AL
Attendance: 2,220
Referees: Jarrett, Jordan, Shortt

ESPN+

March 12
5:30 p.m. CDT

Box Score

No. 4 Louisiana Tech 80, No. 5 Middle Tennessee 69
Scoring by half: 39-25, 41-44
Pts: 29 – Bates; Rebs: 9 – Thomas II; Asts: 6 – Bates	Pts: 20 – Green; Rebs: 7 – Alston; Asts: 4 – Smith
Game 3

Von Braun Center (Propst Arena)
Huntsville, AL
Attendance: 3,029
Referees: Anderson, Baker, Brandes

ESPN+

March 12
8:00 p.m. CDT

Box Score

No. 3 Western Kentucky 87, No. 6 Kennesaw State 96
Scoring by half: 41-46, 46-50
Pts: 27 – Moore; Rebs: 7 – Tied (2); Asts: 2 – Tied (4)	Pts: 26 – Simpson; Rebs: 10 – Sherman; Asts: 6 – Johnson
Game 4

Von Braun Center (Propst Arena)
Huntsville, AL
Attendance: 3,029
Referees: Green, Harris, Lenox

=== Semifinal Round ===
CBSSN

March 13
11:30 a.m. CDT

Box Score

No. 4 Louisiana Tech 69, No. 9 Missouri State 66
Scoring by half: 30–27, 39–39
Pts: 27 – Bates; Rebs: 12 – Thomas II; Asts: 6 – Bates	Pts: 19 – Osei-Bonsu; Rebs: 8 – Osei-Bonsu; Asts: 5 – Osei-Bonsu
Game 1

Von Braun Center (Propst Arena)
Huntsville, AL
Attendance: 2,187
Referees: Brandes, Howard, Santos

CBSSN

March 13
2:00 p.m. CDT

Box Score

No. 2 Sam Houston 73, No. 6 Kennesaw State 79
Scoring by half: 37–31, 36–48
Pts: 18 – Coleman; Rebs: 13 – Natt; Asts: 6 – Walker	Pts: 23 – Taylor; Rebs: 7 – Sherman; Asts: 6 – Johnson
Game 2

Von Braun Center (Propst Arena)
Huntsville, AL
Attendance: 2,467
Referees: Baker, Jordan, Wallace

=== Final Round ===
CBSSN

March 14
7:30 p.m. CDT

Box Score

No. 4 Louisiana Tech 60, No. 6 Kennesaw State 71
Scoring by half: 32–35, 28–36
Pts: 10 – Tied (2); Rebs: 10 – Tied (2); Asts: 8 – Bates	Pts: 18 – Harris; Rebs: 8 – Simpson; Asts: 4 – Johnson
Championship

Von Braun Center (Propst Arena)
Huntsville, AL
Attendance: 3,235
Referees: Anderson, Hartness, Santos

== Awards and Honors ==
=== All-Tournament Team ===
Player	Team
A J Bates	Louisiana Tech
R J Johnson (MVP)	Kennesaw State
Michael Osei-Bonsu	Missouri State
Amir Taylor	Kennesaw State
Avery Thomas II	Louisiana Tech

MVP denotes Most Valuable Player

== See also ==
- 2026 Conference USA women's basketball tournament
