= Hank Plona =

American basketball coach

Current position
- Title: Head coach
- Team: Western Kentucky
- Conference: Conference USA
- Record: 35–29 (.547)

Biographical details
- Born: September 30, 1985 (age 41); Avon, Connecticut, U.S.
- Education: Providence ('07)

Coaching career (HC unless noted)
- 2007–2009: Providence (GA)
- 2009–2010: Arkansas–Fort Smith (assistant)
- 2010–2011: Indian Hills CC (assistant)
- 2011–2015: South Plains JC (assistant)
- 2015–2023: Indian Hills CC
- 2023–2024: Western Kentucky (assistant)
- 2024–present: Western Kentucky

Head coaching record
- Overall: 35–29 (.547) (NCAA); 225–35 (.865) (NJCAA)

Hank Plona (born September 30, 1985) is an American basketball coach who is the current head coach at Western Kentucky. He has previously coached at Providence, Arkansas–Fort Smith, Indian Hills Community College and South Plains College.

== Early life ==
Plona grew up in Avon, Connecticut, and graduated from Avon High School in 2003. He then attended Providence College in Rhode Island, where he received a bachelor's degree in 2007 and master's degree two years later.

== Coaching career ==
Plona started his coaching career at Providence, serving from 2007 to 2009 as a student manager and graduate assistant. He then assisted the Arkansas–Fort Smith Lions in the 2009–10 season and followed it up with one year as an assistant in 2010–11 at Indian Hills Community College. Afterwards, Plona assisted at South Plains College from 2011 to 2015, helping them compile an overall record of 116–21 in his tenure which included an undefeated national championship season in 2011–12 and another appearance in the title game in 2014–15.

Plona was hired as the head coach at Indian Hills in 2015. He served eight years there and had an 86.6% winning percentage, helping them win the conference regular season title eight straight times, the conference postseason championship six times and appear in the NJCAA Tournament in all but one of his seasons. He was selected the Iowa Community College Athletic Conference (ICCAC) Coach of the Year four times and was the NJCAA District Coach of the Year five times, with 12 of his players being named All-American, 42 being named All-Region, and 59 ultimately playing at the NCAA Division I level. In all but one week in his entire tenure at Indian Hills, Plona's team was in the national rankings, which included being ranked No. 1 on six different occasions.

Plona resigned from Indian Hills to become an assistant for the Western Kentucky Hilltoppers in 2023, having won 225 games there. After one season as an assistant, he was announced as the team's new head coach on April 2, 2024.

== Head coaching record ==
Record table
Season	Team	Overall	Conference	Standing	Postseason
Indian Hills Community College (Iowa Community College Athletic Conference) (2015–2023)
2015-16	Indian Hills CC	29–5	7–1	1st	NJCAA 1st Round
2016-17	Indian Hills CC	29–5	7–1	1st	NJCAA 1st Round
2017-18	Indian Hills CC	33–1	8–0	1st	NJCAA 1st Round
2018-19	Indian Hills CC	27–7	7–1	1st	NJCAA 2nd Round
2019-20	Indian Hills CC	30–3	7–1	1st	Postseason Cancelled
2020-21	Indian Hills CC	21–3	19–2	1st	District Champions
2021-22	Indian Hills CC	27–6	3–1	1st	NJCAA 1st Round
2022-23	Indian Hills CC	29–5	4–0	1st	NJCAA 3rd Round
Indian Hills CC:		225–35 (.865)	62–7 (.899)		
Western Kentucky Hilltoppers (Conference USA) (2024–present)
2024–25	Western Kentucky	17–15	8–10	7th	
2025–26	Western Kentucky	18–14	11–9	T–3rd	
Western Kentucky:		35–29 (.547)	19–19 (.500)		
Total:		260–64 (.802)			
National champion Postseason invitational champion Conference regular season champion Conference regular season and conference tournament champion Division regular season champion Division regular season and conference tournament champion Conference tournament champion
