= 2025–26 Western Kentucky Hilltoppers basketball team =

American college basketball season

2025–26 Western Kentucky Hilltoppers basketball
- Conference: Conference USA
- Record: 18–14 (11–9 CUSA)
- Head coach: Hank Plona (2nd season)
- Assistant coaches: Martin Cross; Josh Newman; Eric Murphy; Nate Laing; Darryl Jackson
- Home arena: E. A. Diddle Arena

2025–26 Conference USA men's basketball standings
	Conf.				Overall
Team	W		L	PCT	W		L	PCT
Liberty	17	–	3	.850	25	–	7	.781
Sam Houston	13	–	7	.650	22	–	11	.667
Western Kentucky	11	–	9	.550	18	–	14	.563
Louisiana Tech	11	–	9	.550	20	–	14	.588
Middle Tennessee	11	–	9	.550	17	–	15	.531
Kennesaw State †	10	–	10	.500	21	–	13	.618
Jacksonville State	10	–	10	.500	15	–	17	.469
FIU	8	–	12	.400	15	–	17	.469
Missouri State	8	–	12	.400	16	–	18	.471
New Mexico State	8	–	12	.400	16	–	16	.500
UTEP	7	–	13	.350	11	–	20	.355
Delaware	6	–	14	.300	10	–	21	.323
† 2026 CUSA tournament winner As of March 14, 2026

The 2025–26 Western Kentucky Hilltoppers men's basketball team represented Western Kentucky University during the 2025–26 NCAA Division I men's basketball season. The team was led by second-year head coach Hank Plona, and played their home games at E. A. Diddle Arena in Bowling Green, Kentucky as twelfth-year members of Conference USA.

== Previous season ==
The Hilltoppers finished the 2024–25 season 17–15, 8–10 in C-USA play to finish in seventh place. As the No. 7 seed in the C-USA tournament, they were defeated by FIU in the first round.

== Roster ==
2025–26 Western Kentucky Hilltoppers men's basketball team
Players
Coaches

Pos.	#	Name	Height	Weight	Year	Hometown
F	0	Bryant Selebangue	6 ft 8 in (2.03 m)	225 lb (102 kg)	GS	Montreal, Quebec
F/C	1	Blaise Keita	6 ft 11 in (2.11 m)	250 lb (113 kg)	GS	Bamako, Mali
G	2	LJ Hackman	6 ft 3 in (1.91 m)	200 lb (91 kg)	Jr	Columbus, MS
G	3	Cam Haffner	6 ft 2 in (1.88 m)	180 lb (82 kg)	Sr	Westfield, IN
G	4	Ryan Myers	6 ft 1 in (1.85 m)	180 lb (82 kg)	GS	Brooklyn, NY
G	5	Jack Edelen	5 ft 10 in (1.78 m)	172 lb (78 kg)	Jr	Louisville, KY
G	6	Kade Unseld	6 ft 5 in (1.96 m)	202 lb (92 kg)	RS Fr	Bowling Green, KY
F/C	7	Noah Boyde	7 ft 0 in (2.13 m)	245 lb (111 kg)	RS Sr	Monchy, Saint Lucia
F	8	Grant Newell	6 ft 9 in (2.06 m)	220 lb (100 kg)	Sr	Chicago, IL
G	10	Cade Stinnett	6 ft 3 in (1.91 m)	198 lb (90 kg)	RS Jr	Bowling Green, KY
G	11	Terrion Murdix	6 ft 1 in (1.85 m)	170 lb (77 kg)	GS	Springfield, IL
G	12	Armelo Boone	6 ft 4 in (1.93 m)	175 lb (79 kg)	Fr	Lexington, KY
F/C	21	Leeroy Odiahi	6 ft 11 in (2.11 m)	218 lb (99 kg)	GS	Tralee, Ireland
G	24	Lawson Rice	6 ft 6 in (1.98 m)	195 lb (88 kg)	Fr	Morgantown, KY
G	30	Teagan Moore	6 ft 5 in (1.96 m)	220 lb (100 kg)	RS So	Dry Ridge, KY
F	33	Louie Semona	6 ft 8 in (2.03 m)	205 lb (93 kg)	Jr	Cincinnati, OH

Head coach

- Hank Plona (Providence)

Assistant coach(es)

- Martin Cross (Western Kentucky)
- Josh Newman (Arizona State)
- Eric Murphy (Slippery Rock)
- Nate Laing (UCF)
- Darryl Jackson (Valparaiso)

Legend

- (C) Team captain
- (S) Suspended
- (I) Ineligible
- (W) Walk-on
- Injured
- Current redshirt

Roster
Last update: December 5, 2025

== Schedule and results ==
Date time, TV	Rank^{#}	Opponent^{#}	Result	Record	High points	High rebounds	High assists	Site (attendance) city, state
Exhibition
October 22, 2025*; 6:30 p.m.		Kentucky Wesleyan	W 82–43	–	11 – Moore	8 – Boone	3 – Tied	E. A. Diddle Arena (3,171); Bowling Green, KY
October 29, 2025*; 6:30 p.m.		at UAB	W 78–76	–	26 – Moore	9 – Selebangue	2 – Moore	Bartow Arena (2,012); Birmingham, AL
Non-conference regular season
November 3, 2025*; 6:30 p.m., ESPN+		Tennessee Tech	W 82–70	1–0	16 – Tied	10 – Selebangue	2 – Tied	E. A. Diddle Arena (3,247); Bowling Green, KY
November 10, 2025*; 6:00 p.m., ESPN+		at Eastern Kentucky	W 87–79	2–0	22 – Moore	6 – Tied	5 – Boone	Baptist Health Arena (4,021); Richmond, KY
November 16, 2025*; 2:00 p.m., ESPN+		Tennessee State	W 95–82	3–0	20 – Moore	7 – Newell	7 – Murdix	E. A. Diddle Arena (2,845); Bowling Green, KY
November 18, 2025*; 6:30 p.m., ESPN+		Bethel	W 97–67	4–0	16 – Newell	8 – Murdix	5 – Moore	E. A. Diddle Arena (2,523); Bowling Green, KY
November 26, 2025*; 11:00 a.m., ESPN		vs. No. 24 Vanderbilt; Battle 4 Atlantis Quarterfinals	L 78–83	4–1	24 – Moore	9 – Selebangue	5 – Moore	Imperial Arena (437); Nassau, Bahamas
November 27, 2025*; 4:30 p.m., ESPN2		vs. South Florida; Battle 4 Atlantis Consolation Semifinals	L 91–97 ^{OT}	4–2	27 – Moore	12 – Selebangue	5 – Moore	Imperial Arena (393); Nassau, Bahamas
November 28, 2025*; 6:00 p.m., ESPNU		vs. Wichita State; Battle 4 Atlantis 7th Place Game	W 75–70	5–2	22 – Boone	6 – Moore	3 – Boone	Imperial Arena (1,061); Nassau, Bahamas
December 6, 2025*; 3:00 p.m., ESPN+		Evansville	W 80–79	6–2	27 – Myers	12 – Selebangue	4 – Tied	E. A. Diddle Arena (3,247); Bowling Green, KY
December 10, 2025*; 6:00 p.m., ESPN+		at Marshall	L 61–77	6–3	11 – Myers	6 – Boone	4 – Edelen	Cam Henderson Center (4,420); Huntington, WV
December 15, 2025*; 6:30 p.m., ESPN+		Campbellsville	W 102–59	7–3	19 – Myers	8 – Tied	6 – Hackman	E. A. Diddle Arena (2,545); Bowling Green, KY
December 19, 2025*; 6:30 p.m., ESPN+		Tulsa	L 81–82	7–4	28 – Newell	12 – Boone	6 – Moore	E. A. Diddle Arena (3,547); Bowling Green, KY
Conference regular season
December 29, 2025; 6:00 p.m., ESPN+		at Jacksonville State	L 67–78	7–5 (0–1)	18 – Boone	6 – Tied	4 – Newell	Pete Mathews Coliseum (1,755); Jacksonville, AL
January 2, 2026; 4:00 p.m., ESPN+		Sam Houston	W 102–91	8–5 (1–1)	28 – Moore	13 – Boone	3 – Tied	E. A. Diddle Arena (3,645); Bowling Green, KY
January 4, 2026; 2:00 p.m., ESPN+		Louisiana Tech	W 66–61	9–5 (2–1)	19 – Moore	9 – Moore	4 – Moore	E. A. Diddle Arena (3,523); Bowling Green, KY
January 8, 2026; 8:00 p.m., ESPN+		at New Mexico State	L 64–80	9–6 (2–2)	13 – Boone	9 – Boone	4 – Murdix	Pan American Center (2,612); Las Cruces, NM
January 10, 2026; 3:00 p.m., ESPN+		at UTEP	W 68–56	10–6 (3–2)	19 – Moore	14 – Boone	2 – Tied	Don Haskins Center (4,392); El Paso, TX
January 14, 2026; 6:00 p.m., ESPN+		Missouri State	W 87–72	11–6 (4–2)	20 – Moore	7 – Newell	6 – Murdix	E. A. Diddle Arena (2,745); Bowling Green, KY
January 17, 2026; 2:00 p.m., ESPN+		Kennesaw State	L 65–81	11–7 (4–3)	16 – Myers	8 – Moore	3 – Myers	E. A. Diddle Arena (3,823); Bowling Green, KY
January 21, 2026; 6:30 p.m., ESPN+		Liberty	L 69–76	11–8 (4–4)	19 – Moore	13 – Boone	4 – Murdix	E. A. Diddle Arena (3,512); Bowling Green, KY
January 24, 2026; 2:30 p.m., ESPN+		at Sam Houston	L 58–73	11–9 (4–5)	14 – Hackman	6 – Newell	4 – Edelen	Bernard Johnson Coliseum (1,026); Huntsville, TX
January 28, 2026; 6:00 p.m., ESPN+		at Kennesaw State	L 69–72	11–10 (4–6)	15 – Newell	8 – Keita	4 – Murdix	Convocation Center (1,636); Kennesaw, GA
January 31, 2026; 3:00 p.m., CBSSN		at Middle Tennessee	W 65–60	12–10 (5–6)	17 – Unseld	14 – Keita	7 – Murdix	Murphy Center (4,127); Murfreesboro, TN
February 5, 2026; 8:00 p.m., CBSSN		Jacksonville State	L 66–71	12–11 (5–7)	20 – Myers	7 – Keita	3 – Boone	E. A. Diddle Arena (3,247); Bowling Green, KY
February 7, 2026; 2:00 p.m., ESPN+		FIU	W 80–70	13–11 (6–7)	23 – Newell	10 – Keita	6 – Murdix	E. A. Diddle Arena (3,145); Bowling Green, KY
February 14, 2026; 7:00 p.m., ESPN+		Middle Tennessee	W 82–80	14–11 (7–7)	28 – Moore	7 – Newell	7 – Murdix	E. A. Diddle Arena (4,023); Bowling Green, KY
February 18, 2026; 6:00 p.m., ESPN+		at Delaware	W 88–87 ^{OT}	15–11 (8–7)	27 – Moore	8 – Keita	8 – Murdix	Bob Carpenter Center (2,250); Newark, DE
February 21, 2026; 3:00 p.m., ESPN+		at Liberty	W 94–73	16–11 (9–7)	21 – Tied	8 – Newell	5 – Murdix	Liberty Arena (3,922); Lynchburg, VA
February 26, 2026; 6:30 p.m., ESPN+		New Mexico State	W 93–70	17–11 (10–7)	23 – Moore	10 – Hackman	7 – Murdix	E. A. Diddle Arena (3,847); Bowling Green, KY
February 28, 2026; 2:00 p.m., ESPN+		UTEP	W 97–65	18–11 (11–7)	25 – Newell	7 – Newell	9 – Murdix	E. A. Diddle Arena (4,547); Bowling Green, KY
March 5, 2026; 7:00 p.m., ESPN+		at Missouri State	L 74–87	18–12 (11–8)	23 – Moore	6 – Hackman	2 – Murdix	Great Southern Bank Arena (2,159); Springfield, MO
March 7, 2026; 1:00 p.m., ESPN+		at FIU	L 67–92	18–13 (11–9)	17 – Newell	8 – Boone	5 – Murdix	Ocean Bank Convocation Center (804); Miami, FL
Conference USA Tournament
March 12, 2026; 8:00 p.m., ESPN+	(3)	vs. (6) Kennesaw State; Quarterfinal	L 87–96	18–14	27 – Moore	7 – Tied	2 – Tied	Propst Arena (3,029); Huntsville, AL
*Non-conference game. ^{#}Rankings from AP poll. (#) Tournament seedings in parentheses. All times are in Central.
