= 2025–26 New Mexico State Aggies men's basketball team =

American college basketball season

2025–26 New Mexico State Aggies men's basketball
- Conference: Conference USA
- Record: 16–16 (8–12 CUSA)
- Head coach: Jason Hooten (3rd season)
- Assistant coaches: Preston Laird (2nd season); Terryonte Thomas (3rd season); Nick Matson (1st season); Shunn Buchanan (2nd season)
- Home arena: Pan American Center (Capacity: 12,482)

2025–26 Conference USA men's basketball standings
| | Conf. | | | | Overall |
| Team | W | | L | PCT | W | | L | PCT |
|---|---|---|---|---|---|---|---|---|
| Liberty | 17 | – | 3 | .850 | 25 | – | 7 | .781 |
| Sam Houston | 13 | – | 7 | .650 | 22 | – | 10 | .688 |
| Western Kentucky | 11 | – | 9 | .550 | 18 | – | 13 | .581 |
| Louisiana Tech | 11 | – | 9 | .550 | 18 | – | 13 | .581 |
| Middle Tennessee | 11 | – | 9 | .550 | 17 | – | 14 | .548 |
| Kennesaw State | 10 | – | 10 | .500 | 18 | – | 13 | .581 |
| Jacksonville State | 10 | – | 10 | .500 | 15 | – | 17 | .469 |
| FIU | 8 | – | 12 | .400 | 15 | – | 17 | .469 |
| Missouri State | 8 | – | 12 | .400 | 16 | – | 17 | .485 |
| New Mexico State | 8 | – | 12 | .400 | 16 | – | 16 | .500 |
| UTEP | 7 | – | 13 | .350 | 11 | – | 20 | .355 |
| Delaware | 6 | – | 14 | .300 | 10 | – | 21 | .323 |
† 2026 CUSA tournament winner As of March 11, 2026

The 2025–26 New Mexico State Aggies men's basketball team represented New Mexico State University during the 2025–26 NCAA Division I men's basketball season. The Aggies, led by third-year head coach Jason Hooten, played their home games at Pan American Center in Las Cruces, New Mexico as a member of Conference USA.

== Previous season ==
The New Mexico State finished the 2025–26 season 17–15, 10–8 in Conference USA to finish tied for fourth in the conference. As the 5-seed in the Conference USA Tournament they were defeated by 4-seed Kennesaw State 80–77 in the Quarterfinals to end their season.

== Offseason ==
=== Departures ===
| Name | Number | Pos. | Height | Weight | Year | Hometown | Reason for departure |
|---|---|---|---|---|---|---|---|
| Dionte Bostick | 0 | G | 6'2" | 185 | Senior | Clearwater, FL | Out of eligibility |
| Zawdie Jackson | 2 | G | 6'0" | 185 | Senior | Stone Mountain, GA | Transferred to FIU |
| Christian Cook | 3 | G | 6'2" | 175 | Senior | Oklahoma City, OK | Out of eligibility |
| Carl Cherenfant | 5 | G | 6'5" | 195 | Sophomore | Pompano Beach, FL | Transferred to McNeese |
| Christopher Biekeu | 6 | F | 6'7" | 235 | Graduate | Montreal, QC, Canada | Out of eligibility |
| Marvin Cox | 10 | F | 6'7" | 170 | Freshman | Clovis, NM | Entered transfer portal |
| Peter Filipovity | 12 | F | 6'7" | - | Graduate | Kaposvár, Hungary | Out of eligibility |
| Jaden Harris | 13 | G | 6'4" | 190 | Senior | Atlanta, GA | Transferred to Kennesaw State |
| Nate Tshimanga | 19 | F | 6'10" | 235 | Senior | Montreal, QC, Canada | Out of eligibility |
| Azavier Johnson | 20 | G | 6'5" | 202 | Junior | Las Vegas, NV | Entered transfer portal |
| Robert Carpenter | 21 | F | 6'7" | 210 | Graduate | Detroit, MI | Out of eligibility |
| Emmanuel Tshimanga | 25 | F | 7'0" | 270 | Graduate | Montreal, QC, Canada | Out of eligibility |
| Edward Nnamoko | 34 | F | 6'10" | 225 | Junior | Lagos, Nigeria | Entered transfer portal |

=== Incoming transfers ===
| Name | Number | Pos. | Height | Weight | Year | Hometown | Previous college |
|---|---|---|---|---|---|---|---|
| Julius Mims | 0 | G | 6'9" | - | Graduate | Billings, MT | Idaho |
| Kyrese Mullen | 3 | G | 6'7" | - | Senior | Norfolk, VA | Hampton |
| Chris Terrell | 5 | C | 6'0" | - | Senior | Horn Lake, MS | Delta State |
| Jayland Randall | 8 | G | 6'5" | - | Senior | Detroit, MI | Southern Indiana |
| Anthony Wrzeszcz | 9 | F | 6'4" | - | Senior | Gdynia, Poland | McMaster |
| Elijah Elliott | 11 | F | 6'1" | - | Graduate | Houston, TX | Southern Illinois |
| Christian Villegas | 12 | C | 6'2" | - | Senior | El Paso, TX | Texas A&M–Corpus Christi |
| Amarco Doyle | 20 | C | 6'7" | - | Sophomore | Queensland, Australia | Southern Idaho |
| Jemel Jones | 21 | C | 6'4" | - | Senior | Chicago, IL | Cal State Bakersfield |
| Cyr Malonga | 24 | C | 6'11" | - | Junior | Pointe-Noire, Republic of the Congo | East Carolina |

=== 2025 recruiting class ===
College recruiting information
| Name | Hometown | School | Height | Weight | Commit date |
|---|---|---|---|---|---|
| Augustine Ekwe; C | Mount Pleasant, UT | Wasatch Academy | 6 ft 10 in (2.08 m) | 240 lb (110 kg) | Nov 13, 2024 |
| Augustine Ekwe; C | Recruit ratings: Rivals: ESPN: (NR) | | | | |
| Omarr Smith; SG | Baltimore, MD | Baltimore City College | 6 ft 4 in (1.93 m) | 160 lb (73 kg) | Nov 13, 2024 |
| Omarr Smith; SG | Recruit ratings: 247Sports: ESPN: (79) | | | | |
Overall recruit ranking: Scout: – Rivals: –
Note: In many cases, Scout, Rivals, 247Sports, On3, and ESPN may conflict in their listings of height and weight.; In these cases, the average was taken. ESPN grades are on a 100-point scale.; Sources: "2025 New Mexico State Basketball Recruiting Commits". Scout.; "Scout.com Team Recruiting Rankings". Scout.; "2025 Team Ranking". Rivals.

== Roster ==
2025–26 New Mexico State Aggies men's basketball team
Players
Coaches

| Pos. | # | Name | Height | Weight | Year | Previous school | Hometown |
|---|---|---|---|---|---|---|---|
| F | 0 | Julius Mims | 6 ft 9 in (2.06 m) | — | GS | Idaho | Billings, Montana |
| G | 1 | Gabe Pickens | 6 ft 0 in (1.83 m) | — | So | Dream City Christian | Phoenix, Arizona |
| G | 2 | Omarr Smith | 6 ft 4 in (1.93 m) | — | Fr | Baltimore City College | Baltimore, Maryland |
| F | 3 | Kyrese Mullen | 6 ft 7 in (2.01 m) | — | Sr | Hampton | Norfolk, Virginia |
| F | 4 | Jae'Coby Osborne | 6 ft 6 in (1.98 m) | — | So | Bella Vista Prep | Missouri City, Texas |
| G | 5 | Chris Terrell | 6 ft 0 in (1.83 m) | — | Sr | Delta State | Horn Lake, Mississippi |
| G | 8 | Jayland Randall | 6 ft 5 in (1.96 m) | — | Sr | Southern Indiana | Detroit, Michigan |
| G | 9 | Anthony Wrzeszcz | 6 ft 4 in (1.93 m) | — | Sr | McMaster | Gdynia, Poland |
| G | 11 | Elijah Elliott | 6 ft 1 in (1.85 m) | — | GS | Southern Illinois | Houston, TX |
| G | 12 | Christian Villegas | 6 ft 2 in (1.88 m) | — | Sr | Texas A&M-Corpus Christi | El Paso, Texas |
| F | 20 | Amarco Doyle | 6 ft 7 in (2.01 m) | — | So | Southern Idaho | Queensland, Australia |
| G | 21 | Jemel Jones | 6 ft 4 in (1.93 m) | — | Sr | Cal State Bakersfield | Chicago, Illinois |
| C | 24 | Cyr Malonga | 6 ft 11 in (2.11 m) | — | Jr | East Carolina | Pointe-Noire, Republic of the Congo |
| C | 44 | Augustine Ekwe | 6 ft 9 in (2.06 m) | — | Fr | Wasatch Academy | Lagos, Nigeria |

Head coach

- Jason Hooten (Tarleton State)

Assistant coach(es)

- Preston Laird (Memphis)
- Terryonte Thomas (Sam Houston State)
- Nick Matson (VMI)
- Shunn Buchanan (New Mexico State)

Legend

- (C) Team captain
- (S) Suspended
- (I) Ineligible
- (W) Walk-on
- Injured
- Current redshirt

Roster
Last update: 2025-10-28

== Schedule and results ==
| Date time, TV | Rank^{#} | Opponent^{#} | Result | Record | High points | High rebounds | High assists | Site (attendance) city, state |
Non-Conference Regular Season
| November 4, 2025*; 7:00 p.m., ESPN+ | | Adams State | W 83–72 | 1–0 | 23 – Jones | 9 – Jones | 5 – Pickens | Pan American Center (4,683); Las Cruces, NM |
| November 11, 2025*; 7:30 p.m., ESPN+ | | New Mexico Highlands | W 74–58 | 2–0 | 24 – Jones | 6 – Ekwe | 3 – Tied | Pan American Center (3,856); Las Cruces, NM |
| November 15, 2025*; 7:00 p.m., ESPN+ | | New Mexico; Rio Grande Rivalry | W 76–68 | 3–0 | 16 – Wrzeszcz | 8 – Mims | 4 – Elliott | Pan American Center (8,106); Las Cruces, NM |
| November 21, 2025*; 7:00 p.m., ESPN+ | | Samford; Cancún Challenge campus-site game | W 81–72 | 4–0 | 17 – Mims | 11 – Mims | 8 – Pickens | Pan American Center (4,484); Las Cruces, NM |
| November 25, 2025*; 6:30 p.m., FloHoops | | vs. UC Irvine; Cancún Challenge | W 57–45 | 5–0 | 12 – Jones | 8 – Tied | 2 – Pickens | Hard Rock Hotel Riviera Maya; Cancún, QR, Mexico |
| November 26, 2025*; 1:00 p.m., FloCollege | | vs. Georgia State; Cancún Challenge | W 77–58 | 6–0 | 12 – Jones | 11 – Mims | 3 – Tied | Hard Rock Hotel Riviera Maya; Cancún, QR, Mexico |
| December 2, 2025*; 5:00 p.m., TBD | | vs. South Alabama | L 75–77 | 6–1 | 21 – Randall | 9 – Jones | 4 – Tied | Merrell Center (195); Katy, TX |
| December 6, 2025*; 2:00 p.m., ESPN+ | | at Abilene Christian | L 69–77 | 6–2 | 19 – Jones | 4 – Tied | 4 – Terrell | Moody Coliseum (923); Abilene, TX |
| December 13, 2025*; 1:00 p.m., Urban Edge Network | | vs. Tulsa | L 70–83 | 6–3 | 16 – Mims | 5 – Tied | 4 – Tied | Comerica Center (1,342); Frisco, TX |
| December 28, 2025*; 2:00 p.m., ESPN+ | | University of the Southwest | W 104–33 | 8–3 | 19 – Jones | 11 – Osborne | 9 – Tied | Pan American Center (3,741); Las Cruces, NM |
Conference USA Regular Season
| December 21, 2025; 2:00 p.m., ESPN+ | | Sam Houston | W 87–78 | 7–3 (1–0) | 18 – Elliott | 9 – Mims | 3 – Terrell | Pan American Center (4,125); Las Cruces, NM |
| January 2, 2026; 10:00 a.m., ESPN+ | | at FIU | L 74–89 | 8–4 (1–1) | 15 – Wrzeszcz | 4 – Terrell | 3 – Tied | Ocean Bank Convocation Center (431); Miami, FL |
| January 4, 2026; 1:00 p.m., ESPN+ | | at Missouri State | L 82–89 | 8–5 (1–2) | 22 – Mims | 14 – Mims | 3 – Tied | Great Southern Bank Arena (2,075); Springfield, MO |
| January 8, 2026; 7:00 p.m., ESPN+ | | Western Kentucky | W 80–64 | 9–5 (2–2) | 24 – Jones | 15 – Mims | 6 – Pickens | Pan American Center (3,603); Las Cruces, NM |
| January 10, 2026; 6:00 p.m., ESPNU | | Middle Tennessee | L 55–59 | 9–6 (2–3) | 16 – Jones | 7 – Mims | 3 – Tied | Pan American Center (4,047); Las Cruces, NM |
| January 15, 2026; 4:00 p.m., CBSSN | | at Liberty | L 71–73 | 9–7 (2–4) | 16 – Wrzeszcz | 12 – Osborne | 5 – Terrell | Liberty Arena (2,580); Lynchburg, VA |
| January 17, 2026; 12:00 p.m., ESPN+ | | at Delaware | W 97–64 | 10–7 (3–4) | 19 – Jones | 10 – Mims | 5 – Jones | Bob Carpenter Center (2,560); Newark, DE |
| January 22, 2026; 7:00 p.m., CBSSN | | Missouri State | L 75–84 | 10–8 (3–5) | 28 – Jones | 8 – Mims | 7 – Elliott | Pan American Center (5,664); Las Cruces, NM |
| January 24, 2026; 12:00 p.m., ESPN+ | | FIU | L 78–81 | 10–9 (3–6) | 26 – Elliott | 13 – Mims | 5 – Jones | Pan American Center (5,682); Las Cruces, NM |
| January 28, 2026; 7:00 p.m., ESPN+ | | Delaware | L 64–73 | 10–10 (3–7) | 20 – Wrzeszcz | 9 – Mims | 4 – Pickens | Pan American Center (5,538); Las Cruces, NM |
| January 31, 2026; 3:00 p.m., ESPN+ | | at Kennesaw State | L 53–76 | 10–11 (3–8) | 13 – Jones | 10 – Mims | 2 – Tied | Convocation Center (1,377); Kennesaw, GA |
| February 4, 2026; 5:30 p.m., ESPN+ | | at Louisiana Tech | W 72–63 | 11–11 (4–8) | 26 – Jones | 12 – Mims | 5 – Jones | Thomas Assembly Center (2,127); Ruston, LA |
| February 7, 2026; 7:00 p.m., ESPN+ | | at UTEP; Battle of I-10 | L 88–91 | 11–12 (4–9) | 26 – Jones | 12 – Mims | 4 – Tied | Don Haskins Center (7,862); El Paso, TX |
| February 11, 2026; 7:00 p.m., ESPN+ | | Liberty | L 75–77 | 11–13 (4–10) | 23 – Jones | 13 – Mims | 6 – Terrell | Pan American Center (5,236); Las Cruces, NM |
| February 14, 2026; 3:00 p.m., ESPN+ | | at Jacksonville State | W 79–70 | 12–13 (5–10) | 20 – Randall | 17 – Mims | 4 – Elliott | Pete Mathews Coliseum (894); Jacksonville, AL |
| February 21, 2026; 7:00 p.m., ESPN+ | | UTEP; Battle of I-10 | W 67–63 | 13–13 (6–10) | 21 – Jones | 9 – Osborne | 5 – Pickens | Pan American Center (7,606); Las Cruces, NM |
| February 26, 2026; 5:30 p.m., ESPN+ | | at Western Kentucky | L 70–93 | 13–14 (6–11) | 13 – Mims | 10 – Mims | 5 – Pickens | E.A. Diddle Arena (3,847); Bowling Green, KY |
| February 28, 2026; 11:00 a.m., ESPN+ | | at Middle Tennessee | L 85–86 ^{OT} | 13–15 (6–12) | 34 – Jones | 7 – Tied | 3 – Pickens | Murphy Center (3,121); Murfreesboro, TN |
| March 5, 2026; 7:00 p.m., ESPN+ | | Jacksonville State | W 77–75 ^{OT} | 14–15 (7–12) | 29 – Jones | 7 – Mims | 5 – Jones | Pan American Center (6,648); Las Cruces, NM |
| March 7, 2026; 2:00 p.m., ESPN+ | | Kennesaw State | W 79–76 | 15–15 (8–12) | 19 – Jones | 12 – Jones | 8 – Pickens | Pan American Center (5,375); Las Cruces, NM |
Conference USA Tournament
| March 10, 2026; 7:00 p.m., ESPN+ | (10) | vs. (7) Jacksonville State; First Round | W 68–63 | 16–15 | 17 – Jones | 5 – Tied | 3 – Jones | Propst Arena (3,207); Huntsville, AL |
| March 11, 2026; 7:00 p.m., ESPN+ | (10) | vs. (2) Sam Houston; Quarterfinals | L 61–69 | 16–16 | 19 – Jones | 9 – Mullen | 2 – Tied | Propst Arena (2,220); Huntsville, AL |
*Non-conference game. ^{#}Rankings from AP Poll. (#) Tournament seedings in parentheses. All times are in Mountain Time.
