= 2025–26 Sam Houston Bearkats men's basketball team =

American college basketball season

2025–26 Sam Houston Bearkats men's basketball
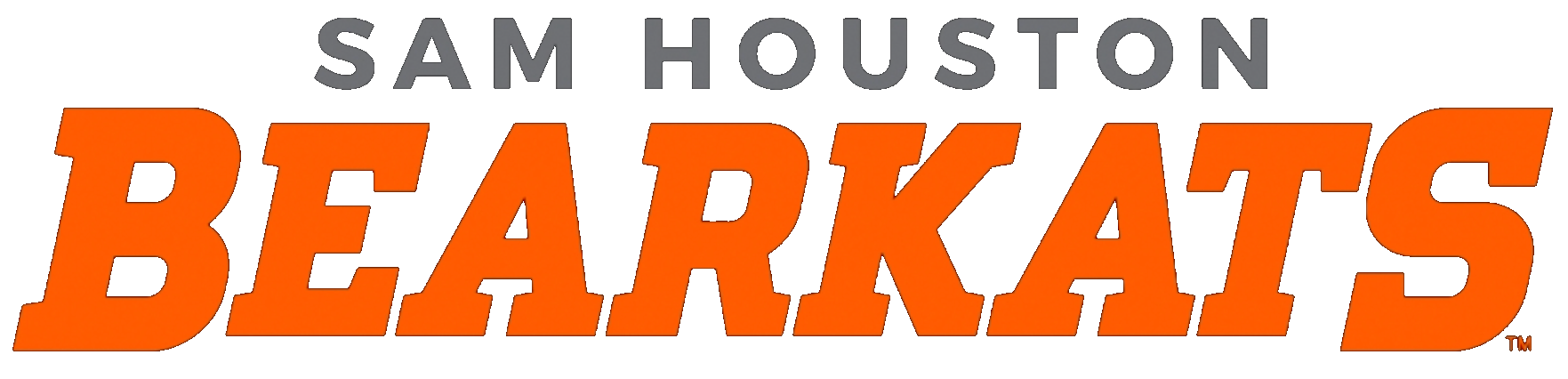

NIT, First round
- Conference: Conference USA
- Record: 22–12 (13–7 CUSA)
- Head coach: Chris Mudge (3rd season)
- Assistant coaches: Anthony Fobb (3rd season); Angres Thorpe (1st season); Jake White (3rd season); Joe Kuligoski (1st season); Luke Pluymen (1st season)
- Home arena: Bernard Johnson Coliseum

2025–26 Conference USA men's basketball standings
| | Conf. | | | | Overall |
| Team | W | | L | PCT | W | | L | PCT |
|---|---|---|---|---|---|---|---|---|
| Liberty | 17 | – | 3 | .850 | 26 | – | 7 | .788 |
| Sam Houston | 13 | – | 7 | .650 | 22 | – | 12 | .647 |
| Western Kentucky | 11 | – | 9 | .550 | 18 | – | 14 | .563 |
| Louisiana Tech | 11 | – | 9 | .550 | 20 | – | 14 | .588 |
| Middle Tennessee | 11 | – | 9 | .550 | 17 | – | 15 | .531 |
| Kennesaw State † | 10 | – | 10 | .500 | 21 | – | 13 | .618 |
| Jacksonville State | 10 | – | 10 | .500 | 15 | – | 17 | .469 |
| FIU | 8 | – | 12 | .400 | 15 | – | 17 | .469 |
| Missouri State | 8 | – | 12 | .400 | 16 | – | 18 | .471 |
| New Mexico State | 8 | – | 12 | .400 | 16 | – | 16 | .500 |
| UTEP | 7 | – | 13 | .350 | 11 | – | 20 | .355 |
| Delaware | 6 | – | 14 | .300 | 10 | – | 21 | .323 |
† 2026 CUSA tournament winner As of March 18, 2026

The 2025–26 Sam Houston Bearkats men's basketball team represented Sam Houston State University during the 2025–26 NCAA Division I men's basketball season. The Bearkats, led by third-year head coach Chris Mudge, played their home games at the Bernard Johnson Coliseum in Huntsville, Texas as third-year members of the Conference USA.

== Previous season ==
The Bearkats finished the 2024–25 season 13–19, 6–12 in CUSA play, to finish in ninth place. They were defeated by UTEP in the first round of the CUSA tournament.

== Preseason ==
On October 9, 2025, Conference USA released their preseason poll. Sam Houston was picked to finish ninth in the conference.

=== Preseason rankings ===
CUSA Preseason Poll
| Place | Team | Votes |
|---|---|---|
| 1 | Liberty | 143 (11) |
| 2 | Kennesaw State | 126 (1) |
| 3 | New Mexico State | 113 |
| 4 | Middle Tennessee | 103 |
| 5 | Louisiana Tech | 82 |
| 6 | Western Kentucky | 79 |
| 7 | Jacksonville State | 67 |
| 8 | UTEP | 66 |
| 9 | Sam Houston | 56 |
| 10 | FIU | 36 |
| 11 | Delaware | 35 |
| 12 | Missouri State | 30 |
(#) first-place votes

=== Preseason All-CUSA Team ===
No players were named to the Preseason All-CUSA Team.

== Roster ==
2025–26 Sam Houston Bearkats men's basketball team
Players
Coaches

| Pos. | # | Name | Height | Weight | Year | Previous school | Hometown |
|---|---|---|---|---|---|---|---|
| G | 0 | Noah Benny | 6 ft 0 in (1.83 m) | 170 lb (77 kg) | Fr | Fort Bend Christian Academy | Sugar Land, Texas |
| G | 1 | CJ Beaumont | 6 ft 8 in (2.03 m) | 210 lb (95 kg) | Jr | Palm Beach Prep | West Palm Beach, Florida |
| G | 2 | Jacobe Coleman | 6 ft 3 in (1.91 m) | 200 lb (91 kg) | Fr | Dynamic Prep | Fort Smith, Arkansas |
| G | 4 | Kashie Natt | 6 ft 3 in (1.91 m) | 190 lb (86 kg) | GS | LSU–Alexandria | Rayville, Louisiana |
| G | 5 | Justin Begg | 6 ft 0 in (1.83 m) | 185 lb (84 kg) | So | George Mason | Houston, Texas |
| F | 8 | Veljko Ilic | 6 ft 10 in (2.08 m) | 240 lb (109 kg) | GS | Loyola (MD) | Gornji Milanovac, Serbia |
| F | 10 | Jaxson Ford | 6 ft 7 in (2.01 m) | 215 lb (98 kg) | So | Link Academy | Prosper, Texas |
| G | 11 | Nathan Nguyen | 6 ft 0 in (1.83 m) | 160 lb (73 kg) | Fr | St. Thomas' Episcopal School | Houston, Texas |
| F | 12 | Matt Dann | 7 ft 0 in (2.13 m) | 235 lb (107 kg) | Fr | Fort Erie International Academy | Oakville, Ontario |
| F | 13 | Isaiah Manning | 6 ft 8 in (2.03 m) | 225 lb (102 kg) | So | TCU | Mansfield, Texas |
| G | 22 | Jackson Rogers (W) | 6 ft 3 in (1.91 m) | 205 lb (93 kg) | So | Wylie High School | Murphy, Texas |
| F | 23 | Cheikh Ndiaye | 6 ft 10 in (2.08 m) | 215 lb (98 kg) | So | Prestige Sports Academy | Louga, Senegal |
| G | 25 | Damon Nicholas Jr. | 6 ft 4 in (1.93 m) | 195 lb (88 kg) | GS | Duncanville High School | Duncanville, Texas |
| G | 35 | Po'Boigh King | 6 ft 5 in (1.96 m) | 200 lb (91 kg) | Sr | North Carolina Central | Roanoke Rapids, North Carolina |
| G | 55 | Jacob Walker | 6 ft 1 in (1.85 m) | 185 lb (84 kg) | Fr | Sunrise Christian Academy | Memphis, Tennessee |

Head coach

- Chris Mudge (Texas)

Assistant coach(es)

- Anthony Fobb (Southeastern Louisiana)
- Angres Thorpe (Saint Leo)
- Jake White (UT Tyler)
- Joe Kuligoski (Eastern Illinois)
- Luke Pluymen (Sul Ross State)

Legend

- (C) Team captain
- (S) Suspended
- (I) Ineligible
- (W) Walk-on
- Injured
- Current redshirt

Roster
Last update: December 6, 2025

== Schedule and results ==
| Date time, TV | Rank^{#} | Opponent^{#} | Result | Record | High points | High rebounds | High assists | Site (attendance) city, state |
Non-Conference Regular Season
| November 3, 2025*; 6:30 pm, ESPN+ | | LeTourneau | W 95–59 | 1–0 | 17 – Coleman | 11 – Natt | 5 – Walker | Bernard Johnson Coliseum (1,488); Huntsville, TX |
| November 7, 2025*; 7:00 pm, ESPN+ | | at No. 10 Texas Tech | L 77–98 | 1–1 | 17 – Begg | 11 – Natt | 5 – Begg | United Supermarkets Arena (13,440); Lubbock, TX |
| November 15, 2025*; 8:00 pm, ESPN+ | | at Utah | L 79–85 | 1–2 | 17 – Coleman | 5 – Tied | 2 – Tied | Jon M. Huntsman Center (6,299); Salt Lake City, UT |
| November 19, 2025*; 6:30 pm, ESPN+ | | Wyoming | W 78−70 | 2−2 | 18 – Ilic | 14 – Nicholas Jr. | 3 – Begg | Bernard Johnson Coliseum (1,551); Huntsville, TX |
| November 22, 2025*; 2:30 pm, ESPN+ | | Schreiner | W 105−54 | 3−2 | 16 – Nicholas Jr. | 11 – Ford | 7 – Begg | Bernard Johnson Coliseum (965); Huntsville, TX |
| November 26, 2025*; 5:30 pm, ESPN+ | | vs. Idaho State; Holiday Hoops Classic | W 84–81 | 4–2 | 26 – Natt | 12 – Ilic | 5 – Begg | Idaho Central Arena; Boise, ID |
| November 28, 2025*; 8:00 pm, ESPN+ | | vs. Idaho; Holiday Hoops Classic | W 94–68 | 5–2 | 18 – Manning | 11 – Natt | 7 – Begg | Idaho Central Arena; Boise, ID |
| December 2, 2025*; 7:00 pm, ESPN+ | | at Oklahoma State | L 83–93 | 5–3 | 20 – King | 6 – Tied | 5 – Begg | Gallagher-Iba Arena (5,906); Stillwater, OK |
| December 6, 2025*; 4:00 pm, YouTube | | at Texas Southern | W 82–70 | 6–3 | 22 – Natt | 7 – Ford | 4 – Ilic | H&PE Arena (567); Houston, TX |
| December 17, 2025*; 8:30 pm, ESPN+ | | at Oregon State | W 85–75 | 7–3 | 19 – Natt | 12 – Ilic | 6 – Begg | Gill Coliseum (2,011); Corvallis, OR |
| December 28, 2025*; 2:30 pm, ESPN+ | | Biblical Studies | W 117–57 | 8–4 | 27 – Manning | 15 – Dann | 6 – Coleman | Bernard Johnson Coliseum (210); Huntsville, TX |
Conference USA Regular Season
| December 21, 2025; 1:00 pm, ESPN+ | | at New Mexico State | L 78–87 | 7–4 (0–1) | 20 – Begg | 10 – Natt | 3 – Coleman | Pan American Center (4,125); Las Cruces, NM |
| January 2, 2026; 4:00 pm, ESPN+ | | at Western Kentucky | L 91–102 | 8–5 (0–2) | 23 – Manning | 12 – Ilic | 3 – Tied | E. A. Diddle Arena (3,645); Bowling Green, KY |
| January 4, 2026; 1:00 pm, ESPN+ | | at Middle Tennessee | L 67–68 | 8–6 (0–3) | 16 – Ilic | 13 – Ilic | 3 – Tied | Murphy Center (3,212); Murfreesboro, TN |
| January 8, 2026; 6:30 pm, ESPN+ | | Delaware | W 72–60 | 9–6 (1–3) | 22 – King | 13 – Ilic | 5 – Walker | Bernard Johnson Coliseum (875); Huntsville, TX |
| January 10, 2026; 2:30 pm, ESPN+ | | Liberty | L 74–82 | 9–7 (1–4) | 20 – Natt | 8 – Tied | 6 – Begg | Bernard Johnson Coliseum (1,170); Huntsville, TX |
| January 14, 2026; 6:00 pm, ESPN+ | | at Jacksonville State | W 77–62 | 10–7 (2–4) | 18 – Ilic | 7 – Ilic | 5 – Natt | Pete Mathews Coliseum (773); Jacksonville, AL |
| January 17, 2026; 1:00 pm, ESPN+ | | at FIU | W 76–63 | 11–7 (3–4) | 14 – Coleman | 10 – Nicholas Jr. | 5 – Walker | Ocean Bank Convocation Center (432); Miami, FL |
| January 21, 2026; 6:30 pm, ESPN+ | | Kennesaw State | W 93–87 | 12–7 (4–4) | 23 – King | 10 – Natt | 5 – Natt | Bernard Johnson Coliseum (1,388); Huntsville, TX |
| January 24, 2026; 2:30 pm, ESPN+ | | Western Kentucky | W 73–58 | 13–7 (5–4) | 27 – King | 8 – Natt | 5 – Nicholas Jr. | Bernard Johnson Coliseum (1,026); Huntsville, TX |
| January 28, 2026; 7:00 pm, ESPN+ | | at Missouri State | W 80–71 | 14–7 (6–4) | 16 – Walker | 7 – Tied | 4 – Begg | Great Southern Bank Arena (2,316); Springfield, MO |
| January 31, 2026; 9:00 pm, ESPN2 | | Louisiana Tech | W 83–67 | 15–7 (7–4) | 20 – Walker | 11 – Natt | 3 – Begg | Bernard Johnson Coliseum (1,510); Huntsville, TX |
| February 4, 2026; 6:30 pm, ESPN+ | | UTEP | W 70–66 | 16–7 (8–4) | 17 – King | 12 – Natt | 5 – King | Bernard Johnson Coliseum (1,261); Huntsville, TX |
| February 7, 2026; 2:00 pm, ESPN+ | | at Louisiana Tech | L 78–87 | 16–8 (8–5) | 21 – King | 5 – Natt | 4 – Tied | Thomas Assembly Center (2,670); Ruston, LA |
| February 14, 2026; 4:00 pm, ESPN+ | | at Kennesaw State | W 83–79 | 17–8 (9–5) | 21 – Nicholas Jr. | 10 – Natt | 7 – Walker | VyStar Arena (1,103); Kennesaw, GA |
| February 18, 2026; 6:30 pm, ESPN+ | | Middle Tennessee | W 78–70 | 18–8 (10–5) | 20 – Walker | 9 – Ilic | 5 – Ilic | Bernard Johnson Coliseum (1,202); Huntsville, TX |
| February 21, 2026; 2:30 pm, ESPN+ | | Jacksonville State | W 82–78 | 19–8 (11–5) | 19 – King | 10 – Natt | 3 – Tied | Bernard Johnson Coliseum (852); Huntsville, TX |
| February 26, 2026; 8:00 pm, CBSSN | | FIU | W 100–67 | 20–8 (12–5) | 20 – Walker | 13 – Natt | 6 – Natt | Bernard Johnson Coliseum (1,358); Huntsville, TX |
| February 28, 2026; 4:30 pm, ESPN+ | | Missouri State | W 86–81 | 21–8 (13–5) | 23 – Walker | 9 – Nicholas Jr. | 5 – Nicholas Jr. | Bernard Johnson Coliseum (2,502); Huntsville, TX |
| March 5, 2026; 6:00 pm, CBSSN | | at Delaware | L 80–83 | 21–9 (13–6) | 23 – Walker | 9 – Nicholas Jr. | 6 – Coleman | Bob Carpenter Center (2,041); Newark, DE |
| March 7, 2026; 1:00 pm, ESPN+ | | at Liberty | L 72–79 | 21–10 (13–7) | 21 – Ilic | 16 – Natt | 3 – Tied | Liberty Arena (3,523); Lynchburg, VA |
Conference USA tournament
| March 11, 2026; 8:00 pm, ESPN+ | (2) | vs. (10) New Mexico State; Quarterfinals | W 69–61 | 22–10 | 15 – Coleman | 16 – Natt | 3 – Ilic | Propst Arena (2,220); Huntsville, AL |
| March 13, 2026; 2:00 pm, CBSSN | (2) | vs. (6) Kennesaw State; Semifinals | L 73–79 | 22–11 | 18 – Coleman | 13 – Natt | 6 – Walker | Propst Arena (2,467); Huntsville, AL |
NIT
| March 18, 2026; 8:00 pm, ESPN+ | | at (1 AL) New Mexico; First round | L 83–107 | 22–12 | 22 – Beaumont | 10 – Ilic | 6 – Walker | The Pit (7,286); Albuquerque, NM |
*Non-conference game. ^{#}Rankings from AP poll. (#) Tournament seedings in parentheses. AL=Albuquerque. All times are in Central.
