= 2025–26 UTEP Miners men's basketball team =

American college basketball season

2025–26 UTEP Miners men's basketball
- Conference: Conference USA
- Record: 11–20 (7–13 CUSA)
- Head coach: Joe Golding (5th season)
- Associate head coach: Jeremy Cox (1st, 4th overall season)
- Assistant coaches: Byren Spriggs (5th season); Hunter Jenkins (1st season); Reggie Miller (2nd season)
- Home arena: Don Haskins Center (Capacity: 11,892)

2025–26 Conference USA men's basketball standings
	Conf.				Overall
Team	W		L	PCT	W		L	PCT
Liberty	17	–	3	.850	26	–	8	.765
Sam Houston	13	–	7	.650	22	–	12	.647
Western Kentucky	11	–	9	.550	18	–	14	.563
Louisiana Tech	11	–	9	.550	20	–	14	.588
Middle Tennessee	11	–	9	.550	17	–	15	.531
Kennesaw State †	10	–	10	.500	21	–	14	.600
Jacksonville State	10	–	10	.500	15	–	17	.469
FIU	8	–	12	.400	15	–	17	.469
Missouri State	8	–	12	.400	16	–	18	.471
New Mexico State	8	–	12	.400	16	–	16	.500
UTEP	7	–	13	.350	11	–	20	.355
Delaware	6	–	14	.300	10	–	21	.323
† 2026 CUSA tournament winner

The 2025–26 UTEP Miners men's basketball team represented the University of Texas at El Paso during the 2025–26 NCAA Division I men's basketball season. The Miners, led by fifth-year head coach Joe Golding, played their home games at the Don Haskins Center in El Paso, Texas as a member of Conference USA.

This marked UTEP's final season as members of Conference USA before transitioning to the Mountain West Conference on July 1, 2026.

== Previous season ==
The UTEP finished the 2025-26 season 18–15, 7–11 in Conference USA to finish eighth in the conference. As the 8-seed in the Conference USA Tournament they defeated 9-seed Sam Houston in the First Round before falling to top-seeded Liberty 60–81 in the Quarterfinals to end their season.

== Offseason ==
=== Departures ===
Name	Number	Pos.	Height	Weight	Year	Hometown	Reason for departure
DaCannon Wickware	0	F	6'7"	210	Sophomore	Dallas, TX	Transferred to Midwestern State
Baylor Hebb	3	G	6'2"	180	Senior	Colleyville, TX	Entered transfer portal
Corey Camper Jr.	4	G	6'5"	180	Senior	Little Rock, AR	Transferred to Nevada
David Terrell Jr.	5	G	6'4"	185	Sophomore	Dallas, TX	Transferred to North Texas
Ahamad Bynum	12	G	6'3"	180	(redshirt) Junior	Chicago, IL	Transferred to Southern Indiana
Devon Barnes	13	G	6'1"	180	Sophomore	El Paso, TX	Transferred to Ball State
Antwonne Holmes	15	G	6'3"	170	(redshirt) Sophomore	El Paso, TX	Transferred to Sul Ross State
Raijon Dispenza	20	F	6'9"	210	Freshman	Mullica Hill, NJ	Departed program
Otis Frazier III	23	F	6'6"	210	Senior	Buckeye, AZ	Out of eligibility
Babacar Mbengue	25	F	7'0"	250	(redshirt) Freshman	Dakar, Senegal	Transferred to Kansas City
Derick Hamilton	32	F	6'10"	275	Senior	Baton Rouge, LA	Entered transfer portal
Kevin Kalu	34	F	6'9"	235	Senior	Baltimore, MD	Out of eligibility

=== Incoming transfers ===
Name	Number	Pos.	Height	Weight	Year	Hometown	Previous college
David Tubek	0	F	6'7"	220	Junior	Juba, South Sudan	Seton Hall
Caleb Blackwell	4	G	6'1"	185	Junior	Buford, GA	South Plains College
Tyreese Watson	5	G	6'4"	190	Senior	Philadelphia, PA	Louisiana-Monroe
C.J. Smith	6	F	6'7"	210	Sophomore	Oklahoma City, OK	Oklahoma State
LA Hayes	7	G	6'5"	185	Junior	Cleveland, OH	Frank Phillips College
Kaseem Watson	13	F	6'9"	200	Junior	Philadelphia, PA	Delaware State
Jamal West Jr.	15	F	6'6"	225	Senior	Baltimore, MD	Nicholls
Cassius Brooks	23	G	6'0"	185	Senior	Chicago, IL	Arkansas Tech
Mouhamed Mbaye	25	C	6'10"	235	Junior	Saint-Louis, Senegal	Trinity Valley CC

=== 2025 recruiting class ===
College recruiting
Name	Hometown	School	Height	Weight	Commit date
Bobby Montgomery Jr. SF	Baltimore, MD	Mt. Zion Prep	6 ft 5 in (1.96 m)	175 lb (79 kg)	Nov 13, 2024
Bobby Montgomery Jr. SF	Recruit ratings: Rivals: 247Sports: ESPN: (NR)				
Overall recruit ranking: Scout: – Rivals: –
Note: In many cases, Scout, Rivals, 247Sports, On3, and ESPN may conflict in their listings of height and weight.; In these cases, the average was taken. ESPN grades are on a 100-point scale.; Sources: "2025 UTEP Basketball Recruiting Commits". Scout.; "Scout.com Team Recruiting Rankings". Scout.; "2025 Team Ranking". Rivals.

== Roster ==
2025–26 UTEP Miners men's basketball team
Players
Coaches

Pos.	#	Name	Height	Weight	Year	Previous school	Hometown
F	0	David Tubek	6 ft 7 in (2.01 m)	220 lb (100 kg)	Jr	Seton Hall	Juba, South Sudan
G	1	KJ Thomas	6 ft 1 in (1.85 m)	175 lb (79 kg)	So	Randall HS	Amarillo, Texas
G	2	Jordan Hernandez	5 ft 11 in (1.8 m)	175 lb (79 kg)	RS Jr	Cochise College	El Paso, Texas
G	3	Bobby Montgomery Jr.	6 ft 5 in (1.96 m)	200 lb (91 kg)	Fr	Mt. Zion Prep	Baltimore, Maryland
G	4	Caleb Blackwell	6 ft 1 in (1.85 m)	185 lb (84 kg)	Jr	South Plains College	Buford, Georgia
G	5	Tyreese Watson	6 ft 4 in (1.93 m)	190 lb (86 kg)	Sr	Louisiana–Monroe	Philadelphia, Pennsylvania
F	6	C.J Smith	6 ft 7 in (2.01 m)	210 lb (95 kg)	So	Oklahoma State	Oklahoma City, Oklahoma
G	7	LA Hayes	6 ft 5 in (1.96 m)	185 lb (84 kg)	Jr	Frank Phillips College	Cleveland, Ohio
G	11	Trey Horton III	6 ft 5 in (1.96 m)	205 lb (93 kg)	Jr	Providence Day School	Charlotte, North Carolina
F	13	Kaseem Watson	6 ft 9 in (2.06 m)	200 lb (91 kg)	Jr	Delaware State	Philadelphia, Pennsylvania
F	15	Jamal West Jr.	6 ft 6 in (1.98 m)	225 lb (102 kg)	Sr	Nicholls	Baltimore, Maryland
G	23	Cassius Brooks	6 ft 0 in (1.83 m)	185 lb (84 kg)	Sr	Arkansas Tech	Chicago, Illinois
C	25	Mouhamed Mbaye	6 ft 10 in (2.08 m)	235 lb (107 kg)	Jr	Trinity Valley CC	Saint-Louis, Senegal
F	33	Elijah Jones	6 ft 8 in (2.03 m)	220 lb (100 kg)	Jr	East Carolina	Pleasantville, New Jersey

Head coach

- Joe Golding (Abilene Christian)

Assistant coach(es)

- Jeremy Cox (Colorado Mesa)
- Byren Spriggs (Slippery Rock)
- Hunter Jenkins (Louisiana Tech)
- Reggie Miller (Abilene Christian)

Legend

- (C) Team captain
- (S) Suspended
- (I) Ineligible
- (W) Walk-on
- Injured
- Current redshirt

Roster
Last update: 2025-10-29

== Schedule and results ==
Date time, TV	Rank^{#}	Opponent^{#}	Result	Record	High points	High rebounds	High assists	Site (attendance) city, state
Non-conference regular season
November 3, 2025*; 7:00 p.m., ESPN+		UT Permian Basin	W 98–56	1–0	18 – Watson	8 – Tied	7 – Thomas	Don Haskins Center (3,038); El Paso, TX
November 7, 2025*; 7:00 p.m., ESPN+		Western New Mexico	W 107–70	2–0	16 – Tied	8 – Mbaye	7 – Watson	Don Haskins Center (3,516); El Paso, TX
November 11, 2025*; 7:00 p.m., ESPN+		Loyola Marymount	L 58–71	2–1	14 – West Jr.	4 – Jones	5 – Watson	Don Haskins Center (3,534); El Paso, TX
November 15, 2025*; 2:00 p.m., MW Network		at Utah State	L 51–75	2–2	13 – Jones	4 – Tied	3 – Brooks	Smith Spectrum (7,942); Logan, UT
November 19, 2025*; 7:00 p.m., ESPN+		St. Thomas (TX)	W 84–83 ^{OT}	3–2	20 – West	8 – Tied	5 – Thomas	Don Haskins Center (3,202); El Paso, TX
November 24, 2025*; 2:00 p.m., PTB Live		vs. William & Mary; Jacksonville Classic	L 63–74	3–3	13 – Blackwell	5 – Tied	4 – Watson	John Hurst Adams Gymnasium (246); Jacksonville, FL
November 25, 2025*; 2:00 p.m., PTB Live		vs. UAB; Jacksonville Classic	L 59–75	3–4	21 – Jones	3 – Tied	4 – Thomas	John Hurst Adams Gymnasium (146); Jacksonville, FL
December 7, 2025*; 6:00 p.m., ESPN+		at Seattle	L 68–75	3–5	21 – West	14 – West	3 – Thomas	Climate Pledge Arena (1,253); Seattle, WA
December 13, 2025*; 10:00 p.m., ESPN+		at Hawaii	L 61–66	3–6	12 – Tied	7 – Tied	3 – Blackwell	Stan Sheriff Center (4,694); Honolulu, HI
December 21, 2025*; 7:00 p.m., ESPN+		Norfolk State; Sun Bowl Invitational semifinals	L 71–72	3–7	18 – Blackwell	13 – West Jr.	7 – Blackwell	Don Haskins Center (3,525); El Paso, TX
December 22, 2025; 5:00 p.m., ESPN+		North Dakota State; Sun Bowl Invitational consolation game	W 76–66	4–7	24 – Jones	6 – West Jr.	4 – Thomas	Don Haskins Center (3,538); El Paso, TX
Conference USA regular season
December 29, 2025; 5:30 p.m., ESPN+		at Louisiana Tech	L 63–75	4–8 (0–1)	16 – Watson	8 – West Jr.	4 – Blackwell	Thomas Assembly Center (1,910); Ruston, LA
January 2, 2026; 6:00 p.m., ESPN+		at Missouri State	L 55-79	4-9 (0-2)	12 – Tied	5 – Jones	6 – Thomas	Great Southern Bank Arena (1,846); Springfield, MO
January 4, 2026; 2:00 p.m., ESPN+		at FIU	L 64-76	4-10 (0-3)	25 – Watson	8 – West Jr.	5 – Thomas	Ocean Bank Convocation Center (323); Miami, FL
January 8, 2026; 7:00 p.m., CBSSN		Middle Tennessee	W 83–80 ^{OT}	5–10 (1–3)	23 – Watson	10 – Hayes	4 – Thomas	Don Haskins Center (4,368); El Paso, TX
January 10, 2026; 2:00 p.m., ESPN+		Western Kentucky	L 56–68	5–11 (1–4)	15 – West Jr.	8 – Watson	6 – Thomas	Don Haskins Center (4,392); El Paso, TX
January 15, 2026; 5:00 p.m., ESPN+		at Delaware	W 70–69	6–11 (2–4)	20 – Watson	10 – West Jr.	3 – Tied	Bob Carpenter Center (2,113); Newark, DE
January 17, 2026; 1:00 p.m., ESPN+		at Liberty	L 69–80	6–12 (2–5)	21 – Jones	7 – Jones	7 – Blackwell	Liberty Arena (3,082); Lynchburg, VA
January 22, 2026; 7:00 p.m., ESPN+		FIU	W 83–77	7–12 (3–5)	28 – West Jr.	7 – West Jr.	5 – West Jr.	Don Haskins Center (3,186); El Paso, TX
January 24, 2026; 2:00 p.m., ESPN+		Missouri State	L 57–62	7-13 (3-6)	16 – Jones	8 – West Jr.	3 – Tied	Don Haskins Center (3,788); El Paso, TX
January 28, 2026; 7:00 p.m., ESPN+		Louisiana Tech	L 59–69	7–14 (3–7)	25 – Jones	11 – West Jr.	3 – Tied	Don Haskins Center (3,335); El Paso, TX
January 31, 2026; 7:00 p.m., ESPN+		Delaware	W 70–55	8–14 (4–7)	15 – Tied	12 – Jones	3 – Tied	Don Haskins Center (4,077); El Paso, TX
February 4, 2026; 5:30 p.m., ESPN+		at Sam Houston	L 66–70	8–15 (4–8)	22 – Blackwell	7 – Tied	3 – Blackwell	Bernard Johnson Coliseum (1,261); Huntsville, TX
February 7, 2026; 7:00 p.m., ESPN+		New Mexico State; Battle of I-10	W 91–88 ^{OT}	9–15 (5–8)	21 – Blackwell	12 – Tied	5 – Blackwell	Don Haskins Center (7,862); El Paso, TX
February 11, 2026; 5:00 p.m., ESPN+		at Jacksonville State	W 69–64	10–15 (6–8)	16 – Tied	8 – Watson	6 – Blackwell	Pete Mathews Coliseum (1,263); Jacksonville, AL
February 14, 2026; 7:00 p.m., ESPN2		Liberty	L 64–73	10–16 (6–9)	15 – Jones	8 – Jones	3 – Blackwell	Don Haskins Center (3,914); El Paso, TX
February 21, 2026; 7:00 p.m., ESPN+		at New Mexico State; Battle of I-10	L 63–67	10–17 (6–10)	22 – West Jr.	10 – Watson	3 – Blackwell	Pan American Center (7,606); Las Cruces, NM
February 26, 2026; 5:30 p.m., ESPN+		at Middle Tennessee	L 67–77	10–18 (6–11)	24 – Watson	6 – Jones	4 – Thomas	Murphy Center (3,452); Murfreesboro, TN
February 28, 2026; 1:00 p.m., ESPN+		at Western Kentucky	L 65–97	10–19 (6–12)	22 – West Jr.	7 – West Jr.	4 – Blackwell	E.A. Diddle Arena (4,547); Bowling Green, KY
March 5, 2026; 7:00 p.m., CBSSN		Kennesaw State	W 78–71	11–19 (7–12)	28 – West Jr.	8 – Jones	3 – Watson	Don Haskins Center (3,705); El Paso, TX
March 7, 2026; 2:00 p.m., ESPN+		Jacksonville State	L 61–64	11–20 (7–13)	19 – West Jr.	11 – West Jr.	2 – Tied	Don Haskins Center (4,115); El Paso, TX
*Non-conference game. ^{#}Rankings from AP Poll. (#) Tournament seedings in parentheses. All times are in Mountain Time.
