= Talvin Hester =

American basketball coach (born 1978)

Current position
- Title: Head coach
- Team: Louisiana Tech
- Conference: Sun Belt
- Record: 77–54 (.588)

Biographical details
- Born: July 16, 1978 (age 48); Toledo, Ohio, U.S.
- Education: Texas Wesleyan ('03)

Playing career
- 1996–1997: Dallas Christian

Coaching career (HC unless noted)
- 2002–2003: North Lake College (assistant)
- 2003: Texas Rim Rockers (USBL) (assistant)
- 2003–2004: Texas Wesleyan (assistant)
- 2004–2005: Texas College (assistant)
- 2005–2010: Prairie View A&M (assistant)
- 2010–2012: San Jose State (assistant)
- 2012–2013: Stephen F. Austin (assistant)
- 2013–2014: Texas State (assistant)
- 2014–2017: Houston (assistant)
- 2017–2018: Oral Roberts (assistant)
- 2018–2021: Louisiana Tech (assistant)
- 2021–2022: Texas Tech (assistant)
- 2022–present: Louisiana Tech

Head coaching record
- Overall: 77–54 (.588)

Talvin Hester (born July 16, 1978) is an American basketball coach who is the current head coach of the Louisiana Tech Bulldogs men's basketball team.

== Playing career ==
Hester played a single season of college basketball at Dallas Christian College.

== Coaching career ==
In 2002, Hester began his coaching career at North Lake College as an assistant coach, while also serving on the staff of the Texas Rim Rockers of the USBL. He'd move on to serve as an assistant coach at Texas Wesleyan, where he'd earn his degree, and a year later, would join the coaching staff at Texas College. Hester would get his start in the Division I ranks at Prairie View A&M on the staffs of both Darrell Hawkins and Byron Rimm II from 2005 to 2010, before moving on to San Jose State as an assistant. After two seasons with the Spartans, Hester would return to Texas and have two single-season stops at both Stephen F. Austin and Texas State before joining Kelvin Sampson's initial coaching staff at Houston.

In 2017, Hester would spend a season on staff at Oral Roberts before joining Louisiana Tech as an assistant with Eric Konkol. He was on the Bulldogs' staff for its third place squad in the 2021 NIT. For the 2021–22 season, Hester was on staff at Texas Tech under Mark Adams, which reached the Sweet 16 in the 2022 NCAA tournament.

When Konkol left to take the head coaching position at Tulsa, Hester returned to Louisiana Tech as the 19th coach in program history.

== Head coaching record ==
Record table
Season	Team	Overall	Conference	Standing	Postseason
Louisiana Tech Bulldogs (Conference USA) (2022–2026)
2022–23	Louisiana Tech	15–18	7–13	T–9th	
2023–24	Louisiana Tech	22–10	12–4	2nd	
2024–25	Louisiana Tech	20–12	9–9	6th	
2025–26	Louisiana Tech	20–14	11–9	T–3rd	
2026–27	Louisiana Tech	0–0	0–0		
Louisiana Tech:		77–54 (.588)	39–35 (.527)		
Total:		77–54 (.588)			
National champion Postseason invitational champion Conference regular season champion Conference regular season and conference tournament champion Division regular season champion Division regular season and conference tournament champion Conference tournament champion
