= 2025–26 Jacksonville State Gamecocks men's basketball team =

American college basketball season

2025–26 Jacksonville State Gamecocks men's basketball
- Conference: Conference USA
- Record: 15–17 (10–10 C-USA)
- Head coach: Ray Harper (10th season)
- Associate head coach: Dennan Morrow
- Assistant coaches: Kevin Jones; Patrick Moynihan; Rusty Elmore
- Home arena: Pete Mathews Coliseum

2025–26 Conference USA men's basketball standings
	Conf.				Overall
Team	W		L	PCT	W		L	PCT
Liberty	17	–	3	.850	26	–	8	.765
Sam Houston	13	–	7	.650	22	–	12	.647
Western Kentucky	11	–	9	.550	18	–	14	.563
Louisiana Tech	11	–	9	.550	20	–	14	.588
Middle Tennessee	11	–	9	.550	17	–	15	.531
Kennesaw State †	10	–	10	.500	21	–	14	.600
Jacksonville State	10	–	10	.500	15	–	17	.469
FIU	8	–	12	.400	15	–	17	.469
Missouri State	8	–	12	.400	16	–	18	.471
New Mexico State	8	–	12	.400	16	–	16	.500
UTEP	7	–	13	.350	11	–	20	.355
Delaware	6	–	14	.300	10	–	21	.323
† 2026 CUSA tournament winner

The 2025–26 Jacksonville State Gamecocks men's basketball team represented Jacksonville State University during the 2025–26 NCAA Division I men's basketball season. The Gamecocks, led by tenth-year head coach Ray Harper, played their home games at the Pete Mathews Coliseum in Jacksonville, Alabama as third-year members of Conference USA.

== Previous season ==
The Gamecocks finished the 2024–25 season 23–13, 12–6 in C-USA play, to finish in a tie for second place. They defeated FIU and Middle Tennessee before falling to top-seeded Liberty in the C-USA tournament championship game. They received an at-large bid to the NIT, where they would defeat Georgia Tech in the first round, before being defeated by eventual tournament runner-up UC Irvine in the second round.

== Preseason ==
On October 9, 2025, Conference USA released their preseason poll. Jacksonville State was picked to finish seventh in the conference.

=== Preseason rankings ===
C-USA Preseason Poll
Place	Team	Votes
1	Liberty	143 (11)
2	Kennesaw State	126 (1)
3	New Mexico State	113
4	Middle Tennessee	103
5	Louisiana Tech	82
6	Western Kentucky	79
7	Jacksonville State	67
8	UTEP	66
9	Sam Houston	56
10	FIU	36
11	Delaware	35
12	Missouri State	30
(#) first-place votes

=== Preseason All C-USA Team ===
Preseason All C-USA Team
Player	Year	Position
Mostapha El Moutaouakkil	Senior	Guard

== Roster ==
2025–26 Jacksonville State Gamecocks men's basketball team
Players
Coaches

Pos.	#	Name	Height	Weight	Year	Previous school	Hometown
G	0	AC Bryant	6 ft 3 in (1.91 m)	200 lb (91 kg)	Sr	Alabama A&M	Shreveport, Louisiana
G	1	Marcus Fitzgerald Jr.	6 ft 2 in (1.88 m)	190 lb (86 kg)	GS	Tennessee State	Nashville, Tennessee
G	2	Jacoby Hill	6 ft 4 in (1.93 m)	200 lb (91 kg)	Fr	Central High School	Phenix City, Alabama
G	3	Jaye Nash	6 ft 3 in (1.91 m)	195 lb (88 kg)	So	Tulsa	Memphis, Tennessee
F	4	Aidan Driggers (W)	6 ft 6 in (1.98 m)	215 lb (98 kg)	Sr	Marion Military Institute	Oneonta, Alabama
G/F	5	Bencao Vungo	6 ft 6 in (1.98 m)	215 lb (98 kg)	Jr	East Carolina	Chitato, Angola
G	7	Toby Nnadozie	6 ft 3 in (1.91 m)	190 lb (86 kg)	Sr	Coppin State	Baltimore, Maryland
G	8	Jordan Vick	5 ft 10 in (1.78 m)	160 lb (73 kg)	Fr	Word of God Christian Academy	Rocky Mount, North Carolina
G	11	Jamar Franklin	6 ft 3 in (1.91 m)	185 lb (84 kg)	Sr	Georgia Southern	Rockledge, Florida
F	13	Emondrek Erkins-Ford	6 ft 9 in (2.06 m)	220 lb (100 kg)	Jr	Eastern Florida State College	Chicago, Illinois
G	14	Connor Loy	5 ft 11 in (1.8 m)	180 lb (82 kg)	Fr	Adair County High School	Columbia, Kentucky
F	21	Aitor Anabitarte	6 ft 8 in (2.03 m)	225 lb (102 kg)	GS	St. Francis (IL)	Lasarte-Oria, Spain
G	23	Mostapha El Moutaouakkil	6 ft 6 in (1.98 m)	200 lb (91 kg)	Sr	Louisiana	Rabat, Morocco
F	42	Thomas Tut	6 ft 10 in (2.08 m)	225 lb (102 kg)	Sr	Southeastern Louisiana	Juba, South Sudan
F	99	Iaroslav Niagu	7 ft 0 in (2.13 m)	245 lb (111 kg)	Jr	Charlotte	Krasnodar, Russia

Head coach

- Ray Harper (Kentucky Wesleyan)

Assistant coach(es)

- Dennan Morrow (Kansas State)
- Kevin Jones (Bowie State)
- Patrick Moynihan (North Georgia)
- Rusty Elmore (Middle Tennessee)

Legend

- (C) Team captain
- (S) Suspended
- (I) Ineligible
- (W) Walk-on
- Injured
- Current redshirt

Roster
Last update: December 6, 2025

== Schedule and results ==
Date time, TV	Rank^{#}	Opponent^{#}	Result	Record	High points	High rebounds	High assists	Site (attendance) city, state
Non-conference regular season
November 3, 2025*; 6:00 pm, ESPN+		Oakwood	W 117–63	1–0	27 – El Moutaouakkil	10 – Tied	4 – Tied	Pete Mathews Coliseum (1,985); Jacksonville, AL
November 10, 2025*; 11:00 am, ESPN+		Reinhardt	W 114–39	2–0	20 – El Moutaouakkil	16 – Vungo	4 – Nash	Pete Mathews Coliseum (1,927); Jacksonville, AL
November 14, 2025*; 6:00 pm, ESPN+		Coastal Carolina	W 74–67	3–0	33 – El Moutaouakkil	6 – Tied	5 – Nash	Pete Mathews Coliseum (2,023); Jacksonville, AL
November 19, 2025*; 6:00 pm, ESPN+		South Alabama	L 65−71	3−1	24 – Bryant	8 – Bryant	12 – Nash	Pete Mathews Coliseum (2,366); Jacksonville, AL
November 24, 2025*; 7:00 pm, ESPN+		at Arkansas State; Arkansas State Thanksgiving MTE	L 63−74	3−2	16 – El Moutaouakkil	6 – Tied	2 – Tied	First National Bank Arena (3,071); Jonesboro, AR
November 26, 2025*; 2:00 pm		vs. North Dakota State; Arkansas State Thanksgiving MTE	L 43–56	3–3	9 – Tied	8 – El Moutaouakkil	2 – Tied	First National Bank Arena (203); Jonesboro, AR
December 1, 2025*; 6:00 pm, ESPN+		North Alabama	L 66–73	3–4	19 – El Moutaouakkil	8 – Bryant	8 – Nash	Pete Mathews Coliseum (1,634); Jacksonville, AL
December 7, 2025*; 4:00 pm, ESPN+		Auburn Montgomery	W 66–39	4–4	19 – El Moutaouakkil	10 – El Moutaouakkil	3 – Tied	Pete Mathews Coliseum (1,124); Jacksonville, AL
December 13, 2025*; 6:00 pm, ESPN+		at Georgia State	L 73–77	4–5	18 – El Moutaouakkil	8 – Tied	6 – Nash	GSU Convocation Center (1,698); Atlanta, GA
December 17, 2025*; 6:00 pm, ESPN+		Eastern Kentucky	L 59–62	4–6	16 – El Moutaouakkil	7 – El Moutaouakkil	4 – Niagu	Pete Mathews Coliseum; Jacksonville, AL
December 20, 2025*; 3:00 pm, ESPN+		at East Tennessee State	W 81–75	5–6	29 – Bryant	8 – Erkins-Ford	3 – Tied	Freedom Hall Civic Center (2,270); Johnson City, TN
Conference USA regular season
December 29, 2025; 6:00 pm, ESPN+		Western Kentucky	W 78–67	6–6 (1–0)	23 – Bryant	8 – El Moutaouakkil	3 – Erkins-Ford	Pete Mathews Coliseum (1,755); Jacksonville, AL
January 2, 2026; 6:00 pm, ESPN+		at Delaware	W 67–64	7–6 (2–0)	22 – El Moutaouakkil	6 – Bryant	3 – Nash	Bob Carpenter Center (1,686); Newark, DE
January 4, 2026; 1:00 pm, ESPN+		at Liberty	L 69–78	7–7 (2–1)	24 – Erkins-Ford	8 – EL Moutaouakkil	4 – Nash	Liberty Arena (3,087); Lynchburg, VA
January 7, 2026; 6:00 pm, ESPN+		FIU	W 71–64	8–7 (3–1)	19 – Hill	6 – Tied	7 – Nash	Pete Mathews Coliseum (823); Jacksonville, AL
January 10, 2026; 4:00 pm, ESPN+		at Kennesaw State	L 82–88	8–8 (3–2)	23 – El Moutaouakkil	10 – El Moutaouakkil	6 – Nash	VyStar Arena (2,141); Kennesaw, GA
January 14, 2026; 6:00 pm, ESPN+		Sam Houston	L 62–77	8–9 (3–3)	17 – El Moutaouakkil	10 – El Moutaouakkil	2 – El Moutaouakkil	Pete Mathews Coliseum (773); Jacksonville, AL
January 17, 2026; 4:00 pm, ESPN+		Louisiana Tech	W 64–60	9–9 (4–3)	18 – El Moutaouakkil	6 – El Moutaouakkil	4 – Hill	Pete Mathews Coliseum (1,137); Jacksonville, AL
January 23, 2026; 6:00 pm, ESPN+		Middle Tennessee	W 75–58	10–9 (5–3)	22 – Bryant	7 – Tied	5 – Nash	Pete Mathews Coliseum; Jacksonville, AL
January 28, 2026; 6:00 pm, ESPN+		at FIU	W 78–74	11–9 (6–3)	31 – El Moutaouakkil	7 – Niagu	4 – Tied	Ocean Bank Convocation Center (1,124); Miami, FL
January 31, 2026; 2:00 pm, ESPN+		at Missouri State	L 67–74	11–10 (6–4)	16 – Hill	9 – El Moutaouakkil	2 – Tied	Great Southern Bank Arena (2,634); Springfield, MO
February 5, 2026; 8:00 pm, CBSSN		at Western Kentucky	W 71–66	12–10 (7–4)	19 – Niagu	12 – Niagu	2 – Tied	E. A. Diddle Arena (3,247); Bowling Green, KY
February 7, 2026; 7:00 pm, ESPN+		Kennesaw State	W 77–58	13–10 (8–4)	12 – Tied	6 – Simpson	3 – Washington III	Pete Mathews Coliseum (1,867); Jacksonville, AL
February 11, 2026; 6:00 pm, ESPN+		UTEP	L 64–69	13–11 (8–5)	17 – Bryant	7 – Niagu	5 – Nash	Pete Mathews Coliseum (1,263); Jacksonville, AL
February 14, 2026; 4:00 pm, ESPN+		New Mexico State	L 70–79	13–12 (8–6)	21 – Hill	6 – El Moutaouakkil	3 – Nash	Pete Mathews Coliseum (894); Jacksonville, AL
February 18, 2026; 6:30 pm, ESPN+		at Louisiana Tech	L 71–77	13–13 (8–7)	27 – El Moutaouakkil	6 – Niagu	5 – Nash	Thomas Assembly Center (1,959); Ruston, LA
February 21, 2026; 2:30 pm, ESPN+		at Sam Houston	L 78–82	13–14 (8–8)	38 – El Moutaouakkil	6 – Bryant	5 – Nash	Bernard Johnson Coliseum (852); Huntsville, TX
February 26, 2026; 6:00 pm, CBSSN		Delaware	W 80–70 ^{OT}	14–14 (9–8)	24 – Franklin	10 – El Moutaouakkil	6 – Nash	Pete Mathews Coliseum (873); Jacksonville, AL
February 28, 2026; 5:00 pm, ESPNU		Liberty	L 78–81	14–15 (9–9)	21 – El Moutaouakkil	6 – El Moutaouakkil	5 – Nash	Pete Mathews Coliseum (1,573); Jacksonville, AL
March 5, 2026; 8:00 pm, ESPN+		at New Mexico State	L 75–77	14–16 (9–10)	25 – Hill	15 – Hill	3 – Nash	Pan American Center (6,648); Las Cruces, NM
March 7, 2026; 3:00 pm, ESPN+		at UTEP	W 64–61	15–16 (10–10)	23 – El Moutaouakkil	7 – El Moutaouakkil	3 – Hill	Don Haskins Center (4,115); El Paso, TX
Conference USA tournament
March 10, 2026; 8:00 pm, ESPN+	(7)	vs. (10) New Mexico State; First Round	L 63–68	15–17	23 – El Moutaouakkil	11 – El Moutaouakkil	4 – Tied	Propst Arena (3,207); Huntsville, AL
*Non-conference game. ^{#}Rankings from AP Poll. (#) Tournament seedings in parentheses. All times are in Central.
