= 2025–26 Middle Tennessee Blue Raiders men's basketball team =

American college basketball season

2025–26 Middle Tennessee Blue Raiders men's basketball
- Conference: Conference USA
- Record: 17–15 (11–9 CUSA)
- Head coach: Nick McDevitt (8th season)
- Associate head coach: Wes Long
- Assistant coaches: Logan Johnson; Eric Wilson; Adell Harris; Joshua Bone
- Home arena: Murphy Center

2025–26 Conference USA men's basketball standings
	Conf.				Overall
Team	W		L	PCT	W		L	PCT
Liberty	17	–	3	.850	25	–	7	.781
Sam Houston	13	–	7	.650	22	–	11	.667
Western Kentucky	11	–	9	.550	18	–	14	.563
Louisiana Tech	11	–	9	.550	20	–	14	.588
Middle Tennessee	11	–	9	.550	17	–	15	.531
Kennesaw State †	10	–	10	.500	21	–	13	.618
Jacksonville State	10	–	10	.500	15	–	17	.469
FIU	8	–	12	.400	15	–	17	.469
Missouri State	8	–	12	.400	16	–	18	.471
New Mexico State	8	–	12	.400	16	–	16	.500
UTEP	7	–	13	.350	11	–	20	.355
Delaware	6	–	14	.300	10	–	21	.323
† 2026 CUSA tournament winner As of March 14, 2026

The 2025–26 Middle Tennessee Blue Raiders men's basketball team represented Middle Tennessee State University during the 2025–26 NCAA Division I men's basketball season. The team was led by eighth-year head coach Nick McDevitt and played their home games at Murphy Center in Murfreesboro, Tennessee as members of Conference USA (C-USA).

== Previous season ==
The Blue Raiders finished the 2024–25 season 22–12, 12–6 in C-USA play to finish in a tie for second place. As the No. 3 seed in the C-USA tournament they defeated Louisiana Tech in quarterfinals before losing to Jacksonville State in the semifinals. They received an invitation to the National Invitation Tournament as the No. 4 seed in the Dayton region. The Blue Raiders lost to Chattanooga in the first round.

== Roster ==
2025–26 Middle Tennessee Blue Raiders men's basketball team
Players
Coaches

Pos.	#	Name	Height	Weight	Year	Hometown
G	0	Alec Oglesby	6 ft 5 in (1.96 m)	210 lb (95 kg)	GS	Lawrenceville, GA
G	1	Marcus Whitlock Jr.	6 ft 3 in (1.91 m)	185 lb (84 kg)	RS So	Monticello, GA
G	2	Jahvin Carter	6 ft 3 in (1.91 m)	195 lb (88 kg)	So	Alcoa, TN
C	3	Luka Jovanovic	6 ft 11 in (2.11 m)	235 lb (107 kg)	Fr	Belgrade, Serbia
F	5	Jarred Hall	6 ft 9 in (2.06 m)	230 lb (104 kg)	Jr	Lebanon, TN
G	7	Charvez Ambrose	6 ft 5 in (1.96 m)	180 lb (82 kg)	Jr	Memphis, TN
G	8	Jax Howard	6 ft 0 in (1.83 m)	170 lb (77 kg)	Fr	Shelbyville, TN
F	10	Torey Alston	6 ft 9 in (2.06 m)	220 lb (100 kg)	RS So	Durham, NC
G	11	Tre Green	6 ft 3 in (1.91 m)	195 lb (88 kg)	Sr	Baltimore, MD
C	12	Brandon Oloumou	6 ft 9 in (2.06 m)	215 lb (98 kg)	Jr	Nassau, Bahamas
F	13	Chris Loofe	6 ft 11 in (2.11 m)	240 lb (109 kg)	Jr	Leander, TX
G	20	Savon Wykle	6 ft 5 in (1.96 m)	200 lb (91 kg)	GS	Smyrna, TN
G	22	Kamari Lands	6 ft 8 in (2.03 m)	230 lb (104 kg)	Sr	Indianapolis, IN
G	23	James Dent Jr.	6 ft 5 in (1.96 m)	170 lb (77 kg)	GS	Springfield, IL
G	55	Sean Smith	6 ft 3 in (1.91 m)	185 lb (84 kg)	GS	Louisville, KY

Head coach

- Nick McDevitt (UNC Asheville)

Assistant coach(es)

- Wes Long (Clemson)
- Logan Johnson (Coastal Carolina)
- Eric Wilson (Western Carolina)
- Adell Harris (Wake Forest)
- Joshua Bone (Tennessee)

Legend

- (C) Team captain
- (S) Suspended
- (I) Ineligible
- (W) Walk-on
- Injured
- Current redshirt

Roster

Weekly Awards:

- CUSA Player of the Week:
  - Torey Alston (2: W3, 7)
  - Alec Ogelsby (1: W9)

== Schedule and results ==
Date time, TV	Rank^{#}	Opponent^{#}	Result	Record	High points	High rebounds	High assists	Site (attendance) city, state
Exhibition
October 28, 2025*; 7:00 p.m., ESPN+		at Austin Peay	L 55–66	–	12 – Alston	10 – Alston	5 – Smith	F&M Bank Arena (1,177); Clarksville, TN
Non-Conference Regular Season
November 5, 2025*; 10:30 a.m., ESPN+		Milligan	W 100–51	1–0	21 – Lands	12 – Loofe	8 – Carter	Murphy Center (7,813); Murfreesboro, TN
November 8, 2025*; 6:30 p.m., ESPN+		Webster	W 109–56	2–0	14 – Tied	6 – Tied	5 – Smith	Murphy Center (2,503); Murfreesboro, TN
November 12, 2025*; 7:00 p.m., ESPN+		at Evansville	W 77–72	3–0	23 – Lands	6 – Tied	3 – Lands	Ford Center (4,123); Evansville, IN
November 19, 2025*; 5:30 p.m., BTN		at No. 7 Michigan	L 61–86	3–1	18 – Carter	6 – Tied	2 – Tied	Crisler Center (11,188); Ann Arbor, MI
November 23, 2025*; 6:30 p.m., FloCollege		vs. Murray State; Cayman Islands Classic	W 90–87	4–1	26 – Alston	16 – Alston	4 – Tied	John Gray Gymnasium (555); George Town, Cayman Islands
November 24, 2025*; 4:00 p.m., FloCollege		vs. George Washington; Cayman Islands Classic	L 79–92	4–2	17 – Alston	7 – Alston	4 – Carter	John Gray Gymnasium; George Town, Cayman Islands
November 25, 2025*; 4:00 p.m., FloCollege		vs. McNeese; Cayman Islands Classic	L 62–72	4–3	18 – Lands	9 – Alston	4 – Smith	John Gray Gymnasium; George Town, Cayman Islands
December 1, 2025*; 6:30 p.m., ESPN+		UAB	W 76–61	5–3	19 – Alston	8 – Tied	4 – Tied	Murphy Center (3,323); Murfreesboro, TN
December 7, 2025*; 3:30 p.m., ESPN+		Belmont	L 62–83	5–4	14 – Alston	10 – Loofe	5 – Smith	Murphy Center (3,168); Murfreesboro, TN
December 21, 2025*; 1:00 p.m., ESPN+		Cumberland	W 74–58	7–4	20 – Carter	10 – Alston	4 – Smith	Murphy Center (2,511); Murfreesboro, TN
December 29, 2025*; 7:00 p.m., ESPN+		at No. 8 Houston	L 60–69	7–5	18 – Lands	12 – Alston	4 – Tied	Fertitta Center (7,035); Houston, TX
Conference USA Regular Season
December 17, 2025; 6:30 p.m., ESPN+		Kennesaw State	W 68–67	6–4 (1–0)	24 – Lands	9 – Tied	4 – Smith	Murphy Center (2,812); Murfreesboro, TN
January 2, 2026; 6:30 p.m., ESPN+		Louisiana Tech	W 88–51	8–5 (2–0)	25 – Oglesby	10 – Jovanovic	6 – Smith	Murphy Center (3,127); Murfreesboro, TN
January 4, 2026; 1:00 p.m., ESPN+		Sam Houston	W 68–67	9–5 (3–0)	16 – Carter	10 – Loofe	4 – Carter	Murphy Center (3,212); Murfreesboro, TN
January 8, 2026; 8:00 p.m., CBSSN		at UTEP	L 80–83	9–6 (3–1)	16 – Tied	7 – Loofe	7 – Carter	Don Haskins Center (4,368); El Paso, TX
January 10, 2026; 7:00 p.m., ESPNU		at New Mexico State	W 59–55	10–6 (4–1)	16 – Alston	8 – Loofe	5 – Cater	Pan American Center (2,852); Las Cruces, NM
January 14, 2026; 6:30 p.m., ESPN+		at Louisiana Tech	L 58–59	10–7 (4–2)	13 – Lands	9 – Alston	5 – Tied	Thomas Assembly Center (2,082); Ruston, LA
January 17, 2026; 5:00 p.m., ESPN+		Missouri State	W 90–87 ^{2OT}	11–7 (5–2)	22 – Alston	10 – Loofe	5 – Carter	Murphy Center (4,482); Murfreesboro, TN
January 24, 2026; 4:00 p.m., ESPN+		at Jacksonville State	L 58–75	11–8 (5–3)	15 – Lands	5 – Tied	6 – Carter	Pete Mathews Coliseum; Jacksonville, AL
January 29, 2026; 6:00 p.m., CBSSN		Liberty	L 65–81	11–9 (5–4)	20 – Alston	12 – Alston	3 – Smith	Murphy Center (3,922); Murfreesboro, TN
January 31, 2026; 3:00 p.m., CBSSN		Western Kentucky	L 60–65	11–10 (5–5)	25 – Lands	11 – Alston	4 – Tied	Murphy Center (4,127); Murfreesboro, TN
February 4, 2026; 6:30 p.m., ESPN+		FIU	L 84–88 ^{OT}	11–11 (5–6)	25 – Whitlock Jr.	8 – Alston	8 – Carter	Murphy Center (3,512); Murfreesboro, TN
February 7, 2026; 12:00 p.m., ESPN+		at Delaware	L 88–89	11–12 (5–7)	21 – Tied	8 – Loofe	5 – Carter	Bob Carpenter Center (2,460); Newark, DE
February 12, 2026; 5:30 p.m., CBSSN		at Kennesaw State	W 90–87	12–12 (6–7)	22 – Smith	6 – Alston	7 – Lands	Convocation Center (1,676); Kennesaw, GA
February 14, 2026; 7:00 p.m., ESPN+		at Western Kentucky	L 80–82	12–13 (6–8)	20 – Lands	5 – Tied	7 – Smith	E. A. Diddle Arena (4,023); Bowling Green, KY
February 18, 2026; 6:30 p.m., ESPN+		at Sam Houston	L 70–78	12–14 (6–9)	16 – Alston	7 – Loofe	6 – Tied	Bernard Johnson Coliseum (1,202); Huntsville, TX
February 21, 2026; 1:00 p.m., ESPN+		Delaware	W 78–66	13–14 (7–9)	18 – Smith	13 – Loofe	4 – Smith	Murphy Center (4,150); Murfreesboro, TN
February 26, 2026; 6:30 p.m., ESPN+		UTEP	W 77–67	14–14 (8–9)	22 – Lands	13 – Loofe	3 – Oglesby	Murphy Center (3,452); Murfreesboro, TN
February 28, 2026; 12:00 p.m., ESPN+		New Mexico State	W 86–85 ^{OT}	15–14 (9–9)	27 – Carter	12 – Loofe	7 – Carter	Murphy Center (3,121); Murfreesboro, TN
March 5, 2026; 6:00 p.m., ESPN+		at FIU	W 73–67	16–14 (10–9)	25 – Green	8 – Alston	4 – Alston	Ocean Bank Convocation Center (1,735); Miami, FL
March 7, 2026; 2:00 p.m., ESPN+		at Missouri State	W 75–63	17–14 (11–9)	17 – Alston	10 – Alston	5 – Lands	Great Southern Bank Arena (2,578); Springfield, MO
Conference USA tournament
March 12, 2026; 5:30 p.m., ESPN+	(5)	vs. (4) Louisiana Tech; Quarterfinal	L 69–80	17–15	20 – Green	7 – Alston	4 – Smith	Propst Arena (3,029); Huntsville, AL
*Non-conference game. ^{#}Rankings from AP poll. (#) Tournament seedings in parentheses. All times are in Central.
