= 2025–26 Kennesaw State Owls men's basketball team =

American college basketball season

2025–26 Kennesaw State Owls men's basketball

CUSA tournament champions

NCAA tournament, First round
- Conference: Conference USA
- Record: 21–14 (10–10 CUSA)
- Head coach: Antoine Pettway (3rd season)
- Associate head coach: Philip Pearson
- Assistant coaches: Donovan Kates; Willie Watson; Jamie Baker; Perkins Carden
- Home arena: Convocation Center

2025–26 Conference USA men's basketball standings
	Conf.				Overall
Team	W		L	PCT	W		L	PCT
Liberty	17	–	3	.850	26	–	8	.765
Sam Houston	13	–	7	.650	22	–	12	.647
Western Kentucky	11	–	9	.550	18	–	14	.563
Louisiana Tech	11	–	9	.550	20	–	14	.588
Middle Tennessee	11	–	9	.550	17	–	15	.531
Kennesaw State †	10	–	10	.500	21	–	14	.600
Jacksonville State	10	–	10	.500	15	–	17	.469
FIU	8	–	12	.400	15	–	17	.469
Missouri State	8	–	12	.400	16	–	18	.471
New Mexico State	8	–	12	.400	16	–	16	.500
UTEP	7	–	13	.350	11	–	20	.355
Delaware	6	–	14	.300	10	–	21	.323
† 2026 CUSA tournament winner

The 2025–26 Kennesaw State Owls men's basketball team represented Kennesaw State University in the 2025–26 NCAA Division I men's basketball season. The Owls, led by third-year head coach Antoine Pettway, played their home games at the KSU Convocation Center in Kennesaw, Georgia as members of Conference USA (C-USA).

== Previous season ==
The Owls finished the 2024–25 season 19–14, 10–8 in C-USA play, to finish in a tie for fourth place. As the No. 4 seed in the C-USA tournament, they defeated New Mexico State in the quarterfinals, before losing to Liberty in the semifinals.

== Roster ==
2025–26 Kennesaw State Owls men's basketball team
Players
Coaches

Pos.	#	Name	Height	Weight	Year	Hometown
F	0	Ramone Seals	6 ft 6 in (1.98 m)	220 lb (100 kg)	So	Tampa, FL
G	1	Davin Cosby Jr.	6 ft 5 in (1.96 m)	215 lb (98 kg)	Jr	Richmond, VA
F	2	Trey Simpson	6 ft 8 in (2.03 m)	212 lb (96 kg)	Fr	Evergreen, AL
G	3	Darius Washington III	6 ft 5 in (1.96 m)	198 lb (90 kg)	Fr	Orlando, FL
G	4	Kaden Rickard	6 ft 6 in (1.98 m)	211 lb (96 kg)	Fr	Madison, AL
G	5	Simeon Cottle (S)	6 ft 2 in (1.88 m)	175 lb (79 kg)	Sr	College Park, GA
F	6	Frankquon Sherman	6 ft 7 in (2.01 m)	220 lb (100 kg)	Jr	Lincolnton, GA
G	7	Chase Clemons	6 ft 0 in (1.83 m)	178 lb (81 kg)	RS So	Woodstock, GA
F	8	Nigel Thomas	6 ft 8 in (2.03 m)	203 lb (92 kg)	Fr	Cincinnati, OH
G	9	Eric Holland	5 ft 8 in (1.73 m)	153 lb (69 kg)	Sr	Tifton, GA
F	10	Jamil Miller	6 ft 6 in (1.98 m)	205 lb (93 kg)	So	Spokane, WA
G	11	RJ Johnson	6 ft 4 in (1.93 m)	225 lb (102 kg)	RS So	Huntsville, AL
C	12	Perry Smith Jr.	6 ft 8 in (2.03 m)	241 lb (109 kg)	Sr	Augusta, GA
F	13	Braedan Lue	6 ft 9 in (2.06 m)	235 lb (107 kg)	So	Douglasville, GA
G	21	Jaden Harris	6 ft 4 in (1.93 m)	187 lb (85 kg)	GS	Atlanta, GA
F	23	Amir Taylor	6 ft 9 in (2.06 m)	250 lb (113 kg)	Fr	Pittsburgh, PA
G	24	Brendan Tousignaut	6 ft 5 in (1.96 m)	185 lb (84 kg)	Fr	Canton, GA
F	30	Dozie Onyirimba	6 ft 3 in (1.91 m)	196 lb (89 kg)	So	Powder Springs, GA
G	31	Charles Stone	6 ft 2 in (1.88 m)	180 lb (82 kg)	Sr	Columbus, GA

Head coach

- Antoine Pettway (Alabama)

Assistant coach(es)

- Willie Watson (Alabama)
- Donovan Kates (Alabama)
- Philip Pearson (Alabama)
- Jamie Baker (Alabama)
- Perkins Carden (Alabama)

Legend

- (C) Team captain
- (S) Suspended
- (I) Ineligible
- (W) Walk-on
- Injured
- Current redshirt

Roster

== Schedule and results ==
Date time, TV	Rank^{#}	Opponent^{#}	Result	Record	High points	High rebounds	High assists	Site (attendance) city, state
Exhibition
October 26, 2025*		West Georgia	W 86–73	–	–	–	–	Convocation Center; Kennesaw, GA
Regular season
November 3, 2025*; 7:00 p.m., ESPN+		Paine	W 105–29	1–0	18 – Simpson	10 – Seals	7 – Rickard	Convocation Center (2,025); Kennesaw, GA
November 8, 2025*; 1:00 p.m., SWAC TV		at Florida A&M	W 92–72	2–0	16 – Johnson	8 – Sherman	3 – Cottle	Al Lawson Center (704); Tallahassee, FL
November 12, 2025*; 7:00 p.m., ESPN+		Point	W 111–60	3–0	16 – Tied	11 – Sherman	6 – Johnson	Convocation Center (1,805); Kennesaw, GA
November 16, 2025*; 2:00 p.m., ESPN+		South Florida	L 89–108	3–1	25 – Cottle	8 – Tied	6 – Johnson	Convocation Center (2,167); Kennesaw, GA
November 24, 2025*; 4:30 p.m., FloHoops		vs. Rice; Coconut Hoops – Tarpon Bay Division	W 89–84 ^{OT}	4–1	25 – Tied	8 – Seals	4 – Tied	Alico Arena (555); Fort Myers, FL
November 25, 2025*; 4:30 p.m., FloHoops		vs. Oral Roberts; Coconut Hoops – Tarpon Bay Division	L 83–91	4–2	17 – Lue	9 – Lue	2 – Tied	Alico Arena (341); Fort Myers, FL
November 26, 2025*; 7:00 p.m., FloHoops		at Florida Gulf Coast; Coconut Hoops – Tarpon Bay Division	W 102–100 ^{OT}	5–2	33 – Cottle	8 – Lue	3 – Rickard	Alico Arena; Fort Myers, FL
December 2, 2025*; 7:00 p.m., ESPN+		Jackson State	W 88–73	6–2	28 – Cottle	12 – Sherman	3 – Tied	Convocation Center (1,378); Kennesaw, GA
December 6, 2025*; 3:00 p.m., ESPN+		Georgia State	W 92–69	7–2	18 – Taylor	12 – Taylor	4 – Cottle	Convocation Center (3,064); Kennesaw, GA
December 8, 2025*; 12:00 p.m., ESPN+		Southern Wesleyan	W 121–66	8–2	26 – Simpson	8 – Simpson	8 – Rickard	Convocation Center (1,145); Kennesaw, GA
December 17, 2025; 7:30 p.m., ESPN+		at Middle Tennessee	L 67–68	8–3 (0–1)	20 – Lue	15 – Sherman	2 – Tied	Murphy Center (2,812); Murfreesboro, TN
December 21, 2025*; 2:00 p.m., ESPN+		vs. No. 16 Alabama; Rocket City Classic	L 81–92	8–4	20 – Cottle	11 – Sherman	4 – Tied	Propst Arena (4,520); Huntsville, AL
January 2, 2026; 7:00 p.m., ESPNU		at Liberty	L 73–81	8–5 (0–2)	22 – Cottle	12 – Sherman	9 – Washington III	Liberty Arena (3,415); Lynchburg, VA
January 4, 2026; 2:00 p.m., ESPN+		at Delaware	L 52–67	8–6 (0–3)	16 – Cottle	10 – Lue	7 – Cottle	Bob Carpenter Center (1,439); Newark, DE
January 7, 2026; 7:00 p.m., ESPN+		Missouri State	W 90–80	9–6 (1–3)	25 – Cottle	7 – Sherman	11 – Cottle	Convocation Center (1,235); Kennesaw, GA
January 10, 2026; 5:00 p.m., ESPN+		Jacksonville State	W 88–82	10–6 (2–3)	28 – Cottle	8 – Sherman	4 – Tied	Convocation Center (2,141); Kennesaw, GA
January 14, 2026; 7:00 p.m., ESPN+		FIU	W 89–86	11–6 (3–3)	28 – Simpson	16 – Sherman	7 – Johnson	Convocation Center (1,908); Kennesaw, GA
January 17, 2026; 3:00 p.m., ESPN+		at Western Kentucky	W 81–65	12–6 (4–3)	31 – Johnson	10 – Sherman	5 – Johnson	E. A. Diddle Arena (3,823); Bowling Green, KY
January 21, 2026; 7:30 p.m., ESPN+		at Sam Houston	L 87–93	12–7 (4–4)	32 – Johnson	12 – Sherman	5 – Johnson	Bernard Johnson Coliseum (1,388); Huntsville, TX
January 24, 2026; 3:00 p.m., ESPN+		at Louisiana Tech	L 76–82	12–8 (4–5)	20 – Sherman	7 – Tied	4 – Johnson	Thomas Assembly Center (1,852); Ruston, LA
January 28, 2026; 7:00 p.m., ESPN+		Western Kentucky	W 72–69	13–8 (5–5)	19 – Johnson	10 – Sherman	4 – Johnson	Convocation Center (1,636); Kennesaw, GA
January 31, 2026; 5:00 p.m., ESPN+		New Mexico State	W 76–53	14–8 (6–5)	20 – Johnson	9 – Johnson	7 – Johnson	Convocation Center (1,377); Kennesaw, GA
February 7, 2026; 5:00 p.m., ESPN+		at Jacksonville State	L 58–77	14–9 (6–6)	12 – Tied	6 – Simpson	3 – Washington III	Pete Mathews Coliseum (1,867); Jacksonville, AL
February 12, 2026; 6:30 p.m., CBSSN		Middle Tennessee	L 87–90	14–10 (6–7)	23 – Lue	10 – Sherman	7 – Johnson	Convocation Center (1,676); Kennesaw, GA
February 14, 2026; 5:00 p.m., ESPN+		Sam Houston	L 79–83	14–11 (6–8)	21 – Tied	8 – Lue	6 – Johnson	Convocation Center (1,103); Kennesaw, GA
February 18, 2026; 8:00 p.m., ESPN+		at Missouri State	W 91–87	15–11 (7–8)	29 – Johnson	9 – Sherman	4 – Johnson	Great Southern Bank Arena (2,070); Springfield, MO
February 21, 2026; 5:00 p.m., ESPN+		Louisiana Tech	W 58–55	16–11 (8–8)	15 – Johnson	6 – Tied	5 – Johnson	Convocation Center (1,827); Kennesaw, GA
February 26, 2026; 7:00 p.m., ESPN+		Liberty	W 74–65	17–11 (9–8)	25 – Johnson	9 – Sherman	5 – Johnson	Convocation Center (2,046); Kennesaw, GA
February 28, 2026; 5:00 p.m., ESPN+		Delaware	W 90–82	18–11 (10–8)	22 – Harris	14 – Sherman	5 – Harris	Convocation Center (1,633); Kennesaw, GA
March 5, 2026; 9:00 p.m., CBSSN		at UTEP	L 71–78	18–12 (10–9)	15 – Lue	16 – Sherman	5 – Rickard	Don Haskins Center (3,705); El Paso, TX
March 7, 2026; 4:00 p.m., ESPN+		at New Mexico State	L 76–79	18–13 (10–10)	16 – Tied	9 – Sherman	9 – Johnson	Pan American Center (5,375); Las Cruces, NM
Conference USA tournament
March 12, 2026; 9:00 p.m., ESPN+	(6)	vs. (3) Western Kentucky; Quarterfinal	W 96–87	19–13	26 – Simpson	10 – Sherman	6 – Johnson	Propst Arena (3,029); Huntsville, AL
March 13, 2026; 3:00 p.m., CBSSN	(6)	vs. (2) Sam Houston; Semifinal	W 79–73	20–13	23 – Taylor	7 – Sherman	6 – Johnson	Propst Arena (2,467); Huntsville, AL
March 14, 2026; 8:30 p.m., CBSSN	(6)	vs. (4) Louisiana Tech; Championship	W 71–60	21–13	18 – Harris	8 – Simpson	4 – Johnson	Propst Arena (3,235); Huntsville, AL
NCAA tournament
March 19, 2026*; 10:00 p.m., TBS	(14 W)	vs. (3 W) No. 12 Gonzaga; First round	L 64–73	21–14	15 – Tied	10 – Sherman	4 – Johnson	Moda Center (14,070); Portland, OR
*Non-conference game. ^{#}Rankings from AP poll. (#) Tournament seedings in parentheses. W=West. All times are in Eastern.
