= 2025–26 Missouri State Bears basketball team =

American college basketball season

2025–26 Missouri State Bears basketball
- Conference: Conference USA
- Record: 16–18 (8–12 C-USA)
- Head coach: Cuonzo Martin (2nd in current stint, 5th overall season)
- Assistant coaches: Tarrance Crump; Dr. Carson Cunningham; Marco Harris; Steve Woodberry
- Home arena: Great Southern Bank Arena

2025–26 Conference USA men's basketball standings
	Conf.				Overall
Team	W		L	PCT	W		L	PCT
Liberty	17	–	3	.850	25	–	7	.781
Sam Houston	13	–	7	.650	22	–	11	.667
Western Kentucky	11	–	9	.550	18	–	14	.563
Louisiana Tech	11	–	9	.550	20	–	13	.606
Middle Tennessee	11	–	9	.550	17	–	15	.531
Kennesaw State	10	–	10	.500	20	–	13	.606
Jacksonville State	10	–	10	.500	15	–	17	.469
FIU	8	–	12	.400	15	–	17	.469
Missouri State	8	–	12	.400	16	–	18	.471
New Mexico State	8	–	12	.400	16	–	16	.500
UTEP	7	–	13	.350	11	–	20	.355
Delaware	6	–	14	.300	10	–	21	.323
† 2026 CUSA tournament winner As of March 13, 2026

The 2025–26 Missouri State Bears basketball team represented Missouri State University during the 2025–26 NCAA Division I men's basketball season. The Bears, led by head coach Cuonzo Martin in his second season in his second stint, and his fifth overall, played their home games at the Great Southern Bank Arena located in Springfield, Missouri as members of Conference USA.

Missouri State finished the regular season with a 14–17 overall record and an 8–12 conference record, finishing 9th in the Conference USA standings. The Bears defeated FIU and 1–seed Liberty in the first and second rounds of the C-USA Tournament before falling to Louisiana Tech in the semifinals.

== Previous season ==
The Bears finished the 2024–25 season 9–23, 2–18 in MVC play to finish in last place. They lost to Illinois State in the opening round of the MVC tournament.

== Roster ==
2024–25 Missouri State Bears men's basketball team
Players
Coaches

Pos.	#	Name	Height	Weight	Year	Previous school	Hometown
G	0	Kobi Williams	6 ft 4 in (1.93 m)	195 lb (88 kg)	Jr	Truman State	St. Louis, Missouri
G	1	Trey Williams Jr.	6 ft 3 in (1.91 m)	180 lb (82 kg)	Fr	Vashon HS	Centralia, Illinois
G	2	Tyrique Brooks	6 ft 4 in (1.93 m)	180 lb (82 kg)	So	Missouri Southern	Springfield, Missouri
F	3	Collin Clark	6 ft 7 in (2.01 m)	215 lb (98 kg)	Fr	Greenwood Laboratory School	Springfield, Missouri
G/F	4	Antwan Burnett	6 ft 5 in (1.96 m)	215 lb (98 kg)	Sr	Grambling State	Montgomery, Alabama
G	5	Melakih Cunningham	6 ft 7 in (2.01 m)	196 lb (89 kg)	Fr	Moravian Prep (NC)	Gary, Indiana
G	6	Logan Epes	6 ft 3 in (1.91 m)	195 lb (88 kg)	Sr	Midwestern State	Garland, Texas
G/F	7	Amar Kuljuhovic	6 ft 8 in (2.03 m)	240 lb (109 kg)	Sr	North Dakota	Waterloo, Iowa
F	10	Darrion Sutton	6 ft 9 in (2.06 m)	205 lb (93 kg)	So	Georgia Tech	St. Charles, Missouri
F	11	Keith Palek III	6 ft 9 in (2.06 m)	220 lb (100 kg)	Sr	California (PA)	Woodbine, New Jersey
G	13	Zaxton King	6 ft 3 in (1.91 m)	185 lb (84 kg)	So	Lawrence HS	Lawrence, Kansas
F	20	Cameron Boone	6 ft 10 in (2.08 m)	240 lb (109 kg)	Jr	John A. Logan College	East St. Louis, Illinois
F	23	Michael Osei-Bonsu	6 ft 4 in (1.93 m)	280 lb (127 kg)	Sr	Vincennes	Bolingbrook, Illinois
G	31	Ryder Cheesman	6 ft 4 in (1.93 m)	177 lb (80 kg)	Fr	Camberwell Grammar School	Melbourne, Australia

Head coach

- Cuonzo Martin (Purdue)

Assistant coach(es)

- Tarrance Crump (Purdue)
- Dr. Carson Cunningham (Purdue)
- Marco Harris (Southwestern Oklahoma State)
- Steve Woodberry (Kansas)

Legend

- (C) Team captain
- (S) Suspended
- (I) Ineligible
- (W) Walk-on
- Injured
- Current redshirt

Roster
Last update: October 1, 2025

== Schedule and results ==
Date time, TV	Rank^{#}	Opponent^{#}	Result	Record	Site (attendance) city, state
Exhibition Season
October 31, 2025*; 6:00 p.m.		Maryville	W 92–67		Great Southern Bank Arena (1,184); Springfield, MO
Regular Season
November 4, 2025*; 7:00 p.m., ESPN+		Missouri Southern	W 88–70	1–0	Great Southern Bank Arena (1,929); Springfield, MO
November 8, 2025*; 7:00 p.m., ESPN+		Northwestern Oklahoma State	W 106–57	2–0	Great Southern Bank Arena (1,803); Springfield, MO
November 11, 2025*; 7:00 p.m., ESPN+		Arkansas State	L 85–86	2–1	Great Southern Bank Arena (2,201); Springfield, MO
November 15, 2025*; 5:00 p.m., ESPN+		at UT Arlington	L 49–67	2–2	College Park Center (2,934); Arlington, TX
November 22, 2025*; 4:00 p.m., ESPN+		UT Rio Grande Valley; Illinois Showcase	W 74–67	3–2	Great Southern Bank Arena (1,574); Springfield, MO
November 24, 2025*; 7:00 p.m., ESPN+		LIU; Illinois Showcase	L 61–75	3–3	Great Southern Bank Arena (1,601); Springfield, MO
November 30, 2025*; 2:00 p.m., ESPN+		Northeastern State	W 92−71	4−3	Great Southern Bank Arena (1,709); Springfield, MO
December 6, 2025*; 2:00 p.m., ESPN+		at Tulsa	L 74−98	4−4	Reynolds Center (2,979); Tulsa, OK
December 12, 2025; 6:00 p.m., TruTV		at Xavier	L 57–75	4–5	Cintas Center (9,112); Cincinnati, OH
December 16, 2025*; 7:00 p.m., ESPN+		Oral Roberts	W 63–62	5–5	Great Southern Bank Arena (1,581); Springfield, MO
December 23, 2025*; 2:00 p.m., ESPN+		Lindenwood	W 70–65	6–5	Great Southern Bank Arena (1,286); Springfield, MO
C-USA regular season
December 29, 2025; 1:00 p.m., ESPN+		at Delaware	W 61–43	7–5 (1–0)	Bob Carpenter Center (1,818); Newark, DE
January 2, 2026; 7:00 p.m., ESPN+		UTEP	W 79–55	8–5 (2–0)	Great Southern Bank Arena (1,846); Springfield, MO
January 4, 2026; 2:00 p.m., ESPN+		New Mexico State	W 89–82	9–5 (3–0)	Great Southern Bank Arena (2,075); Springfield, MO
January 7, 2026; 6:00 p.m., ESPN+		at Kennesaw State	L 80–90	9–6 (3–1)	Convocation Center (1,235); Kennesaw, GA
January 10, 2026; 4:00 p.m., ESPN+		FIU	W 79–71	10–6 (4–1)	Great Southern Bank Arena (2,210); Springfield, MO
January 14, 2026; 6:30 p.m., ESPN+		at Western Kentucky	L 72–87	10–7 (4–2)	E. A. Diddle Arena (2,745); Bowling Green, KY
January 17, 2026; 5:00 p.m., ESPN+		at Middle Tennessee	L 87–90	10–8 (4–3)	Murphy Center (4,482); Murfreesboro, TN
January 22, 2026; 8:00 p.m., CBSSN		at New Mexico State	W 84–75	11–8 (5–3)	Pan American Center (5,664); Las Cruces, NM
January 24, 2026; 3:00 p.m., ESPN+		at UTEP	W 62–57	12–8 (6–3)	Don Haskins Center (3,788); El Paso, TX
January 28, 2026; 7:00 p.m., ESPN+		Sam Houston	L 71–80	12–9 (6–4)	Great Southern Bank Arena (2,316); Springfield, MO
January 31, 2026; 2:00 p.m., ESPN+		Jacksonville State	W 74–67	13–9 (7–4)	Great Southern Bank Arena (2,634); Springfield, MO
February 7, 2026; 1:00 p.m., CBSSN		at Liberty	L 76-79	13–10 (7–5)	Liberty Arena (3,991); Lynchburg, VA
February 12, 2026; 7:30 p.m., CBSSN		Louisiana Tech	L 78–79 ^{2OT}	13–11 (7–6)	Great Southern Bank Arena (2,079); Springfield, MO
February 14, 2026; 2:00 p.m., ESPN+		Delaware	L 67–76	13–12 (7–7)	Great Southern Bank Arena (2,157); Springfield, MO
February 18, 2026; 7:00 p.m., ESPN+		Kennesaw State	L 87–91	13–13 (7–8)	Great Southern Bank Arena (2,070); Springfield, MO
February 21, 2026; 2:00 p.m., ESPN+		at FIU	L 67–70	13–14 (7–9)	Ocean Bank Convocation Center (647); Miami, FL
February 26, 2026; 6:30 p.m., ESPN+		at Louisiana Tech	L 70–72	13–15 (7–10)	Thomas Assembly Center (2,051); Ruston, LA
February 28, 2026; 4:30 p.m., ESPN+		at Sam Houston	L 81–86	13–16 (7–11)	Bernard Johnson Coliseum (2,502); Huntsville, TX
March 5, 2026; 7:00 p.m., ESPN+		Western Kentucky	W 87–74	14–16 (8–11)	Great Southern Bank Arena (2,159); Springfield, MO
March 7, 2026; 2:00 p.m., ESPN+		Middle Tennessee	L 63–75	14–17 (8–12)	Great Southern Bank Arena (2,578); Springfield, MO
C-USA Tournament
March 10, 2026; 5:30 p.m., ESPN+	(9)	vs. (8) FIU; First Round	W 75–72	15–17	Propst Arena (2,509); Huntsville, AL
March 11, 2026; 5:30 p.m., ESPN+	(9)	vs. (1) Liberty; Quarterfinals	W 77–69	16–17	Propst Arena (3,233); Huntsville, AL
March 13, 2026; 11:30 a.m., CBSSN	(9)	vs. (4) Louisiana Tech; Semifinals	L 66–69	16–18	Propst Arena (2,187); Huntsville, AL
*Non-conference game. ^{#}Rankings from AP Poll. (#) Tournament seedings in parentheses. All times are in Central.
