= 2025–26 FIU Panthers men's basketball team =

American college basketball season

2025–26 FIU Panthers men's basketball
- Conference: Conference USA
- Record: 15–17 (8–12 C-USA)
- Head coach: Jeremy Ballard (8th season)
- Associate head coach: Jesse Bopp
- Assistant coaches: Joey Rodriguez; Zavier Anderson
- Home arena: Ocean Bank Convocation Center

2025–26 Conference USA men's basketball standings
	Conf.				Overall
Team	W		L	PCT	W		L	PCT
Liberty	17	–	3	.850	26	–	8	.765
Sam Houston	13	–	7	.650	22	–	12	.647
Western Kentucky	11	–	9	.550	18	–	14	.563
Louisiana Tech	11	–	9	.550	20	–	14	.588
Middle Tennessee	11	–	9	.550	17	–	15	.531
Kennesaw State †	10	–	10	.500	21	–	14	.600
Jacksonville State	10	–	10	.500	15	–	17	.469
FIU	8	–	12	.400	15	–	17	.469
Missouri State	8	–	12	.400	16	–	18	.471
New Mexico State	8	–	12	.400	16	–	16	.500
UTEP	7	–	13	.350	11	–	20	.355
Delaware	6	–	14	.300	10	–	21	.323
† 2026 CUSA tournament winner

The 2025–26 FIU Panthers men's basketball team represented Florida International University during the 2025–26 NCAA Division I men's basketball season. The Panthers, led by eighth-year head coach Jeremy Ballard, played their home games at Ocean Bank Convocation Center in Miami, Florida as members of Conference USA.

== Previous season ==
The Panthers finished the 2024–25 season 10–23, 3–15 in C-USA play, to finish in tenth (last) place. They upset Western Kentucky, before falling to Jacksonville State in the quarterfinals of the C-USA tournament.

== Preseason ==
On October 9, 2025, Conference USA released their preseason poll. FIU was picked to finish tenth in the conference.

=== Preseason rankings ===
C-USA Preseason Poll
Place	Team	Votes
1	Liberty	143 (11)
2	Kennesaw State	126 (1)
3	New Mexico State	113
4	Middle Tennessee	103
5	Louisiana Tech	82
6	Western Kentucky	79
7	Jacksonville State	67
8	UTEP	66
9	Sam Houston	56
10	FIU	36
11	Delaware	35
12	Missouri State	30
(#) first-place votes

=== Preseason All-Conference USA Team ===
No players were named to the Preseason All-Conference USA Team.

=== Postseason Awards ===
Forward Corey Stephenson was named to the All-Conference USA Second Team, while freshman forward Eric Dibami brought home All-Freshman and All-Defensive Team honors.

== Roster ==
2025–26 FIU Panthers men's basketball team
Players
Coaches

Pos.	#	Name	Height	Weight	Year	Previous school	Hometown
F	0	Mikey Kelvin II	6 ft 9 in (2.06 m)	220 lb (100 kg)	RS Sr	Oklahoma State	Ottawa, Ontario
G	1	Brit Harris	6 ft 5 in (1.96 m)	185 lb (84 kg)	Sr	USC Upstate	Gary, Indiana
G	2	Zawdie Jackson	6 ft 0 in (1.83 m)	165 lb (75 kg)	Sr	New Mexico State	Stone Mountain, Georgia
G/F	3	Corey Stephenson	6 ft 6 in (1.98 m)	220 lb (100 kg)	Sr	Cal State Bakersfield	Bessemer, Alabama
G	4	Ashton Williamson	6 ft 3 in (1.91 m)	170 lb (77 kg)	So	21st Century Charter School of Gary	Gary, Indiana
F	5	Hamed Olayinka	6 ft 9 in (2.06 m)	215 lb (98 kg)	Sr	Samford	Los Angeles, California
G	6	Thiago Sucatzky	5 ft 10 in (1.78 m)	190 lb (86 kg)	Fr	Miami Prep	Córdoba, Argentina
F	7	Gvidas Gicevicius	6 ft 8 in (2.03 m)	185 lb (84 kg)	Jr	BC Žalgiris-2	Kaunas, Lithuania
F	9	Eric Dibami	6 ft 10 in (2.08 m)	235 lb (107 kg)	Fr	Miami Prep	Yaoundé, Cameroon
G	10	Julian Mackey	6 ft 2 in (1.88 m)	160 lb (73 kg)	Sr	Houston Christian	Grayson, Georgia
G	11	Amarion Nimmers	6 ft 3 in (1.91 m)	185 lb (84 kg)	RS Jr	Tampa	Rock Island, Illinois
G	15	Renato Ruiz (W)	6 ft 1 in (1.85 m)	185 lb (84 kg)	GS	American Heritage Schools	Plantation, Florida
F	22	Jorge Santos	6 ft 6 in (1.98 m)	230 lb (104 kg)	RS Sr	G. Holmes Braddock High School	Miami, Florida
F	25	Kennedy Brown (5th)	6 ft 8 in (2.03 m)	225 lb (102 kg)	Sr	Roosevelt	Chicago, Illinois
F	34	Ibrahim Olajuwon	6 ft 10 in (2.08 m)	210 lb (95 kg)	RS Jr	Southeastern Community College	Lagos, Nigeria

Head coach

- Jeremy Ballard (Colgate)

Assistant coach(es)

- Jesse Bopp (Plymouth State)
- Joey Rodriguez (VCU)
- Zavier Anderson (Clemson)

Legend

- (C) Team captain
- (S) Suspended
- (I) Ineligible
- (W) Walk-on
- (5th) Fifth-year senior
- Injured
- Current redshirt

Roster
Last update: December 6, 2025

== Schedule and results ==
Date time, TV	Rank^{#}	Opponent^{#}	Result	Record	High points	High rebounds	High assists	Site (attendance) city, state
Non-conference regular season
November 3, 2025*; 7:00 pm, ESPN+		Florida National	W 101–49	1–0	25 – Olayinka	12 – Olayinka	8 – Sucatzky	Ocean Bank Convocation Center (1,605); Miami, FL
November 8, 2025*; 1:00 pm, B1G+		at Nebraska	L 66–96	1–1	12 – Tied	7 – Tied	4 – Jackson	Pinnacle Bank Arena (14,023); Lincoln, NE
November 13, 2025*; 8:00 pm, SECN+		at LSU	L 81–98	1–2	25 – Stephenson	10 – Stephenson	6 – Stephenson	Pete Maravich Assembly Center (6,306); Baton Rouge, LA
November 18, 2025*; 7:00 pm, ESPN+		Fort Lauderdale	W 104−80	2−2	19 – Williamson	11 – Stephenson	9 – Mackey	Ocean Bank Convocation Center (723); Miami, FL
November 24, 2025*; 7:00 pm, ESPN+		James Madison; FIU MTE	L 72−80	2−3	25 – Stephenson	8 – Tied	5 – Jackson	Ocean Bank Convocation Center (604); Miami, FL
November 26, 2025*; 2:00 pm, ESPN+		Omaha; FIU MTE	W 74–61	3–3	24 – Harris	9 – Stephenson	4 – Tied	Ocean Bank Convocation Center (328); Miami, FL
December 3, 2025*; 7:00 pm, ESPN+		Florida Gulf Coast	W 89–83	4–3	20 – Jackson	8 – Stephenson	4 – Mackey	Ocean Bank Convocation Center (633); Miami, FL
December 6, 2025*; 2:00 pm, ESPN+		Jacksonville	W 88–65	5–3	14 – Tied	6 – Tied	6 – Jackson	Ocean Bank Convocation Center (338); Miami, FL
December 16, 2025*; 7:00 pm, ACCNX		at Miami (FL)	L 81–98	5–4	23 – Stephenson	5 – Tied	6 – Stephenson	Watsco Center (4,930); Coral Gables, FL
December 20, 2025*; 5:00 pm, ESPN+		LIU	W 86–79	6–4	22 – Mackey	7 – Dibami	5 – Williamson	Ocean Bank Convocation Center (301); Miami, FL
December 22, 2025*; 12:00 pm, ESPN+		Trinity (Jacksonville)	W 121–70	7–4	19 – Stephenson	12 – Dibami	9 – Williamson	Ocean Bank Convocation Center (194); Miami, FL
Conference USA regular season
December 28, 2025; 2:00 pm, ESPN+		Liberty	L 94–97 ^{OT}	7–5 (0–1)	21 – Dibami	11 – Stephenson	4 – Jackson	Ocean Bank Convocation Center (399); Miami, FL
January 2, 2026; 12:00 pm, ESPN+		New Mexico State	W 89–74	8–5 (1–1)	21 – Stephenson	10 – Dibami	4 – Jackson	Ocean Bank Convocation Center (431); Miami, FL
January 4, 2026; 4:00 pm, ESPN+		UTEP	W 76–64	9–5 (2–1)	17 – Stephenson	10 – Tied	3 – Tied	Ocean Bank Convocation Center (323); Miami, FL
January 7, 2026; 7:00 pm, ESPN+		at Jacksonville State	L 64–71	9–6 (2–2)	19 – Jackson	7 – Olayinka	4 – Williamson	Pete Mathews Coliseum (823); Jacksonville, AL
January 10, 2026; 5:00 pm, ESPN+		at Missouri State	L 71–79	9–7 (2–3)	18 – Mackey	8 – Dibami	5 – Jackson	Great Southern Bank Arena (2,210); Springfield, MO
January 14, 2026; 7:00 pm, ESPN+		at Kennesaw State	L 86–89	9–8 (2–4)	25 – Jackson	12 – Dibami	3 – Tied	VyStar Arena (1,908); Kennesaw, GA
January 17, 2026; 2:00 pm, ESPN+		Sam Houston	L 63–76	9–9 (2–5)	23 – Mackey	10 – Olayinka	3 – Tied	Ocean Bank Convocation Center (432); Miami, FL
January 22, 2026; 9:00 pm, ESPN+		at UTEP	L 77–83	9–10 (2–6)	19 – Olayinka	14 – Olayinka	3 – Tied	Don Haskins Center (3,186); El Paso, TX
January 24, 2026; 2:00 pm, ESPN+		at New Mexico State	W 81–78	10–10 (3–6)	25 – Stephenson	12 – Stephenson	4 – Sucatzky	Pan American Center (5,682); Las Cruces, NM
January 28, 2026; 7:00 pm, ESPN+		Jacksonville State	L 74–78	10–11 (3–7)	20 – Stephenson	10 – Dibami	2 – Mackey	Ocean Bank Convocation Center (1,124); Miami, FL
February 4, 2026; 7:30 pm, ESPN+		at Middle Tennessee	W 88–84 ^{OT}	11–11 (4–7)	34 – Stephenson	10 – Dibami	3 – Dibami	Murphy Center (3,512); Murfreesboro, TN
February 7, 2026; 3:00 pm, ESPN+		at Western Kentucky	L 70–80	11–12 (4–8)	17 – Jackson	6 – Tied	5 – Harris	E. A. Diddle Arena (3,145); Bowling Green, KY
February 12, 2026; 7:00 pm, ESPN+		Delaware	L 66–68	11–13 (4–9)	15 – Dibami	13 – Dibami	3 – Tied	Ocean Bank Convocation Center (540); Miami, FL
February 14, 2026; 2:00 pm, ESPN+		Louisiana Tech	W 77–64	12–13 (5–9)	20 – Jackson	17 – Olayinka	4 – Jackson	Ocean Bank Convocation Center; Miami, FL
February 19, 2026; 6:00 pm, CBSSN		at Liberty	L 89–90 ^{OT}	12–14 (5–10)	23 – Stephenson	10 – Dibami	3 – Jackson	Liberty Arena (3,553); Lynchburg, VA
February 21, 2026; 3:00 pm, ESPN+		Missouri State	W 70–67	13–14 (6–10)	22 – Mackey	8 – Olayinka	3 – Tied	Ocean Bank Convocation Center (647); Miami, FL
February 26, 2026; 9:00 pm, CBSSN		at Sam Houston	L 67–100	13–15 (6–11)	18 – Stephenson	8 – Dibami	2 – Tied	Bernard Johnson Coliseum (1,358); Huntsville, TX
February 28, 2026; 3:00 pm, ESPN+		at Louisiana Tech	W 84–76	14–15 (7–11)	21 – Stephenson	10 – Dibami	6 – Dibami	Thomas Assembly Center (2,265); Ruston, LA
March 5, 2026; 7:00 pm, ESPN+		Middle Tennessee	L 67–73	14–16 (7–12)	16 – Mackey	9 – Olayinka	6 – Jackson	Ocean Bank Convocation Center (1,735); Miami, FL
March 7, 2026; 2:00 pm, ESPN+		Western Kentucky	W 92–67	15–16 (8–12)	18 – Stephenson	10 – Olayinka	4 – Harris	Ocean Bank Convocation Center (804); Miami, FL
Conference USA tournament
March 10, 2026; 6:30 p.m., ESPN+	(8)	vs. (9) Missouri State; First round	L 72–75	15–17	24 – Stephenson	13 – Dibami	2 – Tied	Propst Arena (2,509); Huntsville, AL
*Non-conference game. ^{#}Rankings from AP Poll. (#) Tournament seedings in parentheses. All times are in Eastern.
