= Simeon Cottle =

American basketball player (born 2004)

Personal information
- Born: June 2, 2004 (age 22)
- Listed height: 6 ft 2 in (1.88 m)
- Listed weight: 175 lb (79 kg)

Career information
- High school: Tri-Cities (East Point, Georgia)
- College: Kennesaw State (2022–2026)
- Position: Guard

Career highlights
- Second-team All-Conference USA (2025)

Simeon Cottle (born June 2, 2004) is an American former college basketball player for the Kennesaw State Owls.

== High school ==
Cottle attended Tri-Cities High School in East Point, Georgia, where he played basketball. During his junior year, Cottle was named as an honorable mention for the GHSA All-5A and All-Atlanta/South Fulton basketball team. In his senior season, Cottle led Tri-Cities through the 5A playoffs, where in the quarterfinals, Cottle scored 42 points and went 18 of 18 at the free throw line in an overtime win against Chapel Hill High School. Later, Cottle helped Tri-Cities win the 5A State Championship, scoring 16 points and making 5 free throws in the final minute of the game to secure a win against Eagle's Landing Christian Academy. Following the season, Cottle was named the player of the year in both the Atlanta/South Fulton area and the 5A classification by the Atlanta Journal-Constitution. Additionally, Cottle was named to the second-team All-Georgia boys basketball team by SBLive. Cottle was also selected to play in the Georgia high school all-star basketball game after the season. While in high school, Cottle committed to play college basketball for Kennesaw State University.

== College career ==
In his freshman year, Cottle averaged 3.9 points per game, being a part of a team that made the 2023 NCAA tournament, where he contributed 7 points in Kennesaw State's loss in the Round of 64 against Xavier.

Cottle's performance greatly improved in his sophomore year. On December 2, Cottle had a then-career-high 27 points in a win against Georgia State. The following game, Cottle made a game-winning three point buzzer beater in a win against UNC Asheville. Cottle had his then ASUN career-high in points on January 18, scoring 25 in a loss against North Florida. In what would be Kennesaw State's last game of the season, Cottle had a season-high in points, scoring 29 in a loss in the first round of the 2024 ASUN tournament against Jacksonville.

On December 29, 2024, Cottle set a new career-high in points, scoring 32 in a win against Brewton–Parker. Cottle set a then-career-high in points in a conference game on February 6, scoring 30 in a win against Western Kentucky. Cottle tied his career-high in points in the quarterfinal round of the 2025 Conference USA tournament, scoring 32 again against New Mexico State, helping Kennesaw State achieve their first Conference USA tournament win in program history. Following the season, Cottle was named to the second-team All-CUSA men's basketball team.

Before his senior season, Cottle was selected as the preseason Conference USA Player of the Year. On November 26, Cottle set a new career-high in points, scoring 33 in an overtime win against Florida Gulf Coast. Following that performance, in addition to scoring 15 points against Oral Roberts and 25 points against Rice, Cottle was named both the Conference USA Player of the Week and one of five National Players of the Week by the U.S. Basketball Writers Association. On January 7, Cottle scored 25 points, along with notching 11 assists, registering his first double-double of his collegiate career in a win against Missouri State. The following game, Cottle scored 28 points and set the record for the most three-pointers by a Kennesaw State player in their career, in a win against Jacksonville State. For his efforts in both games, Cottle was again named Conference USA Player of the Week.

=== College statistics ===
Legend
GP	Games played	GS	Games started	MPG	Minutes per game
FG%	Field goal percentage	3P%	3-point field goal percentage	FT%	Free throw percentage
RPG	Rebounds per game	APG	Assists per game	SPG	Steals per game
BPG	Blocks per game	PPG	Points per game	**Bold**	Career high

Year	Team	GP	GS	MPG	FG%	3P%	FT%	RPG	APG	SPG	BPG	PPG
2022–23	Kennesaw State	**33**	0	10.3	**.423**	**.380**	.767	.7	1.1	.5	.0	3.9
2023–24	Kennesaw State	31	26	29.7	.420	.341	.737	**3.2**	2.5	1.4	.1	15.6
2024–25	Kennesaw State	**33**	**33**	**31.7**	.384	.319	**.876**	2.4	3.0	.8	**.2**	18.0
2025–26	Kennesaw State	17	17	30.4	.411	.377	**.876**	2.5	**3.8**	**1.5**	**.2**	**20.2**
Career		114	76	24.8	.404	.342	.835	2.1	2.4	1.0	.1	13.6

== Indictment ==
In January 2026, Cottle was one of many college basketball players to be named in a federal indictment involving sports betting and a point-shaving scheme. According to the indictment, Cottle was allegedly contacted by former NBA player Antonio Blakeney about participating in a sports betting conspiracy. Cottle is then accused of recruiting then-current Kennesaw State player Demond Robinson and another unnamed individual. Prior to a game against Queens on March 1, 2024, Cottle was supposedly texted by another alleged fixer, Jalen Smith, that he needed to FaceTime Cottle before the game, and that the latter would be in attendance at the game with money for Cottle, Robinson, and the unnamed third player. Cottle and the two other players were allegedly told to underperform to allow Queens to cover the first-half spread of –1.5. Queens outscored Kennesaw State 52 to 39 in the first half, with Cottle scoring 0 points in the first half compared to 13 in the second half. In the following days, Cottle was allegedly given his bribe payment by Smith on campus at Kennesaw State, totalling $40,000 in cash. Cottle and Smith were also accused of attempting to continue working together after the Queens game, with Cottle trying to recruit other Kennesaw State players and Smith offering to show them $200,000 to persuade them, but Cottle supposedly told Smith that no players were interested in the deal. Cottle is facing federal charges of bribery in sporting contests, aiding and abetting, and conspiracy to commit wire fraud, and also has been suspended indefinitely from the Kennesaw State basketball team.
