= 2024–25 FIU Panthers men's basketball team =

American college basketball season

2024–25 FIU Panthers men's basketball
- Conference: Conference USA
- Record: 10–23 (3–15 C-USA)
- Head coach: Jeremy Ballard (7th season)
- Associate head coach: Jesse Bopp
- Assistant coaches: Joey Rodriguez; Zavier Anderson
- Home arena: Ocean Bank Convocation Center

2024–25 Conference USA men's basketball standings
	Conf.				Overall
Team	W		L	PCT	W		L	PCT
Liberty †	13	–	5	.722	28	–	7	.800
Jacksonville State	12	–	6	.667	23	–	13	.639
Middle Tennessee	12	–	6	.667	22	–	12	.647
Kennesaw State	10	–	8	.556	19	–	14	.576
New Mexico State	10	–	8	.556	17	–	15	.531
Louisiana Tech	9	–	9	.500	20	–	12	.625
Western Kentucky	8	–	10	.444	17	–	15	.531
UTEP	7	–	11	.389	18	–	15	.545
Sam Houston	6	–	12	.333	13	–	19	.406
FIU	3	–	15	.167	10	–	23	.303
† 2025 CUSA tournament winner

The 2024–25 FIU Panthers men's basketball team represented Florida International University in the 2024–25 NCAA Division I men's basketball season. The Panthers, led by seventh-year head coach Jeremy Ballard, played their home games at Ocean Bank Convocation Center in Miami, Florida as members of Conference USA (C-USA).

== Previous season ==
The Panthers finished the 2023–24 season 11–22, 5–11 in C-USA play, to finish in last place. As a No. 9 seed, they defeat Jacksonville State in the first round of the C-USA tournament before losing to Sam Houston.

== Offseason ==
=== Departures ===
Name	Number	Pos.	Height	Weight	Year	Hometown	Reason for departure
Arturo Dean	2	G	5' 11"	163	Sophomore	Miami, FL	Transferred to Oklahoma State
Javaunte Hawkins	3	G	5' 11"	160	Senior	Lee's Summit, MO	Graduated
Seth Pinkney	4	C	7'1"	200	Senior	Warminster, PA	Graduated
Petar Krivokapic	23	G	6' 4"	214	Junior	Budva, Montenegro	Transferred to Pacific
Mohamed Sanogo	33	F	6' 9"	200	Junior	Pittsfield, MA	Signed to play professionally in Spain with Córdoba CB

=== Incoming transfers ===
Name	Number	Pos.	Height	Weight	Year	Hometown	Previous school
Asim Jones	2	G	6' 2"		Junior	Paterson, NJ	College of Southern Idaho
Vianney Salatchoum	23	C	6' 10"		Junior	Yaoundé, Cameroon	Panola College
Olajuwon Ibrahim	34	C	6' 9"		Junior	Lagos, Nigeria	Southeastern CC

=== 2024 recruiting class ===
College recruiting information
Name	Hometown	School	Height	Weight	Commit date
Ashton Williamson #34 PG	Gary, IN	Calumet High School	6 ft 2 in (1.88 m)	175 lb (79 kg)	May 23, 2024
Ashton Williamson #34 PG	Recruit ratings: 247Sports: ESPN: (79)				
Kole Williams; SF	Dallas, TX	Carter High School	6 ft 4 in (1.93 m)	195 lb (88 kg)	May 24, 2024
Kole Williams; SF	Recruit ratings: 247Sports:				
Overall recruit ranking:
Note: In many cases, Scout, Rivals, 247Sports, On3, and ESPN may conflict in their listings of height and weight.; In these cases, the average was taken. ESPN grades are on a 100-point scale.; Sources: "2024 Team Ranking". Rivals.

== Roster ==
2024–25 FIU Panthers men's basketball team
Players
Coaches

Pos.	#	Name	Height	Weight	Year	Previous school	Hometown
F	0	Chris Okeke	6 ft 9 in (2.06 m)	235 lb (107 kg)	Sr	Lipscomb; Tallahassee CC	East Chicago, IN
G	1	Dashon Gittens	6 ft 3 in (1.91 m)	180 lb (82 kg)	Jr	Putnam Science Academy	Hartford, CT
G	2	Asim Jones	6 ft 2 in (1.88 m)	170 lb (77 kg)	Jr	Paterson Charter; College of Southern Idaho	Paterson, NJ
G	3	Ashton Williamson	6 ft 2 in (1.88 m)	170 lb (77 kg)	Fr	21st Century Charter	Gary, IN
G	5	Jaidon Lipscomb	6 ft 5 in (1.96 m)	170 lb (77 kg)	Sr	Dohn Community High School; Lakeland CC	Columbus, OH
G	10	Travis Gray	6 ft 7 in (2.01 m)	195 lb (88 kg)	Sr	Henninger HS; Mohawk Valley CC	Syracuse, NY
G	11	Jayden Brewer	6 ft 6 in (1.98 m)	160 lb (73 kg)	Jr	Combine Academy	Indianapolis, IN
F	12	Dante Wilcox	6 ft 6 in (1.98 m)	220 lb (100 kg)	RS Sr	Oxbridge Academy	West Palm Beach, FL
G	15	Renato Ruiz (W)	6 ft 1 in (1.85 m)	185 lb (84 kg)	Sr	American Heritage HS	Plantation, FL
F	21	Jonathan Aybar	6 ft 9 in (2.06 m)	215 lb (98 kg)	Sr	Central Pointe Christian Academy; North Florida	Kissimmee, FL
G	22	Onyx Pastoriza (W)	5 ft 8 in (1.73 m)	150 lb (68 kg)	GS	Miami Triple Threat Prep	Arecibo, Puerto Rico
C	23	Vianney Salatchoum	6 ft 11 in (2.11 m)	225 lb (102 kg)	Jr	Panola College	Yaoundé, Cameroon
G	24	Jaden Grant (W)	5 ft 11 in (1.8 m)	170 lb (77 kg)	Sr	NSU University School	Davie, FL
G	25	Kole Williams	6 ft 4 in (1.93 m)	220 lb (100 kg)	Fr	Carter HS	Dallas, TX
G	31	George Jr. Pridgett	5 ft 10 in (1.78 m)	160 lb (73 kg)	Sr	Roswell HS; Polk State College	Boston, MA
F	34	Olajuwon Ibrahim	6 ft 10 in (2.08 m)	210 lb (95 kg)	Jr	Southeastern Community College	Lagos, Nigeria

Head coach

- Jeremy Ballard (Colgate)

Assistant coach(es)

- Jesse Bopp (Plymouth State)
- Joey Rodriguez (VCU)
- Zavier Anderson (Clemson)

Legend

- (C) Team captain
- (S) Suspended
- (I) Ineligible
- (W) Walk-on
- Injured
- Current redshirt

Roster

== Schedule and results ==
Date time, TV	Rank^{#}	Opponent^{#}	Result	Record	High points	High rebounds	High assists	Site (attendance) city, state
Non-conference regular season
November 5, 2024*; 7:00 p.m., ESPN+		at Rice	L 70–77	0–1	18 – 2 tied	9 – Brewer	4 – Brewer	Tudor Fieldhouse (1,111); Houston, TX
November 9, 2024*; 8:30 p.m., ESPN+		at Southern Utah; C-USA/WAC Alliance	L 75–80	0–2	22 – Brewer	7 – Brewer	5 – Williamson	America First Event Center (2,856); Cedar City, UT
November 14, 2024*; 7:00 p.m., ESPN+		Florida National	W 110–55	1–2	18 – Okeke	10 – Okeke	6 – Brewer	Ocean Bank Convocation Center (947); Miami, FL
November 18, 2024*; 7:00 p.m., ESPN+		Howard	L 70–75	1–3	15 – Brewer	6 – Williamson	8 – Williamson	Ocean Bank Convocation Center (764); Miami, FL
November 22, 2024*; 1:00 p.m.		vs. Northeastern; Homewood Suites Classic	L 58–60	1–4	14 – Salatchoum	7 – Aybar	3 – Jones	Alico Arena (57); Fort Myers, FL
November 23, 2024*; 11:00 a.m.		vs. Cal State Bakersfield; Homewood Suites Classic	W 76–73 ^{OT}	2–4	16 – Gittens	5 – Wilcox	3 – 2 tied	Alico Arena (742); Fort Myers, FL
November 24, 2024*; 3:00 p.m., ESPN+		at Florida Gulf Coast; Homewood Suites Classic	L 59–60	2–5	18 – Brewer	8 – 2 tied	2 – 2 tied	Alico Arena (1,601); Fort Myers, FL
December 4, 2024*; 6:30 p.m., CBSSN		Florida Atlantic	L 77–88	2–6	20 – Salatchoum	13 – Brewer	4 – Brewer	Ocean Bank Convocation Center (1,304); Miami, FL
December 6, 2024*; 7:00 p.m., ESPN+		New College of Florida	W 70–63	3–6	19 – Salatchoum	7 – 2 tied	4 – Brewer	Ocean Bank Convocation Center (567); Miami, FL
December 14, 2024*; 4:00 p.m., ESPN+		at Stetson	W 81–72	4–6	20 – Brewer	11 – Aybar	4 – 2 tied	Edmunds Center (508); DeLand, FL
December 17, 2024*; 7:00 p.m., ESPN+		at East Carolina	L 64–75	4–7	20 – Brewer	7 – Aybar	4 – 2 tied	Williams Arena (3,359); Greenville, NC
December 21, 2024*; 6:00 p.m., ESPN+		IU Indy	W 75–69	5–7	15 – 2 tied	5 – 2 tied	4 – 2 tied	Ocean Bank Convocation Center (595); Miami, FL
December 30, 2024*; 12:00 p.m., ESPN+		Utah Tech; C-USA/WAC Alliance	W 80–66	6–7	15 – Gray	5 – 2 tied	7 – Jones	Ocean Bank Convocation Center (613); Miami, FL
Conference USA regular season
January 2, 2025; 7:00 p.m., ESPN+		Middle Tennessee	L 69–73	6–8 (0–1)	21 – Salatchoum	6 – Aybar	5 – Jones	Ocean Bank Convocation Center (560); Miami, FL
January 4, 2025; 2:00 p.m., ESPN+		Western Kentucky	W 85–66	7–8 (1–1)	17 – Jones	7 – 2 tied	4 – Williamson	Ocean Bank Convocation Center (580); Miami, FL
January 9, 2025; 7:30 p.m., ESPN+		at Louisiana Tech	L 64–81	7–9 (1–2)	15 – 2 tied	4 – Gray	5 – Williamson	Thomas Assembly Center (1,635); Ruston, LA
January 11, 2025; 3:30 p.m., ESPN+		at Sam Houston	L 74–81	7–10 (1–3)	20 – Brewer	11 – Aybar	4 – Aybar	Bernard Johnson Coliseum (976); Huntsville, TX
January 16, 2025; 7:00 p.m., ESPN+		New Mexico State	L 52–59	7–11 (1–4)	13 – 2 tied	11 – Salatchoum	2 – 2 tied	Ocean Bank Convocation Center (1,535); Miami, FL
January 18, 2025; 2:00 p.m., ESPN+		UTEP	L 73–81	7–12 (1–5)	17 – Aybar	6 – 2 tied	5 – Williamson	Ocean Bank Convocation Center (649); Miami, FL
January 25, 2025; 6:00 p.m., ESPN+		Liberty	L 59–82	7–13 (1–6)	17 – Brewer	8 – 2 tied	2 – Gittens	Ocean Bank Convocation Center (1,176); Miami, FL
January 30, 2025; 7:00 p.m., ESPN+		at Jacksonville State	L 67–71	7–14 (1–7)	15 – Brewer	8 – Salatchoum	4 – Jones	Pete Mathews Coliseum (2,877); Jacksonville, AL
February 1, 2025; 5:00 p.m., ESPN+		at Kennesaw State	L 67–73	7–15 (1–8)	22 – Brewer	7 – Brewer	5 – Williamson	Convocation Center (2,155); Kennesaw, GA
February 6, 2025; 7:00 p.m., ESPN+		Sam Houston	W 85–82 ^{OT}	8–15 (2–8)	25 – Brewer	9 – Aybar	3 – 3 tied	Ocean Bank Convocation Center (1,002); Miami, FL
February 8, 2025; 2:00 p.m., ESPN+		Louisiana Tech	L 71–82	8–16 (2–9)	15 – Brewer	7 – Gittens	3 – 2 tied	Ocean Bank Convocation Center (745); Miami, FL
February 13, 2025; 9:00 p.m., ESPN+		at UTEP	L 63–77	8–17 (2–10)	12 – 2 tied	10 – Aybar	4 – Williamson	Don Haskins Center (4,089); El Paso, TX
February 15, 2025; 9:00 p.m., ESPN+		at New Mexico State	L 48–76	8–18 (2–11)	13 – Brewer	6 – 3 tied	2 – Aybar	Pan American Center (13,274); Las Cruces, NM
February 22, 2025; 2:00 p.m., ESPN+		at Liberty	L 45–58	8–19 (2–12)	10 – 2 tied	10 – Brewer	2 – 2 tied	Liberty Arena (4,000); Lynchburg, VA
February 27, 2025; 7:00 p.m., ESPN+		Kennesaw State	W 76–61	9–19 (3–12)	15 – 2 tied	6 – Salatchoum	3 – Wilcox	Ocean Bank Convocation Center (668); Miami, FL
March 1, 2025; 2:00 p.m., ESPN+		Jacksonville State	L 79–84 ^{2OT}	9–20 (3–13)	19 – Aybar	8 – Gittens	4 – Williamson	Ocean Bank Convocation Center (612); Miami, FL
March 6, 2025; 8:00 p.m., ESPN+		at Western Kentucky	L 67–76	9–21 (3–14)	21 – Salatchoum	7 – Brewer	4 – 2 tied	E. A. Diddle Arena (3,645); Bowling Green, KY
March 8, 2025; 3:00 p.m., ESPN+		at Middle Tennessee	L 56–78	9–22 (3–15)	15 – Brewer	7 – Brewer	2 – Williamson	Murphy Center (4,018); Murfreesboro, TN
Conference USA tournament
March 11, 2025; 9:00 p.m., ESPN+	(10)	vs. (7) Western Kentucky; First round	W 64–61	10–22	17 – 2 tied	10 – Salatchoum	4 – Williamson	Von Braun Center (1,244); Huntsville, AL
March 12, 2025; 9:00 p.m., ESPN+	(10)	vs. (2) Jacksonville State; Quarterfinals	L 56–65	10–23	18 – Brewer	6 – Aybar	4 – Williamson	Von Braun Center (2,562); Huntsville, AL
*Non-conference game. ^{#}Rankings from AP poll. (#) Tournament seedings in parentheses. All times are in Eastern.
