= 2024–25 Louisiana Tech Bulldogs basketball team =

American college basketball season

2024–25 Louisiana Tech Bulldogs basketball
- Conference: Conference USA
- Record: 20–12 (9–9 CUSA)
- Head coach: Talvin Hester (3rd season)
- Assistant coaches: Winston Hines; Darshawn McClellan; Tyson Batiste; Tim McGraw; Kavin Gilder-Tilbury
- Home arena: Thomas Assembly Center

2024–25 Conference USA men's basketball standings
	Conf.				Overall
Team	W		L	PCT	W		L	PCT
Liberty †	13	–	5	.722	28	–	7	.800
Jacksonville State	12	–	6	.667	23	–	13	.639
Middle Tennessee	12	–	6	.667	22	–	12	.647
Kennesaw State	10	–	8	.556	19	–	14	.576
New Mexico State	10	–	8	.556	17	–	15	.531
Louisiana Tech	9	–	9	.500	20	–	12	.625
Western Kentucky	8	–	10	.444	17	–	15	.531
UTEP	7	–	11	.389	18	–	15	.545
Sam Houston	6	–	12	.333	13	–	19	.406
FIU	3	–	15	.167	10	–	23	.303
† 2025 CUSA tournament winner

The 2024–25 Louisiana Tech Bulldogs basketball team represented Louisiana Tech University during the 2024–25 NCAA Division I men's basketball season. The team, led by third-year head coach Talvin Hester, played their home games at Thomas Assembly Center in Ruston, Louisiana as a members of Conference USA.

== Previous season ==
The Bulldogs finished the 2023–24 season 22–10, 12–4 in C-USA play to finish in second place. They lost in the quarterfinals to Middle Tennessee of the C-USA tournament.

== Offseason ==
=== Departures ===
Name	Number	Pos.	Height	Weight	Year	Hometown	Reason for departure
Tahlik Chavez	1	G	6'2"	160	(redshirt) Senior	Arlington, TX	Graduated
Dravon Mangum	2	F	6'8"	205	GS Senior	Roxboro, NC	Graduated
Tyler Henry	3	G	6'4"	186	Senior	Brooklyn, NY	Graduated
Jordan Turner	5	G/F	6'8"	195	(redshirt) Senior	Houston, TX	Graduate transferred to D'Youville
Jaylin Henderson	11	G	6'3"	175	Junior	Wichita, KS	Transferred to Portland State
Alex Vertus	21	G	6'3"	205	Junior	Coral Springs, CO	Left the team
Isaiah Crawford	22	F	6'6"	220	(redshirt) Senior	Fort Worth, TX	Graduated/undrafted in 2024 NBA draft; signed with the Sacramento Kings
Terri Miller Jr.	34	F	6'8"	250	Junior	Fresno, CA	Transferred to Portland State

=== Incoming transfers ===
Name	Number	Pos.	Height	Weight	Year	Hometown	Previous school
Amaree Abram	1	G	6'4"	195	Junior	Port Arthur, TX	Georgia Tech
William Jeffress	2	F	6'7"	205	(redshirt) Junior	Erie, PA	Pittsburgh
Al Green	5	G	6'3"	180	Junior	Elk Grove, CA	San Diego City College
Kaden Cooper	11	G	6'5"	190	Sophomore	Ada, OK	Oklahoma
Sean Elkinton	33	C	6'8"		Junior	Crosby, TX	St. Edward's

=== 2024 recruiting class ===
College recruiting information
Name	Hometown	School	Height	Weight	Commit date
A.J. Bates #36 SG	Katy, TX	Seven Lakes High School	6 ft 2 in (1.88 m)	180 lb (82 kg)	Jul 11, 2023
A.J. Bates #36 SG	Recruit ratings: Scout: Rivals: 247Sports: ESPN: (80)				
Landren Blocker #64 SF	Little Rock, AR	Little Rock Christian Academy	6 ft 5 in (1.96 m)	200 lb (91 kg)	Nov 10, 2023
Landren Blocker #64 SF	Recruit ratings: Scout: Rivals: 247Sports: ESPN: (N/A)				
Overall recruit ranking:
Note: In many cases, Scout, Rivals, 247Sports, On3, and ESPN may conflict in their listings of height and weight.; In these cases, the average was taken. ESPN grades are on a 100-point scale.; Sources: "2024 Team Ranking". Rivals.

=== 2025 recruiting class ===
College recruiting information (2025)
Name	Hometown	School	Height	Weight	Commit date
Jaylen Fenner; SF	Humble, TX	Atascocita High School	6 ft 4 in (1.93 m)	185 lb (84 kg)	Oct 3, 2024
Jaylen Fenner; SF	Recruit ratings: Scout: Rivals: 247Sports: ESPN: (N/A)				
Overall recruit ranking:
Note: In many cases, Scout, Rivals, 247Sports, On3, and ESPN may conflict in their listings of height and weight.; In these cases, the average was taken. ESPN grades are on a 100-point scale.; Sources: "2025 Team Ranking". Rivals.

== Roster ==
2024–25 Louisiana Tech Bulldogs men's basketball team
Players
Coaches

Pos.	#	Name	Height	Weight	Year	Previous school	Hometown
G	0	Devin Ree	6 ft 8 in (2.03 m)	190 lb (86 kg)	Jr	Oak Hill Academy (VA); Louisville	Jackson, MS
G	1	Amaree Abram	6 ft 4 in (1.93 m)	195 lb (88 kg)	Jr	Southern California Academy; Georgia Tech	Port Arthur, TX
F	2	William Jeffress	6 ft 7 in (2.01 m)	210 lb (95 kg)	RS Sr	McDowell HS; Pittsburgh	Erie, PA
G	3	AJ Bates	6 ft 3 in (1.91 m)	200 lb (91 kg)	Fr	Seven Lakes HS	Houston, TX
G	4	Sean Newman Jr.	6 ft 1 in (1.85 m)	165 lb (75 kg)	RS Jr	Culver City HS; Fullerton College	Los Angeles, CA
G	5	Al Green	6 ft 3 in (1.91 m)	185 lb (84 kg)	Jr	Franklin HS; San Diego City College	Sacramento, CA
G	7	Landren Blocker	6 ft 5 in (1.96 m)	210 lb (95 kg)	Fr	Little Rock Christian	Little Rock, AR
G	10	Ben Ponder (W)	6 ft 3 in (1.91 m)	200 lb (91 kg)	Sr	Calvary Baptist Academy	Shreveport, LA
G	11	Kaden Cooper	6 ft 5 in (1.96 m)	195 lb (88 kg)	So	The Skill Factory; Oklahoma	Ada, OK
F	13	Daniel Batcho	6 ft 11 in (2.11 m)	245 lb (111 kg)	RS Sr	Texas Tech	Paris, France
F	14	Will Allen	6 ft 7 in (2.01 m)	225 lb (102 kg)	RS Jr	Akfred Bonnabel HS	New Orleans, LA
G	20	Jordan Crawford	6 ft 3 in (1.91 m)	185 lb (84 kg)	Jr	Simsboro HS	Ruston, LA
F	33	Sean Elkinton	6 ft 8 in (2.03 m)	235 lb (107 kg)	Jr	Crosby HS; St. Edward's	Crosby, TX

Head coach

- Talvin Hester (Texas Wesleyan)

Assistant coach(es)

- Winston Hines (Stillman)
- Darshawn McClellan (Vanderbilt)
- Tyson Batiste (Central Connecticut State)
- Tim McGraw (John Brown)
- Kavin Gilder-Tilbury (Texas State)

Legend

- (C) Team captain
- (S) Suspended
- (I) Ineligible
- (W) Walk-on
- Injured
- Current redshirt

Roster

== Schedule and results ==
Date time, TV	Rank^{#}	Opponent^{#}	Result	Record	High points	High rebounds	High assists	Site (attendance) city, state
Non-conference regular season
November 4, 2024*; 6:30 p.m., ESPN+		LSU–Alexandria	W 77–50	1–0	17 – Cooper	9 – Cooper	8 – Newman Jr.	Thomas Assembly Center (2,050); Ruston, LA
November 9, 2024*; 5:00 p.m., ESPN+		UT Arlington; C-USA/WAC Alliance	W 92–77	2–0	28 – Batcho	10 – Jeffress	11 – Newman Jr.	College Park Center (3,195); Arlington, TX
November 13, 2024*; 5:00 p.m., MSG+		vs. UMass; Icons of the Game	W 76–66	3–0	19 – Abram	6 – Tied	12 – Newman Jr.	Nassau Coliseum; Uniondale, NY
November 18, 2024*; 6:30 p.m., ESPN+		Mississippi College	W 105–67	4–0	38 – Batcho	8 – Tied	14 – Newman Jr.	Thomas Assembly Center (1,582); Ruston, LA
November 25, 2024*; 2:00 p.m., FloSports		vs. Southern Illinois; Gulf Coast Showcase	W 85–79 ^{OT}	5–0	19 – Green	12 – Cooper	5 – Newman Jr.	Hertz Arena (613); Estero, FL
November 26, 2024*; 2:00 p.m., FloSports		vs. Richmond; Gulf Coast Showcase	W 65–62	6–0	16 – Cooper	9 – Tied	8 – Newman Jr.	Hertz Arena (451); Estero, FL
November 27, 2024*; 11:00 a.m., FloSports		vs. Eastern Kentucky; Gulf Coast Showcase	W 78–69	7–0	19 – Batcho	10 – Cooper	4 – Newman Jr.	Hertz Arena (268); Estero, FL
November 30, 2024*; 10:30 a.m., ESPN+		Southern	L 70–73	7–1	22 – Batcho	9 – Ree	8 – Newman Jr.	Thomas Assembly Center (2,257); Ruston, LA
December 4, 2024*; 7:00 p.m., ESPN+		at No. 16 Memphis	L 71–81	7–2	18 – Green	9 – Cooper	11 – Newman Jr.	FedExForum (10,543); Memphis, TN
December 8, 2024*; 3:30 p.m., ESPN+		at Louisiana	W 69–58	8–2	19 – Batcho	11 – Batcho	7 – Newman Jr.	Cajundome (1,187); Lafayette, LA
December 13, 2024*; 6:30 p.m., ESPN+		Georgia Southern	W 77–63	9–2	25 – Cooper	8 – Tied	11 – Newman Jr.	Thomas Assembly Center (1,831); Ruston, LA
December 16, 2024*; 6:30 p.m., ESPN+		Grand Canyon; C-USA/WAC Alliance	W 74–66	10–2	25 – Newman Jr.	9 – Cooper	9 – Newman Jr.	Thomas Assembly Center (2,173); Ruston, LA
December 21, 2024*; 3:00 p.m., ESPN+		Rust	W 108–60	11–2	27 – Batcho	11 – Tied	20 – Newman Jr.	Thomas Assembly Center; Ruston, LA
Conference USA regular season
January 2, 2025; 8:00 p.m., ESPN+		at UTEP	L 60–70	11–3 (0–1)	14 – Cooper	8 – Batcho	7 – Newman Jr.	Don Haskins Center (4,692); El Paso, TX
January 4, 2025; 3:00 p.m., ESPN+		at New Mexico State	L 48–78	11–4 (0–2)	12 – Elkinton	4 – Tied	6 – Newman Jr.	Pan American Center (4,004); Las Cruces, NM
January 9, 2025; 6:30 p.m., ESPN+		FIU	W 81–64	12–4 (1–2)	21 – Green	8 – Cooper	13 – Newman Jr.	Thomas Assembly Center (1,635); Ruston, LA
January 11, 2025; 7:00 p.m., ESPNU		Liberty	W 79–74	13–4 (2–2)	27 – Newman Jr.	12 – Batcho	8 – Newman Jr.	Thomas Assembly Center (2,373); Ruston, LA
January 16, 2025; 6:00 p.m., ESPN+		at Jacksonville State	L 61–63	13–5 (2–3)	19 – Batcho	10 – Cooper	8 – Newman Jr.	Pete Mathews Coliseum (2,317); Jacksonville, AL
January 18, 2025; 4:00 p.m., ESPN+		at Kennesaw State	L 76–78	13–6 (2–4)	23 – Batcho	7 – Batcho	7 – Newman Jr.	Convocation Center (1,707); Kennesaw, GA
January 23, 2025; 6:00 p.m., CBSSN		Western Kentucky	W 77–67	14–6 (3–4)	18 – Batcho	9 – Crawford	5 – Newman Jr.	Thomas Assembly Center (1,894); Ruston, LA
January 25, 2025; 5:30 p.m., ESPNU		Middle Tennessee	W 75–69	15–6 (4–4)	25 – Batcho	13 – Cooper	8 – Newman Jr.	Thomas Assembly Center (2,414); Ruston, LA
February 1, 2025; 3:00 p.m., ESPNU		Sam Houston	W 66–61 ^{OT}	16–6 (5–4)	22 – Newman Jr.	10 – Batcho	8 – Newman Jr.	Thomas Assembly Center (3,141); Ruston, LA
February 6, 2025; 7:00 p.m., CBSSN		at Liberty	L 53–77	16–7 (5–5)	18 – Green	7 – Bates	6 – Newman Jr.	Liberty Arena (3,152); Lynchburg, VA
February 8, 2025; 1:00 p.m., ESPN+		at FIU	W 82–71	17–7 (6–5)	20 – Abram	8 – Ree	7 – Bates	Ocean Bank Convocation Center (745); Miami, FL
February 13, 2025; 6:30 p.m., ESPN+		Kennesaw State	L 47–69	17–8 (6–6)	11 – Green	5 – Green	4 – Newman Jr.	Thomas Assembly Center (1,814); Ruston, LA
February 15, 2025; 3:00 p.m., ESPN+		Jacksonville State	L 68–70	17–9 (6–7)	19 – Batcho	13 – Cooper	4 – Crawford	Thomas Assembly Center (3,140); Ruston, LA
February 20, 2025; 8:00 p.m., CBSSN		at Middle Tennessee	W 85–74	18–9 (7–7)	23 – Newman Jr.	11 – Cooper	6 – Newman Jr.	Murphy Center (3,505); Murfreesboro, TN
February 22, 2025; 7:00 p.m., ESPN+		at Western Kentucky	L 63–64	18–10 (7–8)	21 – Abram	7 – Crawford	5 – Newman Jr.	E. A. Diddle Arena (4,123); Bowling Green, KY
March 1, 2025; 2:30 p.m., ESPN+		at Sam Houston	W 90–66	19–10 (8–8)	20 – Bates	9 – Batcho	9 – Bates	Bernard Johnson Coliseum (1,438); Huntsville, TX
March 6, 2025; 6:30 p.m., ESPN+		New Mexico State	L 55–67	19–11 (8–9)	13 – Green	10 – Tied	5 – Newman Jr.	Thomas Assembly Center (1,659); Ruston, LA
March 8, 2025; 2:00 p.m., ESPN+		UTEP	W 76–58	20–11 (9–9)	20 – Green	13 – Cooper	5 – Newman Jr.	Thomas Assembly Center (1,955); Ruston, LA
Conference USA tournament
March 13, 2025; 8:00 p.m., ESPN+	(6)	vs. (3) Middle Tennessee; Quarterfinals	L 75–77 ^{2OT}	20–12	28 – Green	14 – Cooper	7 – Newman Jr.	Von Braun Center (3,108); Huntsville, AL
*Non-conference game. ^{#}Rankings from AP Poll. (#) Tournament seedings in parentheses. All times are in Central.

== See also ==
- 2024–25 Louisiana Tech Lady Techsters basketball team
