= 2024–25 Kennesaw State Owls men's basketball team =

American college basketball season

2024–25 Kennesaw State Owls men's basketball
- Conference: Conference USA
- Record: 19–14 (10–8 CUSA)
- Head coach: Antoine Pettway (2nd season)
- Associate head coach: Philip Pearson
- Assistant coaches: Donovan Kates; Willie Watson
- Home arena: Convocation Center

2024–25 Conference USA men's basketball standings
	Conf.				Overall
Team	W		L	PCT	W		L	PCT
Liberty †	13	–	5	.722	28	–	7	.800
Jacksonville State	12	–	6	.667	23	–	13	.639
Middle Tennessee	12	–	6	.667	22	–	12	.647
Kennesaw State	10	–	8	.556	19	–	14	.576
New Mexico State	10	–	8	.556	17	–	15	.531
Louisiana Tech	9	–	9	.500	20	–	12	.625
Western Kentucky	8	–	10	.444	17	–	15	.531
UTEP	7	–	11	.389	18	–	15	.545
Sam Houston	6	–	12	.333	13	–	19	.406
FIU	3	–	15	.167	10	–	23	.303
† 2025 CUSA tournament winner

The 2024–25 Kennesaw State Owls men's basketball team represented Kennesaw State University in the 2024–25 NCAA Division I men's basketball season. The Owls, led by second-year head coach Antoine Pettway, played their home games at the KSU Convocation Center near Kennesaw, Georgia in unincorporated Cobb County as first-year members of Conference USA.

== Previous season ==
The Owls finished the 2023–24 season 15–15, 6–10 in Atlantic Sun Conference (ASUN) play, to finish in ninth place. As the No. 9 seed in the ASUN tournament, they lost to Jacksonville in the first round.

== Offseason ==
=== Departures ===
Name	Number	Pos.	Height	Weight	Year	Hometown	Reason for departure
Demond Robinson	0	F	6'9"	235	Senior	Montgomery, AL	Graduated
Terrell Burden	1	G	5'10"	170	Senior	Smyrna, GA	Graduated
Jamal King	3	F	6'7"	205	Junior	Uniontown, AL	Transferred
Cole LaRue	4	F	6'9"	236	Senior	Mobile, AL	Graduated
Armani Harris	21	G	6'6"	215	(redshirt) Senior	Brooklyn, NY	Graduated
Marcus Whitlock	22	G	6'2"	170	Freshman	Monticello, GA	Transferred to Cowley College
Quincy Ademokoya	23	G	6'6"	170	Senior	Bloomington, IL	Transferred to South Florida
Jusaun Holt	24	G	6'7"	184	Junior	Tacoma, WA	Not on team roster
Matt Brown	30	G	6'5"	195	Junior	Stockbridge, GA	Walk-on; transferred

=== Incoming transfers ===
Name	Number	Pos.	Height	Weight	Year	Hometown	Previous school
Richardo Wright	1	G	6'3"	185	GS Senior	Eustis, FL	SMU
Andre Weir	3	C	6'10"	265	(redshirt) Senior	Hollywood, FL	Florida Gulf Coast

=== 2024 recruiting class ===
College recruiting information
Name	Hometown	School	Height	Weight	Commit date
Ramon Seals #67 SF	Tampa, FL	SLAM School	6 ft 4 in (1.93 m)	185 lb (84 kg)	Oct 6, 2023
Ramon Seals #67 SF	Recruit ratings: Rivals: ESPN: (78)				
Adrian Wooley; CG	Cottondale, AL	Paul W Bryant High School	6 ft 3 in (1.91 m)	155 lb (70 kg)	Nov 1, 2023
Adrian Wooley; CG	Recruit ratings: 247Sports:				
Braedan Lue; PF	Douglasville, GA	Alexander High School	6 ft 6 in (1.98 m)	195 lb (88 kg)	Nov 11, 2023
Braedan Lue; PF	Recruit ratings: No ratings found				
Mekhi Turner; PF	Atlanta, GA	Maynard Jackson High School	6 ft 8 in (2.03 m)	200 lb (91 kg)	Sep 1, 2023
Mekhi Turner; PF	Recruit ratings: No ratings found				
Ricky McKenzie; SG	Marietta, GA	Wheeler High School	6 ft 3 in (1.91 m)	185 lb (84 kg)	Jul 14, 2023
Ricky McKenzie; SG	Recruit ratings: No ratings found				
Jamil Miller; SG	Spokane, WA	Gonzaga Prep	6 ft 6 in (1.98 m)	N/A	Apr 25, 2024
Jamil Miller; SG	Recruit ratings: No ratings found				
Overall recruit ranking:
Note: In many cases, Scout, Rivals, 247Sports, On3, and ESPN may conflict in their listings of height and weight.; In these cases, the average was taken. ESPN grades are on a 100-point scale.; Sources: "2024 Team Ranking". Rivals.

== Roster ==
2024–25 Kennesaw State Owls men's basketball team
Players
Coaches

Pos.	#	Name	Height	Weight	Year	Previous school	Hometown
G	0	Ramone Seals	6 ft 6 in (1.98 m)	228 lb (103 kg)	Fr	SLAM Tampa	Tampa, FL
G	1	Ricardo Wright	6 ft 3 in (1.91 m)	185 lb (84 kg)	GS	SMU	Eustis, FL
G	2	RJ Johnson	6 ft 4 in (1.93 m)	225 lb (102 kg)	So	Grissom HS	Huntsville, AL
C	3	Andre Weir	6 ft 10 in (2.08 m)	265 lb (120 kg)	RS Sr	Florida Gulf Coast	Hollywood, FL
F	4	Mekhi Turner	6 ft 8 in (2.03 m)	214 lb (97 kg)	Fr	Maynard Jackson HS	Atlanta, GA
G	5	Simeon Cottle	6 ft 2 in (1.88 m)	165 lb (75 kg)	Jr	Tri-Cities HS	College Park, GA
F	6	Frankquon Sherman	6 ft 7 in (2.01 m)	215 lb (98 kg)	So	Grovetown HS	Lincolnton, GA
G	7	Chase Clemons	6 ft 0 in (1.83 m)	175 lb (79 kg)	So	Etowah HS	Woodstock, GA
G	8	Ricky McKenzie	6 ft 4 in (1.93 m)	186 lb (84 kg)	Fr	Wheeler HS	Marietta, GA
G	9	Eric Holland (W)	5 ft 8 in (1.73 m)	155 lb (70 kg)	Jr	Rome HS	Rome, GA
G	10	Jamil Miller	6 ft 6 in (1.98 m)	199 lb (90 kg)	Fr	Combine Academy (NC)	Spokane, WA
G	11	Delaney Heard	6 ft 3 in (1.91 m)	209 lb (95 kg)	GS	Alabama	Canton, GA
F	13	Braedan Lue	6 ft 8 in (2.03 m)	223 lb (101 kg)	Fr	Alexander HS	Douglasville, GA
G	14	Adrian Wooley	6 ft 5 in (1.96 m)	180 lb (82 kg)	Fr	Paul W. Bryant HS	Tuscaloosa, AL
F	25	Rongie Gordon	6 ft 8 in (2.03 m)	220 lb (100 kg)	GS	UAB	Montgomery, AL
F	30	Dozie Onyirimba (W)	6 ft 3 in (1.91 m)	196 lb (89 kg)	Fr	McEachern HS	Powder Springs, GA
G	31	Charles Stone (W)	6 ft 2 in (1.88 m)	180 lb (82 kg)	Jr	Columbus HS	Columbus, GA

Head coach

- Antoine Pettway (Alabama)

Assistant coach(es)

- Willie Watson (Alabama)
- Donovan Kates (Manhattan)
- Philip Pearson (Alabama)

Legend

- (C) Team captain
- (S) Suspended
- (I) Ineligible
- (W) Walk-on
- Injured
- Current redshirt

Roster

== Schedule and results ==
Date time, TV	Rank^{#}	Opponent^{#}	Result	Record	High points	High rebounds	High assists	Site (attendance) city, state
Non-conference regular season
November 5, 2024*; 7:00 p.m., ESPN+		Toccoa Falls	W 110–61	1–0	22 – Lue	9 – Gordon	6 – Cottle	Convocation Center (2,405); Kennesaw, GA
November 9, 2024*; 8:00 p.m., ESPN+		at California Baptist; C-USA/WAC Alliance	L 84–88	1–1	26 – Cottle	7 – Weir	5 – Wooley	Fowler Events Center; Riverside, CA
November 13, 2024*; 7:00 p.m., ESPN+		Bryan College	W 94–59	2–1	16 – Lue	9 – Tied	7 – Wooley	Convocation Center (1,505); Kennesaw, GA
November 16, 2024*; 11:00 a.m., ESPN+		Presbyterian	W 85–67	3–1	27 – Cottle	11 – Lue	4 – Cottle	Convocation Center (1,136); Kennesaw, GA
November 20, 2024*; 7:00 p.m., ESPN+		Abilene Christian; C-USA/WAC Alliance	W 84–78	4–1	22 – Cottle	7 – Miller	4 – Cottle	Convocation Center (1,381); Kennesaw, GA
November 24, 2024*; 1:00 p.m., CBSSN		No. 24 Rutgers	W 79–77	5–1	16 – Miller	10 – Miller	7 – Wooley	Convocation Center (3,805); Kennesaw, GA
November 28, 2024*; 7:30 p.m., ESPN+		vs. UC Irvine; Western Slam	L 59–76	5–2	19 – Wooley	6 – Tied	4 – Wooley	VisitLethbridge.com Arena (704); Lethbridge, AB
November 29, 2024*; 7:30 p.m., ESPN+		vs. Towson; Western Slam	W 67–63 ^{OT}	6–2	18 – Miller	7 – Tied	4 – Cottle	VisitLethbridge.com Arena; Lethbridge, AB
November 30, 2024*; 7:30 p.m., ESPN+		vs. Kent State; Western Slam	L 60–67	6–3	17 – Cottle	9 – Gordon	4 – Tied	VisitLethbridge.com Arena; Lethbridge, AB
December 6, 2024*; 7:00 p.m., ESPN+		at Georgia State	W 81–77	7–3	28 – Wooley	7 – Tied	4 – Tied	GSU Convocation Center (1,642); Atlanta, GA
December 18, 2024*; 10:00 p.m., ESPN+		at Santa Clara	L 74–94	7–4	25 – Wooley	5 – Tied	7 – Cottle	Leavey Center (1,047); Santa Clara, CA
December 21, 2024*; 10:30 p.m., MW Network		at San Jose State	L 65–89	7–5	22 – Cottle	15 – Miller	4 – Gordon	Provident Credit Union Event Center (1,767); San Jose, CA
December 29, 2024*; 2:00 p.m., ESPN+		Brewton–Parker	W 112–77	8–5	32 – Tied	10 – Miller	8 – Wooley	Convocation Center (1,358); Kennesaw, GA
Conference USA regular season
January 4, 2025; 5:00 p.m., ESPN+		Jacksonville State	W 83–71	9–5 (1–0)	28 – Cottle	12 – Gordon	4 – Tied	Convocation Center (2,007); Kennesaw, GA
January 9, 2025; 7:30 p.m., ESPN+		at Middle Tennessee	L 79–84	9–6 (1–1)	24 – Wooley	8 – Weir	4 – Tied	Murphy Center (2,051); Murfreesboro, TN
January 11, 2025; 3:00 p.m., ESPN+		at Western Kentucky	L 69–85	9–7 (1–2)	27 – Wooley	10 – Tied	2 – Tied	E. A. Diddle Arena (3,047); Bowling Green, KY
January 16, 2025; 7:00 p.m., ESPN+		Sam Houston	W 75–69 ^{OT}	10–7 (2–2)	25 – Wooley	10 – Lue	4 – Cottle	Convocation Center (1,788); Kennesaw, GA
January 18, 2025; 5:00 p.m., ESPN+		Louisiana Tech	W 78–76	11–7 (3–2)	25 – Cottle	9 – Weir	4 – Wooley	Convocation Center (1,707); Kennesaw, GA
January 23, 2025; 4:00 p.m., ESPN+		at New Mexico State	W 69–56	12–7 (4–2)	23 – Wooley	10 – Sherman	3 – Tied	Pan American Center (4,599); Las Cruces, NM
January 25, 2025; 9:00 p.m., ESPN+		at UTEP	L 71–73	12–8 (4–3)	19 – Cottle	9 – Sherman	5 – Cottle	Don Haskins Center (5,351); El Paso, TX
January 30, 2025; 8:00 p.m., CBSSN		Liberty	L 68–76	12–9 (4–4)	22 – Wooley	13 – Weir	5 – Wooley	Convocation Center (3,151); Kennesaw, GA
February 1, 2025; 5:00 p.m., ESPN+		FIU	W 73–67	13–9 (5–4)	18 – Wooley	7 – Gordon	5 – Cottle	Convocation Center (2,155); Kennesaw, GA
February 6, 2025; 7:00 p.m., ESPN+		Western Kentucky	W 76–69	14–9 (6–4)	30 – Cottle	11 – Tied	4 – Gordon	Convocation Center (2,242); Kennesaw, GA
February 8, 2025; 5:00 p.m., ESPN+		Middle Tennessee	L 75–76	14–10 (6–5)	29 – Wooley	12 – Gordon	7 – Wooley	Convocation Center (1,858); Kennesaw, GA
February 13, 2025; 7:30 p.m., ESPN+		at Louisiana Tech	W 69–47	15–10 (7–5)	19 – Cottle	7 – Wooley	7 – Wooley	Thomas Assembly Center (1,814); Ruston, LA
February 15, 2025; 3:30 p.m., ESPN+		at Sam Houston	L 76–78	15–11 (7–6)	21 – Cottle	9 – Miller	3 – Wooley	Bernard Johnson Coliseum (1,478); Huntsville, TX
February 20, 2025; 7:00 p.m., ESPN+		UTEP	W 83–73	16–11 (8–6)	21 – Wooley	7 – Gordon	7 – Wooley	Convocation Center (2,025); Kennesaw, GA
February 22, 2025; 5:00 p.m., ESPN+		New Mexico State	L 49–60	16–12 (8–7)	17 – Cottle	7 – Gordon	2 – Tied	Convocation Center (2,103); Kennesaw, GA
February 27, 2025; 7:00 p.m., ESPN+		at FIU	L 61–76	16–13 (8–8)	20 – Wooley	7 – Tied	3 – Tied	Ocean Bank Convocation Center (668); Miami, FL
March 2, 2025; 1:00 p.m., CBSSN		at Liberty	W 85–80	17–13 (9–8)	24 – Cottle	10 – Gordon	6 – Wooley	Liberty Arena (3,184); Lynchburg, VA
March 8, 2025; 3:00 p.m., ESPN+		at Jacksonville State	W 74–70	18–13 (10–8)	25 – Gordon	10 – Sherman	4 – Cottle	Pete Mathews Coliseum (2,977); Jacksonville, AL
Conference USA tournament
March 13, 2025; 6:30 p.m., ESPN+	(4)	vs. (5) New Mexico State; Quarterfinals	W 80–77	19–13	32 – Cottle	10 – Lue	4 – Tied	Propst Arena (2,770); Huntsville, AL
March 14, 2025; 12:30 p.m., CBSSN	(4)	vs. (1) Liberty; Semifinals	L 79–81	19–14	28 – Wooley	9 – Sherman	5 – Wooley	Propst Arena (2,434); Huntsville, AL
*Non-conference game. ^{#}Rankings from AP poll. (#) Tournament seedings in parentheses. All times are in Eastern.
