= 2024–25 UTEP Miners men's basketball team =

American college basketball season

2024–25 UTEP Miners men's basketball

Sun Bowl Invitational champions
- Conference: Conference USA
- Record: 18–15 (7–11 CUSA)
- Head coach: Joe Golding (4th season)
- Assistant coaches: Earl Boykins; Mike Roberts; Bryen Spriggs
- Home arena: Don Haskins Center

2024–25 Conference USA men's basketball standings
| | Conf. | | | | Overall |
| Team | W | | L | PCT | W | | L | PCT |
|---|---|---|---|---|---|---|---|---|
| Liberty † | 13 | – | 5 | .722 | 28 | – | 7 | .800 |
| Jacksonville State | 12 | – | 6 | .667 | 23 | – | 13 | .639 |
| Middle Tennessee | 12 | – | 6 | .667 | 22 | – | 12 | .647 |
| Kennesaw State | 10 | – | 8 | .556 | 19 | – | 14 | .576 |
| New Mexico State | 10 | – | 8 | .556 | 17 | – | 15 | .531 |
| Louisiana Tech | 9 | – | 9 | .500 | 20 | – | 12 | .625 |
| Western Kentucky | 8 | – | 10 | .444 | 17 | – | 15 | .531 |
| UTEP | 7 | – | 11 | .389 | 18 | – | 15 | .545 |
| Sam Houston | 6 | – | 12 | .333 | 13 | – | 19 | .406 |
| FIU | 3 | – | 15 | .167 | 10 | – | 23 | .303 |
† 2025 CUSA tournament winner

The 2024–25 UTEP Miners men's basketball team represented the University of Texas at El Paso during the 2024–25 NCAA Division I men's basketball season. The team, led by fourth-year head coach Joe Golding, played their home games at the Don Haskins Center in El Paso, Texas as a member of Conference USA.

== Previous season ==
The Miners finished the 2023–24 season 18–16, 7–9 in C-USA play to finish in a four-way tie for fourth place. As n No. 5 seed in the C-USA tournament they defeated Liberty in the quarterfinals and Sam Houston in the semifinals before losing in the championship game to Western Kentucky.

== Offseason ==
=== Departures ===
| Name | Number | Pos. | Height | Weight | Year | Hometown | Reason for departure |
|---|---|---|---|---|---|---|---|
| Zid Powell | 0 | G | 6'4" | 204 | Senior | Philadelphia, PA | Graduated |
| Jon Don Anjos | 1 | F | 6'8" | 205 | (redshirt) Senior | Curitiba, Brazil | Graduated |
| Tae Hardy | 2 | G | 6'3" | 190 | Senior | Ellenwood, GA | Graduated |
| Calvin Solomon | 13 | F | 6'7" | 205 | Senior | Houston, TX | Graduated |
| Garrett Levesque | 20 | G | 6'6" | 205 | Junior | El Paso, TX | Walk-on; transferred to Western Washington |
| Sebastian Cole | 21 | G | 6'1" | 170 | Junior | Aurora, CO | Walk-on; transferred to Coker |

=== Incoming transfers ===
| Name | Number | Pos. | Height | Weight | Year | Hometown | Previous school |
|---|---|---|---|---|---|---|---|
| DaCannon Wickware | 0 | F | 6'7" | | Sophomore | Dallas, TX | Lee College |
| Jordan Hernandez | 2 | G | 5'11" | 175 | Junior | El Paso, TX | Walk-on; Cochise College |
| Ahamad Bynum | 12 | G | 6'3" | 180 | (redshirt) Junior | Chicago, IL | Trinity Valley CC |
| Devon Barnes | 13 | G | 6'0" | 171 | Junior | Hinesville, GA | Tarleton State |

=== Recruiting classes ===
==== 2024 recruiting class ====
College recruiting
| Name | Hometown | School | Height | Weight | Commit date |
|---|---|---|---|---|---|
| KJ Thomas; PG | Canyon, TX | Randall High School | 6 ft 1 in (1.85 m) | 165 lb (75 kg) | Sep 22, 2023 |
| KJ Thomas; PG | Recruit ratings: Scout: Rivals: 247Sports: ESPN: | | | | |
Overall recruit ranking:
Note: In many cases, Scout, Rivals, 247Sports, On3, and ESPN may conflict in their listings of height and weight.; In these cases, the average was taken. ESPN grades are on a 100-point scale.; Sources: "2024 Team Ranking". Rivals.

==== 2025 recruiting class ====
College recruiting (2025)
| Name | Hometown | School | Height | Weight | Commit date |
|---|---|---|---|---|---|
| De'Erick Barber #27 PG | Cleveland, OH | Richmond Heights High School | 6 ft 1 in (1.85 m) | 165 lb (75 kg) | Aug 28, 2024 |
| De'Erick Barber #27 PG | Recruit ratings: Rivals: 247Sports: ESPN: (79) | | | | |
Overall recruit ranking:
Note: In many cases, Scout, Rivals, 247Sports, On3, and ESPN may conflict in their listings of height and weight.; In these cases, the average was taken. ESPN grades are on a 100-point scale.; Sources: "2025 Team Ranking". Rivals.

== Roster ==
2024–25 UTEP Miners men's basketball team
Players
Coaches

| Pos. | # | Name | Height | Weight | Year | Previous school | Hometown |
|---|---|---|---|---|---|---|---|
| F | 0 | DaCannon Wickware | 6 ft 7 in (2.01 m) | 210 lb (95 kg) | So | Lee College | Dallas, Texas |
| G | 1 | KJ Thomas | 6 ft 1 in (1.85 m) | 170 lb (77 kg) | Fr | Canyon Randall | Amarillo, Texas |
| G | 2 | Jordan Hernandez (W) | 5 ft 11 in (1.8 m) | 170 lb (77 kg) | Jr | Cochise College | El Paso, Texas |
| G | 3 | Baylor Hebb | 6 ft 2 in (1.88 m) | 180 lb (82 kg) | Sr | Colorado State | Colleyville, Texas |
| G | 4 | Corey Camper Jr. | 6 ft 5 in (1.96 m) | 180 lb (82 kg) | Sr | Tyler Junior College | Little Rock, Arkansas |
| G | 5 | David Terrell Jr. | 6 ft 4 in (1.93 m) | 185 lb (84 kg) | So | Mansfield Summit | Dallas, Texas |
| G | 11 | Trey Horton III | 6 ft 5 in (1.96 m) | 205 lb (93 kg) | So | Providence Day School | Charlotte, North Carolina |
| G | 12 | Ahamad Bynum | 6 ft 3 in (1.91 m) | 180 lb (82 kg) | RS Jr | Trinity Valley CC | Chicago, Illinois |
| G | 13 | Devon Barnes | 6 ft 1 in (1.85 m) | 175 lb (79 kg) | So | Tarleton State | El Paso, Texas |
| G | 15 | Antwonne Holmes (W) | 6 ft 3 in (1.91 m) | 170 lb (77 kg) | RS So | Chapin | El Paso, Texas |
| F | 20 | Raijon Dispensa (W) | 6 ft 9 in (2.06 m) | 210 lb (95 kg) | Fr | South Kent HS | Mullica Hill, New Jersey |
| F | 23 | Otis Frazier III | 6 ft 6 in (1.98 m) | 210 lb (95 kg) | Sr | George Mason | Buckeye, Arizona |
| F | 25 | Babacar Mbengue | 7 ft 0 in (2.13 m) | 250 lb (113 kg) | RS Fr | DePaul | Dakar, Senegal |
| F | 32 | Derick Hamilton | 6 ft 10 in (2.08 m) | 275 lb (125 kg) | Sr | Bossier Parish CC | Baton Rouge, Louisiana |
| F | 33 | Elijah Jones | 6 ft 8 in (2.03 m) | 210 lb (95 kg) | RS So | East Carolina | Pleasantville, New Jersey |
| F | 34 | Kevin Kalu | 6 ft 9 in (2.06 m) | 235 lb (107 kg) | Sr | Our Lady of Mount Carmel School | Baltimore, Maryland |

Head coach

- Joe Golding (Abilene Christian)

Assistant coach(es)

- Earl Boykins (Eastern Michigan)
- Mike Roberts (Indiana)
- Bryen Spriggs (Slippery Rock)

Legend

- (C) Team captain
- (S) Suspended
- (I) Ineligible
- (W) Walk-on
- Injured
- Current redshirt

Roster

== Schedule and results ==
| Date time, TV | Rank^{#} | Opponent^{#} | Result | Record | High points | High rebounds | High assists | Site (attendance) city, state |
Exhibition
| October 19, 2024*; 7:30 p.m. | | UACH | W 111–62 | – | – | – | – | Don Haskins Center; El Paso, TX |
| October 28, 2024*; 7:00 p.m. | | at New Mexico | L 70–74 | – | 21 – Frazier III | 5 – Hamilton | 4 – Tied | The Pit (10,359); Albuquerque, NM |
Non-conference regular season
| November 4, 2024*; 7:00 p.m., ESPN+ | | Sul Ross State | W 102–55 | 1–0 | 20 – Bynum | 5 – Hamilton | 4 – Camper Jr. | Don Haskins Center (4,055); El Paso, TX |
| November 9, 2024*; 2:00 p.m., ESPN+ | | at Utah Valley; C-USA/WAC Alliance | L 60–89 | 1–1 | 13 – Barnes | 8 – Kalu | 2 – Hebb | UCCU Center (1,653); Orem, UT |
| November 12, 2024*; 7:00 p.m., ESPN+ | | UT Permian Basin | W 78–58 | 2–1 | 17 – Frazier III | 7 – Kalu | 7 – Frazier III | Don Haskins Center (3,989); El Paso, TX |
| November 20, 2024*; 8:00 p.m., ESPN+ | | at UC Santa Barbara | W 79–76 | 3–1 | 23 – Barnes | 5 – Frazier III | 5 – Frazier III | The Thunderdome (2,573); Santa Barbara, CA |
| November 25, 2024*; 6:30 p.m., FloSports | | vs. San Jose State; Ball Dawgs Classic | L 65–71 | 3–2 | 21 – Camper Jr. | 4 – Tied | 5 – Camper Jr. | Lee's Family Forum (104); Henderson, NV |
| November 26, 2024*; 6:30 p.m., FloSports | | vs. Long Beach State; Ball Dawgs Classic | W 70–44 | 4–2 | 16 – Terrell Jr. | 7 – Frazier III | 3 – Camper Jr. | Lee's Family Forum; Henderson, NV |
| November 27, 2024*; 5:30 p.m., FloSports | | vs. UNC Greensboro; Ball Dawgs Classic | W 64–58 | 5–2 | 19 – Camper Jr. | 7 – Kalu | 3 – Tied | Lee's Family Forum; Henderson, NV |
| December 7, 2024*; 2:00 p.m., ESPN+ | | Seattle | W 88–72 | 6–2 | 19 – Bynum | 5 – Hamilton | 5 – Frazier III | Don Haskins Center (4,522); El Paso, TX |
| December 11, 2024*; 5:00 p.m., ACCNX/ESPN+ | | at Louisville | L 74–77 | 6–3 | 19 – Camper Jr. | 9 – Kalu | 3 – Camper Jr. | KFC Yum! Center (11,668); Louisville, KY |
| December 16, 2024*; 7:00 p.m., ESPN+ | | Tarleton State; C-USA/WAC Alliance | W 67–62 | 7–3 | 18 – Frazier III | 6 – Terrell Jr. | 4 – Terrell Jr. | Don Haskins Center (4,442); El Paso, TX |
| December 20, 2024*; 7:00 p.m., YouTube | | Jackson State; Sun Bowl Invitational semifinals | W 67–61 | 8–3 | 16 – Frazier III | 12 – Kalu | 3 – Barnes | Don Haskins Center (4,916); El Paso, TX |
| December 21, 2024*; 7:00 p.m., YouTube | | Yale; Sun Bowl Invitational championships | W 75–74 | 9–3 | 15 – Frazier III | 8 – Kalu | 4 – Terrell Jr. | Don Haskins Center (5,316); El Paso, TX |
| December 28, 2024*; 7:00 p.m., ESPN+ | | Northern New Mexico | W 79–60 | 10–3 | 15 – Camper Jr. | 6 – Frazier III | 7 – Frazier III | Don Haskins Center (4,573); El Paso, TX |
Conference USA regular season
| January 2, 2025; 7:00 p.m., ESPN+ | | Louisiana Tech | W 70–60 | 11–3 (1–0) | 21 – Frazier III | 11 – Frazier III | 5 – Terrell Jr. | Don Haskins Center (4,692); El Paso, TX |
| January 4, 2025; 7:00 p.m., ESPN+ | | Sam Houston | W 81–72 | 12–3 (2–0) | 17 – Barnes | 7 – Kalu | 6 – Terrell Jr. | Don Haskins Center (5,774); El Paso, TX |
| January 11, 2025; 7:00 p.m., ESPN+ | | New Mexico State; Battle of I-10 | L 57–85 | 12–4 (2–1) | 17 – Terrell Jr. | 5 – Frazier III | 5 – Terrell Jr. | Don Haskins Center (12,000); El Paso, TX |
| January 16, 2025; 7:00 p.m., CBSSN | | at Liberty | W 72–70 | 13–4 (3–1) | 14 – Frazier III | 9 – Terrell Jr. | 7 – Camper Jr. | Liberty Arena (3,598); Lynchburg, VA |
| January 18, 2025; 12:00 p.m., ESPN+ | | at FIU | W 81–73 | 14–4 (4–1) | 22 – Frazier III | 6 – Camper Jr. | 4 – Tied | Ocean Bank Convocation Center (649); Miami, FL |
| January 23, 2025; 7:00 p.m., ESPN+ | | Jacksonville State | L 66–73 | 14–5 (4–2) | 17 – Frazier III | 8 – Kalu | 3 – Terrell Jr. | Don Haskins Center (4,372); El Paso, TX |
| January 25, 2025; 7:00 p.m., ESPN+ | | Kennesaw State | W 73–71 | 15–5 (5–2) | 17 – Frazier III | 6 – Terrell Jr. | 6 – Terrell Jr. | Don Haskins Center (5,351); El Paso, TX |
| January 30, 2025; 6:00 p.m., ESPN+ | | at Western Kentucky | L 74–78 | 15–6 (5–3) | 15 – Terrell Jr. | 7 – Frazier III | 8 – Terrell Jr. | E. A. Diddle Arena (2,947); Bowling Green, KY |
| February 1, 2025; 1:00 p.m., ESPN+ | | at Middle Tennessee | L 68–71 | 15–7 (5–4) | 15 – Terrell Jr. | 11 – Terrell Jr. | 6 – Terrell Jr. | Murphy Center (4,012); Murfreesboro, TN |
| February 8, 2025; 7:00 p.m., ESPN+ | | at New Mexico State; Battle of I-10 | W 66–63 | 16–7 (6–4) | 18 – Barnes | 10 – Kalu | 6 – Terrell Jr. | Pan American Center (8,941); Las Cruces, NM |
| February 13, 2025; 7:00 p.m., ESPN+ | | FIU | W 77–63 | 17–7 (7–4) | 14 – Kalu | 12 – Frazier III | 7 – Terrell Jr. | Don Haskins Center (4,089); El Paso, TX |
| February 15, 2025; 7:00 p.m., ESPN+ | | Liberty | L 69–76 | 17–8 (7–5) | 16 – Frazier III | 6 – Terrell Jr. | 7 – Terrell Jr. | Don Haskins Center (5,687); El Paso, TX |
| February 20, 2025; 5:00 p.m., ESPN+ | | at Kennesaw State | L 73–83 | 17–9 (7–6) | 24 – Bynum | 5 – Tied | 4 – Terrell Jr. | Convocation Center (2,025); Kennesaw, GA |
| February 22, 2025; 3:00 p.m., ESPN+ | | at Jacksonville State | L 65–73 | 17–10 (7–7) | 25 – Frazier III | 10 – Frazier III | 4 – Terrell Jr. | Pete Mathews Coliseum (2,334); Jacksonville, AL |
| February 27, 2025; 7:00 p.m., CBSSN | | Western Kentucky | L 73–80 | 17–11 (7–8) | 14 – Tied | 8 – Terrell Jr. | 5 – Terrell Jr. | Don Haskins Center (4,322); El Paso, TX |
| March 1, 2025; 2:00 p.m., ESPN+ | | Middle Tennessee | L 75–76 ^{OT} | 17–12 (7–9) | 26 – Kalu | 11 – Frazier III | 6 – Terrell Jr. | Don Haskins Center (5,854); El Paso, TX |
| March 6, 2025; 5:30 p.m., ESPN+ | | at Sam Houston | L 87–89 | 17–13 (7–10) | 16 – Barnes | 5 – Barnes | 4 – Terrell Jr. | Bernard Johnson Coliseum (837); Huntsville, TX |
| March 8, 2025; 1:00 p.m., ESPN+ | | at Louisiana Tech | L 58–76 | 17–14 (7–11) | 12 – Thomas | 6 – Jones | 1 – Tied | Thomas Assembly Center (1,955); Ruston, LA |
Conference USA tournament
| March 11, 2025; 4:30 p.m., ESPN+ | (8) | vs. (9) Sam Houston; First round | W 79–65 | 18–14 | 18 – Camper Jr. | 15 – Kalu | 7 – Terrell Jr. | Von Braun Center (989); Huntsville, AL |
| March 12, 2025; 4:30 p.m., ESPN+ | (8) | vs. (1) Liberty; Quarterfinals | L 60–81 | 18–15 | 18 – Barnes | 5 – Tied | 4 – Terrell Jr. | Von Braun Center; Huntsville, AL |
*Non-conference game. ^{#}Rankings from AP Poll. (#) Tournament seedings in parentheses. All times are in Mountain.
