= Adrian Wooley =

American basketball player

No. 14 – Louisville Cardinals
- Position: Shooting guard
- League: Atlantic Coast Conference

Personal information
- Born: November 1, 2005 (age 21)
- Listed height: 6 ft 4 in (1.93 m)
- Listed weight: 205 lb (93 kg)

Career information
- High school: Paul W. Bryant (Tuscaloosa, Alabama)
- College: Kennesaw State (2024–2025); Louisville (2025–present)

Career highlights
- Conference USA Freshman of the Year (2025); First-team All-Conference USA (2025)

Adrian Wooley (born November 1, 2005) is an American college basketball player for the Louisville Cardinals of the Atlantic Coast Conference (ACC). He previously played for the Kennesaw State Owls.

== Career ==
Wooley attended Paul W. Bryant High School in Tuscaloosa, Alabama. He committed to play college basketball at Kennesaw State University over offers from Florida Gulf Coast, Marshall, and Murray State. As a freshman for the Owls, he made an instant impact, being named the Conference USA Freshman of the Week a record 11 times. Wooley finished his freshman season averaging 18.8 points, 5.2 rebounds, and 3.6 assists per game, being named the Conference USA Freshman of the Year. On March 26, 2025, he entered the transfer portal.

On March 31, 2025, Wooley announced his decision to transfer to the University of Louisville to play for the Louisville Cardinals.

== Career statistics ==
Legend
| GP | Games played | GS | Games started | MPG | Minutes per game |
| FG% | Field goal percentage | 3P% | 3-point field goal percentage | FT% | Free throw percentage |
| RPG | Rebounds per game | APG | Assists per game | SPG | Steals per game |
| BPG | Blocks per game | PPG | Points per game | **Bold** | Career high |

=== College ===
| Year | Team | GP | GS | MPG | FG% | 3P% | FT% | RPG | APG | SPG | BPG | PPG |
|---|---|---|---|---|---|---|---|---|---|---|---|---|
| 2024–25 | Kennesaw State | 33 | 32 | 33.5 | .512 | .422 | .769 | 5.2 | 3.6 | 1.4 | .1 | 18.8 |
