= Sun Bowl Invitational =

College basketball tournament

WestStar Don Haskins Sun Bowl Invitational
- Sport: College basketball
- Founded: 1961
- No. of teams: 4
- Venue: Don Haskins Center
- Most recent champion: UC Irvine
- Sponsor: WestStar Bank
- Tournament format: Single elimination
- Official website: sunbowl.org

The WestStar Don Haskins Sun Bowl Invitational is an annual men's NCAA Division I college basketball tournament held in El Paso, Texas. The tournament was founded in 1961. It is held at the Don Haskins Center. Four teams compete in a two-day, four-game bracketed tournament.

== History and format ==
The inaugural tournament took place December 28–29, 1961, at the Memorial Gym on the UTEP campus, featuring Baylor (SWC), New Mexico (Independent), and New Mexico State (Border). UTEP defeated New Mexico to win the championship.

== Brackets ==
=== 2025 ===
The 2025 tournament is set to take place from December 21–22, 2025 at Don Haskins Center in El Paso, featuring the following teams:

Semifinals; December 21
North Dakota State	73
UC Irvine	74
Norfolk State	72
UTEP	71

Championship; December 22
UC Irvine	89
Norfolk State	70
3rd place Game; December 22
North Dakota State	66
UTEP	76

=== 2024 ===
The 2024 tournament is set to take place from December 20–21, 2024 at Don Haskins Center in El Paso, featuring the following teams:

Semifinals; December 20
Akron	58
Yale	74
Jackson State	61
UTEP	67

Championship; December 21
Yale	74
UTEP	75
3rd place Game; December 21
Akron	68
Jackson State	50

== Champions ==
Champions
Year	Champion
1961	UTEP
1962	UTEP
1963	UTEP
1964	New Mexico
1965	UTEP
1966	SMU
1967	UTEP
1968	UTEP
1969	UTEP
1970	Southern California
1971	UTEP
1972	UTEP
1973	UTEP
1974	UTEP
1975	UTEP
1976	Missouri
1977	Memphis State
1978	Clemson
1979	UTEP
1980	Villanova
1981	UTEP
1982	SMU
1983	UTEP
1984	Purdue
1985	UTEP
1986	UTEP
1987	UTEP
1988	UTEP
1989	South Carolina
1990	UTEP
1991	UTEP
1992	Purdue
1993	UTEP
1994	Texas
1995	UTEP
1996	Princeton
1997	St. Joseph's
1998	Detroit
1999	Kent State
2000	UTEP
2001	Ole Miss
2002	UAB
2003	UTEP
2004	UTEP
2005	Georgetown
2006	Drake
2007	UTEP
2008	No Tournament
2009	UTEP
2010	Sam Houston State
2011	Colorado State
2012	UTEP
2013	UTEP
2014	UTEP
2015	UC Irvine
2016	Akron
2017	North Dakota State
2018	East Tennessee State
2019	UTEP
2021	Bradley
2022	Kent State
2023	UTEP
2024	UTEP
2025	UC Irvine
