= 2024–25 Middle Tennessee Blue Raiders men's basketball team =

American college basketball season

2024–25 Middle Tennessee Blue Raiders men's basketball

NIT, First Round
- Conference: Conference USA
- Record: 22–12 (12–6 CUSA)
- Head coach: Nick McDevitt (7th season)
- Associate head coach: Wes Long
- Assistant coaches: Logan Johnson; Eric Wilson
- Home arena: Murphy Center

2024–25 Conference USA men's basketball standings
	Conf.				Overall
Team	W		L	PCT	W		L	PCT
Liberty †	13	–	5	.722	28	–	7	.800
Jacksonville State	12	–	6	.667	23	–	13	.639
Middle Tennessee	12	–	6	.667	22	–	12	.647
Kennesaw State	10	–	8	.556	19	–	14	.576
New Mexico State	10	–	8	.556	17	–	15	.531
Louisiana Tech	9	–	9	.500	20	–	12	.625
Western Kentucky	8	–	10	.444	17	–	15	.531
UTEP	7	–	11	.389	18	–	15	.545
Sam Houston	6	–	12	.333	13	–	19	.406
FIU	3	–	15	.167	10	–	23	.303
† 2025 CUSA tournament winner

The 2024–25 Middle Tennessee Blue Raiders men's basketball team represented Middle Tennessee State University during the 2024–25 NCAA Division I men's basketball season. The team were led by seventh-year head coach Nick McDevitt and played their home games at Murphy Center in Murfreesboro, Tennessee as members of Conference USA (C-USA).

== Previous season ==
The Blue Raiders finished the 2023–24 season 14–19, 7–9 in C-USA play to finish in a four-way tie for fourth place. As a No. 7 seed in the C-USA tournament, they defeated Louisiana Tech in quarterfinals before losing to Western Kentucky in the semifinals.

== Offseason ==
=== Departures ===
Name	Number	Pos.	Height	Weight	Year	Hometown	Reason for departure
Ty Mosley	1	G	6'5"	190	Senior	Chicago, IL	Graduated
Elias King	10	F	6'8"	215	Senior	Atlanta, GA	Graduated
Jalen Jordan	14	G	6'2"	170	(redshirt) Senior	Conyers, GA	Graduated
Josh Ogundele	23	C	6'11"	300	Junior	London, England	Transferred to Tennessee State
Jared Coleman-Jones	31	F	6'10"	240	Junior	Hiram, GA	Transferred to San Diego State

=== Incoming transfers ===
Name	Number	Pos.	Height	Weight	Year	Hometown	Previous school
Alec Oglesby	1	G	6'5"	187	GS senior	Gainesville, FL	Stetson
Jlynn Counter	2	G	6'3"	185	Senior	Oklahoma City, OK	IU Indy
Jarred Hall	5	F	6'8"		Sophomore	Lebanon, TN	Tulsa
Christian Fussell	7	F	6'10"	220	Senior	Decatur, GA	UT Martin
Essam Mostafa	44	C	6'9"	250	GS senior	Cairo, Egypt	TCU

=== 2024 recruiting class ===
There were no incoming recruits for 2024.

== Roster ==
2024–25 Middle Tennessee Blue Raiders men's basketball team
Players
Coaches

Pos.	#	Name	Height	Weight	Year	Previous school	Hometown
G	0	Isiah Lightsy (W)	6 ft 4 in (1.93 m)	190 lb (86 kg)	Sr	Siegel; Chattanooga State	Murfreesboro, TN
G	1	Alec Oglesby	6 ft 5 in (1.96 m)	200 lb (91 kg)	GS	The Rock School (FL); Stetson	Gainesville, FL
G	2	Jlynn Counter	6 ft 3 in (1.91 m)	195 lb (88 kg)	Sr	Feltrim Academy (FL); IU Indy	Oklahoma City, OK
G	3	Jestin Porter	6 ft 1 in (1.85 m)	180 lb (82 kg)	Sr	Cypress Ridge HS; Tyler JC	Houston, TX
G	4	Justin Bufford	6 ft 6 in (1.98 m)	190 lb (86 kg)	Sr	Montgomery Catholic; Shelton State CC	Selma, AL
F	5	Jarred Hall	6 ft 8 in (2.03 m)	205 lb (93 kg)	So	Lebanon HS; Tulsa	Lebanon, TN
F	7	Christian Fussell	6 ft 10 in (2.08 m)	225 lb (102 kg)	Sr	Greenforest Christian Academy; UT Martin	Decatur, GA
F	10	Torey Alston	6 ft 8 in (2.03 m)	200 lb (91 kg)	RS Fr	Winston Salem Christian School	Winston-Salem, NC
G	11	Tre Green	6 ft 3 in (1.91 m)	190 lb (86 kg)	Jr	Glenelg Country School	Baltimore, MD
F	13	Chris Loofe	6 ft 11 in (2.11 m)	230 lb (104 kg)	So	Link Year Prep (MO)	Leander, TX
G	15	Jacob Johnson	6 ft 5 in (1.96 m)	195 lb (88 kg)	RS Sr	Champlin Park; LIU	Minneapolis, MN
G	24	Camryn Weston	6 ft 3 in (1.91 m)	190 lb (86 kg)	RS Sr	Westover HS; Southeastern CC	Albany, GA
C	44	Essam Mostafa	6 ft 9 in (2.06 m)	250 lb (113 kg)	GS	Long Island Lutheran HS; TCU	Cairo, Egypt
G	55	Jack Jubenville (W)	6 ft 0 in (1.83 m)	180 lb (82 kg)	RS Jr	Middle Tennessee Christian	Murfreesboro, TN

Head coach

- Nick McDevitt (UNC Asheville)

Assistant coach(es)

- Wes Long (Clemson)
- Logan Johnson (Coastal Carolina)
- Eric Wilson (Western Carolina)

Legend

- (C) Team captain
- (S) Suspended
- (I) Ineligible
- (W) Walk-on
- Injured
- Current redshirt

Roster

== Schedule and results ==
Date time, TV	Rank^{#}	Opponent^{#}	Result	Record	High points	High rebounds	High assists	Site (attendance) city, state
Non-conference regular season
November 4, 2024*; 11:00 a.m., ESPN+		Oglethorpe	W 97–51	1–0	20 – Porter	10 – Mostafa	7 – Weston	Murphy Center (7,501); Murfreesboro, TN
November 9, 2024*; 6:00 p.m., ESPN+		at Abilene Christian; C-USA/WAC Alliance	W 79–56	2–0	24 – Porter	7 – Mostafa	3 – Counter	Moody Coliseum (1,434); Abilene, TX
November 13, 2024*; 6:30 p.m., ESPN+		Evansville	W 80–63	3–0	18 – Mostafa	10 – Mostafa	3 – Mostafa	Murphy Center (3,509); Murfreesboro, TN
November 16, 2024*; 3:00 p.m., ESPN+		Murray State	L 67–88	3–1	19 – Lands	6 – Mostafa	4 – Weston	Murphy Center (3,812); Murfreesboro, TN
November 21, 2024*; 11:00 a.m., ESPNU		vs. Ohio; Myrtle Beach Invitational Quarterfinals	W 83–81 ^{OT}	4–1	24 – Porter	13 – Mostafa	4 – Tied	HTC Center (704); Conway, SC
November 22, 2024*; 1:00 p.m., ESPN2		vs. South Florida; Myrtle Beach Invitational Semifinals	W 95–88	5–1	26 – Porter	10 – Mostafa	5 – Tied	HTC Center (1,428); Conway, SC
November 24, 2024*; 4:30 p.m., ESPN		vs. Bradley; Myrtle Beach Invitational Championship Game	L 69–80	5–2	15 – Loofe	7 – Alston	3 – Weston	HTC Center (712); Conway, SC
December 1, 2024*; 3:00 p.m., ESPN2		at UAB	W 76–69	6–2	18 – Porter	9 – Mostafa	3 – Tied	Bartow Arena (3,257); Birmingham, AL
December 4, 2024*; 6:30 p.m., ESPN+		Rhodes	W 103–55	7–2	14 – Tied	11 – Alston	8 – Weston	Murphy Center (2,046); Murfreesboro, TN
December 7, 2024*; 2:30 p.m., ESPN+		at Belmont	L 79–82	7–3	22 – Counter	11 – Mostafa	5 – Counter	Curb Event Center (2,049); Nashville, TN
December 16, 2024*; 6:30 p.m., ESPN+		California Baptist; C-USA/WAC Alliance	W 75–64	8–3	30 – Weston	6 – Tied	3 – Lands	Murphy Center (1,724); Murfreesboro, TN
December 19, 2024*; 6:30 p.m., ESPN+		Lipscomb	W 67–65	9–3	14 – Porter	10 – Mostafa	3 – Counter	Murphy Center (3,432); Murfreesboro, TN
December 23, 2024*; 6:00 p.m., SECN		at No. 1 Tennessee	L 64–82	9–4	24 – Weston	7 – Alston	2 – Counter	Thompson–Boling Arena (20,706); Knoxville, TN
Conference USA regular season
January 2, 2025; 6:00 p.m., ESPN+		at FIU	W 73–69	10–4 (1–0)	17 – Counter	5 – Tied	3 – Tied	Ocean Bank Convocation Center (560); Miami, FL
January 4, 2025; 5:00 p.m., CBSSN		at Liberty	L 63–73	10–5 (1–1)	16 – Weston	16 – Mostafa	4 – Counter	Liberty Arena (2,690); Lynchburg, VA
January 9, 2025; 6:30 p.m., ESPN+		Kennesaw State	W 84–79	11–5 (2–1)	27 – Porter	9 – Tied	6 – Counter	Murphy Center (2,051); Murfreesboro, TN
January 11, 2025; 5:00 p.m., ESPN+		Jacksonville State	W 81–64	12–5 (3–1)	29 – Porter	9 – Mostafa	9 – Counter	Murphy Center (2,237); Murfreesboro, TN
January 18, 2025; 6:00 p.m., ESPN+		Western Kentucky	W 71–57	13–5 (4–1)	15 – Porter	18 – Mostafa	4 – Weston	Murphy Center (6,512); Murfreesboro, TN
January 23, 2025; 6:30 p.m., ESPN+		at Sam Houston	W 77–75	14–5 (5–1)	28 – Porter	9 – Mostafa	6 – Counter	Bernard Johnson Coliseum (987); Huntsville, TN
January 25, 2025; 3:30 p.m., ESPNU		at Louisiana Tech	L 69–75	14–6 (5–2)	16 – Weston	6 – Loofe	5 – Counter	Thomas Assembly Center (2,414); Ruston, LA
January 30, 2025; 6:30 p.m., ESPN+		New Mexico State	L 57–61	14–7 (5–3)	19 – Weston	9 – Loofe	3 – Porter	Murphy Center (3,307); Murfreesboro, TN
February 1, 2025; 2:00 p.m., ESPN+		UTEP	W 71–68	15–7 (6–3)	21 – Counter	11 – Mostafa	14 – Weston	Murphy Center (4,012); Murfreesboro, TN
February 6, 2025; 6:00 p.m., ESPN+		at Jacksonville State	L 63–77	15–8 (6–4)	17 – Porter	13 – Alston	3 – Tied	Pete Mathews Coliseum (2,943); Jacksonville, AL
February 8, 2025; 4:00 p.m., ESPN+		at Kennesaw State	W 76–75	16–8 (7–4)	22 – Porter	11 – Counter	8 – Counter	Convocation Center (1,858); Kennesaw, GA
February 15, 2025; 7:00 p.m., CBSSN		at Western Kentucky	W 87–77	17–8 (8–4)	21 – Mostafa	16 – Mostafa	7 – Weston	E. A. Diddle Arena (4,647); Bowling Green, KY
February 20, 2025; 8:00 p.m., CBSSN		Louisiana Tech	L 74–85	17–9 (8–5)	16 – Porter	6 – Tied	3 – Tied	Murphy Center (3,505); Murfreesboro, TN
February 22, 2025; 2:00 p.m., ESPN+		Sam Houston	W 74–70	18–9 (9–5)	17 – Green	8 – Mostafa	6 – Counter	Murphy Center (4,413); Murfreesboro, TN
February 27, 2025; 8:00 p.m., ESPN+		at New Mexico State	W 71–66	19–9 (10–5)	30 – Weston	7 – Mostafa	5 – Counter	Pan American Center (5,253); Las Cruces, NM
March 1, 2025; 3:00 p.m., ESPN+		at UTEP	W 76–75 ^{OT}	20–9 (11–5)	16 – Mostafa	16 – Mostafa	4 – Tied	Don Haskins Center (5,854); El Paso, TX
March 6, 2025; 6:30 p.m., CBSSN		Liberty	L 81–86	20–10 (11–6)	30 – Mostafa	20 – Mostafa	3 – Weston	Murphy Center (4,858); Murfreesboro, TN
March 8, 2025; 2:00 p.m., ESPN+		FIU	W 78–56	21–10 (12–6)	15 – Weston	8 – Tied	5 – Counter	Murphy Center (4,018); Murfreesboro, TN
Conference USA tournament
March 13, 2025; 8:00 p.m., ESPN+	(3)	vs. (6) Louisiana Tech; Quarterfinals	W 77–75 ^{2OT}	22–10	20 – Porter	8 – Alston	5 – Counter	Von Braun Center (3,108); Huntsville, AL
March 14, 2025; 2:00 p.m., CBSSN	(3)	vs. (2) Jacksonville State; Semifinals	L 68–70	22–11	18 – Counter	8 – Counter	4 – Counter	Von Braun Center (2,506); Huntsville, AL
NIT
March 18, 2025*; 7:00 p.m., ESPN+	(4)	Chattanooga; First round	L 103–109 ^{3OT}	22–12	31 – Weston	16 – Mostafa	5 – Tied	Murphy Center (3,505); Murfreesboro, TN
*Non-conference game. ^{#}Rankings from AP Poll. (#) Tournament seedings in parentheses. All times are in Central.

== See also ==
- 2024–25 Middle Tennessee Blue Raiders women's basketball team
