= 2024–25 Liberty Flames basketball team =

American college basketball season

2024–25 Liberty Flames basketball

CUSA regular season & tournament champions Paradise Jam champions

NCAA tournament, First Round
- Conference: Conference USA
- Record: 28–7 (13–5 CUSA)
- Head coach: Ritchie McKay (10th, 12th overall season)
- Associate head coach: Derek Johnston
- Assistant coaches: Joe Pierre III; Larry Mangino; Zach Farquhar; Stephen Burggraf
- Home arena: Liberty Arena

2024–25 Conference USA men's basketball standings
	Conf.				Overall
Team	W		L	PCT	W		L	PCT
Liberty †	13	–	5	.722	28	–	7	.800
Jacksonville State	12	–	6	.667	23	–	13	.639
Middle Tennessee	12	–	6	.667	22	–	12	.647
Kennesaw State	10	–	8	.556	19	–	14	.576
New Mexico State	10	–	8	.556	17	–	15	.531
Louisiana Tech	9	–	9	.500	20	–	12	.625
Western Kentucky	8	–	10	.444	17	–	15	.531
UTEP	7	–	11	.389	18	–	15	.545
Sam Houston	6	–	12	.333	13	–	19	.406
FIU	3	–	15	.167	10	–	23	.303
† 2025 CUSA tournament winner

The 2024–25 Liberty Flames basketball team represented Liberty University in the 2024–25 NCAA Division I men's basketball season. The Flames were led by Ritchie McKay in the tenth season of his current stint as head coach (12th overall). They played their home games at Liberty Arena in Lynchburg, Virginia as second-year members of Conference USA.

== Previous season ==
The Flames finished the 2023–24 season 18–14, 7–9 in C-USA play to finish a four-way tie for fourth place. As a No. 4 seed in the C-USA tournament they lost in the quarterfinals to UTEP.

== Offseason ==
=== Departures ===
Name	Number	Pos.	Height	Weight	Year	Hometown	Reason for departure
Brody Peebles	1	G	6'2"	170	Junior	Hartselle, AL	Transferred to Belmont
Jaylen Davis	12	G	6'6"	180	Freshman	Richmond, KY	Transferred
Kyle Rode	22	F	6'7"	220	(redshirt) Senior	Lexington, KY	Graduated
Joseph Venzant	23	G	6'3"	200	Junior	Midland, TX	Transferred to Abilene Christian
Shiloh Robinson	33	F	6'7"	235	(redshirt) Senior	Kearney, NE	Graduated
Ben Southerland	34	F	6'7"	210	(redshirt) Freshman	Cincinnati, OH	Transferred to Wright State

=== Incoming transfers ===
Name	Number	Pos.	Height	Weight	Year	Hometown	Previous school
Taelon Peter	2	G	6'4"		Senior	Russellville, AR	Arkansas Tech
Isaiah Ihnen	7	F	6'10"	220	(redshirt) Junior	Böblingen, Germany	Minnesota
Owen Aquino	8	F	6'8"	200	Junior	Madrid, Spain	Eastern Florida State College
Josh Smith	12	F	6'9"	215	Senior	Monrovia, IN	Stetson
Jayvon Maughmer	32	F	6'6"	210	GS senior	Chillicothe, OH	Cedarville

=== 2024 recruiting class ===
College recruiting
Name	Hometown	School	Height	Weight	Commit date
Brett Decker; PG	Elizabethtown, KY	Central Hardin High School	6 ft 1 in (1.85 m)	160 lb (73 kg)	Oct 23, 2022
Brett Decker; PG	Recruit ratings: 247Sports:				
Will Gibson; PF	Louisville, KY	DeSales High School	6 ft 6 in (1.98 m)	N/A	Oct 23, 2022
Will Gibson; PF	Recruit ratings: No ratings found				
Overall recruit ranking:
Note: In many cases, Scout, Rivals, 247Sports, On3, and ESPN may conflict in their listings of height and weight.; In these cases, the average was taken. ESPN grades are on a 100-point scale.; Sources: "2024 Team Ranking". Rivals.

=== 2025 recruiting class ===
College recruiting (2025)
Name	Hometown	School	Height	Weight	Commit date
Zander Carter; PG	Ashland, KY	Paul G. Blazer High School	6 ft 6 in (1.98 m)	N/A	Jun 19, 2023
Zander Carter; PG	Recruit ratings: 247Sports:				
Andrew Grimes; PF	Clayton, NC	Clayton High School	6 ft 8 in (2.03 m)	N/A	Sep 4, 2023
Andrew Grimes; PF	Recruit ratings: No ratings found				
TJ Drain; PF	Windermere, FL	Windermere High School	6 ft 7 in (2.01 m)	N/A	Aug 31, 2024
TJ Drain; PF	Recruit ratings: 247Sports:				
Overall recruit ranking:
Note: In many cases, Scout, Rivals, 247Sports, On3, and ESPN may conflict in their listings of height and weight.; In these cases, the average was taken. ESPN grades are on a 100-point scale.; Sources: "2025 Team Ranking". Rivals.

=== 2026 recruiting class ===
College recruiting (2026)
Name	Hometown	School	Height	Weight	Commit date
Eli Herbert; PG	Grain Valley, MO	Grain Valley High School	6 ft 1 in (1.85 m)	150 lb (68 kg)	Sep 4, 2024
Eli Herbert; PG	Recruit ratings: No ratings found				
Overall recruit ranking:
Note: In many cases, Scout, Rivals, 247Sports, On3, and ESPN may conflict in their listings of height and weight.; In these cases, the average was taken. ESPN grades are on a 100-point scale.; Sources: "2025 Team Ranking". Rivals.

== Roster ==
2024–25 Liberty Flames men's basketball team
Players
Coaches

Pos.	#	Name	Height	Weight	Year	Previous school	Hometown
G	0	Colin Porter	5 ft 9 in (1.75 m)	170 lb (77 kg)	Jr	Paul G. Blazer HS	Ashland, Kentucky
G	2	Taelon Peter	6 ft 4 in (1.93 m)	210 lb (95 kg)	Sr	Arkansas Tech	Russellville, Arkansas
G	3	Kaden Metheny	5 ft 10 in (1.78 m)	170 lb (77 kg)	RS Sr	Bowling Green	Morgantown, West Virginia
G	4	Brett Decker Jr.	6 ft 4 in (1.93 m)	190 lb (86 kg)	Fr	Central Hardin HS	Cecilia, Kentucky
F	5	Bryson Spell	6 ft 9 in (2.06 m)	230 lb (104 kg)	RS Jr	Cape Henry Collegiate School	Virginia Beach, Virginia
F	7	Isaiah Ihnen	6 ft 9 in (2.06 m)	220 lb (100 kg)	RS Jr	Minnesota	Böblingen, Germany
F	8	Owen Aquino	6 ft 8 in (2.03 m)	230 lb (104 kg)	Jr	Eastern Florida State College	Madrid, Spain
G	10	JC Shirer Jr. (W)	6 ft 3 in (1.91 m)	195 lb (88 kg)	RS So	Grace Preparatory Academy	Arlington, Texas
F	11	Zander Yates	6 ft 8 in (2.03 m)	225 lb (102 kg)	RS Jr	Creighton	Germantown, Tennessee
F	12	Josh Smith	6 ft 9 in (2.06 m)	225 lb (102 kg)	Sr	Stetson	Monrovia, Indiana
F	15	Will Gibson	6 ft 6 in (1.98 m)	225 lb (102 kg)	Fr	DeSales HS	Louisville, Kentucky
G	21	Gabriel McKay (W)	6 ft 2 in (1.88 m)	180 lb (82 kg)	GS	Trevecca Nazarene	Lynchburg, Virginia
G	24	Curtis Blair III	6 ft 6 in (1.98 m)	210 lb (95 kg)	RS Fr	The Steward School	Richmond, Virginia
F	25	Zach Cleveland	6 ft 7 in (2.01 m)	220 lb (100 kg)	Jr	Normal Community HS	Bloomington, Illinois
F	32	Jayvon Maughmer	6 ft 6 in (1.98 m)	205 lb (93 kg)	GS	Cedarville	Chillicothe, Ohio
F	45	Kai Yu	7 ft 0 in (2.13 m)	235 lb (107 kg)	RS Fr	Link Year Prep	Zhuhai, China

Head coach

- Ritchie McKay (Seattle Pacific)

Assistant coach(es)

- Derek Johnston (Alabama–Huntsville)
- Joe Pierre III (Oklahoma State)

Legend

- (C) Team captain
- (S) Suspended
- (I) Ineligible
- (W) Walk-on
- Injured
- Current redshirt

Roster

== Schedule and results ==
Date time, TV	Rank^{#}	Opponent^{#}	Result	Record	High points	High rebounds	High assists	Site (attendance) city, state
Non-conference regular season
November 4, 2024*; 5:00 p.m., Gray Media		vs. Valparaiso; Total Athlete Tip-Off	W 83–63	1–0	16 – Tied	11 – Aquino	8 – Cleveland	Wooden Family Fieldhouse (1,200); Xenia, OH
November 9, 2024*; 8:00 p.m., ESPN+		at Seattle; C-USA/WAC Alliance	W 66–64	2–0	15 – Metheny	9 – Aquino	5 – Porter	Redhawk Center (999); Seattle, WA
November 12, 2024*; 7:00 p.m., ESPN+		Carolina	W 81–45	3–0	18 – Decker Jr.	6 – Tied	6 – Porter	Liberty Arena (3,546); Lynchburg, VA
November 16, 2024*; 6:00 p.m., YouTube		vs. Florida Atlantic; Field of 68 Tip-Off	L 74–77 ^{OT}	3–1	19 – Metheny	8 – Tied	7 – Cleveland	TD Arena (331); Charleston, SC
November 17, 2024*; 4:00 p.m., YouTube		at Charleston; Field of 68 Tip-Off	W 68–47	4–1	20 – Cleveland	9 – Maughmer	5 – Tied	TD Arena (4,858); Charleston, SC
November 22, 2024*; 5:30 p.m., ESPN+		vs. Louisiana; Paradise Jam Quarterfinal	W 89–69	5–1	20 – Metheny	7 – Cleveland	8 – Cleveland	Elridge Wilburn Blake; Sports and Fitness Center (2,125); Saint Thomas, USVI
November 24, 2024*; 8:00 p.m., ESPN+		vs. Kansas State; Paradise Jam Semifinal	W 67–65	6–1	17 – Porter	9 – Cleveland	8 – Cleveland	Elridge Wilburn Blake; Sports and Fitness Center (2,225); Saint Thomas, USVI
November 25, 2024*; 8:00 pm, ESPN+		vs. McNeese; Paradise Jam Final	W 62–58	7–1	16 – Porter	6 – Tied	5 – Porter	Elridge Wilburn Blake; Sports and Fitness Center (1,986); Saint Thomas, USVI
November 29, 2024*; 4:00 p.m., ESPN+		Central Penn	W 93–36	8–1	25 – Ihnen	8 – Ihnen	5 – McKay	Liberty Arena (2,713); Lynchburg, VA
December 7, 2024*; 7:00 p.m., ESPN+		Mississippi Valley State	W 89–52	9–1	22 – Metheny	8 – Aquino	4 – Aquino	Liberty Arena (3,169); Lynchburg, VA
December 14, 2024*; 7:00 p.m., ESPN+		North Carolina A&T	W 83–74	10–1	28 – Aquino	10 – Aquino	7 – Tied	Liberty Arena (2,685); Lynchburg, VA
December 17, 2024*; 7:00 p.m., ESPN+		St. Andrews	W 124–50	11–1	30 – Peter	12 – Blair III	9 – Porter	Liberty Arena (2,125); Lynchburg, VA
December 21, 2024*; 2:00 p.m., ESPN+		UT Arlington; C-USA/WAC Alliance	W 79–56	12–1	25 – Metheny	10 – Cleveland	8 – Porter	Liberty Arena (2,649); Lynchburg, VA
Conference USA regular season
January 2, 2025; 7:00 p.m., CBSSN		Western Kentucky	L 70–71	12–2 (0–1)	18 – Cleveland	10 – Aquino	6 – Aquino	Liberty Arena (3,115); Lynchburg, VA
January 4, 2025; 6:00 p.m., CBSSN		Middle Tennessee	W 73–63	13–2 (1–1)	19 – Metheny	13 – Aquino	6 – Cleveland	Liberty Arena (2,690); Lynchburg, VA
January 9, 2025; 9:00 p.m., CBSSN		at Sam Houston	W 76–68	14–2 (2–1)	17 – Porter	12 – Aquino	5 – Porter	Bernard Johnson Coliseum (924); Huntsville, TX
January 11, 2025; 8:00 p.m., ESPNU		at Louisiana Tech	L 74–79	14–3 (2–2)	33 – Peter	6 – Maughmer	4 – Cleveland	Thomas Assembly Center (2,373); Ruston, LA
January 16, 2025; 9:00 p.m., CBSSN		UTEP	L 70–72	14–4 (2–3)	20 – Peter	9 – Cleveland	5 – Aquino	Liberty Arena (3,598); Lynchburg, VA
January 18, 2025; 7:00 p.m., CBSSN		New Mexico State	W 68–60	15–4 (3–3)	14 – Porter	7 – Peter	3 – Tied	Liberty Arena (3,776); Lynchburg, VA
January 25, 2025; 6:00 p.m., ESPN+		at FIU	W 82–59	16–4 (4–3)	21 – Peter	4 – Tied	5 – Porter	Ocean Bank Convocation Center (1,176); Miami, FL
January 30, 2025; 8:00 p.m., CBSSN		at Kennesaw State	W 76–68	17–4 (5–3)	17 – Metheney	5 – Metheney	6 – Cleveland	Convocation Center (3,151); Kennesaw, GA
February 1, 2025; 5:00 p.m., ESPN+		at Jacksonville State	L 61–72	17–5 (5–4)	19 – Peter	9 – Peter	7 – Cleveland	Pete Mathews Coliseum (2,967); Jacksonville, AL
February 6, 2025; 8:00 p.m., CBSSN		Louisiana Tech	W 77–53	18–5 (6–4)	16 – Peter	7 – Cleveland	5 – Cleveland	Liberty Arena (3,152); Lynchburg, VA
February 8, 2025; 4:00 p.m., ESPNews		Sam Houston	W 64–61	19–5 (7–4)	26 – Metheny	7 – Metheny	3 – Tied	Liberty Arena (3,355); Lynchburg, VA
February 13, 2025; 9:00 p.m., ESPN+		at New Mexico State	W 64–54	20–5 (8–4)	20 – Peter	8 – Tied	3 – Tied	Pan American Center (4,509); Las Cruces, NM
February 15, 2025; 9:00 p.m., ESPN+		at UTEP	W 76–69	21–5 (9–4)	23 – Peter	10 – Tied	7 – Cleveland	Don Haskins Center (5,687); El Paso, TX
February 22, 2025; 2:00 p.m., ESPN+		FIU	W 58–45	22–5 (10–4)	14 – Peter	6 – Peter	6 – Cleveland	Liberty Arena (4,000); Lynchburg, VA
February 27, 2025; 7:00 p.m., ESPN+		Jacksonville State	W 59–55	23–5 (11–4)	13 – Metheny	9 – Cleveland	5 – Porter	Liberty Arena (3,716); Lynchburg, VA
March 2, 2025; 1:00 p.m., CBSSN		Kennesaw State	L 80–85	23–6 (11–5)	16 – Tied	9 – Cleveland	8 – Cleveland	Liberty Arena (3,184); Lynchburg, VA
March 6, 2025; 7:30 p.m., CBSSN		at Middle Tennessee	W 86–81	24–6 (12–5)	33 – Peter	7 – Aquino	6 – Tied	Murphy Center (4,858); Murfreesboro, TN
March 8, 2025; 3:00 p.m., ESPN+		at Western Kentucky	W 90–61	25–6 (13–5)	21 – Tied	15 – Maughmer	8 – Cleveland	E. A. Diddle Arena (4,247); Bowling Green, KY
Conference USA Tournament
March 12, 2025; 6:30 p.m., ESPN+	(1)	vs. (8) UTEP; Quarterfinals	W 81–60	26–6	19 – Cleveland	6 – Maughmer	6 – Tied	Von Braun Center; Huntsville, AL
March 14, 2025; 12:30 p.m., CBSSN	(1)	vs. (4) Kennesaw State; Semifinals	W 81–79	27–6	24 – Metheny	6 – Tied	6 – Cleveland	Von Braun Center (2,434); Huntsville, AL
March 15, 2025; 8:30 p.m., CBSSN	(1)	vs. (2) Jacksonville State; Championship	W 59–55	28–6	13 – Metheny	9 – Cleveland	5 – Porter	Von Braun Center (2,146); Huntsville, AL
NCAA tournament
March 21, 2025*; 10:10 p.m., TruTV	(12 E)	vs. (5 E) No. 25 Oregon; First round	L 52–81	28–7	10 – Cleveland	6 – Cleveland	6 – Cleveland	Climate Pledge Arena (16,978); Seattle, WA
*Non-conference game. ^{#}Rankings from AP Poll. (#) Tournament seedings in parentheses. E=East. All times are in Eastern.
