= 2024–25 Jackson State Tigers basketball team =

American college basketball season

2024–25 Jackson State Tigers basketball
- Conference: Southwestern Athletic Conference
- Record: 16–18 (14–4 SWAC)
- Head coach: Mo Williams (3rd season)
- Associate head coach: Trey Johnson
- Assistant coaches: Tyler Adams; Keith Williams; Khalill Spencer; Kydarrius Williams
- Home arena: Williams Assembly Center

2024–25 SWAC men's basketball standings
	Conf.				Overall
Team	W		L	PCT	W		L	PCT
Southern	15	–	3	.833	20	–	12	.625
Jackson State	14	–	4	.778	16	–	18	.471
Bethune–Cookman	13	–	5	.722	17	–	16	.515
Texas Southern	12	–	6	.667	15	–	17	.469
Alabama State †	12	–	6	.667	20	–	16	.556
Alcorn State	11	–	7	.611	11	–	21	.344
Florida A&M	10	–	8	.556	14	–	17	.452
Grambling State	7	–	11	.389	12	–	22	.353
Alabama A&M	6	–	12	.333	10	–	22	.313
Prairie View A&M	4	–	14	.222	5	–	27	.156
Arkansas–Pine Bluff	3	–	15	.167	6	–	25	.194
Mississippi Valley State	1	–	17	.056	3	–	28	.097
† 2025 SWAC tournament winner

The 2024–25 Jackson State Tigers basketball team represented Jackson State University during the 2024–25 NCAA Division I men's basketball season. The Tigers, led by third-year head coach Mo Williams, played their home games at the Williams Assembly Center in Jackson, Mississippi, as members of the Southwestern Athletic Conference.

== Previous season ==
The Tigers finished the 2023–24 season 15–17, 11–7 in SWAC play, to finish in a tie for fifth place. They were defeated by Texas Southern in the quarterfinals of the SWAC tournament.

== Roster ==
2024–25 Jackson State Tigers men's basketball team
Players
Coaches

Pos.	#	Name	Height	Weight	Year	Previous school	Hometown
G/F	0	Tamarion Hoover	6 ft 5 in (1.96 m)	165 lb (75 kg)	Fr	Yazoo City High School	Yazoo City, Mississippi
G	1	Dorian McMillian	6 ft 3 in (1.91 m)	178 lb (81 kg)	Fr	Pascagoula High School	Pascagoula, Mississippi
G	2	Jalen Tatum	6 ft 4 in (1.93 m)	189 lb (86 kg)	Jr	Holmes Community College	Pine Bluff, Arkansas
G/F	3	Jayme Mitchell Jr.	6 ft 5 in (1.96 m)	190 lb (86 kg)	RS So	Alabama State	Jackson, Mississippi
G	5	Keiveon Hunt	5 ft 10 in (1.78 m)	180 lb (82 kg)	Jr	Callaway High School	Jackson, Mississippi
C	7	Shannon Grant	6 ft 11 in (2.11 m)	290 lb (132 kg)	GS	Florida A&M	Sylacauga, Alabama
C	10	Ebo Wilson	6 ft 10 in (2.08 m)	275 lb (125 kg)	Fr	Ridgeland High School	Accra, Ghana
G	12	Delyle Williams	6 ft 3 in (1.91 m)	200 lb (91 kg)	So	St. John Bosco High School	Compton, California
F	13	Romelle Mansel	6 ft 9 in (2.06 m)	220 lb (100 kg)	GS	Long Beach State	Los Angeles, California
F	14	Dylan Canoville	6 ft 5 in (1.96 m)	225 lb (102 kg)	Jr	Southeastern Louisiana	Plantation, Florida
F	15	Avaughn Johnson	6 ft 6 in (1.98 m)	205 lb (93 kg)	Jr	Co–Lin Community College	Jackson, Mississippi
G	20	Juan Reyna III	6 ft 3 in (1.91 m)	200 lb (91 kg)	RS Sr	UTSA	San Antonio, Texas
G	21	Marcus Watson Jr.	5 ft 10 in (1.78 m)	175 lb (79 kg)	Jr	Mineral Area College	Chicago, Illinois
G	24	Daeshun Ruffin	5 ft 11 in (1.8 m)	155 lb (70 kg)	Jr	Ole Miss	Jackson, Mississippi
F	30	David McDaniel	6 ft 8 in (2.03 m)	215 lb (98 kg)	Jr	Chattahoochee High School	Alpharetta, Georgia
G/F	55	Cowandric Samuel	6 ft 4 in (1.93 m)	200 lb (91 kg)	Sr	Co–Lin Community College	Jackson, Mississippi

Head coach

- Mo Williams (Alabama)

Assistant coach(es)

- Trey Johnson (Jackson State)
- Tyler Adams (Georgetown)
- Keith Williams (Arkansas–Pine Bluff)
- Khalill Spencer (Jackson State)
- Kydarrius Williams (Alabama)

Legend

- (C) Team captain
- (S) Suspended
- (I) Ineligible
- (W) Walk-on
- Injured
- Current redshirt

Roster
Last update: December 2, 2024

== Schedule and results ==
Date time, TV	Rank^{#}	Opponent^{#}	Result	Record	Site (attendance) city, state
Exhibition
October 24, 2024*; 6:00 pm		Belhaven	W 93–52	–	Williams Assembly Center (298); Jackson, MS
October 28, 2024*; 6:00 pm		at Southern Miss	L 85–92 ^{OT}	–	Reed Green Coliseum; Hattiesburg, MS
Non-conference regular season
November 4, 2024*; 7:00 pm, ESPN+		at No. 4 Houston	L 40–97	0–1	Fertitta Center (7,035); Houston, TX
November 9, 2024*; 1:00 pm, ESPN+		at High Point	L 71–80	0–2	Qubein Center (3,006); High Point, NC
November 12, 2024*; 7:30 pm, FS1		at Xavier	L 57–94	0–3	Cintas Center (10,107); Cincinnati, OH
November 16, 2024*; 2:00 pm, SECN+/ESPN+		at Vanderbilt	L 81–94	0–4	Memorial Gymnasium (5,249); Nashville, TN
November 20, 2024*; 7:00 pm, ESPN+		at Western Kentucky; BBN Invitational	L 62–79	0–5	E. A. Diddle Arena (2,347); Bowling Green, KY
November 22, 2024*; 6:00 pm, SECN+/ESPN+		at No. 9 Kentucky; BBN Invitational	L 59–108	0–6	Rupp Arena (19,961); Lexington, KY
November 24, 2024*; 4:00 pm, ESPN+		at Lipscomb; BBN Invitational	L 53–77	0–7	Allen Arena (1,227); Nashville, TN
December 2, 2024*; 7:00 pm, ESPN+		at Saint Louis	L 66–74	0–8	Chaifetz Arena (3,810); St. Louis, MO
December 5, 2024*; 7:00 pm, ESPN+		at Arkansas State	L 64–66	0–9	First National Bank Arena (3,221); Jonesboro, AR
December 8, 2024*; 5:00 pm, ESPN+		at No. 6 Iowa State	L 58–100	0–10	Hilton Coliseum (13,658); Ames, IA
December 20, 2024*; 6:00 pm, YouTube		at UTEP; Sun Bowl Invitational semifinals	L 61–67	0–11	Don Haskins Center (4,916); El Paso, TX
December 21, 2024*; 5:00 pm, YouTube		vs. Akron; Sun Bowl Invitational 3rd place game	L 50–68	0–12	Don Haskins Center; El Paso, TX
December 28, 2024*; 3:00 pm, ESPN+		at California Baptist	L 73–79	0–13	Fowler Events Center (2,603); Riverside, CA
SWAC regular season
January 4, 2025; 2:30 pm		at Alcorn State	W 72–69	1–13 (1–0)	Davey Whitney Complex (1,244); Lorman, MS
January 11, 2025; 3:30 pm		Alabama State	W 77–70	2–13 (2–0)	Williams Assembly Center (1,008); Jackson, MS
January 13, 2025; 7:00 pm		Alabama A&M	W 103–93 ^{3OT}	3–13 (3–0)	Williams Assembly Center (943); Jackson, MS
January 18, 2025; 4:30 pm		at Prairie View A&M	W 79–70	4–13 (4–0)	William Nicks Building (455); Prairie View, TX
January 20, 2025; 7:00 pm		at Texas Southern	L 73–81	4–14 (4–1)	H&PE Arena (1,058); Houston, TX
January 25, 2025; 3:30 pm		Bethune–Cookman	W 86–81	5–14 (5–1)	Williams Assembly Center (1,317); Jackson, MS
January 27, 2025; 7:00 pm		Florida A&M	L 62–72	5–15 (5–2)	Williams Assembly Center (1,285); Jackson, MS
February 1, 2025; 4:30 pm		at Grambling State	W 65–50	6–15 (6–2)	Fredrick C. Hobdy Assembly Center (2,800); Grambling, LA
February 3, 2025; 6:30 pm		at Southern	L 89–91 ^{OT}	6–16 (6–3)	F. G. Clark Center (5,621); Baton Rouge, LA
February 8, 2025; 3:30 pm		Mississippi Valley State	W 92–44	7–16 (7–3)	Williams Assembly Center (1,353); Jackson, MS
February 10, 2025; 7:00 pm		Arkansas–Pine Bluff	W 94–78	8–16 (8–3)	Williams Assembly Center (741); Jackson, MS
February 15, 2025; 5:00 pm		at Florida A&M	L 71–76	8–17 (8–4)	Al Lawson Center; Tallahassee, FL
February 17, 2025; 6:00 pm		at Bethune–Cookman	W 84–71	9–17 (9–4)	Moore Gymnasium (991); Daytona Beach, FL
February 22, 2025; 3:30 pm		Alcorn State	W 71–63	10–17 (10–4)	Williams Assembly Center (2,907); Jackson, MS
March 1, 2025; 3:30 pm		Texas Southern	W 67–52	11–17 (11–4)	Williams Assembly Center (1,312); Jackson, MS
March 3, 2025; 8:00 pm, ESPNU/ESPN+		Prairie View A&M	W 88–74	12–17 (12–4)	Williams Assembly Center (744); Jackson, MS
March 6, 2025; 7:00 pm		at Arkansas–Pine Bluff	W 76–69	13–17 (13–4)	H.O. Clemmons Arena (1,386); Pine Bluff, AR
March 8, 2025; 2:30 pm		at Mississippi Valley State	W 66–62	14–17 (14–4)	Harrison HPER Complex (3,914); Itta Bena, MS
SWAC tournament
March 12, 2025; 7:30 pm, ESPN+	(2)	vs. (7) Florida A&M; Quarterfinals	W 91–76	15–17	Gateway Center Arena (1,284); College Park, GA
March 14, 2025; 7:30 pm, ESPN+	(2)	vs. (3) Bethune–Cookman; Semifinals	W 71–50	16–17	Gateway Center Arena (2,894); College Park, GA
March 15, 2025; 8:30 pm, ESPNU	(2)	vs. (5) Alabama State; Championship	L 56–60	16–18	Gateway Center Arena; College Park, GA
*Non-conference game. ^{#}Rankings from AP Poll. (#) Tournament seedings in parentheses. All times are in Central.
