= Paterson Charter School for Science and Technology =

Charter school in Passaic County, New Jersey, US

Location
- 196 West Railway Avenue; Paterson, Passaic County, New Jersey 07503; United States
- 40.8960°N 74.1550°W

Information
- Type: Charter public elementary school / high school
- Established: 2004
- NCES School ID: 340008700735
- Faculty: 122.0 FTEs
- Grades: K–12
- Enrollment: 1,664 (as of 2023–24)
- Student to teacher ratio: 13.6:1
- Colors: Royal Blue and Gold
- Athletics conference: North Jersey Interscholastic Conference
- Team name: Lions
- Accreditation: Middle States Association of Colleges and Schools
- Website: www.pcsst.org

Paterson Charter School for Science and Technology is a comprehensive public charter elementary school / high school that serves students in kindergarten through twelfth grades located in Paterson, in Passaic County, in the U.S. state of New Jersey. The school operates under the terms of a charter granted by the New Jersey Department of Education granted in 2003, with authority to open in September 2004 with up to 178 students in grades six through nine, eventually expanding by the end of its initial charter in 2007 to nearly 500 students in grades 6 to 12. The school has been accredited by the Middle States Association of Colleges and Schools Commission on Elementary and Secondary Schools since 2014.

The school has sparked controversy, as it has been linked to the educational network of cleric Fetullah Gulen by local media.

As of the 2023–24 school year, the school had an enrollment of 1,664 students and 122.0 classroom teachers (on an FTE basis), for a student–teacher ratio of 13.6:1. There were 1,336 students (80.3% of enrollment) eligible for free lunch and 202 (12.1% of students) eligible for reduced-cost lunch.

== Awards, recognition and rankings ==
The school was the 279th-ranked public high school in New Jersey out of 339 schools statewide in New Jersey Monthly magazine's September 2014 cover story on the state's "Top Public High Schools".

== Athletics ==
The Paterson Charter School for Science and Technology Lions compete in the North Jersey Interscholastic Conference, which operates under the supervision of the New Jersey State Interscholastic Athletic Association. With 288 students in grades 10-12, the school was classified by the NJSIAA for the 2019–20 school year as Group I for most athletic competition purposes, which included schools with an enrollment of 75 to 476 students in that grade range.

School colors are royal blue and gold. Sports offered include softball (women), baseball (men), cross country (men and women), basketball (men and women), volleyball (women) and soccer (men and women).

The 2022 boys' basketball team won the Group I state championship, the first in program history, with a 91-67 win against Burlington City High School. In 2020, the team was declared as North I Regional Champion, after the remainder of the playoffs were cancelled due to the COVID-19 pandemic.
