= 2024–25 Western Kentucky Hilltoppers basketball team =

American college basketball season

2024–25 Western Kentucky Hilltoppers basketball
- Conference: Conference USA
- Record: 17–15 (8–10 CUSA)
- Head coach: Hank Plona (1st season)
- Assistant coaches: Martin Cross; Tim MacAllister; Eric Murphy; Josh Newman; Darryl Jackson
- Home arena: E. A. Diddle Arena

2024–25 Conference USA men's basketball standings
	Conf.				Overall
Team	W		L	PCT	W		L	PCT
Liberty †	13	–	5	.722	28	–	7	.800
Jacksonville State	12	–	6	.667	23	–	13	.639
Middle Tennessee	12	–	6	.667	22	–	12	.647
Kennesaw State	10	–	8	.556	19	–	14	.576
New Mexico State	10	–	8	.556	17	–	15	.531
Louisiana Tech	9	–	9	.500	20	–	12	.625
Western Kentucky	8	–	10	.444	17	–	15	.531
UTEP	7	–	11	.389	18	–	15	.545
Sam Houston	6	–	12	.333	13	–	19	.406
FIU	3	–	15	.167	10	–	23	.303
† 2025 CUSA tournament winner

The 2024–25 Western Kentucky Hilltoppers men's basketball team represented Western Kentucky University during the 2024–25 NCAA Division I men's basketball season. The team led by first-year head coach Hank Plona, played their home games at E. A. Diddle Arena in Bowling Green, Kentucky as eleventh-year members of Conference USA (C-USA).

== Previous season ==
The Hilltoppers finished the 2023–24 season 22–12, 8–8 in C-USA play, to finish in third place. As the No. 3 seed in the C-USA tournament, they defeated New Mexico State in the quarterfinals, Middle Tennessee in the semifinals, and UTEP in the finals to win the C-USA championship. As an automatic qualifier in the NCAA tournament, they earned the No. 15 seed, where they lost to No. 2 seed Marquette in the first round.

On April 1, 2024, Steve Lutz left the program to accept the head coaching job at Oklahoma State.

A day later, on April 2, 2024, the school named Hank Plona as the new head coach to lead the Hilltoppers.

== Offseason ==
=== Departures ===
Name	Number	Pos.	Height	Weight	Year	Hometown	Reason for departure
Rodney Howard	0	F	6' 11"	250	5th year	Ypsilanti, MI	Graduated
Brandon Newman	10	G	6' 5"	195	RS Senior	Valparaiso, IN	Graduate transferred to Oklahoma State
Dontaie Allen	11	G/F	6' 6"	210	RS Senior	Falmouth, KY	Transferred to Wyoming
BJ Marable	13	F	6' 9"	230	Senior	Knoxville, TN	Entered transfer portal

=== Incoming transfers ===
Name	Number	Pos.	Height	Weight	Year	Hometown	Previous school
Braxton Bayless	0	G	6' 2"	175	Graduate student	Ankeny, IA	Niagara
Blaise Keita	1	F/C	6' 11"	250	RS Senior	Bamako, Mali	Nebraska
Cade Stinnett	10	G	6' 3"	198	Junior	Bowling Green, KY	Centre College
Leeroy Odiahi	21	F/C	6' 11"	218	Senior	Tralee, Ireland	Old Dominion

=== Recruiting classes ===
==== 2024 recruiting class ====
College recruiting information
Name	Hometown	School	Height	Weight	Commit date
Kade Unseld; G/F	Bowling Green, KY	Warren Central HS	6 ft 5 in (1.96 m)	202 lb (92 kg)	Oct 23, 2023
Kade Unseld; G/F	Recruit ratings: Rivals: 247Sports: ESPN: (NR)				
Julius Thedford; G	Memphis, TN	Cordova HS	6 ft 4 in (1.93 m)	190 lb (86 kg)	Apr 15, 2024
Julius Thedford; G	Recruit ratings: Rivals: 247Sports: ESPN: (NR)				
Overall recruit ranking:
Note: In many cases, Scout, Rivals, 247Sports, On3, and ESPN may conflict in their listings of height and weight.; In these cases, the average was taken. ESPN grades are on a 100-point scale.; Sources: "2024 Team Ranking". Rivals.

== Roster ==
2024–25 WKU Hilltoppers men's basketball team
Players
Coaches

Pos.	#	Name	Height	Weight	Year	Previous school	Hometown
G	0	Braxton Bayless	6 ft 2 in (1.88 m)	175 lb (79 kg)	GS	Ankeny HS; Niagara	Ankeny, IA
F/C	1	Blaise Keita	6 ft 11 in (2.11 m)	250 lb (113 kg)	RS Sr	Sunrise Christian; Nebraska	Bamako, Mali
G	2	Don McHenry	6 ft 2 in (1.88 m)	168 lb (76 kg)	Sr	Milwaukee Academy of Science; Indian Hills CC	Milwaukee, WI
G	3	Jalen Jackson	5 ft 11 in (1.8 m)	180 lb (82 kg)	GS	Wagner HS; Texas A&M-CC	San Antonio, TX
G	4	Khristian Lander	6 ft 3 in (1.91 m)	190 lb (86 kg)	GS	Reitz HS; Indiana	Evansville, IN
F	5	Babacar Faye	6 ft 8 in (2.03 m)	215 lb (98 kg)	Sr	NBA Academy Africa	Saly, Senegal
G	6	Kade Unseld	6 ft 5 in (1.96 m)	202 lb (92 kg)	Fr	Warren Central HS	Bowling Green, KY
F/C	7	Fallou Diagne	6 ft 11 in (2.11 m)	205 lb (93 kg)	RS Sr	Compass Prep; Northwest Florida State College	Dakar, Senegal
G	10	Cade Stinnett	6 ft 3 in (1.91 m)	198 lb (90 kg)	Jr	Greenwood HS; Centre College	Bowling Green, KY
G	12	Terrion Murdix	6 ft 1 in (1.85 m)	170 lb (77 kg)	GS	Springfield Southeast HS; Texas A&M-CC	Springfield, IL
G	13	Julius Thedford	6 ft 4 in (1.93 m)	190 lb (86 kg)	Fr	Cordova HS (TN)	Memphis, TN
G	15	Jack Edelen	5 ft 10 in (1.78 m)	172 lb (78 kg)	So	Male HS	Louisville, KY
F/C	21	Leeroy Odiahi	6 ft 11 in (2.11 m)	218 lb (99 kg)	Sr	George Harris Prep Academy	Tralee, Ireland
G	22	Jaylen Dorsey	6 ft 5 in (1.96 m)	220 lb (100 kg)	Sr	Berea HS (KY)	Berea, KY
G	23	Enoch Kalambay	6 ft 6 in (1.98 m)	215 lb (98 kg)	Sr	Orangeville Prep	Gatineau, QC
F	24	Tyrone Marshall Jr.	6 ft 7 in (2.01 m)	215 lb (98 kg)	GS	Pearl-Cohn HS	Nashville, TN
G	30	Teagan Moore	6 ft 5 in (1.96 m)	220 lb (100 kg)	So	Owen County HS (KY)	Dry Ridge, KY
G	31	Tyler Olden	6 ft 0 in (1.83 m)	198 lb (90 kg)	Sr	Hillcrest Prep	Scottsdale, AZ

Head coach

- Hank Plona (Providence)

Assistant coach(es)

- Martin Cross (Western Kentucky)
- Tim MacAllister (Murray State)
- Eric Murphy (Slippery Rock)
- Josh Newman (Arizona State)
- Darryl Jackson (Valparaiso)

Legend

- (C) Team captain
- (S) Suspended
- (I) Ineligible
- (W) Walk-on
- Injured
- Current redshirt

Roster
Last update: December 7, 2024

== Schedule and results ==
Date time, TV	Rank^{#}	Opponent^{#}	Result	Record	High points	High rebounds	High assists	Site (attendance) city, state
Exhibition
October 27, 2024*; 2:00 p.m.		UAB	L 79–88	–	20 – Faye	8 – Faye	4 – Tied	E. A. Diddle Arena (1,724); Bowling Green, KY
Non-conference regular season
November 4, 2024*; 7:00 p.m., CBSSN		Wichita State	L 84–91	0–1	28 – Faye	8 – Faye	4 – McHenry	E. A. Diddle Arena (4,547); Bowling Green, KY
November 9, 2024*; 7:00 p.m., ESPN+		at Grand Canyon	L 72–74	0–2	23 – McHenry	8 – Tied	2 – Tied	Global Credit Union Arena (7,332); Phoenix, AZ
November 12, 2024*; 7:00 p.m., ESPN+		Campbellsville	W 104–76	1–2	23 – Lander	9 – Faye	8 – Jackson	E. A. Diddle Arena (2,312); Bowling Green, KY
November 17, 2024*; 2:00 p.m., ESPN+		Lipscomb	W 66–61	2–2	21 – McHenry	10 – Kalambay	3 – Kalambay	E. A. Diddle Arena (2,712); Bowling Green, KY
November 20, 2024*; 7:00 p.m., ESPN+		Jackson State; BBN Invitational	W 79–62	3–2	15 – Lander	10 – Marshall	5 – Jackson	E. A. Diddle Arena (2,347); Bowling Green, KY
November 26, 2024*; 5:30 p.m., ESPNU		at No. 8 Kentucky; BBN Invitational	L 68–87	3–3	18 – Thedford	8 – Tied	3 – Lander	Rupp Arena (20,049); Lexington, KY
November 30, 2024*; 7:00 p.m., ESPN+		Marshall	W 90–82	4–3	19 – Thedford	6 – Faye	5 – Jackson	E. A. Diddle Arena (3,120); Bowling Green, KY
December 7, 2024*; 1:00 p.m., ESPN+		at Evansville	W 79–65	5–3	19 – Faye	12 – Faye	5 – Bayless	Ford Center (5,316); Evansville, IN
December 10, 2024*; 7:00 p.m., ESPN+		Tennessee State	W 84–60	6–3	19 – Lander	6 – Tied	4 – Lander	E. A. Diddle Arena (2,312); Bowling Green, KY
December 14, 2024*; 1:00 p.m., ESPN+		Murray State	W 81–76 ^{OT}	7–3	29 – McHenry	11 – Marshall Jr.	2 – Kalambay	E. A. Diddle Arena (3,707); Bowling Green, KY
December 17, 2024*; 7:00 p.m., ESPN+		Seattle	W 86–73	8–3	28 – McHenry	8 – Bayless	5 – Kalambay	E. A. Diddle Arena (2,702); Bowling Green, KY
December 21, 2024*; 2:00 p.m., ESPN+		Kentucky Wesleyan	W 91–77	9–3	29 – McHenry	7 – Marshall Jr.	5 – Jackson	E. A. Diddle Arena (2,712); Bowling Green, KY
December 29, 2024*; 7:00 p.m., BTN		at Michigan	L 64–112	9–4	18 – McHenry	5 – Tied	1 – Tied	Crisler Center (12,707); Ann Arbor, MI
Conference regular season
January 2, 2025; 6:00 p.m., CBSSN		at Liberty	W 71–70	10–4 (1–0)	18 – Thedford	8 – Marshall	3 – Tied	Liberty Arena (3,115); Lynchburg, VA
January 4, 2025; 1:00 p.m., ESPN+		at FIU	L 66–85	10–5 (1–1)	18 – Thedford	4 – Tied	4 – Jackson	Ocean Bank Convocation Center (580); Miami, FL
January 9, 2025; 7:00 p.m., ESPN+		Jacksonville State	L 67–73	10–6 (1–2)	24 – Kalambay	8 – Marshall	3 – Tied	E. A. Diddle Arena (2,823); Bowling Green, KY
January 11, 2025; 2:00 p.m., ESPN+		Kennesaw State	W 85–69	11–6 (2–2)	20 – Marshall	8 – Kalambay	3 – Tied	E. A. Diddle Arena (3047); Bowling Green, KY
January 18, 2025; 6:00 p.m., ESPN+		at Middle Tennessee	L 57–71	11–7 (2–3)	16 – McHenry	7 – Keita	3 – Kalambay	Murphy Center (6,512); Murfreesboro, TN
January 23, 2025; 6:00 p.m., CBSSN		at Louisiana Tech	L 67–77	11–8 (2–4)	21 – McHenry	8 – Tied	4 – McHenry	Thomas Assembly Center (1,894); Ruston, LA
January 25, 2025; 2:30 p.m., ESPN+		at Sam Houston	W 75–66	12–8 (3–4)	20 – McHenry	7 – Tied	4 – Bayless	Bernard Johnson Coliseum (847); Huntsville, TX
January 30, 2025; 7:00 p.m., ESPN+		UTEP	W 78–74	13–8 (4–4)	28 – Lander	8 – Marshall	3 – Tied	E. A. Diddle Arena (2,947); Bowling Green, KY
February 1, 2025; 2:00 p.m., ESPN+		New Mexico State	W 101–69	14–8 (5–4)	27 – McHenry	7 – Marshall	5 – Lander	E. A. Diddle Arena (3,745); Bowling Green, KY
February 6, 2025; 6:00 p.m., ESPN+		at Kennesaw State	L 69–76	14–9 (5–5)	30 – McHenry	6 – Tied	1 – Tied	KSU Convocation Center (2,242); Kennesaw, GA
February 8, 2025; 4:00 p.m., ESPN+		at Jacksonville State	L 83–85	14–10 (5–6)	30 – Lander	7 – Marshall	4 – Bayless	Pete Mathews Coliseum (2,169); Jacksonville, AL
February 15, 2025; 7:00 p.m., CBSSN		Middle Tennessee	L 77–87	14–11 (5–7)	20 – McHenry	10 – Keita	3 – Tied	E. A. Diddle Arena (4,647); Bowling Green, KY
February 20, 2025; 8:00 p.m., ESPNU		Sam Houston	L 62–78	14–12 (5–8)	11 – Tied	9 – Keita	5 – Jackson	E. A. Diddle Arena (2,945); Bowling Green, KY
February 22, 2025; 7:00 p.m., ESPN+		Louisiana Tech	W 64–63	15–12 (6–8)	27 – Bayless	6 – Marshall	4 – Tied	E. A. Diddle Arena (4,123); Bowling Green, KY
February 27, 2025; 8:00 p.m., CBSSN		at UTEP	W 80–73	16–12 (7–8)	16 – Marshall	11 – Lander	3 – Bayless	Don Haskins Center (4,322); El Paso, TX
March 1, 2025; 8:00 p.m., ESPN+		at New Mexico State	L 47–65	16–13 (7–9)	16 – Marshall	6 – Odiahi	3 – Tied	Pan American Center (4,864); Las Cruces, NM
March 6, 2025; 7:00 p.m., ESPN+		FIU	W 76–67	17–13 (8–9)	20 – McHenry	9 – Marshall	5 – McHenry	E. A. Diddle Arena (3,645); Bowling Green, KY
March 8, 2025; 2:00 p.m., ESPN+		Liberty	L 61–90	17–14 (8–10)	18 – Lander	9 – Marshall	3 – Lander	E. A. Diddle Arena (4,247); Bowling Green, KY
Conference USA tournament
March 11, 2025; 8:00 p.m., ESPN+	(7)	vs. (10) FIU; First round	L 61–64	17–15	12 – Bayless	8 – Marshall Jr.	2 – Bayless	Von Braun Center (1,244); Huntsville, AL
*Non-conference game. ^{#}Rankings from AP poll. (#) Tournament seedings in parentheses. All times are in Central.
