= 2024–25 New Mexico State Aggies men's basketball team =

American college basketball season

2024–25 New Mexico State Aggies men's basketball
- Conference: Conference USA
- Record: 17–15 (10–8 CUSA)
- Head coach: Jason Hooten (2nd season)
- Assistant coaches: Payne Andrus; Terryonte Thomas; Preston Laird; Rusty Elmore; Shunn Buchanan
- Home arena: Pan American Center

2024–25 Conference USA men's basketball standings
	Conf.				Overall
Team	W		L	PCT	W		L	PCT
Liberty †	13	–	5	.722	28	–	7	.800
Jacksonville State	12	–	6	.667	23	–	13	.639
Middle Tennessee	12	–	6	.667	22	–	12	.647
Kennesaw State	10	–	8	.556	19	–	14	.576
New Mexico State	10	–	8	.556	17	–	15	.531
Louisiana Tech	9	–	9	.500	20	–	12	.625
Western Kentucky	8	–	10	.444	17	–	15	.531
UTEP	7	–	11	.389	18	–	15	.545
Sam Houston	6	–	12	.333	13	–	19	.406
FIU	3	–	15	.167	10	–	23	.303
† 2025 CUSA tournament winner

The 2024–25 New Mexico State Aggies men's basketball team represented New Mexico State University in the 2024–25 NCAA Division I men's basketball season. The Aggies, led by second-year head coach Jason Hooten, played their home games at the Pan American Center in Las Cruces, New Mexico as members of Conference USA.

== Previous season ==
The 2023–24 New Mexico State Aggies men's basketball team finished 13-19 (7–9) in Conference USA play to finish in a tie for 4th place in their first year. As the No. 6 seed in the 2024 Conference USA men's basketball tournament, they lost to the No. 3 seeded 2023–24 Western Kentucky Hilltoppers basketball team, 89–69.

== Offseason ==
=== Departures ===
Name	Number	Pos.	Height	Weight	Year	Hometown	Reason for departure
Jaylin Jackson-Posey	0	G	6'2"	196	Junior	Midland, TX	Transferred to Texas Southern
Kasoi Ezeagu	1	F	6'10"	255	Senior	Bramton, ON	Graduated/signed with Rapla KK
Jordan Rawls	2	G	6'2"	185	Graduate Student	Chattanooga, TN	Graduated/signed with Ballincollig Basketball Club
Brandon Suggs	4	G	6'6"	185	Graduate Student	Powder Springs, GA	Early exit pro
Keylon Dorsey	5	G	6'5"	185	Freshman	Houston, TX	Transferred to Kilgore College
Tanahj Pettway	9	G	6'2"	185	Senior	Worcester, MA	Transferred to Prairie View A&M
Femi Odukale	11	G	6'6"	205	Senior	Brooklyn, NY	Transferred to Minnesota
Lewis Duarte	12	G	6'5"	185	Freshman	Santo Domingo, DR	Removed from roster/signed with Reales de La Vega
Yaak Yaak	14	F	6'11"	--	Freshman	Adelaide, Australia	Transferred
Jonathan Kanayanga	24	F	6'9"	225	Graduate Student	Kinshasa, Congo	Graduated
Clarence Jackson	25	F	6'7"	225	Senior	Dublin, GA	Graduated/early exit pro/signed to play with Team Milwaukee
Davion Bradford	26	F	7'0"	270	Senior	St. Louis, MO	In-season transfer out/transferred to East Tennessee State

=== Incoming transfers ===
Name	Number	Pos.	Height	Weight	Year	Hometown	Previous college
Dionte Bostick	0	G	6'2"	185	Senior	Clearwater, FL	Cal State Northridge
Zawdie Jackson	2	G	6'0"	185	Senior	Stone Mountain, GA	West Georgia
Carl Cherenfant	5	G	6'5"	195	Sophomore	Pompano Beach, FL	Memphis
Peter Filipovity	12	F	6'7"	--	Graduate Student	Kaposvár, Hungary	Maine
Nate Tshimanga	19	F	6'10"	235	Senior	Montreal, Quebec, Canada	Utah Valley
Azavier Johnson	20	G	6'5"	202	Junior	Las Vegas, NV	New Mexico JC
Emmanuel Tshimanga	25	F	7'0"	270	Graduate Student	Montreal, Quebec, Canada	UC San Diego
Edward Nnamoko	34	F	6'10"	225	Junior	Lagos, Nigeria	Georgia State

=== 2024 recruiting class ===
College recruiting information
Name	Hometown	School	Height	Weight	Commit date
Gabe Pickens; G	Phoenix, AZ	Dream City Christian	6 ft 0 in (1.83 m)	200 lb (91 kg)	Jan 25, 2024
Gabe Pickens; G	Recruit ratings: 247Sports:				
Jae'Coby Osborne; F	Missouri City, TX	Bella Vista Prep	6 ft 6 in (1.98 m)	185 lb (84 kg)	Nov 11, 2023
Jae'Coby Osborne; F	Recruit ratings: 247Sports:				
Marvin Cox; F	Clovis, NM	Clovis High School	6 ft 7 in (2.01 m)	170 lb (77 kg)	
Marvin Cox; F	Recruit ratings: No ratings found				
Overall recruit ranking:
Note: In many cases, Scout, Rivals, 247Sports, On3, and ESPN may conflict in their listings of height and weight.; In these cases, the average was taken. ESPN grades are on a 100-point scale.; Sources: "2024 New Mexico State Basketball Commits". ESPN.

== Roster ==
2024–25 New Mexico State Aggies men's basketball team
Players
Coaches

Pos.	#	Name	Height	Weight	Year	Previous school	Hometown
G	0	Dionte Bostick	6 ft 2 in (1.88 m)	185 lb (84 kg)	Sr	Cal State Northridge	Clearwater, FL
G	1	Gabe Pickens	6 ft 0 in (1.83 m)	200 lb (91 kg)	Fr	Dream City Christian	Phoenix, AZ
G	2	Zawdie Jackson	6 ft 0 in (1.83 m)	185 lb (84 kg)	Sr	West Georgia	Stone Mountain, GA
G	3	Christian Cook	6 ft 2 in (1.88 m)	175 lb (79 kg)	Sr	Northeastern State	Oklahoma City, OK
F	4	Jae'Coby Osborne	6 ft 6 in (1.98 m)	185 lb (84 kg)	Fr	Bella Vista Prep	Missouri City, TX
G	5	Carl Cherenfant	6 ft 5 in (1.96 m)	195 lb (88 kg)	So	Memphis	Pompano Beach, FL
F	6	Christopher Biekeu	6 ft 7 in (2.01 m)	235 lb (107 kg)	GS	Towson	Montréal, Quebec, Canada
F	10	Marvin Cox (W)	6 ft 7 in (2.01 m)	170 lb (77 kg)	Fr	Clovis HS	Clovis, NM
F	12	Peter Filipovity	6 ft 7 in (2.01 m)	—	GS	Maine	Kaposvár, Hungary
G	13	Jaden Harris	6 ft 4 in (1.93 m)	190 lb (86 kg)	Sr	South Plains College	Atlanta, GA
F	19	Nate Tshimanga	6 ft 10 in (2.08 m)	235 lb (107 kg)	Sr	Utah Valley	Montréal, Quebec, Canada
G	20	Azavier Johnson	6 ft 5 in (1.96 m)	202 lb (92 kg)	Jr	New Mexico JC	Las Vegas, NV
F	21	Robert Carpenter	6 ft 7 in (2.01 m)	210 lb (95 kg)	GS	Mississippi Valley State	Detroit, MI
F	25	Emmanuel Tshimanga	7 ft 0 in (2.13 m)	270 lb (122 kg)	GS	UC San Diego	Montréal, Quebec, Canada
F	34	Edward Nnamoko	6 ft 10 in (2.08 m)	225 lb (102 kg)	Jr	Georgia State	Lagos, Nigeria

Head coach

- Jason Hooten (Tarleton State)

Assistant coach(es)

- Payne Andrus (MidAmerica Nazarene)
- Terryonte Thomas (Sam Houston State)
- Preston Laird (Memphis)
- Rusty Elmore (Middle Tennessee)
- Shunn Buchanan (New Mexico State)

Legend

- (C) Team captain
- (S) Suspended
- (I) Ineligible
- (W) Walk-on
- Injured
- Current redshirt

Roster
Last update: October 17, 2024

== Schedule and results ==
Date time, TV	Rank^{#}	Opponent^{#}	Result	Record	High points	High rebounds	High assists	Site (attendance) city, state
Exhibition
October 28, 2024*; 7:00 p.m., ESPN+		Western New Mexico	W 77–56		22 – Carpenter	8 – Carpenter	6 – Jackson	Pan American Center (1,042); Las Cruces, NM
Non-conference regular season
November 4, 2024*; 7:00 p.m., ESPN+		New Mexico Highlands	W 93–57	1–0	18 – Carpenter	12 – N. Tshimanga	5 – Jackson	Pan American Center (3,770); Las Cruces, NM
November 9, 2024*; 7:00 p.m., ESPN+		at Utah Tech; C-USA/WAC Alliance	W 75–63	2–0	24 – Jackson	10 – N. Tshimanga	7 – Jackson	Burns Arena (1,392); St. George, UT
November 14, 2024*; 7:30 p.m., ESPN+		Texas A&M–Corpus Christi	W 83–82	3–0	13 – Bostick	10 – Tied	4 – Jackson	Pan American Center (4,114); Las Cruces, NM
November 20, 2024*; 5:00 p.m., ESPN+		at Dayton	L 53–74	3–1	15 – Filipovity	9 – Carpenter	3 – Pickens	UD Arena (13,407); Dayton, OH
November 23, 2024*; 3:00 p.m., MW Network		at UNLV; Arizona Tip-Off campus site game	L 65–72	3–2	14 – Pickens	13 – Carpenter	2 – Pickens	Thomas & Mack Center (4,850); Paradise, NV
November 29, 2024*; 1:30 p.m.		vs. Pepperdine; Arizona Tip-Off Desert Division semifinals	L 70–82	3–3	15 – Filipovity	11 – Filipovity	6 – Jackson	Mullett Arena (814); Tempe, AZ
November 30, 2024*; 12:00 p.m.		vs. Bowling Green; Arizona Tip-Off Desert Division 3rd place game	L 60–61	3–4	18 – Harris	9 – Tied	4 – Tied	Mullett Arena; Tempe, AZ
December 4, 2024*; 7:00 p.m., ESPN+		Abilene Christian; C-USA/WAC Alliance	L 70–78	3–5	13 – Carpenter	5 – Carpenter	2 – Tied	Pan American Center (4,296); Las Cruces, NM
December 7, 2024*; 7:00 p.m., MW Network		at New Mexico; Rio Grande Rivalry	W 89–83 ^{OT}	4–5	27 – Cook	8 – Tied	7 – Jackson	The Pit (15,411); Albuquerque, NM
December 12, 2024*; 6:00 p.m., SECN+/ESPN+		at Texas	L 67–91	4–6	22 – Cook	7 – Filipovity	4 – Jackson	Moody Center (10,600); Austin, TX
December 16, 2024*; 7:00 p.m., ESPN+		Southern Utah	W 72–69	5–6	19 – Cook	9 – Filipovity	4 – Filipovity	Pan American Center (3,998); Las Cruces, NM
December 19, 2024*; 7:00 p.m., ESPN+		Northern New Mexico	W 87–50	6–6	13 – Tied	10 – Tied	3 – Tied	Pan American Center (3,745); Las Cruces, NM
December 28, 2024*; 4:00 p.m., ESPN+		Southwest	W 85–52	7–6	11 – Tied	6 – Tied	9 – Jackson	Pan American Center (3,896); Las Cruces, NM
Conference USA regular season
January 2, 2025; 7:00 p.m., ESPN+		Sam Houston	W 75–71	8–6 (1–0)	25 – Cook	10 – Carpenter	4 – Tied	Pan American Center (3,913); Las Cruces, NM
January 4, 2025; 2:00 p.m., ESPN+		Louisiana Tech	W 78–48	9–6 (2–0)	19 – Cook	8 – Filipovity	6 – Jackson	Pan American Center (4,004); Las Cruces, NM
January 11, 2025; 7:00 p.m., ESPN+		at UTEP; Battle of I-10	W 85–57	10–6 (3–0)	18 – Jackson	9 – Filipovity	5 – Jackson	Don Haskins Center (12,000); El Paso, TX
January 16, 2025; 5:00 p.m., ESPN+		at FIU	W 59–52	11–6 (4–0)	13 – Tied	8 – Filipovity	4 – Bostick	Ocean Bank Convocation Center (1,535); Miami, FL
January 18, 2025; 5:00 p.m., ESPN+		at Liberty	L 60–68	11–7 (4–1)	17 – Cook	12 – Filipovity	3 – Tied	Liberty Arena (3,776); Lynchburg, VA
January 23, 2025; 7:00 p.m., ESPN+		Kennesaw State	L 56–69	11–8 (4–2)	16 – Carpenter	10 – Filipovity	5 – Pickens	Pan American Center (4,599); Las Cruces, NM
January 25, 2025; 7:00 p.m., ESPN+		Jacksonville State	L 59–65	11–9 (4–3)	16 – Carpenter	17 – Filipovity	3 – Cook	Pan American Center (4,919); Las Cruces, NM
January 30, 2025; 5:30 p.m., ESPN+		at Middle Tennessee	W 61–57	12–9 (5–3)	16 – Carpenter	9 – Filipovity	3 – Tied	Murphy Center (3,307); Murfreesboro, TN
February 1, 2025; 1:00 p.m., ESPN+		at Western Kentucky	L 69–101	12–10 (5–4)	22 – Filipovity	8 – Filipovity	3 – Jackson	E. A. Diddle Arena (3,745); Bowling Green, KY
February 8, 2025; 7:00 p.m., ESPN+		UTEP; Battle of I-10	L 63–66	12–11 (5–5)	13 – Tshimanga	10 – Carpenter	2 – Tied	Pan American Center (8,941); Las Cruces, NM
February 13, 2025; 7:00 p.m., ESPN+		Liberty	L 54–64	12–12 (5–6)	18 – Jackson	6 – Osborne	3 – Pickens	Pan American Center (4,509); Las Cruces, NM
February 15, 2025; 7:00 p.m., ESPN+		FIU	W 76–48	13–12 (6–6)	21 – Jackson	8 – N. Tshimanga	4 – Tied	Pan American Center (13,274); Las Cruces, NM
February 20, 2025; 5:00 p.m., ESPN+		at Jacksonville State	W 61–52	14–12 (7–6)	20 – Filipovity	12 – Filipovity	2 – Tied	Pete Mathews Coliseum (2,322); Jacksonville, AL
February 22, 2025; 3:00 p.m., ESPN+		at Kennesaw State	W 60–49	15–12 (8–6)	20 – Jackson	9 – Filipovity	5 – Bostick	Convocation Center (2,103); Kennesaw, GA
February 27, 2025; 7:00 p.m., ESPN+		Middle Tennessee	L 66–71	15–13 (8–7)	24 – Cook	7 – Carpenter	6 – Jackson	Pan American Center (5,253); Las Cruces, NM
March 1, 2025; 7:00 p.m., ESPN+		Western Kentucky	W 65–47	16–13 (9–7)	16 – Filipovity	11 – Filipovity	3 – Pickens	Pan American Center (4,864); Las Cruces, NM
March 6, 2025; 5:30 p.m., ESPN+		at Louisiana Tech	W 67–55	17–13 (10–7)	19 – Filipovity	12 – Filipovity	3 – Pickens	Thomas Assembly Center (1,659); Ruston, LA
March 8, 2025; 1:30 p.m., ESPN+		at Sam Houston	L 69–76	17–14 (10–8)	20 – Carpenter	7 – Tied	2 – Tied	Bernard Johnson Coliseum (1,230); Huntsville, TX
Conference USA tournament
March 13, 2025; 4:30 p.m., ESPN+	(5)	vs. (4) Kennesaw State; Quarterfinals	L 77–80	17–15	21 – Tied	6 – Tied	3 – Tied	Von Braun Center (2,770); Huntsville, AL
*Non-conference game. ^{#}Rankings from AP Poll. (#) Tournament seedings in parentheses. All times are in Mountain.
