= 2025 Conference USA men's basketball tournament =

American college basketball tournament

- Classification: Division I
- Season: 2024–25
- Teams: 10
- Site: Propst Arena; Huntsville, Alabama
- Champions: Liberty (1st title)
- Winning coach: Ritchie McKay (1st title)
- Television: ESPN+, CBSSN

2024–25 Conference USA men's basketball standings
	Conf.				Overall
Team	W		L	PCT	W		L	PCT
Liberty †	13	–	5	.722	28	–	7	.800
Jacksonville State	12	–	6	.667	23	–	13	.639
Middle Tennessee	12	–	6	.667	22	–	12	.647
Kennesaw State	10	–	8	.556	19	–	14	.576
New Mexico State	10	–	8	.556	17	–	15	.531
Louisiana Tech	9	–	9	.500	20	–	12	.625
Western Kentucky	8	–	10	.444	17	–	15	.531
UTEP	7	–	11	.389	18	–	15	.545
Sam Houston	6	–	12	.333	13	–	19	.406
FIU	3	–	15	.167	10	–	23	.303
† 2025 CUSA tournament winner

The 2025 Conference USA men's basketball tournament was a postseason men's basketball tournament that completed the 2024–25 season in the Conference USA. The tournament was held at the Propst Arena in Huntsville, Alabama, from March 11–15, 2025. The winner, Liberty, received the conference's automatic bid to the 2025 NCAA Tournament.

== Seeds ==
All of the conference's ten teams competed in the tournament. The top six teams received byes to the quarterfinals. Teams were seeded by record within the conference, with a tiebreaker system to seed teams with identical conference records.

Seed	School	Conference record	Tiebreaker
1	Liberty	13–5	
2	Jacksonville State	12–6	1–1 vs. Liberty
3	Middle Tennessee	12–6	0–2 vs. Liberty
4	Kennesaw State	10–8	1–1 vs. Liberty
5	New Mexico State	10–8	0–2 vs. Liberty
6	Louisiana Tech	9–9	
7	Western Kentucky	8–10	
8	UTEP	7–11	
9	Sam Houston	6–12	
10	FIU	3–15	

== Schedule ==
Game	Time	Matchup	Score	Television	Attendance
First round – March 11, 2025
1	5:30 pm	No. 8 UTEP vs. No. 9 Sam Houston	79–65	ESPN+	
2	8:00 pm	No. 7 Western Kentucky vs. No. 10 FIU	61–64	ESPN+	
Quarterfinals – March 12, 2025
3	5:30 pm	No. 1 Liberty vs. No. 8 UTEP	81–60	ESPN+	
4	8:00 pm	No. 2 Jacksonville State vs. No. 10 FIU	65–56	ESPN+	
Quarterfinals – March 13, 2025
5	5:30 pm	No. 4 Kennesaw State vs. No. 5 New Mexico State	80–77	ESPN+	
6	8:00 pm	No. 3 Middle Tennessee vs. No. 6 Louisiana Tech	77–75 ^{2OT}	ESPN+	
Semifinals – March 14, 2025
7	11:30 am	No. 1 Liberty vs. No. 4 Kennesaw State	81–79	CBSSN	
8	2:00 pm	No. 2 Jacksonville State vs. No. 3 Middle Tennessee	70–68	CBSSN	
Championship – March 15, 2025
9	7:30 pm	No. 1 Liberty vs No. 2 Jacksonville State	79–67	CBSSN	
*Game times in CDT. ()-Rankings denote tournament seeding.

== Bracket ==
First round Tuesday, March 11
8	UTEP	79
9	Sam Houston	65
7	Western Kentucky	61
10	Florida International	64

Quarterfinals; Wednesday, March 12; Thursday, March 13
1	Liberty	81
8	UTEP	60
4	Kennesaw State	80
5	New Mexico State	77
2	Jacksonville State	65
10	Florida International	56
3	Middle Tennessee	77^{2OT}
6	Louisiana Tech	75

Semifinals; Friday, March 14
1	Liberty	81
4	Kennesaw State	79
2	Jacksonville State	70
3	Middle Tennessee	68

Championship; Saturday, March 15
1	Liberty	79
2	Jacksonville State	67

== See also ==
- 2025 Conference USA women's basketball tournament
