= 1985–86 Northeast Louisiana Indians men's basketball team =

American college basketball season

1985–86 Northeast Louisiana Indians men's basketball

Southland Regular season champions Southland tournament champions

NCAA tournament
- Conference: Southland Conference
- Record: 20–10 (9–3 Southland)
- Head coach: Mike Vining (5th season)
- Home arena: Fant–Ewing Coliseum

1985–86 Southland Conference men's basketball standings
	Conf.				Overall
Team	W		L	PCT	W		L	PCT
NE Louisiana †	9	–	3	.750	20	–	10	.667
McNeese State	8	–	4	.667	21	–	11	.656
Arkansas State	7	–	5	.583	18	–	11	.621
Lamar	6	–	6	.500	18	–	12	.600
Louisiana Tech	6	–	6	.500	20	–	14	.588
North Texas State	4	–	8	.333	10	–	18	.357
UT Arlington	2	–	10	.167	12	–	18	.400
† 1986 Southland Conference tournament winner Rankings from AP Poll

The 1985–86 Northeast Louisiana Indians men's basketball team represented the University of Louisiana at Monroe in the 1985–86 NCAA Division I men's basketball season. The Indiana, led by head coach Mike Vining, played their home games at Fant–Ewing Coliseum in Monroe, Louisiana, as members of the Southland Conference. They finished the season 20–10, 9–3 in Southland play to win the regular season conference title. They followed that success by winning the Southland tournament to earn an automatic bid to the NCAA tournament as No. 13 seed in the West region. Northeast Louisiana fell to No. 4 seed UNLV in the opening round, 74–51.

== Roster ==
1985–86 Northeast Louisiana Indians men's basketball team
Players	Coaches
Pos. / # / Name / Height / Weight / Year / Hometown; F / / Bobby Jenkins / 6 ft 6 in (1.98 m) / — / Sr	Head coach: Mike Vining; Assistant coach(es) Legend: (C) Team captain; (S) Suspended; (I) Ineligible; (W) Walk-on; Injured; Current redshirt

== Schedule and results ==
Date time, TV	Rank^{#}	Opponent^{#}	Result	Record	Site (attendance) city, state
Regular season
Feb 27, 1986		Louisiana Tech	W 59–43	18–9 (9–3)	Fant-Ewing Coliseum; Monroe, Louisiana
Southland tournament
Mar 5, 1986*		Louisiana Tech; Semifinals	W 57–56	19–9	Fant-Ewing Coliseum; Monroe, Louisiana
Mar 6, 1986*		McNeese State; Championship game	W 59–57	20–9	Fant-Ewing Coliseum; Monroe, Louisiana
NCAA Tournament
Mar 14, 1986*	(13 W)	vs. (4 W) No. 11 Nevada-Las Vegas; First Round	L 51–74	20–10	Long Beach Arena; Long Beach, California
*Non-conference game. ^{#}Rankings from AP Poll. (#) Tournament seedings in parentheses. W=West. All times are in Central.

== Awards and honors ==
- Bobby Jenkins – Southland Conference Player of the Year
