= 1995–96 Northeast Louisiana Indians men's basketball team =

American college basketball season

1995–96 Northeast Louisiana Indians men's basketball

Southland Regular season champions Southland tournament champions

NCAA tournament
- Conference: Southland Conference
- Record: 16–14 (13–5 Southland)
- Head coach: Mike Vining (15th season)
- Home arena: Fant–Ewing Coliseum

1995–96 Southland Conference men's basketball standings
	Conf.				Overall
Team	W		L	PCT	W		L	PCT
Northeast Louisiana †	13	–	5	.722	16	–	14	.533
North Texas	12	–	6	.667	15	–	13	.536
UTSA	12	–	6	.667	14	–	14	.500
Stephen F. Austin	11	–	7	.611	17	–	11	.607
McNeese State	11	–	7	.611	15	–	12	.556
Sam Houston State	9	–	9	.500	11	–	16	.407
Southwest Texas State	7	–	11	.389	11	–	15	.423
Texas–Arlington	7	–	11	.389	11	–	15	.423
Nicholls State	5	–	13	.278	5	–	21	.192
Northwestern State	3	–	15	.167	5	–	21	.192
† 1996 Southland tournament winner Rankings from AP Poll

The 1995–96 Northeast Louisiana Indians men's basketball team represented the Northeast Louisiana University in the 1995–96 NCAA Division I men's basketball season. The Indians, led by head coach Mike Vining, played their home games at Fant–Ewing Coliseum in Monroe, Louisiana, as members of the Southland Conference. They finished the season 16–14, 13–5 in Southland play to win the regular season league title. They followed the regular season by winning the Southland tournament to earn an automatic bid to the NCAA tournament as No. 15 seed in the Midwest region. Northeast Louisiana fell to No. 2 seed Wake Forest in the opening round, 62–50.

== Roster ==
1995–96 Northeast Louisiana Indians men's basketball team
Players	Coaches
Pos. / # / Name / Height / Weight / Year / Hometown; G / / Paul Marshall / 6 ft 2 in (1.88 m) / — / Sr	Head coach: Mike Vining; Assistant coach(es) Legend: (C) Team captain; (S) Suspended; (I) Ineligible; (W) Walk-on; Injured; Current redshirt

== Schedule and results ==
Date time, TV	Rank^{#}	Opponent^{#}	Result	Record	Site (attendance) city, state
Regular season
Southland tournament
NCAA Tournament
Mar 15, 1996*	(15 MW)	vs. (2 MW) No. 9 Wake Forest; First round	L 50–62	16–14	Bradley Center; Milwaukee, Wisconsin
*Non-conference game. ^{#}Rankings from AP poll. (#) Tournament seedings in parentheses. SE=Southeast. All times are in Central.

== Awards and honors ==
- Paul Marshall – Southland Player of the Year
