= 2024–25 Sam Houston Bearkats men's basketball team =

American college basketball season

2024–25 Sam Houston Bearkats men's basketball
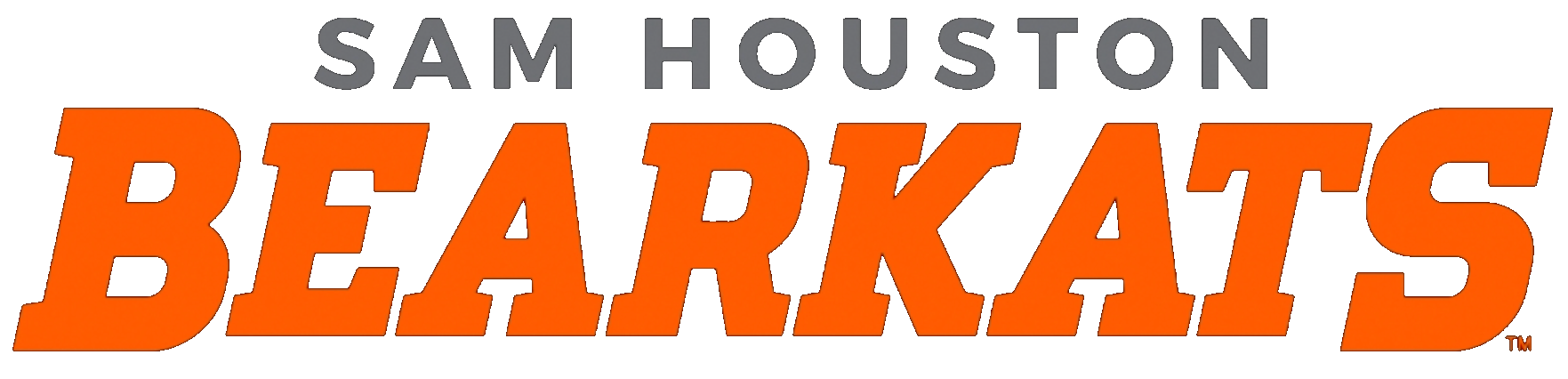
- Conference: Conference USA
- Record: 13–19 (6–12 CUSA)
- Head coach: Chris Mudge (2nd season)
- Associate head coach: Justin Bailey (4th season)
- Assistant coaches: Brendan Foley (2nd season); Jake White (2nd season); Anthony Fobb (2nd season)
- Home arena: Bernard Johnson Coliseum

2024–25 Conference USA men's basketball standings
	Conf.				Overall
Team	W		L	PCT	W		L	PCT
Liberty †	13	–	5	.722	28	–	7	.800
Jacksonville State	12	–	6	.667	23	–	13	.639
Middle Tennessee	12	–	6	.667	22	–	12	.647
Kennesaw State	10	–	8	.556	19	–	14	.576
New Mexico State	10	–	8	.556	17	–	15	.531
Louisiana Tech	9	–	9	.500	20	–	12	.625
Western Kentucky	8	–	10	.444	17	–	15	.531
UTEP	7	–	11	.389	18	–	15	.545
Sam Houston	6	–	12	.333	13	–	19	.406
FIU	3	–	15	.167	10	–	23	.303
† 2025 CUSA tournament winner

The 2024–25 Sam Houston Bearkats men's basketball team represented Sam Houston State University in the 2024–25 NCAA Division I men's basketball season. The Bearkats, led by second-year head coach Chris Mudge, played their home games at the Bernard Johnson Coliseum in Huntsville, Texas as second-year members of the Conference USA.

== Previous season ==
The Bearkats finished the 2023–24 season 21–12, 13–3 in C-USA play to win the Conference USA championship. They defeated FIU in the quarterfinals of the C-USA tournament before losing to UTEP in the semifinals.

== Offseason ==
=== Departures ===
Name	Number	Pos.	Height	Weight	Year	Hometown	Reason for departure
Owen McGlashan	0	G/F	6'7"	210	GS Senior	Marlton, NJ	Graduated
Davon Barnes	2	G	6'5"	215	Junior	Memphis, TN	Transferred to Ole Miss
Anthony Wrzeszcz	4	G	6'3"	185	Sophomore	Gdynia, Poland	Transferred to McMaster
Bryce Cook	11	G	5'7"	160	Freshman	Arlington, TX	Transferred to Texas A&M–Kingsville
Jaden Ray	13	G	5'10"	165	Senior	Midwest City, OK	Graduated
Kinglsey Ijeoma	14	F	6'8"	200	Junior	Houston, TX	Transferred to Livingstone College
Lewis Rowe	21	F	6'10"	250	Junior	Adelaide, Australia	Transferred to St. Edward's
Derrick Brown	24	G	6'0"	175	Junior	Houston, TX	Walk-on; transferred
Souleymane Doumbia	31	C	6'11"	230	Senior	Abidjan, Ivory Coast	Graduated

=== Incoming transfers ===
Name	Number	Pos.	Height	Weight	Year	Hometown	Previous school
Brennen Burns	0	G	5'10"	175	Senior	Bethany, OK	Southeastern Oklahoma State
Dorian Finister	2	G	6'5"	190	Junior	New Orleans, LA	Kansas State
Kalifa Sakho	34	F	6'11"	220	Senior	Rouen, France	Utah State
Josiah Hammons	57	G	6'2"	180	Senior	Chicago, IL	Incarnate Word

=== 2024 recruiting class ===
College recruiting information
Name	Hometown	School	Height	Weight	Commit date
Jaxson Ford #31 PF	Prosper, TX	Link Academy	6 ft 7 in (2.01 m)	220 lb (100 kg)	Oct 22, 2023
Jaxson Ford #31 PF	Recruit ratings: Rivals: 247Sports: ESPN: (79)				
Erik Taylor; CG	Orlando, FL	The Rock School	6 ft 1 in (1.85 m)	175 lb (79 kg)	Jul 20, 2023
Erik Taylor; CG	Recruit ratings: Rivals: 247Sports: ESPN: (NR)				
Cheikh Ndiaye; C	Fort Lauderdale, FL	Prestige Worldwide Sports Academy	6 ft 10 in (2.08 m)	215 lb (98 kg)	May 27, 2024
Cheikh Ndiaye; C	Recruit ratings: Rivals: 247Sports: ESPN: (NR)				
Overall recruit ranking:
Note: In many cases, Scout, Rivals, 247Sports, On3, and ESPN may conflict in their listings of height and weight.; In these cases, the average was taken. ESPN grades are on a 100-point scale.; Sources: "2024 Team Ranking". Rivals.

=== 2025 recruiting class ===
College recruiting information (2025)
Name	Hometown	School	Height	Weight	Commit date
Jacobe Coleman; SG	Dallas, TX	Dynamic Prep	6 ft 3 in (1.91 m)	180 lb (82 kg)	Sep 2, 2024
Jacobe Coleman; SG	Recruit ratings: Rivals: 247Sports: ESPN: (NR)				
Nathan Nguyen; PG	Houston, TX	Saint Thomas' Episcopal School	6 ft 1 in (1.85 m)	N/A	Sep 11, 2024
Nathan Nguyen; PG	Recruit ratings: Rivals: 247Sports: ESPN: (NR)				
Jacob Walker; PG	Cordova, TN	Sunrise Christian Academy	6 ft 0 in (1.83 m)	165 lb (75 kg)	Sep 26, 2024
Jacob Walker; PG	Recruit ratings: Rivals: 247Sports: ESPN: (NR)				
Matt Dann; C	Oakville, ON	Fort Erie International Academy	7 ft 0 in (2.13 m)	N/A	Oct 12, 2024
Matt Dann; C	Recruit ratings: Rivals: 247Sports: ESPN: (NR)				
Overall recruit ranking:
Note: In many cases, Scout, Rivals, 247Sports, On3, and ESPN may conflict in their listings of height and weight.; In these cases, the average was taken. ESPN grades are on a 100-point scale.; Sources: "2025 Team Ranking". Rivals.

== Roster ==
2024–25 Sam Houston State Bearkats men's basketball team
Players
Coaches

Pos.	#	Name	Height	Weight	Year	Previous school	Hometown
G	0	Brennen Burns	5 ft 10 in (1.78 m)	180 lb (82 kg)	Sr	East Central HS; Southeastern Oklahoma State	Bethany, OK
G	1	CJ Beaumont	6 ft 8 in (2.03 m)	210 lb (95 kg)	So	Palm Beach Prep	West Palm Beach, FL
G	2	Dorian Finister	6 ft 5 in (1.96 m)	185 lb (84 kg)	Jr	Carver HS; Kansas State	New Orleans, LA
G	3	Lamar Wilkerson	6 ft 5 in (1.96 m)	205 lb (93 kg)	Sr	Ashdown HS; Three Rivers College	Ashdown, AR
G	5	Marcus Boykin	6 ft 1 in (1.85 m)	190 lb (86 kg)	Sr	Trinity Christian School; Barton College	Clinton, NC
F	6	Jaxson Ford	6 ft 7 in (2.01 m)	215 lb (98 kg)	Fr	Link Academy	Prosper, TX
G	10	Damon Nicholas Jr.	6 ft 4 in (1.93 m)	195 lb (88 kg)	Sr	Duncanville HS	Ducanville, TX
G	11	Wade Neyland (W)	6 ft 3 in (1.91 m)	200 lb (91 kg)	Fr	Centerville HS	Centerville, TX
G	12	Erik Taylor	6 ft 1 in (1.85 m)	180 lb (82 kg)	Fr	The Rock School	Orlando, FL
G	22	Jackson Rogers (W)	6 ft 3 in (1.91 m)	205 lb (93 kg)	Fr	Wylie HS	Murphy, TX
F	23	Cheikh Ndiaye	6 ft 10 in (2.08 m)	215 lb (98 kg)	Fr	Prestige Worldwide Sports Academy	Louga, Senegal
F	25	Cameron Huefner	6 ft 8 in (2.03 m)	230 lb (104 kg)	Sr	St. Peter's College; Pittsburg State	Adelaide, Australia
F	34	Kalifa Sakho	6 ft 11 in (2.11 m)	230 lb (104 kg)	Sr	Utah State	Rouen, France
F	40	Kian Scroggins	6 ft 7 in (2.01 m)	235 lb (107 kg)	Sr	Raymore–Peculiar HS	Raymore, MO
G	57	Josiah Hammons	6 ft 2 in (1.88 m)	180 lb (82 kg)	Sr	Curie HS; Incarnate Word	Chicago, IL

Head coach

- Chris Mudge (Texas)

Assistant coach(es)

- Justin Bailey (UT Permian Basin)
- Brendan Foley (Kansas State)
- Jake White (UT Tyler)
- Anthony Fobb (Southeastern Louisiana)

Legend

- (C) Team captain
- (S) Suspended
- (I) Ineligible
- (W) Walk-on
- Injured
- Current redshirt

Roster

== Schedule and results ==
Date time, TV	Rank^{#}	Opponent^{#}	Result	Record	High points	High rebounds	High assists	Site (attendance) city, state
Exhibition
October 13, 2024*; 5:00 p.m.		vs. Prairie View A&M; Charity Exhibition Game	W 94–87		–	–	–	Delmar Fieldhouse; Houston, TX
Non-conference regular season
November 4, 2024*; 7:00 p.m., MSN		at Nevada	L 75−91	0−1	17 – Boykin	8 – Finister	4 – Tied	Lawlor Events Center (8,023); Reno, NV
November 9, 2024*; 7:00 p.m., ESPN+		at Tarleton State	W 91–62	1–1	15 – Tied	11 – Finister	8 – Burns	Wisdom Gymnasium (1,487); Stephenville, TX
November 12, 2024*; 7:00 p.m., ESPN+		at No. 12 Baylor	L 67–104	1–2	19 – Wilkerson	4 – Tied	5 – Boykin	Foster Pavilion (7,500); Waco, TX
November 17, 2024*; 4:00 p.m., ESPN+		at Lamar	W 85–72	2–2	28 – Wilkerson	7 – Finister	11 – Boykin	Montagne Center (1,848); Beaumont, TX
November 21, 2024*; 6:30 p.m., ESPN+		Trinity (TX)	W 105–78	3–2	26 – Huefner	9 – Ford	5 – Tied	Bernard Johnson Coliseum (785); Huntsville, TX
November 27, 2024*; 3:00 p.m., FloSports		vs. Appalachian State; Live Oak Bank Holiday Classic	L 63–66	3–3	22 – Wilkerson	7 – Finister	5 – Boykin	Trask Coliseum (2,519); Wilmington, NC
November 29, 2024*; 3:00 p.m., FloSports		at UNC Wilmington; Live Oak Bank Holiday Classic	L 60–69	3–4	20 – Wilkerson	7 – Scroggins	2 – Tied	Trask Coliseum (3,374); Wilmington, NC
November 30, 2024*; 11:00 a.m., FloSports		vs. Colgate; Live Oak Bank Holiday Classic	W 82–78	4–4	17 – Wilkerson	8 – Finister	4 – Burns	Trask Coliseum (2,860); Wilmington, NC
December 3, 2024*; 6:30 p.m., BTN		at Indiana	L 71–97	4–5	18 – Wilkerson	6 – Finister	4 – Burns	Simon Skjodt Assembly Hall (17,222); Bloomington, IN
December 7, 2024*; 4:30 p.m., ESPN+		Texas Southern	W 87–71	5–5	26 – Wilkerson	11 – Sakho	6 – Burns	Bernard Johnson Coliseum (454); Huntsville, TX
December 16, 2024*; 6:30 p.m., ESPN+		St. Thomas (TX)	W 80–54	6–5	19 – Wilkerson	17 – Scroggins	4 – Tied	Bernard Johnson Coliseum (356); Huntsville, TX
December 21, 2024*; 12:00 p.m., ACCNX/ESPN+		at Pittsburgh	L 78–110	6–6	26 – Huefner	5 – Huefner	3 – Wilkerson	Petersen Events Center (7,164); Pittsburgh, PA
December 28, 2024*; 2:30 p.m., ESPN+		Dallas (TX)	W 111–65	7–6	20 – Huefner	8 – Huefner	4 – Tied	Bernard Johnson Coliseum (836); Huntsville, TX
Conference USA regular season
January 2, 2025; 5:00 p.m., ESPN+		at New Mexico State	L 71–75	7–7 (0–1)	16 – Sakho	13 – Sakho	6 – Boykin	Pan American Center (3,913); Las Cruces, NM
January 4, 2025; 8:00 p.m., ESPN+		at UTEP	L 72–81	7–8 (0–2)	18 – Boykin	8 – Tied	3 – Wilkerson	Don Haskins Center (5,774); El Paso, TX
January 9, 2025; 8:00 p.m., CBSSN		Liberty	L 68–76	7–9 (0–3)	25 – Wilkerson	9 – Tied	5 – Boykin	Bernard Johnson Coliseum (924); Huntsville, TX
January 11, 2025; 2:30 p.m., ESPN+		FIU	W 81–74	8–9 (1–3)	29 – Wilkerson	8 – Finister	3 – Boykin	Bernard Johnson Coliseum (976); Huntsville, TX
January 16, 2025; 6:00 p.m., ESPN+		at Kennesaw State	L 69–75 ^{OT}	8–10 (1–4)	29 – Wilkerson	12 – Sakho	4 – Burns	Convocation Center (1,788); Kennesaw, GA
January 18, 2025; 4:00 p.m., ESPN+		at Jacksonville State	L 62–70	8–11 (1–5)	20 – Hammons	8 – Sakho	4 – Tied	Pete Mathews Coliseum (3,185); Jacksonville, AL
January 23, 2025; 6:30 p.m., ESPN+		Middle Tennessee	L 75–77	8–12 (1–6)	22 – Boykin	11 – Sakho	8 – Boykin	Bernard Johnson Coliseum (987); Huntsville, TN
January 25, 2025; 2:30 p.m., ESPN+		Western Kentucky	L 66–75	8–13 (1–7)	15 – Huefner	13 – Huefner	6 – Boykin	Bernard Johnson Coliseum (847); Huntsville, TN
February 1, 2025; 3:00 p.m., ESPNU		at Louisiana Tech	L 61–66 ^{OT}	8–14 (1–8)	17 – Wilkerson	9 – Finister	4 – Boykin	Thomas Assembly Center (3,141); Ruston, LA
February 6, 2025; 6:00 p.m., ESPN+		at FIU	L 82–85 ^{OT}	8–15 (1–9)	21 – Wilkerson	9 – Boykin	9 – Boykin	Ocean Bank Convocation Center (1,002); Miami, FL
February 8, 2025; 3:00 p.m., ESPNews		at Liberty	L 61–64	8–16 (1–10)	23 – Boykin	9 – Sakho	5 – Boykin	Liberty Arena (3,355); Lynchburg, VA
February 13, 2025; 6:30 p.m., ESPN+		Jacksonville State	W 66–61	9–16 (2–10)	29 – Wilkerson	6 – Boykin	5 – Boykin	Bernard Johnson Coliseum (866); Huntsville, TX
February 15, 2025; 2:30 p.m., ESPN+		Kennesaw State	W 78–76	10–16 (3–10)	25 – Wilkerson	5 – Tied	2 – Tied	Bernard Johnson Coliseum (1,478); Huntsville, TX
February 20, 2025; 8:00 p.m., ESPNU		at Western Kentucky	W 78–62	11–16 (4–10)	14 – Wilkerson	10 – Wilkerson	7 – Wilkerson	E. A. Diddle Arena (2,945); Bowling Green, KY
February 22, 2025; 2:00 p.m., ESPN+		at Middle Tennessee	L 70–74	11–17 (4–11)	24 – Wilkerson	6 – Sakho	4 – Boykin	Murphy Center (4,413); Murfreesboro, TN
March 1, 2025; 2:30 p.m., ESPN+		Louisiana Tech	L 66–90	11–18 (4–12)	22 – Wilkerson	5 – Tied	3 – Boykin	Bernard Johnson Coliseum (1,438); Huntsville, TX
March 6, 2025; 6:30 p.m., ESPN+		UTEP	W 89–87	12–18 (5–12)	29 – Wilkerson	7 – Boykin	5 – Boykin	Bernard Johnson Coliseum (837); Huntsville, TX
March 8, 2025; 2:30 p.m., ESPN+		New Mexico State	W 76–69	13–18 (6–12)	32 – Wilkerson	6 – Sakho	5 – Wilkerson	Bernard Johnson Coliseum (1,230); Huntsville, TX
Conference USA tournament
March 11, 2025; 5:30 p.m., ESPN+	(9)	vs. (8) UTEP; First round	L 65–79	13–19	22 – Wilkerson	9 – Huefner	3 – Tied	Von Braun Center (989); Huntsville, AL
*Non-conference game. ^{#}Rankings from AP Poll. (#) Tournament seedings in parentheses. All times are in Central.
