= Hiram Williams =

Hiram Williams may refer to:

- Hank Williams (1923–1953), American singer-songwriter
- Hiram D. Williams (1917–2003), American painter
- Hiram Smith Williams (1833-1921), American politician and Confederate soldier
