= Hiram Smith Williams =

Confederate veteran, politician, businessman, and author

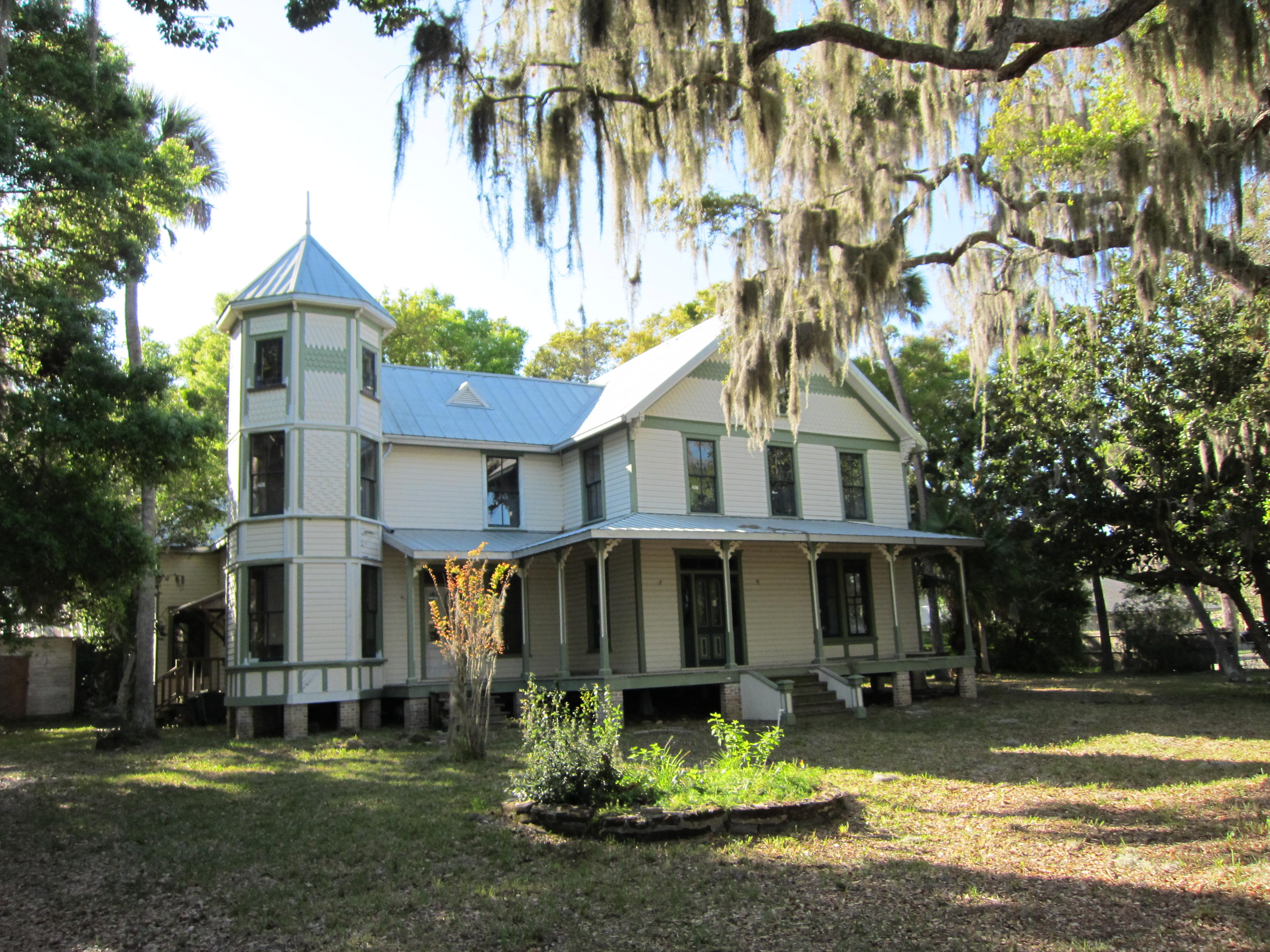
- The H. S. Williams House in 2011
- Born: July 27, 1833; Montclair, New Jersey
- Died: November 18, 1921 (aged 88); Rockledge, Florida
- Relatives: Oliver Cromwell (ancestor)
- Military career
- Allegiance: Confederate States of America
- Branch: Army
- Service years: 1861–1865
- Rank: Private
- Unit: 40th Alabama Volunteer Regiment
- Conflicts: American Civil War; First Battle of Dalton; Battle of New Hope Church; Battle of Atlanta; Battle of Bentonville

Hiram Smith Williams (July 27, 1833 – November 21, 1921) was a Confederate soldier, pioneer senator, postmaster, businessman, and original owner of the H. S. Williams House in Rockledge, Florida.

== Ancestry ==
Hiram Smith Williams was born to John Williams (1798–1866) and Martha Hopping Carter (1805–1901). The Williams traced their roots to Oliver Cromwell, and immigrated to the New World in the 1600s. Hiram's great-grandfather, Nathaniel Williams (1733–1782) was a loyalist whilst his son, Zenas Williams (1762–1829), fought in the Continental Army.

== Early life ==
Williams was born in Montclair, New Jersey (then part of Bloomfield) to a well-respected family in the area. On June 10, 1850, Williams left for Newark to work as an apprentice of David DeCamp, a wagon maker, and traveled to Bridgeport, Connecticut, to work for with Wood and Tomlinson. During this time, Williams became a member of the Know-Nothing Party and during the Presidential election of 1856, traveled across Ohio, Indiana and Illinois. Williams was a supporter of Millard Fillmore and was greatly disappointed at the election of James Buchanan.

== American Civil War ==
Williams was placed in the 40th Alabama Volunteer Regiment in 1862.

Williams's first diary entry, dated to February 16, 1864, in the entry, Williams left Mobile aboard the Senator and arrived in Montgomery in the early morning. He soon became acquainted with Theodore Hamilton and Charles Morton, two theatre directors who invite Williams to be a part of their production of Don César de Bazan. Williams refused and the following day stated that.

"The Company here is miserable, all the talent outside Mr. Hamilton and Mr. Morton could be put in a nutshell. What persons go on the stage for who have not intelligence enough to conceive the characters they attempt to personify is what I could never learn."

On February 20, 1864, Williams arrived in Dalton, Georgia, and reunited with some soldiers whom he met in 1862. He discovered that the company had undergone heavy casualties with graves "scattered from Dog River all through Mississippi, at Columbus, Deer Creek, and Vicksburg." Three days later, Williams fought in the First Battle of Dalton and was nearly killed by a "Yankee shell." whilst in the midst of battle.

Following the battle, the company traveled down a Western and Atlantic Railroad track and Williams notes a grave with the simple engraving: "B. C. Garrison, Co K. 85th Ill. Regiment." Williams fought in the Battles of New Hope Church, Atlanta, and Bentonville. On March 19, 1865, Williams was captured by a Michigan Regiment and became a Prisoner of war.

=== Imprisonment at Point Lookout ===
Williams and his fellow prisoners were sent to Point Lookout Prison in Maryland. While in bondage, Williams recorded the deaths of General Baker on April 10, 1865, and the assassination of Abraham Lincoln on April 15, 1865, of which he wrote on 16th.

"The camp's full of rumors this morning concerning the death of Lincoln. All agree he was shot at the Washington Theatre.—Maj[or] Brady, Pro[vost] Marshal gone to Washington to see about getting a lot of us out of here. (Pvt. Coleman) Going to parole us or commence at least to-morrow."

Williams was held as a POW until June 21, 1865.

== Post-war activities and political career in Florida ==
Following the war's conclusion, Williams returned to Alabama. He lived in Demopolis and owned a successful wagon shop but was driven to Selma in 1872 by carpetbaggers. During this time, he married Margaret Cornelia Coats (1844–1930) and established the Selma Carriage Factory with David Akins. In 1873, Williams heard about the Indian River area of Florida his older brother, Edmund Williams (1831–1894), which caused Hiram to dissolve the company and moved to the area in early 1874/1875. In 1875, he became a well-respected Democratic politician. He became the first postmaster of Rockledge, Florida, Brevard County Treasurer in 1885, state senator, and a member of the Brevard County School Board. In 1880, he had the H.S. Williams House constructed. He became successful in both carriage making and railroad promotion. In 1901, he along with others, established the Brevard County Telephone Company and was the company's director and president. On November 21, 1921, Williams died at his estate.
