= 1989–90 Northeast Louisiana Indians men's basketball team =

American college basketball season

1989–90 Northeast Louisiana Indians men's basketball

Southland Regular season champions Southland tournament champions

NCAA tournament
- Conference: Southland Conference
- Record: 22–8 (13–1 Southland)
- Head coach: Mike Vining (9th season)
- Home arena: Fant–Ewing Coliseum

1989–90 Southland Conference men's basketball standings
	Conf.				Overall
Team	W		L	PCT	W		L	PCT
Northeast Louisiana †	13	–	1	.929	22	–	8	.733
McNeese State	11	–	3	.786	14	–	13	.519
Southwest Texas State	9	–	5	.643	13	–	15	.464
Sam Houston State	8	–	6	.571	10	–	18	.357
Texas–Arlington	6	–	8	.429	13	–	16	.448
Northwestern State	5	–	9	.357	10	–	19	.345
North Texas State	3	–	11	.214	5	–	25	.167
Stephen F. Austin	1	–	13	.071	2	–	25	.074
† 1990 Southland Conference tournament winner

The 1989–90 Northeast Louisiana Indians men's basketball team represented the University of Louisiana at Monroe in the 1989–90 NCAA Division I men's basketball season. The Indiana, led by head coach Mike Vining, played their home games at Fant–Ewing Coliseum in Monroe, Louisiana, as members of the Southland Conference. They finished the season 22–8, 13–1 in Southland play to win the regular season conference title. They followed that success by winning the Southland tournament to earn an automatic bid to the NCAA tournament as No. 15 seed in the Midwest region. Northeast Louisiana fell to No. 2 seed Purdue in the opening round, 75–63.

== Roster ==
1989–90 Northeast Louisiana Indians men's basketball team
Players
Coaches

Pos.	#	Name	Height	Weight	Year	Hometown
F		Carlos Funchess	6 ft 3 in (1.91 m)	—	Jr
F		Anthony Jones	6 ft 3 in (1.91 m)	—	Jr

Head coach

- Mike Vining

Assistant coach(es)

Legend

- (C) Team captain
- (S) Suspended
- (I) Ineligible
- (W) Walk-on
- Injured
- Current redshirt

== Schedule and results ==
Date time, TV	Rank^{#}	Opponent^{#}	Result	Record	Site (attendance) city, state
Regular season
Nov 24, 1989*		vs. Mississippi State	L 68–75	0–1	
Nov 25, 1989*		vs. Baylor	L 68–69	0–2	
Nov 27, 1989*		Jackson State	W 90–72	1–2	Fant-Ewing Coliseum; Monroe, Louisiana
Southland tournament
Mar 6, 1990*		Texas-Arlington; Southland tournament Semifinal	W 65–50	21–7	Fant-Ewing Coliseum; Monroe, Louisiana
Mar 7, 1990*		North Texas; Southland tournament championship	W 84–68	22–7	Fant-Ewing Coliseum; Monroe, Louisiana
NCAA tournament
Mar 16, 1990*	(15 MW)	vs. (2 MW) No. 10 Purdue; First Round	L 63–75	22–8	RCA Dome; Indianapolis, Indiana
*Non-conference game. ^{#}Rankings from AP Poll. (#) Tournament seedings in parentheses. MW=Midwest. All times are in Central.
