= 2024–25 Jacksonville State Gamecocks men's basketball team =

American college basketball season

2024–25 Jacksonville State Gamecocks men's basketball

NIT, Second Round
- Conference: Conference USA
- Record: 23–13 (12–6 CUSA)
- Head coach: Ray Harper (9th season)
- Associate head coach: Dennan Morrow
- Assistant coaches: Tommy Wade; Kevin Jones
- Home arena: Pete Mathews Coliseum

2024–25 Conference USA men's basketball standings
| | Conf. | | | | Overall |
| Team | W | | L | PCT | W | | L | PCT |
|---|---|---|---|---|---|---|---|---|
| Liberty † | 13 | – | 5 | .722 | 28 | – | 7 | .800 |
| Jacksonville State | 12 | – | 6 | .667 | 23 | – | 13 | .639 |
| Middle Tennessee | 12 | – | 6 | .667 | 22 | – | 12 | .647 |
| Kennesaw State | 10 | – | 8 | .556 | 19 | – | 14 | .576 |
| New Mexico State | 10 | – | 8 | .556 | 17 | – | 15 | .531 |
| Louisiana Tech | 9 | – | 9 | .500 | 20 | – | 12 | .625 |
| Western Kentucky | 8 | – | 10 | .444 | 17 | – | 15 | .531 |
| UTEP | 7 | – | 11 | .389 | 18 | – | 15 | .545 |
| Sam Houston | 6 | – | 12 | .333 | 13 | – | 19 | .406 |
| FIU | 3 | – | 15 | .167 | 10 | – | 23 | .303 |
† 2025 CUSA tournament winner

The 2024–25 Jacksonville State Gamecocks men's basketball team represented Jacksonville State University in the 2024–25 NCAA Division I men's basketball season. The Gamecocks, led by ninth-year head coach Ray Harper, played their home games at the Pete Mathews Coliseum in Jacksonville, Alabama as second-year members of the Conference USA.

== Previous season ==
The Gamecocks finished the 2023–24 season 14–18, 6–10 in C-USA play to finish in eighth place. They lost in the first round to FIU in the C-USA tournament.

== Offseason ==
=== Departures ===
| Name | Number | Pos. | Height | Weight | Year | Hometown | Reason for departure |
|---|---|---|---|---|---|---|---|
| Quincy Clark | 1 | G | 6'2" | 180 | Junior | Westerville, OH | Transferred to UMass Lowell |
| Juwan Perdue | 2 | F | 6'6" | 200 | Senior | Sumter, SC | Graduated |
| Travis Roberts | 3 | G | 6'6" | 205 | Sophomore | Waldorf, MD | Transferred to Marist |
| Ivan Reynolds | 5 | G | 6'4" | 200 | Junior | Pompano Beach, FL | Transferred |
| Brad Lewis | 10 | G | 6'4" | 175 | (redshirt) Sophomore | Alabaster, AL | Walk-on; left the team due to personal reasons |
| Alex Odam | 11 | G | 6'3" | 175 | Freshman | Piedmont, AL | Left the team due to personal reasons |
| Matt Mayers | 13 | F | 6'8" | 210 | GS Senior | Hastings-on-Hudson, NY | Graduated |
| Andres Burney | 23 | F | 6'9" | 210 | Junior | Brundidge, AL | TBD |
| KyKy Tandy | 24 | G | 6'2" | 190 | GS Senior | Hopkinsville, KY | Graduate transferred to Florida Atlantic |
| Thomas Curlee | 55 | G | 6'3" | 165 | Freshman | Anniston, AL | Walk-on; left the team due to personal reasons |

=== Incoming transfers ===
| Name | Num | Pos. | Height | Weight | Year | Hometown | Previous school |
|---|---|---|---|---|---|---|---|
| Marcus Fitzgerald Jr. | 1 | G | 6'2" | 182 | Senior | Nashville, TN | Tennessee State |
| Koree Cotton | 3 | G | 6'6" | 185 | (redshirt) Freshman | Florida City, FL | VMI |
| Jaron Pierre Jr. | 5 | G | 6'5" | 188 | (redshirt) Senior | New Orleans, LA | Wichita State |
| Michael Houge | 6 | G | 6'7" | 225 | Senior | Detroit, MI | Saint Peter's |
| Benjamin Bayela | 7 | G | 6'6" | 200 | GS Senior | Le Chesnay-Rocquencourt, France | East Carolina |
| Jao Ituka | 10 | G | 6'1" | 196 | (redshirt) Junior | Gaithersburg, MD | Wake Forest |
| Jamar Franklin | 11 | G | 6'3" | 170 | Junior | Rockledge, FL | Georgia Southern |
| Aidan Driggers | 55 | F | 6'6" | 216 | Junior | Oneonta, AL | Walk-on; Marion Military Institute |
| Iaroslav Niagu | 99 | F | 7'0" | 235 | Sophomore | Krasnodar, Russia | Charlotte |

=== 2024 recruiting class ===
College recruiting information
| Name | Hometown | School | Height | Weight | Commit date |
|---|---|---|---|---|---|
| Quel'Ron House; PG | Louisville, KY | Seneca High School | 6 ft 0 in (1.83 m) | 165 lb (75 kg) | May 20, 2024 |
| Quel'Ron House; PG | Recruit ratings: No ratings found | | | | |
Overall recruit ranking:
Note: In many cases, Scout, Rivals, 247Sports, On3, and ESPN may conflict in their listings of height and weight.; In these cases, the average was taken. ESPN grades are on a 100-point scale.; Sources: "2024 Jacksonville State Basketball Commits". ESPN.

== Roster ==
2024–25 Jacksonville State Gamecocks men's basketball team
Players
Coaches

| Pos. | # | Name | Height | Weight | Year | Previous school | Hometown |
|---|---|---|---|---|---|---|---|
| F | 0 | Caleb Johnson | 6 ft 7 in (2.01 m) | 200 lb (91 kg) | Sr | Father Henry Carr; Vincennes | North Preston, NS |
| G | 1 | Marcus Fitzgerald Jr. | 6 ft 2 in (1.88 m) | 182 lb (83 kg) | Sr | Pearl-Cohn HS; Tennessee State | Nashville, TN |
| G | 2 | Quel'Ron House | 5 ft 11 in (1.8 m) | 175 lb (79 kg) | Fr | Seneca HS | Louisville, KY |
| G | 3 | Koree Cotton | 6 ft 6 in (1.98 m) | 185 lb (84 kg) | RS Fr | Miami Southridge HS; VMI | Florida City, FL |
| F | 4 | Marcellus Brigham Jr. | 6 ft 7 in (2.01 m) | 210 lb (95 kg) | Sr | Briarcrest Christian HS | Memphis, TN |
| G | 5 | Jaron Pierre Jr. | 6 ft 5 in (1.96 m) | 188 lb (85 kg) | RS Sr | St. Augustine HS; Wichita State | New Orleans, LA |
| G | 6 | Michael Houge | 6 ft 7 in (2.01 m) | 225 lb (102 kg) | Sr | Chattanooga Christian; Saint Peter's | Detroit, MI |
| G | 7 | Ben Bayela | 6 ft 6 in (1.98 m) | 195 lb (88 kg) | GS | Metropolitans 92; East Carolina | Le Chesnay-Rocquencourt, France |
| G | 10 | Jao Ituka | 6 ft 1 in (1.85 m) | 196 lb (89 kg) | RS Jr | Gaithersburg HS; Wake Forest | Gaithersburg, MD |
| G | 11 | Jamar Franklin | 6 ft 3 in (1.91 m) | 170 lb (77 kg) | Jr | Rockledge HS; Georgia Southern | Rockledge, FL |
| F | 20 | Gora Niang | 6 ft 7 in (2.01 m) | 190 lb (86 kg) | So | Central Pointe Christian Academy (FL) | Richard Toll, Senegal |
| G | 22 | Tyre Patterson (W) | 6 ft 2 in (1.88 m) | 185 lb (84 kg) | So | Athens HS | Athens, AL |
| C | 50 | Mason Nicholson | 6 ft 10 in (2.08 m) | 280 lb (127 kg) | Jr | Gary West Side HS; Northwest Florida State College | Gary, IN |
| F | 55 | Aidan Driggers (W) | 6 ft 6 in (1.98 m) | 215 lb (98 kg) | Jr | Appalachian HS (AL); Marion Military Institute | Oneonta, AL |
| F | 99 | Iaroslav Niagu | 7 ft 0 in (2.13 m) | 235 lb (107 kg) | Jr | Krasnodar Territory Boarding School; Charlotte | Krasnodar, Russia |

Head coach

- Ray Harper (Kentucky Wesleyan)

Assistant coach(es)

- Dennan Morrow (Kansas State)
- Tommy Wade (Southeast Missouri State)
- Kevin Jones (Bowie State)

Legend

- (C) Team captain
- (S) Suspended
- (I) Ineligible
- (W) Walk-on
- Injured
- Current redshirt

Roster

== Schedule and results ==
| Date time, TV | Rank^{#} | Opponent^{#} | Result | Record | High points | High rebounds | High assists | Site (attendance) city, state |
Non-conference regular season
| November 4, 2024*; 11:30 a.m., ESPN+ | | LaGrange | W 112−48 | 1−0 | 24 – Pierre Jr. | 12 – 2 tied | 5 – Niagu | Pete Mathews Coliseum (2,055); Jacksonville, AL |
| November 7, 2024*; 8:00 p.m., MW Network | | at Air Force | L 67−73 | 1−1 | 21 – Pierre Jr. | 11 – Houge | 4 – Pierre Jr. | Clune Arena (453); Colorado Springs, CO |
| November 13, 2024*; 6:00 p.m., ESPN+ | | Georgia State | W 72−67 | 2−1 | 27 – Pierre Jr. | 14 – Nicholson | 5 – Pierre Jr. | Pete Mathews Coliseum (2,654); Jacksonville, AL |
| November 17, 2024*; 1:00 p.m., ESPN+ | | at Coastal Carolina | W 71–53 | 3–1 | 31 – Pierre Jr. | 8 – Tied | 3 – Pierre Jr. | HTC Center (1,604); Conway, SC |
| November 21, 2024*; 4:00 p.m., BallerTV | | vs. East Carolina; Boardwalk Battle quarterfinals | W 86–78 | 4–1 | 18 – Ituka | 6 – Tied | 6 – Pierre Jr. | Ocean Center; Daytona Beach, FL |
| November 22, 2024*; 4:30 p.m., BallerTV | | vs. Toledo; Boardwalk Battle semifinals | L 80–82 | 4–2 | 20 – Pierre Jr. | 9 – Pierre Jr. | 3 – Cotton | Ocean Center (920); Daytona Beach, FL |
| November 23, 2024*; 2:30 p.m., BallerTV | | vs. James Madison; Boardwalk Battle 3rd place game | L 65–71 | 4–3 | 24 – Pierre Jr. | 8 – Nicholson | 7 – Pierre Jr. | Ocean Center; Daytona Beach, FL |
| December 2, 2024*; 6:00 p.m., ESPN+ | | Columbia International | W 89–59 | 5–3 | 30 – Pierre Jr. | 10 – Pierre Jr. | 6 – Cotton | Pete Mathews Coliseum (1,433); Jacksonville, AL |
| December 8, 2024*; 3:00 p.m., ESPN+ | | at South Alabama | L 74–76 | 5–4 | 13 – Pierre Jr. | 9 – Nicholson | 6 – Pierre Jr. | Mitchell Center (1,754); Mobile, AL |
| December 14, 2024*; 4:00 p.m., ESPN+ | | Utah Valley; C-USA/WAC Alliance | W 70–66 | 6–4 | 26 – Pierre Jr. | 8 – Tied | 4 – Pierre Jr. | Pete Mathews Coliseum (1,033); Jacksonville, AL |
| December 17, 2024*; 6:30 p.m., SECN+ | | at Missouri | L 72–83 | 6–5 | 18 – Pierre Jr. | 9 – Tied | 3 – Cotton | Mizzou Arena (8,515); Columbia, MO |
| December 21, 2024*; 2:00 p.m., ESPN+ | | at Eastern Kentucky | W 91–80 | 7–5 | 22 – Pierre Jr. | 11 – Nicholson | 4 – Tied | Seabury Center (495); Berea, KY |
| December 30, 2024*; 7:00 p.m., ESPN+ | | Fort Valley State | W 111–70 | 8–5 | 29 – Pierre Jr. | 13 – Houge | 10 – Pierre Jr. | Pete Mathews Coliseum (1,332); Jacksonville, AL |
Conference USA regular season
| January 4, 2025; 4:00 p.m., ESPN+ | | at Kennesaw State | L 71–83 | 8–6 (0–1) | 20 – Pierre Jr. | 6 – Brigham Jr. | 4 – Pierre Jr. | Convocation Center (2,007); Kennesaw, GA |
| January 9, 2025; 4:00 p.m., ESPN+ | | at Western Kentucky | W 73–67 | 9–6 (1–1) | 20 – Nicholson | 12 – Nicholson | 7 – House | E. A. Diddle Arena (2,823); Bowling Green, KY |
| January 11, 2025; 5:00 p.m., ESPN+ | | at Middle Tennessee | L 64–81 | 9–7 (1–2) | 22 – Pierre Jr. | 10 – Houge | 5 – House | Murphy Center (2,237); Murfreesboro, TN |
| January 16, 2025; 6:00 p.m., ESPN+ | | Louisiana Tech | W 63–61 | 10–7 (2–2) | 14 – Pierre Jr. | 8 – Nicholson | 7 – Pierre Jr. | Pete Mathews Coliseum (2,317); Jacksonville, AL |
| January 18, 2025; 4:00 p.m., ESPN+ | | Sam Houston | W 70–62 | 11–7 (3–2) | 20 – Pierre Jr. | 11 – Houge | 3 – Brigham Jr. | Pete Mathews Coliseum (3,185); Jacksonville, AL |
| January 23, 2025; 8:00 p.m., ESPN+ | | at UTEP | W 73–66 | 12–7 (4–2) | 20 – Houge | 9 – Nicholson | 6 – Pierre Jr. | Don Haskins Center (4,372); El Paso, TX |
| January 25, 2025; 8:00 p.m., ESPN+ | | at New Mexico State | W 65–59 | 13–7 (5–2) | 20 – Pierre Jr. | 11 – Nicholson | 5 – House | Pan American Center (4,919); Las Cruces, NM |
| January 30, 2025; 6:00 p.m., ESPN+ | | FIU | W 71–67 | 14–7 (6–2) | 14 – Pierre Jr. | 7 – Nicholson | 4 – Pierre Jr. | Pete Mathews Coliseum (2,877); Jacksonville, AL |
| February 1, 2025; 4:00 p.m., ESPN+ | | Liberty | W 72–61 | 15–7 (7–2) | 18 – House | 10 – Nicholson | 4 – House | Pete Mathews Coliseum (2,967); Jacksonville, AL |
| February 6, 2025; 6:00 p.m., ESPN+ | | Middle Tennessee | W 77–63 | 16–7 (8–2) | 36 – Pierre Jr. | 9 – Houge | 5 – House | Pete Mathews Coliseum (2,943); Jacksonville, AL |
| February 8, 2025; 4:00 p.m., ESPN+ | | Western Kentucky | W 85–83 | 17–7 (9–2) | 28 – Pierre Jr. | 9 – Houge | 4 – Tied | Pete Mathews Coliseum (2,169); Jacksonville, AL |
| February 13, 2025; 6:30 p.m., ESPN+ | | at Sam Houston | L 61–66 | 17–8 (9–3) | 21 – Pierre Jr. | 10 – Nicholson | 1 – Tied | Bernard Johnson Coliseum (866); Huntsville, TX |
| February 15, 2025; 3:00 p.m., ESPN+ | | at Louisiana Tech | W 70–68 | 18–8 (10–3) | 34 – Pierre Jr. | 6 – Pierre Jr. | 2 – Pierre Jr. | Thomas Assembly Center (3,140); Ruston, LA |
| February 20, 2025; 6:00 p.m., ESPN+ | | New Mexico State | L 52–61 | 18–9 (10–4) | 30 – Pierre Jr. | 10 – Nicholson | 3 – Pierre Jr. | Pete Mathews Coliseum (2,322); Jacksonville, AL |
| February 22, 2025; 4:00 p.m., ESPN+ | | UTEP | W 73–65 | 19–9 (11–4) | 23 – Pierre Jr. | 11 – Houge | 6 – House | Pete Mathews Coliseum (2,334); Jacksonville, AL |
| February 27, 2025; 6:00 p.m., ESPN+ | | at Liberty | L 55–59 | 19–10 (11–5) | 14 – Ituka | 10 – Nicholson | 4 – Cotton | Liberty Arena (3,716); Lynchburg, VA |
| March 1, 2025; 1:00 p.m., ESPN+ | | at FIU | W 84–79 ^{2OT} | 20–10 (12–5) | 29 – Ituka | 7 – Niagu | 4 – Tied | Ocean Bank Convocation Center (612); Miami, FL |
| March 8, 2025; 2:00 p.m., ESPN+ | | Kennesaw State | L 70–74 | 20–11 (12–6) | 22 – Pierre Jr. | 8 – Houge | 3 – House | Pete Mathews Coliseum (2,977); Jacksonville, AL |
Conference USA Tournament
| March 12, 2025; 8:00 p.m., ESPN+ | (2) | vs. (10) FIU; Quarterfinals | W 65–56 | 21–11 | 19 – Pierre Jr. | 11 – Pierre Jr. | 4 – House | Von Braun Center (2,562); Huntsville, AL |
| March 14, 2025; 2:00 p.m., CBSSN | (2) | vs. (3) Middle Tennessee; Semifinals | W 70–68 | 22–11 | 20 – House | 9 – Brigham Jr. | 3 – Tied | Von Braun Center (2,506); Huntsville, AL |
| March 15, 2025; 7:30 p.m., CBSSN | (2) | vs. (1) Liberty; Championship | L 67–79 | 22–12 | 19 – Pierre Jr. | 5 – Tied | 4 – Pierre Jr. | Von Braun Center (2,146); Huntsville, AL |
NIT
| March 18, 2025*; 6:00 p.m., ESPN2 | | at (4) Georgia Tech; First round – Irvine Region | W 81–64 | 23–12 | 30 – Pierre Jr. | 9 – Nicholson | 7 – Pierre Jr. | McCamish Pavilion (1,623); Atlanta, GA |
| March 23, 2025*; 8:00 p.m., ESPN+ | | at (1) UC Irvine; Second round – Irvine Region | L 61–66 | 23–13 | 15 – Pierre Jr. | 11 – Pierre Jr. | 4 – Pierre Jr. | Bren Events Center (1,304); Irvine, CA |
*Non-conference game. ^{#}Rankings from AP Poll. (#) Tournament seedings in parentheses. All times are in Central.
