= 1996 Southland Conference men's basketball tournament =

Basketball Tournament March 1997 in Louisiana

- Classification: Division I
- Season: 1995–96
- Teams: 6
- Site: Hirsch Memorial Coliseum; Shreveport, Louisiana
- Champions: Northeast Louisiana (6th title)
- Winning coach: Mike Vining (6th title)
- MVP: Paul Marshall (Louisiana-Monroe)

1995–96 Southland Conference men's basketball standings
	Conf.				Overall
Team	W		L	PCT	W		L	PCT
Northeast Louisiana †	13	–	5	.722	16	–	14	.533
North Texas	12	–	6	.667	15	–	13	.536
UTSA	12	–	6	.667	14	–	14	.500
Stephen F. Austin	11	–	7	.611	17	–	11	.607
McNeese State	11	–	7	.611	15	–	12	.556
Sam Houston State	9	–	9	.500	11	–	16	.407
Southwest Texas State	7	–	11	.389	11	–	15	.423
Texas–Arlington	7	–	11	.389	11	–	15	.423
Nicholls State	5	–	13	.278	5	–	21	.192
Northwestern State	3	–	15	.167	5	–	21	.192
† 1996 Southland tournament winner Rankings from AP Poll

The 1996 Southland Conference men's basketball tournament was held March 7–9 at Hirsch Memorial Coliseum in Shreveport, Louisiana.

Northeast Louisiana defeated North Texas in the championship game, 71–60, to win their fifth Southland men's basketball tournament.

The Indians received a bid to the 1996 NCAA Tournament as the No. 15 seed in the Midwest region.

== Format ==
Six of the ten conference members participated in the tournament field. They were seeded based on regular season conference records, with the top two seeds receiving a bye to the semifinal round. Tournament play began with the quarterfinal round.

== Bracket ==
Quarterfinals; March 7
4	McNeese State	91
5	Stephen F. Austin	94
3	Texas-San Antonio	60
6	Sam Houston State	58

Semifinals; March 8
1	Northeast Louisiana	92
5	Stephen F. Austin	73
3	Texas-San Antonio	71
2	North Texas	80

Championship; March 9
1	Northeast Louisiana	71
2	North Texas	60
