= Barton Avenue Residential District =

Historic district in Florida, United States

- U.S. National Register of Historic Places
- U.S. Historic district
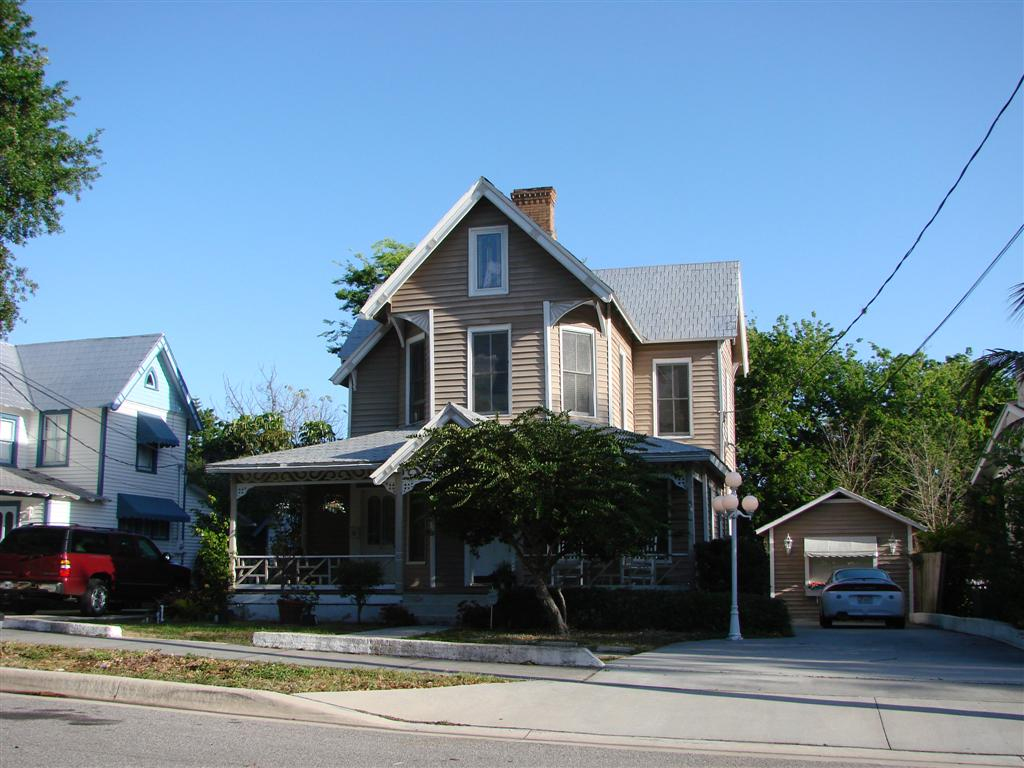
- A house in the district

- Location within Florida Location within the United States
- Location: Rockledge, Florida
- Coordinates: 28°20′1.48″N 80°43′7.46″W
- Area: 50 acres (200,000 m^{2})
- MPS: Rockledge MPS
- NRHP reference No.: 92001046
- Added to NRHP: August 21, 1992

The Barton Avenue Residential District is a U.S. historic district (designated as such on August 21, 1992) located in Rockledge, Florida. The district runs from 11 through 59 Barton Avenue. It contains 41 historic buildings.
