= Mike Vining (coach) =

American basketball coach

Biographical details
- Born: October 26, 1944 (age 82)

Playing career
- 1963–1966: Northeast Louisiana State

Coaching career (HC unless noted)
- 1967–1969: Northeast Louisiana State (asst.)
- 1971–1978: Bastrop HS (LA)
- 1978–1981: Northeast Louisiana (asst.)
- 1981–2005: Northeast Louisiana / Louisiana–Monroe

Head coaching record
- Overall: 401–303 (.570) (college)
- Tournaments: 0–7 (NCAA Division I); 0–1 (NIT)

Accomplishments and honors

Championships
- TAAC tournament (1982); 6 Southland tournament (1986, 1990–1993, 1996); 7 Southland regular season (1986, 1990, 1991, 1993, 1994, 1996, 1997)

Awards
- 4x Southland Coach of the Year (1986, 1990, 1993, 1996)

Mike Vining (born October 26, 1944) is an American retired college basketball coach. He was head men's basketball coach at the University of Louisiana at Monroe from 1981 to 2005. During his time at Louisiana–Monroe, he led the team to seven NCAA Division I men's basketball tournament appearances.

== Head coaching record ==
=== College ===
Record table
Season	Team	Overall	Conference	Standing	Postseason
Northeast Louisiana Indians (Trans America Athletic Conference) (1981–1982)
1981–82	Northeast Louisiana	19–11	9–7	T–3rd	NCAA Division I First Round
Northeast Louisiana / Louisiana–Monroe Indians (Southland Conference) (1982–2005)
1982–83	Northeast Louisiana	14–14	6–6	T–3rd	
1983–84	Northeast Louisiana	17–12	9–3	2nd	
1984–85	Northeast Louisiana	17–12	4–8	5th	
1985–86	Northeast Louisiana	20–10	9–3	1st	NCAA Division I First Round
1986–87	Northeast Louisiana	13–15	3–7	6th	
1987–88	Northeast Louisiana	21–9	10–4	2nd	NIT First Round
1988–89	Northeast Louisiana	17–12	9–5	T–2nd	
1989–90	Northeast Louisiana	22–8	13–1	1st	NCAA Division I First Round
1990–91	Northeast Louisiana	25–8	13–1	1st	NCAA Division I First Round
1991–92	Northeast Louisiana	19–10	12–6	T–2nd	NCAA Division I First Round
1992–93	Northeast Louisiana	26–5	17–1	1st	NCAA Division I First Round
1993–94	Northeast Louisiana	19–9	15–3	1st	
1994–95	Northeast Louisiana	14–18	11–7	T–2nd	
1995–96	Northeast Louisiana	16–14	13–5	1st	NCAA Division I First Round
1996–97	Northeast Louisiana	14–14	10–6	T–1st	
1997–98	Northeast Louisiana	13–16	8–8	T–5th	
1998–99	Northeast Louisiana	13–14	12–6	T–2nd	
1999–00	Louisiana–Monroe	19–9	13–5	2nd	
2000–01	Louisiana–Monroe	11–17	8–12	8th	
2001–02	Louisiana–Monroe	20–12	15–5	2nd	
2002–03	Louisiana–Monroe	12–16	10–10	T–5th	
2003–04	Louisiana–Monroe	12–19	8–8	T–5th	
2004–05	Louisiana–Monroe	8–19	2–14	10th	
Northeast Louisiana / Louisiana–Monroe:		401–303 (.570)	239–141 (.629)		
Total:		401–303 (.570)			
National champion Postseason invitational champion Conference regular season champion Conference regular season and conference tournament champion Division regular season champion Division regular season and conference tournament champion Conference tournament champion
