= 1982 TAAC men's basketball tournament =

- Classification: Division I
- Season: 1981–82
- Teams: 7
- Site: Fant–Ewing Coliseum; Monroe, LA
- Champions: Northeast Louisiana (2nd title)
- Winning coach: Mike Vining (2nd title)
- MVP: Donald Wilson (Northeast Louisiana)
- TAAC men's basketball tournaments

1981–82 Trans America Athletic Conference men's basketball standings
	Conf.				Overall
Team	W		L	PCT	W		L	PCT
Arkansas–Little Rock	12	–	4	.750	19	–	8	.704
Northwestern State	10	–	6	.625	19	–	9	.679
Northeast Louisiana †	9	–	7	.563	19	–	11	.633
Centenary	9	–	7	.563	17	–	12	.586
Mercer	8	–	8	.500	16	–	11	.593
Georgia Southern	8	–	8	.500	14	–	13	.519
Houston Baptist	8	–	8	.500	13	–	14	.481
Samford	6	–	10	.375	11	–	15	.423
Hardin–Simmons	2	–	14	.125	6	–	20	.231
† 1982 TAAC tournament winner Rankings from AP Poll

The 1982 Trans America Athletic Conference men's basketball tournament (now known as the ASUN men's basketball tournament) was held March 3–5 at the Fant–Ewing Coliseum in Monroe, Louisiana.

Northeast Louisiana defeated Centenary in the championship game, 98–85, to win their second TAAC/Atlantic Sun men's basketball tournament. The Indians, in turn, received an automatic bid to the 1982 NCAA tournament.

Only the top seven teams in the conference qualified for this year's tournament; the two teams with the worst records, Samford and Hardin–Simmons, were excluded.

== Bracket ==
Quarterfinals; Wednesday, March 3
5	Georgia Southern	69
4	Centenary	70
3	Northeast Louisiana	54
6	Houston Baptist	46
7	Mercer	74
2	Northwestern State	85

Semifinals; Thursday, March 4
1	Arkansas–Little Rock	100
4	Centenary	106
3	Northeast Louisiana	81
2	Northwestern State	64

Championship; Friday, March 5
4	Centenary	85
3	Northeast Louisiana	98
