= 1981–82 Northeast Louisiana Indians men's basketball team =

American college basketball season

1981–82 Northeast Louisiana Indians men's basketball

TAAC tournament champions

NCAA tournament
- Conference: Trans America Athletic Conference
- Record: 19–11 (9–7 TAAC)
- Head coach: Mike Vining (1st season)
- Home arena: Fant–Ewing Coliseum

1981–82 Trans America Athletic Conference men's basketball standings
	Conf.				Overall
Team	W		L	PCT	W		L	PCT
Arkansas–Little Rock	12	–	4	.750	19	–	8	.704
Northwestern State	10	–	6	.625	19	–	9	.679
Northeast Louisiana †	9	–	7	.563	19	–	11	.633
Centenary	9	–	7	.563	17	–	12	.586
Mercer	8	–	8	.500	16	–	11	.593
Georgia Southern	8	–	8	.500	14	–	13	.519
Houston Baptist	8	–	8	.500	13	–	14	.481
Samford	6	–	10	.375	11	–	15	.423
Hardin–Simmons	2	–	14	.125	6	–	20	.231
† 1982 TAAC tournament winner Rankings from AP Poll

The 1981–82 Northeast Louisiana Indians men's basketball team represented the University of Louisiana at Monroe during the 1981–82 NCAA Division I men's basketball season. The Indians, led by first-year head coach Mike Vining, played their home games at Fant–Ewing Coliseum in Monroe, Louisiana, as members of the Trans America Athletic Conference. They finished the season 19–11, 9–7 in TAAC play to finish third in the regular season standings. They followed that success by winning the TAAC tournament to earn an automatic bid to the NCAA tournament as No. 11 seed in the West region. Northeast Louisiana fell to No. 6 seed Iowa in the opening round, 70–63.

== Roster ==
1981–82 Northeast Louisiana Indians men's basketball team
Players	Coaches
Pos. / # / Name / Height / Weight / Year / Hometown; F / / Donald Wilson / 6 ft 6 in (1.98 m) / — / Sr	Head coach: Mike Vining; Assistant coach(es) Legend: (C) Team captain; (S) Suspended; (I) Ineligible; (W) Walk-on; Injured; Current redshirt

== Schedule and results ==
Date time, TV	Rank^{#}	Opponent^{#}	Result	Record	Site (attendance) city, state
Regular season
Jan 17, 1982*		at Louisiana Tech	W 76–66	8–5	Memorial Gym; Ruston, Louisiana
Feb 27, 1982		Georgia Southern	W 85–73	16–10 (9–7)	Fant-Ewing Coliseum; Monroe, Louisiana
TAAC tournament
Mar 3, 1982*		Houston Christian; Quarterfinals	W 54–46	17–10	Fant-Ewing Coliseum; Monroe, Louisiana
Mar 4, 1982*		Northwestern State; Semifinals	W 81–64	18–10	Fant-Ewing Coliseum; Monroe, Louisiana
Mar 5, 1982*		Centenary; Championship game	W 98–85	19–10	Fant-Ewing Coliseum; Monroe, Louisiana
NCAA Tournament
Mar 12, 1982*	(11 W)	vs. (6 W) No. 16 Iowa; First round	L 63–70	19–11	Beasley Coliseum (9,420); Pullman, Washington
*Non-conference game. ^{#}Rankings from AP Poll. (#) Tournament seedings in parentheses. W=West. All times are in Central.
