= Rockledge Drive Residential District =

Historic district in Florida, United States

- U.S. National Register of Historic Places
- U.S. Historic district
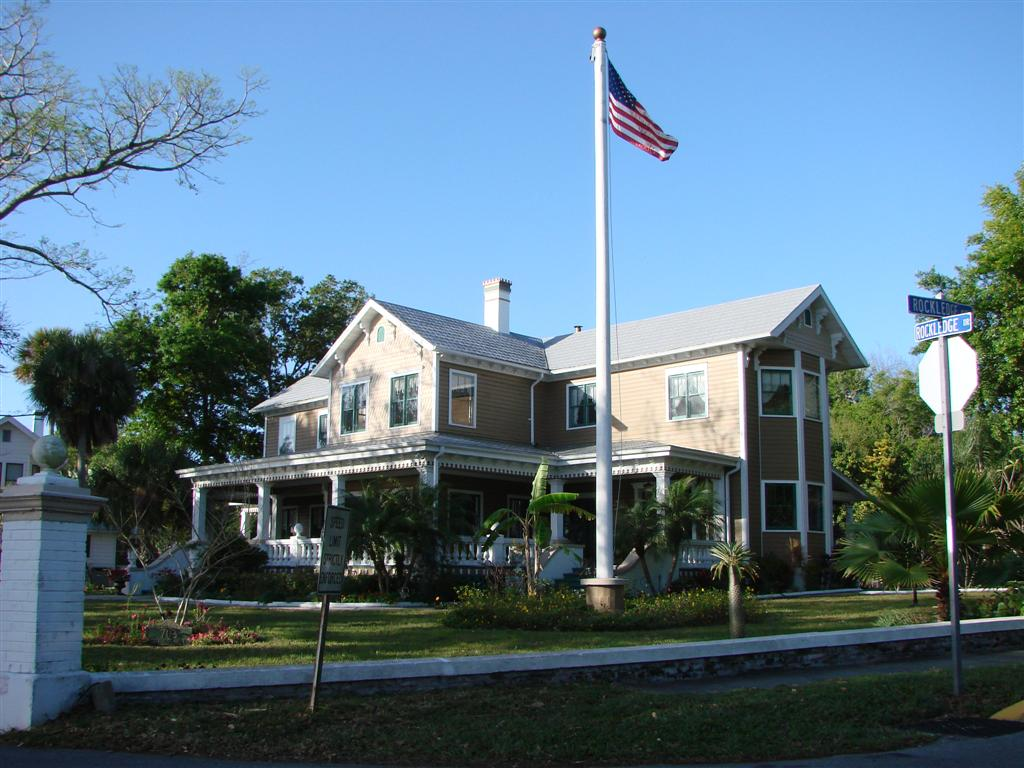
- A house in the district

- Location within Florida Location within the United States
- Location: Rockledge, Florida
- Coordinates: 28°19′50″N 80°42′55.8″W
- Area: 520 acres (210 ha)
- MPS: Rockledge MPS
- NRHP reference No.: 92001045
- Added to NRHP: August 21, 1992

The Rockledge Drive Residential District is a U.S. historic district (designated as such on August 21, 1992) located in Rockledge, Florida. The district runs from 15 through 23 Rockledge Avenue, 219 through 1361 Rockledge Drive and 1 through 11 Orange Avenue. It contains 100 historic buildings, including the H. S. Williams House, also known as Lawndale.
