= 1990 Southland Conference men's basketball tournament =

- Classification: Division I
- Season: 1989–90
- Teams: 7
- Site: Fant-Ewing Coliseum; Monroe, Louisiana
- Champions: Northeast Louisiana (2nd title)
- Winning coach: Mike Vining (2nd title)
- MVP: Anthony Jones (Northeast Louisiana)

1989–90 Southland Conference men's basketball standings
	Conf.				Overall
Team	W		L	PCT	W		L	PCT
Northeast Louisiana †	13	–	1	.929	22	–	8	.733
McNeese State	11	–	3	.786	14	–	13	.519
Southwest Texas State	9	–	5	.643	13	–	15	.464
Sam Houston State	8	–	6	.571	10	–	18	.357
Texas–Arlington	6	–	8	.429	13	–	16	.448
Northwestern State	5	–	9	.357	10	–	19	.345
North Texas State	3	–	11	.214	5	–	25	.167
Stephen F. Austin	1	–	13	.071	2	–	25	.074
† 1990 Southland Conference tournament winner

The 1990 Southland Conference men's basketball tournament was held March 5–7 at Fant-Ewing Coliseum in Monroe, Louisiana.

Northeast Louisiana defeated North Texas in the championship game, 84–68, to win their first Southland men's basketball tournament.

The Warhawks received a bid to the 1990 NCAA Tournament as the #15 seed in the Midwest region.

== Format ==
All seven of the conference's members participated in the tournament field. They were seeded based on regular season conference records, with the top team earning a bye into the semifinal round. The other six teams began play in the quarterfinal round.

Games in the quarterfinal round were played at the home court of the higher-seeded team. All remaining games were played at Fant-Ewing Coliseum in Monroe, Louisiana.

== Bracket ==
Quarterfinals; Tuesday, March 5
4	Sam Houston State	66
5	Texas–Arlington	72
3	Southwest Texas State	58
6	Northwestern State	82
2	McNeese State	62
7	North Texas State	67

Semifinals; Wednesday, March 6
1	NE Louisiana	65
5	Texas-Arlington	50
6	Northwestern State	61
7	North Texas State	63

Championship; Thursday, March 7
1	NE Louisiana	84
7	North Texas State	68
