= Sawgrass Academy Middle =

Defunct charter school in Florida, United States

Coordinates: 28.3033°N 80.7395°W

Sawgrass Academy was a small charter school in Rockledge, Florida. The school served around 300 students. It shared two campuses, one for the 6th through 8th grade class located at Sawgrass, and the K through 5th grade located at the sister school, Osprey Elementary, at the same location.

The school was originally located next to the Space Coast Ice Plex in Rockledge and shared the same lot. For the 2007-2008 school year, the school was relocated to the former location of Explorer Charter School in Melbourne, Florida, which had lost its charter.

The school was closed shortly after the beginning of the 2007-2008 school year after losing its charter from Brevard County. School property such as computers and desks were to be sold to help pay back investors and the county.

== Sources ==
- Charter chief says she got the boot
