= Jaron Pierre Jr. =

American basketball player (born 2002)

No. 10 – New Orleans Pelicans
- Position: Shooting guard
- Conference: NBA

Personal information
- Born: July 12, 2002 (age 24) New Orleans, Louisiana, U.S.
- Listed height: 6 ft 6 in (1.98 m)
- Listed weight: 206 lb (93 kg)

Career information
- High school: St. Augustine (New Orleans, Louisiana)
- College: Southern Miss (2020–2022); Wichita State (2022–2023); Jacksonville State (2024–2025); SMU (2025–2026)
- NBA draft: 2026: 2nd round, 58th overall pick
- Drafted by: New Orleans Pelicans
- Playing career: 2026–present

Career history
- 2026–present: New Orleans Pelicans
- 2026–present: →Laketown Squadron

Career highlights
- Conference USA Player of the Year (2025); First-team All-Conference USA (2025)
- Stats at NBA.com
- Stats at Basketball Reference

Jaron Pierre Jr. (born July 12, 2002) is an American basketball player for the New Orleans Pelicans of the National Basketball Association (NBA), on a two-way contract with the Laketown Squadron of the NBA G League. He played college basketball for the Southern Miss Golden Eagles, Wichita State Shockers, Jacksonville State Gamecocks, and SMU Mustangs.

== High school career ==
Pierre attended St. Augustine High School in New Orleans, Louisiana. After his high school career, he committed to play college basketball at University of Southern Mississippi.

== College career ==
Pierre played two seasons with the Golden Eagles, averaging 8.8 points as a true freshman and 9.9 points as a sophomore. At the conclusion of his sophomore season, he transferred to Wichita State University. As a junior, he averaged 10.6 points per game before entering the transfer portal for a second time. Pierre transferred again to Grambling State University where he reportedly redshirted for the Tigers men's basketball team for the entire year. However, Pierre was not listed on Grambling's 2023–2024 basketball roster and, according to an interview in Southern Methodist University's (SMU's) The Daily Campus, he enrolled in Grambling so as to focus on academics, spend a year "without basketball" and find himself. He transferred for a third time to Jacksonville State University, where he made an instant impact at the beginning of the 2024–25 season. Against Middle Tennessee State, he scored a career-high 36 points, setting the school record for most points scored in a game at home. At the conclusion of the season, Pierre was named Conference USA Player of the Year and subsequently put his name in the transfer portal while putting his name in the 2025 NBA draft. Following the season he had at Jacksonville, Pierre transferred to SMU and subsequently withdrew his name from the 2025 NBA draft. During his singular season at SMU, he appeared in every single game for the Mustangs. At the conclusion of the season, Pierre averaged 17.6 points, 4.9 rebounds, and 2.1 assists. On March 18, 2026, shortly after the regular season, SMU played against the Miami RedHawks in the 2026 March Madness tournament, where in his lone March Madness appearance, Pierre scored 18 points, four rebounds, assists, and three steals in 39 minutes of playtime in a ten-point 79-89 loss to the team. On April 15, 2026, Pierre announced on Instagram that he had declared for the 2026 NBA draft. On July 15, 2026, Pierre was named for the NABC Team Academic Excellence Honoree award.

== Professional career ==
On June 24, 2026, Pierre was selected with the 58th overall pick by the New Orleans Pelicans. Pierre became the first SMU draft pick following the draft of Shake Milton in 2018, he also became the first New Orleans native to be drafted by the team. On July 24, Pierre signed a two-way contract with the Pelicans and their NBA G League affiliate, the Laketown Squadron.

== Career statistics ==
Legend
GP	Games played	GS	Games started	MPG	Minutes per game
FG%	Field goal percentage	3P%	3-point field goal percentage	FT%	Free throw percentage
RPG	Rebounds per game	APG	Assists per game	SPG	Steals per game
BPG	Blocks per game	PPG	Points per game	**Bold**	Career high

=== College ===
Year	Team	GP	GS	MPG	FG%	3P%	FT%	RPG	APG	SPG	BPG	PPG
2020–21	Southern Miss	24	16	24.5	.386	.337	.750	3.5	1.5	**1.1**	.2	8.8
2021–22	Southern Miss	27	15	27.5	.342	.333	.760	3.1	1.4	.6	.1	9.9
2022–23	Wichita State	31	22	28.1	.390	.282	.722	3.0	1.2	.5	.2	10.6
2023–24	Grambling State	0	Redshirt									
2024–25	Jacksonville State	**36**	**36**	**37.6**	**.424**	**.382**	**.810**	**5.5**	**3.8**	.7	**.4**	**21.6**
2025–26	SMU	34	32	33.2	.462	.370	.758	4.9	2.1	1.0	**.4**	17.6
Career		152	121	30.8	.411	.347	.779	4.1	2.1	.8	.3	14.4
