= H. S. Williams House =

Building in Rockledge, Florida, United States

Coordinates: 28.331339°N 80.71552°W

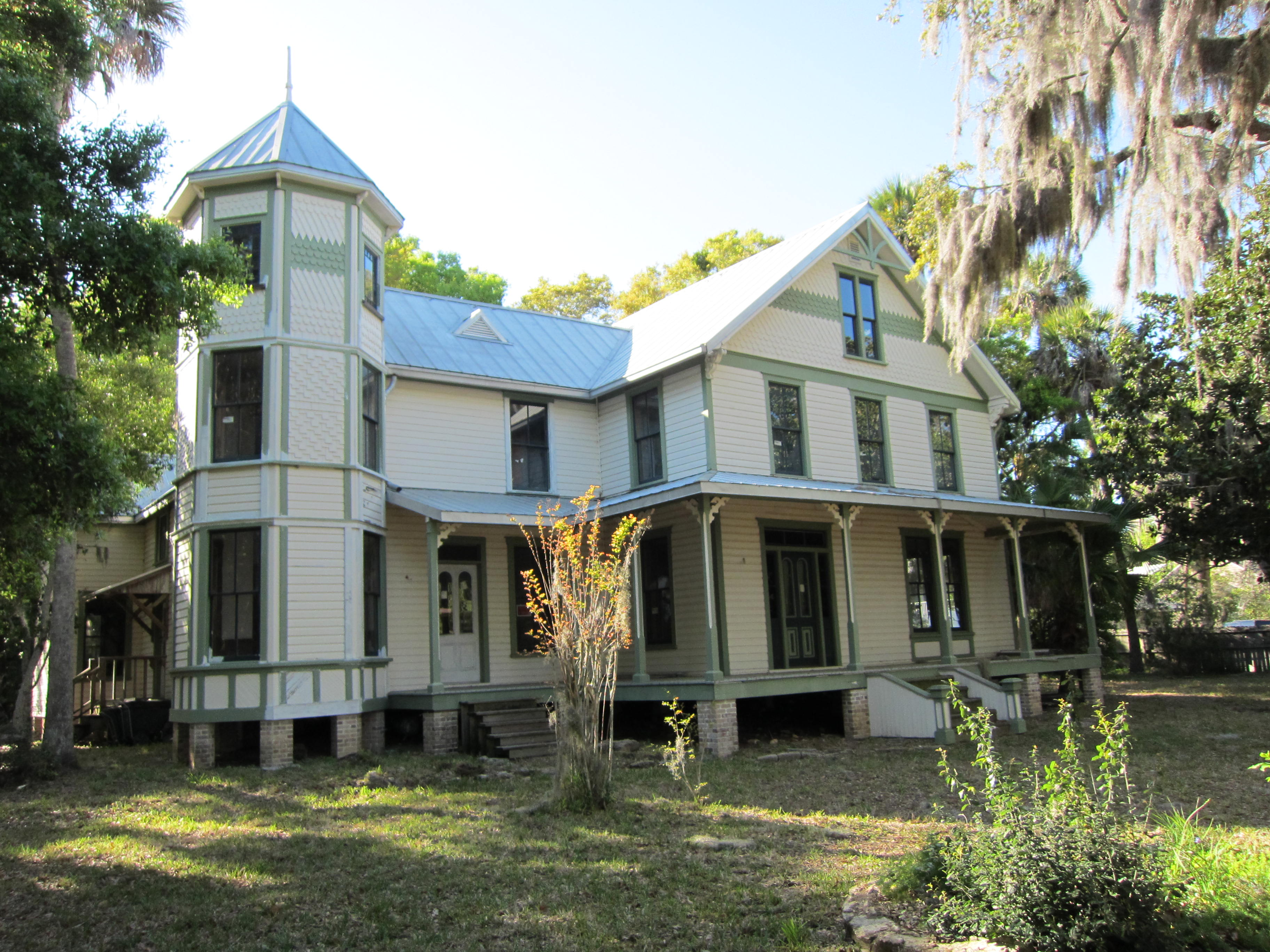
- Interactive map of the H. S. Williams House area

General information
- Type: House
- Architectural style: Queen Anne
- Location: 1219 Rockledge Drive; Rockledge, Florida
- Construction started: 1880; 146 years ago
- Governing body: Brevard County

Technical details
- Floor area: Three Story

Website
- Lawndale House Museum website

The H. S. Williams House, known as Lawndale, is a historic U.S. home in Rockledge, Florida along the Indian River. Hiram Smith Williams built the house in 1880 after moving to the area in 1874 from Alabama.

A native of New Jersey, Williams had lived and traveled in the Midwest but settled in 1859 in Livingston, Alabama. During the American Civil War, Williams enlisted in the Confederate Army as a private and served with the 40th Alabama Volunteer Regiment. During his service, he penned a journal that historians have praised for its clarity of its writing and keen observations about the daily life of a soldier. He was captured on 19 March 1865 during the Battle of Bentonville, North Carolina and remained a prisoner until the end of the war.

Once settled in Florida, Williams grew citrus, founded the Brevard Telephone Company, and served as a Florida State Senator. He became the first postmaster of Rockledge after establishing the post office in 1875. He died in 1921.

The house was built in the Queen Anne style and retained its original architectural features in both the interior and exterior. The first floor consists of a foyer, a dining room, two parlors, a kitchen and a restroom. The second floor consists of three bedrooms, an office, a guest room, a bathroom and a schoolroom. The schoolroom, situated above the kitchen was used as a schoolroom for children, and was one of the first schools in the county. Brevard County purchased the home in 1989 and restored it. In 2012, the Preservation and Education Trust from Rockledge raised money to convert the historic home house into a museum, which opened to the public for guided tours in December 2020.

The house is located in the Rockledge Drive Residential District, in the National Register of Historic Places.
