= Valencia Subdivision Residential District =

Historic district in Florida, United States

- U.S. National Register of Historic Places
- U.S. Historic district
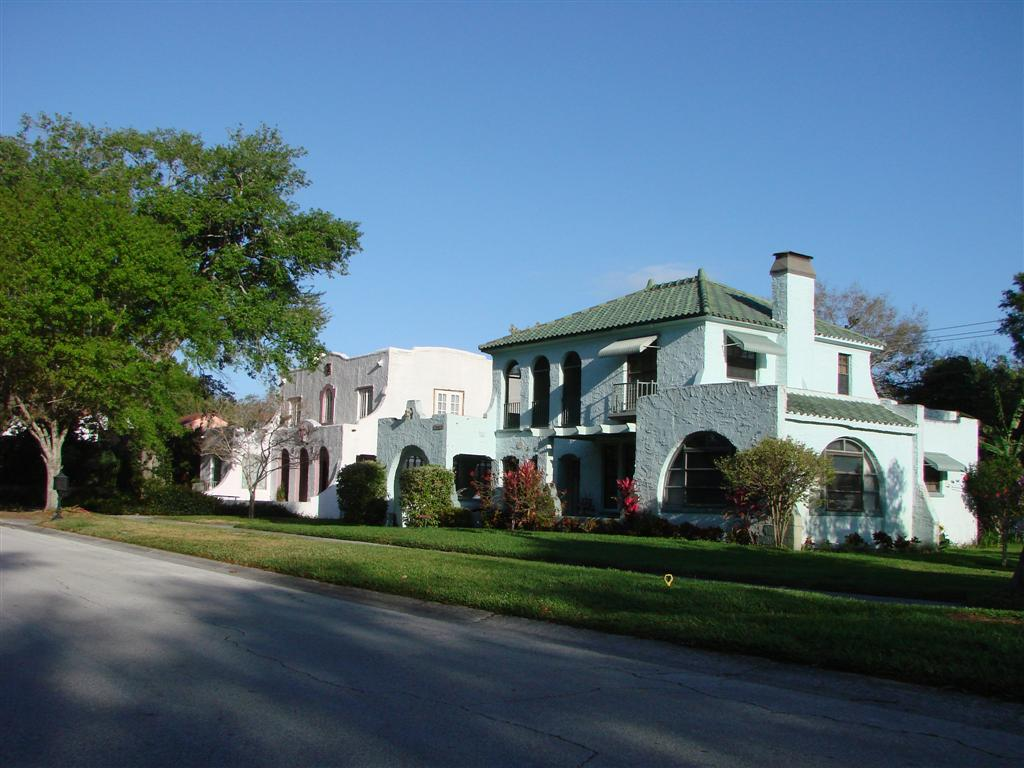
- Houses in the subdivision

- Location within Florida Location within the United States
- Location: Rockledge, Florida
- Coordinates: 28°20′11.78″N 80°43′19.33″W
- Area: 100 acres (40 ha)
- NRHP reference No.: 92001047
- Added to NRHP: August 21, 1992

The Valencia Subdivision Residential District is a historic district in Rockledge, Florida. It runs from 14 through 140 Valencia Road, 825 through 827 Osceola Drive and 24 through 28 Orange Avenue, encompasses approximately 100 acres (40 ha), and contains 54 historic buildings and 2 objects. On August 21, 1992, it was added to the U.S. National Register of Historic Places.
