= Chris Mudge =

American basketball coach (born 1984)

Current position
- Title: Head coach
- Team: Sam Houston
- Conference: C-USA
- Record: 56–43 (.566)

Biographical details
- Born: June 15, 1984 (age 42); Round Rock, Texas, U.S.
- Education: Texas ('06)

Coaching career (HC unless noted)
- 2006–2008: Texas (GA)
- 2008–2010: Midland (asst.)
- 2010–2021: Sam Houston (asst.)
- 2021–2023: Sam Houston (assoc. HC)
- 2023–present: Sam Houston

Administrative career (AD unless noted)
- 2002–2006: Texas (manager)

Head coaching record
- Overall: 56–43 (.566)
- Tournaments: 0–1 (NIT)

Accomplishments and honors

Championships
- CUSA regular season (2024)

Awards
- 2× C-USA Coach of the Year (2024, 2026)

Chris Mudge (born June 15, 1984) is an American basketball coach. He is the head coach of the Sam Houston Bearkats men's basketball team.

== Coaching career ==
Mudge served as a student manager and graduate assistant at Texas under Rick Barnes before landing his first assistant coaching job at Midland College, a NJCAA, where he stayed from 2008 to 2010. He'd join Jason Hooten's staff in 2010, and would stay on through 2023 where he was part of six postseason appearances for the Bearkats.

After Hooten left to accept the head coaching position at New Mexico State, Mudge was promoted to the head coaching position. On April 3, Sam Houston State promoted Mudge to become their next head coach.

== Head coaching record ==
Record table
| Season | Team | Overall | Conference | Standing | Postseason |
|---|---|---|---|---|---|
Sam Houston Bearkats (Conference USA) (2023–present)
| 2023–24 | Sam Houston | 21–12 | 13–3 | 1st | |
| 2024–25 | Sam Houston | 13–19 | 6–12 | 9th | |
| 2025–26 | Sam Houston | 22–12 | 13–7 | 2nd | NIT First Round |
| Sam Houston: | | 56–43 (.566) | 32–22 (.593) | | |
| Total: | | 56–43 (.566) | | | |
National champion Postseason invitational champion Conference regular season champion Conference regular season and conference tournament champion Division regular season champion Division regular season and conference tournament champion Conference tournament champion
