= 1986 Southland Conference men's basketball tournament =

- Classification: Division I
- Season: 1985–86
- Teams: 7
- First round site: Campus Sites; Campus Arenas
- Finals site: Fant-Ewing Coliseum; Monroe, Louisiana
- Champions: Northeast Louisiana (1st title)
- Winning coach: Mike Vining (1st title)
- MVP: Arthur Hayes (Northeast Louisiana)

1985–86 Southland Conference men's basketball standings
	Conf.				Overall
Team	W		L	PCT	W		L	PCT
NE Louisiana †	9	–	3	.750	20	–	10	.667
McNeese State	8	–	4	.667	21	–	11	.656
Arkansas State	7	–	5	.583	18	–	11	.621
Lamar	6	–	6	.500	18	–	12	.600
Louisiana Tech	6	–	6	.500	20	–	14	.588
North Texas State	4	–	8	.333	10	–	18	.357
UT Arlington	2	–	10	.167	12	–	18	.400
† 1986 Southland Conference tournament winner Rankings from AP Poll

The 1986 Southland Conference men's basketball tournament was held March 4–6, 1986 with quarterfinal matchups being held at the home arena of the higher seed and the semifinals and championship game played at Fant-Ewing Coliseum in Monroe, Louisiana.

Northeast Louisiana defeated McNeese State in the championship game, 59–57, to win their first Southland men's basketball tournament.

The Indians received a bid to the 1986 NCAA Tournament as No. 13 seed in the West region. They were the only Southland member invited to the NCAA tournament. McNeese, Lamar, and Louisiana Tech received invitations to the 1986 NIT Tournament.

== Format ==
All seven of the conference's members participated in the tournament field. They were seeded based on regular season conference records, with the top seed earning a bye into the semifinal round. The other six teams began play in the quarterfinal round.

First round games were played at the home court of the higher-seeded team. All remaining games were played at the Fant-Ewing Coliseum in Monroe, Louisiana.

== Bracket ==
Quarterfinals; Tuesday, March 4
4	Lamar	58
5	Louisiana Tech	60
3	Arkansas State	79
6	North Texas State	71
2	McNeese State	83
7	Texas-Arlington	71

Semifinals; Wednesday, March 5
1	NE Louisiana	57
5	Louisiana Tech	56
3	Arkansas State	57
2	McNeese State	68

Championship; Thursday, March 6
1	NE Louisiana	59
2	McNeese State	57
