= Marion S. Whaley Citrus Packing House =

- Formerly listed on the U.S. National Register of Historic Places
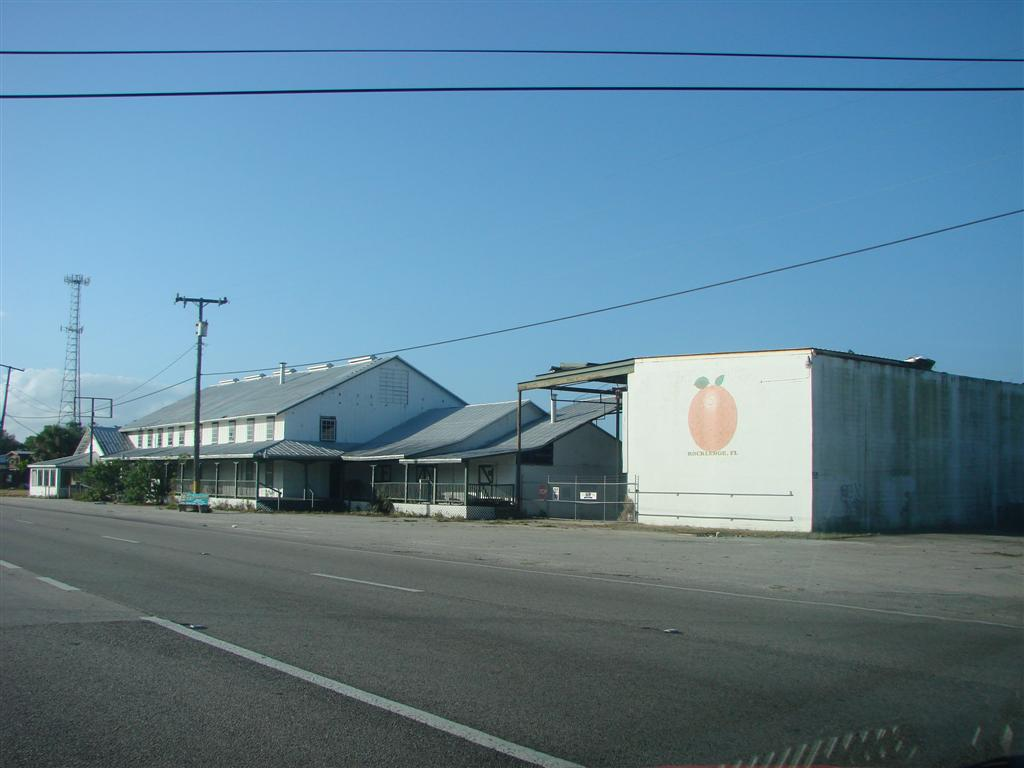

- Location within Florida Location within the United States
- Location: 2275 South US Highway 1 Rockledge, Florida
- Coordinates: 28°18′46″N 80°42′37″W
- Built: 1930
- Architectural style: Vernacular, Frame
- NRHP reference No.: 93000286

Significant dates
- Added to NRHP: April 08, 1993
- Removed from NRHP: January 26, 2021

The Marion S. Whaley Citrus Packing House (also known as the Sullivan Brothers Victory Groves Citrus Packing House) was a historic site in Rockledge, Florida. It is located at 2275 U.S. 1. On April 8, 1993, it was added to the U.S. National Register of Historic Places.

== History ==
The structure was first built in 1928 as the Whaley Packing House, by the Whaley family. It would be renamed the Whaley Victory Groves Packing House after World War 2, which it would keep until it was sold in 1960. That year, it was purchased by the Sullivan family, whose previous packing house in what is now Cocoa Village burned down the previous year. They would rename it to the Sullivan Victory Groves Packing House, and were responsible for expanding the building several times. Business would decline from a variety of factors including the loss of orange groves to NASA land purchases, Citrus canker outbreaks, and abnormally low temperatures, leading to the packing house to close for good in 1991. It was added to the U.S. National Register of Historic Places on April 8, 1993, and would later be sold for $749,000 in 1998. The property would be seized the bank in 2001, and shortly thereafter sold to Redi LLC who failed to find any buyers for the property. Demolition began on July 16, 2020, 2 years after Rockledge, Florida city inspectors declared the building unsafe. It was removed from the National Register in 2021.

== References and external links ==
Media related to Marion S. Whaley Citrus Packing House at Wikimedia Commons

- Brevard County listings at National Register of Historic Places
