= First Battle of Dalton =

Battle of the American Civil War

Coordinates: 34.8031°N 85.0124°W

- Part of the American Civil War
Date	February 22, 1864 – February 27, 1864
Location	Whitfield County, Georgia
Result	Confederate victory

Belligerents
United States of America (Union)	Confederate States of America

Commanders and leaders
George H. Thomas	Joseph E. Johnston

Units involved
Army of the Cumberland	Army of Tennessee

Strength
25,000	40,000

Casualties and losses
300	140

The First Battle of Dalton was a series of American Civil War skirmishes that took place between February 22 and February 27, 1864, in Whitfield County, Georgia.

== Battle ==
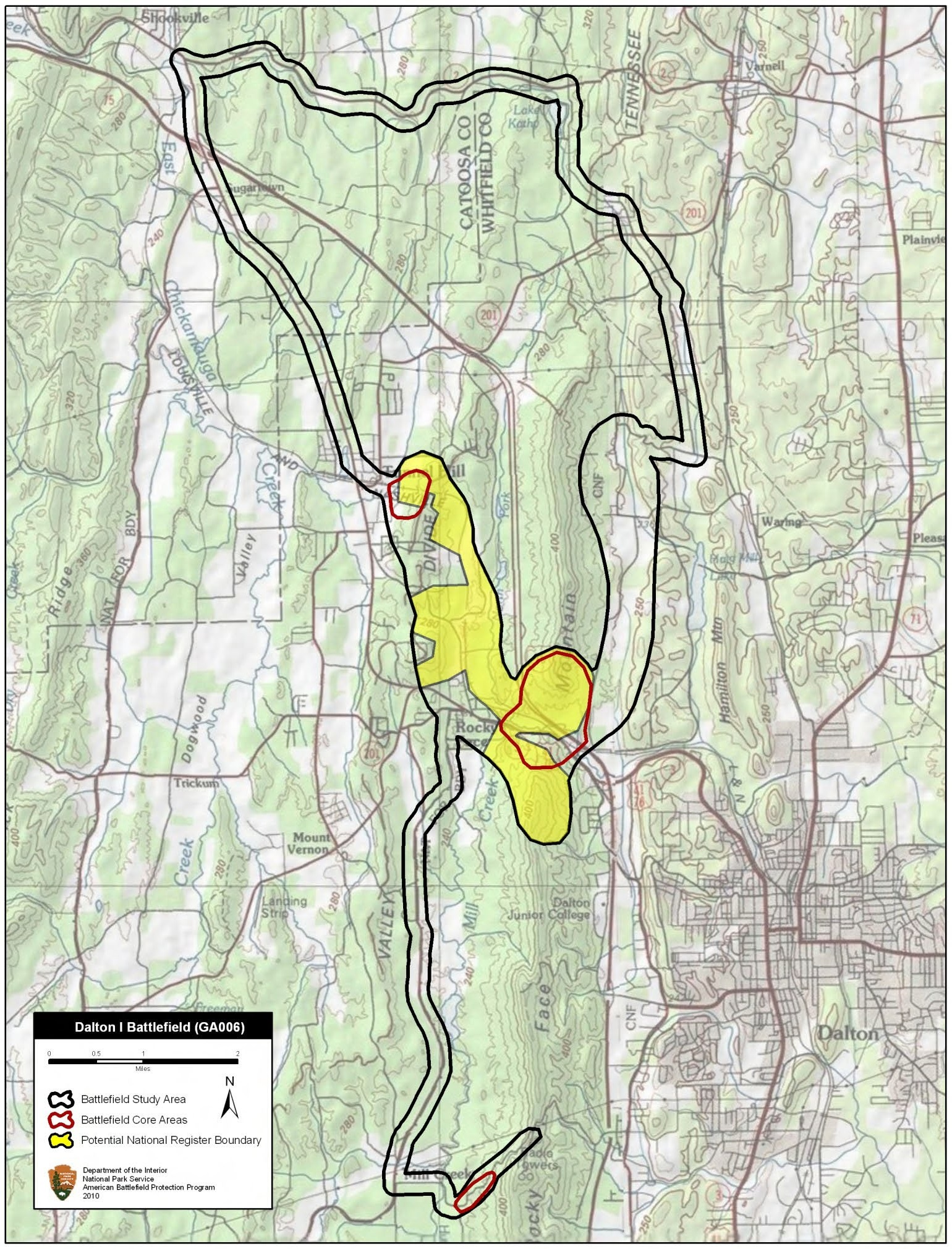
Map of Dalton I Battlefield core and study areas by the American Battlefield Protection Program.

At the suggestion of Union Major General Ulysses S. Grant, Major General George H. Thomas, decided to probe General Joseph E. Johnston's strength to determine if the loss of two full divisions to reinforce Confederate forces elsewhere had made the Confederate Army of Tennessee vulnerable to Union attack. On February 22, Thomas began the reconnaissance movement, which consisted of three columns of Union troops. After several days of intense skirmishing, Thomas's army retreated, since it was obvious that Johnston was still capable of repelling a major Union assault. Thomas's force had lost 300 officers and men killed or wounded, against 140 men for the Confederates.

== Battlefield condition ==
Much of the battlefield landscape has been compromised by Interstate 75, development along US Route 41, the growth of the City of Dalton, and subdivision of the Crow Valley and Tunnel Hill areas.
