= Rockledge, Florida =

- City
- City of Rockledge
- Seal
- Motto(s): "Oldest City in Brevard"; Preserving the Past, Planning the Future"
- Location in Brevard County and the state of Florida
- Coordinates: 28°19′40″N 80°45′20″W
- Country: United States
- State: Florida
- County: Brevard
- Incorporated: August 7, 1887

Government
  - Type: Council-Manager

Area
  - Total: 14.93 sq mi (38.68 km^{2})
  - Land: 13.22 sq mi (34.24 km^{2})
  - Water: 1.71 sq mi (4.44 km^{2})
- Elevation: 23 ft (7.0 m)

Population (2020)
  - Total: 27,678
  - Density: 2,093.8/sq mi (808.44/km^{2})
- Time zone: UTC-5 (Eastern (EST))
  - Summer (DST): UTC-4 (EDT)
- ZIP Codes: 32955, 32956
- Area code: 321
- FIPS code: 12-61500
- GNIS feature ID: 2404638
- Website: cityofrockledge.org

Rockledge /ˈrɒklɪdʒ, -ˌlɛdʒ/ is the oldest city in Brevard County, Florida. The city's population was 27,678 at the 2020 Census, up from 24,926 at the 2010 United States census, and is part of the Palm Bay−Melbourne−Titusville Metropolitan Statistical Area.

== History ==
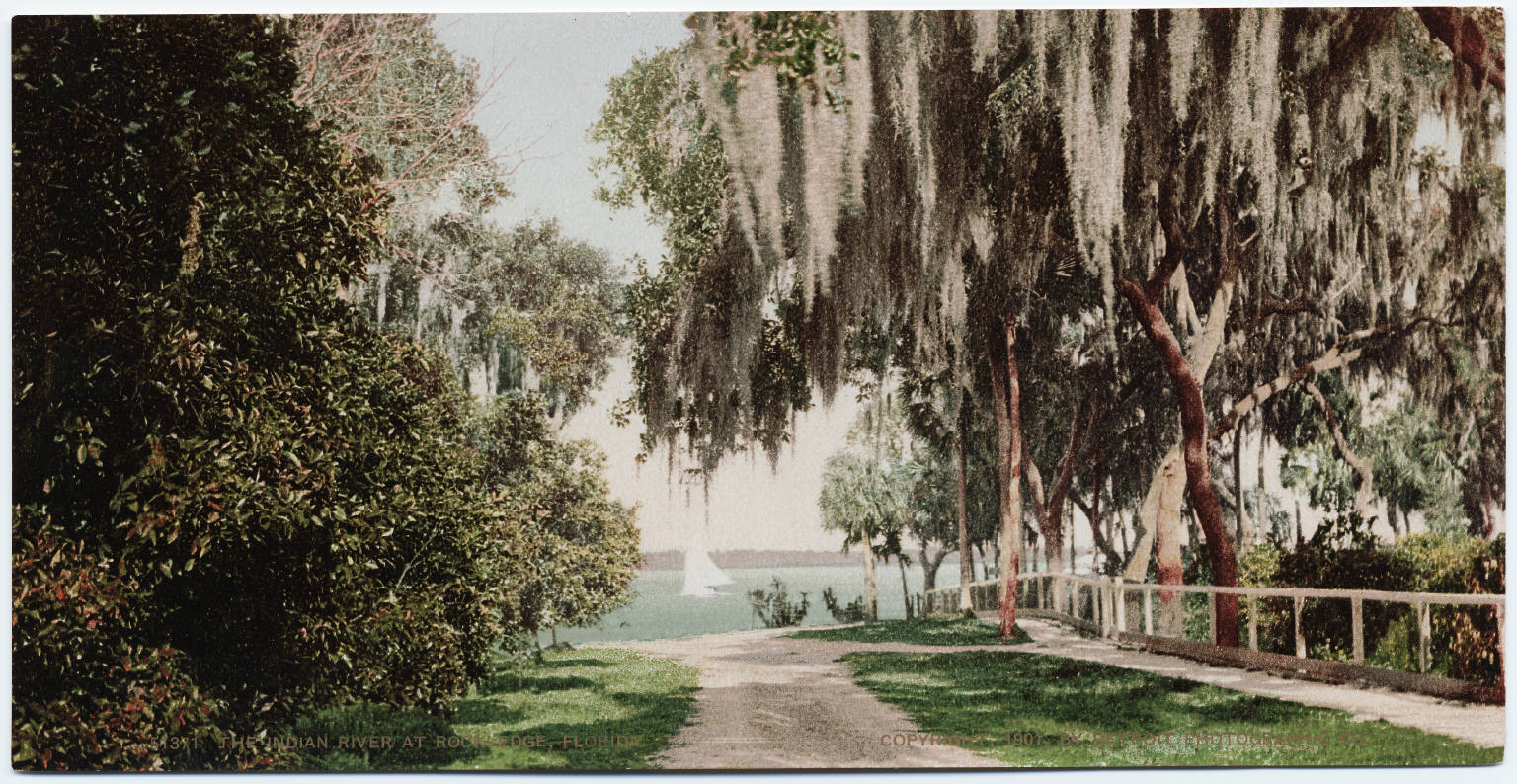
A view of early Rockledge, FL and the Indian River

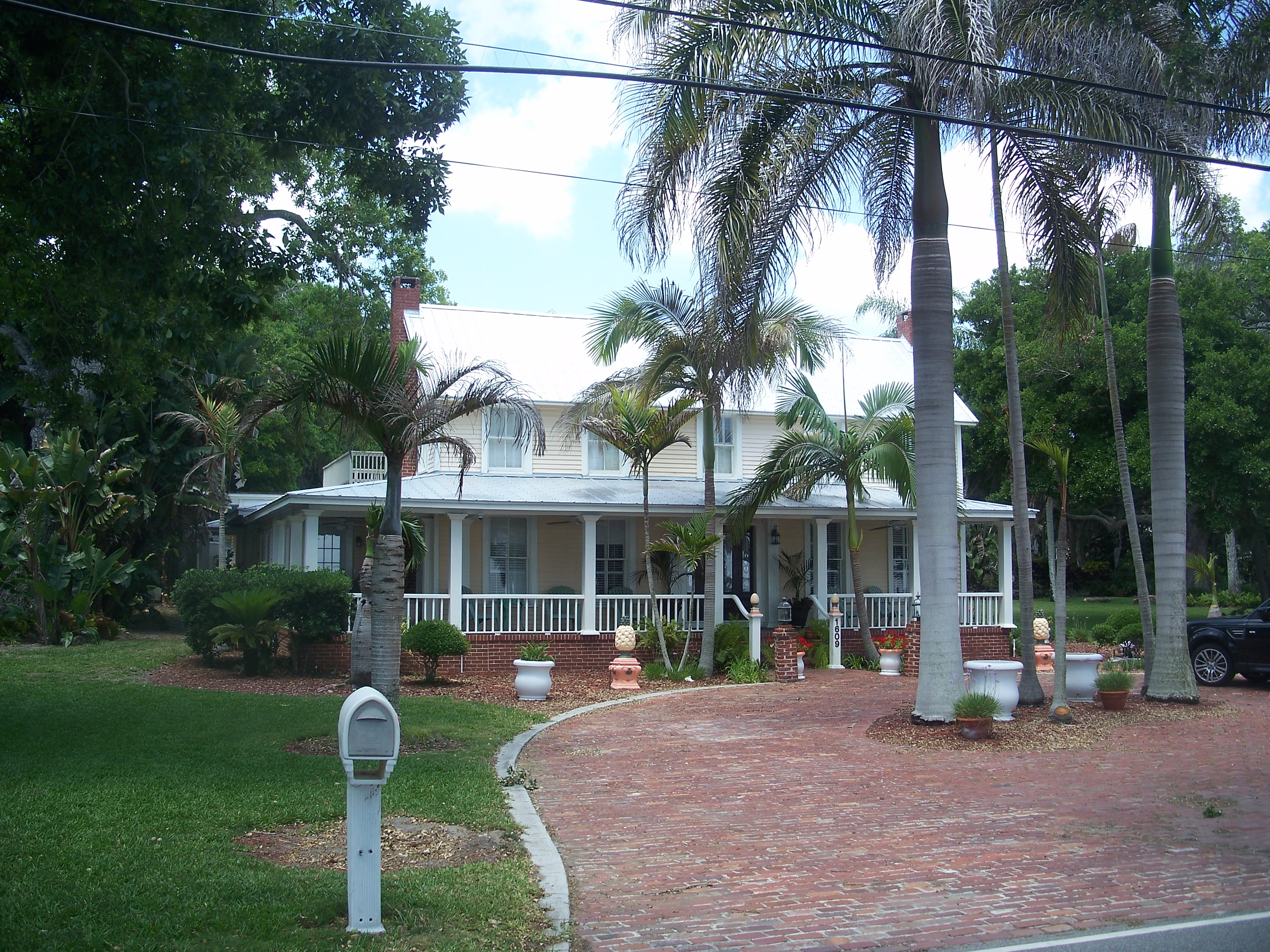
Modern-day picture of the Magruder-Whaley House

Rockledge was officially founded on August 7, 1887, making it the oldest incorporated municipality in Brevard County. The name Rockledge, attributed to Gardner S. Hardee, an early settler, comes from the many ledges of coquina rock that line the Indian River. Other sources refer to a man named Cephas Bailey Magruder, who built his home after settling in the area in 1876 near the Indian River. Magruder called his home "the rockledge home" and the name was eventually attributed to the whole town. It was originally referred to as Rock Ledge; the two-word name persisted through the 19th century. Early industry in the area was based on the citrus trade and accommodation for tourists traveling to South Florida via the Atlantic Intracoastal Waterway of the Indian River.

President Grover Cleveland and his wife visited the city in 1888.

The town had several large hotels in the late 19th century to the early 20th century that catered to Northern tourists escaping cold winters. These included the Hotel Indian River, the Plaza, and the Rockledge Hotel, all located north of Barton Avenue, looking out over the river.

Towards the early part of the 20th century, Rockledge was known as a resort town. In the winter months, the population would rise from 200 to almost 2,000 people. Up until about 1911, access to Rockledge was via boat and rail. Steamboats in the Indian River connected with Henry Flagler's trains to bring people to the North. Small boats, sailboats, and small launches frequently stopped to unload freight and passengers. Most of the tourists in this time were wealthy and would use the boats to connect to the rail system at that time. After World War I, the automobile allowed the average person to travel to the area and their encampments dotted the area. The Dixie Highway was completed in 1915 and spanned most of Florida. In the 1920s, US1 was paved and replaced the Dixie Highway.

In 1939–1940, a winter visitor donated the money to construct a hospital. The mayor convinced the council to donate land from the former golf course that had belonged to the defunct Indian River Hotel for the hospital. In 1941, 10-bed Wuesthoff Hospital was established with a $12,500 gift given by the heirs of Eugene Wuesthoff and matching contributions from 500 Rockledge community residents.

Rockledge underwent an expansion further west and south in the 1960s when it became a bedroom community for the nearby Kennedy Space Center. Several hundred families from all over the United States settled in the city with the advent of the Apollo missions and the space shuttle program. Recently in 2022 and 2023, the City has annexed property west of Interstate 95.

Barton Boulevard supplements US Route 1 as the town's economic and cultural center as new subdivisions spread south along Fiske Boulevard. Main commercial centers are now along Fiske Boulevard, Murrell Road, and Barnes Boulevard. By the 1970s, the bulk of Rockledge's population lived between US Route 1 and Interstate 95. This is still true in 2023, yet multi-use development is expected on the west side of Interstate 95.

Developments stretched north to south from the late 1950s to the 1990s. Virginia Park, Marlin Manor, Fairway Estates, Rockledge Country Club Estates, Golfview Estates, Kings Grant, Georgetown, Levitt Park and Woodsmere had all been established by the 1960s–1980s.

Levitt Park and Woodsmere were built atop a gladiola farm and an orange grove. The huge Australian Pine trees at the southernmost points of Fiske Boulevard are all that remain of the grove's windbreaks. The subdivision of Silver Pines, while part of unincorporated Brevard County outside the city limit, was also built during this period and is identified by citizens as a part of the city.

== Geography ==
According to the United States Census Bureau, the city has a total area of 13.4 square miles (34.8 km^{2}), of which 11.9 square miles (30.9 km^{2}) is land and 1.5 square miles (3.8 km^{2}) (11.03%) is water.

It is bounded on the north by Cocoa, on the west by the St. Johns River and scrubland, to the south by Viera (unincorporated) and Melbourne, and to the east by the Indian River Lagoon and Merritt Island (unincorporated) on the opposite shore.

=== Climate ===
Rockledge has a humid subtropical climate, Köppen climate classification Cfa. The area's warm and humid climate is caused primarily by its proximity to the Gulf Stream, which flows off the east coast of Florida. There are two major seasons which characterize the area. The warm season is hot and rainy lasting from June until late September. The cool season the dry season, October through May, brings more moderate temperatures and less frequent rainfall.

Climate data for Rockledge, Florida
Month	Jan	Feb	Mar	Apr	May	Jun	Jul	Aug	Sep	Oct	Nov	Dec	Year
Record high °F (°C)	89 (32)	92 (33)	93 (34)	97 (36)	97 (36)	101 (38)	102 (39)	101 (38)	98 (37)	96 (36)	91 (33)	89 (32)	102 (39)
Mean daily maximum °F (°C)	71 (22)	74 (23)	77 (25)	81 (27)	86 (30)	90 (32)	91 (33)	91 (33)	88 (31)	84 (29)	79 (26)	73 (23)	82 (28)
Mean daily minimum °F (°C)	49 (9)	52 (11)	55 (13)	60 (16)	67 (19)	72 (22)	73 (23)	73 (23)	73 (23)	68 (20)	60 (16)	53 (12)	63 (17)
Record low °F (°C)	17 (−8)	27 (−3)	25 (−4)	35 (2)	47 (8)	55 (13)	60 (16)	60 (16)	58 (14)	41 (5)	30 (−1)	21 (−6)	17 (−8)
Average precipitation inches (mm)	2.27 (58)	2.63 (67)	3.28 (83)	2.13 (54)	3.29 (84)	6.71 (170)	5.96 (151)	7.68 (195)	7.64 (194)	5.06 (129)	2.88 (73)	2.57 (65)	52.1 (1,323)
Source: Weather Channel accessdate February 29, 2012

=== Environment ===
Rainfall can run off from the city into the Indian River Lagoon, with resultant pollution. As a result, the city has banned fertilizing from June 1 to September 30 annually.

== Demographics ==
Historical population
Census	Pop.	Note	%±
1920	453		—
1930	551		21.6%
1940	725		31.6%
1950	1,347		85.8%
1960	3,481		158.4%
1970	10,523		202.3%
1980	11,877		12.9%
1990	16,023		34.9%
2000	20,170		25.9%
2010	24,926		23.6%
2020	27,678		11.0%
U.S. Decennial Census

=== Racial and ethnic composition ===
Rockledge racial composition (Hispanics excluded from racial categories) (NH = Non-Hispanic)
Race	Pop 2010	Pop 2020	% 2010	% 2020
White (NH)	18,569	18,820	74.50%	68.00%
Black or African American (NH)	3,506	3,684	14.07%	13.31%
Native American or Alaska Native (NH)	66	65	0.26%	0.23%
Asian (NH)	586	634	2.35%	2.29%
Pacific Islander or Native Hawaiian (NH)	25	33	0.10%	0.12%
Some other race (NH)	46	132	0.18%	0.48%
Two or more races/Multiracial (NH)	538	1,477	2.16%	5.34%
Hispanic or Latino (any race)	1,590	2,833	6.38%	10.24%
Total	24,926	27,678		

=== 2020 census ===
As of the 2020 census, Rockledge had a population of 27,678. The median age was 46.6 years. 19.2% of residents were under the age of 18 and 22.9% of residents were 65 years of age or older. For every 100 females there were 89.7 males, and for every 100 females age 18 and over there were 87.0 males age 18 and over.

99.8% of residents lived in urban areas, while 0.2% lived in rural areas.

There were 11,451 households in Rockledge, of which 26.3% had children under the age of 18 living in them. Of all households, 47.7% were married-couple households, 16.3% were households with a male householder and no spouse or partner present, and 29.3% were households with a female householder and no spouse or partner present. About 27.1% of all households were made up of individuals and 12.9% had someone living alone who was 65 years of age or older.

There were 12,251 housing units, of which 6.5% were vacant. The homeowner vacancy rate was 1.5% and the rental vacancy rate was 6.9%.

Racial composition as of the 2020 census
Race	Number	Percent
White	19,535	70.6%
Black or African American	3,777	13.6%
American Indian and Alaska Native	105	0.4%
Asian	646	2.3%
Native Hawaiian and Other Pacific Islander	37	0.1%
Some other race	753	2.7%
Two or more races	2,825	10.2%
Hispanic or Latino (of any race)	2,833	10.2%

=== 2010 census ===
As of the 2010 census, there were 24,926 people, 9,310 households, and 7,002 families residing in the city.

In 2010, the city had the lowest percentage of people living in poverty of any municipality measured in the county, 5%, compared to an average of 10% countywide.

=== 2000 census ===
As of the census of 2000, there were 20,170 people, 7,864 households, and 5,677 families residing in the city. The population density was 1,884.4 inhabitants per square mile (727.6/km^{2}). There were 8,353 housing units at an average density of 780.4 per square mile (301.3/km^{2}). The racial makeup of the city was 81.06% White, 14.64% African American, 0.28% Native American, 1.66% Asian, 0.08% Pacific Islander, 0.73% from other races, and 1.56% from two or more races. Hispanic or Latino of any race were 3.28% of the population.

In 2000, there were 7,864 households, out of which 31.0% had children living with them, 56.8% were married couples living together, 11.9% had a female householder with no husband present, and 27.8% were non-families. 22.5% of all households were made up of individuals, and 9.5% had someone living alone who was 65 years of age or older. The average household size was 2.51 and the average family size was 2.93.

Per the 2000 census, the population was distributed as follows: 23.8% under the age of 18, 6.0% from 18 to 24, 28.6% from 25 to 44, 25.2% from 45 to 64, and 16.4% who were 65 years of age or older.

In 2000, the median age was 40 years. For every 100 females, there were 90.6 males. For every 100 females age 18 and over, there were 87.3 males.

== Points of interest ==
- Barton Avenue Residential District
- H. S. Williams House
- Marion S. Whaley Citrus Packing House
- Persimmon Mound
- Rockledge Drive Residential District
- Valencia Subdivision Residential District

== Parks and recreation ==
Rockledge has the following parks:

- Anderson Stormwater Park
- Barton Park [under construction]
- Columbia Park
- Dick Blake Park
- Cruickshank Sanctuary
- Golfview Park
- Holland Park
- McClarty Park
- Memorial Walk at Levitt Park
- Morris Park
- Raider Park
- River Groves Dock
- Riverwalk - A Family Park
- Rockledge Park
- Silver Pines Park
- Taylor Park
- Valencia Dock

== Government ==
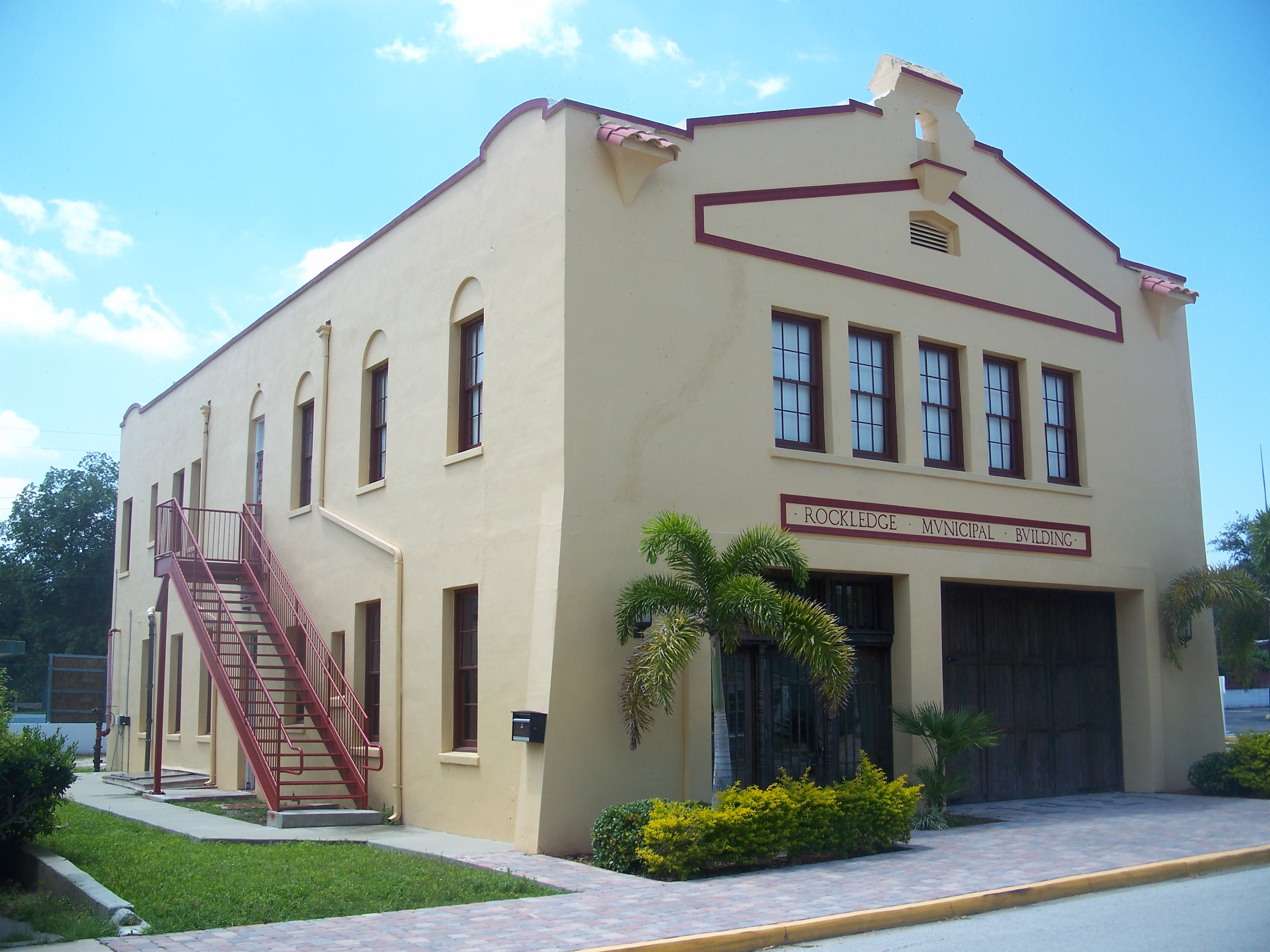
City of Rockledge's First City Hall; now used for community events

The City of Rockledge functions under a Council-Manager government. The Mayor and City Council members are elected to three-year terms. There are six City Council members whose terms are staggered to allow election of two council seats each year. The city holds municipal elections on the first Tuesday after the first Monday of November each year.

While the Mayor and the City Council act as the legislative body of the City of Rockledge, the actual operation of the city and its functions lies with the city manager and his departmental support staff consisting of assistant city manager/finance director, city clerk/public relations officer, building official, fire chief, chief of police, director of public works and director of wastewater treatment and water reclamation.

The chairman of the City Council appoints members of the City Council to serve on subcommittees and to represent the City Council on other governmental bodies that require the city's input.

In 2013, there were 237 city employees.

=== Finances ===
In 2007, the city had a taxable real estate base of $1.55 billion.

In 2009–2010, the city paid $2.2 million for solid waste disposal. This was furnished at a cost of $168.48 annually per residence. Non residential (business) collection cost $632.89 each, annually.

=== Police ===
Rockledge has approximately fifty full-time certified police officers serving the city. In addition, there are 18 support staff positions, five reserve officers, eight crossing guards, and seven civilian volunteers. All police officers must be certified by the State of Florida. In August 2011, the new $4 million police headquarters was finished and it is located at 1776 Jack Oates Blvd. The old police station on Barton Blvd may be home to a future library and other non-profit organizations, who will lease the former police headquarters from the city.

=== Fire protection ===
Along with one other city in the county, Rockledge has its own fire department with three stations. There is a county fire department within the city limits.

=== Boards and committees ===
The City of Rockledge contains several citizen-run boards and committees that make recommendations to the city on various issues. The positions held on the boards and committees are on a voluntary basis and non-paid. The boards and committees of Rockledge are:

- Board of Adjustment
- Board of Adjustment and Appeals
- Business Development Committee
- Citizens Advisory Committee
- Citizens Recreation Advisory Board
- Code Enforcement Board
- Community Redevelopment Agency Board of Commissioners
- Education Advisory Committee
- Planning Commission
- Retirement Board, Fire Employees
- Retirement Board, General Employees
- Retirement Board, Police Employees
- The Rockledge Environmental Enhancement Board

The city publishes an official newsletter for residents of Rockledge.

=== Mayors ===
1. Fiske 1929–1933
2. Geiger 1940–1952
3. J.W. Wilkins 1957–1958
4. Curt Barnes 1959–1962
5. J.W. Wilkins 1963–1964
6. Grady 1965–1974
7. Jack Oates 1975–1998
8. Larry L. Schultz 1999–2010
9. Thomas J. Price 2011–current

== Economy ==
Local businesses focus on technology and aerospace, especially those related to nearby Kennedy Space Center and Cape Canaveral.

Citrus grove production is nominal, producing citrus confections, juice and souvenirs for the tourist trade and for local consumption.

=== Personal income ===
The median income for a household in the city was $45,218, and the median income for a family was $52,332. Males had a median income of $39,434 versus $25,918 for females. The per capita income for the city was $20,700. About 4.0% of families and 6.5% of the population were below the poverty line, including 6.2% of those under age 18 and 7.2% of those age 65 or over.

=== Industry ===
The leading industries in Rockledge are Educational, health and social services, 20%; Manufacturing, 12%; and Professional, scientific, management, administrative, and waste management services, 11%.

Rivian Automotive founder RJ Scaringe is from Rockledge and started the company in a Mainstream Engineering facility in Rockledge in 2009. The company began as Avera Motors and changed its name to Rivian in 2011. The company moved to Michigan in 2015.

=== Tourism ===
Rockledge has the following annual community events, festivals, and parades:

- Art/Craft Fair
- Cruise-On-In Car Show
- Independence Day Family Picnic
- Light Up Rockledge and Holiday Parade
- Memorial Day Parade
- National Night Out
- Taylor Park Fall Family Festival

=== Workforce ===
In 2007, the average size of Rockledge's labor force was 11,886. Of that group, 11,455 were employed and 431 were unemployed, for an unemployment rate of 3.6%.

Among the most common occupations in Rockledge are Management, professional, and related occupations, 36%. Sales and office occupations, 28%. and Service occupations, 15%. Approximately 72 percent of workers in Rockledge, Florida work for companies, 19 percent work for the government and 6 percent are self-employed.

=== Housing ===
Reflecting economic times, in 2008, 45 building permits were issued for 105 units. In 2007, 131 permits were issued for 158 units. Also, in 2006, an estimated 106 permits for 341 units were issued.

The median home price in 2007 was $214,965.

In February 2011, the average price of homes actually sold was $131,500.

== Education ==
The public schools in Rockledge are operated by the Brevard County Public School Board. Local schools include Hans Christian Andersen Elementary; Golfview Elementary; John F. Kennedy Middle School; Ronald McNair Magnet Middle School; and Rockledge High School.

Private schools include St. Mary's Catholic School, Rockledge Christian School, Trinity Lutheran School, and Rockledge Montessori School. Sawgrass Academy Middle was a former charter school in the town.

== Infrastructure ==
=== Transportation ===
==== Major roads ====
Rockledge is served by U.S. Route 1. Major east–west roads are oriented towards this north–south road.

The following are at least four-lane roads, unless otherwise designated.

National roads

- U.S. 1. – This road was constructed east of the railroad throughout the city. In 2010, it was widened to six lanes throughout Rockledge. A landscaped median was installed. Construction in 2010 cost $27.5 million for 2.6 miles (4.2 km). This section of the road carries approximately 45,000 vehicles daily. Major intersections include CR 502 and Barton Boulevard.
- Interstate 95 – A very small portion runs through the city at Exit 195.

State roads

- SR 519 (Fiske Blvd) is a state road which at the southernmost point connects to Stadium Parkway in Viera and at the northernmost point to SR 520 in Cocoa. SR 519 is a four-lane road. Major intersections include CR 502, Interstate 95, and Barton Boulevard.

County roads

- CR 502 (Barnes Blvd) links US 1, Murrell Road, SR 519 and I-95. CR 502 is a two-lane road except for the easternmost portion which has four lanes that eventually merge into two. Major intersections include Interstate 95, SR 519, and U.S. 1.
- CR 515 (Rockledge Drive) winds along the Indian River edge and is a portion of the Indian River Lagoon Scenic Highway. Along the road are century-old oaks and homes in late 18th century style. There are no major intersections.

==== Bus ====
- Space Coast Area Transit operates a public bus service in Rockledge and vicinity.

==== Rail ====
- The Florida East Coast Railway runs through Rockledge but does not stop. Historically, there was a stop on the Florida East Coast Railway, but it was abandoned when passenger service became unprofitable.

==== Air ====
- The city has a private runway at the Rockledge Airpark that used to be run by Aero Adventures Inc, but was closed over safety concerns in 2015. The paved runway is approximately 2000 feet with a parallel grass runway on the east side of the property, and a local mechanic operates from the former hangars.

== Notable people ==
- Lyman Barnes, Wisconsin politician, practiced law in Rockledge for five years
- Kurt Debus, former director of NASA's Launch Operations Center
- Lucas "Tiger" Fafara, II, child actor, played Tooey Brown in Leave it to Beaver (1957–1963)
- Tammy Lynn Leppert, actress who vanished in 1983
- Troy Matteson, PGA Tour and 2002 NCAA champion golfer
- DeLane Matthews, actress, played Beth Barry on Dave's World (1993–1997)
- Mel Mitchell, professional football player
- Bill Posey, former, U.S. representative, Florida senator, and Florida representative
- Laurent Robinson, professional football player
- RJ Scaringe, founder of Rivian Automotive
- Beau Taylor, MLB player, #46 catcher for the Cleveland Indians. Former catcher of the Oakland Athletics
- Scott Thompson, comedian, also known as Carrot Top, was born in Rockledge
- Melissa Witek, Miss Florida USA 2005, contestant on NBC's Treasure Hunters
