= Sam Houston Bearkats men's basketball =

Men's basketball team representing Sam Houston State University

| 2026–27 Sam Houston Bearkats men's basketball team |
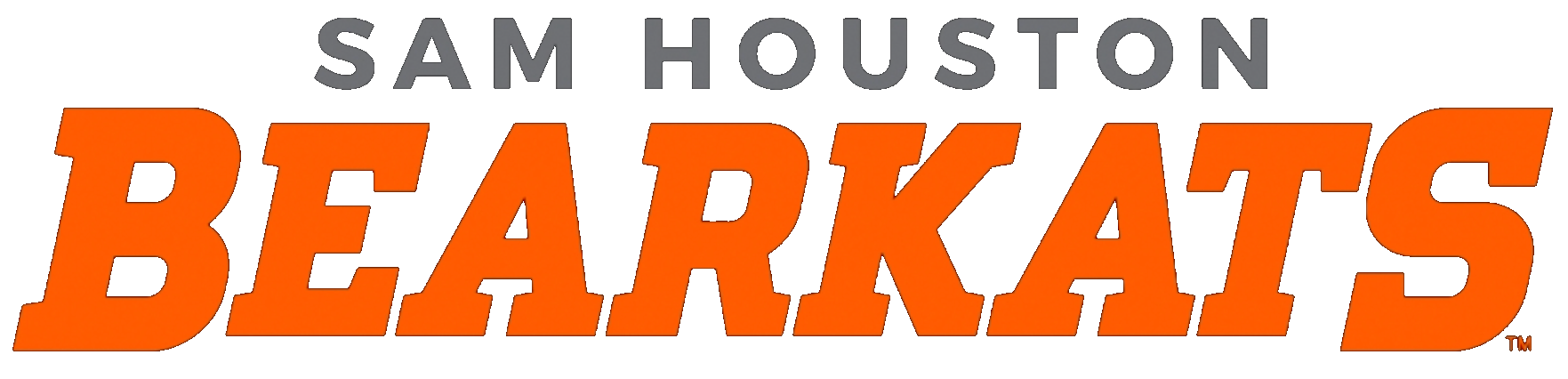
- University: Sam Houston State University
- Head coach: Chris Mudge (4th season)
- Location: Huntsville, Texas
- Arena: Bernard Johnson Coliseum (capacity: 6,110)
- Conference: Conference USA
- Nickname: Bearkats
- Colors: Orange and white

NCAA Division I tournament round of 32
- 1986*

NCAA Division I tournament appearances
- 1986*, 2003, 2010

Conference tournament champions
- Southland: 2003, 2010; Lone Star: 1975, 1981, 1982

Conference regular-season champions
- C–USA: 2024; Southland: 2000, 2003, 2010, 2019; Gulf Star: 1986; Lone Star: 1934, 1937, 1948, 1964, 1971, 1973, 1975, 1981; TIAA: 1925

Uniforms
| Home | Away |
- * at Division II level

The Sam Houston Bearkats men's basketball team, represents Sam Houston State University in Huntsville, Texas, United States. The Bearkats are currently led by head coach Chris Mudge.

The Bearkats have played home games at Johnson Coliseum, a 6,110 seat indoor arena, since 1976, when it was then called University Coliseum. Sam Houston has appeared two times in the NCAA Division I men's basketball tournament, most recently in 2010.

On July 1, 2023, the Bearkats joined Conference USA. Sam Houston had previously been a member of the Southland Conference since the 1987–88 season. Sam Houston joined the NCAA Division I level for the 1986–87 season, originally as members of the Gulf Star Conference.

== History ==
Sam Houston has a prestigious history in regards to men's basketball. The Bearkats have fielded a basketball team since 1917, excluding the 1942–43 and 1943–44 basketball seasons. Basketball was not played these years because World War II had decimated male enrollment at Sam Houston. Success began early as Sam Houston went 43–11 during its first five years, including an unblemished 24–0 record during its first three.

During the 21st century, Sam Houston's men's basketball program boasts the second-winningest program in Texas Division I, only behind Texas. The Bearkats are also the winningest program in the Southland Conference during the last decade.

=== Home Courts ===
Due to a lack of funds, it was not until 1924 that the school built the Men's Gymnasium, near the corner of 20th (now Bowers) and Avenue I. Nicknamed the "Cracker Box" Gym, the building was wood framed and lasted until the 1950s. Its most famous moment, though, did not involve athletics, but a visit by First Lady Eleanor Roosevelt in 1937.

After the demolition of the Men's Gym the school built what is referred to as the New Gymnasium or Bearkat Gymnasium (depending on the source), opening in 1956 at the corner of 20th (now Bowers) and Avenue J. This gym had room for 3,000 as well as dormitory space under the seats, and was the team's home for another 20 seasons until the opening of the University Coliseum, now known as the Bernard G. Johnson Coliseum. Located at 20th (now Bowers) and Avenue H (now Bobby K. Marks Dr), this arena still serves the university today. The second gym has undergone several conversions and is now known as Academic Building Three.

== Postseason appearances ==
=== NCAA Division I Tournament ===
The Bearkats have appeared in two NCAA Division I Tournaments. Their combined record is 0–2.

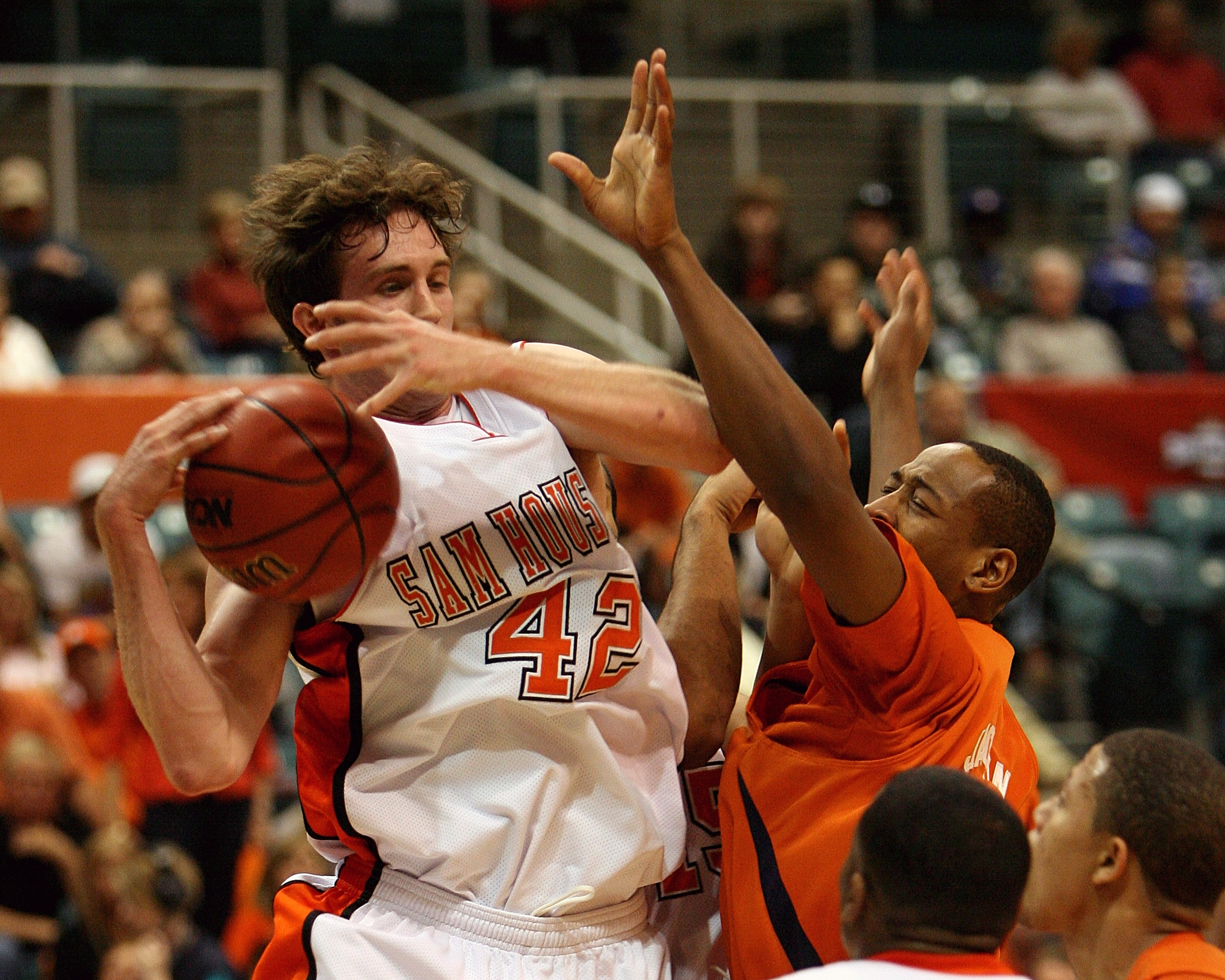
Sam Houston game in 2009

| Year | Seed | Round | Opponent | Result |
|---|---|---|---|---|
| 2003 | 15 (S) | First Round | Florida | L 55–85 |
| 2010 | 14 (S) | First Round | Baylor | L 59–68 |

=== NIT results ===
The Bearkats have appeared in three National Invitation Tournament. Their combined record is 1–3.

| Year | Round | Opponent | Result |
|---|---|---|---|
| 2019 | First Round | TCU | L 69–82 |
| 2023 | First Round; Second Round | Santa Clara; North Texas | W 58–56; L 55–75 |
| 2026 | First Round | New Mexico | L 83–107 |

=== CIT results ===
The Bearkats have appeared in the CollegeInsider.com Postseason Tournament (CIT) four times. Their combined record is 4–4.

| Year | Round | Opponent | Result |
|---|---|---|---|
| 2014 | First Round; Second Round | Alabama State; San Diego | W 71–49; L 72–77 |
| 2015 | First Round; Second Round | UNC Wilmington; Louisiana | W 87–71; L 70–71 |
| 2016 | First Round | Jackson State | L 77–81^{OT} |
| 2018 | Second Round; Quarterfinals; Semifinals | Eastern Michigan; UTSA; Northern Colorado | W 69–62; W 76–69; L 80–99 |

=== NCAA Division II Tournament ===
The Bearkats have appeared in one NCAA Division II tournament. Their record is 0–2.

| Year | Round | Opponent | Result |
|---|---|---|---|
| 1986 | Regional semifinals Regional 3rd-place game | Delta State; Abilene Christian | L 59–61; L 60–76 |

=== NAIA Tournament ===
The Bearkats have appeared in one NAIA tournament. Their record is 1–1.

| Year | Round | Opponent | Result |
|---|---|---|---|
| 1973 | First round Second Round | Wartburg; Xavier (LA) | W 88–62; L 60–67 |
