= 2004 in basketball =

The following are the basketball events of the year 2004 throughout the world.

== Champions ==
=== Olympics ===
- Men
  (gold) Argentina
  (silver) Italy
  (bronze) United States
- Women
  (gold) United States
  (silver) Australia
  (bronze) Russia

=== Professional ===
- Men
  - 2004 NBA Finals: Detroit Pistons over the Los Angeles Lakers 4-1. MVP: Chauncey Billups
    - 2003-04 NBA season
    - 2004 NBA Playoffs
    - 2004 NBA draft
    - 2004 NBA All-Star Game
  - Eurobasket: None.
  - Euroleague:
    - Maccabi Tel Aviv defeated Skipper Bologna 118-74 in the final
  - ULEB Cup
    - Hapoel Migdal Jerusalem defeated Real Madrid 83-72
- Women
  - WNBA Finals: Seattle Storm over Connecticut Sun 2-1. MVP: Betty Lennox
    - 2004 WNBA season
    - 2004 WNBA Playoffs
    - 2004 WNBA draft
    - 2004 WNBA All-Star Game
  - Eurobasket Women: None.

=== College ===
- Men
  - NCAA Division I: Connecticut 82, Georgia Tech 73
  - National Invitation Tournament: Michigan 62, Rutgers 55
  - NCAA Division II: Kennesaw State 84, Southern Indiana 59
  - NCAA Division III: UW-Stevens Point 84, Wiliams 82
  - NAIA Division I Mountain State 74, Concordia 70
  - NAIA Division II Oregon Tech 81, Bellevue (Neb.) 70
- Women
  - NCAA Division I: Connecticut 70, Tennessee 61
  - Women's National Invitation Tournament: Creighton 73, UNLV 52
  - NCAA Division II: California (Pennsylvania) 75, Drury 72
  - NCAA Division III: Wilmington (Ohio) 59, Bowdoin 53
  - NAIA Division I: Southern Nazarene 77, Oklahoma City 61
  - NAIA Division II Morningside (Iowa) 87, Cedarville (Ohio) 74

== Awards and honors ==
=== Naismith Memorial Basketball Hall of Fame ===
- Class of 2003:
  - Jerry Colangelo
  - Drazen Dalipagic
  - Clyde Drexler
  - Bill Sharman
  - Maurice Stokes
  - Lynette Woodard

=== Women's Basketball Hall of Fame ===
- Class of 2004

- Sylvia Hatchell
- Lurlyne Greer Rogers
- Amy Ruley
- Bev Smith
- William L. Wall
- Marian E. Washington

=== Professional ===
- Men
  - NBA Most Valuable Player Award: Kevin Garnett
  - NBA Rookie of the Year Award: LeBron James
  - NBA Defensive Player of the Year Award: Ron Artest
  - NBA Coach of the Year Award: Mike D'Antoni, Phoenix Suns
  - Euroscar Award: Dirk Nowitzki, Dallas Mavericks and Germany
  - Mr. Europa: Pau Gasol, Memphis Grizzlies and Spain
- Women
  - WNBA Most Valuable Player Award: Lisa Leslie, Los Angeles Sparks
  - WNBA Defensive Player of the Year Award: Lisa Leslie, Los Angeles Sparks
  - WNBA Rookie of the Year Award: Diana Taurasi, Phoenix Mercury
  - WNBA Most Improved Player Award: Kelly Miller, Charlotte Sting & Wendy Palmer, Connecticut Sun
  - Kim Perrot Sportsmanship Award: Teresa Edwards, Minnesota Lynx
  - WNBA Coach of the Year Award: Suzie McConnell-Serio, Minnesota Lynx
  - WNBA Finals Most Valuable Player Award: Betty Lennox, Seattle Storm

=== Collegiate ===
- Combined
  - Legends of Coaching Award: Mike Montgomery, Stanford
- Men
  - John R. Wooden Award: Jameer Nelson, Saint Joseph's
  - Naismith College Coach of the Year: Phil Martelli, Saint Joseph's
  - Frances Pomeroy Naismith Award: Jameer Nelson, Saint Joseph's
  - Associated Press College Basketball Player of the Year: Jameer Nelson, Saint Joseph's
  - NCAA basketball tournament Most Outstanding Player: Sean May, North Carolina
  - USBWA National Freshman of the Year: Luol Deng, Duke
  - Associated Press College Basketball Coach of the Year: Phil Martelli, Saint Joseph's
  - Naismith Outstanding Contribution to Basketball: George Killian
- Women
  - John R. Wooden Award: Alana Beard, Duke
  - Naismith College Player of the Year: Diana Taurasi, Connecticut
  - Naismith College Coach of the Year: Pat Summitt, Tennessee
  - Wade Trophy: Alana Beard, Duke
  - Frances Pomeroy Naismith Award: Erika Valek, Purdue
  - Associated Press Women's College Basketball Player of the Year: Alana Beard, Duke
  - NCAA basketball tournament Most Outstanding Player: Diana Taurasi, UConn
  - Basketball Academic All-America Team: Kelly Mazzante, Penn State
  - Carol Eckman Award: Deirdre Kane, West Chester
  - USBWA National Freshman of the Year: Tiffany Jackson, Texas
  - Associated Press College Basketball Coach of the Year: Joe Curl, Houston
  - List of Senior CLASS Award women's basketball winners: Alana Beard, Duke
  - Nancy Lieberman Award: Diana Taurasi, Connecticut
  - Naismith Outstanding Contribution to Basketball: Sonja Hogg

== Deaths ==
- January 9 — Yinka Dare, Nigerian center for the New Jersey Nets (born 1972)
- January 18 — Hook Dillon, All-American at North Carolina (born 1924)
- January 26 — Stanley Nantais, Canadian Olympic player (1936) (born 1913)
- January 28 — Sox Walseth, American college coach (South Dakota State, Colorado) (born 1926)
- April 11 — Hy Gotkin, All-American at St. John's (born 1922)
- July 30 — Ed Melvin, American BAA player and college coach (St. Bonaventure, Toledo) (born 1916)
- July 24 — Cotton Fitzsimmons, NBA basketball coach (born 1931)
- August 12 — George Yardley, Hall of Fame player for the Fort Wayne Pistons (born 1928)
- September 4 — Alphonso Ford, 3000-point NCAA scorer and Greek A1 League MVP (born 1971)
- December 14 — Anselmo López, Spanish coach and administrator. FIBA Hall of Fame member (born 1910)
- December 18 — Eddie Oram, All-American college player (USC), NBL player (born 1914)
- December 25 — Howie Williams, American AAU player and Olympic gold medalist (1952) (born 1927)

== See also ==
- Timeline of women's basketball
