= List of Kennesaw State Owls men's basketball seasons =

The following is a list of Kennesaw State Owls men's basketball seasons. The Owls compete in the Atlantic Sun Conference at the NCAA Division I level. They play their home games at the KSU Convocation Center. Kennesaw State became a Division I member in 2005, and won the Division II national championship in 2004.

== Seasons ==
Conference regular season champion^{†}	Conference tournament champion^{‡}	Postseason bid^{^}	Shared standing

Season	Head coach	Conference	Season results					Tournament results		Final poll	
Season	Head coach	Conference	Overall		Conference			Conference	Postseason	AP	Coaches'
Season	Head coach	Conference	Wins	Losses	Wins	Losses	Finish	Conference	Postseason	AP	Coaches'
Kennesaw State Owls
1985–86	Phil Zenoni	GIAC (NAIA)	7	21	6	12	—	—	—	—	—
1986–87	Phil Zenoni	GIAC (NAIA)	14	16	9	9	—	—	—	—	—
1987–88	Phil Zenoni	GIAC (NAIA)	14	16	8	10	7th	—	—	—	—
1988–89	Phil Zenoni	GIAC (NAIA)	17	14	11	7	—	—	—	—	—
1989–90	Phil Zenoni	GIAC (NAIA)	16	13	9	7	4th	—	—	—	—
1990–91	Phil Zenoni	GIAC (NAIA)	18	11	12	6	—	—	—	—	—
1991–92	Phil Zenoni	GIAC (NAIA)	21	10	11	7	4th	—	—	—	—
1992–93	Phil Zenoni	GIAC (NAIA)	19	12	13	3	—	—	NAIA First Round^{^}	—	—
1993–94	Phil Zenoni	GIAC (NAIA)	20	9	12	3	—	—	—	—	—
1994–95	Phil Zenoni	Peach Belt (NCAA D-II)	8	19	5	13	—	—	—	—	—
1995–96	Phil Zenoni	Peach Belt (NCAA D-II)	12	15	8	10	—	—	—	—	—
1996–97	Greg Yarlett	Peach Belt (NCAA D-II)	20	7	12	6	T-3rd	—	—	—	—
1997–98	Greg Yarlett	Peach Belt (NCAA D-II)	19	10	10	6	6th	—	—	—	—
1998–99	Greg Yarlett	Peach Belt (NCAA D-II)	10	17	4	12	10th	—	—	—	—
1999–2000	Greg Yarlett	Peach Belt (NCAA D-II)	14	11	7	9	T-6th	—	—	—	—
2000–01	Tony Ingle	Peach Belt (NCAA D-II)	11	15	6	10	T-7th	—	—	—	—
2001–02	Tony Ingle	Peach Belt (NCAA D-II)	20	10	13	6	T-3rd	Finals	—	—	—
2002–03	Tony Ingle	Peach Belt (NCAA D-II)	25	10	14	5	2nd	Finals	NCAA Division II Second Round^{^}	—	—
2003–04	Tony Ingle	Peach Belt (NCAA D-II)	35	4	16	0	1st^{†}	Champions^{‡}	NCAA Division II Champions^{^}	—	—
2004–05	Tony Ingle	Peach Belt (NCAA D-II)	24	6	13	3	T-1st^{†}	Semifinals	NCAA Division II First Round^{^}	—	—
2005–06	Tony Ingle	A–Sun (NCAA D-I)	12	17	10	10	7th	—	—	—	—
2006–07	Tony Ingle	A–Sun (NCAA D-I)	13	18	9	9	5th	—	—	—	—
2007–08	Tony Ingle	A–Sun (NCAA D-I)	10	20	7	9	7th	—	—	—	—
2008–09	Tony Ingle	A–Sun (NCAA D-I)	7	23	3	17	11th	—	—	—	—
2009–10	Tony Ingle	A–Sun (NCAA D-I)	13	20	7	13	8th	Semifinals	—	—	—
2010–11	Tony Ingle	A–Sun (NCAA D-I)	8	23	6	14	T-8th	Quarterfinals	—	—	—
2011–12	Lewis Preston	A–Sun (NCAA D-I)	3	28	0	18	10th	—	—	—	—
2012–13	Lewis Preston	A–Sun (NCAA D-I)	3	27	2	16	10th	—	—	—	—
2013–14 (Note: Preston took a leave of absence fifteen games into the 2013–14 season, and Lallathin was named interim head coach for the remainder of the year.)	Lewis Preston; Jimmy Lallathin	A–Sun (NCAA D-I)	6	25	3	15	10th	—	—	—	—
2014–15	Jimmy Lallathin	A–Sun (NCAA D-I)	10	22	4	10	6th	Quarterfinals	—	—	—
2015–16	Al Skinner	A–Sun (NCAA D-I)	11	20	7	7	T-5th	Quarterfinals	—	—	—
2016–17	Al Skinner	A–Sun (NCAA D-I)	14	18	7	7	5th	Semifinals	—	—	—
2017–18	Al Skinner	A–Sun (NCAA D-I)	10	20	6	8	6th	Quarterfinals	—	—	—
2018–19	Al Skinner	A–Sun (NCAA D-I)	6	26	3	13	T-8th	Quarterfinals	—	—	—
2019–20	Amir Abdur-Rahim	A–Sun (NCAA D-I)	1	28	0	16	9th	—	—	—	—
2020–21	Amir Abdur-Rahim	A–Sun (NCAA D-I)	5	19	2	13	9th	Quarterfinals	—	—	—
2021–22	Amir Abdur-Rahim	A–Sun (NCAA D-I)	13	18	7	9	T-4th (East); T-6th (overall)	Quarterfinals	—	—	—
2022–23	Amir Abdur-Rahim	A–Sun (NCAA D-I)	26	9	15	3	T-1st^{†}	Champions^{‡}	NCAA Division I First Round^{^}	—	—
2023–24	Antoine Pettway	A–Sun (NCAA D-I)	15	16	6	10	9th	First round	—	—	—
2024–25	Antoine Pettway	Conference USA (NCAA D-I)	19	14	10	8	T-4th	Semifinals	—	—	—
2025–26	Antoine Pettway	Conference USA (NCAA D-I)	21	14	10	10	T-6th	Champions^{‡}	NCAA Division I First Round^{^}	—	—

== Statistics ==
Statistics correct as of the end of the 2025–26 NCAA Division I men's basketball season

Coaches	Overall			Conference			Postseason		
Coaches	Wins	Losses	Win%	Wins	Losses	Win%	Wins	Losses	Win%
Phil Zenoni	162	156	.509	104	87	.545	0	1	.000
Greg Yarlett	63	45	.583	33	33	.500			
Tony Ingle	179	165	.520	104	96	.520	7	2	.778
Lewis Preston	9	67	.118	2	36	.053			
Jimmy Lallathin	10	22	.313	7	23	.233			
Al Skinner	41	84	.328	23	35	.397			
Amir Abdur-Rahim	45	74	.378	24	41	.369	0	1	.000
Antoine Pettway	55	44	.556	26	28	.481	0	1	.000
All-time record	558	631	.469	330	384	.462	7	5	.583
