= List of Kennesaw State Owls men's basketball head coaches =

The following is a list of Kennesaw State Owls men's basketball head coaches. There have been eight head coaches of the Owls in their 38-season history.

Kennesaw State's current head coach is Antoine Pettway. He was hired as the Owls' head coach in April 2023, replacing Amir Abdur-Rahim, who left to become the head coach at South Florida.

No.	Tenure	Coach	Years	Record	Pct.
1	1985–1996	Phil Zenoni	11	166–156	.516
2	1996–2000	Greg Yarlett	4	63–48	.568
3	2000–2011	Tony Ingle	11	178–165	.519
4	2011–2014 (Note: Preston took a leave of absence on January 2, 2014. Jimmy Lallathin served as interim head coach for the remainder of the 2013–14 season.)	Lewis Preston	3	9–67	.118
5	2014–2015 (Note: After serving as interim head coach for the end of the 2013–14 season, Lallathin was named permanent head coach in March 2014.)	Jimmy Lallathin	2	13–35	.271
6	2015–2019	Al Skinner	4	41–84	.328
7	2019–2023	Amir Abdur-Rahim	4	45–74	.378
8	2023–present	Antoine Pettway	0	0–0	–
Totals		8 coaches	38 seasons	515–626	.451
Records updated through end of 2022–23 season Source
