= Kennesaw State Owls men's basketball statistical leaders =

The Kennesaw State Owls men's basketball statistical leaders are individual statistical leaders of the Kennesaw State Owls men's basketball program in various categories, including points, rebounds, assists, steals, and blocks. Within those areas, the lists identify single-game, single-season, and career leaders. As of the next college basketball season in 2024–25, the Owls represent Kennesaw State University in the NCAA Division I Conference USA.

Kennesaw State began competing in intercollegiate basketball in 1985. These lists are updated through the end of the 2020–21 season.

== Scoring ==
Career
Rank	Player	Points	Seasons
1	Markeith Cummings	2048	2009–10 2010–11 2011–12 2012–13
2	Herman Smith	1683	1986–87 1987–88 1988–89 1989–90
3	Terrell Burden	1657	2019–20 2020–21 2021–22 2022–23 2023–24
4	Ronell Wooten	1633	2004–05 2005–06 2006–07 2007–08
5	Simeon Cottle	1551	2022–23 2023–24 2024–25 2025–26
6	Columbus Ballard	1453	1990–91 1991–92 1992–93 1993–94
7	Tyler Hooker	1414	2016–17 2017–18 2018–19 2019–20
8	Delbert Love	1369	2011–12 2012–13 2013–14 2014–15
9	Yonel Brown	1344	2012–13 2013–14 2014–15 2015–16
10	Darrell Fowler	1333	1985–86 1986–87 1987–88

Season
Rank	Player	Points	Season
1	Kendrick Ray	656	2016–17
2	Herman Smith	652	1988–89
3	Adrian Wooley	619	2024–25
4	Terrence Hill	611	2003–04
5	Simeon Cottle	594	2024–25
6	Tyler Hooker	588	2018–19
7	Kendrick Ray	579	2015–16
8	Yonel Brown	578	2015–16
9	Markeith Cummings	575	2009–10
10	Markeith Cummings	566	2010–11

Single Game
Rank	Player	Points	Season	Opponent
1	Taylor Patterson	55	2003–04	Carver

== Rebounds ==
Career
Rank	Player	Rebounds	Seasons
1	Aaron Anderson	743	2010–11 2011–12 2012–13
2	Israel Brown	734	1989–90 1990–91 1991–92 1992–93
3	Reggie McKoy	707	2002–03 2003–04
4	Georgi Joseph	661	2002–03 2003–04 2004–05
5	Columbus Ballard	638	1990–91 1991–92 1992–93 1993–94
6	Ronell Wooten	615	2004–05 2005–06 2006–07 2007–08
7	Herman Smith	609	1986–87 1987–88 1988–89 1989–90
8	Kenisy Adair	593	1995–96 1996–97
9	Demond Robinson	582	2021–22 2022–23 2023–24
10	Tony Williams	558	1989–90 1990–91 1991–92 1992–93

Season
Rank	Player	Rebounds	Season
1	Reggie McKoy	363	2003–04
2	Aubrey Williams	347	2016–17
3	Reggie McKoy	344	2002–03
4	Kenisy Adair	311	1996–97
5	Frankquon Sherman	297	2025–26
6	Kenisy Adair	282	1995–96
7	Aaron Anderson	280	2011–12
8	Georgi Joseph	276	2004–05
9	Aaron Anderson	270	2012–13
10	Shuan Stegall	258	2006–07

Single Game
Rank	Player	Rebounds	Season	Opponent
1	Reggie McKoy	27	2003–04	Augusta State

== Assists ==
Career
Rank	Player	Assists	Seasons
1	Terrell Burden	570	2019–20 2020–21 2021–22 2022–23 2023–24
2	Golden Ingle	483	2001–02 2005–06 2006–07
3	Daniel Dunlap	467	1992–93 1993–94
4	Tommy Thompson	453	2002–03 2003–04 2004–05
5	Darrell Fowler	441	1985–86 1986–87 1987–88
6	Alex Guilford	411	1988–89 1989–90
7	Spencer Dixon	398	2008–09 2009–10 2010–11 2011–12
8	Delbert Love	326	2011–12 2012–13 2013–14 2014–15
9	Jamie Dockweiler	319	1992–93 1993–94 1994–95 1995–96
10	Ed Womack	295	1999–00 2000–01 2001–02

Season
Rank	Player	Assists	Season
1	Daniel Dunlap	256	1992–93
2	Daniel Dunlap	211	1993–94
3	Alex Guilford	208	1989–90
4	Alex Guilford	203	1988–89
5	Darrell Fowler	195	1985–86
	Terrell Burden	195	2023–24
7	Darrell Fowler	191	1986–87
8	Golden Ingle	180	2006–07
9	Tommy Thompson	167	2004–05
10	Golden Ingle	159	2005–06

Single Game
Rank	Player	Assists	Season	Opponent
1	Alex Guilford	16	1988–89	LaGrange

== Steals ==
Career
Rank	Player	Steals	Seasons
1	Tommy Thompson	206	2002–03 2003–04 2004–05
2	Spencer Dixon	178	2008–09 2009–10 2010–11 2011–12
3	Terrell Burden	168	2019–20 2020–21 2021–22 2022–23 2023–24
4	Delbert Love	166	2011–12 2012–13 2013–14 2014–15
5	Tony Williams	163	1989–90 1990–91 1991–92 1992–93
6	Terrence Hill	162	2002–03 2003–04
7	Ed Womack	149	1999–00 2000–01 2001–02
	Columbus Ballard	149	1990–91 1991–92 1992–93 1993–94
	Israel Brown	149	1989–90 1990–91 1991–92 1992–93
10	Ronell Wooten	142	2004–05 2005–06 2006–07 2007–08

Season
Rank	Player	Steals	Season
1	Terrence Hill	94	2003–04
2	Alex Guilford	78	1989–90
3	Daniel Dunlap	77	1993–94
4	Bobby Brown	76	2002–03
5	Tommy Thompson	70	2002–03
6	Tommy Thompson	69	2003–04
7	Terrence Hill	68	2002–03
8	Tommy Thompson	67	2004–05
9	Ed Womack	63	2001–02
10	Scott Tapp	62	1989–90

Single Game
Rank	Player	Steals	Season	Opponent
1	Daniel Dunlap	11	1993–94	Erskine

== Blocks ==
Career
Rank	Player	Blocks	Seasons
1	Georgi Joseph	114	2002–03 2003–04 2004–05
2	LaDaris Green	106	2009–10 2010–11
3	Jerome Little	99	1996–97 1997–98
4	Braedan Lue	86	2024–25 2025–26
5	Demond Robinson	76	2021–22 2022–23 2023–24
6	Jon-Michael Nickerson	74	2006–07 2007–08 2008–09 2009–10
7	Willy Kouassi	71	2013–14 2014–15
8	Ntumba Ndaye	65	1991–92 1992–93 1993–94 1994–95
	Jordan Jones	65	2014–15 2015–16 2016–17 2017–18
10	Bernard Morena	64	2013–14 2014–15 2015–16

Season
Rank	Player	Blocks	Season
1	Jerome Little	65	1997–98
2	LaDaris Green	54	2010–11
3	LaDaris Green	52	2009–10
4	Braedan Lue	50	2025–26
5	Georgi Joseph	44	2004–05
	Trey Simpson	44	2025–26
7	Georgi Joseph	41	2003–04
8	Nick Patrick	38	1999–00
9	Willy Kouassi	36	2014–15
	Braedan Lue	36	2024–25

Single Game
Rank	Player	Blocks	Season	Opponent
1	Ron Ruffin	7	1994–95	USC Aiken
