= 2003–04 Kennesaw State Owls men's basketball team =

American college basketball season

2003–04 Kennesaw State Owls men's basketball

NCAA Division II National Champions Peach Belt tournament champions Peach Belt regular season champion
- Conference: Peach Belt Conference
- Record: 35–4 (16–0 PBC)
- Head coach: Tony Ingle (4th season)
- Assistant coaches: Stace Tedford; Jeff Jones; Greg Matta; Gary Dyksterhouse
- Home arena: Spec Landrum Center

The 2003–04 Kennesaw State Owls men's basketball team represented Kennesaw State University in the 2003–04 NCAA Division II men's basketball season. The Owls, led by fourth-year head coach Tony Ingle, played their home games at the Spec Landrum Center in Kennesaw, Georgia as members of the Peach Belt Conference.

The Owls finished the season with a 35–4 record, including a 16–0 record in Peach Belt play, to win the regular-season championship. They defeated USC Aiken, Clayton State, and Columbus State to win the Peach Belt tournament, earning the conference's automatic bid to the NCAA Division II tournament. Selected as the No. 1 seed to host the South Atlantic Regional, Kennesaw State defeated Catawba, Columbus State, and Francis Marion to advance to the Elite Eight. The Owls then defeated Pfeiffer and Humboldt State to reach the national championship game, where they defeated Southern Indiana to claim the program's first national championship. The victory marked the first national basketball championship won by a team from Georgia.

The Owls were led by Peach Belt Conference Player of the Year Terrence Hill, who was also named the Peach Belt tournament's Most Valuable Player and the NCAA tournament's Most Outstanding Player.

== Previous season ==
The Owls finished the 2002–03 season 25–10, 14–5 in Peach Belt play. In the Peach Belt tournament, they defeated Georgia College and Augusta before falling to Columbus State in the championship. As an at large bid in the NCAA tournament, the Owls defeated Virginia Union before losing to Bowie State.

== Roster ==
2003–04 Kennesaw State Owls men's basketball team
Players
Coaches

Pos.	#	Name	Height	Weight	Year	Hometown
G	0	Reggie McKoy	6 ft 6 in (1.98 m)	222 lb (101 kg)	Sr	Charlotte, NC
G	3	Tommy Thompson	6 ft 1 in (1.85 m)	180 lb (82 kg)	Jr	Dalton, GA
G	5	Tobias Seldon	6 ft 3 in (1.91 m)	175 lb (79 kg)	Jr	Macon, GA
G	10	Darrell Fisher	6 ft 0 in (1.83 m)	215 lb (98 kg)	Jr	Miami, FL
G	12	Taylor Patterson	6 ft 2 in (1.88 m)	180 lb (82 kg)	Fr	Gardner, KS
G	13	Kevin McDonald	6 ft 7 in (2.01 m)	180 lb (82 kg)	Jr	Charlotte, NC
G	23	Rey Luque	6 ft 5 in (1.96 m)	180 lb (82 kg)	Jr	Miami, FL
G	24	Terrance Hill	6 ft 5 in (1.96 m)	175 lb (79 kg)	Jr	Fort Payne, AL
F/C	30	Will Davis	6 ft 9 in (2.06 m)	195 lb (88 kg)	So	Columbus, GA
F	33	Justin Thompson	6 ft 7 in (2.01 m)	224 lb (102 kg)	Sr	Tampa, FL
F	34	Kenan Knight	6 ft 5 in (1.96 m)	175 lb (79 kg)	So	Kennesaw, GA
G	43	Israel Ingle	5 ft 10 in (1.78 m)	175 lb (79 kg)	So	Orem, UT
F	50	Georgy Joseph	6 ft 6 in (1.98 m)	185 lb (84 kg)	So	Miami, FL
C	54	Cardale Talley	6 ft 7 in (2.01 m)	310 lb (141 kg)	Jr	Clearwater, FL

Head coach

- Tony Ingle (Huntingdon)

Assistant coach(es)

- Stace Tedford (North Alabama)
- Jeff Jones (Pittsburg State)
- Greg Matta (Southern Illinois)
- Gary Dyksterhouse (Wake Forest)

Legend

- (C) Team captain
- (S) Suspended
- (I) Ineligible
- (W) Walk-on
- Injured
- Current redshirt

Roster

== Schedule and results ==
Date time, TV	Rank^{#}	Opponent^{#}	Result	Record	Site (attendance) city, state
Non-conference regular season
November 7, 2003*		vs. Northern Kentucky; Walt Disney Tip-Off Classic	L 65–78	0–1	Disney's Wide World of Sports Complex (279); Orlando, FL
November 8, 2003*		vs. South Dakota State; Walt Disney Tip-Off Classic	L 50–65	0–2	Disney's Wide World of Sports Complex (350); Orlando, FL
November 9, 2003*		vs. Penn; Walt Disney Tip-Off Classic	W 75–60	1–2	Disney's Wide World of Sports Complex; Orlando, FL
November 21, 2003*		at Utah Valley	W 78–43	2–2	McKay Events Center; Orem, UT
November 25, 2003*		at North Alabama	W 63–62	3–2	Flowers Hall (877); Florence, AL
November 28, 2003*		Tusculum	W 89–79	4–2	Spec Landrum Center; Kennesaw, GA
November 29, 2003*		Saint Paul's	W 80–63	5–2	Spec Landrum Center; Kennesaw, GA
December 2, 2003*		at Montevallo	L 60–66	5–3	Myrick Hall (1,025); Montevallo, AL
December 13, 2003*		North Alabama	W 74–51	6–3	Spec Landrum Center (438); Kennesaw, GA
December 15, 2003*		at Carver	W 129–79	7–3	Spec Landrum Center; Kennesaw, GA
December 17, 2003*		at Reinhardt	W 72–68	8–3	Brown Athletic Center; Waleska, GA
December 22, 2003*		Carson–Newman	W 97–67	9–3	Spec Landrum Center (614); Kennesaw, GA
January 2, 2004*		vs. Lenoir–Rhyne	L 71–74	9–4	Cuddy Arena (500); Wingate, NC
January 3, 2004*		at Wingate	W 90–81	10–4	Cuddy Arena (563); Wingate, NC
Peach Belt regular season
January 7, 2004		at Columbus State	W 77–75 ^{OT}	11–4 (1–0)	Frank G. Lumpkin Jr. Center (1,130); Columbus, GA
January 10, 2004		USC Aiken	W 86–68	12–4 (2–0)	Spec Landrum Center (612); Kennesaw, GA
January 14, 2004		Georgia College	W 89–72	13–4 (3–0)	Spec Landrum Center (847); Kennesaw, GA
January 17, 2004		at USC Upstate	W 87–82 ^{OT}	14–4 (4–0)	G. B. Hodge Center (685); Spartanburg, SC
January 21, 2004		Armstrong Atlantic	W 76–61	15–4 (5–0)	Spec Landrum Center (822); Kennesaw, GA
January 24, 2004		Augusta	W 77–45	16–4 (6–0)	Spec Landrum Center (521); Kennesaw, GA
January 28, 2004		at Georgia College	W 84–59	17–4 (7–0)	Centennial Center (678); Milledgeville, GA
January 31, 2004		Francis Marion	W 63–60	18–4 (8–0)	Spec Landrum Center (743); Kennesaw, GA
February 4, 2004		at Armstrong Atlantic	W 65–61	19–4 (9–0)	Alumni Arena (897); Savannah, GA
February 7, 2004		at Lander	W 89–77	20–4 (10–0)	Horne Arena (750); Greenwood, SC
February 11, 2004		at Clayton State	W 59–51	21–4 (11–0)	Mason Barfield Court (1,008); Morrow, GA
February 14, 2004		North Florida	W 66–53	22–4 (12–0)	Spec Landrum Center (681); Kennesaw, GA
February 18, 2004		Columbus State	W 92–72	23–4 (13–0)	Spec Landrum Center (1,037); Kennesaw, GA
February 21, 2004		at UNC Pembroke	W 99–64	24–4 (14–0)	Jones Center; Pembroke, NC
February 25, 2004		Clayton State	W 80–73	25–4 (15–0)	Spec Landrum Center (1,032); Kennesaw, GA
February 28, 2004		at North Florida	W 66–52	26–4 (16–0)	UNF Arena (1,107); Jacksonville, FL
Peach Belt tournament
March 5, 2004	(S1)	vs. (N4) USC Aiken; Quarterfinals	W 96–61	27–4	Christenberry Fieldhouse; Augusta, GA
March 6, 2004	(S1)	vs. (S3) Clayton State; Semifinals	W 43–39	28–4	Christenberry Fieldhouse (722); Augusta, GA
March 7, 2004	(S1)	vs. (S2) Columbus State; Championship	W 72–70	29–4	Christenberry Fieldhouse (731); Augusta, GA
NCAA tournament
March 13, 2004	(1 SA)	(8 SA) Catawba; First round	W 78–63	30–4	Spec Landrum Center (867); Kennesaw, GA
March 14, 2004	(1 SA)	(5 SA) Columbus State; Second round	W 70–55	31–4	Spec Landrum Center (926); Kennesaw, GA
March 16, 2004	(1 SA)	(2 SA) Francis Marion; Sweet Sixteen	W 82–73	32–4	Spec Landrum Center (1,121); Kennesaw, GA
March 24, 2004	(1 SA)	vs. (1 E) Pfeiffer; Elite Eight	W 86–79	33–4	Centennial Garden (1,071); Bakersfield, CA
March 25, 2004	(1 SA)	vs. (3 W) Humboldt State; Final Four	W 81–67	34–4	Centennial Garden (1,354); Bakersfield, CA
March 27, 2004	(1 SA)	vs. (3 GL) Southern Indiana; National Championship	W 84–59	35–4	Centennial Garden (1,610); Bakersfield, CA
*Non-conference game. ^{#}Rankings from AP Poll. (#) Tournament seedings in parentheses. All times are in Eastern.
