= Peach Belt Conference women's basketball tournament =

- Conference basketball championship
- Sport: Basketball
- Conference: Peach Belt Conference
- Number of teams: 8
- Format: Single-elimination tournament
- Played: 1992–present
- Current champion: Augusta (3rd)
- Most championships: Columbus State (5); Lander (5); Georgia College (5); North Georgia (5)
- Official website: PBC women's basketball

The Peach Belt Conference women's basketball tournament is the annual championship tournament for women's basketball in the Peach Belt Conference. It has been held annually since 1992 and is a single-elimination tournament, with seeding based on regular season records.

The winner receives the conference's automatic bid to the NCAA Women's Division II Basketball Championship.

== Results ==
Year	Champions	Score	Runner-up	Venue
1992	Augusta State	64–46	Georgia College	Christenberry Fieldhouse (Augusta, GA)
1993	Augusta State	69–60	USC Spartanburg	Christenberry Fieldhouse (Augusta, GA)
1994	USC Spartanburg	61–60	Columbus State	Christenberry Fieldhouse (Augusta, GA)
1995	USC Spartanburg	69–49	Armstrong State	Christenberry Fieldhouse (Augusta, GA)
1996	Georgia College	55–52	Kennesaw State	Centennial Center (Milledgeville, GA)
1997	Kennesaw State	78–77	Georgia College	Centennial Center (Milledgeville, GA)
1998	Francis Marion	71–67	Columbus State	Alumni Arena (Savannah, GA)
1999	Lander	73–69	Columbus State	Alumni Arena (Savannah, GA)
2000	Columbus State	83–68	Lander	Finis Horne Arena (Greenwood, SC)
2001	Columbus State	56–38	USC Aiken	Finis Horne Arena (Greenwood, SC)
2002	Georgia College	68–66	North Florida	Frank G. Lumpkin Center (Columbus, GA)
2003	Armstrong Atlantic State	56–55	Columbus State	Frank G. Lumpkin Center (Columbus, GA)
2004	Georgia College	79–67	Lander	Christenberry Fieldhouse (Augusta, GA)
2005	Clayton State	83–76 (OT)	Columbus State	Christenberry Fieldhouse (Augusta, GA)
2006	Georgia College	89–83 (2OT)	Francis Marion	Finis Horne Arena (Greenwood, SC)
2007	Clayton State	50–43	Columbus State	Finis Horne Arena (Greenwood, SC)
2008	Lander	68–65	Armstrong Atlantic State	Convocation Center (Aiken, SC)
2009	Lander	64–53	USC Aiken	Convocation Center (Aiken, SC)
2010	Clayton State	95–74	Francis Marion	Convocation Center (Aiken, SC)
2011	Georgia College	62–49	USC Aiken	Convocation Center (Aiken, SC)
2012	USC Aiken	52–47	Clayton State	Frank G. Lumpkin Center (Columbus, GA)
2013	Clayton State	81–54	North Georgia	Frank G. Lumpkin Center (Columbus, GA)
2014	Columbus State	60–49	Georgia College	Frank G. Lumpkin Center (Columbus, GA)
2015	Columbus State	63–51	Georgia College	English E. Jones Center (Pembroke, NC)
2016	Lander	72–68	Columbus State	Frank G. Lumpkin Center (Columbus, GA)
2017	Columbus State	76–61	Lander	Finis Horne Arena (Greenwood, SC)
2018	North Georgia	76–70	Lander	UNG Convocation Center (Dahlonega, GA)
2019	North Georgia	90–72	Columbus State	Christenberry Fieldhouse (Augusta, GA)
2020	Lander	76–62	North Georgia	Finis Horne Arena (Greenwood, SC)
2021	North Georgia	72–70	Lander	Finis Horne Arena (Greenwood, SC)
2022	North Georgia	72–65	Clayton State	UNG Convocation Center (Dahlonega, GA)
2023	Georgia Southwestern	83–64	Young Harris	Storm Dome (Americus, GA)
2024	Georgia Southwestern	57–52	Columbus State	Storm Dome (Americus, GA)
2025	North Georgia	81–72	Georgia Southwestern	UNG Convocation Center (Dahlonega, GA)
2026	Augusta	61–56	Georgia College	Frank G. Lumpkin Center (Columbus, GA)

== Championship records ==
School	Finals Record	Finals Appearances	Years
Columbus State	5–9	14	2000, 2001, 2014, 2015, 2017
Georgia College	5–5	10	1996, 2002, 2004, 2006, 2011
Lander	5–5	10	1999, 2008, 2009, 2016, 2020
North Georgia	5–2	7	2018, 2019, 2021, 2022, 2025
Clayton State	4–2	6	2006, 2007, 2010, 2013
Augusta (Augusta State, Georgia Regents)	3–0	3	1992, 1993, 2026
USC Upstate (USC Spartanburg)	2–1	3	1994, 1995
Georgia Southwestern	2–1	3	2023, 2024
USC Aiken	1–3	4	2012
Armstrong State (Armstrong Atlantic State)	1–2	3	2003
Francis Marion	1–2	3	1998
Kennesaw State	1–1	2	1997
North Florida	0–1	1	
Young Harris	0–1	1	

- Flagler and USC Beaufort have not yet reached the finals of the Peach Belt tournament.
- Montevallo and UNC Pembroke never reached the finals of the Peach Belt tournament before leaving the conference.
- Schools highlighted in pink are former members of the Peach Belt Conference

== See also ==
- Peach Belt Conference men's basketball tournament
