= Houston Baptist Huskies basketball =

Houston Baptist Huskies basketball may refer to either of the basketball teams that represent Houston Baptist University:

- Houston Baptist Huskies men's basketball
- Houston Baptist Huskies women's basketball
