= Peach Belt Conference men's basketball tournament =

- Conference basketball championship
- Sport: Basketball
- Conference: Peach Belt Conference
- Number of teams: 8
- Format: Single-elimination tournament
- Played: 1992–present
- Current champion: Lander (6th)
- Most championships: Augusta (7)
- Official website: PBC men's basketball

Host locations
- Augusta, GA (1992–95, 2004–05, 2022-2023); Milledgeville, GA (1996–97); Savannah, GA (1998–99); Greenwood, SC (2000–01, 2006–07, 2017–2020, 2026); Columbus, GA (2002–03, 2012–14, 2016, 2025); Aiken, SC (2008–11, 2024); Pembroke, NC (2015); Saint Augustine, FL (2021)

The Peach Belt Conference men's basketball tournament is the annual conference basketball championship tournament for the Peach Belt Conference. The tournament has been held annually since 1992. It is a single-elimination tournament and seeding is based on regular season records.

The winner receives the conference's automatic bid to the NCAA Men's Division II Basketball Championship.

== Results ==
Year	Champions	Score	Runner-up	Most Valuable Player	Venue
1992	Columbus State	86–76	USC Spartanburg	Tyrone Avery, Columbus State	Augusta, GA
1993	USC Aiken	64–60	Augusta State	Steve Franklin, USC Aiken & Derek Stewart, Augusta State	Augusta, GA
1994	Lander	76–74	Columbus State	Bill Hanford, Lander	Augusta, GA
1995	Lander	77–56	Columbus State	Larry Person, Lander	Augusta, GA
1996	Columbus State	95–83	USC Spartanburg	Isaac Camon, Columbus State	Milledgeville, GA
1997	Georgia College	69–65	USC Spartanburg	Quinton Matthews, Georgia College	Milledgeville, GA
1998	Columbus State	74–60	Armstrong Atlantic State	Calvin Hill, Columbus State	Savannah, GA
1999	Georgia College	70–64	Augusta State	Derrick Nicholson, Georgia College	Savannah, GA
2000	Columbus State	95–67	Armstrong Atlantic State	Travis Crutcher, Columbus State	Greenwood, SC
2001	Augusta State	60–46	Armstrong Atlantic State	Gary Boodnikoff, Augusta State	Greenwood, SC
2002	Augusta State	79–67	Kennesaw State	Gary Boodnikoff, Augusta State	Columbus, GA
2003	Columbus State	72–56	Kennesaw State	Jed Bedford, Columbus State	Columbus, GA
2004	Kennesaw State	72–70	Columbus State	Terrence Hill, Kennesaw State	Augusta, GA
2005	Columbus State	93–81	USC Upstate	Yandel Brown, Columbus State	Augusta, GA
2006	USC Upstate	73–49	Armstrong Atlantic State	Daniel Quinlan, USC Upstate	Greenwood, SC
2007	Lander	75–61	Clayton State	Michael Griffin, Lander	Greenwood, SC
2008	Clayton State	89–87^{3OT}	USC Aiken	Tracy Williams, Clayton State	Aiken, SC
2009	Augusta State	65–64	USC Aiken	Ben Madgen, Augusta State	Aiken, SC
2010	USC Aiken	65–60	Montevallo	Byron Faison, USC Aiken	Aiken, SC
2011	Augusta State	76–59	UNC Pembroke	George Johnson, Augusta State	Aiken, SC
2012	Montevallo	70–57	Columbus State	Antoine Davis, Montevello	Columbus, GA
2013	USC Aiken	65–60	Montevallo	Re'Mon Nelson, USC Aiken	Columbus, GA
2014	USC Aiken	61–59	Montevallo	DeVontae Wright, USC Aiken	Columbus, GA
2015	Montevallo	80–76^{OT}	Columbus State	Larry Slaughter, Montevello	Pembroke, NC
2016	Lander	87–86	Augusta	J. R. Washington, Lander	Columbus, GA
2017	UNC Pembroke	89–77	Columbus State	Akia Pruitt, UNC Pembroke	Greenwood, SC
2018	UNC Pembroke	70–60	Clayton State	Nigel Grant, UNC Pembroke	Morrow, GA
2019	Augusta	93-86	USC Aiken	Deane Williams, Augusta	Augusta, GA
2020	Lander	76-73	Columbus State	Tyler Brevard, Lander	Greenwood, SC
2021	Flagler	73–60	Georgia Southwestern	Jaizec Lottie, Flagler	Saint Augustine, FL
2022	Augusta	82–71	Flagler	Tyshaun Crawford, Augusta	Saint Augustine, FL
2023	Augusta	86–72	Lander	Tyshaun Crawford, Augusta	Augusta, GA
2024	North Georgia	70–60	Flagler	Frank Champion, North Georgia	Aiken, SC
2025	USC Aiken	92–76	USC Beaufort	Jalen McCoy, USC Aiken	Columbus, GA
2026	Lander	64–54	North Georgia	Jacob Daniels, Lander	Greenwood, SC

== Championship records ==
School	Championships	Years
Augusta	7	2001, 2002, 2009, 2011, 2019, 2022, 2023
Lander	6	1994, 1995, 2007, 2016, 2020, 2026
Columbus State	6	1992, 1996, 1998, 2000, 2003, 2005
USC Aiken	5	1993, 2010, 2013, 2014, 2025
Georgia College	2	1997, 1999
Montevallo	2	2012, 2015
UNC Pembroke	2	2017, 2018
Clayton State	1	2008
Flagler	1	2021
North Georgia	1	2024
Kennesaw State	1	2004
USC Upstate	1	2006

- Georgia Southwestern and USC Beaufort have not yet won the Peach Belt tournament.
- Francis Marion, North Florida, and Young Harris never won the tournament as Peach Belt members.
- Schools highlighted in pink are former members of the Peach Belt Conference

== See also ==
- Peach Belt Conference women's basketball tournament
