= Georgi Joseph =

French basketball player

LDLC ASVEL
- Title: Player development assistant
- League: LNB Élite; EuroLeague

Personal information
- Born: 23 November 1982 (age 43) Paris, France
- Listed height: 6 ft 6 in (1.98 m)

Career information
- College: Kennesaw State (2002–2005)
- NBA draft: 2005: undrafted
- Playing career: 2005–2023
- Position: Forward

Career history
- 2005–2006: Agricola Gloria Montecatini
- 2006–2007: Paris Basket Racing
- 2007–2008: Clermont
- 2008–2009: Aix Maurienne
- 2009–2011: Pau-Orthez
- 2011–2012: Orléans
- 2012–2015: ASVEL
- 2015–2016: JL Bourg-en-Bresse
- 2016–2017: Orléans
- 2017–2019: AS Monaco
- 2019–2020: Levallois Metropolitans
- 2020–2021: ESSM Le Portel
- 2021: SIG Strasbourg
- 2021–2022: Tours Métropole Basket
- 2022–2023: Aix Maurienne Savoie

Career highlights
- Leaders Cup winner (2018)

Georgi Joseph (born 23 November 1982) is a French professional former basketball player who is currently the player development assistant for LDLC ASVEL of the French LNB Élite and the EuroLeague.

Joseph spent the 2019–20 season with the Levallois Metropolitans, averaging 3.2 points and 2.8 rebounds per game. He signed with ESSM Le Portel on 23 September 2020. In 2021, Joseph joined Tours Métropole Basket and averaged 5.4 points, 5.4 rebounds, and 1.9 assists per game. On 3 March 2022, he signed with Aix Maurienne.

== Personal life ==
Joseph is of Haitian descent.
