= Janiel Simon =

Antiguan footballer (born 1981)

Personal information
- Full name: Janiel Simon
- Date of birth: 11 June 1981 (age 45)
- Place of birth: St Mary, Antigua and Barbuda
- Height: 6 ft 1 in (1.85 m)
- Position: Goalkeeper

Youth career
- 1999–2001: SAP
- 2001–2002: Bryant & Stratton Bobcats
- 2003: USC Upstate Spartans
- 2007: Clayton State Lakers

Senior career*
Years	Team	Apps	(Gls)
2004–2007	SAP		
2008–2013	Empire		
2013	Antigua Barracdua	2	(0)

International career^{‡}
2000–2008	Antigua and Barbuda	15	(0)
- * Club domestic league appearances and goals as of 31 December 2008 ‡ National team caps and goals as of 31 December 2008

Janiel Simon (born June 11, 1981) is an Antiguan footballer.

Janiel works for the Environmental division of the Antigua and Barbuda Government. He also was instrumental in organising a friendly match between a SAP F.C. side and a touring team of Explorer Scouts from the UK. The final score was: SAP F.C. 7- 5 Gladiator, ESU football team. Janiel played most of the match, despite an eye injury, in defence rather than in goal.

== College career ==
Simon played for both the USC Upstate Spartans and the Clayton State Lakers in soccer and track and field. He played 15 games for the Spartans in 2003 and 14 games for the Lakers in 2007.

== International career ==
Nicknamed Board, Simon made his debut for Antigua and Barbuda in an April 2000 FIFA World Cup qualification match against Bermuda and has earned over 20 caps since. He played in 8 FIFA World Cup qualification games.

== National team statistics ==
Antigua and Barbuda national team
Year	Apps	Goals
2000	6	0
2001	0	0
2002	2	0
2003	2	0
2004	1	0
2005	0	0
2006	0	0
2007	0	0
2008	3	0
Total	14	0
