= Corentin Carne =

French basketball player (born 1996)

No. 22 – AMSB
- Position: Shooting guard
- League: LNB Pro B

Personal information
- Born: June 18, 1996 (age 29) Lens, France
- Listed height: 1.95 m (6 ft 5 in)

Career information
- Playing career: 2014–present

Career history
- 2014–2017: Élan Béarnais Pau-Lacq-Orthez
- 2017–2018: Charleville-Mézières
- 2018–2019: Nanterre 92
- 2019–2022: Antibes Sharks
- 2022–present: Aix Maurienne Savoie Basket

Corentin Carne (born June 18, 1996) is a French professional basketball player for Aix Maurienne Savoie Basket of the LNB Pro B in France. He plays as a shooting guard.
