= Aaron Anderson (basketball) =

American basketball player (born 1991)

Personal information
- Born: June 10, 1991 (age 35) Tucson, Arizona
- Listed height: 6 ft 7 in (2.01 m)
- Listed weight: 220 lb (100 kg)

Career information
- High school: Mountain View (Marana, Arizona)
- College: Central Arizona (2009–2010); Kennesaw State (2010–2013)
- NBA draft: 2013: undrafted
- Playing career: 2013–present
- Position: Forward

Career history
- 2013–2014: CAB Madeira
- 2014–2016, 2017–2018: Södertälje Kings

Career highlights
- 2× Swedish champion (2015, 2016); LPB reabounding leader (2014)

Aaron Drake Anderson (born June 10, 1991) is an American professional basketball player who last played for the Södertälje Kings of the Swedish Basketligan. He won the Swedish championship with the Kings in 2015 and 2016. Anderson led the Liga Portuguesa de Basquetebol in rebounds during the 2013–2014 season.

== College ==
Anderson played at Kennesaw State University in Kennesaw, Georgia, during his collegiate career and left as the schools all-time leader in rebounds.

== Playing career ==
Anderson had a workout with the Phoenix Suns in 2013 but ended up going undrafted in the 2013 NBA draft.

In September 2013, Anderson signed with CAB Madeira of the Liga Portuguesa de Basquetebol. For the 2013–2014 season, he averaged 12.5 points and league leading 12.2 rebounds and was named to the All-League second-team and to the All-Import team.

Anderson signed with Czech club Sluneta Ústí nad Labem in August 2014 but was released shortly later. A month later, he signed with reigning Swedish champions Södertälje Kings of the Basketligan. On April 21, 2015, Anderson was accused of racist remarks by Uppsala Basket's Brice Massamba. The leagues disciplinary board did not find any evidence of the accusations and thus did not hand out any penalties. He won the Swedish championship with the Kings in 2015 and 2016.
