= Aix Maurienne Savoie Basket =

- Leagues: Élite 2
- Founded: 1969; 57 years ago
- Arena: Halle Marlioz
- Capacity: 1,500
- Location: Aix-les-Bains, Savoie, France
Home	Away

Aix Maurienne Savoie Basket, commonly known as AMSB, is a French basketball club based in Aix-les-Bains, Savoie. The team plays in the Élite 2, the second division of France. Their home arena is the Halle Marlioz.

== Season by season ==
Season	Tier	League	Pos.	French Cup	Other competitions
2011–12	2	Pro B	4th		
2012–13	2	Pro B	10th		
2013–14	2	Pro B	8th		
2014–15	2	Pro B	17th		
2015–16	3	NM1	2nd		
2016–17	2	Pro B	16th		
2017-18		Pro B	11th		
2018-19		Pro B	14th		

== Notable players ==
- Set a club record or won an individual award as a professional player.
- Played at least one official international match for his senior national team at any time.

- (Ivory Coast) Tiegbe Bamba
- (Cameroon) Joachim Ekanga-Ehawa
- (Finland) Henri Kantonen
- (Finland) Ilari Seppälä
- (Switzerland) David Ramseyer

== Current roster ==
Note: Flags indicate national team eligibility at FIBA-sanctioned events. Players may hold other non-FIBA nationalities not displayed.

Aix Maurienne Savoie Basket roster
Players
Coaches

Pos.	No.	Nat.	Name	Ht.	Age
G	0	(United States)	Jackson, K. J.	1.88 m (6 ft 2 in)	28 – 27 March 1998
SG	3	(United States)	Willett, Shaun	1.93 m (6 ft 4 in)	29 – 15 November 1996
SG	5	(Ivory Coast)	Zouzoua, Nisre	1.88 m (6 ft 2 in)	30 – 16 July 1996
G	7	(France)	Durand, Jules	1.86 m (6 ft 1 in)	21 – 1 May 2005
SF	8	(France)	Hippolyte, Calvin	1.97 m (6 ft 6 in)	26 – 15 January 2000
G	10	(France)	Gaultier, Tiam	1.94 m (6 ft 4 in)	23 – 14 October 2003
PF	11	(Dominican Republic)	García, Juan Jose	2.01 m (6 ft 7 in)	37 – 22 April 1989
F	12	(France)	Joseph, Georgi	1.99 m (6 ft 6 in)	43 – 23 November 1982
SG	13	(France)	Falcoz, Corentin	1.92 m (6 ft 4 in)	24 – 5 November 2002
F	14	(Suriname)	Kensmil, Gavin	2.01 m (6 ft 7 in)	27 – 29 December 1998
C	16	(France)	Eyango-Dingo, Samuel	2.06 m (6 ft 9 in)	25 – 16 May 2001
F/C	17	(Switzerland)	Ramseyer, David	2.02 m (6 ft 8 in)	39 – 11 January 1987
SG	22	(France)	Carne, Corentin	1.95 m (6 ft 5 in)	30 – 18 June 1996
SF	26	(France)	Hergott, Lucas	2.00 m (6 ft 7 in)	28 – 26 December 1997

Head coach

- (France) Emmanuel Schmitt

Assistant coach(es)

- (France) Julien Cros

Legend

- (C) Team captain
- Injured

- Roster
Updated: April 12, 2023

=== Depth chart ===
Pos.	Starting 5	Bench 1	Bench 2
C	David Ramseyer	Samuel Eyango-Dingo
PF	Gavin Kensmil	Georgi Joseph	Juan Jose García
SF	Lucas Hergott	Calvin Hippolyte
SG	Shaun Willett	Corentin Carne	Tiam Gaultier
PG	K. J. Jackson	Corentin Falcoz	Jules Durand
