= 2004 NCAA Division II women's basketball tournament =

American sporting competition

- Teams: 64
- Finals site: St. Joseph Civic Arena, St. Joseph, Missouri
- Champions: California Vulcans (1st title)
- Runner-up: Drury Panthers (1st title game)
- Semifinalists: Henderson State Reddies (1st Final Four); Merrimack Warriors (1st Final Four)
- Winning coach: Darcie Vincent (1st title)
- MOP: Megan Storck (California (PA))

The 2004 NCAA Division II women's basketball tournament was the 23rd annual tournament hosted by the NCAA to determine the national champion of Division II women's collegiate basketball in the United States.

California (PA) defeated Drury in the championship game, 75–72, to claim the Vulcans' first NCAA Division II national title.

As in 2003, the championship rounds were contested at the St. Joseph Civic Arena in St. Joseph, Missouri.

Ten teams made their first appearance in the NCAA Division II tournament: Anderson (SC), Ashland, Barton, Benedict, Christian Brothers, Fort Lewis, Holy Family, UC San Diego, USciences, and West Virginia State.

== Regionals ==
=== East - California, Pennsylvania ===
Location: Hamer Hall Host: California University of Pennsylvania

First round Round of 64; March 12
1	California (PA)	78
8	Charleston (WV)	57
5	Barton	83
4	Pitt Johnstown	71
6	Anderson (SC)	88
3	West Liberty State	78
2	Glenville State	74
7	West Virginia State	64

Regional semifinals Round of 32; March 13
1	California (PA)	92
5	Barton	58
6	Anderson (SC)	71
2	Glenville State	72

Regional finals Sweet Sixteen; March 15
1	California (PA)	74
2	Glenville State	63

=== Great Lakes - Quincy, Illinois ===
Location: Pepsi Arena Host: Quincy University

First round Round of 64; March 12
8	Northern Kentucky	49
1	Quincy (IL)	51
5	Bellarmine	67
4	Indianapolis	79
6	Ashland	82
3	Ferris State	69
2	Lake Superior State	100
7	Southern Indiana	86

Regional semifinals Round of 32; March 13
1	Quincy (IL)	72
4	Indianapolis	59
6	Ashland	82
2	Lake Superior State	95

Regional finals Sweet Sixteen; March 15
1	Quincy (IL)	66
2	Lake Superior State	49

=== North Central - St. Paul, Minnesota ===
Location: Gangelhoff Center Host: Concordia University, St. Paul

First round Round of 64; March 12
1	Concordia–St. Paul	73
8	Minnesota Duluth	54
5	Nebraska–Kearney	56
4	South Dakota State	67
3	North Dakota State	70
6	South Dakota	63
7	Fort Lewis	51
2	North Dakota	53

Regional semifinals Round of 32; March 13
1	Concordia–St. Paul	39
4	South Dakota State	74
3	North Dakota State	65
2	North Dakota	66

Regional finals Sweet Sixteen; March 15
4	South Dakota State	72*
2	North Dakota	70

=== Northeast - North Andover, Massachusetts ===
Location: Volpe Complex Host: Merrimack College

First round Round of 64; March 12
8	Adelphi	67
1	Merrimack	92
4	American International	81
5	USciences	71
3	Holy Family	55
6	Stonehill	57
2	Bentley	65
7	Bryant	70

Regional semifinals Round of 32; March 13
1	Merrimack	91
4	American International	57
6	Stonehill	58
7	Bryant	70

Regional finals Sweet Sixteen; March 15
1	Merrimack	70
7	Bryant	57

=== South - Winter Park, Florida ===
Location: Warden Arena at Harold & Ted Alfond Sports Center Host: Rollins College

First round Round of 64; March 12
8	Benedict	42
1	Rollins	51
4	Christian Brothers	77
5	West Alabama	79*
6	Central Arkansas	77
3	Fort Valley State	79
2	Delta State	54
7	Henderson State	55

Regional semifinals Round of 32; March 13
1	Rollins	63
5	West Alabama	45
3	Fort Valley State	42
7	Henderson State	60

Regional finals Sweet Sixteen; March 15
1	Rollins	62
7	Henderson State	73

=== South Atlantic - Raleigh, North Carolina ===
Location: Spaulding Gym Host: Shaw University

First round Round of 64; March 12
8	Augusta State	81
1	Shaw	54
5	Armstrong Atlantic State	75
4	North Florida	58
3	Lander	66
6	Virginia Union	68
7	Catawba	60
2	Georgia College	65

Regional semifinals Round of 32; March 13
8	Augusta State	79
5	Armstrong Atlantic State	74
6	Virginia Union	61
2	Georgia College	71

Regional finals Sweet Sixteen; March 15
8	Augusta State	91
2	Georgia College	68

=== South Central - Springfield, Missouri ===
Location: Weiser Gymnasium Host: Drury University

First round Round of 64; March 12
1	Drury	74
8	Missouri Western State	57
4	NW Missouri State	64
5	Washburn	65
3	Emporia State	54
6	West Texas A&M	60
2	Angelo State	65
7	Northeastern State	73

Regional semifinals Round of 32; March 13
1	Drury	67
5	Washburn	55
6	West Texas A&M	71
7	Northeastern State	79*

Regional finals Sweet Sixteen; March 15
1	Drury	81
7	Northeastern State	63

=== West - Seattle, Washington ===
Location: Royal Brougham Pavilion Host: Seattle Pacific University

First round Round of 64; March 12
8	UC San Diego	59
1	Seattle Pacific	79
5	Sonoma State	71
4	Western Washington	85
3	Cal Poly Pomona	74
6	Chico State	70
2	Cal State Bakersfield	86
7	Grand Canyon	61

Regional semifinals Round of 32; March 13
1	Seattle Pacific	80
4	Western Washington	66
3	Cal Poly Pomona	87
2	Cal State Bakersfield	84

Regional finals Sweet Sixteen; March 15
1	Seattle Pacific	80
3	Cal Poly Pomona	63

== Elite Eight - St. Joseph, Missouri ==
Location: St. Joseph Civic Arena Host: Missouri Western State College

National quarterfinals Elite Eight; March 24
S	Henderson State	61
GL	Quincy (IL)	60
SC	Drury	94
W	Seattle Pacific	83
NE	Merrimack	76
SA	Augusta State	68
E	California (PA)	96
NC	South Dakota State	79

National semifinals Final Four; March 25
S	Henderson State	70
SC	Drury	82
NE	Merrimack	65
E	California (PA)	89

National championship March 27
SC	Drury	72
E	California (PA)	75

== All-tournament team ==
- Megan Storck, California (PA)
- Sara McKinney, California (PA)
- Jill Curry, Drury
- Amanda Newton, Drury
- Kara Rutledge, Drury

== See also ==
- 2004 NCAA Division I women's basketball tournament
- 2004 NCAA Division III women's basketball tournament
- 2004 NAIA Division I women's basketball tournament
- 2004 NAIA Division II women's basketball tournament
- 2004 NCAA Division II men's basketball tournament
