= Houston Christian Huskies women's basketball =

2025–26 Houston Christian Huskies women's basketball team
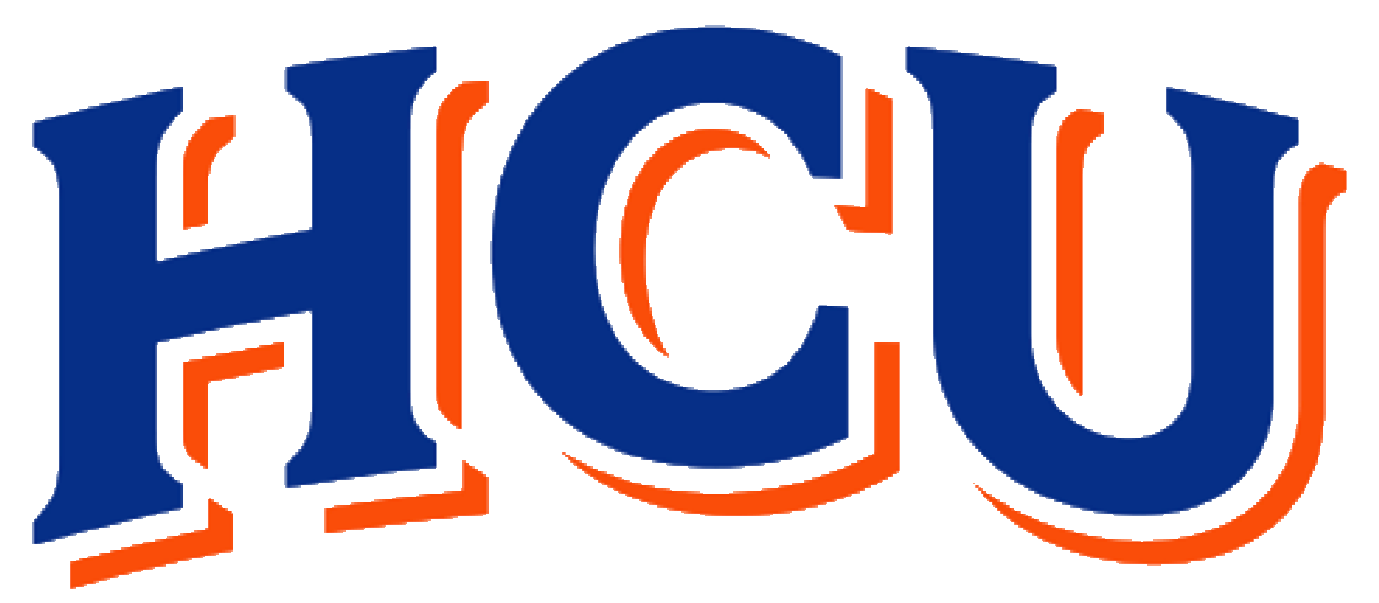
- University: Houston Christian University
- Head coach: Drew Long (2nd season)
- Location: Houston, Texas
- Arena: Sharp Gymnasium (capacity: 1,000)
- Conference: Southland
- Nickname: Huskies
- Colors: Royal blue and orange

Conference regular-season champions
- 2022

Uniforms
Home	Away

The Houston Christian Huskies women's basketball team, known as the Houston Baptist Huskies until 2022, is the women's basketball team that represents Houston Christian University in Houston, Texas. The team currently competes in the Southland Conference. The Huskies are led by head coach Drew Long.

== History ==
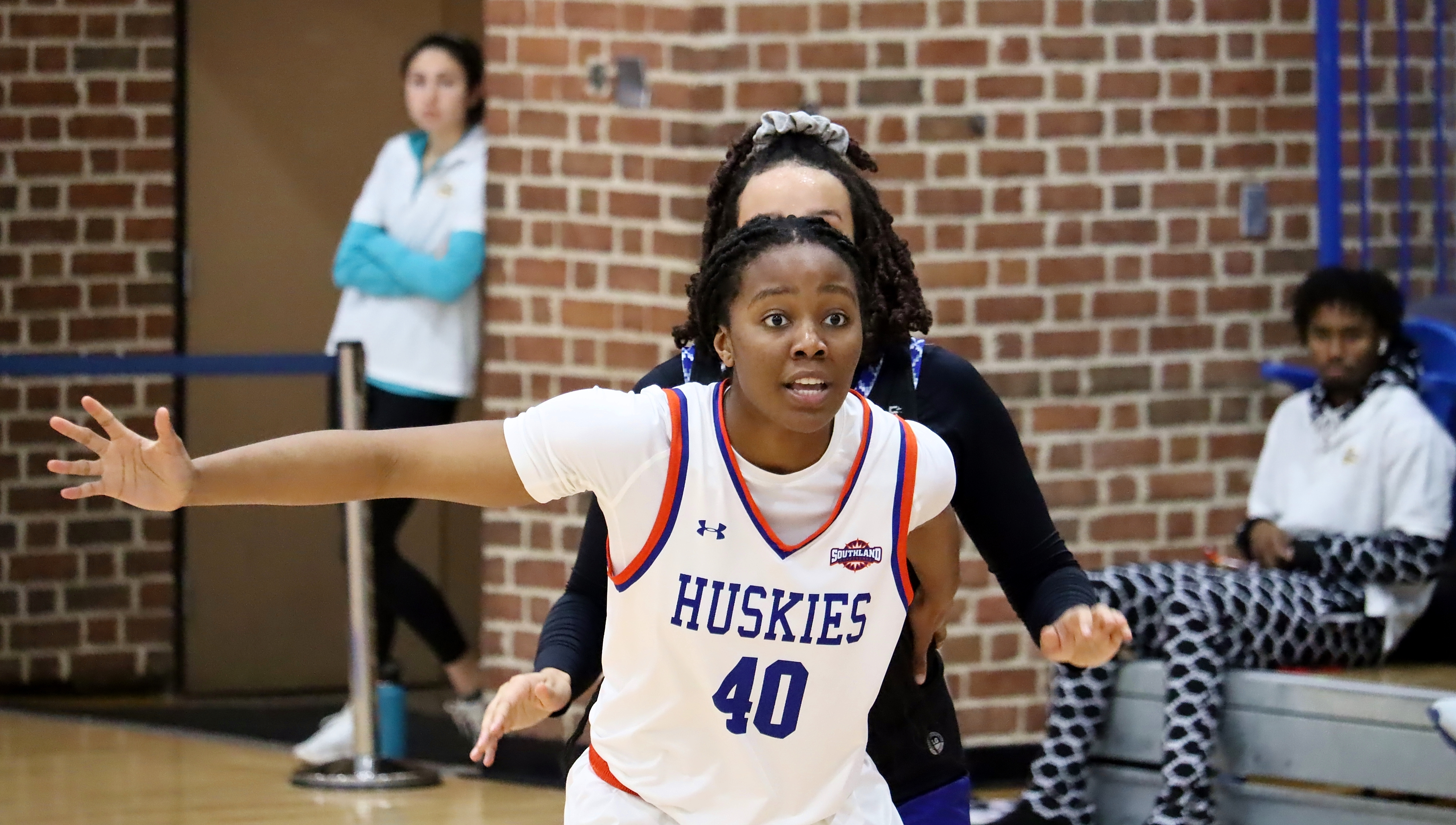
A Huskies women's basketball game at Sharp Gymnasium in 2024

The Huskies have played women's basketball since 1999. In 2022, HBU clinched its regular season title, the first in program history, and the first outright Southland conference title in any sport in school history.

== Postseason results ==
=== WNIT results ===
The Huskies have appeared in the Women's National Invitation Tournament (WNIT) once. Their combined record is 0–1.

Year	Round	Opponent	Result
2022	First Round	Toledo	L, 51–61

=== NAIA Division I ===
The Huskies made eight appearances in the NAIA Division I women's basketball tournament, with a combined record of 14–8.

Year	Seed	Round	Opponent	Result
2000	NR	First Round	#8 Campbellsville	L, 55–64
2001	NR	First Round; Second Round; Quarterfinals	#13 Oklahoma Christian; Dillard #5 Lewis–Clark State	W, 70–68 (OT); W, 72–66; L, 82–84
2002	#6	First Round; Second Round; Quarterfinals	Auburn Montgomery #11 Oklahoma Baptist #3 Union (TN)	W, 67–59; W, 83–80; L, 50–71
2003	#1	First Round; Second Round	#8 Claflin #5 Point Loma Nazarene	W, 83–63; L, 68–75
2004	#2	First Round; Second Round; Quarterfinals; Semifinals	#7 Montana Western #3 Columbia (MO) #1 Freed–Hardeman #1 Oklahoma City	W, 89–79; W, 79–66; W, 74–61; L, 69–81
2005	#1	First Round; Second Round; Quarterfinals; Semifinals	#8 IU South Bend #5 Cumberland (TN) #3 Georgetown (KY) #1 Oklahoma City	W, 64–49; W, 86–59; W, 68–66; L, 74–81
2006	#2	First Round; Second Round	#7 Lindsey Wilson #6 Lubbock Christian	W, 60–57; L, 56–62
2007	#6	First Round; Second Round; Quarterfinals	#3 Montana Western #2 Lubbock Christian #1 Union (TN)	W, 64–63; W, 82–73; L, 58–83

== Roster ==
2023–24 Houston Christian Huskies women's basketball team
Players
Coaches

Pos.	#	Name	Height	Year	Hometown
G	0	Enya Maguire	5 ft 4 in (1.63 m)	Jr	Belfast, Northern Ireland
G	3	Erin Maguire	5 ft 7 in (1.7 m)	RS Fr	Belfast, Northern Ireland
G	5	Kennedy Wilson	5 ft 6 in (1.68 m)	Sr	Mansfield, Texas
G	10	Hannah Fields	5 ft 10 in (1.78 m)	Fr	Oklahoma City, Oklahoma
F	11	Joy Oly	6 ft 0 in (1.83 m)	So	Ettelbruck, Luxembourg
F	12	Amy Cotton	6 ft 0 in (1.83 m)	Jr	North Adelaide, Australia
G	13	Tove Caesar	6 ft 1 in (1.85 m)	Fr	Stockholm, Sweden
F	14	N'Denasija Collins	6 ft 0 in (1.83 m)	Sr	Mansfield, Texas
G	22	Makolla Bagayegou	5 ft 9 in (1.75 m)	Fr	Gothenburg, Sweden
G	23	Lyric Barr	6 ft 1 in (1.85 m)	Fr	Houston, Texas
G	24	Cat Hursh	5 ft 9 in (1.75 m)	Sr	Katy, Texas
C	25	Yasmin Butler	6 ft 5 in (1.96 m)	So	Wollongong, Australia
F	33	Riley Wells	6 ft 2 in (1.88 m)	Fr	Montgomery, Ohio
C	40	Elizabeth Matadi	6 ft 5 in (1.96 m)	Jr	Irving, Texas

Head coach

- Donna Finnie (Lamar)

Assistant coach(es)

- Taylor Reed (Louisiana Tech)
- Grace Daniels (Texas–San Antonio)
- Julija Vujakovic

Legend

- (C) Team captain
- (S) Suspended
- (I) Ineligible
- (W) Walk-on
- Injured
- Current redshirt

Roster
Last update: October 25, 2023
