= 2004 NCAA Division III men's basketball tournament =

American collegiate men's basketball tournament (2004)

- Teams: 48
- Finals site: , Salem, Virginia
- Champions: Wisconsin–Stevens Point (1st title)
- Runner-up: Williams (2nd title game)
- Semifinalists: John Carroll (1st Final Four); Amherst (1st Final Four)
- Winning coach: Jack Bennett (UWSP)
- MOP: Nick Bennett (UWSP)
- Attendance: 52,066

The 2004 NCAA Division III men's basketball tournament was the 30th annual single-elimination tournament to determine the national champions of National Collegiate Athletic Association (NCAA) men's Division III collegiate basketball in the United States.

The field contained forty-eight teams, and each program was allocated to one of four sectionals. All sectional games were played on campus sites, while the national semifinals, third-place final, and championship finals were contested at the Salem Civic Center in Salem, Virginia.

Wisconsin–Stevens Point defeated defending champions Williams, 84–82, in the championship, clinching their first national title.

The Pointers (29–5) were coached by Jack Bennett.

Nick Bennett, also from Stevens Point, was named Most Outstanding Player.

== Bracket ==
=== Top left sectional ===
First round
Pomona–Pitzer	79
Colorado College	55
UW–Stevens Point	84
Benedictine (IL)	58
Sul Ross State	71
Dallas	67
Lawrence	86
Lakeland	51

Second round
Puget Sound	89
Pomona–Pitzer	75
UW–Stevens Point	66
Gustavus Adolphus	55
Trinity (TX)	72
Sul Ross State	74
Lawrence	72
Buena Vista	66

Sectional semifinals
Puget Sound	79
UW–Stevens Point	100
Sul Ross State	79
Lawrence	86*

Sectional finals
UW–Stevens Point	82*
Lawrence	81

=== Bottom left sectional ===
First round
John Carroll	88
Calvin	77
Randolph–Macon	51
Methodist	50
Illinois Wesleyan	82
Maryville (MO)	73
Penn State Behrend	58
Potsdam State	60

Second round
Wittenberg	64
John Carroll	85
Randolph-Macon	68
Maryville (TN)	75
Hanover	67
Illinois Wesleyan	77
Potsdam State	56
Wooster	70

Sectional semifinals
John Carroll	76
Maryville (TN)	74
Illinois Wesleyan	53
Wooster	58

Sectional finals
John Carroll	70
Wooster	64

=== Top right sectional ===
First round
Trinity (CT)	72
Lasell	66
Salem State	94
Johnson & Wales (RI)	80
Hamilton	83
St. John Fisher	90
Endicott	56
Babson	66

Second round
Brockport State	80
Trinity (CT)	76
Salem State	77
Williams	91
Rochester	75
St. John Fisher	66
Babson	55
Keene State	79

Sectional semifinals
Brockport State	50
Williams	78
Rochester	79
Keene State	82

Sectional finals
Williams	79
Keene State	64

=== Bottom right sectional ===
First round
Lycoming	74
Lehman	68
Plymouth State	75
Castleton State	57
Hampden–Sydney	74
Elizabethtown	71
Catholic	75
Old Westbury	50

Second round
New Jersey City	74
Lycoming	67
Plymouth State	85
Amherst	113
Franklin & Marshall	78
Hampden–Sydney	76
Catholic	72
Gwynedd–Mercy	74*

Sectional semifinals
New Jersey City	74
Amherst	92
Franklin & Marshall	92
Gwynedd–Mercy	74

Sectional finals
Amherst	82
Franklin & Marshall	70

=== National finals ===
- Site: Salem Civic Center, Salem, Virginia

National Semifinals
UW–Stevens Point	87
John Carroll	62
Williams	86
Amherst	81

National Championship
UW–Stevens Point	84
Williams	82
National Third-place
John Carroll	96
Amherst	85

== See also ==
- 2004 NCAA Division I men's basketball tournament
- 2004 NCAA Division II men's basketball tournament
- 2004 NCAA Division III women's basketball tournament
- 2004 NAIA Division I men's basketball tournament
