= 2004 NCAA Division III women's basketball tournament =

- Teams: 50
- Finals site: Jane P. Batten Student Center, Virginia Beach, Virginia
- Champions: Wilmington Quakers (1st title)
- Runner-up: Bowdoin Polar Bears (1st title game)
- Third place: Rochester Yellowjackets (2nd Final Four)
- Fourth place: Wisconsin–Stevens Point Pointers (3rd Final Four)
- Winning coach: Jerry Scheve (1st title)
- MOP: Tara Rausch (Wilmington (OH))
- Attendance: 29,162

The 2004 NCAA Division III women's basketball tournament was the 23rd annual tournament hosted by the NCAA to determine the national champion of Division III women's collegiate basketball in the United States.

Wilmington (OH) defeated Bowdoin in the championship game, 59–53, to claim the Quakers' first Division III national title.

The championship rounds were hosted by Virginia Wesleyan College from March 19–20 at the Jane P. Batten Student Center in Virginia Beach, Virginia.

== Bracket ==
=== Top left sectional ===
First round March 3, 2004; Campus sites
Union (NY)*	78
Mount Saint Mary	47
Ithaca*	60
Cortland State	64
Johns Hopkins*	71
Alvernia	53
McDaniel*	71
Pitt Greensburg	64
TCNJ*	60
Hunter	52

Second round March 6, 2004; Campus sites
NYU*	69
Union (NY)	50
Cortland State	50
Rochester (NY)*	65
Marymount (VA)*	73
Johns Hopkins	57
McDaniel*	70
TCNJ	65

Sectional semifinals March 12, 2004; Arlington, VA
NYU	68
Rochester	77
Marymount (VA)	68
McDaniel	64

Sectional finals March 13, 2004; Arlington, VA
Rochester	61
Marymount (VA)	57

=== Bottom left sectional ===
First round March 3, 2004; Campus sites
Wilmington (OH)*	66
Albion	62
DePauw*	88
Aurora	44
Chapman*	57
Claremont-Mudd-Scripps	47
Carleton*	58
Lakeland	42

Second round March 6, 2004; Campus sites
Franklin*	60
Wilmington (OH)	75
DePauw	63
Thomas More*	68
Puget Sound*	61
Chapman	53
Carleton	61
Buena Vista*	69

Sectional semifinals March 12, 2004; Crestview Hills, KY
Wilmington (OH)	78
Thomas More	75
Puget Sound	70
Buena Vista	66

Sectional finals March 13, 2004; Crestview Hills, KY
Wilmington (OH)	63
Puget Sound	60

=== Top right sectional ===
First round March 3, 2004; Campus sites
Gwynedd-Mercy*	66
Widener	52
Wittenberg*	81
Penn State Behrend	49
Salve Regina*	61
Emmanuel (MA)	58
Salem State*	78
Clark (MA)	67
Husson	57
Southern Maine*	80

Second round March 6, 2004; Campus sites
Scranton*	60
Gwynedd-Mercy	58
Wittenberg	51
Messiah*	48
Bowdoin*	57
Salve Regina	44
Salem State	57
Southern Maine	80

Sectional semifinals March 12, 2004; Brunswick, ME
Scranton	68
Wittenberg	51
Bowdoin	59
Southern Maine	55

Sectional finals March 13, 2004; Brunswick, ME
Scranton	58
Bowdoin	71

=== Bottom right sectional ===
First round March 3, 2004; Campus sites
Ripon*	69
Wheaton (IL)	51
Millikin*	69
Maryville (MO)	53
Maryville (TN)*	101
Mary Baldwin	51
Bethany (WV)*	60
Christopher Newport	61

Second round March 6, 2004; Campus sites
UW Stevens Point*	84
Ripon	66
Millikin	59
Washington St. Louis*	72
Hardin–Simmons*	96
Maryville (MO)	72
Christopher Newport	62
Eastern Mennonite*	63

Sectional semifinals March 12, 2004; Stevens Point, WI
UW Stevens Point	83
Washington St. Louis	76
Hardin–Simmons	91
Eastern Mennonite	64

Sectional finals March 13, 2004; Stevens Point, WI
UW Stevens Point	72
Hardin–Simmons	67

=== Final Four ===
Final Four; March 19, 2004
Rochester	63
Wilmington (OH)	74
Bowdoin	64
UW Stevens Point	59

National championship March 20, 2004
Wilmington (OH)	59
Bowdoin	53
Third place March 20, 2004
Rochester	64
UW Stevens Point	63

== All-tournament team ==
- Tara Rausch, Wilmington
- Amy Kincer, Wilmington
- Erika Smith, Rochester
- Kelly Wescott, Rochester
- Amanda Nechuta, Wisconsin–Stevens Point
- Lora Trenkle, Bowdoin

== See also ==
- 2004 NCAA Division I women's basketball tournament
- 2004 NCAA Division II women's basketball tournament
- 2004 NAIA Division I women's basketball tournament
- 2004 NAIA Division II women's basketball tournament
- 2004 NCAA Division III men's basketball tournament
