= 2004 NAIA Division I men's basketball tournament =

College basketball tournament

- Teams: 32
- Finals site: Municipal Auditorium; Kansas City, Missouri
- Champions: Mountain State (1st title)
- Runner-up: Concordia (CA) (2nd title game)
- Semifinalists: Georgetown (KY) (10th Final Four); Mobile (2nd Final Four)
- Coach of the year: Bob Bolen (Mountain State)
- Player of the year: Zach Moss (Mountain State)
- Charles Stevenson Hustle Award: Chris Victor (Concordia (CA))
- Chuck Taylor MVP: Zach Moss (Mountain State)
- Attendance: 23,434
- Top scorer: Zach Moss (Mountain State) (138 points)

The 2004 Buffalo Funds - NAIA Men's Division I Basketball Tournament was held in March at Municipal Auditorium in Kansas City, Missouri. This was the 67th annual NAIA DI basketball tournament and featured 32 teams playing in a single-elimination format. This was the third year the tournament was held in Kansas City. The 2004 NAIA national championship game featured the #1 ranked Cougars of Mountain State and the #6 ranked Eagles of Concordia University (CA). This match up was a repeat of the 2003 tournament. The Cougars defeated the Eagles 74–70. The other teams that rounded out the NAIA national semifinals were Georgetown College (KY) and University of Mobile, respectively.

== Awards and honors ==
- Leading scorer: Zach Moss, Mountain State – in 5 games, Moss scored a total of 138 points, including 54 field goals and 30 free throws, averaging 27.6 points per game
- Leading rebounder: Nick VanderLaan, Concordia (CA) – in 5 games, VanderLaan recorded 71 rebounds at 14.2 per game
- Most consecutive tournament appearances: 13 – Georgetown (KY)
- Most tournament appearances: Georgetown (KY) – 23rd of 28 appearances in the NAIA Tournament

== 2004 NAIA bracket ==
First round	Second round
1	Mountain State	79
–	Reinhardt	68
1	Mountain State	84
–	Wayland Baptist	66
–	Wayland Baptist	73
16	Missouri Baptist	68
TOP TIER
9	Cumberland (TN)	68
–	Biola	64
9	Cumberland	74
8	Oklahoma Baptist	86
–	Xavier (LA)	67
8	Oklahoma Baptist	75
5	Georgetown (KY)	88
–	McKendree	56
5	Georgetown (KY)	65
–	Westminster (UT)	55
–	Westminster (UT)	74
12	Lubbock Christian	65
TOP TIER
13	Union (TN)	53*
–	Barber–Scotia	61
-	Barber–Scotia	74
4	Robert Morris (IL)	61
–	Langston	67
4	Robert Morris (IL)	102
3	Lindsey Wilson	70
–	Martin Methodist	53
3	Lindsey Wilson	66
14	Southern–New Orleans	55
–	Brescia	47
14	Southern–New Orleans	60
BOTTOM TIER
11	Houston Baptist	64
-	John Brown	72
–	John Brown	65
6	Concordia (CA)	70
–	St. Xavier	72
6	Concordia (CA)	82
7	Columbia (MO)	48
–	Oklahoma City	81
–	Oklahoma City	79
10	Lewis–Clark State	65
–	Pikeville	65
10	Lewis–Clark State	67
BOTTOM TIER
15	Mobile	77
–	Southern Tech	67
15	Mobile	76
2	Azusa Pacific	75
–	Voorhees	79
2	Azusa Pacific	112

Elite Eight
1	Mountain State	87
8	Oklahoma Baptist	84
5	Georgetown (KY)	64
–	Barber–Scotia	60
3	Lindsey Wilson	58
6	Concordia (CA)	61
-	Oklahoma City	62
15	Mobile	75

NAIA national semifinals
1	Mountain State	96
5	Georgetown (KY)	77
6	Concordia (CA)	72
15	Mobile	57

NAIA national championship
1	Mountain State	74
6	Concordia (CA)	70

- * denotes overtime.

== See also ==
- 2004 NAIA Division I women's basketball tournament
- 2004 NCAA Division I men's basketball tournament
- 2004 NCAA Division II men's basketball tournament
- 2004 NCAA Division III men's basketball tournament
- 2004 NAIA Division II men's basketball tournament
