= Antoine Pettway =

American basketball player and coach (born 1982)

Current position
- Title: Head coach
- Team: Kennesaw State
- Conference: C-USA
- Record: 59–45 (.567)

Biographical details
- Born: November 13, 1982 (age 44); Tuscaloosa, Alabama, U.S.

Playing career
- 2000–2004: Alabama
- 2004–2005: Kentucky Reach
- 2004–2005: Huntsville Flight

Coaching career (HC unless noted)
- 2005–2006: Alabama (GA)
- 2006–2008: Jacksonville State (assistant)
- 2008–2010: Alabama (assistant)
- 2013–2023: Alabama (assistant)
- 2023–present: Kennesaw State

Administrative career (AD unless noted)
- 2010–2013: Alabama (DBO)

Head coaching record
- Overall: 59–45 (.567)
- Tournaments: 0–0

Accomplishments and honors

Championships
- CUSA tournament (2026)

Awards
- Ben Jobe Award (2026); WBA Rookie of the Year (2005)

Antoine Pettway (born November 13, 1982) is an American former basketball player and current coach. He is the head coach of the Kennesaw State Owls men's basketball team.

== Playing career ==
Pettway attended Wilcox Central High School in Camden, Alabama, where he helped lead his team to a state championship.

Pettway walked on at the University of Alabama. As a senior, during the 2003–04 season, he started in every game, as the Crimson Tide made the Elite Eight. That season, he averaged nine points, four assists, and four rebounds.

During the summer of 2004, Pettway joined the Kentucky Reach of the World Basketball Association. He averaged 13 points and five assists, while being named the league's rookie of the year. After the season's conclusion, Pettway signed with the Huntsville Flight of the NBA D-League.

== Coaching career ==
Pettway began coaching in 2005 serving as a graduate assistant at his alma mater Alabama. In 2006, he joined Jacksonville State as a full-time assistant coach. Pettway stayed with the Gamecocks until 2008, when he returned to Alabama as an assistant coach. In 2010, he switched to being Alabama's director of basketball operations, holding this position until 2013. He then returned to being an assistant coach, a position in which he would remain for the rest of his tenure.

On April 7, 2023, Pettway was named the head coach at Kennesaw State, replacing Amir Abdur-Rahim.

== Head coaching record ==
Record table
| Season | Team | Overall | Conference | Standing | Postseason |
|---|---|---|---|---|---|
Kennesaw State Owls (Atlantic Sun Conference) (2023–2024)
| 2023–24 | Kennesaw State | 15–16 | 6–10 | 9th | |
Kennesaw State Owls (Conference USA) (2024–present)
| 2024–25 | Kennesaw State | 19–14 | 10–8 | T–4th | |
| 2025–26 | Kennesaw State | 21–14 | 10–10 | T–6th | NCAA Division I Round of 64 |
| 2026–27 | Kennesaw State | 4–1 | 0–0 | | |
| Kennesaw State: | | 59–45 (.567) | 26–28 (.481) | | |
| Total: | | 59–45 (.567) | | | |
National champion Postseason invitational champion Conference regular season champion Conference regular season and conference tournament champion Division regular season champion Division regular season and conference tournament champion Conference tournament champion
