= Darcie Vincent =

American basketball coach (born 1970)

Biographical details
- Born: March 18, 1970 (age 56)

Playing career
- 1988–1992: Duquesne

Coaching career (HC unless noted)
- 1992–1994: Duquesne (graduate assistant)
- 1994–1996: Slippery Rock (assistant)
- 1996–2000: Slippery Rock
- 2000–2008: California (PA)
- 2008–2014: Appalachian State

Darcie Vincent (born March 18, 1970) was the head women's basketball coach at Appalachian State University until September 5, 2014 when she resigned as head coach. She previously coached at California University of Pennsylvania, where she coached the Vulcans to a 212–47 record. In 2004, the Vulcans won the Division II National Title with a 35–1 record. She also coached at Slippery Rock University of Pennsylvania for four years where she posted a 52–54 record.
