= Ben Jobe Award =

Annual basketball award

- Awarded for: the nation's top minority men's coach in NCAA Division I basketball
- Country: United States
- Presented by: Collegeinsider.com

History
- First award: 2010
- Most recent: Antoine Pettway, Kennesaw State
- Website: Official website

The Ben Jobe National Coach of the Year Award is an award given annually to the most outstanding minority men's college basketball head coach in NCAA Division I competition. The award was established in 2010 and is named for head coach Ben Jobe, who coached at numerous historically black colleges but whose longest tenure at one school was 12 years, which he completed at Southern University. Over his career he compiled a 524–334 overall record, including six conference regular season championships, five conference tournament championships, and eight national postseason appearances.

The award is presented to the coach who has produced the best results from his basketball team under adverse or otherwise difficult conditions. The inaugural winner, Ed Cooley of Fairfield, dealt with numerous injuries but still managed to lead the Stags to a near-school record 23 wins in 2009–10. There has been only one repeat winner, Donte Jackson of Grambling State, who won in 2018 and again in 2024.

== Key ==
Coach (X)	Denotes the number of times the coach has been awarded the Ben Jobe National Coach of the Year Award at that point
W, L, W %	Total wins, total losses, win percentage
Finish	National postseason tournament result

== Winners ==
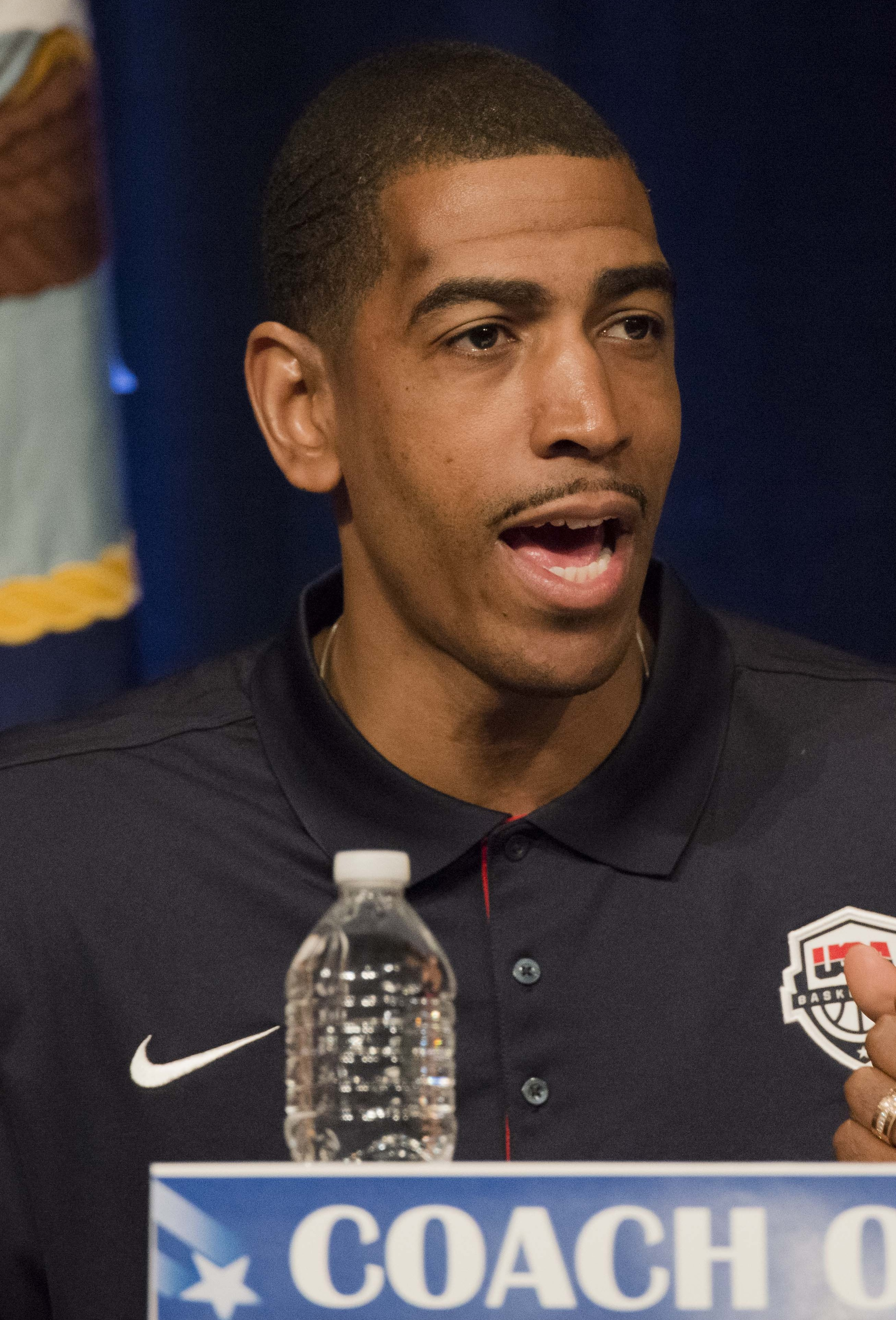
Kevin Ollie, UConn, 2013

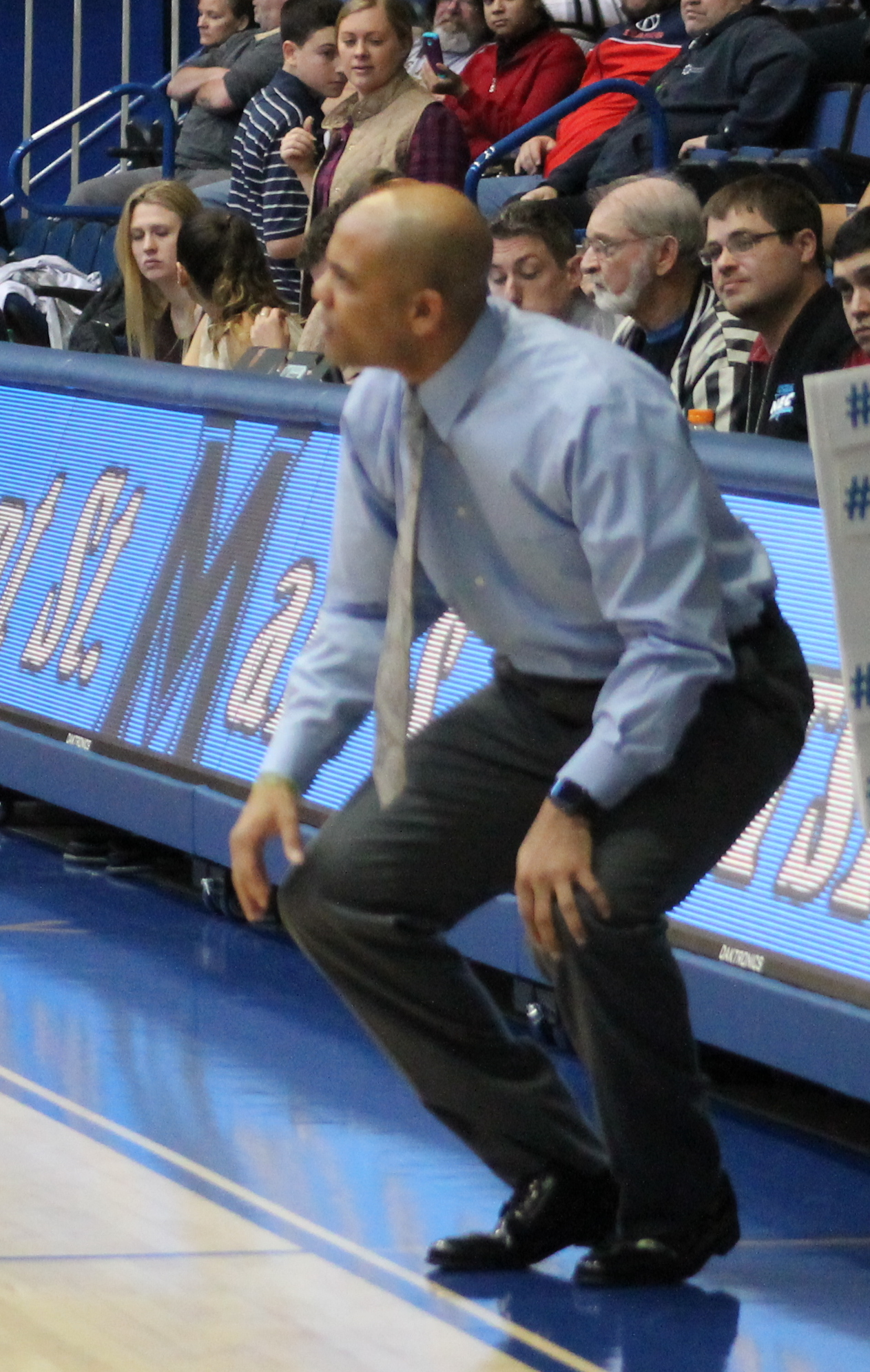
Jamion Christian, Mount St. Mary's, 2017

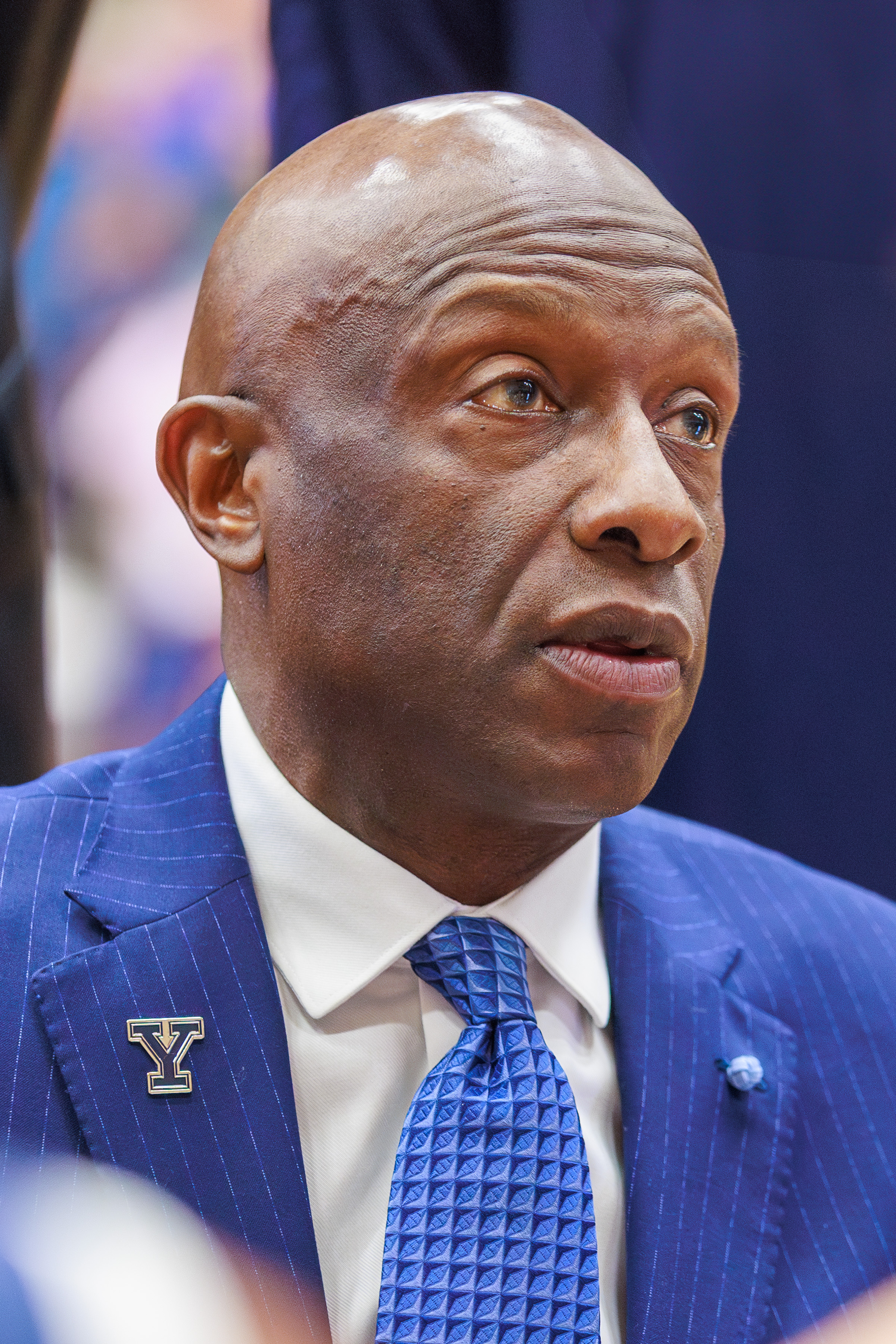
James Jones, Yale, 2019

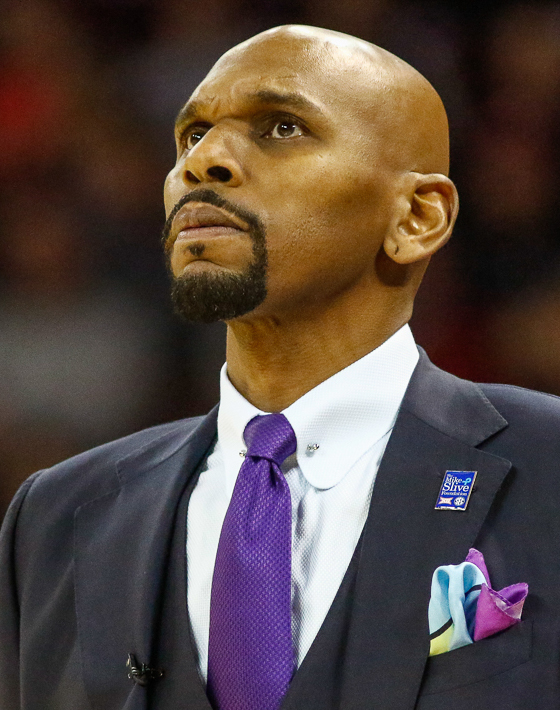
Jerry Stackhouse, Vanderbilt, 2023

Season	Coach	School	W	L	W %	Finish	Reference
2009–10	Ed Cooley	Fairfield	23	10	.697	CIT quarterfinals	
2010–11	Cuonzo Martin	Missouri State	26	9	.743	NIT second round	
2011–12	Sean Woods	Mississippi Valley State	21	13	.618	NCAA First Four	
2012–13	Kevin Ollie	UConn	20	10	.667	—	
2013–14	Willis Wilson	Texas A&M–Corpus Christi	18	16	.529	CIT second round	
2014–15	Bobby Collins	Maryland Eastern Shore	18	15	.545	CIT first round	
2015–16	Dana Ford	Tennessee State	20	11	.645	CIT first round	
2016–17	Jamion Christian	Mount St. Mary's	20	16	.556	NCAA first round	
2017–18	Donte Jackson	Grambling State	17	14	.548	—	
2018–19	James Jones	Yale	22	8	.733	NCAA first round	
2019–20	Damon Stoudamire	Pacific	23	10	.697	N/A^{[a]}	
2020–21	Leonard Hamilton	Florida State	18	7	.720	NCAA Sweet Sixteen	
2021–22	Kelvin Sampson	Houston	32	6	.842	NCAA Elite Eight	
2022–23	Jerry Stackhouse	Vanderbilt	22	15	.595	NIT quarterfinals	
2023–24	Donte Jackson (2)	Grambling State	21	15	.583	NCAA first round	
2024–25	Chris Crutchfield	Omaha	22	13	.629	NCAA first round	
2025–26	Antoine Pettway	Kennesaw State	21	14	.600	NCAA first round	

- ^{a} The COVID-19 pandemic caused the 2019–20 season to be canceled prior to any national postseason tournaments occurring.
