= 2004 NAIA Division I women's basketball tournament =

- Teams: 32
- Finals site: Oman Arena, Jackson, Tennessee
- Champions: Southern Nazarene Crimson Storm (7th title, 9th title game, 13th Fab Four)
- Runner-up: Oklahoma City Stars (7th title game, 7th Fab Four)
- Semifinalists: Brescia Bearcats (1st Fab Four); Houston Baptist Huskies (1st Fab Four)
- Coach of the year: Lori Carter (Southern Nazarene)
- Player of the year: Kesha Watson (Oklahoma City)
- Chuck Taylor MVP: Ndeye Ndiaye (Southern Nazarene)
- Top scorer: Kesha Watson (Oklahoma City) (106 points)

The 2004 NAIA Division I women's basketball tournament was the tournament held by the NAIA to determine the national champion of women's college basketball among its Division I members in the United States and Canada for the 2003–04 basketball season.

In a rematch of the 2003 final, defending champions Southern Nazarene defeated Oklahoma City in the championship game, 77–61, to claim the Crimson Storm's seventh NAIA national title.

The tournament was played at the Oman Arena in Jackson, Tennessee.

== Qualification ==
The tournament field remained fixed at thirty-two teams, which were sorted into one of four quadrants and seeded from 1 to 8 within each quadrant.

The tournament continued to utilize a simple single-elimination format.

== Bracket ==
First round
1	Oklahoma City	86
8	Langston	49
5	Trevecca Nazarene	53
4	Dillard	63
3	Campbellsville	67
6	Lubbock Christian	54
7	Azusa Pacific	62
2	North Georgia	66
2	Houston Baptist	89
7	Montana Western	79
6	Wayland Baptist	57
3	Columbia (MO)	71
4	Georgetown (KY)	60
5	John Brown	48
8	Biola	64
1	Freed–Hardeman	80
1	Vanguard	63
8	Saint Xavier	51
5	Oklahoma Christian	69
4	Xavier Louisiana	55
3	Cumberlands (KY)	45
6	Westmont	69
7	Carroll (MT)	56
2	Brescia	64
2	Union (TN)	72
7	McKendree	61
6	Oklahoma Baptist	55
3	Auburn Montgomery	61
4	Point Loma Nazarene	75
5	Lindsey Wilson	61
8	Claflin	46
1	Southern Nazarene	72

Second round
1	Oklahoma City	66
4	Dillard	46
3	Campbellsville	60
2	North Georgia	70
2	Houston Baptist	79
3	Columbia (MO)	66
4	Georgetown (KY)	59
1	Freed–Hardeman	69
1	Vanguard	82
5	Oklahoma Christian	64
6	Westmont	42
2	Brescia	43
2	Union (TN)	68
3	Auburn Montgomery	47
4	Point Loma Nazarene	56
1	Southern Nazarene	73

Elite Eight
1	Oklahoma City	82
2	North Georgia	63
2	Houston Baptist	74
1	Freed–Hardeman	61
1	Vanguard	61
2	Brescia	65
2	Union (TN)	66
1	Southern Nazarene	82

Final Four
1	Oklahoma City	81
2	Houston Baptist	69
2	Brescia	59
1	Southern Nazarene	66

National championship
1	Oklahoma City	61
1	Southern Nazarene	77

== See also ==
- 2004 NAIA Division I men's basketball tournament
- 2004 NCAA Division I women's basketball tournament
- 2004 NCAA Division II women's basketball tournament
- 2004 NCAA Division III women's basketball tournament
- 2004 NAIA Division II women's basketball tournament
