= Flagler Saints =

Coordinates: 29.89237°N 81.31522°W

- University: Flagler College
- NCAA: Division II
- Conference: Peach Belt (primary)
- Athletic director: Jud Damon
- Location: St. Augustine, Florida
- First season: 1973
- Varsity teams: 20 (9 men's, 10 women's, 1 co-ed)
- Basketball arena: Flagler Gymnasium
- Baseball stadium: Drysdale Field
- Softball stadium: Flagler Field
- Soccer stadium: Saints Field
- Lacrosse stadium: Flagler Lacrosse Field
- Tennis venue: Flagler Tennis Center
- Nickname: Saints
- Colors: Crimson and gold
- Website: flaglerathletics.com
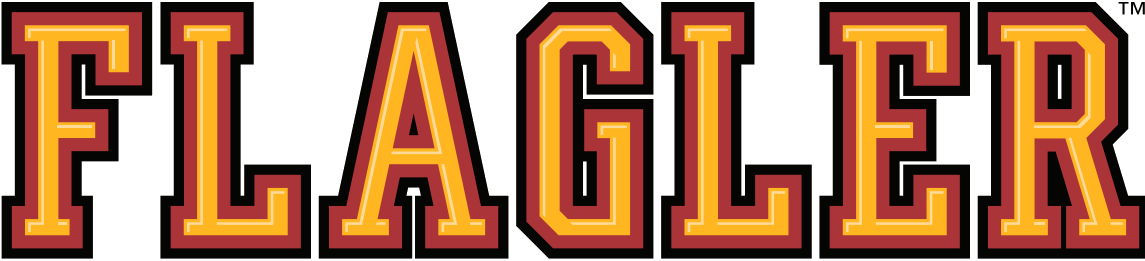

The Flagler Saints are the athletic teams that represent Flagler College, located in St. Augustine, Florida, in intercollegiate sports at the Division II level of the National Collegiate Athletic Association (NCAA), primarily competing in the Peach Belt Conference since the 2009–10 academic year.

Flagler competes in twenty intercollegiate varsity sports. Men's sports include baseball, basketball, cross country, golf, lacrosse, soccer, tennis, and track and field; while women's sports include basketball, cross country, golf, lacrosse, soccer, softball, tennis, track and field, and volleyball. The Saints also have a cheer team.

== History ==
Flagler College was founded in 1968 and its athletics teams started in the 1973–74 academic year. The first sports at Flagler were: men's and women's basketball, men's cross country, men's soccer, slow-pitch softball, men's and women's tennis, volleyball and baseball.

In 1977, Flagler's athletic programs became members of the National Association of Intercollegiate Athletics (NAIA) and in 1990 became charter members of the Florida Sun Conference (now known as The Sun Conference). On February 14, 2006, Flagler announced its official move to NCAA Division II and on July 1, 2009, announced its membership in the Peach Belt Conference.

== Conference affiliations ==
Unaffiliated

- Independent (1973–1977)

NAIA

- Independent (1977–1990)
- Florida Sun Conference (1990–2006)

NCAA

- Independent (2006–2009)
- Peach Belt Conference (2009–present)
- Sunshine State Conference (2027-)

== Varsity teams ==
Flagler competes in 19 intercollegiate varsity sports: Men's sports include baseball, basketball, cross country, golf, lacrosse, soccer, tennis and track & field (indoor); while women's sports include basketball, cross country, golf, lacrosse, soccer, softball, tennis, track & field (indoor) and volleyball. There are also two spirit squad teams: cheerleading and pep band.

Men's sports	Women's sports
Baseball	Basketball
Basketball	Cross country
Cross country	Golf
Golf	Indoor track & field
Indoor track & field	Lacrosse
Lacrosse	Soccer
Soccer	Softball
Tennis	Tennis
	Volleyball

=== Women's tennis ===
Flagler has won five NAIA national titles in women's tennis (1987, 1988, 1989, 1990 and 1991) and was the national runners-up in 1992.

=== Women's volleyball ===
The volleyball team has won the Peach Belt Conference regular conference title 5 times (2009–11 and 2016–17) and won the conference tournament 6 times (2009–11 and 2015–17). Flagler volleyball has made it to NCAA Regional Tournament 7 times (2009–12 and 2015–17) winning the Southeast Regional title in 2009, 2011, and 2017. The 2011 team made it to the Elite 8 while the 2009 and 2017 teams made it to the Final 4. Taylor Mott won the Coach of the Year Award in the Peach Belt Conference 3 times (2009–11).

=== Men's tennis ===
The men's tennis program claimed the NAIA national title in 1977 and 1986. They were the national runner-up in 1985.

In 2020 the men's tennis team reached the NCAA division II final four falling to Barry University

=== Men's basketball ===
The men's basketball teams competed in the NAIA national tournament three times (2003, 2004 and 2005) and advanced to the second round in the last two trips. The Saints were ranked in the NAIA Top 25 at least once every year from 1995 to 2006, with the exception being 1999.

Recently in 2020 and 2021 the men's basketball team made it to the NCAA Division II basketball tournament. In 2020 they made it to the final four winning there conference championship while in 2021 they made it to the elite 8 after falling to the Augusta Jags in the Peach Belt Conference championship.

== National championships ==
=== Team ===
Sport	Association	Division	Year	Runner-up	Score
Men's tennis (2)	NAIA	Single	1977	Southwest Texas State	31–24
Men's tennis (2)	NAIA	Single	1986	Lander	33–30
Women's tennis (5)	NAIA	Single	1987	North Florida	28–25
Women's tennis (5)	NAIA	Single	1988	Boca Raton	45–29
Women's tennis (5)	NAIA	Single	1989	Grand Canyon	32–27
Women's tennis (5)	NAIA	Single	1990	Boca Raton	30–26
Women's tennis (5)	NAIA	Single	1991	Auburn Montgomery	27–25

== Notable alumni ==
=== Men's soccer ===
- Joseph Toby
- Marco Warren

=== Women's soccer ===
- Andrea Fernández

== Facilities ==
=== Flagler Gymnasium ===
Since 1976, the Flagler Gymnasium has been home to the men's and women's basketball and women's volleyball programs. The gymnasium seats 1,750 spectators. Over the past decade, Flagler Gym has received a number of physical improvements and modifications and equipment upgrades. The weight room is equipped with free weights and state-of-the-art Cybex equipment. In the summer of 1998, a new pro-style maple floor was installed which was refurbished over the summer of 2006 and the new athletics logo is the centerpiece of the floor. The locker rooms were rebuilt in 2005. Men's basketball, women's basketball and women's volleyball all have their own locker rooms and there is an additional visitor's locker room. Also constructed were new offices for four coaches and an athletic training room. The volleyball and men's and women's basketball coaches have offices located in the front of the gym.

=== Drysdale Field ===
The baseball field, Drysdale Field, was dedicated April 12, 2011, before the Flagler-Savannah College of Art and Design game. The field is named in honor of Walter Irvine Drysdale (1905–1993), a native of St. Augustine. "Driz" as he was called, was a star athlete in high school and went on to the University of Florida, where he played freshman football. He gave tennis lessons at the Ponce de Leon and Alcazar Hotels, was a club champion golfer and was a catcher on the St. Augustine Saints professional baseball team.
