= Tony Ingle =

American basketball player (1952–2021)

Biographical details
- Born: June 11, 1952; Dalton, Georgia, U.S.
- Died: January 18, 2021 (aged 68); Provo, Utah, U.S.

Playing career
- 1971–1973: Dalton Junior College
- 1973–1975: Huntingdon College

Coaching career (HC unless noted)
- 1985–1988: Cherokee High School (Georgia)
- 1988–1989: Alabama–Huntsville
- 1989–1996: BYU (assistant)
- 1996–1997: BYU
- 1997–1999: Utah Jazz (scout)
- 2000–2011: Kennesaw State
- 2013–2018: Dalton State

Head coaching record
- Overall: 140–99 (.586)

Accomplishments and honors

Championships
- NCAA Division II tournament (2004); NAIA Division I tournament (2015)

Tony Ingle (June 11, 1952 – January 18, 2021) was an American college basketball coach. He served as head coach for the men's basketball teams at Kennesaw State, Dalton State College in Georgia, and as interim head coach at BYU.

== Playing career ==
Born in Dalton, Georgia, Ingle was a star player at North Whitfield High School in Georgia. He played varsity all four seasons and earned MVP honors for the team in both his junior and senior years. In his final season (1971), he was named First Team All-Tri State Squad by the Chattanooga Free Press.

His collegiate career began at Dalton Junior College. In each of his two years at the school, the Roadrunners won the state and regional championships for junior colleges. Ingle finished his playing career at Huntingdon College in Montgomery, Alabama.

== Coaching career ==
Ingle's coaching career began before his playing career was over. He coached local youth teams during his time as a student at Huntingdon College. After graduating with a degree in physical education, he returned to Georgia, where he coached at three different high schools. Ingle led Cherokee High School of Canton, Ga., to the state championship game in 1982, finishing runner-up.

His college coaching career began at Gordon College in Barnesville, Georgia. He was tasked with restarting a basketball program that had been dormant for over a decade. Ingle built a winning program at Gordon; posting a record of 61–32 in three seasons at the school. In his final season, Ingle led the Hilltoppers to the NJCAA Region XVII championship game. In 1988, he took the head coaching job at the University of Alabama in Huntsville. The team posted a 10–18 record, but it was actually an improvement over the previous three seasons, when UAH won just 16 total games.

Ingle entered the world of Division I college basketball in 1989, when he joined Roger Reid's staff at Brigham Young University in Provo, Utah. Ingle served as an assistant under Reid for seven seasons. During that time, BYU saw tremendous success on the basketball court: the Cougars won five WAC championships and made five appearances in the NCAA Tournament. However, the program crashed early in the 1996–97 season. The team was decimated by injuries, and several key players left the school. After starting the season with a 1–6 record, Reid was fired, and Ingle took over as interim head coach. BYU didn't win another game the rest of the season, posting an 0–19 record under Ingle.

In the off-season, BYU hired Steve Cleveland as the new head coach for the basketball team, leaving Ingle without a job. He found part-time work as a scout for the Utah Jazz of the NBA, and also did some sports color commentary for the Mountain West Conference. But he always wanted to return to coaching, and he found a great opportunity in 2000 when a friend from the coaching community alerted him about a coaching vacancy at Kennesaw State University.

Kennesaw's basketball team had struggled for many seasons, and Ingle was hired to turn the program around. He did just that, and very quickly. In 2002–03, the Owls set a school record by winning 25 games, and they made their first-ever appearance in the NCAA Division II national tournament. The following season was even better, as KSU captured the Division II national championship with Ingle leading the way.

In 2005–06, the Owls transitioned to Division I basketball. The team joined the Atlantic Sun Conference and struggled through several up-and-down seasons. Early in the 2010–11 season, the team achieved its biggest win ever as a Division I program, posting an 80–63 upset victory over Georgia Tech. However, KSU finished the year with a disappointing 8–23 record, and Ingle was fired. In addition to losing many games, the team had struggled to meet NCAA academic standards, which ultimately led to Ingle's dismissal.

In 2013, Ingle was hired by Dalton State College, where he had played many years previous, to re-launch the basketball program after a 35-year hiatus. In 2014–15 – just the program's second season, and their first year of eligibility – the team captured the NAIA national championship. For his efforts, Ingle was honored as NAIA's Coach of the Year. He retired in August 2018.

== Personal life and death ==
With his wife Jeanne, Ingle was a parent to five children including three sons who are also involved in college basketball. Ingle also had five grandchildren. Ingle was a member of the Church of Jesus Christ of Latter-day Saints (LDS Church).

In his childhood, Ingle endured five surgeries to repair a facial deformity.

In 2009, he co-authored a book about his life entitled "I Don't Mind Hitting the Bottom, I Just Hate Dragging".

Ingle died from complications of COVID-19 at Utah Valley Hospital in Provo, on January 18, 2021, during the COVID-19 pandemic in Utah. He was 68 years old.
