= 2004 NCAA Division II men's basketball tournament =

Basketball tournament

- Teams: 64
- Finals site: Centennial Garden, Bakersfield, California
- Champions: Kennesaw State (1st title)
- Runner-up: Southern Indiana (3rd title game)
- Semifinalists: Humboldt State (1st Final Four); Metro State (4th Final Four)
- Winning coach: Tony Ingle (1st title)
- MOP: Terrence Hill (Kennesaw State)

The 2004 NCAA Division II men's basketball tournament was the 48th annual single-elimination tournament to determine the national champion of men's NCAA Division II college basketball in the United States.

Officially culminating the 2003–04 NCAA Division II men's basketball season, the tournament featured sixty-four teams from around the country.

The Elite Eight, national semifinals, and championship were played at the Centennial Garden in Bakersfield, California, previously the venue of the 2001 finals.

Kennesaw State (35–4) defeated Southern Indiana in the final, 84–59, to win their first Division II national championship.

The Owls were coached by Tony Ingle. Kennesaw State's Terrence Hill was the Most Outstanding Player.

2004 NCAA Division II Men's sites - regionals (cyan) Elite Eight (red)

== Regionals ==
=== Great Lakes - Romeoville, Illinois ===
Location: Neil Carey Arena Host: Lewis University

First round Round of 64; March 13
1	Lewis	62
8	Wayne State (MI)	65
4	Gannon	81
5	Michigan Tech	75
3	Southern Indiana	96
6	~~Kentucky Wesleyan~~	83
2	Findlay (OT)	84
7	Indianapolis	83

Regional semifinal Round of 32; March 14
8	Wayne State (MI)	57
4	Gannon	54
3	Southern Indiana	75
2	Findlay	67

Regional final Sweet 16; March 16
8	Wayne State (MI)	68
3	Southern Indiana	69

=== South Central - Stephenville, Texas ===
Location: Wisdom Gymnasium Host: Tarleton State University

First round Round of 64; March 13
1	Tarleton State	77
8	Texas A&M–Kingsville	74
4	Emporia State	81
5	Drury	85
3	Northwest Missouri State	77
6	Eastern New Mexico	57
2	Washburn	81
7	St. Mary's (TX)	70

Regional semifinal Round of 32; March 14
1	Tarleton State	73
5	Drury (OT)	78
3	Northwest Missouri State	62
2	Washburn	61

Regional final Sweet 16; March 16
5	Drury	59
3	Northwest Missouri State	62

=== South - Valdosta, Georgia ===
Location: The Complex Host: Valdosta State University

First round Round of 64; March 13
1	Valdosta State	49
8	Montevallo	56
4	Morehouse	51
5	Henderson State	71
3	Florida Southern	62
6	Eckerd	70
2	Rollins	88
7	Benedict	79

Regional semifinal Round of 32; March 14
8	Montevallo	78
5	Henderson State	57
6	Eckerd	54
2	Rollins	77

Regional final Sweet 16; March 16
8	Montevallo	63
2	Rollins	75

=== North Central - Denver, Colorado ===
Location: Auraria Events Center Host: Metropolitan State University

First round Round of 64; March 13
1	Metro State	102
8	Mesa State	72
4	South Dakota State	99
5	Northern State	80
3	Nebraska-Omaha	71
6	South Dakota	82
2	Nebraska–Kearney	104
7	Bemidji State	90

Regional semifinal Round of 32; March 14
1	Metro State	109
4	South Dakota State	69
6	South Dakota	80
2	Nebraska–Kearney	96

Regional final Sweet 16; March 16
1	Metro State	79
2	Nebraska–Kearney	68

=== East - Misenheimer, North Carolina ===
Location: Merner Gym Host: Pfeiffer University

First round Round of 64; March 13
1	Pfeiffer	102
8	Indiana (PA)	91
4	California (PA)	59
5	Cheyney	74
3	West Virginia State	80
6	District of Columbia	69
2	Alderson Broaddus	85
7	Mount Olive	80

Regional semifinal Round of 32; March 14
1	Pfeiffer	121
5	Cheyney	101
3	West Virginia State	71
2	Alderson Broaddus	87

Regional final Sweet 16; March 16
1	Pfeiffer	106
2	Alderson Broaddus	77

=== South Atlantic - Kennesaw, Georgia ===
Location: KSU Convocation Center Host: Kennesaw State University

First round Round of 64; March 13
1	Kennesaw State	78
8	Catawba	63
4	Virginia Union	75
5	Columbus State	77
3	Bowie State	86
6	Lenoir–Rhyne	81
2	Francis Marion	86
7	Armstrong Atlantic State	84

Regional semifinal Round of 32; March 14
1	Kennesaw State	70
5	Columbus State	55
3	Bowie State	78
2	Francis Marion	95

Regional final Sweet 16; March 16
1	Kennesaw State	82
2	Francis Marion	73

=== Northeast - Lowell, Massachusetts ===
Location: Costello Gym Host: University of Massachusetts at Lowell

First round Round of 64; March 13
1	UMass-Lowell	74
8	Bridgeport	64
4	Southern New Hampshire	74
5	New Haven	67
3	Philadelphia	75
6	New York Tech	81
2	Long Island-C.W. Post	63
7	Bryant	65

Regional semifinal Round of 32; March 14
1	UMass-Lowell (OT)	67
4	Southern New Hampshire	61
6	New York Tech	60
7	Bryant	64

Regional final Sweet 16; March 16
1	UMass-Lowell	63
7	Bryant	62

=== West - San Bernardino, California ===
Location: Coussoulis Arena Host: California State University, San Bernardino

First round Round of 64; March 12
1	Cal State San Bernardino	92
8	Chico State	60
4	Cal State Bakersfield	82
5	Alaska–Fairbanks	91
3	Humboldt State	86
6	Cal Poly Pomona	83
2	BYU–Hawaii	67
7	Alaska-Anchorage	61

Regional semifinal Round of 32; March 13
1	Cal State San Bernardino	78
5	Alaska–Fairbanks (OT)	82
3	Humboldt State	71
2	BYU–Hawaii	61

Regional final Sweet 16; March 15
5	Alaska–Fairbanks	60
3	Humboldt State	64

== Elite Eight-Bakersfield, California ==
Location: Bakersfield Centennial Garden Host: California State University, Bakersfield

National Quarterfinals; Elite Eight; March 24
GL	Southern Indiana	88
S	Northwest Missouri State	81
NC	Metro State	88
S	Rollins	54
Bakersfield, California
SA	Kennesaw State	86
E	Pfeiffer	79
W	Humboldt State	89
NE	UMass Lowell	82

National semifinals Final Four; March 25
GL	Southern Indiana	83
NC	Metro State	81
SA	Kennesaw State	81
W	Humboldt State	67

National championship March 27
GL	Southern Indiana	59
SA	Kennesaw State	84

== All-tournament team ==
- Terrence Hill, Kennesaw State (MOP)
- Georgi Joseph, Kennesaw State
- Cris Brunson, Southern Indiana
- Joe Gordon, Southern Indiana
- Luke Kendall, Metro State

== See also ==
- 2004 NCAA Division II women's basketball tournament
- 2004 NCAA Division I men's basketball tournament
- 2004 NCAA Division III men's basketball tournament
- 2004 NAIA Division I men's basketball tournament
- 2004 NAIA Division II men's basketball tournament
