= Amir Abdur-Rahim =

American basketball player and coach (1981–2024)

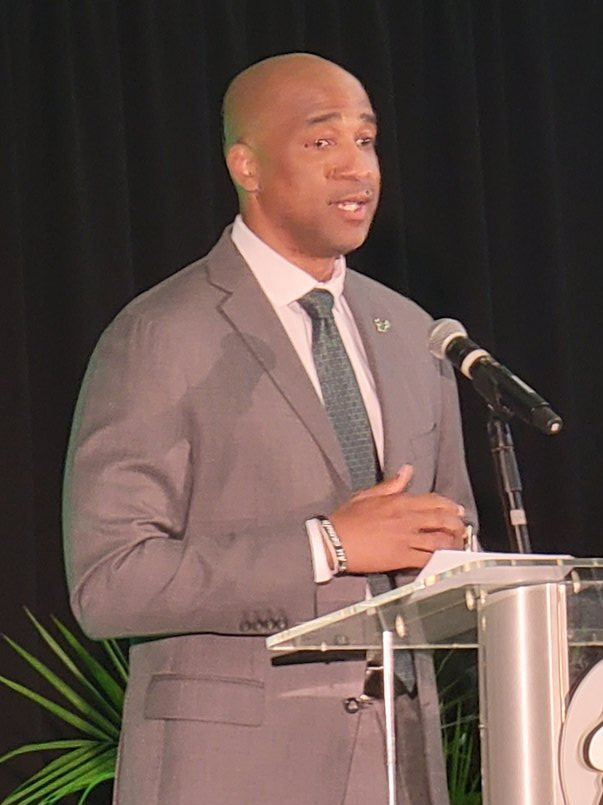
- Abdur-Rahim in 2023

Biographical details
- Born: March 18, 1981; Atlanta, Georgia, U.S.
- Died: October 24, 2024 (aged 43); Tampa, Florida, U.S.

Playing career
- 2000–2001: Garden City CC
- 2001–2004: Southeastern Louisiana

Coaching career (HC unless noted)
- 2006–2011: Murray State (assistant)
- 2012–2014: Charleston (assistant)
- 2014–2018: Texas A&M (assistant)
- 2018–2019: Georgia (assistant)
- 2019–2023: Kennesaw State
- 2023–2024: South Florida

Administrative career (AD unless noted)
- 2011–2012: Georgia Tech (dir. player development)

Head coaching record
- Overall: 70–82 (.461)
- Tournaments: 0–1 (NCAA Division I); 1–1 (NIT)

Accomplishments and honors

Championships
- ASUN regular season (2023); ASUN tournament (2023); AAC regular season (2024)

Awards
- Hugh Durham Award (2023); ASUN Coach of the Year (2023); 2× AAC Coach of the Year (2024, 2025 (Note: Abdur-Rahim was posthumously named the honorary 2025 AAC Men's Basketball Coach of the Year.)); USF Athletic Hall of Fame (2025)

Amir Abdur-Rahim (March 18, 1981 – October 24, 2024) was an American basketball coach and player who was the head coach of the South Florida Bulls men's basketball team. Prior to coaching at USF, he was the head coach at Kennesaw State from 2019 to 2023, leading the Owls to the 2023 conference regular season and tournament titles and their first-ever berth in the NCAA Division I men's basketball tournament.

== Playing career ==
Amir Abdur-Rahim played at Joseph Wheeler High School in Marietta, Georgia.

After one season at Garden City Community College, Abdur-Rahim transferred to Southeastern Louisiana where he was a three-time All-Southland Conference selection playing for Billy Kennedy. He graduated seventh all-time in career points and second all-time in three-pointers made and steals.

== Coaching career ==
Abdur-Rahim began coaching in 2006 serving as a graduate assistant at Murray State for two seasons under Kennedy before being promoted to a full-time assistant coach. He stayed with the Racers until 2011, when he joined the staff at Georgia Tech as the director of player development for one season before becoming an assistant coach at the College of Charleston in 2012. Abdur-Rahim reunited with Kennedy as an assistant coach at Texas A&M from 2014 to 2018 where he was on staff for two of the Aggies' Sweet 16 appearances. In 2018, he returned to his home state to join Tom Crean's staff at Georgia.

On April 18, 2019, Abdur-Rahim was named the head coach at Kennesaw State, replacing Al Skinner. In the 2022–23 season, Abdur-Rahim led Kennesaw State to their first winning season in their Division I program history, with a record of 26–9. The Owls also won their first Atlantic Sun title and went to their first NCAA Division I tournament. As a result, he was named the 2023 ASUN Coach of the Year.

On March 29, 2023, Abdur-Rahim was named the head coach of South Florida. He replaced Brian Gregory. He led the program to their first Top 25 ranking in both the AP and Coaches' Poll and their first American Athletic Conference regular season title, as the team finished 25–8, the best in school history. Abdur-Rahim was named a Naismith College Coach of the Year semifinalist, and a finalist for the Ben Jobe National Coach of the Year and the Jim Phelan National Coach of the Year.

== Personal life ==
Abdur-Rahim was born in Atlanta on March 18, 1981. His father William was an imam while his mother Deborah was a Christian special education teacher, and Amir was one of 13 siblings. His brother Shareef played 13 years in the NBA, and is the current president of the NBA G League. Shareef is the father of Jabri Abdur-Rahim and of USF volleyball player Sami Abdur-Rahim.

== Death and legacy ==
On October 24, 2024, Abdur-Rahim died at Tampa General Hospital at the age of 43, from complications that arose during a medical procedure related to an undisclosed illness. Following Abdur-Rahim's death, the student section in USF's Yuengling Center was named the "Amir Abdur-Rahim Student Section" and a permanent installation in the arena will be added as a tribute. The American Conference named Abdur-Rahim the honorary 2024–25 coach of the year and created the Amir Abdur-Rahim Sportsmanship Award, which "will be presented annually to the men’s basketball student-athlete who, as determined by the league's head coaches, best exemplifies the qualities of sportsmanship, fair play and leadership". Abdur-Rahim was posthumously inducted into the USF Athletic Hall of Fame in 2025.

Milton Overton, Director of Athletics for the Kennesaw State Owls, said on Abdur-Rahim's passing, "Amir Abdur-Rahim left a legacy not only at Kennesaw State, but throughout his life. Owl Nation will forever remember how he molded young men into champions on the court and in their lives."

In 2025, USF and Kennesaw State began playing each other in the Love Wins Classic.

== Head coaching record ==
Record table
| Season | Team | Overall | Conference | Standing | Postseason |
|---|---|---|---|---|---|
Kennesaw State Owls (ASUN Conference) (2019–2023)
| 2019–20 | Kennesaw State | 1–28 | 0–16 | 9th | |
| 2020–21 | Kennesaw State | 5–19 | 2–13 | 9th | |
| 2021–22 | Kennesaw State | 13–18 | 7–9 | T–4th (East) | |
| 2022–23 | Kennesaw State | 26–9 | 15–3 | T–1st | NCAA Division I Round of 64 |
| Kennesaw State: | | 45–74 (.378) | 24–41 (.369) | | |
South Florida Bulls (American Athletic Conference) (2023–2024)
| 2023–24 | South Florida | 25–8 | 16–2 | 1st | NIT Second Round |
| South Florida: | | 25–8 (.758) | 16–2 (.889) | | |
| Total: | | 70–82 (.461) | | | |
National champion Postseason invitational champion Conference regular season champion Conference regular season and conference tournament champion Division regular season champion Division regular season and conference tournament champion Conference tournament champion
