= Clayton State Lakers =

- University: Clayton State University
- Conference: Peach Belt
- NCAA: Division II
- Athletic director: Jermaine Rolle
- Location: Morrow, Georgia
- First season: 1989
- Varsity teams: 11 (5 men's, 5 women's, 1 co-ed)
- Basketball arena: Athletics & Fitness Center
- Soccer stadium: Laker Field
- Mascot: Loch
- Nickname: Lakers
- Colors: Blue and Georgia Clay
- Website: claytonstatesports.com
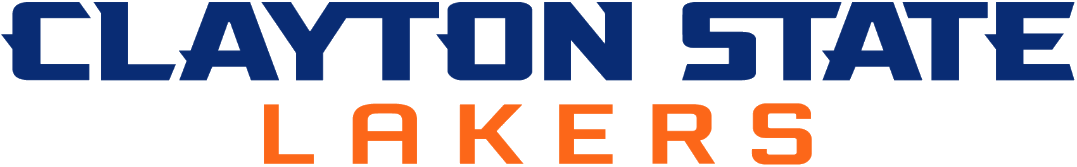

Team NCAA championships
- 1

The Clayton State Lakers are the athletic teams that represent Clayton State University, located in Morrow, Georgia, in intercollegiate sports at the Division II level of the National Collegiate Athletic Association (NCAA), primarily competing in the Peach Belt Conference since the 1995–96 academic year.

Clayton State competes in eleven intercollegiate varsity sports. Men's sports include basketball, cross country, soccer, and track and field (both indoor and outdoor); while women's sports include basketball, cross country, soccer, and track and field (both indoor and outdoor). The Lakers also field a cheerleading team. Women's tennis was discontinued at the end of the 2016–17 academic year. Men's golf followed suit after 2022–23.

== Conference affiliations ==
NCAA

- Peach Belt Conference (1995–present)

== Varsity teams ==
Men's sports	Women's sports
Basketball	Basketball
Cross country	Cross country
Soccer	Soccer
Track and field^{1}	Track and field^{1}
^{1} – includes both indoor and outdoor

== National championships ==
=== Team ===
Clayton State University won its first national championship in school history when the Lakers won the NCAA Division II women's basketball national title in 2011. It is still the only women's basketball championship won by a team from the Southeast Region.

Assoc.	Division	Sport	Year	Rival	Score
NCAA	Division II	Women's Basketball	2011	Michigan Tech	69–50

== Notable alumni ==
=== Men's basketball ===
- Kevin Young

=== Men's golf ===
- Will Wilcox

=== Men's soccer ===
- Chris Klute
- Janiel Simon

=== Women's soccer ===
- Manoly Baquerizo
- Jency Ramírez
- Pearl Slattery
