= Kennesaw State Owls men's basketball =

NCAA Division I program

Kennesaw State Owls
2026–27 Kennesaw State Owls men's basketball team
- University: Kennesaw State University
- Head coach: Antoine Pettway (4th season)
- Location: Kennesaw, Georgia
- Arena: KSU Convocation Center (capacity: 4,792)
- Conference: Conference USA
- Nickname: Owls
- Colors: Black and gold

NCAA Division I tournament champions
- 2004*
Other NCAA Division I tournament results
Final Four	2004*
Elite Eight	2004*
Sweet Sixteen	2004*
Appearances	2003*, 2004*, 2005*, 2023, 2026

Conference tournament champions
- 2004, 2023, 2026

Conference regular-season champions
- 2004, 2023
- * at Division II level

The Kennesaw State Owls men's basketball team represents Kennesaw State University, located in unincorporated Cobb County, Georgia, United States near the Atlanta suburb of Kennesaw. The school's team will start competition in Conference USA (CUSA) in 2024–25 after 19 seasons in the Atlantic Sun Conference. They are currently led by head coach Antoine Pettway and play their home games at the KSU Convocation Center. The Owls have appeared twice in the NCAA Division I men's basketball tournament, most recently in 2026.

During their time as a member of NCAA Division II, they were national champions in 2004. In 2023, led by head coach Amir Abdur-Rahim, they made their first ever appearance in the NCAA Division I tournament after winning their first ASUN championship.

Former four-year graduate guard Markeith Cummings (2009–13) is the team's all-time leading scorer with 2,048 career points, passing former leader Herman Smith (1986–90, 1,683 points) on November 18, 2012.

== Postseason ==
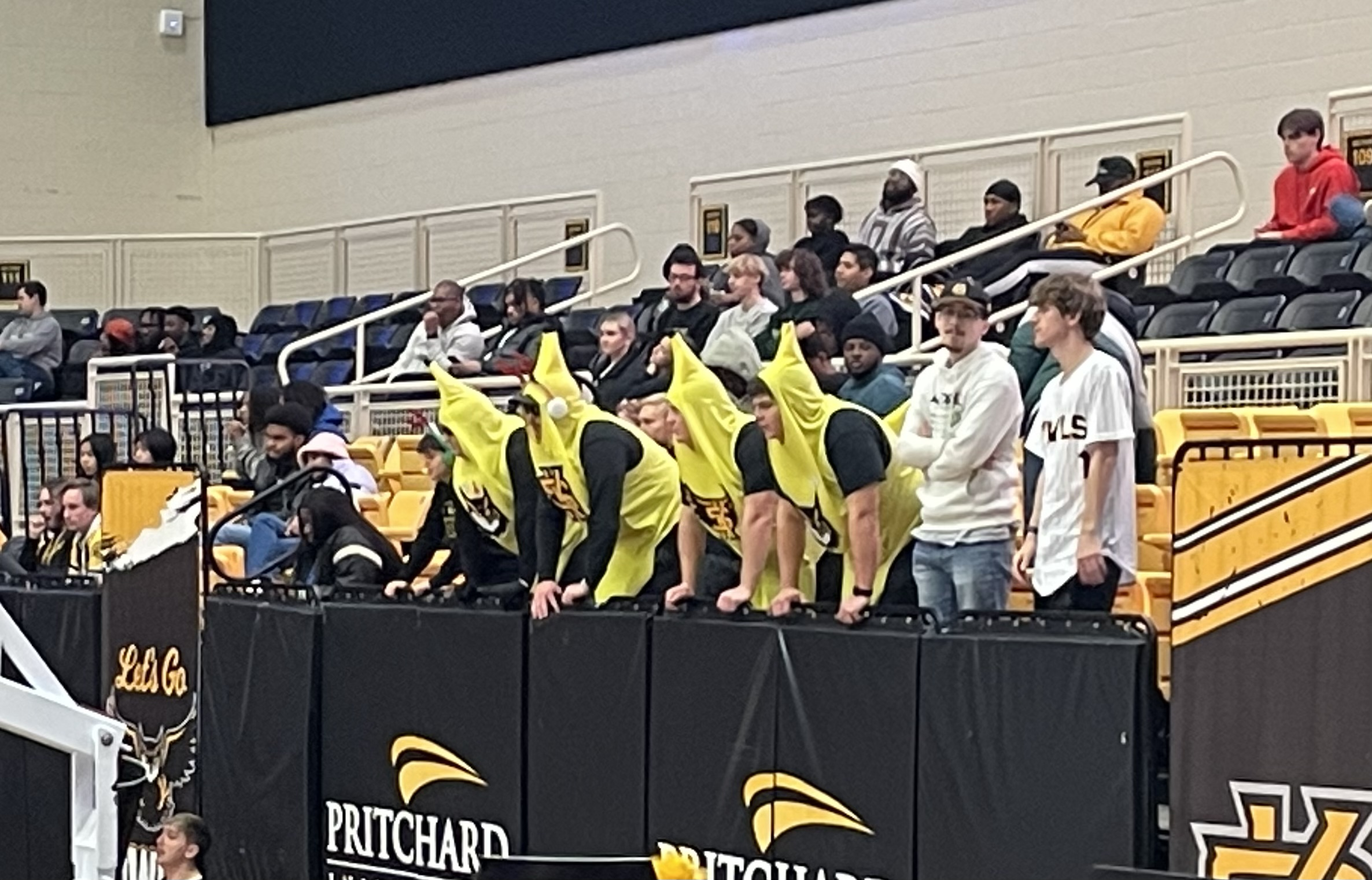
The KSU Bananas, who are the leaders of the Owl's student section

=== NCAA Division I Tournament ===
The Owls have made two appearances in the NCAA Division I tournament. Their record is 0–2.

Year	Seed	Round	Opponent	Result
2023	No. 14	First Round	No. 3 Xavier	L 67–72
2026	No. 14	First Round	No. 3 Gonzaga	L 64–73

=== NCAA Division II Tournament results ===
The Owls have appeared in three NCAA Division II tournaments. Their record is 7–2. They were national champions in 2004.

Year	Round	Opponent	Result
2003	Regional Quarterfinals; Regional semifinals	Virginia Union; Bowie State	W 74–65; L 70–95
2004	Regional Quarterfinals; Regional semifinals Regional Finals; Elite Eight; Final Four; National Championship Game	Catawba; Columbus State; Francis Marion; Pfieffer; Humboldt State; Southern Indiana	W 78–63; W 70–55; W 82–73; W 86–79; W 81–67; W 84–59
2005	Regional Quarterfinals	Columbus State	L 78–83 ^{OT}

=== NAIA Division I Tournament results ===
In their time in NAIA, the Owls appeared in one NAIA Division I Tournament. Their combined record was 0–1.

Year	Round	Opponent	Result
1993	First round	Hawaiʻi Pacific	L 71–92
