= 2026–27 Austin Peay Governors men's basketball team =

American college basketball season

2026–27 Austin Peay Governors men's basketball
- Conference: United Athletic Conference
- Record: 2–1 (0–0 UAC)
- Head coach: Corey Gipson (4th season)
- Associate head coach: Rodney Hamilton (4th season); Tim Ward (4th season)
- Assistant coach: Dugan Lyne (3rd season)
- Home arena: F&M Bank Arena (Capacity: 5,500)

2026–27 United Athletic Conference men's basketball standings
	Conf.				Overall
Team	W		L	PCT	W		L	PCT
Eastern Kentucky	0	–	0	–	4	–	1	.800
Tarleton State	0	–	0	–	4	–	1	.800
UT Arlington	0	–	0	–	4	–	1	.800
North Alabama	0	–	0	–	3	–	2	.600
Austin Peay	0	–	0	–	2	–	2	.500
Central Arkansas	0	–	0	–	2	–	3	.400
Abilene Christian	0	–	0	–	1	–	3	.250
Little Rock	0	–	0	–	1	–	3	.250
West Georgia*	0	–	0	–	0	–	3	.000
† 2027 UAC tournament winner * ineligible for the 2027 NCAA tournament due to transition from Division II; As of November 17, 2026

The 2026–27 Austin Peay Governors men's basketball team represents Austin Peay State University during the 2026–27 NCAA Division I men's basketball season. The Governors are led by fourth-year head coach A. W. Hamilton and play their home games at F&M Bank Arena in Clarksville, Tennessee as a member of the United Athletic Conference. This will also mark Austin Peay's first season as members of the United Athletic Conference after spending the previous four seasons as members of the Atlantic Sun Conference.

== Previous season ==
Tarleton State finished the 2025-26 season 22–9, 15–3 in the Atlantic Sun Conference to finish tied for first in the conference. As the 2-seed in the ASUN Tournament the Governors defeated 10-seed Stetson in the First round before falling to 10-seed Queens 83–90 in the Semifinals to end their season.

=== Departures ===
Austin Peay Governors departures
Name	Number	Pos.	Height	Weight	Year	Hometown	Reason for departure
Tate McCubbin	0	G/F	6'8"	174	Sophomore	Columbia, MO	Transferred to Northern Iowa
Tyler Wagner	2	G	6'5"	197	Freshman	Brooklyn Park, MN	Transferred to North Dakota
Matt Enright	3	G	6'2"	179	Senior	St. Louis, MO	Out of eligibility
Creighton Morisch	7	F	6'10"	229	Graduate	Spirit Lake, IA	Out of eligibility
Terrell Gaines	10	G	5'8"	155	Sophomore	West Plains, MO	Transferred to Missouri State-West Plains
Anton Brookshire	12	G	6'2"	174	(redshirt) Senior	Milwaukee, WI	Out of eligibility
Quan Lax	20	G	6'2"	188	(redshirt) Senior	Bolivar, TN	Transferred to North Alabama
Travis Torain	22	G/F	6'8"	203	Sophomore	Surprise, AZ	Transferred to Fairleigh Dickinson
Ja'Corey Robinson	23	G	6'6"	211	Freshman	Topeka, KS	Transferred to Radford
Hansel Enmanuel	24	G	6'6"	185	Senior	Los Mina, Dominican Republic	Out of eligibility
Collin Parker	32	F	6'8"	227	Graduate	Montgomery City, MO	Out of eligibility

=== Incoming transfers ===
Austin Peay Governors incoming transfers
Name	Number	Pos.	Height	Weight	Year	Hometown	Previous School
Shamarrie Hugie	9	G	6'6"	180	Senior	Savannah, GA	Marshall
Chuck Love III	10	G	6'7"	191	Sophomore	Lincoln, NE	Loyola Chicago

=== 2026 recruiting class ===
College recruiting
Name	Hometown	School	Height	Weight	Commit date
Donovan Bolden; PF/C	San Antonio, TX	Earl Warren HS	6 ft 10 in (2.08 m)	200 lb (91 kg)	Aug 12, 2026
Donovan Bolden; PF/C	Recruit ratings: (NR)				
Alex Davis; PF	Orlando, FL	Southeastern Prep	6 ft 8 in (2.03 m)	240 lb (110 kg)	Mar 28, 2026
Alex Davis; PF	Recruit ratings: 247Sports: On3: (NR)				
Birkir Eythorsson; SG/SF	Daytona Beach, FL	DME Academy	6 ft 8 in (2.03 m)	204 lb (93 kg)	May 15, 2026
Birkir Eythorsson; SG/SF	Recruit ratings: (NR)				
Bradley Floyd; CG	Winston-Salem, NC	Winston Salem Christian School	6 ft 5 in (1.96 m)	185 lb (84 kg)	Nov 7, 2025
Bradley Floyd; CG	Recruit ratings: 247Sports: On3: (NR)				
Felipe Minzer; PG/SF	Orlando, FL	The Academy of Central Florida	6 ft 5 in (1.96 m)	195 lb (88 kg)	Apr 10, 2026
Felipe Minzer; PG/SF	Recruit ratings: 247Sports: (NR)				
Cam Ryans; SG/SF	Grand Rapids, MI	Northview HS	6 ft 5 in (1.96 m)	195 lb (88 kg)	Apr 25, 2026
Cam Ryans; SG/SF	Recruit ratings: 247Sports: On3: (NR)				
PJ Singleton; SG/SF	Brooklyn, NY	Canarsie HS	6 ft 6 in (1.98 m)	220 lb (100 kg)	Oct 30, 2025
PJ Singleton; SG/SF	Recruit ratings: 247Sports: (NR)				
Talon Todd; PG	San Antonio, TX	William J. Brennan HS	6 ft 0 in (1.83 m)	160 lb (73 kg)	Jun 4, 2025
Talon Todd; PG	Recruit ratings: 247Sports: On3: (NR)				
Overall recruit ranking: Scout: – Rivals: –
Note: In many cases, Scout, Rivals, 247Sports, On3, and ESPN may conflict in their listings of height and weight.; In these cases, the average was taken. ESPN grades are on a 100-point scale.; Sources: "2026 Austin Peay Basketball Recruiting Commits". Scout.; "Scout.com Team Recruiting Rankings". Scout.; "2026 Team Ranking". Rivals.

== Roster ==
2026–27 Austin Peay Governors men's basketball team
Players
Coaches

Pos.	#	Name	Height	Weight	Year	Previous school	Hometown
G	0	Cam Ryans	6 ft 5 in (1.96 m)	206 lb (93 kg)	Fr	Northview HS	Grand Rapids, Michigan
G	1	Zyree Collins	6 ft 0 in (1.83 m)	187 lb (85 kg)	So	St. Mary's South Side Catholic HS	St. Louis, Missouri
F	2	Donovan Bolden	6 ft 10 in (2.08 m)	200 lb (91 kg)	Fr	Earl Warren HS	San Antonio, Texas
G	3	PJ Singleton	6 ft 6 in (1.98 m)	220 lb (100 kg)	Fr	Canarsie HS	Brooklyn, New York
G	4	Talon Todd	6 ft 0 in (1.83 m)	165 lb (75 kg)	Fr	William J. Brennan HS	San Antonio, Texas
F	5	Rashaud Marshall	6 ft 8 in (2.03 m)	245 lb (111 kg)	Sr	Arkansas State	Blytheville, Arkansas
G	8	Bradley Floyd	6 ft 5 in (1.96 m)	202 lb (92 kg)	Fr	Winston Salem Christian School	Kings Mountain, North Carolina
G	9	Shamarrie Hugie	6 ft 6 in (1.98 m)	180 lb (82 kg)	Sr	Marshall	Savannah, Georgia
G	10	Chuck Love III	6 ft 7 in (2.01 m)	191 lb (87 kg)	So	Loyola Chicago	Lincoln, Nebraska
G	11	Felipe Minzer	6 ft 7 in (2.01 m)	221 lb (100 kg)	Fr	The Academy of Central Florida	Gálvez, Argentina
F	20	Alex Davis	6 ft 9 in (2.06 m)	235 lb (107 kg)	Fr	Southeastern Prep	Daytona Beach, Florida
G	25	Birkir Eythorsson	6 ft 8 in (2.03 m)	204 lb (93 kg)	Fr	DME Academy	Selfoss, Iceland

Head coach

- Corey Gipson (Austin Peay)

Assistant coach(es)

- Rodney Hamilton (Georgia State)
- Tim Ward (Central Methodist)
- Dugan Lyne (Austin Peay)

Legend

- (C) Team captain
- (S) Suspended
- (I) Ineligible
- (W) Walk-on
- Injured
- Current redshirt

Roster

== Schedule and results ==
Date time, TV	Rank^{#}	Opponent^{#}	Result	Record	High points	High rebounds	High assists	Site (attendance) city, state
Exhibition
October 11, 2026*; 3:00 p.m.		Evansville	W 79–74		17 – Marshall	8 – Minzer	7 – Minzer	F&M Bank Arena; Clarksville, TN
October 27, 2026*; 7:00 p.m.		IU Indy	W 96–94		32 – Collins	14 – Marshall	9 – Minzer	F&M Bank Arena (1,104); Clarksville, TN
Non-conference regular season
November 2, 2026*; 7:00 p.m., ESPN+		Lane	W 109–65	1–0	18 – Collins	8 – Tied	7 – Minzer	F&M Bank Arena (1,446); Clarksville, TN
November 6, 2026*; 6:00 p.m., ESPN+		at Kennesaw State	L 69–71	1–1	23 – Collins	7 – Davis	4 – Collins	VyStar Arena (1,312); Kennesaw, GA
November 10, 2026*; 7:00 p.m., ESPN+		Livingstone	W 82–61	2–1	15 – Ryans	11 – Collins	9 – Collins	F&M Bank Arena (1,432); Clarksville, TN
November 14, 2026*; 6:00 p.m., ESPN+		at Wichita State						Charles Koch Arena; Wichita, KS
November 17, 2026*; 7:00 p.m., ESPN+		Life						F&M Bank Arena; Clarksville, TN
November 21, 2026*; 2:00 p.m., ESPN+		UT Rio Grande Valley						F&M Bank Arena; Clarksville, TN
November 28, 2026*; 5:30 p.m., ESPN+		at Furman						Timmons Arena; Greenville, SC
December 2, 2026*; 8:00 p.m., MW+		at Wyoming						Arena-Auditorium; Laramie, WY
December 5, 2026*; 4:30 p.m., ESPN+		Kennesaw State						F&M Bank Arena; Clarksville, TN
December 10, 2026*; 7:00 p.m., ESPN+		Air Force						F&M Bank Arena; Clarksville, TN
December 15, 2026*; 9:00 p.m., ESPN+		at Seattle U						Redhawk Center; Seattle, WA
December 19, 2026*; 2:00 p.m., ESPN+		Bellarmine; ASUN-UAC Crossover						F&M Bank Arena; Clarksville, TN
December 21, 2026*; 7:00 p.m., ESPN+		Lipscomb; ASUN-UAC Crossover						F&M Bank Arena; Clarksville, TN
December 28, 2026*; 7:00 p.m., ESPN+		UT Southern						F&M Bank Arena; Clarksville, TN
December 31, 2026*; 1:00 p.m., ESPN+		at Queens; ASUN-UAC Crossover						Curry Arena; Charlotte, NC
January 2, 2027*; 1:00 p.m., ESPN+		at West Florida; ASUN-UAC Crossover						PenAir Field House; Pensacola, FL
UAC regular season
January 6, 2027; 7:30 p.m., ESPN+		Eastern Kentucky						F&M Bank Arena; Clarksville, TN
January 9, 2027; 5:00 p.m., ESPN+		at North Alabama						CB&S Bank Arena; Florence, AL
January 13, 2027; 7:00 p.m., ESPN+		at UT Arlington						College Park Center; Arlington, TX
January 16, 2027; 4:30 p.m., ESPN+		Tarleton State						F&M Bank Arena; Clarksville, TN
January 20, 2027; 7:00 p.m., ESPN+		Central Arkansas						F&M Bank Arena; Clarksville, TN
January 27, 2027; 7:00 p.m., ESPN+		Abilene Christian						Moody Coliseum; Abilene, TX
January 30, 2027; 4:00 p.m., ESPN+		at Tarleton State						EECU Center; Stephenville, TX
February 3, 2027; 7:30 p.m., ESPN+		Little Rock						F&M Bank Arena; Clarksville, TN
February 6, 2027; 7:30 p.m., ESPN+		UT Arlington						F&M Bank Arena; Clarksville, TN
February 10, 2027; 7:30 p.m., ESPN+		at Abilene Christian						F&M Bank Arena; Clarksville, TN
February 13, 2027; 1:00 p.m., ESPN+		at West Georgia						The Coliseum; Carrollton, GA
February 17, 2027; 6:00 p.m., ESPN+		at Eastern Kentucky						Baptist Health Arena; Richmond, KY
February 24, 2027; 7:00 p.m., ESPN+		West Georgia						F&M Bank Arena; Clarksville, TN
February 27, 2027; 4:00 p.m., ESPN+		North Alabama						F&M Bank Arena; Clarksville, TN
March 3, 2027; 7:00 p.m., ESPN+		at Little Rock						Jack Stephens Center; Little Rock, AR
March 6, 2027; 3:30 p.m., ESPN+		at Central Arkansas						Farris Center; Conway, AR
UAC tournament
March 10, 2027; TBD, TBD		vs. TBD						Credit Union of Texas Event Center; Allen, TX
*Non-conference game. ^{#}Rankings from AP Poll. (#) Tournament seedings in parentheses. All times are in Central Time.
