= 2026–27 Little Rock Trojans men's basketball team =

American college basketball season

2026–27 Little Rock Trojans men's basketball
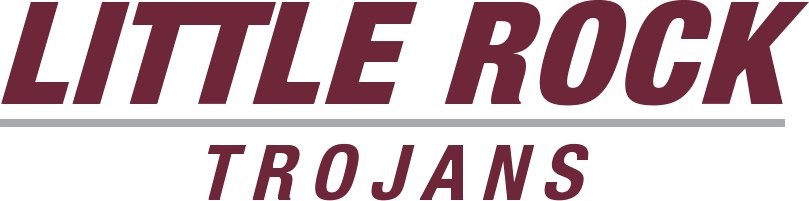
- Conference: United Athletic Conference
- Record: 1–3 (0–0 UAC)
- Head coach: Travis Ford (1st season)
- Associate head coach: Von Macon (1st season)
- Assistant coaches: Christian Nunez (1st season); Jordon Kedrowski (1st season); Ted Crass (1st season); Tyler Milchman (1st season)
- Home arena: Jack Stephens Center (Capacity: 5,600)

2026–27 United Athletic Conference men's basketball standings
	Conf.				Overall
Team	W		L	PCT	W		L	PCT
Eastern Kentucky	0	–	0	–	4	–	1	.800
Tarleton State	0	–	0	–	4	–	1	.800
UT Arlington	0	–	0	–	4	–	1	.800
North Alabama	0	–	0	–	3	–	2	.600
Austin Peay	0	–	0	–	2	–	2	.500
Central Arkansas	0	–	0	–	2	–	3	.400
Abilene Christian	0	–	0	–	1	–	3	.250
Little Rock	0	–	0	–	1	–	3	.250
West Georgia*	0	–	0	–	0	–	3	.000
† 2027 UAC tournament winner * ineligible for the 2027 NCAA tournament due to transition from Division II; As of November 17, 2026

The 2026–27 Little Rock Trojans men's basketball team represents the University of Arkansas at Little Rock during the 2026–27 NCAA Division I men's basketball season. The Trojans are led by first-year head coach Travis Ford and play their home games at Jack Stephens Center in Little Rock, Arkansas as a member of the United Athletic Conference. This will also mark Little Rock's first season as members of the United Athletic Conference after spending the previous four seasons as members of the Ohio Valley Conference.

== Previous season ==
Little Rock finished the 2025-26 season 12–20, 9–11 in the Ohio Valley Conference to finish seventh in the conference. As the 7-seed in the OVC Tournament the Trojans were defeated by 6-seed Lindenwood in the First round 62–72 to end their season. Two days after the conclusion of the season on March 6, the Trojans announced that head coach Darrell Walker would not be retained. On March 19 the Trojans hired Travis Ford as the program's new head coach.

=== Departures ===
Little Rock Trojans departures
Name	Number	Pos.	Height	Weight	Year	Hometown	Reason for departure
Braxton Bayless	0	G	6'2"	175	Graduate	Ankeny, IA	Out of eligibility
Joseph Thomas	1	G	6'3"	165	(redshirt) Freshman	Portal, GA	Entered transfer portal
KK Robinson	2	G	6'0"	180	Graduate	Little Rock, AR	Transferred to New Mexico State
Khasen Robinson	3	G	6'1"	186	(redshirt) Sophomore	Little Rock, AR	Transferred to Arkansas Tech
Kellen Robinson	4	G	6'3"	185	Freshman	Little Rock, AR	Transferred to Lindenwood
Christian Hughes	5	G	6'2"	180	(redshirt) Sophomore	Kirkwood, MO	Transferred to Drury
Travonne Jackson	8	G	6'8"	195	(redshirt) Sophomore	Columbus, OH	Entered transfer portal
Caleb Pennyfeather	10	F	6'9"	196	Sophomore	Orlando, FL	Transferred to Cleary
Johnathan Lawson	11	G	6'7"	190	(redshirt) Senior	Memphis, TN	Out of eligibility
Tracy Steele Jr.	12	G	6'3"	175	Graduate	North Little Rock, AR	Out of eligibility
Kachi Nzeh	15	F	6'8"	225	Junior	Upper Darby, PA	Transferred to Delaware
Truman Claytor IV	22	F	6'6"	215	Junior	Toledo, OH	Transferred to Georgia Southern
Cameron Wallace	24	F	6'8"	210	Junior	Little Rock, AR	Transferred to Southern Miss
Tuongthach Gatkek	32	F	6'9"	187	Graduate	Portland, ME	Out of eligibility

=== Incoming transfers ===
Little Rock Trojans incoming transfers
Name	Number	Pos.	Height	Weight	Year	Hometown	Previous School
Tyrese Lacey	0	G	5'9"	145	Junior	Birmingham, United Kingdom	Daytona State College
Jalen Lyn	1	G	6'4"	190	Junior	Queens, NY	College of Southern Idaho
Jah'Likai King	2	G	6'2"	175	Senior	Newburgh, NY	UMBC
Aaron Clark	3	G	6'5"	190	(redshirt) Junior	Easton, PA	Pepperdine
Papa Amadou Kante	5	F	6'10"	235	(redshirt) Junior	Dakar, Senegal	Pittsburgh
Taj Walters	6	G	6'9"	220	Sophomore	Bronx, NY	Northern Illinois
Jamai Felt	7	F	6'9"	200	(redshirt) Junior	Boston, MA	Bowling Green
Cameron Brown	8	G	6'6"	185	Sophomore	Memphis, TN	Ranger College
AJ Economou	11	G	6'5"	180	Junior	Santa Monica, CA	Hawaii
Ayomide Bamisile	23	F	6'7"	206	(redshirt) Junior	Lagos, Nigeria	Louisiana-Monroe
Roee Oselka	31	F	6'10"	220	Junior	Givatayim, Israel	Howard College
Bradyn Hubbard	51	F	6'5"	235	Graduate	Tulsa, OK	Abilene Christian

=== 2026 recruiting class ===
College recruiting
Name	Hometown	School	Height	Weight	Commit date
Micah Moore; PG	Little Rock, AR	Hall STEAM Magnet HS	5 ft 10 in (1.78 m)	165 lb (75 kg)	Nov 11, 2025
Micah Moore; PG	Recruit ratings: (NR)				
Jakari Smith; CG	Milwaukee, WI	Bradley Tech HS	6 ft 6 in (1.98 m)	210 lb (95 kg)	Apr 6, 2026
Jakari Smith; CG	Recruit ratings: (NR)				
Jonas Thurman; CG	Los Angeles, CA	SoCal Academy	6 ft 5 in (1.96 m)	180 lb (82 kg)	Apr 15, 2026
Jonas Thurman; CG	Recruit ratings: (NR)				
Overall recruit ranking: Scout: – Rivals: –
Note: In many cases, Scout, Rivals, 247Sports, On3, and ESPN may conflict in their listings of height and weight.; In these cases, the average was taken. ESPN grades are on a 100-point scale.; Sources: "2026 Little Rock Basketball Recruiting Commits". Scout.; "Scout.com Team Recruiting Rankings". Scout.; "2026 Team Ranking". Rivals.

== Roster ==
2026–27 Little Rock Trojans men's basketball team
Players
Coaches

Pos.	#	Name	Height	Weight	Year	Previous school	Hometown
G	0	Tyrese Lacey	5 ft 9 in (1.75 m)	145 lb (66 kg)	Jr	Daytona State College	Birmingham, United Kingdom
G	1	Jalen Lyn	6 ft 4 in (1.93 m)	190 lb (86 kg)	Jr	College of Southern Idaho	Queens, New York
G	2	Jah'Likai King	6 ft 2 in (1.88 m)	175 lb (79 kg)	Sr	UMBC	Newburgh, New York
G	3	Aaron Clark	6 ft 5 in (1.96 m)	190 lb (86 kg)	RS Jr	Pepperdine	Easton, Pennsylvania
F	5	Papa Amadou Kante	6 ft 10 in (2.08 m)	235 lb (107 kg)	RS Jr	Pittsburgh	Dakar, Senegal
G	6	Taj Walters	6 ft 5 in (1.96 m)	220 lb (100 kg)	So	Northern Illinois	Bronx, New York
F	7	Jamai Felt	6 ft 9 in (2.06 m)	200 lb (91 kg)	RS Jr	Bowling Green	Boston, Massachusetts
G	8	Cameron Brown	6 ft 6 in (1.98 m)	185 lb (84 kg)	So	Ranger College	Memphis, Tennessee
G	9	Jonas Thurman	6 ft 5 in (1.96 m)	180 lb (82 kg)	Fr	SoCal Academy	Los Angeles, California
F	10	Terrion Burgess	6 ft 9 in (2.06 m)	200 lb (91 kg)	So	Benton HS	Benton, Arkansas
G	11	AJ Economou	6 ft 5 in (1.96 m)	180 lb (82 kg)	Jr	Hawaii	Santa Monica, California
G	12	Micah Moore	5 ft 10 in (1.78 m)	165 lb (75 kg)	Fr	Hall STEAM Magnet HS	Little Rock, Arkansas
G	15	Jakari Smith	6 ft 6 in (1.98 m)	210 lb (95 kg)	Fr	Bradley Tech HS	Milwaukee, Wisconsin
F	23	Ayomide Bamisile	6 ft 7 in (2.01 m)	206 lb (93 kg)	RS Jr	Louisiana–Monroe	Lagos, Nigeria
F	31	Roee Oselka	6 ft 10 in (2.08 m)	220 lb (100 kg)	Jr	Howard College	Givatayim, Israel
F	51	Bradyn Hubbard	6 ft 5 in (1.96 m)	235 lb (107 kg)	GS	Abilene Christian	Tulsa, Oklahoma

Head coach

- Travis Ford (Kentucky)

Assistant coach(es)

- Van Macon (Southampton College)
- Christian Nunez (Farmingdale State)
- Jordon Kedrowski (Carthage College)
- Ted Crass (Little Rock)
- Tyler Milchman (West Virginia)

Legend

- (C) Team captain
- (S) Suspended
- (I) Ineligible
- (W) Walk-on
- Injured
- Current redshirt

Roster

== Schedule and results ==
Date time, TV	Rank^{#}	Opponent^{#}	Result	Record	High points	High rebounds	High assists	Site (attendance) city, state
Exhibition
October 16, 2026*; 6:00 p.m.		at Kentucky	L 49–69		13 – King	6 – Kante	4 – Lyn	Rupp Arena (18,955); Lexington, KY
October 28, 2026*; 7:00 p.m.		Arkansas-Pine Bluff	W 82–57		15 – Brown	14 – Tied	–	Jack Stephens Center (2,684); Little Rock, AR
Non-conference regular season
November 2, 2026*; 6:00 p.m., ESPN+		at VCU	L 72–82	0–1	27 – King	8 – Walters	2 – Tied	Siegel Center (7,637); Richmond, VA
November 7, 2026*; 7:00 p.m., ESPN+		Southeastern Louisiana	L 79–83	0–2	16 – Hubbard	7 – Tied	4 – Lyn	Jack Stephens Center (2,085); Little Rock, AR
November 10, 2026*; 8:00 p.m., MW+		at New Mexico	L 69–94	0–3	17 – Hubbard	6 – Hubbard	4 – Lyn	The Pit (11,078); Albuquerque, NM
November 14, 2026*; 7:00 p.m., ESPN+		Northwestern State	W 84–83 ^{OT}	1–3	18 – King	11 – Hubbard	6 – Lacey	Jack Stephens Center (1,027); Little Rock, AR
November 19, 2026*; 6:00 p.m., ESPN+		at Jacksonville; ASUN-UAC Crossover						Swisher Gymnasium; Jacksonville, FL
November 21, 2026*; 1:00 p.m., ESPN+		at North Florida; ASUN-UAC Crossover						UNF Arena; Jacksonville, FL
November 24, 2026*; 7:00 p.m., ESPN+		Arkansas Baptist						Jack Stephens Center; Little Rock, AR
November 27, 2026*; 7:00 p.m., ESPN+		Lane						Jack Stephens Center; Little Rock, AR
December 1, 2026*; 6:00 p.m., ESPN+		at Jacksonville State						Pete Mathews Coliseum; Jacksonville, AL
December 6, 2026*; 2:00 p.m., ESPN+		at Arkansas State						First National Bank Arena; Jonesboro, AR
December 12, 2026*; 7:00 p.m., ESPN+		Southern Illinois						Jack Stephens Center; Little Rock, AR
December 15, 2026*; 7:00 p.m., ESPN+		Milwaukee						Jack Stephens Center; Little Rock, AR
December 18, 2026*; 9:00 p.m., ESPN+		at Kansas State						Bramlage Coliseum; Manhattan, KS
December 22, 2026*; 7:00 p.m., ESPN+		at Memphis						FedExForum; Memphis, TN
December 30, 2026*; 7:00 p.m., ESPN+		Stetson; ASUN-UAC Crossover						Jack Stephens Center; Little Rock, AR
January 2, 2027*; 7:00 p.m., ESPN+		Florida Gulf Coast; ASUN-UAC Crossover						Jack Stephens Center; Little Rock, AR
UAC regular season
January 6, 2027; 7:00 p.m., ESPN+		Abilene Christian						Moody Coliseum; Abilene, TX
January 9, 2027; 4:15 p.m., ESPN+		at Tarleton State						EECU Center; Stephenville, TX
January 13, 2027; 7:00 p.m., ESPN+		West Georgia						Jack Stephens Center; Little Rock, AR
January 20, 2027; 7:00 p.m., ESPN+		Eastern Kentucky						Jack Stephens Center; Little Rock, AR
January 23, 2027; 7:00 p.m., ESPN+		Tarleton State						Jack Stephens Center; Little Rock, AR
January 27, 2027; 7:00 p.m., ESPN+		at UT Arlington						College Park Center; Arlington, TX
January 30, 2027; 7:00 p.m., ESPN+		North Alabama						Jack Stephens Center; Little Rock, AR
February 3, 2027; 7:30 p.m., ESPN+		at Austin Peay						F&M Bank Arena; Clarksville, TN
February 6, 2027; 7:00 p.m., ESPN+		Central Arkansas; Governor's I-40 Showdown						Jack Stephens Center; Little Rock, AR
February 10, 2027; 7:00 p.m., ESPN+		at West Georgia						The Coliseum; Carrollton, GA
February 13, 2027; 6:00 p.m., ESPN+		at North Alabama						CB&S Bank Arena; Florence, AL
February 20, 2027; 1:00 p.m., ESPN+		at Central Arkansas; Governor's I-40 Showdown						Farris Center; Conway, AR
February 24, 2027; 7:00 p.m., ESPN+		UT Arlington						Jack Stephens Center; Little Rock, AR
February 27, 2027; 3:00 p.m., ESPN+		at Eastern Kentucky						Baptist Health Arena; Richmond, KY
March 3, 2027; 7:00 p.m., ESPN+		at Austin Peay						Jack Stephens Center; Little Rock, AR
March 6, 2027; 7:00 p.m., ESPN+		at Abilene Christian						Jack Stephens Center; Little Rock, AR
UAC tournament
March 10, 2027; TBD, TBD		vs. TBD						Credit Union of Texas Event Center; Allen, TX
*Non-conference game. ^{#}Rankings from AP Poll. (#) Tournament seedings in parentheses. All times are in Central Time.
