= 2026–27 West Georgia Wolves men's basketball team =

American college basketball season

2026–27 West Georgia Wolves men's basketball
- Conference: United Athletic Conference
- Record: 0–2 (0–0 UAC)
- Head coach: Dave Moore (9th season)
- Assistant coaches: Andy Young (20th season); Mark Schult (4th season); Willie Evans (3rd season); Chase Crawford (1st season)
- Home arena: The Coliseum (Capacity: 6,469)

2026–27 United Athletic Conference men's basketball standings
	Conf.				Overall
Team	W		L	PCT	W		L	PCT
Eastern Kentucky	0	–	0	–	4	–	1	.800
Tarleton State	0	–	0	–	4	–	1	.800
UT Arlington	0	–	0	–	4	–	1	.800
North Alabama	0	–	0	–	3	–	2	.600
Austin Peay	0	–	0	–	2	–	2	.500
Central Arkansas	0	–	0	–	2	–	3	.400
Abilene Christian	0	–	0	–	1	–	3	.250
Little Rock	0	–	0	–	1	–	3	.250
West Georgia*	0	–	0	–	0	–	3	.000
† 2027 UAC tournament winner * ineligible for the 2027 NCAA tournament due to transition from Division II; As of November 17, 2026

The 2026–27 West Georgia Wolves men's basketball team represents the University of West Georgia during the 2026–27 NCAA Division I men's basketball season. The Wolves are led by ninth-year head coach Dave Moore and play their home games at The Coliseum in Carrollton, Georgia as a member of the United Athletic Conference. This season marks West Georgia's third year of a three-year transition period from Division II to Division I. As a result, the Wolves are not currently eligible to participate in the NCAA tournament until the 2027–28 season. This will also mark West Georgia's first season as members of the United Athletic Conference after spending the previous two seasons as members of the Atlantic Sun Conference.

== Previous season ==
West Georgia finished the 2025-26 season 15–17, 8–10 in the Atlantic Sun Conference to finish tied for fifth in the conference. As the 6-seed in the ASUN Tournament the Wolves defeated 11-seed North Florida in the First round before falling to 3-seed Queens in the Quarterfinals 63–71 to end their season.

=== Departures ===
West Georgia Wolves departures
Name	Number	Pos.	Height	Weight	Year	Hometown	Reason for departure
Brady Hardewig	1	G	6'2"	170	(redshirt) Sophomore	Cincinnati, OH	Transferred to Fairmont State
Shelton Williams-Dryden	4	F	6'6"	180	Senior	Milwaukee, WI	Entered transfer portal
JaVar Daniel	5	G/F	6'10"	200	Junior	Memphis, TN	Transferred to Tarleton State
Matija Žužić	6	G	6'7"	195	Senior	Belgrade, Serbia	Out of eligibility
Josh Smith	10	G	6'3"	200	Junior	Chicago, IL	Transferred to Duquesne
Kolten Griffin	11	G/F	6'6"	200	Senior	St. Joseph, MO	Out of eligibility
Eric Baldassarre	12	G	6'4"	180	(redshirt) Freshman	Lancaster, PA	Transferred to West Chester
Nate Jones	14	G	6'2"	180	Graduate	Carrollton, GA	Out of eligibility
Malcolm Noel	23	G	5'11"	190	Senior	Atlanta, GA	Out of eligibility
Maddox Fowles	25	F	6'7"	210	Freshman	Miami Gardens, FL	Entered transfer portal

=== Incoming transfers ===
West Georgia Wolves incoming transfers
Name	Number	Pos.	Height	Weight	Year	Hometown	Previous School
Juaquin Dixon	1	G	6'4"	184	Junior	Chicago, IL	Malcolm X College
David Simon	4	F	6'11"	208	(redshirt) Sophomore	Windsor, ON, Canada	Vermont
Amir Williams	12	G	6'7"	213	Junior	Newark, DE	Hofstra
Justin Redmond	13	G	6'2"	177	Junior	Snellville, GA	Northwestern State
Sam Maynard	14	F	6'6"	212	(redshirt) Sophomore	Alpharetta, GA	Young Harris
Marshal Destremau	21	F	6'9"	240	(redshirt) Senior	Perth, Australia	Southern Utah
Lou Hutchinson	24	G/F	6'7"	192	(redshirt) Senior	Upper Marlboro, MD	Alabama A&M
Aleix Sempere	32	F	6'8"	221	Junior	Barcelona, Spain	Iowa Central CC

=== 2026 recruiting class ===
College recruiting
Name	Hometown	School	Height	Weight	Commit date
TJ Farrington; PG	Washington, DC	Gonzaga College HS	5 ft 9 in (1.75 m)	157 lb (71 kg)	Jun 15, 2026
TJ Farrington; PG	Recruit ratings: (NR)				
Jaylin Sweat; SG/SF	Hinesville, GA	Bradwell Institute	6 ft 6 in (1.98 m)	208 lb (94 kg)	Dec 10, 2025
Jaylin Sweat; SG/SF	Recruit ratings: (NR)				
Overall recruit ranking: Scout: – Rivals: –
Note: In many cases, Scout, Rivals, 247Sports, On3, and ESPN may conflict in their listings of height and weight.; In these cases, the average was taken. ESPN grades are on a 100-point scale.; Sources: "2026 West Georgia Basketball Recruiting Commits". Scout.; "Scout.com Team Recruiting Rankings". Scout.; "2026 Team Ranking". Rivals.

== Roster ==
2026–27 West Georgia Wolves men's basketball team
Players
Coaches

Pos.	#	Name	Height	Weight	Year	Previous school	Hometown
G	0	TJ Farrington	5 ft 9 in (1.75 m)	157 lb (71 kg)	Fr	Gonzaga College HS	Washington, District of Columbia
G	1	Juaquin Dixon	6 ft 4 in (1.93 m)	184 lb (83 kg)	Jr	Malcolm X College	Chicago, Illinois
G	2	Chas Lewless	6 ft 2 in (1.88 m)	184 lb (83 kg)	RS So	San Diego	Detroit, Michigan
F	3	Xavier Shegog	6 ft 6 in (1.98 m)	216 lb (98 kg)	RS So	Mount Vernon School	Nashville, Tennessee
F	4	David Simon	6 ft 11 in (2.11 m)	208 lb (94 kg)	RS Jr	Vermont	Windsor, Ontario, Canada
G/F	11	Micah Smith	6 ft 7 in (2.01 m)	203 lb (92 kg)	Jr	Georgia Southern	Tyrone, Georgia
G	12	Amir Williams	6 ft 7 in (2.01 m)	213 lb (97 kg)	Jr	Hofstra	Newark, Delaware
G	13	Justin Redmond	6 ft 2 in (1.88 m)	177 lb (80 kg)	Jr	Northwestern State	Snellville, Georgia
F	14	Sam Maynard	6 ft 6 in (1.98 m)	212 lb (96 kg)	RS So	Young Harris	Alpharetta, Georgia
G	20	Max Young	6 ft 3 in (1.91 m)	194 lb (88 kg)	RS So	Central HS	Carrollton, Georgia
F	21	Marshal Destremau	6 ft 9 in (2.06 m)	240 lb (109 kg)	RS Sr	Southern Utah	Perth, Australia
F	22	Kenneth Chime	6 ft 9 in (2.06 m)	219 lb (99 kg)	RS So	The McCallie School	Enugu, Nigeria
G/F	24	Lou Hutchinson	6 ft 7 in (2.01 m)	192 lb (87 kg)	RS Sr	Alabama A&M	Upper Marlboro, Maryland
G	30	Cameron Merritt	5 ft 11 in (1.8 m)	173 lb (78 kg)	RS Jr	Carrollton HS	Carrollton, Georgia
F	32	Aleix Sempere	6 ft 8 in (2.03 m)	221 lb (100 kg)	Jr	Iowa Central CC	Barcelona, Spain
F	35	Jaylin Sweat	6 ft 6 in (1.98 m)	208 lb (94 kg)	Fr	Bradwell Institute	Hinesville, Georgia

Head coach

- Dave Moore (Bethel (TN))

Assistant coach(es)

- Andy Young (West Georgia)
- Mark Schult (Wittenberg)
- Willie Evans (West Georgia)
- Chase Crawford (Georgia)

Legend

- (C) Team captain
- (S) Suspended
- (I) Ineligible
- (W) Walk-on
- Injured
- Current redshirt

Roster

== Schedule and results ==
Date time, TV	Rank^{#}	Opponent^{#}	Result	Record	High points	High rebounds	High assists	Site (attendance) city, state
Non-conference regular season
November 2, 2026*; 8:00 p.m., ESPN+		at DePaul	L 58–75	0–1	13 – Redmond	9 – Chime	5 – Lewless	Wintrust Arena (2,487); Chicago, IL
November 5, 2026*; 8:00 p.m., ESPN+		at Loyola Chicago	L 53–76	0–2	16 – Hutchinson	6 – Chime	3 – Lewless	Joseph J. Gentile Arena (1,824); Chicago, IL
November 11, 2026*; 7:00 p.m., ESPN+		UNC Asheville						The Coliseum; Carrollton, GA
November 14, 2026*; 7:00 p.m., ESPN+		at Charleston Southern						Buccaneer Field House; North Charleston, SC
November 18, 2026*; 7:00 p.m., ESPN+		Columbia College (SC)						The Coliseum; Carrollton, GA
November 20, 2026*; 7:00 p.m., ESPN+		Paine College						The Coliseum; Carrollton, GA
November 24, 2026*; 7:30 p.m., ESPN+		at Tennessee Tech						Hooper Eblen Center; Cookeville, TN
November 29, 2026*; 2:00 p.m., ESPN+		at USC Upstate						G. B. Hodge Center; Valley Falls, SC
December 1, 2026*; 11:00 a.m., ESPN+		Southern Indiana						The Coliseum; Carrollton, GA
December 6, 2026*; 6:00 p.m., ESPN+		Life						The Coliseum; Carrollton, GA
December 12, 2026*; 2:00 p.m., SECN		at Vanderbilt						Memorial Gymnasium; Nashville, TN
December 16, 2026*; 6:00 p.m., SECN		at Georgia						Stegeman Coliseum; Athens, GA
December 19, 2026*; 2:00 p.m., ESPN+		West Florida; ASUN-UAC Crossover						The Coliseum; Carrollton, GA
December 21, 2026*; 7:00 p.m., ESPN+		Queens; ASUN-UAC Crossover						The Coliseum; Carrollton, GA
December 31, 2027*; 3:00 p.m., ESPN+		at Lipscomb; ASUN-UAC Crossover						Allen Arena; Nashville, TN
January 2, 2027*; 2:00 p.m., ESPN+		at Bellarmine; ASUN-UAC Crossover						Knights Hall; Louisville, KY
UAC regular season
January 6, 2027; 7:00 p.m., ESPN+		North Alabama						The Coliseum; Carrollton, GA
January 9, 2027; 4:00 p.m., ESPN+		at Eastern Kentucky						Baptist Health Arena; Richmond, KY
January 13, 2027; 8:00 p.m., ESPN+		at Little Rock						Jack Stephens Center; Little Rock, AR
January 16, 2027; 2:00 p.m., ESPN+		at Central Arkansas						Farris Center; Conway, AR
January 20, 2027; 7:45 p.m., ESPN+		UT Arlington						The Coliseum; Carrollton, GA
January 23, 2027; 4:30 p.m., ESPN+		Abilene Christian						The Coliseum; Carrollton, GA
January 27, 2027; 8:45 p.m., ESPN+		at Tarleton State						EECU Center; Stephenville, TX
January 30, 2027; 7:00 p.m., ESPN+		Eastern Kentucky						The Coliseum; Carrollton, GA
February 3, 2027; 7:30 p.m., ESPN+		at North Alabama						CB&S Bank Arena; Florence, AL
February 10, 2027; 7:00 p.m., ESPN+		Little Rock						The Coliseum; Carrollton, GA
February 13, 2027; 2:00 p.m., ESPN+		Austin Peay						The Coliseum; Carrollton, GA
February 17, 2027; 9:00 p.m., ESPN+		at UT Arlington						College Park Center; Arlington, TX
February 20, 2027; 7:00 p.m., ESPN+		at Abilene Christian						Moody Coliseum; Abilene, TX
February 24, 2027; 8:00 p.m., ESPN+		at Austin Peay						F&M Bank Arena; Clarksville, TN
February 27, 2027; 2:00 p.m., ESPN+		Central Arkansas						The Coliseum; Carrollton, GA
March 3, 2027; 7:45 p.m., ESPN+		Tarleton State						The Coliseum; Carrollton, GA
UAC tournament
March 10, 2027; TBD, TBD		vs. TBD						Credit Union of Texas Event Center; Allen, TX
*Non-conference game. ^{#}Rankings from AP Poll. (#) Tournament seedings in parentheses. All times are in Eastern Time.
