= 2026–27 Tarleton State Texans men's basketball team =

American college basketball season

2026–27 Tarleton State Texans men's basketball
- Conference: United Athletic Conference
- Record: 4–2 (0–0 UAC)
- Head coach: Eric Haut (1st season)
- Assistant coaches: Jean Prioleau (1st season); Jake Williams (1st season); Brandon Ubel (1st season); Tre Cobbs (1st season); Bo Gray (1st season)
- Home arena: EECU Center (Capacity: 8,000)

2026–27 United Athletic Conference men's basketball standings
	Conf.				Overall
Team	W		L	PCT	W		L	PCT
UT Arlington	0	–	0	–	5	–	1	.833
Eastern Kentucky	0	–	0	–	4	–	1	.800
North Alabama	0	–	0	–	4	–	2	.667
Tarleton State	0	–	0	–	4	–	2	.667
Austin Peay	0	–	0	–	3	–	2	.600
Abilene Christian	0	–	0	–	2	–	3	.400
Central Arkansas	0	–	0	–	2	–	3	.400
Little Rock	0	–	0	–	2	–	3	.400
West Georgia*	0	–	0	–	1	–	4	.200
† 2027 UAC tournament winner * ineligible for the 2027 NCAA tournament due to transition from Division II; As of November 20, 2026

The 2026–27 Tarleton State Texans men's basketball team represents Tarleton State University during the 2026–27 NCAA Division I men's basketball season. The Texans are led by first-year head coach Eric Haut and play their home games at EECU Center in Stephenville, Texas as a member of the United Athletic Conference. This will mark Tarleton State's first season as members of the re-branded United Athletic Conference after spending the previous six seasons as members of the Western Athletic Conference.

== Previous season ==
Tarleton State finished the 2025-26 season 14–18, 5–13 in the Western Athletic Conference to finish seventh in the conference. As the 7-seed in the WAC Tournament the Texans were defeated by 6-seed Abilene Christian in the First round 78–84 to end their season. On January 15, the Texans announced that head coach Billy Gillispie was stepping away indefinitely due to health issues, and associate head coach Glynn Cyprien was named interim head coach. On February 27, the school announced that Gillispie would not be retained following the season. Two days after the conclusion of the season, on March 13 the Texans hired Utah State assistant coach Eric Haut as the program's new head coach.

=== Departures ===
Tarleton State Texans departures
Name	Number	Pos.	Height	Weight	Year	Hometown	Reason for departure
Jordan Mizell	0	G	6'1"	170	Sophomore	Plano, TX	Transferred to Texas A&M-Corpus Christi
AJ Dent Jr.	1	F	6'5"	205	Junior	Thomasville, GA	Transferred to Nicholls
Cam Thomas	2	G	6'3"	190	Freshman	Chicago, IL	Transferred to Tarleton State
DJ Dormu	3	G	5'9"	175	Sophomore	Washington, DC	Transferred to Southern
Malek Archie	5	G	6'2"	185	(redshirt) Freshman	Chicago, IL	Transferred to Lindenwood
Kaia Isaac	6	G	6'4"	215	Senior	Christchurch, New Zealand	Transferred to Portland
Dior Johnson	7	G	6'3"	185	Junior	Kingston, NY	Transferred to UCF
Damion Porter Jr.	10	G	6'2"	205	Freshman	Chicago, IL	Entered transfer portal
Roy Marom	14	G	5'8"	150	Junior	Frisco, TX	Entered transfer portal
Jaden Jinks	22	F	6'8"	195	Freshman	Missouri City, TX	Transferred to Ranger College
Chris Mpaka	23	F	6'6"	225	Senior	Kinshasa, D.R. Congo	Out of eligibility
Ocypher Owens	24	F	6'7"	215	Senior	Orlando, FL	Out of eligibility
Cam McDowell	55	G	6'5"	190	Senior	Griffin, GA	Out of eligibility
Andy Sigiscar	97	F	6'9"	230	(redshirt) Freshman	Orléans, France	Departed program

=== Incoming transfers ===
Tarleton State Texans incoming transfers
Name	Number	Pos.	Height	Weight	Year	Hometown	Previous School
Adrian Shackleton	0	G	6'4"	190	Junior	Palm Beach, FL	Daytona State
Caleb Blackwell	1	G	6'1"	185	Graduate	Buford, GA	UTEP
Franck Emmou	2	G	6'5"	190	Senior	Arlington, TX	Texas State
TJ Cope	3	G	6'7"	200	Senior	Boston, MA	New Orleans
JaVar Daniel	5	F	6'10"	220	Senior	Memphis, TN	West Georgia
Trey Harris	7	G	6'7"	210	Graduate	Houston, TX	West Virginia State
Brett Freeman	8	G	6'5"	185	Sophomore	Bronx, NY	Virginia Tech
Jac Mani	11	F	6'9"	235	Graduate	Los Angeles, CA	Fresno State
Isaac Harrell	12	F	6'8"	205	Senior	Jonesboro, AR	Elon
Ethan Carter	35	F	6'8"	200	Sophomore	Fairburn, GA	Northeastern JC
Josh Hayes	44	F	6'9"	210	Senior	Gainesville, FL	Utah

=== 2026 recruiting class ===
College recruiting
Name	Hometown	School	Height	Weight	Commit date
Caeden Hutcherson; SG	Glendale, AZ	Dream City Christian	6 ft 5 in (1.96 m)	185 lb (84 kg)	Jun 5, 2026
Caeden Hutcherson; SG	Recruit ratings: 247Sports: (NR)				
Overall recruit ranking: Scout: – Rivals: –
Note: In many cases, Scout, Rivals, 247Sports, On3, and ESPN may conflict in their listings of height and weight.; In these cases, the average was taken. ESPN grades are on a 100-point scale.; Sources: "2026 Tarleton State Basketball Recruiting Commits". Scout.; "Scout.com Team Recruiting Rankings". Scout.; "2026 Team Ranking". Rivals.

== Roster ==
2026–27 Tarleton State Texans men's basketball team
Players
Coaches

Pos.	#	Name	Height	Weight	Year	Previous school	Hometown
G	0	Adrian Shackleton	6 ft 4 in (1.93 m)	190 lb (86 kg)	Jr	Daytona State	Palm Beach, Florida
G	1	Caleb Blackwell	6 ft 1 in (1.85 m)	185 lb (84 kg)	GS	UTEP	Buford, Georgia
G	2	Franck Emmou	6 ft 5 in (1.96 m)	190 lb (86 kg)	Sr	Texas State	Arlington, Texas
G	3	TJ Cope	6 ft 7 in (2.01 m)	200 lb (91 kg)	Sr	New Orleans	Boston, Massachusetts
G	4	Leroy Kelly IV	6 ft 2 in (1.88 m)	195 lb (88 kg)	So	Dynamic Prep	Dallas, Texas
F	5	JaVar Daniel	6 ft 10 in (2.08 m)	220 lb (100 kg)	Sr	West Georgia	Memphis, Tennessee
G	6	Caeden Hutcherson	6 ft 5 in (1.96 m)	190 lb (86 kg)	Fr	Dream City Christian	San Francisco, California
G	7	Trey Harris	6 ft 7 in (2.01 m)	210 lb (95 kg)	GS	West Virginia State	Houston, Texas
G	8	Brett Freeman	6 ft 5 in (1.96 m)	185 lb (84 kg)	So	Virginia Tech	Bronx, New York
F	11	Jac Mani	6 ft 9 in (2.06 m)	235 lb (107 kg)	GS	Fresno State	Los Angeles, California
F	12	Isaac Harrell	6 ft 8 in (2.03 m)	205 lb (93 kg)	Sr	Elon	Jonesboro, Arkansas
G	13	Kade Douglas	6 ft 0 in (1.83 m)	180 lb (82 kg)	Sr	UT Arlington	Lancaster, Texas
G	14	Joseph Martinez	6 ft 3 in (1.91 m)	185 lb (84 kg)	Sr	Canutillo HS	El Paso, Texas
F	15	Matyas Vrabel	6 ft 10 in (2.08 m)	235 lb (107 kg)	Sr	Davenport	Ostrava, Czech Republic
F	35	Ethan Carter	6 ft 8 in (2.03 m)	200 lb (91 kg)	So	Northeastern JC	Fairburn, Georgia
F	44	Josh Hayes	6 ft 9 in (2.06 m)	210 lb (95 kg)	Sr	Utah	Gainesville, Florida

Head coach

- Eric Haut (Kent State)

Assistant coach(es)

- Jean Prioleau (Fordham)
- Jake Williams (Middle Tennessee)
- Brandon Ubel (Nebraska)
- Tre Cobbs (Georgia Southern)
- Bo Gray (Youngstown State)

Legend

- (C) Team captain
- (S) Suspended
- (I) Ineligible
- (W) Walk-on
- Injured
- Current redshirt

Roster

== Schedule and results ==
Date time, TV	Rank^{#}	Opponent^{#}	Result	Record	High points	High rebounds	High assists	Site (attendance) city, state
Non-conference regular season
November 2, 2026*; 7:00 p.m., ESPN+		Cameron	W 86–60	1–0	17 – Mani	10 – Kelly IV	7 – Kelly IV	EECU Center (2,389); Stephenville, TX
November 8, 2026*; 8:30 p.m., ESPN+		at San Diego	L 90–96 ^{OT}	1–1	20 – Cope	8 – Shackleton	6 – Emmou	Jenny Craig Pavilion (927); San Diego, CA
November 10, 2026*; 7:00 p.m., ESPN+		UT Dallas	W 76–57	2–1	21 – Freeman	12 – Tied	2 – Tied	EECU Center (1,371); Stephenville, TX
November 13, 2026*; 7:00 p.m., ESPN+		Alcorn State	W 73–69	3–1	17 – Emmou	11 – Hayes	3 – Tied	EECU Center (1,883); Stephenville, TX
November 16, 2026*; 6:30 p.m., ESPN+		at Drake	W 83–79	4–1	20 – Daniel	6 – Tied	5 – Cope	Knapp Center (2,993); Des Moines, IA
November 19, 2026*; 10:00 p.m., BTN		at No. 18т USC	L 51–96	4–2	14 – Emmou	5 – Hayes	4 – Emmou	Galen Center (2,782); Los Angeles, CA
November 24, 2026*; 6:00 p.m., ESPN+		at Weber State						Dee Events Center; Ogden, UT
November 29, 2026*; 3:00 p.m., ESPN+		at Texas Southern						H&PE Arena; Houston, TX
December 2, 2026*; 7:00 p.m., ESPN+		Randall						EECU Center; Stephenville, TX
December 5, 2026*; 2:00 p.m., ACCNX		at Pittsburgh						Petersen Events Center; Pittsburgh, PA
December 8, 2026*; 7:00 p.m., ESPN+		UNT Dallas						EECU Center; Stephenville, TX
December 12, 2026*; 4:00 p.m., ESPN+		Missouri State						EECU Center; Stephenville, TX
December 19, 2026*; 1:00 p.m., ESPN+		at Florida Gulf Coast; ASUN-UAC Crossover						Alico Arena; Fort Myers, FL
December 21, 2026*; 6:00 p.m., ESPN+		at Stetson; ASUN-UAC Crossover						Insight Credit Union Arena; DeLand, FL
December 28, 2026*; 7:00 p.m., ESPN+		West Florida; ASUN-UAC Crossover						EECU Center; Stephenville, TX
January 2, 2027*; 4:00 p.m., ESPN+		North Florida; ASUN-UAC Crossover						EECU Center; Stephenville, TX
UAC regular season
January 6, 2027; 7:00 p.m., ESPN+		Central Arkansas						EECU Center; Stephenville, TX
January 9, 2027; 4:15 p.m., ESPN+		Little Rock						EECU Center; Stephenville, TX
January 13, 2027; 7:00 p.m., ESPN+		at Eastern Kentucky						Baptist Health Arena; Richmond, KY
January 16, 2027; 4:30 p.m., ESPN+		at Austin Peay						F&M Bank Arena; Clarksville, TN
January 23, 2027; 7:00 p.m., ESPN+		at Little Rock						Jack Stephens Center; Little Rock, AR
January 27, 2027; 7:45 p.m., ESPN+		West Georgia						EECU Center; Stephenville, TX
January 30, 2027; 4:00 p.m., ESPN+		Austin Peay						EECU Center; Stephenville, TX
February 6, 2027; 6:00 p.m., ESPN+		at Abilene Christian						Moody Coliseum; Abilene, TX
February 10, 2027; 7:45 p.m., ESPN+		North Alabama						EECU Center; Stephenville, TX
February 13, 2027; 5:00 p.m., ESPN+		at UT Arlington						College Park Center; Arlington, TX
February 17, 2027; 7:30 p.m., ESPN+		at Central Arkansas						Farris Center; Conway, AR
February 20, 2027; 4:15 p.m., ESPN+		Eastern Kentucky						EECU Center; Stephenville, TX
February 24, 2027; 7:45 p.m., ESPN+		Abilene Christian						EECU Center; Stephenville, TX
February 27, 2027; 4:00 p.m., ESPN+		UT Arlington						EECU Center; Stephenville, TX
March 3, 2027; 6:45 p.m., ESPN+		at West Georgia						The Coliseum; Carrollton, GA
March 6, 2027; 7:00 p.m., ESPN+		at North Alabama						CB&S Bank Arena; Florence, AL
UAC tournament
March 10, 2027; TBD, TBD		vs. TBD						Credit Union of Texas Event Center; Allen, TX
*Non-conference game. ^{#}Rankings from AP Poll. (#) Tournament seedings in parentheses. All times are in Central Time.
