= 2026–27 Abilene Christian Wildcats men's basketball team =

American college basketball season

2026–27 Abilene Christian Wildcats men's basketball
- Conference: United Athletic Conference
- Record: 1–1 (0–0 UAC)
- Head coach: Brette Tanner (6th season)
- Assistant coaches: Danny Young (2nd season); Elliott De Wit (1st season); Reggie Miller (1st season); Darren Best (1st season); Marlon McCoy (1st season)
- Home arena: Moody Coliseum (Capacity: 3,600)

2026–27 United Athletic Conference men's basketball standings
	Conf.				Overall
Team	W		L	PCT	W		L	PCT
Eastern Kentucky	0	–	0	–	4	–	1	.800
Tarleton State	0	–	0	–	4	–	1	.800
UT Arlington	0	–	0	–	4	–	1	.800
North Alabama	0	–	0	–	3	–	2	.600
Austin Peay	0	–	0	–	2	–	2	.500
Central Arkansas	0	–	0	–	2	–	3	.400
Abilene Christian	0	–	0	–	1	–	3	.250
Little Rock	0	–	0	–	1	–	3	.250
West Georgia*	0	–	0	–	0	–	3	.000
† 2027 UAC tournament winner * ineligible for the 2027 NCAA tournament due to transition from Division II; As of November 17, 2026

The 2026–27 Abilene Christian Wildcats men's basketball team represents Abilene Christian University during the 2026–27 NCAA Division I men's basketball season. The Wildcats are led by sixth-year head coach Brette Tanner and play their home games at Moody Coliseum in Abilene, Texas as a member of the United Athletic Conference. This will mark Abilene Christian's first season as members of the re-branded United Athletic Conference after spending the previous five seasons as members of the Western Athletic Conference.

== Previous season ==
Tarleton State finished the 2025-26 season 14–19, 5–13 in the Western Athletic Conference to finish seventh in the conference. As the 6-seed in the WAC Tournament the Wildcats defeated by 7-seed Tarleton State in the First round before falling to 3-seed Utah Tech 74–80 to end their season.

=== Departures ===
Abilene Christian Wildcats departures
Name	Number	Pos.	Height	Weight	Year	Hometown	Reason for departure
Zy Wright	0	G	6'5"	-	Senior	Lincolnton, GA	Out of eligibility
Tylan Lewis	3	G	6'0"	200	Freshman	Nashville, TN	Transferred to Trevecca
Rich Smith	4	G	6'2"	180	Senior	Bronx, NY	Out of eligibility
Cbo Newton	5	G	6'3"	190	(redshirt) Sophomore	Ruston, LA	Transferred to Tennessee Tech
Christian Alston	7	G	6'7"	200	Sophomore	Memphis, TN	Transferred to Tennessee State
Joseph Scott	10	F	6'9"	210	Junior	Baltimore, MD	Transferred to Alabama State
Ma'Shy Hill	11	F	6'8"	250	Junior	Austin, TX	Transferred to Jacksonville State
Bradyn Hubbard	15	F	6'5"	235	Senior	Tulsa, OK	Transferred to Little Rock
Joseph Venzant	23	G	6'2"	210	(redshirt) Senior	Midland, TX	Out of eligibility

=== Incoming transfers ===
Abilene Christian Wildcats incoming transfers
Name	Number	Pos.	Height	Weight	Year	Hometown	Previous School
Gus Salem	0	G	6'2"	-	(redshirt) Sophomore	Los Angeles, CA	Central Michigan
Victor Yimga Moukouri	1	F/C	6'8"	-	Sophomore	Paris, France	Howard College
Willan Marie-Anais	5	F	6'7"	-	Freshman	Petit-Bourg, France	Fos Provence Basket
Xabi Lopez	6	G	6'4"	-	Freshman	Santa Cruz de Tenerife, Spain	CB Canarias
Timeo Pons	29	G	6'8"	-	Sophomore	Les Sables-d'Olonne, France	New Mexico
Noah Bolanga	66	G	6'9"	-	Junior	Poitiers, France	Utah Tech
Evan Boisdur	97	G	6'1"	-	Sophomore	Lamentin, France	Grand Canyon

=== 2026 recruiting class ===
College recruiting
Name	Hometown	School	Height	Weight	Commit date
Drew Haffner; SG	Westfield, IN	Westfield HS	6 ft 4 in (1.93 m)	170 lb (77 kg)	Sep 17, 2025
Drew Haffner; SG	Recruit ratings: (NR)				
Stetson Rowley; SG/SF	Phoenix, AZ	PHH Prep	6 ft 7 in (2.01 m)	N/A	Oct 8, 2025
Stetson Rowley; SG/SF	Recruit ratings: (NR)				
J'Den Shields; SF	Tulsa, OK	South Central Prep	6 ft 4 in (1.93 m)	200 lb (91 kg)	Oct 12, 2025
J'Den Shields; SF	Recruit ratings: (NR)				
Armani Theus; PG	Missouri City, TX	Thurgood Marshall HS	6 ft 0 in (1.83 m)	N/A	May 29, 2026
Armani Theus; PG	Recruit ratings: (NR)				
Overall recruit ranking: Scout: – Rivals: –
Note: In many cases, Scout, Rivals, 247Sports, On3, and ESPN may conflict in their listings of height and weight.; In these cases, the average was taken. ESPN grades are on a 100-point scale.; Sources: "2026 Abilene Christian Basketball Recruiting Commits". Scout.; "Scout.com Team Recruiting Rankings". Scout.; "2026 Team Ranking". Rivals.

== Roster ==
2026–27 Abilene Christian Wildcats men's basketball team
Players
Coaches

Pos.	#	Name	Height	Weight	Year	Previous school	Hometown
G	0	Gus Salem	6 ft 2 in (1.88 m)	—	RS So	Central Michigan	Los Angeles, California
F/C	1	Victor Yimga Moukouri	6 ft 8 in (2.03 m)	—	So	Howard College	Paris, France
G	2	Yaniel Rivera	6 ft 4 in (1.93 m)	180 lb (82 kg)	Sr	Dade Christian School	Bayamón, Puerto Rico
G	3	Drew Haffner	6 ft 3 in (1.91 m)	—	Fr	Westfield HS	Westfield, Indiana
F	4	Stetson Rowley	6 ft 7 in (2.01 m)	—	Fr	PHH Prep	Mesa, Arizona
F	5	Willan Marie-Anais	6 ft 7 in (2.01 m)	—	Fr	Fos Provence Basket	Petit-Bourg, France
G	6	Xabi Lopez	6 ft 4 in (1.93 m)	—	Fr	CB Canarias	Santa Cruz de Tenerife, Spain
G	7	Armani Theus	6 ft 0 in (1.83 m)	—	Fr	Thurgood Marshall HS	Houston, Texas
G	10	J'Den Shields	6 ft 3 in (1.91 m)	—	Fr	South Central Prep	Amarillo, Texas
G	20	Isaiah Neyhart	5 ft 10 in (1.78 m)	165 lb (75 kg)	So	Wylie HS	Abilene, Texas
F	21	Cade Hornecker	7 ft 0 in (2.13 m)	250 lb (113 kg)	RS Sr	Southern Illinois	Amarillo, Texas
G	24	Isaac Dye	6 ft 3 in (1.91 m)	200 lb (91 kg)	So	Athletes in Action Prep	State College, Pennsylvania
G	29	Timeo Pons	6 ft 8 in (2.03 m)	—	So	New Mexico	Les Sables-d'Olonne, France
G	66	Noah Bolanga	6 ft 9 in (2.06 m)	—	Jr	Utah Tech	Poitiers, France
G	97	Evan Boisdur	6 ft 1 in (1.85 m)	—	So	Grand Canyon	Lamentin, France

Head coach

- Brette Tanner (Emporia State)

Assistant coach(es)

- Danny Young (Grand Canyon)
- Elliott De Wit (Texas Tech)
- Reggie Miller (Abilene Christian)
- Darren Best (York College)
- Marlon McCoy (Paine College)

Legend

- (C) Team captain
- (S) Suspended
- (I) Ineligible
- (W) Walk-on
- Injured
- Current redshirt

Roster

== Schedule and results ==
Date time, TV	Rank^{#}	Opponent^{#}	Result	Record	High points	High rebounds	High assists	Site (attendance) city, state
Non-conference regular season
November 2, 2026*; 8:00 p.m., ESPN+		at Colorado	L 59–94	0–1	13 – Pons	8 – Marie-Anais	2 – Tied	CU Events Center (4,420); Boulder, CO
November 7, 2026*; 1:00 p.m., ESPN+		Lamar	W 83–81	1–1	18 – Dye	8 – Tied	7 – Boisdur	Moody Coliseum (803); Abilene, TX
November 11, 2026*; 7:00 p.m., ESPN+		Stephen F. Austin						Moody Coliseum; Abilene, TX
November 16, 2026*; 7:00 p.m., ESPN+		at Missouri State						Great Southern Bank Arena; Springfield, MO
November 18, 2026*; 8:00 p.m., ESPN+		McMurry						Moody Coliseum; Abilene, TX
November 21, 2026*; 7:00 p.m., ESPN+		Southwestern Adventist						Moody Coliseum; Abilene, TX
November 25, 2026*; 10:00 p.m., SLN		at South Dakota State						First Bank and Trust Arena; Brookings, SD
November 28, 2026*; 7:00 p.m., ESPN+		Dallas						Moody Coliseum; Abilene, TX
December 1, 2026*; 7:00 p.m., ESPN+		Pepperdine						Moody Coliseum; Abilene, TX
December 5, 2026*; 2:00 p.m., ESPN+		South Dakota State						Moody Coliseum; Abilene, TX
December 9, 2026*; 7:00 p.m., ESPN+		Hardin-Simmons						Moody Coliseum; Abilene, TX
December 13, 2026*; 2:00 p.m., ESPN+		at Utah						Jon M. Huntsman Center; Salt Lake City, UT
December 19, 2026*; 1:00 p.m., ESPN+		at Stetson; ASUN-UAC Crossover						Insight Credit Union Arena; DeLand, FL
December 21, 2026*; 6:00 p.m., ESPN+		at Florida Gulf Coast; ASUN-UAC Crossover						Alico Arena; Fort Myers, FL
December 31, 2026*; 3:00 p.m., ESPN+		North Florida; ASUN-UAC Crossover						Moody Coliseum; Abilene, TX
January 2, 2027*; 6:00 p.m., ESPN+		Jacksonville; ASUN-UAC Crossover						Moody Coliseum; Abilene, TX
UAC regular season
January 6, 2027; 7:00 p.m., ESPN+		Little Rock						Moody Coliseum; Abilene, TX
January 13, 2027; 7:30 p.m., ESPN+		at Central Arkansas						Farris Center; Conway, AR
January 16, 2027; 6:00 p.m., ESPN+		UT Arlington						Moody Coliseum; Abilene, TX
January 20, 2027; 7:45 p.m., ESPN+		at North Alabama						CB&S Bank Arena; Florence, AL
January 23, 2027; 3:30 p.m., ESPN+		at West Georgia						The Coliseum; Carrollton, GA
January 27, 2027; 7:00 p.m., ESPN+		Austin Peay						Moody Coliseum; Abilene, TX
January 30, 2027; 5:00 p.m., ESPN+		at UT Arlington						College Park Center; Arlington, TX
February 3, 2027; 7:00 p.m., ESPN+		Central Arkansas						Moody Coliseum; Abilene, TX
February 6, 2027; 6:00 p.m., ESPN+		Tarleton State						Moody Coliseum; Abilene, TX
February 10, 2027; 7:30 p.m., ESPN+		at Austin Peay						F&M Bank Arena; Clarksville, TN
February 13, 2027; 3:00 p.m., ESPN+		at Eastern Kentucky						Baptist Health Arena; Richmond, KY
February 17, 2027; 8:00 p.m., ESPN+		North Alabama						Moody Coliseum; Abilene, TX
February 20, 2027; 6:00 p.m., ESPN+		West Georgia						Moody Coliseum; Abilene, TX
February 24, 2027; 7:45 p.m., ESPN+		at Tarleton State						EECU Center; Stephenville, TX
March 3, 2027; 7:00 p.m., ESPN+		Eastern Kentucky						Moody Coliseum; Abilene, TX
March 6, 2027; 7:00 p.m., ESPN+		at Little Rock						Jack Stephens Center; Little Rock, AR
UAC tournament
March 10, 2027; TBD, TBD		vs. TBD						Credit Union of Texas Event Center; Allen, TX
*Non-conference game. ^{#}Rankings from AP Poll. (#) Tournament seedings in parentheses. All times are in Central Time.
