= 2026–27 Jacksonville Dolphins men's basketball team =

American college basketball season

2026–27 Jacksonville Dolphins men's basketball
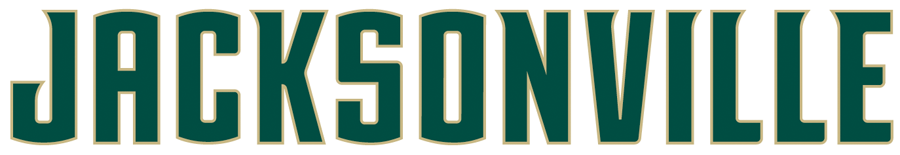
- Conference: Atlantic Sun Conference
- Record: 2–4 (0–0 ASUN)
- Head coach: Jordan Mincy (6th season)
- Associate head coach: Troy Pierce
- Assistant coaches: Mychal Covington; Brett Comer; Timothy Peete; Joshua Washington
- Home arena: Swisher Gymnasium

2026–27 ASUN men's basketball standings
	Conf.				Overall
Team	W		L	PCT	W		L	PCT
North Florida	0	–	0	–	3	–	3	.500
Queens	0	–	0	–	3	–	3	.500
West Florida*	0	–	0	–	3	–	3	.500
Lipscomb	0	–	0	–	3	–	4	.429
Florida Gulf Coast	0	–	0	–	2	–	4	.333
Jacksonville	0	–	0	–	2	–	4	.333
Bellarmine	0	–	0	–	2	–	5	.286
Stetson	0	–	0	–	1	–	5	.167
† 2027 ASUN tournament winner * ineligible for the 2027 NCAA tournament due to transition from Division II; As of November 22, 2026; Rankings from AP poll

The 2026–27 Jacksonville Dolphins men's basketball team represents Jacksonville University during the 2026–27 NCAA Division I men's basketball season. The Dolphins, led by sixth-year head coach Jordan Mincy, play their home games at Swisher Gymnasium in Jacksonville, Florida as members of the Atlantic Sun Conference.

== Previous season ==
The Dolphins finished the 2025–27 season 12–20, 7–11 in ASUN play, to finish in a tie for seventh place. As the No. 9 seed in the ASUN tournament they were defeated by Bellarmine in the first round.

== Roster ==
2026–27 Jacksonville Dolphins men's basketball team
Players
Coaches

Pos.	#	Name	Height	Weight	Year	Previous school	Hometown
G	0	Jamie Phillips Jr.	6 ft 5 in (1.96 m)	205 lb (93 kg)	Jr	Stetson	Winter Haven, Florida
G	1	Caleb Williams	6 ft 0 in (1.83 m)	165 lb (75 kg)	Jr	Lafayette	Jacksonville, Florida
G	2	Lyndell Buckingham Jr.	6 ft 2 in (1.88 m)	—	Fr	Leadership Prep	McKinney, Texas
G	5	Evan Roberts	6 ft 1 in (1.85 m)	—	Fr	Parrish Community High School	Palmetto, Florida
F	6	Nehemiah Turner	6 ft 10 in (2.08 m)	270 lb (122 kg)	Jr	Minnesota	Auburndale, Florida
F	7	Jaden Newell	6 ft 8 in (2.03 m)	225 lb (102 kg)	GS	Georgia	Destin, Florida
G	8	Hayden Wood	6 ft 6 in (1.98 m)	205 lb (93 kg)	So	Har-Ber High School	Springdale, Arkansas
G	9	LJ Katz	5 ft 11 in (1.8 m)	—	Fr	IMG Academy	Hoboken, New Jersey
G	12	Roman Loux	6 ft 0 in (1.83 m)	165 lb (75 kg)	So	Tocoi Creek High School	St. Augustine, Florida
F	22	James Morrow	6 ft 8 in (2.03 m)	210 lb (95 kg)	Sr	South Carolina State	Jacksonville, Florida
F	25	Rex Sterling	6 ft 8 in (2.03 m)	220 lb (100 kg)	Sr	Wofford	Melbourne, Australia
G	34	Evan Sterck	6 ft 1 in (1.85 m)	180 lb (82 kg)	So	The Rock School	St. Louis, Missouri
C	35	Sam Mbingazo	6 ft 9 in (2.06 m)	—	Fr	Bishop Alemany High School	Kinshasa, DR Congo
G	44	Maddox Palmer	6 ft 5 in (1.96 m)	—	Fr	Ponte Vedra Beach High School	Ponte Vedra Beach, Florida

Head coach

- Jordan Mincy (Kent State)

Assistant coach(es)

- Troy Pierce (Emporia State)
- Mychal Covington (Oakland)
- Brett Comer (Florida Gulf Coast)
- Timothy Peete (Tulsa)
- Joshua Washington (Marian)

Legend

- (C) Team captain
- (S) Suspended
- (I) Ineligible
- (W) Walk-on
- Injured
- Current redshirt

Roster
Last update: November 16, 2026

== Schedule and results ==
Date time, TV	Rank^{#}	Opponent^{#}	Result	Record	Site (attendance) city, state
Non-conference regular season
November 2, 2026*; 7:00 p.m., ESPN+		Trinity College of Jacksonville	W 105–61	1–0	Swisher Gymnasium (876); Jacksonville, FL
November 5, 2026*; 8:00 p.m., SECN+		at Florida	L 57–88	1–1	O'Connell Center (10,007); Gainesville, FL
November 9, 2026*; 7:00 p.m., ESPN+		Kansas City	W 79–61	2–1	Swisher Gymnasium (789); Jacksonville, FL
November 16, 2026*; 7:00 p.m., SECN		at Georgia	L 62–107	2–2	Stegeman Coliseum (5,746); Athens, GA
November 19, 2026*; 7:00 p.m., ESPN+		Little Rock	L 72–78	2–3	Swisher Gymnasium (761); Jacksonville, FL
November 21, 2026*; 4:00 p.m., ESPN+		Central Arkansas	L 67–82	2–4	Swisher Gymnasium (778); Jacksonville, FL
November 24, 2026*; 7:00 p.m., B1G+		at Indiana			Simon Skjodt Assembly Hall; Bloomington, IN
November 28, 2026*; 6:00 p.m., ESPN+		Trinity College of Jacksonville			Swisher Gymnasium; Jacksonville, FL
December 1, 2026*; 7:00 p.m., ESPN+		at UCF			Addition Financial Arena; Orlando, FL
December 5, 2026*; 3:00 p.m., ESPN+		FIU			Swisher Gymnasium; Jacksonville, FL
December 9, 2026*; 7:00 p.m., ESPN+		at South Florida			Yuengling Center; Tampa, FL
December 12, 2026*; 3:00 p.m., ESPN+		Baptist University of Florida			Swisher Gymnasium; Jacksonville, FL
December 16, 2026*; 7:00 p.m., ACCN		at Florida State			Donald L. Tucker Center; Tallahassee, FL
December 19, 2026*; 4:30 p.m., Peacock		at USC			Galen Center; Los Angeles, California
December 28, 2026*; 2:00 p.m., ESPN+		Fort Lauderdale			Swisher Gymnasium; Jacksonville, FL
December 31, 2026*; 3:00 p.m., ESPN+		at UT Arlington			College Park Center; Arlington, TX
January 2, 2027*; 7:00 p.m., ESPN+		at Abilene Christian			Moody Coliseum; Abilene, TX
ASUN regular season
January 7, 2027; 7:00 p.m., ESPN+		Lipscomb			Swisher Gymnasium; Jacksonville, FL
January 9, 2027; 6:00 p.m., ESPN+		Bellarmine			Swisher Gymnasium; Jacksonville, FL
January 14, 2027; 7:00 p.m., ESPN+		at Queens			Curry Arena; Charlotte, NC
January 16, 2027; 2:00 p.m., ESPN+		at West Florida			PenAir Field House; Pensacola, FL
January 22, 2027; 7:00 p.m., ESPN+		North Florida			Swisher Gymnasium; Jacksonville, FL
January 28, 2027; TBD, ESPN+		Florida Gulf Coast			Swisher Gymnasium; Jacksonville, FL
January 30, 2027; 6:00 p.m., ESPN+		Stetson			Swisher Gymnasium; Jacksonville, FL
February 4, 2027; 7:00 p.m., ESPN+		at Bellarmine			Knights Hall; Louisville, KY
February 6, 2027; 5:00 p.m., ESPN+		at Lipscomb			Allen Arena; Nashville, TN
February 11, 2027; 7:00 p.m., ESPN+		West Florida			Swisher Gymnasium; Jacksonville, FL
February 13, 2027; 7:00 pm, ESPN+		Queens			Swisher Gymnasium; Jacksonville, FL
February 19, 2027; 7:00 p.m., ESPN+		at North Florida			UNF Arena; Jacksonville, FL
February 25, 2027; 7:30 p.m., ESPN+		at Stetson			Insight Credit Union Arena; DeLand, FL
February 27, 2027; 4:00 p.m., ESPN+		at Florida Gulf Coast			Alico Arena; Fort Myers, FL
ASUN tournament
TBD; TBD, TBD	(TBD)	(TBD) TBD; TBD			TBD (TBD); TBD
*Non-conference game. ^{#}Rankings from AP Poll. (#) Tournament seedings in parentheses. All times are in Eastern.
