= 2026–27 Eastern Kentucky Colonels men's basketball team =

American college basketball season

2026–27 Eastern Kentucky Colonels men's basketball
- Conference: United Athletic Conference
- Record: 2–1 (0–0 UAC)
- Head coach: A. W. Hamilton (9th season)
- Associate head coach: Steve Lepore (2nd, 9th overall season)
- Assistant coaches: Jake Lorbach (3rd season); Ben Veshi (1st season); Luchiano Gomez-Joseph (1st season)
- Home arena: Baptist Health Arena (Capacity: 6,500)

2026–27 United Athletic Conference men's basketball standings
	Conf.				Overall
Team	W		L	PCT	W		L	PCT
Eastern Kentucky	0	–	0	–	4	–	1	.800
Tarleton State	0	–	0	–	4	–	1	.800
UT Arlington	0	–	0	–	4	–	1	.800
North Alabama	0	–	0	–	3	–	2	.600
Austin Peay	0	–	0	–	2	–	2	.500
Central Arkansas	0	–	0	–	2	–	3	.400
Abilene Christian	0	–	0	–	1	–	3	.250
Little Rock	0	–	0	–	1	–	3	.250
West Georgia*	0	–	0	–	0	–	3	.000
† 2027 UAC tournament winner * ineligible for the 2027 NCAA tournament due to transition from Division II; As of November 17, 2026

The 2026–27 Eastern Kentucky Colonels men's basketball team represents Eastern Kentucky University during the 2026–27 NCAA Division I men's basketball season. The Colonels are led by ninth-year head coach A. W. Hamilton and play their home games at Baptist Health Arena in Richmond, Kentucky as a member of the United Athletic Conference. This will also mark Eastern Kentucky's first season as members of the United Athletic Conference after spending the previous five seasons as members of the Atlantic Sun Conference.

== Previous season ==
Tarleton State finished the 2025-26 season 11–21, 7–11 in the Atlantic Sun Conference to finish tied for seventh in the conference. As the 7-seed in the ASUN Tournament the Colonels were defeated by 10-seed Stetson in the First round 76–92 to end their season.

=== Departures ===
Eastern Kentucky Colonels departures
Name	Number	Pos.	Height	Weight	Year	Hometown	Reason for departure
Turner Buttry	0	G	5'11"	165	Senior	Bowling Green, KY	Out of eligibility
Amarr Knox	1	G	6'3"	170	Senior	Memphis, TN	Ruled ineligible
Tyler Jackson	2	G	6'2"	153	Freshman	Baltimore, MD	Transferred to Hampton
MJ Williams	3	G	5'10"	168	Freshman	Rocky Mount, NC	Transferred to Longwood
Juan Cranford Jr.	4	G	6'4"	205	Sophomore	Dayton, OH	Transferred to Bowling Green
Jayden Harris	5	G/F	6'7"	189	(redshirt) Freshman	Dumfries, VA	Transferred to UMass Lowell
Trey Coles	7	G	6'4"	200	Freshman	Richmond, VA	Transferred to Indianapolis
Jalen Cooper	8	F	6'7"	215	Graduate	St. Petersburg, FL	Out of eligibility
Montavious Myrick	13	F	6'8"	208	Graduate	Atlanta, GA	Out of eligibility
Asa White	24	C	6'9"	200	Junior	Raleigh, NC	Transferred to Lincoln (PA)

=== Incoming transfers ===
Eastern Kentucky Colonels incoming transfers
Name	Number	Pos.	Height	Weight	Year	Hometown	Previous School
Duje Dujmovic	0	F	6'9"	225	Junior	Düsseldorf, Germany	Dragons Rhöndorf
Justin McCarter	1	G	6'6"	190	(redshirt) Junior	Marietta, GA	Northeastern Oklahoma A&M
Drae Vasser	2	G	6'1"	200	(redshirt) Sophomore	Louisville, KY	Vincennes
Damone King	3	G	6'2"	180	(redshirt) Sophomore	Louisville, KY	Rhode Island
Josh Lowe	4	F	6'8"	210	Junior	Lewisville, TX	Moberly Area CC
Omer Hamama	10	G	6'2"	190	Sophomore	Rishon LeZion, Israel	Kent State
Mouhamed Camara	12	F	6'8"	225	(redshirt) Freshman	Dakar, Senegal	Louisville
Bobby Hardison	13	G	6'5"	190	Sophomore	Mooresville, NC	Palm Beach Atlantic
Shadrak Lasu	22	F	6'8"	210	Junior	Winnipeg, MB, Canada	LIU

=== 2026 recruiting class ===
College recruiting
Name	Hometown	School	Height	Weight	Commit date
Cade Murphy; SG	Knoxville, TN	Knoxville Catholic HS	6 ft 5 in (1.96 m)	195 lb (88 kg)	Nov 12, 2025
Cade Murphy; SG	Recruit ratings: (NR)				
Amari Owens; PG	Lexington, KY	Bryan Station HS	6 ft 1 in (1.85 m)	165 lb (75 kg)	Oct 17, 2025
Amari Owens; PG	Recruit ratings: (NR)				
Overall recruit ranking: Scout: – Rivals: –
Note: In many cases, Scout, Rivals, 247Sports, On3, and ESPN may conflict in their listings of height and weight.; In these cases, the average was taken. ESPN grades are on a 100-point scale.; Sources: "2026 Eastern Kentucky Basketball Recruiting Commits". Scout.; "Scout.com Team Recruiting Rankings". Scout.; "2026 Team Ranking". Rivals.

== Roster ==
2026–27 Eastern Kentucky Colonels men's basketball team
Players
Coaches

Pos.	#	Name	Height	Weight	Year	Previous school	Hometown
F	0	Duje Dujmovic	6 ft 9 in (2.06 m)	225 lb (102 kg)	Jr	Dragons Rhöndorf	Düsseldorf, Germany
G	1	Justin McCarter	6 ft 6 in (1.98 m)	190 lb (86 kg)	RS Jr	Northeastern Oklahoma A&M	Marietta, Georgia
G	2	Drae Vasser	6 ft 1 in (1.85 m)	200 lb (91 kg)	RS So	Vincennes	Louisville, Kentucky
G	3	Damone King	6 ft 2 in (1.88 m)	180 lb (82 kg)	RS So	Rhode Island	Louisville, Kentucky
F	4	Josh Lowe	6 ft 8 in (2.03 m)	210 lb (95 kg)	Jr	Moberly Area CC	Lewisville, Texas
G	5	Amari Owens	6 ft 1 in (1.85 m)	165 lb (75 kg)	Fr	Bryan Station HS	Lexington, Kentucky
G	10	Omer Hamama	6 ft 2 in (1.88 m)	190 lb (86 kg)	So	Kent State	Rishon LeZion, Israel
G	11	Jackson Holt	6 ft 4 in (1.93 m)	185 lb (84 kg)	RS Sr	Moravian Prep	Cincinnati, Ohio
F	12	Mouhamed Camara	6 ft 8 in (2.03 m)	225 lb (102 kg)	RS Fr	Louisville	Dakar, Senegal
G	13	Bobby Hardison	6 ft 5 in (1.96 m)	190 lb (86 kg)	So	Palm Beach Atlantic	Mooresville, North Carolina
F	14	Austin Ball	6 ft 7 in (2.01 m)	210 lb (95 kg)	RS Jr	George Mason	Man, West Virginia
G	15	Cade Murphy	6 ft 5 in (1.96 m)	195 lb (88 kg)	Fr	Knoxville Catholic HS	Knoxville, Tennessee
F	21	Yvens Paul	6 ft 7 in (2.01 m)	220 lb (100 kg)	RS Sr	Florida SouthWestern State	Naples, Florida
F	22	Shadrak Lasu	6 ft 8 in (2.03 m)	210 lb (95 kg)	Jr	LIU	Winnipeg, Manitoba, Canada
G	99	Mason Miles	6 ft 2 in (1.88 m)	184 lb (83 kg)	RS So	Lindsey Wilson	Louisville, Kentucky

Head coach

- A. W. Hamilton (Marshall)

Assistant coach(es)

- Steve Lepore (Wake Forest)
- Jake Lorbach (Ohio State)
- Ben Veshi (Catawba)
- Luchiano Gomez-Joseph (South Florida)

Legend

- (C) Team captain
- (S) Suspended
- (I) Ineligible
- (W) Walk-on
- Injured
- Current redshirt

Roster

== Schedule and results ==
Date time, TV	Rank^{#}	Opponent^{#}	Result	Record	High points	High rebounds	High assists	Site (attendance) city, state
Exhibition
October 21, 2026*; 7:00 p.m.		Morehead State	W 78–67		23 – Tied	11 – Lasu	5 – Owens	Baptist Health Arena; Richmond, KY
Non-conference regular season
November 2, 2026*; 7:00 p.m., ESPN+		Kentucky Christian	W 105–54	1–0	14 – King	10 – Paul	4 – Tied	Baptist Health Arena (1,050); Richmond, KY
November 7, 2026*; 7:00 p.m., ESPN+		Midway	W 106–68	2–0	17 – Holt	10 – Lasu	6 – Hamama	Baptist Health Arena (1,353); Richmond, KY
November 10, 2026*; 7:00 p.m., ACCNX		at Georgia Tech	L 71–85	2–1	20 – Tied	10 – Lasu	4 – Hamama	McCamish Pavilion (4,789); Atlanta, GA
November 13, 2026*; 7:00 p.m., ESPN+		Kentucky State						Baptist Health Arena; Richmond, KY
November 16, 2026*; 7:00 p.m., ESPN+		at Kent State						MAC Center; Kent, OH
November 20, 2026*; 7:00 p.m., ESPN+		Bellarmine; ASUN-UAC Crossover						Baptist Health Arena; Richmond, KY
November 22, 2026*; 4:00 p.m., ESPN+		Alice Lloyd						Baptist Health Arena; Richmond, KY
November 25, 2026*; 1:00 p.m., ESPN+		at Miami (OH)						Millett Hall; Oxford, OH
November 28, 2026*; 4:00 p.m., ESPN+		Tennessee Tech						Baptist Health Arena; Richmond, KY
December 2, 2026*; 7:00 p.m., ESPN+		UT Martin						Baptist Health Arena; Richmond, KY
December 6, 2026*; 4:00 p.m., SEC+		at Auburn						Neville Arena; Auburn, AL
December 13, 2026*; 4:00 p.m., ESPN+		Lipscomb; ASUN-UAC Crossover						Baptist Health Arena; Richmond, KY
December 18, 2026*; 7:00 p.m., ESPN+		South Dakota State						Baptist Health Arena; Richmond, KY
December 21, 2026*; 3:00 p.m., MW+		at Air Force						Clune Arena; Colorado Springs, CO
December 31, 2026*; 7:00 p.m., ESPN+		at West Florida; ASUN-UAC Crossover						PenAir Field House; Pensacola, FL
January 2, 2027*; 2:00 p.m., ESPN+		at Queens; ASUN-UAC Crossover						Curry Arena; Charlotte, NC
UAC regular season
January 6, 2027; 8:30 p.m., ESPN+		at Austin Peay						F&M Bank Arena; Clarksville, TN
January 9, 2027; 4:00 p.m., ESPN+		West Georgia						Baptist Health Arena; Richmond, KY
January 13, 2027; 8:00 p.m., ESPN+		Tarleton State						Baptist Health Arena; Richmond, KY
January 16, 2027; 4:00 p.m., ESPN+		North Alabama						Baptist Health Arena; Richmond, KY
January 20, 2027; 8:00 p.m., ESPN+		at Little Rock						Jack Stephens Center; Little Rock, AR
January 23, 2027; 2:00 p.m., ESPN+		at Central Arkansas						Farris Center; Conway, AR
January 30, 2027; 2:00 p.m., ESPN+		at West Georgia						The Coliseum; Carrollton, GA
February 3, 2027; 8:00 p.m., ESPN+		UT Arlington						Baptist Health Arena; Richmond, KY
February 6, 2027; 7:30 p.m., ESPN+		at North Alabama						CB&S Bank Arena; Florence, AL
February 10, 2027; 7:00 p.m., ESPN+		Central Arkansas						Baptist Health Arena; Richmond, KY
February 13, 2027; 4:00 p.m., ESPN+		at Abilene Christian						Baptist Health Arena; Richmond, KY
February 17, 2027; 7:00 p.m., ESPN+		Austin Peay						Baptist Health Arena; Richmond, KY
February 20, 2027; 5:15 p.m., ESPN+		at Tarleton State						EECU Center; Stephenville, TX
February 27, 2027; 4:00 p.m., ESPN+		Little Rock						Baptist Health Arena; Richmond, KY
March 3, 2027; 8:00 p.m., ESPN+		Abilene Christian						Moody Coliseum; Abilene, TX
March 6, 2027; 8:00 p.m., ESPN+		at UT Arlington						College Park Center; Arlington, TX
UAC tournament
March 10, 2027; TBD, TBD		vs. TBD						Credit Union of Texas Event Center; Allen, TX
*Non-conference game. ^{#}Rankings from AP Poll. (#) Tournament seedings in parentheses. All times are in Eastern Time.
