= 2026–27 Central Arkansas Bears basketball team =

American college basketball season

2026–27 Central Arkansas Bears basketball
- Conference: United Athletic Conference
- Record: 2–3 (0–0 UAC)
- Head coach: John Shulman (3rd season)
- Associate head coach: Brock Widders (3rd, 8th overall season)
- Assistant coaches: Max Shulman (3rd season); Ryan Montgomery (3rd season); Drake Henderson (1st season); Creighton Lebo (1st season)
- Home arena: Farris Center (Capacity: 6,000)

2026–27 United Athletic Conference men's basketball standings
	Conf.				Overall
Team	W		L	PCT	W		L	PCT
UT Arlington	0	–	0	–	6	–	1	.857
Eastern Kentucky	0	–	0	–	4	–	2	.667
North Alabama	0	–	0	–	4	–	2	.667
Tarleton State	0	–	0	–	4	–	2	.667
Austin Peay	0	–	0	–	3	–	2	.600
Abilene Christian	0	–	0	–	2	–	3	.400
Central Arkansas	0	–	0	–	2	–	3	.400
Little Rock	0	–	0	–	2	–	3	.400
West Georgia*	0	–	0	–	2	–	4	.333
† 2027 UAC tournament winner * ineligible for the 2027 NCAA tournament due to transition from Division II; As of November 21, 2026

The 2026–27 Central Arkansas Bears basketball team represents the University of Central Arkansas during the 2026–27 NCAA Division I men's basketball season. The Bears are led by third-year head coach John Shulman and play their home games at Farris Center in Conway, Arkansas as a member of the United Athletic Conference. This will also mark Central Arkansas's first season as members of the United Athletic Conference after spending the previous five seasons as members of the Atlantic Sun Conference.

== Previous season ==
Central Arkansas finished the 2025-26 season 22–12, 15–3 in the Atlantic Sun Conference to finish tied for first in the conference. As the 1-seed in the ASUN Tournament the Bears defeated 8-seed Bellarmine in the First round and 5-seed Florida Gulf Coast in the Semifinals to advance to the Championship. The Bears would fall in the championship to 3-seed Queens 93–98 in overtime to end their season.

=== Departures ===
Central Arkansas Bears departures
Name	Number	Pos.	Height	Weight	Year	Hometown	Reason for departure
Truman Byrne	0	F	6'9"	230	Freshman	Melbourne, Australia	Transferred to Lipscomb
Camren Hunter	1	G	6'3"	205	Senior	Bryant, AR	Out of eligibility
Javion Guy-King	2	G	6'6"	220	Junior	Little Rock, AR	Transferred to Ball State
Tyler Lee	5	G/F	6'5"	200	(redshirt) Freshman	Knoxville, TN	Transferred to Lincoln Memorial
Parker Applegate	13	G	6'8"	220	Junior	Murfreesboro, TN	Transferred to Gannon
Ethan Thomas	17	G	6'1"	185	Sophomore	Lebanon, TN	Transferred to Central Baptist
Chris Mason	23	F	6'7"	250	Sophomore	Tulsa, OK	Transferred to Oklahoma Baptist

=== Incoming transfers ===
Central Arkansas Bears incoming transfers
Name	Number	Pos.	Height	Weight	Year	Hometown	Previous School
Tucker Anderson	23	F	6'10"	230	Senior	Centerton, AR	Utah State
Simm-Marten Saadi	35	F	6'9"	255	Sophomore	Tallinn, Estonia	Wyoming

=== 2026 recruiting class ===
College recruiting
Name	Hometown	School	Height	Weight	Commit date
Camarion Bead; CG	Bryant, AR	Bryant HS	6 ft 2 in (1.88 m)	185 lb (84 kg)	Oct 14, 2025
Camarion Bead; CG	Recruit ratings: (NR)				
Andrew Hoerner; PF/C	Xenia, OH	Athletes in Action Prep	6 ft 8 in (2.03 m)	220 lb (100 kg)	Apr 28, 2026
Andrew Hoerner; PF/C	Recruit ratings: (NR)				
R.J. Young; SG/SF	Bryant, AR	Bryant HS	6 ft 4 in (1.93 m)	190 lb (86 kg)	Apr 8, 2026
R.J. Young; SG/SF	Recruit ratings: (NR)				
Overall recruit ranking: Scout: – Rivals: –
Note: In many cases, Scout, Rivals, 247Sports, On3, and ESPN may conflict in their listings of height and weight.; In these cases, the average was taken. ESPN grades are on a 100-point scale.; Sources: "2026 Central Arkansas Basketball Recruiting Commits". Scout.; "Scout.com Team Recruiting Rankings". Scout.; "2026 Team Ranking". Rivals.

== Roster ==
2026–27 Central Arkansas Bears men's basketball team
Players
Coaches

Pos.	#	Name	Height	Weight	Year	Previous school	Hometown
G	0	R.J. Young	6 ft 4 in (1.93 m)	190 lb (86 kg)	Fr	Bryant HS	Bryant, Arkansas
G	2	Camarion Bead	6 ft 2 in (1.88 m)	215 lb (98 kg)	Fr	Bryant HS	Bryant, Arkansas
G	3	Rylie Marshall	6 ft 3 in (1.91 m)	185 lb (84 kg)	RS Sr	Harding	Beebe, Arkansas
G	4	J.C. Shulman	6 ft 2 in (1.88 m)	200 lb (91 kg)	So	Conway HS	Chattanooga, Tennessee
G/F	5	Isaiah Templeton	6 ft 6 in (1.98 m)	220 lb (100 kg)	RS Fr	Morrilton HS	Morrilton, Arkansas
G	7	R.J. Newton	6 ft 4 in (1.93 m)	195 lb (88 kg)	RS Fr	Bryant HS	Bryant, Arkansas
G	9	Harry Beauchamp	6 ft 5 in (1.96 m)	205 lb (93 kg)	So	Marcellin College	Melbourne, Australia
G	10	Owen Dehrmann	6 ft 4 in (1.93 m)	195 lb (88 kg)	Jr	Bentonville HS	Bentonville, Arkansas
G	12	Ty Robinson	6 ft 4 in (1.93 m)	190 lb (86 kg)	RS So	Lake Hamilton HS	Hot Springs, Arkansas
F	23	Tucker Anderson	6 ft 10 in (2.08 m)	230 lb (104 kg)	Sr	Utah State	Centerton, Arkansas
G/F	24	Cole McCormick	6 ft 6 in (1.98 m)	215 lb (98 kg)	Jr	Notre Dame HS	Chattanooga, Tennessee
F	25	Malchiah Marable	6 ft 9 in (2.06 m)	245 lb (111 kg)	So	Hargrave Military Academy	Washington, District of Columbia
G	32	Luke Moore	6 ft 2 in (1.88 m)	180 lb (82 kg)	So	Little Rock Central HS	Little Rock, Arkansas
F	35	Simm-Marten Saadi	6 ft 9 in (2.06 m)	255 lb (116 kg)	So	Wyoming	Tallinn, Estonia
F	54	Andrew Hoerner	6 ft 8 in (2.03 m)	220 lb (100 kg)	Fr	Athletes in Action Prep	Miamisburg, Ohio

Head coach

- John Shulman (East Tennessee State)

Assistant coach(es)

- Brock Widders (Lyon)
- Max Shulman (Alabama–Huntsville)
- Ryan Montgomery (Lee)
- Drake Henderson (Central Baptist)
- Creighton Lebo (North Carolina)

Legend

- (C) Team captain
- (S) Suspended
- (I) Ineligible
- (W) Walk-on
- Injured
- Current redshirt

Roster

== Schedule and results ==
Date time, TV	Rank^{#}	Opponent^{#}	Result	Record	High points	High rebounds	High assists	Site (attendance) city, state
Non-conference regular season
November 2, 2026*; 7:30 p.m., ESPN+		Oral Roberts	W 85–55	1–0	29 – Robinson	7 – Saadi	6 – Moore	Farris Center (1,476); Conway, AR
November 6, 2026*; 7:30 p.m., SEC+		at Ole Miss	L 60–92	1–1	11 – Moore	5 – McCormick	5 – McCormick	SJB Pavilion (6,392); Oxford, MS
November 10, 2026*; 6:30 p.m., ESPN+		Ecclesia	W 127–54	2–1	19 – Templeton	8 – McCormick	8 – Hoerner	Farris Center (859); Conway, AR
November 13, 2026*; 7:00 p.m., SEC+		at No. 18 Arkansas	L 66–79	2–2	14 – Beauchamp	5 – Tied	5 – Robinson	Bud Walton Arena (19,200); Fayetteville, AR
November 16, 2026*; 7:00 p.m., ESPN+		at Oklahoma State	L 66–99	2–3	23 – Robinson	5 – Young	3 – Tied	Gallagher-Iba Arena (4,323); Stillwater, OK
November 21, 2026*; 3:00 p.m., ESPN+		at Jacksonville; ASUN-UAC Crossover						Swisher Gymnasium; Jacksonville, FL
November 23, 2026*; 6:00 p.m., ESPN+		at North Florida; ASUN-UAC Crossover						UNF Arena; Jacksonville, FL
November 28, 2026*; 1:00 p.m., ESPN+		Southwestern Christian						Farris Center; Conway, AR
December 2, 2026*; 7:00 p.m., ESPN+		at Houston						Fertitta Center; Houston, TX
December 5, 2026*; 1:00 p.m., ESPN+		Kansas Christian						Farris Center; Conway, AR
December 12, 2026*; 8:00 p.m., ESPN+		at Colorado						CU Events Center; Boulder, CO
December 15, 2026*; 6:30 p.m., ESPN+		East Texas A&M						Farris Center; Conway, AR
December 17, 2026*; 6:30 p.m., ESPN+		Champion Christian						Farris Center; Conway, AR
December 19, 2026*; 7:00 p.m., SLN		at Oral Roberts						Mabee Center; Tulsa, OK
December 28, 2026*; 6:30 p.m., ESPN+		Stetson; ASUN-UAC Crossover						Farris Center; Conway, AR
December 31, 2027*; 1:00 p.m., ESPN+		Florida Gulf Coast; ASUN-UAC Crossover						Farris Center; Conway, AR
UAC regular season
January 6, 2027; 7:00 p.m., ESPN+		at Tarleton State						EECU Center; Stephenville, TX
January 9, 2027; 2:00 p.m., ESPN+		at UT Arlington						College Park Center; Arlington, TX
January 13, 2027; 7:00 p.m., ESPN+		at Abilene Christian						Farris Center; Conway, AR
January 16, 2027; 1:00 p.m., ESPN+		West Georgia						Farris Center; Conway, AR
January 20, 2027; 7:00 p.m., ESPN+		at Austin Peay						F&M Bank Arena; Clarksville, TN
January 23, 2027; 1:00 p.m., ESPN+		Eastern Kentucky						Farris Center; Conway, AR
January 27, 2027; 7:30 p.m., ESPN+		North Alabama						Farris Center; Conway, AR
February 3, 2027; 7:00 p.m., ESPN+		Abilene Christian						Moody Coliseum; Abilene, TX
February 6, 2027; 7:00 p.m., ESPN+		at Little Rock; Governor's I-40 Showdown						Jack Stephens Center; Little Rock, AR
February 10, 2027; 6:00 p.m., ESPN+		at Eastern Kentucky						Baptist Health Arena; Richmond, KY
February 17, 2027; 7:30 p.m., ESPN+		Tarleton State						Farris Center; Conway, AR
February 20, 2027; 1:00 p.m., ESPN+		Little Rock; Governor's I-40 Showdown						Farris Center; Conway, AR
February 24, 2027; 7:45 p.m., ESPN+		at North Alabama						CB&S Bank Arena; Florence, AL
February 27, 2027; 1:00 p.m., ESPN+		at West Georgia						The Coliseum; Carrollton, GA
March 3, 2027; 6:30 p.m., ESPN+		UT Arlington						Farris Center; Conway, AR
March 6, 2027; 3:30 p.m., ESPN+		at Austin Peay						Farris Center; Conway, AR
UAC tournament
March 10, 2027; TBD, TBD		vs. TBD						Credit Union of Texas Event Center; Allen, TX
*Non-conference game. ^{#}Rankings from AP Poll. (#) Tournament seedings in parentheses. All times are in Central Time.
