= 2026–27 UT Arlington Mavericks men's basketball team =

American college basketball season

2026–27 UT Arlington Mavericks men's basketball
- Conference: United Athletic Conference
- Record: 4–1 (0–0 UAC)
- Head coach: K. T. Turner (4th season)
- Assistant coaches: Sean Stout (4th season); Derrick Obasohan (3rd season); Wendell Moore (1st season); Jerrance Howard (1st season); BJ Letcher (1st season)
- Home arena: College Park Center (Capacity: 7,250)

2026–27 United Athletic Conference men's basketball standings
	Conf.				Overall
Team	W		L	PCT	W		L	PCT
UT Arlington	0	–	0	–	5	–	1	.833
Eastern Kentucky	0	–	0	–	4	–	1	.800
Tarleton State	0	–	0	–	4	–	1	.800
Austin Peay	0	–	0	–	3	–	2	.600
North Alabama	0	–	0	–	3	–	2	.600
Abilene Christian	0	–	0	–	2	–	3	.400
Central Arkansas	0	–	0	–	2	–	3	.400
Little Rock	0	–	0	–	1	–	3	.250
West Georgia*	0	–	0	–	1	–	4	.200
† 2027 UAC tournament winner * ineligible for the 2027 NCAA tournament due to transition from Division II; As of November 19, 2026

The 2026–27 UT Arlington Mavericks men's basketball team represent the University of Texas at Arlington during the 2026–27 NCAA Division I men's basketball season. The Mavericks are led by fourth-year head coach K. T. Turner and play their home games at College Park Center in Arlington, Texas as a member of the United Athletic Conference. This will mark UT Arlington's first season as members of the re-branded United Athletic Conference after spending the previous four seasons as members of the Western Athletic Conference.

== Previous season ==
UT Arlington finished the 2025-26 season 18–14, 9–9 in the Western Athletic Conference to finish fourth in the conference. As the 4-seed in the WAC Tournament the Mavericks defeated 5-seed Southern Utah in the Quarterfinals before falling to top-seed Utah Valley in the Semifinals 65–67 to end their season.

=== Departures ===
UT Arlington Mavericks departures
Name	Number	Pos.	Height	Weight	Year	Hometown	Reason for departure
Jordan Lowery	0	G	6'1"	170	Freshman	Denton, TX	Transferred to Cleveland State
Cash Chavis	1	G	6'2"	180	Sophomore	Minneapolis, MN	Transferred to North Texas
Raysean Seamster	2	F	6'7"	200	Senior	Portland, OR	Out of eligibility
Tyran Mason	3	G	6'6"	195	Sophomore	Plano, TX	Transferred to East Tennessee State
Marcus Rigsby Jr.	4	G	6'3"	200	Senior	Fort Worth, TX	Out of eligibility
Alex Bossinakis	7	G	6'2"	200	(redshirt) Junior	North Richland Hills, TX	Transferred to UT Tyler
Bahsil Laster	8	G	6'4"	180	Sophomore	Philadelphia, PA	Transferred to Norfolk State
Jayden Smoot	11	G	6'1"	180	Freshman	Los Angeles, CA	Entered transfer portal
Augustine Youssef	12	G	6'0"	190	Freshman	Indio, CA	Transferred to Hope International
Amari Reed	33	F/C	6'8"	210	Freshman	Lancaster, TX	Transferred to Stephen F. Austin
Cameron Jackson	34	F/C	6'8"	240	Sophomore	Pflugerville, TX	Transferred to Radford
Marcell McCreary	42	G	6'4"	225	Senior	Fort Worth, TX	Out of eligibility

=== Incoming transfers ===
UT Arlington Mavericks incoming transfers
Name	Number	Pos.	Height	Weight	Year	Hometown	Previous School
Kajus Mikalauskas	0	F	6'7"	180	Freshman	Klaipėda, Lithuania	BC Žalgiris
Noah Shelby	2	G	6'3"	190	Senior	McKinney, TX	Texas A&M
Mier Panoam	3	G	6'2"	200	Senior	Anchorage, AK	Xavier
Tristan Hankins	4	G	6'2"	185	Sophomore	Idabel, OK	Butler CC
Jerimiyah Smith	7	G	6'5"	215	Junior	Los Angeles, CA	Ventura College
Tycen McDaniels	8	F	6'8"	200	Senior	Columbus, GA	Alcorn State
Niko Bundalo	11	F	6'10"	215	Junior	Canton, OH	Ole Miss
Teodor Simic	15	F	7'1"	250	Freshman	Gevgelija, North Macedonia	KK Kožuv
Bryson McGlothin	35	F	6'8"	190	(redshirt) Sophomore	Plano, TX	Richmond

=== 2026 recruiting class ===
College recruiting
Name	Hometown	School	Height	Weight	Commit date
Trevaun Clark; SF	San Antonio, TX	Karen Wagner HS	6 ft 7 in (2.01 m)	185 lb (84 kg)	Aug 23, 2025
Trevaun Clark; SF	Recruit ratings: On3: ESPN: (80)				
Jayden Parker; CG	Plano, TX	Plano East Senior HS	6 ft 0 in (1.83 m)	165 lb (75 kg)	Apr 26, 2026
Jayden Parker; CG	Recruit ratings: (NR)				
Josh Montgomery; CG	San Antonio, TX	Ronald Reagan HS	6 ft 0 in (1.83 m)	170 lb (77 kg)	
Josh Montgomery; CG	Recruit ratings: (NR)				
Overall recruit ranking: Scout: – Rivals: –
Note: In many cases, Scout, Rivals, 247Sports, On3, and ESPN may conflict in their listings of height and weight.; In these cases, the average was taken. ESPN grades are on a 100-point scale.; Sources: "2026 UT Arlington Basketball Recruiting Commits". Scout.; "Scout.com Team Recruiting Rankings". Scout.; "2026 Team Ranking". Rivals.

== Roster ==
2026–27 UT Arlington Mavericks men's basketball team
Players
Coaches

Pos.	#	Name	Height	Weight	Year	Previous school	Hometown
F	0	Trevaun Clark	6 ft 7 in (2.01 m)	180 lb (82 kg)	Fr	Karen Wagner HS	San Antonio, Texas
G	1	Kajus Mikalauskas	6 ft 3 in (1.91 m)	185 lb (84 kg)	Fr	BC Žalgiris	Klaipėda, Lithuania
G	2	Noah Shelby	6 ft 3 in (1.91 m)	190 lb (86 kg)	Sr	Texas A&M	McKinney, Texas
G	3	Mier Panoam	6 ft 2 in (1.88 m)	200 lb (91 kg)	Sr	Xavier	Anchorage, Alaska
G	4	Tristan Hankins	6 ft 2 in (1.88 m)	185 lb (84 kg)	So	Butler CC	Idabel, Oklahoma
F/C	5	Miles Goodman	7 ft 0 in (2.13 m)	225 lb (102 kg)	Jr	Penn State	Seattle, Washington
G	7	Jerimiyah Smith	6 ft 5 in (1.96 m)	215 lb (98 kg)	Jr	Ventura College	Los Angeles, California
F	8	Tycen McDaniels	6 ft 8 in (2.03 m)	200 lb (91 kg)	Sr	Alcorn State	Columbus, Georgia
G	10	Jayden Parker	6 ft 0 in (1.83 m)	165 lb (75 kg)	Fr	Plano East Senior HS	Plano, Texas
F	11	Niko Bundalo	6 ft 10 in (2.08 m)	215 lb (98 kg)	So	Ole Miss	Canton, Ohio
F	15	Teodor Simic	7 ft 1 in (2.16 m)	250 lb (113 kg)	Jr	KK Kožuv	Gevgelija, North Macedonia
G	16	Josh Montgomery (W)	6 ft 0 in (1.83 m)	170 lb (77 kg)	Fr	Ronald Reagan HS	San Antonio, Texas
F	21	Stoney Hadnot	6 ft 6 in (1.98 m)	200 lb (91 kg)	RS So	South Dakota State	Houston, Texas
F	35	Bryson McGlothin	6 ft 8 in (2.03 m)	190 lb (86 kg)	RS So	Richmond	Plano, Texas

Head coach

- K. T. Turner (Oklahoma City)

Assistant coach(es)

- Sean Stout (North Carolina)
- Derrick Obasohan (UT Arlington)
- Wendell Moore (Georgia Southern)
- Jerrance Howard (Illinois)
- BJ Letcher (Justice)

Legend

- (C) Team captain
- (S) Suspended
- (I) Ineligible
- (W) Walk-on
- Injured
- Current redshirt

Roster

== Schedule and results ==
Date time, TV	Rank^{#}	Opponent^{#}	Result	Record	High points	High rebounds	High assists	Site (attendance) city, state
Non-conference regular season
November 2, 2026*; 7:00 p.m., ESPN+		UNT Dallas	W 89–56	1–0	17 – Shelby	12 – Bundalo	6 – Smith	College Park Center (828); Arlington, TX
November 6, 2026*; 9:30 p.m., MW+		vs. Portland; Rainbow Classic	W 89–85	2–0	24 – Simic	7 – Hankins	7 – Hankins	Stan Sheriff Center (–); Honolulu, HI
November 8, 2026*; 10:00 p.m., MW+		at Hawaii; Rainbow Classic	L 62–71	2–1	23 – Hankins	9 – Bundalo	2 – Tied	Stan Sheriff Center (4,325); Honolulu, HI
November 9, 2026*; 9:30 p.m., MW+		vs. Bethesda; Rainbow Classic	W 116–65	3–1	22 – Shelby	17 – Tied	8 – Panoam	Stan Sheriff Center (–); Honolulu, HI
November 14, 2026*; 6:00 p.m., ESPN+		UT Rio Grande Valley	W 85–77	4–1	25 – Shelby	10 – Simic	7 – Hankins	College Park Center (2,449); Arlington, TX
November 17, 2026*; 7:00 p.m., TBD		at Southern Miss	W 83–72	5–1	26 – Hankins	10 – Hankins	4 – Hankins	Reed Green Coliseum (2,671); Hattiesburg, MS
November 20, 2026*; 6:30 p.m., TBD		at Northwestern State						Prather Coliseum; Natchitoches, LA
November 24, 2026*; 7:00 p.m., ESPN+		Oral Roberts						College Park Center; Arlington, TX
December 1, 2026*; 8:00 p.m., MW+		at Colorado State						Moby Arena; Fort Collins, CO
December 1, 2026*; 6:00 p.m., MW+		at Stephen F. Austin						William R. Johnson Coliseum; Nacogdoches, TX
December 13, 2026*; 4:00 p.m., SEC+		at Arkansas						Bud Walton Arena; Fayetteville, AR
December 15, 2026*; 11:00 a.m., ESPN+		LeTourneau						College Park Center; Arlington, TX
December 19, 2026*; 5:00 p.m., ESPN+		North Florida; ASUN-UAC Crossover						College Park Center; Arlington, TX
December 21, 2026*; 12:00 p.m., ESPN+		Arlington Baptist						College Park Center; Arlington, TX
December 31, 2026*; 2:00 p.m., ESPN+		Jacksonville; ASUN-UAC Crossover						College Park Center; Arlington, TX
January 2, 2027*; 1:00 p.m., ESPN+		at Stetson; ASUN-UAC Crossover						Insight Credit Union Arena; DeLand, FL
January 5, 2027*; 6:00 p.m., ESPN+		at Florida Gulf Coast; ASUN-UAC Crossover						Alico Arena; Fort Myers, FL
UAC regular season
January 9, 2027; 2:00 p.m., ESPN+		Central Arkansas						College Park Center; Arlington, TX
January 13, 2027; 7:00 p.m., ESPN+		Austin Peay						College Park Center; Arlington, TX
January 16, 2027; 2:00 p.m., ESPN+		at Abilene Christian						Moody Coliseum; Abilene, TX
January 20, 2027; 6:00 p.m., ESPN+		at West Georgia						The Coliseum; Carrollton, GA
January 23, 2027; 5:00 p.m., ESPN+		at North Alabama						CB&S Bank Arena; Florence, AL
January 27, 2027; 7:00 p.m., ESPN+		Little Rock						College Park Center; Arlington, TX
January 30, 2027; 5:00 p.m., ESPN+		Abilene Christian						College Park Center; Arlington, TX
February 3, 2027; 7:00 p.m., ESPN+		at Eastern Kentucky						Baptist Health Arena; Richmond, KY
February 6, 2027; 4:30 p.m., ESPN+		at Austin Peay						F&M Bank Arena; Clarksville, TN
February 13, 2027; 5:00 p.m., ESPN+		Tarleton State						College Park Center; Arlington, TX
February 17, 2027; 8:00 p.m., ESPN+		West Georgia						College Park Center; Arlington, TX
February 20, 2027; 2:00 p.m., ESPN+		North Alabama						College Park Center; Arlington, TX
February 24, 2027; TBD, ESPN+		at Little Rock						Jack Stephens Center; Little Rock, AR
February 27, 2027; TBD, ESPN+		at Tarleton State						EECU Center; Stephenville, TX
March 3, 2027; 6:30 p.m., ESPN+		at Central Arkansas						Farris Center; Conway, AR
March 6, 2027; 7:00 p.m., ESPN+		Eastern Kentucky						College Park Center; Arlington, TX
UAC tournament
March 10, 2027; TBD, TBD		vs. TBD						Credit Union of Texas Event Center; Allen, TX
*Non-conference game. ^{#}Rankings from AP Poll. (#) Tournament seedings in parentheses. All times are in Central Time.
