= 2026–27 West Florida Argonauts men's basketball team =

American college basketball season

2026–27 West Florida Argonauts men's basketball
- Conference: Atlantic Sun Conference
- Record: 2–1 (0–0 ASUN)
- Head coach: Tanner Smith (1st season)
- Associate head coach: Patrick Corrigan
- Assistant coach: Raheem Martin
- Home arena: PenAir Field House

2026–27 ASUN men's basketball standings
	Conf.				Overall
Team	W		L	PCT	W		L	PCT
Jacksonville	0	–	0	–	2	–	1	.667
Lipscomb	0	–	0	–	2	–	2	.500
Queens	0	–	0	–	2	–	2	.500
West Florida*	0	–	0	–	2	–	2	.500
Florida Gulf Coast	0	–	0	–	1	–	2	.333
North Florida	0	–	0	–	1	–	2	.333
Bellarmine	0	–	0	–	1	–	3	.250
Stetson	0	–	0	–	0	–	4	.000
† 2027 ASUN tournament winner * ineligible for the 2027 NCAA tournament due to transition from Division II; As of November 13, 2026; Rankings from AP poll

The 2026–27 West Florida Argonauts men's basketball team represent the University of West Florida during the 2026–27 NCAA Division I men's basketball season. The Argonauts, led by first-year head coach Tanner Smith, play their home games at the newly renamed PenAir Field House in Pensacola, Florida as first-year members of the Atlantic Sun Conference.

== Previous season ==
The Argonauts finished the 2025–26 season 25–9, 15–7 in Gulf South Conference play, to finish in a tie for third place. They would go on to win the Gulf South tournament to earn the conference's bid to the 2026 NCAA Division II tournament. As the #6 seed in the South regional, they would lose to #3 seed and fellow Gulf South Conference rival West Alabama in the first round.

On April 2, 2026, it was announced that West Florida would begin a three-year transition period from Division II to Division I. As a result, the Argonauts are ineligible for the NCAA Tournament until the 2029–30 season, at the earliest.

== Preseason ==
On October 27, 2026, the Atlantic Sun Conference released their preseason poll. West Florida was picked to finish eighth in the conference.

=== Preseason rankings ===
ASUN Preseason Poll
Place	Team
1	Queens (5)
2	Jacksonville (2)
3	Lipscomb
4	Bellarmine
5	Florida Gulf Coast
6	Stetson
7	North Florida (1)
8	West Florida
(#) first-place votes

=== Preseason All-ASUN Team ===
No players were named to the Preseason All-ASUN Team.

== Roster ==
2026–27 West Florida Argonauts men's basketball team
Players
Coaches

Pos.	#	Name	Height	Weight	Year	Previous school	Hometown
F	0	Tim Hall Jr.	6 ft 7 in (2.01 m)	210 lb (95 kg)	Sr	Georgia Southwestern	Charlotte, North Carolina
G	1	Jay King	6 ft 2 in (1.88 m)	185 lb (84 kg)	Sr	Tallahassee State College	Macon, Georgia
G	2	DJ Shine	6 ft 2 in (1.88 m)	190 lb (86 kg)	Jr	Northwest Florida State College	Augusta, Georgia
G	3	Alex Godley Jr.	6 ft 5 in (1.96 m)	185 lb (84 kg)	Sr	Wingate	Burlington, North Carolina
G	4	Eze Wali	6 ft 1 in (1.85 m)	185 lb (84 kg)	Jr	The Citadel	Providence, Rhode Island
F	5	Jordan Samuel	6 ft 7 in (2.01 m)	210 lb (95 kg)	So	Winder-Barrow High School	Atlanta, Georgia
G/F	6	Trajan Thompson	6 ft 6 in (1.98 m)	190 lb (86 kg)	RS Fr	Denver	Charlotte, North Carolina
G	7	Rodrigo Farias	6 ft 2 in (1.88 m)	175 lb (79 kg)	Jr	Ferrum College	Queens, New York
G/F	8	Daylon Dickerson	6 ft 6 in (1.98 m)	205 lb (93 kg)	Sr	UMBC	Kaufman, Texas
G/F	10	Isaiah Alexander	6 ft 7 in (2.01 m)	195 lb (88 kg)	RS Sr	Minot State	Bronx, New York
G	11	Hutson Rowe	6 ft 1 in (1.85 m)	175 lb (79 kg)	RS Fr	Gulf Breeze High School	Gulf Breeze, Florida
G	21	Christian Monroe	6 ft 4 in (1.93 m)	200 lb (91 kg)	Sr	Erskine College	Mooresville, North Carolina
F	23	Sano Rutatika	6 ft 9 in (2.06 m)	230 lb (104 kg)	RS Sr	Lake Forest Academy	Kigali, Rwanda
G/F	24	Oluwatomisin Ayodele-Osho	6 ft 2 in (1.88 m)	185 lb (84 kg)	Fr	Bella Vista Prep	Sydney, Australia
G	32	Christian Valarezo	6 ft 2 in (1.88 m)	195 lb (88 kg)	RS Sr	Gulf Coast State	Milton, Florida

Head coach

- Tanner Smith (Clemson)

Assistant coach(es)

- Patrick Corrigan (Hampden–Sydney)
- Raheem Martin (Greensboro)

Legend

- (C) Team captain
- (S) Suspended
- (I) Ineligible
- (W) Walk-on
- Injured
- Current redshirt

Roster
Last update: October 12, 2026

== Schedule and results ==
Date time, TV	Rank^{#}	Opponent^{#}	Result	Record	Site (attendance) city, state
Non-conference regular season
November 2, 2026*; 7:00 p.m., ESPN+		Southeastern Baptist	W 127–42	1–0	PenAir Field House (391); Pensacola, FL
November 6, 2026*; 4:00 pm, ESPN+		at FIU	L 75–85	1–1	Ocean Bank Convocation Center (698); Miami, FL
November 9, 2026*; 6:00 pm, ESPN+		Baptist (FL)	W 110–59	2–1	PenAir Field House (352); Pensacola, FL
November 12, 2026*; 7:00 pm, SWAC TV		at Alabama A&M; Bulldog Bash	L 83–85	2–2	AAMU Event Center (1,109); Huntsville, AL
November 13, 2026*; 2:00 pm		vs. Cleveland State; Bulldog Bash			AAMU Event Center; Huntsville, AL
November 17, 2026*; 6:00 pm, ESPN+		Green Bay			PenAir Field House; Pensacola, FL
November 22, 2026*; 2:00 pm, ESPN+		at South Alabama			Mitchell Center; Mobile, AL
November 25, 2026*; 5:00 pm, ESPN+		at Northwestern State			Prather Coliseum; Natchitoches, LA
November 29, 2026*; 2:00 pm, ACCNX		vs. Florida State; Battle at the Bay			Pensacola Bay Center; Pensacola, FL
December 2, 2026*; 6:00 pm, ESPN+		at South Florida			Yuengling Center; Tampa, FL
December 5, 2026*; 1:00 pm, ESPN+		Pensacola Christian			PenAir Field House; Pensacola, FL
December 13, 2026*; 12:00 pm, ESPN+		Navy			PenAir Field House; Pensacola, FL
December 16, 2026*; 6:00 pm, ESPN+		Alabama State			PenAir Field House; Pensacola, FL
December 19, 2026*; 2:00 pm		at West Georgia			The Coliseum; Carrollton, GA
December 21, 2026*; 6:00 pm		at North Alabama			CB&S Bank Arena; Florence, AL
December 28, 2026*; 7:00 pm, ESPN+		at Tarleton State			EECU Center; Stephenville, TX
December 31, 2026*; 6:00 pm, ESPN+		Eastern Kentucky			PenAir Field House; Pensacola, FL
January 2, 2027*; 1:00 pm, ESPN+		Austin Peay			PenAir Field House; Pensacola, FL
ASUN regular season
January 9, 2027; 2:30 pm, ESPN+		Queens			PenAir Field House; Pensacola, FL
January 14, 2027; 6:00 pm, ESPN+		North Florida			PenAir Field House; Pensacola, FL
January 16, 2027; 1:00 pm, ESPN+		Jacksonville			PenAir Field House; Pensacola, FL
January 21, 2027; 6:00 pm, ESPN+		at Florida Gulf Coast			Alico Arena; Fort Myers, FL
January 23, 2027; 1:00 pm, ESPN+		at Stetson			Insight Credit Union Arena; DeLand, FL
January 28, 2027; 6:00 pm, ESPN+		Lipscomb			PenAir Field House; Pensacola, FL
January 30, 2027; 1:00 pm, ESPN+		Bellarmine			PenAir Field House; Pensacola, FL
February 6, 2027; 3:00 pm, ESPN+		at Queens			Curry Arena; Charlotte, NC
February 11, 2027; 6:00 pm, ESPN+		at Jacksonville			Swisher Gymnasium; Jacksonville, FL
February 13, 2027; 1:00 pm, ESPN+		at North Florida			UNF Arena; Jacksonville, FL
February 18, 2027; 6:00 pm, ESPN+		Stetson			PenAir Field House; Pensacola, FL
February 20, 2027; 1:00 pm, ESPN+		Florida Gulf Coast			PenAir Field House; Pensacola, FL
February 25, 2027; 6:00 pm, ESPN+		at Bellarmine			Knights Hall; Louisville, KY
February 27, 2027; 4:00 pm, ESPN+		at Lipscomb			Allen Arena; Nashville, TN
*Non-conference game. ^{#}Rankings from AP poll. (#) Tournament seedings in parentheses. All times are in Eastern.
