= Dave Moore (basketball) =

American college basketball coach

Current position
- Title: Head coach
- Team: West Georgia
- Conference: UAC
- Record: 125–114 (.523)

Biographical details
- Born: February 8, 1975 (age 51); Cincinnati, Ohio, U.S.

Playing career
- 1993–1997: Bethel

Coaching career (HC unless noted)
- 1997–1998: Bethel (assistant)
- 1998–2000: Mount St. Joseph (assistant)
- 2000–2002: Christian Brothers (assistant)
- 2006–2007: Robert Morris (assistant)
- 2007–2018: St. Bonaventure (assistant)
- 2018–present: West Georgia

Head coaching record
- Overall: 125–114 (.523)
- Tournaments: 3–3 (NCAA Division II)

Accomplishments and honors

Championships
- Gulf South regular season (2024); Gulf South tournament (2024)

Awards
- 2× Gulf South Coach of the Year (2021, 2024)

Dave Moore (born February 8, 1975) is an American college basketball coach. He is currently the head coach of the West Georgia Wolves men's basketball team.

== Career ==
Moore attended Oak Hills High School and played college basketball at Bethel University before beginning his coaching career. Following stints coaching at Bethel, Mount St. Joseph, Lakota East High School, and Robert Morris, Moore joined the St. Bonaventure coaching staff in 2007 as an assistant coach. With St. Bonaventure, he served as an assistant coach under Mark Schmidt for 11 years. After spending 20 years as an assistant coach, Moore was named the next head coach at West Georgia in April 2018. In the 2023–24 season, he led West Georgia to becoming the Gulf South Conference regular season and tournament champions, with a record of 27–6. As a result, he was named the 2024 Gulf South Coach of the Year.

== Head coaching record ==
Record table
Season	Team	Overall	Conference	Standing	Postseason
West Georgia Wolves (GSC) (2018–2024)
2018–19	West Georgia	17–12	12–8	6th	
2019–20	West Georgia	9–19	7–13	11th	
2020–21	West Georgia	14–8	12–6	3rd (East)	NCAA Division II Second Round
2021–22	West Georgia	15–13	12–8	5th	
2022–23	West Georgia	21–10	17–7	4th	NCAA Division II Second Round
2023–24	West Georgia	27–6	19–5	1st	NCAA Division II Second Round
West Georgia (GSC):		103–68 (.602)	79–47 (.627)		
West Georgia Wolves (ASUN) (2024–2026)
2024–25	West Georgia	6–25	4–14	T–10th	
2025–26	West Georgia	15–17	8–10	T–5th	
West Georgia (ASUN):		21–42 (.333)	12–24 (.333)		
West Georgia Wolves (UAC) (2026–present)
2026–27	West Georgia	1–4	0–0		
West Georgia (UAC):		1–4 (.200)	0–0 (–)		
Total:		125–114 (.523)			
National champion Postseason invitational champion Conference regular season champion Conference regular season and conference tournament champion Division regular season champion Division regular season and conference tournament champion Conference tournament champion
