= A. W. Hamilton =

American college basketball coach (born 1980)

A. W. Hamilton VI
Current position
- Title: Head coach
- Team: Eastern Kentucky
- Conference: UAC
- Record: 138–125 (.525)

Biographical details
- Born: October 15, 1980 (age 46); Georgetown, Kentucky, U.S.

Playing career
- 2000–2001: Wake Forest
- 2002–2005: Marshall

Coaching career (HC unless noted)
- 2005–2006: Marshall (GA)
- 2006–2011: Hargrave Military Academy (assistant)
- 2011–2017: Hargrave Military Academy
- 2017–2018: NC State (assistant)
- 2018–present: Eastern Kentucky

Head coaching record
- Overall: 375–147 (.718)
- Tournaments: 3–1 (CBI)

Accomplishments and honors

Championships
- Atlantic Sun regular season (2024)

Awards
- Ohio Valley Conference Coach of the Year (2020); Atlantic Sun Coach of the Year (2024); NABC District 18 Coach of the Year (2020); NABC District 3 Coach of the Year (2024)

Archibald William Hamilton VI (born October 15, 1980) is an American basketball coach and former player. He is the head men's basketball coach at Eastern Kentucky University, a position he has held since 2018. Hamilton served as the head basketball coach at Hargrave Military Academy in Chatham, Virginia, from 2011 to 2017. Born in Georgetown, Kentucky, he played college basketball for Wake Forest and Marshall, where he graduated in 2005.

== Playing career ==
Hamilton starred at Scott County High School under coach Billy Hicks from 1996 to 1999, earning four varsity letters. He helped lead the Cardinals to the 1998 Kentucky state basketball championship before helping guide them to a state runner-up finish in 1999. Hamilton was named 1st team Kentucky All-State in 1999 as well as Kentucky's 8th Region Co-Player of the Year.

Following his career at Scott County, Hamilton played a postgraduate year at Hargrave Military Academy, beginning a relationship with head coach Kevin Keatts. Hamilton averaged 17.9 points, 9.6 assists and 7.0 rebounds per game for Hargrave before signing a full basketball scholarship with Wake Forest.

Hamilton appeared in 19 games for the Demon Deacons in the 2000–01 season, and 4 games in the 2001–02 season before transferring to Marshall for the 2002–03 season. Hamilton went on to play 82 games for the Thundering Herd between 2002 and 2005, starting 81 of them. He averaged 33.9 minutes per game, 8.4 points per game, 5.0 assists per game and 1.3 steals per game during his Marshall Career. Hamilton's name is littered throughout the Marshall All-Time record book, as he currently ranks 10th all-time in career assists (411), 13th in career 3pt% (38.6%), 21st in career steals (107) and 31st in career 3pt field goals made (83). Hamilton led Marshall in assists and steals each season he played for the Thundering Herd.

On September 4, 2015, Hamilton was inducted to the Scott County Sports Hall of Fame.

== Coaching career ==
=== Marshall University ===
Following graduation from Marshall in 2005, Hamilton joined the Marshall staff as graduate assistant for Coach Ron Jirsa. After one year as a graduate assistant, Hamilton returned home to Hargrave Academy to be an assistant coach in 2006.

=== Hargrave Military Academy ===
After serving as an assistant under Kevin Keatts for five years, Hamilton took over the Hargrave program as the head coach in 2011. During his time as head coach (2011–2017), Hamilton compiled 237 wins and 22 losses. In 2016, he led his team to a 47–1 record and won the 2016 National Prep Championship. Hamilton helped get 63 of his players to NCAA Division I and 25 to NCAA Division II colleges over his six years in charge. Two of his players were drafted in the 2015 NBA Draft, Terry Rozier (#16 to the Boston Celtics) and Montrezl Harrell (#32 to the Houston Rockets). Hamilton's accolades while at Hargrave include National Prep Coach of the Year (2012, 2016), East Region Coach of the Year (2014, 2015, 2017), Program of the Decade (2012), six Nation Prep Elite Eight appearances, and three National Prep Final Fours, along with his 91.5 win percentage. Hamilton was twice awarded Hargrave's O.B. Teague Coach of the Year award, which is presented to the academy's top overall athletic coach, in 2012 and 2016. On September 21, 2017, Hamilton was inducted into the Hargrave Military Academy Basketball Hall of Fame. Hamilton was named Hargrave Coach of the Decade for the 2010s. Kyle Goon of the San Bernardino Sun said, "Hamilton was Hargrave's Phil Jackson."

=== North Carolina State University ===
Hamilton reunited with head coach Kevin Keatts in Raleigh, North Carolina, at NC State as an assistant coach in 2017. In his lone year at NC State, Hamilton was part of landing a top 10 recruiting class, helped the Wolfpack finish tied for 3rd in the ACC, and secured an NCAA Tournament at-large selection bid.

=== Eastern Kentucky University ===
==== 2018–19 ====
On March 23, 2018, Hamilton was announced as the 21st Head Coach at Eastern Kentucky University. Hamilton established his brand, "Most Exciting 40 Minutes in Sports", or the modern day "40 Minutes of Hell". In Hamilton's home opener he broke a decade long attendance record in a game vs his alma mater Marshall University with a fan attendance of 5,189. Hamilton's first collegiate win came on November 10, 2018, at UT-Chattanooga behind Nick Mayo's 40 point performance to top the Moc's 81–78. "Most Exciting 40 Minutes in Sports" became a national headline when his team scored an Ohio Valley Conference record 87 points in a half, and an EKU record 145 points in a game on December 29, 2018, vs Brescia College. Hamilton broke this record 14 games later. On February 16, 2018, 5,640 fans attended the game vs Murray State. In his first year at charge, his team ranked 2nd according to KenPom in the NCAA Division I in Tempo/Pace, Forced Turnovers (18.2), Steals Per Game (10.2), and 13th in Scoring. EKU averaged 82.7 Points Per Game during the 2018–19 Campaign, the most points averaged by a Colonel team since 1987.

==== 2019–20 ====
In his second season, Hamilton's Colonels recorded a 9–2 start in OVC play, the best start since 1978–79 (41 years) by an EKU team. During the stretch the Colonels won 6 straight games, the most consecutive wins in conference since the 2007 season. The Colonels finished up conference play 12–6 and secure a 4th seed in the OVC tournament, the first tournament appearance since 2014, and made it to the semi-finals. Hamilton installed a fast-paced offense and pressure defense that saw the Colonels rank 5th in the NCAA Division I in Forced Turnovers (18.3), 7th in Steals Per Game (9.3) and 10th in Turnover Margin (+4.3) in the 2019–2020 season. Because of his continued success at EKU, Hamilton was named OVC Coach of the Year by his peers and National Association of Basketball Coaches (NABC) District 18 Coach of the Year, the first coach at Eastern Kentucky University to win this award.

In the year 2020, EKU led all NCAA Division I programs in the state of Kentucky for most wins. The Colonels had 21 wins during 2020, followed by: WKU (20), Murray St. (20), UL (19), UK (17), NKU (17), Bellarmine (13), Morehead St. (11)

==== 2020–21 ====
The Colonels started off the 2020–21 season with a 6–1 non-conference record, the highest non-conference winning percentage since 1948–49 (72 years). After 16 games into the season the Colonels had tallied 14 wins and only 2 losses, the best start since 1946–47 (74 years), including a 7–1 start in OVC play, the best start to conference play since 1964–65 (56 years). The team tied an OVC Record and set an EKU record when they drained 20 3-pointers vs UT-Martin on January 21, 2021, scoring 113 points in their 113–73 win, which is the most points vs an OVC opponent since 1988 (33 years). The team tallied 15 Ohio Valley Conference wins (2 more wins than the previous record), when the Colonels beat Belmont on February 25, 2021. Belmont was ranked #27 by the AP Poll and #2 in the Mid-Major Poll, the win also put Belmont's 30 game OVC winning streak to a halt. The 2020–21 Colonels' 22–7 record was the highest winning percentage since the 1964–65 season (56 years ago), 22 wins marks the 3rd most in program history and only the 11th time in program history hitting the 20 win mark. It was the first time since the 1979 season EKU finished with single digit losses. The 76% winning percentage ranked first amongst all Division 1 programs in the State of Kentucky (Morehead 74%, WKU 72%, Louisville 65%, Bellarmine 64%, NKU 56%, Murray State 50% and Kentucky 36%). EKU ranked as high as #12 in the Mid Major top 25. Hamilton was named a finalist for the Hugh Durham Award given to the top Mid-Major Coach in College Basketball.

==== 2021–22 ====
The Colonels broke the school record for season tickets sold in a single season, and the EKU record for most three pointers hit in a road game (18) along with breaking the WKU E.A. Diddle Arena record for 3-pointers hit in a game on December 4, 2022. In that game they would also break the EKU record for 3-pointers attempted in a single game. Later in the month of December they hit 25 3-pointers in a single game. They ended the season third in 3-pointers hit per game (11.71), fourth in 3-pointers made (363) and 3rd in 3-pointers attempted (1,029), all three of these were also EKU Records. On defense, the Colonels were fourth in the nation in steals per game (10.19), eighth in total steals (316), second in turnover margin (+5.84) and seventh in turnovers forced (17.42). EKU was first in the ASUN in all those categories and set the record for most Wins in McBrayer Arena in a Coaches first 4 season at the helm with 41 Wins.

==== 2022–23 ====
Hamilton and staff started the 2022–23 season having the 69th-highest ranked recruiting class in the country. This marks the highest ranked class in school history and contained the highest ranked recruit in program history in Leland Walker 4 star guard out of Indianapolis, Indiana. This class was ranked higher than the likes of Colorado, Rutgers, Cal, UCONN, Georgia, Gonzaga and Utah. Cooper Robb's buzzer beater from 3/4 court to beat Georgia State was #1 on top 10 plays on sports center. Throughout the season Isaiah Cozart tallied 8 blocks against Queens University on New Year's Eve and finished the season with a program record of 94 blocks averaging a record 2.54 per game. The Colonels' won 12 ASUN games making Hamilton the only coach to win 12+ conference games in 3 separate seasons. The Colonels finished the season winning 23 games making Hamilton the 3rd coach to ever have multiple 20 win seasons. The other 2 were Jeff Neubauer (2005–2015) and Rome Rankin (1935–1945). EKU also led the ASUN conference in fan attendance marking another record. After the Colonels successful ASUN season they were invited to Daytona Beach, Florida to participate in the 2023 College Basketball Invitational. They went on to beat Cleveland State, Indiana State and Southern Utah before falling to Charlotte. This marked the first time the Colonels participated in a National Postseason Tournament Championship Game. Devonate Blanton was named ASUN 1st team, ASUN tournament team and also CBI all tournament team. Isaiah Cozart was named to the CBI all tournament team and Tayshawn Comer was named to the ASUN All Freshman team. Hamilton was named into the Scott County hall of fame, was the Bluegrass Collegiate Coach of The Year and was a Finalist for the Skip Prosser Man of the Year award.

The Colonels have broken 49 school records in Hamilton's five and a half seasons at the helm.

==== 2023–24 ====
Heading into the 2023–24 season, EKU basketball underwent a significant transformation when key players announced their return in March 2023. This decision proved pivotal, as it brought back 84% of their scoring, 88% of their assists, 76% of their blocks, 74% of their rebounds, and 74% of their steals from the previous season. EKU was among just 10 teams nationwide to retain 70 percent or more of its points, assists, steals, and blocks from the prior year. The announcement of 12 returning players by Coach A.W. Hamilton and his staff underscored the program's stability and continuity, setting the stage for a promising season. Despite facing early-season challenges and getting knocked down nine times in their first 13 games, the Colonels persevered, showcasing their resilience and unity. Notably, they demonstrated their strength against formidable opponents like Alabama and Purdue, setting the stage for a remarkable turnaround. In January, EKU embarked on an undefeated streak, winning their first seven conference games and tying a program record for the best start to conference since 1959–60. A.W. Hamilton reached a noteworthy coaching milestone when he secured his 97th victory as coach of the Colonels, surpassing Max Good to claim the fourth spot among the winningest coaches in program history.

Shortly thereafter, Hamilton reached a significant milestone by securing his 100th victory at EKU with a memorable win against FGCU on February 7. However, it was a thrilling 3-point victory over North Alabama on February 22 that propelled the team towards a historic achievement. Just two nights later, EKU solidified their legacy by clinching the 2024 Atlantic Sun Conference title with a standout performance against Central Arkansas. Individually, Devontae Blanton was named to the 3rd team All-ASUN, while Leland Walker and Isaiah Cozart earned spots on the 1st team. Walker also made the 2nd Team NABC All-District Team. Isaiah Cozart led the nation in blocks per game and total blocks, and John Ukomadu was the runner-up in the State Farm National Slam Dunk Contest.

Isaiah Cozart made history by recording the first triple-double in school history and set a new record for blocks in a game with 11. Cozart set records for career blocks (210), single-season blocks (116), and career field goal percentage (64.4%). He also became the first player in school and ASUN history to be named both Conference Player of the Year and Defensive Player of the Year in the same season. Michael Moreno was named Vice Chair for the NCAA Men's Basketball Student-Athlete Engagement Group. Leland Walker set a new single-game record for assists with 16, while Michael Moreno became the all-time leader in games played (161) and games started (138). Michael Moreno further solidified his legacy by becoming the all-time leader in three-pointers made (334) and attempted (868). He also became the first player in EKU history to score 1,500 points and grab 900 rebounds. In ASUN rankings, EKU finished #1 in opponent field goal percentage, rebounds, defensive rebounds, offensive rebounds, blocks, and attendance. Nationally, they were ranked #4 in blocks per game, #14 in rebounds per game, #19 in offensive rebounds per game, and #32 in scoring offense.

==== 2024–25 ====
After reconstructing nearly the entire roster from the 2024 ASUN Championship team, A.W. Hamilton led EKU right back into the Atlantic Sun Conference championship race, with the Colonels remaining in contention through the final stretch of the season despite battling injuries and roster turnover throughout the year.

The Colonels entered the 2024–25 season after losing four starters from the previous year's championship squad, including 82% of their rebounds, 77% of their assists, 77% of their minutes played and 75% of their scoring production. The Colonels opened the season with a road victory at East Tennessee State Buccaneers, led Clemson Tigers by four with less than 13 minutes remaining, and pushed the Louisville Cardinals to the brink before falling on a last-second shot.

Once conference play began, EKU put together its longest conference winning streak in 59 years. The Colonels used an eight-game ASUN winning streak to climb to the top of the league standings, including two victories over eventual conference champion Lipscomb Bisons.

Even after injuries impacted the roster late in the season – including a season ending injury to George Kimble III during a road game at Stetson – EKU continued to battle among the top teams in the league until the closing weeks of the season.

During the 2024–25 season, the Colonels ranked 14th nationally in offensive rebounds, 25th in turnovers committed, 25th in turnover margin, 33rd in steals and 37th in 3-pointers made.

Devontae Blanton capped his remarkable career by earning First Team All-ASUN honors and emerging as a candidate for ASUN Player of the Year. He was the only player in the conference ranked among the top 15 in points, rebounds, assists, steals and field goal percentage, finishing his career as the only player in program history with more than 1,600 points, 800 rebounds and 400 assists. Blanton ended his time at EKU ranked second in scoring, fourth in assists and seventh in rebounds, while George Kimble III quickly established himself as one of the ASUN's most dynamic two-way players after transferring from the Division II level. Kimble earned Second Team All-ASUN honors, ranking among the conference leaders in scoring while emerging as one of the nation's elite perimeter defenders, finishing sixth nationally in steals per game. His toughness, versatility and ability to impact the game on both ends of the floor made him a key contributor to the Colonels' success throughout the season. Mayar Wol rounded out EKU's individual honors by earning ASUN Sixth Man of the Year, providing one of the conference's most impactful bench presences through his energy, versatility and production, which played a vital role in the Colonels' success throughout the season.

==== 2025–26 ====
The Colonels broke 23 program records in 2025–26, including Turner Buttry's school mark with a 90.6 free throw percentage. Buttry, a former Kentucky Mr. Basketball, extended what was already a program record 47 consecutive made free throws to an ASUN record 57 straight made at the charity stripe.

Montavious Myrick, the ASUN Preseason Defensive Player of the Year, was chosen third team All-ASUN while Buttry and Jackson Holt earned Academic All-ASUN recognition. Myrick ranked third in the league in rebounding and 13th in blocked shots. Buttry's record setting free throw percentage was the best in the ASUN and 10th in the nation.

EKU ranked seventh in the nation in 3-pointers made per game and ninth in 3-pointers attempted. The Colonels were first in the conference and 40th in the NCAA in offensive rebounds per game.

The Colonels have broken 127 school records in Hamilton's 8 seasons

Eastern Kentucky University secured head coach Hamilton with a contract extension through the 2027–28 season.

== Head coaching record ==
Record table
Season	Team	Overall	Conference	Standing	Postseason
Hargrave Military Academy (First Piedmont) (2011–2017)
2011–12	Hargrave Military Academy	38–1	2–0	1st	National Runner-up
2012–13	Hargrave Military Academy	39–6	2–0	1st	Elite Eight
2013–14	Hargrave Military Academy	32–6	2–0	1st	Elite Eight
2014–15	Hargrave Military Academy	38–6	2–0	1st	Elite Eight
2015–16	Hargrave Military Academy	47–1	2–0	1st	National Champion
2016–17	Hargrave Military Academy	43–2	2–0	1st	Final Four
Total:		237–22 (.915)	12–0 (1.000)		

Record table
Season	Team	Overall	Conference	Standing	Postseason
Eastern Kentucky Colonels (Ohio Valley Conference) (2018–2021)
2018–19	Eastern Kentucky	13–18	6–12	9th	
2019–20	Eastern Kentucky	16–17	12–6	4th	CIT Cancelled
2020–21	Eastern Kentucky	22–7	15–5	3rd	
Eastern Kentucky Colonels (ASUN Conference) (2021–2026)
2021–22	Eastern Kentucky	13–18	5–11	5th (West)	
2022–23	Eastern Kentucky	23–14	12–6	3rd	CBI Runner–up
2023–24	Eastern Kentucky	17–14	12–4	1st	
2024–25	Eastern Kentucky	18–14	12–6	T–4th	
2025–26	Eastern Kentucky	11–21	7–11	T–7th	
2026–27	Eastern Kentucky	5–2	0–0		
Eastern Kentucky:		138–125 (.525)	81–61 (.570)		
Total:		375–147 (.718)	93–61 (.604)		
National champion Postseason invitational champion Conference regular season champion Conference regular season and conference tournament champion Division regular season champion Division regular season and conference tournament champion Conference tournament champion
