= Papa Amadou Kante =

Senegal basketball player

No. 4 – Pittsburgh Panthers
- Position: Power forward
- League: Atlantic Coast Conference

Personal information
- Born: October 27, 2003 (age 23) Dakar, Senegal
- Listed height: 6 ft 10 in (2.08 m)
- Listed weight: 235 lb (107 kg)

Career information
- High school: South Kent School (South Kent, Connecticut)
- College: Pittsburgh (2024–present)

Papa Amadou Kante (born October 27, 2003) is a Senegalese college basketball player for the Pittsburgh Panthers of the Atlantic Coast Conference (ACC).

== High school career ==
Kante moved to the United States in October 2019 where he started to play organized basketball for the first time. In the summer, he began to receive attention playing for Expressions Elite on the EYBL circuit and emerging as breakout prospect at Peach Jam. He was one of the youngest players on the U17 team, but held his own against older opponents.

Kante initially enrolled at a high school in upstate New York. Since he arrived after a certain date, he was not allowed to play varsity basketball, so he had to play junior varsity. After a year, he transferred to South Kent School.

Kante was ranked #91 (247Sports), #95 (Rivals), and #108 (ESPN) in the 2023 recruiting class. At South Kent, he led them to a 29–7 record, the NEPSAC Class AAA regular season title and Class AAA championship. Kante was named NEPSAC Class AAA first team in 2023 and earned honorable mention honors in 2022.

=== Recruiting ===
In November 2022, Kante signed his national letter of intent to play at University of Michigan. He had offers from Siena College, Texas Christian University, East Carolina University, University of Georgia, Rutgers University, Syracuse University and University of Pittsburgh among others.

On April 18, 2023, Kante requested a release from Michigan so he could re-open his recruitment, which he was granted due to an admissions issue.

On May 22, 2023, Kante committed to University of Pittsburgh.

== College career ==
Kante missed his freshman season after he suffered a non-contact knee injury during a workout. On September 23, 2024, the team announced that he was cleared for the 2024–25 season.
