= West Georgia Wolves men's basketball =

West Georgia Wolves
| 2025–26 West Georgia Wolves men's basketball team |
- University: University of West Georgia
- Head coach: Dave Moore (8th season)
- Location: Carrollton, Georgia
- Arena: The Coliseum (capacity: 6,469)
- Conference: UAC
- Nickname: Wolves
- Colors: Blue and red

NCAA Division II tournament Elite Eight
- 2002
Other NCAA Division II tournament results
| Sweet Sixteen | 1983, 1984, 1987, 2002 |
| Appearances | 1975, 1980, 1981, 1983, 1984, 1986, 1987, 1994, 1997, 1998, 1999, 2001, 2002, 2005, 2012, 2015, 2016, 2021, 2023, 2024 |

NAIA tournament champions
- 1974
Other NAIA tournament results
| Appearances | 1972, 1973, 1974 |

Conference tournament champions
- GSC: 2016, 2024

Conference regular-season champions
- GSC: 2024

The West Georgia Wolves men's basketball team, known previously as the West Georgia Braves, represents the University of West Georgia in Carrollton, Georgia. Since the 2024–25 season, the Wolves compete in the Division I United Athletic Conference. Due to the NCAA's policy on reclassifying programs, the Wolves will not be eligible to compete in the NCAA tournament or the NIT until 2028–29.

== NCAA Division II tournament results ==
The Wolves appeared in the NCAA Division II tournament twenty times. Their combined record was 14–21.

| Year | Round | Opponent | Result |
|---|---|---|---|
| 1975 | Regional semifinals Regional third place | New Orleans; Southern | L 89–90; L 98–103 |
| 1980 | Regional semifinals Regional third place | UCF; Bethune–Cookman | L 78–81; W 75–63 |
| 1981 | Regional semifinals Regional third place | Florida Southern; Morehouse | L 74–108; W 102–76 |
| 1983 | Regional semifinals Regional final | West Chester; Jacksonville State | W 74–73; L 76–92 |
| 1984 | Regional semifinals Regional final | Tampa; North Alabama | W 64–63; L 65–66 |
| 1986 | Regional semifinals Regional third place | Florida Southern; Alabama A&M | L 82–83; W 104–84 |
| 1987 | Regional semifinals Regional final | Tampa; Florida Southern | W 81–73; L 69–78 |
| 1994 | Regional first round | Central Missouri State | L 109–112 |
| 1997 | Regional first round | Tampa | L 61–83 |
| 1998 | Regional first round Regional semifinals | Fort Valley State; Lynn | W 77–74; L 92–104 |
| 1999 | Regional first round | Henderson State | L 54–76 |
| 2001 | Regional first round | Henderson State | L 57–68 |
| 2002 | Regional first round Regional semifinals Regional finals Elite Eight | Delta State; Tampa; Valdosta State; Shaw | W 76–71; W 77–69; W 81–69; L 84–102 |
| 2005 | Regional first round | Central Arkansas | L 71–74 |
| 2012 | Regional first round | Eckerd | L 53–60 |
| 2015 | Regional first round Regional semifinals | West Alabama; Florida Southern | W 80–79; L 81–84 |
| 2016 | Regional first round | Stillman | L 79–85 |
| 2021 | Regional first round Regional semifinals | Valdosta State; Flagler | W 79–75; L 53–69 |
| 2023 | Regional first round Regional semifinals | Lee; Nova Southeastern | W 74–61; L 74–105 |
| 2024 | Regional first round Regional semifinals | Lee; Florida Southern | W 75–61; L 87–93 |

== See also ==
- West Georgia Wolves
