= 2027 NCAA Division I men's basketball tournament =

Basketball tournament

- Season: 2026–27
- Teams: 76
- Finals site: Ford Field, Detroit, Michigan

The 2027 NCAA Division I men's basketball tournament will involve a total of 76 teams playing in a single-elimination tournament to help determine the National Collegiate Athletic Association (NCAA) Division I men's college basketball national champion for the 2026–27 season. The 88th edition of the tournament is scheduled to begin on March 16, 2027, and it will conclude with the championship game on April 5, 2027, at Ford Field in Detroit. This tournament will mark the introduction of the Opening Round and an expansion of the field of participants from 68 teams to 76.

== Tournament procedure ==
On May 7, 2026, the NCAA announced that the men's and women's Division I tournaments will expand to 76 teams beginning in 2027. The field will consist of 32 automatic bids awarded to each program that wins a conference championship, and 44 "at-large" bids (an increase from 36) extended by the NCAA selection committee. The selection committee will then seed the teams from 1 to 76. Twenty-four teams (the 12 lowest-seeded automatic qualifiers and the 12 lowest-seeded at-large teams) will compete in the "March Madness Opening Round" (an expanded version of the First Four); the winners of these games will advance to the main 64-team bracket.

== Schedule and venues ==
The following sites were selected to host each round of the 2027 tournament:

2027 Opening Round (orange) and first and second rounds (green)
2027 Regionals (blue) and Final Four (red)

Opening Round

- March 16 and 17
  - University of Dayton Arena, Dayton, Ohio (Host: University of Dayton)
  - Intrust Bank Arena, Wichita, Kansas (Host: Wichita State University)

First and second rounds

- March 18 and 20
  - PPG Paints Arena, Pittsburgh, Pennsylvania (Host: Duquesne University)
  - CHI Health Center Omaha, Omaha, Nebraska (Host: Creighton University)
  - Ariat Arena, Fort Worth, Texas (Host: University of North Texas)
  - Numerica Veterans Arena, Spokane, Washington (Host: University of Idaho)
- March 19 and 21
  - Spectrum Center, Charlotte, North Carolina (Hosts: UNC Charlotte/Atlantic Coast Conference)
  - Target Center, Minneapolis, Minnesota, (Host: University of Minnesota)
  - KFC Yum! Center, Louisville, Kentucky, (Host: University of Louisville)
  - Golden 1 Center, Sacramento, California (Host: California State University, Sacramento)

Regional semifinals and finals (Sweet Sixteen and Elite Eight)

- March 25 and 27
  - South Regional
    - Frost Bank Center, San Antonio, Texas (Host: University of Texas at San Antonio)
  - West Regional
    - Crypto.com Arena, Los Angeles, California (Host: Pepperdine University)
- March 26 and 28
  - Midwest Regional
    - T-Mobile Center, Kansas City, Missouri (Host: Big 12 Conference)
  - East Regional
    - Madison Square Garden, New York, New York (Hosts: Big East Conference/St. John's University)

National semifinals and championship game (Final Four)

- April 3 and 5
  - Ford Field, Detroit, Michigan (Host: Michigan State University)

Detroit will host the Final Four for the second time, having previously hosted in 2009.

== Media coverage ==
=== Television ===
CBS Sports will have US television rights to the tournament carried by various Skydance Corporation channels, with CBS holding the Final Four and Championship Game. This will be the first tournament under the consolidation of Paramount and Warner Bros. Discovery that closed in October 2026. Skydance will announce which channels will join with CBS for additional coverage.

==== Television channels ====
- Selection Show – CBS
- Opening round – Skydance channels TBD
- First and second rounds – CBS and selected Skydance channels TBD
- Regional semifinals and finals – CBS and selected Skydance channels TBD
- National semifinals (Final Four) and championship – CBS

==== Streaming ====
- Paramount+ / HBO Max (consolidated after Paramount-Warner Bros. Discovery merger)

=== Radio ===
Westwood One will have exclusive coverage of the tournament.

== See also ==
- 2027 NCAA Division I women's basketball tournament
