= Trevecca Nazarene Trojans =

Trevecca Trojans
- University: Trevecca Nazarene University
- Nickname: Trojans
- NCAA: Division II
- Conference: Gulf South Conference
- Athletic director: Mark Elliott
- Location: Nashville, Tennessee
- First year: 1969; 57 years ago
- Varsity teams: 17 (7 men's, 9 women's)
- Colors: Purple and White
- Mascot: Troy Trevecca
- Fight song: Washington & Lee
- Website: tnutrojans.com

The Trevecca Trojans are the athletic teams that represent Trevecca Nazarene University, located in Nashville, Tennessee, in intercollegiate sports at the NCAA Division II ranks. The Trojans moved from the NAIA to NCAA Division II in 2012–2013 and were a founding member of the Great Midwest Athletic Conference (G-MAC). In 2024-25, the Trojans moved their athletic teams to the Gulf South Conference.

== Conference affiliations ==
NAIA

- Tennessee Collegiate Athletic Conference (1985–1996)
- TranSouth Athletic Conference (1996–2012)

NCAA

- Great Midwest Athletic Conference (2012–2024)
- Gulf South Conference (2024–future)

== Overview ==
The first intercollegiate team fielded by Trevecca was men's basketball, led by Elmer Heaberlin in 1969 during Dr. Mark R. Moore's tenure as university president. Men's baseball was added next, led by Bill Green. The first championship came with the 1972–73 men's basketball team. Bill Boner replaced Elmer Heaberlin as men's coach and later went on to be a US Congressman and Mayor of Nashville.

The first All-American for Trevecca was Kenny Thomas, who later coached at Volunteer State Community College and later at USC Aiken.

The athletic director at Trevecca is Mark Elliott, a former Vanderbilt University baseball and basketball player. He later played in the New York Mets organization in the same outfield as Darryl Strawberry and Billy Beane.

The voice of the Trojans and sports information director is Gregory Ruff. Ruff has worked in local media before and during his time at Trevecca, broadcasting for Vanderbilt University and Belmont University, as well as the Nashville Stars. Ruff, a Trevecca graduate, started with the university in 1998. Ruff was inducted into the Trevecca Athletic Hall of Fame in November of 2025.

== Varsity sports ==
Trevecca competes in seventeen intercollegiate varsity sports. Men's sports include baseball, basketball, cross country, golf, soccer, and track and field (indoor/outdoor). Women's sports include basketball, cross country, golf, soccer, softball, STUNT, track and field (indoor/outdoor), and volleyball. The Trojans sponsor cheerleading.

=== Men's basketball ===
Trevecca's basketball team first made a trip to the NAIA National Tournament in 1987. The team defeated defending national champion Lipscomb in the District 24 Tournament, then reached the Elite Eight in Kansas City at Kemper Arena. The team was led by head coach Frank Wilson. Trevecca point guard Avery Patton was an All-American and a member of the NAIA National Tournament team.

David Suddeth is the all-time leading scorer in Trevecca basketball history, he scored 3,004 career points on the way to earning All-American honors. Suddeth is one of a few college basketball athletes (less than 40 at all NCAA or NAIA Divisions) to score more than 3,000 career points. Suddeth is the first Trevecca athlete to be inducted into the Tennessee Sports Hall of Fame.

In 2023, Kevin Carroll took over the Trojan program and in one season took a two-win program and won 16 games, reaching the 2024 Great Midwest Athletic Conference tournament. In March 2025, Nathan Moran was promoted to head coach of the Men's basketball team.

=== Women's basketball ===
Trevecca's first four-time All-American athlete is women's basketball star Jennifer Wilson, the daughter of former men's basketball coach Frank Wilson. Both Frank and Jennifer are in the Trevecca Hall of Fame, they were inducted together.

Julie Van Beek led the restarted program to the NAIA National Championships in just three seasons and recruited a number of All-American's and Hall of Famers. Coach Van was also inducted to the Trevecca Athletic Hall of Fame.

Gary Van Atta, who played at Trevecca, led the program that Van Beek built to the 2008 NAIA National Championship Game. He ended up becoming the most-winning coach in school history, helping the Trojans transition to NCAA Division II.

Karen Booker, a Vanderbilt All-American and Hall of Fame inductee, led the Trojans to the NCAA Regions in 2023 and in 2024. The former WNBA player took over the program and led it to 22 wins, with primarily a roster that had won just five games the year before. In spring 2025 Booker announced she would not return for the 2025-26 season. Doug Novak was hired to replace her.

=== Men's baseball ===
Trevecca's baseball program reached the NCAA Division II College World Series in Cary, NC in 2021. Coach Chase Sain led the team to the College World Series in his first year as the head coach. Sain won his 163rd game on Feb. 7, 2026, moving him into fourth place on the all-time win list.

The Trojans have had several players drafted in the MLB Amateur Draft. Most recently, Hunter Newman (junior, Chapmansboro, Tennessee), an all-American third baseman, was drafted by the St. Louis Cardinals in the 22nd round with the 671st pick. Newman was named an American Baseball Coaches Association (ABCA)/Rawlings All-American. Newman was also a third-team member of the 2015 Daktronics All-American team, making him the first Trevecca or G-MAC player to make the team. Two organizations, the ABCA/Rawlings and Daktronics, named Newman their 2015 Midwest Player of the Year. He is the 2015 G-MAC Player of the Year, a G-MAC first team all-conference selection, a ABCA/Rawlings ⁯Midwest Region first team honoree, a Daktronics Midwest Region first teamer, and honored as an NCBWA Midwest Region first team member.

The previous two Trojans drafted in the Major League Baseball (MLB) Amateur Draft were PJ Francescon and Craig Stem, who were both drafted in the 2011 draft. Francescon, from Nolensville, Tennessee, was drafted by the Chicago Cubs in the 40th round. Stem, who was taken by the Los Angeles Dodgers in the 15th round, was the 464th overall pick, just one pick behind former Trojan Brad Coon, who was the 463rd pick in 2005. 2011 was the first time Trevecca has ever had two players drafted in the same year.

Coon, who reached Triple-A Salt Lake for more than a season, was drafted by the Los Angeles Angels of Anaheim in the 15th round of the 2005 MLB Amateur Draft. Coon now serves and an assistant for former Trevecca coach Jeff Forehand at Lipscomb. Coon was elected to the Trevecca Athletic Hall of Fame in 2014.

Former Trevecca pitcher and Coon's teammate, B.J. Jenkins was taken by the San Diego Padres in the 28th round in the 2004 MLB Draft. Former Trevecca pitcher Tim Dunn was drafted by the Cincinnati Reds in the 46th round of the 2009 draft. Dunn returned for his senior season at Trevecca, but an arm injury prevented him from being drafted again in 2010.

Trevecca outfielder Mario Campos was a 29th-round selection by the Boston Red Sox in the 2001 draft. Another Trojan outfielder, Seth Richmond, was taken in the 1983 draft when the Houston Astros picked him in the 24th round. Mike Mills, who pitched his senior year at Birmingham–Southern but played for Trevecca his first three seasons, was drafted by the San Diego Padres in the seventh round of the 1983 MLB Amateur Draft. Mills, while with Trevecca, was drafted by the Cincinnati Reds in the 32nd round of the 1982 MLB Draft.

Trevecca has had several players signed by Major League teams. Rob Erwin, Keith Black, Eric Van Slyke, Luke Brown, Maurice Cole, and Jeremy Todd were signed and played professionally.

Stipe Miocic played baseball for Trevecca. The two-time UFC World Heavyweight Champion was on the 2005 TranSouth Athletic Conference (TranSouth) championship team coached by Jeff Forehand. Forehand played at Belmont University and later moved to coach at Lipscomb University.

The Trevecca baseball program won its 1,500th game on February 13, 2026 during a doubleheader sweep of Auburn Montgomery at Jackson Field.

== Hall of Fame ==
=== Class of 2007 ===
In 2007, Trevecca welcomed Bill Green, Kenny Thomas and Michael Blivens into the hall of fame.

Bill Green was the first ever coach for the baseball program in 1970. Over 9 years of coaching he coaches one NAIA All-American, one NAIA All-Region player, 5 all-district platers and 4 all-conference players. He was named VSAC coach of the year in 1978 and 1979. He was also named NAIA District 24 Coach of the Year in 1976 and 1979. He was also named the Volunteer State Athletic Conference Western Division Coach of the year in 1976, 1977, 1978 and 1979. He won a total of 3 conference titles in 1976, 1978, and 1979. He also made NAIA District 24 Tournament in 1976, 1978, and 1979.

Kenny Thomas played for the baseball program in 1976, 1977, and 1978.Throughout his college career he had a .335 batting average, scored 124 runs, hit 28 home runs, had 130 RBI, and 157 hits. He also had a 100% completion rate when stealing bases going 12 for 12. He is the only Trevecca Athlete to have his number retired. Coach Bill Green retired number 19 shortly after graduation. He went on to be a scout for the New York Yankees, Cincinnati Reds, and St. Louis Cardinals. After his wife died, the only thing that could help him was baseball, so coaching in MLB Draft League helped him get back to being himself.

Michael Blivens played for the Trojans basketball team in 1999-2001. He set the school record for three-point filed goal attempts, has the higher free throw percentage in a career, steals in a game. He is also tied for free throws made and attempted during an individual game. By the end of his career he had a total of 1377 points, 157 steals, 135 assists and 326 rebounds. He was named to the TranSouth Athletic Conference fitst team, the All-TranSouth East Division Team, and was an All-American Third Team. Before Trevecca he played for Mississippi Valley State University and Aquinas College.
