= Winston Bennett =

American basketball player and coach (born 1965)

Personal information
- Born: February 9, 1965 (age 61) Louisville, Kentucky, U.S.
- Listed height: 6 ft 7 in (2.01 m)
- Listed weight: 210 lb (95 kg)

Career information
- High school: Louisville Male (Louisville, Kentucky)
- College: Kentucky (1983–1988)
- NBA draft: 1988: 3rd round, 64th overall pick
- Drafted by: Cleveland Cavaliers
- Playing career: 1988–1992
- Position: Small forward
- Number: 20, 30
- Coaching career: 1995–2013

Career history

Playing
- 1988: Teorema Arese
- 1988–1989: Pensacola Tornados
- 1989–1992: Cleveland Cavaliers
- 1992: Miami Heat

Coaching
- 1995–1997: Kentucky (assistant)
- 1997–1998: Boston Celtics (assistant)
- 2000–2003: Kentucky State
- 2007–2013: Mid-Continent

Career highlights
- As player: 2× Second-team All-SEC (1986, 1988); McDonald's All-American Co-MVP (1983); First-team Parade All-American (1983); Third-team Parade All-American (1982); Kentucky Mr. Basketball (1983); As coach: SIAC champion (2001)
- Stats at NBA.com
- Stats at Basketball Reference

Winston George Bennett III (born February 9, 1965) is an American former professional basketball player and coach.

== High school and college career ==
A star at Louisville Male High School, Bennett was named "Mr. Basketball" for the State of Kentucky in 1983. He also earned Parade Magazine All-American and McDonald's All-American honors, sharing MVP honors with Dwayne Washington.

Bennett played collegiately at the University of Kentucky where he wore #25 and was known as "Steady Bee". As a freshman in 1983–84, Bennett appeared in 34 games for UK, averaging 6.5 points in 19 minutes per game as the Wildcats reached the Final Four, losing to Georgetown, 53–40.

The following season, he averaged 7.2 points in nearly 20 minutes per game to help UK to the West Regional Semi-Finals. In 1985–86, his junior season, Bennett was named to the All-NCAA Regional Team and the SEC All-Conference Team after averaging 12.7 points and 7 rebounds per game. Playing under first-year coach Eddie Sutton, Bennett shot better than 50 percent from the field helped lead the Wildcats to a 32–4 record.

After red-shirting in 1986–87 to rehab a serious knee injury, Bennett served as team captain and averaged 15.2 points and 7.8 rebounds per game as a senior during the following season, again earning All-SEC honors. Along with teammate and future NBA player Rex Chapman, Bennett helped lead the Wildcats that season to their 37th SEC title with a 27–6 record. The Wildcats were ranked as the 6th college basketball team in the nation by the Associated Press and UPI and secured the number two Southeast Conference seed in the 1988 NCAA Men's Division I Basketball Tournament. Kentucky's talents led the team to the tournament's Sweet Sixteen, where they suffered a defeat against Villanova.

== Professional career ==
The 6-foot, 7-inch Bennett was selected by the Cleveland Cavaliers in the third round (64th overall) of the 1988 NBA draft and went on to play three seasons in the NBA, mainly for the Cavaliers, from 1989 to 1992. Prior to his stint in the NBA, Bennett spent 1988 playing with the Italian club Teorema Arese before joining the Pensacola Tornados of the Continental Basketball Association during the 1988–89 season. His best year as a pro came during his rookie season with the Cavaliers when he appeared in 55 games and averaged 6.1 points per game.

== Coaching career ==
After his professional playing career ended, Bennett served as an assistant coach under Rick Pitino at the University of Kentucky from 1995 to 1997 and, later, under Pitino, with the Boston Celtics, during the 1997–98 NBA season.

In 1996, while an assistant at Kentucky, the Wildcats won the NCAA Championship, defeating Syracuse, 76–67. The following season, UK finished as the runner-up, losing to Arizona in the championship game, 84–79.

In May 2000, he was named head men's basketball coach at Kentucky State University, a Division II university in Frankfort, Kentucky. In his first season with the Thorobreds, he led the team to a conference championship.

But on November 6, 2003, less than a week before the 2003–04 season was scheduled to begin, Kentucky State fired Bennett for allegedly hitting a player. According to an Associated Press report, "senior guard Ricky Green filed a complaint with the Franklin County attorney's office, accusing Bennett of striking him in the face during practice." According to the AP story, Bennett expressed regret about the incident, saying "If there was ever a time when I wish the hands of time could be turned back, it is right now." Bennett was 44–43 in three seasons at Kentucky State.

In May 2007, Bennett was named the head men's basketball coach at Mid-Continent University, an NAIA school in Mayfield, Kentucky. In 2007–08, the Cougars went 11–21, finishing ninth in the TranSouth Athletic Conference.

On June 17, 2013, Bennett resigned his position as head coach at Mid-Continent. His record at six seasons at MCU was 91–103.

In 2014 Mid-Continent University laid off all its employees and made plans to close following the end of the school year.

== Personal life ==
Bennett and his wife Peggy reside in Louisville. After his coaching career, he joined Louisville-based insurance agency Van Zandt, Emrich & Cary Inc.
