= List of NAIA regions =

From the mid-1990's until the 2007–08 school year, the National Association of Intercollegiate Athletics (NAIA) consisted of athletic regions to group certain college athletic conferences and certain independent schools that fit within the geographic footprints. With the formation of the Association of Independent Institutions (A.I.I.; now the Continental Athletic Conference) in fall 2008, the regions would be eventually dissolved.

== List of regions ==
=== Region I ===
Conferences and independent schools within the Pacific Northwest (and Western Canada):

- Cascade Collegiate Conference (CCC)
- Frontier Conference (Frontier)
- Independents:
  - University of Alberta
  - University of British Columbia
  - University of Victoria

=== Region II ===
Conferences and independent schools within California, Arizona and Nevada:

- California Pacific Conference (CalPac)
- Great Southwest Athletic Conference (GSAC)
- Independents: n/a

=== Region III ===
Conferences and independent schools within the Upper Midwest (and Prairies Canada):

- Great Plains Athletic Conference (GPAC)
- North Star Athletic Association (NSAA)
- Independents:
  - University of Regina

=== Region IV ===
Conferences and independent schools within the North Central U.S.:

- Kansas Collegiate Athletic Conference (KCAC)
- Midlands Collegiate Athletic Conference (MCAC or Midlands; defunct)

=== Region V ===
Conferences and independent schools within the North Central and South Central U.S.:

- American Midwest Conference
- Heart of America Athletic Conference (HAAC)
- Independents: n/a

=== Region VI ===
Conferences and independent schools within the South Central U.S.:

- Red River Athletic Conference (RRAC)
- Sooner Athletic Conference (SAC)
  - Independents: n/a

=== Region VII ===
Conferences and independent schools within the Great Lakes:

- Chicagoland Collegiate Athletic Conference (CCAC)
- Midwest Collegiate Conference (MCC)

=== Region VIII ===
Conferences and independent schools within the Great Lakes (and Ontario):

- Crossroads League
- Wolverine-Hoosier Athletic Conference
- Independents:
  - University of Windsor

=== Region IX ===
Conferences and independent schools within the Mid-Atlantic U.S.:

- American Mideast Conference
- Independent: n/a

=== Region X ===
Conferences and independent schools within New England and the Northeast U.S.:

- Sunrise Athletic Conference
- Independent:
  - State University of New York at Delhi

=== Region XI ===
Conferences and independent schools within the Mid-South U.S.:

- TranSouth Athletic Conference (TSAC)
- Mid-South Conference

=== Region XII ===
Conferences and independent schools within the South Atlantic U.S.:

- Appalachian Athletic Conference (AAC)
- River States Conference (RSC)
- Independents:
  - Morris College
  - Voorhees College

=== Region XIII ===
Conferences and independent schools within the Southeast U.S.:

- Gulf Coast Athletic Conference (GCAC)
- Southern States Athletic Conference (SSAC)

=== Region XIV ===
Conferences and independent schools within Florida:

- The Sun Conference
