= Lipscomb Bisons baseball =

Lipscomb Bisons
- 2026 Lipscomb Bisons baseball team
- Founded: 1869
- Conference history: Mississippi Valley Conference (1929–1934); Volunteer State Athletic Conference (1948–1985); Tennessee Collegiate Athletic Conference (1986–1996); TranSouth Athletic Conference (1997–2001)
- University: Lipscomb University
- Head coach: Jeff Forehand (20th season)
- Conference: Atlantic Sun; Gold Division
- Location: Nashville, Tennessee
- Home stadium: Dugan Field (capacity: 1,500)
- Nickname: Bisons
- Colors: Purple and gold

College World Series champions
- NAIA: 1977, 1979

NCAA tournament appearances
- 2008, 2015, 2023, 2026

Conference tournament champions
- 2008, 2015, 2023, 2026

Conference regular season champions
- 2022, 2023

The Lipscomb Bisons baseball team is the varsity intercollegiate baseball team of Lipscomb University in Nashville, Tennessee, United States. The team competes in the National Collegiate Athletic Association's Division I and is a member of the ASUN Conference.

The Bisons have been to three NCAA tournaments, in 2008, 2015, and 2023.

== Lipscomb in the NCAA Tournament ==
Year	Record	Pct	Notes
2008	1–2	.333	Athens Regional
2015	0–2	.000	Nashville Regional
2023	0–2	.000	Clemson Regional
2026	0–2	.000	Starkville Regional
TOTALS	1–8	.111	

== Stadiums ==
=== Ken Dugan Field at Stephen Lee Marsh Stadium ===
The Bisons have played their home games at Dugan Field in Nashville since 1991. The facility has a capacity of 1,500 spectators. The playing surface is named after Ken Dugan, Lipscomb baseball coach from 1960 to 1996 and winner of over 1,000 games as head of the program. The surrounding stadium is named after Stephen Lee Marsh.

== Head coaches ==
Head coaches
Year(s)	Coach	Seasons	W–L–T	Pct
1926–1928	Hershel Priestley	3	0–0–0	–
1929	Edgar Darnell	1	0–0–0	–
1930–1932	H. Leo Boles	3	0–0–0	–
1933	Robert Alexander	1	0–0–0	–
1934–1936, 1938–1942	Robert Neil	8	0–0–0	–
1937	Pinkey Berryhill	1	0–0–0	–
1947–1951	Herman Waddell	5	0–0–0	–
1952	Axel Swang	1	0–0–0	–
1953–1956	Elvis Sherrill	4	0–0–0	–
1957–1959	Charles Morris	3	0–0–0	–
1960–1996	Ken Dugan	37	1,137–450	.716
1997–2000	Mel Brown	4	0–0–0	–
2001–2006	Wynn Fletcher	6	123–184	.401
2007–present	Jeff Forehand	18	479–501	.489
Totals	14	95	1,739–1,135	.605

== NCAA tournament ==
NCAA tournament
Year	Site	Record	Notes
2008	Foley Field	1–2	Athens Regional
2015	Hawkins Field	0–2	Nashville Regional
2023	Doug Kingsmore Stadium	0–2	Clemson Regional
2026	Dudy Noble Field	0–1	Starkville Regional
Total	—	1–7	(1–7 regionals)

== Player awards ==
=== Atlantic Sun award winners ===
- Defensive Player of the Year Award

Caleb Ketchup (2022)
Michael Gigliotti (2017)
Grant Massey (2015)

- Pitcher of the Year

Brady Puckett (2016)

- Freshman of the Year Award

Rex Brothers (2007)
