= Earl Irvin West =

American Restoration movement historian

Earl West
- Born: Earl Irvin West; May 18, 1920; Carmel, Indiana, U.S.
- Died: February 4, 2011 (aged 90); Memphis, Tennessee, U.S.
- Education: Butler University; Indiana University Bloomington (Ph.D American History)
- Occupation: Professor of church history
- Years active: 1949–2004
- Organization: Harding School of Theology
- Known for: American Restoration Movement history
- Notable work: Search for the Ancient Order

Earl Irvin West (May 18, 1920, Carmel, Indiana – February 4, 2011, Memphis, Tennessee) was a historian of the Restoration Movement. He was known for his multivolume work Search for the Ancient Order, published incrementally from 1949 to 1993.

Although he lived in Indianapolis, Indiana, and was the minister for two different congregations; he also served for many years as professor of church history at Harding Graduate School of Religion in Memphis, Tennessee, now Harding School of Theology, commuting once a week to Memphis. West founded Religious Book Service.

== Early life and education ==
West was baptized by Hugo McCord in 1935. He attended Freed–Hardeman University in Tennessee, Abilene Christian University in Texas and Pepperdine University in California. He received a master's degree in divinity and theology from Butler University and a doctorate in American history at Indiana University Bloomington.
