= Southwestern Bible College =

Southwestern Bible College may refer to:

- Southwestern Assemblies of God University, 1927 Waxahachie, Texas
- Southwestern Christian University, 1946 Bethany, Oklahoma
