= Victory College =

Victory College may refer to:

- Victory College, Australia a K to 12 school in Queensland, Australia.
- Victoria College, Alexandria a college in Egypt.
- Victory University, a college in Memphis, Tennessee, United States.
