= Kevin Carroll =

Kevin Carroll may refer to:

- Kevin Carroll (actor) (born 1969), American actor
- Kevin Carroll (politician), British politician, chairman of the now defunct British Freedom Party
- Kevin Carroll (prosthetist), Irish prosthetist, researcher, educator, and author
- Kevin Carroll (gridiron football) (born 1969), American football defensive lineman
- Kevin Carroll (basketball), American basketball coach
