= Hubert T. McGee =

American architect

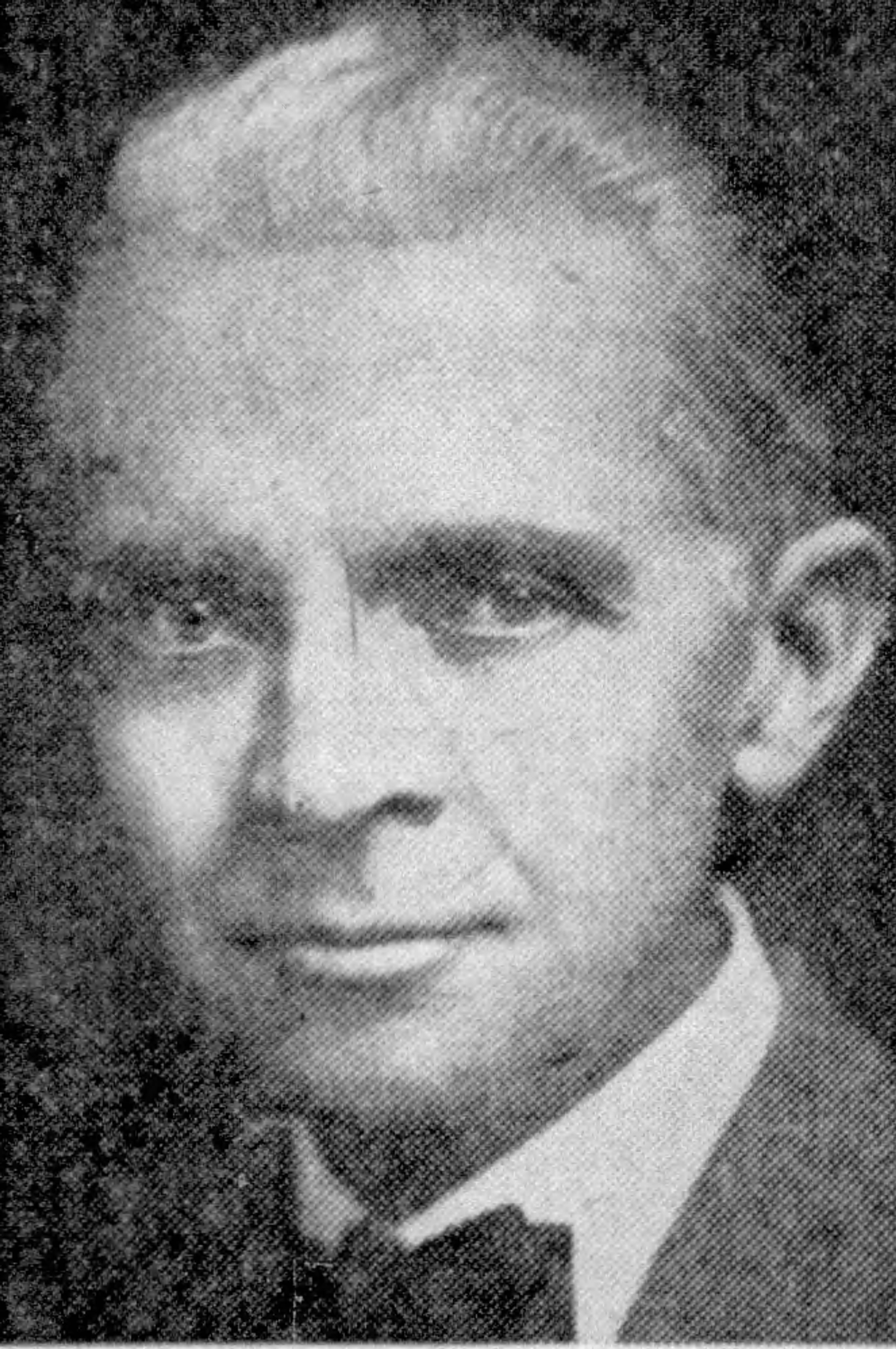
Hubert T. McGee

Hubert Thomas McGee (June 7, 1864 – May 26, 1946), commonly known as Hubert T. McGee, was an American architect based in Memphis, Tennessee. A number of his works are listed on the National Register of Historic Places. He had no formal architectural education but studied with architect Reuben A. Heavner of Jackson, Tennessee.

He is most noted for having designed the Clarence Saunders House in Memphis in what he termed " "Romanesque American Rambling Design." Built with pink and gray Georgia marble, it became known as the "Pink Palace" and is currently the Memphis Pink Palace Museum. Clarence Saunders, who founded the Piggly Wiggly grocery store chain, lost ownership before it was complete.

He was born June 7, 1864, in Jacks Creek, Chester County, Tennessee. He died aged 81 on May 26, 1946, in Memphis.

Works include:

- Memphis Pink Palace Museum, 3050 Central Ave. Memphis, TN, NRHP-listed
- Greenstone Apartments, 1116-1118 Poplar Ave. and 200 Waldran Blvd. Memphis, TN, NRHP-listed
- National Teacher's Normal and Business College Administration Building, 158 E. Main St. Henderson, TN, NRHP-listed
- One or more works in Savannah Historic District, 410 and 506 Main St. Savannah, TN, NRHP-listed
- Woodland Country Club, a 7,000 square feet (650 m^{2}) log cabin for a Clarence Saunders golf course.
- Union Avenue Methodist Episcopal church, Memphis
- St. Paul Methodist Episcopal church, Memphis
- St. John's church annex, Memphis
- First Methodist Episcopal church annex, Memphis

He was a member of the American Institute of Architects.
