= Central Baptist College =

College in Conway, Arkansas, U.S.

- Former names: Central College for Christian Workers (May–Aug. 1952); Conway Baptist College (Aug. 1952–1961)
- Type: Private college
- Established: 1952; 74 years ago
- Religious affiliation: Baptist Missionary Association of Arkansas
- President: Jeremy Langley
- Students: 547
- Location: Conway, Arkansas; 35°05′00″N 92°26′42″W
- Colors: Blue & Gray
- Nickname: Mustangs & Lady Mustangs
- Sporting affiliations: NAIA – American Midwest
- Mascot: Mustang
- Website: cbc.edu

Central Baptist College (CBC) is a private Baptist college in Conway, Arkansas. CBC was founded in 1952 as Conway Baptist College, using the former campus of Central College, defunct since 1947. It awards both associate and bachelor's degrees. Enrollment is at 470 for traditional students with a 55% to 45% male to female ratio and over 200 non-traditional PACE Students. The college employs approximately 75 full-time employees across all of its locations. Students are required to live on campus their freshman year (with exceptions). Chapel services are required once weekly for all full-time students.

== Accreditation ==
Central Baptist College is accredited by the Higher Learning Commission.

== Athletics ==
The Central Baptist athletic teams are called the Mustangs and Lady Mustangs. The college is a member of the National Association of Intercollegiate Athletics (NAIA), primarily competing in the American Midwest Conference (AMC) since the 2015–16 academic year. They were also a member of the National Christian College Athletic Association (NCCAA), primarily competing as an independent in the Central Region of the Division I level until after the 2017–18 academic year to fully align with the NAIA. The Mustangs and Lady Mustangs previously competed in the defunct Midlands Collegiate Athletic Conference (MCAC) from 2011–12 to 2014–15 (when the conference dissolved); as well as an NAIA Independent within the Association of Independent Institutions (AII) from 2009–10 to 2010–11.

Central Baptist competes in 16 intercollegiate varsity sports: Men's sports include baseball, basketball, cross country, golf, soccer, track & field (indoor and outdoor) and wrestling; while women's sports include basketball, cross country, golf, soccer, softball, track & field (indoor and outdoor) and volleyball.

Central Baptist College is also a member of the Fellowship of Christian Athletes.
