= National Teachers' Normal and Business College Administration Building =

- U.S. National Register of Historic Places
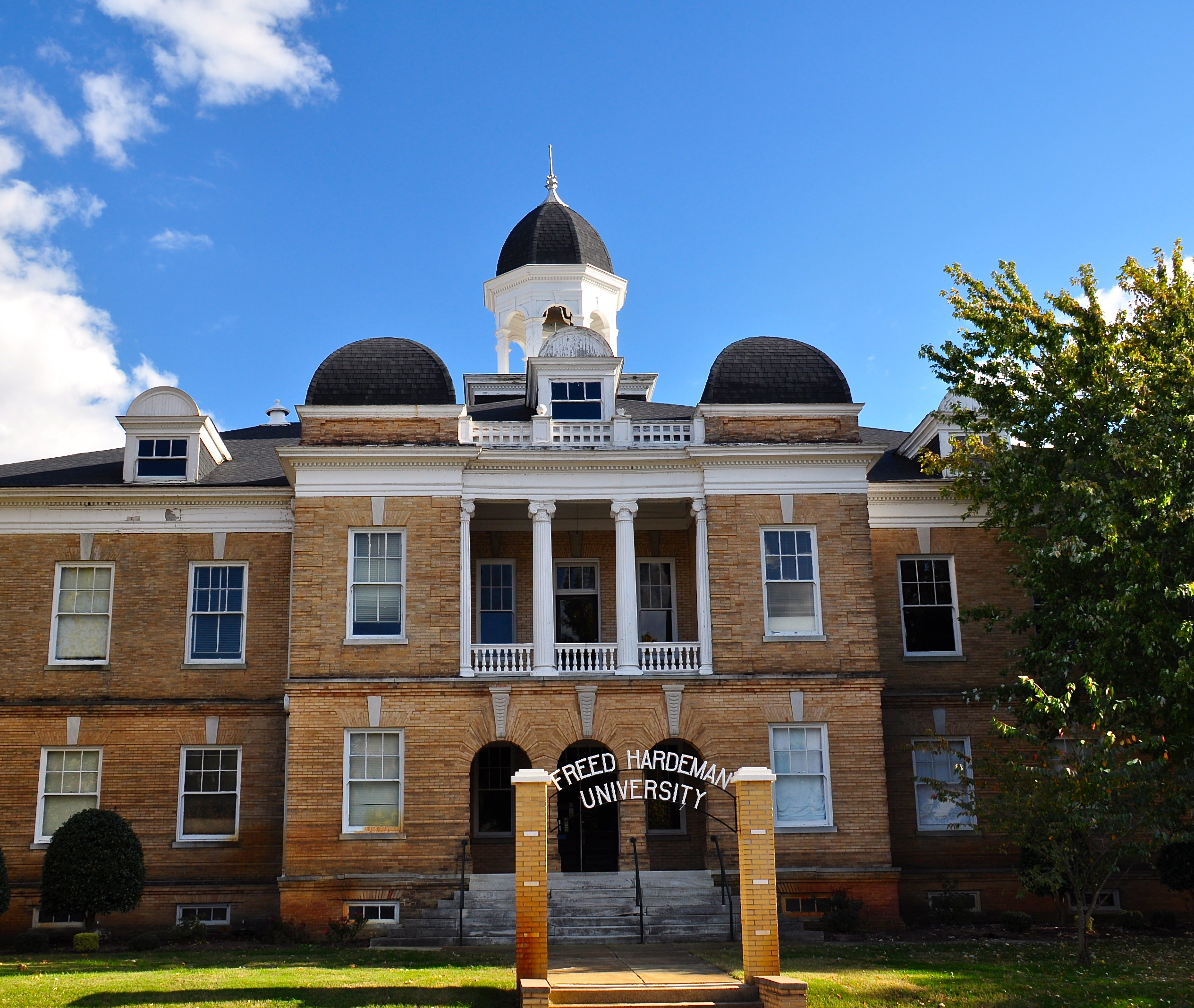

- Location within Tennessee
- Location: 158 E. Main St., Henderson, Tennessee
- Coordinates: 35°26′25″N 88°38′22″W
- Area: 1 acre (0.40 ha)
- Built: 1907-08
- Architect: Hubert T. McGee
- Architectural style: Renaissance, Italianate
- NRHP reference No.: 12000116
- Added to NRHP: March 12, 2012

The National Teachers' Normal and Business College Administration Building, at 158 E. Main St. in Henderson, Tennessee, was built in 1908. It was listed on the National Register of Historic Places in 2012.

It was designed by Memphis architect Hubert T. McGee in Renaissance and/or Italianate style.

It was a main building of the National Teachers' Normal and Business College, which was incorporated in 1907 as a successor of the West Tennessee Christian College, itself the successor of the Henderson Male and Female Institute. A. G. Freed served as president and N. B. Hardeman served as vice-president; the college was renamed for them in 1919 and eventually became the Freed-Hardeman University in 1990. The entire structure (aka, Old Main) underwent a thorough renovation which was completed in 2019.
