= University of Tennessee Southern =

Public university in Pulaski, Tennessee, US

- Former names: Martin Female College (1870–1908); Martin College (1908–1986); Martin Methodist College (1986–2021)
- Motto: Cognito, Opportunitas, Veritas
- Motto in English: Knowledge, Opportunity, Truth
- Type: Public university
- Established: 1870
- Parent institution: University of Tennessee System
- Endowment: $9.28 million
- Chancellor: Melinda S. Arnold
- Faculty: 57
- Students: 1,132 (fall 2025)
- Location: Pulaski, Tennessee, U.S. 35.2002°N 87.0364°W
- Campus: Rural, 55 acres (22 ha)
- Colors: Gray & Orange
- Nickname: Firehawks
- Sporting affiliations: NAIA – SSAC
- Mascot: Flame the Firehawk
- Website: utsouthern.edu
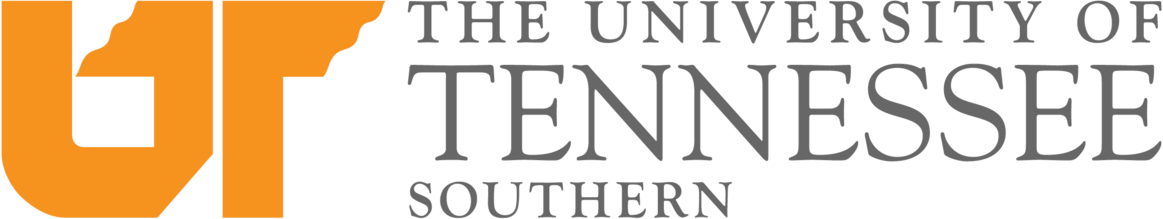

The University of Tennessee Southern (UT Southern or UTS) is a public university in Pulaski, Tennessee, United States. Founded in 1870, it was a private institution for over 150 years until joining the University of Tennessee System in 2021. It was renamed and became the first new primary campus in the University of Tennessee System in over 50 years. The name University of Tennessee Southern was chosen because the campus serves the 13 counties of southern Middle Tennessee.

== History ==
UT Southern was originally founded as Martin Methodist College in 1870. The college was named for Thomas Martin, former mayor of Pulaski, who left in his will an endowment of $30,000 to establish a college for the education of the white girls and women of Giles County. It is sometimes suggested that Martin did so in fulfilment of a promise to his daughter Victoria, who died at the age of twenty. In 1938, the college became coeducational. Originally founded as a whites-only institution, in 1966 it became racially integrated. The college was originally named Martin Female College until 1908, when its name was changed to Martin College. Then, in April 1986, it became Martin Methodist College after becoming a private institution affiliated with the United Methodist Church. In July 2021, the campus was purchased by the University of Tennessee System and was converted to a public four-year institution.

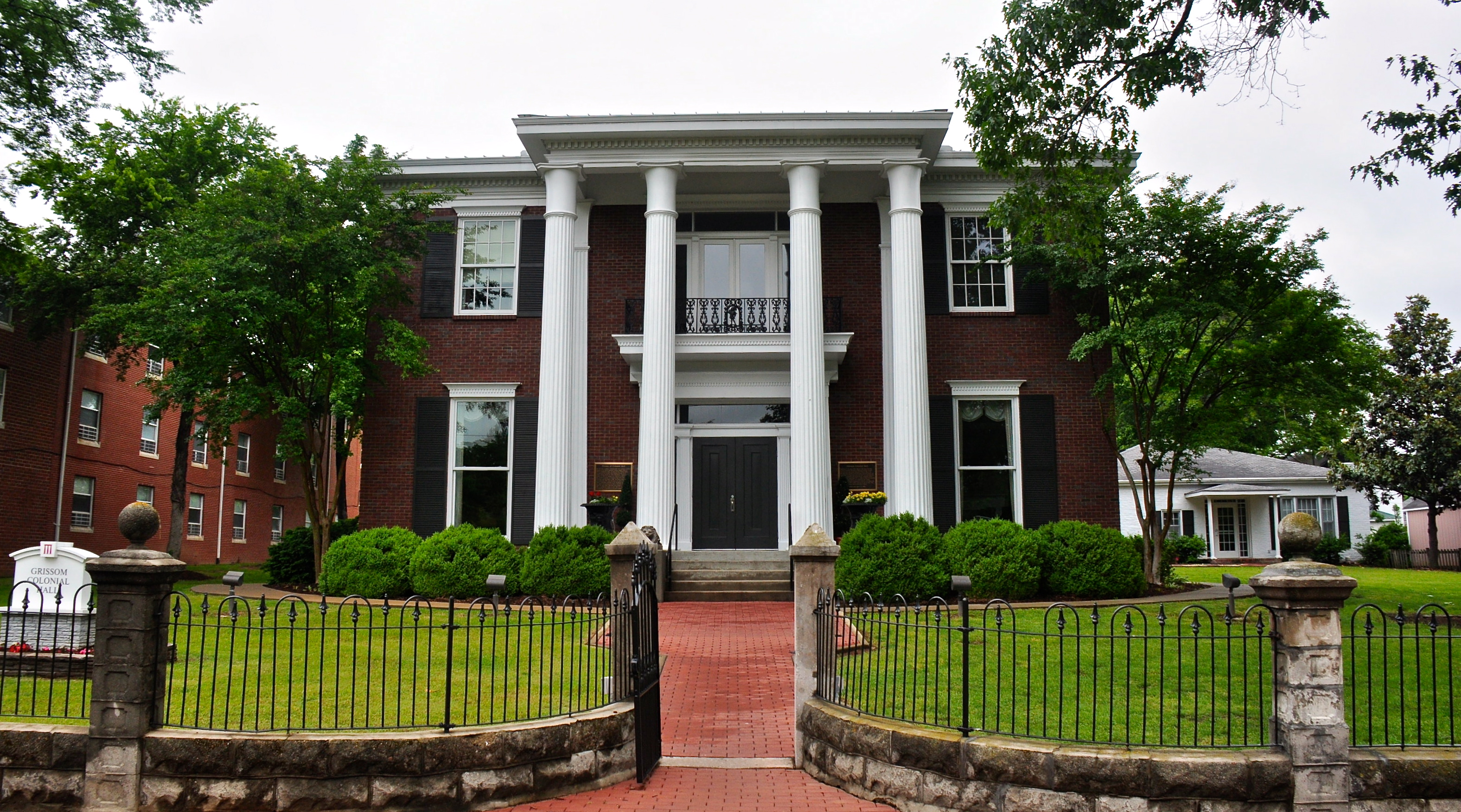
Grissom Colonial Hall, May 2014

== Athletics ==
Undergraduate demographics as of Fall 2023
Race and ethnicity	Total
White	77%
International student	8%
Black	5%
Hispanic	4%
Unknown	3%
Two or more races	2%
Asian	1%
Economic diversity
Low-income (Note: The percentage of students who received an income-based federal Pell grant intended for low-income students.)	41%
Affluent (Note: The percentage of students who are a part of the American middle class at the bare minimum.)	59%

The UT Southern athletic teams are called the Firehawks (previously they were known as the RedHawks before the UT system merger). The university is a member of the National Association of Intercollegiate Athletics (NAIA), primarily competing in the Southern States Athletic Conference (SSAC) on its second stint since the 2023–24 academic year. The Firehawks had previously competed as members of the SSAC on its first tenure from 2013–14 to 2019–20, until briefly joining the Mid-South Conference (MSC) from 2020–21 to 2022–23. They also competed in the (now defunct) TranSouth Athletic Conference (TSAC) from 1996–97 to 2012–13, and in the Tennessee Collegiate Athletic Conference (TCAC) from 1986–87 to 1995–96.

UT Southern competes in 19 intercollegiate varsity teams: men's sports include baseball, basketball, cross country, golf, soccer, swimming, tennis, and track and field; while women's sports include basketball, cross country, golf, soccer, softball, swimming, tennis, track and field, and volleyball. Competitive cheerleading and competitive clay target shooting are offered as a co-ed sports. Former sports included men's and women's bowling.

Athletic teams at UT Southern have won 12 national championships:

- Men's soccer – NAIA National Champions (2013)
- Women's soccer – Three-time NAIA National Champions (2005, 2007, 2021).
- Competitive cheer – NAIA National Invitational Tournament Champions (2016)
- Clay target team – SCTP Champions (2016–2020) and ACUI Champions (2021, 2022)

== Notable alumni ==
- Sharnol Adriana (1991) former professional baseball player from Curaçao and Olympian for the Netherlands
- John Andrews (2008), former professional soccer player from Ireland and current manager of Knattspyrnufélagið Víkingur
- Chike Augustine (2019), professional basketball player from Trinidad and Tobago
- Ross Bass (1938), member of the United States Senate from Tennessee
- Tenywa Bonseu (1998), former professional soccer player from Uganda
- Adam Darragh (2002), former professional basketball player from Australia
- James Justice, Jr. (2012), former professional basketball player
- Jennifer Muñoz (2016), former professional soccer player representing Guatemala
- John Ogiltree (2000), former professional baseball player from Canada and Olympian for Canada
- Fabiola Sánchez (2016), former professional soccer player from Costa Rica
- Hanit Schwartz (2012), former professional soccer player from Israel
- Mariah Shade (2011), former professional soccer player from Trinidad and Tobago
