= Williams Baptist University =

Private university in Walnut Ridge, Arkansas, U.S.

- Former names: Southern Baptist College (1941–1991); Williams Baptist College (1991–2018)
- Type: Private university
- Established: 1941
- Religious affiliation: Arkansas Baptist State Convention, Southern Baptist Convention
- President: Stan Norman
- Students: 584 (Fall 2022)
- Location: Walnut Ridge, Arkansas, United States; 36°07′32″N 90°56′25″W
- Colors: Blue & White
- Nickname: Eagles
- Sporting affiliations: NAIA – American Midwest
- Mascot: Eagle
- Website: williamsbu.edu

Williams Baptist University is a private university in Walnut Ridge, Arkansas, United States. The university is owned and operated by the Arkansas Baptist State Convention, which is affiliated with the Southern Baptist Convention.

Founded in 1941, this institution began as a two-year school. It began granting bachelor's degrees in 1984 and master's degrees in 2017. The name of the school was changed in 1991 from Southern Baptist College to Williams Baptist College in honor of its founder and first president, H. E. Williams. In 2018, its name was changed to Williams Baptist University. Williams has been accredited since 1963 by the Higher Learning Commission.

== LGBT prohibition ==
WBU has been granted a partial exemption to Title IX that allows it to discriminate against LGBT students for religious reasons. The school does not allow same-sex dating or any type of sex outside of a heterosexual marriage.

== Athletics ==
The Williams Baptist athletic teams are called the Eagles. The university is a member of the National Association of Intercollegiate Athletics (NAIA), primarily competing in the American Midwest Conference (AMC) since the 2001–02 academic year. The Eagles previously competed in the TranSouth Athletic Conference (TranSouth or TSAC) from 1995–96 to 2000–01, and in the Arkansas Intercollegiate Conference (AIC) from about 1990–91 to 1994–95.

Williams Baptist competes in 18 intercollegiate varsity sports: Men's sports include baseball, basketball, cross country, golf, soccer, swimming, track & field, wrestling; while women's sports include basketball, cross country, golf, soccer, softball, swimming, track & field and volleyball; and co-ed sports include cheerleading.

== Notable alumni ==
- Jack Ladyman, mechanical engineer from Jonesboro and Republican member of the Arkansas House of Representatives for a portion of Craighead County
