= TranSouth Athletic Conference =

- Association: NAIA
- Founded: 1996
- Ceased: 2013
- Sports fielded: 13; men's: 6; women's: 7
- No. of teams: 6
- Region: Southeastern United States; Region XI of the NAIA

Locations
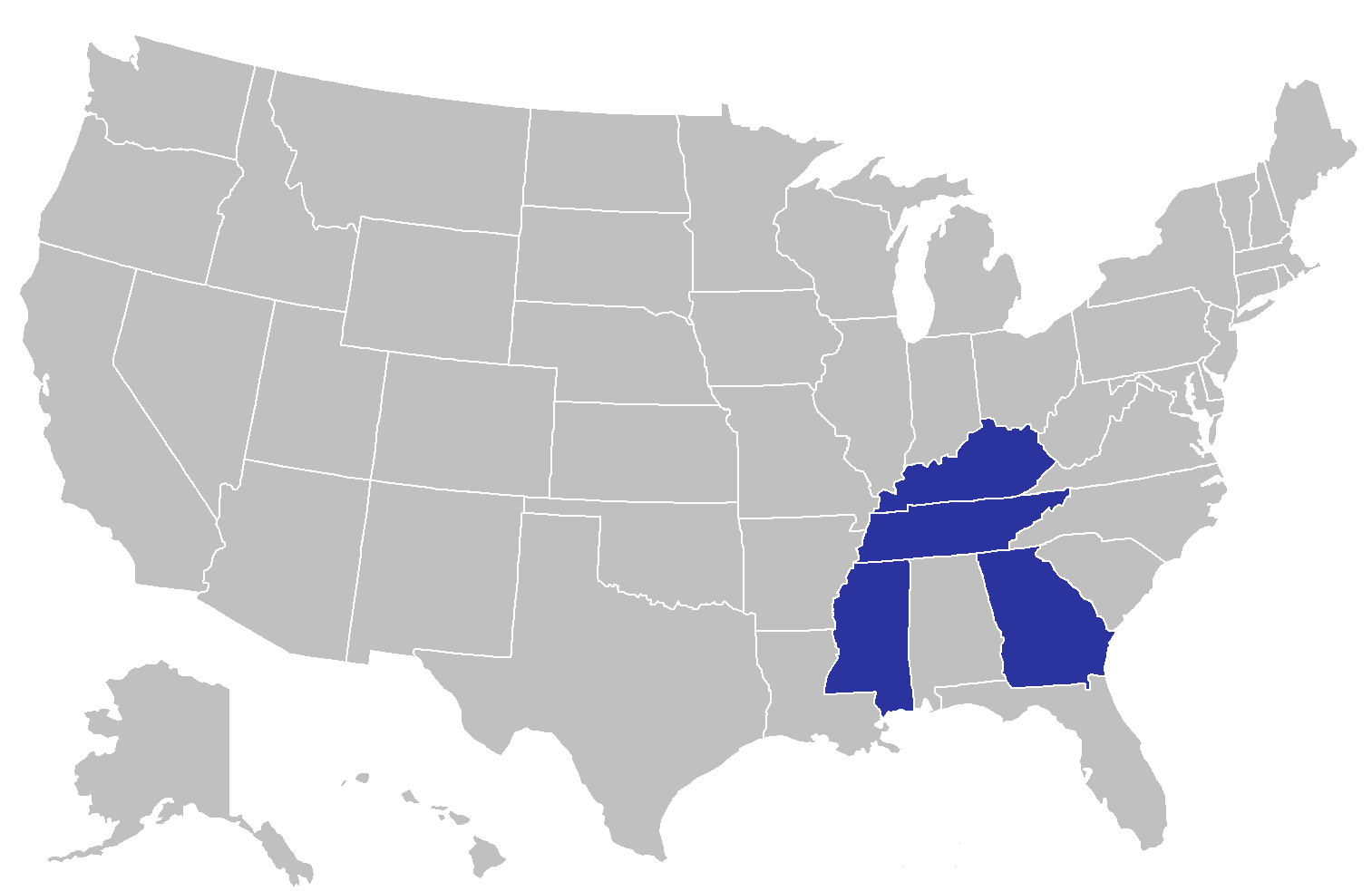

The TranSouth Athletic Conference (TSAC) was a college athletic conference for smaller colleges and universities located in the Southern United States. It was affiliated with the National Association of Intercollegiate Athletics (NAIA) and competes in that organization's Region XI.

== History ==
On August 9, 2012 it was announced that Mid-Continent University had accepted an invitation to join the American Midwest Conference, starting with the 2013-14 season. Later, Bethel, Blue Mountain, and Martin Methodist were announced to be moving to the Southern States Athletic Conference starting with the 2013-14 season.

=== Chronological timeline ===
- 1996 – The TranSouth Athletic Conference (TSAC) was founded from mostly former members of the Tennessee Collegiate Athletic Conference (TCAC). Charter members included Bethel College (now Bethel University), David Lipscomb University (a.k.a. Lipscomb University), Freed–Hardeman University, Martin Methodist College (now the University of Tennessee Southern), Trevecca Nazarene University and Union University, alongside Berry College, Birmingham–Southern College, Blue Mountain College (now Blue Mountain Christian University), Lee College (now Lee University), and Williams Baptist College (now Williams Baptist University) beginning the 1996–97 academic year.
- 1997 – Lyon College joined the TSAC in the 1997–98 academic year.
- 1999 – Bethel (Tenn.) left the TSAC to join the Kentucky Intercollegiate Athletic Conference (KIAC) after the 1998–99 academic year.
- 2001 – Three institutions left the TSAC to join their respective new home primary conferences: Birmingham–Southern and Lipscomb to the Division I ranks of the National Collegiate Athletic Association (NCAA) as NCAA D-II Independents, and Williams Baptist to the American Midwest Conference, all after the 2000–01 academic year.
- 2002 – Cumberland University of Tennessee joined the TSAC in the 2002–03 academic year.
- 2003 – Athens State University joined the TSAC in the 2003–04 academic year
- 2004 – Three institutions left the TSAC to join their respective new home primary conferences: Berry and Lee to the Southern States Athletic Conference (SSAC), and Athens State to discontinue athletics due to lack of sponsored sports, all effective after the 2003–04 academic year.
- 2005 – Crichton College (later Victory University) joined the TSAC in the 2005–06 academic year.
- 2006 – Lambuth University and Mid-Continent University joined the TSAC (with Bethel [Tenn.] re-joining) in the 2006–07 academic year.
- 2008 – Lambuth and Victory (formerly Crichton) left the TSAC to become NAIA Independents as charter members of the Association of Independent Institutions (AII; now the Continental Athletic Conference) after the 2007–08 academic year. At the same time, Lambuth began transition to the NCAA Division II ranks as an NCAA D-II Independent.
- 2012 – Four institutions left the TSAC to join their respective new home primary conferences: Trevecca Nazarene to the Great Midwest Athletic Conference (G-MAC) and Union (Tenn.) to the Gulf South Conference (GSC) (both into the NCAA Division II ranks), Lyon to the American Midwest, and Cumberland (Tenn.) to the Mid-South Conference, all after the 2011–12 academic year.
- 2012 – Life University joined the TSAC in the 2012–13 academic year.
- 2013 – The TSAC would cease operations as an athletic conference after the 2012–13 academic year; as many schools left to join their respective new home primary conferences beginning the 2013–14 academic year: Freed–Hardeman and Mid-Continent to the American Midwest, Bethel (Tenn.), Blue Mountain and Martin Methodist (now UT Southern) to the SSAC, and Life returning as an NAIA Independent (before joining the Mid-South during the 2014–15 academic year).

== Member schools ==
=== Final members ===
On its final season, the TSAC had six member schools, which most were private schools:

Institution	Location	Founded	Affiliation	Enrollment	Nickname	Joined	Left	Subsequent conference	Current conference
Bethel University	McKenzie, Tennessee	1842	Cumberland; Presbyterian	2,975	Wildcats	1996; 2006 (Note: Bethel (Tenn.) left the TSAC after the 1997–98 season; before re-joining in the 2006–07 school year.)	2013	Southern States (SSAC) (2013–20)	Mid-South (MSC) (2020–present)
Blue Mountain College (Note: This institution is a former women's college, which has eventually turned into a co-educational college (Blue Mountain since 2007–08).) (Note: Currently known as Blue Mountain Christian University since November 2022.)	Blue Mountain, Mississippi	1873	Baptist	505	Toppers	1996	2013	Southern States (SSAC) (2013–present)	
Freed–Hardeman University	Henderson, Tennessee	1869	Churches of Christ	2,027	Lions	1996	2013	American Midwest (2013–20)	Mid-South (MSC) (2020–present)
Life University	Marietta, Georgia	1974	Nonsectarian	3,100	Running Eagles	2012	2013	NAIA Independent (2013–14); Mid-South (MSC) (2014–22)	Southern States (SSAC) (2022–present)
Martin Methodist College (Note: Martin Methodist joined the University of Tennessee system in July 2021 to become the University of Tennessee Southern. Before that it was a private institution affiliated with the United Methodist Church.)	Pulaski, Tennessee	1870	United Methodist	1,001	RedHawks (Note: The former Martin Methodist is now competing as the UT Southern FireHawks.)	1996	2013	Southern States (SSAC) (2013–20); Mid-South (MSC) (2020–23)	Southern States (SSAC) (2023–present)
Mid-Continent University	Mayfield, Kentucky	1949	Baptist	1,823	Cougars	2006	2013	American Midwest (2013–14)	Closed in 2014

=== Former members ===
The TSAC had 12 former full member schools, which most were private schools:

Institution	Location	Founded	Affiliation	Enrollment	Nickname	Joined	Left	Subsequent conference(s)	Current conference
Athens State University	Athens, Alabama	1822	Public	3,200	Bears	2003	2004	Discontinued athletics	
Berry College	Mount Berry, Georgia	1902	Nondenominational	1,937	Vikings	1996	2004	Southern States (SSAC) (2004–10); D-III Independent (2010–13)	Southern (SAA) (Note: Currently an NCAA Division III athletic conference.) (2013–present)
Birmingham–Southern College	Birmingham, Alabama	1856	United; Methodist	1,400	Panthers	1996	2001	various (Note: Birmingham–Southern had joined the following subsequent conferences: the Big South Conference (Note: Currently an NCAA Division I athletic conference.) from 2001–02 to 2006–07; the Southern Collegiate Athletic Conference (SCAC) from 2007–08 to 2012–13; and the Southern Athletic Association (SAA) from 2013–14 to 2023–24.)	Closed in 2024
Cumberland University	Lebanon, Tennessee	1842	Nonsectarian	1,500	Bulldogs (Note: Cumberland (Tenn.) changed its nickname from Bulldogs to Phoenix in 2016.)	2002	2012	Mid-South (MSC) (2012–present)	
Lambuth University	Jackson, Tennessee	1843	United; Methodist	800	Eagles	2006	2008	NAIA Independent (2008–09); D-II Independent (2009–11)	Closed in 2011
Lipscomb University	Nashville, Tennessee	1891	Churches of Christ	4,278	Bisons	1996	2001	D-I Independent (2001–03)	Atlantic Sun (ASUN) (2003–present)
Lee University	Cleveland, Tennessee	1918	Church of God	4,954	Flames	1996	2004	Southern States (SSAC) (2004–13)	Gulf South (GSC) (Note: Currently an NCAA Division II athletic conference.) (2013–present)
Lyon College	Batesville, Arkansas	1872	Presbyterian (PCUSA)	600	Scots	1997	2012	American Midwest (2012–2023)	St. Louis (SLIAC) (2023–present)
Trevecca Nazarene University	Nashville, Tennessee	1901	Nazarene	2,345	Trojans	1996	2012	Great Midwest (G-MAC) (2012–2024)	Gulf South (GSC) (2024–present)
Union University	Jackson, Tennessee	1823	Baptist	4,259	Bulldogs	1996	2012	Gulf South (GSC) (2012–present)	
Victory University (Note: Formerly known as Crichton College until 2010.)	Memphis, Tennessee	1941	Nondenominational	1,970	Eagles	2005	2008	various (Note: Victory (formerly Crichton) had joined the following subsequent conferences: as an NAIA Independent during the 2008–09 school year (before discontinuing athletics); and as an Independent within the National Christian Collegiate Athletic Association (NCCAA) and the United States Collegiate Athletic Association (USCAA) from 2010–11 to 2013–14.)	Closed in 2014
Williams Baptist University (Note: Formerly known as Williams Baptist College until 2018.)	Walnut Ridge, Arkansas	1941	Baptist	700	Eagles	1996	2000	NAIA Independent (2000–01)	American Midwest (2001–present)

=== Membership timeline ===
Full member (non-football)

== Sponsored sports ==
Men's sponsored sports were baseball, basketball, cross country, golf, soccer, and tennis. Women's sports sponsored were basketball, cross country, golf, soccer, softball, tennis, and volleyball.
