= Lipscomb Bisons =

Sports teams representing Lipscomb University

- University: Lipscomb University
- Conference: Atlantic Sun Conference (primary)
- NCAA: Division I
- Athletic director: Philip Hutcheson
- Location: Nashville, Tennessee
- Varsity teams: 15 (7 men's, 8 women's)
- Basketball arena: Allen Arena
- Baseball stadium: Dugan Field
- Softball stadium: Draper Diamond
- Soccer stadium: Lipscomb Soccer Complex
- Tennis venue: Huston-Marsh-Griffith Tennis Center
- Mascot: LU Bison
- Nickname: Bisons
- Colors: Purple and gold
- Website: lipscombsports.com

The Lipscomb Bisons are the athletic teams that represent Lipscomb University, located in Nashville, Tennessee, in intercollegiate sports as a member of the NCAA Division I ranks, primarily competing in the Atlantic Sun Conference (ASUN) since the 2003–04 academic year. The Bisons previously competed in National Association of Intercollegiate Athletics (NAIA) conferences: the Volunteer State Athletic Conference (VSAC) until the 1984–85 school year, the Tennessee Collegiate Athletic Conference (TCAC) from 1985–86 to 1995–96, and the TranSouth Athletic Conference (TranSouth or TSAC) from 1996–97 to 2000–01. Their mascot is LU the Bison.

== Conference affiliations ==
NAIA

- Volunteer State Athletic Conference – pre-1985
- Tennessee Collegiate Athletic Conference – 1985–86 to 1995–96
- TranSouth Athletic Conference – 1996–97 to 2000–01

NCAA

- NCAA Division I independent – 2001–02 to 2002–03
- Atlantic Sun Conference – 2003–04 to Present

== Sponsored sports ==
Lipscomb competes in 17 intercollegiate varsity sports: Men's sports include baseball, basketball, cross country, golf, soccer, tennis and track & field (indoor and outdoor); basketball, cross country, golf, soccer, softball, tennis, track & field (indoor and outdoor) and volleyball.

Men's sports	Women's sports
Baseball	Basketball
Basketball	Cross country
Cross country	Golf
Golf	Soccer
Soccer	Softball
Tennis	Tennis
Track and field^{†}	Track and field^{†}
	Volleyball
† – Track and field includes both indoor and outdoor

A member of the Atlantic Sun Conference (ASUN), Lipscomb sponsors teams in eight men's and nine women's NCAA sanctioned sports.

== National championships ==
=== Team ===
Sport	Association	Division	Year	Runner-up	Score
Baseball (2)	NAIA (2)	Single (2)	1977	SE Oklahoma State	2–1
Baseball (2)	NAIA (2)	Single (2)	1979	High Point	5–4
Basketball	NAIA	Single	1986	Arkansas–Montichello	67–54
