= Midlands Collegiate Athletic Conference =

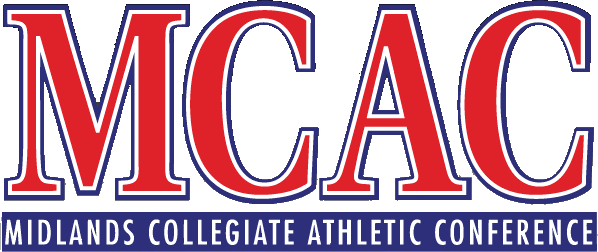
- Association: NAIA
- Founded: 1994
- Folded: 2015
- Sports fielded: 11; men's: 5; women's: 6
- Division: Division II
- No. of teams: 9
- Region: Central United States; Region IV

Locations
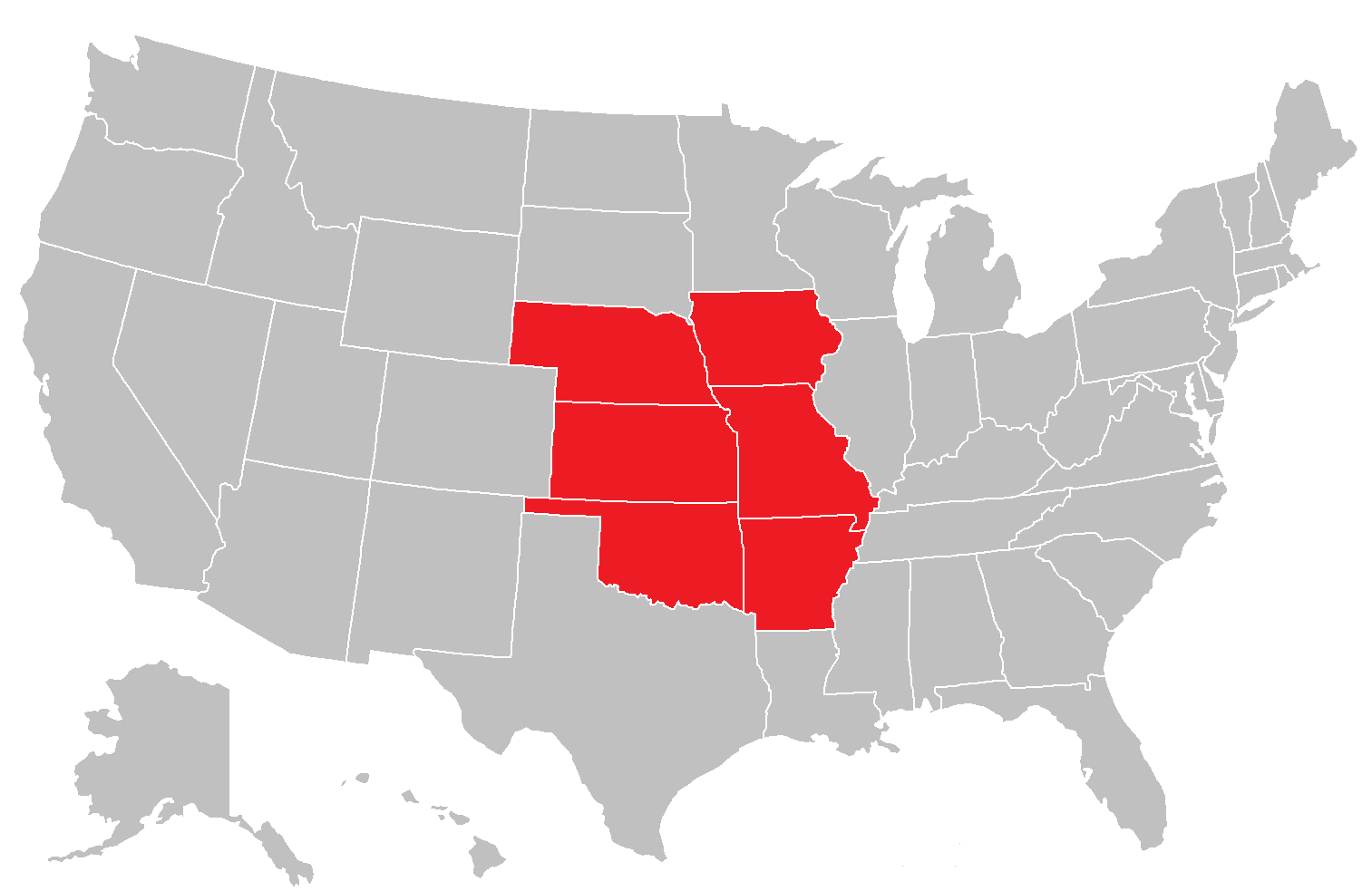

The Midlands Collegiate Athletic Conference (MCAC) was an intercollegiate athletic conference that competed in National Association of Intercollegiate Athletics. Members of the conference were located in the Midwest United States and were located in Kansas, Missouri, Nebraska, Iowa, Arkansas, and Oklahoma.

== History ==
=== Commissioners ===
From 1994 when MCAC was established, to the time it dissolved in 2015, the conference only had two commissioners.

1. Carl R. Clapp (1994–1995)
2. Al Waller (1996–2015)

=== Conference presidents ===
The conference has board made up of representatives from the member institutions, and one person from a school is selected as the board's president for two years.

1. Larry Kramer, Avila College (1994–96)
2. Paul Mills, Wesleyan College (1996–98)
3. Sr. Tarcisia Roths, Newman University (1998–2000)
4. Wayne Baker, York College (2000–02)
5. Aidan Dunleavy, Newman University (2002–04)
6. Ben Johnson, Peru State College (2004–06)
7. Wayne Baker, York College (2006–08)
8. Maryanne Stevens, College of Saint Mary (2008–10)
9. Steve Eckman, York College (2010–12)
10. Hal Hoxie Central Christian College (2012–15)

=== Chronological timeline ===
- 1994 – The Midlands Collegiate Athletic Conference (MCAC) was founded. Charter members included Avila College (now Avila University), Bellevue College (now Bellevue University), Bartlesville Wesleyan College (now Oklahoma Wesleyan University), the School of the Ozarks (now the College of the Ozarks), Park College (now Park University), the Saint Mary College of Kansas (now the University of Saint Mary of Kansas), the College of Saint Mary of Nebraska and York College (now York University), beginning the 1994–95 academic year.
- 1999 – Saint Mary (Ks.) left the MCAC to join the Kansas Collegiate Athletic Conference (KCAC) after the 1998–99 academic year.
- 1999 – Newman University of Kansas joined the MCAC in the 1999–2000 academic year.
- 2000 – Avila left the MCAC to join the Heart of America Athletic Conference (HAAC) after the 1999–2000 academic year.
- 2000 – Peru State College joined the MCAC in the 2000–01 academic year.
- 2001 – Haskell Indian Nations University joined the MCAC in the 2001–02 academic year.
- 2002 – Central Christian College of Kansas joined the MCAC in the 2002–03 academic year.
- 2006 – Newman left the MCAC to join the Division II ranks of the National Collegiate Athletic Association (NCAA) and the Heartland Conference after the 2005–06 academic year.
- 2009 – Park U. left the MCAC to join the American Midwest Conference after the 2008–09 academic year.
- 2010 – Southwestern Christian University joined the MCAC in the 2010–11 academic year.
- 2011 – Peru State left the MCAC to join the HAAC after the 2010–11 academic year.
- 2011 – Central Baptist College joined the MCAC in the 2011–12 academic year.
- 2012 – Waldorf College (later Waldorf University) joined the MCAC in the 2012–13 academic year.
- 2013 – Southwestern Christian left the MCAC to join the Sooner Athletic Conference (SAC) after the 2012–13 academic year.
- 2015 – The MCAC ceased operations as an athletic conference after the 2014–15 academic year; as many schools left to join their respective new home primary conferences, beginning the 2015–16 academic year:
  - Central Baptist to the American Midwest
  - Saint Mary (Neb.) to the Great Plains Athletic Conference (GPAC)
  - Central Christian (who would later join the SAC in the 2017–18 school year) and the CofO to the Association of Independent Institutions (AII)
  - and Oklahoma Wesleyan and York (Neb.) to the KCAC (York joined later in the 2016–17 school year after spending a season as a member of the AII)
  - and Bellevue and Waldorf to the North Star Athletic Association (NSAA)

== Member schools ==
=== Final members ===
The MCAC had nine full members in the conference's final season, most were private schools:

Institution	Location	Founded	Affiliation	Enrollment	Nickname	Joined (Note: Represents the calendar year when fall sports competition begins.)	Left (Note: Represents the calendar year when spring sports competition ends.)	Subsequent conference	Current conference
Bellevue University	Bellevue, Nebraska	1966	Nonsectarian	10,407	Bruins	1994	2015	North Star (NSAA) (2015–25)	Frontier (2025–present)
Central Baptist College	Conway, Arkansas	1952	Baptist Missionary	739	Mustangs	2011	2015	American Midwest (2015–present)	
Central Christian College of Kansas	McPherson, Kansas	1884	Free Methodist	1,013	Tigers	2002	2015	NAIA Independent/AII (2015–17)	Sooner (SAC) (2017–present)
Haskell Indian Nations University	Lawrence, Kansas	1884	Public	958	Fighting; Indians	2001	2015	NAIA Independent/AII (2015–present)	
Oklahoma Wesleyan University	Bartlesville, Oklahoma	1959	Wesleyan Church	1,103	Eagles	1994	2015	Kansas (KCAC) (2015–present)	
College of the Ozarks	Point Lookout, Missouri	1906	Presbyterian (PCUSA)	1,508	Bobcats	1994	2015	NAIA Independent/AII (2015–21; 2015–21); NCCAA Independent (2021–23)	Sooner (SAC) (2024–present)
College of Saint Mary	Omaha, Nebraska	1923	Catholic (R.S.M.)	1,070	Flames	1994	2015	Great Plains (GPAC) (2015–present)	
Waldorf College (Note: Currently known as Waldorf University since 2016.)	Forest City, Iowa	1903	For-profit (Note: Formerly affiliated with the Evangelical Lutheran Church in America (ELCA) until 2010.)	580	Warriors	2012	2015	North Star (NSAA) (2015–24)	Great Plains (GPAC) (2024–present)
York College (Note: Currently known as York University since 2022.)	York, Nebraska	1890	Churches of Christ	459	Panthers	1994	2015	NAIA Independent/AII (2015–16)	Kansas (KCAC) (2016–present)

=== Former members ===
The MCAC had six other full members during the conference's tenure, most were private schools:

Institution	Location	Founded	Affiliation	Enrollment	Nickname	Joined (Note: Represents the calendar year when fall sports competition begins.)	Left (Note: Represents the calendar year when spring sports competition ends.)	Subsequent conference	Current conference
Avila University	Kansas City, Missouri	1916	Catholic (C.S.J.)	1,676	Eagles	1994	2000	Heart of America (HAAC) (2000–18)	Kansas (KCAC) (2018–present)
Newman University	Wichita, Kansas	1933	Catholic (A.S.C.)	3,170	Jets	1999	2006	Heartland (Note: Currently an NCAA Division II athletic conference.) (2006–19)	Mid-America (MIAA) (2019–present)
Park University (Note: Park was a non-basketball member school on the men's and women's sides in their tenure in the MCAC.)	Parkville, Missouri	1875	Nonsectarian	2,340	Pirates	1994	2009	American Midwest (2009–20)	Heart of America (HAAC) (2020–present)
Peru State College	Peru, Nebraska	1865	Public	2,422	Bobcats	2000	2011	Heart of America (HAAC) (2011–present)	
University of Saint Mary	Leavenworth, Kansas	1859	Catholic (S.C.L.)	750	Spires	1994	1999	Kansas (KCAC) (1999–present)	
Southwestern Christian University	Bethany, Oklahoma	1946	Pentecostal	764	Eagles	2010	2013	Sooner (SAC) (2013–present)	

=== Membership timeline ===
Full member (non-football)

== Conference sports ==
The Midlands Collegiate Athletic Conference fielded 11 sports (5 men's and 6 women's), which includes:

Conference sports
Sport	Men's	Women's
Baseball	✓	
Basketball	✓	✓
Cross Country	✓	✓
Golf	✓	✓
Soccer	✓	✓
Softball		✓
Volleyball		✓
