= Hugo McCord =

American preacher and biblical scholar

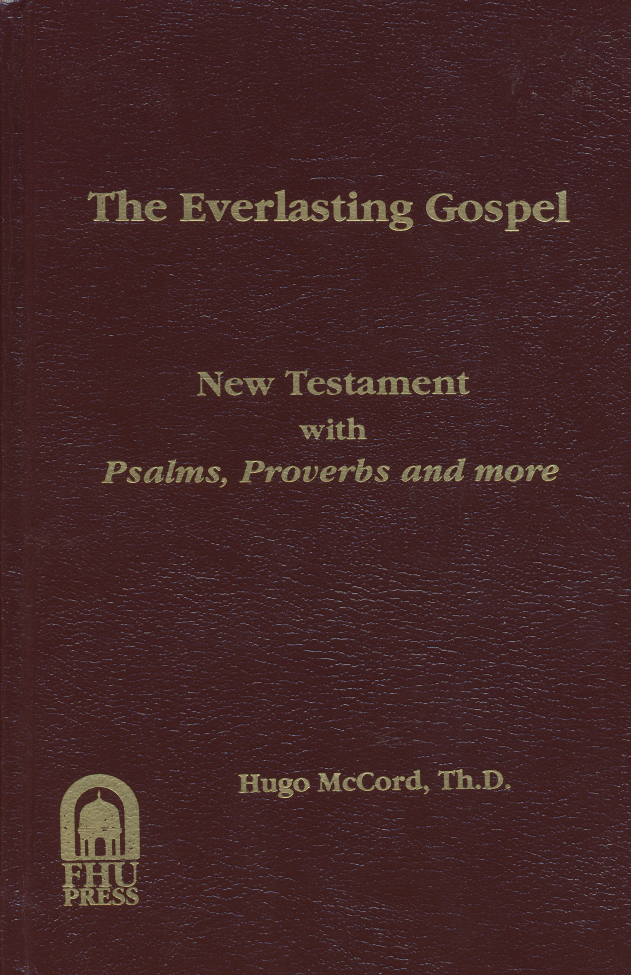
McCord's translation of the New Testament, Everlasting Gospel, 2000, 4th edition

Hugo McCord (1911–2004) was an American preacher and biblical scholar within the Churches of Christ in America. He produced his own translation of the New Testament (and Genesis, Psalms, and Proverbs), titled The Everlasting Gospel, which he affectionately called the Freed-Hardeman Version.

McCord attended a number of schools: Freed–Hardeman College (now Freed–Hardeman University), the University of Illinois Urbana-Champaign (1933–1935), the University of Tulsa, the Southern Baptist Theological Seminary, New Orleans Baptist Theological Seminary. In addition to serving as a preacher in a number of congregations, he taught at Oklahoma Christian College (now Oklahoma Christian University).

Among his many converts he baptized American church historian Earl Irvin West in 1935.
