= Tennessee Collegiate Athletic Conference =

Former college athletic conference

TCAC logo

The Tennessee Collegiate Athletic Conference (TCAC) was a college athletic conference affiliated with the National Association of Intercollegiate Athletics (NAIA); which was predominantly for smaller, private colleges in western and middle Tennessee.

== History ==
The TCAC was created in 1985 from the western division of the old Volunteer State Athletic Conference. The charter members were Belmont University, Bethel College, Christian Brothers University, Cumberland University, David Lipscomb University, Freed–Hardeman University, Lambuth University, Martin Methodist College, Trevecca Nazarene University, and Union University. The TCAC survived in that form until 1995 when both Belmont and Christian Brothers announced their intentions to go to the NCAA. The remaining teams formed a new conference, the TranSouth Athletic Conference which existed until the 2012–13 school year.

=== Chronological timeline ===
- 1985 – The Tennessee Collegiate Athletic Conference (TCAC) was founded. Charter members included Belmont University, Bethel College, Christian Brothers University, Cumberland University, David Lipscomb University, Freed–Hardeman University, Lambuth University, Trevecca Nazarene University and Union University, beginning the 1985–86 academic year.
- 1994 – Martin Methodist College (now the University of Tennessee Southern) joined the TCAC in the 1994–95 academic year.
- 1996 - The TCAC would cease operations as an athletic conference after the 1995–96 academic year; as many schools left to join their respective new home primary conferences, beginning the 1996–97 academic year: Bethel (Tenn.), David Lipscomb, Freed–Hardeman, Martin Methodist (now UT Southern), Trevecca Nazarene and Union (Tenn.) to form the TranSouth Athletic Conference (TranSouth or TSAC); with Cumberland (Tenn.) and Lambuth to the Mid-South Conference (MSC); Belmont to the Division I ranks of the National Collegiate Athletic Association (NCAA) as an NCAA D-I Independent (which would later join the Atlantic Sun Conference, beginning the 2001–02 school year); and Christian Brothers to the NCAA Division II ranks and the Gulf South Conference (GSC).

== Member schools ==
=== Final members ===
Institution	Location (Note: All cities were located in the State of Tennessee.)	Founded	Affiliation	Enrollment	Nickname	Joined (Note: Represents the calendar year when fall sports competition begins.)	Left (Note: Represents the calendar year when spring sports competition ends.)	Subsequent conference(s)	Current conference
Belmont University	Nashville	1890	Nondenominational	8,700	Bruins	1985	1996	various (Note: Belmont had joined the following subsequent conferences: as an NCAA D-I Independent from 1996–97 to 2000–01; the Atlantic Sun Conference from 2001–02 to 2011–12; and the Ohio Valley Conference (OVC) from 2012–13 to 2021–22.)	Missouri Valley (MVC) (Note: Currently an NCAA Division I athletic conference.) (2022–present)
Bethel College (Note: Currently known as Bethel University since 2009.)	McKenzie	1842	Cumberland; Presbyterian	2,975	Wildcats	1985	1996	various (Note: Bethel (Tenn.) had joined the following subsequent conferences: the TranSouth Athletic Conference (TSAC) from 1996–97 to 1997–98 (and again from 2006–07 to 2012–13); the Kentucky Intercollegiate Athletic Conference (KIAC) from 1998–99 to 2005–06; and the Southern States Athletic Conference (SSAC) from 2013–14 to 2019–20.)	Mid-South (MSC) (2020–present)
Christian Brothers University	Memphis	1871	Catholic (R.S.F.)	1,968	Buccaneers	1985	1996	Gulf South (GSC) (Note: Currently an NCAA Division II athletic conference.) (1996–present); Mid-South (MSC) in 2027	
Cumberland University	Lebanon	1842	Nonsectarian	1,500	Bulldogs (Note: Cumberland (Tenn.) changed its nickname from Bulldogs to Phoenix in 2016.)	1985	1996	Mid-South (MSC) (1996–2002); TranSouth (TSAC) (2002–12)	Mid-South (MSC) (2012–present)
David Lipscomb University	Nashville	1891	Churches of Christ	4,278	Bisons	1985	1996	TranSouth (TSAC) (1996–2001); D-I Independent (2001–03)	Atlantic Sun (ASUN) (2003–present)
Freed–Hardeman University	Henderson	1869	Churches of Christ	2,027	Lions	1985	1996	TranSouth (TSAC) (1996–2013); American Midwest (AMC) (2013–20)	Mid-South (MSC) (2020–present)
Lambuth University	Jackson	1843	United; Methodist	800	Eagles	1985	1996	various (Note: Lambuth had joined the following subsequent conferences: the Mid-South Conference (MSC) from 1996–97 to 2005–06; the TranSouth Athletic Conference (TSAC) from 2006–07 to 2008–09; and as an NAIA/NCAA D-II Independent from 2009–10 to 2010–11.)	Closed in 2011
Martin Methodist College (Note: Currently known as the University of Tennessee Southern since 2021.)	Pulaski	1870	Public (Note: UT Southern (formerly Martin Methodist) was a private institution affiliated with the United Methodist Church until July 2021.)	1,000	FireHawks	1994	1996	various (Note: UT Southern (formerly Martin Methodist) had joined the following subsequent conferences: the TranSouth Athletic Conference (TSAC) from 1996–97 to 2012–13; the Southern States Athletic Conference (SSAC) from 2013–14 to 2019–20; and the Mid-South Conference (MSC) from 2020–21 to 2022–23.)	Southern States (SSAC) (2023–present)
Trevecca Nazarene University (Note: Formerly known as Trevecca Nazarene College until 1995.)	Nashville	1901	Nazarene	2,345	Trojans	1985	1996	TranSouth (TSAC) (1996–2012); Great Midwest (G-MAC) (2012–24)	Gulf South (GSC) (2024–present)
Union University	Jackson	1823	Baptist	4,259	Bulldogs	1985	1996	TranSouth (TSAC) (1996–2012)	Gulf South (GSC) (2012–present)

=== Membership timeline ===
Full member (non-football)

== Sponsored sports ==
The TCAC sponsored 9 sports for men and women including baseball, basketball, golf, tennis, softball, and volleyball. Bethel and Cumberland play football in the Mid-South Conference.

Defunct Lambuth also played football.
