= Battle of the Boulevard =

College basketball rivalry in Tennessee, United States

- Belmont Bruins Lipscomb Bisons
- Sport: Basketball
- First meeting: December 11, 1953; Belmont 72, Lipscomb 53
- Latest meeting: November 10, 2026; Lipscomb 88, Belmont 75
- Next meeting: 2027

Statistics
- Total meetings: 153
- All-time series: Lipscomb 77–76
- Largest victory: Lipscomb, 105–68 (1986)
- Longest win streak: Belmont, 11 (2012–2017)
- Current win streak: Lipscomb, 1 (2026–present)

Locations of Belmont and Lipscomb

The Battle of the Boulevard, also referred to as the Belmont–Lipscomb basketball rivalry is a college basketball rivalry between the Belmont University Bruins and the Lipscomb University Bisons. Its nickname was established because of both school's close placement in Nashville, Tennessee– about three miles apart on the same road. The rivalry was classified as non-conference following Belmont's departure from the Atlantic Sun Conference prior to the 2012–13 NCAA Division I basketball season. Their first meeting took place on December 11, 1953. It is one of the geographically closest rivalries in NCAA Division I.

== Series history ==
Officially the first meeting took place on December 11, 1953, with Belmont emerging victorious 72–53. Neither team was in the NCAA.

Perhaps one of the more memorable college basketball games between Belmont University and Lipscomb University was played on February 17, 1990 in front of an NAIA-record sellout crowd of 15,399 at Memorial Gymnasium (Vanderbilt University) in Nashville, Tennessee. Lipscomb, coached by Don Meyer, won 124–105. Rick Byrd was the head coach of Belmont. Current Lipscomb and Belmont athletics directors, Philip Hutcheson of Lipscomb and Scott Corley of Belmont, played in the game. Hutcheson said, "If you looked at Belmont’s box score alone you could have never imagined that they lost the game with the points they scored and the stat lines they had." The game was promoted by Rick Regen and the Nashville Athletic Club. The tickets were $10.00 with proceeds going to both athletic departments and $40,000 donated to the Burns Center at Vanderbilt Hospital. Lipscomb was ranked No. 1 in the NAIA and Belmont No. 9. Lipscomb moved to 33–4 overall and 15–0 in the TCAC (Tennessee Collegiate Athletic Conference). The win gave them their third straight regular season championship. Belmont was 26–6 and 13–2 in the TCAC. Jerry Meyer, son of Lipscomb head coach Don Meyer, played in the game as a freshman. The crowd for the game could have been larger as hundreds were left outside because the gym was filled to capacity. Lipscomb hit 47-of-75 of their field goal shots (62.7%) and Belmont made 43-of-82 (51.8%). Belmont outrebounded Lipscomb, 46–30. Joe Behling, the Belmont All-American and Hall of Famer, had a game-high 45 points. Lipscomb’s All-American and Hall of Famer, Philip Hutcheson scored 30 points to lead the Bison. Wade Tomlinson of Lipscomb scored 25 Jonathan Seamon and Wil Thornthwaite were the broadcasters for Lipscomb while Gregory Ruff and Belmont legend Ron Bargatze broadcast for Belmont. Seamon is in the Lipscomb and NAIA Hall of Fame. He later served as athletic director and still broadcasts the Bison televised games. Bargatze is a former Vanderbilt, Trevecca, and Austin Peay coach. Ruff is now the Associate Athletic Director at Trevecca and serves as the Voice of Trevecca. He started the first Belmont radio broadcasts on WAMB 1160 in 1988 and continued as the Voice of the Belmont Bruins for more than 10 years. The game was full of stars for both programs. Most played their high school ball in the Middle Tennessee area. Darren Henrie from Williamson County. Henrie scored 21 points for the Bison and teammate Marcus Bodie, normally a defensive specialist, scored 20. Greg Thurman scored 20 for the Bruins while Scott Corley added 19. Corley, who is not the AD at Belmont, later became the color analyst for the Bruins with Ruff.

On January 27, 2004, both teams met in NCAA Division I conference play for the first time, with Belmont prevailing 66–64 in overtime.

On March 4, 2006, the two met in the finals of the Atlantic Sun tournament, with the winner earning the conference's automatic bid to the NCAA tournament. Although both schools compiled a rich NAIA post-season history, neither had ever made an NCAA tournament appearance. Lipscomb guard James Poindexter drained a three-pointer with 27.7 seconds remaining in regulation to stake Lipscomb to a 58–55 lead, but Belmont guard Justin Hare responded with a driving layup, and was fouled with 20.7 seconds remaining. After making the tying free-throw, the game went into overtime, where Belmont won 74–69.

Despite playing in different conferences since the start of the 2012–13 season, the two schools agreed to continue playing each other.
