= Ouachita Baptist University =

Baptist university in Arkadelphia, Arkansas, US

- Former name: Ouachita Baptist College (1886–1965)
- Motto: Vision. Integrity. Service.
- Type: Private
- Established: 1886; 140 years ago
- Religious affiliation: Arkansas Baptist State Convention
- Academic affiliations: Space-grant
- Endowment: $65.4 million
- President: Ben Sells
- Faculty: 109 full-time and 51 part-time (fall 2022)
- Students: 1,784 (fall 2022)
- Undergraduates: 1,730
- Postgraduates: 54
- Location: Arkadelphia, Arkansas, United States; 34°7′30″N 93°3′10″W
- Campus: 160 acres (65 ha); Rural
- Colors: Purple and Gold
- Nickname: Tigers
- Mascot: Tiger
- Website: obu.edu

Ouachita Baptist University (OBU) (/ˈwɑːʃɪtɑː/ WAH-shi-tah) is a private Christian university in Arkadelphia, Arkansas, United States. It is affiliated with the Arkansas Baptist State Convention, a state convention affiliated with the Southern Baptist Convention. The university's name is taken from the Ouachita River, which forms the eastern campus boundary.

== History ==
Ouachita Baptist University was founded as Ouachita Baptist College on September 6, 1886, and has operated continually since that date. It was originally located on the campus of Ouachita Baptist High School. Its current location is on the former campus of the Arkansas School for the Blind, which relocated to Little Rock.

The first president was J. W. Conger, who was elected to the post on June 22, 1886. The OBU Board of Trustees unanimously elected Dr. Ben Sells, former vice president for university advancement at Taylor University, as the sixteenth president of Ouachita Baptist University on April 7, 2016. Those who have served as president include J. W. Conger (1886–1907), Henry Simms Hartzog (1907–1911), R. G. Bowers (1911–1913), Samuel Young Jameson (1913–1916), Charles Ernest Dicken (1916–1926), Arthur B. Hill (1926–1929), Charles D. Johnson (1929–1933), James R. Grant (1933–1949), Seaford Eubanks (1949–1951), Harold A. Haswell (1952–1953), Ralph Arloe Phelps Jr. (1953–1969), Daniel R. Grant (1970–1988), Ben M. Elrod (1988–1998), Andrew Westmoreland (1998–2006) and Rex Horne (2006–2015).

In 1965 the college changed its name to Ouachita Baptist University.

In April 2025, faculty members passed a vote of no confidence in university president Ben Sells. The board of trustees affirmed support for Sells the next day.

== Academics ==
Academic rankings

Liberal arts
- U.S. News & World Report: 151 (tie) of 183
- Washington Monthly: 169 of 190

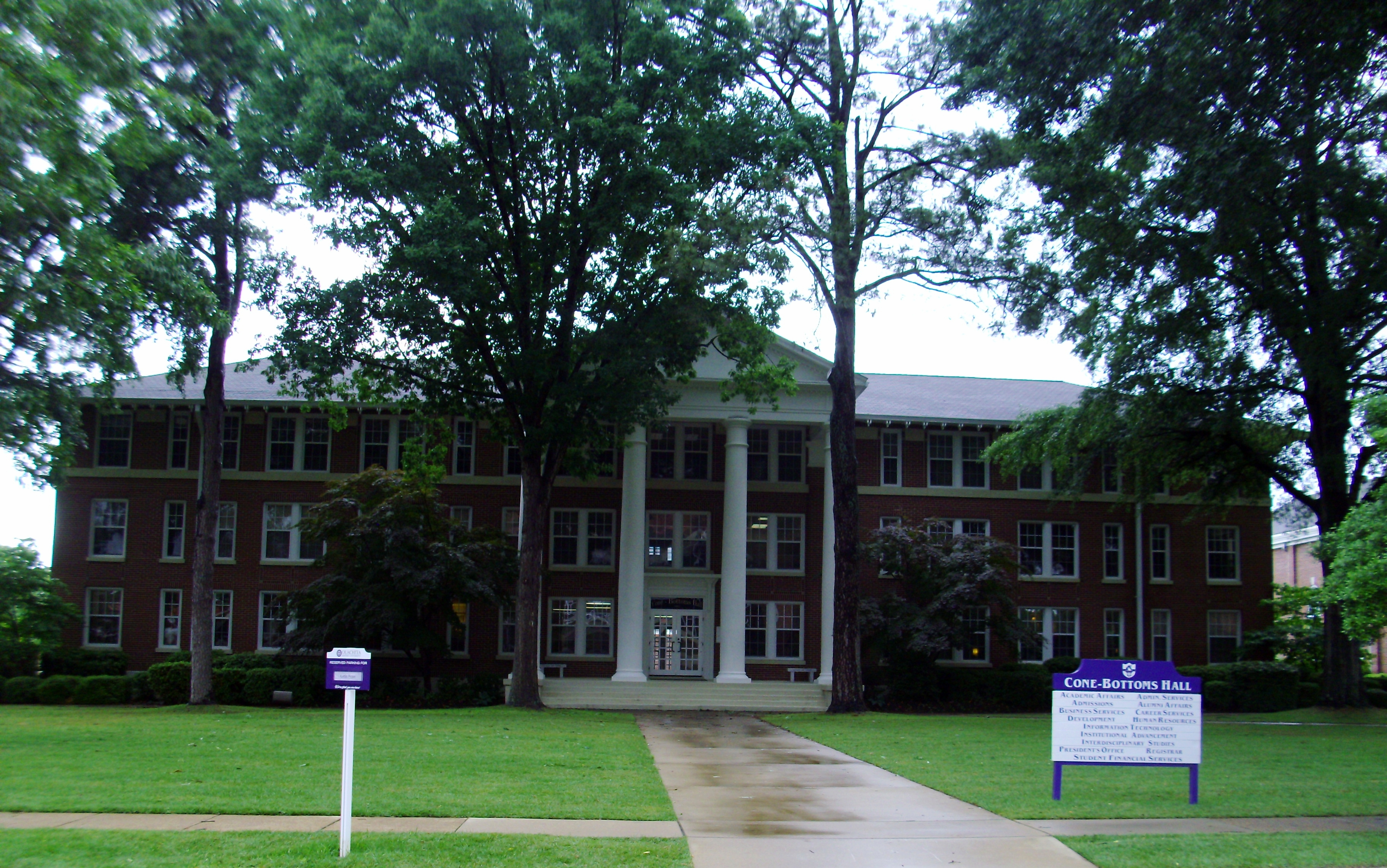
Cone-Bottoms Hall, home to the Grant Administration Center, is the oldest building on campus

The university is accredited by the Higher Learning Commission with specific programs accredited by the Association to Advance Collegiate Schools of Business (AACSB International), National Council for the Accreditation of Teacher Education (NCATE), National Association for Schools of Music, the Commission on the Accreditation of Athletic Training Education Programs (CAATE), and the Commission on Accreditation for Dietetics Education (CADE) of the American Dietetic Association.

The university was ranked tied for 151 of 183 in the 2025 National Liberal Arts Colleges rankings by U.S. News & World Report.

== Athletics ==
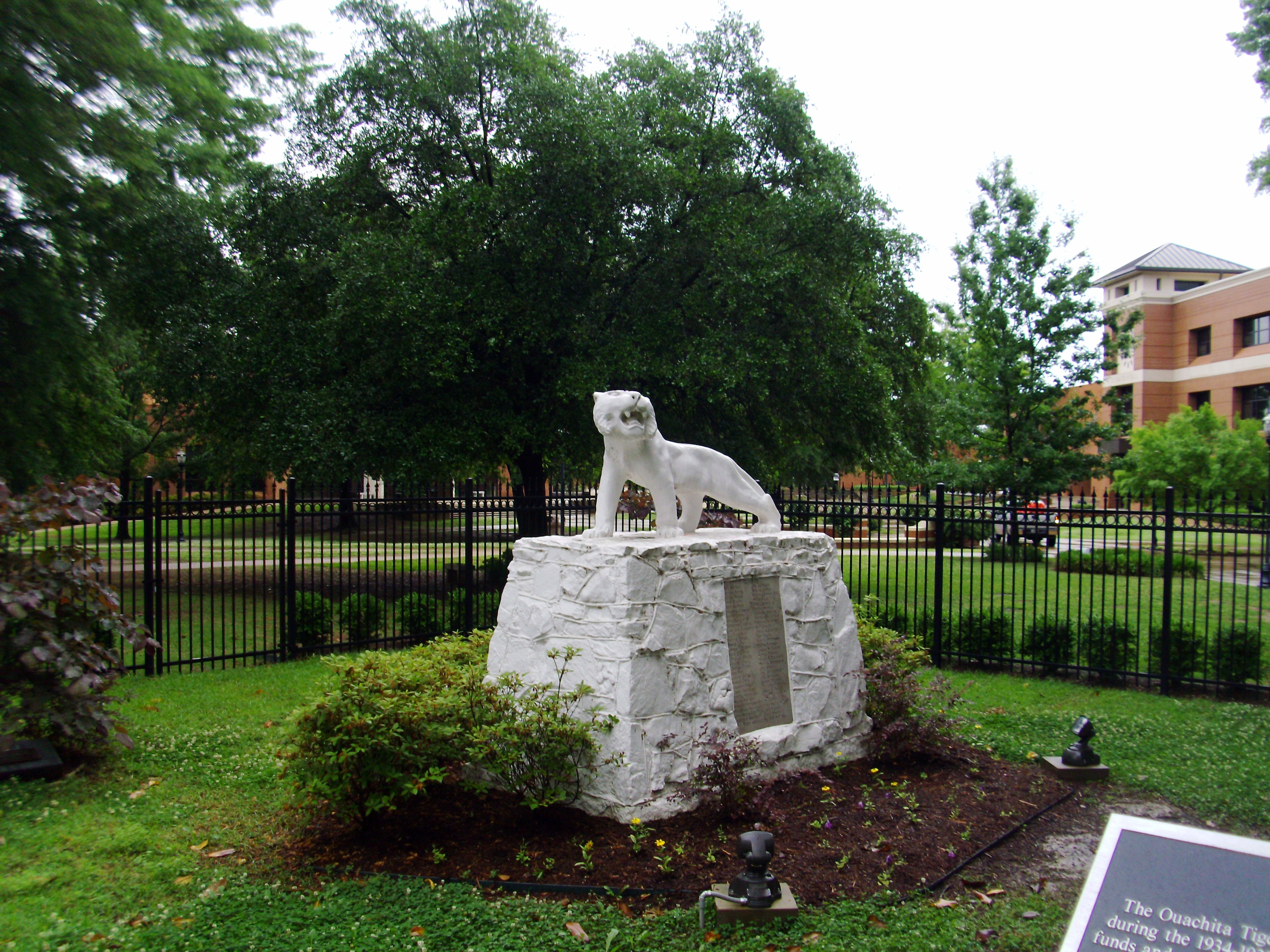
Ouachita's Tiger statue has stood on campus since 1935

OBU fields intercollegiate men's teams in baseball, basketball, football, soccer, swimming, tennis, cross country, and wrestling. Women's sports include basketball, cross country, soccer, softball, swimming, tennis and volleyball.

The school mascot is the Tiger, and colors are purple and gold. As of fall 2011, Ouachita began competition in the Great American Conference.

The Tigers football team were the conference champions of the inaugural 2011 season and the 2014, 2017, 2018, and 2019 seasons. In wrestling, a sport not sponsored by the GAC, OBU competes as a single-sport member of the Great Lakes Valley Conference.

In 2010, Ouachita Baptist was the first university in Arkansas to offer an NCAA wrestling program. Dallas Smith, a four-time All-American, earned the program's first national title at the NCAA Division II National Championships in 2015.

== Student newspaper ==
The Signal is the weekly student newspaper of Ouachita Baptist University. It began as a combination newspaper/literary magazine known as the Ouachita Ripples, published monthly. The first issue was printed in March 1890. On Sept. 22, 1917, the publication changed its name to Ouachita Baptist College Signal-Ripples. "Ripples" was later dropped and the publication became known as The Signal. The paper has received the Gold Medalist rating from the Columbia Scholastic Press Association, and the online edition has received a Pacemaker award from the Associated Collegiate Press.
