= John Ogiltree =

Canadian former baseball pitcher (born 1978)

John Ogiltree (born June 3, 1978) is a Canadian former baseball pitcher.

Born in Toronto, he is a graduate of Martin Methodist College.

At the age of 18, he was originally taken in the 1996 draft in the 32nd round (941st overall) by Detroit Tigers but decided to attend college instead.

In 2000, he debuted for the Canada national baseball team, in the qualifiers for the 2001 Baseball World Cup. The right-hander, at 6' 8", was 7–3 with a 2.30 earned run average (ERA) and 97 strikeouts through 74 1/3 innings pitched as a senior in 2001, making honorable mention on the SLAM! Canadian Baseball All-Canadian team.

He was signed by their chief Canadian scout, the late Jim Ridley, for the Toronto Blue Jays as an undrafted free agent after his senior year of college.

With the Toronto Blue Jays, he played first with the Medicine Hat Blue Jays in 2001, the Dunedin Blue Jays in 2002, the New Haven Ravens in 2003, the New Hampshire Fisher Cats in both 2004 and 2005 before moving to the Washington Nationals organization where he pitched briefly with the Potomac Nationals and Harrisburg Senators in 2005.

He was with Canada in the qualifiers for the 2004 Summer Olympics, as they locked up one of two American spots (alongside Cuba) in Athens, which finished in fourth place.

Following his professional playing days, Ogiltree returned to Canada to play in the Intercounty Baseball League (IBL), playing with the Brantford Red Sox from 2006 to 2009.

Prior to going pro, he also spent some time in the IBL, playing with the Guelph Royals from 1997 to 2000.

Overall, he finished his minor league career with a record of 19–19 with 39 saves and a 3.62 ERA.
