= Kevin Carroll (basketball) =

American basketball coach

Current position
- Title: Head coach
- Team: Lipscomb
- Conference: Atlantic Sun
- Record: 22–16 (.579)

Playing career
- 1996–2000: Berry

Coaching career (HC unless noted)
- 2003–2006: St. Pius X High School
- 2006–2007: Alabama–Huntsville (assistant)
- 2007–2010: Air Force (assistant)
- 2010–2017: Maryville
- 2017–2019: VMI (assistant)
- 2019–2023: Lipscomb (assistant)
- 2023–2025: Trevecca
- 2025–present: Lipscomb

Head coaching record
- Overall: 144–151 (.488)

Kevin Carroll is an American basketball coach. He is currently the head coach of the Lipscomb Bisons men's basketball team.

== Career ==
Caroll played college basketball at Berry College. He earned a master's degree from the University of Alabama in 2002, before accepting his first coaching position as head coach of the St. Pius X Catholic High School boys' basketball team. In 2006, he moved to the collegiate ranks, serving as an assistant coach for Alabama–Huntsville and Air Force, before becoming the head coach at Maryville. After spending seven seasons as Maryville's head coach, Carroll served as an assistant coach at VMI and Lipscomb. In 2023, he was named the head coach at Trevecca Nazarene. In two seasons as the Trojans head coach, Carroll amassed a 35–23 record.

On April 15, 2025, Carroll was named the next head coach at Lipscomb, replacing Lennie Acuff.

== Head coaching record ==
Record table
Season	Team	Overall	Conference	Standing	Postseason
Maryville (Great Lakes Valley Conference) (2010–2017)
2010–11	Maryville	7–19	3–15	5th (West)	
2011–12	Maryville	13–14	6–12	5th (West)	
2012–13	Maryville	23–9	12–6	2nd (West)	
2013–14	Maryville	13–14	7–11	6th (West)	
2014–15	Maryville	12–17	6–12	6th (West)	
2015–16	Maryville	10–18	4–14	7th (West)	
2016–17	Maryville	9–21	3–15	8th (West)	
Maryville:		87–112 (.437)	41–85 (.325)		
Trevecca Nazarene (Great Midwest Athletic Conference) (2023–2024)
2023–24	Trevecca Nazarene	16–13	11–9	7th	
Trevecca Nazarene (Gulf South Conference) (2024–2025)
2024–25	Trevecca Nazarene	19–10	14–8	4th	
Trevecca Nazarene:		35–23 (.603)	25–17 (.595)		
Lipscomb (Atlantic Sun) (2025–present)
2025–26	Lipscomb	19–13	12–6	4th	
2026–27	Lipscomb	3–3	0–0		
Lipscomb:		22–16 (.579)	12–6 (.667)		
Total:		144–151 (.488)			
National champion Postseason invitational champion Conference regular season champion Conference regular season and conference tournament champion Division regular season champion Division regular season and conference tournament champion Conference tournament champion
