= Victory University =

Defunct American for-profit college

Coordinates: 35.139046°N 89.945927°W

Crichton College
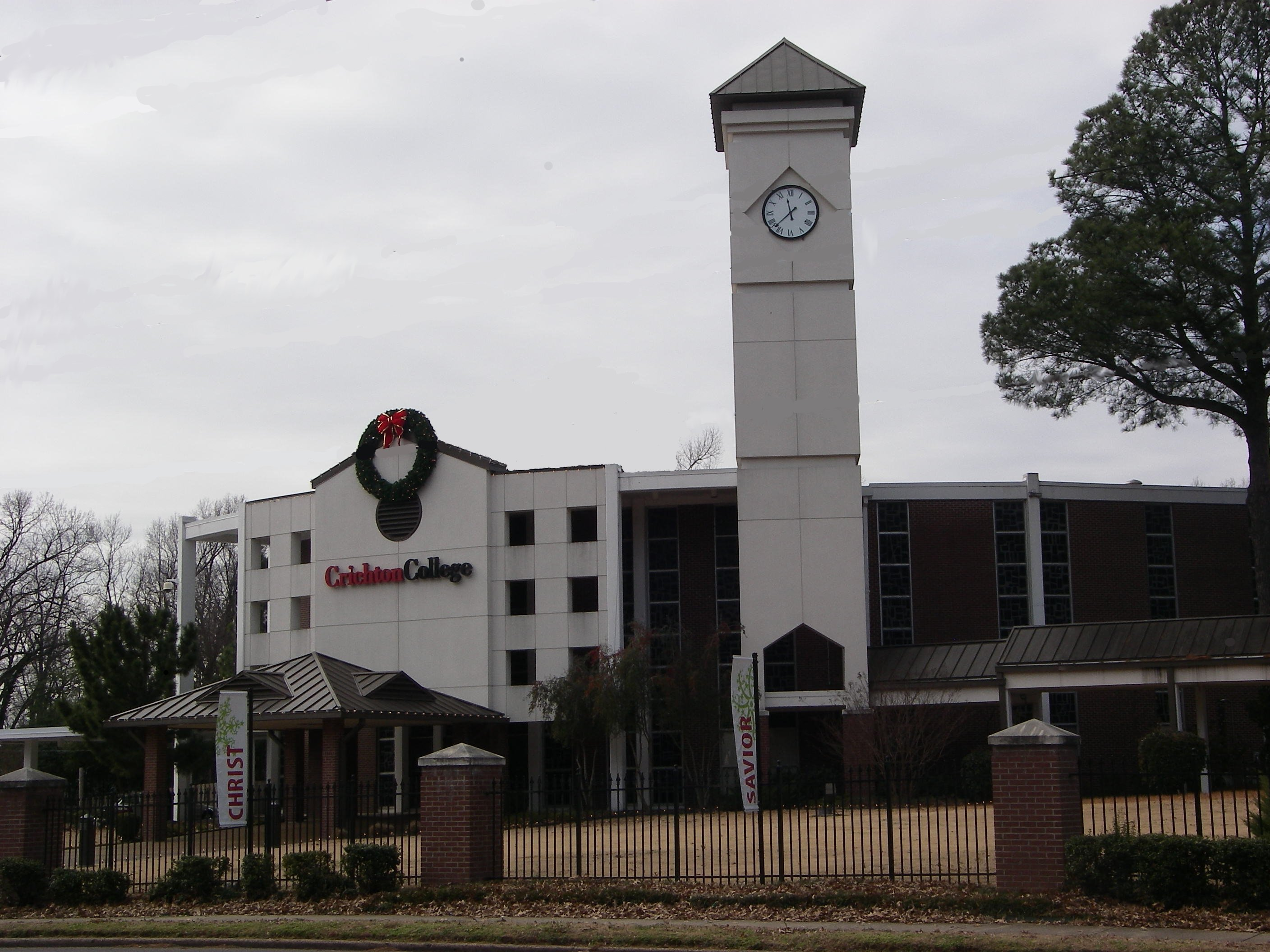
- Motto: Think Critically. Grow Spiritually. Change Our World.
- Type: Private for-profit university
- Active: 1941–2014
- Religious affiliation: Nondenominational Christian
- Chancellor: Mike Huckabee
- President: Shirley Robinson Pippins
- Provost: Sherryl Weems
- Faculty: 95
- Students: 1,970
- Location: Memphis, Tennessee, U.S.
- Campus: Urban, 25 acres (10 ha)
- Colors: Crimson & cardinal

Victory University, formerly Crichton College, was a private for-profit university in Memphis, Tennessee. It closed in May 2014 and was owned by California-based Significant Education. Victory University was accredited by the Southern Association of Colleges and Schools (SACS) and offered on-campus and distance learning courses.

== History ==
Victory University was founded as the Mid-South Bible Center in 1944. Shortly after, the institution became the Mid-South Bible Institute with a non-credit Adult Education Program and a one-year Basic Bible Course.

In 1958, a four-year Bible college program was initiated and in 1960, the institution changed its name to Mid-South Bible College. In 1971, the institution earned accreditation from the Association of Biblical Higher Education. The institution continued to grow and in 1982, it began a Teacher Education program to "prepare Christian men and women to teach in schools." In 1986, with the addition of majors in the social and natural sciences, education, and music, the institution gained accreditation from the Southern Association of Colleges and Schools.

In 1987, the institution changed its name to Crichton College to honor its long-time president James B. Crichton, who died in 1984. The institution relocated twice: in 1989, sharing a campus with local megachurch Central Church and again in March 2002, moving to its final location on Highland Avenue.

During 2009, Dr. John M. Borek Jr. was appointed president and California-based Significant Federation bought the financially troubled institution, which became a for-profit business. One year later, the college changed its name to Victory University. Former Arkansas Governor Mike Huckabee was given the title of Chancellor and became a fundraiser for the institution, although Huckabee did not take up residence in Memphis. The financial troubles continued to plague the university and it abruptly announced in March 2014 that the spring semester of 2014 would be its last semester and the university would be closing.

== Academics ==
Victory University offered doctoral degrees e.g. DBA (Doctor of Business Administration), MBA (Master of Business Administration), Master's degrees, Bachelor of Arts (B.A.) and Bachelor of Science (B.S.) in a range of disciplines and interdisciplinary studies. An Associate of Science in Christian Ministry was the only two-year degree offered. It also offered certificate programs in teacher education, biblical studies and urban youth ministries. Starting in the fall of 2011 VU offered a Masters in Professional Counseling.

Victory University had a program called the "Bridge to College", which was a dual enrollment program for high school students.

== Student life ==
Victory University offered activities and entertainment for students at the Bryce Student Center. Seminars and conferences on career planning, maintaining a successful family life, and Christian missions were part of the college's annual program. Victory University leased a dormatory for up to 120 students at the Flats at Cotton Council, located four miles away from the main campus at 1918 North Parkway in Midtown Memphis. The upper three levels of the dormitory were reserved for athletes.

== Athletics ==
At the time of the school's closure, Victory (VU) athletic teams were called the Eagles. The university was a member of the National Christian College Athletic Association (NCCAA), primarily competing as an independent in the Mid-East Region of the Division I level, which they also competed as a member until after the 2004–05 school year; as well as a member of the United States Collegiate Athletic Association (USCAA), primarily competing as an independent; both from 2010–11 to 2013–14. The Eagles previously competed in the TranSouth Athletic Conference (TranSouth or TSAC) of the National Association of Intercollegiate Athletics (NAIA) from 2005–06 to 2008–09.

Victory competed in ten intercollegiate varsity sports: Men's sports included baseball, basketball, bowling cross country and track & field; while women's sports included bowling, cross country, track & field and volleyball; and co-ed sports included spirit squad.

=== Nickname ===
Prior to 1985, VU varsity teams were known as the Saints, from 1985 to 1989 as the Crusaders, from 1989 through 1996, as the Cougars, in 1996, as the Cardinals, in 2005 as the Comets, and in 2011 as the Eagles.

=== History ===
Before the 2009–10 school year began, Crichton left the NAIA. Intercollegiate athletic programs were suspended in the spring of 2009 because of the institution's financial troubles, but were re-instated, beginning with men's and women's basketball in April 2010. The Eagles returned to intercollegiate athletic competition by re-joining back to the NCCAA as well as joining the United States Collegiate Athletic Association (USCAA), effective in the 2010–11 school year. In 2012 Victory University offered men and women's bowling, men and women's track and field, men and women's cross country, and women's volleyball.

== Notable alumnus ==
- Michael Pearl, Author of To Train Up a Child
