= Lipscomb Bisons men's basketball =

College basketball team

2025–26 Lipscomb Bisons men's basketball team
- University: Lipscomb University
- Head coach: Kevin Carroll (1st season)
- Location: Nashville, Tennessee
- Arena: Allen Arena (capacity: 5,028)
- Conference: Atlantic Sun Conference
- Nickname: Bisons
- Colors: Purple and gold

NCAA Division I tournament appearances
- 2018, 2025

NAIA tournament champions
- 1986
Other NAIA tournament results
Semifinals	1986, 1990, 1996
Quarterfinals	1986, 1990, 1991, 1993, 1996, 2000
Appearances	1982, 1985, 1986, 1988, 1990, 1991, 1992, 1993, 1994, 1995, 1996, 1997, 1999, 2000

Conference tournament champions
- 2018, 2025

Conference regular-season champions
- 2006, 2010, 2019, 2025

Uniforms
Home	Away	Alternate

The Lipscomb Bisons men's basketball team is the men's basketball team that represents Lipscomb University in Nashville, Tennessee, United States in NCAA Division I. The school's team currently competes in the ASUN Conference. Previously, the Bisons played men's basketball in NCAA Division II and the National Association of Intercollegiate Athletics. The Bisons have appeared two times in the NCAA Division I men's basketball tournament, most recently in 2025 after defeating North Alabama in the ASUN championship. In 2019, Lipscomb made history by becoming the first team in ASUN history to make it to the National Invitation Tournament Final.

== History ==
Lipscomb has a 311–280 all-time record in NCAA basketball and a 186–141 record in ASUN games. Lipscomb won their first ASUN men's basketball tournament title in 2018, despite winning the regular-season conference title twice before, in 2006 and 2010. The Bisons made the NCAA tournament for the first time in 2018. They have competed in the NIT twice, in 2006 and 2019. Lipscomb is also home to the top two all-time leading college basketball scorers, John Pierce and Philip Hutcheson. Lipscomb also won the NAIA National championship in 1986.

== Battle of the Boulevard ==
Lipscomb maintains a rivalry with nearby Belmont University, and the two men's basketball teams compete annually in a game known as the Battle of the Boulevard. The game is named for Belmont Boulevard, on which both schools are located. The 2 miles (3.2 km) separating the schools makes them among the closest rivals in NCAA Division I men's basketball. The rivalry began in 1953, when both schools played in the NAIA, and continued into the NCAA when both schools transitioned to Division I in the 1990s. Lipscomb leads the all-time series 73–61, while Belmont leads 14–9 in NCAA play.

== Postseason ==
=== NCAA tournament results ===
The Bisons have appeared in two NCAA tournaments. Their combined record is 0–2.

Year	Seed	Round	Opponent	Result
2018	#15	First Round	North Carolina	L 66–84
2025	#14	First Round	Iowa State	L 55–82

=== NIT results ===
The Bisons have appeared in two National Invitation Tournaments (NITs). Their record is 4–2. They were the runner up in 2019.

Year	Seed	Round	Opponent	Result
2006	#10	Opening Round	UTEP	L 66–85
2019	#5	First Round; Second Round; Quarterfinals; Semifinals; Final	Davidson; UNC Greensboro; NC State; Wichita State; Texas	W 89–81; W 86–69; W 94–93; W 71–64; L 66–81

=== NAIA tournament results ===
The Bison have appeared in the NAIA Tournament 14 times. Their combined record is 21–13. They were NAIA National Champions in 1986.

Year	Seed	Round	Opponent	Result
1982	#5	First Round	#28 Kearney State	L 87–92
1985	#17	First Round; Second Round	#16 William Carey #1 Fort Hayes State	W 68–66; L 48–55
1986	#11	First Round; Second Round; Quarterfinals; Semifinals; National Championship	#22 Minnesota–Duluth #6 Emporia State #14 Central Washington #7 Saint Thomas Aquinas #25 Arkansas–Monticello	W 62–56; W 79–76; W 80–64; W 102–91; W 67–54
1988	#3	First Round; Second Round	#30 East Texas Baptist #14 College of Idaho	W 89–63; L 108–123
1990	#1	First Round; Second Round; Quarterfinals; Semifinals	#32 Midland Lutheran #17 Central Arkansas #24 Pfeiffer #4 Birmingham–Southern	W 92–73; W 70–66; W 125–83; L 96–98
1991	#3	First Round; Second Round; Quarterfinals	#30 Holy Family #14 Briar Cliff #6 Pfeiffer	W 106–75; W 89–87; L 95–105
1992	#11	First Round; Second Round	#22 Findlay #6 BYU–Hawaiʻi	W 67–66; L 66–90
1993	#4	First Round; Second Round; Quarterfinals	#29 McKendree #13 Life #21 Georgetown (KY)	W 87–72; W 94–89; L 91–101
1994	#12	First Round	#21 Saint Mary's (TX)	L 62–77
1995	#18	First Round; Second Round	#15 Oklahoma Baptist #31 Montana State–Northern	W 74–63; L 78–92
1996	#4	First Round; Second Round; Quarterfinals; Semifinals	#29 Talladega #20 McKendree #21 East Central #1 Georgetown (KY)	W 91–78; W 95–87; W 93–75; L 84–97
1997	#7	First Round	#26 Point Park	L 100–111
1999	#17	First Round	#16 Biola	L 46–51
2000	#2	First Round; Second Round; Quarterfinals	#31 Saint Gregory's #15 Central State #10 Biola	W 77–66; W 77–41; L 71–82

== Notable alumni ==
- Gary Colson, college basketball coach
- Adnan Hodžić, professional basketball player
- Garrison Mathews, NBA player
- John Pierce, college basketball all-time/all-division scoring leader with 4,230 points
- Marvin Williams, professional basketball player
