= Freed–Hardeman University =

Private university in Henderson, Tennessee, U.S.

Coordinates: 35.43844°N 88.63864°W

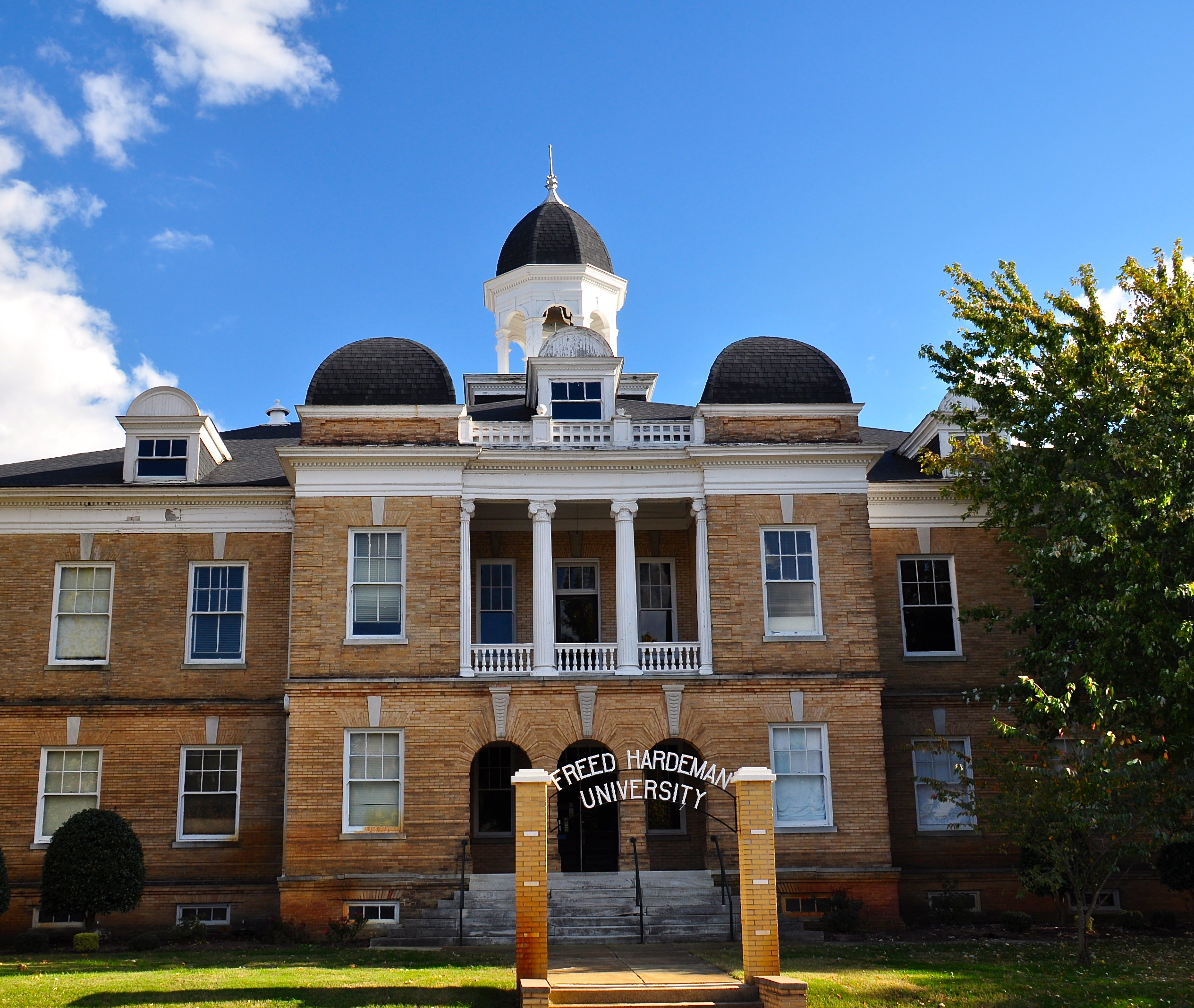
- The National Teacher's Normal and Business College Administration Building, listed on the National Register of Historic Places
- Former names: Henderson Male Institute (1869–1907); National Teachers' Normal and Business College (1907–1919); Freed–Hardeman College (1919–1990)
- Motto: How to Live and Make a Living
- Type: Private university
- Established: 1869; 157 years ago
- Religious affiliation: Churches of Christ
- Endowment: $96.2 million (2025)
- President: Keith Harris
- Students: 2,283
- Undergraduates: 1,850
- Postgraduates: 433
- Location: Henderson, Tennessee, United States
- Campus: 96 acres (39 ha); Rural
- Colors: Maroon and gold
- Nickname: Lions
- Sporting affiliations: NAIA – Mid-South
- Website: fhu.edu

Freed–Hardeman University is a private university associated with the Churches of Christ and located in Henderson, Tennessee, United States. It is primarily undergraduate and residential. The university also serves some commuting, part-time and adult students on-campus and through distance-learning programs.

The university is governed by a board of trustees, all of whom are required to be members of Churches of Christ. Courses are offered by 12 academic departments in 5 colleges: Arts and Sciences, Biblical Studies, Business, Education and Behavioral Sciences, and the Honors College.

== History ==
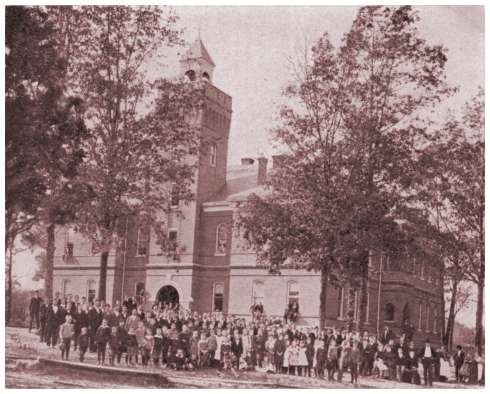
Georgie Robertson College, 1904

Freed–Hardeman traces its origin to the 1869 charter of a private high school and college for Henderson, the "Henderson Male Institute". It was known at various times as the "Henderson Masonic Male and Female Institute", "West Tennessee Christian College", or "Georgie Robertson Christian College". It was named Georgie Robertson Christian College after George Ann "Georgie" Robertson.

In the 1907 spring term Georgie Robertson Christian College closed. N. B. Hardeman, a Georgie Robertson Christian College alumnus, and A. G. Freed worked together to establish a new institution, the "National Teachers' Normal and Business College" to fill the educational void created in Henderson by the closing. The NTNBC was incorporated on May 21, 1907, but classes did not start until the fall of 1908. In 1919, it was renamed "Freed–Hardeman College in honor of its founders. In February 1990, it became Freed–Hardeman University.

In 1950, the student body went on strike in response to the alleged abuse of two students by N. B. Hardeman. After the third day of the strike, Hardeman agreed to step down in response to student demands as soon as his successor was able to take control of the college.

The college did not accept African-American students until 1964, when its president, Hubert A. Dixon, stated that black students would be admitted in response "to the mistake of accepting federal funds". The first black graduate was Elizabeth Saunders in 1967.

The university offers courses outside of the Henderson area in Memphis, Tennessee. It also offers European study abroad programs based at the FHU facility in Verviers, Belgium. Other opportunities include programs in Spain, Israel, Costa Rica, New York City, Canada, and Seoul.

The university was granted an exception to Title IX in 2016 allowing discrimination on the basis of sexual orientation and gender identity where conflict exists with religious tenets.

During the 2019–2020 academic year, the university celebrated its 150th anniversary and a volume of university history, By the Grace of God: The Story of Freed–Hardeman University, was published.

== Campus buildings ==
Dryden Auditorium is the main auditorium on campus and is used for Daily Chapel, FHU Lectureships, sports banquets, and the annual Homecoming Play.

The Hope Barber Shull Academic Resource Center, opened in 2016, houses the Loden-Daniel Library, a café, and other resources.

Opposite Old Main is Crews Colbert Activity Center. It has two theaters, "Maroon Theater" and "Gold Theater", and a large activity room used for activities and meetings.

== Student life ==
Freed–Hardeman does not have fraternities and sororities in the traditional sense. Instead, the university has co-educational social clubs. These are local only to Freed–Hardeman and have no connection to any national Greek system. Students participate in intramural sports, club meetings and devotionals with their respective clubs.

== Rankings ==
U.S. News & World Report included the university in its affordability ranking ("Great Schools, Great Prices"), listing it 13th among Southern master's degree-granting universities. The university reported a 44% acceptance rate of applicants for the fall 2012 semester.

The university is ranked among the "Absolute Worst Campuses for LGBTQ Youth" by Campus Pride.

== Athletics ==
The Freed–Hardeman sports teams are called the "Lions" and "Lady Lions". The university is a member of the National Association of Intercollegiate Athletics (NAIA), primarily competing in the Mid-South Conference (MSC) since the 2020–21 academic year. The Lions and Lady Lions previously competed in the American Midwest Conference from 2013–14 to 2019–20, in the TranSouth Athletic Conference (TranSouth or TSAC) from 1996–97 to 2012–13 and in the Tennessee Collegiate Athletic Conference (TCAC) from 1986–87 to 1995–96.

Freed–Hardeman competes in 16 intercollegiate varsity sports. Men's sports include baseball, basketball, cross country, golf, soccer, tennis and track & field. Women's sports include basketball, cheerleading, cross country, golf, soccer, softball, tennis, track & field and volleyball.

In 2014, the men's basketball coach, Jason Shelton, was awarded the Don Meyer Award, presented annually to the top NAIA coach in college basketball. In 2024 and 2026, the men's basketball team won the NAIA National Championship.

On 20 March 2018, the Lady Lions basketball team won its first NAIA National Championship.

== Notable alumni and faculty ==
- Grace Alonso de Armiño, Spanish professional basketball player, 3x3 Olympian
- Carl Bell, musician
- George S. Benson, university administrator
- John Brown, businessman
- T. Jeff Busby, politician
- John DeBerry, minister and politician
- Todd Farmer, screenwriter and actor
- Kerby Farrell, baseball player
- Dorsey B. Hardeman, politician
- Jere Hargrove, politician
- Hugo McCord, Bible scholar
- Dianne Odell, iron lung survivor
- Charles P. Roland, historian
- Rubel Shelly, author and college administrator
- Thomas B. Warren, theologian
- Sue Shelton White, suffragist lawyer
