= Mid-Continent University =

Defunct private university near Mayfield, Kentucky

- Former names: West Kentucky Baptist Bible Institute, Baptist Bible Institute, Mid-Continent Baptist Bible College, Mid-Continent College
- Motto: Building Effective Leaders
- Type: Private, Baptist
- Active: 1949–2014
- Affiliations: Southern Baptist Convention
- Location: Mayfield, Kentucky, US; 36.8148°N 88.6483°W
- Colors: Navy █ and Gold █
- Nickname: Cougars
- Website: http://www.midcontinent.edu

Mid-Continent University was a four-year, liberal arts Christian institution located near Mayfield, Kentucky, United States. It had been experiencing financial troubles and was placed on "warning status" by its regional accreditor the Southern Association of Colleges and Schools in late 2013. On April 15, 2014, university officials reported that Interim President Ken Winters stepped down for family reasons April 12, and that former President Robert Imhoff and his wife Jackie Imhoff, the vice president of adult services, who had stepped down from their positions in February but were still receiving a salary, were fired. Robert Thomas "Tom" Walden was named to replace Winters. On April 16, it was announced that the university did not have enough money to pay staff, and would close at the end of June. On October 6, 2014, it was announced that Mid-Continent University had filed for bankruptcy.

== History ==
The university opened as the West Kentucky Baptist Institution in January 1949 in Clinton, Kentucky. In 1957, the university moved to Mayfield and changed its name to Bible Baptist Institute. In June 1965, the board of trustees changed the name of the school to Mid-Continent Baptist Bible College. In 1972, the Harris family of Graves County donated approximately 100 acres to the college and construction began on this campus. By 1992, LaVerne Butler, then-president of the university facilitated the school's accreditation. He retired in 1997. On May 20, 1993, the board of trustees changed the name to Mid-Continent College, and after organizing into two separate colleges, changed the name to Mid-Continent University.

In December 2013, the school's accreditation warning by the Southern Association of Colleges and Schools was extended for a second year. This in turn triggered the denial of Federal financial aid from the United States Department of Education and put the school in financial difficulty.

On April 16, 2014, all remaining employees were laid off although plans were for the school to remain open and staffed with volunteers until after graduation. Every class with at least one student graduating in May was covered by volunteers.

On April 18, 2014, Western Kentucky University developed a special offer to accept all credits and waive application fees as well as other special incentives to ease the transition for Mid-Continent students. On April 19, Midway College made a similar announcement. Shortly afterwards, the school announced teach-out agreements with Murray State University, University of the Cumberlands and Campbellsville University.

== Academics ==
The university offered three bachelor's degrees: (Bachelor of Arts, Bachelor of Science, and bachelor of ministry) and two associate's degrees: (associate of arts and associate of science).

On April 15, 2014, Mid-Continent's board of directors voted to cease operations and instruction, effective June 30, 2014. All faculty and staff were dismissed, with the exception of a few faculty members that agreed to volunteer their services without pay until the end of the semester, in order to accommodate graduating seniors.

== Athletics ==
The Mid-Continent athletic teams were called the Cougars. The university was a member of the National Association of Intercollegiate Athletics (NAIA), primarily competing in the American Midwest Conference (AMC) during the 2013–14 academic year. They were also a member of the National Christian College Athletic Association (NCCAA), primarily competing as an independent in the Mid-East Region of the Division I level. The Cougars previously competed in the TranSouth Athletic Conference (TranSouth or TSAC) from 2006–07 to 2012–13; and in the Kentucky Intercollegiate Athletic Conference (KIAC; now currently known as the River States Conference (RSC) since the 2016–17 school year) from 2000–01 to 2005–06.

Mid-Continent competed in seven intercollegiate varsity sports: Men's sports included baseball, basketball and soccer; while women's sports included basketball, softball and volleyball; and co-ed sports included spirit squad.
