= Southwestern Christian University =

University in Bethany, Oklahoma, U.S.

Coordinates: 35°30′46″N 97°38′29″W

- Former names: Southwestern Bible College (1946–1981); Southwestern College of Christian Ministries (1981–2001)
- Type: Private university
- Established: 1946
- Religious affiliation: International Pentecostal Holiness Church
- President: Tom Murray
- Students: 850 (Fall 2013)
- Location: Bethany, Oklahoma, U.S.
- Colors: Blue & White
- Nickname: Eagles
- Sporting affiliations: NAIA – Sooner; NCCAA Division I – Central
- Website: www.swcu.edu
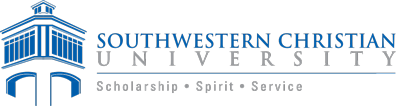

Southwestern Christian University is a private Pentecostal university in Bethany, Oklahoma. It was founded in 1946 as Southwestern Bible College in Oklahoma City, Oklahoma, and was the first Pentecostal educational institution in the state. While it was established as a Bible college for the training of Christian church leaders within the International Pentecostal Holiness Church, the denomination planned to quickly expand the school into a junior college.

== History ==
By the 1960s the college had developed a junior college program (becoming accredited in 1964) and was able to open its doors to an expanding student body. During this time it began a steady growth as one of the largest junior colleges in the country and the largest within the Pentecostal Holiness Church. These broad changes resulted in various buildings being built (Light Library, Irwin Learning Center, Mabee Science Center, and the Mash Loflin Field House) and degree offerings saw the name shifting to Oklahoma City Southwestern College (OCSC) to better reflect the scope of the expanded school.

However, in 1981 the governing body of the denomination decided to re-focus the goals of the institution. The International Pentecostal Holiness Church ended the school's junior college plan and scaled back the institution to an abbreviated form of its original design. As a result, it became a Ministry training college. In addition to this they moved to the Oklahoma City suburb of Bethany, Oklahoma. At this time the name changed from Southwestern Bible College to Southwestern College of Christian Ministries (SCCM).

In 1998, in response to changing needs, the school implemented a five-year program to change its direction. A Master of Ministry graduate program was developed and added in this time period. As a result of these combined changes, in 2001 the school, Southwestern Christian University, was granted a name change by the North Central accrediting body. An integral part of Oklahoma City history for over half a century, SCU developed beyond the parameters of just a Bible college to become a full Christian liberal arts university.

== Accreditation and approval ==
SCU is accredited by the Higher Learning Commission and approved by the Oklahoma State Regents for Higher Education. It is also approved by the General Department of Church Education Ministries of the International Pentecostal Holiness Church for training ministers, missionaries, and Christian workers and the Association of Christian Schools International (ACSI) to offer Bible and theology courses for teacher certification for Christian day schools.

== Athletics ==
The Southwestern Christian athletic teams are called the Eagles. The university is a member of the National Association of Intercollegiate Athletics (NAIA), primarily competing in the Sooner Athletic Conference (SAC) since the 2013–14 academic year. They are also a member of the National Christian College Athletic Association (NCCAA), primarily competing as an independent in the Central Region of the Division I level. The Eagles previously competed in the defunct Midlands Collegiate Athletic Conference (MCAC) from 2010–11 to 2012–13.

Southwestern Christian competes in 13 intercollegiate varsity sports: Men's sports include basketball, cross country, golf, soccer, baseball and track & field; while women's sports include basketball, cross country, golf, soccer, softball, track & field and volleyball; and co-ed sports include archery and cheerleading. Former sports include men's & women's bowling and men's & women's tennis.

In 2014, basketball player Tyler Inman won the NAIA Men's Basketball Dunk Contest and was drafted by the Harlem Globetrotters.

In 2015, disgraced basketball coach Dave Bliss was hired as the head coach at NAIA-member school Southwestern Christian University. Bliss resigned from Southwestern Christian on April 3, 2017, following the airing of the Showtime documentary Disgraced, which chronicled the cover-up at Baylor University.
