= American Midwest Conference =

College athletic conference

- Formerly: Show-Me Conference (1986–1994)
- Association: NAIA
- Founded: 1986; 40 years ago
- Commissioner: Will Wolper
- Sports fielded: 17; men's: 8; women's: 9
- No. of teams: 10
- Headquarters: St. Louis, Missouri
- Region: Midwest and South
- Website: amcsportsonline.com

Locations
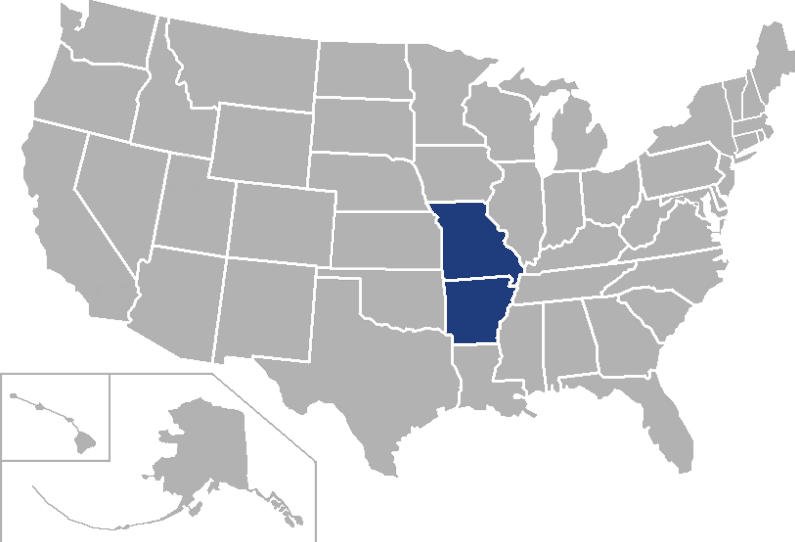

The American Midwest Conference (AMC) is a college athletic conference affiliated with the National Association of Intercollegiate Athletics (NAIA) with 10 member institutions located in Arkansas and Missouri in the United States.

== History ==
American Midwest Conference
Location of AMC members: current, departing, future

The conference began as the Show-Me Conference in 1986, then changed to its current name in 1994, reflecting that its footprint had expanded beyond Missouri.

=== Recent events ===
On August 22, 2022, Lyon College announced that it would leave the American Midwest and the NAIA to join the NCAA Division III ranks and the St. Louis Intercollegiate Athletic Conference (SLIAC) at the end of the 2022–23 academic year.

=== Chronological timeline ===
- 1986 – The American Midwest Conference was founded as the Show-Me Conference. Charter members included Columbia College of Missouri, Hannibal–LaGrange College (now Hannibal–LaGrange University), Harris-Stowe State College (now Harris-Stowe State University), Missouri Baptist College (now Missouri Baptist University) and Park College (now Park University), beginning the 1986–87 academic year.
- 1987 – McKendree College (now McKendree University) joined the Show-Me in the 1987–88 academic year.
- 1990 – Fontbonne left the Show-Me and the NAIA to fully align with the Division III ranks of the National Collegiate Athletic Association (NCAA) and the St. Louis Intercollegiate Athletic Conference (SLIAC) after the 1989–90 academic year.
- 1993 – Iowa Wesleyan College (later Iowa Wesleyan University), Lindenwood College (now Lindenwood University) and William Woods College (now William Woods University) joined the Show-Me in the 1993–94 academic year.
- 1994:
  - Park left the Show-Me to join the Midlands Collegiate Athletic Conference (MCAC) for most sports, while its men's basketball team had become an NAIA Independent after the 1993–94 academic year.
  - The Show-Me Conference was rebranded as the American Midwest Conference in the 1994–95 academic year.
- 1995 – Iowa Wesleyan left the American Midwest to join the Midwest Classic Conference (MCC) after the 1994–95 academic year.
- 1996 – Lindenwood left the American Midwest to join the Heart of America Athletic Conference (HAAC) after the 1995–96 academic year.
- 2001 – Williams Baptist College (now Williams Baptist University) joined the American Midwest in the 2001–02 academic year.
- 2003 – The University of Illinois at Springfield (UIS) joined the American Midwest in the 2003–04 academic year.
- 2008 – Stephens College joined the American Midwest in the 2008–09 academic year.
- 2009:
  - Illinois–Springfield (UIS) left the American Midwest and the NAIA to join the NCAA Division II ranks and the Great Lakes Valley Conference (GLVC) after the 2008–09 academic year.
    - Park rejoined the American Midwest in the 2009–10 academic year.
- 2011:
  - McKendree left the American Midwest and the NAIA to join the NCAA Division II ranks as an NCAA D-II Independent (which would later join the GLVC beginning the 2012–13 academic year) after the 2010–11 academic year.
  - Benedictine University at Springfield joined the American Midwest in the 2011–12 academic year.
- 2012 – Lyon College joined the American Midwest in the 2012–13 academic year.
- 2013 – Freed–Hardeman University and Mid-Continent University joined the American Midwest in the 2013–14 academic year.
- 2014:
  - Mid-Continent left the American Midwest after spending one season, as the school ceased operations after the 2013–14 academic year.
  - Lindenwood University at Belleville and the St. Louis College of Pharmacy (now the University of Health Sciences and Pharmacy in St. Louis, a.k.a. UHSP) joined the American Midwest in the 2014–15 academic year.
- 2015:
  - Benedictine–Springfield left the American Midwest, as the school ceased operations after the 2014–15 academic year.
  - Central Baptist College joined the American Midwest in the 2015–16 academic year.
- 2017 – Calumet College of St. Joseph and Marian University joined the American Midwest as associate members for men's wrestling in the 2017–18 academic year.
- 2019 – Lincoln College of Illinois joined the American Midwest as an associate member for men's wrestling in the 2019–20 academic year.
- 2020:
  - Three institutions left the American Midwest to join their respective new home primary conferences, all effective after the 2019–20 academic year:
    - Freed–Hardeman to join the Mid-South Conference
    - Lindenwood–Belleville to cease operations
    - and Park to join the Heart of America Athletic Conference (HAAC)
  - Marian (Ind.) left the American Midwest as an associate member for men's wrestling after the 2019–20 academic year.
- 2022:
  - Lincoln (Ill.) left the American Midwest as an associate member for men's wrestling as the school announced that it would close after the 2021–22 academic year.
  - Cottey College joined the American Midwest from the AII/Continental ranks in the 2022–23 academic year.
- 2023:
  - Lyon left the American Midwest and the NAIA to join the NCAA Division III ranks and the SLIAC after the 2022–23 academic year.
  - Haskell Indian Nations University joined the American Midwest as an associate member for men's and women's indoor and outdoor track & field in the 2023–24 academic year.
- 2024:
  - Mission University (formerly Baptist Bible College) and Crowley's Ridge College both joined the American Midwest in the 2024–25 academic year.
  - Four institutions joined the American Midwest as associate members, all effective in the 2024–25 academic year:
    - St. Ambrose University for competitive cheer and dance
    - Dickinson State University for only competitive cheer
    - and the University of St. Francis and Viterbo University for only competitive dance
- 2025:
  - Missouri Baptist and William Woods left the American Midwest to join the HAAC after the 2024–25 academic year.
  - Four institutions joined the American Midwest as associate members, all effective in the 2025–26 academic year:
    - Oklahoma City University and Saint Xavier University for competitive cheer and dance
    - Langston University for only competitive cheer
    - and Bismarck State College for only competitive dance
- 2026 – St. Ambrose left the American Midwest as an associate member for competitive cheer and dance to join the HAAC as a full member after the 2025–26 academic year.
- 2027:
  - UHSP will leave the American Midwest after the 2026–27 academic year; as the school will merge with Washington University in St. Louis and drop its athletics program.
  - Champion Christian College will join the American Midwest, beginning the 2027–28 academic year.

== Member schools ==
=== Current members ===
The American Midwest currently has ten full members, all but one are private schools.

Institution	Location	Founded	Affiliation	Enrollment	Nickname	Joined (Note: Represents the calendar year when fall sports competition begins.)
Central Baptist College	Conway, Arkansas	1952	Baptist Missionary	547	Mustangs	2015
Columbia College	Columbia, Missouri	1851	Disciples of Christ	5,689	Cougars	1986
Cottey College (Note: This institution is a women's college, therefore it does not field men's sports.)	Nevada, Missouri	1884	Nonsectarian	254	Comets	2022
Crowley's Ridge College	Paragould, Arkansas	1964	Churches of Christ	241	Pioneers	2024
Hannibal–LaGrange University	Hannibal, Missouri	1858	Southern Baptist	499	Trojans	1986
Harris–Stowe State University	St. Louis, Missouri	1857	Public (Note: Also a historically black college and university.)	1,002	Hornets	1986
Mission University (Note: Formerly known as Baptist Bible College until 2024.)	Springfield, Missouri	1950	BBFI	434	Patriots	2024
Stephens College	Columbia, Missouri	1833	Nonsectarian	568	Stars	2008
University of Health Sciences and Pharmacy in St. Louis (UHSP)	St. Louis, Missouri	1864	Nonsectarian	648	Eutectics	2014
Williams Baptist University	Walnut Ridge, Arkansas	1941	Southern Baptist	517	Eagles & Lady Eagles	2001

=== Future members ===
The American Midwest will have one future full member, which will be also a private school.

Institution	Location	Founded	Affiliation	Enrollment	Nickname	Joining (Note: Represents the calendar year when fall sports competition begins.)	Current conference
Champion Christian College	Hot Springs, Arkansas	2005	Nondenominational	146	Tigers	2027	NAIA Independent

=== Associate members ===
The American Midwest currently has nine associate members, four of which are public schools:

Institution	Location	Founded	Affiliation	Enrollment	Nickname	Joined (Note: Represents the calendar year when fall sports competition begins.)	AMC sport(s)	Primary conference
Bismarck State College	Bismarck, North Dakota	1939	Public (Note: Part of the North Dakota University System.)	4,206	Mystics	2025	Competitive dance	Frontier
Dickinson State University	Dickinson, North Dakota	1918	Public	1,410	Blue Hawks	2024	Competitive cheer	Frontier
Haskell Indian Nations University	Lawrence, Kansas	1884	Public tribal	978	Fighting Indians	2023	Men's indoor track & field	Continental (CAC)
Haskell Indian Nations University	Lawrence, Kansas	1884	Public tribal	978	Fighting Indians	2023	Men's outdoor track & field	Continental (CAC)
Haskell Indian Nations University	Lawrence, Kansas	1884	Public tribal	978	Fighting Indians	2023	Women's indoor track & field	Continental (CAC)
Haskell Indian Nations University	Lawrence, Kansas	1884	Public tribal	978	Fighting Indians	2023	Women's outdoor track & field	Continental (CAC)
Langston University	Langston, Oklahoma	1897	Public (Note: Also a historically black college and university.)	1,937	Lions	2025	Competitive cheer	Sooner (SAC)
Oklahoma City University	Oklahoma City, Oklahoma	1904	United; Methodist	2,966	Stars	2025	Competitive cheer	Sooner (SAC)
Oklahoma City University	Oklahoma City, Oklahoma	1904	United; Methodist	2,966	Stars	2025	Competitive dance	Sooner (SAC)
Saint Xavier University	Chicago, Illinois	1846	Catholic (R.S.M.)	3,485	Cougars	2025	Competitive cheer	Chicagoland (CCAC)
Saint Xavier University	Chicago, Illinois	1846	Catholic (R.S.M.)	3,485	Cougars	2025	Competitive dance	Chicagoland (CCAC)
University of St. Francis	Joliet, Illinois	1920	Catholic (Franciscans)	3,074	Fighting Saints	2024	Competitive dance	Chicagoland (CCAC)
Viterbo University	La Crosse, Wisconsin	1890	Catholic (Franciscan)	2,094	V-Hawks	2024	Competitive dance	Chicagoland (CCAC)

=== Former members ===
The American Midwest had thirteen former full members, all but one were private schools:

Institution	Location	Founded	Affiliation	Nickname	Joined (Note: Represents the calendar year when fall sports competition begins.)	Left (Note: Represents the calendar year when spring sports competition ends.)	Subsequent conference(s)	Current conference
Benedictine University at Springfield	Springfield, Illinois	1927	Catholic (Ursulines)	Bulldogs	2011 (Note: The Benedictine–Springfield men's and women's basketball teams joined the American Midwest a year after becoming a full member for other sports (2012–13).)	2015	Discontinued athletics	Closed in 2018
Fontbonne College (Note: Was known as Fontbonne University since 2002.)	Clayton, Missouri	1923	Catholic (C.S.J.)	Griffins	1986	1990	St. Louis (SLIAC) (Note: Currently an NCAA Division III athletic conference.) (1990–2025)	Closed in 2025
Freed–Hardeman University	Henderson, Tennessee	1869	Churches of Christ	Lions	2013	2020	Mid-South (MSC) (2020–present)	
University of Illinois at Springfield	Springfield, Illinois	1969	Public	Prairie Stars	2003	2009	Great Lakes Valley (GLVC) (Note: Currently an NCAA Division II athletic conference.) (2009–present)	
Iowa Wesleyan College (Note: Currently known as Iowa Wesleyan University since 2015.)	Mount Pleasant, Iowa	1842	United; Methodist	Tigers	1993	1995	various (Note: Iowa Wesleyan had joined the following subsequent conferences: the Midwest Collegiate Conference (MCC) from 1995–96 to 2011–12; as an NAIA Independent during the 2012–13 school year; the St. Louis Intercollegiate Athletic Conference (SLIAC) from 2013–14 to 2020–21; and the Continental Athletic Conference from 2021–22 to 2022–23.)	Closed in 2023 (Note: Iowa Wesleyan had announced a return to the AMC effective with the 2023–24 academic year, but closed at the end of the 2022–23 academic year.)
Lindenwood College (Note: Currently known as Lindenwood University since 1997.)	St. Charles, Missouri	1827	Presbyterian (PCUSA)	Lions	1993	1996	various (Note: Lindenwood had joined the following subsequent conferences: the Heart of America Athletic Conference (HAAC) from 1996–97 to 2010–11; as an NCAA D-II Independent during the 2011–12 school year; the Mid-America Intercollegiate Athletics Association (MIAA) from 2012–13 to 2018–19; and the Great Lakes Valley Conference (GLVC) from 2019–20 to 2021–22.)	Ohio Valley (OVC) (Note: Currently an NCAA Division I athletic conference.) (2022–present)
Lindenwood University at Belleville	Belleville, Illinois	2003	Presbyterian (PCUSA)	Lynx	2014	2020	Closed in 2020	
Lyon College	Batesville, Arkansas	1872	Presbyterian (PCUSA)	Scots	2012	2023	St. Louis (SLIAC) (2023–present)	
McKendree University	Lebanon, Illinois	1828	United; Methodist	Bearcats	1987	2011	NAIA/NCAA D-II Independent (2011–12)	Great Lakes Valley (GLVC) (2012–present)
Mid-Continent University	Mayfield, Kentucky	1949	Southern; Baptist	Cougars	2013	2014	Closed in 2014	
Missouri Baptist University	Creve Coeur, Missouri	1828	Southern; Baptist	Spartans	1986	2025	Heart of America (HAAC) (2025–present)	
Park University	Parkville, Missouri	1875	Nonsectarian	Pirates	1986	1994	Midlands (MCAC) (1994–2009)	Heart of America (HAAC) (2020–present)
Park University	Parkville, Missouri	1875	Nonsectarian	Pirates	2009	2020	Midlands (MCAC) (1994–2009)	Heart of America (HAAC) (2020–present)
William Woods University	Fulton, Missouri	1870	Disciples of Christ	Owls	1993	2025	Heart of America (HAAC) (2025–present)	

=== Former associate members ===
The American Midwest had three former associate members, all of which were private schools:

Institution	Location	Founded	Affiliation	Nickname	Joined (Note: Represents the calendar year when fall sports competition begins.)	Left (Note: Represents the calendar year when spring sports competition ends.)	AMC sport(s)	Primary conference
Calumet College of St. Joseph	Whiting, Indiana	1951	Catholic (C.PP.S.)	Crimson Wave	2017 (Note: Due to the COVID outbreaks, Calumet opted to not compete during the 2020–21 school year.)	2022	Men's wrestling	Chicagoland (CCAC)
Lincoln College	Lincoln, Illinois	1865	Nonsectarian	Lynx	2019	2022	Men's wrestling	Closed in 2022
Marian University	Indianapolis, Indiana	1851	Catholic (S.S.F.)	Knights	2017	2020	Men's wrestling	Crossroads
St. Ambrose University	Davenport, Iowa	1882	Catholic (Diocese of Davenport)	Fighting Bees	2024	2026	Competitive cheer	Heart of America (HAAC)
St. Ambrose University	Davenport, Iowa	1882	Catholic (Diocese of Davenport)	Fighting Bees	2024	2026	Competitive dance	Heart of America (HAAC)

=== Membership timeline ===
Full member (non-football) Associate member (sport)

== Sports ==
Conference sports
Sport	Men's	Women's
Baseball	✓	
Basketball	✓	✓
Cross Country	✓	✓
Golf	✓	✓
Soccer	✓	✓
Softball		✓
Track & Field Indoor	✓	✓
Track & Field Outdoor	✓	✓
Volleyball		✓
Wrestling	✓	
