= Arkansas Baptist State Convention =

Affiliated religious group of the Southern Baptist Convention

The Arkansas Baptist State Convention (ABSC) was founded on September 21, 1848, at Brownsville Church in Tulip in Dallas County, Arkansas as an affiliate of the Southern Baptist Convention. The first president was Isaac Perkins, and its first secretary was Samuel Stevenson. James Philip Eagle, governor of Arkansas and later president of the Southern Baptist Convention, presided over the Arkansas convention for 21 years. Another notable former Convention President was Mike Huckabee, who would later go on to serve as Governor of Arkansas and twice attempt to gain the Republican nomination for President of the United States.

== Affiliated organizations ==
- Arkansas Baptist Children's Homes
- Arkansas Baptist News
- Arkansas Baptist Foundation
- Arkansas Baptist Assembly, now renamed Camp Siloam
- Camp Paron
- Arkansas Woman's Missionary Union
- Ouachita Baptist University
- Williams Baptist College
