= 2025–26 Queens Royals men's basketball team =

American college basketball season

2025–26 Queens Royals men's basketball

ASUN tournament champions

NCAA tournament, First round
- Conference: Atlantic Sun Conference
- Record: 21–14 (13–5 ASUN)
- Head coach: Grant Leonard (4th season)
- Assistant coaches: Dan Bailey; Bobby Horodyski; Adam Short; Amit Tailor; Damian Dixon
- Home arena: Curry Arena

2025–26 ASUN men's basketball standings
	Conf.				Overall
Team	W		L	PCT	W		L	PCT
Central Arkansas	15	–	3	.833	22	–	12	.647
Austin Peay	15	–	3	.833	22	–	9	.710
Queens †	13	–	5	.722	21	–	14	.600
Lipscomb	12	–	6	.667	19	–	13	.594
Florida Gulf Coast	8	–	10	.444	16	–	18	.471
West Georgia*	8	–	10	.444	15	–	17	.469
Eastern Kentucky	7	–	11	.389	11	–	21	.344
Bellarmine	7	–	11	.389	13	–	19	.406
Jacksonville	7	–	11	.389	12	–	20	.375
Stetson	7	–	11	.389	12	–	21	.364
North Florida	5	–	13	.278	7	–	25	.219
North Alabama	4	–	14	.222	9	–	21	.300
† 2026 ASUN tournament winner * ineligible for the 2026 NCAA tournament due to transition from Division II

The 2025–26 Queens Royals men's basketball team represented the Queens University of Charlotte during the 2025–26 NCAA Division I men's basketball season. The Royals, led by fourth-year head coach Grant Leonard, played their home games at Curry Arena in Charlotte, North Carolina as members of the Atlantic Sun Conference.

== Previous season ==
The Royals finished the 2024–25 season 20–15, 11–7 in ASUN play, to finish in sixth place. They defeated Florida Gulf Coast, before falling to top-seeded and eventual tournament champions Lipscomb in the semifinals of the ASUN tournament. They received an invitation to the CBI, where they would defeat Northern Arizona, before falling to eventual tournament runner-up Cleveland State in the quarterfinals.

== Preseason ==
On October 17, 2025, the ASUN released their preseason polls. Queens was picked to finish first in the coaches poll, with six first-place votes and third in the media poll, with nine first-place votes.

=== Preseason rankings ===
ASUN Preseason Coaches Poll
Place	Team	Votes
1	Queens	136 (6)
2	North Alabama	117
3	Eastern Kentucky	111 (2)
4	Florida Gulf Coast	98 (2)
5	Austin Peay	94 (1)
6	Jacksonville	88
7	Lipscomb	77
8	Central Arkansas	57
9	Stetson	56
10	Bellarmine	36
11	North Florida	34 (1)
12	West Georgia	32
(#) first-place votes

ASUN Preseason Media Poll
Place	Team	Votes
1	North Alabama	519 (18)
2	Eastern Kentucky	495 (3)
3	Queens	468 (9)
4	Florida Gulf Coast	465 (12)
5	Lipscomb	408 (9)
6	Jacksonville	381
7	Austin Peay	357
8	Stetson	243
9	North Florida	192
10	Bellarmine	189
11	Central Arkansas	174
12	West Georgia	126
(#) first-place votes

=== Preseason All-ASUN Team ===
Preseason All-ASUN Team
Player	Year	Position
Chris Ashby^	Graduate Student	Guard
(^) unanimous selection

== Roster ==
2025–26 Queens Royals men's basketball team
Players
Coaches

Pos.	#	Name	Height	Weight	Year	Previous school	Hometown
G	0	Jordan Watford	6 ft 5 in (1.96 m)	185 lb (84 kg)	Fr	Lancaster High School	Lancaster, South Carolina
G	1	Nasir Mann	6 ft 5 in (1.96 m)	203 lb (92 kg)	Sr	McNeese	Gainesville, Florida
G	2	Danzelle Bullock Coles	6 ft 5 in (1.96 m)	194 lb (88 kg)	RS Fr	St. Anne's-Belfield School	Richmond, Virginia
G	3	Isaiah Henry	6 ft 4 in (1.93 m)	222 lb (101 kg)	Fr	Overtime Elite	Charlotte, North Carolina
F	4	Reid Celestin	6 ft 6 in (1.98 m)	189 lb (86 kg)	Jr	San Diego City College	Atlanta, Georgia
G	5	Kam Clark	6 ft 7 in (2.01 m)	187 lb (85 kg)	Jr	Itawamba Community College	Memphis, Tennessee
F	6	Avantae Parker	6 ft 9 in (2.06 m)	218 lb (99 kg)	Jr	Georgia Southern	Columbia, South Carolina
F	7	Gus Larson	6 ft 10 in (2.08 m)	220 lb (100 kg)	GS	California	New Canaan, Connecticut
G	8	Jimma James	6 ft 6 in (1.98 m)	192 lb (87 kg)	RS Jr	Northeastern Oklahoma A&M	Windsor, Ontario
G	9	Maban Jabriel	6 ft 9 in (2.06 m)	205 lb (93 kg)	So	Tri-City Prep	Waterloo, Ontario
G	11	Chris Ashby	6 ft 2 in (1.88 m)	193 lb (88 kg)	GS	Paris Junior College	Houston, Texas
G	12	Tyler Crider	6 ft 0 in (1.83 m)	160 lb (73 kg)	Fr	Central Carolina Community College	Matthews, North Carolina
G	13	Saif-Allah Zatari	6 ft 3 in (1.91 m)	188 lb (85 kg)	RS Fr	Amman Baccalaureate School	Amman, Jordan
G	15	Seamus Wilson	6 ft 0 in (1.83 m)	165 lb (75 kg)	RS Fr	Logos School	Moscow, Idaho
F	22	Carson Schwieger	6 ft 8 in (2.03 m)	222 lb (101 kg)	RS So	Valparaiso	Overland Park, Kansas
G	23	Matthew Walter	6 ft 3 in (1.91 m)	182 lb (83 kg)	RS Fr	IMG Academy	Honolulu, Hawaii
G	24	Yoav Berman	6 ft 6 in (1.98 m)	214 lb (97 kg)	So	Maccabi Ra'anana	Tel Aviv, Israel
G	25	Jacob Brandly	6 ft 6 in (1.98 m)	216 lb (98 kg)	Fr	Combine Academy	Holtsville, New York
G	35	Colby Christiansen	6 ft 2 in (1.88 m)	182 lb (83 kg)	Fr	Franklin High School	Portland, Oregon

Head coach

- Grant Leonard (William Penn)

Assistant coach(es)

- Dan Bailey (Queens (NC))
- Bobby Horodyski (Central Florida)
- Adam Short (Avila)
- Amit Tailor (Illinois)
- Damian Dixon (Greensboro)

Legend

- (C) Team captain
- (S) Suspended
- (I) Ineligible
- (W) Walk-on
- Injured
- Current redshirt

Roster
Last update: December 4, 2025

== Schedule and results ==
Date time, TV	Rank^{#}	Opponent^{#}	Result	Record	Site (attendance) city, state
Exhibition
October 29, 2025*; 7:00 pm		Johnson C. Smith	W 103–67	–	Curry Arena; Charlotte, NC
Non-conference regular season
November 3, 2025*; 8:00 am, YouTube		vs. Winthrop; Field of 68 Opening Day Marathon	L 74–81	0–1	Rock Hill Sports & Event Center (1,300); Rock Hill, SC
November 5, 2025*; 7:00 pm, ESPN+		Lynchburg	W 87–76	1–1	Curry Arena; Charlotte, NC
November 8, 2025*; 7:00 pm, ESPN+		at Villanova; Villanova Challenge	L 74–94	1–2	Finneran Pavilion (6,501); Villanova, PA
November 11, 2025*; 8:00 pm, ESPN+		at Duquesne; Villanova Challenge	L 81–87 ^{OT}	1–3	UPMC Cooper Fieldhouse (2,088); Pittsburgh, PA
November 15, 2025*; 3:00 pm, ESPN+		Sacred Heart	W 81–64	2–3	Curry Arena (678); Charlotte, NC
November 20, 2025*; 7:00 pm, ESPN+		UNC Greensboro; ASUN/SoCon Challenge	W 101–94	3–3	Curry Arena (637); Charlotte, NC
November 23, 2025*; 5:00 pm, ESPN+		at Furman; ASUN/SoCon Challenge	L 79–90	3–4	Timmons Arena (2,167); Greenville, SC
November 28, 2025*; 4:00 pm, ACCNX		at Virginia	L 69–94	3–5	John Paul Jones Arena (11,639); Charlottesville, VA
December 3, 2025*; 7:00 pm, WCCB/ESPN+		Gardner–Webb	W 107–74	4–5	Curry Arena (672); Charlotte, NC
December 12, 2025*; 7:00 pm, ESPN+		South Carolina State	W 102–78	5–5	Curry Arena (368); Charlotte, NC
December 14, 2025*; 5:00 pm, ACCNX		at Wake Forest	L 73–111	5–6	LJVM Coliseum (6,355); Winston-Salem, NC
December 16, 2025*; 9:00 pm, SECN		at No. 14 Arkansas	L 80–108	5–7	Bud Walton Arena (19,200); Fayetteville, AR
December 29, 2025*; 10:00 pm, SECN		at Auburn	L 65–106	5–8	Neville Arena (9,121); Auburn, AL
ASUN regular season
January 1, 2026; 7:00 pm, ESPN+		Eastern Kentucky	W 91–89	6–8 (1–0)	Curry Arena (480); Charlotte, NC
January 3, 2026; 3:00 pm, ESPN+		Bellarmine	W 98–76	7–8 (2–0)	Curry Arena (450); Charlotte, NC
January 8, 2026; 7:00 pm, ESPN+		at Jacksonville	W 77–51	8–8 (3–0)	Swisher Gymnasium (549); Jacksonville, FL
January 10, 2026; 2:00 pm, ESPN+		at North Florida	W 89–82	9–8 (4–0)	UNF Arena (1,280); Jacksonville, FL
January 15, 2026; 7:00 pm, ESPN+		at Florida Gulf Coast	W 85–74	10–8 (5–0)	Alico Arena (1,806); Fort Myers, FL
January 17, 2026; 2:00 pm, ESPN+		at Stetson	W 87–81	11–8 (6–0)	Insight Credit Union Arena (821); DeLand, FL
January 21, 2026; 7:00 pm, WCCB/ESPN+		North Alabama	W 87–62	12–8 (7–0)	Curry Arena (473); Charlotte, NC
January 24, 2026; 4:30 pm, ESPN+		at West Georgia	L 66–74	12–9 (7–1)	The Coliseum (812); Carrollton, GA
January 28, 2026; 7:00 pm, ESPN+		Central Arkansas	L 90–100	12–10 (7–2)	Curry Arena (420); Charlotte, NC
January 31, 2026; 2:00 pm, ESPN+		at Bellarmine	L 75–78	12–11 (7–3)	Knights Hall (1,473); Louisville, KY
February 5, 2026; 7:00 pm, ESPN+		Jacksonville	W 93–84	13–11 (8–3)	Curry Arena (572); Charlotte, NC
February 7, 2026; 3:00 pm, ESPN+		North Florida	W 91–72	14–11 (9–3)	Curry Arena (1,026); Charlotte, NC
February 11, 2026; 7:00 pm, ESPN+		Austin Peay	L 87–95	14–12 (9–4)	Curry Arena (423); Charlotte, NC
February 14, 2026; 4:00 pm, WCCB/ESPN+		Lipscomb	W 87–81	15–12 (10–4)	Curry Arena (390); Charlotte, NC
February 18, 2026; 7:00 pm, ESPN+		at North Alabama	W 85–78	16–12 (11–4)	CB&S Bank Arena (2,461); Florence, AL
February 21, 2026; 3:00 pm, ESPN+		West Georgia	W 91–84	17–12 (12–4)	Curry Arena (475); Charlotte, NC
February 25, 2026; 7:00 pm, ESPN+		at Eastern Kentucky	W 96–79	18–12 (13–4)	Baptist Health Arena (1,598); Richmond, KY
February 28, 2026; 2:00 pm, ESPN+		at Central Arkansas	L 79–84	18–13 (13–5)	Farris Center (1,472); Conway, AR
ASUN tournament
March 6, 2026; 7:30 p.m., ESPN+	(3)	vs. (6) West Georgia; Quarterfinal	W 71–63	19–13	VyStar Veterans Memorial Arena (2,024); Jacksonville, FL
March 7, 2026; 7:30 p.m., ESPN+	(3)	vs. (2) Austin Peay; Semifinal	W 90–83	20–13	VyStar Veterans Memorial Arena (2,052); Jacksonville, FL
March 8, 2026; 2:00 p.m., ESPN2	(3)	vs. (1) Central Arkansas; Championship	W 98–93 ^{OT}	21–13	VyStar Veterans Memorial Arena (2,066); Jacksonville, FL
NCAA Tournament
March 20, 2026; 7:35 p.m., truTV	(15 W)	vs. (2 W) No. 8 Purdue; First round	L 71–104	21–14	Enterprise Center (17,726); St. Louis, MO
*Non-conference game. ^{#}Rankings from AP Poll. (#) Tournament seedings in parentheses. W=West. All times are in Eastern.
