= 2025–26 Eastern Kentucky Colonels men's basketball team =

American college basketball season

2025–26 Eastern Kentucky Colonels men's basketball
- Conference: Atlantic Sun Conference
- Record: 11–21 (7–11 ASUN)
- Head coach: A. W. Hamilton (8th season)
- Associate head coach: Steve Lepore
- Assistant coaches: AJ Clark; Ron Jirsa; Jake Lorbach
- Home arena: Baptist Health Arena

2025–26 ASUN men's basketball standings
	Conf.				Overall
Team	W		L	PCT	W		L	PCT
Central Arkansas	15	–	3	.833	20	–	11	.645
Austin Peay	15	–	3	.833	21	–	8	.724
Queens	13	–	5	.722	18	–	13	.581
Lipscomb	12	–	6	.667	19	–	12	.613
Florida Gulf Coast	8	–	10	.444	15	–	17	.469
West Georgia*	8	–	10	.444	14	–	16	.467
Eastern Kentucky	7	–	11	.389	11	–	20	.355
Bellarmine	7	–	11	.389	13	–	18	.419
Jacksonville	7	–	11	.389	12	–	20	.375
Stetson	7	–	11	.389	11	–	20	.355
North Florida	5	–	13	.278	7	–	24	.226
North Alabama	4	–	14	.222	9	–	21	.300
† 2026 ASUN tournament winner * ineligible for the 2026 NCAA tournament due to transition from Division II; As of February 28, 2026

The 2025–26 Eastern Kentucky Colonels men's basketball team represented Eastern Kentucky University during the 2025–26 NCAA Division I men's basketball season. The Colonels, led by eighth-year head coach A. W. Hamilton, played their home games at Baptist Health Arena in Richmond, Kentucky as members of the Atlantic Sun Conference.

== Previous season ==
The Colonels finished the 2024–25 season 18–14, 12–6 in ASUN play, to finish in a tie for fourth place. They were defeated by Jacksonville in the quarterfinals of the ASUN tournament.

== Preseason ==
On October 17, 2025, the ASUN released their preseason polls. Eastern Kentucky was picked to finish second in both coaches poll, with two first-place votes and second in the media poll, with three first-place votes.

=== Preseason rankings ===
ASUN Preseason Coaches Poll
Place	Team	Votes
1	Queens	136 (6)
2	North Alabama	117
3	Eastern Kentucky	111 (2)
4	Florida Gulf Coast	98 (2)
5	Austin Peay	94 (1)
6	Jacksonville	88
7	Lipscomb	77
8	Central Arkansas	57
9	Stetson	56
10	Bellarmine	36
11	North Florida	34 (1)
12	West Georgia	32
(#) first-place votes

ASUN Preseason Media Poll
Place	Team	Votes
1	North Alabama	519 (18)
2	Eastern Kentucky	495 (3)
3	Queens	468 (9)
4	Florida Gulf Coast	465 (12)
5	Lipscomb	408 (9)
6	Jacksonville	381
7	Austin Peay	357
8	Stetson	243
9	North Florida	192
10	Bellarmine	189
11	Central Arkansas	174
12	West Georgia	126
(#) first-place votes

=== Preseason All-ASUN Team ===
Preseason All-ASUN Team
Player	Year	Position
Montavious Myrick	Graduate Student	Forward

== Roster ==
2025–26 Eastern Kentucky Colonels men's basketball team
Players
Coaches

Pos.	#	Name	Height	Weight	Year	Previous school	Hometown
G	0	Turner Buttry	5 ft 11 in (1.8 m)	165 lb (75 kg)	Sr	Bowling Green High School	Bowling Green, Kentucky
G	1	Amarr Knox	6 ft 3 in (1.91 m)	170 lb (77 kg)	Sr	Alabama State	Memphis, Tennessee
G	2	Tyler Jackson	6 ft 2 in (1.88 m)	153 lb (69 kg)	Fr	SoCal Academy	Baltimore, Maryland
G	3	MJ Williams	5 ft 10 in (1.78 m)	168 lb (76 kg)	Fr	Farmville Central High School	Rocky Mount, North Carolina
G	4	Juan Cranford Jr.	6 ft 4 in (1.93 m)	205 lb (93 kg)	So	Saint Francis	Dayton, Ohio
G/F	5	Jayden Harris	6 ft 7 in (2.01 m)	189 lb (86 kg)	RS Fr	Massanutten Military Academy	Dumfries, Virginia
G	7	Trey Coles	6 ft 4 in (1.93 m)	200 lb (91 kg)	Fr	Hargrave Military Academy	Richmond, Virginia
F	8	Jalen Cooper	6 ft 7 in (2.01 m)	215 lb (98 kg)	GS	Cal State Fullerton	St. Petersburg, Florida
G	11	Jackson Holt	6 ft 4 in (1.93 m)	185 lb (84 kg)	RS Jr	Moravian Prep	Cincinnati, Ohio
G	12	Mason Miles	6 ft 2 in (1.88 m)	187 lb (85 kg)	RS Fr	Lindsey Wilson	Louisville, Kentucky
F	13	Montavious Myrick	6 ft 8 in (2.03 m)	208 lb (94 kg)	GS	Southern Union State Community College	Atlanta, Georgia
F	14	Austin Ball	6 ft 7 in (2.01 m)	210 lb (95 kg)	RS So	George Mason	Man, West Virginia
F	21	Yvens Paul	6 ft 7 in (2.01 m)	220 lb (100 kg)	RS Jr	Florida SouthWestern State College	Naples, Florida
C	24	Asa White	6 ft 9 in (2.06 m)	200 lb (91 kg)	Jr	Johnson C. Smith	Raleigh, North Carolina

Head coach

- A. W. Hamilton (Marshall)

Assistant coach(es)

- Steve Lepore (Wake Forest)
- AJ Clark (Pfeiffer)
- Ron Jirsa (Gettysburg)
- Jake Lorbach (Ohio State)

Legend

- (C) Team captain
- (S) Suspended
- (I) Ineligible
- (W) Walk-on
- Injured
- Current redshirt

Roster
Last update: December 4, 2025

== Schedule and results ==
Date time, TV	Rank^{#}	Opponent^{#}	Result	Record	Site (attendance) city, state
Exhibition
October 27, 2025*; 6:30 pm		at Morehead State	W 107–93	–	Ellis Johnson Arena (1,767); Morehead, KY
Non-conference regular season
November 6, 2025*; 8:00 pm, ESPN+		vs. Midway	W 122–60	1–0	Seabury Center (700); Berea, KY
November 10, 2025*; 7:00 pm, ESPN+		Western Kentucky	L 79–87	1–1	Baptist Health Arena (4,021); Richmond, KY
November 12, 2025*; 8:00 pm, SECN+		at Vanderbilt	L 62–92	1–2	Memorial Gymnasium (5,667); Nashville, TN
November 18, 2025*; 7:00 pm, ESPN+		at Kent State	L 78–93	1–3	MAC Center (1,802); Kent, OH
November 22, 2025*; 3:00 pm, ESPN+		Mercer; ASUN/SoCon Challenge	L 83–95	1–4	Baptist Health Arena (1,700); Richmond, KY
November 24, 2025*; 7:00 pm, ESPN+		at Northern Kentucky	L 71–82	1–5	Truist Arena (2,346); Highland Heights, KY
November 29, 2025*; 5:00 pm, ESPN+		Wofford	L 77–83	1–6	Baptist Health Arena (708); Richmond, KY
December 3, 2025*; 8:00 pm, ESPN+		at Illinois State	L 78–89	1–7	CEFCU Arena (4,197); Normal, IL
December 6, 2025*; 4:00 pm, ESPN+		IU East	W 122–67	2–7	Baptist Health Arena (1,136); Richmond, KY
December 10, 2025*; 8:00 pm, ESPN+		at Eastern Illinois	W 68–59	3–7	Groniger Arena (1,031); Charleston, IL
December 13, 2025*; 3:00 pm, ESPN+		Miami (OH)	L 69–79	3–8	Baptist Health Arena (600); Richmond, KY
December 17, 2025*; 7:00 pm, ESPN+		at Jacksonville State	W 62–59	4–8	Pete Mathews Coliseum (unknown); Jacksonville, AL
December 21, 2025*; 5:00 pm, ESPN+		at Wichita State	L 57–88	4–9	Charles Koch Arena (5,890); Wichita, KS
ASUN regular season
January 1, 2026; 7:00 pm, ESPN+		at Queens	L 89–91	4–10 (0–1)	Curry Arena (480); Charlotte, NC
January 3, 2026; 2:00 pm, ESPN+		at West Georgia	L 76–88	4–11 (0–2)	The Coliseum (714); Carrollton, GA
January 8, 2026; 7:00 pm, ESPN+		North Alabama	W 88–80	5–11 (1–2)	Baptist Health Arena (791); Richmond, KY
January 10, 2026; 4:00 pm, ESPN+		Central Arkansas	W 79–75	6–11 (2–2)	Baptist Health Arena (1,171); Richmond, KY
January 15, 2026; 8:00 pm, ESPN+		at Austin Peay	L 72–74	6–12 (2–3)	F&M Bank Arena (2,782); Clarksville, TN
January 17, 2026; 7:00 pm, ESPN+		Bellarmine	W 89–69	7–12 (3–3)	Baptist Health Arena (1,511); Richmond, KY
January 22, 2026; 7:00 pm, ESPN+		at North Florida	L 85–87	7–13 (3–4)	UNF Arena (1,317); Jacksonville, FL
January 24, 2026; 3:00 pm, ESPN+		at Jacksonville	L 76–81 ^{OT}	7–14 (3–5)	Swisher Gymnasium (652); Jacksonville, FL
January 28, 2026; 7:00 pm, ESPN+		Austin Peay	L 82–90	7–15 (3–6)	Baptist Health Arena (1,244); Richmond, KY
January 31, 2026; 4:30 pm, ESPN+		at Central Arkansas	L 81-90	7-16 (3-7)	Farris Center (1,128); Conway, AR
February 5, 2026; 7:00 pm, ESPN+		Florida Gulf Coast	W 76-74	8-16 (4-7)	Baptist Health Arena (1,608); Richmond, KY
February 7, 2026; 5:00 pm, ESPN+		Stetson	W 100-88	9-16 (5-7)	Baptist Health Arena (1,670); Richmond, KY
February 11, 2026; 8:00 pm, ESPN+		at Lipscomb	L 61-75	9-17 (5-8)	Allen Arena (1,186); Nashville, TN
February 15, 2026; 4:00 pm, ESPNU		at North Alabama	L 78–84	9–18 (5–9)	CB&S Bank Arena (2,815); Florence, AL
February 18, 2026; 7:00 pm, ESPN+		West Georgia	W 81–80	10–18 (6–9)	Baptist Health Arena (1,379); Richmond, KY
February 21, 2026; 7:00 pm, ESPN+		at Bellarmine	W 95–92	11–18 (7–9)	Knights Hall (1,921); Louisville, KY
February 25, 2026; 7:00 pm, ESPN+		Queens	L 79–96	11–19 (7–10)	Baptist Health Arena (1,598); Richmond, KY
February 28, 2026; 4:00 pm, ESPN+		Lipscomb	L 77–80	11–20 (7–11)	Baptist Health Arena (1,673); Richmond, KY
ASUN tournament
March 4, 2026; 5:00 pm, ESPN+	(7)	vs. (10) Stetson; First round	L 76–92	11–21	UNF Arena; Jacksonville, FL
*Non-conference game. ^{#}Rankings from AP Poll. (#) Tournament seedings in parentheses. All times are in Eastern.
