= 2025–26 Lipscomb Bisons men's basketball team =

American college basketball season

2025–26 Lipscomb Bisons men's basketball
- Conference: Atlantic Sun Conference
- Record: 19–13 (12–6 ASUN)
- Head coach: Kevin Carroll (1st season)
- Assistant coaches: Vic Sfera; Scott Cherry; Derek Brooks; Jack McMahon
- Home arena: Allen Arena

2025–26 ASUN men's basketball standings
	Conf.				Overall
Team	W		L	PCT	W		L	PCT
Central Arkansas	15	–	3	.833	22	–	12	.647
Austin Peay	15	–	3	.833	22	–	9	.710
Queens †	13	–	5	.722	21	–	13	.618
Lipscomb	12	–	6	.667	19	–	13	.594
Florida Gulf Coast	8	–	10	.444	16	–	18	.471
West Georgia*	8	–	10	.444	15	–	17	.469
Eastern Kentucky	7	–	11	.389	11	–	21	.344
Bellarmine	7	–	11	.389	13	–	19	.406
Jacksonville	7	–	11	.389	12	–	20	.375
Stetson	7	–	11	.389	12	–	21	.364
North Florida	5	–	13	.278	7	–	25	.219
North Alabama	4	–	14	.222	9	–	21	.300
† 2026 ASUN tournament winner * ineligible for the 2026 NCAA tournament due to transition from Division II; As of March 8, 2026

The 2025–26 Lipscomb Bisons men's basketball team represented Lipscomb University during the 2025–26 NCAA Division I men's basketball season. The Bisons, led by first-year head coach Kevin Carroll, played their home games at the Allen Arena in Nashville, Tennessee as members of the Atlantic Sun Conference.

== Previous season ==
The Bisons finished the 2024–25 season 25–10, 14–4 in ASUN play, to finish as ASUN regular season champions. They defeated Central Arkansas, Queens, and North Alabama to win the ASUN tournament championship, sending the Bisons to just their second ever NCAA tournament appearance, and their first since 2018. In the NCAA tournament, the Bisons would receive the #14 seed in the South Region, where they would lose in the First Round to #3 region seed Iowa State.

On April 9, 2025, it was announced that head coach Lennie Acuff would be leaving the program, after six seasons, in order to take the head coaching position at Samford. A week later, on April 16, the school announced that they would be hiring Trevecca head coach and former Lipscomb assistant Kevin Carroll as Acuff's successor.

== Preseason ==
On October 17, 2025, the ASUN released their preseason polls. Lipscomb was picked to finish seventh in the coaches poll and fifth in the media poll, while receiving nine first-place votes in the latter poll.

=== Preseason rankings ===
ASUN Preseason Coaches Poll
Place	Team	Votes
1	Queens	136 (6)
2	North Alabama	117
3	Eastern Kentucky	111 (2)
4	Florida Gulf Coast	98 (2)
5	Austin Peay	94 (1)
6	Jacksonville	88
7	Lipscomb	77
8	Central Arkansas	57
9	Stetson	56
10	Bellarmine	36
11	North Florida	34 (1)
12	West Georgia	32
(#) first-place votes

ASUN Preseason Media Poll
Place	Team	Votes
1	North Alabama	519 (18)
2	Eastern Kentucky	495 (3)
3	Queens	468 (9)
4	Florida Gulf Coast	465 (12)
5	Lipscomb	408 (9)
6	Jacksonville	381
7	Austin Peay	357
8	Stetson	243
9	North Florida	192
10	Bellarmine	189
11	Central Arkansas	174
12	West Georgia	126
(#) first-place votes

=== Preseason All-ASUN Team ===
Preseason All-ASUN Team
Player	Year	Position
Charlie Williams	Senior	Center

== Roster ==
2025–26 Lipscomb Bisons men's basketball team
Players
Coaches

Pos.	#	Name	Height	Weight	Year	Previous school	Hometown
F	0	Luke Jack	6 ft 6 in (1.98 m)	184 lb (83 kg)	Fr	Creekview High School	Canton, Georgia
G	1	Mateo Esmeraldo	6 ft 1 in (1.85 m)	176 lb (80 kg)	RS Jr	Trevecca	Monroe, Connecticut
F	2	Devyn Martin	6 ft 8 in (2.03 m)	217 lb (98 kg)	Fr	West High School	Knoxville, Tennessee
F	3	Kennedy Okpara	6 ft 7 in (2.01 m)	206 lb (93 kg)	Fr	Wilson Academy	Lagos, Nigeria
F	6	Or Ashkenazi	6 ft 5 in (1.96 m)	197 lb (89 kg)	Fr	Ironi Eilat B.C.	Eilat, Israel
G	7	Ethan Duncan	6 ft 0 in (1.83 m)	170 lb (77 kg)	RS Jr	Lubbock Christian	Lubbock, Texas
G	11	Logan Suber	6 ft 0 in (1.83 m)	175 lb (79 kg)	RS So	Mt. Zion Prep Academy	Fredericksburg, Virginia
G	12	Luke Carter	6 ft 1 in (1.85 m)	189 lb (86 kg)	Jr	Christian Academy of Knoxville	Knoxville, Tennessee
F	15	Josh Scott	6 ft 6 in (1.98 m)	194 lb (88 kg)	Fr	Fort Payne High School	Fort Payne, Alabama
G/F	23	Kellan Boylan	6 ft 7 in (2.01 m)	203 lb (92 kg)	Sr	Air Force	Overland Park, Kansas
F	24	Cole Middleton	6 ft 6 in (1.98 m)	240 lb (109 kg)	GS	Anderson	Atlanta, Georgia
F	26	Titas Sargiunas	6 ft 4 in (1.93 m)	185 lb (84 kg)	Jr	High Point	Kaunas, Lithuania
G	30	Ross Candelino	6 ft 5 in (1.96 m)	198 lb (90 kg)	RS Jr	Wisconsin	Jacksonville, Florida
C	33	Charlie Williams	6 ft 10 in (2.08 m)	225 lb (102 kg)	Sr	William & Mary	Carmel, Indiana
F	35	Grant Asman	6 ft 11 in (2.11 m)	217 lb (98 kg)	GS	Kimberly High School	Kimberly, Wisconsin

Head coach

- Kevin Carroll (Berry)

Assistant coach(es)

- Vic Sfera (Memphis)
- Scott Cherry (North Carolina)
- Derek Brooks (Air Force)
- Jack McMahon (Presbyterian)

Legend

- (C) Team captain
- (S) Suspended
- (I) Ineligible
- (W) Walk-on
- Injured
- Current redshirt

Roster
Last update: December 9, 2025

== Schedule and results ==
Date time, TV	Rank^{#}	Opponent^{#}	Result	Record	Site (attendance) city, state
Non-conference regular season
November 3, 2025*; 7:00 pm, SECN+		at Vanderbilt	L 61–105	0–1	Memorial Gymnasium (6,577); Nashville, TN
November 9, 2025*; 1:00 pm, ESPN+		at Mercer; ASUN/SoCon Challenge	L 77–92	0–2	Hawkins Arena (604); Macon, GA
November 11, 2025*; 5:30 pm, ESPN+		at UNC Asheville	L 64–69	0–3	Kimmel Arena (617); Asheville, NC
November 15, 2025*; 4:00 pm, ESPN+		Bryan	W 98–53	1–3	Allen Arena (2,018); Nashville, TN
November 19, 2025*; 7:30 pm, ESPN+		at Belmont; Battle of the Boulevard	L 68–75	1–4	Curb Event Center (4,132); Nashville, TN
November 22, 2025*; 4:00 pm, ESPN+		Western Carolina; ASUN/SoCon Challenge	W 83–62	2–4	Allen Arena (1,194); Nashville, TN
November 26, 2025*; 3:00 pm, ESPN+		at Marshall	W 90–67	3–4	Cam Henderson Center (3,649); Huntington, WV
November 29, 2025*; 2:00 pm, ESPN+		at Southeast Missouri State	W 88–77	4–4	Show Me Center (698); Cape Girardeau, MO
December 3, 2025*; 11:00 am, ESPN+		Tennessee Tech	W 83–80	5–4	Allen Arena (1,905); Nashville, TN
December 7, 2025*; 4:00 pm, ESPN+		Alabama A&M	W 92–58	6–4	Allen Arena (853); Nashville, TN
December 16, 2025*; 5:00 pm, ACCN		at No. 3 Duke	L 73–97	6–5	Cameron Indoor Stadium (9,314); Durham, NC
December 20, 2025*; 1:00 pm, ESPN+		Blue Mountain Christian	W 123–60	7–5	Allen Arena (414); Nashville, TN
December 29, 2025*; 6:00 pm, ESPN+		at Cincinnati	L 62–89	7–6	Fifth Third Arena (9,793); Cincinnati, OH
ASUN regular season
January 1, 2026; 1:00 pm, ESPN+		Jacksonville	W 76–57	8–6 (1–0)	Allen Arena (804); Nashville, TN
January 3, 2026; 4:00 pm, ESPN+		North Florida	W 82–74	9–6 (2–0)	Allen Arena (924); Nashville, TN
January 8, 2026; 6:00 pm, ESPN+		at Stetson	L 83–91	9–7 (2–1)	Insight Credit Union Arena (669); DeLand, FL
January 10, 2026; 3:00 pm, ESPN+		at Florida Gulf Coast	W 84–77	10–7 (3–1)	Alico Arena (2,344); Fort Myers, FL
January 15, 2026; 7:00 pm, ESPN+		Bellarmine	W 81–71	11–7 (4–1)	Allen Arena (977); Nashville, TN
January 17, 2026; 6:00 pm, ESPN+		Austin Peay	W 82–72	12–7 (5–1)	Allen Arena (2,837); Nashville, TN
January 22, 2026; 7:00 pm, ESPN+		Stetson	W 79–74 ^{OT}	13–7 (6–1)	Allen Arena (516); Nashville, TN
January 24, 2026; 4:00 pm, ESPN+		Florida Gulf Coast	W 86–71	14–7 (7–1)	Allen Arena (537); Nashville, TN
January 29, 2026; 6:00 pm, ESPN+		at Jacksonville	L 65–70	14–8 (7–2)	Swisher Gymnasium (883); Jacksonville, FL
January 31, 2026; 1:00 pm, ESPN+		at North Florida	W 100–94	15–8 (8–2)	UNF Arena (1,421); Jacksonville, FL
February 4, 2026; 7:00 pm, ESPN+		at Austin Peay	L 76–87	15–9 (8–3)	F&M Bank Arena (3,397); Clarksville, TN
February 7, 2026; 4:00 pm, ESPN+		Central Arkansas	L 78–86	15–10 (8–4)	Allen Arena (1,147); Nashville, TN
February 11, 2026; 7:00 pm, ESPN+		Eastern Kentucky	W 75–61	16–10 (9–4)	Allen Arena (1,186); Nashville, TN
February 14, 2026; 3:00 pm, ESPN+		at Queens	L 81–87	16–11 (9–5)	Curry Arena (390); Charlotte, NC
February 18, 2026; 6:30 p.m., ESPN+		at Bellarmine	W 75–72	17–11 (10–5)	Knights Hall (1,782); Louisville, KY
February 21, 2026; 4:00 pm, ESPN+		North Alabama	W 73–51	18–11 (11–5)	Allen Arena (1,305); Nashville, TN
February 25, 2026; 6:00 pm, ESPN+		at West Georgia	L 77–84	18–12 (11–6)	The Coliseum (1,447); Carrollton, GA
February 28, 2026; 3:00 pm, ESPN+		at Eastern Kentucky	W 80–77	19–12 (12–6)	Baptist Health Arena (1,673); Richmond, KY
ASUN tournament
March 6, 2026; 2:30 p.m., ESPN+	(4)	vs. (5) Florida Gulf Coast; Quarterfinals	L 53–77	19–13	VyStar Veterans Memorial Arena; Jacksonville, FL
*Non-conference game. ^{#}Rankings from AP Poll. (#) Tournament seedings in parentheses. All times are in Eastern.
