= 2025–26 Florida Gulf Coast Eagles men's basketball team =

American college basketball season

2025–26 Florida Gulf Coast Eagles men's basketball
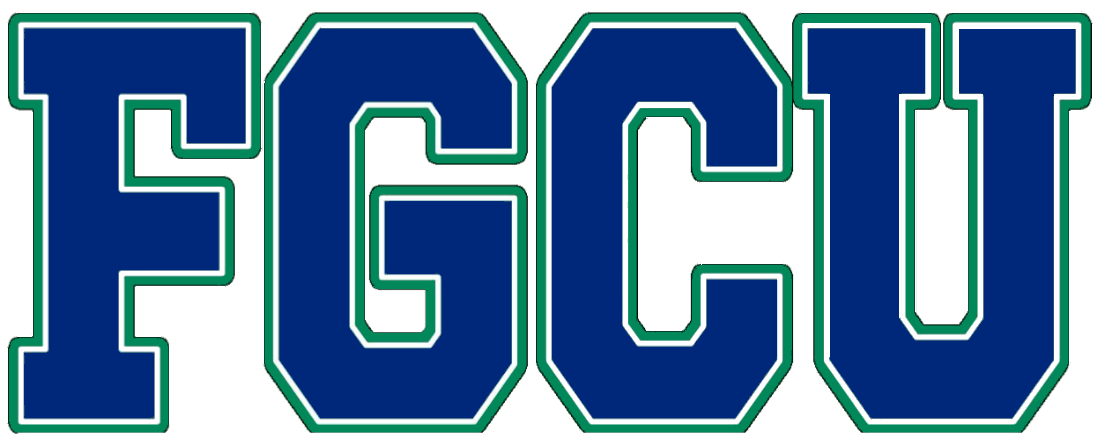
- Conference: Atlantic Sun Conference
- Record: 16–18 (8–10 ASUN)
- Head coach: Pat Chambers (4th season)
- Associate head coach: Kyle Griffin
- Assistant coaches: David Caporaletti; DJ Irving; Dominic Morris; Will Chlebek; Ryan Chlebek
- Home arena: Alico Arena

2025–26 ASUN men's basketball standings
	Conf.				Overall
Team	W		L	PCT	W		L	PCT
Central Arkansas	15	–	3	.833	22	–	12	.647
Austin Peay	15	–	3	.833	22	–	9	.710
Queens †	13	–	5	.722	21	–	14	.600
Lipscomb	12	–	6	.667	19	–	13	.594
Florida Gulf Coast	8	–	10	.444	16	–	18	.471
West Georgia*	8	–	10	.444	15	–	17	.469
Eastern Kentucky	7	–	11	.389	11	–	21	.344
Bellarmine	7	–	11	.389	13	–	19	.406
Jacksonville	7	–	11	.389	12	–	20	.375
Stetson	7	–	11	.389	12	–	21	.364
North Florida	5	–	13	.278	7	–	25	.219
North Alabama	4	–	14	.222	9	–	21	.300
† 2026 ASUN tournament winner * ineligible for the 2026 NCAA tournament due to transition from Division II

The 2025–26 Florida Gulf Coast Eagles men's basketball team represented Florida Gulf Coast University during the 2025–26 NCAA Division I men's basketball season. The Eagles, led by fourth-year head coach Pat Chambers, played their home games at Alico Arena in Fort Myers, Florida as members of the Atlantic Sun Conference.

== Previous season ==
The Eagles finished the 2024–25 season 19–15, 13–5 in ASUN play to finish in third place. They were defeated by Queens in the quarterfinals of the ASUN tournament.

== Preseason ==
On October 17, 2025, the ASUN released their preseason polls. Florida Gulf Coast was picked to finish fourth in the coaches poll, with 2 first-place votes and fourth in the media poll, with twelve first-place votes.

=== Preseason rankings ===
ASUN Preseason Coaches Poll
Place	Team	Votes
1	Queens	136 (6)
2	North Alabama	117
3	Eastern Kentucky	111 (2)
4	Florida Gulf Coast	98 (2)
5	Austin Peay	94 (1)
6	Jacksonville	88
7	Lipscomb	77
8	Central Arkansas	57
9	Stetson	56
10	Bellarmine	36
11	North Florida	34 (1)
12	West Georgia	32
(#) first-place votes

ASUN Preseason Media Poll
Place	Team	Votes
1	North Alabama	519 (18)
2	Eastern Kentucky	495 (3)
3	Queens	468 (9)
4	Florida Gulf Coast	465 (12)
5	Lipscomb	408 (9)
6	Jacksonville	381
7	Austin Peay	357
8	Stetson	243
9	North Florida	192
10	Bellarmine	189
11	Central Arkansas	174
12	West Georgia	126
(#) first-place votes

=== Preseason All-ASUN Team ===
No players were named to the All-ASUN team.

== Roster ==
2025–26 Florida Gulf Coast Eagles men's basketball team
Players
Coaches

Pos.	#	Name	Height	Weight	Year	Previous school	Hometown
PG	0	Jack Reddick	6 ft 3 in (1.91 m)	—	So	Lyon County High School	Eddyville, KY
G	1	Rahmir Barno	6 ft 0 in (1.83 m)	155 lb (70 kg)	Jr	Imhotep Charter High School	Philadelphia, PA
G	2	Darren Williams	6 ft 4 in (1.93 m)	—	So	Archbishop Ryan High School	Philadelphia, PA
F	3	Gabe Tanner	6 ft 4 in (1.93 m)	—	Fr	Perkiomen School	Scranton, PA
G	4	Matt McCarthy	6 ft 3 in (1.91 m)	—	Fr	Episcopal Academy	Aston, PA
F	6	Rory Stewart	6 ft 8 in (2.03 m)	230 lb (104 kg)	Sr	Rhode Island	London, England
G	7	Jordan Ellerbee	6 ft 2 in (1.88 m)	—	Fr	St. Joseph's Preparatory School	Philadelphia, PA
SG	8	BB Washington	6 ft 5 in (1.96 m)	—	So	Christian Academy of Louisville	Houston, TX
G	10	George Washington III	6 ft 2 in (1.88 m)	195 lb (88 kg)	Jr	Richmond	Louisville, KY
F	12	Evan Barlow	6 ft 4 in (1.93 m)	—	RS Fr	Morton High School	Morton, IL
F	15	Michael Duax	6 ft 5 in (1.96 m)	215 lb (98 kg)	RS Sr	Northern Iowa	Dubuque, IA
G	20	J.R. Konieczny	6 ft 7 in (2.01 m)	205 lb (93 kg)	GS	Notre Dame	South Bend, IN
C	21	Tristen Guillouette	6 ft 10 in (2.08 m)	—	So	George School	Willingboro, NJ
F	23	Chase Konieczny	6 ft 4 in (1.93 m)	—	Fr	St. Joseph High School	South Bend, IN
G	31	Brandon Dwyer	6 ft 3 in (1.91 m)	180 lb (82 kg)	GS	La Salle	Newark, DE
F	32	Isaiah Malone	6 ft 8 in (2.03 m)	—	Jr	Saint Francis (IN)	LaGrange, IN

Head coach

- Pat Chambers (Philadelphia)

Assistant coach(es)

- Kyle Griffin (Siena)
- David Caporaletti (Philadelphia)
- DJ Irving (Boston University)
- Dominic Morris (Boston University)
- Will Chlebek (Florida Gulf Coast)
- Ryan Chlebek (Wooster)

Legend

- (C) Team captain
- (S) Suspended
- (I) Ineligible
- (W) Walk-on
- Injured
- Current redshirt

Roster
Last update: November 20, 2025

== Schedule and results ==
Date time, TV	Rank^{#}	Opponent^{#}	Result	Record	Site (attendance) city, state
Non-conference regular season
November 3, 2025*; 7:00 p.m., ESPN+		New College (FL)	W 96–60	1–0	Alico Arena (2,410); Fort Myers, FL
November 7, 2025*; 7:30 p.m., Peacock		at No. 17 Illinois	L 70–113	1–1	State Farm Center (15,544); Champaign, IL
November 11, 2025*; 7:00 p.m., ESPN+		Georgia Southern	L 94–95	1–2	Alico Arena (1,848); Fort Myers, FL
November 15, 2024*; 1:00 p.m., ESPN+		Chattanooga	W 91–73	2–2	Alico Arena (1,572); Fort Myers, FL
November 19, 2024*; 1:00 p.m., ESPN+		at Samford	W 77–62	3–2	Pete Hanna Center (2,173); Homewood, AL
November 24, 2025*; 7:00 p.m., FLO		Oral Roberts; GEICO Coconut Hoops	W 93–88	4–2	Alico Arena (1,195); Fort Myers, FL
November 25, 2025*; 7:00 p.m., FLO		Rice; GEICO Coconut Hoops	W 78–63 ^{OT}	5–2	Alico Arena (984); Fort Myers, FL
November 26, 2025*; 7:00 p.m., FLO		Kennesaw State; GEICO Coconut Hoops	L 100−102 ^{OT}	5−3	Alico Arena; Fort Myers, FL
December 3, 2025*; 7:00 p.m., ESPN+		at FIU	L 83–89	5–4	Ocean Bank Convocation Center (633); Miami, FL
December 7, 2025*; 2:00 p.m., ESPN+		Florida Atlantic	L 76–81	5–5	Alico Arena (2,574); Fort Myers, FL
December 14, 2025*; 4:00 p.m., MW Network		at New Mexico	L 59–75	5–6	The Pit (12,204); Albuquerque, NM
December 20, 2025*; 5:00 p.m., ESPN+		at UCF	L 80–102	5–7	Addition Financial Arena (5,481); Orlando, FL
December 28, 2025*; 2:00 p.m., ESPN+		Fort Lauderdale	W 84–43	6–7	Alico Arena (1,753); Fort Myers, FL
ASUN regular season
January 1, 2026; 8:00 p.m., ESPN+		at Central Arkansas	L 83–85	6–8 (0–1)	Farris Center (796); Conway, AK
January 3, 2026; 8:00 p.m., ESPN+		at North Alabama	W 72–55	7–8 (1–1)	CB&S Bank Arena at Flowers Hall (2,534); Florence, AL
January 8, 2026; 7:00 p.m., ESPN+		Austin Peay	L 71–82	7–9 (1–2)	Alico Arena (1,762); Fort Myers, FL
January 10, 2026; 4:00 p.m., ESPN+		Lipscomb	L 77–84	7–10 (1–3)	Alico Arena (2,344); Fort Myers, FL
January 15, 2026; 7:00 p.m., ESPN+		Queens	L 74–85	7–11 (1–4)	Alico Arena (1,806); Fort Myers, FL
January 17, 2026; 2:00 p.m., ESPN+		West Georgia	W 90–72	8–11 (2–4)	Alico Arena (1,693); Fort Myers, FL
January 22, 2026; 8:00 p.m., ESPN+		at Austin Peay	L 62–83	8–12 (2–5)	F&M Bank Arena (789); Clarksville, TN
January 24, 2026; 5:00 p.m., ESPN+		at Lipscomb	L 71–86	8–13 (2–6)	Allen Arena (537); Nashville, TN
January 29, 2026; 7:00 p.m., ESPN+		North Alabama	W 72–64	9–13 (3–6)	Alico Arena (1,649); Fort Myers, FL
January 31, 2026; 3:00 p.m., ESPN+		at Jacksonville	W 68-49	10-13 (4-6)	Swisher Gymnasium (612); Jacksonville, FL
February 5, 2026; 7:00 p.m., ESPN+		at Eastern Kentucky	L 74-76	10-14 (4-7)	Alumni Coliseum (1,608); Richmond, KY
February 7, 2026; 2:00 p.m., ESPN+		at Bellarmine	L 65-81	10-15 (4-8)	Knights Hall (1,528); Louisville,KY
February 11, 2026; 7:00 p.m., ESPN+		North Florida	W 90-81	11-15 (5-8)	Alico Arena (1,650); Fort Myers, FL
February 14, 2026; 2:00 p.m., ESPN+		Stetson	W 78–76	12–15 (6–8)	Alico Arena (1,508); Fort Myers, FL
February 18, 2026; 7:00 p.m., ESPN+		Jacksonville	W 86–84	13–15 (7–8)	Alico Arena (1,861); Fort Myers, FL
February 21, 2026; 2:00 p.m., ESPN+		Central Arkansas	W 75–71 ^{OT}	14–15 (8–8)	Alico Arena (2,027); Fort Myers, FL
February 26, 2026; 7:00 p.m., ESPN+		at North Florida	L 70–76	14–16 (8–9)	UNF Arena (2,156); Jacksonville, FL
February 28, 2026; 2:00 p.m., ESPN+		at Stetson	L 63–78	14–17 (8–10)	Insight Credit Union Arena (682); DeLand, FL
ASUN tournament
March 4, 2026; 2:30 pm, ESPN+	(5)	vs. (12) North Alabama; First round	W 69–58	15–17	UNF Arena; Jacksonville, FL
March 6, 2026; 2:30 pm, ESPN+	(5)	vs. (4) Lipscomb; Quarterfinals	W 77–53	16–17	VyStar Veterans Memorial Arena; Jacksonville, FL
March 7, 2026; 5:00 pm, ESPN+	(5)	vs. (1) Central Arkansas; Semifinals	L 63–73	16–18	VyStar Veterans Memorial Arena; Jacksonville, FL
*Non-conference game. ^{#}Rankings from AP Poll. (#) Tournament seedings in parentheses. All times are in Eastern.
