= 2025–26 Stetson Hatters men's basketball team =

American college basketball season

2025–26 Stetson Hatters men's basketball
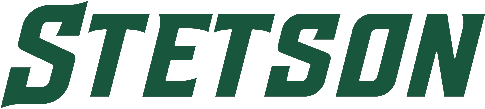
- Conference: Atlantic Sun Conference
- Record: 12–21 (7–11 ASUN)
- Head coach: Donnie Jones (7th season)
- Assistant coaches: Shawn Finney; Joey Gruden; Scott Bracco; Christian Webster; Chase Crawford
- Home arena: Insight Credit Union Arena

2025–26 ASUN men's basketball standings
	Conf.				Overall
Team	W		L	PCT	W		L	PCT
Central Arkansas	15	–	3	.833	20	–	11	.645
Austin Peay	15	–	3	.833	21	–	8	.724
Queens	13	–	5	.722	18	–	13	.581
Lipscomb	12	–	6	.667	19	–	12	.613
Florida Gulf Coast	8	–	10	.444	15	–	17	.469
West Georgia*	8	–	10	.444	15	–	16	.484
Eastern Kentucky	7	–	11	.389	11	–	21	.344
Bellarmine	7	–	11	.389	13	–	18	.419
Jacksonville	7	–	11	.389	12	–	20	.375
Stetson	7	–	11	.389	12	–	20	.375
North Florida	5	–	13	.278	7	–	25	.219
North Alabama	4	–	14	.222	9	–	21	.300
† 2026 ASUN tournament winner * ineligible for the 2026 NCAA tournament due to transition from Division II; As of March 4, 2026

The 2025–26 Stetson Hatters men's basketball team represented Stetson University during the 2025–26 NCAA Division I men's basketball season. The Hatters, led by seventh-year head coach Donnie Jones, played their home games at the Insight Credit Union Arena in DeLand, Florida as members of the Atlantic Sun Conference.

== Previous season ==
The Hatters finished the 2024–25 season 8–24, 6–12 in ASUN play, to finish in ninth place. They were defeated by Central Arkansas in the first round of the ASUN tournament.

== Preseason ==
On October 17, 2025, the ASUN released their preseason polls. Stetson was picked to finish ninth in the coaches poll and eighth in the media poll.

=== Preseason rankings ===
ASUN Preseason Coaches Poll
Place	Team	Votes
1	Queens	136 (6)
2	North Alabama	117
3	Eastern Kentucky	111 (2)
4	Florida Gulf Coast	98 (2)
5	Austin Peay	94 (1)
6	Jacksonville	88
7	Lipscomb	77
8	Central Arkansas	57
9	Stetson	56
10	Bellarmine	36
11	North Florida	34 (1)
12	West Georgia	32
(#) first-place votes

ASUN Preseason Media Poll
Place	Team	Votes
1	North Alabama	519 (18)
2	Eastern Kentucky	495 (3)
3	Queens	468 (9)
4	Florida Gulf Coast	465 (12)
5	Lipscomb	408 (9)
6	Jacksonville	381
7	Austin Peay	357
8	Stetson	243
9	North Florida	192
10	Bellarmine	189
11	Central Arkansas	174
12	West Georgia	126
(#) first-place votes

=== Preseason All-ASUN Team ===
Preseason All-ASUN Team
Player	Year	Position
Jamie Phillips Jr.	Sophomore	Guard

== Roster ==
2025–26 Stetson Hatters men's basketball team
Players
Coaches

Pos.	#	Name	Height	Weight	Year	Previous school	Hometown
G	0	Jamie Phillips Jr.	6 ft 5 in (1.96 m)	245 lb (111 kg)	So	Winter Haven High School	Winter Haven, Florida
G	1	Ethan Copeland	6 ft 2 in (1.88 m)	184 lb (83 kg)	Jr	Salt Lake Community College	Sunnyside, Washington
G	2	Isaac Jones	6 ft 1 in (1.85 m)	190 lb (86 kg)	RS So	Father Lopez Catholic High School	DeLand, Florida
G	3	Calvin Sirmans III	5 ft 8 in (1.73 m)	156 lb (71 kg)	Jr	Keiser	Lake Worth Beach, Florida
G	4	Daniel Macgregor	6 ft 0 in (1.83 m)	185 lb (84 kg)	So	Calvary Christian High School	Clearwater, Florida
G	8	Miller McGowan	6 ft 1 in (1.85 m)	200 lb (91 kg)	Fr	Atlanta Classical Academy	Atlanta, Georgia
F	9	Collin Kuhl	6 ft 8 in (2.03 m)	220 lb (100 kg)	Jr	Georgia Southern	Holly Springs, North Carolina
F	12	Matar Diop	6 ft 10 in (2.08 m)	220 lb (100 kg)	Jr	Loyola Marymount	Dakar, Senegal
F	13	Alex Doyle	6 ft 9 in (2.06 m)	210 lb (95 kg)	Jr	DME Academy	Cholet, France
G	15	J.R. Leonard	6 ft 4 in (1.93 m)	206 lb (93 kg)	Fr	Riverwood High School	Atlanta, Georgia
F	18	Janusz Ratowski	6 ft 11 in (2.11 m)	240 lb (109 kg)	RS Fr	Texas A&M	Chotomów, Poland
G	20	Ben Gladieux	6 ft 7 in (2.01 m)	190 lb (86 kg)	RS Fr	Crossroads Christian School	Raleigh, North Carolina
F	21	Finley Sheridan	6 ft 10 in (2.08 m)	210 lb (95 kg)	RS Jr	Long Island Lutheran High School	Merrick, New York
G	32	Jake Johnson	6 ft 5 in (1.96 m)	192 lb (87 kg)	GS	IU East	St. Leon, Indiana
G	51	Sean Morgan	6 ft 2 in (1.88 m)	185 lb (84 kg)	Fr	Overtime Elite	Huntsville, Alabama

Head coach

- Donnie Jones (Pikeville)

Assistant coach(es)

- Shawn Finney (Fairmont State)
- Joey Gruden (Dayton)
- Scott Bracco (Jacksonville State)
- Christian Webster (Harvard)
- Chase Crawford (Georgia)

Legend

- (C) Team captain
- (S) Suspended
- (I) Ineligible
- (W) Walk-on
- Injured
- Current redshirt

Roster
Last update: December 4, 2025

== Schedule and results ==
Date time, TV	Rank^{#}	Opponent^{#}	Result	Record	Site (attendance) city, state
Non-conference regular season
November 3, 2025*; 7:00 pm, ESPN+		at Rhode Island	L 62–93	0–1	Ryan Center (3,269); Kingston, RI
November 7, 2025*; 7:00 pm, ESPN+		Fort Lauderdale	W 106–77	1–1	Insight Credit Union Arena (633); DeLand, FL
November 10, 2025*; 7:00 pm, ACCN		at Miami (FL)	L 61–102	1–2	Watsco Center (4,105); Coral Gables, FL
November 16, 2025*; 1:00 pm, ESPN+		at Western Carolina; ASUN/SoCon Challenge	L 65–76	1–3	Ramsey Center (1,698); Cullowhee, NC
November 19, 2025*; 7:00 pm, ESPN+		Howard	W 64–60	2–3	Insight Credit Union Arena (630); DeLand, FL
November 22, 2025*; 7:00 pm, ESPN+		VMI; ASUN/SoCon Challenge	W 99–80	3–3	Insight Credit Union Arena (742); DeLand, FL
November 25, 2025*; 7:00 pm, ESPN+		Wright State	L 62–79	3–4	Insight Credit Union Arena (755); DeLand, FL
November 29, 2025*; 2:00 pm, ESPN+		vs. Southern Utah; Urban-Bennett Invitational	L 68–70	3–5	UPMC Events Center (235); Moon Township, PA
November 30, 2025*; 2:00 pm, ESPN+		at Robert Morris; Urban-Bennett Invitational	L 62–80	3–6	UPMC Events Center (1,003); Moon Township, PA
December 2, 2025*; 9:00 pm, MWN		at Grand Canyon	L 45–67	3–7	Global Credit Union Arena (6,703); Phoenix, AZ
December 6, 2025*; 2:00 pm, SECN+		at South Carolina	L 51–82	3–8	Colonial Life Arena (9,055); Columbia, SC
December 15, 2025*; 7:00 pm, ESPN+		Rhodes	W 95–76	4–8	Insight Credit Union Arena (644); DeLand, FL
December 22, 2025*; 9:00 pm, SECN		at Oklahoma	L 54–107	4–9	Lloyd Noble Center (4,646); Norman, OK
ASUN regular season
January 1, 2026; 3:00 pm, ESPN+		at North Alabama	W 70–67	5–9 (1–0)	CB&S Bank Arena (2,056); Florence, AL
January 3, 2026; 2:00 pm, ESPN+		at Central Arkansas	L 73–93	5–10 (1–1)	Farris Center (782); Conway, AR
January 8, 2026; 7:00 pm, ESPN+		Lipscomb	W 91–83	6–10 (2–1)	Insight Credit Union Arena (669); DeLand, FL
January 10, 2026; 2:00 pm, ESPN+		Austin Peay	L 69–81	6–11 (2–2)	Insight Credit Union Arena (755); DeLand, FL
January 15, 2026; 7:00 pm, ESPN+		West Georgia	W 95–86	7–11 (3–2)	Insight Credit Union Arena (780); DeLand, FL
January 17, 2026; 2:00 pm, ESPN+		Queens	L 81–87	7–12 (3–3)	Insight Credit Union Arena (821); DeLand, FL
January 22, 2026; 8:00 pm, ESPN+		at Lipscomb	L 74–79 ^{OT}	7–13 (3–4)	Allen Arena (516); Nashville, TN
January 24, 2026; 5:00 pm, ESPN+		at Austin Peay	L 65–73	7–14 (3–5)	F&M Bank Arena (817); Clarksville, TN
January 29, 2026; 7:00 pm, ESPN+		at North Florida	W 84–77	8–14 (4–5)	UNF Arena (1,476); Jacksonville, FL
January 31, 2026; 2:00 pm, ESPN+		North Alabama	L 66–68	8–15 (4–6)	Insight Credit Union Arena (777); DeLand, FL
February 5, 2026; 7:00 pm, ESPN+		at Bellarmine	L 71–92	8–16 (4–7)	Knights Hall (1,593); Louisville, KY
February 7, 2026; 5:00 pm, ESPN+		at Eastern Kentucky	L 88–100	8–17 (4–8)	Baptist Health Arena (1,670); Richmond, KY
February 11, 2026; 7:00 pm, ESPN+		Jacksonville	W 67–62	9–17 (5–8)	Insight Credit Union Arena (917); DeLand, FL
February 14, 2026; 2:00 pm, ESPN+		at Florida Gulf Coast	L 76–78	9–18 (5–9)	Alico Arena (1,508); Fort Myers, FL
February 19, 2026; 8:00 pm, ESPN+		Central Arkansas	L 76–88	9–19 (5–10)	Insight Credit Union Arena (752); DeLand, FL
February 21, 2026; 3:30 pm, ESPN+		North Florida	W 76–71	10–19 (6–10)	Insight Credit Union Arena (780); DeLand, FL
February 26, 2026; 7:00 pm, ESPN+		at Jacksonville	L 85–89	10–20 (6–11)	Swisher Gymnasium (732); Jacksonville, FL
February 28, 2026; 2:00 pm, ESPN+		Florida Gulf Coast	W 78–63	11–20 (7–11)	Insight Credit Union Arena (682); DeLand, FL
ASUN tournament
March 4, 2026*; 5:00 p.m., ESPN+	(10)	vs. (7) Eastern Kentucky; First round	W 92–76	12–20	UNF Arena; Jacksonville, FL
March 6, 2026*; 5:00 p.m., ESPN+	(10)	vs. (2) Austin Peay; Quarterfinals	L 60–69	12–21	VyStar Veterans Memorial Arena (2,024); Jacksonville, FL
*Non-conference game. ^{#}Rankings from AP Poll. (#) Tournament seedings in parentheses. All times are in Eastern.
