= 2025–26 Austin Peay Governors men's basketball team =

American college basketball season

2025–26 Austin Peay Governors men's basketball

ASUN regular season co-champions
- Conference: Atlantic Sun Conference
- Record: 22–9 (15–3 ASUN)
- Head coach: Corey Gipson (3rd season)
- Associate head coach: Rodney Hamilton; Tim Ward
- Assistant coach: Dugan Lyne
- Home arena: F&M Bank Arena

2025–26 ASUN men's basketball standings
	Conf.				Overall
Team	W		L	PCT	W		L	PCT
Central Arkansas	15	–	3	.833	22	–	12	.647
Austin Peay	15	–	3	.833	22	–	9	.710
Queens †	13	–	5	.722	21	–	13	.618
Lipscomb	12	–	6	.667	19	–	13	.594
Florida Gulf Coast	8	–	10	.444	16	–	18	.471
West Georgia*	8	–	10	.444	15	–	17	.469
Eastern Kentucky	7	–	11	.389	11	–	21	.344
Bellarmine	7	–	11	.389	13	–	19	.406
Jacksonville	7	–	11	.389	12	–	20	.375
Stetson	7	–	11	.389	12	–	21	.364
North Florida	5	–	13	.278	7	–	25	.219
North Alabama	4	–	14	.222	9	–	21	.300
† 2026 ASUN tournament winner * ineligible for the 2026 NCAA tournament due to transition from Division II; As of March 8, 2026

The 2025–26 Austin Peay Governors men's basketball team represented Austin Peay State University during the 2025–26 NCAA Division I men's basketball season. The Governors, led by third-year head coach Corey Gipson, played their home games at F&M Bank Arena in Clarksville, Tennessee, as members of the Atlantic Sun Conference.

With their win over Jacksonville on February 21, the Governors clinched a share of the ASUN regular-season title, their first regular season title since 2008 when they were in the Ohio Valley Conference.

== Previous season ==
The Governors finished the 2024–25 season 14–19, 8–10 in ASUN play, to finish in a tie for seventh place. They defeated North Florida, before falling to North Alabama in the quarterfinals of the ASUN tournament.

== Preseason ==
On October 17, 2025, the ASUN released their preseason polls. Austin Peay was picked to finish fifth in the coaches poll, with one first-place vote, and seventh in the media poll.

=== Preseason rankings ===
ASUN Preseason Coaches Poll
Place	Team	Votes
1	Queens	136 (6)
2	North Alabama	117
3	Eastern Kentucky	111 (2)
4	Florida Gulf Coast	98 (2)
5	Austin Peay	94 (1)
6	Jacksonville	88
7	Lipscomb	77
8	Central Arkansas	57
9	Stetson	56
10	Bellarmine	36
11	North Florida	34 (1)
12	West Georgia	32
(#) first-place votes

ASUN Preseason Media Poll
Place	Team	Votes
1	North Alabama	519 (18)
2	Eastern Kentucky	495 (3)
3	Queens	468 (9)
4	Florida Gulf Coast	465 (12)
5	Lipscomb	408 (9)
6	Jacksonville	381
7	Austin Peay	357
8	Stetson	243
9	North Florida	192
10	Bellarmine	189
11	Central Arkansas	174
12	West Georgia	126
(#) first-place votes

=== Preseason All-ASUN Team ===
Preseason All-ASUN Team
Player	Year	Position
Tate McCubbin	Sophomore	Guard/Forward

== Roster ==
2025–26 Austin Peay Governors men's basketball team
Players
Coaches

Pos.	#	Name	Height	Weight	Year	Previous school	Hometown
G/F	0	Tate McCubbin	6 ft 8 in (2.03 m)	174 lb (79 kg)	So	Battle High School	Columbia, Missouri
PG	1	Zyree Collins	6 ft 0 in (1.83 m)	187 lb (85 kg)	Fr	St. Mary's High School	St. Louis, Missouri
G	2	Tyler Wagner	6 ft 5 in (1.96 m)	197 lb (89 kg)	Fr	Champlin Park High School	Brooklyn Park, Minnesota
PG	3	Matt Enright	6 ft 2 in (1.88 m)	179 lb (81 kg)	Sr	UMSL	St. Louis, Missouri
F	5	Rashaud Marshall	6 ft 8 in (2.03 m)	226 lb (103 kg)	Jr	Arkansas State	Blytheville, Arkansas
F	7	Creighton Morisch	6 ft 10 in (2.08 m)	229 lb (104 kg)	GS	Sioux Falls	Spirit Lake, Iowa
PG	10	Terrell Gaines	5 ft 8 in (1.73 m)	155 lb (70 kg)	So	Liberty High School	West Plains, Missouri
PG	12	Anton Brookshire	6 ft 2 in (1.88 m)	174 lb (79 kg)	RS Sr	Iona	Milwaukee, Wisconsin
PG	20	Quan Lax	6 ft 2 in (1.88 m)	188 lb (85 kg)	RS Sr	Freed–Hardeman	Bolivar, Tennessee
G/F	22	Travis Torain	6 ft 8 in (2.03 m)	203 lb (92 kg)	So	Panola College	Surprise, Arizona
PG	23	Ja'Corey Robinson	6 ft 6 in (1.98 m)	211 lb (96 kg)	Fr	Highland Park High School	Topeka, Kansas
PG	24	Hansel Enmanuel	6 ft 6 in (1.98 m)	185 lb (84 kg)	Sr	Northwestern State	Los Mina, Dominican Republic
F	32	Collin Parker	6 ft 8 in (2.03 m)	227 lb (103 kg)	GS	Columbia College	Montgomery City, Missouri

Head coach

- Corey Gipson (Austin Peay)

Assistant coach(es)

- Rodney Hamilton (Georgia State)
- Tim Ward (Central Methodist)
- Dugan Lyne (Austin Peay)

Legend

- (C) Team captain
- (S) Suspended
- (I) Ineligible
- (W) Walk-on
- Injured
- Current redshirt

Roster
Last update: December 2, 2025

== Schedule and results ==
Date time, TV	Rank^{#}	Opponent^{#}	Result	Record	Site (attendance) city, state
Exhibition
October 17, 2025*; 6:00 pm		at Southern Illinois	L 79–84	–	Banterra Center (2,336); Carbondale, IL
October 28, 2025*; 7:00 pm		Middle Tennessee	W 66–55	–	F&M Bank Arena (1,177); Clarksville, TN
Non-conference regular season
November 3, 2025*; 7:30 pm, ESPN+		Bryan	W 128–47	1–0	F&M Bank Arena (1,416); Clarksville, TN
November 8, 2025*; 3:00 pm, MWN		at Air Force	W 74–54	2–0	Clune Arena (1,374); Air Force Academy, CO
November 11, 2025*; 7:30 pm, MWN		at Wyoming	L 65–79	2–1	Arena-Auditorium (3,249); Laramie, WY
November 15, 2025*; 1:00 pm, ESPN+		at UNC Greensboro; ASUN/SoCon Challenge	W 69–63	3–1	Bodford Arena (906); Greensboro, NC
November 18, 2025*; 7:00 pm, SECN+		at Ole Miss; Acrisure Series on-campus game	L 65–72	3–2	SJB Pavilion (7,473); University, MS
November 21, 2025*; 7:00 pm, ESPN+		at Tulsa; Acrisure Series on-campus game	L 75–84	3–3	Reynolds Center (2,702); Tulsa, OK
November 25, 2025*; 7:00 pm, ESPN+		Northern Illinois; Acrisure Series on-campus game	W 77–59	4–3	F&M Bank Arena (1,833); Clarksville, TN
December 3, 2025*; 6:00 pm, ESPN+		at Kent State	L 84–96	4–4	MAC Center (1,642); Kent, OH
December 7, 2025*; 1:00 pm, ESPN+		at UT Rio Grande Valley	L 50–63	4–5	UTRGV Fieldhouse (930); Edinburg, TX
December 12, 2025*; 7:00 pm, ESPN+		East Tennessee State	W 76–75	5–5	F&M Bank Arena (2,101); Clarksville, TN
December 21, 2025*; 5:00 pm, SLN		at Kansas City	Cancelled due to unexpected passing of Austin Peay's bus driver		Swinney Recreation Center; Kansas City, MO
December 28, 2025*; 4:30 pm, ESPN+		Fisk	W 110–59	6–5	F&M Bank Arena (1,846); Clarksville, TN
ASUN regular season
January 1, 2026; 7:00 pm, ESPN+		North Florida	W 102–83	7–5 (1–0)	F&M Bank Arena (1,091); Clarksville, TN
January 3, 2026; 4:00 pm, ESPN+		Jacksonville	W 71–68	8–5 (2–0)	F&M Bank Arena (1,821); Clarksville, TN
January 8, 2026; 6:00 pm, ESPN+		at Florida Gulf Coast	W 82–71	9–5 (3–0)	Alico Arena (1,762); Fort Myers, FL
January 10, 2026; 1:00 pm, ESPN+		at Stetson	W 81–69	10–5 (4–0)	Edmunds Center (755); DeLand, FL
January 15, 2026; 7:00 pm, ESPN+		Eastern Kentucky	W 74–72	11–5 (5–0)	F&M Bank Arena (2,782); Clarksville, TN
January 17, 2026; 6:00 pm, ESPN+		at Lipscomb	L 78–82	11–6 (5–1)	Allen Arena (2,837); Nashville, TN
January 22, 2026; 7:00 pm, ESPN+		Florida Gulf Coast	W 83–62	12–6 (6–1)	F&M Bank Arena (789); Clarksville, TN
January 24, 2026; 4:00 pm, ESPN+		Stetson	W 73–65	13–6 (7–1)	F&M Bank Arena (817); Clarksville, TN
January 28, 2026; 6:00 pm, ESPN+		at Eastern Kentucky	W 90–82	14–6 (8–1)	Baptist Health Arena (1,244); Richmond, KY
January 31, 2026; 3:30 pm, ESPN+		at West Georgia	W 81–78	15–6 (9–1)	The Coliseum (1,173); Carrollton, GA
February 4, 2026; 7:00 pm, ESPN+		Lipscomb	W 87–76	16–6 (10–1)	F&M Bank Arena (3,397); Clarksville, TN
February 7, 2026; 4:00 pm, ESPN+		North Alabama	W 91–62	17–6 (11–1)	F&M Bank Arena (4,136); Clarksville, TN
February 11, 2026; 6:00 pm, ESPN+		at Queens	W 95–87	18–6 (12–1)	Curry Arena (423); Charlotte, NC
February 14, 2026; 4:30 pm, ESPN+		Bellarmine	W 90–70	19–6 (13–1)	F&M Bank Arena (2,187); Clarksville, TN
February 19, 2026; 6:00 pm, ESPN+		at North Florida	W 77–76	20–6 (14–1)	UNF Arena (1,297); Jacksonville, FL
February 21, 2026; 6:00 pm, ESPN+		at Jacksonville	W 65–61	21–6 (15–1)	Swisher Gymnasium (872); Jacksonville, FL
February 25, 2026; 7:30 pm, ESPN+		Central Arkansas	L 88–93	21–7 (15–2)	F&M Bank Arena (4,026); Clarksville, TN
February 28, 2026; 1:00 pm, ESPN+		at Bellarmine	L 97–111	21–8 (15–3)	Knights Hall (1,785); Louisville, KY
ASUN tournament
March 6, 2026; 4:00 pm, ESPN+	(2)	vs. (10) Stetson; Quarterfinals	W 69–60	22–8	VyStar Veterans Memorial Arena (2,024); Jacksonville, FL
March 7, 2026; 6:30 pm, ESPN+	(2)	vs. (3) Queens; Semifinals	L 83–90	22–9	VyStar Veterans Memorial Arena (2,052); Jacksonville, FL
*Non-conference game. ^{#}Rankings from AP Poll. (#) Tournament seedings in parentheses. All times are in Central.
