= 2025–26 Bellarmine Knights men's basketball team =

American college basketball season

2025–26 Bellarmine Knights men's basketball
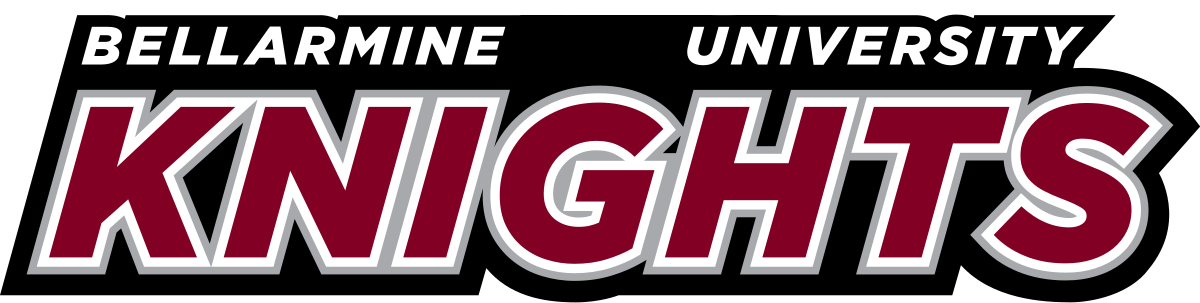
- Conference: Atlantic Sun Conference
- Record: 13–19 (7–11 ASUN)
- Head coach: Doug Davenport (1st season)
- Assistant coaches: Al Davis; Patrick Reilingh; Winston Yergler; Scooter Galloway
- Home arena: Knights Hall

2025–26 ASUN men's basketball standings
| | Conf. | | | | Overall |
| Team | W | | L | PCT | W | | L | PCT |
|---|---|---|---|---|---|---|---|---|
| Central Arkansas | 15 | – | 3 | .833 | 20 | – | 11 | .645 |
| Austin Peay | 15 | – | 3 | .833 | 21 | – | 8 | .724 |
| Queens | 13 | – | 5 | .722 | 18 | – | 13 | .581 |
| Lipscomb | 12 | – | 6 | .667 | 19 | – | 12 | .613 |
| Florida Gulf Coast | 8 | – | 10 | .444 | 15 | – | 17 | .469 |
| West Georgia* | 8 | – | 10 | .444 | 15 | – | 16 | .484 |
| Eastern Kentucky | 7 | – | 11 | .389 | 11 | – | 21 | .344 |
| Bellarmine | 7 | – | 11 | .389 | 13 | – | 18 | .419 |
| Jacksonville | 7 | – | 11 | .389 | 12 | – | 20 | .375 |
| Stetson | 7 | – | 11 | .389 | 12 | – | 20 | .375 |
| North Florida | 5 | – | 13 | .278 | 7 | – | 25 | .219 |
| North Alabama | 4 | – | 14 | .222 | 9 | – | 21 | .300 |
† 2026 ASUN tournament winner * ineligible for the 2026 NCAA tournament due to transition from Division II; As of March 4, 2026

The 2025–26 Bellarmine Knights men's basketball team represented Bellarmine University during the 2025–26 NCAA Division I men's basketball season. The Knights, led by first year head coach Doug Davenport, played their home games at Knights Hall located in Louisville, Kentucky as members of the Atlantic Sun Conference.

== Previous season ==
The Knights finished the 2024–25 season 5–26, 2–16 in ASUN play to finish in 12th place, failing to qualify for the ASUN tournament.

On March 9, 2025, head coach Scott Davenport announced his retirement. The school announced that Scott's son, assistant coach Doug Davenport, would be the team's new head coach.

== Preseason ==
On October 17, 2025, the ASUN released their preseason polls. Bellarmine was picked to finish tenth in the coaches and media poll.

=== Preseason rankings ===
ASUN Preseason Coaches Poll
| Place | Team | Votes |
|---|---|---|
| 1 | Queens | 136 (6) |
| 2 | North Alabama | 117 |
| 3 | Eastern Kentucky | 111 (2) |
| 4 | Florida Gulf Coast | 98 (2) |
| 5 | Austin Peay | 94 (1) |
| 6 | Jacksonville | 88 |
| 7 | Lipscomb | 77 |
| 8 | Central Arkansas | 57 |
| 9 | Stetson | 56 |
| 10 | Bellarmine | 36 |
| 11 | North Florida | 34 (1) |
| 12 | West Georgia | 32 |
(#) first-place votes

ASUN Preseason Media Poll
| Place | Team | Votes |
|---|---|---|
| 1 | North Alabama | 519 (18) |
| 2 | Eastern Kentucky | 495 (3) |
| 3 | Queens | 468 (9) |
| 4 | Florida Gulf Coast | 465 (12) |
| 5 | Lipscomb | 408 (9) |
| 6 | Jacksonville | 381 |
| 7 | Austin Peay | 357 |
| 8 | Stetson | 243 |
| 9 | North Florida | 192 |
| 10 | Bellarmine | 189 |
| 11 | Central Arkansas | 174 |
| 12 | West Georgia | 126 |
(#) first-place votes

=== Preseason All-ASUN Team ===
No players were named to the All-ASUN team.

== Roster ==
2025–26 Bellarmine Knights men's basketball team
Players
Coaches

| Pos. | # | Name | Height | Weight | Year | Previous school | Hometown |
|---|---|---|---|---|---|---|---|
| G | 0 | Tommy Clark | 6 ft 3 in (1.91 m) | 175 lb (79 kg) | Fr | Kings High School | Kings Mills, Ohio |
| G/F | 1 | Ant McAfee | 6 ft 6 in (1.98 m) | 170 lb (77 kg) | Fr | Warren Central High School | Peoria, Illinois |
| G | 2 | Tyler Doyle | 6 ft 5 in (1.96 m) | 185 lb (84 kg) | So | Lexington Catholic High School | Lexington, Kentucky |
| G | 4 | Grant Neal | 6 ft 3 in (1.91 m) | 180 lb (82 kg) | RS Fr | North Oldham High School | Prospect, Kentucky |
| G | 5 | Myles Watkins | 6 ft 3 in (1.91 m) | 185 lb (84 kg) | Sr | Pasadena City College | Frisco, Texas |
| F | 7 | Donovan Hunter | 6 ft 8 in (2.03 m) | 200 lb (91 kg) | Jr | Kent State | Columbus, Ohio |
| G | 8 | Kenyon Goodin | 6 ft 3 in (1.91 m) | 190 lb (86 kg) | RS So | Collins High School | Shelbyville, Kentucky |
| G | 10 | Grant Whitaker | 6 ft 4 in (1.93 m) | 185 lb (84 kg) | RS So | Murray High School | Murray, Kentucky |
| F | 11 | Brian Waddell | 6 ft 7 in (2.01 m) | 195 lb (88 kg) | RS Sr | Purdue | Carmel, Indiana |
| F | 14 | Dominique Murphy | 6 ft 5 in (1.96 m) | 180 lb (82 kg) | Fr | Central High School | East Chicago, Indiana |
| F | 15 | Luke Anderson | 6 ft 8 in (2.03 m) | 200 lb (91 kg) | RS So | North Oldham High School | Goshen, Kentucky |
| G | 22 | Darrius Bolden | 6 ft 1 in (1.85 m) | 185 lb (84 kg) | GS | Wisconsin–Stevens Point | Milwaukee, Wisconsin |
| F | 23 | Sam Donald | 6 ft 8 in (2.03 m) | 195 lb (88 kg) | Fr | Columbia High School | Columbia, Illinois |
| F | 24 | Michael Wilson Jr. | 6 ft 6 in (1.98 m) | 195 lb (88 kg) | So | North Greenville | Charlotte, North Carolina |
| F | 32 | Jack Karasinski | 6 ft 7 in (2.01 m) | 215 lb (98 kg) | RS Sr | William & Mary | Grand Rapids, Michigan |
| C | 44 | Jacob Wassler | 6 ft 11 in (2.11 m) | 230 lb (104 kg) | RS Fr | St. Xavier High School | Cincinnati, Ohio |

Head coach

- Doug Davenport (Bellarmine)

Assistant coach(es)

- Al Davis (Bellarmine)
- Patrick Reilingh (Louisville)
- Winston Yergler (Purdue)
- Scooter Galloway (Bellarmine)

Legend

- (C) Team captain
- (S) Suspended
- (I) Ineligible
- (W) Walk-on
- Injured
- Current redshirt

Roster
Last update: October 19, 2025

== Schedule and results ==
| Date time, TV | Rank^{#} | Opponent^{#} | Result | Record | Site (attendance) city, state |
Exhibition
| October 29, 2025*; 7:00 p.m. | | Centre | W 83–57 | – | Knights Hall (792); Louisville, KY |
Non-conference regular season
| November 3, 2025*; 7:30 p.m., SECN+ | | at Georgia | L 59–104 | 0–1 | Stegeman Coliseum (6,187); Athens, GA |
| November 8, 2025*; 8:00 p.m., ESPN+ | | at Kansas State | L 71–98 | 0–2 | Bramlage Coliseum (8,040); Manhattan, KS |
| November 12, 2025*; 7:00 p.m., ESPN+ | | Hanover | W 94−55 | 1−2 | Knights Hall (724); Louisville, KY |
| November 15, 2025*; 2:00 p.m., ESPN+ | | Wofford; SoCon/ASUN Challenge | L 86–94 | 1–3 | Knights Hall (829); Louisville, KY |
| November 19, 2025*; 7:00 p.m., ACCNX/ESPN+ | | at Notre Dame | L 79–86 | 1–4 | Joyce Center (3,676); South Bend, IN |
| November 24, 2025*; 7:00 p.m., ESPN+ | | at The Citadel; The Citadel MTE | W 70–58 | 2–4 | McAlister Field House (871); Charleston, SC |
| November 25, 2025*; 7:00 p.m. | | vs. Houston Christian; The Citadel MTE | W 74–69 | 3–4 | McAlister Field House (203); Charleston, SC |
| November 29, 2025*; 3:00 p.m. | | at Northern Illinois | Canceled due to inclement weather | | Convocation Center; DeKalb, IL |
| December 3, 2025*; 7:00 p.m., ESPN+ | | Midway | W 99–60 | 4–4 | Knights Hall (1,283); Louisville, KY |
| December 6, 2025*; 3:00 p.m., ESPN+ | | at Murray State | L 68–81 | 4–5 | CFSB Center (4,762); Murray, KY |
| December 13, 2025*; 2:00 p.m., ESPN+ | | Northern Kentucky | L 76–80 | 4–6 | Knights Hall (1,227); Louisville, KY |
| December 17, 2025*; 7:00 p.m., ESPN+ | | Chattanooga | W 79–64 | 5–6 | Knights Hall (1,192); Louisville, KY |
| December 23, 2025*; 1:00 p.m., SECN+/ESPN+ | | at Kentucky | L 85–99 | 5–7 | Rupp Arena (19,706); Lexington, KY |
ASUN regular season
| January 1, 2026; 7:00 p.m., ESPN+ | | at West Georgia | L 85–87 | 5–8 (0–1) | The Coliseum (507); Carrollton, GA |
| January 3, 2026; 3:00 p.m., ESPN+ | | at Queens | L 76–98 | 5–9 (0–2) | Curry Arena (450); Charlotte, NC |
| January 8, 2026; 7:00 p.m., ESPN+ | | Central Arkansas | W 84–78 ^{OT} | 6–9 (1–2) | Knights Hall (1,752); Louisville, KY |
| January 10, 2026; 2:00 p.m., ESPN+ | | North Alabama | L 73–82 | 6–10 (1–3) | Knights Hall (1,373); Louisville, KY |
| January 15, 2026; 8:00 p.m., ESPN+ | | at Lipscomb | L 71–81 | 6–11 (1–4) | Allen Arena (977); Nashville, TN |
| January 17, 2026; 7:00 p.m., ESPN+ | | at Eastern Kentucky | L 69–89 | 6–12 (1–5) | Baptist Health Arena (1,511); Richmond, KY |
| January 22, 2026; 7:00 p.m., ESPN+ | | at Jacksonville | W 77–70 | 7–12 (2–5) | Swisher Gymnasium (762); Jacksonville, FL |
| January 24, 2026; 2:00 p.m., ESPN+ | | at North Florida | L 114–117 ^{OT} | 7–13 (2–6) | UNF Arena (1,155); Jacksonville, FL |
| January 28, 2026; 7:00 p.m., ESPN+ | | West Georgia | W 77–74 | 8–13 (3–6) | Knights Hall (1,827); Louisville, KY |
| January 31, 2026; 2:00 p.m., ESPN+ | | Queens | W 78–75 | 9–13 (4–6) | Knights Hall (1,473); Louisville, KY |
| February 5, 2026; 7:00 p.m., ESPN+ | | Stetson | W 92–71 | 10–13 (5–6) | Knights Hall (1,593); Louisville, KY |
| February 7, 2026; 2:00 p.m., ESPN+ | | Florida Gulf Coast | W 81–65 | 11–13 (6–6) | Knights Hall (1,528); Louisville, KY |
| February 11, 2026; 7:30 p.m., ESPN+ | | at Central Arkansas | L 76–84 | 11–14 (6–7) | Farris Center (1,165); Conway, AR |
| February 14, 2026; 5:30 p.m., ESPN+ | | at Austin Peay | L 70–90 | 11–15 (6–8) | F&M Bank Arena (2,187); Clarksville, TN |
| February 18, 2026; 7:30 p.m., ESPN+ | | Lipscomb | L 72–75 | 11–16 (6–9) | Knights Hall (1,782); Louisville, KY |
| February 21, 2026; 7:00 p.m., ESPN+ | | Eastern Kentucky | L 92–95 | 11–17 (6–10) | Knights Hall (1,921); Louisville, KY |
| February 25, 2026; 8:45 p.m., ESPN+ | | at North Alabama | L 68–73 | 11–18 (6–11) | CB&S Bank Arena (2,251); Florence, AL |
| February 28, 2025; 2:00 p.m., ESPN+ | | Austin Peay | W 111–97 | 12–18 (7–11) | Knights Hall (1,785); Louisville, KY |
ASUN tournament
| March 4, 2026; 12:00 p.m., ESPN+ | (8) | vs. (9) Jacksonville; First round | W 82–79 | 13–18 | UNF Arena; Jacksonville, FL |
| March 6, 2026; 12:00 p.m., ESPN+ | (8) | vs. (1) Central Arkansas; Quarterfinals | L 73–86 | 13–19 | VyStar Veterans Memorial Arena; Jacksonville, FL |
*Non-conference game. ^{#}Rankings from AP Poll. (#) Tournament seedings in parentheses. All times are in Eastern.
