= 2025–26 West Georgia Wolves men's basketball team =

American college basketball season

2025–26 West Georgia Wolves men's basketball
- Conference: Atlantic Sun Conference
- Record: 15–17 (8–10 ASUN)
- Head coach: Dave Moore (8th season)
- Assistant coaches: Andy Young; Mark Schult; Willie Evans
- Home arena: The Coliseum

2025–26 ASUN men's basketball standings
	Conf.				Overall
Team	W		L	PCT	W		L	PCT
Central Arkansas	15	–	3	.833	22	–	12	.647
Austin Peay	15	–	3	.833	22	–	9	.710
Queens †	13	–	5	.722	21	–	14	.600
Lipscomb	12	–	6	.667	19	–	13	.594
Florida Gulf Coast	8	–	10	.444	16	–	18	.471
West Georgia*	8	–	10	.444	15	–	17	.469
Eastern Kentucky	7	–	11	.389	11	–	21	.344
Bellarmine	7	–	11	.389	13	–	19	.406
Jacksonville	7	–	11	.389	12	–	20	.375
Stetson	7	–	11	.389	12	–	21	.364
North Florida	5	–	13	.278	7	–	25	.219
North Alabama	4	–	14	.222	9	–	21	.300
† 2026 ASUN tournament winner * ineligible for the 2026 NCAA tournament due to transition from Division II

The 2025–26 West Georgia Wolves men's basketball team represented the University of West Georgia during the 2025–26 NCAA Division I men's basketball season. The Wolves, led by eighth-year head coach Dave Moore, played their home games at The Coliseum in Carrollton, Georgia as second-year members of the Atlantic Sun Conference.

This season marked West Georgia's second year of a three-year transition period from Division II to Division I. As a result, the Wolves are not currently eligible to participate in the NCAA tournament until the 2027–28 season.

On June 26, 2025, West Georgia announced that the 2025–26 season would be the last season for the team in the Atlantic Sun, as they will join the United Athletic Conference on July 1, 2026.

== Previous season ==
The Wolves finished the 2024–25 season 6–25, 4–14 in ASUN play to finish in 11th place. They failed to qualify for the ASUN tournament.

== Preseason ==
On October 17, 2025, the Atlantic Sun released their preseason media poll. West Georgia was picked to finish last in the conference.

=== Preseason rankings ===
Atlantic Sun Preseason Media Poll
Place	Team	Points
1	North Alabama	519 (18)
2	Eastern Kentucky	495 (3)
3	Queens (NC)	468 (9)
4	Florida Gulf Coast	465 (12)
5	Lipscomb	408 (9)
6	Jacksonville	381
7	Austin Peay	357
8	Stetson	243
9	North Florida	192
10	Bellarmine	189
11	Central Arkansas	174
12	West Georgia	126
(#) first-place votes

== Roster ==
2025–26 West Georgia Wolves men's basketball team
Players
Coaches

Pos.	#	Name	Height	Weight	Year	Previous school	Hometown
G	1	Brady Hardewig	6 ft 2 in (1.88 m)	195 lb (88 kg)	RS So	Turpin High School	Cincinnati, Ohio
G	2	Chas Lewless	6 ft 2 in (1.88 m)	175 lb (79 kg)	RS Fr	San Diego	Detroit, Michigan
F	3	Xavier Shegog	6 ft 6 in (1.98 m)	211 lb (96 kg)	RS Fr	Mount Vernon School	Nashville, Tennessee
F	4	Shelton Williams-Dryden	6 ft 6 in (1.98 m)	220 lb (100 kg)	Sr	Milwaukee Area Tech	Milwaukee, Wisconsin
G/F	5	JaVar Daniel	6 ft 10 in (2.08 m)	215 lb (98 kg)	Jr	Austin Peay	Memphis, Tennessee
G	6	Matija Žužić	6 ft 7 in (2.01 m)	194 lb (88 kg)	Sr	UT Martin	Belgrade, Serbia
G/F	9	Micah Smith	6 ft 7 in (2.01 m)	205 lb (93 kg)	So	Georgia Southern	Tyrone, Georgia
G	10	Josh Smith	6 ft 3 in (1.91 m)	182 lb (83 kg)	Jr	NC Central	Chicago, Illinois
G/F	11	Kolten Griffin	6 ft 6 in (1.98 m)	202 lb (92 kg)	Sr	North Central Missouri	St. Joseph, Missouri
G	12	Eric Baldassarre	6 ft 4 in (1.93 m)	172 lb (78 kg)	RS Fr	IMG Academy	Lancaster, Pennsylvania
G	14	Nate Jones	6 ft 2 in (1.88 m)	190 lb (86 kg)	GS	Reinhardt	Carrollton, Georgia
G	20	Max Young	6 ft 3 in (1.91 m)	190 lb (86 kg)	RS Fr	Central High School	Carrollton, Georgia
PF	22	Kenneth Chime	6 ft 9 in (2.06 m)	214 lb (97 kg)	RS Fr	The McCallie School	Enugu, Nigeria
G	23	Malcolm Noel	5 ft 11 in (1.8 m)	175 lb (79 kg)	Sr	Covenant College	Atlanta, Georgia
F	25	Maddox Fowles	6 ft 7 in (2.01 m)	206 lb (93 kg)	Fr	Western High School	Miami Gardens, Florida
G	30	Cameron Merritt	5 ft 11 in (1.8 m)	172 lb (78 kg)	RS So	Carrollton High School	Carrollton, Georgia

Head coach

- Dave Moore (Bethel (TN))

Assistant coach(es)

- Andy Young (West Georgia)
- Mark Schult (Wittenberg)
- Willie Evans (West Georgia)

Legend

- (C) Team captain
- (S) Suspended
- (I) Ineligible
- (W) Walk-on
- Injured
- Current redshirt

Roster
Last update: November 1, 2025

== Schedule and results ==
Date time, TV	Rank^{#}	Opponent^{#}	Result	Record	Site (attendance) city, state
Exhibition
October 26, 2025*; 2:00 p.m.		at Kennesaw State	L 73–86	–	Convocation Center; Kennesaw, GA
Non-conference regular season
November 3, 2025*; 8:00 p.m., B1G+		at Nebraska	L 53–86	0–1	Pinnacle Bank Arena (13,555); Lincoln, NE
November 7, 2025*; 7:00 p.m., ESPN+		Huntingdon	W 120–83	1–1	The Coliseum (824); Carrollton, GA
November 10, 2025*; 10:00 p.m., B1G+		at No. 15 UCLA	L 62–83	1–2	Pauley Pavilion (4,133); Los Angeles, CA
November 14, 2025*; 7:00 p.m., ESPN+		The Citadel; SoCon-ASUN Challenge	W 100–92	2–2	The Coliseum (694); Carrollton, GA
November 17, 2025*; 7:00 p.m., ESPN+		at Tennessee Tech	W 61–59	3–2	Eblen Center (648); Cookeville, TN
November 21, 2025*; 7:00 p.m., ESPN+		USC Upstate	W 72–64	4–2	The Coliseum (522); Carrollton, GA
November 23, 2025*; 2:00 p.m., ACCNX		at Georgia Tech	L 66–82	4–3	McCamish Pavilion (4,772); Atlanta, GA
December 1, 2025*; 7:00 p.m., ESPN+		at Troy	W 93–89 ^{2OT}	5–3	Trojan Arena (2,223); Troy, AL
December 6, 2025*; 2:00 p.m., ESPN+		Tennessee Tech	L 59–87	5–4	The Coliseum (567); Carrollton, GA
December 13, 2025*; 7:00 p.m., ESPN+		Georgia Southern	L 85–91	5–5	The Coliseum (686); Carrollton, GA
December 17, 2025*; 7:00 p.m., ESPN+		Brewton–Parker	W 70–49	6–5	The Coliseum (403); Carrollton, GA
December 22, 2025*; 2:00 p.m., SECN+		at No. 23 Georgia	L 74–103	6–6	Stegeman Coliseum (10,523); Athens, GA
ASUN regular season
January 1, 2026; 7:00 p.m., ESPN+		Bellarmine	W 87–85	7–6 (1–0)	The Coliseum (507); Carrollton, GA
January 3, 2026; 2:00 p.m., ESPN+		Eastern Kentucky	W 88–76	8–6 (2–0)	The Coliseum (714); Carrollton, GA
January 8, 2026; 8:00 p.m., ESPN+		at North Florida	W 85–73	9–6 (3–0)	UNF Arena (1,264); Jacksonville, FL
January 10, 2026; 3:00 p.m., ESPN+		at Jacksonville	L 43–75	9–7 (3–1)	Swisher Gymnasium (677); Jacksonville, FL
January 15, 2026; 7:00 p.m., ESPN+		at Stetson	L 86–95	9–8 (3–2)	Insight Credit Union Arena (780); DeLand, FL
January 17, 2026; 2:00 p.m., ESPN+		at Florida Gulf Coast	L 72–90	9–9 (3–3)	Alico Arena (1,693); Fort Myers, FL
January 22, 2026; 7:00 p.m., ESPN+		Central Arkansas	L 65–86	9–10 (3–4)	The Coliseum (1,274); Carrollton, GA
January 24, 2026; 4:30 p.m., ESPN+		Queens	W 74–66	10–10 (4–4)	The Coliseum (812); Carrollton, GA
January 28, 2026; 7:00 p.m., ESPN+		at Bellarmine	L 74–77	10–11 (4–5)	Knights Hall (1,827); Louisville, KY
January 31, 2026; 4:30 p.m., ESPN+		Austin Peay	L 78–81	10–12 (4–6)	The Coliseum (1,173); Carrollton, GA
February 5, 2026; 7:00 p.m., ESPN+		North Florida	L 73–81	10–13 (4–7)	The Coliseum (592); Carrollton, GA
February 7, 2026; 2:00 p.m., ESPN+		Jacksonville	W 87–73	11–13 (5–7)	The Coliseum (572); Carrollton, GA
February 11, 2026; 7:00 p.m., ESPN+		at North Alabama	W 82–73	12–13 (6–7)	CB&S Bank Arena (2,365); Florence, AL
February 14, 2026; 2:00 p.m., ESPN+		at Central Arkansas	L 62–79	12–14 (6–8)	Farris Center (1,583); Conway, AR
February 18, 2026; 7:00 p.m., ESPN+		at Eastern Kentucky	L 80–81 ^{OT}	12–15 (6–9)	Baptist Health Arena (1,379); Richmond, KY
February 21, 2026; 3:00 p.m., ESPN+		at Queens	L 84–91	12–16 (6–10)	Curry Arena (475); Charlotte, NC
February 25, 2026; 7:00 p.m., ESPN+		Lipscomb	W 84–77	13–16 (7–10)	The Coliseum (1,447); Carrollton, GA
February 28, 2026; 2:00 p.m., ESPN+		North Alabama	W 75–63	14–16 (8–10)	The Coliseum (1,046); Carrollton, GA
ASUN tournament
March 4, 2026; 7:30 p.m., ESPN+	(6)	vs. (11) North Florida; First round	W 93–85	15–16	Swisher Gymnasium (690); Jacksonville, FL
March 6, 2026; 7:30 p.m., ESPN+	(6)	vs. (3) Queens; Quarterfinals	L 63–71	15–17	VyStar Veterans Memorial Arena (2,024); Jacksonville, FL
*Non-conference game. ^{#}Rankings from AP Poll. (#) Tournament seedings in parentheses. All times are in Eastern.
