= 2026 Atlantic Sun men's basketball tournament =

American college basketball postseason tournament

2026 ASUN men's basketball tournament
- Classification: Division I
- Season: 2025–26
- Teams: 12
- Site: UNF Arena/Swisher Gymnasium; VyStar Veterans Memorial Arena; Jacksonville, Florida
- Champions: Queens (1st title)
- Winning coach: Grant Leonard (1st title)
- MVP: Nasir Mann (Queens)
- Television: ESPN+, ESPN2

2025–26 ASUN men's basketball standings
	Conf.				Overall
Team	W		L	PCT	W		L	PCT
Central Arkansas	15	–	3	.833	22	–	12	.647
Austin Peay	15	–	3	.833	22	–	9	.710
Queens †	13	–	5	.722	21	–	14	.600
Lipscomb	12	–	6	.667	19	–	13	.594
Florida Gulf Coast	8	–	10	.444	16	–	18	.471
West Georgia*	8	–	10	.444	15	–	17	.469
Eastern Kentucky	7	–	11	.389	11	–	21	.344
Bellarmine	7	–	11	.389	13	–	19	.406
Jacksonville	7	–	11	.389	12	–	20	.375
Stetson	7	–	11	.389	12	–	21	.364
North Florida	5	–	13	.278	7	–	25	.219
North Alabama	4	–	14	.222	9	–	21	.300
† 2026 ASUN tournament winner * ineligible for the 2026 NCAA tournament due to transition from Division II

The 2026 Atlantic Sun men's basketball tournament was the conference postseason tournament for the Atlantic Sun Conference (ASUN). The tournament was the 47th year the league has conducted a postseason tournament. The tournament was held March 4–8, 2026; first-round games were played at UNF Arena and Swisher Gymnasium, with all remaining games being played at VyStar Veterans Memorial Arena in Jacksonville, Florida. The winner, Queens, received the conference's automatic bid to the 2026 NCAA Tournament.

== Seeds ==
All 12 members of the conference participated in the tournament. The top four seeds earned a bye to the quarterfinals.

The tiebreakers used by the ASUN are: 1) head-to-head record of teams with identical record, 2) comparing tied teams' win percentage against other teams in the conference, starting from the top team and descending until an advantage is gained, and 3) NCAA NET Rankings available on day following the conclusion of ASUN regular season play.

Seed	School	Conference	Tiebreaker 1	Tiebreaker 2
1	Central Arkansas	15–3	1–0 vs. Austin Peay	
2	Austin Peay	15–3	0–1 vs. Central Arkansas	
3	Queens	13–5		
4	Lipscomb	12–6		
5	Florida Gulf Coast	8–10	1–0 vs. West Georgia	
6	West Georgia	8–10	0–1 vs. Florida Gulf Coast	
7	Eastern Kentucky	7–11	3–1 vs. BELL/JU/STET	
8	Bellarmine	7–11	2–2 vs. EKU/JU/STET	1–0 vs. Jacksonville
9	Jacksonville	7–11	2–2 vs. EKU/BELL/STET	0–1 vs. Bellarmine
10	Stetson	7–11	1–3 vs. EKU/BELL/JU	
11	North Florida	5–13		
12	North Alabama	4–14		

== Schedule ==
Game	Time	Matchup	Score	Television
First round – Wednesday, March 4 – UNF Arena/Swisher Gymnasium
1	12:00 p.m.	No. 8 Bellarmine vs No. 9 Jacksonville	82–79	ESPN+
2	2:30 p.m.	No. 5 Florida Gulf Coast vs No. 12 North Alabama	69–58	ESPN+
3	5:00 p.m.	No. 7 Eastern Kentucky vs No. 10 Stetson	76–92	ESPN+
4	7:30 p.m.	No. 6 West Georgia vs No. 11 North Florida	93–85	ESPN+
Quarterfinals – Friday, March 6
5	12:00 p.m.	No. 1 Central Arkansas vs. No. 8 Bellarmine	86–73	ESPN+
6	2:30 p.m.	No. 4 Lipscomb vs. No. 5 Florida Gulf Coast	53–77	ESPN+
7	5:00 p.m.	No. 2 Austin Peay vs. No. 10 Stetson	69–60	ESPN+
8	7:30 p.m.	No. 3 Queens vs. No. 6 West Georgia	71–63	ESPN+
Semifinals – Saturday, March 7
9	5:00 p.m.	No. 1 Central Arkansas vs. No. 5 Florida Gulf Coast	73–63	ESPN+
10	7:30 p.m.	No. 2 Austin Peay vs. No. 3 Queens	83–90	ESPN+
Championship – Sunday, March 8
11	2:00 p.m.	No. 1 Central Arkansas vs. No. 3 Queens	93–98^{OT}	ESPN2
Game times in ET. Rankings denote tournament seed

== Bracket ==
First round Wednesday, March 4
8	Bellarmine	82
9	Jacksonville	79
5	Florida Gulf Coast	69
12	North Alabama	58
7	Eastern Kentucky	76
10	Stetson	92
6	West Georgia	93
11	North Florida	85

Quarterfinals; Friday, March 6
1	Central Arkansas	86
8	Bellarmine	73
4	Lipscomb	53
5	Florida Gulf Coast	77
2	Austin Peay	69
10	Stetson	60
3	Queens	71
6	West Georgia	63

Semifinals; Saturday, March 7
1	Central Arkansas	73
5	Florida Gulf Coast	63
2	Austin Peay	83
3	Queens	90

Championship; Sunday, March 8
1	Central Arkansas	93
3	Queens	98*

* denotes overtime period

== Awards and honors ==
Tournament MVP: Nasir Mann, Queens

ASUN All-Tournament Team
- Nasir Mann, Queens
- Chris Ashby, Queens
- Jordan Watford, Queens
- Ty Robinson, Central Arkansas
- Camren Hunter, Central Arkansas
- Rashaud Marshall, Austin Peay
- J.R. Konieczny, FGCU
