= 2025–26 Jacksonville Dolphins men's basketball team =

American college basketball season

2025–26 Jacksonville Dolphins men's basketball
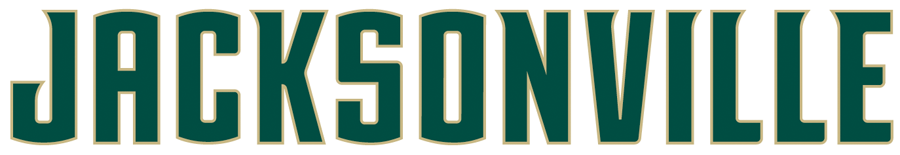
- Conference: Atlantic Sun Conference
- Record: 12–20 (7–11 ASUN)
- Head coach: Jordan Mincy (5th season)
- Associate head coach: Troy Pierce
- Assistant coaches: Mychal Covington; Brett Comer; Timothy Peete; Joshua Washington
- Home arena: Swisher Gymnasium

2025–26 ASUN men's basketball standings
	Conf.				Overall
Team	W		L	PCT	W		L	PCT
Central Arkansas	15	–	3	.833	20	–	11	.645
Austin Peay	15	–	3	.833	21	–	8	.724
Queens	13	–	5	.722	18	–	13	.581
Lipscomb	12	–	6	.667	19	–	12	.613
Florida Gulf Coast	8	–	10	.444	14	–	17	.452
West Georgia*	8	–	10	.444	14	–	16	.467
Eastern Kentucky	7	–	11	.389	11	–	20	.355
Bellarmine	7	–	11	.389	12	–	18	.400
Jacksonville	7	–	11	.389	12	–	19	.387
Stetson	7	–	11	.389	11	–	20	.355
North Florida	5	–	13	.278	7	–	24	.226
North Alabama	4	–	14	.222	9	–	20	.310
† 2026 ASUN tournament winner * ineligible for the 2026 NCAA tournament due to transition from Division II; As of February 28, 2026

The 2025–26 Jacksonville Dolphins men's basketball team represented Jacksonville University during the 2025–26 NCAA Division I men's basketball season. The Dolphins, led by fifth-year head coach Jordan Mincy, played their home games at Swisher Gymnasium in Jacksonville, Florida as members of the Atlantic Sun Conference.

== Previous season ==
The Dolphins finished the 2024–25 season 19–14, 12–6 in ASUN play, to finish in a tie for fourth place. They defeated Eastern Kentucky, before falling to North Alabama in the semifinals of the ASUN tournament. They received an invitation to the CBI, where they would be defeated by Incarnate Word in the quarterfinals.

== Preseason ==
On October 17, 2025, the ASUN released their preseason polls. Jacksonville was picked to finish sixth in both the coaches poll and the media poll.

=== Preseason rankings ===
ASUN Preseason Coaches Poll
Place	Team	Votes
1	Queens	136 (6)
2	North Alabama	117
3	Eastern Kentucky	111 (2)
4	Florida Gulf Coast	98 (2)
5	Austin Peay	94 (1)
6	Jacksonville	88
7	Lipscomb	77
8	Central Arkansas	57
9	Stetson	56
10	Bellarmine	36
11	North Florida	34 (1)
12	West Georgia	32
(#) first-place votes

ASUN Preseason Media Poll
Place	Team	Votes
1	North Alabama	519 (18)
2	Eastern Kentucky	495 (3)
3	Queens	468 (9)
4	Florida Gulf Coast	465 (12)
5	Lipscomb	408 (9)
6	Jacksonville	381
7	Austin Peay	357
8	Stetson	243
9	North Florida	192
10	Bellarmine	189
11	Central Arkansas	174
12	West Georgia	126
(#) first-place votes

=== Preseason All-ASUN Team ===
Preseason All-ASUN Team
Player	Year	Position
Chris Arias	Sophomore	Guard

== Roster ==
2025–26 Jacksonville Dolphins men's basketball team
Players
Coaches

Pos.	#	Name	Height	Weight	Year	Previous school	Hometown
F	0	Jaylen Jordon	6 ft 8 in (2.03 m)	235 lb (107 kg)	Sr	Flagler	Hilliard, Florida
G	1	Chris Arias	6 ft 6 in (1.98 m)	205 lb (93 kg)	So	Providence School	Jacksonville, Florida
G	2	Jaylen Jones	6 ft 0 in (1.83 m)	170 lb (77 kg)	Jr	Oakland	Nashville, Tennessee
G	4	Anakin Brown	6 ft 3 in (1.91 m)	175 lb (79 kg)	RS Fr	Beachside High School	Jacksonville, Florida
F	5	Tito Deng	6 ft 11 in (2.11 m)	210 lb (95 kg)	Jr	CBA Academy	Warrap, South Sudan
G	6	Lamont Jackson	6 ft 0 in (1.83 m)	165 lb (75 kg)	So	C.A. Johnson High School	Columbia, South Carolina
G	8	Hayden Wood	6 ft 6 in (1.98 m)	205 lb (93 kg)	Fr	Har-Ber High School	Springdale, Arkansas
G	9	Michael Harper Jr.	6 ft 3 in (1.91 m)	195 lb (88 kg)	Fr	Hamilton County High School	Jasper, Florida
G	10	Simon Wheeler	5 ft 10 in (1.78 m)	165 lb (75 kg)	Sr	Ashland	Detroit, Michigan
G	11	Chris Lockett Jr.	6 ft 4 in (1.93 m)	190 lb (86 kg)	So	Boise State	New Orleans, Louisiana
G	12	Roman Loux	6 ft 0 in (1.83 m)	165 lb (75 kg)	Fr	Tocoi Creek High School	St. Augustine, Florida
F	14	Allen Udemadu	6 ft 10 in (2.08 m)	240 lb (109 kg)	Sr	Missouri State	Lagos, Nigeria
C	22	Charles Caporaso	7 ft 0 in (2.13 m)	235 lb (107 kg)	So	Coffeyville Community College	Lake Mary, Florida
F	23	Enrico Borio	6 ft 8 in (2.03 m)	220 lb (100 kg)	So	North Broward Prep	Curitiba, Brazil
F	31	Jason Thirdkill Jr.	6 ft 7 in (2.01 m)	215 lb (98 kg)	Sr	William Jewell	Detroit, Michigan
F	33	Donovan Rivers	6 ft 9 in (2.06 m)	230 lb (104 kg)	Jr	TSF Academy	Columbia, South Carolina
G	34	Evan Sterck	6 ft 1 in (1.85 m)	180 lb (82 kg)	Fr	The Rock School	St. Louis, Missouri

Head coach

- Jordan Mincy (Kent State)

Assistant coach(es)

- Troy Pierce (Emporia State)
- Mychal Covington (Oakland)
- Brett Comer (Florida Gulf Coast)
- Timothy Peete (Tulsa)
- Joshua Washington (Marian)

Legend

- (C) Team captain
- (S) Suspended
- (I) Ineligible
- (W) Walk-on
- Injured
- Current redshirt

Roster
Last update: December 2, 2025

== Schedule and results ==
Date time, TV	Rank^{#}	Opponent^{#}	Result	Record	Site (attendance) city, state
Non-conference regular season
November 3, 2025*; 8:00 pm, ACCNX		at Miami (FL)	L 69–86	0–1	Watsco Center (5,633); Coral Gables, FL
November 6, 2025*; 8:00 pm, ESPN+		Trinity (Florida)	W 132–45	1–1	Swisher Gymnasium (350); Jacksonville, FL
November 11, 2025*; 7:00 pm, ESPN+		at High Point	L 64–85	1–2	Qubein Center (2,786); High Point, NC
November 15, 2025*; 1:00 pm, ESPN+		at VMI; ASUN/SoCon Challenge	W 69–67	2–2	Cameron Hall (2,256); Lexington, VA
November 18, 2025*; 7:00 pm, ESPN+		at George Mason; Sunshine Slam campus game	L 57–79	2–3	EagleBank Arena (2,578); Fairfax, VA
November 24, 2025*; 2:00 pm, BallerTV		vs. Bethune–Cookman; Sunshine Slam Ocean Bracket semifinals	W 69–64	3–3	Ocean Center; Daytona Beach, FL
November 25, 2025*; 1:00 pm, BallerTV		vs. Pacific; Sunshine Slam Ocean Bracket championship	L 53–68	3–4	Ocean Center; Daytona Beach, FL
December 2, 2025*; 7:00 pm, ESPN+		Florida A&M	W 85–82 ^{OT}	4–4	Swisher Gymnasium (862); Jacksonville, FL
December 6, 2025*; 2:00 pm, ESPN+		at FIU	L 65–88	4–5	Ocean Bank Convocation Center (338); Miami, FL
December 11, 2025*; 7:00 pm, ESPN+		Trinity (Jacksonville)	W 122−49	5−5	Swisher Gymnasium (652); Jacksonville, FL
December 14, 2025*; 7:00 pm, SECN		at Texas A&M	L 75–112	5–6	Reed Arena (6,250); College Station, TX
December 17, 2025*; 7:00 pm		at Florida A&M	L 65–72	5–7	Al Lawson Center (791); Tallahassee, FL
December 22, 2025*; 7:00 pm, ESPN+		at Florida State	L 63–87	5–8	Donald L. Tucker Center (4,077); Tallahassee, FL
ASUN regular season
January 1, 2026; 1:00 pm, ESPN+		at Lipscomb	L 57–76	5–9 (0–1)	Allen Arena (804); Nashville, TN
January 3, 2026; 5:00 pm, ESPN+		at Austin Peay	L 68–71	5–10 (0–2)	F&M Bank Arena (1,821); Clarksville, TN
January 8, 2026; 7:00 pm, ESPN+		Queens	L 51–77	5–11 (0–3)	Swisher Gymnasium (549); Jacksonville, FL
January 10, 2026; 3:00 pm, ESPN+		West Georgia	W 75–43	6–11 (1–3)	Swisher Gymnasium (677); Jacksonville, FL
January 15, 2026; 7:30 pm, ESPN+		at Central Arkansas	L 60–62	6–12 (1–4)	Farris Center (922); Conway, AR
January 17, 2026; 3:00 pm, ESPN+		at North Alabama	W 90–68	7–12 (2–4)	CB&S Bank Arena (2,389); Florence, AL
January 22, 2026; 7:00 pm, ESPN+		Bellarmine	L 70–77	7–13 (2–5)	Swisher Gymnasium (762); Jacksonville, FL
January 24, 2026; 3:00 pm, ESPN+		Eastern Kentucky	W 81–76 ^{OT}	8–13 (3–5)	Swisher Gymnasium (652); Jacksonville, FL
January 29, 2026; 7:00 pm, ESPN+		Lipscomb	W 70–65	9–13 (4–5)	Swisher Gymnasium (883); Jacksonville, FL
January 31, 2026; 3:00 pm, ESPN+		Florida Gulf Coast	L 49-68	9-14 (4-6)	Swisher Gymnasium (612); Jacksonville, FL
February 5, 2026; 7:00 pm, ESPN+		at Queens	L 84-93	9-15 (4-7)	Curry Arena (572); Charlotte, NC
February 7, 2026; 2:00 pm, ESPN+		at West Georgia	L 73-87	9-16 (4-8)	The Coliseum (572); Carrollton, GA
February 11, 2026; 7:00 pm, ESPN+		at Stetson	L 62-67	9-17 (4-9)	Insight Credit Union Arena (917); DeLand, FL
February 14, 2026; 4:00 pm, ESPN+		North Florida	W 63–56	10–17 (5–9)	Swisher Gymnasium (908); Jacksonville, FL
February 18, 2026; 7:00 pm, ESPN+		at Florida Gulf Coast	L 84–86	10–18 (5–10)	Alico Arena (1,861); Fort Myers, FL
February 21, 2026; 7:00 pm, ESPN+		Austin Peay	L 61–65	10–19 (5–11)	Swisher Gymnasium (872); Jacksonville, FL
February 26, 2026; 7:00 pm, ESPN+		Stetson	W 89–85	11–19 (6–11)	Swisher Gymnasium (732); Jacksonville, FL
February 28, 2026; 6:00 pm, ESPN+		at North Florida	W 85–61	12–19 (7–11)	UNF Arena (2,539); Jacksonville, FL
ASUN tournament
March 4, 2026; 12:00 p.m., ESPN+	(9)	vs. (8) Bellarmine; First round	L 79–82	12–20	UNF Arena; Jacksonville, FL
*Non-conference game. ^{#}Rankings from AP Poll. (#) Tournament seedings in parentheses. All times are in Eastern.
