= 2025–26 North Florida Ospreys men's basketball team =

American college basketball season

2025–26 North Florida Ospreys men's basketball
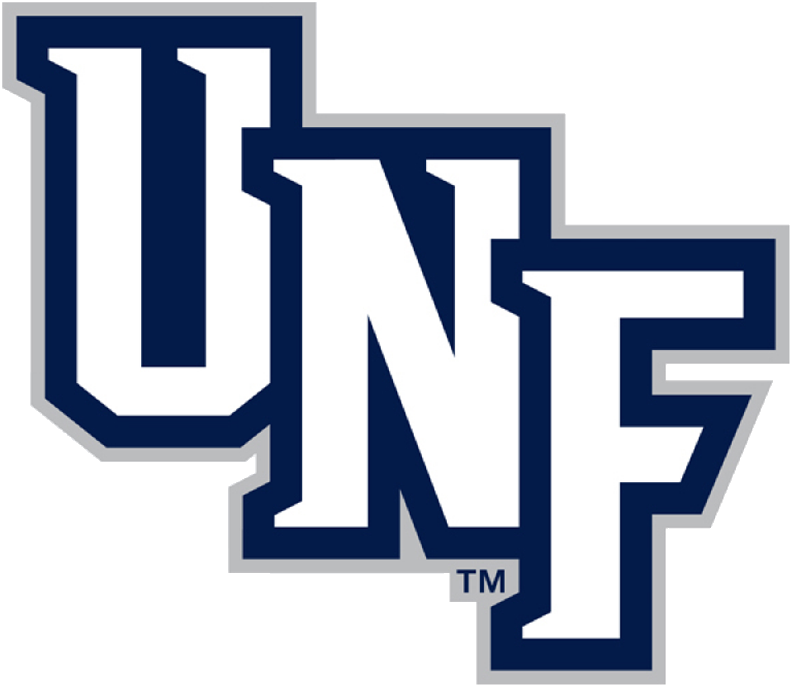
- Conference: Atlantic Sun Conference
- Record: 7–25 (5–13 ASUN)
- Head coach: Bobby Kennen (interim)
- Associate head coach: Bruce Evans
- Assistant coaches: Stephen Perkins; Bob Marlin (1st season); Carter Hendricksen; David Aucremann
- Home arena: UNF Arena

2025–26 ASUN men's basketball standings
	Conf.				Overall
Team	W		L	PCT	W		L	PCT
Central Arkansas	15	–	3	.833	22	–	12	.647
Austin Peay	15	–	3	.833	22	–	9	.710
Queens †	13	–	5	.722	21	–	14	.600
Lipscomb	12	–	6	.667	19	–	13	.594
Florida Gulf Coast	8	–	10	.444	16	–	18	.471
West Georgia*	8	–	10	.444	15	–	17	.469
Eastern Kentucky	7	–	11	.389	11	–	21	.344
Bellarmine	7	–	11	.389	13	–	19	.406
Jacksonville	7	–	11	.389	12	–	20	.375
Stetson	7	–	11	.389	12	–	21	.364
North Florida	5	–	13	.278	7	–	25	.219
North Alabama	4	–	14	.222	9	–	21	.300
† 2026 ASUN tournament winner * ineligible for the 2026 NCAA tournament due to transition from Division II

The 2025–26 North Florida Ospreys men's basketball team represented University of North Florida during the 2025-26 NCAA Division I men's basketball season. The Ospreys, led by first-year head coach Bobby Kennen, played their home games at the UNF Arena in Jacksonville, Florida as members of the Atlantic Sun Conference (ASUN).

They finished the season 7–25, 5–13 in ASUN play, to finish in eleventh place. In the Atlantic Sun tournament, they lost to sixth seed West Georgia in the first round.

== Previous season ==
The Ospreys finished the 2024–25 season 15–17, 8–10 in ASUN play, to finish in eighth place. As the eighth seed in the Atlantic Sun tournament, they lost to seventh seed Austin Peay in the first round.

== Preseason ==
On October 17, 2025, the ASUN released their preseason polls. North Florida was picked to finish eleventh in the coaches poll, with one first-place vote and ninth in the media poll.

=== Preseason rankings ===
ASUN Preseason Coaches Poll
Place	Team	Votes
1	Queens	136 (6)
2	North Alabama	117
3	Eastern Kentucky	111 (2)
4	Florida Gulf Coast	98 (2)
5	Austin Peay	94 (1)
6	Jacksonville	88
7	Lipscomb	77
8	Central Arkansas	57
9	Stetson	56
10	Bellarmine	36
11	North Florida	34 (1)
12	West Georgia	32
(#) first-place votes

ASUN Preseason Media Poll
Place	Team	Votes
1	North Alabama	519 (18)
2	Eastern Kentucky	495 (3)
3	Queens	468 (9)
4	Florida Gulf Coast	465 (12)
5	Lipscomb	408 (9)
6	Jacksonville	381
7	Austin Peay	357
8	Stetson	243
9	North Florida	192
10	Bellarmine	189
11	Central Arkansas	174
12	West Georgia	126
(#) first-place votes

=== Preseason All-ASUN Team ===
No players were named to the All-ASUN team.

== Roster ==
2025–26 North Florida Ospreys men's basketball team
Players
Coaches

Pos.	#	Name	Height	Weight	Year	Previous school	Hometown
G	0	Mason Watkins	6 ft 3 in (1.91 m)	165 lb (75 kg)	Fr	West Burlington HS	West Burlington, IA
G/F	1	BJ Plummer	6 ft 6 in (1.98 m)	189 lb (86 kg)	Fr	James S. Rickards HS	Tallahassee, FL
G/F	2	Mason Lee	6 ft 7 in (2.01 m)	200 lb (91 kg)	RS So	Providence School	Jacksonville Beach, FL
G	3	Taylor Thompson	5 ft 11 in (1.8 m)	172 lb (78 kg)	RS Fr	Impact Christian Academy	Jacksonville, FL
G	4	Devin Hines	6 ft 4 in (1.93 m)	188 lb (85 kg)	GS	Saint Andrew's School	West Palm Beach, FL
G	5	Dante Oliver	6 ft 5 in (1.96 m)	190 lb (86 kg)	So	IMG Academy	Knoxville, TN
G	10	Kent Jackson	6 ft 2 in (1.88 m)	169 lb (77 kg)	So	Episcopal School of Jacksonville	Jacksonville, FL
G	11	Kamrin Oriol	6 ft 3 in (1.91 m)	187 lb (85 kg)	Sr	The Master's	St. Petersburg, FL
F	12	Arden Begaj	7 ft 0 in (2.13 m)	215 lb (98 kg)	RS Fr	Bill Crothers Secondary School	Toronto, ON
G	13	Alex Vargo	6 ft 5 in (1.96 m)	190 lb (86 kg)	RS Sr	Garrett College	Wheeling, WV
G/F	21	Dalton Gayman	6 ft 7 in (2.01 m)	223 lb (101 kg)	GS	Purdue Northwest	Nevada, MO
G/F	22	Trey Cady	6 ft 8 in (2.03 m)	205 lb (93 kg)	Fr	Marion Harding HS	Marion, OH
F	24	Nestor Dyachok	6 ft 9 in (2.06 m)	218 lb (99 kg)	GS	Southern Utah	Moscow, Russia
G	25	Gabe Jacobs	6 ft 1 in (1.85 m)	170 lb (77 kg)	Fr	Warner Robins HS	Warner Robins, GA

Head coach

- Bobby Kennen (Palm Beach Atlantic)

Assistant coach(es)

- Bruce Evans (Furman)
- Stephen Perkins (Baylor)
- Bob Marlin (Mississippi State)
- Carter Hendricksen (North Florida)

Legend

- (C) Team captain
- (S) Suspended
- (I) Ineligible
- (W) Walk-on
- Injured
- Current redshirt

Roster
Last update: November 6, 2025

== Schedule and results ==
Date time, TV	Rank^{#}	Opponent^{#}	Result	Record	Site (attendance) city, state
Exhibition
October 29, 2025*; 7:00 p.m.		Warner	W 84–60		UNF Arena; Jacksonville, FL
Non-conference regular season
November 6, 2025*; 8:00 p.m., SECN+/ESPN+		at No. 3 Florida	L 64–104	0–1	O'Connell Center (10,065); Gainesville, FL
November 12, 2025*; 7:00 p.m., SECN+/ESPN+		at No. 20 Tennessee	L 66−99	0−2	Thompson-Boling Arena (17,614); Knoxville, TN
November 15, 2025*; 2:00 p.m., ESPN+		New College of Florida	W 122–67	1–2	UNF Arena (2,601); Jacksonville, FL
November 19, 2025*; 7:00 p.m., ESPN+		at Wofford	L 78–86	1–3	Jerry Richardson Indoor Stadium (1,738); Spartanburg, SC
November 22, 2025*; 8:00 p.m., YouTube		vs. Southern Miss; Pensacola Invitational Semifinal	L 83–92	1–4	Pensacola Bay Center (874); Pensacola, FL
November 23, 2025*; 2:30 p.m., YouTube		vs. Prairie View A&M; Pensacola Invitational consolation game	L 82–85	1–5	Pensacola Bay Center; Pensacola, FL
November 29, 2025*; 5:00 p.m., ESPN+		Trinity College of Jacksonville	W 111–67	2–5	UNF Arena (923); Jacksonville, FL
December 2, 2025*; 7:00 p.m., ESPN+		SIU Edwardsville	L 63–72	2–6	UNF Arena (1,166); Jacksonville, FL
December 7, 2025*; 9:00 p.m., ESPN+		at No. 11 Gonzaga	L 58–109	2–7	McCarthey Athletic Center (6,000); Spokane, WA
December 13, 2025*; 7:00 p.m., ESPN+		at Dayton	L 61–84	2–8	UD Arena (13,407); Dayton, OH
December 18, 2025*; 11:00 a.m., ESPN+		at Charleston Southern	L 90–113	2–9	Buccaneer Field House (903); North Charleston, SC
December 21, 2025*; 4:00 p.m., ACCNX		at Miami (FL)	L 67–105	2–10	Watsco Center (3,862); Coral Gables, FL
December 28, 2025*; 2:00 p.m., ESPN+		Columbia	L 82–90	2–11	UNF Arena (1,169); Jacksonville, FL
ASUN regular season
January 1, 2026; 8:00 p.m., ESPN+		at Austin Peay	L 83–102	2–12 (0–1)	F&M Bank Arena (1,091); Clarksville, TN
January 3, 2026; 5:00 p.m., ESPN+		at Lipscomb	L 74–82	2–13 (0–2)	Allen Arena (924); Nashville, TN
January 8, 2026; 7:00 p.m., ESPN+		West Georgia	L 73–85	2–14 (0–3)	UNF Arena (1,264); Jacksonville, FL
January 10, 2026; 2:00 p.m., ESPN+		Queens	L 82–89	2–15 (0–4)	UNF Arena (1,280); Jacksonville, FL
January 15, 2026; 7:00 p.m., ESPN+		at North Alabama	W 105–91	3–15 (1–4)	CB&S Bank Arena (2,252); Florence, AL
January 17, 2026; 2:00 p.m., ESPN+		at Central Arkansas	L 69–98	3–16 (1–5)	Farris Center (802); Conway, AR
January 22, 2026; 7:00 p.m., ESPN+		Eastern Kentucky	W 87–85	4–16 (2–5)	UNF Arena (1,317); Jacksonville, FL
January 24, 2026; 2:00 p.m., ESPN+		Bellarmine	W 117–114 ^{OT}	5–16 (3–5)	UNF Arena (1,155); Jacksonville, FL
January 29, 2026; 7:00 p.m., ESPN+		Stetson	L 77–84	5–17 (3–6)	UNF Arena (1,476); Jacksonville, FL
January 31, 2026; 2:00 p.m., ESPN+		Lipscomb	L 94–100	5–18 (3–7)	UNF Arena (1,421); Jacksonville, FL
February 5, 2026; 7:00 p.m., ESPN+		at West Georgia	W 81–73	6–18 (4–7)	The Coliseum (592); Carrollton, GA
February 7, 2026; 3:00 p.m., ESPN+		at Queens	L 72–91	6–19 (4–8)	Curry Arena (1,026); Charlotte, NC
February 11, 2026; 7:00 p.m., ESPN+		at Florida Gulf Coast	L 81–90	6–20 (4–9)	Alico Arena (1,650); Fort Myers, FL
February 14, 2026; 4:00 p.m., ESPN+		at Jacksonville; River City Rumble	L 56–63	6–21 (4–10)	Swisher Gymnasium (908); Jacksonville, FL
February 19, 2026; 7:00 p.m., ESPN+		Austin Peay	L 76–77	6–22 (4–11)	UNF Arena (1,297); Jacksonville, FL
February 21, 2026; 3:30 p.m., ESPN+		at Stetson	L 71–76	6–23 (4–12)	Insight Credit Union Arena (780); DeLand, FL
February 26, 2026; 7:00 p.m., ESPN+		Florida Gulf Coast	W 76–70	7–23 (5–12)	UNF Arena (2,156); Jacksonville, FL
February 28, 2026; 6:00 p.m., ESPN+		Jacksonville; River City Rumble/Senior Night	L 61–85	7–24 (5–13)	UNF Arena (2,539); Jacksonville, FL
ASUN tournament
March 4, 2026; 7:30 p.m., ESPN+	(11)	vs. (6) West Georgia; First round	L 85–93	7–25	Swisher Gymnasium (690); Jacksonville, FL
*Non-conference game. ^{#}Rankings from AP poll. (#) Tournament seedings in parentheses. All times are in Eastern.
