= 2025–26 North Alabama Lions men's basketball team =

American college basketball season

2025–26 North Alabama Lions men's basketball
- Conference: ASUN Conference
- Record: 9–21 (4–14 ASUN)
- Head coach: Tony Pujol (8th season)
- Associate head coach: Ahmad Smith
- Assistant coaches: Andrew Steele; Eric Wagenlander; Sean Foley
- Home arena: CB&S Bank Arena

2025–26 ASUN men's basketball standings
	Conf.				Overall
Team	W		L	PCT	W		L	PCT
Central Arkansas	15	–	3	.833	22	–	12	.647
Austin Peay	15	–	3	.833	22	–	9	.710
Queens †	13	–	5	.722	21	–	14	.600
Lipscomb	12	–	6	.667	19	–	13	.594
Florida Gulf Coast	8	–	10	.444	16	–	18	.471
West Georgia*	8	–	10	.444	15	–	17	.469
Eastern Kentucky	7	–	11	.389	11	–	21	.344
Bellarmine	7	–	11	.389	13	–	19	.406
Jacksonville	7	–	11	.389	12	–	20	.375
Stetson	7	–	11	.389	12	–	21	.364
North Florida	5	–	13	.278	7	–	25	.219
North Alabama	4	–	14	.222	9	–	21	.300
† 2026 ASUN tournament winner * ineligible for the 2026 NCAA tournament due to transition from Division II

The 2025–26 North Alabama Lions men's basketball team represented the University of North Alabama during the 2025–26 NCAA Division I men's basketball season. The Lions, led by eighth-year head coach Tony Pujol, played their home games at the CB&S Bank Arena located in Florence, Alabama as members the ASUN Conference.

== Previous Season ==
The Lions finished the 2024–25 season 24–11, 14–4 in ASUN play to tie for the ASUN regular season championship. This marked the school's first ASUN regular season championship.

In the ASUN tournament, the Lions advanced to the championship before losing to the Lipscomb Bisons 65–76.

After the conference postseason, the Lions were awarded their first-ever berth into the NIT, where they lost to Bradley in the first round. The season ended as their winningest since 2008.

Following the season, First-Team All-Conference point guard Jacari Lane entered the transfer portal. On April 14, Lane announced he would be transferring to Texas A&M, becoming the first transfer for new Aggies head coach Bucky McMillan.

== Preseason ==
On October 17, 2025, the ASUN released their preseason polls. North Alabama was picked to finish second in the coaches poll and first in the media poll, while receiving 18 first-place votes in the latter poll.

=== Preseason rankings ===
ASUN Preseason Coaches Poll
Place	Team	Votes
1	Queens	136 (6)
2	North Alabama	117
3	Eastern Kentucky	111 (2)
4	Florida Gulf Coast	98 (2)
5	Austin Peay	94 (1)
6	Jacksonville	88
7	Lipscomb	77
8	Central Arkansas	57
9	Stetson	56
10	Bellarmine	36
11	North Florida	34 (1)
12	West Georgia	32
(#) first-place votes

ASUN Preseason Media Poll
Place	Team	Votes
1	North Alabama	519 (18)
2	Eastern Kentucky	495 (3)
3	Queens	468 (9)
4	Florida Gulf Coast	465 (12)
5	Lipscomb	408 (9)
6	Jacksonville	381
7	Austin Peay	357
8	Stetson	243
9	North Florida	192
10	Bellarmine	189
11	Central Arkansas	174
12	West Georgia	126
(#) first-place votes

=== Preseason All-ASUN Team ===
Preseason All-ASUN Team
Player	Year	Position
Corneilous Williams^	Redshirt Junior	Forward
Donte Bacchus	Senior	Forward
(^) unanimous selection

== Roster ==
2025–26 North Alabama Lions men's basketball team
Players
Coaches

Pos.	#	Name	Height	Weight	Year	Previous school	Hometown
F	0	Tank Washington	6 ft 7 in (2.01 m)	210 lb (95 kg)	Jr	Coastal Alabama-North CC	Panama City, Florida
F	1	Donte Bacchus	6 ft 7 in (2.01 m)	220 lb (100 kg)	Sr	Snead State CC	Homewood, Alabama
F	2	Corneilous Williams	6 ft 9 in (2.06 m)	216 lb (98 kg)	RS Jr	Western Carolina	Beaumont, Mississippi
G	3	Braylon Patton	6 ft 0 in (1.83 m)	180 lb (82 kg)	Fr	Hueytown High School	Birmingham, Alabama
G	4	Canin Jefferson	6 ft 2 in (1.88 m)	185 lb (84 kg)	Jr	Isidore Newman School	New Orleans, Louisiana
G	5	Kedar Bodie	6 ft 3 in (1.91 m)	205 lb (93 kg)	Jr	Bishop State CC	Augusta, Georgia
G	8	Kevin de Kovachich	6 ft 4 in (1.93 m)	185 lb (84 kg)	So	Hamilton Heights Academy	Montréal, Québec
G	12	Cortez Graham-Howard	6 ft 5 in (1.96 m)	210 lb (95 kg)	Fr	Hillsboro High School	Nashville, Tennessee
C	21	Israel Jenrette	7 ft 2 in (2.18 m)	262 lb (119 kg)	So	Valdosta High School	Valdosta, Georgia
C	24	Mitchell Chaffee	6 ft 10 in (2.08 m)	210 lb (95 kg)	Sr	Calhoun CC	Muscle Shoals, Alabama
F	25	DarKaun King	6 ft 7 in (2.01 m)	215 lb (98 kg)	So	TACA Academy	Dallas, Texas
F	34	Dallas Howell	6 ft 7 in (2.01 m)	220 lb (100 kg)	RS Sr	Enterprise High School	Coffee Springs, Alabama
C	35	Jamal Albritton	6 ft 9 in (2.06 m)	250 lb (113 kg)	RS Sr	Wallace-Selma CC	Montgomery, Alabama
G	55	King Walker	6 ft 6 in (1.98 m)	185 lb (84 kg)	RS Fr	Loomis Chaffee School	Detroit, Michigan

Head coach

- Tony Pujol (Sterling)

Assistant coach(es)

- Ahmad Smith (Appalachian State)
- Andrew Steele (Alabama)
- Eric Wagenlander (Wofford)
- Sean Foley (McDaniel)

Legend

- (C) Team captain
- (S) Suspended
- (I) Ineligible
- (W) Walk-on
- Injured
- Current redshirt

Roster
Last update: November 4, 2025

== Schedule and results ==
Date time, TV	Rank^{#}	Opponent^{#}	Result	Record	High points	High rebounds	High assists	Site (attendance) city, state
Non-conference regular season
November 5, 2025*; 8:00 pm, SEC Network		at Mississippi State	L 62–86	0–1	16 – Jefferson	13 – Williams	2 – Tied	Humphrey Coliseum (9,060); Starkville, MS
November 7, 2025*; 6:00 pm, ESPN+		Lane College	W 90–84	1–1	22 – Williams	12 – Williams	5 – de Kovachich	CB&S Bank Arena (2,423); Florence, AL
November 11, 2025*; 6:00 pm, ESPN+		Northwestern State	W 87–83 ^{OT}	2–1	28 – Williams	16 – Williams	4 – Tied	CB&S Bank Arena (2,378); Florence, AL
November 15, 2025*; 2:00 pm, ESPN+		East Tennessee State	L 74–78	2–2	19 – Tied	12 – Williams	4 – Howell	CB&S Bank Arena (2,256); Florence, AL
November 17, 2025*; 8:00 pm, ACC Network		at Clemson	L 61–81	2–3	12 – de Kovachich	5 – Howell	2 – Tied	Littlejohn Coliseum (6,356); Clemson, SC
November 22, 2025*; 3:30 p.m., ESPN+		at Chattanooga; ASUN/SoCon Challenge	L 57–71	2–4	18 – de Kovachich	6 – Williams	3 – Jefferson	McKenzie Arena (3,455); Chattanooga, TN
November 25, 2025*; 12:00 pm, ESPN+		UT Southern	W 92–60	3–4	16 – Williams	10 – Williams	5 – de Kovachich	CB&S Bank Arena (2,112); Florence, AL
December 1, 2025*; 6:00 pm, ESPN+		at Jacksonville State	W 73–66	4–4	19 – Bacchus	13 – Williams	4 – Jefferson	Pete Mathews Coliseum (1,634); Jacksonville, AL
December 3, 2025*; 9:00 pm, ESPN+		at San Francisco	W 65–63	5–4	20 – Bacchus	8 – Williams	3 – Jefferson	Sobrato Center (1,864); San Francisco, CA
December 15, 2025*; 7:00 pm, SWAC TV		at Alabama A&M	L 60–68	5–5	20 – Jefferson	8 – Williams	3 – de Kovachich	Alabama A&M Events Center (1,209); Huntsville, AL
December 19, 2025*; 9:00 pm		at Loyola Marymount	L 57–91	5–6	14 – Williams	11 – Williams	3 – Jefferson	Gersten Pavilion; Los Angeles, CA
ASUN regular season
January 1, 2026; 2:00 pm, ESPN+		Stetson	L 67–70	5–7 (0–1)	22 – Bacchus	11 – King	3 – de Kovachich	CB&S Bank Arena (2,056); Florence, AL
January 3, 2026; 2:00 pm, ESPN+		Florida Gulf Coast	L 55–72	5–8 (0–2)	14 – Jefferson	9 – Bacchus	1 – Tied	CB&S Bank Arena (2,534); Florence, AL
January 8, 2026; 6:00 pm, ESPN+		at Eastern Kentucky	L 80–88	5–9 (0–3)	24 – Jefferson	5 – Bacchus	5 – Jefferson	Alumni Coliseum (791); Richmond, KY
January 10, 2026; 6:00 pm, ESPN+		at Bellarmine	W 82–73	6–9 (1–3)	24 – Howell	15 – Williams	7 – Graham-Howard	Knights Hall (1,373); Louisville, KY
January 15, 2026; 6:00 pm, ESPN+		North Florida	L 91–105	6–10 (1–4)	28 – Williams	14 – Williams	4 – Tied	CB&S Bank Arena (2,252); Florence, AL
January 17, 2026; 2:00 pm, ESPN+		Jacksonville	L 68–90	6–11 (1–5)	17 – Tied	6 – Williams	3 – de Kovachich	CB&S Bank Arena (2,389); Florence, AL
January 21, 2026; 6:00 pm, ESPN+		at Queens	L 62–87	6–12 (1–6)	15 – de Kovachich	5 – Williams	3 – Patton	Curry Arena (473); Charlotte, NC
January 29, 2026; 6:00 pm, ESPN+		at Florida Gulf Coast	L 64–72	6–13 (1–7)	21 – Bacchus	10 – Williams	2 – Tied	Alico Arena (1,649); Fort Myers, FL
January 31, 2026; 1:00 pm, ESPN+		at Stetson	W 68–66	7–13 (2–7)	23 – Bacchus	10 – Williams	10 – Jefferson	Edmunds Center (777); DeLand, FL
February 4, 2026; 6:30 pm, ESPN+		at Central Arkansas	L 60-81	7–14 (2–8)	21 – Bacchus	13 – Williams	6 – Patton	Farris Center (984); Conway, AR
February 7, 2026; 4:00 pm, ESPN+		at Austin Peay	L 62–91	7–15 (2–9)	19 – Bacchus	7 – Bacchus	3 – Patton	F&M Bank Arena (4,136); Clarksville, TN
February 9, 2026 (Note: This game was rescheduled from January 24th to February 9th due to Winter Storm Fern); 6:00 pm, ESPN+		Central Arkansas	L 65–72	7–16 (2–10)	17 – Bacchus	5 – Howell	3 – Williams	CB&S Bank Arena (2,202); Florence, AL
February 11, 2026; 6:00 pm, ESPN+		West Georgia	L 73–82	7–17 (2–11)	26 – Bacchus	9 – Tied	3 – de Kovachich	CB&S Bank Arena (2,365); Florence, AL
February 15, 2026; 3:00 pm, ESPNU		Eastern Kentucky	W 84–78 ^{OT}	8–17 (3–11)	21 – Bacchus	15 – Williams	5 – de Kovachich	CB&S Bank Arena (2,815); Florence, AL
February 18, 2026; 6:00 pm, ESPN+		Queens	L 78–85	8–18 (3–12)	23 – de Kovachich	11 – Williams	3 – Tied	CB&S Bank Arena (2,461); Florence, AL
February 21, 2026; 4:30 pm, ESPN+		at Lipscomb	L 51–73	8–19 (3–13)	15 – de Kovachich	10 – Williams	1 – Tied	Allen Arena (1,305); Nashville, TN
February 25, 2026; 8:15 pm, ESPN+		Bellarmine	W 73–68	9–19 (4–13)	20 – Bacchus	13 – Bacchus	4 – de Kovachich	CB&S Bank Arena (2,251); Florence, AL
February 28, 2026; 1:00 pm, ESPN+		at West Georgia	L 63–75	9–20 (4–14)	16 – de Kovachich	5 – Tied	2 – Tied	The Coliseum (1,046); Carrollton, GA
ASUN tournament
March 4, 2026; 1:30 pm, ESPN+	(12)	vs. (5) Florida Gulf Coast; First round	L 58–69	9–21	11 – Tied	6 – Howell	3 – de Kovachich	UNF Arena; Jacksonville, FL
*Non-conference game. ^{#}Rankings from AP Poll. (#) Tournament seedings in parentheses. All times are in Central.
