= Grant Leonard =

American basketball coach

Current position
- Title: Head coach
- Team: Queens Royals
- Conference: ASUN
- Record: 74–63 (.540)

Biographical details
- Born: August 20, 1980 (age 46)

Playing career
- c. 2003: William Penn
- Position: Point guard / shooting guard

Coaching career (HC unless noted)
- 2004–2005: Shorewood HS (WI) (assistant)
- 2005–2006: Washington College (assistant)
- 2009–2010: Flagler (assistant)
- 2011–2013: Paine (assistant)
- 2013–2016: Queens (assistant)
- 2016–2022: Queens (AHC)
- 2022–present: Queens

Administrative career (AD unless noted)
- 2006–2009: Texas–Pan American (DBO)

Head coaching record
- Overall: 74–63 (.540)
- Tournaments: 0–1 (NCAA Division I)

Accomplishments and honors

Championships
- ASUN tournament (2026)

Grant Leonard (born August 20, 1980) is an American basketball coach and former player. He is the current head coach of the Queens Royals men's basketball team.

== Early life ==
Leonard was born on August 20, 1980. He grew up in Milwaukee, Wisconsin. He attended Martin Luther High School and later played basketball in college for the William Penn Statesmen in Iowa. A point guard and shooting guard, he made over 40% of his three-point shots in his collegiate career. He was selected academic all-conference twice and was a two-time academic all-region player, graduating in 2004 cum laude with a bachelor's degree in psychology. He directed the North Shore Basketball Camp in Chicago while in high school and college and later received a master's degree from Washington College.

== Coaching career ==
Leonard began his coaching career as an assistant at Shorewood High School, serving as an assistant coach from 2004–05. He assisted in coaching the Washington College Shoremen in 2005–06. The following three seasons, Leonard was the director of basketball operations for the Texas–Pan American Broncs. He then served as an assistant coach for the Flagler Saints in 2009–10. From 2011 until 2013, Leonard worked for the Paine Lions, where he was an assistant coach, recruiting coordinator, director of skill development and defensive specialist. He helped the NCAA Division II school have their first winning season in seven years in 2011–12.

Leonard was hired by the Division II Queens Royals in 2013 and received a promotion to associate head coach in 2016. In his last seven years as an assistant coach for the team, they had a winning percentage of .837 with a 189–37 overall record, being a top-25 ranked team near-consistently going back to November 2015, including a best ranking of No. 1. Queens won the South Atlantic Conference (SAC) regular season championship three times with Leonard on the staff while also having two SAC tournament titles and two Elite Eight appearances. He was promoted to head coach for the 2022–23 season, the first in which Queens competed in the NCAA Division I. In Leonard's first season as head coach, Queens went 18–15 and had a 7–11 record in the Atlantic Sun Conference (ASUN). He signed a four-year contract extension after the season.

== Personal life ==
Leonard married in 2021. In November 2022, Leonard was arrested for driving while impaired, for which he was suspended by Queens for five games.

== Head coaching record ==
Record table
Season	Team	Overall	Conference	Standing	Postseason
Queens Royals (ASUN Conference) (2022–present)
2022–23	Queens	18–15	7–11	T–9th	
2023–24	Queens	14–19	7–9	8th	
2024–25	Queens	20–15	11–7	6th	CBI Quarterfinals
2025–26	Queens	21–14	13–5	3rd	NCAA Division I Round of 64
2026–27	Queens	1–0	0–0		
Queens:		74–63 (.540)	38–32 (.543)		
Total:		74–63 (.540)			
National champion Postseason invitational champion Conference regular season champion Conference regular season and conference tournament champion Division regular season champion Division regular season and conference tournament champion Conference tournament champion
