= Queens Royals men's basketball =

2026–27 Queens Royals men's basketball team
- University: Queens University of Charlotte
- Head coach: Grant Leonard (5th season)
- Location: Charlotte, North Carolina
- Arena: Curry Arena (capacity: 2,569)
- Conference: Atlantic Sun Conference
- Nickname: Royals
- Colors: Navy blue and vegas gold

NCAA Division I tournament appearances
- 2026

NCAA Division II tournament Final Four
- 2003, 2018
Other NCAA Division II tournament results
Elite Eight	2001, 2003, 2018, 2019
Appearances	1996, 1998, 1999, 2001, 2003, 2007, 2008, 2011, 2016, 2017, 2018, 2019, 2020, 2021, 2022

Conference tournament champions
- Conference Carolinas: 1996, 1998, 1999 SAC: 2017, 2022 ASUN: 2026

Conference regular-season champions
- Conference Carolinas: 1998, 1999, 2001, 2003, 2011

The Queens Royals men's basketball team represents the Queens University of Charlotte in Charlotte, North Carolina, United States. The Royals joined the NCAA Division I ASUN Conference on July 1, 2022, after nine seasons in the Division II South Atlantic Conference. They made their first ever appearance in the NCAA Division I men's basketball tournament in 2026.

The team, currently led by fourth-year head coach Grant Leonard, plays its home games at Curry Arena.

== History ==
Queens fielded its first men's basketball team in the 1989-90 season; Dale Layer was the team's first head coach. Queens first competed in Conference Carolinas from 1995 to 2013 before playing in the South Atlantic Conference, which they played in until 2022.

== Postseason results ==
=== NCAA Division I results ===
The Royals have appeared in one NCAA Division I men's basketball tournament. Their combined record is 0–1.

Year	Round	Opponent	Result
2026	First round	Purdue	L 71–104

=== CBI results ===
The Royals have participated in one College Basketball Invitational (CBI) tournament. Their record is 1–1.

Year	Round	Opponent	Result
2025	First Round; Quarterfinals	Northern Arizona; Cleveland State	W 85–78; L 73–88

=== NCAA Division II Tournament results ===
The Royals appeared in the NCAA Division II tournament fifteen times. Their combined record was 21–14.

Year	Round	Opponent	Result
1996	Regional semifinals Regional finals	High Point; Virginia Union	W 81–70; L 58–81
1998	Regional First round	Pittsburgh Johnstown	L 72–80
1999	Regional First round Regional semifinals	California (PA); Fairmont State	W 83–72; L 54–61
2001	Regional semifinals Regional finals Elite Eight	Longwood; Salem International; Western Washington	W 77–76; W 81–67; L 85–89
2003	Regional First round Regional semifinals Regional finals Elite Eight; Final Four	West Chester; Salem International; Millersville; Eckerd; Northeastern State (OK)	W 72–58; W 100–87; W 94–77; W 99–78; L 69–84
2007	Regional First round	Barton	L 76–85
2008	Regional First round	California (PA)	L 54–75
2011	Regional First round Regional semifinals	Limestone; Augusta State	W 70–67; L 60–71
2016	Regional First round Regional semifinals	Columbus State; Lincoln Memorial	W 94–84; L 67–95
2017	Regional First round Regional semifinals Regional finals	Wingate; Augusta; Lincoln Memorial	W 96–80; W 88–82; L 68–82
2018	Regional First round Regional semifinals Regional finals Elite Eight; Final Four	Lees-McRae; UNC Pembroke; Lincoln Memorial; California Baptist; Northern State (SD)	W 90–69; W 75–63; W 69–57; W 100–94; L 99–105^{2OT}
2019	Regional First round Regional semifinals Regional finals Elite Eight	Emmanuel; Catawba; Augusta; Point Loma Nazarene	W 76–72; W 96–93; W 91–78; L 74–87
2020	Regional First round	Southern Wesleyan	Cancelled
2021	Regional First round	Emmanuel	L 78–80
2022	Regional First round Regional semifinals Regional finals	Columbus State; Lincoln Memorial; Augusta	W 86–84; W 81–76; L 76–77

== See also ==
- Queens Royals women's basketball
