= Knights Hall =

Multi-purpose arena

- Interactive map of Knights Hall
- Address: 38.221759907759974, -85.70525617678341
- Location: 2001 Newburg Rd, Louisville, KY 40205
- Coordinates: 38°13′18″N 85°42′19″W
- Capacity: 2,283

Construction
- Opened: 1960

Tenants
- Bellarmine Knights (basketball, wrestling, volleyball)

Knights Hall is a 2,283-seat multi-purpose arena in Louisville, Kentucky, United States. It is located in The Highlands neighborhood on the campus of Bellarmine University The arena is home to the Bellarmine Knights men's basketball, women's basketball, wrestling, and women's volleyball teams.

The arena served as Bellarmine's basketball home from 1960 to 2020 before the COVID-19 pandemic forced a move to Freedom Hall due to need of spacing. Even after COVID-19 restrictions ended in 2022, the Knights remained at Freedom Hall through the 2023–24 season. On November 9, 2024, the Knights returned to Knights Hall for regular season basketball again.

== See also ==
- List of NCAA Division I basketball arenas
