= Swisher Gymnasium =

Multi-purpose arena in Jacksonville, Florida

- Interactive map of Swisher Gymnasium
- Location: 2800 University Blvd N, Jacksonville, Florida 32211
- Coordinates: 30°21′01″N 81°36′18″W
- Owner: Jacksonville University
- Operator: Jacksonville University
- Capacity: 1,360
- Surface: Multi-surface

Construction
- Built: 1953

Tenants
- Jacksonville Dolphins men's basketball (1953–1969, 1999–present); Jacksonville Dolphins women's basketball (1999–present)

Swisher Gymnasium is a 1,360-seat multi-purpose arena in Jacksonville, Florida. Built in 1953, it is the home to the Jacksonville University Dolphins men and women's basketball teams. Prior to the 2015–16 season, Jacksonville played its home games at both Swisher Gymnasium and the Jacksonville Veterans Memorial Arena.

In addition to athletic contests, Vice President of the United States Lyndon Baines Johnson addressed students in 1963 at the gymnasium. Swisher Gymnasium was also used for several concerts including Dionne Warwick (November 9, 1967), Billy Joel (March, 1975), and K.C. and the Sunshine Band (September 7, 1979). Swisher Gymnasium was also a contender as a site for one of the 2016 Presidential Debates, but was not selected as a finalist.

== See also ==
- List of NCAA Division I basketball arenas
