= Central Arkansas Bears basketball statistical leaders =

The Central Arkansas Bears basketball statistical leaders are individual statistical leaders of the Central Arkansas Bears basketball program in various categories, including points, rebounds, assists, steals, and blocks. Within those areas, the lists identify single-game, single-season, and career leaders. The Bears represent the University of Central Arkansas (UCA) in men's basketball as members of the NCAA Division I United Athletic Conference (UAC).

Central Arkansas began competing in intercollegiate basketball in 1920. It initially played in Amateur Athletic Union (AAU)-sponsored competitions, and later in the National Association of Intercollegiate Athletics (NAIA). UCA did not join the NCAA until 1993, playing in Division II until moving to Division I in 2006. This history is significant because the official recording of statistics began at different times in different organizations, as well as different NCAA divisions. The NAIA record books do not indicate when the organization began officially recording statistics on a national basis, but its current records (as of 2020–21) for single-game and single-season assists were both set in 1972–73, and the career record for blocks dates to 1975. By the time UCA joined the NCAA, that body had begun recording all major statistics on a national basis. (Note: The NCAA has recorded scoring statistics throughout the "modern era" of basketball, which it defines as starting with the 1937–38 season, the first after the center jump after each made field goal was abolished. Individual rebounding was first recorded in 1950–51. Other statistics were recorded during the following periods: Assists: First recorded in 1950–51 and 1951–52, before the first NCAA divisional split. Recording resumed in 1983–84 in Division I, and 1988–89 in both Division II and Division III.; Blocks and steals: Recorded since 1988–89 in D-I, and 1992–93 in both D-II and D-III.)

The UCA record books include players in all named statistics, regardless of whether they were officially recorded by any of the governing bodies in which the school was a member. These lists are updated through the end of the 2020–21 season.

== Scoring ==
Career
Rk	Player	Points	Seasons
1	Jordan Howard	2524	2014–15 2015–16 2016–17 2017–18
2	Clifton Bush	2157	1988–89 1989–90 1990–91 1991–92
3	Wally Love	1899	1976–77 1977–78 1978–79 1979–80
4	John Hutchcraft	1782	1971–72 1972–73 1973–74 1974–75
5	Eddy Kayouloud	1744	2018–19 2019–20 2020–21 2021–22 2022–23
6	Camren Hunter	1643	2021–22 2022–23 2025–26
7	Joe Couch	1609	1970–71 1971–72 1972–73 1973–74
8	Scottie Pippen	1600	1983–84 1984–85 1985–86 1986–87
9	Jim Pickett	1549	1972–73 1973–74 1974–75 1975–76
10	Barry Clark	1524	1975–76 1976–77 1977–78 1978–79

Season
Rk	Player	Points	Season
1	Jordan Howard	880	2017–18
2	Camren Hunter	714	2025–26
3	Clifton Bush	682	1990–91
4	Tom Davis	674	1964–65
5	Conny Johnson	649	1969–70
6	Clifton Bush	626	1991–92
7	Jordan Howard	623	2016–17
8	Ronnie Martin	618	1987–88
9	Derrell Washington	592	1993–94
10	Rodney Dean	590	1997–98
	Scottie Pippen	590	1986–87

Single game
Rk	Player	Points	Season	Opponent
1	Camren Hunter	49	2025–26	Queens
2	Derrell Washington	44	1993–94	Delta State
3	Jordan Howard	43	2017–18	Stephen F. Austin
	Jim Landers	43	1955–56	Arkansas State-Beebe
5	Conny Johnson	42	1969–70	Ozarks (Ark.)
6	Jordan Howard	41	2017–18	Incarnate Word
7	Rodney Dean	40	1998–99	Missouri Southern
	Jim Pickett	40	1973–74	Arkansas College
9	Nate Bowie	39	2007–08	Nicholls Colonels
	Jack Caperton	39	1929–30	Magnolia Aggies
	Bill McCurley	39	1952–53	Henderson State
	Scottie Pippen	39	1986–87	Harding

== Rebounds ==
Career
Rk	Player	Rebounds	Seasons
1	John Hutchcraft	1162	1971–72 1972–73 1973–74 1974–75
2	Wally Love	1059	1976–77 1977–78 1978–79 1979–80
3	Clifton Bush	848	1988–89 1989–90 1990–91 1991–92
4	Eddy Kayouloud	818	2018–19 2019–20 2020–21 2021–22 2022–23
5	Barry Clark	798	1975–76 1976–77 1977–78 1978–79
6	Joe Couch	791	1970–71 1971–72 1972–73 1973–74
7	Scottie Pippen	749	1983–84 1984–85 1985–86 1986–87
8	David Farmer	739	1971–72 1972–73 1973–74 1974–75
9	Mathieu Kamba	709	2014–15 2015–16 2016–17 2017–18
10	Zack Burks	708	1987–88 1988–89 1989–90 1990–91

Season
Rk	Player	Rebounds	Season
1	Tom Davis	383	1964–65
2	John Hutchcraft	327	1971–72
3	David Farmer	322	1973–74
4	David Farmer	320	1974–75
5	Wally Love	305	1976–77
6	John Hutchcraft	299	1972–73
7	Conny Johnson	286	1969–70
8	Clifton Bush	280	1990–91
	John Hutchcraft	280	1973–74
10	Wally Love	275	1977–78

Single game
Rk	Player	Rebounds	Season	Opponent
1	Wally Love	26	1976–77	Arkansas-Monticello
2	Tom Davis	24	1964–65	Southern State
3	Carl Beavers	23	1953–54	Southern State
4	John Hutchcraft	22	1973–74	Henderson State
5	John Hutchcraft	21	1971–72	Ozarks (Mo.)
	John Hutchcraft	21	1972–73	Ouachita Baptist
	Wally Love	21	1977–78	Evangel
8	David Farmer	20	1974–75	Hendrix
	Wally Love	20	1976–77	Harding
	Durrell Nevels	20	2007–08	Alabama A&M

== Assists ==
Career
Rk	Player	Assists	Seasons
1	DeAndre Jones	489	2017–18 2018–19 2019–20 2020–21
2	Russ Pennell	341	1982–83 1983–84
3	Jordan Howard	320	2014–15 2015–16 2016–17 2017–18
4	Camren Hunter	313	2021–22 2022–23 2025–26
5	Jeff Welch	309	1988–89 1989–90 1990–91
6	Clifton Bush	260	1988–89 1989–90 1990–91 1991–92
7	Scottie Pippen	253	1983–84 1984–85 1985–86 1986–87
8	Eddy Kayouloud	243	2018–19 2019–20 2020–21 2021–22 2022–23
9	Ronnie Martin	239	1984–85 1985–86 1986–87 1987–88
10	Dashonn Ford	233	1997–98 1998–99

Season
Rk	Player	Assists	Season
1	Henry Whitmore	225	1991–92
2	Russ Pennell	220	1983–84
3	Jeff Welch	183	1990–91
4	DeAndre Jones	162	2018–19
5	DeAndre Jones	159	2017–18
6	Phil Davis	154	1982–83
7	Brayden Fagbemi	146	2024–25
8	Lamar Grimes	143	2004–05
9	Mel Blackwood	134	1974–75
10	Johannes Kirsipuu	132	2023–24

Single game
Rk	Player	Assists	Season	Opponent
1	Henry Whitmore	15	1991–92	Hendrix
2	Cecil Stevenson	13	1984–85	Henderson State
	Henry Whitmore	13	1991–92	Henderson State
	Henry Whitmore	13	1991–92	Ozarks (Ark.)
	Johannes Kirsipuu	13	2023–24	Eastern Michigan
6	Russ Pennell	12	1983–84	Arkansas-Pine Bluff
	Johannes Kirsipuu	12	2023–24	Champion Christian
8	Rylan Bergerson	11	2017–18	Northwestern State
	Dion Cole	11	1994–95	Delta State
	Dashonn Ford	11	1998–99	Central Oklahoma
	Jordan Howard	11	2017–18	Morehead State
	Camren Hunter	11	2022–23	Little Rock
	Camren Hunter	11	2022–23	North Alabama
	DeAndre Jones	11	2017–18	Lamar University
	DeAndre Jones	11	2019–20	Mcneese St
	DeAndre Jones	11	2019–20	Sam Houston State
	DeAndre Jones	11	2019–20	Abilene Christian
	Russ Pennell	11	1983–84	Henderson State
	Jeff Welch	11	1990–91	Arkansas Tech

== Steals ==
Career
Rk	Player	Steals	Seasons
1	Clifton Bush	224	1988–89 1989–90 1990–91 1991–92
2	Scottie Pippen	186	1983–84 1984–85 1985–86 1986–87
3	Ronnie Martin	164	1984–85 1985–86 1986–87 1987–88
4	DeAndre Jones	161	2017–18 2018–19 2019–20 2020–21
5	Camren Hunter	138	2021–22 2022–23 2025–26
6	Rodney Dean	128	1997–98 1998–99
7	Shannon Lee	123	1996–97 1997–98 1998–99 2000–01
8	Zack Burks	112	1987–88 1988–89 1989–90 1990–91
	Dewan Clayborn	112	2008–09 2009–10 2010–11 2011–12
10	LaQuentin Miles	110	2011–12 2012–13 2013–14

Season
Rk	Player	Steals	Season
1	Scottie Pippen	78	1986–87
2	Ronnie Martin	76	1987–88
3	Henry Whitmore	74	1991–92
4	Rodney Dean	67	1997–98
5	Scottie Pippen	66	1985–86
	DeAndre Jones	66	2018–19
7	Ty Robinson	65	2025–26
8	Clifton Bush	62	1990–91
9	Rodney Dean	61	1998–99
10	DeAndre Jones	59	2017–18
	Clifton Bush	59	1991–92

Single game
Rk	Player	Steals	Season	Opponent
1	Dewan Clayborn	7	2009–10	Ecclesia
	Steven Delph	7	1988–89	Philander Smith
	Darryl Jones	7	2005–06	Missouri-Rolla
	Scottie Pippen	7	1986–87	Arkansas College
	Lee Stuart	7	1996–97	Christian Brothers
6	Aubrey Bruner	6	2005–06	Henderson State
	Zack Burks	6	1990–91	Harding
	Dashonn Ford	6	1998–99	Lincoln (Mo.)
	Willie Gross	6	1998–99	Arkansas Tech
	DeAndre Jones	6	2017–18	Sam Houston State
	DeAndre Jones	6	2018–19	Stephen F. Austin
	Chris Lee	6	1997–98	Delta State
	Shannon Lee	6	1998–99	Christian Brothers
	Scottie Pippen	6	1986–87	Arkansas-Monticello
	Scottie Pippen	6	1986–87	John Brown
	Cecil Stevenson	6	1984–85	Harding
	Jeff Welch	6	1990–91	Hendrix
	Henry Whitmore	6	1991–92	Henderson State

== Blocks ==
Career
Rk	Player	Blocks	Seasons
1	Hayden Koval	272	2017–18 2018–19 2019–20
2	Durrell Nevels	148	2006–07 2007–08
3	Joe Sitkowski	100	1988–89 1989–90 1990–91 1991–92
4	Jake Zuilhof	86	2014–15 2015–16
	Mathieu Kamba	86	2014–15 2015–16 2016–17 2017–18
6	Scottie Pippen	80	1983–84 1984–85 1985–86 1986–87
7	Elias Cato	76	2021–22 2022–23 2023–24 2024–25
8	Anthony Borden	75	2011–12 2012–13
	Fernando Johnson	75	2004–05 2005–06 2006–07
10	Zack Burks	71	1987–88 1988–89 1989–90 1990–91

Season
Rk	Player	Blocks	Season
1	Hayden Koval	105	2017–18
2	Durrell Nevels	99	2006–07
3	Hayden Koval	95	2019–20
4	Hayden Koval	72	2018–19
5	Tadre Sheppard	51	2009–10
6	Durrell Nevels	49	2007–08
	Joe Sitkowski	49	1990–91
	Jake Zuilhof	49	2014–15
9	Fernando Johnson	46	2006–07
10	Anthony Borden	40	2012–13

Single game
Rk	Player	Blocks	Season	Opponent
1	Hayden Koval	11	2017–18	HBU
2	Hayden Koval	8	2018–19	Houston Baptist
3	Fernando Johnson	7	2006–07	Fairfield
	Hayden Koval	7	2017–18	SC State
	Hayden Koval	7	2017–18	Texas A&M-Corpus Chr
	Hayden Koval	7	2018–19	New Orleans
	Hayden Koval	7	2019–20	Abilene Christian
	Durrell Nevels	7	2006–07	Lamar University
	Durrell Nevels	7	2006–07	Northwestern State
10	Hayden Koval	6	2017–18	Abilene Christian
	Hayden Koval	6	2017–18	Seattle University
	Hayden Koval	6	2017–18	Incarnate Word
	Hayden Koval	6	2018–19	Lyon
	Hayden Koval	6	2018–19	Nicholls
	Hayden Koval	6	2018–19	Abilene Christian
	Hayden Koval	6	2019–20	California Baptist
	Hayden Koval	6	2019–20	Marquette
	Durrell Nevels	6	2006–07	Lamar University
	Durrell Nevels	6	2006–07	Central Methodist
	Durrell Nevels	6	2006–07	Texas College
