= Atlantic Sun Conference Men's Basketball Player of the Year =

ASUN Conference Men's Basketball Player of the Year
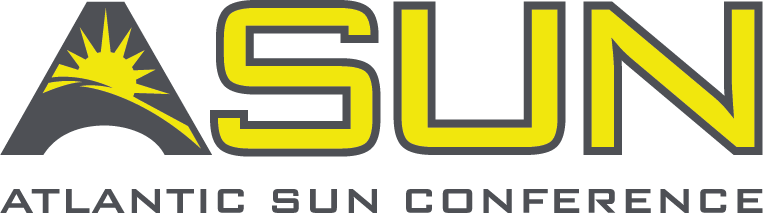
- Awarded for: the most outstanding basketball player in the Atlantic Sun Conference
- Country: United States

History
- First award: 1979
- Most recent: Camren Hunter, Central Arkansas

The Atlantic Sun Conference Men's Basketball Player of the Year is an annual award given to the most outstanding player in the Atlantic Sun Conference (ASUN; officially the "ASUN Conference" from 2016–2023). The award was first given following the 1978–79 season, the first year of the ASUN's existence, when it was known as the Trans America Athletic Conference (TAAC). Only two players have won the award three times: Willie Jackson of Centenary (1982–1984) and Darius McGhee of Liberty (2021–2023).

Centenary has the most all-time winners with six, but left the conference in 2000, when the league was still known as the TAAC. There has been only one tie in the award's history, which occurred in 1997–98 between Mark Jones of UCF and Sedric Webber of Charleston.

Among the eight current ASUN members, only three have had a winner: Florida Gulf Coast (FGCU), Lipscomb, and North Florida. Lipscomb has had three awards, all won by different players; FGCU has had two awards and individual recipients; and North Florida has had one player receive two awards.

== Key ==
†	Co-Players of the Year
*	Awarded a national player of the year award that same season: Helms Foundation College Basketball Player of the Year (1904–05 to 1978–79); UPI College Basketball Player of the Year (1954–55 to 1995–96); Oscar Robertson Trophy (1958–59 to present); Naismith College Player of the Year (1968–69 to present); John R. Wooden Award (1976–77 to present)
Player (X)	Denotes the number of times the player has been named ASUN Player of the Year at that point

== Winners ==
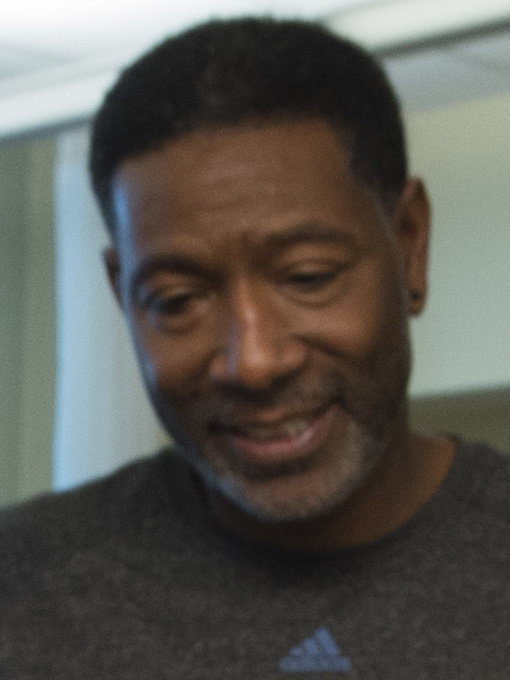
Sam Mitchell, Mercer, 1985

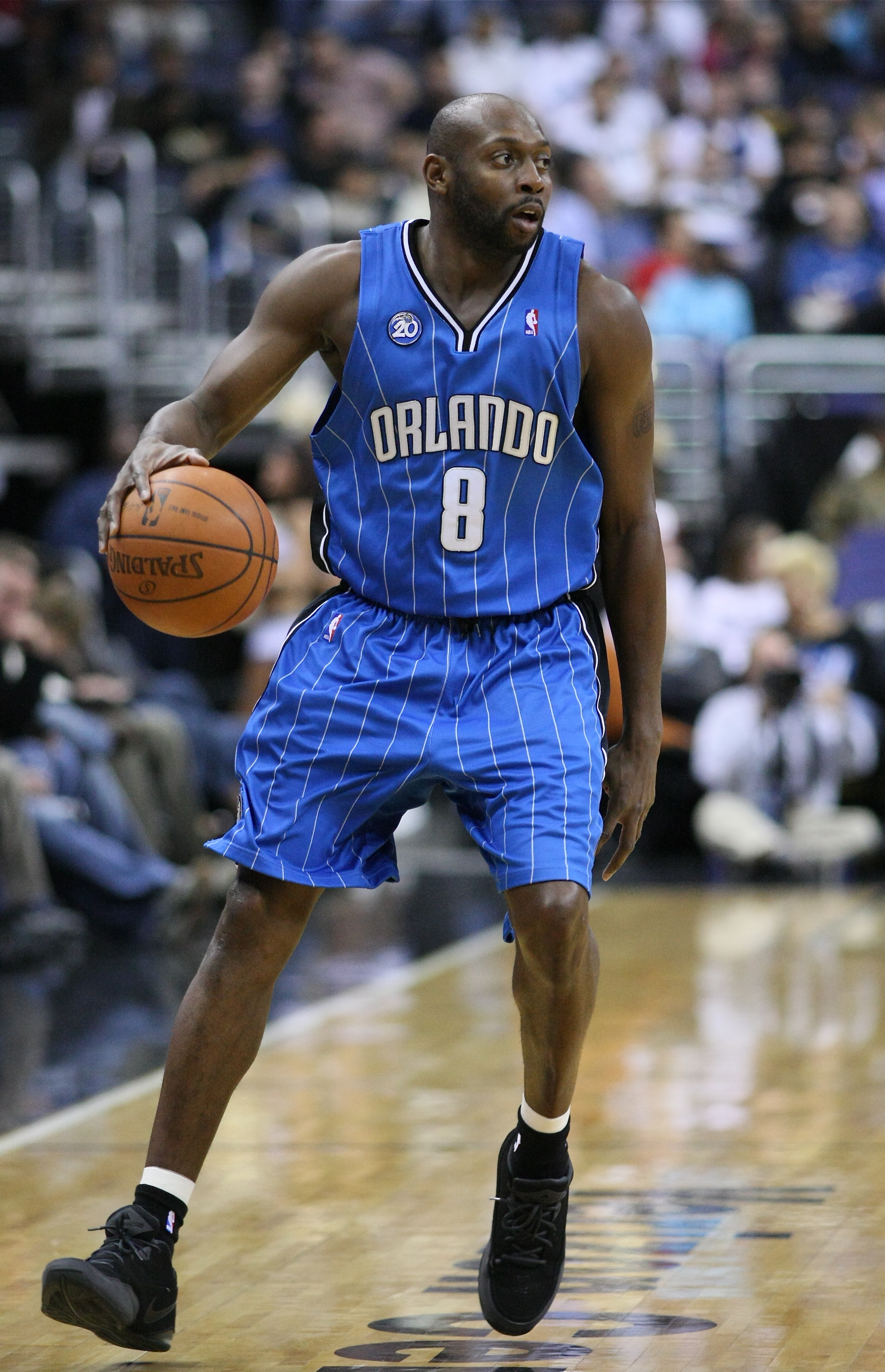
Anthony Johnson, Charleston, 1997

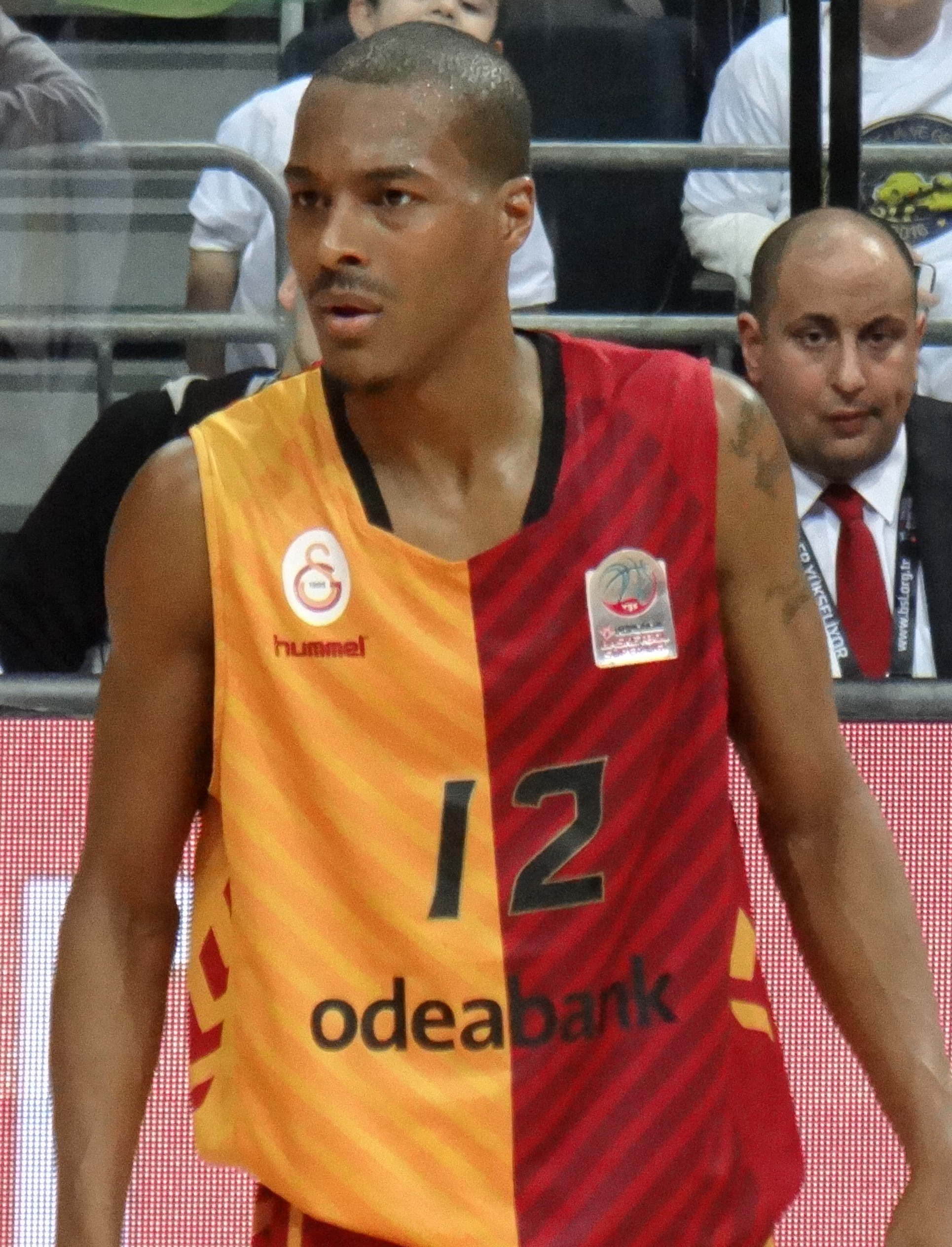
Alex Renfroe, Belmont, 2009

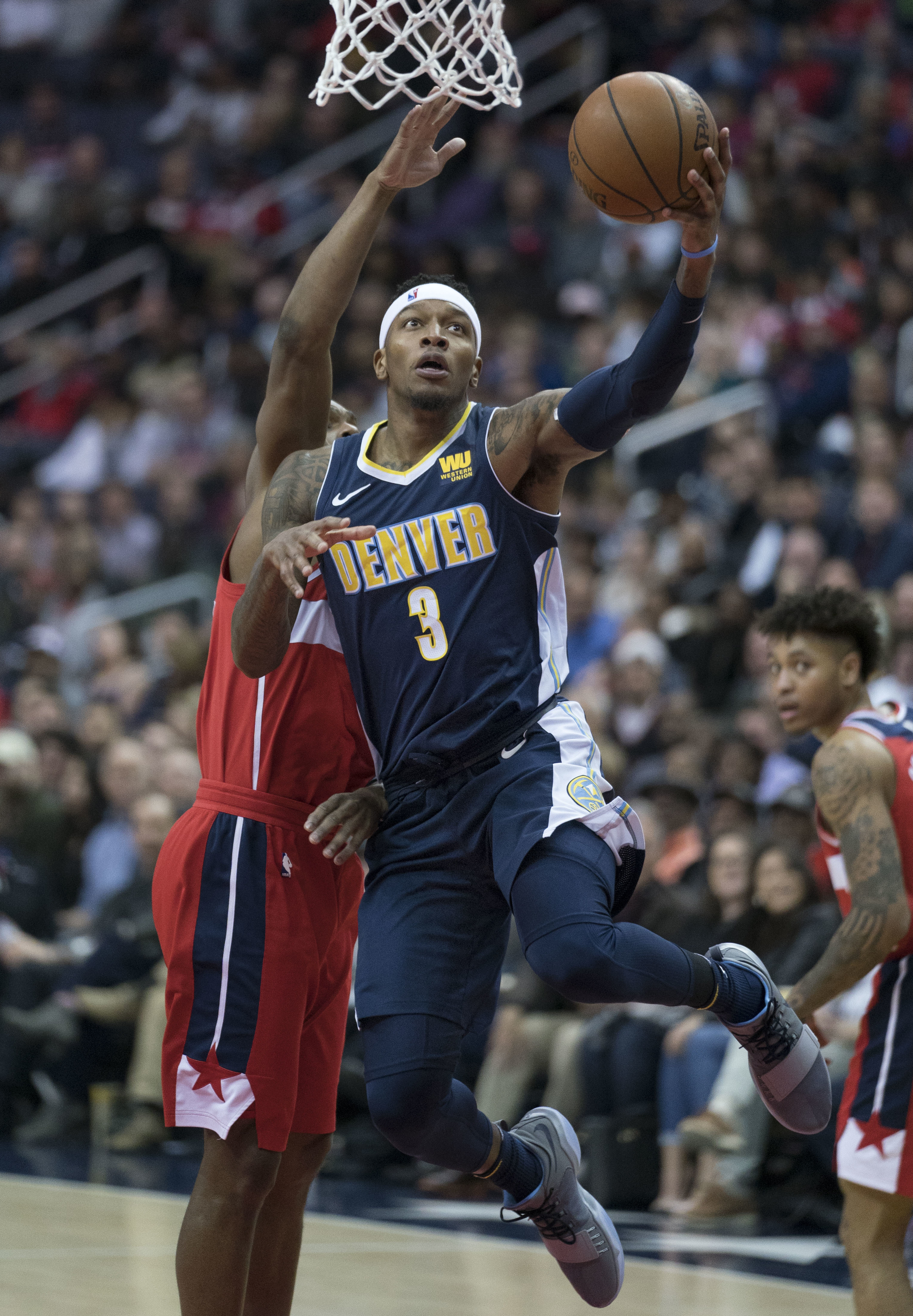
Torrey Craig, USC Upstate, 2012

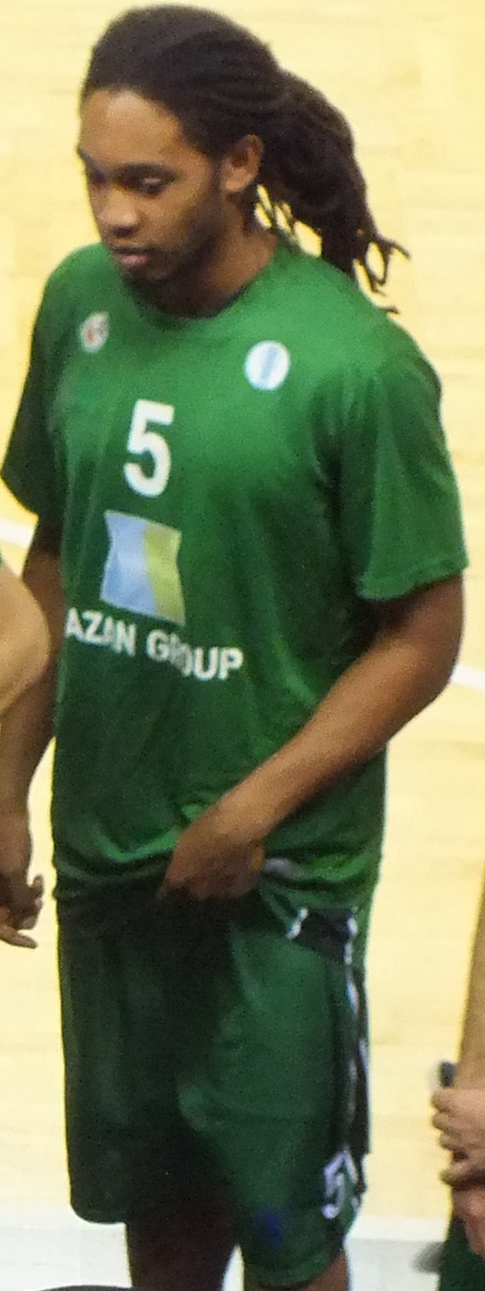
Sherwood Brown, Florida Gulf Coast, 2013

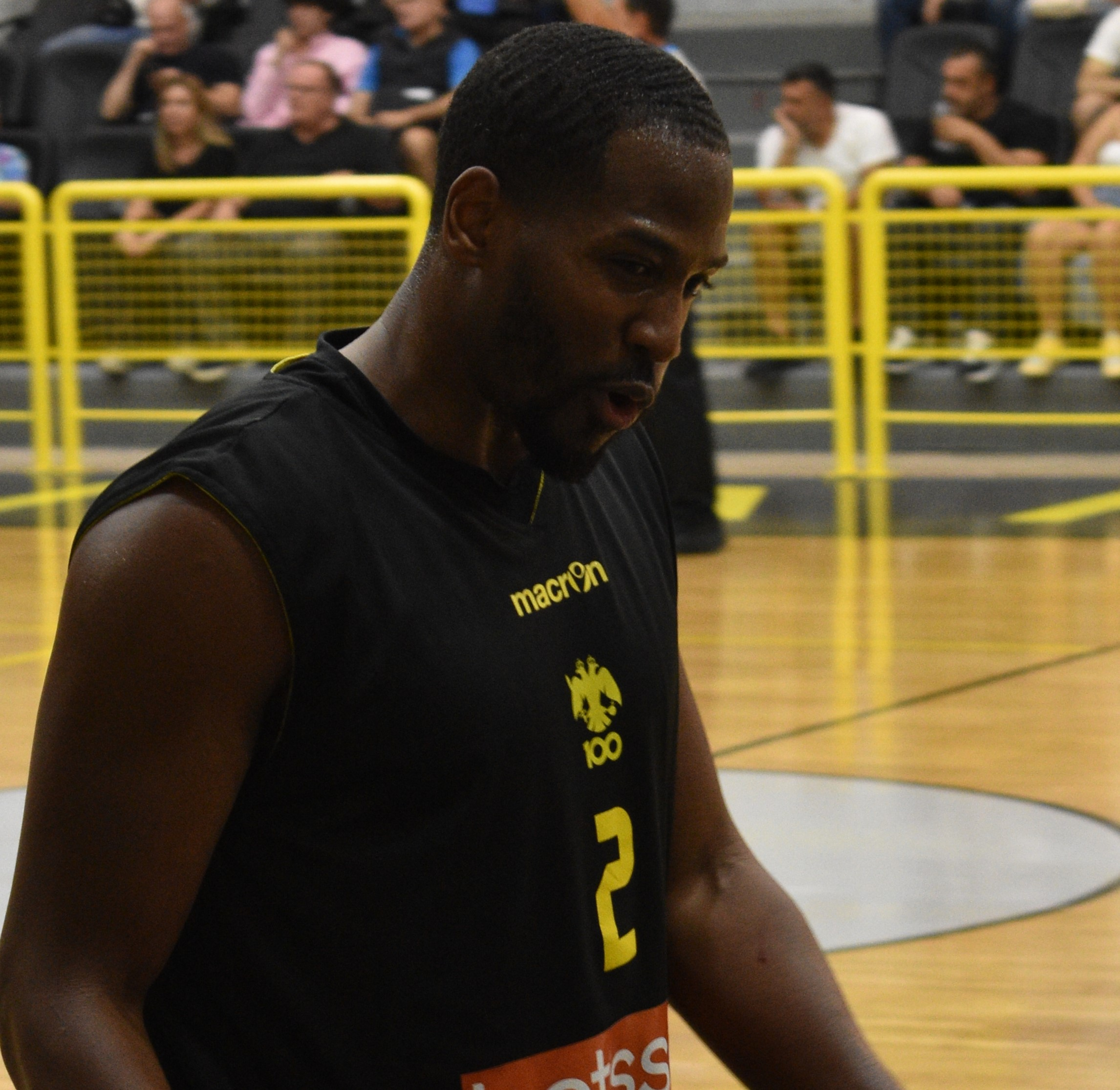
Langston Hall, Mercer, 2014

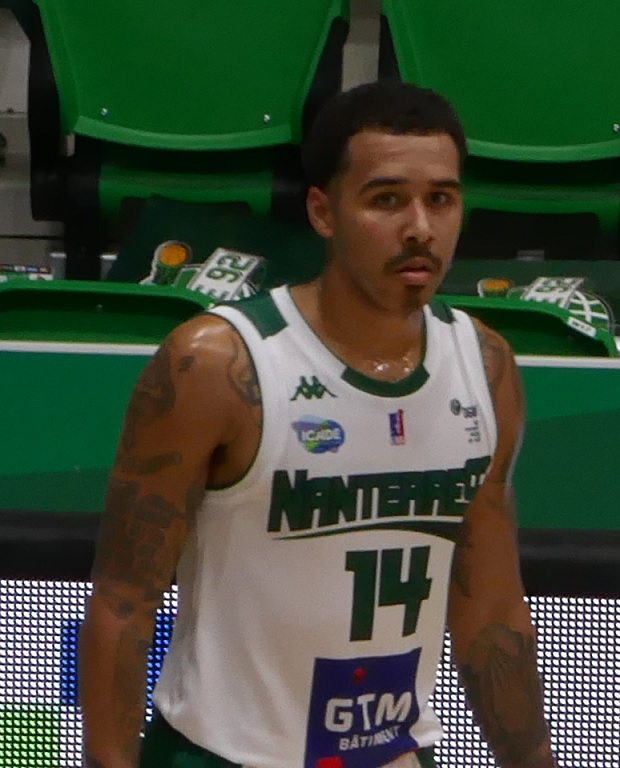
Dallas Moore, North Florida, 2016 and 2017

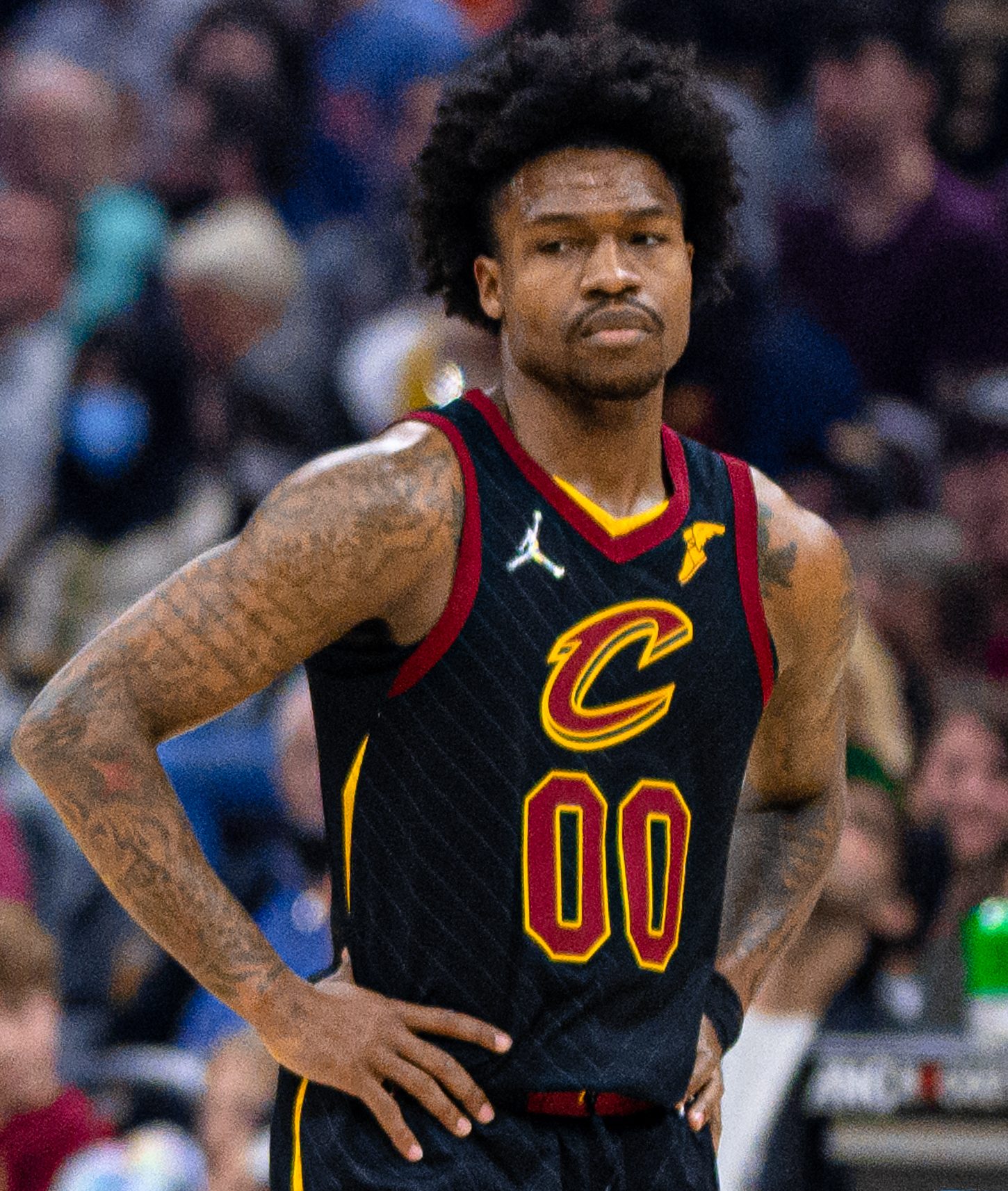
Brandon Goodwin, Florida Gulf Coast, 2018

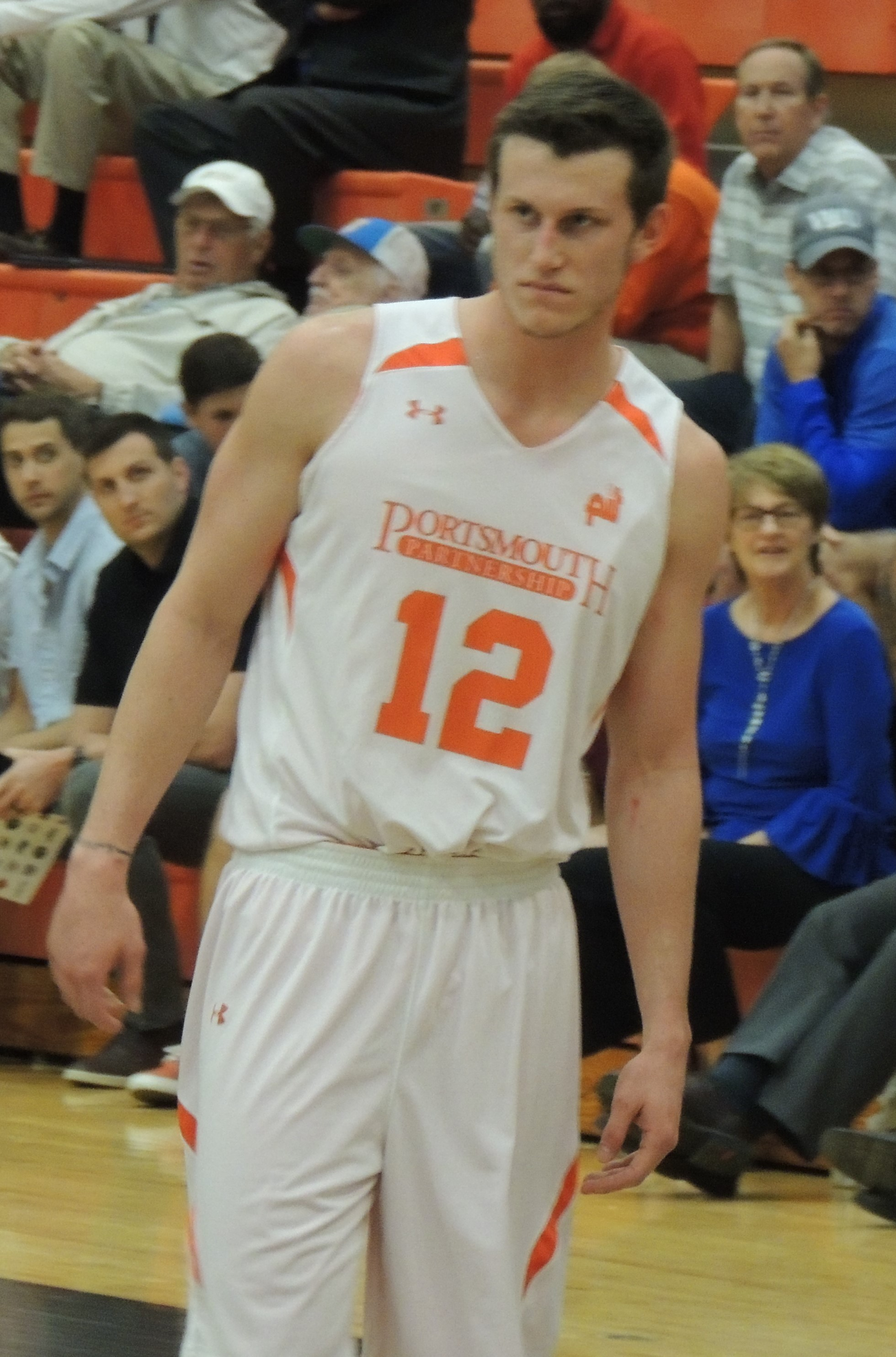
Garrison Mathews, Lipscomb, 2019

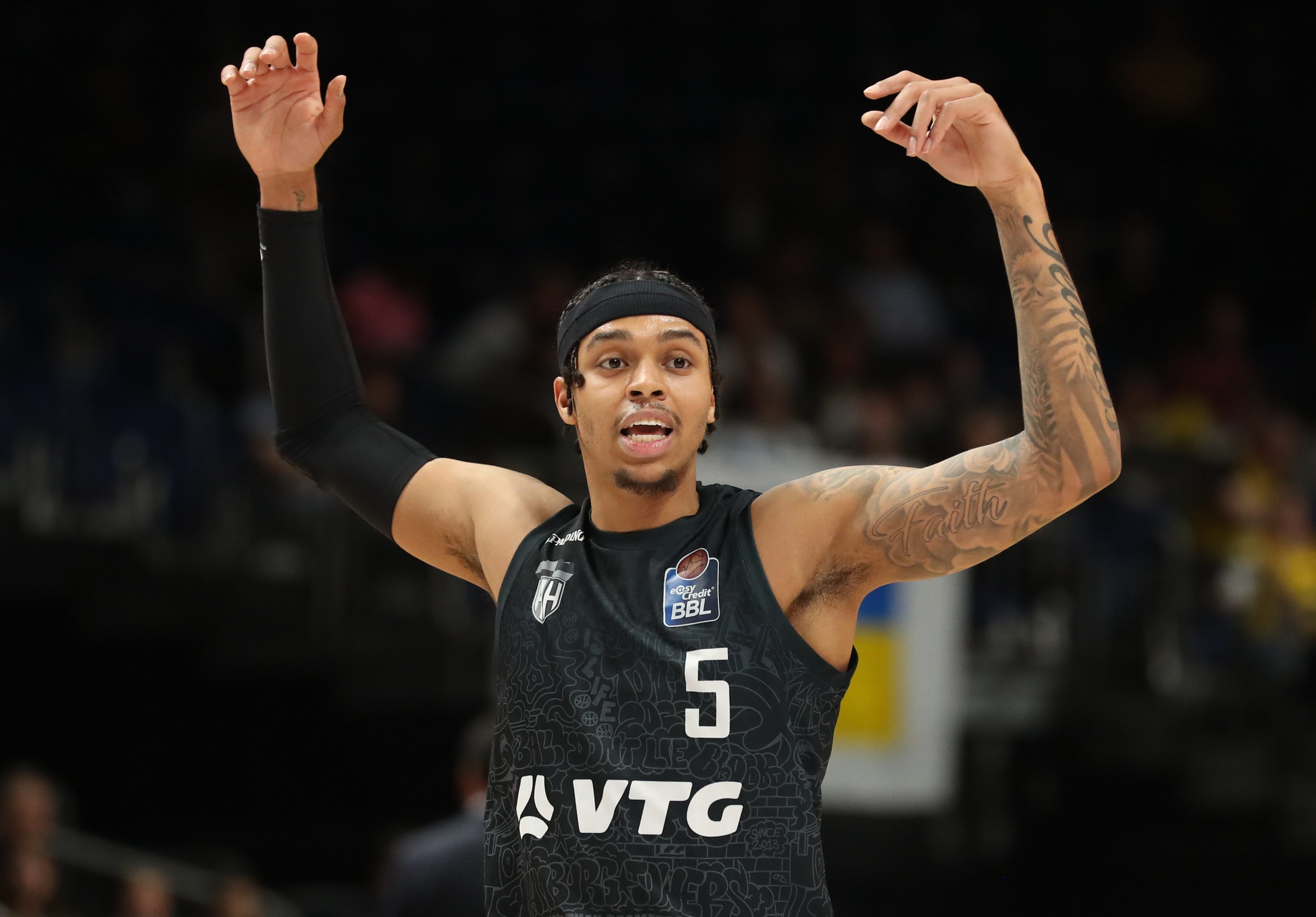
Caleb Homesley, Liberty, 2020

Season	Player	School	Position	Class	Reference
1978–79	Calvin Natt	Louisiana–Monroe	SF	Senior	
1979–80	George Lett	Centenary	F	Senior	
1980–81	Benton Wade	Mercer	PF	Senior	
1981–82	Willie Jackson	Centenary	F	Sophomore	
1982–83	Willie Jackson (2)	Centenary	F	Junior	
1983–84	Willie Jackson (3)	Centenary	F	Senior	
1984–85	Sam Mitchell	Mercer	SF	Senior	
1985–86	Myron Jackson	Little Rock	PG / SG	Junior	
1986–87	Brian Newton	Georgia Southern	SF	Senior	
1987–88	Jeff Sanders	Georgia Southern	C	Junior	
1988–89	Jeff Sanders (2)	Georgia Southern	C	Senior	
1989–90	Larry Robinson	Centenary	SG	Senior	
1990–91	Patrick Greer	Centenary	PG	Senior	
1991–92	Tony Windless	Georgia Southern	SF	Senior	
1992–93	Kenny Brown	Mercer	G	Senior	
1993–94	Marion Busby	Charleston	G	Junior	
1994–95	Kerry Blackshear	Stetson	SG / SF	Junior	
1995–96	Thaddeus Delaney	Charleston	C	Junior	
1996–97	Anthony Johnson	Charleston	PG / SG	Senior	
1997–98^{†}	Mark Jones	UCF	SG	Senior	
1997–98^{†}	Sedric Webber	Charleston	PF	Junior	
1998–99	Reed Rawlings	Samford	PF	Junior	
1999–00	Detric Golden	Troy	PG	Sophomore	
2000–01	Shernard Long	Georgia State	SG / SF	Senior	
2001–02	Thomas Terrell	Georgia State	F	Junior	
2002–03	Adam Sonn	Belmont	PF / SF	Senior	
2003–04	Greg Davis	Troy	PG / SG	Senior	
2004–05	Mike Bell	Florida Atlantic	F	Senior	
2005–06	Tim Smith	East Tennessee State	PG	Senior	
2006–07	Courtney Pigram	East Tennessee State	PG	Sophomore	
2007–08	Thomas Sanders	Gardner–Webb	PG	Senior	
2008–09	Alex Renfroe	Belmont	PG	Senior	
2009–10	Adnan Hodžić	Lipscomb	C	Junior	
2010–11	Mike Smith	East Tennessee State	SG	Senior	
2011–12	Torrey Craig	USC Upstate	PF	Sophomore	
2012–13	Sherwood Brown	Florida Gulf Coast	SG	Senior	
2013–14	Langston Hall	Mercer	PG	Senior	
2014–15	Ty Greene	USC Upstate	SG	Senior	
2015–16	Dallas Moore	North Florida	PG	Junior	
2016–17	Dallas Moore (2)	North Florida	PG	Senior	
2017–18	Brandon Goodwin	Florida Gulf Coast	PG	Senior	
2018–19	Garrison Mathews	Lipscomb	SG	Senior	
2019–20	Caleb Homesley	Liberty	SG	Senior	
2020–21	Darius McGhee	Liberty	SG	Junior	
2021–22	Darius McGhee (2)	Liberty	SG	Senior	
2022–23	Darius McGhee (3)	Liberty	SG	Graduate	
2023–24	Isaiah Cozart	Eastern Kentucky	C	Senior	
2024–25	Jacob Ognacevic	Lipscomb	PF	Senior	
2025–26	Camren Hunter	Central Arkansas	SG	Senior	

== Winners by school ==
School (year joined)	Winners	Years
Centenary (1978) (Note: Centenary College of Louisiana left in 2000 and went independent. The Gents (and Ladies) have since dropped from Division I, and are now in the Division III Southern Collegiate Athletic Conference.)	6	1980, 1982, 1983, 1984, 1990, 1991
Charleston (1992) (Note: Charleston left in 1998 to join the Southern Conference (SoCon), and is now in the Coastal Athletic Association (CAA).)	4	1994, 1996, 1997, 1998^{†}
Georgia Southern (1980) (Note: Georgia Southern University left in 1992 to join the SoCon, and is now in the Sun Belt Conference.)	4	1987, 1988, 1989, 1992
Liberty (2018) (Note: Liberty University left for Conference USA in 2023.)	4	2020, 2021, 2022, 2023
Mercer (1978) (Note: East Tennessee State University and Mercer University left in 2014 to join the SoCon.)	4	1981, 1985, 1993, 2014
East Tennessee State (2005)	3	2006, 2007, 2011
Lipscomb (2007)	3	2010, 2019, 2025
Belmont (2001) (Note: Belmont University left in 2012 to join the Ohio Valley Conference, and moved to the Missouri Valley Conference in 2022.)	2	2003, 2009
Florida Gulf Coast (2007)	2	2013, 2018
Georgia State (1984) (Note: Georgia State University left in 2005 to join the CAA, and is now in the Sun Belt.)	2	2001, 2002
North Florida (2005)	2	2016, 2017
Troy (1997) (Note: Troy University left in 2005 to join the Sun Belt.)	2	2000, 2004
USC Upstate (2007) (Note: The University of South Carolina Upstate (USC Upstate) left in 2018 to join the Big South Conference.)	2	2012, 2015
Central Arkansas (2021) (Note: Austin Peay, Central Arkansas, Eastern Kentucky, North Alabama, and West Georgia, all of which had been members of the football-only United Athletic Conference (UAC) through the 2025 football season, left after the 2025–26 season when the Western Athletic Conference rebranded as the UAC and took over the WAC's role as an all-sports conference.)	1	2026
Eastern Kentucky (2021)	1	2024
Little Rock (1980) (Note: The University of Arkansas at Little Rock left in 1991 to join the Sun Belt, joined the Ohio Valley Conference in 2022, and joined the UAC in 2026.)	1	1986
UCF (1992) (Note: The University of Central Florida left in 2005 to join Conference USA (CUSA), moved to the American Athletic Conference in 2013, and joined the Big 12 Conference in 2023.)	1	1998^{†}
Florida Atlantic (1993) (Note: Florida Atlantic University left in 2006 to join the Sun Belt, and moved to CUSA in 2013 and the American in 2023.)	1	2005
Gardner–Webb (2002) (Note: Gardner–Webb University left in 2008 to join the Big South Conference.)	1	2008
Louisiana–Monroe (1978) (Note: The University of Louisiana at Monroe left in 1983 to join the Southland Conference, and is now in the Sun Belt.)	1	1979
Austin Peay (2022)	0	—
Bellarmine (2020)	0	—
Campbell (1994) (Note: Campbell University left in 2011 to rejoin its pre-1994 home of the Big South Conference, and moved to the CAA in 2023.)	0	—
Jacksonville (1997)	0	—
Jacksonville State (1995, 2021) (Note: Jacksonville State University left in 2003 to join the Ohio Valley Conference, rejoined the ASUN in 2021, and left again in 2023 for Conference USA.)	0	—
Kennesaw State (2005) (Note: Kennesaw State University left in 2024 to join Conference USA.)	0	—
NJIT (2015) (Note: NJIT left in 2020 to join the America East Conference.)	0	—
North Alabama (2018)	0	—
Northern Kentucky (2012) (Note: Northern Kentucky left for the Horizon League in 2015.)	0	—
Oklahoma City (1978) (Note: Oklahoma City University was a charter TAAC member in 1978, but was only a member in the first season of 1978–79. The Chiefs, now the Stars, left to become a charter member of the Midwestern City Conference (now the Horizon League). Oklahoma City left the NCAA altogether in 1985, and is now a member of the NAIA Sooner Athletic Conference.)	0	—
Queens (2022)	0	—
Stetson (1985)	0	—
West Florida (2026)	0	—
West Georgia (2024)	0	—
