= Darius McGhee =

American basketball player (born 1999)

- McGhee with Lleida in 2026

No. 0 – Força Lleida
- Position: Point guard
- League: Liga ACB

Personal information
- Born: June 2, 1999 (age 27) Roxboro, North Carolina, U.S.
- Listed height: 5 ft 9 in (1.75 m)
- Listed weight: 160 lb (73 kg)

Career information
- High school: Roxboro Community School (Roxboro, North Carolina); Blue Ridge School (Saint George, Virginia)
- College: Liberty (2018–2023)
- NBA draft: 2023: undrafted
- Playing career: 2023–present

Career history
- 2023–2024: Indiana Mad Ants
- 2024–2025: Telekom Baskets Bonn
- 2025–2026: JL Bourg
- 2026–present: Força Lleida

Career highlights
- EuroCup champion (2026); All-EuroCup Second Team (2026); 3× ASUN Player of the Year (2021–2023); 3× First-team All-ASUN (2021–2023); ASUN tournament MVP (2021)
- Stats at NBA.com
- Stats at Basketball Reference

Darius McGhee (born June 2, 1999) is an American professional basketball player for Força Lleida of the Liga ACB. He played college basketball for the Liberty Flames where he won the ASUN Conference Player of the Year Award three times.

== High school career ==
McGhee attended Roxboro Community School in Roxboro, North Carolina for three years. His sophomore season was cut short after he broke his arm. As a junior, McGhee emerged as one of the top scorers in the nation. He averaged 36.4 per game, leading the state in scoring, and became the first player in state history to score at least 1,000 points in a single season. McGhee transferred to Blue Ridge School in Saint George, Virginia and helped his team win the VISAA Division II state title.

== College career ==
As a freshman at Liberty, McGhee averaged 7.8 points per game. He averaged 9.5 points and four rebounds per game as a sophomore. On February 27, 2021, McGhee scored a season-high 34 points in a 94–78 win over Bellarmine, matching the program record of eight three-pointers, to claim the ASUN regular season title. He was named ASUN Player of the Year and was a unanimous First Team All-ASUN selection. On March 7, McGhee posted 21 points and eight rebounds in a 79–75 victory over North Alabama at the ASUN tournament final. He was named tournament MVP. As a junior, McGhee averaged 15.5 points, 2.1 assists and 4.4 rebounds per game. On January 15, 2022, he scored a school-record 48 points, including 37 in the second half, in a 78–75 win against Florida Gulf Coast. On February 26, McGhee scored 47 points in a 100–93 overtime win against Kennesaw State. At the close of the 2021–22 season, McGhee was again named ASUN Player of the Year. His 142 three pointers in 2021 is 12th most ever in a single season for Division I basketball.

During his final season of eligibility, McGhee reached several major statistical milestones. First, on November 26, 2022, he passed the 2,000-point milestone for his career. Then, on February 4, 2023, he became the Flames' all-time leading scorer, surpassing Karl Hess, who had played for the Flames from 1976 to 1980 when Liberty was an NAIA member. On February 22, he became the ASUN's all-time scoring leader, surpassing Willie Jackson, who played for Centenary from 1980 to 1984 when the ASUN was known as the Trans America Athletic Conference. In the same game, he also became the fourth Division I men's player to score 500 three-pointers in his career. (Note: In Division I women's basketball, Taylor Robertson of Oklahoma, whose college career has coincided with McGhee's, has also made 500 threes.) On February 27, 2023, McGhee was named the ASUN Player of the Year for the third consecutive season, joining Centenary's Jackson as the only players in league history to earn the award that many times. He was also named to a third consecutive all-conference first team selection. He ended the season with 162 three-pointers, tying Stephen Curry's NCAA single-season record set in 2008.

== Professional career ==
=== Indiana Mad Ants ===
After going undrafted in the 2023 NBA draft, McGhee joined the Indiana Pacers for the 2023 NBA Summer League and on October 17, 2023, he signed with them. However, he was waived the next day. On October 28, 2023, he joined the Indiana Mad Ants.

=== Telekom Baskets Bonn ===
On June 10, 2024, McGhee signed with Telekom Baskets Bonn of the German Basketball Bundesliga (BBL). Over the BBL season, McGhee led Bonn in scoring (15.5 PPG) and assists (4.2 APG), though his team missed the playoffs.

=== JL Bourg ===
On June 14, 2025, he signed with JL Bourg of the LNB Pro A.

=== Força Lleida ===
On July 29, 2026, he signed with Força Lleida of the Liga ACB.

== Career statistics ==
Legend
GP	Games played	GS	Games started	MPG	Minutes per game
FG%	Field goal percentage	3P%	3-point field goal percentage	FT%	Free throw percentage
RPG	Rebounds per game	APG	Assists per game	SPG	Steals per game
BPG	Blocks per game	PPG	Points per game	**Bold**	Career high

=== College ===
Year	Team	GP	GS	MPG	FG%	3P%	FT%	RPG	APG	SPG	BPG	PPG
2018–19	Liberty	**36**	0	21.3	.384	.319	**.909**	2.7	1.1	.9	.3	7.8
2019–20	Liberty	34	34	33.0	.437	.386	.830	4.0	1.7	.9	.1	9.5
2020–21	Liberty	29	29	30.2	.452	**.408**	.854	4.4	2.1	.8	**.4**	15.5
2021–22	Liberty	33	33	**33.7**	**.456**	.390	.881	**4.5**	**3.6**	1.2	.2	**24.6**
2022–23	Liberty	**36**	**36**	31.9	.439	.394	.867	3.3	3.0	**1.6**	.2	22.8
Career		168	132	29.9	.439	.384	.868	3.7	2.3	1.1	.2	16.0

=== NBA G League ===
Year	Team	GP	GS	MPG	FG%	3P%	FT%	RPG	APG	SPG	BPG	PPG
2023-24	Mad Ants	22	0	13.4	.382	.347	.875	1.2	2.3	0.6	0.2	7.1

== See also ==
- List of NCAA Division I men's basketball career 3-point scoring leaders
- List of NCAA Division I men's basketball season 3-point field goal leaders
- List of NCAA Division I men's basketball career games played leaders
