= Kerry Blackshear =

Kerry Blackshear may refer to:

- Kerry Blackshear Sr. (born 1973), American former professional basketball player
- Kerry Blackshear Jr. (born 1997), American professional basketball player
