= Stetson Hatters men's basketball statistical leaders =

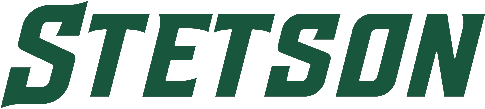

The Stetson Hatters men's basketball statistical leaders are individual statistical leaders of the Stetson Hatters men's basketball program in various categories including points, assists, blocks, rebounds, and steals. Within those areas, the lists identify single-game, single-season, and career leaders. As of the next college basketball season in 2024–25, the Hatters represent Stetson University in the NCAA Division I ASUN Conference.

Stetson began competing in intercollegiate basketball in 1900. However, the school's record book does not generally list records from before the 1950s, as records from before this period are often incomplete and inconsistent. Since scoring was much lower in this era, and teams played much fewer games during a typical season, it is likely that few or no players from this era would appear on these lists anyway.

The NCAA did not officially record assists as a stat until the 1983–84 season, and blocks and steals until the 1985–86 season, but Stetson's record books includes players in these stats before these seasons. These lists are updated through the end of the 2023–24 season.

== Scoring ==
Career
Rk	Player	Points	Seasons
1	Divine Myles	1845	2014–15 2015–16 2016–17 2017–18
2	Kerry Blackshear	1826	1992–93 1993–94 1994–95 1995–96
3	E.J. Gordon	1691	2002–03 2003–04 2004–05 2005–06
4	Randy Anderson	1652	1985–86 1986–87 1987–88 1988–89
5	Garfield Blair	1582	2005–06 2006–07 2007–08 2008–09
6	Ron Beal	1559	1968–69 1969–70 1970–71 1971–72
7	Dalton Epting	1548	1958–59 1959–60 1960–61 1961–62
8	Joel Hancock	1539	1958–59 1959–60 1960–61 1961–62
9	Christian Jones	1532	2017–18 2018–19 2019–20 2020–21 2021–22
10	Frank Burnell	1491	1979–80 1980–81 1981–82 1982–83

Season
Rk	Player	Points	Season
1	Earnest Killum	741	1969–70
2	Jalen Blackmon	730	2023–24
3	Mark Brisker	633	1991–92
4	Earnest Killum	630	1968–69
5	Gene Wells	622	1958–59
6	Mark Brisker	603	1990–91
7	Maurice Cowan	596	1989–90
8	Derick Newton	568	2016–17
9	Frank Burnell	556	1982–83
10	Joel Hancock	554	1961–62

Single game
Rk	Player	Points	Season	Opponent
1	Mel Daniels	48	1976–77	UNC Wilmington

== Rebounds ==
Career
Rk	Player	Rebounds	Seasons
1	Ken Showers	980	1967–68 1968–69 1969–70 1970–71
2	Randy Anderson	967	1985–86 1986–87 1987–88 1988–89
3	Santos Hampton	932	1998–99 1999–00 2000–01 2001–02
4	Dalton Epting	826	1958–59 1959–60 1960–61 1961–62
5	Bill Hester	775	1961–62 1962–63 1963–64 1964–65
6	Brian Pegg	764	2012–13 2013–14 2014–15 2015–16 2016–17
7	Sebastian Singletary	754	1998–99 1999–00 2000–01
8	Bill Schneider	732	1956–57 1957–58 1958–59 1959–60
9	Ron Beal	702	1968–69 1969–70 1970–71 1971–72
10	E.J. Gordon	690	2002–03 2003–04 2004–05 2005–06

Season
Rk	Player	Rebounds	Season
1	Ralph Miller	360	1958–59
2	Ken Showers	351	1970–71
3	Brian Pegg	332	2015–16
4	Dalton Epting	327	1960–61
5	Lorenzo Williams	312	1990–91
6	Randy Anderson	311	1986–87
7	Ken Showers	302	1968–69
8	Lamar Deaver	300	1962–63
9	Mac Stones	298	1955–56
10	Mel Daniels	285	1976–77

Single game
Rk	Player	Rebounds	Season	Opponent
1	Ralph Miller	25	1957–58	Pikeville

== Assists ==
Career
Rk	Player	Assists	Seasons
1	Stephan Swenson	602	2020–21 2021–22 2022–23 2023–24
2	Angel Rivera	582	2014–15 2015–16 2016–17 2017–18
3	Frank Ireland	526	1987–88 1988–89 1989–90 1990–91
4	Brad Weston	517	1978–79 1979–80 1980–81 1981–82
5	Terry Johnson	507	1985–86 1986–87 1987–88 1988–89
6	Divine Myles	501	2014–15 2015–16 2016–17 2017–18
7	Ravii Givens	454	1999–00 2000–01 2001–02 2002–03
8	Buzzy O'Connell	390	1973–74 1974–75 1975–76 1976–77
9	Rob Wilkes	369	1989–90 1990–91 1991–92 1992–93
10	Glenn Wilkes	348	1976–77 1977–78 1978–79 1979–80

Season
Rk	Player	Assists	Season
1	Stephan Swenson	201	2023–24
2	Terry Johnson	179	1986–87
3	Ravii Givens	173	2000–01
4	Frank Ireland	171	1989–90
5	Angel Rivera	162	2016–17
	Buzzy O'Connell	162	1976–77
7	Angel Rivera	150	2017–18
	Angel Rivera	150	2015–16
9	Calvin Sirmans III	148	2025–26
10	Brad Weston	145	1981–82

Single game
Rk	Player	Assists	Season	Opponent
1	Angel Rivera	15	2017–18	Webber
	Brad Weston	15	1981–82	Louisiana

== Steals ==
Career
Rk	Player	Steals	Seasons
1	E.J. Gordon	235	2002–03 2003–04 2004–05 2005–06
2	Anthony Register	172	2002–03 2003–04 2004–05 2005–06
3	Divine Myles	159	2014–15 2015–16 2016–17 2017–18
4	Stephan Swenson	158	2020–21 2021–22 2022–23 2023–24
5	Alexis McMillan	156	2001–02 2002–03
6	Kerry Blackshear	152	1992–93 1993–94 1994–95 1995–96
	Christian Jones	152	2017–18 2018–19 2019–20 2020–21 2021–22
8	Ravii Givens	150	1999–00 2000–01 2001–02 2002–03
9	Gabe McMillen	149	2003–04 2004–05 2005–06 2006–07
10	Kris Thomas	135	2005–06 2006–07 2007–08 2008–09

Season
Rk	Player	Steals	Season
1	Alexis McMillan	87	2002–03
2	Alexis McMillan	69	2001–02
3	E.J. Gordon	66	2003–04
4	Anthony Register	64	2005–06
5	E.J. Gordon	61	2005–06
6	Gabe McMillen	60	2006–07
7	Jason Alexander	58	1995–96
8	Corey Walden	56	2010–11
9	E.J. Gordon	55	2002–03
	Sebastian Singletary	55	1998–99

Single game
Rk	Player	Steals	Season	Opponent
1	B.J. Glasford	8	2017–18	Campbell
	Alexis McMillan	8	2 times	

== Blocks ==
Career
Rk	Player	Blocks	Seasons
1	Lorenzo Williams	234	1989–90 1990–91
2	Randy Anderson	168	1985–86 1986–87 1987–88 1988–89
3	Derrall Dumas	134	1988–89 1989–90 1990–91
4	Willie Green	121	2011–12 2012–13 2013–14
5	Mike Reddick	126	1980–81 1981–82 1982–83 1983–84
6	Chad Lambert	107	1994–95 1995–96 1996–97 1997–98
7	Sebastian Singletary	87	1998–99 1999–00 2000–01
8	Tim Lang	81	2006–07 2007–08 2008–09
9	Aubin Gateretse	77	2021–22 2022–23 2023–24
10	Kentwan Smith	72	2013–14 2014–15

Season
Rk	Player	Blocks	Season
1	Lorenzo Williams	121	1989–90
2	Lorenzo Williams	113	1990–91
3	Mike Reddick	72	1981–82
4	Randy Anderson	55	1985–86
5	Mike Reddick	54	1982–83
6	Derrall Dumas	53	1988–89
7	Aubin Gateretse	51	2023–24
8	Kentwan Smith	46	2014–15
9	Derrall Dumas	43	1989–90
	Randy Anderson	43	1986–87

Single game
Rk	Player	Blocks	Season	Opponent
1	Lorenzo Williams	8	3 times	
