= Brian Newton =

American basketball player

Personal information
- Born: January 1966 (age 60)
- Listed height: 6 ft 7 in (2.01 m)

Career information
- High school: Jefferson (Tampa, Florida)
- College: Florida College (1983–1985); Georgia Southern (1985–1987)
- NBA draft: 1987: undrafted
- Position: Forward

Career highlights
- TAAC Player of the Year (1987); First-team All-TAAC (1987); Second-team All-TAAC (1986)

Brian Newton (born January 1966) is an American former basketball player. He played college basketball for the Georgia Southern Eagles and was selected as the Trans America Athletic Conference (TAAC) Player of the Year in 1987.

== High school career ==
Newton did not start playing basketball until the ninth grade. He attended Thomas Jefferson High School in Tampa, Florida, where he played on the basketball team. Newton missed his entire junior season and a third of his senior season due to two knee injuries. One injury was so severe that doctors wondered if he could ever play again. Newton returned to average 10.7 points and 9.7 rebounds per game during his senior season. Major college programs kept away from Newton due to his injury concerns and he instead started his career at Florida College.

== College career ==
Newton's freshman season with the Falcons at Florida College was hampered by injuries; he had arthroscopic surgery on his left knee and sat out half of the season. Newton entered the Falcons' starting line-up during his sophomore season and averaged 10 points and 3 rebounds per game. He was recruited by the Georgia Southern Eagles who realised his potential despite his injury history.

Newton entered the starting line-up of the Eagles seven games into his junior season when he averaged 14 points and 6 rebounds. He led the Eagles to a 20–11 record and the Trans America Athletic Conference (TAAC) tournament title during his senior season. The Eagles qualified for the 1987 NCAA Division I tournament where they lost in the first round to the eventual runner-up Syracuse Orange 79–73. Newton averaged 14.7 points and 5.5 rebounds and was selected as the TAAC Player of the Year.

== Professional career ==
Newton was selected by the Savannah Spirits in the fifth round of the 1987 Continental Basketball Association (CBA) draft.
