= Willie Jackson (basketball) =

American basketball player & coach (born 1962)

Personal information
- Born: June 22, 1962 (age 64) Ringgold, Louisiana, U.S.
- Listed height: 6 ft 6 in (1.98 m)
- Listed weight: 210 lb (95 kg)

Career information
- High school: Sibley (Webster Parish, Louisiana)
- College: Centenary (1980–1984)
- NBA draft: 1984: 4th round, 74th overall pick
- Drafted by: Houston Rockets
- Position: Forward

Career history
- 1984–1985: Wisconsin Flyers
- 1985: Sarasota Stingers

Career highlights
- 3× TAAC Player of the Year (1982–1984); 4× First-team All-TAAC (1981–1984)
- Stats at Basketball Reference

Willie Jackson (born June 22, 1962) is an American former college basketball stand-out and current high school head coach.

== Playing career ==
=== High school ===
Jackson grew up in Webster Parish, Louisiana and attended Sibley High School from 1976–77 to 1979–80. During his junior and senior years, Sibley won 100 straight games, including a perfect 58–0 season in 1979–80 which ended with a state championship.

=== College ===
Willie Jackson decided to stay in Louisiana and signed to play at Centenary College of Louisiana, an NCAA Division I institution. He played basketball all four seasons and graduated as the most prolific scorer in both school and Trans America Athletic Conference (now the ASUN Conference) history. Between 1980–81 and 1983–84, Jackson played in 114 games and recorded 2,535 points, 1,013 rebounds, 112 blocks and 205 steals. Through the 2009–10 season, these rank him first, second, first and third in Centenary history, respectively. Only Hall of Famer Robert Parish grabbed more rebounds (1,820). He scored 30 or more points in a game 21 times and had a career high of 41. When Jackson's career ended, he was one of only seven players in Division I history to have scored 2,500+ points and grabbed 1,000+ rebounds. He remained the only TAAC/ASUN player to be honored as the Conference Player of the Year three times (1982 through 1984) before that feat was matched in 2023 by Liberty's Darius McGhee. At Jackson's graduation, he was only the fourth Division I player ever to earn three conference player of the year awards. His ASUN scoring record lasted until February 22, 2023, when it was surpassed by McGhee, who had the benefit of a fifth season of eligibility due to a blanket NCAA eligibility waiver for all basketball players active in the COVID-disrupted 2020–21 season.

Jackson was drafted in the fourth round (74th overall) in the 1984 NBA draft by the Houston Rockets, although he never played in the league. He played the 1984–85 season in the Continental Basketball Association (CBA), for the Wisconsin Flyers and Sarasota Stingers. He averaged 8.3 points and 3.4 rebounds over 35 games.

== Coaching career ==
Jackson was the head boys' basketball coach Loyola College Prep in Shreveport, Louisiana. His previous coaching experience also included a stint as an assistant coach for Centenary.

Through the 2008–09 boys' basketball season, Jackson has become the winningest coach in school history, leading the Flyers to three playoff berths, a school-record 27 wins in 2007–08, three 20-win seasons (the most of any coach in school history), and his 118 wins was 40 more than the next closest head coach at Loyola Prep. He was also named the Coach of the Year on The (Shreveport) Times All-City team in 2004–05. He was terminated as head coach at the end of the 2012 season.

As of 2012–13 Willie Jackson is the head coach at Central High School in Grand Cane, Louisiana.

== See also ==
- List of NCAA Division I men's basketball players with 2000 points and 1000 rebounds
