= Detric Golden =

American basketball player

Personal information
- Born: January 1, 1977 (age 49) Memphis, Tennessee, U.S.
- Listed height: 5 ft 10 in (1.78 m)
- Listed weight: 154 lb (70 kg)

Career information
- High school: Kingsbury (Memphis, Tennessee)
- College: Northwest Mississippi CC (1995–1997); Memphis (1997–1998); Troy (1999–2000)
- NBA draft: 2000: undrafted
- Playing career: 2000–2001
- Position: Point guard

Career history
- 2000: Gulf Coast SunDogs
- 2001: BCJ Hamburg

Career highlights
- TAAC Player of the Year (2000); First-team All-TAAC (2000); Third-team All-Conference USA (1998); TAAC Newcomer of the Year (2000)

Detric Golden (born January 1, 1977) is an American former professional basketball player. He played college basketball for the Northwest Mississippi CC Rangers, Memphis Tigers and Troy State Trojans. Golden was selected as the Trans America Athletic Conference (TAAC) Player of the Year during his only season with the Trojans in 2000. He played professionally in the United States Basketball League and in Germany. After his playing career, Golden worked as a youth mentor in his hometown of Memphis, Tennessee.

== Early life ==
Golden was raised by his mother in the Hurt Village housing project in Memphis, Tennessee. He played basketball at Kingsbury High School and attracted the attention of college recruiters but did not take enough core classes in high school to meet National Collegiate Athletic Association (NCAA) academic guidelines.

== College career ==
=== Northwest Mississippi CC (1995–1997) ===
Golden debuted for the Rangers at Northwest Mississippi Community College during the 1995–96 season when the team won the state title and set a school record for wins with a 30–6 record. The Rangers won a second consecutive state title the following season with a 28–4 record. Golden scored 52 points in the championship game to lead the Rangers to the title. His 1,223 points in two seasons were a program record.

Golden was inducted into the Northwest Sports Hall of Fame in 2014.

=== Memphis Tigers (1997–1998) ===
On April 14, 1997, Golden signed to play for his hometown Memphis Tigers. He was mentored by graduated Tigers point guard, Chris Garner, to prepare himself for the role. Golden averaged 14.2 points per game and led the Tigers in assists during the 1997–98 season. He was selected to the All-Conference USA third-team.

On May 23, 1998, Tigers head coach Tic Price announced that Golden would not be eligible for the following semester because he did not meet the minimum academic requirements. On September 8, Golden revealed his intention to transfer and cited unhappiness with his role as a secondary scoring threat.

=== Troy State Trojans (1999–2000) ===
Numerous colleges were interested in acquiring Golden but he had soured on the recruiting process after going through it the first time. He said that he would join the first team that contacted him; the Trojans of Troy State University (now Troy University) beat the Georgetown Hoyas by less than a day. The Trojans were the lowest-ranked team in NCAA Division I competition and Golden had never heard of them. Golden sat out the 1998–99 season during which time he married and had a daughter.

Golden led the Trans America Athletic Conference (TAAC) in scoring (17.3) and assists (5.9) during the 1999–2000 season. He was chosen as the TAAC Player of the Year and Newcomer of the Year and named to the All-TAAC first-team.

== Professional career ==
In April 2000, Golden was selected in the United States Basketball League draft by the Gulf Coast SunDogs. He was released by the SunDogs on May 9. Golden played preseason for the Memphis Houn'Dawgs of the American Basketball Association in 2000 but was released before the start of the season. He played three games for BCJ Hamburg in Germany in 2001.

== Post-playing career ==
Golden worked as a youth mentor at Greenlaw Community Center after his playing career. He launched the nonprofit organization Golden Child Ministries in 2004. The Greenlaw Community Center was taken over by Memphis Athletic Ministries in 2009 and Golden was appointed as director for the program.

Golden contended for the Memphis City Council in 2015 as the member for District 2 and finished with 9% of the first vote.

== Personal life ==
Golden married his high school classmate, April, and has four daughters.
