= Mark Jones (basketball, born 1975) =

American basketball player

Personal information
- Born: May 25, 1975 (age 51) Milwaukee, Wisconsin
- Listed height: 6 ft 6 in (1.98 m)
- Listed weight: 215 lb (98 kg)

Career information
- High school: Milwaukee Trade and Technical (Milwaukee, Wisconsin)
- College: Anderson (1993–1995); Minnesota (1995–1996); UCF (1997–1998)
- NBA draft: 1998: undrafted
- Playing career: 1998–2007
- Position: Small forward
- Number: 7

Career history
- 1998–1999: Fort Wayne Fury
- 1999–2000: Morges
- 2000–2001: JL Bourg
- 2001–2002: Élan Chalon
- 2001–2002: Cocodrilos de Caracas
- 2004–2005: Great Lakes Storm
- 2005: Orlando Magic
- 2006–2007: Colorado 14ers

Career highlights
- CBA All-Star (2005); All-CBA Second Team (2005); TAAC Player of the Year (1998); TAAC Newcomer of the Year (1998); First-team All-TAAC (1998)
- Stats at NBA.com
- Stats at Basketball Reference

Mark Jones (born May 25, 1975, in Milwaukee, Wisconsin) is a former professional basketball player who played in the National Basketball Association (NBA). He was undrafted after a career at the University of Central Florida, and at the age of 30 entered the NBA with the Orlando Magic, during the 2004-05 NBA season, averaging 2.3 points per game in ten total games.

In addition to his time in the NBA, Jones played professionally in the Continental Basketball Association (CBA) and NBA Development League in the United States as well as in leagues in Switzerland, France and Venezuela. He was selected to the All-CBA Second Team in 2005.

His nephew, Trey McKinney-Jones, is a professional basketball player.

== Career statistics ==
Legend
GP	Games played	GS	Games started	MPG	Minutes per game
FG%	Field goal percentage	3P%	3-point field goal percentage	FT%	Free throw percentage
RPG	Rebounds per game	APG	Assists per game	SPG	Steals per game
BPG	Blocks per game	PPG	Points per game	**Bold**	Career high

=== NBA ===
==== Regular season ====
Year	Team	GP	GS	MPG	FG%	3P%	FT%	RPG	APG	SPG	BPG	PPG
2004–05	Orlando	10	0	11.6	.290	.000	.500	1.3	.6	.5	.2	2.3
