= Saint George, Virginia =

Unincorporated community in Virginia, United States

Coordinates: 38°16′04″N 78°33′09″W

Saint George is an unincorporated community in Greene County, Virginia, United States. Saint George is home to the Blue Ridge School.
