= Camren Hunter =

American basketball player

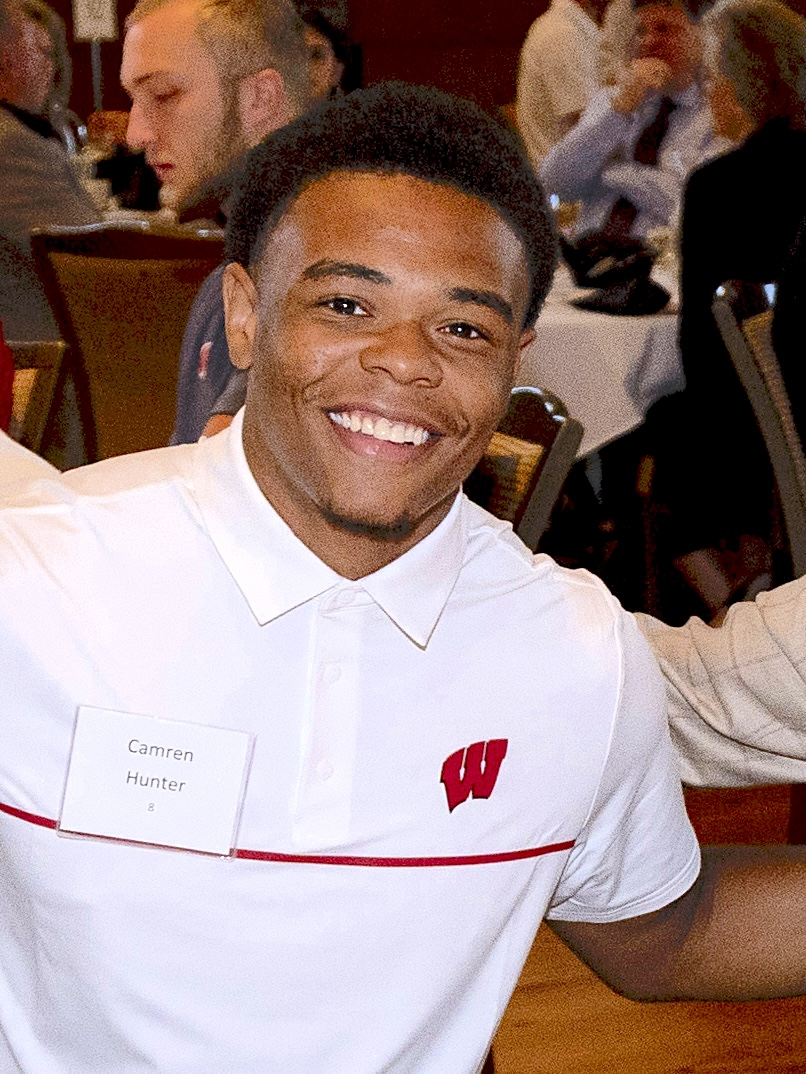
- Hunter in 2024

Lavrio
- Position: Shooting guard
- League: Greek Elite League

Personal information
- Listed height: 6 ft 3 in (1.91 m)
- Listed weight: 205 lb (93 kg)

Career information
- High school: Bryant (Bryant, Arkansas)
- College: Central Arkansas (2021–2023); Wisconsin (2024–2025); Central Arkansas (2025–2026)
- NBA draft: 2026: undrafted
- Playing career: 2026–present

Career history
- 2026–present: Lavrio

Career highlights
- ASUN Player of the Year (2026); 2× First-team All-Atlantic Sun (2022, 2026); Third-team All-Atlantic Sun (2023); Atlantic Sun Freshman of the Year (2022)

Camren Hunter is an American basketball player for Lavrio of the Greek A2 Basket League. He played college basketball for the Wisconsin Badgers and Central Arkansas Bears.

== High school career ==
Hunter attended Bryant High School in Bryant, Arkansas. During his senior season, he averaged 22 points, 7.5 rebounds, four assists and 2.5 steals per game, before committing to play college basketball at the University of Central Arkansas.

== College career ==
As a true freshman, Hunter started 30 games, averaging 14.1 points, 3.4 assists, and 1.5 steals, being named the Atlantic Sun Freshman of the Year. He returned for his sophomore season, averaging 16.9 points, 5.0 rebounds and 3.9 assists, earning third team All-Atlantic Sun honors. Following the season, Hunter announced his intention to transfer to Butler University, but he later announced his intent to return to Central Arkansas for his junior year. Entering his junior season, Hunter suffered a foot injury during the preseason and was forced to redshirt the season. In April 2024, he transferred to the University of Wisconsin–Madison.

Hunter entered the 2024–25 season medically cleared to play. However, he played sparingly in 11 games and entered the transfer portal at the conclusion of the season. On April 7, 2025, Hunter announced his decision to return to Central Arkansas for his redshirt senior season. Upon his return to Central Arkansas, he emerged as the team's leading scorer, being named the Atlantic Sun Player of the Year and leading the Bears to the school's first ever Atlantic Sun regular season championship. In the 2026 ASUN tournament championship game, Hunter scored 49 points in an overtime loss to Queens.

== Professional career ==
On July 7, 2026, Hunter signed his first professional contract with Lavrio of the Greek A2 Basket League.

== Career statistics ==
Legend
| GP | Games played | GS | Games started | MPG | Minutes per game |
| FG% | Field goal percentage | 3P% | 3-point field goal percentage | FT% | Free throw percentage |
| RPG | Rebounds per game | APG | Assists per game | SPG | Steals per game |
| BPG | Blocks per game | PPG | Points per game | **Bold** | Career high |

=== College ===
| Year | Team | GP | GS | MPG | FG% | 3P% | FT% | RPG | APG | SPG | BPG | PPG |
|---|---|---|---|---|---|---|---|---|---|---|---|---|
| 2021–22 | Central Arkansas | 30 | 30 | 32.5 | .447 | .250 | **.815** | 4.9 | 3.4 | **1.5** | 0.5 | 14.1 |
| 2022–23 | Central Arkansas | 30 | 30 | **34.0** | .423 | .311 | .786 | **5.0** | **3.9** | **1.5** | **0.6** | 16.9 |
| 2023–24 | Central Arkansas | Redshirt | | | | | | | | | | |
| 2024–25 | Wisconsin | 11 | 0 | 2.1 | .125 | .250 | .--- | 0.5 | 0.1 | -.- | -.- | 0.3 |
| 2025–26 | Central Arkansas | **34** | **34** | 31.0 | **.506** | **.369** | .796 | 4.2 | 2.7 | 1.4 | 0.2 | **21.0** |
