= 2025–26 Central Arkansas Bears basketball team =

American college basketball season

2025–26 Central Arkansas Bears basketball

ASUN regular season co-champions
- Conference: Atlantic Sun Conference
- Record: 22–12 (15–3 ASUN)
- Head coach: John Shulman (2nd season)
- Associate head coach: Brock Widders
- Assistant coaches: Max Shulman; Ryan Montgomery; Will Braden
- Home arena: Farris Center

2025–26 ASUN men's basketball standings
	Conf.				Overall
Team	W		L	PCT	W		L	PCT
Central Arkansas	15	–	3	.833	22	–	12	.647
Austin Peay	15	–	3	.833	22	–	9	.710
Queens †	13	–	5	.722	21	–	13	.618
Lipscomb	12	–	6	.667	19	–	13	.594
Florida Gulf Coast	8	–	10	.444	16	–	18	.471
West Georgia*	8	–	10	.444	15	–	17	.469
Eastern Kentucky	7	–	11	.389	11	–	21	.344
Bellarmine	7	–	11	.389	13	–	19	.406
Jacksonville	7	–	11	.389	12	–	20	.375
Stetson	7	–	11	.389	12	–	21	.364
North Florida	5	–	13	.278	7	–	25	.219
North Alabama	4	–	14	.222	9	–	21	.300
† 2026 ASUN tournament winner * ineligible for the 2026 NCAA tournament due to transition from Division II; As of March 8, 2026

The 2025–26 Central Arkansas Bears basketball team represented the University of Central Arkansas during the 2025–26 NCAA Division I men's basketball season. The Bears, led by second-year head coach John Shulman, played their home games at the Farris Center in Conway, Arkansas as members of the Atlantic Sun Conference.

== Previous season ==
The Bears finished the 2024–25 season 9–24, 4–14 in ASUN play, to finish in a tie for fourth place. They defeated Stetson, before falling to top-seeded and eventual tournament champions Lipscomb in the quarterfinals of the ASUN tournament.

== Preseason ==
On October 17, 2025, the ASUN released their preseason polls. Central Arkansas was picked to finish eighth in the coaches poll and eleventh in the media poll.

=== Preseason rankings ===
ASUN Preseason Coaches Poll
Place	Team	Votes
1	Queens	136 (6)
2	North Alabama	117
3	Eastern Kentucky	111 (2)
4	Florida Gulf Coast	98 (2)
5	Austin Peay	94 (1)
6	Jacksonville	88
7	Lipscomb	77
8	Central Arkansas	57
9	Stetson	56
10	Bellarmine	36
11	North Florida	34 (1)
12	West Georgia	32
(#) first-place votes

ASUN Preseason Media Poll
Place	Team	Votes
1	North Alabama	519 (18)
2	Eastern Kentucky	495 (3)
3	Queens	468 (9)
4	Florida Gulf Coast	465 (12)
5	Lipscomb	408 (9)
6	Jacksonville	381
7	Austin Peay	357
8	Stetson	243
9	North Florida	192
10	Bellarmine	189
11	Central Arkansas	174
12	West Georgia	126
(#) first-place votes

=== Preseason All-ASUN Team ===
Preseason All-ASUN Team
Player	Year	Position
Camren Hunter	Senior	Guard

== Roster ==
2025–26 Central Arkansas Bears men's basketball team
Players
Coaches

Pos.	#	Name	Height	Weight	Year	Previous school	Hometown
F	0	Truman Byrne	6 ft 9 in (2.06 m)	230 lb (104 kg)	Fr	Berwick College	Melbourne, Australia
G	1	Camren Hunter	6 ft 3 in (1.91 m)	205 lb (93 kg)	Sr	Wisconsin	Bryant, Arkansas
G	2	Javion Guy-King	6 ft 6 in (1.98 m)	220 lb (100 kg)	Jr	Sunrise Christian Academy	Little Rock, Arkansas
G	3	Rylie Marshall	6 ft 3 in (1.91 m)	185 lb (84 kg)	Sr	Harding	Beebe, Arkansas
G	4	J.C. Shulman	6 ft 2 in (1.88 m)	200 lb (91 kg)	Fr	Conway High School	Chattanooga, Tennessee
G/F	5	Tyler Lee	6 ft 5 in (1.96 m)	200 lb (91 kg)	RS Fr	Fulton High School	Knoxville, Tennessee
G	7	R.J. Newton	6 ft 4 in (1.93 m)	185 lb (84 kg)	Fr	Bryant High School	Bryant, Arkansas
G	9	Harry Beauchamp	6 ft 5 in (1.96 m)	200 lb (91 kg)	Fr	Marcellin College	Melbourne, Australia
G	10	Owen Dehrmann	6 ft 4 in (1.93 m)	195 lb (88 kg)	So	Bentonville High School	Bentonville, Arkansas
G	12	Ty Robinson	6 ft 4 in (1.93 m)	190 lb (86 kg)	RS Fr	Lake Hamilton High School	Hot Springs, Arkansas
G	13	Parker Applegate	6 ft 8 in (2.03 m)	220 lb (100 kg)	Jr	Union	Murfreesboro, Tennessee
G	17	Ethan Thomas	6 ft 1 in (1.85 m)	185 lb (84 kg)	So	Wilson Central High School	Lebanon, Tennessee
F	23	Chris Mason	6 ft 7 in (2.01 m)	250 lb (113 kg)	So	Northeastern Oklahoma A&M	Tulsa, Oklahoma
G/F	24	Cole McCormick	6 ft 6 in (1.98 m)	215 lb (98 kg)	So	Notre Dame High School	Chattanooga, Tennessee
F	25	Malchiah Marable	6 ft 9 in (2.06 m)	245 lb (111 kg)	Fr	Hargrave Military Academy	Washington, D.C.
G	32	Luke Moore	6 ft 2 in (1.88 m)	180 lb (82 kg)	Fr	Little Rock Central High School	Little Rock, Arkansas

Head coach

- John Shulman (East Tennessee State)

Assistant coach(es)

- Brock Widders (Lyon)
- Max Shulman (Alabama–Huntsville)
- Ryan Montgomery (Lee)
- Will Braden (Sewanee)

Legend

- (C) Team captain
- (S) Suspended
- (I) Ineligible
- (W) Walk-on
- Injured
- Current redshirt

Roster
Last update: December 3, 2025

== Schedule and results ==
Date time, TV	Rank^{#}	Opponent^{#}	Result	Record	Site (attendance) city, state
Non-conference regular season
November 3, 2025*; 6:00 pm, ACCN		at No. 25 North Carolina	L 54–94	0–1	Dean Smith Center (16,079); Chapel Hill, NC
November 8, 2025*; 1:00 pm, ESPN+		Champion Christian	W 110–63	1–1	Farris Center (936); Conway, AR
November 11, 2025*; 7:00 pm, SECN+		at No. 21 Arkansas	L 56–93	1–2	Bud Walton Arena (19,200); Fayetteville, AR
November 16, 2025*; 1:00 pm, ESPN+		Samford; ASUN/SoCon Challenge	L 77–84 ^{OT}	1–3	Farris Center (819); Conway, AR
November 20, 2025*; 7:00 pm, ESPN+		at North Texas	L 56–74	1–4	The Super Pit (2,743); Denton, TX
November 23, 2025*; 1:00 pm, ESPN+		Eastern Washington	W 92–65	2–4	Farris Center (653); Conway, AR
November 25, 2025*; 6:30 pm, ESPN+		Eastern Illinois	W 81–60	3–4	Farris Center (688); Conway, AR
November 29, 2025*; 3:00 pm, ESPN+		at East Tennessee State; ASUN/SoCon Challenge	L 57–80	3–5	Freedom Hall Civic Center; Johnson City, TN
December 3, 2025*; 6:30 pm, ESPN+		Little Rock; I-40 Showdown	W 85–47	4–5	Farris Center (1,470); Conway, AR
December 7, 2025*; 5:00 pm, ESPN+		at East Texas A&M	L 68–75	4–6	The Field House (413); Commerce, TX
December 13, 2025*; 5:30 pm, SECN		at No. 15 Vanderbilt	L 72–83	4–7	Memorial Gymnasium (7,227); Nashville, TN
December 17, 2025*; 11:00 am, ESPN+		Kansas Christian	W 102–47	5–7	Farris Center (2,342); Conway, AR
December 21, 2025*; 1:00 pm, ACCNX		at SMU	L 82–99	5–8	Moody Coliseum (4,634); University Park, TX
ASUN regular season
January 1, 2026; 1:00 pm, ESPN+		Florida Gulf Coast	W 85–83	6–8 (1–0)	Farris Center (796); Conway, AR
January 3, 2026; 1:00 pm, ESPN+		Stetson	W 93–73	7–8 (2–0)	Farris Center (782); Conway, AR
January 8, 2026; 6:00 pm, ESPN+		at Bellarmine	L 78–84 ^{OT}	7–9 (2–1)	Knights Hall (1,752); Louisville, KY
January 10, 2026; 3:00 pm, ESPN+		at Eastern Kentucky	L 74–79 ^{OT}	7–10 (2–2)	Baptist Health Arena (1,171); Richmond, KY
January 15, 2026; 6:30 pm, ESPN+		Jacksonville	W 62–60	8–10 (3–2)	Farris Center (922); Conway, AR
January 17, 2026; 1:00 pm, ESPN+		North Florida	W 98–69	9–10 (4–2)	Farris Center (802); Conway, AR
January 22, 2026; 1:00 pm, ESPN+		at West Georgia	W 86–65	10–10 (5–2)	The Coliseum (1,274); Carrollton, GA
January 28, 2026; 6:00 pm, ESPN+		at Queens	W 100–90	11–10 (6–2)	Curry Arena (420); Charlotte, NC
January 31, 2026; 3:30 pm, ESPN+		Eastern Kentucky	W 90–81	12–10 (7–2)	Farris Center (1,128); Conway, AR
February 4, 2026; 6:30 pm, ESPN+		North Alabama	W 81–60	13–10 (8–2)	Farris Center (984); Conway, AR
February 7, 2026; 4:00 pm, ESPN+		at Lipscomb	W 86–78	14–10 (9–2)	Allen Arena (1,147); Nashville, TN
February 9, 2026; 6:00 pm, ESPN+		at North Alabama	W 72–65	15–10 (10–2)	CB&S Bank Arena (2,202); Florence, AL
February 11, 2026; 6:30 pm, ESPN+		Bellarmine	W 84–76	16–10 (11–2)	Farris Center (1,165); Conway, AR
February 14, 2026; 1:00 pm, ESPN+		West Georgia	W 79–62	17–10 (12–2)	Farris Center (1,583); Conway, AR
February 19, 2026; 7:00 pm, ESPN+		at Stetson	W 88–76	18–10 (13–2)	Insight Credit Union Arena (752); DeLand, FL
February 21, 2026; 1:00 pm, ESPN+		at Florida Gulf Coast	L 71–75 ^{OT}	18–11 (13–3)	Alico Arena; Fort Myers, FL
February 25, 2026; 7:30 pm, ESPN+		at Austin Peay	W 93–88	19–11 (14–3)	F&M Bank Arena; Clarksville, TN
February 28, 2026; 1:00 pm, ESPN+		Queens	W 84–79	20–11 (15–3)	Farris Center (1,472); Conway, AR
ASUN tournament
March 6, 2026; 11:00 am, ESPN+	(1)	vs. (8) Bellarmine; Quarterfinals	W 86–73	21–11	VyStar Veterans Memorial Arena; Jacksonville, FL
March 7, 2026; 4:00 pm, ESPN+	(1)	vs. (5) Florida Gulf Coast; Semifinals	W 73–63	22–11	VyStar Veterans Memorial Arena; Jacksonville, FL
March 8, 2026; 1:00 pm, ESPN2	(1)	vs. (3) Queens; Championship	L 93–98 ^{OT}	22–12	VyStar Veterans Memorial Arena (2,066); Jacksonville, FL
*Non-conference game. ^{#}Rankings from AP Poll. (#) Tournament seedings in parentheses. All times are in Central.
