= Kerry Blackshear Sr. =

American basketball player (born 1973)

Personal information
- Born: November 12, 1973 (age 53) Orlando, Florida, U.S.
- Listed height: 6 ft 6 in (1.98 m)
- Listed weight: 218 lb (99 kg)

Career information
- High school: Fort Pierce Central (Fort Pierce, Florida)
- College: Stetson (1992–1996)
- NBA draft: 1996: undrafted
- Playing career: 1997–2009
- Position: Small forward

Career history
- 1997–1998: TK Hannover
- 1998–2000: C.D. Universidad de Concepción
- 2000–2001: Panteras de Miranda
- 2000: Gaiteros del Zulia
- 2000: Plaza Santiago
- 2000–2001: Estudiantes de Bahía Blanca
- 2001: Gaiteros del Zulia
- 2001–2002: CB Ciudad de Huelva
- 2002: Gaiteros del Zulia
- 2002: Naco
- 2003: San Lazaro
- 2003: Gaiteros del Zulia
- 2003–2004: CB Aracena-Ponts
- 2004: Gaiteros del Zulia
- 2004–2005: Cáceres CB
- 2005: Gaiteros del Zulia
- 2005–2006: CEB Llíria
- 2006–2007: Palencia Baloncesto
- 2007: Gandía BA
- 2007–2008: CB Tarragona
- 2008–2009: CB Plasencia Ambroz
- 2009: C.D. Universidad de Concepción

Career highlights
- TAAC Player of the Year (1995); First-team All-TAAC (1995); Second-team All-TAAC (1994)

Kerry Devon Blackshear Sr. (born November 12, 1973) is an American retired professional basketball player. He played college basketball at Stetson.

Blackshear was the oldest of nine siblings. He attended Fort Pierce Central High School. Blackshear did not play competitive basketball until 1990, picking up the game after his mother died. He was discovered by Stetson assistant coach Frank Burnell, who saw him play a junior varsity game. At the time, Blackshear was considering enlisting in the army, but instead went to Stetson, choosing the Hatters over offers from McNeese State, Queens College, and Chipola Junior College.

Blackshear was named Trans America Athletic Conference Newcomer of the Year after his freshman season at Stetson. He averaged 17 points and 5.6 rebounds per game as a sophomore. Blackshear's season ended in February 1994, when he broke a metatarsal bone in his foot. As a junior, he averaged 20.4 points and 6.8 rebounds per game. Blackshear was named to the First Team All-TAAC and TAAC Player of the Year. He averaged 16 points per game as a senior, though the team finished 10–17. Blackshear finished his career with 1,826 points, second all-time in Stetson history, as well as 643 rebounds (14th in program history), 170 three-pointers (fourth) and 152 steals (fifth).

After graduation, Blackshear was drafted by the Treasure Coast Tropics of the United States Basketball League. He played professionally in several countries in Europe and South America. He married Lamilia Ford, whom he met while they both played basketball at Stetson. Their son Kerry Jr. is also a professional basketball player. As of 2015, the elder Blackshear works as a manager in the Orlando parks and recreation department. He was inducted into Stetson's Hall of Fame in 2002.
